= 2013 ITF Women's Circuit (April–June) =

Women's tennis tournament series

The 2013 ITF Women's Circuit is the 2013 edition of the second tier tour for women's professional tennis. It is organised by the International Tennis Federation and is a tier below the WTA Tour. The ITF Women's Circuit includes tournaments with prize money ranging from $10,000 up to $100,000.

== Key ==
$100,000 tournaments
$75,000 tournaments
$50,000 tournaments
$25,000 tournaments
$15,000 tournaments
$10,000 tournaments
All titles

== Month ==
=== April ===
Week of	Tournament	Winner	Runners-up	Semifinalists	Quarterfinalists
April 1, 2013	Jackson, United States; Clay $25,000; Singles and doubles draws	(Germany) Laura Siegemund; 6–4, 6–0	(Argentina) Florencia Molinero	(United States) Allie Kiick (Slovenia) Maša Zec Peškirič	(Spain) Arantxa Parra Santonja (Switzerland) Lara Michel (Switzerland) Conny Perrin (Sweden) Sandra Roma
April 1, 2013	Jackson, United States; Clay $25,000; Singles and doubles draws	(Belarus) Ilona Kremen (Netherlands) Angelique van der Meet; 6–3, 6–4	(Bolivia) María Fernanda Álvarez Terán (Paraguay) Verónica Cepede Royg	(United States) Allie Kiick (Slovenia) Maša Zec Peškirič	(Spain) Arantxa Parra Santonja (Switzerland) Lara Michel (Switzerland) Conny Perrin (Sweden) Sandra Roma
April 1, 2013	Dijon, France; Hard (indoor) $15,000; Singles and doubles draws	(Germany) Kristina Barrois; 6–3, 7–5	(Bulgaria) Elitsa Kostova	(France) Julie Coin (Belgium) An-Sophie Mestach	(United Kingdom) Emily Webley-Smith (United States) Caitlin Whoriskey (Italy) Alberta Brianti (Switzerland) Amra Sadiković
April 1, 2013	Dijon, France; Hard (indoor) $15,000; Singles and doubles draws	(Italy) Nicole Clerico (Italy) Giulia Gatto-Monticone; 6–4, 6–2	(Bulgaria) Elitsa Kostova (Russia) Marina Shamayko	(France) Julie Coin (Belgium) An-Sophie Mestach	(United Kingdom) Emily Webley-Smith (United States) Caitlin Whoriskey (Italy) Alberta Brianti (Switzerland) Amra Sadiković
April 1, 2013	Sharm el-Sheikh, Egypt; Hard $10,000; Singles and doubles draws	(Serbia) Doroteja Erić; 7–6^{(7–4)}, 3–6, 6–3	(Czech Republic) Martina Kubičíková	(Russia) Anastasiya Saitova (Chinese Taipei) Juan Ting-fei	(Sweden) Rebecca Peterson (Belgium) Justine De Sutter (Poland) Sylwia Zagórska (Russia) Ekaterina Yashina
April 1, 2013	Sharm el-Sheikh, Egypt; Hard $10,000; Singles and doubles draws	(Belgium) Justine De Sutter (Belgium) Elise Mertens; 6–1, 6–4	(Russia) Alina Mikheeva (Canada) Jillian O'Neill	(Russia) Anastasiya Saitova (Chinese Taipei) Juan Ting-fei	(Sweden) Rebecca Peterson (Belgium) Justine De Sutter (Poland) Sylwia Zagórska (Russia) Ekaterina Yashina
April 1, 2013	Heraklion, Greece; Carpet $10,000; Singles and doubles draws	(Serbia) Teodora Mirčić; 6–0, 6–1	(Bulgaria) Aleksandra Karamanoleva	(Italy) Sara Sussarello (Portugal) Joana Valle Costa	(Italy) Stephanie Scimone (Bulgaria) Julia Stamatova (Sweden) Matilda Hamlin (Greece) Despina Papamichail
April 1, 2013	Heraklion, Greece; Carpet $10,000; Singles and doubles draws	(Slovakia) Vivien Juhászová (Serbia) Teodora Mirčić; 7–5, 6–7^{(7–9)}, [10–4]	(Italy) Giulia Sussarello (Italy) Sara Sussarello	(Italy) Sara Sussarello (Portugal) Joana Valle Costa	(Italy) Stephanie Scimone (Bulgaria) Julia Stamatova (Sweden) Matilda Hamlin (Greece) Despina Papamichail
April 1, 2013	Torrent, Spain; Clay $10,000; Singles and doubles draws	(Germany) Dinah Pfizenmaier; 6–3, 6–1	(Germany) Justine Ozga	(Brazil) Eduarda Piai (Venezuela) Andrea Gámiz	(Ukraine) Kateryna Sliusar (Egypt) Mayar Sherif (Spain) Olga Sáez Larra (Ukraine) Sofiya Kovalets
April 1, 2013	Torrent, Spain; Clay $10,000; Singles and doubles draws	(Argentina) Tatiana Búa (Venezuela) Andrea Gámiz; 6–1, 6–0	(Brazil) Yasmine Guimarães (Portugal) Rita Vilaça	(Brazil) Eduarda Piai (Venezuela) Andrea Gámiz	(Ukraine) Kateryna Sliusar (Egypt) Mayar Sherif (Spain) Olga Sáez Larra (Ukraine) Sofiya Kovalets
April 1, 2013	Antalya, Turkey; Hard $10,000; Singles and doubles draws	(Switzerland) Viktorija Golubic; 6–4, 6–2	(Sweden) Ellen Allgurin	(Czech Republic) Petra Krejsová (Turkey) Melis Sezer	(Czech Republic) Tereza Martincová (Georgia (country)) Oksana Kalashnikova (Slovakia) Chantal Škamlová (Turkey) Başak Eraydın
April 1, 2013	Antalya, Turkey; Hard $10,000; Singles and doubles draws	(Switzerland) Viktorija Golubic (Philippines) Katharina Lehnert; 5–7, 6–3, [10–7]	(Czech Republic) Martina Borecká (Czech Republic) Petra Krejsová	(Czech Republic) Petra Krejsová (Turkey) Melis Sezer	(Czech Republic) Tereza Martincová (Georgia (country)) Oksana Kalashnikova (Slovakia) Chantal Škamlová (Turkey) Başak Eraydın
April 8, 2013	Poza Rica, Mexico; Hard $25,000; Singles and doubles draws	(Serbia) Jovana Jakšić; 2–6, 6–3, 6–4	(United States) Julia Cohen	(Argentina) María Irigoyen (Mexico) Marcela Zacarías	(Russia) Alla Kudryavtseva (Ukraine) Alyona Sotnikova (Argentina) Mailen Auroux (Canada) Stéphanie Dubois
April 8, 2013	Poza Rica, Mexico; Hard $25,000; Singles and doubles draws	(Bolivia) María Fernanda Álvarez Terán (Brazil) Maria Fernanda Alves; 6–2, 6–3	(Canada) Stéphanie Dubois (Ukraine) Olga Savchuk	(Argentina) María Irigoyen (Mexico) Marcela Zacarías	(Russia) Alla Kudryavtseva (Ukraine) Alyona Sotnikova (Argentina) Mailen Auroux (Canada) Stéphanie Dubois
April 8, 2013	La Marsa, Tunisia; Clay $25,000; Singles and doubles draws	(Austria) Yvonne Meusburger; 6–3, 6–4	(Russia) Victoria Kan	(Russia) Yana Buchina (Hungary) Réka-Luca Jani	(Italy) Gioia Barbieri (Slovenia) Nastja Kolar (Spain) Sara Sorribes Tormo (Bosnia and Herzegovina) Jasmina Tinjić
April 8, 2013	La Marsa, Tunisia; Clay $25,000; Singles and doubles draws	(Hungary) Réka-Luca Jani (Russia) Eugeniya Pashkova; 6–3, 4–6, [10–5]	(Montenegro) Danka Kovinić (Brazil) Laura Pigossi	(Russia) Yana Buchina (Hungary) Réka-Luca Jani	(Italy) Gioia Barbieri (Slovenia) Nastja Kolar (Spain) Sara Sorribes Tormo (Bosnia and Herzegovina) Jasmina Tinjić
April 8, 2013	Edgbaston, United Kingdom; Hard (indoor) $25,000; Singles and doubles draws	(Russia) Ekaterina Bychkova; 6–4, 6–3	(Italy) Angelica Moratelli	(France) Julie Coin (United Kingdom) Tara Moore	(Turkey) Çağla Büyükakçay (France) Amandine Hesse (Italy) Giulia Gatto-Monticone (United Kingdom) Samantha Murray
April 8, 2013	Edgbaston, United Kingdom; Hard (indoor) $25,000; Singles and doubles draws	(Germany) Kristina Barrois (Croatia) Ana Vrljić; 6–4, 7–6^{(7–2)}	(Netherlands) Richèl Hogenkamp (Liechtenstein) Stephanie Vogt	(France) Julie Coin (United Kingdom) Tara Moore	(Turkey) Çağla Büyükakçay (France) Amandine Hesse (Italy) Giulia Gatto-Monticone (United Kingdom) Samantha Murray
April 8, 2013	Pelham, United States; Clay $25,000; Singles and doubles draws	(Colombia) Mariana Duque Mariño; 1–6, 6–3, 6–4	(Japan) Kurumi Nara	(United States) Jessica Pegula (Australia) Ashleigh Barty	(South Africa) Chanelle Scheepers (France) Claire Feuerstein (Canada) Sharon Fichman (Puerto Rico) Monica Puig
April 8, 2013	Pelham, United States; Clay $25,000; Singles and doubles draws	(Australia) Ashleigh Barty (Russia) Arina Rodionova; 6–4, 6–2	(Chinese Taipei) Kao Shao-yuan (Chinese Taipei) Lee Hua-chen	(United States) Jessica Pegula (Australia) Ashleigh Barty	(South Africa) Chanelle Scheepers (France) Claire Feuerstein (Canada) Sharon Fichman (Puerto Rico) Monica Puig
April 8, 2013	Bol, Croatia; Clay $10,000; Singles and doubles draws	(Hungary) Ágnes Bukta; 5–7, 6–2, 7–5	(United States) Bernarda Pera	(Ukraine) Sofiya Kovalets (Czech Republic) Barbora Krejčíková	(Slovakia) Zuzana Zlochová (Slovakia) Chantal Škamlová (Slovakia) Karin Morgošová (France) Estelle Guisard
April 8, 2013	Bol, Croatia; Clay $10,000; Singles and doubles draws	(Czech Republic) Barbora Krejčíková (Russia) Polina Leykina; 6–3, 6–3	(Croatia) Jana Fett (United States) Bernarda Pera	(Ukraine) Sofiya Kovalets (Czech Republic) Barbora Krejčíková	(Slovakia) Zuzana Zlochová (Slovakia) Chantal Škamlová (Slovakia) Karin Morgošová (France) Estelle Guisard
April 8, 2013	Sharm el-Sheikh, Egypt; Hard $10,000; Singles and doubles draws	(Spain) Arabela Fernández Rabener; 6–4, 6–3	(Poland) Natalia Kołat	(Belgium) Elise Mertens (Poland) Olga Brózda	(Russia) Yuliya Kalabina (Sweden) Rebecca Peterson (Austria) Janina Toljan (France) Alix Collombon
April 8, 2013	Sharm el-Sheikh, Egypt; Hard $10,000; Singles and doubles draws	(Chinese Taipei) Juan Ting-fei (Russia) Yuliya Kalabina; 6–3, 6–4	(Czech Republic) Nikola Fraňková (Germany) Michaela Frlicka	(Belgium) Elise Mertens (Poland) Olga Brózda	(Russia) Yuliya Kalabina (Sweden) Rebecca Peterson (Austria) Janina Toljan (France) Alix Collombon
April 8, 2013	Heraklion, Greece; Carpet $10,000; Singles and doubles draws	(Switzerland) Karin Kennel; 6–1, 3–6, 6–3	(Italy) Anna Floris	(Serbia) Tamara Čurović (Greece) Valentini Grammatikopoulou	(Italy) Giulia Sussarello (Bulgaria) Julia Stamatova (Portugal) Joana Valle Costa (Slovakia) Vivien Juhászová
April 8, 2013	Heraklion, Greece; Carpet $10,000; Singles and doubles draws	(Russia) Marina Melnikova (Serbia) Teodora Mirčić; 6–1, 6–4	(Greece) Despina Papamichail (Italy) Giulia Sussarello	(Serbia) Tamara Čurović (Greece) Valentini Grammatikopoulou	(Italy) Giulia Sussarello (Bulgaria) Julia Stamatova (Portugal) Joana Valle Costa (Slovakia) Vivien Juhászová
April 8, 2013	Antalya, Turkey; Hard $10,000; Singles and doubles draws	(Switzerland) Viktorija Golubic; 6–2, 6–3	(Philippines) Katharina Lehnert	(Portugal) Bárbara Luz (Bosnia and Herzegovina) Anita Husarić	(Argentina) Francesca Rescaldani (Brazil) Beatriz Haddad Maia (Russia) Tamara Bizhukova (Czech Republic) Kristýna Hrabalová
April 8, 2013	Antalya, Turkey; Hard $10,000; Singles and doubles draws	(Romania) Irina Maria Bara (Romania) Diana Buzean; 7–5, 6–1	(Brazil) Beatriz Haddad Maia (Portugal) Bárbara Luz	(Portugal) Bárbara Luz (Bosnia and Herzegovina) Anita Husarić	(Argentina) Francesca Rescaldani (Brazil) Beatriz Haddad Maia (Russia) Tamara Bizhukova (Czech Republic) Kristýna Hrabalová
April 15, 2013	Dothan Pro Tennis Classic; Dothan, United States; Clay $50,000; Singles – Doubles	(Croatia) Ajla Tomljanović; 2–6, 6–4, 6–3	(China) Zhang Shuai	(United States) Alison Riske (United States) Irina Falconi	(United States) Shelby Rogers (United States) Alexa Glatch (United States) Jessica Pegula (Germany) Tatjana Maria
April 15, 2013	Dothan Pro Tennis Classic; Dothan, United States; Clay $50,000; Singles – Doubles	(United States) Julia Cohen (Germany) Tatjana Maria; 6–4, 4–6, [11–9]	(United States) Irina Falconi (United States) Maria Sanchez	(United States) Alison Riske (United States) Irina Falconi	(United States) Shelby Rogers (United States) Alexa Glatch (United States) Jessica Pegula (Germany) Tatjana Maria
April 15, 2013	Namangan, Uzbekistan; Hard $25,000; Singles and doubles draws	(Ukraine) Nadiia Kichenok; 6–2, 6–3	(Georgia (country)) Oksana Kalashnikova	(Russia) Alexandra Panova (Turkey) Çağla Büyükakçay	(Ukraine) Valentyna Ivakhnenko (Georgia (country)) Sofia Shapatava (Russia) Ekaterina Bychkova (Russia) Ekaterina Yashina
April 15, 2013	Namangan, Uzbekistan; Hard $25,000; Singles and doubles draws	(Uzbekistan) Albina Khabibulina (Ukraine) Anastasiya Vasylyeva; 6–3, 6–3	(Ukraine) Valentyna Ivakhnenko (Kyrgyzstan) Ksenia Palkina	(Russia) Alexandra Panova (Turkey) Çağla Büyükakçay	(Ukraine) Valentyna Ivakhnenko (Georgia (country)) Sofia Shapatava (Russia) Ekaterina Bychkova (Russia) Ekaterina Yashina
April 15, 2013	Šibenik, Croatia; Clay $10,000; Singles and doubles draws	(Hungary) Ágnes Bukta; 6–3, 6–2	(Czech Republic) Barbora Krejčíková	(United States) Bernarda Pera (Ukraine) Sofiya Kovalets	(Romania) Bianca Hîncu (Germany) Sina Haas (Slovenia) Tjaša Šrimpf (Slovenia) Polona Reberšak
April 15, 2013	Šibenik, Croatia; Clay $10,000; Singles and doubles draws	(Czech Republic) Barbora Krejčíková (Russia) Polina Leykina; 3–6, 6–3, [12–10]	(Netherlands) Cindy Burger (Germany) Anna Klasen	(United States) Bernarda Pera (Ukraine) Sofiya Kovalets	(Romania) Bianca Hîncu (Germany) Sina Haas (Slovenia) Tjaša Šrimpf (Slovenia) Polona Reberšak
April 15, 2013	Sharm el-Sheikh, Egypt; Hard $10,000; Singles and doubles draws	(Belgium) Elise Mertens; 6–4, 6–3	(Spain) Arabela Fernández Rabener	(Poland) Olga Brózda (Romania) Elena-Teodora Cadar	(Bulgaria) Elitsa Kostova (Slovenia) Anja Prislan (Belgium) Justine De Sutter (Russia) Olga Doroshina
April 15, 2013	Sharm el-Sheikh, Egypt; Hard $10,000; Singles and doubles draws	(Poland) Olga Brózda (Poland) Natalia Kołat; 6–3, 6–1	(Russia) Olga Doroshina (Brazil) Laura Pigossi	(Poland) Olga Brózda (Romania) Elena-Teodora Cadar	(Bulgaria) Elitsa Kostova (Slovenia) Anja Prislan (Belgium) Justine De Sutter (Russia) Olga Doroshina
April 15, 2013	Heraklion, Greece; Carpet $10,000; Singles and doubles draws	(Netherlands) Michaëlla Krajicek; 3–6, 6–2, 6–4	(Netherlands) Indy de Vroome	(Spain) Nuria Párrizas Díaz (Liechtenstein) Kathinka von Deichmann	(Italy) Anna Floris (Slovakia) Nikola Vajdová (Republic of Ireland) Amy Bowtell (Russia) Marina Melnikova
April 15, 2013	Heraklion, Greece; Carpet $10,000; Singles and doubles draws	(Netherlands) Michaëlla Krajicek (Netherlands) Indy de Vroome; 6–0, 5–7, [10–8]	(Netherlands) Rosalie van der Hoek (Japan) Yuka Mori	(Spain) Nuria Párrizas Díaz (Liechtenstein) Kathinka von Deichmann	(Italy) Anna Floris (Slovakia) Nikola Vajdová (Republic of Ireland) Amy Bowtell (Russia) Marina Melnikova
April 15, 2013	Chennai, India; Clay $10,000; Singles and doubles draws	(India) Ankita Raina; 6–3, 6–1	(India) Natasha Palha	(Serbia) Barbara Bonić (Australia) Angelique Svinos	(India) Eetee Maheta (India) Prarthana Thombare (India) Mahitha Dadi Reddy (China) Wang Xiyao
April 15, 2013	Chennai, India; Clay $10,000; Singles and doubles draws	(India) Natasha Palha (India) Prarthana Thombare; 5–7, 6–3, [10–6]	(India) Rushmi Chakravarthi (India) Ankita Raina	(Serbia) Barbara Bonić (Australia) Angelique Svinos	(India) Eetee Maheta (India) Prarthana Thombare (India) Mahitha Dadi Reddy (China) Wang Xiyao
April 15, 2013	Antalya, Turkey; Hard $10,000; Singles and doubles draws	(Brazil) Beatriz Haddad Maia; 6–4, 6–3	(Czech Republic) Tereza Martincová	(Ukraine) Ganna Poznikhirenko (Germany) Korina Perkovic	(Russia) Mayya Katsitadze (Japan) Mai Minokoshi (Sweden) Susanne Celik (Turkey) Pemra Özgen
April 15, 2013	Antalya, Turkey; Hard $10,000; Singles and doubles draws	(Argentina) Andrea Benítez (Brazil) Carla Forte; 6–2, 6–4	(Romania) Irina Maria Bara (Romania) Diana Buzean	(Ukraine) Ganna Poznikhirenko (Germany) Korina Perkovic	(Russia) Mayya Katsitadze (Japan) Mai Minokoshi (Sweden) Susanne Celik (Turkey) Pemra Özgen
April 22, 2013	ITF Women's Circuit – Wenshan; Wenshan, China; Hard $50,000; Singles – Doubles	(China) Zhang Yuxuan; 1–6, 7–6^{(7–4)}, 6–2	(China) Wang Qiang	(China) Duan Yingying (China) Zheng Saisai	(China) Zhang Kailin (China) Sun Shengnan (Kazakhstan) Zarina Diyas (Thailand) Varatchaya Wongteanchai
April 22, 2013	ITF Women's Circuit – Wenshan; Wenshan, China; Hard $50,000; Singles – Doubles	(Japan) Miki Miyamura (Thailand) Varatchaya Wongteanchai; 7–5, 6–3	(Japan) Rika Fujiwara (Japan) Junri Namigata	(China) Duan Yingying (China) Zheng Saisai	(China) Zhang Kailin (China) Sun Shengnan (Kazakhstan) Zarina Diyas (Thailand) Varatchaya Wongteanchai
April 22, 2013	Lale Cup; Istanbul, Turkey; Hard $50,000; Singles – Doubles	(Croatia) Donna Vekić; 6–4, 7–6^{(7–4)}	(Russia) Elizaveta Kulichkova	(Russia) Vera Dushevina (Croatia) Ana Vrljić	(Slovakia) Kristína Kučová (Ukraine) Yuliya Beygelzimer (Thailand) Noppawan Lertcheewakarn (Czech Republic) Kristýna Plíšková
April 22, 2013	Lale Cup; Istanbul, Turkey; Hard $50,000; Singles – Doubles	(Russia) Ekaterina Bychkova (Ukraine) Nadiia Kichenok; 3–6, 6–2, [10–5]	(Turkey) Başak Eraydın (Bulgaria) Aleksandrina Naydenova	(Russia) Vera Dushevina (Croatia) Ana Vrljić	(Slovakia) Kristína Kučová (Ukraine) Yuliya Beygelzimer (Thailand) Noppawan Lertcheewakarn (Czech Republic) Kristýna Plíšková
April 22, 2013	Boyd Tinsley Women's Clay Court Classic; Charlottesville, United States; Clay $50,000; Singles – Doubles	(United States) Shelby Rogers; 6–3, 7–5	(United States) Allie Kiick	(United States) Madison Brengle (Austria) Patricia Mayr-Achleitner	(Belarus) Ilona Kremen (United States) Julia Cohen (United States) Allie Will (United States) Nicole Gibbs
April 22, 2013	Boyd Tinsley Women's Clay Court Classic; Charlottesville, United States; Clay $50,000; Singles – Doubles	(United Kingdom) Nicola Slater (United States) Coco Vandeweghe; 6–3, 7–6^{(7–4)}	(United States) Nicole Gibbs (United States) Shelby Rogers	(United States) Madison Brengle (Austria) Patricia Mayr-Achleitner	(Belarus) Ilona Kremen (United States) Julia Cohen (United States) Allie Will (United States) Nicole Gibbs
April 22, 2013	Chiasso, Switzerland; Clay $25,000; Singles and doubles draws	(Belgium) Alison Van Uytvanck; 7–6^{(7–2)}, 6–3	(Poland) Katarzyna Kawa	(Czech Republic) Lucie Hradecká (Italy) Giulia Gatto-Monticone	(Romania) Alexandra Dulgheru (Italy) Anna Remondina (Switzerland) Karin Kennel (Switzerland) Viktorija Golubic
April 22, 2013	Chiasso, Switzerland; Clay $25,000; Singles and doubles draws	(Latvia) Diāna Marcinkēviča (Belarus) Aliaksandra Sasnovich; 6–7^{(2–7)}, 6–4, [10–7]	(Italy) Nicole Clerico (Italy) Giulia Gatto-Monticone	(Czech Republic) Lucie Hradecká (Italy) Giulia Gatto-Monticone	(Romania) Alexandra Dulgheru (Italy) Anna Remondina (Switzerland) Karin Kennel (Switzerland) Viktorija Golubic
April 22, 2013	Phuket, Thailand; Hard (indoor) $25,000; Singles and doubles draws	(Thailand) Luksika Kumkhum; 6–0, 7–5	(United Kingdom) Lisa Whybourn	(Austria) Melanie Klaffner (Thailand) Peangtarn Plipuech	(Slovakia) Zuzana Zlochová (Australia) Alison Bai (United Kingdom) Naomi Broady (Thailand) Kamonwan Buayam
April 22, 2013	Phuket, Thailand; Hard (indoor) $25,000; Singles and doubles draws	(Thailand) Nicha Lertpitaksinchai (Thailand) Peangtarn Plipuech; 6–3, 5–7, [11–9]	(United Kingdom) Tara Moore (United Kingdom) Melanie South	(Austria) Melanie Klaffner (Thailand) Peangtarn Plipuech	(Slovakia) Zuzana Zlochová (Australia) Alison Bai (United Kingdom) Naomi Broady (Thailand) Kamonwan Buayam
April 22, 2013	Tunis, Tunisia; Clay $25,000; Singles and doubles draws	(Tunisia) Ons Jabeur; 6–3, 6–2	(Spain) Sara Sorribes Tormo	(Chile) Daniela Seguel (Russia) Victoria Kan	(Venezuela) Andrea Gámiz (Russia) Yana Buchina (Italy) Angelica Moratelli (Romania) Mădălina Gojnea
April 22, 2013	Tunis, Tunisia; Clay $25,000; Singles and doubles draws	(Serbia) Aleksandra Krunić (Poland) Katarzyna Piter; 6–2, 3–6, [10–7]	(Hungary) Réka-Luca Jani (Russia) Eugeniya Pashkova	(Chile) Daniela Seguel (Russia) Victoria Kan	(Venezuela) Andrea Gámiz (Russia) Yana Buchina (Italy) Angelica Moratelli (Romania) Mădălina Gojnea
April 22, 2013	São Paulo, Brazil; Clay $10,000; Singles and doubles draws	(Brazil) Roxane Vaisemberg; 6–4, 6–2	(Paraguay) Montserrat González	(Brazil) Nathalia Rossi (Brazil) Luisa Stefani	(Mexico) Ana Sofía Sánchez (Brazil) Nathaly Kurata (Hungary) Csilla Borsányi (Argentina) Nadia Podoroska
April 22, 2013	São Paulo, Brazil; Clay $10,000; Singles and doubles draws	(Brazil) Raquel Piltcher (Brazil) Nathalia Rossi; 6–3, 6–0	(Argentina) Melina Ferrero (Chile) Ivania Martinich	(Brazil) Nathalia Rossi (Brazil) Luisa Stefani	(Mexico) Ana Sofía Sánchez (Brazil) Nathaly Kurata (Hungary) Csilla Borsányi (Argentina) Nadia Podoroska
April 22, 2013	Sharm el-Sheikh, Egypt; Hard $10,000; Singles and doubles draws	(Spain) Arabela Fernández Rabener; 3–6, 6–4, 7–6^{(7–3)}	(Russia) Yana Sizikova	(Austria) Barbara Haas (France) Morgane Pons	(Brazil) Laura Pigossi (Poland) Agata Barańska (Germany) Amelie Intert (Russia) Anna Morgina
April 22, 2013	Sharm el-Sheikh, Egypt; Hard $10,000; Singles and doubles draws	(Romania) Elena-Teodora Cadar (Spain) Arabela Fernández Rabener; 6–4, 6–3	(Russia) Olga Doroshina (Brazil) Laura Pigossi	(Austria) Barbara Haas (France) Morgane Pons	(Brazil) Laura Pigossi (Poland) Agata Barańska (Germany) Amelie Intert (Russia) Anna Morgina
April 22, 2013	Heraklion, Greece; Carpet $10,000; Singles and doubles draws	(Greece) Valentini Grammatikopoulou; 6–3, 6–4	(Republic of Ireland) Amy Bowtell	(Serbia) Tamara Čurović (Bulgaria) Julia Stamatova	(Spain) Nuria Párrizas Díaz (Russia) Aminat Kushkhova (Slovakia) Nikola Vajdová (Greece) Maria Sakkari
April 22, 2013	Heraklion, Greece; Carpet $10,000; Singles and doubles draws	(Serbia) Tamara Čurović (Italy) Camilla Rosatello; 7–6^{(7–4)}, 6–3	(Spain) Olga Parres Azcoitia (Spain) Nuria Párrizas Díaz	(Serbia) Tamara Čurović (Bulgaria) Julia Stamatova	(Spain) Nuria Párrizas Díaz (Russia) Aminat Kushkhova (Slovakia) Nikola Vajdová (Greece) Maria Sakkari
April 22, 2013	Lucknow, India; Grass $10,000; Singles and doubles draws	(Japan) Emi Mutaguchi; 3–6, 7–6^{(7–2)}, 6–1	(India) Ankita Raina	(India) Shweta Rana (India) Prarthana Thombare	(India) Sai Samhitha Chamarthi (India) Simran Kaur Sethi (India) Eetee Maheta (India) Nidhi Chilumula
April 22, 2013	Lucknow, India; Grass $10,000; Singles and doubles draws	(India) Nidhi Chilumula (Japan) Emi Mutaguchi; 6–4, 7–6^{(7–4)}	(India) Natasha Palha (India) Prarthana Thombare	(India) Shweta Rana (India) Prarthana Thombare	(India) Sai Samhitha Chamarthi (India) Simran Kaur Sethi (India) Eetee Maheta (India) Nidhi Chilumula
April 22, 2013	Ashkelon, Israel; Hard $10,000; Singles and doubles draws	(Israel) Deniz Khazaniuk; 6–4, 6–1	(Russia) Ksenia Kirillova	(Israel) Ekaterina Tour (Ukraine) Anna Bogoslavets	(Russia) Ekaterina Tsiklauri (Israel) Saray Sterenbach (Austria) Pia König (United States) Molly Scott
April 22, 2013	Ashkelon, Israel; Hard $10,000; Singles and doubles draws	(Israel) Deniz Khazaniuk (Russia) Ksenia Kirillova; 6–0, 6–4	(Netherlands) Eva Wacanno (Germany) Anja Wessel	(Israel) Ekaterina Tour (Ukraine) Anna Bogoslavets	(Russia) Ekaterina Tsiklauri (Israel) Saray Sterenbach (Austria) Pia König (United States) Molly Scott
April 22, 2013	San Severo, Italy; Clay $10,000; Singles and doubles draws	(Italy) Giulia Sussarello; 6–3, 6–1	(Netherlands) Cindy Burger	(Italy) Martina Di Giuseppe (Russia) Natalia Orlova	(Armenia) Ani Amiraghyan (Italy) Beatrice Torelli (Italy) Erika Zanchetta (Romania) Cristina Adamescu
April 22, 2013	San Severo, Italy; Clay $10,000; Singles and doubles draws	(Greece) Despina Papamichail (Italy) Giulia Sussarello; Walkover	(Italy) Alice Balducci (Italy) Chiara Mendo	(Italy) Martina Di Giuseppe (Russia) Natalia Orlova	(Armenia) Ani Amiraghyan (Italy) Beatrice Torelli (Italy) Erika Zanchetta (Romania) Cristina Adamescu
April 22, 2013	Les Franqueses del Vallès, Spain; Hard $10,000; Singles and doubles draws	(France) Océane Dodin; 6–3, 6–3	(Switzerland) Tess Sugnaux	(Sweden) Cornelia Lister (Spain) Pilar Domínguez López	(Spain) Olga Sáez Larra (Spain) Ariadne Martí Riembau (Spain) Ana Belzunce Crompin (France) Estelle Cascino
April 22, 2013	Les Franqueses del Vallès, Spain; Hard $10,000; Singles and doubles draws	(Netherlands) Dide Beijer (France) Estelle Cascino; 6–4, 6–7^{(0–7)}, [10–6]	(Sweden) Cornelia Lister (Italy) Sara Sussarello	(Sweden) Cornelia Lister (Spain) Pilar Domínguez López	(Spain) Olga Sáez Larra (Spain) Ariadne Martí Riembau (Spain) Ana Belzunce Crompin (France) Estelle Cascino
April 22, 2013	Antalya, Turkey; Hard $10,000; Singles and doubles draws	(Romania) Ana Bogdan; 4–6, 7–6^{(7–3)}, 6–4	(Slovakia) Zuzana Luknárová	(Belgium) Catherine Chantraine (Brazil) Beatriz Haddad Maia	(Argentina) Andrea Benítez (Ukraine) Nadiya Kolb (Czech Republic) Tereza Martincová (Germany) Caroline Übelhör
April 22, 2013	Antalya, Turkey; Hard $10,000; Singles and doubles draws	(Argentina) Andrea Benítez (Brazil) Carla Forte; 6–1, 6–4	(Belgium) Catherine Chantraine (Russia) Angelina Gabueva	(Belgium) Catherine Chantraine (Brazil) Beatriz Haddad Maia	(Argentina) Andrea Benítez (Ukraine) Nadiya Kolb (Czech Republic) Tereza Martincová (Germany) Caroline Übelhör
April 22, 2013	Bournemouth, United Kingdom; Clay $10,000; Singles and doubles draws	(United Kingdom) Jade Windley; 6–7^{(2–7)}, 6–4, 6–2	(Belarus) Sviatlana Pirazhenka	(Romania) Daiana Negreanu (Belgium) Elyne Boeykens	(United Kingdom) Anna Smith (United Kingdom) Pippa Horn (France) Laëtitia Sarrazin (Australia) Karolina Wlodarczak
April 22, 2013	Bournemouth, United Kingdom; Clay $10,000; Singles and doubles draws	(United Kingdom) Anna Fitzpatrick (United Kingdom) Jade Windley; 6–4, 6–1	(Belgium) Elyne Boeykens (Australia) Karolina Wlodarczak	(Romania) Daiana Negreanu (Belgium) Elyne Boeykens	(United Kingdom) Anna Smith (United Kingdom) Pippa Horn (France) Laëtitia Sarrazin (Australia) Karolina Wlodarczak
April 22, 2013	Andijan, Uzbekistan; Hard $10,000; Singles and doubles draws	(Ukraine) Anastasiya Vasylyeva; 6–4, 7–5	(Georgia (country)) Oksana Kalashnikova	(Russia) Daria Mironova (Russia) Polina Vinogradova	(Ukraine) Veronika Kapshay (Ukraine) Valeriya Strakhova (Uzbekistan) Sabina Sharipova (Uzbekistan) Nigina Abduraimova
April 22, 2013	Andijan, Uzbekistan; Hard $10,000; Singles and doubles draws	(Uzbekistan) Albina Khabibulina (Ukraine) Anastasiya Vasylyeva; 7–5, 6–4	(Russia) Polina Monova (Russia) Ekaterina Yashina	(Russia) Daria Mironova (Russia) Polina Vinogradova	(Ukraine) Veronika Kapshay (Ukraine) Valeriya Strakhova (Uzbekistan) Sabina Sharipova (Uzbekistan) Nigina Abduraimova
April 29, 2013	Kangaroo Cup; Gifu, Japan; Hard $50,000; Singles – Doubles	(Belgium) An-Sophie Mestach; 1–6, 6–3, 6–0	(China) Wang Qiang	(Japan) Yurika Sema (Japan) Sachie Ishizu	(China) Sun Shengnan (Japan) Shuko Aoyama (Uzbekistan) Nigina Abduraimova (China) Duan Yingying
April 29, 2013	Kangaroo Cup; Gifu, Japan; Hard $50,000; Singles – Doubles	(Thailand) Luksika Kumkhum (Japan) Erika Sema; 6–4, 6–3	(Japan) Nao Hibino (Japan) Riko Sawayanagi	(Japan) Yurika Sema (Japan) Sachie Ishizu	(China) Sun Shengnan (Japan) Shuko Aoyama (Uzbekistan) Nigina Abduraimova (China) Duan Yingying
April 29, 2013	Audi Melbourne Pro Tennis Classic; Indian Harbour Beach, United States; Clay $50,000; Singles – Doubles	(Slovenia) Petra Rampre; 6–0, 6–1	(Bulgaria) Dia Evtimova	(Switzerland) Belinda Bencic (United States) Alison Riske	(United States) Jan Abaza (Belarus) Ilona Kremen (Paraguay) Verónica Cepede Royg (United States) Madison Brengle
April 29, 2013	Audi Melbourne Pro Tennis Classic; Indian Harbour Beach, United States; Clay $50,000; Singles – Doubles	(United States) Jan Abaza (United States) Louisa Chirico; 6–4, 6–4	(United States) Asia Muhammad (United States) Allie Will	(Switzerland) Belinda Bencic (United States) Alison Riske	(United States) Jan Abaza (Belarus) Ilona Kremen (Paraguay) Verónica Cepede Royg (United States) Madison Brengle
April 29, 2013	Civitavecchia, Italy; Clay $25,000; Singles and doubles draws	(Slovakia) Anna Karolína Schmiedlová; 6–0, 6–1	(Poland) Magda Linette	(Italy) Corinna Dentoni (Italy) Gioia Barbieri	(France) Alizé Lim (Romania) Cristina Dinu (Liechtenstein) Stephanie Vogt (Hungary) Gréta Arn
April 29, 2013	Civitavecchia, Italy; Clay $25,000; Singles and doubles draws	(Liechtenstein) Stephanie Vogt (Czech Republic) Renata Voráčová; 6–3, 6–4	(Poland) Paula Kania (Poland) Magda Linette	(Italy) Corinna Dentoni (Italy) Gioia Barbieri	(France) Alizé Lim (Romania) Cristina Dinu (Liechtenstein) Stephanie Vogt (Hungary) Gréta Arn
April 29, 2013	Wiesbaden, Germany; Clay $25,000; Singles and doubles draws	(Austria) Yvonne Meusburger; 5–7, 6–4, 6–1	(Canada) Sharon Fichman	(Ukraine) Olga Savchuk (Germany) Dinah Pfizenmaier	(Russia) Alexandra Panova (Russia) Valeria Solovyeva (Serbia) Aleksandra Krunić (Germany) Anna-Lena Friedsam
April 29, 2013	Wiesbaden, Germany; Clay $25,000; Singles and doubles draws	(Canada) Gabriela Dabrowski (Canada) Sharon Fichman; 6–3, 6–3	(Germany) Dinah Pfizenmaier (Germany) Anna Zaja	(Ukraine) Olga Savchuk (Germany) Dinah Pfizenmaier	(Russia) Alexandra Panova (Russia) Valeria Solovyeva (Serbia) Aleksandra Krunić (Germany) Anna-Lena Friedsam
April 29, 2013	Phuket, Thailand; Hard (indoor) $25,000; Singles and doubles draws	(Austria) Melanie Klaffner; 3–6, 6–3, 6–2	(Serbia) Doroteja Erić	(South Korea) Lee So-ra (Chinese Taipei) Lee Ya-hsuan	(Austria) Nicole Rottmann (Thailand) Kamonwan Buayam (Japan) Risa Ozaki (Czech Republic) Martina Borecká
April 29, 2013	Phuket, Thailand; Hard (indoor) $25,000; Singles and doubles draws	(Thailand) Nicha Lertpitaksinchai (Thailand) Peangtarn Plipuech; 6–2, 6–4	(Oman) Fatma Al Nabhani (Chinese Taipei) Lee Ya-hsuan	(South Korea) Lee So-ra (Chinese Taipei) Lee Ya-hsuan	(Austria) Nicole Rottmann (Thailand) Kamonwan Buayam (Japan) Risa Ozaki (Czech Republic) Martina Borecká
April 29, 2013	Caracas, Venezuela; Hard $25,000; Singles and doubles draws	(Slovenia) Tadeja Majerič; 1–6, 6–3, 7–5	(Venezuela) Adriana Pérez	(Argentina) Catalina Pella (Argentina) María Irigoyen	(Chile) Cecilia Costa Melgar (Bolivia) María Fernanda Álvarez Terán (Argentina) Carolina Zeballos (United Kingdom) Amanda Carreras
April 29, 2013	Caracas, Venezuela; Hard $25,000; Singles and doubles draws	(Bolivia) María Fernanda Álvarez Terán (United States) Keri Wong; 6–1, 6–2	(Hungary) Naomi Totka (Brazil) Karina Venditti	(Argentina) Catalina Pella (Argentina) María Irigoyen	(Chile) Cecilia Costa Melgar (Bolivia) María Fernanda Álvarez Terán (Argentina) Carolina Zeballos (United Kingdom) Amanda Carreras
April 29, 2013	Seoul, South Korea; Hard $15,000; Singles and doubles draws	(China) Han Xinyun; 6–2, 6–1	(South Korea) Kim So-jung	(China) Zhang Yuxuan (Chinese Taipei) Chan Chin-wei	(China) Liu Chang (Japan) Shiho Akita (South Korea) Jun Nam-yeon (China) Wen Xin
April 29, 2013	Seoul, South Korea; Hard $15,000; Singles and doubles draws	(China) Liu Wanting (China) Yang Zhaoxuan; 6–2, 6–2	(Chinese Taipei) Chan Chin-wei (China) Zhang Nannan	(China) Zhang Yuxuan (Chinese Taipei) Chan Chin-wei	(China) Liu Chang (Japan) Shiho Akita (South Korea) Jun Nam-yeon (China) Wen Xin
April 29, 2013	Villa Allende, Argentina; Clay $10,000; Singles and doubles draws	(Paraguay) Montserrat González; 6–4, 6–1	(Argentina) Constanza Vega	(Argentina) Victoria Bosio (Chile) Camila Silva	(Argentina) Guadalupe Moreno (Argentina) Aranza Salut (Argentina) Sofia Luini (Chile) Macarena Olivares López
April 29, 2013	Villa Allende, Argentina; Clay $10,000; Singles and doubles draws	(Paraguay) Sara Giménez (Paraguay) Montserrat González; 6–4, 6–0	(Argentina) Victoria Bosio (Argentina) Aranza Salut	(Argentina) Victoria Bosio (Chile) Camila Silva	(Argentina) Guadalupe Moreno (Argentina) Aranza Salut (Argentina) Sofia Luini (Chile) Macarena Olivares López
April 29, 2013	Sharm el-Sheikh, Egypt; Hard $10,000; Singles and doubles draws	(Montenegro) Ana Veselinović; 6–2, 6–3	(Belgium) Klaartje Liebens	(Brazil) Laura Pigossi (Russia) Olga Doroshina	(Austria) Lisa-Maria Moser (Austria) Jeannine Prentner (France) Morgane Pons (Czech Republic) Sandra Hönigová
April 29, 2013	Sharm el-Sheikh, Egypt; Hard $10,000; Singles and doubles draws	(Russia) Anna Morgina (Russia) Yana Sizikova; 6–3, 6–2	(Belgium) Lise Brulmans (Belgium) Klaartje Liebens	(Brazil) Laura Pigossi (Russia) Olga Doroshina	(Austria) Lisa-Maria Moser (Austria) Jeannine Prentner (France) Morgane Pons (Czech Republic) Sandra Hönigová
April 29, 2013	Heraklion, Greece; Carpet $10,000; Singles and doubles draws	(Greece) Valentini Grammatikopoulou; 7–6^{(7–4)}, 3–6, 6–2	(Chinese Taipei) Lee Pei-chi	(Russia) Aminat Kushkhova (Greece) Despoina Vogasari	(Serbia) Tamara Čurović (Republic of Ireland) Amy Bowtell (Bulgaria) Julia Stamatova (Mexico) Ximena Hermoso
April 29, 2013	Heraklion, Greece; Carpet $10,000; Singles and doubles draws	(Serbia) Tamara Čurović (Netherlands) Valeria Podda; 6–3, 6–2	(Mexico) Ximena Hermoso (Spain) Olga Parres Azcoitia	(Russia) Aminat Kushkhova (Greece) Despoina Vogasari	(Serbia) Tamara Čurović (Republic of Ireland) Amy Bowtell (Bulgaria) Julia Stamatova (Mexico) Ximena Hermoso
April 29, 2013	Ashkelon, Israel; Hard $10,000; Singles and doubles draws	(Israel) Deniz Khazaniuk; 6–2, 7–5	(Russia) Ksenia Kirillova	(Israel) Ekaterina Tour (Israel) Keren Shlomo	(Netherlands) Eva Wacanno (Belgium) Hélène Scholsen (Mexico) Carolina Betancourt (Israel) Ester Masuri
April 29, 2013	Ashkelon, Israel; Hard $10,000; Singles and doubles draws	(Austria) Pia König (Israel) Ester Masuri; 1–0, retired	(United Kingdom) Laura Deigman (Israel) Keren Shlomo	(Israel) Ekaterina Tour (Israel) Keren Shlomo	(Netherlands) Eva Wacanno (Belgium) Hélène Scholsen (Mexico) Carolina Betancourt (Israel) Ester Masuri
April 29, 2013	Shymkent, Kazakhstan; Clay $10,000; Singles and doubles draws	(Ukraine) Valeriya Strakhova; 7–5, 6–3	(Russia) Liubov Vasilyeva	(Kazakhstan) Kamila Kerimbayeva (Russia) Alena Tarasova	(Russia) Anna Smolina (Russia) Ksenija Sharifova (Russia) Tamara Pichkhadze (Ukraine) Vladyslava Zanosiyenko
April 29, 2013	Shymkent, Kazakhstan; Clay $10,000; Singles and doubles draws	(Uzbekistan) Albina Khabibulina (Ukraine) Anastasiya Vasylyeva; 2–6, 6–4, [11–9]	(Russia) Polina Monova (Russia) Anna Smolina	(Kazakhstan) Kamila Kerimbayeva (Russia) Alena Tarasova	(Russia) Anna Smolina (Russia) Ksenija Sharifova (Russia) Tamara Pichkhadze (Ukraine) Vladyslava Zanosiyenko
April 29, 2013	Antalya, Turkey; Hard $10,000; Singles and doubles draws	(Romania) Ana Bogdan; 7–6^{(7–4)}, 6–4	(United States) Caitlin Whoriskey	(Russia) Angelina Gabueva (Argentina) Andrea Benítez	(Russia) Mayya Katsitadze (Russia) Shakhlo Saidova (Brazil) Carla Forte (Japan) Nozomi Fujioka
April 29, 2013	Antalya, Turkey; Hard $10,000; Singles and doubles draws	(Argentina) Andrea Benítez (Brazil) Carla Forte; 4–6, 7–5, [10–7]	(United States) Rosalia Alda (United States) Caitlin Whoriskey	(Russia) Angelina Gabueva (Argentina) Andrea Benítez	(Russia) Mayya Katsitadze (Russia) Shakhlo Saidova (Brazil) Carla Forte (Japan) Nozomi Fujioka
April 29, 2013	Edinburgh, United Kingdom; Clay $10,000; Singles and doubles draws	(France) Laëtitia Sarrazin; 7–5, 6–7^{(9–11)}, 6–2	(United Kingdom) Anna Smith	(Belgium) Elyne Boeykens (United Kingdom) Katy Dunne	(Serbia) Ivana Jorović (Switzerland) Lara Michel (Germany) Carolin Daniels (Sweden) Malin Ulvefeldt
April 29, 2013	Edinburgh, United Kingdom; Clay $10,000; Singles and doubles draws	(Estonia) Anett Kontaveit (United Kingdom) Jessica Ren; 6–2, 6–3	(United Kingdom) Anna Smith (United Kingdom) Francesca Stephenson	(Belgium) Elyne Boeykens (United Kingdom) Katy Dunne	(Serbia) Ivana Jorović (Switzerland) Lara Michel (Germany) Carolin Daniels (Sweden) Malin Ulvefeldt

=== May ===
Week of	Tournament	Winner	Runners-up	Semifinalists	Quarterfinalists
May 6, 2013	Open GDF Suez de Cagnes-sur-Mer Alpes-Maritimes; Cagnes-sur-Mer, France; Clay $100,000; Singles – Doubles	(France) Caroline Garcia; 6–0, 4–6, 6–3	(Ukraine) Maryna Zanevska	(Switzerland) Romina Oprandi (Spain) Estrella Cabeza Candela	(France) Virginie Razzano (United States) Vania King (Germany) Tatjana Maria (Luxembourg) Mandy Minella
May 6, 2013	Open GDF Suez de Cagnes-sur-Mer Alpes-Maritimes; Cagnes-sur-Mer, France; Clay $100,000; Singles – Doubles	(United States) Vania King (Netherlands) Arantxa Rus; 4–6, 7–5, [10–8]	(Colombia) Catalina Castaño (Brazil) Teliana Pereira	(Switzerland) Romina Oprandi (Spain) Estrella Cabeza Candela	(France) Virginie Razzano (United States) Vania King (Germany) Tatjana Maria (Luxembourg) Mandy Minella
May 6, 2013	Empire Slovak Open; Trnava, Slovakia; Clay $75,000; Singles – Doubles	(Czech Republic) Barbora Záhlavová-Strýcová; 6–2, 6–4	(Italy) Karin Knapp	(Serbia) Aleksandra Krunić (Argentina) Paula Ormaechea	(Croatia) Tereza Mrdeža (Czech Republic) Kateřina Siniaková (Slovakia) Kristína Kučová (Slovakia) Anna Karolína Schmiedlová
May 6, 2013	Empire Slovak Open; Trnava, Slovakia; Clay $75,000; Singles – Doubles	(Bosnia and Herzegovina) Mervana Jugić-Salkić (Czech Republic) Renata Voráčová; 6–1, 6–1	(Slovakia) Jana Čepelová (Slovakia) Anna Karolína Schmiedlová	(Serbia) Aleksandra Krunić (Argentina) Paula Ormaechea	(Croatia) Tereza Mrdeža (Czech Republic) Kateřina Siniaková (Slovakia) Kristína Kučová (Slovakia) Anna Karolína Schmiedlová
May 6, 2013	Soweto Open; Johannesburg, South Africa; Hard $50,000+H; Singles – Doubles	(Hungary) Tímea Babos; 6–7^{(3–7)}, 6–4, 6–1	(South Africa) Chanel Simmonds	(Serbia) Teodora Mirčić (Ukraine) Nadiia Kichenok	(United Kingdom) Samantha Murray (Slovenia) Tadeja Majerič (United Kingdom) Jade Windley (Israel) Julia Glushko
May 6, 2013	Soweto Open; Johannesburg, South Africa; Hard $50,000+H; Singles – Doubles	(Poland) Magda Linette (South Africa) Chanel Simmonds; 6–1, 6–3	(United Kingdom) Samantha Murray (United Kingdom) Jade Windley	(Serbia) Teodora Mirčić (Ukraine) Nadiia Kichenok	(United Kingdom) Samantha Murray (Slovenia) Tadeja Majerič (United Kingdom) Jade Windley (Israel) Julia Glushko
May 6, 2013	Fukuoka International Women's Cup; Fukuoka, Japan; Grass $50,000; Singles – Doubles	(Tunisia) Ons Jabeur; 7–6^{(7–2)}, 6–2	(Belgium) An-Sophie Mestach	(Japan) Junri Namigata (Uzbekistan) Nigina Abduraimova	(Australia) Storm Sanders (Kazakhstan) Zarina Diyas (Japan) Eri Hozumi (Japan) Erika Sema
May 6, 2013	Fukuoka International Women's Cup; Fukuoka, Japan; Grass $50,000; Singles – Doubles	(Japan) Junri Namigata (Japan) Erika Sema; 7–5, 3–6, [10–7]	(Japan) Rika Fujiwara (Japan) Akiko Omae	(Japan) Junri Namigata (Uzbekistan) Nigina Abduraimova	(Australia) Storm Sanders (Kazakhstan) Zarina Diyas (Japan) Eri Hozumi (Japan) Erika Sema
May 6, 2013	RBC Bank Women's Challenger; Raleigh, United States; Clay $25,000; Singles and doubles draws	(United States) Asia Muhammad; 6–2, 6–2	(United States) Chalena Scholl	(United States) Samantha Crawford (Venezuela) Adriana Pérez	(United States) Hayley Carter (United States) Jamie Loeb (Japan) Mayo Hibi (Ukraine) Alyona Sotnikova
May 6, 2013	RBC Bank Women's Challenger; Raleigh, United States; Clay $25,000; Singles and doubles draws	(United States) Asia Muhammad (United States) Allie Will; 6–3, 6–3	(Australia) Jessica Moore (Australia) Sally Peers	(United States) Samantha Crawford (Venezuela) Adriana Pérez	(United States) Hayley Carter (United States) Jamie Loeb (Japan) Mayo Hibi (Ukraine) Alyona Sotnikova
May 6, 2013	Seoul, South Korea; Hard $15,000; Singles and doubles draws	(China) Zhou Yimiao; 6–2, 6–1	(South Korea) Han Na-lae	(China) Liu Fangzhou (China) Wen Xin	(China) Han Xinyun (China) Zhang Yuxuan (China) Chen Jiahui (China) Zhu Lin
May 6, 2013	Seoul, South Korea; Hard $15,000; Singles and doubles draws	(China) Han Xinyun (China) Ye Qiuyu; 7–6^{(7–3)}, 4–6, [10–5]	(Chinese Taipei) Chan Chin-wei (China) Zhang Nannan	(China) Liu Fangzhou (China) Wen Xin	(China) Han Xinyun (China) Zhang Yuxuan (China) Chen Jiahui (China) Zhu Lin
May 6, 2013	Villa María, Argentina; Clay $10,000; Singles and doubles draws	(Paraguay) Montserrat González; 6–3, 4–6, 6–3	(Chile) Camila Silva	(Argentina) Sofía Blanco (Argentina) Victoria Bosio	(Argentina) Francesca Rescaldini (Argentina) Constanza Vega (Argentina) Aranza Salut (Chile) Macarena Olivares López
May 6, 2013	Villa María, Argentina; Clay $10,000; Singles and doubles draws	(Mexico) Ana Sofía Sánchez (Chile) Camila Silva; 6–1, 6–2	(Argentina) Victoria Bosio (Argentina) Aranza Salut	(Argentina) Sofía Blanco (Argentina) Victoria Bosio	(Argentina) Francesca Rescaldini (Argentina) Constanza Vega (Argentina) Aranza Salut (Chile) Macarena Olivares López
May 6, 2013	Sharm el-Sheikh, Egypt; Hard $10,000; Singles and doubles draws	(Turkey) İpek Soylu; 7–5, 6–1	(Italy) Camilla Rosatello	(Montenegro) Ana Veselinović (Switzerland) Tess Sugnaux	(China) Zhu Aiwen (Bosnia and Herzegovina) Dea Herdželaš (Russia) Anna Morgina (Netherlands) Indy de Vroome
May 6, 2013	Sharm el-Sheikh, Egypt; Hard $10,000; Singles and doubles draws	(Italy) Carolina Petrelli (Montenegro) Ana Veselinović; 3–6, 7–5, [10–7]	(Ukraine) Anastasia Kharchenko (Russia) Anna Morgina	(Montenegro) Ana Veselinović (Switzerland) Tess Sugnaux	(China) Zhu Aiwen (Bosnia and Herzegovina) Dea Herdželaš (Russia) Anna Morgina (Netherlands) Indy de Vroome
May 6, 2013	Marathon-Athens, Greece; Hard $10,000; Singles and doubles draws	(Chinese Taipei) Lee Pei-chi; 6–1, 7–5	(Serbia) Marina Kachar	(Greece) Aggeliki Kokkota (Greece) Despoina Vogasari	(Mexico) Ximena Hermoso (Croatia) Silvia Njirić (Brazil) Gabriela Cé (Serbia) Dejana Radanović
May 6, 2013	Marathon-Athens, Greece; Hard $10,000; Singles and doubles draws	(United States) Erin Clark (United Kingdom) Francesca Stephenson; 5–7, 6–3, [10–8]	(Croatia) Matea Mezak (Croatia) Silvia Njirić	(Greece) Aggeliki Kokkota (Greece) Despoina Vogasari	(Mexico) Ximena Hermoso (Croatia) Silvia Njirić (Brazil) Gabriela Cé (Serbia) Dejana Radanović
May 6, 2013	Ramat HaSharon, Israel; Hard $10,000; Singles and doubles draws	(Israel) Deniz Khazaniuk; 6–3, 6–3	(Israel) Ekaterina Tour	(Israel) Lee Or (United States) Molly Scott	(Russia) Ekaterina Tsiklauri (United Kingdom) Laura Deigman (Germany) Alina Wessel (Israel) Saray Sterenbach
May 6, 2013	Ramat HaSharon, Israel; Hard $10,000; Singles and doubles draws	(Mexico) Carolina Betancourt (United States) Molly Scott; 6–7^{(2–7)}, 6–4, [10–4]	(Israel) Ekaterina Tour (Germany) Alina Wessel	(Israel) Lee Or (United States) Molly Scott	(Russia) Ekaterina Tsiklauri (United Kingdom) Laura Deigman (Germany) Alina Wessel (Israel) Saray Sterenbach
May 6, 2013	Santa Margherita di Pula, Italy; Clay $10,000; Singles and doubles draws	(Ukraine) Sofiya Kovalets; 6–4, 1–6, 6–4	(Italy) Anna Floris	(Italy) Elisa Salis (Italy) Annalisa Bona	(France) Laëtitia Sarrazin (France) Clothilde de Bernardi (Italy) Martina Caregaro (France) Manon Arcangioli
May 6, 2013	Santa Margherita di Pula, Italy; Clay $10,000; Singles and doubles draws	(Italy) Martina Caregaro (Italy) Anna Floris; 6–2, 6–3	(Italy) Annalisa Bona (Switzerland) Lisa Sabino	(Italy) Elisa Salis (Italy) Annalisa Bona	(France) Laëtitia Sarrazin (France) Clothilde de Bernardi (Italy) Martina Caregaro (France) Manon Arcangioli
May 6, 2013	Shymkent, Kazakhstan; Clay $10,000; Singles and doubles draws	(Kyrgyzstan) Ksenia Palkina; 6–3, 5–7, 6–1	(Kazakhstan) Kamila Kerimbayeva	(Russia) Liubov Vasilyeva (Uzbekistan) Vlada Ekshibarova	(Russia) Anna Smolina (Russia) Alena Tarasova (Russia) Anastasia Rudakova (Ukraine) Vladyslava Zanosiyenko
May 6, 2013	Shymkent, Kazakhstan; Clay $10,000; Singles and doubles draws	(Uzbekistan) Albina Khabibulina (Kyrgyzstan) Ksenia Palkina; 6–2, 6–2	(Russia) Polina Monova (Russia) Anna Smolina	(Russia) Liubov Vasilyeva (Uzbekistan) Vlada Ekshibarova	(Russia) Anna Smolina (Russia) Alena Tarasova (Russia) Anastasia Rudakova (Ukraine) Vladyslava Zanosiyenko
May 6, 2013	Båstad, Sweden; Clay $10,000; Singles and doubles draws	(Belgium) Ysaline Bonaventure; 6–1, 6–2	(Sweden) Ellen Allgurin	(Denmark) Karina Jacobsgaard (Germany) Nicola Geuer	(United States) Tori Kinard (Sweden) Jacqueline Cabaj Awad (France) Océane Adam (Sweden) Beatrice Cedermark
May 6, 2013	Båstad, Sweden; Clay $10,000; Singles and doubles draws	(Netherlands) Cindy Burger (Serbia) Milana Špremo; 6–1, 6–4	(Belgium) Ysaline Bonaventure (Russia) Maria Mokh	(Denmark) Karina Jacobsgaard (Germany) Nicola Geuer	(United States) Tori Kinard (Sweden) Jacqueline Cabaj Awad (France) Océane Adam (Sweden) Beatrice Cedermark
May 6, 2013	Antalya, Turkey; Hard $10,000; Singles and doubles draws	(Brazil) Carla Forte; 7–6^{(7–3)}, 7–5	(United States) Caitlin Whoriskey	(Argentina) Andrea Benítez (Ukraine) Anna Shkudun	(Russia) Angelina Gabueva (Belarus) Darya Lebesheva (China) Gai Ao (Turkey) Sultan Gönen
May 6, 2013	Antalya, Turkey; Hard $10,000; Singles and doubles draws	(Russia) Shakhlo Saidova (Ukraine) Anna Shkudun; 4–6, 6–2, [10–8]	(Argentina) Andrea Benítez (Brazil) Carla Forte	(Argentina) Andrea Benítez (Ukraine) Anna Shkudun	(Russia) Angelina Gabueva (Belarus) Darya Lebesheva (China) Gai Ao (Turkey) Sultan Gönen
May 13, 2013	Sparta Prague Open; Prague, Czech Republic; Clay $100,000; Singles – Doubles	(Czech Republic) Lucie Šafářová; 3–6, 6–1, 6–1	(Romania) Alexandra Cadanțu	(United States) Irina Falconi (Slovakia) Jana Čepelová	(United States) Maria Sanchez (Serbia) Vesna Dolonc (Czech Republic) Barbora Záhlavová-Strýcová (Puerto Rico) Monica Puig
May 13, 2013	Sparta Prague Open; Prague, Czech Republic; Clay $100,000; Singles – Doubles	(Czech Republic) Renata Voráčová (Czech Republic) Barbora Záhlavová-Strýcová; 6–4, 6–0	(United States) Irina Falconi (Czech Republic) Eva Hrdinová	(United States) Irina Falconi (Slovakia) Jana Čepelová	(United States) Maria Sanchez (Serbia) Vesna Dolonc (Czech Republic) Barbora Záhlavová-Strýcová (Puerto Rico) Monica Puig
May 13, 2013	Open Saint-Gaudens Midi-Pyrénées; Saint-Gaudens, France; Clay $50,000+H; Singles – Doubles	(Argentina) Paula Ormaechea; 6–3, 3–6, 6–4	(Germany) Dinah Pfizenmaier	(United States) Vania King (France) Claire Feuerstein	(Brazil) Teliana Pereira (Canada) Sharon Fichman (Germany) Anna-Lena Friedsam (Russia) Valeria Solovyeva
May 13, 2013	Open Saint-Gaudens Midi-Pyrénées; Saint-Gaudens, France; Clay $50,000+H; Singles – Doubles	(Israel) Julia Glushko (Argentina) Paula Ormaechea; 7–5, 7–6^{(13–11)}	(Canada) Stéphanie Dubois (Japan) Kurumi Nara	(United States) Vania King (France) Claire Feuerstein	(Brazil) Teliana Pereira (Canada) Sharon Fichman (Germany) Anna-Lena Friedsam (Russia) Valeria Solovyeva
May 13, 2013	Kurume Best Amenity Cup; Kurume, Japan; Grass $50,000; Singles – Doubles	(Tunisia) Ons Jabeur; 6–0, 6–2	(Belgium) An-Sophie Mestach	(Japan) Junri Namigata (Kazakhstan) Zarina Diyas	(China) Zheng Saisai (Japan) Sachie Ishizu (Switzerland) Amra Sadiković (Japan) Mari Tanaka
May 13, 2013	Kurume Best Amenity Cup; Kurume, Japan; Grass $50,000; Singles – Doubles	(Japan) Kanae Hisami (Japan) Mari Tanaka; 6–4, 7–6^{(7–2)}	(Japan) Rika Fujiwara (Japan) Akiko Omae	(Japan) Junri Namigata (Kazakhstan) Zarina Diyas	(China) Zheng Saisai (Japan) Sachie Ishizu (Switzerland) Amra Sadiković (Japan) Mari Tanaka
May 13, 2013	Balikpapan, Indonesia; Hard $25,000; Singles and doubles draws	(Serbia) Jovana Jakšić; 6–3, 6–2	(China) Yang Zi	(Indonesia) Lavinia Tananta (Serbia) Teodora Mirčić	(Russia) Arina Rodionova (Chinese Taipei) Lee Ya-hsuan (China) Xu Yifan (China) Wen Xin
May 13, 2013	Balikpapan, Indonesia; Hard $25,000; Singles and doubles draws	(United Kingdom) Naomi Broady (Serbia) Teodora Mirčić; 6–3, 6–3	(Chinese Taipei) Chen Yi (China) Xu Yifan	(Indonesia) Lavinia Tananta (Serbia) Teodora Mirčić	(Russia) Arina Rodionova (Chinese Taipei) Lee Ya-hsuan (China) Xu Yifan (China) Wen Xin
May 13, 2013	Sharm el-Sheikh, Egypt; Hard $10,000; Singles and doubles draws	(Turkey) Melis Sezer; 6–2, 4–6, 6–3	(Turkey) Başak Eraydın	(Belgium) Klaartje Liebens (Italy) Camilla Rosatello	(Poland) Magdalena Fręch (Russia) Anastasiya Saitova (Bosnia and Herzegovina) Dea Herdželaš (Switzerland) Tess Sugnaux
May 13, 2013	Sharm el-Sheikh, Egypt; Hard $10,000; Singles and doubles draws	(United Kingdom) Anna Fitzpatrick (Montenegro) Ana Veselinović; 2–6, 6–4, [10–3]	(Turkey) Başak Eraydın (Turkey) Melis Sezer	(Belgium) Klaartje Liebens (Italy) Camilla Rosatello	(Poland) Magdalena Fręch (Russia) Anastasiya Saitova (Bosnia and Herzegovina) Dea Herdželaš (Switzerland) Tess Sugnaux
May 13, 2013	Marathon-Athens, Greece; Hard $10,000; Singles and doubles draws	(Estonia) Anett Kontaveit; 6–4, 6–7^{(6–8)}, 6–3	(United Kingdom) Lucy Brown	(Serbia) Marina Kachar (Brazil) Gabriela Cé	(Bulgaria) Julia Stamatova (Romania) Ágnes Szatmári (Greece) Despina Papamichail (Serbia) Barbara Bonić
May 13, 2013	Marathon-Athens, Greece; Hard $10,000; Singles and doubles draws	(North Macedonia) Lina Gjorcheska (Greece) Despoina Vogasari; 6–4, 2–6, [10–6]	(United Kingdom) Laura Deigman (Estonia) Anett Kontaveit	(Serbia) Marina Kachar (Brazil) Gabriela Cé	(Bulgaria) Julia Stamatova (Romania) Ágnes Szatmári (Greece) Despina Papamichail (Serbia) Barbara Bonić
May 13, 2013	Santa Margherita di Pula, Italy; Clay $10,000; Singles and doubles draws	(Ukraine) Sofiya Kovalets; 6–3, 6–2	(Canada) Carol Zhao	(Romania) Bianca Hîncu (Italy) Anastasia Grymalska	(Italy) Anna Floris (Hungary) Vanda Lukács (Czech Republic) Barbora Štefková (Italy) Giorgia Marchetti
May 13, 2013	Santa Margherita di Pula, Italy; Clay $10,000; Singles and doubles draws	(Italy) Martina Caregaro (Italy) Anna Floris; 6–2, 5–7, [10–7]	(Canada) Erin Routliffe (Canada) Carol Zhao	(Romania) Bianca Hîncu (Italy) Anastasia Grymalska	(Italy) Anna Floris (Hungary) Vanda Lukács (Czech Republic) Barbora Štefková (Italy) Giorgia Marchetti
May 13, 2013	Monzón, Spain; Hard $10,000; Singles and doubles draws	(Russia) Polina Vinogradova; 6–1, 6–1	(Spain) Nuria Párrizas Díaz	(Spain) Paula Badosa (Spain) Lucía Cervera Vázquez	(Germany) Bianca Koch (Italy) Alice Savoretti (Russia) Yana Sizikova (United Kingdom) Manisha Foster
May 13, 2013	Monzón, Spain; Hard $10,000; Singles and doubles draws	(Argentina) Tatiana Búa (Spain) Lucía Cervera Vázquez; 4–6, 7–5, [10–6]	(Spain) Arabela Fernández Rabener (Russia) Yana Sizikova	(Spain) Paula Badosa (Spain) Lucía Cervera Vázquez	(Germany) Bianca Koch (Italy) Alice Savoretti (Russia) Yana Sizikova (United Kingdom) Manisha Foster
May 13, 2013	Båstad, Sweden; Clay $10,000; Singles and doubles draws	(Sweden) Rebecca Peterson; 6–3, 6–2	(Slovakia) Zuzana Luknárová	(Germany) Laura Schaeder (Sweden) Ellen Allgurin	(Sweden) Susanne Celik (Sweden) Malin Ulvefeldt (Sweden) Matilda Hamlin (United States) Tori Kinard
May 13, 2013	Båstad, Sweden; Clay $10,000; Singles and doubles draws	(Sweden) Ellen Allgurin (Sweden) Beatrice Cedermark; 6–3, 6–0	(Sweden) Rebecca Peterson (Sweden) Malin Ulvefeldt	(Germany) Laura Schaeder (Sweden) Ellen Allgurin	(Sweden) Susanne Celik (Sweden) Malin Ulvefeldt (Sweden) Matilda Hamlin (United States) Tori Kinard
May 13, 2013	Antalya, Turkey; Hard $10,000; Singles and doubles draws	(Ukraine) Olga Ianchuk; 6–3, 6–3	(Slovakia) Zuzana Zlochová	(Russia) Angelina Gabueva (Argentina) Andrea Benítez	(Czech Republic) Martina Kubičíková (Brazil) Carla Forte (Ukraine) Anna Shkudun (Belarus) Darya Lebesheva
May 13, 2013	Antalya, Turkey; Hard $10,000; Singles and doubles draws	(Ukraine) Olga Ianchuk (Belarus) Darya Lebesheva; 3–6, 7–5, [10–8]	(Japan) Nozomi Fujioka (Japan) Hirono Watanabe	(Russia) Angelina Gabueva (Argentina) Andrea Benítez	(Czech Republic) Martina Kubičíková (Brazil) Carla Forte (Ukraine) Anna Shkudun (Belarus) Darya Lebesheva
May 13, 2013	Landisville, United States; Hard $10,000; Singles and doubles draws	(Russia) Alisa Kleybanova; 6–3, 6–0	(United States) Natalie Pluskota	(United States) Brooke Austin (Japan) Hiroko Kuwata	(Bolivia) María Fernanda Álvarez Terán (Russia) Nika Kukharchuk (Canada) Sonja Molnar (Canada) Élisabeth Fournier
May 13, 2013	Landisville, United States; Hard $10,000; Singles and doubles draws	(Bolivia) María Fernanda Álvarez Terán (United States) Keri Wong; 2–6, 6–4, [10–5]	(United States) Brooke Austin (Australia) Brooke Rischbieth	(United States) Brooke Austin (Japan) Hiroko Kuwata	(Bolivia) María Fernanda Álvarez Terán (Russia) Nika Kukharchuk (Canada) Sonja Molnar (Canada) Élisabeth Fournier
May 20, 2013	Tarakan, Indonesia; Hard (indoor) $25,000; Singles and doubles draws	(Serbia) Jovana Jakšić; 6–3, 6–2	(China) Li Ting	(China) Liang Chen (Thailand) Nungnadda Wannasuk	(Australia) Alison Bai (United Kingdom) Lisa Whybourn (China) Tang Haochen (China) Dong Xiaorong
May 20, 2013	Tarakan, Indonesia; Hard (indoor) $25,000; Singles and doubles draws	(United Kingdom) Naomi Broady (Serbia) Teodora Mirčić; 6–2, 1–6, [10–5]	(China) Tang Haochen (China) Tian Ran	(China) Liang Chen (Thailand) Nungnadda Wannasuk	(Australia) Alison Bai (United Kingdom) Lisa Whybourn (China) Tang Haochen (China) Dong Xiaorong
May 20, 2013	Caserta, Italy; Clay $25,000; Singles and doubles draws	(Czech Republic) Renata Voráčová; 6–4, 6–1	(Brazil) Beatriz Haddad Maia	(Austria) Melanie Klaffner (Georgia (country)) Margalita Chakhnashvili	(Italy) Giulia Gatto-Monticone (Latvia) Diāna Marcinkēviča (Montenegro) Danka Kovinić (Czech Republic) Denisa Allertová
May 20, 2013	Caserta, Italy; Clay $25,000; Singles and doubles draws	(Montenegro) Danka Kovinić (Czech Republic) Renata Voráčová; 6–4, 7–6^{(7–3)}	(Romania) Ana Bogdan (Romania) Cristina Dinu	(Austria) Melanie Klaffner (Georgia (country)) Margalita Chakhnashvili	(Italy) Giulia Gatto-Monticone (Latvia) Diāna Marcinkēviča (Montenegro) Danka Kovinić (Czech Republic) Denisa Allertová
May 20, 2013	Karuizawa, Japan; Grass $25,000; Singles and doubles draws	(Japan) Eri Hozumi; 7–6^{(7–5)}, 6–3	(Japan) Junri Namigata	(Ukraine) Tetyana Arefyeva (Japan) Sachie Ishizu	(Japan) Mana Ayukawa (Japan) Yurina Koshino (Japan) Shiho Akita (Japan) Mari Tanaka
May 20, 2013	Karuizawa, Japan; Grass $25,000; Singles and doubles draws	(Japan) Shiho Akita (Japan) Sachie Ishizu; 7–5, 7–6^{(10–8)}	(Japan) Miki Miyamura (Japan) Erika Takao	(Ukraine) Tetyana Arefyeva (Japan) Sachie Ishizu	(Japan) Mana Ayukawa (Japan) Yurina Koshino (Japan) Shiho Akita (Japan) Mari Tanaka
May 20, 2013	Casablanca, Morocco; Clay $25,000; Singles and doubles draws	(Spain) Laura Pous Tió; 6–3, 6–0	(Poland) Sandra Zaniewska	(Bulgaria) Elitsa Kostova (Turkey) Pemra Özgen	(Venezuela) Andrea Gámiz (Russia) Victoria Kan (Slovakia) Michaela Hončová (France) Laura Thorpe
May 20, 2013	Casablanca, Morocco; Clay $25,000; Singles and doubles draws	(Germany) Justine Ozga (Germany) Anna Zaja; 6–4, 6–2	(Bulgaria) Elitsa Kostova (Poland) Sandra Zaniewska	(Bulgaria) Elitsa Kostova (Turkey) Pemra Özgen	(Venezuela) Andrea Gámiz (Russia) Victoria Kan (Slovakia) Michaela Hončová (France) Laura Thorpe
May 20, 2013	Goyang, South Korea; Hard $25,000; Singles and doubles draws	(China) Duan Yingying; 6–3, 6–4	(China) Liu Fangzhou	(Japan) Misa Eguchi (South Korea) Lee Ye-ra	(Japan) Risa Ozaki (China) Sun Shengnan (Japan) Nao Hibino (South Korea) Yoo Mi
May 20, 2013	Goyang, South Korea; Hard $25,000; Singles and doubles draws	(Japan) Nao Hibino (Japan) Akiko Omae; 6–4, 6–4	(South Korea) Han Na-lae (South Korea) Yoo Mi	(Japan) Misa Eguchi (South Korea) Lee Ye-ra	(Japan) Risa Ozaki (China) Sun Shengnan (Japan) Nao Hibino (South Korea) Yoo Mi
May 20, 2013	Sharm el-Sheikh, Egypt; Hard $10,000; Singles and doubles draws	(Serbia) Barbara Bonić; 6–3, 6–1	(Ukraine) Anastasia Kharchenko	(Turkey) Başak Eraydın (Turkey) Melis Sezer	(United Kingdom) Anna Fitzpatrick (Kazakhstan) Kamila Kerimbayeva (Belarus) Viktoryia Mun (Switzerland) Samira Giger
May 20, 2013	Sharm el-Sheikh, Egypt; Hard $10,000; Singles and doubles draws	(Italy) Camilla Rosatello (China) Zhu Aiwen; 6–4, 6–3	(United Kingdom) Anna Fitzpatrick (Kazakhstan) Kamila Kerimbayeva	(Turkey) Başak Eraydın (Turkey) Melis Sezer	(United Kingdom) Anna Fitzpatrick (Kazakhstan) Kamila Kerimbayeva (Belarus) Viktoryia Mun (Switzerland) Samira Giger
May 20, 2013	Marathon-Athens, Greece; Hard $10,000; Singles and doubles draws	(Chinese Taipei) Lee Pei-chi; 6–2, 6–3	(Greece) Despoina Vogasari	(Austria) Pia König (Belarus) Sviatlana Pirazhenka	(Serbia) Dunja Stamenković (Greece) Eleni Kordolaimi (Greece) Martha Matoula (Bulgaria) Julia Stamatova
May 20, 2013	Marathon-Athens, Greece; Hard $10,000; Singles and doubles draws	(Netherlands) Gabriela van de Graaf (Belarus) Sviatlana Pirazhenka; 1–6, 7–5, [10–7]	(Greece) Eleni Kordolaimi (Greece) Despoina Vogasari	(Austria) Pia König (Belarus) Sviatlana Pirazhenka	(Serbia) Dunja Stamenković (Greece) Eleni Kordolaimi (Greece) Martha Matoula (Bulgaria) Julia Stamatova
May 20, 2013	Timișoara, Romania; Clay $10,000; Singles and doubles draws	(Switzerland) Xenia Knoll; 3–6, 6–2, 7–5	(Romania) Bianca Hîncu	(Czech Republic) Tereza Malíková (Romania) Oana Georgeta Simion	(Philippines) Katharina Lehnert (Romania) Alexandra Damaschin (Romania) Ioana Loredana Roșca (Czech Republic) Sandra Hönigová
May 20, 2013	Timișoara, Romania; Clay $10,000; Singles and doubles draws	(Romania) Elena-Teodora Cadar (Romania) Raluca Elena Platon; 6–3, 1–6, [10–7]	(Romania) Alexandra Damaschin (Romania) Bianca Hîncu	(Czech Republic) Tereza Malíková (Romania) Oana Georgeta Simion	(Philippines) Katharina Lehnert (Romania) Alexandra Damaschin (Romania) Ioana Loredana Roșca (Czech Republic) Sandra Hönigová
May 20, 2013	Girona, Spain; Clay $10,000; Singles and doubles draws	(Spain) Lucía Cervera Vázquez; 6–0, 6–1	(France) Marine Partaud	(Netherlands) Lisanne van Riet (Italy) Giulia Sussarello	(Germany) Bianca Koch (France) Joséphine Boualem (Spain) Aida Martínez Sanjuán (Spain) Pilar Domínguez López
May 20, 2013	Girona, Spain; Clay $10,000; Singles and doubles draws	(Spain) Yvonne Cavallé Reimers (Spain) Lucía Cervera Vázquez; 7–6^{(7–4)}, 6–4	(Italy) Gaia Sanesi (Italy) Giulia Sussarello	(Netherlands) Lisanne van Riet (Italy) Giulia Sussarello	(Germany) Bianca Koch (France) Joséphine Boualem (Spain) Aida Martínez Sanjuán (Spain) Pilar Domínguez López
May 20, 2013	Antalya, Turkey; Hard $10,000; Singles and doubles draws	(Ukraine) Olga Ianchuk; 6–3, 7–6^{(7–4)}	(Czech Republic) Martina Kubičíková	(Czech Republic) Petra Rohanová (Slovakia) Vivien Juhászová	(Japan) Hirono Watanabe (China) Xun Fangying (Brazil) Carla Forte (Germany) Laura Schaeder
May 20, 2013	Antalya, Turkey; Hard $10,000; Singles and doubles draws	(China) Gai Ao (Turkey) Sultan Gönen; 3–6, 7–5, [10–6]	(Argentina) Andrea Benítez (Brazil) Carla Forte	(Czech Republic) Petra Rohanová (Slovakia) Vivien Juhászová	(Japan) Hirono Watanabe (China) Xun Fangying (Brazil) Carla Forte (Germany) Laura Schaeder
May 20, 2013	Sumter, United States; Hard $10,000; Singles and doubles draws	(United States) Jamie Loeb; 6–4, 6–3	(United States) Brooke Austin	(Canada) Élisabeth Fournier (Japan) Hiroko Kuwata	(Australia) Maddison Inglis (United States) Alexandra Morozova (United States) Alexandra Mueller (Finland) Piia Suomalainen
May 20, 2013	Sumter, United States; Hard $10,000; Singles and doubles draws	(United States) Kristy Frilling (United States) Alexandra Mueller; 6–4, 6–3	(United States) Jamie Loeb (United States) Sanaz Marand	(Canada) Élisabeth Fournier (Japan) Hiroko Kuwata	(Australia) Maddison Inglis (United States) Alexandra Morozova (United States) Alexandra Mueller (Finland) Piia Suomalainen
May 27, 2013	Grado, Italy; Clay $25,000; Singles and doubles draws	(Austria) Yvonne Meusburger; 6–2, 6–7^{(2–7)}, 6–3	(Poland) Katarzyna Piter	(Germany) Anne Schäfer (Italy) Alberta Brianti	(Switzerland) Viktorija Golubic (China) Zhou Yimiao (Italy) Anna Floris (Czech Republic) Tereza Martincová
May 27, 2013	Grado, Italy; Clay $25,000; Singles and doubles draws	(Japan) Yurika Sema (China) Zhou Yimiao; 1–6, 7–5, [10–7]	(Switzerland) Viktorija Golubic (Latvia) Diāna Marcinkēviča	(Germany) Anne Schäfer (Italy) Alberta Brianti	(Switzerland) Viktorija Golubic (China) Zhou Yimiao (Italy) Anna Floris (Czech Republic) Tereza Martincová
May 27, 2013	Moscow, Russia; Clay $25,000; Singles and doubles draws	(Estonia) Anett Kontaveit; 6–1, 6–1	(Turkey) Çağla Büyükakçay	(Russia) Marina Melnikova (Russia) Polina Vinogradova	(Russia) Ksenia Kirillova (Georgia (country)) Sofia Shapatava (Belarus) Aliaksandra Sasnovich (Russia) Yuliya Kalabina
May 27, 2013	Moscow, Russia; Clay $25,000; Singles and doubles draws	(Russia) Ksenia Kirillova (Russia) Polina Monova; 1–6, 6–4, [10–4]	(Russia) Eugeniya Pashkova (Ukraine) Anastasiya Vasylyeva	(Russia) Marina Melnikova (Russia) Polina Vinogradova	(Russia) Ksenia Kirillova (Georgia (country)) Sofia Shapatava (Belarus) Aliaksandra Sasnovich (Russia) Yuliya Kalabina
May 27, 2013	Infond Open; Maribor, Slovenia; Clay $25,000; Singles and doubles draws	(Slovenia) Polona Hercog; 3–6, 6–3, 6–3	(Croatia) Ana Konjuh	(Slovakia) Kristína Kučová (Czech Republic) Tereza Smitková	(Poland) Paula Kania (Italy) Anastasia Grymalska (Netherlands) Cindy Burger (Montenegro) Danka Kovinić
May 27, 2013	Infond Open; Maribor, Slovenia; Clay $25,000; Singles and doubles draws	(Poland) Paula Kania (Poland) Magda Linette; 6–3, 6–0	(Argentina) Mailen Auroux (Argentina) María Irigoyen	(Slovakia) Kristína Kučová (Czech Republic) Tereza Smitková	(Poland) Paula Kania (Italy) Anastasia Grymalska (Netherlands) Cindy Burger (Montenegro) Danka Kovinić
May 27, 2013	Changwon, South Korea; Hard $25,000; Singles and doubles draws	(Japan) Risa Ozaki; 6–4, 6–4	(China) Zhang Yuxuan	(China) Han Xinyun (Japan) Nao Hibino	(China) Duan Yingying (South Korea) Yoo Mi (China) Sun Shengnan (South Korea) Yu Min-hwa
May 27, 2013	Changwon, South Korea; Hard $25,000; Singles and doubles draws	(Chinese Taipei) Chan Chin-wei (China) Liu Chang; 6–0, 6–2	(South Korea) Han Sung-hee (South Korea) Kim Ju-eun	(China) Han Xinyun (Japan) Nao Hibino	(China) Duan Yingying (South Korea) Yoo Mi (China) Sun Shengnan (South Korea) Yu Min-hwa
May 27, 2013	El Paso, United States; Hard $25,000; Singles and doubles draws	(United States) Sanaz Marand; 6–4, 6–4	(Japan) Naomi Osaka	(United States) Chieh-Yu Hsu (United States) Sachia Vickery	(Croatia) Jelena Pandžić (Canada) Heidi El Tabakh (Venezuela) Adriana Pérez (Slovenia) Petra Rampre
May 27, 2013	El Paso, United States; Hard $25,000; Singles and doubles draws	(Venezuela) Adriana Pérez (Mexico) Marcela Zacarías; 6–3, 6–3	(Oman) Fatma Al-Nabhani (United States) Keri Wong	(United States) Chieh-Yu Hsu (United States) Sachia Vickery	(Croatia) Jelena Pandžić (Canada) Heidi El Tabakh (Venezuela) Adriana Pérez (Slovenia) Petra Rampre
May 27, 2013	Sharm el-Sheikh, Egypt; Hard $10,000; Singles and doubles draws	(Kazakhstan) Kamila Kerimbayeva; 6–2, 6–4	(Ukraine) Vladyslava Zanosiyenko	(Poland) Sylwia Zagórska (Romania) Jaqueline Adina Cristian	(Serbia) Barbara Bonić (Russia) Alina Mikheeva (Ukraine) Anastasia Kharchenko (Switzerland) Sandy Marti
May 27, 2013	Sharm el-Sheikh, Egypt; Hard $10,000; Singles and doubles draws	(Ukraine) Veronika Stotyka (Ukraine) Vladyslava Zanosiyenko; 6–3, 6–4	(Ukraine) Anastasia Kharchenko (United States) Nicole Melichar	(Poland) Sylwia Zagórska (Romania) Jaqueline Adina Cristian	(Serbia) Barbara Bonić (Russia) Alina Mikheeva (Ukraine) Anastasia Kharchenko (Switzerland) Sandy Marti
May 27, 2013	Ra'anana, Israel; Hard $10,000; Singles and doubles draws	(Israel) Deniz Khazaniuk; 6–1, 6–1	(Israel) Ester Masuri	(Sweden) Rebecca Peterson (Israel) Ekaterina Tour	(Israel) Saray Sterenbach (Germany) Michaela Frlicka (Sweden) Matilda Hamlin (Sweden) Malin Ulvefeldt
May 27, 2013	Ra'anana, Israel; Hard $10,000; Singles and doubles draws	(Israel) Lee Or (Sweden) Rebecca Peterson; 6–1, 6–2	(Israel) Saray Sterenbach (Israel) Ekaterina Tour	(Sweden) Rebecca Peterson (Israel) Ekaterina Tour	(Israel) Saray Sterenbach (Germany) Michaela Frlicka (Sweden) Matilda Hamlin (Sweden) Malin Ulvefeldt
May 27, 2013	Quintana Roo, Mexico; Hard $10,000; Singles and doubles draws	(Paraguay) Montserrat González; 4–6, 7–6^{(7–4)}, 7–6^{(7–1)}	(Mexico) Ana Sofía Sánchez	(Dominican Republic) Francesca Segarelli (Argentina) Victoria Bosio	(United States) Danielle Mills (Australia) Julia Moriarty (United States) Stephanie Kent (United States) Raquel Pedraza
May 27, 2013	Quintana Roo, Mexico; Hard $10,000; Singles and doubles draws	(United States) Danielle Mills (Dominican Republic) Francesca Segarelli; 6–2, 6–4	(Mexico) Ana Sofía Sánchez (Guatemala) Daniela Schippers	(Dominican Republic) Francesca Segarelli (Argentina) Victoria Bosio	(United States) Danielle Mills (Australia) Julia Moriarty (United States) Stephanie Kent (United States) Raquel Pedraza
May 27, 2013	Cantanhede, Portugal; Carpet $10,000; Singles and doubles draws	(Portugal) Bárbara Luz; 6–3, 2–6, 7–5	(Italy) Alice Balducci	(Poland) Zuzanna Maciejewska (Spain) Nuria Párrizas Díaz	(Argentina) Carolina Zeballos (France) Amandine Cazeaux (Russia) Ekaterina Ivanova (Mexico) Ximena Hermoso
May 27, 2013	Cantanhede, Portugal; Carpet $10,000; Singles and doubles draws	(Poland) Agata Barańska (Poland) Zuzanna Maciejewska; 6–7^{(4–7)}, 6–4, [12–10]	(Argentina) Aranza Salut (Argentina) Carolina Zeballos	(Poland) Zuzanna Maciejewska (Spain) Nuria Párrizas Díaz	(Argentina) Carolina Zeballos (France) Amandine Cazeaux (Russia) Ekaterina Ivanova (Mexico) Ximena Hermoso
May 27, 2013	Adana, Turkey; Hard $10,000; Singles and doubles draws	(Slovakia) Zuzana Zlochová; 7–5, 6–0	(Bulgaria) Isabella Shinikova	(Ukraine) Olga Ianchuk (Czech Republic) Martina Borecká	(Russia) Maya Gaverova (Bulgaria) Julia Stamatova (Russia) Yana Sizikova (Turkey) Melis Bayraktaroğlu
May 27, 2013	Adana, Turkey; Hard $10,000; Singles and doubles draws	(Ukraine) Olga Ianchuk (Slovakia) Zuzana Zlochová; 6–2, 7–5	(Turkey) Sultan Gönen (Bulgaria) Julia Stamatova	(Ukraine) Olga Ianchuk (Czech Republic) Martina Borecká	(Russia) Maya Gaverova (Bulgaria) Julia Stamatova (Russia) Yana Sizikova (Turkey) Melis Bayraktaroğlu
May 27, 2013	Hilton Head Island, United States; Hard $10,000; Singles and doubles draws	(Russia) Yana Koroleva; 7–5, 6–4	(United States) Hayley Carter	(Japan) Hiroko Kuwata (South Africa) Michelle Sammons	(France) Nelly Ciolkowski (United States) Brooke Austin (United States) Katerina Stewart (United States) Alexis King
May 27, 2013	Hilton Head Island, United States; Hard $10,000; Singles and doubles draws	(United States) Kristy Frilling (United States) Alexandra Mueller; 6–3, 6–4	(United States) Hayley Carter (United States) Josie Kuhlman	(Japan) Hiroko Kuwata (South Africa) Michelle Sammons	(France) Nelly Ciolkowski (United States) Brooke Austin (United States) Katerina Stewart (United States) Alexis King
May 27, 2013	Qarshi, Uzbekistan; Hard $10,000; Singles and doubles draws	(Uzbekistan) Sabina Sharipova; 6–2, 6–3	(China) Yang Yi	(Russia) Ekaterina Yashina (Uzbekistan) Vlada Ekshibarova	(Ukraine) Valeriya Strakhova (Russia) Anastasia Frolova (Russia) Angelina Gabueva (India) Sharmada Balu
May 27, 2013	Qarshi, Uzbekistan; Hard $10,000; Singles and doubles draws	(Uzbekistan) Albina Khabibulina (Ukraine) Alyona Sotnikova; 6–3, 7–5	(Uzbekistan) Sabina Sharipova (Russia) Ekaterina Yashina	(Russia) Ekaterina Yashina (Uzbekistan) Vlada Ekshibarova	(Ukraine) Valeriya Strakhova (Russia) Anastasia Frolova (Russia) Angelina Gabueva (India) Sharmada Balu

=== June ===
Week of	Tournament	Winner	Runners-up	Semifinalists	Quarterfinalists
June 3, 2013	Open Féminin de Marseille; Marseille, France; Clay $100,000; Singles – Doubles	(Germany) Andrea Petkovic; 6–4, 6–2	(Spain) Anabel Medina Garrigues	(Slovenia) Polona Hercog (Puerto Rico) Monica Puig	(Netherlands) Arantxa Rus (Romania) Alexandra Cadanțu (France) Claire Feuerstein (Argentina) Paula Ormaechea
June 3, 2013	Open Féminin de Marseille; Marseille, France; Clay $100,000; Singles – Doubles	(Austria) Sandra Klemenschits (Slovenia) Andreja Klepač; 1–6, 6–4, [10–5]	(United States) Asia Muhammad (United States) Allie Will	(Slovenia) Polona Hercog (Puerto Rico) Monica Puig	(Netherlands) Arantxa Rus (Romania) Alexandra Cadanțu (France) Claire Feuerstein (Argentina) Paula Ormaechea
June 3, 2013	Aegon Trophy; Nottingham, United Kingdom; Grass $75,000; Singles – Doubles	(Croatia) Petra Martić; 6–3, 6–3	(Czech Republic) Karolína Plíšková	(United Kingdom) Johanna Konta (Canada) Sharon Fichman	(United States) Alison Riske (Greece) Eleni Daniilidou (United States) Irina Falconi (Hungary) Melinda Czink
June 3, 2013	Aegon Trophy; Nottingham, United Kingdom; Grass $75,000; Singles – Doubles	(United States) Maria Sanchez (United Kingdom) Nicola Slater; 4–6, 6–3, [10–8]	(Canada) Gabriela Dabrowski (Canada) Sharon Fichman	(United Kingdom) Johanna Konta (Canada) Sharon Fichman	(United States) Alison Riske (Greece) Eleni Daniilidou (United States) Irina Falconi (Hungary) Melinda Czink
June 3, 2013	Brescia, Italy; Clay $25,000; Singles and doubles draws	(Switzerland) Viktorija Golubic; 6–4, 6–4	(Italy) Anastasia Grymalska	(Georgia (country)) Sofia Shapatava (Paraguay) Verónica Cepede Royg	(Serbia) Aleksandra Krunić (Netherlands) Richèl Hogenkamp (Australia) Storm Sanders (Poland) Katarzyna Piter
June 3, 2013	Brescia, Italy; Clay $25,000; Singles and doubles draws	(Australia) Monique Adamczak (Japan) Yurika Sema; 6–4, 7–5	(Hungary) Réka-Luca Jani (Russia) Irina Khromacheva	(Georgia (country)) Sofia Shapatava (Paraguay) Verónica Cepede Royg	(Serbia) Aleksandra Krunić (Netherlands) Richèl Hogenkamp (Australia) Storm Sanders (Poland) Katarzyna Piter
June 3, 2013	Ağrı, Turkey; Carpet $25,000; Singles and doubles draws	(Belarus) Ilona Kremen; 6–4, 6–4	(Montenegro) Ana Veselinović	(Bosnia and Herzegovina) Jasmina Tinjić (Bulgaria) Isabella Shinikova	(Turkey) Çağla Büyükakçay (Poland) Justyna Jegiołka (Turkey) Başak Eraydın (Turkey) Melis Sezer
June 3, 2013	Ağrı, Turkey; Carpet $25,000; Singles and doubles draws	(Turkey) Melis Sezer (Bosnia and Herzegovina) Jasmina Tinjić; 6–4, 3–6, [10–8]	(Turkey) Çağla Büyükakçay (Turkey) Pemra Özgen	(Bosnia and Herzegovina) Jasmina Tinjić (Bulgaria) Isabella Shinikova	(Turkey) Çağla Büyükakçay (Poland) Justyna Jegiołka (Turkey) Başak Eraydın (Turkey) Melis Sezer
June 3, 2013	Las Cruces, United States; Hard $25,000; Singles and doubles draws	(Japan) Mayo Hibi; 6–3, 6–0	(Slovenia) Petra Rampre	(United States) Ashley Weinhold (United States) Elizabeth Lumpkin	(Croatia) Jelena Pandžić (Canada) Heidi El Tabakh (Venezuela) Adriana Pérez (United States) Chieh-Yu Hsu
June 3, 2013	Las Cruces, United States; Hard $25,000; Singles and doubles draws	(Bolivia) María Fernanda Álvarez Terán (United States) Keri Wong; 6–2, 6–2	(United States) Anamika Bhargava (Japan) Mayo Hibi	(United States) Ashley Weinhold (United States) Elizabeth Lumpkin	(Croatia) Jelena Pandžić (Canada) Heidi El Tabakh (Venezuela) Adriana Pérez (United States) Chieh-Yu Hsu
June 3, 2013	Qarshi, Uzbekistan; Hard $25,000; Singles and doubles draws	(Uzbekistan) Sabina Sharipova; 6–3, 6–3	(India) Ankita Raina	(China) Yang Yi (Ukraine) Veronika Kapshay	(Russia) Angelina Gabueva (Romania) Ana Bogdan (Uzbekistan) Nigina Abduraimova (Kyrgyzstan) Ksenia Palkina
June 3, 2013	Qarshi, Uzbekistan; Hard $25,000; Singles and doubles draws	(Russia) Margarita Gasparyan (Belarus) Polina Pekhova; 6–2, 6–1	(Ukraine) Veronika Kapshay (Serbia) Teodora Mirčić	(China) Yang Yi (Ukraine) Veronika Kapshay	(Russia) Angelina Gabueva (Romania) Ana Bogdan (Uzbekistan) Nigina Abduraimova (Kyrgyzstan) Ksenia Palkina
June 3, 2013	Sarajevo, Bosnia and Herzegovina; Clay $10,000; Singles and doubles draws	(Czech Republic) Tereza Malíková; 6–3, 7–5	(Czech Republic) Martina Kubičíková	(Russia) Olga Doroshina (Switzerland) Xenia Knoll	(Bulgaria) Viktoriya Tomova (Italy) Giulia Sussarello (Germany) Bianca Koch (Czech Republic) Pernilla Mendesová
June 3, 2013	Sarajevo, Bosnia and Herzegovina; Clay $10,000; Singles and doubles draws	(Romania) Ana Bianca Mihăilă (Serbia) Kristina Ostojić; 7–5, 6–4	(Romania) Elena-Teodora Cadar (Romania) Camelia Hristea	(Russia) Olga Doroshina (Switzerland) Xenia Knoll	(Bulgaria) Viktoriya Tomova (Italy) Giulia Sussarello (Germany) Bianca Koch (Czech Republic) Pernilla Mendesová
June 3, 2013	Santos, Brazil; Clay $10,000; Singles and doubles draws	(Brazil) Gabriela Cé; 7–6^{(7–2)}, 6–2	(Brazil) Ana Clara Duarte	(Brazil) Carla Forte (Brazil) Nathalia Rossi	(Portugal) Ivone Álvaro (Chile) Ivania Martinich (Brazil) Eduarda Piai (Brazil) Nathaly Kurata
June 3, 2013	Santos, Brazil; Clay $10,000; Singles and doubles draws	(Argentina) Andrea Benítez (Brazil) Carla Forte; 6–4, 6–1	(Brazil) Ana Clara Duarte (Brazil) Nathaly Kurata	(Brazil) Carla Forte (Brazil) Nathalia Rossi	(Portugal) Ivone Álvaro (Chile) Ivania Martinich (Brazil) Eduarda Piai (Brazil) Nathaly Kurata
June 3, 2013	Sharm el-Sheikh, Egypt; Hard $10,000; Singles and doubles draws	(Austria) Lisa-Maria Moser; 6–2, 6–4	(Poland) Sylwia Zagórska	(Ukraine) Vladyslava Zanosiyenko (Ukraine) Anastasia Kharchenko	(Egypt) Magy Aziz (Switzerland) Sandy Marti (India) Kyra Shroff (United Kingdom) Manisha Foster
June 3, 2013	Sharm el-Sheikh, Egypt; Hard $10,000; Singles and doubles draws	(Belarus) Lidziya Marozava (India) Kyra Shroff; 6–4, 6–2	(Russia) Alina Mikheeva (Poland) Sylwia Zagórska	(Ukraine) Vladyslava Zanosiyenko (Ukraine) Anastasia Kharchenko	(Egypt) Magy Aziz (Switzerland) Sandy Marti (India) Kyra Shroff (United Kingdom) Manisha Foster
June 3, 2013	Herzliya, Israel; Hard $10,000; Singles and doubles draws	(Israel) Deniz Khazaniuk; 6–1, 6–4	(Israel) Keren Shlomo	(Sweden) Rebecca Peterson (Israel) Ekaterina Tour	(Sweden) Malin Ulvefeldt (Sweden) Matilda Hamlin (Israel) Lee Or (Germany) Michaela Frlicka
June 3, 2013	Herzliya, Israel; Hard $10,000; Singles and doubles draws	(Israel) Lee Or (Israel) Keren Shlomo; Walkover	(Germany) Michaela Frlicka (Russia) Evgeniya Svintsova	(Sweden) Rebecca Peterson (Israel) Ekaterina Tour	(Sweden) Malin Ulvefeldt (Sweden) Matilda Hamlin (Israel) Lee Or (Germany) Michaela Frlicka
June 3, 2013	Quintana Roo, Mexico; Hard $10,000; Singles and doubles draws	(Mexico) Ana Sofía Sánchez; 6–3, 6–2	(Paraguay) Montserrat González	(Japan) Akari Inoue (Australia) Julia Moriarty	(Chile) Andrea Koch Benvenuto (Dominican Republic) Francesca Segarelli (Argentina) Victoria Bosio (France) Sherazad Benamar
June 3, 2013	Quintana Roo, Mexico; Hard $10,000; Singles and doubles draws	(Japan) Akari Inoue (Australia) Julia Moriarty; 5–7, 7–6^{(7–4)}, [12–10]	(Mexico) Ana Sofía Sánchez (Guatemala) Daniela Schippers	(Japan) Akari Inoue (Australia) Julia Moriarty	(Chile) Andrea Koch Benvenuto (Dominican Republic) Francesca Segarelli (Argentina) Victoria Bosio (France) Sherazad Benamar
June 3, 2013	Amarante, Portugal; Hard $10,000; Singles and doubles draws	(Mexico) Ximena Hermoso; 6–3, 6–2	(Spain) Nuria Párrizas Díaz	(Russia) Ekaterina Ivanova (Portugal) Bárbara Luz	(Spain) Ana Belzunce Crompin (France) Océane Adam (Spain) Olga Sáez Larra (Japan) Natsumi Chimura
June 3, 2013	Amarante, Portugal; Hard $10,000; Singles and doubles draws	(Switzerland) Tess Sugnaux (Portugal) Rita Vilaça; 7–5, 7–5	(Argentina) Aranza Salut (Argentina) Carolina Zeballos	(Russia) Ekaterina Ivanova (Portugal) Bárbara Luz	(Spain) Ana Belzunce Crompin (France) Océane Adam (Spain) Olga Sáez Larra (Japan) Natsumi Chimura
June 3, 2013	Taipei, Taiwan; Hard $10,000; Singles and doubles draws	(Chinese Taipei) Lee Ya-hsuan; 6–7^{(6–8)}, 6–2, 6–4	(Japan) Kanae Hisami	(Chinese Taipei) Chan Chin-wei (Chinese Taipei) Hsu Wen-hsin	(Chinese Taipei) Lee Hua-chen (Chinese Taipei) Chen Yi (China) Xu Shilin (Japan) Chiaki Okadaue
June 3, 2013	Taipei, Taiwan; Hard $10,000; Singles and doubles draws	(Chinese Taipei) Kao Shao-yuan (Chinese Taipei) Lee Hua-chen; 4–6, 6–3, [10–7]	(Chinese Taipei) Chan Chin-wei (Chinese Taipei) Hsu Wen-hsin	(Chinese Taipei) Chan Chin-wei (Chinese Taipei) Hsu Wen-hsin	(Chinese Taipei) Lee Hua-chen (Chinese Taipei) Chen Yi (China) Xu Shilin (Japan) Chiaki Okadaue
June 10, 2013	Aegon Nottingham Challenge; Nottingham, United Kingdom; Grass $50,000; Singles – Doubles	(United Kingdom) Elena Baltacha; 7–5, 7–6^{(9–7)}	(Slovenia) Tadeja Majerič	(Italy) Nastassja Burnett (Japan) Miki Miyamura	(Czech Republic) Barbora Záhlavová-Strýcová (United States) Madison Brengle (Canada) Stéphanie Dubois (Croatia) Petra Martić
June 10, 2013	Aegon Nottingham Challenge; Nottingham, United Kingdom; Grass $50,000; Singles – Doubles	(France) Julie Coin (France) Stéphanie Foretz Gacon; 6–2, 6–4	(Israel) Julia Glushko (Japan) Erika Sema	(Italy) Nastassja Burnett (Japan) Miki Miyamura	(Czech Republic) Barbora Záhlavová-Strýcová (United States) Madison Brengle (Canada) Stéphanie Dubois (Croatia) Petra Martić
June 10, 2013	Padua, Italy; Clay $25,000; Singles and doubles draws	(Russia) Irina Khromacheva; 6–2, 6–3	(Austria) Patricia Mayr-Achleitner	(Romania) Cristina Dinu (Slovakia) Kristína Kučová	(Italy) Anastasia Grymalska (Paraguay) Verónica Cepede Royg (Poland) Paula Kania (Czech Republic) Renata Voráčová
June 10, 2013	Padua, Italy; Clay $25,000; Singles and doubles draws	(Poland) Paula Kania (Russia) Irina Khromacheva; 6–3, 6–1	(Romania) Cristina Dinu (Slovenia) Maša Zec Peškirič	(Romania) Cristina Dinu (Slovakia) Kristína Kučová	(Italy) Anastasia Grymalska (Paraguay) Verónica Cepede Royg (Poland) Paula Kania (Czech Republic) Renata Voráčová
June 10, 2013	Bukhara, Uzbekistan; Hard $25,000; Singles and doubles draws	(Japan) Miharu Imanishi; 7–5, 7–5	(Uzbekistan) Nigina Abduraimova	(Ukraine) Valentyna Ivakhnenko (Switzerland) Amra Sadiković	(Romania) Ana Bogdan (Ukraine) Veronika Kapshay (Japan) Mari Tanaka (Belarus) Polina Pekhova
June 10, 2013	Bukhara, Uzbekistan; Hard $25,000; Singles and doubles draws	(Japan) Eri Hozumi (Japan) Makoto Ninomiya; 3–6, 7–5, [10–8]	(Russia) Angelina Gabueva (Ukraine) Veronika Kapshay	(Ukraine) Valentyna Ivakhnenko (Switzerland) Amra Sadiković	(Romania) Ana Bogdan (Ukraine) Veronika Kapshay (Japan) Mari Tanaka (Belarus) Polina Pekhova
June 10, 2013	Sharm el-Sheikh, Egypt; Hard $10,000; Singles and doubles draws	(Russia) Alina Mikheeva; 6–4, 6–4	(Austria) Lisa-Maria Moser	(Italy) Valeria Prosperi (Russia) Anna Morgina	(Austria) Pia König (Russia) Ksenia Dmitrieva (Hungary) Csilla Argyelán (Austria) Jeannine Prentner
June 10, 2013	Sharm el-Sheikh, Egypt; Hard $10,000; Singles and doubles draws	(India) Sowjanya Bavisetti (Russia) Anna Morgina; 6–1, 3–6, [10–6]	(Slovenia) Dalila Jakupovič (India) Kyra Shroff	(Italy) Valeria Prosperi (Russia) Anna Morgina	(Austria) Pia König (Russia) Ksenia Dmitrieva (Hungary) Csilla Argyelán (Austria) Jeannine Prentner
June 10, 2013	Essen, Germany; Clay $10,000; Singles and doubles draws	(Slovakia) Michaela Hončová; 6–2, 6–2	(Slovakia) Chantal Škamlová	(Switzerland) Jil Belen Teichmann (Romania) Laura-Ioana Andrei	(Brazil) Maria Fernanda Alves (Czech Republic) Martina Borecká (Germany) Carolin Daniels (France) Irina Ramialison
June 10, 2013	Essen, Germany; Clay $10,000; Singles and doubles draws	(Russia) Eugeniya Pashkova (Ukraine) Anastasiya Vasylyeva; 7–5, 6–4	(France) Irina Ramialison (France) Constance Sibille	(Switzerland) Jil Belen Teichmann (Romania) Laura-Ioana Andrei	(Brazil) Maria Fernanda Alves (Czech Republic) Martina Borecká (Germany) Carolin Daniels (France) Irina Ramialison
June 10, 2013	Quintana Roo, Mexico; Hard $10,000; Singles and doubles draws	(Mexico) Ana Sofía Sánchez; 6–1, 6–3	(Mexico) Marcela Zacarías	(Paraguay) Montserrat González (Mexico) Carolina Betancourt	(United States) Zoë Gwen Scandalis (France) Sherazad Benamar (Japan) Akari Inoue (Chile) Andrea Koch Benvenuto
June 10, 2013	Quintana Roo, Mexico; Hard $10,000; Singles and doubles draws	(United States) Macall Harkins (United States) Zoë Gwen Scandalis; 6–4, 3–6, [10–6]	(Argentina) Victoria Bosio (Paraguay) Montserrat González	(Paraguay) Montserrat González (Mexico) Carolina Betancourt	(United States) Zoë Gwen Scandalis (France) Sherazad Benamar (Japan) Akari Inoue (Chile) Andrea Koch Benvenuto
June 10, 2013	Amstelveen, Netherlands; Clay $10,000; Singles and doubles draws	(Belgium) Ysaline Bonaventure; 6–4, 6–2	(Netherlands) Cindy Burger	(United States) Bernarda Pera (Germany) Tayisiya Morderger	(Netherlands) Valeria Podda (Netherlands) Maurien Rikkert (Italy) Gaia Sanesi (Switzerland) Karin Kennel
June 10, 2013	Amstelveen, Netherlands; Clay $10,000; Singles and doubles draws	(Czech Republic) Tereza Malíková (Germany) Alina Wessel; 6–0, 6–3	(Netherlands) Valeria Podda (Netherlands) Rosalie van der Hoek	(United States) Bernarda Pera (Germany) Tayisiya Morderger	(Netherlands) Valeria Podda (Netherlands) Maurien Rikkert (Italy) Gaia Sanesi (Switzerland) Karin Kennel
June 10, 2013	Guimarães, Portugal; Hard $10,000; Singles and doubles draws	(France) Clothilde de Bernardi; 6–0, 6–2	(Mexico) Ximena Hermoso	(Spain) Ana Belzunce Crompin (Spain) Arabela Fernández Rabener	(Spain) Pilar Domínguez López (Russia) Ekaterina Ivanova (Spain) Olga Sáez Larra (Poland) Natalia Siedliska
June 10, 2013	Guimarães, Portugal; Hard $10,000; Singles and doubles draws	(Russia) Natela Dzalamidze (Spain) Arabela Fernández Rabener; 3–6, 6–3, [10–3]	(Switzerland) Tess Sugnaux (Portugal) Rita Vilaça	(Spain) Ana Belzunce Crompin (Spain) Arabela Fernández Rabener	(Spain) Pilar Domínguez López (Russia) Ekaterina Ivanova (Spain) Olga Sáez Larra (Poland) Natalia Siedliska
June 10, 2013	Gimcheon, South Korea; Hard $10,000; Singles and doubles draws	(South Korea) Lee Ye-ra; 6–7^{(3–7)}, 6–2, 6–0	(South Korea) Kim Na-ri	(China) Zhao Di (South Korea) Jang Su-jeong	(South Korea) Kim Sun-jung (South Korea) Kim Ju-eun (South Korea) Han Na-lae (South Korea) Kim So-jung
June 10, 2013	Gimcheon, South Korea; Hard $10,000; Singles and doubles draws	(South Korea) Kim Na-ri (South Korea) Lee Ye-ra; 6–3, 6–3	(South Korea) Jang Su-jeong (Japan) Riko Sawayanagi	(China) Zhao Di (South Korea) Jang Su-jeong	(South Korea) Kim Sun-jung (South Korea) Kim Ju-eun (South Korea) Han Na-lae (South Korea) Kim So-jung
June 10, 2013	Istanbul, Turkey; Hard $10,000; Singles and doubles draws	(Turkey) Başak Eraydın; 6–3, 6–4	(Belarus) Darya Lebesheva	(Turkey) Melis Sezer (Bosnia and Herzegovina) Jasmina Tinjić	(Turkey) İpek Soylu (Russia) Shakhlo Saidova (Japan) Miyabi Inoue (Bulgaria) Julia Stamatova
June 10, 2013	Istanbul, Turkey; Hard $10,000; Singles and doubles draws	(Turkey) Melis Sezer (Turkey) İpek Soylu; 6–4, retired	(Turkey) Başak Eraydın (Bosnia and Herzegovina) Jasmina Tinjić	(Turkey) Melis Sezer (Bosnia and Herzegovina) Jasmina Tinjić	(Turkey) İpek Soylu (Russia) Shakhlo Saidova (Japan) Miyabi Inoue (Bulgaria) Julia Stamatova
June 10, 2013	Bethany Beach, United States; Clay $10,000; Singles and doubles draws	(United States) Brianna Morgan; 7–6^{(7–3)}, 6–3	(Australia) Jessica Moore	(United States) Peggy Porter (United States) Brooke Austin	(Canada) Élisabeth Fournier (United States) Lena Litvak (United States) Kelsey Laurente (United States) Jacqueline Cako
June 10, 2013	Bethany Beach, United States; Clay $10,000; Singles and doubles draws	(United States) Lindsey Hardenbergh (United States) Peggy Porter; 6–1, 6–4	(United States) Denise Muresan (United States) Jacqueline Wu	(United States) Peggy Porter (United States) Brooke Austin	(Canada) Élisabeth Fournier (United States) Lena Litvak (United States) Kelsey Laurente (United States) Jacqueline Cako
June 17, 2013	Montpellier, France; Clay $25,000; Singles and doubles draws	(Croatia) Ana Konjuh; 6–3, 6–1	(Russia) Irina Khromacheva	(Bulgaria) Elitsa Kostova (France) Irina Ramialison	(Spain) Inés Ferrer Suárez (Russia) Yana Buchina (France) Alix Collombon (France) Myrtille Georges
June 17, 2013	Montpellier, France; Clay $25,000; Singles and doubles draws	(Russia) Irina Khromacheva (Czech Republic) Renata Voráčová; 6–1, 6–4	(Spain) Inés Ferrer Suárez (Brazil) Paula Cristina Gonçalves	(Bulgaria) Elitsa Kostova (France) Irina Ramialison	(Spain) Inés Ferrer Suárez (Russia) Yana Buchina (France) Alix Collombon (France) Myrtille Georges
June 17, 2013	Ystad, Sweden; Clay $25,000; Singles and doubles draws	(Montenegro) Danka Kovinić; 6–3, 6–3	(Austria) Melanie Klaffner	(Germany) Kristina Barrois (Turkey) Pemra Özgen	(Russia) Varvara Flink (Belgium) Ysaline Bonaventure (France) Alizé Lim (Belarus) Ilona Kremen
June 17, 2013	Ystad, Sweden; Clay $25,000; Singles and doubles draws	(Germany) Kristina Barrois (Lithuania) Lina Stančiūtė; 6–4, 7–5	(Australia) Monique Adamczak (Turkey) Pemra Özgen	(Germany) Kristina Barrois (Turkey) Pemra Özgen	(Russia) Varvara Flink (Belgium) Ysaline Bonaventure (France) Alizé Lim (Belarus) Ilona Kremen
June 17, 2013	Lenzerheide, Switzerland; Clay $25,000; Singles and doubles draws	(Germany) Laura Siegemund; 6–2, 6–3	(Brazil) Beatriz Haddad Maia	(Switzerland) Belinda Bencic (Australia) Storm Sanders	(Slovenia) Maša Zec Peškirič (Czech Republic) Kateřina Siniaková (Switzerland) Imane Maëlle Kocher (Georgia (country)) Sofia Shapatava
June 17, 2013	Lenzerheide, Switzerland; Clay $25,000; Singles and doubles draws	(Switzerland) Belinda Bencic (Czech Republic) Kateřina Siniaková; 6–0, 6–2	(Russia) Veronika Kudermetova (Latvia) Diāna Marcinkēviča	(Switzerland) Belinda Bencic (Australia) Storm Sanders	(Slovenia) Maša Zec Peškirič (Czech Republic) Kateřina Siniaková (Switzerland) Imane Maëlle Kocher (Georgia (country)) Sofia Shapatava
June 17, 2013	Sharm el-Sheikh, Egypt; Hard $10,000; Singles and doubles draws	(Sweden) Susanne Celik; 6–4, 6–0	(Austria) Pia König	(Slovenia) Dalila Jakupovič (India) Sowjanya Bavisetti	(Czech Republic) Barbora Štefková (Ukraine) Anna Dollar (South Africa) Madrie Le Roux (Greece) Eleni Kordolaimi
June 17, 2013	Sharm el-Sheikh, Egypt; Hard $10,000; Singles and doubles draws	(Italy) Alessia Camplone (Italy) Valeria Prosperi; 6–4, 7–5	(Egypt) Mai El Kamash (South Africa) Madrie Le Roux	(Slovenia) Dalila Jakupovič (India) Sowjanya Bavisetti	(Czech Republic) Barbora Štefková (Ukraine) Anna Dollar (South Africa) Madrie Le Roux (Greece) Eleni Kordolaimi
June 17, 2013	Cologne, Germany; Clay $10,000; Singles and doubles draws	(Germany) Antonia Lottner; 4–6, 6–4, 7–5	(Ukraine) Anastasiya Vasylyeva	(Germany) Anna Zaja (Slovakia) Karin Morgošová	(Italy) Alice Balducci (Bulgaria) Dalia Zafirova (Netherlands) Eva Wacanno (Czech Republic) Diana Šumová
June 17, 2013	Cologne, Germany; Clay $10,000; Singles and doubles draws	(Russia) Eugeniya Pashkova (Ukraine) Anastasiya Vasylyeva; 6–3, 5–7, [10–6]	(Serbia) Tamara Čurović (Germany) Antonia Lottner	(Germany) Anna Zaja (Slovakia) Karin Morgošová	(Italy) Alice Balducci (Bulgaria) Dalia Zafirova (Netherlands) Eva Wacanno (Czech Republic) Diana Šumová
June 17, 2013	Tokyo, Japan; Hard $10,000; Singles and doubles draws	(Japan) Shiho Akita; 6–4, 6–4	(Japan) Akiko Yonemura	(Japan) Emi Mutaguchi (Japan) Hiroko Kuwata	(Japan) Eri Hozumi (Japan) Nao Hibino (Japan) Chiaki Okadaue (Japan) Kumiko Iijima
June 17, 2013	Tokyo, Japan; Hard $10,000; Singles and doubles draws	(Japan) Yuka Mori (Japan) Makoto Ninomiya; 6–4, 6–3	(Japan) Kumiko Iijima (Japan) Akiko Yonemura	(Japan) Emi Mutaguchi (Japan) Hiroko Kuwata	(Japan) Eri Hozumi (Japan) Nao Hibino (Japan) Chiaki Okadaue (Japan) Kumiko Iijima
June 17, 2013	Almaty, Kazakhstan; Clay $10,000; Singles and doubles draws	(Russia) Anastasia Rudakova; 7–6^{(7–1)}, 6–4	(Kazakhstan) Yelena Nemchen	(Kazakhstan) Kamila Kerimbayeva (Russia) Tamara Bizhukova	(Russia) Viktoriya Klimushkina (Russia) Anna Koval (Belarus) Nastassia Rubel (Russia) Daria Lodikova
June 17, 2013	Almaty, Kazakhstan; Clay $10,000; Singles and doubles draws	(Russia) Margarita Lazareva (Russia) Ekaterina Yashina; 7–5, 2–6, [10–3]	(Russia) Ivanka Karamalak (Russia) Anna Koval	(Kazakhstan) Kamila Kerimbayeva (Russia) Tamara Bizhukova	(Russia) Viktoriya Klimushkina (Russia) Anna Koval (Belarus) Nastassia Rubel (Russia) Daria Lodikova
June 17, 2013	Alkmaar, Netherlands; Clay $10,000; Singles and doubles draws	(United States) Bernarda Pera; 6–1, 6–2	(Serbia) Natalija Kostić	(Netherlands) Valeria Podda (Czech Republic) Tereza Malíková	(Czech Republic) Petra Krejsová (Netherlands) Bernice van de Velde (Netherlands) Cindy Burger (Netherlands) Mandy Wagemaker
June 17, 2013	Alkmaar, Netherlands; Clay $10,000; Singles and doubles draws	(Netherlands) Kim van der Horst (Netherlands) Monique Zuur; 6–3, 7–6^{(7–5)}	(United States) Bernarda Pera (Italy) Gaia Sanesi	(Netherlands) Valeria Podda (Czech Republic) Tereza Malíková	(Czech Republic) Petra Krejsová (Netherlands) Bernice van de Velde (Netherlands) Cindy Burger (Netherlands) Mandy Wagemaker
June 17, 2013	Bucharest, Romania; Clay $10,000; Singles and doubles draws	(Romania) Irina Maria Bara; 6–4, 6–4	(Romania) Laura-Ioana Andrei	(Romania) Ioana Loredana Roșca (Belgium) Michaela Boev	(Romania) Ioana Ducu (Spain) Arabela Fernández Rabener (Romania) Elena Gabriela Ruse (Romania) Patricia Lancranjan
June 17, 2013	Bucharest, Romania; Clay $10,000; Singles and doubles draws	(Romania) Laura-Ioana Andrei (Romania) Raluca Elena Platon; 6–2, 7–6^{(7–2)}	(Romania) Raluca Ciufrilă (Romania) Andreea Ghițescu	(Romania) Ioana Loredana Roșca (Belgium) Michaela Boev	(Romania) Ioana Ducu (Spain) Arabela Fernández Rabener (Romania) Elena Gabriela Ruse (Romania) Patricia Lancranjan
June 17, 2013	Niš, Serbia; Clay $10,000; Singles and doubles draws	(Serbia) Ivana Jorović; 6–4, 4–6, 6–3	(Serbia) Doroteja Erić	(North Macedonia) Lina Gjorcheska (Bulgaria) Borislava Botusharova	(Australia) Viktorija Rajicic (Bosnia and Herzegovina) Katarina Jokić (Bulgaria) Vivian Zlatanova (Argentina) Stephanie Mariel Petit
June 17, 2013	Niš, Serbia; Clay $10,000; Singles and doubles draws	(Australia) Viktorija Rajicic (Bulgaria) Viktoriya Tomova; 6–1, 6–2	(Bosnia and Herzegovina) Nerma Ćaluk (Slovenia) Tjaša Šrimpf	(North Macedonia) Lina Gjorcheska (Bulgaria) Borislava Botusharova	(Australia) Viktorija Rajicic (Bosnia and Herzegovina) Katarina Jokić (Bulgaria) Vivian Zlatanova (Argentina) Stephanie Mariel Petit
June 17, 2013	Gimcheon, South Korea; Hard $10,000; Singles and doubles draws	(South Korea) Lee Ye-ra; 6–2, 2–6, 6–4	(South Korea) Yoo Mi	(South Korea) Kang Seo-kyung (South Korea) Hong Seung-yeon	(China) Zhao Di (South Korea) Kim Na-ri (South Korea) Jang Su-jeong (Japan) Haruka Kaji
June 17, 2013	Gimcheon, South Korea; Hard $10,000; Singles and doubles draws	(South Korea) Kang Seo-kyung (South Korea) Kim Ji-young; 7–5, 6–1	(South Korea) Jang Su-jeong (Japan) Riko Sawayanagi	(South Korea) Kang Seo-kyung (South Korea) Hong Seung-yeon	(China) Zhao Di (South Korea) Kim Na-ri (South Korea) Jang Su-jeong (Japan) Haruka Kaji
June 17, 2013	Istanbul, Turkey; Hard $10,000; Singles and doubles draws	(Belarus) Darya Lebesheva; 7–6^{(7–1)}, 6–4	(Japan) Miyabi Inoue	(Serbia) Dunja Stamenković (Belarus) Lidziya Marozava	(Bosnia and Herzegovina) Anita Husarić (Australia) Abbie Myers (Germany) Christina Shakovets (Russia) Polina Leykina
June 17, 2013	Istanbul, Turkey; Hard $10,000; Singles and doubles draws	(Germany) Christina Shakovets (Bulgaria) Julia Stamatova; 6–2, 6–0	(Russia) Polina Leykina (Belarus) Lidziya Marozava	(Serbia) Dunja Stamenković (Belarus) Lidziya Marozava	(Bosnia and Herzegovina) Anita Husarić (Australia) Abbie Myers (Germany) Christina Shakovets (Russia) Polina Leykina
June 17, 2013	Buffalo, United States; Clay $10,000; Singles and doubles draws	(United States) Alexandra Mueller; 7–5, 6–4	(Russia) Alisa Kleybanova	(Japan) Sachie Ishizu (France) Sherazad Benamar	(Canada) Sonja Molnar (Canada) Jillian O'Neill (United States) Caitlin Whoriskey (Australia) Jessica Moore
June 17, 2013	Buffalo, United States; Clay $10,000; Singles and doubles draws	(United States) Emily Harman (United States) Alexandra Mueller; 4–6, 6–3, [10–7]	(Japan) Sachie Ishizu (United States) Denise Starr	(Japan) Sachie Ishizu (France) Sherazad Benamar	(Canada) Sonja Molnar (Canada) Jillian O'Neill (United States) Caitlin Whoriskey (Australia) Jessica Moore
June 24, 2013	Huzhu, China; Clay $25,000; Singles and doubles draws	(Serbia) Barbara Bonić; 6–2, 6–4	(Chinese Taipei) Chan Chin-wei	(China) Zhao Xiao (China) Xu Yifan	(China) Zhou Yimiao (China) Guo Lu (China) Liu Fangzhou (China) Wang Xiyao
June 24, 2013	Huzhu, China; Clay $25,000; Singles and doubles draws	(Chinese Taipei) Chan Chin-wei (China) Sun Shengnan; 6–4, 6–3	(China) Liu Chang (China) Zhou Yimiao	(China) Zhao Xiao (China) Xu Yifan	(China) Zhou Yimiao (China) Guo Lu (China) Liu Fangzhou (China) Wang Xiyao
June 24, 2013	Smart Card Open Monet+ Zlín, Czech Republic; Clay $25,000; Singles and doubles draws	(Austria) Melanie Klaffner; 6–3, 6–2	(Slovakia) Kristína Kučová	(Poland) Katarzyna Kawa (Poland) Katarzyna Piter	(Hungary) Réka-Luca Jani (Czech Republic) Denisa Allertová (Germany) Anna Zaja (Poland) Paula Kania
June 24, 2013	Smart Card Open Monet+ Zlín, Czech Republic; Clay $25,000; Singles and doubles draws	(Czech Republic) Martina Borecká (Czech Republic) Tereza Smitková; 6–1, 5–7, [10–8]	(Poland) Paula Kania (Poland) Katarzyna Piter	(Poland) Katarzyna Kawa (Poland) Katarzyna Piter	(Hungary) Réka-Luca Jani (Czech Republic) Denisa Allertová (Germany) Anna Zaja (Poland) Paula Kania
June 24, 2013	Périgueux, France; Clay $25,000; Singles and doubles draws	(Brazil) Teliana Pereira; 6–1, 6–4	(Chile) Daniela Seguel	(Belarus) Aliaksandra Sasnovich (Italy) Alberta Brianti	(Brazil) Paula Cristina Gonçalves (France) Laëtitia Sarrazin (Georgia (country)) Margalita Chakhnashvili (Argentina) Tatiana Búa
June 24, 2013	Périgueux, France; Clay $25,000; Singles and doubles draws	(Slovakia) Michaela Hončová (France) Laura Thorpe; 7–6^{(7–3)}, 6–1	(Netherlands) Anna Katalina Alzate Esmurzaeva (Bulgaria) Dia Evtimova	(Belarus) Aliaksandra Sasnovich (Italy) Alberta Brianti	(Brazil) Paula Cristina Gonçalves (France) Laëtitia Sarrazin (Georgia (country)) Margalita Chakhnashvili (Argentina) Tatiana Búa
June 24, 2013	Stuttgart-Vaihingen, Germany; Clay $25,000; Singles and doubles draws	(Germany) Laura Siegemund; 6–3, 3–6, 7–6^{(7–4)}	(Switzerland) Viktorija Golubic	(Slovakia) Karin Morgošová (Germany) Antonia Lottner	(Poland) Sandra Zaniewska (Brazil) Beatriz Haddad Maia (France) Myrtille Georges (Georgia (country)) Sofia Shapatava
June 24, 2013	Stuttgart-Vaihingen, Germany; Clay $25,000; Singles and doubles draws	(Germany) Kristina Barrois (Germany) Laura Siegemund; 7–6^{(7–1)}, 6–4	(Liechtenstein) Stephanie Vogt (Poland) Sandra Zaniewska	(Slovakia) Karin Morgošová (Germany) Antonia Lottner	(Poland) Sandra Zaniewska (Brazil) Beatriz Haddad Maia (France) Myrtille Georges (Georgia (country)) Sofia Shapatava
June 24, 2013	Kristinehamn, Sweden; Clay $25,000; Singles and doubles draws	(Montenegro) Danka Kovinić; 6–1, 7–5	(Bosnia and Herzegovina) Jasmina Tinjić	(Russia) Marina Melnikova (Serbia) Jovana Jakšić	(Sweden) Rebecca Peterson (Ukraine) Tetyana Arefyeva (Russia) Mayya Katsitadze (France) Alizé Lim
June 24, 2013	Kristinehamn, Sweden; Clay $25,000; Singles and doubles draws	(Kazakhstan) Anna Danilina (Russia) Olga Doroshina; 7–5, 6–3	(United States) Julia Cohen (France) Alizé Lim	(Russia) Marina Melnikova (Serbia) Jovana Jakšić	(Sweden) Rebecca Peterson (Ukraine) Tetyana Arefyeva (Russia) Mayya Katsitadze (France) Alizé Lim
June 24, 2013	Sharm el-Sheikh, Egypt; Hard $10,000; Singles and doubles draws	(Greece) Despoina Vogasari; 6–4, 6–4	(South Africa) Madrie Le Roux	(Russia) Julia Valetova (Russia) Liudmila Vasilyeva	(Italy) Giorgia Pinto (France) Pauline Payet (Sweden) Susanne Celik (Italy) Valeria Prosperi
June 24, 2013	Sharm el-Sheikh, Egypt; Hard $10,000; Singles and doubles draws	(Egypt) Mai El Kamash (South Africa) Madrie Le Roux; 6–2, 2–6, [10–1]	(Russia) Polina Monova (Russia) Julia Valetova	(Russia) Julia Valetova (Russia) Liudmila Vasilyeva	(Italy) Giorgia Pinto (France) Pauline Payet (Sweden) Susanne Celik (Italy) Valeria Prosperi
June 24, 2013	New Delhi, India; Hard $10,000; Singles and doubles draws	(India) Ankita Raina; 6–3, 6–2	(India) Eetee Maheta	(India) Natasha Palha (India) Shweta Rana	(India) Shreya Pasricha (India) Ambika Pande (India) Rishika Sunkara (India) Prarthana Thombare
June 24, 2013	New Delhi, India; Hard $10,000; Singles and doubles draws	(India) Rishika Sunkara (Hungary) Naomi Totka; 6–4, 4–6, [13–11]	(India) Natasha Palha (India) Prarthana Thombare	(India) Natasha Palha (India) Shweta Rana	(India) Shreya Pasricha (India) Ambika Pande (India) Rishika Sunkara (India) Prarthana Thombare
June 24, 2013	Rome, Italy; Clay $10,000; Singles and doubles draws	(Italy) Martina Caregaro; 6–2, 6–3	(Italy) Jasmine Paolini	(Italy) Giulia Sussarello (Armenia) Ani Amiraghyan	(Russia) Marina Shamayko (Switzerland) Tess Sugnaux (Oman) Fatma Al-Nabhani (Italy) Carolina Pillot
June 24, 2013	Rome, Italy; Clay $10,000; Singles and doubles draws	(Italy) Martina Di Giuseppe (Romania) Bianca Hîncu; 6–1, 6–3	(Italy) Claudia Giovine (Italy) Jasmine Paolini	(Italy) Giulia Sussarello (Armenia) Ani Amiraghyan	(Russia) Marina Shamayko (Switzerland) Tess Sugnaux (Oman) Fatma Al-Nabhani (Italy) Carolina Pillot
June 24, 2013	Shymkent, Kazakhstan; Clay $10,000; Singles and doubles draws	(Russia) Margarita Lazareva; 5–7, 6–4, 6–2	(Russia) Daria Lodikova	(Russia) Anna Grigoryan (Russia) Tamara Bizhukova	(Russia) Anna Koval (Kazakhstan) Kamila Kerimbayeva (Russia) Anastasia Rudakova (Uzbekistan) Polina Merenkova
June 24, 2013	Shymkent, Kazakhstan; Clay $10,000; Singles and doubles draws	(Russia) Veronika Kudermetova (Russia) Margarita Lazareva; 6–4, 6–2	(Kazakhstan) Yekaterina Gubanova (Russia) Daria Lodikova	(Russia) Anna Grigoryan (Russia) Tamara Bizhukova	(Russia) Anna Koval (Kazakhstan) Kamila Kerimbayeva (Russia) Anastasia Rudakova (Uzbekistan) Polina Merenkova
June 24, 2013	Breda, Netherlands; Clay $10,000; Singles and doubles draws	(United States) Bernarda Pera; 6–4, 4–6, 6–0	(Bulgaria) Isabella Shinikova	(Ukraine) Anastasiya Vasylyeva (Germany) Vivian Heisen	(Netherlands) Kelly Versteeg (Czech Republic) Petra Krejsová (Belarus) Sviatlana Pirazhenka (Netherlands) Lisanne van Riet
June 24, 2013	Breda, Netherlands; Clay $10,000; Singles and doubles draws	(Colombia) María Fernanda Herazo (Colombia) María Paulina Pérez; 1–6, 7–6^{(7–2)}, [12–10]	(Belgium) Elke Lemmens (Belarus) Sviatlana Pirazhenka	(Ukraine) Anastasiya Vasylyeva (Germany) Vivian Heisen	(Netherlands) Kelly Versteeg (Czech Republic) Petra Krejsová (Belarus) Sviatlana Pirazhenka (Netherlands) Lisanne van Riet
June 24, 2013	Balș, Romania; Clay $10,000; Singles and doubles draws	(Romania) Laura-Ioana Andrei; 6–7^{(3–7)}, 7–6^{(7–4)}, 7–6^{(7–3)}	(Moldova) Anastasia Vdovenco	(Romania) Elena-Teodora Cadar (Romania) Raluca Elena Platon	(Romania) Nicoleta-Cătălina Dascălu (Belgium) Michaela Boev (Romania) Gabriela Talabă (Romania) Camelia Hristea
June 24, 2013	Balș, Romania; Clay $10,000; Singles and doubles draws	(Romania) Jaqueline Adina Cristian (Romania) Raluca Elena Platon; 7–6^{(7–4)}, 6–4	(Romania) Oana Georgeta Simion (Romania) Gabriela Talabă	(Romania) Elena-Teodora Cadar (Romania) Raluca Elena Platon	(Romania) Nicoleta-Cătălina Dascălu (Belgium) Michaela Boev (Romania) Gabriela Talabă (Romania) Camelia Hristea
June 24, 2013	Prokuplje, Serbia; Clay $10,000; Singles and doubles draws	(Serbia) Marina Kachar; 6–4, 6–3	(Croatia) Ema Mikulčić	(Australia) Viktorija Rajicic (Bulgaria) Viktoriya Tomova	(Germany) Dejana Raickovic (Slovakia) Chantal Škamlová (Serbia) Milana Špremo (Turkey) Hülya Esen
June 24, 2013	Prokuplje, Serbia; Clay $10,000; Singles and doubles draws	(Australia) Viktorija Rajicic (Bulgaria) Viktoriya Tomova; 6–2, 7–5	(Croatia) Ema Mikulčić (Germany) Dejana Raickovic	(Australia) Viktorija Rajicic (Bulgaria) Viktoriya Tomova	(Germany) Dejana Raickovic (Slovakia) Chantal Škamlová (Serbia) Milana Špremo (Turkey) Hülya Esen
June 24, 2013	Gimcheon, South Korea; Hard $10,000; Singles and doubles draws	(China) Zhao Di; 4–6, 6–2, 6–3	(Hong Kong) Zhang Ling	(South Korea) Jang Su-jeong (South Korea) Lee Ye-ra	(Japan) Riko Sawayanagi (South Korea) Yoo Mi (South Korea) Kang Seo-kyung (China) Yang Zi
June 24, 2013	Gimcheon, South Korea; Hard $10,000; Singles and doubles draws	(South Korea) Han Na-lae (South Korea) Yoo Mi; 6–3, 6–3	(South Korea) Kim Yun-hee (South Korea) Yoo Jin	(South Korea) Jang Su-jeong (South Korea) Lee Ye-ra	(Japan) Riko Sawayanagi (South Korea) Yoo Mi (South Korea) Kang Seo-kyung (China) Yang Zi
June 24, 2013	Melilla, Spain; Hard $10,000; Singles and doubles draws	(France) Clothilde de Bernardi; 7–5, 6–4	(Spain) Lucía Cervera Vázquez	(Spain) Nuria Párrizas Díaz (Spain) Ainhoa Atucha Gómez	(Spain) Pilar Domínguez López (Egypt) Mayar Sherif (Romania) Diana Stomlega (Germany) Alina Wessel
June 24, 2013	Melilla, Spain; Hard $10,000; Singles and doubles draws	(Spain) Lucía Cervera Vázquez (Spain) Pilar Domínguez López; 6–3, 6–4	(Hungary) Vanda Lukács (Egypt) Mayar Sherif	(Spain) Nuria Párrizas Díaz (Spain) Ainhoa Atucha Gómez	(Spain) Pilar Domínguez López (Egypt) Mayar Sherif (Romania) Diana Stomlega (Germany) Alina Wessel
June 24, 2013	Bangkok, Thailand; Hard $10,000; Singles and doubles draws	(Thailand) Peangtarn Plipuech; 6–0, 6–1	(Thailand) Nungnadda Wannasuk	(Indonesia) Ayu Fani Damayanti (China) Lu Jiajing	(Thailand) Apichaya Runglerdkriangkrai (Japan) Shiho Akita (Indonesia) Lavinia Tananta (Chinese Taipei) Lee Pei-chi
June 24, 2013	Bangkok, Thailand; Hard $10,000; Singles and doubles draws	(Indonesia) Ayu Fani Damayanti (Indonesia) Lavinia Tananta; 1–6, 6–4, [10–6]	(Japan) Shiho Akita (Japan) Akari Inoue	(Indonesia) Ayu Fani Damayanti (China) Lu Jiajing	(Thailand) Apichaya Runglerdkriangkrai (Japan) Shiho Akita (Indonesia) Lavinia Tananta (Chinese Taipei) Lee Pei-chi
June 24, 2013	Istanbul, Turkey; Hard $10,000; Singles and doubles draws	(Japan) Miyabi Inoue; 6–3, 6–4	(Greece) Agni Stefanou	(Belarus) Lidziya Marozava (France) Caroline Roméo	(Sweden) Anette Munozova (Australia) Abbie Myers (Australia) Nicole Hoynaski (Russia) Polina Leykina
June 24, 2013	Istanbul, Turkey; Hard $10,000; Singles and doubles draws	(Japan) Mana Ayukawa (Japan) Tomoko Dokei; 6–4, 7–6^{(8–6)}	(Australia) Nicole Hoynaski (Australia) Abbie Myers	(Belarus) Lidziya Marozava (France) Caroline Roméo	(Sweden) Anette Munozova (Australia) Abbie Myers (Australia) Nicole Hoynaski (Russia) Polina Leykina

== See also ==
- 2013 WTA Tour
- 2013 WTA 125K series
- 2013 ATP World Tour
- 2013 ATP Challenger Tour
- 2013 ITF Women's Circuit
- 2013 ITF Men's Circuit
- Women's Tennis Association
- International Tennis Federation
