= 2013 Fukuoka International Women's Cup – Doubles =

Doubles
- 2013 Fukuoka International Women's Cup

Final
- Champions: (Japan) Junri Namigata (Japan) Erika Sema
- Runners-up: (Japan) Rika Fujiwara (Japan) Akiko Omae
- Score: 7–5, 3–6, [10–7]

Events
Singles	Doubles
← 2012 ·	Fukuoka International Women's Cup	· 2014 →

Monique Adamczak and Stephanie Bengson were the defending champions, having won the event in 2012, but both players chose not to defend their titles the year after.

Junri Namigata and Erika Sema won the all-Japanese final, defeating Rika Fujiwara and Akiko Omae 7–5, 3–6, [10–7].

== Seeds ==
1. (Japan) Miki Miyamura / (Thailand) Varatchaya Wongteanchai (quarterfinals)
2. (Russia) Ksenia Lykina / (Japan) Yurika Sema (first round)
3. (Japan) Rika Fujiwara / (Japan) Akiko Omae (final)
4. (Uzbekistan) Nigina Abduraimova / (China) Sun Shengnan (first round)

== Draw ==
=== Key ===
- Q = Qualifier
- WC = Wild card
- LL = Lucky loser
- Alt = Alternate
- SE = Special exempt
- PR = Protected ranking
- ITF = ITF entry
- JE = Junior exempt
- w/o = Walkover
- r = Retired
- d = Defaulted
- SR = Special ranking

First round
1	(Japan) M Miyamura (Thailand) V Wongteanchai	6	6
Q	(Japan) K Onishi (Japan) Y Tanaka	4	3
(Japan) J Namigata (Japan) E Sema	4	6	[10]
Q	(Japan) K Ito (Japan) A Yonemura	6	3	[8]
4	(Uzbekistan) N Abduraimova (China) S Sun	4	4
(Japan) E Hozumi (Japan) M Ninomiya	6	6
(Australia) B Bobusic (Australia) S Sanders	6	6
LL	(Japan) K Adachi (Japan) A Oishi	1	1
(Ukraine) V Kapshay (Bosnia and Herzegovina) J Tinjić	6	6
(Ukraine) O Korashvili (Switzerland) A Sadiković	3	3
(Japan) C Okadaue (Japan) M Tanaka	1	1
3	(Japan) R Fujiwara (Japan) A Omae	6	6
WC	(Japan) M Kugai (Japan) M Yoshimoto	3	1
(United States) C-y Hsu (Japan) S Ishizu	6	6
(Japan) M Eguchi (Japan) M Kato	6	6
2	(Russia) K Lykina (Japan) Y Sema	3	4

Quarterfinals
1	(Japan) M Miyamura (Thailand) V Wongteanchai	3	4
(Japan) J Namigata (Japan) E Sema	6	6
(Japan) E Hozumi (Japan) M Ninomiya	6^{5}	4
(Australia) B Bobusic (Australia) S Sanders	7^{7}	6
(Ukraine) V Kapshay (Bosnia and Herzegovina) J Tinjić
3	(Japan) R Fujiwara (Japan) A Omae	w/o
(United States) C-y Hsu (Japan) S Ishizu	7	6
(Japan) M Eguchi (Japan) M Kato	5	4

Semifinals
(Japan) J Namigata (Japan) E Sema	6	6
(Australia) B Bobusic (Australia) S Sanders	3	2
3	(Japan) R Fujiwara (Japan) A Omae	6^{4}	6	[11]
(United States) C-y Hsu (Japan) S Ishizu	7^{7}	2	[9]

Final
(Japan) J Namigata (Japan) E Sema	7	3	[10]
3	(Japan) R Fujiwara (Japan) A Omae	5	6	[7]
