= Darya Lebesheva =

Belarusian tennis player

Darya Lebesheva Дар’я Лебешава
- Full name: Darya Vyacheslavovna Lebesheva
- Country (sports): Belarus
- Born: 6 April 1995 (age 31) Moscow, Russia
- Prize money: $240,154

Singles
- Career record: 48–33
- Career titles: 2 ITF
- Highest ranking: No. 505 (26 August 2013)

Doubles
- Career record: 38–26
- Career titles: 2 ITF
- Highest ranking: No. 339 (18 March 2013)

Darya Vyacheslavovna Lebesheva (Belarusian: Дар’я Вячаславаўна Лебешава; born 6 April 1995 in Moscow) is a Belarusian tennis player.

A junior ranking No. 1 in Europe and an under-18 No. 51 in the world, Lebesheva won two singles and two doubles titles on the ITF Circuit in her career. On 26 August 2013, she reached her best singles ranking of world No. 505. On 18 March 2013, she peaked at No. 339 in the doubles rankings.

In April 2012, Lebesheva made her debut for the Belarus Fed Cup team losing her doubles match (it should be her last one).

== ITF finals ==
=== Singles (2–1) ===
Legend $10,000 tournaments	Finals by surface Hard (2–1)

Outcome	No.	Date	Tournament	Surface	Opponent	Score
Winner	1.	11 March 2013	Sharm El Sheikh, Egypt	Hard	(Netherlands) Lisanne van Riet	6–7^{(5–7)}, 6–3, 6–0
Runner-up	1.	10 June 2013	Istanbul, Turkey	Hard	(Turkey) Başak Eraydın	3–6, 4–6
Winner	2.	17 June 2013	Istanbul, Turkey	Hard	(Japan) Miyabi Inoue	7–6^{(7–1)}, 6–4

=== Doubles (2–5) ===
Legend $25,000 tournaments $10,000 tournaments	Finals by surface Hard (2–3) Clay (0–2)

Outcome	No.	Date	Tournament	Surface	Partner	Opponents	Score
Runner-up	1.	13 February 2012	Tallinn, Estonia	Hard (i)	(Russia) Julia Valetova	(Slovakia) Lucia Butkovská (Netherlands) Eva Wacanno	4–6, 6–7^{(7–9)}
Runner-up	2.	14 May 2012	Moscow, Russia	Clay	(Russia) Julia Valetova	(Ukraine) Valentyna Ivakhnenko (Ukraine) Kateryna Kozlova	1–6, 3–6
Winner	1.	28 May 2012	Qarshi, Uzbekistan	Hard	(Russia) Ekaterina Yashina	(Uzbekistan) Albina Khabibulina (Ukraine) Anastasiya Vasylyeva	7–6^{(7–5)}, 6–2
Runner-up	3.	27 August 2012	Saint Petersburg, Russia	Clay	(Russia) Julia Valetova	(Russia) Olga Doroshina (Russia) Yuliya Kalabina	0–6, 4–6
Runner-up	4.	4 March 2013	Sharm El Sheikh, Egypt	Hard	(Russia) Alexandra Artamonova	(Romania) Ilka Csöregi (Madagascar) Zarah Razafimahatratra	3–6, 4–6
Winner	2.	13 May 2013	Antalya, Turkey	Hard	(Ukraine) Olga Ianchuk	(Japan) Nozomi Fujioka (Japan) Hirono Watanabe	3–6, 7–5, [10–8]
Runner-up	5.	16 February 2015	Sharm El Sheikh, Egypt	Hard	(Russia) Anastasia Shaulskaya	(Russia) Anna Morgina (Bulgaria) Julia Terziyska	3–6, 0–6

== Fed Cup participation ==
=== Doubles ===
Edition	Stage	Date	Location	Against	Surface	Partner	Opponents	W/L	Score
2012 Fed Cup; World Group II Play-offs	WG2 P/O	22 April 2012	Yverdon-les-Bains, Switzerland	Switzerland	Hard (i)	(Belarus) Aliaksandra Sasnovich	(Switzerland) Belinda Bencic (Switzerland) Amra Sadiković	L	7–6^{(7–5)}, 6–7^{(7–9)}, 5–7
