= 2013 Fukuoka International Women's Cup =

- Date: 6–12 May
- Edition: 13th
- Location: Fukuoka, Japan

Champions

Singles
- (Tunisia) Ons Jabeur

Doubles
- (Japan) Junri Namigata / (Japan) Erika Sema
← 2012 ·	Fukuoka International Women's Cup	· 2014 →

The 2013 Fukuoka International Women's Cup was a professional tennis tournament played on outdoor grass courts. It was the thirteenth edition of the tournament which was part of the 2013 ITF Women's Circuit, offering a total of $50,000 in prize money. It took place in Fukuoka, Japan, on 6–12 May 2013.

== WTA entrants ==
=== Seeds ===
Country	Player	Rank^{1}	Seed
CHN	Zheng Saisai	152	1
JPN	Erika Sema	175	2
AUS	Monique Adamczak	189	3
JPN	Yurika Sema	198	4
KAZ	Zarina Diyas	208	5
THA	Varatchaya Wongteanchai	218	6
RUS	Ksenia Lykina	231	7
SUI	Amra Sadiković	233	8

- ^{1} Rankings as of 29 April 2013

=== Other entrants ===
The following players received wildcards into the singles main draw:

- (Japan) Nao Hibino
- (Japan) Yumi Miyazaki
- (Japan) Riko Sawayanagi
- (Japan) Akiko Yonemura

The following players received entry from the qualifying draw:

- (Japan) Mana Ayukawa
- (Japan) Eri Hozumi
- (Japan) Akiko Omae
- (Japan) Kaori Onishi

The following players received entry by a lucky loser spot:

- (Japan) Haruka Kaji
- (Japan) Miki Miyamura

== Champions ==
=== Singles ===
- (Tunisia) Ons Jabeur def. (Belgium) An-Sophie Mestach 7–6^{(7–2)}, 6–2

=== Doubles ===
- (Japan) Junri Namigata / (Japan) Erika Sema def. (Japan) Rika Fujiwara / (Japan) Akiko Omae 7–5, 3–6, [10–7]
