= 2013 Fukuoka International Women's Cup – Singles =

Singles
- 2013 Fukuoka International Women's Cup

Final
- Champion: (Tunisia) Ons Jabeur
- Runner-up: (Belgium) An-Sophie Mestach
- Score: 7–6^{(7–2)}, 6–2

Events
Singles	Doubles
← 2012 ·	Fukuoka International Women's Cup	· 2014 →

Casey Dellacqua was the defending champion, having won the event in 2012, but decided not to defend her title the year after.

Ons Jabeur won the title, defeating An-Sophie Mestach in the final, 7–6^{(7–2)}, 6–2.

== Seeds ==
1. (China) Zheng Saisai (second round)
2. (Japan) Erika Sema (quarterfinals)
3. (Australia) Monique Adamczak (first round; retired)
4. (Japan) Yurika Sema (first round)
5. (Kazakhstan) Zarina Diyas (quarterfinals)
6. (Thailand) Varatchaya Wongteanchai (first round)
7. (Russia) Ksenia Lykina (withdrew)
8. (Switzerland) Amra Sadiković (second round)

== Main draw ==
=== Key ===
- Q = Qualifier
- WC = Wild card
- LL = Lucky loser
- Alt = Alternate
- SE = Special exempt
- PR = Protected ranking
- ITF = ITF entry
- JE = Junior exempt
- w/o = Walkover
- r = Retired
- d = Defaulted
- SR = Special ranking

=== Finals ===
Semifinals
(Japan) Junri Namigata	4	0
(Belgium) An-Sophie Mestach	6	6
(Uzbekistan) Nigina Abduraimova	4	6	2
(Tunisia) Ons Jabeur	6	2	6

Final
(Belgium) An-Sophie Mestach	6^{2}	2
(Tunisia) Ons Jabeur	7^{7}	6

=== Top half ===
First round
1	(China) S Zheng	6	4	6
(Japan) R Ozaki	4	6	3
(Australia) S Sanders	7	6
(Ukraine) V Kapshay	5	4
WC	(Japan) A Yonemura	6	1	4
(Japan) J Namigata	2	6	6
(Bosnia and Herzegovina) J Tinjić	1	3
8	(Switzerland) A Sadiković	6	6
3	(Australia) M Adamczak	0^{r}
(Japan) S Ishizu	3
(Belgium) A-S Mestach	7^{8}	6
(Japan) M Eguchi	6^{6}	0
(Croatia) A Savić	6	6
WC	(Japan) N Hibino	1	3
(United States) C-y Hsu	2	2
5	(Kazakhstan) Z Diyas	6	6

Second round
1	(China) S Zheng	4	2
(Australia) S Sanders	6	6
(Japan) J Namigata	6	6
8	(Switzerland) A Sadiković	3	1
(Japan) S Ishizu	3	6	6^{5}
(Belgium) A-S Mestach	6	1	7^{7}
(Croatia) A Savić	0	4
5	(Kazakhstan) Z Diyas	6	6

Quarterfinals
(Australia) S Sanders	4	3
(Japan) J Namigata	6	6
(Belgium) A-S Mestach	7^{7}	6
5	(Kazakhstan) Z Diyas	6^{5}	4

Semifinals
(Japan) J Namigata	4	0
(Belgium) A-S Mestach	6	6

=== Bottom half ===
First round
LL	(Japan) H Kaji	3	2
(Japan) S Aoyama	6	6
(China) S Sun	3	6	2
Q	(Japan) E Hozumi	6	1	6
Q	(Japan) A Omae	3	4
LL	(Japan) M Miyamura	6	6
(Uzbekistan) N Abduraimova	6^{11}	6	6
4	(Japan) Y Sema	7^{13}	3	4
6	(Thailand) V Wongteanchai	2	7^{7}	1
(Tunisia) O Jabeur	6	6^{5}	6
Q	(Japan) M Ayukawa	4	3
Q	(Japan) K Onishi	6	6
(Australia) B Bobusic	2	2
(Ukraine) T Arefyeva	6	6
WC	(Japan) Y Miyazaki	3	6	0
2	(Japan) E Sema	6	3	6

Second round
(Japan) S Aoyama	5	6^{3}
Q	(Japan) E Hozumi	7	7^{7}
LL	(Japan) M Miyamura	5	3
(Uzbekistan) N Abduraimova	7	6
(Tunisia) O Jabeur	6	6
Q	(Japan) K Onishi	0	0
(Ukraine) T Arefyeva	3	2
2	(Japan) E Sema	6	6

Quarterfinals
Q	(Japan) E Hozumi	1	7^{7}	4
(Uzbekistan) N Abduraimova	6	6^{5}	6
(Tunisia) O Jabeur	7^{10}	6
2	(Japan) E Sema	6^{8}	2

Semifinals
(Uzbekistan) N Abduraimova	4	6	2
(Tunisia) O Jabeur	6	2	6
