= 2016 Korea Open =

- Date: 19–25 September
- Edition: 13th
- Category: WTA International
- Draw: 32S / 16D
- Prize money: $250,000
- Surface: Hard
- Location: Seoul, South Korea
- Venue: Seoul Olympic Park Tennis Center

Champions

Singles
- (Spain) Lara Arruabarrena

Doubles
- (Belgium) Kirsten Flipkens / (Sweden) Johanna Larsson
← 2015 ·	Korea Open	· 2017 →

The 2016 Korea Open was a women's professional tennis tournament played on hard courts. It was the 13th edition of the tournament, and part of the 2016 WTA Tour. It took place in Seoul, South Korea between 19 September and 25 September 2016. Unseeded Lara Arruabarrena won the singles title.

== Finals ==
=== Singles ===
- (Spain) Lara Arruabarrena defeated (Romania) Monica Niculescu, 6–0, 2–6, 6–0

=== Doubles ===
- (Belgium) Kirsten Flipkens / (Sweden) Johanna Larsson defeated (Japan) Akiko Omae / (Thailand) Peangtarn Plipuech, 6–2, 6–3

== Points and prize money ==
=== Point distribution ===
Event	W	F	SF	QF	Round of 16	Round of 32	Q	Q3	Q2	Q1
Singles	280	180	110	60	30	1	18	14	10	1
Doubles	280	180	110	60	1	—	—	—	—	—

=== Prize money ===
Event	W	F	SF	QF	Round of 16	Round of 32	Q	Q2	Q1
Singles	$43,000	$21,400	$11,300	$5,900	$3,310	$1,925	$1,005	$730	$530
Doubles	$12,300	$6,400	$3,435	$1,820	$960	—	—	—	—
Doubles prize money per team

== Singles main-draw entrants ==
=== Seeds ===
Country	Player	Rank^{1}	Seed
ROU	Irina-Camelia Begu	23	1
SWE	Johanna Larsson	46	2
CHN	Zhang Shuai	49	3
FRA	Kristina Mladenovic	51	4
ROU	Monica Niculescu	55	5
BEL	Kirsten Flipkens	58	6
USA	Nicole Gibbs	72	7
USA	Louisa Chirico	75	8

- ^{1} Rankings are as of September 12, 2016

=== Other entrants ===
The following players received wildcards into the singles main draw:

- (South Korea) Han Na-lae
- (South Korea) Jang Su-jeong
- (South Korea) Lee So-ra

The following player received entry as a special exempt:

- (Czech Republic) Tereza Martincová

The following players received entry from the qualifying draw:

- (Japan) Eri Hozumi
- (Thailand) Luksika Kumkhum
- (Poland) Katarzyna Piter
- (Netherlands) Arantxa Rus

=== Withdrawals ===
- (Slovakia) Kristína Kučová → replaced by (Spain) Sara Sorribes Tormo
- (United States) Shelby Rogers → replaced by (Slovakia) Jana Čepelová
- (Kazakhstan) Yaroslava Shvedova → replaced by (New Zealand) Marina Erakovic

== Doubles main-draw entrants ==
=== Seeds ===
Country	Player	Country	Player	Rank^{1}	Seed
JPN	Eri Hozumi	GEO	Oksana Kalashnikova	96	1
BEL	Kirsten Flipkens	SWE	Johanna Larsson	159	2
NED	Demi Schuurs	CZE	Renata Voráčová	167	3
CZE	Lenka Kunčíková	CZE	Karolína Stuchlá	194	4

- ^{1} Rankings are as of September 12, 2016

=== Other entrants ===
The following players received wildcards into the singles main draw:

- (South Korea) Han Sung-hee / (South Korea) Kim Da-bin
- (South Korea) Hong Seung-yeon / (South Korea) Kang Seo-kyung
