= 2016 WTA Awards =

Women's tennis awards

Details

Achievements (singles)

Awards
- Player of the year: (Germany) Angelique Kerber
- Most improved player of the year: (United Kingdom) Johanna Konta
- Newcomer of the year: (Japan) Naomi Osaka
- Comeback player of the year: (Slovakia) Dominika Cibulková

The 2016 WTA Awards are a series of awards given by the Women's Tennis Association to players who have achieved something remarkable during the 2016 WTA Tour.

== The awards ==
These awards are decided by either the media, the players, the association, or the fans. Nominees were announced by the WTA's Twitter account.

Note: award winners in bold

=== Player of the Year ===
- (Czech Republic) Karolína Plíšková
- (United States) Serena Williams
- (Spain) Garbiñe Muguruza
- (Germany) **Angelique Kerber**
- (Romania) Simona Halep

=== Doubles Team of the Year ===
- (Russia) Ekaterina Makarova & (Russia) Elena Vesnina
- **(France) Caroline Garcia & (France) Kristina Mladenovic**
- (Switzerland) Martina Hingis & (India) Sania Mirza
- (United States) Bethanie Mattek-Sands & (Czech Republic) Lucie Šafářová

=== Most Improved Player of the Year ===
- (United Kingdom) **Johanna Konta**
- (Germany) Laura Siegemund
- (Puerto Rico) Monica Puig
- (Netherlands) Kiki Bertens

=== Newcomer of the Year ===
- (Latvia) Jeļena Ostapenko
- (Japan) **Naomi Osaka**
- (United States) Louisa Chirico
- (Switzerland) Viktorija Golubic

=== Comeback Player of the Year ===
- (Russia) Elena Vesnina
- (Latvia) Anastasija Sevastova
- (Slovakia) **Dominika Cibulková**
- (United States) Shelby Rogers
- (United States) Vania King

=== Karen Krantzcke Sportsmanship Award ===
- (Czech Republic) **Petra Kvitová**

=== Peachy Kellmeyer Player Service Award ===
- (Czech Republic) **Lucie Šafářová**

=== Diamond Aces ===
- (Romania) **Simona Halep**

=== Fan Favourite Player ===
- (Germany) Angelique Kerber
- (India) Sania Mirza
- (United States) Serena Williams
- (Poland) **Agnieszka Radwańska**
- (Romania) Simona Halep
- (Slovakia) Dominika Cibulková
- (Czech Republic) Karolína Plíšková
- (Spain) Garbiñe Muguruza
- (United States) Madison Keys
- (Czech Republic) Petra Kvitová
- (Belarus) Victoria Azarenka
- (Ukraine) Elina Svitolina
- (United States) Venus Williams
- (Denmark) Caroline Wozniacki
- (Russia) Elena Vesnina
- (Russia) Ekaterina Makarova
- (France) Alizé Cornet
- (Switzerland) Belinda Bencic
- (Canada) Eugenie Bouchard
- (Italy) Sara Errani
- (Serbia) Jelena Janković
- (Germany) Andrea Petkovic
- (Czech Republic) Lucie Šafářová
- (Serbia) Ana Ivanovic
- (Germany) Sabine Lisicki

=== Post of the Year ===
- (Germany) Angelique Kerber
- (Puerto Rico) **Monica Puig**
- (United States) Serena Williams
- (Slovakia) Dominika Cibulková
- (Denmark) Caroline Wozniacki

=== Selfie of the Year ===
- (United States) Serena Williams
- (Germany) **Angelique Kerber**
- (Serbia) Ana Ivanovic
- (Denmark) Caroline Wozniacki
- (Australia) Daria Gavrilova

=== #TBT (Throwback Thursday) of the Year ===
- (Denmark) **Caroline Wozniacki**
- (United States) Venus Williams
- (United States) Serena Williams
- (United Kingdom) Heather Watson
- (Spain) Garbiñe Muguruza

=== LOL of the Year ===
- (Germany) Andrea Petkovic
- (Belarus) **Victoria Azarenka**
- (United States) Serena Williams
- (United States) Bethanie Mattek-Sands
- (Japan) Naomi Osaka

=== Pet of the Year ===
- (United States) Venus Williams
- (United States) Serena Williams
- (Puerto Rico) **Monica Puig**
- (Slovakia) Dominika Cibulková
- (Denmark) Caroline Wozniacki

=== Fan Favourite WTA Video of the Year ===
- **WTA Emoji Challenge 2.0**()
- Alize Cornet WTA Frame Challenge
- WTA Cracker Challenge
- WTA Spelling Bee
- Jelena Ostapenko Selfie Challenge

=== Fan Favorite WTA Shot of the Year ===
- (Denmark) Caroline Wozniacki, 2016 Auckland Open first round (7%)
- (Poland) **Agnieszka Radwańska, 2016 BNP Paribas Open third round (62%)**()
- (Romania) Simona Halep, 2016 Rogers Cup second round (21%)
- (Belgium) Kirsten Flipkens, 2016 Korea Open first round (10%)

=== Fan Favorite WTA Match of the Year ===
- (Serbia) Jelena Jankovic vs. (Switzerland) Belinda Bencic, Dubai first round (4–6, 7–5, 6–4)
- (Poland) Agnieszka Radwańska vs. (Slovakia) Dominika Cibulková, Indian Wells second round (6–3, 3–6, 7–5)
- (Belarus) Victoria Azarenka vs. (Spain) Garbiñe Muguruza, Miami fourth round (7–6, 7–6)
- (Australia) Daria Gavrilova vs. (Romania) Simona Halep, Rome second round (6–3, 4–6, 6–3)
- (Spain) Carla Suárez Navarro vs. (Germany) Angelique Kerber, Birmingham quarterfinal (6–4, 1–6, 7–5)
- (Denmark) Caroline Wozniacki vs. (Poland) Agnieszka Radwańska, Tokyo semifinal (4–6, 7–5, 6–4)
- **(Czech Republic) Petra Kvitová vs (Germany) Angelique Kerber, Wuhan third round (6–7, 7–5, 6–4)**
- (United States) Madison Keys vs. (Czech Republic) Petra Kvitová, Beijing quarterfinal (6–3, 6–7, 7–6)
- (Russia) Svetlana Kuznetsova vs. (Poland) Agnieszka Radwańska, WTA Finals round robin (7–5, 1–6, 7–5)
- (Slovakia) Dominika Cibulková vs. (Russia) Svetlana Kuznetsova, WTA Finals semifinal (1–6, 7–6, 6–4)

=== Fan Favorite Grand Slam Match of the Year ===
- (United Kingdom) Johanna Konta vs. (Russia) Ekaterina Makarova, Australian Open fourth round (4–6, 6–4, 8–6)
- (Germany) Angelique Kerber vs. (United States) Serena Williams, Australian Open final (6–4, 3–6, 6–4)
- (Australia) Samantha Stosur vs. (Czech Republic) Lucie Šafářová, French Open third round (6–3, 6–7, 7–5)
- (Spain) Garbiñe Muguruza vs. (United States) Serena Williams, French Open final (7–5, 6–4)
- (United States) Venus Williams vs. (Russia) Daria Kasatkina, Wimbledon third round (7–5, 4–6, 10–8)
- (Russia) Svetlana Kuznetsova vs. (United States) Sloane Stephens, Wimbledon third round (6–7, 6–2, 8–6)
- **(Slovakia) Dominika Cibulková vs. (Poland) Agnieszka Radwańska, Wimbledon fourth round (6–3, 5–7, 9–7)**
- (Czech Republic) Karolína Plíšková vs. (United States) Venus Williams, US Open fourth round (4–6, 6–4, 7–6)
- (United States) Serena Williams vs. (Romania) Simona Halep, US Open quarterfinal (6–2, 4–6, 6–3)
- (Germany) Angelique Kerber vs. (Czech Republic) Karolína Plíšková, US Open final (6–3, 4–6, 6–4)

=== Best Dressed of the Year ===
- (Canada) Eugenie Bouchard, Connecticut Open
- (Belarus) Victoria Azarenka, Indian Wells
- (United States) Venus Williams, US Open
- (United States) Bethanie Mattek-Sands, Indian Wells
- (Spain) Garbiñe Muguruza, Rome
- (Germany) Angelique Kerber, US Open
- (United States) Sloane Stephens, Acapulco
- (Romania) Simona Halep, Madrid
- (United States) **Serena Williams, Wimbledon**
- (Poland) Agnieszka Radwańska, Miami
- (Serbia) Ana Ivanovic, Roland Garros
