= 2015 Korea Open =

- Date: 21–27 September
- Edition: 12th
- Category: WTA International
- Draw: 32S / 16D
- Prize money: $500,000
- Surface: Hard
- Location: Seoul, South Korea
- Venue: Seoul Olympic Park Tennis Center

Champions

Singles
- (Romania) Irina-Camelia Begu

Doubles
- (Spain) Lara Arruabarrena / (Slovenia) Andreja Klepač
| ← 2014 · | Korea Open | · 2016 → |

The 2015 Korea Open was a women's professional tennis tournament played on hard courts. It was the 12th edition of the tournament, and was part of the 2015 WTA Tour. It took place in Seoul, South Korea between 21 September and 27 September 2015. First-seeded Irina-Camelia Begu won the singles title.

== Finals ==
=== Singles ===
(Romania) Irina-Camelia Begu defeated (Belarus) Aliaksandra Sasnovich, 6–3, 6–1

- It was Begu's only singles title of the year and the 2nd of her career.

=== Doubles ===
(Spain) Lara Arruabarrena / (Slovenia) Andreja Klepač defeated (Netherlands) Kiki Bertens / (Sweden) Johanna Larsson, 2–6, 6–3, [10–6]

== Points and prize money ==
=== Point distribution ===
| Event | W | F | SF | QF | Round of 16 | Round of 32 | Q | Q3 | Q2 | Q1 |
| Singles | 280 | 180 | 110 | 60 | 30 | 1 | 18 | 14 | 10 | 1 |
| Doubles | 280 | 180 | 110 | 60 | 1 | — | — | — | — | — |

=== Prize money ===
| Event | W | F | SF | QF | Round of 16 | Round of 32^{1} | Q3 | Q2 | Q1 |
| Singles | $111,389 | $55,435 | $29,270 | $8,502 | $4,770 | $2,774 | $1,448 | $1,052 | $764 |
| Doubles | $17,724 | $9,222 | $4,950 | $2,623 | $1,383 | — | — | — | — |
Doubles prize money per team

_{^{1} Qualifiers prize money is also the Round of 32 prize money}

== Singles main-draw entrants ==
=== Seeds ===
| Country | Player | Rank^{1} | Seed |
|---|---|---|---|
| ROU | Irina-Camelia Begu | 30 | 1 |
| SVK | Anna Karolína Schmiedlová | 32 | 2 |
| USA | Sloane Stephens | 33 | 3 |
| USA | Varvara Lepchenko | 38 | 4 |
| GER | Mona Barthel | 48 | 5 |
| ROU | Alexandra Dulgheru | 51 | 6 |
| GER | Julia Görges | 54 | 7 |
| BEL | Alison Van Uytvanck | 55 | 8 |

- ^{1} Rankings are as of September 14, 2015

=== Other entrants ===
The following players received wildcards into the singles main draw:

- (Japan) Kimiko Date-Krumm
- (South Korea) Han Na-lae
- (South Korea) Jang Su-jeong

The following players received entry from the qualifying draw:

- (Spain) Paula Badosa Gibert
- (Ukraine) Kateryna Kozlova
- (United States) Nicole Melichar
- (Belarus) Aliaksandra Sasnovich

=== Withdrawals ===
Before the tournament

- (France) Alizé Cornet → replaced by (United States) Lauren Davis
- (Australia) Casey Dellacqua → replaced by (Russia) Elizaveta Kulichkova
- (Italy) Karin Knapp → replaced by (Colombia) Mariana Duque Mariño
- (United States) Bethanie Mattek-Sands → replaced by (Kazakhstan) Yaroslava Shvedova
- (Italy) Roberta Vinci → replaced by (United States) Irina Falconi

=== Retirements ===
- (Czech Republic) Klára Koukalová
- (Kazakhstan) Yaroslava Shvedova

== Doubles main-draw entrants ==
=== Seeds ===
| Country | Player | Country | Player | Rank^{1} | Seed |
|---|---|---|---|---|---|
| ESP | Lara Arruabarrena | SLO | Andreja Klepač | 69 | 1 |
| NED | Kiki Bertens | SWE | Johanna Larsson | 84 | 2 |
| ROU | Irina-Camelia Begu | ROU | Raluca Olaru | 91 | 3 |
| JPN | Kimiko Date-Krumm | CZE | Kateřina Siniaková | 174 | 4 |

- ^{1} Rankings are as of September 14, 2015

=== Other entrants ===
The following players received wildcards into the singles main draw:

- (South Korea) Choi Ji-hee / (South Korea) Lee So-ra
- (South Korea) Han Sung-hee / (South Korea) Hong Seung-yeon
