= 2023 Kurume U.S.E Cup – Doubles =

Doubles
- 2023 Kurume U.S.E Cup

Final
- Champions: (Australia) Talia Gibson (China) Wang Yafan
- Runners-up: (Japan) Funa Kozaki (Japan) Junri Namigata
- Score: 6–3, 6–3

Events
Singles	Doubles
← 2019 ·	Kurume Cup	· 2024 →

Hiroko Kuwata and Ena Shibahara were the defending champions but chose not to participate.

Talia Gibson and Wang Yafan won the title, defeating Funa Kozaki and Junri Namigata in the final, 6–3, 6–3.

== Seeds ==
1. (Japan) Erina Hayashi / (Japan) Momoko Kobori (quarterfinals)
2. (China) Ma Yexin / (Australia) Alana Parnaby (semifinals)
3. (Japan) Saki Imamura / (Japan) Kanako Morisaki (first round)
4. (Japan) Aoi Ito / (Japan) Erika Sema (semifinals)

== Draw ==
=== Key ===
- Q = Qualifier
- WC = Wild card
- LL = Lucky loser
- Alt = Alternate
- SE = Special exempt
- PR = Protected ranking
- ITF = ITF entry
- JE = Junior exempt
- w/o = Walkover
- r = Retired
- d = Defaulted
- SR = Special ranking

First round
1	(Japan) E Hayashi (Japan) M Kobori	6	6
(Japan) M Ozeki (Japan) R Ueda	2	0
(Japan) Y Hosoki (Japan) E Shimizu	6^{3}	6^{5}
(Australia) T Gibson (China) Y Wang	7^{7}	7^{7}
4	(Japan) A Ito (Japan) E Sema	6	6
WC	(Japan) A Inoue (Japan) R Kajitani	1	4
WC	(Japan) A Ryszawy (Japan) H Takeuchi	3	1
(Japan) A Omae (Japan) M Yamaguchi	6	6
(Chinese Taipei) Y-c Hsieh (Japan) N Kawaguchi	6	7
(Poland) O Lincer (Denmark) J Svendsen	0	5
(Japan) F Kozaki (Japan) J Namigata	7^{7}	6
3	(Japan) S Imamura (Japan) K Morisaki	6^{4}	3
(Japan) N Katsumi (Japan) A Shimizu	3	3
(Japan) R Saigo (Japan) Y Saigo	6	6
(Japan) N Hanatani (Japan) N Kawagishi	4	1
2	(China) Y Ma (Australia) A Parnaby	6	6

Quarterfinals
1	(Japan) E Hayashi (Japan) M Kobori	5	0
(Australia) T Gibson (China) Y Wang	7	6
4	(Japan) A Ito (Japan) E Sema	6^{5}	6	[10]
(Japan) A Omae (Japan) M Yamaguchi	7^{7}	3	[5]
(Chinese Taipei) Y-c Hsieh (Japan) N Kawaguchi	7	1	[8]
(Japan) F Kozaki (Japan) J Namigata	5	6	[10]
(Japan) R Saigo (Japan) Y Saigo
2	(China) Y Ma (Australia) A Parnaby	w/o

Semifinals
(Australia) T Gibson (China) Y Wang	6	6
4	(Japan) A Ito (Japan) E Sema	0	3
(Japan) F Kozaki (Japan) J Namigata	6	6
2	(China) Y Ma (Australia) A Parnaby	4	4

Final
(Australia) T Gibson (China) Y Wang	6	6
(Japan) F Kozaki (Japan) J Namigata	3	3
