= 2018 Kurume U.S.E Cup – Singles =

Singles
- 2018 Kurume U.S.E Cup

Final
- Champion: (Japan) Ayano Shimizu
- Runner-up: (Australia) Abbie Myers
- Score: 6–3, 7–5

Events
Singles	Doubles
← 2017 ·	Kurume Cup	· 2019 →

Laura Robson was the defending champion, but withdrew before the event started.

Ayano Shimizu won the title, defeating Abbie Myers in the final, 6–3, 7–5.

== Seeds ==
1. (United Kingdom) Naomi Broady (semifinals)
2. (Australia) Arina Rodionova (quarterfinals)
3. (United Kingdom) Katie Boulter (first round, retired)
4. (Japan) Junri Namigata (first round)
5. (United Kingdom) Katy Dunne (quarterfinals)
6. (Serbia) Ivana Jorović (second round, retired)
7. (Japan) Ayano Shimizu (champion)
8. (United States) Jacqueline Cako (first round, retired)

== Draw ==
=== Key ===
- Q = Qualifier
- WC = Wild card
- LL = Lucky loser
- Alt = Alternate
- SE = Special exempt
- PR = Protected ranking
- ITF = ITF entry
- JE = Junior exempt
- w/o = Walkover
- r = Retired
- d = Defaulted
- SR = Special ranking

=== Finals ===
Semifinals
1	(United Kingdom) Naomi Broady	5	3
Q	(Australia) Abbie Myers	7	6
(Russia) Ksenia Lykina	6^{3}	0
7	(Japan) Ayano Shimizu	7^{7}	6

Final
Q	(Australia) Abbie Myers	3	5
7	(Japan) Ayano Shimizu	6	7

=== Top half ===
First round
1	(United Kingdom) N Broady	6	6
(Japan) N Hanatani	4	2
WC	(Japan) S Oshino	7	0
(Switzerland) A Sadiković	5	0^{r}
(United Kingdom) T Moore	6	6
WC	(Japan) R Kajitani	4	1
(Japan) H Kuwata	3	6	1
5	(United Kingdom) K Dunne	6	1	6
3	(United Kingdom) K Boulter	6	4	0^{r}
(Australia) T Patterson	3	6	0
(Australia) O Tjandramulia	6	2	6
(Japan) R Ushijima	2	6	4
Q	(Australia) A Myers	5	7^{7}	7^{7}
Q	(United States) A Nefedova	7	6^{1}	6^{4}
(United States) A Muhammad	6	1
8	(United States) J Cako	2	0^{r}

Second round
1	(United Kingdom) N Broady	6	6
WC	(Japan) S Oshino	1	4
(United Kingdom) T Moore	6	2	1
5	(United Kingdom) K Dunne	2	6	6
(Australia) T Patterson	5	6	6
(Australia) O Tjandramulia	7	4	4
Q	(Australia) A Myers	6	6
(United States) A Muhammad	3	1

Quarterfinals
1	(United Kingdom) N Broady	4	6	6
5	(United Kingdom) K Dunne	6	3	2
(Australia) T Patterson	3	6	4
Q	(Australia) A Myers	6	2	6

Semifinals
1	(United Kingdom) N Broady	5	3
Q	(Australia) A Myers	7	6

=== Bottom half ===
First round
6	(Serbia) I Jorović	6	6
(Japan) C Muramatsu	3	3
(Japan) H Kaji	6	6
Q	(Japan) S Hondo	3	3
(Japan) M Eguchi	2	6	6
(Japan) M Kobori	6	3	0
(Russia) K Lykina	2	6	6
4	(Japan) J Namigata	6	2	1
7	(Japan) A Shimizu	6	6
(Japan) S Akita	2	4
(Japan) R Fujiwara	3	6	6
Q	(Japan) A Matsumoto	6	3	4
(Japan) E Hayashi	1	2
(Papua New Guinea) A Tere-Apisah	6	6
WC	(Japan) K Morisaki	0	4
2	(Australia) Ar Rodionova	6	6

Second round
6	(Serbia) I Jorović	0^{r}
(Japan) H Kaji	2
(Japan) M Eguchi	0	3
(Russia) K Lykina	6	6
7	(Japan) A Shimizu	6	2	6
(Japan) R Fujiwara	4	6	2
(Papua New Guinea) A Tere-Apisah	4	6	5
2	(Australia) Ar Rodionova	6	1	7

Quarterfinals
(Japan) H Kaji	6	3	4
(Russia) K Lykina	2	6	6
7	(Japan) A Shimizu	7	5	7
2	(Australia) Ar Rodionova	5	7	5

Semifinals
(Russia) K Lykina	6^{3}	0
7	(Japan) A Shimizu	7^{7}	6
