= 2024 Kurume U.S.E Cup – Doubles =

Doubles
- 2024 Kurume U.S.E Cup

Final
- Champions: (United Kingdom) Madeleine Brooks (United Kingdom) Sarah Beth Grey
- Runners-up: (Japan) Momoko Kobori (Japan) Ayano Shimizu
- Score: 6–4, 6–0

Events
Singles	Doubles
← 2023 ·	Kurume Cup	· 2025 →

Talia Gibson and Wang Yafan were the defending champions but chose not to participate.

Madeleine Brooks and Sarah Beth Grey won the title, defeating Momoko Kobori and Ayano Shimizu in the final, 6–4, 6–0.

== Seeds ==
1. (United Kingdom) Madeleine Brooks / (United Kingdom) Sarah Beth Grey (champions)
2. (Japan) Momoko Kobori / (Japan) Ayano Shimizu (final)
3. (Japan) Saki Imamura / (Japan) Naho Sato (semifinals)
4. (India) Rutuja Bhosale / (New Zealand) Paige Hourigan (first round)

== Draw ==
=== Key ===
- Q = Qualifier
- WC = Wild card
- LL = Lucky loser
- Alt = Alternate
- SE = Special exempt
- PR = Protected ranking
- ITF = ITF entry
- JE = Junior exempt
- w/o = Walkover
- r = Retired
- d = Defaulted
- SR = Special ranking

First round
1	(United Kingdom) M Brooks (United Kingdom) SB Grey	6	6
WC	(Japan) A Ide (Japan) Y Mizuguchi	3	3
(Australia) P Hule; P Iatcenko	6	3	[8]
(Australia) L Cabrera (United States) D Hewitt	3	6	[10]
3	(Japan) S Imamura (Japan) N Sato	6	7^{7}
(Japan) S Hosogi (Japan) M Matsuda	2	6^{2}
(Japan) A Inoue (Japan) A Omae	6	6
WC	(Japan) C Miyahara (Japan) M Miyahara	2	3
(South Korea) D-b Kim (Japan) Mi Mushika	0	2
(Japan) Y Hosoki (Japan) Y Saigo	6	6
(Australia) A Osborne (Thailand) M Sawangkaew	6	7
4	(India) R Bhosale (New Zealand) P Hourigan	1	5
(Japan) N Kawaguchi (Japan) K Morisaki	6	2	[7]
(Japan) M Aikawa (Canada) I Boulais	4	6	[10]
WC	(Japan) M Akashi (Japan) H Takeuchi	0	1
2	(Japan) M Kobori (Japan) A Shimizu	6	6

Quarterfinals
1	(United Kingdom) M Brooks (United Kingdom) SB Grey	w/o
(Australia) L Cabrera (United States) D Hewitt
3	(Japan) S Imamura (Japan) N Sato	6	6
(Japan) A Inoue (Japan) A Omae	4	3
(Japan) Y Hosoki (Japan) Y Saigo	3	6	[10]
(Australia) A Osborne (Thailand) M Sawangkaew	6	3	[7]
(Japan) M Aikawa (Canada) I Boulais	4	4
2	(Japan) M Kobori (Japan) A Shimizu	6	6

Semifinals
1	(United Kingdom) M Brooks (United Kingdom) SB Grey	6	6
3	(Japan) S Imamura (Japan) N Sato	3	2
(Japan) Y Hosoki (Japan) Y Saigo	4	3
2	(Japan) M Kobori (Japan) A Shimizu	6	6

Final
1	(United Kingdom) M Brooks (United Kingdom) SB Grey	6	6
2	(Japan) M Kobori (Japan) A Shimizu	4	0
