= 2015 Korea Open – Doubles =

Doubles
- 2015 Korea Open

Final
- Champions: (Spain) Lara Arruabarrena (Slovenia) Andreja Klepač
- Runners-up: (Netherlands) Kiki Bertens (Sweden) Johanna Larsson
- Score: 2–6, 6–3, [10–6]

Details
- Draw: 16
- Seeds: 4

Events
Singles	Doubles
← 2014 ·	Korea Open	· 2016 →

Lara Arruabarrena and Irina-Camelia Begu were the defending champions but chose not to participate together. Begu teamed up with Raluca Olaru but lost in the semifinals to Kiki Bertens and Johanna Larsson.
Arruabarrena successfully defended the title alongside Andreja Klepač, defeating Kiki Bertens and Johanna Larsson in the final, 2–6, 6–3, [10–6].

== Seeds ==
1. (Spain) Lara Arruabarrena / (Slovenia) Andreja Klepač (champions)
2. (Netherlands) Kiki Bertens / (Sweden) Johanna Larsson (final)
3. (Romania) Irina-Camelia Begu / (Romania) Raluca Olaru (semifinals)
4. (Japan) Kimiko Date-Krumm / (Czech Republic) Kateřina Siniaková (quarterfinals)

== Draw ==
=== Key ===
- Q = Qualifier
- WC = Wild card
- LL = Lucky loser
- Alt = Alternate
- SE = Special exempt
- PR = Protected ranking
- ITF = ITF entry
- JE = Junior exempt
- w/o = Walkover
- r = Retired
- d = Defaulted
- SR = Special ranking

First round
1	(Spain) L Arruabarrena (Slovenia) A Klepač	6	6
(Thailand) N Lertpitaksinchai (Thailand) P Plipuech	2	1
(Russia) K Lykina (United Kingdom) E Webley-Smith	7^{7}	6^{6}	[10]
(South Korea) N-l Han (South Korea) S-j Jang	6^{4}	7^{8}	[7]
4	(Japan) K Date-Krumm (Czech Republic) K Siniaková	7^{7}	6
(China) C Liu (China) Jia Lu	6^{4}	3
(Japan) S Aoyama (Japan) M Ninomiya	6	6
WC	(South Korea) J-h Choi (South Korea) S-r Lee	2	3
(United States) N Melichar (Romania) A Mitu	4	3
(Czech Republic) Kr Plíšková (Czech Republic) K Vaňková	6	6
WC	(South Korea) S-h Han (South Korea) S-y Hong	3	4
3	(Romania) I-C Begu (Romania) R Olaru	6	6
(Japan) M Miyamura (Japan) K Takahata	6^{2}	4
(Russia) N Dzalamidze (Russia) P Monova	7^{7}	6
(United States) I Falconi (United Kingdom) H Watson	3	0
2	(Netherlands) K Bertens (Sweden) J Larsson	6	6

Quarterfinals
1	(Spain) L Arruabarrena (Slovenia) A Klepač	4	6	[10]
(Russia) K Lykina (United Kingdom) E Webley-Smith	6	3	[3]
4	(Japan) K Date-Krumm (Czech Republic) K Siniaková	4	4
(Japan) S Aoyama (Japan) M Ninomiya	6	6
(Czech Republic) Kr Plíšková (Czech Republic) K Vaňková	2	2
3	(Romania) I-C Begu (Romania) R Olaru	6	6
(Russia) N Dzalamidze (Russia) P Monova	3	6^{2}
2	(Netherlands) K Bertens (Sweden) J Larsson	6	7^{7}

Semifinals
1	(Spain) L Arruabarrena (Slovenia) A Klepač	6	6
(Japan) S Aoyama (Japan) M Ninomiya	4	1
3	(Romania) I-C Begu (Romania) R Olaru	3	1
2	(Netherlands) K Bertens (Sweden) J Larsson	6	6

Final
1	(Spain) L Arruabarrena (Slovenia) A Klepač	2	6	[10]
2	(Netherlands) K Bertens (Sweden) J Larsson	6	3	[6]
