= 2019 Kurume U.S.E Cup =

- Date: 13–19 May 2019
- Edition: 15th
- Category: ITF Women's World Tennis Tour
- Prize money: $60,000
- Surface: Carpet
- Location: Kurume, Japan

Champions

Singles
- (Canada) Rebecca Marino

Doubles
- (Japan) Hiroko Kuwata / (United States) Ena Shibahara
← 2018 ·	Kurume Cup	· 2023 →

The 2019 Kurume U.S.E Cup was a professional tennis tournament played on outdoor carpet courts. It was the fifteenth edition of the tournament which was part of the 2019 ITF Women's World Tennis Tour. It took place in Kurume, Japan between 13 and 19 May 2019.

== Singles main-draw entrants ==
=== Seeds ===
Country	Player	Rank^{1}	Seed
GBR	Heather Watson	119	1
JPN	Ayano Shimizu	178	2
~~USA~~	~~Kristie Ahn~~	~~185~~	~~3~~
CAN	Rebecca Marino	193	4
JPN	Momoko Kobori	237	5
USA	Jamie Loeb	238	6
AUS	Kaylah McPhee	239	7
JPN	Hiroko Kuwata	242	8

- ^{1} Rankings are as of 6 May 2019.

=== Other entrants ===
The following players received wildcards into the singles main draw:

- (Japan) Sakura Hondo
- (Japan) Misaki Matsuda
- (Japan) Kanako Morisaki
- (Japan) Naho Sato

The following players received entry from the qualifying draw:

- (Japan) Haruna Arakawa
- (Japan) Mana Ayukawa
- (Japan) Ayumi Miyamoto
- (Japan) Yuki Naito
- (United States) Ena Shibahara
- (Japan) Yuuki Tanaka

The following player received entry as a lucky loser:

- (Australia) Alexandra Bozovic
- (Japan) Himeno Sakatsume

== Champions ==
=== Singles ===
- (Canada) Rebecca Marino def. (Japan) Yuki Naito, 6–4, 7–6^{(7–0)}

=== Doubles ===
- (Japan) Hiroko Kuwata / (United States) Ena Shibahara def. (Japan) Erina Hayashi / (Japan) Moyuka Uchijima, 0–6, 6–4, [10–5]
