= 2015 Korea Open – Singles =

Singles
- 2015 Korea Open

Final
- Champion: (Romania) Irina-Camelia Begu
- Runner-up: (Belarus) Aliaksandra Sasnovich
- Score: 6–3, 6–1

Details
- Draw: 32
- Seeds: 8

Events
| Singles | Doubles |
- Korea Open

Karolína Plíšková was the defending champion, but chose to compete in Tokyo instead.

Irina-Camelia Begu won the title, defeating Aliaksandra Sasnovich in the final, 6–3, 6–1. It was her second WTA Tour title.

== Seeds ==
1. (Romania) Irina-Camelia Begu (champion)
2. (Slovakia) Anna Karolína Schmiedlová (semifinals)
3. (United States) Sloane Stephens (quarterfinals)
4. (United States) Varvara Lepchenko (second round)
5. (Germany) Mona Barthel (quarterfinals)
6. (Romania) Alexandra Dulgheru (first round)
7. (Germany) Julia Görges (second round)
8. (Belgium) Alison Van Uytvanck (semifinals)

== Draw ==
Key

- Q = Qualifier
- WC = Wild card
- LL = Lucky loser
- Alt = Alternate
- ITF = ITF entry
- PR = Protected ranking
- SR = Special ranking
- SE = Special exempt
- JE = Junior exempt
- JR = Junior Accelerator Programme entrant
- CO = College Accelerator Programme entrant
- NG = Next Gen Accelerator Program entrant
- w/o = Walkover
- r = Retired
- d = Defaulted

=== Finals ===
Semifinals
1 | (Romania) Irina-Camelia Begu | 6 | 6
8 | (Belgium) Alison Van Uytvanck | 2 | 0
Q | (Belarus) Aliaksandra Sasnovich | 3 | 6 | 6
2 | (Slovakia) Anna Karolína Schmiedlová | 6 | 3 | 3

Final
1 | (Romania) Irina-Camelia Begu | 6 | 6
Q | (Belarus) Aliaksandra Sasnovich | 3 | 1

=== Top half ===
First round
1 | (Romania) I-C Begu | 6 | 6
Q | (Ukraine) K Kozlova | 2 | 4
(Slovenia) P Hercog | 6 | 6
(United States) L Davis | 1 | 3
Q | (United States) N Melichar | 4 | 2
(Sweden) J Larsson | 6 | 6
(Spain) L Arruabarrena | 1 | 4
7 | (Germany) J Görges | 6 | 6
4 | (United States) V Lepchenko | 6 | 6
Q | (Spain) P Badosa Gibert | 2 | 3
(United Kingdom) H Watson | 4 | 6 | 3
(Russia) E Kulichkova | 6 | 3 | 6
(Czech Republic) K Siniaková | 6 | 2 | 6
(United States) I Falconi | 3 | 6 | 0
(Romania) A Mitu | 6 | 1 | 6^{2}
8 | (Belgium) A Van Uytvanck | 3 | 6 | 7^{7}

Second round
1 | (Romania) I-C Begu | 6 | 6^{6} | 6
(Slovenia) P Hercog | 2 | 7^{8} | 2
(Sweden) J Larsson | 7 | 6
7 | (Germany) J Görges | 5 | 4
4 | (United States) V Lepchenko | 0 | 2
(Russia) E Kulichkova | 6 | 6
(Czech Republic) K Siniaková | 3 | 6 | 6^{3}
8 | (Belgium) A Van Uytvanck | 6 | 1 | 7^{7}

Quarterfinals
1 | (Romania) I-C Begu | 6 | 7
(Sweden) J Larsson | 4 | 5
(Russia) E Kulichkova | 1 | 6 | 2
8 | (Belgium) A Van Uytvanck | 6 | 4 | 6

Semifinals
1 | (Romania) I-C Begu | 6 | 6
8 | (Belgium) A Van Uytvanck | 2 | 0

=== Bottom half ===
First round
6 | (Romania) A Dulgheru | 2 | 3
Q | (Belarus) A Sasnovich | 6 | 6
(Czech Republic) K Koukalová | 1 | 1^{r}
(Slovakia) M Rybáriková | 6 | 2
WC | (Japan) K Date-Krumm | 6 | 6
(Croatia) A Tomljanović | 1 | 2
WC | (South Korea) N-l Han | 1 | 1
3 | (United States) S Stephens | 6 | 6
5 | (Germany) M Barthel | 6 | 7^{7}
WC | (South Korea) S-j Jang | 0 | 6^{2}
(Netherlands) K Bertens | 6 | 6^{5} | 2
(Colombia) M Duque Mariño | 3 | 7^{7} | 6
(Kazakhstan) Y Shvedova | 4 | 2^{r}
(United States) C McHale | 6 | 1
(Czech Republic) Kr Plíšková | 6 | 3 | 4
2 | (Slovakia) AK Schmiedlová | 3 | 6 | 6

Second round
Q | (Belarus) A Sasnovich | 6 | 6
(Slovakia) M Rybáriková | 3 | 3
WC | (Japan) K Date-Krumm | 3 | 4
3 | (United States) S Stephens | 6 | 6
5 | (Germany) M Barthel | 6 | 6
(Colombia) M Duque Mariño | 2 | 1
(United States) C McHale | 2 | 6 | 3
2 | (Slovakia) AK Schmiedlová | 6 | 4 | 6

Quarterfinals
Q | (Belarus) A Sasnovich | 6 | 6
3 | (United States) S Stephens | 3 | 2
5 | (Germany) M Barthel | 4 | 6 | 1
2 | (Slovakia) AK Schmiedlová | 6 | 3 | 6

Semifinals
Q | (Belarus) A Sasnovich | 3 | 6 | 6
2 | (Slovakia) AK Schmiedlová | 6 | 3 | 3

== Qualifying ==
=== Seeds ===
1. (Belarus) Aliaksandra Sasnovich (qualified)
2. (Czech Republic) Tereza Martincová (first round)
3. (Japan) Shuko Aoyama (first round)
4. (Spain) Paula Badosa Gibert (qualified)
5. (Russia) Ekaterina Bychkova (qualifying competition)
6. (China) Lu Jiajing (qualifying competition)
7. (Ukraine) Kateryna Kozlova (qualified)
8. (Czech Republic) Nicole Vaidišová (first round)

=== Qualifiers ===
1. (Belarus) Aliaksandra Sasnovich
2. (Ukraine) Kateryna Kozlova
3. (United States) Nicole Melichar
4. (Spain) Paula Badosa Gibert

=== Qualifying draw ===
==== First qualifier ====
First round
1 | (Belarus) Aliaksandra Sasnovich | 6 | 6
(Thailand) Peangtarn Plipuech | 1 | 4
WC | (South Korea) Han Sung-hee | 6^{5} | 2
WC | (South Korea) Lee Ye-ra | 7^{7} | 6
WC | (South Korea) Hong Hyun-hui | 6^{2} | 6^{7}
(Russia) Natela Dzalamidze | 7^{7} | 7^{9}
WC | (South Korea) Hong Seung-yeon | 6 | 3 | 2
6 | (China) Lu Jiajing | 2 | 6 | 6

Second round
1 | (Belarus) Aliaksandra Sasnovich | 6 | 6
WC | (South Korea) Lee Ye-ra | 1 | 0
(Russia) Natela Dzalamidze | 2 | 6 | 2
6 | (China) Lu Jiajing | 6 | 4 | 6

Qualifying competition
1 | (Belarus) Aliaksandra Sasnovich | 6 | 6
6 | (China) Lu Jiajing | 0 | 2

==== Second qualifier ====
First round
2 | (Czech Republic) Tereza Martincová | 0 | 6^{6}
(China) Liu Chang | 6 | 7^{8}
(Japan) Kotomi Takahata | 3 | 4
(Russia) Ksenia Lykina | 6 | 6
(Italy) Gaia Sanesi | 4 | 6^{1}
(Chinese Taipei) Lee Ya-hsuan | 6 | 7^{7}
WC | (South Korea) Lee Jin-ju | 1 | 2
7 | (Ukraine) Kateryna Kozlova | 6 | 6

Second round
(China) Liu Chang | 6 | 6
(Russia) Ksenia Lykina | 4 | 1
(Chinese Taipei) Lee Ya-hsuan | 3 | 3
7 | (Ukraine) Kateryna Kozlova | 6 | 6

Qualifying competition
(China) Liu Chang | 3 | 2
7 | (Ukraine) Kateryna Kozlova | 6 | 6

==== Third qualifier ====
First round
3 | (Japan) Shuko Aoyama | 7^{7} | 6^{4} | 5
(South Korea) Lee So-ra | 6^{2} | 7^{7} | 7
(Thailand) Nicha Lertpitaksinchai | 6^{4} | 6 | 6
(Czech Republic) Kateřina Vaňková | 7^{7} | 3 | 1
(Russia) Polina Monova | 4 | 2
(United States) Nicole Melichar | 6 | 6
(Japan) Miki Miyamura | 6 | 6
8 | (Czech Republic) Nicole Vaidišová | 2 | 3

Second round
(South Korea) Lee So-ra | 7^{7} | 6^{4} | 6
(Thailand) Nicha Lertpitaksinchai | 6^{3} | 7^{7} | 4
(United States) Nicole Melichar | 6 | 6
(Japan) Miki Miyamura | 4 | 1

Qualifying competition
(South Korea) Lee So-ra | 6^{6} | 5
(United States) Nicole Melichar | 7^{8} | 7

==== Fourth qualifier ====
First round
4 | (Spain) Paula Badosa Gibert | 2 | 7^{7} | 6
(Chinese Taipei) Hsu Ching-wen | 6 | 6^{2} | 4
(United Kingdom) Emily Webley-Smith | 6 | 6
WC | (South Korea) Kim Da-bin | 2 | 1
WC | (South Korea) Park Ji-min | 0 | 2
WC | (South Korea) Choi Ji-hee | 6 | 6
(China) Zhang Yuxuan | 6^{6} | 6 | 1
5 | (Russia) Ekaterina Bychkova | 7^{8} | 2 | 6

Second round
4 | (Spain) Paula Badosa Gibert | 6 | 6
(United Kingdom) Emily Webley-Smith | 4 | 3
WC | (South Korea) Choi Ji-hee | 0 | 3
5 | (Russia) Ekaterina Bychkova | 6 | 6

Qualifying competition
4 | (Spain) Paula Badosa Gibert | 6 | 6
5 | (Russia) Ekaterina Bychkova | 0 | 4
