= 2018 Kurume U.S.E Cup =

Professional tennis tournament

- Date: 14–20 May
- Edition: 14th
- Category: ITF Women's Circuit
- Prize money: $60,000
- Surface: Carpet
- Location: Kurume, Japan

Champions

Singles
- (Japan) Ayano Shimizu

Doubles
- (United Kingdom) Naomi Broady / (United States) Asia Muhammad
← 2017 ·	Kurume Cup	· 2019 →

The 2018 Kurume U.S.E Cup was a professional tennis tournament played on outdoor carpet courts. It was the fourteenth edition of the tournament and was part of the 2018 ITF Women's Circuit. It took place in Kurume, Japan, on 14–20 May 2018.

== Singles main draw entrants ==
=== Seeds ===
Country	Player	Rank^{1}	Seed
GBR	Naomi Broady	127	1
AUS	Arina Rodionova	130	2
GBR	Katie Boulter	176	3
JPN	Junri Namigata	211	4
GBR	Katy Dunne	225	5
SRB	Ivana Jorović	226	6
JPN	Ayano Shimizu	238	7
USA	Jacqueline Cako	249	8

- ^{1} Rankings as of 7 May 2018.

=== Other entrants ===
The following players received a wildcard into the singles main draw:

- (Japan) Robu Kajitani
- (Japan) Kanako Morisaki
- (Japan) Suzuho Oshino

The following players received entry from the qualifying draw:

- (Japan) Sakura Hondo
- (Japan) Ari Matsumoto
- (Australia) Abbie Myers
- (United States) Anastasia Nefedova

== Champions ==
=== Singles ===
- (Japan) Ayano Shimizu def. (Australia) Abbie Myers, 6–3, 7–5

=== Doubles ===
- (United Kingdom) Naomi Broady / (United States) Asia Muhammad def. (United Kingdom) Katy Dunne / (Papua New Guinea) Abigail Tere-Apisah, 6–2, 6–4
