= 2024 Kurume U.S.E Cup – Singles =

Singles
- 2024 Kurume U.S.E Cup

Final
- Champion: (United States) Emina Bektas
- Runner-up: (Australia) Arina Rodionova
- Score: 7–6^{(7–1)}, 3–6, 6–3

Events
Singles	Doubles
← 2023 ·	Kurume Cup	· 2025 →

Emina Bektas successfully defended her title, defeating Arina Rodionova in the final, 7–6^{(7–1)}, 3–6, 6–3.

== Seeds ==
1. (United States) Emina Bektas (champion)
2. (Australia) Arina Rodionova (final)
3. (Thailand) Mananchaya Sawangkaew (semifinals)
4. (Canada) Carol Zhao (quarterfinals)
5. (Australia) Maddison Inglis (second round)
6. (Japan) Haruka Kaji (first round)
7. (Japan) Aoi Ito (second round)
8. (South Korea) Jang Su-jeong (quarterfinals)

== Draw ==
=== Key ===
- Q = Qualifier
- WC = Wild card
- LL = Lucky loser
- Alt = Alternate
- SE = Special exempt
- PR = Protected ranking
- ITF = ITF entry
- JE = Junior exempt
- w/o = Walkover
- r = Retired
- d = Defaulted
- SR = Special ranking

=== Finals ===
Semifinals
1	(United States) Emina Bektas	6	7^{7}
Q	(Japan) Mei Yamaguchi	3	6^{3}
3	(Thailand) Mananchaya Sawangkaew	1	1
2	(Australia) Arina Rodionova	6	6

Final
1	(United States) Emina Bektas	7^{7}	3	6
2	(Australia) Arina Rodionova	6^{1}	6	3

=== Top half ===
First round
1	(United States) E Bektas	6	6
(Australia) L Cabrera	2	1
Q	(Japan) E Shimizu	2	6	7^{7}
Q	(Japan) M Matsuda	6	1	6^{4}
Q	(Japan) H Arakawa	6	6
WC	(Japan) Y Mizuguchi	4	2
(Japan) Y Naito	1	4
8	(South Korea) S-j Jang	6	6
4	(Canada) C Zhao	6	6
WC	(Japan) M Miyahara	3	0
(Japan) N Sato	6	6
(United Kingdom) SB Grey	2	3
(United States) D Hewitt	6	4	6
(Chinese Taipei) Y-h Lee	4	6	3
Q	(Japan) M Yamaguchi	6	6
6	(Japan) H Kaji	0	4

Second round
1	(United States) E Bektas	7	6
Q	(Japan) E Shimizu	5	1
Q	(Japan) H Arakawa	6^{3}	1
8	(South Korea) S-j Jang	7^{7}	6
4	(Canada) C Zhao	7	6^{2}	6
(Japan) N Sato	5	7^{7}	4
(United States) D Hewitt	1	2^{r}
Q	(Japan) M Yamaguchi	6	4

Quarterfinals
1	(United States) E Bektas	6	6
8	(South Korea) S-j Jang	1	3
4	(Canada) C Zhao	4	4
Q	(Japan) M Yamaguchi	6	6

Semifinals
1	(United States) E Bektas	6	7^{7}
Q	(Japan) M Yamaguchi	3	6^{3}

=== Bottom half ===
First round
5	(Australia) M Inglis	6	6
Q	(Japan) M Aikawa	2	3
(Japan) A Shimizu	4	5
Q	(Japan) M Kuramochi	6	7
SR	(Kazakhstan) Z Diyas	6	3	7^{7}
Q	(Japan) S Hosogi	4	6	6^{2}
P Iatcenko	7	1	4
3	(Thailand) M Sawangkaew	5	6	6
7	(Japan) A Ito	6	6
WC	(Japan) M Kobori	4	0
Q	(Australia) P Hule	6^{2}	6	3
(India) R Bhosale	7^{7}	4	6
(Chinese Taipei) E-s Liang	6	6
WC	(Japan) C Miyahara	2	1
(Japan) N Kawaguchi	6^{2}	1
2	(Australia) Ar Rodionova	7^{7}	6

Second round
5	(Australia) M Inglis	6	3	6^{2}
Q	(Japan) M Kuramochi	4	6	7^{7}
SR	(Kazakhstan) Z Diyas
3	(Thailand) M Sawangkaew	w/o
7	(Japan) A Ito	2	0
(India) R Bhosale	6	6
(Chinese Taipei) E-s Liang	4	2
2	(Australia) Ar Rodionova	6	6

Quarterfinals
Q	(Japan) M Kuramochi	7^{7}	5	4
3	(Thailand) M Sawangkaew	6^{3}	7	6
(India) R Bhosale	1	7^{7}	1^{r}
2	(Australia) Ar Rodionova	6	6^{5}	4

Semifinals
3	(Thailand) M Sawangkaew	1	1
2	(Australia) Ar Rodionova	6	6
