= 2018 Kurume U.S.E Cup – Doubles =

Doubles
- 2018 Kurume U.S.E Cup

Final
- Champions: (United Kingdom) Naomi Broady (United States) Asia Muhammad
- Runners-up: (United Kingdom) Katy Dunne (Papua New Guinea) Abigail Tere-Apisah
- Score: 6–2, 6–4

Events
Singles	Doubles
← 2017 ·	Kurume Cup	· 2019 →

Katy Dunne and Tammi Patterson were the defending champions, but both players chose to participate with different partners. Dunne partnered Abigail Tere-Apisah, while Patterson chose to play alongside Ayaka Okuno. Patterson lost in quarterfinals to Naomi Broady and Asia Muhammad.

Broady and Muhammad won the title, defeating Dunne and Tere-Apisah in the final, 6–2, 6–4.

== Seeds ==
1. (United Kingdom) Naomi Broady / (United States) Asia Muhammad (champions)
2. (Japan) Rika Fujiwara / (Russia) Ksenia Lykina (quarterfinals)
3. (United Kingdom) Tara Moore / (Switzerland) Amra Sadiković (first round)
4. (Japan) Momoko Kobori / (Japan) Hiroko Kuwata (semifinals)

== Draw ==
=== Key ===
- Q = Qualifier
- WC = Wild card
- LL = Lucky loser
- Alt = Alternate
- SE = Special exempt
- PR = Protected ranking
- ITF = ITF entry
- JE = Junior exempt
- w/o = Walkover
- r = Retired
- d = Defaulted
- SR = Special ranking

=== Draw ===
First round
1	(United Kingdom) N Broady (United States) A Muhammad	3	6	[11]
(Japan) M Nishimoto (Japan) K Takahata	6	4	[9]
WC	(Japan) S Akita (Japan) A Inoue	1	2
(Japan) A Okuno (Australia) T Patterson	6	6
4	(Japan) M Kobori (Japan) H Kuwata	1	7^{7}	[10]
(Japan) C Muramatsu (Australia) O Tjandramulia	6	6^{5}	[4]
WC	(Japan) M Eguchi (Japan) A Yoshitomi	5	6	[10]
Q	(Japan) C Hosonuma (Japan) K Morisaki	7	4	[6]
WC	(Japan) A Sonoda (Japan) R Ushijima	2	4
(Japan) E Hayashi (Japan) R Kajitani	6	6
Q	(United States) YK Chiang (Japan) N Hanatani	6	7^{7}
3	(United Kingdom) T Moore (Switzerland) A Sadiković	0	6^{3}
(United Kingdom) K Dunne (Papua New Guinea) A Tere-Apisah	6	4	[10]
(Japan) M Ozeki (Japan) Y Saigo	1	6	[6]
(Japan) H Kaji (Japan) A Shimizu	4	5
2	(Japan) R Fujiwara (Russia) K Lykina	6	7

Quarterfinals
1	(United Kingdom) N Broady (United States) A Muhammad	6	6
(Japan) A Okuno (Australia) T Patterson	2	2
4	(Japan) M Kobori (Japan) H Kuwata	4	6	[10]
WC	(Japan) M Eguchi (Japan) A Yoshitomi	6	4	[8]
(Japan) E Hayashi (Japan) R Kajitani	6	6
Q	(United States) YK Chiang (Japan) N Hanatani	4	2
(United Kingdom) K Dunne (Papua New Guinea) A Tere-Apisah	6	1	[10]
2	(Japan) R Fujiwara (Russia) K Lykina	4	6	[8]

Semifinals
1	(United Kingdom) N Broady (United States) A Muhammad	6	6
4	(Japan) M Kobori (Japan) H Kuwata	3	4
(Japan) E Hayashi (Japan) R Kajitani	0	5
(United Kingdom) K Dunne (Papua New Guinea) A Tere-Apisah	6	7

Final
1	(United Kingdom) N Broady (United States) A Muhammad	6	6
(United Kingdom) K Dunne (Papua New Guinea) A Tere-Apisah	2	4
