= 2023 Kurume U.S.E Cup – Singles =

Singles
- 2023 Kurume U.S.E Cup

Final
- Champion: (United States) Emina Bektas
- Runner-up: (China) Ma Yexin
- Score: 7–5, 5–7, 6–1

Events
Singles	Doubles
← 2019 ·	Kurume Cup	· 2024 →

Rebecca Marino was the defending champion but chose not to participate.

Emina Bektas won the title, defeating Ma Yexin in the final, 7–5, 5–7, 6–1.

== Seeds ==
1. (United States) Emina Bektas (champion)
2. (Israel) Lina Glushko (second round)
3. (Japan) Haruka Kaji (semifinals)
4. (Australia) Lizette Cabrera (semifinals)
5. (Chinese Taipei) Liang En-shuo (quarterfinals)
6. (Japan) Rina Saigo (second round, retired)
7. (Japan) Momoko Kobori (first round)
8. (China) Wang Yafan (quarterfinals)

== Draw ==
=== Key ===
- Q = Qualifier
- WC = Wild card
- LL = Lucky loser
- Alt = Alternate
- SE = Special exempt
- PR = Protected ranking
- ITF = ITF entry
- JE = Junior exempt
- w/o = Walkover
- r = Retired
- d = Defaulted
- SR = Special ranking

=== Finals ===
Semifinals
1	(United States) Emina Bektas	6	6
3	(Japan) Haruka Kaji	3	4
4	(Australia) Lizette Cabrera	1	7^{7}	4
(China) Ma Yexin	6	6^{5}	6

Final
1	(United States) Emina Bektas	7	5	6
(China) Ma Yexin	5	7	1

=== Top half ===
First round
1	(United States) E Bektas	6	6
Q	(Japan) R Ueda	3	1
Q	(Japan) Ma Mushika	6	0	6
Q	(Japan) R Matsuda	4	6	3
(Australia) A Parnaby	6	7
Q	(Japan) J Namigata	2	5
(Denmark) J Svendsen	3	0
5	(Chinese Taipei) E-s Liang	6	6
3	(Japan) H Kaji	6	6
WC	(Japan) H Sato	1	2
(Australia) T Gibson	4	6	1
Q	(Japan) S Akita	6	1	6
SR	(Japan) A Shimizu	6	6
(Japan) E Sema	3	0
WC	(Japan) M Kuramochi	6	3	6
7	(Japan) M Kobori	3	6	4

Second round
1	(United States) E Bektas	6	6
Q	(Japan) Ma Mushika	2	2
(Australia) A Parnaby	3	2
5	(Chinese Taipei) E-s Liang	6	6
3	(Japan) H Kaji	7^{9}	6
Q	(Japan) S Akita	6^{7}	0
SR	(Japan) A Shimizu	6	6
WC	(Japan) M Kuramochi	1	0

Quarterfinals
1	(United States) E Bektas	4	6	7^{7}
5	(Chinese Taipei) E-s Liang	6	2	6^{2}
3	(Japan) H Kaji	6	6
SR	(Japan) A Shimizu	2	4

Semifinals
1	(United States) E Bektas	6	6
3	(Japan) H Kaji	3	4

=== Bottom half ===
First round
8	(China) Y Wang	6	7
Q	(Japan) M Yamaguchi	1	5
SE	(Japan) N Kawaguchi	3	4
(Japan) E Shimizu	6	6
(Japan) N Hanatani	6^{4}	2
(Japan) S Imamura	7^{7}	6
Q	(Japan) A Ito	3	6	4
4	(Australia) L Cabrera	6	4	6
6	(Japan) R Saigo	6	6
Q	(Japan) L-M Rioux	1	1
(China) Y Ma	6	6
(Japan) M Ozeki	1	3
WC	(Japan) A Yamaguchi	5	0
(Poland) O Lincer	7	6
WC	(Japan) H Kobayashi	4	1
2	(Israel) L Glushko	6	6

Second round
8	(China) Y Wang	6	6
(Japan) E Shimizu	2	0
(Japan) S Imamura	3	3
4	(Australia) L Cabrera	6	6
6	(Japan) R Saigo	3	1^{r}
(China) Y Ma	6	4
(Poland) O Lincer	4	7^{7}	6
2	(Israel) L Glushko	6	6^{4}	4

Quarterfinals
8	(China) Y Wang	5	6	4
4	(Australia) L Cabrera	7	4	6
(China) Y Ma	6	6
(Poland) O Lincer	4	0

Semifinals
4	(Australia) L Cabrera	1	7^{7}	4
(China) Y Ma	6	6^{5}	6
