= 2016 Korea Open – Doubles =

Doubles
- 2016 Korea Open

Final
- Champions: (Belgium) Kirsten Flipkens (Sweden) Johanna Larsson
- Runners-up: (Japan) Akiko Omae (Thailand) Peangtarn Plipuech
- Score: 6–2, 6–3

Events
Singles	Doubles
- Korea Open

Lara Arruabarrena and Andreja Klepač were the defending champions, but Arruabarrena chose not to participate this year and Klepač chose to compete in Tokyo instead.

Kirsten Flipkens and Johanna Larsson won the title, defeating Akiko Omae and Peangtarn Plipuech in the final, 6–2, 6–3.

== Seeds ==
1. (Japan) Eri Hozumi / (Georgia (country)) Oksana Kalashnikova (quarterfinals)
2. (Belgium) Kirsten Flipkens / (Sweden) Johanna Larsson (champions)
3. (Netherlands) Demi Schuurs / (Czech Republic) Renata Voráčová (semifinals)
4. (Czech Republic) Lenka Kunčíková / (Czech Republic) Karolína Stuchlá (first round)

== Draw ==
Key

- Q = Qualifier
- WC = Wild card
- LL = Lucky loser
- Alt = Alternate
- ITF = ITF entry
- PR = Protected ranking
- SR = Special ranking
- SE = Special exempt
- JE = Junior exempt
- JR = Junior Accelerator Programme entrant
- CO = College Accelerator Programme entrant
- NG = Next Gen Accelerator Program entrant
- w/o = Walkover
- r = Retired
- d = Defaulted

First round
1	(Japan) E Hozumi (Georgia (country)) O Kalashnikova	6	6
(United States) J Cako (United Kingdom) E Webley-Smith	4	2
(Japan) A Omae (Thailand) Pe Plipuech	6	6
(South Korea) N-l Han (Thailand) N Lertpitaksinchai	4	3
3	(Netherlands) D Schuurs (Czech Republic) R Voráčová	6	7
WC	(South Korea) S-y Hong (South Korea) S-k Kang	3	5
(Bulgaria) A Naydenova (Czech Republic) Kr Plíšková	w/o
(Czech Republic) T Martincová (Poland) K Piter
WC	(South Korea) S-h Han (South Korea) D-b Kim	2	1
(Russia) K Lykina (Japan) R Sawayanagi	6	6
(Japan) A Okuno (Netherlands) A Rus	6	7^{7}
4	(Czech Republic) L Kunčíková (Czech Republic) K Stuchlá	3	6^{5}
(Austria) T Paszek (Romania) PM Țig	3	6	[10]
(South Korea) S-j Jang (South Korea) S-r Lee	6	3	[5]
(Greece) M Sakkari (Spain) S Sorribes Tormo	7^{7}	5	[7]
2	(Belgium) K Flipkens (Sweden) J Larsson	6^{5}	7	[10]

Quarterfinals
1	(Japan) E Hozumi (Georgia (country)) O Kalashnikova	6^{2}	6	[6]
(Japan) A Omae (Thailand) Pe Plipuech	7^{7}	4	[10]
3	(Netherlands) D Schuurs (Czech Republic) R Voráčová	6^{6}	6	[11]
(Bulgaria) A Naydenova (Czech Republic) Kr Plíšková	7^{8}	1	[9]
(Russia) K Lykina (Japan) R Sawayanagi	6^{7}	6	[10]
(Japan) A Okuno (Netherlands) A Rus	7^{9}	4	[5]
(Austria) T Paszek (Romania) PM Țig	2	3
2	(Belgium) K Flipkens (Sweden) J Larsson	6	6

Semifinals
(Japan) A Omae (Thailand) Pe Plipuech	6	7^{7}
3	(Netherlands) D Schuurs (Czech Republic) R Voráčová	2	6^{3}
(Russia) K Lykina (Japan) R Sawayanagi	2	2
2	(Belgium) K Flipkens (Sweden) J Larsson	6	6

Final
(Japan) A Omae (Thailand) Pe Plipuech	2	3
2	(Belgium) K Flipkens (Sweden) J Larsson	6	6
