= 2016 Wuhan Open – Singles =

Singles
- 2016 Wuhan Open

Final
- Champion: (Czech Republic) Petra Kvitová
- Runner-up: (Slovakia) Dominika Cibulková
- Score: 6–1, 6–1

Events
Singles	Doubles
- Wuhan Open

Petra Kvitová defeated Dominika Cibulková in the final, 6–1, 6–1 to win the singles tennis title at the 2016 Wuhan Open. It was her second Wuhan Open title.

Venus Williams was the defending champion, but lost in the third round to Svetlana Kuznetsova.

== Seeds ==
The top eight seeds received a bye into the second round.

1. (Germany) Angelique Kerber (third round)
2. (Spain) Garbiñe Muguruza (second round)
3. (Poland) Agnieszka Radwańska (quarterfinals)
4. (Romania) Simona Halep (semifinals)
5. (Czech Republic) Karolína Plíšková (third round)
6. (United States) Venus Williams (third round)
7. (Spain) Carla Suárez Navarro (third round)
8. (United States) Madison Keys (quarterfinals)

9. (Russia) Svetlana Kuznetsova (semifinals)
10. (Slovakia) Dominika Cibulková (final)
11. (United Kingdom) Johanna Konta (quarterfinals)
12. (Switzerland) Timea Bacsinszky (first round, retired)
13. (Italy) Roberta Vinci (second round)
14. (Czech Republic) Petra Kvitová (champion)
15. (Russia) Anastasia Pavlyuchenkova (first round, retired)
16. (Australia) Samantha Stosur (first round)

Click on the seed number of a player to go to their draw section.

== Draw ==
Key

- Q = Qualifier
- WC = Wild card
- LL = Lucky loser
- Alt = Alternate
- ITF = ITF entry
- PR = Protected ranking
- SR = Special ranking
- SE = Special exempt
- JE = Junior exempt
- JR = Junior Accelerator Programme entrant
- CO = College Accelerator Programme entrant
- NG = Next Gen Accelerator Program entrant
- w/o = Walkover
- r = Retired
- d = Defaulted

=== Finals ===
Quarterfinals
14	(Czech Republic) Petra Kvitová	6	6
11	(United Kingdom) Johanna Konta	3	4
4	(Romania) Simona Halep	6	6
8	(United States) Madison Keys	4	2
9	(Russia) Svetlana Kuznetsova	1	7^{11}	6
3	(Poland) Agnieszka Radwańska	6	6^{9}	4
10	(Slovakia) Dominika Cibulková	6	3	6
(Czech Republic) Barbora Strýcová	3	6	4

Semifinals
14	(Czech Republic) Petra Kvitová	6	6
4	(Romania) Simona Halep	1	2
9	(Russia) Svetlana Kuznetsova	6	3	4
10	(Slovakia) Dominika Cibulková	3	6	6

Final
14	(Czech Republic) Petra Kvitová	6	6
10	(Slovakia) Dominika Cibulková	1	1

=== Top half ===
==== Section 1 ====
First round
(United States) C Vandeweghe	6^{5}	3
(France) K Mladenovic	7^{7}	6
Q	(United States) B Mattek-Sands	6	3	4
(Ukraine) E Svitolina	4	6	6
(Latvia) J Ostapenko	3	1
14	(Czech Republic) P Kvitová	6	6
11	(United Kingdom) J Konta	6	6
(Germany) A Beck	1	2
WC	(China) S Peng	7^{7}	3	4
(China) S Zhang	6^{5}	6	6
(Belgium) Y Wickmayer	6	7^{7}
(United States) S Rogers	3	6^{1}

Second round
1	(Germany) A Kerber	6^{4}	6	6
(France) K Mladenovic	7^{7}	1	4
(Ukraine) E Svitolina	3	1
14	(Czech Republic) P Kvitová	6	6
11	(United Kingdom) J Konta	6	6
(China) S Zhang	3	3
(Belgium) Y Wickmayer	4	3
7	(Spain) C Suárez Navarro	6	6

Third round
1	(Germany) A Kerber	7^{12}	5	4
14	(Czech Republic) P Kvitová	6^{10}	7	6
11	(United Kingdom) J Konta	7	7^{8}
7	(Spain) C Suárez Navarro	5	6^{6}

Quarterfinals
14	(Czech Republic) P Kvitová	6	6
11	(United Kingdom) J Konta	3	4

==== Section 2 ====
First round
(Romania) I-C Begu	4	7^{7}	6
Q	(Russia) E Kulichkova	6	6^{4}	2
WC	(China) S Zheng	0	3
(Kazakhstan) Y Shvedova	6	6
(Puerto Rico) M Puig	3	3
13	(Italy) R Vinci	6	6
12	(Switzerland) T Bacsinszky	3	3^{r}
Q	(United States) L Chirico	6	4
Q	(Russia) D Kasatkina	6	6
Q	(Germany) J Görges	0	4
(Croatia) M Lučić-Baroni	2	4
(France) C Garcia	6	6

Second round
4	(Romania) S Halep	6	2
(Romania) I-C Begu	3	0^{r}
(Kazakhstan) Y Shvedova	7	6
13	(Italy) R Vinci	5	2
Q	(United States) L Chirico	1	1
Q	(Russia) D Kasatkina	6	6
(France) C Garcia	3	4
8	(United States) M Keys	6	6

Third round
4	(Romania) S Halep	6	6
(Kazakhstan) Y Shvedova	3	3
Q	(Russia) D Kasatkina	1	6	4
8	(United States) M Keys	6	4	6

Quarterfinals
4	(Romania) S Halep	6	6
8	(United States) M Keys	4	2

=== Bottom half ===
==== Section 3 ====
First round
(Kazakhstan) Y Putintseva	6	4
(Latvia) A Sevastova	1	1^{r}
Q	(United Kingdom) H Watson	3	1^{r}
(United States) M Brengle	6	2
(Switzerland) B Bencic	3	4^{r}
9	(Russia) S Kuznetsova	6	3
16	(Australia) S Stosur	3	2
(Denmark) C Wozniacki	6	6
Q	(Czech Republic) K Siniaková	6	7
(Hungary) T Babos	3	5
WC	(Germany) S Lisicki	1	2
(Russia) E Makarova	6	6

Second round
6	(United States) V Williams	6	6
(Kazakhstan) Y Putintseva	3	2
(United States) M Brengle	0	4
9	(Russia) S Kuznetsova	6	6
(Denmark) C Wozniacki	6	6
Q	(Czech Republic) K Siniaková	4	4
(Russia) E Makarova	4	1
3	(Poland) A Radwańska	6	6

Third round
6	(United States) V Williams	2	2
9	(Russia) S Kuznetsova	6	6
(Denmark) C Wozniacki	4	2
3	(Poland) A Radwańska	6	6

Quarterfinals
9	(Russia) S Kuznetsova	1	7^{11}	6
3	(Poland) A Radwańska	6	6^{9}	4

==== Section 4 ====
First round
(United States) V Lepchenko	5	3
(Czech Republic) L Šafářová	7	6
(Montenegro) D Kovinić	7^{9}	5	4
(Germany) L Siegemund	6^{7}	7	6
Q	(France) A Cornet	2	6	3
10	(Slovakia) D Cibulková	6	2	6
15	(Russia) A Pavlyuchenkova	7^{7}	4	1^{r}
(Japan) M Doi	6^{3}	6	3
(Italy) S Errani	1	6	1
(Czech Republic) B Strýcová	6	3	6
(Serbia) J Janković	6	6
(Australia) D Gavrilova	2	2

Second round
5	(Czech Republic) Ka Plíšková	6	7
(Czech Republic) L Šafářová	3	5
(Germany) L Siegemund	6	3	4
10	(Slovakia) D Cibulková	2	6	6
(Japan) M Doi	7	0	2
(Czech Republic) B Strýcová	5	6	6
(Serbia) J Janković	6	7^{7}
2	(Spain) G Muguruza	4	6^{2}

Third round
5	(Czech Republic) Ka Plíšková	2	2
10	(Slovakia) D Cibulková	6	6
(Czech Republic) B Strýcová	1	6	7
(Serbia) J Janković	6	4	5

Quarterfinals
10	(Slovakia) D Cibulková	6	3	6
(Czech Republic) B Strýcová	3	6	4

== Qualifying ==
=== Seeds ===
1. (Russia) Daria Kasatkina (qualified)
2. (United States) Christina McHale (qualifying competition)
3. (Czech Republic) Kateřina Siniaková (qualified)
4. (Croatia) Ana Konjuh (first round)
5. (Romania) Monica Niculescu (withdrew, still playing in Seoul)
6. (France) Alizé Cornet (qualified)
7. (United States) Alison Riske (qualifying competition)
8. (Germany) Julia Görges (qualified)
9. (Croatia) Mirjana Lučić-Baroni (moved to main draw)
10. (Ukraine) Kateryna Bondarenko (qualifying competition)
11. (China) Wang Qiang (qualifying competition)
12. (France) Pauline Parmentier (qualifying competition)
13. (United States) Nicole Gibbs (first round)
14. (United Kingdom) Heather Watson (qualified)
15. (United States) Louisa Chirico (qualified)
16. (China) Duan Yingying (qualifying competition)
17. (China) Zhang Kailin (first round)

=== Qualifiers ===
1. (Russia) Daria Kasatkina
2. (United States) Louisa Chirico
3. (Czech Republic) Kateřina Siniaková
4. (United States) Bethanie Mattek-Sands
5. (United Kingdom) Heather Watson
6. (France) Alizé Cornet
7. (Russia) Elizaveta Kulichkova
8. (Germany) Julia Görges

=== Draw ===
==== First qualifier ====
First round
1	(Russia) Daria Kasatkina	6	4	7
Alt	(Czech Republic) Lucie Hradecká	4	6	5
(Austria) Tamira Paszek	1	1^{r}
12	(France) Pauline Parmentier	6	3

Qualifying competition
1	(Russia) Daria Kasatkina	6	6
12	(France) Pauline Parmentier	2	3

==== Second qualifier ====
First round
2	(United States) Christina McHale	6	6
(China) Zhu Lin	0	2
(New Zealand) Marina Erakovic	6	6^{6}	3
15	(United States) Louisa Chirico	4	7^{8}	6

Qualifying competition
2	(United States) Christina McHale	3	6^{3}
15	(United States) Louisa Chirico	6	7^{7}

==== Third qualifier ====
First round
3	(Czech Republic) Kateřina Siniaková	6	6
(China) Han Xinyun	4	0
Alt	(Italy) Cristiana Ferrando	2	1
16	(China) Duan Yingying	6	6

Qualifying competition
3	(Czech Republic) Kateřina Siniaková	6	6
16	(China) Duan Yingying	3	3

==== Fourth qualifier ====
First round
4	(Croatia) Ana Konjuh	0	0
(United States) Grace Min	6	6
(United States) Bethanie Mattek-Sands	6	6
17	(China) Zhang Kailin	1	3

Qualifying competition
(United States) Grace Min	2	4
(United States) Bethanie Mattek-Sands	6	6

==== Fifth qualifier ====
First round
Alt	(Slovenia) Andreja Klepač	2	1
(United States) Samantha Crawford	6	6
WC	(China) Liu Chang	1	6	4
14	(United Kingdom) Heather Watson	6	0	6

Qualifying competition
(United States) Samantha Crawford	6^{3}	2
14	(United Kingdom) Heather Watson	7^{7}	6

==== Sixth qualifier ====
First round
6	(France) Alizé Cornet	7	7^{7}
(United States) Jennifer Brady	5	6^{4}
(Germany) Tatjana Maria	7	3	3
10	(Ukraine) Kateryna Bondarenko	5	6	6

Qualifying competition
6	(France) Alizé Cornet	6	6
10	(Ukraine) Kateryna Bondarenko	2	1

==== Seventh qualifier ====
First round
7	(United States) Alison Riske	6	1	6
Alt	(Australia) Anastasia Rodionova	0	6	4
(Russia) Elizaveta Kulichkova	5	7^{8}	6
13	(United States) Nicole Gibbs	7	6^{6}	2

Qualifying competition
7	(United States) Alison Riske	7^{7}	3	4
(Russia) Elizaveta Kulichkova	6^{2}	6	6

==== Eighth qualifier ====
First round
8	(Germany) Julia Görges	6	6
Alt	(Serbia) Aleksandra Krunić	2	2
WC	(China) Wang Yafan	3	5
11	(China) Wang Qiang	6	7

Qualifying competition
8	(Germany) Julia Görges	7	7^{7}
11	(China) Wang Qiang	5	6^{2}
