= 2019 Kurume U.S.E Cup – Singles =

Singles
- 2019 Kurume U.S.E Cup

Final
- Champion: (Canada) Rebecca Marino
- Runner-up: (Japan) Yuki Naito
- Score: 6–4, 7–6^{(7–0)}

Events
| Singles | Doubles |
| ← 2018 · | Kurume Cup | · 2023 → |

Ayano Shimizu was the defending champion, but lost to Sakura Hondo in the first round.

Rebecca Marino won the title, defeating Yuki Naito in the final, 6–4, 7–6^{(7–0)}.

== Seeds ==
1. (United Kingdom) Heather Watson (quarterfinals)
2. (Japan) Ayano Shimizu (first round)
3. (United States) Kristie Ahn (withdrew)
4. (Canada) Rebecca Marino (champion)
5. (Japan) Momoko Kobori (first round)
6. (United States) Jamie Loeb (first round)
7. (Australia) Kaylah McPhee (semifinals)
8. (Japan) Hiroko Kuwata (first round)

== Draw ==
=== Key ===
- Q = Qualifier
- WC = Wild card
- LL = Lucky loser
- Alt = Alternate
- SE = Special exempt
- PR = Protected ranking
- ITF = ITF entry
- JE = Junior exempt
- w/o = Walkover
- r = Retired
- d = Defaulted
- SR = Special ranking

=== Finals ===
Semifinals
7 | (Australia) Kaylah McPhee | 3 | 2
4 | (Canada) Rebecca Marino | 6 | 6
Q | (Japan) Yuki Naito | 6 | 6
Q | (Japan) Yuuki Tanaka | 1 | 2

Final
4 | (Canada) Rebecca Marino | 6 | 7^{7}
Q | (Japan) Yuki Naito | 4 | 6^{0}

=== Top half ===
First round
1 | (United Kingdom) H Watson | 5 | 6 | 6
(Japan) H Kaji | 7 | 2 | 0
(Japan) M Hontama | 2 | 3
(United States) E Bektas | 6 | 6
(Japan) J Namigata | 6 | 4 | 6
Q | (Japan) H Arakawa | 4 | 6 | 4
WC | (Japan) M Matsuda | 2 | 4
7 | (Australia) K McPhee | 6 | 6
4 | (Canada) R Marino | 7 | 6
Q | (Japan) A Miyamoto | 5 | 2
(Japan) R Ozaki | 3 | 1
(Japan) M Imanishi | 6 | 6
(Turkey) B Cengiz | 6 | 6
WC | (Japan) K Morisaki | 1 | 0
WC | (Japan) N Sato | 6 | 6
5 | (Japan) M Kobori | 2 | 1

Second round
1 | (United Kingdom) H Watson | 4 | 6 | 6
(United States) E Bektas | 6 | 4 | 2
(Japan) J Namigata | 4 | 0
7 | (Australia) K McPhee | 6 | 6
4 | (Canada) R Marino | 6 | 6
(Japan) M Imanishi | 3 | 4
(Turkey) B Cengiz | 6 | 6
WC | (Japan) N Sato | 2 | 3

Quarterfinals
1 | (United Kingdom) H Watson | 5 | 2
7 | (Australia) K McPhee | 7 | 6
4 | (Canada) R Marino | 4 | 6 | 6
(Turkey) B Cengiz | 6 | 1 | 4

Semifinals
7 | (Australia) K McPhee | 3 | 2
4 | (Canada) R Marino | 6 | 6

=== Bottom half ===
First round
8 | (Japan) H Kuwata | 7 | 0 | 2
Q | (United States) E Shibahara | 5 | 6 | 6
Q | (Japan) M Ayukawa | 4 | 6^{7}
(Australia) A Bai | 6 | 7^{9}
(Australia) M Inglis | 2 | 2
Q | (Japan) Y Naito | 6 | 6
(Japan) M Uchijima | 2 | 3
LL | (Australia) A Bozovic | 6 | 6
6 | (United States) J Loeb | 6^{2} | 2
(Serbia) J Jakšić | 7^{7} | 6
LL | (Japan) H Sakatsume | 2 | 7^{7} | 4
(United Kingdom) N Broady | 6 | 6^{3} | 6
(Japan) K Okamura | 4 | 6 | 4
Q | (Japan) Y Tanaka | 6 | 4 | 6
WC | (Japan) S Hondo | 6 | 6
2 | (Japan) A Shimizu | 1 | 1

Second round
Q | (United States) E Shibahara | 6 | 4 | 6
(Australia) A Bai | 3 | 6 | 2
Q | (Japan) Y Naito | 6 | 1 | 6
LL | (Australia) A Bozovic | 2 | 6 | 3
(Serbia) J Jakšić | 2 | 6 | 7^{7}
(United Kingdom) N Broady | 6 | 2 | 6^{1}
Q | (Japan) Y Tanaka | 6 | 6
WC | (Japan) S Hondo | 0 | 3

Quarterfinals
Q | (United States) E Shibahara | 4 | 7^{7} | 2
Q | (Japan) Y Naito | 6 | 6^{3} | 6
(Serbia) J Jakšić | 6 | 3 | 4
Q | (Japan) Y Tanaka | 2 | 6 | 6

Semifinals
Q | (Japan) Y Naito | 6 | 6
Q | (Japan) Y Tanaka | 1 | 2
