= 2024 Kurume U.S.E Cup =

Tennis tournament

- Date: 13–19 May 2024
- Edition: 17th
- Category: ITF Women's World Tennis Tour
- Prize money: $60,000
- Surface: Carpet / Outdoor
- Location: Kurume, Japan

Champions

Singles
- (United States) Emina Bektas

Doubles
- (United Kingdom) Madeleine Brooks / (United Kingdom) Sarah Beth Grey
- Kurume Cup

The 2024 Kurume U.S.E Cup was a professional tennis tournament play on outdoor carpet courts. It was the seventeenth edition of the tournament, which was part of the 2024 ITF Women's World Tennis Tour. It took place in Kurume, Japan, between 13 and 19 May 2024.

== Champions ==
=== Singles ===
- (United States) Emina Bektas def. (Australia) Arina Rodionova, 7–6^{(7–1)}, 3–6, 6–3

=== Doubles ===
- (United Kingdom) Madeleine Brooks / (United Kingdom) Sarah Beth Grey def. (Japan) Momoko Kobori / (Japan) Ayano Shimizu, 6–4, 6–0

== Singles main draw entrants ==
=== Seeds ===
Country	Player	Rank	Seed
USA	Emina Bektas	97	1
AUS	Arina Rodionova	108	2
THA	Mananchaya Sawangkaew	214	3
CAN	Carol Zhao	223	4
AUS	Maddison Inglis	226	5
JPN	Haruka Kaji	274	6
JPN	Aoi Ito	276	7
KOR	Jang Su-jeong	286	8

- Rankings are as of 6 May 2024.

=== Other entrants ===
The following players received wildcards into the singles main draw:

- (Japan) Momoko Kobori
- (Japan) Chika Miyahara
- (Japan) Mina Miyahara
- (Japan) Yuki Mizuguchi

The following player received entry into the singles main draw using a special ranking:

- (Kazakhstan) Zarina Diyas

The following players received entry from the qualifying draw:

- (Japan) Mayuka Aikawa
- (Japan) Haruna Arakawa
- (Japan) Sakura Hosogi
- (Australia) Petra Hule
- (Japan) Miho Kuramochi
- (Japan) Misaki Matsuda
- (Japan) Eri Shimizu
- (Japan) Mei Yamaguchi
