= 2019 Kurume U.S.E Cup – Doubles =

Doubles
- 2019 Kurume U.S.E Cup

Final
- Champions: (Japan) Hiroko Kuwata (United States) Ena Shibahara
- Runners-up: (Japan) Erina Hayashi (Japan) Moyuka Uchijima
- Score: 0–6, 6–4, [10–5]

Events
Singles	Doubles
← 2018 ·	Kurume Cup	· 2023 →

Naomi Broady and Asia Muhammad were the defending champions, but Muhammad chose not to participate. Broady partnered alongside Ayaka Okuno but lost in the first round to Emina Bektas and Tara Moore.

Hiroko Kuwata and Ena Shibahara won the title, defeating Erina Hayashi and Moyuka Uchijima in the final, 0–6, 6–4, [10–5].

== Seeds ==
1. (Japan) Hiroko Kuwata / (United States) Ena Shibahara (champions)
2. (Japan) Momoko Kobori / (Japan) Ayano Shimizu (quarterfinals)
3. (United Kingdom) Naomi Broady / (Japan) Ayaka Okuno (first round)
4. (Australia) Alison Bai / (Serbia) Jovana Jakšić (quarterfinals)

== Draw ==
=== Key ===
- Q = Qualifier
- WC = Wild card
- LL = Lucky loser
- Alt = Alternate
- SE = Special exempt
- PR = Protected ranking
- ITF = ITF entry
- JE = Junior exempt
- w/o = Walkover
- r = Retired
- d = Defaulted
- SR = Special ranking

=== Draw ===
First round
1	(Japan) H Kuwata (United States) E Shibahara	4	6	[10]
(Japan) H Arakawa (Japan) M Hontama	6	3	[7]
(Japan) K Morisaki (Japan) M Yonehara	6	6
(Japan) J Namigata (Japan) K Okamura	4	2
4	(Australia) A Bai (Serbia) J Jakšić	6	6
WC	(Japan) A Sonoda (Japan) A Yamaguchi	1	1
(Japan) M Ayukawa (Japan) H Kaji	6	4	[10]
WC	(Japan) M Hasegawa (Japan) M Yamaguchi	3	6	[7]
(Australia) M Inglis (Australia) K McPhee	3	3
(Japan) E Hayashi (Japan) M Uchijima	6	6
(United States) E Bektas (United Kingdom) T Moore	6	3	[10]
3	(United Kingdom) N Broady (Japan) A Okuno	3	6	[6]
WC	(Japan) M Matsuda (Japan) A Matsumoto	2	7^{7}	[10]
(Australia) A Bozovic (Turkey) B Cengiz	6	6^{5}	[8]
(Japan) M Ozeki (Japan) R Ueda	3	6	[6]
2	(Japan) M Kobori (Japan) A Shimizu	6	2	[10]

Quarterfinals
1	(Japan) H Kuwata (United States) E Shibahara	1	6	[10]
(Japan) K Morisaki (Japan) M Yonehara	6	2	[4]
4	(Australia) A Bai (Serbia) J Jakšić	6	5	[2]
(Japan) M Ayukawa (Japan) H Kaji	1	7	[10]
(Japan) E Hayashi (Japan) M Uchijima	7	3	[10]
(United States) E Bektas (United Kingdom) T Moore	5	6	[3]
WC	(Japan) M Matsuda (Japan) A Matsumoto	7^{7}	2	[10]
2	(Japan) M Kobori (Japan) A Shimizu	6^{4}	6	[5]

Semifinals
1	(Japan) H Kuwata (United States) E Shibahara	6	6
(Japan) M Ayukawa (Japan) H Kaji	4	2
(Japan) E Hayashi (Japan) M Uchijima	6	6
WC	(Japan) M Matsuda (Japan) A Matsumoto	1	1

Final
1	(Japan) H Kuwata (United States) E Shibahara	0	6	[10]
(Japan) E Hayashi (Japan) M Uchijima	6	4	[5]
