= 2016 Korea Open – Singles =

Singles
- 2016 Korea Open

Final
- Champion: (Spain) Lara Arruabarrena
- Runner-up: (Romania) Monica Niculescu
- Score: 6–0, 2–6, 6–0

Details
- Draw: 32
- Seeds: 8

Events
Singles	Doubles
- Korea Open

Irina-Camelia Begu was the defending champion, but lost in the second round to Jana Čepelová.

Lara Arruabarrena won the title, defeating Monica Niculescu in the final, 6–0, 2–6, 6–0.

== Seeds ==
1. (Romania) Irina-Camelia Begu (second round)
2. (Sweden) Johanna Larsson (quarterfinals)
3. (China) Zhang Shuai (semifinals)
4. (France) Kristina Mladenovic (second round)
5. (Romania) Monica Niculescu (final)
6. (Belgium) Kirsten Flipkens (second round)
7. (United States) Nicole Gibbs (first round)
8. (United States) Louisa Chirico (second round)

== Draw ==
Key

- Q = Qualifier
- WC = Wild card
- LL = Lucky loser
- Alt = Alternate
- ITF = ITF entry
- PR = Protected ranking
- SR = Special ranking
- SE = Special exempt
- JE = Junior exempt
- JR = Junior Accelerator Programme entrant
- CO = College Accelerator Programme entrant
- NG = Next Gen Accelerator Program entrant
- w/o = Walkover
- r = Retired
- d = Defaulted

=== Finals ===
Semifinals
5	(Romania) Monica Niculescu	6	6
3	(China) Zhang Shuai	0	4
(Romania) Patricia Maria Țig	1	2
(Spain) Lara Arruabarrena	6	6

Final
5	(Romania) Monica Niculescu	0	6	0
(Spain) Lara Arruabarrena	6	2	6

=== Top half ===
First round
1	(Romania) I-C Begu	6	6
WC	(South Korea) S-j Jang	2	1
(Slovakia) J Čepelová	6	6
WC	(South Korea) S-r Lee	3	4
Q	(Poland) K Piter	3	2
(Slovakia) AK Schmiedlová	6	6
Q	(Japan) E Hozumi	3	0
5	(Romania) M Niculescu	6	6
3	(China) S Zhang	6	3	6
(Greece) M Sakkari	3	6	4
(Switzerland) S Vögele	2	6	3
(United States) B Mattek-Sands	6	3	6
(Italy) C Giorgi	6	6
WC	(South Korea) N-l Han	3	2
(Germany) M Barthel	5	6	6
7	(United States) N Gibbs	7	4	2

Second round
1	(Romania) I-C Begu	3	6	3
(Slovakia) J Čepelová	6	4	6
(Slovakia) AK Schmiedlová	2	2
5	(Romania) M Niculescu	6	6
3	(China) S Zhang	6	7
(United States) B Mattek-Sands	3	5
(Italy) C Giorgi	2	6	6
(Germany) M Barthel	6	1	4

Quarterfinals
(Slovakia) J Čepelová	4	2
5	(Romania) M Niculescu	6	6
3	(China) S Zhang	6	6
(Italy) C Giorgi	2	4

Semifinals
5	(Romania) M Niculescu	6	6
3	(China) S Zhang	0	4

=== Bottom half ===
First round
6	(Belgium) K Flipkens	5	6	6
(Czech Republic) Kr Plíšková	7	2	2
(New Zealand) M Erakovic	6	5	4
(Romania) PM Țig	2	7	6
(Spain) S Sorribes Tormo	6	6
(Austria) T Paszek	1	3
Q	(Thailand) L Kumkhum	2	5
4	(France) K Mladenovic	6	7
8	(United States) L Chirico	7	6
(China) Y Duan	5	3
(Spain) L Arruabarrena	6	6
Q	(Netherlands) A Rus	2	2
SE	(Czech Republic) T Martincová	2	3
(Ukraine) K Kozlova	6	6
(United States) G Min	6	2	2
2	(Sweden) J Larsson	0	6	6

Second round
6	(Belgium) K Flipkens	4	4
(Romania) PM Țig	6	6
(Spain) S Sorribes Tormo	1	6	6
4	(France) K Mladenovic	6	2	4
8	(United States) L Chirico	6	6^{4}	6^{2}
(Spain) L Arruabarrena	4	7^{7}	7^{7}
(Ukraine) K Kozlova	3	6	2
2	(Sweden) J Larsson	6	1	6

Quarterfinals
(Romania) PM Țig	7^{7}	3	6
(Spain) S Sorribes Tormo	6^{2}	6	3
(Spain) L Arruabarrena	6	6
2	(Sweden) J Larsson	4	0

Semifinals
(Romania) PM Țig	1	2
(Spain) L Arruabarrena	6	6

== Qualifying ==
=== Seeds ===
1. (United States) Grace Min (moved to main draw)
2. (Thailand) Luksika Kumkhum (qualified)
3. (Japan) Eri Hozumi (qualified)
4. (Russia) Ksenia Lykina (second round)
5. (Chinese Taipei) Chang Kai-chen (qualifying competition)
6. (Poland) Urszula Radwańska (first round, retired)
7. (Japan) Riko Sawayanagi (second round)
8. (Netherlands) Arantxa Rus (qualified)
9. (Bulgaria) Aleksandrina Naydenova (first round)

=== Qualifiers ===
1. (Poland) Katarzyna Piter
2. (Thailand) Luksika Kumkhum
3. (Japan) Eri Hozumi
4. (Netherlands) Arantxa Rus

=== Draw ===
==== First qualifier ====
First round
9	(Bulgaria) Aleksandrina Naydenova	2	7	6^{6}
WC	(Georgia (country)) Oksana Kalashnikova	6	5	7^{8}
(Japan) Ayaka Okuno	6	3	0
(South Korea) Hong Seung-yeon	4	6	6
(Poland) Katarzyna Piter	6	6
WC	(South Korea) Park So-yeon	2	0
(South Korea) Han Sung-hee	4	4
7	(Japan) Riko Sawayanagi	6	6

Second round
WC	(Georgia (country)) Oksana Kalashnikova	6	6
(South Korea) Hong Seung-yeon	1	3
(Poland) Katarzyna Piter	6	6^{4}	6
7	(Japan) Riko Sawayanagi	3	7^{7}	2

Qualifying competition
WC	(Georgia (country)) Oksana Kalashnikova	3	5
(Poland) Katarzyna Piter	6	7

==== Second qualifier ====
First round
2	(Thailand) Luksika Kumkhum	6	6
(Japan) Kyōka Okamura	1	0
WC	(South Korea) Park Sang-hee	4	6	6
WC	(South Korea) Ahn Yu-jin	6	4	4
WC	(South Korea) Kwon Mi-jeong	2	5
(Thailand) Nicha Lertpitaksinchai	6	7
(Czech Republic) Renata Voráčová	6	0
6	(Poland) Urszula Radwańska	4	0^{r}

Second round
2	(Thailand) Luksika Kumkhum	6	6
WC	(South Korea) Park Sang-hee	2	0
(Thailand) Nicha Lertpitaksinchai	3	0
(Czech Republic) Renata Voráčová	6	6

Qualifying competition
2	(Thailand) Luksika Kumkhum	3	6	6
(Czech Republic) Renata Voráčová	6	4	4

==== Third qualifier ====
First round
3	(Japan) Eri Hozumi	6	6
(Poland) Magdalena Fręch	0	4
(South Korea) Kim Da-bin	4	3
WC	(South Korea) Lee Jin-ju	6	6
WC	(Indonesia) Hanna Levina	1	1
(Thailand) Peangtarn Plipuech	6	6
(United States) Tori Kinard	6	2	1
5	(Chinese Taipei) Chang Kai-chen	1	6	6

Second round
3	(Japan) Eri Hozumi	6	6
WC	(South Korea) Lee Jin-ju	0	0
(Thailand) Peangtarn Plipuech	1	5
5	(Chinese Taipei) Chang Kai-chen	6	7

Qualifying competition
3	(Japan) Eri Hozumi	6	6
5	(Chinese Taipei) Chang Kai-chen	3	4

==== Fourth qualifier ====
First round
4	(Russia) Ksenia Lykina	6	6
WC	(South Korea) Jang Eun-se	0	0
(United States) Jacqueline Cako	6	6
WC	(South Korea) Jeong Yeong-won	1	2
WC	(South Korea) Lim Eun-ji	1	0
(Japan) Akiko Omae	6	6
(Oman) Fatma Al-Nabhani	4	1
8	(Netherlands) Arantxa Rus	6	6

Second round
4	(Russia) Ksenia Lykina	6^{5}	6	4
(United States) Jacqueline Cako	7^{7}	4	6
(Japan) Akiko Omae	6	3	5
8	(Netherlands) Arantxa Rus	4	6	7

Qualifying competition
(United States) Jacqueline Cako	4	4
8	(Netherlands) Arantxa Rus	6	6
