= 2023 Kurume U.S.E Cup =

Tennis tournament

- Date: 15–21 May 2023
- Edition: 16th
- Category: ITF Women's World Tennis Tour
- Prize money: $60,000
- Surface: Grass / Outdoor
- Location: Kurume, Japan

Champions

Singles
- (United States) Emina Bektas

Doubles
- (Australia) Talia Gibson / (China) Wang Yafan
- Kurume Cup

The 2023 Kurume U.S.E Cup was a professional tennis tournament played on outdoor grass courts. It was the sixteenth edition of the tournament, which was part of the 2023 ITF Women's World Tennis Tour. It took place in Kurume, Japan, between 15 and 21 May 2023.

== Champions ==
=== Singles ===
- (United States) Emina Bektas def. (China) Ma Yexin, 7–5, 5–7, 6–1

=== Doubles ===
- (Australia) Talia Gibson / (China) Wang Yafan def. (Japan) Funa Kozaki / (Japan) Junri Namigata, 6–3, 6–3

== Singles main draw entrants ==
=== Seeds ===
Country	Player	Rank	Seed
USA	Emina Bektas	245	1
ISR	Lina Glushko	276	2
JPN	Haruka Kaji	278	3
AUS	Lizette Cabrera	279	4
TPE	Liang En-shuo	298	5
JPN	Rina Saigo	341	6
JPN	Momoko Kobori	352	7
CHN	Wang Yafan	355	8

- Rankings are as of 8 May 2023.

=== Other entrants ===
The following players received wildcards into the singles main draw:

- (Japan) Honoka Kobayashi
- (Japan) Miho Kuramochi
- (Japan) Himari Sato
- (Japan) Ai Yamaguchi

The following player received entry into the singles main draw using a special ranking:

- (Japan) Ayano Shimizu

The following player received entry into the singles main draw as a special exempt:

- (Japan) Natsumi Kawaguchi

The following players received entry from the qualifying draw:

- (Japan) Shiho Akita
- (Japan) Aoi Ito
- (United States) Rinko Matsuda
- (Japan) Mao Mushika
- (Japan) Junri Namigata
- (Japan) Lisa-Marie Rioux
- (Japan) Ramu Ueda
- (Japan) Mei Yamaguchi
