= Katy Dunne =

British tennis player (born 1995)

- Dunne at the 2026 Wimbledon Championships
- Country (sports): United Kingdom
- Born: 16 February 1995 (age 31) Hemel Hempstead
- Turned pro: 2013
- Retired: 2026
- Prize money: $386,371

Singles
- Career record: 298–233
- Career titles: 9 ITF
- Highest ranking: No. 212 (28 May 2018)

Grand Slam singles results
- Wimbledon: 1R (2018)
- US Open: Q1 (2018)

Doubles
- Career record: 115–106
- Career titles: 8 ITF
- Highest ranking: No. 135 (23 July 2018)
- Current ranking: No. 1,635 (16 November 2026)

Grand Slam doubles results
- Wimbledon: 2R (2018)

Grand Slam mixed doubles results
- Wimbledon: 1R (2017, 2018)

Katy Dunne (born 16 February 1995) is a British former professional tennis player.

Dunne has won nine singles and eight doubles titles on the ITF Circuit. On 28 May 2018, she reached her best singles ranking of world No. 212, and in July 2018, she peaked at No. 135 in the WTA doubles rankings.

Her brother, Conor Dunne, is a former professional cyclist and Irish road race national champion.

== Tennis career ==
In March 2016, Dunne won a major non-ITF title at Naremburn, Sydney. As the No. 2 seed, she defeated Shérazad Reix 6–3, 6–2 to claim the $3,200 first prize at the prestigious North Shore Open.

She made her WTA Tour main-draw debut at the 2014 Birmingham Classic. Having defeated the tenth and second seeds in qualifying, Alizé Lim and Tímea Babos, respectively, she faced world No. 44, Camila Giorgi, in the first round, but had to retire with a hip injury after only three games of the third set.

Dunne was later handed a wildcard to compete in the Wimbledon qualifying for the third year running, but lost in the first round to the two-time quarterfinalist Tamira Paszek, in straight sets. In 2018, she was handed a wildcard into the Wimbledon main draw where she played on centre court against Jelena Ostapenko, pushing the 12th seed to a tie break, before losing in two sets. In 2019, Dunne won a $60k tournament in Spain and picked up an injury shortly after that.

Dunne announced her retirement from professional tennis in June 2026.

== ITF Circuit finals ==
=== Singles: 16 (9 titles, 7 runner-ups) ===
Legend W60 tournaments (1–0) W25/35 tournaments (1–6) W10/15 tournaments (7–1)	Finals by surface Hard (8–7) Carpet (1–0)

Result	W–L	Date	Tournament	Tier	Surface	Opponent	Score
Win	1–0	Nov 2013	ITF Rethymno, Greece	10k	Hard	(Netherlands) Lisanne van Riet	6–3, 6–4
Win	2–0	Dec 2013	ITF Sharm El Sheikh, Egypt	10k	Hard	(Belgium) Klaartje Liebens	6–3, 6–0
Win	3–0	Jul 2014	ITF Imola, Italy	15k	Carpet	(Israel) Deniz Khazaniuk	6–1, 6–3
Loss	3–1	Dec 2014	ITF Pune, India	25k	Hard	(India) Ankita Raina	2–6, 2–6
Win	4–1	Aug 2015	ITF Chiswick, United Kingdom	10k	Hard	(United Kingdom) Emily Arbuthnott	6–3, 6–3
Loss	4–2	Aug 2015	ITF Woking, United Kingdom	25k	Hard	(Switzerland) Viktorija Golubic	4–6, 4–6
Loss	4–3	Oct 2016	ITF Toowoomba, Australia	25k	Hard	(Hungary) Dalma Gálfi	2–6, 4–6
Win	5–3	Sep 2017	ITF Kyoto, Japan	15k	Hard (i)	(Japan) Michika Ozeki	6–2, 7–6^{(2)}
Loss	5–4	Dec 2017	ITF Pune, India	25k	Hard	(Spain) Georgina García Pérez	4–6, 5–7
Loss	5–5	Feb 2018	ITF Perth, Australia	25k	Hard	(Russia) Irina Khromacheva	2–6, 3–6
Win	6–5	May 2019	ITF Les Franqueses del Valles, Spain	W60	Hard	(Spain) Paula Badosa	7–5, 6–3
Win	7–5	Dec 2022	ITF Sharm El Sheikh, Egypt	W15	Hard	(Egypt) Lamis Alhussein Abdel Aziz	6–2, 6–2
Win	8–5	Dec 2022	ITF Sharm El Sheikh, Egypt	W15	Hard	(France) Nahia Berecoechea	6–3, 6–2
Win	9–5	Aug 2023	ITF Foxhills, United Kingdom	W25	Hard	(Australia) Talia Gibson	6–4, 3–6, 6–4
Loss	9–6	May 2025	ITF Monastir, Tunisia	W15	Hard	Ekaterina Khayrutdinova]	1–6, 2–6
Loss	9–7	Dec 2025	ITF Sharm El Sheikh, Egypt	W35	Hard	(United States) Hibah Shaikh	5–7, 0–6

=== Doubles: 18 (8 titles, 10 runner-ups) ===
Legend W80 tournaments (0–1) W60/75 tournaments (1–2) W25/35 tournaments (1–5) W10/15 tournaments (6–2)	Finals by surface Hard (5–9) Grass (1–0) Carpet (2–1)

Result	W–L	Date	Tournament	Tier	Surface	Partner	Opponents	Score
Win	1–0	Nov 2013	ITF Rethymno, Greece	10k	Hard	(United Kingdom) Sarah Beth Askew	(Russia) Margarita Lazareva (Netherlands) Lisanne van Riet	2–6, 6–4, [10–5]
Win	2–0	Dec 2013	ITF Sharm El Sheikh, Egypt	10k	Hard	(United Kingdom) Harriet Dart	(Hungary) Csilla Borsányi (Russia) Aminat Kushkhova	0–6, 6–4, [10–4]
Loss	2–1	Dec 2013	ITF Sharm El Sheikh	10k	Hard	(United Kingdom) Harriet Dart	(South Korea) Kim Hae-sung (South Korea) Kim Ju-eun	6–7^{(6)}, 4–6
Loss	2–2	Apr 2014	ITF Gloucester, UK	10k	Hard (i)	(United Kingdom) Sarah Beth Askew	(United Kingdom) Lucy Brown (Sweden) Hilda Melander	5–7, 3–6
Win	3–2	14 April 2014	ITF Sharm El Sheikh	10k	Hard	(Russia) Anna Morgina	(China) Dong Xiaorong (Austria) Pia König	7–5, 7–6^{(5)}
Win	4–2	Apr 2014	ITF Sharm El Sheikh	10k	Hard	(United Kingdom) Harriet Dart	(Japan) Yuka Mori (United Kingdom) Eden Silva	6–4, 6–4
Win	5–2	Jul 2014	ITF Imola, Italy	15k	Carpet	(United Kingdom) Katie Boulter	(Italy) Anna Remondina (Switzerland) Lisa Sabino	7–6^{(8)}, 6–3
Win	6–2	Aug 2015	ITF Chiswick, UK	10k	Hard	(United Kingdom) Harriet Dart	(United Kingdom) Emily Arbuthnott (United Kingdom) Freya Christie	6–2, 6–2
Loss	6–3	Aug 2015	ITF Woking, UK	25k	Hard	(United Kingdom) Harriet Dart	(Italy) Claudia Giovine (Greece) Despina Papamichail	2–6, 1–6
Loss	6–4	Dec 2016	ITF Pune, India	25k	Hard	(Thailand) Kamonwan Buayam	(Indonesia) Beatrice Gumulya (Montenegro) Ana Veselinović	4–6, 3–6
Loss	6–5	May 2017	Kangaroo Cup, Japan	80k	Hard	(Israel) Julia Glushko	(Japan) Eri Hozumi (Japan) Miyu Kato	4–6, 2–6
Win	7–5	May 2017	Kurume Cup, Japan	60k	Carpet	(Australia) Tammi Patterson	(Japan) Erina Hayashi (Japan) Robu Kajitani	6–7^{(3)}, 6–2, [10–4]
Loss	7–6	Aug 2017	ITF Chiswick, UK	25k	Hard	(Bulgaria) Elitsa Kostova	(Romania) Laura Ioana Andrei (Germany) Julia Wachaczyk	5–7, 5–7
Win	8–6	Mar 2018	ITF Mildura, Australia	25k	Grass	(United Kingdom) Gabriella Taylor	(Australia) Alexandra Bozovic (Australia) Olivia Tjandramulia	5–7, 7–6^{(4)}, [10–5]
Loss	8–7	May 2018	Kurume Cup, Japan	60k	Carpet	(Papua New Guinea) Abigail Tere-Apisah	(United Kingdom) Naomi Broady (United States) Asia Muhammad	2–6, 4–6
Loss	8–8	Sep 2018	Darwin International, Australia	60k	Hard	(Australia) Kimberly Birrell	(Japan) Hiroko Kuwata (India) Rutuja Bhosale	2–6, 4–6
Loss	8–9	Dec 2023	ITF Limassol, Cyprus	W25	Hard	(Switzerland) Leonie Küng	Anastasiia Gureva; Polina Iatcenko	walkover
Loss	8–10	Jan 2024	ITF Monastir, Tunisia	W35	Hard	(United Kingdom) Madeleine Brooks	(Slovakia) Katarína Kužmová (Slovakia) Nina Vargová	4–6, 3–6
