= Lara Arruabarrena =

Spanish tennis player (born 1992)

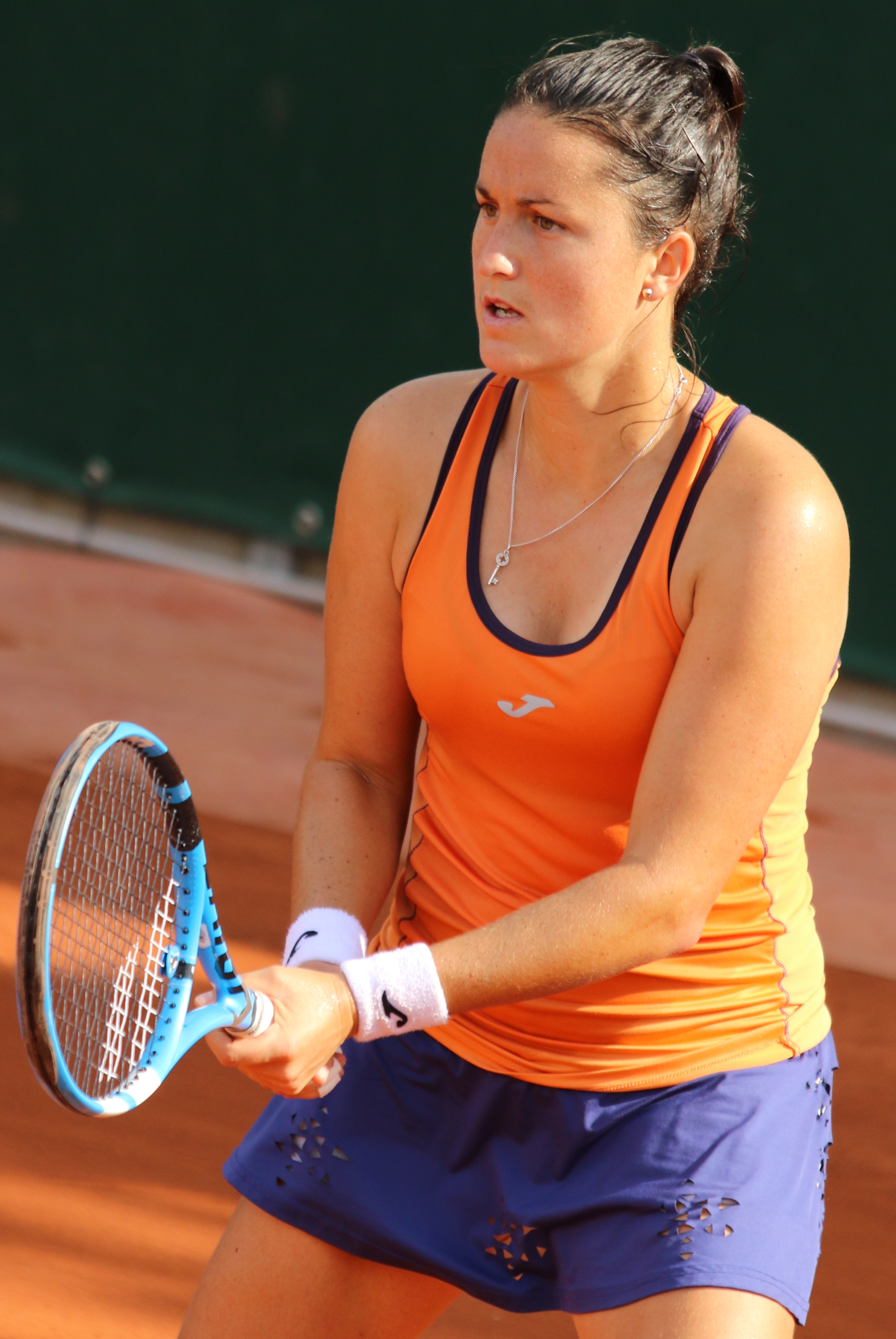
- Arruabarrena at the 2018 French Open
- Full name: Lara Arruabarrena Vecino
- Country (sports): Spain
- Residence: Barcelona, Spain
- Born: 20 March 1992 (age 34) Tolosa, Spain
- Height: 1.66 m (5 ft 5 in)
- Turned pro: 2007
- Retired: 2022
- Plays: Right (two-handed backhand)
- Coach: Andoni Vivanco
- Prize money: US$ 3,362,484

Singles
- Career record: 364–291
- Career titles: 2
- Highest ranking: No. 52 (3 July 2017)

Grand Slam singles results
- Australian Open: 2R (2015, 2016, 2018)
- French Open: 2R (2018)
- Wimbledon: 2R (2015, 2016, 2018)
- US Open: 2R (2012, 2018)

Doubles
- Career record: 210–168
- Career titles: 8
- Highest ranking: No. 28 (22 February 2016)

Grand Slam doubles results
- Australian Open: 3R (2020)
- French Open: QF (2018)
- Wimbledon: 2R (2015, 2017, 2018)
- US Open: QF (2015)

Team competitions
- Fed Cup: 3–5

Lara Arruabarrena Vecino (Spanish pronunciation: [ˈlaɾa arwaβaˈrena βeˈθino]; (Note: In isolation, Vecino is pronounced [beˈθino].) born 20 March 1992) is a former professional tennis player from Spain. On 3 July 2017, she reached a career-high WTA singles ranking of 52, and her best doubles ranking is world No. 28, achieved on 22 February 2016.

Over her career, she won two singles and eight doubles titles on the WTA Tour. Arruabarrena retired from professional tour in August 2022.

== Personal life and background ==
Arruabarrena is coached by Andoni Vivanco. Her father, Juan, is a lithographer, and her mother, Blanca, is a nurse. She also has one younger sister. Arruabarrena started playing tennis at age eight when she took lessons with a friend for fun. She stated that her favourite surface is clay. When she was 15, she moved to Barcelona to train with Spanish Federation. Her tennis idol growing up was Justine Henin.

== Career ==
Arruabarrena made her debut appearance on the ITF Circuit at Les Francqueses del Valles, France, where she lost in first round against her compatriot Lucia Cervera-Vazquez, in straight-sets.

In July 2008, she won her first ITF title on a $10k event in Oviedo. In the final, she defeated Hermon Brhane, in straight sets.

Arruabarrena made her WTA Tour main-draw debut as a qualifier at the 2011 Andalucia Tennis Experience, defeating Monica Niculescu and Sandra Záhlavová, before losing to second seed Svetlana Kuznetsova.

She won her first WTA Tour title at the 2012 Copa Colsanitas in Bogotá, beating Alexandra Panova in the final.

Arruabarrena claimed her second career trophy at the 2016 Korea Open, overcoming Monica Niculescu in the final in three sets.

She reached the final of the 2017 Copa Colsanitas, losing to wildcard entrant Francesca Schiavone. Arruabarrena was also runner-up at the 2018 Copa Colsanitas, losing in the final to Anna Karolína Schmiedlová.

Having not played since 2022 Australian Open, she announced her retirement from tennis in August that year.

== Performance timelines ==
Key
W	F	SF	QF	#R	RR	Q#	DNQ	A	NH

(W) winner; (F) finalist; (SF) semifinalist; (QF) quarterfinalist; (#R) rounds 4, 3, 2, 1; (RR) round-robin stage; (Q#) qualification round; (DNQ) did not qualify; (A) absent; (NH) not held; (SR) strike rate (events won / competed); (W–L) win–loss record.
To avoid confusion and double counting, these charts are updated at the conclusion of a tournament or when the player's participation has ended.

Only main-draw results in WTA Tour, Grand Slam tournaments, Fed Cup/Billie Jean King Cup and Olympic Games are included in win–loss records.

=== Singles ===
Tournament	2011	2012	2013	2014	2015	2016	2017	2018	2019	2020	2021	2022	SR	W–L	Win %
Grand Slam tournaments
Australian Open	A	A	1R	1R	2R	2R	1R	2R	1R	Q3	Q1	Q1	0 / 7	3–7	30%
French Open	A	1R	A	Q1	1R	1R	1R	2R	A	Q1	1R	A	0 / 6	1–6	14%
Wimbledon	A	A	1R	Q1	2R	2R	1R	2R	A	NH	Q1	A	0 / 5	3–5	38%
US Open	A	2R	1R	Q3	1R	1R	1R	2R	Q2	A	Q2	A	0 / 6	2–6	25%
Win–loss	0–0	1–2	0–3	0–1	2–4	2–4	0–4	4–4	0–1	0–0	0–1	0–0	0 / 24	9–24	27%
WTA 1000
Dubai / Qatar Open (Note: The first Premier 5 event of the year has switched back and forth between the Dubai Tennis Championships and the Qatar Ladies Open since 2009. Dubai was classified as a Premier 5 event from 2009 to 2011 before being succeeded by Doha for the 2012–2014 period. In 2015, Dubai regained its Premier 5 status while Doha was demoted to Premier status. The Premier 5 tournaments were reclassified as WTA 1000 tournaments in 2021.)	A	A	A	A	A	A	1R	A	1R	A	A	A	0 / 2	0–2	0%
Indian Wells Open	A	A	4R	Q1	2R	A	1R	2R	Q1	NH	A	A	0 / 4	5–4	56%
Miami Open	A	Q1	Q1	A	A	Q2	4R	1R	Q1	NH	A	A	0 / 2	3–2	60%
Madrid Open	A	1R	A	2R	1R	1R	3R	2R	1R	NH	A	A	0 / 7	4–7	36%
Italian Open	A	A	A	A	A	Q2	Q1	Q1	A	A	A	A	0 / 0	0–0	–
Canadian Open	A	A	Q2	A	Q2	A	1R	A		NH	A	A	0 / 1	0–1	0%
Cincinnati Open	A	A	Q1	A	Q1	Q1	Q1	Q1	A	A	A	A	0 / 0	0–0	–
Pan Pacific / Wuhan Open (Note: In 2014, the Pan Pacific Open was downgraded to a Premier event and replaced by the Wuhan Open. The Premier 5 tournaments were reclassified as WTA 1000 tournaments in 2021.)	A	Q1	A	A	A	A	Q1	Q1	A	NH		A	0 / 0	0–0	–
China Open	A	2R	A	A	2R	1R	2R	Q2	A	NH		A	0 / 4	3–4	43%
Career statistics
Tournaments	2	8	11	11	17	17	19	19	12	1	5	0	Career total: 122		
Titles	0	1	0	0	0	1	0	0	0	0	0	0	Career total: 2		
Finals	0	1	0	0	0	1	1	1	0	0	0	0	Career total: 4		
Overall win–loss	3–2	8–7	8–11	10–11	15–17	16–16	14–21	13–21	8–12	0–1	3–5	0–0	2 / 120	98–124	44%
Year-end ranking	167	77	100	88	86	69	84	84	157	164	219	-	$3,148,327		

=== Doubles ===
Tournament	2013	2014	2015	2016	2017	2018	2019	2020	2021	2022	SR	W–L	Win %
Grand Slam tournaments
Australian Open	1R	A	2R	1R	1R	2R	1R	3R	1R	A	0 / 8	4–8	33%
French Open	A	A	2R	1R	1R	QF	A	1R	2R	A	0 / 6	6–6	50%
Wimbledon	1R	A	2R	1R	2R	2R	A	NH	1R	A	0 / 6	3–6	33%
US Open	A	A	QF	2R	2R	1R	1R	A	A	A	0 / 5	5–5	50%
Win–loss	0–2	0–0	6–4	1–4	2–4	5–4	0–2	2–2	2–3	0–0	0 / 25	18–25	42%
WTA 1000
Dubai / Qatar Open	A	A	A	A	A	A	SF	A	A	A	0 / 1	3–1	75%
Indian Wells Open	A	A	1R	A	QF	QF	1R	NH	A	A	0 / 4	4–4	50%
Miami Open	A	A	A	1R	2R	2R	2R	NH	A	A	0 / 4	3–4	43%
Madrid Open	A	A	QF	2R	2R	1R	A	NH	A	A	0 / 4	4–4	50%
Italian Open	A	A	A	2R	2R	1R	A	A	A	A	0 / 3	2–3	40%
Canadian Open	A	A	A	A	A	A	A	NH	A	A	0 / 0	0–0	–
Cincinnati Open	A	A	1R	1R	A	1R	A	A	A	A	0 / 3	0–3	0%
Pan Pacific / Wuhan Open	A	A	1R	1R	A	1R	A	NH		A	0 / 7	3–7	30%
China Open	A	A	2R	QF	A	2R	A	NH		A	0 / 3	4–3	57%
Career statistics
Year-end ranking	106	64	31	61	78	39	52	83	137	-			

== WTA Tour finals ==
=== Singles: 4 (2 titles, 2 runner-ups) ===
Legend WTA 500 WTA 250 (2–2)	Finals by surface Hard (1–0) Clay (1–2)

Result	W–L	Date	Tournament	Tier	Surface	Opponent	Score
Win	1–0	Feb 2012	Copa Colsanitas, Colombia	International	Clay	(Russia) Alexandra Panova	6–2, 7–5
Win	2–0	Sep 2016	Korea Open, South Korea	International	Hard	(Romania) Monica Niculescu	6–0, 2–6, 6–0
Loss	2–1	Apr 2017	Copa Colsanitas, Colombia	International	Clay	(Italy) Francesca Schiavone	4–6, 5–7
Loss	2–2	Apr 2018	Copa Colsanitas, Colombia	International	Clay	(Slovakia) Anna Karolína Schmiedlová	2–6, 4–6

=== Doubles: 14 (8 titles, 6 runner-ups) ===
Legend WTA 500 WTA 250 (8–6)	Finals by surface Hard (4–3) Clay (4–3)

Result	W–L	Date	Tournament	Tier	Surface	Partner	Opponents	Score
Win	1–0	Apr 2013	Katowice Open, Poland	International	Clay (i)	(Spain) Lourdes Domínguez Lino	(Romania) Raluca Olaru (Russia) Valeria Solovyeva	6–4, 7–5
Win	2–0	Apr 2014	Copa Colsanitas, Colombia	International	Clay	(France) Caroline Garcia	(United States) Vania King (South Africa) Chanelle Scheepers	7–6^{(7–5)}, 6–4
Win	3–0	Sep 2014	Korea Open, South Korea	International	Hard	(Romania) Irina-Camelia Begu	(Germany) Mona Barthel (Luxembourg) Mandy Minella	6–3, 6–3
Loss	3–1	Oct 2014	Japan Women's Open	International	Hard	(Germany) Tatjana Maria	(Japan) Shuko Aoyama (Czech Republic) Renata Voráčová	1–6, 2–6
Win	4–1	Feb 2015	Abierto Mexicano, Mexico	International	Hard	(Spain) María Teresa Torró Flor	(Czech Republic) Andrea Hlaváčková (Czech Republic) Lucie Hradecká	7–6^{(7–2)}, 5–7, [13–11]
Loss	4–2	May 2015	Nuremberg Cup, Germany	International	Clay	(Romania) Raluca Olaru	(Chinese Taipei) Chan Hao-ching (Spain) Anabel Medina Garrigues	4–6, 6–7^{(5–7)}
Loss	4–3	Jul 2015	Gastein Ladies, Austria	International	Clay	(Czech Republic) Lucie Hradecká	(Montenegro) Danka Kovinić (Liechtenstein) Stephanie Vogt	6–4, 4–6, [3–10]
Loss	4–4	Aug 2015	Washington Open, United States	International	Hard	(Slovenia) Andreja Klepač	(Switzerland) Belinda Bencic (France) Kristina Mladenovic	5–7, 6–7^{(7–9)}
Win	5–4	Sep 2015	Korea Open, South Korea (2)	International	Hard	(Slovenia) Andreja Klepač	(Netherlands) Kiki Bertens (Sweden) Johanna Larsson	2–6, 6–3, [10–6]
Loss	5–5	Oct 2015	Hong Kong Open, China SAR	International	Hard	(Slovenia) Andreja Klepač	(France) Alizé Cornet (Kazakhstan) Yaroslava Shvedova	5–7, 4–6
Win	6–5	Apr 2016	Copa Colsanitas, Colombia (2)	International	Clay	(Germany) Tatjana Maria	(Brazil) Gabriela Cé (Venezuela) Andrea Gámiz	6–2, 4–6, [10–8]
Win	7–5	Jul 2016	Ladies Championship Gstaad, Suisse	International	Clay	(Switzerland) Xenia Knoll	(Germany) Annika Beck (Russia) Evgeniya Rodina	6–1, 3–6, [10–8]
Loss	7–6	Jul 2018	Ladies Championship; Gstaad, Switzerland	International	Clay	(Switzerland) Timea Bacsinszky	(Chile) Alexa Guarachi (United States) Desirae Krawczyk	6–4, 4–6, [6–10]
Win	8–6	Sep 2019	Korea Open, South Korea (3)	International	Hard	(Germany) Tatjana Maria	(United States) Hayley Carter (Brazil) Luisa Stefani	7–6^{(9–7)}, 3–6, [10–7]

== WTA 125 finals ==
=== Singles: 1 (title) ===
Result	W–L	Date	Tournament	Surface	Opponent	Score
Win	1–0	Feb 2013	Copa Bionaire, Colombia	Clay	(Colombia) Catalina Castaño	6–3, 6–2

=== Doubles: 1 (title) ===
Result	W–L	Date	Tournament	Surface	Partner	Opponents	Score
Win	1–0	Aug 2019	Karlsruhe Open, Germany	Clay	(Czech Republic) Renata Voráčová	(China) Han Xinyun (China) Yuan Yue	6–7^{(2–7)}, 6–4, [10–4]

== ITF Circuit finals ==
Legend
$100,000 tournaments
$50,000 tournaments
$25,000 tournaments
$10,000 tournaments

=== Singles: 14 (12 titles, 2 runner-ups) ===
Result	W–L	Date	Tournament	Tier	Surface	Opponent	Score
Win	1–0	Jul 2008	ITF Oviedo, Spain	10,000	Hard	(Germany) Hermon Brhane	7–6^{(7–2)}, 6–4
Loss	1–1	Oct 2008	ITF Sant Cugat del Vallès, Spain	10,000	Clay	(Spain) Eva Fernández Brugués	4–6, 6–7
Win	2–1	Apr 2009	ITF Torrent, Spain	10,000	Clay	(Spain) Marta Marrero	6–2, 6–3
Win	3–1	Sep 2009	ITF Lleida, Spain	10,000	Clay	(Romania) Diana Enache	6–3, 5–7, 6–2
Win	4–1	Oct 2009	ITF Seville, Spain	10,000	Clay	(Serbia) Neda Kozić	6–1, 6–2
Win	5–1	May 2010	ITF Badalona, Spain	10,000	Clay	(Ukraine) Yevgeniya Kryvoruchko	6–4, 6–3
Win	6–1	Nov 2010	ITF Mallorca, Spain	10,000	Clay	(Spain) Sandra Soler Sola	6–3, 6–3
Win	7–1	Nov 2010	ITF Mallorca, Spain	10,000	Clay	(Portugal) Maria João Koehler	7–6^{(7–2)}, 6–3
Win	8–1	Nov 2010	ITF Vallduxo, Spain	10,000	Clay	(Russia) Nanuli Pipiya	7–5, 7–6^{(8–6)}
Win	9–1	Dec 2010	ITF Vinaròs, Spain	10,000	Clay	(Romania) Cristina Dinu	6–2, 6–0
Win	10–1	Feb 2011	ITF Mallorca, Spain	10,000	Clay	(Switzerland) Conny Perrin	6–1, 6–2
Win	11–1	Mar 2011	ITF Madrid, Spain	10,000	Clay	(Spain) Leticia Costas	6–4, 6–2
Win	12–1	Aug 2014	Open Bogotá, Colombia	100,000	Clay	(Sweden) Johanna Larsson	6–1, 6–3
Loss	12–2	Apr 2016	Osprey Challenger, US	50,000	Hard	(United States) Madison Brengle	6–4, 4–6, 3–6

=== Doubles: 15 (9 titles, 6 runner-ups) ===
Result	W–L	Date	Tournament	Tier	Surface	Partner	Opponents	Score
Loss	0–1	Apr 2009	ITF Torrent, Spain	10,000	Clay	(Spain) Carla Roset Franco	(Italy) Martina Caciotti (Italy) Nicole Clerico	6–7, 6–0, [9–11]
Win	1–1	Sep 2009	ITF Mollerussa, Spain	10,000	Hard	(Spain) Carla Roset Franco	(Argentina) Tatiana Búa (Spain) Inés Ferrer Suárez	6–3, 2–6, [10–6]
Win	2–1	Nov 2009	ITF Vallduxo, Spain	10,000	Clay	(United Kingdom) Amanda Carreras	(Spain) Yera Campos Molina (Spain) Sandra Soler Sola	6–4, 3–6, [11–9]
Win	3–1	Jul 2010	ITF Mont-de-Marsan, France	25,000	Clay	(Spain) Inés Ferrer Suárez	(Ukraine) Nadiia Kichenok (France) Constance Sibille	6–3, 6–1
Loss	3–2	Aug 2010	ITF Koksijde, Belgium	25,000	Clay	(Spain) María Teresa Torró Flor	(Italy) Nicole Clerico (Germany) Justine Ozga	7–5, 4–6, [6–10]
Win	4–2	Oct 2010	Open Villa de Madrid, Spain	50,000	Clay	(Spain) María Teresa Torró Flor	(Romania) Irina-Camelia Begu (Romania) Elena Bogdan	6–4, 7–5
Win	5–2	Nov 2010	ITF Mallorca, Spain	10,000	Clay	(Spain) Inés Ferrer Suárez	(Portugal) Maria João Koehler (Russia) Avgusta Tsybysheva	7–5, 6–2
Loss	5–3	Nov 2010	ITF Vallduxo, Spain	10,000	Clay	(Italy) Benedetta Davato	(United Kingdom) Amanda Carreras (Venezuela) Andrea Gámiz	6–7^{(5)}, 3–6
Win	6–3	Sep 2011	Internazionale di Biella, Italy	100,000	Clay	(Russia) Ekaterina Lopes	(Slovakia) Janette Husárová (Czech Republic) Renata Voráčová	6–3, 0–6, [10–3]
Win	7–3	Oct 2011	ITF Seville, Spain	25,000	Clay	(Spain) Estrella Cabeza Candela	(Spain) Leticia Costas (Spain) Inés Ferrer Suárez	6–4, 6–4
Loss	7–4	Jul 2012	Open de Biarritz, France	100,000	Clay	(Puerto Rico) Monica Puig	(France) Séverine Beltrame (France) Laura Thorpe	2–6, 3–6
Loss	7–5	Oct 2013	ITF Sant Cugat del Vallès, Spain	25,000	Clay	(United Kingdom) Amanda Carreras	(Argentina) Tatiana Búa (Venezuela) Andrea Gámiz	6–4, 2–6, [7–10]
Loss	7–6	May 2014	Grado Tennis Cup, Italy	25,000	Clay	(Argentina) Florencia Molinero	(Paraguay) Verónica Cepede Royg (Liechtenstein) Stephanie Vogt	4–6, 2–6
Win	8–6	Aug 2014	Open Bogotá, Colombia	100,000	Clay	(Argentina) Florencia Molinero	(Austria) Melanie Klaffner (Austria) Patricia Mayr-Achleitner	6–2, 6–0
Win	9–6	Oct 2019	ITF Riba-roja de Túria, Spain	25,000	Clay	(Italy) Sara Errani	(Belgium) Marie Benoît (Romania) Ioana Loredana Roșca	3–6, 6–4, [10–8]

== Junior Grand Slam tournament finals ==
=== Doubles: 1 (runner-up) ===
Result	Year	Tournament	Surface	Partner	Opponents	Score
Loss	2010	French Open	Clay	(Spain) María Teresa Torró Flor	(Hungary) Tímea Babos (United States) Sloane Stephens	2–6, 3–6

== Wins over top 10 players ==
#	Player	Rank	Event	Surface	Round	Score
2015
1.	(Romania) Simona Halep	No. 2	China Open	Hard	1R	5–4 ret.
2017
2.	(United States) Madison Keys	No. 9	Miami Open	Hard	3R	7–5, 7–5
3.	(Russia) Svetlana Kuznetsova	No. 8	China Open	Hard	1R	6–7^{(2)}, 7–5, 6–1
