= Akiko Omae =

Japanese tennis player (born 1993)

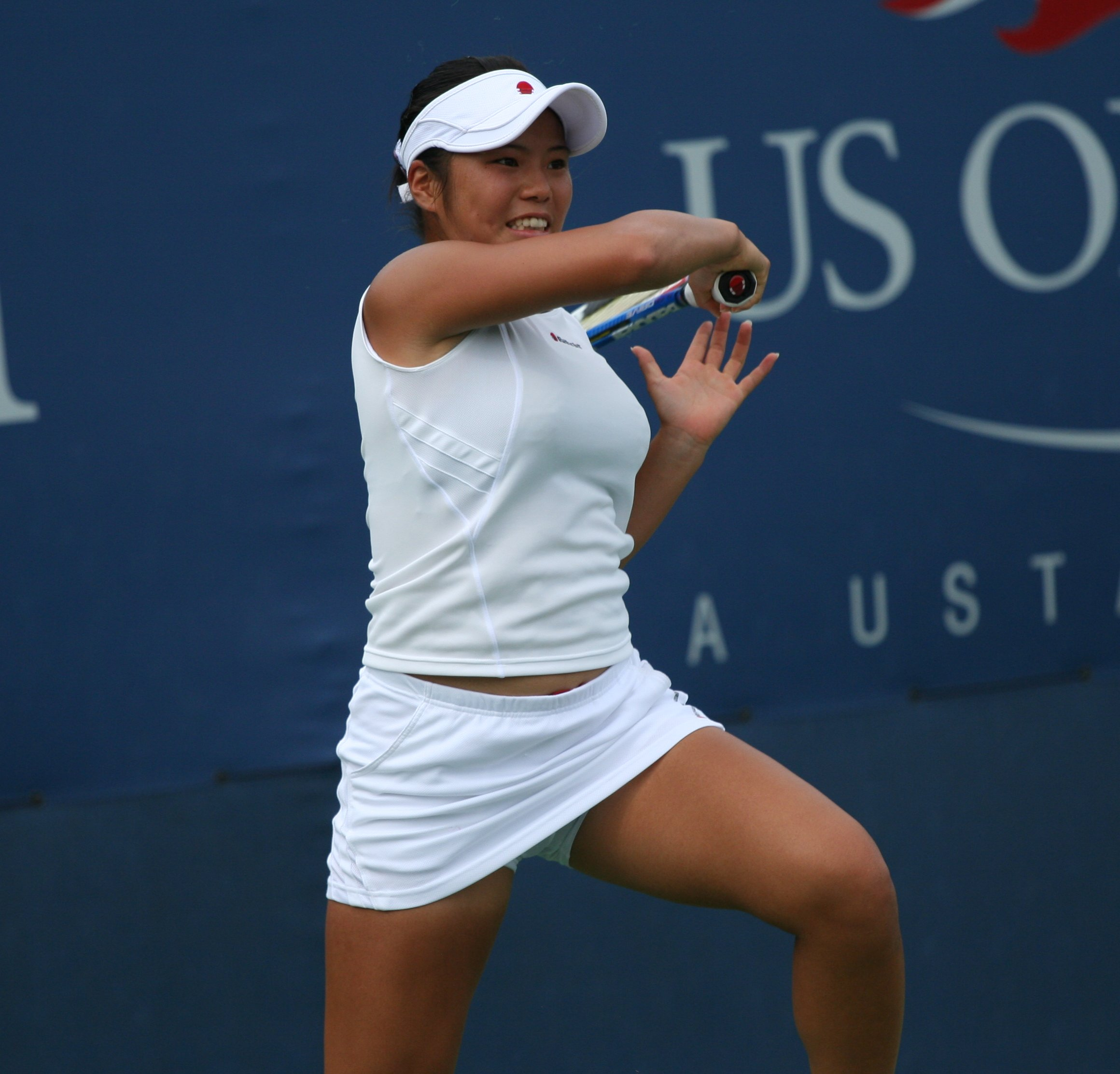
- Omae at the 2009 US Open
- Native name: 大前 綾希子
- Country (sports): Japan
- Born: 29 January 1993 (age 33) Kyoto, Japan
- Height: 1.62 m (5 ft 4 in)
- Turned pro: 2011
- Retired: 2025
- Plays: Right (two-handed backhand)
- Coach: Kentaro Masuda
- Prize money: $252,471

Singles
- Career record: 352–299
- Career titles: 7 ITF
- Highest ranking: No. 188 (3 April 2017)

Grand Slam singles results
- Australian Open: Q1 (2013, 2021)
- French Open: Q1 (2017)
- Wimbledon: Q2 (2017)

Doubles
- Career record: 356–223
- Career titles: 25 ITF
- Highest ranking: No. 95 (21 November 2016)

Grand Slam doubles results
- Wimbledon: 1R (2017)

Akiko Omae (大前 綾希子, Ōmae Akiko; born 29 January 1993) is a Japanese former tennis player.

On 3 April 2017, she reached her best singles ranking of world No. 188. On 21 November 2016, she peaked at No. 95 in the doubles rankings. Omae has won seven titles in singles and twenty-five in doubles on the ITF Circuit.

Her biggest title for Omae to date was when she won the doubles event at the 2015 Dunlop World Challenge, partnering with Peangtarn Plipuech.

Omae announced her retirement from professional tennis in September 2025.

== WTA Tour finals ==
=== Doubles: 1 (runner-up) ===
Legend Premier International (0–1)	Finals by surface Hard (0–1) Clay (0–0)

Result	Date	Tournament	Tier	Surface	Partner	Opponents	Score
Loss	Sep 2016	Korea Open, South Korea	International	Hard	(Thailand) Peangtarn Plipuech	(Belgium) Kirsten Flipkens (Sweden) Johanna Larsson	2–6, 3–6

== ITF Circuit finals ==
=== Singles: 11 (7 titles, 4 runner-ups) ===
Legend $25,000 tournaments $10/15,000 tournaments	Finals by surface Hard (7–4)

Result	W–L	Date	Tournament	Tier	Surface	Opponent	Score
Win	1–0	Jun 2011	ITF Tokyo, Japan	10,000	Hard	(Japan) Misa Eguchi	6–3, 6–4
Win	2–0	Jul 2011	ITF Pattaya, Thailand	25,000	Hard	(Japan) Sachie Ishizu	7–5, 6–2
Loss	2–1	Sep 2011	Darwin International, Australia	25,000	Hard	(Australia) Casey Dellacqua	1–6, 2–6
Loss	2–2	Jun 2014	ITF Taipei, Taiwan	10,000	Hard	(Chinese Taipei) Lee Ya-hsuan	3–6, 2–6
Loss	2–3	Jan 2015	ITF Hong Kong	10,000	Hard	(Japan) Mizuno Kijima	2–6, 1–6
Win	3–3	Jun 2016	ITF Tokyo, Japan	25,000	Hard	(South Korea) Jang Su-jeong	6–2, 6–1
Win	4–3	Aug 2016	ITF Nonthaburi, Thailand	25,000	Hard	(Russia) Olga Doroshina	7–6^{(6)}, 6–4
Win	5–3	Mar 2017	Keio Challenger, Japan	25,000	Hard	(Japan) Mayo Hibi	7–5, 6–2
Loss	5–4	May 2019	ITF Wuhan, China	25,000	Hard	(China) Yuan Yue	3–6, 6–7^{(6)}
Win	6–4	Aug 2019	ITF Tsukuba, Japan	25,000	Hard	(Japan) Haruka Kaji	0–6, 7–6^{(5)}, 6–3
Win	7–4	Jun 2024	ITF Tokyo, Japan	15,000	Hard	(Japan) Hiromi Abe	6–2, 7–6^{(2)}

=== Doubles: 50 (25 titles, 25 runner-ups) ===
Legend W100 tournaments W75/80 tournaments W50/60 tournaments W25/35 tournaments W15 tournaments W10 tournaments	Finals by surface Hard (20–16) Clay (1–4) Grass (0–3) Carpet (4–2)

Result	No.	Date	Tournament	Surface	Partner	Opponents	Score
Loss	1.	27 June 2011	ITF Pattaya, Thailand	Hard	(Japan) Misa Eguchi	(China) Liang Chen (China) Zhao Yijing	3–6, 4–6
Loss	2.	7 May 2012	Fukuoka International, Japan	Grass	(Japan) Misa Eguchi	(Australia) Monique Adamczak (Australia) Stephanie Bengson	4–6, 4–6
Win	1.	22 October 2012	ITF Florence, United States	Hard	(Norway) Ulrikke Eikeri	(United States) Brooke Austin (United States) Hayley Carter	6–1, 6–1
Loss	3.	12 May 2013	Fukuoka International, Japan	Grass	(Japan) Rika Fujiwara	(Japan) Junri Namigata (Japan) Erika Sema	5–7, 6–3, [7–10]
Loss	4.	12 May 2013	Kurume Cup, Japan	Grass	(Japan) Rika Fujiwara	(Japan) Kanae Hisami (Japan) Mari Tanaka	4–6, 6–7^{(2–7)}
Win	2.	20 May 2013	ITF Goyang, Korea	Hard	(Japan) Nao Hibino	(South Korea) Yoo Mi (South Korea) Han Na-lae	6–4, 6–4
Win	3.	9 September 2013	Incheon Open, Korea	Hard	(Japan) Miki Miyamura	(Thailand) Nicha Lertpitaksinchai (Thailand) Peangtarn Plipuech	6–4, 6–7^{(6)}, [11–9]
Loss	5.	8 June 2014	ITF Tokyo, Japan	Hard	(Japan) Yurina Koshino	(Japan) Mana Ayukawa (Japan) Makoto Ninomiya	6–3, 4–6, [4–10]
Loss	6.	21 June 2014	ITF Taipei, Taiwan	Hard	(Japan) Mai Minokoshi	(Chinese Taipei) Kao Shao-yuan (Chinese Taipei) Lee Pei-chi	1–6, 4–6
Win	4.	4 July 2014	ITF Bangkok, Thailand	Hard	(Japan) Miyu Kato	(Thailand) Kamonwan Buayam (Thailand) Nungnadda Wannasuk	6–0, 6–0
Win	5.	28 July 2014	ITF Istanbul, Turkey	Hard	(Japan) Mai Minokoshi	(China) Gao Xinyu (China) You Xiaodi	3–6, 6–2, [10–4]
Win	6.	7 September 2014	ITF Antalya, Turkey	Hard	(Japan) Kotomi Takahata	(Japan) Yumi Nakano (United Kingdom) Eden Silva	7–5, 6–2
Win	7.	13 September 2014	ITF Antalya, Turkey	Hard	(Japan) Kotomi Takahata	(Thailand) Varunya Wongteanchai (Thailand) Nungnadda Wannasuk	6–4, 6–2
Loss	7.	30 March 2015	ITF Bangkok, Thailand	Clay	(Japan) Miyabi Inoue	(Japan) Nao Hibino (Japan) Miyu Kato	4–6, 2–6
Win	8.	14 June 2015	ITF Kashiwa, Japan	Hard	(Japan) Miyu Kato	(Japan) Mana Ayukawa (Japan) Makoto Ninomiya	6–2, 5–7, [10–8]
Win	9.	18 July 2015	ITF Bangkok, Thailand	Hard	(Japan) Erika Sema	(Japan) Kanae Hisami (Japan) Kotomi Takahata	4–6, 6–3, [11–9]
Win	10.	28 November 2015	Toyota World Challenge, Japan	Carpet (i)	(Thailand) Peangtarn Plipuech	(Thailand) Luksika Kumkhum (Japan) Yuuki Tanaka	3–6, 6–0, [11–9]
Win	11.	12 March 2016	ITF Puebla, México	Hard (i)	(India) Prarthana Thombare	(Russia) Irina Khromacheva (Russia) Ksenia Lykina	6–4, 2–6, [10–8]
Loss	8.	20 March 2016	ITF Irapuato, Mexico	Hard	(India) Prarthana Thombare	(Ukraine) Lyudmyla Kichenok (Ukraine) Nadiia Kichenok	1–6, 4–6
Win	12.	1 July 2016	ITF Gimcheon, Korea	Hard	(Japan) Robu Kajitani	(South Korea) Jung So-hee (South Korea) Park Sang-hee	5–7, 6–4, [10–5]
Win	13.	15 July 2016	ITF Qujing, China	Hard	(Thailand) Peangtarn Plipuech	(China) Jiang Xinyu (China) Tang Qianhui	6–3, 6–3
Loss	9.	5 August 2016	ITF Nonthaburi, Thailand	Hard	(Japan) Miyabi Inoue	(Russia) Olga Doroshina (Russia) Yana Sizikova	6–4, 3–6, [9–11]
Win	14.	27 August 2016	ITF Tsukuba, Japan	Hard	(China) Lu Jiajing	(Japan) Shiho Akita (Japan) Miki Miyamura	6–3, 4–6, [10–6]
Loss	10.	1 October 2016	ITF Iizuka, Japan	Hard	(Japan) Miharu Imanishi	(Japan) Kanae Hisami (Japan) Kotomi Takahata	2–6, 6–3, [4–10]
Win	15.	22 October 2016	Suzhou Ladies Open, China	Hard	(Japan) Hiroko Kuwata	(United States) Jacqueline Cako (Uzbekistan) Sabina Sharipova	6–1, 6–3
Win	16.	19 November 2016	Toyota World Challenge, Japan	Carpet (i)	(Russia) Ksenia Lykina	(Japan) Rika Fujiwara (Japan) Ayaka Okuno	6–7^{(4)}, 6–2, [10–5]
Win	17.	6 January 2017	ITF Hong Kong	Hard	(Japan) Hiroko Kuwata	(Russia) Ksenia Lykina (Japan) Riko Sawayanagi	6–1, 6–0
Loss	11.	15 July 2017	Reinert Open, Germany	Clay	(Japan) Misa Eguchi	(Germany) Katharina Gerlach (Germany) Julia Wachaczyk	6–4, 1–6, [7–10]
Win	18.	26 August 2017	ITF Tsukuba, Japan	Hard	(Japan) Miharu Imanishi	(Australia) Naiktha Bains (Chinese Taipei) Hsu Chieh-yu	6–4, 6–4
Loss	12.	7 October 2017	ITF Pula, Italy	Clay	(Slovakia) Michaela Hončová	(Italy) Anastasia Grymalska (United States) Chiara Scholl	6–4, 3–6, [11–13]
Loss	13.	14 October 2017	ITF Pula, Italy	Clay	(Croatia) Tereza Mrdeža	(Romania) Elena Bogdan (Russia) Valeriya Solovyeva	6–7^{(7)}, 7–5, [9–11]
Win	19.	11 November 2017	ITF Vinaròs, Spain	Clay	(Japan) Misa Eguchi	(India) Snehadevi Reddy (Ecuador) Charlotte Römer	6–2, 6–2
Loss	14.	14 April 2018	ITF Osaka, Japan	Hard	(Thailand) Peangtarn Plipuech	(South Korea) Choi Ji-hee (Thailand) Nicha Lertpitaksinchai	3–6, 4–6
Loss	15.	12 May 2018	ITF Goyang, Korea	Hard	(Norway) Ulrikke Eikeri	(South Korea) Han Na-lae (South Korea) Lee So-ra	2–6, 7–5, [2–10]
Win	20.	15 June 2018	ITF Singapore	Hard	(Japan) Haruka Kaji	(South Korea) Han Na-lae (South Korea) Lee So-ra	7–5, 6–2
Win	21.	14 July 2018	ITF Winnipeg, Canada	Hard	(Mexico) Victoria Rodriguez	(Israel) Julia Glushko (United States) Sanaz Marand	7–6^{(2)}, 6–3
Win	22.	25 August 2018	ITF Tsukuba, Japan	Hard	(China) You Xiaodi	(Australia) Naiktha Bains (Japan) Hiroko Kuwata	6–0, 7–6^{(4)}
Win	23.	6 October 2018	ITF Óbidos, Portugal	Carpet	(Serbia) Natalija Kostić	(Latvia) Diāna Marcinkeviča (Hungary) Panna Udvardy	6–3, 4–6, [10–7]
Loss	16.	9 March 2019	ITF Yokohama, Japan	Hard	(India) Rutuja Bhosale	(South Korea) Han Na-lae (South Korea) Choi Ji-hee	1–6, 5–7
Loss	17.	4 May 2019	Kangaroo Cup, Japan	Hard	(Thailand) Peangtarn Plipuech	(China) Duan Yingying (China) Han Xinyun	3–6, 6–4, [4–10]
Loss	18.	27 July 2019	ITF Nonthaburi, Thailand	Hard	(Thailand) Peangtarn Plipuech	(Hong Kong) Eudice Chong (Indonesia) Aldila Sutjiadi	6–7^{(2)}, 4–6
Loss	19.	13 June 2021	ITF Montemor-o-Novo, Portugal	Hard	(Japan) Eri Hozumi	(Norway) Ulrikke Eikeri (Greece) Valentini Grammatikopoulou	1–6, 0–6
Loss	20.	27 June 2021	ITF Porto, Portugal	Hard	(Japan) Mana Ayukawa	(Netherlands) Arianne Hartono (Japan) Yuriko Miyazaki	5–7, 2–6
Loss	21.	27 April 2024	ITF Nottingham, UK	Hard	(Japan) Hikaru Sato	(Austria) Tamira Paszek (Switzerland) Valentina Ryser	2–6, 7–5, [5–10]
Loss	22.	11 August 2024	ITF Roehampton, UK	Hard	(Japan) Eri Shimizu	(Uzbekistan) Nigina Abduraimova (Australia) Lizette Cabrera	2–6, 2–6
Loss	23.	18 August 2024	ITF Aldershot, UK	Hard	(Thailand) Punnin Kovapitukted	(United Kingdom) Naiktha Bains (United Kingdom) Mingge Xu	4–6, 3–6
Win	24.	9 November 2024	ITF Hamamatsu, Japan	Carpet	(Japan) Hiromi Abe	(Japan) Momoko Kobori (Japan) Ayano Shimizu	6–0, 6–0
Win	25.	1 March 2025	ITF Ahmedabad, India	Hard	(Japan) Ikumi Yamazaki	(India) Vaishnavi Adkar (India) Ankita Raina	6–2, 2–6, [10–7]
Loss	24.	22 March 2025	Kōfu International Open, Japan	Hard	(Japan) Eri Shimizu	(Japan) Momoko Kobori (Japan) Ayano Shimizu	1–6, 4–6
Loss	25.	10 May 2025	Fukuoka International, Japan	Carpet	(Japan) Miho Kuramochi	(Japan) Momoko Kobori (Japan) Ayano Shimizu	6–4, 2–6, [8–10]
