= 2016 Fukuoka International Women's Cup =

- Date: 9–15 May
- Edition: 16th
- Category: ITF Women's Circuit
- Prize money: $50,000
- Surface: Grass
- Location: Fukuoka, Japan

Champions

Singles
- (Russia) Ksenia Lykina

Doubles
- (Netherlands) Indy de Vroome / (Bulgaria) Aleksandrina Naydenova
| ← 2015 · | Fukuoka International Women's Cup | · 2017 → |

The 2016 Fukuoka International Women's Cup was a professional tennis tournament played on outdoor grass courts. It was the sixteenth edition of the tournament and part of the 2016 ITF Women's Circuit, offering a total of $50,000 in prize money. It took place in Fukuoka, Japan, on 9–15 May 2016.

== Singles main draw entrants ==
=== Seeds ===
| Country | Player | Rank^{1} | Seed |
|---|---|---|---|
| BEL | An-Sophie Mestach | 169 | 1 |
| KOR | Jang Su-jeong | 173 | 2 |
| JPN | Eri Hozumi | 202 | 3 |
| JPN | Hiroko Kuwata | 204 | 4 |
| UZB | Nigina Abduraimova | 217 | 5 |
| JPN | Erika Sema | 251 | 6 |
| JPN | Ayaka Okuno | 268 | 7 |
| JPN | Shuko Aoyama | 281 | 8 |

- ^{1} Rankings as of 2 May 2016.

=== Other entrants ===
The following players received wildcards into the singles main draw:

- (Japan) Rika Fujiwara
- (Japan) Haine Ogata
- (Japan) Lisa-Marie Rioux
- (Japan) Kimika Sakata

The following players received entry from the qualifying draw:

- (Japan) Shiho Akita
- (Japan) Mana Ayukawa
- (Australia) Lizette Cabrera
- (Chinese Taipei) Lee Pei-chi

The following player received entry by a protected ranking:

- (Japan) Miharu Imanishi

== Champions ==
=== Singles ===
- (Russia) Ksenia Lykina def. (Japan) Kyōka Okamura, 6–2, 6–7^{(2–7)}, 6–0

=== Doubles ===
- (Netherlands) Indy de Vroome / (Bulgaria) Aleksandrina Naydenova def. (Uzbekistan) Nigina Abduraimova / (Russia) Ksenia Lykina, 6–4, 6–1
