= 2016 Fukuoka International Women's Cup – Singles =

Singles
- 2016 Fukuoka International Women's Cup

Final
- Champion: (Russia) Ksenia Lykina
- Runner-up: (Japan) Kyōka Okamura
- Score: 6–2, 6–7^{(2–7)}, 6–0

Events
| Singles | Doubles |
| ← 2015 · | Fukuoka International Women's Cup | · 2017 → |

Kristýna Plíšková was the defending champion, but chose to participate in Trnava instead. Remarkably, all of the eight seeded players lost in the first round.

Ksenia Lykina won the title, defeating Kyōka Okamura in the final, 6–2, 6–7^{(2–7)}, 6–0.

== Seeds ==
1. (Belgium) An-Sophie Mestach (first round)
2. (South Korea) Jang Su-jeong (first round)
3. (Japan) Eri Hozumi (first round)
4. (Japan) Hiroko Kuwata (first round)
5. (Uzbekistan) Nigina Abduraimova (first round)
6. (Japan) Erika Sema (first round)
7. (Japan) Ayaka Okuno (first round)
8. (Japan) Shuko Aoyama (first round)

== Main draw ==
=== Key ===
- Q = Qualifier
- WC = Wild card
- LL = Lucky loser
- Alt = Alternate
- SE = Special exempt
- PR = Protected ranking
- ITF = ITF entry
- JE = Junior exempt
- w/o = Walkover
- r = Retired
- d = Defaulted
- SR = Special ranking

=== Finals ===
Semifinals
(Russia) Ksenia Lykina | 6^{3} | 7^{8} | 6
(Japan) Junri Namigata | 7^{7} | 6^{6} | 0
(Australia) Storm Sanders | 2 | 6 | 4
(Japan) Kyōka Okamura | 6 | 4 | 6

Final
(Russia) Ksenia Lykina | 6 | 6^{2} | 6
(Japan) Kyōka Okamura | 2 | 7^{7} | 0

=== Top half ===
First round
1 | (Belgium) A-S Mestach | 0 | 7^{7} | 1
(Netherlands) I de Vroome | 6 | 6^{4} | 6
(Hungary) D Gálfi | 6 | 6
(Chinese Taipei) C-y Hsu | 4 | 1
WC | (Japan) K Sakata | 0 | 0
(Russia) K Lykina | 6 | 6
Q | (Australia) L Cabrera | 6^{4} | 6 | 6
8 | (Japan) S Aoyama | 7^{7} | 4 | 1
3 | (Japan) E Hozumi | 2 | 4
(Japan) M Ninomiya | 6 | 6
WC | (Japan) R Fujiwara | 7 | 1 | 2
(China) S Xu | 5 | 6 | 6
(Thailand) P Plipuech | 1 | 2
(Japan) J Namigata | 6 | 6
Q | (Chinese Taipei) P-c Lee | 6 | 7^{7}
6 | (Japan) E Sema | 1 | 6^{3}

Second round
(Netherlands) I de Vroome | 6 | 4 | 7^{8}
(Hungary) D Gálfi | 1 | 6 | 6^{6}
(Russia) K Lykina | 6 | 6
Q | (Australia) L Cabrera | 4 | 4
(Japan) M Ninomiya | 6 | 3 | 6
(China) S Xu | 3 | 6 | 1
(Japan) J Namigata | 6 | 6
Q | (Chinese Taipei) P-c Lee | 3 | 1

Quarterfinals
(Netherlands) I de Vroome | 6 | 4 | 4
(Russia) K Lykina | 4 | 6 | 6
(Japan) M Ninomiya | 4 | 0
(Japan) J Namigata | 6 | 6

Semifinals
(Russia) K Lykina | 6^{3} | 7^{8} | 6
(Japan) J Namigata | 7^{7} | 6^{6} | 0

=== Bottom half ===
First round
5 | (Uzbekistan) N Abduraimova | 4 | 3
(Bulgaria) A Naydenova | 6 | 6
(Chinese Taipei) C-w Hsu | 6 | 6
PR | (Japan) M Imanishi | 1 | 3
WC | (Japan) H Ogata | 6 | 0 | 0
(United Kingdom) K Dunne | 1 | 6 | 6
(Australia) S Sanders | 6 | 1 | 6
4 | (Japan) H Kuwata | 4 | 6 | 2
7 | (Japan) A Okuno | 6 | 2 | 4
(Japan) K Okamura | 3 | 6 | 6
WC | (Japan) L-M Rioux | 1 | 2
(Japan) M Inoue | 6 | 6
(South Korea) J-h Choi | 0 | 2
Q | (Japan) M Ayukawa | 6 | 6
Q | (Japan) S Akita | 6 | 5 | 6
2 | (South Korea) S-j Jang | 1 | 7 | 2

Second round
(Bulgaria) A Naydenova | 2 | 6 | 5
(Chinese Taipei) C-w Hsu | 6 | 1 | 7
(United Kingdom) K Dunne | 4 | 6 | 2
(Australia) S Sanders | 6 | 4 | 6
(Japan) K Okamura | 6 | 4 | 6
(Japan) M Inoue | 3 | 6 | 0
Q | (Japan) M Ayukawa | 0 | 4
Q | (Japan) S Akita | 6 | 6

Quarterfinals
(Chinese Taipei) C-w Hsu | 4 | 5
(Australia) S Sanders | 6 | 7
(Japan) K Okamura | 6 | 5
Q | (Japan) S Akita | 4 | 1^{r}

Semifinals
(Australia) S Sanders | 2 | 6 | 4
(Japan) K Okamura | 6 | 4 | 6
