= 2016 Fukuoka International Women's Cup – Doubles =

Doubles
- 2016 Fukuoka International Women's Cup

Final
- Champions: (Netherlands) Indy de Vroome (Bulgaria) Aleksandrina Naydenova
- Runners-up: (Uzbekistan) Nigina Abduraimova (Russia) Ksenia Lykina
- Score: 6–4, 6–1

Events
| Singles | Doubles |
| ← 2015 · | Fukuoka International Women's Cup | · 2017 → |

Naomi Broady and Kristýna Plíšková were the defending champions, but both players chose to participate in Rome and Trnava instead, respectively.

Indy de Vroome and Aleksandrina Naydenova won the title, defeating Nigina Abduraimova and Ksenia Lykina in the final, 6–4, 6–1.

== Seeds ==
1. (Belgium) An-Sophie Mestach / (Australia) Storm Sanders (quarterfinals, withdrew)
2. (Japan) Kanae Hisami / (Japan) Kotomi Takahata (semifinals)
3. (Japan) Akiko Omae / (Thailand) Peangtarn Plipuech (first round)
4. (South Korea) Choi Ji-hee / (Japan) Makoto Ninomiya (quarterfinals)

== Draw ==
=== Key ===
- Q = Qualifier
- WC = Wild card
- LL = Lucky loser
- Alt = Alternate
- SE = Special exempt
- PR = Protected ranking
- ITF = ITF entry
- JE = Junior exempt
- w/o = Walkover
- r = Retired
- d = Defaulted
- SR = Special ranking

First round
1 | (Belgium) A-S Mestach (Australia) S Sanders | 6 | 6
Q | (Japan) M Miyamura (Japan) A Okuno | 1 | 1
(Netherlands) I de Vroome (Bulgaria) A Naydenova | 5 | 6 | [11]
(Chinese Taipei) C-y Hsu (Chinese Taipei) P-c Lee | 7 | 0 | [9]
4 | (South Korea) J-h Choi (Japan) M Ninomiya | 6 | 6
WC | (Japan) S Hisamitsu (Japan) Y Yasuda | 1 | 0
Q | (United States) Y Chiang (Japan) Y Saigo | 3 | 2
(Japan) J Namigata (Japan) E Sema | 6 | 6
(Japan) M Inoue (Thailand) N Lertpitaksinchai | 4 | 6 | [5]
WC | (Japan) R Fujiwara (Japan) M Imanishi | 6 | 2 | [10]
(Uzbekistan) N Abduraimova (Russia) K Lykina | 6 | 7^{11}
3 | (Japan) A Omae (Thailand) Pe Plipuech | 4 | 6^{9}
WC | (Japan) R Kajitani (Japan) A Yoshitomi | 0 | 2
(Japan) M Ayukawa (Japan) Y Tanaka | 6 | 6
(Chinese Taipei) C-w Hsu (China) S Xu | 6^{6} | 6^{8}
2 | (Japan) K Hisami (Japan) K Takahata | 7^{8} | 7^{10}

Quarterfinals
1 | (Belgium) A-S Mestach (Australia) S Sanders
(Netherlands) I de Vroome (Bulgaria) A Naydenova | w/o
4 | (South Korea) J-h Choi (Japan) M Ninomiya | 7^{8} | 2 | [6]
(Japan) J Namigata (Japan) E Sema | 6^{6} | 6 | [10]
WC | (Japan) R Fujiwara (Japan) M Imanishi | 3 | 2
(Uzbekistan) N Abduraimova (Russia) K Lykina | 6 | 6
(Japan) M Ayukawa (Japan) Y Tanaka | 6 | 2 | [9]
2 | (Japan) K Hisami (Japan) K Takahata | 1 | 6 | [11]

Semifinals
(Netherlands) I de Vroome (Bulgaria) A Naydenova | 6 | 6
(Japan) J Namigata (Japan) E Sema | 2 | 3
(Uzbekistan) N Abduraimova (Russia) K Lykina | 4 | 6 | [10]
2 | (Japan) K Hisami (Japan) K Takahata | 6 | 3 | [7]

Final
(Netherlands) I de Vroome (Bulgaria) A Naydenova | 6 | 6
(Uzbekistan) N Abduraimova (Russia) K Lykina | 4 | 1
