= 2017 Fukuoka International Women's Cup =

- Date: 8–14 May
- Edition: 17th
- Category: ITF Women's Circuit
- Prize money: $60,000
- Surface: Carpet
- Location: Fukuoka, Japan

Champions

Singles
- (Slovakia) Magdaléna Rybáriková

Doubles
- (Japan) Junri Namigata / (Japan) Kotomi Takahata
← 2016 ·	Fukuoka International Women's Cup	· 2018 →

The 2017 Fukuoka International Women's Cup was a professional tennis tournament played on outdoor carpet courts. It was the seventeenth edition of the tournament and part of the 2017 ITF Women's Circuit, offering a total of $60,000 in prize money. It took place in Fukuoka, Japan, from 8–14 May 2017.

== Point distribution ==
Event	W	F	SF	QF	Round of 16	Round of 32	Q	Q2	Q3
Singles	80	48	29	15	8	1	5	3	1
Doubles	80	48	29	15	1	—	—	—	—

== Singles main draw entrants ==
=== Seeds ===
Country	Player	Rank^{1}	Seed
KOR	Jang Su-jeong	142	1
KAZ	Zarina Diyas	151	2
UZB	Nigina Abduraimova	178	3
JPN	Hiroko Kuwata	180	4
RUS	Ksenia Lykina	186	5
JPN	Riko Sawayanagi	208	6
GBR	Laura Robson	234	7
JPN	Junri Namigata	238	8

- ^{1} Rankings as of 1 May 2017

=== Other entrants ===
The following players received wildcards into the singles main draw:

- (Japan) Rika Fujiwara
- (Japan) Momoko Kobori
- (Japan) Ayumi Miyamoto
- (Japan) Aiko Yoshitomi

The following players received entry into the singles main draw by a protected ranking:

- (Australia) Kimberly Birrell
- (Slovakia) Magdaléna Rybáriková

The following players received entry from the qualifying draw:

- (Australia) Monique Adamczak
- (Japan) Nagi Hanatani
- (Japan) Erina Hayashi
- (Japan) Yukina Saigo

== Champions ==
=== Singles ===
- (Slovakia) Magdaléna Rybáriková def. (South Korea) Jang Su-jeong, 6–2, 6–3

=== Doubles ===
- (Japan) Junri Namigata / (Japan) Kotomi Takahata def. (Japan) Erina Hayashi / (Japan) Robu Kajitani, 6–0, 6–7^{(3–7)}, [10–7]
