= 2017 Fukuoka International Women's Cup – Doubles =

Doubles
- 2017 Fukuoka International Women's Cup

Final
- Champion: (Japan) Junri Namigata (Japan) Kotomi Takahata
- Runner-up: (Japan) Erina Hayashi (Japan) Robu Kajitani
- Score: 6–0, 6–7^{(3–7)}, [10–7]

Events
| Singles | Doubles |
- Fukuoka International Women's Cup

Indy de Vroome and Aleksandrina Naydenova were the defending champions, but both players chose not to participate.

Junri Namigata and Kotomi Takahata won the title, defeating Erina Hayashi and Robu Kajitani in an all-Japanese final, 6–0, 6–7^{(3–7)}, [10–7].

== Seeds ==
1. (Australia) Jessica Moore / (Thailand) Varatchaya Wongteanchai (semifinals)
2. (Russia) Ksenia Lykina / (Japan) Riko Sawayanagi (first round)
3. (Japan) Rika Fujiwara / (Japan) Ayaka Okuno (first round)
4. (Uzbekistan) Nigina Abduraimova / (China) Lu Jingjing (first round)

== Draw ==
Key

- Q = Qualifier
- WC = Wild card
- LL = Lucky loser
- Alt = Alternate
- ITF = ITF entry
- PR = Protected ranking
- SR = Special ranking
- SE = Special exempt
- JE = Junior exempt
- JR = Junior Accelerator Programme entrant
- CO = College Accelerator Programme entrant
- NG = Next Gen Accelerator Program entrant
- w/o = Walkover
- r = Retired
- d = Defaulted

First round
1 | (Australia) J Moore (Thailand) V Wongteanchai | 7^{7} | 6
(United Kingdom) K Dunne (Australia) T Patterson | 6^{3} | 4
WC | (Japan) S Baba (Japan) H Ogata | 4 | 4
(Australia) M Adamczak (Australia) O Tjandramulia | 6 | 6
3 | (Japan) R Fujiwara (Japan) A Okuno | 6^{5} | 6^{6}
(Japan) M Imanishi (Japan) Y Tanaka | 7^{7} | 7^{8}
(Japan) M Ayukawa (Japan) K Okamura | 2 | 2
(Japan) E Hayashi (Japan) R Kajitani | 6 | 6
WC | (Japan) M Minokoshi (Japan) A Shimizu | 3 | 3
Q | (Australia) K Birrell (Japan) A Yoshitomi | 6 | 6
(United Kingdom) L Robson (Japan) E Sema | 4 | 6 | [12]
4 | (Uzbekistan) N Abduraimova (China) J Lu | 6 | 3 | [10]
Q | (Japan) M Kobori (Japan) Y Saigo | 6 | 6
WC | (Japan) H Sakamoto (Japan) A Sonoda | 2 | 3
(Japan) J Namigata (Japan) K Takahata | 6 | 6
2 | (Russia) K Lykina (Japan) R Sawayanagi | 4 | 3

Quarterfinals
1 | (Australia) J Moore (Thailand) V Wongteanchai | 6 | 6
(Australia) M Adamczak (Australia) O Tjandramulia | 4 | 2
(Japan) M Imanishi (Japan) Y Tanaka | 6 | 1 | [4]
(Japan) E Hayashi (Japan) R Kajitani | 1 | 6 | [10]
Q | (Australia) K Birrell (Japan) A Yoshitomi | w/o
(United Kingdom) L Robson (Japan) E Sema
Q | (Japan) M Kobori (Japan) Y Saigo | 1 | 6 | [5]
(Japan) J Namigata (Japan) K Takahata | 6 | 3 | [10]

Semifinals
1 | (Australia) J Moore (Thailand) V Wongteanchai | 6 | 2 | [2]
(Japan) E Hayashi (Japan) R Kajitani | 4 | 6 | [10]
Q | (Australia) K Birrell (Japan) A Yoshitomi | 1 | 7^{7} | [11]
(Japan) J Namigata (Japan) K Takahata | 6 | 6^{5} | [13]

Final
(Japan) E Hayashi (Japan) R Kajitani | 0 | 7^{7} | [7]
(Japan) J Namigata (Japan) K Takahata | 6 | 6^{3} | [10]
