= 2015 Fukuoka International Women's Cup =

- Date: 4–10 May
- Edition: 15th
- Category: ITF Women's Circuit
- Prize money: $50,000
- Surface: Grass
- Location: Fukuoka, Japan

Champions

Singles
- (Czech Republic) Kristýna Plíšková

Doubles
- (United Kingdom) Naomi Broady / (Czech Republic) Kristýna Plíšková
← 2014 ·	Fukuoka International Women's Cup	· 2016 →

The 2015 Fukuoka International Women's Cup was a professional tennis tournament played on outdoor grass courts. It was the fifteenth edition of the tournament and part of the 2015 ITF Women's Circuit, offering a total of $50,000 in prize money. It took place in Fukuoka, Japan, on 4–10 May 2015.

== Singles main draw entrants ==
=== Seeds ===
Country	Player	Rank^{1}	Seed
BEL	An-Sophie Mestach	109	1
CZE	Kristýna Plíšková	124	2
JPN	Misa Eguchi	144	3
JPN	Kimiko Date-Krumm	148	4
JPN	Eri Hozumi	158	5
RUS	Ekaterina Bychkova	159	6
GBR	Naomi Broady	161	7
JPN	Junri Namigata	181	8

- ^{1} Rankings as of 27 April 2015

=== Other entrants ===
The following players received wildcards into the singles main draw:

- (Japan) Ayumi Morita
- (Japan) Chihiro Muramatsu
- (Japan) Makoto Ninomiya
- (Japan) Akiko Yonemura

The following players received entry from the qualifying draw:

- (Poland) Magdalena Fręch
- (Japan) Miyu Kato
- (Japan) Miki Miyamura
- (Japan) Akiko Omae

== Champions ==
=== Singles ===
- (Czech Republic) Kristýna Plíšková def. (Japan) Nao Hibino, 7–5, 6–4

=== Doubles ===
- (United Kingdom) Naomi Broady / (Czech Republic) Kristýna Plíšková def. (Japan) Eri Hozumi / (Japan) Junri Namigata, 6–3, 6–4
