= 2014 Fukuoka International Women's Cup =

- Date: 5–11 May
- Edition: 14th
- Category: ITF Women's Circuit
- Prize money: $50,000
- Surface: Grass
- Location: Fukuoka, Japan

Champions

Singles
- (United Kingdom) Naomi Broady

Doubles
- (Japan) Shuko Aoyama / (Japan) Eri Hozumi
← 2013 ·	Fukuoka International Women's Cup	· 2015 →

The 2014 Fukuoka International Women's Cup was a professional tennis tournament played on outdoor grass courts. It was the fourteenth edition of the tournament and part of the 2014 ITF Women's Circuit, offering a total of $50,000 in prize money. It took place in Fukuoka, Japan, on 5–11 May 2014.

== Singles main draw entrants ==
=== Seeds ===
Country	Player	Rank^{1}	Seed
BEL	An-Sophie Mestach	120	1
CZE	Kristýna Plíšková	128	2
JPN	Eri Hozumi	166	3
JPN	Erika Sema	183	4
~~JPN~~	~~Sachie Ishizu~~	~~186~~	~~5~~
UKR	Olga Savchuk	188	6
FRA	Irena Pavlovic	193	7
RUS	Ekaterina Bychkova	207	8
GBR	Naomi Broady	218	9

- ^{1} Rankings as of 28 April 2014

=== Other entrants ===
The following players received wildcards into the singles main draw:

- (Japan) Miyu Kato
- (Japan) Naomi Osaka
- (Japan) Riko Sawayanagi
- (Thailand) Tamarine Tanasugarn

The following players received entry from the qualifying draw:

- (Australia) Monique Adamczak
- (Japan) Miyabi Inoue
- (Montenegro) Ana Veselinović
- (Japan) Yuuki Tanaka

The following player received entry by a lucky loser spot:

- (United States) Tori Kinard

== Champions ==
=== Singles ===
- (United Kingdom) Naomi Broady def. (Czech Republic) Kristýna Plíšková 5–7, 6–3, 6–4

=== Doubles ===
- (Japan) Shuko Aoyama / (Japan) Eri Hozumi def. (United Kingdom) Naomi Broady / (Greece) Eleni Daniilidou 6–3, 6–4
