= 2017 Fukuoka International Women's Cup – Singles =

Singles
- 2017 Fukuoka International Women's Cup

Final
- Champion: (Slovakia) Magdaléna Rybáriková
- Runner-up: (South Korea) Jang Su-jeong
- Score: 6–2, 6–3

Events
Singles	Doubles
← 2016 ·	Fukuoka International Women's Cup	· 2018 →

Ksenia Lykina was the defending champion, but lost to Zarina Diyas in the quarterfinals.

Magdaléna Rybáriková won the title, defeating Jang Su-jeong in the final, 6–2, 6–3.

== Seeds ==
1. (South Korea) Jang Su-jeong (final)
2. (Kazakhstan) Zarina Diyas (semifinals)
3. (Uzbekistan) Nigina Abduraimova (first round)
4. (Japan) Hiroko Kuwata (first round)
5. (Russia) Ksenia Lykina (quarterfinals)
6. (Japan) Riko Sawayanagi (second round)
7. (United Kingdom) Laura Robson (quarterfinals; retired)
8. (Japan) Junri Namigata (first round)

== Draw ==
=== Key ===
- Q = Qualifier
- WC = Wild card
- LL = Lucky loser
- Alt = Alternate
- SE = Special exempt
- PR = Protected ranking
- ITF = ITF entry
- JE = Junior exempt
- w/o = Walkover
- r = Retired
- d = Defaulted
- SR = Special ranking

=== Finals ===
Semifinals
1	(South Korea) Jang Su-jeong	6	6
(Australia) Jessica Moore	3	2
PR	(Slovakia) Magdaléna Rybáriková	6	7
2	(Kazakhstan) Zarina Diyas	3	5

Final
1	(South Korea) Jang Su-jeong	2	3
PR	(Slovakia) Magdaléna Rybáriková	6	6

=== Top half ===
First round
1	(South Korea) S-j Jang	4	7	6
(Japan) E Sema	6	5	1
(Japan) M Minokoshi	6	6
WC	(Japan) R Fujiwara	2	3
PR	(Australia) K Birrell	6	6
(Japan) A Shimizu	4	1
(Japan) H Arakawa	1	4
7	(United Kingdom) L Robson	6	6
4	(Japan) H Kuwata	4	3
(Japan) M Imanishi	6	6
(Japan) M Ayukawa	2	3
(Australia) J Moore	6	6
WC	(Japan) M Kobori	1	4
(Thailand) V Wongteanchai	6	6
Q	(Japan) Y Saigo	0	6	2
6	(Japan) R Sawayanagi	6	4	6

Second round
1	(South Korea) S-j Jang	6	3	6
(Japan) M Minokoshi	1	6	1
PR	(Australia) K Birrell	4	3
7	(United Kingdom) L Robson	6	6
(Japan) M Imanishi	3	4
(Australia) J Moore	6	6
(Thailand) V Wongteanchai	7	6
6	(Japan) R Sawayanagi	5	4

Quarterfinals
1	(South Korea) S-j Jang	6	2
7	(United Kingdom) L Robson	4	0^{r}
(Australia) J Moore	6	4	6
(Thailand) V Wongteanchai	4	6	4

Semifinals
1	(South Korea) S-j Jang	6	6
(Australia) J Moore	3	2

=== Bottom half ===
First round
8	(Japan) J Namigata	7	5	2
(China) J Lu	5	7	6
(Japan) K Okamura	2	3
PR	(Slovakia) M Rybáriková	6	6
(Japan) Y Tanaka	5	6	6^{4}
(United Kingdom) K Boulter	7	1	7^{7}
Q	(Australia) M Adamczak	3	6	6
3	(Uzbekistan) N Abduraimova	6	2	3
5	(Russia) K Lykina	6	6
Q	(Japan) N Hanatani	3	1
WC	(Japan) A Miyamoto	1	4
WC	(Japan) A Yoshitomi	6	6
(Japan) A Okuno	3	3
Q	(Japan) E Hayashi	6	6
(United Kingdom) K Dunne	2	0
2	(Kazakhstan) Z Diyas	6	6

Second round
(China) J Lu	3	2
PR	(Slovakia) M Rybáriková	6	6
(United Kingdom) K Boulter	6	7
Q	(Australia) M Adamczak	2	5
5	(Russia) K Lykina	6	6
WC	(Japan) A Yoshitomi	1	3
Q	(Japan) E Hayashi	1	3
2	(Kazakhstan) Z Diyas	6	6

Quarterfinals
PR	(Slovakia) M Rybáriková	6	6
(United Kingdom) K Boulter	3	0
5	(Russia) K Lykina	0	4
2	(Kazakhstan) Z Diyas	6	6

Semifinals
PR	(Slovakia) M Rybáriková	6	7
2	(Kazakhstan) Z Diyas	3	5
