= 2015 Fukuoka International Women's Cup – Singles =

Singles
- 2015 Fukuoka International Women's Cup

Final
- Champion: (Czech Republic) Kristýna Plíšková
- Runner-up: (Japan) Nao Hibino
- Score: 7–5, 6–4

Events
Singles	Doubles
← 2014 ·	Fukuoka International Women's Cup	· 2016 →

Naomi Broady was the defending champion, but lost in the first round to Miharu Imanishi.

Kristýna Plíšková won the title, defeating Nao Hibino in the final, 7–5, 6–4.

== Seeds ==
1. (Belgium) An-Sophie Mestach (quarterfinals)
2. (Czech Republic) Kristýna Plíšková (champion)
3. (Japan) Misa Eguchi (second round)
4. (Japan) Kimiko Date-Krumm (first round)
5. (Japan) Eri Hozumi (second round)
6. (Russia) Ekaterina Bychkova (second round)
7. (United Kingdom) Naomi Broady (first round)
8. (Japan) Junri Namigata (semifinals)

== Main draw ==
=== Key ===
- Q = Qualifier
- WC = Wild card
- LL = Lucky loser
- Alt = Alternate
- SE = Special exempt
- PR = Protected ranking
- ITF = ITF entry
- JE = Junior exempt
- w/o = Walkover
- r = Retired
- d = Defaulted
- SR = Special ranking

=== Finals ===
Semifinals
(Thailand) Varatchaya Wongteanchai	1	6	4
(Japan) Nao Hibino	6	4	6
8	(Japan) Junri Namigata	3	2
2	(Czech Republic) Kristýna Plíšková	6	6

Final
(Japan) Nao Hibino	5	4
2	(Czech Republic) Kristýna Plíšková	7	6

=== Top half ===
First round
1	(Belgium) A-S Mestach	6	6
(Japan) S Aoyama	1	4
WC	(Japan) M Ninomiya	7^{7}	6
WC	(Japan) C Muramatsu	6^{3}	0
WC	(Japan) A Yonemura	4	4
(Thailand) V Wongteanchai	6	6
(United Kingdom) E Webley-Smith	4	2
6	(Russia) E Bychkova	6	6
3	(Japan) M Eguchi	3	6	6
(United Kingdom) K Dunne	6	3	0
Q	(Japan) M Miyamura	1	2
(Japan) N Hibino	6	6
Q	(Japan) M Kato	6	6
(South Korea) S-j Jang	4	3
(Japan) A Okuno	2	4
5	(Japan) E Hozumi	6	6

Second round
1	(Belgium) A-S Mestach	6	6
WC	(Japan) M Ninomiya	4	1
(Thailand) V Wongteanchai	1	6	6
6	(Russia) E Bychkova	6	3	4
3	(Japan) M Eguchi	6	5	4
(Japan) N Hibino	4	7	6
Q	(Japan) M Kato	6	6
5	(Japan) E Hozumi	4	3

Quarterfinals
1	(Belgium) A-S Mestach	5	3
(Thailand) V Wongteanchai	7	6
(Japan) N Hibino	4	6	6
Q	(Japan) M Kato	6	4	0

Semifinals
(Thailand) V Wongteanchai	1	6	4
(Japan) N Hibino	6	4	6

=== Bottom half ===
First round
8	(Japan) J Namigata	6	6
Q	(Poland) M Fręch	3	3
(Japan) M Hibi	6	6
(Japan) M Inoue	3	2
(Japan) R Sawayanagi	1	3
(Japan) E Sema	6	6
(Sweden) S Celik	7^{8}	7
4	(Japan) K Date-Krumm	6^{6}	5
7	(United Kingdom) N Broady	1	4
(Japan) M Imanishi	6	6
(Slovenia) D Jakupović	6	6
Q	(Japan) A Omae	2	4
WC	(Japan) A Morita	4	2
(Netherlands) I de Vroome	6	6
(Russia) A Morgina	1	1
2	(Czech Republic) Kr Plíšková	6	6

Second round
8	(Japan) J Namigata	2	6	7^{7}
(Japan) M Hibi	6	1	6^{3}
(Japan) E Sema	6	6
(Sweden) S Celik	1	0
(Japan) M Imanishi	3	1
(Slovenia) D Jakupović	6	6
(Netherlands) I de Vroome	2	2
2	(Czech Republic) Kr Plíšková	6	6

Quarterfinals
8	(Japan) J Namigata	6	7^{7}
(Japan) E Sema	2	6^{2}
(Slovenia) D Jakupović	4	5
2	(Czech Republic) Kr Plíšková	6	7

Semifinals
8	(Japan) J Namigata	3	2
2	(Czech Republic) Kr Plíšková	6	6
