= 2014 Fukuoka International Women's Cup – Doubles =

Doubles
- 2014 Fukuoka International Women's Cup

Final
- Champions: (Japan) Shuko Aoyama (Japan) Eri Hozumi
- Runners-up: (United Kingdom) Naomi Broady (Greece) Eleni Daniilidou
- Score: 6–3, 6–4

Events
Singles	Doubles
← 2013 ·	Fukuoka International Women's Cup	· 2015 →

Junri Namigata and Erika Sema were the defending champions, having won the event in 2013, however both players chose to defend their titles with different partners. Namigata partnered with Akiko Yonemura but lost in the quarterfinals whilst Sema partnered with Miki Miyamura but lost in the first round.

Shuko Aoyama and Eri Hozumi won the title, defeating Naomi Broady and Eleni Daniilidou in the final, 6–3, 6–4.

== Seeds ==
1. (Japan) Shuko Aoyama / (Japan) Eri Hozumi (champions)
2. (United Kingdom) Naomi Broady / (Greece) Eleni Daniilidou (final)
3. (Australia) Jarmila Gajdošová / (Australia) Arina Rodionova (semifinals)
4. (Japan) Miki Miyamura / (Japan) Erika Sema (first round)

== Draw ==
=== Key ===
- Q = Qualifier
- WC = Wild card
- LL = Lucky loser
- Alt = Alternate
- SE = Special exempt
- PR = Protected ranking
- ITF = ITF entry
- JE = Junior exempt
- w/o = Walkover
- r = Retired
- d = Defaulted
- SR = Special ranking

First round
1	(Japan) S Aoyama (Japan) E Hozumi	6	6
(Japan) K Hisami (Thailand) P Plipuech	1	0
(Russia) E Bychkova (United Kingdom) E Webley-Smith	6	2	[14]
(Japan) R Fujiwara (Thailand) T Tanasugarn	4	6	[12]
4	(Japan) M Miyamura (Japan) E Sema	2	5
(Japan) M Ninomiya (Japan) M Tanaka	6	7
Q	(Chinese Taipei) W-h Hsu (Japan) M Inoue	6	6
WC	(Japan) S Hisamitsu (Japan) Y Yasuda	4	2
WC	(Japan) J Namigata (Japan) A Yonemura	3	6	[10]
(United Kingdom) S Murray (United Kingdom) J Windley	6	2	[6]
WC	(Japan) N Hibino (Japan) C Okadaue	0	3
3	(Australia) J Gajdošová (Australia) Ar Rodionova	6	6
(United Kingdom) J Rae (United Kingdom) A Smith	6	6
(Japan) M Kato (Japan) R Sawayanagi	3	0
Q	(Belgium) Y Bonaventure (Montenegro) A Veselinović	6	3	[5]
2	(United Kingdom) N Broady (Greece) E Daniilidou	0	6	[10]

Quarterfinals
1	(Japan) S Aoyama (Japan) E Hozumi	6	3	[10]
(Russia) E Bychkova (United Kingdom) E Webley-Smith	1	6	[3]
(Japan) M Ninomiya (Japan) M Tanaka	6	7^{7}
Q	(Chinese Taipei) W-h Hsu (Japan) M Inoue	2	6^{3}
WC	(Japan) J Namigata (Japan) A Yonemura	4	2
3	(Australia) J Gajdošová (Australia) Ar Rodionova	6	6
(United Kingdom) J Rae (United Kingdom) A Smith	3	1
2	(United Kingdom) N Broady (Greece) E Daniilidou	6	6

Semifinals
1	(Japan) S Aoyama (Japan) E Hozumi	6^{1}	6	[10]
(Japan) M Ninomiya (Japan) M Tanaka	7^{7}	3	[5]
3	(Australia) J Gajdošová (Australia) Ar Rodionova	0	3
2	(United Kingdom) N Broady (Greece) E Daniilidou	6	6

Final
1	(Japan) S Aoyama (Japan) E Hozumi	6	6
2	(United Kingdom) N Broady (Greece) E Daniilidou	3	4
