= 2015 Fukuoka International Women's Cup – Doubles =

Doubles
- 2015 Fukuoka International Women's Cup

Final
- Champions: (United Kingdom) Naomi Broady (Czech Republic) Kristýna Plíšková
- Runners-up: (Japan) Eri Hozumi (Japan) Junri Namigata
- Score: 6–3, 6–4

Events
Singles	Doubles
← 2014 ·	Fukuoka International Women's Cup	· 2016 →

Shuko Aoyama and Eri Hozumi were the defending champions, but Aoyama chose not to participate. Hozumi partnered Junri Namigata, but lost in the final to Naomi Broady and Kristýna Plíšková, 6–3, 6–4.

== Seeds ==
1. (Japan) Eri Hozumi / (Japan) Junri Namigata (final)
2. (United Kingdom) Naomi Broady / (Czech Republic) Kristýna Plíšková (champion)
3. (Japan) Miki Miyamura / (Thailand) Varatchaya Wongteanchai (semifinals)
4. (Belgium) An-Sophie Mestach / (United Kingdom) Emily Webley-Smith (semifinals)

== Draw ==
=== Key ===
- Q = Qualifier
- WC = Wild card
- LL = Lucky loser
- Alt = Alternate
- SE = Special exempt
- PR = Protected ranking
- ITF = ITF entry
- JE = Junior exempt
- w/o = Walkover
- r = Retired
- d = Defaulted
- SR = Special ranking

First round
1	(Japan) E Hozumi (Japan) J Namigata	6	6
(Japan) C Okadaue (Japan) Y Tanaka	3	4
Q	(Japan) E Sema (Japan) Y Sema	5	7	[10]
WC	(Japan) K Hisami (Japan) A Inoue	7	5	[7]
4	(Belgium) A-S Mestach (United Kingdom) E Webley-Smith	7	3	[10]
(Japan) N Hibino (Japan) M Kato	5	6	[8]
WC	(Japan) Y Nakano (Ukraine) M Zakarlyuk	7	5	[10]
(Australia) A Myers (Japan) A Okuno	5	7	[8]
(Thailand) P Plipuech (Thailand) Varu Wongteanchai	0	1
(Japan) M Eguchi (Japan) R Sawayanagi	6	6
(Japan) R Fujiwara (Japan) M Ninomiya	5	6	[5]
3	(Japan) M Miyamura (Thailand) Vara Wongteanchai	7	4	[10]
(Japan) M Inoue (Japan) A Omae	6	6
WC	(Japan) S Hisamitsu (Japan) Y Yasuda	1	1
Q	(Japan) M Ayukawa (Japan) K Takahata	2	6	[11]
2	(United Kingdom) N Broady (Czech Republic) Kr Plíšková	6	3	[13]

Quarterfinals
1	(Japan) E Hozumi (Japan) J Namigata	6	4	[11]
Q	(Japan) E Sema (Japan) Y Sema	3	6	[9]
4	(Belgium) A-S Mestach (United Kingdom) E Webley-Smith	6	6
WC	(Japan) Y Nakano (Ukraine) M Zakarlyuk	4	2
(Japan) M Eguchi (Japan) R Sawayanagi	3	6^{4}
3	(Japan) M Miyamura (Thailand) Vara Wongteanchai	6	7^{7}
(Japan) M Inoue (Japan) A Omae	5	6	[6]
2	(United Kingdom) N Broady (Czech Republic) Kr Plíšková	7	4	[10]

Semifinals
1	(Japan) E Hozumi (Japan) J Namigata	5	7	[10]
4	(Belgium) A-S Mestach (United Kingdom) E Webley-Smith	7	5	[5]
3	(Japan) M Miyamura (Thailand) Vara Wongteanchai	2	4
2	(United Kingdom) N Broady (Czech Republic) Kr Plíšková	6	6

Final
1	(Japan) E Hozumi (Japan) J Namigata	3	4
2	(United Kingdom) N Broady (Czech Republic) Kr Plíšková	6	6
