= 2014 Fukuoka International Women's Cup – Singles =

Singles
- 2014 Fukuoka International Women's Cup

Final
- Champion: (United Kingdom) Naomi Broady
- Runner-up: (Czech Republic) Kristýna Plíšková
- Score: 5–7, 6–3, 6–4

Events
| Singles | Doubles |
| ← 2013 · | Fukuoka International Women's Cup | · 2015 → |

Ons Jabeur was the defending champion, having won the event in 2013, but chose to compete at the $25,000 ITF tournament in Tunis.

Naomi Broady won the title, defeating Kristýna Plíšková in the final, 5–7, 6–3, 6–4.

== Seeds ==
1. (Belgium) An-Sophie Mestach (second round)
2. (Czech Republic) Kristýna Plíšková (final)
3. (Japan) Eri Hozumi (first round)
4. (Japan) Erika Sema (quarterfinals)
5. (Japan) ~~Sachie Ishizu~~ (withdrew)
6. (Ukraine) Olga Savchuk (first round)
7. (France) Irena Pavlovic (second round)
8. (Russia) Ekaterina Bychkova (semifinals)
9. (United Kingdom) Naomi Broady (champion)

== Main draw ==
=== Key ===
- Q = Qualifier
- WC = Wild card
- LL = Lucky loser
- Alt = Alternate
- SE = Special exempt
- PR = Protected ranking
- ITF = ITF entry
- JE = Junior exempt
- w/o = Walkover
- r = Retired
- d = Defaulted
- SR = Special ranking

=== Finals ===
Semifinals
(Chinese Taipei) Chan Yung-jan | 3 | 3
9 | (United Kingdom) Naomi Broady | 6 | 6
8 | (Russia) Ekaterina Bychkova | 4 | 4
2 | (Czech Republic) Kristýna Plíšková | 6 | 6

Final
9 | (United Kingdom) Naomi Broady | 5 | 6 | 6
2 | (Czech Republic) Kristýna Plíšková | 7 | 3 | 4

=== Top half ===
First round
1 | (Belgium) A-S Mestach | 6^{4} | 6 | 6
Q | (Japan) M Inoue | 7^{7} | 2 | 2
(Japan) M Tanaka | 0 | 3
(Chinese Taipei) Y-j Chan | 6 | 6
Q | (Australia) M Adamczak | 5 | 2
(Japan) M Imanishi | 7 | 6
(United Kingdom) S Murray | 6 | 5 | 4
7 | (France) I Pavlovic | 4 | 7 | 6
4 | (Japan) E Sema | 6 | 6
WC | (Japan) N Osaka | 3 | 3
(China) Q Wang | 6 | 6
WC | (Japan) M Kato | 4 | 4
(Australia) Ar Rodionova | 6^{2} | 2
(Japan) J Namigata | 7^{7} | 6
(United Kingdom) J Windley | 2 | 1
9 | (United Kingdom) N Broady | 6 | 6

Second round
1 | (Belgium) A-S Mestach | 2 | 7 | 6^{8}
(Chinese Taipei) Y-j Chan | 6 | 5 | 7^{10}
(Japan) M Imanishi | 6 | 4 | 6
7 | (France) I Pavlovic | 2 | 6 | 2
4 | (Japan) E Sema | 7^{8} | 3 | 6
(China) Q Wang | 6^{6} | 6 | 3
(Japan) J Namigata | 6 | 6^{12} | 4
9 | (United Kingdom) N Broady | 3 | 7^{14} | 6

Quarterfinals
(Chinese Taipei) Y-j Chan | 7^{9} | 6
(Japan) M Imanishi | 6^{7} | 3
4 | (Japan) E Sema | 6^{5} | 3
9 | (United Kingdom) N Broady | 7^{7} | 6

Semifinals
(Chinese Taipei) Y-j Chan | 3 | 3
9 | (United Kingdom) N Broady | 6 | 6

=== Bottom half ===
First round
8 | (Russia) E Bychkova | 6 | 5 | 6
(United Kingdom) T Moore | 4 | 7 | 3
(Australia) S Sanders | 5 | 4
LL | (United States) T Kinard | 7 | 6
(Japan) S Aoyama | 6 | 6
Q | (Montenegro) A Veselinović | 3 | 3
(Australia) J Gajdošová | 6^{6} | 6 | 6
3 | (Japan) E Hozumi | 7^{8} | 4 | 4
6 | (Ukraine) O Savchuk | 1 | 2
WC | (Thailand) T Tanasugarn | 6 | 6
(Greece) E Daniilidou | 4 | 3
Q | (Japan) Y Tanaka | 6 | 6
(Japan) N Hibino | 6 | 7
WC | (Japan) R Sawayanagi | 3 | 5
(Belgium) Y Bonaventure | 2 | 4
2 | (Czech Republic) Kr Plíšková | 6 | 6

Second round
8 | (Russia) E Bychkova | 7^{7} | 6
LL | (United States) T Kinard | 6^{4} | 0
(Japan) S Aoyama | 7^{7} | 6
(Australia) J Gajdošová | 6^{3} | 4
WC | (Thailand) T Tanasugarn | 6 | 7^{7}
Q | (Japan) Y Tanaka | 1 | 6^{1}
(Japan) N Hibino | 4 | 3
2 | (Czech Republic) Kr Plíšková | 6 | 6

Quarterfinals
8 | (Russia) E Bychkova | 1 | 6 | 6
(Japan) S Aoyama | 6 | 2 | 2
WC | (Thailand) T Tanasugarn | 6 | 4 | 2
2 | (Czech Republic) Kr Plíšková | 4 | 6 | 6

Semifinals
8 | (Russia) E Bychkova | 4 | 4
2 | (Czech Republic) Kr Plíšková | 6 | 6
