= Kristýna Plíšková =

Czech tennis player (born 1992)

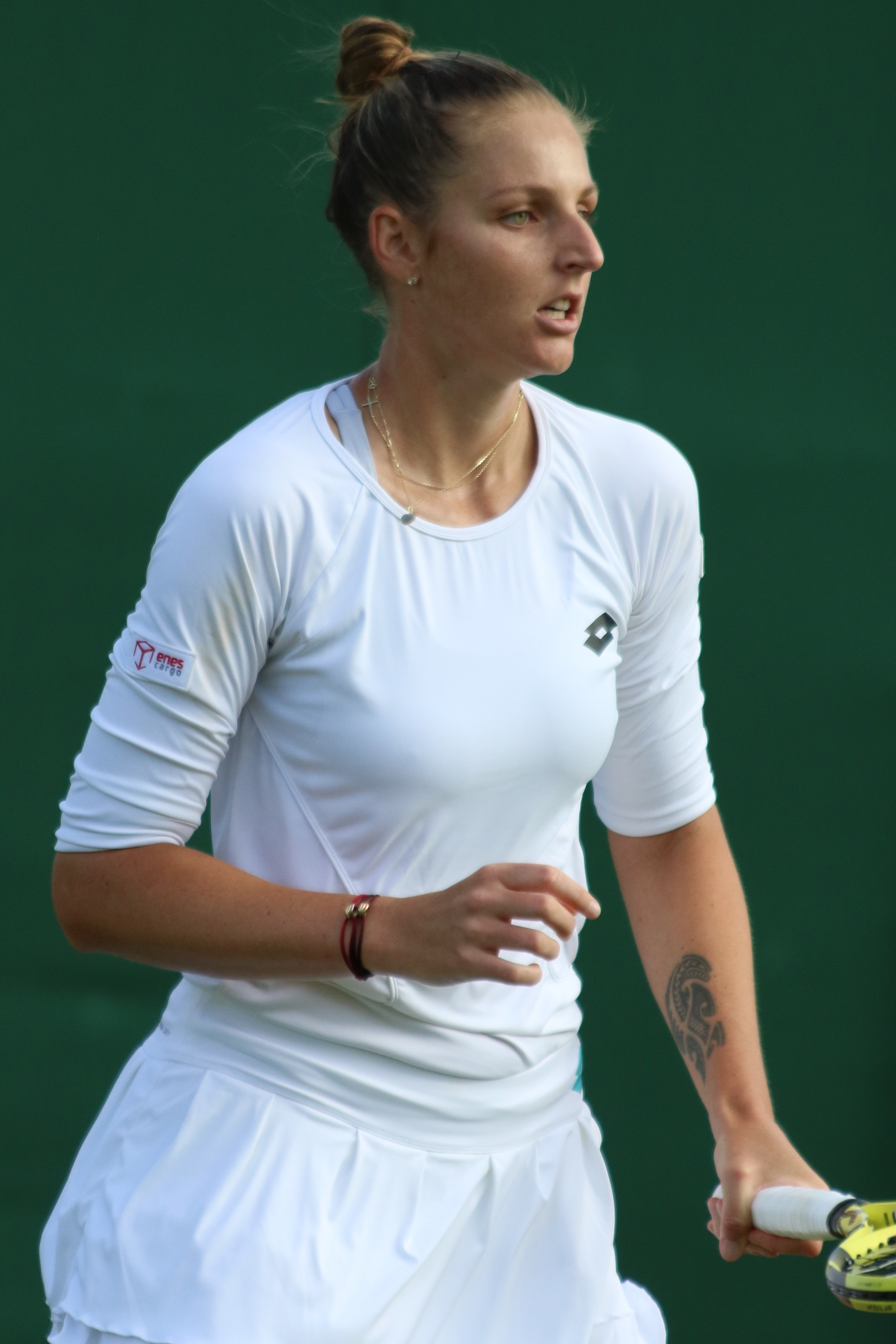
- Plíšková at the 2019 Wimbledon Championships
- Country (sports): Czech Republic
- Residence: Prague, Czech Republic
- Born: 21 March 1992 (age 34) Louny, Czechoslovakia
- Height: 1.84 m (6 ft 0 in)
- Turned pro: 2009
- Plays: Left (two-handed backhand)
- Coach: Jaroslav Levinský
- Prize money: US$ 3,517,903
- Official website: pliskova.net

Singles
- Career record: 409–345
- Career titles: 1
- Highest ranking: No. 35 (31 July 2017)

Grand Slam singles results
- Australian Open: 3R (2017)
- French Open: 2R (2020)
- Wimbledon: 3R (2015)
- US Open: 2R (2012, 2017, 2019, 2021)

Doubles
- Career record: 167–137
- Career titles: 5
- Highest ranking: No. 44 (14 June 2021)

Grand Slam doubles results
- Australian Open: 3R (2017)
- French Open: QF (2021)
- Wimbledon: 1R (2014, 2017)
- US Open: 1R (2012, 2014, 2017)

Team competitions
- Fed Cup: 0–1

Kristýna Plíšková (Czech pronunciation: [ˈkrɪstiːna ˈpliːʃkovaː]; born 21 March 1992) is a Czech former professional tennis player. In her career, she won one singles title and five doubles titles on the WTA Tour, with three WTA 125 titles (two in doubles). She also won nine singles and eight doubles titles on the ITF Circuit. On 31 July 2017, she reached her career-high singles ranking of world No. 35. On 14 June 2021, she peaked at No. 44 in the WTA doubles rankings. Plíšková won the 2010 Wimbledon Championships junior tournament, beating Sachie Ishizu in straight sets. She currently holds the record for the most aces (31) in a match on the WTA Tour, which she set in a second-round match against Monica Puig at the 2016 Australian Open.

== Personal life ==
Plíšková was born to Radek Plíšek and Martina Plíšková in Louny, and has an identical twin sister, Karolína, who is also a tennis player, and a former world No. 1. On 6 December 2021, Plíšková posted on her Instagram that she was excited to be expecting a baby with footballer Dávid Hancko. On 31 May 2022, they announced on their social accounts the birth of their son, who was named Adam.

== Career ==
=== Juniors ===
Plíšková began competing professionally in 2005. She played her first ITF Junior Circuit final at the Malta ITF Junior Tournament in 2006, losing to Cristina Sánchez Quintanar. She made her major debut at the 2010 Australian Open and reached the semifinals. She defeated the top seed, Tímea Babos, in the quarterfinals but then lost to Laura Robson. Robson was eventually beaten in the final by Plíšková's twin sister Karolína. At the 2010 French Open, Kristýna was defeated by Danka Kovinić in the first round. She then went on to win the Eastbourne International junior tournament, beating Tara Moore. Plíšková eventually won the Wimbledon girls' singles, defeating Sachie Ishizu in the final.

=== 2006–2009 ===
Plíšková played her first WTA Tour qualifying at the 2006 Prague Open losing to Kirsten Flipkens. She proceeded with competing on the ITF Circuit.

In 2007, Plíšková was awarded a wildcard at the Prague Open but lost to top seed Marion Bartoli. She also competed in the doubles event with her sister Karolína, but they lost to fellow Czechs, Lucie Hradecká and Renata Voráčová, in the first round.

In 2008, she won a wildcard for the Prague Open in both singles and doubles. In singles, she fell to Roberta Vinci in straight sets.

In 2009, Plíšková reached her first ITF Circuit singles final in Pesaro, but was defeated by Anastasia Grymalska.

=== 2010 ===
Plíšková won her first title in May at the Kurume Cup in Japan, beating her sister in the final. At the Prague Open, she lost to the fifth seed Anabel Medina Garrigues in the first round. In doubles, she and her sister lost to Klaudia Jans and Alicja Rosolska in the opening round. She then played her first ladies' major event at the US Open and defeated Lauren Albanese and Arantxa Rus, before losing to Lourdes Domínguez Lino in the final qualifying round.

=== 2011 ===
Plíšková was given a wildcard into the qualifying rounds of Wimbledon. She defeated all three of her opponents to enter her first career main draw of a Grand Slam tournament.

=== 2012 ===
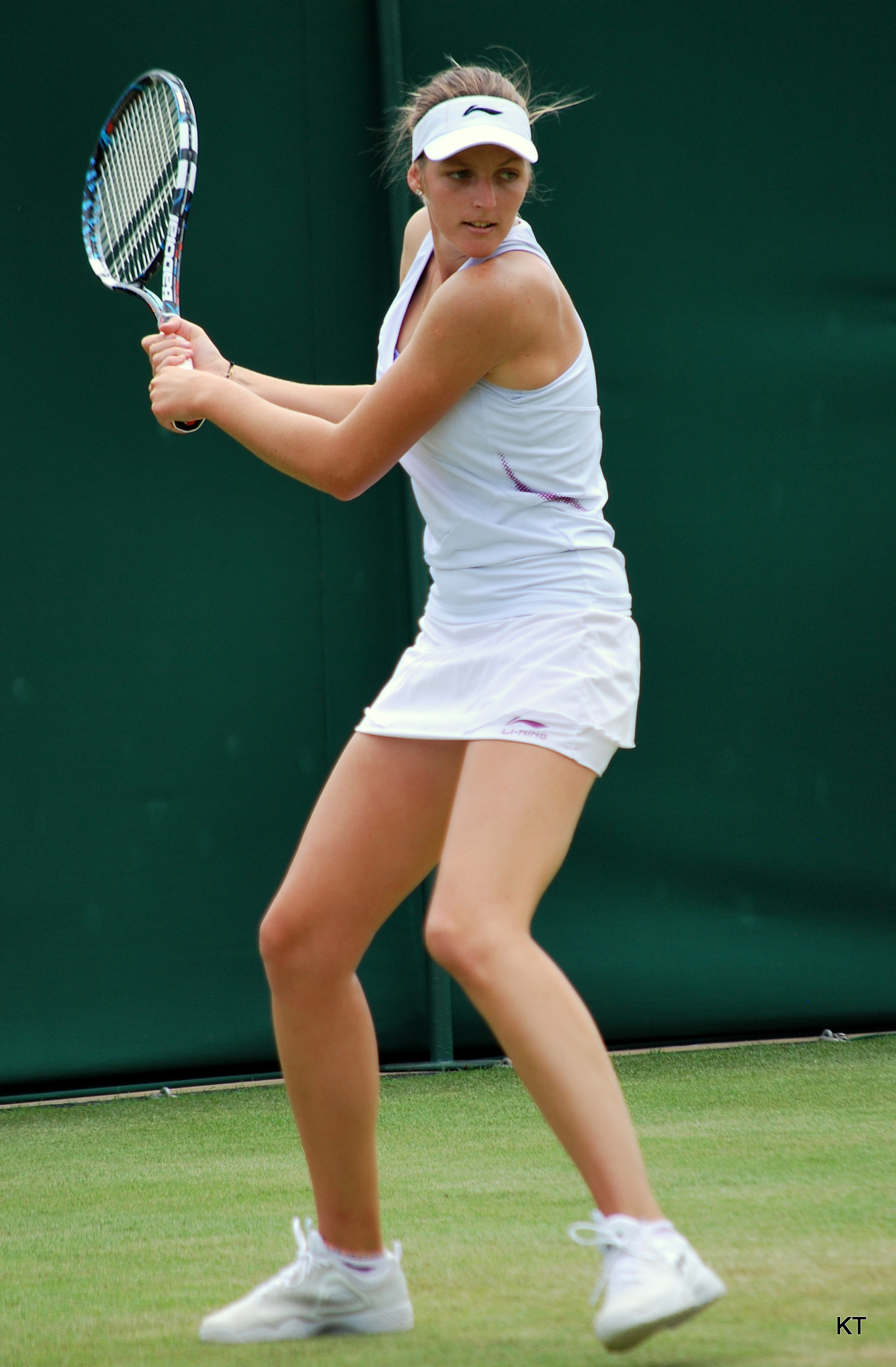
Plíšková at the 2012 Wimbledon Championships

Plíšková qualified for the Wimbledon Championships and won her first Grand Slam main-draw match against Polona Hercog. However, in round two, she lost to 24th seed Francesca Schiavone, in straight sets. She then qualified for the US Open where she upset 18th seed Julia Görges in the first round; but again, failed to make it past the second round, losing to Mandy Minella.

=== 2013 ===
Plíšková began her season at the Brisbane International. She lost in the final round of qualifying to Australian wildcard Bojana Bobusic. At the Sydney International, Plíšková was defeated in the first round of qualifying by Andrea Hlaváčková. In Melbourne, Plíšková won her first-round match over Australian wildcard Sacha Jones. In the second round, she lost to 27th seed Sorana Cîrstea.

Playing in Paris at the WTA indoor event, Plíšková was defeated in the first round of qualifying by Lara Arruabarrena Vecino. Next, she played at the $25k tournament in Grenoble, France where she lost in the quarterfinals to Sandra Záhlavová. At the Dubai Championships, Plíšková was defeated in the first round of qualifying to Kurumi Nara. Seeded eighth at the Malaysian Open, she lost in the first round to qualifier Zarina Diyas. In Indian Wells, Plíšková was defeated in the first round of qualifying by American wildcard Grace Min. At the Miami Open, she lost in the final round of qualifying to Jana Čepelová. After that, she stayed in Florida to compete at the Oaks Club Challenger where she was beaten in her quarterfinal match by eventual finalist Estrella Cabeza Candela.

Plíšková began the clay-court season at the Charleston Open. She lost in the final round of qualifying to Caroline Garcia. Playing at the first edition of the Katowice Open, she was defeated in the first round by third seed Klára Zakopalová. Seeded second at the first edition of the Lale Cup, Plíšková fell in her quarterfinal match to Ana Vrljić. Seeded fifth at the Slovak Open, she lost in the second round to Kateřina Siniaková.

=== 2014 ===
Plíšková won another two titles on the WTA Tour with her sister Karolína in doubles.

=== 2015 ===
She upset Svetlana Kuznetsova in Wimbledon to reach the third round of a major championship for the first time in her career. However, she went on to lose to Monica Niculescu in the next round.

=== 2016: First WTA Tour title ===
Plíšková defeated Samantha Stosur in the first round of the Australian Open, but lost to Monica Puig after setting a new WTA Tour record for the most aces (31) in a match, but failed to convert five match points. At the Tashkent Open, she went on to win her maiden tour-level title, defeating defending champion Nao Hibino.

=== 2017: Second tour final at home ===
Plíšková started the season at Shenzhen, where she lost to Johanna Konta in three sets in the quarterfinals. In the Australian Open, she went on to lose to world No. 1 and defending champion, Angelique Kerber, in the third round.

She went on to defeat Roberta Vinci in the first round of Dubai Championships, before losing to Lauren Davis in the second, in three sets.

In the Indian Wells Open, she reached the third round, where she faced Dominika Cibulková and dominated the first set 6–2, before losing the last two sets in tiebreaks and having a match point at 5–4 in the deciding set. She lost her opener at the Miami Open to Mandy Minella, also in three sets. At the new WTA Tour event Ladies Open Biel Bienne, she reached the quarterfinals where she lost to her compatriot and later tournament champion, Markéta Vondroušová, in two sets. Plíšková then reached the final of the Prague Open, falling to Mona Barthel there. Then, she won two matches in her other two clay-court events but lost in the first round to Chloé Paquet at the French Open.

She had a decent grass-court season, amassing four wins in the Rosmalen Open, Mallorca Open, Eastbourne International and the Wimbledon Championships. Plíšková then proceeded to reach the final of an $80k event back home in Prague, but then cut her finger on an electric fan at the Jiangxi International Open, which resulted in her having to withdraw from her next two events. She returned to action in the Connecticut Open, losing to eventual champion Daria Gavrilova. At the US Open, she lost to Magdaléna Rybáriková in the second round.

=== 2019 ===
At the Birmingham Classic, she and her sister Karolína became the first identical twins in WTA Tour history to play each other in a main-draw match. Kristýna beat her sister, who was ranked over 100 places above her.

=== 2021: First major quarterfinal in doubles ===
Plíšková started her 2021 season at the first edition of the Yarra Valley Classic where she lost in the first round to Vera Zvonareva, in three sets. At the Australian Open, she was defeated in the first round by Heather Watson.

Getting past qualifying at the Qatar Ladies Open, Plíšková was eliminated in the first round by Anastasia Pavlyuchenkova. In Dubai, she was beaten in the first round by qualifier Tereza Martincová. At the Miami Open, she fell in the first round to Katie Boulter.

Plíšková began her clay-court season at the first edition of the Serbia Open where she lost in the first round to Océane Dodin. Competing in Strasbourg, she was defeated in the first round by Alizé Cornet. At the French Open, she was eliminated in the first round by eventual champion Barbora Krejčíková. In doubles, she partnered with her twin sister, Karolína. They reached the quarterfinals of a major for the first time in their career. As a result, Kristýna reached a career-high ranking of 44 in doubles.

She reached second round of Wimbledon and US Open, losing to Anastasia Pavlyuchenkova and Petra Kvitová respectively. Added two quarterfinals in Belgrade and Cluj.

She has been inactive since she lost first round of Astana Open to seventh seed Varvara Gracheva.

She finished the season ranked as No. 146 in the world in singles and No. 139 in doubles.

== Performance timelines ==
Key
W	F	SF	QF	#R	RR	Q#	P#	DNQ	A	Z#	PO	G	S	B	NMS	NTI	P	NH

(W) winner; (F) finalist; (SF) semifinalist; (QF) quarterfinalist; (#R) rounds 4, 3, 2, 1; (RR) round-robin stage; (Q#) qualification round; (P#) preliminary round; (DNQ) did not qualify; (A) absent; (Z#) Davis/Fed Cup Zonal Group (with number indication) or (PO) play-off; (G) gold, (S) silver or (B) bronze Olympic/Paralympic medal; (NMS) not a Masters tournament; (NTI) not a Tier I tournament; (P) postponed; (NH) not held; (SR) strike rate (events won / competed); (W–L) win–loss record.
To avoid confusion and double counting, these charts are updated at the conclusion of a tournament or when the player's participation has ended.

Only main-draw results in WTA Tour, Grand Slam tournaments, Billie Jean King Cup, United Cup, Hopman Cup and Olympic Games are included in win–loss records.

=== Singles ===
Tournament	2007	2008	2009	2010	2011	2012	2013	2014	2015	2016	2017	2018	2019	2020	2021	SR	W–L	Win %
Grand Slam tournaments
Australian Open	A	A	A	A	Q1	Q1	2R	Q2	Q1	2R	3R	1R	2R	1R	1R	0 / 7	5–7	42%
French Open	A	A	A	A	Q1	Q1	1R	Q1	Q1	1R	1R	1R	1R	2R	1R	0 / 7	1–7	13%
Wimbledon	A	A	A	A	1R	2R	1R	1R	3R	1R	2R	1R	1R	NH	2R	0 / 10	5–10	33%
US Open	A	A	A	Q3	Q3	2R	Q2	1R	Q1	Q2	2R	1R	2R	1R	2R	0 / 7	4–7	36%
Win–Loss	0–0	0–0	0–0	0–0	0–1	2–2	1–3	0–2	2–1	1–3	4–4	0–4	2–4	1–3	2–4	0 / 31	15–31	33%
WTA 1000 + former^{†} tournaments
Qatar Open	NTI	A	Not Held		NTI	A	A	Q2	NTI	A	NTI	A	NTI	Q1	NTI	0 / 0	0–0	–
Dubai Championships	NTI		A	A	A	Not Tier I			A	NTI	2R	NTI	Q1	NTI	1R	0 / 2	1–2	33%
Indian Wells Open	A	A	A	A	A	A	Q1	A	A	1R	3R	2R	Q1	NH	A	0 / 3	3–3	50%
Miami Open	A	A	A	A	A	A	Q2	A	A	3R	1R	1R	1R	NH	1R	0 / 5	2–5	29%
Madrid Open	Not Held		A	A	A	A	A	A	A	Q1	1R	3R	2R	NH	A	0 / 3	3–3	50%
Italian Open	A	A	A	A	A	A	A	A	A	A	A	A	Q2	A	A	0 / 0	0–0	–
Canadian Open	A	A	A	A	A	A	A	Q1	A	A	A	A	A	NH	A	0 / 0	0–0	–
Cincinnati Open	Not Tier I		A	A	A	A	A	Q1	Q1	A	A	A	Q2	A	A	0 / 0	0–0	–
China Open	Not Tier I		A	A	A	A	A	A	A	A	1R	A	A	Not Held		0 / 1	0–1	0%
Wuhan Open	Not Held							Q2	A	A	A	A	A	Not Held		0 / 0	0–0	–
Pan Pacific Open^{†}	A	A	A	A	1R	A	Q2	Not Tier I						Not Held		0 / 1	0–1	0%
Win–Loss	0–0	0–0	0–0	0–0	0–1	0–0	0–0	0–0	0–0	2–2	3–5	3–3	1–2	0–0	0–2	0 / 15	9–15	–
Career statistics
Tournaments	1	1	0	2	5	3	10	10	4	15	23	22	21	8	15	Career total: 140		
Titles	0	0	0	0	0	0	0	0	0	1	0	0	0	0	0	Career total: 1		
Finals	0	0	0	0	0	0	0	0	0	1	1	0	0	0	0	Career total: 2		
Overall Win–Loss	0–1	0–1	0–0	0–2	2–5	3–3	3–10	3–10	2–4	10–14	22–23	14–22	18–21	9–8	5–15	1 / 140	91–139	40%
Year-end ranking	861	753	506	227	179	110	121	123	113	61	61	97	66	69	146	$3,517,903		

== WTA Tour finals ==
=== Singles: 2 (1 title, 1 runner-up) ===
Legend International (1–1)	Finals by surface Hard (1–0) Clay (0–1)

Result	W–L	Date	Tournament	Tier	Surface	Opponent	Score
Win	1–0	Oct 2016	Tashkent Open, Uzbekistan	International	Hard	(Japan) Nao Hibino	6–3, 2–6, 6–3
Loss	1–1	May 2017	Prague Open, Czech Republic	International	Clay	(Germany) Mona Barthel	6–2, 5–7, 2–6

=== Doubles: 6 (5 titles, 1 runner-up) ===
Legend International (5–1)	Finals by surface Hard (2–0) Clay (3–1)

Result	W–L	Date	Tournament	Tier	Surface	Partner	Opponents	Score
Loss	0–1	Jul 2013	Palermo Ladies Open, Italy	International	Clay	(Czech Republic) Karolína Plíšková	(France) Kristina Mladenovic (Poland) Katarzyna Piter	1–6, 7–5, [8–10]
Win	1–1	Oct 2013	Linz Open, Austria	International	Hard (i)	(Czech Republic) Karolína Plíšková	(Canada) Gabriela Dabrowski (Poland) Alicja Rosolska	7–6^{(8–6)}, 6–4
Win	2–1	Jul 2014	Austrian Open, Austria	International	Clay	(Czech Republic) Karolína Plíšková	(Slovenia) Andreja Klepač (Spain) María Teresa Torró Flor	4–6, 6–3, [10–6]
Win	3–1	Sep 2014	Hong Kong Open	International	Hard	(Czech Republic) Karolína Plíšková	(Austria) Patricia Mayr-Achleitner (Australia) Arina Rodionova	6–2, 2–6, [12–10]
Win	4–1	Jul 2019	Bucharest Open, Romania	International	Clay	(Slovakia) Viktória Kužmová	(Romania) Jaqueline Cristian (Romania) Elena-Gabriela Ruse	6–4, 7–6^{(7–3)}
Win	5–1	Aug 2020	Prague Open, Czech Republic	International	Clay	(Czech Republic) Lucie Hradecká	(Romania) Monica Niculescu (Romania) Raluca Olaru	6–2, 6–2

== WTA 125 finals ==
=== Singles: 1 (title) ===
Result	Date	Tournament	Surface	Opponents	Score
Win	Sep 2016	Dalian Open, China	Hard	(Japan) Misa Eguchi	7–5, 4–6, 2–5 ret.

=== Doubles: 2 (2 titles) ===
Result	W–L	Date	Tournament	Surface	Partner	Opponents	Score
Win	1–0	Sep 2018	Chicago Challenger, United States	Hard	(Germany) Mona Barthel	(United States) Asia Muhammad (United States) Maria Sanchez	6–3, 6–2
Win	2–0	Mar 2019	Indian Wells Challenger, United States	Hard	(Russia) Evgeniya Rodina	(United States) Taylor Townsend (Belgium) Yanina Wickmayer	7–6^{(7)}, 6–4

== ITF Circuit finals ==
=== Singles: 17 (9 titles, 8 runner-ups) ===
Legend 75/80K tournaments (1–2) 50K tournaments (4–3) 25K tournaments (4–2) 10K tournaments (0–1)	Finals by surface Hard (5–5) Clay (0–2) Grass (3–1) Carpet (1–0)

Result	W–L	Date	Tournament	Tier	Surface	Opponent	Score
Loss	0–1	Aug 2009	ITF Pesaro, Italy	10K	Clay	(Italy) Anastasia Grymalska	6–2, 1–6, 2–6
Win	1–1	May 2010	Kurume Cup, Japan	50K	Grass	(Czech Republic) Karolína Plíšková	5–7, 6–2, 6–0
Loss	1–2	Feb 2011	ITF Rancho Mirage, United States	25K	Hard	(United States) Ashley Weinhold	3–6, 6–3, 5–7
Win	2–2	Jan 2012	Open Andrézieux-Bouthéon, France	25K	Hard (i)	(Italy) Anna Remondina	6–2, 6–2
Loss	2–3	Feb 2012	Open de l'Isère, France	25K	Hard (i)	(Czech Republic) Karolína Plíšková	6–7^{(11)}, 6–7^{(6)}
Win	3–3	Oct 2013	Open de Limoges, France	50K	Hard (i)	(Austria) Tamira Paszek	3–6, 6–3, 6–2
Loss	3–4	Nov 2013	GB Pro-Series Barnstaple, UK	75K	Hard (i)	(Russia) Marta Sirotkina	7–6^{(5)}, 3–6, 6–7^{(6)}
Win	4–4	Mar 2014	ITF Preston, UK	25K	Hard (i)	(Turkey) Çağla Büyükakçay	6–3, 7–6^{(4)}
Loss	4–5	May 2014	Fukuoka International, Japan	50K	Grass	(United Kingdom) Naomi Broady	7–5, 3–6, 4–6
Win	5–5	Jun 2014	Nottingham Trophy, UK	75K	Grass	(Kazakhstan) Zarina Diyas	6–2, 3–6, 6–4
Win	6–5	Feb 2015	GB Pro-Series Glasgow, UK	25K	Hard (i)	(Romania) Ana Bogdan	6–2, 6–2
Win	7–5	Apr 2015	GB Pro-Series Barnstaple, UK	25K	Hard (i)	(Germany) Nina Zander	6–3, 6–2
Loss	7–6	Apr 2015	Lale Cup, Turkey	50K	Hard	(Israel) Shahar Pe'er	6–1, 6–7^{(4)}, 5–7
Win	8–6	May 2015	Fukuoka International, Japan	50K	Grass	(Japan) Nao Hibino	7–5, 6–4
Loss	8–7	Oct 2015	Open de Touraine, France	50K	Hard (i)	(Ukraine) Olga Fridman	2–6, 6–3, 1–6
Win	9–7	Feb 2016	ITF Kreuzlingen, Switzerland	50K	Carpet (i)	(Switzerland) Amra Sadiković	7–6^{(4)}, 7–6^{(3)}
Loss	9–8	Jul 2017	ITS Cup Olomouc, Czech Republic	80K	Clay	(United States) Bernarda Pera	5–7, 6–4, 3–6

=== Doubles: 13 (8 titles, 5 runner-ups) ===
Legend 100K tournaments (1–1) 75K tournaments (1–1) 50K tournaments (2–2) 25K tournaments (4–1)	Finals by surface Hard (6–4) Grass (1–1) Carpet (1–0)

Result	W–L	Date	Tournament	Tier	Surface	Partner	Opponents	Score
Loss	0–1	May 2010	Kurume Cup, Japan	50K	Grass	(Czech Republic) Karolína Plíšková	(China) Sun Shengnan (China) Xu Yifan	0–6, 3–6
Win	1–1	Feb 2011	ITF Rancho Mirage, United States	25K	Hard	(Czech Republic) Karolína Plíšková	(Russia) Nadejda Guskova (Poland) Sandra Zaniewska	6–7^{(6)}, 6–1, 6–4
Win	2–1	Aug 2011	Vancouver Open, Canada	100K	Hard	(Czech Republic) Karolína Plíšková	(United States) Jamie Hampton (Thailand) Noppawan Lertcheewakarn	5–7, 6–2, 6–4
Loss	2–2	Nov 2011	Taipei Open, Taiwan	100K	Hard (i)	(Czech Republic) Karolína Plíšková	(Chinese Taipei) Chan Yung-jan (China) Zheng Jie	6–7^{(5)}, 7–5, 3–6
Loss	2–3	Nov 2011	ITF Bratislava, Slovakia	25K	Hard (i)	(Czech Republic) Karolína Plíšková	(United Kingdom) Naomi Broady (France) Kristina Mladenovic	7–5, 4–6, [2–10]
Win	3–3	Jan 2012	Open Andrézieux-Bouthéon, France	25K	Hard (i)	(Czech Republic) Karolína Plíšková	(France) Julie Coin (Czech Republic) Eva Hrdinová	6–4, 4–6, [10–5]
Win	4–3	Jan 2012	Open de l'Isère, France	25K	Hard (i)	(Czech Republic) Karolína Plíšková	(Ukraine) Valentyna Ivakhnenko (Ukraine) Maryna Zanevska	6–1, 6–3
Loss	4–4	Sep 2012	GB Pro-Series Shrewsbury, UK	75K	Hard (i)	(Czech Republic) Karolína Plíšková	(Serbia) Vesna Dolonc (Switzerland) Stefanie Vögele	1–6, 7–6^{(3)}, [13–15]
Win	5–4	Nov 2012	ITF Zawada, Poland	25K	Carpet (i)	(Czech Republic) Karolína Plíšková	(Germany) Kristina Barrois (Austria) Sandra Klemenschits	6–3, 6–1
Win	6–4	Nov 2013	GB Pro-Series Barnstaple, UK	75K	Hard (i)	(United Kingdom) Naomi Broady	(Romania) Raluca Olaru (Austria) Tamira Paszek	6–3, 3–6, [10–5]
Loss	6–5	Apr 2014	Seoul Open Challenger, South Korea	50K	Hard	(France) Irena Pavlovic	(Chinese Taipei) Chan Chin-wei (Chinese Taipei) Chuang Chia-jung	4–6, 3–6
Win	7–5	May 2015	Fukuoka International, Japan	50K	Grass	(United Kingdom) Naomi Broady	(Japan) Eri Hozumi (Japan) Junri Namigata	6–3, 6–4
Win	8–5	Jul 2016	Stockton Challenger, United States	50K	Hard	(Belgium) Alison Van Uytvanck	(United States) Robin Anderson (United States) Maegan Manasse	6–2, 6–3

== Junior Grand Slam finals ==
=== Singles: 1 (title) ===
Result	Year	Tournament	Surface	Opponent	Score
Win	2010	Wimbledon	Grass	(Japan) Sachie Ishizu	6–3, 4–6, 6–4

== Wins against top 10 players ==
- She has a 4–9 record against players who were, at the time the match was played, ranked in the top 10.

No.	Player	Rk	Event	Surface	Rd	Score	Rk	Years	Ref
1	(Switzerland) Belinda Bencic	10	Miami Open, United States	Hard	2R	4–1, ret.	101	2016	
2	(Latvia) Jeļena Ostapenko	7	Shenzhen Open, China	Hard	1R	6–1, 6–4	61	2018	
3	(Czech Republic) Petra Kvitová	10	Charleston Open, US	Clay	2R	1–6, 6–1, 6–3	77	2018	
4	(Czech Republic) Karolína Plíšková	3	Birmingham Classic, UK	Grass	2R	6–2, 3–6, 7–6^{(9–7)}	112	2019	

- Key: (Rk) first use, opponent rank; (Rd) round; (Rk) 2nd use, player rank; (Ref) reference; (F) final; (SF) semifinal; (QF) quarterfinal; (#R) rounds 4, 3, 2, 1; (RR) round-robin stage; (Q#) qualifying rounds or stages (3), 2, 1.
