= Indy de Vroome =

Dutch tennis player

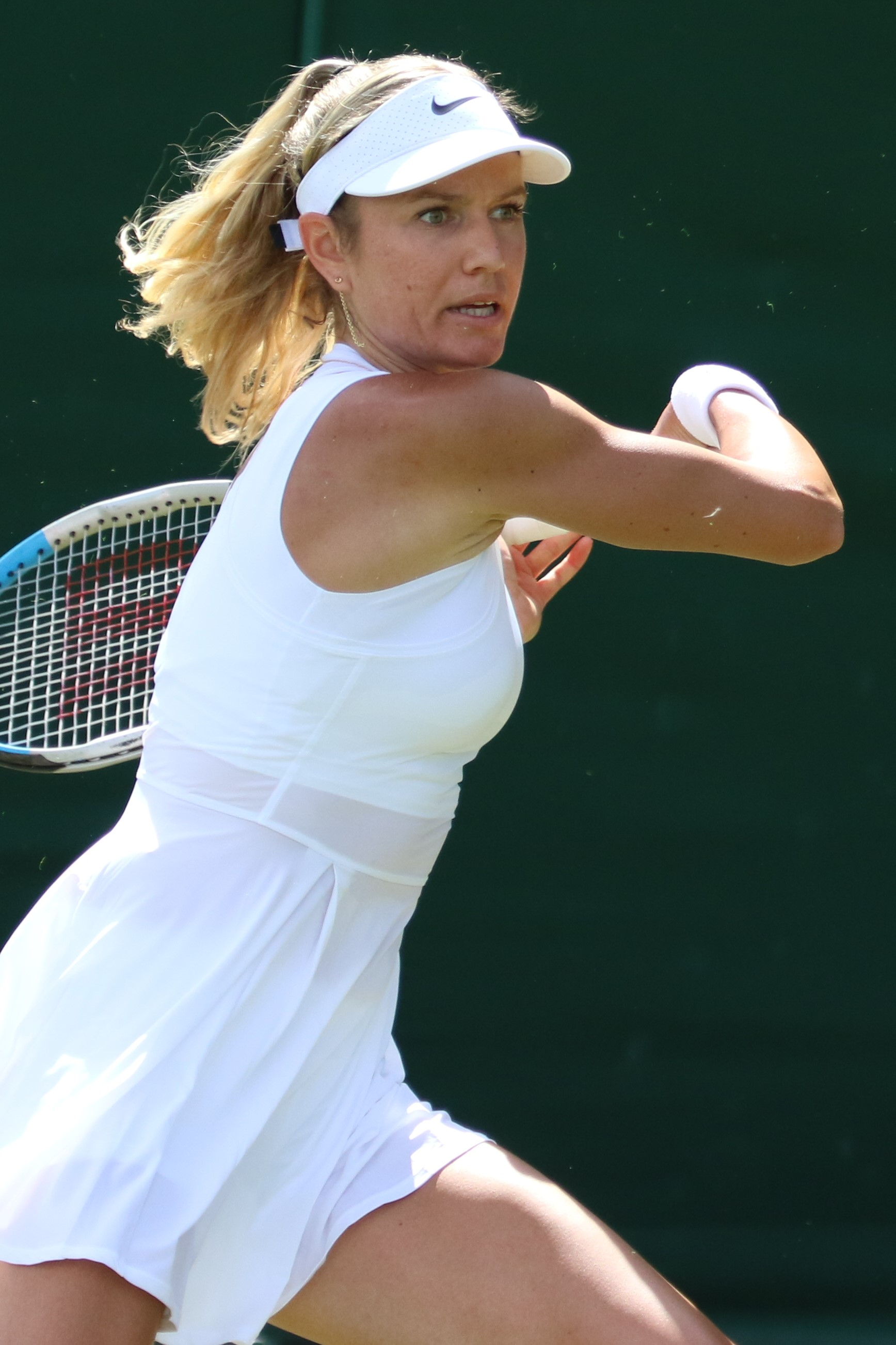
- De Vroome at the 2022 Wimbledon Championships
- Country (sports): Netherlands
- Born: 21 May 1996 (age 30) Cromvoirt, Netherlands
- Prize money: US$ 341,898

Singles
- Career record: 206–167
- Career titles: 7 ITF
- Highest ranking: No. 177 (14 July 2014)

Grand Slam singles results
- Australian Open: Q3 (2022)
- French Open: Q2 (2014)
- Wimbledon: Q2 (2021)
- US Open: Q1 (2014, 2021)

Doubles
- Career record: 57–34
- Career titles: 6 ITF
- Highest ranking: No. 218 (1 August 2016)

Indy de Vroome (born 21 May 1996) is a Dutch inactive tennis player.

De Vroome has won seven singles and six doubles titles on the ITF Women's Circuit. On 14 July 2014, she reached her best singles ranking of world No. 177. On 1 August 2016, she peaked at No. 218 in the doubles rankings.

== Career ==
De Vroome was awarded a wildcard to compete in the qualifying draw of the 2012 Miami Open, but she lost in the first round to Sloane Stephens.

She made her WTA Tour main-draw debut at the 2012 Rosmalen Open.

De Vroome made her debut at a Grand Slam qualifying event in May 2014 at the French Open, defeating former top-30 player Kateryna Bondarenko in straight sets in the first round, but was defeated in round two by third seed Tímea Babos.

At the Diamond Games in February 2015, she achieved her first WTA Tour main-draw match-win by defeating Tsvetana Pironkova in the first round. It was also her first win against a top-50 player.

De Vroome did not play competitive tennis from the summer of 2016 until October 2018 due to Lyme disease. She made a strong come-back in 2019, playing six ITF Circuit finals of which she won four. Her ranking improved from No. 842 in early 2019 to No. 211 in the first week of December of that year.

But since February 2024, there are no more appearances on the tour.

== ITF Circuit finals ==
=== Singles: 15 (7 titles, 8 runner-ups) ===
Legend $60,000 tournaments $25,000 tournaments $10/15,000 tournaments	Finals by surface Hard (4–7) Clay (2–0) Carpet (1–1)

Result	W–L	Date	Tournament	Tier	Surface	Opponent	Score
Win	1–0	Jan 2013	ITF Martinique, France	10,000	Hard	(France) Léa Tholey	6–3, 6–2
Loss	1–1	Apr 2013	ITF Heraklion, Greece	10,000	Carpet	(Netherlands) Michaëlla Krajicek	6–3, 2–6, 4–6
Win	2–1	Oct 2013	Abierto Tampico, Mexico	25,000	Hard	(Serbia) Doroteja Erić	6–4, 6–3
Loss	2–2	Dec 2013	ITF Monterrey, Mexico	25,000	Hard	(Venezuela) Adriana Pérez	6–4, 4–6, 3–6
Loss	2–3	Dec 2013	ITF Mérida, Mexico	25,000	Hard	(Sweden) Rebecca Peterson	5–7, 6–4, 3–6
Win	3–3	Mar 2014	ITF Irapuato, Mexico	25,000	Hard	(Japan) Naomi Osaka	3–6, 6–4, 6–1
Loss	3–4	Feb 2016	Open de l'Isère, France	25,000	Hard (i)	(France) Myrtille Georges	6–7^{(4)}, 2–6
Loss	3–5	Mar 2019	ITF Sharm El Sheik, Egypt	15,000	Hard	(Germany) Julia Wachaczyk	3–6, 2–6
Win	4–5	May 2019	ITF Antalya, Turkey	15,000	Clay	(India) Jennifer Luikham	6–1, 6–0
Win	5–5	Sep 2019	Verbier Open, Switzerland	25,000	Clay	(Latvia) Diāna Marcinkēviča	3–6, 6–3, 7–6^{(2)}
Loss	5–6	Sep 2019	ITF Roehampton, England	25,000	Hard	(Germany) Anna-Lena Friedsam	3–6, 3–6
Win	6–6	Oct 2019	Challenger de Saguenay, Canada	60,000	Hard (i)	(United States) Robin Anderson	3–6, 6–4, 7–5
Win	7–6	Dec 2019	ITF Solarino, Italy	25,000	Carpet	(Poland) Urszula Radwańska	6–1, 6–2
Loss	7–7	Feb 2020	Japan Indoor Championships	60,000	Hard	(China) Xun Fangying	6–3, 3–6, 6–7^{(6)}
Loss	7–8	Oct 2021	ITF Istanbul, Turkey	25,000	Hard (i)	(Germany) Eva Lys	3–6, 6–7^{(4)}

=== Doubles: 8 (6 titles, 2 runner-ups) ===
Legend $50,000 tournaments $25,000 tournaments $10,000 tournaments	Finals by surface Hard (4–2) Carpet (2–0)

Result	W–L	Date	Tournament	Tier	Surface	Partner	Opponents	Score
Win	1–0	Jan 2013	ITF Fort-de-France, Martinique	10,000	Hard	(United States) Denise Starr	(France) Sherazad Benamar (France) Brandy Mina	6–4, 6–3
Win	2–0	Apr 2013	ITF Heraklion, Greece	10,000	Carpet	(Netherlands) Michaëlla Krajicek	(Netherlands) Rosalie van der Hoek (Japan) Yuka Mori	6–0, 5–7, [10–8]
Loss	2–1	Nov 2013	Internacional de Monterrey, Mexico	25,000	Hard	(Slovakia) Lenka Wienerová	(Argentina) Florencia Molinero (Brazil) Laura Pigossi	5–7, 5–7
Win	3–1	Mar 2014	ITF Irapuato, Mexico	25,000	Hard	(United States) Denise Muresan	(Russia) Irina Khromacheva (Germany) Anna Zaja	6–4, 5–7, [10–7]
Win	4–1	Aug 2015	ITF Westende, Belgium	25,000	Hard	(Netherlands) Lesley Kerkhove	(India) Ankita Raina (Ukraine) Alyona Sotnikova	7–6^{(4)}, 6–4
Win	5–1	Jan 2016	ITF Bertioga, Brazil	25,000	Hard	(Romania) Cristina Dinu	(Poland) Katarzyna Kawa (Poland) Sandra Zaniewska	6–3, 6–3
Win	6–1	May 2016	Fukuoka International, Japan	50,000	Carpet	(Bulgaria) Aleksandrina Naydenova	(Uzbekistan) Nigina Abduraimova (Russia) Ksenia Lykina	6–4, 6–1
Loss	6–2	Nov 2023	ITF Ortisei, Italy	25,000	Hard (i)	(Serbia) Katarina Kozarov	(Italy) Anastasia Abbagnato (Latvia) Kamilla Bartone	4–6, 2–6
