= Fukuoka International Women's Cup =

- 2024 Fukuoka International Women's Cup

ITF Women's Tour
- Location: Fukuoka, Japan
- Category: ITF Women's Circuit
- Surface: Carpet
- Draw: 32S/32Q/16D
- Prize money: $60,000
- Website: Official website

The Fukuoka International Women's Cup is a tennis tournament in Fukuoka, Japan, played on outdoor carpet courts. Held since 2001 (until 2012 on grass courts), this ITF Circuit event is a $60,000 tournament.

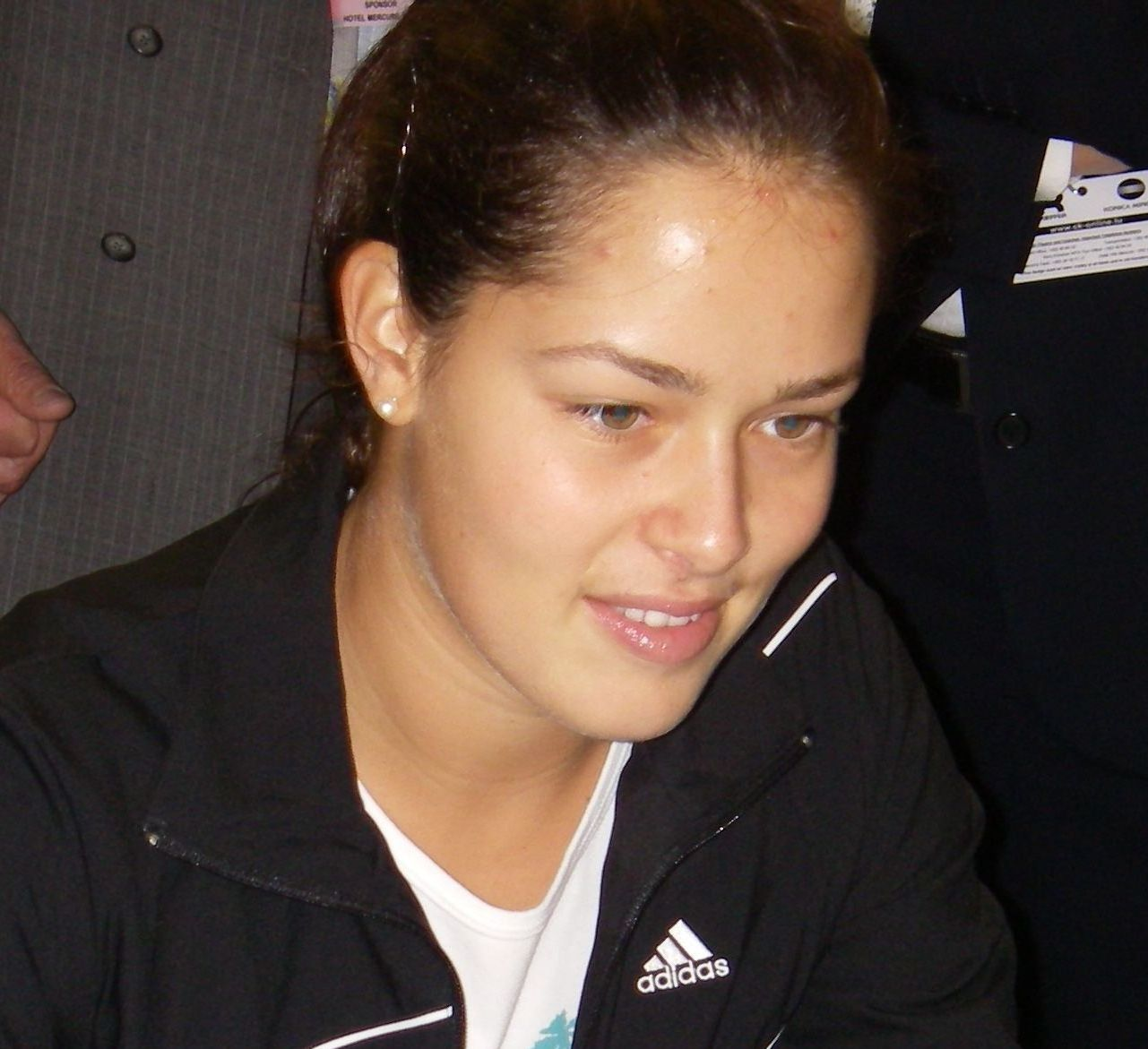
Ana Ivanovic was the winner of the 2004 edition

== Past finals ==
=== Singles ===
| Year | Champion | Runner-up | Score |
|---|---|---|---|
| 2026 | (United Kingdom) Katie Swan | (Japan) Rina Saigo | 6–1, 6–3 |
| 2025 | (Australia) Emerson Jones | (Japan) Himeno Sakatsume | 7–6^{(4)}, 6–4 |
| 2024 | (Australia) Kimberly Birrell | (United States) Emina Bektas | 6–2, 6–4 |
| 2023 | (Japan) Natsumi Kawaguchi | (United Kingdom) Katie Boulter | w/o |
| 2020–22 | Tournament cancelled due to the COVID-19 pandemic | | |
| 2019 | (United Kingdom) Heather Watson | (Kazakhstan) Zarina Diyas | 7–6^{(1)}, 7–6^{(4)} |
| 2018 | (United Kingdom) Katie Boulter | (Russia) Ksenia Lykina | 5–7, 6–4, 6–2 |
| 2017 | (Slovakia) Magdaléna Rybáriková | (South Korea) Jang Su-jeong | 6–2, 6–3 |
| 2016 | (Russia) Ksenia Lykina | (Japan) Kyōka Okamura | 6–2, 6–7^{(2)}, 6–0 |
| 2015 | (Czech Republic) Kristýna Plíšková | (Japan) Nao Hibino | 7–5, 6–4 |
| 2014 | (United Kingdom) Naomi Broady | (Czech Republic) Kristýna Plíšková | 5–7, 6–3, 6–4 |
| 2013 | (Tunisia) Ons Jabeur | (Belgium) An-Sophie Mestach | 7–6^{(2)}, 6–2 |
| 2012 | (Australia) Casey Dellacqua | (Australia) Monique Adamczak | 6–4, 6–1 |
| 2011 | (Thailand) Tamarine Tanasugarn | (Chinese Taipei) Chan Yung-jan | 6–4, 5–7, 7–5 |
| 2010 | (Japan) Junri Namigata | (Austria) Nikola Hofmanova | 6–1, 6–2 |
| 2009 | (Austria) Nikola Hofmanova | (Chinese Taipei) Chang Kai-chen | 6–3, 6–2 |
| 2008 | (Japan) Tomoko Yonemura | (Thailand) Tamarine Tanasugarn | 6–1, 2–6, 7–6^{(8)} |
| 2007 | (Chinese Taipei) Chan Yung-jan | (Australia) Casey Dellacqua | 6–4, 6–4 |
| 2006 | (Chinese Taipei) Chan Yung-jan | (Japan) Ayumi Morita | 6–3, 4–6, 6–1 |
| 2005 | (Chinese Taipei) Chan Yung-jan | (Japan) Ayumi Morita | 6–3, 6–2 |
| 2004 | (Serbia and Montenegro) Ana Ivanovic | (Slovakia) Jarmila Gajdošová | 6–2, 6–7^{(4)}, 7–6^{(4)} |
| 2003 | (Japan) Saori Obata | (Italy) Maria Elena Camerin | 2–6, 6–3, 6–3 |
| 2002 | (Canada) Vanessa Webb | (South Korea) Jeon Mi-ra | 6–0, 6–4 |
| 2001 | (Australia) Alicia Molik | (Japan) Saori Obata | 7–5, 6–3 |

=== Doubles ===
| Year | Champions | Runners-up | Score |
|---|---|---|---|
| 2026 | (Japan) Ayumi Miyamoto (Japan) Hikaru Sato | (Japan) Mayuka Aikawa (Japan) Natsuki Yoshimoto | 6–1, 6–4 |
| 2025 | (Japan) Momoko Kobori (Japan) Ayano Shimizu | (Japan) Miho Kuramochi (Japan) Akiko Omae | 4–6, 6–2, [10–8] |
| 2024 | (India) Rutuja Bhosale (New Zealand) Paige Hourigan | (Japan) Haruna Arakawa (Japan) Aoi Ito | 3–6, 6–3, [10–6] |
| 2023 | (United States) Emina Bektas (Israel) Lina Glushko | (China) Ma Yexin (Australia) Alana Parnaby | 7–5, 6–3 |
| 2020–22 | Tournament cancelled due to the COVID-19 pandemic | | |
| 2019 | (United Kingdom) Naomi Broady (United Kingdom) Heather Watson | (United States) Kristie Ahn (Australia) Alison Bai | w/o |
| 2018 | (United Kingdom) Naomi Broady (United States) Asia Muhammad | (United Kingdom) Tara Moore (Switzerland) Amra Sadiković | 6–2, 6–0 |
| 2017 | (Japan) Junri Namigata (Japan) Kotomi Takahata | (Japan) Erina Hayashi (Japan) Robu Kajitani | 6–0, 6–7^{(3)}, [10–7] |
| 2016 | (Netherlands) Indy de Vroome (Bulgaria) Aleksandrina Naydenova | (Uzbekistan) Nigina Abduraimova (Russia) Ksenia Lykina | 6–4, 6–1 |
| 2015 | (United Kingdom) Naomi Broady (Czech Republic) Kristýna Plíšková | (Japan) Eri Hozumi (Japan) Junri Namigata | 6–3, 6–4 |
| 2014 | (Japan) Shuko Aoyama (Japan) Eri Hozumi | (United Kingdom) Naomi Broady (Greece) Eleni Daniilidou | 6–3, 6–4 |
| 2013 | (Japan) Junri Namigata (Japan) Erika Sema | (Japan) Rika Fujiwara (Japan) Akiko Omae | 7–5, 3–6, [10–7] |
| 2012 | (Australia) Monique Adamczak (Australia) Stephanie Bengson | (Japan) Misa Eguchi (Japan) Akiko Omae | 6–4, 6–4 |
| 2011 | (Japan) Shuko Aoyama (Japan) Rika Fujiwara | (Japan) Aiko Nakamura (Japan) Junri Namigata | 7–6^{(3)}, 6–0 |
| 2010 | (Japan) Misaki Doi (Japan) Kotomi Takahata | (New Zealand) Marina Erakovic (Russia) Alexandra Panova | 6–4, 6–4 |
| 2009 | (Japan) Akiko Yonemura (Japan) Tomoko Yonemura | (Japan) Ayaka Maekawa (Japan) Junri Namigata | 6–2, 6–7^{(3)}, [10–3] |
| 2008 | (United Kingdom) Melanie South (Netherlands) Nicole Thijssen | (Japan) Maya Kato (Australia) Julia Moriarty | 4–6, 6–3, [14–12] |
| 2007 | (Japan) Ayumi Morita (Japan) Akiko Yonemura | (Japan) Rika Fujiwara (Japan) Junri Namigata | 6–2, 6–2 |
| 2006 | (Chinese Taipei) Chan Yung-jan (Chinese Taipei) Chuang Chia-jung | (New Zealand) Leanne Baker (Australia) Christina Horiatopoulos | 6–1, 6–2 |
| 2005 | (Japan) Ryoko Fuda (Japan) Seiko Okamoto | (Chinese Taipei) Chan Yung-jan (Chinese Taipei) Chuang Chia-jung | 6–2, 7–6^{(1)} |
| 2004 | (Japan) Rika Fujiwara (Japan) Saori Obata | (Australia) Monique Adamczak (Australia) Nicole Kriz | 6–2, 6–4 |
| 2003 | (Latvia) Līga Dekmeijere (Japan) Nana Miyagi | (Japan) Rika Fujiwara (Japan) Saori Obata | 6–2, 2–6, 6–4 |
| 2002 | (Japan) Shinobu Asagoe (South Korea) Cho Yoon-jeong | (United Kingdom) Julie Pullin (United Kingdom) Lorna Woodroffe | 6–2, 6–4 |
| 2001 | (Japan) Rika Hiraki (Japan) Nana Miyagi | (United Kingdom) Julie Pullin (United Kingdom) Lorna Woodroffe | 6–0, 7–6^{(3)} |
