= Aleksandrina Naydenova =

Bulgarian tennis player

Aleksandrina Naydenova Александрина Найденова
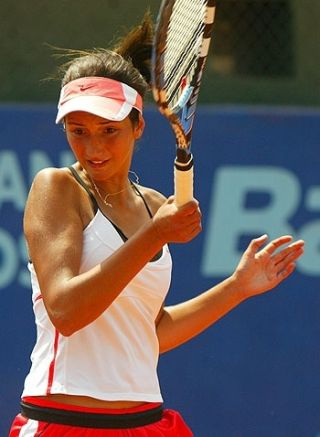
- Naydenova in 2010
- Country (sports): Bulgaria
- Born: 29 February 1992 (age 34) Plovdiv
- Height: 1.70 m (5 ft 7 in)
- Turned pro: 2007
- Retired: 2020
- Plays: Right (two-handed backhand)
- Prize money: $237,920

Singles
- Career record: 336–269
- Career titles: 10 ITF
- Highest ranking: No. 218 (9 September 2019)

Grand Slam singles results
- Australian Open: Q1 (2017)

Doubles
- Career record: 213–183
- Career titles: 14 ITF
- Highest ranking: No. 95 (25 September 2017)

Grand Slam doubles results
- Australian Open: 1R (2014)

Aleksandrina Naydenova (Bulgarian: Александрина Найденова; born 29 February 1992) is a Bulgarian former professional tennis player.

On 9 September 2019, she reached her highest singles ranking of 218 by the WTA whilst her best doubles ranking was No. 95, achieved on 25 September 2017.

== Suspension and ban ==
On 27 December 2019, Naydenova was given a provisional suspension by the Tennis Integrity Unit (TIU) for several cases of suspected match-fixing between 2015 and 2019. After months of appealing in to the TIU in the Independent Anti-Corruption Hearing, in late November 2020, Naydenova was banned from professional tennis for life for 13 charges; 12 cases of match-fixing across WTA Tour and ITF Women's Circuit, and one relating to numerous incidents of non-cooperation with the TIU during the investigation process. The then 28-year-old from Plovdiv was also fined US$150,000. She was ranked No. 239 in singles at the time of her suspension.

== Career statistics ==
=== WTA 125 finals ===
==== Doubles: 1 (runner-up) ====
Result	Date	Tournament	Surface	Partner	Opponents	Score
Loss	Jun 2017	Bol Ladies Open, Croatia	Clay	(North Macedonia) Lina Gjorcheska	(Chinese Taipei) Chuang Chia-jung (Czech Republic) Renata Voráčová	4–6, 2–6

=== ITF Circuit finals ===
==== Singles: 20 (10 titles, 10 runner-ups) ====
Legend $60,000 tournaments $25,000 tournaments $15,000 tournaments $10,000 tournaments	Finals by surface Hard (4–5) Clay (6–5)

Result	W–L	Date	Tournament	Tier	Surface	Opponent	Score
Win	1–0	Sep 2008	ITF Bogotá, Colombia	10,000	Clay (i)	(Colombia) Viky Núñez Fuentes	6–4, 7–6^{(2)}
Loss	1–1	Jun 2009	ITF Melilla, Spain	10,000	Hard	(Italy) Giulia Gasparri	5–7, 4–6
Win	2–1	Jan 2011	ITF Bucaramanga, Colombia	10,000	Clay	(Colombia) Yuliana Lizarazo	6–1, 6–2
Win	3–1	Mar 2011	ITF Concepción, Chile	10,000	Clay	(Argentina) Andrea Benítez	1–6, 6–4, 6–4
Win	4–1	Mar 2011	ITF Rancagua, Chile	10,000	Clay	(Argentina) Catalina Pella	3–6, 6–2, 6–2
Loss	4–2	Jun 2011	ITF Izmir, Turkey	10,000	Clay	(Ukraine) Elizaveta Ianchuk	5–7, 1–6
Loss	4–3	Jul 2011	ITF Izmir, Turkey	10,000	Clay	(Italy) Agnese Zucchini	5–7, 3–6
Win	5–3	Jul 2011	ITF Izmir, Turkey	10,000	Clay	(Russia) Daria Mishina	6–4, 6–3
Loss	5–4	Jul 2011	ITF Izmir, Turkey	10,000	Clay	(Romania) Ana Bogdan	1–6, 2–6
Loss	5–5	Apr 2012	ITF Manama, Bahrain	10,000	Hard	(France) Lou Brouleau	5–7, 1–6
Win	6–5	Sep 2012	ITF Madrid, Spain	10,000	Clay	(France) Jade Suvrijn	6–0, 6–4
Loss	6–6	Jan 2013	ITF Sharm El Sheikh, Egypt	10,000	Hard	(Egypt) Mayar Sherif	2–6, 6–2, 1–6
Win	7–6	Jan 2015	ITF Sharm El Sheikh, Egypt	10,000	Hard	(Austria) Pia König	6–3, 6–4
Loss	7–7	Apr 2015	ITF León, Mexico	15,000	Hard	(United States) Danielle Lao	6–3, 3–6, 5–7
Loss	7–8	Jul 2016	ITF Campos do Jordão, Brazil	25,000	Hard	(Chile) Daniela Seguel	5–7, 6–4, 5–7
Loss	7–9	Sep 2018	ITF Marbella, Spain	15,000	Clay	(Romania) Gabriela Talabă	2–6, 2–6
Win	8–9	Sep 2018	ITF Ceuta, Spain	15,000	Hard	(Spain) Lucía Cortez Llorca	6–1, 4–6, 6–1
Win	9–9	Jul 2019	ITF Qujing, China	25,000	Hard (i)	(China) Yang Yidi	7–5, 6–3
Win	10–9	Aug 2019	ITF Guiyang, China	25,000	Hard	(South Korea) Jang Su-jeong	6–4, 6–2
Loss	10–10	Sep 2019	Changsha Open, China	60,000	Clay	(Serbia) Nina Stojanović	1–6, 1–6

==== Doubles: 31 (14 titles, 17 runner-ups) ====
Legend $50/60,000 tournaments $25,000 tournaments $15,000 tournaments $10,000 tournaments	Finals by surface Hard (5–6) Clay (8–10) Grass (0–1) Carpet (1–0)

Result	W–L	Date	Tournament	Tier	Surface	Partner	Opponents	Score
Loss	0–1	May 2008	ITF Buenos Aires, Argentina	10,000	Clay	(Brazil) Nathália Rossi	(Argentina) Carla Beltrami (Argentina) Guillermina Zukerman	5–7, 2–6
Loss	0–2	Sep 2008	ITF Bogotá, Colombia	10,000	Clay (i)	(Colombia) Yuliana Lizarazo	(Colombia) Viky Núñez Fuentes (Colombia) Paula Robles-García	3–6, 4–6
Loss	0–3	Dec 2008	ITF Fortaleza, Brazil	10,000	Hard	(Brazil) Nathália Rossi	(Brazil) Natalia Guitler (Brazil) Carla Tiene	6–7^{(5)}, 1–6
Loss	0–4	Jun 2011	ITF Izmir, Turkey	10,000	Clay	(Slovakia) Anna Karolína Schmiedlová	(Russia) Tatiana Kotelnikova (Russia) Eugeniya Pashkova	4–6, 0–6
Loss	0–5	Oct 2011	Lagos Open, Nigeria	25,000	Hard	(Slovenia) Tadeja Majerič	(Russia) Nina Bratchikova (Austria) Melanie Klaffner	5–7, 7–5, [6–10]
Loss	0–6	Nov 2011	ITF Benicarló, Spain	25,000	Clay	(Russia) Ekaterina Ivanova	(Spain) Inés Ferrer Suárez (Netherlands) Richèl Hogenkamp	6–7^{(6)}, 4–6
Loss	0–7	May 2012	ITF Brasília, Brazil	25,000	Clay	(France) Alizé Lim	(Venezuela) Gabriela Paz (Bolivia) María Álvarez Terán	2–6, 4–6
Loss	0–8	Sep 2012	ITF Mont-de-Marsan, France	25,000	Clay	(Brazil) Teliana Pereira	(Switzerland) Timea Bacsinszky (Romania) Mihaela Buzărnescu	4–6, 1–6
Loss	0–9	Sep 2012	Open de Saint-Malo, France	25,000	Clay	(Brazil) Teliana Pereira	(Turkey) Pemra Özgen (Ukraine) Alyona Sotnikova	4–6, 6–7^{(6)}
Win	1–9	Sep 2012	ITF Madrid, Spain	10,000	Clay	(Denmark) Malou Ejdesgaard	(Argentina) Tatiana Búa (Spain) Yvonne Cavallé Reimers	5–7, 6–3, [10–3]
Loss	1–10	Oct 2012	ITF Seville, Spain	25,000	Clay	(Brazil) Teliana Pereira	(Poland) Paula Kania-Choduń (Poland) Katarzyna Piter	7–5, 4–6, [6–10]
Loss	1–11	Feb 2013	ITF Sharm El Sheikh, Egypt	10,000	Hard	(Russia) Ekaterina Yashina	(Poland) Katarzyna Kawa (Poland) Natalia Kołat	1–6, 4–6
Loss	1–12	Apr 2013	ITF Istanbul, Turkey	50,000	Hard	(Turkey) Başak Eraydın	(Russia) Ekaterina Bychkova (Ukraine) Nadiia Kichenok	6–3, 2–6, [5–10]
Win	2–12	Mar 2014	ITF Port Pirie, Australia	15,000	Hard	(Australia) Jessica Moore	(Japan) Miyabi Inoue (Japan) Hiroko Kuwata	6–4, 6–3
Loss	2–13	Mar 2014	ITF Mildura, Australia	15,000	Grass	(Australia) Jessica Moore	(South Korea) Jang Su-jeong (South Korea) Lee So-ra	1–6, 6–1, [4–10]
Win	3–13	Apr 2014	ITF Glen Iris, Australia	15,000	Clay	(Australia) Jessica Moore	(Australia) Tammi Patterson (Australia) Ellen Perez	6–4, 6–2
Win	4–13	Apr 2014	ITF Melbourne, Australia	15,000	Clay	(Australia) Jessica Moore	(Japan) Miyu Kato (Japan) Yuuki Tanaka	7–5, 6–7^{(5)}, [10–7]
Loss	4–14	Sep 2014	Batumi Ladies Open, Georgia	25,000	Hard	(Ukraine) Valeriya Strakhova	(Belgium) An-Sophie Mestach (Poland) Sandra Zaniewska	1–6, 1–6
Loss	4–15	Aug 2015	ITF Wanfercee-Baulet, Belgium	15,000	Clay	(Belgium) Elyne Boeykens	(Netherlands) Quirine Lemoine (Netherlands) Eva Wacanno	6–2, 2–6, [6–10]
Win	5–15	Oct 2015	ITF Bucaramanga, Colombia	25,000	Clay	(Chile) Daniela Seguel	(Paraguay) Montserrat González (Dominican Republic) Francesca Segarelli	6–2, 7–6^{(3)}
Win	6–15	Feb 2016	ITF Cuernavaca, Mexico	25,000	Hard	(Hungary) Fanny Stollár	(Ukraine) Elizaveta Ianchuk (Czech Republic) Kateřina Kramperová	6–3, 6–2
Win	7–15	May 2016	Fukuoka International, Japan	50,000	Carpet	(Netherlands) Indy de Vroome	(Uzbekistan) Nigina Abduraimova (Russia) Ksenia Lykina	6–4, 6–1
Win	8–15	Jun 2016	ITF Lenzerheide, Switzerland	25,000	Clay	(Slovenia) Tadeja Majerič	(Romania) Irina Bara (Belgium) Elyne Boeykens	7–5, 1–6, [10–8]
Win	9–15	Nov 2016	ITF Chenzhou, China	25,000	Hard	(United States) Jacqueline Cako	(Russia) Angelina Gabueva (Georgia (country)) Sofia Shapatava	3–6, 6–4, [10–6]
Win	10–15	Nov 2016	Pune Open, India	25,000	Hard	(Russia) Irina Khromacheva	(India) Sowjanya Bavisetti (India) Rishika Sunkara	6–2, 6–1
Win	11–15	Apr 2017	Chiasso Open, Switzerland	25,000	Clay	(North Macedonia) Lina Gjorcheska	(Czech Republic) Kateřina Kramperová (Netherlands) Rosalie van der Hoek	7–5, 2–6, [10–7]
Loss	11–16	May 2017	ITF Lleida, Spain	25,000	Clay	(Belarus) Vera Lapko	(Venezuela) Andrea Gámiz (Spain) Georgina García Pérez	1–6, 6–4, [8–10]
Win	12–16	Jul 2017	ITF Getxo, Spain	25,000	Clay	(Venezuela) Andrea Gámiz	(Spain) Cristina Bucșa (Bolivia) Noelia Zeballos	6–2, 6–4
Win	13–16	May 2018	ITF Baotou, China	60,000	Clay (i)	(Australia) Alison Bai	(Serbia) Natalija Kostić (Russia) Nika Kukharchuk	6–4, 0–6, [10–6]
Loss	13–17	Dec 2018	Pune Open, India	25,000	Hard	(Slovenia) Tamara Zidanšek	(India) Ankita Raina (India) Karman Thandi	2–6, 7–6^{(5)}, [9–11]
Win	14–17	May 2019	ITF Nonthaburi, Thailand	25,000	Hard	(Turkey) İpek Soylu	(Japan) Haruka Kaji (Japan) Risa Ozaki	6–1, 6–3
