= Ksenia Lykina =

Russian tennis player

Ksenia Lykina Ксения Лыкина
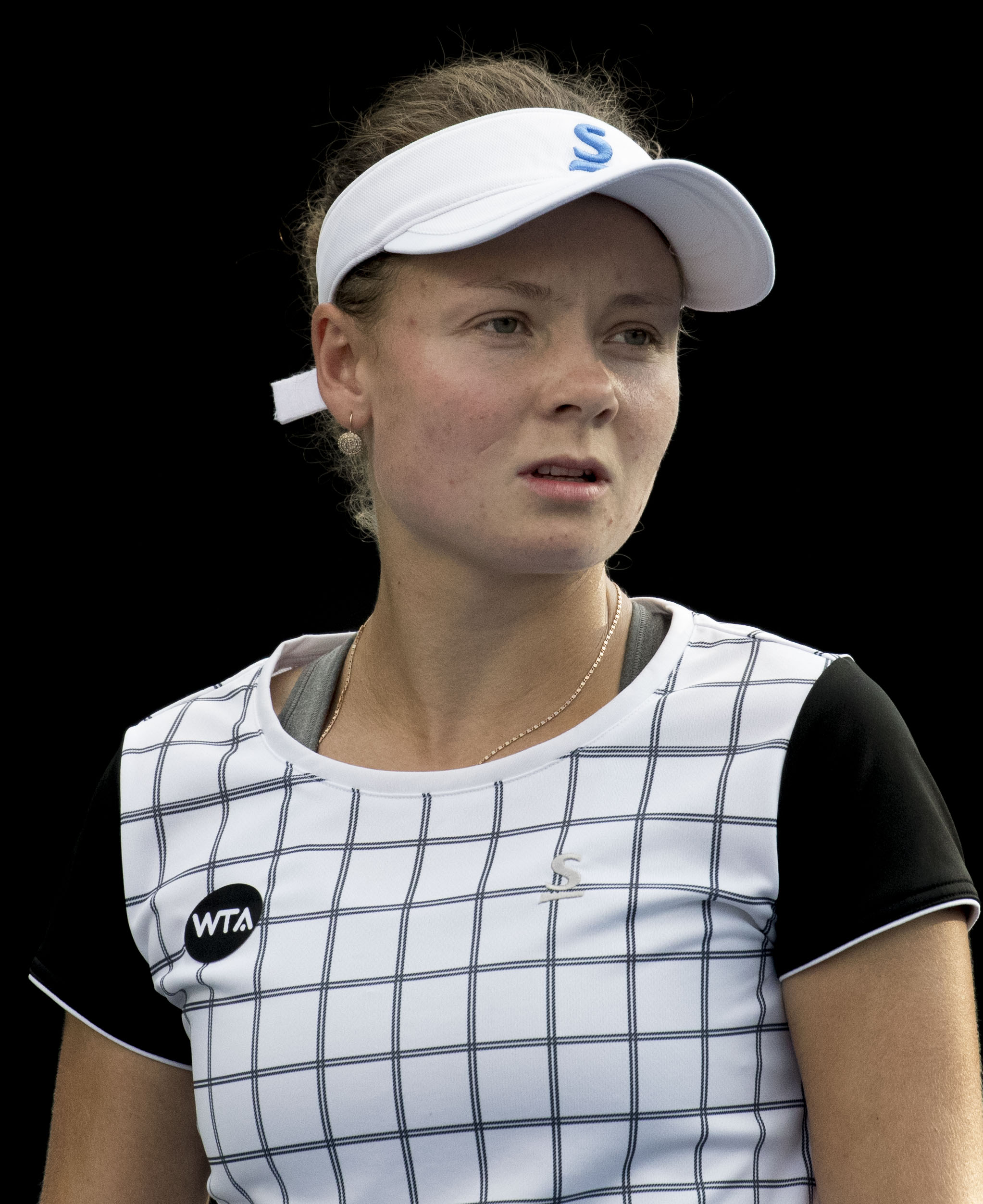
- Country (sports): Russia
- Residence: Prague, Czech Republic; Kazan, Russia
- Born: 19 June 1990 (age 36) Moscow, Soviet Union
- Height: 1.65 m (5 ft 5 in)
- Plays: Right (two-handed backhand)
- Prize money: US$ 260,749

Singles
- Career record: 264–225
- Career titles: 6 ITF
- Highest ranking: No. 171 (19 April 2010)

Doubles
- Career record: 221–163
- Career titles: 15 ITF
- Highest ranking: No. 108 (6 February 2017)

Ksenia Valentinovna Lykina (Russian: Ксения Валентиновна Лыкина; born 19 June 1990) is a Russian former tennis player. Her highest WTA singles ranking is No. 171, which she reached in April 2010. Her career-high in doubles is 108, which she achieved in February 2017. She is an Australian Open girls' doubles champion (2008), and a finalist of US Open girls' doubles (2007).

Her best ITF junior ranking was No. 4 in the world.

Her best performance as professional player at a major came at the 2009 US Open, when she reached round three of qualifying.

== ITF Circuit finals ==
=== Singles: 13 (6 titles, 7 runner-ups) ===
Legend $75,000 tournaments $50/60,000 tournaments $25,000 tournaments $10,000 tournaments	Finals by surface Hard (2–4) Grass (2–0) Carpet (2–3)

Result	W–L	Date	Tournament	Tier	Surface	Opponent	Score
Win	1–0	Sep 2008	ITF Clermont-Ferrand, France	10,000	Hard (i)	(France) Samantha Schoeffel	6–4, 6–4
Loss	1–1	Nov 2008	Toyota World Challenge, Japan	75,000	Carpet (i)	(Japan) Ayumi Morita	1–6, 3–6
Win	2–1	May 2009	Kurume Cup, Japan	50,000	Grass	(Russia) Elena Chalova	7–5, 6–3
Loss	2–2	Dec 2009	ITF Přerov, Czech Republic	25,000	Hard (i)	(France) Claire Feuerstein	7–6^{(5)}, 3–6, 4–6
Loss	2–3	Apr 2011	ITF Antalya, Turkey	10,000	Hard	(Russia) Daria Gavrilova	4–6, 6–4, 2–6
Win	3–3	Feb 2013	ITF Mildura, Australia	25,000	Grass	(Australia) Azra Hadzic	7–6^{(3)}, 6–3
Loss	3–4	Apr 2015	ITF Qarshi, Uzbekistan	25,000	Hard	(Uzbekistan) Sabina Sharipova	2–6, 3–6
Win	4–4	May 2016	Fukuoka International, Japan	50,000	Carpet	(Japan) Kyōka Okamura	6–2, 6–7^{(2)}, 6–0
Loss	4–5	Jun 2016	ITF Namangan, Uzbekistan	25,000	Hard	(Czech Republic) Barbora Štefková	5–7, 5–7
Win	5–5	Oct 2016	ITF Makinohara, Japan	25,000	Carpet	(Japan) Riko Sawayanagi	6–3, 6–3
Loss	5–6	Oct 2016	ITF Hamamatsu, Japan	25,000	Carpet	(Japan) Shuko Aoyama	4–6, 4–6
Win	6–6	Jun 2017	ITF Andijan, Uzbekistan	25,000	Hard	(Russia) Anastasia Frolova	6–4, 3–6, 6–4
Loss	6–7	May 2018	Fukuoka International, Japan	60,000	Carpet	(United Kingdom) Katie Boulter	7–5, 4–6, 2–6

=== Doubles: 39 (15 titles, 24 runner-ups) ===
Legend $80,000 tournaments $50/60,000 tournaments $25,000 tournaments $10/15,000 tournaments	Finals by surface Hard (7–18) Clay (3–4) Grass (3–1) Carpet (2–1)

Result	No.	Date	Tournament	Tier	Surface	Partner	Opponents	Score
Loss	1.	May 2006	ITF Doksy, Czech Republic	10,000	Clay	(Czech Republic) Hana Birnerová	(Czech Republic) Iveta Gerlová (Czech Republic) Lucie Kriegsmannová	7–6, 2–6, 2–6
Loss	2.	Feb 2007	ITF Tipton, United Kingdom	25,000	Hard (i)	(Poland) Urszula Radwańska	(Netherlands) Kim Kilsdonk (Netherlands) Elise Tamaëla	3–6, 3–6
Win	1.	Sep 2008	ITF Clermont-Ferrand, France	10,000	Hard (i)	(Italy) Vivienne Vierin	(France) Samantha Schoeffel (Netherlands) Bibiane Schoofs	6–3, 6–2
Loss	3.	Dec 2008	ITF Přerov, Czech Republic	25,000	Hard (i)	(Czech Republic) Kateřina Vaňková	(Czech Republic) Tereza Hladíková (Czech Republic) Renata Voráčová	0–6, 6–3, [3–10]
Win	2.	Jun 2009	ITF Périgueux, France	25,000	Clay	(Ukraine) Yuliya Beygelzimer	(Argentina) Jorgelina Cravero (Argentina) María Irigoyen	2–6, 6–2, [10–5]
Win	3.	Sep 2009	ITF Denain, France	50,000	Clay	(Russia) Elena Chalova	(Poland) Magdalena Kiszczyńska (Serbia) Teodora Mirčić	6–4, 6–3
Win	4.	Mar 2010	ITF Namangan, Uzbekistan	25,000	Hard	(Ukraine) Kristina Antoniychuk	(Poland) Karolina Kosińska (Slovakia) Lenka Wienerová	6–3, 5–7, [10–8]
Loss	4.	May 2010	Kangaroo Cup, Japan	50,000	Hard	(United Kingdom) Melanie South	(Japan) Erika Sema (Japan) Tomoko Yonemura	3–6, 6–2, [7–10]
Win	5.	May 2010	ITF Prague Open, Czech Republic	50,000	Clay	(Slovenia) Maša Zec Peškirič	(Czech Republic) Petra Cetkovská (Czech Republic) Eva Hrdinová	6–3, 6–4
Loss	5.	Sep 2010	ITF Alphen aan den Rijn, Netherlands	25,000	Clay	(France) Irena Pavlovic	(Netherlands) Daniëlle Harmsen (Netherlands) Bibiane Schoofs	3–6, 2–6
Loss	6.	Feb 2011	ITF Stockholm, Sweden	25,000	Hard (i)	(France) Claire Feuerstein	(Netherlands) Arantxa Rus (Belarus) Anastasiya Yakimova	3–6, 6–2, [8–10]
Loss	7.	Jun 2011	ITF Kristinehamn, Sweden	25,000	Clay	(Hungary) Tímea Babos	(Bosnia and Herzegovina) Mervana Jugić-Salkić (Finland) Emma Laine	4–6, 4–6
Loss	8.	Sep 2011	ITF Clermont-Ferrand, France	25,000	Hard (i)	(Russia) Ekaterina Lopes	(Bosnia and Herzegovina) Mervana Jugić-Salkić (United Kingdom) Anne Keothavong	6–4, 3–6, [8–10]
Win	6.	Jan 2012	ITF Stuttgart, Germany	10,000	Hard (i)	(Poland) Paula Kania	(Ukraine) Lyudmyla Kichenok (Ukraine) Nadiia Kichenok	6–4, 6–3
Win	7.	Feb 2012	ITF Mildura, Australia	25,000	Grass	(Bosnia and Herzegovina) Mervana Jugić-Salkić	(Australia) Stephanie Bengson (Australia) Tyra Calderwood	5–7, 7–5, [10–7]
Loss	9.	May 2012	Kurume Cup, Japan	50,000	Grass	(United Kingdom) Melanie South	(China) Han Xinyun (China) Sun Shengnan	1–6, 0–6
Loss	10.	Jun 2012	ITF Lenzerheide, Switzerland	25,000	Clay	(Bulgaria) Isabella Shinikova	(Serbia) Aleksandra Krunić (Croatia) Ana Vrljić	2–6, 4–6
Win	8.	Feb 2013	Launceston International, Australia	25,000	Hard	(United Kingdom) Emily Webley-Smith	(United States) Allie Kiick (Canada) Erin Routliffe	7–5, 6–3
Win	9.	Feb 2013	ITF Mildura, Australia	25,000	Grass	(Japan) Yurika Sema	(Australia) Bojana Bobusic (United Kingdom) Emily Webley-Smith	6–4, 6–2
Win	10.	Feb 2015	ITF Port El Kantaoui, Tunisia	10,000	Hard	(United Kingdom) Francesca Stephenson	(Slovakia) Vivien Juhászová (Czech Republic) Tereza Malíková	6–2, 6–2
Loss	11.	Apr 2015	ITF Qarshi, Uzbekistan	25,000	Hard	(Kazakhstan) Kamila Kerimbayeva	(Russia) Valentyna Ivakhnenko (Russia) Polina Monova	1–6, 3–6
Loss	12.	Jun 2015	ITF Andijan, Uzbekistan	25,000	Hard	(Russia) Veronika Kudermetova	(Uzbekistan) Nigina Abduraimova (Japan) Hiroko Kuwata	6–4, 6–7^{(5)}, [9–11]
Loss	13.	Jun 2015	ITF Namangan, Uzbekistan	25,000	Hard	(Russia) Veronika Kudermetova	(Russia) Anastasiya Komardina (Bulgaria) Julia Terziyska	6–7^{(2)}, 5–7
Loss	14.	Mar 2016	ITF Puebla, México	25,000	Hard	(Russia) Irina Khromacheva	(Japan) Akiko Omae (India) Prarthana Thombare	4–6, 6–2, [8–10]
Loss	15.	Apr 2016	ITF Qarshi, Uzbekistan	25,000	Hard	(Russia) Polina Monova	(Russia) Natela Dzalamidze (Russia) Veronika Kudermetova	6–4, 4–6, [7–10]
Loss	16.	Apr 2016	ITF Nanning, China	25,000	Hard	(United Kingdom) Emily Webley-Smith	(China) Liu Chang (Thailand) Varatchaya Wongteanchai	1–6, 4–6
Loss	17.	May 2016	Fukuoka International, Japan	50,000	Carpet	(Uzbekistan) Nigina Abduraimova	(Bulgaria) Alexandrina Naydenova (Netherlands) Indy de Vroome	4–6, 1–6
Win	11.	May 2016	Kurume Cup, Japan	50,000	Grass	(Chinese Taipei) Hsu Ching-wen	(Hungary) Dalma Gálfi (China) Xu Shilin	7–6^{(5)}, 6–2
Win	12.	Jun 2016	ITF Namangan, Uzbekistan	25,000	Hard	(Russia) Polina Monova	(Russia) Veronika Kudermetova (Slovakia) Tereza Mihalíková	3–6, 6–3, [10–5]
Win	13.	Oct 2016	ITF Makinohara, Japan	25,000	Carpet	(Japan) Riko Sawayanagi	(Japan) Rika Fujiwara (Japan) Erika Sema	6–4, 6–1
Win	14.	Nov 2016	Toyota World Challenge, Japan	50,000	Carpet (i)	(Japan) Akiko Omae	(Japan) Rika Fujiwara (Japan) Ayaka Okuno	6–7^{(4)}, 6–2, [10–5]
Loss	18.	Jan 2017	ITF Hong Kong	25,000	Hard	(Japan) Riko Sawayanagi	(Japan) Hiroko Kuwata (Japan) Akiko Omae	1–6, 0–6
Loss	19.	Apr 2017	ITF İstanbul, Turkey	60,000	Hard	(Russia) Polina Monova	(Russia) Veronika Kudermetova (Turkey) İpek Soylu	6–4, 5–7, [9–11]
Loss	20.	Jun 2017	ITF Namangan, Uzbekistan	25,000	Hard	(Uzbekistan) Nigina Abduraimova	(Russia) Olga Doroshina (Russia) Polina Monova	2–6, 6–7^{(8)}
Loss	21.	Jun 2017	Fergana Challenger, Uzbekistan	25,000	Hard	(Uzbekistan) Sabina Sharipova	(Uzbekistan) Nigina Abduraimova (Russia) Anastasia Frolova	6–7^{(7)}, 5–7
Loss	22.	Aug 2017	ITF Landisville, United States	25,000	Hard	(United Kingdom) Emily Webley-Smith	(United States) Sophie Chang (United States) Alexandra Mueller	6–4, 3–6 [5–10]
Win	15.	Nov 2017	Toyota World Challenge, Japan	60,000	Carpet (i)	(Japan) Junri Namigata	(Thailand) Nicha Lertpitaksinchai (Thailand) Peangtarn Plipuech	3–6, 6–3, [10–4]
Loss	23.	Mar 2018	ITF Kazan, Russia	15,000	Hard (i)	(Russia) Anastasia Frolova	(Russia) Alena Fomina (Russia) Elena Rybakina	4–6, 6–1, [6–10]
Loss	24.	May 2018	Kangaroo Cup, Japan	80,000	Hard	(United Kingdom) Emily Webley-Smith	(Japan) Rika Fujiwara (Japan) Yuki Naito	5–7, 4–6
