= Nigina Abduraimova =

Uzbekistani tennis player (born 1994)

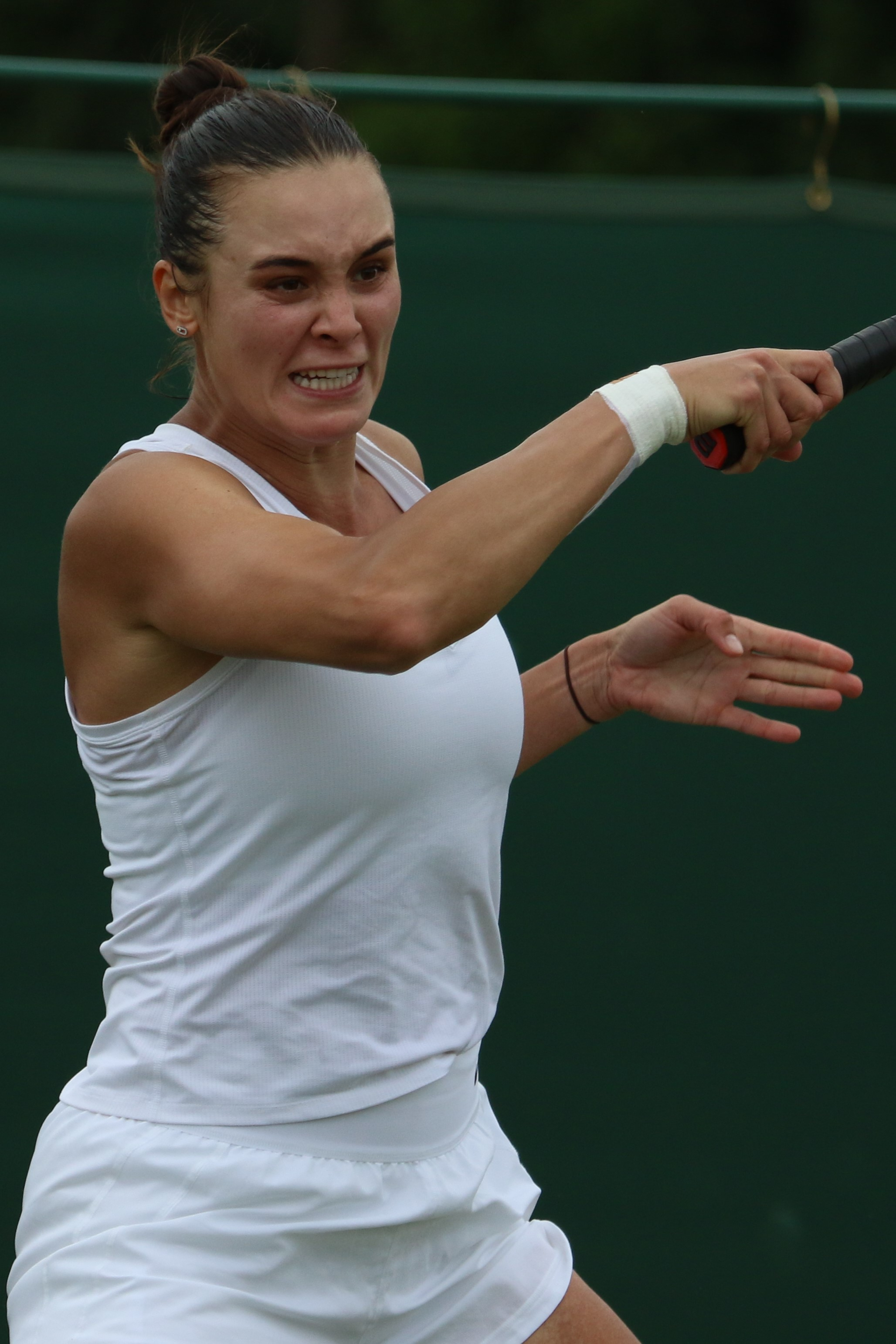
- Abduraimova at the 2023 Wimbledon Championships
- Country (sports): Uzbekistan
- Born: 7 July 1994 (age 32) Tashkent, Uzbekistan
- Height: 1.82 m (6 ft 0 in)
- Turned pro: 2009
- Retired: (last match played August 2025)
- Plays: Right (two-handed backhand)
- Prize money: $611,620

Singles
- Career record: 366–267
- Career titles: 13 ITF
- Highest ranking: No. 144 (29 September 2014)

Grand Slam singles results
- Australian Open: Q2 (2023, 2024)
- French Open: Q1 (2015, 2023, 2024)
- Wimbledon: Q2 (2017, 2022)
- US Open: Q3 (2013)

Doubles
- Career record: 191–161
- Career titles: 17 ITF
- Highest ranking: No. 175 (25 September 2017)

Team competitions
- BJK Cup: 25–30

Nigina Abduraimova (Uzbek: Нигина Абдураимова; born 7 July 1994) is an inactive Uzbeki tennis player.

On 29 September 2014, she reached a career-high WTA singles ranking of No. 144, and on 25 September 2017, she reached world No. 175 in doubles. Abduraimova has won 13 singles and 17 doubles titles on the ITF Women's Circuit.

Playing for the Uzbekistan Billie Jean King Cup team, Abduraimova has a win–loss record of 25–30 (as of July 2024).

== Career ==
In July 2016, she won the title at the $25k tournament in Qujing, defeating Liu Fangzhou in the final.

In October 2022, she reached the final of the $25k Loughborough event, which she lost to Emily Appleton. A month later, she reached the final of the $25k Slovak Open in Bratislava but lost to Ana Konjuh.

In January 2023, she reached the final of the $40k Pune Championships, losing to Tatjana Maria.

== Grand Slam singles performance timeline ==
Key
| W | F | SF | QF | #R | RR | Q# | DNQ | A | NH |

(W) winner; (F) finalist; (SF) semifinalist; (QF) quarterfinalist; (#R) rounds 4, 3, 2, 1; (RR) round-robin stage; (Q#) qualification round; (DNQ) did not qualify; (A) absent; (NH) not held; (SR) strike rate (events won / competed); (W–L) win–loss record.
To avoid confusion and double counting, these charts are updated at the conclusion of a tournament or when the player's participation has ended.

| Tournament | 2013 | 2014 | 2015 | 2016 | 2017 | ... | 2022 | 2023 | 2024 | W–L |
|---|---|---|---|---|---|---|---|---|---|---|
| Australian Open | A | Q1 | Q1 | A | Q1 | | A | Q2 | Q2 | 0–0 |
| French Open | A | A | Q1 | A | A | | A | Q1 | Q1 | 0–0 |
| Wimbledon | A | A | Q1 | A | Q2 | | Q2 | Q1 | A | 0–0 |
| US Open | Q3 | Q2 | Q2 | Q1 | A | | Q1 | Q1 | A | 0–0 |
| Win–loss | 0–0 | 0–0 | 0–0 | 0–0 | 0–0 | | 0–0 | 0–0 | 0–0 | 0–0 |

== ITF Circuit finals ==
=== Singles: 24 (13 titles, 11 runner-ups) ===
| Legend $50/60,000 tournaments (1–2) $40,000 tournaments (0–1) $25,000 tournaments (10–5) $10/15,000 tournaments (2–3) | Finals by surface Hard (10–10) Clay (2–0) Grass (1–1) |

| Result | W–L | Date | Tournament | Tier | Surface | Opponent | Score |
|---|---|---|---|---|---|---|---|
| Loss | 0–1 | Sep 2012 | ITF Gaziantep, Turkey | 10,000 | Hard | (Russia) Margarita Lazareva | 1–6, 5–7 |
| Loss | 1–1 | Jun 2013 | ITF Bukhara, Uzbekistan | 25,000 | Hard | (Japan) Miharu Imanishi | 5–7, 5–7 |
| Win | 1–2 | Sep 2013 | Fergana Challenger, Uzbekistan | 25,000 | Hard | (Ukraine) Anastasiya Vasylyeva | 2–6, 6–1, 7–6^{(5)} |
| Loss | 1–3 | Apr 2014 | ITF Qarshi, Uzbekistan | 25,000 | Hard | (Czech Republic) Tereza Smitková | 3–6, 6–4, 6–7 |
| Loss | 1–4 | Apr 2014 | ITF Namangan, Uzbekistan | 25,000 | Hard | (United Kingdom) Naomi Broady | 3–6, 4–6 |
| Win | 2–4 | Jun 2014 | Fergana Challenger, Uzbekistan | 25,000 | Hard | (Japan) Nao Hibino | 6–3, 6–4 |
| Win | 3–4 | Jun 2015 | ITF Namangan, Uzbekistan | 25,000 | Hard | (Russia) Anastasiya Komardina | 7–6^{(3)}, 6–2 |
| Loss | 3–5 | Jul 2015 | ITF Bangkok, Thailand | 25,000 | Hard | (Japan) Miyu Kato | 5–7, 2–6 |
| Loss | 3–6 | May 2016 | Kurume Cup, Japan | 50,000 | Grass | (Japan) Kyōka Okamura | 6–7^{(10)}, 6–1, 5–7 |
| Win | 4–6 | May 2016 | ITF Karuizawa, Japan | 25,000 | Grass | (Belgium) An-Sophie Mestach | 6–3, 7–5 |
| Win | 5–6 | Jul 2016 | ITF Qujing, China | 25,000 | Hard | (China) Liu Fangzhou | 7–5, 6–3 |
| Win | 6–6 | Sep 2017 | Batumi Ladies Open, Georgia | 25,000 | Hard | (Russia) Anna Kalinskaya | 3–6, 6–4, 6–3 |
| Win | 7–6 | Jun 2018 | Fergana Challenger, Uzbekistan | 25,000 | Hard | (Russia) Anastasia Frolova | 6–3, 2–0 ret. |
| Loss | 7–7 | Dec 2019 | ITF Nonthaburi, Thailand | W15 | Hard | (Japan) Himeno Sakatsume | 6–7^{(3)}, 7–5, 1–6 |
| Win | 8–7 | Dec 2019 | ITF Nonthaburi, Thailand | W15 | Hard | (Chinese Taipei) Lee Pei-chi | 6–1, 1–6, 6–3 |
| Win | 9–7 | Jul 2021 | ITF Moscow, Russia | W15 | Clay | (Russia) Maria Shusharina | 6–1, 6–1 |
| Win | 10–7 | Oct 2021 | ITF Karaganda, Kazakhstan | W25 | Hard (i) | (Slovakia) Viktoria Morvayova | 6–7^{(3)}, 6–3, 6–1 |
| Loss | 10–8 | Nov 2021 | ITF Kazan, Russia | W15 | Hard (i) | (Russia) Polina Kudermetova | 5–7, 6–3, 4–6 |
| Win | 11–8 | Jan 2022 | ITF Monastir, Tunisia | W25 | Hard | (South Korea) Han Na-lae | 6–3, 4–6, 7–6^{(7)} |
| Win | 12–8 | Apr 2022 | ITF Monastir, Tunisia | W25 | Hard | (Spain) Yvonne Cavallé Reimers | 3–6, 6–2, 6–2 |
| Loss | 12–9 | Oct 2022 | GB Pro-Series Loughborough, United Kingdom | W25 | Hard (i) | (United Kingdom) Emily Appleton | 4–6, 4–6 |
| Loss | 12–10 | Nov 2022 | Bratislava Open, Slovakia | W60 | Hard (i) | (Croatia) Ana Konjuh | 6–2, 0–6, 6–7^{(2)} |
| Loss | 12–11 | Jan 2023 | Pune Championships, India | W40 | Hard | (Germany) Tatjana Maria | 1–6, 1–6 |
| Win | 13–11 | Apr 2023 | Oeiras CETO Open, Portugal | W60 | Clay | (Portugal) Francisca Jorge | 1–6, 6–4, 6–3 |

=== Doubles: 29 (17 titles, 12 runner-ups) ===
| Legend $100,000 tournaments (0–1) $50,000 tournaments (2–1) W40/50 tournaments (0–1) W25/35 tournaments (10–7) W10/15 tournaments (4–1) | Finals by surface Hard (17–7) Clay (0–4) Grass (0–1) |

| Result | W–L | Date | Tournament | Tier | Surface | Partner | Opponents | Score |
|---|---|---|---|---|---|---|---|---|
| Win | 1–0 | Jul 2009 | ITF Gaziantep, Turkey | 10,000 | Hard | (Australia) Jade Hopper | (Latvia) Diāna Marcinkēviča (Ukraine) Yuliana Umanets | 6–3, 6–7^{(6)}, [13–11] |
| Win | 2–0 | Nov 2010 | ITF Antalya, Turkey | 10,000 | Hard | (Russia) Marta Sirotkina | (Russia) Julia Samuseva (Russia) Ekaterina Yakovleva | 3–6, 6–1, [10–7] |
| Win | 3–0 | Mar 2011 | ITF Namangan, Uzbekistan | 25,000 | Hard | (Uzbekistan) Albina Khabibulina | (Russia) Ekaterina Bychkova (Russia) Marina Shamayko | 4–6, 7–6^{(4)}, [10–8] |
| Win | 4–0 | Apr 2011 | ITF Qarshi, Uzbekistan | 10,000 | Hard | (Uzbekistan) Albina Khabibulina | (Ukraine) Anna Shkudun (Russia) Ekaterina Yashina | 6–1, 6–2 |
| Win | 5–0 | Jul 2011 | Fergana Challenger, Uzbekistan | 25,000 | Hard | (Uzbekistan) Albina Khabibulina | (United States) Elizaveta Anna Nemchinov (Turkmenistan) Anastasiya Prenko | 6–3, 6–3 |
| Loss | 5–1 | Sep 2012 | ITF Shymkent, Kazakhstan | 25,000 | Hard | (Kyrgyzstan) Ksenia Palkina | (Ukraine) Valentyna Ivakhnenko (Ukraine) Kateryna Kozlova | 2–6, 4–6 |
| Win | 6–1 | Oct 2012 | ITF Seoul, South Korea | 25,000 | Hard | (Hong Kong) Venise Chan | (South Korea) Kim Ji-young (South Korea) Yoo Mi | 6–4, 2–6, [12–10] |
| Loss | 6–2 | Nov 2012 | ITF Istanbul, Turkey | 25,000 | Hard (i) | (Kyrgyzstan) Ksenia Palkina | (Turkey) Çağla Büyükakçay (Turkey) Pemra Özgen | 2–6, 1–6 |
| Win | 7–2 | Nov 2013 | Kemer Cup Istanbul, Turkey | 50,000 | Hard (i) | (Italy) Maria Elena Camerin | (Slovenia) Tadeja Majerič (Romania) Andreea Mitu | 6–3, 2–6, [10–8] |
| Loss | 7–3 | Jun 2014 | ITF Bukhara, Uzbekistan | 25,000 | Clay | (Uzbekistan) Akgul Amanmuradova | (Ukraine) Veronika Kapshay (Uzbekistan) Sabina Sharipova | 4–6, 4–6 |
| Win | 8–3 | Jun 2015 | ITF Andijan, Uzbekistan | 25,000 | Hard | (Japan) Hiroko Kuwata | (Russia) Veronika Kudermetova (Russia) Ksenia Lykina | 4–6, 7–6^{(5)}, [11–9] |
| Win | 9–3 | Apr 2016 | Lale Cup Istanbul, Turkey | 50,000 | Hard | (Czech Republic) Barbora Štefková | (Russia) Valentyna Ivakhnenko (Belarus) Lidziya Marozava | 6–4, 1–6, [10–6] |
| Loss | 9–4 | May 2016 | Fukuoka International, Japan | 50,000 | Grass | (Russia) Ksenia Lykina | (Bulgaria) Alexandrina Naydenova (Netherlands) Indy de Vroome | 4–6, 1–6 |
| Loss | 9–5 | Apr 2017 | ITF Qarshi, Uzbekistan | 25,000 | Hard | (Montenegro) Ana Veselinović | (Russia) Olga Doroshina (Russia) Polina Monova | 5–7, 2–6 |
| Loss | 9–6 | Jun 2017 | ITF Namangan, Uzbekistan | 25,000 | Hard | (Russia) Ksenia Lykina | (Russia) Olga Doroshina (Russia) Polina Monova | 2–6, 6–7^{(8)} |
| Win | 10–6 | Jun 2017 | Fergana Challenger, Uzbekistan | 25,000 | Hard | (Russia) Anastasia Frolova | (Russia) Ksenia Lykina (Uzbekistan) Sabina Sharipova | 7–6^{(7)}, 7–5 |
| Loss | 10–7 | Sep 2017 | ITF Almaty, Kazakhstan | 25,000 | Clay | (Uzbekistan) Akgul Amanmuradova | (Brazil) Gabriela Cé (Russia) Yana Sizikova | 4–6, 6–3, [7–10] |
| Win | 11–7 | Apr 2018 | ITF Qarshi, Uzbekistan | 25,000 | Hard | (Russia) Anastasia Frolova | (Russia) Anastasia Gasanova (Russia) Ekaterina Yashina | 7–6^{(7)}, 6–1 |
| Win | 12–7 | Jun 2019 | Fergana Challenger, Uzbekistan | W25 | Hard | (Turkey) Berfu Cengiz | (Australia) Isabella Bozicevic (Russia) Ksenia Laskutova | 4–6, 6–1, [10–3] |
| Win | 13–7 | Jun 2021 | Tatarstan Open, Russia | W25 | Hard | (Russia) Angelina Gabueva | (Belarus) Iryna Shymanovich (Belarus) Shalimar Talbi | 6–2, 7–6^{(5)} |
| Loss | 13–8 | Jul 2021 | ITF Moscow, Russia | W15 | Clay | (Russia) Angelina Gabueva | (Russia) Daria Mishina (Russia) Anna Morgina | 5–7, 6–2, [9–11] |
| Win | 14–8 | Aug 2021 | ITF Almaty, Kazakhstan | W25 | Hard | (Russia) Daria Mishina | (Uzbekistan) Sabina Sharipova (Netherlands) Stéphanie Visscher | 4–6, 6–4, [10–3] |
| Win | 15–8 | Nov 2021 | ITF Kazan, Russia | W15 | Hard (i) | (Russia) Ekaterina Reyngold | (Russia) Ekaterina Maklakova (Russia) Aleksandra Pospelova | 6–2, 6–7^{(8)}, [12–10] |
| Win | 16–8 | Apr 2022 | ITF Monastir, Tunisia | W25 | Hard | (Japan) Hiroko Kuwata | (New Zealand) Paige Hourigan; Valeria Savinykh | 6–1, 3–6, [12–10] |
| Loss | 16–9 | May 2022 | ITF Monastir, Tunisia | W25 | Hard | Aleksandra Pospelova | (China) Liu Fangzhou (Japan) Erika Sema | 3–6, 2–6 |
| Loss | 16–10 | Mar 2023 | ITF Ricany, Czech Republic | W40 | Hard | Alena Fomina-Klotz | (Germany) Tayisiya Morderger (Germany) Yana Morderger | 1–6, 6–4, [6–10] |
| Loss | 16–11 | Nov 2023 | ITF Charleston Pro, United States | W100 | Clay | (France) Carole Monnet | (United States) Hailey Baptiste (United States) Whitney Osuigwe | 4–6, 6–3, [11–13] |
| Loss | 16–12 | Mar 2024 | ITF Murska Sobota, Slovenia | W50 | Hard | (Czech Republic) Jesika Malečková | (Portugal) Francisca Jorge (United States) Anna Rogers | 4–6, 7–5, [8–10] |
| Win | 17–12 | Aug 2024 | ITF Roehampton, United Kingdom | W35 | Hard | (Australia) Lizette Cabrera | (Japan) Akiko Omae (Japan) Eri Shimizu | 6–2, 6–2 |
