= 2018 Challenger Banque Nationale de Granby – Women's singles =

Women's singles
- 2018 Challenger Banque Nationale de Granby

Final
- Champion: (Israel) Julia Glushko
- Runner-up: (Australia) Arina Rodionova
- Score: 6–4, 6–3

Events
Singles	men	women
Doubles	men	women
← 2017 ·	Challenger de Granby	· 2019 →

Cristiana Ferrando was the defending champion, but lost in the first round to Maria Sanchez.

Julia Glushko won the title after defeating Arina Rodionova 6–4, 6–3 in the final.

== Seeds ==
1. (Australia) Arina Rodionova (final)
2. (Czech Republic) Marie Bouzková (second round)
3. (Canada) Bianca Andreescu (semifinals, withdrew)
4. (United States) Francesca Di Lorenzo (second round)
5. (Israel) Julia Glushko (champion)
6. (Australia) Ellen Perez (quarterfinals)
7. (United States) Maria Sanchez (second round)
8. (Canada) Katherine Sebov (semifinals)

== Draw ==
=== Key ===
- Q = Qualifier
- WC = Wild card
- LL = Lucky loser
- Alt = Alternate
- SE = Special exempt
- PR = Protected ranking
- ITF = ITF entry
- JE = Junior exempt
- w/o = Walkover
- r = Retired
- d = Defaulted
- SR = Special ranking

=== Finals ===
Semifinals
1	(Australia) Arina Rodionova	6	6
8	(Canada) Katherine Sebov	2	0
3	(Canada) Bianca Andreescu
5	(Israel) Julia Glushko	w/o

Final
1	(Australia) Arina Rodionova	4	3
5	(Israel) Julia Glushko	6	6

=== Top half ===
First round
1	(Australia) Ar Rodionova	6	7^{7}
(Japan) H Kaji	4	6^{4}
(Australia) A Sharma	7^{7}	6
(Japan) S Akita	6^{5}	1
(France) M Arcangioli	3	3
(Canada) R Marino	6	6
(Italy) C Ferrando	2	5
7	(United States) M Sanchez	6	7
4	(United States) F Di Lorenzo	6	0	6
Q	(United Kingdom) F Christie	4	6	3
(United States) UM Arconada	6	3	6
Q	(Japan) N Hanatani	3	6	1
WC	(Canada) I Boulais	1	2
(Australia) O Tjandramulia	6	6
WC	(Canada) T Lagarde	3	4
8	(Canada) K Sebov	6	6

Second round
1	(Australia) Ar Rodionova	6	6
(Australia) A Sharma	4	1
(Canada) R Marino	4	6	6
7	(United States) M Sanchez	6	4	1
4	(United States) F Di Lorenzo	2	2
(United States) UM Arconada	6	6
(Australia) O Tjandramulia	1	2
8	(Canada) K Sebov	6	6

Quarterfinals
1	(Australia) Ar Rodionova	6	6^{5}	7
(Canada) R Marino	4	7^{7}	5
(United States) UM Arconada	0	1
8	(Canada) K Sebov	6	6

Semifinals
1	(Australia) Ar Rodionova	6	6
8	(Canada) K Sebov	2	0

=== Bottom half ===
First round
6	(Australia) E Perez	6	6
WC	(Canada) J Bui	4	3
(United States) R Anderson	6	4	6
(Mexico) M Zacarías	4	6	2
(Chinese Taipei) C-y Hsu	6	4	6^{4}
WC	(Canada) LA Fernandez	3	6	7^{7}
(Italy) G Brescia	2	6^{7}
3	(Canada) B Andreescu	6	7^{9}
5	(Israel) J Glushko	7^{7}	4	6
Q	(United Kingdom) S Murray	6^{4}	6	4
(Slovenia) N Kolar	2	1
(Japan) E Sema	6	6
(United States) M Mateas	4	6	3
Q	(Japan) A Omae	6	3	6
(Mexico) V Rodríguez	3	1
2	(Czech Republic) M Bouzková	6	6

Second round
6	(Australia) E Perez	7	6
(United States) R Anderson	5	4
WC	(Canada) LA Fernandez	1	4
3	(Canada) B Andreescu	6	6
5	(Israel) J Glushko	6	6
(Japan) E Sema	4	3
Q	(Japan) A Omae	3	6	7^{8}
2	(Czech Republic) M Bouzková	6	3	6^{6}

Quarterfinals
6	(Australia) E Perez	7	4	5
3	(Canada) B Andreescu	5	6	7
5	(Israel) J Glushko	7^{8}	6
Q	(Japan) A Omae	6^{6}	3

Semifinals
3	(Canada) B Andreescu
5	(Israel) J Glushko	w/o
