= 2017 Challenger Banque Nationale de Granby =

- Date: July 24–30
- Edition: 24th (men); 7th (women)
- Category: ATP Challenger Tour; ITF Women's Circuit
- Prize money: US$100,000 (men); US$60,000 (women)
- Surface: Hard – outdoors
- Location: Granby, Quebec, Canada
- Venue: Club de tennis des Loisirs de Granby

Champions

Men's singles
- (Slovenia) Blaž Kavčič

Women's singles
- (Italy) Cristiana Ferrando

Men's doubles
- (United Kingdom) Joe Salisbury / (United States) Jackson Withrow

Women's doubles
- (Australia) Ellen Perez / (Canada) Carol Zhao
← 2016 ·	Challenger de Granby	· 2018 →

The 2017 Challenger Banque Nationale de Granby was a professional tennis tournament played on outdoor hard courts. It was the 24th edition, for men, and 7th edition, for women, of the tournament and part of the 2017 ATP Challenger Tour and the 2017 ITF Women's Circuit, offering totals of $100,000, for men, and $60,000, for women, in prize money. It took take place in Granby, Quebec, Canada between July 24 and 30, 2017.

== Men's singles main-draw entrants ==
=== Seeds ===
Country	Player	Rank^{1}	Seed
SLO	Blaž Kavčič	98	1
CAN	Peter Polansky	128	2
JPN	Go Soeda	145	3
CAN	Denis Shapovalov	161	4
TPE	Jason Jung	164	5
FRA	Vincent Millot	169	6
JPN	Tatsuma Ito	170	7
JPN	Yasutaka Uchiyama	172	8

- ^{1} Rankings are as of July 17, 2017

=== Other entrants ===
The following players received wildcards into the singles main draw:

- (Canada) Philip Bester
- (Canada) Frank Dancevic
- (Canada) Filip Peliwo
- (Canada) Benjamin Sigouin

The following player received entry into the singles main draw with a protected ranking:

- (Colombia) Alejandro González

The following player received entry into the singles main draw as an alternate:

- (Denmark) Mikael Torpegaard

The following players received entry from the qualifying draw:

- (United Kingdom) Liam Broady
- (Australia) Marinko Matosevic
- (Australia) Bradley Mousley
- (Japan) Kaichi Uchida

== Women's singles main-draw entrants ==
=== Seeds ===
Country	Player	Rank^{1}	Seed
CAN	Bianca Andreescu	156	1
CZE	Marie Bouzková	198	2
FRA	Chloé Paquet	205	3
AUS	Olivia Rogowska	233	4
HUN	Fanny Stollár	238	5
ISR	Deniz Khazaniuk	243	6
GBR	Katie Boulter	244	7
JPN	Mayo Hibi	245	8

- ^{1} Rankings are as of July 17, 2017

=== Other entrants ===
The following players received wildcards into the singles main draw:

- (Canada) Carson Branstine
- (Australia) Ellen Perez
- (Canada) Charlotte Robillard-Millette
- (Canada) Carol Zhao

The following player entered the singles main draw with a protected ranking:

- (Australia) Kimberly Birrell

The following players received entry from the qualifying draw:

- (United States) Jessica Failla
- (Chile) Alexa Guarachi
- (France) Jessika Ponchet
- (United States) Chanelle Van Nguyen

The following player received entry as a lucky loser:

- (Russia) Elena Bovina

== Champions ==
=== Men's singles ===
- (Slovenia) Blaž Kavčič def. (Canada) Peter Polansky, 6–3, 2–6, 7–5

=== Women's singles ===
- (Italy) Cristiana Ferrando def. (Canada) Katherine Sebov, 6–2, 6–3

=== Men's doubles ===
- (United Kingdom) Joe Salisbury / (United States) Jackson Withrow def. (Uruguay) Marcel Felder / (Japan) Go Soeda, 4–6, 6–3, [10–6]

=== Women's doubles ===
- (Australia) Ellen Perez / (Canada) Carol Zhao def. (Chile) Alexa Guarachi / (Australia) Olivia Tjandramulia, 6–2, 6–2
