= 2019 Fukuoka International Women's Cup – Doubles =

Doubles
- 2019 Fukuoka International Women's Cup

Final
- Champions: (United Kingdom) Naomi Broady (United Kingdom) Heather Watson
- Runners-up: (United States) Kristie Ahn (Australia) Alison Bai
- Score: Walkover

Events
Singles	Doubles
← 2018 ·	Fukuoka International Women's Cup	· 2023 →

Naomi Broady and Asia Muhammad were the defending champions, but Muhammad chose to participate at the 2019 FineMark Women's Pro Tennis Championship instead.

Broady partnered alongside compatriot Heather Watson, and successfully defended their title, after Kristie Ahn and Alison Bai gave a walkover in the final.

== Seeds ==
1. (United Kingdom) Naomi Broady / (United Kingdom) Heather Watson (champions)
2. (Japan) Hiroko Kuwata / (United States) Ena Shibahara (first round)
3. (Japan) Momoko Kobori / (Japan) Ayano Shimizu (first round)
4. (Turkey) Berfu Cengiz / (Indonesia) Jessy Rompies (first round)

== Draw ==
=== Key ===
- Q = Qualifier
- WC = Wild card
- LL = Lucky loser
- Alt = Alternate
- SE = Special exempt
- PR = Protected ranking
- ITF = ITF entry
- JE = Junior exempt
- w/o = Walkover
- r = Retired
- d = Defaulted
- SR = Special ranking

=== Draw ===
First round
1	(United Kingdom) N Broady (United Kingdom) H Watson	6	6
(Japan) H Arakawa (Japan) M Hontama	4	2
(Japan) E Hayashi (Japan) Y Naito	6	6
(Japan) M Ayukawa (Japan) R Ozaki	4	1
3	(Japan) M Kobori (Japan) A Shimizu	3	6	[7]
(Japan) K Morisaki (Japan) M Yonehara	6	4	[10]
(Japan) H Kaji (Japan) J Namigata	6	7^{8}
(Japan) N Hanatani (Japan) Y Tanaka	3	6^{6}
(Australia) M Inglis (Australia) K McPhee	6^{3}	6	[10]
(Australia) A Bozovic (Australia) O Tjandramulia	7^{7}	4	[7]
(Serbia) J Jakšić (Canada) R Marino	4	7^{7}	[10]
4	(Turkey) B Cengiz (Indonesia) J Rompies	6	6^{2}	[6]
(United Kingdom) K Dunne (United States) J Loeb	3	6	[10]
(United States) E Bektas (United Kingdom) T Moore	6	2	[8]
(United States) K Ahn (Australia) A Bai	7	7^{7}
2	(Japan) H Kuwata (United States) E Shibahara	5	6^{4}

Quarterfinals
1	(United Kingdom) N Broady (United Kingdom) H Watson	7^{7}	6
(Japan) E Hayashi (Japan) Y Naito	6^{2}	4
(Japan) K Morisaki (Japan) M Yonehara	6	6^{0}	[9]
(Japan) H Kaji (Japan) J Namigata	2	7^{7}	[11]
(Australia) M Inglis (Australia) K McPhee	6	6
(Serbia) J Jakšić (Canada) R Marino	3	2
(United Kingdom) K Dunne (United States) J Loeb	2	0^{r}
(United States) K Ahn (Australia) A Bai	6	1

Semifinals
1	(United Kingdom) N Broady (United Kingdom) H Watson	6^{2}	7^{7}	[10]
(Japan) H Kaji (Japan) J Namigata	7^{7}	6^{3}	[8]
(Australia) M Inglis (Australia) K McPhee	7	5	[8]
(United States) K Ahn (Australia) A Bai	5	7	[10]

Final
1	(United Kingdom) N Broady (United Kingdom) H Watson	w/o
(United States) K Ahn (Australia) A Bai
