= 2023 Fukuoka International Women's Cup – Singles =

Singles
- 2023 Fukuoka International Women's Cup

Final
- Champion: (Japan) Natsumi Kawaguchi
- Runner-up: (United Kingdom) Katie Boulter
- Score: Walkover

Events
Singles	Doubles
← 2019 ·	Fukuoka International Women's Cup	· 2024 →

Heather Watson was the defending champion but chose not to participate.

Natsumi Kawaguchi won the title after Katie Boulter withdrew before the final.

== Seeds ==
1. (United Kingdom) Katie Boulter (final)
2. (Canada) Carol Zhao (semifinals)
3. (Japan) Sakura Hosogi (second round)
4. (United States) Emina Bektas (semifinals)
5. (Australia) Lizette Cabrera (quarterfinals)
6. (Israel) Lina Glushko (first round)
7. (Japan) Haruka Kaji (first round)
8. (Chinese Taipei) Liang En-shuo (quarterfinals)

== Draw ==
=== Key ===
- Q = Qualifier
- WC = Wild card
- LL = Lucky loser
- Alt = Alternate
- SE = Special exempt
- PR = Protected ranking
- ITF = ITF entry
- JE = Junior exempt
- w/o = Walkover
- r = Retired
- d = Defaulted
- SR = Special ranking

=== Finals ===
Semifinals
1	(United Kingdom) Katie Boulter	2	6	7^{7}
4	(United States) Emina Bektas	6	4	6^{5}
Q	(Japan) Natsumi Kawaguchi	6	7^{8}
2	(Canada) Carol Zhao	1	6^{6}

Final
1	(United Kingdom) Katie Boulter
Q	(Japan) Natsumi Kawaguchi	w/o

=== Top half ===
First round
1	(United Kingdom) K Boulter	6	6
Q	(Japan) M Yamaguchi	4	1
Q	(Japan) M Ozeki	4	3
(Japan) E Shimizu	6	6
(Japan) S Imamura	6	6
Q	(Japan) Y Hosoki	0	1
(Japan) M Kobori	1	0
8	(Chinese Taipei) E-s Liang	6	6
4	(United States) E Bektas	6	6
SR	(Japan) A Shimizu	3	2
Q	(Japan) J Namigata	6	6
WC	(Japan) R Matsuda	1	2
Q	(United States) T Kinard	0	0^{r}
(Japan) R Saigo	6	1
(China) Y Wang	0	4
5	(Australia) L Cabrera	6	6

Second round
1	(United Kingdom) K Boulter	6	6
(Japan) E Shimizu	1	0
(Japan) S Imamura	1	2
8	(Chinese Taipei) E-s Liang	6	6
4	(United States) E Bektas	6	6
Q	(Japan) J Namigata	1	1
(Japan) R Saigo	6^{3}	2
5	(Australia) L Cabrera	7^{7}	6

Quarterfinals
1	(United Kingdom) K Boulter	6	4	7^{7}
8	(Chinese Taipei) E-s Liang	3	6	6^{5}
4	(United States) E Bektas	6	6
5	(Australia) L Cabrera	2	2

Semifinals
1	(United Kingdom) K Boulter	2	6	7^{7}
4	(United States) E Bektas	6	4	6^{5}

=== Bottom half ===
First round
7	(Japan) H Kaji	5	6^{0}
Q	(Japan) S Saito	7	7^{7}
(Japan) N Hanatani	3	2
(Chinese Taipei) P-c Lee	6	6
Q	(Japan) A Ito	4	5
Q	(Japan) N Kawaguchi	6	7
(Australia) T Gibson	4	6	0
3	(Japan) S Hosogi	6	1	6
6	(Israel) L Glushko	4	2
(Australia) A Parnaby	6	6
WC	(Japan) L-M Rioux	0	6	4
(China) Y Ma	6	0	6
WC	(Japan) A Yamaguchi	0	2
(Japan) E Sema	6	6
WC	(Japan) A Nagata	2	1
2	(Canada) C Zhao	6	6

Second round
Q	(Japan) S Saito	6	6
(Chinese Taipei) P-c Lee	0	3
Q	(Japan) N Kawaguchi	6	6
3	(Japan) S Hosogi	1	4
(Australia) A Parnaby	5	6^{2}
(China) Y Ma	7	7^{7}
(Japan) E Sema	2	7	3
2	(Canada) C Zhao	6	5	6

Quarterfinals
Q	(Japan) S Saito	6	6^{4}	6^{4}
Q	(Japan) N Kawaguchi	1	7^{7}	7^{7}
(China) Y Ma	4	2
2	(Canada) C Zhao	6	6

Semifinals
Q	(Japan) N Kawaguchi	6	7^{8}
2	(Canada) C Zhao	1	6^{6}
