= 2024 Fukuoka International Women's Cup – Singles =

Singles
- 2024 Fukuoka International Women's Cup

Final
- Champion: (Australia) Kimberly Birrell
- Runner-up: (United States) Emina Bektas
- Score: 6–2, 6–4

Events
Singles	Doubles
← 2023 ·	Fukuoka International Women's Cup	· 2025 →

Natsumi Kawaguchi was the defending champion but lost in the second round to Ma Yexin.

Kimberly Birrell won the title, defeating Emina Bektas in the final, 6–2, 6–4.

== Seeds ==
1. (Australia) Arina Rodionova (quarterfinals)
2. (United States) Emina Bektas (final)
3. (Australia) Kimberly Birrell (champion)
4. (China) Ma Yexin (quarterfinals)
5. (Thailand) Mananchaya Sawangkaew (second round)
6. (Canada) Carol Zhao (quarterfinals)
7. (Canada) Stacey Fung (first round)
8. (South Korea) Jang Su-jeong (semifinals)

== Draw ==
=== Key ===
- Q = Qualifier
- WC = Wild card
- LL = Lucky loser
- Alt = Alternate
- SE = Special exempt
- PR = Protected ranking
- ITF = ITF entry
- JE = Junior exempt
- w/o = Walkover
- r = Retired
- d = Defaulted
- SR = Special ranking

=== Finals ===
Semifinals
(Japan) Ayano Shimizu	6	4	4
3	(Australia) Kimberly Birrell	4	6	6
8	(South Korea) Jang Su-jeong	6^{6}	6	5
2	(United States) Emina Bektas	7^{8}	4	7

Final
3	(Australia) Kimberly Birrell	6	6
2	(United States) Emina Bektas	2	4

=== Top half ===
First round
1	(Australia) Ar Rodionova	6	6
Q	(South Korea) D-b Kim	3	3
Q	(Japan) M Yamaguchi	6	6
WC	(Japan) C Miyahara	3	0
Q	(Australia) P Hule	6	6
(Japan) N Sato	4	3
(Japan) A Shimizu	2	6	7^{9}
7	(Canada) S Fung	6	1	6^{7}
3	(Australia) K Birrell	6	6
Q	(Japan) L-M Rioux	2	0
Q	(Japan) H Arakawa	3	4
(Chinese Taipei) E-s Liang	6	6
(Japan) A Ito	7	6
(Japan) H Kaji	5	2
(Japan) Y Naito	3	4
5	(Thailand) M Sawangkaew	6	6

Second round
1	(Australia) Ar Rodionova	6	6
Q	(Japan) M Yamaguchi	3	1
Q	(Australia) P Hule	4	0
(Japan) A Shimizu	6	6
3	(Australia) K Birrell	6	7^{7}
(Chinese Taipei) E-s Liang	4	6^{3}
(Japan) A Ito	6	6
5	(Thailand) M Sawangkaew	3	1

Quarterfinals
1	(Australia) Ar Rodionova	5	6	2
(Japan) A Shimizu	7	1	6
3	(Australia) K Birrell	7^{8}	7
(Japan) A Ito	6^{6}	5

Semifinals
(Japan) A Shimizu	6	4	4
3	(Australia) K Birrell	4	6	6

=== Bottom half ===
First round
8	(South Korea) S-j Jang	2	6	6
(Australia) L Cabrera	6	3	1
(India) R Bhosale	5	3
SR	(Kazakhstan) Z Diyas	7	6
WC	(Japan) N Kawaguchi	6	7^{7}
(Chinese Taipei) Y-h Lee	1	6^{4}
(Australia) M Inglis	6	6^{5}	5
4	(China) Y Ma	4	7^{7}	7
6	(Canada) C Zhao	6	6
Q	(United Kingdom) SB Grey	3	4
Q	(Japan) M Kuramochi	6	6
WC	(Japan) S Imamura	3	4
WC	(Japan) S Nishimoto	4	1
P Iatcenko	6	6
Q	(Japan) E Shimizu	6^{4}	0
2	(United States) E Bektas	7^{7}	6

Second round
8	(South Korea) S-j Jang	6	6
SR	(Kazakhstan) Z Diyas	4	4
WC	(Japan) N Kawaguchi	1	4
4	(China) Y Ma	6	6
6	(Canada) C Zhao	6	7
Q	(Japan) M Kuramochi	2	5
P Iatcenko	1	4
2	(United States) E Bektas	6	6

Quarterfinals
8	(South Korea) S-j Jang	6	6
4	(China) Y Ma	4	4
6	(Canada) C Zhao	6^{8}	6	6^{5}
2	(United States) E Bektas	7^{10}	4	7^{7}

Semifinals
8	(South Korea) S-j Jang	6^{6}	6	5
2	(United States) E Bektas	7^{8}	4	7
