= 2019 Challenger Banque Nationale de Granby – Men's singles =

Men's singles
- 2019 Challenger Banque Nationale de Granby

Final
- Champion: (United States) Ernesto Escobedo
- Runner-up: (Japan) Yasutaka Uchiyama
- Score: 7–6^{(7–5)}, 6–4

Events
| Singles | men | women |
| Doubles | men | women |
| ← 2018 · | Challenger de Granby | · 2022 → |

Peter Polansky was the defending champion but lost in the semifinals to Yasutaka Uchiyama.

Ernesto Escobedo won the title after defeating Uchiyama 7–6^{(7–5)}, 6–4 in the final.

== Seeds ==
All seeds receive a bye into the second round.

1. (Slovakia) Norbert Gombos (third round)
2. (Canada) Peter Polansky (semifinals)
3. (Japan) Yasutaka Uchiyama (final)
4. (Canada) Vasek Pospisil (third round)
5. (France) Maxime Janvier (second round)
6. (France) Enzo Couacaud (quarterfinals)
7. (Australia) Andrew Harris (third round)
8. (Australia) Jason Kubler (withdrew)
9. (Canada) Steven Diez (quarterfinals)
10. (China) Li Zhe (quarterfinals)
11. (Japan) Yosuke Watanuki (second round)
12. (Australia) Akira Santillan (second round)
13. (Japan) Hiroki Moriya (quarterfinals)
14. (Japan) Kaichi Uchida (second round)
15. (Australia) Maverick Banes (second round)
16. (Serbia) Danilo Petrović (third round)

== Draw ==
=== Key ===
- Q = Qualifier
- WC = Wild card
- LL = Lucky loser
- Alt = Alternate
- ITF = ITF entry
- PR = Protected ranking
- SR = Special ranking
- SE = Special exempt
- JE = Junior exempt
- JR = Junior Accelerator Programme entrant
- CO = College Accelerator Programme entrant
- NG = Next Gen Accelerator Program entrant
- w/o = Walkover
- r = Retired
- d = Defaulted

=== Finals ===
Quarterfinals
13 | (Japan) Hiroki Moriya | 6^{2} | 4
(Croatia) Borna Gojo | 7^{7} | 6
(United States) Ernesto Escobedo | 7 | 7
6 | (France) Enzo Couacaud | 5 | 5
10 | (China) Li Zhe | 7^{7} | 4 | 1
3 | (Japan) Yasutaka Uchiyama | 6^{3} | 6 | 6
9 | (Canada) Steven Diez | 3 | 6^{4}
2 | (Canada) Peter Polansky | 6 | 7^{7}

Semifinals
(Croatia) Borna Gojo | 7^{7} | 6^{3} | 2
(United States) Ernesto Escobedo | 6^{3} | 7^{7} | 6
3 | (Japan) Yasutaka Uchiyama | 7^{9} | 6
2 | (Canada) Peter Polansky | 6^{7} | 4

Final
(United States) Ernesto Escobedo | 7^{7} | 6
3 | (Japan) Yasutaka Uchiyama | 6^{5} | 4

=== Top half ===
==== Section 1 ====
First round
ITF | (United Kingdom) E Hoyt | 4 | 6 | 6^{5}
ITF | (Tunisia) S Mansouri | 6 | 3 | 7^{7}
WC | (Canada) T Baadi | 7^{7} | 4 | 2
(Canada) B Sigouin | 6^{0} | 6 | 6
(Austria) M Neuchrist | 6 | 7^{7}
(United States) D Novikov | 4 | 6^{4}
(Croatia) B Gojo | 6 | 6
WC | (Canada) J Boulais | 2 | 2

Second round
1 | (Slovakia) N Gombos | 6 | 7
ITF | (Tunisia) S Mansouri | 4 | 5
(Canada) B Sigouin | 3 | 7^{7} | 3
13 | (Japan) H Moriya | 6 | 6^{5} | 6
12 | (Australia) A Santillan | 0 | 7^{7} | 4
(Austria) M Neuchrist | 6 | 6^{5} | 6
(Croatia) B Gojo | 6 | 6
Alt | (Sweden) A Göransson | 4 | 3

Third round
1 | (Slovakia) N Gombos | 3 | 6^{5}
13 | (Japan) H Moriya | 6 | 7^{7}
(Austria) M Neuchrist | 3 | 0^{r}
(Croatia) B Gojo | 6 | 3

Quarterfinals
13 | (Japan) H Moriya | 6^{2} | 4
(Croatia) B Gojo | 7^{7} | 6

==== Section 2 ====
First round
ITF | (Canada) Joshua Peck | 6 | 6
(Germany) Tobias Simon | 4 | 4
(United States) E Escobedo | 6 | 3 | 6
Alt | (Netherlands) S Verbeek | 3 | 6 | 2
ITF | (United States) Alexander Lebedev | 3 | 6 | 0
(France) G Sakharov | 6 | 1 | 6
(United States) E Zhu | 6 | 5 | 6
(Monaco) H Nys | 4 | 7 | 3

Second round
4/WC | (Canada) V Pospisil | 6 | 6
ITF | (Canada) J Peck | 3 | 3
(United States) E Escobedo | 7 | 6
14 | (Japan) K Uchida | 5 | 3
11 | (Japan) Yo Watanuki | 4 | 5
(France) G Sakharov | 6 | 7
(United States) E Zhu | 4 | 6 | 3
6 | (France) E Couacaud | 6 | 3 | 6

Third round
4/WC | (Canada) V Pospisil | 6 | 2 | 3
(United States) E Escobedo | 4 | 6 | 6
(France) G Sakharov | 1 | 4
6 | (France) E Couacaud | 6 | 6

Quarterfinals
(United States) E Escobedo | 7 | 7
6 | (France) E Couacaud | 5 | 5

=== Bottom half ===
==== Section 3 ====
First round
(Turkey) C İlkel | 6 | 6
(Australia) Jacob Grills | 1 | 0
ITF | (Japan) Issei Okamura | 4 | 4
(Zimbabwe) T Garanganga | 6 | 6
(United States) A Sarkissian | 7 | 6
WC | (Canada) Nicaise Muamba | 5 | 2
(Canada) Pavel Krainik | 6 | 6^{6} | 0
(Mexico) M Sánchez | 3 | 7^{8} | 6

Second round
5 | (France) M Janvier | 5 | 3
(Turkey) C İlkel | 7 | 6
(Zimbabwe) T Garanganga | 6^{3} | 6^{6}
10 | (China) Z Li | 7^{7} | 7^{8}
16 | (Serbia) D Petrović | 7^{7} | 6
(United States) A Sarkissian | 6^{5} | 4
(Mexico) M Sánchez | 4 | 1^{r}
3 | (Japan) Y Uchiyama | 6 | 4

Third round
(Turkey) C İlkel | 6 | 6^{3} | 5
10 | (China) Z Li | 4 | 7^{7} | 7
16 | (Serbia) D Petrović | 4 | 4
3 | (Japan) Y Uchiyama | 6 | 6

Quarterfinals
10 | (China) Z Li | 7^{7} | 4 | 1
3 | (Japan) Y Uchiyama | 6^{3} | 6 | 6

==== Section 4 ====
First round
ITF | (Belgium) Y Mertens | 6 | 6
Q | (Canada) Kooros Ghasemi | 2 | 0
WC | (United States) B Holt | 6 | 6
(Canada) L Draxl | 4 | 4
(Canada) A Galarneau | 6 | 7^{7}
Q | (United States) H Reese | 2 | 6^{2}
(United Kingdom) B Klein | 6^{8} | 5
ITF | (United States) Jordi Arconada | 7^{10} | 7

Second round
7 | (Australia) A Harris | 6 | 6
ITF | (Belgium) Y Mertens | 1 | 1
WC | (United States) B Holt | 2 | 4
9 | (Canada) S Diez | 6 | 6
15 | (Australia) M Banes | 3 | 2
(Canada) A Galarneau | 6 | 6
ITF | (United States) J Arconada | 1 | 6 | 2
2 | (Canada) P Polansky | 6 | 4 | 6

Third round
7 | (Australia) A Harris | 4 | 2
9 | (Canada) S Diez | 6 | 6
(Canada) A Galarneau | 5 | 2
2 | (Canada) P Polansky | 7 | 6

Quarterfinals
9 | (Canada) S Diez | 3 | 6^{4}
2 | (Canada) P Polansky | 6 | 7^{7}
