= 2018 Challenger Banque Nationale de Granby – Men's doubles =

Men's doubles
- 2018 Challenger Banque Nationale de Granby

Final
- Champions: (United States) Alex Lawson (China) Li Zhe
- Runners-up: (United States) JC Aragone (United Kingdom) Liam Broady
- Score: 7–6^{(7–2)}, 6–3

Events
Singles	men	women
Doubles	men	women
← 2017 ·	Challenger de Granby	· 2019 →

Joe Salisbury and Jackson Withrow were the defending champions but chose not to defend their title.

Alex Lawson and Li Zhe won the title after defeating JC Aragone and Liam Broady 7–6^{(7–2)}, 6–3 in the final.

== Seeds ==
1. (Australia) Matt Reid / (Japan) Yasutaka Uchiyama (semifinals)
2. (Australia) Bradley Mousley / (Austria) Maximilian Neuchrist (first round)
3. (United States) Alex Lawson / (China) Li Zhe (champions)
4. (United States) JC Aragone / (United Kingdom) Liam Broady (final)

== Draw ==
=== Key ===
- Q = Qualifier
- WC = Wild card
- LL = Lucky loser
- Alt = Alternate
- ITF = ITF entry
- PR = Protected ranking
- SR = Special ranking
- SE = Special exempt
- JE = Junior exempt
- JR = Junior Accelerator Programme entrant
- CO = College Accelerator Programme entrant
- NG = Next Gen Accelerator Program entrant
- w/o = Walkover
- r = Retired
- d = Defaulted

First round
(Canada) F Dancevic (Canada) P Polansky	6	6^{3}	[10]
WC	(Canada) T Baadi (Canada) J Boulais	3	7^{7}	[6]
4	(United States) JC Aragone (United Kingdom) L Broady	4	6	[11]
(Japan) Shintaro Imai (Japan) K Uchida	6	4	[9]
(Canada) A Galarneau (Canada) B Sigouin	w/o
(United States) T Fawcett (United States) Tyler Lu
(United Kingdom) L Johnson (Brazil) J Menezes	6	3	[10]
WC	(Canada) JM Lin (Canada) Nicaise Muamba	4	6	[7]
WC	(Canada) Washi Gervais (Canada) K Stevenson	4	3
3	(United States) A Lawson (China) Z Li	6	6
(Canada) Pavel Krainik (Canada) Samuel Monette	4	6^{5}
(Belgium) J De Loore (Slovakia) N Gombos	6	7^{7}
(Australia) J Frawley (Australia) Jacob Grills	6	6
2	(Australia) B Mousley (Austria) M Neuchrist	2	3

Quarterfinals
1	(Australia) M Reid (Japan) Y Uchiyama	6	3	[10]
(Canada) F Dancevic (Canada) P Polansky	3	6	[7]
4	(United States) JC Aragone (United Kingdom) L Broady	w/o
(Canada) A Galarneau (Canada) B Sigouin
(United Kingdom) L Johnson (Brazil) J Menezes	7^{9}	1	[9]
3	(United States) A Lawson (China) Z Li	6^{7}	6	[11]
(Belgium) J De Loore (Slovakia) N Gombos	6	7^{9}
(Australia) J Frawley (Australia) J Grills	1	6^{7}

Semifinals
1	(Australia) M Reid (Japan) Y Uchiyama	3	6	[4]
4	(United States) JC Aragone (United Kingdom) L Broady	6	3	[10]
3	(United States) A Lawson (China) Z Li	6	4	[10]
(Belgium) J De Loore (Slovakia) N Gombos	2	6	[6]

Final
4	(United States) JC Aragone (United Kingdom) L Broady	6^{2}	3
3	(United States) A Lawson (China) Z Li	7^{7}	6
