= 2019 Challenger Banque Nationale de Granby =

Professional tennis tournament held in Canada

- Date: 22–28 July 2019
- Edition: 26th (men); 9th (women)
- Category: ATP Challenger Tour; ITF Women's World Tennis Tour
- Prize money: $81,240 (men) $80,000 (women)
- Surface: Hard
- Location: Granby, Quebec, Canada

Champions

Men's singles
- (United States) Ernesto Escobedo

Women's singles
- (Australia) Lizette Cabrera

Men's doubles
- (Sweden) André Göransson / (Netherlands) Sem Verbeek

Women's doubles
- (Japan) Haruka Kaji / (Japan) Junri Namigata
← 2018 ·	Challenger de Granby	· 2022 →

The 2019 Challenger Banque Nationale de Granby was a professional tennis tournament played on outdoor hard courts. It was the twenty-sixth (men) and ninth (women) editions of the tournament which was part of the 2019 ATP Challenger Tour and the 2019 ITF Women's World Tennis Tour. It took place in Granby, Quebec, Canada between 22 and 28 July 2019.

== Men's singles main-draw entrants ==
=== Seeds ===
Country	Player	Rank^{1}	Seed
SVK	Norbert Gombos	133	1
CAN	Peter Polansky	143	2
JPN	Yasutaka Uchiyama	168	3
CAN	Vasek Pospisil	186	4
FRA	Maxime Janvier	194	5
FRA	Enzo Couacaud	201	6
AUS	Andrew Harris	204	7
~~AUS~~	~~Jason Kubler~~	~~211~~	~~8~~
CAN	Steven Diez	215	9
CHN	Li Zhe	220	10
JPN	Yosuke Watanuki	223	11
AUS	Akira Santillan	226	12
JPN	Hiroki Moriya	230	13
JPN	Kaichi Uchida	243	14
AUS	Maverick Banes	248	15
SRB	Danilo Petrović	250	16

- ^{1} Rankings are as of July 15, 2019.

=== Other entrants ===
The following players received wildcards into the singles main draw:

- (Canada) Taha Baadi
- (Canada) Justin Boulais
- (United States) Brandon Holt
- (Canada) Nicaise Muamba
- (Canada) Vasek Pospisil

The following players received entry into the singles main draw as alternates:

- (Sweden) André Göransson
- (Netherlands) Sem Verbeek

The following players received entry into the singles main draw using their ITF World Tennis Ranking:

- (United States) Jordi Arconada
- (United Kingdom) Evan Hoyt
- (United States) Alexander Lebedev
- (Tunisia) Skander Mansouri
- (Belgium) Yannick Mertens
- (Japan) Issei Okamura
- (Canada) Joshua Peck

The following players received entry from the qualifying draw:

- (Canada) Kooros Ghasemi
- (United States) Hunter Reese

== Women's singles main-draw entrants ==
=== Seeds ===
Country	Player	Rank^{1}	Seed
JPN	Nao Hibino	130	1
CAN	Rebecca Marino	143	2
USA	Francesca Di Lorenzo	153	3
USA	Sachia Vickery	163	4
~~FRA~~	~~Jessika Ponchet~~	~~188~~	~~5~~
CAN	Katherine Sebov	219	6
AUS	Maddison Inglis	238	7
~~AUS~~	~~Olivia Rogowska~~	~~242~~	~~8~~
JPN	Risa Ozaki	253	9
JPN	Momoko Kobori	259	10

- ^{1} Rankings are as of 15 July 2019.

=== Other entrants ===
The following players received wildcards into the singles main draw:

- (Canada) Françoise Abanda
- ~~(Canada) Carson Branstine~~
- (Canada) Petra Januskova
- (Canada) Carol Zhao

The following players received entry from the qualifying draw:

- (Canada) Ariana Arseneault
- (Romania) Andreea Ghițescu
- (Russia) Nika Kukharchuk
- (Russia) Anna Morgina
- (United States) Ingrid Neel
- (New Zealand) Erin Routliffe

The following player received entry as a Lucky Loser:

- (Canada) Layne Sleeth

== Champions ==
=== Men's singles ===
- (United States) Ernesto Escobedo def. (Japan) Yasutaka Uchiyama 7–6^{(7–5)}, 6–4.

=== Women's singles ===
- (Australia) Lizette Cabrera def. (Canada) Leylah Annie Fernandez, 6–1, 6–4

=== Men's doubles ===
- (Sweden) André Göransson / (Netherlands) Sem Verbeek def. (China) Li Zhe / (Monaco) Hugo Nys 6–2, 6–4.

=== Women's doubles ===
- (Japan) Haruka Kaji / (Japan) Junri Namigata def. (United States) Quinn Gleason / (United States) Ingrid Neel, 7–6^{(7–5)}, 5–7, [10–8]
