= 2019 Fukuoka International Women's Cup – Singles =

Singles
- 2019 Fukuoka International Women's Cup

Final
- Champion: (United Kingdom) Heather Watson
- Runner-up: (Kazakhstan) Zarina Diyas
- Score: 7–6^{(7–1)}, 7–6^{(7–4)}

Events
Singles	Doubles
← 2018 ·	Fukuoka International Women's Cup	· 2023 →

Katie Boulter was the defending champion, but chose not to participate.

Heather Watson won the title, defeating Zarina Diyas in the final, 7–6^{(7–1)}, 7–6^{(7–4)}.

== Seeds ==
1. (Kazakhstan) Zarina Diyas (final)
2. (United Kingdom) Heather Watson (champion)
3. (Japan) Ayano Shimizu (quarterfinals)
4. (United States) Kristie Ahn (semifinals, retired)
5. (Chinese Taipei) Liang En-shuo (quarterfinals)
6. (Canada) Rebecca Marino (semifinals)
7. (Japan) Momoko Kobori (second round)
8. (United States) Jamie Loeb (first round)

== Draw ==
=== Key ===
- Q = Qualifier
- WC = Wild card
- LL = Lucky loser
- Alt = Alternate
- SE = Special exempt
- PR = Protected ranking
- ITF = ITF entry
- JE = Junior exempt
- w/o = Walkover
- r = Retired
- d = Defaulted
- SR = Special ranking

=== Finals ===
Semifinals
1	(Kazakhstan) Zarina Diyas	6	6
6	(Canada) Rebecca Marino	2	3
4	(United States) Kristie Ahn	3	2^{r}
2	(United Kingdom) Heather Watson	6	2

Final
1	(Kazakhstan) Zarina Diyas	6^{1}	6^{4}
2	(United Kingdom) Heather Watson	7^{7}	7^{7}

=== Top half ===
First round
1	(Kazakhstan) Z Diyas	5	6	6
(Australia) A Bai	7	3	2
WC	(Japan) M Ayukawa	6	3	6
(Japan) H Kaji	4	6	2
WC	(Japan) M Uchijima	4	2
(Turkey) B Cengiz	6	6
(Japan) R Ozaki	6	6^{7}	6
8	(United States) J Loeb	1	7^{9}	2
3	(Japan) A Shimizu	4	7^{7}	6
WC	(Japan) Y Naito	6	6^{5}	3
(Australia) M Inglis	4
(United Kingdom) K Dunne	3^{r}
Q	(Japan) S Akita	6	2	6
(South Korea) S-j Jang	4	6	3
Q	(Japan) M Hontama	1	1
6	(Canada) R Marino	6	6

Second round
1	(Kazakhstan) Z Diyas	6	6
WC	(Japan) M Ayukawa	1	0
(Turkey) B Cengiz	3	3
(Japan) R Ozaki	6	6
3	(Japan) A Shimizu	2	7	6
(Australia) M Inglis	6	5	4
Q	(Japan) S Akita	5	6^{3}
6	(Canada) R Marino	7	7^{7}

Quarterfinals
1	(Kazakhstan) Z Diyas	6	6
(Japan) R Ozaki	0	2
3	(Japan) A Shimizu	3	4
6	(Canada) R Marino	6	6

Semifinals
1	(Kazakhstan) Z Diyas	6	6
6	(Canada) R Marino	2	3

=== Bottom half ===
First round
7	(Japan) M Kobori	6	3	6
(Australia) K McPhee	4	6	3
Q	(United States) E Shibahara	4	3
Q	(United States) E Bektas	6	6
WC	(Japan) K Morisaki	2	5
(Serbia) J Jakšić	6	7
(Japan) E Hozumi	1	5
4	(United States) K Ahn	6	7
5	(Chinese Taipei) E-s Liang	6^{5}	7	6
(Japan) M Imanishi	7^{7}	5	2
(United Kingdom) N Broady	6	7^{8}
(Japan) J Namigata	3	6^{6}
Q	(Switzerland) L Küng	6	6
(Japan) H Kuwata	3	2
Q	(Japan) H Sakatsume	2	1
2	(United Kingdom) H Watson	6	6

Second round
7	(Japan) M Kobori	6^{6}	1
Q	(United States) E Bektas	7^{8}	6
(Serbia) J Jakšić	3	4
4	(United States) K Ahn	6	6
5	(Chinese Taipei) E-s Liang	6	6
(United Kingdom) N Broady	3	3
Q	(Switzerland) L Küng	2	4
2	(United Kingdom) H Watson	6	6

Quarterfinals
Q	(United States) E Bektas	4	6	0
4	(United States) K Ahn	6	3	6
5	(Chinese Taipei) E-s Liang	2	2
2	(United Kingdom) H Watson	6	6

Semifinals
4	(United States) K Ahn	3	2^{r}
2	(United Kingdom) H Watson	6	2
