= 2018 Fukuoka International Women's Cup – Singles =

Singles
- 2018 Fukuoka International Women's Cup

Final
- Champion: (United Kingdom) Katie Boulter
- Runner-up: (Russia) Ksenia Lykina
- Score: 5–7, 6–4, 6–2

Events
Singles	Doubles
← 2017 ·	Fukuoka International Women's Cup	· 2019 →

Magdaléna Rybáriková was the defending champion, but chose to compete in Madrid instead.

Katie Boulter won the title, defeating Ksenia Lykina in the final, 5–7, 6–4, 6–2.

== Seeds ==
1. (United Kingdom) Naomi Broady (quarterfinals)
2. (Australia) Arina Rodionova (semifinals)
3. (South Korea) Jang Su-jeong (second round)
4. (United Kingdom) Gabriella Taylor (first round)
5. (United Kingdom) Katie Boulter (champion)
6. (Japan) Miharu Imanishi (withdrew)
7. (Japan) Junri Namigata (second round)
8. (United Kingdom) Laura Robson (first round)

== Draw ==
=== Key ===
- Q = Qualifier
- WC = Wild card
- LL = Lucky loser
- Alt = Alternate
- SE = Special exempt
- PR = Protected ranking
- ITF = ITF entry
- JE = Junior exempt
- w/o = Walkover
- r = Retired
- d = Defaulted
- SR = Special ranking

=== Finals ===
Semifinals
5	(United Kingdom) Katie Boulter	6	6
(Japan) Momoko Kobori	1	4
(Russia) Ksenia Lykina	6	6
2	(Australia) Arina Rodionova	1	4

Final
5	(United Kingdom) Katie Boulter	5	6	6
(Russia) Ksenia Lykina	7	4	2

=== Top half ===
First round
1	(United Kingdom) N Broady	6	7^{7}
(Japan) A Shimizu	1	6^{4}
(Papua New Guinea) A Tere-Apisah	6	6
(Japan) C Muramatsu	3	2
(Japan) H Kaji	6^{4}	3
(Australia) T Patterson	7^{7}	6
WC	(Japan) Y Naito	6	4	4
5	(United Kingdom) K Boulter	4	6	6
3	(South Korea) S-j Jang	6	6
LL	(Japan) A Yoshitomi	1	2
(Japan) M Kobori	6	2	6
WC	(Japan) N Sato	3	6	1
(Serbia) I Jorović	6	7^{7}
(Japan) H Kuwata	2	6^{3}
(United States) J Cako	1	4
7	(Japan) J Namigata	6	6

Second round
1	(United Kingdom) N Broady	6	6
(Papua New Guinea) A Tere-Apisah	2	2
(Australia) T Patterson	3	1
5	(United Kingdom) K Boulter	6	6
3	(South Korea) S-j Jang	6^{4}	4
(Japan) M Kobori	7^{7}	6
(Serbia) I Jorović	7^{7}	6
7	(Japan) J Namigata	6^{2}	4

Quarterfinals
1	(United Kingdom) N Broady	4	6	2
5	(United Kingdom) K Boulter	6	3	6
(Japan) M Kobori	3	7	6
(Serbia) I Jorović	6	5	2

Semifinals
5	(United Kingdom) K Boulter	6	6
(Japan) M Kobori	1	4

=== Bottom half ===
First round
8	(United Kingdom) L Robson	5	4
(United Kingdom) K Dunne	7	6
(Switzerland) A Sadiković	7^{7}	6
(Japan) S Akita	6^{5}	2
Q	(Australia) O Tjandramulia	7^{7}	6
(Japan) M Inoue	6^{5}	4
(Russia) K Lykina	6^{3}	6	6
4	(United Kingdom) G Taylor	7^{7}	1	2
LL	(Japan) N Hanatani	2	4
WC	(Japan) M Eguchi	6	6
Q	(Japan) R Fujiwara	6	6
LL	(Japan) E Hayashi	4	4
Q	(United Kingdom) T Moore	6	2	6
(United States) A Muhammad	2	6	3
WC	(Japan) M Yamaguchi	0	5
2	(Australia) Ar Rodionova	6	7

Second round
(United Kingdom) K Dunne	7	6
(Switzerland) A Sadiković	5	2
Q	(Australia) O Tjandramulia	4	1
(Russia) K Lykina	6	6
WC	(Japan) M Eguchi	4	4
Q	(Japan) R Fujiwara	6	6
Q	(United Kingdom) T Moore	6	0	1
2	(Australia) Ar Rodionova	3	6	6

Quarterfinals
(United Kingdom) K Dunne	2	1
(Russia) K Lykina	6	6
Q	(Japan) R Fujiwara	6	2	3
2	(Australia) Ar Rodionova	4	6	6

Semifinals
(Russia) K Lykina	6	6
2	(Australia) Ar Rodionova	1	4
