= 2019 Challenger Banque Nationale de Granby – Women's singles =

Women's singles
- 2019 Challenger Banque Nationale de Granby

Final
- Champion: (Australia) Lizette Cabrera
- Runner-up: (Canada) Leylah Annie Fernandez
- Score: 6–1, 6–4

Events
Singles	men	women
Doubles	men	women
← 2018 ·	Challenger de Granby	· 2022 →

Julia Glushko was the defending champion, but chose not to participate.

Lizette Cabrera won the title, defeating Leylah Annie Fernandez in the final, 6–1, 6–4.

== Seeds ==
1. (Japan) Nao Hibino (second round)
2. (Canada) Rebecca Marino (first round, retired)
3. (United States) Francesca Di Lorenzo (quarterfinals)
4. (United States) Sachia Vickery (second round)
5. (France) Jessika Ponchet (withdrew)
6. (Canada) Katherine Sebov (semifinals)
7. (Australia) Maddison Inglis (quarterfinals)
8. (Australia) Olivia Rogowska (withdrew)
9. (Japan) Risa Ozaki (first round, retired)
10. (Japan) Momoko Kobori (first round)

== Draw ==
=== Key ===
- Q = Qualifier
- WC = Wild card
- LL = Lucky loser
- Alt = Alternate
- ITF = ITF entry
- PR = Protected ranking
- SR = Special ranking
- SE = Special exempt
- JE = Junior exempt
- JR = Junior Accelerator Programme entrant
- CO = College Accelerator Programme entrant
- NG = Next Gen Accelerator Program entrant
- w/o = Walkover
- r = Retired
- d = Defaulted

=== Finals ===
Semifinals
(Canada) Leylah Annie Fernandez	6	5	7^{8}
WC	(Canada) Françoise Abanda	3	7	6^{6}
(Australia) Lizette Cabrera	3	6	6
6	(Canada) Katherine Sebov	6	1	0

Final
(Canada) Leylah Annie Fernandez	1	4
(Australia) Lizette Cabrera	6	6

=== Top half ===
First round
1	(Japan) N Hibino	6	6
(United Kingdom) E Webley-Smith	2	4
(Canada) LA Fernandez	6	6
WC	(Canada) P Januskova	2	3
(United States) E Halbauer	6	6
(Japan) H Kuwata	4	1
Q	(Romania) A Ghițescu	4	5
7	(Australia) M Inglis	6	7
4	(United States) S Vickery	6	6
Q	(Russia) N Kukharchuk	1	2
Q	(United States) I Neel	2	2
WC	(Canada) F Abanda	6	6
(Australia) O Tjandramulia	3	3
(Japan) J Namigata	6	6
(Japan) M Hibi	6	6
10	(Japan) M Kobori	2	4

Second round
1	(Japan) N Hibino	3	6^{4}
(Canada) LA Fernandez	6	7^{7}
(United States) E Halbauer	7^{7}	6^{5}	4
7	(Australia) M Inglis	6^{0}	7^{7}	6
4	(United States) S Vickery	3	6	4
WC	(Canada) F Abanda	6	1	6
(Japan) J Namigata	4	3
(Japan) M Hibi	6	6

Quarterfinals
(Canada) LA Fernandez	6	6
7	(Australia) M Inglis	3	4
WC	(Canada) F Abanda	7^{7}	6
(Japan) M Hibi	6^{3}	3

Semifinals
(Canada) LA Fernandez	6	5	7^{8}
WC	(Canada) F Abanda	3	7	6^{6}

=== Bottom half ===
First round
9	(Japan) R Ozaki	6	4	1^{r}
(Japan) Y Tanaka	2	6	2
(Australia) L Cabrera	6	7
(Switzerland) S Bandecchi	3	5
Q	(Russia) A Morgina	3	2
(Japan) M Hontama	6	6
Q	(New Zealand) E Routliffe	2	0
3	(United States) F Di Lorenzo	6	6
6	(Canada) K Sebov	7	6
(Japan) H Kaji	5	3
(United States) Q Gleason	6	1	3
WC	(Canada) C Zhao	0	6	6
LL	(Canada) L Sleeth	6	4	6
(Japan) N Hanatani	0	6	2
Q	(Canada) A Arseneault	7^{9}	2
2	(Canada) R Marino	6^{7}	0^{r}

Second round
(Japan) Y Tanaka	4	3
(Australia) L Cabrera	6	6
(Japan) M Hontama	1	3
3	(United States) F Di Lorenzo	6	6
6	(Canada) K Sebov	6	6
WC	(Canada) C Zhao	0	2
LL	(Canada) L Sleeth	6	6^{4}	6
Q	(Canada) A Arseneault	3	7^{7}	0

Quarterfinals
(Australia) L Cabrera	7^{7}	6
3	(United States) F Di Lorenzo	6^{4}	3
6	(Canada) K Sebov	6	6
LL	(Canada) L Sleeth	2	1

Semifinals
(Australia) L Cabrera	3	6	6
6	(Canada) K Sebov	6	1	0
