= 2019 Fukuoka International Women's Cup =

- Date: 6–12 May 2019
- Edition: 19th
- Category: ITF Women's World Tennis Tour
- Prize money: $60,000
- Surface: Carpet
- Location: Fukuoka, Japan

Champions

Singles
- (United Kingdom) Heather Watson

Doubles
- (United Kingdom) Naomi Broady / (United Kingdom) Heather Watson
← 2018 ·	Fukuoka International Women's Cup	· 2023 →

The 2019 Fukuoka International Women's Cup was a professional tennis tournament played on outdoor carpet courts. It was the nineteenth edition of the tournament which was part of the 2019 ITF Women's World Tennis Tour. It took place in Fukuoka, Japan between 6 and 12 May 2019.

== Singles main-draw entrants ==
=== Seeds ===
Country	Player	Rank^{1}	Seed
KAZ	Zarina Diyas	115	1
GBR	Heather Watson	117	2
JPN	Ayano Shimizu	186	3
USA	Kristie Ahn	189	4
TPE	Liang En-shuo	190	5
CAN	Rebecca Marino	201	6
JPN	Momoko Kobori	227	7
USA	Jamie Loeb	228	8

- ^{1} Rankings are as of 29 April 2019.

=== Other entrants ===
The following players received wildcards into the singles main draw:

- (Japan) Mana Ayukawa
- (Japan) Kanako Morisaki
- (Japan) Yuki Naito
- (Japan) Moyuka Uchijima

The following players received entry from the qualifying draw:

- (Japan) Shiho Akita
- (United States) Emina Bektas
- (Japan) Mai Hontama
- (Switzerland) Leonie Küng
- (Japan) Himeno Sakatsume
- (United States) Ena Shibahara

== Champions ==
=== Singles ===
- (United Kingdom) Heather Watson def. (Kazakhstan) Zarina Diyas, 7–6^{(7–1)}, 7–6^{(7–4)}

=== Doubles ===
- (United Kingdom) Naomi Broady / (United Kingdom) Heather Watson def. (United States) Kristie Ahn / (Australia) Alison Bai, walkover
