= 2017 Challenger Banque Nationale de Granby – Women's doubles =

Women's doubles
- 2017 Challenger Banque Nationale de Granby

Final
- Champion: (Australia) Ellen Perez (Canada) Carol Zhao
- Runner-up: (Chile) Alexa Guarachi (Australia) Olivia Tjandramulia
- Score: 6–2, 6–2

Events
Singles	men	women
Doubles	men	women
- Challenger de Granby

Jamie Loeb and An-Sophie Mestach were the defending champions, but Loeb chose to participate in Sacramento instead. Mestach partnered Cristiana Ferrando, but they withdrew before their quarterfinal match.

Ellen Perez and Carol Zhao won the title, defeating Alexa Guarachi and Olivia Tjandramulia in the final, 6–2, 6–2.

== Seeds ==
1. (Japan) Hiroko Kuwata / (Russia) Valeria Savinykh (quarterfinals)
2. (Australia) Priscilla Hon / (Hungary) Fanny Stollár (first round)
3. (Japan) Erika Sema / (United Kingdom) Emily Webley-Smith (quarterfinals)
4. (Italy) Cristiana Ferrando / (Belgium) An-Sophie Mestach (quarterfinals, withdrew)

== Draw ==
Key

- Q = Qualifier
- WC = Wild card
- LL = Lucky loser
- Alt = Alternate
- ITF = ITF entry
- PR = Protected ranking
- SR = Special ranking
- SE = Special exempt
- JE = Junior exempt
- JR = Junior Accelerator Programme entrant
- CO = College Accelerator Programme entrant
- NG = Next Gen Accelerator Program entrant
- w/o = Walkover
- r = Retired
- d = Defaulted

First round
1	(Japan) H Kuwata (Russia) V Savinykh	7^{7}	3	[10]
(France) C Paquet (France) S Reix	6^{1}	6	[5]
(Chile) A Guarachi (Australia) O Tjandramulia	6	6
(United States) J Failla (Canada) P Januskova	4	2
4	(Italy) C Ferrando (Belgium) A-S Mestach	7^{7}	5	[10]
(United States) C Van Nguyen (United States) R Yurovsky	6^{4}	7	[4]
Alt	(United States) N Coopersmith (Canada) M Patrascu
(Japan) M Hibi (Japan) M Minokoshi	w/o
WC	(Canada) A Craciun (Canada) I Milosevic	4	0
(Australia) E Perez (Canada) C Zhao	6	6
(Australia) K Birrell (Canada) C Robillard-Millette	5	1
3	(Japan) E Sema (United Kingdom) E Webley-Smith	7	6
(Russia) E Bovina (United Kingdom) S Murray	6	2	[6]
(United Kingdom) K Dunne (Australia) T Patterson	3	6	[10]
(Canada) B Andreescu (Canada) C Branstine	6	6
2	(Australia) P Hon (Hungary) F Stollár	3	3

Quarterfinals
1	(Japan) H Kuwata (Russia) V Savinykh	6	1	[3]
(Chile) A Guarachi (Australia) O Tjandramulia	4	6	[10]
4	(Italy) C Ferrando (Belgium) A-S Mestach
(Japan) M Hibi (Japan) M Minokoshi	w/o
(Australia) E Perez (Canada) C Zhao	6	6
3	(Japan) E Sema (United Kingdom) E Webley-Smith	3	1
(United Kingdom) K Dunne (Australia) T Patterson	2	1
(Canada) B Andreescu (Canada) C Branstine	6	6

Semifinals
(Chile) A Guarachi (Australia) O Tjandramulia	6	6
(Japan) M Hibi (Japan) M Minokoshi	1	4
(Australia) E Perez (Canada) C Zhao	6	7^{7}
(Canada) B Andreescu (Canada) C Branstine	2	6^{4}

Final
(Chile) A Guarachi (Australia) O Tjandramulia	2	2
(Australia) E Perez (Canada) C Zhao	6	6
