= 2018 Challenger Banque Nationale de Granby – Women's doubles =

Women's doubles
- 2018 Challenger Banque Nationale de Granby

Final
- Champions: (Australia) Ellen Perez (Australia) Arina Rodionova
- Runners-up: (Japan) Erika Sema (Japan) Aiko Yoshitomi
- Score: 7–5, 6–4

Events
Singles	men	women
Doubles	men	women
- Challenger de Granby

Ellen Perez and Carol Zhao were the defending champions, but Zhao chose not to participate.

Perez partnered alongside Arina Rodionova and successfully defended her title, beating Erika Sema and Aiko Yoshitomi in the final, 7–5, 6–4.

== Seeds ==
1. (Australia) Ellen Perez / (Australia) Arina Rodionova (champions)
2. (Mexico) Victoria Rodríguez / (New Zealand) Erin Routliffe (withdrew)
3. (France) Manon Arcangioli / (Australia) Olivia Tjandramulia (withdrew)
4. (United Kingdom) Samantha Murray / (Japan) Akiko Omae (semifinals)

== Draw ==
Key

- Q = Qualifier
- WC = Wild card
- LL = Lucky loser
- Alt = Alternate
- ITF = ITF entry
- PR = Protected ranking
- SR = Special ranking
- SE = Special exempt
- JE = Junior exempt
- JR = Junior Accelerator Programme entrant
- CO = College Accelerator Programme entrant
- NG = Next Gen Accelerator Program entrant
- w/o = Walkover
- r = Retired
- d = Defaulted

=== Draw ===
First round
1	(Australia) E Perez (Australia) Ar Rodionova	6	6
WC	(Canada) A Arseneault (Canada) J Bui	2	0
WC	(Canada) LA Fernandez (Canada) R Marino	4	6	[12]
(Chinese Taipei) C-y Hsu (Mexico) M Zacarías	6	3	[10]
3	(France) M Arcangioli (Australia) O Tjandramulia
(Czech Republic) M Bouzková (Canada) C Branstine	w/o
(Slovenia) N Kolar (United States) A Riley	3	3
(Italy) G Brescia (Italy) C Ferrando	6	6
(United States) S Carrington (United States) E Siska	2	2
(United States) Q Gleason (Australia) A Sharma	6	6
WC	(Canada) C Leduc (Canada) L Sleeth	2	2
4	(United Kingdom) S Murray (Japan) A Omae	6	6
(Japan) E Sema (Japan) A Yoshitomi	6^{5}	6	[10]
(Japan) H Arakawa (Japan) N Hanatani	7^{7}	3	[5]
(United States) J Elie (United States) J Robinson	6	6
Alt	(Canada) I Boulais (United States) J Failla	1	3

Quarterfinals
1	(Australia) E Perez (Australia) Ar Rodionova	6	6
WC	(Canada) LA Fernandez (Canada) R Marino	3	3
(Czech Republic) M Bouzková (Canada) C Branstine	w/o
(Italy) G Brescia (Italy) C Ferrando
(United States) Q Gleason (Australia) A Sharma	3	3
4	(United Kingdom) S Murray (Japan) A Omae	6	6
(Japan) E Sema (Japan) A Yoshitomi	7^{7}	6
(United States) J Elie (United States) J Robinson	6^{5}	2

Semifinals
1	(Australia) E Perez (Australia) Ar Rodionova	6	6
(Czech Republic) M Bouzková (Canada) C Branstine	1	3
4	(United Kingdom) S Murray (Japan) A Omae	1	4
(Japan) E Sema (Japan) A Yoshitomi	6	6

Final
1	(Australia) E Perez (Australia) Ar Rodionova	7	6
(Japan) E Sema (Japan) A Yoshitomi	5	4
