= 2024 Fukuoka International Women's Cup =

Tennis tournament

- Date: 6–12 May 2024
- Edition: 21st
- Category: ITF Women's World Tennis Tour
- Prize money: $60,000
- Surface: Carpet / Outdoor
- Location: Fukuoka, Japan

Champions

Singles
- (Australia) Kimberly Birrell

Doubles
- (India) Rutuja Bhosale / (New Zealand) Paige Hourigan
- Fukuoka International Women's Cup

The 2024 Fukuoka International Women's Cup was a professional tennis tournament played on outdoor carpet courts. It was the twenty-first edition of the tournament, which was part of the 2024 ITF Women's World Tennis Tour. It took place in Fukuoka, Japan, between 6 and 12 May 2024.

== Champions ==
=== Singles ===
- (Australia) Kimberly Birrell def. (United States) Emina Bektas, 6–2, 6–4

=== Doubles ===
- (India) Rutuja Bhosale / (New Zealand) Paige Hourigan def. (Japan) Haruna Arakawa / (Japan) Aoi Ito, 3–6, 6–3, [10–6]

== Singles main draw entrants ==
=== Seeds ===
Country	Player	Rank	Seed
AUS	Arina Rodionova	104	1
USA	Emina Bektas	108	2
AUS	Kimberly Birrell	174	3
CHN	Ma Yexin	198	4
THA	Mananchaya Sawangkaew	223	5
CAN	Carol Zhao	233	6
CAN	Stacey Fung	255	7
KOR	Jang Su-jeong	268	8

- Rankings are as of 22 April 2024.

=== Other entrants ===
The following players received wildcards into the singles main draw:

- (Japan) Saki Imamura
- (Japan) Natsumi Kawaguchi
- (Japan) Chika Miyahara
- (Japan) Sera Nishimoto

The following player received entry into the singles main draw using a special ranking:

- (Kazakhstan) Zarina Diyas

The following players received entry from the qualifying draw:

- (Japan) Haruna Arakawa
- (United Kingdom) Sarah Beth Grey
- (Australia) Petra Hule
- (South Korea) Kim Da-bin
- (Japan) Miho Kuramochi
- (Japan) Lisa-Marie Rioux
- (Japan) Eri Shimizu
- (Japan) Mei Yamaguchi
