= 2024 Fukuoka International Women's Cup – Doubles =

Doubles
- 2024 Fukuoka International Women's Cup

Final
- Champions: (India) Rutuja Bhosale (New Zealand) Paige Hourigan
- Runners-up: (Japan) Haruna Arakawa (Japan) Aoi Ito
- Score: 3–6, 6–3, [10–6]

Events
Singles	Doubles
← 2023 ·	Fukuoka International Women's Cup	· 2025 →

Emina Bektas and Lina Glushko were the defending champions but chose not to participate.

Rutuja Bhosale and Paige Hourigan won the title, defeating Haruna Arakawa and Aoi Ito in the final, 3–6, 6–3, [10–6].

== Seeds ==
1. (United Kingdom) Madeleine Brooks / (United Kingdom) Sarah Beth Grey (first round)
2. (Japan) Momoko Kobori / (Japan) Ayano Shimizu (quarterfinals)
3. (Japan) Natsumi Kawaguchi / (Japan) Kanako Morisaki (quarterfinals)
4. (Japan) Haruna Arakawa / (Japan) Aoi Ito (final)

== Draw ==
=== Key ===
- Q = Qualifier
- WC = Wild card
- LL = Lucky loser
- Alt = Alternate
- SE = Special exempt
- PR = Protected ranking
- ITF = ITF entry
- JE = Junior exempt
- w/o = Walkover
- r = Retired
- d = Defaulted
- SR = Special ranking

First round
1	(United Kingdom) M Brooks (United Kingdom) SB Grey	6^{3}	4
(Chinese Taipei) Y-c Hsieh (Japan) Y Saigo	7^{7}	6
(Australia) L Cabrera (United States) D Hewitt	4	2
(Japan) H Abe (Japan) S Imamura	6	6
4	(Japan) H Arakawa (Japan) A Ito	6	6
WC	(Japan) N Imamura (Japan) S Nishimoto	1	0
(Australia) P Hule; P Iatcenko	6	6
WC	(South Korea) A-y Seo (Japan) H Takeuchi	0	0
(India) R Bhosale (New Zealand) P Hourigan	6	6
(Thailand) M Sawangkaew (Japan) E Shimizu	4	3
(Japan) M Kuramochi (Australia) A Osborne	0	4
3	(Japan) N Kawaguchi (Japan) K Morisaki	6	6
WC	(Japan) A Ide (Japan) Y Mizuguchi	3	3
(Japan) Y Naito (Japan) N Sato	6	6
(Japan) E Sema (Japan) M Yamaguchi	2	2
2	(Japan) M Kobori (Japan) A Shimizu	6	6

Quarterfinals
(Chinese Taipei) Y-c Hsieh (Japan) Y Saigo	4	7	[4]
(Japan) H Abe (Japan) S Imamura	6	5	[10]
4	(Japan) H Arakawa (Japan) A Ito	6	3	[10]
(Australia) P Hule; P Iatcenko	4	6	[8]
(India) R Bhosale (New Zealand) P Hourigan	7	3	[10]
3	(Japan) N Kawaguchi (Japan) K Morisaki	5	6	[7]
(Japan) Y Naito (Japan) N Sato	6	6
2	(Japan) M Kobori (Japan) A Shimizu	4	2

Semifinals
(Japan) H Abe (Japan) S Imamura	6	0	[8]
4	(Japan) H Arakawa (Japan) A Ito	4	6	[10]
(India) R Bhosale (New Zealand) P Hourigan	6	6
(Japan) Y Naito (Japan) N Sato	4	3

Final
4	(Japan) H Arakawa (Japan) A Ito	6	3	[6]
(India) R Bhosale (New Zealand) P Hourigan	3	6	[10]
