= 2017 Challenger Banque Nationale de Granby – Men's singles =

Men's singles
- 2017 Challenger Banque Nationale de Granby

Final
- Champion: (Slovenia) Blaž Kavčič
- Runner-up: (Canada) Peter Polansky
- Score: 6–3, 2–6, 7–5

Events
Singles	men	women
Doubles	men	women
- Challenger de Granby

Frances Tiafoe was the defending champion but chose not to defend his title.

Blaž Kavčič won the title after defeating Peter Polansky 6–3, 2–6, 7–5 in the final.

== Seeds ==
1. (Slovenia) Blaž Kavčič (champion)
2. (Canada) Peter Polansky (final)
3. (Japan) Go Soeda (second round)
4. (Canada) Denis Shapovalov (semifinals)
5. (Chinese Taipei) Jason Jung (first round)
6. (France) Vincent Millot (first round)
7. (Japan) Tatsuma Ito (quarterfinals)
8. (Japan) Yasutaka Uchiyama (quarterfinals)

== Draw ==
Key

- Q = Qualifier
- WC = Wild card
- LL = Lucky loser
- Alt = Alternate
- ITF = ITF entry
- PR = Protected ranking
- SR = Special ranking
- SE = Special exempt
- JE = Junior exempt
- JR = Junior Accelerator Programme entrant
- CO = College Accelerator Programme entrant
- NG = Next Gen Accelerator Program entrant
- w/o = Walkover
- r = Retired
- d = Defaulted

=== Finals ===
Semifinals
1	(Slovenia) Blaž Kavčič	6	6
(Canada) Brayden Schnur	2	2
4	(Canada) Denis Shapovalov	2	5
2	(Canada) Peter Polansky	6	7

Final
1	(Slovenia) Blaž Kavčič	6	2	7
2	(Canada) Peter Polansky	3	6	5

=== Top half ===
First round
1	(Slovenia) B Kavčič	6	5	6
(United States) S Bangoura	4	7	3
(Australia) M Polmans	2	4
Q	(United Kingdom) L Broady	6	6
Q	(Japan) K Uchida	6	4	4
(Canada) S Diez	3	6	6
WC	(Canada) B Sigouin	6^{6}	6^{4}
7	(Japan) T Ito	7^{8}	7^{7}
3	(Japan) G Soeda	3	6	7^{7}
(South Africa) L Harris	6	2	6^{5}
(Canada) B Schnur	6	6
(Japan) Y Takahashi	1	2
(Japan) H Moriya	4	7	4
(Australia) M Purcell	6	5	6
Q	(Australia) B Mousley	7^{7}	6
6	(France) V Millot	6^{4}	3

Second round
1	(Slovenia) B Kavčič	6	7
Q	(United Kingdom) L Broady	4	5
(Canada) S Diez	5	4
7	(Japan) T Ito	7	6
3	(Japan) G Soeda	4	7^{7}	5
(Canada) B Schnur	6	6^{5}	7
(Australia) M Purcell	6	6
Q	(Australia) B Mousley	2	4

Quarterfinals
1	(Slovenia) B Kavčič	6	7^{7}
7	(Japan) T Ito	1	6^{5}
(Canada) B Schnur	7^{8}	4	6
(Australia) M Purcell	6^{6}	6	3

Semifinals
1	(Slovenia) B Kavčič	6	6
(Canada) B Schnur	2	2

=== Bottom half ===
First round
5	(Chinese Taipei) J Jung	2	2
(United States) M McDonald	6	6
(United States) A Sarkissian	7^{7}	2	0^{r}
WC	(Canada) Samuel Monette	6^{4}	6	1
(Ecuador) R Quiroz	7^{7}	3	1
(India) Y Bhambri	6^{4}	6	6
Q	(Australia) M Matosevic	5	3
4	(Canada) D Shapovalov	7	6
8	(Japan) Y Uchiyama	6	6
WC	(Canada) P Bester	4	4
(Chinese Taipei) T Chen	7	6
Alt	(Denmark) M Torpegaard	5	3
PR	(Colombia) A González	7	6
(Canada) F Peliwo	5	3
WC	(Canada) F Dancevic	6^{4}	6^{9}
2	(Canada) P Polansky	7^{7}	7^{11}

Second round
(United States) M McDonald	6	6
WC	(Canada) S Monette	1	1
(India) Y Bhambri	6	0	3
4	(Canada) D Shapovalov	4	6	6
8	(Japan) Y Uchiyama	6	6
(Chinese Taipei) T Chen	4	4
PR	(Colombia) A González	4	6	0
2	(Canada) P Polansky	6	3	6

Quarterfinals
(United States) M McDonald	3	6	3
4	(Canada) D Shapovalov	6	4	6
8	(Japan) Y Uchiyama	3	4
2	(Canada) P Polansky	6	6

Semifinals
4	(Canada) D Shapovalov	2	5
2	(Canada) P Polansky	6	7
