= 2018 Fukuoka International Women's Cup =

- Date: 7–13 May
- Edition: 18th
- Category: ITF Women's Circuit
- Prize money: $60,000
- Surface: Carpet
- Location: Fukuoka, Japan

Champions

Singles
- (United Kingdom) Katie Boulter

Doubles
- (United Kingdom) Naomi Broady / (United States) Asia Muhammad
← 2017 ·	Fukuoka International Women's Cup	· 2019 →

The 2018 Fukuoka International Women's Cup was a professional tennis tournament played on outdoor carpet courts. It was the eighteenth edition of the tournament and was part of the 2018 ITF Women's Circuit. It took place in Fukuoka, Japan, on 7–13 May 2018.

== Singles main draw entrants ==
=== Seeds ===
Country	Player	Rank^{1}	Seed
GBR	Naomi Broady	128	1
AUS	Arina Rodionova	138	2
KOR	Jang Su-jeong	172	3
GBR	Gabriella Taylor	173	4
GBR	Katie Boulter	174	5
~~JPN~~	~~Miharu Imanishi~~	~~197~~	~~6~~
JPN	Junri Namigata	206	7
GBR	Laura Robson	222	8

- ^{1} Rankings as of 30 April 2018.

=== Other entrants ===
The following players received a wildcard into the singles main draw:

- (Japan) Misa Eguchi
- (Japan) Yuki Naito
- (Japan) Naho Sato
- (Japan) Mei Yamaguchi

The following players received entry from the qualifying draw:

- (Japan) Rika Fujiwara
- (Japan) ~~Mina Miyahara~~
- (United Kingdom) Tara Moore
- (Australia) Olivia Tjandramulia

The following player received entry as a lucky loser:

- (Japan) Nagi Hanatani
- (Japan) Erina Hayashi
- (Japan) Aiko Yoshitomi

== Champions ==
=== Singles ===
- (United Kingdom) Katie Boulter def. (Russia) Ksenia Lykina, 5–7, 6–4, 6–2

=== Doubles ===
- (United Kingdom) Naomi Broady / (United States) Asia Muhammad def. (United Kingdom) Tara Moore / (Switzerland) Amra Sadiković, 6–2, 6–0
