= 2019 Challenger Banque Nationale de Granby – Women's doubles =

Women's doubles
- 2019 Challenger Banque Nationale de Granby

Final
- Champions: (Japan) Haruka Kaji (Japan) Junri Namigata
- Runners-up: (United States) Quinn Gleason (United States) Ingrid Neel
- Score: 7–6^{(7–5)}, 5–7, [10–8]

Events
Singles	men	women
Doubles	men	women
- Challenger de Granby

Ellen Perez and Arina Rodionova were the defending champions, but chose not to participate.

Haruka Kaji and Junri Namigata won the title, defeating Quinn Gleason and Ingrid Neel in the final, 7–6^{(7–5)}, 5–7, [10–8].

== Seeds ==
1. (United States) Quinn Gleason / (United States) Ingrid Neel (final)
2. (Japan) Haruka Kaji / (Japan) Junri Namigata (champions)
3. (United States) Sachia Vickery / (United Kingdom) Emily Webley-Smith (first round)
4. (United States) Elizabeth Halbauer / (New Zealand) Erin Routliffe (quarterfinals)

== Draw ==
Key

- Q = Qualifier
- WC = Wild card
- LL = Lucky loser
- Alt = Alternate
- ITF = ITF entry
- PR = Protected ranking
- SR = Special ranking
- SE = Special exempt
- JE = Junior exempt
- JR = Junior Accelerator Programme entrant
- CO = College Accelerator Programme entrant
- NG = Next Gen Accelerator Program entrant
- w/o = Walkover
- r = Retired
- d = Defaulted

=== Draw ===
First round
(Japan) N Hanatani (Australia) O Tjandramulia	6	6
(Canada) A Craciun (Canada) M Patrascu	2	0
4	(United States) E Halbauer (New Zealand) E Routliffe	6	6
(Japan) A Inoue (Japan) M Kobori	2	0
(Canada) M Kupres (Canada) A Xu	2	3
(Canada) A Arseneault (Canada) LA Fernandez	6	6
(Canada) L Kwong (Canada) C Leduc	2	6^{4}
(United States) J Ho (Russia) A Morgina	6	7^{7}
(Japan) M Hontama (Japan) M Yonehara	6	7^{7}
3	(United States) S Vickery (United Kingdom) E Webley-Smith	0	6^{4}
(Canada) P Januskova (Canada) L Sleeth	7	0	[2]
(United States) H Abdelouahid (United States) H Giavara	5	6	[10]

Quarterfinals
1	(United States) Q Gleason (United States) I Neel	6	6
(Japan) N Hanatani (Australia) O Tjandramulia	1	3
4	(United States) E Halbauer (New Zealand) E Routliffe	4	6	[7]
(Canada) A Arseneault (Canada) LA Fernandez	6	4	[10]
(United States) J Ho (Russia) A Morgina	6	6
(Japan) M Hontama (Japan) M Yonehara	4	3
(United States) H Abdelouahid (United States) H Giavara	3	1
2	(Japan) H Kaji (Japan) J Namigata	6	6

Semifinals
1	(United States) Q Gleason (United States) I Neel	6	4	[10]
(Canada) A Arseneault (Canada) LA Fernandez	4	6	[6]
(United States) J Ho (Russia) A Morgina	6	3	[5]
2	(Japan) H Kaji (Japan) J Namigata	4	6	[10]

Final
1	(United States) Q Gleason (United States) I Neel	6^{5}	7	[8]
2	(Japan) H Kaji (Japan) J Namigata	7^{7}	5	[10]
