= 2023 Fukuoka International Women's Cup =

Tennis tournament

- Date: 8–14 May 2023
- Edition: 20th
- Category: ITF Women's World Tennis Tour
- Prize money: $60,000
- Surface: Carpet / Outdoor
- Location: Fukuoka, Japan

Champions

Singles
- (Japan) Natsumi Kawaguchi

Doubles
- (United States) Emina Bektas / (Israel) Lina Glushko
- Fukuoka International Women's Cup

The 2023 Fukuoka International Women's Cup was a professional tennis tournament played on outdoor carpet courts. It was the twentieth edition of the tournament, which was part of the 2023 ITF Women's World Tennis Tour. It took place in Fukuoka, Japan, between 8 and 14 May 2023.

== Champions ==
=== Singles ===
- (Japan) Natsumi Kawaguchi def. (United Kingdom) Katie Boulter, walkover

=== Doubles ===
- (United States) Emina Bektas / (Israel) Lina Glushko def. (China) Ma Yexin / (Australia) Alana Parnaby, 7–5, 6–3

== Singles main draw entrants ==
=== Seeds ===
Country	Player	Rank	Seed
GBR	Katie Boulter	154	1
CAN	Carol Zhao	176	2
JPN	Sakura Hosogi	216	3
USA	Emina Bektas	246	4
AUS	Lizette Cabrera	258	5
ISR	Lina Glushko	274	6
JPN	Haruka Kaji	283	7
TPE	Liang En-shuo	307	8

- Rankings are as of 1 May 2023.

=== Other entrants ===
The following players received wildcards into the singles main draw:

- (Japan) Rinko Matsuda
- (Japan) Anri Nagata
- (Japan) Lisa-Marie Rioux
- (Japan) Ai Yamaguchi

The following player received entry into the singles main draw using a special ranking:

- (Japan) Ayano Shimizu

The following players received entry from the qualifying draw:

- (Japan) Yuka Hosoki
- (Japan) Aoi Ito
- (Japan) Natsumi Kawaguchi
- (United States) Tori Kinard
- (Japan) Junri Namigata
- (Japan) Michika Ozeki
- (Japan) Sara Saito
- (Japan) Mei Yamaguchi
