= 2018 Fukuoka International Women's Cup – Doubles =

Doubles
- 2018 Fukuoka International Women's Cup

Final
- Champions: (United Kingdom) Naomi Broady (United States) Asia Muhammad
- Runners-up: (United Kingdom) Tara Moore (Switzerland) Amra Sadiković
- Score: 6–2, 6–0

Events
Singles	Doubles
- Fukuoka International Women's Cup

Junri Namigata and Kotomi Takahata were the defending champions, but both players chose to participate with different partners. Namigata partnered Arina Rodionova, while Takahata played alongside Megumi Nishimoto. Takahata and Nishimoto beat Namigata and Rodionova in the first round, however they lost to Tara Moore and Amra Sadiković in the quarterfinals.

Naomi Broady and Asia Muhammad won the title after defeating Moore and Sadiković 6–2, 6–0 in the final.

== Seeds ==
1. (United States) Jacqueline Cako / (United Kingdom) Laura Robson (quarterfinals)
2. (United Kingdom) Naomi Broady / (United States) Asia Muhammad (champions)
3. (Japan) Junri Namigata / (Australia) Arina Rodionova (first round)
4. (Japan) Rika Fujiwara / (Russia) Ksenia Lykina (quarterfinals)

== Draw ==
Key

- Q = Qualifier
- WC = Wild card
- LL = Lucky loser
- Alt = Alternate
- ITF = ITF entry
- PR = Protected ranking
- SR = Special ranking
- SE = Special exempt
- JE = Junior exempt
- JR = Junior Accelerator Programme entrant
- CO = College Accelerator Programme entrant
- NG = Next Gen Accelerator Program entrant
- w/o = Walkover
- r = Retired
- d = Defaulted

=== Draw ===
First round
1	(United States) J Cako (United Kingdom) L Robson	6	6
Q	(United States) YK Chiang (Japan) N Hanatani	1	1
(Japan) M Kobori (Japan) H Kuwata	3	4
Q	(Japan) H Kaji (Japan) A Shimizu	6	6
3	(Japan) J Namigata (Australia) Ar Rodionova	2	6^{2}
(Japan) M Nishimoto (Japan) K Takahata	6	7^{7}
(United Kingdom) T Moore (Switzerland) A Sadiković	6	6
WC	(Japan) H Sakamoto (Japan) A Sonoda	3	0
(Japan) M Ozeki (Japan) A Yoshitomi	6	4	[8]
(Japan) A Okuno (Australia) T Patterson	1	6	[10]
LL	(United Kingdom) K Dunne (United Kingdom) G Taylor	3	2
4	(Japan) R Fujiwara (Russia) K Lykina	6	6
WC	(Japan) E Hayashi (Japan) R Kajitani	6	6
WC	(Japan) M Eguchi (Japan) Y Saigo	2	2
(Papua New Guinea) A Tere-Apisah (Australia) O Tjandramulia	4	4
2	(United Kingdom) N Broady (United States) A Muhammad	6	6

Quarterfinals
1	(United States) J Cako (United Kingdom) L Robson	4	6^{5}
Q	(Japan) H Kaji (Japan) A Shimizu	6	7^{7}
(Japan) M Nishimoto (Japan) K Takahata	1	4
(United Kingdom) T Moore (Switzerland) A Sadiković	6	6
(Japan) A Okuno (Australia) T Patterson	4	7^{7}	[12]
4	(Japan) R Fujiwara (Russia) K Lykina	6	6^{2}	[10]
WC	(Japan) E Hayashi (Japan) R Kajitani	1	1
2	(United Kingdom) N Broady (United States) A Muhammad	6	6

Semifinals
Q	(Japan) H Kaji (Japan) A Shimizu	5	6	[11]
(United Kingdom) T Moore (Switzerland) A Sadiković	7	2	[13]
(Japan) A Okuno (Australia) T Patterson	7^{7}	2	[9]
2	(United Kingdom) N Broady (United States) A Muhammad	6^{3}	6	[11]

Final
(United Kingdom) T Moore (Switzerland) A Sadiković	2	0
2	(United Kingdom) N Broady (United States) A Muhammad	6	6
