= 2019 Challenger Banque Nationale de Granby – Men's doubles =

Men's doubles
- 2019 Challenger Banque Nationale de Granby

Final
- Champions: (Sweden) André Göransson (Netherlands) Sem Verbeek
- Runners-up: (China) Li Zhe (Monaco) Hugo Nys
- Score: 6–2, 6–4

Events
Singles	men	women
Doubles	men	women
← 2018 ·	Challenger de Granby	· 2022 →

Alex Lawson and Li Zhe were the defending champions but only Li chose to defend his title, partnering Hugo Nys. Li lost in the final to André Göransson and Sem Verbeek.

Göransson and Verbeek won the title after defeating Li and Nys 6–2, 6–4 in the final.

== Seeds ==
1. (China) Li Zhe / (Monaco) Hugo Nys (final)
2. (United States) Hunter Reese / (Canada) Adil Shamasdin (quarterfinals)
3. (Sweden) André Göransson / (Netherlands) Sem Verbeek (champions)
4. (Mexico) Hans Hach Verdugo / (United States) Dennis Novikov (first round)

== Draw ==
=== Key ===
- Q = Qualifier
- WC = Wild card
- LL = Lucky loser
- Alt = Alternate
- ITF = ITF entry
- PR = Protected ranking
- SR = Special ranking
- SE = Special exempt
- JE = Junior exempt
- JR = Junior Accelerator Programme entrant
- CO = College Accelerator Programme entrant
- NG = Next Gen Accelerator Program entrant
- w/o = Walkover
- r = Retired
- d = Defaulted

First round
1	(China) Z Li (Monaco) H Nys	6	6
WC	(Canada) A Galarneau (Canada) B Sigouin	3	0
ITF	(United Kingdom) E Hoyt (Tunisia) S Mansouri	5	6	[10]
(Croatia) B Gojo (Serbia) D Petrović	7	2	[3]
4	(Mexico) H Hach Verdugo (United States) D Novikov	6^{4}	3
(Australia) A Harris (Australia) A Santillan	7^{7}	6
(Canada) S Diez (Japan) K Uchida	6	7^{7}
ITF	(United States) Jordi Arconada (United States) E Zhu	4	6^{3}
(United States) E Escobedo (Canada) P Polansky	2	4
(United Kingdom) B Klein (Venezuela) R Maytín	6	6
(France) M Janvier (Austria) M Neuchrist	4	4
3	(Sweden) A Göransson (Netherlands) S Verbeek	6	6
WC	(Canada) L Draxl (Canada) Nicaise Muamba	6	6
WC	(Canada) T Baadi (Canada) J Boulais	3	2
(Australia) M Banes (Australia) Jacob Grills	3	3
2	(United States) H Reese (Canada) A Shamasdin	6	6

Quarterfinals
1	(China) Z Li (Monaco) H Nys	6	6
ITF	(United Kingdom) E Hoyt (Tunisia) S Mansouri	4	4
(Australia) A Harris (Australia) A Santillan	6	6
(Canada) S Diez (Japan) K Uchida	4	4
(United Kingdom) B Klein (Venezuela) R Maytín	1	5
3	(Sweden) A Göransson (Netherlands) S Verbeek	6	7
WC	(Canada) L Draxl (Canada) N Muamba	6	5	[10]
2	(United States) H Reese (Canada) A Shamasdin	2	7	[7]

Semifinals
1	(China) Z Li (Monaco) H Nys	6	6
(Australia) A Harris (Australia) A Santillan	3	2
3	(Sweden) A Göransson (Netherlands) S Verbeek	6	6
WC	(Canada) L Draxl (Canada) N Muamba	4	3

Final
1	(China) Z Li (Monaco) H Nys	2	4
3	(Sweden) A Göransson (Netherlands) S Verbeek	6	6
