= 2023 Fukuoka International Women's Cup – Doubles =

Doubles
- 2023 Fukuoka International Women's Cup

Final
- Champions: (United States) Emina Bektas (Israel) Lina Glushko
- Runners-up: (China) Ma Yexin (Australia) Alana Parnaby
- Score: 7–5, 6–3

Events
Singles	Doubles
← 2019 ·	Fukuoka International Women's Cup	· 2024 →

Naomi Broady and Heather Watson were the defending champions but chose not to participate.

Emina Bektas and Lina Glushko won the title, defeating Ma Yexin and Alana Parnaby in the final, 7–5, 6–3.

== Seeds ==
1. (China) Ma Yexin / (Australia) Alana Parnaby (final)
2. (United States) Emina Bektas / (Israel) Lina Glushko (champions)
3. (Japan) Saki Imamura / (Japan) Kanako Morisaki (quarterfinals)
4. (Japan) Funa Kozaki / (Japan) Junri Namigata (semifinals)

== Draw ==
=== Key ===
- Q = Qualifier
- WC = Wild card
- LL = Lucky loser
- Alt = Alternate
- SE = Special exempt
- PR = Protected ranking
- ITF = ITF entry
- JE = Junior exempt
- w/o = Walkover
- r = Retired
- d = Defaulted
- SR = Special ranking

First round
1	(China) Y Ma (Australia) A Parnaby	6	6
(Japan) Y Hosoki (Japan) E Shimizu	4	2
(Japan) A Ito (Japan) Ma Mushika	6	4	[7]
(Poland) O Lincer (Japan) S Saito	1	6	[10]
3	(Japan) S Imamura (Japan) K Morisaki	3	6	[10]
WC	(Japan) A Ide (Japan) Y Mizuguchi	6	0	[1]
(Australia) T Gibson (Japan) A Inoue	6	5	[5]
(Japan) E Hayashi (Japan) N Kawaguchi	4	7	[10]
(Japan) N Hanatani (Japan) N Kawagishi	4	1
(Japan) R Saigo (Japan) Y Saigo	6	6
WC	(Japan) S Ishibashi (Japan) A Kuraoka	5	2
4	(Japan) F Kozaki (Japan) J Namigata	7	6
WC	(Japan) A Ryszawy (Japan) H Takeuchi	2	1
(Japan) N Katsumi (Japan) A Shimizu	6	6
(Japan) M Ozeki (Japan) R Ueda	1	3
2	(United States) E Bektas (Israel) L Glushko	6	6

Quarterfinals
1	(China) Y Ma (Australia) A Parnaby	6	6
(Poland) O Lincer (Japan) S Saito	3	1
3	(Japan) S Imamura (Japan) K Morisaki	3	4
(Japan) E Hayashi (Japan) N Kawaguchi	6	6
(Japan) R Saigo (Japan) Y Saigo	2	7^{7}	[8]
4	(Japan) F Kozaki (Japan) J Namigata	6	6^{4}	[10]
(Japan) N Katsumi (Japan) A Shimizu	3	1
2	(United States) E Bektas (Israel) L Glushko	6	6

Semifinals
1	(China) Y Ma (Australia) A Parnaby	7	6
(Japan) E Hayashi (Japan) N Kawaguchi	5	2
4	(Japan) F Kozaki (Japan) J Namigata	4	4
2	(United States) E Bektas (Israel) L Glushko	6	6

Final
1	(China) Y Ma (Australia) A Parnaby	5	3
2	(United States) E Bektas (Israel) L Glushko	7	6
