= 2017 Challenger Banque Nationale de Granby – Women's singles =

Women's singles
- 2017 Challenger Banque Nationale de Granby

Final
- Champion: (Italy) Cristiana Ferrando
- Runner-up: (Canada) Katherine Sebov
- Score: 6–2, 6–3

Events
Singles	men	women
Doubles	men	women
← 2016 ·	Challenger de Granby	· 2018 →

Jennifer Brady was the defending champion, but she chose to compete in Sacramento instead.

Cristiana Ferrando won the title, defeating Katherine Sebov in the final, 6–2, 6–3.

== Seeds ==
1. (Canada) Bianca Andreescu (second round)
2. (Czech Republic) Marie Bouzková (semifinals, retired)
3. (France) Chloé Paquet (second round)
4. (Australia) Olivia Rogowska (second round)
5. (Hungary) Fanny Stollár (first round)
6. (Israel) Deniz Khazaniuk (first round)
7. (United Kingdom) Katie Boulter (quarterfinals)
8. (Japan) Mayo Hibi (quarterfinals)

== Draw ==
=== Key ===
- Q = Qualifier
- WC = Wild card
- LL = Lucky loser
- Alt = Alternate
- SE = Special exempt
- PR = Protected ranking
- ITF = ITF entry
- JE = Junior exempt
- w/o = Walkover
- r = Retired
- d = Defaulted
- SR = Special ranking

=== Finals ===
Semifinals
(Canada) Katherine Sebov	6	7
Q	(France) Jessika Ponchet	4	5
(Italy) Cristiana Ferrando	6	2
2	(Czech Republic) Marie Bouzková	4	3^{r}

Final
(Canada) Katherine Sebov	2	3
(Italy) Cristiana Ferrando	6	6

=== Top half ===
First round
1	(Canada) B Andreescu	6	6
PR	(Australia) K Birrell	3	2
(Japan) M Minokoshi	4	4
(Canada) K Sebov	6	6
WC	(Canada) C Zhao	4	3
(Australia) T Patterson	6	6
WC	(Australia) E Perez	4	1
8	(Japan) M Hibi	6	6
4	(Australia) O Rogowska	6^{4}	6	6
(United States) R Yurovsky	7^{7}	1	2
(Japan) M Imanishi	3	3
Q	(France) J Ponchet	6	6
WC	(Canada) C Robillard-Millette	4	2
(Canada) A Wozniak	6	6
(Germany) S-R Sekulic	6^{5}	7^{8}	6
5	(Hungary) F Stollár	7^{7}	6^{6}	4

Second round
1	(Canada) B Andreescu	6^{3}	5
(Canada) K Sebov	7^{7}	7
(Australia) T Patterson	6	2	1
8	(Japan) M Hibi	3	6	6
4	(Australia) O Rogowska	3	4
Q	(France) J Ponchet	6	6
(Canada) A Wozniak	0	4
(Germany) S-R Sekulic	6	6

Quarterfinals
(Canada) K Sebov	6^{3}	6	7^{7}
8	(Japan) M Hibi	7^{7}	4	6^{1}
Q	(France) J Ponchet	7^{7}	6
(Germany) S-R Sekulic	6^{4}	3

Semifinals
(Canada) K Sebov	6	7
Q	(France) J Ponchet	4	5

=== Bottom half ===
First round
6	(Israel) D Khazaniuk	6	3	4
Q	(United States) C Van Nguyen	0	6	6
Q	(United States) J Failla	6^{2}	1
(Belgium) A-S Mestach	7^{7}	6
(Italy) C Ferrando	7^{7}	6
WC	(Canada) C Branstine	6^{3}	3
(Russia) V Savinykh	1	6^{5}
3	(France) C Paquet	6	7^{7}
7	(United Kingdom) K Boulter	7	5	7
(France) S Reix	5	7	5
(Japan) H Kuwata	4	7^{7}	4
Q	(Chile) A Guarachi	6	6^{3}	6
LL	(Russia) E Bovina	6^{3}	7^{7}	6
(United Kingdom) K Dunne	7^{7}	6^{5}	1
(Japan) E Sema	3	3
2	(Czech Republic) M Bouzková	6	6

Second round
Q	(United States) C Van Nguyen	1	3
(Belgium) A-S Mestach	6	6
(Italy) C Ferrando	6	6
3	(France) C Paquet	2	4
7	(United Kingdom) K Boulter	6	7^{7}
Q	(Chile) A Guarachi	0	6^{5}
LL	(Russia) E Bovina	6	4	3
2	(Czech Republic) M Bouzková	3	6	6

Quarterfinals
(Belgium) A-S Mestach	2	5
(Italy) C Ferrando	6	7
7	(United Kingdom) K Boulter	5	2
2	(Czech Republic) M Bouzková	7	6

Semifinals
(Italy) C Ferrando	6	2
2	(Czech Republic) M Bouzková	4	3^{r}
