= 2017 Challenger Banque Nationale de Granby – Men's doubles =

Men's doubles
- 2017 Challenger Banque Nationale de Granby

Final
- Champions: (United Kingdom) Joe Salisbury (United States) Jackson Withrow
- Runners-up: (Uruguay) Marcel Felder (Japan) Go Soeda
- Score: 4–6, 6–3, [10–6]

Events
Singles	men	women
Doubles	men	women
- Challenger de Granby

Guilherme Clezar and Alejandro González were the defending champions but only González chose to defend his title, partnering Luis David Martínez. González lost in the first round to Chen Ti and Bradley Mousley.

Joe Salisbury and Jackson Withrow won the title after defeating Marcel Felder and Go Soeda 4–6, 6–3, [10–6] in the final.

== Seeds ==
1. (United Kingdom) Luke Bambridge / (Republic of Ireland) David O'Hare (quarterfinals)
2. (United Kingdom) Joe Salisbury / (United States) Jackson Withrow (champions)
3. (Chinese Taipei) Chen Ti / (Australia) Bradley Mousley (semifinals)
4. (Canada) Philip Bester / (Canada) Peter Polansky (quarterfinals, withdrew)

== Draw ==
Key

- Q = Qualifier
- WC = Wild card
- LL = Lucky loser
- Alt = Alternate
- ITF = ITF entry
- PR = Protected ranking
- SR = Special ranking
- SE = Special exempt
- JE = Junior exempt
- JR = Junior Accelerator Programme entrant
- CO = College Accelerator Programme entrant
- NG = Next Gen Accelerator Program entrant
- w/o = Walkover
- r = Retired
- d = Defaulted

First round
1	(United Kingdom) L Bambridge (Republic of Ireland) D O'Hare	6	6
(United Kingdom) L Broady (Australia) M Purcell	3	3
(Mexico) H Hach Verdugo (Canada) F Peliwo	6^{1}	3
(Uruguay) M Felder (Japan) G Soeda	7^{7}	6
4	(Canada) P Bester (Canada) P Polansky	6	6
WC	(Canada) Washi Gervais (Canada) K Stevenson	3	4
(Canada) S Diez (Japan) H Moriya	6	6
WC	(Canada) A Galarneau (Canada) Samuel Monette	2	4
(South Africa) L Harris (Australia) M Polmans	1	4
(United States) S Bangoura (Philippines) R Gonzales	6	6
(Colombia) A González (Venezuela) LD Martínez	3	2
3	(Chinese Taipei) T Chen (Australia) B Mousley	6	6
(United States) M McDonald (Ecuador) R Quiroz	6^{3}	6	[10]
(Canada) F Dancevic (Canada) B Schnur	7^{7}	2	[8]
WC	(Canada) Nicaise Muamba (Canada) B Sigouin	1	3
2	(United Kingdom) J Salisbury (United States) J Withrow	6	6

Quarterfinals
1	(United Kingdom) L Bambridge (Republic of Ireland) D O'Hare	7	2	[8]
(Uruguay) M Felder (Japan) G Soeda	5	6	[10]
4	(Canada) P Bester (Canada) P Polansky
(Canada) S Diez (Japan) H Moriya	w/o
(United States) S Bangoura (Philippines) R Gonzales	0	3
3	(Chinese Taipei) T Chen (Australia) B Mousley	6	6
(United States) M McDonald (Ecuador) R Quiroz	3	4
2	(United Kingdom) J Salisbury (United States) J Withrow	6	6

Semifinals
(Uruguay) M Felder (Japan) G Soeda	w/o
(Canada) S Diez (Japan) H Moriya
3	(Chinese Taipei) T Chen (Australia) B Mousley	2	2
2	(United Kingdom) J Salisbury (United States) J Withrow	6	6

Final
(Uruguay) M Felder (Japan) G Soeda	6	3	[6]
2	(United Kingdom) J Salisbury (United States) J Withrow	4	6	[10]
