= 2018 Challenger Banque Nationale de Granby – Men's singles =

Men's singles
- 2018 Challenger Banque Nationale de Granby

Final
- Champion: (Canada) Peter Polansky
- Runner-up: (France) Ugo Humbert
- Score: 6–4, 1–6, 6–2

Events
Singles	men	women
Doubles	men	women
- Challenger de Granby

Blaž Kavčič was the defending champion but chose not to defend his title.

Peter Polansky won the title after defeating Ugo Humbert 6–4, 1–6, 6–2 in the final.

== Seeds ==
1. (France) Pierre-Hugues Herbert (second round)
2. (Australia) Jason Kubler (withdrew)
3. (Canada) Peter Polansky (champion)
4. (Germany) Matthias Bachinger (first round)
5. (United Kingdom) Liam Broady (first round)
6. (Slovakia) Norbert Gombos (semifinals)
7. (Canada) Filip Peliwo (second round)
8. (United States) Mitchell Krueger (first round)

== Draw ==
Key

- Q = Qualifier
- WC = Wild card
- LL = Lucky loser
- Alt = Alternate
- ITF = ITF entry
- PR = Protected ranking
- SR = Special ranking
- SE = Special exempt
- JE = Junior exempt
- JR = Junior Accelerator Programme entrant
- CO = College Accelerator Programme entrant
- NG = Next Gen Accelerator Program entrant
- w/o = Walkover
- r = Retired
- d = Defaulted

=== Finals ===
Semifinals
(France) Ugo Humbert	6	4	6
6	(Slovakia) Norbert Gombos	3	6	4
3	(Canada) Peter Polansky	7^{8}	6
(Canada) Frank Dancevic	6^{6}	4

Final
(France) Ugo Humbert	4	6	2
3	(Canada) Peter Polansky	6	1	6

=== Top half ===
First round
1	(France) P-H Herbert	7^{7}	6
(France) V Millot	6^{4}	0
(France) U Humbert	6	6
WC	(Canada) A Galarneau	4	2
(United States) JC Aragone	6	6
WC	(Canada) Samuel Monette	4	4
(Canada) B Schnur	6	6
5	(United Kingdom) L Broady	4	4
4	(Germany) M Bachinger	3	6	2
Q	(Belgium) J De Loore	6	4	6
WC	(Canada) Pavel Krainik	3	3
(Japan) Renta Tokuda	6	6
(Austria) M Neuchrist	4	6	7^{7}
Q	(Australia) D Kelly	6	3	6^{5}
(Japan) K Uchida	1	4
6	(Slovakia) N Gombos	6	6

Second round
1	(France) P-H Herbert	4	4
(France) U Humbert	6	6
(United States) JC Aragone	3	4
(Canada) B Schnur	6	6
Q	(Belgium) J De Loore	6	7
(Japan) R Tokuda	1	5
(Austria) M Neuchrist	4	6^{3}
6	(Slovakia) N Gombos	6	7^{7}

Quarterfinals
(France) U Humbert	5	6	4
(Canada) B Schnur	7	3	1^{r}
Q	(Belgium) J De Loore	4	4
6	(Slovakia) N Gombos	6	6

Semifinals
(France) U Humbert	6	4	6
6	(Slovakia) N Gombos	3	6	4

=== Bottom half ===
First round
8	(United States) M Krueger	6^{3}	3
(Japan) Y Uchiyama	7^{7}	6
LL	(Australia) Jacob Grills	1	6^{5}
(Italy) S Napolitano	6	7^{7}
(China) Z Li	6	6
Q	(Thailand) W Trongcharoenchaikul	2	1
(Japan) Y Takahashi	4	1
3	(Canada) P Polansky	6	6
7	(Canada) F Peliwo	6	6
(Brazil) J Menezes	4	3
(Australia) B Mousley	6	6^{5}	4
(United States) A Sarkissian	3	7^{7}	6
WC	(Canada) B Sigouin	3	6	4
Q	(Austria) L Miedler	6	2	6
(Canada) F Dancevic	6	6
LL	(Zimbabwe) T Garanganga	4	4

Second round
(Japan) Y Uchiyama	4	6^{5}
(Italy) S Napolitano	6	7^{7}
(China) Z Li	4	3
3	(Canada) P Polansky	6	6
7	(Canada) F Peliwo	4	3
(United States) A Sarkissian	6	6
Q	(Austria) L Miedler	4	4
(Canada) F Dancevic	6	6

Quarterfinals
(Italy) S Napolitano	5	6^{2}
3	(Canada) P Polansky	7	7^{7}
(United States) A Sarkissian	6	2	4
(Canada) F Dancevic	1	6	6

Semifinals
3	(Canada) P Polansky	7^{8}	6
(Canada) F Dancevic	6^{6}	4
