= 2018 Challenger Banque Nationale de Granby =

- Date: 23–29 July
- Edition: 25th (ATP); 8th (ITF)
- Category: ATP Challenger Tour; ITF Women's Circuit
- Prize money: $100,000 (ATP) $60,000 (ITF)
- Surface: Hard
- Location: Granby, Canada

Champions

Men's singles
- (Canada) Peter Polansky

Women's singles
- (Israel) Julia Glushko

Men's doubles
- (United States) Alex Lawson / (China) Li Zhe

Women's doubles
- (Australia) Ellen Perez / (Australia) Arina Rodionova
- Challenger de Granby

The 2018 Challenger Banque Nationale de Granby was a professional tennis tournament played on outdoor hard courts. It was the twenty-fifth (ATP) and eighth (ITF) editions of the tournament and was part of the 2018 ATP Challenger Tour and the 2018 ITF Women's Circuit. It took place in Granby, Canada, on 23–29 July 2018.

== Men's singles main draw entrants ==
=== Seeds ===
Country	Player	Rank^{1}	Seed
FRA	Pierre-Hugues Herbert	76	1
~~AUS~~	~~Jason Kubler~~	~~114~~	~~2~~
CAN	Peter Polansky	122	3
GER	Matthias Bachinger	163	4
GBR	Liam Broady	177	5
SVK	Norbert Gombos	181	6
CAN	Filip Peliwo	205	7
USA	Mitchell Krueger	216	8

- ^{1} Rankings are as of 16 July 2018.

=== Other entrants ===
The following players received wildcards into the singles main draw:

- (Canada) Alexis Galarneau
- (Canada) Pavel Krainik
- (Canada) Samuel Monette
- (Canada) Benjamin Sigouin

The following players received entry from the qualifying draw:

- (Belgium) Joris De Loore
- (Australia) Dayne Kelly
- (Austria) Lucas Miedler
- (Thailand) Wishaya Trongcharoenchaikul

The following players received entry as lucky losers:

- (Zimbabwe) Takanyi Garanganga
- (Australia) Jacob Grills

== Women's singles main draw entrants ==
=== Seeds ===
Country	Player	Rank^{1}	Seed
AUS	Arina Rodionova	142	1
CZE	Marie Bouzková	167	2
CAN	Bianca Andreescu	185	3
USA	Francesca Di Lorenzo	196	4
ISR	Julia Glushko	211	5
AUS	Ellen Perez	252	6
USA	Maria Sanchez	271	7
CAN	Katherine Sebov	276	8

- ^{1} Rankings as of 16 July 2018.

=== Other entrants ===
The following players received a wildcard into the singles main draw:

- (Canada) Isabelle Boulais
- (Canada) Jada Bui
- (Canada) Leylah Annie Fernandez
- (Canada) Tiffany Lagarde

The following players received entry from the qualifying draw:

- (United Kingdom) Freya Christie
- (Japan) Nagi Hanatani
- (United Kingdom) Samantha Murray
- (Japan) Akiko Omae

== Champions ==
=== Men's singles ===
- (Canada) Peter Polansky def. (France) Ugo Humbert 6–4, 1–6, 6–2

=== Women's singles ===
- (Israel) Julia Glushko def. (Australia) Arina Rodionova 6–4, 6–3

=== Men's doubles ===
- (United States) Alex Lawson / (China) Li Zhe def. (United States) JC Aragone / (United Kingdom) Liam Broady 7–6^{(7–2)}, 6–3.

=== Women's doubles ===
- (Australia) Ellen Perez / (Australia) Arina Rodionova def. (Japan) Erika Sema / (Japan) Aiko Yoshitomi, 7–5, 6–4
