= Cristiana Ferrando =

Italian tennis player

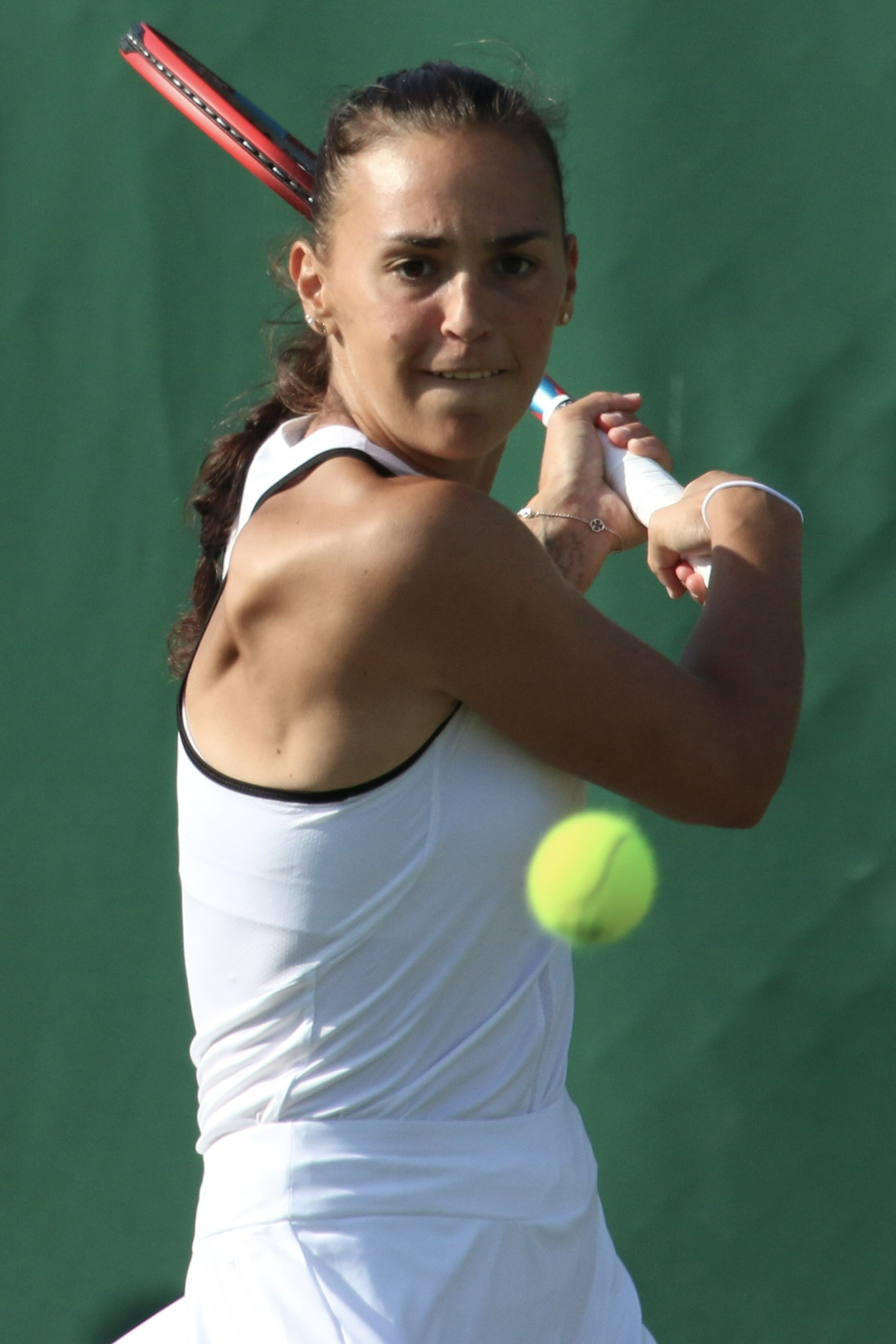
- Ferrando at the 2022 Wimbledon Championships
- Country (sports): Italy
- Born: 10 August 1995 (age 29)
- Plays: Right-handed (two-handed backhand)
- Prize money: US$ 157,711

Singles
- Career record: 271–206
- Career titles: 4 ITF
- Highest ranking: No. 247 (23 May 2022)

Grand Slam singles results
- Wimbledon: Q2 (2022)

Doubles
- Career record: 79–82
- Career titles: 3 ITF
- Highest ranking: No. 302 (2 October 2017)
- Last updated on: 27 June 2024.

Cristiana Ferrando (born 10 August 1995) is an inactive Italian tennis player.

On 23 May 2022, she reached her best singles ranking of world No. 247. On 2 October 2017, she peaked at No. 302 in the doubles rankings. Ferrando has won four singles titles and three doubles titles on the ITF Women's Circuit.

She made her WTA Tour main-draw debut at the 2016 Guangzhou International Open where she received entry by a lucky loser spot, losing in the first round to Nigina Abduraimova.

== Grand Slam performance timeline ==
Key
W	F	SF	QF	#R	RR	Q#	P#	DNQ	A	Z#	PO	G	S	B	NMS	NTI	P	NH

(W) winner; (F) finalist; (SF) semifinalist; (QF) quarterfinalist; (#R) rounds 4, 3, 2, 1; (RR) round-robin stage; (Q#) qualification round; (P#) preliminary round; (DNQ) did not qualify; (A) absent; (Z#) Davis/Fed Cup Zonal Group (with number indication) or (PO) play-off; (G) gold, (S) silver or (B) bronze Olympic/Paralympic medal; (NMS) not a Masters tournament; (NTI) not a Tier I tournament; (P) postponed; (NH) not held; (SR) strike rate (events won / competed); (W–L) win–loss record.
To avoid confusion and double counting, these charts are updated at the conclusion of a tournament or when the player's participation has ended.

=== Singles ===
Tournament	2022	SR	W–L
Australian Open	A	0 / 0	0–0
French Open	A	0 / 0	0–0
Wimbledon	Q2	0 / 0	0–0
US Open	A	0 / 0	0–0
Win–loss	0–0	0 / 0	0–0

== ITF Circuit finals ==
Legend
$60,000 tournaments
$25,000 tournaments
$10/15,000 tournaments

=== Singles: 14 (4 titles, 10 runner–ups) ===
Result	W–L	Date	Tournament	Tier	Surface	Opponent	Score
Loss	0–1	Sep 2014	ITF Pula, Italy	10,000	Clay	(Italy) Martina Trevisan	4–6, 3–6
Win	1–1	Mar 2015	ITF Solarino, Italy	10,000	Hard	(France) Irina Ramialison	6–3, 6–3
Win	2–1	Jun 2015	ITF Cantanhede, Portugal	10,000	Clay	(Netherlands) Kelly Versteeg	6–4, 7–6^{(6)}
Loss	2–2	Jul 2015	ITF Amarante, Portugal	10,000	Hard	(Germany) Julia Wachaczyk	5–7, 4–6
Loss	2–3	Nov 2015	GB Pro-Series Loughborough, UK	15,000	Hard (i)	(Croatia) Jana Fett	2–6, 1–6
Loss	2–4	Apr 2016	ITF Heraklion, Greece	10,000	Hard	(Russia) Victoria Kan	4–6, 5–7
Loss	2–5	Apr 2016	ITF Heraklion, Greece	10,000	Hard	(Romania) Raluca Șerban	3–6, 6–7^{(4)}
Loss	2–6	Aug 2016	ITF Caslano, Switzerland	10,000	Clay	(Italy) Georgia Brescia	4–6, 1–3 ret.
Loss	2–7	Nov 2016	ITF Heraklion, Greece	10,000	Hard	(Russia) Marta Paigina	5–7, 3–6
Win	3–7	Feb 2017	ITF Nanjing, China	15,000	Hard	(China) Guo Hanyu	6–0, 6–2
Win	4–7	Jul 2017	Challenger de Granby, Canada	60,000	Hard	(Canada) Katherine Sebov	6–2, 6–3
Loss	4–8	Mar 2019	ITF Sharm El Sheik, Egypt	15,000	Hard	(Belarus) Anna Kubareva	5–7, 4–6
Loss	4–9	Feb 2022	ITF Mâcon, France	25,000	Hard (i)	(Russia) Vitalia Diatchenko	4–6, 3–6
Loss	4–10	Feb 2023	ITF Monastir, Tunisia	15,000	Hard	(France) Fiona Ferro	4–6, 3–6

=== Doubles: 9 (3 titles, 6 runner–ups) ===
Result	W–L	Date	Tournament	Tier	Surface	Partner	Opponents	Score
Loss	0–1	Jul 2014	ITF Rimini, Italy	10,000	Clay	(Italy) Georgia Brescia	(Germany) Luisa Marie Huber (Poland) Natalia Siedliska	3–6, 4–6
Loss	0–2	Sep 2014	ITF Pula, Italy	10,000	Clay	(Italy) Stefania Rubini	(Italy) Alice Balducci (Italy) Angelica Moratelli	1–6, 4–6
Loss	0–3	Sep 2015	ITF Antalya, Turkey	10,000	Hard	(Switzerland) Chiara Grimm	(Greece) Despina Papamichail (Serbia) Nina Stojanović	6–1, 1–6, [5–10]
Win	1–3	Apr 2016	ITF Heraklion, Greece	10,000	Hard	(Hungary) Dalma Gálfi	(Russia) Kseniia Bekker (Romania) Raluca Șerban	6–4, 5–7, [14–12]
Loss	1–4	Oct 2016	ITF Pula, Italy	25,000	Clay	(Slovakia) Vivien Juhászová	(Italy) Camilla Rosatello (Liechtenstein) Kathinka von Deichmann	1–6, 6–3, [6–10]
Loss	1–5	Nov 2016	ITF Heraklion, Greece	10,000	Hard	(Belgium) Michaela Boev	(Israel) Vlada Ekshibarova (Romania) Raluca Șerban	4–6, 6–7^{(4)}
Loss	1–6	Apr 2017	ITF Pula, Italy	25,000	Clay	(Italy) Camilla Rosatello	(Spain) Georgina García Pérez (United States) Bernarda Pera	4–6, 3–6
Win	2–6	Jun 2017	ITF Padua, Italy	25,000	Clay	(Italy) Alice Matteucci	(Brazil) Gabriela Cé (Argentina) Catalina Pella	2–6, 6–0, [11–9]
Win	3–6	Jun 2021	ITF Jönköping, Sweden	25,000	Clay	(Romania) Oana Georgeta Simion	(Sweden) Jacqueline Cabaj Awad (France) Carole Monnet	7–5, 6–4
