= Haruka Kaji =

Japanese tennis player (born 1994)

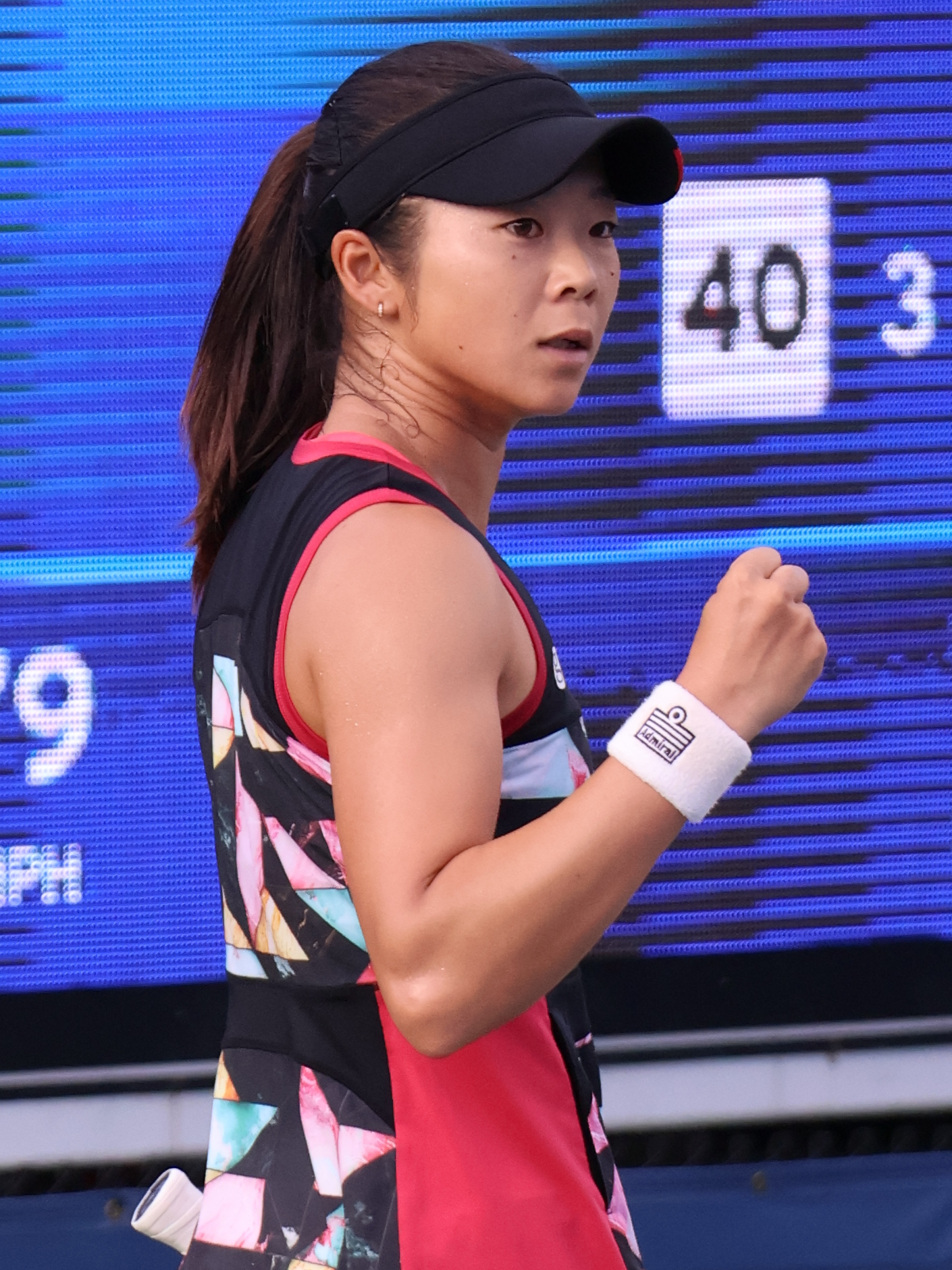
- Kaji at the 2023 US Open
- Country (sports): Japan
- Born: 25 September 1994 (age 32) Tsuyama, Okayama, Japan
- Plays: Right (two-handed backhand)
- Prize money: $264,164

Singles
- Career record: 338–280
- Career titles: 7 ITF
- Highest ranking: No. 213 (25 September 2023)
- Current ranking: No. 292 (9 November 2026)

Grand Slam singles results
- French Open: Q1 (2025)
- US Open: Q2 (2023)

Doubles
- Career record: 88–71
- Career titles: 6 ITF
- Highest ranking: No. 131 (3 February 2020)
- Current ranking: No. 1,284 (9 November 2026)
Medal record
Women's tennis
Representing Japan
Asian Games
Bronze medal – third place	2022 Hangzhou	Singles
- Last updated on: 13 November 2026.

Haruka Kaji (加治 遥, Kaji Haruka; born 25 September 1994) is a Japanese professional tennis player. She has career-high WTA rankings of 213 in singles, achieved on 25 September 2023, and No. 131 in doubles, set on 3 February 2020.

== Career ==
Kaji won her biggest ITF title to date at the 2019 Challenger de Granby, in the doubles tournament, partnering Ingrid Neel.

== ITF Circuit finals ==
=== Singles: 15 (7 titles, 8 runner-ups) ===
Legend W50 tournaments W25/35 tournaments W10/15 tournaments	Finals by surface Hard (5–7) Grass (0–1) Carpet (2–0)

Result	W–L	Date	Tournament	Tier	Surface	Opponent	Score
Win	1–0	Dec 2015	ITF Hong Kong, China	10k	Hard	(United States) Tori Kinard	6–1, 3–6, 2–2 ret.
Loss	1–1	Oct 2016	ITF Tarakan, Indonesia	10k	Hard (i)	(United States) Kaitlyn Christian	7–5, 3–6, 2–6
Win	2–1	Jun 2017	Kofu Women's Cup, Japan	25k	Hard	(Australia) Olivia Tjandramulia	6–1, 6–3
Loss	2–2	Jun 2017	ITF Taipei, Taiwan	15k	Hard	(Chinese Taipei) Lee Pei-chi	6–3, 5–7, 2–6
Win	3–2	Aug 2017	ITF Nonthaburi, Thailand	15k	Hard	(Chinese Taipei) Lee Hua-chen	6–4, 6–1
Win	4–2	Dec 2017	ITF Hong Kong	15k	Hard	(Japan) Hiroko Kuwata	4–6, 6–2, 7–6^{(4)}
Loss	4–3	Aug 2019	ITF Tsukuba, Japan	W25	Hard (i)	(Japan) Akiko Omae	6–3, 6–7^{(5)}, 3–6
Loss	4–4	Sep 2019	ITF Kyoto, Japan	W25	Hard (i)	(Chinese Taipei) Lee Ya-hsuan	3–6, 4–6
Win	5–4	Oct 2022	Noto International, Japan	W25	Carpet	(Japan) Momoko Kobori	3–6, 6–3, 6–3
Win	6–4	Oct 2022	ITF Hamamatsu, Japan	W25	Carpet	(Japan) Ikumi Yamazaki	1–1 ret.
Loss	6–5	May 2023	ITF Karuizawa, Japan	W25	Grass	(China) Wang Yafan	0–6, 1–6
Loss	6–6	Aug 2024	ITF Roehampton, United Kingdom	W35	Hard	(United Kingdom) Sonay Kartal	3–6, 1–6
Loss	6–7	Aug 2024	ITF Ourense, Spain	W50	Hard	Alina Charaeva	6–7^{(7)}, 1–6
Win	7–7	Mar 2025	Kōfu International Open, Japan	W50	Hard	(Japan) Himeno Sakatsume	7–6^{(2)}, 6–3
Loss	7–8	Jun 2026	ITF Taipei, Taiwan	W35	Hard	(South Korea) Back Da-yeon	1–6, 5–7

=== Doubles: 10 (6 titles, 4 runner-ups) ===
Legend W100 tournaments W80 tournaments W25 tournaments W10 tournaments	Finals by surface Hard (6–4)

Result	W–L	Date	Tournament	Tier	Surface	Partner	Opponents	Score
Win	1–0	Mar 2015	ITF Kofu, Japan	10k	Hard	(Japan) Aiko Yoshitomi	(Japan) Rika Fujiwara (Japan) Akari Inoue	6–2, 6–3
Loss	1–1	Dec 2015	ITF Hong Kong, China	10k	Hard	(Japan) Mana Ayukawa	(Finland) Emma Laine (Japan) Yukina Saigo	w/o
Win	2–1	Jun 2016	ITF Kaohsiung, Taiwan	10k	Hard	(Japan) Erina Hayashi	(Chinese Taipei) Chen Pei-hsuan (Chinese Taipei) Wu Fang-hsien	6–4, 3–6, [10–7]
Win	3–1	Jun 2018	ITF Singapore	25k	Hard	(Japan) Akiko Omae	(South Korea) Han Na-lae (South Korea) Lee So-ra	7–5, 6–2
Win	4–1	Feb 2019	ITF Jodhpur, India	W25	Hard	(Japan) Mana Ayukawa	(Japan) Eri Hozumi (Japan) Miyabi Inoue	7–6^{(4)}, 4–6, [10–5]
Loss	4–2	May 2019	ITF Nonthaburi, Thailand	W25	Hard	(Japan) Risa Ozaki	(Bulgaria) Aleksandrina Naydenova (Turkey) İpek Soylu	1–6, 3–6
Win	5–2	Jun 2019	ITF Jakarta, Indonesia	W25	Hard	(Japan) Junri Namigata	(Indonesia) Beatrice Gumulya (Indonesia) Jessy Rompies	6–2, 4–6, [10–7]
Loss	5–3	Jul 2019	ITF Saskatoon, Canada	W25	Hard	(Japan) Momoko Kobori	(Chinese Taipei) Hsu Chieh-yu (Mexico) Marcela Zacarías	3–6, 2–6
Win	6–3	Jul 2019	Challenger de Granby, Canada	W80	Hard	(Japan) Junri Namigata	(United States) Quinn Gleason (United States) Ingrid Neel	7–6^{(5)}, 5–7, [10–8]
Loss	6–4	Nov 2019	Tokyo Open, Japan	W100	Hard	(Japan) Junri Namigata	(South Korea) Choi Ji-hee (South Korea) Han Na-lae	3–6, 3–6
