= 1997 ANZ Tasmanian International – Doubles =

Doubles
- 1997 ANZ Tasmanian International

Final
- Champions: (Japan) Naoko Kijimuta (Japan) Nana Miyagi
- Runners-up: (Germany) Barbara Rittner (Belgium) Dominique Van Roost
- Score: 6–3, 6–1

Details
- Draw: 16
- Seeds: 4

Events
Singles	Doubles
← 1996 ·	Hobart International	· 1998 →

Yayuk Basuki and Kyoko Nagatsuka were the defending champions but did not compete that year.

Naoko Kijimuta and Nana Miyagi won in the final 6–3, 6–1 against Barbara Rittner and Dominique Van Roost.

== Seeds ==
Champion seeds are indicated in bold text while text in italics indicates the round in which those seeds were eliminated.

1. (Ukraine) Natalia Medvedeva / (Latvia) Larisa Neiland (semifinals)
2. (Japan) **Naoko Kijimuta** / (Japan) **Nana Miyagi (champions)**
3. (Belgium) Els Callens / (Italy) Rita Grande (quarterfinals)
4. (Australia) Annabel Ellwood / (France) Alexandra Fusai (semifinals)

== Draw ==
=== Key ===
- Q = Qualifier
- WC = Wild card
- LL = Lucky loser
- Alt = Alternate
- ITF = ITF entry
- PR = Protected ranking
- SR = Special ranking
- SE = Special exempt
- JE = Junior exempt
- JR = Junior Accelerator Programme entrant
- CO = College Accelerator Programme entrant
- NG = Next Gen Accelerator Program entrant
- w/o = Walkover
- r = Retired
- d = Defaulted

First round
1	(Ukraine) **N Medvedeva** (Latvia) **L Neiland**	3	**6**	**6**
(Austria) K Kschwendt (Austria) B Schett	**6**	1	3
(Spain) **V Ruano-Pascual** (Argentina) **P Suárez**	4	**6**	**6**
LL	(Germany) C Porwik (Germany) M Weingärtner	**6**	4	2
3	(Belgium) **E Callens** (Italy) **R Grande**	**6**	**6**
(United States) M Werdel-Witmeyer (United Kingdom) C Wood	3	4
(Russia) E Likhovtseva (France) A-G Sidot	6	4
(Germany) **B Rittner** (Belgium) **D Van Roost**	**7**	**6**
(Japan) M Saeki (Japan) Y Yoshida	**6**	4	0
(Argentina) **F Labat** (Russia) **E Makarova**	3	**6**	**6**
(Poland) M Grzybowska (Chinese Taipei) S-T Wang	4	3
4	(Australia) **A Ellwood** (France) **A Fusai**	**6**	**6**
WC	(Australia) A Jensen (Australia) D Jones	1	**6**	4
(Canada) **P Hy-Boulais** (United States) **C Morariu**	**6**	3	**6**
Q	(Germany) W Probst (Switzerland) P Schnyder	4	**6**	1
2	(Japan) **N Kijimuta** (Japan) **N Miyagi**	**6**	1	**6**

Quarterfinals
1	(Ukraine) **N Medvedeva** (Latvia) **L Neiland**	4	**6**	**6**
(Spain) V Ruano-Pascual (Argentina) P Suárez	**6**	2	4
3	(Belgium) E Callens (Italy) R Grande	2	2
(Germany) **B Rittner** (Belgium) **D Van Roost**	**6**	**6**
(Argentina) F Labat (Russia) E Makarova	3	4
4	(Australia) **A Ellwood** (France) **A Fusai**	**6**	**6**
(Canada) P Hy-Boulais (United States) C Morariu	3	4
2	(Japan) **N Kijimuta** (Japan) **N Miyagi**	**6**	**6**

Semifinals
1	(Ukraine) N Medvedeva (Latvia) L Neiland	2	3
(Germany) **B Rittner** (Belgium) **D Van Roost**	**6**	**6**
4	(Australia) A Ellwood (France) A Fusai	1	3
2	(Japan) **N Kijimuta** (Japan) **N Miyagi**	**6**	**6**

Final
(Germany) Barbara Rittner (Belgium) Dominique Van Roost	3	1
2	(Japan) **Naoko Kijimuta** (Japan) **Nana Miyagi**	**6**	**6**
