= 1998 ANZ Tasmanian International =

- Date: 11–17 January
- Edition: 5th
- Category: Tier IV
- Draw: 32S / 16D
- Prize money: $107,500
- Surface: Hard / Outdoor
- Location: Hobart, Australia
- Venue: Hobart International Tennis Centre

Champions

Singles
- (Switzerland) Patty Schnyder

Doubles
- (Spain) Virginia Ruano Pascual (Argentina) Paola Suárez
← 1997 ·	Hobart International	· 1999 →

The 1998 ANZ Tasmanian International was a tennis tournament played on outdoor hard courts at the Hobart International Tennis Centre in Hobart in Australia that was part of Tier IV of the 1998 WTA Tour. The tournament was held from 11 through 17 January 1998.

== Finals ==
=== Singles ===
(Switzerland) Patty Schnyder defeated (Belgium) Dominique Van Roost, 6–3, 6–2

- It was Schnyder's 1st title of the year and the 1st of her career.

=== Doubles ===
(Spain) Virginia Ruano Pascual / (Argentina) Paola Suárez' defeated (France) Julie Halard-Decugis / (Slovakia) Janette Husárová, 7–6^{(8–6)}, 6–3

- It was Ruano Pascual's 1st title of the year and the 2nd of her career. It was Suárez's 1st title of the year and the 2nd of her career.
