= 1996 Schweppes Tasmanian International – Doubles =

Doubles
- 1996 Schweppes Tasmanian International

Final
- Champions: (Indonesia) Yayuk Basuki; (Japan) Kyōko Nagatsuka
- Runners-up: (Australia) Kerry-Anne Guse; (South Korea) Sung-Hee Park
- Score: 7–6, 6–3

Details
- Draw: 16
- Seeds: 4

Events
Singles	Doubles
← 1995 ·	Hobart International	· 1997 →

Kyōko Nagatsuka and Ai Sugiyama were the defending champions but only Nagatsuka competed that year with Yayuk Basuki.

Basuki and Nagatsuka won in the final 7–6, 6–3 against Kerry-Anne Guse and Sung-Hee Park.

== Seeds ==
Champion seeds are indicated in bold text while text in italics indicates the round in which those seeds were eliminated.

1. (Belgium) Els Callens / (France) Julie Halard-Decugis (quarterfinals)
2. (Indonesia) **Yayuk Basuki** / (Japan) **Kyōko Nagatsuka (champions)**
3. (Belgium) Laurence Courtois / (Belgium) Nancy Feber (semifinals)
4. (Sweden) Maria Lindström / (Sweden) Maria Strandlund (semifinals)

== Draw ==
=== Key ===
- Q = Qualifier
- WC = Wild card
- LL = Lucky loser
- Alt = Alternate
- ITF = ITF entry
- PR = Protected ranking
- SR = Special ranking
- SE = Special exempt
- JE = Junior exempt
- JR = Junior Accelerator Programme entrant
- CO = College Accelerator Programme entrant
- NG = Next Gen Accelerator Program entrant
- w/o = Walkover
- r = Retired
- d = Defaulted

First round

Quarterfinals

Semifinals

Final

1
- (Belgium) **E Callens**
- (France) **J Halard-Decugis**
4
**6**
**6**

- (Italy) S Cecchini
- (Germany) C Singer
**6**
4
1

1
- (Belgium) E Callens
- (France) J Halard-Decugis
4
2

- (Poland) M Grzybowska
- (Poland) A Olsza
2
5

- (Australia) **K-A Guse**
- (South Korea) **S-H Park**
**6**
**6**

- (Australia) **K-A Guse**
- (South Korea) **S-H Park**
**6**
**7**

- (Australia) **K-A Guse**
- (South Korea) **S-H Park**
3
**6**
**6**

3
- (Belgium) **L Courtois**
- (Belgium) **N Feber**
4
**6**
**6**

3
- (Belgium) L Courtois
- (Belgium) N Feber
**6**
2
3

WC
- (Australia) A Ellwood
- (Australia) K Godridge
**6**
4
2

3
- (Belgium) **L Courtois**
- (Belgium) **N Feber**
**6**
**6**

- (Japan) N Miyagi
- (United States) S Reece
6
1

- (Austria) P Schwarz
- (Slovakia) K Studeníková
2
2

- (Austria) **P Schwarz**
- (Slovakia) **K Studeníková**
**7**
**6**

- (Australia) Kerry-Anne Guse
- (South Korea) Sung-Hee Park
6
3

- (Italy) S Farina
- (Italy) R Grande
**6**
2
2

2
- (Indonesia) **Yayuk Basuki**
- (Japan) **Kyōko Nagatsuka**
**7**
**6**

Q
- (United States) **E deLone**
- (Australia) **N Pratt**
2
**6**
**6**

Q
- (United States) E deLone
- (Australia) N Pratt
4
1

- (Russia) E Likhovtseva
- (Russia) E Makarova
**6**
4
1

4
- (Sweden) **M Lindström**
- (Sweden) **M Strandlund**
**6**
**6**

4
- (Sweden) **M Lindström**
- (Sweden) **M Strandlund**
3
**6**
**6**

4
- (Sweden) M Lindström
- (Sweden) M Strandlund
**6**
0
6

- (United States) A Grossman
- (United States) T Whitlinger-Jones
0
1

2
- (Indonesia) **Y Basuki**
- (Japan) **K Nagatsuka**
4
**6**
**7**

- (Japan) **M Endo**
- (France) **A Fusai**
**6**
**6**

- (Japan) M Endo
- (France) A Fusai
2
3

- (Argentina) F Labat
- (United States) D Scott
4
6

2
- (Indonesia) **Y Basuki**
- (Japan) **K Nagatsuka**
**6**
**6**

2
- (Indonesia) **Y Basuki**
- (Japan) **K Nagatsuka**
**6**
**7**
