= 1998 ANZ Tasmanian International – Doubles =

Doubles
- 1998 ANZ Tasmanian International

Final
- Champions: (Spain) Virginia Ruano Pascual (Argentina) Paola Suárez
- Runners-up: (France) Julie Halard-Decugis (Slovakia) Janette Husárová
- Score: 7–6, 6–3

Events
Singles	Doubles
← 1997 ·	Hobart International	· 1999 →

Naoko Kijimuta and Nana Miyagi were the defending champions but did not compete that year.

Virginia Ruano Pascual and Paola Suárez won in the final 7–6, 6–3 against Julie Halard-Decugis and Janette Husárová.

== Seeds ==
Champion seeds are indicated in bold text while text in italics indicates the round in which those seeds were eliminated.

1. (Argentina) Florencia Labat / (Russia) Elena Likhovtseva (quarterfinals)
2. (Czech Republic) Eva Melicharová / (Czech Republic) Helena Vildová (first round)
3. (South Korea) Sung-Hee Park / (Chinese Taipei) Shi-Ting Wang (semifinals)
4. (Italy) Silvia Farina / (Austria) Barbara Schett (first round)

== Draw ==
=== Key ===
- Q = Qualifier
- WC = Wild card
- LL = Lucky loser
- Alt = Alternate
- SE = Special exempt
- PR = Protected ranking
- ITF = ITF entry
- JE = Junior exempt
- w/o = Walkover
- r = Retired
- d = Defaulted
- SR = Special ranking

First round
1	(Argentina) **F Labat** (Russia) **E Likhovtseva**	**6**	**7**
(Germany) W Probst (France) A-G Sidot	4	6
(Germany) M Babel (Australia) C Barclay	1	**6**	3
(Spain) **V Ruano Pascual** (Argentina) **P Suárez**	**6**	3	**6**
3	(South Korea) **S-H Park** (Chinese Taipei) **S-T Wang**	**7**	**6**
(Sweden) Å Carlsson (Canada) P Hy-Boulais	5	3
(Australia) **D Jones** (Italy) **F Perfetti**	6	**7**	**7**
WC	(Australia) E Dominikovic (Australia) S Drake-Brockman	**7**	6	5
(Switzerland) P Schnyder (Thailand) T Tanasugarn	**6**	1	3
(Poland) **M Grzybowska** (Germany) **E Wagner**	4	**6**	**6**
(France) **J Halard-Decugis** (Slovakia) **J Husárová**	**6**	**6**
4	(Italy) S Farina (Austria) B Schett	3	1
Q	(Austria) M Maruska (Austria) B Schwartz	**6**	4	4
(Australia) **A Ellwood** (Australia) **N Pratt**	3	**6**	**6**
(Japan) **M Saeki** (Japan) **Y Yoshida**	**6**	**6**
2	(Czech Republic) E Melicharová (Czech Republic) H Vildová	2	0

Quarterfinals
1	(Argentina) F Labat (Russia) E Likhovtseva	4	**6**	4
(Spain) **V Ruano Pascual** (Argentina) **P Suárez**	**6**	2	**6**
3	(South Korea) **S-H Park** (Chinese Taipei) **S-T Wang**	**6**	**6**
(Australia) D Jones (Italy) F Perfetti	3	2
(Poland) M Grzybowska (Germany) E Wagner	0	**7**	2
(France) **J Halard-Decugis** (Slovakia) **J Husárová**	**6**	5	**6**
(Australia) A Ellwood (Australia) N Pratt	2	4
(Japan) **M Saeki** (Japan) **Y Yoshida**	**6**	**6**

Semifinals
(Spain) **V Ruano Pascual** (Argentina) **P Suárez**	**6**	2	**6**
3	(South Korea) S-H Park (Chinese Taipei) S-T Wang	4	**6**	4
(France) **J Halard-Decugis** (Slovakia) **J Husárová**	**6**	**7**
(Japan) M Saeki (Japan) Y Yoshida	2	5

Final
(Spain) **Virginia Ruano Pascual** (Argentina) **Paola Suárez**	**7**	**6**
(France) Julie Halard-Decugis (Slovakia) Janette Husárová	6	3
