= 2017 Hobart International =

Coordinates: 42°52′24″S 147°19′47″E

- Date: 9–15 January 2017
- Edition: 24rd
- Category: WTA International tournaments
- Draw: 32S / 16D
- Prize money: $250,000
- Surface: Hard
- Location: Hobart, Australia
- Venue: Hobart International Tennis Centre

Champions

Singles
- (Belgium) Elise Mertens

Doubles
- (Romania) Raluca Olaru / (Ukraine) Olga Savchuk
← 2016 ·	Hobart International	· 2018 →

The 2017 Hobart International was a women's tennis tournament played on outdoor hard courts. It was the 24nd edition of the event and part of the WTA International tournaments of the 2017 WTA Tour. It took place at the Hobart International Tennis Centre in Hobart, Australia from 9 through 15 January 2017.

== Finals ==
=== Singles ===
- (Belgium) Elise Mertens defeated (Romania) Monica Niculescu, 6–3, 6–1

=== Doubles ===
- (Romania) Raluca Olaru / (Ukraine) Olga Savchuk defeated (Canada) Gabriela Dabrowski / (China) Yang Zhaoxuan, 0–6, 6–4, [10–5]

== Points and prize money ==
=== Point distribution ===
Event	W	F	SF	QF	Round of 16	Round of 32	Q	Q3	Q2	Q1
Singles	280	180	110	60	30	1	18	14	10	1
Doubles	280	180	110	60	1	—	—	—	—	—

=== Prize money ===
Event	W	F	SF	QF	Round of 16	Round of 32^{2}	Q3	Q2	Q1
Singles	$43,000	$21,400	$11,300	$5,900	$3,310	$1,925	$1,005	$730	$530
Doubles	$12,300	$6,400	$3,435	$1,820	$960	—	—	—	—
Doubles prize money per team

^{2} Qualifiers prize money is also the Round of 32 prize money.

== Singles main-draw entrants ==
=== Seeds ===
Country	Player	Rank^{1}	Seed
NED	Kiki Bertens	22	1
LAT	Anastasija Sevastova	34	2
ROU	Monica Niculescu	38	3
~~USA~~	~~Alison Riske~~	~~39~~	~~4~~
JPN	Misaki Doi	40	5
~~FRA~~	~~Alizé Cornet~~	~~41~~	~~6~~
FRA	Kristina Mladenovic	42	7
~~CRO~~	~~Ana Konjuh~~	~~47~~	~~8~~
~~JPN~~	~~Naomi Osaka~~	~~48~~	~~9~~
~~ITA~~	~~Sara Errani~~	~~49~~	~~10~~
SWE	Johanna Larsson	50	11

- ^{1} Rankings as of 2 January 2017.

=== Other entrants ===
The following players received wildcards into the singles main draw:

- (Australia) Lizette Cabrera
- (Australia) Jaimee Fourlis
- (Italy) Francesca Schiavone

The following players received entry using a protected ranking:

- (Kazakhstan) Galina Voskoboeva

The following players received entry from the qualifying draw:

- (Croatia) Jana Fett
- (Belgium) Elise Mertens
- (Japan) Risa Ozaki
- (Brazil) Teliana Pereira

The following players received entry as lucky losers:

- (Netherlands) Cindy Burger
- (Paraguay) Verónica Cepede Royg
- (United States) Nicole Gibbs
- (Luxembourg) Mandy Minella
- (Japan) Kurumi Nara
- (Spain) Sílvia Soler Espinosa
- (United States) Sachia Vickery

=== Withdrawals ===
Before the tournament

- (France) Alizé Cornet (back injury) → replaced by (Netherlands) Cindy Burger
- (Italy) Sara Errani (left thigh injury) → replaced by (Japan) Kurumi Nara
- (Germany) Julia Görges (change in schedule) → replaced by (Paraguay) Verónica Cepede Royg
- (Croatia) Ana Konjuh (left toe injury) → replaced by (Luxembourg) Mandy Minella
- (Japan) Naomi Osaka (left wrist injury) → replaced by (United States) Nicole Gibbs
- (United States) Alison Riske (change in schedule) → replaced by (Spain) Sílvia Soler Espinosa
- (Czech Republic) Kateřina Siniaková (change in schedule) → replaced by (United States) Sachia Vickery

During the tournament

- (Ukraine) Lesia Tsurenko

=== Retirements ===
- (United States) Sachia Vickery

== Doubles main-draw entrants ==
=== Seeds ===
Country	Player	Country	Player	Rank^{1}	Seed
ROU	Monica Niculescu	USA	Abigail Spears	40	1
NED	Kiki Bertens	SWE	Johanna Larsson	63	2
CAN	Gabriela Dabrowski	CHN	Yang Zhaoxuan	99	3
ARG	María Irigoyen	CHN	Liang Chen	114	4

- ^{1} Rankings as of 2 January 2017.

=== Other entrants ===
The following pairs received wildcards into the doubles main draw:

- (Australia) Ashleigh Barty / (Australia) Casey Dellacqua
- (France) Pauline Parmentier / (Italy) Francesca Schiavone

The following pairs received entry as alternates:

- (Australia) Alison Bai / (Australia) Lizette Cabrera
- (Australia) Jessica Moore / (Thailand) Varatchaya Wongteanchai

=== Withdrawals ===
Before the tournament

- (Australia) Ashleigh Barty
- (Japan) Kurumi Nara

During the tournament

- (Italy) Sara Errani
- (Ukraine) Lyudmyla Kichenok
- (United States) Abigail Spears
