= 2019 Hobart International =

Coordinates: 42°52′24″S 147°19′47″E

- Date: 7–12 January 2019
- Edition: 26th
- Category: WTA International tournaments
- Draw: 32S / 16D
- Prize money: $250,000
- Surface: Hard
- Location: Hobart, Australia
- Venue: Hobart International Tennis Centre

Champions

Singles
- (United States) Sofia Kenin

Doubles
- (Chinese Taipei) Chan Hao-ching / (Chinese Taipei) Latisha Chan
← 2018 ·	Hobart International	· 2020 →

The 2019 Hobart International was a women's tennis tournament played on outdoor hard courts. It was the 26th edition of the Hobart International and was part of the WTA International tournaments of the 2019 WTA Tour. It took place at the Hobart International Tennis Centre in Hobart, Australia from 7 to 12 January 2019.

The singles was won by unseeded American Sofia Kenin who took home her first WTA title after defeating Anna Karolína Schmiedlová from Slovakia in straight sets. In the doubles it was Taiwanese pair in Chan Hao-ching and Latisha Chan who won in three sets over their opponents in Kirsten Flipkens and Johanna Larsson.

== Finals ==
=== Singles ===
- (United States) Sofia Kenin defeated (Slovakia) Anna Karolína Schmiedlová, 6–3, 6–0

=== Doubles ===
- (Chinese Taipei) Chan Hao-ching / (Chinese Taipei) Latisha Chan defeated (Belgium) Kirsten Flipkens / (Sweden) Johanna Larsson, 6–3, 3–6, [10–6]

== Points and prize money ==
=== Point distribution ===
Event^{1}	W	F	SF	QF	Round of 16	Round of 32	Q	Q2	Q1
Singles	280	180	110	60	30	1	18	12	1
Doubles	280	180	110	60	1	—	—	—	—

=== Prize money ===
Event	W	F	SF	QF	Round of 16	Round of 32^{2}	Q	Q2	Q1
Singles	$43,000	$21,400	$11,500	$6,175	$3,400	$2,100	—	$1,020	$600
Doubles	$12,300	$6,400	$3,435	$1,820	$960	—	—	—	—
Doubles prize money per team

^{1} Points per the WTA.
^{2} Qualifiers prize money is also the Round of 32 prize money

== Singles main-draw entrants ==
=== Seeds ===
Country	Player	Rank^{1}	Seed
FRA	Caroline Garcia	19	1
ROU	Mihaela Buzărnescu	24	2
CHN	Zhang Shuai	40	3
GRE	Maria Sakkari	41	4
RUS	Anastasia Pavlyuchenkova	42	5
FRA	Alizé Cornet	45	6
BEL	Kirsten Flipkens	47	7
BEL	Alison Van Uytvanck	49	8

- ^{1} Rankings as of 31 December 2018.

=== Other entrants ===
The following players received wildcards into the singles main draw:

- (France) Caroline Garcia
- (Australia) Zoe Hives
- (Australia) Ellen Perez

The following players received entry from the qualifying draw:

- (Australia) Alison Bai
- (Russia) Anna Blinkova
- (Poland) Magda Linette
- (Belgium) Greet Minnen
- (Germany) Laura Siegemund
- (United Kingdom) Heather Watson

The following players received entry as lucky losers:

- (United States) Madison Brengle
- (Ukraine) Kateryna Kozlova

=== Withdrawals ===
Before the tournament

- (Canada) Eugenie Bouchard → replaced by (Slovakia) Anna Karolína Schmiedlová
- (Sweden) Rebecca Peterson → replaced by (Romania) Ana Bogdan
- (United States) Alison Riske → replaced by (United States) Madison Brengle
- (Slovakia) Magdaléna Rybáriková → replaced by (Russia) Evgeniya Rodina
- (China) Wang Yafan → replaced by (Ukraine) Kateryna Kozlova

== WTA doubles main-draw entrants ==
=== Seeds ===
Country	Player	Country	Player	Rank^{1}	Seed
TPE	Chan Hao-ching	TPE	Latisha Chan	45	1
ROU	Irina-Camelia Begu	ROU	Mihaela Buzărnescu	48	2
ROU	Monica Niculescu	CHN	Yang Zhaoxuan	73	3
BEL	Kirsten Flipkens	SWE	Johanna Larsson	74	4

- ^{1} Rankings as of 31 December 2018

=== Other entrants ===
The following pairs received wildcards into the doubles main draw:

- (Australia) Alison Bai / (Australia) Annerly Poulos
- (Australia) Zoe Hives / (Australia) Ellen Perez

=== Withdrawals ===
During the tournament

- (Slovenia) Dalila Jakupović (viral illness)
