= 2020 Hobart International =

Coordinates: 42°52′24″S 147°19′47″E

- Date: 13–18 January 2020
- Edition: 27th
- Category: WTA International tournaments
- Draw: 32S / 16D
- Prize money: $275,000
- Surface: Hard
- Location: Hobart, Australia
- Venue: Hobart International Tennis Centre

Champions

Singles
- (Kazakhstan) Elena Rybakina

Doubles
- (Ukraine) Nadiia Kichenok / (India) Sania Mirza
← 2019 ·	Hobart International	· 2023 →

The 2020 Hobart International was a women's tennis tournament played on outdoor hard courts. It was the 27th edition of the Hobart International and part of the WTA International tournaments of the 2020 WTA Tour. It took place at the Hobart International Tennis Centre in Hobart, Australia from 13 to 18 January 2020. Third-seeded Elena Rybakina won the singles title.

== Finals ==
=== Singles ===
- (Kazakhstan) Elena Rybakina defeated (China) Zhang Shuai 7–6^{(9–7)}, 6–3

=== Doubles ===
- (Ukraine) Nadiia Kichenok / (India) Sania Mirza defeated (China) Peng Shuai / (China) Zhang Shuai 6–4, 6–4

== Points and prize money ==
=== Point distribution ===
Event^{1}	W	F	SF	QF	Round of 16	Round of 32	Q	Q2	Q1
Singles	280	180	110	60	30	1	18	12	1
Doubles	280	180	110	60	1	—	—	—	—

=== Prize money ===
Event	W	F	SF	QF	Round of 16	Round of 32^{2}	Q	Q2	Q1
Singles	$75,000	$50,400	$20,600	$6,275	$3,600	$2,300	—	$1,685	$1,100
Doubles	$13,580	$7,200	$4,000	$2,300	$1,520	—	—	—	—
Doubles prize money per team

^{1} Points per the WTA.
^{2} Qualifiers prize money is also the Round of 32 prize money.

== Singles main-draw entrants ==
=== Seeds ===
Country	Player	Rank^{1}	Seed
BEL	Elise Mertens	17	1
ESP	Garbiñe Muguruza	35	2
KAZ	Elena Rybakina	36	3
CHN	Zhang Shuai	38	4
RUS	Veronika Kudermetova	42	5
POL	Magda Linette	43	6
SWE	Rebecca Peterson	44	7
FRA	Caroline Garcia	46	8

- ^{1} Rankings as of 6 January 2020.

=== Other entrants ===
The following players received wildcards into the singles main draw:

- (Australia) Lizette Cabrera
- (Spain) Garbiñe Muguruza
- (Australia) Astra Sharma
- (Australia) Samantha Stosur

The following player received entry using a protected ranking into the singles main draw:

- (United States) Catherine Bellis

The following players received entry from the qualifying draw:

- (Romania) ~~Sorana Cîrstea~~ (withdrew)
- (Tunisia) Ons Jabeur
- (Ukraine) Kateryna Kozlova
- (United States) Christina McHale
- (Spain) Sara Sorribes Tormo
- (United Kingdom) Heather Watson

The following player received entry as a lucky loser:

- (Serbia) Nina Stojanović

== WTA doubles main-draw entrants ==
=== Seeds ===
Country	Player	Country	Player	Rank^{1}	Seed
TPE	Chan Hao-ching	TPE	Latisha Chan	30	1
CHN	Peng Shuai	CHN	Zhang Shuai	60	2
JPN	Makoto Ninomiya	CZE	Renata Voráčová	115	3
ESP	Georgina García Pérez	ESP	Sara Sorribes Tormo	133	4

- ^{1} Rankings as of 6 January 2020

=== Other entrants ===
The following pairs received wildcards into the doubles main draw:

- (Australia) Lizette Cabrera / (Australia) Samantha Stosur
- (Australia) Jessica Moore / (Australia) Astra Sharma

The following pairs received entry into the doubles main draw using protected rankings:

- (Ukraine) Kateryna Bondarenko / (Canada) Sharon Fichman
- (Ukraine) Nadiia Kichenok / (India) Sania Mirza
