= 1996 Schweppes Tasmanian International =

- Date: 8–14 January
- Edition: 3rd
- Category: Tier IV
- Draw: 32S / 16D
- Prize money: $107,500
- Surface: Hard / outdoor
- Location: Hobart, Australia

Champions

Singles
- (France) Julie Halard-Decugis

Doubles
- (Indonesia) Yayuk Basuki / (Japan) Kyoko Nagatsuka
← 1995 ·	Hobart International	· 1997 →

The 1996 Schweppes Tasmanian International was a women's tennis tournament played on outdoor hard courts at the Hobart International Tennis Centre in Hobart in Australia that was part of the Tier IV category of the 1996 WTA Tour. It was the third edition of the tournament and was held from 8 through 14 January 1996. Unseeded Julie Halard-Decugis won the singles title.

== Finals ==
=== Singles ===
(France) Julie Halard-Decugis defeated (Japan) Mana Endo 6–1, 6–2

- It was Halard-Decugis' 1st singles title of the year and the 5th of her career.

=== Doubles ===
(Indonesia) Yayuk Basuki / (Japan) Kyoko Nagatsuka defeated (Australia) Kerry-Anne Guse / (South Korea) Sung-Hee Park 7–6, 6–3

- It was Basuki's 1st doubles title of the year and the 4th of her career. It was Nagatsuka's only doubles title of the year and the 2nd and last of her career.
