= 1997 ANZ Tasmanian International =

- Date: 6–12 January
- Edition: 4th
- Category: Tier IV
- Draw: 32S / 16D
- Prize money: $107,500
- Surface: Hard / outdoor
- Location: Hobart, Australia
- Venue: Hobart International Tennis Centre

Champions

Singles
- (Belgium) Dominique Van Roost

Doubles
- (Japan) Naoko Kijimuta / (Japan) Nana Miyagi
← 1996 ·	Hobart International	· 1998 →

The 1997 ANZ Tasmanian International was a women's tennis tournament played on outdoor hard courts at the Hobart International Tennis Centre in Hobart in Australia that was part of the Tier IV category of the 1997 WTA Tour. It was the fourth edition of the tournament and was held from 6 through 12 January 1997. Unseeded Dominique Van Roost won the singles title.

== Finals ==
=== Singles ===
(Belgium) Dominique Van Roost defeated (United States) Marianne Werdel-Witmeyer 6–3, 6–3

- It was Van Roost's 1st singles title of the year and the 2nd of her career.

=== Doubles ===
(Japan) Naoko Kijimuta / (Japan) Nana Miyagi defeated (Germany) Barbara Rittner / (Belgium) Dominique Van Roost 6–3, 6–1

- It was Kijimuta's 2nd title of the year and the 4th of her career. It was Miyagi's 2nd title of the year and the 6th of her career.
