= 2018 Hobart International =

Coordinates: 42°52′24″S 147°19′47″E

- Date: 7–13 January 2018
- Edition: 25th
- Category: WTA International tournaments
- Draw: 32S / 16D
- Prize money: $250,000
- Surface: Hard
- Location: Hobart, Australia
- Venue: Hobart International Tennis Centre

Champions

Singles
- (Belgium) Elise Mertens

Doubles
- (Belgium) Elise Mertens / (Netherlands) Demi Schuurs
← 2017 ·	Hobart International	· 2019 →

The 2018 Hobart International was a women's tennis tournament played on outdoor hard courts. It was the 25th edition of the event and part of the WTA International tournaments of the 2018 WTA Tour. It took place at the Hobart International Tennis Centre in Hobart, Australia from 7 through 13 January 2018.

== Finals ==
=== Singles ===
- (Belgium) Elise Mertens defeated (Romania) Mihaela Buzărnescu, 6–1, 4–6, 6–3

=== Doubles ===
- (Belgium) Elise Mertens / (Netherlands) Demi Schuurs defeated (Ukraine) Lyudmyla Kichenok / (Japan) Makoto Ninomiya, 6–2, 6–2

== Points and prize money ==
=== Point distribution ===
Event	W	F	SF	QF	Round of 16	Round of 32	Q	Q2	Q1
Singles	280	180	110	60	30	1	18	12	1
Doubles	280	180	110	60	1	—	—	—	—

=== Prize money ===
Event	W	F	SF	QF	Round of 16	Round of 32^{2}	Q	Q2	Q1
Singles	$43,000	$21,400	$11,500	$6,175	$3,400	$2,100	—	$1,020	$600
Doubles	$12,300	$6,400	$3,435	$1,820	$960	—	—	—	—
Doubles prize money per team

^{2} Qualifiers prize money is also the Round of 32 prize money.

== Singles main-draw entrants ==
=== Seeds ===
Country	Player	Rank^{1}	Seed
CHN	Zhang Shuai	35	1
BEL	Elise Mertens	36	2
ROU	Sorana Cîrstea	37	3
FRA	Alizé Cornet	38	4
UKR	Lesia Tsurenko	42	5
ROU	Irina-Camelia Begu	43	6
GER	Tatjana Maria	46	7
CZE	Kateřina Siniaková	47	8

- ^{1} Rankings as of 1 January 2018.

=== Other entrants ===
The following players received wildcards into the singles main draw:

- (Canada) Eugenie Bouchard
- (Australia) Lizette Cabrera
- (Australia) Jaimee Fourlis

The following players received entry using a protected ranking:

- (Germany) Anna-Lena Friedsam

The following players received entry from the qualifying draw:

- (Belgium) Kirsten Flipkens
- (Japan) Kurumi Nara
- (Romania) Monica Niculescu
- (Serbia) Nina Stojanović
- (Belgium) Alison Van Uytvanck
- (United Kingdom) Heather Watson

=== Withdrawals ===
Before the tournament

- (United States) Shelby Rogers → replaced by (Brazil) Beatriz Haddad Maia

During the tournament

- (Belgium) Kirsten Flipkens
- (Romania) Monica Niculescu

== Doubles main-draw entrants ==
=== Seeds ===
Country	Player	Country	Player	Rank^{1}	Seed
ROU	Raluca Olaru	UKR	Olga Savchuk	69	1
BEL	Kirsten Flipkens	USA	Nicole Melichar	80	2
BEL	Elise Mertens	NED	Demi Schuurs	89	3
UKR	Lyudmyla Kichenok	JPN	Makoto Ninomiya	99	4

- ^{1} Rankings as of 1 January 2018.

=== Other entrants ===
The following pairs received wildcards into the doubles main draw:

- (Australia) Alison Bai / (Australia) Lizette Cabrera
- (Australia) Jaimee Fourlis / (Australia) Jessica Moore

=== Withdrawals ===
During the tournament

- (Belgium) Kirsten Flipkens
