= 1998 ANZ Tasmanian International – Singles =

Singles
- 1998 ANZ Tasmanian International

Final
- Champion: (Switzerland) Patty Schnyder
- Runner-up: (Belgium) Dominique Van Roost
- Score: 6–3, 6–2

Details
- Draw: 32
- Seeds: 8

Events
Singles	Doubles
← 1997 ·	Hobart International	· 1999 →

Dominique Van Roost was the defending champion but lost in the final 6–3, 6–2 against Patty Schnyder.

== Seeds ==
A champion seed is indicated in bold text while text in italics indicates the round in which that seed was eliminated.

1. (Belgium) Dominique Van Roost (final)
2. (Switzerland) **Patty Schnyder (champion)**
3. (South Africa) Joannette Kruger (semifinals)
4. (Japan) Naoko Sawamatsu (second round)
5. (Slovakia) Henrieta Nagyová (quarterfinals)
6. (France) Anne-Gaëlle Sidot (quarterfinals)
7. (Austria) Barbara Schett (quarterfinals)
8. (Russia) Elena Likhovtseva (first round)

== Draw ==
=== Key ===
- Q = Qualifier
- WC = Wild card
- LL = Lucky loser
- Alt = Alternate
- SE = Special exempt
- PR = Protected ranking
- ITF = ITF entry
- JE = Junior exempt
- w/o = Walkover
- r = Retired
- d = Defaulted
- SR = Special ranking

First round
1	(Belgium) **D Van Roost**	**6**	**6**
(Thailand) T Tanasugarn	2	2
(Belgium) **L Courtois**	**6**	**6**
(Spain) M Serna	1	1
(Czech Republic) S Kleinová	**6**	0	3
(France) **J Halard-Decugis**	2	**6**	**6**
Q	(China) **F Li**	**6**	5	**7**
8	(Russia) E Likhovtseva	2	**7**	5
4	(Japan) **N Sawamatsu**	**7**	**6**
(Italy) S Farina	5	4
(Poland) **M Grzybowska**	**6**	**6**
(France) N Dechy	2	2
Q	(United States) S Cacic	2	3
(Italy) **R Grande**	**6**	**6**
(Venezuela) M Vento	3	2
5	(Slovakia) **H Nagyová**	**6**	**6**
6	(France) **A-G Sidot**	**6**	**6**
(Sweden) Å Carlsson	1	4
(Austria) **M Maruska**	**7**	**7**
(Spain) M Sánchez Lorenzo	6	6
(Spain) **V Ruano Pascual**	**6**	**3**
(Germany) M Babel	2	0	r
(France) S Pitkowski	3	6
3	(South Africa) **J Kruger**	**6**	**7**
7	(Austria) **B Schett**	**6**	**6**
(Argentina) F Labat	3	2
Q	(Canada) **J Nejedly**	4	**6**	**6**
(Czech Republic) D Chládková	**6**	4	2
WC	(Australia) S Drake-Brockman	0	1
Q	(Czech Republic) **A Gerši**	**6**	**6**
WC	(Australia) A Ellwood	**6**	6	1
2	(Switzerland) **P Schnyder**	4	**7**	**6**

Second round
1	(Belgium) **D Van Roost**	**6**	**6**
(Belgium) L Courtois	0	4
(France) J Halard-Decugis	**6**	2	1
Q	(China) **F Li**	3	**6**	**6**
4	(Japan) N Sawamatsu	**6**	6	5
(Poland) **M Grzybowska**	3	**7**	**7**
(Italy) R Grande	3	**6**	0
5	(Slovakia) **H Nagyová**	**6**	3	**6**
6	(France) **A-G Sidot**	6	**6**	**6**
(Austria) M Maruska	**7**	2	2
(Spain) V Ruano Pascual	4	3
3	(South Africa) **J Kruger**	**6**	**6**
7	(Austria) **B Schett**	**6**	**6**
Q	(Canada) J Nejedly	2	0
Q	(Czech Republic) A Gerši	3	3
2	(Switzerland) **P Schnyder**	**6**	**6**

Quarterfinals
1	(Belgium) **D Van Roost**	**7**	**6**
Q	(China) F Li	5	3
(Poland) **M Grzybowska**	**6**	**2**
5	(Slovakia) H Nagyová	1	1	r
6	(France) A-G Sidot	5	2
3	(South Africa) **J Kruger**	**7**	**6**
7	(Austria) B Schett	4	**6**	3
2	(Switzerland) **P Schnyder**	**6**	1	**6**

Semifinals
1	(Belgium) **D Van Roost**	6	**6**	**6**
(Poland) M Grzybowska	**7**	1	3
3	(South Africa) J Kruger	6	2
2	(Switzerland) **P Schnyder**	**7**	**6**

Final
1	(Belgium) D Van Roost	3	2
2	(Switzerland) **Patty Schnyder**	**6**	**6**
