= 1996 Schweppes Tasmanian International – Singles =

Singles
- 1996 Schweppes Tasmanian International

Final
- Champion: (France) Julie Halard-Decugis
- Runner-up: (Japan) Mana Endo
- Score: 6–1, 6–2

Details
- Draw: 32
- Seeds: 8

Events
Singles	Doubles
← 1995 ·	Hobart International	· 1997 →

Leila Meskhi was the defending champion but did not compete that year.

Julie Halard-Decugis won in the final 6–1, 6–2 against Mana Endo.

== Seeds ==
A champion seed is indicated in bold text while text in italics indicates the round in which that seed was eliminated.

1. (Austria) Judith Wiesner (quarterfinals)
2. (Austria) Barbara Paulus (first round)
3. (Indonesia) Yayuk Basuki (second round)
4. (Japan) Yone Kamio (first round)
5. (Japan) Kyōko Nagatsuka (first round)
6. (Germany) Sabine Hack (second round)
7. (Russia) Elena Likhovtseva (second round)
8. (Japan) Ai Sugiyama (quarterfinals)

== Draw ==
=== Key ===
- Q = Qualifier
- WC = Wild card
- LL = Lucky loser
- Alt = Alternate
- ITF = ITF entry
- PR = Protected ranking
- SR = Special ranking
- SE = Special exempt
- JE = Junior exempt
- JR = Junior Accelerator Programme entrant
- CO = College Accelerator Programme entrant
- NG = Next Gen Accelerator Program entrant
- w/o = Walkover
- r = Retired
- d = Defaulted

First round
1	(Austria) **J Wiesner**	**6**	**6**
(United States) L Lee	2	3
Q	(United States) E deLone	1	**6**	5
WC	(Australia) **A Ellwood**	**6**	4	**7**
(Czech Republic) L Richterová	2	4
(Chinese Taipei) **S-T Wang**	**6**	**6**
(Russia) E Makarova	2	**6**	1
7	(Russia) **E Likhovtseva**	**6**	4	**6**
3	(Indonesia) **Y Basuki**	**6**	**6**
(Italy) A Serra Zanetti	2	3
(Italy) **S Farina**	5	**6**	**6**
(Belgium) L Courtois	**7**	3	4
(France) **J Halard-Decugis**	**6**	**6**
(South Korea) S-H Park	0	3
(Germany) **C Singer**	**6**	4	**6**
5	(Japan) K Nagatsuka	1	**6**	2
6	(Germany) **S Hack**	1	**6**	**6**
(Israel) A Smashnova	**6**	2	3
(Austria) B Reinstadler	6	1
(Spain) **V Ruano-Pascual**	**7**	**6**
(Argentina) **F Labat**	**7**	**6**
(United States) L Wild	6	1
Q	(Japan) **N Miyagi**	6	**7**	**6**
4	(Japan) Y Kamio	**7**	5	0
8	(Japan) **A Sugiyama**	3	**6**	**6**
Q	(France) A Fusai	**6**	3	3
WC	(Australia) **K Godridge**	2	**7**	**6**
(Slovakia) K Studeníková	**6**	6	3
(United States) T Whitlinger-Jones	1	3
(Japan) **M Endo**	**6**	**6**
Q	(France) **L Ghirardi**	**6**	2	**6**
2	(Austria) B Paulus	1	**6**	2

Second round
1	(Austria) **J Wiesner**	**7**	**6**
WC	(Australia) A Ellwood	5	4
(Chinese Taipei) **S-T Wang**	**6**	3	**6**
7	(Russia) E Likhovtseva	1	**6**	3
3	(Indonesia) Y Basuki	3	4
(Italy) **S Farina**	**6**	**6**
(France) **J Halard-Decugis**	**6**	**6**
(Germany) C Singer	2	0
6	(Germany) S Hack	4	1	r
(Spain) **V Ruano-Pascual**	**6**	**4**
(Argentina) **F Labat**	**6**	4	**6**
Q	(Japan) N Miyagi	4	**6**	0
8	(Japan) **A Sugiyama**	**7**	**6**
WC	(Australia) K Godridge	5	2
(Japan) **M Endo**	**6**	**6**
Q	(France) L Ghirardi	3	3

Quarterfinals
1	(Austria) J Wiesner	3	3
(Chinese Taipei) **S-T Wang**	**6**	**6**
(Italy) S Farina	**7**	1	4
(France) **J Halard-Decugis**	6	**6**	**6**
(Spain) V Ruano-Pascual	3	3
(Argentina) **F Labat**	**6**	**6**
8	(Japan) A Sugiyama	1	5
(Japan) **M Endo**	**6**	**7**

Semifinals
(Chinese Taipei) S-T Wang	2	2
(France) **J Halard-Decugis**	**6**	**6**
(Argentina) F Labat	2	**6**	4
(Japan) **M Endo**	**6**	2	**6**

Final
(France) **J Halard-Decugis**	**6**	**6**
(Japan) Mana Endo	1	2
