= 1997 ANZ Tasmanian International – Singles =

Singles
- 1997 ANZ Tasmanian International
- 1996 Champion: (France) Julie Halard-Decugis

Final
- Champion: (Belgium) Dominique Van Roost
- Runner-up: (United States) Marianne Werdel-Witmeyer
- Score: 6–3, 6–3

Details
- Draw: 32
- Seeds: 8

Events
Singles	Doubles
← 1996 ·	Hobart International	· 1998 →

Julie Halard-Decugis was the defending champion but did not compete that year.

Dominique Van Roost won in the final 6–3, 6–3 against Marianne Werdel-Witmeyer.

== Seeds ==
A champion seed is indicated in bold text while text in italics indicates the round in which that seed was eliminated.

1. (Russia) Elena Likhovtseva (second round)
2. (Romania) Ruxandra Dragomir (first round)
3. (United States) Linda Wild (first round)
4. (Austria) Barbara Schett (first round)
5. (Italy) Silvia Farina (first round)
6. (Chinese Taipei) Shi-Ting Wang (quarterfinals)
7. (Argentina) Florencia Labat (second round)
8. (Germany) Sabine Hack (second round)

== Draw ==
=== Key ===
- Q = Qualifier
- WC = Wild card
- LL = Lucky loser
- Alt = Alternate
- ITF = ITF entry
- PR = Protected ranking
- SR = Special ranking
- SE = Special exempt
- JE = Junior exempt
- JR = Junior Accelerator Programme entrant
- CO = College Accelerator Programme entrant
- NG = Next Gen Accelerator Program entrant
- w/o = Walkover
- r = Retired
- d = Defaulted

First round
1	(Russia) **E Likhovtseva**	**6**	**6**
(Canada) P Hy-Boulais	2	0
(Belgium) **E Callens**	**7**	**7**
Q	(Japan) M Saeki	6	5
(Argentina) P Suárez	4	2
(France) **A-G Sidot**	**6**	**6**
(United States) L Lee	4	6
8	(Germany) **S Hack**	**6**	**7**
4	(Austria) B Schett	1	3
(United States) **M Werdel-Witmeyer**	**6**	**6**
(Russia) E Makarova	6	1
(Italy) **R Grande**	**7**	**6**
(Japan) N Kijimuta	**6**	5	4
Q	(Poland) **M Grzybowska**	1	**7**	**6**
Q	(Luxembourg) A Kremer	3	**6**	2
6	(Chinese Taipei) **S-T Wang**	**6**	1	**6**
7	(Argentina) **F Labat**	**7**	**7**
(Switzerland) P Schnyder	6	5
(Germany) B Rittner	5	3
Q	(Czech Republic) **L Cenková**	**7**	**6**
(Belgium) **S Devillé**	3	**6**	**6**
(Latvia) L Neiland	**6**	1	2
(Belgium) **D Van Roost**	**6**	**6**
3	(United States) L Wild	1	2
5	(Italy) S Farina	6	4
WC	(Australia) **A Ellwood**	**7**	**6**
WC	(Australia) **S Drake-Brockman**	**6**	**6**
(Japan) N Miyagi	3	0
(United States) **A Miller**	3	**7**	**6**
(Austria) K Kschwendt	**6**	5	0
(Japan) **M Endo**	**6**	**6**
2	(Romania) R Dragomir	1	2

Second round
1	(Russia) E Likhovtseva	**6**	6	0/r
(Belgium) **E Callens**	1	**7**	**2**
(France) **A-G Sidot**	**6**	**6**
8	(Germany) S Hack	1	2
(United States) **M Werdel-Witmeyer**	4	**7**	**7**
(Italy) R Grande	**6**	5	5
Q	(Poland) M Grzybowska	1	3
6	(Chinese Taipei) **S-T Wang**	**6**	**6**
7	(Argentina) F Labat	**6**	6	1
Q	(Czech Republic) **L Cenková**	0	**7**	**6**
(Belgium) S Devillé	3	0
(Belgium) **D Van Roost**	**6**	**6**
WC	(Australia) **A Ellwood**	**6**	**6**
WC	(Australia) S Drake-Brockman	2	4
(United States) A Miller	3	6
(Japan) **M Endo**	**6**	**7**

Quarterfinals
(Belgium) **E Callens**	**6**	3	**6**
(France) A-G Sidot	3	**6**	0
(United States) **M Werdel-Witmeyer**	**6**	**6**
6	(Chinese Taipei) S-T Wang	4	2
Q	(Czech Republic) L Cenková	0	0	r
(Belgium) **D Van Roost**	**6**	**1**
WC	(Australia) A Ellwood	**6**	4	2
(Japan) **M Endo**	3	**6**	**6**

Semifinals
(Belgium) E Callens	3	0
(United States) **M Werdel-Witmeyer**	**6**	**6**
(Belgium) **D Van Roost**	**6**	**6**
(Japan) M Endo	3	4

Final
(United States) M Werdel-Witmeyer	3	3
(Belgium) **D Van Roost**	**6**	**6**
