= 2026 Hobart International =

- Date: 12–17 January 2026
- Edition: 31st
- Category: WTA 250
- Draw: 32S / 16D
- Prize money: $283,347
- Surface: Hard
- Location: Hobart, Australia
- Venue: Hobart International Tennis Centre

Champions

Singles
- (Italy) Elisabetta Cocciaretto

Doubles
- (Poland) Katarzyna Piter / (Indonesia) Janice Tjen
- Hobart International

The 2026 Hobart International was a professional women's tennis tournament played on outdoor hard courts. It was the 31st edition of the Hobart International and part of the WTA 250 tournaments of the 2026 WTA Tour. It took place at the Hobart International Tennis Centre in Hobart, Australia from 12 to 17 January 2026.

== Champions ==
=== Singles ===
- (Italy) Elisabetta Cocciaretto def. (United States) Iva Jovic, 6–4, 6–4

=== Doubles ===
- (Poland) Katarzyna Piter / (Indonesia) Janice Tjen def. (Belgium) Magali Kempen / (Czech Republic) Anna Sisková, 6–2, 6–2

== Singles main draw entrants ==
^{†}	Runner-up

=== Seeds ===
Country	Player	Rank^{1}	Seed
GBR	Emma Raducanu	29	1
USA	McCartney Kessler	31	2
USA	Iva Jovic^{†}	35	3
USA	Ann Li	37	4
ESP	Jéssica Bouzas Maneiro	42	5
GER	Tatjana Maria	43	6
COL	Emiliana Arango	49	7
POL	Magda Linette	52	8

- ^{1} Rankings as of 5 January 2026.

=== Other entrants ===
The following players received wildcards into the singles main draw:

- (Australia) Talia Gibson
- (Colombia) Camila Osorio
- (Australia) Taylah Preston
- (United States) Venus Williams

The following players received entry from the qualifying draw:

- (Italy) Elisabetta Cocciaretto
- (United States) Caty McNally
- Oksana Selekhmeteva
- (Japan) Ayano Shimizu
- (United States) Katie Volynets
- (Mexico) Renata Zarazúa

The following player received entry as a lucky loser:

- (Germany) Ella Seidel

=== Withdrawals ===
- (United Kingdom) Sonay Kartal → replaced by (Slovakia) Rebecca Šramková
- (Germany) Eva Lys → replaced by (Hungary) Anna Bondár
- (Belgium) Elise Mertens → replaced by (Germany) Ella Seidel (LL)

== Doubles main draw entrants ==
=== Seeds ===
Country	Player	Country	Player	Rank^{1}	Seed
SVK	Tereza Mihalíková	GBR	Olivia Nicholls	54	1
TPE	Chan Hao-ching	CHN	Jiang Xinyu	65	2
JPN	Eri Hozumi	TPE	Wu Fang-hsien	73	3
CHN	Xu Yifan	CHN	Yang Zhaoxuan	84	4

- ^{1} Rankings as of 5 January 2026.

=== Other entrants ===
The following pairs received wildcards into the doubles main draw:

- (Australia) Gabriella Da Silva-Fick / (Australia) Alexandra Osborne
- (Australia) Talia Gibson / (Australia) Taylah Preston

The following pair received entry as alternates:

- (Japan) Ayano Shimizu / (Japan) Momoko Kobori

=== Withdrawals ===
- (Spain) Jéssica Bouzas Maneiro / (Italy) Elisabetta Cocciaretto → replaced by (Japan) Ayano Shimizu / (Japan) Momoko Kobori (Alt)
