= 2019 Hobart International – Doubles =

Doubles
- 2019 Hobart International

Final
- Champions: (Chinese Taipei) Chan Hao-ching (Chinese Taipei) Latisha Chan
- Runners-up: (Belgium) Kirsten Flipkens (Sweden) Johanna Larsson
- Score: 6–3, 3–6, [10–6]

Events
| Singles | Doubles |
| ← 2018 · | Hobart International | · 2020 → |

Elise Mertens and Demi Schuurs were the defending champions, but Mertens chose not to participate and Schuurs chose to compete in Sydney instead.

Chan Hao-ching and Latisha Chan won the title, defeating Kirsten Flipkens and Johanna Larsson in the final, 6–3, 3–6, [10–6].

== Seeds ==
1. (Chinese Taipei) Chan Hao-ching / (Chinese Taipei) Latisha Chan (champions)
2. (Romania) Irina-Camelia Begu / (Romania) Mihaela Buzărnescu (quarterfinals)
3. (Romania) Monica Niculescu / (China) Yang Zhaoxuan (semifinals)
4. (Belgium) Kirsten Flipkens / (Sweden) Johanna Larsson (final)

== Draw ==
=== Key ===
- Q = Qualifier
- WC = Wild card
- LL = Lucky loser
- Alt = Alternate
- SE = Special exempt
- PR = Protected ranking
- ITF = ITF entry
- JE = Junior exempt
- w/o = Walkover
- r = Retired
- d = Defaulted
- SR = Special ranking

=== Draw ===
First round
1 | (Chinese Taipei) H-c Chan (Chinese Taipei) L Chan | 6 | 7
(Australia) M Adamczak (Australia) J Moore | 4 | 5
(Belarus) V Lapko (New Zealand) E Routliffe | 7 | 0 | [11]
(Slovenia) D Jakupović (United States) S Santamaria | 5 | 6 | [13]
3 | (Romania) M Niculescu (China) Z Yang | 6 | 6
(China) X Jiang (China) S Zhang | 4 | 2
(Romania) R Olaru (Kazakhstan) G Voskoboeva | 6 | 6
(Russia) A Panova (Germany) L Siegemund | 4 | 3
WC | (Australia) Z Hives (Australia) E Perez | 3 | 7 | [7]
(Croatia) D Jurak (United States) D Krawczyk | 6 | 5 | [10]
(Spain) L Arruabarrena (Spain) S Sorribes Tormo | 4 | 5
4 | (Belgium) K Flipkens (Sweden) J Larsson | 6 | 7
WC | (Australia) A Bai (Australia) A Poulos | 3 | 2
(Russia) A Potapova (Ukraine) D Yastremska | 6 | 6
(United States) K Christian (Chile) A Guarachi | 6 | 3 | [8]
2 | (Romania) I-C Begu (Romania) M Buzărnescu | 1 | 6 | [10]

Quarterfinals
1 | (Chinese Taipei) H-c Chan (Chinese Taipei) L Chan | w/o
(Slovenia) D Jakupović (United States) S Santamaria
3 | (Romania) M Niculescu (China) Z Yang | 6 | 6
(Romania) R Olaru (Kazakhstan) G Voskoboeva | 1 | 4
(Croatia) D Jurak (United States) D Krawczyk | 1 | 4
4 | (Belgium) K Flipkens (Sweden) J Larsson | 6 | 6
(Russia) A Potapova (Ukraine) D Yastremska | 6 | 7^{7}
2 | (Romania) I-C Begu (Romania) M Buzărnescu | 4 | 6^{3}

Semifinals
1 | (Chinese Taipei) H-c Chan (Chinese Taipei) L Chan | 6 | 6
3 | (Romania) M Niculescu (China) Z Yang | 3 | 4
4 | (Belgium) K Flipkens (Sweden) J Larsson | 7 | 6
(Russia) A Potapova (Ukraine) D Yastremska | 5 | 4

Final
1 | (Chinese Taipei) H-c Chan (Chinese Taipei) L Chan | 6 | 3 | [10]
4 | (Belgium) K Flipkens (Sweden) J Larsson | 3 | 6 | [6]
