= 2017 Hobart International – Singles =

Singles
- 2017 Hobart International

Final
- Champion: (Belgium) Elise Mertens
- Runner-up: (Romania) Monica Niculescu
- Score: 6–3, 6–1

Details
- Draw: 32 (4 Q / 3 WC )
- Seeds: 8

Events
Singles	Doubles
← 2016 ·	Hobart International	· 2018 →

Alizé Cornet was the defending champion, but withdrew before the tournament began due to a back injury.

Elise Mertens won her first WTA singles title, defeating Monica Niculescu in the final, 6–3, 6–1. Mertens had come through the qualifying tournament and thus became only the third qualifier to win the Hobart International, following Mona Barthel in 2012 and Garbiñe Muguruza in 2014.

== Seeds ==
1. (Netherlands) Kiki Bertens (quarterfinals)
2. (Latvia) Anastasija Sevastova (first round)
3. (Romania) Monica Niculescu (final)
4. (United States) Alison Riske (withdrew)
5. (Japan) Misaki Doi (first round)
6. (France) Alizé Cornet (withdrew)
7. (France) Kristina Mladenovic (first round)
8. (Croatia) Ana Konjuh (withdrew)
9. (Japan) Naomi Osaka (withdrew)
10. (Italy) Sara Errani (withdrew)
11. (Sweden) Johanna Larsson (second round)

== Draw ==
=== Finals ===
Semifinals
Q	(Belgium) Elise Mertens	6	6
Q	(Croatia) Jana Fett	4	0
3	(Romania) Monica Niculescu	w/o
(Ukraine) Lesia Tsurenko

Final
Q	(Belgium) Elise Mertens	6	6
3	(Romania) Monica Niculescu	3	1

=== Top half ===
First round
1	(Netherlands) K Bertens	6	6
(Germany) A Beck	1	2
PR	(Kazakhstan) G Voskoboeva	6	6
(France) P Parmentier	4	3
Q	(Brazil) T Pereira	3	6^{5}
LL	(United States) S Vickery	6	7^{7}
Q	(Belgium) E Mertens	6	6
7	(France) K Mladenovic	1	2
5	(Japan) M Doi	4	7	5
WC	(Australia) L Cabrera	6	5	7
WC	(Italy) F Schiavone	3	2
Q	(Croatia) J Fett	6	6
LL	(Netherlands) C Burger	0	6	3
LL	(Paraguay) V Cepede Royg	6	3	6
(Germany) A Petkovic	6	6
LL	(United States) N Gibbs	4	0

Second round
1	(Netherlands) K Bertens	6	6
PR	(Kazakhstan) G Voskoboeva	1	4
LL	(United States) S Vickery	1^{r}
Q	(Belgium) E Mertens	0
WC	(Australia) L Cabrera	1	3
Q	(Croatia) J Fett	6	6
LL	(Paraguay) V Cepede Royg	6	0	6
(Germany) A Petkovic	3	6	4

Quarterfinals
1	(Netherlands) K Bertens	2	5
Q	(Belgium) E Mertens	6	7
Q	(Croatia) J Fett	6	6
LL	(Paraguay) V Cepede Royg	1	4

Semifinals
Q	(Belgium) E Mertens	6	6
Q	(Croatia) J Fett	4	0

=== Bottom half ===
First round
LL	(Japan) K Nara	6	5	3
Q	(Japan) R Ozaki	0	7	6
(Switzerland) V Golubic	3	4
(Czech Republic) L Šafářová	6	6
(Belgium) K Flipkens	7^{12}	6
WC	(Australia) J Fourlis	6^{10}	4
(Serbia) J Janković	2	3
3	(Romania) M Niculescu	6	6
11	(Sweden) J Larsson	6^{5}	6	6
(Czech Republic) Kr Plíšková	7^{7}	3	1
(Ukraine) L Tsurenko	6	6
LL	(Spain) S Soler Espinosa	2	3
(Spain) L Arruabarrena	4	6	6
LL	(Luxembourg) M Minella	6	2	3
(United States) S Rogers	6	1	6
2	(Latvia) A Sevastova	2	6	4

Second round
Q	(Japan) R Ozaki	2	6	7
(Czech Republic) L Šafářová	6	3	5
(Belgium) K Flipkens	3	2
3	(Romania) M Niculescu	6	6
11	(Sweden) J Larsson	4	4
(Ukraine) L Tsurenko	6	6
(Spain) L Arruabarrena	2	2
(United States) S Rogers	6	6

Quarterfinals
Q	(Japan) R Ozaki	4	4
3	(Romania) M Niculescu	6	6
(Ukraine) L Tsurenko	4	6	6
(United States) S Rogers	6	4	3

Semifinals
3	(Romania) M Niculescu	w/o
(Ukraine) L Tsurenko

== Qualifying ==
=== Seeds ===
1. (Japan) Kurumi Nara (first round, lucky loser)
2. (Turkey) Çağla Büyükakçay (first round)
3. (Chinese Taipei) Hsieh Su-wei (withdrew)
4. (United States) Nicole Gibbs (second round, lucky loser)
5. (Japan) Nao Hibino (first round)
6. (Japan) Risa Ozaki (qualified)
7. (Luxembourg) Mandy Minella (qualifying competition, lucky loser)
8. (Spain) Sara Sorribes Tormo (first round)

=== Qualifiers ===
1. (Belgium) Elise Mertens
2. (Croatia) Jana Fett
3. (Brazil) Teliana Pereira
4. (Japan) Risa Ozaki

=== Lucky losers ===
1. (Luxembourg) Mandy Minella
2. (Paraguay) Verónica Cepede Royg
3. (United States) Sachia Vickery
4. (Spain) Sílvia Soler Espinosa
5. (Netherlands) Cindy Burger
6. (United States) Nicole Gibbs
7. (Japan) Kurumi Nara

=== Draw ===
==== First qualifier ====
First round
1	(Japan) Kurumi Nara	6	5	4
WC	(Australia) Olivia Rogowska	4	7	6
(United States) Sachia Vickery	6	6
(Belarus) Aliaksandra Sasnovich	1	0
(Germany) Tatjana Maria	0	3
(Hungary) Dalma Gálfi	6	6
(Belgium) Elise Mertens	6	6
5	(Japan) Nao Hibino	3	4

Second round
WC	(Australia) Olivia Rogowska	6^{6}	0
(United States) Sachia Vickery	7^{8}	6
(Hungary) Dalma Gálfi	1	1
(Belgium) Elise Mertens	6	6

Qualifying competition
(United States) Sachia Vickery	4	2
(Belgium) Elise Mertens	6	6

==== Second qualifier ====
First round
2	(Turkey) Çağla Büyükakçay	2	6	2
(Spain) Sílvia Soler Espinosa	6	2	6
PR	(Croatia) Jana Fett	6	6
(Czech Republic) Tereza Smitková	0	1
(Russia) Anastasia Pivovarova	7	5	6^{4}
(Austria) Barbara Haas	5	7	7^{7}
(Paraguay) Verónica Cepede Royg	6	6
8	(Spain) Sara Sorribes Tormo	1	2

Second round
(Spain) Sílvia Soler Espinosa	3	3
PR	(Croatia) Jana Fett	6	6
(Austria) Barbara Haas	6^{5}	6	3
(Paraguay) Verónica Cepede Royg	7^{7}	2	6

Qualifying competition
PR	(Croatia) Jana Fett	6	1	6
(Paraguay) Verónica Cepede Royg	4	6	4

==== Third qualifier ====
First round
Alt	(Brazil) Teliana Pereira	7	4	6
(Bulgaria) Elitsa Kostova	5	6	3
(Netherlands) Cindy Burger	6	6
(France) Myrtille Georges	3	3
WC	(Australia) Storm Sanders	4	2
(Czech Republic) Tereza Martincová	6	6
(United States) Julia Boserup	7^{7}	2	3
7	(Luxembourg) Mandy Minella	6^{1}	6	6

Second round
Alt	(Brazil) Teliana Pereira	6	6
(Netherlands) Cindy Burger	2	4
(Czech Republic) Tereza Martincová	6^{2}	2
7	(Luxembourg) Mandy Minella	7^{7}	6

Qualifying competition
Alt	(Brazil) Teliana Pereira	7	6
7	(Luxembourg) Mandy Minella	5	0

==== Fourth qualifier ====
First round
4	(United States) Nicole Gibbs	6	6
(Romania) Ana Bogdan	4	2
WC	(Australia) Ashleigh Barty	6	2	6
(South Korea) Jang Su-jeong	3	6	4
(Russia) Ekaterina Alexandrova	6	3	6
(Slovenia) Dalila Jakupović	4	6	4
WC	(Australia) Tammi Patterson	6	6^{8}	1
6	(Japan) Risa Ozaki	3	7^{10}	6

Second round
4	(United States) Nicole Gibbs	6	6^{4}	4
WC	(Australia) Ashleigh Barty	4	7^{7}	6
(Russia) Ekaterina Alexandrova	0	2
6	(Japan) Risa Ozaki	6	6

Qualifying competition
WC	(Australia) Ashleigh Barty
6	(Japan) Risa Ozaki	w/o

== See also ==
- 2017 Australian Open Series
