= 2020 Hobart International – Singles =

Singles
- 2020 Hobart International

Final
- Champion: (Kazakhstan) Elena Rybakina
- Runner-up: (China) Zhang Shuai
- Score: 7–6^{(9–7)}, 6–3

Details
- Draw: 32 (4 Q / 3 WC )
- Seeds: 8

Events
Singles	Doubles
← 2019 ·	Hobart International	· 2023 →

Sofia Kenin was the defending champion, but chose to compete in Adelaide instead.

Elena Rybakina won the title, defeating Zhang Shuai in the final, 7–6^{(9–7)}, 6–3.

== Seeds ==
1. (Belgium) Elise Mertens (quarterfinals)
2. (Spain) Garbiñe Muguruza (quarterfinals, withdrew)
3. (Kazakhstan) Elena Rybakina (champion)
4. (China) Zhang Shuai (final)
5. (Russia) Veronika Kudermetova (semifinals)
6. (Poland) Magda Linette (second round)
7. (Sweden) Rebecca Peterson (first round, retired)
8. (France) Caroline Garcia (first round)

== Draw ==
=== Finals ===
Semifinals
Q	(United Kingdom) Heather Watson	3	6	4
3	(Kazakhstan) Elena Rybakina	6	4	6
4	(China) Zhang Shuai	6	6
5	(Russia) Veronika Kudermetova	3	4

Final
3	(Kazakhstan) Elena Rybakina	7^{9}	6
4	(China) Zhang Shuai	6^{7}	3

=== Top half ===
First round
1	(Belgium) E Mertens	6	6
Q	(United States) C McHale	1	1
(China) L Zhu	7	2	6^{3}
(Slovakia) V Kužmová	5	6	7^{7}
(Switzerland) J Teichmann	6	4	4
Q	(United Kingdom) H Watson	1	6	6
(France) F Ferro	4
7	(Sweden) R Peterson	4^{r}
3	(Kazakhstan) E Rybakina	6	6
(Slovenia) T Zidanšek	1	4
(Belgium) A Van Uytvanck	5	6	2
(France) A Cornet	7	1	6
LL	(Serbia) N Stojanović	6	4	3
(Czech Republic) Kr Plíšková	1	6	6
WC	(Australia) L Cabrera	4	6	6
8	(France) C Garcia	6	4	2

Second round
1	(Belgium) E Mertens	6	6
(Slovakia) V Kužmová	1	0
Q	(United Kingdom) H Watson	7^{7}	6
(France) F Ferro	6^{5}	3
3	(Kazakhstan) E Rybakina	7	6
(France) A Cornet	5	3
(Czech Republic) Kr Plíšková	6	4	4
WC	(Australia) L Cabrera	4	6	6

Quarterfinals
1	(Belgium) E Mertens	7^{7}	4	5
Q	(United Kingdom) H Watson	6^{5}	6	7
3	(Kazakhstan) E Rybakina	6^{4}	7^{7}	7
WC	(Australia) L Cabrera	7^{7}	6^{2}	5

Semifinals
Q	(United Kingdom) H Watson	3	6	4
3	(Kazakhstan) E Rybakina	6	4	6

=== Bottom half ===
First round
6	(Poland) M Linette	7^{7}	7^{11}
(Russia) S Kuznetsova	6^{2}	6^{9}
WC	(Australia) A Sharma	3	6	6^{6}
(United States) L Davis	6	3	7^{8}
Q	(Ukraine) K Kozlova	6	6
Q	(Spain) S Sorribes Tormo	2	1
(Belgium) K Flipkens	6	3	2
4	(China) S Zhang	4	6	6
5	(Russia) V Kudermetova	6	6
WC	(Australia) S Stosur	2	2
PR	(United States) C Bellis	3	7^{7}	6
(Czech Republic) M Bouzková	6	6^{4}	3
(Russia) A Blinkova	4	1
Q	(Tunisia) O Jabeur	6	6
(China) Y Wang	1	5
2/WC	(Spain) G Muguruza	6	7

Second round
6	(Poland) M Linette	4	4
(United States) L Davis	6	6
Q	(Ukraine) K Kozlova	6	1	2
4	(China) S Zhang	4	6	6
5	(Russia) V Kudermetova	7^{8}	6
PR	(United States) C Bellis	6^{6}	1
Q	(Tunisia) O Jabeur	6	3	6^{4}
2/WC	(Spain) G Muguruza	3	6	7^{7}

Quarterfinals
(United States) L Davis	1	4
4	(China) S Zhang	6	6
5	(Russia) V Kudermetova	w/o
2/WC	(Spain) G Muguruza

Semifinals
4	(China) S Zhang	6	6
5	(Russia) V Kudermetova	3	4

== Qualifying ==
=== Seeds ===
1. (Romania) ~~Sorana Cîrstea~~ (qualified, withdrew)
2. (Tunisia) Ons Jabeur (qualified)
3. (Serbia) Nina Stojanović (qualifying competition; lucky loser)
4. (United States) Christina McHale (qualified)
5. (Ukraine) Kateryna Kozlova (qualified)
6. (Spain) Sara Sorribes Tormo (qualified)
7. (Netherlands) Arantxa Rus (qualifying competition)
8. (United States) Kristie Ahn (qualifying competition)
9. (United States) Madison Brengle (qualifying competition)
10. (Italy) Camila Giorgi (qualifying competition)
11. (Romania) Irina-Camelia Begu (qualifying competition)
12. (United Kingdom) Heather Watson (qualified)

=== Qualifiers ===
1. (Romania) ~~Sorana Cîrstea~~
2. (Tunisia) Ons Jabeur
3. (United Kingdom) Heather Watson
4. (United States) Christina McHale
5. (Ukraine) Kateryna Kozlova
6. (Spain) Sara Sorribes Tormo

=== Lucky loser ===
1. (Serbia) Nina Stojanović

=== Qualifying draw ===
==== First qualifier ====
First round
1	(Romania) Sorana Cîrstea	6	6
(Australia) Gabriella Da Silva-Fick	1	0
(United States) Jennifer Elie	6	6^{4}	3
11	(Romania) Irina-Camelia Begu	4	7^{7}	6

Qualifying competition
1	(Romania) Sorana Cîrstea	6	7^{11}
11	(Romania) Irina-Camelia Begu	2	6^{9}

==== Second qualifier ====
First round
2	(Tunisia) Ons Jabeur	6	6
(Japan) Makoto Ninomiya	2	1
WC	(Australia) Alexandra Bozovic	2	4
9	(United States) Madison Brengle	6	6

Qualifying competition
2	(Tunisia) Ons Jabeur	7^{7}	6
9	(United States) Madison Brengle	6^{5}	2

==== Third qualifier ====
First round
3	(Serbia) Nina Stojanović	7^{8}	6
(Slovakia) Anna Karolína Schmiedlová	6^{6}	1
(United States) Hayley Carter	0	2
12	(United Kingdom) Heather Watson	6	6

Qualifying competition
3	(Serbia) Nina Stojanović	4	3
12	(United Kingdom) Heather Watson	6	6

==== Fourth qualifier ====
First round
4	(United States) Christina McHale	6	6
WC	(Czech Republic) Renata Voráčová	0	2
(United States) Alexa Glatch	3	1
7	(Netherlands) Arantxa Rus	6	6

Qualifying competition
4	(United States) Christina McHale	6	4	6
7	(Netherlands) Arantxa Rus	4	6	3

==== Fifth qualifier ====
First round
5	(Ukraine) Kateryna Kozlova	6	6
WC	(Australia) Jessica Fowler	0	2
(Spain) Georgina García Pérez	3	3
10	(Italy) Camila Giorgi	6	6

Qualifying competition
5	(Ukraine) Kateryna Kozlova	6	6
10	(Italy) Camila Giorgi	2	2

==== Sixth qualifier ====
First round
6	(Spain) Sara Sorribes Tormo	6	6
WC	(Australia) Isabella Bozicevic	0	3
WC	(Australia) Mia Repac	2	2
8	(United States) Kristie Ahn	6	6

Qualifying competition
6	(Spain) Sara Sorribes Tormo	6	7
8	(United States) Kristie Ahn	4	5
