= 2018 Hobart International – Singles =

Singles
- 2018 Hobart International

Final
- Champion: (Belgium) Elise Mertens
- Runner-up: (Romania) Mihaela Buzărnescu
- Score: 6–1, 4–6, 6–3

Details
- Draw: 32 (6 Q / 3 WC )
- Seeds: 8

Events
Singles	Doubles
← 2017 ·	Hobart International	· 2019 →

Elise Mertens was the defending champion heading into the tournament. She successfully defended the title after defeating unseeded Romanian, Mihaela Buzărnescu in the final, 6–1, 4–6, 6–3 to become the first two-time champion at the Hobart International. The final saw four separate rain delays, lasting eight hours.

== Seeds ==
1. (China) Zhang Shuai (second round)
2. (Belgium) Elise Mertens (champion)
3. (Romania) Sorana Cîrstea (first round)
4. (France) Alizé Cornet (first round)
5. (Ukraine) Lesia Tsurenko (semifinals)
6. (Romania) Irina-Camelia Begu (first round)
7. (Germany) Tatjana Maria (first round)
8. (Czech Republic) Kateřina Siniaková (first round)

== Draw ==
=== Finals ===
Semifinals
5	(Ukraine) Lesia Tsurenko	2	2
(Romania) Mihaela Buzărnescu	6	6
Q	(United Kingdom) Heather Watson	4	6	2
2	(Belgium) Elise Mertens	6	1	6

Final
(Romania) Mihaela Buzărnescu	1	6	3
2	(Belgium) Elise Mertens	6	4	6

=== Top half ===
First round
1	(China) S Zhang	7	6
(Poland) M Linette	5	3
WC	(Canada) E Bouchard	4	3
(Belarus) A Sabalenka	6	6
(Kazakhstan) Y Putintseva	6	6
(Japan) N Osaka	3	3
(Hungary) T Babos	6^{2}	2
5	(Ukraine) L Tsurenko	7^{7}	6
4	(France) A Cornet	2	4
(Romania) M Buzărnescu	6	6
Q	(Belgium) A Van Uytvanck	6	6^{4}	4
PR	(Germany) A-L Friedsam	4	7^{7}	6
Q	(Belgium) K Flipkens	5	7	6
(Czech Republic) Kr Plíšková	7	5	3
(United States) A Riske	2	6	7
8	(Czech Republic) K Siniaková	6	3	5

Second round
1	(China) S Zhang	6^{3}	4
(Belarus) A Sabalenka	7^{7}	6
(Kazakhstan) Y Putintseva	3	2
5	(Ukraine) L Tsurenko	6	6
(Romania) M Buzărnescu	7	6
PR	(Germany) A-L Friedsam	5	4
Q	(Belgium) K Flipkens
(United States) A Riske	w/o

Quarterfinals
(Belarus) A Sabalenka	1	1
5	(Ukraine) L Tsurenko	6	6
(Romania) M Buzărnescu	7^{7}	6
(United States) A Riske	6^{5}	1

Semifinals
5	(Ukraine) L Tsurenko	2	2
(Romania) M Buzărnescu	6	6

=== Bottom half ===
First round
7	(Germany) T Maria	4	2
(Croatia) D Vekić	6	6
(Czech Republic) M Vondroušová	6	6
(Russia) N Vikhlyantseva	4	3
WC	(Australia) J Fourlis	7	7^{11}
Q	(Serbia) N Stojanović	5	6^{9}
Q	(United Kingdom) H Watson	7	6
3	(Romania) S Cîrstea	5	3
6	(Romania) I-C Begu	3	2
Q	(Romania) M Niculescu	6	6
(United States) V Lepchenko	6	7^{7}
(Germany) M Barthel	0	6^{4}
(Brazil) B Haddad Maia	6	6
WC	(Australia) L Cabrera	3	2
Q	(Japan) K Nara	0	4
2	(Belgium) E Mertens	6	6

Second round
(Croatia) D Vekić	6	6
(Czech Republic) M Vondroušová	4	4
WC	(Australia) J Fourlis	2	2
Q	(United Kingdom) H Watson	6	6
Q	(Romania) M Niculescu	6	6
(United States) V Lepchenko	4	2
(Brazil) B Haddad Maia	4	4
2	(Belgium) E Mertens	6	6

Quarterfinals
(Croatia) D Vekić	0	4
Q	(United Kingdom) H Watson	6	6
Q	(Romania) M Niculescu
2	(Belgium) E Mertens	w/o

Semifinals
Q	(United Kingdom) H Watson	4	6	2
2	(Belgium) E Mertens	6	1	6

== Qualifying ==
=== Seeds ===
1. (United Kingdom) Heather Watson (qualified)
2. (Belgium) Kirsten Flipkens (qualified)
3. (Belgium) Alison Van Uytvanck (qualified)
4. (Romania) Monica Niculescu (qualified)
5. (France) Pauline Parmentier (first round)
6. (United States) Madison Brengle (qualifying competition)
7. (Japan) Nao Hibino (qualifying competition)
8. (Japan) Kurumi Nara (qualified)
9. (Croatia) Jana Fett (first round)
10. (Romania) Ana Bogdan (first round)
11. (Netherlands) Richèl Hogenkamp (first round)
12. (Colombia) Mariana Duque Mariño (first round)

=== Qualifiers ===
1. (United Kingdom) Heather Watson
2. (Belgium) Kirsten Flipkens
3. (Belgium) Alison Van Uytvanck
4. (Romania) Monica Niculescu
5. (Serbia) Nina Stojanović
6. (Japan) Kurumi Nara

=== Qualifying draw ===
==== First qualifier ====
First round
1	(United Kingdom) Heather Watson	6	6
(Australia) Kimberly Birrell	3	2
(United States) Jennifer Elie	4	7^{7}	3
7	(Japan) Nao Hibino	6	6^{4}	6

Qualifying competition
1	(United Kingdom) Heather Watson	4	7	6
7	(Japan) Nao Hibino	6	5	3

==== Second qualifier ====
First round
2	(Belgium) Kirsten Flipkens	6^{4}	6	6
WC	(Australia) Masa Jovanovic	7^{7}	1	0
(Australia) Naiktha Bains	7^{7}	7^{8}
10	(Romania) Ana Bogdan	6^{4}	6^{6}

Qualifying competition
2	(Belgium) Kirsten Flipkens	6	6
(Australia) Naiktha Bains	4	2

==== Third qualifier ====
First round
3	(Belgium) Alison Van Uytvanck	6	7
WC	(Australia) Jessica Moore	3	5
(Slovakia) Jana Čepelová	4	6	6
9	(Croatia) Jana Fett	6	0	4

Qualifying competition
3	(Belgium) Alison Van Uytvanck	6	4	7
(Slovakia) Jana Čepelová	3	6	5

==== Fourth qualifier ====
First round
4	(Romania) Monica Niculescu	6	6
WC	(Australia) Alison Bai	2	0
(Russia) Alla Kudryavtseva	7^{7}	6
11	(Netherlands) Richèl Hogenkamp	6^{2}	3

Qualifying competition
4	(Romania) Monica Niculescu	6	6
(Russia) Alla Kudryavtseva	0	4

==== Fifth qualifier ====
First round
5	(France) Pauline Parmentier	2	1
(Israel) Julia Glushko	6	6
(Serbia) Nina Stojanović	6	6
12	(Colombia) Mariana Duque Mariño	4	1

Qualifying competition
(Israel) Julia Glushko	1	4
(Serbia) Nina Stojanović	6	6

==== Sixth qualifier ====
First round
6	(United States) Madison Brengle	6	6
(Russia) Veronika Kudermetova	3	4
WC	(Australia) Astra Sharma	0	1
8	(Japan) Kurumi Nara	6	6

Qualifying competition
6	(United States) Madison Brengle	3	4
8	(Japan) Kurumi Nara	6	6
