= 2017 Hobart International – Doubles =

Doubles
- 2017 Hobart International

Final
- Champions: (Romania) Raluca Olaru (Ukraine) Olga Savchuk
- Runners-up: (Canada) Gabriela Dabrowski (China) Yang Zhaoxuan
- Score: 0–6, 6–4, [10–5]

Events
Singles	Doubles
← 2016 ·	Hobart International	· 2018 →

Han Xinyun and Christina McHale were the defending champions, but chose not to participate this year.

Raluca Olaru and Olga Savchuk won the title, defeating Gabriela Dabrowski and Yang Zhaoxuan in the final, 0–6, 6–4, [10–5].

== Seeds ==
1. (Romania) Monica Niculescu / (United States) Abigail Spears (quarterfinals, withdrew)
2. (Netherlands) Kiki Bertens / (Sweden) Johanna Larsson (first round)
3. (Canada) Gabriela Dabrowski / (China) Yang Zhaoxuan (final)
4. (Argentina) María Irigoyen / (China) Liang Chen (first round)

== Draw ==
=== Key ===
- Q = Qualifier
- WC = Wild card
- LL = Lucky loser
- Alt = Alternate
- SE = Special exempt
- PR = Protected ranking
- ITF = ITF entry
- JE = Junior exempt
- w/o = Walkover
- r = Retired
- d = Defaulted
- SR = Special ranking

First round
1	(Romania) M Niculescu (United States) A Spears	6	6
(Japan) N Hibino (Poland) A Rosolska	3	4
(Netherlands) D Schuurs (Czech Republic) R Voráčová	6	6
WC	(France) P Parmentier (Italy) F Schiavone	4	4
3	(Canada) G Dabrowski (China) Z Yang	6	7
(Chinese Taipei) C-j Chuang (United States) N Gibbs	0	5
Alt	(Australia) J Moore (Thailand) Vara Wongteanchai	2	1
(United States) N Melichar (Japan) M Ninomiya	6	6
(Italy) S Errani (Belgium) K Flipkens	6	6
(United Kingdom) J Rae (United Kingdom) A Smith	2	0
(Luxembourg) M Minella (Latvia) A Sevastova	6	6
4	(Argentina) M Irigoyen (China) C Liang	1	1
(Ukraine) L Kichenok (Ukraine) N Kichenok	6	6
WC	(Australia) A Bai (Australia) L Cabrera	4	3
(Romania) R Olaru (Ukraine) O Savchuk	6	6
2	(Netherlands) K Bertens (Sweden) J Larsson	4	2

Quarterfinals
1	(Romania) M Niculescu (United States) A Spears
(Netherlands) D Schuurs (Czech Republic) R Voráčová	w/o
3	(Canada) G Dabrowski (China) Z Yang	4	7	[10]
(United States) N Melichar (Japan) M Ninomiya	6	5	[4]
(Italy) S Errani (Belgium) K Flipkens
(Luxembourg) M Minella (Latvia) A Sevastova	w/o
(Ukraine) L Kichenok (Ukraine) N Kichenok
(Romania) R Olaru (Ukraine) O Savchuk	w/o

Semifinals
(Netherlands) D Schuurs (Czech Republic) R Voráčová	6	1	[3]
3	(Canada) G Dabrowski (China) Z Yang	4	6	[10]
(Luxembourg) M Minella (Latvia) A Sevastova	4	2
(Romania) R Olaru (Ukraine) O Savchuk	6	6

Final
3	(Canada) G Dabrowski (China) Z Yang	6	4	[5]
(Romania) R Olaru (Ukraine) O Savchuk	0	6	[10]
