= 2018 Hobart International – Doubles =

Doubles
- 2018 Hobart International

Final
- Champions: (Belgium) Elise Mertens (Netherlands) Demi Schuurs
- Runners-up: (Ukraine) Lyudmyla Kichenok (Japan) Makoto Ninomiya
- Score: 6–2, 6–2

Events
Singles	Doubles
← 2017 ·	Hobart International	· 2019 →

Raluca Olaru and Olga Savchuk were the defending champions, but lost in the quarterfinals to Veronika Kudermetova and Aryna Sabalenka.

Elise Mertens and Demi Schuurs won the title, defeating Lyudmyla Kichenok and Makoto Ninomiya in the final, 6–2, 6–2.

== Seeds ==
1. (Romania) Raluca Olaru / (Ukraine) Olga Savchuk (quarterfinals)
2. (Belgium) Kirsten Flipkens / (United States) Nicole Melichar (quarterfinals, withdrew)
3. (Belgium) Elise Mertens / (Netherlands) Demi Schuurs (champions)
4. (Ukraine) Lyudmyla Kichenok / (Japan) Makoto Ninomiya (final)

== Draw ==
=== Key ===
- Q = Qualifier
- WC = Wild card
- LL = Lucky loser
- Alt = Alternate
- SE = Special exempt
- PR = Protected ranking
- ITF = ITF entry
- JE = Junior exempt
- w/o = Walkover
- r = Retired
- d = Defaulted
- SR = Special ranking

=== Draw ===
First round
1	(Romania) R Olaru (Ukraine) O Savchuk	6	2	[10]
(Romania) M Buzărnescu (Argentina) M Irigoyen	4	6	[5]
(Russia) V Kudermetova (Belarus) A Sabalenka	6	5	[10]
(Russia) N Dzalamidze (Switzerland) X Knoll	1	7	[6]
3	(Belgium) E Mertens (Netherlands) D Schuurs	6	6
(Germany) M Barthel (Poland) M Linette	2	4
(Colombia) M Duque Mariño (Georgia (country)) O Kalashnikova	3	0
PR	(Germany) A-L Friedsam (Belgium) A Van Uytvanck	6	6
(Belarus) L Marozava (Serbia) N Stojanović	3	1
(Japan) N Hibino (Croatia) D Jurak	6	6
(United States) K Christian (India) P Thombare	2	5
4	(Ukraine) L Kichenok (Japan) M Ninomiya	6	7
(Netherlands) M Krajicek (Russia) A Kudryavtseva	7^{7}	2	[9]
WC	(Australia) A Bai (Australia) L Cabrera	6^{3}	6	[11]
WC	(Australia) J Fourlis (Australia) J Moore	3	6^{6}
2	(Belgium) K Flipkens (United States) N Melichar	6	7^{8}

Quarterfinals
1	(Romania) R Olaru (Ukraine) O Savchuk	1	5
(Russia) V Kudermetova (Belarus) A Sabalenka	6	7
3	(Belgium) E Mertens (Netherlands) D Schuurs	6^{4}	6	[10]
PR	(Germany) A-L Friedsam (Belgium) A Van Uytvanck	7^{7}	2	[8]
(Japan) N Hibino (Croatia) D Jurak	1	4
4	(Ukraine) L Kichenok (Japan) M Ninomiya	6	6
WC	(Australia) A Bai (Australia) L Cabrera	w/o
2	(Belgium) K Flipkens (United States) N Melichar

Semifinals
(Russia) V Kudermetova (Belarus) A Sabalenka	0	7	[7]
3	(Belgium) E Mertens (Netherlands) D Schuurs	6	5	[10]
4	(Ukraine) L Kichenok (Japan) M Ninomiya	3	6	[10]
WC	(Australia) A Bai (Australia) L Cabrera	6	3	[4]

Final
3	(Belgium) E Mertens (Netherlands) D Schuurs	6	6
4	(Ukraine) L Kichenok (Japan) M Ninomiya	2	2
