= 2026 Hobart International – Singles =

Singles
- 2026 Hobart International

Final
- Champion: (Italy) Elisabetta Cocciaretto
- Runner-up: (United States) Iva Jovic
- Score: 6–4, 6–4

Details
- Draw: 32 (6 Q / 3 WC )
- Seeds: 8

Events
Singles	Doubles
- Hobart International

Elisabetta Cocciaretto defeated Iva Jovic in the final, 6–4, 6–4 to win the singles tennis title at the 2026 Hobart International. It was her second WTA Tour title, and her first since 2023. Cocciaretto was the fifth qualifier to win the tournament.

McCartney Kessler was the defending champion, but lost in the first round to Olga Danilović.

The first-round match between Venus Williams (aged 45 years, 7 months) and Tatjana Maria (aged 38 years, 5 months) was the oldest match by combined age (84 years, 1 day) in WTA Tour history.

== Seeds ==
1. (United Kingdom) Emma Raducanu (quarterfinals)
2. (United States) McCartney Kessler (first round)
3. (United States) Iva Jovic (final)
4. (United States) Ann Li (second round)
5. (Spain) Jéssica Bouzas Maneiro (first round)
6. (Germany) Tatjana Maria (second round)
7. (Colombia) Emiliana Arango (first round)
8. (Poland) Magda Linette (quarterfinals)

== Draw ==
Key

- Q = Qualifier
- WC = Wild card
- LL = Lucky loser
- Alt = Alternate
- ITF = ITF entry
- PR = Protected ranking
- SR = Special ranking
- SE = Special exempt
- JE = Junior exempt
- JR = Junior Accelerator Programme entrant
- CO = College Accelerator Programme entrant
- NG = Next Gen Accelerator Program entrant
- w/o = Walkover
- r = Retired
- d = Defaulted

=== Finals ===
Semifinals
WC	(Australia) Taylah Preston	6	4	1
3	(United States) Iva Jovic	4	6	6
Q	(Italy) Elisabetta Cocciaretto	6	6
(Croatia) Antonia Ružić	3	2

Final
3	(United States) Iva Jovic	4	4
Q	(Italy) Elisabetta Cocciaretto	6	6

=== Top half ===
First round
1	(United Kingdom) E Raducanu	6	7^{7}
WC	(Colombia) C Osorio	3	6^{2}
(France) E Jacquemot	4	0
(Poland) M Fręch	6	6
(Slovakia) R Šramková	6	4	6
(France) V Gracheva	4	6	2
WC	(Australia) T Preston	6	7^{7}
5	(Spain) J Bouzas Maneiro	4	6^{4}
3	(United States) I Jovic	6	6
(Indonesia) J Tjen	0	1
Q	(Mexico) R Zarazúa	6^{5}	6	6
(United States) H Baptiste	7^{7}	3	3
(China) Xin Wang	6	6
WC	(Australia) T Gibson	2	3
Q	O Selekhmeteva	3	6	1
8	(Poland) M Linette	6	1	6

Second round
1	(United Kingdom) E Raducanu	w/o
(Poland) M Fręch
(Slovakia) R Šramková	4	1
WC	(Australia) T Preston	6	6
3	(United States) I Jovic	6	6
Q	(Mexico) R Zarazúa	1	2
(China) Xin Wang	1	5
8	(Poland) M Linette	6	7

Quarterfinals
1	(United Kingdom) E Raducanu	2	4
WC	(Australia) T Preston	6	6
3	(United States) I Jovic	6	6^{5}	6
8	(Poland) M Linette	3	7^{7}	2

Semifinals
WC	(Australia) T Preston	6	4	1
3	(United States) I Jovic	4	6	6

=== Bottom half ===
First round
6	(Germany) T Maria	6	6
WC	(United States) V Williams	4	3
(Hungary) A Bondár	6	6
LL	(Germany) E Seidel	0	1
Q	(Japan) A Shimizu	3	4
Q	(Italy) E Cocciaretto	6	6
Q	(United States) K Volynets	6	5	2
4	(United States) A Li	4	7	6
7	(Colombia) E Arango	5	1
(Croatia) A Ružić	7	6
Q	(United States) C McNally	6	4	1
(Argentina) S Sierra	1	6	6
(United States) P Stearns	6	1	7^{7}
(Czech Republic) B Krejčíková	4	6	6^{4}
(Serbia) O Danilović	4	6	6
2	(United States) M Kessler	6	4	4

Second round
6	(Germany) T Maria	6^{7}	5
(Hungary) A Bondár	7^{9}	7
Q	(Italy) E Cocciaretto	1	7	7
4	(United States) A Li	6	5	5
(Croatia) A Ružić	7	6
(Argentina) S Sierra	5	4
(United States) P Stearns	6^{2}	1
(Serbia) O Danilović	7^{7}	6

Quarterfinals
(Hungary) A Bondár	2	2
Q	(Italy) E Cocciaretto	6	6
(Croatia) A Ružić	6	6
(Serbia) O Danilović	3	3

Semifinals
Q	(Italy) E Cocciaretto	6	6
(Croatia) A Ružić	3	2

== Qualifying ==
=== Seeds ===
1. (France) Varvara Gracheva (moved to main draw)
2. (Mexico) Renata Zarazúa (qualified)
3. (Switzerland) Viktorija Golubic (first round)
4. (Italy) Elisabetta Cocciaretto (qualified)
5. (Croatia) Petra Marčinko (qualifying competition)
6. (United States) Caty McNally (qualified)
7. (Germany) Ella Seidel (qualifying competition, lucky loser)
8. (Hungary) Panna Udvardy (first round)
9. (Switzerland) Simona Waltert (qualifying competition)
10. (Japan) Moyuka Uchijima (first round)
11. (Austria) Julia Grabher (qualifying competition)
12. (Czech Republic) Sára Bejlek (withdrew)

=== Qualifiers ===
1. (United States) Katie Volynets
2. (Mexico) Renata Zarazúa
3. (Japan) Ayano Shimizu
4. (Italy) Elisabetta Cocciaretto
5. Oksana Selekhmeteva
6. (United States) Caty McNally

=== Lucky loser ===
1. (Germany) Ella Seidel

=== Draw ===
==== First qualifier ====
First round
Alt	(United States) Elizabeth Mandlik	2	4
(United States) Katie Volynets	6	6
(Netherlands) Suzan Lamens	6	2	2
7	(Germany) Ella Seidel	4	6	6

Qualifying competition
(United States) Katie Volynets	3	6	6
7	(Germany) Ella Seidel	6	1	4

==== Second qualifier ====
First round
2	(Mexico) Renata Zarazúa	6	6
Alt	(Japan) Hiroko Kuwata	0	1
WC	(Australia) Ava Beck	3	2
9	(Switzerland) Simona Waltert	6	6

Qualifying competition
2	(Mexico) Renata Zarazúa	6	6
9	(Switzerland) Simona Waltert	4	3

==== Third qualifier ====
First round
3	(Switzerland) Viktorija Golubic	6	6^{5}	2
(United States) Alycia Parks	4	7^{7}	6
WC	(Australia) Gabriella Da Silva-Fick	5	3
Alt	(Japan) Ayano Shimizu	7	6

Qualifying competition
(United States) Alycia Parks	6	2	4
Alt	(Japan) Ayano Shimizu	2	6	6

==== Fourth qualifier ====
First round
4	(Italy) Elisabetta Cocciaretto	6	6
WC	(Australia) Jizelle Sibai	4	2
(Latvia) Darja Semeņistaja	7^{7}	7^{8}
10	(Japan) Moyuka Uchijima	6^{2}	6^{6}

Qualifying competition
4	(Italy) Elisabetta Cocciaretto	6	7
(Latvia) Darja Semeņistaja	3	5

==== Fifth qualifier ====
First round
5	(Croatia) Petra Marčinko	6	6
WC	(Australia) Sarah Rokusek	4	2
Oksana Selekhmeteva	6	6
8	(Hungary) Panna Udvardy	2	2

Qualifying competition
5	(Croatia) Petra Marčinko	4	2
Oksana Selekhmeteva	6	6

==== Sixth qualifier ====
First round
6	(United States) Caty McNally	6	7^{9}
(Slovenia) Kaja Juvan	2	6^{7}
(France) Tiantsoa Rakotomanga Rajaonah	3	1
11	(Austria) Julia Grabher	6	6

Qualifying competition
6	(United States) Caty McNally	6	6
11	(Austria) Julia Grabher	2	4
