= 2026 Hobart International – Doubles =

Doubles
- 2026 Hobart International

Final
- Champions: (Poland) Katarzyna Piter (Indonesia) Janice Tjen
- Runners-up: (Belgium) Magali Kempen (Czech Republic) Anna Sisková
- Score: 6–2, 6–2

Events
Singles	Doubles
- Hobart International

Katarzyna Piter and Janice Tjen defeated Magali Kempen and Anna Sisková in the final, 6–2, 6–2 to win the doubles tennis title at the 2026 Hobart International.

Jiang Xinyu and Wu Fang-hsien were the defending champions, but chose to compete with different partners. Jiang partnered Chan Hao-ching, but lost in the first round to Nadiia Kichenok and Makoto Ninomiya. Wu partnered Eri Hozumi , but lost in the semifinals to Piter and Tjen.

== Seeds ==
1. (Slovakia) Tereza Mihalíková / (United Kingdom) Olivia Nicholls (first round)
2. (Chinese Taipei) Chan Hao-ching / (China) Jiang Xinyu (first round)
3. (Japan) Eri Hozumi / (Chinese Taipei) Wu Fang-hsien (semifinals)
4. (China) Xu Yifan / (China) Yang Zhaoxuan (first round)

== Draw ==
Key

- Q = Qualifier
- WC = Wild card
- LL = Lucky loser
- Alt = Alternate
- ITF = ITF entry
- PR = Protected ranking
- SR = Special ranking
- SE = Special exempt
- JE = Junior exempt
- JR = Junior Accelerator Programme entrant
- CO = College Accelerator Programme entrant
- NG = Next Gen Accelerator Program entrant
- w/o = Walkover
- r = Retired
- d = Defaulted

First round
1	(Slovakia) T Mihalíková (United Kingdom) O Nicholls	0	2
(Belgium) M Kempen (Czech Republic) A Sisková	6	6
WC	(Australia) T Gibson (Australia) T Preston	4	6	[10]
(United States) Q Gleason (Netherlands) I Haverlag	6	3	[6]
4	(China) Y Xu (China) Z Yang	5	4
(China) Xin Wang (China) S Zheng	7	6
(Japan) S Aoyama (China) Q Tang	4	2
(Czech Republic) J Malečková (Czech Republic) M Škoch	6	6
(United Kingdom) M Lumsden (United States) S Santamaria	6	3	[3]
(Mexico) G Olmos (Indonesia) A Sutjiadi	1	6	[10]
Alt	(Japan) M Kobori (Japan) A Shimizu	3	1
3	(Japan) E Hozumi (Chinese Taipei) F-h Wu	6	6
(Poland) K Piter (Indonesia) J Tjen	3	6	[10]
WC	(Australia) G Da Silva-Fick (Australia) A Osborne	6	4	[5]
(Ukraine) N Kichenok (Japan) M Ninomiya	7	7
2	(Chinese Taipei) H-c Chan (China) X Jiang	5	5

Quarterfinals
(Belgium) M Kempen (Czech Republic) A Sisková	7	7
WC	(Australia) T Gibson (Australia) T Preston	5	5
(China) Xin Wang (China) S Zheng
(Czech Republic) J Malečková (Czech Republic) M Škoch	w/o
(Mexico) G Olmos (Indonesia) A Sutjiadi	1	3
3	(Japan) E Hozumi (Chinese Taipei) F-h Wu	6	6
(Poland) K Piter (Indonesia) J Tjen	6	5	[10]
(Ukraine) N Kichenok (Japan) M Ninomiya	3	7	[7]

Semifinals
(Belgium) M Kempen (Czech Republic) A Sisková	6	5	[10]
(Czech Republic) J Malečková (Czech Republic) M Škoch	3	7	[6]
3	(Japan) E Hozumi (Chinese Taipei) F-h Wu	5	3
(Poland) K Piter (Indonesia) J Tjen	7	6

Final
(Belgium) M Kempen (Czech Republic) A Sisková	2	2
(Poland) K Piter (Indonesia) J Tjen	6	6
