= 2020 Hobart International – Doubles =

Doubles
- 2020 Hobart International

Final
- Champions: (Ukraine) Nadiia Kichenok (India) Sania Mirza
- Runners-up: (China) Peng Shuai (China) Zhang Shuai
- Score: 6–4, 6–4

Events
Singles	Doubles
← 2019 ·	Hobart International	· 2023 →

Chan Hao-ching and Latisha Chan were the defending champions, but they lost in the first round to Kateryna Bondarenko and Sharon Fichman.

Nadiia Kichenok and Sania Mirza won the title, defeating Peng Shuai and Zhang Shuai in the final, 6–4, 6–4. This was Mirza's first tournament since 2017 after maternity leave.

== Seeds ==
1. (Chinese Taipei) Chan Hao-ching / (Chinese Taipei) Latisha Chan (first round)
2. (China) Peng Shuai / (China) Zhang Shuai (final)
3. (Japan) Makoto Ninomiya / (Czech Republic) Renata Voráčová (first round)
4. (Spain) Georgina García Pérez / (Spain) Sara Sorribes Tormo (first round)

== Draw ==
=== Key ===
- Q = Qualifier
- WC = Wild card
- LL = Lucky loser
- Alt = Alternate
- SE = Special exempt
- PR = Protected ranking
- ITF = ITF entry
- JE = Junior exempt
- w/o = Walkover
- r = Retired
- d = Defaulted
- SR = Special ranking

=== Draw ===
First round
1	(Chinese Taipei) H-c Chan (Chinese Taipei) L Chan	6	3	[4]
PR	(Ukraine) K Bondarenko (Canada) S Fichman	2	6	[10]
(Sweden) C Lister (United States) S Santamaria	6	3	[9]
(Czech Republic) M Bouzková (Slovenia) T Zidanšek	4	6	[11]
4	(Spain) G García Pérez (Spain) S Sorribes Tormo	2	5
(United States) V King (United States) C McHale	6	7
PR	(Ukraine) N Kichenok (India) S Mirza	2	7^{7}	[10]
(Georgia (country)) O Kalashnikova (Japan) M Kato	6	6^{3}	[3]
(Ukraine) K Kozlova (Poland) M Linette	5	3
(Belgium) K Flipkens (Belgium) A Van Uytvanck	7	6
WC	(Australia) L Cabrera (Australia) S Stosur	6	3	[10]
3	(Japan) M Ninomiya (Czech Republic) R Voráčová	2	6	[5]
(United States) H Carter (Brazil) L Stefani	6^{3}	2
Alt	(Netherlands) A Rus (United Kingdom) H Watson	7^{7}	6
WC	(Australia) J Moore (Australia) A Sharma	4	1
2	(China) S Peng (China) S Zhang	6	6

Quarterfinals
PR	(Ukraine) K Bondarenko (Canada) S Fichman	3	6	[4]
(Czech Republic) M Bouzková (Slovenia) T Zidanšek	6	3	[10]
(United States) V King (United States) C McHale	2	6	[4]
PR	(Ukraine) N Kichenok (India) S Mirza	6	4	[10]
(Belgium) K Flipkens (Belgium) A Van Uytvanck	6	7^{7}
WC	(Australia) L Cabrera (Australia) S Stosur	1	6^{2}
Alt	(Netherlands) A Rus (United Kingdom) H Watson
2	(China) S Peng (China) S Zhang	w/o

Semifinals
(Czech Republic) M Bouzková (Slovenia) T Zidanšek	6^{3}	2
PR	(Ukraine) N Kichenok (India) S Mirza	7^{7}	6
(Belgium) K Flipkens (Belgium) A Van Uytvanck
2	(China) S Peng (China) S Zhang	w/o

Final
PR	(Ukraine) N Kichenok (India) S Mirza	6	6
2	(China) S Peng (China) S Zhang	4	4
