= 2019 Hobart International – Singles =

Singles
- 2019 Hobart International

Final
- Champion: (United States) Sofia Kenin
- Runner-up: (Slovakia) Anna Karolína Schmiedlová
- Score: 6–3, 6–0

Details
- Draw: 32 (4 Q / 3 WC )
- Seeds: 8

Events
Singles	Doubles
← 2018 ·	Hobart International	· 2020 →

Elise Mertens was the two-time defending champion, but chose to compete in Sydney instead. Sofia Kenin won her first WTA Tour singles title without dropping a set. She defeated Anna Karolína Schmiedlová in the final, 6–3, 6–0.

== Seeds ==
1. (France) Caroline Garcia (first round)
2. (Romania) Mihaela Buzărnescu (first round)
3. (China) Zhang Shuai (first round)
4. (Greece) Maria Sakkari (first round)
5. (Russia) Anastasia Pavlyuchenkova (first round)
6. (France) Alizé Cornet (semifinals)
7. (Belgium) Kirsten Flipkens (quarterfinals)
8. (Belgium) Alison Van Uytvanck (second round)

== Draw ==
=== Finals ===
Semifinals
(United States) Sofia Kenin	6	6
6	(France) Alizé Cornet	2	4
(Slovakia) Anna Karolína Schmiedlová	7^{7}	4	6
(Switzerland) Belinda Bencic	6^{2}	6	2

Final
(United States) Sofia Kenin	6	6
(Slovakia) Anna Karolína Schmiedlová	3	0

=== Top half ===
First round
1/WC	(France) C Garcia	3	2
(United States) S Kenin	6	6
(Romania) A Bogdan	6^{8}	2
(Tunisia) O Jabeur	7^{10}	6
(Hungary) T Babos	3	3
(Slovakia) V Kužmová	6	6
(Slovenia) D Jakupović	4	5
7	(Belgium) K Flipkens	6	7
4	(Greece) M Sakkari	6	2	4
Q	(Poland) M Linette	3	6	6
Q	(Belgium) G Minnen	6	6
LL	(Ukraine) K Kozlova	4	0
(France) P Parmentier	6	5	7
WC	(Australia) E Perez	2	7	5
Q	(Australia) A Bai	4	2
6	(France) A Cornet	6	6

Second round
(United States) S Kenin	7^{8}	6
(Tunisia) O Jabeur	6^{6}	3
(Slovakia) V Kužmová	7^{7}	4	1
7	(Belgium) K Flipkens	6^{3}	6	6
Q	(Poland) M Linette	1	6	6^{3}
Q	(Belgium) G Minnen	6	4	7^{7}
(France) P Parmentier	3	0
6	(France) A Cornet	6	6

Quarterfinals
(United States) S Kenin	7	7
7	(Belgium) K Flipkens	5	5
Q	(Belgium) G Minnen	1	4
6	(France) A Cornet	6	6

Semifinals
(United States) S Kenin	6	6
6	(France) A Cornet	2	4

=== Bottom half ===
First round
8	(Belgium) A Van Uytvanck	7^{7}	7
LL	(United States) M Brengle	6^{5}	5
(Slovakia) AK Schmiedlová	7	6^{5}	6
(Russia) E Rodina	5	7^{7}	3
Q	(United Kingdom) H Watson	1	4
(Romania) I-C Begu	6	6
Q	(Russia) A Blinkova	6	0	6
3	(China) S Zhang	2	6	2
5	(Russia) A Pavlyuchenkova	3	6	3
(Belarus) V Lapko	6	3	6
Q	(Germany) L Siegemund	3	1
(Ukraine) D Yastremska	6	6
(Sweden) J Larsson	6^{1}	6^{2}
WC	(Australia) Z Hives	7^{7}	7^{7}
(Switzerland) B Bencic	4	6	7
2	(Romania) M Buzărnescu	6	3	5

Second round
8	(Belgium) A Van Uytvanck	3	2
(Slovakia) AK Schmiedlová	6	6
(Romania) I-C Begu	4	7^{7}	6
Q	(Russia) A Blinkova	6	6^{2}	2
(Belarus) V Lapko	1	4
(Ukraine) D Yastremska	6	6
WC	(Australia) Z Hives	2	4
(Switzerland) B Bencic	6	6

Quarterfinals
(Slovakia) AK Schmiedlová	7	7
(Romania) I-C Begu	5	5
(Ukraine) D Yastremska	6^{2}	3
(Switzerland) B Bencic	7^{7}	6

Semifinals
(Slovakia) AK Schmiedlová	7^{7}	4	6
(Switzerland) B Bencic	6^{2}	6	2

== Qualifying ==
=== Seeds ===
1. (Germany) Mona Barthel (moved to main draw, withdrew)
2. (Slovenia) Dalila Jakupović (moved to main draw)
3. (Poland) Magda Linette (qualified)
4. (Spain) Lara Arruabarrena (first round)
5. (Slovenia) Polona Hercog (first round)
6. (Spain) Sara Sorribes Tormo (first round)
7. (United States) Madison Brengle (qualifying competition, lucky loser)
8. (United Kingdom) Heather Watson (qualified)
9. (Russia) Anastasia Potapova (first round)
10. (Russia) Anna Blinkova (qualified)
11. (United Kingdom) Katie Boulter (first round)
12. (Ukraine) Kateryna Kozlova (qualifying competition, lucky loser)

=== Qualifiers ===
1. (United Kingdom) Heather Watson
2. (Germany) Laura Siegemund
3. (Poland) Magda Linette
4. (Russia) Anna Blinkova
5. (Australia) Alison Bai
6. (Belgium) Greet Minnen

=== Lucky losers ===
1. (Ukraine) Kateryna Kozlova
2. (United States) Madison Brengle

=== Qualifying draw ===
==== First qualifier ====
First round
Alt	(United States) Sabrina Santamaria	3	0
(Australia) Isabelle Wallace	6	6
(Australia) Naiktha Bains	5	3
8	(United Kingdom) Heather Watson	7	6

Qualifying competition
(Australia) Isabelle Wallace	4	4
8	(United Kingdom) Heather Watson	6	6

==== Second qualifier ====
First round
Alt	(Russia) Alexandra Panova	6	6^{5}	4
(Germany) Laura Siegemund	1	7^{7}	6
WC	(Australia) Belinda Woolcock	1	5
7	(United States) Madison Brengle	6	7

Qualifying competition
(Germany) Laura Siegemund	6	6^{5}	6
7	(United States) Madison Brengle	4	7^{7}	1

==== Third qualifier ====
First round
3	(Poland) Magda Linette	6	6
WC	(Australia) Seone Mendez	0	3
(France) Irina Ramialison	6^{3}	3
12	(Ukraine) Kateryna Kozlova	7^{7}	6

Qualifying competition
3	(Poland) Magda Linette	7^{9}	6^{5}	6
12	(Ukraine) Kateryna Kozlova	6^{7}	7^{7}	4

==== Fourth qualifier ====
First round
4	(Spain) Lara Arruabarrena	1	6	3
(Australia) Kaylah McPhee	6	3	6
WC	(Australia) Gabriella Da Silva-Fick	4	2
10	(Russia) Anna Blinkova	6	6

Qualifying competition
(Australia) Kaylah McPhee	6^{4}	6	3
10	(Russia) Anna Blinkova	7^{7}	3	6

==== Fifth qualifier ====
First round
5	(Slovenia) Polona Hercog	7^{7}	0	3
WC	(Australia) Olivia Rogowska	6^{5}	6	6
(Australia) Alison Bai	6	6
9	(Russia) Anastasia Potapova	3	2

Qualifying competition
WC	(Australia) Olivia Rogowska	4	7^{7}	1
(Australia) Alison Bai	6	6^{5}	6

==== Sixth qualifier ====
First round
6	(Spain) Sara Sorribes Tormo	3	7^{8}	3
(France) Fiona Ferro	6	6^{6}	6
(Belgium) Greet Minnen	6	3	6
11	(United Kingdom) Katie Boulter	3	6	1

Qualifying competition
(France) Fiona Ferro	4	4
(Belgium) Greet Minnen	6	6
