= Dominique Monami =

Belgian tennis player

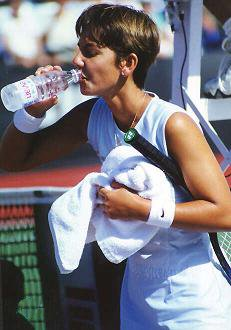
- Dominique in 2003
- Country (sports): Belgium
- Residence: Mechelen
- Born: 31 May 1973 (age 53) Verviers, Liège
- Height: 1.70 m (5 ft 7 in)
- Turned pro: June 1991
- Retired: October 2000
- Plays: Right-handed (two handed-backhand)
- Prize money: US$ 2,013,032

Singles
- Career record: 295–182
- Career titles: 4
- Highest ranking: No. 9 (12 October 1998)

Grand Slam singles results
- Australian Open: QF (1997, 1999)
- French Open: 3R (1997, 1998)
- Wimbledon: 4R (1998, 1999)
- US Open: 3R (1998, 1999)

Other tournaments
- Olympic Games: QF (2000)

Doubles
- Career record: 126–123
- Career titles: 4
- Highest ranking: No. 21

Grand Slam doubles results
- Australian Open: QF (1999, 2000)
- French Open: 3R (1999)
- Wimbledon: 3R (1998, 1999, 2000)
- US Open: SF (2000)
Medal record
Olympic Games
Bronze medal – third place	2000 Sydney	Doubles

Dominique Monami (born 31 May 1973) is a Belgian former professional tennis player. She is her country's first ever top-10 tennis professional.

Monami was born in Verviers. In 1995, she married her coach Bart Van Roost, with whom she has a daughter, and played under the name Dominique Van Roost for much of her career, until their divorce in 2003.

== Career ==
Monami won her first WTA Tour tournament in 1996 in Cardiff (Welsh Open). Before this win, she had been on the ITF circuit where she won seven ITF events, five of which in 1990. In 1997, she reached the quarterfinals of the Australian Open. The following year, Van Roost became the first ever Belgian tennis player (male or female) to reach the top 10 in WTA rankings.

Monami won a total of four WTA singles titles and reached a career-high singles ranking of world No. 9 in October 1998. In total, she participated in 36 Grand Slam tournaments during her career.

Another achievement for Van Roost came during the 2000 Summer Olympics in Sydney where she won the bronze medal in the women's doubles competition, partnering Els Callens. Also in doubles, she reached the quarterfinals of the Australian Open in 1999 and 2000, and the semifinals of the 2000 US Open.

In November 2000, Monami ended her professional tennis career when she became pregnant by Bart Van Roost, whom she divorced later in 2003. Subsequently, in 2006, she married Erik Vink, a manager in Sony BMG.

After retiring from playing, Monami became involved in Belgian tennis in various capacities, including as a tournament director (Brussels Open) and as Fed Cup captain. She also wrote a book titled Een Kwestie van Karakter (Tout est dans le caractère). Monami was awarded Belgian Sports Personality of the Year in 1998.

Since October 2021 is Monami vice-president of the Belgian Olympic Committee.

== Significant finals ==
=== Olympics ===
==== Doubles: 1 (bronze medal) ====
Outcome	Year	Location	Surface	Partner	Opponents	Score
Bronze	2000	Sydney	Hard	(Belgium) Els Callens	(Belarus) Olga Barabanschikova (Belarus) Natalia Zvereva	4–6, 6–4, 6–1

== WTA career finals ==
Legend
Tier I (0–0)
Tier II (0–3)
Tier III (0–4)
Tier IV (4–5)

=== Singles: 16 (4 titles, 12 runner-ups) ===
Result	W/L	Date	Tournament	Surface	Opponent	Score
Loss	1.	Oct 1993	Montpellier Open, France	Carpet (i)	(Kazakhstan) Elena Likhovtseva	3–6, 4–6
Loss	2.	Oct 1995	Bell Challenge, Canada	Carpet (i)	(Netherlands) Brenda Schultz-McCarthy	6–7^{(5–7)}, 2–6
Win	1.	May 1996	British Clay Court Championships, UK	Clay	(Belgium) Laurence Courtois	6–4, 6–2
Win	2.	Jan 1997	Hobart International, Australia	Hard	(United States) Marianne Werdel	6–3, 6–3
Win	3.	Sep 1997	Surabaya International, Indonesia	Hard	(Czech Republic) Lenka Němečková	6–1, 6–3
Loss	3.	Oct 1997	Tournoi de Québec, Canada	Carpet (i)	(Netherlands) Brenda Schultz-McCarthy	4–6, 7–6^{(7–4)}, 5–7
Loss	4.	Nov 1997	Pattaya Open, Thailand	Hard	(Slovakia) Henrieta Nagyová	5–7, 7–6^{(6)}, 5–7
Win	4.	Jan 1998	Auckland Open, New Zealand	Hard	(Italy) Silvia Farina	4–6, 7–6, 7–5
Loss	5.	Jan 1998	Hobart International, Australia	Hard	(Switzerland) Patty Schnyder	3–6, 2–6
Loss	6.	Feb 1998	Paris Indoor, France	Carpet (i)	(France) Mary Pierce	3–6, 5–7
Loss	7.	Feb 1998	Linz Open, Austria	Carpet (i)	(Czech Republic) Jana Novotná	1–6, 6–7^{(2–7)}
Loss	8.	May 1998	Madrid Open, Spain	Clay	(Switzerland) Patty Schnyder	6–3, 4–6, 0–6
Loss	9.	Jan 1999	Auckland Open, New Zealand	Hard	(France) Julie Halard-Decugis	4–6, 1–6
Loss	10.	Sep 1999	Luxembourg Open	Carpet (i)	(Belgium) Kim Clijsters	2–6, 2–6
Loss	11.	Jun 2000	Eastbourne International, UK	Grass	(France) Julie Halard-Decugis	6–7^{(4–7)}, 4–6
Loss	12.	Jul 2000	Knokke-Heist Trophy, Belgium	Clay	(Israel) Anna Smashnova	2–6, 5–7

=== Doubles: 9 (4 titles, 5 runner-ups) ===
Result	W/L	Date	Tournament	Surface	Partner	Opponents	Score
Loss	1.	May 1993	Belgian Open	Clay	(Belgium) Ann Devries	(Czech Republic) Radka Bobková (Argentina) María José Gaidano	4–6, 6–2, 6–7^{(4–7)}
Win	1.	Jul 1993	Austrian Open	Clay	(China) Li Fang	(Croatia) Maja Murić (Czech Republic) Pavlína Rajzlová	6–2, 6–1
Loss	2.	Oct 1993	Montpellier Open, France	Carpet (i)	(Slovakia) Janette Husárová	(United States) Meredith McGrath (Germany) Claudia Porwik	6–3, 2–6, 6–7^{(3–7)}
Loss	3.	Oct 1996	Luxembourg Open	Carpet (i)	(Germany) Barbara Rittner	(Netherlands) Kristie Boogert (France) Nathalie Tauziat	6–2, 4–6, 2–6
Win	2.	Jan 1997	Auckland Open, New Zealand	Hard	(Slovakia) Janette Husárová	(Poland) Aleksandra Olsza (Bulgaria) Elena Pampoulova	6–2, 6–7^{(5–7)}, 6–3
Loss	4.	Jan 1997	Hobart International, Australia	Hard	(Germany) Barbara Rittner	(Japan) Naoko Kijimuta (Japan) Nana Miyagi	3–6, 1–6
Loss	5.	Nov 1997	Pattaya Open, Thailand	Hard	(Argentina) Florencia Labat	(Australia) Kristine Kunce (United States) Corina Morariu	3–6, 4–6
Win	3.	May 1998	Madrid Open, Spain	Clay	(Argentina) Florencia Labat	(Australia) Rachel McQuillan (Australia) Nicole Pratt	6–3, 6–1
Win	4.	Aug 2000	LA Tennis Championships, U.S.	Hard	(Belgium) Els Callens	(United States) Kimberly Po (France) Anne-Gaëlle Sidot	6–2, 7–5

== ITF finals ==
Legend
$100,000 tournaments
$75,000 tournaments
$50,000 tournaments
$25,000 tournaments
$10,000 tournaments

=== Singles: 8 (7–1) ===
Result	No.	Year	Tournament	Surface	Opponent	Score
Win	1.	6 August 1990	ITF Koksijde, Belgium	Clay	(Poland) Magdalena Feistel	6–2, 6–1
Win	2.	17 September 1990	ITF Napoli, Italy	Clay	(Czechoslovakia) Klára Bláhová	6–3, 6–2
Win	3.	24 September 1990	ITF Napoli, Italy	Clay	(Sweden) Catarina Bernstein	4–6, 6–4, 6–2
Win	4.	15 October 1990	ITF Burgdorf, Switzerland	Carpet (i)	(West Germany) Sabine Lohmann	5–7, 6–2, 6–4
Win	5.	22 October 1990	ITF Lyss, Switzerland	Clay	(West Germany) Katja Meichelbock	6–2, 6–2
Loss	1.	12 November 1990	ITF Swindon, United Kingdom	Carpet (i)	(France) Sandrine Testud	4–6, 4–6
Win	6.	27 February 1995	ITF Southampton, UK	Carpet (i)	(Germany) Angela Kerek	0–6, 6–4, 6–3
Win	7.	29 September 1996	ITF Limoges, France	Hard (i)	(Sweden) Åsa Carlsson	2–6, 7–6^{(4)}, 6–1

=== Doubles: 2 (1–1) ===
Result	No.	Date	Tournament	Surface	Partner	Opponents	Score
Win	1.	27 February 1995	ITF Southampton, UK	Carpet (i)	(Hungary) Andrea Temesvari	(Netherlands) Seda Noorlander (Greece) Christína Papadáki	6–4, 6–2
Loss	1.	28 September 1996	ITF Limoges, France	Hard (i)	(France) Caroline Dhenin	(Ukraine) Natalia Medvedeva (Latvia) Larisa Neiland	1–6, 1–6

== Singles performance timeline ==
Key
W	F	SF	QF	#R	RR	Q#	DNQ	A	NH

(W) winner; (F) finalist; (SF) semifinalist; (QF) quarterfinalist; (#R) rounds 4, 3, 2, 1; (RR) round-robin stage; (Q#) qualification round; (DNQ) did not qualify; (A) absent; (NH) not held; (SR) strike rate (events won / competed); (W–L) win–loss record.

Tournament	1991	1992	1993	1994	1995	1996	1997	1998	1999	2000	SR	W–L	W%
Australian Open	A	4R	2R	1R	Q1	2R	QF	3R	QF	2R	0 / 8	15–8	65%
French Open	Q1	1R	1R	1R	2R	1R	3R	3R	1R	2R	0 / 9	6–9	40%
Wimbledon	A	1R	1R	3R	2R	3R	1R	4R	4R	1R	0 / 9	11–9	55%
US Open	3R	2R	2R	1R	2R	1R	1R	3R	3R	2R	0 / 10	10–10	50%
Year-end championships
Tour Championships	A	A	A	A	A	A	A	QF	QF	A	0 / 2	2–2	50%
Tier I tournaments
Tokyo	Tier II		A	1R	A	A	A	A	A	A	0 / 1	0–1	0%
Indian Wells	Tier II						A	3R	1R	4R	0 / 3	4–3	57%
Miami	A	A	A	2R	3R	2R	2R	2R	2R	3R	0 / 7	5–6	45%
Berlin	A	A	A	A	A	A	A	1R	2R	A	0 / 2	1–2	33%
Rome	A	A	A	1R	A	A	3R	3R	QF	2R	0 / 5	8–5	62%
Montreal / Toronto	A	1R	A	A	A	A	A	2R	A	1R	0 / 3	1–3	25%
Moscow	T V	Not Held		Tier III			SF	A	SF	A	0 / 2	6–2	75%
Zürich	Tier II		A	A	A	A	2R	QF	QF	1R	0 / 4	5–4	56%
Year-end ranking	129	100	59	133	43	46	18	12	14	24			

== Head-to-head record ==
=== Record vs. top 10 players ===
- Martina Hingis 1–5
- Venus Williams 1–2
- Serena Williams 1–1
- Kim Clijsters 1–1
- Elena Dementieva 1–0
- Lisa Raymond 1–1
- Mary Pierce 0–5
- Barbara Schett 3–1
- Julie Halard-Decugis 2–2
- Lindsay Davenport 2–1
- Nadia Petrova 1–0
- Jennifer Capriati 0–2
- Monica Seles 0–3
- Amanda Coetzer 4–1

Awards and achievements
Preceded by Not given	Belgian Sports Personality of the Year; 1998	Succeeded by Luc Van Lierde
