= Kyōko Nagatsuka =

Japanese tennis player (born 1974)

Kyōko Nagatsuka 長塚京子
- Country (sports): Japan
- Born: 22 February 1974 (age 51) Chiba Prefecture, Japan
- Height: 1.66 m (5 ft 5 1/2 in)
- Turned pro: 1989
- Retired: 1998
- Prize money: $421,541

Singles
- Career record: 121–125
- Career titles: 0
- Highest ranking: No. 28 (14 August 1995)

Grand Slam singles results
- Australian Open: 4R (1995)
- French Open: 4R (1995)
- Wimbledon: 2R (1995)
- US Open: 2R (1993, 1994)

Doubles
- Career record: 62–70
- Career titles: 2 WTA, 1 ITF
- Highest ranking: No. 31 (19 June 1995)

Grand Slam doubles results
- Australian Open: 2R (1994, 1995, 1996)
- French Open: 2R (1995, 1996)
- Wimbledon: 1R (1993, 1995, 1996)
- US Open: 3R (1995)

Other doubles tournaments
- Olympic Games: 1R (1996)

Kyōko Nagatsuka (Japanese: 長塚京子, born February 22, 1974) is a Japanese former professional tennis player. She achieved a career-high ranking of world No. 28 on 14 August 1995. In doubles, she reached as high as No. 31 in June 1995.

She won the 12-and-under championships of Japan in 1986, and the under-16 in 1989.

Nagatsuka reached three singles finals on the WTA Tour but failed to win the title in any of them. She did, however, win two doubles titles as well as achieving a further three runner-ups in doubles competition. She reached the fourth round of a Grand Slam tournament twice in singles: at the 1995 Australian Open, where she beat a young Martina Hingis and Amy Frazier, and that same year at the French Open.

Playing for the Japan Fed Cup team, she has a win–loss record of 2–4.

Since her retirement, she has briefly worked as a coach with Akiko Morigami.

== WTA Tour finals ==
=== Singles: 3 (runner-ups) ===
Result	W/L	Date	Tournament	Surface	Opponent	Score
Loss	0–1	Feb 1994	China Open	Hard (i)	(Indonesia) Yayuk Basuki	4–6, 2–6
Loss	0–2	Nov 1994	Taiwan Open	Hard	(Chinese Taipei) Wang Shi-ting	1–6, 3–6
Loss	0–3	Mar 1995	Puerto Rico Open	Hard	(South Africa) Joannette Kruger	6–7^{(5–7)}, 3–6

=== Doubles: 5 (2 titles, 3 runner-ups) ===
Result	W/L	Date	Tournament	Surface	Partner	Opponents	Score
Loss	0–1	Apr 1993	Japan Open	Hard	(China) Li Fang	(Japan) Ei Iida (Japan) Maya Kidowaki	2–6, 6–4, 4–6
Loss	0–2	Nov 1994	Commonwealth Classic, Bali	Hard	(Japan) Ai Sugiyama	(Indonesia) Yayuk Basuki (Indonesia) Romana Tedjakusuma	w/o
Win	1–2	Jan 1995	Hobart International, Australia	Hard	(Japan) Ai Sugiyama	(Netherlands) Manon Bollegraf (Latvia) Larisa Neiland	2–6, 6–4, 6–2
Loss	1–3	Apr 1995	Japan Open	Hard	(Japan) Ai Sugiyama	(Japan) Yuka Yoshida (Japan) Miho Saeki	7–6^{(7–5)}, 4–6, 6–7^{(5–7)}
Win	2–3	Jan 1996	Hobart International, Australia	Hard	(Indonesia) Yayuk Basuki	(Australia) Kerry-Anne Guse (South Korea) Park Sung-hee	7–6, 6–3

== ITF Circuit finals ==
$50,000 tournaments
$25,000 tournaments
$10,000 tournaments

=== Singles (0–2) ===
Result	No.	Date	Tournament	Surface	Opponent	Score
Loss	1.	1 March 1992	ITF Miami, United States	Hard	(United States) Caroline Kuhlman	6–4, 2–6, 5–7
Loss	2.	5 October 1997	ITF Santa Clara, United States	Hard	(Poland) Magdalena Grzybowska	1–6, 5–7

=== Doubles (1–2) ===
Result	No.	Date	Tournament	Surface	Partner	Opponents	Score
Win	1.	21 June 1992	ITF Milano, Italy	Clay	(Japan) Miki Yokobori	(Brazil) Luciana Tella (Brazil) Andrea Vieira	3–6, 6–1, 6–3
Loss	2.	12 June 1994	ITF Caserta, Italy	Clay	(Japan) Mami Donoshiro	(Italy) Flora Perfetti (Hungary) Virág Csurgó	1–6, 5–7
Loss	3.	16 March 1998	ITF Noda, Japan	Hard	(Japan) Saori Obata	(Japan) Keiko Ishida (Japan) Keiko Nagatomi	6–3, 2–6, 3–6
