= Magdalena Grzybowska =

Polish tennis player (born 1978)

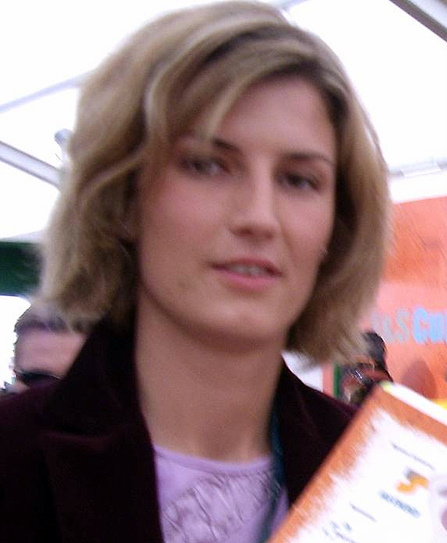
- Country (sports): Poland
- Residence: Warsaw, Poland
- Born: 22 November 1978 (age 46); Poznań, Poland
- Height: 1.84 m (6 ft 0 in)
- Turned pro: 1995
- Retired: 2002
- Plays: Right-handed
- Prize money: $542,889

Singles
- Career record: 139–115
- Career titles: 4 ITF
- Highest ranking: No. 30 (10 August 1998)

Grand Slam singles results
- Australian Open: 3R (1997, 1998)
- French Open: 3R (2000)
- Wimbledon: 3R (1997)
- US Open: 2R (1998, 1999)

Doubles
- Career record: 51–66
- Career titles: 3 ITF
- Highest ranking: No. 86 (15 September 1997)

Magdalena Grzybowska (born 22 November 1978) is a former tennis player from Poland.

Grzybowska, born in Poznań, won the juniors singles competition at the 1996 Australian Open.

She also competed for Poland in the 1996 Olympics in Atlanta, where she lost in the first round.

Until her knee injury in 1998, she managed a rather successful career, culminating in the 30th position in the cumulative WTA rankings for that year, the highest standing for a Polish woman until Agnieszka Radwańska.

She retired in 2002 at age 24.

Playing for Poland Fed Cup team, she has a win–loss record of 8–10.

After having retired from tennis, she completed her university studies in Paris, and she is working as a tennis commentator for Eurosport in Warsaw, Poland.

== ITF Circuit finals ==
$75,000 tournaments
$50,000 tournaments
$25,000 tournaments
$10,000 tournaments

=== Singles: 6 (4–2) ===
| Result | No. | Date | Tournament | Surface | Opponent | Score |
|---|---|---|---|---|---|---|
| Loss | 1. | 17 July 1994 | ITF Olsztyn, Poland | Clay | (Slovakia) Henrieta Nagyová | 4–6, 6–2, 4–6 |
| Win | 2. | 14 August 1994 | ITF Szczecin, Poland | Clay | (Czech Republic) Alena Vašková | 7–6, 6–2 |
| Loss | 3. | 8 May 1995 | ITF Szczecin, Poland | Clay | (France) Alexandra Fusai | 5–7, 6–7 |
| Win | 4. | 25 September 1995 | ITF Bratislava, Slovakia | Clay | (Slovakia) Janette Husárová | 2–6, 6–4, 6–1 |
| Win | 5. | 10 August 1997 | ITF Sopot, Poland | Clay | (Czech Republic) Denisa Chládková | 6–3, 6–2 |
| Win | 6. | 5 October 1997 | ITF Santa Clara, United States | Hard | (Japan) Kyōko Nagatsuka | 6–1, 7–5 |

=== Doubles: 4 (3–1) ===
| Result | No. | Date | Tournament | Surface | Partner | Opponents | Score |
|---|---|---|---|---|---|---|---|
| Win | 1. | 17 June 1995 | ITF Getxo, Spain | Clay | (Argentina) María Fernanda Landa | (Netherlands) Maaike Koutstaal (Netherlands) Seda Noorlander | 6–2, 6–4 |
| Win | 2. | 28 August 1995 | ITF Athens, Greece | Clay | (Slovakia) Henrieta Nagyová | (United States) Corina Morariu (Greece) Christina Zachariadou | w/o |
| Loss | 3. | 25 September 1995 | ITF Bratislava, Slovakia | Clay | (Netherlands) Yvette Basting | (Czech Republic) Petra Langrová (Slovakia) Radka Zrubáková | 3–6, 1–6 |
| Win | 4. | 1 August 1999 | ITF Bytom, Poland | Clay | (Spain) Eva Bes | (Spain) Gisela Riera (Romania) Raluca Sandu | 6–4, 7–5 |
