= Hobart International Tennis Centre =

Tennis centre in Hobart, Tasmania, Australia

The Domain Tennis Centre
- Hobart International Tennis Centre
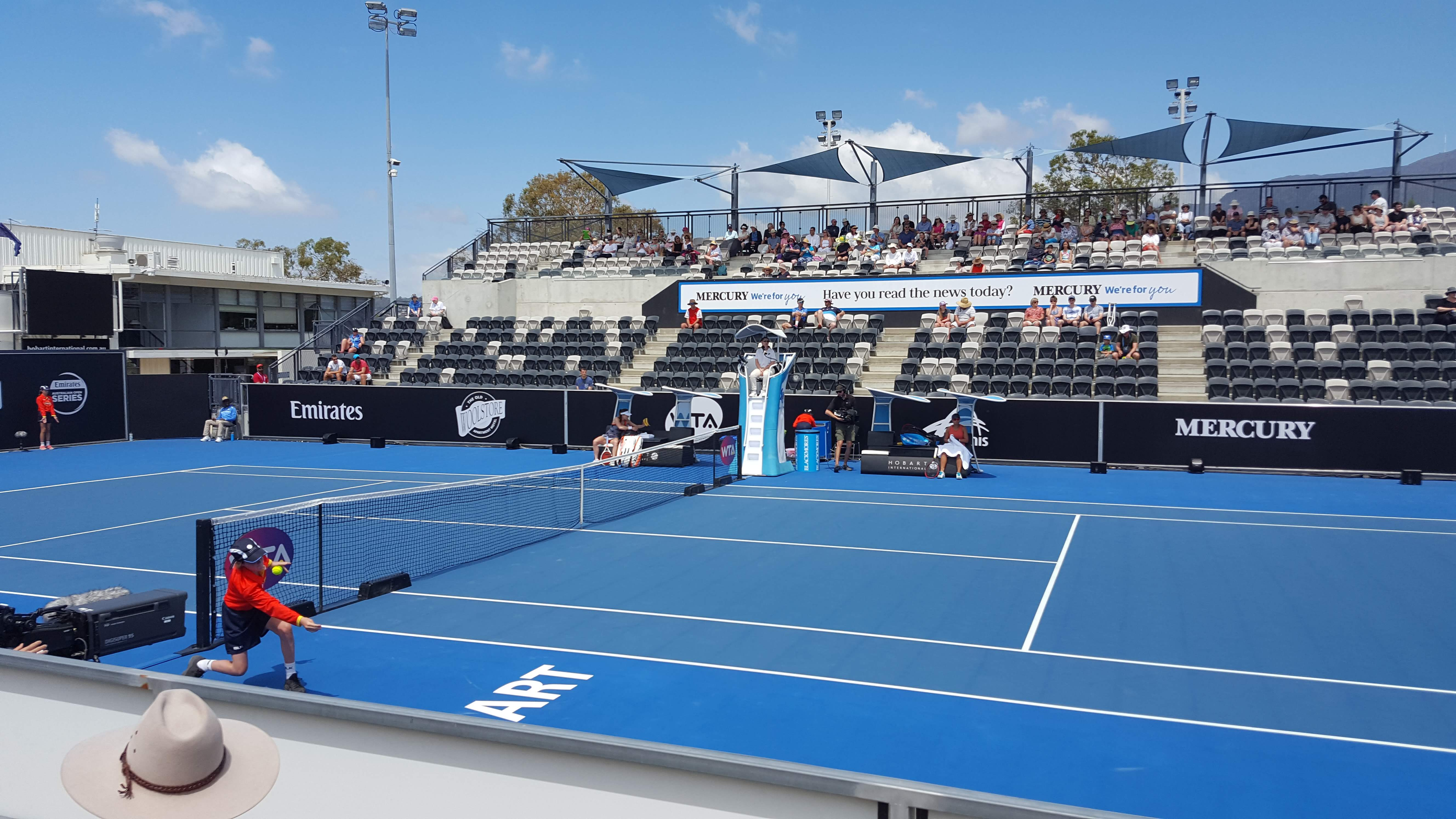

- Location within Hobart
- Location: Queens Domain, Hobart, Tasmania
- Coordinates: 42°52′24″S 147°19′47″E
- Capacity: 2,800
- Surface: Plexicushion

Construction
- Groundbreaking: 1960
- Opened: 26 November 1964
- Renovated: 2011

Tenants
- Tasmanian Lawn Tennis Association; Hobart International (1994–present)

Website
- www.domaintennis.com.au

The Domain Tennis Centre is the premier tennis facility in the state of Tasmania, Australia. It is located on the Queens Domain less than 1 kilometre from the CBD of Hobart.

The Hobart International Tennis Centre has 6 plexicushion hardcourts, 7 synthetic grass courts, and 5 clay courts, all of which are of top international standard. The centre also features a pro shop, bar and clubhouse with over 800 members.

The Club hosts training and junior development, as well as regular competition ranging from weekly matches to the Tasmanian Junior Masters and Tasmanian Junior Open, and the Moorilla Hobart International which is part of the Sony Ericsson WTA Tour, with over $US145,000 in prize money, and recently having featured former world number ones Kim Clijsters (2000 Champion), Serena Williams and Justine Henin, and also other top players such as Patty Schnyder (1998 Champion), Alicia Molik (2003 Champion), American veteran Amy Frazier (2004 Champion) and Australian Open and Wimbledon semifinalist Zheng Jie (2005 Champion).

== Redevelopment ==
Midway through 2009, the Tasmanian Government announced a $2.25 million to fund redevelopments to the Domain Tennis Centre over 2009–10. This announcement was to ensure that the Moorilla Hobart International tournament was retained. Prior to the 2010 singles final, representatives from Tennis Australia, along with tournament director Michael Roberts, announced that the future of the tournament would be secured through to 2013.

In 2009, the Domain Tennis Centre began a series of redevelopments in order to ensure the tournament's future. The first stage of these redevelopments included the demolition of the northern seating to make way for a permanent Corporate Stand and also a new Media Stand at the southern end of the Centre Court. This was completed prior to the 2010 Moorilla Hobart International tournament. The second stage of the redevelopment is to construct new permanent grandstands at the eastern and western ends of the court, increasing seating from around 1000 spectators to 2800. The redevelopment was completed before the 2011 tournament.

== See also ==
- List of tennis stadiums by capacity
