= Hobart International =

WTA Tour
- Founded: 1994; 32 years ago
- Location: Hobart; Australia
- Venue: Domain Tennis Centre
- Category: WTA 250
- Surface: Hard (Plexicushion) – outdoors
- Draw: 32S / 24Q / 16D
- Prize money: US$283,347 (2026)
- Website: HobartInternational.com.au

Current champions (2026)
- Singles: (Italy) Elisabetta Cocciaretto
- Doubles: (Indonesia) Janice Tjen (Poland) Katarzyna Piter

The Hobart International is a women's professional tennis tournament held at the Hobart International Tennis Centre in Hobart, Australia. The tournament was founded in 1994 as the Tasmanian International Open, it forms a part of the Women's Tennis Association (WTA) Tour and is classed as a WTA 250 tournament (previously International and Tier IV). It is played on outdoor hardcourts, and is held in the run-up to the first Grand Slam tournament of the year, the Australian Open as part of the Australian Open Series.

The tournament is held at the Hobart International Tennis Centre. It was previously sponsored by Moorilla Wines, ANZ and Schweppes. The tournament has played host to a number of top players in the past, such as World #1's Victoria Azarenka, Kim Clijsters, Justine Henin, Garbiñe Muguruza, Naomi Osaka, Elena Rybakina, Serena Williams and Venus Williams. Other top players who have participated in the event include Grand Slam Winners Sofia Kenin, Petra Kvitová and Sloane Stephens. Former Top 10 players Jelena Dokić, Anna Chakvetadze, Julie Halard-Decugis, Caroline Garcia, Alicia Molik, Dominique Monami, Flavia Pennetta, Chanda Rubin, Patty Schnyder, Samantha Stosur and Vera Zvonareva have also participated.

Elise Mertens is the only multiple time singles champion, having won back-to-back titles in 2017 and 2018. She also lost the singles final twice, in 2024 and 2025.

== History ==
In 1893, the Tasmanian Lawn Tennis Championships were established as a combined men's and women's international tennis tournament. In 1969 that tournament's name was changed to the Tasmanian Open Championships, becoming the Tasmanian Open played in Hobart on hard courts in 1978. That tournament ended in 1980. In 1994 this successor event for former women's tournament was revived as the Tasmanian International Open and remained branded under that name until 2003 when the tournament name was changed to the Moorilla Hobart International. In 2014 the tournament was rebranded again as the Hobart International.

== Redevelopment ==
Prior to the Australian Open changing its court surface, the tournament was played on Rebound Ace. When the Australian Open changed to Plexicushion in 2008, all Australian Open Series tournaments were required to change their court surfaces to Plexicushion. The Moorilla Hobart International, however, retained Rebound Ace. Tennis Australia announced that in order for Hobart to keep its tournament, it was required to make significant improvements to the facility, including resurfacing the courts to Plexicushion and improving the seating facilities. The Domain Tennis Centre resurfaced its hardcourts to Plexicushion in late 2008, in time for the 2009 tournament.

Midway through 2009, the Tasmanian Government announced a $2.25 million to fund redevelopments to the Domain Tennis Centre over 2009–10. This announcement was to ensure that the Moorilla Hobart International tournament was retained. Prior to the 2010 singles final, representatives from Tennis Australia, along with tournament director Michael Roberts, announced that the future of the tournament would be secured through to 2013.

In 2009, the Domain Tennis Centre began a series of redevelopments in order to ensure the tournament's future. The first stage of these redevelopments included the demolition of the northern seating to make way for a permanent Corporate Stand and also a new Media Stand at the southern end of the Centre Court. This was completed prior to the 2010 tournament. The second stage of the redevelopment is to construct new permanent grandstands at the eastern and western ends of the court, increasing seating from around 1000 spectators to 2800. The redevelopment was completed by the 2011 tournament.

== Past finals ==
=== Singles ===
Year	Champion	Runner-up	Score
↓ Tier IV ↓
1994	(Japan) Mana Endo	(Australia) Rachel McQuillan	6–1, 6–7 ^{(1–7)}, 6–4
1995	(Georgia (country)) Leila Meskhi	(China) Li Fang	6–2, 6–3
1996	(France) Julie Halard-Decugis	(Japan) Mana Endo	6–1, 6–2
1997	(Belgium) Dominique van Roost	(United States) Marianne Werdel Witmeyer	6–3, 6–3
1998	(Switzerland) Patty Schnyder	(Belgium) Dominique van Roost	6–3, 6–2
1999	(United States) Chanda Rubin	(Italy) Rita Grande	6–2, 6–3
2000	(Belgium) Kim Clijsters	(United States) Chanda Rubin	2–6, 6–2, 6–2
↓ Tier V ↓
2001	(Italy) Rita Grande	(United States) Jennifer Hopkins	0–6, 6–3, 6–3
2002	(Slovakia) Martina Suchá	(Spain) Anabel Medina Garrigues	7–6 ^{(9–7)}, 6–1
2003	(Australia) Alicia Molik	(United States) Amy Frazier	6–2, 4–6, 6–4
2004	(United States) Amy Frazier	(Japan) Shinobu Asagoe	6–3, 6–3
2005	(China) Zheng Jie	(Argentina) Gisela Dulko	6–2, 6–0
↓ Tier IV ↓
2006	(Netherlands) Michaëlla Krajicek	(Czech Republic) Iveta Benešová	6–2, 6–1
2007	(Russia) Anna Chakvetadze	(Russia) Vasilisa Bardina	6–3, 7–6 ^{(7–3)}
2008	(Greece) Eleni Daniilidou	(Russia) Vera Zvonareva	walkover
↓ International ↓
2009	(Czech Republic) Petra Kvitová	(Czech Republic) Iveta Benešová	7–5, 6–1
2010	(Ukraine) Alona Bondarenko	(Israel) Shahar Pe'er	6–2, 6–4
2011	(Australia) Jarmila Groth	(United States) Bethanie Mattek-Sands	6–4, 6–3
2012	(Germany) Mona Barthel	(Belgium) Yanina Wickmayer	6–1, 6–2
2013	(Russia) Elena Vesnina	(Germany) Mona Barthel	6–3, 6–4
2014	(Spain) Garbiñe Muguruza	(Czech Republic) Klára Zakopalová	6–4, 6–0
2015	(United Kingdom) Heather Watson	(United States) Madison Brengle	6–3, 6–4
2016	(France) Alizé Cornet	(Canada) Eugenie Bouchard	6–1, 6–2
2017	(Belgium) Elise Mertens	(Romania) Monica Niculescu	6–3, 6–1
2018	(Belgium) Elise Mertens (2)	(Romania) Mihaela Buzărnescu	6–1, 4–6, 6–3
2019	(United States) Sofia Kenin	(Slovakia) Anna Karolína Schmiedlová	6–3, 6–0
2020	(Kazakhstan) Elena Rybakina	(China) Zhang Shuai	7–6^{(9–7)}, 6–3
2021	not held		
2022	not held		
↓ WTA 250 ↓
2023	(United States) Lauren Davis	(Italy) Elisabetta Cocciaretto	7–6^{(7–0)}, 6–2
2024	(United States) Emma Navarro	(Belgium) Elise Mertens	6–1, 4–6, 7–5
2025	(United States) McCartney Kessler	(Belgium) Elise Mertens	6–4, 3–6, 6–0
2026	(Italy) Elisabetta Cocciaretto	(United States) Iva Jovic	6–4, 6–4

=== Doubles ===
Year	Champions	Runners-up	Score
1994	(United States) Linda Wild (United States) Chanda Rubin	(Australia) Jenny Byrne (Australia) Rachel McQuillan	7–5, 4–6, 7–6^{(7–1)}
1995	(Japan) Kyōko Nagatsuka (Japan) Ai Sugiyama	(Netherlands) Manon Bollegraf (Latvia) Larisa Neiland	2–6, 6–4, 6–2
1996	(Indonesia) Yayuk Basuki (Japan) Kyōko Nagatsuka (2)	(Australia) Kerry-Anne Guse (South Korea) Park Sung-hee	7–6^{(9–7)}, 6–3
1997	(Japan) Naoko Kijimuta (Japan) Nana Miyagi	(Germany) Barbara Rittner (Belgium) Dominique Monami	6–3, 6–1
1998	(Spain) Virginia Ruano Pascual (Argentina) Paola Suárez	(France) Julie Halard-Decugis (Slovakia) Janette Husárová	7–6^{(8–6)}, 6–3
1999	(South Africa) Mariaan de Swardt (Ukraine) Elena Tatarkova	(France) Alexia Dechaume-Balleret (France) Émilie Loit	6–2, 6–2
2000	(Italy) Rita Grande (France) Émilie Loit	(Belgium) Kim Clijsters (Australia) Alicia Molik	6–2, 2–6, 6–3
2001	(Zimbabwe) Cara Black (Russia) Elena Likhovtseva	(Romania) Ruxandra Dragomir (Spain) Virginia Ruano Pascual	6–4, 6–1
2002	(Italy) Tathiana Garbin (Italy) Rita Grande (2)	(Australia) Catherine Barclay-Reitz (Australia) Christina Wheeler	6–2, 7–6^{(7–3)}
2003	(Zimbabwe) Cara Black (2) (Russia) Elena Likhovtseva (2)	(Austria) Barbara Schett (Austria) Patricia Wartusch	7–5, 7–6^{(7–1)}
2004	(Japan) Shinobu Asagoe (Japan) Seiko Okamoto	(Belgium) Els Callens (Austria) Barbara Schett	2–6, 6–4, 6–3
2005	(China) Yan Zi (China) Zheng Jie	(Spain) Anabel Medina Garrigues (Russia) Dinara Safina	6–4, 7–5
2006	(France) Émilie Loit (2) (Australia) Nicole Pratt	(United States) Jill Craybas (Croatia) Jelena Kostanić	6–2, 6–1
2007	(Russia) Elena Likhovtseva (3) (Russia) Elena Vesnina	(Spain) Anabel Medina Garrigues (Spain) Virginia Ruano Pascual	2–6, 6–1, 6–2
2008	(Spain) Anabel Medina Garrigues (Spain) Virginia Ruano Pascual (2)	(Greece) Eleni Daniilidou (Germany) Jasmin Wöhr	6–2, 6–4
2009	(Argentina) Gisela Dulko (Italy) Flavia Pennetta	(Ukraine) Alona Bondarenko (Ukraine) Kateryna Bondarenko	6–2, 7–6^{(7–4)}
2010	(Chinese Taipei) Chuang Chia-jung (Czech Republic) Květa Peschke	(Chinese Taipei) Chan Yung-jan (Romania) Monica Niculescu	3–6, 6–3, [10–7]
2011	(Italy) Sara Errani (Italy) Roberta Vinci	(Ukraine) Kateryna Bondarenko (Latvia) Līga Dekmeijere	6–3, 7–5
2012	(Romania) Irina-Camelia Begu (Romania) Monica Niculescu	(Chinese Taipei) Chuang Chia-jung (New Zealand) Marina Erakovic	6–7^{(4–7)}, 7–6^{(7–4)}, [10–5]
2013	(Spain) Garbiñe Muguruza (Spain) María Teresa Torró Flor	(Hungary) Tímea Babos (Luxembourg) Mandy Minella	6–3, 7–6^{(7–5)}
2014	(Romania) Monica Niculescu (2) (Czech Republic) Klára Zakopalová	(United States) Lisa Raymond (China) Zhang Shuai	6–2, 6–7^{(5–7)}, [10–8]
2015	(Netherlands) Kiki Bertens (Sweden) Johanna Larsson	(Russia) Vitalia Diatchenko (Romania) Monica Niculescu	7–5, 6–3
2016	(China) Han Xinyun (United States) Christina McHale	(Australia) Kimberly Birrell (Australia) Jarmila Wolfe	6–3, 6–0
2017	(Romania) Raluca Olaru (Ukraine) Olga Savchuk	(Canada) Gabriela Dabrowski (China) Yang Zhaoxuan	0–6, 6–4, [10–5]
2018	(Belgium) Elise Mertens (Netherlands) Demi Schuurs	(Ukraine) Lyudmyla Kichenok (Japan) Makoto Ninomiya	6–2, 6–2
2019	(Chinese Taipei) Chan Hao-ching (Chinese Taipei) Latisha Chan	(Belgium) Kirsten Flipkens (Sweden) Johanna Larsson	6–3, 3–6, [10–6]
2020	(Ukraine) Nadiia Kichenok (India) Sania Mirza	(China) Peng Shuai (China) Zhang Shuai	6–4, 6–4
2021	not held		
2022	not held		
2023	(Belgium) Kirsten Flipkens (Germany) Laura Siegemund	(Switzerland) Viktorija Golubic (Hungary) Panna Udvardy	6–4, 7–5
2024	(Chinese Taipei) Chan Hao-ching (2) (Mexico) Giuliana Olmos	(China) Guo Hanyu (China) Jiang Xinyu	6–3, 6–3
2025	(China) Jiang Xinyu (Chinese Taipei) Wu Fang-hsien	(Romania) Monica Niculescu (Hungary) Fanny Stollár	6–1, 7–6^{(8–6)}
2026	(Poland) Katarzyna Piter (Indonesia) Janice Tjen	(Belgium) Magali Kempen (Czech Republic) Anna Sisková	6–2, 6–2

== See also ==
- List of events in Tasmania
- List of tennis tournaments
