= Heather Watson career statistics =

Career finals
Discipline	Type	Won	Lost	Total
Singles	Grand Slam	–	–	–
Singles	Olympics	–	–	–
Singles	WTA Finals	–	–	–
Singles	WTA 1000	–	–	–
Singles	WTA 500 and 250	4	1	5
Singles	Total	4	1	5
Doubles	Grand Slam	–	–	–
Doubles	Olympics	–	–	–
Doubles	WTA Finals	–	–	–
Doubles	WTA 1000	–	–	–
Doubles	WTA 500 and 250	5	9	14
Doubles	Total	5	9	14
Mixed doubles	Grand Slam	1	1	2
Mixed doubles	Summer Olympics	–	–	–
Mixed doubles	Total	1	1	2
Total		10	11	21

Heather Watson is a professional tennis player who has been ranked as high as No. 38 in the WTA rankings.

Watson made her professional tennis debut on the ITF Women's Circuit at The Jersey International in 2009. She has reached two Grand Slam finals, winning the mixed doubles at the 2016 Wimbledon Championships. So far in her career, Watson has won twelve singles titles. This total includes four WTA Tour titles and eight titles on the ITF Circuit. She also has won five doubles titles and the girls' singles title at the US Open.

In 2012, Watson won her first career titles, both in singles and doubles. With victories at the Bank of the West Classic and the Texas Tennis Open in women's doubles, as well as a singles victory at the HP Open, Watson became the first British woman to win a WTA Tour title since Jo Durie in the 1990s. This also gave her career-high rankings in both variations of competition.

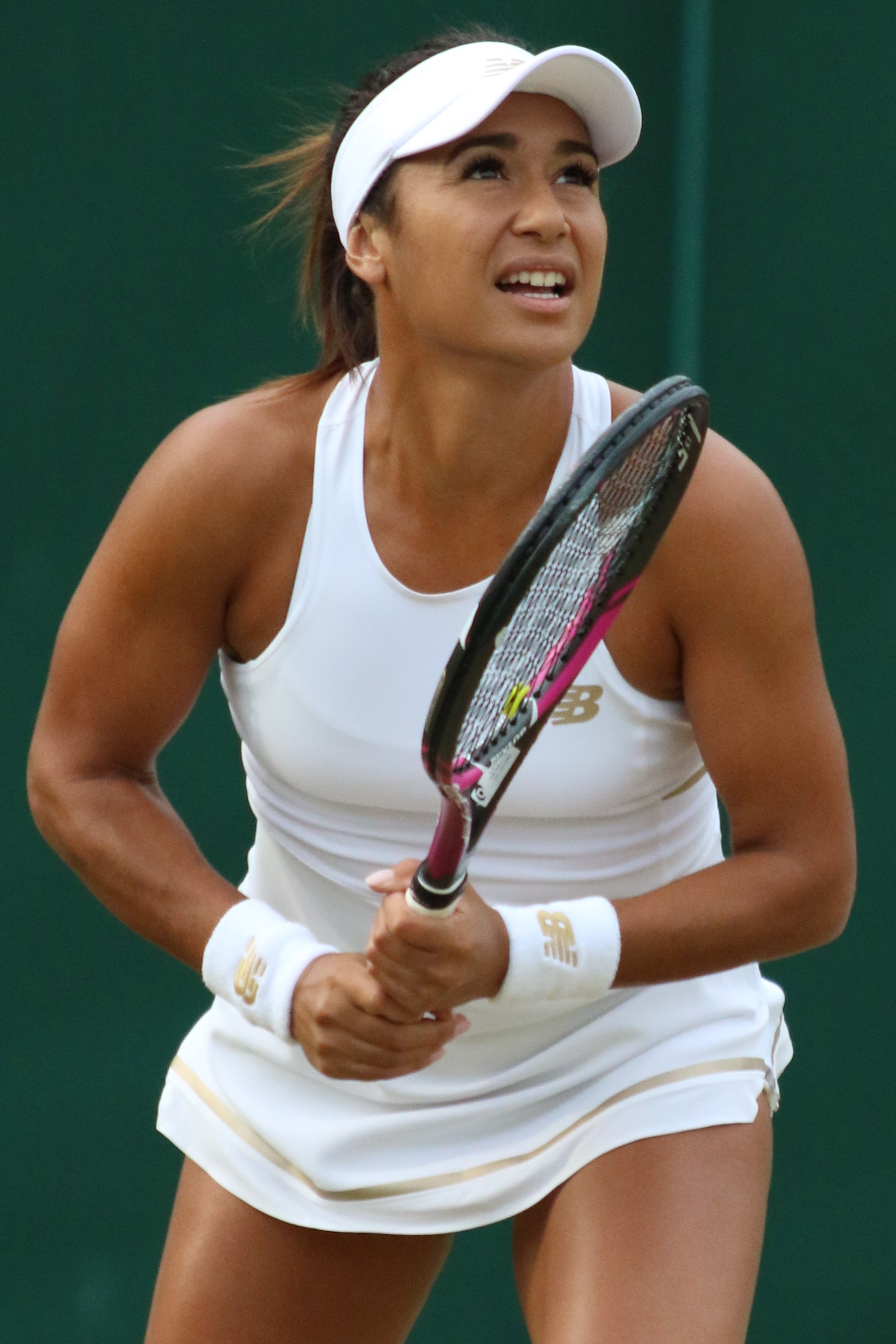
Watson at the 2019 Wimbledon Championships

== Performance timelines ==
Key
W	F	SF	QF	#R	RR	Q#	P#	DNQ	A	Z#	PO	G	S	B	NMS	NTI	P	NH

(W) winner; (F) finalist; (SF) semifinalist; (QF) quarterfinalist; (#R) rounds 4, 3, 2, 1; (RR) round-robin stage; (Q#) qualification round; (P#) preliminary round; (DNQ) did not qualify; (A) absent; (Z#) Davis/Fed Cup Zonal Group (with number indication) or (PO) play-off; (G) gold, (S) silver or (B) bronze Olympic/Paralympic medal; (NMS) not a Masters tournament; (NTI) not a Tier I tournament; (P) postponed; (NH) not held; (SR) strike rate (events won / competed); (W–L) win–loss record.
To avoid confusion and double counting, these charts are updated at the conclusion of a tournament or when the player's participation has ended.

Only main-draw results in WTA Tour, Grand Slam tournaments, Fed Cup/Billie Jean King Cup and Olympic Games are included in win–loss records.

=== Singles ===
Current after the 2024 Nottingham Open.

Tournament	2010	2011	2012	2013	2014	2015	2016	2017	2018	2019	2020	2021	2022	2023	2024	SR	W–L	Win %
Grand Slam tournaments
Australian Open	A	Q2	1R	3R	1R	1R	1R	2R	1R	1R	2R	2R	2R	Q1	Q1	0 / 11	6–11	35%
French Open	A	2R	2R	1R	2R	2R	2R	Q3	2R	Q2	1R	1R	1R	Q1	Q1	0 / 10	6–10	38%
Wimbledon	1R	1R	3R	1R	2R	3R	1R	3R	1R	2R	NH	1R	4R	1R	1R	0 / 14	11–14	44%
US Open	Q1	1R	1R	1R	1R	1R	1R	1R	1R	Q1	1R	1R	Q3	Q1	Q2	0 / 10	0–10	0%
Win–loss	0–1	1–3	3–4	2–4	2–4	3–4	1–4	3–3	1–4	1–2	1–3	1–4	4–3	0–1	0–1	0 / 45	23–45	34%
National representation
Summer Olympics	NH		2R	NH			2R	NH				1R	NH		A	0 / 2	2–2	50%
Billie Jean King Cup (Note: Formerly known as Fed Cup until 2020.)	A	Z1	Z1 PO	Z1 PO	Z1	Z1	Z1	Z1 PO	Z1 PO	PO	PO (Note: Edition is split into the two years due to COVID-19.)		SF	PO	SF	0 / 2	23–12	66%
WTA 1000
Dubai / Qatar Open (Note: The first Premier 5 event of the year has switched back and forth between the Dubai Tennis Championships and the Qatar Ladies Open since 2009. Dubai was classified as a Premier 5 event from 2009 to 2011 before being succeeded by Doha for the 2012–2014 period. In 2015, Dubai regained its Premier 5 status while Doha was demoted to Premier status. The Premier 5 tournaments were reclassified as WTA 1000 tournaments in 2021.)	A	A	Q2	A	A	1R	A	A	A	A	A	A	Q1	A	A	0 / 1	0–1	0%
Indian Wells Open	A	Q1	Q1	1R	2R	4R	2R	2R	1R	Q1	NH	1R	1R	A	Q1	0 / 7	6–7	47%
Miami Open	1R	1R	3R	1R	1R	2R	4R	1R	1R	Q1	NH	1R	3R	Q1	Q1	0 / 11	8–11	42%
Madrid Open	A	A	A	A	A	1R	1R	A	A	A	NH	Q1	Q2	A	A	0 / 2	0–2	0%
Italian Open	A	Q2	A	A	A	2R	2R	A	A	A	A	Q1	A	A	Q1	0 / 2	2–2	50%
Canadian Open	A	Q2	A	Q1	3R	2R	1R	1R	A	Q2	NH	Q2	Q1	A	A	0 / 4	3–4	43%
Cincinnati Open	A	A	A	Q2	1R	1R	A	Q1	A	A	1R	2R	A	A	A	0 / 4	1–4	20%
Pan Pac. / Wuhan Open (Note: In 2014, the Pan Pacific Open was downgraded to a Premier event and replaced by the Wuhan Open. The Premier 5 tournaments were reclassified as WTA 1000 tournaments in 2021.)	A	A	2R	Q2	1R	1R	1R	Q2	A	Q1	NH			A	A	0 / 4	1–4	20%
China Open	A	A	Q2	1R	1R	Q2	Q1	Q1	Q2	Q2	NH			A	Q2	0 / 2	0–2	0%
Career statistics
Tournaments	5	11	18	16	17	20	20	15	17	9	9	16	12	15	12		Career total: 216	
Titles	0	0	1	0	0	1	1	0	0	0	1	0	0	0	0		Career total: 4	
Finals	0	0	1	0	0	1	1	0	0	1	1	0	0	0	0	Career total: 5		
Overall win–loss	1–5	10–11	18–17	9–16	8–17	18–19	16–19	13–15	10–17	5–9	10–9	8–17	10–13	13–12	9–12	4 / 188	146–196	43%
Win (%)	17%	48%	51%	36%	32%	49%	46%	46%	37%	36%	53%	32%	43%	46%	43%	Career total: 54%		
Year-end ranking (Note: WTA year-end ranking for 2009 was 588)	176	92	49	119	50	54	77	74	101	92	59	73	133	169	140	$5,502,676		

=== Doubles ===
Tournament	2010	2011	2012	2013	2014	2015	2016	2017	2018	2019	2020	2021	2022	SR	W–L	Win %
Grand Slam tournaments
Australian Open	A	A	A	1R	A	2R	2R	1R	1R	1R	A	3R	2R	0 / 8	5–8	38%
French Open	A	A	A	1R	A	1R	1R	1R	2R	1R	1R	1R	2R	0 / 9	2–9	10%
Wimbledon	2R	1R	1R	1R	1R	2R	3R	2R	QF	1R	NH	3R	3R	0 / 12	11–12	48%
US Open	A	A	1R	1R	1R	A	2R	1R	1R	A	A	A	A	0 / 6	1–6	14%
Win–loss	1–1	0–1	0–2	0–4	0–2	2–3	4–4	1–4	3–4	0–3	0–1	4–3	4–3	0 / 35	19–35	35%
National representation
Summer Olympics	NH		1R	NH			2R	NH				A	NH	0 / 2	1–2	33%
Billie Jean King Cup	A	Z1	Z1-PO	Z1-PO	Z1	Z1	Z1	Z1-PO	Z1-PO	PO	PO (Note: Edition is split into the two years due to COVID-19.)		SF	0 / 1	8–3	73%
Career statistics
Titles	0	0	2	0	1	0	0	0	1	0	0	0	0	Career total: 4		
Finals	0	0	4	0	1	0	1	0	2	1	0	1	0	Career total: 10		
Year-end ranking	254	172	52	135	131	102	72	123	50	113	163	112	115			

=== Mixed doubles ===
Tournament	2011	2012	2013	2014	2015	2016	2017	2018	2019	2020	2021	2022	SR	W–L	Win %
Australian Open	A	A	A	A	A	A	A	A	A	A	A	A	0 / 0	0–0	–
French Open	A	A	1R	A	A	A	A	A	A	NH	A	A	0 / 1	0–1	0%
Wimbledon	2R	2R	2R	1R	1R	W	F	3R	2R	NH	1R	A	1 / 10	14–9	61%
US Open	A	A	A	A	A	A	1R	A	A	NH	A	A	0 / 1	0–1	0%
Win–loss	1–1	1–1	1–2	0–1	0–1	4–0	5–2	1–1	1–1	0–0	0–1	0–0	1 / 12	14–11	56%
National representation
Summer Olympics	NH	A	NH			QF	NH				A	NH	0 / 1	1–1	50%

== Grand Slam tournaments ==
=== Mixed doubles: 2 (1 title, 1 runner-up) ===
Result	Year	Tournament	Surface	Partner	Opponent	Score
Win	2016	Wimbledon	Grass	(Finland) Henri Kontinen	(Colombia) Robert Farah (Germany) Anna-Lena Grönefeld	7–6^{(7–5)}, 6–4
Loss	2017	Wimbledon	Grass	(Finland) Henri Kontinen	(United Kingdom) Jamie Murray (Switzerland) Martina Hingis	4–6, 4–6

== WTA Tour finals ==
=== Singles: 5 (4 titles, 1 runner-up) ===
Legend WTA 500 WTA 250 (4–1)	Finals by surface Hard (4–1) Grass (0–0)	Finals by setting Outdoors (4–1) Indoors (0–0)

Result	W–L	Date	Tournament	Tier	Surface	Opponent	Score
Win	1–0	Oct 2012	Japan Women's Open, Japan	International (Note: The WTA International tournaments were reclassified as WTA 250 tournaments in 2021.)	Hard	(Chinese Taipei) Chang Kai-chen	7–5, 5–7, 7–6^{(7–4)}
Win	2–0	Jan 2015	Hobart International, Australia	International	Hard	(United States) Madison Brengle	6–3, 6–4
Win	3–0	Mar 2016	Monterrey Open, Mexico	International	Hard	(Belgium) Kirsten Flipkens	3–6, 6–2, 6–3
Loss	3–1	Oct 2019	Tianjin Open, China	International	Hard	(Sweden) Rebecca Peterson	4–6, 4–6
Win	4–1	Feb 2020	Abierto Mexicano, Mexico	International	Hard	(Canada) Leylah Fernandez	6–4, 6–7^{(8–10)}, 6–1

=== Doubles: 14 (5 titles, 9 runner-ups) ===
Legend WTA 500 (1–2) WTA 250 (4–7)	Finals by surface Hard (5–7) Grass (0–2)	Finals by setting Outdoors (4–4) Indoors (0–2)

Result	W–L	Date	Tournament	Tier	Surface	Partner	Opponents	Score
Win	1–0	Jul 2012	Silicon Valley Classic, US	Premier (Note: The WTA Premier tournaments were reclassified as WTA 500 tournaments in 2021.)	Hard	(New Zealand) Marina Erakovic	(Australia) Jarmila Gajdošová (United States) Vania King	7–5, 7–6^{(9–7)}
Win	2–0	Aug 2012	Texas Open, US	International	Hard	(New Zealand) Marina Erakovic	(Latvia) Līga Dekmeijere (United States) Irina Falconi	6–3, 6–0
Loss	2–1	Sep 2012	Tournoi de Québec, Canada	International	Hard (i)	(Poland) Alicja Rosolska	(Germany) Tatjana Malek (France) Kristina Mladenovic	6–7^{(5–7)}, 7–6^{(8–6)}, [7–10]
Loss	2–2	Oct 2012	Japan Women's Open, Japan	International	Hard	(Japan) Kimiko Date-Krumm	(United States) Raquel Kops-Jones (United States) Abigail Spears	1–6, 4–6
Win	3–2	Jul 2014	Baku Cup, Azerbaijan	International	Hard	(Russia) Alexandra Panova	(Romania) Raluca Olaru (Israel) Shahar Pe'er	6–2, 7–6^{(7–3)}
Loss	3–3	Oct 2016	Hong Kong Open, China SAR	International	Hard	(United Kingdom) Naomi Broady	(Chinese Taipei) Chan Hao-ching (Chinese Taipei) Chan Yung-jan	3–6, 1–6
Win	4–3	Mar 2018	Abierto Mexicano, Mexico	International	Hard	(Germany) Tatjana Maria	(United States) Kaitlyn Christian (United States) Sabrina Santamaria	7–5, 2–6, [10–2]
Loss	4–4	Jun 2018	Nottingham Open, UK	International	Grass	(Romania) Mihaela Buzărnescu	(Poland) Alicja Rosolska (United States) Abigail Spears	3–6, 6–7^{(5–7)}
Loss	4–5	Feb 2019	Hungarian Ladies Open, Hungary	International	Hard (i)	(Hungary) Fanny Stollár	(Russia) Ekaterina Alexandrova (Russia) Vera Zvonareva	4–6, 6–4, [7–10]
Loss	4–6	Mar 2021	Monterrey Open, Mexico	WTA 250	Hard	(China) Zheng Saisai	(United States) Caroline Dolehide (United States) Asia Muhammad	2–6, 3–6
Loss	4–7	Jun 2023	Nottingham Open, UK	WTA 250	Grass	(United Kingdom) Harriet Dart	(Norway) Ulrikke Eikeri (Estonia) Ingrid Neel	6–7^{(6–8)}, 7–5, [8–10]
Win	5–7	Jul 2023	Poland Open, Poland	WTA 250	Hard	(Belgium) Yanina Wickmayer	(Poland) Weronika Falkowska (Poland) Katarzyna Piter	6–4, 6–4
Loss	5–8	Jan 2024	Brisbane International, Australia	WTA 500	Hard	(Belgium) Greet Minnen	(Ukraine) Lyudmyla Kichenok (Latvia) Jeļena Ostapenko	5–7, 2–6
Loss	5–9	Feb 2024	Abu Dhabi Open, UAE	WTA 500	Hard	(Czech Republic) Linda Nosková	(United States) Sofia Kenin (United States) Bethanie Mattek-Sands	4–6, 6–7^{(4–7)}

== WTA 125 finals ==
=== Doubles: 2 (2 runner-ups) ===
Result	W–L	Date	Tournament	Surface	Partner	Opponents	Score
Loss	0–1	Oct 2023	Abierto Tampico, Mexico	Hard	(United States) Sabrina Santamaria	Kamilla Rakhimova; Anastasia Tikhonova	6–7^{(5–7)}, 2–6
Loss	0–2	Dec 2023	Andorrà Open, Andorra	Hard (i)	(Hungary) Tímea Babos	Erika Andreeva (Switzerland) Céline Naef	1–6, 2–6

== ITF Circuit finals ==
=== Singles: 17 (8 titles, 9 runner-ups) ===
Legend $100,000 tournaments (3–3) $75,000 tournaments (0–1) $60/75,000 tournaments (2–1) $40/50,000 tournaments (1–3) $25,000 tournaments (1–1) $10,000 tournaments (1–0)	Finals by surface Hard (5–8) Clay (1–0) Grass (1–1) Carpet (1–0)	Finals by setting Outdoors (5–5) Indoors (3–3)

Result	W–L	Date	Tournament	Tier	Surface	Opponent	Score
Win	1–0	Jul 2009	ITF Frinton, UK	10,000	Grass	(United Kingdom) Anna Fitzpatrick	4–6, 6–4, 6–2
Win	2–0	Jul 2010	ITF Wrexham, UK	25,000	Hard	(India) Sania Mirza	6–2, 6–4
Win	3–0	Nov 2010	ITF Toronto, Canada	50,000	Hard (i)	(France) Alizé Lim	6–3, 6–3
Loss	3–1	Sep 2011	GB Pro-Series Shrewsbury, UK	75,000	Hard	(Germany) Mona Barthel	0–6, 3–6
Win	4–1	Feb 2014	Midland Tennis Classic, US	100,000	Hard (i)	(Russia) Ksenia Pervak	6–4, 6–0
Win	5–1	May 2014	Prague Open, Czech Republic	100,000	Clay	(Slovakia) Anna Karolína Schmiedlová	7–6^{(7–5)}, 6–0
Loss	5–2	Jun 2017	Surbiton Trophy, UK	100,000	Grass	(Slovakia) Magdaléna Rybáriková	4–6, 5–7
Loss	5–3	Aug 2018	Vancouver Open, Canada	100,000	Hard	(Japan) Misaki Doi	7–6^{(7–4)}, 1–6, 4–6
Win	6–3	May 2019	Fukuoka International, Japan	60,000	Carpet	(Kazakhstan) Zarina Diyas	7–6^{(7–1)}, 7–6^{(7–4)}
Win	7–3	Aug 2019	Vancouver Open, Canada	100,000	Hard	(Spain) Sara Sorribes Tormo	7–5, 6–4
Loss	7–4	Oct 2022	GB Pro-Series Glasgow, UK	60,000	Hard (i)	(United Kingdom) Yuriko Miyazaki	7–5, 6–7^{(5–7)}, 2–6
Loss	7–5	Feb 2023	GB Pro-Series Glasgow, UK	25,000	Hard (i)	(Belgium) Marie Benoît	6–3, 4–6, 1–6
Loss	7–6	Apr 2023	ITF Calvi, France	40,000+H	Hard	(Italy) Lucrezia Stefanini	2–6, 6–3, 3–6
Loss	7–7	Feb 2024	ITF Roehampton, UK	50,000	Hard (i)	(Switzerland) Lulu Sun	5–7, 5–7
Win	8–7	Jul 2024	GB Pro-Series Nottingham, UK	50,000	Hard	(France) Manon Léonard	6–3, 6–0
Loss	8–8	Oct 2024	GB Pro-Series Shrewsbury, United Kingdom	W100	Hard (i)	(United Kingdom) Sonay Kartal	5–7, 1–4 ret.
Loss	8–9	Nov 2026	Keio Challenger, Japan	W50	Hard	(Japan) Kyōka Okamura	4–6, 4–6

=== Doubles: 8 (5 titles, 3 runner-ups) ===
Legend $100,000 tournaments (3–1) $75,000 tournaments (0–1) $60,000 tournaments (1–0) $40,000 tournaments (1–0) $25,000 tournaments (0–1)	Finals by surface Hard (3–1) Clay (1–0) Grass (0–2) Carpet (1–0)	Finals by setting Outdoors (4–3) Indoors (1–0)

Result	W–L	Date	Tournament	Tier	Surface	Partner	Opponents	Score
Loss	0–1	Mar 2012	ITF Clearwater, US	25,000	Hard	(United Kingdom) Naomi Broady	(Georgia (country)) Ekaterine Gorgodze (Ukraine) Alyona Sotnikova	3–6, 2–6
Loss	0–2	Jun 2012	Nottingham Trophy, UK	75,000	Grass	(United Kingdom) Laura Robson	(Greece) Eleni Daniilidou (Australia) Casey Dellacqua	4–6, 2–6
Win	1–2	Feb 2014	Midland Classic, US	100,000	Hard (i)	(Georgia (country)) Anna Tatishvili	(Canada) Sharon Fichman (United States) Maria Sanchez	7–5, 5–7, [10–6]
Win	2–2	May 2017	Empire Slovak Open, Slovakia	100,000	Clay	(United Kingdom) Naomi Broady	(Chinese Taipei) Chuang Chia-jung (Czech Republic) Renata Voráčová	6–3, 6–2
Win	3–2	May 2019	Fukuoka International, Japan	60,000	Carpet	(United Kingdom) Naomi Broady	(United States) Kristie Ahn (Australia) Alison Bai	w/o
Loss	3–3	Jun 2019	Surbiton Trophy, UK	100,000	Grass	(Belgium) Yanina Wickmayer	(United States) Jennifer Brady (Australia) Caroline Dolehide	3–6, 4–6
Win	4–3	Oct 2023	ITF Quinta do Lago, Portugal	40,000	Hard	(Australia) Olivia Gadecki	(Portugal) Francisca Jorge (Portugal) Matilde Jorge	6–4, 6–1
Win	5–3	May 2026	Kangaroo Cup, Japan	100,000	Hard	(United Kingdom) Harriet Dart	(United States) Catherine Harrison (United States) Dalayna Hewitt	3–6, 6–3, [10–4]

== Junior Grand Slam tournament finals ==
=== Singles: 1 (title) ===
Result	Year	Tournament	Surface	Opponent	Score
Win	2009	US Open	Hard	(Russia) Yana Buchina	6–4, 6–1

=== Doubles: 1 (runner-up) ===
Result	Year	Tournament	Surface	Partner	Opponents	Score
Loss	2009	French Open	Clay	(Hungary) Tímea Babos	(Romania) Elena Bogdan (Thailand) Noppawan Lertcheewakarn	6–3, 3–6, [8–10]

== Fed Cup participation ==
Great Britain Fed Cup team. This table is current through the 2020–21 Billie Jean King Cup.

Legend
World Group Play-off / Finals Qualifying Round (1–1)
World Group 2 Play-off / Finals Play-off (2–6)
Zone Group (27–7)

=== Singles (22–11) ===
Edition	Round	Date	Location	Against	Surface	Opponent	W/L	Result
2011	Z1 RR	Feb 2011	Eilat (ISR)	Switzerland	Hard	Timea Bacsinszky	L	1–6, 3–6
2011	Z1 RR	Feb 2011	Eilat (ISR)	Denmark	Hard	Karen Barbat	W	6–0, 6–1
2011	Z1 RR	Feb 2011	Eilat (ISR)	Croatia	Hard	Silvia Njirić	W	6–2, 7–5
2013	Z1 RR	Feb 2013	Eilat (ISR)	(Bosnia and Herzegovina) BiH	Hard	Anita Husarić	W	6–3, 6–4
2013	Z1 RR	Feb 2013	Eilat (ISR)	Portugal	Hard	Michelle Larcher de Brito	L	1–6, 4–6
2013	Z1 RR	Feb 2013	Eilat (ISR)	Hungary	Hard	Tímea Babos	W	6–3, 6–2
2013	Z1 RR	Feb 2013	Eilat (ISR)	Bulgaria	Hard	Tsvetana Pironkova	W	1–6, 6–4, 6–2
2014	Z1 RR	Feb 2014	Budapest (HUN)	Latvia	Hard (i)	Jeļena Ostapenko	W	7–5, 6–1
2014	Z1 RR	Feb 2014	Budapest (HUN)	Romania	Hard (i)	Sorana Cîrstea	W	6–7^{(7–9)}, 6–1, 6–4
2014	Z1 RR	Feb 2014	Budapest (HUN)	Hungary	Hard (i)	Réka-Luca Jani	W	6–4, 6–1
2014	Z1 RR	Feb 2014	Budapest (HUN)	Austria	Hard (i)	Yvonne Meusburger	W	6–4, 6–2
2015	Z1 RR	Feb 2015	Budapest (HUN)	Liechtenstein	Hard (i)	Stephanie Vogt	W	6–2, 6–3
2015	Z1 RR	Feb 2015	Budapest (HUN)	Turkey	Hard (i)	Çağla Büyükakçay	L	2–6, 6–3, 5–7
2015	Z1 RR	Feb 2015	Budapest (HUN)	Ukraine	Hard (i)	Elina Svitolina	W	2–6, 7–5, 6–4
2015	Z1 PO	Feb 2015	Budapest (HUN)	Belarus	Hard (i)	Victoria Azarenka	L	4–6, 1–6
2016	Z1 RR	Feb 2016	Eilat (ISR)	(Georgia (country)) Georgia	Hard (i)	Sofia Shapatava	W	6–2, 6–0
2016	Z1 RR	Feb 2016	Eilat (ISR)	South Africa	Hard (i)	Chanel Simmonds	W	6–3, 6–3
2016	Z1 PO	Feb 2016	Eilat (ISR)	Belgium	Hard (i)	Alison Van Uytvanck	L	4–6, 6–3, 4–6
2017	Z1 RR	Feb 2017	Tallinn (EST)	Portugal	Hard (i)	Inês Murta	W	6–1, 6–1
2017	Z1 RR	Feb 2017	Tallinn (EST)	Latvia	Hard (i)	Diāna Marcinkēviča	W	6–3, 6–0
2017	Z1 RR	Feb 2017	Tallinn (EST)	Turkey	Hard (i)	İpek Soylu	W	6–0, 6–1
2017	Z1 PO	Feb 2017	Tallinn (EST)	Croatia	Hard (i)	Donna Vekić	W	6–2, 6–4
2017	WG2 PO	Apr 2017	Constanța (ROU)	Romania	Clay	Simona Halep	L	4–6, 1–6
2017	WG2 PO	Apr 2017	Constanța (ROU)	Romania	Clay	Irina-Camelia Begu	L	4–6, 5–7
2018	Z1 RR	Feb 2018	Tallinn (EST)	Portugal	Hard (i)	Francisca Jorge	W	6–4, 6–2
2018	Z1 RR	Feb 2018	Tallinn (EST)	Estonia	Hard (i)	Katriin Saar	W	6–1, 6–1
2018	Z1 PO	Feb 2018	Tallinn (EST)	Hungary	Hard (i)	Dalma Gálfi	W	3–6, 6–1, 6–4
2018	WG2 PO	Apr 2018	Miki (JPN)	Japan	Hard (i)	Naomi Osaka	L	2–6, 3–6
2018	WG2 PO	Apr 2018	Miki (JPN)	Japan	Hard (i)	Kurumi Nara	L	6–7^{(7–9)}, 4–6
2020–21	F QR	Feb 2020	Bratislava (SVK)	Slovakia	Clay (i)	Anna Karolína Schmiedlová	L	2–6, 3–6
2020–21	F QR	Feb 2020	Bratislava (SVK)	Slovakia	Clay (i)	Rebecca Šramková	W	6–0, 7–5
2020–21	F PO	Apr 2021	London (GBR)	Mexico	Hard (i)	Giuliana Olmos	W	7–5, 6–1
2020–21	F PO	Apr 2021	London (GBR)	Mexico	Hard (i)	Marcela Zacarías	L	3–6, 6–7^{(1–7)}

=== Doubles (8–3) ===
Edition	Round	Date	Location	Against	Surface	Partner	Opponents	W/L	Result
2011	Z1 RR	Feb 2011	Eilat (ISR)	Switzerland	Hard	Jocelyn Rae	Timea Bacsinszky; Amra Sadiković	W	6–4, 6–3
2011	Z1 RR	Feb 2011	Eilat (ISR)	Denmark	Hard	Jocelyn Rae	Mai Grage; Caroline Wozniacki	W	5–7, 7–5, 7–5
2012	Z1 RR	Feb 2012	Eilat (ISR)	Portugal	Hard	Laura Robson	Maria João Koehler; Michelle Larcher de Brito	W	7–5, 6–0
2012	Z1 RR	Feb 2012	Eilat (ISR)	Netherlands	Hard	Laura Robson	Kiki Bertens; Bibiane Schoofs	W	7–5, 7–6^{(7–5)}
2012	Z1 RR	Feb 2012	Eilat (ISR)	Israel	Hard	Laura Robson	Julia Glushko; Keren Shlomo	W	6–2, 6–1
2012	WG2 PO	Apr 2012	Borås (SWE)	Sweden	Hard (i)	Elena Baltacha	Ellen Allgurin; Hilda Melander	W	7–6^{(7–3)}, 6–1
2013	Z1 RR	Feb 2013	Eilat (ISR)	Portugal	Hard	Laura Robson	Michelle Larcher de Brito; Joana Valle Costa	W	6–2, 6–1
2014	Z1 RR	Feb 2015	Budapest (HUN)	Latvia	Hard	Jocelyn Rae	Diāna Marcinkēviča; Jeļena Ostapenko	L	6–1, 5–7, 6–7^{(5–7)}
2014	Z1 RR	Feb 2015	Budapest (HUN)	Romania	Hard	Jocelyn Rae	Irina-Camelia Begu; Monica Niculescu	L	0–6, 2–6
2017	Z1 PO	Feb 2017	Tallinn (EST)	Croatia	Hard (i)	Johanna Konta	Darija Jurak; Ana Konjuh	W	4–6, 6–4, 6–3
2018	WG2 PO	Apr 2018	Miki (JPN)	Japan	Hard (i)	Johanna Konta	Miyu Kato; Makoto Ninomiya	L	6–3, 3–6, 3–6

== Record against top 10 players ==
#	Player	Rank	Event	Surface	Rd	Score
2015
1.	(Poland) Agnieszka Radwańska	No. 8	Indian Wells Open, US	Hard	3R	6–4, 6–4
2017
2.	(Slovakia) Dominika Cibulková	No. 9	Eastbourne International, UK	Grass	2R	7–5, 6–4
