= 2014 Hobart International – Doubles =

Doubles
- 2014 Hobart International

Final
- Champions: (Romania) Monica Niculescu (Czech Republic) Klára Zakopalová
- Runners-up: (United States) Lisa Raymond (China) Zhang Shuai
- Score: 6–2, 6–7^{(5–7)}, [10–8]

Events
Singles	Doubles
← 2013 ·	Hobart International	· 2015 →

Garbiñe Muguruza and María Teresa Torró Flor were the defending champions, but decided not to participate.
Monica Niculescu and Klára Zakopalová won the title, defeating Lisa Raymond and Zhang Shuai in the final 6–2, 6–7^{(5–7)}, [10–8].

== Seeds ==
1. (New Zealand) Marina Erakovic / (China) Zheng Jie (first round)
2. (United States) Lisa Raymond / (China) Zhang Shuai (final)
3. (Ukraine) Irina Buryachok / (Georgia (country)) Oksana Kalashnikova (quarterfinals)
4. (Chinese Taipei) Chan Yung-jan / (Slovakia) Janette Husárová (semifinal)

== Draw ==
=== Key ===
- Q = Qualifier
- WC = Wild card
- LL = Lucky loser
- Alt = Alternate
- SE = Special exempt
- PR = Protected ranking
- ITF = ITF entry
- JE = Junior exempt
- w/o = Walkover
- r = Retired
- d = Defaulted
- SR = Special ranking

=== Draw ===
First round
1	(New Zealand) M Erakovic (China) J Zheng	5	5
(Romania) M Niculescu (Czech Republic) K Zakopalová	7	7
(Japan) S Aoyama (Japan) M Miyamura	3	6	[10]
(Chinese Taipei) C-j Chuang (Czech Republic) E Hrdinová	6	3	[7]
4	(Chinese Taipei) Y-j Chan (Slovakia) J Husárová	6	6
(Georgia (country)) S Shapatava (Ukraine) A Vasylyeva	4	1
(Spain) L Domínguez Lino (Colombia) M Duque	7^{8}	6
(Romania) A Cadanțu (Austria) S Klemenschits	6^{6}	4
WC	(Australia) O Rogowska (Australia) S Sanders	2	6	[9]
(Spain) L Arruabarrena (Spain) S Soler Espinosa	6	2	[11]
(South Africa) N Grandin (United States) A Riske	6	4	[4]
3	(Ukraine) I Buryachok (Georgia (country)) O Kalashnikova	4	6	[10]
(Bulgaria) A Naydenova (Brazil) T Pereira	6^{8}	6	[10]
(Chinese Taipei) C-w Chan (China) Y Xu	7^{10}	2	[8]
WC	(Australia) K Birrell (Australia) O Tjandramulia	3	2
2	(United States) L Raymond (China) S Zhang	6	6

Quarterfinals
(Romania) M Niculescu (Czech Republic) K Zakopalová	6	4	[10]
(Japan) S Aoyama (Japan) M Miyamura	2	6	[5]
4	(Chinese Taipei) Y-j Chan (Slovakia) J Husárová	7^{7}	2	[10]
(Spain) L Domínguez Lino (Colombia) M Duque	6^{2}	6	[8]
(Spain) L Arruabarrena (Spain) S Soler Espinosa	7	6
3	(Ukraine) I Buryachok (Georgia (country)) O Kalashnikova	5	1
(Bulgaria) A Naydenova (Brazil) T Pereira	6^{2}	2
2	(United States) L Raymond (China) S Zhang	7^{7}	6

Semifinals
(Romania) M Niculescu (Czech Republic) K Zakopalová	6	6
4	(Chinese Taipei) Y-j Chan (Slovakia) J Husárová	4	2
(Spain) L Arruabarrena (Spain) S Soler Espinosa	7	4	[3]
2	(United States) L Raymond (China) S Zhang	5	6	[10]

Finals
(Romania) M Niculescu (Czech Republic) K Zakopalová	6	6^{5}	[10]
2	(United States) L Raymond (China) S Zhang	2	7^{7}	[8]
