= 2011 HP Open – Singles =

Singles
- 2011 HP Open

Final
- Champion: (France) Marion Bartoli
- Runner-up: (Australia) Samantha Stosur
- Score: 6–3, 6–1

Events
Singles	Doubles
← 2010 ·	Japan Women's Open	· 2012 →

Tamarine Tanasugarn was the defending champion, but lost to Angelique Kerber in the quarterfinals.

No.2 seed Marion Bartoli won the 2011 title, defeating No.1 seed and US Open Champion Samantha Stosur 6–3, 6–1.

== Seeds ==
1. (Australia) Samantha Stosur (final)
2. (France) Marion Bartoli (champion)
3. (Germany) Angelique Kerber (semifinals)
4. (Czech Republic) Petra Cetkovská (quarterfinals)
5. (Australia) Jarmila Gajdošová (second round)
6. (Japan) Ayumi Morita (quarterfinals)
7. (South Africa) Chanelle Scheepers (quarterfinals)
8. (United States) Christina McHale (first round)

== Main draw ==
=== Key ===
- Q = Qualifier
- WC = Wild card
- LL = Lucky loser
- Alt = Alternate
- SE = Special exempt
- PR = Protected ranking
- ITF = ITF entry
- JE = Junior exempt
- w/o = Walkover
- r = Retired
- d = Defaulted
- SR = Special ranking

=== Finals ===
Semifinals
1	(Australia) Samantha Stosur	7^{7}	3	6
(China) Zheng Jie	6^{5}	6	3
3	(Germany) Angelique Kerber	1	6^{5}
2/WC	(France) Marion Bartoli	6	7^{7}

Final
1	(Australia) Samantha Stosur	3	1
2/WC	(France) Marion Bartoli	6	6

=== Top half ===
First round
1	(Australia) S Stosur	6	3	7
Q	(Thailand) N Lertcheewakarn	3	6	5
(United States) C Vandeweghe	4	4
(Japan) M Doi	6	6
Q	(Japan) S Aoyama	2	0
Q	(Kazakhstan) Y Shvedova	6	6
(Russia) A Kudryavtseva	2	2
7	(South Africa) C Scheepers	6	6
4	(Czech Republic) P Cetkovská	6	7^{7}
(Japan) K Date-Krumm	2	6^{2}
(Luxembourg) M Minella	3	3
Q	(Japan) E Sema	6	6
(Slovakia) Z Kučová	1	1
(China) J Zheng	6	6
WC	(Japan) A Nakamura	0	1
5	(Australia) J Gajdošová	6	6

Second round
1	(Australia) S Stosur	6	6
(Japan) M Doi	2	4
Q	(Kazakhstan) Y Shvedova	6	3	6^{5}
7	(South Africa) C Scheepers	4	6	7^{7}
4	(Czech Republic) P Cetkovská	6	6
Q	(Japan) E Sema	0	3
(China) J Zheng	7	6
5	(Australia) J Gajdošová	5	3

Quarterfinals
1	(Australia) S Stosur	6	6
7	(South Africa) C Scheepers	2	3
4	(Czech Republic) P Cetkovská	6	5	3
(China) J Zheng	0	7	6

Semifinals
1	(Australia) S Stosur	7^{7}	3	6
(China) J Zheng	6^{5}	6	3

=== Bottom half ===
First round
8	(United States) C McHale	3	5
(Thailand) T Tanasugarn	6	7
(France) M Johansson	6	6
(United States) I Falconi	3	2
(Chinese Taipei) Y-J Chan	1	6	4
(Belarus) O Govortsova	6	2	6
WC	(Japan) K Nara	2	1
3	(Germany) A Kerber	6	6
6	(Japan) A Morita	7^{7}	6
(China) S Zhang	6^{3}	2
(Greece) E Daniilidou	6	6
(Russia) A Pivovarova	2	2
(United States) J Craybas	1	6	1
(United States) V King	6	3	6
(Hungary) M Czink	2	2
2/WC	(France) M Bartoli	6	6

Second round
(Thailand) T Tanasugarn	6	6
(France) M Johansson	2	4
(Belarus) O Govortsova	1	3
3	(Germany) A Kerber	6	6
6	(Japan) A Morita	6	6
(Greece) E Daniilidou	2	3
(United States) V King	1	2
2/WC	(France) M Bartoli	6	6

Quarterfinals
(Thailand) T Tanasugarn	3	4
3	(Germany) A Kerber	6	6
6	(Japan) A Morita	2	1
2/WC	(France) M Bartoli	6	6

Semifinals
3	(Germany) A Kerber	1	6^{5}
2/WC	(France) M Bartoli	6	7^{7}
