= 2016 Hobart International – Doubles =

Doubles
- 2016 Hobart International

Final
- Champions: (China) Han Xinyun (United States) Christina McHale
- Runners-up: (Australia) Kimberly Birrell (Australia) Jarmila Wolfe
- Score: 6–3, 6–0

Events
Singles	Doubles
← 2015 ·	Hobart International	· 2017 →

Kiki Bertens and Johanna Larsson were the defending champions, but withdrew from their semifinal match.
Han Xinyun and Christina McHale won the title, defeating Kimberly Birrell and Jarmila Wolfe in the final, 6–3, 6–0.

== Seeds ==
1. (Spain) Anabel Medina Garrigues / (Spain) Arantxa Parra Santonja (semifinals)
2. (Netherlands) Kiki Bertens / (Sweden) Johanna Larsson (semifinals, withdrew)
3. (Ukraine) Lyudmyla Kichenok / (Ukraine) Nadiia Kichenok (quarterfinals)
4. (Croatia) Darija Jurak / (United States) Nicole Melichar (quarterfinals)

== Draw ==
Key

- Q = Qualifier
- WC = Wild card
- LL = Lucky loser
- Alt = Alternate
- ITF = ITF entry
- PR = Protected ranking
- SR = Special ranking
- SE = Special exempt
- JE = Junior exempt
- JR = Junior Accelerator Programme entrant
- CO = College Accelerator Programme entrant
- NG = Next Gen Accelerator Program entrant
- w/o = Walkover
- r = Retired
- d = Defaulted

First round
1	(Spain) A Medina Garrigues (Spain) A Parra Santonja	2	7^{7}	[10]
(Germany) A Beck (Germany) C Witthöft	6	6^{1}	[4]
(Japan) K Nara (Japan) K Takahata	4	2
(Japan) S Aoyama (Japan) M Ninomiya	6	6
3	(Ukraine) L Kichenok (Ukraine) N Kichenok	6	6
(Czech Republic) K Koukalová (Netherlands) D Schuurs	3	3
(Australia) K Birrell (Australia) J Wolfe	6	6
(Ukraine) K Bondarenko (Germany) T Maria	4	4
(United Kingdom) J Rae (United Kingdom) A Smith	3	0
(China) X Han (United States) C McHale	6	6
WC	(Australia) M Inglis (Australia) J Moore	6^{3}	3
4	(Croatia) D Jurak (United States) N Melichar	7^{7}	6
(Japan) M Doi (Japan) N Hibino	6	6
(United Kingdom) J Konta (United Kingdom) H Watson	4	3
(Chinese Taipei) C-j Chuang (Romania) A Dulgheru	1	3
2	(Netherlands) K Bertens (Sweden) J Larsson	6	6

Quarterfinals
1	(Spain) A Medina Garrigues (Spain) A Parra Santonja	3	7^{7}	[10]
(Japan) S Aoyama (Japan) M Ninomiya	6	6^{3}	[4]
3	(Ukraine) L Kichenok (Ukraine) N Kichenok	3	3
(Australia) K Birrell (Australia) J Wolfe	6	6
(China) X Han (United States) C McHale	6	6
4	(Croatia) D Jurak (United States) N Melichar	3	4
(Japan) M Doi (Japan) N Hibino	5	2
2	(Netherlands) K Bertens (Sweden) J Larsson	7	6

Semifinals
1	(Spain) A Medina Garrigues (Spain) A Parra Santonja	4	5
(Australia) K Birrell (Australia) J Wolfe	6	7
(China) X Han (United States) C McHale	w/o
2	(Netherlands) K Bertens (Sweden) J Larsson

Final
(Australia) K Birrell (Australia) J Wolfe	3	0
(China) X Han (United States) C McHale	6	6
