= 2016 Monterrey Open =

- Date: 29 February – 6 March
- Edition: 8th
- Category: WTA International
- Draw: 32S / 16D
- Prize money: $250,000
- Surface: Hard / outdoor
- Location: Monterrey, Mexico

Champions

Singles
- (United Kingdom) Heather Watson

Doubles
- (Spain) Anabel Medina Garrigues / (Spain) Arantxa Parra Santonja
- Monterrey Open

The 2016 Monterrey Open was a women's tennis tournament played on outdoor hard courts. It was the eighth edition of the Monterrey Open and a WTA International tier tournament on the 2016 WTA Tour. It took place at the Club Sonoma in Monterrey, Mexico, from 29 February through 6 March 2016. Unseeded Heather Watson won the singles title.

== Finals ==
=== Singles ===
(United Kingdom) Heather Watson defeated (Belgium) Kirsten Flipkens 3–6, 6–2, 6–3

- It was Watson's only singles title of the year and the 3rd of her career.

=== Doubles ===
(Spain) Anabel Medina Garrigues / (Spain) Arantxa Parra Santonja defeated (Croatia) Petra Martić / (United States) Maria Sanchez 4–6, 7–5, [10–7]

== Points and prize money ==
=== Point distribution ===
Event	W	F	SF	QF	Round of 16	Round of 32	Q	Q3	Q2	Q1
Singles	280	180	110	60	30	1	18	14	10	1
Doubles	280	180	110	60	1	—N/a	—N/a	—N/a	—N/a	—N/a

=== Prize money ===
Event	W	F	SF	QF	Round of 16	Round of 32	Q3	Q2	Q1
Singles	$43,000	$21,400	$11,300	$5,900	$3,310	$1,925	$1,005	$730	$530
Doubles*	$12,300	$6,400	$3,435	$1,820	$960	—N/a	—N/a	—N/a	—N/a

_{*per team}

== Singles main draw entrants ==
=== Seeds ===
Country	Player	Ranking^{1}	Seed
ITA	Sara Errani	17	1
DEN	Caroline Wozniacki	22	2
RUS	Anastasia Pavlyuchenkova	25	3
GBR	Johanna Konta	26	4
FRA	Caroline Garcia	33	5
BEL	Alison Van Uytvanck	44	6
MNE	Danka Kovinić	46	7
HUN	Tímea Babos	48	8

- ^{1} Rankings as of February 22, 2016.

=== Other entrants ===
The following players received wildcards into the main draw:

- (Mexico) Victoria Rodríguez
- (Italy) Francesca Schiavone
- (Mexico) Marcela Zacarías

The following players received entry from the qualifying draw:

- (Croatia) Petra Martić
- (United States) Nicole Gibbs
- (Israel) Julia Glushko
- (France) Pauline Parmentier

=== Withdrawals ===
Before the tournament

- (Belarus) Victoria Azarenka → replaced by (Slovakia) Magdaléna Rybáriková
- (United States) Madison Keys → replaced by (United States) Irina Falconi
- (Italy) Karin Knapp → replaced by (Germany) Tatjana Maria
- (United Kingdom) Laura Robson → replaced by (United Kingdom) Heather Watson
- (United States) Coco Vandeweghe → replaced by (Colombia) Mariana Duque Mariño

=== Retirements ===
- (United States) Christina Mchale (dizziness)

== Doubles main draw entrants ==
=== Seeds ===
Country	Player	Country	Player	Rank^{1}	Seed
ESP	Anabel Medina Garrigues	ESP	Arantxa Parra Santonja	70	1
AUS	Anastasia Rodionova	POL	Alicja Rosolska	85	2
NED	Kiki Bertens	SWE	Johanna Larsson	107	3
ARG	María Irigoyen	POL	Paula Kania	131	4

- Rankings as of February 22, 2016.

=== Other entrants ===
The following pairs received wildcards into the doubles main draw:

- (Venezuela) Andrea Gámiz / (Mexico) Ana Sofía Sánchez
- (Mexico) Victoria Rodríguez / (Mexico) Renata Zarazúa
