= 2015 Hobart International =

Coordinates: 42°52′24″S 147°19′47″E

- Date: 11–17 January 2015
- Edition: 22nd
- Category: WTA International
- Draw: 32S / 16D
- Prize money: $250,000
- Surface: Hard
- Location: Hobart, Australia
- Venue: Hobart International Tennis Centre

Champions

Singles
- (United Kingdom) Heather Watson

Doubles
- (Netherlands) Kiki Bertens / (Sweden) Johanna Larsson
← 2014 ·	Hobart International	· 2016 →

The 2015 Hobart International was a women's tennis tournament played on outdoor hard courts. It was the 22nd edition of the event and part of the WTA International tournaments of the 2015 WTA Tour. It took place at the Hobart International Tennis Centre in Hobart, Australia from 11 through 17 January 2015. Unseeded Heather Watson won the singles title.

== Finals ==
=== Singles ===
(United Kingdom) Heather Watson defeated (United States) Madison Brengle, 6–3, 6–4

- It was Watson's only singles title of the year and the 2nd of her career.

=== Doubles ===
(Netherlands) Kiki Bertens / (Sweden) Johanna Larsson defeated (Russia) Vitalia Diatchenko / (Romania) Monica Niculescu, 7–5, 6–3

== Points and prize money ==
=== Point distribution ===
Event	W	F	SF	QF	Round of 16	Round of 32	Q	Q3	Q2	Q1
Singles	280	180	110	60	30	1	18	14	10	1
Doubles	280	180	110	60	1	—	—	—	—	—

=== Prize money ===
Event	W	F	SF	QF	Round of 16	Round of 32^{1}	Q3	Q2	Q1
Singles	$43,000	$21,400	$11,300	$5,900	$3,310	$1,925	$1,005	$730	$530
Doubles	$12,300	$6,400	$3,435	$1,820	$960	—	—	—	—
Doubles prize money per team

_{^{1} Qualifiers prize money is also the Round of 32 prize money}

== Singles main-draw entrants ==
=== Seeds ===
Country	Player	Rank^{1}	Seed
AUS	Casey Dellacqua	29	1
~~USA~~	~~Varvara Lepchenko~~	~~30~~	~~2~~
KAZ	Zarina Diyas	31	3
USA	Sloane Stephens	34	4
ITA	Camila Giorgi	35	5
GER	Mona Barthel	40	6
USA	Alison Riske	42	7
ITA	Roberta Vinci	44	8
CZE	Klára Koukalová	45	9

- ^{1} Rankings as of 12 January 2015.

=== Other entrants ===
The following players received wildcards into the singles main draw:

- (Slovakia) Daniela Hantuchová
- (Australia) Olivia Rogowska
- (Australia) Storm Sanders

The following player received entry as a special exempt:

- (China) Zheng Saisai

The following players received entry from the qualifying draw:

- (United States) Madison Brengle
- (Netherlands) Richèl Hogenkamp
- (Ukraine) Kateryna Kozlova
- (Sweden) Johanna Larsson

The following player received entry as a lucky loser:

- (Spain) Sílvia Soler Espinosa

=== Withdrawals ===
Before the tournament

- (United States) Varvara Lepchenko (right ankle injury) → replaced by (Spain) Sílvia Soler Espinosa

During the tournament

- (Estonia) Kaia Kanepi (viral illness)

=== Retirements ===
- (United States) Christina McHale (right shoulder injury)
- (Croatia) Mirjana Lučić-Baroni (left leg injury)
- (China) Zheng Saisai (left thigh injury)

== Doubles main-draw entrants ==
=== Seeds ===
Country	Player	Country	Player	Rank^{1}	Seed
ZIM	Cara Black	CHN	Zheng Saisai	90	1
POL	Klaudia Jans-Ignacik	SLO	Andreja Klepač	103	2
CRO	Darija Jurak	USA	Megan Moulton-Levy	111	3
ESP	Lara Arruabarrena	ROU	Raluca Olaru	117	4

- ^{1} Rankings as of 5 January 2015.

=== Withdrawals ===
During the tournament

- (Croatia) Mirjana Lučić-Baroni (left leg injury)
- (United States) Sloane Stephens (abdominal injury)

=== Retirements ===
- (Zimbabwe) Cara Black (viral illness)
