= 2016 Monterrey Open – Doubles =

Doubles
- 2016 Monterrey Open

Final
- Champions: (Spain) Anabel Medina Garrigues (Spain) Arantxa Parra Santonja
- Runners-up: (Croatia) Petra Martić (United States) Maria Sanchez
- Score: 4–6, 7–5, [10–7]

Details
- Draw: 16
- Seeds: 4

Events
Singles	Doubles
← 2015 ·	Monterrey Open	· 2017 →

Gabriela Dabrowski and Alicja Rosolska were the defending champions, but Dabrowski chose not to participate this year. Rosolska played alongside Anastasia Rodionova, but lost in the first round to Petra Martić and Maria Sanchez.
Anabel Medina Garrigues and Arantxa Parra Santonja won the title, defeating Martić and Sanchez in the final, 4–6, 7–5, [10–7].

== Seeds ==
1. (Spain) Anabel Medina Garrigues / (Spain) Arantxa Parra Santonja (champions)
2. (Australia) Anastasia Rodionova / (Poland) Alicja Rosolska (first round)
3. (Netherlands) Kiki Bertens / (Sweden) Johanna Larsson (quarterfinals)
4. (Argentina) María Irigoyen / (Poland) Paula Kania (semifinals)

== Draw ==
=== Key ===
- Q = Qualifier
- WC = Wild card
- LL = Lucky loser
- Alt = Alternate
- SE = Special exempt
- PR = Protected ranking
- ITF = ITF entry
- JE = Junior exempt
- w/o = Walkover
- r = Retired
- d = Defaulted
- SR = Special ranking

First round
1	(Spain) A Medina Garrigues (Spain) A Parra Santonja	6	6
(New Zealand) M Erakovic (Spain) S Soler Espinosa	1	3
(Chinese Taipei) C-j Chuang (Japan) M Doi	6	6
WC	(Venezuela) A Gámiz (Mexico) AS Sánchez	2	1
3	(Netherlands) K Bertens (Sweden) J Larsson	6	6
WC	(Mexico) V Rodríguez (Mexico) R Zarazúa	4	2
(Belgium) A-S Mestach (Netherlands) D Schuurs	6	2	[9]
(Paraguay) V Cepede Royg (Montenegro) D Kovinić	2	6	[11]
(United States) N Gibbs (Germany) T Maria	7^{9}	4	[10]
(China) X Han (United States) C McHale	6^{7}	6	[8]
(United Kingdom) J Rae (United Kingdom) A Smith	2	0
4	(Argentina) M Irigoyen (Poland) P Kania	6	6
(Japan) S Aoyama (Japan) M Ninomiya	6	1	[6]
(Romania) E Bogdan (Switzerland) V Golubic	4	6	[10]
(Croatia) P Martić (United States) M Sanchez	7^{7}	6
2	(Australia) An Rodionova (Poland) A Rosolska	6^{3}	3

Quarterfinals
1	(Spain) A Medina Garrigues (Spain) A Parra Santonja	7^{7}	6
(Chinese Taipei) C-j Chuang (Japan) M Doi	6^{5}	4
3	(Netherlands) K Bertens (Sweden) J Larsson	6	4	[7]
(Paraguay) V Cepede Royg (Montenegro) D Kovinić	3	6	[10]
(United States) N Gibbs (Germany) T Maria	2	4
4	(Argentina) M Irigoyen (Poland) P Kania	6	6
(Romania) E Bogdan (Switzerland) V Golubic	4	4
(Croatia) P Martić (United States) M Sanchez	6	6

Semifinals
1	(Spain) A Medina Garrigues (Spain) A Parra Santonja	6	6
(Paraguay) V Cepede Royg (Montenegro) D Kovinić	1	3
4	(Argentina) M Irigoyen (Poland) P Kania	4	2
(Croatia) P Martić (United States) M Sanchez	6	6

Final
1	(Spain) A Medina Garrigues (Spain) A Parra Santonja	4	7	[10]
(Croatia) P Martić (United States) M Sanchez	6	5	[7]
