= 2012 HP Open =

Women's tennis tournament

- Date: 8–14 October
- Edition: 4th
- Category: WTA International
- Draw: 32S / 16D
- Prize money: $220,000
- Surface: Hard / outdoor
- Location: Osaka, Japan
- Venue: Utsubo Tennis Center

Champions

Singles
- (United Kingdom) Heather Watson

Doubles
- (United States) Raquel Kops-Jones / (United States) Abigail Spears
← 2011 ·	Japan Women's Open	· 2013 →

The 2012 HP Open was a women's tennis tournament played on outdoor hard courts sponsored by Hewlett-Packard. It was the fourth edition of the HP Open, and part of the WTA International tournaments of the 2012 WTA Tour. It was held at the Utsubo Tennis Center in Osaka, Japan, from October 8 through October 14, 2012. Unseeded Heather Watson won the singles title.

== Finals ==
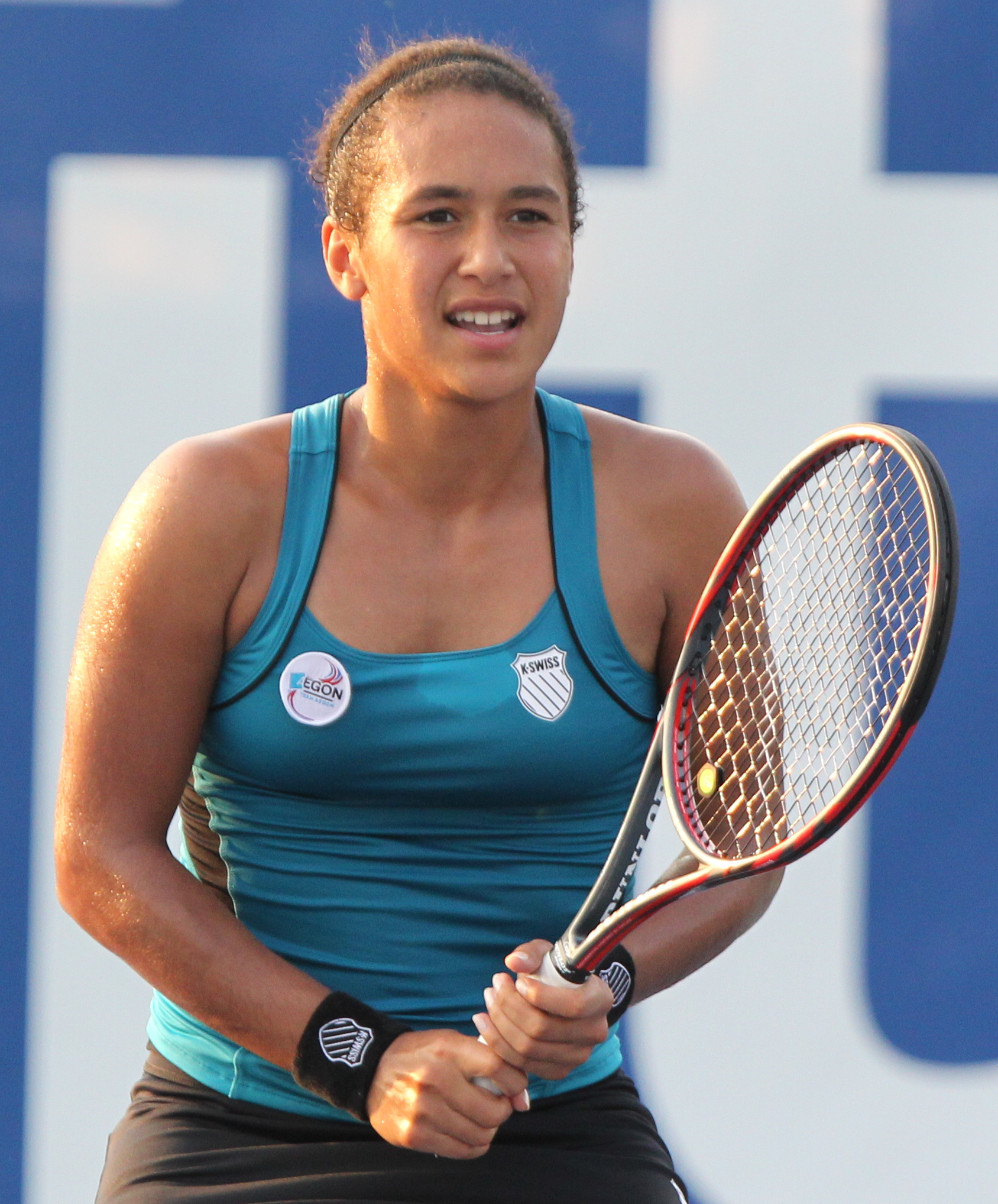
Heather Watson

=== Singles ===
- (United Kingdom) Heather Watson defeated (Chinese Taipei) Chang Kai-chen 7–5, 5–7, 7–6^{(7–4)}

=== Doubles ===
- (United States) Raquel Kops-Jones / (United States) Abigail Spears defeated (Japan) Kimiko Date-Krumm / (United Kingdom) Heather Watson 6–1, 6–4

== Singles main-draw entrants ==
=== Seeds ===
Country	Player	Rank^{1}	Seed
AUS	Samantha Stosur	9	1
CHN	Zheng Jie	22	2
USA	Christina McHale	30	3
ITA	Francesca Schiavone	33	4
KAZ	Yaroslava Shvedova	36	5
ESP	Anabel Medina Garrigues	39	6
RSA	Chanelle Scheepers	53	7
GBR	Laura Robson	60	8

- Rankings are as of October 1, 2012

=== Other entrants ===
The following players received wildcards into the singles main draw:

- (Japan) Kurumi Nara
- (Italy) Francesca Schiavone
- (Thailand) Tamarine Tanasugarn

The following players received entry from the qualifying draw:

- (Thailand) Nudnida Luangnam
- (Russia) Olga Puchkova
- (Thailand) Luksika Kumkhum
- (China) Zhou Yimiao

=== Withdrawals ===
- (Hungary) Tímea Babos
- (Czech Republic) Petra Cetkovská
- (Hungary) Melinda Czink
- (New Zealand) Marina Erakovic
- (Belarus) Olga Govortsova
- (Netherlands) Michaëlla Krajicek
- (Luxembourg) Mandy Minella
- (Israel) Shahar Pe'er
- (United States) Sloane Stephens
- (United States) CoCo Vandeweghe
- (Kazakhstan) Galina Voskoboeva
- (Canada) Aleksandra Wozniak

=== Retirements ===
- (Italy) Francesca Schiavone (right wrist injury)

== Doubles main-draw entrants ==
=== Seeds ===
Country	Player	Country	Player	Rank^{1}	Seed
USA	Raquel Kops-Jones	USA	Abigail Spears	33	1
ESP	Anabel Medina Garrigues	CHN	Zheng Jie	49	2
CRO	Darija Jurak	HUN	Katalin Marosi	98	3
JPN	Kimiko Date-Krumm	GBR	Heather Watson	149	4

- ^{1} Rankings are as of October 1, 2012

=== Other entrants ===
The following pair received wildcard into the doubles main draw:

- (Japan) Kurumi Nara / (Japan) Erika Sema

=== Retirements ===
- (Greece) Eleni Daniilidou (right hamstring strain)
