= 2011 HP Open =

Women's tennis tournament

- Date: 10–16 October
- Edition: 3rd
- Category: WTA International
- Draw: 32S / 16D
- Prize money: $220,000
- Surface: Hard / outdoor
- Location: Osaka, Japan
- Venue: Utsubo Tennis Center

Champions

Singles
- (France) Marion Bartoli

Doubles
- (Japan) Kimiko Date-Krumm / (China) Zhang Shuai
← 2010 ·	Japan Women's Open	· 2012 →

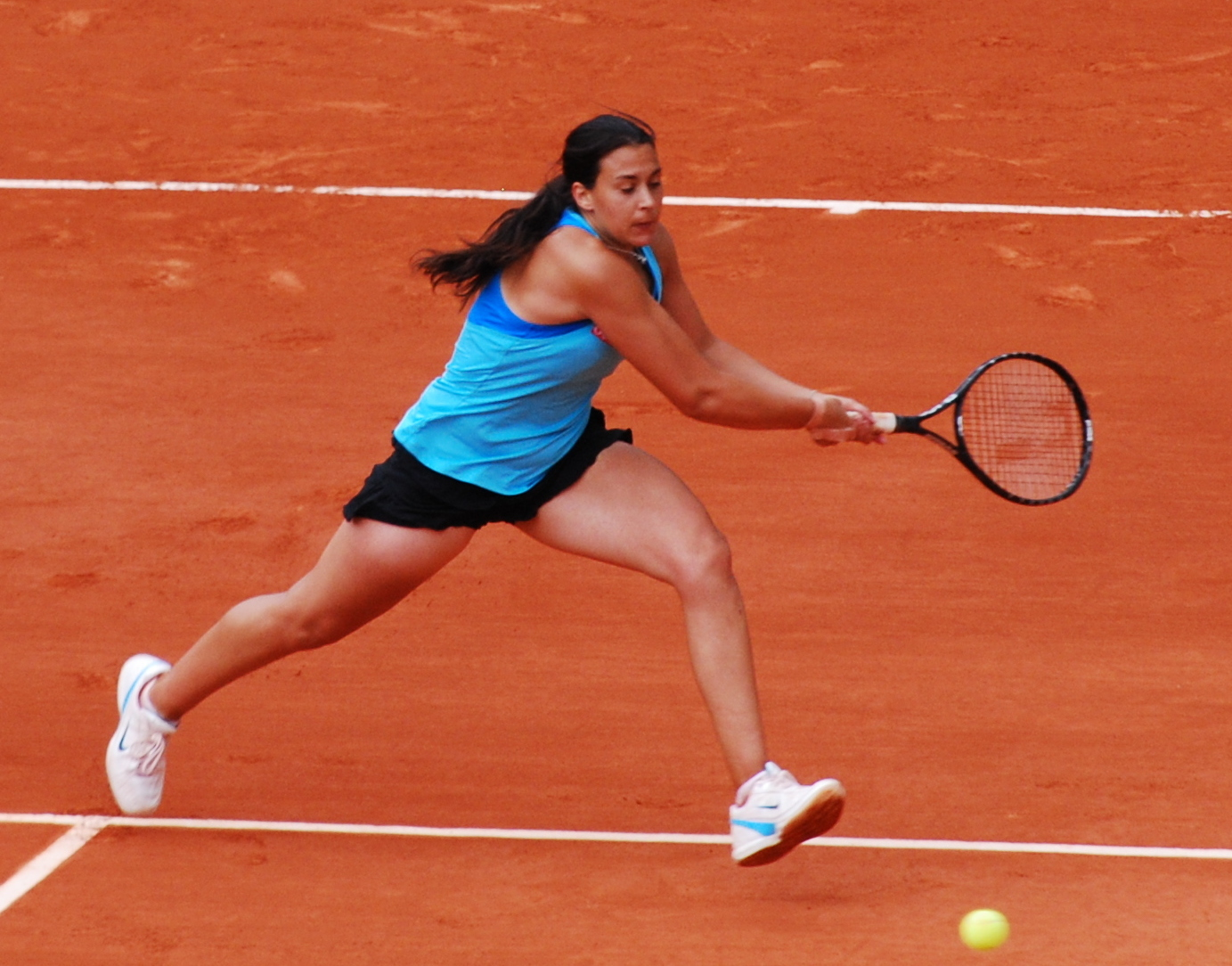
Marion Bartoli at the 2011 HP Open

The 2011 HP Open was a tennis tournament played on outdoor hard courts. It was the third edition of the HP Open, and part of the WTA International tournaments of the 2011 WTA Tour. It was held at the Utsubo Tennis Center in Osaka, Japan, from October 10 through October 16, 2011. Second-seeded Marion Bartoli won the singles title.

== Finals ==
=== Singles ===
(France) Marion Bartoli defeated (Australia) Samantha Stosur, 6–3, 6–1

- It was Bartoli' 2nd title of the year and the 7th of her career.

=== Doubles ===
(Japan) Kimiko Date-Krumm / (China) Zhang Shuai defeated (United States) Vania King / (Kazakhstan) Yaroslava Shvedova, 7–5, 3–6, [11–9]

== WTA players ==
=== Seeds ===
Country	Player	Rank^{1}	Seed
AUS	Samantha Stosur	7	1
FRA	Marion Bartoli	10	2
GER	Angelique Kerber	30	3
CZE	Petra Cetkovská	32	4
AUS	Jarmila Gajdošová	34	5
JPN	Ayumi Morita	40	6
RSA	Chanelle Scheepers	41	7
USA	Christina McHale	49	8

- Seeds are based on the rankings of October 3, 2011.

=== Other entrants ===
The following players received wildcards into the singles main draw:

- (France) Marion Bartoli
- (Japan) Aiko Nakamura
- (Japan) Kurumi Nara

The following players received entry from the qualifying draw:

- (Japan) Shuko Aoyama
- (Thailand) Noppawan Lertcheewakarn
- (Japan) Erika Sema
- (Kazakhstan) Yaroslava Shvedova
