= 2016 Hobart International =

Coordinates: 42°52′24″S 147°19′47″E

- Date: 10–16 January 2016
- Edition: 23rd
- Category: WTA International tournaments
- Draw: 32S / 16D
- Prize money: $250,000
- Surface: Hard
- Location: Hobart, Australia
- Venue: Hobart International Tennis Centre

Champions

Singles
- (France) Alizé Cornet

Doubles
- (China) Han Xinyun / (United States) Christina McHale
← 2015 ·	Hobart International	· 2017 →

The 2016 Hobart International was a women's tennis tournament played on outdoor hard courts. It was the 23rd edition of the event and part of the WTA International tournaments of the 2016 WTA Tour. It took place at the Hobart International Tennis Centre in Hobart, Australia from 10 through 16 January 2016.

== Finals ==
=== Singles ===
- (France) Alizé Cornet defeated (Canada) Eugenie Bouchard, 6–1, 6–2

=== Doubles ===
- (China) Han Xinyun / (United States) Christina McHale defeated (Australia) Kimberly Birrell / (Australia) Jarmila Wolfe, 6–3, 6–0

== Points and prize money ==
=== Point distribution ===
Event	W	F	SF	QF	Round of 16	Round of 32	Q	Q3	Q2	Q1
Singles	280	180	110	60	30	1	18	14	10	1
Doubles	280	180	110	60	1	—	—	—	—	—

=== Prize money ===
Event	W	F	SF	QF	Round of 16	Round of 32^{2}	Q3	Q2	Q1
Singles	$43,000	$21,400	$11,300	$5,900	$3,310	$1,925	$1,005	$730	$530
Doubles	$12,300	$6,400	$3,435	$1,820	$960	—	—	—	—
Doubles prize money per team

^{2} Qualifiers prize money is also the Round of 32 prize money.

== Singles main-draw entrants ==
=== Seeds ===
Country	Player	Rank^{1}	Seed
~~USA~~	~~Sloane Stephens~~	~~30~~	~~1~~
ITA	Camila Giorgi	35	2
SVK	Dominika Cibulková	38	3
ROU	Monica Niculescu	39	4
USA	Madison Brengle	40	5
CZE	Barbora Strýcová	42	6
FRA	Alizé Cornet	43	7
BEL	Alison Van Uytvanck	44	8
GER	Mona Barthel	45	9

- ^{1} Rankings as of 4 January 2016.

=== Other entrants ===
The following players received wildcards into the singles main draw:

- (Australia) Kimberly Birrell
- (Australia) Maddison Inglis
- (Australia) Jarmila Wolfe

The following players received entry from the qualifying draw:

- (Netherlands) Kiki Bertens
- (Japan) Kurumi Nara
- (Japan) Naomi Osaka
- (Spain) Laura Pous Tió

The following players received entry as lucky losers:

- (Paraguay) Verónica Cepede Royg
- (France) Pauline Parmentier

=== Withdrawals ===
Before the tournament

- (Czech Republic) Petra Cetkovská → replaced by (Germany) Carina Witthöft
- (United States) Alison Riske (change of schedule) → replaced by (France) Pauline Parmentier
- (United States) Sloane Stephens (viral illness) → replaced by (Paraguay) Verónica Cepede Royg

During the tournament

- (Germany) Mona Barthel (back injury)

=== Retirements ===
- (United States) Madison Brengle (respiratory illness)

== Doubles main-draw entrants ==
=== Seeds ===
Country	Player	Country	Player	Rank^{1}	Seed
ESP	Anabel Medina Garrigues	ESP	Arantxa Parra Santonja	69	1
NED	Kiki Bertens	SWE	Johanna Larsson	74	2
UKR	Lyudmyla Kichenok	UKR	Nadiia Kichenok	113	3
CRO	Darija Jurak	USA	Nicole Melichar	125	4

- ^{1} Rankings as of 4 January 2016.

=== Other entrants ===
The following pair received a wildcard into the doubles main draw:

- (Australia) Maddison Inglis / (Australia) Jessica Moore

=== Withdrawals ===
During the tournament

- (Sweden) Johanna Larsson (thigh injury)
