= 2015 Monterrey Open =

- Date: 2–8 March
- Edition: 7th
- Category: WTA International
- Draw: 32S / 16D
- Prize money: $500,000
- Surface: Hard
- Location: Monterrey, Mexico

Champions

Singles
- (Switzerland) Timea Bacsinszky

Doubles
- (Canada) Gabriela Dabrowski / (Poland) Alicja Rosolska
- Monterrey Open

The 2015 Monterrey Open was a women's tennis tournament played on outdoor hard courts. It was the seventh edition of the Monterrey Open and a WTA International tier tournament on the 2015 WTA Tour. It took place at the Club Sonoma in Monterrey, Mexico, from 2 March through 8 March 2015. Fourth-seeded Timea Bacsinszky won the singles title.

== Finals ==
=== Singles ===
- (Switzerland) Timea Bacsinszky defeated (France) Caroline Garcia 4–6, 6–2, 6–4

=== Doubles ===
- (Canada) Gabriela Dabrowski / (Poland) Alicja Rosolska defeated (Australia) Anastasia Rodionova / (Australia) Arina Rodionova 6–3, 2–6, [10–3]

== Points and prize money ==
=== Point distribution ===
Event	W	F	SF	QF	Round of 16	Round of 32	Q	Q3	Q2	Q1
Singles	280	180	110	60	30	1	18	14	10	1
Doubles	280	180	110	60	1	—N/a	—N/a	—N/a	—N/a	—N/a

=== Prize money ===
Event	W	F	SF	QF	Round of 16	Round of 32^{1}	Q3	Q2	Q1
Singles	$111,163	$55,323	$29,730	$8,934	$4,928	$3,199	$1,852	$1,081	$
Doubles*	$17,724	$9,222	$4,951	$2,623	$1,383	—N/a	—N/a	—N/a	—N/a

_{^{1}Qualifiers prize money is also the Round of 32 prize money.}
_{*per team}

== Singles main-draw entrants ==
=== Seeds ===
Country	Player	Rank*	Seed
SRB	Ana Ivanovic	6	1
ITA	Sara Errani	12	2
FRA	Caroline Garcia	30	3
SUI	Timea Bacsinszky	37	4
RUS	Anastasia Pavlyuchenkova	40	5
USA	Alison Riske	43	6
SVK	Daniela Hantuchová	45	7
SVK	Magdaléna Rybáriková	50	8

- Rankings as of February 23, 2015

=== Other entrants ===
The following players received wildcards into the main draw:

- (Serbia) Jovana Jakšić
- (Mexico) Ana Sofía Sánchez
- (Italy) Francesca Schiavone

The following players received entry from the qualifying draw:

- (Poland) Urszula Radwańska
- (United States) Bethanie Mattek-Sands
- (Czech Republic) Nicole Vaidišová
- (Hungary) Tímea Babos

=== Withdrawals ===
Before the tournament

- (Canada) Eugenie Bouchard →replaced by Aleksandra Krunić
- (Romania) Irina-Camelia Begu (rib injury) →replaced by Sílvia Soler Espinosa
- (Slovakia) Jana Čepelová →replaced by Ajla Tomljanović
- (Serbia) Jelena Janković →replaced by Shelby Rogers
- (Croatia) Mirjana Lučić-Baroni →replaced by Yanina Wickmayer
- (United States) Christina McHale →replaced by Johanna Larsson
- (Romania) Monica Niculescu →replaced by Kiki Bertens
- (United States) Sloane Stephens →replaced by Lesia Tsurenko
- (United States) CoCo Vandeweghe (shoulder injury) →replaced by Tereza Smitková
- (Italy) Roberta Vinci →replaced by Kristina Mladenovic
- (China) Shuai Zhang →replaced by Anna Schmiedlová

=== Retirements ===
- (Slovakia) Magdaléna Rybáriková

== Doubles main-draw entrants ==
=== Seeds ===
Country	Player	Country	Player	Rank^{1}	Seed
HUN	Tímea Babos	FRA	Kristina Mladenovic	28	1
CZE	Andrea Hlaváčková	CZE	Lucie Hradecká	47	2
AUS	Anastasia Rodionova	AUS	Arina Rodionova	75	3
CAN	Gabriela Dabrowski	POL	Alicja Rosolska	114	4

- Rankings as of February 23, 2015

=== Other entrants ===
The following pairs received wildcards into the doubles main draw:

- (United States) Bethanie Mattek-Sands / (Puerto Rico) Monica Puig
- (Mexico) Victoria Rodríguez / (Mexico) Marcela Zacarías

=== Retirements ===
- (Hungary) Tímea Babos (lower back injury)
