= 2015 Monterrey Open – Doubles =

Doubles
- 2015 Monterrey Open

Final
- Champions: (Canada) Gabriela Dabrowski (Poland) Alicja Rosolska
- Runners-up: (Australia) Anastasia Rodionova (Australia) Arina Rodionova
- Score: 6-3, 2-6, [10-3]

Details
- Draw: 16
- Seeds: 4

Events
Singles	Doubles
← 2014 ·	Monterrey Open	· 2016 →

Darija Jurak and Megan Moulton-Levy were the defending champions, but chose not to participate this year.

== Seeds ==
1. (Hungary) Tímea Babos / (France) Kristina Mladenovic (first round, retired)
2. (Czech Republic) Andrea Hlaváčková / (Czech Republic) Lucie Hradecká (semifinals)
3. (Australia) Anastasia Rodionova / (Australia) Arina Rodionova (final)
4. (Canada) Gabriela Dabrowski / (Poland) Alicja Rosolska (champions)

== Draw ==
=== Key ===
- Q = Qualifier
- WC = Wild card
- LL = Lucky loser
- Alt = Alternate
- SE = Special exempt
- PR = Protected ranking
- ITF = ITF entry
- JE = Junior exempt
- w/o = Walkover
- r = Retired
- d = Defaulted
- SR = Special ranking

=== Draw ===
First round
1	(Hungary) T Babos (France) K Mladenovic	4^{r}
(Spain) L Arruabarrena (Romania) R Olaru	1
(Netherlands) K Bertens (Sweden) J Larsson	6	6
WC	(United States) B Mattek-Sands (Puerto Rico) M Puig	4	4
4	(Canada) G Dabrowski (Poland) A Rosolska	6	6
(Argentina) M Irigoyen (Serbia) A Krunić	3	0
(Czech Republic) E Hrdinová (Poland) P Kania	6	6^{4}	[10]
(Chinese Taipei) C-w Chan (France) L Thorpe	0	7^{7}	[7]
(Romania) E Bogdan (United States) N Melichar	7^{7}	6
(Chinese Taipei) C-j Chuang (France) P Parmentier	6^{5}	2
(Spain) S Soler Espinosa (Spain) MT Torró Flor	3	3
3	(Australia) An Rodionova (Australia) Ar Rodionova	6	6
WC	(Mexico) V Rodríguez (Mexico) M Zacarías	1	3
(Switzerland) T Bacsinszky (Russia) V Zvonareva	6	6
(United Kingdom) J Rae (United Kingdom) A Smith	2	3
2	(Czech Republic) A Hlaváčková (Czech Republic) L Hradecká	6	6

Quarterfinals
(Spain) L Arruabarrena (Romania) R Olaru	2	5
(Netherlands) K Bertens (Sweden) J Larsson	6	7
4	(Canada) G Dabrowski (Poland) A Rosolska	6	6
(Czech Republic) E Hrdinová (Poland) P Kania	4	2
(Romania) E Bogdan (United States) N Melichar	4	4
3	(Australia) An Rodionova (Australia) Ar Rodionova	6	6
(Switzerland) T Bacsinszky (Russia) V Zvonareva	5	0
2	(Czech Republic) A Hlaváčková (Czech Republic) L Hradecká	7	6

Semifinals
(Netherlands) K Bertens (Sweden) J Larsson	2	5
4	(Canada) G Dabrowski (Poland) A Rosolska	6	7
3	(Australia) An Rodionova (Australia) Ar Rodionova	6	2	[10]
2	(Czech Republic) A Hlaváčková (Czech Republic) L Hradecká	4	6	[7]

Final
4	(Canada) G Dabrowski (Poland) A Rosolska	6	2	[10]
3	(Australia) An Rodionova (Australia) Ar Rodionova	3	6	[3]
