= 2015 Monterrey Open – Singles =

Singles
- 2015 Monterrey Open

Final
- Champion: (Switzerland) Timea Bacsinszky
- Runner-up: (France) Caroline Garcia
- Score: 4–6, 6–2, 6–4

Details
- Draw: 32
- Seeds: 8

Events
Singles	Doubles
- Monterrey Open

Ana Ivanovic was the defending champion, but lost to Caroline Garcia in the semifinals.

Timea Bacsinszky won her second title of the year, defeating Garcia in the final, 4–6, 6–2, 6–4.

== Seeds ==
1. (Serbia) Ana Ivanovic (semifinals)
2. (Italy) Sara Errani (semifinals)
3. (France) Caroline Garcia (final)
4. (Switzerland) Timea Bacsinszky (champion)
5. (Russia) Anastasia Pavlyuchenkova (quarterfinals)
6. (United States) Alison Riske (first round)
7. (Slovakia) Daniela Hantuchová (second round)
8. (Slovakia) Magdaléna Rybáriková (quarterfinals)

== Draw ==
Key

- Q = Qualifier
- WC = Wild card
- LL = Lucky loser
- Alt = Alternate
- ITF = ITF entry
- PR = Protected ranking
- SR = Special ranking
- SE = Special exempt
- JE = Junior exempt
- JR = Junior Accelerator Programme entrant
- CO = College Accelerator Programme entrant
- NG = Next Gen Accelerator Program entrant
- w/o = Walkover
- r = Retired
- d = Defaulted

=== Finals ===
Semifinals
1	(Serbia) Ana Ivanovic	1	4
3	(France) Caroline Garcia	6	6
4	(Switzerland) Timea Bacsinszky	6	4	7^{7}
2	(Italy) Sara Errani	0	6	6^{3}

Final
3	(France) Caroline Garcia	6	2	4
4	(Switzerland) Timea Bacsinszky	4	6	6

=== Top half ===
First round
1	(Serbia) A Ivanovic	6	7^{7}
Q	(Czech Republic) N Vaidišová	1	6^{4}
(Serbia) A Krunić	6	4	1
(France) P Parmentier	3	6	6
(France) K Mladenovic	6	6
(Czech Republic) T Smitková	4	4
PR	(Russia) V Zvonareva	6	6
6	(United States) A Riske	4	0
3	(France) C Garcia	7	7^{7}
(Italy) K Knapp	5	6^{5}
Q	(United States) B Mattek-Sands	6	6^{3}	4
WC	(Italy) F Schiavone	3	7^{7}	6
WC	(Mexico) AS Sánchez	2	3
(Slovenia) P Hercog	6	6
WC	(Serbia) J Jakšić	3	6	5
8	(Slovakia) M Rybáriková	6	3	7

Second round
1	(Serbia) A Ivanovic	6	6
(France) P Parmentier	3	2
(France) K Mladenovic	6	6
PR	(Russia) V Zvonareva	4	2
3	(France) C Garcia	7^{7}	6
WC	(Italy) F Schiavone	6^{2}	0
(Slovenia) P Hercog	5	6	6^{9}
8	(Slovakia) M Rybáriková	7	3	7^{11}

Quarterfinals
1	(Serbia) A Ivanovic	6	6
(France) K Mladenovic	3	2
3	(France) C Garcia	7	0
8	(Slovakia) M Rybáriková	5	0^{r}

Semifinals
1	(Serbia) A Ivanovic	1	4
3	(France) C Garcia	6	6

=== Bottom half ===
First round
7	(Slovakia) D Hantuchová	7^{7}	3	7
(Puerto Rico) M Puig	6^{1}	6	5
(Spain) MT Torró Flor	6^{0}	6^{3}
Q	(Poland) U Radwańska	7^{7}	7^{7}
(Ukraine) L Tsurenko	6	6
(United States) S Rogers	2	0
(Belgium) Y Wickmayer	6^{8}	6	4
4	(Switzerland) T Bacsinszky	7^{10}	3	6
5	(Russia) A Pavlyuchenkova	4	6	6
(Slovakia) A Schmiedlová	6	3	0
(Sweden) J Larsson	6	6
(Netherlands) K Bertens	3	2
Q	(Hungary) T Babos	6	6
(Spain) S Soler Espinosa	4	3
(United States) L Davis	0	3
2	(Italy) S Errani	6	6

Second round
7	(Slovakia) D Hantuchová	2	4
Q	(Poland) U Radwańska	6	6
(Ukraine) L Tsurenko	6	4	4
4	(Switzerland) T Bacsinszky	4	6	6
5	(Russia) A Pavlyuchenkova	6	6
(Sweden) J Larsson	4	4
Q	(Hungary) T Babos	3	3
2	(Italy) S Errani	6	6

Quarterfinals
Q	(Poland) U Radwańska	4	2
4	(Switzerland) T Bacsinszky	6	6
5	(Russia) A Pavlyuchenkova	5	4
2	(Italy) S Errani	7	6

Semifinals
4	(Switzerland) T Bacsinszky	6	4	7^{7}
2	(Italy) S Errani	0	6	6^{3}

== Qualifying ==
=== Seeds ===
1. (United States) Varvara Lepchenko (first round)
2. (Spain) Lara Arruabarrena (first round)
3. (Ukraine) Lesia Tsurenko (moved to main draw)
4. (Hungary) Tímea Babos (qualified)
5. (United States) Taylor Townsend (first round)
6. (United States) Grace Min (first round)
7. (United States) Irina Falconi (qualifying competition)
8. (Belgium) Alison Van Uytvanck (second round)
9. (Japan) Kimiko Date-Krumm (withdrew)

=== Qualifiers ===
1. (Poland) Urszula Radwańska
2. (United States) Bethanie Mattek-Sands
3. (Czech Republic) Nicole Vaidišová
4. (Hungary) Tímea Babos

=== Draw ===
==== First qualifier ====
First round
1	(United States) Varvara Lepchenko	0	1
(Portugal) Michelle Larcher de Brito	6	6
(Netherlands) Richèl Hogenkamp	6	6
PR	(United States) Alexa Glatch	1	3
(Poland) Urszula Radwańska	6	6
WC	(Mexico) Carolina Betancourt	1	0
(Czech Republic) Andrea Hlaváčková	6	6
6	(United States) Grace Min	3	3

Second round
(Portugal) Michelle Larcher de Brito	2	6	1
(Netherlands) Richèl Hogenkamp	6	1	6
(Poland) Urszula Radwańska	7^{7}	6
(Czech Republic) Andrea Hlaváčková	6^{2}	2

Qualifying competition
(Netherlands) Richèl Hogenkamp	1	2
(Poland) Urszula Radwańska	6	6

==== Second qualifier ====
First round
2	(Spain) Lara Arruabarrena	2	4
(Argentina) Paula Ormaechea	6	6
(Mexico) Marcela Zacarías	7	1	3
(United States) Bethanie Mattek-Sands	5	6	6
(United States) Louisa Chirico	4	1
(Poland) Paula Kania	6	6
WC	(Mexico) Victoria Rodríguez	1	3
7	(United States) Irina Falconi	6	6

Second round
(Argentina) Paula Ormaechea	1	6	4
(United States) Bethanie Mattek-Sands	6	4	6
(Poland) Paula Kania	5	5
7	(United States) Irina Falconi	7	7

Qualifying competition
(United States) Bethanie Mattek-Sands	6	2	6
7	(United States) Irina Falconi	4	6	2

==== Third qualifier ====
First round
Alt	(Japan) Makoto Ninomiya	6	2	1
WC	(Czech Republic) Nicole Vaidišová	0	6	6
(Czech Republic) Lucie Hradecká	4	7	6
(Japan) Eri Hozumi	6	5	3
WC	(Mexico) Ximena Hermoso	6^{1}	3
(Australia) Arina Rodionova	7^{7}	6
(Argentina) María Irigoyen	7^{7}	6
5	(United States) Taylor Townsend	6^{5}	4

Second round
WC	(Czech Republic) Nicole Vaidišová	2	6	6
(Czech Republic) Lucie Hradecká	6	2	3
(Australia) Arina Rodionova	6	6
(Argentina) María Irigoyen	0	4

Qualifying competition
WC	(Czech Republic) Nicole Vaidišová	6	6
(Australia) Arina Rodionova	3	2

==== Fourth qualifier ====
First round
4	(Hungary) Tímea Babos	6	6
(United States) Sachia Vickery	3	1
(Colombia) Mariana Duque Mariño	6	4	6
(Canada) Gabriela Dabrowski	1	6	1
(Bulgaria) Sesil Karatantcheva	2	2
(Ukraine) Kateryna Bondarenko	6	6
(Australia) Anastasia Rodionova	6	2	0
8	(Belgium) Alison Van Uytvanck	1	6	6

Second round
4	(Hungary) Tímea Babos	6	6
(Colombia) Mariana Duque Mariño	3	2
(Ukraine) Kateryna Bondarenko	6	7
8	(Belgium) Alison Van Uytvanck	2	5

Qualifying competition
4	(Hungary) Tímea Babos	7	2	6
(Ukraine) Kateryna Bondarenko	5	6	4
