= 2014 Hobart International – Singles =

Singles
- 2014 Hobart International

Final
- Champion: (Spain) Garbiñe Muguruza
- Runner-up: (Czech Republic) Klára Zakopalová
- Score: 6–4, 6–0

Details
- Draw: 32
- Seeds: 8

Events
Singles	Doubles
← 2013 ·	Hobart International	· 2015 →

Elena Vesnina was the defending champion, but she retired in the second round against Estrella Cabeza Candela.

Garbiñe Muguruza won her first WTA singles title, defeating Klára Zakopalová in the final, 6–4, 6–0.

== Seeds ==
1. (Australia) Samantha Stosur (semifinals)
2. (Belgium) Kirsten Flipkens (quarterfinals)
3. (Russia) Elena Vesnina (second round, retired because of a left hip injury)
4. (Russia) Anastasia Pavlyuchenkova (first round)

5. (Italy) Flavia Pennetta (withdrew due to a wrist injury)
6. (Germany) Mona Barthel (second round)
7. (Czech Republic) Klára Zakopalová (final)
8. (Serbia) Bojana Jovanovski (quarterfinals)

== Main draw ==
=== Key ===
- Q = Qualifier
- WC = Wild card
- LL = Lucky loser
- Alt = Alternate
- ITF = ITF entry
- PR = Protected ranking
- SR = Special ranking
- SE = Special exempt
- JE = Junior exempt
- JR = Junior Accelerator Programme entrant
- CO = College Accelerator Programme entrant
- NG = Next Gen Accelerator Program entrant
- w/o = Walkover
- r = Retired
- d = Defaulted

=== Finals ===
Semifinals
1	(Australia) Samantha Stosur	3	2
7	(Czech Republic) Klára Zakopalová	6	6
Q	(Spain) Estrella Cabeza Candela	0	1
Q	(Spain) Garbiñe Muguruza	6	6

Final
7	(Czech Republic) Klára Zakopalová	4	0
Q	(Spain) Garbiñe Muguruza	6	6

=== Top half ===
First round
1	(Australia) S Stosur	6^{4}	6	7^{7}
Q	(United States) M Brengle	7^{7}	1	6^{5}
LL	(Spain) S Soler Espinosa	7^{9}	4	4
(France) K Mladenovic	6^{7}	6	6
(Romania) A Cadanțu	6^{5}	1
WC	(Australia) O Rogowska	7^{7}	6
(Germany) A Beck	5	3
8	(Serbia) B Jovanovski	7	6
4	(Russia) A Pavlyuchenkova	3	2
(United States) A Riske	6	6
WC	(Australia) C Dellacqua	6	6
Q	(Belgium) A Van Uytvanck	4	4
(China) J Zheng	3	1
(China) S Zhang	6	6
(Austria) Y Meusburger	5	2
7	(Czech Republic) K Zakopalová	7	6

Second round
1	(Australia) S Stosur	6	2	7^{9}
(France) K Mladenovic	4	6	6^{7}
WC	(Australia) O Rogowska	6	2	0
8	(Serbia) B Jovanovski	3	6	6
(United States) A Riske	7	4	6
WC	(Australia) C Dellacqua	5	6	3
(China) S Zhang	1	2
7	(Czech Republic) K Zakopalová	6	6

Quarterfinals
1	(Australia) S Stosur	6	6
8	(Serbia) B Jovanovski	3	2
(United States) A Riske	4	5
7	(Czech Republic) K Zakopalová	6	7

Semifinals
1	(Australia) S Stosur	3	2
7	(Czech Republic) K Zakopalová	6	6

=== Bottom half ===
First round
6	(Germany) M Barthel	6	6
(Ukraine) E Svitolina	4	3
(Romania) M Niculescu	6	6
(Slovakia) M Rybáriková	2	0
Q	(Spain) E Cabeza Candela	7	6
(Italy) K Knapp	5	4
(Puerto Rico) M Puig	4	4
3	(Russia) E Vesnina	6	6
LL	(Belgium) A-S Mestach	1	1
Q	(Spain) G Muguruza	6	6
(United Kingdom) L Robson	6	0^{r}
(Belgium) Y Wickmayer	4	2
(China) S Peng	2	2
WC	(Australia) S Sanders	6	6
(New Zealand) M Erakovic	4	1
2	(Belgium) K Flipkens	6	6

Second round
6	(Germany) M Barthel	6^{5}	1
(Romania) M Niculescu	7^{7}	6
Q	(Spain) E Cabeza Candela	4	6	4
3	(Russia) E Vesnina	6	2	1^{r}
Q	(Spain) G Muguruza	4
(Belgium) Y Wickmayer	1^{r}
WC	(Australia) S Sanders	6	6^{3}	6^{5}
2	(Belgium) K Flipkens	4	7^{7}	7^{7}

Quarterfinals
(Romania) M Niculescu	6	6^{3}	4
Q	(Spain) E Cabeza Candela	3	7^{7}	6
Q	(Spain) G Muguruza	6	6
2	(Belgium) K Flipkens	4	3

Semifinals
Q	(Spain) E Cabeza Candela	0	1
Q	(Spain) G Muguruza	6	6

== Qualifying ==
=== Seeds ===
1. (Romania) Alexandra Cadanțu (moved to main draw)
2. (Spain) Garbiñe Muguruza (qualified)
3. (Spain) Lourdes Domínguez Lino (first round)
4. (Spain) Sílvia Soler Espinosa (qualifying competition, lucky loser)
5. (Israel) Julia Glushko (first round; retired)
6. (Brazil) Teliana Pereira (second round)
7. (Spain) Lara Arruabarrena (second round)
8. (Colombia) Mariana Duque (first round)
9. (Belgium) Alison Van Uytvanck (qualified)

=== Qualifiers ===
1. (Belgium) Alison Van Uytvanck
2. (Spain) Garbiñe Muguruza
3. (United States) Madison Brengle
4. (Spain) Estrella Cabeza Candela

=== Lucky losers ===
1. (Spain) Sílvia Soler Espinosa
2. (Belgium) An-Sophie Mestach

=== Draw ===
==== First qualifier ====
First round
9	(Belgium) Alison Van Uytvanck	6	6
(Kazakhstan) Sesil Karatantcheva	3	4
(Serbia) Jovana Jakšić	6	6
(Belarus) Aliaksandra Sasnovich	3	1
(Czech Republic) Kateřina Siniaková	7^{7}	0	0
(Belgium) An-Sophie Mestach	6^{5}	6	6
Alt	(Uzbekistan) Nigina Abduraimova	2	1
7	(Spain) Lara Arruabarrena	6	6

Second round
9	(Belgium) Alison Van Uytvanck	2	6	6
(Serbia) Jovana Jakšić	6	4	4
(Belgium) An-Sophie Mestach	6	6
7	(Spain) Lara Arruabarrena	4	0

Qualifying competition
9	(Belgium) Alison Van Uytvanck	6	6
(Belgium) An-Sophie Mestach	4	2

==== Second qualifier ====
First round
2	(Spain) Garbiñe Muguruza	6	6
(South Africa) Chanel Simmonds	1	0
(United States) Julia Cohen	3	1
(Romania) Alexandra Dulgheru	6	6
WC	(Australia) Naiktha Bains	6	6
(Italy) Maria Elena Camerin	1	4
(Argentina) María Irigoyen	5	2
6	(Brazil) Teliana Pereira	7	6

Second round
2	(Spain) Garbiñe Muguruza	6	6
(Romania) Alexandra Dulgheru	3	2
WC	(Australia) Naiktha Bains	6	6
6	(Brazil) Teliana Pereira	3	3

Qualifying competition
2	(Spain) Garbiñe Muguruza	6	6
WC	(Australia) Naiktha Bains	1	0

==== Third qualifier ====
First round
3	(Spain) Lourdes Domínguez Lino	6^{5}	3
(United States) Sachia Vickery	7^{7}	6
(Montenegro) Danka Kovinić	6	6
WC	(Australia) Olivia Tjandramulia	1	3
WC	(Australia) Kimberly Birrell	4	2
(United States) Madison Brengle	6	6
(France) Alizé Lim	7	6
8	(Colombia) Mariana Duque	5	3

Second round
(United States) Sachia Vickery	6	6
(Montenegro) Danka Kovinić	3	3
(United States) Madison Brengle	6	7^{7}
(France) Alizé Lim	4	6^{0}

Qualifying competition
(United States) Sachia Vickery	4	3
(United States) Madison Brengle	6	6

==== Fourth qualifier ====
First round
4	(Spain) Sílvia Soler Espinosa	6	6
(Belarus) Ilona Kremen	0	3
WC	(Australia) Azra Hadzic	0	1
(Czech Republic) Andrea Hlaváčková	6	6
(Spain) Estrella Cabeza Candela	6	6
(Ukraine) Anastasiya Vasylyeva	2	4
(Italy) Nastassja Burnett	6	2
5	(Israel) Julia Glushko	3	0^{r}

Second round
4	(Spain) Sílvia Soler Espinosa	6	2	6
(Czech Republic) Andrea Hlaváčková	3	6	3
(Spain) Estrella Cabeza Candela	6	7^{7}
(Italy) Nastassja Burnett	4	6^{3}

Qualifying competition
4	(Spain) Sílvia Soler Espinosa	6	5	4
(Spain) Estrella Cabeza Candela	4	7	6
