= 2011 HP Open – Doubles =

Doubles
- 2011 HP Open

Final
- Champions: (Japan) Kimiko Date-Krumm (China) Zhang Shuai
- Runners-up: (United States) Vania King (Kazakhstan) Yaroslava Shvedova
- Score: 7–5, 3–6, [11–9]

Events
Singles	Doubles
← 2010 ·	Japan Women's Open	· 2012 →

Chang Kai-chen and Lilia Osterloh were the defending champions, but Osterloh chose not to compete.

Chang played alongside Jill Craybas, but lost in the first round to Chan Chin-wei and Han Xinyun.

Fourth seeds Kimiko Date-Krumm and Zhang Shuai won the title, defeating two-time Grand Slam champions Vania King and Yaroslava Shvedova in the final.

== Seeds ==
1. (United States) Vania King / (Kazakhstan) Yaroslava Shvedova (final)
2. (Chinese Taipei) Hsieh Su-wei / (China) Zheng Jie (first round)
3. (United States) Raquel Kops-Jones / (United States) Abigail Spears (semifinals)
4. (Japan) Kimiko Date-Krumm / (China) Zhang Shuai (champions)

== Draw ==
=== Key ===
- Q = Qualifier
- WC = Wild card
- LL = Lucky loser
- Alt = Alternate
- SE = Special exempt
- PR = Protected ranking
- ITF = ITF entry
- JE = Junior exempt
- w/o = Walkover
- r = Retired
- d = Defaulted
- SR = Special ranking

=== Draw ===
First round
1	(United States) V King (Kazakhstan) Y Shvedova	7	6
(United States) L Lee-Waters (United States) M Moulton-Levy	5	4
(Hungary) M Czink (Hungary) K Marosi	6	2	[3]
(Greece) E Daniilidou (Luxembourg) M Minella	4	6	[10]
3	(United States) R Kops-Jones (United States) A Spears	6	6
WC	(Japan) M Doi (Japan) K Nara	2	2
(Chinese Taipei) C-W Chan (China) X Han	6	6
(Chinese Taipei) K-C Chang (United States) J Craybas	0	1
(China) W Liu (China) S Sun	2	6	[10]
(Thailand) N Lertcheewakarn (France) K Mladenovic	6	3	[2]
WC	(Japan) S Aoyama (Japan) K Takahata	4	7^{7}	[8]
4	(Japan) K Date-Krumm (China) S Zhang	6	6^{2}	[10]
(Chinese Taipei) Y-J Chan (Chinese Taipei) H-C Chan	5	7	[8]
(Australia) J Gajdošová (Germany) A Kerber	7	5	[10]
(Japan) R Fujiwara (Japan) A Morita	6	3	[10]
2	(Chinese Taipei) S-W Hsieh (China) J Zheng	2	6	[7]

Quarterfinals
1	(United States) V King (Kazakhstan) Y Shvedova	6	6
(Greece) E Daniilidou (Luxembourg) M Minella	2	1
3	(United States) R Kops-Jones (United States) A Spears	6	6
(Chinese Taipei) C-W Chan (China) X Han	2	3
(China) W Liu (China) S Sun	3	3
4	(Japan) K Date-Krumm (China) S Zhang	6	6
(Australia) J Gajdošová (Germany) A Kerber	2	7	[11]
(Japan) R Fujiwara (Japan) A Morita	6	5	[9]

Semifinals
1	(United States) V King (Kazakhstan) Y Shvedova	6	6
3	(United States) R Kops-Jones (United States) A Spears	0	2
4	(Japan) K Date-Krumm (China) S Zhang	6	6
(Australia) J Gajdošová (Germany) A Kerber	3	3

Final
1	(United States) V King (Kazakhstan) Y Shvedova	5	6	[9]
4	(Japan) K Date-Krumm (China) S Zhang	7	3	[11]
