= 2014 Hobart International =

- Date: 5–11 January 2014
- Edition: 21st
- Category: WTA International tournaments
- Draw: 32S / 16D
- Prize money: €250,000
- Surface: Hard
- Location: Hobart, Australia

Champions

Singles
- (Spain) Garbiñe Muguruza

Doubles
- (Romania) Monica Niculescu / (Czech Republic) Klára Zakopalová
← 2013 ·	Hobart International	· 2015 →

The 2014 Hobart International was a tennis tournament played on outdoor hard courts. It was the 21st edition of the event and part of the WTA International tournaments of the 2014 WTA Tour. It took place at the Hobart International Tennis Centre in Hobart, Australia from 5 through 11 January 2014.

== Finals ==
=== Singles ===
- (Spain) Garbiñe Muguruza defeated (Czech Republic) Klára Zakopalová, 6–4, 6–0

=== Doubles ===
- (Romania) Monica Niculescu / (Czech Republic) Klára Zakopalová defeated (United States) Lisa Raymond / (China) Zhang Shuai, 6–2, 6–7^{(5–7)}, [10–8]

== Points and prize money ==
=== Point distribution ===
Event	W	F	SF	QF	Round of 16	Round of 32	Q	Q3	Q2	Q1
Singles	280	180	110	60	30	1	18	14	10	1
Doubles	280	180	110	60	1	—	—	—	—	—

=== Prize money ===
Event	W	F	SF	QF	Round of 16	Round of 32^{1}	Q3	Q2	Q1
Singles	$43,000	$21,400	$11,300	$5,900	$3,310	$1,925	$1,005	$730	$530
Doubles	$12,300	$6,400	$3,435	$1,820	$960	—	—	—	—
Doubles prize money per team

_{^{1} Qualifiers prize money is also the Round of 32 prize money}

== Singles main-draw entrants ==
=== Seeds ===
Country	Player	Rank^{1}	Seed
AUS	Samantha Stosur	18	1
BEL	Kirsten Flipkens	20	2
RUS	Elena Vesnina	25	3
RUS	Anastasia Pavlyuchenkova	26	4
ITA	Flavia Pennetta	31	5
GER	Mona Barthel	34	6
CZE	Klára Zakopalová	35	7
SRB	Bojana Jovanovski	36	8

- ^{1} Rankings as of 30 December 2013.

=== Other entrants ===
The following players received wildcards into the singles main draw:

- (Australia) Casey Dellacqua
- (Australia) Olivia Rogowska
- (Australia) Storm Sanders

The following players received entry from the qualifying draw:

- (United States) Madison Brengle
- (Spain) Estrella Cabeza Candela
- (Spain) Garbiñe Muguruza
- (Belgium) Alison Van Uytvanck

The following players received entry as lucky loser:

- (Belgium) An-Sophie Mestach
- (Spain) Sílvia Soler Espinosa

=== Withdrawals ===
Before the tournament

- (Italy) Flavia Pennetta (wrist injury) → replaced by (Belgium) An-Sophie Mestach
- (Switzerland) Stefanie Vögele → replaced by (Germany) Annika Beck
- (United States) Venus Williams (fatigue) → replaced by (Spain) Sílvia Soler Espinosa

=== Retirements ===
- (United Kingdom) Laura Robson (wrist injury)
- (Russia) Elena Vesnina (left hip injury)
- (Belgium) Yanina Wickmayer (viral illness)

== Doubles main-draw entrants ==
=== Seeds ===
Country	Player	Country	Player	Rank^{1}	Seed
NZL	Marina Erakovic	CHN	Zheng Jie	45	1
USA	Lisa Raymond	CHN	Zhang Shuai	86	2
UKR	Irina Buryachok	GEO	Oksana Kalashnikova	125	3
TPE	Chan Yung-jan	SVK	Janette Husárová	139	4

- ^{1} Rankings as of 30 December 2013.

=== Other entrants ===
The following pair received wildcards into the doubles main draw:

- (Australia) Kimberly Birrell / (Australia) Olivia Tjandramulia
- (Australia) Olivia Rogowska / (Australia) Storm Sanders
