= 2016 Hobart International – Singles =

Singles
- 2016 Hobart International

Final
- Champion: (France) Alizé Cornet
- Runner-up: (Canada) Eugenie Bouchard
- Score: 6–1, 6–2

Details
- Draw: 32
- Seeds: 8

Events
Singles	Doubles
← 2015 ·	Hobart International	· 2017 →

Heather Watson was the defending champion, but lost in the quarterfinals to Johanna Larsson.

Alizé Cornet won the title, defeating Eugenie Bouchard in the final, 6–1, 6–2.

== Seeds ==
1. (United States) Sloane Stephens (withdrew)
2. (Italy) Camila Giorgi (quarterfinals)
3. (Slovakia) Dominika Cibulková (semifinals)
4. (Romania) Monica Niculescu (second round)
5. (United States) Madison Brengle (first round, retired)
6. (Czech Republic) Barbora Strýcová (first round)
7. (France) Alizé Cornet (champion)
8. (Belgium) Alison Van Uytvanck (second round)
9. (Germany) Mona Barthel (quarterfinals, withdrew)

== Draw ==
=== Key ===
- Q = Qualifier
- WC = Wild card
- LL = Lucky loser
- Alt = Alternate
- ITF = ITF entry
- PR = Protected ranking
- SR = Special ranking
- SE = Special exempt
- JE = Junior exempt
- JR = Junior Accelerator Programme entrant
- CO = College Accelerator Programme entrant
- NG = Next Gen Accelerator Program entrant
- w/o = Walkover
- r = Retired
- d = Defaulted

=== Finals ===
Semifinals
7	(France) Alizé Cornet	6	6
(Sweden) Johanna Larsson	1	1
3	(Slovakia) Dominika Cibulková	1	6	4
(Canada) Eugenie Bouchard	6	4	6

Final
7	(France) Alizé Cornet	6	6
(Canada) Eugenie Bouchard	1	2

=== Top half ===
First round
9	(Germany) M Barthel	6	6
(Japan) M Doi	4	4
Q	(Japan) N Osaka	6^{6}	7^{10}	6
WC	(Australia) J Wolfe	7^{8}	6^{8}	4
LL	(Paraguay) V Cepede Royg	6	2	6
Q	(Spain) L Pous Tió	3	6	1
(Czech Republic) D Allertová	4	5
7	(France) A Cornet	6	7
4	(Romania) M Niculescu	7	7
(United States) C McHale	5	5
(United Kingdom) H Watson	6	6
(Brazil) T Pereira	3	0
(Russia) M Gasparyan	6	6
WC	(Australia) M Inglis	4	3
(Sweden) J Larsson	6	6
6	(Czech Republic) B Strýcová	4	4

Second round
9	(Germany) M Barthel	7^{7}	6
Q	(Japan) N Osaka	6^{2}	2
LL	(Paraguay) V Cepede Royg	4	7	2
7	(France) A Cornet	6	5	6
4	(Romania) M Niculescu	7^{7}	2	6^{3}
(United Kingdom) H Watson	6^{3}	6	7^{7}
(Russia) M Gasparyan	3	6	3
(Sweden) J Larsson	6	3	6

Quarterfinals
9	(Germany) M Barthel
7	(France) A Cornet	w/o
(United Kingdom) H Watson	6	4	4
(Sweden) J Larsson	3	6	6

Semifinals
7	(France) A Cornet	6	6
(Sweden) J Larsson	1	1

=== Bottom half ===
First round
5	(United States) M Brengle	0	1^{r}
Q	(Netherlands) K Bertens	6	1
(Germany) A Beck	6	6
Q	(Japan) K Nara	4	3
(Montenegro) D Kovinić	4	3
WC	(Australia) K Birrell	6	6
(United Kingdom) J Konta	6^{6}	5
3	(Slovakia) D Cibulková	7^{8}	7
8	(Belgium) A Van Uytvanck	6	7^{7}
(Germany) C Witthöft	2	6^{5}
(Canada) E Bouchard	6	6
(United States) B Mattek-Sands	2	1
LL	(France) P Parmentier	6^{1}	1
(Japan) N Hibino	7^{7}	6
(Kazakhstan) Z Diyas	4	6	1
2	(Italy) C Giorgi	6	1	6

Second round
Q	(Netherlands) K Bertens	6	6
(Germany) A Beck	3	1
WC	(Australia) K Birrell	1	0
3	(Slovakia) D Cibulková	6	6
8	(Belgium) A Van Uytvanck	4	5
(Canada) E Bouchard	6	7
(Japan) N Hibino	2	3
2	(Italy) C Giorgi	6	6

Quarterfinals
Q	(Netherlands) K Bertens	5	3
3	(Slovakia) D Cibulková	7	6
(Canada) E Bouchard	6	6
2	(Italy) C Giorgi	3	2

Semifinals
3	(Slovakia) D Cibulková	1	6	4
(Canada) E Bouchard	6	4	6

== Qualifying ==
=== Seeds ===
1. (Germany) Tatjana Maria (first round)
2. (Serbia) Bojana Jovanovski (first round)
3. (Japan) Kurumi Nara (qualified)
4. (Ukraine) Kateryna Bondarenko (first round)
5. (Poland) Urszula Radwańska (second round)
6. (Czech Republic) Klára Koukalová (first round)
7. (Spain) Lourdes Domínguez Lino (first round)
8. (Netherlands) Kiki Bertens (qualified)

=== Qualifiers ===
1. (Japan) Naomi Osaka
2. (Netherlands) Kiki Bertens
3. (Japan) Kurumi Nara
4. (Spain) Laura Pous Tió

=== Lucky losers ===
1. (France) Pauline Parmentier
2. (Paraguay) Verónica Cepede Royg

=== Draw ===
==== First qualifier ====
First round
1	(Germany) Tatjana Maria	5	7^{8}	3
(Japan) Naomi Osaka	7	6^{6}	6
(Belgium) Ysaline Bonaventure	6	6
(United States) Jessica Pegula	2	0
(France) Océane Dodin	6	6
(Netherlands) Cindy Burger	4	0
(Croatia) Jana Fett	6	4	6
6	(Czech Republic) Klára Koukalová	1	6	1

Second round
(Japan) Naomi Osaka	2	6	6
(Belgium) Ysaline Bonaventure	6	3	2
(France) Océane Dodin	6	6
(Croatia) Jana Fett	2	0

Qualifying competition
(Japan) Naomi Osaka	6	6
(France) Océane Dodin	4	2

==== Second qualifier ====
First round
2	(Serbia) Bojana Jovanovski	0	0
(Paraguay) Verónica Cepede Royg	6	6
(Spain) María Teresa Torró Flor	6	6
WC	(Australia) Belinda Woolcock	4	4
(Greece) Maria Sakkari	7^{7}	6
(Japan) Makoto Ninomiya	6^{5}	4
(Czech Republic) Tereza Smitková	4	6^{1}
8	(Netherlands) Kiki Bertens	6	7^{7}

Second round
(Paraguay) Verónica Cepede Royg	6	6
(Spain) María Teresa Torró Flor	3	3
(Greece) Maria Sakkari	6	0	1
8	(Netherlands) Kiki Bertens	4	6	6

Qualifying competition
(Paraguay) Verónica Cepede Royg	5	1
8	(Netherlands) Kiki Bertens	7	6

==== Third qualifier ====
First round
3	(Japan) Kurumi Nara	7^{7}	6
(Spain) Sara Sorribes Tormo	6^{4}	1
(United States) Katerina Stewart	6	4	6
(France) Alizé Lim	2	6	2
(Netherlands) Richèl Hogenkamp	6	6
WC	(Australia) Naiktha Bains	3	1
WC	(Australia) Destanee Aiava	0	1
5	(Poland) Urszula Radwańska	6	6

Second round
3	(Japan) Kurumi Nara	6	6
(United States) Katerina Stewart	2	1
(Netherlands) Richèl Hogenkamp	4	6	6
5	(Poland) Urszula Radwańska	6	3	2

Qualifying competition
3	(Japan) Kurumi Nara	7^{7}	6
(Netherlands) Richèl Hogenkamp	6^{2}	3

==== Fourth qualifier ====
First round
4	(Ukraine) Kateryna Bondarenko	2	2
(France) Pauline Parmentier	6	6
(Czech Republic) Tereza Martincová	6	6
(Canada) Aleksandra Wozniak	4	0
(Poland) Katarzyna Piter	3	2
(Spain) Laura Pous Tió	6	6
WC	(Australia) Zoe Hives	7^{7}	7^{8}
7	(Spain) Lourdes Domínguez Lino	6^{2}	6^{6}

Second round
(France) Pauline Parmentier	6	6
(Czech Republic) Tereza Martincová	3	1
(Spain) Laura Pous Tió	6	6
WC	(Australia) Zoe Hives	3	2

Qualifying competition
(France) Pauline Parmentier	6	0	0
(Spain) Laura Pous Tió	1	6	6
