= 2015 Hobart International – Singles =

Singles
- 2015 Hobart International

Final
- Champion: (United Kingdom) Heather Watson
- Runner-up: (United States) Madison Brengle
- Score: 6–3, 6–4

Details
- Draw: 32 (4 Q / 3 WC )
- Seeds: 8

Events
Singles	Doubles
← 2014 ·	Hobart International	· 2016 →

Garbiñe Muguruza was the defending champion, but chose to compete at the Sydney tennis event instead of Hobart. In the final, it was unseeded Briton Heather Watson who defeated the American qualifier in Madison Brengle, 6–3, 6–4 to record her second WTA title.

== Seeds ==
1. (Australia) Casey Dellacqua (second round)
2. (Kazakhstan) Zarina Diyas (quarterfinals)
3. (Italy) Camila Giorgi (quarterfinals)
4. (United States) Varvara Lepchenko (withdrew)
5. (United States) Sloane Stephens (second round)
6. (Czech Republic) Klára Koukalová (first round)
7. (Germany) Mona Barthel (first round)
8. (United States) Alison Riske (semifinals)
9. (Italy) Roberta Vinci (quarterfinals)

== Draw ==
Key

- Q = Qualifier
- WC = Wild card
- LL = Lucky loser
- Alt = Alternate
- ITF = ITF entry
- PR = Protected ranking
- SR = Special ranking
- SE = Special exempt
- JE = Junior exempt
- JR = Junior Accelerator Programme entrant
- CO = College Accelerator Programme entrant
- NG = Next Gen Accelerator Program entrant
- w/o = Walkover
- r = Retired
- d = Defaulted

=== Finals ===
Semifinals
Q	(United States) Madison Brengle	6	1	6
(Japan) Kurumi Nara	4	6	3
(United Kingdom) Heather Watson	6	7
8	(United States) Alison Riske	3	5

Final
Q	(United States) Madison Brengle	3	4
(United Kingdom) Heather Watson	6	6

=== Top half ===
First round
1	(Australia) C Dellacqua	6	1	6
(United States) L Davis	4	6	4
(Italy) K Knapp	7	6
(Croatia) A Tomljanović	5	2
Q	(Ukraine) K Kozlova	4	6	6
(Belgium) K Flipkens	6	3	4
Q	(United States) M Brengle	6^{6}	7	7^{7}
7	(Germany) M Barthel	7^{8}	5	6^{2}
3	(Italy) C Giorgi	5	6	7^{8}
WC	(Australia) S Sanders	7	1	6^{6}
(Puerto Rico) M Puig	4	1
(Estonia) K Kanepi	6	6
Q	(Sweden) J Larsson	3	1
SE	(China) S Zheng	6	0^{r}
(Japan) K Nara	0	6	6
6	(Czech Republic) K Koukalová	6	2	1

Second round
1	(Australia) C Dellacqua	5	6	3
(Italy) K Knapp	7	2	6
Q	(Ukraine) K Kozlova	1	6^{8}
Q	(United States) M Brengle	6	7^{10}
3	(Italy) C Giorgi	w/o
(Estonia) K Kanepi
Q	(Sweden) J Larsson	6^{1}	4
(Japan) K Nara	7^{7}	6

Quarterfinals
(Italy) K Knapp	7^{7}	4	4
Q	(United States) M Brengle	6^{3}	6	6
3	(Italy) C Giorgi	1	6	2
(Japan) K Nara	6	3	6

Semifinals
Q	(United States) M Brengle	6	1	6
(Japan) K Nara	4	6	3

=== Bottom half ===
First round
9	(Italy) R Vinci	6	4	6
WC	(Australia) O Rogowska	1	6	3
(Slovakia) J Čepelová	7^{7}	5	4
(Germany) A Beck	6^{4}	7	6
(United Kingdom) H Watson	7	6
(Slovakia) M Rybáriková	5	1
(Romania) M Niculescu	4	2
5	(United States) S Stephens	6	6
8	(United States) A Riske	6	0
(United States) C McHale	4	0^{r}
(Croatia) M Lučić-Baroni	2^{r}
(Serbia) B Jovanovski	5
Q	(Netherlands) R Hogenkamp	6^{10}	6^{5}
WC	(Slovakia) D Hantuchová	7^{12}	7^{7}
LL	(Spain) S Soler Espinosa	3	4
2	(Kazakhstan) Z Diyas	6	6

Second round
9	(Italy) R Vinci	3	6	6
(Germany) A Beck	6	3	3
(United Kingdom) H Watson	6	6
5	(United States) S Stephens	3	1
8	(United States) A Riske	6	4	6
(Serbia) B Jovanovski	2	6	1
WC	(Slovakia) D Hantuchová	5	1
2	(Kazakhstan) Z Diyas	7	6

Quarterfinals
9	(Italy) R Vinci	6^{0}	2
(United Kingdom) H Watson	7^{7}	6
8	(United States) A Riske	6	6
2	(Kazakhstan) Z Diyas	3	0

Semifinals
(United Kingdom) H Watson	6	7
8	(United States) A Riske	3	5

== Qualifying ==
=== Seeds ===
1. (Spain) Sílvia Soler Espinosa (qualifying competition, lucky loser)
2. (Netherlands) Kiki Bertens (second round)
3. (Sweden) Johanna Larsson (qualified)
4. (Russia) Vitalia Diatchenko (second round)
5. (Spain) Lara Arruabarrena (first round)
6. (Spain) María Teresa Torró Flor (second round)
7. (United States) Madison Brengle (qualified)
8. (Belgium) An-Sophie Mestach (second round, withdrew)

=== Qualifiers ===
1. (United States) Madison Brengle
2. (Ukraine) Kateryna Kozlova
3. (Sweden) Johanna Larsson
4. (Netherlands) Richèl Hogenkamp

=== Lucky loser ===
1. (Spain) Sílvia Soler Espinosa

=== Draw ===
==== First qualifier ====
First round
1	(Spain) Sílvia Soler Espinosa	6	6
(Colombia) Mariana Duque Mariño	3	2
(United States) Taylor Townsend	6	7
(Germany) Carina Witthöft	3	5
(Poland) Katarzyna Piter	4	3
(United Kingdom) Naomi Broady	6	6
(Russia) Marina Melnikova	4	1
7	(United States) Madison Brengle	6	6

Second round
1	(Spain) Sílvia Soler Espinosa	6	6
(United States) Taylor Townsend	2	3
(United Kingdom) Naomi Broady	3	0
7	(United States) Madison Brengle	6	6

Qualifying competition
1	(Spain) Sílvia Soler Espinosa	4	3
7	(United States) Madison Brengle	6	6

==== Second qualifier ====
First round
2	(Netherlands) Kiki Bertens	6	6
(Czech Republic) Denisa Allertová	3	4
(Belgium) Alison Van Uytvanck	2	6	2
(Czech Republic) Barbora Krejčíková	6	4	6
(Ukraine) Kateryna Kozlova	6	6
(France) Virginie Razzano	3	1
(United States) Grace Min	5	3
6	(Spain) María Teresa Torró Flor	7	6

Second round
2	(Netherlands) Kiki Bertens	4	6^{1}
(Czech Republic) Barbora Krejčíková	6	7^{7}
(Ukraine) Kateryna Kozlova	6	6
6	(Spain) María Teresa Torró Flor	0	3

Qualifying competition
(Czech Republic) Barbora Krejčíková	0	5
(Ukraine) Kateryna Kozlova	6	7

==== Third qualifier ====
First round
3	(Sweden) Johanna Larsson	6	6
WC	(Australia) Naiktha Bains	0	3
(Montenegro) Danka Kovinić	6	6
Alt	(Argentina) María Irigoyen	4	2
(Ukraine) Anastasiya Vasylyeva	6	6^{2}	5
(Spain) Lourdes Domínguez Lino	3	7^{7}	7
(Argentina) Paula Ormaechea	2	6	7
5	(Spain) Lara Arruabarrena	6	4	5

Second round
3	(Sweden) Johanna Larsson	6	6
(Montenegro) Danka Kovinić	1	3
(Spain) Lourdes Domínguez Lino	2	1
(Argentina) Paula Ormaechea	6	6

Qualifying competition
3	(Sweden) Johanna Larsson	6	6
(Argentina) Paula Ormaechea	3	2

==== Fourth qualifier ====
First round
4	(Russia) Vitalia Diatchenko	6	6
WC	(Australia) Kimberly Birrell	3	3
WC	(Australia) Maddison Inglis	6^{5}	4
(China) Zhu Lin	7^{7}	6
(Netherlands) Richèl Hogenkamp	7^{7}	3
(Austria) Patricia Mayr-Achleitner	6^{5}	2^{r}
WC	(Australia) Priscilla Hon	5	4
8	(Belgium) An-Sophie Mestach	7	6

Second round
4	(Russia) Vitalia Diatchenko	6	3	4
(China) Zhu Lin	2	6	6
(Netherlands) Richèl Hogenkamp	w/o
8	(Belgium) An-Sophie Mestach

Qualifying competition
(China) Zhu Lin	4	3
(Netherlands) Richèl Hogenkamp	6	6
