= 2016 Monterrey Open – Singles =

Singles
- 2016 Monterrey Open

Final
- Champion: (United Kingdom) Heather Watson
- Runner-up: (Belgium) Kirsten Flipkens
- Score: 3–6, 6–2, 6–3

Details
- Draw: 32
- Seeds: 8

Events
| Singles | Doubles |
- Monterrey Open

Timea Bacsinszky was the defending champion, but chose not to participate this year.

Heather Watson won the title, defeating Kirsten Flipkens in the final, 3–6, 6–2, 6–3.

== Seeds ==
1. (Italy) Sara Errani (second round)
2. (Denmark) Caroline Wozniacki (quarterfinals)
3. (Russia) Anastasia Pavlyuchenkova (first round)
4. (United Kingdom) Johanna Konta (quarterfinals)
5. (France) Caroline Garcia (semifinals)
6. (Belgium) Alison Van Uytvanck (second round)
7. (Montenegro) Danka Kovinić (first round)
8. (Hungary) Tímea Babos (first round)

== Draw ==
Key

- Q = Qualifier
- WC = Wild card
- LL = Lucky loser
- Alt = Alternate
- ITF = ITF entry
- PR = Protected ranking
- SR = Special ranking
- SE = Special exempt
- JE = Junior exempt
- JR = Junior Accelerator Programme entrant
- CO = College Accelerator Programme entrant
- NG = Next Gen Accelerator Program entrant
- w/o = Walkover
- r = Retired
- d = Defaulted

=== Finals ===
Semifinals
(Estonia) Anett Kontaveit | 6^{6} | 4
(Belgium) Kirsten Flipkens | 7^{8} | 6
5 | (France) Caroline Garcia | 1 | 2
(United Kingdom) Heather Watson | 6 | 6

Final
(Belgium) Kirsten Flipkens | 6 | 2 | 3
(United Kingdom) Heather Watson | 3 | 6 | 6

=== Top half ===
First round
1 | (Italy) S Errani | 6 | 3 | 6
(Slovakia) M Rybáriková | 1 | 6 | 4
(Slovakia) D Cibulková | 4 | 4
(Estonia) A Kontaveit | 6 | 6
(United States) C McHale | 6 | 6
WC | (Mexico) V Rodríguez | 0 | 4
Q | (United States) N Gibbs | 7 | 6
7 | (Montenegro) D Kovinić | 5 | 2
4 | (United Kingdom) J Konta | 6 | 6
(Colombia) M Duque Mariño | 3 | 3
(Belgium) Y Wickmayer | 6 | 4 | 6
(Sweden) J Larsson | 2 | 6 | 1
WC | (Italy) F Schiavone | 3 | 6^{5}
(Belgium) K Flipkens | 6 | 7^{7}
(United States) I Falconi | 4 | 2
6 | (Belgium) A Van Uytvanck | 6 | 6

Second round
1 | (Italy) S Errani | 1 | 3
(Estonia) A Kontaveit | 6 | 6
(United States) C McHale | 6^{5} | 7^{7} | 0^{r}
Q | (United States) N Gibbs | 7^{7} | 6^{4} | 3
4 | (United Kingdom) J Konta | 7^{8} | 7^{7}
(Belgium) Y Wickmayer | 6^{6} | 6^{4}
(Belgium) K Flipkens | 6 | 4 | 6
6 | (Belgium) A Van Uytvanck | 2 | 6 | 3

Quarterfinals
(Estonia) A Kontaveit | 6 | 6
Q | (United States) N Gibbs | 1 | 4
4 | (United Kingdom) J Konta | 3 | 7^{7} | 1
(Belgium) K Flipkens | 6 | 6^{2} | 6

Semifinals
(Estonia) A Kontaveit | 6^{6} | 4
(Belgium) K Flipkens | 7^{8} | 6

=== Bottom half ===
First round
5 | (France) C Garcia | 6 | 6
Q | (Croatia) P Martić | 3 | 4
Q | (Israel) J Glushko | 6 | 6
(Romania) A Dulgheru | 1 | 1
WC | (Mexico) M Zacarías | 2 | 5
(Puerto Rico) M Puig | 6 | 7
Q | (France) P Parmentier | 6 | 6
3 | (Russia) A Pavlyuchenkova | 2 | 2
8 | (Hungary) T Babos | 3 | 2
(Slovenia) P Hercog | 6 | 6
(United Kingdom) H Watson | 6 | 6^{0} | 6
(Japan) M Doi | 4 | 7^{7} | 3
(Germany) T Maria | 5 | 4
(Croatia) M Lučić-Baroni | 7 | 6
(Belarus) O Govortsova | 1 | 2
2 | (Denmark) C Wozniacki | 6 | 6

Second round
5 | (France) C Garcia | 6 | 6
Q | (Israel) J Glushko | 1 | 2
(Puerto Rico) M Puig | 3 | 4
Q | (France) P Parmentier | 6 | 6
(Slovenia) P Hercog | 2 | 3
(United Kingdom) H Watson | 6 | 6
(Croatia) M Lučić-Baroni | 4 | 4
2 | (Denmark) C Wozniacki | 6 | 6

Quarterfinals
5 | (France) C Garcia | 7 | 6
Q | (France) P Parmentier | 5 | 2
(United Kingdom) H Watson | 7 | 6
2 | (Denmark) C Wozniacki | 5 | 4

Semifinals
5 | (France) C Garcia | 1 | 2
(United Kingdom) H Watson | 6 | 6

== Qualifying ==
=== Seeds ===
1. (United States) Lauren Davis (qualifying competition)
2. (United States) Nicole Gibbs (qualified)
3. (Spain) Lourdes Domínguez Lino (second round)
4. (Netherlands) Kiki Bertens (qualifying competition)
5. (United States) Samantha Crawford (second round)
6. (United States) Anna Tatishvili (qualifying competition)
7. (France) Pauline Parmentier (qualified)
8. (China) Han Xinyun (second round)

=== Qualifiers ===
1. (Croatia) Petra Martić
2. (United States) Nicole Gibbs
3. (Israel) Julia Glushko
4. (France) Pauline Parmentier

=== Draw ===
==== First qualifier ====
First round
1 | (United States) Lauren Davis | 4 | 7^{7} | 6
(United States) Louisa Chirico | 6 | 6^{4} | 1
(Sweden) Rebecca Peterson | 3 | 5
(Russia) Alla Kudryavtseva | 6 | 7
(Croatia) Petra Martić | 6 | 6
WC | (Kazakhstan) Galina Voskoboeva | 2 | 4
(Belgium) An-Sophie Mestach | 5 | 7 | 0
5 | (United States) Samantha Crawford | 7 | 5 | 6

Second round
1 | (United States) Lauren Davis | 6 | 6
(Russia) Alla Kudryavtseva | 2 | 4
(Croatia) Petra Martić | 7 | 6
5 | (United States) Samantha Crawford | 5 | 2

Qualifying competition
1 | (United States) Lauren Davis | 4 | 6 | 1
(Croatia) Petra Martić | 6 | 3 | 6

==== Second qualifier ====
First round
2 | (United States) Nicole Gibbs | 6 | 6
WC | (Mexico) Renata Zarazúa | 1 | 1
(Luxembourg) Mandy Minella | 6 | 6
WC | (Mexico) Ana Sofía Sánchez | 1 | 3
(Poland) Paula Kania | 6 | 3 | 7
(Greece) Maria Sakkari | 3 | 6 | 5
(United States) Maria Sanchez | 6 | 2 | 4
6 | (United States) Anna Tatishvili | 0 | 6 | 6

Second round
2 | (United States) Nicole Gibbs | 6 | 6
(Luxembourg) Mandy Minella | 3 | 1
(Poland) Paula Kania | 0 | 1
6 | (United States) Anna Tatishvili | 6 | 6

Qualifying competition
2 | (United States) Nicole Gibbs | 6 | 6
6 | (United States) Anna Tatishvili | 0 | 4

==== Third qualifier ====
First round
3 | (Spain) Lourdes Domínguez Lino | 6 | 6
(Portugal) Michelle Larcher de Brito | 4 | 2
(Paraguay) Verónica Cepede Royg | 5 | 7^{7} | 3
(New Zealand) Marina Erakovic | 7 | 6^{5} | 6
(Japan) Hiroko Kuwata | 2 | 1
(Israel) Julia Glushko | 6 | 6
WC | (Venezuela) Andrea Gámiz | 1 | 3
8 | (China) Han Xinyun | 6 | 6

Second round
3 | (Spain) Lourdes Domínguez Lino | 2 | 1
(New Zealand) Marina Erakovic | 6 | 6
(Israel) Julia Glushko | 6 | 6
8 | (China) Han Xinyun | 4 | 4

Qualifying competition
(New Zealand) Marina Erakovic | 0 | 4
(Israel) Julia Glushko | 6 | 6

==== Fourth qualifier ====
First round
4 | (Netherlands) Kiki Bertens | 4 | 7 | 6
(France) Mathilde Johansson | 6 | 5 | 2
(Israel) Shahar Pe'er | 4 | 5
(Switzerland) Viktorija Golubic | 6 | 7
(Argentina) María Irigoyen | 7 | 1 | 5
(Netherlands) Richèl Hogenkamp | 5 | 6 | 7
(Spain) Sílvia Soler Espinosa | 4 | 2
7 | (France) Pauline Parmentier | 6 | 6

Second round
4 | (Netherlands) Kiki Bertens | 5 | 6 | 6
(Switzerland) Viktorija Golubic | 7 | 4 | 3
(Netherlands) Richèl Hogenkamp | 5 | 2
7 | (France) Pauline Parmentier | 7 | 6

Qualifying competition
4 | (Netherlands) Kiki Bertens | 4 | 6 | 5
7 | (France) Pauline Parmentier | 6 | 3 | 7
