= 2012 HP Open – Doubles =

Doubles
- 2012 HP Open

Final
- Champions: (United States) Raquel Kops-Jones (United States) Abigail Spears
- Runners-up: (Japan) Kimiko Date-Krumm (United Kingdom) Heather Watson
- Score: 6–1, 6–4

Details
- Draw: 16
- Seeds: 4

Events
Singles	Doubles
← 2011 ·	Japan Women's Open	· 2013 →

Kimiko Date-Krumm and Zhang Shuai were the defending champions but Zhang decided not to participate.
Date-Krumm played alongside Heather Watson and they reached the final but lost to the American pair Raquel Kops-Jones and Abigail Spears with the score of 1–6, 4–6.

== Seeds ==
1. (United States) Raquel Kops-Jones / (United States) Abigail Spears (champions)
2. (Spain) Anabel Medina Garrigues / (China) Zheng Jie (semifinals)
3. (Croatia) Darija Jurak / (Hungary) Katalin Marosi (semifinals)
4. (Japan) Kimiko Date-Krumm / (United Kingdom) Heather Watson (final)

== Draw ==
=== Key ===
- Q = Qualifier
- WC = Wild card
- LL = Lucky loser
- Alt = Alternate
- SE = Special exempt
- PR = Protected ranking
- ITF = ITF entry
- JE = Junior exempt
- w/o = Walkover
- r = Retired
- d = Defaulted
- SR = Special ranking

=== Draw ===
First round
1	(United States) R Kops-Jones (United States) A Spears	6	6
(Japan) M Eguchi (Japan) J Namigata	2	3
(United States) J Cohen (China) Y Zhou	1	4
(Thailand) L Kumkhum (Japan) M Miyamura	6	6
3	(Croatia) D Jurak (Hungary) K Marosi	4	6	[10]
(Chinese Taipei) K-c Chang (Thailand) N Lertcheewakarn	6	4	[7]
(Greece) E Daniilidou (Thailand) T Tanasugarn
(Russia) K Lykina (Russia) O Puchkova	w/o
(Japan) S Aoyama (United States) M Moulton-Levy	7	6
WC	(Japan) K Nara (Japan) E Sema	5	2
(Canada) E Bouchard (United States) A Glatch	3	2
4	(Japan) K Date-Krumm (United Kingdom) H Watson	6	6
(Japan) R Fujiwara (Thailand) V Wongteanchai	6	6
(Japan) M Doi (Japan) R Sawayanagi	3	4
(Australia) C Dellacqua (South Africa) C Scheepers	4	4
2	(Spain) A Medina Garrigues (China) J Zheng	6	6

Quarterfinals
1	(United States) R Kops-Jones (United States) A Spears	6	6
(Thailand) L Kumkhum (Japan) M Miyamura	3	1
3	(Croatia) D Jurak (Hungary) K Marosi	6	6
(Russia) K Lykina (Russia) O Puchkova	1	2
(Japan) S Aoyama (United States) M Moulton-Levy	6^{7}	1
4	(Japan) K Date-Krumm (United Kingdom) H Watson	7^{9}	6
(Japan) R Fujiwara (Thailand) V Wongteanchai	3	5
2	(Spain) A Medina Garrigues (China) J Zheng	6	7

Semifinals
1	(United States) R Kops-Jones (United States) A Spears	6	6
3	(Croatia) D Jurak (Hungary) K Marosi	1	2
4	(Japan) K Date-Krumm (United Kingdom) H Watson	6	4	[10]
2	(Spain) A Medina Garrigues (China) J Zheng	3	6	[8]

Final
1	(United States) R Kops-Jones (United States) A Spears	6	6
4	(Japan) K Date-Krumm (United Kingdom) H Watson	1	4
