= 2015 Hobart International – Doubles =

Doubles
- 2015 Hobart International

Final
- Champions: (Netherlands) Kiki Bertens (Sweden) Johanna Larsson
- Runners-up: (Russia) Vitalia Diatchenko (Romania) Monica Niculescu
- Score: 7–5, 6–3

Details
- Draw: 16
- Seeds: 4

Events
Singles	Doubles
- Hobart International

Monica Niculescu and Klára Koukalová were the defending champions, but Koukalová chose not to participate.
Niculescu partnered Vitalia Diatchenko, but lost in the final to Kiki Bertens and Johanna Larsson, 5–7, 3–6.

== Seeds ==
1. (Zimbabwe) Cara Black / (China) Zheng Saisai (first round, retired)
2. (Poland) Klaudia Jans-Ignacik / (Slovenia) Andreja Klepač (first round)
3. (Croatia) Darija Jurak / (United States) Megan Moulton-Levy (first round)
4. (Spain) Lara Arruabarrena / (Romania) Raluca Olaru (semifinals)

== Draw ==
Key

- Q = Qualifier
- WC = Wild card
- LL = Lucky loser
- Alt = Alternate
- ITF = ITF entry
- PR = Protected ranking
- SR = Special ranking
- SE = Special exempt
- JE = Junior exempt
- JR = Junior Accelerator Programme entrant
- CO = College Accelerator Programme entrant
- NG = Next Gen Accelerator Program entrant
- w/o = Walkover
- r = Retired
- d = Defaulted

First round
1	(Zimbabwe) C Black (China) S Zheng	0^{r}
(Russia) V Diatchenko (Romania) M Niculescu	3
(Slovakia) J Čepelová (Poland) A Rosolska	4	6	[10]
(Chinese Taipei) C-j Chuang (Czech Republic) E Hrdinová	6	4	[4]
3	(Croatia) D Jurak (United States) M Moulton-Levy	6	4	[3]
(United States) S Stephens (United States) T Townsend	4	6	[10]
(Australia) M Adamczak (Australia) O Rogowska	7	2	[9]
(Croatia) A Tomljanović (United Kingdom) H Watson	5	6	[11]
(Spain) S Soler Espinosa (Spain) MT Torró Flor	6	6
(Chinese Taipei) C-y Hsu (United States) N Melichar	2	3
(Chinese Taipei) C-w Chan (Georgia (country)) O Kalashnikova	4	6^{5}
4	(Spain) L Arruabarrena (Romania) R Olaru	6	7^{7}
(Australia) A Nancarrow (Australia) S Sanders	w/o
(Croatia) M Lučić-Baroni (United States) L Raymond
(Netherlands) K Bertens (Sweden) J Larsson	6	7
2	(Poland) K Jans-Ignacik (Slovenia) A Klepač	4	5

Quarterfinals
(Russia) V Diatchenko (Romania) M Niculescu	6	6
(Slovakia) J Čepelová (Poland) A Rosolska	3	0
(United States) S Stephens (United States) T Townsend
(Croatia) A Tomljanović (United Kingdom) H Watson	w/o
(Spain) S Soler Espinosa (Spain) MT Torró Flor	2	6	[6]
4	(Spain) L Arruabarrena (Romania) R Olaru	6	3	[10]
(Australia) A Nancarrow (Australia) S Sanders	4	4
(Netherlands) K Bertens (Sweden) J Larsson	6	6

Semifinals
(Russia) V Diatchenko (Romania) M Niculescu	6	6
(Croatia) A Tomljanović (United Kingdom) H Watson	2	3
4	(Spain) L Arruabarrena (Romania) R Olaru	6	3	[5]
(Netherlands) K Bertens (Sweden) J Larsson	2	6	[10]

Final
(Russia) V Diatchenko (Romania) M Niculescu	5	3
(Netherlands) K Bertens (Sweden) J Larsson	7	6
