= 2012 HP Open – Singles =

Singles
- 2012 HP Open

Final
- Champion: (United Kingdom) Heather Watson
- Runner-up: (Chinese Taipei) Chang Kai-chen
- Score: 7–5, 5–7, 7–6^{(7–4)}

Details
- Draw: 32
- Seeds: 8

Events
Singles	Doubles
- Japan Women's Open

Marion Bartoli was the defending champion, but chose not to compete.

Heather Watson won the title after a marathon 3 hour 12 minute battle with Chang Kai-chen. The match saw Watson hold match point before Chang came back and won the second set. Chang went up a break and had multiple match points at 5–4 before Watson broke and won a final-set tiebreak. Watson won by a score of 7–5, 5–7, 7–6^{(7–4)}. Watson became the first British player to win the WTA Tour level since Sara Gomer in the 1988 Women's California State Championships.

== Seeds ==
1. (Australia) Samantha Stosur (semifinals)
2. (China) Zheng Jie (second round)
3. (United States) Christina McHale (first round)
4. (Italy) Francesca Schiavone (first round, retired)
5. (Kazakhstan) Yaroslava Shvedova (first round)
6. (Spain) Anabel Medina Garrigues (second round)
7. (South Africa) Chanelle Scheepers (quarterfinals)
8. (United Kingdom) Laura Robson (quarterfinals)

== Draw ==
Key

- Q = Qualifier
- WC = Wild card
- LL = Lucky loser
- Alt = Alternate
- ITF = ITF entry
- PR = Protected ranking
- SR = Special ranking
- SE = Special exempt
- JE = Junior exempt
- JR = Junior Accelerator Programme entrant
- CO = College Accelerator Programme entrant
- NG = Next Gen Accelerator Program entrant
- w/o = Walkover
- r = Retired
- d = Defaulted

=== Finals ===
Semifinals
1	(Australia) Samantha Stosur	4	6	6^{3}
(Chinese Taipei) Chang Kai-chen	6	4	7^{7}
(Japan) Misaki Doi	6^{2}	5
(United Kingdom) Heather Watson	7^{7}	7

Final
(Chinese Taipei) Chang Kai-chen	5	7	6^{4}
(United Kingdom) Heather Watson	7	5	7^{7}

=== Top half ===
First round
1	(Australia) S Stosur	6	6
(Japan) E Sema	4	2
Q	(Thailand) N Luangnam	3	3
(France) V Razzano	6	6
(Japan) A Morita	3	2
(United States) J Hampton	6	6
WC	(Thailand) T Tanasugarn	6	6
5	(Kazakhstan) Y Shvedova	3	2
3	(United States) C McHale	3	6^{5}
(Chinese Taipei) K-c Chang	6	7^{7}
(Japan) K Date-Krumm	3	6	4
(Australia) C Dellacqua	6	3	6
Q	(China) Y Zhou	7	6
WC	(Japan) K Nara	5	4
(Greece) E Daniilidou	4	2
8	(United Kingdom) L Robson	6	6

Second round
1	(Australia) S Stosur	1	6	6
(France) V Razzano	6	2	4
(United States) J Hampton	7	7
WC	(Thailand) T Tanasugarn	5	5
(Chinese Taipei) K-c Chang	7^{7}	6
(Australia) C Dellacqua	6^{4}	3
Q	(China) Y Zhou	4	4
8	(United Kingdom) L Robson	6	6

Quarterfinals
1	(Australia) S Stosur	6	6
(United States) J Hampton	2	4
(Chinese Taipei) K-c Chang	6	3	7^{7}
8	(United Kingdom) L Robson	4	6	6^{4}

Semifinals
1	(Australia) S Stosur	4	6	6^{3}
(Chinese Taipei) K-c Chang	6	4	7^{7}

=== Bottom half ===
First round
7	(South Africa) C Scheepers	6	6
(United States) A Glatch	4	1
(Croatia) M Lučić	4	6	6
Q	(Thailand) L Kumkhum	6	3	4
(Japan) M Doi	7	3	6
(United States) J Cohen	5	6	0
Q	(Russia) O Puchkova	6	2
4/WC	(Italy) F Schiavone	4	1^{r}
6	(Spain) A Medina Garrigues	3	6	6
(Italy) C Giorgi	6	2	2
(United Kingdom) H Watson	6	6
(Slovenia) P Hercog	4	4
(France) M Johansson	2	2
(France) P Parmentier	6	6
(Spain) MJ Martínez Sánchez	6	5	4
2	(China) J Zheng	4	7	6

Second round
7	(South Africa) C Scheepers	6	6
(Croatia) M Lučić	2	2
(Japan) M Doi	6	6
Q	(Russia) O Puchkova	3	2
6	(Spain) A Medina Garrigues	7^{7}	2	3
(United Kingdom) H Watson	6^{4}	6	6
(France) P Parmentier	6	6
2	(China) J Zheng	3	4

Quarterfinals
7	(South Africa) C Scheepers	6	1	3
(Japan) M Doi	2	6	6
(United Kingdom) H Watson	7	6
(France) P Parmentier	5	3

Semifinals
(Japan) M Doi	6^{2}	5
(United Kingdom) H Watson	7^{7}	7

== Qualifying ==
=== Seeds ===
1. (Sweden) Johanna Larsson (qualifying competition)
2. (Russia) Olga Puchkova (qualified)
3. (Canada) Eugenie Bouchard (qualifying competition)
4. (Japan) Yurika Sema (first round, retired)
5. (China) Wang Qiang (first round)
6. (Japan) Junri Namigata (second round)
7. (Thailand) Luksika Kumkhum (qualified)
8. (Thailand) Nudnida Luangnam (qualified)

=== Qualifiers ===
1. (Thailand) Nudnida Luangnam
2. (Russia) Olga Puchkova
3. (Thailand) Luksika Kumkhum
4. (China) Zhou Yimiao

=== Draw ===
==== First qualifier ====
First round
1	(Sweden) Johanna Larsson	6	6
(Thailand) Varatchaya Wongteanchai	4	4
(Japan) Rika Fujiwara	5	2
(Japan) Miharu Imanishi	7	6
WC	(United Kingdom) Robyn Beddow	2	0
(Russia) Ksenia Lykina	6	6
WC	(Japan) Yoshimi Kawasaki	0	0
8	(Thailand) Nudnida Luangnam	6	6

Second round
1	(Sweden) Johanna Larsson	1	7^{8}	6
(Japan) Miharu Imanishi	6	6^{6}	0
(Russia) Ksenia Lykina	3	4
8	(Thailand) Nudnida Luangnam	6	6

Qualifying competition
1	(Sweden) Johanna Larsson	4	3
8	(Thailand) Nudnida Luangnam	6	6

==== Second qualifier ====
First round
2	(Russia) Olga Puchkova	6	6
(Kazakhstan) Zarina Diyas	1	4
WC	(Japan) Chihiro Takayama	2	0
(Japan) Miki Miyamura	6	6
(Japan) Kazusa Ito	4	3
(Thailand) Noppawan Lertcheewakarn	6	6
(Japan) Aki Yamasoto	4	6	6
5	(China) Wang Qiang	6	3	4

Second round
2	(Russia) Olga Puchkova	6	6
(Japan) Miki Miyamura	3	1
(Thailand) Noppawan Lertcheewakarn	3	1
(Japan) Aki Yamasoto	6	6

Qualifying competition
2	(Russia) Olga Puchkova	6	6
(Japan) Aki Yamasoto	2	4

==== Third qualifier ====
First round
3	(Canada) Eugenie Bouchard	2	6	6
(Japan) Eri Hozumi	6	4	4
(United States) Alexandra Stevenson	1	3
(Russia) Daria Gavrilova	6	6
WC	(Japan) Miyu Kato	6^{3}	3
(Hungary) Katalin Marosi	7^{7}	6
(Japan) Misa Eguchi	3	4
7	(Thailand) Luksika Kumkhum	6	6

Second round
3	(Canada) Eugenie Bouchard	4	6	6
(Russia) Daria Gavrilova	6	1	4
(Hungary) Katalin Marosi	6	1	2
7	(Thailand) Luksika Kumkhum	4	6	6

Qualifying competition
3	(Canada) Eugenie Bouchard	1	2
7	(Thailand) Luksika Kumkhum	6	6

==== Fourth qualifier ====
First round
4	(Japan) Yurika Sema	6	3	2^{r}
WC	(Japan) Risa Ozaki	2	6	3
(Japan) Shuko Aoyama	6	6
WC	(Croatia) Darija Jurak	2	2
(China) Zhou Yimiao	7^{10}	6
WC	(Japan) Riko Sawayanagi	6^{8}	2
(Japan) Erika Takao	2	5
6	(Japan) Junri Namigata	6	7

Second round
WC	(Japan) Risa Ozaki	3	6	2
(Japan) Shuko Aoyama	6	0	6
(China) Zhou Yimiao	6	7^{7}
6	(Japan) Junri Namigata	2	6^{1}

Qualifying competition
(Japan) Shuko Aoyama	2	3
(China) Zhou Yimiao	6	6
