= 2010 Moorilla Hobart International =

- Date: 10–16 January
- Edition: 17th
- Category: WTA International
- Draw: 32S / 16D
- Prize money: $220,000
- Surface: Hard / outdoor
- Location: Hobart, Australia

Champions

Singles
- (Ukraine) Alona Bondarenko

Doubles
- (Chinese Taipei) Chuang Chia-jung / (Czech Republic) Květa Peschke
← 2009 ·	Moorilla Hobart International	· 2011 →

The 2010 Moorilla Hobart International was a men's tennis tournament played on outdoor hard courts. It was the 17th edition of the event and is part of the WTA International tournaments of the 2010 WTA Tour. It took place at the Hobart International Tennis Centre in Hobart, Australia from 10 January through 16 January 2010. Fourth-seeded Alona Bondarenko won the singles title.

== Finals ==
=== Singles ===
(Ukraine) Alona Bondarenko defeated (Israel) Shahar Pe'er, 6–2, 6–4.

- It was Bondarenko's first title of the year and second of her career.

=== Doubles ===
(Chinese Taipei) Chuang Chia-jung / (Czech Republic) Květa Peschke defeated (Chinese Taipei) Chan Yung-jan / (Romania) Monica Niculescu, 3–6, 6–3, 10–7.

== WTA entrants ==
=== Seeds ===
Country	Player	Rank^{1}	Seed
ESP	Anabel Medina Garrigues	27	1
ISR	Shahar Pe'er	30	2
UKR	Kateryna Bondarenko	31	3
UKR	Alona Bondarenko	32	4
ESP	Carla Suárez Navarro	33	5
CAN	Aleksandra Wozniak	34	6
CHN	Zheng Jie	35	7
ARG	Gisela Dulko	36	8

- as of 4 January 2010

=== Other entrants ===
The following players received wildcards into the singles main draw:

- (Australia) Sophie Ferguson
- (Australia) Alicia Molik
- (Australia) Olivia Rogowska

The following players received entry into the singles main draw through qualifying:

- (United Kingdom) Elena Baltacha
- (Belgium) Kirsten Flipkens
- (Russia) Alla Kudryavtseva
- (Italy) Roberta Vinci
