= 2010 Moorilla Hobart International – Doubles =

Doubles
- 2010 Moorilla Hobart International

Final
- Champions: (Chinese Taipei) Chuang Chia-jung (Czech Republic) Květa Peschke
- Runners-up: (Chinese Taipei) Chan Yung-jan (Romania) Monica Niculescu
- Score: 3–6, 6–3, 10–7

Events
Singles	Doubles
← 2009 ·	Moorilla Hobart International	· 2011 →

Gisela Dulko and Flavia Pennetta were the defending champions, but Pennetta chose not to compete.
Dulko partnered with Zheng Jie, but lost in the quarterfinals to Chan Yung-jan and Monica Niculescu.

Chuang Chia-jung and Květa Peschke won in the final, 3–6, 6–3, 10–7, against Chan and Niculescu.

== Seeds ==
1. (Chinese Taipei) Hsieh Su-wei / (China) Peng Shuai (semifinals)
2. (India) Sania Mirza / (Spain) Virginia Ruano Pascual (quarterfinals)
3. (Argentina) Gisela Dulko / (China) Zheng Jie (quarterfinals)
4. (Russia) Alla Kudryavtseva / (Russia) Ekaterina Makarova (first round)

== Draw ==
=== Key ===
- Q = Qualifier
- WC = Wild card
- LL = Lucky loser
- Alt = Alternate
- SE = Special exempt
- PR = Protected ranking
- ITF = ITF entry
- JE = Junior exempt
- w/o = Walkover
- r = Retired
- d = Defaulted
- SR = Special ranking

First round
1	(Chinese Taipei) S-w Hsieh (China) S Peng	6	5	[10]
(Ukraine) A Bondarenko (Ukraine) K Bondarenko	2	7	[3]
(South Africa) N Grandin (Germany) J Wöhr	4	6	[5]
(Spain) A Medina Garrigues (Slovakia) M Rybáriková	6	2	[10]
3	(Argentina) G Dulko (China) J Zheng	6	6
(Latvia) L Dekmeijere (Turkey) İ Şenoğlu	2	3
WC	(Australia) J Dokić (Australia) A Molik	6^{4}	7	2
(Chinese Taipei) Y-j Chan (Romania) M Niculescu	7	6^{5}	[10]
(Czech Republic) I Benešová (Czech Republic) L Hradecká	6	6
(Russia) M Kondratieva (France) S Lefèvre	3	2
(Chinese Taipei) C-j Chuang (Czech Republic) K Peschke	6	6
4	(Russia) A Kudryavtseva (Russia) E Makarova	4	3
(Italy) S Errani (Italy) R Vinci	2	6	[10]
(Belarus) O Govortsova (Belarus) T Poutchek	6	3	[4]
(Romania) E Gallovits (Canada) M-È Pelletier	2	1
2	(India) S Mirza (Spain) V Ruano Pascual	6	6

Quarterfinals
1	(Chinese Taipei) S-w Hsieh (China) S Peng	5	6	[10]
(Spain) A Medina Garrigues (Slovakia) M Rybáriková	7	3	[8]
3	(Argentina) G Dulko (China) J Zheng	3	4
(Chinese Taipei) Y-j Chan (Romania) M Niculescu	6	6
(Czech Republic) I Benešová (Czech Republic) L Hradecká	6^{5}	3
(Chinese Taipei) C-j Chuang (Czech Republic) K Peschke	7	6
(Italy) S Errani (Italy) R Vinci	6	7
2	(India) S Mirza (Spain) V Ruano Pascual	3	5

Semifinals
1	(Chinese Taipei) S-w Hsieh (China) S Peng	6^{5}	6	[8]
(Chinese Taipei) Y-j Chan (Romania) M Niculescu	7	4	[10]
(Chinese Taipei) C-j Chuang (Czech Republic) K Peschke	6	6
(Italy) S Errani (Italy) R Vinci	3	2

Finals
(Chinese Taipei) Y-j Chan (Romania) M Niculescu	6	3	[7]
(Chinese Taipei) C-j Chuang (Czech Republic) K Peschke	3	6	[10]
