= 2007 Serena Williams tennis season =

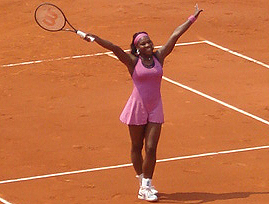
- Serena Williams at the French Open
- Full name: Serena Jameka Williams
- Country: United States
- Calendar prize money: $2,102,642

Singles
- Season record: 35–10 (78%)
- Calendar titles: 2
- Year-end ranking: 7
- Ranking change from previous year: ▲88

Grand Slam & significant results
- Australian Open: W
- French Open: QF
- Wimbledon: QF
- US Open: QF
- Championships: RR

Doubles
- Season record: 1-0 (100%)

Grand Slam doubles results
- Wimbledon: 2R

Serena Williams's 2007 tennis season officially began at the Moorilla Hobart International. Williams finished the year ranked world no. 7, finishing in the top 10 and reaching the quarterfinals of all slams for the first time in two years. She also won her 8th slam at the Australian Open.

== Year in detail ==
Williams began 2007 with renewed confidence, stating her intention to return to the top of the rankings, a comment former player and commentator Pat Cash branded "deluded."

=== Australian Open and early hard court season ===
==== Moorilla Hobart International ====
Williams began her 2007 season at the Moorilla Hobart International. In her opening match she faced Sofia Arvidsson of Sweden. Williams took the first five games just to see Arvidsson take four in a row; Williams then closed it out in the tenth game. The second set was dominated by Williams with a bagel. Williams then scrapped past Lucie Šafářová in her next match, when they traded the first two sets, Williams winning the first and Šafářová taking the second. Williams took the third set in a tie-break. In the quarterfinals she took on Sybille Bammer. Williams took the first set but was eliminated by Bammer, when Bammer took the last twos sets.

==== Australian Open ====
Williams came into the Australian Open unseeded, because of her world no. 81 ranking and was widely regarded as "out of shape". Williams in her opening match faced 27th seed Mara Santangelo and lost only three games, with the help of ten aces. In her next match she faced qualifier Anne Kremer, which she had to break back when she was broken in the fifth game to push it to a tie-break. Kramer took four of the first five points, before Williams could win the last six to take the breaker. Williams then took the first four games of the second and eventually closed it out in the eight game. In the round of 32, Williams had 5th seed Nadia Petrova on the other side of the net. Petrova dominated the first set losing only a game and served for the match in the tenth game of the second. However, Williams broke back and won the next two games to take the second set when Petrova double faulted. Williams then took the deciding set with a single break lead, serving it out in the ninth game. This was her first win over a top-10 player since defeating Lindsay Davenport in the 2005 Australian Open final. In the fourth round, she faced 11th ranked Jelena Janković and cruised in straight sets with a drop of only five games. Williams fired eight aces to go with 31 winners and 28 errors. This is her first time since the 2005 Australian Open to get past the fourth round of a slam. In the last eight, she took on Shahar Pe'er. Pe'er broke in the first game and held the led through closing it out in the ninth game. Williams then took the last four games of the second set form the fifth game to take it to a decider. Williams broke in the fourth game, just for Pe'er to break back and get back on serve latter in the set. Pe'er then broke in the eleventh game and served for the match; Williams then broke back and won the next two games to go through. Williams had 49 unforced errors and only 30 winners. In the final 4, Williams faced 17-year-old Nicole Vaidišová. The first went to a tie-break in which Williams took the first four points then Vaidišová rallied to tie it at 5, Williams then took the next two points to take the set. Williams then broke Vaidišová twice and served for the match at the eight game, Vaidišová came back and broke and saved four match points on her own serve to hold. Williams then served it out in the tenth game. Tracy Austin in her tournament analysis stated that Williams had a great tournament but the ride was over and that Maria Sharapova would have no trouble with Williams. Serena thought it was mean and unnecessary and used it as motivation. In the first set, Williams took the first five games before Sharapova could get a game, Williams then held to close out the set. Williams then made four games in a row in the second before Sharapova could win a game, Williams served it out in the eight game and won the match. This is her first title at any tournament since winning the 2005 Australian Open. Williams finished with 28 winners and 11 unforced errors. Williams came the first player since Chris O'Neil to win the title whilst not being seeded; and claimed her third Australian Open and eighth Grand Slam singles title overall. The win elevated Williams to 14th in the rankings. Williams dedicated the title to her deceased sister Yetunde Price. Her performance in the final was described in the press as "one of the best performances of her career" and "arguably the most powerful display ever seen in women's tennis."

==== Sony Ericsson Open ====
Following her first title in 2 years, Williams then played at the Sony Ericsson Open as the 13th seed. Due to being seeded Williams received a bye into the second round. She opened her campaign against Russia's Anastasia Rodionova and won in straight sets, winning both in three. In her next match, she played Lucie Šafářová and also won against the Czech with a drop of only seven games. In a rematch of the 2007 Australian Open final, she took on top seed Maria Sharapova and the results was the same as she demolished her higher ranked opponent with a double breadstick win in just 58 minutes. In the quarterfinals, she defeated 8th seed Nicole Vaidišová, but unlike their Australian Open match earlier in the year, this win as a much easier one, as Williams only dropped five games. In the final 4, Williams took on Shahar Pe'er. The first set was a close one as they head to a tie-break, which Williams won, the second set was proven to be more easy as Williams won in a breadstick. In the final, Williams faced world no. 1 Justine Henin. Henin came out strong winning the first seven games, and winning the first set in a bagel in the process, before Williams could get a game. The two then exchanged breaks latter in the set as Henin served for the match in tenth game, in which Williams saved and broke the Belgian. Williams then held at love and broke again to take the set. In the deciding set, Williams took the first three games, before Henin could get two herself to get back on serve. Williams then broke and served for the match in the ninth game, but fell behind 3 break points and saved them all and was able to serve it out for her fourth Miami title.

=== Clay Season and the French Open ===
==== Family Circle Cup ====
Williams began her clay season at the green clay of the Family Circle Cup. She received a bye in the first round, but retired from her second round match against Chan Yung-Jan, while down 3–5.

==== Internazionali BNL d'Italia ====
In her preparation for the French Open, Williams played at the Internazionali BNL d'Italia. As the 8th seed, Williams got a bye in the first round. In her opening match she faced Lucky Loser Michaëlla Krajicek and won with ease in straight sets dropping only five games despite receiving treatment for her left thigh after the first set. In the third round, she faced Shahar Pe'er for the third time in the year, and came through in straight sets, winning both sets in three. In her quarterfinal match, she faced Patty Schnyder. Schnyder took the first set and took the first two games of the second, when Williams came back winning the next six games to win the second set. The third set went to a tie-break, which Schnyder won. After the tournament, she re-entered the top 10 at world no. 9.

==== French Open ====
"All she had to do was show up. I don't think I've ever played so bad in the quarters of a grand slam", said Williams. "I'm always saying I want to peak at the right time but I didn't have any peaks today. I've never played so hideous and horrendous. I just stood back and let her take advantage of me. I was just making all the errors and playing like a maniac."

— Williams after her match against Henin.

Williams then came into the second slam of the year the French Open as the eighth seed, it is her first French Open in three years. Williams opened her campaign against Bulgarian Tsvetana Pironkova, Pironkova served for the first set in the eight game, Williams came back to take the next three games. However, Pironkova broke and play was suspended. When they came back Pironkova served it out in the twelfth game and took the first game. Williams came back winning 12 of the last 13 games to take the match. In her next match, she took on Milagros Sequera and won the first set in a bagel. In the second set, Suquera won the first three games of the second set, Williams came back to push it to a tie-break, which Williams won to advance. In the third round, Williams faced Michaëlla Krajicek, Williams won the first three games, then Krajicek won the next three, just to see Williams take the next three to win the set. Williams then won the second set with a single break lead. In the round of 16, Williams took the first four games of the first set but eventually closed the set in the eight game. Williams broke in the ninth game to advance. In the quarterfinals, Williams faced world no. 1 Justine Henin, Henin broke in the first game and held it through to take the first set. Henin then took the match when she broke Williams in the ninth game of the second.

=== Wimbledon ===
Williams then played at Wimbledon after missing last year's edition. She open her tournament against Spaniard Lourdes Domínguez Lino in the first round. Williams was pushed in the first set but was able to close it out in the twelfth game, she then rolled through the second set, winning it in a bagel. In her second round match, she faced Alicia Molik, Molik took four of the first five games but Williams came back to push it to a tie-break, which Williams won. Williams then closed out the second set with a break lead. Williams finished with 10 aces and 35 winners to 18 errors. Williams in the next match then took on Milagros Sequera and won very convincingly dropping only a game in the match. In the fourth round match, Williams faced Daniela Hantuchová. Williams won the first set easily with a double break lead. Hantuchová came back and served for the set, but Williams came back to push it to a tie-break despite Williams collapsing from an acute muscle spasm at 5–5 and having a medical timeout. Hantuchová then won the tie-break before rain forced play to be suspended for nearly two hours. When the players returned, Williams took the last four games from the fifth game to win the match. In the quarterfinals, Williams faced world no. 1 Justine Henin. Henin won the first set, just to see Williams comeback to win the second set. Henin then served for the match in the seventh game but Williams came back, however it wasn't enough as Henin served out the match in the ninth game to advance. Williams was suffering from the injuries sustained in the previous round. Williams who claimed she played at 40% was criticized by Michael Stich for claiming after the match that she would have beaten Henin had she been healthy.

She played with sister Venus Williams and defeated the British wild card team of Claire Curran and Anne Keothavong in straight sets, but withdrew before their match against Anabel Medina Garrigues and Virginia Ruano Pascual.

=== US Open ===
After Wimbledon, Williams did not play any tournaments before the US Open due to the injuries sustained. Williams was vying for her third US Open. In her opening match, she took on German Angelique Kerber. Williams took the first set in the ninth game. In the second set Kerber came back and served for it in the tenth game, however, Williams came back on won the last three games to win in straight sets. In her next match, she took on Italian Maria Elena Camerin, Camerin took four of the first five games, just to see Williams take 12 of the last 15 to come through in straight sets. In the round of 32, Williams came up against Vera Zvonareva, Williams took the first set with a single break lead. In the second set, Williams was pushed to a tie-break, in which she won six of the first seven points, to set up 5 match points, in which she converted on her fourth. In the fourth round, Williams faced Marion Bartoli, Bartoli took the first two games, however Williams came back winning six of the next seven games to take the set. Williams then served out the second set with single break lead in the tenth game. In the quarterfinals, she once again faced Justine Henin for the third straight time. Henin served for the first set in the tenth and twelfth game, but Williams broke her to go to a tie-break, which Henin prevailed in. The second set was one-sided with Henin winning it with a breadstick. It is her third consecutive Grand Slam singles quarterfinal loss to Henin.

=== Indoor Season and Year-End Championships ===
==== Porsche Tennis Grand Prix ====
Williams began her campaign in securing her spot in the Year-End Championships at the Porsche Tennis Grand Prix. She first took on Zuzana Ondrášková and cruised with a double bagel win over the Czech. In her second match, she faced Julia Vakulenko. Williams won four of the first five games but Vakulenko broke back in the seventh game, serving to stay in the set Vakulenko was broken by Williams. Williams then rallied to win the second set dropping only two games. However, in the quarterfinals Williams lost to world no. 2 Svetlana Kuznetsova in straight sets with the Russian winning both sets in three.

==== Kremlin Cup ====
Williams next scheduled event was the Kremlin Cup. Being the fourth seed, Williams received a bye into the second round, where she faced Ukraine's Tatiana Perebiynis, the two traded breaks three times in the first set until Williams broke in the twelfth game to take the set. Williams broke Perebiynis in the second game, just to see Perebiynis break back. Perebiynis serving to stay in the match in the tenth games saved three match points, but Williams converted on her fourth to advance. In the quarterfinals, Williams faced Nicole Vaidišová. Williams won the first set with a break lead. Vaidišová broke in eight game and served for the set, but Williams broke and saved a set point in the twelfth game to force a tie-break, which Williams took in her fourth match point. In the final 4, Williams faced world no. 2 Svetlana Kuznetsova for the second week in a row. The first set went to a tie-break, which Williams won. In the second set Williams dominated winning it in a tie-break. In her first final since Miami and her third of the year, Williams faced Russian Elena Dementieva. Williams served for the set at the tenth game but failed to so. However, she was able to close it out in the second offering in the twelfth game. However, Dementieva came back winning the next to two sets with a double breadstick to earn her first win over Williams in five meetings.

==== Zürich Open ====
"Normally she needs a rest after two weeks of tournaments", Schnyder said. "But I like that she came here and tried."

— Schnyder after her match with Williams

Williams then made her final stop before the year-end championships at the Zürich Open and faced Patty Schnyder. However, after Schnyder took the first nine games of the match, Williams retired sore right thigh injury.

==== WTA Tour Championships ====
Williams qualified for the WTA Tour Championships in Madrid and was placed in the yellow group along with Justine Henin, Jelena Janković, and Anna Chakvetadze. In her first round robin match, she faced Anna Chakvetadze and retired after losing the first set with a knee injury and subsequently withdrew from the tournament.

=== Fed Cup ===
Williams played for her country in the Fed Cup for the first time since 2003 in a tie against Belgium. Williams player her opening match against Caroline Maes. Williams took a commanding lead in the first set taking the first five games before Maes could get a game and eventually closed the set out in the next game. Williams then won the second set with a single break lead. Williams withdrew from her second due to a knee injury.

== All matches ==
=== Singles matches ===
Tournament	Match	Round	Opponent	Rank	Result	Score
Moorilla Hobart International; Hobart, Australia; Tier IV; Hard, outdoor 8–14 January 2007	388	1R	(Sweden) Sofia Arvidsson	#60	Win	6–4, 6–0
Moorilla Hobart International; Hobart, Australia; Tier IV; Hard, outdoor 8–14 January 2007	389	2R	(Czech Republic) Lucie Šafářová	#74	Win	6–3, 3–6, 7–6^{(7–5)}
Moorilla Hobart International; Hobart, Australia; Tier IV; Hard, outdoor 8–14 January 2007	390	QF	(Austria) Sybille Bammer	#56	Loss	6–3, 5–7, 3–6
Australian Open; Melbourne, Australia; Grand Slam; Hard, outdoor 15–28 January 2007	391	1R	(Italy) Mara Santangelo	#32	Win	6–2, 6–1
Australian Open; Melbourne, Australia; Grand Slam; Hard, outdoor 15–28 January 2007	392	2R	(Luxembourg) Anne Kremer	#159	Win	7–6^{(7–4)}, 6–2
Australian Open; Melbourne, Australia; Grand Slam; Hard, outdoor 15–28 January 2007	393	3R	(Russia) Nadia Petrova	#6	Win	1–6, 7–5, 6–3
Australian Open; Melbourne, Australia; Grand Slam; Hard, outdoor 15–28 January 2007	394	4R	(Serbia) Jelena Janković	#11	Win	6–3, 6–2
Australian Open; Melbourne, Australia; Grand Slam; Hard, outdoor 15–28 January 2007	395	QF	(Israel) Shahar Pe'er	#17	Win	3–6, 6–2, 8–6
Australian Open; Melbourne, Australia; Grand Slam; Hard, outdoor 15–28 January 2007	396	SF	(Czech Republic) Nicole Vaidišová	#12	Win	7–6^{(7-5)}, 6–4
Australian Open; Melbourne, Australia; Grand Slam; Hard, outdoor 15–28 January 2007	397	F	(Russia) Maria Sharapova	#2	Win	6–1, 6–2
Sony Ericsson Open; Key Biscayne, Miami, USA; WTA Tier I Hard; 19 March - 1 April 2007	–	1R	Bye			
Sony Ericsson Open; Key Biscayne, Miami, USA; WTA Tier I Hard; 19 March - 1 April 2007	398	2R	(Russia) Anastasia Rodionova	#82	Win	6–3, 6–3
Sony Ericsson Open; Key Biscayne, Miami, USA; WTA Tier I Hard; 19 March - 1 April 2007	399	3R	(Czech Republic) Lucie Šafářová	#26	Win	6–3, 6–4
Sony Ericsson Open; Key Biscayne, Miami, USA; WTA Tier I Hard; 19 March - 1 April 2007	400	4R	(Russia) Maria Sharapova	#2	Win	6–1, 6–1
Sony Ericsson Open; Key Biscayne, Miami, USA; WTA Tier I Hard; 19 March - 1 April 2007	401	QF	(Czech Republic) Nicole Vaidišová	#8	Win	6–1, 6–4
Sony Ericsson Open; Key Biscayne, Miami, USA; WTA Tier I Hard; 19 March - 1 April 2007	402	SF	(Israel) Shahar Pe'er	#16	Win	7–6^{(7–4)}, 6–1
Sony Ericsson Open; Key Biscayne, Miami, USA; WTA Tier I Hard; 19 March - 1 April 2007	403	F	(Belgium) Justine Henin	#1	Win	0–6, 7–5, 6–3
Family Circle Cup; Charleston, USA; WTA Tier I Clay, Green; 9–15 April 2007	–	1R	Bye			
Family Circle Cup; Charleston, USA; WTA Tier I Clay, Green; 9–15 April 2007	404	2R	(Chinese Taipei) Chan Yung-Jan	#92	Loss	3–5, Ret
Fed Cup WG: United States vs. Belgium; Delray Beach, Florida, United States; Fed Cup; Hard, outdoors February 21–22, 2012	405	–	(Belgium) Caroline Maes	#227	Win	6–1, 6–4
Internazionali BNL d'Italia; Rome, Italy; WTA Tier I Clay, Red; 14–20 May 2007	–	1R	Bye			
Internazionali BNL d'Italia; Rome, Italy; WTA Tier I Clay, Red; 14–20 May 2007	406	2R	(Netherlands) Michaëlla Krajicek	#39	Win	6–4, 6–1
Internazionali BNL d'Italia; Rome, Italy; WTA Tier I Clay, Red; 14–20 May 2007	407	3R	(Israel) Shahar Pe'er	#15	Win	6–3, 6–3
Internazionali BNL d'Italia; Rome, Italy; WTA Tier I Clay, Red; 14–20 May 2007	408	QF	(Switzerland) Patty Schnyder	#34	Loss	3–6, 6–2, 6–7^{(5–7)}
French Open; Paris, France; Grand Slam; Clay, Red; 27 May - 9 June 2007	409	1R	(Bulgaria) Tsvetana Pironkova	#91	Win	5–7, 6–1, 6–1
French Open; Paris, France; Grand Slam; Clay, Red; 27 May - 9 June 2007	410	2R	(Venezuela) Milagros Sequera	#69	Win	6–0, 7–5^{(7–3)}
French Open; Paris, France; Grand Slam; Clay, Red; 27 May - 9 June 2007	411	3R	(Netherlands) Michaëlla Krajicek	#40	Win	6–3, 6–4
French Open; Paris, France; Grand Slam; Clay, Red; 27 May - 9 June 2007	412	4R	(Russia) Dinara Safina	#11	Win	6–2, 6–3
French Open; Paris, France; Grand Slam; Clay, Red; 27 May - 9 June 2007	413	QF	(Belgium) Justine Henin	#1	Loss	4–6, 3–6
Wimbledon; London, United Kingdom; Grand Slam; Grass; 25 June - 8 July 2007	414	1R	(Spain) Lourdes Domínguez Lino	#57	Win	7–5, 6–0
Wimbledon; London, United Kingdom; Grand Slam; Grass; 25 June - 8 July 2007	415	2R	(Australia) Alicia Molik	#75	Win	7–6^{(7–4)}, 6–3
Wimbledon; London, United Kingdom; Grand Slam; Grass; 25 June - 8 July 2007	416	3R	(Venezuela) Milagros Sequera	#56	Win	6–1, 6–0
Wimbledon; London, United Kingdom; Grand Slam; Grass; 25 June - 8 July 2007	417	4R	(Slovakia) Daniela Hantuchová	#12	Win	6–2, 6–7^{(9–7)}, 6–2
Wimbledon; London, United Kingdom; Grand Slam; Grass; 25 June - 8 July 2007	418	QF	(Belgium) Justine Henin	#1	Loss	4–6, 6–3, 3–6
US Open; New York City, United States; Grand Slam; Hard, outdoor 27 August - 9 September 2007	419	1R	(Germany) Angelique Kerber	#67	Win	6–3, 7–5
US Open; New York City, United States; Grand Slam; Hard, outdoor 27 August - 9 September 2007	420	2R	(Italy) Maria Elena Camerin	#76	Win	7–5, 6–2
US Open; New York City, United States; Grand Slam; Hard, outdoor 27 August - 9 September 2007	421	3R	(Russia) Vera Zvonareva	#28	Win	6–4, 7–6^{(7–4)}
US Open; New York City, United States; Grand Slam; Hard, outdoor 27 August - 9 September 2007	422	4R	(France) Marion Bartoli	#10	Win	6–3, 6–4
US Open; New York City, United States; Grand Slam; Hard, outdoor 27 August - 9 September 2007	423	QF	(Belgium) Justine Henin	#1	Loss	6–7^{(3–7)}, 1–6
Porsche Tennis Grand Prix; Stuttgart, Germany; WTA Tier II; Hard, indoors 1–7 October 2007	424	1R	(Czech Republic) Zuzana Ondrášková	#140	Win	6–0, 6–0
Porsche Tennis Grand Prix; Stuttgart, Germany; WTA Tier II; Hard, indoors 1–7 October 2007	425	2R	(Ukraine) Julia Vakulenko	#41	Win	7–5, 6–2
Porsche Tennis Grand Prix; Stuttgart, Germany; WTA Tier II; Hard, indoors 1–7 October 2007	426	QF	(Russia) Svetlana Kuznetsova	#2	Loss	3–6, 3–6
Kremlin Cup; Moscow, Russia; WTA Tier I Hard, indoors 8–14 October 2007	–	1R	Bye			
Kremlin Cup; Moscow, Russia; WTA Tier I Hard, indoors 8–14 October 2007	427	2R	(Ukraine) Tatiana Perebiynis	#130	Win	7–5, 6–4
Kremlin Cup; Moscow, Russia; WTA Tier I Hard, indoors 8–14 October 2007	428	QF	(Czech Republic) Nicole Vaidišová	#13	Win	6–4, 7–6^{(9–7)}
Kremlin Cup; Moscow, Russia; WTA Tier I Hard, indoors 8–14 October 2007	429	SF	(Russia) Svetlana Kuznetsova	#2	Win	7–6^{(7–2)}, 6–1
Kremlin Cup; Moscow, Russia; WTA Tier I Hard, indoors 8–14 October 2007	430	F	(Russia) Elena Dementieva	#14	Loss	7–5, 1–6, 1–6
Zürich Open; Zürich, Switzerland; WTA Tier I Hard, indoors 15–21 October 2007	431	1R	(Switzerland) Patty Schnyder	#17	Loss	0–6, 0–3 Ret
WTA Tour Championships; Madrid, Spain; Year-End Championship; Hard; 6–12 November 2007	432	RR	(Russia) Anna Chakvetadze	#7	Loss	4–6, Ret

=== Doubles matches ===
Tournament	Match	Round	Partner	Opponents	Rank	Result	Score
Wimbledon; London, United Kingdom; Grand Slam; Grass; 21 June - 4 July 2007	110	1R	(United States) Venus Williams	(United Kingdom) Claire Curran (United Kingdom) Anne Keothavong	#412 #258	Win	6–1, 6–3
Wimbledon; London, United Kingdom; Grand Slam; Grass; 21 June - 4 July 2007	–	2R	(United States) Venus Williams	(Spain) Anabel Medina Garrigues (Spain) Virginia Ruano Pascual	#30 #14	Withdrew	N/A

== Tournament schedule ==
=== Singles schedule ===
Williams' 2007 singles tournament schedule is as follows:

Date	Championship	Location	Category	Surface	Points	Outcome
8 January 2007 – 14 January 2007	Moorilla Hobart International	Hobart (AUS)	WTA Tier IV	Hard	30	Quarterfinals lost to Sybille Bammer, 6–3, 5–7, 3–6
15 January 2007 – 28 January 2007	Australian Open	Melbourne (AUS)	Grand Slam	Hard	1000	Winner defeated Maria Sharapova, 6–1, 6–2
19 March 2007 – 1 April 2007	Sony Ericsson Open	Miami (USA)	WTA Tier I	Hard	500	Winner defeated Justine Henin, 0–6, 7–5, 6–3
9 April 2007 – 15 April 2007	Family Circle Cup	Charleston (USA)	WTA Tier I	Clay (green)	1	Second round lost to Chan Yung-Jan, 3–5 Ret
4 February 2007– 5 February 2007	Fed Cup WG First Round: United States vs. Belgium	Delray Beach (USA)	Fed Cup	Hard		United States def. Belgium, 5–0; United States Advanced to Quarterfinals
14 May 2007 – 20 May 2007	Internazionali BNL d'Italia	Rome (ITA)	WTA Tier I	Clay, Red	110	Quarterfinals lost to Patty Schnyder 3–6, 6–2, 6–7^{(5–7)}
27 May 2007 – 9 June 2007	French Open	Paris (FRA)	Grand Slam	Clay	250	Quarterfinals lost to Justine Henin, 4–6, 3–6
25 June 2007 – 8 July 2007	The Championships, Wimbledon	Wimbledon (GBR)	Grand Slam	Grass	250	Quarterfinals lost to Justine Henin, 4–6, 6–3, 3–6
27 August 2007 – 9 September 2007	US Open	New York (USA)	Grand Slam	Hard	250	Quarterfinals lost to Justine Henin,6–7^{(3–7)}, 1–6
1 October 2007 – 7 October 2007	Porsche Tennis Grand Prix	Stuttgart (GER)	WTA Tier I	Hard (i)	75	Quarterfinals lost to Svetlana Kuznetsova, 3–6, 3–6
8 October 2007 – 14 October 2007	Kremlin Cup	Moscow (RUS)	WTA Tier I	Hard (i)	300	Final lost to Elena Dementieva 7–5, 1–6, 1–6
15 October 2007 – 21 October 2007	Zürich Open	Zürich (SUI)	WTA Tier I	Hard (i)	1	First Round lost to Patty Schnyder 0–6, 0–3 Ret
6 November 2007 – 12 November 2007	WTA Tour Championships	Madrid (ESP)	Year End Championships	Hard (i)	35	Round robin withdrew due to a knee injury
Total year-end points					2802	

=== Doubles schedule ===
Williams' 2007 doubles tournament schedule is as follows:

Date	Championship	Location	Category	Partner	Surface	Points	Outcome
25 June 2007 – 8 July 2007	The Championships, Wimbledon	Wimbledon (GBR)	Grand Slam	(United States) Venus Williams	Grass	90	Second Round Withdrew before match against Medina Garrigues/Ruano Pascual
Total year-end points						90	

== Yearly records ==
=== Head-to-head matchups ===
Ordered by percentage of wins

- (Czech Republic) Nicole Vaidišová 3–0
- (Israel) Shahar Pe'er 3–0
- (Russia) Maria Sharapova 2–0
- (Venezuela) Milagros Sequera 2–0
- (Czech Republic) Lucie Šafářová 2–0
- (Netherlands) Michaëlla Krajicek 2–0
- (Sweden) Sofia Arvidsson 1–0
- (Italy) Mara Santangelo 1–0
- (Luxembourg) Anne Kremer 1–0
- (Russia) Nadia Petrova 1–0
- (Russia) Vera Zvonareva 1–0
- (Serbia) Jelena Janković 1–0
- (Russia) Anastasia Rodionova 1–0
- (Belgium) Caroline Maes 1–0
- (Bulgaria) Tsvetana Pironkova 1–0
- (Russia) Dinara Safina 1–0
- (Spain) Lourdes Domínguez Lino 1–0
- (Australia) Alicia Molik 1–0
- (Slovakia) Daniela Hantuchová 1–0
- (Germany) Angelique Kerber 1–0
- (Italy) Maria Elena Camerin 1–0
- (France) Marion Bartoli 1–0
- (Czech Republic) Zuzana Ondrášková 1–0
- (Ukraine) Julia Vakulenko 1–0
- (Ukraine) Tatiana Perebiynis 1–0
- (Russia) Svetlana Kuznetsova 1–1
- (Belgium) Justine Henin 1–3
- (Russia) Elena Dementieva 0–1
- (Russia) Anna Chakvetadze 0–1
- (Chinese Taipei) Chan Yung-Jan 0–1
- (Austria) Sybille Bammer 0–1
- (Switzerland) Patty Schnyder 0–2

=== Finals ===
==== Singles: 3 (2–1) ====
Legend Grand Slam (1–0) WTA Tier I (1–1)	Finals by surface Hard (2–1)	Finals by venue Outdoors (2–0) Indoors (0–1)

Outcome	No.	Date	Championship	Surface	Opponent in the final	Score in the final
Winner	27.	January 27, 2007	Australian Open, Melbourne, Australia (3)	Hard	(Russia) Maria Sharapova	6–1, 6–2
Winner	28.	March 31, 2007	Miami, US (4)	Hard	(Belgium) Justine Henin	0–6, 7–5, 6–3
Runner-up	11.	October 14, 2007	Moscow, Russia (1)	Hard	(Russia) Elena Dementieva	7–5, 1–6, 1–6

=== Earnings ===
#	Event	Prize money	Year-to-date
1	Moorilla Hobart International	$3,715	$3,715
2	Australian Open	$941,473	$945,188
3	Sony Ericsson Open	$492,950	$1,438,138
4	Family Circle Cup	$6,265	$1,444,403
5	Internazionali BNL d'Italia	$24,075	$1,468,478
6	French Open	$157,470	$1,625,948
7	Wimbledon	$165,061	$1,791,009
7	Wimbledon (doubles)	$8,025	$1,799,034
8	US Open	$147,457	$1,946,491
9	Porsche Tennis Grand Prix	$14,230	$1,960,721
10	Kremlin Cup	$97,800	$2,058,521
11	Zürich Open	$8,120	$2,066,641
13	WTA Tour Championships	$33,333	$2,099,974
Bonus Pool		$2,668	$2,102,642
			$2,102,642

Figures in United States dollars (USD) unless noted.

== See also ==
- Venus Williams
- 2007 WTA Tour

Sporting positions
Preceded by Venus Williams; Angelique Kerber	World No. 1 First stint: July 8, 2002 – August 10, 2003; Last stint: April 24, 2017 – May 14, 2017	Succeeded by Kim Clijsters; Angelique Kerber
Preceded by Jennifer Capriati; Justine Henin; Petra Kvitová	Year-end World No. 1; 2002; 2008, 2009; 2012 – 2015	Succeeded by Justine Henin; Kim Clijsters; Angelique Kerber
Awards
Preceded by Jennifer Capriati; Jelena Janković; Petra Kvitová	ITF Women's Singles World Champion; 2002; 2009; 2012 – 2015	Succeeded by Justine Henin; Caroline Wozniacki; Angelique Kerber
Preceded by Martina Hingis & Anna Kournikova; Cara Black & Liezel Huber	WTA Doubles Team of the Year; 2000 (with Venus Williams); 2009 (with Venus Williams)	Succeeded by Lisa Raymond & Rennae Stubbs; Gisela Dulko & Flavia Pennetta
Preceded by Cara Black & Liezel Huber	ITF Women's Doubles World Champion; 2009 (with Venus Williams)	Succeeded by Gisela Dulko & Flavia Pennetta
