= 2008 Moorilla Hobart International – Doubles =

Doubles
- 2008 Moorilla Hobart International

Final
- Champions: (Spain) Anabel Medina Garrigues (Spain) Virginia Ruano Pascual
- Runners-up: (Greece) Eleni Daniilidou (Germany) Jasmin Wöhr
- Score: 6–2, 6–4

Events
Singles	Doubles
← 2007 ·	Moorilla Hobart International	· 2009 →

Elena Likhovtseva and Elena Vesnina were the defending champions, but Likhovtseva chose not to participate, and only Vesnina competed that year.
Vesnina partnered with Maria Kirilenko, but they were forced to withdraw before their first round match, due to a left knee injury for Kirilenko.

Anabel Medina Garrigues and Virginia Ruano Pascual won in the final 6–2, 6–4, against Eleni Daniilidou and Jasmin Wöhr.

== Seeds ==
1. (Slovakia) Janette Husárová / (United States) Vania King (first round)
2. (Spain) Anabel Medina Garrigues / (Spain) Virginia Ruano Pascual (champions)
3. (Russia) Maria Kirilenko / (Russia) Elena Vesnina (withdrew due to a left knee injury for Kirilenko)
4. (Czech Republic) Lucie Hradecká / (Czech Republic) Renata Voráčová (quarterfinals, withdrew due to a viral illness for Voráčová)

== Draw ==
=== Key ===
- Q = Qualifier
- WC = Wild card
- LL = Lucky loser
- Alt = Alternate
- SE = Special exempt
- PR = Protected ranking
- ITF = ITF entry
- JE = Junior exempt
- w/o = Walkover
- r = Retired
- d = Defaulted
- SR = Special ranking

=== Draw ===
First round
1	(Slovakia) J Husárová (United States) V King	6^{1}	5
(Spain) L Domínguez Lino (Spain) A Parra Santonja	7	7
WC	(Australia) C Dellacqua (Australia) J Moore	6	6
(Chinese Taipei) I-h Hwang (South Korea) Y-r Lee	4	0
ALT	(Luxembourg) A Kremer (France) P Parmentier	1	2
(Poland) A Radwańska (Russia) Y Shvedova	6	6
(China) C Ji (China) S Sun	4	3
(Greece) E Daniilidou (Germany) J Wöhr	6	6
(Belarus) O Govortsova (Russia) A Rodionova	4	2
(Italy) F Pennetta (Argentina) ME Salerni	6	6
(United States) A Harkleroad (Russia) A Kudryavtseva	0	7	[6]
4	(Czech Republic) L Hradecká (Czech Republic) R Voráčová	6	5	[10]
(Croatia) J Kostanić Tošić (Germany) M Müller	5	6^{4}
(France) S Brémond (Czech Republic) P Cetkovská	7	7
(Poland) K Jans (Poland) A Rosolska	2	3
2	(Spain) A Medina Garrigues (Spain) V Ruano Pascual	6	6

Quarterfinals
(Spain) L Domínguez Lino (Spain) A Parra Santonja	6	6
WC	(Australia) C Dellacqua (Australia) J Moore	4	2
(Poland) A Radwańska (Russia) Y Shvedova	6	6^{2}	[8]
(Greece) E Daniilidou (Germany) J Wöhr	3	7	[10]
(Italy) F Pennetta (Argentina) ME Salerni	w/o
4	(Czech Republic) L Hradecká (Czech Republic) R Voráčová
(France) S Brémond (Czech Republic) P Cetkovská	0	6	[7]
2	(Spain) A Medina Garrigues (Spain) V Ruano Pascual	6	2	[10]

Semifinals
(Spain) L Domínguez Lino (Spain) A Parra Santonja	1	2
(Greece) E Daniilidou (Germany) J Wöhr	6	6
(Italy) F Pennetta (Argentina) ME Salerni
2	(Spain) A Medina Garrigues (Spain) V Ruano Pascual	w/o

Final
(Greece) E Daniilidou (Germany) J Wöhr	2	4
2	(Spain) A Medina Garrigues (Spain) V Ruano Pascual	6	6
