= 2011 Moorilla Hobart International – Singles =

Singles
- 2011 Moorilla Hobart International

Final
- Champion: (Australia) Jarmila Groth
- Runner-up: (United States) Bethanie Mattek-Sands
- Score: 6–4, 6–3

Details
- Draw: 32
- Seeds: 8

Events
Singles	Doubles
← 2010 ·	Moorilla Hobart International	· 2012 →

Alona Bondarenko was the defending champion, but chose not to participate this year due to a wrist injury.
Sixth seed Jarmila Groth won in the final 6–4, 6–3, against Bethanie Mattek-Sands.

== Seeds ==
1. (France) Marion Bartoli (quarterfinals)
2. (Russia) Anastasia Pavlyuchenkova (first round, retired)
3. (Bulgaria) Tsvetana Pironkova (first round)
4. (Italy) Roberta Vinci (quarterfinals)
5. (Czech Republic) Klára Zakopalová (semifinals)
6. (Australia) Jarmila Groth (champion)
7. (Italy) Sara Errani (quarterfinals)
8. (Germany) Angelique Kerber (quarterfinals)

== Draw ==
=== Key ===
- Q = Qualifier
- WC = Wild card
- LL = Lucky loser
- Alt = Alternate
- ITF = ITF entry
- PR = Protected ranking
- SR = Special ranking
- SE = Special exempt
- JE = Junior exempt
- JR = Junior Accelerator Programme entrant
- CO = College Accelerator Programme entrant
- NG = Next Gen Accelerator Program entrant
- w/o = Walkover
- r = Retired
- d = Defaulted

=== Finals ===
Semifinals
5	(Czech Republic) Klára Zakopalová	3	2
6	(Australia) Jarmila Groth	6	6
(China) Peng Shuai	6	1	1
(United States) Bethanie Mattek-Sands	4	6	6

Final
6	(Australia) Jarmila Groth	6	6
(United States) Bethanie Mattek-Sands	4	3

=== Top half ===
First round
1	(France) M Bartoli	6	6
(Russia) D Safina	0	1
(Spain) A Parra Santonja	2	1
(Russia) E Vesnina	6	6
Q	(Italy) A Brianti	4	6	6
(Spain) C Suárez Navarro	6	3	4
(United States) M Oudin	3	6^{3}
5	(Czech Republic) K Zakopalová	6	7
4	(Italy) R Vinci	7	6
(Italy) R Oprandi	6^{0}	3
(Thailand) T Tanasugarn	3	3
(United Kingdom) E Baltacha	6	6
Q	(Austria) T Paszek	6	6
WC	(Australia) O Rogowska	1	3
(Sweden) J Larsson	1	3
6	(Australia) J Groth	6	6

Second round
1	(France) M Bartoli	6	6
(Russia) E Vesnina	4	1
Q	(Italy) A Brianti	6	4	2
5	(Czech Republic) K Zakopalová	1	6	6
4	(Italy) R Vinci	6	6
(United Kingdom) E Baltacha	3	4
Q	(Austria) T Paszek	4	6^{5}
6	(Australia) J Groth	6	7

Quarterfinals
1	(France) M Bartoli	4	2
5	(Czech Republic) K Zakopalová	6	6
4	(Italy) R Vinci	1	2
6	(Australia) J Groth	6	6

Semifinals
5	(Czech Republic) K Zakopalová	3	2
6	(Australia) J Groth	6	6

=== Bottom half ===
First round
7	(Italy) S Errani	7	6
(Russia) A Chakvetadze	6^{0}	3
WC	(Australia) A Molik	7	6
(Sweden) S Arvidsson	5	3
Q	(Belarus) O Govortsova	6	6
WC	(Australia) S Peers	4	2
(China) S Peng	2	6	6
3	(Bulgaria) T Pironkova	6	3	2
8	(Germany) A Kerber	7	7
(Japan) K Date-Krumm	5	6^{3}
(Russia) A Kudryavtseva	6	6
Q	(Slovakia) M Rybáriková	3	4
(Japan) A Morita	3	6	7
(Uzbekistan) A Amanmuradova	6	1	6^{3}
(United States) B Mattek-Sands	6	0
2	(Russia) A Pavlyuchenkova	2	0^{r}

Second round
7	(Italy) S Errani	6	6
WC	(Australia) A Molik	1	0
Q	(Belarus) O Govortsova	6	4	0
(China) S Peng	2	6	6
8	(Germany) A Kerber	6	6
(Russia) A Kudryavtseva	3	4
(Japan) A Morita	3	1
(United States) B Mattek-Sands	6	6

Quarterfinals
7	(Italy) S Errani	1	3
(China) S Peng	6	6
8	(Germany) A Kerber	4	4
(United States) B Mattek-Sands	6	6

Semifinals
(China) S Peng	6	1	1
(United States) B Mattek-Sands	4	6	6

== Qualifying ==
=== Seeds ===
1. (Belarus) Olga Govortsova (Qualifier)
2. (Romania) Simona Halep (qualifying competition)
3. (Austria) Tamira Paszek (Qualifier)
4. (China) Zhang Shuai (qualifying competition)
5. (Italy) Alberta Brianti (Qualifier)
6. (Ukraine) Kateryna Bondarenko (qualifying competition)
7. (Slovakia) Magdaléna Rybáriková (Qualifier)
8. (Spain) Laura Pous Tió (qualifying competition)

=== Qualifiers ===
1. (Belarus) Olga Govortsova
2. (Slovakia) Magdaléna Rybáriková
3. (Austria) Tamira Paszek
4. (Italy) Alberta Brianti

=== Draw ===
==== First qualifier ====
First round
1	(Belarus) Olga Govortsova	7	6^{4}	7
WC	(United States) Abigail Spears	6^{3}	7	6^{2}
(Luxembourg) Mandy Minella	6	1	7
WC	(Australia) Isabella Holland	4	6	6^{4}
(United States) Julia Cohen	6	6
(Belarus) Tatiana Poutchek	4	0
(Colombia) Mariana Duque Mariño	6^{4}	2
8	(Spain) Laura Pous Tió	7	6

Second round
1	(Belarus) Olga Govortsova	6	3	6
(Luxembourg) Mandy Minella	0	6	3
(United States) Julia Cohen	5	0
8	(Spain) Laura Pous Tió	7	6

Qualifying competition
1	(Belarus) Olga Govortsova	7	7
8	(Spain) Laura Pous Tió	5	5

==== Second qualifier ====
First round
2	(Romania) Simona Halep	7	6
(China) Han Xinyun	6^{5}	1
(France) Olivia Sanchez	4	7	2
(Australia) Jessica Moore	6	6^{5}	6
(South Korea) Lee Jin-a	2^{r}
(Slovenia) Maša Zec Peškirič	2
(Canada) Marie-Ève Pelletier	1	4
7	(Slovakia) Magdaléna Rybáriková	6	6

Second round
2	(Romania) Simona Halep	7	6
(Australia) Jessica Moore	5	0
(Slovenia) Maša Zec Peškirič	0	6	3
7	(Slovakia) Magdaléna Rybáriková	6	3	6

Qualifying competition
2	(Romania) Simona Halep	7	6^{3}	4
7	(Slovakia) Magdaléna Rybáriková	5	7	6

==== Third qualifier ====
First round
3	(Austria) Tamira Paszek	6	6
(Belarus) Darya Kustova	3	0
(Argentina) Florencia Molinero	6^{6}	1
(Canada) Stéphanie Dubois	7	6
(Australia) Sophie Ferguson	6	6
(Argentina) María Irigoyen	1	3
(Ukraine) Lesia Tsurenko	6	4	2
6	(Ukraine) Kateryna Bondarenko	4	6	6

Second round
3	(Austria) Tamira Paszek	6	6
(Canada) Stéphanie Dubois	4	1
(Australia) Sophie Ferguson	6	4	4
6	(Ukraine) Kateryna Bondarenko	4	6	6

Qualifying competition
3	(Austria) Tamira Paszek	6	6
6	(Ukraine) Kateryna Bondarenko	0	4

==== Fourth qualifier ====
First round
4	(China) Zhang Shuai	6	6
WC	(Australia) Monika Wejnert	1	1
(Italy) Corinna Dentoni	7	6
WC	(Australia) Ashling Sumner	6^{3}	0
(Latvia) Līga Dekmeijere	2	0
(Ukraine) Mariya Koryttseva	6	6
(Japan) Junri Namigata	6	1	1
5	(Italy) Alberta Brianti	1	6	6

Second round
4	(China) Zhang Shuai	6	6
(Italy) Corinna Dentoni	3	1
(Ukraine) Mariya Koryttseva	2	1
5	(Italy) Alberta Brianti	6	6

Qualifying competition
4	(China) Zhang Shuai	5	6	3
5	(Italy) Alberta Brianti	7	0	6
