= 2009 Moorilla Hobart International – Singles =

Singles
- 2009 Moorilla Hobart International

Final
- Champion: (Czech Republic) Petra Kvitová
- Runner-up: (Czech Republic) Iveta Benešová
- Score: 7–5, 6–1

Details
- Draw: 32
- Seeds: 8

Events
Singles	Doubles
← 2008 ·	Hobart International	· 2010 →

Eleni Daniilidou was the defending champion, but chose not to participate that year.

Petra Kvitová defeated Iveta Benešová in the final, 7–5, 6–1 for her maiden WTA title.

== Seeds ==
1. (Italy) Flavia Pennetta (second round)
2. (Switzerland) Patty Schnyder (first round)
3. (Russia) Anna Chakvetadze (first round)
4. (China) Zheng Jie (second round)
5. (Hungary) Ágnes Szávay (first round)
6. (Canada) Aleksandra Wozniak (first round)
7. (Ukraine) Alona Bondarenko (second round)
8. (Thailand) Tamarine Tanasugarn (first round)

== Draw ==
Key

- Q = Qualifier
- WC = Wild card
- LL = Lucky loser
- Alt = Alternate
- ITF = ITF entry
- PR = Protected ranking
- SR = Special ranking
- SE = Special exempt
- JE = Junior exempt
- JR = Junior Accelerator Programme entrant
- CO = College Accelerator Programme entrant
- NG = Next Gen Accelerator Program entrant
- w/o = Walkover
- r = Retired
- d = Defaulted

=== Finals ===
Semifinals
(Slovakia) Magdaléna Rybáriková	1	3
(Czech Republic) Iveta Benešová	6	6
(Czech Republic) Petra Kvitová	6	6
(France) Virginie Razzano	4	2

Final
(Czech Republic) Iveta Benešová	5	1
(Czech Republic) Petra Kvitová	7	6

=== Top half ===
First round
1	(Italy) F Pennetta	6	7
(Israel) S Pe'er	2	6^{5}
(Ukraine) K Bondarenko	6	6^{6}	1
(Slovakia) M Rybáriková	4	7	6
Q	(Hungary) M Czink	6	1	7
(Italy) T Garbin	2	6	5
Q	(Poland) U Radwańska	3	7	7
6	(Canada) A Wozniak	6	6^{3}	5
4	(China) J Zheng	6	4	6
(New Zealand) M Erakovic	1	6	1
Q	(Switzerland) S Vögele	2	3
(Argentina) G Dulko	6	6
(Italy) M Santangelo	6	6
(Czech Republic) N Vaidišová	1	1
(Czech Republic) I Benešová	7	7
8	(Thailand) T Tanasugarn	5	5

Second round
1	(Italy) F Pennetta	5	3
(Slovakia) M Rybáriková	7	6
Q	(Hungary) M Czink	4
Q	(Poland) U Radwańska	2	r
4	(China) J Zheng	3	3
(Argentina) G Dulko	6	6
(Italy) M Santangelo	3	1
(Czech Republic) I Benešová	6	6

Quarterfinals
(Slovakia) M Rybáriková	6	1	7
Q	(Hungary) M Czink	0	6	6^{7}
(Argentina) G Dulko	4	4
(Czech Republic) I Benešová	6	6

Semifinals
(Slovakia) M Rybáriková	1	3
(Czech Republic) I Benešová	6	6

=== Bottom half ===
First round
7	(Ukraine) A Bondarenko	6	2	6
(Romania) M Niculescu	4	6	2
WC	(Australia) S Peers	0	0
(Czech Republic) P Kvitová	6	6
(Russia) A Pavlyuchenkova	6	6
WC	(Australia) O Rogowska	3	1
(Spain) C Suárez Navarro	7	1	7
3	(Russia) A Chakvetadze	6^{5}	6	5
5	(Hungary) Á Szávay	3	5
(United Kingdom) A Keothavong	6	7
(France) V Razzano	6	6
Q	(Italy) ME Camerin	1	2
WC	(Australia) J Moore	0	3
(Belarus) O Govortsova	6	6
(Bulgaria) T Pironkova	6	6
2	(Switzerland) P Schnyder	2	4

Second round
7	(Ukraine) A Bondarenko	2	1
(Czech Republic) P Kvitová	6	6
(Russia) A Pavlyuchenkova	6	6
(Spain) C Suárez Navarro	4	1
(United Kingdom) A Keothavong	6	0	5
(France) V Razzano	4	6	7
(Belarus) O Govortsova	1	2
(Bulgaria) T Pironkova	6	6

Quarterfinals
(Czech Republic) P Kvitová	1	7	6
(Russia) A Pavlyuchenkova	6	5	3
(France) V Razzano	6	6
(Bulgaria) T Pironkova	4	1

Semifinals
(Czech Republic) P Kvitová	6	6
(France) V Razzano	4	2
