= 2008 Moorilla Hobart International – Singles =

Tennis tournament

Singles
- 2008 Moorilla Hobart International

Final
- Champions: (Greece) Eleni Daniilidou
- Runners-up: (Russia) Vera Zvonareva
- Score: walkover

Details
- Draw: 32
- Seeds: 8

Events
Singles	Doubles
← 2007 ·	Moorilla Hobart International	· 2009 →

Anna Chakvetadze was the defending champion, but chose not to participate that year.

Eleni Daniilidou won with a walkover, after Vera Zvonareva withdrew from the final due to a left ankle injury.

== Seeds ==
1. (Ukraine) Alona Bondarenko (second round)
2. (Russia) Vera Zvonareva (final, withdrew to a left ankle injury)
3. (Russia) Maria Kirilenko (withdrew due to a left knee injury)
4. (Poland) Agnieszka Radwańska (first round)
5. (Belarus) Victoria Azarenka (first round, retired due to a right abductor injury)
6. (India) Sania Mirza (quarterfinals)
7. (Ukraine) Julia Vakulenko (withdrew due to a wrist injury)
8. (Spain) Anabel Medina Garrigues (first round, retired due to a lower back injury)
9. (Argentina) Gisela Dulko (first round, retired due to a left hip injury)

== Draw ==
=== Key ===
- Q = Qualifier
- WC = Wild card
- LL = Lucky loser
- Alt = Alternate
- ITF = ITF entry
- PR = Protected ranking
- SR = Special ranking
- SE = Special exempt
- JE = Junior exempt
- JR = Junior Accelerator Programme entrant
- CO = College Accelerator Programme entrant
- NG = Next Gen Accelerator Program entrant
- w/o = Walkover
- r = Retired
- d = Defaulted

=== Finals ===
Semifinals
(Greece) Eleni Daniilidou	6	6
(Italy) Flavia Pennetta	4	3
Q	(United States) Ashley Harkleroad	2	1
2	(Russia) Vera Zvonareva	6	6

Final
(Greece) Eleni Daniilidou	w/o
2	(Russia) Vera Zvonareva

=== Top half ===
First round
1	(Ukraine) A Bondarenko	7	6
WC	(Australia) J Moore	5	2
(France) P Parmentier	3	4
(Greece) E Daniilidou	6	6
(Ukraine) K Bondarenko	3	4
(Russia) A Lapushchenkova	6	6
WC	(Australia) C Dellacqua	5
8	(Spain) A Medina Garrigues	4	r
4	(Poland) A Radwańska	4	6	2
(Italy) F Pennetta	6	1	6
(Germany) M Müller	4	6	2
Q	(Australia) J Dokić	6	0	6
LL	(Russia) A Kudryavtseva	6	6
WC	(Australia) M Adamczak	3	2
Q	(Spain) L Domínguez Lino	4	0
6	(India) S Mirza	6	6

Second round
1	(Ukraine) A Bondarenko	3	3
(Greece) E Daniilidou	6	6
(Russia) A Lapushchenkova	4	6	1
WC	(Australia) C Dellacqua	6	4	6
(Italy) F Pennetta	5
Q	(Australia) J Dokić	0	r
LL	(Russia) A Kudryavtseva	3	4
6	(India) S Mirza	6	6

Quarterfinals
(Greece) E Daniilidou	6	7
WC	(Australia) C Dellacqua	4	5
(Italy) F Pennetta	7	1	6
6	(India) S Mirza	5	6	3

Semifinals
(Greece) E Daniilidou	6	6
(Italy) F Pennetta	4	3

=== Bottom half ===
First round
5	(Belarus) V Azarenka	3	r
(Belarus) O Govortsova	1
Q	(Romania) E Gallovits	6	6
(Italy) A Brianti	2	3
(United States) M Tu	4	6	6
(France) É Loit	6	1	4
Q	(United States) A Harkleroad	6	6
LL	(Russia) Y Shvedova	4	3
9	(Argentina) G Dulko	3	1	r
(Spain) N Llagostera Vives	6	2
(Japan) A Morigami	4	5
(Russia) E Vesnina	6	7
(Romania) IR Olaru	3	6	7
(China) S Peng	6	4	5
(Russia) O Poutchkova	3	0
2	(Russia) V Zvonareva	6	6

Second round
(Belarus) O Govortsova	3	2
Q	(Romania) E Gallovits	6	6
(United States) M Tu	6^{9}	6	1
Q	(United States) A Harkleroad	7	2	6
(Spain) N Llagostera Vives	3	2
(Russia) E Vesnina	6	6
(Romania) IR Olaru	3	2
2	(Russia) V Zvonareva	6	6

Quarterfinals
Q	(Romania) E Gallovits	4	4
Q	(United States) A Harkleroad	6	6
(Russia) E Vesnina	3	3
2	(Russia) V Zvonareva	6	6

Semifinals
Q	(United States) A Harkleroad	2	1
2	(Russia) V Zvonareva	6	6
