= 2010 Moorilla Hobart International – Singles =

Tennis tournament

Singles
- 2010 Moorilla Hobart International

Final
- Champion: (Ukraine) Alona Bondarenko
- Runner-up: (Israel) Shahar Pe'er
- Score: 6–2, 6–4

Details
- Draw: 32
- Seeds: 8

Events
Singles	Doubles
← 2009 ·	Moorilla Hobart International	· 2011 →

Petra Kvitová was the defending champion, but lost in the final round of qualifying.

Alona Bondarenko won in the final, 6–2, 6–4, against Shahar Pe'er.

== Seeds ==
1. (Spain) Anabel Medina Garrigues (semifinals)
2. (Israel) Shahar Pe'er (final)
3. (Ukraine) Kateryna Bondarenko (second round)
4. (Ukraine) Alona Bondarenko (champion)
5. (Spain) Carla Suárez Navarro (quarterfinals)
6. (Canada) Aleksandra Wozniak (second round)
7. (China) Zheng Jie (quarterfinals)
8. (Argentina) Gisela Dulko (quarterfinals)

== Draw ==
=== Key ===
- Q = Qualifier
- WC = Wild card
- LL = Lucky loser
- Alt = Alternate
- ITF = ITF entry
- PR = Protected ranking
- SR = Special ranking
- SE = Special exempt
- JE = Junior exempt
- JR = Junior Accelerator Programme entrant
- CO = College Accelerator Programme entrant
- NG = Next Gen Accelerator Program entrant
- w/o = Walkover
- r = Retired
- d = Defaulted

=== Finals ===
Semifinals
1	(Spain) Anabel Medina Garrigues	6	3	4
4	(Ukraine) Alona Bondarenko	4	6	6
(Italy) Sara Errani	2	0
2	(Israel) Shahar Pe'er	6	6

Final
4	(Ukraine) Alona Bondarenko	6	6
2	(Israel) Shahar Pe'er	2	4

=== Top half ===
First round
1	(Spain) A Medina Garrigues	7	6
(Czech Republic) I Benešová	5	3
Q	(Russia) A Kudryavtseva	6	6
(Russia) E Makarova	0	0
(Austria) T Paszek	6	6
Q	(Italy) R Vinci	4	3
(Hungary) M Czink	4	2
8	(Argentina) G Dulko	6	6
4	(Ukraine) A Bondarenko	6	6
(Austria) S Bammer	4	1
(Romania) A Dulgheru	1	0
(France) A Cornet	6	6
(Romania) S Cîrstea	1	4
(China) S Peng	6	6
(Estonia) K Kanepi	6	3	6^{4}
7	(China) J Zheng	4	6	7

Second round
1	(Spain) A Medina Garrigues	3	6	6
Q	(Russia) A Kudryavtseva	6	3	1
(Austria) T Paszek	1	6	6^{5}
8	(Argentina) G Dulko	6	0	7
4	(Ukraine) A Bondarenko	6	3	6
(France) A Cornet	4	6	2
(China) S Peng	2	1
7	(China) J Zheng	6	6

Quarterfinals
1	(Spain) A Medina Garrigues	6	5	6
8	(Argentina) G Dulko	1	7	1
4	(Ukraine) A Bondarenko	7	7
7	(China) J Zheng	5	5

Semifinals
1	(Spain) A Medina Garrigues	6	3	4
4	(Ukraine) A Bondarenko	4	6	6

=== Bottom half ===
First round
6	(Canada) A Wozniak	6	6
(Slovakia) M Rybáriková	3	1
Q	(Belgium) K Flipkens	6	6
WC	(Australia) S Ferguson	2	2
(United States) M Oudin	6	3	5
(Italy) S Errani	3	6	7
(Czech Republic) L Šafářová	2	7	2^{r}
3	(Ukraine) K Bondarenko	6	6^{4}	3
5	(Spain) C Suárez Navarro	6	6
(Kazakhstan) Y Shvedova	1	2
WC	(Australia) A Molik	6	2	6
(India) S Mirza	4	6	3
(Australia) J Dokić	6	6
Q	(United Kingdom) E Baltacha	4	2
WC	(Australia) O Rogowska	3	2
2	(Israel) S Pe'er	6	6

Second round
6	(Canada) A Wozniak	5	2
Q	(Belgium) K Flipkens	7	6
(Italy) S Errani	7	6
3	(Ukraine) K Bondarenko	6^{8}	4
5	(Spain) C Suárez Navarro	7	3	6
WC	(Australia) A Molik	6^{2}	6	3
(Australia) J Dokić	2	2
2	(Israel) S Pe'er	6	6

Quarterfinals
Q	(Belgium) K Flipkens	3	4
(Italy) S Errani	6	6
5	(Spain) C Suárez Navarro	6	6^{4}	5
2	(Israel) S Pe'er	4	7	7

Semifinals
(Italy) S Errani	2	0
2	(Israel) S Pe'er	6	6
