= 2009 Moorilla Hobart International – Doubles =

Doubles
- 2009 Moorilla Hobart International

Final
- Champions: (Argentina) Gisela Dulko (Italy) Flavia Pennetta
- Runners-up: (Ukraine) Alona Bondarenko (Ukraine) Kateryna Bondarenko
- Score: 6–2, 7–6^{(7–4)}

Details
- Draw: 16
- Seeds: 4

Events
Singles	Doubles
← 2008 ·	Hobart International	· 2010 →

Anabel Medina Garrigues and Virginia Ruano Pascual were the defending champions but did not participate that year.

The 2009 champions were Gisela Dulko and Flavia Pennetta who beat sisters, Alona and Kateryna Bondarenko, in the final, 6–2, 7–6^{(7–4)}.

== Seeds ==
1. (Ukraine) Alona Bondarenko / (Ukraine) Kateryna Bondarenko (final)
2. (New Zealand) Marina Erakovic / (Romania) Monica Niculescu (first round)
3. (Hungary) Ágnes Szávay / (Russia) Elena Vesnina (first round)
4. (India) Sania Mirza / (Italy) Francesca Schiavone (quarterfinals)

== Draw ==
Key

- Q = Qualifier
- WC = Wild card
- LL = Lucky loser
- Alt = Alternate
- ITF = ITF entry
- PR = Protected ranking
- SR = Special ranking
- SE = Special exempt
- JE = Junior exempt
- JR = Junior Accelerator Programme entrant
- CO = College Accelerator Programme entrant
- NG = Next Gen Accelerator Program entrant
- w/o = Walkover
- r = Retired
- d = Defaulted

=== Draw ===
First round
1	(Ukraine) A Bondarenko (Ukraine) K Bondarenko	6	7
(United Kingdom) A Keothavong (Italy) M Santangelo	4	6^{3}
(Belarus) E Dzehalevich (Belarus) T Poutchek	6	6
WC	(Australia) J Moore (Australia) O Rogowska	2	4
4	(India) S Mirza (Italy) F Schiavone	7	6
(Latvia) L Dekmeijere (Turkey) İ Şenoğlu	6^{7}	4
(Italy) M E Camerin (Spain) L Domínguez Lino	4	0
(Romania) E Gallovits (Spain) A Parra Santonja	6	6
(India) S Uberoi (Germany) J Wöhr	6^{4}	7	6
(South Africa) N Grandin (United States) A Spears	7	5	[10]
(Argentina) G Dulko (Italy) F Pennetta	0
3	(Hungary) Á Szávay (Russia) E Vesnina	5	r
(Czech Republic) I Benešová (Czech Republic) B Záhlavová-Strýcová	4	6	[10]
(Russia) A Kudryavtseva (Thailand) T Tanasugarn	6	3	[5]
(United Kingdom) S Borwell (United States) C Nagle	2	6	[10]
2	(New Zealand) M Erakovic (Romania) M Niculescu	6	2	[8]

Quarterfinals
1	(Ukraine) A Bondarenko (Ukraine) K Bondarenko	6	6
(Belarus) E Dzehalevich (Belarus) T Poutchek	2	3
4	(India) S Mirza (Italy) F Schiavone	5	1
(Romania) E Gallovits (Spain) A Parra Santonja	7	6
(South Africa) N Grandin (United States) A Spears	4	5
(Argentina) G Dulko (Italy) F Pennetta	6	7
(Czech Republic) I Benešová (Czech Republic) B Záhlavová-Strýcová	6	6
(United Kingdom) S Borwell (United States) C Nagle	3	4

Semifinals
1	(Ukraine) A Bondarenko (Ukraine) K Bondarenko	6	6
(Romania) E Gallovits (Spain) A Parra Santonja	4	3
(Argentina) G Dulko (Italy) F Pennetta	4	6	[10]
(Czech Republic) I Benešová (Czech Republic) B Záhlavová-Strýcová	6	4	[7]

Final
1	(Ukraine) A Bondarenko (Ukraine) K Bondarenko	2	6^{4}
(Argentina) G Dulko (Italy) F Pennetta	6	7
