= 2009 Moorilla Hobart International =

- Date: 10–16 January
- Edition: 16th
- Category: WTA International
- Draw: 32S / 16D
- Prize money: $220,000
- Surface: Hard / outdoor
- Location: Hobart, Australia

Champions

Singles
- (Czech Republic) Petra Kvitová

Doubles
- (Argentina) Gisela Dulko / (Italy) Flavia Pennetta
← 2008 ·	Hobart International	· 2010 →

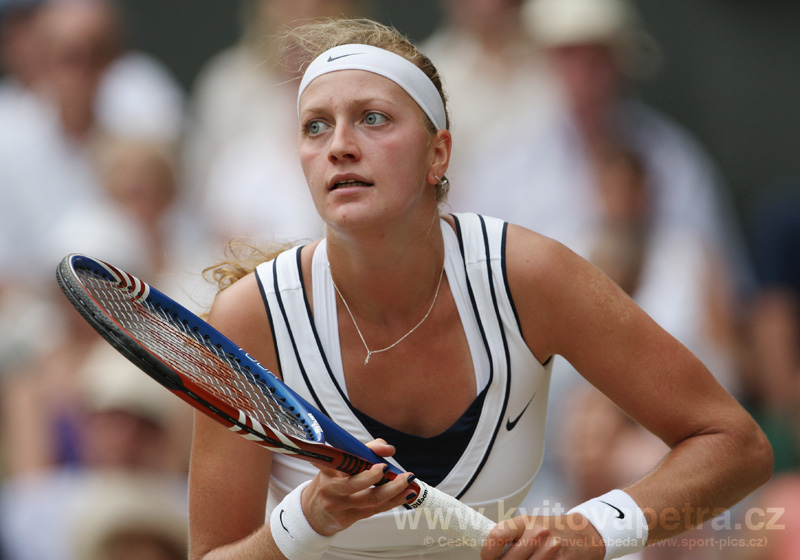
Petra Kvitova Final Wimbledon 2011

The 2009 Moorilla Hobart International was a women's tennis tournament played on outdoor hard courts. It was the 16th edition of the event and part of the WTA International tournaments of the 2009 WTA Tour. It took place at the Hobart International Tennis Centre in Hobart, Australia from 12 through 18 January 2009. Unseeded Petra Kvitová won the singles title.

== Finals ==
=== Singles ===
(Czech Republic) Petra Kvitová defeated (Czech Republic) Iveta Benešová, 7–5, 6–1

- It was Kvitová's only singles title of the year and the 1st of her career.

=== Doubles ===
(Argentina) Gisela Dulko / (Italy) Flavia Pennetta defeated (Ukraine) Alona Bondarenko / (Ukraine) Kateryna Bondarenko, 6–2, 7–6^{(7–4)}
