= 2007 Moorilla Hobart International – Singles =

Women's tennis competition

Singles
- 2007 Moorilla Hobart International

Final
- Champion: (Russia) Anna Chakvetadze
- Runner-up: (Russia) Vasilisa Bardina
- Score: 6–3, 7–6^{(7–3)}

Details
- Draw: 32
- Seeds: 8

Events
Singles	Doubles
← 2006 ·	Moorilla Hobart International	· 2008 →

Michaëlla Krajicek was the defending champion, but lost in the First Round to Séverine Brémond.

Anna Chakvetadze won in the Final against Vasilisa Bardina,6–3, 7–6^{(7–3)}.

== Seeds ==
1. (Russia) Anna Chakvetadze (champion)
2. (Spain) Anabel Medina Garrigues (second round)
3. (Italy) Flavia Pennetta (first round)
4. (Russia) Maria Kirilenko (first round)
5. (Italy) Mara Santangelo (second round)
6. (Ukraine) Alona Bondarenko (second round)
7. (China) Zheng Jie (quarterfinals)
8. (Germany) Martina Müller (first round)

== Draw ==
=== Key ===
- Q = Qualifier
- WC = Wild card
- LL = Lucky loser
- Alt = Alternate
- ITF = ITF entry
- PR = Protected ranking
- SR = Special ranking
- SE = Special exempt
- JE = Junior exempt
- JR = Junior Accelerator Programme entrant
- CO = College Accelerator Programme entrant
- NG = Next Gen Accelerator Program entrant
- w/o = Walkover
- r = Retired
- d = Defaulted

=== Finals ===
Semifinals
1	(Russia) Anna Chakvetadze	6	6
WC	(India) Sania Mirza	4	1
Q	(Russia) Vasilisa Bardina	6	6
(Austria) Sybille Bammer	3	1

Final
1	(Russia) Anna Chakvetadze	6	7^{7}
Q	(Russia) Vasilisa Bardina	3	6^{3}

=== Top half ===
First round
1	(Russia) A Chakvetadze	6	6
(Spain) L Domínguez Lino	0	4
Q	(Israel) T Obziler	6	2	6^{5}
(Russia) O Puchkova	0	6	7^{7}
(France) S Brémond	3	6	6
(Netherlands) M Krajicek	6	1	0
Q	(France) S Foretz	2	2
7	(China) J Zheng	6	6
4	(Russia) M Kirilenko	4	4
WC	(India) S Mirza	6	6
(Russia) E Likhovtseva	6^{3}	1
(Italy) R Oprandi	7^{7}	6
(Croatia) J Kostanić Tošić	6	1	2
WC	(Australia) A Molik	4	6	6
WC	(Australia) J Moore	2	6^{6}
6	(Ukraine) A Bondarenko	6	7^{8}

Second round
1	(Russia) A Chakvetadze	7^{8}	7
(Russia) O Puchkova	6^{6}	5
(France) S Brémond	1	3
7	(China) J Zheng	6	6
WC	(India) S Mirza	6^{2}	6	6
(Italy) R Oprandi	7^{7}	3	0
WC	(Australia) A Molik	6	7
6	(Ukraine) A Bondarenko	3	5

Quarterfinals
1	(Russia) A Chakvetadze	4	6	6
7	(China) J Zheng	6	1	1
WC	(India) S Mirza	6	6
WC	(Australia) A Molik	4	1

Semifinals
1	(Russia) A Chakvetadze	6	6
WC	(India) S Mirza	4	1

=== Bottom half ===
First round
5	(Italy) M Santangelo	7	2	6
(Italy) ME Camerin	5	6	3
(Italy) R Vinci	3	4
(Colombia) C Castaño	6	6
(Argentina) G Dulko	1	3
Q	(Russia) V Bardina	6	6
Q	(Japan) A Nakamura	7	7
3	(Italy) F Pennetta	5	5
8	(Germany) M Müller	6^{5}	2
(Czech Republic) L Šafářová	7^{7}	6
(Sweden) S Arvidsson	4	0
PR	(United States) S Williams	6	6
(Austria) S Bammer	7^{7}	6
(United States) A Harkleroad	6^{2}	1
(Russia) E Vesnina	1	3
2	(Spain) A Medina Garrigues	6	6

Second round
5	(Italy) M Santangelo	3	2
(Colombia) C Castaño	6	6
Q	(Russia) V Bardina	6	6
Q	(Japan) A Nakamura	4	4
(Czech Republic) L Šafářová	3	6	6^{5}
PR	(United States) S Williams	6	3	7^{7}
(Austria) S Bammer	6	6
2	(Spain) A Medina Garrigues	4	3

Quarterfinals
(Colombia) C Castaño	6	2	5
Q	(Russia) V Bardina	3	6	7
PR	(United States) S Williams	6	5	3
(Austria) S Bammer	3	7	6

Semifinals
Q	(Russia) V Bardina	6	6
(Austria) S Bammer	3	1

== Qualifying ==
=== Seeds ===
1. (Japan) Aiko Nakamura (qualified)
2. (Czech Republic) Iveta Benešová (withdrew due to still competing in Gold Coast)
3. (Poland) Agnieszka Radwańska (qualifying competition)
4. (Spain) Virginia Ruano Pascual (first round)
5. (Slovakia) Jarmila Gajdošová (first round)
6. (Russia) Vasilisa Bardina (qualified)
7. (Czech Republic) Eva Birnerová (first round)
8. (Japan) Akiko Morigami (first round)

=== Qualifiers ===
1. (Japan) Aiko Nakamura
2. (France) Stéphanie Foretz
3. (Russia) Vasilisa Bardina
4. (Israel) Tzipora Obziler

=== Draw ===
==== First qualifier ====
First round
1	(Japan) Aiko Nakamura	6	7^{7}
(United Kingdom) Anne Keothavong	1	6^{4}
WC	(Australia) Christina Wheeler	2	2
(Romania) Edina Gallovits	6	6
(China) Yuan Meng	6	6
(United States) Raquel Kops-Jones	4	3
(Czech Republic) Klára Zakopalová	6	6
5	(Slovakia) Jarmila Gajdošová	3	2

Second round
1	(Japan) Aiko Nakamura	7^{10}	6
(Romania) Edina Gallovits	6^{8}	2
(China) Yuan Meng	6^{5}	4
(Czech Republic) Klára Zakopalová	7^{7}	6

Qualifying competition
1	(Japan) Aiko Nakamura	6	6
(Czech Republic) Klára Zakopalová	3	3

==== Second qualifier ====
First round
Alt	(Japan) Ryōko Fuda	6	5	6
(United States) Abigail Spears	1	7	2
WC	(Australia) Karolina Wlodarczak	3	2
(France) Stéphanie Foretz	6	6
WC	(Australia) Lisa D'Amelio	3	2
(Poland) Marta Domachowska	6	6
(Austria) Yvonne Meusburger	6	6
7	(Czech Republic) Eva Birnerová	2	1

Second round
Alt	(Japan) Ryōko Fuda	7^{7}	2	0^{r}
(France) Stéphanie Foretz	6^{4}	6	2
(Poland) Marta Domachowska	3	6	3
(Austria) Yvonne Meusburger	6	0	6

Qualifying competition
(France) Stéphanie Foretz	6	6
(Austria) Yvonne Meusburger	4	3

==== Third qualifier ====
First round
3	(Poland) Agnieszka Radwańska	6	6
WC	(Australia) Anna Wishink	0	2
(Venezuela) Milagros Sequera	3	4
(Russia) Alla Kudryavtseva	6	6
(Belarus) Tatiana Poutchek	1	6	6
(Croatia) Karolina Šprem	6	2	1
(South Africa) Natalie Grandin	2	3
6	(Russia) Vasilisa Bardina	6	6

Second round
3	(Poland) Agnieszka Radwańska	6	6
(Russia) Alla Kudryavtseva	2	3
(Belarus) Tatiana Poutchek	6^{0}	2
6	(Russia) Vasilisa Bardina	7^{7}	6

Qualifying competition
3	(Poland) Agnieszka Radwańska	6	4	1
6	(Russia) Vasilisa Bardina	3	6	6

==== Fourth qualifier ====
First round
4	(Spain) Virginia Ruano Pascual	5	0
(Israel) Tzipora Obziler	7	6
(Spain) Laura Pous Tió	6	6^{3}	6
(Ukraine) Olga Savchuk	4	7^{7}	4
(Russia) Yaroslava Shvedova	1	6	6^{4}
(Belarus) Victoria Azarenka	6	4	7^{7}
(Switzerland) Emmanuelle Gagliardi	6	7^{7}
8	(Japan) Akiko Morigami	4	6^{3}

Second round
(Israel) Tzipora Obziler	6	6
(Spain) Laura Pous Tió	2	3
(Belarus) Victoria Azarenka	3	2^{r}
(Switzerland) Emmanuelle Gagliardi	6	5

Qualifying competition
(Israel) Tzipora Obziler	6	4	7
(Switzerland) Emmanuelle Gagliardi	3	6	5
