= 2011 Moorilla Hobart International =

- Date: 7–15 January
- Edition: 18th
- Category: WTA International tournaments
- Location: Hobart, Australia
- Venue: Hobart International Tennis Centre

Champions

Singles
- (Australia) Jarmila Groth

Doubles
- (Italy) Sara Errani / (Italy) Roberta Vinci
- Moorilla Hobart International

The 2011 Moorilla Hobart International was a women's tennis tournament played on outdoor hard courts. It was the 18th edition of the event and was part of the WTA International tournaments of the 2011 WTA Tour. It took place at the Hobart International Tennis Centre in Hobart, Australia from 7 through 15 January 2011.

== Finals ==
=== Singles ===
(Australia) Jarmila Groth defeated (United States) Bethanie Mattek-Sands, 6–4, 6–3

- It was Groth's first title of the year and 2nd of her career.

=== Doubles ===
(Italy) Sara Errani / (Italy) Roberta Vinci defeated (Ukraine) Kateryna Bondarenko / (Latvia) Līga Dekmeijere, 6–3, 7–5

== Entrants ==
=== Seeds ===
| Country | Player | Rank^{1} | Seed |
|---|---|---|---|
| FRA | Marion Bartoli | 16 | 1 |
| RUS | Anastasia Pavlyuchenkova | 21 | 2 |
| BUL | Tsvetana Pironkova | 35 | 3 |
| ITA | Roberta Vinci | 38 | 4 |
| CZE | Klára Zakopalová | 41 | 5 |
| AUS | Jarmila Groth | 42 | 6 |
| ITA | Sara Errani | 43 | 7 |
| GER | Angelique Kerber | 46 | 8 |

- as of 3 January 2011

=== Other entrants ===
The following players received wildcards into the singles main draw:

- (Australia) Alicia Molik
- (Australia) Sally Peers
- (Australia) Olivia Rogowska

The following players received entry from the qualifying draw:

- (Italy) Alberta Brianti
- (Belarus) Olga Govortsova
- (Austria) Tamira Paszek
- (Slovakia) Magdaléna Rybáriková
