= 2011 Moorilla Hobart International – Doubles =

Doubles
- 2011 Moorilla Hobart International

Final
- Champions: (Italy) Sara Errani (Italy) Roberta Vinci
- Runners-up: (Ukraine) Kateryna Bondarenko (Latvia) Līga Dekmeijere
- Score: 6–3, 7–5

Events
Singles	Doubles
← 2010 ·	Moorilla Hobart International	· 2012 →

Chuang Chia-jung and Květa Peschke were the defending champions after they defeated Chan Yung-jan and Monica Niculescu in the 2010 final. However, they chose to not participate this year.
3rd seeds Sara Errani and Roberta Vinci won in the final 6–3, 7–5, against Kateryna Bondarenko and Līga Dekmeijere.

== Seeds ==
1. (United States) Bethanie Mattek-Sands / (United States) Meghann Shaughnessy (quarterfinals, withdrew due to Mattek-Sands' participating in the singles final match)
2. (Belarus) Olga Govortsova / (Russia) Alla Kudryavtseva (first round)
3. (Italy) Sara Errani / (Italy) Roberta Vinci (champions)
4. (South Africa) Natalie Grandin / (Czech Republic) Vladimíra Uhlířová (quarterfinals)

== Draw ==
=== Key ===
- Q = Qualifier
- WC = Wild card
- LL = Lucky loser
- Alt = Alternate
- SE = Special exempt
- PR = Protected ranking
- ITF = ITF entry
- JE = Junior exempt
- w/o = Walkover
- r = Retired
- d = Defaulted
- SR = Special ranking

=== Draw ===
First round
1	(United States) B Mattek-Sands (United States) M Shaughnessy	6	6
(Australia) S Peers (Australia) O Rogowska	3	0
(Spain) A Parra Santonja (China) S Zhang	4	2
(Ukraine) K Bondarenko (Latvia) L Dekmeijere	6	6
4	(South Africa) N Grandin (Czech Republic) V Uhlířová	6	6
(Italy) A Brianti (Russia) A Chakvetadze	2	2
(Australia) J Groth (Czech Republic) K Zakopalová	6	6
(Canada) M-È Pelletier (Belarus) T Poutchek	3	1
(Russia) M Kondratieva (France) S Lefèvre	3	3
WC	(Australia) D Dominikovic (Australia) J Moore	6	6
WC	(Australia) S Ferguson (Australia) A Molik	2	1
3	(Italy) S Errani (Italy) R Vinci	6	6
(Sweden) J Larsson (Germany) J Wöhr	3	2
(United States) R Kops-Jones (United States) A Spears	6	6
(Uzbekistan) A Amanmuradova (Slovakia) M Rybáriková	5	7	[14]
2	(Belarus) O Govortsova (Russia) A Kudryavtseva	7	5	[12]

Quarterfinals
1	(United States) B Mattek-Sands (United States) M Shaughnessy
(Ukraine) K Bondarenko (Latvia) L Dekmeijere	w/o
4	(South Africa) N Grandin (Czech Republic) V Uhlířová	4	5
(Australia) J Groth (Czech Republic) K Zakopalová	6	7
WC	(Australia) D Dominikovic (Australia) J Moore	1	1
3	(Italy) S Errani (Italy) R Vinci	6	6
(United States) R Kops-Jones (United States) A Spears	6	7
(Uzbekistan) A Amanmuradova (Slovakia) M Rybáriková	4	5

Semifinals
(Ukraine) K Bondarenko (Latvia) L Dekmeijere	6	6
(Australia) J Groth (Czech Republic) K Zakopalová	4	2
3	(Italy) S Errani (Italy) R Vinci	6	6
(United States) R Kops-Jones (United States) A Spears	4	2

Final
(Ukraine) K Bondarenko (Latvia) L Dekmeijere	3	5
3	(Italy) S Errani (Italy) R Vinci	6	7
