= 2007 Moorilla Hobart International – Doubles =

Doubles
- 2007 ANZ Tasmanian International

Final
- Champion: (Russia) Elena Likhovtseva (Russia) Elena Vesnina
- Runner-up: (Spain) Anabel Medina Garrigues (Spain) Virginia Ruano Pascual
- Score: 2-6, 6-1, 6-2

Events
Singles	Doubles
← 2006 ·	ANZ Tasmanian International	· 2008 →

Émilie Loit and Nicole Pratt were the defending champions, but both chose not to participate that year.

Elena Likhovtseva and Elena Vesnina won in the final against Anabel Medina Garrigues and Virginia Ruano Pascual, 2-6, 6-1, 6-2.

== Seeds ==
1. (Spain) Anabel Medina Garrigues
  (Spain) Virginia Ruano Pascual (final)
2. (Italy) Maria Elena Camerin
  (Argentina) Gisela Dulko (semifinals)
3. (Czech Republic) Iveta Benešová
  (Netherlands) Michaëlla Krajicek (quarterfinals)
4. (Russia) Elena Likhovtseva
  (Russia) Elena Vesnina (champions)

== Draw ==
=== Key ===
- Q = Qualifier
- WC = Wild card
- LL = Lucky loser
- Alt = Alternate
- SE = Special exempt
- PR = Protected ranking
- ITF = ITF entry
- JE = Junior exempt
- w/o = Walkover
- r = Retired
- d = Defaulted
- SR = Special ranking

=== Draw ===
First round
1	(Spain) A Medina Garrigues (Spain) V Ruano Pascual	6	6
(Russia) A Chakvetadze (Italy) M Santangelo	0	1
(Russia) A Rodionova (Romania) A Vanc	7^{7}	6
(Poland) K Jans (Poland) A Rosolska	6^{4}	4
3	(Czech Republic) I Benešová (Netherlands) M Krajicek	6^{4}	6	6
(Slovakia) J Gajdošová (Australia) B Stewart	7^{7}	0	4
WC	(Australia) J Moore (Australia) A Wishink	3	2
(Spain) L Domínguez Lino (Italy) F Pennetta	6	6
(Japan) A Morigami (Czech Republic) V Uhlířová	7^{7}	6
(Czech Republic) E Birnerová (Belarus) A Yakimova	6^{4}	3
(France) S Foretz (Germany) M Müller	2	5
4	(Russia) E Likhovtseva (Russia) E Vesnina	6	7
(India) S Mirza (Australia) A Molik	6	7^{8}
(Ukraine) A Bondarenko (Ukraine) K Bondarenko	1	6^{6}
(Poland) M Domachowska (Italy) R Vinci	4	3
2	(Italy) ME Camerin (Argentina) G Dulko	6	6

Quarterfinals
1	(Spain) A Medina Garrigues (Spain) V Ruano Pascual	6	6
(Russia) A Rodionova (Romania) A Vanc	2	4
3	(Czech Republic) I Benešová (Netherlands) M Krajicek	6	3	4
(Spain) L Domínguez Lino (Italy) F Pennetta	4	6	6
(Japan) A Morigami (Czech Republic) V Uhlířová	6	3	4
4	(Russia) E Likhovtseva (Russia) E Vesnina	3	6	6
(India) S Mirza (Australia) A Molik	6^{5}	6^{1}
2	(Italy) ME Camerin (Argentina) G Dulko	7^{7}	7^{7}

Semifinals
1	(Spain) A Medina Garrigues (Spain) V Ruano Pascual	6	3	6
(Spain) L Domínguez Lino (Italy) F Pennetta	3	6	3
4	(Russia) E Likhovtseva (Russia) E Vesnina	6	6
2	(Italy) ME Camerin (Argentina) G Dulko	1	3

Final
1	(Spain) A Medina Garrigues (Spain) V Ruano Pascual	6	1	2
4	(Russia) E Likhovtseva (Russia) E Vesnina	2	6	6
