= 2008 Moorilla Hobart International =

- Date: 6–11 January
- Edition: 15th
- Location: Hobart, Australia

Champions

Singles
- (Greece) Eleni Daniilidou

Doubles
- (Spain) Anabel Medina Garrigues / (Spain) Virginia Ruano Pascual
← 2007 ·	Moorilla Hobart International	· 2009 →

The 2008 Moorilla Hobart International was a women's tennis tournament played on outdoor hard courts. It was the 15th edition of the Moorilla Hobart International, and was part of the Tier IV Series of the 2008 WTA Tour. It took place at the Hobart International Tennis Centre in Hobart, Australia, from 6 through 11 January 2008.

== Finals ==
=== Singles ===
(Greece) Eleni Daniilidou defeated (Russia) Vera Zvonareva, walkover

- It was Daniilidou's 1st title of the year, and her 5th overall.

=== Doubles ===
(Spain) Anabel Medina Garrigues / (Spain) Virginia Ruano Pascual defeated (Greece) Eleni Daniilidou / (Germany) Jasmin Wöhr, 6–2, 6–4
