= 2007 Moorilla Hobart International =

- Date: 7–12 January
- Edition: 14th
- Category: Tier IV
- Surface: Hard / outdoor
- Location: Hobart, Australia

Champions

Singles
- (Russia) Anna Chakvetadze

Doubles
- (Russia) Elena Likhovtseva / (Russia) Elena Vesnina
← 2006 ·	Moorilla Hobart International	· 2008 →

The 2007 Moorilla Hobart International was a tennis tournament played on outdoor hard courts. It was the 14th edition of the Moorilla Hobart International, and was part of the Tier IV Series of the 2007 WTA Tour. It took place at the Hobart International Tennis Centre in Hobart, Australia, from 7 January through 12 January 2007. First-seeded Anna Chakvetadze won the singles title.

== Finals ==
=== Singles ===
(Russia) Anna Chakvetadze defeated (Russia) Vasilisa Bardina, 6–3, 7–6^{(7–3)}

=== Doubles ===
(Russia) Elena Likhovtseva / (Russia) Elena Vesnina defeated (Spain) Anabel Medina Garrigues / (Spain) Virginia Ruano Pascual, 2–6, 6–1, 6–2
