= Kateryna Volodko =

Ukrainian tennis player (born 1986)

Kateryna Volodko Катерина Волoдько
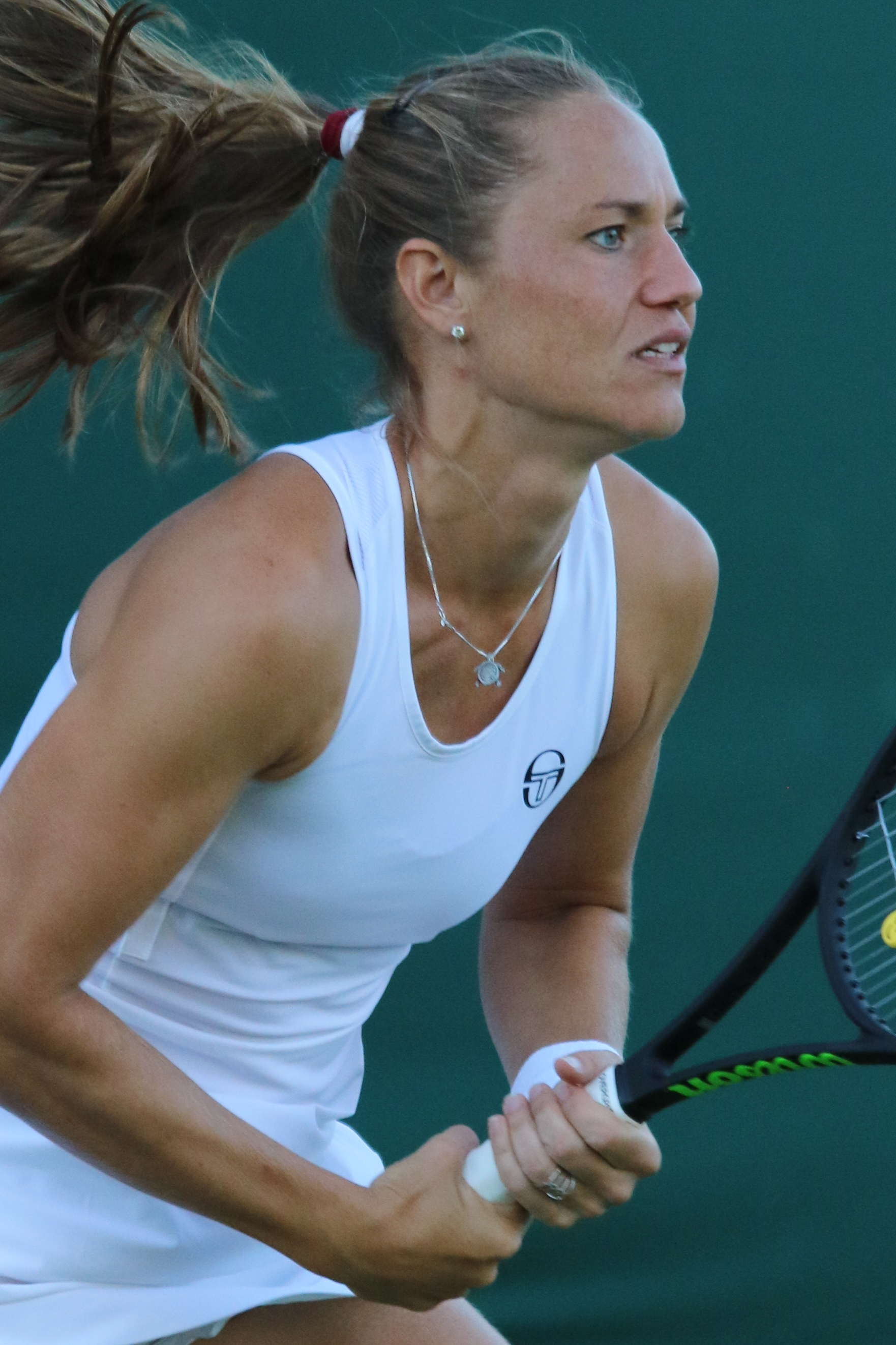
- Bondarenko at the 2018 Wimbledon Championships
- Full name: Kateryna Volodymyrivna Volodko
- Country (sports): Ukraine
- Residence: Kyiv, Ukraine
- Born: 8 August 1986 (age 40) Kryvyi Rih, Ukrainian SSR, Soviet Union
- Height: 1.75 m (5 ft 9 in)
- Turned pro: 2000
- Plays: Right-handed (two-handed backhand)
- Coach: Alona Bondarenko
- Prize money: US$4,319,887

Singles
- Career record: 531–412
- Career titles: 2
- Highest ranking: No. 29 (12 October 2009)
- Current ranking: No. 492 (4 November 2024)

Grand Slam singles results
- Australian Open: 3R (2009, 2016, 2018)
- French Open: 3R (2009)
- Wimbledon: 3R (2011)
- US Open: QF (2009)

Doubles
- Career record: 276–274
- Career titles: 4
- Highest ranking: No. 9 (20 October 2008)
- Current ranking: No. 602 (4 November 2024)

Grand Slam doubles results
- Australian Open: W (2008)
- French Open: SF (2008)
- Wimbledon: 2R (2007)
- US Open: 3R (2008)

Other doubles tournaments
- Olympic Games: SF (2008)

Team competitions
- Fed Cup: 23–11
- Last updated on: 4 November 2024.

Kateryna Volodymyrivna Volodko (née Bondarenko; Ukrainian: Катерина Володимирівна Бондаренко; born 8 August 1986) is a tennis player from Ukraine. Her career-high rankings are world No. 29 in singles and No. 9 in doubles. She was the doubles champion at the 2008 Australian Open, partnering her sister Alona Bondarenko.

Her best Grand Slam performance in singles was reaching the quarterfinals at the 2009 US Open. Over her career, Bondarenko has defeated top ten players Elena Dementieva, Sara Errani, Ana Ivanovic, Garbiñe Muguruza, Li Na, Agnieszka Radwańska, Roberta Vinci, and Venus Williams.

== Personal life ==
Kateryna is the younger sister of professional tennis players Valeria Bondarenko and Alona Bondarenko.

Bondarenko was born on 8 August 1986 in Kryvyi Rih, Ukrainian SSR (nowadays Ukraine) to father, Vladimir, and mother, Natalia. She was introduced to tennis at the age of four by her parents in 1990. She has two sisters, Valeria and Alona, both used to play on the WTA Tour. Her favourite surface is hardcourt. In September 2011, Bondarenko married Denis Volodko. Their first child, Karin, was born in 2013. Bondarenko gave birth to her second child in 2019. In 2022, she changed her name to Kateryna Volodko.

== Tennis career ==
=== 2008: First WTA Tour title ===
Bondarenko began season at the Hobart International where she lost in the first round to world No. 144, Anna Lapushchenkova. At the Australian Open, she lost in the first round to world No. 69, Aravane Rezaï. However, on 24 January 2008, paired with her sister Alona, she won the doubles tournament at the Australian Open without seeding, defeating in the final the No. 12-seeded pair Victoria Azarenka/Shahar Pe'er, in three sets.

After that, she played for Ukraine in the tie against Belgium in the 2008 Fed Cup World Group II. She lost her first match to Yanina Wickmayer and won her last match defeating Tamaryn Hendler. Ukraine defeated Belgium 3–2. At the Paris Indoor, she upset fifth seed and defending champion, Nadia Petrova, in the first round, in three sets, and she defeated qualifier and compatriot Yuliana Fedak. In the quarterfinals, she lost to fourth seed Elena Dementieva in straight sets. In doubles, she partnered with her sister Alona, and they won the tournament defeating Czech pair Vladimíra Uhlířová/Eva Hrdinová in the final. Bondarenko then played at the Diamond Games in Antwerp, where she beat qualifier and compatriot Tatiana Perebiynis and young Russian Alisa Kleybanova. During the match, she suffered a left hip strain. In doubles, partnering up with her sister Alona, they lost in the semifinals to second seeds Květa Peschke/Ai Sugiyama. Kateryna's injury prevented her from playing at the Qatar Open.

Bondarenko returned at the Indian Wells Open. Seeded No. 30 and getting a first-round bye, she was upset in the second round by world No. 216, Jie Zheng. At the Miami Open, she defeated Pauline Parmentier, in the second round, she lost to tenth seed Elena Dementieva. Playing for Ukraine again at the 2008 Fed Cup World Group play-offs, Ukraine faced Italy. Bondarenko played one rubber, but she lost to Sara Errani. In the end, Italy defeated Ukraine 3–2.

She began clay-court season at the German Open in Berlin where she beat world No. 45, Tamira Paszek. but lost in the second round to seventh seed and eventual finalist Dementieva. At the Italian Open, Bondarenko defeated world No. 53, Tathiana Garbin. Then, she lost to sixth seed Anna Chakvetadze. Playing at Strasbourg, she lost in the first round to world No. 93, Petra Kvitová. At the French Open, Bondarenko lost in the first round to 13th seed and eventual finalist Dinara Safina. However, in doubles, she and Alona reached the semifinals where they lost to Casey Dellacqua/Francesca Schiavone.

Bondarenko began grass-court season at the Birmingham Classic. Seeded 12th, she stunned world No. 92, Anne Keothavong, in the first and qualifier Samantha Stosur, in the second round. In the third round, she beat lucky loser Melinda Czink, in three sets. In her second quarterfinal of the year she beat world No. 52, Petra Cetkovská, to reach her first WTA Tour semifinal where she defeated world No. 64, Marina Erakovic, to reach her first WTA singles final. In the final, Bondarenko defeated world No. 85, Yanina Wickmayer, to win her only WTA singles title. The week after, she played at the Rosmalen Open where she lost in the first round to qualifier and eventual champion, Tamarine Tanasugarn. At Wimbledon, Bondarenko defeated qualifier Rika Fujiwara. In the second round, she lost to fourth seed Svetlana Kuznetsova, in straight sets.

Bondarenko began the US Open Series at the Stanford Classic where she beat world No. 72, Ashley Harkleroad, but lost in the second round to world No. 32, Dominika Cibulková. At the LA Championships, she lost in the first round to world No. 122, Meng Yuan, in three sets. Seeded seventh at the Nordic Light Open, she lost in the first round to world No. 77, Camille Pin. Bondarenko represented Ukraine at the Beijing Olympics. She lost in the first round to fifth seed and eventual gold medalist Elena Dementieva. This was the fourth time that year that Bondarenko has lost to Dementieva. In doubles, she and Alona reached the semifinals where they lost to second seeds Serena Williams/Venus Williams, in three sets. In the bronze medal match, they lost to Chinese pair Yan Zi/Zheng Jie, and ended in fourth place. Bondarenko lost in the first round at the US Open to fourth seed and eventual champion Serena Williams. In doubles, she and Alona lost in the third round to tenth seeds and eventual finalists Lisa Raymond/Samantha Stosur.

Bondarenko qualified for the Porsche Tennis Grand Prix defeating Lucie Hradecká in the final round of qualifying. She beat world No. 15, Flavia Pennetta, in the second round, she lost to sixth seed Venus Williams. At the Kremlin Cup, Bondarenko lost in the first round of qualifying to Aravane Rezaï. At the Zurich Open, she lost in the final round of qualifying to Monica Niculescu. Playing her final tournament of the year, the Ladies Linz, she lost in the first round to fifth seed Nadia Petrova in three sets.

Bondarenko ended the year ranked No. 63 in singles and No. 10 in doubles.

=== 2009: US Open quarterfinal ===
Bondarenko began her season at the Brisbane International. She lost in the first round to second seed and eventual champion Victoria Azarenka. Next, she played at the Hobart International. She lost in the first round to world No. 57, Magdaléna Rybáriková. In doubles, Bondarenko partnered with her sister Alona. They reached the final which they lost to Gisela Dulko/Flavia Pennetta, in two sets. At the Australian Open, Bondarenko upset ninth seed Agnieszka Radwańska in the first round. In the second round, she beat world No. 90, Lourdes Domínguez Lino. In the third round, she lost to 22nd seed Zheng Jie, in straight sets.

=== 2012: Retirement from tennis ===
Bondarenko started off her 2012 season by playing doubles at Hobart. Partnering with Anastasia Rodionova, she defeated Shuko Aoyama/Irina Falconi in the first round. In the quarterfinals, they upset top seeds Lucie Hradecká/Anabel Medina Garrigues. In the semifinals, they lost to third seeds Chuang Chia-jung/Marina Erakovic in the super tie-breaker. Bondarenko next participated at the Australian Open. In the first round, she lost to world No. 66, Vania King.

She played for Ukraine in the Fed Cup tie against Italy. She lost both of her matches to Sara Errani and Francesca Schiavone. Italy defeated Ukraine 3–2. Seeded sixth for qualifying at the Qatar Ladies Open, she qualified beating Alizé Lim and 13th seed Casey Dellacqua, in straight sets, respectively. In the first round, she beat fellow qualifier Vera Dushevina, before she went over world No. 23, Flavia Pennetta. In the third round, Bondarenko lost to world No. 31, Monica Niculescu. Playing qualifying at Dubai, she was beaten in the second round of qualifying by Aleksandra Wozniak. Seeded second for qualifying at Indian Wells, Bondarenko lost in the first round to Paula Ormaechea. Seeded top in qualifying at Miami, she defeated Mirjana Lučić in the final round of qualifying. In the first round, she beat fellow qualifier Urszula Radwańska. In the second, she lost to 20th seed Daniela Hantuchová in a tough three-set match.

Bondarenko began clay-court season at the Charleston Cup. In the first round, she defeated world No. 84, Olga Govortsova. In the second round, she lost easily to fourth seed Vera Zvonareva. At the Porsche Grand Prix, Bondarenko reached the final round of qualifying where she lost to Anna Chakvetadze. Still entering the draw as a lucky loser, she lost in the first round to qualifier Gréta Arn. At the Italian Open, she retired in the first round of qualifying, trailing 7–6 to Anastasia Rodionova. At the Brussels Open, she lost in the first round to tenth seed Nadia Petrova. Playing at the French Open, Bondarenko lost in the first round to qualifier Chan Yung-jan.

She played only one grass-court tournament to prepare for Wimbledon. At the Rosmalen Open, she upset second seed Sara Errani in the first round in three sets. In the second round, she lost to world No. 53, Kim Clijsters. At Wimbledon, she beat world No. 82, Kimiko Date-Krumm, in the first round but was eliminated in the second by 14th seed Ana Ivanovic. Bondarenko had led their head-to-head 2–0.

At the Swedish Open, she defeated qualifier Carina Witthöft in the first round, in two sets. In the second, she lost to seventh seed Mona Barthel in straight sets. Representing Ukraine at the Summer Olympics, Bondarenko lost in the first round to sixth seed Petra Kvitová, in three sets.

Playing qualifying at the Cincinnati Open, she lost in the final round of qualifying to Eleni Daniilidou. At the New Haven Open, Bondarenko was defeated in the first round of qualifying by Anastasia Rodionova. At the US Open, the final tournament of her career, she lost in the first round to 30th seed and former world No. 1, Jelena Janković.

Bondarenko then retired from the WTA Tour due to being pregnant.

=== 2014: Return from pregnancy ===
She made her return in the qualifying for the Katowice Open, where she lost to Kristína Kučová from Slovakia in two sets.

At the French Open, Bondarenko lost in the first round of qualifying to Indy de Vroome. She made a quarterfinal at the $10k event in Budapest, Hungary and also at the $25k event in Kristinehamn, where she won the doubles partnering Cornelia Lister from Sweden. She lost to Kateřina Siniaková in three sets in the first round of qualifying for Bad Gastein, and in the second round of qualifying against Yulia Putintseva at Båstad after beating Stephanie Vogt in two sets.

Bondarenko managed to qualify for Baku by beating Jovana Jakšić, in straight sets, but she lost in the first round to Julia Glushko, in three sets. She received a wildcard into the first round of the Tashkent Open where she fell to the top seed and defending champion Bojana Jovanovski in a tight three set match. She won a $25k event in Monterrey by beating Ana Vrljić. A few weeks later she won a $50k event in Macon by beating Grace Min in the final in two sets. Her last tournament of the year was a $50k event in Captiva Island, where she was beaten by Julia Glushko in three sets.

=== 2015: Back in the game ===
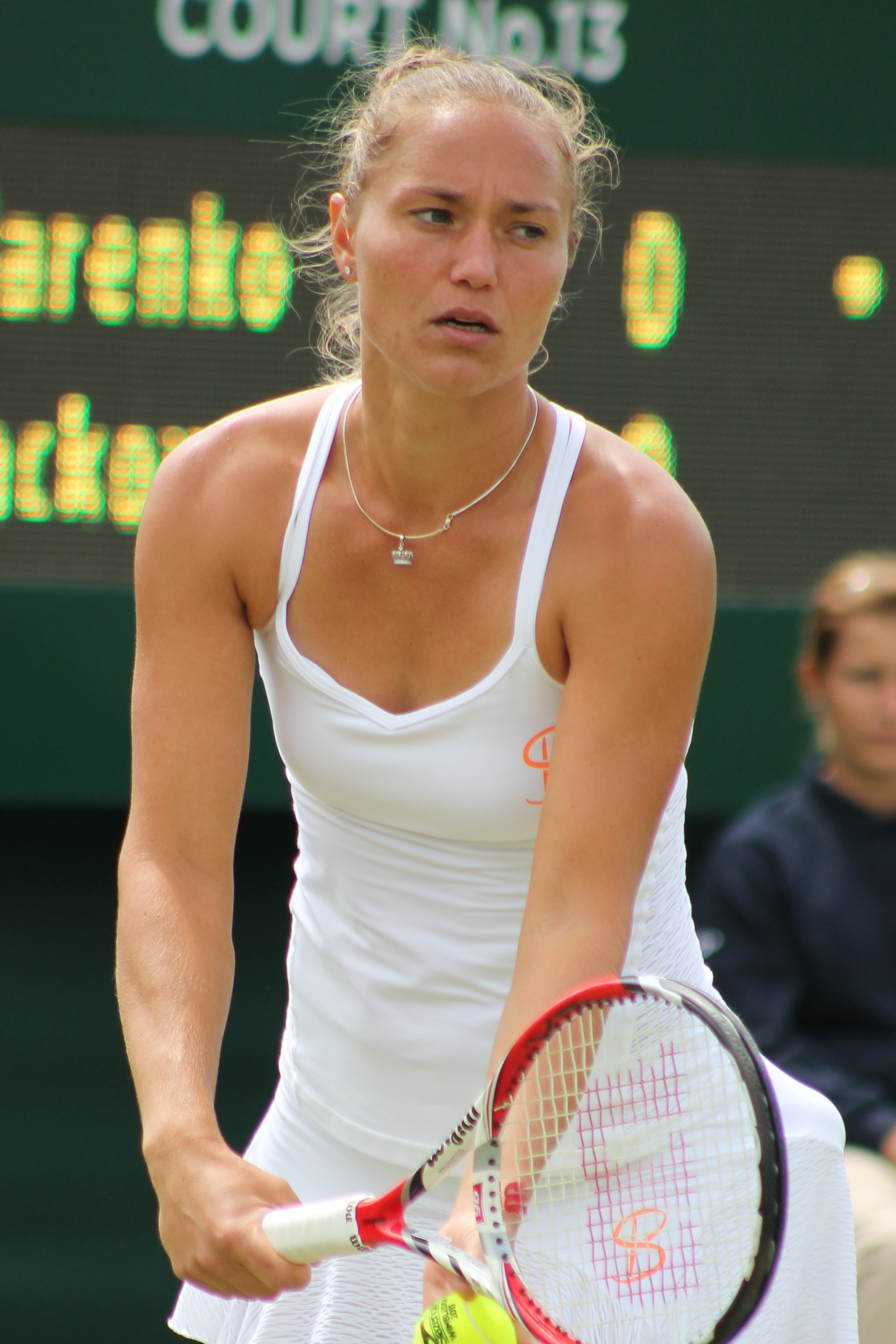
Bondarenko about to serve at the 2015 Wimbledon Championships

Bondarenko began season by playing qualifying at the Australian Open but lost in the second round to 22nd seed Laura Siegemund, in straight sets.

Next, she played at the Diamond Games where she qualified for her first Premier-level tournament since coming back to the WTA Tour by defeating Dinah Pfizenmaier in the final round of qualifying. In the main draw, she lost to sixth seed Dominika Cibulková. At the Abierto Mexicano, she lost in the second round of qualifying to sixth seed Richèl Hogenkamp. She then played at the Monterrey Open where she lost in the final round of qualifying to fourth seed Tímea Babos.

Bondarenko began clay-court season at the Charleston Open. Seeded 15th in qualifying, she qualified by defeating Beatriz Haddad Maia in the final round. In the main draw, she had her first WTA Tour win since she returned from retirement by beating Alison Riske in three sets. In the second round, Bondarenko lost to seventh seed and eventual finalist, Madison Keys. Bondarenko qualified for the Porsche Tennis Grand Prix by beating Alexa Glatch in the final round of qualifying, before she lost in the first round to Lucie Šafářová. At the Prague Open, she lost in the second round of qualifying to sixth seed Danka Kovinić, in straight sets. However, in doubles, Bondarenko partnered up with Eva Hrdinová. They reached the final, losing to Belinda Bencic and Kateřina Siniaková. At the Madrid Open, Bondarenko lost in the first round of qualifying to 14th seed Marina Erakovic. In the qualifying for the French Open, she lost in the final round to Alexa Glatch, in three sets.

She began grass-court season by playing qualifying at the first edition of the Nottingham Open where she lost in the first round to compatriot Olga Savchuk. At the Birmingham Classic, Bondarenko qualified by beating 13th seed Yanina Wickmayer in the final round. In the first round of the main draw, she was defeated by Zarina Diyas in two tiebreaks. Seeded tenth for qualifying at Wimbledon, Bondarenko was defeated in the second round by Elise Mertens.

In the first round of the Bucharest Open, she lost to Shahar Pe'er. Seeded fourth for qualifying at the İstanbul Cup, Bondarenko qualified by beating Hiroko Kuwata and Nastassja Burnett. In the main draw, she upset top seed Venus Williams in straight sets, and in the second round Mona Barthel, in a three-setter. In the quarterfinals, she lost a close match to compatriot and eventual champion, Lesia Tsurenko. At the Baku Cup, Bondarenko beat qualifier Valentyna Ivakhnenko in the first round. In the second round, she retired trailing 0–3 to Anastasia Pavlyuchenkova due to a right lower leg injury.

Bondarenko started US Open Series by playing qualifying at the Stanford Classic. Seeded second, she qualified by defeating wildcard Caroline Doyle and sixth seed Petra Martić. In the first round, she lost to eighth seed and compatriot Elina Svitolina. Bondarenko qualified for the Western & Southern Open in Cincinnati, beating 19th seed Lara Arruabarrena and Jana Čepelová. In the first round, she lost in a tough match to world No. 26, Eugenie Bouchard. Seeded 6th for qualifying at the US Open, Bondarenko made it through qualifying to qualify for the main draw defeating 18th seed Nao Hibino in the final round of qualifying. In the first round, she beat world No. 78, Yulia Putintseva. In the second round, Bondarenko lost with a fight to second seed Simona Halep. This performance made her re-enter the top 90 in the rankings.

After the US Open, she turned to the Asian swing. At the Japan Women's Open, Bondarenko upset top seed Carla Suárez Navarro in the first round. In the second round, she beat Jarmila Gajdošová. In the quarterfinals, she lost to eventual champion Yanina Wickmayer in three sets. Seeded third for qualifying at the Pan Pacific Open, Bondarenko qualified defeating sixth seed Nao Hibino in the last round of qualifying. In the first round, she lost to sixth seed Suárez Navarro. Seeded 15th for qualifying at the China Open, Bondarenko made it through qualifying by beating fourth seed Heather Watson in the final round of qualifying. In the first round, she defeated Barbora Strýcová. In the second round, she lost to 14th seed Madison Keys in three sets. Her final tournament of the year was the Tianjin Open. In the first round, Bondarenko lost to eventual finalist Danka Kovinić.

She ended the year ranked No. 88.

=== 2016: Second Australian Open third round ===
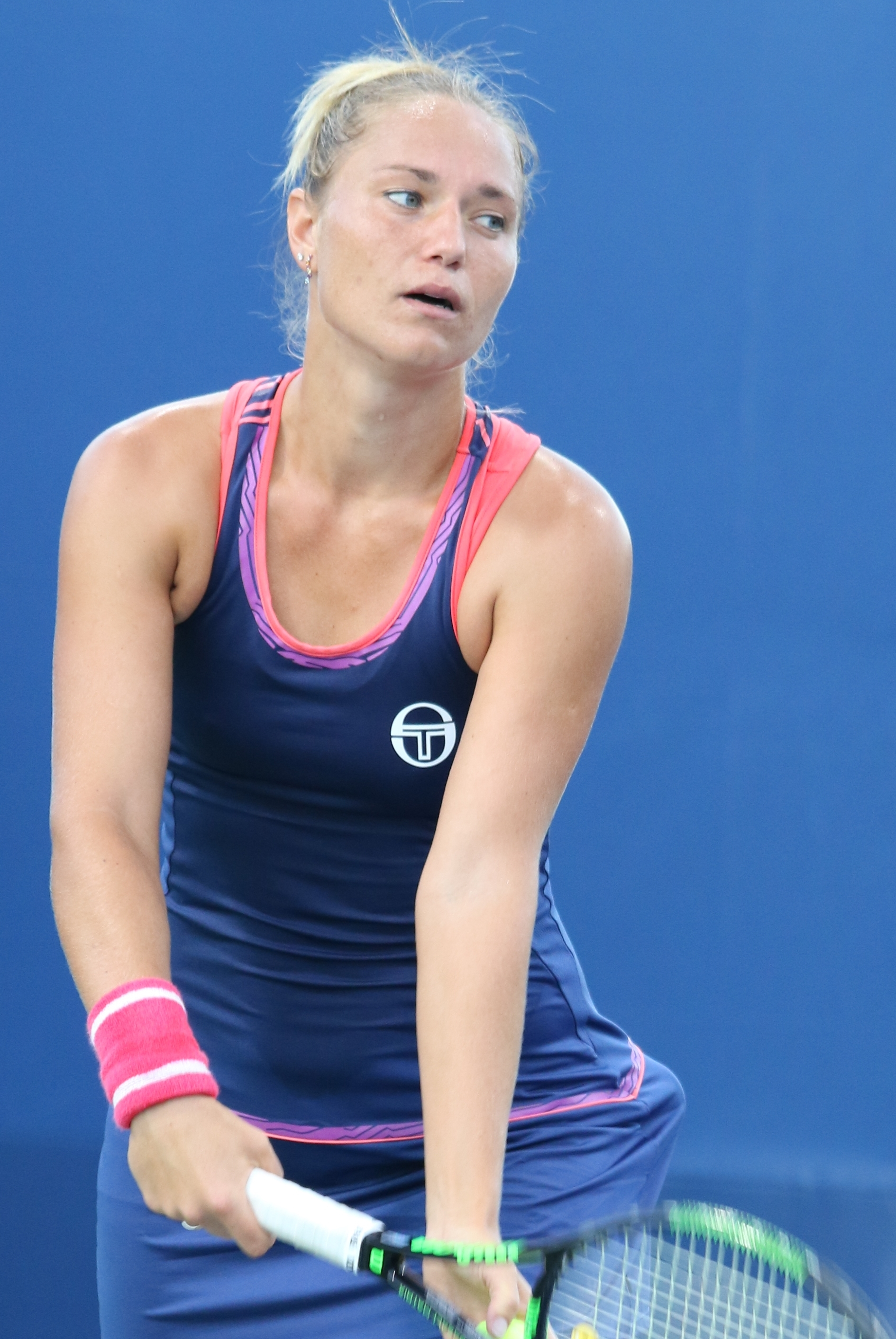
Bondarenko at the 2016 US Open

Bondarenko started the year by playing qualifying at the Brisbane International and qualified for the main draw by beating Naomi Osaka in the final round of qualifying. In the first round, she lost to world No. 40, Madison Brengle in three sets. She played qualifying at the Hobart International and lost in the first round to Pauline Parmentier.

At the Australian Open, she defeated world No. 67, Ajla Tomljanović, in the first round. In the second, she earned her first win over 23rd seed Svetlana Kuznetsova to reach the third round for the first time since 2009. In the third round, Bondarenko lost in three sets to 12th seed Belinda Bencic.

Playing qualifying at the Dubai Championships, Bondarenko beat Anastasija Sevastova. In the second round of qualifying, she lost to Tsvetana Pironkova. Bondarenko qualified for the Qatar Ladies Open defeating María José Martínez Sánchez and ninth seed Evgeniya Rodina. In the first round of the main draw, she defeated world No. 40, Annika Beck. In the second round, she lost to third seed Agnieszka Radwańska. At the Indian Wells Open, she qualified for the main draw beating Paula Kania, and 19th seed Lourdes Domínguez Lino. In the main draw, she defeated world No. 46, Alison Van Uytvanck, and she rallied to upset 24th seed Anastasia Pavlyuchenkova, in three sets. She also beat compatriot and world No. 36, Lesia Tsurenko, to reach the fourth round for the first time at Indian Wells. In the fourth round, Bondarenko lost to world No. 1, Serena Williams. Nevertheless, this was her best performance at Indian Wells. At the Miami Open, Bondarenko lost in the first round to world No. 36, Daria Kasatkina.

Bondarenko began clay-court season at the Charleston Open. In the first round, she upset 16th seed Misaki Doi. In the second round, Bondarenko lost to qualifier Kristína Kučová. Seeded seventh at the İstanbul Cup, Bondarenko defeated world No. 98, Olga Govortsova, in the first round. In the second round, she lost again to qualifier Kristína Kučová. At the Madrid Open, Bondarenko lost in the first round of qualifying to Kateřina Siniaková. Her final tournament before the French Open was the Internationaux de Strasbourg. In the first round, she beat world No. 54, Heather Watson. In the second round, Bondarenko lost to seventh seed Elena Vesnina. At the French Open, Bondarenko upset seventh seed Roberta Vinci in the first round. In the second round, she lost to world No. 39, Annika Beck.

Bondarenko began her grass-court season by playing qualifying at the Birmingham Classic. She lost in the final round of qualifying to fifth seed and grass-court specialist Tsvetana Pironkova. At the Eastbourne International, she qualified by beating Carina Witthöft and Anett Kontaveit. In the first round of the main draw, she defeated world No. 38, Yulia Putintseva in three sets4. In the second, Bondarenko upset sixth seed Svetlana Kuznetsova. In the third round, she lost to 12th seed and eventual champion Dominika Cibulková. At Wimbledon, Bondarenko lost in the first round to 27th seed CoCo Vandeweghe.

She began the US Open Series by competing at Stanford and lost in the first round to world No. 156, Urszula Radwańska in straight sets. Bondarenko qualified for the Rogers Cup beating Xu Yifan and wildcard Bianca Andreescu. In the first round, she lost to 14th seed Karolína Plíšková. Bondarenko qualified for the Western & Southern Open defeating wildcard Sofia Kenin and wildcard Jamie Loeb. In the first round, she lost to world No. 37, Kristina Mladenovic. Playing qualifying at the Connecticut Open, Bondarenko defeated wildcard Julia Elbaba in the first round of qualifying. In the second round of qualifying, she retired trailing 1–3 to Nicole Gibbs. In doubles, she and her partner Chuang Chia-jung reached the final where they lost to second seeds Sania Mirza/Monica Niculescu. At the US Open, Bondarenko defeated Hsieh Su-wei in the first round. In the second round, she beat world No. 61, Zheng Saisai, in a tough three-set match. After the match, a fan jumped onto the court trying to engage Bondarenko, but ended up getting arrested. In the third round, Bondarenko lost to world No. 48, Anastasija Sevastova.

At the Japan Women's Open, she lost in the first round to world No. 75, Louisa Chirico in straight sets. Bondarenko qualified for the Pan Pacific Open defeating eighth seed Aleksandra Krunić in the final round of qualifying. In the first round, she lost to Anastasija Sevastova in straight sets. At the Wuhan Open, Bondarenko lost in the second round of qualifying to sixth seed Alizé Cornet. Her final tournament of the year was the China Open. She lost in the first round of qualifying to Han Xinyun, in three sets.

Bondarenko ended the year ranked No. 70.

=== 2017: First WTA singles title since 2008 ===
Bondarenko began the season by playing qualifying at the Brisbane International. She made it to the final round of qualifying where she lost to Asia Muhammad. However, she made it into the main draw as a lucky loser. In the first round, she lost in a thriller to eighth seed Roberta Vinci. Next, Bondarenko played qualifying at the Sydney International where she qualified defeating Naomi Broady in the final round. In the main draw, she was defeated by fellow qualifier Christina McHale. At the Australian Open, Bondarenko lost in the first round to 21st seed Caroline Garcia.

In February, Bondarenko competed at the Qatar Ladies Open. She lost in the second round of qualifying to Christina McHale. At the Dubai Championships, she won her first singles match of the year defeating qualifier Aryna Sabalenka in the first round. In the second round, Bondarenko won when fifth seed Garbiñe Muguruza retired at 4–1 in the opening set due to a left achilles injury. In the third round, she lost to tenth seed and eventual finalist Caroline Wozniacki. Playing at the Abierto Mexicano, Bondarenko was defeated in the first round by Julia Görges. At Indian Wells, she lost in the first round to Wang Qiang. In Miami, she won her first-round match over wildcard Paula Badosa. In the second round, she lost a tough three-set match to 26th seed Mirjana Lučić-Baroni.

Bondarenko began her clay-court season at the Charleston Open. She lost in the second round to seventh seed Kiki Bertens. In Stuttgart at the Porsche Grand Prix, Bondarenko was defeated in the first round of qualifying by Anett Kontaveit. At the Morocco Open, Bondarenko lost in the second round to seventh seed Lauren Davis. In Madrid, Bondarenko was defeated in the first round of qualifying by Océane Dodin. At the Italian Open, she lost in the first round of qualifying to Varvara Lepchenko. Playing in her final tournament before the French Open at the Nürnberger Versicherungscup, she was defeated in the first round of qualifying by Alexandra Cadanțu.

In September at the Tashkent Open, she won her first WTA Tour singles title since 2008, defeating Tímea Babos in the final.

=== 2020 ===
In January, Bondarenko kicked off her 2020 season at the Shenzhen Open. She reached the quarterfinal round where she lost to Kristýna Plíšková. At the Australian Open, she was defeated in the first round by Australian wildcard Arina Rodionova.

In February, Bondarenko competed at the Thailand Open where she lost in the first round to fifth seed and eventual champion, Magda Linette. At the Mexican Open, she was defeated in the second round by seventh seed and eventual champion, Heather Watson.

=== 2023-2024 ===
Ranked No. 267, she qualified for the main draw of the WTA 500 2023 Zhengzhou Open, losing in the first round to Zheng Qinwen.

Ranked No. 323, at the age of 38, she qualified for the main draw of the WTA 500, the 2024 Monterrey Open, but was defeated by lucky loser Lina Glushko in the first round.

== Grand Slam performance timelines ==
Key
W	F	SF	QF	#R	RR	Q#	P#	DNQ	A	Z#	PO	G	S	B	NMS	NTI	P	NH

(W) winner; (F) finalist; (SF) semifinalist; (QF) quarterfinalist; (#R) rounds 4, 3, 2, 1; (RR) round-robin stage; (Q#) qualification round; (P#) preliminary round; (DNQ) did not qualify; (A) absent; (Z#) Davis/Fed Cup Zonal Group (with number indication) or (PO) play-off; (G) gold, (S) silver or (B) bronze Olympic/Paralympic medal; (NMS) not a Masters tournament; (NTI) not a Tier I tournament; (P) postponed; (NH) not held; (SR) strike rate (events won / competed); (W–L) win–loss record.
To avoid confusion and double counting, these charts are updated at the conclusion of a tournament or when the player's participation has ended.

=== Singles ===
Tournament	2005	2006	2007	2008	2009	2010	2011	2012	2013	2014	2015	2016	2017	2018	2019	2020	2021	2022	SR	W-L	Win%
Australian Open	A	Q3	Q1	1R	3R	2R	1R	1R	A	A	Q2	3R	1R	3R	A	1R	A	Q2	0 / 9	7–9	44%
French Open	A	A	2R	1R	3R	2R	1R	1R	A	Q1	Q3	2R	1R	1R	A	A	Q1	A	0 / 9	5–9	36%
Wimbledon	1R	2R	1R	2R	2R	1R	3R	2R	A	A	Q2	1R	1R	1R	A	NH	Q2	A	0 / 11	6–11	35%
US Open	Q2	Q1	2R	1R	QF	2R	2R	1R	A	A	2R	3R	Q2	1R	A	2R	A	A	0 / 10	11–10	52%
Win–loss	0–1	1–1	2–3	1–4	9–4	3–4	3–4	1–4	0–0	0–0	1–1	5–4	0–3	2–4	0–0	1–2	0–0	0–0	0 / 39	29–39	43%

=== Doubles ===
Tournament	2006	2007	2008	2009	2010	2011	2012	...	2015	2016	2017	2018	2019	2020	2021	2022	W–L
Australian Open	A	2R	W	1R	1R	1R	1R		A	2R	1R	2R	A	1R	2R	A	11–10
French Open	A	2R	SF	2R	QF	1R	2R		A	1R	1R	2R	A	1R	A	A	12–10
Wimbledon	1R	2R	A	1R	1R	A	1R		A	1R	2R	1R	A	NH	A	A	2–8
US Open	2R	2R	3R	1R	2R	2R	1R		1R	1R	1R	1R	A	A	1R	A	6–12
Win–loss	1–2	4–4	14–2	1–4	5–4	0–3	1–4		0–1	1–4	1–4	2–4	0–0	0–2	1–2	0–0	31–40

== Junior Grand Slam finals ==
=== Singles: 1 (title) ===
Result	Year	Championship	Surface	Opponent	Score
Win	2004	Wimbledon	Grass	(Serbia and Montenegro) Ana Ivanovic	6–4, 6–7^{(2–7)}, 6–2

== Olympic Games ==
=== Doubles: 1 (runner–up) ===
Result	Year	Location	Surface	Partner	Opponents	Score
4th place	2008	Beijing	Hard	(Ukraine) Alona Bondarenko	(China) Zheng Jie (China) Yan Zi	2–6, 2–6

== WTA Tour finals ==
=== Singles: 2 (2 titles) ===
Legend Grand Slam WTA 1000 WTA 500 WTA 250 (2–0)	Finals by surface Hard (1–0) Grass (1–0) Clay (0–0) Carpet (0–0)

Result	W–L	Date	Tournament	Tier	Surface	Opponent	Score
Win	1–0	Jun 2008	Birmingham Classic, UK	Tier III (Note: The WTA Tier III tournaments, WTA Tier IV tournaments and WTA Tier V tournaments were reclassified as WTA International tournaments in 2009 and later as WTA 250 tournaments in 2021.)	Grass	(Belgium) Yanina Wickmayer	7–6^{(9–7)}, 3–6, 7–6^{(7–4)}
Win	2–0	Sep 2017	Tashkent Open, Uzbekistan	International	Hard	(Hungary) Tímea Babos	6–4, 6–4

=== Doubles: 11 (4 titles, 7 runner-ups) ===
Legend Grand Slam (1–0) WTA 1000 (0–0) WTA 500 (1–1) WTA 250 (2–6)	Finals by surface Hard (2–4) Grass (0–0) Clay (1–3) Carpet (1–0)

Result	W–L	Date	Tournament	Tier	Surface	Partner	Opponents	Score
Win	1–0	Jan 2008	Australian Open	Grand Slam	Hard	(Ukraine) Alona Bondarenko	(Belarus) Victoria Azarenka (Israel) Shahar Pe'er	2–6, 6–1, 6–4
Win	2–0	Feb 2008	Paris Indoor, France	Tier II (Note: The WTA Tier II tournaments were reclassified as WTA Premier tournaments in 2009 and later as WTA 500 tournaments in 2021.)	Carpet (i)	(Ukraine) Alona Bondarenko	(Czech Republic) Vladimíra Uhlířová (Czech Republic) Eva Hrdinová	6–1, 6–4
Loss	2–1	Jan 2009	Hobart International, Australia	International	Hard	(Ukraine) Alona Bondarenko	(Argentina) Gisela Dulko (Italy) Flavia Pennetta	2–6, 6–7^{(4–7)}
Loss	2–2	Jul 2009	Budapest Grand Prix, Hungary	International	Clay	(Ukraine) Alona Bondarenko	(Russia) Alisa Kleybanova (Romania) Monica Niculescu	4–6, 6–7^{(5–7)}
Win	3–2	Jul 2009	Prague Open, Czech Republic	International	Clay	(Ukraine) Alona Bondarenko	(Czech Republic) Iveta Benešová (Czech Republic) Barbora Strýcová	6–1, 6–2
Loss	3–3	Jan 2011	Hobart International, Australia	International	Hard	(Latvia) Līga Dekmeijere	(Italy) Sara Errani (Italy) Roberta Vinci	3–6, 5–7
Loss	3–4	May 2015	Prague Open, Czech Republic	International	Clay	(Czech Republic) Eva Hrdinová	(Switzerland) Belinda Bencic (Czech Republic) Kateřina Siniaková	2–6, 2–6
Loss	3–5	Aug 2016	Connecticut Open, United States	Premier	Hard	(Chinese Taipei) Chuang Chia-jung	(India) Sania Mirza (Romania) Monica Niculescu	5–7, 4–6
Loss	3–6	Feb 2020	Mexican Open	International	Hard	(Canada) Sharon Fichman	(United States) Desirae Krawczyk (Mexico) Giuliana Olmos	3–6, 6–7^{(5–7)}
Win	4–6	Mar 2020	Monterrey Open, Mexico	International	Hard	(Canada) Sharon Fichman	(Japan) Miyu Kato (China) Wang Yafan	4–6, 6–3, [10–7]
Loss	4–7	Jul 2021	Poland Open	WTA 250	Clay	(Poland) Katarzyna Piter	(Kazakhstan) Anna Danilina (Belarus) Lidziya Marozava	3–6, 2–6

== WTA 125 finals ==
=== Singles: 1 (runner-up) ===
Result	W–L	Date	Tournament	Surface	Opponent	Score
Loss	0–1	Mar 2018	Indian Wells Challenger, United States	Hard	(Italy) Sara Errani	4–6, 2–6

== ITF Circuit finals ==
=== Singles: 10 (6 titles, 4 runner–ups) ===
Legend $75,000 tournaments (1–0) $50,000 tournaments (1–0) $40,000 tournaments (1–0) $25,000 tournaments (2–2) $10,000 tournaments (1–2)	Finals by surface Hard (6–1) Clay (0–3)

Result	W–L	Date	Tournament	Tier	Surface	Opponent	Score
Win	1–0	Dec 2002	ITF Pune, India	10,000	Hard	(Turkey) İpek Şenoğlu	6–1, 6–1
Loss	1–1	Aug 2003	ITF Gdynia, Poland	10,000	Clay	(Austria) Daniela Kix	7–5, 5–7, 3–6
Loss	1–2	Aug 2003	ITF Oulu, Finland	10,000	Clay	(Australia) Monique Adamczak	3–6, 4–6
Loss	1–3	Apr 2004	ITF Bari, Italy	25,000	Clay	(Ukraine) Alona Bondarenko	6–2, 2–6, 4–6
Win	2–3	Dec 2006	Dubai Tennis Challenge, UAE	75,000	Hard	(Belarus) Ekaterina Dzehalevich	6–1, 6–3
Win	3–3	Nov 2010	ITF Bratislava, Slovakia	25,000	Hard (i)	(Russia) Evgeniya Rodina	7–6^{(7–3)}, 6–2
Win	4–3	Oct 2014	ITF Monterrey, Mexico	25,000	Hard	(Croatia) Ana Vrljić	6–1, 7–5
Win	5–3	Oct 2014	Tennis Classic of Macon, United States	50,000	Hard	(United States) Grace Min	6–4, 7–5
Loss	5–4	Sep 2022	ITF Leiria, Portugal	25,000	Hard	(Serbia) Natalija Stevanović	6–2, 4–6, 4–6
Win	6–4	Jan 2023	ITF Nonthaburi, Thailand	40,000	Hard	Valeria Savinykh	6–2, 6–3

=== Doubles: 17 (6 titles, 11 runner–ups) ===
Legend $100,000 tournaments (0–3) $75,000 tournaments (0–1) $50/60,000 tournaments (3–2) $40,000 tournaments (0–2) $25,000 tournaments (2–0) $10,000 tournaments (1–3)	Finals by surface Hard (4–7) Clay (2–4)

Result	W–L	Date	Tournament	Tier	Surface	Partner	Opponents	Score
Loss	0–1	May 2001	ITF Olecko, Poland	10,000	Clay	(Ukraine) Valeria Bondarenko	(Slovakia) Martina Babáková (Czech Republic) Lenka Snajdrova	2–6, 2–6
Loss	0–2	Sep 2001	ITF Mostar, BiH	10,000	Clay	(Slovenia) Mojca Mileta	(Germany) Maria Jedlickova (Slovakia) Lenka Tvarošková	4–6, 4–6
Win	1–2	Dec 2002	Pune Championships, India	10,000	Hard	(Uzbekistan) Akgul Amanmuradova	(India) Sania Mirza (India) Radhika Tulpule	6–3, 7–6^{(7–1)}
Loss	1–3	Aug 2003	ITF Oulu, Finland	10,000	Clay	(Latvia) Irina Kuzmina-Rimša	(Austria) Nicole Melch (Austria) Yvonne Meusburger	3–6, 6–4, 1–6
Loss	1–4	Nov 2005	ITF Deauville, France	50,000	Clay (i)	(Ukraine) Alona Bondarenko	(France) Stéphanie Cohen-Aloro (Tunisia) Selima Sfar	3–6, 1–6
Win	2–4	Mar 2006	ITF Orange, United States	50,000	Hard	(Ukraine) Alona Bondarenko	(Canada) Stéphanie Dubois (United States) Lilia Osterloh	6–2, 6–4
Loss	2–5	Dec 2006	Dubai Tennis Challenge, UAE	75,000	Hard	(Ukraine) Valeria Bondarenko	(Croatia) Jelena Kostanić Tošić (Bosnia and Herzegovina) Mervana Jugić-Salkić	3–6, 0–6
Loss	2–6	Sep 2007	ITF Kharkiv, Ukraine	100,000	Hard	(Ukraine) Alona Bondarenko	(Ukraine) Mariya Koryttseva (Belarus) Darya Kustova	6–7^{(8)}, 3–6
Win	3–6	Jun 2014	ITF Kristinehamn, Sweden	25,000	Clay	(Sweden) Cornelia Lister	(Belgium) Ysaline Bonaventure (Poland) Sandra Zaniewska	w/o
Loss	3–7	Oct 2014	Abierto Tampico, Mexico	50,000	Hard	(Russia) Valeria Savinykh	(Croatia) Petra Martić (United States) Maria Sanchez	6–3, 3–6, [2–10]
Win	4–7	Feb 2022	ITF Cancún, Mexico	25,000	Hard	(Canada) Carol Zhao	(Sweden) Jacqueline Cabaj Awad (Israel) Lina Glushko	7–5, 6–7^{(5)}, [10–7]
Win	5–7	Aug 2022	Lexington Challenger, United States	60,000	Hard	(Indonesia) Aldila Sutjiadi	(United States) Jada Hart (United States) Dalayna Hewitt	7–5, 6–3
Win	6–7	Nov 2022	Barranquilla Open, Colombia	60,000	Clay	(Hungary) Tímea Babos	(Brazil) Carolina Alves (Ukraine) Valeriya Strakhova	3–6, 7–5, [10–7]
Loss	6–8	Dec 2022	Dubai Tennis Challenge, UAE	100,000+H	Hard	(Poland) Magdalena Fręch	(Hungary) Tímea Babos (France) Kristina Mladenovic	1–6, 3–6
Loss	6–9	Jan 2023	ITF Nonthaburi, Thailand	60,000	Hard	(Japan) Hiroko Kuwata	(Chinese Taipei) Liang En-shuo (China) Ma Yexin	0–6, 3–6
Loss	6–10	Jun 2023	ITF La Marsa, Tunisia	40,000	Hard	(Japan) Hiroko Kuwata	Maria Kozyreva (China) Wei Sijia	7–5, 4–6, [6-10]
Loss	6–11	Oct 2023	ITF Shenzhen, China	100,000	Hard	(Hungary) Timea Babos	(France) Kristina Mladenovic (Japan) Moyuka Uchijima	2–6, 5–7

== Head-to-head record ==
=== Top 10 wins ===
#	Player	Rank	Event	Surface	Rd	Score
2007
1.	(Serbia) Ana Ivanovic	No. 5	Stuttgart Open	Hard	2R	6–2, 1–6, 6–3
2009
2.	(Poland) Agnieszka Radwańska	No. 10	Australian Open	Hard	1R	7–6^{(9–7)}, 4–6, 6–1
3.	(United States) Venus Williams	No. 3	Canadian Open	Hard	2R	1–6, 7–5, 6–4
4.	(Russia) Elena Dementieva	No. 4	Pan Pacific Open	Hard	2R	6–2, 6–7^{(3–7)}, 6–1
2010
5.	(China) Li Na	No. 9	US Open	Hard	1R	2–6, 6–4, 6–2
2012
6.	(Italy) Sara Errani	No. 10	Rosmalen Open	Grass	1R	5–7, 6–3, 6–4
2016
7.	(Italy) Roberta Vinci	No. 7	French Open	Clay	1R	6–1, 6–3
2017
8.	(Spain) Garbiñe Muguruza	No. 7	Dubai Championships	Hard	2R	4–1 ret.
