= 2025 Hobart International =

- Date: 6–11 January 2025
- Edition: 30th
- Category: WTA 250
- Draw: 32S / 16D
- Prize money: $275,094
- Surface: Hard
- Location: Hobart, Australia
- Venue: Hobart International Tennis Centre

Champions

Singles
- (United States) McCartney Kessler

Doubles
- (China) Jiang Xinyu / (Chinese Taipei) Wu Fang-hsien
| ← 2024 · | Hobart International | · 2026 → |

The 2025 Hobart International was a professional women's tennis tournament played on outdoor hard courts. It was the 30th edition of the Hobart International and part of the WTA 250 tournaments of the 2025 WTA Tour. It took place at the Hobart International Tennis Centre in Hobart, Australia from 6 to 11 January 2025.

== Champions ==
=== Singles ===
- (United States) McCartney Kessler def. (Belgium) Elise Mertens 6–4, 3–6, 6–0

=== Doubles ===
- (China) Jiang Xinyu / (Chinese Taipei) Wu Fang-hsien def. (Romania) Monica Niculescu / (Hungary) Fanny Stollár 6–1, 7–6^{(8–6)}

== Singles main draw entrants ==
=== Seeds ===
| Country | Player | Rank^{1} | Seed |
|---|---|---|---|
| UKR | Dayana Yastremska | 33 | 1 |
| BEL | Elise Mertens | 34 | 2 |
| USA | Amanda Anisimova | 36 | 3 |
| POL | Magda Linette | 38 | 4 |
| NZL | Lulu Sun | 40 | 5 |
| ARM | Elina Avanesyan | 43 | 6 |
| SVK | Rebecca Šramková | 46 | 7 |
| CHN | Yuan Yue | 49 | 8 |

- ^{1} Rankings as of 30 December 2024.

=== Other entrants ===
The following players received wildcards into the singles main draw:

- (Australia) Maya Joint
- (United States) Sofia Kenin
- (Australia) Daria Saville
- (United States) Sloane Stephens

The following players received entry from the qualifying draw:

- (Hungary) Anna Bondár
- (Argentina) María Lourdes Carlé
- (United States) Ann Li
- (Belgium) Greet Minnen
- (Spain) Nuria Párrizas Díaz
- (China) Wang Xiyu

The following players received entry as lucky losers:

- (Italy) Lucia Bronzetti
- (Mexico) Renata Zarazúa

=== Withdrawals ===
- (Ukraine) Anhelina Kalinina → replaced by (Mexico) Renata Zarazúa
- (Denmark) Clara Tauson → replaced by (Italy) Lucia Bronzetti

== Doubles main draw entrants ==
=== Seeds ===
| Country | Player | Country | Player | Rank^{1} | Seed |
|---|---|---|---|---|---|
| SVK | Tereza Mihalíková | GBR | Olivia Nicholls | 80 | 1 |
| NOR | Ulrikke Eikeri | JPN | Makoto Ninomiya | 89 | 2 |
| USA | Sofia Kenin | POL | Magda Linette | 98 | 3 |
| CHN | Jiang Xinyu | TPE | Wu Fang-hsien | 98 | 4 |

- ^{1} Rankings as of 30 December 2024.

=== Other entrants ===
The following pairs received wildcards into the doubles main draw:

- (Australia) Alexandra Bozovic / (Australia) Kaylah McPhee
- (Australia) Talia Gibson / (Australia) Maya Joint
