= 2024 Hobart International – Singles =

Women's tennis tournament in Australia

Singles
- 2024 Hobart International

Final
- Champion: (United States) Emma Navarro
- Runner-up: (Belgium) Elise Mertens
- Score: 6–1, 4–6, 7–5

Details
- Draw: 32 (4 Q / 3 WC )
- Seeds: 8

Events
Singles	Doubles
← 2023 ·	Hobart International	· 2025 →

Emma Navarro defeated Elise Mertens in the final, 6–1, 4–6, 7–5 to win the singles tennis title at the 2024 Hobart International. It was her first WTA Tour title.

Lauren Davis was the reigning champion, but did not participate this year due to injury.

== Seeds ==
1. (Belgium) Elise Mertens (final)
2. (United States) Emma Navarro (champion)
3. (China) Zhu Lin (quarterfinals)
4. (China) Wang Xinyu (second round)
5. (Czech Republic) Marie Bouzková (second round)
6. (United States) Sofia Kenin (second round)
7. (Czech Republic) Linda Nosková (withdrew)
8. (France) Varvara Gracheva (second round)
9. (Germany) Tatjana Maria (second round)

== Draw ==
=== Key ===
- Q = Qualifier
- WC = Wild card
- LL = Lucky loser
- Alt = Alternate
- ITF = ITF entry
- PR = Protected ranking
- SR = Special ranking
- SE = Special exempt
- JE = Junior exempt
- JR = Junior Accelerator Programme entrant
- CO = College Accelerator Programme entrant
- NG = Next Gen Accelerator Program entrant
- w/o = Walkover
- r = Retired
- d = Defaulted

=== Finals ===
Semifinals
1	(Belgium) Elise Mertens	6	4	7
WC	(Australia) Daria Saville	4	6	5
Q	(China) Yuan Yue	4	3
2	(United States) Emma Navarro	6	6

Final
1	(Belgium) Elise Mertens	1	6	5
2	(United States) Emma Navarro	6	4	7

=== Top half ===
First round
1	(Belgium) E Mertens	6	6
(United States) D Collins	2	3
Q	(Slovakia) AK Schmiedlová	1	7^{7}	7
Q	(Colombia) C Osorio	6	6^{4}	5
LL	(Czech Republic) L Fruhvirtová	3	7	3
(Netherlands) A Rus	6	5	6
(United States) P Stearns	6^{3}	6	5
8	(France) V Gracheva	7^{7}	3	7
3	(China) L Zhu	7	6
(Italy) L Bronzetti	5	1
(Egypt) M Sherif	1	4
(United States) C Dolehide	6	6
A Blinkova	6	4	4
WC	(Australia) D Saville	3	6	6
(Belgium) G Minnen	3	3
6/WC	(United States) S Kenin	6	6

Second round
1	(Belgium) E Mertens	6	6
Q	(Slovakia) AK Schmiedlová	2	3
(Netherlands) A Rus	6	6
8	(France) V Gracheva	2	3
3	(China) L Zhu	5	6	6
(United States) C Dolehide	7	3	4
WC	(Australia) D Saville	7^{7}	6
6/WC	(United States) S Kenin	6^{3}	1

Quarterfinals
1	(Belgium) E Mertens	7	6
(Netherlands) A Rus	5	0
3	(China) L Zhu	6	1	4
WC	(Australia) D Saville	3	6	6

Semifinals
1	(Belgium) E Mertens	6	4	7
WC	(Australia) D Saville	4	6	5

=== Bottom half ===
First round
5	(Czech Republic) M Bouzková	6	6
Q	(Switzerland) V Golubic	2	4
Q	(Kazakhstan) Y Putintseva	0	7	7^{7}
(Italy) E Cocciaretto	6	5	6^{4}
Q	(China) Y Yuan	6	3	7^{7}
(United States) S Stephens	4	6	6^{5}
WC	(Australia) O Gadecki	3	6	3
4	(China) Xin Wang	6	3	6
9	(Germany) T Maria	6	4
LL	(Argentina) N Podoroska	1	3^{r}
LL	(Bulgaria) V Tomova	6	6
(Italy) M Trevisan	3	3
Q	(Poland) M Fręch	0	6	6
(Spain) S Sorribes Tormo	6	1	4
(France) C Burel	6	3	3
2	(United States) E Navarro	4	6	6

Second round
5	(Czech Republic) M Bouzková	4	6	3
Q	(Kazakhstan) Y Putintseva	6	1	6
Q	(China) Y Yuan	7	6
4	(China) Xin Wang	5	3
9	(Germany) T Maria	0	1
LL	(Bulgaria) V Tomova	6	6
Q	(Poland) M Fręch	3	3
2	(United States) E Navarro	6	6

Quarterfinals
Q	(Kazakhstan) Y Putintseva	5	6^{4}
Q	(China) Y Yuan	7	7^{7}
LL	(Bulgaria) V Tomova	6	3	2
2	(United States) E Navarro	4	6	6

Semifinals
Q	(China) Y Yuan	4	3
2	(United States) E Navarro	6	6

== Qualifying ==
=== Seeds ===
1. (Argentina) Nadia Podoroska (qualifying competition, lucky loser)
2. (Kazakhstan) Yulia Putintseva (qualified)
3. (Belgium) Yanina Wickmayer (first round)
4. (Poland) Magdalena Fręch (qualified)
5. (China) Wang Xiyu (special exempt to main draw, withdrew)
6. (Slovakia) Anna Karolína Schmiedlová (qualified)
7. (Bulgaria) Viktoriya Tomova (qualifying competition, lucky loser)
8. (China) Yuan Yue (qualified)
9. (Colombia) Camila Osorio (qualified)
10. (Switzerland) Viktorija Golubic (qualified)
11. (Romania) Jaqueline Cristian (first round)
12. (Czech Republic) Linda Fruhvirtová (qualifying competition, lucky loser)

=== Qualifiers ===
1. (China) Yuan Yue
2. (Kazakhstan) Yulia Putintseva
3. (Colombia) Camila Osorio
4. (Poland) Magdalena Fręch
5. (Switzerland) Viktorija Golubic
6. (Slovakia) Anna Karolína Schmiedlová

=== Lucky losers ===
1. (Argentina) Nadia Podoroska
2. (Bulgaria) Viktoriya Tomova
3. (Czech Republic) Linda Fruhvirtová

=== Qualifying draw ===
==== First qualifier ====
First round
1	(Argentina) Nadia Podoroska	6	6
WC	(Australia) Elysia Bolton	2	2
Diana Shnaider	5	6	4
8	(China) Yuan Yue	7	4	6

Qualifying competition
1	(Argentina) Nadia Podoroska	6	4	6^{2}
8	(China) Yuan Yue	4	6	7^{7}

==== Second qualifier ====
First round
2	(Kazakhstan) Yulia Putintseva	6	6
(Japan) Nao Hibino	2	2
(Australia) Kimberly Birrell	6	6
11	(Romania) Jaqueline Cristian	4	4

Qualifying competition
2	(Kazakhstan) Yulia Putintseva	6	6
(Australia) Kimberly Birrell	3	4

==== Third qualifier ====
First round
3	(Belgium) Yanina Wickmayer	6	4	2
WC	(Chinese Taipei) Chan Hao-ching	3	6	6
(United Kingdom) Jodie Burrage	3	4
9	(Colombia) Camila Osorio	6	6

Qualifying competition
WC	(Chinese Taipei) Chan Hao-ching	4	1
9	(Colombia) Camila Osorio	6	6

==== Fourth qualifier ====
First round
4	(Poland) Magdalena Fręch	6	6
(United Kingdom) Amarni Banks	3	1
(United States) Kayla Day	6	0	3
7	(Bulgaria) Viktoriya Tomova	3	6	6

Qualifying competition
4	(Poland) Magdalena Fręch	6	6
7	(Bulgaria) Viktoriya Tomova	1	3

==== Fifth qualifier ====
First round
Alt	Irina Khromacheva	2	3
(China) Bai Zhuoxuan	6	6
WC	(Australia) Alexandra Bozovic	0	1
10	(Switzerland) Viktorija Golubic	6	6

Qualifying competition
(China) Bai Zhuoxuan	1	4
10	(Switzerland) Viktorija Golubic	6	6

==== Sixth qualifier ====
First round
6	(Slovakia) Anna Karolína Schmiedlová	6	6
(Slovenia) Tamara Zidanšek	1	3
WC	(Australia) Alana Parnaby	3	0
12	(Czech Republic) Linda Fruhvirtová	6	6

Qualifying competition
6	(Slovakia) Anna Karolína Schmiedlová	6	6
12	(Czech Republic) Linda Fruhvirtová	4	2
