= 2024 Hobart International =

- Date: 8–13 January 2024
- Edition: 29th
- Category: WTA 250
- Draw: 32S / 16D
- Surface: Hard
- Location: Hobart, Australia
- Venue: Hobart International Tennis Centre

Champions

Singles
- (United States) Emma Navarro

Doubles
- (Chinese Taipei) Chan Hao-ching / (Mexico) Giuliana Olmos
← 2023 ·	Hobart International	· 2025 →

The 2024 Hobart International was a professional women's tennis tournament played on outdoor hard courts. It was the 29th edition of the Hobart International and part of the WTA 250 tournaments of the 2024 WTA Tour. It took place at the Hobart International Tennis Centre in Hobart, Australia from 8 to 13 January 2024.

== Champions ==
=== Singles ===
- (United States) Emma Navarro def. (Belgium) Elise Mertens, 6–1, 4–6, 7–5

=== Doubles ===
- (Chinese Taipei) Chan Hao-ching / (Mexico) Giuliana Olmos def. (China) Guo Hanyu / (China) Jiang Xinyu 6–3, 6–3

== Singles main draw entrants ==
=== Seeds ===
Country	Player	Rank^{1}	Seed
BEL	Elise Mertens	30	1
USA	Emma Navarro	31	2
CHN	Zhu Lin	33	3
CHN	Wang Xinyu	35	4
CZE	Marie Bouzková	36	5
USA	Sofia Kenin	37	6
~~CZE~~	~~Linda Nosková~~	~~40~~	~~7~~
FRA	Varvara Gracheva	42	8
GER	Tatjana Maria	43	9

- ^{1} Rankings as of 1 January 2024.

=== Other entrants ===
The following players received wildcards into the singles main draw:

- (Australia) Olivia Gadecki
- (United States) Sofia Kenin
- (Australia) Daria Saville

The following player received entry as a special exempt:

- ~~(China) Wang Xiyu~~

The following players received entry from the qualifying draw:

- (Poland) Magdalena Fręch
- (Switzerland) Viktorija Golubic
- (Colombia) Camila Osorio
- (Kazakhstan) Yulia Putintseva
- (Slovakia) Anna Karolína Schmiedlová
- (China) Yuan Yue

The following players received entry as lucky losers:

- (Czech Republic) Linda Fruhvirtová
- (Argentina) Nadia Podoroska
- (Bulgaria) Viktoriya Tomova

=== Withdrawals ===
- (Spain) Rebeka Masarova → replaced by (Bulgaria) Viktoriya Tomova
- (Czech Republic) Linda Nosková → replaced by (Argentina) Nadia Podoroska
- (China) Wang Xiyu → replaced by (Czech Republic) Linda Fruhvirtová

== Doubles main draw entrants ==
=== Seeds ===
Country	Player	Country	Player	Rank^{1}	Seed
USA	Desirae Krawczyk	JPN	Ena Shibahara	30	1
TPE	Chan Hao-ching	MEX	Giuliana Olmos	44	2
JPN	Eri Hozumi	JPN	Makoto Ninomiya	96	3
KAZ	Anna Danilina	UKR	Nadiia Kichenok	102	4

- ^{1} Rankings as of 1 January 2024.

=== Other entrants ===
The following pairs received wildcards into the doubles main draw:

- (Australia) Kimberly Birrell / (Australia) Olivia Gadecki
- (Australia) Elysia Bolton / (Australia) Alexandra Bozovic
