= 2025 Hobart International – Doubles =

Doubles
- 2025 Hobart International

Final
- Champions: (China) Jiang Xinyu (Chinese Taipei) Wu Fang-hsien
- Runners-up: (Romania) Monica Niculescu (Hungary) Fanny Stollár
- Score: 6–1, 7–6^{(8–6)}

Events
| Singles | Doubles |
| ← 2024 · | Hobart International | · 2026 → |

Jiang Xinyu and Wu Fang-hsien defeated Monica Niculescu and Fanny Stollár in the final, 6–1, 7–6^{(8–6)} to win the doubles tennis title at the 2025 Hobart International. It was the pair's second consecutive doubles title together, having already won Auckland in the previous week.

Chan Hao-ching and Giuliana Olmos were the reigning champions, but both players chose to compete at Adelaide instead with different partners.

== Seeds ==
1. (Slovakia) Tereza Mihalíková / (United Kingdom) Olivia Nicholls (semifinals)
2. (Norway) Ulrikke Eikeri / (Japan) Makoto Ninomiya (quarterfinals)
3. (United States) Sofia Kenin / (Poland) Magda Linette (semifinals, withdrew)
4. (China) Jiang Xinyu / (Chinese Taipei) Wu Fang-hsien (champions)

== Draw ==
=== Key ===
- Q = Qualifier
- WC = Wild card
- LL = Lucky loser
- Alt = Alternate
- ITF = ITF entry
- PR = Protected ranking
- SR = Special ranking
- SE = Special exempt
- JE = Junior exempt
- JR = Junior Accelerator Programme entrant
- CO = College Accelerator Programme entrant
- NG = Next Gen Accelerator Program entrant
- w/o = Walkover
- r = Retired
- d = Defaulted

=== Draw ===
First round
1 | (Slovakia) T Mihalíková (United Kingdom) O Nicholls | 6^{3} | 7^{7} | [10]
(United States) Q Gleason (Belgium) K Zimmermann | 7^{7} | 6^{4} | [6]
(Japan) M Kato (Mexico) R Zarazúa | 4 | 4
A Blinkova (Egypt) M Sherif | 6 | 6
4 | (China) X Jiang (Chinese Taipei) F-h Wu | 6 | 6
(United Kingdom) E Appleton (Brazil) I Martins | 4 | 2
WC | (Australia) T Gibson (Australia) M Joint | 6 | 6
WC | (Australia) A Bozovic (Australia) K McPhee | 3 | 1
(United Kingdom) T Moore (Bulgaria) V Tomova | 5 | 3
(Italy) A Moratelli (Poland) K Piter | 7 | 6
(Georgia (country)) O Kalashnikova (China) Q Tang | 6^{5} | 3
3 | (United States) S Kenin (Poland) M Linette | 7^{7} | 6
(United States) S Santamaria (United States) S Stephens | 7 | 3 | [4]
(Romania) M Niculescu (Hungary) F Stollár | 5 | 6 | [10]
(United Kingdom) M Lumsden (Czech Republic) A Sisková | 0 | 7 | [3]
2 | (Norway) U Eikeri (Japan) M Ninomiya | 6 | 5 | [10]

Quarterfinals
1 | (Slovakia) T Mihalíková (United Kingdom) O Nicholls | 2
A Blinkova (Egypt) M Sherif | 0^{r}
4 | (China) X Jiang (Chinese Taipei) F-h Wu | 6 | 6
WC | (Australia) T Gibson (Australia) M Joint | 4 | 2
(Italy) A Moratelli (Poland) K Piter | 4 | 5
3 | (United States) S Kenin (Poland) M Linette | 6 | 7
(Romania) M Niculescu (Hungary) F Stollár | 6 | 7^{11}
2 | (Norway) U Eikeri (Japan) M Ninomiya | 1 | 6^{9}

Semifinals
1 | (Slovakia) T Mihalíková (United Kingdom) O Nicholls | 4 | 7 | [11]
4 | (China) X Jiang (Chinese Taipei) F-h Wu | 6 | 5 | [13]
3 | (United States) S Kenin (Poland) M Linette
(Romania) M Niculescu (Hungary) F Stollár | w/o

Final
4 | (China) X Jiang (Chinese Taipei) F-h Wu | 6 | 7^{8}
(Romania) M Niculescu (Hungary) F Stollár | 1 | 6^{6}
