= 2023 Hobart International – Singles =

Singles
- 2023 Hobart International

Final
- Champion: (United States) Lauren Davis
- Runner-up: (Italy) Elisabetta Cocciaretto
- Score: 7–6^{(7–0)}, 6–2

Details
- Draw: 32 (4 Q / 3 WC )
- Seeds: 8

Events
Singles	Doubles
← 2020 ·	Hobart International	· 2024 →

Lauren Davis defeated Elisabetta Cocciaretto in the final, 7–6^{(7–0)}, 6–2 to win the singles tennis title at the 2023 Hobart International. She won the title as a qualifier. It was her first WTA Tour title since 2017, and she did not drop a set en route, including in the qualifying rounds.

Elena Rybakina was the reigning champion from when the event was last held in 2020, but chose to compete in Adelaide instead.

== Seeds ==
1. (Czech Republic) Marie Bouzková (second round)
2. (Belgium) Elise Mertens (first round)
3. (France) Alizé Cornet (first round)
4. (United States) Sloane Stephens (first round)
5. (Ukraine) Anhelina Kalinina (quarterfinals)
6. (United States) Bernarda Pera (quarterfinals)
7. (Poland) Magda Linette (first round)
8. (Kazakhstan) Yulia Putintseva (quarterfinals)

== Draw ==
=== Finals ===
Semifinals
Q	Anna Blinkova	3	3
Q	(United States) Lauren Davis	6	6
(Italy) Elisabetta Cocciaretto	7	4	6
WC	(United States) Sofia Kenin	5	6	1

Final
Q	(United States) Lauren Davis	7^{7}	6
(Italy) Elisabetta Cocciaretto	6^{0}	2

=== Top half ===
First Round
1	(Czech Republic) M Bouzková	7^{7}	6
PR	(Romania) J Cristian	6^{2}	3
(Italy) L Bronzetti	4	3
Q	A Blinkova	6	6
Q	(Spain) N Párrizas Díaz	2	6	6
(Egypt) M Sherif	6	2	1
(United States) C Liu	2	4
8	(Kazakhstan) Y Putintseva	6	6
4/WC	(United States) S Stephens	2	2
Q	(United States) L Davis	6	6
Q	(Slovenia) T Zidanšek	7^{7}	2	2
SE	(Belgium) Y Bonaventure	6^{2}	6	6
LL	(China) Xin Wang	6	7
WC	(Australia) O Gadecki	4	5
(Belgium) A Van Uytvanck	6	1	6
7	(Poland) M Linette	4	6	4

Second Round
1	(Czech Republic) M Bouzková	5	4
Q	A Blinkova	7	6
Q	(Spain) N Párrizas Díaz	2	3
8	(Kazakhstan) Y Putintseva	6	6
Q	(United States) L Davis	7^{7}	6
SE	(Belgium) Y Bonaventure	6^{1}	3
LL	(China) Xin Wang	7	4	6
(Belgium) A Van Uytvanck	5	6	3

Quarterfinals
Q	A Blinkova	6	6
8	(Kazakhstan) Y Putintseva	3	4
Q	(United States) L Davis	6	6
LL	(China) Xin Wang	3	3

Semifinals
Q	A Blinkova	3	3
Q	(United States) L Davis	6	6

=== Bottom half ===
First Round
6	(United States) B Pera	6	6
(United States) M Brengle	4	4
Q	(Czech Republic) T Martincová	7	1	2
PR	(Germany) L Siegemund	5	6	6
PR	(Romania) PM Țig	3	1
(Italy) J Paolini	6	6
(Italy) E Cocciaretto	6	6
3	(France) A Cornet	4	2
5	(Ukraine) A Kalinina	6	6
(Canada) R Marino	2	1
(Germany) T Maria	6	6
WC	(Australia) T Gibson	3	2
(China) L Zhu	2	2
WC	(United States) S Kenin	6	6
Q	(Belgium) M Zanevska	6	6
2	(Belgium) E Mertens	4	4

Second Round
6	(United States) B Pera	6	6^{3}	6
PR	(Germany) L Siegemund	4	7^{7}	4
(Italy) J Paolini	2	1
(Italy) E Cocciaretto	6	6
5	(Ukraine) A Kalinina	4	6	6
(Germany) T Maria	6	3	3
WC	(United States) S Kenin	6	6
Q	(Belgium) M Zanevska	2	3

Quarterfinals
6	(United States) B Pera	7	6^{8}	4
(Italy) E Cocciaretto	5	7^{10}	6
5	(Ukraine) A Kalinina	6	3	1
WC	(United States) S Kenin	4	6	6

Semifinals
(Italy) E Cocciaretto	7	4	6
WC	(United States) S Kenin	5	6	1

== Qualifying ==
=== Seeds ===
1. (Spain) Nuria Párrizas Díaz (qualified)
2. (Czech Republic) Tereza Martincová (qualified)
3. Anna Blinkova (qualified)
4. (Germany) Tamara Korpatsch (first round)
5. (Switzerland) Viktorija Golubic (first round)
6. (Colombia) Camila Osorio (withdrew)
7. (Belgium) Maryna Zanevska (qualified)
8. (Austria) Julia Grabher (first round)
9. (Slovenia) Tamara Zidanšek (qualified)
10. (China) Wang Xinyu (qualifying competition, lucky loser)
11. (United States) Lauren Davis (qualified)
12. (Hungary) Panna Udvardy (qualifying competition)

=== Qualifiers ===
1. (Spain) Nuria Párrizas Díaz
2. (Czech Republic) Tereza Martincová
3. Anna Blinkova
4. (Belgium) Maryna Zanevska
5. (United States) Lauren Davis
6. (Slovenia) Tamara Zidanšek

=== Lucky loser ===
1. (China) Wang Xinyu

=== Qualifying draw ===
==== First qualifier ====
First round
1	(Spain) Nuria Párrizas Díaz	4	6	6
(China) Yuan Yue	6	2	4
WC	(Australia) Lily Taylor	2	1
10	(China) Wang Xinyu	6	6

Qualifying competition
1	(Spain) Nuria Párrizas Díaz	7^{7}	6
10	(China) Wang Xinyu	6^{5}	1

==== Second qualifier ====
First round
2	(Czech Republic) Tereza Martincová	6	6
WC	(Australia) Emerson Jones	3	2
(Slovenia) Kaja Juvan	6	6
8	(Austria) Julia Grabher	2	1

Qualifying competition
2	(Czech Republic) Tereza Martincová	6	6
(Slovenia) Kaja Juvan	0	2

==== Third qualifier ====
First round
3	Anna Blinkova	6	6
Varvara Gracheva	1	1
WC	(Australia) Lily Fairclough	1	1
12	(Hungary) Panna Udvardy	6	6

Qualifying competition
3	Anna Blinkova	6	6
12	(Hungary) Panna Udvardy	4	3

==== Fourth qualifier ====
First round
4	(Germany) Tamara Korpatsch	0	7	1
(Slovakia) Kristína Kučová	6	5	6
(Norway) Malene Helgø	4	2
7	(Belgium) Maryna Zanevska	6	6

Qualifying competition
(Slovakia) Kristína Kučová	4	1
7	(Belgium) Maryna Zanevska	6	6

==== Fifth qualifier ====
First round
5	(Switzerland) Viktorija Golubic	3	6	3
(Ukraine) Kateryna Baindl	6	4	6
Kamilla Rakhimova	0	3
11	(United States) Lauren Davis	6	6

Qualifying competition
(Ukraine) Kateryna Baindl	5	2
11	(United States) Lauren Davis	7	6

==== Sixth qualifier ====
First round
Alt	(Bulgaria) Gergana Topalova	0	3
(France) Diane Parry	6	6
WC	(Australia) Zara Larke	0	1
9	(Slovenia) Tamara Zidanšek	6	6

Qualifying competition
(France) Diane Parry	3	2
9	(Slovenia) Tamara Zidanšek	6	6
