= 2023 Hobart International =

- Date: 9–14 January 2023
- Edition: 28th
- Category: WTA 250
- Draw: 32S / 16D
- Surface: Hard
- Location: Hobart, Australia
- Venue: Hobart International Tennis Centre

Champions

Singles
- (United States) Lauren Davis

Doubles
- (Belgium) Kirsten Flipkens / (Germany) Laura Siegemund
- Hobart International

The 2023 Hobart International was a women's tennis tournament played on outdoor hard courts. It was the 28th edition of the Hobart International and part of the WTA 250 tournaments of the 2023 WTA Tour. It took place at the Hobart International Tennis Centre in Hobart, Australia from 9 to 14 January 2023. This was the first event since 2020, after a two-year absence following the 2021 and 2022 editions had been cancelled due to the COVID-19 pandemic. Unseeded Lauren Davis, who qualified for the main draw, won the singles title.

== Finals ==
=== Singles ===
- (United States) Lauren Davis defeated (Italy) Elisabetta Cocciaretto 7–6^{(7–0)}, 6–2

=== Doubles ===
- (Belgium) Kirsten Flipkens / (Germany) Laura Siegemund defeated (Switzerland) Viktorija Golubic / (Hungary) Panna Udvardy 6–4, 7–5

== Points and prize money ==
=== Point distribution ===
Event^{1}	W	F	SF	QF	Round of 16	Round of 32	Q	Q2	Q1
Singles	280	180	110	60	30	1	18	12	1
Doubles	280	180	110	60	1	—N/a	—N/a	—N/a	—N/a

^{1} Points per the WTA.

== Singles main draw entrants ==
=== Seeds ===
Country	Player	Rank^{1}	Seed
CZE	Marie Bouzková	24	1
BEL	Elise Mertens	29	2
FRA	Alizé Cornet	36	3
USA	Sloane Stephens	37	4
UKR	Anhelina Kalinina	39	5
USA	Bernarda Pera	44	6
POL	Magda Linette	48	7
KAZ	Yulia Putintseva	51	8

- ^{1} Rankings as of 2 January 2023.

=== Other entrants ===
The following players received wildcards into the singles main draw:

- (Australia) Olivia Gadecki
- (Australia) Talia Gibson
- (United States) Sofia Kenin
- (United States) Sloane Stephens

The following player received entry using a special exempt:

- (Belgium) Ysaline Bonaventure

The following players received entry using a protected ranking into the singles main draw:

- (Romania) Jaqueline Cristian
- (Germany) Laura Siegemund
- (Romania) Patricia Maria Țig

The following players received entry from the qualifying draw:

- Anna Blinkova
- (United States) Lauren Davis
- (Czech Republic) Tereza Martincová
- (Spain) Nuria Párrizas Díaz
- (Belgium) Maryna Zanevska
- (Slovenia) Tamara Zidanšek

The following player received entry as a lucky loser:

- (China) Wang Xinyu

=== Withdrawals ===
- (Montenegro) Danka Kovinić → replaced by (China) Wang Xinyu
- (China) Wang Xiyu → replaced by (Germany) Tatjana Maria

== Doubles main draw entrants ==
=== Seeds ===
Country	Player	Country	Player	Rank^{1}	Seed
BEL	Kirsten Flipkens	GER	Laura Siegemund	56	1
JPN	Eri Hozumi	SLO	Tamara Zidanšek	84	2
JPN	Miyu Kato	INA	Aldila Sutjiadi	96	3
GER	Vivian Heisen	JPN	Makoto Ninomiya	112	4

- ^{1} Rankings as of 2 January 2023.

=== Other entrants ===
The following pairs received wildcards into the doubles main draw:

- (Chinese Taipei) Latisha Chan / (Chile) Alexa Guarachi
- (Australia) Olivia Gadecki / (Australia) Talia Gibson

=== Withdrawals ===
- (United Kingdom) Alicia Barnett / (United Kingdom) Olivia Nicholls → replaced by (United Kingdom) Alicia Barnett / (Romania) Monica Niculescu
- (Japan) Makoto Ninomiya / (United States) Alycia Parks → replaced by (Germany) Vivian Heisen / (Japan) Makoto Ninomiya
