= 2023 Hobart International – Doubles =

Doubles
- 2023 Hobart International

Final
- Champions: (Belgium) Kirsten Flipkens (Germany) Laura Siegemund
- Runners-up: (Switzerland) Viktorija Golubic (Hungary) Panna Udvardy
- Score: 6–4, 7–5

Events
Singles	Doubles
← 2020 ·	Hobart International	· 2024 →

Kirsten Flipkens and Laura Siegemund defeated Viktorija Golubic and Panna Udvardy in the final, 6–4, 7–5 to win the doubles tennis title at the 2023 Hobart International.

Nadiia Kichenok and Sania Mirza were the reigning champions from 2020, when the event was last held, but Mirza chose to compete in Adelaide instead. Kichenok partnered Kimberley Zimmermann, but lost in the semifinals to Flipkens and Siegemund.

== Seeds ==
1. (Belgium) Kirsten Flipkens / (Germany) Laura Siegemund (champions)
2. (Japan) Eri Hozumi / (Slovenia) Tamara Zidanšek (quarterfinals)
3. (Japan) Miyu Kato / (Indonesia) Aldila Sutjiadi (quarterfinals)
4. (Germany) Vivian Heisen / (Japan) Makoto Ninomiya (first round)

== Draw ==
=== Key ===
- Q = Qualifier
- WC = Wild card
- LL = Lucky loser
- Alt = Alternate
- SE = Special exempt
- PR = Protected ranking
- ITF = ITF entry
- JE = Junior exempt
- w/o = Walkover
- r = Retired
- d = Defaulted
- SR = Special ranking

=== Draw ===
First round
1	(Belgium) K Flipkens (Germany) L Siegemund	6	6
(Hungary) T Babos (Slovakia) T Mihalíková	4	4
(United States) K Christian (United States) A Kulikov	4	4
WC	(Australia) O Gadecki (Australia) T Gibson	6	6
3	(Japan) M Kato (Indonesia) A Sutjiadi	6	6
(Italy) E Cocciaretto (Italy) J Paolini	0	2
(Ukraine) N Kichenok (Belgium) K Zimmermann	6	7
WC	(Chinese Taipei) L Chan (Chile) A Guarachi	4	5
(United Kingdom) A Barnett (Romania) M Niculescu	6^{2}	6	[10]
(China) X Han (Germany) T Korpatsch	7^{7}	3	[5]
(Switzerland) V Golubic (Hungary) P Udvardy	7^{8}	6
4	(Germany) V Heisen (Japan) M Ninomiya	6^{6}	0
(Georgia (country)) N Dzalamidze; A Panova	3	3
(Norway) U Eikeri (United States) C Harrison	6	6
L Marozava; Y Sizikova	5	6^{6}
2	(Japan) E Hozumi (Slovenia) T Zidanšek	7	7^{8}

Quarterfinals
1	(Belgium) K Flipkens (Germany) L Siegemund	6	6
WC	(Australia) O Gadecki (Australia) T Gibson	2	1
3	(Japan) M Kato (Indonesia) A Sutjiadi	6^{3}	2
(Ukraine) N Kichenok (Belgium) K Zimmermann	7^{7}	6
(United Kingdom) A Barnett (Romania) M Niculescu	6^{4}	2
(Switzerland) V Golubic (Hungary) P Udvardy	7^{7}	6
(Norway) U Eikeri (United States) C Harrison	5	6	[10]
2	(Japan) E Hozumi (Slovenia) T Zidanšek	7	4	[7]

Semifinals
1	(Belgium) K Flipkens (Germany) L Siegemund	6	7^{7}
(Ukraine) N Kichenok (Belgium) K Zimmermann	2	6^{5}
(Switzerland) V Golubic (Hungary) P Udvardy	6	1	[10]
(Norway) U Eikeri (United States) C Harrison	4	6	[2]

Final
1	(Belgium) K Flipkens (Germany) L Siegemund	6	7
(Switzerland) V Golubic (Hungary) P Udvardy	4	5
