= 2023 Ningbo Open – Doubles =

Doubles
- 2023 Ningbo Open

Final
- Champions: (Germany) Laura Siegemund; Vera Zvonareva
- Runners-up: (China) Guo Hanyu (China) Jiang Xinyu
- Score: 4–6, 6–3, [10–5]

Events
Singles	Doubles
- Ningbo Open

Laura Siegemund and Vera Zvonareva defeated Guo Hanyu and Jiang Xinyu in the final, 4–6, 6–3, [10–5] to win the doubles tennis title at the 2023 Ningbo Open.

Arina Rodionova and Olga Savchuk were the reigning champions from 2014, when the tournament was last held, but Rodionova chose not to participate this year and Savchuk retired from professional tennis in 2018.

== Seeds ==
1. (Germany) Laura Siegemund / Vera Zvonareva (champions)
2. (Kazakhstan) Anna Danilina / Alexandra Panova (quarterfinals)
3. (United States) Sabrina Santamaria / Yana Sizikova (first round)
4. (Czech Republic) Anastasia Dețiuc / (Poland) Katarzyna Piter (first round)

== Draw ==
Key

- Q = Qualifier
- WC = Wild card
- LL = Lucky loser
- Alt = Alternate
- ITF = ITF entry
- PR = Protected ranking
- SR = Special ranking
- SE = Special exempt
- JE = Junior exempt
- JR = Junior Accelerator Programme entrant
- CO = College Accelerator Programme entrant
- NG = Next Gen Accelerator Program entrant
- w/o = Walkover
- r = Retired
- d = Defaulted

=== Draw ===
First round
1	(Germany) L Siegemund; V Zvonareva	6	6
S Lansere; K Rakhimova	3	0
Alt	(China) Y Dang (China) Y Yang	4	1
(Georgia (country)) N Dzalamidze (United States) Q Gleason	6	6
3	(United States) S Santamaria; Y Sizikova	2	4
(Slovakia) V Hrunčáková (Netherlands) A Rus	6	6
(Ukraine) K Volodko (China) S Wei	6	4	[2]
(China) S Feng (China) W Zheng	4	6	[10]
(Czech Republic) L Fruhvirtová (Australia) D Saville	7^{9}	6
4	(Czech Republic) A Dețiuc (Poland) K Piter	6^{7}	1
(China) Q Tang (China) Y Yuan	2	6	[4]
(China) H Guo (China) X Jiang	6	2	[10]
(Netherlands) A Hartono (Australia) O Tjandramulia	4	5
2	(Kazakhstan) A Danilina; A Panova	6	7

Quarterfinals
1	(Germany) L Siegemund; V Zvonareva	7^{7}	7
(Georgia (country)) N Dzalamidze (United States) Q Gleason	6^{5}	5
(Slovakia) V Hrunčáková (Netherlands) A Rus	5
V Savinykh (China) X You	4^{r}
(China) S Feng (China) W Zheng	6	6
(Czech Republic) L Fruhvirtová (Australia) D Saville	4	2
(China) H Guo (China) X Jiang	5	6	[10]
2	(Kazakhstan) A Danilina; A Panova	7	0	[6]

Semifinals
1	(Germany) L Siegemund; V Zvonareva	6	6
(Slovakia) V Hrunčáková (Netherlands) A Rus	3	1
(China) S Feng (China) W Zheng	6^{4}	4
(China) H Guo (China) X Jiang	7^{7}	6

Final
1	(Germany) L Siegemund; V Zvonareva	4	6	[10]
(China) H Guo (China) X Jiang	6	3	[5]
