= 2023 Ningbo Open – Singles =

Women's tennis tournament

Singles
- 2023 Ningbo Open

Final
- Champion: (Tunisia) Ons Jabeur
- Runner-up: Diana Shnaider
- Score: 6–2, 6–1

Details
- Draw: 32
- Seeds: 8

Events
Singles	Doubles
- Ningbo Open

Ons Jabeur defeated Diana Shnaider in the final, 6–2, 6–1 to win the singles tennis title at the 2023 Ningbo Open. It was her first hardcourt title on the WTA Tour, after prior championships on clay and grass surfaces. Shnaider was contesting her first WTA Tour final.

Magda Linette was the reigning champion from 2014, when the tournament was last held, but did not participate this year.

== Seeds ==
1. (Tunisia) Ons Jabeur (Champion)
2. (Czech Republic) Petra Kvitová (quarterfinals)
3. (Romania) Sorana Cîrstea (second round)
4. Anna Blinkova (second round)
5. (France) Varvara Gracheva (first round)
6. (Netherlands) Arantxa Rus (first round)
7. (United Kingdom) Katie Boulter (first round)
8. (Italy) Lucia Bronzetti (quarterfinals)

== Draw ==
Key

- Q = Qualifier
- WC = Wild card
- LL = Lucky loser
- Alt = Alternate
- ITF = ITF entry
- PR = Protected ranking
- SR = Special ranking
- SE = Special exempt
- JE = Junior exempt
- JR = Junior Accelerator Programme entrant
- CO = College Accelerator Programme entrant
- NG = Next Gen Accelerator Program entrant
- w/o = Walkover
- r = Retired
- d = Defaulted

=== Finals ===
Semifinals
1/WC	(Tunisia) Ons Jabeur	6	1	6
(Argentina) Nadia Podoroska	3	6	2
(Czech Republic) Linda Fruhvirtová	4	1
Diana Shnaider	6	6

Final
1/WC	(Tunisia) Ons Jabeur	6	6
Diana Shnaider	2	1

=== Top half ===
First round
1/WC	(Tunisia) O Jabeur	7^{7}	7
(France) D Parry	6^{3}	5
(Germany) T Korpatsch	6	7^{7}
Q	(United Kingdom) J Burrage	2	6^{1}
E Avanesyan	4	1
(Denmark) C Tauson	6	6
WC	V Zvonareva	6	4	7^{7}
7	(United Kingdom) K Boulter	4	6	6^{3}
3	(Romania) S Cîrstea	7	4	6
(United States) C Liu	5	6	3
(Czech Republic) K Siniaková	6	6
LL	(United States) E Mandlik	0	4
(Argentina) N Podoroska	7^{7}	6
WC	(China) Xiy Wang	6^{3}	4
Q	V Savinykh	7	7
5	(France) V Gracheva	5	5

Second round
1/WC	(Tunisia) O Jabeur	6	6
(Germany) T Korpatsch	3	2
(Denmark) C Tauson	4	0^{r}
WC	V Zvonareva	6	1
3	(Romania) S Cîrstea	3	5
(Czech Republic) K Siniaková	6	7
(Argentina) N Podoroska	4	6	6
Q	V Savinykh	6	0	2

Quarterfinals
1/WC	(Tunisia) O Jabeur	7	4	6
WC	V Zvonareva	5	6	1
(Czech Republic) K Siniaková	1	1
(Argentina) N Podoroska	6	6

Semifinals
1/WC	(Tunisia) O Jabeur	6	1	6
(Argentina) N Podoroska	3	6	2

=== Bottom half ===
First round
8	(Italy) L Bronzetti	7^{8}	6
Q	(Switzerland) J Teichmann	6^{6}	4
WC	(China) Y Yuan	6	4	3
(Ukraine) K Baindl	3	6	6
(Spain) R Masarova	6	2	0^{r}
(Czech Republic) L Fruhvirtová	1	6	1
Q	(Slovakia) V Hrunčáková	3	5
4	A Blinkova	6	7
6	(Netherlands) A Rus	6	6^{5}	3
K Rakhimova	3	7^{7}	6
D Shnaider	6	1	6
Q	(China) Z Bai	4	6	2
PR	(Australia) D Saville	4	1
(Kazakhstan) Y Putintseva	6	6
Q	(Germany) A-L Friedsam	6^{2}	1
2	(Czech Republic) P Kvitová	7^{7}	6

Second round
8	(Italy) L Bronzetti	6	6
(Ukraine) K Baindl	3	3
(Czech Republic) L Fruhvirtová	6	3	6
4	A Blinkova	3	6	1
K Rakhimova	3	2
D Shnaider	6	6
(Kazakhstan) Y Putintseva
2	(Czech Republic) P Kvitová	w/o

Quarterfinals
8	(Italy) L Bronzetti	0	3
(Czech Republic) L Fruhvirtová	6	6
D Shnaider	6	4	6
2	(Czech Republic) P Kvitová	1	6	3

Semifinals
(Czech Republic) L Fruhvirtová	4	1
D Shnaider	6	6

== Qualifying ==
=== Seeds ===
1. (United Kingdom) Jodie Burrage (qualified)
2. (Germany) Anna-Lena Friedsam (qualified)
3. (Slovakia) Viktória Hrunčáková (qualified)
4. (China) Bai Zhuoxuan (qualified)
5. (Canada) Rebecca Marino (qualifying competition)
6. (Switzerland) Jil Teichmann (qualified)
7. (United States) Elizabeth Mandlik (qualifying competition, lucky loser)
8. Valeria Savinykh (qualified)
9. (Netherlands) Arianne Hartono (qualifying competition)
10. (China) You Xiaodi (qualifying competition)
11. Jana Kolodynska (qualifying competition)
12. (Ukraine) Kateryna Volodko (qualifying competition)

=== Qualifiers ===
1. (United Kingdom) Jodie Burrage
2. (Germany) Anna-Lena Friedsam
3. (Slovakia) Viktória Hrunčáková
4. (China) Bai Zhuoxuan
5. Valeria Savinykh
6. (Switzerland) Jil Teichmann

=== Lucky loser ===
1. (United States) Elizabeth Mandlik

=== Qualifying draw ===
==== First qualifier ====
First round
1	(United Kingdom) Jodie Burrage	6	6
(China) Lu Jiajing	4	1
WC	(China) Wang Meiling	1	5
11	Jana Kolodynska	6	7

Qualifying competition
1	(United Kingdom) Jodie Burrage	3	6	6
11	Jana Kolodynska	6	1	4

==== Second qualifier ====
First round
2	(Germany) Anna-Lena Friedsam	7^{7}	6
WC	(China) Ren Yufei	6^{3}	2
WC	(China) Zheng Wushuang	2	6	4
12	(Ukraine) Kateryna Volodko	6	4	6

Qualifying competition
2	(Germany) Anna-Lena Friedsam	6	6
12	(Ukraine) Kateryna Volodko	4	4

==== Third qualifier ====
First round
3	(Slovakia) Viktória Hrunčáková	6	6
WC	(China) Lu Jingjing	4	1
(China) Li Zongyu	3	5
10	(China) You Xiaodi	6	7

Qualifying competition
3	(Slovakia) Viktória Hrunčáková	6	6
10	(China) You Xiaodi	4	2

==== Fourth qualifier ====
First round
4	(China) Bai Zhuoxuan	7^{7}	6
WC	(China) Yao Xinxin	6^{2}	0
(Australia) Olivia Tjandramulia	0	1
7	(United States) Elizabeth Mandlik	6	6

Qualifying competition
4	(China) Bai Zhuoxuan	7	6
7	(United States) Elizabeth Mandlik	5	4

==== Fifth qualifier ====
First round
5	(Canada) Rebecca Marino	4	6	7
WC	(China) Feng Shuo	6	3	5
(China) Wei Sijia	6	3	2
8	Valeria Savinykh	2	6	6

Qualifying competition
5	(Canada) Rebecca Marino	6	5	5
8	Valeria Savinykh	3	7	7

==== Sixth qualifier ====
First round
6	(Switzerland) Jil Teichmann	6	6
WC	(China) Yang Yidi	2	1
(United States) Quinn Gleason	3	4
9	(Netherlands) Arianne Hartono	6	6

Qualifying competition
6	(Switzerland) Jil Teichmann	6	3	7
9	(Netherlands) Arianne Hartono	3	6	5
