= 2023 Ningbo Open =

- Date: 25–30 September
- Edition: 6th
- Category: WTA 250
- Draw: 32S / 15D
- Prize money: $259,303
- Surface: Hard / outdoor
- Location: Ningbo, China
- Venue: Ningbo Yinzhou Tennis Center

Champions

Singles
- (Tunisia) Ons Jabeur

Doubles
- (Germany) Laura Siegemund / Vera Zvonareva
- Ningbo Open

The 2023 Ningbo Open was a professional women's tennis tournament played on outdoor hardcourts. It was the 6th women's edition of the Ningbo International Tennis Open, but the first since 2014 and the first as a WTA 250 tournament on the 2023 WTA Tour. It took place at the Yinzhou Tennis Center in Ningbo, China, from 25 September through 30 September 2023.

== Champions ==
=== Singles ===
- (Tunisia) Ons Jabeur def. Diana Shnaider 6–2, 6–1

=== Doubles ===
- (Germany) Laura Siegemund / Vera Zvonareva def. (China) Guo Hanyu / (China) Jiang Xinyu, 4–6, 6–3, [10–5]

== Singles main-draw entrants ==
=== Seeds ===
Country	Player	Rank^{1}	Seed
TUN	Ons Jabeur	7	1
CZE	Petra Kvitová	14	2
ROU	Sorana Cîrstea	25	3
	Anna Blinkova	40	4
FRA	Varvara Gracheva	44	5
NED	Arantxa Rus	47	6
GBR	Katie Boulter	50	7
ITA	Lucia Bronzetti	60	8

- ^{1} Rankings are as of 18 September 2023

=== Other entrants ===
The following players received wildcards into the singles main draw:

- (Tunisia) Ons Jabeur
- (China) Wang Xiyu
- (China) Yuan Yue
- Vera Zvonareva

The following players received entry using a protected ranking:

- (Australia) Daria Saville

The following players received entry from the qualifying draw:

- (China) Bai Zhuoxuan
- (United Kingdom) Jodie Burrage
- (Germany) Anna-Lena Friedsam
- (Slovakia) Viktória Hrunčáková
- Valeria Savinykh
- (Switzerland) Jil Teichmann

The following player received entry as a lucky loser:

- (United States) Elizabeth Mandlik

=== Withdrawals ===
- (Romania) Irina-Camelia Begu → replaced by (Italy) Lucia Bronzetti
- (United States) Jennifer Brady → replaced by Elina Avanesyan
- (Austria) Julia Grabher → replaced by Kamilla Rakhimova
- (Belgium) Elise Mertens → replaced by (Argentina) Nadia Podoroska
- (United States) Alycia Parks → replaced by (Germany) Tamara Korpatsch
- Anastasia Potapova → replaced by (United States) Claire Liu
- (Egypt) Mayar Sherif → replaced by (Spain) Rebeka Masarova
- (Italy) Martina Trevisan → replaced by (United States) Elizabeth Mandlik

== Doubles main-draw entrants ==
=== Seeds ===
Country	Player	Country	Player	Rank^{1}	Seed
GER	Laura Siegemund		Vera Zvonareva	35	1
KAZ	Anna Danilina		Alexandra Panova	92	2
USA	Sabrina Santamaria		Yana Sizikova	119	3
CZE	Anastasia Detiuc	POL	Katarzyna Piter	154	4

- ^{1} Rankings are as of 18 September 2023

=== Other entrants ===
The following pair received entry as alternates:

- (China) Dang Yiming / (China) Yang Yidi

=== Withdrawals ===
- (United Kingdom) Naiktha Bains / (United Kingdom) Maia Lumsden → replaced by (China) Dang Yiming / (China) Yang Yidi
- (United Kingdom) Jodie Burrage / (Spain) Rebeka Masarova
