= 2024 Hobart International – Doubles =

Doubles
- 2024 Hobart International

Final
- Champions: (Chinese Taipei) Chan Hao-ching (Mexico) Giuliana Olmos
- Runners-up: (China) Guo Hanyu (China) Jiang Xinyu
- Score: 6–3, 6–3

Events
Singles	Doubles
← 2023 ·	Hobart International	· 2025 →

Chan Hao-ching and Giuliana Olmos defeated Guo Hanyu and Jiang Xinyu in the final, 6–3, 6–3 to win the doubles tennis title at the 2024 Hobart International.

Kirsten Flipkens and Laura Siegemund were the reigning champions, but Flipkens retired from professional tennis in July 2023 and Siegemund chose to compete this year in Adelaide instead.

== Seeds ==
1. (United States) Desirae Krawczyk / (Japan) Ena Shibahara (quarterfinals)
2. (Chinese Taipei) Chan Hao-ching / (Mexico) Giuliana Olmos (champions)
3. (Japan) Eri Hozumi / (Japan) Makoto Ninomiya (semifinals)
4. (Kazakhstan) Anna Danilina / (Ukraine) Nadiia Kichenok (semifinals)

== Draw ==
=== Key ===
- Q = Qualifier
- WC = Wild card
- LL = Lucky loser
- Alt = Alternate
- SE = Special exempt
- PR = Protected ranking
- ITF = ITF entry
- JE = Junior exempt
- w/o = Walkover
- r = Retired
- d = Defaulted
- SR = Special ranking

=== Draw ===
First round
1	(United States) D Krawczyk (Japan) E Shibahara	7^{7}	6
(Slovakia) T Mihalíková (China) Y Xu	6^{5}	1
(China) H Guo (China) X Jiang	6	6
WC	(Australia) E Bolton (Australia) A Bozovic	2	2
4	(Kazakhstan) A Danilina (Ukraine) N Kichenok	7	7^{7}
L Marozava (Poland) K Piter	5	6^{0}
(Argentina) N Podoroska (Egypt) M Sherif	7	1	[10]
Y Sizikova (Chinese Taipei) F-h Wu	5	6	[6]
(Georgia (country)) O Kalashnikova (United Kingdom) M Lumsden	7^{7}	1	[8]
WC	(Australia) K Birrell (Australia) O Gadecki	6^{2}	6	[10]
(Belgium) G Minnen (Belgium) Y Wickmayer	2	2
3	(Japan) E Hozumi (Japan) M Ninomiya	6	6
(Germany) T Maria (Netherlands) A Rus	6	3	[5]
I Khromacheva (Czech Republic) M Kolodziejová	3	6	[10]
(United States) S Chang (United States) B Mattek-Sands	1	3
2	(Chinese Taipei) H-c Chan (Mexico) G Olmos	6	6

Quarterfinals
1	(United States) D Krawczyk (Japan) E Shibahara	7^{7}	3	[7]
(China) H Guo (China) X Jiang	6^{5}	6	[10]
4	(Kazakhstan) A Danilina (Ukraine) N Kichenok	w/o
(Argentina) N Podoroska (Egypt) M Sherif
WC	(Australia) K Birrell (Australia) O Gadecki	6^{5}	4
3	(Japan) E Hozumi (Japan) M Ninomiya	7^{7}	6
I Khromacheva (Czech Republic) M Kolodziejová	6	2	[0]
2	(Chinese Taipei) H-c Chan (Mexico) G Olmos	4	6	[10]

Semifinals
(China) H Guo (China) X Jiang	7	6
4	(Kazakhstan) A Danilina (Ukraine) N Kichenok	5	3
3	(Japan) E Hozumi (Japan) M Ninomiya	4	3
2	(Chinese Taipei) H-c Chan (Mexico) G Olmos	6	6

Final
(China) H Guo (China) X Jiang	3	3
2	(Chinese Taipei) H-c Chan (Mexico) G Olmos	6	6
