= 2025 Hobart International – Singles =

Singles
- 2025 Hobart International

Final
- Champion: (United States) McCartney Kessler
- Runner-up: (Belgium) Elise Mertens
- Score: 6–4, 3–6, 6–0

Details
- Draw: 32 (6 Q / 3 WC )
- Seeds: 8

Events
Singles	Doubles
- Hobart International

McCartney Kessler defeated Elise Mertens in the final, 6–4, 3–6, 6–0 to win the singles tennis title at the 2025 Hobart International. It was her second WTA Tour title.

Emma Navarro was the reigning champion, but chose to compete in Adelaide instead.

== Seeds ==
1. (Ukraine) Dayana Yastremska (quarterfinals)
2. (Belgium) Elise Mertens (final)
3. (United States) Amanda Anisimova (quarterfinals, withdrew)
4. (Poland) Magda Linette (second round)
5. (New Zealand) Lulu Sun (first round)
6. (Armenia) Elina Avanesyan (semifinals)
7. (Slovakia) Rebecca Šramková (first round)
8. (China) Yuan Yue (first round)

== Draw ==
Key

- Q = Qualifier
- WC = Wild card
- LL = Lucky loser
- Alt = Alternate
- ITF = ITF entry
- PR = Protected ranking
- SR = Special ranking
- SE = Special exempt
- JE = Junior exempt
- JR = Junior Accelerator Programme entrant
- CO = College Accelerator Programme entrant
- NG = Next Gen Accelerator Program entrant
- w/o = Walkover
- r = Retired
- d = Defaulted

=== Finals ===
Semifinals
(United States) McCartney Kessler	4	6	6
6	(Armenia) Elina Avanesyan	6	3	4
WC	(Australia) Maya Joint	2	3
2	(Belgium) Elise Mertens	6	6

Final
(United States) McCartney Kessler	6	3	6
2	(Belgium) Elise Mertens	4	6	0

=== Top half ===
First round
1	(Ukraine) D Yastremska	2	6	6
(United States) K Volynets	6	4	1
WC	(United States) S Stephens	5	1
Q	(United States) A Li	7	6
Q	(Argentina) ML Carlé	6	3	6
(Spain) J Bouzas Maneiro	3	6	0
(United States) M Kessler	6	7
7	(Slovakia) R Šramková	3	5
3	(United States) A Anisimova	6	6
WC	(Australia) D Saville	3	3
Q	(Hungary) A Bondár	7	6
(Egypt) M Sherif	5	4
(Bulgaria) V Tomova	5	3
Q	(Belgium) G Minnen	7	6
Q	(China) Xiy Wang	3	5
6	(Armenia) E Avanesyan	6	7

Second round
1	(Ukraine) D Yastremska	1	7	6
Q	(United States) A Li	6	5	2
Q	(Argentina) ML Carlé	2	2
(United States) M Kessler	6	6
3	(United States) A Anisimova	6	6
Q	(Hungary) A Bondár	3	4
Q	(Belgium) G Minnen	2	2
6	(Armenia) E Avanesyan	6	6

Quarterfinals
1	(Ukraine) D Yastremska	5	4
(United States) M Kessler	7	6
3	(United States) A Anisimova
6	(Armenia) E Avanesyan	w/o

Semifinals
(United States) M Kessler	4	6	6
6	(Armenia) E Avanesyan	6	3	4

=== Bottom half ===
First round
5	(New Zealand) L Sun	6	3	3
WC	(United States) S Kenin	4	6	6
A Blinkova	7	6
(United States) B Pera	5	4
(Serbia) O Danilović	2	3
WC	(Australia) M Joint	6	6
(France) V Gracheva	3	6	4
4	(Poland) M Linette	6	3	6
8	(China) Y Yuan	2	3
(Colombia) C Osorio	6	6
V Kudermetova	7	6
(Italy) E Cocciaretto	5	0
LL	(Mexico) R Zarazúa	6	6
LL	(Italy) L Bronzetti	4	3
Q	(Spain) N Párrizas Díaz	3	1
2	(Belgium) E Mertens	6	6

Second round
WC	(United States) S Kenin	6	3	6
A Blinkova	2	6	2
WC	(Australia) M Joint	6	6
4	(Poland) M Linette	1	1
(Colombia) C Osorio	4	1
V Kudermetova	6	6
LL	(Mexico) R Zarazúa	4	3
2	(Belgium) E Mertens	6	6

Quarterfinals
WC	(United States) S Kenin	3	1
WC	(Australia) M Joint	6	6
V Kudermetova	1	6	2
2	(Belgium) E Mertens	6	0	6

Semifinals
WC	(Australia) M Joint	2	3
2	(Belgium) E Mertens	6	6

== Qualifying ==
=== Seeds ===
1. (Italy) Lucia Bronzetti (qualifying competition, lucky loser)
2. (Mexico) Renata Zarazúa (qualifying competition, lucky loser)
3. (Netherlands) Arantxa Rus (qualifying competition)
4. Erika Andreeva (qualifying competition)
5. (Netherlands) Suzan Lamens (qualifying competition)
6. (Turkey) Zeynep Sönmez (qualifying competition)
7. (Spain) Nuria Párrizas Díaz (qualified)
8. (Hungary) Anna Bondár (qualified)
9. (Argentina) María Lourdes Carlé (qualified)
10. (Belgium) Greet Minnen (qualified)
11. (United States) Ann Li (qualified)
12. (China) Wang Xiyu (qualified)

=== Qualifiers ===
1. (Belgium) Greet Minnen
2. (Argentina) María Lourdes Carlé
3. (Spain) Nuria Párrizas Díaz
4. (China) Wang Xiyu
5. (United States) Ann Li
6. (Hungary) Anna Bondár

=== Lucky losers ===
1. (Italy) Lucia Bronzetti
2. (Mexico) Renata Zarazúa

=== Qualifying draw ===
==== First qualifier ====
First round
1	(Italy) Lucia Bronzetti	6	7^{9}
(Australia) Talia Gibson	2	6^{7}
(Greece) Despina Papamichail	3	1
10	(Belgium) Greet Minnen	6	6

Qualifying competition
1	(Italy) Lucia Bronzetti	3	6^{4}
10	(Belgium) Greet Minnen	6	7^{7}

==== Second qualifier ====
First round
2	(Mexico) Renata Zarazúa	6	7^{7}
(Japan) Haruka Kaji	1	6^{5}
WC	(Australia) Catherine Aulia	4	3
9	(Argentina) María Lourdes Carlé	6	6

Qualifying competition
2	(Mexico) Renata Zarazúa	1	7^{8}	1
9	(Argentina) María Lourdes Carlé	6	6^{6}	6

==== Third qualifier ====
First round
3	(Netherlands) Arantxa Rus	6	6
(Canada) Stacey Fung	1	1
(United Kingdom) Emily Appleton	6	4	4
7	(Spain) Nuria Párrizas Díaz	4	6	6

Qualifying competition
3	(Netherlands) Arantxa Rus	2	7	6^{5}
7	(Spain) Nuria Párrizas Díaz	6	5	7^{7}

==== Fourth qualifier ====
First round
4	Erika Andreeva	7	3	6
(Australia) Alexandra Bozovic	5	6	1
(Australia) Ava Beck	0	0
12	(China) Wang Xiyu	6	6

Qualifying competition
4	Erika Andreeva	3	3
12	(China) Wang Xiyu	6	6

==== Fifth qualifier ====
First round
5	(Netherlands) Suzan Lamens	6	6
WC	(Australia) Renee Alame	0	3
(France) Chloé Paquet	6	3	1
11	(United States) Ann Li	2	6	6

Qualifying competition
5	(Netherlands) Suzan Lamens	1	4
11	(United States) Ann Li	6	6

==== Sixth qualifier ====
First round
6	(Turkey) Zeynep Sönmez	6	6
(Thailand) Peangtarn Plipuech	0	1
(United Kingdom) Tara Moore	6^{3}	4
8	(Hungary) Anna Bondár	7^{7}	6

Qualifying competition
6	(Turkey) Zeynep Sönmez	5	3
8	(Hungary) Anna Bondár	7	6
