= Jiang Xinyu =

Chinese tennis player (born 1999)

Jiang Xinyu 蒋欣玗
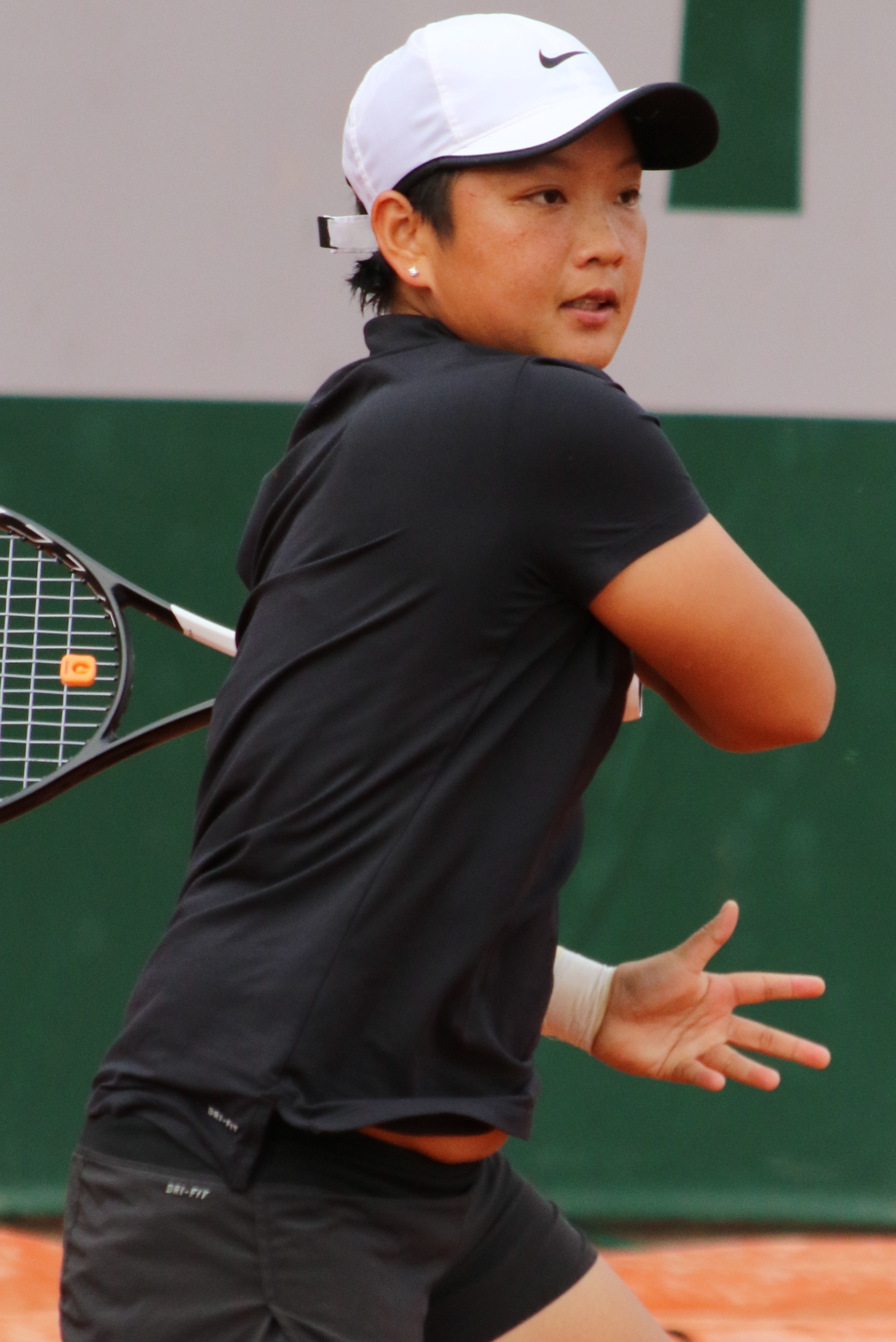
- Jiang at the 2019 French Open
- Country (sports): China
- Born: 3 March 1999 (age 27) Ziyang, China
- Height: 1.60 m (5 ft 3 in)
- Plays: Right-handed
- Prize money: $1,080,465

Singles
- Career record: 86–74
- Career titles: 0
- Highest ranking: No. 511 (16 October 2023)

Doubles
- Career record: 238–148
- Career titles: 7
- Highest ranking: No. 25 (3 November 2025)
- Current ranking: No. 32 (31 August 2026)

Grand Slam doubles results
- Australian Open: 3R (2024)
- French Open: 2R (2025)
- Wimbledon: SF (2026)
- US Open: QF (2026)

Grand Slam mixed doubles results
- French Open: 2R (2025)
- Wimbledon: 2R (2025)

Team competitions
- Fed Cup: 7–1
Medal record
Women's tennis
Representing China
Asian Games
Bronze medal – third place	2026 Aichi–Nagoya	Mixed doubles
World University Games
Silver medal – second place	2021 Chengdu	Doubles
Silver medal – second place	2021 Chengdu	Team
- Last updated on: 31 August 2026.

Jiang Xinyu (Chinese: 蒋欣玗; pinyin: Jiǎng Xīnyú; Mandarin pronunciation: [tɕjàŋ ɕín y̌]; born 3 March 1999) is a Chinese professional tennis player who specializes in doubles. She achieved a career-high doubles ranking of world No. 25, on 3 November 2025. Jiang has won seven doubles titles on the WTA Tour and 18 doubles titles on the ITF Women's Circuit. On 16 October 2023, she peaked at No. 511 in the singles rankings.

Playing for China Billie Jean King Cup team, she has a win-loss record of 7–1.

== Career ==
=== 2017-2018: First WTA Tour titles, Premier 5 debut ===
She has won her biggest title in 2017 at the Jiangxi International Open in Nanchang, partnering Tang Qianhui, and then successfully defended it the following year.

She made her WTA Premier 5 debut at the 2018 Wuhan Open with Wang Qiang.

=== 2023: Third doubles title, tour singles debut ===
After a break from competing on the professional tour, she made her comeback in January 2023 on the ITF Circuit. In April, she participated with the Chinese team in Billie Jean King Cup competition.

In September, Jiang won her third career title at the 2023 Guangzhou Open with Guo Hanyu. Also with Guo, she reached the final of the Ningbo Open. She received wildcards in doubles for the WTA 1000 China Open, and for the WTA 500 Zhengzhou Open with Guo where they lost to top seeds and eventual champions, Gabriela Dabrowski and Erin Routliffe, in the semifinals. In late October, she received a wildcard for her WTA Tour main-draw debut at the Jiangxi Open but lost to Sara Sorribes Tormo. At the same tournament, she reached the semifinals in doubles with Guo.

=== 2024–2025: Back-to-back titles, WTA 1000 final, top 25 ===
Following a sixth final at the 2024 Thailand Open with Guo Hanyu and her first third-round showing in a major at the Australian Open, she reached the top 50, on 5 February 2024.

Partnering Wu Fang-hsien, Jiang won the doubles title at the 2025 Auckland Open, defeating Aleksandra Krunić and Sabrina Santamaria in the final. The following week, the pair won the Hobart International doubles title, overcoming Monica Niculescu and Fanny Stollár in the final.

In February, Jiang and Wu reached the final at the WTA 1000 Qatar Ladies Open, losing to Sara Errani and Jasmine Paolini in straight sets. At the WTA 1000 Miami Open, the pair reached the semifinals again defeating Asia Muhammad and Demi Schuurs, Ashlyn Krueger and Jessica Pegula by retirement, and the Chinese pair of Zheng Saisai and Wang Xinyu.

She won her sixth career title at Hong Kong with Wang Yafan and finished the season in the top 25 in the WTA doubles rankings.

== WTA Tour finals ==
=== Doubles: 13 (7 titles, 6 runner-ups) ===
Legend Premier Mandatory & Premier 5 / WTA 1000 (0–1) Premier / WTA 500 (1–1) International / WTA 250 (6–4)	Finals by surface Hard (7–6)

Result	W–L	Date	Tournament	Tier	Surface	Partner	Opponents	Score
Win	1–0	Jul 2017	Jiangxi Open, China	International	Hard	(China) Tang Qianhui	(Russia) Alla Kudryavtseva (Australia) Arina Rodionova	6–3, 6–2
Win	2–0	Jul 2018	Jiangxi Open, China (2)	International	Hard	(China) Tang Qianhui	(China) Lu Jingjing (China) You Xiaodi	6–4, 6–4
Win	3–0	Sep 2023	Guangzhou Open, China	WTA 250	Hard	(China) Guo Hanyu	(Japan) Eri Hozumi (Japan) Makoto Ninomiya	6–3, 7–6^{(7–4)}
Loss	3–1	Sep 2023	Ningbo Open, China	WTA 250	Hard	(China) Guo Hanyu	(Germany) Laura Siegemund; Vera Zvonareva	6–4, 3–6, [5–10]
Loss	3–2	Jan 2024	Hobart International, Australia	WTA 250	Hard	(China) Guo Hanyu	(Chinese Taipei) Chan Hao-ching (Mexico) Giuliana Olmos	3–6, 3–6
Loss	3–3	Feb 2024	Hua Hin Championships, Thailand	WTA 250	Hard	(China) Guo Hanyu	(Japan) Miyu Kato (Indonesia) Aldila Sutjiadi	4–6, 6–1, [7–10]
Loss	3–4	Aug 2024	Washington Open, United States	WTA 500	Hard	(Chinese Taipei) Wu Fang-hsien	(United States) Taylor Townsend (United States) Asia Muhammad	6–7^{(0–7)}, 3–6
Win	4–4	Jan 2025	Auckland Open, New Zealand	WTA 250	Hard	(Chinese Taipei) Wu Fang-hsien	(Serbia) Aleksandra Krunić (United States) Sabrina Santamaria	6–3, 6–4
Win	5–4	Jan 2025	Hobart International, Australia	WTA 250	Hard	(Chinese Taipei) Wu Fang-hsien	(Romania) Monica Niculescu (Hungary) Fanny Stollár	6–1, 7–6^{(8–6)}
Loss	5–5	Feb 2025	Qatar Ladies Open	WTA 1000	Hard	(Chinese Taipei) Wu Fang-hsien	(Italy) Sara Errani (Italy) Jasmine Paolini	5–7, 6–7^{(10–12)}
Loss	5–6	Aug 2025	Tennis in the Land, United States	WTA 250	Hard	(Chinese Taipei) Chan Hao-ching	(Kazakhstan) Anna Danilina (Serbia) Aleksandra Krunić	6–7^{(3–7)}, 4–6
Win	6–6	Nov 2025	Hong Kong Open, China SAR	WTA 250	Hard	(China) Wang Yafan	(Japan) Momoko Kobori (Thailand) Peangtarn Plipuech	6–4, 6–2
Win	7–6	Mar 2026	Mérida Open, Mexico	WTA 500	Hard	(Spain) Cristina Bucșa	(Netherlands) Isabelle Haverlag (United Kingdom) Maia Lumsden	6–4, 6–1

== ITF Circuit finals ==
=== Singles: 1 (runner-up) ===
Legend W25 tournaments (0–1)	Finals by surface Hard (0–1)

Result	Date	Tournament	Tier	Surface	Opponent	Score
Loss	May 2023	ITF Incheon, South Korea	W25	Hard	(Hong Kong) Cody Wong	6–1, 3–6, 0–3 ret.

=== Doubles: 26 (18 titles, 8 runner-ups) ===
Legend W100 tournaments (2–0) W50/60 tournaments (3–1) W40 tournaments (1–0) W25 tournaments (11–4) W10/15 tournaments (1–3)	Finals by surface Hard (16–6) Clay (2–2)

Result	W–L	Date	Tournament	Tier	Surface	Partner	Opponents	Score
Loss	0–1	Mar 2015	ITF Jiangmen, China	W10	Clay	(China) Tang Qianhui	(Chinese Taipei) Hsu Ching-wen (China) Tang Haochen	4–6, 3–6
Loss	0–2	Dec 2015	ITF Hong Kong, China	W10	Hard	(China) Li Yihong	(Finland) Emma Laine (Japan) Yukina Saigo	1–6, 1–6
Win	1–2	Jul 2016	ITF Yuxi, China	W25	Hard	(China) Tang Qianhui	(China) Gai Ao (China) Guo Shanshan	6–2, 3–6, [10–5]
Loss	1–3	Jul 2016	ITF Qujing, China	W25	Hard	(China) Tang Qianhui	(Japan) Akiko Omae (Thailand) Peangtarn Plipuech	3–6, 3–6
Loss	1–4	Sep 2016	Zhuhai Open, China	W50	Hard	(China) Guo Hanyu	(India) Ankita Raina (United Kingdom) Emily Webley-Smith	4–6, 4–6
Win	2–4	Feb 2017	ITF Nanjing, China	W15	Hard	(China) Guo Shanshan	(Thailand) Nudnida Luangnam (China) Ye Qiuyu	7–5, 7–5
Win	3–4	May 2017	ITF Yuxi, China	W25	Hard	(China) Tang Qianhui	(China) Gai Ao (China) Kang Jiaqi	6–2, 7–5
Win	4–4	May 2017	ITF Qujing, China	W25	Hard	(China) Tang Qianhui	(China) Feng Shuo (China) Zhao Xiaoxi	6–4, 6–3
Win	5–4	May 2017	Jin'an Open, China	W60	Hard	(China) Tang Qianhui	(Japan) Mana Ayukawa (Japan) Erika Sema	7–5, 6–4
Loss	5–5	Jun 2017	ITF Wuhan, China	W25	Hard	(China) Tang Qianhui	(Australia) Alison Bai (China) Lu Jiajing	2–6, 6–7^{(3)}
Loss	5–6	Jul 2017	ITF Anning, China	W15	Clay	(China) Tang Qianhui	(China) Feng Shuo (China) Li Yihong	3–6, 4–6
Win	6–6	Jul 2017	ITF Tianjin, China	W25	Hard	(China) Tang Qianhui	(China) Liu Chang (China) Lu Jiajing	6–4, 6–1
Loss	6–7	Sep 2017	ITF Guiyang, China	W25	Hard	(China) Tang Qianhui	(Belarus) Lidziya Marozava (Uzbekistan) Sabina Sharipova	2–6, 3–6
Win	7–7	Jun 2018	Changsha Open, China	W25	Hard	(China) Feng Shuo	(China) Han Xinyun (China) Zhang Ying	6–3, 4–6, [11–9]
Loss	7–8	Jul 2018	ITF Naiman, China	W25	Hard	(China) Tang Qianhui	(China) Kang Jiaqi (South Korea) Kim Na-ri	7–6^{(4)}, 4–6, [5–10]
Win	8–8	Jul 2018	ITF Tianjin, China	W25	Hard	(China) Feng Shuo	(China) Chen Jiahui (China) Ye Qiuyu	6–4, 6–4
Win	9–8	May 2019	ITF Wuhan, China	W25	Hard	(Japan) Erika Sema	(China) Guo Meiqi (China) Wu Meixu	7–6^{(3)}, 6–2
Win	10–8	Jul 2019	ITF Tianjin, China	W25	Hard	(China) Tang Qianhui	(China) Wu Meixu (China) Zheng Wushuang	7–5, 6–2
Win	11–8	Aug 2019	ITF Guiyang, China	W25	Hard	(China) Tang Qianhui	(Hong Kong) Eudice Chong (Indonesia) Aldila Sutjiadi	7–5, 7–5
Win	12–8	Sep 2019	Changsha Open, China	W60	Clay	(China) Tang Qianhui	(India) Rutuja Bhosale (Japan) Erika Sema	6–3, 3–6, [11–9]
Win	13–8	Oct 2019	Suzhou Ladies Open, China	W100	Hard	(China) Tang Qianhui	(India) Ankita Raina (Netherlands) Rosalie van der Hoek	3–6, 6–3, [10–5]
Win	14–8	Nov 2019	Liuzhou Open, China	W60	Hard	(China) Tang Qianhui	(India) Ankita Raina (Netherlands) Rosalie van der Hoek	6–4, 6–4
Win	15–8	Jun 2023	ITF Changwon, South Korea	W25	Hard	(China) Guo Hanyu	(Chinese Taipei) Cho I-hsuan (Chinese Taipei) Cho Yi-tsen	7–6^{(4)}, 7–6^{(1)}
Win	16–8	Aug 2023	Kunming Open, China	W40	Clay	(China) Guo Hanyu	(Kazakhstan) Zhibek Kulambayeva (Thailand) Lanlana Tararudee	6–2, 6–0
Win	17–8	Sep 2023	ITF Guiyang, China	W25	Hard	(China) Guo Hanyu	(Chinese Taipei) Cho I-hsuan (Chinese Taipei) Cho Yi-tsen	7–5, 6–4
Win	18–8	Nov 2023	Takasaki Open, Japan	W100	Hard	(China) Guo Hanyu	(Japan) Momoko Kobori (Japan) Ayano Shimizu	7–6^{(5)}, 5–7, [10–5]
