= Sofia Kenin =

American tennis player (born 1998)

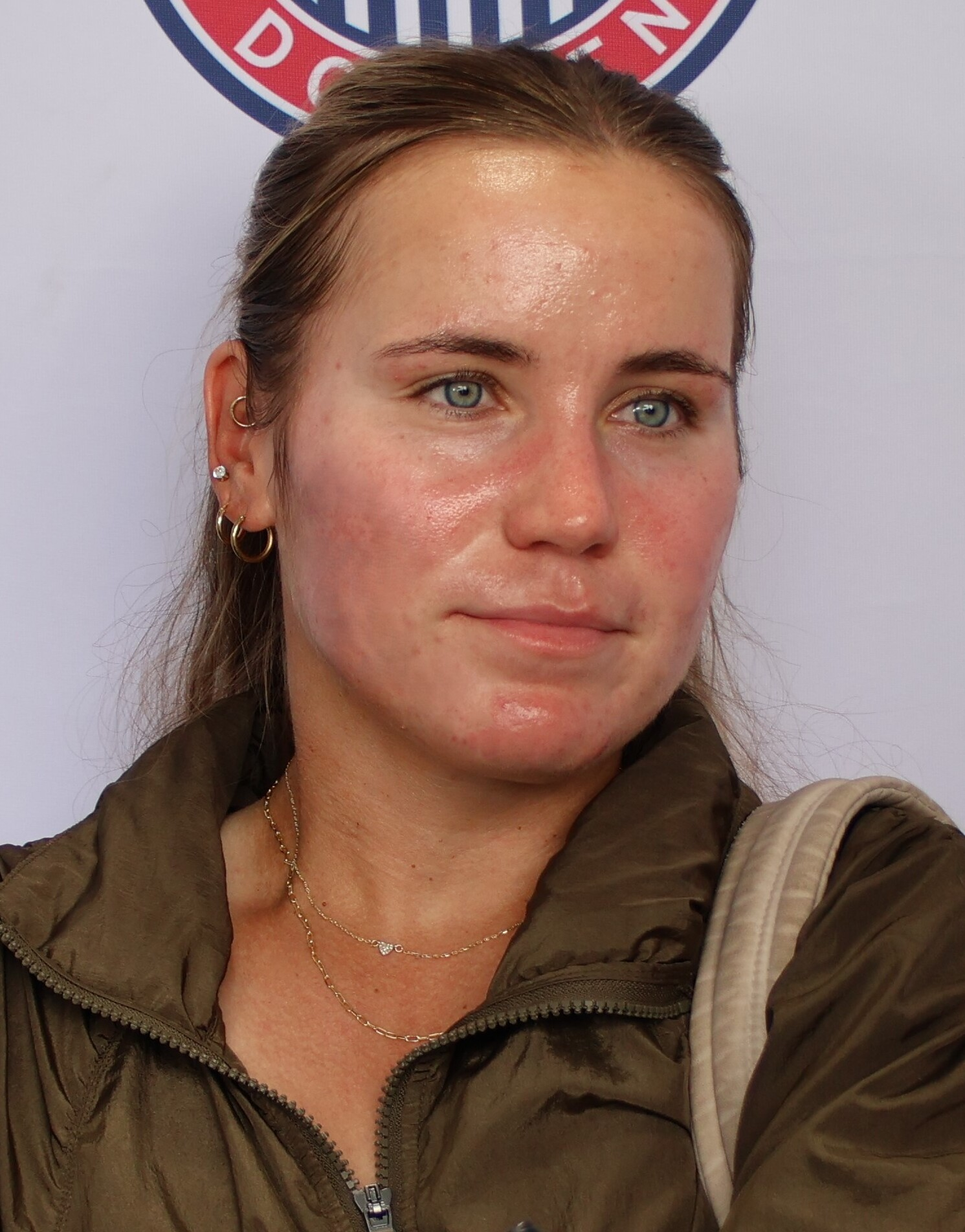
- Kenin at the 2025 Washington Open
- Full name: Sofia Anna Kenin
- Native name: София Александровна Кенинa; Sofia Aleksandrovna Kenina
- Country (sports): United States
- Residence: Pembroke Pines, Florida, US
- Born: November 14, 1998 (age 27) Moscow, Russia
- Height: 5 ft 7 in (1.70 m)
- Turned pro: 5 September 2017
- Plays: Right-handed (two-handed backhand)
- Coach: Alex Kenin, Michael Joyce (2023)
- Prize money: US$ 11,669,924
- Official website: sonyakenin.com

Singles
- Career record: 301–209
- Career titles: 5
- Highest ranking: No. 4 (March 9, 2020)
- Current ranking: No. 187 (October 26, 2026)

Grand Slam singles results
- Australian Open: W (2020)
- French Open: F (2020)
- Wimbledon: 3R (2023)
- US Open: 4R (2020)

Other tournaments
- Tour Finals: RR (2019)

Doubles
- Career record: 107–98
- Career titles: 4
- Highest ranking: No. 21 (January 27, 2025)
- Current ranking: No. 66 (October 26, 2025)

Grand Slam doubles results
- Australian Open: 3R (2020, 2026)
- French Open: QF (2020)
- Wimbledon: QF (2025)
- US Open: 3R (2024)

Team competitions
- Fed Cup: F (2018), record 4–5
- Last updated on: 27 October 2025.

Sofia Anna "Sonya" Kenin (born November 14, 1998) is an American professional tennis player. She has been ranked as high as world No. 4 in singles by the WTA, and No. 21 in doubles. Kenin was named the 2020 WTA Player of the Year, an award earned by winning the Australian Open and finishing runner-up at the French Open. She has won five singles and four doubles titles on the WTA Tour, the latter including the 2019 China Open and 2024 Miami Open partnering Bethanie Mattek-Sands.

Coached primarily by her father, Kenin developed into a promising junior player, reaching No. 2 in the world after winning the Orange Bowl at the age of 16 and finishing runner-up in the 2015 US Open girls' singles event the following year. She also won the USTA Girls 18s National Championship during that summer. Kenin made her debut in the top 100 of the WTA rankings in 2018 as a teenager. She won her first three titles in 2019 and finished the year just outside the top 10, being named the WTA Most Improved Player of the Year. With her title at the 2020 Australian Open, Kenin became American No. 1 and the youngest American to win a Grand Slam women's singles title since Serena Williams in 1999.

== Early life and background ==
Sofia Kenin was born as Sofia Aleksandrovna Kenina in Moscow, Russia, to Alexander Kenin and Svetlana Kenina. Kenin is Jewish, and was born in a Jewish family, and has a younger sister. Her family moved to the United States a few months after she was born. They had previously left the Soviet Union to live in New York City in 1987 but returned to Russia for Kenin's birth so that other family members could help raise her initially. Her mother had worked as a nurse in the Soviet Union, and her parents had only $286 when they first moved to the United States.

Kenin began playing tennis at the age of five, drawing inspiration from her father who had played recreationally. Her parents recognized her potential and arranged for her to begin training with Rick Macci in Broward County, Florida. Macci coached Kenin for seven years until she was 12. He remarked: "Back then [when Kenin was five], I came right out and said Sofia was the scariest little creature I’d ever seen. It was unique: the hand-eye coordination and her ability to take the ball immediately right after the bounce. I have a lot of kids do that, but it was almost like it was baked in already, even though she was little and the racket was actually bigger than her. The only player I’ve seen like that is former world No. 1 Martina Hingis." Kenin has also worked with Nick Bollettieri. Her primary coach had always been her father except from May 2021 to November 2021. Her childhood tennis idols were Serena Williams and Maria Sharapova. Kenin particularly has praised Sharapova's fierce competitiveness.

Kenin had success in tennis at a young age, which garnered widespread attention in the tennis community and helped put her on the covers of tennis magazines. Kenin began playing in United States Tennis Association (USTA) girls' 10-and-under tournaments at the age of seven, and became the top-ranked player in Florida in that division. She later was ranked No. 1 in the USTA national rankings for each of the 12, 14, 16, and 18-and-under divisions. Kenin had the opportunity to interact with ATP and WTA tennis players as a young child, including hitting with Anna Kournikova at age seven, partnering with Jim Courier against Venus Williams and Todd Martin as part of an exhibition event, and receiving a tour of the Miami Open from Kim Clijsters.

== Junior years ==
Kenin reached a career-high of No. 2 in the ITF junior rankings. She began playing in low-level Grade-4 events on the ITF Junior Circuit in 2012 at the age of 13. After winning her first titles in both singles and doubles in 2013, she progressed to the Grade-1 level. Towards the end of the year, she made her Grade-A debut at the Orange Bowl, reaching the semifinals in singles and finishing runner-up in doubles with Kaitlyn McCarthy to Tornado Alicia Black and Naiktha Bains. Kenin made her junior Grand Slam debut in 2014, but only recorded one match win in singles while playing in the latter three events of the year. Following the US Open, Kenin represented the United States at the Junior Fed Cup along with CiCi Bellis and Black. The team won the tournament, sweeping Slovakia 3–0 in the final. Kenin went undefeated in her five matches, all in doubles. Her next breakthrough came toward the end of the year when she won the Orange Bowl, defeating Bellis and Ingrid Neel in the last two rounds.

Kenin built on that success in 2015 by winning the USTA International Spring Championships, a Grade-1 tournament. During the summer, she won the USTA Girls 18s National Championship as the No. 3 seed, defeating top-seeded Black in the final. With the title, she earned a wild card into the main draw of the 2015 US Open. Kenin also participated in the junior event at the US Open and finished runner-up to Dalma Gálfi, her best performance at a junior Grand Slam event. This result helped her rise to No. 2 in the world by the end of the year. Kenin continued to play on the junior tour in 2016 while primarily playing in professional events on the ITF Women's Circuit. At the US Open, she again produced one of her best results of the year, losing in the semifinals to Viktória Kužmová, after upsetting the top seed Anastasia Potapova in the previous round.

== Professional ==
=== 2013–17: US Open debut, three ITF titles ===
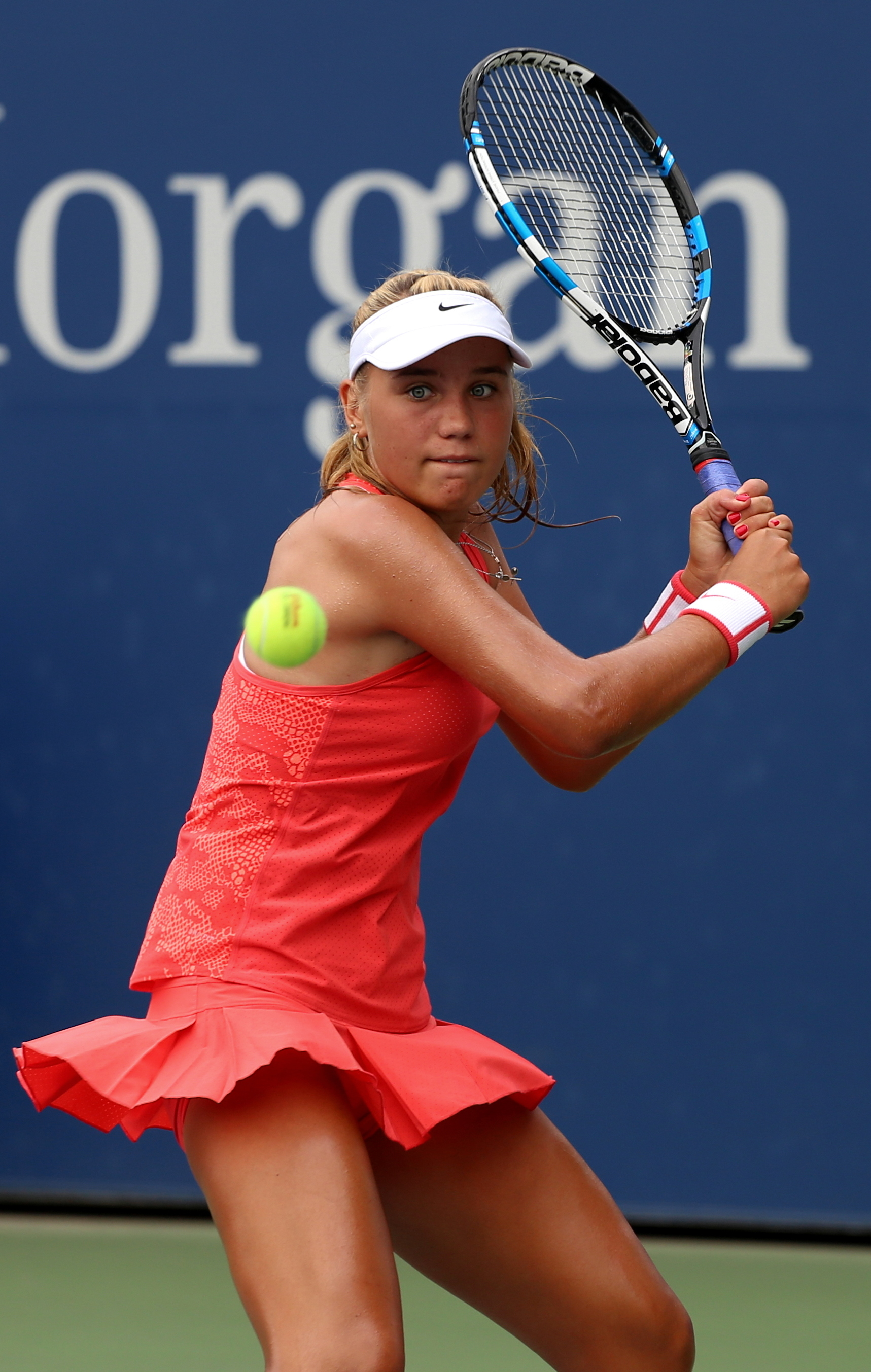
Kenin at the 2015 US Open

Kenin began playing low-level tournaments on the ITF Women's Circuit in 2013 and won her first two professional matches at the age of 14. With her wild card from winning the USTA Junior National Championship, she made her Grand Slam debut at the 2015 US Open, losing her opening match to Mariana Duque Mariño. The following year, Kenin won her first two ITF titles, the first at a $25k event in Wesley Chapel in Florida and the second at a $50k Sacramento Challenger in California. The latter title helped her win the US Open Wild Card Challenge to earn a wild card into the main draw of the US Open for the second time. At the US Open, she lost her first-round match to Karolína Plíšková, her only tour-level match of the year.

After beginning the 2017 season ranked outside the top 200, Kenin steadily rose up the WTA rankings throughout the year while playing exclusively on the professional circuit. She progressed into the top 150 in August after a string of good results during the summer, including winning the $60k Stockton Challenger and finishing runner-up at the $60k Lexington Challenger. These ITF performances helped her win the US Open Wild Card Challenge for the second straight year. At the 2017 US Open, Kenin advanced beyond the first round of a Grand Slam tournament for the first time, defeating compatriots Lauren Davis and Sachia Vickery, before losing to the 2006 champion Maria Sharapova in the third round. These were also her first two match wins on the WTA Tour. Kenin's success at the US Open helped convince her to turn professional in September, foregoing a scholarship to attend the University of Miami. She finished the year ranked No. 108 in the world.

=== 2018: Top 50, first top-10 victory ===
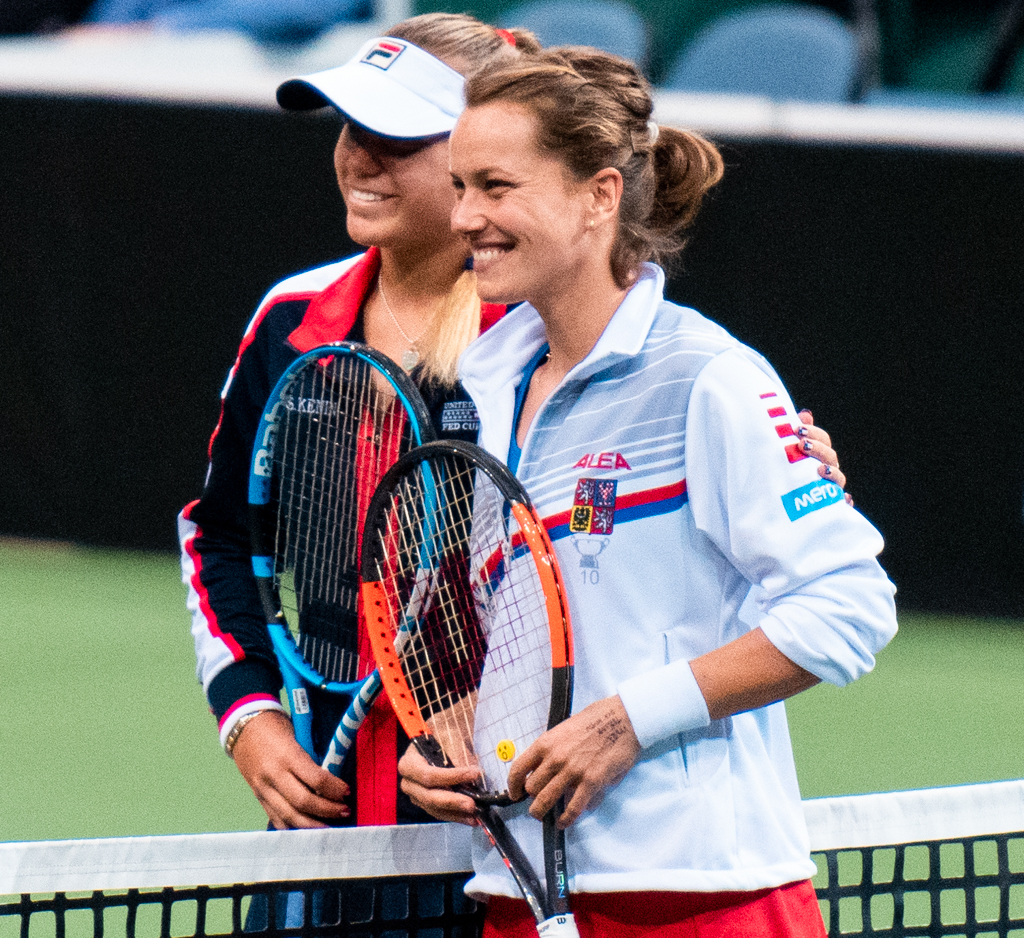
Kenin (left) and Barbora Strýcová in the 2018 Fed Cup final

With her improved ranking, Kenin was able to play primarily on the WTA Tour in 2018. She began the year by reaching her first WTA quarterfinal at the Auckland Open. After losing her first-round match at the Australian Open, Kenin produced good results at both Premier Mandatory events in March. She entered the top 100 by reaching the second round of the Indian Wells Open as a qualifier. She then qualified for the Miami Open, where she upset No. 11 Daria Kasatkina and reached the third round. After losing all five of her WTA Tour matches on clay across main draws and qualifying, Kenin reached her first WTA semifinal at the Mallorca Open on grass. She defeated top seed and world No. 6, Caroline Garcia, for her first career top-ten victory before losing to Tatjana Maria. Kenin closed out the grass-court season with a second-round appearance at Wimbledon, winning her debut at the event against Maria Sakkari.

Back in the United States, Kenin won another $60k title at the Berkeley Club Challenge. She reached the third round of the US Open for the second consecutive year, losing to Plíšková at the event for the second time. Kenin's best performance during the rest of the season came at the Tournoi de Québec, where she reached another semifinal. She defeated world No. 10, Julia Görges, at the Wuhan Open for her second top-ten victory of the year. So she advanced into the top 50 for the first time.

=== 2019: Three WTA Tour titles, world No. 12 ===
Kenin greatly improved in 2019, rising from outside the top 50 at the start of the year to just outside the top ten by the end of the season. She began her year by winning her first WTA doubles title at the Auckland Open with Eugenie Bouchard. The following week, she won her first WTA singles title at the Hobart International without dropping a set during the event. She upset the top seed and No. 19 Caroline Garcia in the first round, before defeating Anna Karolína Schmiedlová in the final. With this success, Kenin rose to what was at the time a career-best ranking of No. 37. At the Australian Open, she pushed world No. 1 Simona Halep to three sets in the second round, ultimately losing in a long two-hour-and-thirty-minute match. The following month, Kenin reached another WTA final at the Mexican Open, finishing runner-up to Wang Yafan despite being up a set and a break. During the clay-court season, Kenin improved on her results from the previous year. She reached the third round at the Italian Open, defeating compatriot Madison Keys before losing to Plíšková. Her best result on clay came at the French Open, where she reached the fourth round. During the event, she upset world No. 10, Serena Williams, in the third round before losing to eventual champion Ashleigh Barty.

In the grass-court season, Kenin won her second WTA singles title of the year at the Mallorca Open. She defeated three top-25 players in the final three rounds, all in three sets. She saved three championship points in the second set of the final against No. 13 Belinda Bencic, before coming from behind to win the match. Although she was seeded for the first time at a major at No. 27, she lost in the second round of Wimbledon to Dayana Yastremska. Kenin's best results of the US Open Series came at the two Premier 5 tournaments, where she reached the semifinals at both the Canadian Open and the Cincinnati Open, losing to the eventual champions at each but defeating the current world No. 1 players, Ashleigh Barty and Naomi Osaka, at each event, her first two victories over top-ranked players. She also became the first player to defeat the world No. 1 in back-to-back weeks since Lindsay Davenport had done so in 2001. Following these tournaments, Kenin again lost to Keys in the third round of the US Open.

During the Asian hardcourt swing, Kenin won one additional title in both singles and doubles. She won her third singles title of the year at the Guangzhou International Open, defeating Samantha Stosur in the final. Two weeks later, she partnered with Bethanie Mattek-Sands to win her second doubles title of the year at the China Open, a Premier Mandatory event. There, the pair defeated the team of Aryna Sabalenka and Elise Mertens, who were ranked No. 2 and No. 3 in the world, respectively, at the time. This title brought her to No. 43 in the doubles rankings. At the end of the season, Kenin qualified for the WTA Elite Trophy as the second seed, ranked No. 12 in the world. She won her opening match against compatriot Alison Riske, but lost to Karolína Muchová and did not advance out of her round-robin group. Kenin was also named the second alternate at the WTA Finals, behind Kiki Bertens. After Naomi Osaka and Bianca Andreescu both withdrew, she had the opportunity to play one match, losing to defending champion Elina Svitolina. She finished the year ranked No. 14 in singles and No. 39 in doubles. Kenin also received the WTA award Most Improved Player of the Year for her breakthrough season, becoming the first American player to win the award since Serena Williams in 1999.

=== 2020: Australian Open champion, world No. 4 ===
Kenin carried her success at the lower-level tournaments in 2019 to the Grand Slam tournaments in 2020. Despite two second-round losses to start the year, Kenin won the Australian Open for her first Grand Slam singles title. She only dropped one set before the final – in the fourth round against compatriot Coco Gauff. In the semifinal, she upset world No. 1 and home favorite Ash Barty. She then defeated Garbiñe Muguruza in the final, coming from a set down. With the victory at just 21 years old, she became the youngest American woman to win a major singles title since Serena Williams won Wimbledon in 2002. Serena won the US Open in 1999 at 17 years old. She also became the youngest American to make her top-ten debut in the WTA rankings since Williams in 1999, rising to No. 7 in the world. Kenin won another title at the inaugural Lyon Open, where she saved a match point in the second round and overcame a set and 5–2 deficit in the following round as part of a stretch of four consecutive three-set matches. She defeated Anna-Lena Friedsam in the final. This was Kenin's last event before the WTA Tour shut down for six months because of the COVID-19 pandemic. At this point, she was No. 4 in the world, her career-best ranking at the time.

When the tour resumed, Kenin was seeded second at the US Open as Barty and Halep had withdrawn because of the pandemic. Although she lost in the fourth round to Elise Mertens, this was her best result at the event to date. Following the tournament, Kenin traveled to Europe for the rescheduled clay-court season. Although she lost her only tune-up match to US Open runner-up Victoria Azarenka without winning a game, Kenin continued her Grand Slam tournament success at the French Open. She won four three-set matches during the first five rounds before defeating No. 11, Petra Kvitová, in the semifinals. She lost the final in straight sets to Iga Świątek. At the end of the season, Kenin was awarded the WTA Player of the Year.

Outside of the WTA Tour, Kenin has participated in World TeamTennis. She led the Philadelphia Freedoms to a first-place regular-season finish in 2020 with a 10–4 record in singles. Although she defeated CoCo Vandeweghe in the semifinals, her team lost to the eventual champions New York Empire.

=== 2021: Struggles with form ===
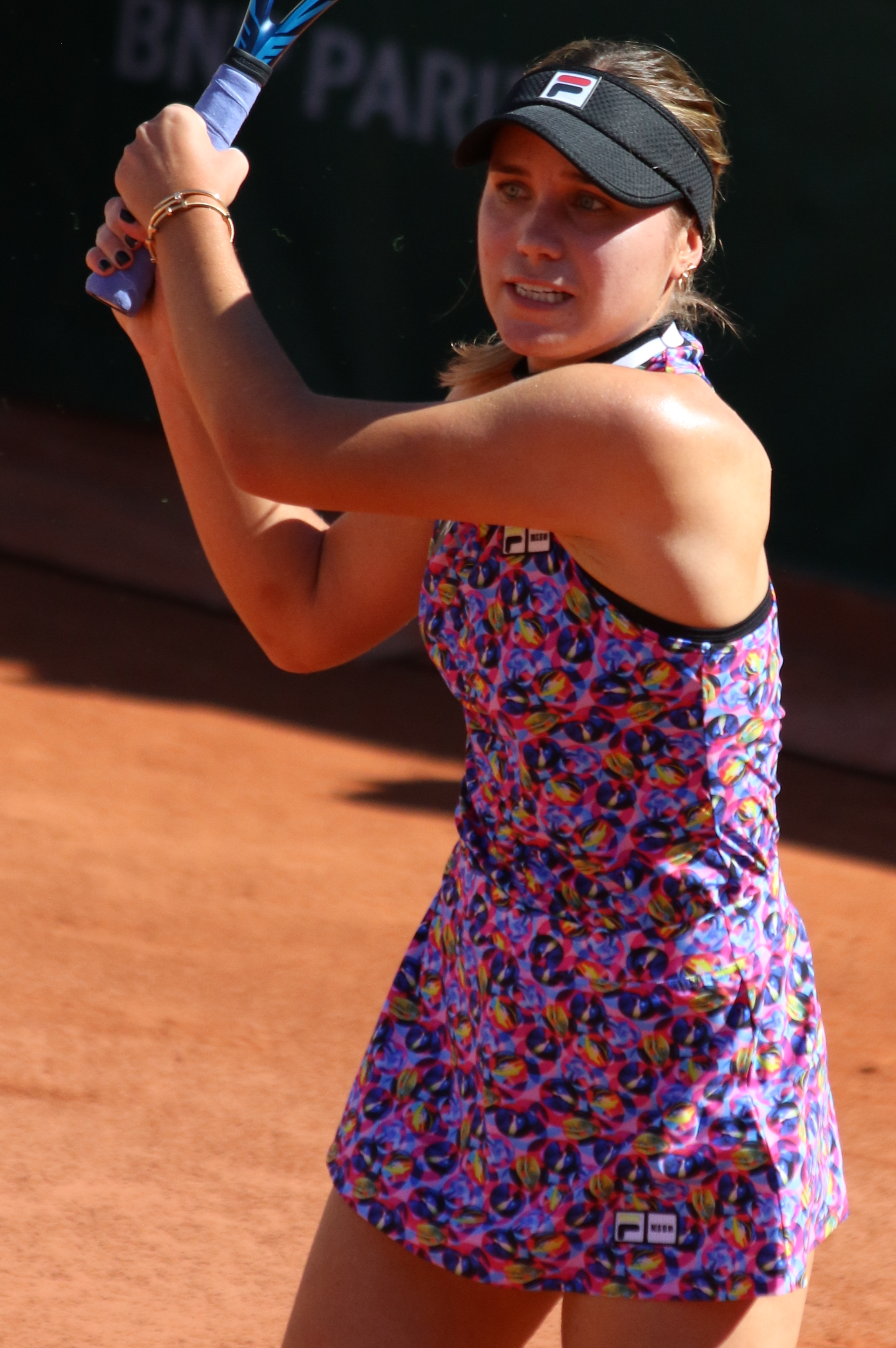
Kenin at the 2021 French Open

Kenin's first tournament of the year was at Abu Dhabi, where she was the top seed. She defeated Yang Zhaoxuan in the first round, and was the beneficiary of a retirement by Kirsten Flipkens in the second round. In the third round, Kenin saved a match point against Yulia Putintseva to progress to the quarterfinals, where she faced Maria Sakkari. After winning the first set 6–2, and with the score in the second set 2–2, Kenin lost ten games in a row, ending her run at Abu Dhabi. Her next tournament was the Yarra Valley Classic in Melbourne, where she defeated Camila Giorgi and Jessica Pegula to reach the quarterfinals. She met Garbiñe Muguruza in a rematch of the Australian Open final, but Kenin won just four games.

At the Australian Open, Kenin was the defending champion and fourth seed. She defeated Australian wild card player Maddison Inglis in the first round but was upset by the unseeded Kaia Kanepi in the second, in straight sets. Kenin's loss was the earliest for a defending champion at the Australian Open since Jennifer Capriati lost in the first round in 2003. After the match, Kenin tearfully admitted that the pressure of defending her title was overwhelming, saying: "I feel like everyone was always asking me: 'Would you want to? Do you see yourself getting [to Melbourne] and winning again?' Obviously I said yes. With the way I’m playing, no."

She then received a wild card for the Phillip Island Trophy, a tournament for players who suffered an early exit at the Australian Open, where she was the top seed and in receipt of a first-round bye. In the second round, Kenin was upset by the unranked Australian wild card Olivia Gadecki in three sets. Losing to Gadecki, whose career-high ranking was No. 988, marked Kenin's worst defeat by ranking on the WTA Tour. With her disappointing results throughout the Australian summer, her ranking would have fallen to No. 13 in the world, but because of changes to the system introduced as a result of the pandemic, this did not occur.

Withdrawing from numerous tournaments after suffering from appendicitis, Kenin made her return at Miami, where, with a first-round bye, she defeated Andrea Petkovic before falling to Ons Jabeur in three sets. At Charleston, she lost in her first match against Lauren Davis. She suffered a second-round defeat at Stuttgart to Anett Kontaveit, and lost her first match at Rome to Barbora Krejčíková. At the French Open, she reached the fourth round, defeating Jeļena Ostapenko, Hailey Baptiste and Jessica Pegula, before falling to Maria Sakkari.

In May 2021, Kenin announced that she was parting ways with her father as coach. Because of an injury, she did not participate in any warmup events before Wimbledon. At Wimbledon, she defeated Wang Xinyu in the first round before losing to Madison Brengle in the second round. In the loss, Kenin set a new Wimbledon record by committing 41 unforced errors in just 45 minutes.

On 9 November 2021, Kenin announced that her father had returned to her coaching team as she prepared for the 2022 Australian Open. She finished the year ranked No. 12 in singles.

=== 2022: Injury and hiatus, out of top 200 ===
Seeded 11th at the Australian Open, Kenin faced and lost to Madison Keys, in straight sets in the first round. Because she was defending the maximum points she earned from winning the tournament in 2020 rather than the 70 points she earned from losing in the second round in 2021 (due to the WTA rankings freeze along with the COVID-19 pandemic), her world ranking plummeted to No. 95 when updated following the conclusion of the tournament on 31 January 2022.

Kenin made her way to the quarterfinals of Adelaide 1 where she lost to the top-seeded Ashleigh Barty in straight sets, marking her first quarterfinal appearance since Melbourne 2021. Despite her run in Adelaide, Kenin lost five consecutive first-round matches with four of those five losses coming in straight sets.

She injured herself and pulled out of all the tournaments in March, April and May after the Indian Wells Open including the two majors, the French Open and Wimbledon. As a result, her ranking dropped outside the top 300.

She finished the year ranked No. 235.

=== 2023: WTA 1000 semifinal, top 30 ===
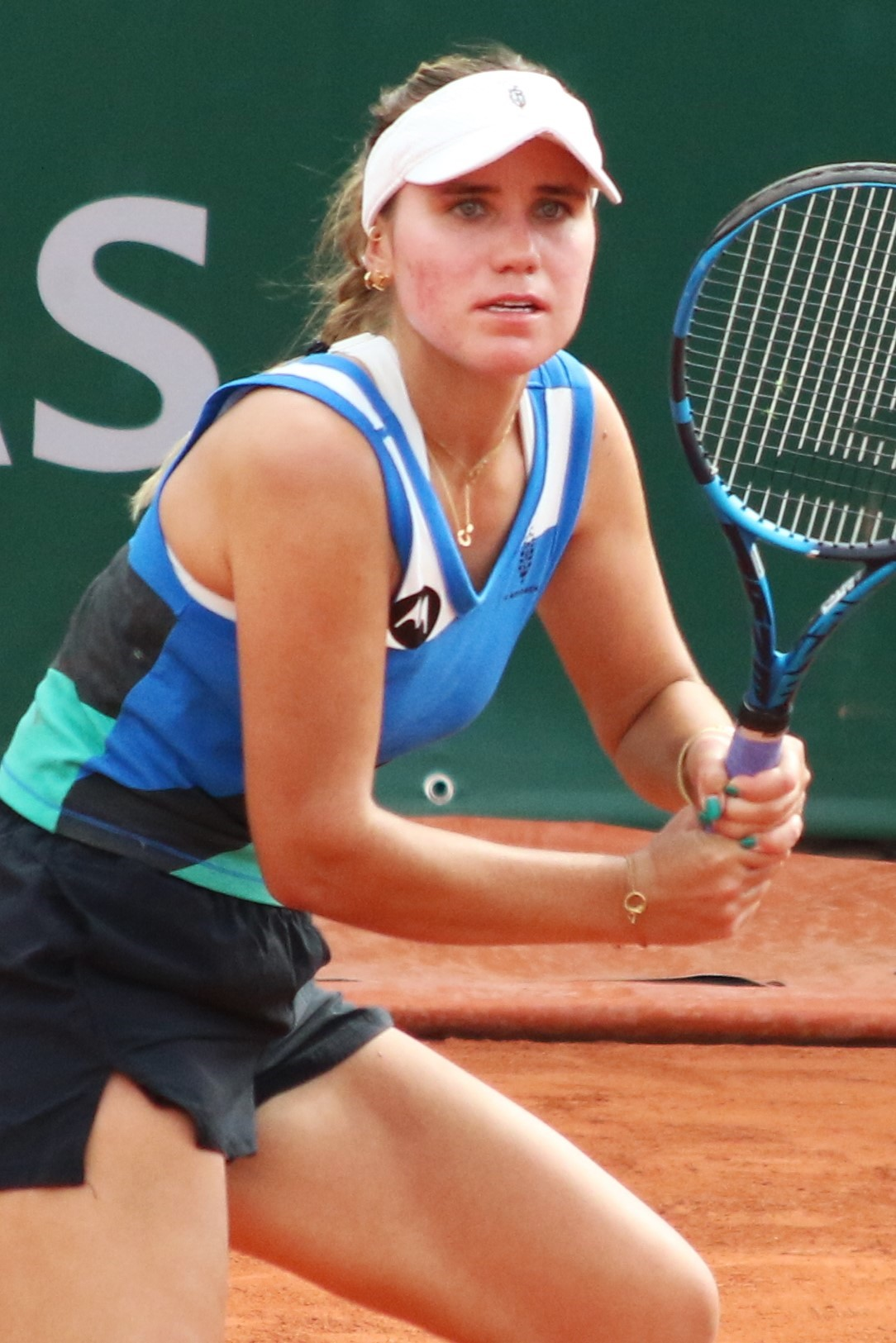
Kenin at the 2023 French Open

Kenin began her season at the Auckland Open, beating Wang Xinyu in the first round before losing to top seed and eventual champion Coco Gauff. She next reached her first tour-level semifinal since the 2020 French Open at the Hobart International. She lost to Elisabetta Cocciaretto in three sets. At the Australian Open, she lost in the first round to Victoria Azarenka in a match lasting more than two hours. She also lost in the first round of the 2023 Linz Open to Jule Niemeier.

She recorded her first top-20 win, again since the 2020 French Open by defeating world No. 15, Liudmila Samsonova, at the Qatar Ladies Open, in straight sets. She then lost to Veronika Kudermetova in the second round, and in the first round at Dubai to Marie Bouzková.

She reached the second round at Indian Wells, after defeating Sloane Stephens in the first, before losing to eventual champion Elena Rybakina in two close sets. At the Miami Open she went one step further, defeating Storm Hunter and 28th seed Anhelina Kalinina to reach the third round. She then lost to Bianca Andreescu. As a result, she moved back into the top 150 on 3 April 2023.

Kenin defeated Aliaksandra Sasnovich in Charleston to open her clay-court season, before losing to Irina-Camelia Begu. She was defeated by Maryna Zanevska in the first round of the Madrid Open.

At the Italian Open, Kenin defeated Cristina Bucșa in the opening round. She then recorded one of the biggest wins of her career by defeating world No. 2 and reigning Madrid champion, Aryna Sabalenka, in straight sets in the second round. This was her first top-5 win since defeating world No. 1, Ashleigh Barty, at the 2020 Australian Open during her run to the title.

She went through three qualifying rounds to make the main draw at the Wimbledon Championships. In the first round, she defeated seventh seed Coco Gauff. She lost in the third round to eventual semifinalist Elina Svitolina.

Following reaching her first singles final since 2020 at the San Diego Open as a wildcard where she lost to fourth seed Barbora Krejčíková, she moved 40 positions up close to the top 50.

At the Guadalajara Open, she reached her first WTA 1000 quarterfinal since 2019, defeating sixth seed Jeļena Ostapenko. Next, she defeated Leylah Fernandez to reach the semifinal, only her third in her career at a WTA 1000 level. She lost to world No. 111, Caroline Dolehide, in straight sets. As a result, she moved more than 20 positions up to world No. 31 on 25 September 2023. Following the China Open, she returned to the top 30 on 9 October 2023.

=== 2024: Miami doubles champion, back to top 100 in singles ===
Kenin lost her first match of the season at the Brisbane International to Arina Rodionova where she was the 14th seed. She then beat Greet Minnen, before losing to home favorite Daria Saville in the next round at the Hobart International. At the Australian Open, Kenin lost in the first round to top seed Iga Świątek.

Partnering with Bethanie Mattek Sands she won the Abu Dhabi Open, overcoming Linda Nosková and Heather Watson in the final. Entering as alternates, the pair won the Miami Open, defeating second seeds Gabriela Dabrowski and Erin Routliffe. As a result, she returned to the top 50 in the doubles rankings, on 1 April 2024. Kenin won her first tour-level singles match since January at the Italian Open, defeating Lucia Bronzetti in straight sets. During the match Kenin disagreed with the chair umpire and tournament supervisor's decision to keep players on court during rain, in response to the decision and boos from the crowd Kenin shouted expletives in both English and Russian, receiving an audible obscenity warning, before breaking Bronzetti to get the match back on serve. The match was suspended for rain immediately after. In the following round Kenin upset eighth seed Ons Jabeur for her first top 10 win of the season. Kenin would lose the next round to qualifier Rebecca Šramková, in three sets.

At the French Open, playing for the first time since 2021, she won her opening match in three sets over Laura Siegemund. Kenin then advanced to the third round with a victory over 21st seed and French No. 1 player, Caroline Garcia. In the third round, she lost to Clara Tauson in straight sets.

At the beginning of her grass-court season at the WTA 500 Eastbourne International, she entered the main draw as a lucky loser replacing top seed Elena Rybakina, directly into the second round where she lost to Harriet Dart in three sets. At Wimbledon, Kenin went out in the first round to world No. 1, Iga Świątek.

Kenin made it into the second round at the US Open by defeating Emma Raducanu but then lost to sixth seed Jessica Pegula. In October, at the Pan Pacific Open, she entered as a wildcard and reached her first singles semifinal in more than a year (since 2023 in Guadalajara) and then the final with wins over 10th seed Wang Xinyu, lucky loser Clara Tauson, third seed Daria Kasatkina and ninth seed Katie Boulter. As a result she returned to the top 100 on 28 October 2024 raising close to 70 positions up in the singles rankings, having been ranked No. 155 in the beginning of the tournament. Kenin lost the final to top seed Zheng Qinwen in straight sets. At the next and last Asian swing tournament of the season, the 2024 Hong Kong Tennis Open, Kenin reached back-to-back quarterfinals defeating Jessika Ponchet, having received a wildcard into the singles main draw.

=== 2025: Charleston singles, Washington doubles finals ===
Kenin reached the quarterfinals at the Hobart International with wins over fifth seed Lulu Sun and Anna Blinkova, before losing to wildcard entrant Maya Joint. At the Australian Open, she lost to third seed Coco Gauff in straight sets in the first round.

At the Charleston Open, Kenin reached the quarterfinals defeating fifth seed Daria Kasatkina. Next, she defeated 14th seed Anna Kalinskaya in straight sets to reach the semifinals. She reached her first clay final in five years defeating Amanda Anisimova after her retirement due to a back injury. Kenin lost the final to Jessica Pegula.

Seeded 31st, Kenin made it into the third round at the French Open, where she failed to convert three match points in her loss to seventh seed Madison Keys. Teaming up with Caroline Dolehide, she reached the doubles final at the Washington Open in July, losing to second seeds Taylor Townsend and Zhang Shuai in straight sets.

In October at the Pan Pacific Open in Tokyo, Kenin recorded wins over wildcard entrants Moyuka Uchijima and Wakana Sonobe, before defeating third seed Ekaterina Alexandrova to reach the quarterfinals, at which point she lost to fifth seed and eventual champion Belinda Bencic in three sets.

=== 2026: Continued struggles with form ===
Entering as the 27th seed, Kenin lost to compatriot, Peyton Stearns, in the first round of the Australian Open, giving her a 2-7 record at the tournament since her win in 2020. Kenin's loss at the Australian Open was her third in an eventual eight match losing streak which resulted in her world ranking falling out of the top 40. Despite intermittent match wins on clay in Charleston and Madrid, Kenin's world ranking dropped outside the top 100 after the French Open where she again lost to Stearns in the first round.

At Wimbledon, Kenin matched her previous year result with a confident straight sets win over Petra Marcinko in the first round before falling to the 2025 Wimbledon finalist, Amanda Anisimova in a third set tiebreak in the second round. Kenin received a wild card to directly enter the main draw of the US Open where she faced off against former U.S. Open Champion, Venus Williams, in the first round. Their match started at 12:13 a.m., which was the latest match start in the tournament's history. Kenin saved seven set points to hold off the 46-year-old in straight sets, but lost her second round match to 3rd seed, Jessica Pegula, in 56 minutes.

== National representation ==
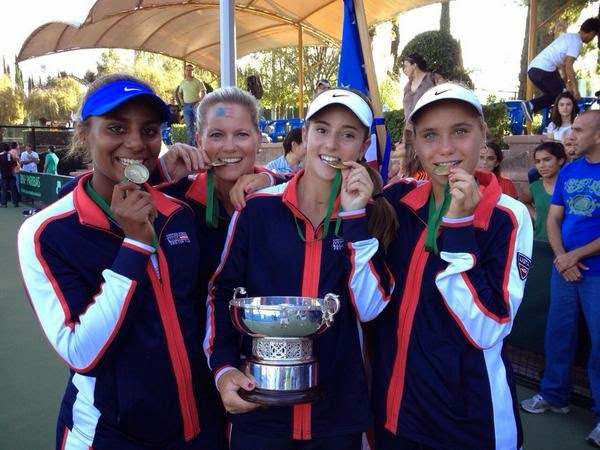
Kenin (right) with the 2014 Junior Fed Cup champion United States team

After winning the Junior Fed Cup in 2014, Kenin was nominated for her first senior Fed Cup tie in the 2018 final against the Czech Republic. Both teams were missing their best players, with the Williams sisters, Sloane Stephens, and Madison Keys for the United States, as well as Plíšková and Petra Kvitová for the Czech Republic all unavailable. Kenin and Alison Riske were selected to play singles against Barbora Strýcová and Kateřina Siniaková. Kenin lost both of her singles matches in three sets, as the Czech Republic swept the tie 3–0 to win the Fed Cup. The decisive third rubber between Kenin and Siniaková was particularly close. The match lasted 3 hours and 45 minutes, and ended with Siniaková needing to save two match points on Kenin's serve in the third set before coming from behind to win.

Kenin represented the United States again in 2019. In the first round against Australia, she lost her only match to Ashleigh Barty who won both of her singles rubbers as well as the decisive doubles rubber to lead Australia to a 3–2 victory. The United States' next tie was against Switzerland as part of the World Group play-offs. After Keys lost the first match and Stephens won both of her singles rubbers, Kenin was selected to play the last singles rubber against Timea Bacsinszky. Kenin defeated Bacsinszky to win the tie 3–1 and keep the United States in the World Group for 2020.

With a new format in 2020 and the name of the Fed Cup competition changing to the Billie Jean King Cup mid-season, Kenin played in the Qualifying round in a tie against Latvia a week after winning the 2020 Australian Open. After defeating Anastasija Sevastova and losing to Jeļena Ostapenko, Kenin partnered with Bethanie Mattek-Sands to defeat the two of them in the decisive doubles rubber. The United States advanced to the Billie Jean King Cup Finals where they were drawn in a round-robin group with Spain and Slovakia.

In 2023 Kenin was selected by captain Kathy Rinaldi in the final event of her captaincy. Kenin played for the team at first singles given the team was missing both Gauff, Pegula, and Keys. She won her first tie, a three set epic against defending champion Switzerland's Viktorija Golubic, but lost to Wimbledon champion Marketa Vondrousova only winning two games in the tie against the Czech Republic. Danielle Collins did well at second singles winning both her ties, but failed to clutch the tie against the Czech Republic alongside Taylor Townsend in the deciding doubles. Team USA, after winning the tie over Switzerland 3-0 and losing to the Czech Republic 1-2, finished 2nd in the group and did not advance to the semifinals. Team USA is one of eight finalists for the Billie Jean Cup 2025 to be held in China in September.

== Playing style ==
Kenin has an aggressive style of play that is built around incorporating a variety of shots into her game rather than just power. She plays primarily from the baseline and can hit winners with both her forehand and backhand. She excels at disguising whether her backhand is going cross-court or down the line. Two of Kenin's best shots are her backhand down the line and her inside-in forehand. Kenin can strategically add slice to her backhand, which she may use to hit well-disguised drop shot winners. On occasion, she can also hit slice forehands, a rare shot in modern tennis. On the defensive side, Kenin is capable of hitting her forehand even as high as shoulder height. Petra Kvitová noticed Kenin's aggressive and determined style of play in early 2018, a trait that Kenin's father said that she had developed in 2017, her first full year on the professional tour. She had previously been described by Maria Sharapova as more of a "grinder," that is, a counter-puncher who has good movement and gets a lot of balls back in play without trying to end points.

One of the keys to Kenin's style of play is consistency, in particular with redirecting shots. Her childhood coach Rick Macci has praised her determination. He has called her "the mosquito," saying, "She’s just there the whole time, bothering you. She’s had this innate mental strength since she was a little kid. It was already baked in there." Macci also stated: "Her timing of the ball is better than anybody I ever taught. You’ll notice she’s not out of balance that much, and she can take the ball right off the bounce like a wizard. Everyone can hit deep, but the angles she gets, even while taking the ball early, are so acute that she gets you off the court, and then she goes for the jugular." Kenin has an unusual service motion in that she looks downward initially during her ball toss.

== Endorsements ==
Between 2018 and 2022, Kenin was endorsed by Fila for her clothing and shoes, having previously been sponsored by Nike. Since 2022, Kenin has been sponsored by the American athletics company Free People Movement. Kenin's racket sponsor is Babolat, and she uses the Pure Drive model. In January 2021, Kenin signed an endorsement deal with American consumer electronics and telecommunications company Motorola. In May 2021 Kenin was announced as a brand ambassador for the fitness kinesio-therapeutic tape brand KT Tape.

== Career statistics ==
=== Grand Slam tournament performance timelines ===
Key
W	F	SF	QF	#R	RR	Q#	DNQ	A	NH

(W) winner; (F) finalist; (SF) semifinalist; (QF) quarterfinalist; (#R) rounds 4, 3, 2, 1; (RR) round-robin stage; (Q#) qualification round; (DNQ) did not qualify; (A) absent; (NH) not held; (SR) strike rate (events won / competed); (W–L) win–loss record.
To avoid confusion and double counting, these charts are updated at the conclusion of a tournament or when the player's participation has ended.

==== Singles ====
Tournament	2015	2016	2017	2018	2019	2020	2021	2022	2023	2024	2025	2026	SR	W–L	Win %
Australian Open	A	A	A	1R	2R	W	2R	1R	1R	1R	1R	1R	1 / 9	9–8	53%
French Open	A	A	A	1R	4R (Note: Kenin received a walkover in the second round of 2019 French Open, which does not count as a win.)	F	4R	A	Q1	3R	3R	1R	0 / 7	15–7	68%
Wimbledon	A	A	Q1	2R	2R	NH	2R	A	3R	1R	2R	2R	0 / 7	7–7	50%
US Open	1R	1R	3R	3R	3R	4R	A	1R	2R	2R	1R	2R	0 / 11	12–11	52%
Win–loss	0–1	0–1	2–1	3–4	6–4	16–2	5–3	0–2	3–3	3–4	3–4	2–4	1 / 34	43–33	57%

==== Doubles ====
Tournament	2018	2019	2020	2021	2022	2023	2024	2025	2026	SR	W–L	Win %
Australian Open	A	1R	3R	1R	1R	1R	1R	1R	3R	0 / 8	5–8	38%
French Open	A	2R	QF	A	A	A	2R	1R	1R	0 / 5	5–5	50%
Wimbledon	2R	1R	NH	1R	A	A	3R	QF (Note: Kenin received a walkover in the third round of 2025 Wimbledon, which does not count as a win.)	2R	0 / 6	6–6	50%
US Open	1R	1R	2R	A	1R	1R	3R	1R	1R	0 / 8	3–8	27%
Win–loss	1–2	1–4	6–3	0–2	0–2	0–2	5–4	2–4	3–4	0 / 27	18–27	40%

=== Grand Slam tournament finals ===
==== Singles: 2 (1 title, 1 runner-up) ====
Result	Year	Championship	Surface	Opponent	Score
Win	2020	Australian Open	Hard	(Spain) Garbiñe Muguruza	4–6, 6–2, 6–2
Loss	2020	French Open	Clay	(Poland) Iga Świątek	4–6, 1–6

=== Other significant finals ===
==== WTA Premier/1000 tournaments ====
===== Doubles: 2 (2 titles) =====
Result	Year	Tournament	Surface	Partner	Opponent	Score
Win	2019	China Open	Hard	(United States) Bethanie Mattek-Sands	(Latvia) Jeļena Ostapenko (Ukraine) Dayana Yastremska	6–3, 6–7^{(5–7)}, [10–7]
Win	2024	Miami Open	Hard	(United States) Bethanie Mattek-Sands	(Canada) Gabriela Dabrowski (New Zealand) Erin Routliffe	4–6, 7–6^{(7–5)}, [11–9]

== See also ==
- List of select Jewish tennis players

Sporting positions
Preceded by (Russia) Varvara Flink	Orange Bowl Girls' Singles Champion; Category: 18 and under 2014	Succeeded by (Canada) Bianca Andreescu
