= 2023 Prague Open =

Women's tennis tournament

- Date: 31 July – 6 August
- Edition: 14th
- Category: WTA 250
- Draw: 32S / 16D
- Surface: Hard / outdoor
- Location: Prague, Czech Republic
- Venue: TK Sparta Prague

Champions

Singles
- (Japan) Nao Hibino

Doubles
- (Japan) Nao Hibino / (Georgia (country)) Oksana Kalashnikova
- WTA Prague Open

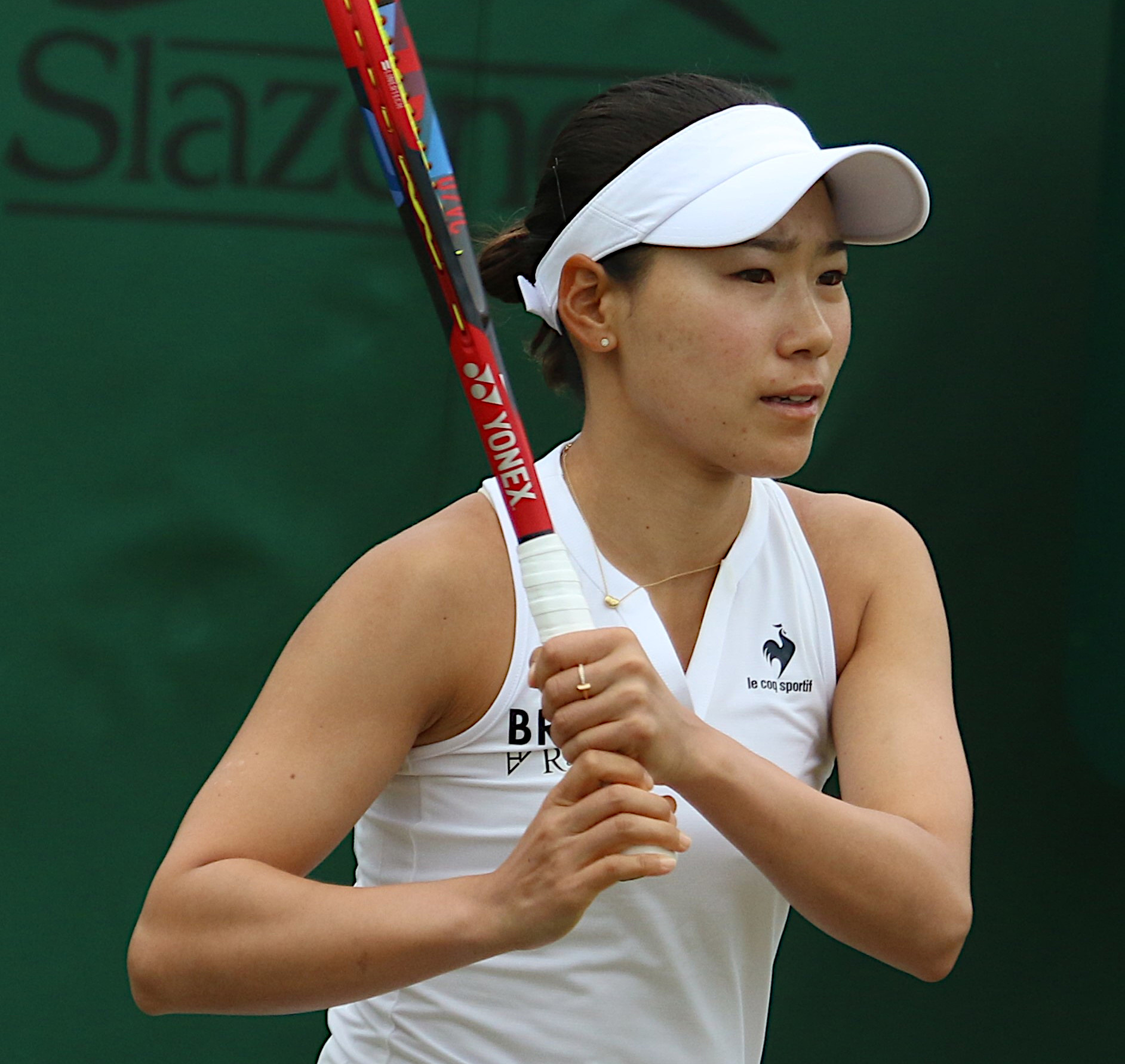

The 2023 Prague Open, branded as the 2023 Livesport Prague Open for sponsorship reasons, was a professional women's tennis tournament played on outdoor hard courts at the TK Sparta Prague. It was the 14th (WTA and non-WTA) edition of the tournament and part of the 2023 WTA Tour, classified as a WTA 250 tournament. It took place in Prague, Czech Republic from 31 July to 6 August 2023.

== Exclusion of Russian and Belarusian players ==
Ahead of the tournament, the Czech police prevented the Russian player Anastasia Pavlyuchenkova from entering the country. Russian and Belarusian players were subsequently asked not to travel to Czechia and were forced to withdraw from the tournament. They would have competed as neutrals, without any national flag or symbol, but the Czech government passed a resolution banning all Russian and Belarusian athletes from entering the country due to the Russian invasion of Ukraine.

== Finals ==
=== Singles ===
- (Japan) Nao Hibino defeated (Czech Republic) Linda Nosková 6–4, 6–1

=== Doubles ===
- (Japan) Nao Hibino / (Georgia (country)) Oksana Kalashnikova defeated (United States) Quinn Gleason / (France) Elixane Lechemia 6–7^{(7–9)}, 7–5, [10–3]

== Singles main draw entrants ==
=== Seeds ===
Country	Player	Rank^{†}	Seed
CZE	Marie Bouzková	29	1
CHN	Zhu Lin	38	2
CHN	Zhang Shuai	45	3
CZE	Linda Nosková	59	4
~~GER~~	~~Tatjana Maria~~	~~65~~	~~5~~
FRA	Alizé Cornet	70	6
CHN	Wang Xinyu	71	7
UKR	Kateryna Baindl	77	8
CHN	Wang Xiyu	80	9

^{†} Rankings are as of 24 July 2023.

=== Other entrants ===
The following players received wildcard entry into the singles main draw:

- (Czech Republic) Lucie Havlíčková
- (Czech Republic) Tereza Martincová
- (Czech Republic) Barbora Palicová

The following players received entry with a protected ranking:

- (Romania) Jaqueline Cristian
- (Czech Republic) Barbora Strýcová
- (Romania) Patricia Maria Țig

The following player received entry as a special exempt:

- (United Kingdom) Heather Watson

The following players received entry from the qualifying draw:

- (Colombia) Emiliana Arango
- (Slovakia) Viktória Hrunčáková
- (United States) Elvina Kalieva
- (Czech Republic) Gabriela Knutson
- (Germany) Tamara Korpatsch
- (Ukraine) Dayana Yastremska

The following players received entry as lucky losers:

- (Japan) Nao Hibino
- (India) Ankita Raina

=== Withdrawals ===
- (Czech Republic) Barbora Krejčíková → replaced by (Estonia) Kaia Kanepi
- (Slovakia) Kristína Kučová → replaced by (Italy) Lucrezia Stefanini
- (Germany) Tatjana Maria → replaced by (India) Ankita Raina
- (Spain) Rebeka Masarova → replaced by (Japan) Nao Hibino
- Evgeniya Rodina → replaced by (Germany) Jule Niemeier
- Aliaksandra Sasnovich → replaced by (China) Yuan Yue

== Doubles main draw entrants ==
=== Seeds ===
Country	Player	Country	Player	Rank^{†}	Seed
CHN	Zhang Shuai	CHN	Zhu Lin	129	1
GBR	Alicia Barnett	GBR	Olivia Nicholls	145	2
CZE	Anastasia Dețiuc	CZE	Anna Sisková	187	3
GBR	Naiktha Bains	GBR	Maia Lumsden	198	4

^{†} Rankings are as of 24 July 2023.

=== Other entrants ===
The following pairs received wildcard entry into the doubles main draw:

- (Czech Republic) Nikola Bartůňková / (Czech Republic) Tereza Valentová
- (Czech Republic) Barbora Palicová / (Czech Republic) Dominika Šalková

=== Withdrawals ===
- (Czech Republic) Lucie Havlíčková / (Czech Republic) Miriam Kolodziejová → replaced by (Thailand) Luksika Kumkhum / (Thailand) Peangtarn Plipuech
