= 2023 Prague Open – Doubles =

Doubles
- 2023 Prague Open

Final
- Champions: (Japan) Nao Hibino (Georgia (country)) Oksana Kalashnikova
- Runners-up: (United States) Quinn Gleason (France) Elixane Lechemia
- Score: 6–7^{(7–9)}, 7–5, [10–3]

Details
- Draw: 16
- Seeds: 4

Events
Singles	Doubles
← 2022 ·	WTA Prague Open	· 2024 →

Nao Hibino and Oksana Kalashnikova defeated Quinn Gleason and Elixane Lechemia in the final, 6–7^{(7–9)}, 7–5, [10–3] to win the doubles tennis title at the 2023 Prague Open. It was the second time that Hibino won the singles and doubles titles at the same WTA Tour tournament, following the 2019 Japan Women's Open.

Anastasia Potapova and Yana Sizikova were the reigning champions, but did not participate this year.

== Seeds ==
1. (China) Zhang Shuai / (China) Zhu Lin (quarterfinals)
2. (United Kingdom) Alicia Barnett / (United Kingdom) Olivia Nicholls (quarterfinals)
3. (Czech Republic) Anastasia Dețiuc / (Czech Republic) Anna Sisková (first round)
4. (United Kingdom) Naiktha Bains / (United Kingdom) Maia Lumsden (first round)

== Draw ==
=== Key ===
- Q = Qualifier
- WC = Wild card
- LL = Lucky loser
- Alt = Alternate
- SE = Special exempt
- PR = Protected ranking
- ITF = ITF entry
- JE = Junior exempt
- w/o = Walkover
- r = Retired
- d = Defaulted
- SR = Special ranking

=== Draw ===
First round
1	(China) S Zhang (China) L Zhu	6	6^{4}	[10]
(Czech Republic) R Voráčová (China) Xiy Wang	2	7^{7}	[8]
(United States) J Aney (United States) A Rogers	2	4
WC	(Czech Republic) B Palicová (Czech Republic) D Šalková	6	6
3	(Czech Republic) A Dețiuc (Czech Republic) A Sisková	7^{9}	3	[7]
(Venezuela) A Gámiz (United Kingdom) H Watson	6^{7}	6	[10]
Alt	(Thailand) L Kumkhum (Thailand) P Plipuech	4	6	[6]
(Japan) N Hibino (Georgia (country)) O Kalashnikova	6	3	[10]
PR	(Romania) J Cristian (Belgium) G Minnen	2	6	[11]
WC	(Czech Republic) N Bartůňková (Czech Republic) T Valentová	6	3	[13]
(Germany) J Lohoff (Germany) J Niemeier	6	7
4	(United Kingdom) N Bains (United Kingdom) M Lumsden	4	5
(United States) Q Gleason (France) E Lechemia	6	6
(United Kingdom) F Christie (United Kingdom) A Collins	2	4
(Germany) V Heisen (Australia) O Tjandramulia	3	4
2	(United Kingdom) A Barnett (United Kingdom) O Nicholls	6	6

Quarterfinals
1	(China) S Zhang (China) L Zhu	4	4
WC	(Czech Republic) B Palicová (Czech Republic) D Šalková	6	6
(Venezuela) A Gámiz (United Kingdom) H Watson	4	6	[7]
(Japan) N Hibino (Georgia (country)) O Kalashnikova	6	3	[10]
WC	(Czech Republic) N Bartůňková (Czech Republic) T Valentová	w/o
(Germany) J Lohoff (Germany) J Niemeier
(United States) Q Gleason (France) E Lechemia	7	7
2	(United Kingdom) A Barnett (United Kingdom) O Nicholls	5	5

Semifinals
WC	(Czech Republic) B Palicová (Czech Republic) D Šalková	1	2
(Japan) N Hibino (Georgia (country)) O Kalashnikova	6	6
WC	(Czech Republic) N Bartůňková (Czech Republic) T Valentová	1	6	[9]
(United States) Q Gleason (France) E Lechemia	6	3	[11]

Final
(Japan) N Hibino (Georgia (country)) O Kalashnikova	6^{7}	7	[10]
(United States) Q Gleason (France) E Lechemia	7^{9}	5	[3]
