= 2019 Japan Women's Open – Singles =

Singles
- 2019 Japan Women's Open

Final
- Champion: (Japan) Nao Hibino
- Runner-up: (Japan) Misaki Doi
- Score: 6–3, 6–2

Events
Singles	Doubles
- Japan Women's Open

Hsieh Su-wei was the defending champion, but lost to Nao Hibino in the quarterfinals.

Hibino went on to win the title, defeating Misaki Doi in the final, 6–3, 6–2.

== Seeds ==
1. (Chinese Taipei) Hsieh Su-wei (quarterfinals)
2. (Russia) Veronika Kudermetova (semifinals)
3. (Belgium) Alison Van Uytvanck (quarterfinals)
4. (Russia) Anastasia Potapova (first round)
5. (Germany) Tatjana Maria (first round)
6. (Kazakhstan) Zarina Diyas (second round, retired)
7. (Spain) Sara Sorribes Tormo (quarterfinals)
8. (Germany) Laura Siegemund (quarterfinals)

== Draw ==
Key

- Q = Qualifier
- WC = Wild card
- LL = Lucky loser
- Alt = Alternate
- ITF = ITF entry
- PR = Protected ranking
- SR = Special ranking
- SE = Special exempt
- JE = Junior exempt
- JR = Junior Accelerator Programme entrant
- CO = College Accelerator Programme entrant
- NG = Next Gen Accelerator Program entrant
- w/o = Walkover
- r = Retired
- d = Defaulted

=== Finals ===
Semifinals
(Japan) Nao Hibino	4	6	6
(Romania) Mihaela Buzărnescu	6	0	3
(Japan) Misaki Doi	6	6
2	(Russia) Veronika Kudermetova	4	3

Final
(Japan) Nao Hibino	6	6
(Japan) Misaki Doi	3	2

=== Top half ===
First round
1	(Chinese Taipei) S-w Hsieh	6	3	6
WC	(Japan) R Ozaki	1	6	3
(Poland) K Kawa	0	6	4
(Australia) P Hon	6	1	6
Q	(Canada) LA Fernandez	7^{7}	6^{5}	5
(Japan) N Hibino	6^{2}	7^{7}	7
(Montenegro) D Kovinić	2	2
6	(Kazakhstan) Z Diyas	6	6
3	(Belgium) A Van Uytvanck	6	6
(Belgium) Y Bonaventure	4	2
(Russia) L Samsonova	6^{2}	4
(Belgium) K Flipkens	7^{7}	6
(Romania) M Buzărnescu	6	6
Q	(Bulgaria) V Tomova	1	4
WC	(Japan) K Nara	6	6
5	(Germany) T Maria	4	4

Second round
1	(Chinese Taipei) S-w Hsieh	1	7^{7}	7
(Australia) P Hon	6	6^{2}	5
(Japan) N Hibino	6	3
6	(Kazakhstan) Z Diyas	1	2^{r}
3	(Belgium) A Van Uytvanck	6	3	6
(Belgium) K Flipkens	2	6	3
(Romania) M Buzărnescu	7^{7}	7
WC	(Japan) K Nara	6^{1}	5

Quarterfinals
1	(Chinese Taipei) S-w Hsieh	4	3
(Japan) N Hibino	6	6
3	(Belgium) A Van Uytvanck	4	5
(Romania) M Buzărnescu	6	7

Semifinals
(Japan) N Hibino	4	6	6
(Romania) M Buzărnescu	6	0	3

=== Bottom half ===
First round
7	(Spain) S Sorribes Tormo	6	3	6
(Romania) S Cîrstea	2	6	2
(Russia) V Flink	6	6
(Slovakia) K Kučová	3	2
(Japan) M Doi	4	7	6
Q	(Japan) J Namigata	6	5	2
Q	(Australia) Z Hives	6^{4}	6	6
4	(Russia) A Potapova	7^{7}	4	4
8	(Germany) L Siegemund	6	6
Q	(Russia) V Savinykh	4	1
Q	(Romania) PM Țig	6	6
WC	(Japan) A Shimizu	4	2
(United States) C McHale	6	6
(Belgium) G Minnen	2	4
(United States) V Lepchenko	4	2
2	(Russia) V Kudermetova	6	6

Second round
7	(Spain) S Sorribes Tormo	6	6
(Russia) V Flink	3	1
(Japan) M Doi	6	1	6
Q	(Australia) Z Hives	1	6	3
8	(Germany) L Siegemund	6	5	7
Q	(Romania) PM Țig	2	7	5
(United States) C McHale	6^{7}	2
2	(Russia) V Kudermetova	7^{9}	6

Quarterfinals
7	(Spain) S Sorribes Tormo	5	1
(Japan) M Doi	7	6
8	(Germany) L Siegemund	3	6	2
2	(Russia) V Kudermetova	6	4	6

Semifinals
(Japan) M Doi	6	6
2	(Russia) V Kudermetova	4	3

== Qualifying ==
=== Seeds ===
1. (Romania) Patricia Maria Țig (qualified)
2. (South Korea) Han Na-lae (qualifying competition)
3. (Australia) Zoe Hives (qualified)
4. (Bulgaria) Viktoriya Tomova (qualified)
5. (Russia) Valeria Savinykh (qualified)
6. (Australia) Destanee Aiava (first round)
7. (Japan) Mayo Hibi (qualifying competition)
8. (Spain) Georgina García Pérez (first round)
9. (Canada) Leylah Annie Fernandez (qualified)
10. (Japan) Yuki Naito (first round)
11. (South Korea) Jang Su-jeong (qualifying competition)
12. (Japan) Miharu Imanishi (qualifying competition)

=== Qualifiers ===
1. (Romania) Patricia Maria Țig
2. (Canada) Leylah Annie Fernandez
3. (Australia) Zoe Hives
4. (Bulgaria) Viktoriya Tomova
5. (Russia) Valeria Savinykh
6. (Japan) Junri Namigata

=== Draw ===
==== First qualifier ====
First round
1	(Romania) Patricia Maria Țig	3	7	6
(Japan) Chihiro Muramatsu	6	5	3
(Japan) Kyōka Okamura	6	6
10	(Japan) Yuki Naito	2	4

Qualifying competition
1	(Romania) Patricia Maria Țig	6	6
(Japan) Kyōka Okamura	1	1

==== Second qualifier ====
First round
2	(South Korea) Han Na-lae	7^{7}	3
WC	(Japan) Miyu Kato	6^{1}	2^{r}
(Japan) Erina Hayashi	0	4
9	(Canada) Leylah Annie Fernandez	6	6

Qualifying competition
2	(South Korea) Han Na-lae	3	2
9	(Canada) Leylah Annie Fernandez	6	6

==== Third qualifier ====
First round
3	(Australia) Zoe Hives	3	6	7^{7}
(Japan) Akiko Omae	6	2	6^{5}
(Japan) Mai Hontama	4	6	4
12	(Japan) Miharu Imanishi	6	2	6

Qualifying competition
3	(Australia) Zoe Hives	6	6
12	(Japan) Miharu Imanishi	3	4

==== Fourth qualifier ====
First round
4	(Bulgaria) Viktoriya Tomova	6	6
(Japan) Ena Shibahara	4	1
WC	(Japan) Himari Sato	1	2
7	(Japan) Mayo Hibi	6	6

Qualifying competition
4	(Bulgaria) Viktoriya Tomova	4	6	6
7	(Japan) Mayo Hibi	6	4	2

==== Fifth qualifier ====
First round
5	(Russia) Valeria Savinykh	6	2
WC	(Japan) Ayumi Morita	2	3^{r}
PR	(Sweden) Susanne Celik	4	4
11	(South Korea) Jang Su-jeong	6	6

Qualifying competition
5	(Russia) Valeria Savinykh	6	7
11	(South Korea) Jang Su-jeong	4	5

==== Sixth qualifier ====
First round
6	(Australia) Destanee Aiava	2	4
(Japan) Junri Namigata	6	6
WC	(Japan) Moyuka Uchijima	2	6	6
8	(Spain) Georgina García Pérez	6	3	0

Qualifying competition
(Japan) Junri Namigata	6	2	6
WC	(Japan) Moyuka Uchijima	2	6	4
