= Misaki Doi =

Japanese tennis player (born 1991)

Misaki Doi 土居美咲
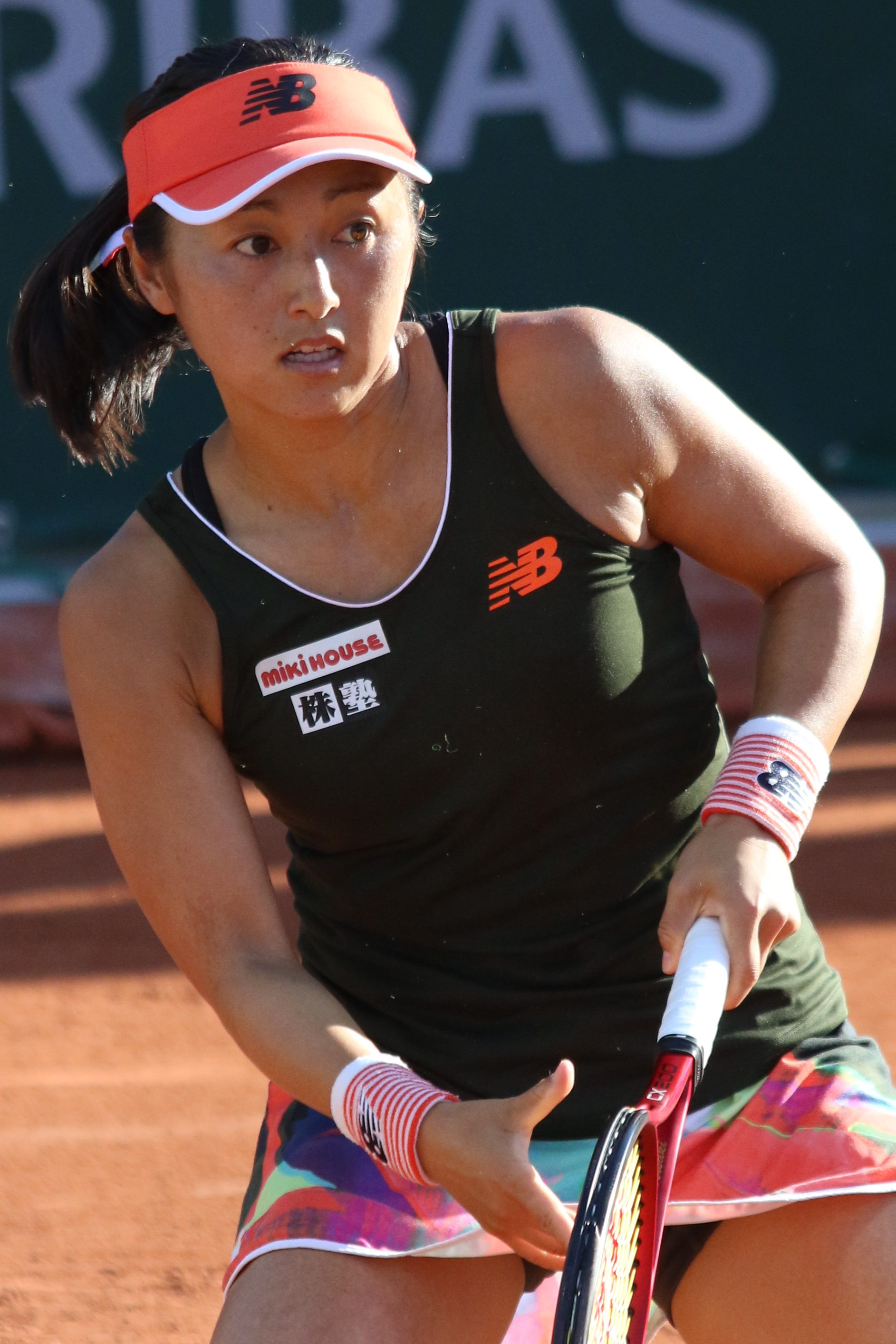
- Doi at the 2021 French Open
- Country (sports): Japan
- Residence: Tokyo, Japan
- Born: 29 April 1991 (age 35) Ōamishirasato, Japan
- Height: 1.59 m (5 ft 3 in)
- Turned pro: 2006
- Retired: September 2023
- Plays: Left (two-handed backhand)
- Coach: Christian Zahalka
- Prize money: US$ 3,946,733

Singles
- Career record: 404–378
- Career titles: 1
- Highest ranking: No. 30 (10 October 2016)

Grand Slam singles results
- Australian Open: 2R (2013)
- French Open: 2R (2015)
- Wimbledon: 4R (2016)
- US Open: 2R (2015, 2021)

Other tournaments
- Olympic Games: 2R (2021)

Doubles
- Career record: 148–119
- Career titles: 2
- Highest ranking: No. 77 (24 May 2021)

Grand Slam doubles results
- Australian Open: 2R (2020)
- French Open: 3R (2022)
- Wimbledon: 2R (2017, 2021)
- US Open: 2R (2017)

Team competitions
- Fed Cup: 11–12

Misaki Doi (土居 美咲, Doi Misaki; born 29 April 1991) is a Japanese former professional tennis player. Her highest WTA rankings are No. 30 in singles and No. 77 in doubles.

Doi reached two junior Grand Slam doubles finals – at Wimbledon in 2007 with Kurumi Nara, and at the Australian Open in 2008, with Elena Bogdan (losing both). She has made it to three WTA tournament finals (only winning one). She is managed by Muse Group, a sports marketing agency based in Tokyo.

== Junior years ==
Doi began playing tennis at the age of six. She first distinguished herself in tennis as a middle-school student, reaching the semifinals of the All Japan Middle School Tennis Championships in both 2004 and 2006 and joining the ITF Junior Circuit in 2006. In 2007, while enrolled as a freshman in Sundai Kōei High School, Doi earned second place in the Japan Open Junior Championships in Nagoya.

A highlight of Doi's junior career was her successful doubles partnership with age-mate Kurumi Nara. They placed second in girls' doubles at the 2007 Wimbledon Championships, becoming only the second Japanese pair to reach the finals of a Grand Slam juniors event since Yuka Yoshida and Hiroko Mochizuki at the 1993 US Open. Doi and Nara continued their run by advancing to the girls' doubles semifinals at a number of high-profile tournaments, such as the 2007 US Open and Wimbledon 2008. Doi also teamed with Romanian Elena Bogdan to place second in girls' doubles at the 2008 Australian Open. This flurry of successes catapulted Doi to No. 3 in Japan's under-18 tennis rankings for 2007; she had been recognized early on as one of Japan's rising stars in junior tennis.

2008 marked Doi's first participation in ITF Women's Circuit events. She partnered with Kurumi Nara again for the 2008 ITF event in Miyazaki, where they upset top-seeded sisters Erika and Yurika Sema, 3–6, 6–3, [10–6] in the second round. Doi and Nara went on to triumph over Kimiko Date-Krumm and Tomoko Yonemura in the final.

== Professional tour ==
=== 2006–09: First ITF title and qualifiers on WTA Tour ===
Doi officially turned pro in June 2006, at the age of 15. In 2009, she focused primarily on Japanese tournaments, where she earned two first-place and two second-place finishes in singles and one second-place result in doubles. In March 2009, she won her first ITF title at the $10k Kofu event. In October, she made her tour debut in the qualifiers of the Japan Women's Open, falling to American Abigail Spears in the second qualifying round. Doi was seeded sixth in the women's singles draw of the All Japan Tennis Championships. She lost in straight sets to Akiko Morigami in the round of 16. Her performance in 2009's events lifted Doi from a year-opening ranking of No. 613 to a year-end mark of No. 199 and a place among the top 10-players in Japanese tennis.

=== 2010: First major qualifying ===
In 2010, Doi began playing professional tournaments outside Japan. She appeared in the women's singles qualifiers for that year's Australian Open. Doi then made appearances at several circuit tournaments, placing second in singles at Irapuato, Mexico in March. In doubles, she recorded three second-place finishes in as many weeks in April tournaments at Incheon, Gimhae, and Changwon, South Korea, with partner Junri Namigata. With new partner Kotomi Takahata, Doi won her first $50k title in doubles at the Fukuoka International in May, defeating Marina Erakovic and Alexandra Panova in straight sets.

Her success continued in the qualifying rounds of the French Open, where she defeated Mandy Minella and upset Michelle Larcher de Brito to reach the qualifier finals. With her victory over Vitalia Diatchenko, Doi had earned a spot in her first major tournament main draw, where she lost to Polona Hercog in the first round. She finished the year with a first-place performance in the All Japan Tennis Championships women's singles.

=== 2011: First major main-draw win ===
Doi's results at majors improved in 2011, when she qualified for Wimbledon and had her first win in Grand Slam tournament against Bethanie Mattek-Sands. She went on to defeat Zheng Jie, before losing in the third round to Sabine Lisicki.

=== 2012: First WTA Tour quarterfinal ===
The Birmingham Classic was Doi's first appearance in the quarterfinals of a singles tour event, which she reached by defeating the top seed Francesca Schiavone in two sets. Although Doi lost in the Wimbledon qualifiers to Kristina Mladenovic, she received a lucky loser berth in the main tournament. She was defeated by her first-round opponent Arantxa Rus.

After failing to qualify for the main draws of the US Open and Pan Pacific Open, Doi found success at the Japan Women's Open, where she defeated Chanelle Scheepers in three sets to reach her first tour semifinal.

=== 2013: Main-draw appearance at all major tournaments ===
2013 marked the first year in which Doi qualified for all four Grand Slam tournaments. In the Australian Open, she reached the second round after a two-set victory over Petra Martić, before losing 0–6, 0–6 to Maria Sharapova. She lost in the first round in the other three major events. At the French Open, she faced Madison Keys, at Wimbledon Sílvia Soler Espinosa, and at the US Open Petra Kvitová.

=== 2016: Wimbledon fourth round, top 30 debut ===
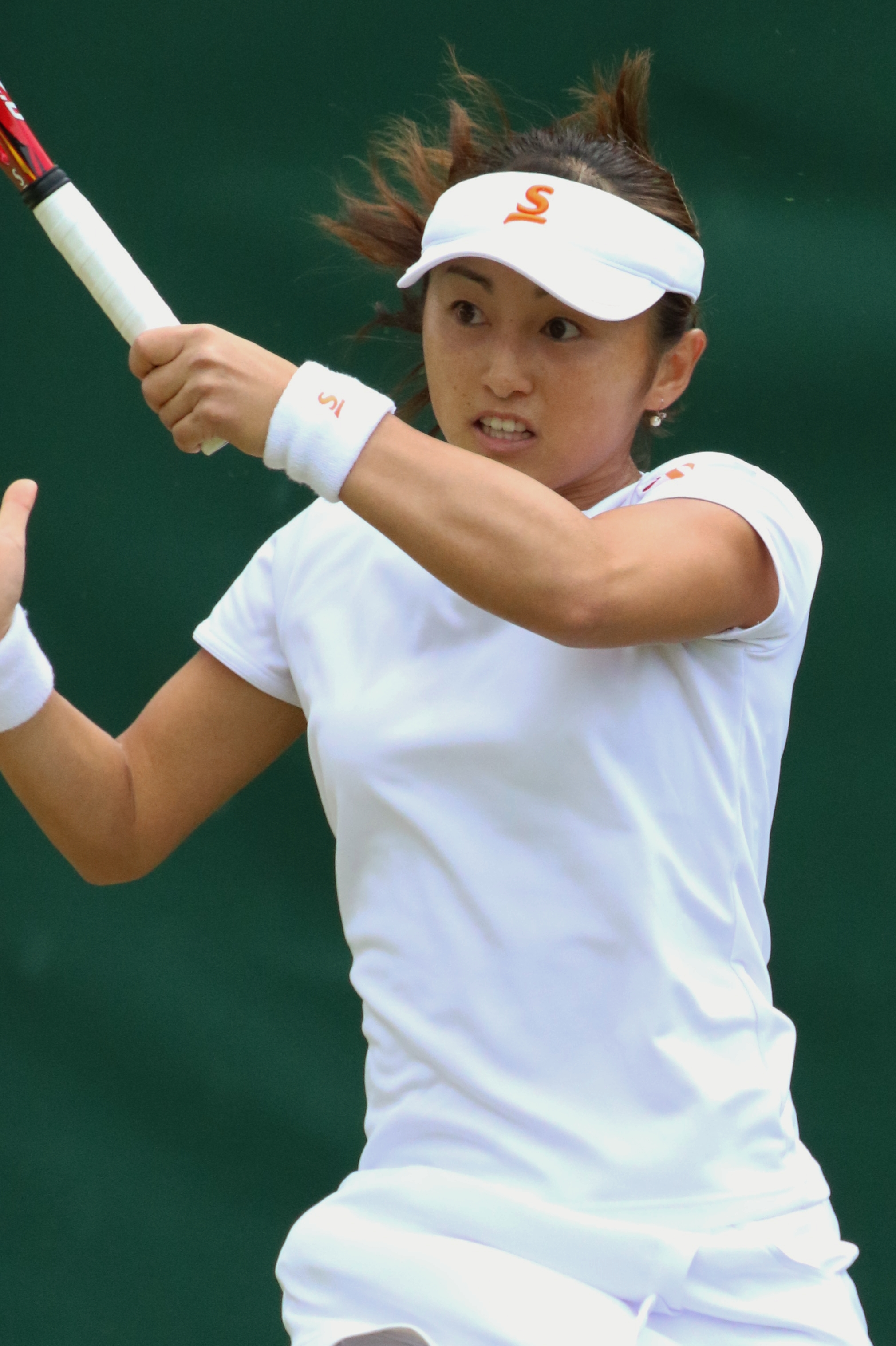
Doi at the 2016 Wimbledon Championships

At the Australian Open, Doi played the seventh seed Angelique Kerber in the first round, winning the first set and holding a match point in the second set tie-break, before eventually losing in three sets. Kerber went on to win the title. On 16 May, she achieved a new career-high ranking of world No. 38, after her quarterfinal appearance in the Italian Open.

Doi competed at the Birmingham Classic, losing to Johanna Konta. She then reached the last 16 of Wimbledon beating Louisa Chirico, Karolína Plíšková and Anna-Lena Friedsam, before losing to Kerber, in straight sets. Doi was the first Japanese player to reach the fourth round of the ladies draw since Ai Sugiyama ten years earlier.

She made her top 30 debut on 10 October 2016.

=== 2017: Inconsistency and falling out of top 100 ===
Doi had a slow start to the year in Australia, beating world No. 30, Ekaterina Makarova, in the first round of the Brisbane International, before then losing three matches in a row to Roberta Vinci, local wildcard in Hobart Lizette Cabrera, and then falling in round one to Pauline Parmentier at the Australian Open. Following a quarterfinal at the Taiwan Open - falling to Lucie Šafářová, she struggled for consistency, winning only one more match between February and May.

She had a minor resurgence on clay, beating world No. 13 and ninth seed Madison Keys and qualifier Donna Vekić at Madrid, and then reaching the semifinals at Nürnberg. She then suffered a disappointing first-round exit at the French Open to Sara Errani, before exiting at the same stage at Wimbledon to Kirsten Flipkens.

For the rest of the year, Doi was not able to win back-to-back matches in tournaments, including a first-round exit in the US Open to Barbora Strýcová. After another first-round loss in the Japan Women's Open to Zarina Diyas, she exited the top 100. She suffered further first-round losses to Irina Khromacheva in Hua Hin and world No. 79 and top seed, Aryna Sabalenka, in the $125k event in Taipei, Doi ended the year with just one more win in Hawaii, and ended the year ranked 119.

=== 2018: Return to the ITF Circuit and WTA Tour qualifying ===
Due to her ranking drop following her struggles in 2017, Doi returned to playing qualifying events in the Australian swing. She beat Tamara Zidanšek in the first round of qualifying at the Brisbane International before falling to Heather Watson in straight sets. She then exited the Australian Open to Dayana Yastremska in the first round of qualifying.

Doi then had two first-round losses in Challenger-level events in the U.S., losing to wildcard Victoria Duval, 1-6 2-6 at Newport Beach, and then to Bianca Andreescu in the $100k event in Midland.

Her ranking having dropped to 144, Doi dropped down to $25k event in Surprise, Arizona but was shocked in the second round by a French qualifier ranked 499. She then played three ITF and Challenger events, reaching a $25k quarterfinal in Rancho Santa Fe, and qualifying for the Indian Wells Challenger, before falling in a final-set tiebreaker to Varvara Lepchenko.

After failing to qualify for Charleston, Doi played a number of ITF events with very limited success, winning only two matches and losing five. She then lost in the first round of qualifying for the French Open in straight sets to Rebecca Peterson.

Her ranking having plunged to 328, she returned to Asia to play a series of $25k events. This saw an upturn in form, winning the event in Kofu against five Japanese opponents, before then reaching the final of the event in Daegu in South Korea, before retiring injured 2-5 down in the final to Han Na-lae. She then continued her improved form in the US, reaching a quarterfinal of a $60k event in Honolulu, losing to Jessica Pegula, before reaching a semifinal in Ashland, Kentucky, beating the top seed Caroline Dolehide on route, for her best ranking win of the season.

Doi then had a breakthrough in her season, by qualifying and winning a $100k event in Vancouver, beating Heather Watson in the final. This provided her ranking a boost of around 80 places and meant she could play the qualifying event of the US Open - but lost in the first round to compatriot Nao Hibino, in straight sets.

After a first-round loss as a wildcard in Hiroshima, Doi qualified for the Pan Pacific Open before falling in the first round to Camila Giorgi. After an early exit in Tashkent, Doi qualified for the Tianjin Open, and had her best ranking win of the season by beating Yulia Putintseva, ranked 47. She then lost in the second round to Timea Bacsinszky. Her next breakthrough was at the $100k event in Shenzhen, where she reached semifinals - beating third seed Luksika Kumkhum, before losing to top seed Zheng Saisai. She ended season with a first-round loss to wildcard Sabine Lisicki in the WTA 125 event in Taipei.

She ended 2018 ranked 139.

=== 2019: Back to top 100 ===
Doi played her first event of the year at the Australian Open qualifying event, and carried on the good form of the end of 2018 by winning through three qualifying rounds to the main draw, though the highest-ranked opponent she faced was world No. 248. She then lost in straight sets to Madison Brengle.

Doi then entered five tournaments, winning only one match. She lost to Christina McHale in three sets (Newport Beach), to Margarita Gasparyan in straight sets (St. Petersburg Trophy), in a third-set tiebreak to Georgina García Pérez in Japan's Fed Cup World Group II tie against Spain, in three sets to Magdalena Fręch in Dubai, and in straight sets to Donna Vekić (Mexican Open). Her sole win during this run was a three-set victory over Han Xinyun in Dubai.

Her form took a turn in Indian Wells, where she beat Francesca Di Lorenzo and Yanina Wickmayer to qualify, before defeating Ons Jabeur (WR55) in straight sets in the first round. She then took the opening set against top-5 player and fifth seed Karolína Plíšková, before falling 7-6, 1-6, 1-6. She repeated the feat in Miami, beating 71st-ranked Anastasia Potapova and Mandy Minella in qualifying, before defeating wildcard Wang Xinyu in the first round. She then lost in two tight sets to Polona Hercog. Her performances in both tournaments raised her ranking back up to just outside the top 100 once more, at 101.

Doi then hit a barren spell with six tour losses in a row (only winning two matches at Fed Cup World Group II playoffs against Netherlands), including a first-round loss at the French Open to seventh-ranked Sloane Stephens.

On grass, Doi beat Myrtille Georges in the $100k event in Manchester, before losing to Wang Xiyu. She lost in the first round of the Birmingham Classic to Viktoriya Tomova, before falling in the second round of qualifying at Wimbledon. This meant she had fallen to around 117 in the world.

Doi then suddenly turned around her poor form with a run to the title in Bastad with wins over Australian Alison Bai, seventh-seeded Kazakh Elena Rybakina, fourth seeded German Mona Barthel, eighth-seeded Serbian Aleksandra Krunić, before beating Montenegrin Danka Kovinić in the final. The title was Doi's last WTA Tour title, and pushed her back into the top 100 rankings.

After a first-round loss in San Jose, Doi qualified for the Roger's Cup but lost in the first round to qualifier Ekaterina Alexandrova. She then lost in the first round of the $100k Vancouver Open, before losing in straight sets in the US Open to tenth seed Madison Keys.

Doi continued her good form with a run to the final in Hiroshima, beating both qualifier Junri Namigata and Australian qualifier Zoe Hives in a three-setter, as well as seventh seed Sara Sorribes Tormo, and second seed Veronika Kudermetova each one in straight sets. In the final, she lost to compatriot Nao Hibino - with whom she also took her last tour-level doubles title. She then reached the quarterfinals of the Pan Pacific Open, including beating world No. 21, Donna Vekić, in the second round. With these performances, she returned to world No. 74 in the rankings.

Her final tournaments were at the China Open, where she fell in qualifying, before qualifying in Linz with three-set wins over wildcard Melanie Klaffner and world No. 116, Jasmine Paolini. She lost to top seed Kiki Bertens in the main draw. Her final tournament of the season resulted in a three-set first-round loss to second seed Julia Görges in the Luxembourg Open.

Doi's year-end ranking had improved by 65 places on the previous year, ending the year ranked 74.

=== 2020: COVID-19 pandemic and inconsistent results ===
Doi started 2020 with four straight losses, including a final set tiebreak loss in the Australian Open to qualifier Harriet Dart and a singles tie loss to Carla Suarez Navarro in the Fed Cup tie with Spain. She entered the main draw of the Qatar Ladies Open as a lucky loser, but lost for the second time to Tereza Martincová, who had beaten her in qualifying. She then reached the final of the WTA 125 event in Indian Wells, including wins over world No. 59, Bernarda Pera, former world No. 2, Vera Zvonareva, and Yanina Wickmayer, before losing to Irina-Camelia Begu in the final. This was her final event before restrictions of the COVID-19 pandemic shut down the professional tour.

In her first tournaments after the pandemic break, Doi again struggled to consistently win at Tour level. She lost in the first round of the Top Seed Open to wildcard Shelby Rogers, before losing in qualifying for the WTA 1000 event in the Western & Southern Open to Oceane Dodin. She then lost in the first round to fourth seed and eventual champion Naomi Osaka in the US Open.

After a second-round appearance in the Istanbul Cup, Doi qualified for Rome beating Martina Trevisan, before falling to 12th seed Markéta Vondroušová in the opening round. She then lost in the first round of the re-organised French Open in straight sets to 13th seed Petra Martić.

Doi returned to the ITF Circuit for the final three tournaments of the season, reaching the quarterfinals of an $80k event in Macon, the second round of an $80k event in Tyler, and then retired injured in the final set of the semifinal of a $100k event in Charleston to Mayar Sherif, having defeated Robin Montgomery, Sara Errani, and Ann Li in the previous rounds. She finished the season ranked 82.

=== 2022: Swedish Open doubles title ===
Partnering Rebecca Peterson, Doi won the doubles title at the Swedish Open

=== 2023: Last year of her career ===
In August, Doi announced that she would be retiring from the tour, due to chronic back injuries. She played her final tournaments at the Japan Women's Open in Osaka, and the Pan Pacific Open in Tokyo.

== Personal background ==
Doi was coached by Christian Zahalka since April 2015. Her most admired players are Justine Henin and Shingo Kunieda. She uses a Srixon racquet and ASICS shoes, prefers to play on hardcourts, and favors her forehand and serve.

== Performance timelines ==
Key
W	F	SF	QF	#R	RR	Q#	P#	DNQ	A	Z#	PO	G	S	B	NMS	NTI	P	NH

(W) winner; (F) finalist; (SF) semifinalist; (QF) quarterfinalist; (#R) rounds 4, 3, 2, 1; (RR) round-robin stage; (Q#) qualification round; (P#) preliminary round; (DNQ) did not qualify; (A) absent; (Z#) Davis/Fed Cup Zonal Group (with number indication) or (PO) play-off; (G) gold, (S) silver or (B) bronze Olympic/Paralympic medal; (NMS) not a Masters tournament; (NTI) not a Tier I tournament; (P) postponed; (NH) not held; (SR) strike rate (events won / competed); (W–L) win–loss record.
To avoid confusion and double counting, these charts are updated at the conclusion of a tournament or when the player's participation has ended.

Only main-draw results in WTA Tour, Grand Slam tournaments, Fed Cup/Billie Jean King Cup and Olympic Games are included in win–loss records.

=== Singles ===
Current through the 2023 Australian Open.

Tournament	2010	2011	2012	2013	2014	2015	2016	2017	2018	2019	2020	2021	2022	2023	SR	W–L	Win %
Grand Slam tournaments
Australian Open	Q1	Q2	Q1	2R	1R	Q2	1R	1R	Q1	1R	1R	1R	1R	Q2	0 / 8	1–8	11%
French Open	1R	A	A	1R	1R	2R	1R	1R	Q1	1R	1R	1R	1R	A	0 / 10	1–10	9%
Wimbledon	Q3	3R	1R	1R	2R	1R	4R	1R	A	Q2	NH	1R	1R	A	0 / 9	6–9	40%
US Open	Q2	1R	A	1R	1R	2R	1R	1R	Q1	1R	1R	2R	Q3	A	0 / 9	2–9	18%
Win–loss	0–1	2–2	0–1	1–4	1–4	2–3	3–4	0–4	0–0	0–3	0–3	1–4	0–3	0–0	0 / 36	10–36	22%
WTA 1000
Dubai / Qatar Open (Note: The first Premier 5 event of the year has switched back and forth between the Dubai Tennis Championships and the Qatar Ladies Open since 2009. Dubai was classified as a Premier 5 event from 2009 to 2011 before being succeeded by Doha for the 2012–2014 period. In 2015, Dubai regained its Premier 5 status while Doha was demoted to Premier status. The Premier 5 tournaments were reclassified as WTA 1000 tournaments in 2021.)	A	A	Q2	A	A	Q1	1R	2R	A	Q2	1R	2R	A	A	0 / 4	2–4	33%
Indian Wells Open	A	1R	Q2	Q1	Q1	Q1	1R	1R	A	2R	NH	2R	2R	A	0 / 6	3–6	33%
Miami Open	A	Q1	1R	Q1	Q1	A	1R	1R	A	2R	NH	Q1	1R	A	0 / 5	1–5	17%
Madrid Open	A	A	A	A	A	Q2	1R	3R	A	Q1	NH	1R	Q1	A	0 / 3	2–3	40%
Italian Open	A	A	A	A	A	1R	QF	1R	A	A	1R	Q1	Q1	A	0 / 4	3–4	43%
Canadian Open	A	Q1	Q2	A	A	1R	1R	Q2	A	1R	NH	A	A	A	0 / 3	0–3	0%
Cincinnati Open	A	Q1	A	A	A	Q2	3R	Q1	A	A	Q1	A	A	A	0 / 1	1–1	50%
Pan Pacific / Wuhan Open (Note: In 2014, the Pan Pacific Open was downgraded to a Premier event and replaced by the Wuhan Open. The Premier 5 tournaments were reclassified as WTA 1000 tournaments in 2021.)	Q1	1R	Q1	2R	A	A	2R	A	A	A	NH				0 / 3	2–3	40%
China Open	A	Q2	A	2R	Q1	Q1	2R	A	A	Q2	NH				0 / 2	2–2	50%
Guadalajara Open	NH												A		0 / 0	0–0	–
Career statistics
Tournaments	3	11	9	15	10	15	27	17	3	14	8	21	13		Career total: 167		
Titles	0	0	0	0	0	1	0	0	0	0	0	0	0		Career total: 1		
Finals	0	0	0	0	0	1	1	0	0	1	0	0	0		Career total: 3		
Overall win–loss	0–3	6–11	10–9	9–16	5–11	13–14	19–27	9–17	1–3	10–15	1–9	10–21	5–13		1 / 167	98–169	37%
Year-end ranking (Note: 2008: WTA ranking–613, 2009: WTA ranking–200.)	158	106	97	89	122	60	38	119	139	74	82	105	180		$3,604,337		

=== Doubles ===
Tournament	2013	2014	2015	2016	2017	...	2020	2021	2022	SR	W–L	Win%
Australian Open	1R	1R	A	1R	1R		3R	1R	A	0 / 6	2–6	25%
French Open	2R	A	A	2R	1R		2R	2R	3R	0 / 6	6–6	50%
Wimbledon	A	A	1R	2R	2R		NH	2R	A	0 / 4	3–4	43%
US Open	A	2R	A	1R	2R		A	1R	A	0 / 4	2–4	33%
Win–loss	1–2	1–2	0–1	2–4	2–4		3–2	2–4	2–1	0 / 20	13–20	39%

== WTA Tour finals ==
=== Singles: 3 (1 title, 2 runner-ups) ===
Legend WTA 500 WTA 250 (1–2)	Finals by surface Hard (1–2) Clay (0–0)

Result	W–L	Date	Tournament	Tier	Surface	Opponent	Score
Win	1–0	Oct 2015	Luxembourg Open, Luxembourg	International (Note: The WTA International tournaments were reclassified as WTA 250 tournaments in 2021.)	Hard (i)	(Germany) Mona Barthel	6–4, 6–7^{(7–9)}, 6–0
Loss	1–1	Feb 2016	Taiwan Open, Taiwan	International	Hard	(United States) Venus Williams	4–6, 2–6
Loss	1–2	Sep 2019	Japan Women's Open	International	Hard	(Japan) Nao Hibino	3–6, 2–6

=== Doubles: 3 (2 titles, 1 runner-up) ===
Legend WTA 500 WTA 250 (2–1)	Finals by surface Hard (2–1) Clay (0–0)

Result	W–L	Date	Tournament	Tier	Surface	Partner	Opponents	Score
Win	1–0	Jul 2014	İstanbul Cup, Turkey	International	Hard	(Ukraine) Elina Svitolina	(Georgia (country)) Oksana Kalashnikova (Poland) Paula Kania	6–4, 6–0
Loss	1–1	Sep 2015	Japan Women's Open, Japan	International	Hard	(Japan) Kurumi Nara	(Chinese Taipei) Chan Yung-jan (Chinese Taipei) Chan Hao-ching	1–6, 2–6
Win	2–1	Sep 2019	Japan Women's Open, Japan	International	Hard	(Japan) Nao Hibino	(United States) Christina McHale (Russia) Valeria Savinykh	3–6, 6–4, [10–4]

== WTA 125 finals ==
=== Singles: 4 (2 titles, 2 runner-ups) ===
Result	W–L	Date	Tournament	Surface	Opponent	Score
Loss	0–1	Nov 2015	Taipei Challenger, Taiwan	Carpet (i)	(Hungary) Tímea Babos	5–7, 3–6
Win	1–1	Mar 2016	San Antonio Open, United States	Hard	(Germany) Anna-Lena Friedsam	6–4, 6–4
Win	2–1	Jul 2019	Båstad Open, Sweden	Clay	(Montenegro) Danka Kovinić	6–4, 6–4
Loss	2–2	Mar 2020	Indian Wells Challenger, United States	Hard	(Romania) Irina-Camelia Begu	3–6, 3–6

=== Doubles: 5 (4 titles, 1 runner-up) ===
Result	W–L	Date	Tournament	Surface	Partner	Opponents	Score
Win	1–0	Nov 2013	Nanjing Ladies Open, China	Hard	(China) Xu Yifan	(China) Zhang Shuai (Kazakhstan) Yaroslava Shvedova	6–1, 6–4
Win	2–0	Jan 2018	Newport Beach Challenger, US	Hard	(Switzerland) Jil Teichmann	(United States) Jamie Loeb (Sweden) Rebecca Peterson	7–6^{(7–4)}, 1–6, [10–8]
Win	3–0	Jul 2019	Bastad Open, Sweden	Clay	(Russia) Natalia Vikhlyantseva	(Chile) Alexa Guarachi (Montenegro) Danka Kovinić	7–5, 6–7^{(4–7)}, [10–7]
Win	4–0	Jul 2022	Bastad Open, Sweden (2)	Clay	(Sweden) Rebecca Peterson	(Romania) Mihaela Buzărnescu (Russia) Irina Khromacheva	w/o
Loss	4–1	Oct 2022	Open de Rouen, France	Hard (i)	(Georgia (country)) Oksana Kalashnikova	(Georgia (country)) Natela Dzalamidze (Russia) Kamilla Rakhimova	2–6, 5–7

== ITF Circuit finals ==
=== Singles: 12 (7 titles, 5 runner-ups) ===
Legend
$100,000 tournaments (1–0)
$75/80,000 tournaments (2–0)
$50/60,000 tournaments (2–1)
$25,000 tournaments (0–4)
$10,000 tournaments (2–0)

Result	W–L	Date	Tournament	Tier	Surface	Opponent	Score
Win	1–0	Mar 2009	Kōfu International Open, Japan	10,000	Hard	(Japan) Erika Sema	7–5, 6–2
Win	2–0	Jul 2009	ITF Tokyo, Japan	10,000	Carpet	(Japan) Sachie Ishizu	6–1, 6–4
Loss	2–1	Sep 2009	ITF Makinohara, Japan	25,000	Carpet	(Chinese Taipei) Hsieh Su-wei	6–2, 5–7, 6–7^{(4)}
Loss	2–2	Oct 2009	ITF Tokachi, Japan	25,000	Carpet	(Japan) Tomoko Yonemura	4–6, 6–7^{(3)}
Loss	2–3	Mar 2010	ITF Irapuato, Mexico	25,000	Hard	(Australia) Monique Adamczak	6–7^{(5)}, 6–2, 2–6
Win	3–3	Nov 2010	Toyota World Challenge, Japan	75,000	Carpet (i)	(Japan) Junri Namigata	7–5, 6–2
Win	4–3	Apr 2014	ITF Seoul, South Korea	50,000	Hard	(Japan) Misa Eguchi	6–1, 7–6^{(3)}
Win	5–3	Jan 2015	ITF Hong Kong, China SAR	50,000	Hard	(China) Zhang Kailin	6–3, 6–3
Win	6–3	Aug 2018	Vancouver Open, Canada	100,000	Hard	(United Kingdom) Heather Watson	6–7^{(4)}, 6–1, 6–4
Win	7–3	Oct 2021	Tyler Pro Challenge, United States	W80	Hard	(United Kingdom) Harriet Dart	7–6^{(5)}, 6–2
Loss	7–4	Mar 2023	ITF Bengaluru, India	W25	Hard	(Japan) Misaki Matsuda	5–7, 6–4, 6–7^{(6)}
Loss	7–5	Jun 2023	ITF Ricany, Czech Republic	W60	Clay	(United States) Elvina Kalieva	6–7^{(2)}, 0–6

=== Doubles: 14 (6 titles, 8 runner-ups) ===
Legend
$100,000 tournaments (1–1)
$75/80,000 tournaments (1–3)
$50,000 tournaments (1–1)
$25,000 tournaments (3–3)

Result	W–L	Date	Tournament	Tier	Surface	Partner	Opponents	Score
Win	1–0	Jul 2008	ITF Miyazaki, Japan	25,000	Carpet	(Japan) Kurumi Nara	(Japan) Kimiko Date-Krumm (Japan) Tomoko Yonemura	4–6, 6–3, [10–7]
Loss	1–1	May 2009	Kangaroo Cup, Japan	50,000	Carpet	(Japan) Kurumi Nara	(Australia) Sophie Ferguson (Japan) Aiko Nakamura	2–6, 1–6
Loss	1–2	Apr 2010	ITF Incheon, South Korea	25,000	Hard	(Japan) Junri Namigata	(Romania) Irina-Camelia Begu (Japan) Erika Sema	0–6, 6–7^{(8)}
Loss	1–3	Apr 2010	ITF Gimhae, South Korea	25,000	Hard	(Japan) Junri Namigata	(South Korea) Chang Kyung-mi (South Korea) Lee Jin-a	6–1, 4–6, [8–10]
Loss	1–4	Apr 2010	ITF Changwon, South Korea	25,000	Hard	(Japan) Junri Namigata	(South Korea) Chang Kyung-mi (South Korea) Lee Jin-a	7–5, 3–6, [8–10]
Win	2–4	May 2010	Fukuoka International, Japan	50,000	Grass	(Japan) Kotomi Takahata	(New Zealand) Marina Erakovic (Russia) Alexandra Panova	6–4, 6–4
Loss	2–5	Jul 2013	Beijing Challenger, China	75,000	Hard	(Japan) Miki Miyamura	(China) Liu Chang (China) Zhou Yimiao	6–7^{(1)}, 4–6
Win	3–5	Nov 2013	Toyota World Challenge, Japan	75,000	Carpet (i)	(Japan) Shuko Aoyama	(Japan) Eri Hozumi (Japan) Makato Ninomiya	7–6^{(1)}, 2–6, [11–9]
Loss	3–6	May 2014	Kangaroo Cup, Japan	75,000	Hard	(Chinese Taipei) Hsieh Shu-ying	(Australia) Jarmila Gajdošová (Australia) Arina Rodionova	3–6, 3–6
Win	4–6	Feb 2018	ITF Surprise, United States	25,000	Hard	(Belgium) Yanina Wickmayer	(United States) Jacqueline Cako (United States) Caitlin Whoriskey	2–6, 6–3, [10–8]
Win	5–6	Feb 2018	ITF Kōfu, Japan	25,000	Hard	(Japan) Misa Eguchi	(Japan) Megumi Nishimoto (Japan) Kotomi Takahata	6–3, 6–7^{(2)}, [10–8]
Win	6–6	Oct 2018	Suzhou Ladies Open, China	100,000	Hard	(Japan) Nao Hibino	(Thailand) Luksika Kumkhum (Thailand) Peangtarn Plipuech	6–2, 6–3
Loss	6–7	Oct 2021	Tyler Pro Challenge, United States	W80	Hard	(Poland) Katarzyna Kawa	(Mexico) Giuliana Olmos (Mexico) Marcela Zacarías	5–7, 6–1, [5–10]
Loss	6–8	Oct 2022	ITF Les Franqueses del Vallès, Spain	W100	Hard	(Indonesia) Beatrice Gumulya	(Spain) Aliona Bolsova (Spain) Rebeka Masarova	5–7, 6–1, [3–10]

== Wins over top 10-players ==
Season	2017	Total
Wins	1	1

#	Player	Rank	Event	Surface	Rd	Score
2017
1.	(United States) Madison Keys	No. 10	Madrid Open, Spain	Clay	1R	6–4, 4–6, 6–4
