= 2015 Kentucky Bank Tennis Championships – Women's singles =

Women's singles
- 2015 Kentucky Bank Tennis Championships

Final
- Champion: (Japan) Nao Hibino
- Runner-up: (United States) Samantha Crawford
- Score: 6–2, 6–1

Events
Singles	men	women
Doubles	men	women
- Kentucky Bank Tennis Championships

Madison Brengle is the defending champion, but chose not to participate.

Nao Hibino won the title defeating Samantha Crawford in the final, 6–2, 6–1.

== Seeds ==
1. (Belgium) An-Sophie Mestach (first round, retired)
2. (Japan) Nao Hibino (champion)
3. (United States) Maria Sanchez (second round)
4. (Japan) Eri Hozumi (first round)
5. (United States) Catherine Bellis (first round)
6. (United States) Jennifer Brady (quarterfinals)
7. (Japan) Kimiko Date-Krumm (withdrew)
8. (France) Julie Coin (semifinals)

== Draw ==
Key

- Q = Qualifier
- WC = Wild card
- LL = Lucky loser
- Alt = Alternate
- ITF = ITF entry
- PR = Protected ranking
- SR = Special ranking
- SE = Special exempt
- JE = Junior exempt
- JR = Junior Accelerator Programme entrant
- CO = College Accelerator Programme entrant
- NG = Next Gen Accelerator Program entrant
- w/o = Walkover
- r = Retired
- d = Defaulted

=== Finals ===
Semifinals
8	(France) Julie Coin	6	6^{5}	2
(United States) Samantha Crawford	2	7^{7}	6
(France) Amandine Hesse	3	2
2	(Japan) Nao Hibino	6	6

Final
(United States) Samantha Crawford	2	1
2	(Japan) Nao Hibino	6	6

=== Top half ===
First round
1	(Belgium) A Mestach	7	3	1^{r}
(France) M Arcangioli	5	6	3
Q	(Thailand) Pe Plipuech	6	6
Q	(Thailand) N Lertpitaksinchai	4	4
(United States) A Muhammad	2	1
Q	(South Africa) C Simmonds	6	6
WC	(United States) D Lao	4	1
8	(France) J Coin	6	6
3	(United States) M Sanchez	6	6
(United Kingdom) N Broady	4	2
(United States) S Crawford	6	6
(Peru) B Botto	3	2
WC	(United States) J Elbaba	2	6	6
(Australia) O Rogowska	6	3	1
(Serbia) I Jorović	6	3	4
6	(United States) J Brady	1	6	6

Second round
(France) M Arcangioli	7	6
Q	(Thailand) Pe Plipuech	5	4
Q	(South Africa) C Simmonds	5	3
8	(France) J Coin	7	6
3	(United States) M Sanchez	3	4
(United States) S Crawford	6	6
WC	(United States) J Elbaba	4	2
6	(United States) J Brady	6	6

Quarterfinals
(France) M Arcangioli	2	6	3
8	(France) J Coin	6	4	6
(United States) S Crawford	5	6	6
6	(United States) J Brady	7	2	2

Semifinals
8	(France) J Coin	6	6^{5}	2
(United States) S Crawford	2	7^{7}	6

=== Bottom half ===
First round
5/WC	(United States) C Bellis	5	6^{3}
(France) S Foretz	7	7^{7}
(France) A Hesse	6	7
Q	(United States) J Loeb	4	5
(Ukraine) A Kalinina	6	1	6
(Serbia) J Jakšić	3	6	3
(United States) M Oudin	6	6
4	(Japan) E Hozumi	3	3
LL	(United States) S Chang	6	6
(United States) C Whoriskey	3	1
LL	(United States) J Cako	7^{7}	3	4
LL	(United States) Nicole Frenkel	6^{3}	6	6
(United States) J Pegula	6	6
WC	(United States) K Ahn	2	3
(United States) L Embree	6^{5}	0
2	(Japan) N Hibino	7^{7}	6

Second round
(France) S Foretz	3	4
(France) A Hesse	6	6
(Ukraine) A Kalinina	6	4	6
(United States) M Oudin	4	6	4
LL	(United States) S Chang	3	1
LL	(United States) N Frenkel	6	6
(United States) J Pegula	6^{2}	6^{2}
2	(Japan) N Hibino	7^{7}	7^{7}

Quarterfinals
(France) A Hesse	6	6
(Ukraine) A Kalinina	0	2
LL	(United States) N Frenkel	3	1
2	(Japan) N Hibino	6	6

Semifinals
(France) A Hesse	3	2
2	(Japan) N Hibino	6	6

== Resources ==
- Main Draw
- Qualifying Draw
