= 2015 Kentucky Bank Tennis Championships – Men's doubles =

Men's doubles
- 2015 Kentucky Bank Tennis Championships

Final
- Champions: (Australia) Carsten Ball (United Kingdom) Brydan Klein
- Runners-up: (South Africa) Dean O'Brien (South Africa) Ruan Roelofse
- Score: 6–4, 7–6^{(7–4)}

Events
Singles	men	women
Doubles	men	women
- Kentucky Bank Tennis Championships

Peter Polansky and Adil Shamasdin were the defending champions, but chose not to participate.

Carsten Ball and Brydan Klein won the title defeating Dean O'Brien and Ruan Roelofse in the final, 6–4, 7–6^{(7–4)}.

== Seeds ==
1. (Australia) Alex Bolt / (Australia) Alex Whittington (first round)
2. (Philippines) Ruben Gonzales / (United Kingdom) Darren Walsh (quarterfinals)
3. (South Africa) Dean O'Brien / (South Africa) Ruan Roelofse (final)
4. (Australia) Carsten Ball / (United Kingdom) Brydan Klein (champions)

== Draw ==
Key

- Q = Qualifier
- WC = Wild card
- LL = Lucky loser
- Alt = Alternate
- ITF = ITF entry
- PR = Protected ranking
- SR = Special ranking
- SE = Special exempt
- JE = Junior exempt
- JR = Junior Accelerator Programme entrant
- CO = College Accelerator Programme entrant
- NG = Next Gen Accelerator Program entrant
- w/o = Walkover
- r = Retired
- d = Defaulted

First round
1	(Australia) A Bolt (Australia) A Whittington	5	7	[7]
(Bulgaria) D Kutrovsky (India) S Myneni	7	5	[10]
(United States) S Bangoura (Canada) F Dancevic	3	6	[10]
Q	(Japan) T Niki (Japan) Y Uchiyama	6	4	[7]
4	(Australia) C Ball (United Kingdom) B Klein	2	6	[10]
WC	(United States) Beck Pennington (United States) E Quigley	6	4	[8]
(United Kingdom) L Broady (United Kingdom) J Ward	6	4	[10]
(United States) D Nguyen (United States) D Novikov	2	6	[6]
(France) E Couacaud (Australia) L Saville	6^{0}	4
(United States) M Krueger (Denmark) F Nielsen	7^{7}	6
WC	(United States) Mark Ein (France) Tom Jomby	2	4
3	(South Africa) D O'Brien (South Africa) R Roelofse	6	6
WC	(United States) Sam Barnett (United States) J Witten	0	0
(Australia) J Millman (India) R Ramanathan	6	6
(United States) B Fratangelo (Chile) N Jarry	2	3
2	(Philippines) R Gonzales (United Kingdom) D Walsh	6	6

Quarterfinals
(Bulgaria) D Kutrovsky (India) S Myneni	6	6
(United States) S Bangoura (Canada) F Dancevic	2	0
4	(Australia) C Ball (United Kingdom) B Klein	w/o
(United Kingdom) L Broady (United Kingdom) J Ward
(United States) M Krueger (Denmark) F Nielsen	3	4
3	(South Africa) D O'Brien (South Africa) R Roelofse	6	6
(Australia) J Millman (India) R Ramanathan	3	7	[10]
2	(Philippines) R Gonzales (United Kingdom) D Walsh	6	5	[5]

Semifinals
(Bulgaria) D Kutrovsky (India) S Myneni	7	4	[9]
4	(Australia) C Ball (United Kingdom) B Klein	5	6	[11]
3	(South Africa) D O'Brien (South Africa) R Roelofse	7^{7}	6
(Australia) J Millman (India) R Ramanathan	6^{3}	2

Final
4	(Australia) C Ball (United Kingdom) B Klein	6	7^{7}
3	(South Africa) D O'Brien (South Africa) R Roelofse	4	6^{4}
