= 2015 Kentucky Bank Tennis Championships – Women's doubles =

Women's doubles
- 2015 Kentucky Bank Tennis Championships

Final
- Champions: (Japan) Nao Hibino (United Kingdom) Emily Webley-Smith
- Runners-up: (Thailand) Nicha Lertpitaksinchai (Thailand) Peangtarn Plipuech
- Score: 6–2, 6–2

Events
Singles	men	women
Doubles	men	women
- Kentucky Bank Tennis Championships

Jocelyn Rae and Anna Smith were the defending champions, but lost to Nao Hibino and Emily Webley-Smith in the quarterfinals.

Hibino and Webley-Smith won the title, defeating Nicha Lertpitaksinchai and Peangtarn Plipuech in the final, 6–2, 6–2.

== Seeds ==
1. (United Kingdom) Jocelyn Rae / (United Kingdom) Anna Smith (quarterfinals)
2. (United States) Jennifer Brady / (United States) Asia Muhammad (quarterfinals; withdrew)
3. (Thailand) Nicha Lertpitaksinchai / (Thailand) Peangtarn Plipuech (final)
4. (United States) Jacqueline Cako / (United States) Keri Wong (first round)

== Draw ==
Key

- Q = Qualifier
- WC = Wild card
- LL = Lucky loser
- Alt = Alternate
- ITF = ITF entry
- PR = Protected ranking
- SR = Special ranking
- SE = Special exempt
- JE = Junior exempt
- JR = Junior Accelerator Programme entrant
- CO = College Accelerator Programme entrant
- NG = Next Gen Accelerator Program entrant
- w/o = Walkover
- r = Retired
- d = Defaulted

First round
(United Kingdom) Margot Carter (United States) Epiphany Turner	3	3
(Japan) N Hibino (United Kingdom) E Webley-Smith	6	6
4	(United States) J Cako (United States) K Wong	3	4
(United States) S Chang (South Africa) C Simmonds	6	6
(United States) Morgan Chumney (United States) Kirsten Lewis	6	6
(United States) Tory Parravi (United States) Amanda Rodgers	4	3
(United States) D Lao (United States) C Whoriskey	7	2	[9]
(Japan) Mami Adachi (Japan) E Hozumi	5	6	[11]
(United States) M Oudin (Australia) O Rogowska	4	4
3	(Thailand) N Lertpitaksinchai (Thailand) Pe Plipuech	6	6
(United States) Allison Quammen (United States) Madeline Rolph	2	0
(United States) Veronica Corning (United States) J Elbaba	6	6
(United States) L Embree (United States) J Loeb	6^{3}	3
2	(United States) J Brady (United States) A Muhammad	7^{7}	6

Quarterfinals
1	(United Kingdom) J Rae (United Kingdom) A Smith	4	6	[5]
(Japan) N Hibino (United Kingdom) E Webley-Smith	6	3	[10]
(United States) S Chang (South Africa) C Simmonds	6	3	[10]
(United States) M Chumney (United States) K Lewis	3	6	[5]
(Japan) M Adachi (Japan) E Hozumi	2	3
3	(Thailand) N Lertpitaksinchai (Thailand) Pe Plipuech	6	6
(United States) V Corning (United States) J Elbaba	w/o
2	(United States) J Brady (United States) A Muhammad

Semifinals
(Japan) N Hibino (United Kingdom) E Webley-Smith	6	6
(United States) S Chang (South Africa) C Simmonds	0	2
3	(Thailand) N Lertpitaksinchai (Thailand) Pe Plipuech	6	5	[10]
(United States) V Corning (United States) J Elbaba	3	7	[7]

Final
(Japan) N Hibino (United Kingdom) E Webley-Smith	6	6
3	(Thailand) N Lertpitaksinchai (Thailand) Pe Plipuech	2	2
