= 2015 Kentucky Bank Tennis Championships – Men's singles =

Men's singles
- 2015 Kentucky Bank Tennis Championships

Final
- Champion: (Australia) John Millman
- Runner-up: (Japan) Yasutaka Uchiyama
- Score: 6–3, 3–6, 6–4

Events
Singles	men	women
Doubles	men	women
- Kentucky Bank Tennis Championships

James Duckworth is the defending champion, but chose not to participate.

John Millman won the tournament, defeating Yasutaka Uchiyama in the final, 6–3, 3–6, 6–4.

== Seeds ==
1. (United Kingdom) James Ward (first round)
2. (Australia) John Millman (champion)
3. (Japan) Tatsuma Ito (withdrew)
4. (United States) Bjorn Fratangelo (semifinals)
5. (Japan) Yoshihito Nishioka (quarterfinals)
6. (India) Yuki Bhambri (quarterfinals)
7. (United Kingdom) Liam Broady (second round)
8. (Brazil) Guilherme Clezar (quarterfinals)

== Draw ==
Key

- Q = Qualifier
- WC = Wild card
- LL = Lucky loser
- Alt = Alternate
- ITF = ITF entry
- PR = Protected ranking
- SR = Special ranking
- SE = Special exempt
- JE = Junior exempt
- JR = Junior Accelerator Programme entrant
- CO = College Accelerator Programme entrant
- NG = Next Gen Accelerator Program entrant
- w/o = Walkover
- r = Retired
- d = Defaulted

=== Finals ===
Semifinals
LL	(Japan) Yasutaka Uchiyama	7	4	6
4	(United States) Bjorn Fratangelo	5	6	3
WC	(United States) Mitchell Krueger	3	2
2	(Australia) John Millman	6	6

Final
LL	(Japan) Yasutaka Uchiyama	3	6	4
2	(Australia) John Millman	6	3	6

=== Top half ===
First round
1	(United Kingdom) J Ward	4	4
LL	(Japan) Y Uchiyama	6	6
(United Kingdom) E Corrie	2	3
(China) Z Zhang	6	6
(Australia) L Saville	6	5	6
(United States) D Nguyen	3	7	2
(Chile) N Jarry	6^{3}	6	2
5	(Japan) Y Nishioka	7^{7}	4	6
4	(United States) B Fratangelo	6	7^{10}
SE	(United States) S Bangoura	3	6^{8}
LL	(Italy) Erik Crepaldi	6^{4}	3
(United States) D Novikov	7^{7}	6
(India) R Ramanathan	3	3
(United Kingdom) B Klein	6	6
Q	(Croatia) M Pecotić	6^{5}	1
6	(India) Y Bhambri	7^{7}	6

Second round
LL	(Japan) Y Uchiyama	6	6
(China) Z Zhang	4	2
(Australia) L Saville	2	6^{8}
5	(Japan) Y Nishioka	6	7^{10}
4	(United States) B Fratangelo	3	7^{7}	6
(United States) D Novikov	6	6^{3}	1
(United Kingdom) B Klein	3	2
6	(India) Y Bhambri	6	6

Quarterfinals
LL	(Japan) Y Uchiyama	3	6	7^{7}
5	(Japan) Y Nishioka	6	1	6^{5}
4	(United States) B Fratangelo	6	6^{3}	6
6	(India) Y Bhambri	2	7^{7}	4

Semifinals
LL	(Japan) Y Uchiyama	7	4	6
4	(United States) B Fratangelo	5	6	3

=== Bottom half ===
First round
7	(United Kingdom) L Broady	6	6
(India) S Myneni	2	1
(United States) A Sarkissian	7	3	4
WC	(Australia) O Jasika	5	6	6
Alt	(United States) R Sweeting	7^{7}	6
Q	(Australia) C Ball	6^{3}	2
WC	(United States) M Krueger	7^{7}	6
Q	(United States) A Kuznetsov	6^{3}	3
8	(Brazil) G Clezar	6^{1}	7	6
WC	(France) Tom Jomby	7^{7}	5	2
(Canada) F Dancevic	6	6
Q	(United States) N Rubin	4	0
WC	(United States) E Quigley	3	4
(France) E Couacaud	6	6
(Chinese Taipei) J Jung	4	0^{r}
2	(Australia) J Millman	6	0

Second round
7	(United Kingdom) L Broady	0	6^{6}
WC	(Australia) O Jasika	6	7^{8}
Alt	(United States) R Sweeting	1	1
WC	(United States) M Krueger	6	6
8	(Brazil) G Clezar	6	6
(Canada) F Dancevic	3	4
(France) E Couacaud	4	6	0
2	(Australia) J Millman	6	2	6

Quarterfinals
WC	(Australia) O Jasika	6	2	0
WC	(United States) M Krueger	1	6	6
8	(Brazil) G Clezar	1	1
2	(Australia) J Millman	6	6

Semifinals
WC	(United States) M Krueger	3	2
2	(Australia) J Millman	6	6

== Resources ==
- Main Draw
- Qualifying draw
