= 2015 Kentucky Bank Tennis Championships =

- Date: 27 July–2 August
- Edition: 20th (ATP); 18th (ITF)
- Category: ITF Women's Circuit
- Prize money: $50,000 (ATP) $50,000 (ITF)
- Surface: Hard
- Location: Lexington, United States

Champions

Men's singles
- (Australia) John Millman

Women's singles
- (Japan) Nao Hibino

Men's doubles
- (Australia) Carsten Ball / (United Kingdom) Brydan Klein

Women's doubles
- (Japan) Nao Hibino / (United Kingdom) Emily Webley-Smith
- Kentucky Bank Tennis Championships

The 2015 Kentucky Bank Tennis Championships was a professional tennis tournament played on outdoor hard courts. It was the twentieth (ATP) and eighteenth (ITF) edition of the tournament and part of the 2015 ATP Challenger Tour and 2015 ITF Women's Circuit, offering a total of $50,000 in prize money in both events. It took place in Lexington, United States, on 27 July–2 August 2015.

== Singles main draw entrants ==
=== Seeds ===
Country	Player	Rank^{1}	Seed
GBR	James Ward	93	1
AUS	John Millman	97	2
JPN	Tatsuma Ito	105	3
USA	Bjorn Fratangelo	125	4
JPN	Yoshihito Nishioka	145	5
IND	Yuki Bhambri	151	6
GBR	Liam Broady	159	7
BRA	Guilherme Clezar	161	8

- ^{1} Rankings are as of July 20, 2015.

=== Other entrants ===
The following players received wildcards into the singles main draw:

- (Australia) Omar Jasika
- (France) Tom Jomby
- (United States) Mitchell Krueger
- (United States) Eric Quigley

The following player received entry as a special exempt:

- (United States) Sekou Bangoura

The following players received entry as an alternate:

- (United States) Ryan Sweeting

The following players received entry from the qualifying draw:

- (Australia) Carsten Ball
- (United States) Alex Kuznetsov
- (Croatia) Matija Pecotić
- (United States) Noah Rubin

The following players received entry as lucky losers:

- (Japan) Yasutaka Uchiyama
- (Italy) Erik Crepaldi

== Women's singles main draw entrants ==
=== Seeds ===
Country	Player	Rank^{1}	Seed
BEL	An-Sophie Mestach	104	1
USA	Sachia Vickery	108	2
GBR	Johanna Konta	126	3
JPN	Nao Hibino	140	4
USA	Maria Sanchez	164	5
JPN	Eri Hozumi	165	6
USA	Catherine Bellis	167	7
USA	Jennifer Brady	176	8

- ^{1} Rankings as of 20 July 2015

=== Other entrants ===
The following players received wildcards into the singles main draw:

- (United States) Kristie Ahn
- (United States) Catherine Bellis
- (United States) Julia Elbaba
- (United States) Danielle Lao

The following players received entry from the qualifying draw:

- (Thailand) Nicha Lertpitaksinchai
- (United States) Jamie Loeb
- (Thailand) Peangtarn Plipuech
- (South Africa) Chanel Simmonds

== Champions ==
=== Men's singles ===
- (Australia) John Millman def. (Japan) Yasutaka Uchiyama, 6–3, 3–6, 6–4

=== Women's singles ===
- (Japan) Nao Hibino def. (United States) Samantha Crawford, 6–2, 6–1

=== Men's doubles ===
- (Australia) Carsten Ball / (United Kingdom) Brydan Klein def. (South Africa) Dean O'Brien / (South Africa) Ruan Roelofse, 6–4, 7–6^{(7–4)}

=== Women's doubles ===
- (Japan) Nao Hibino / (United Kingdom) Emily Webley-Smith def. (Thailand) Nicha Lertpitaksinchai / (Thailand) Peangtarn Plipuech, 6–2, 6–2
