= 2019 Japan Women's Open – Doubles =

Doubles
- 2019 Japan Women's Open

Final
- Champion: (Japan) Misaki Doi (Japan) Nao Hibino
- Runner-up: (United States) Christina McHale (Russia) Valeria Savinykh
- Score: 3–6, 6–4, [10–4]

Details
- Draw: 16
- Seeds: 4

Events
Singles	Doubles
← 2018 ·	Japan Women's Open	· 2023 →

Eri Hozumi and Zhang Shuai were the defending champions, but Zhang chose to compete in Nanchang instead. Hozumi played alongside Makoto Ninomiya, but lost in the quarterfinals to Christina McHale and Valeria Savinykh.

Misaki Doi and Nao Hibino won the title, defeating McHale and Savinykh in the final, 3–6, 6–4, [10–4].

== Seeds ==
1. (Japan) Eri Hozumi / (Japan) Makoto Ninomiya (quarterfinals)
2. (Belgium) Kirsten Flipkens / (Belgium) Alison Van Uytvanck (first round)
3. (Romania) Mihaela Buzărnescu / (Slovenia) Katarina Srebotnik (first round)
4. (Spain) Georgina García Pérez / (Spain) Sara Sorribes Tormo (first round)

== Draw ==
=== Key ===
- Q = Qualifier
- WC = Wild card
- LL = Lucky loser
- Alt = Alternate
- ITF = ITF entry
- PR = Protected ranking
- SR = Special ranking
- SE = Special exempt
- JE = Junior exempt
- JR = Junior Accelerator Programme entrant
- CO = College Accelerator Programme entrant
- NG = Next Gen Accelerator Program entrant
- w/o = Walkover
- r = Retired
- d = Defaulted

=== Draw ===
First round
1	(Japan) E Hozumi (Japan) M Ninomiya	6	6
(Georgia (country)) O Kalashnikova (Montenegro) D Kovinić	3	4
(United States) C McHale (Russia) V Savinykh	6	6
WC	(Japan) K Okamura (Japan) A Shimizu	4	3
4	(Spain) G García Pérez (Spain) S Sorribes Tormo	4	4
(Russia) A Potapova (Russia) Y Sizikova	6	6
(Japan) H Kaji (Japan) J Namigata	7	6
(Australia) P Hon (Germany) T Maria	5	2
(United States) H Carter (Japan) E Shibahara	6	6
(South Korea) J-h Choi (South Korea) N-l Han	4	2
(Japan) M Kato (Australia) S Sanders	6	6
3	(Romania) M Buzărnescu (Slovenia) K Srebotnik	4	3
(Belgium) Y Bonaventure (Belgium) G Minnen	7^{7}	6^{10}	[10]
WC	(Japan) E Hayashi (Japan) M Uchijima	6^{5}	7^{12}	[7]
(Japan) M Doi (Japan) N Hibino	3	6	[10]
2	(Belgium) K Flipkens (Belgium) A Van Uytvanck	6	4	[7]

Quarterfinals
1	(Japan) E Hozumi (Japan) M Ninomiya	5	2
(United States) C McHale (Russia) V Savinykh	7	6
(Russia) A Potapova (Russia) Y Sizikova	3	2
(Japan) H Kaji (Japan) J Namigata	6	6
(United States) H Carter (Japan) E Shibahara	5	4
(Japan) M Kato (Australia) S Sanders	7	6
(Belgium) Y Bonaventure (Belgium) G Minnen
(Japan) M Doi (Japan) N Hibino	w/o

Semifinals
(United States) C McHale (Russia) V Savinykh	6	6
(Japan) H Kaji (Japan) J Namigata	4	1
(Japan) M Kato (Australia) S Sanders	3	4
(Japan) M Doi (Japan) N Hibino	6	6

Final
(United States) C McHale (Russia) V Savinykh	6	4	[4]
(Japan) M Doi (Japan) N Hibino	3	6	[10]
