= 2023 Prague Open – Singles =

Singles
- 2023 Prague Open

Final
- Champion: (Japan) Nao Hibino
- Runner-up: (Czech Republic) Linda Nosková
- Score: 6–4, 6–1

Details
- Draw: 32
- Seeds: 8

Events
Singles	Doubles
- WTA Prague Open

Nao Hibino defeated Linda Nosková in the final, 6–4, 6–1 to win the singles tennis title at the 2023 Prague Open. She became only the fifth lucky loser in WTA Tour history to win a singles title, and the second to do so in the last month (after Maria Timofeeva in Budapest).

Marie Bouzková was the defending champion, but lost in the first round to Jaqueline Cristian.

== Seeds ==
1. (Czech Republic) Marie Bouzková (first round)
2. (China) Zhu Lin (first round)
3. (China) Zhang Shuai (first round)
4. (Czech Republic) Linda Nosková (final)
5. (Germany) Tatjana Maria (withdrew)
6. (France) Alizé Cornet (quarterfinals)
7. (China) Wang Xinyu (first round)
8. (Ukraine) Kateryna Baindl (quarterfinals)
9. (China) Wang Xiyu (second round)

== Draw ==
Key

- Q = Qualifier
- WC = Wild card
- LL = Lucky loser
- Alt = Alternate
- ITF = ITF entry
- PR = Protected ranking
- SR = Special ranking
- SE = Special exempt
- JE = Junior exempt
- JR = Junior Accelerator Programme entrant
- CO = College Accelerator Programme entrant
- NG = Next Gen Accelerator Program entrant
- w/o = Walkover
- r = Retired
- d = Defaulted

=== Finals ===
Semifinals
PR	(Romania) Jaqueline Cristian	4	7^{7}	3
LL	(Japan) Nao Hibino	6	6^{2}	6
4	(Czech Republic) Linda Nosková	6	6
Q	(Germany) Tamara Korpatsch	1	1

Final
LL	(Japan) Nao Hibino	6	6
4	(Czech Republic) Linda Nosková	4	1

=== Top half ===
First round
1	(Czech Republic) M Bouzková	4	6	4
PR	(Romania) J Cristian	6	4	6
WC	(Czech Republic) B Palicová	3	2
Q	(Colombia) E Arango	6	6
SE	(United Kingdom) H Watson	2	3
(Germany) J Niemeier	6	6
Q	(Ukraine) D Yastremska	4	6	2
8	(Ukraine) K Baindl	6	2	6
3	(China) S Zhang	2	2
(China) Y Yuan	6	6
Q	(Czech Republic) G Knutson	6	4	4
WC	(Czech Republic) T Martincová	2	6	6
LL	(Japan) N Hibino	7	3	6
(Italy) S Errani	5	6	4
Q	(Slovakia) V Hrunčáková	3	6	7^{7}
7	(China) Xin Wang	6	3	6^{5}

Second round
PR	(Romania) J Cristian	6	6
Q	(Colombia) E Arango	4	3
(Germany) J Niemeier	0^{r}
8	(Ukraine) K Baindl	5
(China) Y Yuan	6	2	2
WC	(Czech Republic) T Martincová	1	6	6
LL	(Japan) N Hibino	6	7
Q	(Slovakia) V Hrunčáková	1	5

Quarterfinals
PR	(Romania) J Cristian	6	1	6
8	(Ukraine) K Baindl	4	6	2
WC	(Czech Republic) T Martincová	1	2
LL	(Japan) N Hibino	6	6

Semifinals
PR	(Romania) J Cristian	4	7^{7}	3
LL	(Japan) N Hibino	6	6^{2}	6

=== Bottom half ===
First round
9	(China) Xiy Wang	6	6
(Denmark) C Tauson	3	2
PR	(Romania) PM Țig	2	2
(Slovakia) AK Schmiedlová	6	6
PR	(Czech Republic) B Strýcová	6	3	4
LL	(India) A Raina	3	6	6
Q	(United States) E Kalieva	1	2
4	(Czech Republic) L Nosková	6	6
6	(France) A Cornet	6	4	6
WC	(Czech Republic) L Havlíčková	2	6	2
(Italy) L Stefanini	2	3
(Estonia) K Kanepi	6	6
Q	(Germany) T Korpatsch	6	6
(Bulgaria) V Tomova	2	4
(Belgium) Y Wickmayer	1	6	6
2	(China) L Zhu	6	4	2

Second round
9	(China) Xiy Wang	6	2	6^{6}
(Slovakia) AK Schmiedlová	4	6	7^{8}
LL	(India) A Raina	6	5	1
4	(Czech Republic) L Nosková	1	7	6
6	(France) A Cornet	7^{7}	5	6
(Estonia) K Kanepi	6^{1}	7	4
Q	(Germany) T Korpatsch	4
(Belgium) Y Wickmayer	0^{r}

Quarterfinals
(Slovakia) AK Schmiedlová	0	2
4	(Czech Republic) L Nosková	6	6
6	(France) A Cornet	6^{3}	1
Q	(Germany) T Korpatsch	7^{7}	6

Semifinals
4	(Czech Republic) L Nosková	6	6
Q	(Germany) T Korpatsch	1	1

== Qualifying ==
=== Seeds ===
1. (Germany) Tamara Korpatsch (qualified)
2. (Belgium) Greet Minnen (first round)
3. (Slovakia) Viktória Hrunčáková (qualified)
4. (Japan) Nao Hibino (qualifying competition, lucky loser)
5. (Ukraine) Dayana Yastremska (qualified)
6. (United States) Elvina Kalieva (qualified)
7. (Slovakia) Rebecca Šramková (first round)
8. (Colombia) Emiliana Arango (qualified)
9. (Ukraine) Katarina Zavatska (first round)
10. (India) Ankita Raina (qualifying competition, lucky loser)
11. (Austria) Sinja Kraus (first round)
12. (France) Chloé Paquet (qualifying competition)

=== Qualifiers ===
1. (Germany) Tamara Korpatsch
2. (Czech Republic) Gabriela Knutson
3. (Slovakia) Viktória Hrunčáková
4. (Colombia) Emiliana Arango
5. (Ukraine) Dayana Yastremska
6. (United States) Elvina Kalieva

=== Lucky losers ===
1. (Japan) Nao Hibino
2. (India) Ankita Raina

=== Qualifying draw ===
==== First qualifier ====
First round
1	(Germany) Tamara Korpatsch	6	6
WC	(Czech Republic) Nikola Bartůňková	4	1
(Czech Republic) Dominika Šalková	6	6
7	(Slovakia) Rebecca Šramková	1	4

Qualifying competition
1	(Germany) Tamara Korpatsch	6	6
(Czech Republic) Dominika Šalková	3	2

==== Second qualifier ====
First round
2	(Belgium) Greet Minnen	3	3
(Czech Republic) Gabriela Knutson	6	6
(United Kingdom) Naiktha Bains	6	6
11	(Austria) Sinja Kraus	4	2

Qualifying competition
(Czech Republic) Gabriela Knutson	6	6
(United Kingdom) Naiktha Bains	3	2

==== Third qualifier ====
First round
3	(Slovakia) Viktória Hrunčáková	6	6
WC	(Czech Republic) Renata Voráčová	2	2
(United States) Jessie Aney	6^{2}	2
12	(France) Chloé Paquet	7^{7}	6

Qualifying competition
3	(Slovakia) Viktória Hrunčáková	6	6
12	(France) Chloé Paquet	2	4

==== Fourth qualifier ====
First round
4	(Japan) Nao Hibino	6	6
(Germany) Yana Morderger	3	3
(Germany) Mona Barthel	5	7^{7}	5
8	(Colombia) Emiliana Arango	7	6^{3}	7

Qualifying competition
4	(Japan) Nao Hibino	6	1	0
8	(Colombia) Emiliana Arango	3	6	6

==== Fifth qualifier ====
First round
5	(Ukraine) Dayana Yastremska	6	6
WC	(Czech Republic) Tereza Valentová	1	4
WC	(Czech Republic) Amélie Šmejkalová	3	2
10	(India) Ankita Raina	6	6

Qualifying competition
5	(Ukraine) Dayana Yastremska	6	6
10	(India) Ankita Raina	0	0

==== Sixth qualifier ====
First round
6	(United States) Elvina Kalieva	3	6	6
(Czech Republic) Anna Sisková	6	2	4
(Germany) Tayisiya Morderger	6	3	6
9	(Ukraine) Katarina Zavatska	4	6	4

Qualifying competition
6	(United States) Elvina Kalieva	6	6
(Germany) Tayisiya Morderger	2	3
