= Nao Hibino =

Japanese tennis player (born 1994)

Nao Hibino 日比野 菜緒
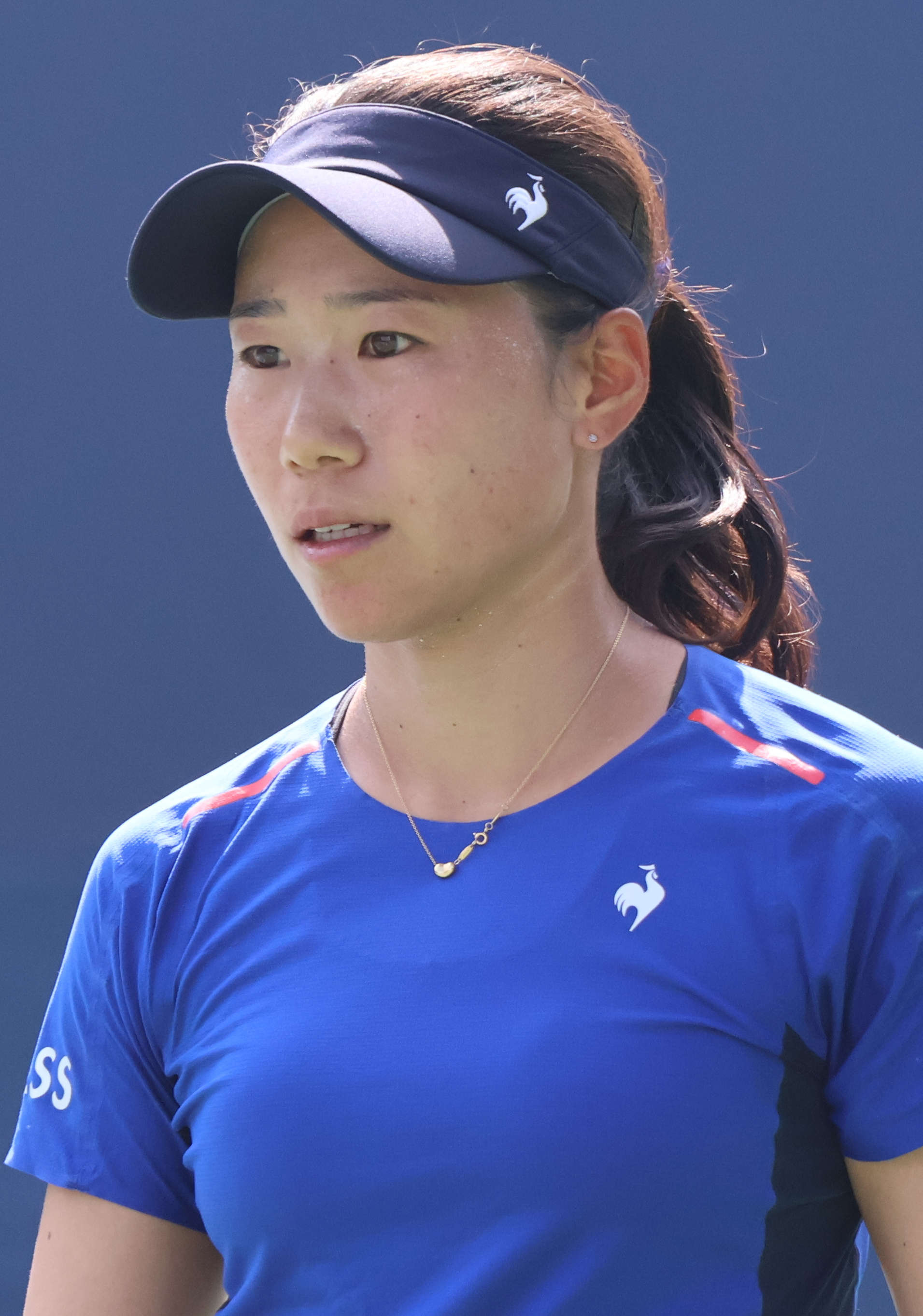
- Hibino at the 2024 Washington Open
- Country (sports): Japan
- Residence: Ichinomiya, Aichi, Japan
- Born: 28 November 1994 (age 31) Ichinomiya, Aichi
- Height: 1.63 m (5 ft 4 in)
- Plays: Right-handed (two-handed backhand)
- Coach: Eiji Takeuchi (2012-)
- Prize money: US$ 4,004,126

Singles
- Career record: 431–354
- Career titles: 3
- Highest ranking: No. 56 (18 January 2016)
- Current ranking: No. 200 (16 November 2026)

Grand Slam singles results
- Australian Open: 2R (2020, 2021)
- French Open: 2R (2020, 2021, 2025)
- Wimbledon: 2R (2021)
- US Open: 2R (2017)

Other tournaments
- Olympic Games: 2R (2016)

Doubles
- Career record: 206–194
- Career titles: 3
- Highest ranking: No. 43 (31 July 2017)

Grand Slam doubles results
- Australian Open: 3R (2019)
- French Open: 3R (2017)
- Wimbledon: 2R (2021, 2024)
- US Open: 3R (2016, 2018)

Team competitions
- Fed Cup: 9–7
- Last updated on: 16 November 2026.

Nao Hibino (日比野 菜緒, Hibino Nao; born 28 November 1994) is a Japanese professional tennis player. She has been ranked as high as world No. 56 in singles and No. 43 in doubles by the WTA. Hibino has won three singles titles and three doubles titles on the WTA Tour. She has also won ten singles and eleven doubles tournaments on the ITF Women's World Tennis Tour.

Hibino was the number-one-ranked Japanese player in the WTA rankings for five weeks starting on 11 January 2016, and reached this position again on 3 April 2023.

Hibino made her breakthrough in 2015, when she won her first WTA Tour title in singles at the Tashkent Open. As a result, she debuted in the top 100. Since then she has spent several years in the top 100, and has been in the top 150 constantly except for a period between February 2022 and September 2022 after a layoff from October 2021 to late April 2022.

She has represented Japan at national competitions, debuting in Fed Cup in 2016, and at the Summer Olympics in 2021.

== Personal life and background ==
Hibino was born on November 28, 1994, in Ichinomiya, Japan. Coming from a tennis-loving family, she is named after former top-20 player Naoko Sawamatsu, while her brother is named after Shuzo Matsuoka. She also has one older sister. At the age of 10, she and her brother were introduced to tennis by their mother.

In 2015, Hibino moved to Kobe, Japan for training. She enjoys spending time with her family because she rarely gets the chance to live with them. When she returns home, she often goes shopping with her sister and takes their dogs for a walk. She also likes reading and often reads in her spare time. Hibino enjoys eating local foods and sightseeing at famous places while travelling on tour. Since a young age, she has dreamt of playing on the Centre Court of Wimbledon.

== Juniors ==
Hibino reached a career-high ranking of No. 54 as a junior. She began playing on the ITF Junior Circuit in January 2009 at the age of 14. The following March, she made her debut at the Grade 1 Japan Open in Nagoya, reaching the second round in both the singles and doubles events. Three weeks later, she won her first junior singles title at the Grade-4 Gallipoli Youth Tennis Cup in Queensland after defeating Ashleigh Barty in the final. There she also won her first doubles title. In October, she played her strongest tournament to date, the Grade A Osaka Mayor's Cup, where she advanced to the second round. She had a better result in doubles, reaching the quarterfinal alongside Mana Ayukawa.

After starting the 2011 season with an early loss at the Grade-1 Loy Yang Traralgon International in Traralgon, she made her major debut at the Australian Open. In singles, she reached the second round, while in doubles she lost in the first round alongside Emily Fanning. At her next tournament, the Grade-1 Chang LTAT ITF Junior Championships in Nonthaburi, Hibino achieved her most significant result to date in singles, getting to the semifinals. Two weeks later, she had her biggest result in doubles as well, winning her first Grade-1 title at the Mitsubishi-Lancer International Championships in Manila. In her two following tournaments, she won two Grade-4 events in Australia in both the singles and doubles, including the one in Queensland where she defended her titles. Her singles performance then started to decline, as she lost in the early rounds at tournaments such as the French Open, Wimbledon, the Canadian Open, the US Open, the Osaka Mayor's Cup, and the Japan Open. However, her doubles performance continued to lead to good results as she reached the semifinals of the Canadian Open and Osaka Mayor's Cup. She closed out the season with a singles quarterfinal and a doubles title at the Grade-B1 Seogwipo Asian/Oceania Closed International Championships in Jeju-do.

The 2012 season was the final junior season for Hibino. She played once again at the Australian Open but again had little success with only a second round appearance in singles and a first-round appearance in doubles. Her last tournament was the Grade-1 Mitsubishi-Lancer International Juniors Championships in Manila, where she reached the semifinal in singles and quarterfinal in doubles. As a junior, she won four singles and five doubles titles in total on the ITF Junior Circuit.

== Professional ==
=== 2012–14: Successful start on the ITF Circuit, WTA Tour debut ===
Hibino began playing on the ITF Women's Circuit in May 2012 at the age of 17. She played in the qualifying draw of the $25k tournament in Karuizawa in the singles event but failed to reach the main draw. Nonetheless, she made her debut in the doubles event. A month later, she was given a wildcard for the singles main draw of the 10k tournament in Tokyo. She took advantage of the wildcard and won the title in her debut appearance. The following week, she continued with success, winning another 10k title, this time in Mie. This performance put her on the WTA rankings for the first time, getting to No. 974 in singles. In September of the same year, she won her first ITF doubles title in Kyoto along with the title in singles as well. A week later, she debuted in the doubles rankings as well, getting to No. 1066.

After not having such impressive results during the first four months of 2013, she reached her first bigger ITF final at the 50k Kangaroo Cup in Gifu, in the doubles event. Three weeks later, she won her first doubles title of the season at the 25k event in Goyang. Her results improved in singles during the second half of the year. In early September, she won the 25k tournament in Tsukuba defeating fellow Japanese player Erika Sema. Then, in late September, she got her first attempt at playing on the WTA Tour, after getting a wildcard for the qualifying draw of the WTA 1000 Pan Pacific Open. She faced 14th seed Ashleigh Barty but lost in straight sets. Not long after that, she got another chance for her WTA Tour debut at the Japan Women's Open in Tokyo. She made it through the first round of the qualifying draw, after beating her compatriot Miki Miyamura but then was beaten by Zarina Diyas. During the year, Hibino improved her ranking. In singles, she rose from world No. 576 in the opening week to No. 291 as her year-end ranking. In doubles, she advanced from No. 1069 to No. 327.

During the season of 2014, Hibino advanced to a couple of quarterfinals and semifinals on the ITF Circuit and reached one final in both singles and doubles, at the 25k Fergana Challenger. In both events, she failed to win the trophy. However, she made some progress, making her WTA Tour main-draw debut at the Japan Women's Open in the doubles event where she partnered with Riko Sawayanagi. That year, she had her first chance for her major main-draw debut but lost in the qualifying at the US Open. She made mild progress in the singles rankings, getting to No. 204 in July, her highest ranking at the time.

=== 2015: Breakthrough and first WTA Tour title, top 100 ===
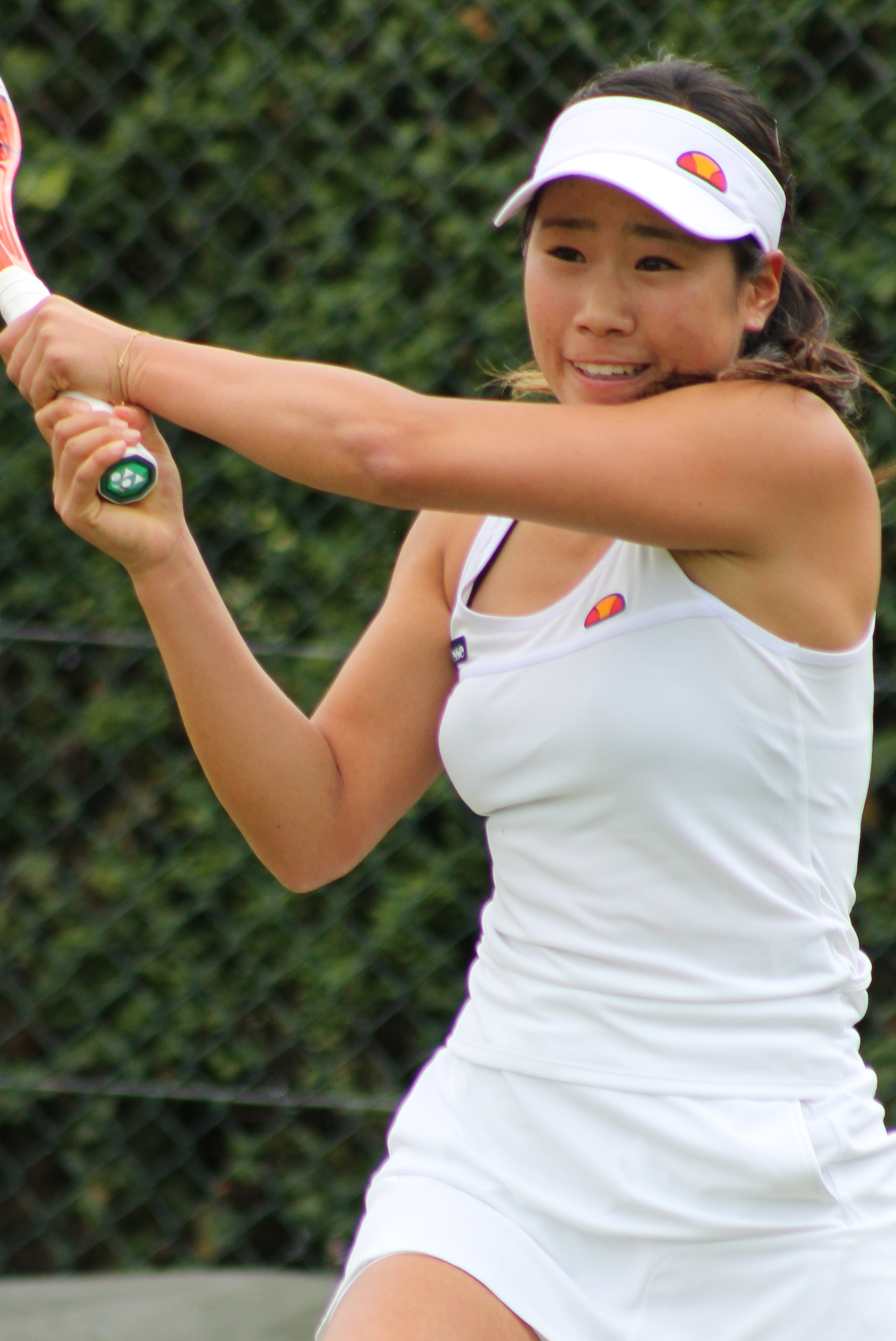
Hibino in the Wimbledon qualifying for the first time

Despite making progress in the previous seasons, Hibino was still limited to playing mainly at the ITF tournaments. However, she continued to excel there. Her first title of the year happened in early April at Bangkok in doubles. Then, the following week, she advanced to the final of the 25k Ahmedabad tournament, also in doubles. A month later, at the 50k Fukuoka International, she reached her first singles final after almost a year. She failed to win the title against Kristýna Plíšková but then the following week, she won the 50k Kurume Cup beating Eri Hozumi in the final. She then lost in Wimbledon qualifying, but followed this up with another ITF singles title at the 50k Stockton Challenger. In late July, she won both singles and doubles titles at the 50k Lexington Open.

Hibino then was really close to making her major main-draw debut, reaching the final stage of qualifying of the US Open but did not manage to qualify losing to Kateryna Bondarenko, while she won only two games. Two weeks later, she made her singles WTA Tour debut, playing at the Japan Women's Open. She entered the main draw as a wildcard player and also won her first WTA Tour match, after defeating her compatriot Hiroko Kuwata. This helped her to enter qualifying of the Premier-level Pan Pacific Open but she was stopped again by Bondarenko in the final stage of qualification. Nonetheless, the following week she made big progress, winning her first WTA singles title at the Tashkent Open. In the final, she defeated Donna Vekić. The victory helped her debut inside the top 100 of the WTA singles rankings, rising up to No. 76. By the end of the year, she advanced to the semifinal of the WTA 125 Hua Hin Championships, followed up with the final of the 100k Tokyo Open that made her move to No. 66 in the singles rankings.

=== 2016–17: Continued progress, first career doubles title ===
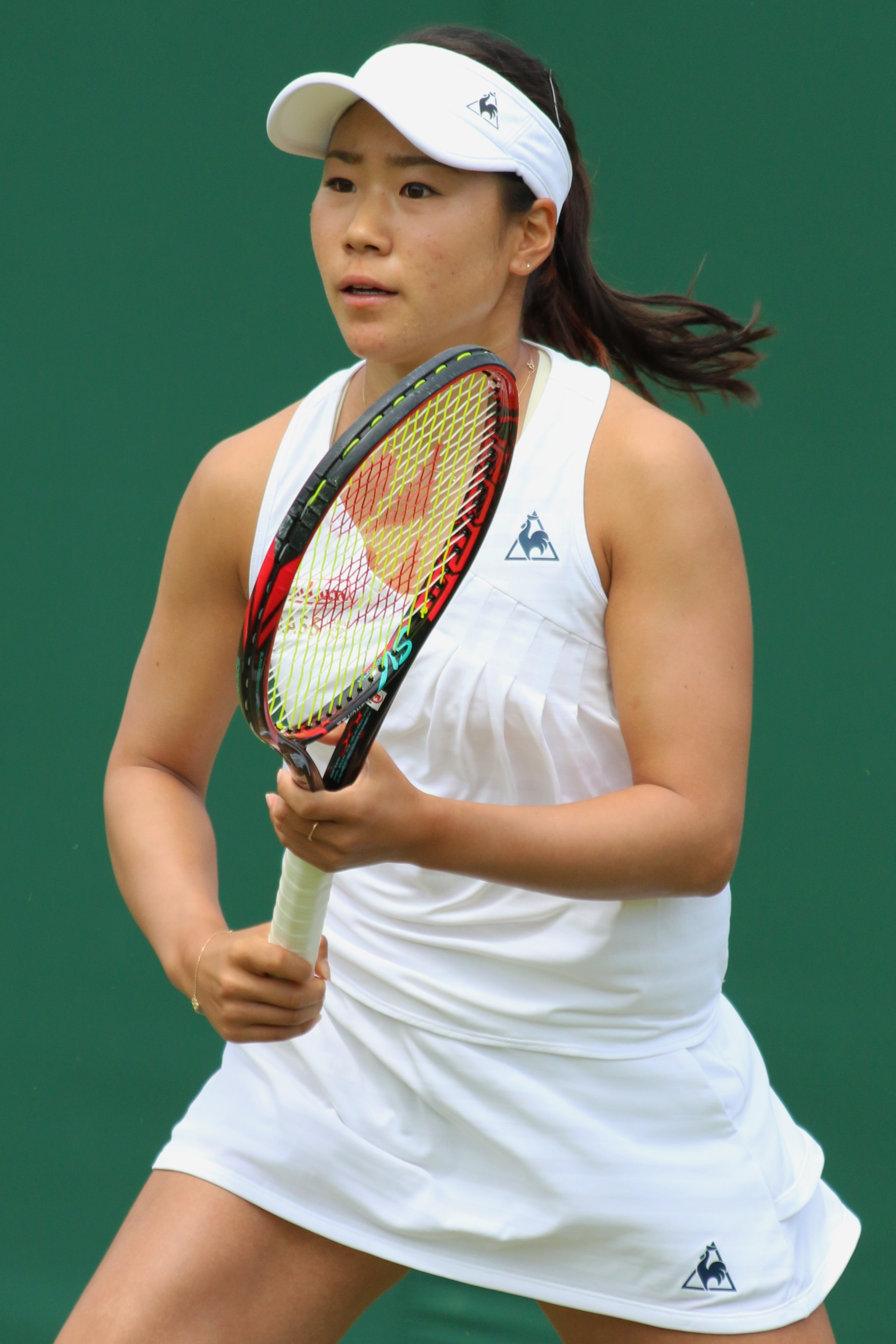
Hibino at the 2017 Wimbledon Championships

Having made it to relatively few main draws in previous years, Hibino mostly played tour-level events in 2016 as a result of being in the top 100. She began the year with a quarterfinal at the Auckland Open, after defeating two top-100 players but then lost to top-50 player Julia Görges. The following week, she advanced to the second round of the Hobart International. Right after that, she reached her highest singles ranking and did not have to play in qualifying for the Australian Open. In her major debut she lost to former world No. 1, Maria Sharapova, in the first round. Her improvement continued with her WTA 1000 debut at the Qatar Ladies Open where she defeated Yaroslava Shvedova, before losing to world No. 5, Garbiñe Muguruza. She then suffered first-round losses at the WTA 1000 Indian Wells and Miami Opens.

As a seed for the first time on a tour-level event, Hibino made it into the quarterfinals of the İstanbul Cup. She then did not perform well at either the French Open or Wimbledon, losing in the first round. However, it was her first main-draw appearance at both. In early August, she advanced to another tour quarterfinal, this time at the Brasil Tennis Cup in Florianópolis but lost to Irina-Camelia Begu. She followed this performance by playing for Japan at the Summer Olympics in Rio de Janeiro, where this time she was able to defeat Begu but then lost to Muguruza. With her debut at the US Open, she played the main draw at all four major tournaments, but again lost in the first round. She closed the season with a final at the Tashkent Open in singles and the title of the 100k Poitiers tournament in doubles. It was the first season for Hibino that she spent a whole year inside the top 100 in singles. In doubles, she debuted in the top 100 in September and spent the rest of the year there.

Hibino began the year of 2017 ranked No. 93 in the world. But she was still forced to play some qualifying draws, and she had a disappointing start. After being knocked out in the first round at the Australian Open, she lost in qualifying at several WTA 1000 tournaments, including the Dubai Championships, the Indian Wells Open, and the Miami Open. Nonetheless, she rebounded at the following tournament, getting to a final at the Malaysian Open. After defeating Maryna Zanevska in the first round, she got a walkover victory due to withdrawal of Elina Svitolina. Subsequent victories over Lesley Kerkhove and Magda Linette sent her into the final. There she faced qualifier Ashleigh Barty but lost in straight sets. She rebounded at the Monterrey Open in April, winning her first doubles title. Alongside Alicja Rosolska, she defeated Dalila Jakupović and Nadiia Kichenok in the final. Her losing in qualifying at WTA 1000 tournaments continued in Madrid and Rome. After first-round losses at the French Open and Wimbledon, she managed to win three matches in a row in singles for the first time since March. She did so at the Jiangxi Open in Nanchang but lost to Peng Shuai in the final. At the US Open, she recorded her first major singles win defeating CiCi Bellis in a three-set match in the first round. Later, at the Tashkent Open, she reached the final in doubles but failed to win the title. In May, she debuted in the top 50 in doubles and later rose to No. 43 in July, her highest doubles ranking. That year she was outside the top 100 in singles for only four weeks.

=== 2018–20: Inconsistency, first top-10 win ===
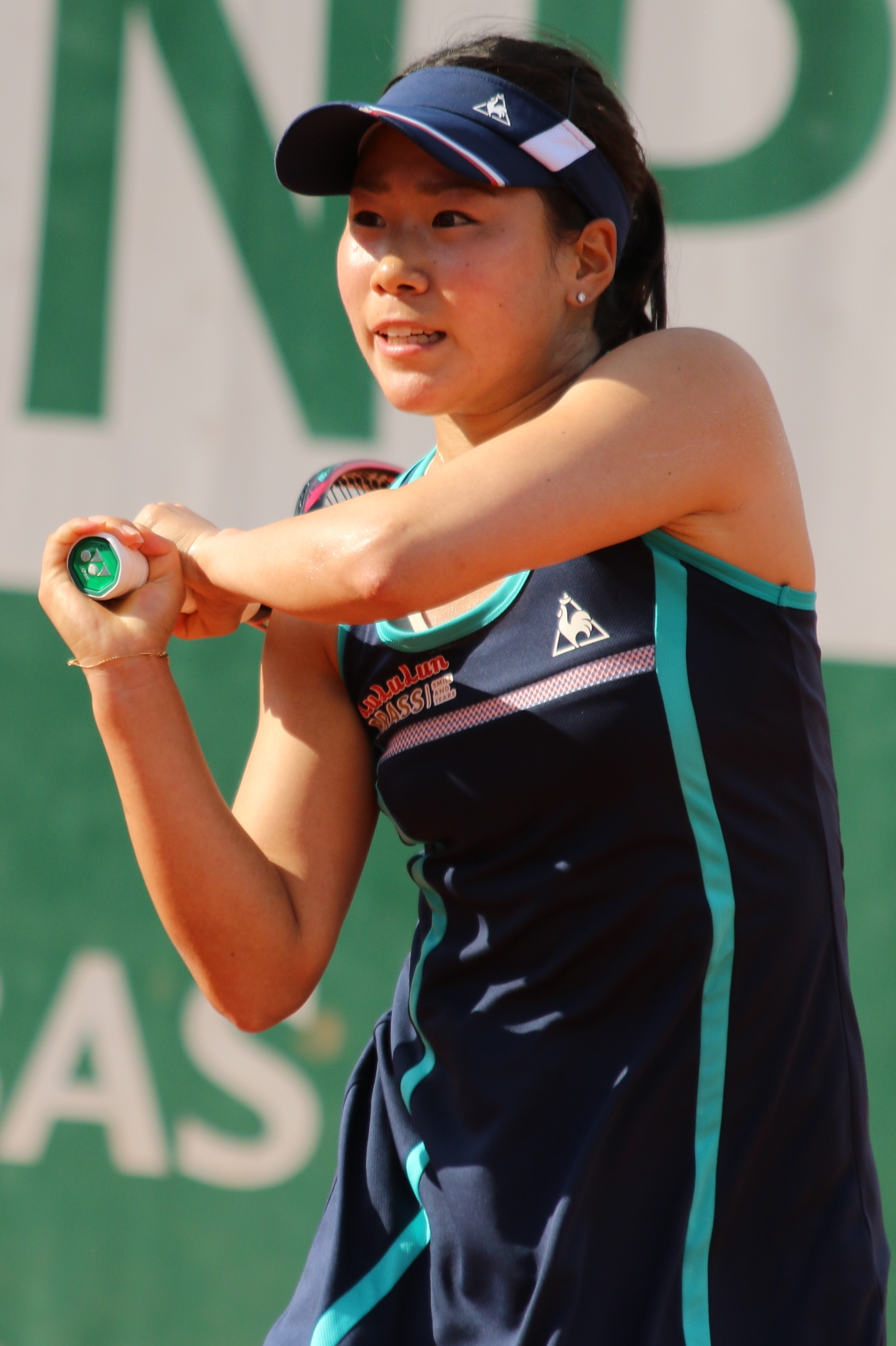
Hibino at the 2018 French Open

Despite good progress in previous years, Hibino started to struggle with results. This was particularly reflected in results in singles. She fell outside the top 100 in late February and did not return for the rest of the year. In doubles, she fared better, reaching the final of the Taiwan Open in February. With a lower singles ranking, she dropped back to the ITF Circuit. Her first final came in July at the 60k Honolulu Championships in the singles event. She later won first doubles title of the year at the 100k Suzhou Ladies Open in October. In the meantime, she lost in the first round at the Australian Open and did not get past qualifying at the French Open or US Open.

The following year, she continued to struggle with results for the next nine months. She lost in qualifying at all four Grand Slam tournaments and did not do well either in WTA 1000 tournaments such as the Indian Wells Open, the Miami Open, or the Canadian Open. Despite not reaching any at least a quarterfinal in any tour-level events since the beginning of the season, Hibino then made significant progress at the Japan Women's Open. She won titles in both singles and doubles. To get the title in singles, she needed to defeat four out of five better-ranked players than her, including two top 100 players: Zarina Diyas and top seed Hsieh Su-wei. Winning in straight sets over Misaki Doi, Hibino won the title. That was the first all-Japanese WTA Tour final in 22 years. In doubles, she partnered with Doi and they defeated Christina McHale and Valeria Savinykh in the final. That was the first time that she won both events of the same tour tournament. With these results, she returned to the top 100. In her next three tournaments, she produced more great results in doubles. First, at the Premier-level Pan Pacific Open, she advanced to the semifinal, followed up by a final at the Tianjin Open. A month later, she won the title at the 100k Shenzhen Open.

After losing in qualifying at the Auckland Open in the opening week of 2020, Hibino then reached the main draw of the Australian Open, after three wins in qualifying. In the opening main-draw round, she defeated Peng Shuai in a three-set match. The victory over Peng was her second major singles match win. This brought her back to the top 100. Next, she advanced to the semifinal of the Hua Hin Championships, after recording her first top-10 win over Svitolina. However, she could not build on this success in the following round, losing to qualifier Leonie Küng. After tennis resumed in August due to COVID-19, she suffered three consecutive losses at the Cincinnati Open, US Open, and Italian Open. However, she made it her second semifinal of the year at the Internationaux de Strasbourg. On her road to the semifinal, she defeated three top-100 players, including two former Grand Slam champions: Sloane Stephens and Jeļena Ostapenko. She then lost to Elena Rybakina to miss the final. Hibino closed out the year with her first win at the French Open, a victory over qualifier Marta Kostyuk in the first round. Ons Jabeur knocked her out in the following round.

=== 2021–22: Olympics debut, first tour final in two years ===
Hibino started year with a match win over wildcard player Astra Sharma at the Australian Open. She then failed in reaching her first third round there, losing to Kristina Mladenovic in straight sets. She then had five consecutive first-round losses, including one at the WTA 1000 Miami Open. Despite that, she advanced to her first quarterfinal of the 2021 season at the green clay event, the Charleston Open. In the quarterfinal, she lost to later finalist Ons Jabeur. She then continued with mostly first-round losses but managed to win one match at each of the French Open and Wimbledon. Her next step was playing at the 2020 Tokyo Olympics in her home country, Japan. She lost in the opening round to Serbian player Nina Stojanović. During the year, she had success in reaching one final in the doubles event at the İstanbul Cup. Together with her compatriot Makoto Ninomiya, she lost to the Russian–Belgian combination of Veronika Kudermetova and Elise Mertens, in straight sets. This final was the first for Hibino since the end of 2019. At the Olympics, she also played in doubles alongside Ninomiya but they lost in the first round to the Australian team of Ashleigh Barty and Storm Sanders.

Ranked No. 251 at the 2022 Prague Open, Hibino entered the main draw as a lucky loser and stunned defending champion and second seed Barbora Krejčíková to reach the quarterfinals.

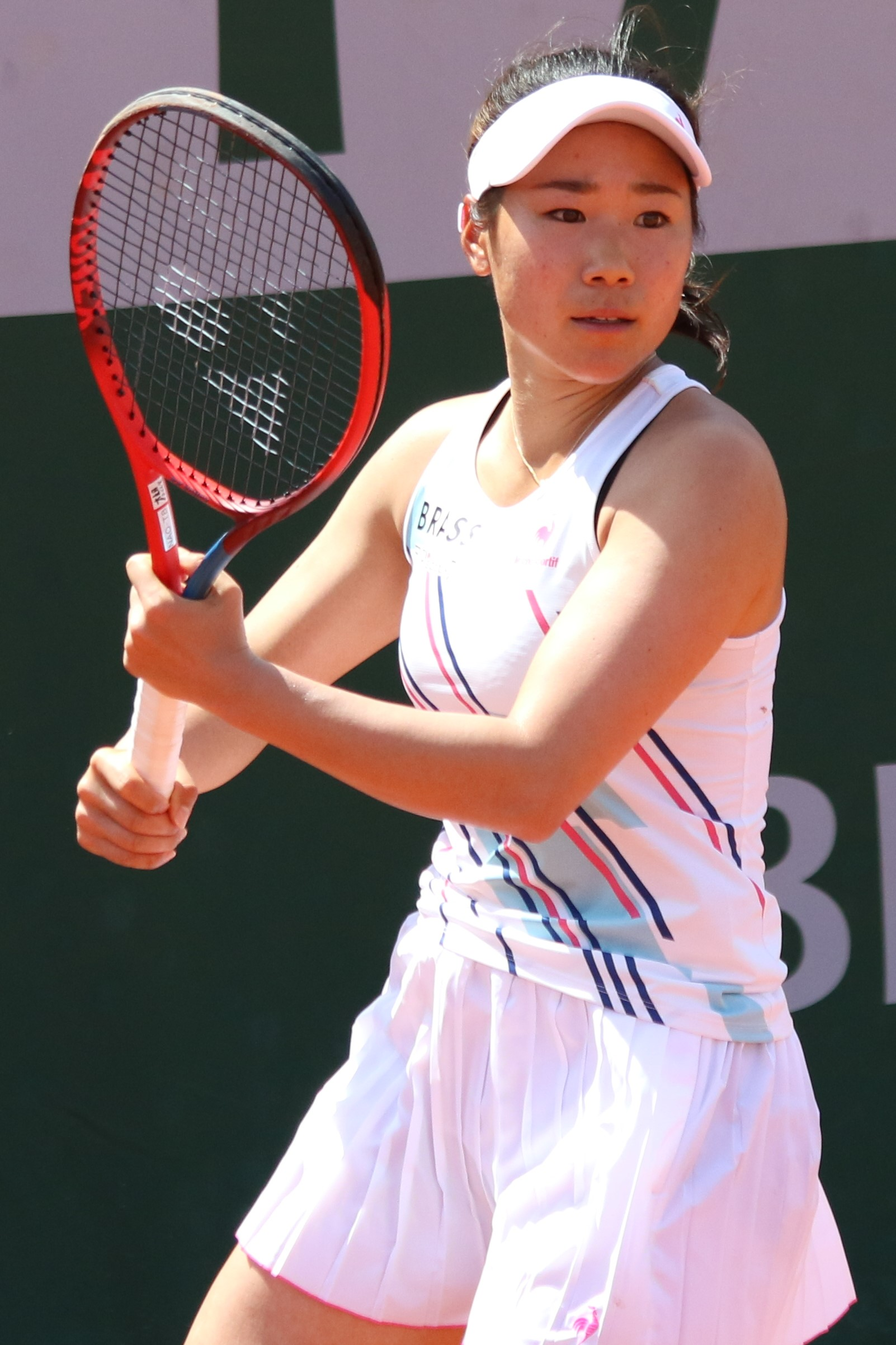
Hibino at the 2022 French Open

=== 2023: Prague Open singles and doubles titles ===
Gaining entry as a lucky loser, Hibino won her third career title at the Prague Open, defeating fourth seed Linda Nosková in the final. Partnering Oksana Kalashnikova, she also won the doubles title at the same tournament with a win over Quinn Gleason and Elixane Lechemia in the championship match.

She defeated top seed Beatriz Haddad Maia at the Jiangxi Open in Nanchang, China, and reached the quarterfinals by winning her next match against Kimberly Birrell. Hibino lost in the last eight to Diana Shnaider.

=== 2024–25: First French Open win in four years, out of top 200 ===
At Indian Wells, Hibino qualified and recorded her first win at this tournament defeating Venus Williams in three sets, before losing to 17th seed Veronika Kudermetova in the second round.

She qualified for the main draw of the 2024 US Open after three years of absence at this major event, losing to Caroline Wozniacki in the first round.

In October, alongside Makoto Ninomiya, Hibino was a runner-up at the Hong Kong 125 Open, losing in the doubles final to Monica Niculescu and Elena-Gabriela Ruse.

At the 2025 French Open, she qualified for the main draw and defeated compatriot Moyuka Uchijima, recording her first major match win in close to four years.

== National representation ==
Hibino has played at the Fed Cup for Japan since 2016. She has played in ten ties, compiling an overall record of 6–5, playing only in singles. Her debut was when Japan was in Zone Group I along with India, Thailand, and Uzbekistan. Against all three teams, Hibino played one match but lost all of them. Her first match was against Nigina Abduraimova from Uzbekistan where she won the first set but was not able to finish the match in her favor. The following day, her team played against India. Given that her compatriot Eri Hozumi won the first match, a win from her would secure a team win over India. However, Hibino lost to Ankita Raina. Since her team lost to Uzbekistan and won over India, they faced Thailand to be promoted to the play-offs. Hibino had a disappointing start to her match against Luksika Kumkhum, losing the first set 6–0 but then managed to make a comeback. For the place in the World Group II play-offs the next year, Japan faced Chinese Taipei. Hibino won the first set against Hsieh Su-wei but then lost the next two sets.

After one year of absence, she participated again at the Fed Cup. In Zone Group I, Hibino won all of her three matches. She started with a set loss against Thailand's Kumkhum but then won the following two. The same scenario then happened in the next match against South Korea's Han Na-Lae. The third one was against Hsu Chieh-yu from Chinese Taipei, which she won in straight sets. Japan then played against Kazakhstan for their spot in the World Group II play-offs. Even though they won, Hibino lost her match against Yulia Putintseva. The following year, Japan faced Spain in World Group II. Hibino played in the opening match against Sara Sorribes Tormo and won in straight sets. Following a win and loss for Japan, Hibino had her chance to secure her team a spot in the World Group play-offs. However, she lost to Georgina García Pérez in three sets. Japan's situation improved in the play-offs against the Netherlands, when Hibino defeated Bibiane Schoofs, letting her win only three games to help Japan win the tie.

== Playing style ==
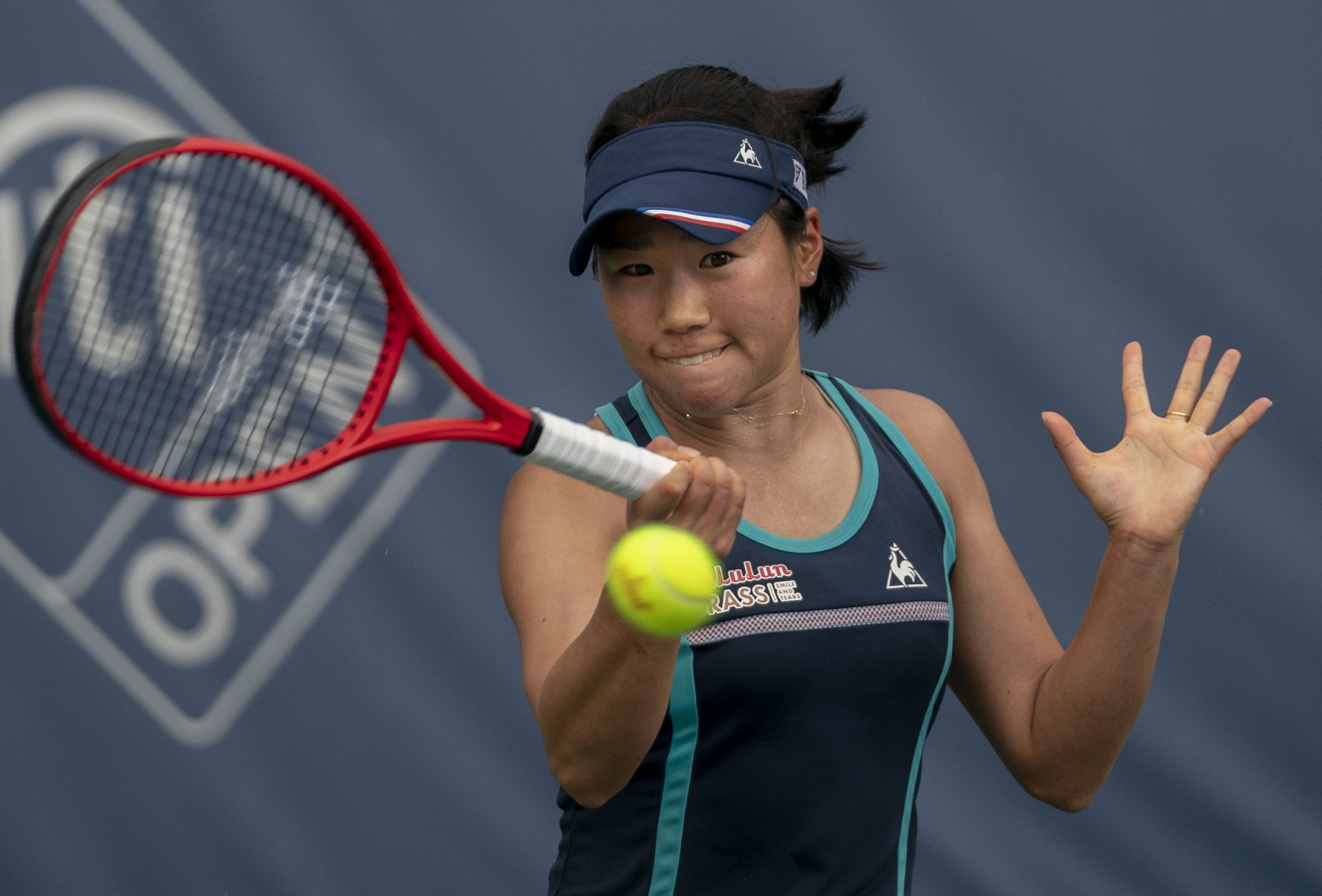
Hibino hitting the forehand.

Hibino prefers an aggressive style of play. After defeating Hsieh Su-wei in the quarterfinal at the 2019 Japan Women's Open, she described the match as 70 percent defense and 30 percent offense but stated that she has to be more aggressive. After defeating compatriot Misaki Doi in the final of the same tournament, Doi stated: "She has strong backhand but she was also using her forehand to structure points well giving me very little chance to play my game." Hibino can also be effective at the net to fend off a powerful strike from the player and secure a volley winner. One of the signatures of her style of play is the use of drop shots. She prefers hardcourts, but her favorite tournament is Wimbledon that is played on grass.

== Apparel and equipment ==
Hibino has been sponsored by Le Coq Sportif for clothing. She uses a Yonex VCore 100 racket.

== Performance timelines ==
Key
W	F	SF	QF	#R	RR	Q#	P#	DNQ	A	Z#	PO	G	S	B	NMS	NTI	P	NH

(W) winner; (F) finalist; (SF) semifinalist; (QF) quarterfinalist; (#R) rounds 4, 3, 2, 1; (RR) round-robin stage; (Q#) qualification round; (P#) preliminary round; (DNQ) did not qualify; (A) absent; (Z#) Davis/Fed Cup Zonal Group (with number indication) or (PO) play-off; (G) gold, (S) silver or (B) bronze Olympic/Paralympic medal; (NMS) not a Masters tournament; (NTI) not a Tier I tournament; (P) postponed; (NH) not held; (SR) strike rate (events won / competed); (W–L) win–loss record.
To avoid confusion and double counting, these charts are updated at the conclusion of a tournament or when the player's participation has ended.

Only main-draw results in WTA Tour, Grand Slam tournaments, Fed Cup/Billie Jean King Cup, and Olympic Games are included in win–loss records.

=== Singles ===
Current through the 2026 season

Tournament	2014	2015	2016	2017	2018	2019	2020	2021	2022	2023	2024	2025	2026	SR	W–L	Win %
Grand Slam tournaments
Australian Open	A	A	1R	1R	1R	Q1	2R	2R	1R (Note: Hibino entered the 2022 Australian Open, the 2023 French Open, and the 2023 Wimbleon Championships, as a lucky loser from the qualifying competition.)	Q3	1R	1R	Q1	0 / 8	2–8	20%
French Open	A	A	1R	1R	Q1	Q3	2R	2R	Q3	1R	1R	2R	Q1	0 / 7	3–7	30%
Wimbledon	A	Q2	1R	1R	A	Q1	NH	2R	A	1R	1R	Q1	Q2	0 / 5	1–5	17%
US Open	Q2	Q3	1R	2R	Q2	Q2	1R	1R	Q3	Q1	1R	Q1	Q3	0 / 5	1–5	17%
Win–Loss	0–0	0–0	0–4	1–4	0–1	0–0	2–3	3–4	0–1	0–2	0–4	1–2	0–0	0 / 25	7–25	22%
National representation
Summer Olympics	NH		2R	NH				1R	NH		DNQ	NH		0 / 2	1–2	33%
Billie Jean King Cup (Note: Formerly known as Fed Cup until 2020.)	A	A	Z1	A	Z1 PO	PO	A		A	PO	QF			0 / 1	9–7	56%
WTA 1000
Dubai / Qatar Open (Note: The first Premier 5 event of the year has switched back and forth between the Dubai Tennis Championships and the Qatar Ladies Open since 2009. Dubai was classified as a Premier 5 event from 2009 to 2011 before being succeeded by Doha for the 2012–2014 period. In 2015, Dubai regained its Premier 5 status while Doha was demoted to Premier status. The Premier 5 tournaments were reclassified as WTA 1000 tournaments in 2021.)	A	A	2R	Q1	A	A	A	A	A	A	2R	Q1	A	0 / 2	2–2	50%
Indian Wells Open	A	A	1R	Q2	A	1R	NH	1R	A	Q2	2R	Q1	A	0 / 4	1–4	20%
Miami Open	A	A	1R	Q1	A	1R	NH	1R	A	2R	Q1	A	A	0 / 4	1–4	20%
Madrid Open	A	A	A	Q1	A	A	NH	Q2	A	A	1R	A	A	0 / 1	0–1	0%
Italian Open	A	A	A	Q2	A	A	Q1	Q2	A	1R	A	A	A	0 / 1	0–1	0%
Canadian Open	A	A	1R	Q1	A	Q2	NH	A	A	A	1R	Q1	A	0 / 2	0–2	0%
Cincinnati Open	A	A	Q1	A	A	A	Q1	A	A	A	A	Q1	A	0 / 0	0–0	–
Guadalajara Open	NH								1R	A	NH	A	A	0 / 1	0–1	0%
Wuhan Open	A	A	A	A	A	A	NH				A	A	A	0 / 0	0–0	–
China Open	A	A	A	A	A	A	NH			A	Q1	A	A	0 / 0	0–0	–
Career statistics
Tournaments	0	3	21	17	10	6	6	17	6	13	13			Total: 109		
Titles	0	1	0	0	0	1	0	0	0	1	0	0	0	Total: 3		
Finals	0	1	1	2	0	1	0	0	0	1	0	0	0	Total: 6		
Overall win–loss	0–0	5–2 (Note: Hibino had a walkover at the 2015 Tashkent Open, and at the 2017 Malaysian Open. These were not counted as wins.)	16–21	10–17	5–9 (Note: Hibino withdrew from the 2018 Washington Open. This is not counted as a loss.)	8–6	9–6	5–17	4–6	10–13	3–13			3 / 109	75–109	41%
Year-end ranking (Note: WTA year-end ranking for 2012: 578, for 2013: 291)	207	78	84	92	119	102	72	126	137	90	152	186		$4,004,126		

=== Doubles ===
Current through the end of 2023 season.

Tournament	2014	2015	2016	2017	2018	2019	2020	2021	2022	2023	SR	W–L	Win %
Grand Slam tournaments
Australian Open	A	A	1R	2R	1R	3R	2R	1R	2R	A	0 / 7	5–7	42%
French Open	A	A	2R	3R	2R	1R	1R	2R	A	A	0 / 6	5–6	45%
Wimbledon	A	A	1R	1R	A	1R	NH	2R	A	A	0 / 4	1–4	20%
US Open	A	A	3R	2R	3R	1R	1R	1R	A	A	0 / 6	5–6	45%
Win–Loss	0–0	0–0	3–4	4–4	3–3	2–4	1–3	2–4	1–1	0–0	0 / 23	16–23	41%
National representation
Summer Olympics	NH		A	NH				1R	NH		0 / 1	0–1	0%
WTA 1000
Dubai / Qatar Open (Note: The first Premier 5 event of the year has switched back and forth between the Dubai Tennis Championships and the Qatar Ladies Open since 2009. Dubai was classified as a Premier 5 event from 2009 to 2011 before being succeeded by Doha for the 2012–2014 period. In 2015, Dubai regained its Premier 5 status while Doha was demoted to Premier status. The Premier 5 tournaments were reclassified as WTA 1000 tournaments in 2021.)	A	A	A	1R	2R	A	A	A	A	A	0 / 2	1–2	33%
Indian Wells Open	A	A	A	A	A	A	NH	1R	A	A	0 / 1	0–1	0%
Madrid Open	A	A	A	2R	A	A	NH	2R	A	A	0 / 2	2–2	50%
Italian Open	A	A	A	2R	A	A	2R	A	A	A	0 / 2	2–2	50%
Canadian Open	A	A	2R	1R	A	A	NH	A	A	A	0 / 2	1–2	33%
Cincinnati Open	A	A	A	A	A	A	1R	A	A	A	0 / 1	0–1	0%
Career statistics
Tournaments	1	2	17	22	13	10	9	14	4	7	Total: 99		
Titles	0	0	0	1	0	1	0	0	0	1	Total: 3		
Finals	0	0	0	2	1	2	0	1	0	1	Total: 7		
Overall win–loss	0–1	1–2	10–16	25–20	13–13	11–9	4–9	7–13	2–4	6–7	3 / 99	79–94	46%
Year-end ranking	318	167	80	50	68	66	68	104	125	147			

== WTA Tour finals ==
=== Singles: 6 (3 titles, 3 runner-ups) ===
Legend WTA 250 (3–3)	Finals by surface Hard (3–3)

Result	W–L	Date	Tournament	Tier	Surface	Opponent	Score
Win	1–0	Oct 2015	Tashkent Open, Uzbekistan	International (Note: The WTA International tournaments were reclassified as WTA 250 tournaments in 2021.)	Hard	(Croatia) Donna Vekić	6–2, 6–2
Loss	1–1	Oct 2016	Tashkent Open, Uzbekistan	International	Hard	(Czech Republic) Kristýna Plíšková	3–6, 6–2, 3–6
Loss	1–2	Mar 2017	Malaysian Open, Malaysia	International	Hard	(Australia) Ashleigh Barty	3–6, 2–6
Loss	1–3	Jul 2017	Jiangxi Open, China	International	Hard	(China) Peng Shuai	3–6, 2–6
Win	2–3	Sep 2019	Japan Women's Open	International	Hard	(Japan) Misaki Doi	6–3, 6–2
Win	3–3	Aug 2023	Prague Open, Czech Republic	WTA 250	Hard	(Czech Republic) Linda Nosková	6–4, 6–1

=== Doubles: 7 (3 titles, 4 runner-ups) ===
Legend WTA 500 WTA 250 (3–4)	Finals by surface Hard (3–3) Clay (0–1)

Result	W–L	Date	Tournament	Tier	Surface	Partner	Opponents	Score
Win	1–0	Apr 2017	Monterrey Open, Mexico	International	Hard	(Poland) Alicja Rosolska	(Slovenia) Dalila Jakupovic (Ukraine) Nadiia Kichenok	6–2, 7–6^{(7–4)}
Loss	1–1	Sep 2017	Tashkent Open, Uzbekistan	International	Hard	(Georgia (country)) Oksana Kalashnikova	(Hungary) Tímea Babos (Czech Republic) Andrea Hlaváčková	5–7, 4–6
Loss	1–2	Feb 2018	Taiwan Open	International	Hard (i)	(Georgia (country)) Oksana Kalashnikova	(China) Duan Yingying (China) Wang Yafan	6–7^{(4–7)}, 6–7^{(5–7)}
Win	2–2	Sep 2019	Japan Women's Open	International	Hard	(Japan) Misaki Doi	(United States) Christina McHale (Russia) Valeria Savinykh	3–6, 6–4, [10–4]
Loss	2–3	Oct 2019	Tianjin Open, China	International	Hard	(Japan) Miyu Kato	(Japan) Shuko Aoyama (Japan) Ena Shibahara	3–6, 5–7
Loss	2–4	Apr 2021	İstanbul Cup, Turkey	WTA 250	Clay	(Japan) Makoto Ninomiya	(Russia) Veronika Kudermetova (Belgium) Elise Mertens	1–6, 1–6
Win	3–4	Aug 2023	Prague Open, Czech Republic	WTA 250	Hard	(Georgia (country)) Oksana Kalashnikova	(United States) Quinn Gleason (France) Elixane Lechemia	6–7^{(7–9)}, 7–5, [10–3]

== WTA 125 finals ==
=== Doubles: 2 (runner-ups) ===
Result	W–L	Date	Tournament	Surface	Partner	Opponents	Score
Loss	0–1	Jun 2024	Makarska International, Croatia	Clay	(Georgia (country)) Oksana Kalashnikova	Iryna Shymanovich (United States) Sabrina Santamaria	4–6, 6–3, [6–10]
Loss	0–2	Oct 2024	Hong Kong 125 Open, China SAR	Hard	(Japan) Makoto Ninomiya	(Romania) Monica Niculescu (Romania) Elena-Gabriela Ruse	3–6, 7–5, [5–10]

== ITF Circuit finals ==
=== Singles: 16 (10 titles, 6 runner-ups) ===
Legend $100,000 tournaments (1–1) $50/60,000 tournaments (4–4) $25,000 tournaments (2–1) $10,000 tournaments (3–0)	Finals by surface Hard (7–5) Grass (2–0) Carpet (1–1)

Result	W–L	Date	Tournament	Tier	Surface	Opponent	Score
Win	1–0	Jun 2012	ITF Tokyo, Japan	10,000	Hard	(Japan) Mari Tanaka	6–0, 6–2
Win	2–0	Jun 2012	ITF Mie, Japan	10,000	Grass	(Japan) Yurina Koshino	6–2, 0–6, 6–3
Win	3–0	Sep 2012	ITF Kyoto, Japan	10,000	Carpet (i)	(Japan) Yuuki Tanaka	6–4, 2–6, 6–2
Win	4–0	Sep 2013	ITF Tsukuba, Japan	25,000	Hard	(Japan) Erika Sema	6–4, 7–6^{(2)}
Loss	4–1	Jun 2014	Fergana Challenger, Uzbekistan	25,000	Hard	(Uzbekistan) Nigina Abduraimova	3–6, 4–6
Loss	4–2	May 2015	Fukuoka International, Japan	50,000	Carpet	(Czech Republic) Kristýna Plíšková	5–7, 4–6
Win	5–2	May 2015	Kurume Cup, Japan	50,000	Grass	(Japan) Eri Hozumi	6–3, 6–1
Win	6–2	Jul 2015	Stockton Challenger, United States	50,000	Hard	(Belgium) An-Sophie Mestach	6–1, 7–6^{(6)}
Win	7–2	Aug 2015	Lexington Open, United States	50,000	Hard	(United States) Samantha Crawford	6–2, 6–1
Loss	7–3	Nov 2015	Tokyo Open, Japan	100,000	Hard	(China) Zhang Shuai	4–6, 1–6
Loss	7–4	Oct 2017	Liuzhou Open, China	60,000	Hard	(China) Wang Yafan	6–3, 4–6, 3–3 ret.
Win	8–4	Jul 2018	Championships of Honolulu, US	60,000	Hard	(United States) Jessica Pegula	6–0, 6–2
Loss	8–5	Jun 2022	ITF Chiang Rai, Thailand	25,000	Hard	(China) Gao Xinyu	1–6, 6–1, 3–6
Win	9–5	Apr 2023	ITF Kashiwa, Japan	25,000	Hard	(South Korea) Jang Su-jeong	6–4, 6–3
Win	10–5	Sep 2025	Incheon Open, South Korea	100,000	Hard	(South Korea) Lee Eun-hye	7–5, 7–6^{(2)}
Loss	10–6	Feb 2026	Queensland International, Australia	60,000	Hard	(Australia) Talia Gibson	3–6, 6–7^{(7)}

=== Doubles: 17 (11 titles, 6 runner-ups) ===
Legend $100,000 tournaments (6–0) $50/60,000 tournaments (2–4) $25,000 tournaments (1–2) $10/15,000 tournaments (2–0)	Finals by surface Hard (8–5) Clay (1–1) Grass (1–0) Carpet (1–0)

Result	W–L	Date	Tournament	Tier	Surface	Partner	Opponents	Score
Win	1–0	Sep 2012	ITF Kyoto, Japan	10,000	Carpet (i)	(Japan) Emi Mutaguchi	(Japan) Miyu Kato (Japan) Misaki Mori	6–4, 6–3
Loss	1–1	May 2013	Kangaroo Cup Gifu, Japan	50,000	Hard	(Japan) Riko Sawayanagi	(Thailand) Luksika Kumkhum (Japan) Erika Sema	4–6, 3–6
Win	2–1	May 2013	ITF Goyang, South Korea	25,000	Hard	(Japan) Akiko Omae	(South Korea) Yoo Mi (South Korea) Han Na-lae	6–4, 6–4
Loss	2–2	Jun 2014	Fergana Challenger, Uzbekistan	25,000	Hard	(India) Prarthana Thombare	(Japan) Hiroko Kuwata (Japan) Mari Tanaka	1–6, 4–6
Win	3–2	Apr 2015	ITF Bangkok, Thailand	15,000	Hard	(Japan) Miyu Kato	(Japan) Miyabi Inoue (Japan) Akiko Omae	6–4, 6–2
Loss	3–3	Apr 2015	ITF Ahmedabad, India	25,000	Hard	(India) Prarthana Thombare	(Thailand) Peangtarn Plipuech (Thailand) Nungnadda Wannasuk	3–6, 6–2, [10–12]
Loss	3–4	Jul 2015	Sacramento Challenger, US	50,000	Hard	(Canada) Rosie Johanson	(United States) Ashley Weinhold (United States) Caitlin Whoriskey	4–6, 6–3, [12–14]
Win	4–4	Aug 2015	Lexington Open, US	50,000	Hard	(United Kingdom) Emily Webley-Smith	(Thailand) Nicha Lertpitaksinchai (Thailand) Peangtarn Plipuech	6–2, 6–2
Win	5–4	Oct 2016	Internationaux de Poitiers, France	100,000	Hard (i)	(Poland) Alicja Rosolska	(Romania) Alexandra Cadanțu (Germany) Nicola Geuer	6–0, 6–0
Loss	5–5	Mar 2018	Zhuhai Open, China	60,000	Hard	(Montenegro) Danka Kovinić	(Russia) Anna Blinkova (Netherlands) Lesley Kerkhove	5–7, 4–6
Win	6–5	Oct 2018	Suzhou Ladies Open, China	100,000	Hard	(Japan) Misaki Doi	(Thailand) Luksika Kumkhum (Thailand) Peangtarn Plipuech	6–2, 6–3
Win	7–5	Aug 2019	Vancouver Open, Canada	100,000	Hard	(Japan) Miyu Kato	(United Kingdom) Naomi Broady (New Zealand) Erin Routliffe	6–2, 6–2
Win	8–5	Nov 2019	Shenzhen Longhua Open, China	100,000	Hard	(Japan) Makoto Ninomiya	(Georgia (country)) Sofia Shapatava (United Kingdom) Emily Webley-Smith	6–4, 6–0
Win	9–5	May 2022	Bonita Springs Championship, US	100,000	Clay	(Hungary) Tímea Babos	(Belarus) Olga Govortsova (Poland) Katarzyna Kawa	6–4, 3–6, [10–7]
Win	10–5	Oct 2022	Templeton Pro Open, US	60,000	Hard	(United States) Sabrina Santamaria	(United States) Sophie Chang (Poland) Katarzyna Kawa	6–4, 7–6^{(4)}
Loss	10–6	Apr 2023	Charlottesville Open, US	60,000	Hard	(Hungary) Fanny Stollár	(United States) Sophie Chang (China) Yuan Yue	3–6, 3–6
Win	11–6	Jun 2023	Ilkley Trophy, UK	100,000	Grass	(Serbia) Natalija Stevanović	(Poland) Maja Chwalińska (Czech Republic) Jesika Malečková	7–6^{(10)}, 7–6^{(5)}

== Wins over top-10 players ==
Season	2020	Total
Wins	1	1

#	Player	Rank	Event	Surface	Rd	Score	NHR
2020
1.	(Ukraine) Elina Svitolina	No. 4	Hua Hin Championships, Thailand	Hard	QF	6–4, 6–2	No. 84
