= 2019 Japan Women's Open =

- Date: September 9–15
- Edition: 11th
- Category: WTA International
- Draw: 32S / 16D
- Prize money: $250,000
- Surface: Hard
- Location: Hiroshima, Japan
- Venue: Regional Park Tennis Stadium

Champions

Singles
- (Japan) Nao Hibino

Doubles
- (Japan) Misaki Doi / (Japan) Nao Hibino
- Japan Women's Open

The 2019 Hana-Cupid Japan Women's Open was a women's tennis tournament played on outdoor hard courts. It was the eleventh edition of the Japan Women's Open, and part of the WTA International tournaments of the 2019 WTA Tour. It was held at the Regional Park Tennis Stadium in Hiroshima, Japan, from September 9 through September 15, 2019. Unseeded Nao Hibino won the singles title.

== Finals ==
=== Singles ===
- (Japan) Nao Hibino defeated (Japan) Misaki Doi, 6–3, 6–2

=== Doubles ===
- (Japan) Misaki Doi / (Japan) Nao Hibino defeated (United States) Christina McHale / (Russia) Valeria Savinykh, 3–6, 6–4, [10–4]

== Point distribution ==
Event	W	F	SF	QF	Round of 16	Round of 32	Q	Q3	Q2	Q1
Singles	280	180	110	60	30	1	18	14	10	1
Doubles	280	180	110	60	1	—N/a	—N/a	—N/a	—N/a	—N/a

=== Prize money ===
Event	W	F	SF	QF	Round of 16	Round of 32^{1}	Q3	Q2	Q1
Singles	$43,000	$21,400	$11,300	$5,900	$3,310	$1,925	$1,005	$730	$530
Doubles^{2}	$12,300	$6,400	$3,435	$1,820	$960	—N/a	—N/a	—N/a	—N/a

_{^{1} Qualifiers prize money is also the Round of 32 prize money}
_{^{2} Per team}

== Singles main-draw entrants ==
=== Seeds ===
Country	Player	Rank^{1}	Seed
TPE	Hsieh Su-wei	28	1
RUS	Veronika Kudermetova	51	2
BEL	Alison Van Uytvanck	68	3
RUS	Anastasia Potapova	72	4
GER	Tatjana Maria	79	5
KAZ	Zarina Diyas	80	6
ESP	Sara Sorribes Tormo	83	7
GER	Laura Siegemund	90	8

- Rankings are as of August 26, 2019

=== Other entrants ===
The following players received wildcards into the singles main draw:

- (Japan) Kurumi Nara
- (Japan) Risa Ozaki
- (Japan) Ayano Shimizu

The following players received entry from the qualifying draw:

- (Canada) Leylah Annie Fernandez
- (Australia) Zoe Hives
- (Japan) Junri Namigata
- (Russia) Valeria Savinykh
- (Romania) Patricia Maria Țig
- (Bulgaria) Viktoriya Tomova

=== Withdrawals ===
Before the tournament

- (Australia) Daria Gavrilova → replaced by (Australia) Priscilla Hon
- (Czech Republic) Barbora Krejčíková → replaced by (Japan) Nao Hibino
- (Slovakia) Anna Karolína Schmiedlová → replaced by (Poland) Katarzyna Kawa

=== Retirements ===
During the tournament

- (Kazakhstan) Zarina Diyas (low back injury)

== Doubles main-draw entrants ==
=== Seeds ===
Country	Player	Country	Player	Rank^{1}	Seed
JPN	Eri Hozumi	JPN	Makoto Ninomiya	122	1
BEL	Kirsten Flipkens	BEL	Alison Van Uytvanck	126	2
ROU	Mihaela Buzărnescu	SLO	Katarina Srebotnik	142	3
ESP	Georgina García Pérez	ESP	Sara Sorribes Tormo	177	4

- ^{1} Rankings are as of August 26, 2019

=== Other entrants ===
The following pairs received wildcards into the doubles main draw:

- (Japan) Erina Hayashi / (Japan) Moyuka Uchijima
- (Japan) Kyōka Okamura / (Japan) Ayano Shimizu

=== Retirements ===
- (Belgium) Greet Minnen (right shoulder injury)
