= 2014 Japan Women's Open – Singles =

Singles
- 2014 Japan Women's Open

Final
- Champion: (Australia) Samantha Stosur
- Runner-up: (Kazakhstan) Zarina Diyas
- Score: 7–6^{(9–7)}, 6–3

Details
- Draw: 32
- Seeds: 8

Events
Singles	Doubles
← 2013 ·	Japan Women's Open	· 2015 →

Samantha Stosur successfully defended her title, defeating Zarina Diyas in the final, 7–6^{(9–7)}, 6–3.

== Seeds ==
1. (Australia) Samantha Stosur (champion)
2. (United States) Madison Keys (quarterfinals, retired)
3. (Ukraine) Elina Svitolina (semifinals)
4. (United States) Coco Vandeweghe (second round)
5. (Kazakhstan) Zarina Diyas (final)
6. (United Kingdom) Heather Watson (second round)
7. (United States) Christina McHale (first round)
8. (United States) Lauren Davis (quarterfinals)

== Draw ==
Key

- Q = Qualifier
- WC = Wild card
- LL = Lucky loser
- Alt = Alternate
- ITF = ITF entry
- PR = Protected ranking
- SR = Special ranking
- SE = Special exempt
- JE = Junior exempt
- JR = Junior Accelerator Programme entrant
- CO = College Accelerator Programme entrant
- NG = Next Gen Accelerator Program entrant
- w/o = Walkover
- r = Retired
- d = Defaulted

=== Finals ===
Semifinals
1	(Australia) Samantha Stosur	7^{8}	6
3	(Ukraine) Elina Svitolina	6^{6}	2
5	(Kazakhstan) Zarina Diyas	6	7
(Thailand) Luksika Kumkhum	2	5

Final
1	(Australia) Samantha Stosur	7^{9}	6
5	(Kazakhstan) Zarina Diyas	6^{7}	3

=== Top half ===
First round
1	(Australia) S Stosur	6	7
(Japan) M Eguchi	4	5
LL	(Japan) M Imanishi	4	0
(Australia) J Gajdošová	6	6
(Kazakhstan) Y Putintseva	7^{7}	6
WC	(Japan) R Ozaki	6^{3}	3
(Serbia) J Jakšić	6	4	2
6	(United Kingdom) H Watson	3	6	6
3	(Ukraine) E Svitolina	7^{7}	4	6
(United States) S Rogers	6^{2}	6	1
(Japan) E Sema	1	6	0
WC	(Japan) N Osaka	6	4	6
(Czech Republic) R Voráčová	1	3
Q	(Japan) S Aoyama	6	6
Q	(Japan) H Kuwata	6	4	6^{3}
8	(United States) L Davis	1	6	7^{7}

Second round
1	(Australia) S Stosur	7^{7}	1
(Australia) J Gajdošová	6^{4}	0^{r}
(Kazakhstan) Y Putintseva	6	7
6	(United Kingdom) H Watson	4	5
3	(Ukraine) E Svitolina	3	6	6
WC	(Japan) N Osaka	6	3	4
Q	(Japan) S Aoyama	1	1
8	(United States) L Davis	6	6

Quarterfinals
1	(Australia) S Stosur	6	6
(Kazakhstan) Y Putintseva	4	1
3	(Ukraine) E Svitolina	6	6
8	(United States) L Davis	2	4

Semifinals
1	(Australia) S Stosur	7^{8}	6
3	(Ukraine) E Svitolina	6^{6}	2

=== Bottom half ===
First round
5	(Kazakhstan) Z Diyas	7^{7}	6
Q	(Chinese Taipei) Y-j Chan	6^{3}	1
PR	(Germany) T Maria	2	1
(Spain) L Arruabarrena	6	6
(China) J Zheng	6	5	2
(Croatia) A Konjuh	4	7	6
WC	(France) K Mladenovic	2	3
4	(United States) C Vandeweghe	6	6
7	(United States) C McHale	6	1	3
(Thailand) L Kumkhum	4	6	6
(United States) B Mattek-Sands	6^{4}	6	1
(Japan) E Hozumi	7^{7}	3	6
(Japan) M Doi	6^{4}	6	6
Q	(Romania) A Bogdan	7^{7}	2	2
(United States) S Vickery	3	3
2	(United States) M Keys	6	6

Second round
5	(Kazakhstan) Z Diyas	6	6
(Spain) L Arruabarrena	0	1
(Croatia) A Konjuh	6	3	6
4	(United States) C Vandeweghe	2	6	3
(Thailand) L Kumkhum	2	6	6
(Japan) E Hozumi	6	4	4
(Japan) M Doi	0	4
2	(United States) M Keys	6	6

Quarterfinals
5	(Kazakhstan) Z Diyas	6^{4}	6	6
(Croatia) A Konjuh	7^{7}	4	2
(Thailand) L Kumkhum	6	4
2	(United States) M Keys	2	3^{r}

Semifinals
5	(Kazakhstan) Z Diyas	6	7
(Thailand) L Kumkhum	2	5

== Qualifying ==
=== Seeds ===
1. (Japan) Hiroko Kuwata (qualified)
2. (France) Alizé Lim (second round)
3. (Netherlands) Indy de Vroome (second round)
4. (Australia) Arina Rodionova (second round)
5. (Japan) Miharu Imanishi (qualifying competition, lucky loser)
6. (Japan) Nao Hibino (second round)
7. (Ukraine) Olga Savchuk (qualifying competition)
8. (Chinese Taipei) Chan Yung-jan (qualified)

=== Qualifiers ===
1. (Japan) Hiroko Kuwata
2. (Chinese Taipei) Chan Yung-jan
3. (Romania) Ana Bogdan
4. (Japan) Shuko Aoyama

=== Lucky loser ===
1. (Japan) Miharu Imanishi

=== Draw ===
==== First qualifier ====
First round
1	(Japan) Hiroko Kuwata	3	6	7^{7}
(Japan) Mari Tanaka	6	1	6^{4}
(Japan) Makoto Ninomiya	6	6^{5}	4
(Japan) Riko Sawayanagi	3	7^{7}	6
(Japan) Kanae Hisami	6	7
(Japan) Chiaki Okadaue	4	5
(Japan) Yurika Sema	2	7^{7}	2
5	(Japan) Miharu Imanishi	6	6^{5}	6

Second round
1	(Japan) Hiroko Kuwata	2	6	6
(Japan) Riko Sawayanagi	6	1	1
(Japan) Kanae Hisami	3	7^{10}	1
5	(Japan) Miharu Imanishi	6	6^{8}	6

Qualifying competition
1	(Japan) Hiroko Kuwata	6	7
5	(Japan) Miharu Imanishi	4	5

==== Second qualifier ====
First round
2	(France) Alizé Lim	6	6
WC	(Japan) Chihiro Takayama	3	1
(Japan) Junri Namigata	6	7^{7}
(Thailand) Noppawan Lertcheewakarn	3	6^{5}
WC	(Japan) Maria Mukai	4	3
WC	(Japan) Chihiro Muramatsu	6	6
(Japan) Haruka Kaji	3	1
8	(Chinese Taipei) Chan Yung-jan	6	6

Second round
2	(France) Alizé Lim	1	1
(Japan) Junri Namigata	6	6
WC	(Japan) Chihiro Muramatsu	0	1
8	(Chinese Taipei) Chan Yung-jan	6	6

Qualifying competition
(Japan) Junri Namigata	2	6	2
8	(Chinese Taipei) Chan Yung-jan	6	4	6

==== Third qualifier ====
First round
3	(Netherlands) Indy de Vroome	7^{7}	7^{7}
(Japan) Kotomi Takahata	6^{4}	6^{3}
(United States) Tori Kinard	6	6
WC	(Japan) Kimika Sakata	1	0
(Romania) Ana Bogdan	6	6
(Japan) Yumi Miyazaki	0	2
(Japan) Yuka Higuchi	5	0
6	(Japan) Nao Hibino	7	6

Second round
3	(Netherlands) Indy de Vroome	4	6	5
(United States) Tori Kinard	6	1	7
(Romania) Ana Bogdan	6	2	6
6	(Japan) Nao Hibino	2	6	1

Qualifying competition
(United States) Tori Kinard	6	4	4
(Romania) Ana Bogdan	1	6	6

==== Fourth qualifier ====
First round
4	(Australia) Arina Rodionova	4	6	6
(Chinese Taipei) Chang Kai-chen	6	3	4
(Japan) Mari Osaka	6	2	3
(Japan) Shuko Aoyama	3	6	6
(Japan) Miki Miyamura	6	6
(Japan) Michika Ozeki	1	1
(Japan) Kyōka Okamura	5	3
7	(Ukraine) Olga Savchuk	7	6

Second round
4	(Australia) Arina Rodionova	1	4
(Japan) Shuko Aoyama	6	6
(Japan) Miki Miyamura	2	3
7	(Ukraine) Olga Savchuk	6	6

Qualifying competition
(Japan) Shuko Aoyama	3	6	6
7	(Ukraine) Olga Savchuk	6	1	1
