= 2017 Japan Women's Open =

- Date: September 11–17
- Edition: 9th
- Category: WTA International
- Draw: 32S / 16D
- Prize money: $250,000
- Surface: Hard
- Location: Tokyo, Japan
- Venue: Ariake Coliseum

Champions

Singles
- (Kazakhstan) Zarina Diyas

Doubles
- (Japan) Shuko Aoyama / (China) Yang Zhaoxuan
← 2016 ·	Japan Women's Open	· 2018 →

The 2017 Japan Women's Open (also known as the Hashimoto Sogyo Japan Women's Open for sponsorship reasons) was a women's tennis tournament played on outdoor hard courts. It was the ninth edition of the Japan Women's Open, and part of the WTA International tournaments of the 2017 WTA Tour. It was held at the Ariake Coliseum in Tokyo, Japan, from September 11 through September 17, 2017. Unseeded Zarina Diyas, who qualified for the main draw, won the singles title.

== Finals ==
=== Singles ===
- (Kazakhstan) Zarina Diyas defeated (Japan) Miyu Kato, 6–2, 7–5

=== Doubles ===
- (Japan) Shuko Aoyama / (China) Yang Zhaoxuan defeated (Australia) Monique Adamczak / (Australia) Storm Sanders, 6–0, 2–6, [10–5]

== Points and prize money ==
Event	W	F	SF	QF	Round of 16	Round of 32	Q	Q3	Q2	Q1
Singles	280	180	110	60	30	1	18	14	10	1
Doubles	280	180	110	60	1	—	—	—	—	—

=== Prize money ===
Event	W	F	SF	QF	Round of 16	Round of 32^{1}	Q	Q2	Q1
Singles	$43,000	$21,400	$11,300	$5,900	$3,310	$2,925	$1,005	$730	$530
Doubles^{2}	$12,300	$6,400	$3,435	$1,820	$960	—	—	—	—
Doubles prize money per team

_{^{1} Qualifiers prize money is also the Round of 32 prize money}

== Singles main-draw entrants ==
=== Seeds ===
Country	Player	Rank^{1}	Seed
FRA	Kristina Mladenovic	13	1
CHN	Zhang Shuai	26	2
BEL	Elise Mertens	39	3
CZE	Kristýna Plíšková	41	4
AUS	Samantha Stosur	44	5
JPN	Naomi Osaka	45	6
USA	Alison Riske	49	7
KAZ	Yulia Putintseva	50	8

- Rankings are as of August 28, 2017

=== Other entrants ===
The following players received wildcards into the singles main draw:

- (Japan) Kimiko Date
- (France) Kristina Mladenovic
- (Czech Republic) Kristýna Plíšková

The following player received entry using a protected ranking:

- (Japan) Misa Eguchi

The following players received entry from the qualifying draw:

- (Kazakhstan) Zarina Diyas
- (Croatia) Jana Fett
- (Japan) Miyu Kato
- (Montenegro) Danka Kovinić

=== Withdrawals ===
Before the tournament

- (United States) Lauren Davis → replaced by (Slovakia) Jana Čepelová
- (Slovakia) Magdaléna Rybáriková → replaced by (Spain) Sara Sorribes Tormo
- (Czech Republic) Kateřina Siniaková → replaced by (Japan) Kurumi Nara
- (Russia) Natalia Vikhlyantseva → replaced by (Netherlands) Richèl Hogenkamp
- (Croatia) Donna Vekić → replaced by (China) Han Xinyun
- (Czech Republic) Markéta Vondroušová → replaced by (Belarus) Aliaksandra Sasnovich
- (China) Zheng Saisai → replaced by (Chinese Taipei) Hsieh Su-wei

== Doubles main-draw entrants ==
=== Seeds ===
Country	Player	Country	Player	Rank^{1}	Seed
JPN	Makoto Ninomiya	CZE	Renata Voráčová	70	1
JPN	Eri Hozumi	JPN	Miyu Kato	78	2
UKR	Lyudmyla Kichenok	SLO	Katarina Srebotnik	82	3
JPN	Shuko Aoyama	CHN	Yang Zhaoxuan	86	4

- ^{1} Rankings are as of August 28, 2017

=== Other entrants ===
The following pairs received wildcards into the doubles main draw:

- (Chinese Taipei) Chuang Chia-jung / (Japan) Misaki Doi
- (Japan) Erina Hayashi / (Japan) Momoko Kobori
