= 2016 Japan Women's Open – Singles =

Singles
- 2016 Japan Women's Open

Final
- Champion: (United States) Christina McHale
- Runner-up: (Czech Republic) Kateřina Siniaková
- Score: 3–6, 6–4, 6–4

Details
- Draw: 32
- Seeds: 8

Events
Singles	Doubles
← 2015 ·	Japan Women's Open	· 2017 →

Yanina Wickmayer was the defending champion, but lost in the first round to Viktorija Golubic.

Christina McHale won her first WTA title, defeating Kateřina Siniaková in the final, 3–6, 6–4, 6–4.

== Seeds ==
1. (Japan) Misaki Doi (first round)
2. (Belgium) Yanina Wickmayer (first round)
3. (Kazakhstan) Yulia Putintseva (second round)
4. (Sweden) Johanna Larsson (second round)
5. (United States) Madison Brengle (first round)
6. (China) Zhang Shuai (semifinals)
7. (United States) Christina McHale (champion)
8. (Ukraine) Kateryna Bondarenko (first round)

== Draw ==
Key

- Q = Qualifier
- WC = Wild card
- LL = Lucky loser
- Alt = Alternate
- ITF = ITF entry
- PR = Protected ranking
- SR = Special ranking
- SE = Special exempt
- JE = Junior exempt
- JR = Junior Accelerator Programme entrant
- CO = College Accelerator Programme entrant
- NG = Next Gen Accelerator Program entrant
- w/o = Walkover
- r = Retired
- d = Defaulted

=== Finals ===
Semifinals
(Czech Republic) Kateřina Siniaková	6	6
6	(China) Zhang Shuai	3	0
(Slovakia) Jana Čepelová	4	6	5
7	(United States) Christina McHale	6	3	7

Final
(Czech Republic) Kateřina Siniaková	6	4	4
7	(United States) Christina McHale	3	6	6

=== Top half ===
First round
1	(Japan) M Doi	5	3
(Belarus) A Sasnovich	7	6
(United States) A Riske	6	6
(Japan) N Hibino	2	4
LL	(Germany) A Lottner	1	4
(Czech Republic) K Siniaková	6	6
(United States) L Chirico	6	7
8	(Ukraine) K Bondarenko	4	5
4	(Sweden) J Larsson	6	6
(Germany) S Lisicki	3	2
WC	(Japan) R Ozaki	0	2
(United States) V Lepchenko	6	6
(Japan) N Osaka	6	6
(Estonia) A Kontaveit	0	2
WC	(Japan) E Hozumi	6^{4}	6	3
6	(China) S Zhang	7^{7}	1	6

Second round
(Belarus) A Sasnovich	3	1
(United States) A Riske	6	6
(Czech Republic) K Siniaková	6	5	7^{7}
(United States) L Chirico	4	7	6^{3}
4	(Sweden) J Larsson	2	6	4
(United States) V Lepchenko	6	3	6
(Japan) N Osaka	3	2
6	(China) S Zhang	6	6

Quarterfinals
(United States) A Riske	2	4
(Czech Republic) K Siniaková	6	6
(United States) V Lepchenko	7^{7}	1	3
6	(China) S Zhang	6^{4}	6	6

Semifinals
(Czech Republic) K Siniaková	6	6
6	(China) S Zhang	3	0

=== Bottom half ===
First round
5	(United States) M Brengle	1	4
(Slovakia) J Čepelová	6	6
Q	(South Korea) S-j Jang	4	6	6
(China) S Zheng	6	3	3
(Austria) T Paszek	2	2
(Japan) K Nara	6	6
(Greece) M Sakkari	4	3
3	(Kazakhstan) Y Putintseva	6	6
7	(United States) C McHale	6	3	7^{7}
(Ukraine) K Kozlova	4	6	6^{5}
Q	(Sweden) R Peterson	6	7^{11}
Q	(Japan) M Kato	3	6^{9}
Q	(Japan) E Sema	1	0
(Poland) M Linette	6	6
(Switzerland) V Golubic	6	7^{9}
2	(Belgium) Y Wickmayer	1	6^{7}

Second round
(Slovakia) J Čepelová	6	6
Q	(South Korea) S-j Jang	3	1
(Japan) K Nara	6	6
3	(Kazakhstan) Y Putintseva	2	2
7	(United States) C McHale	2	6	7^{7}
Q	(Sweden) R Peterson	6	2	6^{4}
(Poland) M Linette	2	7^{7}	3
(Switzerland) V Golubic	6	6^{5}	6

Quarterfinals
(Slovakia) J Čepelová	3	6	6
(Japan) K Nara	6	4	1
7	(United States) C McHale	6	5	6
(Switzerland) V Golubic	3	7	3

Semifinals
(Slovakia) J Čepelová	4	6	5
7	(United States) C McHale	6	3	7

== Qualifying ==
=== Seeds ===
1. (Austria) Tamira Paszek (moved to main draw)
2. (Slovakia) Jana Čepelová (moved to main draw)
3. (United States) Jennifer Brady (first round)
4. (Sweden) Rebecca Peterson (qualified)
5. (Spain) Sara Sorribes Tormo (first round)
6. (United States) Grace Min (withdrew, still playing in Dalian)
7. (Israel) Julia Glushko (first round)
8. (Thailand) Luksika Kumkhum (first round)
9. (Serbia) Aleksandra Krunić (withdrew)
10. (Japan) Hiroko Kuwata (first round)
11. (South Korea) Jang Su-jeong (qualified)
12. (Germany) Antonia Lottner (qualifying competition, lucky loser)

=== Qualifiers ===
1. (Japan) Miyu Kato
2. (South Korea) Jang Su-jeong
3. (Japan) Erika Sema
4. (Sweden) Rebecca Peterson

=== Lucky losers ===
1. (Germany) Antonia Lottner

=== Qualifying draw ===
==== First qualifier ====
First round
5	(Spain) Sara Sorribes Tormo	1	4
(Japan) Miyu Kato	6	6
Alt	(United States) Yuki Chiang	3	6^{4}
(China) Yang Zhaoxuan	6	7^{7}
WC	(Japan) Ayano Shimizu	6	4	6
(Ukraine) Olga Savchuk	3	6	0
(Poland) Urszula Radwańska	6	5	5
12	(Germany) Antonia Lottner	1	7	7

Second round
(Japan) Miyu Kato	7^{7}	6
(China) Yang Zhaoxuan	6^{2}	0
WC	(Japan) Ayano Shimizu	4	0
12	(Germany) Antonia Lottner	6	6

Qualifying competition
(Japan) Miyu Kato	6	6
12	(Germany) Antonia Lottner	3	1

==== Second qualifier ====
First round
7	(Israel) Julia Glushko	6^{5}	6	1
(Uzbekistan) Sabina Sharipova	7^{7}	2	6
(Bulgaria) Aleksandrina Naydenova
Bye
WC	(Japan) Himari Sato	5	4
(Japan) Shuko Aoyama	7	6
(Tunisia) Ons Jabeur	3	2
11	(South Korea) Jang Su-jeong	6	6

Second round
(Uzbekistan) Sabina Sharipova	6	6
(Bulgaria) Aleksandrina Naydenova	3	0
(Japan) Shuko Aoyama	6	5	4
11	(South Korea) Jang Su-jeong	1	7	6

Qualifying competition
(Uzbekistan) Sabina Sharipova	4	4
11	(South Korea) Jang Su-jeong	6	6

==== Third qualifier ====
First round
3	(United States) Jennifer Brady	1	3
(Slovakia) Daniela Hantuchová	6	6
Alt	(Australia) Jessica Moore	1	0
WC	(Japan) Miharu Imanishi	6	6
Alt	(Czech Republic) Renata Voráčová	0	2
(China) Xu Yifan	6	6
(Japan) Erika Sema	6	6
10	(Japan) Hiroko Kuwata	3	3

Second round
(Slovakia) Daniela Hantuchová	6	2	6
WC	(Japan) Miharu Imanishi	2	6	0
(China) Xu Yifan	6	2^{r}
(Japan) Erika Sema	2	3

Qualifying competition
(Slovakia) Daniela Hantuchová	4	6	3
(Japan) Erika Sema	6	3	6

==== Fourth qualifier ====
First round
4	(Sweden) Rebecca Peterson	7^{7}	6
(Japan) Riko Sawayanagi	6^{3}	1
(South Korea) Han Na-lae	4	6	6
(Australia) Arina Rodionova	6	4	4
WC	(Japan) Makoto Ninomiya	3	1
(Japan) Ayaka Okuno	6	6
(Thailand) Varatchaya Wongteanchai	6	1	6
8	(Thailand) Luksika Kumkhum	3	6	4

Second round
4	(Sweden) Rebecca Peterson	6	6
(South Korea) Han Na-lae	3	4
(Japan) Ayaka Okuno	2	3
(Thailand) Varatchaya Wongteanchai	6	6

Qualifying competition
4	(Sweden) Rebecca Peterson	6	6
(Thailand) Varatchaya Wongteanchai	1	1
