= 2015 Japan Women's Open – Doubles =

Doubles
- 2015 Japan Women's Open

Final
- Champions: (Chinese Taipei) Chan Hao-ching (Chinese Taipei) Chan Yung-jan
- Runners-up: (Japan) Misaki Doi (Japan) Kurumi Nara
- Score: 6–1, 6–2

Details
- Draw: 16
- Seeds: 4

Events
| Singles | Doubles |
| ← 2014 · | Japan Women's Open | · 2016 → |

Shuko Aoyama and Renata Voráčová were the defending champions, but Voráčová chose not to participate. Aoyama partnered Makoto Ninomiya, but they lost in quarterfinals to Chuang Chia-jung and Liang Chen.
Chan Hao-ching and Chan Yung-jan won the title, defeating Misaki Doi and Kurumi Nara in the final, 6–1, 6–2.

== Seeds ==
1. (Chinese Taipei) Chan Hao-ching / (Chinese Taipei) Chan Yung-jan (champions)
2. (Chinese Taipei) Chuang Chia-jung / (China) Liang Chen (semifinals)
3. (Canada) Gabriela Dabrowski / (Poland) Alicja Rosolska (quarterfinals)
4. (China) Xu Yifan / (China) Zheng Saisai (quarterfinals)

== Draw ==
Key

- Q = Qualifier
- WC = Wild card
- LL = Lucky loser
- Alt = Alternate
- ITF = ITF entry
- PR = Protected ranking
- SR = Special ranking
- SE = Special exempt
- JE = Junior exempt
- JR = Junior Accelerator Programme entrant
- CO = College Accelerator Programme entrant
- NG = Next Gen Accelerator Program entrant
- w/o = Walkover
- r = Retired
- d = Defaulted

=== Draw ===
First round
1 | (Chinese Taipei) H-c Chan (Chinese Taipei) Y-j Chan | 6 | 6
(Japan) K Date-Krumm (Australia) J Gajdošová | 3 | 2
(Kazakhstan) Z Diyas (United States) N Melichar | 7^{7} | 6
WC | (Japan) E Hozumi (Japan) M Kato | 6^{4} | 3
3 | (Canada) G Dabrowski (Poland) A Rosolska | 6^{6} | 7^{7} | [10]
(Chinese Taipei) C-w Chan (Croatia) D Jurak | 7^{8} | 6^{3} | [5]
(Ukraine) K Bondarenko (Ukraine) O Savchuk | 6 | 6
(Netherlands) K Bertens (Sweden) J Larsson | 1 | 3
WC | (Japan) M Doi (Japan) K Nara | 7^{8} | 6
(Poland) M Linette (China) K Zhang | 6^{6} | 2
(China) Y Wang (China) Z Yang | 5 | 6 | [6]
4 | (China) Y Xu (China) S Zheng | 7 | 3 | [10]
(Japan) S Aoyama (Japan) M Ninomiya | 7 | 6
(Russia) A Panova (Czech Republic) K Siniaková | 5 | 2
(United States) C McHale (Croatia) A Tomljanović | 1 | 2
2 | (Chinese Taipei) C-j Chuang (China) C Liang | 6 | 6

Quarterfinals
1 | (Chinese Taipei) H-c Chan (Chinese Taipei) Y-j Chan | 6 | 6
(Kazakhstan) Z Diyas (United States) N Melichar | 1 | 3
3 | (Canada) G Dabrowski (Poland) A Rosolska | 5 | 4
(Ukraine) K Bondarenko (Ukraine) O Savchuk | 7 | 6
WC | (Japan) M Doi (Japan) K Nara | 3 | 6 | [10]
4 | (China) Y Xu (China) S Zheng | 6 | 3 | [5]
(Japan) S Aoyama (Japan) M Ninomiya | 2 | 4
2 | (Chinese Taipei) C-j Chuang (China) C Liang | 6 | 6

Semifinals
1 | (Chinese Taipei) H-c Chan (Chinese Taipei) Y-j Chan | 6 | 6
(Ukraine) K Bondarenko (Ukraine) O Savchuk | 3 | 2
WC | (Japan) M Doi (Japan) K Nara | 6 | 6
2 | (Chinese Taipei) C-j Chuang (China) C Liang | 3 | 3

Final
1 | (Chinese Taipei) H-c Chan (Chinese Taipei) Y-j Chan | 6 | 6
WC | (Japan) M Doi (Japan) K Nara | 1 | 2
