= 2014 Japan Women's Open =

- Date: October 6–12
- Edition: 6th
- Category: WTA International
- Surface: Hard / Outdoor
- Location: Osaka, Japan
- Venue: Utsubo Tennis Center

Champions

Singles
- (Australia) Samantha Stosur

Doubles
- (Japan) Shuko Aoyama / (Czech Republic) Renata Voráčová
← 2013 ·	Japan Women's Open	· 2015 →

The 2014 Japan Women's Open was a women's tennis tournament played on outdoor hard courts. It was the sixth edition of the Japan Women's Open, and part of the WTA International tournaments of the 2014 WTA Tour. It was held at the Utsubo Tennis Center in Osaka, Japan, from October 6 through October 12, 2014. First-seeded Samantha Stosur won the singles title.

== Finals ==
=== Singles ===
(Australia) Samantha Stosur defeated (Kazakhstan) Zarina Diyas, 7–6^{(9–7)}, 6–3

- It was Stosur's 1st title of the year, her 3rd title at the HP Open, and the 6th title of her career.

=== Doubles ===
(Japan) Shuko Aoyama / (Czech Republic) Renata Voráčová defeated (Spain) Lara Arruabarrena / (Germany) Tatjana Maria, 6–1, 6–2

== Points and prize money ==
=== Point distribution ===
Event	W	F	SF	QF	Round of 16	Round of 32	Q	Q3	Q2	Q1
Singles	280	180	110	60	30	1	18	14	10	1
Doubles	280	180	110	60	1	—	—	—	—	—

=== Prize money ===
Event	W	F	SF	QF	Round of 16	Round of 32^{1}	Q3	Q2	Q1
Singles	$43,000	$21,400	$11,300	$5,900	$3,310	$1,925	$1,005	$730	$530
Doubles	$12,300	$6,400	$3,435	$1,820	$960	—	—	—	—
Doubles prize money per team

_{^{1} Qualifiers prize money is also the Round of 32 prize money}

== Singles main-draw entrants ==
=== Seeds ===
Country	Player	Rank^{1}	Seed
AUS	Samantha Stosur	21	1
USA	Madison Keys	32	2
UKR	Elina Svitolina	33	3
USA	CoCo Vandeweghe	38	4
KAZ	Zarina Diyas	39	5
GBR	Heather Watson	47	6
USA	Christina McHale	52	7
USA	Lauren Davis	55	8

- Rankings are as of September 29, 2014

=== Other entrants ===
The following players received wildcards into the singles main draw:

- (France) Kristina Mladenovic
- (Japan) Naomi Osaka
- (Japan) Risa Ozaki

The following player received entry using a protected ranking into the singles main draw:

- (Germany) Tatjana Maria

The following players received entry from the qualifying draw:

- (Japan) Shuko Aoyama
- (Romania) Ana Bogdan
- (Chinese Taipei) Chan Yung-jan
- (Japan) Hiroko Kuwata

The following player received entry as a lucky loser:

- (Japan) Miharu Imanishi

=== Withdrawals ===
Before the tournament

- (Japan) Kimiko Date-Krumm → replaced by (Japan) Erika Sema
- (Australia) Casey Dellacqua (lower leg injury) → replaced by (Germany) Tatjana Maria
- (Germany) Julia Görges → replaced by (Japan) Misa Eguchi
- (Japan) Kurumi Nara (respiratory illness) → replaced by (Japan) Miharu Imanishi
- (Argentina) Paula Ormaechea → replaced by (United States) Bethanie Mattek-Sands
- (Belgium) Alison Van Uytvanck → replaced by (United States) Sachia Vickery

=== Retirements ===
- (Australia) Jarmila Gajdošová (left ankle sprain)
- (United States) Madison Keys (right rib injury)

== Doubles main-draw entrants ==
=== Seeds ===
Country	Player	Country	Player	Rank^{1}	Seed
TPE	Chan Hao-ching	TPE	Chan Yung-jan	59	1
POL	Klaudia Jans-Ignacik	FRA	Kristina Mladenovic	79	2
USA	Lisa Raymond	AUS	Samantha Stosur	84	3
CRO	Darija Jurak	USA	Megan Moulton-Levy	114	4

- ^{1} Rankings are as of September 29, 2014

=== Other entrants ===
The following pairs received wildcards into the doubles main draw:

- (Japan) Kyōka Okamura / (Japan) Kotomi Takahata
- (Japan) Naomi Osaka / (Japan) Risa Ozaki
