= 2015 Japan Women's Open – Singles =

Singles
- 2015 Japan Women's Open

Final
- Champion: (Belgium) Yanina Wickmayer
- Runner-up: (Poland) Magda Linette
- Score: 4–6, 6–3, 6–3

Details
- Draw: 32
- Seeds: 8

Events
| Singles | Doubles |
| ← 2014 · | Japan Women's Open | · 2016 → |

Samantha Stosur was the defending champion, but chose not to participate.

Yanina Wickmayer won the title, defeating Magda Linette in the final 4–6, 6–3, 6–3.

== Seeds ==
1. (Spain) Carla Suárez Navarro (first round)
2. (Kazakhstan) Zarina Diyas (second round)
3. (United States) Madison Brengle (quarterfinals)
4. (United States) Alison Riske (first round)
5. (Sweden) Johanna Larsson (second round)
6. (United States) Christina McHale (semifinals)
7. (Croatia) Ajla Tomljanović (semifinals)
8. (Slovenia) Polona Hercog (first round)

== Draw ==
Key

- Q = Qualifier
- WC = Wild card
- LL = Lucky loser
- Alt = Alternate
- ITF = ITF entry
- PR = Protected ranking
- SR = Special ranking
- SE = Special exempt
- JE = Junior exempt
- JR = Junior Accelerator Programme entrant
- CO = College Accelerator Programme entrant
- NG = Next Gen Accelerator Program entrant
- w/o = Walkover
- r = Retired
- d = Defaulted

=== Finals ===
Semifinals
(Belgium) Yanina Wickmayer | 7 | 6
7 | (Croatia) Ajla Tomljanović | 5 | 2
6 | (United States) Christina McHale | 6 | 4 | 3
(Poland) Magda Linette | 3 | 6 | 6

Final
(Belgium) Yanina Wickmayer | 4 | 6 | 6
(Poland) Magda Linette | 6 | 3 | 3

=== Top half ===
First round
1/WC | (Spain) C Suárez Navarro | 4 | 4
(Ukraine) K Bondarenko | 6 | 6
(Australia) J Gajdošová | 6 | 6
Q | (Russia) A Panova | 3 | 4
(Czech Republic) K Siniaková | 4 | 3
(Belgium) Y Wickmayer | 6 | 6
(China) Q Wang | 6 | 3 | 3
5 | (Sweden) J Larsson | 0 | 6 | 6
3 | (United States) M Brengle | 6 | 6
(Germany) A-L Friedsam | 3 | 1
WC | (Japan) N Hibino | 3 | 6 | 6
Q | (Japan) H Kuwata | 6 | 4 | 4
WC | (Japan) K Date-Krumm | 6 | 6
(Japan) M Doi | 4 | 2
(Hungary) T Babos | 6 | 4 | 6^{2}
7 | (Croatia) A Tomljanović | 3 | 6 | 7^{7}

Second round
(Ukraine) K Bondarenko | 6 | 3 | 6
(Australia) J Gajdošová | 1 | 6 | 4
(Belgium) Y Wickmayer | 7 | 6
5 | (Sweden) J Larsson | 5 | 3
3 | (United States) M Brengle | 6 | 6
WC | (Japan) N Hibino | 1 | 2
WC | (Japan) K Date-Krumm | 6^{5} | 3
7 | (Croatia) A Tomljanović | 7^{7} | 6

Quarterfinals
(Ukraine) K Bondarenko | 6 | 3 | 4
(Belgium) Y Wickmayer | 3 | 6 | 6
3 | (United States) M Brengle | 6 | 3 | 4
7 | (Croatia) A Tomljanović | 1 | 6 | 6

Semifinals
(Belgium) Y Wickmayer | 7 | 6
7 | (Croatia) A Tomljanović | 5 | 2

=== Bottom half ===
First round
6 | (United States) C McHale | 6 | 7
(Kazakhstan) Y Putintseva | 3 | 5
(Serbia) B Jovanovski | 1 | 1
Q | (Japan) R Ozaki | 6 | 6
Q | (Japan) N Osaka | 7 | 5 | 3
(United States) I Falconi | 5 | 7 | 6
(China) S Zheng | 0 | 6 | 6
4 | (United States) A Riske | 6 | 4 | 1
8 | (Slovenia) P Hercog | 1 | 7 | 5
(Chinese Taipei) S-w Hsieh | 6 | 5 | 7
(Romania) A Mitu | 1 | 4
(Japan) K Nara | 6 | 6
(Poland) M Linette | 6 | 6
(United States) L Davis | 3 | 2
(Netherlands) K Bertens | 4 | 4
2 | (Kazakhstan) Z Diyas | 6 | 6

Second round
6 | (United States) C McHale | 6 | 7
Q | (Japan) R Ozaki | 1 | 5
(United States) I Falconi | 4 | 2
(China) S Zheng | 6 | 6
(Chinese Taipei) S-w Hsieh | 6 | 6
(Japan) K Nara | 2 | 4
(Poland) M Linette | 6 | 7
2 | (Kazakhstan) Z Diyas | 2 | 5

Quarterfinals
6 | (United States) C McHale | 2 | 6 | 6
(China) S Zheng | 6 | 3 | 3
(Chinese Taipei) S-w Hsieh | 3 | 3
(Poland) M Linette | 6 | 6

Semifinals
6 | (United States) C McHale | 6 | 4 | 3
(Poland) M Linette | 3 | 6 | 6

== Qualifying ==
=== Seeds ===
1. (Czech Republic) Kristýna Plíšková (second round)
2. (Romania) Patricia Maria Țig (qualifying competition)
3. (Spain) María Teresa Torró Flor (qualifying competition; retired)
4. (China) Wang Yafan (second round)
5. (Russia) Alexandra Panova (qualified)
6. (Switzerland) Stefanie Vögele (first round)
7. (Japan) Risa Ozaki (qualified)
8. (Croatia) Petra Martić (withdrew, still playing in Dalian)

=== Qualifiers ===
1. (Japan) Hiroko Kuwata
2. (Russia) Alexandra Panova
3. (Japan) Risa Ozaki
4. (Japan) Naomi Osaka

=== Qualifying draw ===
==== First qualifier ====
First round
1 | (Czech Republic) Kristýna Plíšková | 6 | 7
(Japan) Eri Hozumi | 4 | 5
(Japan) Shuko Aoyama | 6 | 7
WC | (Japan) Chihiro Muramatsu | 0 | 5
Alt | (Ukraine) Olga Savchuk | 6 | 6
(Spain) Sara Sorribes Tormo | 2 | 2
(Japan) Hiroko Kuwata | 5 | 6 | 6
6 | (Switzerland) Stefanie Vögele | 7 | 0 | 4

Second round
1 | (Czech Republic) Kristýna Plíšková | 2 | 3
(Japan) Shuko Aoyama | 6 | 6
Alt | (Ukraine) Olga Savchuk | 2 | 1
(Japan) Hiroko Kuwata | 6 | 6

Qualifying competition
(Japan) Shuko Aoyama | 4 | 6 | 6^{6}
(Japan) Hiroko Kuwata | 6 | 4 | 7^{8}

==== Second qualifier ====
First round
2 | (Romania) Patricia Maria Țig | 6 | 7^{7}
(Spain) Paula Badosa Gibert | 3 | 6^{5}
WC | (Japan) Miyabi Inoue | 7^{7} | 0 | 6
(South Korea) Han Na-lae | 6^{5} | 6 | 2
Alt | (South Korea) Jang Su-jeong | 6^{2} | 0
WC | (Japan) Makoto Ninomiya | 7^{7} | 6
(Poland) Katarzyna Piter | 6^{5} | 6^{5}
5 | (Russia) Alexandra Panova | 7^{7} | 7^{7}

Second round
2 | (Romania) Patricia Maria Țig | 6 | 6
WC | (Japan) Miyabi Inoue | 1 | 3
WC | (Japan) Makoto Ninomiya | 1 | 3
5 | (Russia) Alexandra Panova | 6 | 6

Qualifying competition
2 | (Romania) Patricia Maria Țig | 4 | 3
5 | (Russia) Alexandra Panova | 6 | 6

==== Third qualifier ====
First round
3 | (Spain) María Teresa Torró Flor | 6 | 6
(Romania) Sorana Cîrstea | 3 | 4
(Canada) Gabriela Dabrowski | 7^{8} | 2 | 4
WC | (Japan) Erika Sema | 6^{6} | 6 | 6
(China) Yang Zhaoxuan | 6 | 2 | 6
(Japan) Riko Sawayanagi | 2 | 6 | 3
(Czech Republic) Tereza Martincová | 4 | 4
7 | (Japan) Risa Ozaki | 6 | 6

Second round
3 | (Spain) María Teresa Torró Flor | 6 | 6
WC | (Japan) Erika Sema | 2 | 0
(China) Yang Zhaoxuan | 6^{3} | 2
7 | (Japan) Risa Ozaki | 7^{7} | 6

Qualifying competition
3 | (Spain) María Teresa Torró Flor | 0^{r}
7 | (Japan) Risa Ozaki | 2

==== Fourth qualifier ====
First round
4 | (China) Wang Yafan | 6 | 6
(Japan) Miyu Kato | 0 | 1
(Japan) Junri Namigata | 4 | 3
(Japan) Naomi Osaka | 6 | 6
(Thailand) Luksika Kumkhum | 4 | 7 | 6
(Japan) Misa Eguchi | 6 | 5 | 4
(China) Xu Yifan | 6 | 6
Alt | (India) Ankita Raina | 0 | 3

Second round
4 | (China) Wang Yafan | 3 | 1
(Japan) Naomi Osaka | 6 | 6
(Thailand) Luksika Kumkhum | 7^{9} | 3 | 6
(China) Xu Yifan | 6^{7} | 6 | 3

Qualifying competition
(Japan) Naomi Osaka | 7^{8} | 6
(Thailand) Luksika Kumkhum | 6^{6} | 1
