= 2015 Japan Women's Open =

- Date: September 14–20
- Edition: 7th
- Category: WTA International
- Draw: 32S / 16D
- Prize money: US$250,000
- Surface: Hard
- Location: Tokyo, Japan
- Venue: Ariake Coliseum

Champions

Singles
- (Belgium) Yanina Wickmayer

Doubles
- (Chinese Taipei) Chan Hao-ching / (Chinese Taipei) Chan Yung-jan
← 2014 ·	Japan Women's Open	· 2016 →

The 2015 Japan Women's Open was a women's tennis tournament played on outdoor hard courts. It was the seventh edition of the Japan Women's Open, and part of the WTA International tournaments of the 2015 WTA Tour. It was held at the Ariake Coliseum in Tokyo, Japan, from September 14 through September 20, 2015. The tournament was moved from Osaka to Tokyo starting this year. Unseeded Yanina Wickmayer won the singles title.

== Finals ==
=== Singles ===
- (Belgium) Yanina Wickmayer defeated (Poland) Magda Linette, 4–6, 6–3, 6–3

=== Doubles ===
- (Chinese Taipei) Chan Hao-ching / (Chinese Taipei) Chan Yung-jan defeated (Japan) Misaki Doi / (Japan) Kurumi Nara, 6–1, 6–2

== Points and prize money ==
Event	W	F	SF	QF	Round of 16	Round of 32	Q	Q3	Q2	Q1
Singles	280	180	110	60	30	1	18	14	10	1
Doubles	280	180	110	60	1	—	—	—	—	—

=== Prize money ===
Event	W	F	SF	QF	Round of 16	Round of 32^{1}	Q2	Q1
Singles	$43,000	$21,400	$11,500	$6,175	$3,400	$2,100	$1,020	$600
Doubles^{2}	$12,300	$6,400	$3,435	$1,820	$960	—	—	—
Doubles prize money per team

_{^{1} Qualifiers prize money is also the Round of 32 prize money}

== Singles main-draw entrants ==
=== Seeds ===
Country	Player	Rank^{1}	Seed
ESP	Carla Suárez Navarro	10	1
KAZ	Zarina Diyas	35	2
USA	Madison Brengle	47	3
USA	Alison Riske	57	4
SWE	Johanna Larsson	58	5
USA	Christina McHale	59	6
CRO	Ajla Tomljanović	63	7
SLO	Polona Hercog	64	8

- Rankings are as of August 31, 2015.

=== Other entrants ===
The following players received wildcards into the singles main draw:

- (Japan) Kimiko Date-Krumm
- (Japan) Nao Hibino
- (Spain) Carla Suárez Navarro

The following players received entry from the qualifying draw:

- (Japan) Hiroko Kuwata
- (Japan) Naomi Osaka
- (Japan) Risa Ozaki
- (Russia) Alexandra Panova

=== Withdrawals ===
Before the tournament

- (Slovakia) Jana Čepelová → replaced by (Netherlands) Kiki Bertens
- (Russia) Margarita Gasparyan → replaced by (Serbia) Bojana Jovanovski
- (Italy) Karin Knapp → replaced by (Japan) Misaki Doi
- (Slovakia) Anna Karolína Schmiedlová → replaced by (Chinese Taipei) Hsieh Su-wei
- (Czech Republic) Barbora Strýcová → replaced by (Ukraine) Kateryna Bondarenko

== Doubles main-draw entrants ==
=== Seeds ===
Country	Player	Country	Player	Rank^{1}	Seed
TPE	Chan Hao-ching	TPE	Chan Yung-jan	42	1
TPE	Chuang Chia-jung	CHN	Liang Chen	78	2
CAN	Gabriela Dabrowski	POL	Alicja Rosolska	90	3
CHN	Xu Yifan	CHN	Zheng Saisai	99	4

- ^{1} Rankings are as of August 31, 2015.

=== Other entrants ===
The following pairs received wildcards into the doubles main draw:

- (Japan) Misaki Doi / (Japan) Kurumi Nara
- (Japan) Eri Hozumi / (Japan) Miyu Kato
