= 2016 Japan Women's Open =

- Date: September 12–18
- Edition: 8th
- Category: WTA International
- Draw: 32S / 16D
- Prize money: $250,000
- Surface: Hard
- Location: Tokyo, Japan
- Venue: Ariake Coliseum

Champions

Singles
- (United States) Christina McHale

Doubles
- (Japan) Shuko Aoyama / (Japan) Makoto Ninomiya
← 2015 ·	Japan Women's Open	· 2017 →

The 2016 Japan Women's Open (also known as the 2016 Hashimoto Sogyo Japan Women's Open for sponsorship reasons) was a women's tennis tournament played on outdoor hard courts. It was the eighth edition of the Japan Women's Open, and part of the WTA International tournaments of the 2016 WTA Tour. It was held at the Ariake Coliseum in Tokyo, Japan, from September 12 through September 18, 2016. Seventh-seeded Christina McHale won the singls title.

== Finals ==
=== Singles ===
(United States) Christina McHale defeated (Czech Republic) Kateřina Siniaková, 3–6, 6–4, 6–4

- It was McHale's only WTA singles title of her career to date.

=== Doubles ===
(Japan) Shuko Aoyama / (Japan) Makoto Ninomiya defeated (United Kingdom) Jocelyn Rae / (United Kingdom) Anna Smith, 6–3, 6–3

== Points and prize money ==
Event	W	F	SF	QF	Round of 16	Round of 32	Q	Q3	Q2	Q1
Singles	280	180	110	60	30	1	18	14	10	1
Doubles	280	180	110	60	1	—	—	—	—	—

=== Prize money ===
Event	W	F	SF	QF	Round of 16	Round of 32^{1}	Q	Q2	Q1
Singles	$43,000	$21,400	$11,300	$5,900	$3,310	$2,925	$1,005	$730	$530
Doubles^{2}	$12,300	$6,400	$3,435	$1,820	$960	—	—	—	—
Doubles prize money per team

_{^{1} Qualifiers prize money is also the Round of 32 prize money}

== Singles main-draw entrants ==
=== Seeds ===
Country	Player	Rank^{1}	Seed
JPN	Misaki Doi	32	1
BEL	Yanina Wickmayer	38	2
KAZ	Yulia Putintseva	42	3
SWE	Johanna Larsson	47	4
USA	Madison Brengle	50	5
CHN	Zhang Shuai	51	6
USA	Christina McHale	55	7
UKR	Kateryna Bondarenko	59	8

- Rankings are as of August 29, 2016

=== Other entrants ===
The following players received wildcards into the singles main draw:

- ~~(Japan) Misa Eguchi~~
- (Japan) Eri Hozumi
- (Japan) Risa Ozaki

The following players received entry from the qualifying draw:

- (South Korea) Jang Su-jeong
- (Japan) Miyu Kato
- (Sweden) Rebecca Peterson
- (Japan) Erika Sema

The following players received entry as a lucky loser:

- (Germany) Antonia Lottner

=== Withdrawals ===
Before the tournament

- (Japan) Misa Eguchi → replaced by (Germany) Antonia Lottner
- (United States) Irina Falconi → replaced by (Japan) Kurumi Nara
- (Belgium) Kirsten Flipkens → replaced by (Slovakia) Jana Čepelová
- (United States) Nicole Gibbs → replaced by (Poland) Magda Linette
- (Chinese Taipei) Hsieh Su-wei → replaced by (Estonia) Anett Kontaveit
- (Slovakia) Kristína Kučová → replaced by (Japan) Naomi Osaka
- (Latvia) Jeļena Ostapenko → replaced by (Austria) Tamira Paszek
- (Latvia) Anastasija Sevastova → replaced by (Japan) Nao Hibino
- (China) Wang Qiang → replaced by (Greece) Maria Sakkari

== Doubles main-draw entrants ==
=== Seeds ===
Country	Player	Country	Player	Rank^{1}	Seed
CHN	Xu Yifan	CHN	Zheng Saisai	46	1
UKR	Kateryna Bondarenko	TPE	Chuang Chia-jung	98	2
SRB	Aleksandra Krunić	CZE	Kateřina Siniaková	99	3
CHN	Liang Chen	CHN	Yang Zhaoxuan	114	4

- ^{1} Rankings are as of August 29, 2016

=== Other entrants ===
The following pairs received wildcards into the doubles main draw:

- (Slovakia) Daniela Hantuchová / (United States) Alison Riske
- (Japan) Kanae Hisami / (Japan) Kotomi Takahata
