= 2013 HP Open =

Women's tennis tournament

- Date: 7–13 October
- Edition: 5th
- Category: WTA International
- Surface: Hard / outdoor
- Location: Osaka, Japan
- Venue: Utsubo Tennis Center

Champions

Singles
- (Australia) Samantha Stosur

Doubles
- (France) Kristina Mladenovic / (Italy) Flavia Pennetta
← 2012 ·	Japan Women's Open	· 2014 →

The 2013 HP Open was a women's tennis tournament played on outdoor hard courts sponsored by Hewlett-Packard. It was the fifth edition of the HP Open, and part of the WTA International tournaments of the 2013 WTA Tour. It was held at the Utsubo Tennis Center in Osaka, Japan, from October 7 through October 13, 2013.

== Finals ==
=== Singles ===
(Australia) Samantha Stosur defeated (Canada) Eugenie Bouchard, 3–6, 7–5, 6–2

- It was Stosur's 2nd title of the year and the 5th of her career.

=== Doubles ===
(France) Kristina Mladenovic / (Italy) Flavia Pennetta defeated (Australia) Samantha Stosur / (China) Zhang Shuai, 6–4, 6–3

== Singles main-draw entrants ==
=== Seeds ===
Country	Player	Rank^{1}	Seed
~~SRB~~	~~Jelena Janković~~	~~11~~	~~1~~
GER	Sabine Lisicki	16	2
AUS	Samantha Stosur	20	3
ITA	Flavia Pennetta	29	4
CAN	Eugenie Bouchard	36	5
USA	Madison Keys	40	6
GBR	Laura Robson	41	7
PUR	Monica Puig	45	8
FRA	Kristina Mladenovic	47	9

- Rankings are as of September 30, 2013

=== Other entrants ===
The following players received wildcards into the singles main draw:

- (Japan) Kurumi Nara
- (United Kingdom) Laura Robson

The following players received entry from the qualifying draw:

- (Slovakia) Anna Karolína Schmiedlová
- (Thailand) Luksika Kumkhum
- (Czech Republic) Barbora Záhlavová-Strýcová
- (Switzerland) Belinda Bencic

The following player received entry as a lucky loser:

- (United States) Vania King

=== Withdrawals ===
Before the tournament

- (New Zealand) Marina Erakovic
- (United States) Jamie Hampton
- (Serbia) Jelena Janković (left hip injury)
- (United States) Bethanie Mattek-Sands
- (Israel) Shahar Pe'er (planta fascia injury)
- (Kazakhstan) Yaroslava Shvedova
- (Kazakhstan) Galina Voskoboeva
- (United States) Venus Williams

During the tournament

- (Germany) Sabine Lisicki (left hip injury)

== Doubles main-draw entrants ==
=== Seeds ===
Country	Player	Country	Player	Rank^{1}	Seed
USA	Raquel Kops-Jones	USA	Abigail Spears	44	1
FRA	Kristina Mladenovic	ITA	Flavia Pennetta	66	2
USA	Varvara Lepchenko	CHN	Zheng Saisai	81	3
ESP	Anabel Medina Garrigues	ESP	Sílvia Soler Espinosa	81	4

- ^{1} Rankings are as of September 30, 2013

=== Other entrants ===
The following pairs received wildcards into the doubles main draw:

- (Japan) Misaki Doi / (Japan) Miki Miyamura
- (Japan) Kurumi Nara / (Japan) Risa Ozaki

=== Withdrawals ===
During the tournament

- (Slovenia) Polona Hercog (back injury)
- (United States) Varvara Lepchenko (gastrointestinal illness)
