= 2014 Japan Women's Open – Doubles =

Doubles
- 2014 Japan Women's Open

Final
- Champions: (Japan) Shuko Aoyama (Czech Republic) Renata Voráčová
- Runners-up: (Spain) Lara Arruabarrena (Germany) Tatjana Maria
- Score: 6-1, 6-2

Details
- Draw: 16
- Seeds: 4

Events
| Singles | Doubles |
| ← 2013 · | Japan Women's Open | · 2015 → |

Kristina Mladenovic and Flavia Pennetta were the defending champions, but Pennetta chose to participate in Tianjin instead. Mladenovic partnered Klaudia Jans-Ignacik, but lost in the first round to Lara Arruabarrena and Tatjana Maria.
Shuko Aoyama and Renata Voráčová won the title, defeating Arruabarrena and Maria in the final, 6-1, 6-2.

== Seeds ==
1. (Chinese Taipei) Chan Hao-ching / (Chinese Taipei) Chan Yung-jan (semifinals)
2. (Poland) Klaudia Jans-Ignacik / (France) Kristina Mladenovic (first round)
3. (United States) Lisa Raymond / (Australia) Samantha Stosur (quarterfinals)
4. (Croatia) Darija Jurak / (United States) Megan Moulton-Levy (semifinals)

== Draw ==
Key

- Q = Qualifier
- WC = Wild card
- LL = Lucky loser
- Alt = Alternate
- ITF = ITF entry
- PR = Protected ranking
- SR = Special ranking
- SE = Special exempt
- JE = Junior exempt
- JR = Junior Accelerator Programme entrant
- CO = College Accelerator Programme entrant
- NG = Next Gen Accelerator Program entrant
- w/o = Walkover
- r = Retired
- d = Defaulted

=== Draw ===
First round
1 | (Chinese Taipei) H-c Chan (Chinese Taipei) Y-j Chan | 6 | 3 | [10]
(Japan) M Ninomiya (Japan) M Tanaka | 1 | 6 | [5]
(Japan) M Eguchi (Japan) E Hozumi | 6 | 6
WC | (Japan) N Osaka (Japan) R Ozaki | 2 | 1
3 | (United States) L Raymond (Australia) S Stosur | 6 | 4 | [10]
(United States) C McHale (United Kingdom) H Watson | 4 | 6 | 4
(Japan) S Aoyama (Czech Republic) R Voráčová | 6 | 7
(Japan) H Kuwata (Thailand) N Lertcheewakarn | 3 | 5
(Japan) M Doi (Ukraine) E Svitolina | 3 | 6 | [8]
WC | (Japan) K Okamura (Japan) K Takahata | 6 | 3 | [10]
(Japan) M Miyamura (Japan) J Namigata | 5 | 1
4 | (Croatia) D Jurak (United States) M Moulton-Levy | 7 | 6
(Japan) E Sema (Japan) Y Sema | 6 | 6
(Japan) N Hibino (Japan) R Sawayanagi | 4 | 2
(Spain) L Arruabarrena (Germany) T Maria | 7^{7} | 1 | [10]
2 | (Poland) K Jans-Ignacik (France) K Mladenovic | 6^{5} | 6 | [6]

Quarterfinals
1 | (Chinese Taipei) H-c Chan (Chinese Taipei) Y-j Chan | 6 | 6
(Japan) M Eguchi (Japan) E Hozumi | 1 | 1
3 | (United States) L Raymond (Australia) S Stosur | 0 | 4
(Japan) S Aoyama (Czech Republic) R Voráčová | 6 | 6
WC | (Japan) K Okamura (Japan) K Takahata | 3 | 5
4 | (Croatia) D Jurak (United States) M Moulton-Levy | 6 | 7
(Japan) E Sema (Japan) Y Sema | 4 | 5
(Spain) L Arruabarrena (Germany) T Maria | 6 | 7

Semifinals
1 | (Chinese Taipei) H-c Chan (Chinese Taipei) Y-j Chan | 4 | 3
(Japan) S Aoyama (Czech Republic) R Voráčová | 6 | 6
4 | (Croatia) D Jurak (United States) M Moulton-Levy | 3 | 4
(Spain) L Arruabarrena (Germany) T Maria | 6 | 6

Final
(Japan) S Aoyama (Czech Republic) R Voráčová | 6 | 6
(Spain) L Arruabarrena (Germany) T Maria | 1 | 2
