= 2013 HP Open – Singles =

Singles
- 2013 HP Open

Final
- Champion: (Australia) Samantha Stosur
- Runner-up: (Canada) Eugenie Bouchard
- Score: 3–6, 7–5, 6–2

Events
Singles	Doubles
- HP Open

Heather Watson was the defending champion, but she lost in the first round to Monica Puig.

Samantha Stosur won the title for the second time, defeating Eugenie Bouchard in the final, 3–6, 7–5, 6–2.

== Seeds ==
1. (Serbia) Jelena Janković (withdrew because of a left hip injury)
2. (Germany) Sabine Lisicki (second round, withdrew because of a left hip injury)
3. (Australia) Samantha Stosur (champion)
4. (Italy) Flavia Pennetta (first round)
5. (Canada) Eugenie Bouchard (final)
6. (United States) Madison Keys (semifinals)
7. (United Kingdom) Laura Robson (first round)
8. (Puerto Rico) Monica Puig (second round)
9. (France) Kristina Mladenovic (second round)

== Draw ==
Key

- Q = Qualifier
- WC = Wild card
- LL = Lucky loser
- Alt = Alternate
- ITF = ITF entry
- PR = Protected ranking
- SR = Special ranking
- SE = Special exempt
- JE = Junior exempt
- JR = Junior Accelerator Programme entrant
- CO = College Accelerator Programme entrant
- NG = Next Gen Accelerator Program entrant
- w/o = Walkover
- r = Retired
- d = Defaulted

=== Finals ===
Semifinals
6	(United States) Madison Keys	1	2
3	(Australia) Samantha Stosur	6	6
5	(Canada) Eugenie Bouchard	6	6
WC	(Japan) Kurumi Nara	2	2

Final
3	(Australia) Samantha Stosur	3	7	6
5	(Canada) Eugenie Bouchard	6	5	2

=== Top half ===
First round
9	(France) K Mladenovic	7^{7}	6
(Canada) A Wozniak	6^{4}	4
(Canada) S Fichman	2	1
(China) J Zheng	6	6
(China) S Zhang	6	6
(Spain) A Medina Garrigues	0	3
Q	(Slovakia) AK Schmiedlová	3	2
6	(United States) M Keys	6	6
3	(Australia) S Stosur	6	6
(Sweden) J Larsson	4	2
(United States) L Davis	3	5
Q	(Switzerland) B Bencic	6	7
(Japan) M Doi	6	6
(Spain) S Soler Espinosa	1	2
(Japan) K Date-Krumm	6	6
7/WC	(United Kingdom) L Robson	4	4

Second round
9	(France) K Mladenovic	7^{7}	2	0
(China) J Zheng	6^{5}	6	6
(China) S Zhang	4	0
6	(United States) M Keys	6	6
3	(Australia) S Stosur	6	6
Q	(Switzerland) B Bencic	4	2
(Japan) M Doi	7^{7}	6
(Japan) K Date-Krumm	6^{3}	4

Quarterfinals
(China) J Zheng	3	1
6	(United States) M Keys	6	6
3	(Australia) S Stosur	6	3	6
(Japan) M Doi	1	6	3

Semifinals
6	(United States) M Keys	1	2
3	(Australia) S Stosur	6	6

=== Bottom half ===
First round
5	(Canada) E Bouchard	6	6
(United States) V Lepchenko	3	0
Q	(Thailand) L Kumkhum	6	6
(Japan) A Morita	2	1
(Chinese Taipei) S-w Hsieh	2	2
Q	(Czech Republic) B Záhlavová-Strýcová	6	6
LL	(United States) V King	3	7	6
4	(Italy) F Pennetta	6	5	0
8	(Puerto Rico) M Puig	6	6
(United Kingdom) H Watson	4	4
WC	(Japan) K Nara	6	6
(France) C Garcia	3	2
(Slovenia) P Hercog	6	5	6
(Czech Republic) P Cetkovská	4	7	1
(South Africa) C Scheepers	5	6^{1}
2	(Germany) S Lisicki	7	7^{7}

Second round
5	(Canada) E Bouchard	6	6
Q	(Thailand) L Kumkhum	2	2
Q	(Czech Republic) B Záhlavová-Strýcová	2	6	6
LL	(United States) V King	6	3	1
8	(Puerto Rico) M Puig	5	6^{4}
WC	(Japan) K Nara	7	7^{7}
(Slovenia) P Hercog	w/o
2	(Germany) S Lisicki

Quarterfinals
5	(Canada) E Bouchard	2	6	6
Q	(Czech Republic) B Záhlavová-Strýcová	6	4	1
WC	(Japan) K Nara	7^{7}	2	6
(Slovenia) P Hercog	6^{4}	6	1

Semifinals
5	(Canada) E Bouchard	6	6
WC	(Japan) K Nara	2	2

== Qualifying ==
=== Seeds ===
1. (Slovakia) Anna Karolína Schmiedlová (qualified)
2. (United States) Vania King (qualifying competition, lucky loser)
3. (Czech Republic) Barbora Záhlavová-Strýcová (qualified)
4. (Luxembourg) Mandy Minella (second round)
5. (Thailand) Luksika Kumkhum (qualified)
6. (China) Duan Yingying (first round)
7. (Australia) Anastasia Rodionova (qualifying competition, retired)
8. (China) Zheng Saisai (first round)

=== Qualifiers ===
1. (Slovakia) Anna Karolína Schmiedlová
2. (Thailand) Luksika Kumkhum
3. (Czech Republic) Barbora Záhlavová-Strýcová
4. (Switzerland) Belinda Bencic

=== Lucky losers ===
1. (United States) Vania King

=== Draw ===
==== First qualifier ====
First round
1	(Slovakia) Anna Karolína Schmiedlová	6	6
WC	(Japan) Akiko Omae	3	2
(Japan) Risa Ozaki	6	6
(Thailand) Varatchaya Wongteanchai	3	2
(China) Yang Zi	6^{5}	3
(Japan) Chiaki Okadaue	7^{7}	6
(Japan) Eri Hozumi	7^{7}	6
8	(China) Zheng Saisai	6^{3}	3

Second round
1	(Slovakia) Anna Karolína Schmiedlová	1	6	6
(Japan) Risa Ozaki	6	0	1
(Japan) Chiaki Okadaue	2	2
(Japan) Eri Hozumi	6	6

Qualifying competition
1	(Slovakia) Anna Karolína Schmiedlová	6	6
(Japan) Eri Hozumi	1	2

==== Second qualifier ====
First round
2	(United States) Vania King	6	6
(Japan) Miharu Imanishi	0	0
(Japan) Yuka Higuchi	6	7
(Thailand) Nudnida Luangnam	4	5
(Japan) Shuko Aoyama	0	6	6
(Thailand) Peangtarn Plipuech	6	4	0
WC	(Japan) Ayaka Okuno	6^{6}	0
5	(Thailand) Luksika Kumkhum	7^{8}	6

Second round
2	(United States) Vania King	6	6
(Japan) Yuka Higuchi	0	3
(Japan) Shuko Aoyama	5	2
5	(Thailand) Luksika Kumkhum	7	6

Qualifying competition
2	(United States) Vania King	3	5
5	(Thailand) Luksika Kumkhum	6	7

==== Third qualifier ====
First round
3	(Czech Republic) Barbora Záhlavová-Strýcová	6	6
WC	(Japan) Makoto Ninomiya	0	0
(Georgia (country)) Sofia Shapatava	2	2
(China) Wang Qiang	6	6
(Japan) Miki Miyamura	4	5
(Japan) Nao Hibino	6	7
(Kazakhstan) Zarina Diyas	6	6^{4}	6
6	(China) Duan Yingying	3	7^{7}	4

Second round
3	(Czech Republic) Barbora Záhlavová-Strýcová	7^{7}	6
(China) Wang Qiang	6^{2}	2
(Japan) Nao Hibino	2	1
(Kazakhstan) Zarina Diyas	6	6

Qualifying competition
3	(Czech Republic) Barbora Záhlavová-Strýcová	6	6
(Kazakhstan) Zarina Diyas	3	2

==== Fourth qualifier ====
First round
4	(Luxembourg) Mandy Minella	6	6
(Japan) Misa Eguchi	4	2
(Switzerland) Belinda Bencic	6	6
(Chinese Taipei) Chang Kai-chen	2	2
(Netherlands) Richèl Hogenkamp	6	7^{7}
(Japan) Junri Namigata	0	6^{5}
WC	(Japan) Natsumi Chimura	2	0
7	(Australia) Anastasia Rodionova	6	6

Second round
4	(Luxembourg) Mandy Minella	3	2
(Switzerland) Belinda Bencic	6	6
(Netherlands) Richèl Hogenkamp	2	6^{5}
7	(Australia) Anastasia Rodionova	6	7^{7}

Qualifying competition
(Switzerland) Belinda Bencic	5	6	5
7	(Australia) Anastasia Rodionova	7	2	0r
