= 2013 HP Open – Doubles =

Doubles
- 2013 HP Open

Final
- Champions: (France) Kristina Mladenovic (Italy) Flavia Pennetta
- Runners-up: (Australia) Samantha Stosur (China) Zhang Shuai
- Score: 6-4, 6-3

Events
Singles	Doubles
← 2012 ·	HP Open	· 2014 →

Raquel Kops-Jones and Abigail Spears were the defending champions, but lost in the semifinals to Samantha Stosur and Zhang Shuai.
Kristina Mladenovic and Flavia Pennetta won the title, defeating Samantha Stosur and Zhang Shuai in the final, 6–4, 6–3.

== Seeds ==
1. (United States) Raquel Kops-Jones / (United States) Abigail Spears (semifinals)
2. (France) Kristina Mladenovic / (Italy) Flavia Pennetta (champions)
3. (United States) Varvara Lepchenko / (China) Zheng Saisai (quarterfinals, withdrew)
4. (Spain) Anabel Medina Garrigues / (Spain) Sílvia Soler Espinosa (first round)

== Draw ==
=== Key ===
- Q = Qualifier
- WC = Wild card
- LL = Lucky loser
- Alt = Alternate
- SE = Special exempt
- PR = Protected ranking
- ITF = ITF entry
- JE = Junior exempt
- w/o = Walkover
- r = Retired
- d = Defaulted
- SR = Special ranking

=== Draw ===
First round
1	(United States) R Kops-Jones (United States) A Spears	6	6
(Japan) K Date-Krumm (South Africa) C Scheepers	3	4
(Slovenia) P Hercog (United States) L Raymond	6	2	[11]
(Canada) S Fichman (United Kingdom) H Watson	2	6	[9]
4	(Spain) A Medina Garrigues (Spain) S Soler Espinosa	3	1
(Australia) S Stosur (China) S Zhang	6	6
(Croatia) D Jurak (Luxembourg) M Minella	6	7^{7}
(Canada) E Bouchard (France) C Garcia	2	6^{4}
WC	(Japan) M Doi (Japan) M Miyamura	7^{6}	6
(Sweden) J Larsson (United States) M Moulton-Levy	6^{5}	2
WC	(Japan) K Nara (Japan) R Ozaki	7^{7}	2	[5]
3	(United States) V Lepchenko (China) S Zheng	6^{2}	6	[10]
(Japan) S Aoyama (Chinese Taipei) K-c Chang	2	3
(Chinese Taipei) S-y Hsieh (Chinese Taipei) S-w Hsieh	6	6
(Czech Republic) P Cetkovská (China) J Zheng	4	2
2	(France) K Mladenovic (Italy) F Pennetta	6	6

Quarterfinals
1	(United States) R Kops-Jones (United States) A Spears	w/o
(Slovenia) P Hercog (United States) L Raymond
(Australia) S Stosur (China) S Zhang	6	7^{8}
(Croatia) D Jurak (Luxembourg) M Minella	0	6^{6}
WC	(Japan) M Doi (Japan) M Miyamura	w/o
3	(United States) V Lepchenko (China) S Zheng
(Chinese Taipei) S-y Hsieh (Chinese Taipei) S-w Hsieh	2	2
2	(France) K Mladenovic (Italy) F Pennetta	6	6

Semifinals
1	(United States) R Kops-Jones (United States) A Spears	7^{8}	3	[5]
(Australia) S Stosur (China) S Zhang	6^{6}	6	[10]
WC	(Japan) M Doi (Japan) M Miyamura	2	4
2	(France) K Mladenovic (Italy) F Pennetta	6	6

Final
(Australia) S Stosur (China) S Zhang	4	3
2	(France) K Mladenovic (Italy) F Pennetta	6	6
