= 2017 Japan Women's Open – Doubles =

Doubles
- 2017 Japan Women's Open

Final
- Champions: (Japan) Shuko Aoyama (China) Yang Zhaoxuan
- Runners-up: (Australia) Monique Adamczak (Australia) Storm Sanders
- Score: 6–0, 2–6, [10–5]

Details
- Draw: 16
- Seeds: 4

Events
Singles	Doubles
← 2016 ·	Japan Women's Open	· 2018 →

Shuko Aoyama and Makoto Ninomiya were the defending champions, but chose not to compete together. Aoyama played alongside Yang Zhaoxuan, and successfully defended her title, defeating Monique Adamczak and Storm Sanders in the final 6–0, 2–6, [10–5]. Ninomiya teamed up with Renata Voráčová, but lost to Aoyama and Yang in the semifinals.

== Seeds ==
1. (Japan) Makoto Ninomiya / (Czech Republic) Renata Voráčová (semifinals)
2. (Japan) Eri Hozumi / (Japan) Miyu Kato (quarterfinals)
3. (Ukraine) Lyudmyla Kichenok / (Slovenia) Katarina Srebotnik (first round)
4. (Japan) Shuko Aoyama / (China) Yang Zhaoxuan (champions)

== Draw ==
Key

- Q = Qualifier
- WC = Wild card
- LL = Lucky loser
- Alt = Alternate
- ITF = ITF entry
- PR = Protected ranking
- SR = Special ranking
- SE = Special exempt
- JE = Junior exempt
- JR = Junior Accelerator Programme entrant
- CO = College Accelerator Programme entrant
- NG = Next Gen Accelerator Program entrant
- w/o = Walkover
- r = Retired
- d = Defaulted

=== Draw ===
First round
1	(Japan) M Ninomiya (Czech Republic) R Voráčová	1	7^{7}	[11]
WC	(Chinese Taipei) C-j Chuang (Japan) M Doi	6	6^{4}	[9]
(United States) N Melichar (United Kingdom) A Smith	6	3	[8]
(Japan) N Hibino (Australia) J Moore	4	6	[10]
4	(Japan) S Aoyama (China) Z Yang	6	6
(Croatia) D Jurak (United States) C McHale	3	4
(China) X Han (Japan) A Omae	6	4	[8]
(China) C Liang (Australia) Ar Rodionova	0	6	[10]
(Ukraine) K Bondarenko (Serbia) A Krunić	6	6
(Czech Republic) Kr Plíšková (Ukraine) O Savchuk	3	4
(Belgium) E Mertens (Turkey) İ Soylu	7^{7}	6
3	(Ukraine) L Kichenok (Slovenia) K Srebotnik	6^{5}	3
WC	(Japan) E Hayashi (Japan) M Kobori	2	0
(Australia) M Adamczak (Australia) S Sanders	6	6
(Kazakhstan) Z Diyas (China) Y Xu	0	2
2	(Japan) E Hozumi (Japan) M Kato	6	6

Quarterfinals
1	(Japan) M Ninomiya (Czech Republic) R Voráčová	6	4	[11]
(Japan) N Hibino (Australia) J Moore	3	6	[9]
4	(Japan) S Aoyama (China) Z Yang	6^{4}	7^{7}	[10]
(China) C Liang (Australia) Ar Rodionova	7^{7}	6^{5}	[8]
(Ukraine) K Bondarenko (Serbia) A Krunić	4	7^{7}	[5]
(Belgium) E Mertens (Turkey) İ Soylu	6	6^{3}	[10]
(Australia) M Adamczak (Australia) S Sanders	6	6
2	(Japan) E Hozumi (Japan) M Kato	4	2

Semifinals
1	(Japan) M Ninomiya (Czech Republic) R Voráčová	4	3
4	(Japan) S Aoyama (China) Z Yang	6	6
(Belgium) E Mertens (Turkey) İ Soylu	3	6	[5]
(Australia) M Adamczak (Australia) S Sanders	6	4	[10]

Final
4	(Japan) S Aoyama (China) Z Yang	6	2	[10]
(Australia) M Adamczak (Australia) S Sanders	0	6	[5]
