= 2016 Japan Women's Open – Doubles =

Doubles
- 2016 Japan Women's Open

Final
- Champions: (Japan) Shuko Aoyama (Japan) Makoto Ninomiya
- Runners-up: (United Kingdom) Jocelyn Rae (United Kingdom) Anna Smith
- Score: 6–3, 6–3

Details
- Draw: 16
- Seeds: 4

Events
Singles	Doubles
← 2015 ·	Japan Women's Open	· 2017 →

Chan Hao-ching and Chan Yung-jan were the defending champions, but decided not to participate this year.
Shuko Aoyama and Makoto Ninomiya won the title, defeating Jocelyn Rae and Anna Smith in the final, 6–3, 6–3.

== Seeds ==
1. (China) Xu Yifan / (China) Zheng Saisai (first round)
2. (Ukraine) Kateryna Bondarenko / (Chinese Taipei) Chuang Chia-jung (first round)
3. (Serbia) Aleksandra Krunić / (Czech Republic) Kateřina Siniaková (semifinals)
4. (China) Liang Chen / (China) Yang Zhaoxuan (first round)

== Draw ==
Key

- Q = Qualifier
- WC = Wild card
- LL = Lucky loser
- Alt = Alternate
- ITF = ITF entry
- PR = Protected ranking
- SR = Special ranking
- SE = Special exempt
- JE = Junior exempt
- JR = Junior Accelerator Programme entrant
- CO = College Accelerator Programme entrant
- NG = Next Gen Accelerator Program entrant
- w/o = Walkover
- r = Retired
- d = Defaulted

First round
1	(China) Y Xu (China) S Zheng	4	5
(Japan) S Aoyama (Japan) M Ninomiya	6	7
(Japan) M Doi (Japan) K Nara	5	6	[4]
(Netherlands) D Schuurs (Czech Republic) R Voráčová	7	4	[10]
3	(Serbia) A Krunić (Czech Republic) K Siniaková	3	6	[10]
(United States) N Melichar (Thailand) V Wongteanchai	6	2	[3]
(Japan) N Hibino (Poland) A Rosolska	2	6	[7]
(Australia) Ar Rodionova (Ukraine) O Savchuk	6	4	[10]
(Israel) J Glushko (Sweden) J Larsson	6	6
WC	(Japan) K Hisami (Japan) K Takahata	4	1
(United Kingdom) J Rae (United Kingdom) A Smith	6	6
4	(China) C Liang (China) Z Yang	1	1
WC	(Slovakia) D Hantuchová (United States) A Riske	7	3	[10]
(United States) C McHale (Australia) J Moore	5	6	[6]
(Japan) E Hozumi (Japan) M Kato	6	6
2	(Ukraine) K Bondarenko (Chinese Taipei) C-j Chuang	2	4

Quarterfinals
(Japan) S Aoyama (Japan) M Ninomiya	7	6
(Netherlands) D Schuurs (Czech Republic) R Voráčová	5	3
3	(Serbia) A Krunić (Czech Republic) K Siniaková	2	6	[10]
(Australia) Ar Rodionova (Ukraine) O Savchuk	6	1	[4]
(Israel) J Glushko (Sweden) J Larsson	5	1
(United Kingdom) J Rae (United Kingdom) A Smith	7	6
WC	(Slovakia) D Hantuchová (United States) A Riske	0	4
(Japan) E Hozumi (Japan) M Kato	6	6

Semifinals
(Japan) S Aoyama (Japan) M Ninomiya	6	5	[10]
3	(Serbia) A Krunić (Czech Republic) K Siniaková	4	7	[4]
(United Kingdom) J Rae (United Kingdom) A Smith	6	6
(Japan) E Hozumi (Japan) M Kato	1	2

Final
(Japan) S Aoyama (Japan) M Ninomiya	6	6
(United Kingdom) J Rae (United Kingdom) A Smith	3	3
