= 2017 Japan Women's Open – Singles =

Singles
- 2017 Japan Women's Open

Final
- Champion: (Kazakhstan) Zarina Diyas
- Runner-up: (Japan) Miyu Kato
- Score: 6–2, 7–5

Details
- Draw: 32
- Seeds: 8

Events
Singles	Doubles
- Japan Women's Open

Christina McHale was the defending champion, but lost in the semifinals to Zarina Diyas.

Qualifier Diyas went on to win her first WTA title, defeating another qualifier Miyu Kato in the final, 6–2, 7–5.

Former world no. 4 Kimiko Date played her last professional match at this tournament, losing in straight sets to Aleksandra Krunić in the first round.

== Seeds ==
1. (France) Kristina Mladenovic (first round)
2. (China) Zhang Shuai (second round)
3. (Belgium) Elise Mertens (quarterfinals)
4. (Czech Republic) Kristýna Plíšková (second round)
5. (Australia) Samantha Stosur (first round)
6. (Japan) Naomi Osaka (first round)
7. (United States) Alison Riske (second round)
8. (Kazakhstan) Yulia Putintseva (quarterfinals)

== Draw ==
Key

- Q = Qualifier
- WC = Wild card
- LL = Lucky loser
- Alt = Alternate
- ITF = ITF entry
- PR = Protected ranking
- SR = Special ranking
- SE = Special exempt
- JE = Junior exempt
- JR = Junior Accelerator Programme entrant
- CO = College Accelerator Programme entrant
- NG = Next Gen Accelerator Program entrant
- w/o = Walkover
- r = Retired
- d = Defaulted

=== Finals ===
Semifinals
Q	(Croatia) Jana Fett	6	6^{1}	4
Q	(Japan) Miyu Kato	4	7^{7}	6
(United States) Christina McHale	4	6	3
Q	(Kazakhstan) Zarina Diyas	6	0	6

Final
Q	(Japan) Miyu Kato	2	5
Q	(Kazakhstan) Zarina Diyas	6	7

=== Top half ===
First round
1/WC	(France) K Mladenovic	3	4
Q	(Croatia) J Fett	6	6
(Belarus) A Sasnovich	3	0^{r}
(Slovakia) J Čepelová	6	1
(Chinese Taipei) S-w Hsieh	5	2
(China) Q Wang	7	6
(Japan) K Nara	6	6
6	(Japan) N Osaka	3	0
4/WC	(Czech Republic) Kr Plíšková	7	7
(Chinese Taipei) K-c Chang	5	5
Q	(Japan) M Kato	6	6
(Japan) N Hibino	3	4
(Serbia) A Krunić	6	6
WC	(Japan) K Date	0	0
(United States) M Brengle	7	3	4
7	(United States) A Riske	5	6	6

Second round
Q	(Croatia) J Fett	6	6
(Slovakia) J Čepelová	0	3
(China) Q Wang	6	6
(Japan) K Nara	2	3
4/WC	(Czech Republic) Kr Plíšková	5	3
Q	(Japan) M Kato	7	6
(Serbia) A Krunić	6	6
7	(United States) A Riske	3	4

Quarterfinals
Q	(Croatia) J Fett	6	4	6
(China) Q Wang	3	6	3
Q	(Japan) M Kato	6	6
(Serbia) A Krunić	1	3

Semifinals
Q	(Croatia) J Fett	6	6^{1}	4
Q	(Japan) M Kato	4	7^{7}	6

=== Bottom half ===
First round
5	(Australia) S Stosur	6	5	1
(Spain) S Sorribes Tormo	3	7	6
(United States) C McHale	6	6
Q	(Montenegro) D Kovinić	2	4
(Japan) R Ozaki	1	5
(Poland) M Linette	6	7
(Russia) E Rodina	6^{6}	1
3	(Belgium) E Mertens	7^{8}	6
8	(Kazakhstan) Y Putintseva	6	4	6
(China) Y Duan	4	6	4
PR	(Japan) M Eguchi	5	2
(China) X Han	7	6
Q	(Kazakhstan) Z Diyas	3	6	6
(Japan) M Doi	6	1	1
(Netherlands) R Hogenkamp	3	3
2	(China) S Zhang	6	6

Second round
(Spain) S Sorribes Tormo	1	1
(United States) C McHale	6	6
(Poland) M Linette	1	5
3	(Belgium) E Mertens	6	7
8	(Kazakhstan) Y Putintseva	6	2
(China) X Han	2	0^{r}
Q	(Kazakhstan) Z Diyas	6	6
2	(China) S Zhang	4	2

Quarterfinals
(United States) C McHale	6	6
3	(Belgium) E Mertens	4	1
8	(Kazakhstan) Y Putintseva	6	1	3
Q	(Kazakhstan) Z Diyas	4	6	6

Semifinals
(United States) C McHale	4	6	3
Q	(Kazakhstan) Z Diyas	6	0	6

== Qualifying ==
=== Seeds ===
1. (Montenegro) Danka Kovinić (qualified)
2. (Kazakhstan) Zarina Diyas (qualified)
3. (United States) Kristie Ahn (first round)
4. (Croatia) Jana Fett (qualified)
5. (Australia) Arina Rodionova (second round)
6. (South Korea) Jang Su-jeong (second round)
7. (Netherlands) Arantxa Rus (first round)
8. (Netherlands) Quirine Lemoine (second round)

=== Qualifiers ===
1. (Montenegro) Danka Kovinić
2. (Kazakhstan) Zarina Diyas
3. (Japan) Miyu Kato
4. (Croatia) Jana Fett

=== Qualifying draw ===
==== First qualifier ====
First round
1	(Montenegro) Danka Kovinić	3	6	6
(United States) Jennifer Elie	6	4	3
WC	(Japan) Moyuka Uchijima	6	4	2
Alt	(Japan) Erika Sema	3	6	6
(Turkey) İpek Soylu	2	1
(Japan) Miharu Imanishi	6	6
(Australia) Lizette Cabrera	6	4	6
7	(Netherlands) Arantxa Rus	2	6	3

Second round
1	(Montenegro) Danka Kovinić	2	6	6
Alt	(Japan) Erika Sema	6	3	2
(Japan) Miharu Imanishi	2	6	6
(Australia) Lizette Cabrera	6	4	0

Qualifying competition
1	(Montenegro) Danka Kovinić	6	3	6
(Japan) Miharu Imanishi	3	6	2

==== Second qualifier ====
First round
2	(Kazakhstan) Zarina Diyas	6	6
(United States) Danielle Collins	3	2
(Japan) Ayano Shimizu	2	4
(Italy) Giulia Gatto-Monticone	6	6
(Japan) Mayo Hibi	2	6	4
(Thailand) Luksika Kumkhum	6	3	6
WC	(Japan) Himari Satō	1	2
6	(South Korea) Jang Su-jeong	6	6

Second round
2	(Kazakhstan) Zarina Diyas	6	6
(Italy) Giulia Gatto-Monticone	3	2
(Thailand) Luksika Kumkhum	6	6
6	(South Korea) Jang Su-jeong	4	4

Qualifying competition
2	(Kazakhstan) Zarina Diyas	1	7^{7}	6
(Thailand) Luksika Kumkhum	6	6^{4}	4

==== Third qualifier ====
First round
3	(United States) Kristie Ahn	6^{1}	6	4
(Japan) Miyu Kato	7^{7}	4	6
(Turkey) Başak Eraydın	4	7^{7}	6
(Japan) Riko Sawayanagi	6	6^{4}	3
(Sweden) Rebecca Peterson	6	5	2
(Poland) Magdalena Fręch	3	7	6
WC	(Japan) Mari Osaka	6	4	4
5	(Australia) Arina Rodionova	4	6	6

Second round
(Japan) Miyu Kato	6	6
(Turkey) Başak Eraydın	3	0
(Poland) Magdalena Fręch	4	7^{7}	6
5	(Australia) Arina Rodionova	6	6^{3}	1

Qualifying competition
(Japan) Miyu Kato	6	2	7^{7}
(Poland) Magdalena Fręch	3	6	6^{3}

==== Fourth qualifier ====
First round
4	(Croatia) Jana Fett	6	6
(Japan) Eri Hozumi	2	2
(Japan) Hiroko Kuwata	4	2
(Czech Republic) Karolína Muchová	6	6
(Japan) Junri Namigata	2	1
(Netherlands) Lesley Kerkhove	6	6
(Thailand) Peangtarn Plipuech	1	5
8	(Netherlands) Quirine Lemoine	6	7

Second round
4	(Croatia) Jana Fett	6	4	6
(Czech Republic) Karolína Muchová	1	6	4
(Netherlands) Lesley Kerkhove	6	7
8	(Netherlands) Quirine Lemoine	3	5

Qualifying competition
4	(Croatia) Jana Fett	6	6
(Netherlands) Lesley Kerkhove	4	0
