= Japan Women's Open =

Kinoshita Group Japan Open
- 2026 Japan Women's Open
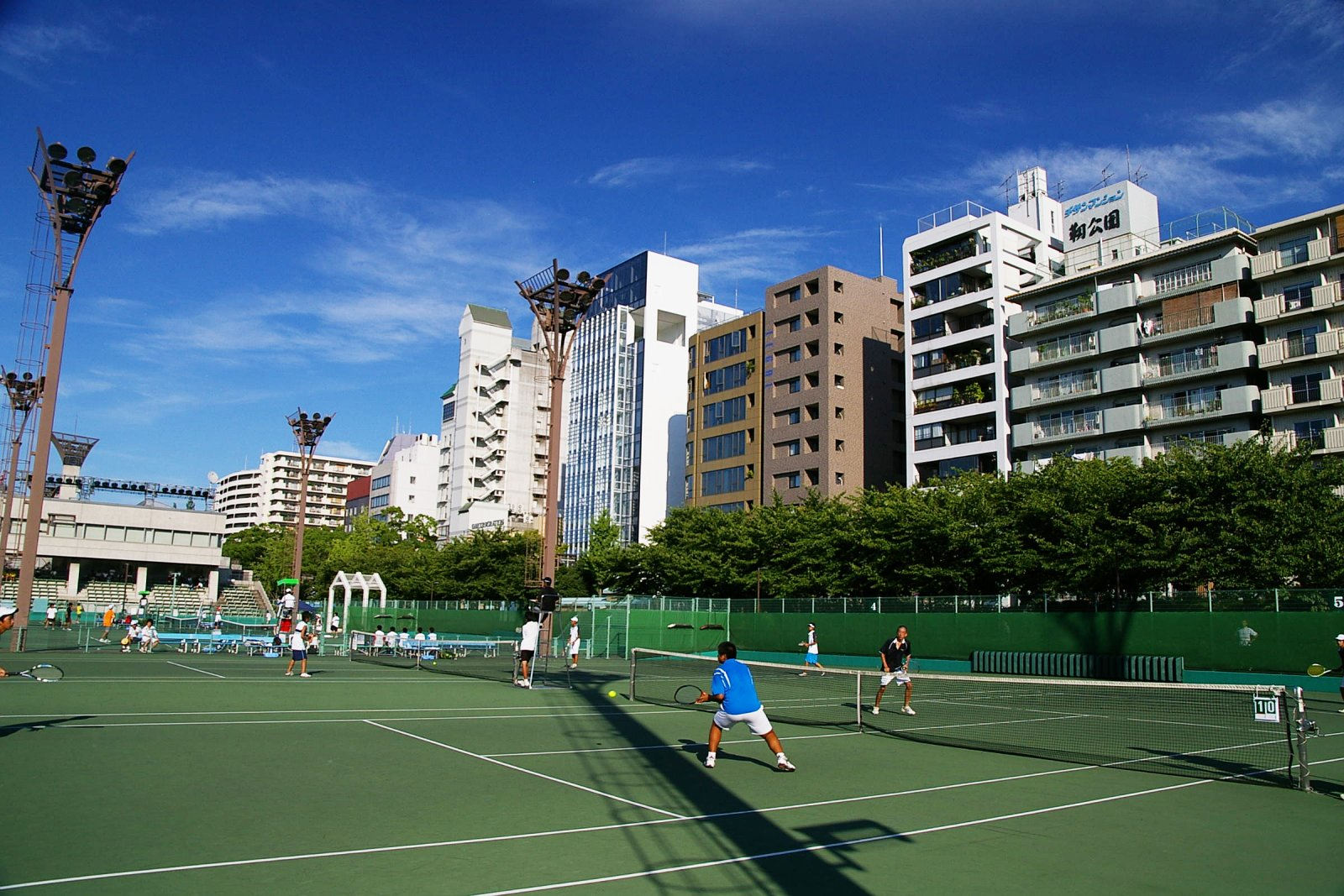

WTA Tour
- Founded: 2009
- Editions: 15 (2026)
- Location: Osaka (2009–2014, 2023-); Tokyo (2015–2017); Hiroshima (2018–2019); Japan
- Venue: Utsubo Tennis Center (2009-2014, 2023-); Ariake Tennis Forest Park (2015-2017); Regional Park Tennis Stadium (2018-2019)
- Surface: Hard / outdoors
- Website: japanopentennis.com/wta

Current champions (2026)
- Singles: (Czech Republic) Kateřina Siniaková
- Doubles: (Australia) Storm Hunter (Indonesia) Janice Tjen
WTA Tour
- Category: International (2009-2019); WTA 250 (2023–current)
- Draw: 32S / 24Q / 16D
- Prize money: US$283,347 (2026)

The Kinoshita Group Japan Open Tennis Championships (Japanese: ジャパン女子オープンテニス), currently sponsored by the Kinoshita Group (formerly HP Open), is a professional tennis tournament played annually on outdoor hardcourts in Osaka, Japan. It is a WTA 250 event on the WTA Tour.

As successor to the Japan Open (where men and women played simultaneously, up to 2008) the event was held in women-only format for the first time in 2009, and was the second tournament of the season held in Japan: the Pan Pacific Open, a Premier 5 tournament, was held two weeks before. In 2015, the event was moved from Osaka to Tokyo and in 2018 to Hiroshima, before returning to Osaka in 2023 after a three-year hiatus.

== Past finals ==
=== Singles ===
Location	Year	Champion	Runner-up	Score
Osaka	2026	(Czech Republic) Kateřina Siniaková	(United States) Ashlyn Krueger	6–1, 6–0
Osaka	2025	(Canada) Leylah Fernandez	(Czech Republic) Tereza Valentová	6–0, 5–7, 6–3
Osaka	2024	(Netherlands) Suzan Lamens	(Australia) Kimberly Birrell	6–3, 6–3
Osaka	2023	(United States) Ashlyn Krueger	(China) Zhu Lin	6–3, 7–6^{(8–6)}
	2022	no competition (due to financial crisis)		
	2021	no competition (due to COVID-19 pandemic)		
	2020	no competition (due to COVID-19 pandemic)		
Hiroshima	2019	(Japan) Nao Hibino	(Japan) Misaki Doi	6–3, 6–2
Hiroshima	2018	(Chinese Taipei) Hsieh Su-wei	(United States) Amanda Anisimova	6–2, 6–2
Tokyo	2017	(Kazakhstan) Zarina Diyas	(Japan) Miyu Kato	6–2, 7–5
Tokyo	2016	(United States) Christina McHale	(Czech Republic) Kateřina Siniaková	3–6, 6–4, 6–4
Tokyo	2015	(Belgium) Yanina Wickmayer	(Poland) Magda Linette	4–6, 6–3, 6–3
Osaka	2014	(Australia) Samantha Stosur (3)	(Kazakhstan) Zarina Diyas	7–6^{(9–7)}, 6–3
Osaka	2013	(Australia) Samantha Stosur (2)	(Canada) Eugenie Bouchard	3–6, 7–5, 6–2
Osaka	2012	(United Kingdom) Heather Watson	(Chinese Taipei) Chang Kai-chen	7–5, 5–7, 7–6^{(7–4)}
Osaka	2011	(France) Marion Bartoli	(Australia) Samantha Stosur	6–3, 6–1
Osaka	2010	(Thailand) Tamarine Tanasugarn	(Japan) Kimiko Date-Krumm	7–5, 6–7^{(7–4)}, 6–1
Osaka	2009	(Australia) Samantha Stosur	(Italy) Francesca Schiavone	7–5, 6–1

=== Doubles ===
Location	Year	Champions	Runners-up	Score
Osaka	2026	(Australia) Storm Hunter (Indonesia) Janice Tjen	(Czech Republic) Jesika Malečková (Czech Republic) Miriam Škoch	6–4, 6–1
Osaka	2025	(France) Kristina Mladenovic (2) (United States) Taylor Townsend	(Australia) Storm Hunter (United States) Desirae Krawczyk	6–4, 2–6, [10–5]
Osaka	2024	(Japan) Ena Shibahara (Germany) Laura Siegemund	(Spain) Cristina Bucșa (Romania) Monica Niculescu	3–6, 6–2, [10–2]
Osaka	2023	(Germany) Anna-Lena Friedsam (Ukraine) Nadiia Kichenok	Anna Kalinskaya (Kazakhstan) Yulia Putintseva	7–6^{(7–3)}, 6–3
	2022	no competition (due to financial crisis)		
	2021	no competition (due to COVID-19 pandemic)		
	2020	no competition (due to COVID-19 pandemic)		
Hiroshima	2019	(Japan) Misaki Doi (Japan) Nao Hibino	(United States) Christina McHale (Russia) Valeria Savinykh	3–6, 6–4, [10–4]
Hiroshima	2018	(Japan) Eri Hozumi (China) Zhang Shuai (2)	(Japan) Miyu Kato (Japan) Makoto Ninomiya	6–2, 6–4
Tokyo	2017	(Japan) Shuko Aoyama (3) (China) Yang Zhaoxuan	(Australia) Monique Adamczak (Australia) Storm Sanders	6–0, 2–6, [10–5]
Tokyo	2016	(Japan) Shuko Aoyama (2) (Japan) Makoto Ninomiya	(United Kingdom) Jocelyn Rae (United Kingdom) Anna Smith	6–3, 6–3
Tokyo	2015	(Chinese Taipei) Chan Hao-ching (Chinese Taipei) Chan Yung-jan	(Japan) Misaki Doi (Japan) Kurumi Nara	6–1, 6–2
Osaka	2014	(Japan) Shuko Aoyama (Czech Republic) Renata Voráčová	(Spain) Lara Arruabarrena (Germany) Tatjana Maria	6–1, 6–2
Osaka	2013	(France) Kristina Mladenovic (Italy) Flavia Pennetta	(Australia) Samantha Stosur (China) Zhang Shuai	6–4, 6–3
Osaka	2012	(United States) Raquel Kops-Jones (United States) Abigail Spears	(Japan) Kimiko Date-Krumm (United Kingdom) Heather Watson	6–1, 6–4
Osaka	2011	(Japan) Kimiko Date-Krumm (China) Zhang Shuai	(United States) Vania King (Kazakhstan) Yaroslava Shvedova	7–5, 3–6, [11–9]
Osaka	2010	(Chinese Taipei) Chang Kai-chen (United States) Lilia Osterloh	(Japan) Shuko Aoyama (Japan) Rika Fujiwara	6–0, 6–3
Osaka	2009	(Chinese Taipei) Chuang Chia-jung (United States) Lisa Raymond	(South Africa) Chanelle Scheepers (United States) Abigail Spears	6–2, 6–4

== See also ==
- Japan Open
- Pan Pacific Open
