= Shuko Aoyama =

Japanese tennis player (born 1987)

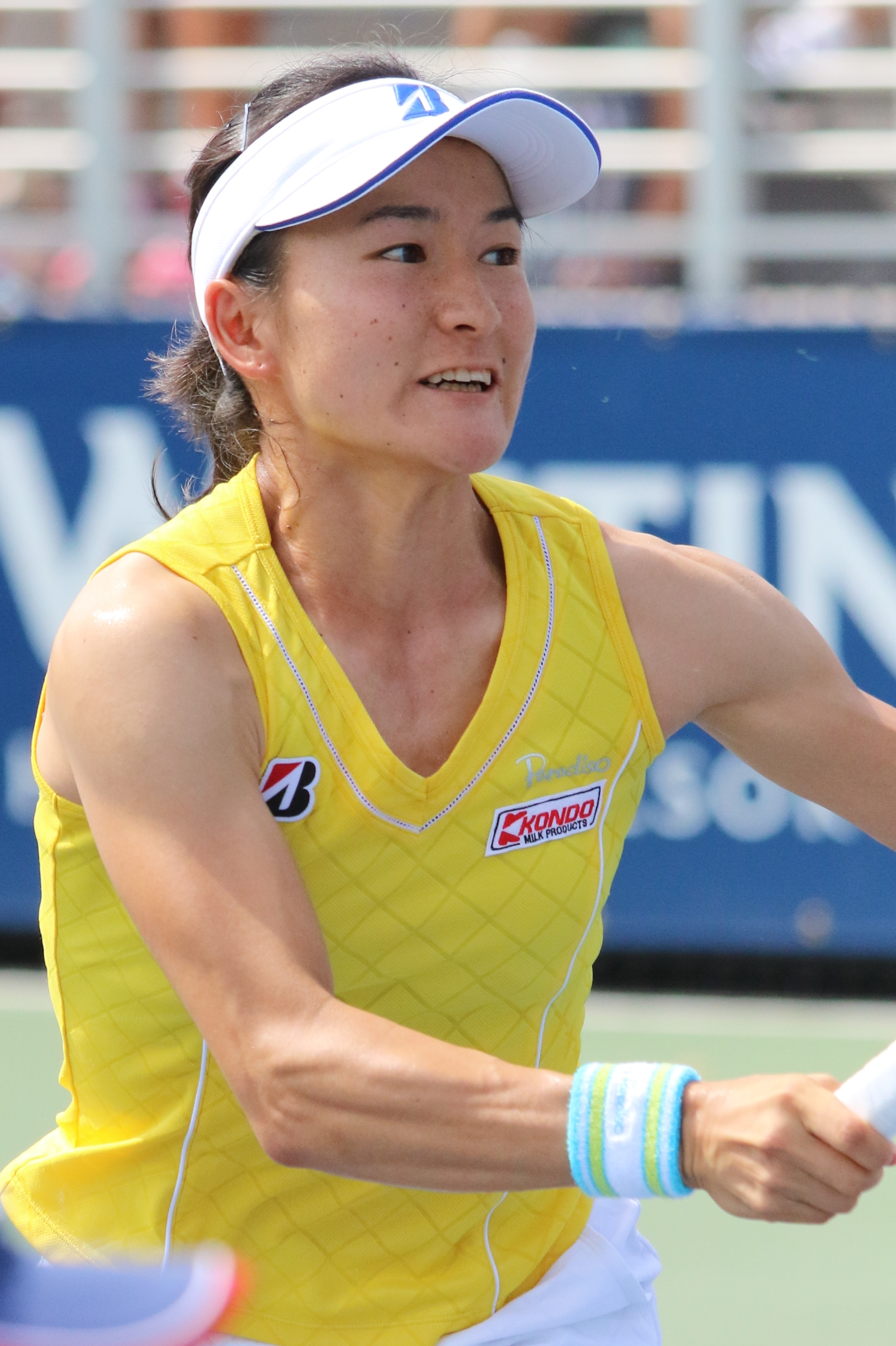
- Aoyama at the 2016 US Open
- Country (sports): Japan
- Born: 19 December 1987 (age 38) Osaka, Japan
- Height: 1.54 m (5 ft 1 in)
- Turned pro: 2007
- Plays: Right (two-handed both sides)
- Coach: Masayaki Ando
- Prize money: $3,158,251

Singles
- Career record: 230–199
- Career titles: 0
- Highest ranking: No. 182 (9 February 2015)

Grand Slam singles results
- Australian Open: Q1 (2015)
- French Open: Q1 (2015)
- US Open: Q2 (2016)

Doubles
- Career record: 552–370
- Career titles: 21
- Highest ranking: No. 4 (28 February 2022)
- Current ranking: No. 23 (10 August 2026)

Grand Slam doubles results
- Australian Open: F (2023)
- French Open: SF (2026)
- Wimbledon: SF (2013, 2021, 2026)
- US Open: 3R (2017, 2021, 2022, 2025)

Other doubles tournaments
- Tour Finals: SF (2021)
- Olympic Games: 2R (2024)

Grand Slam mixed doubles results
- French Open: 1R (2022, 2024)

Team competitions
- Fed Cup: 27–7
Medal record
Women's tennis
Representing Japan
Asian Games
Silver medal – second place	2026 Aichi–Nagoya	Mixed doubles
Bronze medal – third place	2014 Incheon	Mixed doubles
- Last updated on: 20 August 2026.

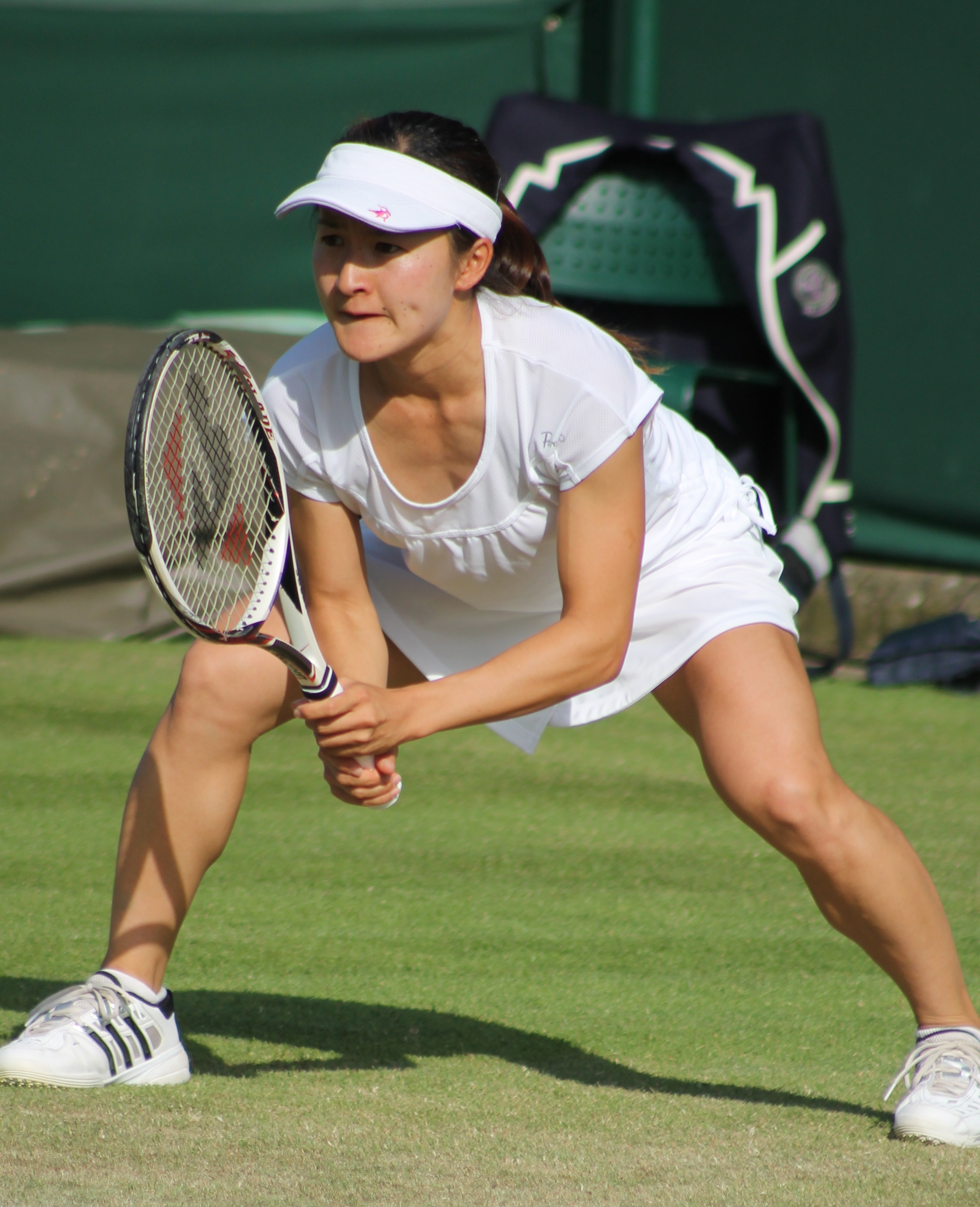
Shuko Aoyama at the 2013 Wimbledon Championships

Shuko Aoyama (青山 修子, Aoyama Shūko; born 19 December 1987) is a Japanese professional tennis player who specializes in doubles. She reached a career-high doubles ranking of world No. 4 on 28 February 2022. Her best doubles results at the majors are the final at the 2023 Australian Open, the semifinals at 2013, 2021 and 2026 Wimbledon Championships and at the 2026 French Open. She also reached the semifinals of the 2021 WTA Finals. She has won 21 titles on the WTA Tour.

Aoyama has also won four singles and 30 doubles titles on the ITF Women's Circuit. Her career-high singles ranking is No. 182, achieved on 9 February 2015.

== Personal life ==
Aoyama started playing tennis at age 9. She studied at Waseda University in Japan and turned professional, after graduating from the university. Her favorite surface in tennis is grass.

== Career ==
=== 2007–12: First steps: WTA Tour title in doubles ===
Aoyama made her ITF Women's Circuit debut in the doubles event at Gifu in 2007. In March 2009, she won her first ITF title at the $10k Kōfu doubles event. In June 2010, she won her first singles ITF title at Tokyo.

In October 2010 at the Japan Women's Open, she made her WTA Tour qualifying singles and main draw doubles debut. She failed to qualify in singles and had more success in doubles, reaching her first WTA Tour final. In late November 2010, she won the $75k Toyota doubles event. In June 2011, she made her WTA Tour singles debut at the Birmingham Classic as a qualifier. At the 2011 Wimbledon Championships, she made her major debut in doubles. At the 2012 Washington Open, she won her first career title in doubles. In September 2012 she won the $100k Ningbo Challenger. During the 2012 season, she also won two $50k events, the Lexington Challenger and the Bronx Open.

=== 2013–17: Wimbledon semifinal, Wuhan final ===
As time passed, Aoyama became mainly a doubles player, playing in doubles events preferentially to singles. She made a strong start into the 2013 season reaching the semifinal in the first week of January at the Shenzhen Open. Soon after, she won her first match in a major at the Australian Open, but then lost in the second round playing with Irina Falconi. In March, she won the Malaysian Open with Chang Kai-chen. She also had a strong start into the grass-court season, reaching the semifinals at the Rosmalen Championships. She achieved more success at Wimbledon, when she and Chanelle Scheepers reached semifinals. This was her first significant major result. In the semifinal match, they lost to Hsieh Su-wei and Peng Shuai. In September, she won the Washington Open for the second year in a row. At the end of the year, she reached semifinals of the Korea Open and won the Toyota World Challenge.

During the next three seasons she did not have as good performances as in the 2013 season. In 2014, in singles, her only significant result came at the end of the year, when she reached the final of the Toyota World Challenge but lost to An-Sophie Mestach. In doubles, she won the Washington Open for the third year in a row. Later in October, she won the Japan Women's Open. During the year, she also had success on the ITF Women's Circuit. In May, she won the $50k Fukuoka International with Eri Hozumi, and later finished as runner-up at both the $50k Lexington Challenger and the $75k Toyota World Challenge. In the first week of the 2015 season, she reached the final at the Auckland Open with Renata Voráčová, they lost to Sara Errani and Roberta Vinci. A month later, she reached the final of the Thailand Open with Tamarine Tanasugarn. She then did not have significant results until September, before she reached semifinals at the Korea Open, and later winning two $100k events, in Nanjing and Tokyo. During 2016, she won one WTA Tour doubles title at the Japan Women's Open, and finished runner-up at the Nuremberg Cup, Washington Open and Jiangxi International Open. She also won three $50k events, in Quanzhou, Shenzhen and Wuhan.

She won her fourth title in Washington D.C. with Renata Voráčová. Later in September, she reached the third round at the US Open with Yang Zhaoxuan, upsetting sixth seeds and Roland Garros finalists Ashleigh Barty and Casey Dellaqua.

=== 2019: New partnership with Shibahara ===
Shuko Aoyama played her first tournament with compatriot Ena Shibahara in August at the Silicon Valley Classic in San Jose, where they reached the final. Shibahara said, "Our chemistry was spot on from the beginning, where I would set her up from the baseline and she just moves all over the net".

Shibahara and Aoyama played five more tournaments together in 2019, winning their first two titles at the Tianjin Open and Kremlin Cup in Moscow.

=== 2020–21: Major & WTA Finals semifinals, Olympics & top 5 debuts ===
Aoyama reached the 2020 French Open quarterfinals, partnering Shibahara. She won her maiden WTA 1000 title at the 2021 Miami Open. The Japanese pair represented Japan at the 2020 Summer Olympics, where they lost in the first round to eventual silver medalists Belinda Bencic and Viktorija Golubic. Aoyama also reached the semifinals at Wimbledon and of the WTA Finals, seeded No. 2. She won four more titles, three being at the WTA 500 level, during 2021 with Shibahara.

=== 2022: World No. 4, Australian Open semifinal ===
Aoyama continued the partnership with Shibihara for the tournaments at the beginning of the year in Australia. At the Australian Open, they improved on their quarterfinal result the previous year by reaching the semifinal. Following this result, Aoyama reached her highest doubles ranking of world No. 4, on 28 February 2022.

For the three other majors during the year Aoyama partnered with Chan Hao-ching, reaching the quarterfinal stage at Wimbledon, and the third round at the US Open, losing to the eventual winners Krejčíková and Siniaková. Her final competition was at the Billie Jean King Cup where Aoyama and Shibahara won each of the six doubles matches they played.

=== 2023: Australian Open finalist, 30th tour final, back to top 10 ===
At the Australian Open, she reached the semifinals of a major for the fourth time in her career, again with Shibahara. The pair defeated second-seeded pair of Americans Coco Gauff and Jessica Pegula in the semifinal to reach their first major final. However, they were defeated in straight sets by defending champions Krejčíková and Siniaková.

She won her 18th title at the Rosmalen Open and the WTA 1000 title at the Canadian Open, partnering Shibahara.

Aoyama returned to the top 10 on 23 October 2023. The pair qualified for the 2023 WTA Finals for the second time with a seeding of No. 3, but lost in the round robin stage.

=== 2024–26: Major semifinals and WTA 250 title, back to top 25 ===
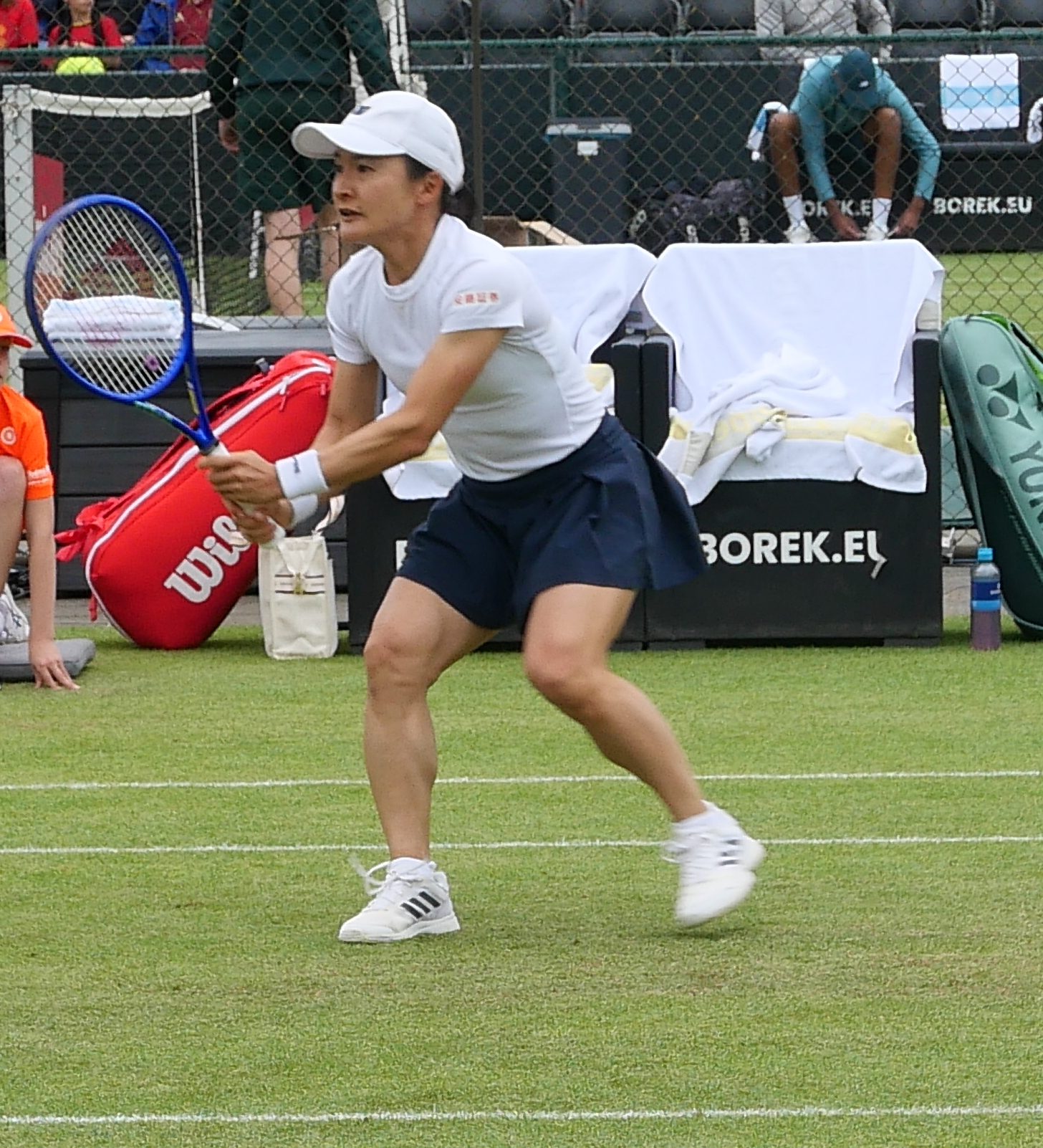
Aoyama at the 2026 Rosmalen Open, where she won the doubles title

Partnering with Eri Hozumi, Aoyama won the doubles title at the 2024 Pan Pacific Open, defeating Ena Shibahara and Laura Siegemund in the final. The pair were runners-up at the Hong Kong Open, losing to Ulrikke Eikeri and Makoto Ninomiya in the final which went to a deciding champions tiebreak.

At the 2026 French Open, partnering Liang En-shuo, she reached the semifinals for the first time, defeating Guo Hanyu and Kristina Mladenovic. Aoyama and Liang then entered the Rosmalen Open, which they went on to win. As a result, she returned the top 30 in the doubles rankings on 15 June 2026.

At the next major in Wimbledon, she again reached the semifinals with Liang defeating nine seeds Ellen Perez and Demi Schuurs.

== Performance timelines ==
Key
W	F	SF	QF	#R	RR	Q#	P#	DNQ	A	Z#	PO	G	S	B	NMS	NTI	P	NH

(W) winner; (F) finalist; (SF) semifinalist; (QF) quarterfinalist; (#R) rounds 4, 3, 2, 1; (RR) round-robin stage; (Q#) qualification round; (P#) preliminary round; (DNQ) did not qualify; (A) absent; (Z#) Davis/Fed Cup Zonal Group (with number indication) or (PO) play-off; (G) gold, (S) silver or (B) bronze Olympic/Paralympic medal; (NMS) not a Masters tournament; (NTI) not a Tier I tournament; (P) postponed; (NH) not held; (SR) strike rate (events won / competed); (W–L) win–loss record.
To avoid confusion and double counting, these charts are updated at the conclusion of a tournament or when the player's participation has ended.

Only main-draw results in WTA Tour, Grand Slam tournaments, Fed Cup/Billie Jean King Cup and Olympic Games are included in win–loss records.

=== Doubles ===
Current through the 2026 Wuhan Open.

Tournament	2010	2011	2012	2013	2014	2015	2016	2017	2018	2019	2020	2021	2022	2023	2024	2025	2026	SR	W–L	Win %
Grand Slam tournaments
Australian Open	A	A	A	2R	1R	1R	1R	1R	3R	2R	3R	QF	SF	F	2R	2R	2R	0 / 14	20–14	59%
French Open	A	A	A	1R	2R	1R	A	1R	1R	1R	QF	2R	1R	2R	1R	2R	SF	0 / 13	11–13	46%
Wimbledon	A	1R	Q2	SF	3R	1R	2R	2R	2R	2R	NH	SF	QF	1R	1R	1R	SF	0 / 14	21–14	60%
US Open	A	1R	A	1R	1R	1R	1R	3R	2R	2R	2R	3R	3R	1R	1R	3R	1R	0 / 15	11–15	42%
Win–Loss	0–0	0–2	0–0	5–4	3–4	0–4	1–3	3–4	4–4	3–4	5–3	10–4	9–4	6–4	1–4	4–4	9–4	0 / 56	63–56	53%
Year-end championships
WTA Finals	DNQ										NH	SF	DNQ					0 / 1	2–2	50%
WTA Elite Trophy	DNQ								F	DNQ	NH			RR	NH			0 / 2	2–4	33%
National representation
Summer Olympics	NH		A	NH			A	NH				1R	NH		2R	NH		0 / 2	1–2	33%
WTA 1000
Dubai / Qatar Open (Note: The first Premier 5 event of the year has switched back and forth between the Dubai Tennis Championships and the Qatar Ladies Open from 2009 until 2024. Dubai was classified as a Premier 5 event from 2009 to 2011 before being succeeded by Doha for the 2012–2014 period. In 2015, Dubai regained its Premier 5 status while Doha was demoted to Premier status. The Premier 5 tournaments were reclassified as WTA 1000 tournaments in 2021.)	A	A	A	2R	A	A	A	A	1R	1R	1R	A	SF	2R	3R	2R	A	0 / 8	8–8	50%
Indian Wells Open	A	A	A	A	1R	1R	A	QF	2R	1R	NH	SF	1R	SF	2R	1R	A	0 / 10	10–10	50%
Miami Open	A	A	A	A	A	1R	A	2R	2R	2R	NH	W	1R	1R	2R	1R	1R	1 / 10	9–9	50%
Madrid Open	A	A	A	A	A	A	A	A	1R	2R	NH	1R	2R	1R	1R	1R	A	0 / 7	2–7	22%
Italian Open	A	A	A	1R	A	2R	A	1R	1R	QF	SF	SF	QF	QF	1R	1R	A	0 / 11	13–11	54%
Canadian Open	A	A	A	A	A	A	A	1R	QF	2R	NH	2R	1R	W	1R	QF	1R	1 / 9	11–8	58%
Cincinnati Open	A	A	A	1R	A	A	A	2R	2R	1R	2R	QF	1R	1R	1R	2R	2R	0 / 11	7–11	39%
Guadalajara Open	NH												2R	2R	NH			0 / 2	2–2	50%
Pan Pacific / Wuhan Open (Note: In 2014, the Pan Pacific Open was downgraded to a Premier event and replaced by the Wuhan Open. The Premier 5 tournaments were reclassified as WTA 1000 tournaments in 2021.)	A	A	A	A	A	A	A	F	SF	1R	NH				1R	2R	1R	0 / 6	8–6	57%
China Open	A	A	A	A	A	A	1R	1R	1R	SF	NH			1R	1R	2R	1R	0 / 8	4–8	33%
Career statistics (Note: Including Olympic Games and Billie Jean King Cup matches.)
Tournaments	1	7	6	19	14	13	15	23	27	29	11	21	24	28	32	26		Total: 296		
Titles	0	0	1	2	2	0	1	2	0	3	1	5	0	2	1	0		Total: 20		
Finals	1	0	1	2	2	2	4	3	2	4	1	5	1	5	3	0		Total: 36		
Overall win–loss	3–1	6–7	6–5	21–18	15–12	12–13	17–14	24–21	18–28	36–26	17–10	39–17	36–24	37–27	24–29	17–26		20 / 296	326–278	54%
Win %	75%	46%	55%	54%	56%	48%	55%	53%	39%	58%	63%	70%	60%	58%	45%	40%		Overall: 54%		
Year-end ranking	178	90	87	34	50	70	50	29	42	26	22	5	23	12	47	47		$2,896,597		

== Grand Slam tournament finals ==
=== Doubles: 1 (runner-up) ===
Result	Year	Championship	Surface	Partner	Opponents	Score
Loss	2023	Australian Open	Hard	(Japan) Ena Shibahara	(Czech Republic) Barbora Krejčíková (Czech Republic) Kateřina Siniaková	4–6, 3–6

== Other significant finals ==
=== WTA Elite Trophy ===
==== Doubles: 1 (runner–up) ====
Result	Year	Location	Surface	Partner	Opponents	Score
Loss	2018	Zhuhai, China	Hard (i)	(Belarus) Lidziya Marozava	(Ukraine) Lyudmyla Kichenok (Ukraine) Nadiia Kichenok	4–6, 6–3, [7–10]

=== WTA 1000 tournaments ===
==== Doubles: 3 (2 titles, 1 runner-up) ====
Result	Date	Tournament	Surface	Partner	Opponents	Score
Loss	2017	Wuhan Open	Hard	(China) Yang Zhaoxuan	(Chinese Taipei) Chan Yung-jan (Switzerland) Martina Hingis	6–7^{(5)}, 6–3, [4–10]
Win	2021	Miami Open	Hard	(Japan) Ena Shibahara	(United States) Hayley Carter (Brazil) Luisa Stefani	6–2, 7–5
Win	2023	Canadian Open	Hard	(Japan) Ena Shibahara	(United States) Desirae Krawczyk (Netherlands) Demi Schuurs	6–4, 4–6, [13–11]

== WTA Tour finals ==
=== Doubles: 38 (21 titles, 17 runner-ups) ===
Legend Grand Slam (0–1) Elite Trophy (0–1) WTA 1000 (2–1) WTA 500 (6–4) WTA 250 (13–10)	Finals by surface Hard (17–15) Grass (4–1) Clay (0–1)

Result	W–L	Date	Tournament	Tier	Surface	Partner	Opponents	Score
Loss	0–1	Oct 2010	Japan Women's Open, Japan	International (Note: The WTA International tournaments were reclassified as WTA 250 tournaments in 2021.)	Hard	(Japan) Rika Fujiwara	(Chinese Taipei) Chang Kai-chen (United States) Lilia Osterloh	0–6, 3–6
Win	1–1	Aug 2012	Washington Open, United States	International	Hard	(Chinese Taipei) Chang Kai-chen	(United States) Irina Falconi (South Africa) Chanelle Scheepers	7–5, 6–2
Win	2–1	Mar 2013	Malaysian Open, Malaysia	International	Hard	(Chinese Taipei) Chang Kai-chen	(Slovakia) Janette Husárová (China) Zhang Shuai	6–7^{(4)}, 7–6^{(4)}, [14–12]
Win	3–1	Aug 2013	Washington Open, US (2)	International	Hard	(Russia) Vera Dushevina	(Canada) Eugenie Bouchard (United States) Taylor Townsend	6–3, 6–3
Win	4–1	Aug 2014	Washington Open, US (3)	International	Hard	(Canada) Gabriela Dabrowski	(Japan) Hiroko Kuwata (Japan) Kurumi Nara	6–1, 6–2
Win	5–1	Oct 2014	Japan Women's Open	International	Hard	(Czech Republic) Renata Voráčová	(Spain) Lara Arruabarrena (Germany) Tatjana Maria	6–1, 6–2
Loss	5–2	Jan 2015	Auckland Open, New Zealand	International	Hard	(Czech Republic) Renata Voráčová	(Italy) Sara Errani (Italy) Roberta Vinci	2–6, 1–6
Loss	5–3	Feb 2015	Pattaya Open, Thailand	International	Hard	(Thailand) Tamarine Tanasugarn	(Chinese Taipei) Chan Hao-ching (Chinese Taipei) Chan Yung-jan	6–2, 4–6, [3–10]
Loss	5–4	May 2016	Nuremberg Cup, Germany	International	Clay	(Czech Republic) Renata Voráčová	(Netherlands) Kiki Bertens (Sweden) Johanna Larsson	3–6, 4–6
Loss	5–5	Jul 2016	Washington Open, US	International	Hard	(Japan) Risa Ozaki	(Romania) Monica Niculescu (Belgium) Yanina Wickmayer	4–6, 3–6
Loss	5–6	Aug 2016	Jiangxi International, China	International	Hard	(Japan) Makoto Ninomiya	(China) Liang Chen (China) Lu Jingjing	6–3, 6–7^{(2)}, [11–13]
Win	6–6	Sep 2016	Japan Women's Open (2)	International	Hard	(Japan) Makoto Ninomiya	(United Kingdom) Jocelyn Rae (United Kingdom) Anna Smith	6–3, 6–3
Win	7–6	Aug 2017	Washington Open, US (4)	International	Hard	(Czech Republic) Renata Voráčová	(Canada) Eugenie Bouchard (United States) Sloane Stephens	6–3, 6–2
Win	8–6	Sep 2017	Japan Women's Open (3)	International	Hard	(China) Yang Zhaoxuan	(Australia) Monique Adamczak (Australia) Storm Sanders	6–0, 2–6, [10–5]
Loss	8–7	Sep 2017	Wuhan Open, China	Premier 5 (Note: The Premier 5 & Mandatory tournaments were reclassified as WTA 1000 tournaments in 2021.)	Hard	(China) Yang Zhaoxuan	(Chinese Taipei) Chan Yung-jan (Switzerland) Martina Hingis	6–7^{(5)}, 6–3, [4–10]
Loss	8–8	Oct 2018	Hong Kong Open, China SAR	International	Hard	(Belarus) Lidziya Marozava	(Australia) Samantha Stosur (China) Zhang Shuai	4–6, 4–6
Loss	8–9	Nov 2018	Zhuhai, China	Elite	Hard (i)	(Belarus) Lidziya Marozava	(Ukraine) Lyudmyla Kichenok (Ukraine) Nadiia Kichenok	4–6, 6–3, [7–10]
Win	9–9	Jun 2019	Rosmalen Open, Netherlands (1)	International	Grass	(Serbia) Aleksandra Krunić	(Netherlands) Lesley Kerkhove (Netherlands) Bibiane Schoofs	7–5, 6–3
Loss	9–10	Aug 2019	Silicon Valley Classic, US	Premier (Note: The WTA Premier tournaments were reclassified as WTA 500 tournaments in 2021.)	Hard	(Japan) Ena Shibahara	(United States) Nicole Melichar (Czech Republic) Květa Peschke	4–6, 4–6
Win	10–10	Oct 2019	Tianjin Open, China	International	Hard	(Japan) Ena Shibahara	(Japan) Nao Hibino (Japan) Miyu Kato	6–3, 7–5
Win	11–10	Oct 2019	Kremlin Cup, Russia	Premier	Hard (i)	(Japan) Ena Shibahara	(Belgium) Kirsten Flipkens (United States) Bethanie Mattek-Sands	6–2, 6–1
Win	12–10	Feb 2020	St. Petersburg Trophy, Russia	Premier	Hard (i)	(Japan) Ena Shibahara	(United States) Kaitlyn Christian (Chile) Alexa Guarachi	4–6, 6–0, [10–3]
Win	13–10	Jan 2021	Abu Dhabi Open, UAE	WTA 500	Hard	(Japan) Ena Shibahara	(United States) Hayley Carter (Brazil) Luisa Stefani	7–6^{(5)}, 6–4
Win	14–10	Feb 2021	Yarra Valley Classic, Australia	WTA 500	Hard	(Japan) Ena Shibahara	(Russia) Anna Kalinskaya (Slovakia) Viktória Kužmová	6–3, 6–4
Win	15–10	Apr 2021	Miami Open, United States	WTA 1000	Hard	(Japan) Ena Shibahara	(United States) Hayley Carter (Brazil) Luisa Stefani	6–2, 7–5
Win	16–10	Jun 2021	Eastbourne International, UK	WTA 500	Grass	(Japan) Ena Shibahara	(United States) Nicole Melichar (Netherlands) Demi Schuurs	6–1, 6–4
Win	17–10	Aug 2021	Tennis in Cleveland, US	WTA 250	Hard	(Japan) Ena Shibahara	(United States) Christina McHale (India) Sania Mirza	7–5, 6–3
Loss	17–11	Aug 2022	Silicon Valley Classic, US	WTA 500	Hard	(Chinese Taipei) Chan Hao-ching	(China) Xu Yifan (China) Yang Zhaoxuan	5–7, 0–6
Loss	17–12	Jan 2023	Australian Open, Australia	Grand Slam	Hard	(Japan) Ena Shibahara	(Czech Republic) Barbora Krejčíková (Czech Republic) Kateřina Siniaková	4–6, 3–6
Loss	17–13	Feb 2023	Abu Dhabi Open, U.A.E.	WTA 500	Hard	(Chinese Taipei) Chan Hao-ching	(Brazil) Luisa Stefani (China) Zhang Shuai	6–3, 2–6, [8–10]
Win	18–13	Jun 2023	Rosmalen Open, Netherlands (2)	WTA 250	Grass	(Japan) Ena Shibahara	(Slovakia) Viktória Hrunčáková (Slovakia) Tereza Mihalíková	6–3, 6–3
Win	19–13	Aug 2023	Canadian Open, Canada	WTA 1000	Hard	(Japan) Ena Shibahara	(United States) Desirae Krawczyk (Netherlands) Demi Schuurs	6–4, 4–6, [13–11]
Loss	19–14	Oct 2023	Zhengzhou Open, China	WTA 500	Hard	(Japan) Ena Shibahara	(Canada) Gabriela Dabrowski (New Zealand) Erin Routliffe	2–6, 4–6
Loss	19–15	Aug 2024	Tennis in Cleveland, United States	WTA 250	Hard	(Japan) Eri Hozumi	(Spain) Cristina Bucșa (China) Xu Yifan	6–3, 3–6, [6–10]
Win	20–15	Oct 2024	Pan Pacific Open, Japan	WTA 500	Hard	(Japan) Eri Hozumi	(Japan) Ena Shibahara (Germany) Laura Siegemund	6–4, 7–6^{(4–7)}
Loss	20–16	Oct 2024	Hong Kong Open	WTA 250	Hard	(Japan) Eri Hozumi	(Norway) Ulrikke Eikeri (Japan) Makoto Ninomiya	4–6, 6–4, [9–11]
Win	21–16	Jun 2026	Rosmalen Open, Netherlands (3)	WTA 250	Grass	(Chinese Taipei) Liang En-shuo	(Estonia) Ingrid Neel (Mexico) Giuliana Olmos	6–2, 2–6, [10–7]
Loss	21–17	Jun 2026	Nottingham Open, UK	WTA 250	Grass	(Chinese Taipei) Chan Hao-ching	(United Kingdom) Harriet Dart (United Kingdom) Maia Lumsden	3–6, 4–6

== WTA 125 finals ==
=== Doubles: 1 (title) ===
Result	W–L	Date	Tournament	Surface	Partner	Opponents	Score
Win	1–0	May 2026	Clarins Open, France	Clay	(Chinese Taipei) Liang En-shuo	(Ukraine) Lyudmyla Kichenok (United States) Desirae Krawczyk	7–6^{(7–5)}, 6–2

== ITF Circuit finals ==
=== Singles: 9 (4 titles, 5 runner-ups) ===
Legend $75,000 tournaments (0–1) $50,000 tournaments $25,000 tournaments (3–4) $10,000 tournaments (1–0)	Finals by surface Hard (1–2) Clay (0–1) Grass (2–1) Carpet (1–1)

Result	W–L	Date	Tournament	Tier	Surface	Opponent	Score
Win	1–0	Jun 2010	ITF Tokyo, Japan	10,000	Hard	(Japan) Erika Takao	7–6^{(3)}, 6–3
Loss	1–1	Apr 2012	ITF Bundaberg, Australia	25,000	Clay	(Poland) Sandra Zaniewska	3–6, 2–6
Loss	1–2	Feb 2013	Launceston International, Australia	25,000	Hard	(Australia) Storm Sanders	4–6, 4–6
Win	2–2	Oct 2013	ITF Hamamatsu, Japan	25,000	Grass	(Japan) Eri Hozumi	7–6^{(7)}, 6–1
Loss	2–3	Feb 2014	Rancho Santa Fe Open, United States	25,000	Hard	(Austria) Tamira Paszek	1–6, 1–6
Loss	2–4	Oct 2014	ITF Makinohara, Japan	25,000	Grass	(Germany) Tatjana Maria	1–6, 2–6
Loss	2–5	Nov 2014	Toyota World Challenge, Japan	75,000	Carpet (i)	(Belgium) An-Sophie Mestach	1–6, 1–6
Win	3–5	Oct 2015	ITF Hamamatsu, Japan	25,000	Grass	(Japan) Miyu Kato	6–2, 6–1
Win	4–5	Oct 2016	ITF Hamamatsu, Japan	25,000	Carpet	(Russia) Ksenia Lykina	6–4, 6–4

=== Doubles: 39 (30 titles, 9 runner-ups) ===
Legend $100,000 tournaments (5–1) $75,000 tournaments (2–1) $50,000 tournaments (8–3) $25,000 tournaments (12–4) $10,000 tournaments (3–0)	Finals by surface Hard (20–5) Clay (2–2) Grass (3–0) Carpet (5–2)

Result	W–L	Date	Tournament	Tier	Surface	Partner	Opponents	Score
Win	1–0	Mar 2009	Kōfu International Open, Japan	10,000	Hard	(Japan) Akari Inoue	(Japan) Maki Arai (Japan) Miki Miyamura	7–5, 3–6, [10–8]
Win	2–0	Jun 2010	ITF Komoro, Japan	10,000	Clay	(Japan) Maya Kato	(South Korea) Kim Kun-hee (South Korea) Yu Min-hwa	2–6, 6–2, [11–9]
Win	3–0	Jun 2010	ITF Tokyo, Japan	10,000	Hard	(Japan) Akari Inoue	(South Korea) Chang Kyung-mi (South Korea) Yoo Mi	7–6^{(3)}, 6–0
Loss	3–1	Sep 2010	ITF Noto, Japan	25,000	Carpet	(Japan) Akari Inoue	(Japan) Rika Fujiwara (Thailand) Tamarine Tanasugarn	3–6, 3–6
Win	4–1	Nov 2010	Toyota World Challenge, Japan	75,000	Carpet (i)	(Japan) Rika Fujiwara	(Romania) Irina-Camelia Begu (Romania) Mădălina Gojnea	1–6, 6–3, [11–9]
Win	5–1	Jan 2011	ITF Pingguo, China	25,000	Hard	(Japan) Rika Fujiwara	(China) Liu Wanting (China) Sun Shengnan	6–4, 6–3
Loss	5–2	Feb 2011	Rancho Santa Fe Open, United States	25,000	Hard	(Japan) Remi Tezuka	(United States) Julie Ditty (Bosnia and Herzegovina) Mervana Jugić-Salkić	0–6, 2–6
Win	6–2	Feb 2011	ITF Surprise, United States	25,000	Hard	(Japan) Remi Tezuka	(Bosnia and Herzegovina) Mervana Jugić-Salkić (United States) Tetiana Luzhanska	6–3, 6–1
Win	7–2	Mar 2011	ITF Anning, China	25,000	Hard	(Japan) Rika Fujiwara	(Ukraine) Irina Buryachok (Ukraine) Veronika Kapshay	6–3, 6–2
Win	8–2	Apr 2011	ITF Wenshan, China	50,000	Hard (i)	(Japan) Rika Fujiwara	(China) Liang Chen (China) Tian Ran	6–4, 6–0
Win	9–2	May 2011	Fukuoka International, Japan	50,000	Grass	(Japan) Rika Fujiwara	(Japan) Aiko Nakamura (Japan) Junri Namigata	7–6^{(3)}, 6–0
Win	10–2	May 2011	ITF Karuizawa, Japan	25,000	Carpet	(Japan) Rika Fujiwara	(Japan) Natsumi Hamamura (Japan) Ayumi Oka	6–4, 6–4
Win	11–2	Oct 2011	ITF Makinohara, Japan	25,000	Carpet	(Japan) Kotomi Takahata	(Japan) Junri Namigata (Japan) Akiko Yonemura	6–2, 7–5
Win	12–2	Feb 2012	Launceston International, Australia	25,000	Hard	(Japan) Kotomi Takahata	(Chinese Taipei) Hsieh Shu-ying (China) Zheng Saisai	6–4, 6–4
Loss	12–3	Mar 2012	ITF Ipswich, Australia	25,000	Clay	(Japan) Junri Namigata	(Australia) Monique Adamczak (Poland) Sandra Zaniewska	5–7, 4–6
Win	13–3	Mar 2012	ITF Bundaberg, Australia	25,000	Clay	(Japan) Junri Namigata	(Australia) Sacha Jones (Australia) Sally Peers	6–1, 7–5
Loss	13–4	Jul 2012	ITF Waterloo, Canada	50,000	Clay	(Canada) Gabriela Dabrowski	(Canada) Sharon Fichman (Canada) Marie-Ève Pelletier	2–6, 5–7
Loss	13–5	Jul 2012	Challenger de Granby, Canada	25,000	Hard	(Japan) Miki Miyamura	(Canada) Sharon Fichman (Canada) Marie-Ève Pelletier	6–4, 5–7, [4–10]
Win	14–5	Jul 2012	Lexington Challenger, US	50,000	Hard	(China) Xu Yifan	(Israel) Julia Glushko (Australia) Olivia Rogowska	7–5, 6–7^{(7)}, [10–4]
Win	15–5	Aug 2012	Bronx Open, US	50,000	Hard	(Japan) Erika Sema	(Japan) Eri Hozumi (Japan) Miki Miyamura	6–4, 7–6^{(4)}
Win	16–5	Sep 2012	Ningbo International, China	100,000	Hard	(Chinese Taipei) Chang Kai-chen	(United States) Tetiana Luzhanska (China) Zheng Saisai	6–2, 7–5
Win	17–5	Oct 2012	ITF Hamamatsu, Japan	25,000	Grass	(Japan) Miki Miyamura	(Australia) Monique Adamczak (United States) Alexa Glatch	3–6, 6–4, [10–6]
Win	18–5	Feb 2013	Burnie International, Australia	25,000	Hard	(Japan) Erika Sema	(Australia) Bojana Bobusic (Australia) Jessica Moore	w/o
Win	19–5	Oct 2013	ITF Hamamatsu, Japan	25,000	Grass	(Japan) Junri Namigata	(Switzerland) Belinda Bencic (Georgia (country)) Sofia Shapatava	6–4, 6–3
Win	20–5	Nov 2013	Toyota World Challenge, Japan	75,000	Carpet (i)	(Japan) Misaki Doi	(Japan) Eri Hozumi (Japan) Makoto Ninomiya	7–6^{(1)}, 2–6, [11–9]
Win	21–5	Feb 2014	ITF Surprise, US	25,000	Hard	(Japan) Eri Hozumi	(United States) Sanaz Marand (United States) Ashley Weinhold	6–3, 7–5
Win	22–5	May 2014	Fukuoka International, Japan	50,000	Carpet	(Japan) Eri Hozumi	(United Kingdom) Naomi Broady (Greece) Eleni Daniilidou	6–3, 6–4
Loss	22–6	Jul 2014	Lexington Challenger, US	50,000	Hard	(United States) Keri Wong	(United Kingdom) Jocelyn Rae (United Kingdom) Anna Smith	4–6, 4–6
Loss	22–7	Nov 2014	Toyota World Challenge, Japan	75,000	Carpet (i)	(Japan) Junri Namigata	(Japan) Eri Hozumi (Japan) Makoto Ninomiya	3–6, 5–7
Win	23–7	Oct 2015	Nanjing Ladies Open, China	100,000	Hard	(Japan) Eri Hozumi	(Chinese Taipei) Chan Chin-wei (China) Zhang Kailin	7–5, 6–7^{(7)}, [10–7]
Win	24–7	Nov 2015	Tokyo Open, Japan	100,000	Hard	(Japan) Makoto Ninomiya	(Japan) Eri Hozumi (Japan) Kurumi Nara	3–6, 6–2, [10–7]
Win	25–7	Mar 2016	Blossom Cup, China	50,000	Hard	(Japan) Makoto Ninomiya	(China) Lu Jingjing (China) Zhang Yuxuan	6–3, 6–0
Win	26–7	Apr 2016	Kōfu International Open, Japan	25,000	Hard	(Japan) Erina Hayashi	(Japan) Kanae Hisami (Japan) Kotomi Takahata	7–5, 7–5
Win	27–7	Apr 2016	Pingshan Open, China	50,000	Hard	(Japan) Makoto Ninomiya	(China) Liang Chen (China) Wang Yafan	7–6^{(5)}, 6–4
Win	28–7	Jul 2016	ITF Wuhan, China	50,000	Hard	(Japan) Makoto Ninomiya	(Chinese Taipei) Chang Kai-chen (China) Duan Yingying	6–4, 6–4
Loss	28–8	Oct 2016	Bendigo International, Australia	50,000	Hard	(Japan) Risa Ozaki	(United States) Asia Muhammad (Australia) Arina Rodionova	4–6, 3–6
Win	29–8	Jul 2017	Southsea Trophy, UK	100,000	Grass	(China) Yang Zhaoxuan	(Switzerland) Viktorija Golubic (Ukraine) Lyudmyla Kichenok	6–7^{(7)}, 6–3, [10–8]
Loss	29–9	Nov 2017	Shenzhen Longhua Open, China	100,000	Hard	(China) Yang Zhaoxuan	(United States) Jacqueline Cako (Serbia) Nina Stojanović	4–6, 2–6
Win	30–9	Nov 2018	Shenzhen Longhua Open, China	100,000	Hard	(China) Yang Zhaoxuan	(South Korea) Choi Ji-hee (Thailand) Luksika Kumkhum	6–2, 6–3
