= Laura Siegemund career statistics =

Statistics of professional German tennis player

Career finals
Discipline	Type	Won	Lost	Total
Singles	Grand Slam	–	–	–
Singles	WTA Finals	–	–	–
Singles	WTA 1000	–	–	–
Singles	WTA Tour	2	3	5
Singles	Olympics	–	–	–
Singles	Total	2	3	5
Doubles	Grand Slam	1	1	2
Doubles	WTA Finals	1	0	1
Doubles	WTA 1000	1	3	4
Doubles	WTA Tour	13	7	20
Doubles	Olympics	–	–	–
Doubles	Total	16	11	27
Mixed	Grand Slam	2	0	2
Mixed	Total	2	0	2

This is a list of the main career statistics of professional German tennis player Laura Siegemund. She has won two singles titles on the WTA Tour. In doubles, she has won sixteen titles, including the 2020 US Open and the 2023 WTA Finals. She has also won two Grand Slam mixed doubles titles, the 2016 US Open and the 2024 French Open.

== Performance timelines ==
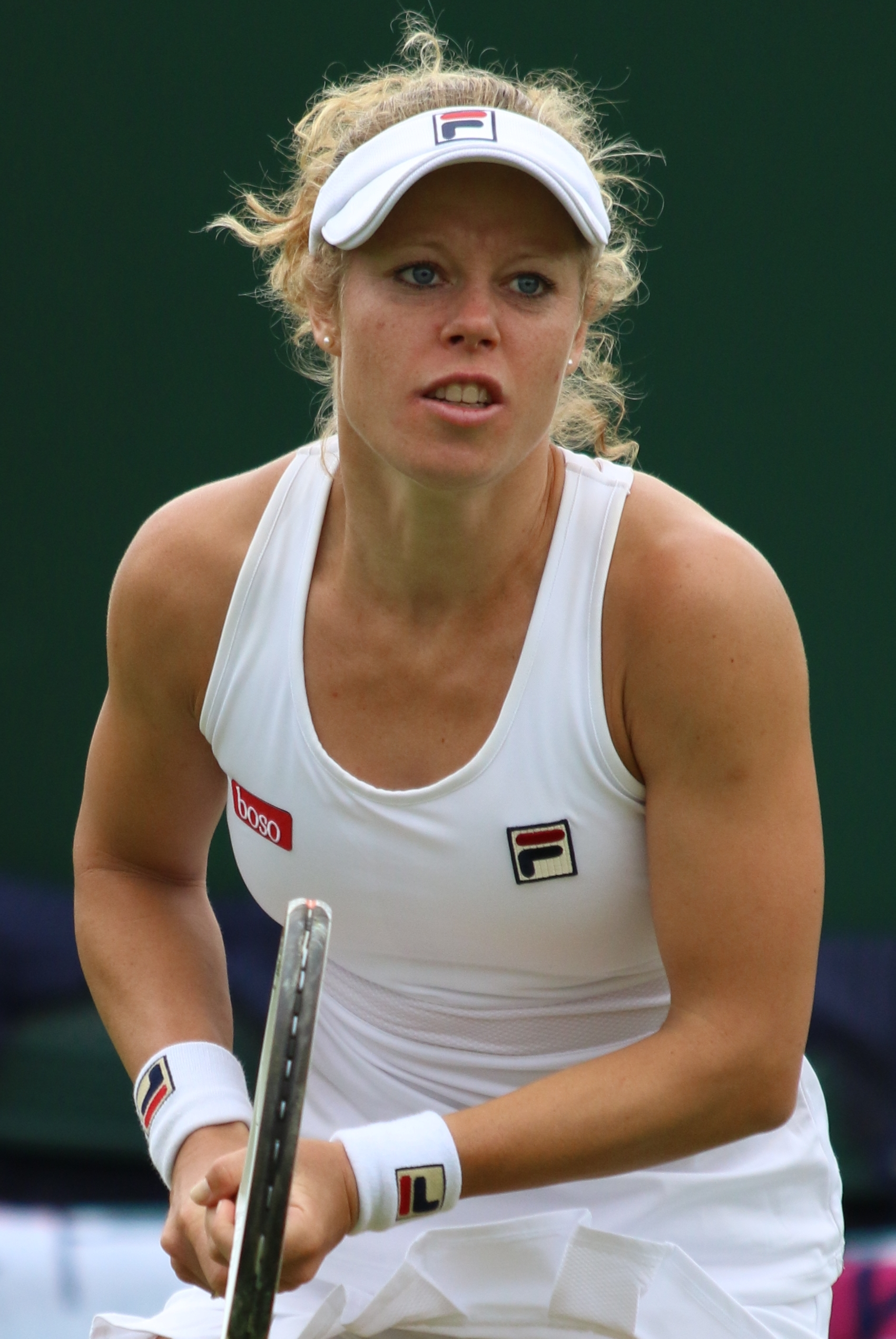
Siegemund in 2019

Key
W	F	SF	QF	#R	RR	Q#	P#	DNQ	A	Z#	PO	G	S	B	NMS	NTI	P	NH

(W) winner; (F) finalist; (SF) semifinalist; (QF) quarterfinalist; (#R) rounds 4, 3, 2, 1; (RR) round-robin stage; (Q#) qualification round; (P#) preliminary round; (DNQ) did not qualify; (A) absent; (Z#) Davis/Fed Cup Zonal Group (with number indication) or (PO) play-off; (G) gold, (S) silver or (B) bronze Olympic/Paralympic medal; (NMS) not a Masters tournament; (NTI) not a Tier I tournament; (P) postponed; (NH) not held; (SR) strike rate (events won / competed); (W–L) win–loss record.
To avoid confusion and double counting, these charts are updated at the conclusion of a tournament or when the player's participation has ended.

Only main-draw results in WTA Tour, Grand Slam tournaments, Billie Jean King Cup, United Cup and Olympic Games are included in win–loss records.

=== Singles ===
Current through the 2026 WTA Tour.

Tournament	2006	2007	2008	2009	2010	2011	2012	2013	2014	2015	2016	2017	2018	2019	2020	2021	2022	2023	2024	2025	2026	SR	W–L	Win %
Grand Slam tournaments
Australian Open	A	A	A	A	A	A	A	A	A	Q3	3R	1R	A	2R	2R	1R	A	3R	2R	3R	2R	0 / 9	10–9	53%
French Open	A	A	A	A	A	Q2	A	A	Q3	Q2	1R	A	1R	2R	QF	1R	Q3	A	1R	1R	1R	0 / 8	5–8	38%
Wimbledon	A	A	A	A	A	Q1	A	A	Q2	1R	1R	A	A	2R	NH	1R	A	Q3	2R	QF	1R	0 / 7	6–7	46%
US Open	A	A	A	Q1	A	Q1	A	Q2	Q3	1R	3R	A	1R	2R	1R	A	1R	1R	1R	3R	A	0 / 9	5–9	36%
Win–loss	0–0	0–0	0–0	0–0	0–0	0–0	0–0	0–0	0–0	0–2	4–4	0–1	0–2	4–4	5–3	0–3	0–1	2–2	2–4	8–4	1–3	0 / 33	26–33	44%
National representation
Olympic Games	not held		A	not held			A	not held			QF	not held				1R	not held		1R	not held		0 / 3	3–3	50%
BJK Cup	A	A	A	A	A	A	A	A	A	A	A	1R	A	1R	QR	A	QR	RR	1R	QR	A	0 / 4	4–3	57%
WTA 1000 + former Tier I tournaments
Qatar Open	not Tier I		A	not held		NTI	A	A	A	NTI	A	NTI	A	NTI	2R	NTI	A	NTI	Q2	Q2	1R	0 / 2	1–2	33%
Dubai Open	not Tier I			A	A	A	not Tier I			A	NTI	2R	NTI	A	NTI	1R	NTI	1R	Q1	A	1R	0 / 4	1–4	20%
Indian Wells Open	A	A	A	A	A	A	A	A	A	A	2R	1R	A	1R	NH	A	A	1R	Q1	Q1	2R	0 / 5	2–5	29%
Miami Open	A	A	A	A	A	A	A	A	A	A	Q1	1R	A	1R	NH	2R	1R	2R	2R	Q2	2R	0 / 7	4–6	40%
Madrid Open	not held			A	A	A	A	A	A	A	3R	2R	A	Q2	NH	2R	A	2R	1R	Q1	2R	0 / 6	6–6	50%
Italian Open	A	A	A	A	A	A	A	A	A	A	A	2R	1R	A	A	1R	A	A	2R	3R	3R	0 / 6	5–5	50%
Canadian Open	A	A	A	A	A	A	A	A	A	A	A	A	A	A	NH	A	Q1	A	A	2R	A	0 / 1	1–1	50%
Cincinnati Open	not Tier I			A	A	A	A	A	A	A	A	A	A	A	2R	A	A	Q1	A	1R	A	0 / 2	1–2	33%
China Open	not Tier I			A	A	A	A	A	A	A	1R	A	2R	A	not held			A	1R	1R	A	0 / 4	1–4	20%
Wuhan Open	not held								A	A	2R	A	A	A	not held				Q1	QF	A	0 / 2	4–2	67%
German Open	Q1	A	A	not held / not WTA 1000																		0 / 0	0–0	–
Win–loss	0–0	0–0	0–0	0–0	0–0	0–0	0–0	0–0	0–0	0–0	4–4	3–5	1–2	0–2	2–2	2–3	0–1	2–4	2–4	5–4	5–6	0 / 39	26–37	41%
Career statistics
	2006	2007	2008	2009	2010	2011	2012	2013	2014	2015	2016	2017	2018	2019	2020	2021	2022	2023	2024	2025	2026	SR	W–L	Win %
Tournaments	0	0	0	0	1	0	0	0	2	7	20	13	11	20	8	14	7	11	17	15	12	Career total: 158		
Titles	0	0	0	0	0	0	0	0	0	0	1	1	0	0	0	0	0	0	0	0	0	Career total: 2		
Finals	0	0	0	0	0	0	0	0	0	0	2	1	0	0	0	0	0	1	1	0	0	Career total: 5		
Hard win–loss	0–0	0–0	0–0	0–0	0–0	0–0	0–0	0–0	0–0	4–3	10–10	1–8	1–3	7–13	5–5	4–7	1–5	12–10	11–9	9–10	3–5	0 / 85	68–88	44%
Clay win–loss	0–0	0–0	0–0	0–0	0–1	0–0	0–0	0–0	1–2	1–3	18–6	12–4	7–8	7–7	8–3	2–4	2–3	1–1	7–7	1–3	4–4	2 / 58	71–56	56%
Grass win–loss	0–0	0–0	0–0	0–0	0–0	0–0	0–0	0–0	0–0	0–1	1–3	0–0	0–0	1–1	0–0	2–2	0–0	0–1	1–1	4–3	1–3	0 / 15	10–15	40%
Overall win–loss	0–0	0–0	0–0	0–0	0–1	0–0	0–0	0–0	1–2	5–7	29–19	13–12	8–11	15–21	13–8	8–13	3–8	13–12	19–17	14–16	8–12	2 / 158	149–159	48%
Win %	–	–	–	–	0%	–	–	–	33%	42%	60%	52%	42%	42%	62%	38%	27%	52%	53%	47%	40%	Career total: 48%		
Year-end ranking	367	319	307	227	225	243	383	235	161	90	31	69	117	73	50	124	169	86	84	46	195			

=== Doubles ===
Current through the 2026 WTA Tour.

Tournament	2006	2007	2008	2009	2010	2011	2012	2013	2014	2015	2016	2017	2018	2019	2020	2021	2022	2023	2024	2025	2026	SR	W–L	Win %
Grand Slam tournaments
Australian Open	A	A	A	A	A	A	A	A	A	A	1R	2R	A	1R	1R	3R	A	1R	QF	3R	3R	0 / 9	10–9	53%
French Open	A	A	A	A	A	A	A	A	A	A	3R	A	A	3R	2R	3R	1R	1R	3R	3R	QF	0 / 9	12–9	57%
Wimbledon	A	A	A	A	A	A	A	A	A	Q1	1R	A	A	3R	NH	3R	A	QF	QF	3R	3R	0 / 7	13–6	68%
US Open	A	A	A	A	A	A	A	A	A	2R	1R	A	3R	3R	W	A	A	F	3R	2R	A	1 / 8	18–7	72%
Win–loss	0–0	0–0	0–0	0–0	0–0	0–0	0–0	0–0	0–0	1–1	2–4	1–1	2–1	6–4	6–2	6–3	0–1	7–4	10–4	7–3	5–3	1 / 33	53–31	63%
Year-end championships
WTA Finals	did not qualify														NH	DNQ		W	did not qualify			1 / 1	4–1	80%
National representation
Olympic Games	not held		A	not held			A	not held			1R	not held				1R	not held		1R	not held		0 / 3	0–3	0%
BJK Cup	A	A	A	A	A	A	A	A	A	A	A	1R	A	1R	QR	A	QR	RR	1R	QR	A	0 / 4	1–5	17%
WTA 1000 tournaments + former Tier I tournaments
Qatar Open	not Tier I		A	not held		NTI	A	A	A	NTI	A	NTI	A	NTI	QF	NTI	A	NTI	A	SF	2R	0 / 3	5–3	63%
Dubai Open	not Tier I			A	A	A	not Tier I			A	NTI	A	NTI	A	NTI	2R	NTI	1R	SF	QF	F	0 / 5	10–5	67%
Indian Wells Open	A	A	A	A	A	A	A	A	A	A	1R	1R	A	A	NH	A	2R	F	1R	2R	2R	0 / 7	6–7	46%
Miami Open	A	A	A	A	A	A	A	A	A	A	2R	A	A	A	NH	A	W	2R	2R	A	1R	1 / 5	8–4	67%
Madrid Open	not held			A	A	A	A	A	A	A	1R	A	A	A	NH	1R	A	1R	F	QF	SF	0 / 6	9–6	60%
Italian Open	A	A	A	A	A	A	A	A	A	A	A	2R	A	A	1R	2R	A	A	A	A	2R	0 / 4	3–4	43%
Canadian Open	A	A	A	A	A	A	A	A	A	A	A	A	A	A	NH	A	2R	2R	A	1R	A	0 / 3	2–2	50%
Cincinnati Open	not Tier I			A	A	A	A	A	A	1R	A	A	A	A	1R	A	2R	1R	A	A	A	0 / 4	1–4	20%
China Open	not Tier I			A	A	A	A	A	A	A	1R	A	A	A	not held			QF	QF	QF	A	0 / 4	6–3	67%
Wuhan Open	not held								A	A	A	A	A	A	not held				1R	SF	A	0 / 2	3–2	60%
German Open	1R	A	A	not held / not WTA 1000																		0 / 1	0–1	0%
Win–loss	0–1	0–0	0–0	0–0	0–0	0–0	0–0	0–0	0–0	0–1	1–4	1–2	0–0	0–0	1–3	2–3	8–2	7–7	10–6	13–6	10–6	1 / 44	53–41	56%
Career statistics
	2006	2007	2008	2009	2010	2011	2012	2013	2014	2015	2016	2017	2018	2019	2020	2021	2022	2023	2024	2025	2026	SR	W–L	Win %
Tournaments	1	0	1	0	1	3	0	1	2	10	16	6	4	10	8	10	11	22	16	14	12	Career total: 148		
Titles	0	0	0	0	0	0	0	0	0	3	0	0	1	1	1	0	3	5	1	1	0	Career total: 16		
Finals	0	0	0	0	0	0	0	0	0	4	1	0	2	1	1	0	4	7	3	2	2	Career total: 27		
Hard win–loss	0–0	0–0	1–1	0–0	0–0	0–1	0–0	0–0	2–1	8–4	3–10	3–4	8–2	9–6	7–4	9–6	21–5	34–14	20–8	17–9	8–6	13 / 95	150–81	65%
Clay win–loss	0–1	0–0	0–0	0–0	0–1	1–2	0–0	0–1	1–1	10–3	4–4	2–4	1–1	2–1	2–3	3–3	2–2	2–3	8–3	5–3	6–4	1 / 40	49–40	55%
Grass win–loss	0–0	0–0	0–0	0–0	0–0	0–0	0–0	0–0	0–0	4–0	3–2	0–0	0–0	2–1	0–0	2–1	0–0	2–2	4–2	6–0	3–2	2 / 13	26–10	72%
Overall win–loss	0–1	0–0	1–1	0–0	0–1	1–3	0–0	0–1	3–2	22–7	10–16	5–8	9–3	13–8	9–7	14–10	23–7	38–19	32–13	28–12	17–12	16 / 148	225–131	63%
Win %	0%	–	50%	–	0%	25%	–	0%	60%	76%	38%	38%	75%	62%	56%	58%	77%	67%	71%	70%	59%	Career total: 63%		
Year-end ranking	206	372	211	152	179	289	1083	488	232	44	86	128	80	82	41	58	27	5	21	24	29			

=== Mixed doubles ===
Tournament	2016	2017	2018	2019	2020	2021	2022	2023	2024	2025	2026	SR	W–L	Win %
Grand Slam tournaments
Australian Open	A	1R	A	A	A	1R	A	A	QF	A	2R	0 / 4	3–4	43%
French Open	A	A	A	A	NH	1R	1R	A	W	QF	SF	1 / 5	10–4	71%
Wimbledon	2R	A	A	QF	NH	A	A	1R	1R	A	QF	0 / 5	6–5	55%
US Open	W	A	1R	1R	NH	A	1R	1R	A	A	A	1 / 5	5–4	56%
Win–loss	6–1	0–1	0–1	3–2	0–0	0–2	0–2	0–2	7–2	2–1	6–3	2 / 19	24–17	59%
National representation
Olympic Games	A	not held				QF	not held		1R	not held		0 / 2	1–2	33%
Career statistics
Overall win–loss	6–1	0–1	0–1	3–2	0–0	1–3	0–2	1–3	10–3	5–1	7–4	2 / 21	33–21	61%

== Grand Slam finals ==
=== Doubles: 2 (1 title, 1 runner-up) ===
Result	Year	Tournament	Surface	Partner	Opponents	Score
Win	2020	US Open	Hard	(Russia) Vera Zvonareva	(United States) Nicole Melichar (China) Xu Yifan	6–4, 6–4
Loss	2023	US Open	Hard	Vera Zvonareva	(Canada) Gabriela Dabrowski (New Zealand) Erin Routliffe	6–7^{(9–11)}, 3–6

=== Mixed doubles: 2 (2 titles) ===
Result	Year	Tournament	Surface	Partner	Opponents	Score
Win	2016	US Open	Hard	(Croatia) Mate Pavić	(United States) CoCo Vandeweghe (United States) Rajeev Ram	6–4, 6–4
Win	2024	French Open	Clay	(France) Édouard Roger-Vasselin	(United States) Desirae Krawczyk (United Kingdom) Neal Skupski	6–4, 7–5

== Other significant finals ==
=== WTA Finals ===
==== Doubles: 1 (1 title) ====
Result	Year	Tournament	Surface	Partner	Opponents	Score
Win	2023	WTA Finals, Cancún	Hard	Vera Zvonareva	(United States) Nicole Melichar-Martinez (Australia) Ellen Perez	6–4, 6–4

=== WTA 1000 ===
==== Doubles: 4 (1 title, 3 runner-ups) ====
Result	Year	Tournament	Surface	Partner	Opponents	Score
Win	2022	Miami Open	Hard	Vera Zvonareva	Veronika Kudermetova (Belgium) Elise Mertens	7–6^{(7–3)}, 7–5
Loss	2023	Indian Wells Open	Hard	(Brazil) Beatriz Haddad Maia	(Czech Republic) Barbora Krejčíková (Czech Republic) Kateřina Siniaková	1–6, 7–6^{(7–3)}, [7–10]
Loss	2024	Madrid Open	Clay	(Czech Republic) Barbora Krejčíková	(Spain) Cristina Bucșa (Spain) Sara Sorribes Tormo	0–6, 2–6
Loss	2026	Dubai Championships	Hard	Vera Zvonareva	(Canada) Gabriela Dabrowski (Brazil) Luisa Stefani	1–6, 3–6

== WTA Tour finals ==
=== Singles: 5 (2 titles, 3 runner-ups) ===
Legend Grand Slam (0–0) WTA Finals (0–0) WTA 1000 (0–0) WTA 500 (Premier) (1–1) WTA 250 (International) (1–2)	Finals by surface Hard (0–2) Clay (2–1) Grass (0–0)	Finals by setting Outdoor (1–2) Indoor (1–1)

Result	W–L	Date	Tournament	Tier	Surface	Opponent	Score
Loss	0–1	Apr 2016	Stuttgart Open, Germany	Premier	Clay (i)	(Germany) Angelique Kerber	4–6, 0–6
Win	1–1	Jul 2016	Swedish Open, Sweden	International	Clay	(Czech Republic) Kateřina Siniaková	7–5, 6–1
Win	2–1	Apr 2017	Stuttgart Open, Germany	Premier	Clay (i)	(France) Kristina Mladenovic	6–1, 2–6, 7–6^{(7–5)}
Loss	2–2	Jul 2023	Poland Open, Poland	WTA 250	Hard	(Poland) Iga Świątek	0–6, 1–6
Loss	2–3	Sep 2024	Thailand Open, Thailand	WTA 250	Hard	(Slovakia) Rebecca Šramková	4–6, 4–6

=== Doubles: 27 (16 titles, 11 runner-ups) ===
Legend Grand Slam (1–1) WTA Finals (1–0) WTA 1000 (1–3) WTA 500 (Premier) (2–4) WTA 250 (International) (11–3)	Finals by surface Hard (13–7) Clay (1–2) Grass (2–2)	Finals by setting Outdoor (12–10) Indoor (4–1)

Result	W–L	Date	Tournament	Tier	Surface	Partner	Opponents	Score
Loss	0–1	Apr 2015	Morocco Open, Morocco	International	Clay	(Ukraine) Maryna Zanevska	(Hungary) Tímea Babos (France) Kristina Mladenovic	1–6, 6–7^{(5–7)}
Win	1–1	Jun 2015	Rosmalen Open, Netherlands	International	Grass	(United States) Asia Muhammad	(Serbia) Jelena Janković (Russia) Anastasia Pavlyuchenkova	6–3, 7–5
Win	2–1	Jul 2015	Brasil Tennis Cup, Brazil	International	Clay	(Germany) Annika Beck	(Argentina) María Irigoyen (Poland) Paula Kania	6–3, 7–6^{(7–1)}
Win	3–1	Oct 2015	Luxembourg Open, Luxembourg	International	Hard (i)	(Germany) Mona Barthel	(Spain) Anabel Medina Garrigues (Spain) Arantxa Parra Santonja	6–2, 7–6^{(7–2)}
Loss	3–2	Jun 2016	Mallorca Open, Spain	International	Grass	(Germany) Anna-Lena Friedsam	(Canada) Gabriela Dabrowski (Spain) María José Martínez Sánchez	4–6, 2–6
Loss	3–3	Aug 2018	Connecticut Open, United States	Premier	Hard	(Chinese Taipei) Hsieh Su-wei	(Czech Republic) Andrea Sestini Hlaváčková (Czech Republic) Barbora Strýcová	4–6, 7–6^{(9–7)}, [4–10]
Win	4–3	Oct 2018	Kremlin Cup, Russia	Premier	Hard (i)	(Russia) Alexandra Panova	(Croatia) Darija Jurak (Romania) Raluca Olaru	6–2, 7–6^{(7–2)}
Win	5–3	Sep 2019	Guangzhou Open, China	International	Hard	(China) Peng Shuai	(Chile) Alexa Guarachi (Mexico) Giuliana Olmos	6–2, 6–1
Win	6–3	Sep 2020	US Open, United States	Grand Slam	Hard	(Russia) Vera Zvonareva	(United States) Nicole Melichar (China) Xu Yifan	6–4, 6–4
Win	7–3	Mar 2022	Lyon Open, France	WTA 250	Hard (i)	Vera Zvonareva	(United Kingdom) Alicia Barnett (United Kingdom) Olivia Nicholls	7–5, 6–1
Win	8–3	Apr 2022	Miami Open, United States	WTA 1000	Hard	Vera Zvonareva	Veronika Kudermetova (Belgium) Elise Mertens	7–6^{(7–3)}, 7–5
Loss	8–4	Oct 2022	Tallinn Open, Estonia	WTA 250	Hard (i)	(United States) Nicole Melichar-Martinez	(Ukraine) Lyudmyla Kichenok (Ukraine) Nadiia Kichenok	5–7, 6–4, [7–10]
Win	9–4	Oct 2022	Transylvania Open, Romania	WTA 250	Hard (i)	(Belgium) Kirsten Flipkens	Kamilla Rakhimova; Yana Sizikova	6–3, 7–5
Win	10–4	Jan 2023	Hobart International, Australia	WTA 250	Hard	(Belgium) Kirsten Flipkens	(Switzerland) Viktorija Golubic (Hungary) Panna Udvardy	6–4, 7–5
Loss	10–5	Mar 2023	Indian Wells Open, United States	WTA 1000	Hard	(Brazil) Beatriz Haddad Maia	(Czech Republic) Barbora Krejčíková (Czech Republic) Kateřina Siniaková	1–6, 7–6^{(7–3)}, [7–10]
Win	11–5	Aug 2023	Washington Open, United States	WTA 500	Hard	Vera Zvonareva	(Chile) Alexa Guarachi (Romania) Monica Niculescu	6–4, 6–4
Loss	11–6	Sep 2023	US Open, United States	Grand Slam	Hard	Vera Zvonareva	(Canada) Gabriela Dabrowski (New Zealand) Erin Routliffe	6–7^{(9–11)}, 3–6
Win	12–6	Sep 2023	Ningbo Open, China	WTA 250	Hard	Vera Zvonareva	(China) Guo Hanyu (China) Jiang Xinyu	4–6, 6–3, [10–5]
Win	13–6	Oct 2023	Jiangxi Open, China	WTA 250	Hard	Vera Zvonareva	(Japan) Eri Hozumi (Japan) Makoto Ninomiya	6–4, 6–2
Win	14–6	Nov 2023	WTA Finals, Mexico	WTA Finals	Hard	Vera Zvonareva	(United States) Nicole Melichar-Martinez (Australia) Ellen Perez	6–4, 6–4
Loss	14–7	May 2024	Madrid Open, Spain	WTA 1000	Clay	(Czech Republic) Barbora Krejčíková	(Spain) Cristina Bucșa (Spain) Sara Sorribes Tormo	0–6, 2–6
Win	15–7	Oct 2024	Japan Open, Japan	WTA 250	Hard	(Japan) Ena Shibahara	(Spain) Cristina Bucșa (Romania) Monica Niculescu	3–6, 6–2, [10–2]
Loss	15–8	Oct 2024	Pan Pacific Open, Japan	WTA 500	Hard	(Japan) Ena Shibahara	(Japan) Shuko Aoyama (Japan) Eri Hozumi	4–6, 6–7^{(3–7)}
Loss	15–9	Jan 2025	Adelaide International, Australia	WTA 500	Hard	(Brazil) Beatriz Haddad Maia	(China) Guo Hanyu; Alexandra Panova	5–7, 4–6
Win	16–9	Jun 2025	Nottingham Open, United Kingdom	WTA 250	Grass	(Brazil) Beatriz Haddad Maia	(Kazakhstan) Anna Danilina (Japan) Ena Shibahara	6–3, 6–2
Loss	16–10	Feb 2026	Dubai Championships, United Arab Emirates	WTA 1000	Hard	Vera Zvonareva	(Canada) Gabriela Dabrowski (Brazil) Luisa Stefani	1–6, 3–6
Loss	16–11	Jun 2026	Queen's Club Championships, United Kingdom	WTA 500	Grass	(Canada) Leylah Fernandez	(Slovakia) Tereza Mihalíková (United Kingdom) Olivia Nicholls	3–6, 7–6^{(7–4)}, [5–10]

== ITF Circuit finals ==
=== Singles: 28 (14 titles, 14 runner-ups) ===
Legend $100,000 tournaments (1–0) $50/60,000 tournaments (1–5) $25,000 tournaments (9–7) $10,000 tournaments (3–2)	Finals by surface Hard (0–4) Clay (14–10)

Result	W–L	Date	Tournament	Tier	Surface	Opponent	Score
Loss	0–1	Oct 2006	ITF Lagos, Nigeria	25,000	Hard	(Poland) Magdalena Kiszczyńska	4–6, 2–6
Win	1–1	Nov 2006	ITF Mallorca, Spain	10,000	Clay	(France) Gracia Radovanovic	6–4, 6–1
Loss	1–2	Nov 2007	ITF Jounieh, Lebanon	25,000	Clay	(Ukraine) Mariya Koryttseva	1–6, 3–6
Loss	1–3	Apr 2009	ITF Jackson, United States	25,000	Clay	(Ukraine) Yuliana Fedak	2–6, 1–6
Loss	1–4	May 2009	ITF Indian Harbour Beach, United States	50,000	Clay	(United States) Melanie Oudin	5–7, 7–5, 2–6
Loss	1–5	Apr 2010	ITF Charlottesville, United States	50,000	Clay	(Netherlands) Michaëlla Krajicek	2–6, 4–6
Win	2–5	Jan 2011	ITF Lutz, United States	25,000	Clay	(United States) Jessica Pegula	6–7^{(4–7)}, 6–1, 6–2
Loss	2–6	Apr 2012	ITF Wiesbaden, Germany	10,000	Clay	(Kazakhstan) Anna Danilina	6–7^{(2–7)}, 6–7^{(4–7)}
Win	3–6	Jul 2012	ITF Darmstadt, Germany	25,000	Clay	(Slovakia) Anna Karolína Schmiedlová	7–6^{(9–7)}, 6–3
Win	4–6	Jul 2012	ITF Horb, Germany	10,000	Clay	(Italy) Gaia Sanesi	6–3, 6–0
Win	5–6	Aug 2012	ITF Ratingen, Germany	10,000	Clay	(United States) Caitlin Whoriskey	6–2, 6–1
Loss	5–7	Jan 2013	ITF Stuttgart, Germany	10,000	Hard (i)	(Germany) Julia Kimmelmann	4–6, 3–6
Win	6–7	Apr 2013	ITF Jackson, United States	25,000	Clay	(Argentina) Florencia Molinero	6–4, 6–0
Win	7–7	Jun 2013	ITF Lenzerheide, Switzerland	25,000	Clay	(Brazil) Beatriz Haddad Maia	6–2, 6–3
Win	8–7	Jun 2013	ITF Stuttgart, Germany	25,000	Clay	(Switzerland) Viktorija Golubic	6–3, 3–6, 7–6^{(7–4)}
Win	9–7	Jan 2014	ITF Vero Beach, United States	25,000	Clay	(Canada) Gabriela Dabrowski	6–3, 7–6^{(12–10)}
Win	10–7	Apr 2014	ITF Pelham, United States	25,000	Clay	(Kazakhstan) Yulia Putintseva	6–1, 6–4
Loss	10–8	Aug 2014	ITF Hechingen, Germany	25,000	Clay	(Germany) Carina Witthöft	6–4, 4–6, 3–6
Loss	10–9	Nov 2014	ITF Sharm El Sheikh, Egypt	25,000	Hard	(Russia) Evgeniya Rodina	2–6, 2–6
Loss	10–10	Nov 2014	ITF Sharm El Sheikh, Egypt	25,000	Hard	(Russia) Evgeniya Rodina	7–5, 3–6, 2–6
Loss	10–11	Apr 2015	ITF Pelham, United States	25,000	Clay	(Ukraine) Anhelina Kalinina	3–6, 5–7
Win	11–11	Sep 2015	ITF Biarritz, France	100,000	Clay	(Switzerland) Romina Oprandi	7–5, 6–3
Loss	11–12	Sep 2015	ITF Saint-Malo, France	50,000	Clay	(Russia) Daria Kasatkina	5–7, 6–7^{(4–7)}
Loss	11–13	Jul 2018	ITF Versmold, Germany	60,000	Clay	(Serbia) Olga Danilović	7–5, 1–6, 3–6
Win	12–13	Aug 2018	ITF Bad Saulgau, Germany	25,000	Clay	(Romania) Alexandra Cadanțu	6–4, 6–2
Loss	12–14	Aug 2018	ITF Hechingen, Germany	60,000	Clay	(Georgia (country)) Ekaterine Gorgodze	2–6, 1–6
Win	13–14	Jun 2022	ITF Annenheim, Austria	25,000	Clay	(Germany) Lena Papadakis	6–3, 6–2
Win	14–14	Jun 2022	ITF Pörtschach, Austria	60,000	Clay	(Slovakia) Viktória Kužmová	6–2, 6–2

=== Doubles: 32 (20 titles, 12 runner-ups) ===
Legend $50,000 tournaments (2–4) $25,000 tournaments (14–6) $10,000 tournaments (4–2)	Finals by surface Hard (7–3) Clay (13–8) Carpet (0–1)

Result	W–L	Date	Tournament	Tier	Surface	Partner	Opponents	Score
Win	1–0	Jul 2005	ITF Darmstadt, Germany	25,000	Clay	(Germany) Vanessa Henke	(Russia) Vasilisa Bardina (Russia) Yaroslava Shvedova	6–4, 6–2
Loss	1–1	Jul 2005	ITF Garching, Germany	10,000	Clay	(Slovakia) Lenka Dlhopolcová	(Czech Republic) Zuzana Hejdová (Austria) Eva-Maria Hoch	6–4, 4–6, 3–6
Win	2–1	Jul 2006	ITF Les Contamines, France	25,000	Hard	(Portugal) Catarina Ferreira	(Australia) Christina Horiatopoulos (Belgium) Caroline Maes	6–4, 2–6, 7–5
Win	3–1	Aug 2006	ITF Wahlstedt, Germany	10,000	Clay	(Germany) Julia Görges	(Romania) Raluca Ciulei (Serbia) Neda Kozić	6–1, 6–3
Win	4–1	Oct 2006	ITF Lagos, Nigeria	25,000	Hard	(Romania) Magda Mihalache	(Italy) Lisa Sabino (Thailand) Montinee Tangphong	6–3, 6–3
Loss	4–2	Nov 2006	ITF Mallorca, Spain	10,000	Clay	(Slovenia) Anja Prislan	(Spain) Nuria Sánchez García (Portugal) Neuza Silva	3–6, 1–6
Win	5–2	Jun 2007	ITF Lenzerheide, Switzerland	10,000	Clay	(Austria) Eva-Maria Hoch	(Switzerland) Amra Sadiković (Germany) Paola Sprovieri	6–4, 6–3
Loss	5–3	Aug 2007	ITF Maribor, Slovenia	25,000	Clay	(Serbia) Ana Jovanović	(Croatia) Darija Jurak (Czech Republic) Michaela Paštiková	6–1, 4–6, 1–6
Win	6–3	Jun 2008	ITF Stuttgart, Germany	25,000	Clay	(Germany) Kristina Barrois	(Hungary) Katalin Marosi (Brazil) Marina Tavares	6–3, 6–4
Loss	6–4	Oct 2008	ITF Jounieh, Lebanon	50,000	Clay	(Germany) Carmen Klaschka	(Netherlands) Chayenne Ewijk (Belarus) Anastasiya Yakimova	5–7, 5–7
Loss	6–5	Nov 2008	ITF Ismaning, Germany	50,000	Carpet (i)	(Germany) Julia Görges	(Ukraine) Oxana Lyubtsova (Russia) Ksenia Pervak	2–6, 6–4, [7–10]
Win	7–5	Nov 2008	ITF Kolkata, India	50,000	Hard	(Romania) Ágnes Szatmári	(China) Lu Jingjing (China) Sun Shengnan	7–5, 6–3
Win	8–5	Nov 2008	ITF Saint-Denis, Réunion	25,000	Hard	(Germany) Carmen Klaschka	(South Africa) Surina De Beer (Belgium) Tamaryn Hendler	6–3, 6–1
Loss	8–6	Jan 2009	ITF Laguna Niguel, United States	25,000	Hard	(United States) Megan Moulton-Levy	(Germany) Vanessa Henke (Croatia) Darija Jurak	6–4, 3–6, [8–10]
Loss	8–7	Mar 2009	ITF Cairo, Egypt	25,000	Clay	(United States) Megan Moulton-Levy	(Hungary) Anikó Kapros (Hungary) Katalin Marosi	5–7, 3–6
Win	9–7	Jun 2009	ITF Montpellier, France	25,000	Clay	(Ukraine) Yuliya Beygelzimer	(Switzerland) Stefania Boffa (United States) Story Tweedie-Yates	6–4, 6–1
Win	10–7	Jun 2009	ITF Stuttgart, Germany	25,000	Clay	(Hungary) Katalin Marosi	(Netherlands) Leonie Mekel (Germany) Kathrin Wörle	7–6^{(7–2)}, 6–7^{(6–8)}, [10–4]
Win	11–7	Feb 2010	ITF Laguna Niguel, United States	25,000	Hard	(Russia) Anastasia Pivovarova	(United States) Amanda Fink (United States) Elizabeth Lumpkin	6–2, 6–3
Loss	11–8	Mar 2010	ITF Clearwater, United States	25,000	Hard	(Russia) Alina Jidkova	(China) Xu Yifan (China) Zhou Yimiao	4–6, 4–6
Win	12–8	May 2010	ITF Brno, Czech Republic	25,000	Clay	(Germany) Carmen Klaschka	(Belarus) Darya Kustova (Ukraine) Lesia Tsurenko	w/o
Win	13–8	Jun 2010	ITF Montpellier, France	25,000	Clay	(China) Lu Jingjing	(France) Amandine Hesse (Ukraine) Lyudmyla Kichenok	6–4, 6–2
Loss	13–9	Jun 2010	ITF Getxo, Spain	25,000	Clay	(China) Lu Jingjing	(Austria) Sandra Klemenschits (Slovenia) Andreja Klepač	0–6, 0–6
Win	14–9	Jul 2010	ITF Darmstadt, Germany	25,000	Clay	(Russia) Vitalia Diatchenko	(Romania) Irina-Camelia Begu (Japan) Erika Sema	4–6, 6–1, [10–4]
Loss	14–10	Oct 2010	ITF Troy, United States	50,000	Hard	(Russia) Alina Jidkova	(United States) Madison Brengle (United States) Asia Muhammad	2–6, 4–6
Loss	14–11	Aug 2011	ITF Hechingen, Germany	25,000	Clay	(Germany) Korina Perkovic	(Austria) Sandra Klemenschits (Germany) Tatjana Malek	6–4, 2–6, [7–10]
Win	15–11	Apr 2012	ITF Wiesbaden, Germany	10,000	Clay	(United States) Caitlin Whoriskey	(Russia) Alexandra Romanova (Poland) Sylwia Zagórska	6–0, 6–0
Win	16–11	Feb 2013	ITF Leimen, Germany	10,000	Hard (i)	(Germany) Carolin Daniels	(Germany) Antonia Lottner (Russia) Daria Salnikova	6–1, 6–4
Win	17–11	Jun 2013	ITF Stuttgart, Germany	25,000	Clay	(Germany) Kristina Barrois	(Liechtenstein) Stephanie Vogt (Poland) Sandra Zaniewska	7–6^{(7–1)}, 6–4
Win	18–11	Jun 2014	ITF Stuttgart, Germany	25,000	Clay	(Switzerland) Viktorija Golubic	(Netherlands) Lesley Kerkhove (Netherlands) Arantxa Rus	6–3, 6–3
Win	19–11	Nov 2014	ITF Sharm El Sheikh, Egypt	25,000	Hard	(Germany) Antonia Lottner	(Ukraine) Olga Ianchuk (Slovenia) Nastja Kolar	6–1, 6–1
Win	20–11	Jun 2015	ITF Brescia, Italy	50,000	Clay	(Czech Republic) Renata Voráčová	(Argentina) María Irigoyen (Liechtenstein) Stephanie Vogt	6–2, 6–1
Loss	20–12	Jun 2015	ITF Montpellier, France	50,000	Clay	(Czech Republic) Renata Voráčová	(Argentina) María Irigoyen (Czech Republic) Barbora Krejčíková	4–6, 2–6

== Wins over top-10 players ==
Siegemund has a 13–30 record against players who were, at the time the match was played, ranked in the top 10.

Season	2015	2016	2017	2018	2019	2020	2021	2022	2023	2024	2025	2026	Total
Wins	1	3	5	0	0	0	0	1	0	0	3	0	13

#	Player	Rk	Event	Surface	Rd	Score	Rk	Ref
2015
1.	(Switzerland) Timea Bacsinszky	10	Luxembourg Open	Hard (i)	1R	4–6, 6–4, ret.	101	
2016
2.	(Romania) Simona Halep	6	Stuttgart Open, Germany	Clay (i)	2R	6–1, 6–2	71	
3.	(Italy) Roberta Vinci	8	Stuttgart Open, Germany	Clay (i)	QF	6–1, 6–4	71	
4.	(Poland) Agnieszka Radwańska	2	Stuttgart Open, Germany	Clay (i)	SF	6–4, 6–2	71	
2017
5.	(United States) Venus Williams	10	Charleston Open, United States	Clay	2R	6–4, 6–7^{(3–7)}, 7–5	37	
6.	(Russia) Svetlana Kuznetsova	9	Stuttgart Open, Germany	Clay (i)	2R	6–4, 6–3	49	
7.	(Czech Republic) Karolína Plíšková	3	Stuttgart Open, Germany	Clay (i)	QF	7–6^{(7–3)}, 5–7, 6–3	49	
8.	(Romania) Simona Halep	5	Stuttgart Open, Germany	Clay (i)	SF	6–4, 7–5	49	
9.	(United Kingdom) Johanna Konta	6	Madrid Open, Spain	Clay	1R	3–6, 7–5, 6–4	30	
2022
10.	(Greece) Maria Sakkari	5	Stuttgart Open, Germany	Clay (i)	2R	6–4, 3–1 ret.	231	
2025
11.	(China) Zheng Qinwen	5	Australian Open, Australia	Hard	2R	7–6^{(7–3)}, 6–3	97	
12.	(United States) Madison Keys	8	Wimbledon, United Kingdom	Grass	3R	6–3, 6–3	104	
13.	Mirra Andreeva	5	Wuhan Open, China	Hard	2R	6–7^{(4–7)}, 6–3, 6–3	57	

== National participation ==
=== Team competitions finals: 1 (1 title) ===
Result	Date	Tournament	Surface	Team	Partners	Opponent team	Opponent players	Score
Win	Jan 2024	United Cup, Australia	Hard	Germany	Alexander Zverev; Angelique Kerber	Poland	Hubert Hurkacz; Iga Świątek	2–1

=== Billie Jean King Cup (5–8) ===
Group membership World Group / Finals (0–5) Play-offs / Qualifying round (5–3)	Matches by type Singles (4–3) Doubles (1–5)

Date	Venue	Surface	Rd	Opponent nation	Score	Match type	Opponent player(s)	W/L	Match score
2017
Feb 2017	Maui	Hard	1R	United States	0–4	Doubles (w/ C Witthöft)	B Mattek-Sands / S Rogers	Loss	1–4 ret.
Apr 2017	Stuttgart	Clay (i)	PO	Ukraine	3–2	Doubles (w/ C Witthöft)	N Kichenok / O Savchuk	Loss	4–6, 6–4, [6–10]
2019
Feb 2019	Braunschweig	Hard (i)	1R	Belarus	0–4	Singles	Aryna Sabalenka	Loss	1–6, 1–6
2020–21
Feb 2020	Florianópolis	Clay	QR	Brazil	4–0	Singles	Teliana Pereira	Win	6–3, 6–3
Feb 2020	Florianópolis	Clay	QR	Brazil	4–0	Singles	Gabriela Cé	Win	6–1, 6–2
2022
Apr 2022	Nur-Sultan	Clay (i)	QR	Kazakhstan	1–3	Singles	Elena Rybakina	Loss	0–6, 1–6
2023
Nov 2023	Seville	Hard (i)	RR	Italy	0–3	Doubles (w/ A-L Friedsam)	L Bronzetti / E Cocciaretto	Loss	4–6, 7–6^{(7–4)}, [9–11]
Nov 2023	Seville	Hard (i)	RR	France	0–3	Doubles (w/ J Niemeier)	C Garcia / K Mladenovic	Loss	7–5, 3–6, [1–10]
2024
Apr 2024	São Paulo	Clay (i)	QR	Brazil	3–1	Singles	Beatriz Haddad Maia	Win	6–4, 6–2
Apr 2024	São Paulo	Clay (i)	QR	Brazil	3–1	Singles	Carolina Alves	Win	6–1, 2–6, 6–3
Nov 2024	Málaga	Hard (i)	1R	Great Britain	0–2	Singles	Katie Boulter	Loss	1–6, 2–6
2025
Apr 2025	The Hague	Clay (i)	QR	Netherlands	0–3	Doubles (w/ A-L Friedsam)	S Lamens / D Schuurs	Loss	6–7^{(5–7)}, 5–7
Apr 2025	The Hague	Clay (i)	QR	Great Britain	1–2	Doubles (w/ A-L Friedsam)	H Dart / O Nicholls	Win	6–4, 6–1

=== United Cup (9–6) ===
Matches by type
Singles (1–4)
Mixed doubles (8–2)

Venue	Surface	Rd	Opponent nation	Score	Match type	Opponent player(s)	W/L	Match score
2023
Sydney	Hard	RR	Czech Republic	2–3	Singles	Petra Kvitová	Loss	4–6, 2–6
Sydney	Hard	RR	Czech Republic	2–3	Mixed doubles (w/ A Zverev)	M Bouzková / J Lehečka	Win	6–4, 7–6^{(7–1)}
Sydney	Hard	RR	United States	0–5	Singles	Jessica Pegula	Loss	3–6, 2–6
Sydney	Hard	RR	United States	0–5	Mixed doubles (w/ D Altmaier)	J Pegula / F Tiafoe	Loss	7–6^{(7–5)}, 4–6, [7–10]
2024
Sydney	Hard	QF	Greece	2–1	Mixed doubles (w/ A Zverev)	M Sakkari / Pe Tsitsipas	Win	6–3, 6–3
Sydney	Hard	SF	Australia	2–1	Mixed doubles (w/ A Zverev)	S Hunter / M Ebden	Win	7–6^{(7–2)}, 6–7^{(2–7)}, [15–13]
Sydney	Hard	W	Poland	2–1	Mixed doubles (w/ A Zverev)	I Świątek / H Hurkacz	Win	6–4, 5–7, [10–4]
2025
Perth	Hard	RR	Brazil	3–0	Singles	Beatriz Haddad Maia	Win	6–3, 1–6, 6–4
Perth	Hard	RR	Brazil	3–0	Mixed doubles (w/ T Pütz)	C Alves / R Matos	Win	7–6^{(10–8)}, 6–4
Perth	Hard	RR	China	2–1	Singles	Gao Xinyu	Loss	1–6, 6–3, 3–6
Perth	Hard	RR	China	2–1	Mixed doubles (w/ A Zverev)	S Zhang / Z Zhang	Win	6–2, 7–6^{(7–3)}
Perth	Hard	QF	Kazakhstan	1–2	Singles	Elena Rybakina	Loss	3–6, 1–6
Perth	Hard	QF	Kazakhstan	1–2	Mixed doubles (w/ T Pütz)	Z Kulambayeva / D Popko	Win	6–2, 6–2
2026
Sydney	Hard	RR	Netherlands	3–0	Mixed doubles (w/ A Zverev)	D Schuurs / T Griekspoor	Win	6–3, 6–2
Sydney	Hard	RR	Poland	0–3	Mixed doubles (w/ A Zverev)	K Kawa / J Zieliński	Loss	6–7^{(6–8)}, 3–6

=== Olympic Games (4–8) ===
Matches by type
Singles (3–3)
Doubles (0–3)
MIxed doubles (1–2)

Venue	Surface	Match type	Round	Opponent player(s)	W/L	Match score
2016
Rio de Janeiro	Hard	Singles	1R	(Bulgaria) Tsvetana Pironkova	Win	1–6, 6–4, 6–2
Rio de Janeiro	Hard	Singles	2R	(China) Zhang Shuai	Win	6–2, 6–4
Rio de Janeiro	Hard	Singles	3R	(Belgium) Kirsten Flipkens	Win	6–4, 6–3
Rio de Janeiro	Hard	Singles	QF	(Puerto Rico) Monica Puig	Loss	1–6, 1–6
Rio de Janeiro	Hard	Doubles (w/ A-L Grönefeld)	1R	(Russia) D Kasatkina / S Kuznetsova	Loss	1–6, 4–6
2021
Tokyo	Hard	Singles	1R	(Ukraine) Elina Svitolina	Loss	3–6, 7–5, 4–6
Tokyo	Hard	Doubles (w/ A-L Friedsam)	1R	(Russia) V Kudermetova / E Vesnina	Loss	2–6, 5–7
Tokyo	Hard	Mixed doubles (w/ K Krawietz)	1R	(United States) B Mattek-Sands / R Ram	Win	6–4, 5–7, [10–8]
Tokyo	Hard	Mixed doubles (w/ K Krawietz)	QF	(Serbia) N Stojanović / N Djokovic	Loss	1–6, 2–6
2024
Paris	Clay	Singles	1R	(United States) Danielle Collins	Loss	3–6, 0–2 ret.
Paris	Clay	Doubles (w/ A Kerber)	1R	(United Kingdom) K Boulter / H Watson	Loss	2–6, 3–6
Paris	Clay	Mixed doubles (w/ A Zverev)	1R	(Czech Republic) K Siniaková / T Macháč	Loss	4–6, 5–7
