= 2025 Japan Women's Open – Singles =

Singles
- 2025 Japan Women's Open

Final
- Champion: (Canada) Leylah Fernandez
- Runner-up: (Czech Republic) Tereza Valentová
- Score: 6–0, 5–7, 6–3

Details
- Draw: 32 (6 Q / 4 WC)
- Seeds: 8

Events
Singles	Doubles
← 2024 ·	Japan Women's Open	· 2026 →

Leylah Fernandez defeated Tereza Valentová in the final, 6–0, 5–7, 6–3 to win the singles title at the 2025 Japan Women's Open. It was her fifth WTA Tour singles title.

Suzan Lamens was the defending champion, but lost in the second round to Naomi Osaka.

== Seeds ==
1. (Japan) Naomi Osaka (quarterfinals, withdrew)
2. (Czech Republic) Linda Nosková (first round)
3. (Belgium) Elise Mertens (second round)
4. (Canada) Leylah Fernandez (champion)
5. (Czech Republic) Marie Bouzková (second round)
6. (Serbia) Olga Danilović (quarterfinals)
7. (United States) Ann Li (second round)
8. (Spain) Jéssica Bouzas Maneiro (second round)

== Draw ==
Key

- Q = Qualifier
- WC = Wild card
- LL = Lucky loser
- Alt = Alternate
- ITF = ITF entry
- PR = Protected ranking
- SR = Special ranking
- SE = Special exempt
- JE = Junior exempt
- JR = Junior Accelerator Programme entrant
- CO = College Accelerator Programme entrant
- NG = Next Gen Accelerator Program entrant
- w/o = Walkover
- r = Retired
- d = Defaulted

=== Finals ===
Semifinals
(Romania) Jaqueline Cristian	7^{7}	4	3
Q	(Czech Republic) Tereza Valentová	6^{3}	6	6
4	(Canada) Leylah Fernandez	6	2	6
(Romania) Sorana Cîrstea	1	6	4

Final
Q	(Czech Republic) Tereza Valentová	0	7	3
4	(Canada) Leylah Fernandez	6	5	6

=== Top half ===
First round
1	(Japan) N Osaka	6	6
WC	(Japan) W Sonobe	0	4
(Netherlands) S Lamens	6	6
(Colombia) E Arango	1	2
(Romania) J Cristian	6	7^{7}
Q	(Italy) E Cocciaretto	2	6^{4}
Q	(United States) K Volynets	2	4
8	(Spain) J Bouzas Maneiro	6	6
3	(Belgium) E Mertens	7^{7}	6
(Spain) C Bucșa	6^{5}	3
Q	(Czech Republic) T Valentová	6	6
(Philippines) A Eala	1	2
(Greece) M Sakkari	6	3	4
(United States) A Krueger	2	6	6
WC	(Japan) N Hibino	4	6	2
6	(Serbia) O Danilović	6	1	6

Second round
1	(Japan) N Osaka	7^{8}	3	6
(Netherlands) S Lamens	6^{6}	6	2
(Romania) J Cristian	0	6	6
8	(Spain) J Bouzas Maneiro	6	4	2
3	(Belgium) E Mertens	4	1
Q	(Czech Republic) T Valentová	6	6
(United States) A Krueger	4	4
6	(Serbia) O Danilović	6	6

Quarterfinals
1	(Japan) N Osaka
(Romania) J Cristian	w/o
Q	(Czech Republic) T Valentová	4	6	6
6	(Serbia) O Danilović	6	2	3

Semifinals
(Romania) J Cristian	7^{7}	4	3
Q	(Czech Republic) T Valentová	6^{3}	6	6

=== Bottom half ===
First round
7	(United States) A Li	6	6
Q	(France) V Gracheva	4	0
Q	(Chinese Taipei) J Garland	3	1
(Slovakia) R Šramková	6	6
Q	(Hungary) D Gálfi	6	6
(United States) A Parks	4	4
(United States) H Baptiste	2	5
4	(Canada) L Fernandez	6	7
5	(Czech Republic) M Bouzková	6	6
WC	(Japan) E Shibahara	1	1
(Switzerland) V Golubic	6	4	6
PR	(Canada) B Andreescu	3	6	4
(Romania) S Cîrstea	2	6	6
WC	(Japan) M Uchijima	6	4	2
(United Kingdom) K Boulter	7^{7}	6
2	(Czech Republic) L Nosková	6^{3}	3

Second round
7	(United States) A Li	2	6	3
(Slovakia) R Šramková	6	3	6
Q	(Hungary) D Gálfi	1	4
4	(Canada) L Fernandez	6	6
5	(Czech Republic) M Bouzková	6	2	6^{3}
(Switzerland) V Golubic	1	6	7^{7}
(Romania) S Cîrstea	6	6
(United Kingdom) K Boulter	3	1

Quarterfinals
(Slovakia) R Šramková	6^{2}	3
4	(Canada) L Fernandez	7^{7}	6
(Switzerland) V Golubic	2	6	2
(Romania) S Cîrstea	6	2	6

Semifinals
4	(Canada) L Fernandez	6	2	6
(Romania) S Cîrstea	1	6	4

== Qualifying ==
=== Seeds ===
1. (Czech Republic) Tereza Valentová (qualified)
2. (France) Varvara Gracheva (qualified)
3. (United States) Caty McNally (qualifying competition)
4. (Australia) Kimberly Birrell (qualifying competition)
5. (Italy) Elisabetta Cocciaretto (qualified)
6. (Hungary) Dalma Gálfi (qualified)
7. (United States) Katie Volynets (qualified)
8. (Romania) Elena-Gabriela Ruse (qualifying competition)
9. (Slovenia) Kaja Juvan (qualifying competition)
10. (Belgium) Greet Minnen (qualifying competition)
11. (United States) Taylor Townsend (qualifying competition)
12. (Chinese Taipei) Joanna Garland (qualified)

=== Qualifiers ===
1. (Czech Republic) Tereza Valentová
2. (France) Varvara Gracheva
3. (Chinese Taipei) Joanna Garland
4. (United States) Katie Volynets
5. (Italy) Elisabetta Cocciaretto
6. (Hungary) Dalma Gálfi

=== Qualifying draw ===
==== First qualifier ====
First round
1	(Czech Republic) Tereza Valentová	6	6
Alina Charaeva	1	2
WC	(Japan) Sara Saito	5	1
10	(Belgium) Greet Minnen	7	6

Qualifying competition
1	(Czech Republic) Tereza Valentová	4	6	6
10	(Belgium) Greet Minnen	6	4	2

==== Second qualifier ====
First round
2	(France) Varvara Gracheva	6	7
(Japan) Himeno Sakatsume	3	5
(Czech Republic) Dominika Šalková	7^{7}	0	1
8	(Romania) Elena-Gabriela Ruse	6^{3}	6	6

Qualifying competition
2	(France) Varvara Gracheva	7^{7}	6
8	(Romania) Elena-Gabriela Ruse	6^{2}	2

==== Third qualifier ====
First round
3	(United States) Caty McNally	6	6
(United States) Claire Liu	2	2
WC	(Japan) Ena Koike	3	7	1
12	(Chinese Taipei) Joanna Garland	6	5	6

Qualifying competition
3	(United States) Caty McNally	1	3
12	(Chinese Taipei) Joanna Garland	6	6

==== Fourth qualifier ====
First round
4	(Australia) Kimberly Birrell	6	7^{7}
(Japan) Mai Hontama	1	6^{5}
WC	(Japan) Hayu Kinoshita	4	4
7	(United States) Katie Volynets	6	6

Qualifying competition
4	(Australia) Kimberly Birrell	4	3
7	(United States) Katie Volynets	6	6

==== Fifth qualifier ====
First round
5	(Italy) Elisabetta Cocciaretto	6	6
(Australia) Maddison Inglis	1	4
(Australia) Astra Sharma	6	2	2
9	(Slovenia) Kaja Juvan	3	6	6

Qualifying competition
5	(Italy) Elisabetta Cocciaretto	7^{7}	6
9	(Slovenia) Kaja Juvan	6^{5}	2

==== Sixth qualifier ====
First round
6	(Hungary) Dalma Gálfi	6	7^{9}
(Japan) Kyōka Okamura	3	6^{7}
WC	(Japan) Mei Yamaguchi	7^{7}	3	6^{3}
11	(United States) Taylor Townsend	6^{4}	6	7^{7}

Qualifying competition
6	(Hungary) Dalma Gálfi	6	6
11	(United States) Taylor Townsend	1	3
