= 2025 Japan Women's Open – Doubles =

Doubles
- 2025 Japan Women's Open

Final
- Champions: (France) Kristina Mladenovic (United States) Taylor Townsend
- Runners-up: (Australia) Storm Hunter (United States) Desirae Krawczyk
- Score: 6–4, 2–6, [10–5]

Details
- Draw: 16
- Seeds: 4

Events
Singles	Doubles
← 2024 ·	Japan Women's Open	· 2026 →

Kristina Mladenovic and Taylor Townsend defeated Storm Hunter and Desirae Krawczyk in the final, 6–4, 2–6, [10–5] to win the doubles tennis title at the 2025 Japan Women's Open.

Ena Shibahara and Laura Siegemund were the reigning champions, but did not participate this year.

== Seeds ==
1. (Japan) Shuko Aoyama / (Spain) Cristina Bucșa (first round)
2. (France) Kristina Mladenovic / (United States) Taylor Townsend (champions)
3. (Japan) Miyu Kato / (Hungary) Fanny Stollár (first round)
4. (Mexico) Giuliana Olmos / (Indonesia) Aldila Sutjiadi (first round)

== Draw ==
=== Key ===
- Q = Qualifier
- WC = Wild card
- LL = Lucky loser
- Alt = Alternate
- ITF = ITF entry
- PR = Protected ranking
- SR = Special ranking
- SE = Special exempt
- JE = Junior exempt
- JR = Junior Accelerator Programme entrant
- CO = College Accelerator Programme entrant
- NG = Next Gen Accelerator Program entrant
- w/o = Walkover
- r = Retired
- d = Defaulted

=== Draw ===
First round
1	(Japan) S Aoyama (Spain) C Bucșa	5	6	[5]
(Japan) M Kobori (Japan) A Shimizu	7	3	[10]
(United States) A Li (United States) C McNally	6	6
(Japan) E Hozumi (Japan) M Uchijima	3	4
3	(Japan) M Kato (Hungary) F Stollár	3	5
(Australia) S Hunter (United States) D Krawczyk	6	7
WC	(Japan) H Kinoshita (Japan) W Sonobe	1	4
WC	(Japan) N Kawaguchi (Japan) S Saito	6	6
(Japan) N Hibino (Poland) K Piter	3	4
(Romania) J Cristian (Serbia) O Danilović	6	6
(Ukraine) N Kichenok (Japan) M Ninomiya	6	7
4	(Mexico) G Olmos (Indonesia) A Sutjiadi	1	5
A Blinkova (Italy) E Cocciaretto	1	0^{r}
(United States) A Krueger (Romania) E-G Ruse	6	0
(United States) Q Gleason (United States) S Santamaria	1	1
2	(France) K Mladenovic (United States) T Townsend	6	6

Quarterfinals
(Japan) M Kobori (Japan) A Shimizu	4	2
(United States) A Li (United States) C McNally	6	6
(Australia) S Hunter (United States) D Krawczyk	3	6	[10]
WC	(Japan) N Kawaguchi (Japan) S Saito	6	2	[8]
(Romania) J Cristian (Serbia) O Danilović	5	7	[6]
(Ukraine) N Kichenok (Japan) M Ninomiya	7	5	[10]
(United States) A Krueger (Romania) E-G Ruse
2	(France) K Mladenovic (United States) T Townsend	w/o

Semifinals
(United States) A Li (United States) C McNally
(Australia) S Hunter (United States) D Krawczyk	w/o
(Ukraine) N Kichenok (Japan) M Ninomiya	5	4
2	(France) K Mladenovic (United States) T Townsend	7	6

Final
(Australia) S Hunter (United States) D Krawczyk	4	6	[5]
2	(France) K Mladenovic (United States) T Townsend	6	2	[10]
