= 2024 Japan Women's Open =

- Date: 14–20 October
- Edition: 13th
- Category: WTA 250
- Draw: 32S / 16D
- Surface: Hard
- Location: Osaka, Japan
- Venue: Utsubo Tennis Center

Champions

Singles
- (Netherlands) Suzan Lamens

Doubles
- (Japan) Ena Shibahara / (Germany) Laura Siegemund
← 2023 ·	Japan Women's Open	· 2025 →

The 2024 Japan Women's Open (also known as the Kinoshita Group Japan Open for sponsorship purposes) was a women's tennis tournament played on outdoor hard courts. It was the thirteenth edition of the Japan Women's Open, and part of the WTA 250 tournaments of the 2024 WTA Tour. It was held at the Utsubo Tennis Center in Osaka, Japan, from 14 to 20 October 2024.

== Champions ==
=== Singles ===
- (Netherlands) Suzan Lamens def. (Australia) Kimberly Birrell 6–0, 6–4

=== Doubles ===
- (Japan) Ena Shibahara / (Germany) Laura Siegemund def. (Spain) Cristina Bucșa / (Romania) Monica Niculescu 3–6, 6–2, [10–2]

== Singles main-draw entrants ==
=== Seeds ===
Country	Player	Rank^{1}	Seed
~~POL~~	~~Magdalena Fręch~~	~~27~~	~~1~~
~~CAN~~	~~Leylah Fernandez~~	~~28~~	~~2~~
BEL	Elise Mertens	30	3
CZE	Marie Bouzková	42	4
ARM	Elina Avanesyan	47	5
BUL	Viktoriya Tomova	48	6
FRA	Diane Parry	50	7
ITA	Elisabetta Cocciaretto	54	8

- Rankings are as of 7 October 2024

=== Other entrants ===
The following players received wildcards into the singles main draw:

- (Canada) Bianca Andreescu
- (Japan) Mai Hontama
- (United States) Sofia Kenin
- (Japan) Sara Saito

The following player received entry using a protected ranking:

- (China) Zheng Saisai

The following players received entry from the qualifying draw:

- (Australia) Kimberly Birrell
- (Romania) Ana Bogdan
- (Japan) Aoi Ito
- (Netherlands) Suzan Lamens
- (Japan) Ena Shibahara
- (Germany) Laura Siegemund

The following player received entry as lucky losers:

- (Germany) Eva Lys
- (France) Jessika Ponchet

=== Withdrawals ===
- (Canada) Bianca Andreescu → replaced by (Belgium) Greet Minnen (Note: Withdrew from the entry list (using protected ranking) and received wildcard.)
- (United States) Amanda Anisimova → replaced by (United States) Ashlyn Krueger
- (France) Clara Burel → replaced by (United Kingdom) Harriet Dart
- (Canada) Leylah Fernandez → replaced by (France) Jessika Ponchet
- (Poland) Magdalena Fręch → replaced by (Germany) Eva Lys
- (France) Varvara Gracheva → replaced by (Italy) Lucia Bronzetti
- (New Zealand) Lulu Sun → replaced by Erika Andreeva
- (China) Wang Xinyu → replaced by (Spain) Cristina Bucșa

== Doubles main-draw entrants ==
=== Seeds ===
Country	Player	Country	Player	Rank^{1}	Seed
CAN	Gabriela Dabrowski	NZL	Erin Routliffe	5	1
USA	Sofia Kenin	USA	Bethanie Mattek-Sands	47	2
JPN	Ena Shibahara	GER	Laura Siegemund	49	3
ESP	Cristina Bucșa	ROU	Monica Niculescu	61	4

- ^{1} Rankings are as of 7 October 2024

=== Other entrants ===
The following teams received wildcards into the doubles main draw:

- (Japan) Nao Hibino / (Japan) Makoto Ninomiya
- (Japan) Mai Hontama / (Japan) Moyuka Uchijima

The following pair received entry as alternates:

- (Serbia) Aleksandra Krunić / (Bulgaria) Viktoriya Tomova

=== Withdrawals ===
- (United States) Ashlyn Krueger / (United States) Asia Muhammad → replaced by (Serbia) Aleksandra Krunić / (Bulgaria) Viktoriya Tomova
