= 2008 ITF Kolkata Open – Singles =

Singles
- 2008 ITF Kolkata Open

Final
- Champion: (Japan) Ayumi Morita
- Runner-up: (Romania) Elora Dabija
- Score: 6–3, 6–1

Events
Singles	Doubles
ITF Kolkata Open

Maria Kirilenko was the defending champion, but chose not to participate.

Ayumi Morita won the title, defeating Elora Dabija in the final, 6–3, 6–1.

== Seeds ==
1. (United Kingdom) Melanie South (second round)
2. (Japan) Ayumi Morita (champion)
3. (Chinese Taipei) Chan Chin-wei (first round)
4. (Romania) Ágnes Szatmári (second round)
5. (United States) Sunitha Rao (second round)
6. (Romania) Liana Ungur (first round)
7. (Kyrgyzstan) Ksenia Palkina (quarterfinals)
8. (Chinese Taipei) Chang Kai-chen (quarterfinals)

== Main draw ==
=== Key ===
- Q = Qualifier
- WC = Wild card
- LL = Lucky loser
- Alt = Alternate
- SE = Special exempt
- PR = Protected ranking
- ITF = ITF entry
- JE = Junior exempt
- w/o = Walkover
- r = Retired
- d = Defaulted
- SR = Special ranking

=== Finals ===
Semifinals
(Romania) Elora Dabija	6	7^{7}
(Australia) Sophie Ferguson	2	6^{4}
Q	(Serbia) Bojana Jovanovski	1	3
2	(Japan) Ayumi Morita	6	6

Final
(Romania) Elora Dabija	3	1
2	(Japan) Ayumi Morita	6	6

=== Top half ===
First round
1	(United Kingdom) M South	7	6
(China) J Lu	5	3
(Thailand) N Lertcheewakarn	6	6
(Russia) J Parasyuk	4	2
(Germany) A Roesch	7^{7}	2	2
(Romania) E Dabija	6^{5}	6	6
(Netherlands) L Mekel	6
6	(Romania) L Ungur	3	r
4	(Romania) Á Szatmári	6	6
WC	(India) S Burman	1	1
(Brazil) V Segnini	4	5
(Australia) S Ferguson	6	7
(Israel) J Glushko	6	6
Q	(Italy) S Disderi	2	3
WC	(India) S Uberoi	2	3
7	(Kyrgyzstan) K Palkina	6	6

Second round
1	(United Kingdom) M South	6	3	4
(Thailand) N Lertcheewakarn	2	6	6
(Romania) E Dabija	2	6	6
(Netherlands) L Mekel	6	4	4
4	(Romania) Á Szatmári	6^{5}	4
(Australia) S Ferguson	7^{7}	6
(Israel) J Glushko	5	5
7	(Kyrgyzstan) K Palkina	7	7

Quarterfinals
(Thailand) N Lertcheewakarn	6	6^{5}	5
(Romania) E Dabija	3	7^{7}	7
(Australia) S Ferguson	0	6	6
7	(Kyrgyzstan) K Palkina	6	1	4

Semifinals
(Romania) E Dabija	6	7^{7}
(Australia) S Ferguson	2	6^{4}

=== Bottom half ===
First round
8	(Chinese Taipei) K-c Chang	6	6
(India) A Bhambri	2	2
(Thailand) S Viratprasert	6	6
WC	(India) R Chakravarthi	4	1
(Chinese Taipei) C-j Chuang	6	6
(Chinese Taipei) I-h Hwang	1	2
Q	(Serbia) B Jovanovski	6	6
3	(Chinese Taipei) C-w Chan	1	2
5	(United States) S Rao	6	6
(United States) A Prousis	0	2
Q	(France) F Haring	5	4
Q	(United Kingdom) E Webley-Smith	7	6
WC	(India) S Bhambri	6	7
(India) I Lakhani	4	5
(Germany) L Siegemund	1	2
2	(Japan) A Morita	6	6

Second round
8	(Chinese Taipei) K-c Chang	6	6
(Thailand) S Viratprasert	0	2
(Chinese Taipei) C-j Chuang	3	3
Q	(Serbia) B Jovanovski	6	6
5	(United States) S Rao	2	1
Q	(United Kingdom) E Webley-Smith	6	6
WC	(India) S Bhambri	3	1
2	(Japan) A Morita	6	6

Quarterfinals
8	(Chinese Taipei) K-c Chang	4	7	6^{2}
Q	(Serbia) B Jovanovski	6	5	7^{7}
Q	(United Kingdom) E Webley-Smith	2	2
2	(Japan) A Morita	6	6

Semifinals
Q	(Serbia) B Jovanovski	1	3
2	(Japan) A Morita	6	6
