= 2024 Japan Women's Open – Singles =

Singles
- 2024 Japan Women's Open

Final
- Champion: (Netherlands) Suzan Lamens
- Runner-up: (Australia) Kimberly Birrell
- Score: 6–0, 6–4

Details
- Draw: 32
- Seeds: 8

Events
Singles	Doubles
← 2023 ·	Japan Women's Open	· 2025 →

Suzan Lamens defeated Kimberly Birrell in the final, 6–0, 6–4 to win the singles title at the 2024 Japan Women's Open. It was her first WTA Tour title. This was the first WTA Tour final since the 2022 Copa Colsanitas and fifth in the tour's history to be contested by two qualifiers.

Ashlyn Krueger was the defending champion, but lost in the first round to Elina Avanesyan.

== Seeds ==
1. (Poland) Magdalena Fręch (withdrew)
2. (Canada) Leylah Fernandez (withdrew)
3. (Belgium) Elise Mertens (second round, retired)
4. (Czech Republic) Marie Bouzková (second round)
5. (Armenia) Elina Avanesyan (second round)
6. (Bulgaria) Viktoriya Tomova (first round)
7. (France) Diane Parry (semifinals)
8. (Italy) Elisabetta Cocciaretto (second round)

== Draw ==
=== Key ===
- Q = Qualifier
- WC = Wild card
- LL = Lucky loser
- Alt = Alternate
- ITF = ITF entry
- PR = Protected ranking
- SR = Special ranking
- SE = Special exempt
- JE = Junior exempt
- JR = Junior Accelerator Programme entrant
- CO = College Accelerator Programme entrant
- NG = Next Gen Accelerator Program entrant
- w/o = Walkover
- r = Retired
- d = Defaulted

=== Finals ===
Semifinals
Q	(Japan) Aoi Ito	4	3
Q	(Australia) Kimberly Birrell	6	6
Q	(Netherlands) Suzan Lamens	6	6
7	(France) Diane Parry	2	4

Final
Q	(Australia) Kimberly Birrell	0	4
Q	(Netherlands) Suzan Lamens	6	6

=== Top half ===
First round
LL	(Germany) E Lys	6	6
(Colombia) C Osorio	2	3
(United States) M Kessler	6	6
Q	(Japan) E Shibahara	4	1
WC	(United States) S Kenin	2	6	5
Q	(Japan) A Ito	6	3	7
LL	(France) J Ponchet	4	7	6^{3}
8	(Italy) E Cocciaretto	6	5	7^{7}
3	(Belgium) E Mertens	6	6
WC	(Japan) M Hontama	1	1
Q	(Australia) K Birrell	6	6
PR	(China) S Zheng	2	3
(Spain) J Bouzas Maneiro	3	2
WC	(Japan) S Saito	6	6
(United States) A Krueger	6^{1}	3
5	(Armenia) E Avanesyan	7^{7}	6

Second round
LL	(Germany) E Lys	7^{9}	3	7
(United States) M Kessler	6^{7}	6	5
Q	(Japan) A Ito	6	6
8	(Italy) E Cocciaretto	4	3
3	(Belgium) E Mertens	6	5	1^{r}
Q	(Australia) K Birrell	3	7	4
WC	(Japan) S Saito	7^{7}	6
5	(Armenia) E Avanesyan	6^{2}	4

Quarterfinals
LL	(Germany) E Lys	7^{10}	2	3
Q	(Japan) A Ito	6^{8}	6	6
Q	(Australia) K Birrell	7	6
WC	(Japan) S Saito	5	4

Semifinals
Q	(Japan) A Ito	4	3
Q	(Australia) K Birrell	6	6

=== Bottom half ===
First round
6	(Bulgaria) V Tomova	1	2
Q	(Netherlands) S Lamens	6	6
(Italy) L Bronzetti	6	6
(Spain) C Bucșa	3	4
Q	(Romania) A Bogdan	6	6
V Kudermetova	2	2
(Japan) M Uchijima	6^{6}	6	3
4	(Czech Republic) M Bouzková	7^{8}	2	6
7	(France) D Parry	4	7^{7}	6
E Andreeva	6	6^{4}	1
WC	(Canada) B Andreescu	3	0
(Belgium) G Minnen	6	6
Q	(Germany) L Siegemund	6	5	5
(United Kingdom) H Dart	3	7	7
(Denmark) C Tauson	6	6
(United States) K Volynets	1	4

Second round
Q	(Netherlands) S Lamens	6	6
(Italy) L Bronzetti	3	4
Q	(Romania) A Bogdan	6	7^{7}
4	(Czech Republic) M Bouzková	0	6^{5}
7	(France) D Parry	6	6
(Belgium) G Minnen	4	2
(United Kingdom) H Dart	3	2
(Denmark) C Tauson	6	6

Quarterfinals
Q	(Netherlands) S Lamens	4	6	6
Q	(Romania) A Bogdan	6	3	3
7	(France) D Parry	6	1	6
(Denmark) C Tauson	3	6	3

Semifinals
Q	(Netherlands) S Lamens	6	6
7	(France) D Parry	2	4

== Qualifying ==
=== Seeds ===
1. (Germany) Laura Siegemund (qualified)
2. (Germany) Eva Lys (qualifying competition, lucky loser)
3. (France) Jessika Ponchet (qualifying competition, lucky loser)
4. (United States) Emina Bektas (first round)
5. (Croatia) Jana Fett (first round)
6. (Romania) Ana Bogdan (qualified)
7. (United States) Alycia Parks (first round)
8. (Netherlands) Suzan Lamens (qualified)
9. (Australia) Kimberly Birrell (qualified)
10. (Japan) Nao Hibino (qualifying competition)
11. (Japan) Ena Shibahara (qualified)
12. (Netherlands) Arianne Hartono (qualifying competition)

=== Qualifiers ===
1. (Germany) Laura Siegemund
2. (Netherlands) Suzan Lamens
3. (Australia) Kimberly Birrell
4. (Japan) Aoi Ito
5. (Japan) Ena Shibahara
6. (Romania) Ana Bogdan

=== Lucky losers ===
1. (France) Jessika Ponchet
2. (Germany) Eva Lys

=== Qualifying draw ===
==== First qualifier ====
First round
1	(Germany) Laura Siegemund	7	6
WC	(Japan) Rina Saigo	5	2
(Thailand) Mananchaya Sawangkaew	6	5	3
10	(Japan) Nao Hibino	3	7	6

Qualifying competition
1	(Germany) Laura Siegemund	6	6
10	(Japan) Nao Hibino	1	4

==== Second qualifier ====
First round
2	(Germany) Eva Lys	6	6
WC	(Japan) Himeno Sakatsume	2	2
WC	(Japan) Ena Koike	6^{6}	1
8	(Netherlands) Suzan Lamens	7^{8}	6

Qualifying competition
2	(Germany) Eva Lys	5	3
8	(Netherlands) Suzan Lamens	7	6

==== Third qualifier ====
First round
3	(France) Jessika Ponchet	6	6
PR	(China) Wang Qiang	3	3
(Japan) Sayaka Ishii	2	6	3
9	(Australia) Kimberly Birrell	6	3	6

Qualifying competition
3	(France) Jessika Ponchet	5	6	2
9	(Australia) Kimberly Birrell	7	3	6

==== Fourth qualifier ====
First round
4	(United States) Emina Bektas	3	4
(Japan) Aoi Ito	6	6
(Turkey) Zeynep Sönmez	6^{3}	6	4
12	(Netherlands) Arianne Hartono	7^{7}	1	6

Qualifying competition
(Japan) Aoi Ito	3	6	6
12	(Netherlands) Arianne Hartono	6	3	4

==== Fifth qualifier ====
First round
5	(Croatia) Jana Fett	6^{3}	2
(Canada) Marina Stakusic	7^{7}	6
(Czech Republic) Linda Fruhvirtová	6	6^{4}	5
11	(Japan) Ena Shibahara	3	7^{7}	7

Qualifying competition
(Canada) Marina Stakusic	6	6^{2}	6^{7}
11	(Japan) Ena Shibahara	2	7^{7}	7^{9}

==== Sixth qualifier ====
First round
6	(Romania) Ana Bogdan	6	6
Alt	(Serbia) Aleksandra Krunić	1	2
WC	(Japan) Naho Sato	4	6	6
7	(United States) Alycia Parks	6	4	2

Qualifying competition
6	(Romania) Ana Bogdan	6	6
WC	(Japan) Naho Sato	3	3
