= 2008 ITF Kolkata Open =

- Date: 17–23 November
- Edition: 4th
- Category: ITF Women's Circuit
- Prize money: $50,000
- Surface: Hard (indoor)
- Location: Kolkata; India

Champions

Singles
- (Japan) Ayumi Morita

Doubles
- (Germany) Laura Siegemund / (Romania) Ágnes Szatmári
- ITF Kolkata Open

The 2008 ITF Kolkata Open was a professional tennis tournament played on indoor hard courts. It was the fourth edition of the tournament which is part of the 2008 ITF Women's Circuit, offering a total of $50,000 in prize money. It took place in Kolkata, India, on 17–23 November 2008.

== Results ==
=== Singles ===
- (Japan) Ayumi Morita def. (Romania) Elora Dabija, 6–3, 6–1

=== Doubles ===
- (Germany) Laura Siegemund / (Romania) Ágnes Szatmári def. (China) Lu Jingjing / (China) Sun Shengnan, 7–5, 6–3
