= 2023 Japan Women's Open – Doubles =

Doubles
- 2023 Japan Women's Open

Final
- Champions: (Germany) Anna-Lena Friedsam (Ukraine) Nadiia Kichenok
- Runners-up: Anna Kalinskaya (Kazakhstan) Yulia Putintseva
- Score: 7–6^{(7–3)}, 6–3

Details
- Draw: 16
- Seeds: 4

Events
Singles	Doubles
← 2019 ·	Japan Women's Open	· 2024 →

Anna-Lena Friedsam and Nadiia Kichenok defeated Anna Kalinskaya and Yulia Putintseva in the final, 7–6^{(7–3)}, 6–3 to win the doubles title at the 2023 Japan Women's Open. Both teams saved match points en route to the final: Friedsam and Kichenok saved three in their first-round match against Alicia Barnett and Olivia Nicholls, while Kalinskaya and Putintseva saved two in their first-round match against Yuki Naito and Moyuka Uchijima.

Misaki Doi and Nao Hibino were the defending champions from when the tournament was last held in 2019, but Doi chose not to compete in doubles this year. Hibino partnered Mai Hontama, but lost in the quarterfinals to Eri Hozumi and Makoto Ninomiya.

== Seeds ==
1. (Chinese Taipei) Latisha Chan / (China) Zhu Lin (first round)
2. (Japan) Eri Hozumi / (Japan) Makoto Ninomiya (semifinals)
3. (United Kingdom) Naiktha Bains / (United Kingdom) Maia Lumsden (quarterfinals)
4. (United Kingdom) Alicia Barnett / (United Kingdom) Olivia Nicholls (first round)

== Draw ==
=== Key ===
- Q = Qualifier
- WC = Wild card
- LL = Lucky loser
- Alt = Alternate
- SE = Special exempt
- PR = Protected ranking
- ITF = ITF entry
- JE = Junior exempt
- w/o = Walkover
- r = Retired
- d = Defaulted
- SR = Special ranking

=== Draw ===
First round
1	(Chinese Taipei) L Chan (China) L Zhu	3	3
(Georgia (country)) N Dzalamidze; S Lansere	6	6
(Mexico) F Contreras (Greece) D Papamichail	6	5	[15]
(Czech Republic) L Fruhvirtová; D Shnaider	4	7	[13]
4	(United Kingdom) A Barnett (United Kingdom) O Nicholls	2	6	[9]
(Germany) A-L Friedsam (Ukraine) N Kichenok	6	3	[11]
(Switzerland) V Golubic (Hungary) P Udvardy	4	4
WC	(Japan) N Kawaguchi (Japan) M Kobori	6	6
WC	(Japan) Y Naito (Japan) M Uchijima	6	3	[10]
A Kalinskaya (Kazakhstan) Y Putintseva	2	6	[12]
(France) D Parry (Argentina) N Podoroska	4	6^{2}
3	(United Kingdom) N Bains (United Kingdom) M Lumsden	6	7^{7}
(Netherlands) A Hartono (Netherlands) B Schoofs	6	2	[0]
(Japan) N Hibino (Japan) M Hontama	4	6	[10]
(South Korea) N-l Han (South Korea) S-j Jang	3	2
2	(Japan) E Hozumi (Japan) M Ninomiya	6	6

Quarterfinals
(Georgia (country)) N Dzalamidze; S Lansere	2	5
(Mexico) F Contreras (Greece) D Papamichail	6	7
(Germany) A-L Friedsam (Ukraine) N Kichenok	6	6
WC	(Japan) N Kawaguchi (Japan) M Kobori	4	3
A Kalinskaya (Kazakhstan) Y Putintseva	6	6
3	(United Kingdom) N Bains (United Kingdom) M Lumsden	1	4
(Japan) N Hibino (Japan) M Hontama	2	2
2	(Japan) E Hozumi (Japan) M Ninomiya	6	6

Semifinals
(Mexico) F Contreras (Greece) D Papamichail	6^{6}	3
(Germany) A-L Friedsam (Ukraine) N Kichenok	7^{8}	6
A Kalinskaya (Kazakhstan) Y Putintseva	6^{3}	7^{7}	[10]
2	(Japan) E Hozumi (Japan) M Ninomiya	7^{7}	6^{1}	[7]

Final
(Germany) A-L Friedsam (Ukraine) N Kichenok	7^{7}	6
A Kalinskaya (Kazakhstan) Y Putintseva	6^{3}	3
