= 2025 Japan Women's Open =

- Date: 13–19 October
- Edition: 14th
- Category: WTA 250
- Draw: 32S / 16D
- Surface: Hard
- Location: Osaka, Japan
- Venue: Utsubo Tennis Center

Champions

Singles
- (Canada) Leylah Fernandez

Doubles
- (France) Kristina Mladenovic / (United States) Taylor Townsend
| ← 2024 · | Japan Women's Open | · 2026 → |

The 2025 Kinoshita Group Japan Open was a women's tennis tournament played on outdoor hard courts. It was the 14th edition of the Japan Women's Open, and part of the WTA 250 tournaments of the 2025 WTA Tour. It was held at the Utsubo Tennis Center in Osaka, Japan, from 13 to 19 October 2025.

== Champions ==
=== Singles ===
- (Canada) Leylah Fernandez def. (Czech Republic) Tereza Valentová, 6–0, 5–7, 6–3

=== Doubles ===
- (France) Kristina Mladenovic / (United States) Taylor Townsend def. (Australia) Storm Hunter / (United States) Desirae Krawczyk, 6–4, 2–6, [10–5]

== Singles main-draw entrants ==
=== Seeds ===
| Country | Player | Rank^{1} | Seed |
|---|---|---|---|
| JPN | Naomi Osaka | 16 | 1 |
| CZE | Linda Nosková | 17 | 2 |
| BEL | Elise Mertens | 21 | 3 |
| CAN | Leylah Fernandez | 27 | 4 |
| CZE | Marie Bouzková | 41 | 5 |
| SRB | Olga Danilović | 42 | 6 |
| USA | Ann Li | 46 | 7 |
| ESP | Jéssica Bouzas Maneiro | 47 | 8 |

- Rankings are as of 6 October 2025

=== Other entrants ===
The following players received wildcards into the singles main draw:

- (Japan) Nao Hibino
- (Japan) Ena Shibahara
- (Japan) Wakana Sonobe
- (Japan) Moyuka Uchijima

The following player received entry using a protected ranking:

- (Canada) Bianca Andreescu

The following players received entry from the qualifying draw:

- (Italy) Elisabetta Cocciaretto
- (Hungary) Dalma Gálfi
- (Chinese Taipei) Joanna Garland
- (France) Varvara Gracheva
- (Czech Republic) Tereza Valentová
- (United States) Katie Volynets

=== Withdrawals ===
- (France) Loïs Boisson → replaced by (Romania) Sorana Cîrstea
- (United States) Iva Jovic → replaced by (Canada) Bianca Andreescu
- (United States) Peyton Stearns → replaced by (Netherlands) Suzan Lamens

== Doubles main-draw entrants ==
=== Seeds ===
| Country | Player | Country | Player | Rank^{1} | Seed |
|---|---|---|---|---|---|
| JPN | Shuko Aoyama | ESP | Cristina Bucșa | 64 | 1 |
| FRA | Kristina Mladenovic | USA | Taylor Townsend | 65 | 2 |
| JPN | Miyu Kato | HUN | Fanny Stollár | 74 | 3 |
| MEX | Giuliana Olmos | INA | Aldila Sutjiadi | 93 | 4 |

- ^{1} Rankings are as of 6 October 2025

=== Other entrants ===
The following teams received wildcards into the doubles main draw:

- (Japan) Natsumi Kawaguchi / (Japan) Sara Saito
- (Japan) Hayu Kinoshita / (Japan) Wakana Sonobe
