= 2022 Carinthian Ladies Lake's Trophy – Doubles =

Doubles
- 2022 Carinthian Ladies Lake's Trophy

Final
- Champions: (United States) Jessie Aney (Czech Republic) Anna Sisková
- Runners-up: (Switzerland) Jenny Dürst (Poland) Weronika Falkowska
- Score: 6–3, 6–4

Events
Singles	Doubles
Carinthian Ladies Lake's Trophy	· 2023 →

This was the first edition of the tournament.

Jessie Aney and Anna Sisková won the title, defeating Jenny Dürst and Weronika Falkowska in the final, 6–3, 6–4.

== Seeds ==
1. (Hungary) Tímea Babos / (Hungary) Panna Udvardy (first round)
2. Alena Fomina-Klotz / (Slovenia) Dalila Jakupović (semifinals, withdrew)
3. (United States) Jessie Aney / (Czech Republic) Anna Sisková (champions)
4. (United States) Robin Montgomery / (Burundi) Sada Nahimana (first round, withdrew)

== Draw ==
=== Key ===
- Q = Qualifier
- WC = Wild card
- LL = Lucky loser
- Alt = Alternate
- SE = Special exempt
- PR = Protected ranking
- ITF = ITF entry
- JE = Junior exempt
- w/o = Walkover
- r = Retired
- d = Defaulted
- SR = Special ranking

=== Draw ===
First round
1	(Hungary) T Babos (Hungary) P Udvardy	2	7	[3]
(Japan) N Hanatani (Japan) K Morisaki	6	5	[10]
(Italy) N Fossa Huergo (Latvia) D Marcinkēviča	6	5	[6]
(Switzerland) J Dürst (Poland) W Falkowska	2	7	[10]
4	(United States) R Montgomery (Burundi) S Nahimana
(Colombia) M Herazo González (Colombia) MP Pérez	w/o
(Austria) M Klaffner (Austria) S Kraus	7^{7}	6
(Czech Republic) M Bayerlová (Germany) S Herrmann	6^{3}	3
(Croatia) L Bošković (North Macedonia) L Gjorcheska	6	6
(United States) C Chavatipon (Bulgaria) D Evtimova	4	4
(Italy) A Moratelli (Romania) LI Paar	2	1
(Germany) L Papadakis (Slovenia) N Radišić	6	6
WC	(Austria) S Kanduth (Ukraine) M Kostiuk	2	1
2	A Fomina-Klotz (Slovenia) D Jakupović	6	6

Quarterfinals
(Japan) N Hanatani (Japan) K Morisaki	6	4	[8]
(Switzerland) J Dürst (Poland) W Falkowska	4	6	[10]
(Colombia) M Herazo González (Colombia) MP Pérez	7	3	[4]
(Austria) M Klaffner (Austria) S Kraus	5	6	[10]
(Croatia) L Bošković (North Macedonia) L Gjorcheska	6	2	[2]
3	(United States) J Aney (Czech Republic) A Sisková	3	6	[10]
(Germany) L Papadakis (Slovenia) N Radišić	7	3	[8]
2	A Fomina-Klotz (Slovenia) D Jakupović	5	6	[10]

Semifinals
(Switzerland) J Dürst (Poland) W Falkowska	7^{7}	6
(Austria) M Klaffner (Austria) S Kraus	6^{1}	1
3	(United States) J Aney (Czech Republic) A Sisková	w/o
2	A Fomina-Klotz (Slovenia) D Jakupović

Final
(Switzerland) J Dürst (Poland) W Falkowska	3	4
3	(United States) J Aney (Czech Republic) A Sisková	6	6
