= 2022 Carinthian Ladies Lake's Trophy =

Tennis tournament

- Date: 6–12 June 2022
- Edition: 1st
- Category: ITF Women's World Tennis Tour
- Prize money: $60,000
- Surface: Clay / Outdoor
- Location: Pörtschach am Wörthersee, Austria

Champions

Singles
- (Germany) Laura Siegemund

Doubles
- (United States) Jessie Aney / (Czech Republic) Anna Sisková
| Carinthian Ladies Lake's Trophy | · 2023 → |

The 2022 Carinthian Ladies Lake's Trophy was a professional tennis tournament played on outdoor clay courts. It was the first edition of the tournament which was part of the 2022 ITF Women's World Tennis Tour. It took place in Pörtschach am Wörthersee, Austria between 6 and 12 June 2022.

== Champions ==
=== Singles ===
- (Germany) Laura Siegemund def. (Slovakia) Viktória Kužmová, 6–2, 6–2

=== Doubles ===
- (United States) Jessie Aney / (Czech Republic) Anna Sisková def. (Switzerland) Jenny Dürst / (Poland) Weronika Falkowska, 6–3, 6–4

== Singles main draw entrants ==
=== Seeds ===
| Country | Player | Rank^{1} | Seed |
|---|---|---|---|
| HUN | Panna Udvardy | 90 | 1 |
| SUI | Stefanie Vögele | 186 | 2 |
| SVK | Viktória Kužmová | 189 | 3 |
| TUR | İpek Öz | 192 | 4 |
| CHI | Bárbara Gatica | 208 | 5 |
| GER | Eva Lys | 229 | 6 |
| CRO | Tena Lukas | 241 | 7 |
| HUN | Tímea Babos | 251 | 8 |

- ^{1} Rankings are as of 23 May 2022.

=== Other entrants ===
The following players received wildcards into the singles main draw:

- (Austria) Elena Karner
- (Austria) Melanie Klaffner
- (Austria) Sinja Kraus
- (Austria) Mavie Österreicher

The following player received entry into the singles main draw using a protected ranking:

- (Romania) Laura Ioana Paar

The following player received entry into the singles main draw as a special exempt:

- (Germany) Lena Papadakis

The following players received entry from the qualifying draw:

- (Czech Republic) Michaela Bayerlová
- (Poland) Weronika Falkowska
- (Colombia) María Herazo González
- (United States) Robin Montgomery
- (Italy) Angelica Moratelli
- (Slovenia) Nina Potočnik
- Ekaterina Reyngold
- (Argentina) Julia Riera

The following players received entry as lucky losers:

- (Italy) Nicole Fossa Huergo
- (Slovenia) Nika Radišić
