= 2023 Japan Women's Open – Singles =

Singles
- 2023 Japan Women's Open

Final
- Champion: (United States) Ashlyn Krueger
- Runner-up: (China) Zhu Lin
- Score: 6–3, 7–6^{(8–6)}

Details
- Draw: 32
- Seeds: 8

Events
Singles	Doubles
← 2019 ·	Japan Women's Open	· 2024 →

Ashlyn Krueger defeated Zhu Lin in the final, 6–3, 7–6^{(8–6)} to win the singles title at the 2023 Japan Women's Open. It was her first WTA Tour title.

Nao Hibino was the defending champion from when the tournament was last held in 2019, but lost in the first round to Rebecca Marino.

== Seeds ==
1. (China) Zhu Lin (final)
2. (Germany) Tatjana Maria (first round)
3. (China) Wang Xinyu (semifinals)
4. (Czech Republic) Linda Fruhvirtová (first round)
5. (Argentina) Nadia Podoroska (second round)
6. (Kazakhstan) Yulia Putintseva (quarterfinals)
7. (Japan) Nao Hibino (first round)
8. (Ukraine) Kateryna Baindl (first round)

== Draw ==
=== Key ===
- Q = Qualifier
- WC = Wild card
- LL = Lucky loser
- Alt = Alternate
- SE = Special exempt
- PR = Protected ranking
- ITF = ITF entry
- JE = Junior exempt
- w/o = Walkover
- r = Retired
- d = Defaulted
- SR = Special ranking

=== Finals ===
Semifinals
1	(China) Zhu Lin	7	7^{8}
3	(China) Wang Xinyu	5	6^{6}
(United States) Ashlyn Krueger	6	6
WC	(Japan) Mai Hontama	3	3

Final
1	(China) Zhu Lin	3	6^{6}
(United States) Ashlyn Krueger	6	7^{8}

=== Top half ===
First round
1	(China) L Zhu	6	6
(China) Xiy Wang	4	4
WC	(Japan) M Uchijima	6	6
Q	(India) A Raina	4	2
Q	(United States) E Mandlik	7	6
(France) D Parry	5	2
(Canada) R Marino	6	6
7	(Japan) N Hibino	3	4
3	(China) Xin Wang	7^{7}	6
(Switzerland) J Teichmann	6^{3}	3
Q	(Japan) H Sakatsume	6	6
Q	(Philippines) A Eala	0	3
Q	V Savinykh	6	1	6
(Germany) A-L Friedsam	4	6	3
D Shnaider	2	3
6	(Kazakhstan) Y Putintseva	6	6

Second round
1	(China) L Zhu	6	4	6
WC	(Japan) M Uchijima	4	6	1
Q	(United States) E Mandlik	7	3	6
(Canada) R Marino	5	6	1
3	(China) Xin Wang	6	6
Q	(Japan) H Sakatsume	4	2
Q	V Savinykh	1	2
6	(Kazakhstan) Y Putintseva	6	6

Quarterfinals
1	(China) L Zhu	6	6
Q	(United States) E Mandlik	3	2
3	(China) Xin Wang	7^{7}	6^{1}	6
6	(Kazakhstan) Y Putintseva	6^{4}	7^{7}	3

Semifinals
1	(China) L Zhu	7	7^{8}
3	(China) Xin Wang	5	6^{6}

=== Bottom half ===
First round
8	(Ukraine) K Baindl	2	3
(United States) A Krueger	6	6
(Switzerland) V Golubic	4	2
(France) J Ponchet	6	6
(Germany) J Niemeier	4	4
A Kalinskaya	6	6
(United Kingdom) H Dart	7	5	6
4	(Czech Republic) L Fruhvirtová	5	7	2
5	(Argentina) N Podoroska	6	3	7
(China) Y Yuan	4	6	5
WC	(Japan) M Hontama	7	0	6
(South Korea) S-j Jang	5	6	2
Q	(Netherlands) A Hartono	6	3	6
WC	(Japan) M Doi	2	6	3
(Hungary) P Udvardy	2	6	7^{7}
2	(Germany) T Maria	6	4	6^{5}

Second round
(United States) A Krueger	6	6
(France) J Ponchet	4	1
A Kalinskaya	7^{7}	6
(United Kingdom) H Dart	6^{5}	2
5	(Argentina) N Podoroska	3	3
WC	(Japan) M Hontama	6	6
Q	(Netherlands) A Hartono	6	6
(Hungary) P Udvardy	2	0

Quarterfinals
(United States) A Krueger	6	6
A Kalinskaya	3	1
WC	(Japan) M Hontama	6^{2}	6	6
Q	(Netherlands) A Hartono	7^{7}	4	1

Semifinals
(United States) A Krueger	6	6
WC	(Japan) M Hontama	3	3

== Qualifying ==
=== Seeds ===
1. (United States) Elizabeth Mandlik (qualified)
2. Valeria Savinykh (qualified)
3. (India) Ankita Raina (qualified)
4. (Greece) Despina Papamichail (qualifying competition)
5. (Philippines) Alexandra Eala (qualified)
6. (Japan) Himeno Sakatsume (qualified)
7. (Netherlands) Arianne Hartono (qualified)
8. (China) You Xiaodi (first round, retired)
9. (Hong Kong) Eudice Chong (qualifying competition)
10. (Japan) Haruka Kaji (qualifying competition)
11. (Japan) Sakura Hosogi (first round)
12. (South Korea) Han Na-lae (first round)

=== Qualifiers ===
1. (United States) Elizabeth Mandlik
2. Valeria Savinykh
3. (India) Ankita Raina
4. (Netherlands) Arianne Hartono
5. (Philippines) Alexandra Eala
6. (Japan) Himeno Sakatsume

=== Qualifying draw ===
==== First qualifier ====
First round
1	(United States) Elizabeth Mandlik	2	6	6
(Chinese Taipei) Yang Ya-yi	6	3	2
(Japan) Kyōka Okamura	4	6	2
10	(Japan) Haruka Kaji	6	4	6

Qualifying competition
1	(United States) Elizabeth Mandlik	6	6
10	(Japan) Haruka Kaji	1	2

==== Second qualifier ====
First round
2	Valeria Savinykh	7^{8}	6
WC	(Japan) Aoi Ito	6^{6}	1
(Canada) Carol Zhao	7	6
12	(South Korea) Han Na-lae	5	2

Qualifying competition
2	Valeria Savinykh	6	6
(Canada) Carol Zhao	3	2

==== Third qualifier ====
First round
3	(India) Ankita Raina	6	7
WC	(Japan) Yuki Naito	3	5
(Ukraine) Kateryna Volodko	6	6
11	(Japan) Sakura Hosogi	3	1

Qualifying competition
3	(India) Ankita Raina	2
(Ukraine) Kateryna Volodko	1^{r}

==== Fourth qualifier ====
First round
4	(Greece) Despina Papamichail	6	6^{4}	6
(United Kingdom) Naiktha Bains	4	7^{7}	0
Sofya Lansere	4	6	2
7	(Netherlands) Arianne Hartono	6	3	6

Qualifying competition
4	(Greece) Despina Papamichail	1	5
7	(Netherlands) Arianne Hartono	6	7

==== Fifth qualifier ====
First round
5	(Philippines) Alexandra Eala	6	6
(Mexico) Fernanda Contreras	3	4
(South Korea) Park So-hyun	6	5
8	(China) You Xiaodi	3	1^{r}

Qualifying competition
5	(Philippines) Alexandra Eala	4	6	7
(South Korea) Park So-hyun	6	1	5

==== Sixth qualifier ====
First round
6	(Japan) Himeno Sakatsume	6	6
WC	(Japan) Natsumi Kawaguchi	3	3
WC	(Japan) Momoko Kobori	4	6^{8}
9	(Hong Kong) Eudice Chong	6	7^{10}

Qualifying competition
6	(Japan) Himeno Sakatsume	6	5	6
9	(Hong Kong) Eudice Chong	3	7	0
