= 2026 Japan Women's Open – Singles =

Singles
- 2026 Japan Women's Open

Final
- Champion: (Czech Republic) Kateřina Siniaková
- Runner-up: (United States) Ashlyn Krueger
- Score: 6–1, 6–0
- Date: 25 October 2026

Details
- Draw: 32 (6Q / 4WC)
- Seeds: 8

Events
Singles	Doubles
- Japan Women's Open

At the 2026 Japan Women's Open, Kateřina Siniaková defeated Ashlyn Krueger in the final, 6–1, 6–0 to win the women's singles tennis title. The tournament took place on outdoor hard courts in Osaka, Japan, and was a WTA 250-level event. It was the first singles title for Siniaková since Nanchang in 2023, and sixth WTA Tour singles title overall.

Leylah Fernandez was the reigning champion, but chose to compete in Ningbo instead.

== Seeds ==
1. (United States) Ann Li (semifinals)
2. (United States) Peyton Stearns (first round, retired)
3. (Australia) Kimberly Birrell (withdrew)
4. (Australia) Talia Gibson (quarterfinals)
5. Liudmila Samsonova (first round)
6. (Indonesia) Janice Tjen (first round)
7. (Ukraine) Oleksandra Oliynykova (first round)
8. (United Kingdom) Katie Boulter (semifinals)

== Draw ==
Key

- Q = Qualifier
- WC = Wild card
- LL = Lucky loser
- Alt = Alternate
- ITF = ITF entry
- PR = Protected ranking
- SR = Special ranking
- SE = Special exempt
- JE = Junior exempt
- JR = Junior Accelerator Programme entrant
- CO = College Accelerator Programme entrant
- NG = Next Gen Accelerator Program entrant
- w/o = Walkover
- r = Retired
- d = Defaulted

=== Finals ===
Semifinals
1	(United States) Ann Li	4	7^{7}	3
(United States) Ashlyn Krueger	6	6^{4}	6
8	(United Kingdom) Katie Boulter	1	4
(Czech Republic) Kateřina Siniaková	6	6

Final
(United States) Ashlyn Krueger	1	0
(Czech Republic) Kateřina Siniaková	6	6

=== Top half ===
First round
1	(United States) A Li	5	6	6
Q	(Australia) E Jones	7	0	3
Q	(Australia) M Joint	6	4	3
(Turkey) Z Sönmez	4	6	6
(Czech Republic) T Valentová	6	1	6
(China) S Zhang	2	6	4
(Austria) L Tagger	6	6
5	L Samsonova	3	3
4	(Australia) T Gibson	7	7^{8}
Q	(United Kingdom) H Dart	5	6^{6}
(United States) C McNally	4	1^{r}
Q	(Austria) S Kraus	6	3
(Thailand) L Tararudee	7	6
(Spain) K Quevedo	5	3
(United States) A Krueger	6	6
6	(Indonesia) J Tjen	4	4

Second round
1	(United States) A Li	6	6
(Turkey) Z Sönmez	3	1
(Czech Republic) T Valentová	5	3
(Austria) L Tagger	7	6
4	(Australia) T Gibson	6	6
Q	(Austria) S Kraus	2	1
(Thailand) L Tararudee	3	1
(United States) A Krueger	6	6

Quarterfinals
1	(United States) A Li	6	3	7^{7}
(Austria) L Tagger	4	6	6^{0}
4	(Australia) T Gibson	1	3
(United States) A Krueger	6	6

Semifinals
1	(United States) A Li	4	7^{7}	3
(United States) A Krueger	6	6^{4}	6

=== Bottom half ===
First round
8	(United Kingdom) K Boulter	6	6
WC	(Japan) H Sakatsume	3	1
(Switzerland) V Golubic	6	6
WC	(Japan) M Hontama	3	1
(Spain) P Badosa	6	4	3
(Croatia) A Ružić	3	6	6
LL	(United States) K Day	6	6
LL	(United States) S Kenin	3	2
7	(Ukraine) O Oliynykova	2	3
Q	(United States) M Stoiana	6	6
WC	(Japan) M Uchijima	6	6^{7}	6
WC	(Japan) E Shibahara	4	7^{9}	3
Q	(United States) C Liu	4	3
(Poland) M Linette	6	6
(Czech Republic) K Siniaková	6	0	4
2	(United States) P Stearns	4	6	0^{r}

Second round
8	(United Kingdom) K Boulter	6	6
(Switzerland) V Golubic	2	1
(Croatia) A Ružić	6	0
LL	(United States) K Day	4	0^{r}
Q	(United States) M Stoiana	6	2	6
WC	(Japan) M Uchijima	2	6	3
(Poland) M Linette	4	1
(Czech Republic) K Siniaková	6	6

Quarterfinals
8	(United Kingdom) K Boulter	3	6	6
(Croatia) A Ružić	6	3	3
Q	(United States) M Stoiana	1	2
(Czech Republic) K Siniaková	6	6

Semifinals
8	(United Kingdom) K Boulter	1	4
(Czech Republic) K Siniaková	6	6

== Qualifying ==
=== Seeds ===
1. (Austria) Sinja Kraus (qualified)
2. (Australia) Taylah Preston (qualifying competition, retired)
3. (Australia) Maya Joint (qualified)
4. (United States) Claire Liu (qualified)
5. (United Kingdom) Harriet Dart (qualified)
6. (United States) Mary Stoiana (qualified)
7. (United States) Kayla Day (qualifying competition, lucky loser)
8. (Australia) Emerson Jones (qualified)
9. (United States) Sofia Kenin (qualifying competition, lucky loser)
10. (Australia) Maddison Inglis (qualifying competition)
11. (Armenia) Elina Avanesyan (first round, retired)
12. (Italy) Tyra Caterina Grant (first round)

=== Qualifiers ===
1. (Austria) Sinja Kraus
2. (Australia) Emerson Jones
3. (Australia) Maya Joint
4. (United States) Claire Liu
5. (United Kingdom) Harriet Dart
6. (United States) Mary Stoiana

=== Lucky losers ===
1. (United States) Kayla Day
2. (United States) Sofia Kenin

=== Qualifying draw ===
==== First qualifier ====
First round
1	(Austria) Sinja Kraus	6	3	6
WC	(Japan) Momoko Kobori	1	6	2
(Japan) Mei Yamaguchi	6	0	1
9	(United States) Sofia Kenin	2	6	6

Qualifying competition
1	(Austria) Sinja Kraus	7^{7}	6
9	(United States) Sofia Kenin	6^{4}	4

==== Second qualifier ====
First round
2	(Australia) Taylah Preston	3
(Japan) Haruka Kaji	1^{r}
PR	(United Kingdom) Heather Watson	3	3
8	(Australia) Emerson Jones	6	6

Qualifying competition
2	(Australia) Taylah Preston	0	0^{r}
8	(Australia) Emerson Jones	6	0

==== Third qualifier ====
First round
3	(Australia) Maya Joint	6	6
(Japan) Kyōka Okamura	4	2
(Japan) Ena Koike	5	3
7	(United States) Kayla Day	7	6

Qualifying competition
3	(Australia) Maya Joint	6	3	6
7	(United States) Kayla Day	3	6	3

==== Fourth qualifier ====
First round
4	(United States) Claire Liu	6	6
WC	(Japan) Kanon Sawashiro	1	1
PR	(Spain) Sara Sorribes Tormo	5	4
10	(Australia) Maddison Inglis	7	6

Qualifying competition
4	(United States) Claire Liu	6	6
10	(Australia) Maddison Inglis	4	3

==== Fifth qualifier ====
First round
5	(United Kingdom) Harriet Dart	6	6
(Japan) Rina Saigo	3	1
(Japan) Aoi Ito	6	6
12	(Italy) Tyra Caterina Grant	3	4

Qualifying competition
5	(United Kingdom) Harriet Dart	6	6^{6}	6
(Japan) Aoi Ito	3	7^{8}	3

==== Sixth qualifier ====
First round
6	(United States) Mary Stoiana	6	7^{7}
WC	(Japan) Rinko Matsuda	3	6^{1}
(Japan) Sayaka Ishii	6	0
11	(Armenia) Elina Avanesyan	3	0^{r}

Qualifying competition
6	(United States) Mary Stoiana	6	7
(Japan) Sayaka Ishii	4	5
