= 2022 Carinthian Ladies Lake's Trophy – Singles =

Singles
- 2022 Carinthian Ladies Lake's Trophy

Final
- Champion: (Germany) Laura Siegemund
- Runner-up: (Slovakia) Viktória Kužmová
- Score: 6–2, 6–2

Events
Singles	Doubles
Carinthian Ladies Lake's Trophy	· 2023 →

This was the first edition of the tournament.

Laura Siegemund won the title, defeating Viktória Kužmová in the final, 6–2, 6–2.

== Seeds ==
1. (Hungary) Panna Udvardy (quarterfinals)
2. (Switzerland) Stefanie Vögele (semifinals)
3. (Slovakia) Viktória Kužmová (final)
4. (Turkey) İpek Öz (first round, retired)
5. (Chile) Bárbara Gatica (withdrew)
6. (Germany) Eva Lys (second round)
7. (Croatia) Tena Lukas (second round)
8. (Hungary) Tímea Babos (second round)

== Draw ==
=== Key ===
- Q = Qualifier
- WC = Wild card
- LL = Lucky loser
- Alt = Alternate
- SE = Special exempt
- PR = Protected ranking
- ITF = ITF entry
- JE = Junior exempt
- w/o = Walkover
- r = Retired
- d = Defaulted
- SR = Special ranking

=== Finals ===
Semifinals
(Slovenia) Dalila Jakupović
3	(Slovakia) Viktória Kužmová	w/o
(Germany) Laura Siegemund	6	6
2	(Switzerland) Stefanie Vögele	2	1

Final
3	(Slovakia) Viktória Kužmová	2	2
(Germany) Laura Siegemund	6	6

=== Top half ===
First round
1	(Hungary) P Udvardy	6	6
Q	(Italy) A Moratelli	0	4
Q	E Reyngold	1	1
LL	(Slovenia) N Radišić	6	6
(Slovenia) D Jakupović	6	6
WC	(Austria) E Karner	2	2
PR	(Romania) LI Paar	2	2
8	(Hungary) T Babos	6	6
3	(Slovakia) V Kužmová	7^{7}	6
Q	(United States) R Montgomery	6^{1}	1
(Czech Republic) T Smitková	3	3
Q	(Poland) W Falkowska	6	6
Q	(Slovenia) N Potočnik	3	0
(North Macedonia) L Gjorcheska	6	6
WC	(Austria) M Klaffner	3	3
6	(Germany) E Lys	6	6

Second round
1	(Hungary) P Udvardy	6	6
LL	(Slovenia) N Radišić	4	4
(Slovenia) D Jakupović	6	5	6
8	(Hungary) T Babos	1	7	3
3	(Slovakia) V Kužmová	3	6	6
Q	(Poland) W Falkowska	6	4	2
(North Macedonia) L Gjorcheska	0	6	6
6	(Germany) E Lys	6	4	4

Quarterfinals
1	(Hungary) P Udvardy	4	6	4
(Slovenia) D Jakupović	6	3	6
3	(Slovakia) V Kužmová	1	7	6
(North Macedonia) L Gjorcheska	6	5	3

Semifinals
(Slovenia) D Jakupović
3	(Slovakia) V Kužmová	w/o

=== Bottom half ===
First round
7	(Croatia) T Lukas	6	6
(Czech Republic) A Sisková	0	2
WC	(Austria) M Österreicher	3	2
(Germany) L Siegemund	6	6
(Burundi) S Nahimana	2	4
SE	(Germany) L Papadakis	6	6
(Austria) B Haas	6	4
4	(Turkey) İ Öz	2	0^{r}
Q	(Argentina) J Riera	2	1^{r}
WC	(Austria) S Kraus	6	1
LL	(Italy) N Fossa Huergo	4	7^{8}	5
Q	(Czech Republic) M Bayerlová	6	6^{6}	7
(Croatia) L Bošković	6	6
Q	(Colombia) M Herazo González	1	2
(Latvia) D Marcinkēviča	3	4
2	(Switzerland) S Vögele	6	6

Second round
7	(Croatia) T Lukas	3	3
(Germany) L Siegemund	6	6
SE	(Germany) L Papadakis	6	1	1
(Austria) B Haas	3	6	6
WC	(Austria) S Kraus	4	6	7
Q	(Czech Republic) M Bayerlová	6	2	5
(Croatia) L Bošković	7^{7}	1	2
2	(Switzerland) S Vögele	6^{5}	6	6

Quarterfinals
(Germany) L Siegemund	2	6	7
(Austria) B Haas	6	4	5
WC	(Austria) S Kraus	6^{6}	0
2	(Switzerland) S Vögele	7^{8}	6

Semifinals
(Germany) L Siegemund	6	6
2	(Switzerland) S Vögele	2	1
