= 2016 Porsche Tennis Grand Prix – Singles =

Singles
- 2016 Porsche Tennis Grand Prix

Final
- Champion: (Germany) Angelique Kerber
- Runner-up: (Germany) Laura Siegemund
- Score: 6–4, 6–0

Events
Singles	Doubles
- Porsche Tennis Grand Prix

Angelique Kerber was the defending champion and successfully retained her title, defeating Laura Siegemund in the final, 6–4, 6–0.

== Seeds ==
The top four seeds received a bye into the second round.

1. (Poland) Agnieszka Radwańska (semifinals)
2. (Germany) Angelique Kerber (champion)
3. (Spain) Garbiñe Muguruza (quarterfinals)
4. (Romania) Simona Halep (second round)
5. (Czech Republic) Petra Kvitová (semifinals)
6. (Italy) Roberta Vinci (quarterfinals)
7. (Spain) Carla Suárez Navarro (quarterfinals)
8. (Czech Republic) Lucie Šafářová (first round)

== Draw ==
Key

- Q = Qualifier
- WC = Wild card
- LL = Lucky loser
- Alt = Alternate
- ITF = ITF entry
- PR = Protected ranking
- SR = Special ranking
- SE = Special exempt
- JE = Junior exempt
- JR = Junior Accelerator Programme entrant
- CO = College Accelerator Programme entrant
- NG = Next Gen Accelerator Program entrant
- w/o = Walkover
- r = Retired
- d = Defaulted

=== Finals ===
Semifinals
1	(Poland) Agnieszka Radwańska	4	2
Q	(Germany) Laura Siegemund	6	6
5	(Czech Republic) Petra Kvitová	4	6	2
2	(Germany) Angelique Kerber	6	4	6

Final
Q	(Germany) Laura Siegemund	4	0
2	(Germany) Angelique Kerber	6	6

=== Top half ===
First round
(Germany) A Petkovic	6	6
(France) K Mladenovic	2	4
Q	(Germany) C Witthöft	6^{3}	0
(Serbia) A Ivanovic	7^{7}	6
(Czech Republic) Ka Plíšková	7^{7}	4	7
8	(Czech Republic) L Šafářová	6^{4}	6	5
Q	(Germany) L Siegemund	6	7
(Russia) A Pavlyuchenkova	0	5
WC	(Germany) J Görges	6	6
(France) A Cornet	4	0
(Russia) E Makarova	6^{3}	6	4
6	(Italy) R Vinci	7^{7}	4	6

Second round
1	(Poland) A Radwańska	1	6	6
(Germany) A Petkovic	6	1	2
(Serbia) A Ivanovic	4	2
(Czech Republic) Ka Plíšková	6	6
4	(Romania) S Halep	1	2
Q	(Germany) L Siegemund	6	6
WC	(Germany) J Görges	3	4
6	(Italy) R Vinci	6	6

Quarterfinals
1	(Poland) A Radwańska	6	7^{10}
(Czech Republic) Ka Plíšková	2	6^{8}
Q	(Germany) L Siegemund	6	6
6	(Italy) R Vinci	1	4

Semifinals
1	(Poland) A Radwańska	4	2
Q	(Germany) L Siegemund	6	6

=== Bottom half ===
First round
5	(Czech Republic) P Kvitová	6	6
Q	(United States) L Chirico	0	0
(Romania) M Niculescu	6	6
(France) C Garcia	2	2
(Germany) S Lisicki	6^{4}	3
(Hungary) T Babos	7^{7}	6
7	(Spain) C Suárez Navarro	6	6
Q	(France) O Dodin	3	0
WC	(Germany) A-L Friedsam	6	6
(United Kingdom) J Konta	3	3
LL	(Italy) C Giorgi	4	2
(Germany) A Beck	6	6

Second round
5	(Czech Republic) P Kvitová	2	7^{7}	6
(Romania) M Niculescu	6	6^{5}	2
(Hungary) T Babos	2	2
3	(Spain) G Muguruza	6	6
7	(Spain) C Suárez Navarro	6	6
WC	(Germany) A-L Friedsam	2	2
(Germany) A Beck	6	3	1
2	(Germany) A Kerber	4	6	6

Quarterfinals
5	(Czech Republic) P Kvitová	6	3	6
3	(Spain) G Muguruza	1	6	0
7	(Spain) C Suárez Navarro	2	4
2	(Germany) A Kerber	6	6

Semifinals
5	(Czech Republic) P Kvitová	4	6	2
2	(Germany) A Kerber	6	4	6

== Qualifying ==
=== Seeds ===
1. (Italy) Camila Giorgi (qualifying competition, lucky loser)
2. (United States) Madison Brengle (first round)
3. (Germany) Laura Siegemund (qualified)
4. (Croatia) Ana Konjuh (qualifying competition)
5. (Germany) Carina Witthöft (qualified)
6. (Czech Republic) Kristýna Plíšková (qualifying competition)
7. (Slovenia) Polona Hercog (qualifying competition)
8. (Japan) Naomi Osaka (first round)

=== Qualifiers ===
1. (United States) Louisa Chirico
2. (France) Océane Dodin
3. (Germany) Laura Siegemund
4. (Germany) Carina Witthöft

=== Lucky loser ===
1. (Italy) Camila Giorgi

=== Draw ===
==== First qualifier ====
First round
1	(Italy) Camila Giorgi	6	6
WC	(Germany) Katharina Hobgarski	3	4
(Estonia) Kaia Kanepi	6	6
(France) Virginie Razzano	4	4
(Czech Republic) Barbora Krejčíková	4	5
(United States) Louisa Chirico	6	7
(Slovakia) Daniela Hantuchová	6	7
8	(Japan) Naomi Osaka	2	5

Second round
1	(Italy) Camila Giorgi	6	6
(Estonia) Kaia Kanepi	4	2
(United States) Louisa Chirico	6	6
(Slovakia) Daniela Hantuchová	2	4

Qualifying competition
1	(Italy) Camila Giorgi	3	3
(United States) Louisa Chirico	6	6

==== Second qualifier ====
First round
2	(United States) Madison Brengle	4	1
(France) Océane Dodin	6	6
PR	(United Kingdom) Laura Robson	6	6
(Czech Republic) Klára Koukalová	2	3
(Croatia) Tena Lukas	7^{7}	6^{2}	5
(India) Ankita Raina	6^{4}	7^{7}	7
(Bulgaria) Isabella Shinikova	4	2
6	(Czech Republic) Kristýna Plíšková	6	6

Second round
(France) Océane Dodin	6	6
PR	(United Kingdom) Laura Robson	2	2
(India) Ankita Raina	1	0
6	(Czech Republic) Kristýna Plíšková	6	6

Qualifying competition
(France) Océane Dodin	6	6
6	(Czech Republic) Kristýna Plíšková	3	3

==== Third qualifier ====
First round
3	(Germany) Laura Siegemund	6	6
(Czech Republic) Tereza Smitková	1	4
(Bulgaria) Aleksandrina Naydenova	3	2
(Bulgaria) Sesil Karatantcheva	6	6
WC	(Germany) Antonia Lottner	6	6
WC	(Germany) Lena Rüffer	3	2
(Czech Republic) Kateřina Siniaková	6	5	2
7	(Slovenia) Polona Hercog	3	7	6

Second round
3	(Germany) Laura Siegemund	6	7
(Bulgaria) Sesil Karatantcheva	3	5
WC	(Germany) Antonia Lottner	6	4	1
7	(Slovenia) Polona Hercog	4	6	6

Qualifying competition
3	(Germany) Laura Siegemund	6	6
7	(Slovenia) Polona Hercog	4	3

==== Fourth qualifier ====
First round
4	(Croatia) Ana Konjuh	6	4	7^{7}
(Spain) Georgina García Pérez	2	6	6^{5}
(Netherlands) Lesley Kerkhove	6	3	0
(Romania) Patricia Maria Țig	4	6	6
WC	(Germany) Katharina Gerlach	6	6
(France) Amandine Hesse	4	2
(Russia) Evgeniya Rodina	2	0
5	(Germany) Carina Witthöft	6	6

Second round
4	(Croatia) Ana Konjuh	6	2	6
(Romania) Patricia Maria Țig	4	6	2
WC	(Germany) Katharina Gerlach	0	5
5	(Germany) Carina Witthöft	6	7

Qualifying competition
4	(Croatia) Ana Konjuh	3	4
5	(Germany) Carina Witthöft	6	6
