= 2024 Japan Women's Open – Doubles =

Doubles
- 2024 Japan Women's Open

Final
- Champions: (Japan) Ena Shibahara (Germany) Laura Siegemund
- Runners-up: (Spain) Cristina Bucșa (Romania) Monica Niculescu
- Score: 3–6, 6–2, [10–2]

Details
- Draw: 16
- Seeds: 4

Events
Singles	Doubles
← 2023 ·	Japan Women's Open	· 2025 →

Ena Shibahara and Laura Siegemund defeated Cristina Bucșa and Monica Niculescu in the final, 3–6, 6–2, [10–2] to win the doubles tennis title at the 2024 Japan Women's Open.

Anna-Lena Friedsam and Nadiia Kichenok were the reigning champions, but Friedsam did not participate this year. Kichenok partnered Miyu Kato, but lost in the first round to Nao Hibino and Makoto Ninomiya.

== Seeds ==
1. (Canada) Gabriela Dabrowski / (New Zealand) Erin Routliffe (semifinals, withdrew)
2. (United States) Sofia Kenin / (United States) Bethanie Mattek-Sands (first round)
3. (Japan) Ena Shibahara / (Germany) Laura Siegemund (champions)
4. (Spain) Cristina Bucșa / (Romania) Monica Niculescu (final)

== Draw ==
=== Key ===
- Q = Qualifier
- WC = Wild card
- LL = Lucky loser
- Alt = Alternate
- ITF = ITF entry
- PR = Protected ranking
- SR = Special ranking
- SE = Special exempt
- JE = Junior exempt
- JR = Junior Accelerator Programme entrant
- CO = College Accelerator Programme entrant
- NG = Next Gen Accelerator Program entrant
- w/o = Walkover
- r = Retired
- d = Defaulted

=== Draw ===
First round
1	(Canada) G Dabrowski (New Zealand) E Routliffe	6	6
(Thailand) P Plipuech (Chinese Taipei) C-y Tsao	4	3
(Japan) S Aoyama (Japan) E Hozumi	6	6
WC	(Japan) M Hontama (Japan) M Uchijima	3	4
4	(Spain) C Bucșa (Romania) M Niculescu	6	6
(Hungary) T Babos (United Kingdom) H Dart	4	4
Alt	(Serbia) A Krunić (Bulgaria) V Tomova	6	2	[11]
(Czech Republic) M Bouzková (Colombia) C Osorio	3	6	[13]
(United States) S Santamaria (China) Q Tang	3	7^{7}	[10]
(Poland) K Piter (Hungary) F Stollár	6	6^{4}	[8]
(United Kingdom) S Murray Sharan (United Kingdom) E Silva	3	6	[4]
3	(Japan) E Shibahara (Germany) L Siegemund	6	2	[10]
WC	(Japan) N Hibino (Japan) M Ninomiya	6	7^{7}
(Japan) M Kato (Ukraine) N Kichenok	2	6^{3}
(Italy) A Moratelli (Czech Republic) A Sisková	6	6
2	(United States) S Kenin (United States) B Mattek-Sands	1	2

Quarterfinals
1	(Canada) G Dabrowski (New Zealand) E Routliffe	6	6
(Japan) S Aoyama (Japan) E Hozumi	2	4
4	(Spain) C Bucșa (Romania) M Niculescu	w/o
(Czech Republic) M Bouzková (Colombia) C Osorio
(United States) S Santamaria (China) Q Tang	6	3	[7]
3	(Japan) E Shibahara (Germany) L Siegemund	2	6	[10]
WC	(Japan) N Hibino (Japan) M Ninomiya	3	6^{5}
(Italy) A Moratelli (Czech Republic) A Sisková	6	7^{7}

Semifinals
1	(Canada) G Dabrowski (New Zealand) E Routliffe
4	(Spain) C Bucșa (Romania) M Niculescu	w/o
3	(Japan) E Shibahara (Germany) L Siegemund	6	6
(Italy) A Moratelli (Czech Republic) A Sisková	1	3

Final
4	(Spain) C Bucșa (Romania) M Niculescu	6	2	[2]
3	(Japan) E Shibahara (Germany) L Siegemund	3	6	[10]
