= 2008 ITF Kolkata Open – Doubles =

Doubles
- 2008 ITF Kolkata Open

Final
- Champion: (Germany) Laura Siegemund (Romania) Ágnes Szatmári
- Runner-up: (China) Lu Jingjing (China) Sun Shengnan
- Score: 7–5, 6–3

Events
Singles	Doubles
ITF Kolkata Open

Displayed below are the doubles results from the 2008 ITF Kolkata Open Women's Tennis Tournament.
Alla Kudryavtseva and Vania King were the defending champions, but they chose not to participate that year.
Laura Siegemund and Ágnes Szatmári won the title, defeating Lu Jingjing and Sun Shengnan in the final, 7–5, 6–3.

== Seeds ==
1. (China) Lu Jingjing / (China) Sun Shengnan (final)
2. (Chinese Taipei) Chan Chin-wei / (Chinese Taipei) Chen Yi (semifinals)
3. (Germany) Laura Siegemund / (Romania) Ágnes Szatmári (champions)
4. (Chinese Taipei) Chang Kai-chen / (Chinese Taipei) Hwang I-hsuan (quarterfinals)

== Draw ==
=== Key ===
- Q = Qualifier
- WC = Wild card
- LL = Lucky loser
- Alt = Alternate
- SE = Special exempt
- PR = Protected ranking
- ITF = ITF entry
- JE = Junior exempt
- w/o = Walkover
- r = Retired
- d = Defaulted
- SR = Special ranking

=== Draw ===
First round
1	(China) J Lu (China) S Sun	6	6
(Kyrgyzstan) K Palkina (Russia) J Parasyuk	2	3
(Israel) J Glushko (France) F Haring	4	2
(United States) S Rao (India) S Uberoi	6	6
4	(Chinese Taipei) K-c Chang (Chinese Taipei) I-h Hwang	6	6
Q	(India) P-M Appineni (Poland) P Sanduska	4	0
Q	(Ukraine) I Kiriienko (Russia) I Kuzmenko	3	6^{7}
(Australia) S Ferguson (United States) A Prousis	6	7^{9}
(India) A Bhambri (India) P Bhambri	6	6
WC	(India) T Bhattacharyya (India) S Sahoo	2	2
WC	(India) P Goswami (India) P Maloo	0	1
3	(Germany) L Siegemund (Romania) Á Szatmári	6	6
(India) R Chakravarthi (India) I Lakhani	6	2	[10]
(Netherlands) L Mekel (Thailand) V Wongteanchai	4	6	[6]
WC	(India) S Burman (Thailand) N Lertcheewakarn	4	0
2	(Chinese Taipei) C-w Chan (Chinese Taipei) Y Chen	6	6

Quarterfinals
1	(China) J Lu (China) S Sun	4	7	[10]
(United States) S Rao (India) S Uberoi	6	5	[5]
4	(Chinese Taipei) K-c Chang (Chinese Taipei) I-h Hwang	6	6^{4}	[4]
(Australia) S Ferguson (United States) A Prousis	3	7^{7}	[10]
(India) A Bhambri (India) S Bhambri	1	6	[9]
3	(Germany) L Siegemund (Romania) Á Szatmári	6	4	[11]
(India) R Chakravarthi (India) I Lakhani	4	6^{3}
2	(Chinese Taipei) C-w Chan (Chinese Taipei) Y Chen	6	7^{7}

Semifinals
1	(China) J Lu (China) S Sun	6	6
(Australia) S Ferguson (United States) A Prousis	3	3
3	(Germany) L Siegemund (Romania) Á Szatmári	4	6	[10]
2	(Chinese Taipei) C-w Chan (Chinese Taipei) Y Chen	6	3	[6]

Final
1	(China) J Lu (China) S Sun	5	3
3	(Germany) L Siegemund (Romania) Á Szatmári	7	6
