= Carinthian Ladies Lake's Trophy =

- 2022 Carinthian Ladies Lake's Trophy

ITF Women's Tour
- Event name: Carinthian Ladies Lake's Trophy
- Location: Pörtschach am Wörthersee, Austria
- Venue: Werzer Arena
- Category: ITF Women's World Tennis Tour
- Surface: Clay / outdoor
- Draw: 32S/32Q/16D
- Prize money: $60,000

The Carinthian Ladies Lake's Trophy is a tournament for professional female tennis players played on outdoor clay courts. The event is classified as a $60,000 ITF Women's World Tennis Tour tournament and has been held in Pörtschach am Wörthersee, Austria, since 2022.

== Past finals ==
=== Singles ===
Year	Champion	Runner-up	Score
2022	(Germany) Laura Siegemund	(Slovakia) Viktória Kužmová	6–2, 6–2

=== Doubles ===
Year	Champions	Runners-up	Score
2022	(United States) Jessie Aney (Czech Republic) Anna Sisková	(Switzerland) Jenny Dürst (Poland) Weronika Falkowska	6–3, 6–4
