= 2023 Japan Women's Open =

- Date: 11–17 September
- Edition: 12th
- Category: WTA 250
- Draw: 32S / 16D
- Prize money: $259,303
- Surface: Hard
- Location: Osaka, Japan
- Venue: Utsubo Tennis Center

Champions

Singles
- (United States) Ashlyn Krueger

Doubles
- (Germany) Anna-Lena Friedsam / (Ukraine) Nadiia Kichenok
- Japan Women's Open

The 2023 Japan Women's Open (also known as the Kinoshita Group Japan Open for sponsorship purposes) was a women's tennis tournament played on outdoor hard courts. It was the twelfth edition of the Japan Women's Open, and part of the WTA 250 tournaments of the 2023 WTA Tour. It was held at the Utsubo Tennis Center in Osaka, Japan, from 11 to 17 September 2023. This was the first edition of the tournament since 2019, when it was held in Hiroshima. The 2020 and 2021 editions were cancelled due to the COVID-19 pandemic, while the 2022 edition was cancelled for financial reasons. Unseeded Ashlyn Krueger won the singles title.

== Finals ==
=== Singles ===
- (United States) Ashlyn Krueger defeated (China) Zhu Lin 6–3, 7–6^{(8–6)}

=== Doubles ===
- (Germany) Anna-Lena Friedsam / (Ukraine) Nadiia Kichenok defeated Anna Kalinskaya / (Kazakhstan) Yulia Putintseva 7–6^{(7–3)}, 6–3

== Singles main-draw entrants ==
=== Seeds ===
Country	Player	Rank^{1}	Seed
CHN	Zhu Lin	44	1
GER	Tatjana Maria	47	2
CHN	Wang Xinyu	53	3
CZE	Linda Fruhvirtová	56	4
ARG	Nadia Podoroska	70	5
KAZ	Yulia Putintseva	78	6
JPN	Nao Hibino	81	7
UKR	Kateryna Baindl	83	8

- Rankings are as of 28 August 2023

=== Other entrants ===
The following players received wildcards into the singles main draw:

- (Japan) Misaki Doi
- (Japan) Mai Hontama
- (Japan) Moyuka Uchijima

The following players received entry from the qualifying draw:

- (Philippines) Alexandra Eala
- (Netherlands) Arianne Hartono
- (United States) Elizabeth Mandlik
- (India) Ankita Raina
- (Japan) Himeno Sakatsume
- Valeria Savinykh

=== Withdrawals ===
- (Germany) Tamara Korpatsch → replaced by (Switzerland) Viktorija Golubic
- (United States) Peyton Stearns → replaced by (United States) Ashlyn Krueger
- (Ukraine) Lesia Tsurenko → replaced by (Hungary) Panna Udvardy

== Doubles main-draw entrants ==
=== Seeds ===
Country	Player	Country	Player	Rank^{1}	Seed
TPE	Latisha Chan	CHN	Zhu Lin	127	1
JPN	Eri Hozumi	JPN	Makoto Ninomiya	143	2
GBR	Naiktha Bains	GBR	Maia Lumsden	181	3
GBR	Alicia Barnett	GBR	Olivia Nicholls	192	4

- ^{1} Rankings are as of 28 August 2023

=== Other entrants ===
The following teams received wildcards into the doubles main draw:

- (Japan) Natsumi Kawaguchi / (Japan) Momoko Kobori
- (Japan) Yuki Naito / (Japan) Moyuka Uchijima
