= 2026 Japan Women's Open – Doubles =

Doubles
- 2026 Japan Women's Open

Final
- Champions: (Australia) Storm Hunter (Indonesia) Janice Tjen
- Runners-up: (Czech Republic) Jesika Malečková (Czech Republic) Miriam Škoch
- Score: 6–4, 6–1
- Date: 24 October 2026

Details
- Draw: 16
- Seeds: 4

Events
Singles	Doubles
- Japan Women's Open

Storm Hunter and Janice Tjen defeated Jesika Malečková and Miriam Škoch in the final, 6–4, 6–1 to win the doubles tennis title at the 2026 Japan Women's Open.

Kristina Mladenovic and Taylor Townsend were the reigning champions, but Townsend did not participate this year and Mladenovic chose to compete in Ningbo instead.

== Seeds ==
1. (Australia) Storm Hunter / (Indonesia) Janice Tjen (champions)
2. (Chinese Taipei) Chan Hao-ching / (Japan) Miyu Kato (semifinals)
3. (Estonia) Ingrid Neel / (Mexico) Giuliana Olmos (quarterfinals)
4. (United States) Ashlyn Krueger / (United States) Caty McNally (withdrew)

== Draw ==
Key

- Q = Qualifier
- WC = Wild card
- LL = Lucky loser
- Alt = Alternate
- ITF = ITF entry
- PR = Protected ranking
- SR = Special ranking
- SE = Special exempt
- JE = Junior exempt
- JR = Junior Accelerator Programme entrant
- CO = College Accelerator Programme entrant
- NG = Next Gen Accelerator Program entrant
- w/o = Walkover
- r = Retired
- d = Defaulted

=== Draw ===
First round
1	(Australia) S Hunter (Indonesia) J Tjen	6	6
(Brazil) I Martins (Spain) S Sorribes Tormo	2	2
(Chinese Taipei) Y-h Lee (Chinese Taipei) F-h Wu	6	6
WC	(Japan) M Hontama (Japan) M Uchijima	3	3
3	(Estonia) I Neel (Mexico) G Olmos	6^{4}	6	[11]
(Chinese Taipei) I-h Cho (Chinese Taipei) Y-t Cho	7^{7}	3	[9]
(Argentina) N Fossa Huergo (Thailand) P Plipuech	6^{4}	6	[6]
(Netherlands) I Haverlag (Austria) L Tagger	7^{7}	4	[10]
(Chile) A Guarachi (United States) A Muhammad	3	4
(Czech Republic) J Malečková (Czech Republic) M Škoch	6	6
(United States) C Liu (Spain) K Quevedo	7^{7}	7
Alt	(United Kingdom) H Dart (United Kingdom) H Watson	6^{5}	5
WC	(Japan) M Kobori (Japan) A Shimizu	6	6
(Ukraine) L Kichenok (Japan) M Ninomiya	4	3
(Japan) E Hozumi (Slovenia) A Klepač	4	4
2	(Chinese Taipei) H-c Chan (Japan) M Kato	6	6

Quarterfinals
1	(Australia) S Hunter (Indonesia) J Tjen	4	6	[10]
(Chinese Taipei) Y-h Lee (Chinese Taipei) F-h Wu	6	3	[6]
3	(Estonia) I Neel (Mexico) G Olmos	3	6^{4}
(Netherlands) I Haverlag (Austria) L Tagger	6	7^{7}
(Czech Republic) J Malečková (Czech Republic) M Škoch	6	6^{5}	[10]
(United States) C Liu (Spain) K Quevedo	3	7^{7}	[8]
WC	(Japan) M Kobori (Japan) A Shimizu	3	7^{7}	[9]
2	(Chinese Taipei) H-c Chan (Japan) M Kato	6	6^{5}	[11]

Semifinals
1	(Australia) S Hunter (Indonesia) J Tjen	6	5	[10]
(Netherlands) I Haverlag (Austria) L Tagger	2	7	[8]
(Czech Republic) J Malečková (Czech Republic) M Škoch	2	6	[10]
2	(Chinese Taipei) H-c Chan (Japan) M Kato	6	3	[5]

Final
1	(Australia) S Hunter (Indonesia) J Tjen	6	6
(Czech Republic) J Malečková (Czech Republic) M Škoch	4	1
