= 2026 Japan Women's Open =

- Date: 19–25 October
- Edition: 15th
- Category: WTA 250
- Draw: 32S / 16D
- Prize money: $283,347
- Surface: Hard
- Location: Osaka, Japan
- Venue: Utsubo Tennis Center

Champions

Singles
- (Czech Republic) Kateřina Siniaková

Doubles
- (Australia) Storm Hunter / (Indonesia) Janice Tjen
- Japan Women's Open

The 2026 Kinoshita Group Japan Open was a women's tennis tournament played on outdoor hard courts. It was the 15th edition of the Japan Women's Open, and part of the WTA 250 tournaments of the 2026 WTA Tour. It was held at the Utsubo Tennis Center in Osaka, Japan, from 19 to 25 October 2026.

== Champions ==
=== Singles ===
- (Czech Republic) Kateřina Siniaková def. (United States) Ashlyn Krueger 6–1, 6–0

=== Doubles ===
- (Australia) Storm Hunter / (Indonesia) Janice Tjen def. (Czech Republic) Jesika Malečková / (Czech Republic) Miriam Škoch, 6–4, 6–1

== Singles main-draw entrants ==
=== Seeds ===
Country	Player	Rank^{1}	Seed
USA	Ann Li	31	1
USA	Peyton Stearns	37	2
~~AUS~~	~~Kimberly Birrell~~	~~40~~	~~3~~
AUS	Talia Gibson	41	4
	Liudmila Samsonova	43	5
INA	Janice Tjen	47	6
UKR	Oleksandra Oliynykova	51	7
GBR	Katie Boulter	54	8

- Rankings are as of 12 October 2026

=== Other entrants ===
The following players received wildcards into the singles main draw:

- (Japan) Mai Hontama
- (Japan) Himeno Sakatsume
- (Japan) Ena Shibahara
- (Japan) Moyuka Uchijima

The following player received entry using a protected ranking:

- ~~(United Kingdom) Sonay Kartal~~

The following players received entry from the qualifying draw:

- (United Kingdom) Harriet Dart
- (Australia) Maya Joint
- (Australia) Emerson Jones
- (Austria) Sinja Kraus
- (United States) Claire Liu
- (United States) Mary Stoiana

The following players received entry as lucky losers:

- (United States) Kayla Day
- (United States) Sofia Kenin

=== Withdrawals ===
- (Czech Republic) Nikola Bartůňková → replaced by (Croatia) Antonia Ružić
- (Australia) Kimberly Birrell → replaced by (United States) Sofia Kenin
- (United Kingdom) Sonay Kartal → replaced by (United States) Kayla Day
- (Colombia) Camila Osorio → replaced by (Spain) Kaitlin Quevedo
- (Denmark) Clara Tauson → replaced by (United States) Caty McNally
- (China) Zheng Qinwen → replaced by (United States) Ashlyn Krueger

== Doubles main-draw entrants ==
=== Seeds ===
Country	Player	Country	Player	Rank^{1}	Seed
AUS	Storm Hunter	INA	Janice Tjen	65	1
TPE	Chan Hao-ching	JPN	Miyu Kato	85	2
EST	Ingrid Neel	MEX	Giuliana Olmos	104	3
~~USA~~	~~Ashlyn Krueger~~	~~USA~~	~~Caty McNally~~	~~108~~	~~4~~

- ^{1} Rankings are as of 12 October 2026

=== Other entrants ===
The following teams received wildcards into the doubles main draw:

- (Japan) Mai Hontama / (Japan) Moyuka Uchijima
- (Japan) Momoko Kobori / (Japan) Ayano Shimizu

THe following team received entry as alternates:

- (United Kingdom) Harriet Dart / (United Kingdom) Heather Watson

=== Withdrawals ===
- (United States) Ashlyn Krueger / (United States) Caty McNally → replaced by (United Kingdom) Harriet Dart / (United Kingdom) Heather Watson
