= 2010 HP Open – Singles =

Singles
- 2010 HP Open

Final
- Champion: (Thailand) Tamarine Tanasugarn
- Runner-up: (Japan) Kimiko Date-Krumm
- Score: 7–5, 6–7^{(4–7)}, 6–1

Details
- Draw: 32
- Seeds: 8

Events
Singles	Doubles
← 2009 ·	Japan Women's Open	· 2011 →

Samantha Stosur was the defending champion and top seed, but she was eliminated by Kimiko Date-Krumm in the quarterfinals 5–7, 6–3, 7–6^{(7–4)}.
Tamarine Tanasugarn won the title 7–5, 6–7^{(4–7)}, 6–1 by defeating the 40-year-old Date-Krumm in the final. With Tanasugarn herself being 33 years old, it was the oldest known final (73 years combined) in the history of women's tennis.

== Seeds ==
1. (Australia) Samantha Stosur (quarterfinals)
2. (France) Marion Bartoli (semifinals)
3. (Israel) Shahar Pe'er (semifinals)
4. (Russia) Maria Kirilenko (second round, retired due to a left hip injury)
5. (Russia) Alla Kudryavtseva (first round)
6. (Japan) Kimiko Date-Krumm (final)
7. (Czech Republic) Iveta Benešová (quarterfinals)
8. (Hungary) Gréta Arn (first round)

== Draw ==
Key

- Q = Qualifier
- WC = Wild card
- LL = Lucky loser
- Alt = Alternate
- ITF = ITF entry
- PR = Protected ranking
- SR = Special ranking
- SE = Special exempt
- JE = Junior exempt
- JR = Junior Accelerator Programme entrant
- CO = College Accelerator Programme entrant
- NG = Next Gen Accelerator Program entrant
- w/o = Walkover
- r = Retired
- d = Defaulted

=== Finals ===
Semifinals
6	(Japan) Kimiko Date-Krumm	3	7	7
3	(Israel) Shahar Pe'er	6	6^{5}	5
(Thailand) Tamarine Tanasugarn	6	7
2	(France) Marion Bartoli	2	5

Final
6	(Japan) Kimiko Date-Krumm	5	7	1
(Thailand) Tamarine Tanasugarn	7	6^{4}	6

=== Top half ===
First round
1	(Australia) S Stosur	6	6
WC	(Japan) S Ishizu	0	3
(Japan) J Namigata	6	6
Q	(Japan) T Yonemura	2	3
WC	(Japan) A Nakamura	7	2	6
(Russia) A Panova	6^{5}	6	3
Q	(United Kingdom) L Robson	3	3
6	(Japan) K Date-Krumm	6	6
3	(Israel) S Pe'er	6	6
(Japan) M Doi	2	3
(Italy) C Dentoni	4	2
WC	(Japan) R Fuda	6	6
(Italy) A Brianti	7	3	6
(Japan) A Morita	5	6	4
Q	(United States) C McHale	4	3
7	(Czech Republic) I Benešová	6	6

Second round
1	(Australia) S Stosur	6	6
(Japan) J Namigata	0	3
WC	(Japan) A Nakamura	2	0
6	(Japan) K Date-Krumm	6	6
3	(Israel) S Pe'er	3	6	6
WC	(Japan) R Fuda	6	1	3
(Italy) A Brianti	1	5
7	(Czech Republic) I Benešová	6	7

Quarterfinals
1	(Australia) S Stosur	7	3	6^{4}
6	(Japan) K Date-Krumm	5	6	7
3	(Israel) S Pe'er	6	6
7	(Czech Republic) I Benešová	2	0

Semifinals
6	(Japan) K Date-Krumm	3	7	7
3	(Israel) S Pe'er	6	6^{5}	5

=== Bottom half ===
First round
5	(Russia) A Kudryavtseva	1	2
(United States) C Vandeweghe	6	6
(Thailand) T Tanasugarn	6	7
(Slovakia) M Rybáriková	2	5
(United States) L Osterloh	5	4
(Chinese Taipei) K-c Chang	7	6
(Japan) K Nara	1	0
4	(Russia) M Kirilenko	6	6
8	(Hungary) G Arn	1	2
(Ukraine) O Savchuk	6	6
(United States) J Craybas	6	6
Q	(South Africa) N Grandin	4	2
(Australia) S Ferguson	4	6^{5}
(Switzerland) S Vögele	6	7
(France) J Coin	2	1
2	(France) M Bartoli	6	6

Second round
(United States) C Vandeweghe	7	5	4
(Thailand) T Tanasugarn	5	7	6
(Chinese Taipei) K-c Chang	6
4	(Russia) M Kirilenko	4	r
(Ukraine) O Savchuk	1	1
(United States) J Craybas	6	6
(Switzerland) S Vögele	2	2
2	(France) M Bartoli	6	6

Quarterfinals
(Thailand) T Tanasugarn	6	2	6
(Chinese Taipei) K-c Chang	3	6	4
(United States) J Craybas	1	2
2	(France) M Bartoli	6	6

Semifinals
(Thailand) T Tanasugarn	6	7
2	(France) M Bartoli	2	5
