= 2009 HP Open =

Women's tennis tournament

- Date: 12–18 October
- Edition: 1st
- Category: WTA International
- Draw: 32S / 16D
- Prize money: $220,000
- Surface: Hard / outdoor
- Location: Osaka, Japan

Champions

Singles
- (Australia) Samantha Stosur

Doubles
- (Chinese Taipei) Chuang Chia-jung / (United States) Lisa Raymond
Japan Women's Open	· 2010 →

The 2009 HP Open, also known as the HP Japan Women's Open Tennis, was a women's tennis tournament played on outdoor hard courts. It was the inaugural edition of the HP Open, and was classified as an WTA International tournaments of the 2009 WTA Tour. It was played in Osaka, Japan. Third-seeded Samantha Stosur won the singles title.

== Finals ==
=== Singles ===
(Australia) Samantha Stosur defeated (Italy) Francesca Schiavone 7–5, 6–1

- It was Stosur's 1st title of the year and the 1st of her career.

=== Doubles ===
(Chinese Taipei) Chuang Chia-jung / (United States) Lisa Raymond defeated (South Africa) Chanelle Scheepers / (United States) Abigail Spears 6–2, 6–4

== Players ==
=== Seeds ===
Country	Player	Rank^{1}	Seed
DEN	Caroline Wozniacki	5	1
FRA	Marion Bartoli	13	2
AUS	Samantha Stosur	14	3
ITA	Francesca Schiavone	26	4
ISR	Shahar Pe'er	34	5
CAN	Aleksandra Wozniak	35	6
HUN	Melinda Czink	40	7
KAZ	Yaroslava Shvedova	50	8

seeds are based on the rankings of October 5, 2009

=== Other entrants ===
The following players received wildcards into the singles main draw:

- (Japan) Kimiko Date-Krumm
- (Japan) Ryōko Fuda
- (Japan) Kurumi Nara

The following players received entry from the qualifying draw:

- (Russia) Anastasia Rodionova
- (Chinese Taipei) Chang Kai-Chen
- (Australia) Sophie Ferguson
- (South Africa) Chanelle Scheepers

The following player received a lucky loser spot:

- (Russia) Alexandra Panova
