= 2009 HP Open – Doubles =

Doubles
- 2009 HP Open

Final
- Champions: (Chinese Taipei) Chuang Chia-jung (United States) Lisa Raymond
- Runners-up: (South Africa) Chanelle Scheepers (United States) Abigail Spears
- Score: 6–2, 6–4

Details
- Draw: 16

Events
Singles	Doubles
Japan Women's Open	· 2010 →

Chuang Chia-jung and Lisa Raymond won in the final 6–2, 6–4 against Chanelle Scheepers and Abigail Spears.

== Seeds ==
1. (Chinese Taipei) Chuang Chia-jung / (United States) Lisa Raymond (champions)
2. (United States) Vania King / (India) Sania Mirza (quarterfinals)
3. (Turkey) İpek Şenoğlu / (Kazakhstan) Yaroslava Shvedova (quarterfinals)
4. (United States) Jill Craybas / (Thailand) Tamarine Tanasugarn (semifinals)

== Draw ==
Key

- Q = Qualifier
- WC = Wild card
- LL = Lucky loser
- Alt = Alternate
- ITF = ITF entry
- PR = Protected ranking
- SR = Special ranking
- SE = Special exempt
- JE = Junior exempt
- JR = Junior Accelerator Programme entrant
- CO = College Accelerator Programme entrant
- NG = Next Gen Accelerator Program entrant
- w/o = Walkover
- r = Retired
- d = Defaulted

First round
1	(Chinese Taipei) C-j Chuang (United States) L Raymond	6	4	[10]
(Chinese Taipei) Y-j Chan (Japan) K Date-Krumm	2	6	[3]
(Chinese Taipei) K-C Chang (United States) R Zalameda	6	6
WC	(Japan) A Morigami (Japan) K Nara	3	4
4	(United States) J Craybas (Thailand) T Tanasugarn	6	6
(United States) A Haynes (Chinese Taipei) W-h Hsu	4	2
(Japan) R Tezuka (Japan) A Yonemura	4	2
(Hungary) M Czink (South Africa) N Grandin	6	6
(South Africa) C Scheepers (United States) A Spears	4	6	[10]
(United States) C Gullickson (Australia) N Kriz	6	1	[7]
(Chinese Taipei) C-w Chan (Chinese Taipei) I-h Hwang	1	4
3	(Turkey) I Şenoğlu (Kazakhstan) Y Shvedova	6	6
(France) J Coin (France) M Johansson	6	6
(Chinese Taipei) Y Chen (Japan) R Fujiwara	1	1
(Japan) A Oka (Japan) T Yonemura	0	6^{5}
2	(United States) V King (India) S Mirza	6	7

Quarterfinals
1	(Chinese Taipei) C-j Chuang (United States) L Raymond	5	6	[10]
(Chinese Taipei) K-C Chang (United States) R Zalameda	7	0	[6]
4	(United States) J Craybas (Thailand) T Tanasugarn	4	7	[10]
(Hungary) M Czink (South Africa) N Grandin	6	5	[8]
(South Africa) C Scheepers (United States) A Spears	6	6^{5}	[10]
3	(Turkey) I Şenoğlu (Kazakhstan) Y Shvedova	3	7	[4]
(France) J Coin (France) M Johansson	6	6
2	(United States) V King (India) S Mirza	4	2

Semifinals
1	(Chinese Taipei) C-j Chuang (United States) L Raymond	6	6
4	(United States) J Craybas (Thailand) T Tanasugarn	1	1
(South Africa) C Scheepers (United States) A Spears	7	6
(France) J Coin (France) M Johansson	6^{5}	3

Finals
1	(Chinese Taipei) C-j Chuang (United States) L Raymond	6	6
(South Africa) C Scheepers (United States) A Spears	2	4
