= 2010 HP Open =

Women's tennis tournament

- Date: 11–17 October
- Edition: 2nd
- Category: WTA International
- Draw: 32S / 16D
- Prize money: $220,000
- Surface: Hard / outdoor
- Location: Osaka, Japan

Champions

Singles
- (Thailand) Tamarine Tanasugarn

Doubles
- (Chinese Taipei) Chang Kai-chen / (United States) Lilia Osterloh
← 2009 ·	Japan Women's Open	· 2011 →

The 2010 HP Open, also known as the HP Japan Women's Open Tennis, was a women's tennis tournament played on outdoor hard courts. It was the second edition of the HP Open, and was classified as one of the WTA International tournaments of the 2010 WTA Tour. It was played in Osaka, Japan from October 11 to October 17, 2010. Unseeded Tamarine Tanasugarn won the singles title.

== Finals ==
=== Singles ===
(Thailand) Tamarine Tanasugarn defeated (Japan) Kimiko Date-Krumm, 7–5, 6–7^{(4–7)}, 6–1

- It was Tanasugarn's only singles title of the year and the 4th and last of her career.
- It was the oldest known final ever, at a combined age of 73.

=== Doubles ===
(Chinese Taipei) Chang Kai-chen / (United States) Lilia Osterloh defeated (Japan) Shuko Aoyama / (Japan) Rika Fujiwara, 6–0, 6–3

== WTA players ==
=== Seeds ===
Country	Player	Rank^{1}	Seed
AUS	Samantha Stosur	8	1
FRA	Marion Bartoli	14	2
ISR	Shahar Pe'er	18	3
RUS	Maria Kirilenko	26	4
RUS	Alla Kudryavtseva	56	5
JPN	Kimiko Date-Krumm	57	6
CZE	Iveta Benešová	70	7
HUN	Gréta Arn	88	8

- Seeds are based on the rankings of October 4, 2010.

=== Other entrants ===
The following players received wildcards into the singles main draw:

- (Japan) Ryōko Fuda
- (Japan) Sachie Ishizu
- (Japan) Aiko Nakamura

The following players received entry from the qualifying draw:

- (South Africa) Natalie Grandin
- (United States) Christina McHale
- (United Kingdom) Laura Robson
- (Japan) Tomoko Yonemura
