= 2010 HP Open – Doubles =

Doubles
- 2010 HP Open

Final
- Champions: (Chinese Taipei) Chang Kai-chen (United States) Lilia Osterloh
- Runners-up: (Japan) Shuko Aoyama (Japan) Rika Fujiwara
- Score: 6–0, 6–3

Details
- Draw: 16
- Seeds: 4

Events
Singles	Doubles
← 2009 ·	Japan Women's Open	· 2011 →

Chuang Chia-jung and Lisa Raymond were the defending champions, but they decided to not compete this year.
Other Taiwanese-American pair won this tournament. Chang Kai-chen and Lilia Osterloh defeated Shuko Aoyama and Rika Fujiwara 6–0, 6–3 in the final.

== Seeds ==
1. (Italy) Alberta Brianti / (Slovakia) Magdaléna Rybáriková (semifinals)
2. (Chinese Taipei) Chan Chin-wei / (South Africa) Natalie Grandin (semifinals)
3. (Chinese Taipei) Chang Kai-chen / (United States) Lilia Osterloh (champions)
4. (Japan) Kimiko Date-Krumm / (Japan) Ayumi Morita (quarterfinals)

== Draw ==
Key

- Q = Qualifier
- WC = Wild card
- LL = Lucky loser
- Alt = Alternate
- ITF = ITF entry
- PR = Protected ranking
- SR = Special ranking
- SE = Special exempt
- JE = Junior exempt
- JR = Junior Accelerator Programme entrant
- CO = College Accelerator Programme entrant
- NG = Next Gen Accelerator Program entrant
- w/o = Walkover
- r = Retired
- d = Defaulted

=== Draw ===
First round
1	(Italy) A Brianti (Slovakia) M Rybáriková	7	6
WC	(Japan) J Namigata (Japan) K Nara	5	4
(Japan) A Maekawa (Indonesia) L Tananta	4	6	[10]
(Japan) A Yonemura (Japan) T Yonemura	6	1	[8]
3	(Chinese Taipei) K-c Chang (United States) L Osterloh	6	5	[10]
(Australia) S Ferguson (Russia) K Lykina	4	7	[4]
(Japan) N Hamamura (Japan) M Miyamura	2	2
(Indonesia) Y Basuki (Ukraine) T Luzhanska	6	6
(Japan) S Aoyama (Japan) R Fujiwara	6	6
(Russia) A Panova (Switzerland) S Vögele	3	4
(Italy) C Dentoni (Japan) A Nakamura	4	5
4	(Japan) K Date-Krumm (Japan) A Morita	6	7
(Thailand) N Lertcheewakarn (Thailand) T Tanasugarn	6	6
(Japan) M Doi (Japan) R Fuda	2	4
(Japan) K Iijima (Japan) Y Sema	2	4
2	(Chinese Taipei) C-w Chan (South Africa) N Grandin	6	6

Quarterfinals
1	(Italy) A Brianti (Slovakia) M Rybáriková	6	6
(Japan) A Maekawa (Indonesia) L Tananta	3	2
3	(Chinese Taipei) K-c Chang (United States) L Osterloh	6	3	[10]
(Indonesia) Y Basuki (Ukraine) T Luzhanska	3	6	[6]
(Japan) S Aoyama (Japan) R Fujiwara	6^{5}	6	[10]
4	(Japan) K Date-Krumm (Japan) A Morita	7	3	[8]
(Thailand) N Lertcheewakarn (Thailand) T Tanasugarn	6^{2}	6	[6]
2	(Chinese Taipei) C-w Chan (South Africa) N Grandin	7	2	[10]

Semifinals
1	(Italy) A Brianti (Slovakia) M Rybáriková	4	3
3	(Chinese Taipei) K-c Chang (United States) L Osterloh	6	6
(Japan) S Aoyama (Japan) R Fujiwara	6	6
2	(Chinese Taipei) C-w Chan (South Africa) N Grandin	3	4

Finals
3	(Chinese Taipei) K-c Chang (United States) L Osterloh	6	6
(Japan) S Aoyama (Japan) R Fujiwara	0	3
