= 2009 HP Open – Singles =

Singles
- 2009 HP Open

Final
- Champion: (Australia) Samantha Stosur
- Runner-up: (Italy) Francesca Schiavone
- Score: 7–5, 6–1

Details
- Draw: 32 (4 Q / 3 WC )
- Seeds: 8

Events
Singles	Doubles
- Japan Women's Open

This was the first edition of the HP Open.

Samantha Stosur won her first career WTA singles title, defeating Francesca Schiavone in the final 7–5, 6–1.

== Seeds ==
1. (Denmark) Caroline Wozniacki (semifinals)
2. (France) Marion Bartoli (quarterfinals, retired due to a right shoulder injury)
3. (Australia) Samantha Stosur (champion)
4. (Italy) Francesca Schiavone (final)
5. (Israel) Shahar Pe'er (first round)
6. (Canada) Aleksandra Wozniak (quarterfinals)
7. (Hungary) Melinda Czink (quarterfinals, withdrew due to a right foot injury)
8. (Kazakhstan) Yaroslava Shvedova (first round)

== Draw ==
Key

- Q = Qualifier
- WC = Wild card
- LL = Lucky loser
- Alt = Alternate
- ITF = ITF entry
- PR = Protected ranking
- SR = Special ranking
- SE = Special exempt
- JE = Junior exempt
- JR = Junior Accelerator Programme entrant
- CO = College Accelerator Programme entrant
- NG = Next Gen Accelerator Program entrant
- w/o = Walkover
- r = Retired
- d = Defaulted

=== Finals ===
Semifinals
1	(Denmark) Caroline Wozniacki	0	6	4
3	(Australia) Samantha Stosur	6	4	6
4	(Italy) Francesca Schiavone	6	6
(India) Sania Mirza	2	1

Final
3	(Australia) Samantha Stosur	7	6
4	(Italy) Francesca Schiavone	5	1

=== Top half ===
First round
1	(Denmark) C Wozniacki	6	6
(Japan) A Morita	4	1
(United Kingdom) K O'Brien	6	6
(United States) A Glatch	3	4
(Thailand) T Tanasugarn	5	1
Q	(Chinese Taipei) K-C Chang	7	6
Q	(Australia) S Ferguson	1	5
6	(Canada) A Wozniak	6	7
3	(Australia) S Stosur	6	6
LL	(Russia) A Panova	2	4
(Japan) A Morigami	6	4	6
Q	(Russia) A Rodionova	4	6	2
WC	(Japan) K Date-Krumm	4	6	4
(United States) J Craybas	6	2	6
(France) M Johansson	7	2	7
8	(Kazakhstan) Y Shvedova	5	6	5

Second round
1	(Denmark) C Wozniacki	6	6
(United Kingdom) K O'Brien	0	1
Q	(Chinese Taipei) K-C Chang	5	6^{2}
6	(Canada) A Wozniak	7	7
3	(Australia) S Stosur	6	6
(Japan) A Morigami	1	2
(United States) J Craybas	2	6	6
(France) M Johansson	6	2	0

Quarterfinals
1	(Denmark) C Wozniacki	6	6^{1}	6
6	(Canada) A Wozniak	2	7	2
3	(Australia) S Stosur	6	6
(United States) J Craybas	1	3

Semifinals
1	(Denmark) C Wozniacki	0	6	4
3	(Australia) S Stosur	6	4	6

=== Bottom half ===
First round
7	(Hungary) M Czink	6	6
WC	(Japan) R Fuda	4	4
(France) J Coin	6	3	4
(United States) V King	2	6	6
(Chinese Taipei) Y-j Chan	6	6
(United States) C Gullickson	1	1
(Luxembourg) A Kremer	5	2
4	(Italy) F Schiavone	7	6
5	(Israel) S Pe'er	6	3	4
(India) S Mirza	3	6	6
(Russia) M Kirilenko	2	r
(Ukraine) V Kutuzova	6
Q	(South Africa) C Scheepers	6^{5}	6	2
WC	(Japan) K Nara	7	4	6
(Kazakhstan) G Voskoboeva	3	5
2	(France) M Bartoli	6	7

Second round
7	(Hungary) M Czink	6	6
(United States) V King	4	2
(Chinese Taipei) Y-j Chan	3	6	3
4	(Italy) F Schiavone	6	0	6
(India) S Mirza	6	6
(Ukraine) V Kutuzova	4	3
WC	(Japan) K Nara	1	1
2	(France) M Bartoli	6	6

Quarterfinals
7	(Hungary) M Czink
4	(Italy) F Schiavone	w/o
(India) S Mirza	6	2
2	(France) M Bartoli	4	0	r

Semifinals
4	(Italy) F Schiavone	6	6
(India) S Mirza	2	1
