= Samantha Stosur =

Australian tennis player (born 1984)

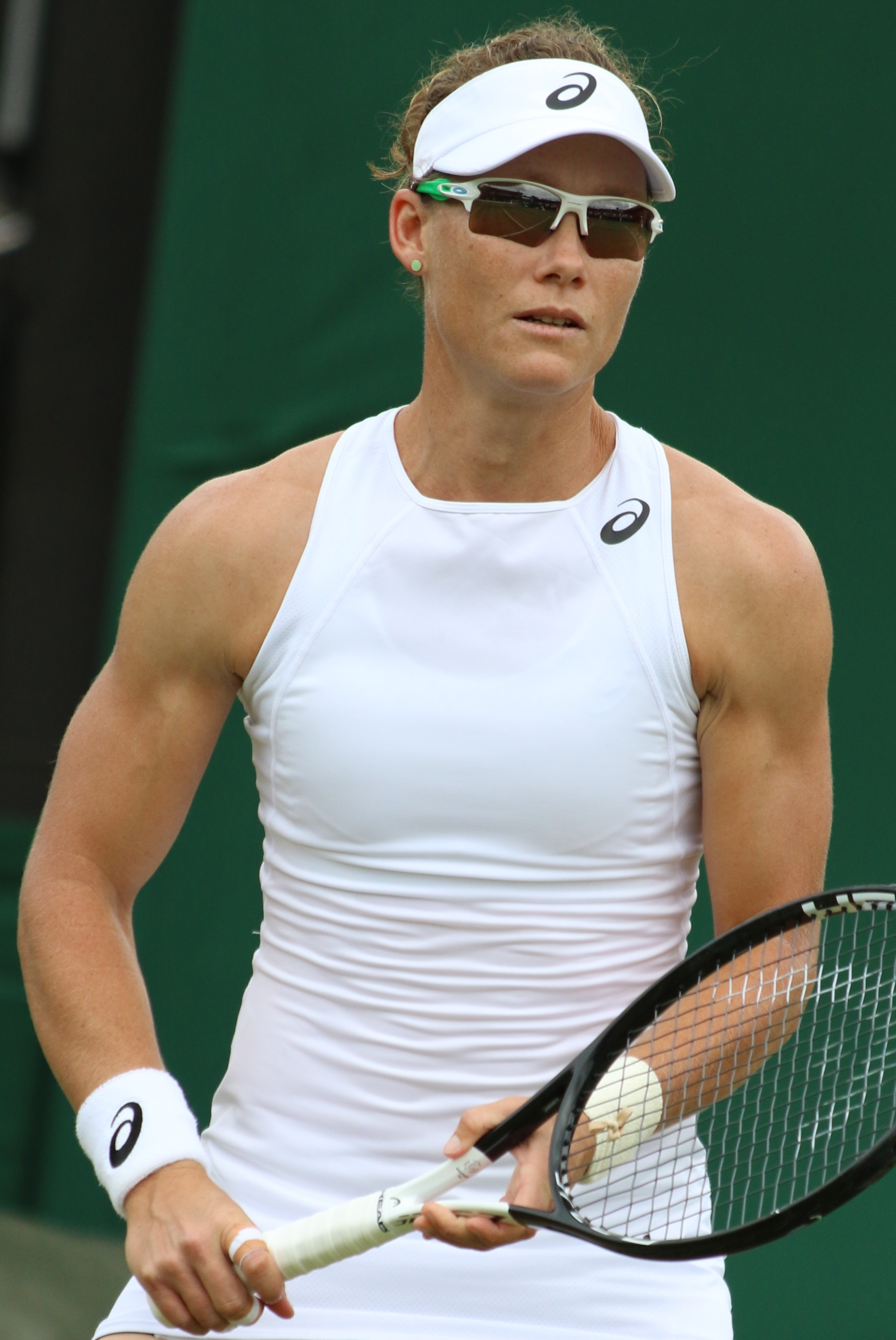
- Stosur at the 2019 Wimbledon Championships
- Country (sports): Australia
- Residence: Gold Coast, Queensland, Australia
- Born: 30 March 1984 (age 42) Brisbane, Queensland, Australia
- Height: 1.75 m (5 ft 9 in)
- Turned pro: 1999
- Retired: May 2022 (singles); January 2023 (doubles)
- Plays: Right-handed (two-handed backhand)
- Prize money: US$20,069,776: 25th in all-time rankings
- Official website: samstosur.com

Singles
- Career record: 607–457
- Career titles: 9
- Highest ranking: No. 4 (21 February 2011)

Grand Slam singles results
- Australian Open: 4R (2006, 2010)
- French Open: F (2010)
- Wimbledon: 3R (2009, 2013, 2015)
- US Open: W (2011)

Other tournaments
- Tour Finals: SF (2010, 2011)
- Olympic Games: 3R (2016)

Doubles
- Career record: 450–258
- Career titles: 28
- Highest ranking: No. 1 (6 February 2006)

Grand Slam doubles results
- Australian Open: W (2019)
- French Open: W (2006)
- Wimbledon: F (2008, 2009, 2011)
- US Open: W (2005, 2021)

Other doubles tournaments
- Tour Finals: W (2005, 2006)
- Olympic Games: QF (2021)

Mixed doubles
- Career titles: 3

Grand Slam mixed doubles results
- Australian Open: W (2005)
- French Open: SF (2005)
- Wimbledon: W (2008, 2014)
- US Open: SF (2019)

Other mixed doubles tournaments
- Olympic Games: QF (2012)

Team competitions
- Fed Cup: F (2019, 2022); Record: 39–21
- Hopman Cup: RR (2006, 2010, 2014)

Samantha Jane Stosur (born 30 March 1984) is an Australian former professional tennis player. She was a world No. 1 in doubles, a ranking which she first achieved on 6 February 2006 and held for 61 consecutive weeks. Also a former top ten singles player, Stosur reached a career-high singles ranking of world No. 4 on 21 February 2011 and spent a total of 165 weeks ranked inside the top ten, between March 2010 and June 2013. Stosur was also the top-ranked Australian singles player for 452 consecutive weeks, from October 2008 to June 2017, and was ranked inside the top 25 for a period of nine straight years. She won a combined total of 40 career titles (9 in singles, 28 in doubles, and 3 in mixed doubles), including eight major titles, and amassed more than $20 million in prize money.

Stosur won a major singles title at the 2011 US Open, where she beat Serena Williams in the final and became the first Australian woman since Evonne Goolagong Cawley in 1980 to win a Grand Slam tournament. She had previously reached another major singles final at the 2010 French Open, along the way defeating former world No. 1 and four-time champion Justine Henin in the fourth round, ending the Belgian's 24-match winning streak at the tournament, and then-world No. 1 Serena Williams in the quarterfinals, before losing to Francesca Schiavone. Her other major singles achievements include two semifinal finishes at the WTA Finals in 2010 and 2011, as well as reaching three WTA 1000 finals (the Italian Open and Canadian Open in 2011, and the Qatar Open in 2012) and the final of the WTA Elite Trophy in 2013. She also reached the semifinals of the French Open in 2009, 2012 and 2016, and the US Open quarterfinals in 2010 and 2012.

Stosur is a four-time major champion in women's doubles, winning the 2005 US Open and 2006 French Open with Lisa Raymond, and the 2019 Australian Open and 2021 US Open with Zhang Shuai, and reaching an additional five major finals (three with Raymond, one with compatriot Rennae Stubbs, and one with Sabine Lisicki). She won back-to-back WTA Tour Championships doubles titles with Raymond in 2005 and 2006, and was the co-year end world No. 1 with Raymond in 2006. Stosur has also won three mixed-doubles Grand Slam tournament titles, at the 2005 Australian Open with Scott Draper, the 2008 Wimbledon Championships with Bob Bryan, and the 2014 Wimbledon Championships with Nenad Zimonjić.

== Early life ==
Stosur was born in Brisbane, Queensland and spent the first six years of her life living on the Gold Coast. She is the daughter of Tony and Diane, and has two brothers, Dominic and Daniel. The Stosur family is of Polish descent through Sam's paternal grandfather. When she was six, the family house and business on the Gold Coast were destroyed by a flood, and the family moved to Adelaide. There she started playing tennis, when she was given a racquet for Christmas at the age of eight. While her parents worked long hours at the cafe they had started, Stosur played at local courts with older brother Daniel, who later encouraged their parents to take her to tennis lessons. Her family returned to the Gold Coast when Stosur was eleven years of age. There she attended initially attended Robina State Primary School alongside close friend Nick Riewoldt and later switched to Helensvale State High School. She went away on her first overseas trip at the age of 13, competing in the World Youth Cup in Jakarta, Indonesia.

At the age of 14, Stosur joined the Queensland Academy of Sport (QAS) under Geoff Masters. In 2001, when she was 16, she joined the Australian Institute of Sport tennis program.

== Tennis career ==
=== Early years ===
Stosur first played professional tennis in 1999 at the age of 15 at an ITF Women's Circuit event in her home state of Queensland where she claimed a straight sets first round victory in the qualifying draw before losing her second round qualifying match (2–6, 6–3, 3–6). In 2000, she debuted at the Australian Open losing in the first qualifying round. In the following year, she won four straight ITF titles. In 2002, she lost in the first round at the Gold Coast hardcourts event.

In 2003, Stosur won her first WTA Tour singles matches, reaching the third round of the Australian Open. She lost in the third round to No. 7 seed, Daniela Hantuchová. She also qualified for the WTA event in Memphis.

In 2004, Stosur reached the semifinals of the Gold Coast event, before falling to Ai Sugiyama. She reached the second round of the Hobart International, then the second round of the Australian Open, and later qualified for WTA events in Acapulco, Indian Wells, Vienna and Birmingham. Stosur competed at the Athens Olympics, where she lost in the first round. She continued to play WTA events, qualifying for the Japan Open and Bali in the autumn of 2004. At the end of the 2004 season, she reached the doubles final in Québec City, partnered with Els Callens from Belgium.

=== 2005: Doubles success ===
Stosur reached her first WTA Tour final at her home event in Gold Coast, losing to Patty Schnyder. She was runner-up at the Sydney event, defeating by walkover the world No. 1, Lindsay Davenport, in the quarter-final and Elena Dementieva in the semifinal, before losing to fellow Australian Alicia Molik, and won her first doubles title partnering Australian Bryanne Stewart at the same tournament. Stosur lost to world No. 2, Amélie Mauresmo, in the first round of the Australian Open, but won the mixed-doubles title with Scott Draper over Liezel Huber and Kevin Ullyett.

In July, she teamed up with American Lisa Raymond, winning seven WTA doubles titles before the end of the year, including the US Open, the Kremlin Cup and the WTA Championships. Stosur finished the year ranked No. 46 in singles and No. 2 in doubles.

=== 2006: Doubles world No. 1 ===
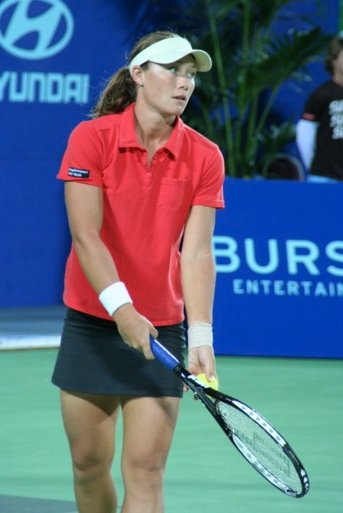
Stosur during the 2006 Hopman Cup

In 2006, she represented Australia alongside Todd Reid at the Hopman Cup, winning all of her singles matches. She then lost in the first round in Sydney International to Nicole Vaidišová in three sets. At the Australian Open, Stosur made it to the fourth round in singles, falling to Martina Hingis. She and Lisa Raymond also made it to the doubles final, where they were defeated by Chinese duo Yan Zi and Zheng Jie.

After losing in Melbourne, Stosur and Raymond won 18 straight matches, winning titles in Tokyo, Memphis, Indian Wells and Miami. They also won in Charleston, at the French Open, and the WTA Championships. On 28 August, Stosur had a career-high ranking of No. 30, after reaching the semifinals at New Haven, where she lost to Lindsay Davenport in two tiebreakers. She finished off 2006 by winning the doubles title at the WTA Championships in Madrid, ranked No. 1 in doubles, and a career high to that point, No. 29 in singles.

=== 2007: Lyme disease ===
Stosur and Raymond successfully defended their doubles titles in Tokyo, Indian Wells and Miami. The pair also won the German Open in Berlin. In singles, Stosur reached three quarter-finals, at Gold Coast, Tokyo and Memphis. At Rome, she defeated top-seed Amélie Mauresmo in the second round, saving two match points, before losing to Patty Schnyder in the following round.

After the French Open, Stosur started showing symptoms of what was months later diagnosed as Lyme disease, an infection transmitted by bite of ticks. By then, her form had slumped. She lost in the second round at Wimbledon, withdrew from many tournaments on the American hardcourt swing, and lost in the first round of the US Open, where she was seeded 29th, to No.-96-rated Alizé Cornet. Stosur did not play in any more tournaments in 2007.

=== 2008: Return from illness ===
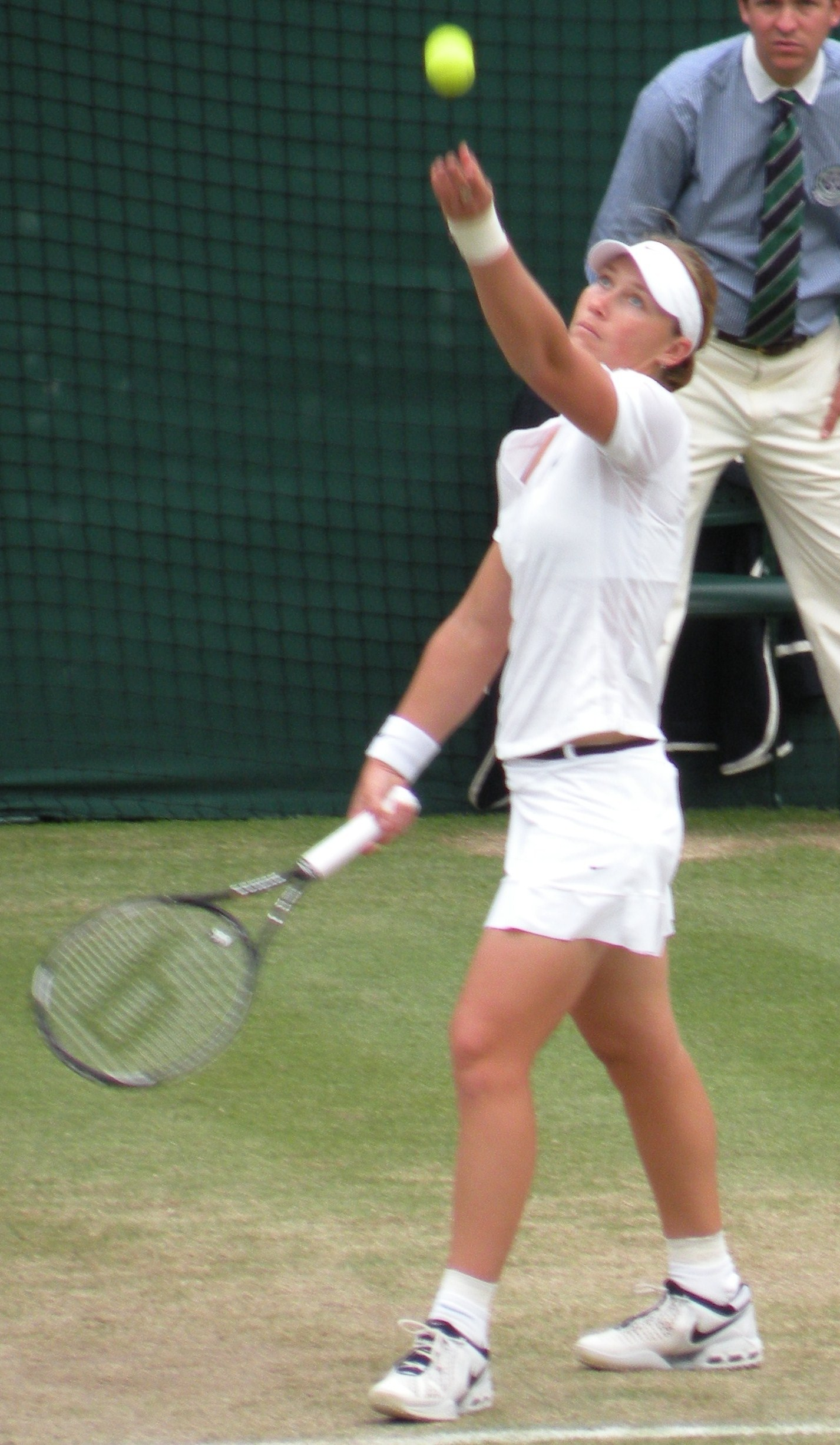
Stosur at Wimbledon, 2008

She returned playing two ITF events before the Rome Masters in May, where she was defeated in the second round by Venus Williams. The tournament also saw the return of the doubles team of Stosur and Lisa Raymond with a second-round loss. Less than a month later, they were defeated in the third round of the French Open, where Stosur reached the second round in singles, losing to Petra Kvitová.

Stosur showed great promise at Wimbledon: while only making the second round in singles, losing to Nicole Vaidišová, she made the finals of both the ladies' and mixed doubles. She and Raymond lost the final to Venus and Serena Williams. The Williams sisters had just played against each other in the final of the ladies singles. With mixed-doubles partner Bob Bryan, Stosur defeated Mike Bryan and Katarina Srebotnik to win the title.

At the Beijing Olympics, Stosur was defeated in the second round of the singles tournament by fourth seed Serena Williams. In doubles, Stosur (formerly ranked No. 1) partnered Rennae Stubbs, ranked No. 5 at the time; however, the pair were unseeded because the ITF determined the seedings for the doubles competition based on both singles and doubles rankings standings. The pair lost in the second round to the Spanish team of Anabel Medina Garrigues and Virginia Ruano Pascual, who were then ranked No. 2.

At the US Open, Stosur lost in the first round of singles to seventh seed Venus Williams. She and Mahesh Bhupathi were eliminated in the second round of the mixed-doubles competition by Stubbs and Robert Lindstedt. Raymond and Stosur were runners-up in the women's doubles event, losing to the top-ranked team of Cara Black and Liezel Huber.

By the end of the year, Stosur was ranked No. 52 in singles, 110 spots above her ranking in June. In spite of missing the first 4½ months of the tour, Raymond and Stosur finished the season as the seventh team at the Race to the Tour Championships, with Stosur ranked No. 14 in doubles, 156 positions higher than she was when she returned to playing on the ITF Circuit.

=== 2009: Singles breakthrough ===
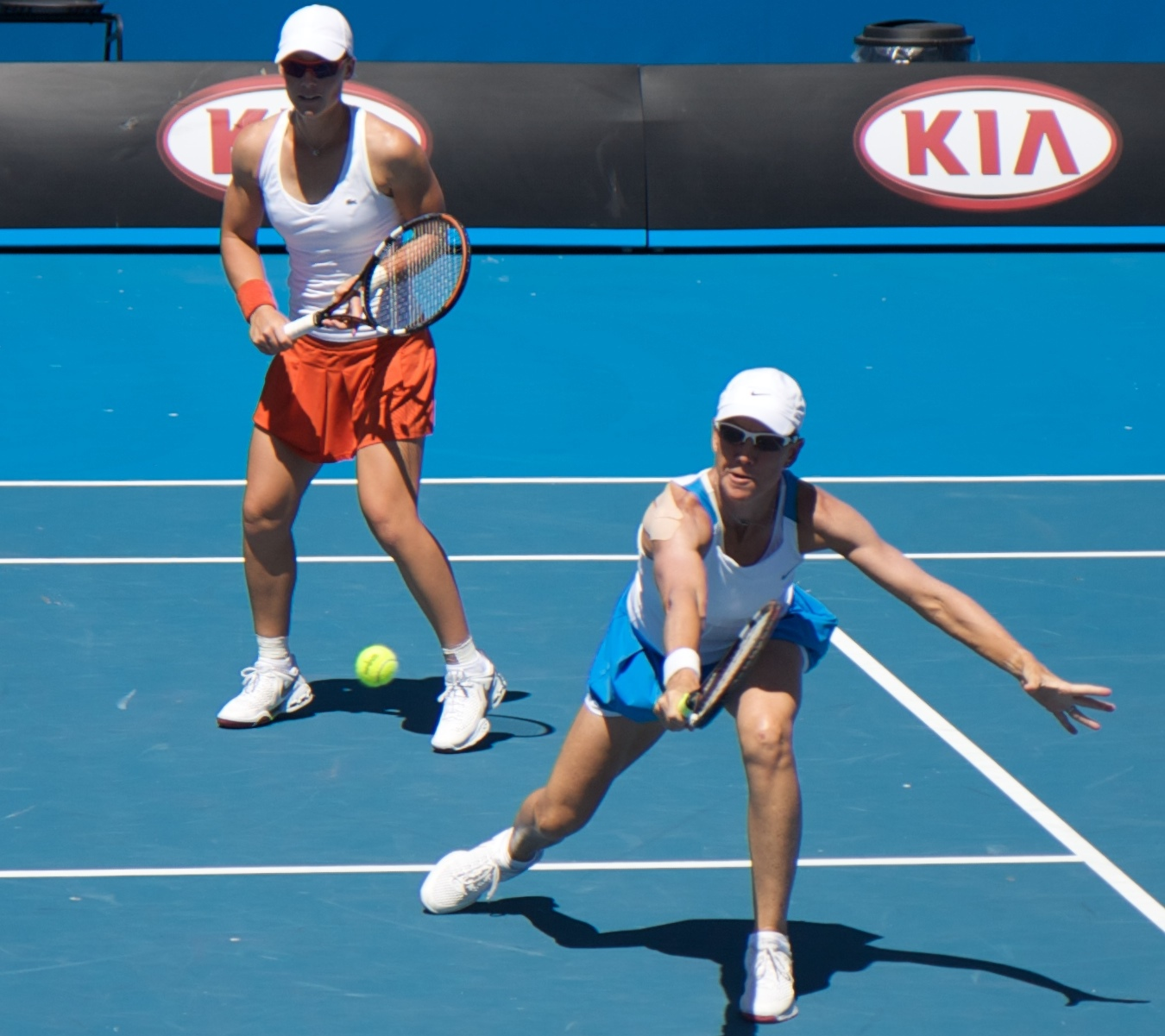
Stosur (left) with doubles partner Rennae Stubbs at the 2009 Australian Open

In her first tournament of the year, Stosur fell to Lucie Šafářová in the second round of the Brisbane International. At the Medibank International, she was defeated by top-seed Serena Williams in a close three-set match. Seeded fourth in doubles, the pair of Stosur and Rennae Stubbs lost to Peng Shuai and Hsieh Su-wei in the first round of the tournament. Stosur defeated Klára Zakopalová and Sabine Lisicki before losing in the third round to world No. 4, Elena Dementieva, at the Australian Open. She also won through to the third round in doubles, partnering Stubbs, defeating the Radwańska sisters. However, they then lost to eventual champions Venus and Serena Williams. In the Fed Cup Asia/Oceanic Zone competition, Stosur won four matches against various opponents from South Korea, Thailand, and Chinese Taipei. The Australian team, which also included Casey Dellacqua and Jelena Dokić, advanced to the World Group II play-offs, winning all of its twelve rubbers.

At the Dubai Championships, Stosur defeated Magdaléna Rybáriková in straight sets before losing in the second round to Zheng Jie after winning the first set. Together with Stubbs, she was ousted in the semifinals of the doubles competition by the world-number-one team of Cara Black and Liezel Huber. In Indian Wells, Stosur defeated Francesca Schiavone in the first round before she was eliminated in the second round by seventh seed Agnieszka Radwańska in three sets. In doubles, Stosur and Stubbs lost to Vera Zvonareva and Victoria Azarenka in the second round. At the Miami Open, Stosur defeated Sofia Arvidsson and Sybille Bammer before having the biggest win of her career against world No. 2, Dinara Safina, in the third round. Safina would have reached the No. 1 ranking had she won the match. Stosur then defeated former world No. 1, Amélie Mauresmo, in the fourth round. She lost to Victoria Azarenka in the quarter-finals. She reached the same round in doubles, losing to Anna-Lena Grönefeld and Patty Schnyder. Due to her results, Stosur's singles ranking rose from No. 43 to No. 31.

At the MPS Group Championships in Ponte Vedra Beach, Stosur was eliminated in the first round by second seed and eventual champion, Caroline Wozniacki. She then played for the Australian Fed Cup team in Mildura. Australia played Switzerland in the World Group II playoff. Stosur won the opening rubber of the tie in straight sets, then sealed the victory for Australia in the third rubber with a tight three-set victory, improving her 2009 Fed Cup singles record to 6–0. With this result, the Australian team advanced to the World Group II in 2010.

In the clay-court season, Stosur was eliminated in the first round of the Rome Masters by qualifier Yaroslava Shvedova, and was also defeated in her first match in doubles. She then competed at the Madrid Open, where she upset tenth seed Agnieszka Radwańska in the first round, but fell to Anna Chakvetadze in the second. Stosur and Stubbs made it to the semifinals, but were defeated by the world-No.-1 team of Black and Huber. At the French Open, they fell in the third round to 16th seeds Yan Zi and Zheng Jie. In singles, Stosur defeated Francesca Schiavone in the first round and Yanina Wickmayer in the second. She then beat fourth seed Elena Dementieva in the third round and Virginie Razzano of France for a place in the quarter-finals, where she defeated Sorana Cîrstea and advanced to her first Grand Slam semifinal against seventh seed Svetlana Kuznetsova, becoming the first Australian woman to reach the French Open semifinals since Nicole Provis in 1988. After losing the first set, Stosur fought back a break of serve to win the second set in a tiebreak, but lost in the final set to the eventual champion. This made her the lowest-ranked seed in the tournament to reach the furthest. With this result, Stosur cracked the top 20 for the first time in her career.

Stosur started the grass-court season playing at the Eastbourne International. She defeated Sabine Lisicki in the first round, before losing in the second round to sixth seed and eventual champion Wozniacki. Having beaten Black and Huber in the semifinals, she was a runner-up in the doubles tournament, losing the final to Ai Sugiyama and Akgul Amanmuradova with Stubbs. As the 18th seed at Wimbledon, Stosur defeated Bethanie Mattek-Sands and Tatjana Maria (then T. Malek), before losing in the third round to 13th seed Ana Ivanovic. In ladies' doubles, Stosur reached her second consecutive final, this time partnering Stubbs. The third seeds beat second seeds Anabel Medina Garrigues and Virginia Ruano Pascual in three sets in the semifinals, but were defeated in the final by fourth seeds Venus and Serena Williams in straight sets. Stosur was also defending the mixed-doubles title with Bob Bryan, but the second seeds were defeated in the quarter-finals by ninth seeds and eventual champions Anna-Lena Grönefeld and Mark Knowles.

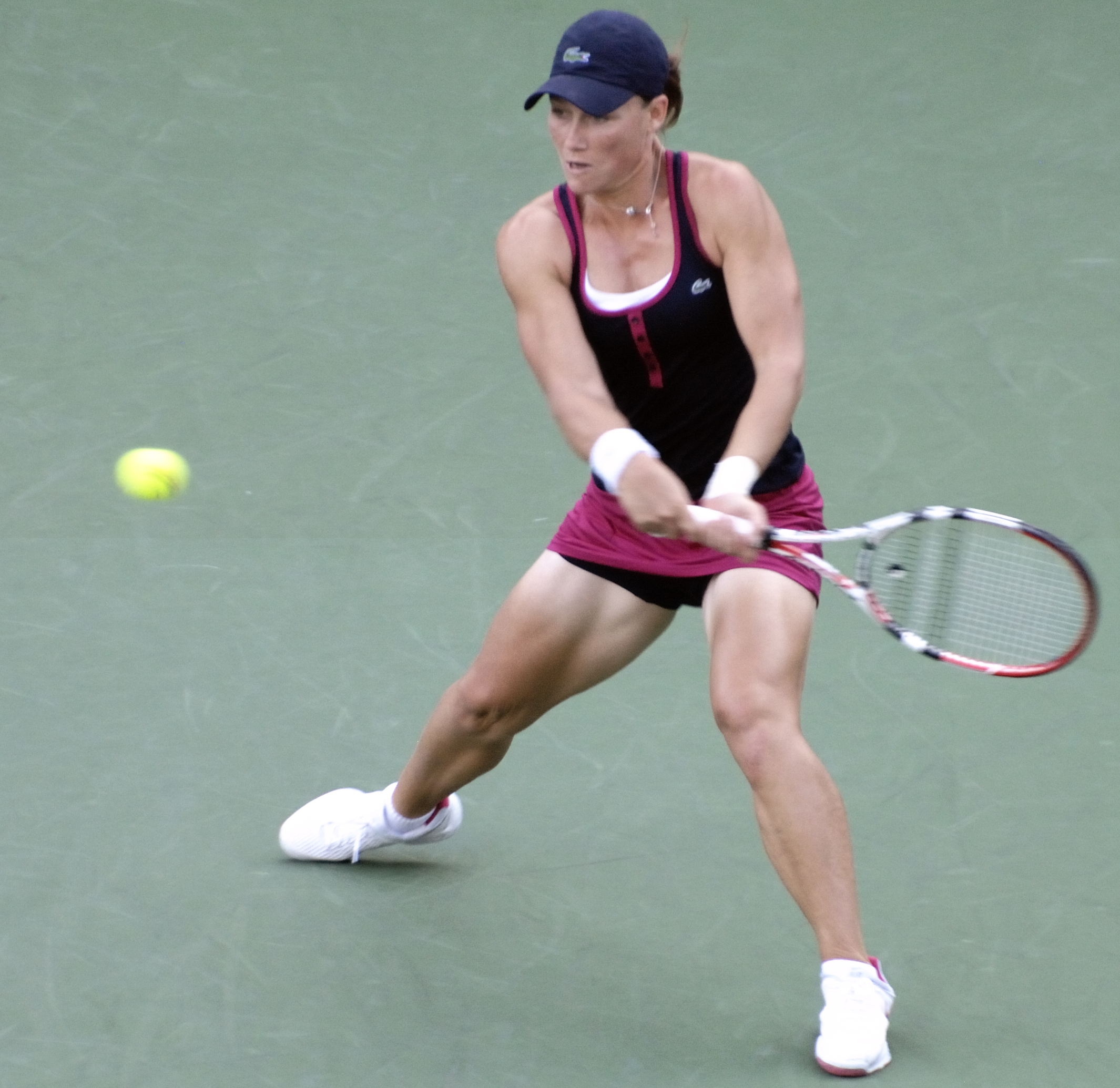
Stosur at the 2009 US Open

On the US Open Series in Stanford, Stosur made it into the semifinals after defeating sixth seed Dominika Cibulková, Monica Niculescu and causing a massive upset win over Serena Williams. She lost to eighth seed Marion Bartoli in three sets. Stosur then competed at the LA Championships as the No. 13 seed where she made it to her fifth WTA Tour final after defeating Monica Niculescu, Maria Kirilenko, Ana Ivanovic and Zheng Jie. She lost the final to tenth seed Flavia Pennetta. At her next tournament in Toronto, she defeated Heidi El Tabakh, sixth seed Kuznetsova and Virginie Razzano before being eliminated by fourth seed and eventual champion Elena Dementieva in the quarter-finals in three sets. At the same tournament, Stosur and Stubbs defeated Black and Huber in the semifinals but lost to Nuria Llagostera Vives and María José Martínez Sánchez in the final. With these results, Stosur improved her ranking to a career-high No. 15 in singles just in time for the US Open, where she was seeded accordingly. She opened with a three-set win over Ai Sugiyama before losing to American wildcard Vania King in the second round. Stosur entered the doubles event with compatriot Stubbs. As the third seeds, they made the semifinals without dropping a set, where they faced first seeds Black and Huber. They won the first set, but lost the next two after a two-day rain interruption.

At the Pan Pacific Open, Stosur won her opening round over Alexa Glatch but was defeated by Maria Sharapova in the second round with Sharapova dropping just one game. Seeded 15th at the China Open, Stosur lost a three-setter to Alizé Cornet. Stosur then played in Osaka as the third seed. Stosur reached final after defeating Alexandra Panova, Akiko Morigami, Jill Craybas and Wozniacki. Stosur captured her first-ever WTA title by beating Francesca Schiavone in the final in just over an hour. This win secured her a spot at the Tournament of Champions held in Bali. She also qualified for the doubles event, partnering compatriot Stubbs. They lost a hard-fought semifinals match against No. 1 seeds Black and Huber. Stosur was one of only two players on tour who played at both year-end championships. The other one was María José Martínez Sánchez, who was in Stosur's group for the round-robin stage with Ágnes Szávay. Stosur won her first match against Szávay in three sets but lost her second to Martínez Sánchez. This loss cost her a semifinal spot as Martínez Sánchez won both round-robin matches.

=== 2010: World's top ten and first singles Grand Slam final ===
Alongside Lleyton Hewitt, Stosur represented Australia at the Hopman Cup. The Australians were the top seeds. Their first tie was against Romania, where Stosur lost to Sorana Cîrstea in a three-setter, and then lost in the mixed doubles. The next tie was against the US, where Stosur beat Melanie Oudin in straight sets. Hewitt also won his singles match against John Isner, sealing the tie. In mixed doubles, Hewitt-Stosur lost. To advance to the final, Australia needed to win their tie against Spain 3–0. This result was, however, reversed, Australia losing to Spain 0–3. Stosur's last preparation tournament prior to the Australian Open was the Medibank International where she lost to Flavia Pennetta in the first round. Stosur was guaranteed a seeding of 13 for the Australian Open. She lost against world No. 1 and defending champion, Serena Williams, in two sets. Despite the loss, she moved up to a career-high ranking of No. 11. She played with Nadia Petrova in the doubles event of the Australian Open. They were seeded fifth, but lost to another Russia-Australian duo, Vera Dushevina and Anastasia Rodionova in the first round. She then travelled to Adelaide to represent Australia at the Fed Cup alongside Alicia Molik, Casey Dellacqua and Rennae Stubbs against Spain. Stosur won both of her singles matches by beating María José Martínez Sánchez and Anabel Medina Garrigues. Stosur and Stubbs also won their doubles match, gifting Australia a 3–2 win in the tie.

Her next tournament was the Dubai Championships where she was seeded ninth. Stosur was defeated in the opening round, at the hands of veteran Tathiana Garbin. She had better success in the doubles partnering Petrova. The pair was seeded fourth and reached the semifinals after receiving a first-round bye, then a walkover, and a win against fifth seeds Alisa Kleybanova and Francesca Schiavone. Seeded eighth at the BNP Paribas Open, Stosur received a first-round bye. In the quarter-finals, she defeated 12th seed and defending champion Vera Zvonareva, to move through to her first semifinal at the tournament, where she lost to eventual champion Jelena Janković in straight sets, with Stosur making 47 unforced errors in the match. With her success, she reached a career-high ranking of No. 10, making her only the third Australian woman to achieve this feat in ten years, after Jelena Dokić reached No. 4 in 2002 and Alicia Molik reached No. 8 in 2005. In doubles, Stosur was third seed with Petrova. They had a comfortable route to the final, dropping only one set, where they lost to Květa Peschke and Katarina Srebotnik. Stosur's next tournament was the Miami Open, where she was seeded ninth which allowed her a bye in the first round. She lost in the quarter-finals to eventual champion Kim Clijsters. In the doubles draw, Stosur and Petrova were seeded third and reached the final without dropping a set. However, Stosur and Petrova were defeated in the second straight final, losing in a super-tiebreak 7–10 to Gisela Dulko and Pennetta.

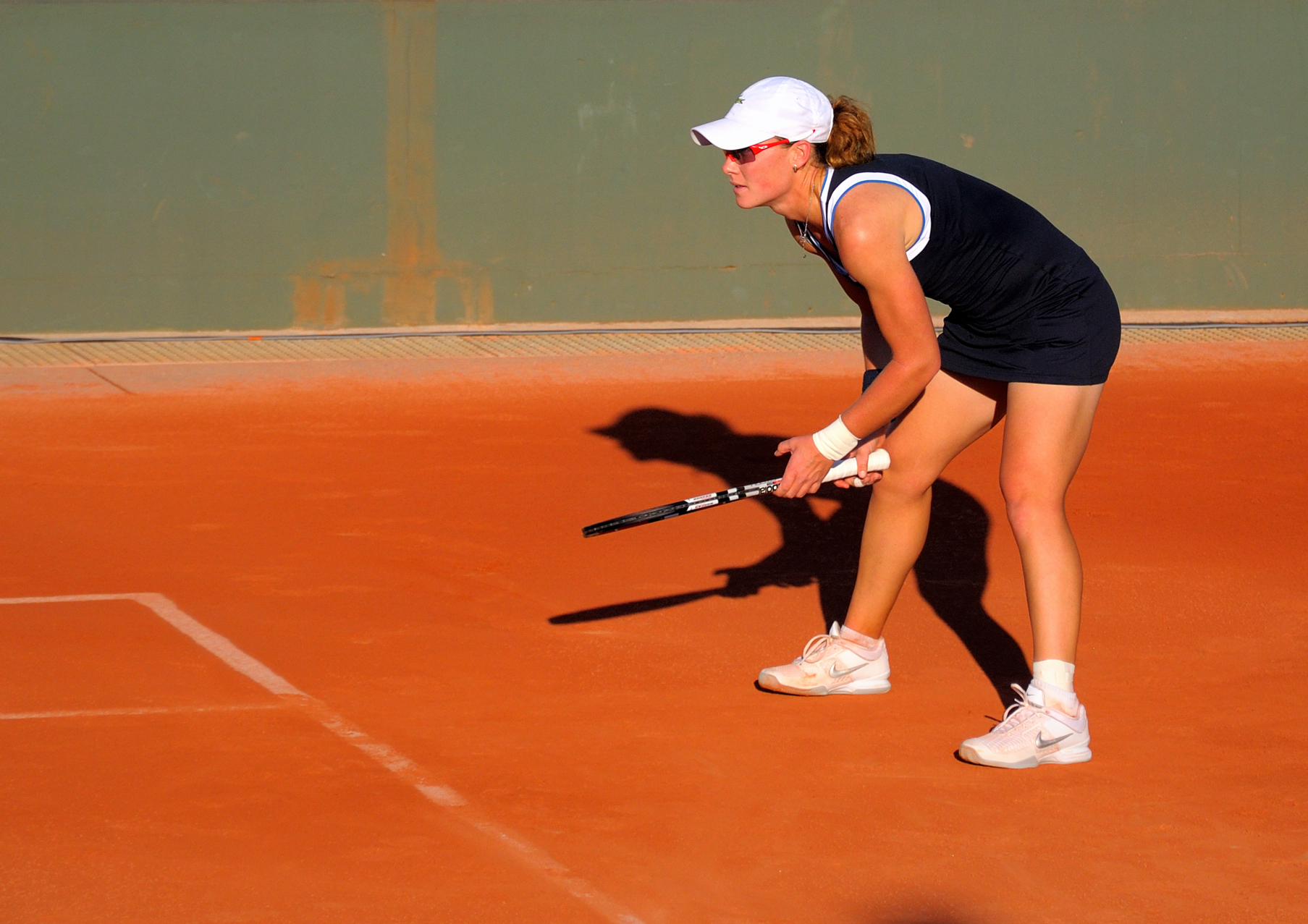
Stosur reached her first singles major final at the French Open

Stosur began her clay-court season at the Charleston Open, where she was seeded fourth. In the final, she defeated Zvonareva in straight sets, for her fifth consecutive victory over the Russian. With this, she won her second and biggest WTA Tour title, which put her back inside the top ten at world No. 10. She is the only Australian woman to have won this title. Stosur competed in the World Group play-offs in Ukraine. After the first day, the Aussies had a commanding lead, going 2–0 against Ukraine. This was helped by a win from Stosur against Mariya Koryttseva, and Anastasia Rodionova's win over Alona Bondarenko. Stosur then secured victory for Australia with a two-sets win over Lyudmyla Kichenok. Because of this, Australia played in the World Group in 2011 against the top-seed Italy. Stosur then competed at the Porsche Grand Prix in Stuttgart. Her 11-game winning streak was ended by former world No. 1, Justine Henin, in the final in three sets. Despite this result, Stosur reached a new career-high ranking of world No. 8.

Her next scheduled tournament was the Italian Open; however, Stosur had to withdraw due to fatigue. With this, her next scheduled tournament was the Madrid Open. In the quarter-finals, Stosur was broken multiple times by Venus Williams, losing 3–6, 3–6. In doubles, Stosur resumed her partnership with Petrova as third seeds with a first-round bye. However, they were knocked out in the second round by Anastasia Rodionova and Patty Schnyder. Coming into the French Open, Stosur was seeded seventh and was one of the favourites to win the title, due to her semifinal run in 2009 and her tour-best 14–2 record on clay in 2010. She was drawn in the same quarter as Henin, Maria Sharapova and Serena Williams, which was dubbed the toughest section of the draw. Becoming the first Australian woman to reach a Grand Slam singles final since Wendy Turnbull at the 1980 Australian Open, she was the favourite for the title, by dispatching three consecutive former world-number-ones and favourites for the title Henin, Serena Williams and Jelena Janković, but was upset by Francesca Schiavone in the final.

In doubles, Stosur and her partner Petrova were the fourth seeds. They defeated Irina Pavlovic and Laura Thorpe in the first round, and Vania King and Michaëlla Krajicek in the second round. Their run came to an end at the hands of Ukrainian sisters Alona Bondarenko and Kateryna Bondarenko, when the fourth seeds retired trailing 1–6, 0–1. At the Aegon International in Eastbourne, Stosur was defeated in the semifinal by eventual champion Ekaterina Makarova, despite leading the first set 3–0 and having a chance to serve for that set at 5–3. But with her semifinals appearance she attained a new career high of world No. 6; also, she was ranked No. 1 in the race to the WTA Championships in Doha. Her next tournament was the Wimbledon Championships. As the sixth seed, Stosur fell in the first round to Kaia Kanepi in straight sets, after saving three match points. As the French Open champion Schiavone also lost in the first round, Stosur and Schiavone were the first two women in history who reached the French Open final, but failed to win a match at Wimbledon. Despite not winning a match, she received a new career-high ranking of world No. 5, due to Dementieva's withdrawal from the tournament due to injury. Stosur also played in the doubles event, hoping to have success similar to the previous year with then-partner Stubbs. She played with her 2010 partner Petrova as the third seeds, but lost in the third round to eventual champions, Vania King and Yaroslava Shvedova. She also competed in the mixed doubles event as first seeds with Nenad Zimonjić. They received a bye in the first round, and in the second round, they defeated Colin Fleming and Sarah Borwell. They then faced the Belgium duo Xavier Malisse and Clijsters, but lost in two sets.

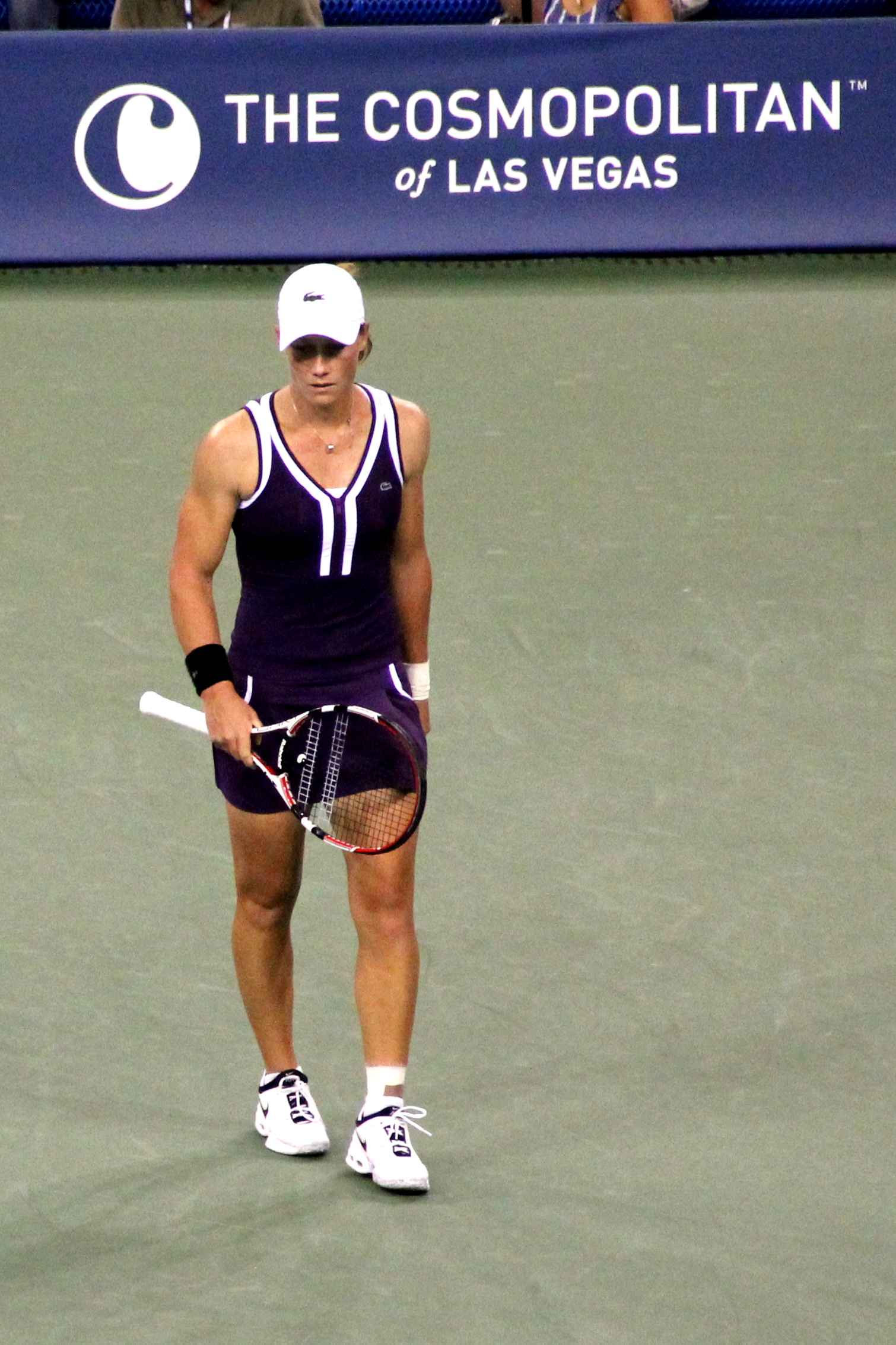
Stosur at the 2010 US Open

Stosur's next scheduled tournament was the Stanford Classic where she was the top-seed, but lost in a semifinal match-up with Victoria Azarenka. She then participated in the San Diego Open. As the second seed, she lost in the quarter-finals to Pennetta. Due to a shoulder injury, she withdrew from the Cincinnati Open and the Rogers Cup in Montreal. This meant that Stosur had only taken part in one of the five Premier-5 tournaments of the year. After taking time off to recover from her injury, she took part in the Pilot Pen Tennis tournament at New Haven, in hopes of regaining some of the lost ranking points and in preparation for the US Open. Stosur lost to Petrova in the quarter-finals. At the US Open, Stosur was seeded fifth. In her first US Open quarter-final, she was up a break in the third set, before falling to defending champion and second seed Clijsters in three sets. Stosur announced that she would not take part in the 2010 Commonwealth Games. Instead, she competed at the final Premier Mandatory event of the year, the China Open, where she lost in the first round to qualifier Anastasija Sevastova in three sets. Stosur qualified in singles for the year-ending WTA Championships in Doha for the first time in her career, following the withdrawal of Venus Williams.

Stosur then attempted to defend her title at the Japan Open as the top-seed, her only International tournament of the year. She lost against Kimiko Date-Krumm in the quarter-finals in a final-set tie-break, becoming the first top-ten player in WTA history to lose to an opponent over the age of 40. Stosur competed at the WTA Championships, where she was seeded fifth. Stosur was drawn in the Maroon Group alongside world No. 1, Caroline Wozniacki, world No. 6, Francesca Schiavone, and world No. 9, Elena Dementieva, seeded first, fourth and seventh, respectively, due to the Williams sisters' withdrawal. In her first match against Schiavone, she avenged her French Open final loss to the Italian by defeating her in straight sets, coming back from a 0–4 deficit in the first set. Her next opponent was world No. 1, Wozniacki. Stosur continued her dominant showing, recording a straight-sets win to secure her spot in the semifinals. She then fell to Elena Dementieva, but secured her spot in the semifinals by winning one set. Stosur finished in first position in her round-robin group, but lost to three-time US Open champion and world No. 4, Clijsters, in the semifinals. Stosur ended her year ranked No. 6. In addition, she was the only player in 2010 to defeat both current world No. 1 players, Serena Williams and Wozniacki. She also had the best percentage of points scored on second serve among her peers.

=== 2011: First major title at US Open and career-high ranking ===
Stosur began the new season by competing at the Brisbane International. She fell in straight sets to fellow Australian Jarmila Groth in the second round. After this tournament, Stosur competed at the Sydney International as the fourth seed. She lost in the second round to Svetlana Kuznetsova.

Stosur was seeded fifth at the Australian Open, where she lost in the third round to 25th seed Petra Kvitová. Stosur then rose to a new career high No. 4, following a quarter-final showing at the Dubai Championships. She had a disappointing start to the first American leg of the year, falling in the third round of the Indian Wells to Dinara Safina. In Miami, she was seeded fourth, but was defeated in straight sets in the fourth round by 16th seed and former No. 1, Maria Sharapova. After Miami, Stosur played at Charleston, where she failed to defend her title, falling in the third round to Elena Vesnina in two sets.

In Stuttgart, as fifth seed, Stosur lost to Julia Görges in the semifinals, but she won in the doubles tournament, partnering Sabine Lisicki, by defeating the German team of Kristina Barrois and Jasmin Wöhr in the final. Stosur's next tournament was the Madrid Open where she was the fifth seed. She lost in the third round to Anastasia Pavlyuchenkova in straight sets. She then competed in Rome where the sixth-seeded Stosur reached the final, but was beaten by seventh-seeded Sharapova. Stosur was seeded eighth at the French Open, yet was upset by Gisela Dulko, in the third round. As a result of this loss her ranking dropped to world No. 10.

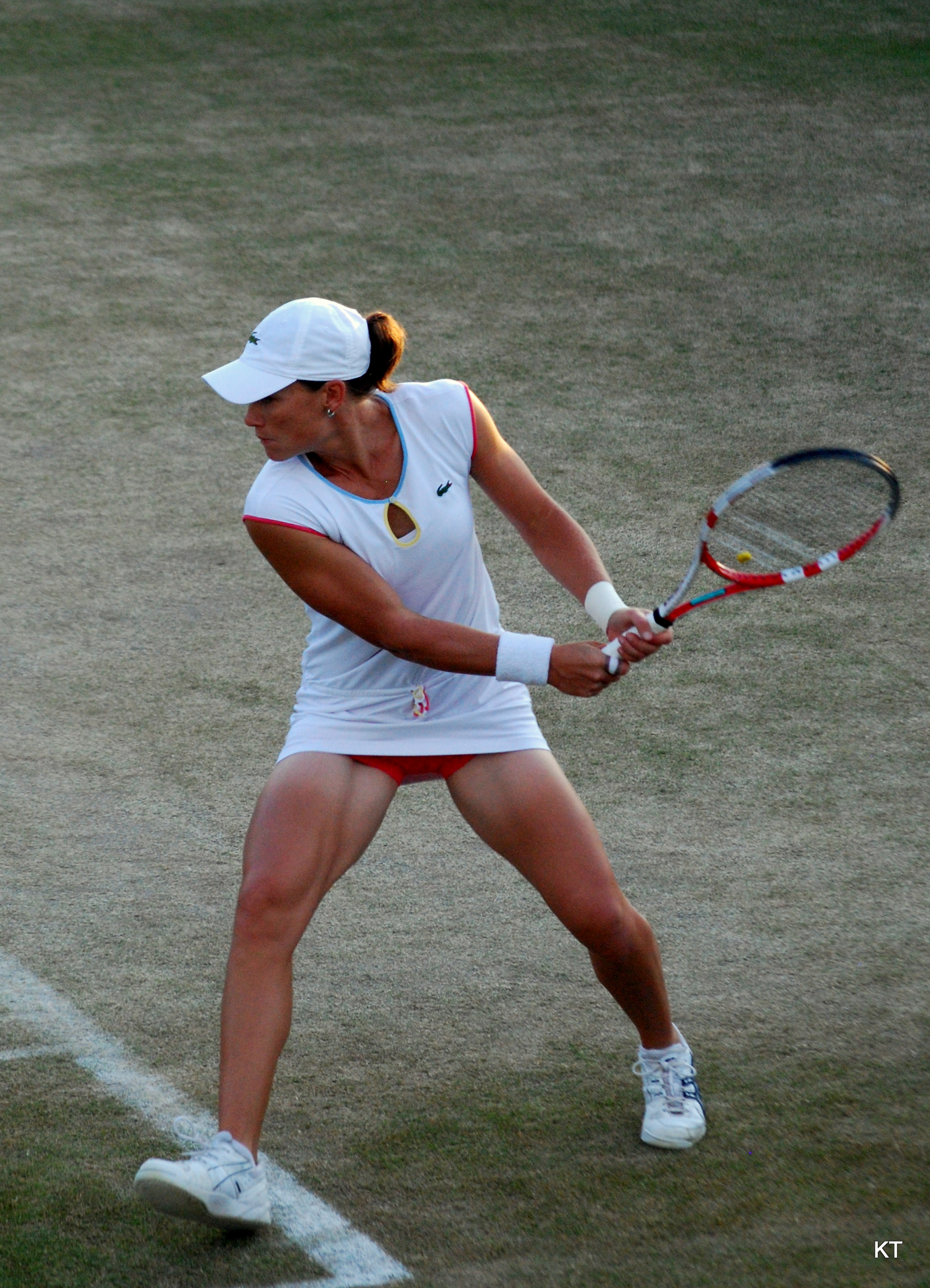
Stosur at Wimbledon, 2011

Stosur's next tournament was the Eastbourne International. She progressed to the semifinals, where she lost to Marion Bartoli. At Wimbledon, Stosur suffered a first-round loss to world No. 262, Melinda Czink. In mixed doubles, Stosur partnered with Mike Bryan, but lost in the first round. In ladies' doubles, Stosur partnered with Sabine Lisicki. Along the way, the pair upset the top seeds and defending champions Vania King and Yaroslava Shvedova in the second round. Stosur and Lisicki made it to the final, but lost in straight sets to Květa Peschke and Katarina Srebotnik.

Stosur began her US Open Series campaign with a straight-set loss to her doubles partner, Lisicki, in the second round of Bank of the West Classic. However, Stosur bounced back at the Rogers Cup in Toronto by reaching the final, having defeated Li Na and Agnieszka Radwańska along the way. Stosur was defeated by Serena Williams in the final in two sets. She then competed in the Cincinnati Open where she defeated qualifier Eleni Daniilidou in the first round. She would then face Serena Williams for the second week in a row in the second round. However, Williams withdrew because of a toe injury, resulting in a walkover for Stosur. In the third round, she defeated fifth seed Li Na for the second time in two weeks in three sets. She then faced Sharapova in the quarter-finals and lost in straight sets. Stosur was seeded ninth at the US Open, and she drew Sofia Arvidsson in the first round and defeated her in straight sets. In the second round, she defeated American CoCo Vandeweghe. The third round was one of Stosur's hardest matches against Nadia Petrova, finally prevailing in three sets after a 3-hour-16-minute battle, in what was the longest women's singles match in the tournament's history until the record was broken by Johanna Konta and Garbiñe Muguruza four years later in 2015. She played Maria Kirilenko in the fourth round and won in three sets. The second-set tiebreak, which reached 15–17, was the longest in any major in the history of women's tennis. She then beat second seed Vera Zvonareva, to reach the semifinals for the first time. Stosur followed this milestone with a three-sets win over German player Angelique Kerber to reach her first US Open singles final, where she defeated three-time champion Serena Williams, for her first Grand Slam tournament singles title, the first by an Australian woman since Evonne Goolagong won Wimbledon in 1980.

Stosur suffered two second-round losses at the Pan Pacific Open and the China Open, both to Maria Kirilenko. However, on 9 October 2011 it was announced that Stosur had qualified for the year-ending WTA Championships in Istanbul. Stosur was runner-up at the HP Open where she was defeated by second seed Marion Bartoli in the final. Along the way she defeated Noppawan Lertcheewakarn, Misaki Doi, seventh seed Chanelle Scheepers and Zheng Jie. Stosur was placed in the white group for the Tour Championships. Her first match was against second seed Sharapova, winning the match in two sets. In this match, not only did Stosur cause an upset against the second seed, she won her first match against the Russian after losing to Sharapova in their previous nine encounters. In addition, Stosur has won six of her last seven matches against current top-2 players. (The only loss against a current top-2 player at that time was against world No. 1, Serena Williams, in the 2010 Australian Open.) In Stosur's second round-robin match, she lost to fourth seed Victoria Azarenka. This was her fifth loss against Azarenka and has yet to win a single set from Azarenka. Stosur beat fifth seed Li Na for the loss of one game in her final round-robin match to advance to the semifinals for the second straight year, where she met maroon group winner Petra Kvitová for a spot in the final. She lost the match in three sets, despite being 7–5, 1–0 up with a breakpoint to go 2–0. Despite the loss, this was the first time Stosur won a set against Kvitová. Kvitová went on to defeat Azarenka in the final, making it the second consecutive year that Stosur lost to the eventual champion in the semifinals. Because of her performance at the WTA Championships, Stosur replaced Vera Zvonareva as the world No. 6, and finished the season ranked No. 6 for the second straight year.

=== 2012: Continued success ===
Seeded first, Stosur started the year by losing in the second round of the Brisbane International to Iveta Benešová. She then suffered two first-round defeats at the hands of Francesca Schiavone at the Sydney International, and then by Sorana Cîrstea, at the Australian Open. Stosur admitted that she could not cope under the heavy weight of home expectations, especially after winning the US Open. Despite the result, Stosur's ranking remained at No. 5 due to her not having many ranking points to defend and Li Na failing to defend her finalist points from the Australian Open. Stosur then travelled to Fribourg to represent Australia in their Fed Cup tie against Switzerland. She won both of her singles rubbers against Timea Bacsinszky and Stefanie Vögele.

Stosur then competed at the Qatar Ladies Open in Doha. She was seeded third and avenged her loss in the first round of the Australian Open by defeating Sorana Cîrstea in the second round; she eventually lost in the final to current world No. 1, Victoria Azarenka, who had not lost a match (17–0) to that point in 2012. Her second Middle-East tournament was the Dubai Championships, where she defeated Lucie Šafářová in the second round in three sets, but for the second straight year she lost to former world No. 1, Jelena Janković. Stosur then travelled to the United States to compete in the Indian Wells Open, where she defeated young American Irina Falconi, to make the third round, where she lost a very tough match to Nadia Petrova. Then at the Miami Open, Stosur made the quarter-finals after a big comeback from a set and 2–5 down to defeat Chanelle Scheepers. Serena Williams got revenge on Stosur for the 2011 US Open final by defeating her in straight sets.

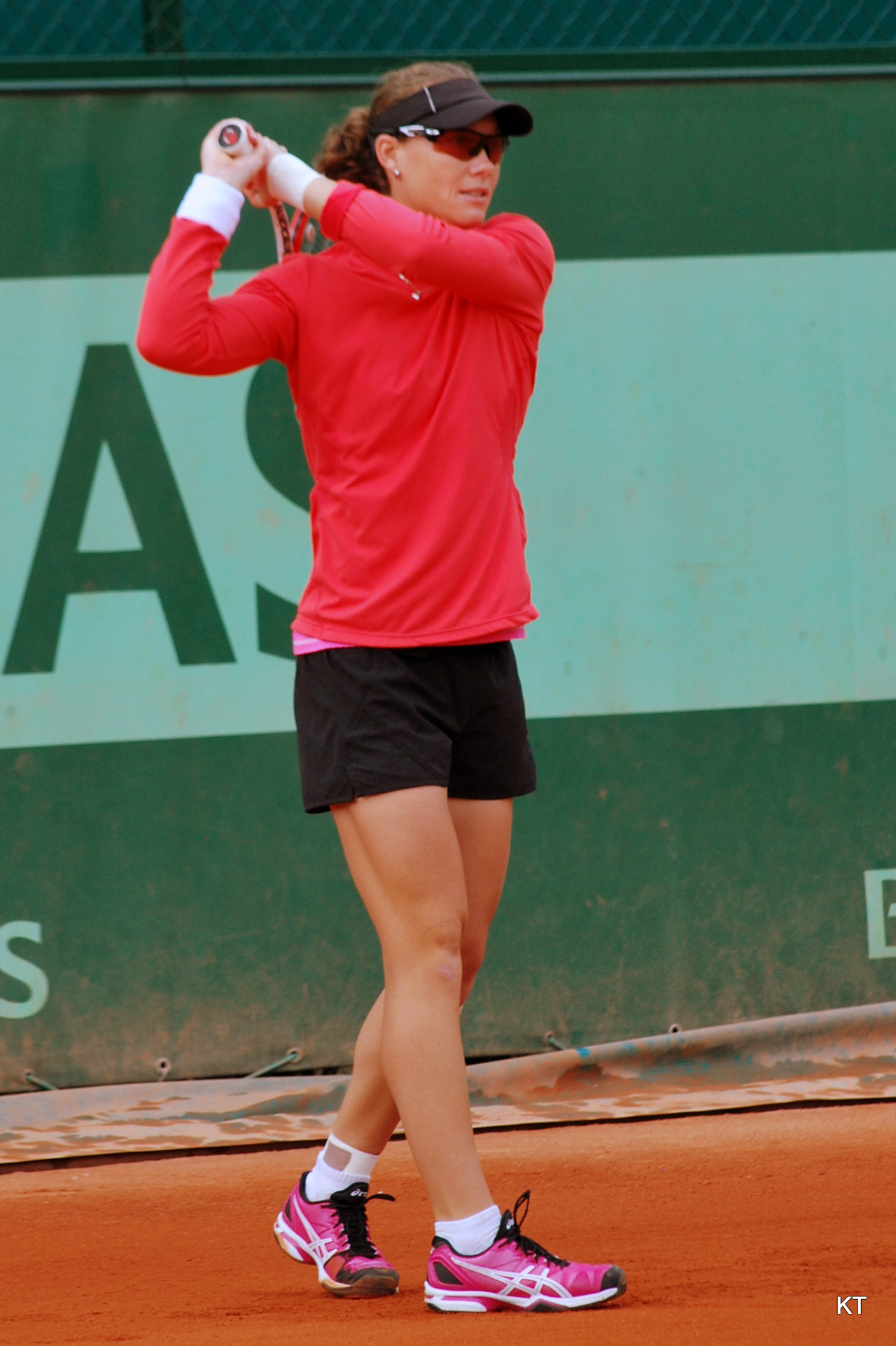
Stosur practising before her third-round match with Nadia Petrova

At the Family Circle Cup in Charleston, Stosur entered the tournament as second seed and had a first-round bye. She defeated wildcard Jamie Hampton in the second round and Galina Voskoboeva in the third round. In the quarter-finals, Stosur defeated Venus Williams for the first time after losing to her in the previous four encounters. However, Stosur's run ended in the semifinals, where she lost to eventual champion Serena Williams. After this, Stosur made her way to Stuttgart, where she won both her singles matches against Germany in the World Group play-offs. She defeated two top-20 players, Angelique Kerber, the same player who Stosur faced in the 2011 US Open semifinal, and Andrea Petkovic, for their first encounter. At the Porsche Tennis Grand Prix, Stosur reached the quarter-finals by defeating the defending champion Julia Görges in three sets. She lost in the quarter-finals to Maria Sharapova, despite holding a match point in the second set. She next played at the Madrid Open, defeated Petra Martić in a third set tiebreak and Christina McHale in the first two rounds on the blue clay courts. Stosur's third-round opponent was Petra Cetkovská. Stosur won the match in straight sets to reach the quarter-finals, where she lost a tight match to Lucie Hradecká in two tiebreaks. Her final tournament before the French Open was the Italian Open, where she defeated Sara Errani to make the third round, where she lost to Venus Williams.

At the French Open, as the sixth seed, Stosur advanced to the quarter-finals without dropping a set. She defeated Petrova in the third round, and then outplayed Sloane Stephens in straight sets. She defeated Dominika Cibulková in two sets to reach her third French Open semifinal losing to Sara Errani in three sets.

Stosur lost her second-round match against Arantxa Rus at Wimbledon. In the London 2012 Olympics, Stosur lost in the first round to Carla Suárez Navarro. Stosur won the first set but lost the second and then the third set 8–10. Stosur played mixed doubles with former world No. 1, Lleyton Hewitt. They reached the quarter-finals together, but lost to crowd favourites Andy Murray and Laura Robson, who were competing for Great Britain.

At the Western & Southern Open in Cincinnati, Stosur entered the tournament as the third seed. Stosur had a bye in the first round, and she played Anabel Medina Garrigues in the second round winning in three sets. She played Ekaterina Makarova in the second round, comfortably prevailing in two sets. In the quarter-finals, Stosur played wildcard and former world No. 1, Venus Williams, who won in three sets. Defending a Grand Slam title for the first time, Stosur comfortably made it through the first three rounds at the US Open against Petra Martić, Edina Gallovits-Hall, and 31st seed Varvara Lepchenko. Stosur only lost 13 games in the first three rounds. She was then up against rising star Laura Robson. Robson had defeated Kim Clijsters and Li Na en route to the fourth round. Stosur comfortably defeated Robson in straight sets but lost in the quarter-finals to world No. 1, Victoria Azarenka, in a thrilling three-set showdown, which is regarded as the match of the championships. She succumbed seven points to five in the final-set tiebreaker and was two points away from clinching victory. It was the first time Stosur had ever taken a set of Azarenka. Despite not defending the title, Stosur did win the inaugural US Open Sportsmanship Award.

Her next tournament was the Pan Pacific Open. As the eighth seed, Stosur had a bye in the first round, and played Francesca Schiavone in the second round, winning in a three-set battle. She defeated 12th seed Dominika Cibulková in the third round in two sets. In the quarter-finals, she beat world No. 2, Maria Sharapova, in straight sets, causing a huge upset—considering Stosur had only beaten Sharapova once in eleven matches. However, Stosur lost the semifinal to former doubles partner and eventual champion Petrova, in straight sets.

=== 2013: Struggles with form ===
She started her year at the Brisbane International where she was seeded seventh. Before the tournament started, Stosur admitted that she had only ten days of practice on court since surgery to remove a spur from her left ankle. This was just six weeks prior to the first-round match. Stosur lost in the first round to Sofia Arvidsson where she committed 48 unforced errors. Stosur played Zheng Jie in the first round at the Sydney International, where she was seeded sixth. She lost in a tight three-set battle. It was Stosur's fifth consecutive loss in Australia; however, she broke a nine-set losing streak in the country by winning the second set. At the Australian Open, where she was seeded ninth, Stosur broke her Australian hoodoo, by defeating Chang Kai-chen in the first round in a straight sets win. However, she lost in the second round to Zheng Jie for the second straight tournament despite being up 5–2 up in the third set.

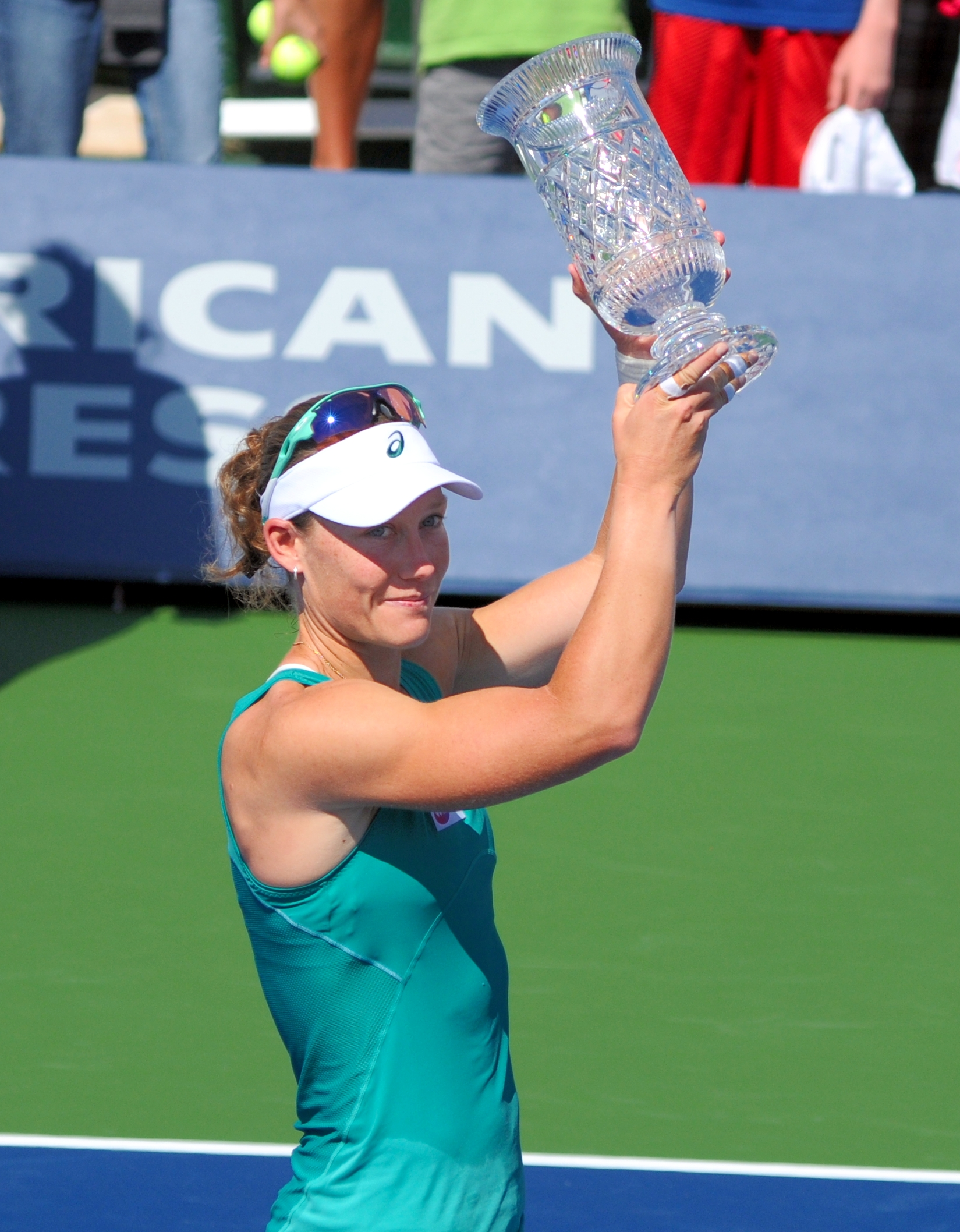
Stosur wins the Southern California Open in 2013

Stosur bounced back from a poor start to the season to win her second-round match at the Qatar Ladies Open over Monica Niculescu in three sets. She then defeated Svetlana Kuznetsova to reach the quarter-finals. Stosur went on to lose the quarter-final match against Sharapova. She then competed at the Dubai Championships, where she was seeded seventh. She opened her campaign with a two set victory over Ekaterina Makarova and then moved into the quarterfinals after defeating Hsieh Su-wei. For the second week in a row Stosur lost in the quarterfinals but this time she was shocked by Roberta Vinci in straight sets.

She then left to the United States where she played at the Indian Wells tournament. After a bye in the first round, she defeated young wildcard Madison Keys. Stosur then struggled past 32nd seed Peng Shuai in three sets. into the fourth round where she recovered from a set down to defeat 24th seed Mona Barthel. In the final game of the fourth round, she injured her right calf and was forced to forfeit the quarterfinal match against Angelique Kerber. The injury forced Stosur to pull out of the Miami Open. She successfully returned to the court at the Family Circle Cup where she opened her campaign in the second round with a straight-sets win over Marina Erakovic. During her third-round match, Stosur was forced to retire with her recurring calf injury against qualifier Eugenie Bouchard.

Stosur recovered to play in the Fed Cup World Group play-offs against Switzerland. She played in both singles rubbers against Stefanie Vögele and Romina Oprandi, winning both matches in straight sets and ensuring that Australia play in the 2014 Fed Cup World Group. Following the Fed Cup victory, Stosur recorded two first-round losses at the Stuttgart Grand Prix where she was the sixth seed against Jelena Janković. and at the Madrid Open where she was seeded ninth, to Carla Suárez Navarro. Following the disappointing loss in Madrid, Stosur moved on to the Italian Open and rebounded with her first win of the European clay season on her third attempt, comfortably defeating Hsieh Su-wei. She then won her second round match over Peng Shuai in straight sets. She then reached the quarterfinals in Rome with a three-set win over Petra Kvitová, the first time in Stosur's career she had beaten Kvitová. Stosur suffered her eighth straight loss to Victoria Azarenka in the quarterfinals losing in three sets.

At the French Open, Stosur won her opening match against Kimiko Date-Krumm after waiting 2½ hours to play because of rain. She then quickly won the opening first nine games and smashed 42-year-old Date-Krumm in two sets. Stosur then defeated Kristina Mladenovic in straight sets. Stosur then played 18th seed Jelena Janković in the third round. After winning the first set, Stosur lost the match in a tight battle. She was unable to defend her semifinal ranking points of 2012, and slipped out of the world's top 10. At Wimbledon, she reached the third round for only the second time in her career, after defeating lucky loser Anna Karolína Schmiedlová and Olga Puchkova both in straight sets. In the third round she lost to eventual finalist Sabine Lisicki in three sets. Stosur was stunned in the second round of the Stanford Classic by Olga Govortsova. She accepted a last-minute wildcard into the Southern California Open in Carlsbad where she opened with a win over Varvara Lepchenko. She then made her way through to the final defeating Sesil Karatantcheva in the second round, causing an upset to defeat Agnieszka Radwańska in the quarterfinals and recovering from 0–4 in the first set to defeat Virginie Razzano in the semifinals. Stosur went on to play Victoria Azarenka in the final. She previously had an 0–8 record against Azarenka. Stosur stunned Azarenka by cruising past her in straight sets. This was Stosur's first WTA Tour title since her win at the 2011 US Open.

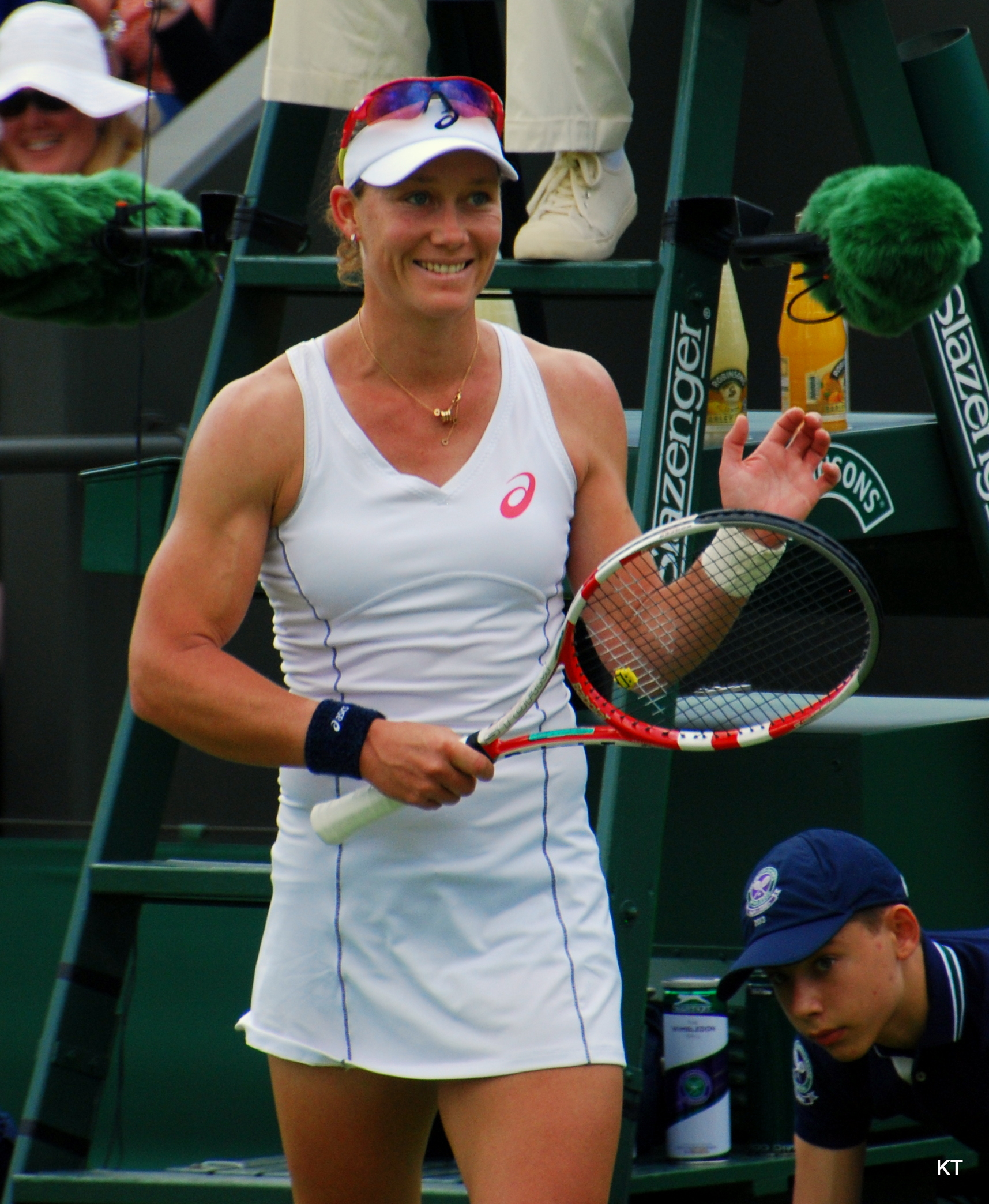
Stosur at the 2013 Wimbledon Championships

At the US Open, the 11th-seeded Stosur was stunned by the 296th-ranked American qualifier Victoria Duval in the first round going down in three sets. The loss meant, Stosur would drop out of the top 15 in the world rankings, and also meant that in 2013 she failed to reach the fourth round in any Grand Slam tournament.

Stosur bounced back from the US Open disappointment and opened her campaign at the Pan Pacific Open with a come-from-behind victory over Alizé Cornet in three sets. She then defeated 42-year-old home favourite Kimiko Date-Krumm. Stosur lost in the third round to Lucie Šafářová. Stosur moved onto the China Open in Beijing where she again had to face Šafářová. This time was in the first round, and Stosur suffered a similar result going down in straight sets. She played her final tournament in Asia at the Japan Women's Open in Osaka. As the third seed, she opened the tournament with a win over Johanna Larsson and then defeated current junior world number one Belinda Bencic. After racing through the first set, Stosur overcame the loss of the second set to defeat Misaki Doi in the quarterfinals. Stosur swept past Madison Keys and into the final after a powerful performance in which she held all of her service games and gave Keys barely a chance of progressing in her first WTA semifinal, winning in just over an hour. Stosur moved on to play Eugenie Bouchard in the final, taking 2 hours and 13 minutes to capture her fifth career title, coming from a set down to win. This was the second time she had won in Osaka. She then reached the final of the Kremlin Cup, after defeating Ana Ivanovic in the quarterfinals and Svetlana Kuznetsova in the semifinals. She lost to Simona Halep in the final. At the end of the season, Stosur parted company with her coach David Taylor and employed Miles Maclagan who had previously worked with Andy Murray and Laura Robson.

=== 2014: Second Wimbledon mixed-doubles title ===
Stosur started season at the Hopman Cup partnering Bernard Tomic. She lost to Agnieszka Radwańska, Eugenie Bouchard and Flavia Pennetta in all three of her singles matches, and subsequently the Australian pair did not qualify for the final. Stosur then played at the Hobart International, opting not to play at the Sydney International for the first time in five years. Stosur was the top-seed at the tournament. Stosur defeated Madison Brengle, Kristina Mladenovic and eighth seed Bojana Jovanovski en route to the semifinals, saving match point against Mladenovic. She lost to Klára Zakopalová in the semifinals in straight sets. Stosur next played at the Australian Open. In the first round, she played Klára Zakopalová, having played Zakopalová just three days prior; Stosur reversed the result winning in straight sets. In the second round, she defeated Sydney International champion Tsvetana Pironkova in straight sets. Stosur lost to 14th seed Ana Ivanovic in the third round despite being a set up. Ivanovic would then go on to make the quarterfinals, defeating world No. 1, Serena Williams, in the following round. Stosur then headed to Hobart to compete in 2014 Fed Cup World Group. She led Australia to a 4–0 victory against Russia. Stosur won the second and third singles rubbers in straight sets over Veronika Kudermetova and Victoria Kan.

She then competed at the Qatar Open where she was seeded 12th. Stosur won her first round over Marina Erakovic in straight sets. She lost to Jana Čepelová in the second round. Stosur then lost in the first round of the Dubai Championships against qualifier Annika Beck in three sets. Stosur then competed at Indian Wells where after receiving a first-round bye, she defeated Francesca Schiavone in straight sets. However, she lost to Flavia Pennetta in the third round. This was Stosur's fifth WTA Tour singles loss to Pennetta in her career. She dropped to world No. 20 after the tournament. Stosur was the 16th seed at Miami where she received a first-round bye. She then defeated qualifier Kiki Bertens in straight sets but lost to Vandeweghe in the next round. At the Madrid Open, she lost to the eventual champion Maria Sharapova in straight sets. At Rome, Stosur for first time lost to Li Na in straight sets, managing to win only four games in the full match and allowing Li Na to pass to quarterfinals very comfortably. At the French Open, Stosur was leading by one set and 4–3 in the second one but went on to lose all the games there after against the eventual champion, Maria Sharapova.

Ten days before the Wimbledon Championships, Stosur ended her coaching relationship with Maclagan, citing that she felt "change was needed". Stosur was defeated in the first round of Wimbledon by Yanina Wickmayer in straight sets. But in mixed doubles, she partnered with Nenad Zimonjić and won the title. En route to the final, they lost only one set in the third round, and in the final they beat Chan Hao-ching and Max Mirnyi in two sets. Stosur then travelled to Stanford where she was drawn against qualifier Naomi Osaka in the first round. The match was a tough battle but her opponent prevailed in the end. Stosur's next tournament was at the Rogers Cup. In the first round, Stosur was drawn against yet another qualifier, Monica Puig. She managed to defeat her opponent in straight sets. In the second round, she was drawn against top-seeded Serena Williams and lost in two sets.

=== 2015: 500th career win ===
Her first tournament in 2015 was Brisbane International, where she lost in the first round to Varvara Lepchenko despite leading 5–1 in the final set. In Sydney she reached the second round, where she lost to Barbora Záhlavová-Strýcová. Stosur then played at the Australian Open as the 20th seed. She defeated Monica Niculescu in straight sets, before losing in the second round to CoCo Vandeweghe.

In February, Stosur represented Australia in the Fed Cup against Germany. She lost both her matches against Andrea Petkovic and Angelique Kerber. Stosur next played at the Dubai where she lost in the second round to the third seed Caroline Wozniacki despite winning the first set. Her next tournament was the Doha where she was defeated by the eventual champion Lucie Šafářová in the first round. In Indian Wells, Stosur reached the third round, where she lost to Flavia Pennetta. In the doubles partnering Lisa Raymond, they reached the semifinal before losing to the pairing of Martina Hingis/Sania Mirza. Stosur next played at the Miami Open where she also lost in the third round to Venus Williams.

Stosur began her clay-court season by travelling to Charleston as the ninth seed where she lost in the second round to Lara Arruabarrena. Her next tournament was the Premier Mandatory in Madrid where she defeated the world No. 12 Angelique Kerber in the first round. She then played Kaia Kanepi and won in straight sets. She then lost in a close encounter to eventual finalist Svetlana Kuznetsova. Stosur next played at the Italian Open but lost in the first round to Anastasia Pavlyuchenkova. Stosur was awarded a wildcard at the Internationaux de Strasbourg and was the third seed. She crushed defending champion Monica Puig in straight sets. Stosur then received a walkover against Lesia Tsurenko and defeated fellow Aussie Ajla Tomljanović and Sloane Stephens to reach her first final of 2015. In the final, she faced Kristina Mladenovic and came from a set down to record a victory, and win her seventh title on the WTA Tour, her first on red clay. Stosur then played at the French Open as the 26th seed. She defeated Madison Brengle and Amandine Hesse, before losing to defending champion Sharapova in the third round.

Stosur started her grass-court season at Eastbourne where she was the 16th seed and therefore received a bye to the second round. She lost to Tsvetana Pironkova in straight sets. Stosur then played at Wimbledon where she defeated Danka Kovinić and Urszula Radwańska to equal her best showing at Wimbledon. In the third round, she lost to Vandeweghe in two sets. She also contested the women's doubles partnering Daniela Hantuchová, they fell in the second round to Dellacqua/Shvedova.

Stosur returned to clay courts, playing at the Swedish Open as the second seed. She was defeated in the second round by Lara Arruabarrena. Stosur then played at the Gastein Ladies as the second seed where she won her second title of 2015. Stosur defeated Sevastova, Koukalová, Schmiedlová and Karin Knapp in the final.

Stosur then started her hardcourt season in Washington where she reached the semifinals after defeating Mladenovic, Falconi and Niculescu before losing to eventual champion Sloane Stephens. Stosur then lost in the first round to Daria Gavrilova at the Rogers Cup. Following this, she again lost in the first round but this time to Tímea Babos at the Western & Southern Open. Stosur then played at the US Open and reached the fourth round at the US Open for the first time since 2012. In the first round she got revenge on Tímea Babos, to whom she lost the previous week. She backed this up with wins over Evgeniya Rodina and 16th-seeded Sara Errani. She then lost to eventual champion Flavia Pennetta.

=== 2016: Another Grand Slam semifinal ===
Stosur started her 2016 season at the Brisbane International, where she won her opening match against qualifier Jana Čepelová, but lost her second-round match to sixth seed Carla Suárez Navarro. She then reached the quarterfinals in Sydney, defeating Roberta Vinci and Daniela Hantuchová, before falling to eventual finalist Monica Puig. She then suffered an opening round loss at the Australian Open to Kristýna Plíšková in straight sets.

In February, she won both singles rubbers in the World Group II, against Čepelová and Anna Karolína Schmiedlová, both in straight sets.

In the North American hardcourt swing, Stosur reached the last 16 in Indian Wells, after three-set wins over Yanina Wickmayer and Christina McHale. She then lost to eventual champion Victoria Azarenka. She lost her opening match in Miami to Julia Görges in three sets.

She began her clay-court season in Charleston, falling in the quarterfinals to Sara Errani in straight sets. Despite losing both rubbers in the World Group play-offs in Brisbane to Christina McHale and CoCo Vandeweghe, Stosur was able to bounce back and reach the final in Prague, losing to Lucie Šafářová. She was then able to carry this form into Madrid, where she reached the semifinals, before losing to Simona Halep, winning only two games. She then won her opening match at the Italian Open against Alison Riske, before losing to Kuznetsova in the second round. She then participated in the Internationaux de Strasbourg, where she won her first two matches in straight sets, before withdrawing from her quarterfinal match against Caroline Garcia, due to a wrist injury. At the French Open, Stosur beat Misaki Doi and Zhang Shuai in her opening two matches. She then beat 2015 finalist Lucie Šafářová to reach the fourth round in Paris for a fifth time. In a rain-delayed match stretched over three days, Stosur then came back from 5–3 down in the opening set to beat world No. 6, Simona Halep, 7–6, 6–3 to reach her first Grand Slam quarterfinal since the US Open and avenge her lost in Madrid. In her quarterfinal match against Tsvetana Pironkova, Stosur came back from a break down in both sets, recording a narrow 6–4, 7–6 win. Next she played world No. 4, Garbiñe Muguruza, in the semifinals, but lost in straight sets. Despite losing, Stosur reached her first Grand Slam semifinals since 2012 French Open, and would rise back to the top 15.

Stosur competed at a start up tournament for Wimbledon to begin her grass-court season. She lost to Caroline Wozniacki in the second round. At Wimbledon, she beat Magda Linette in the first round. However, she was beaten by grass-court specialist Sabine Lisicki in the second round.

Stosur began her US Open Series campaign at the Washington Open as the top-seed. She made the quarterfinals with a win over Russian qualifier Alla Kudryavtseva, and after Caroline Wozniacki retired in the second set due to a back injury before losing to eventual semifinalist, American wildcard Jessica Pegula, in straight sets. She then competed at the Rogers Cup as the 13th seed, defeating Heather Watson in the first round before losing to Daria Kasatkina in the second.

At the Summer Olympics in Rio, Stosur made it to the third round as the 13th seed, with wins over Latvian teen Jeļena Ostapenko and Japan's Misaki Doi before bowing out to second seed and eventual silver medallist Angelique Kerber of Germany. Partnering with Daria Gavrilova in the women's doubles, the duo lost to fifth seeded Swiss pairing of Timea Bacsinszky and Martina Hingis the eventual silver medallist in opening round. In mixed doubles, Stosur paired up with John Peers and lost to the fourth seeds Sania Mirza and Rohan Bopanna in the first round.

Seeded 14th at the Western and Southern Open, Stosur received a first-round bye. In her opening match, she lost against Barbora Strýcová in two sets. Entering the US Open as the 16th seed, Stosur won her first-round match against Italian Camila Giorgi in a three-set thriller, before losing to Zhang Shuai in straight sets in the second round.

Stosur began her Asian hardcourt swing with a first-round loss as the 16th seed at the Wuhan Open to Caroline Wozniacki. This was backed up with first-round losses at the China Open and the Hong Kong Open, falling to Zhang Shuai and Nao Hibino both in straight sets. Competing at the WTA Elite Trophy in Zhuhai as the eighth seed, Stosur lost both of her round-robin matches to top-seed Johanna Konta and 11th seed Caroline Garcia both in straight sets. Stosur ended the year ranked No. 21 in singles.

=== 2017: Ninth WTA title ===
Stosur began the season at the Brisbane International with a first-round loss to fourth-seed Garbiñe Muguruza in a three-set thriller. She then competed at the Apia Sydney International where she lost to Anastasia Pavlyuchenkova, in straight sets. This was her eighth straight loss in the five months since her win over Camila Giorgi at the 2016 US Open. She then fell to Heather Watson in the first round of the Australian Open, in three sets. Stosur ended her five-month losing streak at the Taiwan Open where she was the second seed. She defeated Danka Kovinić in straight sets to set up a clash with Slovenian qualifier Dalila Jakupović and defeated her in three sets. Her run ended at the hands of Peng Shuai in the quarterfinals in straight sets. Stosur withdrew from Australia's Fed Cup tie against Ukraine due to lack of form. She then competed at the Qatar Open where she reached the quarterfinals. She defeated Latvian Anastasija Sevastova and eighth seed Barbora Strýcová before falling to Dominika Cibulková in straight sets for the first time. Seeded 12th at the Dubai Championships, she defeated qualifier Zhang Kailin in straight sets in the first round, before losing to Croatian teen Ana Konjuh in straight sets, in the second.

Her next tournament was the Indian Wells Open where she was the 16th seed. She lost her opening-round match against Julia Görges in a three-set thriller. After that disappointing run, Stosur bounced back at the Miami Open where she was seeded 14th. She reached the fourth round after defeating in-form fellow Australian Ashleigh Barty in the second round, avenging her quarterfinal loss at the Taiwan Open by defeating Peng Shuai in three sets before her run ended at the hands of Simona Halep in a three-set thriller. Her next tournament was the Charleston Open where she received a first-round bye. She beat Serbian former world No. 1, Jelena Janković, in straight sets before losing to Irina-Camelia Begu in straight sets.

In Stuttgart, Stosur lost in the first round to Anastasija Sevastova. In Prague, she played as the fourth seed, and after defeating Evgeniya Rodina, she lost in the second round to qualifier Beatriz Haddad Maia. In Madrid, Stosur lost in the third round to the fourth seed Simona Halep, having defeated Sara Sorribes Tormo and Mariana Duque Mariño. Then in Rome Stosur lost in the first round to Anastasia Pavlyuchenkova.

Stosur won her ninth WTA title in Strasbourg, defeating fellow Australian Daria Gavrilova in the final. The heavily disputed match between the two Australians lasted 2 hours and 45 minutes.

She then began her campaign at the French Open to try and defend her semifinalist points from last year. She defeated Kristína Kučová in the first round, in straight sets, to advance to the second round where she beat former world No. 13, Kirsten Flipkens, in straight sets to advance to the third round. She then defeated Bethanie Mattek-Sands in straight sets but lost in the fourth round to eventual champion Jeļena Ostapenko. This resulted in her losing her Australian women's No. 1 ranking to Daria Gavrilova. And, unfortunately, Stosur missed the grass-court season because of a stress fracture in her hand.

=== 2018: First doubles title in five years ===
At the Australian Open, Stosur lost in the first round to Monica Puig despite having match point in the second set. She also failed to defend her title at the Internationaux de Strasbourg, losing to Dominika Cibulková in the quarterfinals of the tournament.

At the French Open, Stosur lost in the third round to Garbiñe Muguruza.

In Mallorca, Stosur reached the semifinals where she lost to Sevastova. At Wimbledon, she lost in the second round to fellow Australian Daria Gavrilova. At the US Open, she was defeated in round one by second seed Caroline Wozniacki.

=== 2019: Australian Open doubles title ===
Stosur competed with Zhang Shuai at the Australian Open. In the second round, they defeated eighth seeds Hsieh Su-wei and Abigail Spears, and in the quarterfinals, they beat top seeds Barbora Krejčíková & Kateřina Siniaková. They advanced to the final, where they defeated second seeds and defending champions, Kristina Mladenovic and Tímea Babos, to win the championship. This was Stosur's first Grand Slam title since the 2014 Wimbledon mixed-doubles title and her first in women's doubles since the 2006 French Open.

=== 2021: Western & Southern Open and US Open doubles titles ===
Stosur started her 2021 season at the first edition of the Yarra Valley Classic. She lost in the first round to 16th seed Marie Bouzková. At the Australian Open, she won her first-round match over compatriot Destanee Aiava. She suffered a second round thrashing at the hands of Jessica Pegula. In mixed doubles, she and compatriot Matthew Ebden reached the final where they lost to Barbora Krejčíková/Rajeev Ram. Playing in Adelaide, she was defeated in the first round by qualifier and compatriot Maddison Inglis.

In August 2021, Stosur won the Cincinnati Open doubles with Zhang Shuai. It is Stosur's 27th career doubles title and first since the Australian Open 2019. She then won the 2021 US Open title with Zhang Shuai beating Coco Gauff/Caty McNally in the final.

=== 2022: Mixed doubles final at Wimbledon, retirement in singles ===
Stosur announced her forthcoming singles retirement after the 2022 Australian Open, to which she received a wildcard. She reached the second round, in which she lost to 11th–seeded Anastasia Pavlyuchenkova. This was announced as her retirement from professional tennis in singles. She then participated in the Indian Wells and the Miami Open, on both occasions partnered with Zhang Shuai. They lost in the first round in both tournaments. Stosur then received a wildcard for her final singles tournament, the 2022 Internationaux de Strasbourg, where she lost in the first round to Harmony Tan.

At Wimbledon, she reached the final in mixed doubles with Matthew Ebden but they lost to defending champions Desirae Krawczyk and Neal Skupski.

=== 2023: Retirement ===
Sam Stosur announced on her Instagram account that the 2023 Australian Open would be the last tournament of her career.

== Apparel and equipment ==
Since 2012, Stosur has been sponsored by Asics for clothing, apparel, and footwear. Until 2009, Stosur was unsponsored for clothing, and would typically wear Nike clothing and footwear; in that year she became sponsored by Lacoste for clothing, and continued to wear Nike footwear. Stosur has used numerous racquets throughout her career – until 2009, she used a Prince O3 racquet, before switching to the Babolat Pure Storm racquet. When this racquet was discontinued in 2016, she continued her sponsorship with Babolat, utilising the Pure Strike racquet. In 2018, Stosur switched racquets, becoming sponsored by Head, specifically using the Head Graphene 360+ Speed racquet.

== Personal life ==
On 13 July 2020, she announced her partner, Liz Astling, had given birth to a daughter, Genevieve.

== Rivalries ==
=== Stosur v Serena Williams ===
Currently, Williams leads 8–3 in head-to-head matches. Their first match occurred during the 2008 Beijing Olympics in the second round when Williams was ranked world No. 4, with Williams winning 6–2, 6–0. However, Stosur won their most important match, the 2011 US Open final, prevailing 6–2, 6–3 despite Williams going into the match as the clear favourite. That match had its share of controversy when Williams was docked a point for violating the hindrance rule. Williams avenged the defeat at the 2012 Miami Open, 7–5, 6–3. They next met a week later at the 2012 Family Circle Cup, where Williams again defeated Stosur 6–1, 6–1.

Both players have held match points against the other in matches that they have gone on to lose. Examples include Stosur having four match points at the 2009 Medibank International Sydney, but eventually losing. Another example was the 2010 French Open where Williams had a match point, but Stosur won.

The only time they did not play a complete match was at the 2011 Western & Southern Open in the second round where Williams withdrew due to a toe injury.

=== Stosur v Schiavone ===
Currently, Stosur leads 9–4 in head-to-head matches. Their important matches include the 2009 final of Japan Open in Osaka, where Stosur lifted her first WTA Tour singles title, and the 2010 French Open final. It was both players' first ever Grand Slam final, with Schiavone coming out on top.

=== Stosur v Zvonareva ===
Currently, Stosur leads 8–3 in their head-to-head matches. Zvonareva won their first two meetings. After that, Stosur has won the following eight matches, including the 2010 Family Circle Cup final and the 2011 US Open quarterfinal match.

=== Stosur v Sharapova ===
Maria Sharapova leads 15–2 in their head-to-head matches. Sharapova won their first nine meetings, prevailing in straight sets at their most recent meeting at the 2015 French Open. Sharapova retired in 2020.

=== Stosur v Li ===
Stosur leads 6–1 in head-to-head matches. Stosur won the first six meetings, five of them being in straight sets, including an overwhelming 6–1, 6–0 victory against Li Na at the WTA Championships in 2011. Li Na then retired in 2014.

=== Stosur v Šafářová ===
Šafářová leads their head-to-head 11–4. Their first meeting was in Charleston, when Šafářová won 5–7, 6–1, 6–4. After next two Šafářová's wins, Stosur won their fourth match in Miami and then again in Dubai. After that Šafářová won two times in two tie-breaks, in Montreal and in Ostrava during 2013 Fed Cup competition. Šafářová beat Stosur even three-times in 2013, in Eastbourne, Tokyo in the third round and following week in Beijing in the first round. In 2014, they met in Charleston third round, where Šafářová won again, but in 2015, Stosur won in Sydney in three sets, but Šafářová got revenge in Doha. They met again in 2016 in the final in Prague, which Šafářová won in three sets. Stosur then beat her at the 2016 French Open in three sets.

== Coaching ==
Stosur has had several coaches through the years. David Taylor coached her from 2008 to 2013 and 2015 to 2016, and Miles Maclagan was her coach in 2013 and 2014. Others include Simon Rea (2014–2015) and Joshua Eagle (2017–2018). In November 2018 Stosur began working with Nick Watkins. In 2019 she began working with Rennae Stubbs.

== Career statistics ==
=== Grand Slam performance timelines ===
Key
W	F	SF	QF	#R	RR	Q#	P#	DNQ	A	Z#	PO	G	S	B	NMS	NTI	P	NH

(W) winner; (F) finalist; (SF) semifinalist; (QF) quarterfinalist; (#R) rounds 4, 3, 2, 1; (RR) round-robin stage; (Q#) qualification round; (P#) preliminary round; (DNQ) did not qualify; (A) absent; (Z#) Davis/Fed Cup Zonal Group (with number indication) or (PO) play-off; (G) gold, (S) silver or (B) bronze Olympic/Paralympic medal; (NMS) not a Masters tournament; (NTI) not a Tier I tournament; (P) postponed; (NH) not held; (SR) strike rate (events won / competed); (W–L) win–loss record.
To avoid confusion and double counting, these charts are updated at the conclusion of a tournament or when the player's participation has ended.

==== Singles ====
Tournament	2002	2003	2004	2005	2006	2007	2008	2009	2010	2011	2012	2013	2014	2015	2016	2017	2018	2019	2020	2021	2022	SR	W–L	Win%
Australian Open	1R	3R	2R	1R	4R	2R	A	3R	4R	3R	1R	2R	3R	2R	1R	1R	1R	1R	1R	2R	2R	0 / 20	20–20	50%
French Open	A	A	1R	2R	1R	3R	2R	SF	F	3R	SF	3R	4R	3R	SF	4R	3R	2R	A	A	A	0 / 16	40–16	71%
Wimbledon	A	1R	1R	1R	2R	2R	2R	3R	1R	1R	2R	3R	1R	3R	2R	A	2R	1R	NH	1R	A	0 / 17	12–17	41%
US Open	A	A	2R	1R	1R	1R	1R	2R	QF	W	QF	1R	2R	4R	2R	A	1R	1R	A	1R	A	1 / 16	22–15	59%
Win–loss	0–1	2–2	2–4	1–4	4–4	4–4	2–3	10–4	13–4	11–3	10–4	5–4	6–4	8–4	7–4	3–2	3–4	1–4	0–1	1–3	1–1	1 / 69	94–68	58%

==== Doubles ====
Tournament	2002	2003	2004	2005	2006	2007	2008	2009	2010	2011	2012	2013	2014	2015	2016	2017	2018	2019	2020	2021	2022	2023	SR	W–L	Win%
Australian Open	1R	1R	2R	2R	F	SF	A	3R	1R	A	A	2R	2R	3R	2R	2R	A	W	1R	1R	2R	1R	1 / 18	26–17	60%
French Open	A	A	3R	3R	W	SF	3R	3R	3R	A	1R	3R	1R	3R	1R	1R	2R	QF	A	A	3R	A	1 / 16	30–15	67%
Wimbledon	A	2R	2R	SF	3R	SF	F	F	3R	F	2R	1R	3R	2R	A	A	1R	2R	NH	1R	1R	A	0 / 17	34–17	67%
US Open	A	2R	3R	W	SF	3R	F	SF	A	1R	A	2R	A	1R	2R	A	SF	1R	A	W	1R	A	2 / 15	36–13	73%
Win–loss	0–1	2–3	6–4	13–3	17–3	14–4	12–3	13–4	4–3	5–2	1–2	4–4	3–3	5–4	2–3	1–2	5–3	10–3	0–1	6–2	3–4	0–1	4 / 66	126–62	67%

==== Mixed doubles ====
Tournament	2005	2006	2007	2008	2009	2010	2011	2012	2013	2014	2015	2016	2017	2018	2019	2020	2021	2022	2023	SR	W–L	Win%
Australian Open	W	SF	QF	A	A	A	A	A	A	A	A	2R	SF	2R	2R	2R	F	2R	1R	1 / 11	26–10	72%
French Open	SF	A	A	A	A	A	A	A	A	A	A	A	A	A	A	NH	A	QF	A	0 / 2	5–2	71%
Wimbledon	QF	QF	3R	W	QF	3R	1R	A	A	W	A	1R	A	1R	1R	NH	2R	F	A	2 / 13	25–11	69%
US Open	QF	A	A	2R	A	A	A	A	A	A	A	A	A	A	SF	NH	1R	QF	A	0 / 5	7–5	58%
Win–loss	16–3	9–2	5–2	6–1	2–1	1–1	0–1	0–0	0–0	5–0	0–0	1–2	3–1	1–2	4–3	1–1	5–3	5–3	0–1	3 / 31	67–28	71%

=== Grand Slam tournament finals ===
==== Singles: 2 (1 title, 1 runner-up) ====
Result	Year	Championship	Surface	Opponent	Score
Loss	2010	French Open	Clay	(Italy) Francesca Schiavone	4–6, 6–7^{(2–7)}
Win	2011	US Open	Hard	(United States) Serena Williams	6–2, 6–3

==== Doubles: 9 (4 titles, 5 runner-ups) ====
Result	Year	Championship	Surface	Partner	Opponents	Score
Win	2005	US Open	Hard	(United States) Lisa Raymond	(Russia) Elena Dementieva (Italy) Flavia Pennetta	6–2, 5–7, 6–3
Loss	2006	Australian Open	Hard	(United States) Lisa Raymond	(China) Yan Zi (China) Zheng Jie	6–2, 6–7^{(7–9)}, 3–6
Win	2006	French Open	Clay	(United States) Lisa Raymond	(Slovakia) Daniela Hantuchová (Japan) Ai Sugiyama	6–3, 6–2
Loss	2008	Wimbledon	Grass	(United States) Lisa Raymond	(United States) Serena Williams (United States) Venus Williams	2–6, 2–6
Loss	2008	US Open	Hard	(United States) Lisa Raymond	(Zimbabwe) Cara Black (United States) Liezel Huber	3–6, 6–7^{(6–8)}
Loss	2009	Wimbledon	Grass	(Australia) Rennae Stubbs	(United States) Serena Williams (United States) Venus Williams	6–7^{(4–7)}, 4–6
Loss	2011	Wimbledon	Grass	(Germany) Sabine Lisicki	(Czech Republic) Květa Peschke (Slovenia) Katarina Srebotnik	3–6, 1–6
Win	2019	Australian Open	Hard	(China) Zhang Shuai	(Hungary) Tímea Babos (France) Kristina Mladenovic	6–3, 6–4
Win	2021	US Open	Hard	(China) Zhang Shuai	(United States) Coco Gauff (United States) Caty McNally	6–3, 3–6, 6–3

==== Mixed doubles: 5 (3 titles, 2 runner-ups) ====
Result	Year	Championship	Surface	Partner	Opponents	Score
Win	2005	Australian Open	Hard	(Australia) Scott Draper	(South Africa) Liezel Huber (Zimbabwe) Kevin Ullyett	6–2, 2–6, [10–6]
Win	2008	Wimbledon	Grass	(United States) Bob Bryan	(Slovenia) Katarina Srebotnik (United States) Mike Bryan	7–5, 6–4
Win	2014	Wimbledon (2)	Grass	(Serbia) Nenad Zimonjić	(Belarus) Max Mirnyi (Chinese Taipei) Chan Hao-ching	6–4, 6–2
Loss	2021	Australian Open	Hard	(Australia) Matthew Ebden	(Czech Republic) Barbora Krejčíková (United States) Rajeev Ram	1–6, 4–6
Loss	2022	Wimbledon	Grass	(Australia) Matthew Ebden	(United States) Desirae Krawczyk (United Kingdom) Neal Skupski	4–6, 3–6

== Sources ==
- Sports Illustrated column by doubles partner Lisa Raymond

Awards and achievements
Preceded by (Argentina) Paola Suárez & (Spain) Virginia Ruano Pascual	WTA Doubles Team of the Year (with (United States) Lisa Raymond); 2005, 2006	Succeeded by (Zimbabwe) Cara Black & (United States) Liezel Huber
Preceded by (Argentina) Paola Suárez & (Spain) Virginia Ruano Pascual	ITF Doubles Champions (with (United States) Lisa Raymond); 2005, 2006	Succeeded by (Zimbabwe) Cara Black & (United States) Liezel Huber
Preceded by (Russia) Elena Dementieva	WTA Diamond Aces; 2010	Succeeded by (Denmark) Caroline Wozniacki
