= 2019 Kangaroo Cup =

- Date: 29 April–5 May 2019
- Edition: 24th
- Category: ITF Women's World Tennis Tour
- Prize money: $80,000
- Surface: Hard
- Location: Gifu, Japan

Champions

Singles
- (Kazakhstan) Zarina Diyas

Doubles
- (China) Duan Yingying / (China) Han Xinyun
← 2018 ·	Kangaroo Cup	· 2023 →

The 2019 Kangaroo Cup was a professional tennis tournament played on outdoor hard courts. It was the twenty-fourth edition of the tournament which was part of the 2019 ITF Women's World Tennis Tour. It took place in Gifu, Japan between 29 April and 5 May 2019.

== Singles main-draw entrants ==
=== Seeds ===
Country	Player	Rank^{1}	Seed
CHN	Zhu Lin	94	1
THA	Luksika Kumkhum	96	2
KAZ	Zarina Diyas	107	3
JPN	Nao Hibino	112	4
GBR	Heather Watson	118	5
CHN	Liu Fangzhou	158	6
UZB	Sabina Sharipova	164	7
USA	Danielle Lao	165	8

- ^{1} Rankings are as of 22 April 2019.

=== Other entrants ===
The following players received wildcards into the singles main draw:

- (Japan) Mai Hontama
- (Japan) Chihiro Muramatsu
- (Japan) Yuki Naito
- (Japan) Yuki Ukai

The following players received entry from the qualifying draw:

- (United Kingdom) Naomi Broady
- (Australia) Maddison Inglis
- (Japan) Haruka Kaji
- (Japan) Kyōka Okamura
- (Japan) Akiko Omae
- (China) Yuan Yue

== Champions ==
=== Singles ===
- (Kazakhstan) Zarina Diyas def. (Chinese Taipei) Liang En-shuo, 6–0, 6–2

=== Doubles ===
- (China) Duan Yingying / (China) Han Xinyun def. (Japan) Akiko Omae / (Thailand) Peangtarn Plipuech, 6–3, 4–6, [10–4]
