= 2017 Kangaroo Cup =

- Date: 1–7 May
- Edition: 22nd
- Category: ITF Women's Circuit
- Prize money: $80,000
- Surface: Hard
- Location: Gifu, Japan

Champions

Singles
- (Slovakia) Magdaléna Rybáriková

Doubles
- (Japan) Eri Hozumi / (Japan) Miyu Kato
| ← 2016 · | Kangaroo Cup | · 2018 → |

The 2017 Kangaroo Cup was a professional tennis tournament played on outdoor hard courts. It was the twenty-second edition of the tournament and part of the 2017 ITF Women's Circuit, offering a total of $80,000 in prize money. It took place in Gifu, Japan, from 1–7 May 2017.

== Singles main draw entrants ==
=== Seeds ===
| Country | Player | Rank^{1} | Seed |
|---|---|---|---|
| JPN | Kurumi Nara | 95 | 1 |
| CHN | Liu Fangzhou | 127 | 2 |
| CHN | Zhu Lin | 136 | 3 |
| KOR | Jang Su-jeong | 142 | 4 |
| JPN | Hiroko Kuwata | 176 | 5 |
| RUS | Ksenia Lykina | 182 | 6 |
| KOR | Han Na-lae | 183 | 7 |
| KAZ | Zarina Diyas | 187 | 8 |

- ^{1} Rankings as of 24 April 2017

=== Other entrants ===
The following players received wildcards into the singles main draw:

- (Japan) Kimiko Date
- (Japan) Yuika Sano
- (Japan) Ayano Shimizu
- (Japan) Miki Ukai

The following players received entry into the singles main draw by a protected ranking:

- (Slovakia) Magdaléna Rybáriková

The following players received entry from the qualifying draw:

- (China) Kang Jiaqi
- (Japan) Momoko Kobori
- (Japan) Erika Sema
- (Thailand) Varatchaya Wongteanchai

== Champions ==
=== Singles ===
- (Slovakia) Magdaléna Rybáriková def. (China) Zhu Lin, 6–2, 6–3

=== Doubles ===
- (Japan) Eri Hozumi / (Japan) Miyu Kato def. (United Kingdom) Katy Dunne / (Israel) Julia Glushko, 6–4, 6–2
