= 2015 Kangaroo Cup – Singles =

Singles
- 2015 Kangaroo Cup

Final
- Champion: (China) Zheng Saisai
- Runner-up: (Japan) Naomi Osaka
- Score: 3–6, 7–5, 6–4

Events
Singles	Doubles
← 2014 ·	Kangaroo Cup	· 2016 →

Tímea Babos was the defending champion, but she chose to participate at the 2015 Grand Prix SAR La Princesse Lalla Meryem instead.

Zheng Saisai won the title, defeating Naomi Osaka in the final, 3–6, 7–5, 6–4.

== Seeds ==
1. (China) Zheng Saisai (champion)
2. (China) Wang Qiang (first round)
3. (Belgium) An-Sophie Mestach (first round)
4. (China) Duan Yingying (quarterfinals)
5. (Czech Republic) Kristýna Plíšková (quarterfinals)
6. (Japan) Misa Eguchi (first round)
7. (Thailand) Luksika Kumkhum (first round)
8. (Japan) Kimiko Date-Krumm (first round)

== Main draw ==
=== Key ===
- Q = Qualifier
- WC = Wild card
- LL = Lucky loser
- Alt = Alternate
- SE = Special exempt
- PR = Protected ranking
- ITF = ITF entry
- JE = Junior exempt
- w/o = Walkover
- r = Retired
- d = Defaulted
- SR = Special ranking

=== Finals ===
Semifinals
1	(China) Zheng Saisai	7	6
Q	(Japan) Mayo Hibi	5	1
(China) Xu Yifan	6	2	2
(Japan) Naomi Osaka	4	6	6

Final
1	(China) Zheng Saisai	3	7	6
(Japan) Naomi Osaka	6	5	4

=== Top half ===
First round
1	(China) S Zheng	6	6
(Japan) H Kuwata	3	1
(Japan) S Aoyama	5	4
(United Kingdom) N Broady	7	6
(Japan) R Sawayanagi	6	0	2
Q	(Japan) E Sema	4	6	6
(Thailand) T Tanasugarn	4	3
5	(Czech Republic) Kr Plíšková	6	6
4	(China) Y Duan	6	6
(Sweden) S Celik	1	1
WC	(Japan) A Morita	6	7^{7}
Q	(Japan) M Ayukawa	1	6^{3}
(Japan) N Hibino	4	4
(Japan) E Hozumi	6	6
Q	(Japan) M Hibi	6	6
8	(Japan) K Date-Krumm	4	2

Second round
1	(China) S Zheng	7	6
(United Kingdom) N Broady	5	2
Q	(Japan) E Sema	5	6	2
5	(Czech Republic) Kr Plíšková	7	4	6
4	(China) Y Duan	1	6	6
WC	(Japan) A Morita	6	3	1
(Japan) E Hozumi	4	1
Q	(Japan) M Hibi	6	6

Quarterfinals
1	(China) S Zheng	6	3	6
5	(Czech Republic) Kr Plíšková	1	6	2
4	(China) Y Duan	6	3	2
Q	(Japan) M Hibi	4	6	6

Semifinals
1	(China) S Zheng	7	6
Q	(Japan) M Hibi	5	1

=== Bottom half ===
First round
7	(Thailand) L Kumkhum	7^{7}	1	4
(China) Y Xu	6^{4}	6	6
WC	(Japan) M Ukai	1	0
(Russia) E Bychkova	6	6
WC	(Japan) M Kato	4	4
Q	(Serbia) I Jorović	6	6
(Thailand) V Wongteanchai	7	6
3	(Belgium) A-S Mestach	5	2
6	(Japan) M Eguchi	3	2
(Japan) M Imanishi	6	6
(Hong Kong) L Zhang	6	6
(Japan) J Namigata	3	3
WC	(Japan) Y Adachi	2	0
(China) Y Wang	6	6
(Japan) N Osaka	7	4	6
2	(China) Q Wang	5	6	2

Second round
(China) Y Xu	7	4	6
(Russia) E Bychkova	5	6	3
Q	(Serbia) I Jorović	6	6
(Thailand) V Wongteanchai	2	2
(Japan) M Imanishi	6	3	6
(Hong Kong) L Zhang	0	6	1
(China) Y Wang	6^{4}	6	4
(Japan) N Osaka	7^{7}	4	6

Quarterfinals
(China) Y Xu	6	6
Q	(Serbia) I Jorović	2	3
(Japan) M Imanishi	4	2
(Japan) N Osaka	6	6

Semifinals
(China) Y Xu	6	2	2
(Japan) N Osaka	4	6	6
