= 2016 Kangaroo Cup – Singles =

Singles
- 2016 Kangaroo Cup

Final
- Champion: (Japan) Hiroko Kuwata
- Runner-up: (China) Wang Qiang
- Score: 6–2, 2–6, 6–4

Events
Singles	Doubles
← 2015 ·	Kangaroo Cup	· 2017 →

Zheng Saisai was the defending champion, but chose to participate in Madrid instead.

Hiroko Kuwata won the title, defeating Wang Qiang in the final, 6–2, 2–6, 6–4.

== Seeds ==
1. (China) Wang Qiang (final)
2. (China) Duan Yingying (first round; retired)
3. (Thailand) Luksika Kumkhum (second round)
4. (Japan) Miyu Kato (first round)
5. (Belgium) An-Sophie Mestach (first round)
6. (Japan) Mayo Hibi (quarterfinals)
7. (South Korea) Jang Su-jeong (second round)
8. (China) Zhu Lin (semifinals)

== Main draw ==
=== Key ===
- Q = Qualifier
- WC = Wild card
- LL = Lucky loser
- Alt = Alternate
- SE = Special exempt
- PR = Protected ranking
- ITF = ITF entry
- JE = Junior exempt
- w/o = Walkover
- r = Retired
- d = Defaulted
- SR = Special ranking

=== Finals ===
Semifinals
1	(China) Wang Qiang	6	1	6
(Japan) Shuko Aoyama	2	6	2
(Japan) Hiroko Kuwata	6^{2}	6	7
8	(China) Zhu Lin	7^{7}	4	5

Final
1	(China) Wang Qiang	2	6	4
(Japan) Hiroko Kuwata	6	2	6

=== Top half ===
First round
1	(China) Q Wang	6	6
(Japan) M Ninomiya	3	2
WC	(Japan) M Date	2	3
Q	(Japan) A Omae	6	6
WC	(Japan) A Yoshitomi	2	2
(Japan) E Sema	6	6
(Japan) K Okamura	6	4	3
6	(Japan) M Hibi	2	6	6
4	(Japan) M Kato	4	0
Q	(Netherlands) I de Vroome	6	6
(Japan) S Aoyama	6	3	6
(Russia) K Lykina	1	6	3
(Japan) M Inoue	6^{1}	6^{4}
JE	(Hungary) D Gálfi	7^{7}	7^{7}
(Japan) E Hozumi	6	6
5	(Belgium) A-S Mestach	3	3

Second round
1	(China) Q Wang	6	6
Q	(Japan) A Omae	1	3
(Japan) E Sema	4	3
6	(Japan) M Hibi	6	6
Q	(Netherlands) I de Vroome	6	1	2
(Japan) S Aoyama	4	6	6
JE	(Hungary) D Gálfi	4	2
(Japan) E Hozumi	6	6

Quarterfinals
1	(China) Q Wang	6	6
6	(Japan) M Hibi	2	3
(Japan) S Aoyama	7^{7}	1	7^{8}
(Japan) E Hozumi	6^{5}	6	6^{6}

Semifinals
1	(China) Q Wang	6	1	6
(Japan) S Aoyama	2	6	2

=== Bottom half ===
First round
7	(South Korea) S-j Jang	6^{6}	6	6
Q	(Japan) C Nunome	7^{8}	2	3
WC	(Japan) M Ukai	3	6	1
(Japan) H Kuwata	6	4	6
(Japan) A Okuno	2	1
(Japan) R Sawayanagi	6	6
(Australia) S Sanders	4	4
3	(Thailand) L Kumkhum	6	6
8	(China) L Zhu	6	6
Q	(United States) T Kinard	3	1
(South Korea) N-l Han	2	6	6
(United Kingdom) K Dunne	6	3	1
(China) F Liu	6	6
PR	(Japan) M Imanishi	4	3
WC	(Japan) C Muramatsu	3	6	1
2	(China) Y Duan	6	1	0^{r}

Second round
7	(South Korea) S-j Jang	0	2
(Japan) H Kuwata	6	6
(Japan) R Sawayanagi	7^{8}	4	7^{7}
3	(Thailand) L Kumkhum	6^{6}	6	6^{5}
8	(China) L Zhu	7^{7}	4	6
(South Korea) N-l Han	6^{5}	6	3
(China) F Liu	6	6
WC	(Japan) C Muramatsu	2	1

Quarterfinals
(Japan) H Kuwata	6	6
(Japan) R Sawayanagi	0	3
8	(China) L Zhu	6	4	6
(China) F Liu	3	6	2

Semifinals
(Japan) H Kuwata	6^{2}	6	7
8	(China) L Zhu	7^{7}	4	5
