= 2015 Kangaroo Cup – Doubles =

Doubles
- 2015 Kangaroo Cup

Final
- Champions: (China) Wang Yafan (China) Xu Yifan
- Runners-up: (Belgium) An-Sophie Mestach (United Kingdom) Emily Webley-Smith
- Score: 6–2, 6–3

Events
Singles	Doubles
← 2014 ·	Kangaroo Cup	· 2016 →

Jarmila Gajdošová and Arina Rodionova were the defending champions, but chose not to participate.

Wang Yafan and Xu Yifan won the title, defeating An-Sophie Mestach and Emily Webley-Smith in the final, 6–2, 6–3.

== Seeds ==
1. (Japan) Shuko Aoyama / (Japan) Hiroko Kuwata (semifinals)
2. (China) Wang Yafan / (China) Xu Yifan (champions)
3. (United Kingdom) Naomi Broady / (Czech Republic) Kristýna Plíšková (quarterfinals)
4. (Japan) Junri Namigata / (Thailand) Tamarine Tanasugarn (quarterfinals; withdrew)

== Draw ==
=== Key ===
- Q = Qualifier
- WC = Wild card
- LL = Lucky loser
- Alt = Alternate
- SE = Special exempt
- PR = Protected ranking
- ITF = ITF entry
- JE = Junior exempt
- w/o = Walkover
- r = Retired
- d = Defaulted
- SR = Special ranking

First round
1	(Japan) S Aoyama (Japan) H Kuwata	6	7^{7}
WC	(Japan) N Hibino (Japan) M Kato	4	6^{2}
WC	(Japan) M Eguchi (Japan) R Sawayanagi	6	6
WC	(Japan) Y Adachi (Japan) M Ukai	2	3
3	(United Kingdom) N Broady (Czech Republic) Kr Plíšková	6	6
(Japan) C Okadaue (Japan) Y Tanaka	2	3
(Japan) E Hozumi (Japan) A Yonemura	6	3	[4]
(Belgium) A-S Mestach (United Kingdom) E Webley-Smith	2	6	[10]
(Japan) M Miyamura (Thailand) Vara Wongteanchai	2	2
Q	(Japan) M Inoue (Japan) A Omae	6	6
Q	(Australia) A Bai (Australia) A Myers	1	3
4	(Japan) J Namigata (Thailand) T Tanasugarn	6	6
(Japan) M Ninomiya (Hong Kong) L Zhang	6	6
(Japan) R Fujiwara (China) S Zheng	4	3
(Thailand) P Plipuech (Thailand) Varu Wongteanchai	6	2	[7]
2	(China) Y Wang (China) Y Xu	2	6	[10]

Quarterfinals
1	(Japan) S Aoyama (Japan) H Kuwata	6	6
WC	(Japan) M Eguchi (Japan) R Sawayanagi	2	2
3	(United Kingdom) N Broady (Czech Republic) Kr Plíšková	3	5
(Belgium) A-S Mestach (United Kingdom) E Webley-Smith	6	7
Q	(Japan) M Inoue (Japan) A Omae	w/o
4	(Japan) J Namigata (Thailand) T Tanasugarn
(Japan) M Ninomiya (Hong Kong) L Zhang	1	3
2	(China) Y Wang (China) Y Xu	6	6

Semifinals
1	(Japan) S Aoyama (Japan) H Kuwata	3	2
(Belgium) A-S Mestach (United Kingdom) E Webley-Smith	6	6
Q	(Japan) M Inoue (Japan) A Omae	4	1
2	(China) Y Wang (China) Y Xu	6	6

Final
(Belgium) A-S Mestach (United Kingdom) E Webley-Smith	2	3
2	(China) Y Wang (China) Y Xu	6	6
