= 2017 Kangaroo Cup – Singles =

Singles
- 2017 Kangaroo Cup

Final
- Champion: (Slovakia) Magdaléna Rybáriková
- Runner-up: (China) Zhu Lin
- Score: 6–2, 6–3

Events
Singles	Doubles
← 2016 ·	Kangaroo Cup	· 2018 →

Hiroko Kuwata was the defending champion, but lost in the first round to Shiho Akita.

Magdaléna Rybáriková won the title, defeating Zhu Lin in the final, 6–2, 6–3.

== Seeds ==
1. (Japan) Kurumi Nara (semifinals)
2. (China) Liu Fangzhou (second round, withdrew)
3. (China) Zhu Lin (final)
4. (South Korea) Jang Su-jeong (second round)
5. (Japan) Hiroko Kuwata (first round)
6. (Russia) Ksenia Lykina (first round)
7. (South Korea) Han Na-lae (second round)
8. (Kazakhstan) Zarina Diyas (first round)

== Draw ==
=== Key ===
- Q = Qualifier
- WC = Wild card
- LL = Lucky loser
- Alt = Alternate
- SE = Special exempt
- PR = Protected ranking
- ITF = ITF entry
- JE = Junior exempt
- w/o = Walkover
- r = Retired
- d = Defaulted
- SR = Special ranking

=== Finals ===
Semifinals
1	(Japan) Kurumi Nara	2	1
3	(China) Zhu Lin	6	6
(Thailand) Luksika Kumkhum	2	2
PR	(Slovakia) Magdaléna Rybáriková	6	6

Final
3	(China) Zhu Lin	2	3
PR	(Slovakia) Magdaléna Rybáriková	6	6

=== Top half ===
First round
1	(Japan) K Nara	6	6
Q	(Thailand) V Wongteanchai	1	2
Q	(Japan) E Sema	6	5	6^{3}
(Japan) K Okamura	2	7	7^{7}
(United States) J Cako	6	7^{7}
WC	(Japan) M Ukai	1	6^{5}
(Japan) S Akita	6	6
5	(Japan) H Kuwata	0	4
3	(China) L Zhu	6	6
WC	(Japan) K Date	2	2
(Thailand) P Plipuech	3	2
WC	(Japan) A Shimizu	6	6
Q	(Japan) M Kobori	1	3
Q	(China) J Kang	6	6
(United Kingdom) L Robson	6	6
6	(Russia) K Lykina	3	2

Second round
1	(Japan) K Nara	6	4	6
(Japan) K Okamura	3	6	0
(United States) J Cako	7	5	5
(Japan) S Akita	5	7	7
3	(China) L Zhu	6	6
WC	(Japan) A Shimizu	2	3
Q	(China) J Kang	7^{8}	0	2
(United Kingdom) L Robson	6^{6}	6	6

Quarterfinals
1	(Japan) K Nara	6	6
(Japan) S Akita	1	3
3	(China) L Zhu	6	6
(United Kingdom) L Robson	3	4

Semifinals
1	(Japan) K Nara	2	1
3	(China) L Zhu	6	6

=== Bottom half ===
First round
8	(Kazakhstan) Z Diyas	5	3
(Thailand) L Kumkhum	7	6
(China) J Lu	4	3
(Japan) M Kato	6	6
(Japan) R Sawayanagi	6	3	5
(Australia) Ar Rodionova	2	6	7
(Japan) A Omae	3	2
4	(South Korea) S-j Jang	6	6
7	(South Korea) N-l Han	6	6
(Japan) S Aoyama	4	2
(Israel) J Glushko	6	6
(Japan) J Namigata	1	1
PR	(Slovakia) M Rybáriková	6	6
(Japan) E Hozumi	4	1
WC	(Japan) Y Sano	0	0
2	(China) F Liu	6	6

Second round
(Thailand) L Kumkhum	6	6
(Japan) M Kato	3	0
(Australia) Ar Rodionova	6^{5}	6	6
4	(South Korea) S-j Jang	7^{7}	0	4
7	(South Korea) N-l Han	6	2	4
(Israel) J Glushko	3	6	6
PR	(Slovakia) M Rybáriková	w/o
2	(China) F Liu

Quarterfinals
(Thailand) L Kumkhum	5	6	6
(Australia) Ar Rodionova	7	4	2
(Israel) J Glushko	4	6	2
PR	(Slovakia) M Rybáriková	6	4	6

Semifinals
(Thailand) L Kumkhum	2	2
PR	(Slovakia) M Rybáriková	6	6
