= 2013 Kangaroo Cup =

- Date: 29 April – 5 May
- Edition: 17th
- Location: Gifu, Japan

Champions

Singles
- (Belgium) An-Sophie Mestach

Doubles
- (Thailand) Luksika Kumkhum / (Japan) Erika Sema
| ← 2012 · | Kangaroo Cup | · 2014 → |

The 2013 Kangaroo Cup was a professional tennis tournament played on outdoor hard courts. It was the seventeenth edition of the tournament which was part of the 2013 ITF Women's Circuit, offering a total of $50,000 in prize money. It took place in Gifu, Japan, on 29 April – 5 May 2013.

== WTA entrants ==
=== Seeds ===
| Country | Player | Rank^{1} | Seed |
|---|---|---|---|
| JPN | Kimiko Date-Krumm | 74 | 1 |
| CHN | Duan Yingying | 117 | 2 |
| AUS | Casey Dellacqua | 134 | 3 |
| THA | Luksika Kumkhum | 135 | 4 |
| CHN | Zheng Saisai | 161 | 5 |
| JPN | Erika Sema | 173 | 6 |
| AUS | Monique Adamczak | 179 | 7 |
| CHN | Wang Qiang | 189 | 8 |

- ^{1} Rankings as of 22 April 2013

=== Other entrants ===
The following players received wildcards into the singles main draw:

- (Japan) Yurika Aoki
- (Japan) Hiroko Kuwata
- (Japan) Yuika Sano
- (Japan) Miki Ukai

The following players received entry from the qualifying draw:

- (Ukraine) Tetyana Arefyeva
- (China) Hu Yueyue
- (Belgium) An-Sophie Mestach
- (Japan) Chiaki Okadaue

== Champions ==
=== Singles ===
- (Belgium) An-Sophie Mestach def. (China) Wang Qiang 1–6, 6–3, 6–0

=== Doubles ===
- (Thailand) Luksika Kumkhum / (Japan) Erika Sema def. (Japan) Nao Hibino / (Japan) Riko Sawayanagi 6–4, 6–3
