= 2012 Kangaroo Cup – Doubles =

Doubles
- 2012 Kangaroo Cup

Final
- Champions: (United States) Jessica Pegula (China) Zheng Saisai
- Runners-up: (Chinese Taipei) Chan Chin-wei (Chinese Taipei) Hsu Wen-hsin
- Score: 6–4, 3–6, [10–4]

Events
Singles	Doubles
← 2011 ·	Kangaroo Cup	· 2013 →

Chan Hao-ching and Chan Yung-jan were the defending champions, but Chan Hao-ching chose to compete in Budapest. Chan Yung-jan paired up with Casey Dellacqua, but lost in the quarterfinals to Chan Chin-wei and Hsu Wen-hsin.

Jessica Pegula and Zheng Saisai later defeated Chan and Hsu in the final, 6–4, 3–6, [10–4].

== Seeds ==
1. (Chinese Taipei) Chan Yung-jan / (Australia) Casey Dellacqua (quarterfinals)
2. (Thailand) Noppawan Lertcheewakarn / (Thailand) Tamarine Tanasugarn (first round)
3. (United States) Jessica Pegula / (China) Zheng Saisai (champions)
4. (China) Han Xinyun / (China) Sun Shengnan (first round)

== Draw ==
=== Key ===
- Q = Qualifier
- WC = Wild card
- LL = Lucky loser
- Alt = Alternate
- SE = Special exempt
- PR = Protected ranking
- ITF = ITF entry
- JE = Junior exempt
- w/o = Walkover
- r = Retired
- d = Defaulted
- SR = Special ranking

First round
1	(Chinese Taipei) Y-j Chan (Australia) C Dellacqua	7	6
Q	(United Kingdom) S Murray (United Kingdom) E Webley-Smith	5	2
(Ukraine) T Arefyeva (Poland) J Jegiołka	5	3
(Chinese Taipei) C-w Chan (Chinese Taipei) W-h Hsu	7	6
4	(China) X Han (China) S Sun	7^{7}	3	[4]
(Australia) M Adamczak (Australia) S Bengson	6^{3}	6	[10]
Q	(Austria) N Hofmanova (Japan) M Miyamura	3	4
(Japan) E Sema (Japan) Y Sema	6	6
WC	(Japan) Y Aoki (Japan) A Tajima	0	4
(United Kingdom) M South (Japan) R Tezuka	6	6
WC	(Japan) M Kato (Japan) M Ninomiya	3	6	[10]
3	(United States) J Pegula (China) S Zheng	6	1	[12]
(China) W Liu (China) Y Xu	6	6
WC	(Japan) H Kuwata (Japan) M Ukai	1	0
(Japan) S Aoyama (Japan) J Namigata	6	6
2	(Thailand) N Lertcheewakarn (Thailand) T Tanasugarn	3	2

Quarterfinals
1	(Chinese Taipei) Y-j Chan (Australia) C Dellacqua	4	1
(Chinese Taipei) C-w Chan (Chinese Taipei) W-h Hsu	6	6
(Australia) M Adamczak (Australia) S Bengson	4	6^{8}
(Japan) E Sema (Japan) Y Sema	6	7^{10}
(United Kingdom) M South (Japan) R Tezuka	6	3	[8]
3	(United States) J Pegula (China) S Zheng	4	6	[10]
(China) W Liu (China) Y Xu	3	6	[10]
(Japan) S Aoyama (Japan) J Namigata	6	4	[4]

Semifinals
(Chinese Taipei) C-w Chan (Chinese Taipei) W-h Hsu	6	2	[10]
(Japan) E Sema (Japan) Y Sema	3	6	[4]
3	(United States) J Pegula (China) S Zheng	7	6
(China) W Liu (China) Y Xu	5	2

Finals
(Chinese Taipei) C-w Chan (Chinese Taipei) W-h Hsu	4	6	[4]
3	(United States) J Pegula (China) S Zheng	6	3	[10]
