= 2015 Kangaroo Cup =

- Date: 27 April–3 May
- Edition: 19th
- Category: ITF Women's Circuit
- Prize money: $75,000
- Surface: Hard
- Location: Gifu, Japan

Champions

Singles
- (China) Zheng Saisai

Doubles
- (China) Wang Yafan / (China) Xu Yifan
← 2014 ·	Kangaroo Cup	· 2016 →

The 2015 Kangaroo Cup was a professional tennis tournament played on outdoor hard courts. It was the nineteenth edition of the tournament and part of the 2015 ITF Women's Circuit, offering a total of $75,000 in prize money. It took place in Gifu, Japan, on 27 April–3 May 2015.

== Singles main draw entrants ==
=== Seeds ===
Country	Player	Rank^{1}	Seed
CHN	Zheng Saisai	75	1
CHN	Wang Qiang	99	2
BEL	An-Sophie Mestach	111	3
CHN	Duan Yingying	122	4
CZE	Kristýna Plíšková	129	5
JPN	Misa Eguchi	132	6
THA	Luksika Kumkhum	141	7
JPN	Kimiko Date-Krumm	149	8

- ^{1} Rankings as of 20 April 2015

=== Other entrants ===
The following players received wildcards into the singles main draw:

- (Japan) Yuko Adachi
- (Japan) Miyu Kato
- (Japan) Ayumi Morita
- (Japan) Miki Ukai

The following players received entry from the qualifying draw:

- (Japan) Mana Ayukawa
- (Japan) Mayo Hibi
- (Serbia) Ivana Jorović
- (Japan) Erika Sema

== Champions ==
=== Singles ===
- (China) Zheng Saisai def. (Japan) Naomi Osaka, 3–6, 7–5, 6–4

=== Doubles ===
- (China) Wang Yafan / (China) Xu Yifan def. (Belgium) An-Sophie Mestach / (United Kingdom) Emily Webley-Smith, 6–2, 6–3
