= 2012 Kangaroo Cup =

- Date: 30 April – 6 May
- Edition: 16th
- Surface: Hard
- Location: Gifu, Japan

Champions

Singles
- (Japan) Kimiko Date-Krumm

Doubles
- (United States) Jessica Pegula / (China) Zheng Saisai
← 2011 ·	Kangaroo Cup	· 2013 →

The 2012 Kangaroo Cup was a professional tennis tournament played on hard courts. It was the sixteenth edition of the tournament which was part of the 2012 ITF Women's Circuit. It took place in Gifu, Japan between 30 April and 6 May 2012.

== WTA entrants ==
=== Seeds ===
Country	Player	Rank^{1}	Seed
JPN	Kimiko Date-Krumm	82	1
THA	Tamarine Tanasugarn	85	2
AUS	Casey Dellacqua	105	3
JPN	Erika Sema	131	4
TPE	Chan Yung-jan	137	5
JPN	Kurumi Nara	140	6
JPN	Yurika Sema	176	7
THA	Noppawan Lertcheewakarn	193	8

- ^{1} Rankings are as of April 23, 2012.

=== Other entrants ===
The following players received wildcards into the singles main draw:

- (Japan) Yurika Aoki
- (Japan) Makoto Ninomiya
- (Japan) Risa Ozaki
- (Japan) Miki Ukai

The following players received entry from the qualifying draw:

- (Japan) Shuko Aoyama
- (Chinese Taipei) Chan Chin-wei
- (China) Sun Shengnan
- (China) Zhou Yimiao

== Champions ==
=== Singles ===
- (Japan) Kimiko Date-Krumm def. (Thailand) Noppawan Lertcheewakarn, 6–1, 5–7, 6–3

=== Doubles ===
- (United States) Jessica Pegula / (China) Zheng Saisai def. (Chinese Taipei) Chan Chin-wei / (Chinese Taipei) Hsu Wen-hsin, 6–4, 3–6, [10–4]
