= 2016 Kangaroo Cup =

- Date: 2–8 May
- Edition: 21st
- Category: ITF Women's Circuit
- Prize money: $75,000+H
- Surface: Hard
- Location: Gifu, Japan

Champions

Singles
- (Japan) Hiroko Kuwata

Doubles
- (Japan) Eri Hozumi / (Japan) Miyu Kato
← 2015 ·	Kangaroo Cup	· 2017 →

The 2016 Kangaroo Cup was a professional tennis tournament played on outdoor hard courts. It was the twenty-first edition of the tournament and part of the 2016 ITF Women's Circuit, offering a total of $75,000+H in prize money. It took place in Gifu, Japan, on 2–8 May 2016.

== Singles main draw entrants ==
=== Seeds ===
Country	Player	Rank^{1}	Seed
CHN	Wang Qiang	79	1
CHN	Duan Yingying	126	2
THA	Luksika Kumkhum	140	3
JPN	Miyu Kato	145	4
BEL	An-Sophie Mestach	167	5
JPN	Mayo Hibi	168	6
KOR	Jang Su-jeong	172	7
CHN	Zhu Lin	177	8

- ^{1} Rankings as of 25 April 2016.

=== Other entrants ===
The following players received wildcards into the singles main draw:

- (Japan) Mahiro Date
- (Japan) Chihiro Muramatsu
- (Japan) Miki Ukai
- (Japan) Aiko Yoshitomi

The following players received entry from the qualifying draw:

- (United States) Tori Kinard
- (Japan) Chihiro Nunome
- (Japan) Akiko Omae
- (Netherlands) Indy de Vroome

The following player received entry by a protected ranking:

- (Japan) Miharu Imanishi

The following player received entry by a junior exempt:

- (Hungary) Dalma Gálfi

== Champions ==
=== Singles ===
- (Japan) Hiroko Kuwata def. (China) Wang Qiang, 6–2, 2–6, 6–4

=== Doubles ===
- (Japan) Eri Hozumi / (Japan) Miyu Kato def. (Japan) Hiroko Kuwata / (Japan) Ayaka Okuno, 6–1, 6–2
