= 2014 Kangaroo Cup – Singles =

Singles
- 2014 Kangaroo Cup

Final
- Champion: (Hungary) Tímea Babos
- Runner-up: (Russia) Ekaterina Bychkova
- Score: 6–1, 6–2

Events
Singles	Doubles
← 2013 ·	Kangaroo Cup	· 2015 →

An-Sophie Mestach was the defending champion, but lost in the semifinals to Tímea Babos.

Babos went on to win the tournament, defeating Ekaterina Bychkova in the final, 6–1, 6–2.

== Seeds ==
1. (Japan) Misaki Doi (quarterfinals)
2. (Hungary) Tímea Babos (champion)
3. (Belgium) An-Sophie Mestach (semifinals)
4. (Czech Republic) Kristýna Plíšková (second round)
5. (Japan) Eri Hozumi (first round)
6. (China) Duan Yingying (second round)
7. (Japan) Risa Ozaki (quarterfinals)
8. (Japan) Erika Sema (second round)

== Main draw ==
=== Key ===
- Q = Qualifier
- WC = Wild card
- LL = Lucky loser
- Alt = Alternate
- SE = Special exempt
- PR = Protected ranking
- ITF = ITF entry
- JE = Junior exempt
- w/o = Walkover
- r = Retired
- d = Defaulted
- SR = Special ranking

=== Finals ===
Semifinals
PR	(Australia) Jarmila Gajdošová	5	3
(Russia) Ekaterina Bychkova	7	6
3	(Belgium) An-Sophie Mestach	2	5
2	(Hungary) Tímea Babos	6	7

Final
(Russia) Ekaterina Bychkova	1	2
2	(Hungary) Tímea Babos	6	6

=== Top half ===
First round
1	(Japan) M Doi	6	6
Q	(Japan) J Namigata	1	1
(United Kingdom) S Murray	2	6^{3}
(China) Q Wang	6	7^{7}
(Ukraine) O Savchuk	6^{2}	2
PR	(Australia) J Gajdošová	7^{7}	6
Q	(Japan) Y Miyazaki	1	3
6	(China) Y Duan	6	6
4	(Czech Republic) Kr Plíšková	7^{7}	6^{5}	7
(France) I Pavlovic	6^{2}	7^{7}	5
LL	(Australia) T Patterson	6	6
(United Kingdom) T Moore	4	4
WC	(Japan) Y Aoki	1	0
(Russia) E Bychkova	6	6
(Australia) Ar Rodionova	2	2
8	(Japan) E Sema	6	6

Second round
1	(Japan) M Doi	3	6	6
(China) Q Wang	6	4	2
PR	(Australia) J Gajdošová	6	6
6	(China) Y Duan	4	2
4	(Czech Republic) Kr Plíšková	5	6	5
LL	(Australia) T Patterson	7	4	7
(Russia) E Bychkova	6^{3}	6	6
8	(Japan) E Sema	7^{7}	4	2

Quarterfinals
1	(Japan) M Doi	3	3
PR	(Australia) J Gajdošová	6	6
LL	(Australia) T Patterson	5	3
(Russia) E Bychkova	7	6

Semifinals
PR	(Australia) J Gajdošová	5	3
(Russia) E Bychkova	7	6

=== Bottom half ===
First round
7	(Japan) R Ozaki	1	6	7
WC	(Japan) N Osaka	6	3	5
(Japan) M Imanishi	6	6
(Japan) S Ishizu	4	2
Q	(China) F Liu	6	3	2
WC	(Japan) S Aoyama	4	6	6
Q	(Montenegro) A Veselinović	2	0
3	(Belgium) A-S Mestach	6	6
5	(Japan) E Hozumi	3	4
(United Kingdom) N Broady	6	6
(Japan) M Eguchi	6	6
WC	(Japan) M Ukai	2	4
(Thailand) N Lertcheewakarn	2	3
(Australia) S Sanders	6	6
(Japan) Y Sema	3	3
2	(Hungary) T Babos	6	6

Second round
7	(Japan) R Ozaki	6	7^{7}
(Japan) M Imanishi	2	6^{4}
WC	(Japan) S Aoyama	0	1
3	(Belgium) A-S Mestach	6	6
(United Kingdom) N Broady	7^{8}	6^{5}	4
(Japan) M Eguchi	6^{6}	7^{7}	6
(Australia) S Sanders	1	3
2	(Hungary) T Babos	6	6

Quarterfinals
7	(Japan) R Ozaki	0	6	4
3	(Belgium) A-S Mestach	6	3	6
(Japan) M Eguchi	6	2	3
2	(Hungary) T Babos	4	6	6

Semifinals
3	(Belgium) A-S Mestach	2	5
2	(Hungary) T Babos	6	7
