= 2012 Kangaroo Cup – Singles =

Singles
- 2012 Kangaroo Cup

Final
- Champion: (Japan) Kimiko Date-Krumm
- Runner-up: (Thailand) Noppawan Lertcheewakarn
- Score: 6–1, 5–7, 6–3

Events
Singles	Doubles
← 2011 ·	Kangaroo Cup	· 2013 →

Sachie Ishizu was the defending champion, but chose not to participate.

Kimiko Date-Krumm won the title, defeating Noppawan Lertcheewakarn in the final, 6–1, 5–7, 6–3.

== Seeds ==
1. (Japan) Kimiko Date-Krumm (champion)
2. (Thailand) Tamarine Tanasugarn (first round)
3. (Australia) Casey Dellacqua (second round)
4. (Japan) Erika Sema (semifinals)
5. (Chinese Taipei) Chan Yung-jan (first round)
6. (Japan) Kurumi Nara (semifinals)
7. (Japan) Yurika Sema (first round)
8. (Thailand) Noppawan Lertcheewakarn (final)

== Main draw ==
=== Key ===
- Q = Qualifier
- WC = Wild card
- LL = Lucky loser
- Alt = Alternate
- SE = Special exempt
- PR = Protected ranking
- ITF = ITF entry
- JE = Junior exempt
- w/o = Walkover
- r = Retired
- d = Defaulted
- SR = Special ranking

=== Finals ===
Semifinals
1	(Japan) Kimiko Date-Krumm	6	6
6	(Japan) Kurumi Nara	4	2
4	(Japan) Erika Sema	4	6	5
8	(Thailand) Noppawan Lertcheewakarn	6	4	7

Final
1	(Japan) Kimiko Date-Krumm	6	5	6
8	(Thailand) Noppawan Lertcheewakarn	1	7	3

=== Top half ===
First round
1	(Japan) K Date-Krumm	6	6
(Japan) J Namigata	1	2
(Japan) E Takao	6	6
WC	(Japan) Y Aoki	0	1
WC	(Japan) R Ozaki	6	6
(United Kingdom) E Webley-Smith	1	2
Q	(Chinese Taipei) C-w Chan	6	6
7	(Japan) Y Sema	2	4
3	(Australia) C Dellacqua	6	6
(Ukraine) T Arefyeva	4	4
Q	(Japan) S Aoyama	6	1	1
(China) S Zheng	3	6	6
(South Korea) S-j Kim	6	6
(China) Y Xu	4	3
(Japan) A Nakamura	4	1
6	(Japan) K Nara	6	6

Second round
1	(Japan) K Date-Krumm	6	6
(Japan) E Takao	1	4
WC	(Japan) R Ozaki	6	6
Q	(Chinese Taipei) C-w Chan	1	2
3	(Australia) C Dellacqua	6	4	5
(China) S Zheng	2	6	7
(South Korea) S-j Kim	2	3
6	(Japan) K Nara	6	6

Quarterfinals
1	(Japan) K Date-Krumm	6	6
WC	(Japan) R Ozaki	1	1
(China) S Zheng	3	6	3
6	(Japan) K Nara	6	4	6

Semifinals
1	(Japan) K Date-Krumm	6	6
6	(Japan) K Nara	4	2

=== Bottom half ===
First round
5	(Chinese Taipei) Y-j Chan	5	1
WC	(Japan) M Ninomiya	7	6
(Thailand) L Kumkhum	7	6
(Hong Kong) L Zhang	5	2
(Australia) M Adamczak	1	6^{1}
(United States) J Pegula	6	7^{7}
(Thailand) N Luangnam	6^{6}	6	2
4	(Japan) E Sema	7^{8}	2	6
8	(Thailand) N Lertcheewakarn	6	6
(Austria) N Hofmanova	2	4
WC	(Japan) M Ukai	3	1
(South Korea) S-h Han	6	6
(Japan) M Eguchi	2	2
Q	(China) S Sun	6	6
Q	(China) Y Zhou	6	6
2	(Thailand) T Tanasugarn	2	3

Second round
WC	(Japan) M Ninomiya	3	4
(Thailand) L Kumkhum	6	6
(United States) J Pegula	3	6	5
4	(Japan) E Sema	6	2	7
8	(Thailand) N Lertcheewakarn	6	6
(South Korea) S-h Han	4	2
Q	(China) S Sun	6^{4}	6	1
Q	(China) Y Zhou	7^{7}	1	0^{r}

Quarterfinals
(Thailand) L Kumkhum	6	4	3
4	(Japan) E Sema	3	6	6
8	(Thailand) N Lertcheewakarn	6	7
Q	(China) S Sun	3	5

Semifinals
4	(Japan) E Sema	4	6	5
8	(Thailand) N Lertcheewakarn	6	4	7
