= 2014 Kangaroo Cup – Doubles =

Doubles
- 2014 Kangaroo Cup

Final
- Champions: (Australia) Jarmila Gajdošová (Australia) Arina Rodionova
- Runners-up: (Japan) Misaki Doi (Chinese Taipei) Hsieh Shu-ying
- Score: 6–3, 6–3

Events
Singles	Doubles
← 2013 ·	Kangaroo Cup	· 2015 →

Luksika Kumkhum and Erika Sema were the defending champions, having won the event in 2013, but Kumkhum chose not to participate. Sema partnered with her sister Yurika Sema, but they lost in the first round.

Jarmila Gajdošová and Arina Rodionova won the tournament, defeating Misaki Doi and Hsieh Shu-ying in the final, 6–3, 6–3.

== Seeds ==
1. (Czech Republic) Kristýna Plíšková / (Ukraine) Olga Savchuk (quarterfinals)
2. (Japan) Shuko Aoyama / (Japan) Eri Hozumi (first round)
3. (Australia) Jarmila Gajdošová / (Australia) Arina Rodionova (champion)
4. (Japan) Misaki Doi / (Chinese Taipei) Hsieh Shu-ying (final)

== Draw ==
=== Key ===
- Q = Qualifier
- WC = Wild card
- LL = Lucky loser
- Alt = Alternate
- SE = Special exempt
- PR = Protected ranking
- ITF = ITF entry
- JE = Junior exempt
- w/o = Walkover
- r = Retired
- d = Defaulted
- SR = Special ranking

First round
1	(Czech Republic) Kr Plíšková (Ukraine) O Savchuk	6	6
WC	(Japan) Y Aoki (Japan) M Ukai	3	2
(United Kingdom) S Murray (United Kingdom) J Windley	1	3
(Japan) R Fujiwara (Thailand) T Tanasugarn	6	6
3	(Australia) J Gajdošová (Australia) Ar Rodionova	6	6
WC	(Japan) M Eguchi (Japan) J Namigata	2	0
Q	(Russia) E Bychkova (United Kingdom) E Webley-Smith	7^{9}	5	[5]
(United Kingdom) N Broady (United Kingdom) T Moore	6^{7}	7	[10]
(Japan) M Miyamura (Japan) M Ninomiya	0	3
(Thailand) N Lertpitaksinchai (Thailand) P Plipuech	6	6
WC	(Japan) K Hisami (Japan) S Ishizu	5	2
4	(Japan) M Doi (Chinese Taipei) S-y Hsieh	7	6
(Japan) E Sema (Japan) Y Sema	0	2
(United Kingdom) J Rae (United Kingdom) A Smith	6	6
Q	(Japan) M Imanishi (Japan) M Inoue	2	6	[10]
2	(Japan) S Aoyama (Japan) E Hozumi	6	3	[8]

Quarterfinals
1	(Czech Republic) Kr Plíšková (Ukraine) O Savchuk	1	7	[6]
(Japan) R Fujiwara (Thailand) T Tanasugarn	6	5	[10]
3	(Australia) J Gajdošová (Australia) Ar Rodionova	6	7
(United Kingdom) N Broady (United Kingdom) T Moore	2	5
(Thailand) N Lertpitaksinchai (Thailand) P Plipuech	3	1
4	(Japan) M Doi (Chinese Taipei) S-y Hsieh	6	6
(United Kingdom) J Rae (United Kingdom) A Smith	7	6
Q	(Japan) M Imanishi (Japan) M Inoue	5	2

Semifinals
(Japan) R Fujiwara (Thailand) T Tanasugarn	6^{4}	2
3	(Australia) J Gajdošová (Australia) Ar Rodionova	7^{7}	6
4	(Japan) M Doi (Chinese Taipei) S-y Hsieh	6	6
(United Kingdom) J Rae (United Kingdom) A Smith	4	2

Final
3	(Australia) J Gajdošová (Australia) Ar Rodionova	6	6
4	(Japan) M Doi (Chinese Taipei) S-y Hsieh	3	3
