= 2018 Kangaroo Cup – Doubles =

Doubles
- 2018 Kangaroo Cup

Final
- Champions: (Japan) Rika Fujiwara (Japan) Yuki Naito
- Runners-up: (Russia) Ksenia Lykina (United Kingdom) Emily Webley-Smith
- Score: 7–5, 6–4

Events
Singles	Doubles
← 2017 ·	Kangaroo Cup	· 2019 →

Eri Hozumi and Miyu Kato were the defending champions, but Kato chose to compete at the 2018 J&T Banka Prague Open. Hozumi chose to partner Makoto Ninomiya but lost in the semifinals to Ksenia Lykina and Emily Webley-Smith.

Rika Fujiwara and Yuki Naito won the title, defeating Lykina and Webley-Smith in the final, 7–5, 6–4.

== Seeds ==
1. (Japan) Eri Hozumi / (Japan) Makoto Ninomiya (semifinals)
2. (United Kingdom) Naomi Broady / (United Kingdom) Katy Dunne (semifinals)
3. (United Kingdom) Harriet Dart / (United Kingdom) Laura Robson (quarterfinals)
4. (Japan) Momoko Kobori / (Japan) Hiroko Kuwata (quarterfinals)

== Draw ==
=== Key ===
- Q = Qualifier
- WC = Wild card
- LL = Lucky loser
- Alt = Alternate
- SE = Special exempt
- PR = Protected ranking
- ITF = ITF entry
- JE = Junior exempt
- w/o = Walkover
- r = Retired
- d = Defaulted
- SR = Special ranking

=== Draw ===
First round
1	(Japan) E Hozumi (Japan) M Ninomiya	6	6^{3}	[10]
(Japan) A Omae (Japan) K Takahata	2	7^{7}	[4]
(Japan) A Okuno (Australia) T Patterson	6	6
Q	(Japan) H Kaji (Japan) A Yoshitomi	4	1
3	(United Kingdom) H Dart (United Kingdom) L Robson	6	2	[12]
(Japan) M Inoue (Japan) K Okamura	4	6	[10]
(Russia) K Lykina (United Kingdom) E Webley-Smith	3	6	[10]
(Japan) E Sema (Papua New Guinea) A Tere-Apisah	6	3	[8]
(Japan) R Fujiwara (Japan) Y Naito	6	7
(United States) YK Chiang (Japan) M Imanishi	1	5
WC	(Japan) S Takoi (Japan) Y Ukai	2	2
4	(Japan) M Kobori (Japan) H Kuwata	6	6
WC	(Japan) E Hayashi (Japan) M Uchijima	6	6
Q	(South Korea) N-l Han (Japan) R Kajitani	4	4
(Japan) C Muramatsu (Japan) J Namigata	4	2
2	(United Kingdom) N Broady (United Kingdom) K Dunne	6	6

Quarterfinals
1	(Japan) E Hozumi (Japan) M Ninomiya	6	6
(Japan) A Okuno (Australia) T Patterson	2	2
3	(United Kingdom) H Dart (United Kingdom) L Robson	3	6^{3}
(Russia) K Lykina (United Kingdom) E Webley-Smith	6	7^{7}
(Japan) R Fujiwara (Japan) Y Naito	6	7
4	(Japan) M Kobori (Japan) H Kuwata	2	5
WC	(Japan) E Hayashi (Japan) M Uchijima	3	4
2	(United Kingdom) N Broady (United Kingdom) K Dunne	6	6

Semifinals
1	(Japan) E Hozumi (Japan) M Ninomiya	6	4	[8]
(Russia) K Lykina (United Kingdom) E Webley-Smith	2	6	[10]
(Japan) R Fujiwara (Japan) Y Naito	7^{7}	6
2	(United Kingdom) N Broady (United Kingdom) K Dunne	6^{4}	2

Final
(Russia) K Lykina (United Kingdom) E Webley-Smith	5	4
(Japan) R Fujiwara (Japan) Y Naito	7	6
