= 2014 Kangaroo Cup =

- Date: 28 April–4 May
- Edition: 18th
- Category: ITF Women's Circuit
- Prize money: $75,000
- Surface: Hard
- Location: Gifu, Japan

Champions

Singles
- (Hungary) Tímea Babos

Doubles
- (Australia) Jarmila Gajdošová / (Australia) Arina Rodionova
| ← 2013 · | Kangaroo Cup | · 2015 → |

The 2014 Kangaroo Cup was a professional tennis tournament played on outdoor hard courts. It was the eighteenth edition of the tournament and part of the 2014 ITF Women's Circuit, offering a total of $75,000 in prize money. It took place in Gifu, Japan, on 28 April–4 May 2014.

== Singles main draw entrants ==
=== Seeds ===
| Country | Player | Rank^{1} | Seed |
|---|---|---|---|
| JPN | Misaki Doi | 100 | 1 |
| HUN | Tímea Babos | 119 | 2 |
| BEL | An-Sophie Mestach | 126 | 3 |
| CZE | Kristýna Plíšková | 135 | 4 |
| JPN | Eri Hozumi | 166 | 5 |
| CHN | Duan Yingying | 171 | 6 |
| JPN | Risa Ozaki | 181 | 7 |
| JPN | Erika Sema | 184 | 8 |

- ^{1} Rankings as of 21 April 2014

=== Other entrants ===
The following players received wildcards into the singles main draw:

- (Japan) Yurika Aoki
- (Japan) Shuko Aoyama
- (Japan) Naomi Osaka
- (Japan) Miki Ukai

The following players received entry from the qualifying draw:

- (China) Liu Fangzhou
- (Japan) Yumi Miyazaki
- (Japan) Junri Namigata
- (Montenegro) Ana Veselinović

The following player received entry by a lucky loser spot:

- (Australia) Tammi Patterson

The following player received entry with a protected ranking:

- (Australia) Jarmila Gajdošová

== Champions ==
=== Singles ===
- (Hungary) Tímea Babos def. (Russia) Ekaterina Bychkova 6–1, 6–2

=== Doubles ===
- (Australia) Jarmila Gajdošová / (Australia) Arina Rodionova def. (Japan) Misaki Doi / (Chinese Taipei) Hsieh Shu-ying 6–3, 6–3
