= 2013 Kangaroo Cup – Doubles =

Doubles
- 2013 Kangaroo Cup

Final
- Champions: (Thailand) Luksika Kumkhum (Japan) Erika Sema
- Runners-up: (Japan) Nao Hibino (Japan) Riko Sawayanagi
- Score: 6–4, 6–3

Events
Singles	Doubles
← 2012 ·	Kangaroo Cup	· 2014 →

Jessica Pegula and Zheng Saisai were the defending champions, having won the event in 2012, but Pegula chose not to participate. Zheng paired up with Xu Yifan, but they lost in the quarterfinals.

Luksika Kumkhum and Erika Sema won the event, defeating Nao Hibino and Riko Sawayanagi in the final, 6–4, 6–3.

== Seeds ==
1. (China) Xu Yifan / (China) Zheng Saisai (quarterfinals)
2. (Japan) Miki Miyamura / (Thailand) Varatchaya Wongteanchai (semifinals)
3. (Thailand) Luksika Kumkhum / (Japan) Erika Sema (champions)
4. (Thailand) Noppawan Lertcheewakarn / (Japan) Yurika Sema (quarterfinals)

== Draw ==
=== Key ===
- Q = Qualifier
- WC = Wild card
- LL = Lucky loser
- Alt = Alternate
- SE = Special exempt
- PR = Protected ranking
- ITF = ITF entry
- JE = Junior exempt
- w/o = Walkover
- r = Retired
- d = Defaulted
- SR = Special ranking

First round
1	(China) Y Xu (China) S Zheng	6	1	[10]
(Japan) E Hozumi (Japan) M Ninomiya	4	6	[7]
(Uzbekistan) N Abduraimova (Ukraine) V Kapshay	6	4	[10]
(Japan) R Fujiwara (China) S Sun	1	6	[6]
4	(Thailand) N Lertcheewakarn (Japan) Y Sema	6	2	[10]
(Australia) M Adamczak (Japan) J Namigata	2	6	[6]
WC	(Japan) N Hibino (Japan) R Sawayanagi	6	6
WC	(Japan) M Aoki (Japan) Y Aoki	0	0
(Japan) A Inoue (Japan) K Onishi	2	6	[10]
Q	(Ukraine) T Arefyeva (Australia) S Sanders	6	4	[6]
WC	(Japan) H Kuwata (Japan) M Ukai	4	5
3	(Thailand) L Kumkhum (Japan) E Sema	6	7
(Japan) K Hisami (United States) C-y Hsu	1	6^{4}
Q	(Japan) K Ito (Japan) A Yonemura	6	7^{7}
(Russia) K Lykina (United Kingdom) E Webley-Smith	6	4	[3]
2	(Japan) M Miyamura (Thailand) V Wongteanchai	4	6	[10]

Quarterfinals
1	(China) Y Xu (China) S Zheng	4	2
(Uzbekistan) N Abduraimova (Ukraine) V Kapshay	6	6
4	(Thailand) N Lertcheewakarn (Japan) Y Sema	5	4
WC	(Japan) N Hibino (Japan) R Sawayanagi	7	6
(Japan) A Inoue (Japan) K Onishi	4	2
3	(Thailand) L Kumkhum (Japan) E Sema	6	6
Q	(Japan) K Ito (Japan) A Yonemura	3	1
2	(Japan) M Miyamura (Thailand) V Wongteanchai	6	6

Semifinals
(Uzbekistan) N Abduraimova (Ukraine) V Kapshay	1	7	[6]
WC	(Japan) N Hibino (Japan) R Sawayanagi	6	5	[10]
3	(Thailand) L Kumkhum (Japan) E Sema	6	6
2	(Japan) M Miyamura (Thailand) V Wongteanchai	1	1

Final
WC	(Japan) N Hibino (Japan) R Sawayanagi	4	3
3	(Thailand) L Kumkhum (Japan) E Sema	6	6
