= 2016 Kangaroo Cup – Doubles =

Doubles
- 2016 Kangaroo Cup

Final
- Champions: (Japan) Eri Hozumi (Japan) Miyu Kato
- Runners-up: (Japan) Hiroko Kuwata (Japan) Ayaka Okuno
- Score: 6–1, 6–2

Events
| Singles | Doubles |
| ← 2015 · | Kangaroo Cup | · 2017 → |

Wang Yafan and Xu Yifan were the defending champions, but both players chose to participate in Anning and Madrid instead, respectively.

Top seeds Eri Hozumi and Miyu Kato won the title, defeating Hiroko Kuwata and Ayaka Okuno in an all-Japanese final, 6–1, 6–2.

== Seeds ==
1. (Japan) Eri Hozumi / (Japan) Miyu Kato (champions)
2. (Japan) Shuko Aoyama / (Japan) Makoto Ninomiya (first round)
3. (Belgium) An-Sophie Mestach / (Australia) Storm Sanders (semifinals)
4. (Japan) Kanae Hisami / (Japan) Kotomi Takahata (first round)

== Draw ==
=== Key ===
- Q = Qualifier
- WC = Wild card
- LL = Lucky loser
- Alt = Alternate
- SE = Special exempt
- PR = Protected ranking
- ITF = ITF entry
- JE = Junior exempt
- w/o = Walkover
- r = Retired
- d = Defaulted
- SR = Special ranking

First round
1 | (Japan) E Hozumi (Japan) M Kato | 2 | 7 | [11]
(Japan) A Omae (Thailand) P Plipuech | 6 | 5 | [9]
(South Korea) J-h Choi (Thailand) N Lertpitaksinchai | 6 | 6
(Japan) M Ayukawa (Japan) E Sema | 4 | 2
3 | (Belgium) A-S Mestach (Australia) S Sanders | 6 | 6
WC | (Japan) R Kajitani (Japan) A Yoshitomi | 1 | 2
Q | (Thailand) L Kumkhum (Japan) Y Tanaka | 5 | 7^{7} | [10]
(South Korea) N-l Han (South Korea) S-j Jang | 7 | 6^{4} | [2]
WC | (Japan) M Date (Japan) M Ukai | 0 | 1
(Japan) H Kuwata (Japan) A Okuno | 6 | 6
Q | (Netherlands) I de Vroome (Japan) M Inoue | 3 | 6 | [10]
4 | (Japan) K Hisami (Japan) K Takahata | 6 | 3 | [8]
WC | (Japan) A Narita (Japan) Y Ukai | 1 | 0
(Japan) R Sawayanagi (China) L Zhu | 6 | 6
(Russia) K Lykina (United Kingdom) E Webley-Smith | 7 | 6
2 | (Japan) S Aoyama (Japan) M Ninomiya | 5 | 1

Quarterfinals
1 | (Japan) E Hozumi (Japan) M Kato | 6 | 6
(South Korea) J-h Choi (Thailand) N Lertpitaksinchai | 4 | 4
3 | (Belgium) A-S Mestach (Australia) S Sanders | 5 | 7 | [10]
Q | (Thailand) L Kumkhum (Japan) Y Tanaka | 7 | 5 | [4]
(Japan) H Kuwata (Japan) A Okuno | 4 | 6 | [10]
Q | (Netherlands) I de Vroome (Japan) M Inoue | 6 | 1 | [4]
(Japan) R Sawayanagi (China) L Zhu | 5 | 4
(Russia) K Lykina (United Kingdom) E Webley-Smith | 7 | 6

Semifinals
1 | (Japan) E Hozumi (Japan) M Kato | 6 | 7^{7}
3 | (Belgium) A-S Mestach (Australia) S Sanders | 4 | 6^{5}
(Japan) H Kuwata (Japan) A Okuno | 6 | 6
(Russia) K Lykina (United Kingdom) E Webley-Smith | 3 | 3

Final
1 | (Japan) E Hozumi (Japan) M Kato | 6 | 6
(Japan) H Kuwata (Japan) A Okuno | 1 | 2
