= 2013 Kangaroo Cup – Singles =

Singles
- 2013 Kangaroo Cup

Final
- Champion: (Belgium) An-Sophie Mestach
- Runner-up: (China) Wang Qiang
- Score: 1–6, 6–3, 6–0

Events
Singles	Doubles
← 2012 ·	Kangaroo Cup	· 2014 →

Kimiko Date-Krumm was the defending champion, having won the event in 2012, but retired in the second round against qualifier An-Sophie Mestach, who went on to win the tournament. She defeated Wang Qiang in the final, 1–6, 6–3, 6–0.

== Seeds ==
1. (Japan) Kimiko Date-Krumm (second round; retired)
2. (China) Duan Yingying (quarterfinals)
3. (Australia) Casey Dellacqua (first round)
4. (Thailand) Luksika Kumkhum (second round)
5. (China) Zheng Saisai (second round)
6. (Japan) Erika Sema (second round)
7. (Australia) Monique Adamczak (second round)
8. (China) Wang Qiang (final)

== Main draw ==
=== Key ===
- Q = Qualifier
- WC = Wild card
- LL = Lucky loser
- Alt = Alternate
- SE = Special exempt
- PR = Protected ranking
- ITF = ITF entry
- JE = Junior exempt
- w/o = Walkover
- r = Retired
- d = Defaulted
- SR = Special ranking

=== Finals ===
Semifinals
Q	(Belgium) An-Sophie Mestach	6	6
(Japan) Yurika Sema	0	1
(Japan) Sachie Ishizu	3	2
8	(China) Wang Qiang	6	6

Final
Q	(Belgium) An-Sophie Mestach	1	6	6
8	(China) Wang Qiang	6	3	0

=== Top half ===
First round
1	(Japan) K Date-Krumm	7	6
(Ukraine) V Kapshay	5	0
Q	(Belgium) A-S Mestach	6	7^{7}
Q	(Ukraine) T Arefyeva	4	6^{5}
(China) S Sun	6	6^{3}	6
Q	(China) Y Hu	3	7^{7}	2
(Thailand) N Luangnam	6	2	3
7	(Australia) M Adamczak	1	6	6
4	(Thailand) L Kumkhum	6	6
(Thailand) N Lertcheewakarn	2	3
(Japan) S Aoyama	6	6
WC	(Japan) Y Aoki	2	1
(China) Y Xu	3	4
(Japan) Y Sema	6	6
(United States) C-y Hsu	2	4
5	(China) S Zheng	6	6

Second round
1	(Japan) K Date-Krumm	3	0^{r}
Q	(Belgium) A-S Mestach	6	4
(China) S Sun	4	6	6
7	(Australia) M Adamczak	6	2	2
4	(Thailand) L Kumkhum	6	4	2
(Japan) S Aoyama	3	6	6
(Japan) Y Sema	6	5	6
5	(China) S Zheng	3	7	2

Quarterfinals
Q	(Belgium) A-S Mestach	1	6	6
(China) S Sun	6	3	3
(Japan) S Aoyama	6	5	2
(Japan) Y Sema	1	7	6

Semifinals
Q	(Belgium) A-S Mestach	6	6
(Japan) Y Sema	0	1

=== Bottom half ===
First round
6	(Japan) E Sema	6	6
(Australia) S Sanders	1	4
WC	(Japan) Y Sano	2	1
(Uzbekistan) N Abduraimova	6	6
(Japan) S Ishizu	6	6
WC	(Japan) H Kuwata	2	3
(Tunisia) O Jabeur	1	6	6
3	(Australia) C Dellacqua	6	4	4
8	(China) Q Wang	6	6
(Thailand) V Wongteanchai	2	1
WC	(Japan) M Ukai	2	2
(Japan) J Namigata	6	6
(Kazakhstan) Z Diyas	6	6
(Russia) K Lykina	4	1
Q	(Japan) C Okadaue	3	1
2	(China) Y Duan	6	6

Second round
6	(Japan) E Sema	6	2	4
(Uzbekistan) N Abduraimova	4	6	6
(Japan) S Ishizu	6	6
(Tunisia) O Jabeur	3	1
8	(China) Q Wang	6	5	6
(Japan) J Namigata	0	7	4
(Kazakhstan) Z Diyas	6	4	1
2	(China) Y Duan	1	6	6

Quarterfinals
(Uzbekistan) N Abduraimova	6^{2}	0
(Japan) S Ishizu	7^{7}	6
8	(China) Q Wang	6	2	6
2	(China) Y Duan	4	6	4

Semifinals
(Japan) S Ishizu	3	2
8	(China) Q Wang	6	6
