= 2017 Kangaroo Cup – Doubles =

Doubles
- 2017 Kangaroo Cup

Final
- Champion: (Japan) Eri Hozumi (Japan) Miyu Kato
- Runner-up: (United Kingdom) Katy Dunne (Israel) Julia Glushko
- Score: 6–4, 6–2

Events
Singles	Doubles
← 2016 ·	Kangaroo Cup	· 2018 →

Eri Hozumi and Miyu Kato were the defending champions and successfully defended their title, defeating Katy Dunne and Julia Glushko in the final, 6–4, 6–2.

== Seeds ==
1. (Japan) Eri Hozumi / (Japan) Miyu Kato (champions)
2. (Australia) Jessica Moore / (Thailand) Varatchaya Wongteanchai (quarterfinals)
3. (Japan) Hiroko Kuwata / (Japan) Akiko Omae (quarterfinals)
4. (Russia) Ksenia Lykina / (Japan) Riko Sawayanagi (first round)

== Draw ==
=== Key ===
- Q = Qualifier
- WC = Wild card
- LL = Lucky loser
- Alt = Alternate
- SE = Special exempt
- PR = Protected ranking
- ITF = ITF entry
- JE = Junior exempt
- w/o = Walkover
- r = Retired
- d = Defaulted
- SR = Special ranking

First round
1	(Japan) E Hozumi (Japan) M Kato	6	6
(United Kingdom) L Robson (Australia) Ar Rodionova	0	3
(Japan) R Fujiwara (China) J Lu	6	7
WC	(Japan) M Ukai (Japan) Y Ukai	2	5
3	(Japan) H Kuwata (Japan) A Omae	6	6
(United States) J Cako (China) L Zhu	3	2
Q	(Thailand) L Kumkhum (Thailand) P Plipuech	6	6
WC	(Japan) E Hayashi (Japan) K Takahata	4	3
Q	(Japan) Y Naito (Australia) O Tjandramulia	4	6	[10]
(Japan) A Okuno (Japan) E Sema	6	2	[4]
(Australia) M Adamczak (Japan) J Namigata	6	3	[10]
4	(Russia) K Lykina (Japan) R Sawayanagi	3	6	[7]
(United Kingdom) K Dunne (Israel) J Glushko	3	7^{7}	[10]
(Japan) M Ayukawa (United Kingdom) E Webley-Smith	6	6^{5}	[5]
WC	(Japan) M Date (Japan) S Takoi	1	5
2	(Australia) J Moore (Thailand) V Wongteanchai	6	7

Quarterfinals
1	(Japan) E Hozumi (Japan) M Kato	6	6
(Japan) R Fujiwara (China) J Lu	1	4
3	(Japan) H Kuwata (Japan) A Omae	3	4
Q	(Thailand) L Kumkhum (Thailand) P Plipuech	6	6
Q	(Japan) Y Naito (Australia) O Tjandramulia	2	6^{3}
(Australia) M Adamczak (Japan) J Namigata	6	7^{7}
(United Kingdom) K Dunne (Israel) J Glushko	6	5	[10]
2	(Australia) J Moore (Thailand) V Wongteanchai	4	7	[6]

Semifinals
1	(Japan) E Hozumi (Japan) M Kato	4	6	[10]
Q	(Thailand) L Kumkhum (Thailand) P Plipuech	6	1	[8]
(Australia) M Adamczak (Japan) J Namigata	4	6^{4}
(United Kingdom) K Dunne (Israel) J Glushko	6	7^{7}

Final
1	(Japan) E Hozumi (Japan) M Kato	6	6
(United Kingdom) K Dunne (Israel) J Glushko	4	2
