= 2023 Kangaroo Cup =

Tennis tournament

- Date: 1–7 May 2023
- Edition: 25th
- Category: ITF Women's World Tennis Tour
- Prize money: $80,000
- Surface: Hard / Outdoor
- Location: Gifu, Japan

Champions

Singles
- (Japan) Himeno Sakatsume

Doubles
- (South Korea) Han Na-lae / (South Korea) Jang Su-jeong
- Kangaroo Cup

The 2023 Kangaroo Cup was a professional tennis tournament played on outdoor hard courts. It was the twenty-fifth edition of the tournament, which was part of the 2023 ITF Women's World Tennis Tour. It took place in Gifu, Japan, between 1 and 7 May 2023.

== Champions ==
=== Singles ===
- (Japan) Himeno Sakatsume def. (United Kingdom) Katie Boulter, 7–5, 6–3

=== Doubles ===
- (South Korea) Han Na-lae / (South Korea) Jang Su-jeong def. (Chinese Taipei) Lee Ya-hsuan / (Chinese Taipei) Wu Fang-hsien, 7–6^{(7–3)}, 2–6, [10–8]

== Singles main draw entrants ==
=== Seeds ===
Country	Player	Rank	Seed
KOR	Jang Su-jeong	118	1
GBR	Katie Boulter	154	2
KOR	Han Na-lae	167	3
CAN	Carol Zhao	176	4
JPN	Mai Hontama	180	5
JPN	Sakura Hosogi	216	6
JPN	Himeno Sakatsume	219	7
USA	Emina Bektas	246	8

- Rankings are as of 24 April 2023.

=== Other entrants ===
The following players received wildcards into the singles main draw:

- (Japan) Yukiko Ikedo
- (Japan) Aoi Ito
- (Japan) Natsumi Kawaguchi
- (Japan) Sara Saito

The following player received entry into the singles main draw using a protected ranking:

- (Japan) Ayano Shimizu

The following players received entry from the qualifying draw:

- (Japan) Haruna Arakawa
- (Japan) Mana Ayukawa
- (Japan) Miho Kuramochi
- (Chinese Taipei) Lee Pei-chi
- (Chinese Taipei) Lee Ya-hsuan
- (Japan) Anri Nagata
- (Australia) Alana Parnaby
- (Japan) Mei Yamaguchi
