= 2018 Kangaroo Cup – Singles =

Singles
- 2018 Kangaroo Cup

Final
- Champion: (Japan) Kurumi Nara
- Runner-up: (Japan) Moyuka Uchijima
- Score: 6–2, 7–6^{(7–4)}

Events
Singles	Doubles
← 2017 ·	Kangaroo Cup	· 2019 →

Magdaléna Rybáriková was the defending champion, but chose not to participate.

Kurumi Nara won the title, defeating Moyuka Uchijima in the final, 6–2, 7–6^{(7–4)}.

== Seeds ==
1. (Japan) Kurumi Nara (champion)
2. (China) Zhu Lin (first round)
3. (Japan) Nao Hibino (semifinals)
4. (United Kingdom) Naomi Broady (quarterfinals)
5. (South Korea) Jang Su-jeong (second round)
6. (United Kingdom) Gabriella Taylor (second round)
7. (Japan) Eri Hozumi (first round)
8. (Japan) Miharu Imanishi (quarterfinals)

== Draw ==
=== Key ===
- Q = Qualifier
- WC = Wild card
- LL = Lucky loser
- Alt = Alternate
- SE = Special exempt
- PR = Protected ranking
- ITF = ITF entry
- JE = Junior exempt
- w/o = Walkover
- r = Retired
- d = Defaulted
- SR = Special ranking

=== Finals ===
Semifinals
1	(Japan) Kurumi Nara	6	6
3	(Japan) Nao Hibino	3	3
Q	(Australia) Abbie Myers	3	7^{8}	1
WC	(Japan) Moyuka Uchijima	6	6^{6}	6

Final
1	(Japan) Kurumi Nara	6	7^{7}
WC	(Japan) Moyuka Uchijima	2	6^{4}

=== Top half ===
First round
1	(Japan) K Nara	6	6
(United Kingdom) K Dunne	2	2
(South Korea) N-l Han	6	6
(Japan) M Minokoshi	2	3
(United Kingdom) H Dart	6	7
(United Kingdom) K Boulter	2	5
(Russia) K Lykina	3	4
6	(United Kingdom) G Taylor	6	6
3	(Japan) N Hibino	6	6
(Japan) J Namigata	0	0
WC	(Japan) C Muramatsu	7	3	7^{10}
(Japan) E Sema	5	6	6^{8}
(Japan) H Kaji	2	4
(Hong Kong) L Zhang	6	6
PR	(Japan) M Eguchi	6	3	3
8	(Japan) M Imanishi	4	6	6

Second round
1	(Japan) K Nara	6	6
(South Korea) N-l Han	2	2
(United Kingdom) H Dart	7	6
6	(United Kingdom) G Taylor	5	3
3	(Japan) N Hibino	6	7^{7}
WC	(Japan) C Muramatsu	3	6^{3}
(Hong Kong) L Zhang	6	4	4
8	(Japan) M Imanishi	4	6	6

Quarterfinals
1	(Japan) K Nara	2	6	6
(United Kingdom) H Dart	6	1	2
3	(Japan) N Hibino	2	7^{7}	6
8	(Japan) M Imanishi	6	6^{3}	1

Semifinals
1	(Japan) K Nara	6	6
3	(Japan) N Hibino	3	3

=== Bottom half ===
First round
5	(South Korea) S-j Jang	6	6
(United Kingdom) L Robson	3	4
(Switzerland) A Sadiković	4	4
Q	(Australia) A Myers	6	6
WC	(Japan) S Takoi	0	3
(Japan) M Hibi	6	6
WC	(Japan) Y Ukai	0	1
4	(United Kingdom) N Broady	6	6
7	(Japan) E Hozumi	3	4
WC	(Japan) M Uchijima	6	6
Q	(Japan) K Okamura	6	6
Q	(Japan) H Kuwata	4	4
Q	(Japan) M Yamaguchi	6	3	3
(Japan) M Kobori	4	6	6
(Japan) M Inoue	6	6
2	(China) L Zhu	4	1

Second round
5	(South Korea) S-j Jang	4	5
Q	(Australia) A Myers	6	7
(Japan) M Hibi	0	4
4	(United Kingdom) N Broady	6	6
WC	(Japan) M Uchijima	4	6	6
Q	(Japan) K Okamura	6	3	3
(Japan) M Kobori	6	6
(Japan) M Inoue	3	3

Quarterfinals
Q	(Australia) A Myers	3	7^{8}	6
4	(United Kingdom) N Broady	6	6^{6}	1
WC	(Japan) M Uchijima	4	6	6
(Japan) M Kobori	6	3	4

Semifinals
Q	(Australia) A Myers	3	7^{8}	1
WC	(Japan) M Uchijima	6	6^{6}	6
