= 2019 Kangaroo Cup – Doubles =

Doubles
- 2019 Kangaroo Cup

Final
- Champions: (China) Duan Yingying (China) Han Xinyun
- Runners-up: (Japan) Akiko Omae (Thailand) Peangtarn Plipuech
- Score: 6–3, 4–6, [10–4]

Events
Singles	Doubles
← 2018 ·	Kangaroo Cup	· 2023 →

Rika Fujiwara and Yuki Naito were the defending champions, but Fujiwara chose not to participate. Naito partnered Erina Hayashi but lost in the first round to Choi Ji-hee and Han Na-lae.

Duan Yingying and Han Xinyun won the title, defeating Akiko Omae and Peangtarn Plipuech in the final, 6–3, 4–6, [10–4].

== Seeds ==
1. (China) Duan Yingying / (China) Han Xinyun (champions)
2. (United Kingdom) Naomi Broady / (Thailand) Luksika Kumkhum (semifinals)
3. (South Korea) Choi Ji-hee / (South Korea) Han Na-lae (semifinals)
4. (Japan) Momoko Kobori / (Japan) Ayano Shimizu (quarterfinals)

== Draw ==
=== Key ===
- Q = Qualifier
- WC = Wild card
- LL = Lucky loser
- Alt = Alternate
- SE = Special exempt
- PR = Protected ranking
- ITF = ITF entry
- JE = Junior exempt
- w/o = Walkover
- r = Retired
- d = Defaulted
- SR = Special ranking

=== Draw ===
First round
1	(China) Y Duan (China) X Han	6	7^{7}
WC	(Japan) A Toyoshi (Japan) Y Ukai	1	6^{3}
(United States) K Ahn (United States) E Shibahara	6	6
(Uzbekistan) S Sharipova (Australia) O Tjandramulia	2	4
3	(South Korea) J-h Choi (South Korea) N-l Han	6^{14}	6	[11]
WC	(Japan) E Hayashi (Japan) Y Naito	7^{16}	4	[9]
(Japan) H Kuwata (India) A Raina	2	2
(Japan) A Okuno (China) L Zhu	6	6
(China) F Liu (Japan) M Minokoshi	3	5
(Japan) A Omae (Thailand) P Plipuech	6	7
(United States) E Bektas (United Kingdom) T Moore	7	6^{0}	[5]
4	(Japan) M Kobori (Japan) A Shimizu	5	7^{7}	[10]
WC	(Japan) H Arakawa (Japan) C Muramatsu	7^{7}	6^{2}	[10]
(Australia) A Bai (Indonesia) J Rompies	6^{4}	7^{7}	[3]
(China) S Ma (China) X You	3	6^{3}
2	(United Kingdom) N Broady (Thailand) L Kumkhum	6	7^{7}

Quarterfinals
1	(China) Y Duan (China) X Han	6^{4}	6	[10]
(United States) K Ahn (United States) E Shibahara	7^{7}	2	[2]
3	(South Korea) J-h Choi (South Korea) N-l Han	6	6
(Japan) A Okuno (China) L Zhu	1	3
(Japan) A Omae (Thailand) P Plipuech	6	6
4	(Japan) M Kobori (Japan) A Shimizu	4	3
WC	(Japan) H Arakawa (Japan) C Muramatsu	3	3
2	(United Kingdom) N Broady (Thailand) L Kumkhum	6	6

Semifinals
1	(China) Y Duan (China) X Han	6	7^{9}
3	(South Korea) J-h Choi (South Korea) N-l Han	4	6^{7}
(Japan) A Omae (Thailand) P Plipuech	6	7^{7}
2	(United Kingdom) N Broady (Thailand) L Kumkhum	1	6^{5}

Final
1	(China) Y Duan (China) X Han	6	4	[10]
(Japan) A Omae (Thailand) P Plipuech	3	6	[4]
