= 2023 Kangaroo Cup – Doubles =

Doubles
- 2023 Kangaroo Cup

Final
- Champions: (South Korea) Han Na-lae (South Korea) Jang Su-jeong
- Runners-up: (Chinese Taipei) Lee Ya-hsuan (Chinese Taipei) Wu Fang-hsien
- Score: 7–6^{(7–3)}, 2–6, [10–8]

Events
Singles	Doubles
← 2019 ·	Kangaroo Cup	· 2024 →

Duan Yingying and Han Xinyun were the defending champions but chose not to participate.

Han Na-lae and Jang Su-jeong won the title, defeating Lee Ya-hsuan and Wu Fang-hsien in the final, 7–6^{(7–3)}, 2–6, [10–8].

== Seeds ==
1. (South Korea) Han Na-lae / (South Korea) Jang Su-jeong (champions)
2. (Chinese Taipei) Lee Ya-hsuan / (Chinese Taipei) Wu Fang-hsien (final)
3. (Chinese Taipei) Liang En-shuo / (China) Ma Yexin (first round)
4. (Thailand) Luksika Kumkhum / (Thailand) Peangtarn Plipuech (first round)

== Draw ==
=== Key ===
- Q = Qualifier
- WC = Wild card
- LL = Lucky loser
- Alt = Alternate
- SE = Special exempt
- PR = Protected ranking
- ITF = ITF entry
- JE = Junior exempt
- w/o = Walkover
- r = Retired
- d = Defaulted
- SR = Special ranking

First round
1	(South Korea) N-l Han (South Korea) S-j Jang	6	6
(Japan) S Imamura (Japan) F Kozaki	2	1
(Japan) K Morisaki (Japan) E Sema	6	6
(Japan) M Ayukawa (Australia) A Parnaby	4	3
3	(Chinese Taipei) E-s Liang (China) Y Ma	4	2
(Japan) M Hontama (Japan) K Okamura	6	6
(Japan) H Arakawa (Japan) N Arakawa	6	6
WC	(Japan) Y Ikedo (Japan) M Kimura	0	2
(Japan) R Saigo (Japan) Y Saigo	6	6
WC	(Japan) A Nagata (Japan) R Tsuda	3	1
(United States) E Bektas (Israel) L Glushko	6	6
4	(Thailand) L Kumkhum (Thailand) P Plipuech	3	4
(Japan) E Hayashi (Japan) M Kobori	2	2
(Japan) A Ito (Chinese Taipei) P-c Lee	6	6
WC	(Japan) S Saito (Japan) A Shimizu	5	4
2	(Chinese Taipei) Y-h Lee (Chinese Taipei) F-h Wu	7	6

Quarterfinals
1	(South Korea) N-l Han (South Korea) S-j Jang	6	6
(Japan) K Morisaki (Japan) E Sema	0	1
(Japan) M Hontama (Japan) K Okamura	7	4	[11]
(Japan) H Arakawa (Japan) N Arakawa	5	6	[9]
(Japan) R Saigo (Japan) Y Saigo	0	1
(United States) E Bektas (Israel) L Glushko	6	6
(Japan) A Ito (Chinese Taipei) P-c Lee	6	3	[12]
2	(Chinese Taipei) Y-h Lee (Chinese Taipei) F-h Wu	4	6	[14]

Semifinals
1	(South Korea) N-l Han (South Korea) S-j Jang	6	3	[10]
(Japan) M Hontama (Japan) K Okamura	1	6	[8]
(United States) E Bektas (Israel) L Glushko	6	4	[9]
2	(Chinese Taipei) Y-h Lee (Chinese Taipei) F-h Wu	1	6	[11]

Final
1	(South Korea) N-l Han (South Korea) S-j Jang	7^{7}	2	[10]
2	(Chinese Taipei) Y-h Lee (Chinese Taipei) F-h Wu	6^{3}	6	[8]
