= 2019 Kangaroo Cup – Singles =

Singles
- 2019 Kangaroo Cup

Final
- Champion: (Kazakhstan) Zarina Diyas
- Runner-up: (Chinese Taipei) Liang En-shuo
- Score: 6–0, 6–2

Events
Singles	Doubles
← 2018 ·	Kangaroo Cup	· 2023 →

Kurumi Nara was the defending champion, but lost to Zarina Diyas in the quarterfinals.

Diyas won the title, defeating Liang En-shuo in the final, 6–0, 6–2.

== Seeds ==
1. (China) Zhu Lin (second round)
2. (Thailand) Luksika Kumkhum (second round)
3. (Kazakhstan) Zarina Diyas (champion)
4. (Japan) Nao Hibino (first round)
5. (United Kingdom) Heather Watson (first round)
6. (China) Liu Fangzhou (second round)
7. (Uzbekistan) Sabina Sharipova (first round)
8. (United States) Danielle Lao (second round)

== Draw ==
=== Key ===
- Q = Qualifier
- WC = Wild card
- LL = Lucky loser
- Alt = Alternate
- SE = Special exempt
- PR = Protected ranking
- ITF = ITF entry
- JE = Junior exempt
- w/o = Walkover
- r = Retired
- d = Defaulted
- SR = Special ranking

=== Finals ===
Semifinals
(Chinese Taipei) Liang En-shuo	4	6	7^{7}
Q	(Japan) Kyōka Okamura	6	0	6^{4}
3	(Kazakhstan) Zarina Diyas	1	6	6
Q	(Australia) Maddison Inglis	6	4	1

Final
(Chinese Taipei) Liang En-shuo	0	2
3	(Kazakhstan) Zarina Diyas	6	6

=== Top half ===
First round
1	(China) L Zhu	4	6	7
(China) K Zhang	6	4	5
WC	(Japan) Y Ukai	1	1
(Chinese Taipei) E-s Liang	6	6
(Japan) H Kuwata	3	2
(China) X Han	6	6
(Japan) A Shimizu	6	2	7^{8}
7	(Uzbekistan) S Sharipova	2	6	6^{6}
4	(Japan) N Hibino	6^{6}	6^{6}
Q	(Japan) K Okamura	7^{8}	7^{8}
Q	(Japan) H Kaji	6^{3}	1
(Japan) M Hibi	7^{7}	6
Q	(United Kingdom) N Broady	4	5
(South Korea) N-l Han	6	7
Q	(Japan) A Omae	6	6
5	(United Kingdom) H Watson	4	4

Second round
1	(China) L Zhu	1	6	6^{4}
(Chinese Taipei) E-s Liang	6	4	7^{7}
(China) X Han	6	2	6
(Japan) A Shimizu	3	6	2
Q	(Japan) K Okamura	6	2	6
(Japan) M Hibi	3	6	4
(South Korea) N-l Han	6	4	1
Q	(Japan) A Omae	1	6	6

Quarterfinals
(Chinese Taipei) E-s Liang	6	6
(China) X Han	2	2
Q	(Japan) K Okamura	7	6
Q	(Japan) A Omae	5	3

Semifinals
(Chinese Taipei) E-s Liang	4	6	7^{7}
Q	(Japan) K Okamura	6	0	6^{4}

=== Bottom half ===
First round
6	(China) F Liu	6	6
WC	(Japan) M Hontama	1	4
(Japan) K Nara	6	6
(India) A Raina	0	3
(Japan) M Kobori	6^{5}	0
Q	(China) Y Yuan	7^{7}	6
(United States) J Loeb	0	1
3	(Kazakhstan) Z Diyas	6	6
8	(United States) D Lao	6	6
WC	(Japan) C Muramatsu	3	1
(United States) K Ahn	2	3
(Japan) R Ozaki	6	6
WC	(Japan) Y Naito	3	4
Q	(Australia) M Inglis	6	6
(China) S Ma	3	3
2	(Thailand) L Kumkhum	6	6

Second round
6	(China) F Liu	2	2
(Japan) K Nara	6	6
Q	(China) Y Yuan	5	2
3	(Kazakhstan) Z Diyas	7	6
8	(United States) D Lao	2	3
(Japan) R Ozaki	6	6
Q	(Australia) M Inglis	6	2	6
2	(Thailand) L Kumkhum	4	6	3

Quarterfinals
(Japan) K Nara	6	6^{3}	2
3	(Kazakhstan) Z Diyas	2	7^{7}	6
(Japan) R Ozaki	7^{7}	2	2
Q	(Australia) M Inglis	6^{1}	6	6

Semifinals
3	(Kazakhstan) Z Diyas	1	6	6
Q	(Australia) M Inglis	6	4	1
