= 2023 Kangaroo Cup – Singles =

Singles
- 2023 Kangaroo Cup

Final
- Champion: (Japan) Himeno Sakatsume
- Runner-up: (United Kingdom) Katie Boulter
- Score: 7–5, 6–3

Events
Singles	Doubles
← 2019 ·	Kangaroo Cup	· 2024 →

Zarina Diyas was the defending champion but chose not to participate.

Himeno Sakatsume won the title, defeating Katie Boulter in the final, 7–5, 6–3.

== Seeds ==
1. (South Korea) Jang Su-jeong (semifinals)
2. (United Kingdom) Katie Boulter (final)
3. (South Korea) Han Na-lae (second round)
4. (Canada) Carol Zhao (first round)
5. (Japan) Mai Hontama (quarterfinals)
6. (Japan) Sakura Hosogi (first round)
7. (Japan) Himeno Sakatsume (champion)
8. (United States) Emina Bektas (first round)

== Draw ==
=== Key ===
- Q = Qualifier
- WC = Wild card
- LL = Lucky loser
- Alt = Alternate
- SE = Special exempt
- PR = Protected ranking
- ITF = ITF entry
- JE = Junior exempt
- w/o = Walkover
- r = Retired
- d = Defaulted
- SR = Special ranking

=== Finals ===
Semifinals
1	(South Korea) Jang Su-jeong	4	3
7	(Japan) Himeno Sakatsume	6	6
Q	(Chinese Taipei) Lee Ya-hsuan	1	0
2	(United Kingdom) Katie Boulter	6	6

Final
7	(Japan) Himeno Sakatsume	7	6
2	(United Kingdom) Katie Boulter	5	3

=== Top half ===
First round
1	(South Korea) S-j Jang	6	7
Q	(Australia) A Parnaby	1	5
(Thailand) L Kumkhum	4	4
Q	(Japan) M Kuramochi	6	6
(Japan) R Saigo	6	7
Q	(Japan) A Nagata	2	5
(Thailand) L Tararudee	1	6	7
6	(Japan) S Hosogi	6	3	5
3	(South Korea) N-l Han	6	6
(Thailand) P Plipuech	2	3
(Japan) K Okamura	2	4
(Japan) H Kaji	6	6
(Israel) L Glushko	2	3
(Australia) M Inglis	6	6
WC	(Japan) Y Ikedo	0	0
7	(Japan) H Sakatsume	6	6

Second round
1	(South Korea) S-j Jang	6	7^{7}
Q	(Japan) M Kuramochi	4	6^{2}
(Japan) R Saigo	6	6
(Thailand) L Tararudee	4	2
3	(South Korea) N-l Han	3	6	6^{5}
(Japan) H Kaji	6	3	7^{7}
(Australia) M Inglis	1	2^{r}
7	(Japan) H Sakatsume	6	3

Quarterfinals
1	(South Korea) S-j Jang	6	6
(Japan) R Saigo	0	0
(Japan) H Kaji	6	1	1
7	(Japan) H Sakatsume	2	6	6

Semifinals
1	(South Korea) S-j Jang	4	3
7	(Japan) H Sakatsume	6	6

=== Bottom half ===
First round
8	(United States) E Bektas	4	3
WC	(Japan) S Saito	6	6
(Japan) M Kobori	0	1^{r}
Q	(Japan) M Yamaguchi	6	2
PR	(Japan) A Shimizu	6	6
WC	(Japan) N Kawaguchi	1	3
Q	(Chinese Taipei) Y-h Lee	7^{7}	6
4	(Canada) C Zhao	6^{4}	2
5	(Japan) M Hontama	6	6
Q	(Japan) H Arakawa	1	0
(China) Y Ma	2	1
WC	(Japan) A Ito	6	6
(Chinese Taipei) E-s Liang	7^{7}	4	4
Q	(Chinese Taipei) P-c Lee	6^{3}	6	6
Q	(Japan) M Ayukawa	3	0
2	(United Kingdom) K Boulter	6	6

Second round
WC	(Japan) S Saito	5	6	6
Q	(Japan) M Yamaguchi	7	4	3
PR	(Japan) A Shimizu	3	5
Q	(Chinese Taipei) Y-h Lee	6	7
5	(Japan) M Hontama	7	6
WC	(Japan) A Ito	5	1
Q	(Chinese Taipei) P-c Lee	2	1
2	(United Kingdom) K Boulter	6	6

Quarterfinals
WC	(Japan) S Saito	2	2
Q	(Chinese Taipei) Y-h Lee	6	6
5	(Japan) M Hontama	4	6^{1}
2	(United Kingdom) K Boulter	6	7^{7}

Semifinals
Q	(Chinese Taipei) Y-h Lee	1	0
2	(United Kingdom) K Boulter	6	6
