= 2018 Kangaroo Cup =

- Date: 30 April–6 May
- Category: ITF Women's Circuit
- Prize money: $80,000
- Surface: Hard
- Location: Gifu, Japan

Champions

Singles
- (Japan) Kurumi Nara

Doubles
- (Japan) Rika Fujiwara / (Japan) Yuki Naito
- Kangaroo Cup

The 2018 Kangaroo Cup was a professional tennis tournament played on outdoor hard courts. It was part of the 2018 ITF Women's Circuit and took place in Gifu, Japan, on 30 April–6 May 2018. Kurumi Nara won the singles title, while Rika Fujiwara and Yuki Naito won the doubles title.

== Tournament ==
The tournament took place at Nagaragawa Tennis Plaza at the Gifu Memorial Center under the promotional name "Kangaroo Cup International Ladies Open Tennis". Prize money for the tournament was US$80,000, and the singles draw had 32 players, with 32 more in qualifying. The doubles draw had 16 pairs.

== Singles main draw entrants ==
=== Seeds ===
Country	Player	Rank^{1}	Seed
JPN	Kurumi Nara	102	1
CHN	Zhu Lin	125	2
JPN	Nao Hibino	129	3
GBR	Naomi Broady	134	4
KOR	Jang Su-jeong	176	5
GBR	Gabriella Taylor	177	6
JPN	Eri Hozumi	180	7
JPN	Miharu Imanishi	194	8

- ^{1} Rankings as of 23 April 2018.

=== Other entrants ===
The following players received a wildcard into the singles main draw:

- (Japan) Chihiro Muramatsu
- (Japan) Suzuka Takoi
- (Japan) Moyuka Uchijima
- (Japan) Yuki Ukai

The following player received entry using a protected ranking:

- (Japan) Misa Eguchi

The following players received entry from the qualifying draw:

- (Japan) Hiroko Kuwata
- (Australia) Abbie Myers
- (Japan) Kyōka Okamura
- (Japan) Mei Yamaguchi

== Champions ==
=== Singles ===
- (Japan) Kurumi Nara def. (Japan) Moyuka Uchijima, 6–2, 7–6^{(7–4)}

Nara was the top seed in the singles, and in the final on 6 May 2018, she won her first title at the tournament. She beat 16-year-old Moyuka Uchijima, who had played on a wildcard after national team coach Shinji Yoshikawa had asked the organizers to give her one. About two weeks earlier, Uchijima had traveled with Japan's Fed Cup team as a support member, and Nara had picked her as a practice partner.

Uchijima led early in the final, but Nara then won ten games in a row to come within a game of victory. Uchijima won five straight games to force a tiebreak and led early in it, but Nara won. In the tiebreak, a loose drop shot from Uchijima turned out to be the turning point, and the match ended when her backhand went long. The match lasted 1 hour and 28 minutes.

In tears at the ceremony, Uchijima said she wanted to become a player who competes around the world, like Nara. Reaching the final took her inside the top 400 of the world rankings. Nara said she had not expected to face Uchijima in a final so soon.

=== Doubles ===
- (Japan) Rika Fujiwara / (Japan) Yuki Naito def. (Russia) Ksenia Lykina / (United Kingdom) Emily Webley-Smith, 7–5, 6–4

Fujiwara and Naito's win over Ksenia Lykina and Emily Webley-Smith was the pair's 12th straight match win and their third title together.
