= Yurika Sema =

Japanese tennis player (born 1986)

Yurika Sema 瀬間 友里加
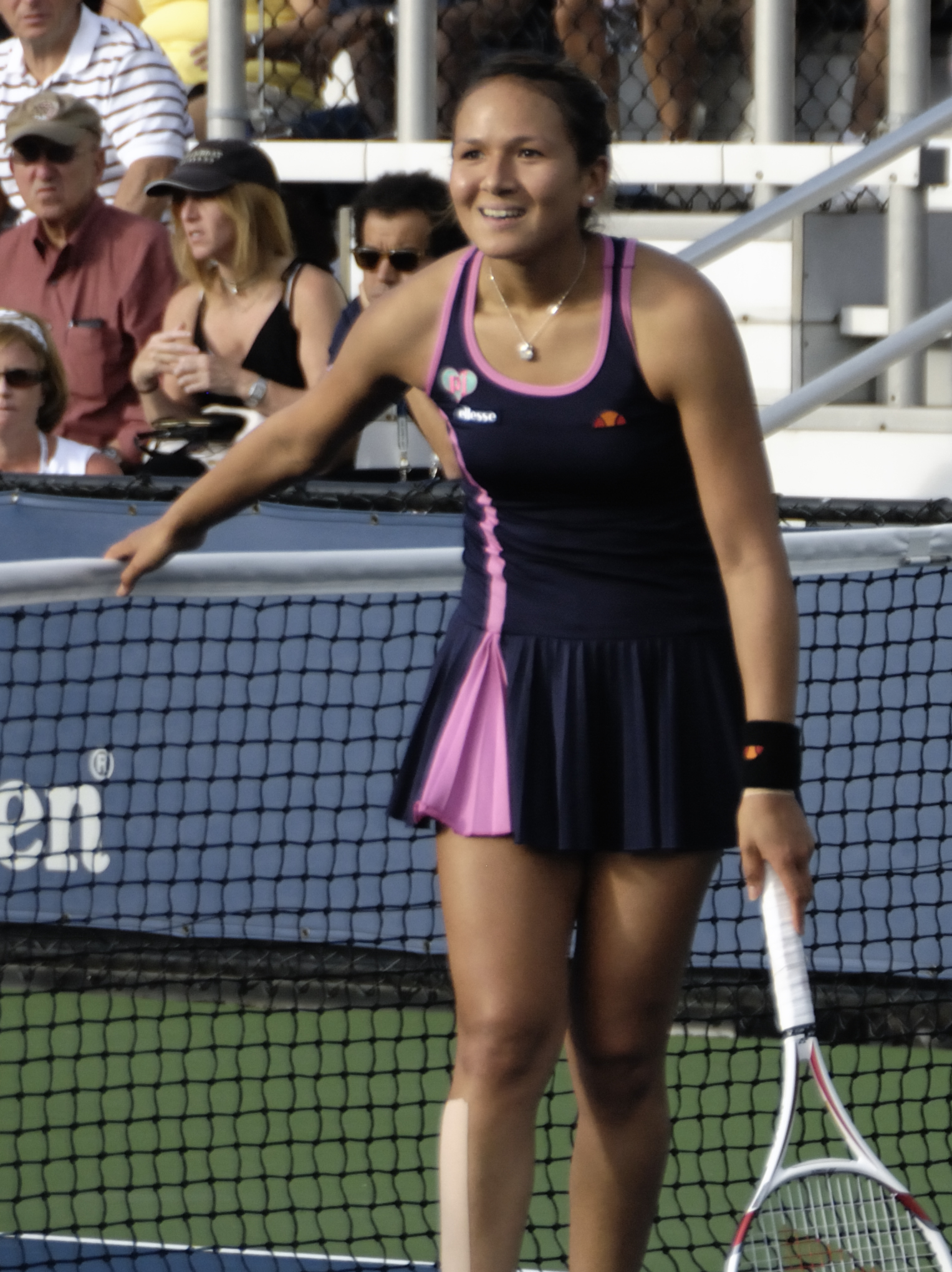
- Yurika Sema in 2009
- Country (sports): Japan
- Residence: Tokyo
- Born: 25 December 1986 (age 39) Nerima, Tokyo
- Turned pro: 2003
- Retired: November 2015
- Plays: Left (two-handed backhand)
- Prize money: $315,569

Singles
- Career record: 338–267
- Career titles: 3 ITF
- Highest ranking: No. 142 (30 November 2009)

Grand Slam singles results
- Australian Open: Q2 (2014)
- French Open: Q2 (2012)
- Wimbledon: Q3 (2012)
- US Open: 1R (2009)

Doubles
- Career record: 215–179
- Career titles: 14 ITF
- Highest ranking: No. 150 (19 April 2010)

Team competitions
- Fed Cup: 3–1

Yurika Sema (瀬間 友里加; born 25 December 1986) is a Japanese former professional tennis player.

== Biography ==
Yurika, whose mother is Japanese and her father is Algerian, achieved her career-high singles ranking of world No. 142 on 30 November 2009, and best doubles ranking of No. 150 on 19 April 2010. She is the older sister of professional tennis player Erika Sema.

She announced that she would play her last tournament at the 90th All-Japan Championships, in November 2015 before retirement.

== ITF Circuit finals ==
$50,000 tournaments
$25,000 tournaments
$10,000 tournaments

=== Singles: 16 (3 titles, 13 runner-ups) ===
Result	No.	Date	Tournament	Surface	Opponent	Score
Loss	1.	Sep 2004	ITF Hiroshima, Japan	Grass	(Australia) Emily Hewson	1–6, 6–7^{(6)}
Win	1.	Oct 2004	ITF Tokyo, Japan	Hard	(Japan) Erika Takao	3–6, 7–6^{(4)}, 6–1
Loss	2.	Sep 2006	ITF Guanzhou, China	Hard	(China) Sun Shengnan	2–6, 4–6
Loss	3.	Mar 2007	ITF Perth, Australia	Hard	(Australia) Casey Dellacqua	2–6, 1–6
Loss	4.	Oct 2008	ITF Port Pirie, Australia	Hard	(United Kingdom) Melanie South	3–6, 4–6
Loss	5.	Nov 2008	ITF Perth, Australia	Hard	(Australia) Monika Wejnert	6–7^{(8)}, 5–7
Loss	6.	Mar 2009	ITF Sydney, Australia	Hard	(China) Zhou Yimiao	3–6, 4–6
Win	2.	Jun 2009	ITF Komoro, Japan	Clay	(Japan) Kurumi Nara	6–3, 1–6, 6–4
Loss	7.	Jul 2009	ITF Zwevegem, Belgium	Clay	(Belgium) Kirsten Flipkens	3–6, 3–6
Loss	8.	Mar 2010	ITF Sydney, Australia	Hard	(Australia) Jarmila Gajdošová	3–6, 3–6
Win	3.	Mar 2011	ITF Sydney, Australia	Hard	(Japan) Rika Fujiwara	6–4, 5–7, 7–6^{(2)}
Loss	9.	May 2011	ITF Changwon, Korea	Hard	(South Africa) Chanel Simmonds	2–6, 2–6
Loss	10.	Jun 2011	ITF Gimcheon, Korea	Hard	(South Korea) Yoo Mi	3–6, 6–3, 1–6
Loss	11.	Oct 2011	ITF Seoul, Korea	Hard	(Chinese Taipei) Hsieh Su-wei	1–6, 0–6
Loss	12.	Mar 2013	ITF Bundaberg, Australia	Clay	(Australia) Viktorija Rajicic	4–6, 3–6
Loss	13.	Sep 2013	ITF Incheon, Korea	Hard	(Japan) Erika Sema	3–6, 4–6

=== Doubles: 27 (14 titles, 13 runner-ups) ===
Result	No.	Date	Tournament	Surface	Partner	Opponents	Score
Loss	1.	29 September 2006	ITF Tokyo, Japan	Hard	(Japan) Mari Tanaka	(Latvia) Līga Dekmeijere > (Japan) Ayami Takase	6–7^{(3)}, 3–6
Loss	2.	14 April 2007	ITF Jackson, United States	Clay	(Japan) Junri Namigata	(Czech Republic) Eva Hrdinová (Czech Republic) Michaela Paštiková	6–7^{(5)}, 6–7^{(3)}
Win	1.	26 October 2007	ITF Traralgon, Australia	Hard	(Japan) Erika Sema	(United States) Courtney Nagle (United States) Robin Stephenson	6–2, 6–2
Loss	3.	18 May 2008	Kurume Cup, Japan	Carpet	(Japan) Erika Sema	(Chinese Taipei) Chang Kai-chen (Chinese Taipei) Hwang I-hsuan	3–6, 6–2, [6–10]
Win	2.	24 May 2008	ITF Nagano, Japan	Carpet	(Japan) Erika Sema	(Japan) Ayaka Maekawa (Chinese Taipei) Hwang I-hsuan	6–3, 2–6, [10–7]
Win	3.	31 May 2008	ITF Gunma, Japan	Carpet	(Japan) Erika Sema	(Chinese Taipei) Chang Kai-chen (Chinese Taipei) Hwang I-hsuan	6–4, 2–6, [10–7]
Loss	4.	6 September 2008	ITF Tsukuba, Japan	Hard	(Japan) Maki Arai	(Chinese Taipei) Chan Chin-wei (Chinese Taipei) Hwang I-hsuan	0–6, 4–6
Loss	5.	17 October 2008	ITF Mount Gambier, Australia	Hard	(Japan) Miki Miyamura	(South Africa) Natalie Grandin (United States) Robin Stephenson	4–6, 2–6
Loss	6.	30 May 2009	ITF Gunma, Japan	Carpet	(Japan) Erika Sema	(Chinese Taipei) Hsu Wen-hsin (Japan) Mari Tanaka	3–6, 6–1, [7–10]
Loss	7.	19 July 2009	ITF Zwevegem, Belgium	Clay	(France) Aurélie Védy	(Russia) Elena Chalova (Croatia) Darija Jurak	1–6, 4–6
Loss	8.	2 August 2009	ITF Bad Saulgau, Germany	Clay	(Croatia) Darija Jurak	(Denmark) Hanne Skak Jensen (Sweden) Johanna Larsson	2–6, 3–6
Loss	9.	9 October 2009	ITF Mount Gambier, Australia	Hard	(Japan) Erika Sema	(Australia) Olivia Rogowska (United Kingdom) Emily Webley-Smith	1–6, 7–5, [7–10]
Win	4.	16 October 2009	ITF Port Pirie, Australia	Hard	(Japan) Erika Sema	(Australia) Alenka Hubacek (Australia) Bojana Bobusic	6–1, 7–5, [10–6]
Win	5.	19 September 2010	ITF Darwin, Australia	Hard	(Japan) Kumiko Iijima	(Australia) Alenka Hubacek (Australia) Tammi Patterson	6–4, 6–1
Win	6.	26 September 2010	ITF Alice Springs, Australia	Hard	(Japan) Erika Sema	(Australia) Alison Bai (Australia) Emelyn Starr	7–5, 6–1
Loss	10.	29 May 2011	ITF Changwon, South Korea	Hard	(Japan) Erika Takao	(Chinese Taipei) Chan Hao-ching (China) Zheng Saisai	2–6, 6–4, [9–11]
Loss	11.	19 June 2011	ITF Balikpapan, Indonesia	Hard	(Japan) Natsumi Hamamura	(Japan) Kanae Hisami (Thailand) Varatchaya Wongteanchai	3–6, 2–6
Win	7.	10 July 2011	ITF Aschaffenburg, Germany	Clay	(Turkey) Pemra Özgen	(Czech Republic) Hana Birnerová (Liechtenstein) Stephanie Vogt	6–4, 7–6^{(5)}
Win	8.	7 May 2012	ITF Tarakan, Indonesia	Hard	(Japan) Chiaki Okadaue	(Vietnam) Huỳnh Phương Đài Trang (South Korea) Lee So-ra	6–4, 7–6^{(4)}
Win	9.	2 July 2012	ITF Middelburg, Netherlands	Clay	(Japan) Junri Namigata	(Netherlands) Bernice van de Velde (Netherlands) Angelique van der Meet	6–3, 6–1
Win	10.	18 February 2013	ITF Mildura, Australia	Grass	(Russia) Ksenia Lykina	(Australia) Bojana Bobusic (United Kingdom) Emily Webley-Smith	6–4, 6–2
Win	11.	31 May 2013	ITF Grado, Italy	Clay	(China) Zhou Yimiao	(Switzerland) Viktorija Golubic (Latvia) Diāna Marcinkēviča	1–6, 7–5, [10–7]
Win	12.	7 June 2013	ITF Brescia, Italy	Clay	(Australia) Monique Adamczak	(Hungary) Réka Luca Jani (Russia) Irina Khromacheva	6–4, 7–5
Win	13.	6 October 2013	ITF Perth, Australia	Hard	(Japan) Erika Sema	(Australia) Monique Adamczak (Australia) Tammi Patterson	7–5, 6–1
Win	14.	27 October 2013	Bendigo International, Australia	Hard	(Japan) Erika Sema	(Australia) Monique Adamczak (Australia) Olivia Rogowska	3–6, 6–2, [11–9]
Loss	12.	17 February 2014	ITF New Delhi, India	Hard	(Japan) Erika Sema	(Thailand) Nicha Lertpitaksinchai (Thailand) Peangtarn Plipuech	6–7, 3–6
Loss	13.	31 March 2014	ITF Jackson, United States	Clay	(Japan) Erika Sema	(South Africa) Chanel Simmonds (Slovenia) Maša Zec Peškirič	7–6, 3–6, [5–10]
