= Riko Sawayanagi =

Japanese tennis player (born 1994)

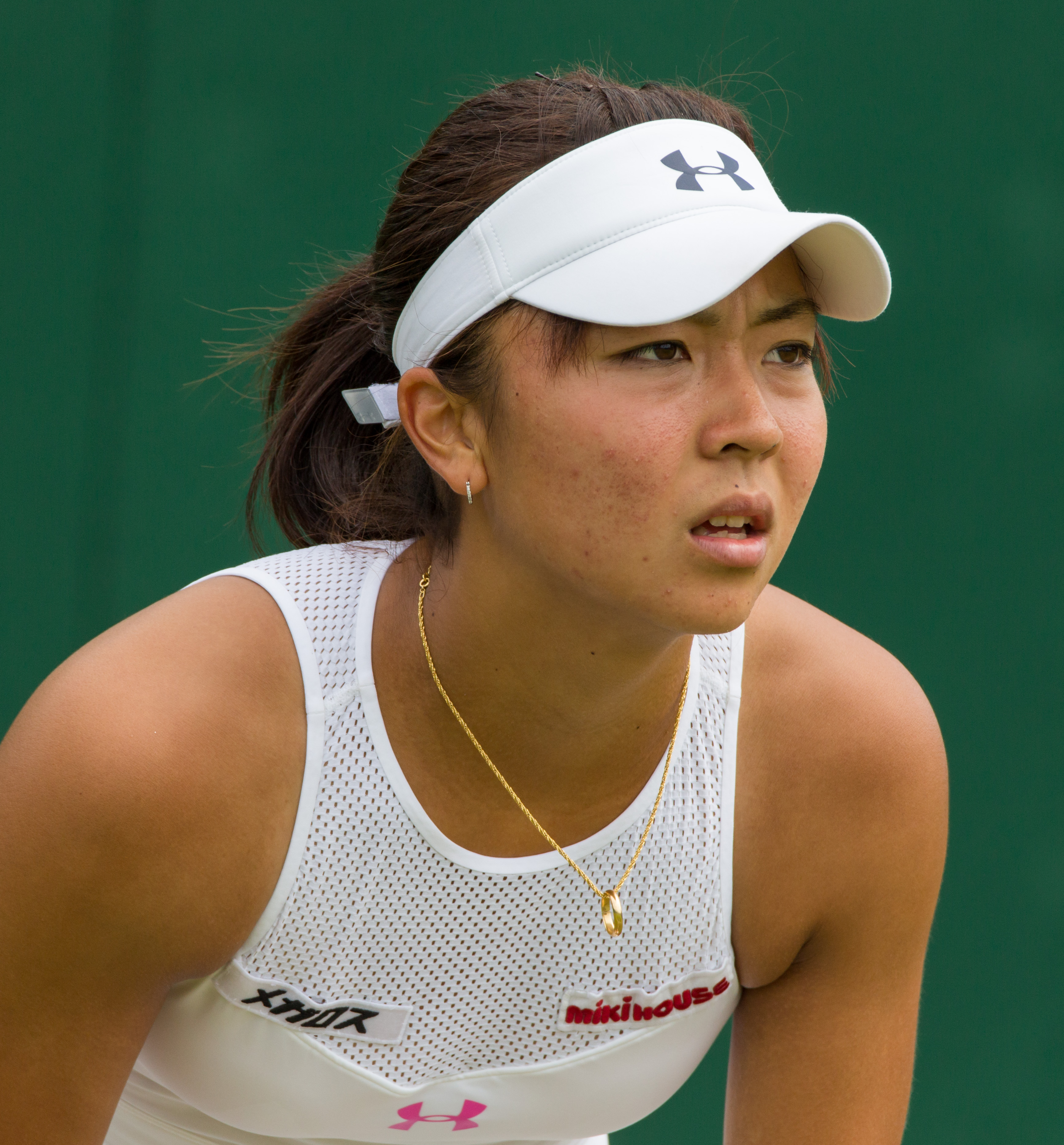
- Riko at the 2015 Wimbledon qualifying
- Country (sports): Japan
- Born: 25 October 1994 (age 31) Hakodate, Hokkaido
- Height: 1.63 m (5 ft 4 in)
- Plays: Right (two-handed backhand)
- Prize money: $187,859

Singles
- Career record: 241–191
- Career titles: 3 ITF
- Highest ranking: No. 178 (5 October 2015)

Doubles
- Career record: 163–128
- Career titles: 11 ITF
- Highest ranking: No. 142 (17 July 2017)

Riko Sawayanagi (澤柳 璃子, Sawayanagi Riko; born 25 October 1994) is an inactive Japanese tennis player.

Primarily, Sawayanagi has played mostly on the ITF Women's Circuit where she has won 14 titles, eleven in doubles, including a $75k tournament in Toyota, Japan.

== ITF Circuit finals ==
=== Singles: 9 (3 titles, 6 runner-ups) ===
| Legend $50,000 tournaments $25,000 tournaments $10,000 tournaments | Finals by surface Hard (2–3) Grass (0–1) Carpet (1–2) |

| Result | W–L | Date | Tournament | Tier | Surface | Opponent | Score |
|---|---|---|---|---|---|---|---|
| Loss | 0–1 | Jun 2011 | ITF Mie, Japan | 10,000 | Carpet | (Japan) Miharu Imanishi | 4–6, 3–6 |
| Win | 1–1 | Jun 2014 | ITF Kashiwa, Japan | 10,000 | Hard | (Japan) Junri Namigata | 6–4, 7–6 |
| Win | 2–1 | Oct 2014 | ITF Hamamatsu, Japan | 25,000 | Carpet | (Japan) Junri Namigata | 2–6, 6–2, 6–3 |
| Win | 3–1 | May 2015 | Seoul Open, South Korea | 50,000 | Hard | (South Korea) Jang Su-jeong | 6–4, 6–4 |
| Loss | 3–2 | Jun 2015 | ITF Kashiwa, Japan | 25,000 | Hard | (Japan) Erika Sema | 4–6, 4–6 |
| Loss | 3–3 | Oct 2015 | ITF Makinohara, Japan | 25,000 | Grass | (Poland) Katarzyna Kawa | 7–6^{(6)}, 2–6, 6–7^{(6)} |
| Loss | 3–4 | Oct 2016 | ITF Makinohara, Japan | 25,000 | Carpet | (Russia) Ksenia Lykina | 3–6, 3–6 |
| Loss | 3–5 | Nov 2016 | ITF Chenzhou, China | 25,000 | Hard | (Hungary) Dalma Gálfi | 0–6, 4–6 |
| Loss | 3–6 | Nov 2016 | Pune Championships, India | 25,000 | Hard | (Russia) Irina Khromacheva | 1–6, 1–6 |

=== Doubles: 20 (11 titles, 9 runner-ups) ===
| Legend $75,000 tournaments $50/60,000 tournaments $25,000 tournaments $10/15,000 tournaments | Finals by surface Hard (5–6) Clay (1–1) Grass (1–0) Carpet (4–2) |

| Result | W–L | Date | Tournament | Tier | Surface | Partner | Opponents | Score |
|---|---|---|---|---|---|---|---|---|
| Loss | 0–1 | Jun 2011 | ITF Mie, Japan | 10,000 | Carpet | (Japan) Chihiro Takayama | (France) Shiori Araki (Japan) Risa Hasegawa | 3–6, 6–7^{(3)} |
| Win | 1–1 | Sep 2011 | ITF Kyoto, Japan | 10,000 | Carpet | (Japan) Miyu Kato | (Japan) Kazusa Ito (Japan) Tomoko Taira | 6–4, 7–6^{(5)} |
| Win | 2–1 | Nov 2011 | Toyota World Challenge, Japan | 75,000 | Carpet (i) | (Japan) Makoto Ninomiya | (France) Caroline Garcia (Netherlands) Michaëlla Krajicek | w/o |
| Loss | 2–2 | May 2013 | Kangaroo Cup Gifu, Japan | 50,000 | Hard | (Japan) Nao Hibino | (Thailand) Luksika Kumkhum (Japan) Erika Sema | 4–6, 3–6 |
| Loss | 2–3 | Jun 2013 | ITF Gimcheon, South Korea | 10,000 | Hard | (South Korea) Jang Su-jeong | (South Korea) Kim Na-ri (South Korea) Lee Ye-ra | 3–6, 3–6 |
| Loss | 2–4 | Jun 2013 | ITF Gimcheon, South Korea | 10,000 | Hard | (South Korea) Jang Su-jeong | (South Korea) Kang Seo-kyung (South Korea) Kim Ji-young | 5–7, 1–6 |
| Win | 3–4 | Jul 2014 | Challenger de Granby, Canada | 25,000 | Hard | (Japan) Hiroko Kuwata | (Canada) Erin Routliffe (Canada) Carol Zhao | w/o |
| Win | 4–4 | Sep 2014 | ITF Noto, Japan | 25,000 | Carpet | (Japan) Miyabi Inoue | (Japan) Miki Miyamura (Japan) Chihiro Nunome | 6–3, 7–6^{(2)} |
| Win | 5–4 | May 2015 | Kurume Cup, Japan | 50,000 | Grass | (Japan) Makoto Ninomiya | (Japan) Eri Hozumi (Japan) Junri Namigata | 7–6^{(10)}, 6–3 |
| Win | 6–4 | Feb 2016 | ITF Port Pirie, Australia | 25,000 | Hard | (Chinese Taipei) Lee Ya-hsuan | (Australia) Ashleigh Barty (Australia) Casey Dellacqua | 6–4, 7–5 |
| Win | 7–4 | Oct 2016 | ITF Makinohara, Japan | 25,000 | Carpet | (Russia) Ksenia Lykina | (Japan) Rika Fujiwara (Japan) Erika Sema | 6–4, 6–1 |
| Loss | 7–5 | Jan 2017 | ITF Hong Kong, China | 25,000 | Hard | (Russia) Ksenia Lykina | (Japan) Hiroko Kuwata (Japan) Akiko Omae | 1–6, 0–6 |
| Win | 8–5 | Feb 2017 | Burnie International, Australia | 60,000 | Hard | (Czech Republic) Barbora Štefková | (Australia) Alison Bai (Thailand) Varatchaya Wongteanchai | 7–6^{(6)}, 4–6, [10–7] |
| Win | 9–5 | Feb 2017 | ITF Perth, Australia | 25,000 | Hard | (Japan) Junri Namigata | (Romania) Irina Bara (India) Prarthana Thombare | 7–6^{(5)}, 4–6, [11–9] |
| Win | 10–5 | Feb 2017 | ITF Perth, Australia | 25,000 | Hard | (Japan) Junri Namigata | (Australia) Tammi Patterson (Australia) Olivia Rogowska | 4–6, 7–5, [10–6] |
| Loss | 10–6 | Jun 2017 | Kōfu International, Japan | 25,000 | Hard | (Japan) Hiroko Kuwata | (Japan) Rika Fujiwara (Japan) Kyōka Okamura | 6–7^{(4)}, 3–6 |
| Loss | 10–7 | Sep 2021 | ITF Cairo, Egypt | W15 | Clay | (United States) Anastasia Nefedova | (Italy) Giorgia Pinto (Italy) Gaia Squarcialupi | 4–6, 6–0, [5–10] |
| Win | 11–7 | Apr 2022 | ITF Antalya, Turkey | W15 | Clay | (Japan) Misaki Matsuda | (Japan) Rina Saigo (Japan) Yukina Saigo | 7–6, 6–2 |
| Loss | 11–8 | Sep 2022 | ITF Yeongwol, South Korea | W15 | Hard | (Japan) Junri Namigata | (South Korea) Back Da-yeon (South Korea) Lee Eun-hye | 5–7, 6–3, [11–13] |
| Loss | 11–9 | Oct 2022 | ITF Makinohara, Japan | W25 | Carpet | (Japan) Mana Ayukawa | (Japan) Mayuka Aikawa (Japan) Momoko Kobori | 4–6, 5–7, [7–10] |
