= Miyu Kato (tennis) =

Japanese tennis player (born 1994)

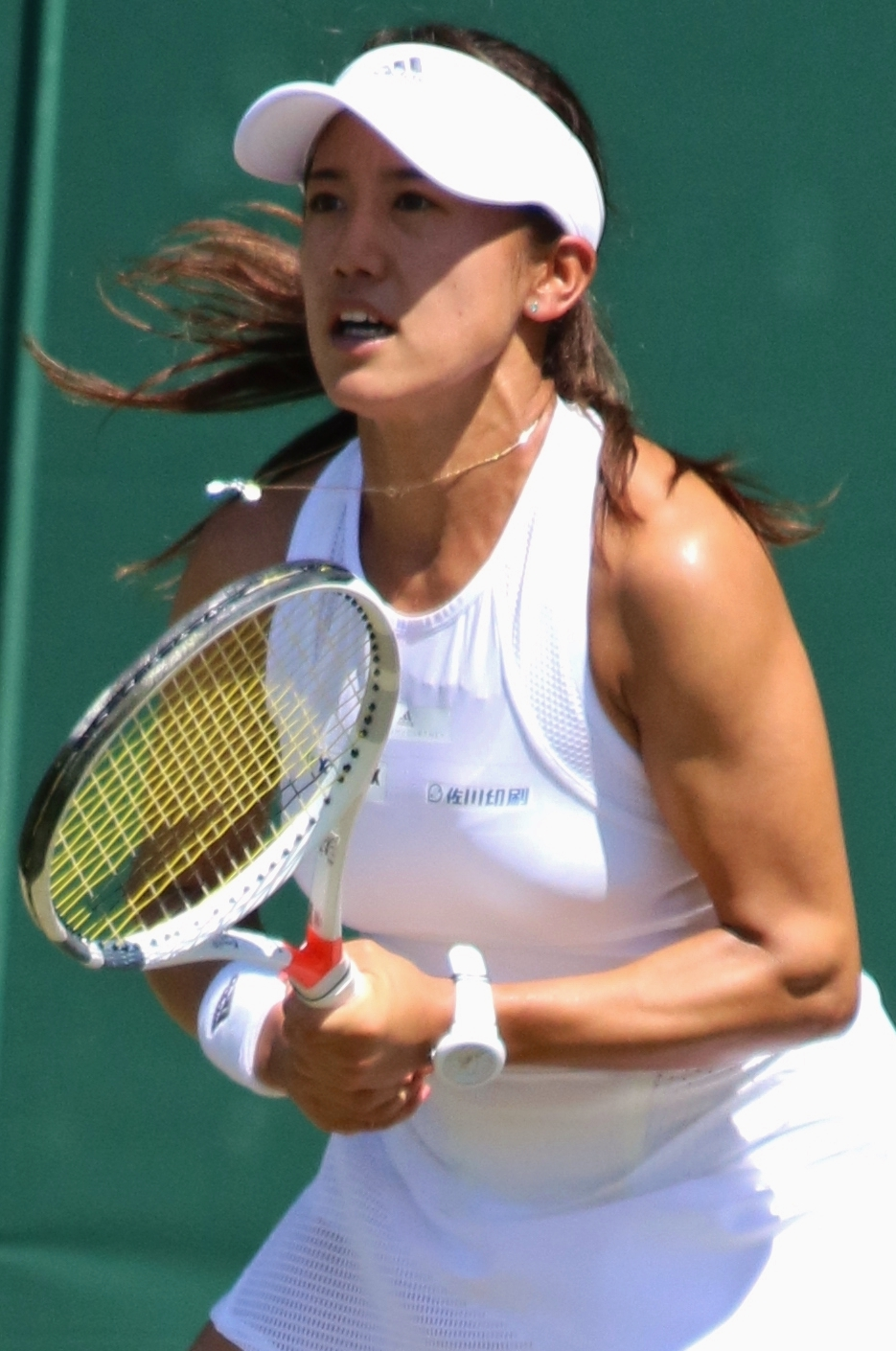
- Kato at the 2018 Wimbledon qualifying
- Native name: 加藤 未唯
- Country (sports): Japan
- Residence: Kyoto, Japan
- Born: 21 November 1994 (age 31) Kyoto, Japan
- Height: 1.56 m (5 ft 1 in)
- Turned pro: 2013
- Plays: Right (two-handed backhand)
- Coach: Ryuji Ohara
- Prize money: $2,277,461

Singles
- Career record: 216–177
- Career titles: 0 WTA, 4 ITF
- Highest ranking: No. 122 (15 January 2018)

Grand Slam singles results
- Australian Open: Q1 (2016)
- French Open: 1R (2017)
- Wimbledon: Q2 (2017)
- US Open: Q1 (2015)

Doubles
- Career record: 353–321
- Career titles: 7
- Highest ranking: No. 26 (1 January 2024)
- Current ranking: No. 46 (2 November 2026)

Grand Slam doubles results
- Australian Open: SF (2017)
- French Open: QF (2024)
- Wimbledon: 3R (2023)
- US Open: 3R (2016, 2023, 2026)

Mixed doubles
- Career titles: 1

Grand Slam mixed doubles results
- Australian Open: 1R (2024)
- French Open: W (2023)
- Wimbledon: 1R (2019, 2023, 2024)

Team competitions
- BJK Cup: 6–1
Medal record
Representing Japan
Women's tennis
Asian Games
Bronze medal – third place	2018 Jakarta	Doubles
- Last updated on: 4 November 2026.

Miyu Kato (Japanese: 加藤 未唯, romanized: Katō Miyu; born 21 November 1994) is a Japanese professional tennis player who specializes in doubles. She reached career-high WTA rankings of 26 in doubles on 1 January 2024 and No. 122 in singles in 2018. Kato has won six doubles titles on the WTA Tour and three at WTA 125-level. She has also won four singles and 13 doubles titles on the ITF World Tennis Tour. In mixed doubles, she won the 2023 French Open with Germany's Tim Pütz, her first Grand Slam title.

Three of Kato's six WTA Tour doubles titles were won with Indonesia's Aldila Sutjiadi: at Auckland and Cleveland in 2023, and Hua Hin in 2024. The pair also finished runners-up in the doubles event at the 2023 WTA Elite Trophy. In 2025, Kato reached the women's doubles finals at two WTA 1000 events: the 2025 Miami Open with Cristina Bucșa and the 2025 China Open with Fanny Stollár.

Representing Japan, she won the bronze medal in women's doubles at the 2018 Asian Games with Makoto Ninomiya and has represented her country in the Billie Jean King Cup.

== Career ==
=== 2023 : French Open Mixed doubles champion ===
Kato won her maiden major title in the mixed doubles at the 2023 French Open, together with her German partner Tim Pütz.

She reached a new career-high ranking of No. 27 on 23 October 2023, the week she was selected to participate in the 2023 WTA Elite Trophy with Aldila Sutjiadi.

==== French Open controversy ====
At the 2023 French Open, she and her partner Aldila Sutjiadi were defaulted in the women's doubles, after she accidentally hit a ball girl with a ball. She had to forfeit her points and prize money, although she made clear she would appeal the supervisor's decision. Kato received ample support from fellow players, including from the Professional Tennis Players Association, who deemed the disqualification unfair. Kato and Sutjiadi's opponents, Sara Sorribes Tormo and Marie Bouzková, were criticized for pushing the supervisor to disqualify Kato and laughing after the pair were disqualified, but did not apologize to Kato.

=== 2024-2025: WTA 1000 finals in Miami and Beijing ===
Kato and Sutjiadi won the doubles title at the 2024 Thailand Open, defeating Guo Hanyu and Jiang Xinyu in the final.

In March 2025, with new partner Cristina Bucșa, Kato reached the doubles final of the WTA 1000 Miami Open with an upset over the top seeds and world No. 1 and No. 2 players, Kateřina Siniaková and Taylor Townsend. They lost the championship match to Mirra Andreeva and Diana Shnaider.

Teaming up with Fanny Stollár, she reached another WTA 1000 final at the 2025 China Open, losing to second seeds Sara Errani and Jasmine Paolini in a champions tiebreak.

== Personal life and background ==
Kato has one brother named Yuki. She started playing tennis at the age of eight. She has stated that her tennis idols growing up were Justine Henin and Roger Federer. Her favorite surface is hardcourt, but her favorite tournament is Wimbledon.

== Performance timelines ==
Key
W	F	SF	QF	#R	RR	Q#	DNQ	A	NH

(W) winner; (F) finalist; (SF) semifinalist; (QF) quarterfinalist; (#R) rounds 4, 3, 2, 1; (RR) round-robin stage; (Q#) qualification round; (DNQ) did not qualify; (A) absent; (NH) not held; (SR) strike rate (events won / competed); (W–L) win–loss record.
To avoid confusion and double counting, these charts are updated at the conclusion of a tournament or when the player's participation has ended.

Only main-draw results in WTA Tour, Grand Slam tournaments, Billie Jean King Cup and Olympic Games are included in win–loss records and career statistics.

=== Doubles ===
Tournament	2016	2017	2018	2019	2020	2021	2022	2023	2024	2025	2026	SR	W–L	Win%
Grand Slam tournaments
Australian Open	A	SF	2R	1R	1R	A	1R	3R	1R	QF	3R	0 / 9	12–9	57%
French Open	1R	2R	1R	1R	2R	1R	2R	3R (Note: Kato was disqualified from the 2023 French Open, after accidentally hitting a ball girl when returning a ball to her.)	QF	1R	1R	0 / 11	8–11	42%
Wimbledon	2R	1R	1R	1R	NH	1R	1R	3R	2R	1R	2R	0 / 10	5–10	33%
US Open	3R	2R	1R	1R	A	2R	2R	3R	1R	2R	3R	0 / 10	10–10	50%
Win–Loss	3–3	6–4	1–4	0–4	1–2	1–3	2–4	8–4	4–4	4–4	5–4	0 / 40	35–40	47%
Year-end championships
WTA Elite Trophy	DNQ		RR	DNQ	NH			F	NH			0 / 2	2–3	40%
WTA 1000
Dubai / Qatar Open	A	A	QF	A	A	A	A	2R	2R	1R	1R	0 / 5	4–5	44%
Indian Wells Open	A	A	A	1R	NH	A	A	SF	2R	1R	1R	0 / 5	4–5	44%
Miami Open	A	A	A	1R	NH	A	A	1R	2R	F	2R	0 / 5	6–5	55%
Madrid Open	A	A	1R	A	NH	A	A	2R	2R	1R	A	0 / 4	2–4	33%
Italian Open	A	2R	1R	1R	A	A	A	QF	1R	1R	1R	0 / 7	3–7	30%
Canadian Open	A	1R	2R	2R	NH	A	A	2R	1R	A	2R	0 / 6	4–6	40%
Cincinnati Open	2R	A	A	A	A	A	A	QF	1R	1R	1R	0 / 5	3–5	38%
Guadalajara Open	NH						A	QF	A	A	A	0 / 1	2–1	67%
Wuhan Open	A	A	1R	A	NH				1R	A	1R	0 / 3	0–3	0%
China Open	A	A	1R	A	NH			1R	2R	F	1R	0 / 5	4–5	50%
Career statistics
Titles	1	0	1	0	0	0	0	2	1	0	0	Total: 5		
Finals	2	0	3	1	1	0	2	3	3	2	0	Total: 17		
Year-end ranking	58	40	45	79	74	80	49	27	37	45		$2,277,461		

=== Mixed doubles ===
Tournaments	2019	...	2023	2024	SR	W–L	Win%
Australian Open	A		A	1R	0 / 1	0–1	0%
French Open	A		W	QF	1 / 2	7–1	88%
Wimbledon	1R		1R	1R	0 / 3	0–3	0%
US Open	A		A	A	0 / 0	0–0	–
Win–Loss	0–1		5–1	2–3	1 / 6	7–5	58%

== Grand Slam tournament finals ==
=== Mixed doubles: 1 (title) ===
Result	Year	Tournament	Surface	Partner	Opponents	Score
Win	2023	French Open	Clay	(Germany) Tim Pütz	(Canada) Bianca Andreescu (New Zealand) Michael Venus	4–6, 6–4, [10–6]

== Other significant finals ==
=== WTA Elite Trophy ===
==== Doubles: 1 (runner-up) ====
Result	Year	Tournament	Surface	Partner	Opponents	Score
Loss	2023	Elite Trophy, Zhuhai	Hard	(Indonesia) Aldila Sutjiadi	(Brazil) Beatriz Haddad Maia; Veronika Kudermetova	3–6, 3–6

=== WTA 1000 tournaments ===
==== Doubles: 2 (runner-ups) ====
Result	Year	Tournament	Surface	Partner	Opponents	Score
Loss	2025	Miami Open	Hard	(Spain) Cristina Bucșa	Mirra Andreeva; Diana Shnaider	3–6, 7–6^{(7–5)}, [2–10]
Loss	2025	China Open	Hard	(Hungary) Fanny Stollár	(Italy) Sara Errani (Italy) Jasmine Paolini	7–6^{(7–1)}, 3–6, [2–10]

== WTA Tour finals ==
=== Singles: 1 (runner-up) ===
Legend WTA 250 (0–1)	Finals by surface Hard (0–1)

Result	W–L	Date	Tournament	Tier	Surface	Opponent	Score
Loss	0–1	Sep 2017	Japan Women's Open, Japan	International (Note: The WTA International tournaments were reclassified as WTA 250 tournaments in 2021.)	Hard	(Kazakhstan) Zarina Diyas	2–6, 5–7

=== Doubles: 19 (7 titles, 12 runner-ups) ===
Legend WTA 1000 (0–2) WTA 500 (1–1) Elite Trophy (0–1) WTA 250 (6–8)	Finals by surface Hard (7–10) Clay (0–1) Grass (0–1)

Result	W–L	Date	Tournament	Tier	Surface	Partner	Opponents	Score
Loss	0–1	Feb 2016	Taipei Open, Taiwan	International	Hard	(Japan) Eri Hozumi	(Chinese Taipei) Chan Hao-ching (Chinese Taipei) Chan Yung-jan	4–6, 3–6
Win	1–1	Apr 2016	Katowice Open, Poland	International	Hard (i)	(Japan) Eri Hozumi	(Russia) Valentyna Ivakhnenko (Russia) Marina Melnikova	3–6, 7–5, [10–8]
Loss	1–2	Jan 2018	Auckland Open, New Zealand	International	Hard	(Japan) Eri Hozumi	(Italy) Sara Errani (Netherlands) Bibiane Schoofs	5–7, 1–6
Loss	1–3	Sep 2018	Japan Women's Open, Japan	International	Hard	(Japan) Makoto Ninomiya	(Japan) Eri Hozumi (China) Zhang Shuai	2–6, 4–6
Win	2–3	Sep 2018	Pan Pacific Open, Japan	Premier (Note: The WTA Premier tournaments were reclassified as WTA 500 tournaments in 2021.)	Hard (i)	(Japan) Makoto Ninomiya	(Czech Republic) Andrea Sestini Hlaváčková (Czech Republic) Barbora Strýcová	6–4, 6–4
Loss	2–4	Oct 2019	Tianjin Open, China	International	Hard	(Japan) Nao Hibino	(Japan) Shuko Aoyama (Japan) Ena Shibahara	3–6, 5–7
Loss	2–5	Mar 2020	Monterrey Open, Mexico	International	Hard	(China) Wang Yafan	(Ukraine) Kateryna Bondarenko (Canada) Sharon Fichman	6–4, 3–6, [7–10]
Loss	2–6	Jul 2022	Hamburg European Open, Germany	WTA 250	Clay	(Indonesia) Aldila Sutjiadi	(United States) Sophie Chang (United States) Angela Kulikov	3–6, 6–4, [6–10]
Loss	2–7	Oct 2022	Jasmin Open, Tunisia	WTA 250	Hard	(United States) Angela Kulikov	(France) Kristina Mladenovic (Czech Republic) Kateřina Siniaková	2–6, 0–6
Win	3–7	Jan 2023	Auckland Classic, New Zealand	WTA 250	Hard	(Indonesia) Aldila Sutjiadi	(Canada) Leylah Fernandez (United States) Bethanie Mattek-Sands	1–6, 7–5, [10–4]
Win	4–7	Aug 2023	Tennis in Cleveland, US	WTA 250	Hard	(Indonesia) Aldila Sutjiadi	(United States) Nicole Melichar-Martinez (Australia) Ellen Perez	6–4, 6–7^{(4–7)}, [10–8]
Loss	4–8	Oct 2023	Zhuhai, China	Elite	Hard	(Indonesia) Aldila Sutjiadi	(Brazil) Beatriz Haddad Maia (Russia) Veronika Kudermetova	3–6, 3–6
Win	5–8	Feb 2024	Hua Hin Championships, Thailand	WTA 250	Hard	(Indonesia) Aldila Sutjiadi	(China) Guo Hanyu (China) Jiang Xinyu	6–4, 1–6, [10–7]
Loss	5–9	Jun 2024	Birmingham Classic, UK	WTA 250	Grass	(China) Zhang Shuai	(Chinese Taipei) Hsieh Su-wei (Belgium) Elise Mertens	1–6, 3–6
Loss	5–10	Sep 2024	Korea Open, South Korea	WTA 500	Hard	(China) Zhang Shuai	(United States) Nicole Melichar-Martinez (Russia) Liudmila Samsonova	1–6, 0–6
Loss	5–11	Mar 2025	Miami Open, US	WTA 1000	Hard	(Spain) Cristina Bucșa	(Russia) Mirra Andreeva (Russia) Diana Shnaider	3–6, 7–6^{(7–5)}, [2–10]
Loss	5–12	Oct 2025	China Open, China	WTA 1000	Hard	(Hungary) Fanny Stollár	(Italy) Sara Errani (Italy) Jasmine Paolini	7–6^{(7–1)}, 3–6, [2–10]
Win	6–12	Jul 2026	Athens Open, Greece	WTA 250	Hard	(Chinese Taipei) Chan Hao-ching	(United Kingdom) Maia Lumsden (China) Tang Qianhui	7–6^{(7–3)}, 4–6, [10–7]
Win	7–12	Nov 2026	Hong Kong Open, China	WTA 250	Hard	(Chinese Taipei) Chan Hao-ching	(Australia) Talia Gibson (Australia) Maddison Inglis	6–4, 6–4

== WTA 125 finals ==
=== Doubles: 4 (3 titles, 1 runner-up) ===
Result	W–L	Date	Tournament	Surface	Partner	Opponents	Score
Win	1–0	Nov 2016	Hawaii Open, United States	Hard	(Japan) Eri Hozumi	(United States) Nicole Gibbs (United States) Asia Muhammad	6–7^{(3–7)}, 6–3, [10–8]
Loss	1–1	May 2022	Clarins Open, France	Clay	(Georgia (country)) Oksana Kalashnikova	(Brazil) Beatriz Haddad Maia (France) Kristina Mladenovic	7–5, 4–6, [4–10]
Win	2–1	Aug 2022	Vancouver Open, Canada	Hard	(United States) Asia Muhammad	(Hungary) Tímea Babos (United States) Angela Kulikov	6–3, 7–5
Win	3–1	Mar 2026	Austin Challenger, United States	Hard	(Chinese Taipei) Chan Hao-ching	(Netherlands) Isabelle Haverlag (United States) Sabrina Santamaria	6–2, 6–3

== ITF Circuit finals ==
=== Singles: 8 (4 titles, 4 runner-ups) ===
Legend $60,000 tournaments (1–0) $25,000 tournaments (3–3) $10,000 tournaments (0–1)	Finals by surface Hard (2–3) Clay (1–0) Grass (1–1)

Result	W–L	Date	Tournament	Tier	Surface	Opponent	Score
Loss	0–1	Aug 2013	ITF Fort Worth, United States	10,000	Hard	(United States) Lauren Embree	6–3, 1–6, 1–3 ret.
Win	1–1	May 2015	ITF Karuizawa, Japan	25,000	Grass	(Japan) Makoto Ninomiya	7–6^{(5)}, 5–7, 6–1
Loss	1–2	May 2015	ITF Balikpapan, Indonesia	25,000	Hard	(China) Lu Jiajing	4–6, 4–6
Win	2–2	Jul 2015	ITF Bangkok, Thailand	25,000	Hard	(Uzbekistan) Nigina Abduraimova	7–5, 6–2
Loss	2–3	Oct 2015	ITF Hamamatsu, Japan	25,000	Grass	(Japan) Shuko Aoyama	2–6, 1–6
Win	3–3	Mar 2016	Clay Court International, Australia	25,000	Clay	(Hungary) Anna Bondár	6–4, 7–6^{(3)}
Loss	3–4	Nov 2022	Yokohama Challenger, Japan	W25	Hard	(South Korea) Han Na-lae	5–7, 0–6
Win	4–4	Dec 2022	Indoor Championships, Japan	W60	Hard (i)	(United Kingdom) Lily Miyazaki	6–4, 2–6, 6–2

=== Doubles: 26 (13 titles, 13 runner-ups) ===
Legend $100,000 tournaments (1–2) $75/80,000 tournaments (2–0) $50/60,000 tournaments (0–3) $25,000 tournaments (5–1) $10/15,000 tournaments (5–7)	Finals by surface Hard (7–6) Clay (2–6) Grass (2–0) Carpet (2–1)

Result	W–L	Date	Tournament	Tier	Surface	Partner	Opponents	Score
Win	1–0	Sep 2011	ITF Kyoto, Japan	10,000	Carpet (i)	(Japan) Riko Sawayanagi	(Japan) Kazusa Ito (Japan) Tomoko Taira	6–4, 7–6^{(5)}
Loss	1–1	Sep 2012	ITF Kyoto, Japan	10,000	Carpet (i)	(Japan) Misaki Mori	(Japan) Nao Hibino (Japan) Emi Mutaguchi	4–6, 3–6
Win	2–1	Oct 2012	ITF Makinohara, Japan	25,000	Grass	(Japan) Eri Hozumi	(Australia) Monique Adamczak (France) Caroline Garcia	7–6^{(6)}, 6–3
Loss	2–2	Jan 2013	ITF Hong Kong, China SAR	10,000	Hard	(Japan) Eri Hozumi	(China) Tian Ran (China) Tang Haochen	2–6, 1–6
Loss	2–3	Jan 2013	ITF Hong Kong, China SAR	10,000	Hard	(Japan) Eri Hozumi	(China) Xin Wen (China) Li Yihong	6–4, 1–6, [10–12]
Win	3–3	Sep 2013	ITF Kyoto, Japan	10,000	Carpet (i)	(Japan) Hiroko Kuwata	(Japan) Mana Ayukawa (Japan) Emi Mutaguchi	6–4, 6–2
Loss	3–4	Sep 2013	ITF Cairns, Australia	15,000	Hard	(Japan) Yurina Koshino	(Australia) Isabella Holland (Australia) Sally Peers	6–7^{(2)}, 6–4, [7–10]
Loss	3–5	Feb 2014	ITF Nonthaburi, Thailand	10,000	Hard	(Japan) Yuuki Tanaka	(Thailand) Nungnadda Wannasuk (Thailand) Varunya Wongteanchai	2–6, 2–6
Loss	3–6	Apr 2014	ITF Melbourne, Australia	15,000	Clay	(Japan) Yuuki Tanaka	(Australia) Jessica Moore (Bulgaria) Aleksandrina Naydenova	5–7, 7–6^{(5)}, [7–10]
Win	4–6	Jul 2014	ITF Bangkok, Thailand	10,000	Hard	(Japan) Akiko Omae	(Thailand) Kamonwan Buayam (Thailand) Nungnadda Wannasuk	6–0, 6–0
Loss	4–7	Aug 2014	ITF Wuhan, China	50,000	Hard	(Japan) Makoto Ninomiya	(China) Han Xinyun (China) Zhang Kailin	4–6, 2–6
Win	5–7	Apr 2015	ITF Bangkok, Thailand	15,000	Clay	(Japan) Nao Hibino	(Japan) Miyabi Inoue (Japan) Akiko Omae	6–4, 6–2
Win	6–7	May 2015	ITF Karuizawa, Japan	25,000	Grass	(Japan) Rika Fujiwara	(Japan) Mana Ayukawa (Japan) Makoto Ninomiya	6–2, 6–0
Win	7–7	Jun 2015	ITF Kashiwa, Japan	25,000	Hard	(Japan) Akiko Omae	(Japan) Mana Ayukawa (Japan) Makoto Ninomiya	6–2, 5–7, [10–8]
Win	8–7	Jun 2015	ITF Incheon, South Korea	25,000	Hard	(Japan) Kotomi Takahata	(South Korea) Choi Ji-hee (South Korea) Kim Na-ri	4–6, 6–3, [10–7]
Loss	8–8	Mar 2016	Clay Court International, Australia	25,000	Clay	(Japan) Eri Hozumi	(Australia) Ashleigh Barty (Australia) Arina Rodionova	7–5, 3–6, [7–10]
Win	9–8	May 2016	Kangaroo Cup Gifu, Japan	75,000+H	Hard	(Japan) Eri Hozumi	(Japan) Hiroko Kuwata (Japan) Ayaka Okuno	6–1, 6–2
Win	10–8	May 2017	Kangaroo Cup Gifu, Japan (2)	80,000	Hard	(Japan) Eri Hozumi	(United Kingdom) Katy Dunne (Israel) Julia Glushko	6–4, 6–2
Win	11–8	May 2017	ITF Rome, Italy	25,000	Clay	(Japan) Eri Hozumi	(Georgia (country)) Ekaterine Gorgodze (Norway) Melanie Stokke	6–1, 6–4
Loss	11–9	Oct 2017	Suzhou Ladies Open, China	60,000	Hard	(Japan) Eri Hozumi	(United States) Jacqueline Cako (Serbia) Nina Stojanović	6–2, 5–7, [2–10]
Loss	11–10	Mar 2018	Clay Court International, Australia	60,000	Clay	(Japan) Makoto Ninomiya	(Australia) Priscilla Hon (Slovenia) Dalila Jakupović	4–6, 6–4, [7–10]
Win	12–10	Aug 2019	Vancouver Open, Canada	W100	Hard	(Japan) Nao Hibino	(United Kingdom) Naomi Broady (New Zealand) Erin Routliffe	6–2, 6–2
Loss	12–11	Jan 2021	ITF Antalya, Turkey	W15	Clay	(Japan) Haine Ogata	(Argentina) Victoria Bosio (Brazil) Gabriela Cé	4–6, 3–6
Loss	12–12	May 2021	ITF Charleston Pro, US	W100	Clay	(Japan) Eri Hozumi	(United States) Caty McNally (Australia) Storm Sanders	5–7, 6–4, [6–10]
Loss	12–13	May 2021	Bonita Springs Championship, US	W100	Clay	(Japan) Eri Hozumi	(New Zealand) Erin Routliffe (Indonesia) Aldila Sutjiadi	3–6, 6–4, [6–10]
Win	13–13	Feb 2022	ITF Monastir, Tunisia	W15	Hard	(Japan) Kisa Yoshioka	(Belarus) Kristina Dmitruk (Algeria) Inès Ibbou	6–4, 7–5

== Junior Grand Slam tournament final ==
=== Girls' doubles: 1 (runner-up) ===
Result	Year	Tournament	Surface	Partner	Opponents	Score
Loss	2011	Australian Open	Hard	(Japan) Eri Hozumi	(Netherlands) Demi Schuurs (Belgium) An-Sophie Mestach	2–6, 3–6
