= Kangaroo Cup =

- 2026 Kangaroo Cup

ITF Women's Tour
- Event name: Kangaroo Cup International Ladies Open Tennis
- Location: Gifu, Japan
- Venue: Nagaragawa Tennis Plaza, Gifu Memorial Center
- Category: ITF Women's Circuit
- Surface: Hard
- Draw: 32S/32Q/16D
- Prize money: $100,000

The Kangaroo Cup is a tournament for professional female tennis players played on outdoor hard courts. The event is classified as a $100,000 ITF Women's Circuit tournament and has been held in Gifu, Japan, since 1997.

== Past finals ==
=== Singles ===
Year	Champion	Runner-up	Score
2026	(Thailand) Mananchaya Sawangkaew	(Australia) Emerson Jones	7–6^{(7–2)}, 6–3
2025	(China) Zhang Shuai	(Thailand) Mananchaya Sawangkaew	6–3, 6–4
2024	(Japan) Moyuka Uchijima	(Australia) Arina Rodionova	6–3, 6–3
2023	(Japan) Himeno Sakatsume	(United Kingdom) Katie Boulter	7–5, 6–3
2020–22	Tournament cancelled due to the COVID-19 pandemic		
2019	(Kazakhstan) Zarina Diyas	(Chinese Taipei) Liang En-shuo	6–0, 6–2
2018	(Japan) Kurumi Nara	(Japan) Moyuka Uchijima	6–2, 7–6^{(7–4)}
2017	(Slovakia) Magdaléna Rybáriková	(China) Zhu Lin	6–2, 6–3
2016	(Japan) Hiroko Kuwata	(China) Wang Qiang	6–2, 2–6, 6–4
2015	(China) Zheng Saisai	(Japan) Naomi Osaka	3–6, 7–5, 6–4
2014	(Hungary) Tímea Babos	(Russia) Ekaterina Bychkova	6–1, 6–2
2013	(Belgium) An-Sophie Mestach	(China) Wang Qiang	1–6, 6–3, 6–0
2012	(Japan) Kimiko Date-Krumm	(Thailand) Noppawan Lertcheewakarn	6–1, 5–7, 6–3
2011	(Japan) Sachie Ishizu	(United Kingdom) Emily Webley-Smith	6–1, 6–3
2010	(Czech Republic) Karolína Plíšková	(China) Sun Shengnan	6–3, 3–6, 6–3
2009	(Japan) Aiko Nakamura	(Japan) Tomoko Yonemura	6–1, 6–4
2008	(Thailand) Tamarine Tanasugarn	(Japan) Kimiko Date-Krumm	4–6, 7–5, 6–2
2007	(Chinese Taipei) Chan Yung-jan	(Japan) Ayumi Morita	6–3, 6–1
2006	(Japan) Erika Takao	(Japan) Aiko Nakamura	6–1, 5–7, 6–1
2005	(Japan) Saori Obata	(Japan) Shiho Hisamatsu	6–1, 2–6, 6–4
2004	(Serbia and Montenegro) Ana Ivanovic	(South Korea) Jeon Mi-ra	6–4, 2–6, 7–5
2003	(Japan) Shinobu Asagoe	(Japan) Saori Obata	6–4, 6–1
2002	(United Kingdom) Julie Pullin	(Japan) Shinobu Asagoe	4–6, 6–4, 6–3
2001	(Australia) Alicia Molik	(Australia) Bryanne Stewart	6–2, 6–3
2000	(Thailand) Tamarine Tanasugarn	(Japan) Shinobu Asagoe	7–5, 6–4
1999	(Chinese Taipei) Wang Shi-ting	(South Korea) Park Sung-hee	6–7, 7–5, 6–2
1998	(Japan) Misumi Miyauchi	(South Korea) Park Sung-hee	6–3, 6–4
1997	(Australia) Kerry-Anne Guse	(South Korea) Jeon Mi-ra	7–5, 7–5

=== Doubles ===
Year	Champions	Runners-up	Score
2026	(United Kingdom) Harriet Dart (United Kingdom) Heather Watson	(United States) Catherine Harrison (United States) Dalayna Hewitt	3–6, 6–3, [10–4]
2025	(Japan) Momoko Kobori (Japan) Ayano Shimizu	(United States) Emina Bektas (United Kingdom) Lily Miyazaki	6–1, 6–2
2024	(Chinese Taipei) Liang En-shuo (China) Tang Qianhui	(Australia) Kimberly Birrell (Canada) Rebecca Marino	6–0, 6–3
2023	(South Korea) Han Na-lae (South Korea) Jang Su-jeong	(Chinese Taipei) Lee Ya-hsuan (Chinese Taipei) Wu Fang-hsien	7–6^{(7–3)}, 2–6, [10–8]
2020–22	Tournament cancelled due to the COVID-19 pandemic		
2019	(China) Duan Yingying (China) Han Xinyun	(Japan) Akiko Omae (Thailand) Peangtarn Plipuech	6–3, 4–6, [10–4]
2018	(Japan) Rika Fujiwara (Japan) Yuki Naito	(Russia) Ksenia Lykina (United Kingdom) Emily Webley-Smith	7–5, 6–4
2017	(Japan) Eri Hozumi (Japan) Miyu Kato	(United Kingdom) Katy Dunne (Israel) Julia Glushko	6–4, 6–2
2016	(Japan) Eri Hozumi (Japan) Miyu Kato	(Japan) Hiroko Kuwata (Japan) Ayaka Okuno	6–1, 6–2
2015	(China) Wang Yafan (China) Xu Yifan	(Belgium) An-Sophie Mestach (United Kingdom) Emily Webley-Smith	6–2, 6–3
2014	(Australia) Jarmila Gajdošová (Australia) Arina Rodionova	(Japan) Misaki Doi (Chinese Taipei) Hsieh Shu-ying	6–3, 6–3
2013	(Thailand) Luksika Kumkhum (Japan) Erika Sema	(Japan) Nao Hibino (Japan) Riko Sawayanagi	6–4, 6–3
2012	(United States) Jessica Pegula (China) Zheng Saisai	(Chinese Taipei) Chan Chin-wei (Chinese Taipei) Hsu Wen-hsin	6–4, 3–6, [10–4]
2011	(Chinese Taipei) Chan Hao-ching (Chinese Taipei) Chan Yung-jan	(Thailand) Noppawan Lertcheewakarn (Japan) Erika Sema	6–2, 6–3
2010	(Japan) Erika Sema (Japan) Tomoko Yonemura	(Russia) Ksenia Lykina (United Kingdom) Melanie South	6–3, 2–6, [10–7]
2009	(Australia) Sophie Ferguson (Japan) Aiko Nakamura	(Japan) Misaki Doi (Japan) Kurumi Nara	6–2, 6–1
2008	(Japan) Kimiko Date-Krumm (Japan) Kurumi Nara	(United Kingdom) Melanie South (Netherlands) Nicole Thijssen	6–1, 6–7^{(8–10)}, [10–7]
2007	(Japan) Ayumi Morita (Japan) Ai Sugiyama	(Japan) Kumiko Iijima (Japan) Seiko Okamoto	6–1, 3–6, 6–0
2006	(Chinese Taipei) Chan Chin-wei (Chinese Taipei) Hsieh Su-wei	(Chinese Taipei) Chan Yung-jan (Chinese Taipei) Chuang Chia-jung	7–6^{(7–5)}, 3–6, 7–5
2005	(Japan) Rika Fujiwara (Japan) Saori Obata	(Japan) Ryōko Fuda (Japan) Seiko Okamoto	6–1, 6–2
2004	(South Korea) Cho Yoon-jeong (South Korea) Jeon Mi-ra	(Chinese Taipei) Chuang Chia-jung (Indonesia) Wynne Prakusya	7–6^{(7–4)}, 6–2
2003	(Japan) Rika Fujiwara (Japan) Saori Obata	(Japan) Shinobu Asagoe (Japan) Nana Miyagi	1–6, 7–5, 6–3
2002	(South Korea) Cho Yoon-jeong (Australia) Evie Dominikovic	(Japan) Shinobu Asagoe (Japan) Rika Fujiwara	6–2, 6–2
2001	(South Korea) Kim Eun-ha (Indonesia) Wynne Prakusya	(United Kingdom) Julie Pullin (United Kingdom) Lorna Woodroffe	1–6, 6–4, 7–6^{(7–2)}
2000	(Japan) Shinobu Asagoe (Japan) Yuka Yoshida	(South Africa) Surina De Beer (South Africa) Esmé de Villiers	6–3, 6–1
1999	(South Korea) Chae Kyung-yee (South Korea) Cho Yoon-jeong	(Japan) Shiho Hisamatsu (Japan) Nana Miyagi	6–2, 4–6, 6–2
1998	(Australia) Catherine Barclay (Australia) Kerry-Anne Guse	(South Korea) Cho Yoon-jeong (South Korea) Park Sung-hee	7–6, 6–4
1997	(Japan) Saori Obata (Japan) Kaoru Shibata	(Japan) Shinobu Asagoe (Japan) Yasuko Nishimata	6–3, 7–5
