= 2005 Australian Open – Women's singles qualifying =

Women's singles qualifying
- 2005 Australian Open

Events
Singles	men	women		boys	girls
Doubles	men	women	mixed	boys	girls
WC Singles	men	women	quad
WC Doubles	men	women	quad
Legends	men	women	mixed

Qualification
Singles	men	women
- Australian Open

This article displays the qualifying draw for the Women's singles at the 2005 Australian Open.

== Seeds ==
1. (Bulgaria) Sesil Karatantcheva (qualified)
2. (Italy) Roberta Vinci (first round)
3. (United States) Lilia Osterloh (second round)
4. (Switzerland) Marie-Gaïané Mikaelian (first round)
5. (Belgium) Els Callens (first round)
6. (United States) Angela Haynes (qualified)
7. (Czech Republic) Zuzana Ondrášková (qualified)
8. (United States) Kelly McCain (first round)
9. (Russia) Lina Krasnoroutskaya (qualifying competition)
10. (Venezuela) Milagros Sequera (second round)
11. (China) Sun Tiantian (second round)
12. (Japan) Aiko Nakamura (qualified)
13. (United States) Jennifer Hopkins (qualifying competition)
14. (Russia) Galina Voskoboeva (qualifying competition)
15. (Spain) Laura Pous Tió (first round)
16. (Belarus) Anastasiya Yakimova (qualified)
17. (Canada) Marie-Ève Pelletier (qualifying competition)
18. (Czech Republic) Sandra Kleinová (first round)
19. (Israel) Shahar Pe'er (qualifying competition)
20. (Czech Republic) Lenka Němečková (qualifying competition)
21. (Puerto Rico) Vilmarie Castellvi (second round)
22. (Zimbabwe) Cara Black (first round)
23. (Russia) Lioudmila Skavronskaia (first round)
24. (Spain) Conchita Martínez Granados (second round)

== Qualifiers ==
1. (Bulgaria) Sesil Karatantcheva
2. (United States) Jessica Kirkland
3. (Netherlands) Michaëlla Krajicek
4. (China) Liu Nannan
5. (United Kingdom) Elena Baltacha
6. (United States) Angela Haynes
7. (Czech Republic) Zuzana Ondrášková
8. (Hungary) Zsófia Gubacsi
9. (Belarus) Anastasiya Yakimova
10. (China) Li Ting
11. (United States) Meilen Tu
12. (Japan) Aiko Nakamura

== Qualifying draw ==
Key

- Q = Qualifier
- WC = Wild card
- LL = Lucky loser
- Alt = Alternate
- ITF = ITF entry
- PR = Protected ranking
- SR = Special ranking
- SE = Special exempt
- JE = Junior exempt
- JR = Junior Accelerator Programme entrant
- CO = College Accelerator Programme entrant
- NG = Next Gen Accelerator Program entrant
- w/o = Walkover
- r = Retired
- d = Defaulted

=== First qualifier ===
First round
1	(Bulgaria) Sesil Karatantcheva	6	7^{7}
(South Africa) Chanelle Scheepers	2	6^{2}
(Brazil) Maria Fernanda Alves	6	7
(Russia) Nina Bratchikova	0	5
WC	(Australia) Daniella Dominikovic	4	6	6
WC	(Australia) Adriana Szili	6	1	4
(Czech Republic) Libuše Průšová	1	0
19	(Israel) Shahar Pe'er	6	6

Second round
1	(Bulgaria) Sesil Karatantcheva	6	6
(Brazil) Maria Fernanda Alves	3	3
WC	(Australia) Daniella Dominikovic	4	1
19	(Israel) Shahar Pe'er	6	6

Qualifying competition
1	(Bulgaria) Sesil Karatantcheva	6	7
19	(Israel) Shahar Pe'er	4	5

=== Second qualifier ===
First round
2	(Italy) Roberta Vinci	1	2
(South Korea) Cho Yoon-jeong	6	6
(Portugal) Frederica Piedade	3	2
(Czech Republic) Eva Hrdinová	6	6
WC	(Australia) Lauren Breadmore	6^{5}	2
(United States) Jessica Kirkland	7^{7}	6
(Croatia) Ivana Abramović	6	1	1
24	(Spain) Conchita Martínez Granados	4	6	6

Second round
(South Korea) Cho Yoon-jeong	7	6^{5}	6
(Czech Republic) Eva Hrdinová	5	7^{7}	1
(United States) Jessica Kirkland	7	6
24	(Spain) Conchita Martínez Granados	5	2

Qualifying competition
(South Korea) Cho Yoon-jeong	2	4
(United States) Jessica Kirkland	6	6

=== Third qualifier ===
First round
3	(United States) Lilia Osterloh	6	6
(Thailand) Suchanun Viratprasert	4	4
WC	(Netherlands) Michaëlla Krajicek	6	6
(Canada) Stéphanie Dubois	4	3
(Chinese Taipei) Chuang Chia-jung	6^{5}	6	11
(Italy) Nathalie Viérin	7^{7}	4	9
(Switzerland) Timea Bacsinszky	1	1
14	(Russia) Galina Voskoboeva	6	6

Second round
3	(United States) Lilia Osterloh	4	2
WC	(Netherlands) Michaëlla Krajicek	6	6
(Chinese Taipei) Chuang Chia-jung	3	0
14	(Russia) Galina Voskoboeva	6	6

Qualifying competition
WC	(Netherlands) Michaëlla Krajicek	7^{7}	5	6
14	(Russia) Galina Voskoboeva	6^{4}	7	0

=== Fourth qualifier ===
First round
4	(Switzerland) Marie-Gaïané Mikaelian	3	6	3
(Germany) Vanessa Henke	6	1	6
(United Kingdom) Amanda Janes	2	0
(China) Liu Nannan	6	6
(Slovakia) Eva Fislová	0	4
(Japan) Yuka Yoshida	6	6
(Czech Republic) Kateřina Böhmová	6	6
22	(Zimbabwe) Cara Black	2	3

Second round
(Germany) Vanessa Henke	1	2
(China) Liu Nannan	6	6
(Japan) Yuka Yoshida	7	6
(Czech Republic) Kateřina Böhmová	5	2

Qualifying competition
(China) Liu Nannan	6	6
(Japan) Yuka Yoshida	4	3

=== Fifth qualifier ===
First round
5	(Belgium) Els Callens	5	0
(United Kingdom) Elena Baltacha	7	6
(Slovakia) Dominika Nociarová	5	7	2
WC	(Australia) Jaslyn Hewitt	7	5	6
(United States) Teryn Ashley	6	4	6
(Canada) Maureen Drake	0	6	3
(India) Shikha Uberoi	6	6
23	(Russia) Lioudmila Skavronskaia	1	4

Second round
(United Kingdom) Elena Baltacha	6	6
WC	(Australia) Jaslyn Hewitt	2	0
(United States) Teryn Ashley	6	6
(India) Shikha Uberoi	3	3

Qualifying competition
(United Kingdom) Elena Baltacha	6	6
(United States) Teryn Ashley	3	3

=== Sixth qualifier ===
First round
6	(United States) Angela Haynes	6	1	6
(Czech Republic) Eva Birnerová	1	6	1
(Slovakia) Stanislava Hrozenská	5	0
(United States) Jamea Jackson	7	6
(South Africa) Natalie Grandin	4	7^{10}	6
(Czech Republic) Lucie Šafářová	6	6^{8}	0
(Netherlands) Elise Tamaëla	6	6
18	(Czech Republic) Sandra Kleinová	3	0

Second round
6	(United States) Angela Haynes	6	6
(United States) Jamea Jackson	1	4
(South Africa) Natalie Grandin	5	1
(Netherlands) Elise Tamaëla	7	6

Qualifying competition
6	(United States) Angela Haynes	6	6
(Netherlands) Elise Tamaëla	4	3

=== Seventh qualifier ===
First round
7	(Czech Republic) Zuzana Ondrášková	6	6^{3}	6
(Sweden) Sofia Arvidsson	4	7^{7}	4
(Germany) Adriana Barna	6	5	1
(Croatia) Lana Popadić	3	7	6
(Japan) Shiho Hisamatsu	3	2
(Ukraine) Yuliya Beygelzimer	6	6
(France) Virginie Pichet	4	0
17	(Canada) Marie-Ève Pelletier	6	6

Second round
7	(Czech Republic) Zuzana Ondrášková	6	6
(Croatia) Lana Popadić	3	2
(Ukraine) Yuliya Beygelzimer	4	3
17	(Canada) Marie-Ève Pelletier	6	6

Qualifying competition
7	(Czech Republic) Zuzana Ondrášková	2	6	6
17	(Canada) Marie-Ève Pelletier	6	2	2

=== Eighth qualifier ===
First round
8	(United States) Kelly McCain	4	7	1
(Estonia) Maret Ani	6	5	6
WC	(Australia) Dubravka Cupac	1	2
(Hungary) Zsófia Gubacsi	6	6
WC	(Australia) Olivia Lukaszewicz	6	2	6
(Slovakia) Jarmila Gajdošová	1	6	4
(Germany) Angelika Bachmann	3	0
13	(United States) Jennifer Hopkins	6	6

Second round
(Estonia) Maret Ani	6	2	4
(Hungary) Zsófia Gubacsi	3	6	6
WC	(Australia) Olivia Lukaszewicz	1	1
13	(United States) Jennifer Hopkins	6	6

Qualifying competition
(Hungary) Zsófia Gubacsi	6	6^{7}	6
13	(United States) Jennifer Hopkins	1	7^{9}	1

=== Ninth qualifier ===
First round
9	(Russia) Lina Krasnoroutskaya	6	6
(Japan) Rika Fujiwara	4	2
WC	(Australia) Shayna McDowell	4	2
(Spain) Lourdes Domínguez Lino	6	6
(Belarus) Tatiana Poutchek	2	1
(Germany) Martina Müller	6	6
(Spain) Paula García	2	3
16	(Belarus) Anastasiya Yakimova	6	6

Second round
9	(Russia) Lina Krasnoroutskaya	6	6
(Spain) Lourdes Domínguez Lino	3	2
(Germany) Martina Müller	6	2	2
16	(Belarus) Anastasiya Yakimova	4	6	6

Qualifying competition
9	(Russia) Lina Krasnoroutskaya	4	1
16	(Belarus) Anastasiya Yakimova	6	6

=== Tenth qualifier ===
First round
10	(Venezuela) Milagros Sequera	6	6
(Czech Republic) Hana Šromová	3	3
(Germany) Kathrin Wörle	2	2
(Germany) Sandra Klösel	6	6
(Ukraine) Olga Lazarchuk	5	5
(Romania) Edina Gallovits	7	7
(China) Li Ting	6	4	6
15	(Spain) Laura Pous Tió	2	6	2

Second round
10	(Venezuela) Milagros Sequera	3	2
(Germany) Sandra Klösel	6	6
(Romania) Edina Gallovits	4	2
(China) Li Ting	6	6

Qualifying competition
(Germany) Sandra Klösel	7^{7}	3	1
(China) Li Ting	6^{5}	6	6

=== Eleventh qualifier ===
First round
11	(China) Sun Tiantian	6	4	6
(Slovakia) Zuzana Kučová	0	6	2
(United States) Sunitha Rao	3	6	6
(Germany) Stephanie Gehrlein	6	2	2
(Slovakia) Janette Husárová	7	3	2
(United States) Meilen Tu	5	6	6
(Romania) Delia Sescioreanu	4	4
21	(Puerto Rico) Vilmarie Castellvi	6	6

Second round
11	(China) Sun Tiantian	3	2
(United States) Sunitha Rao	6	6
(United States) Meilen Tu	7	6
21	(Puerto Rico) Vilmarie Castellvi	5	4

Qualifying competition
(United States) Sunitha Rao	2	3
(United States) Meilen Tu	6	6

=== Twelfth qualifier ===
First round
12	(Japan) Aiko Nakamura	6	6
(Sweden) Hanna Nooni	3	2
(Russia) Ekaterina Bychkova	6	7^{7}
(Austria) Yvonne Meusburger	3	6^{3}
(Austria) Sybille Bammer	6	6
(Russia) Anastasia Rodionova	4	4
(Finland) Emma Laine	2	2
20	(Czech Republic) Lenka Němečková	6	6

Second round
12	(Japan) Aiko Nakamura	6	6
(Russia) Ekaterina Bychkova	3	4
(Austria) Sybille Bammer	0	0
20	(Czech Republic) Lenka Němečková	6	6

Qualifying competition
12	(Japan) Aiko Nakamura	7^{7}	7^{7}
20	(Czech Republic) Lenka Němečková	6^{3}	6^{5}
