= 2005 Australian Open – Men's singles qualifying =

Men's singles qualifying
- 2005 Australian Open

Events
Singles	men	women		boys	girls
Doubles	men	women	mixed	boys	girls
WC Singles	men	women	quad
WC Doubles	men	women	quad
Legends	men	women	mixed

Qualification
Singles	men	women
- Australian Open

This article displays the qualifying draw for the Men's singles at the 2005 Australian Open tennis tournament.

En route to qualifying for the main draw, Novak Djokovic defeated Stan Wawrinka in the second round; the pair would eventually face off in the main draw in three consecutive years between 2013–15, with each of their three matches going to five sets. The winner of their 2013-2015 matches went on to win the tournament each time.

== Seeds ==
1. (Czech Republic) Tomáš Zíb (qualified)
2. (Belgium) Kristof Vliegen (first round)
3. (Spain) Guillermo García-López (qualified)
4. (Belgium) Christophe Rochus (qualifying competition, lucky loser)
5. (France) Olivier Patience (qualified)
6. (Czech Republic) Jiří Vaněk (first round)
7. (Serbia and Montenegro) Janko Tipsarević (qualified)
8. (Germany) Björn Phau (qualifying competition, lucky loser)
9. (United States) Alex Bogomolov Jr. (first round)
10. (Switzerland) Ivo Heuberger (first round)
11. (Switzerland) Marco Chiudinelli (first round)
12. (France) Nicolas Mahut (first round)
13. (Ecuador) Giovanni Lapentti (withdrew)
14. (Germany) Alexander Waske (second round)
15. (South Africa) Wesley Moodie (qualifying competition)
16. (Spain) Marc López (second round)
17. (Italy) Francesco Aldi (second round)
18. (France) Jean-René Lisnard (qualified)
19. (France) Gilles Simon (qualifying competition)
20. (France) Thierry Ascione (first round)
21. (Israel) Noam Okun (second round)
22. (United States) Jeff Salzenstein (second round)
23. (Italy) Andreas Seppi (second round)
24. (Italy) Daniele Bracciali (qualified)
25. (Croatia) Roko Karanušić (qualified)
26. (United States) Glenn Weiner (first round)
27. (Cyprus) Marcos Baghdatis (qualified)
28. (France) Julien Jeanpierre (first round)
29. (Russia) Igor Kunitsyn (first round)
30. (Italy) Tomas Tenconi (second round)
31. (United States) Amer Delić (second round)
32. (Switzerland) Stanislas Wawrinka (second round)

== Qualifiers ==
1. (Czech Republic) Tomáš Zíb
2. (Italy) Federico Luzzi
3. (Spain) Guillermo García-López
4. (Austria) Oliver Marach
5. (France) Olivier Patience
6. (France) Florent Serra
7. (Serbia and Montenegro) Janko Tipsarević
8. (France) Jean-René Lisnard
9. (Cyprus) Marcos Baghdatis
10. (Germany) Dieter Kindlmann
11. (Netherlands) Melle van Gemerden
12. (Italy) Daniele Bracciali
13. (United States) Bobby Reynolds
14. (Croatia) Roko Karanušić
15. (Serbia and Montenegro) Novak Djokovic
16. (Japan) Takao Suzuki

== Lucky losers ==
1. (Belgium) Christophe Rochus
2. (Germany) Björn Phau

== Qualifying draw ==
Key

- Q = Qualifier
- WC = Wild card
- LL = Lucky loser
- Alt = Alternate
- ITF = ITF entry
- PR = Protected ranking
- SR = Special ranking
- SE = Special exempt
- JE = Junior exempt
- JR = Junior Accelerator Programme entrant
- CO = College Accelerator Programme entrant
- NG = Next Gen Accelerator Program entrant
- w/o = Walkover
- r = Retired
- d = Defaulted

=== First qualifier ===
First round
1	(Czech Republic) Tomáš Zíb	6	6
(Australia) Adam Feeney	2	2
WC	(Australia) Andrew Derer	0^{r}
(Australia) Jaymon Crabb	1
WC	(United States) Robert Yim	3	6	5
(Australia) Robert Smeets	6	3	7
(South Africa) Rik de Voest	4	3
31	(United States) Amer Delić	6	6

Second round
1	(Czech Republic) Tomáš Zíb	6	6
(Australia) Jaymon Crabb	2	4
(Australia) Robert Smeets	6	7
31	(United States) Amer Delić	3	5

Qualifying competition
1	(Czech Republic) Tomáš Zíb	6	6
(Australia) Robert Smeets	1	4

=== Second qualifier ===
First round
2	(Belgium) Kristof Vliegen	3	6	5
(Australia) Shannon Nettle	6	2	7
(Greece) Vasilis Mazarakis	6	6
(Czech Republic) František Čermák	2	1
(Czech Republic) Jan Mertl	6^{4}	3
(Italy) Federico Luzzi	7^{7}	6
(Greece) Konstantinos Economidis	6	6
28	(France) Julien Jeanpierre	4	4

Second round
(Australia) Shannon Nettle	6	2	6
(Greece) Vasilis Mazarakis	1	6	4
(Italy) Federico Luzzi	6	6
(Greece) Konstantinos Economidis	3	3

Qualifying competition
(Australia) Shannon Nettle	2	5
(Italy) Federico Luzzi	6	7

=== Third qualifier ===
First round
3	(Spain) Guillermo García-López	6^{5}	7^{7}	6
(Czech Republic) Tomáš Cakl	7^{7}	6^{4}	1
(Argentina) Nicolás Todero	7	6
(United Kingdom) Jonathan Marray	5	3
WC	(Australia) Raphael Durek	3	4
(France) Jean-François Bachelot	6	6
(Italy) Giorgio Galimberti	6^{5}	7^{7}	3
22	(United States) Jeff Salzenstein	7^{7}	6^{3}	6

Second round
3	(Spain) Guillermo García-López	2	6	6
(Argentina) Nicolás Todero	6	4	3
(France) Jean-François Bachelot	7	6
22	(United States) Jeff Salzenstein	5	4

Qualifying competition
3	(Spain) Guillermo García-López	6	6
(France) Jean-François Bachelot	1	3

=== Fourth qualifier ===
First round
4	(Belgium) Christophe Rochus	7^{7}	4	6
(Austria) Zbynek Mlynarik	6^{4}	6	2
(Austria) Julian Knowle	6	6
(Poland) Łukasz Kubot	1	4
(Austria) Oliver Marach	7	5	6
(United Kingdom) Alan Mackin	5	7	3
(France) Stéphane Robert	4	2
23	(Italy) Andreas Seppi	6	6

Second round
4	(Belgium) Christophe Rochus	6	6
(Austria) Julian Knowle	1	4
(Austria) Oliver Marach	6	6
23	(Italy) Andreas Seppi	3	1

Qualifying competition
4	(Belgium) Christophe Rochus	3	7^{7}	3
(Austria) Oliver Marach	6	6^{4}	6

=== Fifth qualifier ===
First round
5	(France) Olivier Patience	4	6	6
WC	(Australia) Rameez Junaid	6	3	3
(United States) Cecil Mamiit	1	3
(France) Édouard Roger-Vasselin	6	6
(Czech Republic) Pavel Šnobel	7^{7}	6
WC	(Australia) Todd Ley	6^{2}	4
(Pakistan) Aisam-ul-Haq Qureshi	1	4
30	(Italy) Tomas Tenconi	6	6

Second round
5	(France) Olivier Patience	7^{7}	7
(France) Édouard Roger-Vasselin	6^{5}	5
(Czech Republic) Pavel Šnobel	6	6
30	(Italy) Tomas Tenconi	1	3

Qualifying competition
5	(France) Olivier Patience	6	7^{8}
(Czech Republic) Pavel Šnobel	3	6^{6}

=== Sixth qualifier ===
First round
6	(Czech Republic) Jiří Vaněk	5	1
(France) Florent Serra	7	6
(France) Nicolas Devilder	6^{9}	6	6
(United States) Brian Baker	7^{11}	4	2
(Austria) Daniel Köllerer	6	6
(Germany) Frank Moser	4	3
(United Kingdom) Arvind Parmar	6	6
26	(United States) Glenn Weiner	4	0

Second round
(France) Florent Serra	6	6
(France) Nicolas Devilder	4	3
(Austria) Daniel Köllerer	4	7^{7}	8
(United Kingdom) Arvind Parmar	6	6^{2}	6

Qualifying competition
(France) Florent Serra	6	6
(Austria) Daniel Köllerer	4	0

=== Seventh qualifier ===
First round
7	(Serbia and Montenegro) Janko Tipsarević	7^{7}	6^{4}	7
(Austria) Rainer Eitzinger	6^{4}	7^{7}	5
(Germany) Sebastian Fitz	6	6
(Australia) Sadik Kadir	3	4
(France) Sébastien de Chaunac	7^{7}	3	8
(Czech Republic) Jan Minář	6^{5}	6	6
(Slovakia) Michal Mertiňák	3	7	4
21	(Israel) Noam Okun	6	5	6

Second round
7	(Serbia and Montenegro) Janko Tipsarević	6^{5}	6	6
(Germany) Sebastian Fitz	7^{7}	2	3
(France) Sébastien de Chaunac	6	0	6
21	(Israel) Noam Okun	3	6	1

Qualifying competition
7	(Serbia and Montenegro) Janko Tipsarević	6	6
(France) Sébastien de Chaunac	3	2

=== Eighth qualifier ===
First round
8	(Germany) Björn Phau	6	7^{7}
(Slovakia) Ivo Klec	2	6^{4}
Alt	(Spain) Salvador Navarro	1	1
(Argentina) Juan Pablo Brzezicki	6	6
WC	(Australia) Domenic Marafiote	3	6^{1}
(France) Marc Gicquel	6	7^{7}
(Japan) Yaoki Ishii	4	4
18	(France) Jean-René Lisnard	6	6

Second round
8	(Germany) Björn Phau	6	7^{7}
(Argentina) Juan Pablo Brzezicki	1	6^{5}
(France) Marc Gicquel	0	3
18	(France) Jean-René Lisnard	6	6

Qualifying competition
8	(Germany) Björn Phau	3	2
18	(France) Jean-René Lisnard	6	6

=== Ninth qualifier ===
First round
9	(United States) Alex Bogomolov Jr.	3	7^{7}	7
(Spain) Daniel Gimeno-Traver	6	6^{5}	9
(Italy) Leonardo Azzaro	6	6^{5}	6
(France) Jean-Christophe Faurel	3	7^{7}	1
(Norway) Jan Frode Andersen	6^{4}	3
(Sweden) Marcus Sarstrand	7^{7}	6
(Russia) Teymuraz Gabashvili	3	4
27	(Cyprus) Marcos Baghdatis	6	6

Second round
(Spain) Daniel Gimeno-Traver	4	2
(Italy) Leonardo Azzaro	6	6
(Sweden) Marcus Sarstrand	2	1
27	(Cyprus) Marcos Baghdatis	6	6

Qualifying competition
(Italy) Leonardo Azzaro	2	4
27	(Cyprus) Marcos Baghdatis	6	6

=== Tenth qualifier ===
First round
10	(Switzerland) Ivo Heuberger	6	1	0^{r}
(France) Jean-Michel Pequery	3	6	1
(Germany) Dieter Kindlmann	6	3	6
(Japan) Gouichi Motomura	3	6	4
(Austria) Marco Mirnegg	6	4	3
(Israel) Harel Levy	4	6	6
(Croatia) Saša Tuksar	1	6^{3}
19	(France) Gilles Simon	6	7^{7}

Second round
(France) Jean-Michel Pequery	5	3
(Germany) Dieter Kindlmann	7	6
(Israel) Harel Levy	6	4	3
19	(France) Gilles Simon	4	6	6

Qualifying competition
(Germany) Dieter Kindlmann	1	7	6
19	(France) Gilles Simon	6	5	4

=== Eleventh qualifier ===
First round
11	(Switzerland) Marco Chiudinelli	4	6^{3}
(Netherlands) Melle van Gemerden	6	7^{7}
(Sweden) Filip Prpic	6	6
WC	(Australia) Luke Bourgeois	3	3
(Japan) Takahiro Terachi	4	5
(Canada) Frank Dancevic	6	7
(Czech Republic) Jan Vacek	2	2
17	(Italy) Francesco Aldi	6	6

Second round
(Netherlands) Melle van Gemerden	5	6	6
(Sweden) Filip Prpic	7	3	1
(Canada) Frank Dancevic	3	6	6
17	(Italy) Francesco Aldi	6	3	1

Qualifying competition
(Netherlands) Melle van Gemerden	6	6
(Canada) Frank Dancevic	2	2

=== Twelfth qualifier ===
First round
12	(France) Nicolas Mahut	6^{6}	4
(France) Julien Varlet	7^{8}	6
(Czech Republic) Lukáš Dlouhý	4	6	3
(Slovakia) Viktor Bruthans	6	4	6
(Sweden) Michael Ryderstedt	7^{9}	6
(Romania) Răzvan Sabău	6^{7}	2
(United Kingdom) Jamie Delgado	6^{5}	6	9
24	(Italy) Daniele Bracciali	7^{7}	2	11

Second round
(France) Julien Varlet	5	4
(Slovakia) Viktor Bruthans	7	6
(Sweden) Michael Ryderstedt	0	3
24	(Italy) Daniele Bracciali	6	6

Qualifying competition
(Slovakia) Viktor Bruthans	0	6	3
24	(Italy) Daniele Bracciali	6	3	6

=== Thirteenth qualifier ===
First round
Alt	(Chile) Adrián García	6	6
(Italy) Uros Vico	3	3
(Chinese Taipei) Chen Ti	2	3
(Israel) Andy Ram	6	6
(Argentina) Diego Hartfield	2	6^{9}
(United States) Bobby Reynolds	6	7^{11}
(Italy) Paolo Lorenzi	6	7^{7}
20	(France) Thierry Ascione	4	6^{4}

Second round
Alt	(Chile) Adrián García	1	7	0
(Israel) Andy Ram	6	5	6
(United States) Bobby Reynolds	2	7^{7}	6
(Italy) Paolo Lorenzi	6	6^{4}	4

Qualifying competition
(Israel) Andy Ram	4	6^{3}
(United States) Bobby Reynolds	6	7^{7}

=== Fourteenth qualifier ===
First round
14	(Germany) Alexander Waske	6	6
WC	(Australia) Joseph Sirianni	0	4
(France) Éric Prodon	3	3
(United States) Paul Goldstein	6	6
(United Kingdom) Alex Bogdanovic	6	6
(Slovakia) Ladislav Švarc	3	3
(United States) Eric Taino	3	2
25	(Croatia) Roko Karanušić	6	6

Second round
14	(Germany) Alexander Waske	6	3	2
(United States) Paul Goldstein	2	6	6
(United Kingdom) Alex Bogdanovic	6^{6}	6	1
25	(Croatia) Roko Karanušić	7^{8}	3	6

Qualifying competition
(United States) Paul Goldstein	4	6	2
25	(Croatia) Roko Karanušić	6	4	6

=== Fifteenth qualifier ===
First round
15	(South Africa) Wesley Moodie	6	6
WC	(Australia) Joel Kerley	2	4
(France) Arnaud Di Pasquale	3	6	1
(Russia) Yuri Schukin	6	3	6
(Serbia and Montenegro) Novak Djokovic	6	7
(Italy) Francesco Piccari	3	5
(Brazil) André Sá	6	3	3
32	(Switzerland) Stanislas Wawrinka	4	6	6

Second round
15	(South Africa) Wesley Moodie	6	6
(Russia) Yuri Schukin	3	3
(Serbia and Montenegro) Novak Djokovic	6	6
32	(Switzerland) Stanislas Wawrinka	3	1

Qualifying competition
15	(South Africa) Wesley Moodie	6	3	4
(Serbia and Montenegro) Novak Djokovic	4	6	6

=== Sixteenth qualifier ===
First round
16	(Spain) Marc López	7	6
(France) Jérôme Golmard	5	4
(Japan) Takao Suzuki	2	6	6
(Netherlands) Matwé Middelkoop	6	2	1
(Denmark) Kristian Pless	7	7^{7}
(Thailand) Danai Udomchoke	5	6^{5}
(Italy) Stefano Galvani	4	7	6
29	(Russia) Igor Kunitsyn	6	5	1

Second round
16	(Spain) Marc López	5	6	2
(Japan) Takao Suzuki	7	2	6
(Denmark) Kristian Pless	6	6
(Italy) Stefano Galvani	1	3

Qualifying competition
(Japan) Takao Suzuki	7	6
(Denmark) Kristian Pless	5	4
