= Marc Kimmich =

Australian tennis player

- Country (sports): Australia
- Residence: Brisbane, Queensland
- Born: 21 January 1983 (age 43) Stuttgart, West Germany
- Height: 183 cm (6 ft 0 in)
- Turned pro: 1999
- Plays: Right-handed
- Prize money: $70,565

Singles
- Career record: 0–3
- Career titles: 0
- Highest ranking: No. 226 (10 October 2005)

Grand Slam singles results
- Australian Open: 1R (2005, 2006)

Doubles
- Career record: 0–3
- Career titles: 0
- Highest ranking: No. 331 (15 August 2005)

Grand Slam doubles results
- Australian Open: 1R (2005)

Mixed doubles
- Career titles: 0

Grand Slam mixed doubles results
- Australian Open: 1R (2006)

Marc Kimmich (born 21 January 1983) is a former professional tennis player from Australia.

Kimmich was born in Stuttgart, West Germany, and moved to Australia with his family at the age of five.

He received a wildcard entry into the 2005 Australian Open and faced Mariano Zabaleta in the first round, losing in four sets. In the men's doubles, he partnered with Adam Feeney but was eliminated in the first round by the Russian duo of Igor Andreev and Nikolay Davydenko.

At the 2006 Australian Open, Kimmich again received a wildcard but was defeated in the first round of the singles tournament by the 26th seed, Jarkko Nieminen. He also participated in the mixed doubles with partner Lisa McShea, but the pair lost in the opening round.
