= Scott Draper =

Australian tennis player and golfer

- Country (sports): Australia
- Residence: Gold Coast, Australia
- Born: 5 June 1974 (age 52) Brisbane, Australia
- Height: 1.75 m (5 ft 9 in)
- Turned pro: 1993
- Retired: 2005
- Plays: Left-handed (single-handed backhand)
- Prize money: $1,594,598

Singles
- Career record: 107–129
- Career titles: 1
- Highest ranking: No. 42 (10 May 1999)

Grand Slam singles results
- Australian Open: 3R (1997)
- French Open: 4R (1995, 1996)
- Wimbledon: 2R (1998, 2002, 2003)
- US Open: 4R (1997)

Doubles
- Career record: 26–47
- Career titles: 0
- Highest ranking: No. 132 (12 February 1996)

Grand Slam doubles results
- Australian Open: QF (1996)
- Wimbledon: 2R (1995, 2003)
- US Open: 1R (1995, 1996)

Grand Slam mixed doubles results
- Australian Open: W (2005)
- Wimbledon: 3R (1996)
- Last updated on: 5 June 2022.

Scott Dennis Draper (born 5 June 1974) is an Australian former tennis player and golfer. He won the Australian Open Mixed Doubles with Samantha Stosur in 2005. Draper also reached the fourth round of the 1995 and 1996 French Opens and the fourth round of the US Open in 1997. His most significant achievement in singles was winning the 1998 Queen's Club Championships, the lowest ranked player ever to do so.

== Early life ==
Draper was born and raised in Brisbane, Australia. He attended Brisbane State High School. His older brother, Mark, reached a singles career-high ranking of No.152 in September 1998 and his sister, Sharon, was a top junior.

== Tennis career ==
=== Juniors ===
Draper reached a high of No. 5 in the junior world doubles rankings in 1992, after winning the Wimbledon Boys' Doubles title.

Junior Slam results – Singles:

Australian Open: SF (1992)
French Open: 1R (1992)
Wimbledon: 2R (1992)
US Open: –

== Junior Grand Slam finals ==
=== Doubles: 1 (1 title) ===
Result	Year	Tournament	Surface	Partner	Opponents	Score
Win	1992	Wimbledon	Grass	(Australia) Steven Baldas	(India) Mahesh Bhupathi (India) Nitten Kirrtane	6–1, 4–6, 9–7

== ATP career finals ==
=== Singles: 3 (1 title, 2 runners-up) ===
Legend Grand Slam Tournaments (0–0) ATP World Tour Finals (0–0) ATP Masters Series (0–0) ATP Championship Series (0–1) ATP World Series (1–1)	Finals by surface Hard (0–2) Clay (0–0) Grass (1–0) Carpet (0–0)	Finals by setting Outdoors (1–2) Indoors (0–0)

Result	W–L	Date	Tournament	Tier	Surface	Opponent	Score
Loss	0–1	Jan 1997	Adelaide, Australia	World Series	Hard	(Australia) Todd Woodbridge	2–6, 1–6
Win	1–1	Jun 1998	Queen's, United Kingdom	World Series	Grass	(Italy) Laurence Tieleman	7–6^{(7–5)}, 6–4
Loss	1–2	Jul 1998	Washington, United States	Championship Series	Hard	(United States) Andre Agassi	2–6, 0–6

=== Doubles: 1 (1 runner-up) ===
Legend Grand Slam Tournaments (0–0) ATP World Tour Finals (0–0) ATP Masters Series (0–0) ATP Championship Series (0–0) ATP World Series (0–1)	Finals by surface Hard (0–0) Clay (0–0) Grass (0–1) Carpet (0–0)	Finals by setting Outdoors (0–1) Indoors (0–0)

Result	W–L	Date	Tournament	Tier	Surface	Partner	Opponents	Score
Loss	0–1	Jul 1998	Newport, United States	World Series	Grass	(Australia) Jason Stoltenberg	(United States) Doug Flach (Australia) Sandon Stolle	2–6, 6–4, 6–7

=== Mixed Doubles: 1 (1 title) ===
Legend Grand Slam Tournaments (1–0) ATP World Tour Finals (0–0) ATP Masters Series (0–0) ATP Championship Series (0–0) ATP World Series (0–0)	Finals by surface Hard (1–0) Clay (0–0) Grass (0–0) Carpet (0–0)	Finals by setting Outdoors (1–0) Indoors (0–0)

Result	W–L	Date	Tournament	Tier	Surface	Partner	Opponents	Score
Win	1–0	Jan 2005	Melbourne, Australia	Grand Slam	Hard	(Australia) Samantha Stosur	(Zimbabwe) Kevin Ullyett (South Africa) Liezel Huber	6–2, 2–6, [10–6]

== ATP Challenger and ITF Futures finals ==
=== Singles: 5 (5–0) ===
Legend ATP Challenger (4–0) ITF Futures (1–0)	Finals by surface Hard (5–0) Clay (0–0) Grass (0–0) Carpet (0–0)

Result	W–L	Date	Tournament	Tier	Surface	Opponent	Score
Win	1–0	Apr 1995	Nagoya, Japan	Challenger	Hard	(Japan) Shuzo Matsuoka	6–3, 6–7, 6–4
Win	2–0	Nov 2001	Australia F3, Beaumaris	Futures	Hard	(Republic of Ireland) Peter Clarke	6–1, 7–6^{(7–3)}
Win	3–0	Aug 2002	Lexington, United States	Challenger	Hard	(United States) Paul Goldstein	4–6, 6–4, 6–4
Win	4–0	Aug 2002	Binghamton, United States	Challenger	Hard	(Australia) Peter Luczak	7–6^{(7–5)}, 6–4
Win	5–0	Oct 2002	Fresno, United States	Challenger	Hard	(United States) Justin Gimelstob	6–1, 6–7^{(5–7)}, 6–1

=== Doubles: 2 (1–1) ===
Legend ATP Challenger (1–1) ITF Futures (0–0)	Finals by surface Hard (0–0) Clay (0–0) Grass (1–1) Carpet (0–0)

Result	W–L	Date	Tournament	Tier	Surface	Partner	Opponents	Score
Loss	0–1	Dec 1994	Adelaide, Australia	Challenger	Grass	(Australia) Peter Tramacchi	(India) Mahesh Bhupathi (Belgium) Dick Norman	6–7, 6–7
Win	1–1	Jun 1999	Surbiton, United States	Challenger	Grass	(Australia) Todd Woodbridge	(United States) Justin Gimelstob (United States) Scott Humphries	walkover

== Performance timelines ==
Key
W	F	SF	QF	#R	RR	Q#	DNQ	A	NH

(W) winner; (F) finalist; (SF) semifinalist; (QF) quarterfinalist; (#R) rounds 4, 3, 2, 1; (RR) round-robin stage; (Q#) qualification round; (DNQ) did not qualify; (A) absent; (NH) not held; (SR) strike rate (events won / competed); (W–L) win–loss record.

=== Singles ===
Tournament	1992	1993	1994	1995	1996	1997	1998	1999	2000	2001	2002	2003	2004	2005	SR	W–L	Win %
Grand Slam tournaments
Australian Open	Q1	Q1	Q1	1R	1R	3R	2R	1R	1R	1R	1R	2R	A	1R	0 / 10	4–10	29%
French Open	A	A	A	4R	4R	1R	2R	1R	A	1R	1R	1R	A	1R	0 / 9	7–9	44%
Wimbledon	A	A	A	1R	1R	1R	2R	1R	A	1R	2R	2R	A	1R	0 / 9	3–9	25%
US Open	A	A	A	3R	2R	4R	1R	1R	Q3	A	Q1	1R	A	A	0 / 6	6–6	50%
Win–loss	0–0	0–0	0–0	5–4	4–4	5–4	3–4	0–4	0–1	0–3	1–3	2–4	0–0	0–3	0 / 34	20–34	37%
ATP World Tour Masters 1000
Indian Wells	A	A	A	A	Q1	Q1	2R	2R	A	A	A	Q1	A	A	0 / 2	2–2	50%
Miami	A	A	A	A	2R	3R	1R	2R	A	A	A	Q1	A	A	0 / 4	4–4	50%
Monte Carlo	A	A	A	A	A	Q1	A	A	A	A	A	A	A	A	0 / 0	0–0	–
Hamburg	A	A	A	Q3	A	1R	A	A	A	A	A	1R	A	A	0 / 2	0–2	0%
Rome	A	A	A	A	A	QF	A	1R	A	A	A	Q1	A	A	0 / 2	3–2	60%
Canada	A	A	A	2R	1R	2R	2R	A	A	A	A	1R	A	A	0 / 5	3–5	38%
Cincinnati	A	A	A	Q2	1R	2R	3R	A	Q1	A	A	1R	A	A	0 / 4	3–4	43%
Paris	A	A	A	A	Q2	A	A	A	A	A	A	A	A	A	0 / 0	0–0	–
Win–loss	0–0	0–0	0–0	1–1	1–3	7–5	4–4	2–3	0–0	0–0	0–0	0–3	0–0	0–0	0 / 19	15–19	44%

=== Doubles ===
Tournament	1995	1996	1997	1998	1999	2000	2001	2002	2003	2004	2005	SR	W–L	Win %
Grand Slam tournaments
Australian Open	3R	QF	2R	2R	2R	2R	2R	1R	2R	A	A	0 / 9	11–9	55%
French Open	A	A	A	A	A	A	A	A	A	A	A	0 / 0	0–0	–
Wimbledon	2R	1R	A	A	A	A	A	A	2R	A	Q1	0 / 3	2–3	40%
US Open	1R	1R	A	A	A	A	A	A	A	A	A	0 / 2	0–2	0%
Win–loss	3–3	3–3	1–1	1–1	1–1	1–1	1–1	0–1	2–2	0–0	0–0	0 / 14	13–14	48%
ATP World Tour Masters 1000
Indian Wells	A	Q1	A	A	A	A	A	A	A	A	A	0 / 0	0–0	–
Miami	A	1R	A	A	A	A	A	A	A	A	A	0 / 1	0–1	0%
Hamburg	1R	A	A	A	A	A	A	A	A	A	A	0 / 1	0–1	0%
Canada	Q1	A	Q1	A	A	A	A	A	A	A	A	0 / 0	0–0	–
Cincinnati	Q1	A	1R	A	A	A	A	A	A	A	A	0 / 1	0–1	0%
Win–loss	0–1	0–1	0–1	0–0	0–0	0–0	0–0	0–0	0–0	0–0	0–0	0 / 3	0–3	0%

=== Mixed Doubles ===
Tournament	1996	1997	1998	1999	2000	2001	2002	2003	2004	2005	SR	W–L	Win %
Grand Slam tournaments
Australian Open	1R	1R	A	A	A	2R	1R	1R	A	W	1 / 6	6–5	55%
French Open	A	A	A	A	A	A	A	A	A	A	0 / 0	0–0	–
Wimbledon	3R	A	A	A	A	A	A	A	A	A	0 / 1	2–1	67%
US Open	A	A	A	A	A	A	A	A	A	A	0 / 0	0–0	–
Win–loss	2–2	0–1	0–0	0–0	0–0	1–1	0–1	0–1	0–0	5–0	1 / 7	8–6	57%

== Golf career ==
Draper has also played golf professionally. He made his professional debut in the 2005 Victorian Open, a 54-hole event played from 28 to 30 January. Draper had accepted an offer from Sam Stosur to play in the mixed doubles at the 2005 Australian Open which also finished on 30 January. Draper and Stosur reached the semi-final, which meant that Draper had to play in the first round of the golf in the morning and the semi-final of the tennis in the afternoon. Draper played his second round on the following day but missed the cut. This meant he was free to compete in the final of the mixed doubles on 30 January. On 11 February 2007, Draper won the New South Wales PGA Championship on the Von Nida Tour. He finished the four-round event with a score of 268, 20-under-par, one stroke ahead of Andrew Bonhomme and Aaron Townsend.

Draper played as a professional golfer from 2005 to 2008 when a back injury ended his professional career. Although he played tennis left-handed, he played golf right-handed.

== Professional wins (1) ==
=== Von Nida Tour wins (1) ===
No.	Date	Tournament	Winning score	Margin of victory	Runners-up
1	11 Feb 2007	Riverside Oaks NSW PGA Championship	−20 (70-66-67-65=268)	1 stroke	(Australia) Andrew Bonhomme, (Australia) Aaron Townsend

== Personal life ==
Draper married his first wife, Kellie, in 1998 and she died in 1999 from cystic fibrosis. He has since remarried to Jessica, the mother of his first child, Jayden (born 3 May 2007).
