= 2005 Australian Open – Boys' doubles =

Boys' doubles
- 2005 Australian Open

Final
- Champion: (South Korea) Kim Sun-yong (Chinese Taipei) Chu-Huan Yi
- Runner-up: (Netherlands) Thiemo de Bakker (United States) Donald Young
- Score: 6–3, 6–4

Events
Singles	men	women		boys	girls
Doubles	men	women	mixed	boys	girls
WC Singles	men	women	quad
WC Doubles	men	women	quad
Legends	men	women	mixed
- Australian Open

Kim Sun-yong and Chu-Huan Yi won the title by defeating Thiemo de Bakker and Donald Young 6–3, 6–4 in the final.

== Seeds ==
1. (South Korea) Kim Sun-yong / (Chinese Taipei) Chu-Huan Yi (champions)
2. (Ukraine) Sergei Bubka / (France) Jérémy Chardy (second round)
3. (Netherlands) Thiemo de Bakker / (United States) Donald Young (final)
4. (Slovakia) Pavol Červenák / (Slovakia) Lukáš Lacko (first round)
5. (United States) Timothy Neilly / (United States) Tim Smyczek (first round)
6. (Czech Republic) Dušan Lojda / (Czech Republic) Jan Marek (second round)
7. (Netherlands) Robin Haase / (Netherlands) Antal van der Duim (quarterfinals)
8. (Italy) Andrea Arnaboldi / (Denmark) Martin Pedersen (quarterfinals)

== Draw ==
Key

- Q = Qualifier
- WC = Wild card
- LL = Lucky loser
- Alt = Alternate
- ITF = ITF entry
- PR = Protected ranking
- SR = Special ranking
- SE = Special exempt
- JE = Junior exempt
- JR = Junior Accelerator Programme entrant
- CO = College Accelerator Programme entrant
- NG = Next Gen Accelerator Program entrant
- w/o = Walkover
- r = Retired
- d = Defaulted

=== Finals ===
Semifinals
1	(South Korea) Kim Sun-yong (Chinese Taipei) Chu-Huan Yi	6	6
(United States) Jesse Levine (United States) Michael Shabaz	1	4
3	(Netherlands) Thiemo de Bakker (United States) Donald Young	6^{7}	7	7
(United States) Alex Clayton (United States) Michael Johnson	7^{9}	5	5

Final
1	(South Korea) Kim Sun-yong (Chinese Taipei) Chu-Huan Yi	6	6
3	(Netherlands) Thiemo de Bakker (United States) Donald Young	3	4

=== Top half ===
First round
1	(South Korea) Kim Sun-yong (Chinese Taipei) Chu-Huan Yi	7^{7}	6
WC	(Australia) Stephen Donald (Australia) Ben Rocavert	6^{2}	2
(Kazakhstan) Syrym Abdukhalikov (Australia) Todd Ley	4	4
(Canada) Philip Bester (Canada) Peter Polansky	6	6
(Austria) Richard Ruckelshausen (Namibia) Jurgens Strydom	6	6
(Croatia) Jurica Grubisic (Croatia) Petar Jelenić	4	4
(United States) Dylan Arnould (United States) Marcus Fugate	7	5	2
8	(Italy) Andrea Arnaboldi (Denmark) Martin Pedersen	5	7	6
4	(Slovakia) Pavol Červenák (Slovakia) Lukáš Lacko	3	4
(United States) Jesse Levine (United States) Michael Shabaz	6	6
(Mexico) Miguel Ángel Reyes-Varela (The Bahamas) Ryan Sweeting	6	6
WC	(Australia) Matthew Ebden (Australia) Luke Weightman	3	3
(Australia) Andrew Coelho (Australia) Steven Goh	w/o
(Israel) Victor Kolik (United States) Bryan Koniecko
(Greece) Paris Gemouchidis (Denmark) Thomas Kromann	1	1
7	(Netherlands) Robin Haase (Netherlands) Antal van der Duim	6	6

Second round
1	(South Korea) S-y Kim (Chinese Taipei) C-H Yi	6^{3}	6	6
(Canada) P Bester (Canada) P Polansky	7^{7}	2	3
(Austria) R Ruckelshausen (Namibia) J Strydom	1	0
8	(Italy) A Arnaboldi (Denmark) M Pedersen	6	6
(United States) J Levine (United States) M Shabaz	3	6	6
(Mexico) MÁ Reyes-Varela (The Bahamas) R Sweeting	6	1	4
(Australia) A Coelho (Australia) S Goh	2	3
7	(Netherlands) R Haase (Netherlands) A van der Duim	6	6

Quarterfinals
1	(South Korea) S-y Kim (Chinese Taipei) C-H Yi	6	6
8	(Italy) A Arnaboldi (Denmark) M Pedersen	3	2
(United States) J Levine (United States) M Shabaz	7^{7}	6
7	(Netherlands) R Haase (Netherlands) A van der Duim	6^{5}	2

Semifinals
1	(South Korea) S-y Kim (Chinese Taipei) C-H Yi	6	6
(United States) J Levine (United States) M Shabaz	1	4

=== Bottom half ===
First round
5	(United States) Timothy Neilly (United States) Tim Smyczek	6^{2}	5
WC	(Australia) Michael Look (Australia) Patrick Nicholls	7^{7}	7
(Australia) Tomas Habsuda (Czech Republic) Jiří Školoudík	7^{7}	6
(Germany) Benedict Halbroth (Kuwait) Abdullah Maqdes	6^{0}	4
(Japan) Takanobu Fujii (Japan) Yūichi Sugita	6^{3}	2
(Croatia) Marin Čilić (Slovenia) Luka Ocvirk	7^{7}	6
(Thailand) Weerapat Doakmaiklee (Republic of Ireland) Tristan Farron-Mahon	4	6	6^{3}
3	(Netherlands) Thiemo de Bakker (United States) Donald Young	6	3	7^{7}
6	(Czech Republic) Dušan Lojda (Czech Republic) Jan Marek	6	6
(New Zealand) Martin Colenbrander (Germany) Jochen Schoettler	1	4
(Croatia) Filip Siladi (Croatia) Franko Škugor	6	6
(Ukraine) Alexandr Dolgopolov (Belarus) Serguei Tarasevitch	3	3
(Australia) Carsten Ball (United States) Jamie Hunt	3	3
(United States) Alex Clayton (United States) Michael Johnson	6	6
WC	(Australia) Sams Groth (Australia) Joel Lindner	1	1
2	(Ukraine) Sergei Bubka (France) Jérémy Chardy	6	6

Second round
WC	(Australia) M Look (Australia) P Nicholls	1	6^{5}
(Australia) T Habsuda (Czech Republic) J Skoloudik	6	7^{7}
(Croatia) M Čilić (Slovenia) L Ocvirk	2	3
3	(Netherlands) T de Bakker (United States) D Young	6	6
6	(Czech Republic) D Lojda (Czech Republic) J Marek	6^{1}	6	4
(Croatia) F Siladi (Croatia) F Škugor	7^{7}	3	6
(United States) A Clayton (United States) M Johnson	w/o
2	(Ukraine) S Bubka (France) J Chardy

Quarterfinals
(Australia) T Habsuda (Czech Republic) J Skoloudik	1	3
3	(Netherlands) T de Bakker (United States) D Young	6	6
(Croatia) F Siladi (Croatia) F Škugor	3	4
(United States) A Clayton (United States) M Johnson	6	6

Semifinals
3	(Netherlands) T de Bakker (United States) D Young	6^{7}	7	7
(United States) A Clayton (United States) M Johnson	7^{9}	5	5

== Sources ==
- Draw
