= 2005 Australian Open – Boys' singles =

Boys' singles
- 2005 Australian Open

Final
- Champion: (United States) Donald Young
- Runner-up: (South Korea) Kim Sun-yong
- Score: 6–2, 6–4

Events
Singles	men	women		boys	girls
Doubles	men	women	mixed	boys	girls
WC Singles	men	women	quad
WC Doubles	men	women	quad
Legends	men	women	mixed
- Australian Open

Gaël Monfils was the defending champion, but did not compete in the Juniors in this year.

Donald Young defeated Kim Sun-yong (6–2, 6–4) in the final.

== Seeds ==
1. (South Korea) Kim Sun-yong (final)
2. (United States) Donald Young (champion)
3. (Slovakia) Lukáš Lacko (quarterfinals)
4. (Netherlands) Robin Haase (semifinals)
5. (Chinese Taipei) Chu-Huan Yi (second round)
6. (Ukraine) Sergei Bubka (semifinals)
7. (United States) Timothy Neilly (quarterfinals)
8. (Czech Republic) Dušan Lojda (third round)
9. (France) Jérémy Chardy (second round)
10. (United States) Tim Smyczek (first round)
11. (Slovakia) Pavol Červenák (third round)
12. (Ukraine) Alexandr Dolgopolov (second round)
13. (Netherlands) Thiemo de Bakker (second round)
14. (Croatia) Franko Škugor (third round)
15. (Germany) Jochen Schoettler (third round)
16. (Denmark) Martin Pedersen (second round)

== Draw ==
Key

- Q = Qualifier
- WC = Wild card
- LL = Lucky loser
- Alt = Alternate
- ITF = ITF entry
- PR = Protected ranking
- SR = Special ranking
- SE = Special exempt
- JE = Junior exempt
- JR = Junior Accelerator Programme entrant
- CO = College Accelerator Programme entrant
- NG = Next Gen Accelerator Program entrant
- w/o = Walkover
- r = Retired
- d = Defaulted

=== Finals ===
Quarterfinals
1	(South Korea) Kim Sun-yong	5	6	6
(Australia) Carsten Ball	7	3	2
4	(Netherlands) Robin Haase	6	6
7	(United States) Timothy Neilly	3	2
6	(Ukraine) Sergei Bubka	7	7
3	(Slovakia) Lukáš Lacko	5	5
(Croatia) Marin Čilić	3	5
2	(United States) Donald Young	6	7

Semifinals
1	(South Korea) Kim Sun-yong	5	6	7
4	(Netherlands) Robin Haase	7	2	5
6	(Ukraine) Sergei Bubka	2	4
2	(United States) Donald Young	6	6

Final
1	(South Korea) Kim Sun-yong	2	4
2	(United States) Donald Young	6	6

=== Top half ===
==== Section 1 ====
First round
1	(South Korea) Kim Sun-yong	6^{6}	7	6
(United States) Jesse Levine	7^{8}	5	2
Q	(Indonesia) Elbert Sie	3	6^{6}
(Netherlands) Antal van der Duim	6	7^{8}
(Croatia) Petar Jelenić	6	2	6
(Czech Republic) Jiri Skoloudik	3	6	2
(Canada) Peter Polansky	2	2
16	(Denmark) Martin Pedersen	6	6
11	(Slovakia) Pavol Červenák	6	6
WC	(Australia) Joel Lindner	4	2
(Italy) Andrea Arnaboldi	7^{7}	7^{8}
(Australia) Michael Look	6^{4}	6^{6}
(Belarus) Serguei Tarasevitch	3	4
(Australia) Carsten Ball	6	6
(Kuwait) Abdullah Maqdes	6^{2}	4
5	(Chinese Taipei) Chu-Huan Yi	7^{7}	6

Second round
1	(South Korea) S-y Kim	6	7^{7}
(Netherlands) A van der Duim	2	6^{3}
(Croatia) P Jelenić	4	7^{7}	6
16	(Denmark) M Pedersen	6	6^{1}	3
11	(Slovakia) P Červenák	6	3	6
(Italy) A Arnaboldi	1	6	3
(Australia) C Ball	6	7
5	(Chinese Taipei) C-H Yi	4	5

Third round
1	(South Korea) S-y Kim	6^{2}	6	4
(Croatia) P Jelenić	7^{7}	3	3^{r}
11	(Slovakia) P Červenák	6	4	0
(Australia) C Ball	3	6	6

Quarterfinals
1	(South Korea) S-y Kim	5	6	6
(Australia) C Ball	7	3	2

==== Section 2 ====
First round
4	(Netherlands) Robin Haase	6	5	6
Q	(Austria) Richard Ruckelshausen	4	7	2
Q	(Greece) Paris Gemouchidis	5	6	5
(Czech Republic) Jan Marek	7	1	7
Q	(Denmark) Thomas Kromann	3	6^{1}
WC	(Australia) Todd Ley	6	7^{7}
(Germany) Benedict Halbroth	5	2
14	(Croatia) Franko Škugor	7	6
12	(Ukraine) Alexandr Dolgopolov	7	6
(Mexico) Miguel Ángel Reyes-Varela	5	3
Q	(New Zealand) Martin Colenbrander	7^{7}	6^{5}	4
Q	(Namibia) Jurgens Strydom	6^{5}	7^{7}	6
(United States) Marcus Fugate	6	7
(Republic of Ireland) Tristan Farron-Mahon	4	5
WC	(Australia) James Lemke	6^{3}	6^{5}
7	(United States) Timothy Neilly	7^{7}	7^{7}

Second round
4	(Netherlands) R Haase	6	6
(Czech Republic) J Marek	4	1
WC	(Australia) T Ley	1	6^{4}
14	(Croatia) F Škugor	6	7^{7}
12	(Ukraine) A Dolgopolov	6	6^{5}	2
Q	(Namibia) J Strydom	4	7^{7}	6
(United States) M Fugate	2	4
7	(United States) T Neilly	6	6

Third round
4	(Netherlands) R Haase	6	7
14	(Croatia) F Škugor	3	5
Q	(Namibia) J Strydom	4	2
7	(United States) T Neilly	6	6

Quarterfinals
4	(Netherlands) R Haase	6	6
7	(United States) T Neilly	3	2

=== Bottom half ===
==== Section 3 ====
First round
6	(Ukraine) Sergei Bubka	6	6
(United States) Bryan Koniecko	2	3
WC	(Australia) Stephen Donald	6	3	1
(Croatia) Jurica Grubisic	2	6	6
(Australia) Andrew Coelho	4	7^{7}	8
(Slovenia) Luka Ocvirk	6	6^{4}	6
(The Bahamas) Ryan Sweeting	6	2	6
10	(United States) Tim Smyczek	3	6	2
15	(Germany) Jochen Schoettler	1	6	6
(United Kingdom) Myles Blake	6	3	2
(United States) Jamie Hunt	7^{10}	1	1
Q	(Croatia) Filip Siladi	6^{8}	6	6
(United States) Michael Johnson	6	6
(Thailand) Weerapat Doakmaiklee	3	3
(Croatia) Dylan Arnould	2	2
3	(Slovakia) Lukáš Lacko	6	6

Second round
6	(Ukraine) S Bubka	7	6
(Croatia) J Grubisic	5	0
(Australia) A Coelho	5	6	12
(The Bahamas) R Sweeting	7	4	14
15	(Germany) J Schoettler	6	7
Q	(Croatia) F Siladi	4	5
(United States) M Johnson	0	4
3	(Slovakia) L Lacko	6	6

Third round
6	(Ukraine) S Bubka	6	7^{7}
(The Bahamas) R Sweeting	4	6^{1}
15	(Germany) J Schoettler	3	2
3	(Slovakia) L Lacko	6	6

Quarterfinals
6	(Ukraine) S Bubka	7	7
3	(Slovakia) L Lacko	5	5

==== Section 4 ====
First round
8	(Czech Republic) Dušan Lojda	6	7
(United States) Alex Clayton	2	5
WC	(Australia) Nick Lindahl	4	6	6
Q	(New Zealand) Rubin Statham	6	4	3
(Croatia) Marin Čilić	6	6
(Australia) Steven Goh	3	1
(Hong Kong) Martin Sayer	1	6^{4}
9	(France) Jérémy Chardy	6	7^{7}
13	(Netherlands) Thiemo de Bakker	5	6	6
WC	(Australia) Tomas Habsuda	7	3	3
(United States) Michael Shabaz	6	6
WC	(Australia) Ben Rocavert	3	3
(Japan) Takanobu Fujii	4	6^{8}
WC	(Australia) Patrick Nicholls	6	7^{10}
(Canada) Philip Bester	6^{2}	1
2	(United States) Donald Young	7^{7}	6

Second round
8	(Czech Republic) D Lojda	6^{4}	6	6
WC	(Australia) N Lindahl	7^{7}	3	2
(Croatia) M Čilić	7^{9}	6
9	(France) J Chardy	6^{7}	4
13	(Netherlands) T de Bakker	2	6	2
(United States) M Shabaz	6	4	6
WC	(Australia) P Nicholls	3	7	2
2	(United States) D Young	6	5	6

Third round
8	(Czech Republic) D Lojda	4	2
(Croatia) M Čilić	6	6
(United States) M Shabaz	2	4
2	(United States) D Young	6	6

Quarterfinals
(Croatia) M Čilić	3	5
2	(United States) D Young	6	7

== Sources ==
- Draw
