= Timothy Neilly =

Bahamian tennis player (born 1987)

- Country (sports): United States (–2007); Bahamas (2008–)
- Residence: Miami Beach, Florida, United States
- Born: 24 August 1987 (age 37); Freeport, Bahamas
- Plays: Right-handed (two-handed backhand)
- Prize money: $10,833

Singles
- Career record: 1–5
- Career titles: 0; 0 Challenger, 0 Futures
- Highest ranking: No. 852 (22 March 2010)

Doubles
- Career record: 0–0
- Career titles: 0; 0 Challenger, 0 Futures
- Highest ranking: No. 924 (14 May 2007)
- Last updated on: 15 November 2021.

Timothy Neilly (born 24 August 1987) is a retired Bahamian-American tennis player.

Neilly has a career-high ATP singles ranking of World No. 852, achieved on 22 March 2010. He also has a career-high ATP doubles ranking of World No. 924, achieved on 14 May 2007.

As a junior, Neilly was a prominent player on ITF Junior Circuit, reaching as high as World No. 8. In 2004, he won the prestigious Orange Bowl singles under-18 title, defeating American Donald Young 6–4, 7–5 in the final.

Beginning in 2008, Neilly represented his native country the Bahamas, competing in the Davis Cup. He has an overall record of 3 wins and 5 losses across 6 ties played.

== ATP Challenger and ITF Futures finals ==
=== Singles: 1 (0–1) ===
Legend ATP Challenger (0–0) ITF Futures (0–1)	Finals by surface Hard (0–0) Clay (0–1) Grass (0–0) Carpet (0–0)

Result	W–L	Date	Tournament	Tier	Surface	Opponent	Score
Loss	0–1	May 2009	USA F9, Vero Beach	Futures	Clay	(France) Jonathan Dasnières de Veigy	7-6^{(8-6)}, 3-6, 1-6

=== Doubles: 3 (0–3) ===
Legend ATP Challenger (0–0) ITF Futures (0–3)	Finals by surface Hard (0–0) Clay (0–3) Grass (0–0) Carpet (0–0)

Result	W–L	Date	Tournament	Tier	Surface	Partner	Opponents	Score
Loss	0–1	May 2007	USA F9, Vero Beach	Futures	Clay	(United States) Marcus Fugate	(United States) Ryler Deheart (United States) Chris Lam	4–6, 1–6
Loss	0–2	Nov 2009	USA F29, Amelia Island	Futures	Clay	(United States) Marcus Fugate	(United States) Adam El Mihdawy (United States) Denis Zivkovic	2–6, 6–3, [2–10]
Loss	0–3	Jan 2010	USA F1, Plantation	Futures	Clay	(United States) Marcus Fugate	(Italy) Stefano Ianni (Latvia) Deniss Pavlovs	2–6, 2–6
