= 2005 Australian Open – Women's doubles =

Tennis doubles tournament won by Kuznetsova/Molik

Women's doubles
- 2005 Australian Open

Final
- Champion: (Russia) Svetlana Kuznetsova (Australia) Alicia Molik
- Runner-up: (United States) Lindsay Davenport (United States) Corina Morariu
- Score: 6–3, 6–4

Details
- Draw: 64
- Seeds: 16

Events
Singles	men	women		boys	girls
Doubles	men	women	mixed	boys	girls
WC Singles	men	women	quad
WC Doubles	men	women	quad
Legends	men	women	mixed
- Australian Open

Virginia Ruano Pascual and Paola Suárez were the defending champions, but Suárez did not participate due to injury. Ruano Pascual partnered Conchita Martínez, but lost in the first round to Jennifer Hopkins and Mashona Washington.

Svetlana Kuznetsova and Alicia Molik won the title, defeating Lindsay Davenport and Corina Morariu in the final 6–3, 6–4. This was Davenport's sixth and final appearance in the women's doubles final at the Australian Open; her loss in the final meant that she was not able to complete the Career Grand Slam in Doubles even though she reached the semi-finals for nine times.

== Seeds ==
1. (Russia) Nadia Petrova / (United States) Meghann Shaughnessy (withdrew)
2. (Zimbabwe) Cara Black / (South Africa) Liezel Huber (second round)
3. (United States) Lisa Raymond / (Australia) Rennae Stubbs (second round)
4. (Spain) Conchita Martínez / (Spain) Virginia Ruano Pascual (first round)
5. (Slovakia) Janette Husárová / (Russia) Elena Likhovtseva (second round)
6. (Russia) Svetlana Kuznetsova / (Australia) Alicia Molik (champions)
7. (Russia) Anastasia Myskina / (Russia) Vera Zvonareva (semifinals)
8. (Russia) Elena Dementieva / (Japan) Ai Sugiyama (third round)
9. (Austria) Barbara Schett / (Switzerland) Patty Schnyder (first round)
10. (China) Li Ting / (China) Sun Tiantian (third round)
11. (Argentina) Gisela Dulko / (Venezuela) María Vento-Kabchi (second round)
12. (China) Yan Zi / (China) Zheng Jie (first round)
13. (Italy) Francesca Schiavone / (Italy) Roberta Vinci (first round)
14. (Japan) Shinobu Asagoe / (Slovenia) Katarina Srebotnik (third round)
15. (United States) Lindsay Davenport / (United States) Corina Morariu (finals)
16. (Greece) Eleni Daniilidou / (Australia) Nicole Pratt (quarterfinals)

== Draw ==
Key

- Q = Qualifier
- WC = Wild card
- LL = Lucky loser
- Alt = Alternate
- ITF = ITF entry
- PR = Protected ranking
- SR = Special ranking
- SE = Special exempt
- JE = Junior exempt
- JR = Junior Accelerator Programme entrant
- CO = College Accelerator Programme entrant
- NG = Next Gen Accelerator Program entrant
- w/o = Walkover
- r = Retired
- d = Defaulted

=== Finals ===
Quarterfinals
(Slovakia) Daniela Hantuchová (United States) Martina Navratilova	3	0
6	(Russia) Svetlana Kuznetsova (Australia) Alicia Molik	6	6
16	(Greece) Eleni Daniilidou (Australia) Nicole Pratt	4	3
7	(Russia) Anastasia Myskina (Russia) Vera Zvonareva	6	6
(United States) Jennifer Russell (Italy) Mara Santangelo	2	3
(Czech Republic) Gabriela Navrátilová (Czech Republic) Michaela Paštiková	6	6
(Spain) Anabel Medina Garrigues (Russia) Dinara Safina	1	6	1
15	(United States) Lindsay Davenport (United States) Corina Morariu	6	3	6

Semifinals
6	(Russia) Svetlana Kuznetsova (Australia) Alicia Molik	6	6
7	(Russia) Anastasia Myskina (Russia) Vera Zvonareva	2	3
(Czech Republic) Gabriela Navrátilová (Czech Republic) Michaela Paštiková	6	2	3
15	(United States) Lindsay Davenport (United States) Corina Morariu	3	6	6

Finals
6	(Russia) Svetlana Kuznetsova (Australia) Alicia Molik	6	6
15	(United States) Lindsay Davenport (United States) Corina Morariu	3	4

=== Top half ===
==== Section 1 ====
First round
Alt	(Brazil) M Alves (Germany) V Henke	1	3
(Slovakia) D Hantuchová (United States) M Navratilova	6	6
WC	(Australia) T Musgrave (Australia) C Wheeler	6	2	6
(Hungary) Z Gubacsi (Hungary) P Mandula	2	6	3
(Romania) R Dragomir Ilie (Canada) M Drake	6	6
(Czech Republic) O Blahotová (Czech Republic) L Prusová	4	1
WC	(Australia) S Ferguson (Australia) J Hewitt	4	1
14	(Japan) S Asagoe (Slovenia) K Srebotnik	6	6
9	(Austria) B Schett (Switzerland) P Schnyder	5	4
(Venezuela) M Sequera (United States) M Tu	7	6
(Latvia) L Dekmeijere (Japan) N Miyagi	4	7	6
(Spain) A Parra Santonja (Spain) M Serna	6	5	3
WC	(Luxembourg) A Kremer (Spain) M Sánchez Lorenzo	6	2	2
(Estonia) M Ani (Italy) F Pennetta	4	6	6
(France) N Dechy (France) É Loit	3	2
6	(Russia) S Kuznetsova (Australia) A Molik	6	6

Second round
(Slovakia) D Hantuchová (United States) M Navratilova	6	6
WC	(Australia) T Musgrave (Australia) C Wheeler	2	0
(Romania) R Dragomir Ilie (Canada) M Drake	4	6	5
14	(Japan) S Asagoe (Slovenia) K Srebotnik	6	3	7
(Venezuela) M Sequera (United States) M Tu	6	6
(Latvia) L Dekmeijere (Japan) N Miyagi	2	2
(Estonia) M Ani (Italy) F Pennetta	0	3
6	(Russia) S Kuznetsova (Australia) A Molik	6	6

Third round
(Slovakia) D Hantuchová (United States) M Navratilova	6	6
14	(Japan) S Asagoe (Slovenia) K Srebotnik	4	4
(Venezuela) M Sequera (United States) M Tu	6	3	3
6	(Russia) S Kuznetsova (Australia) A Molik	3	6	6

Quarterfinals
(Slovakia) D Hantuchová (United States) M Navratilova	3	0
6	(Russia) S Kuznetsova (Australia) A Molik	6	6

==== Section 2 ====
First round
3	(United States) L Raymond (Australia) R Stubbs	6	4	6
(Germany) M Müller (Germany) J Schruff	0	6	3
(Russia) M Kirilenko (Russia) L Krasnoroutskaya	3	1
(France) M Bartoli (Germany) A-L Grönefeld	6	6
(Italy) T Garbin (Slovenia) T Križan	6	7
(United States) J Craybas (Germany) M Weingärtner	3	5
(New Zealand) L Baker (Italy) F Lubiani	4	5
16	(Greece) E Daniilidou (Australia) N Pratt	6	7
10	(China) T Li (China) T Sun	6	6
(Spain) M Marrero (Italy) A Serra Zanetti	2	3
(France) C Dhenin (Croatia) S Talaja	3	2
(Czech Republic) D Chládková (Slovakia) Ľ Kurhajcová	6	6
WC	(Chinese Taipei) S-w Hsieh (Japan) S Okamoto	3	6^{5}
(Australia) B Stewart (Australia) S Stosur	6	7
(France) S Cohen-Aloro (Tunisia) S Sfar	6^{5}	3
7	(Russia) A Myskina (Russia) V Zvonareva	7	6

Second round
3	(United States) L Raymond (Australia) R Stubbs	0	r
(France) M Bartoli (Germany) A-L Grönefeld	1
(Italy) T Garbin (Slovenia) T Križan	4	3
16	(Greece) E Daniilidou (Australia) N Pratt	6	6
10	(China) T Li (China) T Sun	3	6	6
(Czech Republic) D Chládková (Slovenia) Ľ Kurhajcová	6	0	3
(Australia) B Stewart (Australia) S Stosur	6^{4}	7	6^{4}
7	(Russia) A Myskina (Russia) V Zvonareva	7	6^{3}	7

Third round
(France) M Bartoli (Germany) A-L Grönefeld	3	6	4
16	(Greece) E Daniilidou (Australia) N Pratt	6	2	6
10	(China) T Li (China) T Sun	1	5
7	(Russia) A Myskina (Russia) V Zvonareva	6	7

Quarterfinals
16	(Greece) E Daniilidou (Australia) N Pratt	4	3
7	(Russia) A Myskina (Russia) V Zvonareva	6	6

=== Bottom half ===
==== Section 3 ====
First round
8	(Russia) E Dementieva (Japan) A Sugiyama	6	6
(Ukraine) Y Fedak (Belarus) T Poutchek	3	0
WC	(Australia) B Sekulovski (Australia) C Watson	2	6	6
(Russia) A Rodionova (United States) A Spears	6	3	4
(Russia) A Jidkova (Ukraine) T Perebiynis	4	7	2
(United States) J Russell (Italy) M Santangelo	6	5	6
(Ukraine) Y Beygelzimer (Turkey) İ Şenoğlu	2	6	6
12	(China) Z Yan (China) J Zheng	6	2	4
13	(Italy) F Schiavone (Italy) R Vinci	7	4	2
(Chinese Taipei) J Lee (China) S Peng	6^{3}	6	6
WC	(Serbia and Montenegro) J Janković (Hungary) A Kapros	7	7
(South Africa) N Grandin (Spain) C Martínez Granados	6^{4}	5
(United States) T Ashley (United States) L Granville	4	6	3
(Czech Republic) G Navrátilová (Czech Republic) M Paštiková	6	6^{1}	6
(United States) J Hopkins (United States) M Washington	7	6
4	(Spain) C Martínez (Spain) V Ruano Pascual	5	4

Second round
8	(Russia) E Dementieva (Japan) A Sugiyama	6	6
WC	(Australia) B Sekulovski (Australia) C Watson	3	3
(United States) J Russell (Italy) M Santangelo	6	6^{4}	6
(Ukraine) Y Beygelzimer (Turkey) İ Şenoğlu	3	7	3
(Chinese Taipei) J Lee (China) S Peng	7	6
WC	(Serbia and Montenegro) J Janković (Hungary) A Kapros	6^{3}	3
(Czech Republic) G Navrátilová (Czech Republic) M Paštiková	2	6	6
(United States) J Hopkins (United States) M Washington	6	4	3

Third round
8	(Russia) E Dementieva (Japan) A Sugiyama	4	4
(United States) J Russell (Italy) M Santangelo	6	6
(Chinese Taipei) J Lee (China) S Peng	2	6	1
(Czech Republic) G Navrátilová (Czech Republic) M Paštiková	6	4	6

Quarterfinals
(United States) J Russell (Italy) M Santangelo	2	3
(Czech Republic) G Navrátilová (Czech Republic) M Paštiková	6	6

==== Section 4 ====
First round
5	(Slovakia) J Husárová (Russia) E Likhovtseva	6	6
(Australia) C Dellacqua (Australia) N Sewell	3	3
(Chinese Taipei) C-j Chuang (Japan) R Fujiwara	6	7
(Italy) ME Camerin (Italy) S Farina Elia	2	5
(Spain) A Medina Garrigues (Russia) D Safina	6	6
(Spain) N Llagostera Vives (Russia) G Voskoboeva	3	4
(Belgium) E Callens (Australia) L McShea	5	1
11	(Argentina) G Dulko (Venezuela) M Vento-Kabchi	7	6
15	(United States) L Davenport (United States) C Morariu	6	6
WC	(Australia) D Dominikovic (Australia) E Dominikovic	2	2
(Austria) P Wartusch (Germany) J Wöhr	2	3
(Ukraine) A Bondarenko (Switzerland) E Gagliardi	6	6
(Czech Republic) E Birnerová (Romania) A Vanc	7	6^{5}	6
(Czech Republic) I Benešová (Czech Republic) K Peschke	5	7	2
(Croatia) J Kostanić (Luxembourg) C Schaul	2	0
2	(Zimbabwe) C Black (South Africa) L Huber	6	6

Second round
5	(Slovakia) J Husárová (Russia) E Likhovtseva	7	1	5
(Chinese Taipei) C-j Chuang (Japan) R Fujiwara	6^{1}	6	7
(Spain) A Medina Garrigues (Russia) D Safina	6	6^{6}	6
11	(Argentina) G Dulko (Venezuela) M Vento-Kabchi	1	7	4
15	(United States) L Davenport (United States) C Morariu	6	6
(Ukraine) A Bondarenko (Switzerland) E Gagliardi	4	2
(Czech Republic) E Birnerová (Romania) A Vanc	6^{6}	7	6
2	(Zimbabwe) C Black (South Africa) L Huber	7	5	3

Third round
(Chinese Taipei) C-j Chuang (Japan) R Fujiwara	2	3
(Spain) A Medina Garrigues (Russia) D Safina	6	6
15	(United States) L Davenport (United States) C Morariu	6	6
(Czech Republic) E Birnerová (Romania) A Vanc	2	2

Quarterfinals
(Spain) A Medina Garrigues (Russia) D Safina	1	6	1
15	(United States) L Davenport (United States) C Morariu	6	3	6
