= 2005 Australian Open – Mixed doubles =

Mixed doubles
- 2005 Australian Open

Final
- Champions: (Australia) Samantha Stosur (Australia) Scott Draper
- Runners-up: (South Africa) Liezel Huber (Zimbabwe) Kevin Ullyett
- Score: 6–2, 2–6, [10–6]

Details
- Draw: 32
- Seeds: 8

Events
Singles	men	women		boys	girls
Doubles	men	women	mixed	boys	girls
WC Singles	men	women	quad
WC Doubles	men	women	quad
Legends	men	women	mixed
- Australian Open

Samantha Stosur and Scott Draper defeated Liezel Huber and Kevin Ullyett in the final 6–2, 2–6, [10–6] to win the mixed doubles title at the 2005 Australian Open. This was the first Grand Slam title for both Stosur and Draper, and would be Draper's only Grand Slam title.

Elena Bovina and Nenad Zimonjić were the defending champions, but Bovina did not compete due to a left foot injury. Zimonjić participated with Elena Likhovtseva, and the pair lost in the second round to Stosur and Draper.

== Seeds ==
1. (Australia) Rennae Stubbs / (Canada) Daniel Nestor (quarterfinals)
2. (Zimbabwe) Cara Black / (Zimbabwe) Wayne Black (quarterfinals)
3. (Spain) Conchita Martínez / (Israel) Andy Ram (semifinals)
4. (South Africa) Liezel Huber / (Zimbabwe) Kevin Ullyett (final)
5. (Russia) Vera Zvonareva / (United States) Bob Bryan (quarterfinals)
6. (Russia) Elena Likhovtseva / (Serbia and Montenegro) Nenad Zimonjić (second round)
7. (United States) Martina Navratilova / (Belarus) Max Mirnyi (semifinals)
8. (Slovakia) Janette Husárová / (Czech Republic) Leoš Friedl (second round)

== Draw ==
Key

- Q = Qualifier
- WC = Wild card
- LL = Lucky loser
- Alt = Alternate
- ITF = ITF entry
- PR = Protected ranking
- SR = Special ranking
- SE = Special exempt
- JE = Junior exempt
- JR = Junior Accelerator Programme entrant
- CO = College Accelerator Programme entrant
- NG = Next Gen Accelerator Program entrant
- w/o = Walkover
- r = Retired
- d = Defaulted

=== Finals ===
Semifinals
3	(Spain) Conchita Martínez (Israel) Andy Ram	5	3
WC	(Australia) Samantha Stosur (Australia) Scott Draper	7	6
4	(South Africa) Liezel Huber (Zimbabwe) Kevin Ullyett	6	3	[10]
7	(United States) Martina Navratilova (Belarus) Max Mirnyi	2	6	[8]

Final
WC	(Australia) Samantha Stosur (Australia) Scott Draper	6	2	[10]
4	(South Africa) Liezel Huber (Zimbabwe) Kevin Ullyett	2	6	[6]

=== Top half ===
First round
1	(Australia) R Stubbs (Canada) D Nestor	4	6	[10]
(Italy) R Vinci (Czech Republic) P Pála	6	4	[7]
(Venezuela) M Vento-Kabchi (Argentina) M Hood	7	6
WC	(Australia) S Ferguson (Australia) L Bourgeois	6^{1}	2
3	(Spain) C Martínez (Israel) A Ram	5	7	[10]
Alt	(Argentina) G Dulko (Argentina) S Prieto	7	6^{8}	[6]
(France) É Loit (Argentina) G Etlis	5	3
8	(Slovakia) J Husárová (Czech Republic) L Friedl	7	6
Alt	(United States) M Tu (South Africa) C Haggard	4	6	[4]
WC	(Australia) T Musgrave (Australia) W Arthurs	6	2	[10]
(Belgium) E Callens (Czech Republic) M Damm	6	7
(United States) C Morariu (Australia) P Hanley	3	6^{5}
(Slovakia) D Hantuchová (The Bahamas) M Knowles	3	6^{2}
WC	(Australia) S Draper (Australia) S Stosur	6	7
(Australia) L McShea (Czech Republic) C Suk	3	1
6	(Russia) E Likhovtseva (Serbia and Montenegro) N Zimonjić	6	6

Second round
1	(Australia) R Stubbs (Canada) D Nestor	6	6
(Venezuela) M Vento-Kabchi (Argentina) M Hood	2	3
3	(Spain) C Martínez (Israel) A Ram	6^{4}	6	[10]
8	(Slovakia) J Husárová (Czech Republic) L Friedl	7	1	[6]
WC	(Australia) T Musgrave (Australia) W Arthurs	w	/	o
(Belgium) E Callens (Czech Republic) M Damm
WC	(Australia) S Draper (Australia) S Stosur	6	7
6	(Russia) E Likhovtseva (Serbia and Montenegro) N Zimonjić	2	6^{7}

Quarterfinals
1	(Australia) R Stubbs (Canada) D Nestor	5	7	[12]
3	(Spain) C Martínez (Israel) A Ram	7	6^{3}	[14]
WC	(Australia) T Musgrave (Australia) W Arthurs	2	6^{7}
WC	(Australia) S Draper (Australia) S Stosur	6	7

Semifinals
3	(Spain) C Martínez (Israel) A Ram	5	3
WC	(Australia) S Draper (Australia) S Stosur	7	6

=== Bottom half ===
First round
5	(Russia) V Zvonareva (United States) B Bryan	6	6^{6}	[10]
(Switzerland) E Gagliardi (Argentina) M Rodríguez	2	7	[8]
(China) Z Yan (Sweden) S Aspelin	3	4
Alt	(Slovenia) K Srebotnik (Czech Republic) F Čermák	6	6
(Austria) B Schett (Austria) J Knowle	6	1	[6]
WC	(China) N Liu (Chinese Taipei) Y-h Lu	4	6	[10]
(Venezuela) M Sequera (Australia) T Perry	3	6	[5]
4	(South Africa) L Huber (Zimbabwe) K Ullyett	6	2	[10]
7	(United States) M Navratilova (Belarus) M Mirnyi	6	6
(Greece) E Daniilidou (Australia) T Woodbridge	4	4
(Australia) N Pratt (Czech Republic) P Vízner	6	6
WC	(Australia) E Dominikovic (Australia) N Healey	1	4
(Spain) V Ruano Pascual (United States) R Leach	6	7
(China) T Sun (Israel) J Erlich	3	6^{4}
WC	(Australia) J Hewitt (Australia) P Luczak	2	3
2	(Zimbabwe) C Black (Zimbabwe) W Black	6	6

Second round
5	(Russia) V Zvonareva (United States) B Bryan	6	6
Alt	(Slovenia) K Srebotnik (Czech Republic) F Čermák	3	2
WC	(China) N Liu (Chinese Taipei) Y-h Lu
4	(South Africa) L Huber (Zimbabwe) K Ullyett	w	/	o
7	(United States) M Navratilova (Belarus) M Mirnyi	w	/	o
(Australia) N Pratt (Czech Republic) P Vízner
(Spain) V Ruano Pascual (United States) R Leach	7	6^{4}	[8]
2	(Zimbabwe) C Black (Zimbabwe) W Black	5	7	[10]

Quarterfinals
5	(Russia) V Zvonareva (United States) B Bryan	7	3	[8]
4	(South Africa) L Huber (Zimbabwe) K Ullyett	6^{5}	6	[10]
7	(United States) M Navratilova (Belarus) M Mirnyi	7	6
2	(Zimbabwe) C Black (Zimbabwe) W Black	5	4

Semifinals
4	(South Africa) L Huber (Zimbabwe) K Ullyett	6	3	[10]
7	(United States) M Navratilova (Belarus) M Mirnyi	2	6	[8]
