= 2005 Australian Open – Men's singles =

Men's singles
- 2005 Australian Open

Final
- Champion: (Russia) Marat Safin
- Runner-up: (Australia) Lleyton Hewitt
- Score: 1–6, 6–3, 6–4, 6–4

Details
- Draw: 128
- Seeds: 32

Events
Singles	men	women		boys	girls
Doubles	men	women	mixed	boys	girls
WC Singles	men	women	quad
WC Doubles	men	women	quad
Legends	men	women	mixed
- Australian Open

Marat Safin defeated Lleyton Hewitt in the final, 1–6, 6–3, 6–4, 6–4 to win the men's singles tennis title at the 2005 Australian Open. It was his first Australian Open title (following two runner-up finishes in 2002 and 2004) and second and last major title overall, after the 2000 US Open. It was also his last ATP title overall. Safin saved a match point en route to the title, against Roger Federer in the semifinals. Hewitt was the first Australian to reach the final since Pat Cash in 1988.

Federer was the defending champion, but lost in the semifinals to Safin in a rematch of the previous year's final, despite holding a match point in the fourth set. Federer's loss ended his 26-match winning streak dating to the 2004 US Open.

The final attracted many viewers in Australia (primarily due to the presence of countryman Hewitt), averaging 4.05 million viewers. The viewing audience remains one of the highest in Australian history. The match was broadcast in the host nation by host broadcaster the Seven Network with commentators Bruce McAvaney and two-time champion Jim Courier (in his first appearance on Australian commercial television).

This tournament marked the major main-draw debut of future ten-time Australian Open champion and 24-time major champion Novak Djokovic (who qualified for the main draw before losing to Safin in the first round), and the last Australian Open for four-time champion Andre Agassi. Additionally, future 22-time major champion Rafael Nadal advanced beyond the third round of a major for the first time, losing to Hewitt in the fourth round. The tournament was also the only major in which Federer, Nadal, and Djokovic all competed but none reached the final.

== Seeds ==
1. (Switzerland) Roger Federer (semifinals)
2. (United States) Andy Roddick (semifinals)
3. (Australia) Lleyton Hewitt (final)
4. (Russia) Marat Safin (champion)
5. (Spain) Carlos Moyá (first round)
6. (Argentina) Guillermo Coria (fourth round)
7. (United Kingdom) Tim Henman (third round)
8. (United States) Andre Agassi (quarterfinals)
9. (Argentina) David Nalbandian (quarterfinals)
10. (Argentina) Gastón Gaudio (third round)
11. (Sweden) Joachim Johansson (fourth round)
12. (Argentina) Guillermo Cañas (fourth round)
13. (Spain) Tommy Robredo (third round)
14. (France) Sébastien Grosjean (second round)
15. (Russia) Mikhail Youzhny (second round)
16. (Germany) Tommy Haas (second round)
17. (Romania) Andrei Pavel (second round)
18. (Chile) Nicolás Massú (second round)
19. (United States) Vincent Spadea (first round)
20. (Slovakia) Dominik Hrbatý (quarterfinals)
21. (Germany) Nicolas Kiefer (first round)
22. (Croatia) Ivan Ljubičić (second round)
23. (Chile) Fernando González (third round)
24. (Spain) Feliciano López (third round)
25. (Argentina) Juan Ignacio Chela (third round)
26. (Russia) Nikolay Davydenko (quarterfinals)
27. (Thailand) Paradorn Srichaphan (second round)
28. (Croatia) Mario Ančić (third round)
29. (United States) Taylor Dent (third round)
30. (Sweden) Thomas Johansson (fourth round)
31. (Spain) Juan Carlos Ferrero (third round)
32. (Austria) Jürgen Melzer (third round)

== Draw ==
Key

- Q = Qualifier
- WC = Wild card
- LL = Lucky loser
- Alt = Alternate
- ITF = ITF entry
- PR = Protected ranking
- SR = Special ranking
- SE = Special exempt
- JE = Junior exempt
- JR = Junior Accelerator Programme entrant
- CO = College Accelerator Programme entrant
- NG = Next Gen Accelerator Program entrant
- w/o = Walkover
- r = Retired
- d = Defaulted

=== Finals ===
Quarterfinals
1	(Switzerland) Roger Federer	6	6	6
8	(United States) Andre Agassi	3	4	4
4	(Russia) Marat Safin	6	6	6
20	(Slovakia) Dominik Hrbatý	2	4	2
9	(Argentina) David Nalbandian	3	2	6	6	8
3	(Australia) Lleyton Hewitt	6	6	1	3	10
26	(Russia) Nikolay Davydenko	3	5	1^{r}
2	(United States) Andy Roddick	6	7	4

Semifinals
1	(Switzerland) Roger Federer	7	4	7	6^{6}	7
4	(Russia) Marat Safin	5	6	5	7^{8}	9
3	(Australia) Lleyton Hewitt	3	7^{7}	7^{7}	6
2	(United States) Andy Roddick	6	6^{3}	6^{4}	1

Final
4	(Russia) Marat Safin	1	6	6	6
3	(Australia) Lleyton Hewitt	6	3	4	4

=== Top half ===
==== Section 1 ====
First round
1	(Switzerland) R Federer	6	6	6
(France) F Santoro	1	1	2
Q	(Japan) T Suzuki	6	6	6
(United States) J-M Gambill	4	3	3
(Italy) D Sanguinetti	6	4	3	2
(Finland) J Nieminen	3	6	6	6
(Italy) P Starace	6	2	5	4
27	(Thailand) P Srichaphan	1	6	7	6
22	(Croatia) I Ljubičić	6	6	6
(Peru) L Horna	4	3	3
Q	(Italy) F Luzzi	1	6	1	6	3
Q	(Cyprus) M Baghdatis	6	3	6	3	6
WC	(Chinese Taipei) Y-t Wang	6^{5}	2	4
Q	(Czech Republic) T Zíb	7^{7}	6	6
PR	(Australia) S Draper	7	2	4	2
13	(Spain) T Robredo	5	6	6	6

Second round
1	(Switzerland) R Federer	6	6	6
Q	(Japan) T Suzuki	3	4	4
(Finland) J Nieminen	6	6	6
27	(Thailand) P Srichaphan	3	4	2
22	(Croatia) I Ljubičić	6^{1}	4	7^{7}	2
Q	(Cyprus) M Baghdatis	7^{7}	6	6^{2}	6
Q	(Czech Republic) T Zíb	4	6	2	4
13	(Spain) T Robredo	6	2	6	6

Third round
1	(Switzerland) R Federer	6	5
(Finland) J Nieminen	3	2^{r}
Q	(Cyprus) M Baghdatis	7^{7}	6	6
13	(Spain) T Robredo	6^{2}	4	1

Fourth round
1	(Switzerland) R Federer	6	6	7^{7}
Q	(Cyprus) M Baghdatis	2	2	6^{4}

==== Section 2 ====
First round
11	(Sweden) J Johansson	7^{8}	6	6
(Netherlands) S Schalken	6^{6}	2	3
(Chinese Taipei) Y-h Lu	3	4	4
(Netherlands) P Wessels	6	6	6
(Armenia) S Sargsian	7^{7}	4	1	6	6
(Spain) D Sánchez	6^{5}	6	6	4	2
WC	(Australia) P Baccanello	5	5	2
24	(Spain) F López	7	7	6
29	(United States) T Dent	7	6	6
Q	(France) F Serra	5	2	4
(Czech Republic) M Tabara	3	6	6	6
(Sweden) T Enqvist	6	2	3	3
Q	(France) O Patience	6^{3}	3	2
(Germany) R Schüttler	7^{7}	6	6
Q	(Germany) D Kindlmann	4	3	0
8	(United States) A Agassi	6	6	6

Second round
11	(Sweden) J Johansson	6	7	6
(Netherlands) P Wessels	3	5	4
(Armenia) S Sargsian	6	3	4	6^{3}
24	(Spain) F López	4	6	6	7^{7}
29	(United States) T Dent	6	6	6
(Czech Republic) M Tabara	4	1	4
(Germany) R Schüttler	3	1	0
8	(United States) A Agassi	6	6	6

Third round
11	(Sweden) J Johansson	6	3	5	7^{7}	13
24	(Spain) F López	3	6	7	6^{2}	11
29	(United States) T Dent	5	6^{3}	1
8	(United States) A Agassi	7	7^{7}	6

Fourth round
11	(Sweden) J Johansson	7^{7}	6^{5}	6^{3}	4
8	(United States) A Agassi	6^{4}	7^{7}	7^{7}	6

==== Section 3 ====
First round
4	(Russia) M Safin	6	6	6
Q	(Serbia and Montenegro) N Djokovic	0	2	1
(Croatia) I Karlović	3	7^{7}	5	2
(Czech Republic) B Ulihrach	6	6^{5}	7	6
LL	(Germany) B Phau	6	7^{7}	6
(Spain) A Costa	3	6^{4}	3
(Spain) Ó Hernández	3	2	1
28	(Croatia) M Ančić	6	6	6
21	(Germany) N Kiefer	5	6	6	2	3
(Belgium) O Rochus	7	2	3	6	6
(United States) R Ginepri	6	3	4	6^{6}
WC	(France) G Monfils	1	6	6	7^{8}
WC	(Australia) T Reid	2	2	1
(Slovakia) K Beck	6	6	6
(Belgium) X Malisse	3	2	3
16	(Germany) T Haas	6	6	6

Second round
4	(Russia) M Safin	6	6	6
(Czech Republic) B Ulihrach	4	1	3
LL	(Germany) B Phau	5	2	1
28	(Croatia) M Ančić	7	6	6
(Belgium) O Rochus	6	6	6
WC	(France) G Monfils	1	3	3
(Slovakia) K Beck	5	2	6	7^{7}	6
16	(Germany) T Haas	7	6	2	6^{5}	3

Third round
4	(Russia) M Safin	6	3	6	6
28	(Croatia) M Ančić	4	6	3	4
(Belgium) O Rochus	6^{6}	6	6	6
(Slovakia) K Beck	7^{8}	1	4	2

Fourth round
4	(Russia) M Safin	4	7^{7}	7^{7}	7^{7}
(Belgium) O Rochus	6	6^{1}	6^{5}	6^{2}

==== Section 4 ====
First round
10	(Argentina) G Gaudio	7^{7}	6	6
PR	(United States) J Gimelstob	6^{3}	4	3
(Argentina) J Mónaco	6	0	4	6	7
(United States) M Fish	2	6	6	4	9
Q	(Serbia and Montenegro) J Tipsarević	7^{7}	7^{8}	3	6
Q	(Italy) D Bracciali	6^{4}	6^{6}	6	1
(Sweden) R Söderling	4	2	0^{r}
20	(Slovakia) D Hrbatý	6	6	1
30	(Sweden) T Johansson	7^{7}	4	6	4	6
WC	(Australia) P Luczak	6^{5}	6	3	6	0
(Argentina) A Calleri	6	5	6	4	6
(Belarus) M Mirnyi	4	7	4	6	4
(United States) K Kim	3	6	6	3	6
(South Korea) H-t Lee	6	4	3	6	1
Q	(Spain) G García-López	7	6	3	6
5	(Spain) C Moyà	5	3	6	3

Second round
10	(Argentina) G Gaudio	2	6	7	7^{7}
(United States) M Fish	6	4	5	6^{4}
Q	(Serbia and Montenegro) J Tipsarević	2	6^{1}	6	5
20	(Slovakia) D Hrbatý	6	7^{7}	3	7
30	(Sweden) T Johansson	6	5	6	2	7
(Argentina) A Calleri	4	7	3	6	5
(United States) K Kim	6	6	6
Q	(Spain) G García-López	2	4	2

Third round
10	(Argentina) G Gaudio	6^{5}	7^{10}	7^{7}	1	3
20	(Slovakia) D Hrbatý	7^{7}	6^{8}	6^{3}	6	6
30	(Sweden) T Johansson	3	6	6^{4}	6	6
(United States) K Kim	6	2	7^{7}	2	2

Fourth round
20	(Slovakia) D Hrbatý	7	6	6
30	(Sweden) T Johansson	5	3	1

=== Bottom half ===
==== Section 5 ====
First round
6	(Argentina) G Coria	6	6	6
(Czech Republic) T Berdych	2	4	0
(Brazil) R Mello	6	6	7^{7}
(Spain) A Martín	3	3	6^{5}
WC	(Australia) M Kimmich	4	2	7^{7}	3
(Argentina) M Zabaleta	6	6	6^{5}	6
Q	(Netherlands) M Van Gemerden	6	3	4	4
31	(Spain) JC Ferrero	2	6	6	6
23	(Chile) F González	3	3	6	6	7
(Argentina) J Acasuso	6	6	3	3	5
(Germany) L Burgsmüller	6^{2}	1	2
(Russia) I Andreev	7^{7}	6	6
(Spain) Á Calatrava	6	3	4	6	4
(Spain) S Ventura	3	6	6	4	6
(Spain) D Ferrer	6^{1}	6	6	3	4
9	(Argentina) D Nalbandian	7^{7}	4	4	6	6

Second round
6	(Argentina) G Coria	6	6^{3}	6	7^{7}
(Brazil) R Mello	4	7^{7}	3	6^{3}
(Argentina) M Zabaleta	1	2	0
31	(Spain) JC Ferrero	6	6	6
23	(Chile) F González	7	6	6
(Russia) I Andreev	5	2	3
(Spain) S Ventura	0	3	6	2
9	(Argentina) D Nalbandian	6	6	2	6

Third round
6	(Argentina) G Coria	6	6	6
31	(Spain) JC Ferrero	3	2	1
23	(Chile) F González	7^{7}	5	2	3
9	(Argentina) D Nalbandian	6^{3}	7	6	6

Fourth round
6	(Argentina) G Coria	7	5	3	0
9	(Argentina) D Nalbandian	5	7	6	6

==== Section 6 ====
First round
15	(Russia) M Youzhny	6	6	7
(France) J Haehnel	2	2	5
(France) J Benneteau	0	4	2
(Spain) R Nadal	6	6	6
Q	(United States) B Reynolds	5	6	7^{9}	7^{7}
(Spain) N Almagro	7	4	6^{7}	6^{5}
(France) O Mutis	4	4	0
17	(Romania) A Pavel	6	6	6
25	(Argentina) JI Chela	6	7^{7}	7^{7}
(Australia) W Arthurs	4	6^{4}	6^{1}
PR	(France) P-H Mathieu	4	7	5	6^{5}
(France) G Carraz	6	5	7	7^{7}
(Germany) F Mayer	1	2	0
(United States) J Blake	6	6	6
(France) A Clément	3	4	1
3	(Australia) L Hewitt	6	6	6

Second round
15	(Russia) M Youzhny	1	6	6	5	3
(Spain) R Nadal	6	4	4	7	6
Q	(United States) B Reynolds	7^{8}	6	6
17	(Romania) A Pavel	6^{6}	2	2
25	(Argentina) JI Chela	7^{9}	6	7^{7}
(France) G Carraz	6^{7}	2	6^{3}
(United States) J Blake	6	6^{8}	0	3
3	(Australia) L Hewitt	4	7^{10}	6	6

Third round
(Spain) R Nadal	6	6	6
Q	(United States) B Reynolds	1	1	3
25	(Argentina) JI Chela	2	6	1	4
3	(Australia) L Hewitt	6	4	6	6

Fourth round
(Spain) R Nadal	5	6	6	6^{3}	2
3	(Australia) L Hewitt	7	3	1	7^{7}	6

==== Section 7 ====
First round
7	(United Kingdom) T Henman	6	6	4	6
(France) C Saulnier	1	2	6	3
(Italy) F Volandri	3	4	6^{1}
(Romania) V Hănescu	6	6	7^{7}
LL	(Belgium) C Rochus	6	6	6
(Spain) A Montañés	2	3	3
Q	(Croatia) R Karanušić	2	5	2
26	(Russia) N Davydenko	6	7	6
19	(United States) V Spadea	3	7	6	5	3
(Czech Republic) R Štěpánek	6	5	4	7	6
(Spain) F Mantilla	4	7^{7}	1	0
(Czech Republic) J Hernych	6	6^{5}	6	6
(Spain) F Verdasco	6	6	6
(Luxembourg) G Müller	3	0	4
WC	(Australia) C Guccione	4	2	6^{4}
12	(Argentina) G Cañas	6	6	7^{7}

Second round
7	(United Kingdom) T Henman	7	6	6
(Romania) V Hănescu	5	1	4
LL	(Belgium) C Rochus	4	4	2
26	(Russia) N Davydenko	6	6	6
(Czech Republic) R Štěpánek	7^{7}	6	1	6^{2}	6
(Czech Republic) J Hernych	6^{5}	1	6	7^{7}	0
(Spain) F Verdasco	6	5	3	0
12	(Argentina) G Cañas	3	7	6	6

Third round
7	(United Kingdom) T Henman	4	2	2
26	(Russia) N Davydenko	6	6	6
(Czech Republic) R Štěpánek	1	2	2
12	(Argentina) G Cañas	6	6	6

Fourth round
26	(Russia) N Davydenko	6	6	6
12	(Argentina) G Cañas	3	4	3

==== Section 8 ====
First round
14	(France) S Grosjean	6	6	6
(France) M Llodra	3	4	3
Q	(Austria) O Marach	7	7	1	4	5
Q	(France) J-R Lisnard	5	5	6	6	7
(Denmark) K Carlsen	6^{2}	2	1
(Germany) P Kohlschreiber	7^{7}	6	6
(France) A Dupuis	7^{9}	6^{2}	3	2
18	(Chile) N Massú	6^{7}	7^{7}	6	6
32	(Austria) J Melzer	3
(Netherlands) R Sluiter	3^{r}
(Brazil) F Saretta	6	6	1	0^{r}
WC	(Australia) N Healey	4	4	6	5
(Sweden) J Björkman	6	4	0	6^{7}
(United Kingdom) G Rusedski	2	6	6	7^{9}
(Georgia (country)) I Labadze	5	2	1
2	(United States) A Roddick	7	6	6

Second round
14	(France) S Grosjean	6	6	3	4	3
Q	(France) J-R Lisnard	1	4	6	6	6
(Germany) P Kohlschreiber	6	2
18	(Chile) N Massú	0	0^{r}
32	(Austria) J Melzer	6	6	7^{7}
WC	(Australia) N Healey	3	2	6^{3}
(United Kingdom) G Rusedski	0	6	2	3
2	(United States) A Roddick	6	3	6	6

Third round
Q	(France) J-R Lisnard	5	3	2
(Germany) P Kohlschreiber	7	6	6
32	(Austria) J Melzer	2	2	5
2	(United States) A Roddick	6	6	7

Fourth round
(Germany) P Kohlschreiber	3	6^{6}	1
2	(United States) A Roddick	6	7^{8}	6

== Other entry information ==
=== Wild cards ===
- (Australia) Paul Baccanello
- (Australia) Chris Guccione
- (Australia) Nathan Healey
- (Australia) Marc Kimmich
- (Australia) Peter Luczak
- (France) Gaël Monfils
- (Australia) Todd Reid
- (Chinese Taipei) Wang Yeu-tzuoo

=== Protected ranking ===
- (Australia) Scott Draper
- (United States) Justin Gimelstob
- (France) Paul-Henri Mathieu

=== Qualifiers ===
- (Cyprus) Marcos Baghdatis
- (Italy) Daniele Bracciali
- (Serbia and Montenegro) Novak Djokovic
- (Spain) Guillermo García López
- (Croatia) Roko Karanušić
- (Germany) Dieter Kindlmann
- (France) Jean-René Lisnard
- (Italy) Federico Luzzi
- (Austria) Oliver Marach
- (France) Olivier Patience
- (United States) Bobby Reynolds
- (France) Florent Serra
- (Japan) Takao Suzuki
- (Serbia and Montenegro) Janko Tipsarević
- (Netherlands) Melle van Gemerden
- (Czech Republic) Tomáš Zíb

=== Lucky losers ===
- (Germany) Björn Phau
- (Belgium) Christophe Rochus

=== Withdrawals ===
- (Morocco) Hicham Arazi → replaced by (United States) Justin Gimelstob
- (Morocco) Younes El Aynaoui → replaced by (Germany) Björn Phau
- (France) Nicolas Escudé → replaced by (Spain) Félix Mantilla
- (Austria) Stefan Koubek → replaced by (France) Arnaud Clément
- (Slovakia) Karol Kučera → replaced by (Italy) Davide Sanguinetti
- (Brazil) Gustavo Kuerten → replaced by (Australia) Scott Draper
- (United States) Jeff Morrison → replaced by (Brazil) Flávio Saretta
- (Czech Republic) Jiří Novák → replaced by (France) Olivier Mutis
- (Russia) Dmitry Tursunov → replaced by (Spain) Nicolás Almagro
- (Netherlands) Martin Verkerk → replaced by (Belgium) Christophe Rochus

Preceded by 2004 US Open – Men's singles	Grand Slam men's singles	Succeeded by 2005 French Open – Men's singles
