= 2005 Australian Open – Men's doubles =

Men's doubles
- 2005 Australian Open

Final
- Champions: (Zimbabwe) Wayne Black (Zimbabwe) Kevin Ullyett
- Runners-up: (United States) Bob Bryan (United States) Mike Bryan
- Score: 6–4, 6–4

Details
- Draw: 64
- Seeds: 16

Events
Singles	men	women		boys	girls
Doubles	men	women	mixed	boys	girls
WC Singles	men	women	quad
WC Doubles	men	women	quad
Legends	men	women	mixed
- Australian Open

Michaël Llodra and Fabrice Santoro were the defending champions, but they lost in quarterfinals 6–7^{(2–7)}, 5–7, against Jonas Björkman and Max Mirnyi.

Wayne Black and Kevin Ullyett defeated Bob Bryan and Mike Bryan 6–4, 6–4 in the final to win the men's doubles title.

== Seeds ==
1. (The Bahamas) Mark Knowles / (Canada) Daniel Nestor (first round)
2. (United States) Bob Bryan / (United States) Mike Bryan (final)
3. (India) Mahesh Bhupathi / (Australia) Todd Woodbridge (quarterfinals)
4. (Sweden) Jonas Björkman / (Belarus) Max Mirnyi (semifinals)
5. (Zimbabwe) Wayne Black / (Zimbabwe) Kevin Ullyett (champions)
6. (France) Michaël Llodra / (France) Fabrice Santoro (quarterfinals)
7. (Argentina) Gastón Etlis / (Argentina) Martín Rodríguez (first round)
8. (Australia) Wayne Arthurs / (Australia) Paul Hanley (second round)
9. (Czech Republic) Cyril Suk / (Czech Republic) Pavel Vízner (second round)
10. (Czech Republic) Martin Damm / (United States) Jared Palmer (first round)
11. (Czech Republic) Leoš Friedl / (Czech Republic) František Čermák (first round)
12. (Belgium) Xavier Malisse / (Belgium) Olivier Rochus (second round)
13. (Israel) Jonathan Erlich / (Israel) Andy Ram (second round)
14. (Austria) Julian Knowle / (Czech Republic) Petr Pála (third round)
15. (France) Julien Benneteau / (France) Nicolas Mahut (second round)
16. (Sweden) Simon Aspelin / (Australia) Todd Perry (third round)

== Draw ==
Key

- Q = Qualifier
- WC = Wild card
- LL = Lucky loser
- Alt = Alternate
- ITF = ITF entry
- PR = Protected ranking
- SR = Special ranking
- SE = Special exempt
- JE = Junior exempt
- JR = Junior Accelerator Programme entrant
- CO = College Accelerator Programme entrant
- NG = Next Gen Accelerator Program entrant
- w/o = Walkover
- r = Retired
- d = Defaulted

=== Finals ===
Quarterfinals
(Austria) Jürgen Melzer (Germany) Alexander Waske	7	7
(Czech Republic) Tomáš Berdych (Romania) Andrei Pavel	6^{3}	6^{8}
3	(India) Mahesh Bhupathi (Australia) Todd Woodbridge	6^{3}	3
5	(Zimbabwe) Wayne Black (Zimbabwe) Kevin Ullyett	7	6
6	(France) Michaël Llodra (France) Fabrice Santoro	6^{2}	5
4	(Sweden) Jonas Björkman (Belarus) Max Mirnyi	7	7
(United States) James Blake (United States) Mardy Fish	4	4
2	(United States) Bob Bryan (United States) Mike Bryan	6	6

Semifinals
(Austria) Jürgen Melzer (Germany) Alexander Waske	3	4
5	(Zimbabwe) Wayne Black (Zimbabwe) Kevin Ullyett	6	6
4	(Sweden) Jonas Björkman (Belarus) Max Mirnyi	1	3
2	(United States) Bob Bryan (United States) Mike Bryan	6	6

Final
5	(Zimbabwe) Wayne Black (Zimbabwe) Kevin Ullyett	6	6
2	(United States) Bob Bryan (United States) Mike Bryan	4	4

=== Top half ===
==== Section 1 ====
First round
1	(The Bahamas) M Knowles (Canada) D Nestor	3	6^{5}
(Austria) J Melzer (Germany) A Waske	6	7
(Australia) M Hill (United States) T Phillips	1	1
(Argentina) M García (Argentina) M Hood	6	6
WC	(Australia) P Baccanello (Australia) R Durek	6^{4}	6	4
WC	(Chinese Taipei) Y-h Lu (Japan) T Suzuki	7	2	6
(Italy) G Galimberti (Italy) F Volandri	6	3	7
14	(Austria) J Knowle (Czech Republic) P Pála	4	6	5
9	(Czech Republic) C Suk (Czech Republic) P Vízner	6	6
WC	(Australia) S Kadir (Australia) S Nettle	3	3
(United States) J-M Gambill (United States) K Kim	2	7	4
(Australia) A Fisher (United States) T Parrott	6	6^{3}	6
(Czech Republic) T Berdych (Romania) A Pavel	7	6
(Croatia) I Karlović (Belgium) T Vanhoudt	6^{2}	4
(Czech Republic) T Cibulec (Slovakia) D Hrbatý	2	4
8	(Australia) W Arthurs (Australia) P Hanley	6	6

Second round
(Austria) J Melzer (Germany) A Waske	6	7
(Argentina) M García (Argentina) M Hood	1	5
WC	(Chinese Taipei) Y-h Lu (Japan) T Suzuki	6	6
(Italy) G Galimberti (Italy) F Volandri	3	2
9	(Czech Republic) C Suk (Czech Republic) P Vízner	6^{8}	4
(Australia) A Fisher (United States) T Parrott	7	6
(Czech Republic) T Berdych (Romania) A Pavel	7	7
8	(Australia) W Arthurs (Australia) P Hanley	6^{8}	5

Third round
(Austria) J Melzer (Germany) A Waske	7	7
WC	(Chinese Taipei) Y-h Lu (Japan) T Suzuki	5	6^{3}
(Australia) A Fisher (United States) T Parrott	7	4	3
(Czech Republic) T Berdych (Romania) A Pavel	6^{7}	6	6

Quarterfinals
(Austria) J Melzer (Germany) A Waske	7	7
(Czech Republic) T Berdych (Romania) A Pavel	6^{3}	6^{8}

==== Section 2 ====
First round
3	(India) M Bhupathi (Australia) T Woodbridge	7	7
WC	(Australia) C Guccione (Australia) N Healey	5	5
(Russia) I Andreev (Russia) N Davydenko	6	0	6
WC	(Australia) A Feeney (Australia) M Kimmich	4	6	4
(Spain) A Costa (Spain) R Nadal	6	6
WC	(Australia) D Marafiote (Australia) R Smeets	2	2
(Argentina) A Calleri (Spain) A Martín	3	4
15	(France) J Benneteau (France) N Mahut	6	6
11	(Czech Republic) F Čermák (Czech Republic) L Friedl	6^{4}	3
(Georgia (country)) I Labadze (Netherlands) R Wassen	7	6
(Czech Republic) J Levinský (Czech Republic) D Škoch	2	6	3
(Spain) Á Calatrava (Spain) D Ferrer	6	3	6
(South Africa) C Haggard (South Africa) R Koenig	3	6	6
(United States) J Gimelstob (United States) G Oliver	6	2	3
(Argentina) J Mónaco (Argentina) M Zabaleta	4	1
5	(Zimbabwe) W Black (Zimbabwe) K Ullyett	6	6

Second round
3	(India) M Bhupathi (Australia) T Woodbridge	6	4	6
(Russia) I Andreev (Russia) N Davydenko	4	6	2
(Spain) A Costa (Spain) R Nadal	7	4	6
15	(France) J Benneteau (France) N Mahut	6^{2}	6	2
(Georgia (country)) I Labadze (Netherlands) R Wassen	6	1	4
(Spain) Á Calatrava (Spain) D Ferrer	4	6	6
(South Africa) C Haggard (South Africa) R Koenig	6^{2}	2
5	(Zimbabwe) W Black (Zimbabwe) K Ullyett	7	6

Third round
3	(India) M Bhupathi (Australia) T Woodbridge	4	7	6
(Spain) A Costa (Spain) R Nadal	6	6^{2}	4
(Spain) Á Calatrava (Spain) D Ferrer	6^{2}	2
5	(Zimbabwe) W Black (Zimbabwe) K Ullyett	7	6

Quarterfinals
3	(India) M Bhupathi (Australia) T Woodbridge	6^{3}	3
5	(Zimbabwe) W Black (Zimbabwe) K Ullyett	7	6

=== Bottom half ===
==== Section 3 ====
First round
6	(France) M Llodra (France) F Santoro	6
(Argentina) J Acasuso (Brazil) F Saretta	0	r
(Czech Republic) J Hernych (Czech Republic) M Tabara	6	0	2
(Australia) J Kerr (United States) J Thomas	2	6	6
(South Africa) W Moodie (Serbia and Montenegro) N Zimonjić	6	6
(Spain) F López (Spain) F Verdasco	4	3
(Switzerland) Y Allegro (Germany) M Kohlmann	4	3
12	(Belgium) X Malisse (Belgium) O Rochus	6	6
16	(Sweden) S Aspelin (Australia) T Perry	6	6^{3}	7
(France) J-F Bachelot (France) C Saulnier	1	7	6^{5}
(Spain) JC Ferrero (Spain) S Ventura	6	2	5r
(United States) R Leach (United States) B MacPhie	4	6	3
WC	(Australia) S Huss (Australia) P Luczak	6	5	7
(Brazil) M Melo (Brazil) A Sá	4	7	6^{7}
(Czech Republic) B Ulihrach (Czech Republic) T Zíb	6^{2}	1
4	(Sweden) J Björkman (Belarus) M Mirnyi	7	6

Second round
6	(France) M Llodra (France) F Santoro	6	6
(Australia) J Kerr (United States) J Thomas	4	4
(South Africa) W Moodie (Serbia and Montenegro) N Zimonjić	6	6
12	(Belgium) X Malisse (Belgium) O Rochus	3	4
16	(Sweden) S Aspelin (Australia) T Perry	3	7	6
(United States) R Leach (United States) B MacPhie	6	5	4
WC	(Australia) S Huss (Australia) P Luczak	5	1
4	(Sweden) J Björkman (Belarus) M Mirnyi	7	6

Third round
6	(France) M Llodra (France) F Santoro	6	7
(South Africa) W Moodie (Serbia and Montenegro) N Zimonjić	3	6^{3}
16	(Sweden) S Aspelin (Australia) T Perry	2	6	6^{5}
4	(Sweden) J Björkman (Belarus) M Mirnyi	6	4	7

Quarterfinals
6	(France) M Llodra (France) F Santoro	6^{2}	5
4	(Sweden) J Björkman (Belarus) M Mirnyi	7	7

==== Section 4 ====
First round
7	(Argentina) G Etlis (Argentina) M Rodríguez	4	4
(Argentina) JI Chela (Argentina) S Prieto	6	6
(United States) J Blake (United States) M Fish	6	4	6
(Poland) M Fyrstenberg (Poland) M Matkowski	2	6	1
(Croatia) M Ančić (Croatia) I Ljubičić	4	4
(Germany) K Braasch (South Africa) J Coetzee	6	6
(Slovakia) K Beck (Armenia) S Sargsian	7	6
10	(Czech Republic) M Damm (United States) J Palmer	6^{8}	3
13	(Israel) J Erlich (Israel) A Ram	7	6
(Germany) L Burgsmüller (Germany) P Kohlschreiber	6^{1}	2
(France) A Clément (France) P-H Mathieu	6^{4}	4
(South Korea) H-t Lee (Finland) J Nieminen	7	6
Alt	(Croatia) R Karanušić (Italy) U Vico	7	2
(Germany) R Schüttler (Russia) M Youzhny	6^{4}	1	r
(United States) R Ginepri (United States) V Spadea	2	1
2	(United States) B Bryan (United States) M Bryan	6	6

Second round
(Argentina) JI Chela (Argentina) S Prieto	3	2
(United States) J Blake (United States) M Fish	6	6
(Germany) K Braasch (South Africa) J Coetzee	4	7	5
(Slovakia) K Beck (Armenia) S Sargsian	6	6^{2}	7
13	(Israel) J Erlich (Israel) A Ram	w	/	o
(South Korea) H-t Lee (Finland) J Nieminen
Alt	(Croatia) R Karanušić (Italy) U Vico	0	2
2	(United States) B Bryan (United States) M Bryan	6	6

Third round
(United States) J Blake (United States) M Fish	6	6
(Slovakia) K Beck (Armenia) S Sargsian	3	4
13	(Israel) J Erlich (Israel) A Ram	1	6	6^{8}
2	(United States) B Bryan (United States) M Bryan	6	4	7

Quarterfinals
(United States) J Blake (United States) M Fish	4	4
2	(United States) B Bryan (United States) M Bryan	6	6
