= 2005 Australian Open – Women's singles =

Women's singles
- 2005 Australian Open

Final
- Champion: (United States) Serena Williams
- Runner-up: (United States) Lindsay Davenport
- Score: 2–6, 6–3, 6–0

Details
- Draw: 128 (12Q / 8WC)
- Seeds: 32

Events
Singles	men	women		boys	girls
Doubles	men	women	mixed	boys	girls
WC Singles	men	women	quad
WC Doubles	men	women	quad
Legends	men	women	mixed
- Australian Open

Serena Williams defeated Lindsay Davenport in the final, 2–6, 6–3, 6–0 to win the women's singles tennis title at the 2005 Australian Open. It was her second Australian Open singles title and her seventh major singles title overall. Just as during her first Australian Open title run, Williams saved match points en route to the title, saving three in the semifinals against Maria Sharapova.

Justine Henin-Hardenne was the reigning champion, but did not compete this year due to a knee injury.

This event marked the first major appearances for future world No. 1 and major champion Ana Ivanovic and two-time major champion Li Na. Both reached the third round before losing to Amélie Mauresmo and Sharapova, respectively.

== Seeds ==
1. (United States) Lindsay Davenport (final)
2. (France) Amélie Mauresmo (quarterfinals)
3. (Russia) Anastasia Myskina (fourth round)
4. (Russia) Maria Sharapova (semifinals)
5. (Russia) Svetlana Kuznetsova (quarterfinals)
6. (Russia) Elena Dementieva (fourth round)
7. (United States) Serena Williams (champion)
8. (United States) Venus Williams (fourth round)
9. (Russia) Vera Zvonareva (second round)
10. (Australia) Alicia Molik (quarterfinals)
11. (Russia) Nadia Petrova (fourth round)
12. (Switzerland) Patty Schnyder (quarterfinals)
13. (Croatia) Karolina Šprem (fourth round)
14. (Italy) Francesca Schiavone (third round)
15. (Italy) Silvia Farina Elia (fourth round)
16. (Japan) Ai Sugiyama (first round)
17. (Colombia) Fabiola Zuluaga (second round)
18. (Russia) Elena Likhovtseva (third round)
19. (France) Nathalie Dechy (semifinals)
20. (France) Tatiana Golovin (second round)
21. (United States) Amy Frazier (third round)
22. (Bulgaria) Magdalena Maleeva (third round)
23. (Serbia and Montenegro) Jelena Janković (second round)
24. (France) Mary Pierce (first round)
25. (United States) Lisa Raymond (third Round, withdrew)
26. (Slovakia) Daniela Hantuchová (third round)
27. (Israel) Anna Smashnova (third round)
28. (Japan) Shinobu Asagoe (second round)
29. (Argentina) Gisela Dulko (second round)
30. (Italy) Flavia Pennetta (first round)
31. (Croatia) Jelena Kostanić (second round)
32. (Czech Republic) Iveta Benešová (first round)

== Draw ==
Key

- Q = Qualifier
- WC = Wild card
- LL = Lucky loser
- Alt = Alternate
- ITF = ITF entry
- PR = Protected ranking
- SR = Special ranking
- SE = Special exempt
- JE = Junior exempt
- JR = Junior Accelerator Programme entrant
- CO = College Accelerator Programme entrant
- NG = Next Gen Accelerator Program entrant
- w/o = Walkover
- r = Retired
- d = Defaulted

=== Finals ===
Quarterfinals
1	(United States) Lindsay Davenport	6	4	9
10	(Australia) Alicia Molik	4	6	7
19	(France) Nathalie Dechy	5	6	7
12	(Switzerland) Patty Schnyder	7	1	5
5	(Russia) Svetlana Kuznetsova	6	2	2
4	(Russia) Maria Sharapova	4	6	6
7	(United States) Serena Williams	6	6
2	(France) Amélie Mauresmo	2	2

Semifinals
1	(United States) Lindsay Davenport	2	7^{7}	6
19	(France) Nathalie Dechy	6	6^{5}	4
4	(Russia) Maria Sharapova	6	5	6
7	(United States) Serena Williams	2	7	8

Finals
1	(United States) Lindsay Davenport	6	3	0
7	(United States) Serena Williams	2	6	6

=== Top half ===
==== Section 1 ====
First round
1	(United States) L Davenport	6	6
(Spain) C Martínez	1	0
(Czech Republic) M Paštiková	6	6
(Luxembourg) A Kremer	4	4
(Venezuela) M Vento-Kabchi	7^{7}	4	2
(Czech Republic) N Vaidišová	6^{4}	6	6
WC	(Australia) C Dellacqua	6	2	2
31	(Croatia) J Kostanić	3	6	6
18	(Russia) E Likhovtseva	6	6
(Croatia) S Mamić	3	3
WC	(Australia) E Dominikovic	6^{5}	6	6
(Italy) M Santangelo	7^{7}	4	3
(Germany) M Weingärtner	5	6^{5}
(Italy) T Garbin	7	7^{7}
WC	(Australia) M Adamczak	2	3
13	(Croatia) K Šprem	6	6

Second round
1	(United States) L Davenport	2	6	6
(Czech Republic) M Paštiková	6	2	2
(Czech Republic) N Vaidišová	6	7
31	(Croatia) J Kostanić	0	5
18	(Russia) E Likhovtseva	6	2	6
WC	(Australia) E Dominikovic	3	6	3
(Italy) T Garbin	6^{5}	6^{2}
13	(Croatia) K Šprem	7^{7}	7^{7}

Third round
1	(United States) L Davenport	6	6
(Czech Republic) N Vaidišová	2	4
18	(Russia) E Likhovtseva	4	3
13	(Croatia) K Šprem	6	6

Fourth round
1	(United States) L Davenport	6	6
13	(Croatia) K Šprem	2	2

==== Section 2 ====
First round
10	(Australia) A Molik	6	6
(Spain) A Medina Garrigues	1	3
Q	(United States) A Haynes	3	4
Q	(Japan) A Nakamura	6	6
(Italy) A Serra Zanetti	6	2	1
(Russia) T Panova	4	6	6
(Australia) N Pratt	1	3
23	(Serbia and Montenegro) J Janković	6	6
27	(Israel) A Smashnova	4	6	6
(Spain) M Sánchez Lorenzo	6	0	0
(Czech Republic) B Strýcová	0	2
(Thailand) T Tanasugarn	6	6
(China) S Peng	6	6
(Italy) ME Camerin	1	2
(Greece) E Daniilidou	1	5
8	(United States) V Williams	6	7

Second round
10	(Australia) A Molik	6	6
Q	(Japan) A Nakamura	2	4
(Russia) T Panova	3	6	6
23	(Serbia and Montenegro) J Janković	6	4	2
27	(Israel) A Smashnova	6	6
(Thailand) T Tanasugarn	2	2
(China) S Peng	3	1
8	(United States) V Williams	6	6

Third round
10	(Australia) A Molik	6	6
(Russia) T Panova	3	2
27	(Israel) A Smashnova	3	0
8	(United States) V Williams	6	6

Fourth round
10	(Australia) A Molik	7	7^{7}
8	(United States) V Williams	5	6^{3}

==== Section 3 ====
First round
3	(Russia) A Myskina	6	6
(Czech Republic) K Peschke	1	4
(France) É Loit	6^{11}	4
(Israel) T Obziler	7^{13}	6
Q	(United States) M Tu	3	3
(Czech Republic) K Koukalová	6	6
Q	(Belarus) A Yakimova	0	1
25	(United States) L Raymond	6	6
19	(France) N Dechy	6	6
(Switzerland) E Gagliardi	4	3
(Colombia) C Castaño	2	3
(United States) M Washington	6	6
WC	(France) C Rousseau	6	4	5
(Ukraine) T Perebiynis	1	6	7
(Spain) M Marrero	3	2
14	(Italy) F Schiavone	6	6

Second round
3	(Russia) A Myskina	6	6
(Israel) T Obziler	4	2
(Czech Republic) K Koukalová	0	1
25	(United States) L Raymond	6	6
19	(France) N Dechy	6^{2}	7^{7}	6
(United States) M Washington	7^{7}	6^{2}	2
(Ukraine) T Perebiynis	6	3	0
14	(Italy) F Schiavone	2	6	6

Third round
3	(Russia) A Myskina	w/o
25	(United States) L Raymond
19	(France) N Dechy	6	6
14	(Italy) F Schiavone	3	3

Fourth round
3	(Russia) A Myskina	4	2
19	(France) N Dechy	6	6

==== Section 4 ====
First round
12	(Switzerland) P Schnyder	6	6
(Ukraine) Y Fedak	1	1
(France) S Foretz	2	1
Q	(Netherlands) M Krajicek	6	6
(United States) M Shaughnessy	6	2	2
(United States) A Spears	1	6	6
(Slovakia) Ľ Cervanová	3	5
20	(France) T Golovin	6	7
26	(Slovakia) D Hantuchová	6	7
(Japan) A Morigami	4	5
(Austria) B Schett	6	1	6
WC	(Australia) T Welford	3	6	2
(Russia) A Chakvetadze	6	6
(Spain) A Parra Santonja	3	2
(Ukraine) A Bondarenko	3	3
6	(Russia) E Dementieva	6	6

Second round
12	(Switzerland) P Schnyder	3	6	6
Q	(Netherlands) M Krajicek	6	3	4
(United States) A Spears	7	6
20	(France) T Golovin	5	1
26	(Slovakia) D Hantuchová	6	6
(Austria) B Schett	4	0
(Russia) A Chakvetadze	2	1
6	(Russia) E Dementieva	6	6

Third round
12	(Switzerland) P Schnyder	7^{7}	6
(United States) A Spears	6^{4}	3
26	(Slovakia) D Hantuchová	5	7	4
6	(Russia) E Dementieva	7	5	6

Fourth round
12	(Switzerland) P Schnyder	6^{6}	7^{7}	6
6	(Russia) E Dementieva	7^{8}	6^{4}	2

=== Bottom half ===
==== Section 5 ====
First round
5	(Russia) S Kuznetsova	6	6
Q	(United States) J Kirkland	1	1
(Luxembourg) C Schaul	1	3
(France) M Bartoli	6	6
(Argentina) M Díaz Oliva	6	6
(Japan) S Obata	3	4
(Puerto Rico) K Brandi	3	6	3
29	(Argentina) G Dulko	6	3	6
17	(Colombia) F Zuluaga	6	7
(Tunisia) S Sfar	3	5
(Germany) A-L Grönefeld	6	6
(France) S Beltrame	1	3
(United States) J Craybas	6	6^{2}	4
(Russia) V Dushevina	3	7^{7}	6
Q	(China) N Liu	4	2
9	(Russia) V Zvonareva	6	6

Second round
5	(Russia) S Kuznetsova	6	6
(France) M Bartoli	2	0
(Argentina) M Díaz Oliva	7^{7}	7
29	(Argentina) G Dulko	6^{2}	5
17	(Colombia) F Zuluaga	2	6^{2}
(Germany) A-L Grönefeld	6	7^{7}
(Russia) V Dushevina	6	6
9	(Russia) V Zvonareva	3	3

Third round
5	(Russia) S Kuznetsova	6	7^{7}
(Argentina) M Díaz Oliva	3	6^{5}
(Germany) A-L Grönefeld	5	4
(Russia) V Dushevina	7	6

Fourth round
5	(Russia) S Kuznetsova	6	6
(Russia) V Dushevina	4	2

==== Section 6 ====
First round
15	(Italy) S Farina Elia	6	6
(Germany) J Schruff	3	4
(Poland) M Domachowska	6	3	6
Q	(China) T Li	1	6	0
Q	(United Kingdom) E Baltacha	5	6	6
(Slovenia) K Srebotnik	7	4	4
(France) S Cohen-Aloro	6	6
24	(France) M Pierce	2	2
28	(Japan) S Asagoe	6	6
(Germany) A Barna	4	2
(China) N Li	6	4	6
(United States) L Granville	2	6	2
Q	(Hungary) Z Gubacsi	3	5
(United States) L Lee-Waters	6	7
Q	(Bulgaria) S Karatantcheva	3	1
4	(Russia) M Sharapova	6	6

Second round
15	(Italy) S Farina Elia	6	7^{7}
(Poland) M Domachowska	3	6^{5}
Q	(United Kingdom) E Baltacha	2	6	6
(France) S Cohen-Aloro	6	3	1
28	(Japan) S Asagoe	3	4
(China) N Li	6	6
(United States) L Lee-Waters	6	0	3
4	(Russia) M Sharapova	4	6	6

Third round
15	(Italy) S Farina Elia	6	6
Q	(United Kingdom) E Baltacha	1	0
(China) N Li	0	2
4	(Russia) M Sharapova	6	6

Fourth round
15	(Italy) S Farina Elia	6	1	2
4	(Russia) M Sharapova	4	6	6

==== Section 7 ====
First round
7	(United States) S Williams	6	6
(France) C Pin	1	1
(Madagascar) D Randriantefy	6	6
Q	(Czech Republic) Z Ondrášková	1	1
WC	(India) S Mirza	3	6	6
WC	(Australia) C Watson	6	3	0
(Hungary) P Mandula	3	6	6
30	(Italy) F Pennetta	6	1	3
22	(Bulgaria) M Maleeva	6	6
(Spain) M Serna	1	1
(Spain) V Ruano Pascual	6	1	4
(Russia) A Jidkova	4	6	6
(Spain) N Llagostera Vives	6	6^{6}	4
WC	(Australia) S Ferguson	2	7^{8}	6
(France) V Razzano	1	2
11	(Russia) N Petrova	6	6

Second round
7	(United States) S Williams	6	6
(Madagascar) D Randriantefy	3	0
WC	(India) S Mirza	6	6
(Hungary) P Mandula	2	1
22	(Bulgaria) M Maleeva	6	7
(Russia) A Jidkova	4	5
WC	(Australia) S Ferguson	6	0	1
11	(Russia) N Petrova	4	6	6

Third round
7	(United States) S Williams	6	6
WC	(India) S Mirza	1	4
22	(Bulgaria) M Maleeva	4	4
11	(Russia) N Petrova	6	6

Fourth round
7	(United States) S Williams	6	3	6
11	(Russia) N Petrova	1	6	3

==== Section 8 ====
First round
16	(Japan) A Sugiyama	5	4
(Slovakia) M Suchá	7	6
(Slovakia) Ľ Kurhajcová	4	1
(Russia) E Linetskaia	6	6
(Czech Republic) D Chládková	7^{7}	6
(Croatia) S Talaja	6^{3}	2
(United States) M Irvin	5	1
21	(United States) A Frazier	7	6
32	(Czech Republic) I Benešová	6	6^{4}	4
(Serbia and Montenegro) A Ivanovic	3	7^{7}	6
(Russia) M Kirilenko	5	6	6
(Hungary) A Kapros	7	2	4
(China) J Zheng	5	6	4
(Russia) D Safina	7	3	6
(Australia) S Stosur	2	3
2	(France) A Mauresmo	6	6

Second round
(Slovakia) M Suchá	0	2
(Russia) E Linetskaia	6	6
(Czech Republic) D Chládková	1	6	2
21	(United States) A Frazier	6	3	6
(Serbia and Montenegro) A Ivanovic	6	6
(Russia) M Kirilenko	1	1
(Russia) D Safina	6	1	0
2	(France) A Mauresmo	2	6	6

Third round
(Russia) E Linetskaia	6	6
21	(United States) A Frazier	3	4
(Serbia and Montenegro) A Ivanovic	2	5
2	(France) A Mauresmo	6	7

Fourth round
(Russia) E Linetskaia	2	4
2	(France) A Mauresmo	6	6

== Other entry information ==
=== Wild cards ===
- (Australia) Monique Adamczak
- (Australia) Casey Dellacqua
- (Australia) Evie Dominikovic
- (Australia) Sophie Ferguson
- (India) Sania Mirza
- (France) Capucine Rousseau
- (Australia) Cindy Watson
- (Australia) Tiffany Welford

=== Qualifiers ===
- (United Kingdom) Elena Baltacha
- (Hungary) Zsófia Gubacsi
- (United States) Angela Haynes
- (Bulgaria) Sesil Karatantcheva
- (United States) Jessica Kirkland
- (Netherlands) Michaëlla Krajicek
- (China) Li Ting
- (China) Liu Nannan
- (Japan) Aiko Nakamura
- (Czech Republic) Zuzana Ondrášková
- (United States) Meilen Tu
- (Belarus) Anastasia Yakimova

=== Withdrawals ===
- (Russia) Elena Bovina → replaced by (Croatia) Silvija Talaja
- (United States) Jennifer Capriati → replaced by (Israel) Tzipora Obziler
- (Belgium) Kim Clijsters → replaced by (Colombia) Catalina Castaño
- (Italy) Rita Grande → replaced by (France) Camille Pin
- (Belgium) Justine Henin-Hardenne → replaced by (Ukraine) Alona Bondarenko
- (United States) Shenay Perry → replaced by (Japan) Saori Obata
- (United States) Chanda Rubin → replaced by (Tunisia) Selima Sfar
- (Argentina) Paola Suárez → replaced by (France) Stéphanie Cohen-Aloro

== Championship match statistics ==
Category	(United States) S. Williams	(United States) Davenport
1st serve %	50/84 (60%)	43/68 (63%)
1st serve points won	38 of 50 = 76%	30 of 43 = 70%
2nd serve points won	16 of 34 = 47%	8 of 25 = 32%
Total service points won	54 of 84 = 64.29%	38 of 68 = 55.88%
Aces	12	7
Double faults	5	8
Winners	38	30
Unforced errors	21	25
Net points won	4 of 8 = 50%	7 of 10 = 70%
Break points converted	4 of 8 = 50%	2 of 8 = 25%
Return points won	30 of 68 = 44%	30 of 84 = 36%
Total points won	84	68

Preceded by 2004 US Open – Women's singles	Grand Slam women's singles	Succeeded by 2005 French Open – Women's singles
