= 2005 Australian Open =

- Date: 17–30 January 2005
- Edition: 93rd
- Category: Grand Slam (ITF)
- Surface: Hardcourt (Rebound Ace)
- Location: Melbourne, Australia
- Venue: Melbourne Park

Champions

Men's singles
- (Russia) Marat Safin

Women's singles
- (United States) Serena Williams

Men's doubles
- (Zimbabwe) Wayne Black / (Zimbabwe) Kevin Ullyett

Women's doubles
- (Russia) Svetlana Kuznetsova / (Australia) Alicia Molik

Mixed doubles
- (Australia) Samantha Stosur / (Australia) Scott Draper

Wheelchair men's singles
- (Australia) David Hall

Wheelchair women's singles
- (Japan) Mie Yaosa

Wheelchair men's doubles
- (Netherlands) Robin Ammerlaan / (Austria) Martin Legner

Wheelchair women's doubles
- (Netherlands) Maaike Smit / (France) Florence Gravellier

Boys' singles
- (United States) Donald Young

Girls' singles
- (Belarus) Victoria Azarenka

Boys' doubles
- (South Korea) Kim Sun-yong / (Chinese Taipei) Yi Chu-huan

Girls' doubles
- (Belarus) Victoria Azarenka / (New Zealand) Marina Erakovic

Men's legends doubles
- (Australia) Richard Fromberg / (Sweden) Mats Wilander

Legends mixed doubles
- (Australia) Nicole Bradtke / (Australia) Roy Emerson
- Australian Open

The 2005 Australian Open was a Grand Slam tennis tournament held in Melbourne, Australia from 17 until 30 January 2005. Roger Federer was unsuccessful in defending his 2004 title, being defeated in the semi-finals by eventual champion Marat Safin in a rematch of the 2004 final. Safin defeated third-seed Lleyton Hewitt in the final in four sets. Justine Henin-Hardenne could not defend her 2004 title due to an injury suffered in the second half of 2004. Serena Williams, the champion in 2003, defeated Lindsay Davenport in the women's final. It marked the centenary of the inaugural tournament.

== Seniors ==
=== Men's singles ===
(Russia) Marat Safin defeated (Australia) Lleyton Hewitt, 1–6, 6–3, 6–4, 6–4

- It was Safin's 1st title of the year, and his 15th overall. It was his 2nd career Grand Slam title, his 1st Australian Open title and the last championship of his career. Safin became the second Russian player to win the Australian Open men's singles title, following Yevgeny Kafelnikov's victory in 1999.

=== Women's singles ===
(United States) Serena Williams defeated (United States) Lindsay Davenport, 2–6, 6–3, 6–0

- It was Williams's 1st title of the year, and her 26th overall. It was her 7th career Grand Slam title, and her 2nd Australian Open title. The final featured a long injury time out for Williams in the second set at 3-3.

=== Men's doubles ===
(Zimbabwe) Wayne Black / (Zimbabwe) Kevin Ullyett defeated (United States) Bob Bryan / (United States) Mike Bryan, 6–4, 6–4

=== Women's doubles ===
(Russia) Svetlana Kuznetsova / (Australia) Alicia Molik defeated (United States) Lindsay Davenport / (United States) Corina Morariu, 6–3, 6–4

=== Mixed doubles ===
(Australia) Samantha Stosur / (Australia) Scott Draper defeated (South Africa) Liezel Huber / (Zimbabwe) Kevin Ullyett, 6–2, 2–6, [10–6]

== Juniors ==
=== Boys' singles ===
(United States) Donald Young defeated (South Korea) Kim Sun-yong, 6–2, 6–4

=== Girls' singles ===
(Belarus) Victoria Azarenka defeated (Hungary) Ágnes Szávay, 6–2, 6–2

=== Boys' doubles ===
(South Korea) Kim Sun-yong / (Chinese Taipei) Yi Chu-huan defeated (Netherlands) Thiemo de Bakker / (United States) Donald Young, 6–3, 6–4

=== Girls' doubles ===
(Belarus) Victoria Azarenka / (New Zealand) Marina Erakovic defeated (Czech Republic) Nikola Fraňková / (Hungary) Ágnes Szávay, 6–0, 6–2

== Legends ==
=== Men's doubles ===
- (Australia) Richard Fromberg / (Sweden) Mats Wilander defeated (Australia) Pat Cash / (Australia) Kim Warwick, 6–4, 6–3,

=== Mixed doubles ===
- (Australia) Nicole Bradtke / (Australia) Roy Emerson defeated (Australia) Elizabeth Smylie / (United States) Tony Roche, 7–5, retired

== Wheelchair ==
=== Men's singles ===
(Australia) David Hall defeated (Netherlands) Robin Ammerlaan, 7–5, 3–6, 6–1

=== Women's singles ===
(Japan) Mie Yaosa defeated (Netherlands) Maaike Smit, 7–6(5), 6–1

=== Men's doubles ===
(Netherlands) Robin Ammerlaan / (Austria) Martin Legner defeated (Australia) David Hall / (Australia) Anthony Bonaccurso, 6–4, 6–3

=== Women's doubles ===
(Netherlands) Maaike Smit / (France) Florence Gravellier defeated (Canada) Yuka Chokyu / (Japan) Mie Yaosa, 6–3, 6–3

== Seeds ==
Withdrawals: (Belgium) Justine Henin-Hardenne, (Belgium) Kim Clijsters, (United States) Jennifer Capriati

=== Men's singles ===
1. (Switzerland) Roger Federer (semifinals, lost to Marat Safin)
2. (United States) Andy Roddick (semifinals, lost to Lleyton Hewitt)
3. (Australia) Lleyton lindon Hewitt (final, lost to Marat Safin)
4. (Russia) Marat Safin (champion)
5. (Spain) Carlos Moyá (first round, lost to Guillermo García López)
6. (Argentina) Guillermo Coria (fourth round, lost to David Nalbandian)
7. (United Kingdom) Tim Henman (third round, lost to Nikolay Davydenko)
8. (United States) Andre Agassi (quarterfinals, lost to Roger Federer)
9. (Argentina) David Nalbandian (quarterfinals, lost to Lleyton Hewitt)
10. (Argentina) Gastón Gaudio (third round, lost to Dominik Hrbatý)
11. (Sweden) Joachim Johansson (fourth round, lost to Andre Agassi)
12. (Argentina) Guillermo Cañas (fourth round, lost to Nikolay Davydenko)
13. (Spain) Tommy Robredo (third round, lost to Marcos Baghdatis)
14. (France) Sébastien Grosjean (second round, lost to Jean-René Lisnard)
15. (Russia) Mikhail Youzhny (second round, lost to Rafael Nadal)
16. (Germany) Tommy Haas (second round, lost to Karol Beck)
17. (Romania) Andrei Pavel (second round, lost to Bobby Reynolds)
18. (Chile) Nicolás Massú (second round, retired against Philipp Kohlschreiber)
19. (United States) Vincent Spadea (first round, lost to Radek Štěpánek)
20. (Slovakia) Dominik Hrbatý (quarterfinals, lost to Marat Safin)
21. (Germany) Nicolas Kiefer (first round, lost to Olivier Rochus)
22. (Croatia) Ivan Ljubičić (second round, lost to Marcos Baghdatis)
23. (Chile) Fernando González (third round, lost to David Nalbandian)
24. (Spain) Feliciano López (third round, lost to Joachim Johansson)
25. (Argentina) Juan Ignacio Chela (third round, lost to Lleyton Hewitt)
26. (Russia) Nikolay Davydenko (quarterfinals, retired against Andy Roddick)
27. (Thailand) Paradorn Srichaphan (second round, lost to Jarkko Nieminen)
28. (Croatia) Mario Ančić (third round, lost to Marat Safin)
29. (United States) Taylor Dent (third round, lost to Andre Agassi)
30. (Sweden) Thomas Johansson (fourth round, lost to Dominik Hrbatý)
31. (Spain) Juan Carlos Ferrero (third round, lost to Guillermo Coria)
32. (Austria) Jürgen Melzer (third round, retired against Andy Roddick)

=== Women's singles ===
1. (United States) Lindsay Davenport (final, lost to Serena Williams)
2. (France) Amélie Mauresmo (quarterfinals, lost to Serena Williams)
3. (Russia) Anastasia Myskina (fourth round, lost to Nathalie Dechy)
4. (Russia) Maria Sharapova (semifinals, lost to Serena Williams)
5. (Russia) Svetlana Kuznetsova (quarterfinals, lost to Maria Sharapova)
6. (Russia) Elena Dementieva (fourth round, lost to Patty Schnyder)
7. (United States) Serena Williams (champion)
8. (United States) Venus Williams (fourth round, lost to Alicia Molik)
9. (Russia) Vera Zvonareva (second round, lost to Vera Dushevina)
10. (Australia) Alicia Molik (quarterfinals, lost to Lindsay Davenport)
11. (Russia) Nadia Petrova (fourth round, lost to Serena Williams)
12. (Switzerland) Patty Schnyder (quarterfinals, lost to Nathalie Dechy)
13. (Croatia) Karolina Šprem (fourth round, lost to Lindsay Davenport)
14. (Italy) Francesca Schiavone (third round, lost to Nathalie Dechy)
15. (Italy) Silvia Farina Elia (fourth round, lost to Maria Sharapova)
16. (Japan) Ai Sugiyama (first round, lost to Martina Suchá)
17. (Colombia) Fabiola Zuluaga (second round, lost to Anna-Lena Grönefeld)
18. (Russia) Elena Likhovtseva (third round, lost to Karolina Šprem)
19. (France) Nathalie Dechy (semifinals, lost to Lindsay Davenport)
20. (France) Tatiana Golovin (second round, lost to Abigail Spears)
21. (United States) Amy Frazier (third round, lost to Evgenia Linetskaya)
22. (Bulgaria) Magdalena Maleeva (third round, lost to Nadia Petrova)
23. (Serbia and Montenegro) Jelena Janković (second round, lost to Tatiana Panova)
24. (France) Mary Pierce (first round, lost to Stéphanie Cohen-Aloro)
25. (United States) Lisa Raymond (third round, walkover lost to Anastasia Myskina)
26. (Slovakia) Daniela Hantuchová (third round, lost to Elena Dementieva)
27. (Israel) Anna Smashnova (third round, lost to Venus Williams)
28. (Japan) Shinobu Asagoe (second round, lost to Li Na)
29. (Argentina) Gisela Dulko (second round, lost to Mariana Díaz Oliva)
30. (Italy) Flavia Pennetta (first round, lost to Petra Mandula)
31. (Croatia) Jelena Kostanić Tošić (second round, lost to Nicole Vaidišová)
32. (Czech Republic) Iveta Benešová (first round, lost to Ana Ivanovic)

Preceded by 2004 US Open	Grand Slams	Succeeded by 2005 French Open
