= 2008 Kangaroo Cup – Singles =

Singles
- 2008 Kangaroo Cup

Final
- Champion: (Thailand) Tamarine Tanasugarn
- Runner-up: (Japan) Kimiko Date-Krumm
- Score: 4–6, 7–5, 6–2

Events
Singles	Doubles
← 2007 ·	Kangaroo Cup	· 2009 →

Chan Yung-jan was the defending champion, but decided not to compete that year.

Tamarine Tanasugarn won the title, defeating Kimiko Date-Krumm 4–6, 7–5, 6–2 in the final.

== Seeds ==
1. (Japan) Aiko Nakamura (quarterfinals)
2. (Thailand) Tamarine Tanasugarn (champion)
3. (United Kingdom) Melanie South (semifinals)
4. (Japan) Junri Namigata (first round)
5. (Japan) Rika Fujiwara (first round)
6. (Japan) Kumiko Iijima (second round)
7. (Japan) Akiko Yonemura (quarterfinals)
8. (Netherlands) Nicole Thijssen (first round)

== Draw ==
=== Key ===
- Q = Qualifier
- WC = Wild card
- LL = Lucky loser
- Alt = Alternate
- SE = Special exempt
- PR = Protected ranking
- ITF = ITF entry
- JE = Junior exempt
- w/o = Walkover
- r = Retired
- d = Defaulted
- SR = Special ranking

=== Finals ===
Semifinals
Q	(Japan) Kimiko Date-Krumm	7^{7}	6
3	(United Kingdom) Melanie South	6^{5}	3
Q	(Croatia) Ana Savić	3	1
2	(Thailand) Tamarine Tanasugarn	6	6

Final
Q	(Japan) Kimiko Date-Krumm	6	5	2
2	(Thailand) Tamarine Tanasugarn	4	7	6

=== Top half ===
First round
1	(Japan) A Nakamura	6	6
(Japan) S Hisamatsu	1	0
Q	(Japan) Y Koshino	1	6	3
(Japan) E Takao	6	4	6
WC	(Japan) A Yamasoto	4	6	6
(South Africa) S de Beer	6	4	3
Q	(Japan) K Date-Krumm	2	6	6
5	(Japan) R Fujiwara	6	4	4
3	(United Kingdom) M South	6	6
(China) Y Zhao	2	2
(China) W Liu	5	1
WC	(Japan) Y Kuroda	7	6
(Japan) K Hisami	3	3
(New Zealand) E Barry	6	6
(United States) A Yelsey	6	6^{2}	2
6	(Japan) K Iijima	1	7^{7}	6

Second round
1	(Japan) A Nakamura	6	3	6
(Japan) E Takao	0	6	2
WC	(Japan) A Yamasoto	6^{8}	2
Q	(Japan) K Date-Krumm	7^{10}	6
3	(United Kingdom) M South	6	6
WC	(Japan) Y Kuroda	3	2
(New Zealand) E Barry	7	6
6	(Japan) K Iijima	5	1

Quarterfinals
1	(Japan) A Nakamura	6^{7}	6	3
Q	(Japan) K Date-Krumm	7^{9}	4	6
3	(United Kingdom) M South	3	6	6
(New Zealand) E Barry	6	2	1

Semifinals
Q	(Japan) K Date-Krumm	7^{7}	6
3	(United Kingdom) M South	6^{5}	3

=== Bottom half ===
First round
8	(Netherlands) N Thijssen	3	6^{5}
Q	(Croatia) A Savić	6	7^{7}
WC	(Japan) K Nara	6	6
(Japan) C Okadaue	1	2
(Japan) T Yonemura	6	6
(Japan) M Kato	2	2
(Australia) N Kriz	6	6
4	(Japan) J Namigata	4	4
7	(Japan) A Yonemura	7^{8}	6
(Germany) T Priachin	6^{6}	0
Q	(Russia) K Lykina	6	4	7^{1}
(Australia) A Bai	0	6	6^{1}
(Japan) M Tanaka	6	6
WC	(Japan) K Watanabe	0	1
(France) I Pavlovic	1	2
2	(Thailand) T Tanasugarn	6	6

Second round
Q	(Croatia) A Savić	6	6
WC	(Japan) K Nara	4	3
(Japan) T Yonemura	6	6
(Australia) N Kriz	4	4
7	(Japan) A Yonemura	6	6
Q	(Russia) K Lykina	1	4
(Japan) M Tanaka	1	1
2	(Thailand) T Tanasugarn	6	6

Quarterfinals
Q	(Croatia) A Savić	4	7^{7}	6
(Japan) T Yonemura	6	6^{4}	4
7	(Japan) A Yonemura	6	6^{3}	0
2	(Thailand) T Tanasugarn	4	7^{7}	6

Semifinals
Q	(Croatia) A Savić	3	1
2	(Thailand) T Tanasugarn	6	6
