= 2005 Australian Open – Girls' doubles =

Girls' doubles
- 2005 Australian Open

Final
- Champion: (Belarus) Victoria Azarenka (New Zealand) Marina Erakovic
- Runner-up: (Czech Republic) Nikola Fraňková (Hungary) Ágnes Szávay
- Score: 6–0, 6–2

Events
Singles	men	women		boys	girls
Doubles	men	women	mixed	boys	girls
WC Singles	men	women	quad
WC Doubles	men	women	quad
Legends	men	women	mixed
- Australian Open

Victoria Azarenka and Marina Erakovic won the title by defeating Nikola Fraňková and Ágnes Szávay 6–0, 6–2 in the final.

== Seeds ==
1. (Switzerland) Timea Bacsinszky / (Germany) Angelique Kerber (quarterfinals)
2. (Belarus) Victoria Azarenka / (New Zealand) Marina Erakovic (champions)
3. (Denmark) Caroline Wozniacki / (Canada) Aleksandra Wozniak (second round)
4. (Chinese Taipei) Yung-Jan Chan / (Russia) Alisa Kleybanova (quarterfinals)
5. (Slovakia) Dominika Cibulková / (Slovakia) Magdaléna Rybáriková (first round)
6. (Czech Republic) Nikola Fraňková / (Hungary) Ágnes Szávay (final)
7. (Romania) Sorana Cîrstea / (Romania) Monica Niculescu (quarterfinals)
8. (Chinese Taipei) Wen-Hsin Hsu / (Chinese Taipei) I-Hsuan Hwang (semifinals)

== Draw ==
Key

- Q = Qualifier
- WC = Wild card
- LL = Lucky loser
- Alt = Alternate
- ITF = ITF entry
- PR = Protected ranking
- SR = Special ranking
- SE = Special exempt
- JE = Junior exempt
- JR = Junior Accelerator Programme entrant
- CO = College Accelerator Programme entrant
- NG = Next Gen Accelerator Program entrant
- w/o = Walkover
- r = Retired
- d = Defaulted

=== Finals ===
Semifinals
6	(Czech Republic) Nikola Fraňková (Hungary) Ágnes Szávay	6	6
8	(Chinese Taipei) Wen-Hsin Hsu (Chinese Taipei) I-Hsuan Hwang	3	1
(Australia) Daniella Dominikovic (Australia) Olivia Lukaszewicz	1	1
2	(Belarus) Victoria Azarenka (New Zealand) Marina Erakovic	6	6

Final
6	(Czech Republic) Nikola Fraňková (Hungary) Ágnes Szávay	0	2
2	(Belarus) Victoria Azarenka (New Zealand) Marina Erakovic	6	6

=== Top half ===
First round
1	(Switzerland) Timea Bacsinszky (Germany) Angelique Kerber	6	6
WC	(Australia) Jessica Moore (Australia) Lia Tapper	0	1
(India) Punam Reddy (Japan) Erika Sema	1	1
(United States) Alexa Glatch (Russia) Ekaterina Kosminskaya	6	6
WC	(Australia) Bridget Healy (South Africa) Megan Price	6	6
(United States) Elizabeth Kobak (Italy) Stella Menna	3	4
(Czech Republic) Barbora Hodinarova (Netherlands) Nicole Thyssen	2	2
6	(Czech Republic) Nikola Fraňková (Hungary) Ágnes Szávay	6	6
4	(Chinese Taipei) Yung-Jan Chan (Russia) Alisa Kleybanova	6	6
(Australia) Michelle Brycki (Australia) Shayna McDowell	4	1
(France) Irena Pavlovic (Germany) Andrea Petkovic	6	3	6
(Czech Republic) Kateřina Kramperová (Austria) Tamira Paszek	3	6	3
(Sweden) Michaela Johansson (Sweden) Nadja Roma	4	6	3
(New Zealand) Ellen Barry (Russia) Anastasia Poltoratskaya	6	3	6
(Croatia) Josipa Bek (Croatia) Mirna Marinovic	5	6	4
8	(Chinese Taipei) Wen-Hsin Hsu (Chinese Taipei) I-Hsuan Hwang	7	4	6

Second round
1	(Switzerland) T Bacsinszky (Germany) A Kerber	6	6
(United States) A Glatch (Russia) E Kosminskaya	4	2
WC	(Australia) B Healy (South Africa) M Price	0	2
6	(Czech Republic) N Fraňková (Hungary) Á Szávay	6	6
4	(Chinese Taipei) Y-J Chan (Russia) A Kleybanova	6	6
(France) I Pavlovic (Germany) A Petkovic	1	4
(New Zealand) E Barry (Russia) A Poltoratskaya	1	6	2
8	(Chinese Taipei) W-H Hsu (Chinese Taipei) I-H Hwang	6	3	6

Quarterfinals
1	(Switzerland) T Bacsinszky (Germany) A Kerber	3	0
6	(Czech Republic) N Fraňková (Hungary) Á Szávay	6	6
4	(Chinese Taipei) Y-J Chan (Russia) A Kleybanova	3	6	4
8	(Chinese Taipei) W-H Hsu (Chinese Taipei) I-H Hwang	6	4	6

Semifinals
6	(Czech Republic) N Fraňková (Hungary) Á Szávay	6	6
8	(Chinese Taipei) W-H Hsu (Chinese Taipei) I-H Hwang	3	1

=== Bottom half ===
First round
5	(Slovakia) Dominika Cibulková (Slovakia) Magdaléna Rybáriková	2	3
(United States) Jennifer-Lee Heinser (United States) Elizabeth Plotkin	6	6
(Italy) Sara Errani (Romania) Ágnes Szatmári	6	3	3
(Australia) Jessica Engels (Australia) Bianca Smith	1	6	6
(Australia) Daniella Dominikovic (Australia) Olivia Lukaszewicz	6	6
(Australia) Johanna Konta (Australia) Karolina Wlodarczak	4	2
(Australia) Alenka Hubacek (Australia) Therese Tisseverasinghe	0	2
3	(Denmark) Caroline Wozniacki (Canada) Aleksandra Wozniak	6	6
7	(Romania) Sorana Cîrstea (Romania) Monica Niculescu	6	6
(Canada) Ekaterina Shulaeva (Canada) Valérie Tétreault	3	1
WC	(Australia) Tyra Calderwood (Australia) Jenny Swift	6	7
(United Kingdom) Francesca Kinsella (Australia) Ewa Losinski	0	5
(South Korea) Ye-Ra Lee (Japan) Ayumi Morita	6	6
WC	(Australia) Marija Mirkovic (Australia) Kristina Pejkovic	3	2
(New Zealand) Shona Lee (Thailand) Pichittra Thongdach	2	2
2	(Belarus) Victoria Azarenka (New Zealand) Marina Erakovic	6	6

Second round
(United States) J-L Heinser (United States) E Plotkin	6	4	4
(Australia) J Engels (Australia) B Smith	4	6	6
(Australia) D Dominikovic (Australia) O Lukaszewicz	7^{7}	6
3	(Denmark) C Wozniacki (Canada) A Wozniak	6^{5}	4
7	(Romania) S Cîrstea (Romania) M Niculescu	6	6
WC	(Australia) T Calderwood (Australia) J Swift	2	0
(South Korea) Y-R Lee (Japan) A Morita	2	3
2	(Belarus) V Azarenka (New Zealand) M Erakovic	6	6

Quarterfinals
(Australia) J Engels (Australia) B Smith	6^{5}	6	2
(Australia) D Dominikovic (Australia) O Lukaszewicz	7^{7}	3	6
7	(Romania) S Cîrstea (Romania) M Niculescu	2	6	4
2	(Belarus) V Azarenka (New Zealand) M Erakovic	6	3	6

Semifinals
(Australia) D Dominikovic (Australia) O Lukaszewicz	1	1
2	(Belarus) V Azarenka (New Zealand) M Erakovic	6	6

== Sources ==
- Draw
