= 2008 Kangaroo Cup – Doubles =

Doubles
- 2008 Kangaroo Cup

Final
- Champions: (Japan) Kimiko Date-Krumm (Japan) Kurumi Nara
- Runners-up: (United Kingdom) Melanie South (Netherlands) Nicole Thijssen
- Score: 6–1, 6–7^{(8–10)}, [10–7]

Events
Singles	Doubles
← 2007 ·	Kangaroo Cup	· 2009 →

Ayumi Morita and Ai Sugiyama were the defending champions, but neither player chose to compete that year.

Kimiko Date-Krumm and Kurumi Nara won the title, defeating Melanie South and Nicole Thijssen 6–1, 6–7^{(8–10)}, [10–7] in the final.

== Seeds ==
1. (Japan) Junri Namigata / (Japan) Akiko Yonemura (quarterfinals)
2. (South Africa) Surina De Beer / (Japan) Kumiko Iijima (quarterfinals, withdrew)
3. (United Kingdom) Melanie South / (Netherlands) Nicole Thijssen (final)
4. (China) Liu Wanting / (China) Zhao Yijing (quarterfinals)

== Draw ==
=== Key ===
- Q = Qualifier
- WC = Wild card
- LL = Lucky loser
- Alt = Alternate
- SE = Special exempt
- PR = Protected ranking
- ITF = ITF entry
- JE = Junior exempt
- w/o = Walkover
- r = Retired
- d = Defaulted
- SR = Special ranking

=== Draw ===
First round
1	(Japan) J Namigata (Japan) A Yonemura	6	7^{7}
(Australia) A Hubacek (Australia) J Moriarty	2	6^{5}
Q	(Japan) M Doi (Japan) K Hisami	4	2
WC	(Japan) K Date-Krumm (Japan) K Nara	6	6
4	(China) W Liu (China) Y Zhao	6	6
(Japan) S Hisamatsu (Japan) T Yonemura	2	3
(Japan) M Kato (Japan) Y Nakano	6	4	[6]
(Australia) A Bai (Australia) N Kriz	4	6	[10]
WC	(Japan) Y Adachi (Japan) K Watanabe	3	2
(Japan) T Dokei (Japan) Y Kurata	6	6
Q	(Japan) Y Kuroda (Russia) K Lykina	4	2
3	(United Kingdom) M South (Netherlands) N Thijssen	6	6
WC	(Japan) Mi Inoue (Japan) A Tajima	6^{5}	2
(Japan) Ma Inoue (Japan) S Shimizu	7^{7}	6
(New Zealand) E Barry (United States) A Yelsey	4	6	[7]
2	(South Africa) S De Beer (Japan) K Iijima	6	4	[10]

Quarterfinals
1	(Japan) J Namigata (Japan) A Yonemura	6	6^{2}	[9]
WC	(Japan) K Date-Krumm (Japan) K Nara	3	7^{7}	[11]
4	(China) W Liu (China) Y Zhao	6	2	[5]
(Australia) A Bai (Australia) N Kriz	2	6	[10]
(Japan) T Dokei (Japan) Y Kurata	2	3
3	(United Kingdom) M South (Netherlands) N Thijssen	6	6
(Japan) Ma Inoue (Japan) S Shimizu	w/o
2	(South Africa) S De Beer (Japan) K Iijima

Semifinals
WC	(Japan) K Date-Krumm (Japan) K Nara	6	5	[10]
(Australia) A Bai (Australia) N Kriz	4	7	[6]
3	(United Kingdom) M South (Netherlands) N Thijssen	6	6
(Japan) Ma Inoue (Japan) S Shimizu	1	0

Final
WC	(Japan) K Date-Krumm (Japan) K Nara	6	6^{8}	[10]
3	(United Kingdom) M South (Netherlands) N Thijssen	1	7^{10}	[7]
