= 2008 Kangaroo Cup =

- Date: 28 April – 4 May
- Edition: 12th
- Surface: Carpet / Outdoor
- Location: Gifu, Japan

Champions

Singles
- (Thailand) Tamarine Tanasugarn

Doubles
- (Japan) Kimiko Date-Krumm / (Japan) Kurumi Nara
← 2007 ·	Kangaroo Cup	· 2009 →

The 2008 Kangaroo Cup was a professional tennis tournament played on outdoor carpet courts. It was the twelfth edition of the tournament which was part of the 2008 ITF Women's Circuit. It took place in Gifu, Japan between 28 April and 4 May 2008. The total prize money offered at this event was US$50,000.

This tournament marked the return of Japanese player Kimiko Date-Krumm, who returned to professional tennis almost 12 years after retiring, at the age of 37. Date entered the qualifying with the help of a wildcard, and she not only qualified, but had a run to the singles final, where she was beaten by Tamarine Tanasugarn. She also won the doubles title here, with compatriot Kurumi Nara.

== WTA entrants ==
=== Seeds ===
Country	Player	Rank^{1}	Seed
JPN	Aiko Nakamura	80	1
THA	Tamarine Tanasugarn	86	2
GBR	Melanie South	159	3
JPN	Junri Namigata	180	4
JPN	Rika Fujiwara	183	5
JPN	Kumiko Iijima	210	6
JPN	Akiko Yonemura	220	7
NED	Nicole Thijssen	222	8

- ^{1} Rankings are as of April 21, 2008.

=== Other entrants ===
The following players received wildcards into the singles main draw:

- (Japan) Yuka Kuroda
- (Japan) Kurumi Nara
- (Japan) Kana Watanabe
- (Japan) Aki Yamasoto

The following players received entry from the qualifying draw:

- (Japan) Kimiko Date-Krumm
- (Japan) Yurina Koshino
- (Russia) Ksenia Lykina
- (Croatia) Ana Savić

== Champions ==
=== Singles ===
- (Thailand) Tamarine Tanasugarn def. (Japan) Kimiko Date-Krumm, 4–6, 7–5, 6–2

=== Doubles ===
- (Japan) Kimiko Date-Krumm / (Japan) Kurumi Nara def. (United Kingdom) Melanie South / (Netherlands) Nicole Thijssen, 6–1, 6–7^{(8–10)}, [10–7]
