= 2005 Australian Open – Girls' singles =

Girls' singles
- 2005 Australian Open

Final
- Champion: (Belarus) Victoria Azarenka
- Runner-up: (Hungary) Ágnes Szávay
- Score: 6–2, 6–2

Events
Singles	men	women		boys	girls
Doubles	men	women	mixed	boys	girls
WC Singles	men	women	quad
WC Doubles	men	women	quad
Legends	men	women	mixed
- Australian Open

Victoria Azarenka won the title, defeating Ágnes Szávay in the final, 6–2, 6–2. Azarenka would go on to win the women's title in 2012 and 2013.

Shahar Pe'er was the defending champion, but chose to participate in the women's qualifying competition, where she lost to top seed Sesil Karatantcheva in the final round.

== Seeds ==
1. (Belarus) Victoria Azarenka (champion)
2. (Switzerland) Timea Bacsinszky (semifinals)
3. (Germany) Angelique Kerber (first round)
4. (Ukraine) Olga Savchuk (third round)
5. (Chinese Taipei) Yung-Jan Chan (third round)
6. (Canada) Aleksandra Wozniak (semifinals)
7. (Romania) Monica Niculescu (quarterfinals)
8. (Slovakia) Dominika Cibulková (third round)
9. (New Zealand) Marina Erakovic (quarterfinals)
10. (Chinese Taipei) Wen-Hsin Hsu (third round)
11. (Denmark) Caroline Wozniacki (third round)
12. (Hungary) Ágnes Szávay (final)
13. (Russia) Alisa Kleybanova (third round)
14. (Slovakia) Magdaléna Rybáriková (first round)
15. (United States) Jennifer-Lee Heinser (second round)
16. (Thailand) Pichittra Thongdach (first round)

== Draw ==
Key

- Q = Qualifier
- WC = Wild card
- LL = Lucky loser
- Alt = Alternate
- ITF = ITF entry
- PR = Protected ranking
- SR = Special ranking
- SE = Special exempt
- JE = Junior exempt
- JR = Junior Accelerator Programme entrant
- CO = College Accelerator Programme entrant
- NG = Next Gen Accelerator Program entrant
- w/o = Walkover
- r = Retired
- d = Defaulted

=== Finals ===
Quarterfinals
1	(Belarus) Victoria Azarenka	6	6
9	(New Zealand) Marina Erakovic	1	3
Q	(Italy) Sara Errani	1	3
6	(Canada) Aleksandra Wozniak	6	6
12	(Hungary) Ágnes Szávay	6	6
(Austria) Tamira Paszek	3	3
7	(Romania) Monica Niculescu	6^{3}	4
2	(Switzerland) Timea Bacsinszky	7^{7}	6

Semifinals
1	(Belarus) Victoria Azarenka	6	6
6	(Canada) Aleksandra Wozniak	0	4
12	(Hungary) Ágnes Szávay	6	6
2	(Switzerland) Timea Bacsinszky	2	2

Final
1	(Belarus) Victoria Azarenka	6	6
12	(Hungary) Ágnes Szávay	2	2

=== Top half ===
==== Section 1 ====
First round
1	(Belarus) Victoria Azarenka	6	6
(Canada) Ekaterina Shulaeva	2	1
Q	(Australia) Alison Bai	1	4
WC	(Australia) Olivia Lukaszewicz	6	6
(Romania) Sorana Cîrstea	7	4	6
(India) Punam Reddy	5	6	4
(South Korea) Ye-Ra Lee	6	1	1
13	(Russia) Alisa Kleybanova	4	6	6
9	(New Zealand) Marina Erakovic	6	6
(United States) Elizabeth Plotkin	4	3
(Australia) Michelle Brycki	6	6
WC	(South Africa) Megan Price	0	2
(France) Irena Pavlovic	6	6
LL	(Thailand) Porntip Mulsap	0	4
(Sweden) Nadja Roma	1	3
5	(Chinese Taipei) Yung-Jan Chan	6	6

Second round
1	(Belarus) V Azarenka	6	6
WC	(Australia) O Lukaszewicz	2	1
(Romania) S Cîrstea	3	5
13	(Russia) A Kleybanova	6	7
9	(New Zealand) M Erakovic	7	6
(Australia) M Brycki	5	4
(France) I Pavlovic	6^{5}	3
5	(Chinese Taipei) Y-J Chan	7^{7}	6

Third round
1	(Belarus) V Azarenka	6	6
13	(Russia) A Kleybanova	1	1
9	(New Zealand) M Erakovic	6	6
5	(Chinese Taipei) Y-J Chan	3	4

Quarterfinals
1	(Belarus) V Azarenka	6	6
9	(New Zealand) M Erakovic	1	3

==== Section 2 ====
First round
3	(Germany) Angelique Kerber	4	6	4
(United States) Alexa Glatch	6	3	6
Q	(Italy) Sara Errani	6	6
(Australia) Daniella Dominikovic	2	1
Q	(Australia) Therese Tisseverasinghe	6	3	8
(Thailand) Nudnida Luangnam	3	6	6
(Japan) Ayumi Morita	2	6	6
14	(Slovakia) Magdaléna Rybáriková	6	2	4
11	(Denmark) Caroline Wozniacki	6	6
(Netherlands) Nicole Thyssen	2	2
(Czech Republic) Kateřina Kramperová	2	6^{1}
(Romania) Ágnes Szatmári	6	7^{7}
(New Zealand) Shona Lee	3	1
(Chinese Taipei) I-Hsuan Hwang	6	6
WC	(Australia) Jessica Moore	2	1
6	(Canada) Aleksandra Wozniak	6	6

Second round
(United States) A Glatch	3	3
Q	(Italy) S Errani	6	6
Q	(Australia) T Tisseverasinghe	3	2
(Japan) A Morita	6	6
11	(Denmark) C Wozniacki	6	5	6
(Romania) Á Szatmári	3	7	2
(Chinese Taipei) I-H Hwang	1	1
6	(Canada) A Wozniak	6	6

Third round
Q	(Italy) S Errani	6	6
(Japan) A Morita	2	1
11	(Denmark) C Wozniacki	6	6^{7}	1
6	(Canada) A Wozniak	1	7^{9}	6

Quarterfinals
Q	(Italy) S Errani	1	3
6	(Canada) A Wozniak	6	6

=== Bottom half ===
==== Section 3 ====
First round
8	(Slovakia) Dominika Cibulková	6	6
(Japan) Erika Sema	1	1
(United States) Elizabeth Kobak	5	1
(Russia) Ekaterina Kosminskaya	7	6
(Croatia) Mirna Marinovic	3	4
(Czech Republic) Nikola Fraňková	6	6
Q	(Australia) Jessica Engels	7	1	1
12	(Hungary) Ágnes Szávay	5	6	6
16	(Thailand) Pichittra Thongdach	1	4
(New Zealand) Ellen Barry	6	6
Q	(Australia) Holly Cao	1	1
(Austria) Tamira Paszek	6	6
WC	(Australia) Lia Tapper	6	3	2
Q	(Australia) Karolina Wlodarczak	3	6	6
(Sweden) Michaela Johansson	2	3
4	(Ukraine) Olga Savchuk	6	6

Second round
8	(Slovakia) D Cibulková	6	6
(Russia) E Kosminskaya	2	2
(Czech Republic) N Fraňková	0	7	4
12	(Hungary) Á Szávay	6	5	6
(New Zealand) E Barry	6	1	2
(Austria) T Paszek	4	6	6
Q	(Australia) K Wlodarczak	1	3
4	(Ukraine) O Savchuk	6	6

Third round
8	(Slovakia) D Cibulková	2	1
12	(Hungary) Á Szávay	6	6
(Austria) T Paszek	6	6
4	(Ukraine) O Savchuk	3	2

Quarterfinals
12	(Hungary) Á Szávay	6	6
(Austria) T Paszek	3	3

==== Section 4 ====
First round
7	(Romania) Monica Niculescu	7	6
(Australia) Shayna McDowell	5	4
(Czech Republic) Barbora Hodinarova	6	3	0
Q	(United Kingdom) Francesca Kinsella	4	6	6
WC	(Australia) Bridget Healy	4	2
(Russia) Anastasia Poltoratskaya	6	6
(Croatia) Josipa Bek	1	3
10	(Chinese Taipei) Wen-Hsin Hsu	6	6
15	(United States) Jennifer-Lee Heinser	6	6
Q	(Italy) Stella Menna	0	1
WC	(Australia) Tammi Patterson	3	3
(Canada) Valérie Tétreault	6	6
WC	(Australia) Jenny Swift	3	2
WC	(Australia) Tyra Calderwood	6	6
(Germany) Andrea Petkovic	2	2
2	(Switzerland) Timea Bacsinszky	6	6

Second round
7	(Romania) M Niculescu	6	6
Q	(United Kingdom) F Kinsella	2	2
(Russia) A Poltoratskaya	4	2
10	(Chinese Taipei) W-H Hsu	6	6
15	(United States) J-L Heinser	5	5
(Canada) V Tétreault	7	7
WC	(Australia) T Calderwood	0	1
2	(Switzerland) T Bacsinszky	6	6

Third round
7	(Romania) M Niculescu	6	3	6
10	(Chinese Taipei) W-H Hsu	1	6	1
(Canada) V Tétreault	6	6^{6}	1
2	(Switzerland) T Bacsinszky	4	7^{8}	6

Quarterfinals
7	(Romania) M Niculescu	6^{3}	4
2	(Switzerland) T Bacsinszky	7^{7}	6

== Sources ==
- Draw
