= 2014 Citi Open =

- Date: July 26 – August 3
- Edition: 46th (men) / 4th (women)
- Category: ATP World Tour 500 (men); WTA International (women)
- Surface: Hard / outdoor
- Location: Washington, D.C., United States
- Venue: William H.G. FitzGerald Tennis Center

Champions

Men's singles
- (Canada) Milos Raonic

Women's singles
- (Russia) Svetlana Kuznetsova

Men's doubles
- (Netherlands) Jean-Julien Rojer / (Romania) Horia Tecău

Women's doubles
- (Japan) Shuko Aoyama / (Canada) Gabriela Dabrowski
- Washington Open

The 2014 Citi Open (known as such for sponsorship reasons) was a tennis tournament played on outdoor hard courts. It was the 46th edition (for the men) and the 4th edition (for the women) of the event known this year as the Citi Open, and was part of the ATP World Tour 500 series of the 2014 ATP World Tour, and of the WTA International tournaments of the 2014 WTA Tour. It took place at the William H.G. FitzGerald Tennis Center in Washington, D.C., United States, from July 26 to August 3, 2014. Milos Raonic and Svetlana Kuznetsova won the singles titles.

== Finals ==
=== Men's singles ===
- (Canada) Milos Raonic defeated (Canada) Vasek Pospisil, 6–1, 6–4

=== Women's singles ===
- (Russia) Svetlana Kuznetsova defeated (Japan) Kurumi Nara, 6–3, 4–6, 6–4

=== Men's doubles ===
- (Netherlands) Jean-Julien Rojer / (Romania) Horia Tecău defeated (Australia) Sam Groth / (India) Leander Paes, 7–5, 6–4

=== Women's doubles ===
- (Japan) Shuko Aoyama / (Canada) Gabriela Dabrowski defeated (Japan) Hiroko Kuwata / (Japan) Kurumi Nara, 6–1, 6–2

== Points and prize money ==
=== Point distribution ===
Event	W	F	SF	QF	Round of 16	Round of 32	Round of 64	Q	Q2	Q1
Men's singles	500	300	180	90	45	20	0	10	4	0
Men's doubles	500	300	180	90	—N/a	—N/a	0	10	—N/a	0
Women's singles	280	180	110	60	30	1	—N/a	18	12	1
Women's doubles	280	180	110	60	1	—N/a	—N/a	—N/a	—N/a	—N/a

=== Prize money ===
Event	W	F	SF	QF	Round of 16	Round of 32	Round of 64^{1}	Q2	Q1
Men's singles	$316,400	$142,650	$67,570	$32,605	$16,625	$9,150	$5,325	$850	$440
Men's doubles *	$93,460	$42,180	$19,890	$9,610	$4,920	—N/a	—N/a	—N/a	—N/a
Women's singles	$43,000	$21,400	$11,300	$6,200	$3,420	$2,220	—N/a	$1,285	$750
Women's doubles *	$12,300	$6,400	$3,435	$1,820	$960	—N/a	—N/a	—N/a	—N/a

_{^{1} Qualifiers prize money is also the Round of 64 prize money}
_{* per team}

== ATP singles main-draw entrants ==
=== Seeds ===
Country	Player	Rank^{1}	Seed
CZE	Tomáš Berdych	5	1
CAN	Milos Raonic	7	2
~~BUL~~	~~Grigor Dimitrov~~	~~9~~	~~3~~
JPN	Kei Nishikori	10	4
USA	John Isner	12	5
FRA	Richard Gasquet	14	6
RSA	Kevin Anderson	17	7
ESP	Feliciano López	24	8
CRO	Ivo Karlović	31	9
COL	Santiago Giraldo	33	10
CZE	Radek Štěpánek	34	11
FRA	Jérémy Chardy	37	12
CAN	Vasek Pospisil	39	13
AUS	Lleyton Hewitt	40	14
UZB	Denis Istomin	41	15
TPE	Lu Yen-hsun	42	16
FRA	Julien Benneteau	46	17

- ^{1} Rankings are as of July 21, 2014

=== Other entrants ===
The following players received wild cards into the main singles draw:

- (Czech Republic) Tomáš Berdych
- (Australia) James Duckworth
- (Canada) Filip Peliwo
- (United States) Francis Tiafoe

The following players received entry from the singles qualifying draw:

- (United States) Jared Donaldson
- (United States) Robby Ginepri
- (United States) Alex Kuznetsov
- (Ukraine) Illya Marchenko
- (United States) Rajeev Ram
- (Japan) Yūichi Sugita

The following player received entry as a lucky loser:

- (Australia) Sam Groth

=== Withdrawals ===
Before the tournament

- (Bulgaria) Grigor Dimitrov → replaced by (Australia) Sam Groth
- (Croatia) Ivan Dodig → replaced by (United States) Tim Smyczek
- (Australia) Matthew Ebden → replaced by (Tunisia) Malek Jaziri
- (United States) Bradley Klahn → replaced by (Germany) Michael Berrer
- (France) Gaël Monfils (knee injury) → replaced by (Israel) Dudi Sela
- (Russia) Dmitry Tursunov → replaced by (Canada) Frank Dancevic

== ATP doubles main-draw entrants ==
=== Seeds ===
Country	Player	Country	Player	Rank^{1}	Seed
USA	Bob Bryan	USA	Mike Bryan	2	1
AUT	Alexander Peya	BRA	Bruno Soares	6	2
CAN	Daniel Nestor	SRB	Nenad Zimonjić	11	3
CRO	Ivan Dodig	BRA	Marcelo Melo	17	4

- ^{1} Rankings are as of July 21, 2014

=== Other entrants ===
The following pairs received wildcards into the doubles main draw:

- (United States) Jared Donaldson / (United States) Stefan Kozlov
- (United States) Steve Johnson / (United States) Sam Querrey

The following pair received entry from the doubles qualifying draw:

- (Israel) Jonathan Erlich / (United States) Rajeev Ram

== WTA singles main-draw entrants ==
=== Seeds ===
Country	Player	Rank ^{1}	Seed
CZE	Lucie Šafářová	17	1
RUS	Ekaterina Makarova	20	2
FRA	Alizé Cornet	21	3
USA	Sloane Stephens	22	4
RUS	Anastasia Pavlyuchenkova	24	5
RUS	Svetlana Kuznetsova	26	6
USA	Madison Keys	27	7
ROU	Sorana Cîrstea	29	8

- ^{1} Rankings are as of July 21, 2014

=== Other entrants ===
The following players received wild cards into the main singles draw:

- (Canada) Françoise Abanda
- (United States) Shelby Rogers

The following players received entry from the singles qualifying draw:

- (United States) Tornado Alicia Black
- (Japan) Hiroko Kuwata
- (Australia) Olivia Rogowska
- (United States) Taylor Townsend

=== Withdrawals ===
Before the tournament

- (Canada) Eugenie Bouchard → replaced by (Netherlands) Kiki Bertens
- (Slovakia) Jana Čepelová → replaced by (United States) Vania King
- (Romania) Monica Niculescu → replaced by (France) Virginie Razzano

During the tournament

- (United States) Vania King (right hip injury)

=== Retirements ===
- (Kazakhstan) Zarina Diyas

== WTA doubles main-draw entrants ==
=== Seeds ===
Country	Player	Country	Player	Rank^{1}	Seed
ZIM	Cara Black	IND	Sania Mirza	15	1
JPN	Shuko Aoyama	CAN	Gabriela Dabrowski	129	2
USA	Vania King	USA	Taylor Townsend	183	3
AUS	Arina Rodionova	AUS	Olivia Rogowska	196	4

- ^{1} Rankings are as of July 21, 2014

=== Other entrants ===
The following pair received a wildcard into the doubles main draw:

- (United States) Roxanne Ellison / (United States) Sierra Ellison

=== Withdrawals ===
During the tournament

- (United States) Vania King (right hip injury)
