= 2014 Citi Open – Women's doubles =

Women's doubles
- 2014 Citi Open

Final
- Champions: (Japan) Shuko Aoyama (Canada) Gabriela Dabrowski
- Runners-up: (Japan) Hiroko Kuwata (Japan) Kurumi Nara
- Score: 6–1, 6–2

Details
- Draw: 14
- Seeds: 4

Events
Singles	men	women
Doubles	men	women
- Citi Open

Shuko Aoyama and Vera Dushevina were the defending champions in the Women's doubles of the 2014 Citi Open tennis tournament, but Dushevina chose not to participate. Aoyama successfully defended the title alongside Gabriela Dabrowski, defeating Hiroko Kuwata and Kurumi Nara in the final, 6–1, 6–2.

== Seeds ==
1. (Zimbabwe) Cara Black / (India) Sania Mirza (quarterfinals)
2. (Japan) Shuko Aoyama / (Canada) Gabriela Dabrowski (champions)
3. (United States) Vania King / (United States) Taylor Townsend (quarterfinals, withdrew)
4. (Australia) Arina Rodionova / (Australia) Olivia Rogowska (quarterfinals)

== Draw ==
Key

- Q = Qualifier
- WC = Wild card
- LL = Lucky loser
- Alt = Alternate
- ITF = ITF entry
- PR = Protected ranking
- SR = Special ranking
- SE = Special exempt
- JE = Junior exempt
- JR = Junior Accelerator Programme entrant
- CO = College Accelerator Programme entrant
- NG = Next Gen Accelerator Program entrant
- w/o = Walkover
- r = Retired
- d = Defaulted

=== Draw ===
First round
(Canada) F Abanda (United States) S Rogers	2	4
(United Kingdom) J Rae (United Kingdom) A Smith	6	6
3	(United States) V King (United States) T Townsend	6^{5}	6	[10]
(United States) L Litvak (United States) A Mueller	7^{7}	4	[3]
(Japan) H Kuwata (Japan) K Nara	6	6
(United Kingdom) N Slater (United Kingdom) E Webley-Smith	2	1
(Latvia) L Dekmeijere (United States) N Melichar	6	5	[10]
(France) A Cornet (Belgium) K Flipkens	2	7	[4]
(United States) L Chirico (United States) S Marand	7	1	[11]
4	(Australia) A Rodionova (Australia) O Rogowska	5	6	[13]
(United States) I Falconi (United States) K Wong	6	6
WC	(United States) R Ellison (United States) S Ellison	4	1

Quarterfinals
1	(Zimbabwe) C Black (India) S Mirza	4	3
(United Kingdom) J Rae (United Kingdom) A Smith	6	6
3	(United States) V King (United States) T Townsend
(Japan) H Kuwata (Japan) K Nara	w/o
(Latvia) L Dekmeijere (United States) N Melichar	7^{7}	1	[14]
4	(Australia) A Rodionova (Australia) O Rogowska	6^{2}	6	[12]
(United States) I Falconi (United States) K Wong	2	2
2	(Japan) S Aoyama (Canada) G Dabrowski	6	6

Semifinals
(United Kingdom) J Rae (United Kingdom) A Smith	1	6	[10]
(Japan) H Kuwata (Japan) K Nara	6	1	[12]
(Latvia) L Dekmeijere (United States) N Melichar	7^{7}	3	[6]
2	(Japan) S Aoyama (Canada) G Dabrowski	6^{5}	6	[10]

Final
(Japan) H Kuwata (Japan) K Nara	1	2
2	(Japan) S Aoyama (Canada) G Dabrowski	6	6
