= 2014 Citi Open – Men's singles =

Men's singles
- 2014 Citi Open

Final
- Champion: (Canada) Milos Raonic
- Runner-up: (Canada) Vasek Pospisil
- Score: 6–1, 6–4

Details
- Draw: 48 (6Q / 4WC)
- Seeds: 16

Events
Singles	men	women
Doubles	men	women
- Washington Open

Juan Martín del Potro was the defending champion, but was unable to participate this year due to a wrist injury.

Milos Raonic won the title, defeating Vasek Pospisil, 6–1, 6–4, in the first-ever all-Canadian final on the ATP World Tour.

== Seeds ==
All seeds received a bye into the second round.

1. (Czech Republic) Tomáš Berdych (third round)
2. (Canada) Milos Raonic (champion)
3. (Bulgaria) Grigor Dimitrov (withdrew due to flu-like symptoms)
4. (Japan) Kei Nishikori (quarterfinals)
5. (United States) John Isner (second round)
6. (France) Richard Gasquet (semifinals)
7. (South Africa) Kevin Anderson (quarterfinals)
8. (Spain) Feliciano López (second round)
9. (Croatia) Ivo Karlović (third round)
10. (Colombia) Santiago Giraldo (quarterfinals)
11. (Czech Republic) Radek Štěpánek (second round)
12. (France) Jérémy Chardy (second round)
13. (Canada) Vasek Pospisil (final)
14. (Australia) Lleyton Hewitt (third round)
15. (Uzbekistan) Denis Istomin (third round)
16. (Chinese Taipei) Lu Yen-hsun (second round)
17. (France) Julien Benneteau (second round)

Click on the seed number of a player to go to their draw section.

== Draw ==
Key

- Q = Qualifier
- WC = Wild card
- LL = Lucky loser
- Alt = Alternate
- ITF = ITF entry
- PR = Protected ranking
- SR = Special ranking
- SE = Special exempt
- JE = Junior exempt
- JR = Junior Accelerator Programme entrant
- CO = College Accelerator Programme entrant
- NG = Next Gen Accelerator Program entrant
- w/o = Walkover
- r = Retired
- d = Defaulted

=== Finals ===
Quarterfinals
13	(Canada) Vasek Pospisil	6^{4}	6	6
10	(Colombia) Santiago Giraldo	7^{7}	3	4
4	(Japan) Kei Nishikori	1	4
6	(France) Richard Gasquet	6	6
7	(South Africa) Kevin Anderson	6	6^{3}	2
(United States) Donald Young	3	7^{7}	6
(United States) Steve Johnson	6^{2}	2
2	(Canada) Milos Raonic	7^{7}	6

Semifinals
13	(Canada) Vasek Pospisil	6^{5}	6	7
6	(France) Richard Gasquet	7^{7}	3	5
(United States) Donald Young	4	5
2	(Canada) Milos Raonic	6	7

Final
13	(Canada) Vasek Pospisil	1	4
2	(Canada) Milos Raonic	6	6

=== Top half ===
==== Section 1 ====
First round
Q	(United States) R Ginepri	6	6
(Colombia) A Falla	4	2
Q	(United States) R Ram	6^{1}	6	7
Q	(United States) J Donaldson	7^{7}	4	5
(Slovenia) B Kavčič	3	6^{7}
(Germany) B Becker	6	7^{9}
(Dominican Republic) V Estrella Burgos	6	4	7^{7}
(Germany) T Kamke	2	6	6^{4}

Second round
1/WC	(Czech Republic) T Berdych	6	6
Q	(United States) R Ginepri	1	4
Q	(United States) R Ram	0	6^{8}
13	(Canada) V Pospisil	6	7^{10}
10	(Colombia) S Giraldo	6	7^{7}
(Germany) B Becker	2	6^{3}
(Dominican Republic) V Estrella Burgos	7^{7}	6
8	(Spain) F López	6^{5}	4

Third round
1/WC	(Czech Republic) T Berdych	2	4
13	(Canada) V Pospisil	6	6
10	(Colombia) S Giraldo	6	6
(Dominican Republic) V Estrella Burgos	2	0

Quarterfinals
13	(Canada) V Pospisil	6^{4}	6	6
10	(Colombia) S Giraldo	7^{7}	3	4

==== Section 2 ====
First round
(United States) S Querrey	6	6
(United States) M Russell	4	3
(Slovakia) L Lacko	7	6
WC	(Canada) F Peliwo	5	3
(United States) T Smyczek	6	6
Q	(United States) A Kuznetsov	3	0
(Israel) D Sela	7^{7}	3	6
LL	(Australia) S Groth	6^{3}	6	4

Second round
4	(Japan) K Nishikori	6	5	6
(United States) S Querrey	4	7	4
(Slovakia) L Lacko	6	6
16	(Chinese Taipei) Y-h Lu	1	4
12	(France) J Chardy	6^{5}	6	4
(United States) T Smyczek	7^{7}	3	6
(Israel) D Sela	3	2
6	(France) R Gasquet	6	6

Third round
4	(Japan) K Nishikori	6	2	6
(Slovakia) L Lacko	2	6	3
(United States) T Smyczek	3	2
6	(France) R Gasquet	6	6

Quarterfinals
4	(Japan) K Nishikori	1	4
6	(France) R Gasquet	6	6

=== Bottom half ===
==== Section 3 ====
First round
WC	(United States) F Tiafoe	4	4
(Russia) E Donskoy	6	6
(Tunisia) M Jaziri	7^{7}	6
(Ukraine) S Stakhovsky	6^{2}	4
(Colombia) A González	3	2
(Australia) B Tomic	6	6
Q	(Japan) Y Sugita	4	6	4
(United States) D Young	6	4	6

Second round
7	(South Africa) K Anderson	6	6
(Russia) E Donskoy	3	4
(Tunisia) M Jaziri	2	7^{7}	6
11	(Czech Republic) R Štěpánek	6	6^{3}	1
15	(Uzbekistan) D Istomin	6	7^{8}
(Australia) B Tomic	4	6^{6}
(United States) D Young	6	6
17	(France) J Benneteau	4	3

Third round
7	(South Africa) K Anderson	6	6
(Tunisia) M Jaziri	3	4
15	(Uzbekistan) D Istomin	3	6	3
(United States) D Young	6	3	6

Quarterfinals
7	(South Africa) K Anderson	6	6^{3}	2
(United States) D Young	3	7^{7}	6

==== Section 4 ====
First round
(United States) S Johnson	6	7^{7}
WC	(Australia) J Duckworth	3	6^{4}
(Canada) F Dancevic	4	0
(France) B Paire	6	6
(Australia) M Matosevic	6	7
Q	(Ukraine) I Marchenko	4	5
(Germany) M Berrer	6^{2}	4
(United States) J Sock	7^{7}	6

Second round
5	(United States) J Isner	7^{7}	3	6^{6}
(United States) S Johnson	6^{5}	6	7^{8}
(France) B Paire	6^{5}	7^{13}	6^{2}
9	(Croatia) I Karlović	7^{7}	6^{11}	7^{7}
14	(Australia) L Hewitt	6	6
(Australia) M Matosevic	4	3
(United States) J Sock	6^{3}	6^{3}
2	(Canada) M Raonic	7^{7}	7^{7}

Third round
(United States) S Johnson	3	7^{7}	7^{9}
9	(Croatia) I Karlović	6	6^{4}	6^{7}
14	(Australia) L Hewitt	6^{1}	6^{3}
2	(Canada) M Raonic	7^{7}	7^{7}

Quarterfinals
(United States) S Johnson	6^{2}	2
2	(Canada) M Raonic	7^{7}	6

== Qualifying ==
=== Seeds ===
1. (Australia) Sam Groth (qualifying competition, Lucky loser)
2. (Japan) Yūichi Sugita (qualified)
3. (India) Yuki Bhambri (first round, retired)
4. (United States) Rajeev Ram (qualified)
5. (Romania) Marius Copil (qualifying competition)
6. (United States) Alex Kuznetsov (qualified)
7. (Ukraine) Illya Marchenko (qualified)
8. (China) Zhang Ze (withdrew)
9. (France) Michaël Llodra (first round, retired)
10. (Chile) Gonzalo Lama (first round)
11. (Ecuador) Emilio Gómez (qualifying competition)
12. (Canada) Steven Diez (first round)

=== Qualifiers ===
1. (United States) Robby Ginepri
2. (Japan) Yūichi Sugita
3. (United States) Jared Donaldson
4. (United States) Rajeev Ram
5. (Ukraine) Illya Marchenko
6. (United States) Alex Kuznetsov

=== Lucky losers ===
1. (Australia) Sam Groth

=== Qualifying draw ===
==== First qualifier ====
First round
1	(Australia) Sam Groth	3	7^{7}	6
WC	(United States) Stefan Kozlov	6	6^{5}	4
(United States) Robby Ginepri	4	6	6
12	(Canada) Steven Diez	6	4	4

Qualifying competition
1	(Australia) Sam Groth	4	4
(United States) Robby Ginepri	6	6

==== Second qualifier ====
First round
2	(Japan) Yūichi Sugita	7^{7}	6
(Zimbabwe) Takanyi Garanganga	6^{5}	4
WC	(United States) Justin Shane	4	4
Alt	(United States) Andrew Carter	6	6

Qualifying competition
2	(Japan) Yūichi Sugita	6	6
Alt	(United States) Andrew Carter	0	1

==== Third qualifier ====
First round
3	(India) Yuki Bhambri	6	6^{1}	0^{r}
(United States) Sekou Bangoura	2	7^{7}	0
(United States) Jared Donaldson	6	6
10	(Chile) Gonzalo Lama	1	1

Qualifying competition
(United States) Sekou Bangoura	3	1
(United States) Jared Donaldson	6	6

==== Fourth qualifier ====
First round
4	(United States) Rajeev Ram	7	6
(United States) Michael Shabaz	5	2
(India) Sanam Singh	4	7^{7}	1
11	(Ecuador) Emilio Gómez	6	6^{5}	6

Qualifying competition
4	(United States) Rajeev Ram	6	7^{7}
11	(Ecuador) Emilio Gómez	4	6^{2}

==== Fifth qualifier ====
First round
5	(Romania) Marius Copil	6	6
(India) Saketh Myneni	2	4
(France) Antoine Benneteau	3	4
7	(Ukraine) Illya Marchenko	6	6

Qualifying competition
5	(Romania) Marius Copil	7^{7}	6^{4}	4
7	(Ukraine) Illya Marchenko	6^{3}	7^{7}	6

==== Sixth qualifier ====
First round
6	(United States) Alex Kuznetsov	6	6
WC	(United States) Ryan Shane	2	1
WC	(Argentina) Jordi Arconada	3
9	(France) Michaël Llodra	2^{r}

Qualifying competition
6	(United States) Alex Kuznetsov	3	6	6
WC	(Argentina) Jordi Arconada	6	1	0
