= 2014 Citi Open – Men's doubles =

Men's doubles
- 2014 Citi Open

Final
- Champions: (Netherlands) Jean-Julien Rojer (Romania) Horia Tecău
- Runners-up: (Australia) Sam Groth (India) Leander Paes
- Score: 7–5, 6–4

Details
- Draw: 16
- Seeds: 4

Events
Singles	men	women
Doubles	men	women
- Washington Open

Julien Benneteau and Nenad Zimonjić were the defending doubles champions, but chose not to participate together. Benneteau played alongside Michaël Llodra, but lost to Jean-Julien Rojer and Horia Tecău in the first round. Zimonjić teamed up with Daniel Nestor, but lost to Juan Sebastián Cabal and David Marrero in the first round.

The unseeded team of Rojer and Tecău won the title, defeating Sam Groth and Leander Paes in the final, 7–5, 6–4.

== Seeds ==
1. (United States) Bob Bryan / (United States) Mike Bryan (quarterfinals)
2. (Austria) Alexander Peya / (Brazil) Bruno Soares (quarterfinals)
3. (Canada) Daniel Nestor / (Serbia) Nenad Zimonjić (first round)
4. (Croatia) Ivan Dodig / (Brazil) Marcelo Melo (quarterfinals)

== Draw ==
Key

- Q = Qualifier
- WC = Wild card
- LL = Lucky loser
- Alt = Alternate
- ITF = ITF entry
- PR = Protected ranking
- SR = Special ranking
- SE = Special exempt
- JE = Junior exempt
- JR = Junior Accelerator Programme entrant
- CO = College Accelerator Programme entrant
- NG = Next Gen Accelerator Program entrant
- w/o = Walkover
- r = Retired
- d = Defaulted

=== Draw ===
First round
1	(United States) B Bryan (United States) M Bryan	7	6
WC	(United States) J Donaldson (United States) S Kozlov	5	0
(United States) E Butorac (South Africa) R Klaasen	6^{3}	6^{4}
WC	(United States) S Johnson (United States) S Querrey	7^{7}	7^{7}
3	(Canada) D Nestor (Serbia) N Zimonjić	2	2
(Colombia) JS Cabal (Spain) D Marrero	6	6
(Australia) S Groth (India) L Paes	6	7^{7}
(France) J Chardy (Sweden) R Lindstedt	1	6^{4}
Q	(Israel) J Erlich (United States) R Ram	6	6
(United Kingdom) J Murray (Australia) J Peers	3	4
(India) R Bopanna (Pakistan) A-u-H Qureshi	6	6^{8}	[8]
4	(Croatia) I Dodig (Brazil) M Melo	4	7^{10}	[10]
(France) J Benneteau (France) M Llodra	6^{7}	3
(Netherlands) J-J Rojer (Romania) H Tecău	7^{9}	6
(Philippines) T Huey (United Kingdom) D Inglot	5	6^{5}
2	(Austria) A Peya (Brazil) B Soares	7	7^{7}

Quarterfinals
1	(United States) B Bryan (United States) M Bryan	5	6	[8]
WC	(United States) S Johnson (United States) S Querrey	7	2	[10]
(Colombia) JS Cabal (Spain) D Marrero	6^{3}	6	[10]
(Australia) S Groth (India) L Paes	7^{7}	3	[12]
Q	(Israel) J Erlich (United States) R Ram	6	6
4	(Croatia) I Dodig (Brazil) M Melo	2	2
(Netherlands) J-J Rojer (Romania) H Tecău	7^{7}	6
2	(Austria) A Peya (Brazil) B Soares	6^{3}	2

Semifinals
WC	(United States) S Johnson (United States) S Querrey	6	3	[8]
(Australia) S Groth (India) L Paes	4	6	[10]
Q	(Israel) J Erlich (United States) R Ram	4	2
(Netherlands) J-J Rojer (Romania) H Tecău	6	6

Final
(Australia) S Groth (India) L Paes	5	4
(Netherlands) J-J Rojer (Romania) H Tecău	7	6

== Qualifying ==
=== Seeds ===
1. (Poland) Mariusz Fyrstenberg / (Poland) Marcin Matkowski (first round)
2. (Israel) Jonathan Erlich / (United States) Rajeev Ram (qualified)

=== Qualifiers ===
1. (Israel) Jonathan Erlich / (United States) Rajeev Ram

=== Qualifying draw ===
First round
1	(Poland) Mariusz Fyrstenberg (Poland) Marcin Matkowski	6^{1}	4
(Romania) Marius Copil (Ukraine) Sergiy Stakhovsky	7^{7}	6
(United States) Sekou Bangoura (United States) Michael Shabaz	0	5
2	(Israel) Jonathan Erlich (United States) Rajeev Ram	6	7

Qualifying competition
(Romania) Marius Copil (Ukraine) Sergiy Stakhovsky	3	4
2	(Israel) Jonathan Erlich (United States) Rajeev Ram	6	6
