= 2014 Citi Open – Women's singles =

Women's singles
- 2014 Citi Open

Final
- Champion: (Russia) Svetlana Kuznetsova
- Runner-up: (Japan) Kurumi Nara
- Score: 6–3, 4–6, 6–4

Details
- Draw: 32
- Seeds: 8

Events
Singles	men	women
Doubles	men	women
- Citi Open

Magdaléna Rybáriková was the two-time defending champion, but lost to Ekaterina Makarova in the first round.

Svetlana Kuznetsova won the title, defeating Kurumi Nara in the final, 6–3, 4–6, 6–4.

== Seeds ==
1. (Czech Republic) Lucie Šafářová (first round)
2. (Russia) Ekaterina Makarova (semifinals)
3. (France) Alizé Cornet (first round)
4. (United States) Sloane Stephens (first round)
5. (Russia) Anastasia Pavlyuchenkova (quarterfinals)
6. (Russia) Svetlana Kuznetsova (champion)
7. (United States) Madison Keys (first round)
8. (Romania) Sorana Cîrstea (second round)

== Draw ==
Key

- Q = Qualifier
- WC = Wild card
- LL = Lucky loser
- Alt = Alternate
- ITF = ITF entry
- PR = Protected ranking
- SR = Special ranking
- SE = Special exempt
- JE = Junior exempt
- JR = Junior Accelerator Programme entrant
- CO = College Accelerator Programme entrant
- NG = Next Gen Accelerator Program entrant
- w/o = Walkover
- r = Retired
- d = Defaulted

=== Finals ===
Semifinals
(Japan) Kurumi Nara	0	6	6
(New Zealand) Marina Erakovic	6	4	4
6	(Russia) Svetlana Kuznetsova	6	6
2	(Russia) Ekaterina Makarova	3	2

Final
(Japan) Kurumi Nara	3	6	4
6	(Russia) Svetlana Kuznetsova	6	4	6

=== Top half ===
First round
1	(Czech Republic) L Šafářová	6	3	3
(France) K Mladenovic	2	6	6
(Germany) J Görges	6	2	3
Q	(United States) T Townsend	3	6	6
Q	(United States) TA Black	4	0
(Kazakhstan) Z Diyas	6	6
(Japan) K Nara	7	6
7	(United States) M Keys	5	3
3	(France) A Cornet	5	6	4
WC	(United States) S Rogers	7	4	6
(Czech Republic) Kr Plíšková	6	2	4
(New Zealand) M Erakovic	4	6	6
(Serbia) B Jovanovski	6^{5}	7	7
Q	(Australia) O Rogowska	7^{7}	5	5
(Netherlands) K Bertens	4	6	3
8	(Romania) S Cîrstea	6	4	6

Second round
(France) K Mladenovic	6	6
Q	(United States) T Townsend	3	4
(Kazakhstan) Z Diyas	6	2	0^{r}
(Japan) K Nara	3	6	4
WC	(United States) S Rogers	2	2
(New Zealand) M Erakovic	6	6
(Serbia) B Jovanovski	4	7	6
8	(Romania) S Cîrstea	6	5	3

Quarterfinals
(France) K Mladenovic	3	1
(Japan) K Nara	6	6
(New Zealand) M Erakovic	6	6
(Serbia) B Jovanovski	4	4

Semifinals
(Japan) K Nara	0	6	6
(New Zealand) M Erakovic	6	4	4

=== Bottom half ===
First round
6	(Russia) S Kuznetsova	6	6
(Slovenia) P Hercog	3	2
(United Kingdom) H Watson	3	6	6^{3}
(Belgium) K Flipkens	6	1	7^{7}
(United States) V King	6	6
WC	(Canada) F Abanda	2	0
(United States) C McHale	6	4	6
4	(United States) S Stephens	4	6	0
5	(Russia) A Pavlyuchenkova	6	6
(France) V Razzano	2	2
(United States) A Riske	0	5
Q	(Japan) H Kuwata	6	7
(United States) L Davis	1	6	6
(China) S Peng	6	4	2
(Slovakia) M Rybáriková	1	1
2	(Russia) E Makarova	6	6

Second round
6	(Russia) S Kuznetsova	6	7
(Belgium) K Flipkens	4	5
(United States) V King	6	6
(United States) C McHale	1	3
5	(Russia) A Pavlyuchenkova	6	6
Q	(Japan) H Kuwata	3	3
(United States) L Davis	2	4
2	(Russia) E Makarova	6	6

Quarterfinals
6	(Russia) S Kuznetsova	w/o
(United States) V King
5	(Russia) A Pavlyuchenkova	6^{3}	3
2	(Russia) E Makarova	7^{7}	6

Semifinals
6	(Russia) S Kuznetsova	6	6
2	(Russia) E Makarova	3	2

== Qualifying ==
=== Seeds ===
1. (Czech Republic) Tereza Smitková (qualifying competition)
2. (Portugal) Michelle Larcher de Brito (first round)
3. (Australia) Olivia Rogowska (qualified)
4. (Austria) Tamira Paszek (first round)
5. (United States) Taylor Townsend (qualified)
6. (Canada) Gabriela Dabrowski (qualifying competition)
7. (Japan) Hiroko Kuwata (qualified)
8. (United States) Louisa Chirico (first round)

=== Qualifiers ===
1. (United States) Taylor Townsend
2. (Japan) Hiroko Kuwata
3. (Australia) Olivia Rogowska
4. (United States) Tornado Alicia Black

=== Draw ===
==== First qualifier ====
First round
1	(Czech Republic) Tereza Smitková	7	6
(Slovenia) Petra Rampre	5	4
(United States) Alexandra Mueller	1	6	1
5	(United States) Taylor Townsend	6	1	6

Qualifying competition
1	(Czech Republic) Tereza Smitková	3	4
5	(United States) Taylor Townsend	6	6

==== Second qualifier ====
First round
2	(Portugal) Michelle Larcher de Brito	4	5
(Canada) Stéphanie Dubois	6	7
(United States) Sanaz Marand	5	5
7	(Japan) Hiroko Kuwata	7	7

Qualifying competition
(Canada) Stéphanie Dubois	6	2	6^{3}
7	(Japan) Hiroko Kuwata	4	6	7^{7}

==== Third qualifier ====
First round
3	(Australia) Olivia Rogowska	6	7^{7}
(France) Julie Coin	4	6^{3}
(Australia) Arina Rodionova	3	1
6	(Canada) Gabriela Dabrowski	6	6

Qualifying competition
3	(Australia) Olivia Rogowska	2	7^{7}	7^{7}
6	(Canada) Gabriela Dabrowski	6	6^{5}	6^{5}

==== Fourth qualifier ====
First round
4	(Austria) Tamira Paszek	1	3
(United Kingdom) Emily Webley-Smith	6	6
WC	(United States) Tornado Alicia Black	6	6
8	(United States) Louisa Chirico	3	1

Qualifying competition
(United Kingdom) Emily Webley-Smith	3	0
WC	(United States) Tornado Alicia Black	6	6
