= Olivia Lukaszewicz =

Australian tennis player

- Country (sports): Australia
- Born: 15 September 1988 (age 38) Adelaide, Australia
- Plays: Right-handed
- Prize money: $24,940

Singles
- Highest ranking: No. 525 (16 January 2006)

Grand Slam singles results
- Australian Open: 1R (2004)

Doubles
- Highest ranking: No. 514 (20 February 2006)

Olivia Lukaszewicz (born 15 September 1988) is a former professional tennis player from Australia. In 2021, she joined the Schoenstatt Sisters of Mary, an international Catholic community of religious women, part of the Schoenstatt movement.

== Biography ==
Lukaszewicz was born in Adelaide to Polish immigrant parents. She attended the Australian Institute of Sport on a scholarship and had a top 40 ranking in a promising junior career.

A right-handed player, Lukaszewicz received a wildcard into the singles main draw of the 2004 Australian Open at the age of 15. At the time, she was ranked barely within the world's top 1000 at the time and was drawn up against the top seed Justine Henin-Hardenne in the first-round. The match, played in Rod Laver Arena, was over in 45 minutes, with the world number one winning 6–0, 6–0. She also exited in the opening round of the junior competition by the same scoreline, beaten by Shahar Pe'er. Henin-Hardenne's coach Carlos Rodríguez later criticized the Australian Open officials for mismatch, questioning whether a wildcard should have been granted.

In addition to her Australian Open appearance in 2004, she was also a member of Australia's Fed Cup squad that year for a tie against Russia in Moscow. Having already been in Moscow as a hitting partner, she joined Alicia Molik, Samantha Stosur and Rennae Stubbs as the fourth team member after Nicole Pratt withdrew.

Following her career in tennis she studied nutrition worked in Adelaide as a dietitian. In 2021 she left her work to join the Schoenstatt Sisters of Mary, an international Catholic community of religious women, part of the international Schoenstatt movement.

== ITF Circuit finals ==
$25,000 tournaments
$10,000 tournaments

=== Doubles (0–2) ===
Outcome	No	Date	Tournament	Surface	Partner	Opponents in the final	Score
Runner-up	1.	31 July 2005	Pontevedra, Spain	Hard	(Belarus) Galina Semenova	(Spain) Anna Font (Spain) Laura Vallverdu-Zaira	3–6, 7–6, 4–6
Runner-up	2.	25 September 2005	Mackay, Australia	Hard	(Australia) Monique Adamczak	(Australia) Casey Dellacqua (Australia) Daniella Jeflea	6–7^{(6)}, 6–7^{(2)}
