= Melanie South =

English tennis player

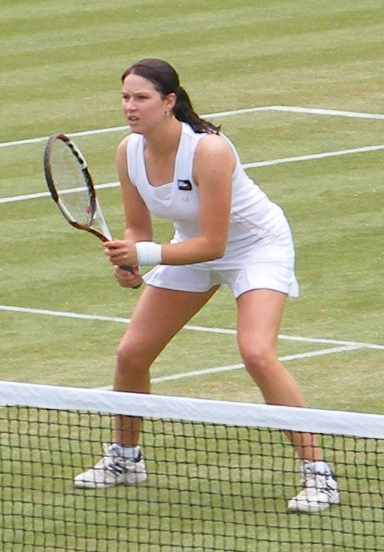
- South at the 2007 Wimbledon Championships
- Full name: Melanie Jayne South
- Country (sports): United Kingdom
- Residence: New Malden, London
- Born: 3 May 1986 (age 40) Kingston, London
- Height: 1.75 m (5 ft 9 in)
- Turned pro: 2004
- Retired: 2013
- Plays: Right-handed (two-handed backhand)
- Prize money: $464,831

Singles
- Career record: 301–257
- Career titles: 6 ITF
- Highest ranking: No. 99 (2 February 2009)

Grand Slam singles results
- Australian Open: 1R (2009)
- French Open: 1R (2009)
- Wimbledon: 2R (2006)
- US Open: Q3 (2008)

Doubles
- Career record: 236–156
- Career titles: 24 ITF
- Highest ranking: No. 120 (9 March 2009)

Grand Slam doubles results
- Wimbledon: 2R (2008, 2009)

Grand Slam mixed doubles results
- Wimbledon: QF (2007)

Team competitions
- Fed Cup: 3–2

Melanie Jayne South (born 3 May 1986) is a former English tennis player. She won six singles and 24 doubles titles on the ITF Circuit. On 2 February 2009, she reached her best singles ranking of world No. 99. On 9 March 2009, she peaked at No. 120 in the doubles rankings.

Her greatest success in a Grand Slam tournament came in the first round of the 2006 Wimbledon Championships when she came back from one set down to beat world No. 14, Francesca Schiavone, in a match witnessed by Martina Navratilova. At the time, South was ranked No. 305 in the world and had reached the main-draw courtesy of a wildcard. Not since the third round of the 1998 tournament, when Samantha Smith beat then-world No. 7, Conchita Martínez, had a British woman beaten an opponent of a similar ranking at Wimbledon. She lost in the second round to Shenay Perry, the world No. 62. Outside of Wimbledon, South reached the first round of the 2009 Australian Open without needing to qualify or receiving a wildcard. This was the first time in her career that her ranking was high enough to grant her access to a Grand Slam main draw without a wildcard. She lost to world No. 17 Marion Bartoli in round one.

South announced her retirement from professional tour on 2 December 2013 in order to focus on a coaching career.

== Personal life ==
Melanie's mother is called Sheila and her father, John, used to play professional football for Fulham (1964–66) and Brentford (1966–67). John is now a tennis coach at New Malden tennis club and Sheila was a short tennis coach. She has two brothers, Andrew and Stephen, who both used to play tennis recreationally. She began playing tennis herself at the age of six.

She attended Nonsuch High School in Cheam, South London where she gained seven GCSEs (one A* grade, four As and two Bs) and two A grades in A-level Psychology and PE as well as a grade C in A-level General Studies. She is currently furthering her education by taking an Open University course in Understanding Health which she hopes will lead onto another course in psychology.

== Playing style ==
South's style of gameplay centred around her powerful serve and her aggressive ground strokes. She regularly served aces and got many more free points from other serves which could not be returned, which made her a difficult player to break when she played at her best. However, because her serve was so high-risk, at times she served a large number of double faults and when a couple of these come in the same game it puts her at a sizeable disadvantage. In her first round match at Wimbledon 2008 against Alona Bondarenko she served a total of ten aces, seven double faults and won 68% of the points behind her first serve. She also hit 45 winners and 48 unforced errors during this match, a statistic which demonstrates her aggressive, high-risk attitude to tennis. Renowned tennis coach Nick Bollettieri saw South play during her first round match against his charge, Michelle Larcher de Brito, at the 2008 French Open and commented: "She can serve well and has good ground strokes. She moves well for a big girl but you can see that lateral movement is a problem for her. Whenever she's pushed out wide she can struggle."

== Career review ==
=== Junior (1999–2004) ===
South debuted on the ITF Junior Circuit in June 1999. She saw very little in the way of singles success until July 2002, when she reached her first tournament quarterfinal at The Scottish Junior Championships. Six months later, she won the 17th Salik Open (her only singles title at junior level), and then reached the semifinals of her next tournament before losing to Anna Chakvetadze. Following this, she reached the quarterfinals of her next two tournaments. She competed in the Wimbledon girls' tournament only twice and lost in the first round each time. In singles, her career-high ranking was world No. 266, and her win–loss record was 15–8.

As a junior doubles player she won one title, the Scottish Junior International Championships, as well as losing in the final of two others (the Västerås International Junior Championships and the LTA Junior International Tournament Wrexham). In 2004, she reached the quarterfinals of the Wimbledon girls' doubles, partnering Katie O'Brien. Her junior win–loss record in doubles was 7–7 and her highest ranking was world No. 335.

=== 2001–2003 ===
Her first professional match (and only match that year) came in October 2001; a match which she lost in straight sets to Natalia Egorova from Russia.

In 2002, in only her second match at adult level, she received a wildcard into the qualifying draw at Wimbledon and lost to Adriana Barna. South spent the rest of 2002 playing in ITF tournaments in Great Britain, not getting past the second round in any of them. She finished 2002 with her world ranking at No. 931.

During 2003, she played a total of ten matches (again all ITF) and won four of them. She again failed to progress further than the second round of any of these tournaments and at the end of the 2003 season she had a ranking of No. 851.

=== 2004 ===
2004 WTA Tour began well for South; in her first four tournaments of the year, she managed to reach the quarterfinals, second round, quarterfinal and semifinal, respectively, before going on to win her fifth tournament of the year. In her sixth tournament, she lost in the first round before reaching the final of the next, losing to Elke Clijsters (sister of former world number one, Kim Clijsters) in three sets. Later that month she reached the semifinals of the $10k event in Antalya, Turkey. In June she played her first match on the WTA Tour, when she received a wildcard into the Tier III Birmingham Classic. She lost in the first round of the qualifying tournament to Maria Kirilenko. She immediately received another wildcard into the qualifying draw of Wimbledon, but lost in straight sets to Bethanie Mattek in the first round. After Wimbledon, she played three more ITF tournaments and reached the quarterfinals of two of them. At the end of 2004 her ranking was No. 453.

=== 2005 ===
In January 2005, she played the $10k event in Tipton where she reached the quarterfinals, losing to Katie O'Brien. In April, she won the second ITF Circuit title of her career, beating top-seed Anne Keothavong in the final. Between winning this and losing in the first round of qualifying for Wimbledon for the third year running, she reached the final of one more ITF tournament and the semifinal stage of another. After Wimbledon, she played nine more ITF events, reaching the semifinal stage in two of them. Her ranking was world No. 449 at the end of 2005.

=== 2006 ===
In the first half of 2006, she won the third ITF tournament of her career in Hull and reached the semifinals of another ITF event, this one in Tenerife, as a qualifier before losing to Andrea Hlaváčková. In the run-up to Wimbledon 2006, she played two WTA tournaments courtesy of wildcards. She lost in the first round of the Birmingham Classic (Tier III) to fellow wildcard Sarah Borwell in three sets, and also lost in the first round of qualifying for the Tier-II tournament in Eastbourne. In June, South played for the first time in the Wimbledon main draw as a wildcard and reached the second round by beating No. 11 seed, Francesca Schiavone, in the first round. She lost to Shenay Perry in the second round. South's win over world No. 14 Schiavone was a career-first top-20 victory, and the best win in terms of ranking for a British player since Sam Smith beat No. 7, Conchita Martínez, at Wimbledon in 1998. After Wimbledon, South won another ITF tournament, reached three semifinals and two more quarterfinals. She participated in the qualifying tournament for the US Open in September but did not progress further than the first round. Her year-end ranking was world No. 176.

=== 2007 ===
2007 started slowly for South, with a loss in the first round of qualifying for the Tier-IV Auckland Open to Sara Errani (a later top-40 player) and a loss in the first round of the qualifying tournament for the Australian Open to Timea Bacsinszky (a future top-50 player). South reached the quarterfinals of another ITF tournament in May, before losing to Casey Dellacqua. In June she lost in the first round of qualifying for the French Open, reached the quarterfinals of another ITF (Surbiton), lost in the second round of the qualifying tournament for the Birmingham Classic and reached the second round of the Tier-II tournament in Eastbourne, beating Alicia Molik in the first round, before losing to Marion Bartoli in the second. Immediately after this came another appearance in the main draw of Wimbledon where she played Japanese veteran Ai Sugiyama but lost. The rest of South's 2007 season saw her reach three more ITF semifinals and four quarterfinals. She failed to qualify for the US Open for the second year in a row. Her year-end ranking fell to No. 214.

=== 2008 ===
South started her 2008 season by attempting to qualify for the Auckland Open. She reached the final round of qualifying before falling to compatriot Elena Baltacha. She then went on to lose to Tamarine Tanasugarn in the first round of qualifying for the Australian Open. Following this, she reached the semifinals of the $75k event in Midland, before being demolished by Ashley Harkleroad. In March, she reached the final round of qualifying for the Bangalore Open before becoming a quarterfinalist in the $25k event in Kalgoorlie, winning the title in another $25k in Sorrento and then reaching the quarterfinals of the $50k event in Patras. Her next noteworthy results came in late April and early May when she reached the semifinals in two back-to-back $50k events in Japan. She was beaten in the first round of qualifying for the French Open by fellow Brit Katie O'Brien. Her grass-court season began with her best result to date in a WTA tournament by reaching the quarterfinals of the Birmingham Classic. She defeated fellow British wildcard Anna Fitzpatrick in round one, before beating No. 4 seed Sybille Bammer in the second. In the third round, she came up against 17th seed Aiko Nakamura and won in three sets. Unseeded Yanina Wickmayer beat South in the quarterfinals. Following this, she received another wildcard into the International Women's Open where she lost in the first round to Alisa Kleybanova. She entered the main draw of the Wimbledon Championships courtesy of another wildcard and gave No. 28 seed Alona Bondarenko a battle in round one. South was eventually defeated in three sets.

After Wimbledon, she attempted to qualify for the Tier-II tournament in Los Angeles but fell in the final round of qualifying. However, No. 2 seed Serena Williams withdrew from the tournament before her first-round match resulting in South getting into the main draw as a lucky loser. As Serena was the No. 2 seed, South received her bye into the second round where she capitalised on this good opportunity by beating Petra Kvitová. Yuan Meng from China beat South in the third round. She followed this up by qualifying for the Rogers Cup where tenth seed Marion Bartoli beat her in round one. In August, she reached the final round of qualifying for the US Open where she was beaten by Zhang Shuai. In October and November, South reached four consecutive $25k tournaments in Traralgon, Mount Gambier, Port Pirie and Pune. She lost to Jarmila Gajdošová, Natalie Grandin, beat Yurika Sema and then lost to Lu Jingjing respectively. She finished the year with a run to the quarterfinals of the $75k tournament in Toyota, giving her a year-end ranking of world No. 116.

=== 2009 ===
In early January, South attempted to qualify for the Brisbane International tournament where she lost to Ekaterina Bychkova. She followed this up by entering the qualifying draw for the Sydney International, a Premier event. South defeated Akgul Amanmuradova, Kristina Barrois and Yuan Meng to qualify for the tournament. She qualified for the main draw of the Australian Open when Maria Sharapova withdrew because of injury. Because Anne Keothavong had already qualified for the main draw, it was the first time since Jo Durie and Clare Wood in the 1993 US Open, that two British women had gained direct entry into a Grand Slam championship. South made it to the second round at Brisbane after Bartoli retired due to a left calf strain at 1–1 in the first set. She was defeated in the second round by No. 2 seed, Caroline Wozniacki, in straight sets. In the first round of the Australian Open, South fell to Bartoli in straight sets. South broke into the top 100 for the first time on 2 February 2009, achieving a career-high ranking of 99. This marked the first time in nearly 16 years that two British women had been inside the top 100, following Durie and Monique Javer in March 1993.

South spent the following week in Estonia playing in the 2009 Fed Cup alongside compatriots Anne Keothavong, Elena Baltacha and doubles specialist Sarah Borwell. Great Britain was drawn into the same group as Hungary, Netherlands and Luxembourg. Against Hungary, South and Borwell teamed up to face Katalin Marosi and Ágnes Szávay, and defeated them in straight sets, thus contributing to Britain's 3–0 victory over Hungary. She was not required to participate when Britain defeated the Netherlands, 3–0, but played in both the doubles and singles in the third and final tie against Luxembourg. She beat Fabienne Thill, and followed this victory up with another in doubles, beating Mandy Minella and Thill with partner Sarah Borwell. This gave Britain a 9–0 record in their group, making them the Group A winner and giving them the opportunity to play another group winner for a chance to participate in the World Group II Play-offs. However, Britain lost 2–1 to Poland in the playoffs. Following this, South gained direct entry into the International tournament, the Cellular South Cup on the merit of her own ranking but was beaten by the third seed Lucie Šafářová in round one.

She then briefly returned to the ITF Circuit to participate in the $50k event in Clearwater, Florida where she was the No. 3 seed but was beaten in round one by Japanese Aiko Nakamura. Her next tournament was the first Premier Mandatory tournament of the WTA calendar, the Indian Wells Open where she competed in qualifying but was defeated by Varvara Lepchenko in round one. She then immediately went to her next Premier Mandatory tournament of the calendar, the Miami Open, where she also lost in the qualifying stages.

Her next breakthrough came at the $50k event in Nottingham where she reached the quarterfinals before falling to Stefanie Vögele in three sets. She followed this up with a victory on the WTA Tour at the Birmingham Classic over Katie O'Brien before falling to first seed Zheng Jie. She then lost in qualifying at Eastbourne and in the first round of Wimbledon to Vera Dushevina and Mathilde Johansson respectively. She had little success on the ITF Circuit until a Glasgow $25k event where she reached the final as the second seed. In the final, she fell to Johanna Larsson of Sweden, in three sets.

She ended the year with a singles record of 20–21 and a year-end ranking of 160.

In doubles, South captured two titles in Helsinki and Glasgow, partnering Emma Laine for both titles. She also achieved a first-round win over Alona and Kateryna Bondarenko at Wimbledon, alongside fellow Brit Jocelyn Rae. She ended the year with a doubles record of 12–5.

== ITF Circuit finals ==
=== Singles: 12 (6 titles, 6 runner-ups) ===
| Legend $25,000 tournaments $10,000 tournaments | Finals by surface Hard (6–4) Clay (0–2) |

| Outcome | No. | Date | Tournament | Surface | Opponent | Score |
|---|---|---|---|---|---|---|
| Winner | 1. | 3 March 2004 | ITF Mumbai, India | Hard | (China) Chen Yanchong | 6–4, 6–4 |
| Runner-up | 2. | 1 May 2004 | ITF Bournemouth, United Kingdom | Clay | (Belgium) Elke Clijsters | 6–3, 1–6, 2–6 |
| Winner | 3. | 10 April 2005 | ITF Bath, United Kingdom | Hard | (United Kingdom) Anne Keothavong | 6–4, 4–6, 6–4 |
| Runner-up | 4. | 8 May 2005 | ITF Edinburgh, United Kingdom | Clay | (Russia) Ekaterina Kozhokina | 4–6, 3–6 |
| Winner | 5. | 29 January 2006 | ITF Hull, United Kingdom | Hard (i) | (France) Irena Pavlovic | 6–4, 6–1 |
| Winner | 6. | 30 July 2006 | ITF Chengdu, China | Hard | (China) Lu Jingjing | 7–5, 7–6^{(5)} |
| Winner | 7. | 23 March 2008 | ITF Sorrento, Italy | Hard | (Australia) Christina Wheeler | 7–5, 6–7^{(6)}, 6–4 |
| Runner-up | 8. | 12 October 2008 | ITF Traralgon, Australia | Hard | (Australia) Jarmila Gajdošová | 3–6, 6–3, 1–6 |
| Runner-up | 9. | 19 October 2008 | ITF Mount Gambier, Australia | Hard | (South Africa) Natalie Grandin | 6–7^{(2)}, 4–6 |
| Winner | 10. | 26 October 2008 | ITF Port Pirie, Australia | Hard | (Japan) Yurika Sema | 6–3, 6–4 |
| Runner-up | 11. | 15 November 2008 | Pune Championships, India | Hard | (China) Lu Jingjing | 3–6, 2–6 |
| Runner-up | 12. | 25 October 2009 | GB Pro-Series Glasgow, UK | Hard (i) | (Sweden) Johanna Larsson | 1–6, 6–1, 3–6 |

=== Doubles: 45 (24 titles, 21 runner-ups) ===
| Legend $100,000 tournaments $75,000 tournaments $50,000 tournaments $25,000 tournaments $10,000 tournaments | Finals by surface Hard (18–17) Clay (2–2) Grass (2–1) Carpet (2–1) |

| Outcome | No. | Date | Tournament | Surface | Partner | Opponents | Score |
|---|---|---|---|---|---|---|---|
| Winner | 1. | 1 February 2004 | ITF Tipton, United Kingdom | Hard (i) | (United Kingdom) Rebecca Llewellyn | (Poland) Klaudia Jans (Poland) Alicja Rosolska | 2–6, 6–1, 6–4 |
| Runner-up | 2. | 23 January 2005 | ITF Tipton, United Kingdom | Hard (i) | (United Kingdom) Katie O'Brien | (South Africa) Surina De Beer (United Kingdom) Rebecca Llewellyn | 4–6, 2–6 |
| Runner-up | 3. | 30 January 2005 | ITF Hull, United Kingdom | Hard (i) | (United Kingdom) Katie O'Brien | (Russia) Irena Bulykina (Russia) Vasilisa Davydova | 6–4, 3–6, [5–10] |
| Winner | 4. | 3 April 2005 | ITF Bath, United Kingdom | Hard (i) | (South Africa) Surina De Beer | (Russia) Ekaterina Kozhokina (Australia) Trudi Musgrave | 6–2, 7–5 |
| Winner | 5. | 1 May 2005 | ITF Bournemouth, UK | Clay | (United Kingdom) Claire Peterzan | (United Kingdom) Anna Hawkins (United Kingdom) Holly Richards | 5–7, 6–4, 6–3 |
| Winner | 6. | 8 May 2005 | ITF Edinburgh, UK | Clay | (United Kingdom) Rebecca Llewellyn | (Netherlands) Leonie Mekel (Netherlands) Bibiane Schoofs | 6–0, 3–6, 6–3 |
| Runner-up | 7. | 5 February 2006 | ITF Jersey, UK | Hard (i) | (United Kingdom) Katie O'Brien | (Czech Republic) Andrea Hlaváčková (Croatia) Matea Mezak | 3–6, 1–6 |
| Winner | 8. | 1 October 2006 | ITF Nottingham, UK | Hard (i) | (United Kingdom) Karen Paterson | (United Kingdom) Katie O'Brien (Estonia) Margit Rüütel | 6–2, 2–6, 7–6^{(1)} |
| Winner | 9. | 8 October 2006 | Open Nantes, France | Hard (i) | (United Kingdom) Rebecca Llewellyn | (Germany) Sabine Lisicki (France) Irena Pavlovic | 6–2, 6–0 |
| Runner-up | 10. | 16 February 2007 | ITF Stockholm, Sweden | Hard (i) | (Romania) Sorana Cîrstea | (Montenegro) Danica Krstajić (Russia) Olga Panova | 2–6, 6–0, 2–6 |
| Runner-up | 11. | 17 March 2007 | ITF Gran Canaria, Spain | Hard | (United Kingdom) Claire Curran | (Romania) Sorana Cîrstea (Romania) Mădălina Gojnea | 6–4, 6–7^{(5)}, 4–6 |
| Runner-up | 12. | 30 March 2007 | ITF La Palma, Spain | Hard | (Spain) Arantxa Parra Santonja | (Czech Republic) Petra Cetkovská (Czech Republic) Andrea Hlaváčková | 3–6, 2–6 |
| Winner | 13. | 8 June 2007 | Surbiton Trophy, UK | Grass | (United Kingdom) Karen Paterson | (United Kingdom) Elena Baltacha (United Kingdom) Naomi Cavaday | 6–1, 6–4 |
| Winner | 14. | 14 July 2007 | ITF Felixstowe, UK | Grass | (United Kingdom) Karen Paterson | (United Kingdom) Jade Curtis (United Kingdom) Rebecca Llewellyn | 6–3, 6–3 |
| Winner | 15. | 28 July 2007 | ITF La Coruña, Spain | Hard | (New Zealand) Marina Erakovic | (Czech Republic) Andrea Hlaváčková (Germany) Justine Ozga | 6–1, 4–6, [10–4] |
| Runner-up | 16. | 7 October 2007 | Open Nantes, France | Hard (i) | (Belgium) Caroline Maes | (Sweden) Sofia Arvidsson (Sweden) Johanna Larsson | 6–4, 5–7, [7–10] |
| Winner | 17. | 21 March 2008 | ITF Sorrento, Italy | Hard | (Australia) Monique Adamczak | (Chinese Taipei) Chang Kai-chen (Chinese Taipei) Hwang I-hsuan | 6–2, 6–4 |
| Runner-up | 18. | 4 May 2008 | Kangaroo Cup, Japan | Carpet | (Netherlands) Nicole Thyssen | (Japan) Kimiko Date-Krumm (Japan) Kurumi Nara | 1–6, 7–6^{(8)}, [7–10] |
| Winner | 19. | 11 May 2008 | Fukuoka International, Japan | Carpet | (Netherlands) Nicole Thijssen | (Japan) Maya Kato (Australia) Julia Moriarty | 4–6, 6–3, [14–12] |
| Runner-up | 20. | 9 August 2008 | ITF Monterrey, Mexico | Hard | (Australia) Monique Adamczak | (Croatia) Jelena Pandžić (Slovakia) Magdaléna Rybáriková | 6–4, 4–6, [8–10] |
| Winner | 21. | 29 November 2008 | ITF Toyota, Japan | Carpet (i) | (Finland) Emma Laine | (Japan) Kimiko Date-Krumm (China) Han Xinyun | 6–1, 7–5 |
| Winner | 22. | 3 October 2009 | ITF Helsinki, Finland | Hard (i) | (Finland) Emma Laine | (United Kingdom) Anna Smith (Sweden) Johanna Larsson | 6–3, 6–3 |
| Winner | 23. | 25 October 2009 | GB Pro-Series Glasgow, UK | Hard (i) | (Finland) Emma Laine | (Italy) Evelyn Mayr (Italy) Julia Mayr | 6–3, 6–2 |
| Runner-up | 24. | 22 March 2010 | ITF Jersey, UK | Hard (i) | (Australia) Jarmila Gajdošová | (Estonia) Maret Ani (United Kingdom) Anna Smith | 7–5, 6–4 |
| Runner-up | 25. | 26 May 2010 | Kangaroo Cup, Japan | Clay | (Russia) Ksenia Lykina | (Japan) Erika Sema (Japan) Tomoko Yonemura | 3–6, 6–2, 7–10 |
| Winner | 26. | 14 August 2010 | ITF Tallinn, Estonia | Hard | (Finland) Emma Laine | (China) Lu Jingjing (China) Sun Shengnan | 6–3, 6–4 |
| Runner-up | 27. | 26 October 2010 | ITF Port Pirie, Australia | Clay | (Japan) Remi Tezuka | (Australia) Bojana Bobusic (Australia) Alenka Hubacek | 3–6, 2–6 |
| Winner | 28. | 28 November 2010 | ITF Traralgon, Australia | Hard | (Hungary) Tímea Babos | (Australia) Jarmila Gajdošová (Australia) Jade Hopper | 6–3, 6–2 |
| Winner | 29. | 3 December 2010 | Bendigo International, Australia | Hard | (Hungary) Tímea Babos | (Australia) Jarmila Gajdošová (Australia) Jade Hopper | 6–3, 6–2 |
| Winner | 30. | 4 February 2011 | ITF Sutton, UK | Hard (i) | (Finland) Emma Laine | (Poland) Marta Domachowska (Croatia) Darija Jurak | 6–3, 5–7, [10–8] |
| Runner-up | 31. | 5 March 2011 | ITF Hammond, U.S. | Hard | (Bosnia and Herzegovina) Mervana Jugić-Salkić | (United States) Christina Fusano (United States) Julie Ditty | 3–6, 3–6 |
| Runner-up | 32. | 16 July 2011 | ITF Woking, UK | Hard | (Finland) Emma Laine | (France) Julie Coin (Czech Republic) Eva Hrdinová | 1–6, 6–3, [8–10] |
| Runner-up | 33. | 24 July 2011 | ITF Wrexham, UK | Hard | (Slovakia) Lenka Wienerová | (United Kingdom) Anna Fitzpatrick (United Kingdom) Jade Windley | 2–6, 6–4, [3–10] |
| Winner | 34. | 4 February 2012 | Burnie International, Australia | Hard | (Russia) Arina Rodionova | (Australia) Stephanie Bengson (Australia) Tyra Calderwood | 6–2, 6–2 |
| Winner | 35. | 17 February 2012 | ITF Sydney, Australia | Hard | (Russia) Arina Rodionova | (China) Duan Yingying (China) Han Xinyun | 3–6, 6–3, [10–8] |
| Runner-up | 36. | 19 March 2012 | GB Pro-Series Bath, UK | Hard (i) | (France) Julie Coin | (Germany) Tatjana Maria (Liechtenstein) Stephanie Vogt | 3–6, 6–3, [3–10] |
| Runner-up | 37. | 14 May 2012 | Kurume Cup, Japan | Grass | (Russia) Ksenia Lykina | (China) Han Xinyun (China) Sun Shengnan | 1–6, 0–6 |
| Winner | 38. | 14 January 2013 | GB Pro-Series Glasgow, UK | Hard (i) | (United Kingdom) Tara Moore | (United Kingdom) Anna Smith (United Kingdom) Francesca Stephenson | 7–6^{(5)}, 6–3 |
| Runner-up | 39. | 23 January 2013 | ITF Preston, UK | Hard (i) | (United Kingdom) Tara Moore | (United Kingdom) Samantha Murray (United Kingdom) Jade Windley | 3–6, 6–3, [5–10] |
| Winner | 40. | 4 February 2013 | ITF Rancho Mirage, United States | Hard | (United Kingdom) Tara Moore | (United States) Jan Abaza (United States) Louisa Chirico | 4–6, 6–2, [12–10] |
| Runner-up | 41. | 22 April 2013 | ITF Phuket, Thailand | Hard (i) | (United Kingdom) Tara Moore | (Thailand) Nicha Lertpitaksinchai (Thailand) Peangtarn Plipuech | 3–6, 7–5, [9–11] |
| Runner-up | 42. | 22 July 2013 | ITF Wrexham, UK | Hard | (United Kingdom) Anna Smith | (Japan) Kanae Hisami (Japan) Mari Tanaka | 3–6, 6–7^{(2)} |
| Winner | 43. | 29 July 2013 | ITF Nottingham, UK | Hard | (United Kingdom) Anna Smith | (United Kingdom) Daneika Borthwick (United Kingdom) Anna Fitzpatrick | 6–4, 6–2 |
| Runner-up | 44. | 26 August 2013 | ITF Antalya, Turkey | Hard | (Finland) Emma Laine | (Argentina) Andrea Benítez (Brazil) Carla Forte | 6–4, 3–6, [8–10] |
| Winner | 45. | 2 September 2013 | ITF Antalya, Turkey | Hard | (Finland) Emma Laine | (Thailand) Patcharin Cheapchandej (Thailand) Tanaporn Thongsing | 6–4, 6–3 |

== Grand Slam performance timelines ==
Key
| W | F | SF | QF | #R | RR | Q# | DNQ | A | NH |

(W) winner; (F) finalist; (SF) semifinalist; (QF) quarterfinalist; (#R) rounds 4, 3, 2, 1; (RR) round-robin stage; (Q#) qualification round; (DNQ) did not qualify; (A) absent; (NH) not held; (SR) strike rate (events won / competed); (W–L) win–loss record.

=== Singles ===
| Tournament | 2002 | 2003 | 2004 | 2005 | 2006 | 2007 | 2008 | 2009 | 2010 | 2011 | 2012 | 2013 | Career W–L |
|---|---|---|---|---|---|---|---|---|---|---|---|---|---|
| Australian Open | A | A | A | A | A | Q1 | Q1 | 1R | Q1 | A | A | A | 0–1 |
| French Open | A | A | A | A | A | Q1 | Q1 | 1R | A | A | A | A | 0–1 |
| Wimbledon | Q1 | A | Q1 | Q1 | 2R | 1R | 1R | 1R | 1R | Q2 | Q1 | Q1 | 1–5 |
| US Open | A | A | A | A | Q1 | Q1 | Q3 | Q2 | A | A | A | A | 0–0 |
| Year-end ranking | 931 | 851 | 453 | 449 | 176 | 212 | 116 | 160 | 292 | 299 | 328 | 608 | N/A |

=== Doubles ===
| Tournament | 2005 | 2006 | 2007 | 2008 | 2009 | 2010 | 2011 | 2012 | 2013 | Career W–L |
|---|---|---|---|---|---|---|---|---|---|---|
| Australian Open | A | A | A | A | A | A | A | A | A | 0–0 |
| French Open | A | A | A | A | A | A | A | A | A | 0–0 |
| Wimbledon | 1R | 1R | 1R | 2R | 2R | 1R | 1R | 1R | 1R | 2–9 |
| US Open | A | A | A | A | A | A | A | A | A | 0–0 |

=== Mixed doubles ===
| Tournament | 2007 | 2008 | 2009 | 2010 | 2011 | 2012 | Career W–L |
|---|---|---|---|---|---|---|---|
| Australian Open | A | A | A | A | A | A | 0–0 |
| French Open | A | A | A | A | A | A | 0–0 |
| Wimbledon | QF | 1R | 1R | A | 2R | 3R | 6–5 |
| US Open | A | A | A | A | A | A | 0–0 |

=== Fed Cup ===
Europe/Africa Group I
| Date | Venue | Surface | Round | Opponent | Final match score | Match | Opponents | Rubber score |
| 30–31 January 2008 | Budapest | Carpet (i) | RR | Switzerland | 1–2 | Doubles (with Elena Baltacha) | Gagliardi/Schnyder | 3–6, 3–6 (L) |
| 30–31 January 2008 | Budapest | Carpet (i) | RR | Hungary | 1–2 | Doubles (with Elena Baltacha) | Arn/Szávay | 2–6, 2–6 (L) |
| 4–6 February 2009 | Tallinn | Hard (i) | RR | Hungary | 3–0 | Doubles (with Sarah Borwell) | Marosi/Szávay | 6–4, 6–3 (W) |
| 4–6 February 2009 | Tallinn | Hard (i) | RR | Luxembourg | 3–0 | Singles | Fabienne Thill | 6–0, 6–2 (W) |
| 4–6 February 2009 | Tallinn | Hard (i) | RR | Luxembourg | 3–0 | Doubles (with Sarah Borwell) | Minella/Thill | w/o (W) |
