= Kurumi Nara =

Japanese tennis player (born 1991)

Kurumi Nara 奈良くるみ
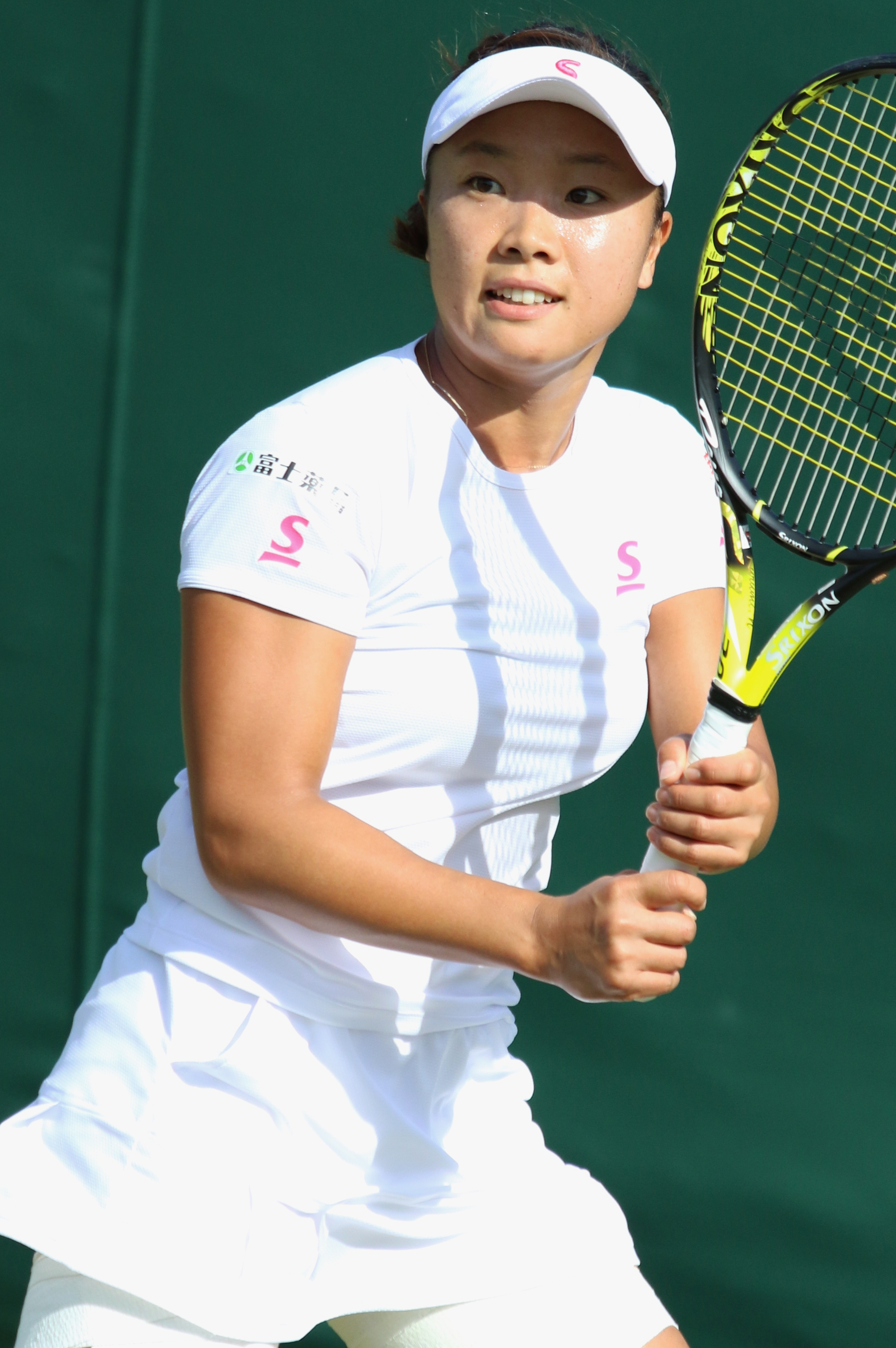
- Nara at the 2017 Wimbledon Championships
- Country (sports): Japan
- Residence: Hyōgo, Japan
- Born: 30 December 1991 (age 34) Osaka, Japan
- Height: 1.55 m (5 ft 1 in)
- Turned pro: April 2009
- Retired: September 2022
- Plays: Right-handed (two-handed backhand)
- Coach: Natsuki Harada
- Prize money: $2,868,337

Singles
- Career record: 385–320
- Career titles: 1 WTA, 7 ITF
- Highest ranking: No. 32 (18 August 2014)

Grand Slam singles results
- Australian Open: 3R (2014)
- French Open: 2R (2014, 2015, 2016, 2017, 2019)
- Wimbledon: 2R (2010, 2014, 2015, 2016)
- US Open: 3R (2013, 2017)

Doubles
- Career record: 51–71
- Career titles: 3 ITF
- Highest ranking: No. 109 (2 May 2016)

Grand Slam doubles results
- Australian Open: 1R (2015, 2016, 2017)
- French Open: 1R (2014, 2015, 2017)
- Wimbledon: 2R (2015)
- US Open: 1R (2014)

Team competitions
- Fed Cup: 12–8

Kurumi Nara (奈良 くるみ, Nara Kurumi; born 30 December 1991) is a Japanese former professional tennis player.

In her career, she won one singles title on the WTA Tour, with seven singles and three doubles titles on the ITF Women's Circuit. On 18 August 2014, she achieved her career-high singles ranking of world No. 32. On 2 May 2016, she peaked at No. 109 in the WTA doubles rankings.

Playing for Japan Fed Cup team, Nara has a win–loss record of 12–8.

== Juniors ==
Nara began playing tennis at the age of three. At the Esaka Tennis Center in Osaka, the budding pro player studied tennis under the tutelage of Japanese tennis luminaries Masaru Suishu and Hiroko Mochizuki. She won recognition from an early age as a tennis prodigy. In 2002, while enrolled in Kawanishi Makinodai Elementary School, Nara took second place in the All Japan Primary School Tennis Championships at the age of ten. She would go on to win that tournament in 2003.

In 2004, after entering the middle school associated with Osaka Sangyo University, Nara won the girls' singles title in the All Japan Middle School Tennis Championship. 2006 marked her debut, via sponsor recommendation, in the All Japan Tennis Championships women's singles draw; however, a first-round loss abruptly ended her tournament run. As a freshman at Osaka Sangyo's high school in 2007, Nara won the Under-18 singles title at the All-Japan Junior Tennis Championships.

In addition to her participation in the major events for her age group, Nara also accumulated victories each year in junior events throughout Japan. She enjoyed success in doubles on the ITF Junior Circuit with partner Misaki Doi, earning entrance to the girls' doubles draw at the Wimbledon Championships in 2007. They placed second overall, becoming only the second Japanese women's doubles pair to reach the finals of a Grand Slam juniors event since Yuka Yoshida and Hiroko Mochizuki at the 1993 US Open. The Nara/Doi team went on to reach the junior doubles semifinals at the 2007 US Open and 2008 Wimbledon Championships, in addition to strong performances at smaller tournaments.

Nara also enjoyed success in singles. In 2007, she became the first Japanese woman to win the Osaka Mayor's Cup since Ryōko Fuda in 2002. Also that year, she made her second appearance, again by sponsor recommendation, in the All Japan Tennis Championships. In the second round, she defeated defending champion and fifth seed, Erika Takao, in straight sets, in the third round, she toppled 11th seed Tomoko Yonemura in three sets, and in the quarterfinals, she lost to Junri Namigata. Nara teamed again with Misaki Doi in doubles, reaching the second round in her tournament doubles debut. The next year, she partnered with Kimiko Date-Krumm to win the Kangaroo Cup in Gifu, and the title at the Hamanako Open. She reached the third round of the 2008 US Open girls' singles tournament, where she lost to Kristina Mladenovic.

== Professional ==
=== 2009–10 ===
Nara turned professional in April 2009, winning the All Japan Tennis Championships that same year. She advanced to the main draw of a Grand Slam tournament for the first time at the 2010 French Open with a three set win over Monica Niculescu in the qualifiers. At four hours and 42 minutes, it was said to be the longest women's Grand Slam qualifier or main-draw match in history. She would go on to lose her first-round match to Arantxa Parra Santonja. She also qualified for Wimbledon, and won her first major main-draw singles match in two sets, over Mariana Duque Mariño. She fell to Li Na in the second round.

=== 2011–13 ===
Nara failed to gain entrance to the four Grand Slam tournaments in 2011, falling in the qualifiers each time. July marked Nara's first appearance representing Japan in Fed Cup competition; she notched a win in doubles with partner Rika Fujiwara in the playoffs against Argentina. Although she was again unable to pass the qualifying rounds of the year's Grand Slam events, Nara bested Polona Hercog and Eleni Daniilidou to qualify for the Pan Pacific Open in Tokyo in 2012. She was defeated in the first round by Urszula Radwańska. Nara won three qualifying matches to enter the main draw of the 2013 US Open, winning her first-round match against Alexandra Cadanțu. She advanced to the third round of a Grand Slam tournament for the first time, with a straight-set upset victory over 19th-seeded Sorana Cîrstea. She lost to Jelena Janković in the third round. After four early exits in Tashkent, Guangzhou, Tokyo and Beijing, Nara regained some form in her home city at the Japan Women's Open. She would make it to the semifinals of the tournament but was ousted by Eugenie Bouchard, losing in straight sets.

=== 2014: First singles title, top 50 ranking ===
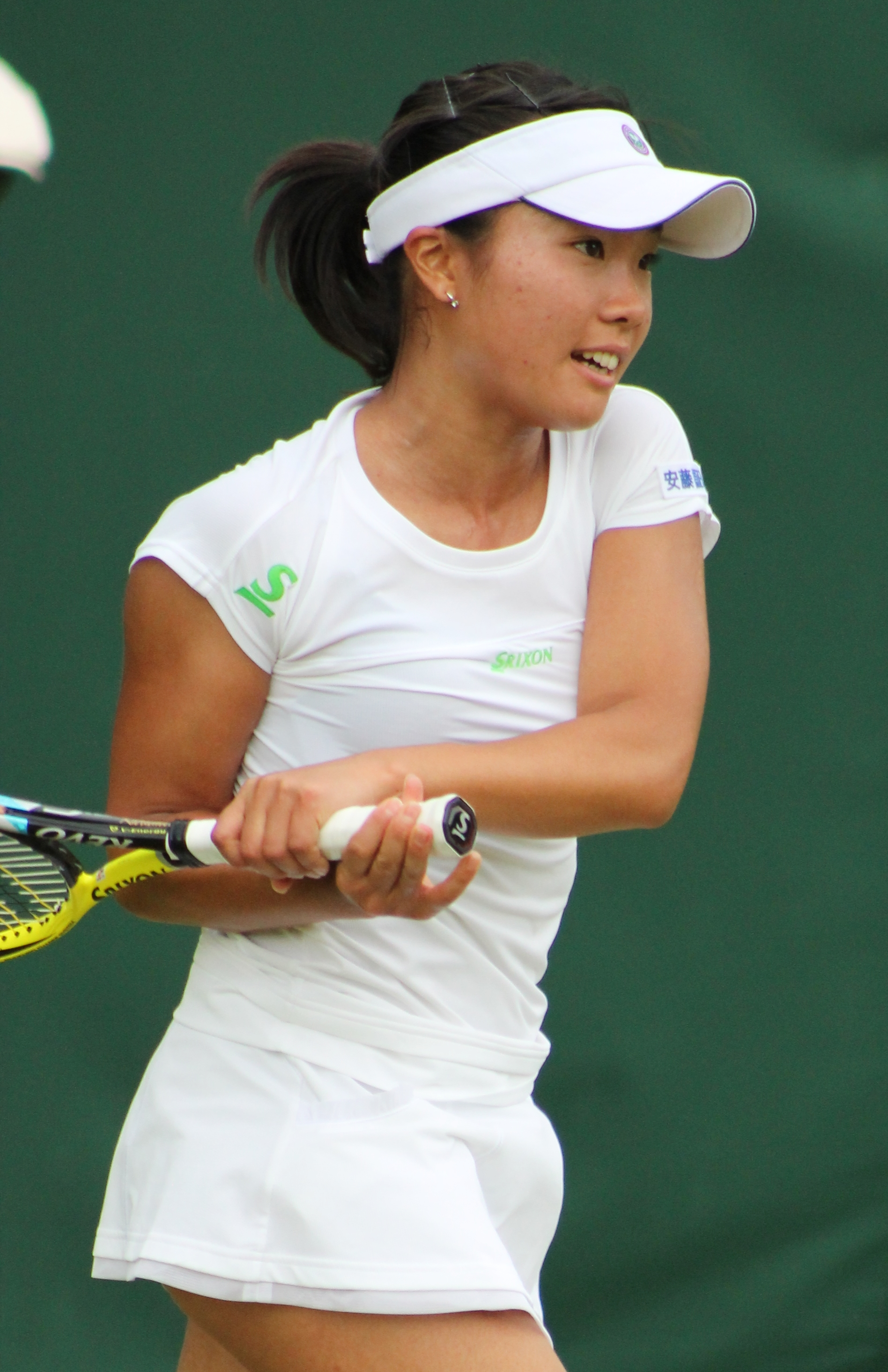
Nara at the 2014 Wimbledon Championships

Nara started season in New Zealand at the Auckland Open. She made it to the quarterfinals where she lost to second seed and eventual champion, Ana Ivanovic. At the Australian Open, she was defeated in the third round by eighth seed Jelena Janković.

In early February, Nara competed in Fed Cup competition for Japan against Argentina in Buenos Aires. She lost the opening singles match to María Irigoyen, and also lost the reverse singles to Paula Ormaechea.

Later the same month, Nara, seeded fifth at the first edition of the Rio Open, won her first WTA Tour title beating top seeded Klára Zakopalová in the final. The win helped her break into the top 50 at No. 48.

At the Indian Wells Open, Nara was defeated in the second round by sixth seed Simona Halep. In Miami, she lost to fourth seed Maria Sharapova in the second round.

In April, she again played in Fed Cup, this time against the Netherlands. She won the opening singles match against Arantxa Rus, but was defeated by Kiki Bertens in the reverse singles match. Her next match was a disappointing first-round loss at the Portugal Open to qualifier Irina-Camelia Begu. Another first-round loss came against Peng Shuai at the Madrid Open. In a rematch from the Fed Cup, Nara again was defeated by lucky loser Paula Ormaechea in her first-round match at the Italian Open. Seeded sixth at the Nürnberger Versicherungscup, she lost in the second round to Yaroslava Shvedova. At the French Open, she was defeated in the second round by sixth seed Jelena Janković.

Nara started her grass-court season at the Birmingham Classic. For the second consecutive year, she lost to British wildcard Johanna Konta in the first round. Nara was defeated in the first round of the Rosmalen Open by Elina Svitolina. At Wimbledon, she reached the second round where she lost to 30th seed, five-time Wimbledon champion, and former world No. 1, Venus Williams.

Seeded sixth at the İstanbul Cup, Nara made it to the quarterfinals where she was defeated by second seed and eventual finalist Roberta Vinci. Seeded fourth at the Baku Cup, she fell in the first round to Francesca Schiavone.

Beginning the US Open Series at the Washington Open, Nara reached the final where she lost to sixth seed Svetlana Kuznetsova. Partnering with Hiroko Kuwata, they reached the final in doubles and were defeated by the second-seeded team of Shuko Aoyama / Gabriela Dabrowski.

Nara was scheduled to play at the Rogers Cup but withdrew because of a hip injury. At the Cincinnati Open, Nara was eliminated in the second round by fourth seed Agnieszka Radwańska. Playing in her last tournament before the US Open, she lost in the first round at the Connecticut Open to Sam Stosur. Seeded 31st at the US Open, Nara was defeated in the second round by Belinda Bencic.

In September, she lost to eighth seed Carla Suárez Navarro in the first round of the Pan Pacific Open. Competing at the first edition of the Wuhan Open, she was defeated in the first round by Svetlana Kuznetsova. At the China Open, she made it to the second round where she was defeated again by Kuznetsova. Nara was scheduled to be the fourth seed at the Japan Women's Open but withdrew with a respiratory illness.

She ended the year ranked 44.

=== 2015: Top 100 ranking ===
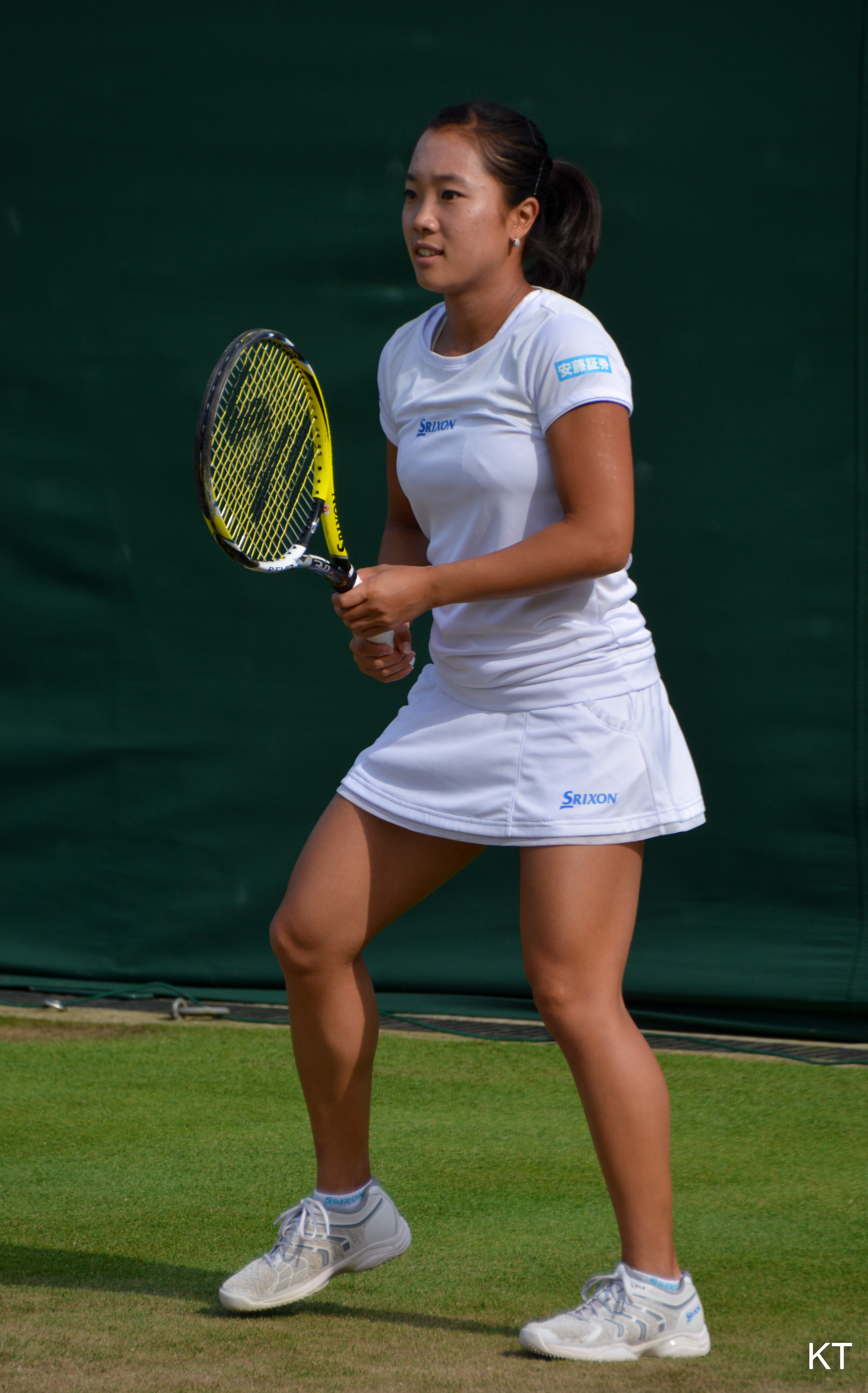
Nara at the 2015 Wimbledon Championships

Nara began season in January at the Auckland Open where she fell in the second round to third seed and eventual champion Venus Williams. At the Hobart International, she reached the semifinals where she was defeated by American qualifier Madison Brengle. Nara lost in the first round of the Australian Open to sixth seed Agnieszka Radwańska.

Seeded fourth at the Thailand Open, she was defeated in the second round by Evgeniya Rodina. At the Dubai Tennis Championships, Nara lost in the first round to qualifier Wang Qiang. Seeded sixth at the Malaysian Open, she reached the quarterfinals where she was defeated by fourth seed Jarmila Gajdošová. Competing at Indian Wells, Nara was eliminated in the first round by qualifier Alison Van Uytvanck. She made it to the third round at the Miami Open where she lost to wildcard Daria Gavrilova.

In the clay-court season at the Morocco Open, she was defeated in the first round by Lara Arruabarrena. She suffered a first-round loss at the Madrid Open to Irina-Camelia Begu. Playing in Rome, she was defeated in the first round of qualifying by Daria Gavrilova. Seeded seventh at the Nürnberger Versicherungscup, Nara reached the quarterfinals where she lost to fourth seed and eventual finalist, Roberta Vinci. At the French Open, she was defeated in the second round by 13th seed and eventual finalist, Lucie Šafářová.

Nara played three grass-court tournaments before Wimbledon. At the Rosmalen Championships, she lost in the second round to seventh seed Kristina Mladenovic. Nara was defeated in her first-round match in Birmingham by Kateřina Siniaková. In Eastbourne, she lost in the final round of qualifying to Alexandra Dulgheru. At Wimbledon, she was defeated in the second round by second seed and two-time champion Petra Kvitová.

After Wimbledon, Nara played at the İstanbul Cup and lost in the second round to eighth seed Tsvetana Pironkova. Seeded fourth at the Baku Cup, she was defeated in round one by qualifier Olga Savchuk.

Nara got her US Open preparations underway at the Washington Open. After reaching the final the year before, she fell in the first round to Yulia Putintseva. In Cincinnati, she retired in her final round of qualifying against Putintseva. At the US Open, Nara upset 27th seed Alizé Cornet in the first round and lost in the second to American qualifier Shelby Rogers.

=== 2022: Retirement ===
The final tournament of her career was the Pan Pacific Open in September where she competed as a qualifying wildcard and lost in the second round to Isabella Shinikova.

== Playing style ==
Kurumi Nara rarely wins points outright. Instead, she plays a patient game and tends to edge into points, gradually increasing the angle and/or power of her shots, and prefers a punishing forehand or volley to close the point out. Her patience is also reflected in her serve, which (especially for her size) has quite a high ball toss. Her serve lacks the punch of players like Serena Williams or Maria Sharapova, but depends on placement and spin. Her short stature has definitely shaped her play style which, while aggressive, does not emphasize power, but more swinging the momentum in her favour and finishing the point off. Her strong forehand is her main weapon.

== Equipment ==
Nara who prefers to play on hardcourts, used a Srixon racquet and Dunlop Sport shoes.

== Performance timelines ==
Key
W	F	SF	QF	#R	RR	Q#	P#	DNQ	A	Z#	PO	G	S	B	NMS	NTI	P	NH

(W) winner; (F) finalist; (SF) semifinalist; (QF) quarterfinalist; (#R) rounds 4, 3, 2, 1; (RR) round-robin stage; (Q#) qualification round; (P#) preliminary round; (DNQ) did not qualify; (A) absent; (Z#) Davis/Fed Cup Zonal Group (with number indication) or (PO) play-off; (G) gold, (S) silver or (B) bronze Olympic/Paralympic medal; (NMS) not a Masters tournament; (NTI) not a Tier I tournament; (P) postponed; (NH) not held; (SR) strike rate (events won / competed); (W–L) win–loss record.
To avoid confusion and double counting, these charts are updated at the conclusion of a tournament or when the player's participation has ended.

Only main-draw results in WTA Tour, Grand Slam tournaments, Fed Cup/Billie Jean King Cup and Olympic Games are included in win–loss records.

=== Singles ===
Current after the 2022 Australian Open.

Tournament	2008	2009	2010	2011	2012	2013	2014	2015	2016	2017	2018	2019	2020	2021	2022	SR	W–L	Win%
Grand Slam tournaments
Australian Open	A	A	Q2	Q3	Q3	Q2	3R	1R	2R	1R	1R	Q2	Q2	Q1	Q1	0 / 5	3–5	38%
French Open	A	A	1R	Q2	Q1	Q2	2R	2R	2R	2R	1R	2R	Q3	Q3	A	0 / 7	5–7	42%
Wimbledon	A	A	2R	Q2	Q1	Q3	2R	2R	2R	1R	1R	Q1	NH	Q1	A	0 / 6	4–6	40%
US Open	A	A	A	Q2	Q2	3R	2R	2R	2R	3R	1R	Q1	1R	Q2	A	0 / 7	7–7	50%
Win–loss	0–0	0–0	1–2	0–0	0–0	2–1	5–4	3–4	4–4	3–4	0–4	1–1	0–1	0–0	0–0	0 / 25	19–25	43%
WTA 1000
Dubai / Qatar Open (Note: The first Premier 5 event of the year has switched back and forth between the Dubai Tennis Championships and the Qatar Ladies Open since 2009. Dubai was classified as a Premier 5 event from 2009 to 2011 before being succeeded by Doha for the 2012–2014 period. In 2015, Dubai regained its Premier 5 status while Doha was demoted to Premier status.)	A	A	A	Q1	Q1	A	A	1R	A	A	A	A	A	A		0 / 1	0–1	0%
Indian Wells Open	A	A	A	A	A	A	2R	1R	3R	1R	1R	A	NH	Q1		0 / 5	3–5	38%
Miami Open	A	A	A	A	A	A	2R	3R	Q1	1R	Q1	A	NH	A		0 / 3	3–3	50%
Madrid Open	NH	A	A	A	A	A	1R	1R	A	A	A	A	NH	A		0 / 2	0–2	0%
Italian Open	A	A	A	A	A	A	1R	Q1	A	A	A	A	A	A		0 / 1	0–1	0%
Canadian Open	A	A	Q1	A	A	A	A	A	A	Q1	A	A	NH	A		0 / 0	0–0	–
Cincinnati Open	NTI	A	Q2	A	A	A	2R	Q2	2R	Q1	Q1	A	A	A		0 / 2	2–2	50%
Pan Pacific / Wuhan Open (Note: In 2014, the Pan Pacific Open was downgraded to a Premier event and replaced by the Wuhan Open.)	Q1	A	1R	A	1R	1R	1R	A	A	A	A	Q2	NH			0 / 4	0–4	0%
China Open	A	A	A	A	A	Q1	2R	A	Q2	A	A	A	NH			0 / 1	1–1	50%
Career statistics
Tournaments	0	1	7	4	3	6	22	22	18	17	14	3	0	2	0	Career total: 119		
Titles	0	0	0	0	0	0	1	0	0	0	0	0	0	0	0	Career total: 1		
Finals	0	0	0	0	0	0	2	0	0	0	0	0	0	0	0	Career total: 2		
Overall win–loss	0–0	1–1	1–7	1–4	1–3	5–6	23–21	19–22	15–17	11–17	0–14	3–3	0–1	3–2	0–0	1 / 119	83–118	59%
Year-end ranking	463	174	131	144	157	76	44	83	78	101	167	144	159	186		$2,868,337		

=== Doubles ===
Tournament	2014	2015	2016	2017	...	2021	SR	W–L
Australian Open	A	1R	1R	1R		A	0 / 3	0–3
French Open	1R	1R	1R	1R		A	0 / 4	0–4
Wimbledon	1R	2R	A	A		A	0 / 2	1–2
US Open	1R	A	1R	A		A	0 / 2	0–2
Win–loss	0–3	1–3	0–3	0–2		0–0	0 / 11	1–11
Career statistics
Year-end ranking	255	148	258	427		873		

== WTA Tour finals ==
Legend
Grand Slam tournaments
Premier M & Premier 5
Premier
International

=== Singles: 2 (1 title, 1 runner-up) ===
Result	W–L	Date	Tournament	Tier	Surface	Opponent	Score
Win	1–0	Feb 2014	Rio Open, Brazil	International	Clay	(Czech Republic) Klára Zakopalová	6–1, 4–6, 6–1
Loss	1–1	Aug 2014	Washington Open, US	International	Hard	(Russia) Svetlana Kuznetsova	3–6, 6–4, 4–6

=== Doubles: 2 (2 runner-ups) ===
Result	Date	Tournament	Tier	Surface	Partner	Opponents	Score
Loss	Aug 2014	Washington Open, United States	International	Hard	(Japan) Hiroko Kuwata	(Japan) Shuko Aoyama (Canada) Gabriela Dabrowski	1–6, 2–6
Loss	Sep 2015	Japan Women's Open, Japan	International	Hard	(Japan) Misaki Doi	(Chinese Taipei) Chan Yung-jan (Chinese Taipei) Chan Hao-ching	1–6, 2–6

== ITF Circuit finals ==
Legend
$100,000 tournaments
$75/80,000 tournaments
$50,000 tournaments
$25,000 tournaments

=== Singles: 13 (7 titles, 6 runner-ups) ===
Result	W–L	Date	Tournament	Tier	Surface	Opponent	Score
Win	1–0	Oct 2008	ITF Hamanako, Japan	25,000	Carpet	(Japan) Chinami Ogi	6–2, 6–3
Loss	1–1	Jun 2009	ITF Komoro, Japan	25,000	Clay	(Japan) Yurika Sema	3–6, 6–1, 4–6
Win	2–1	Aug 2009	ITF Obihiro, Japan	25,000	Carpet	(Japan) Junri Namigata	7–6^{(7)}, 4–6, 6–4
Loss	2–2	Sep 2009	ITF Tsukuba, Japan	25,000	Hard	(Thailand) Suchanun Viratprasert	3–6, 4–6
Loss	2–3	Feb 2010	ITF Surprise, United States	25,000	Hard	(United States) Abigail Spears	1–6, 2–6
Loss	2–4	Jul 2010	ITF Grapevine, US	50,000	Hard	(United States) Jamie Hampton	3–6, 4–6
Win	3–4	Jul 2010	Lexington Challenger, US	50,000	Hard	(Canada) Stéphanie Dubois	6–4, 6–4
Loss	3–5	Aug 2011	Beijing Challenger, China	75,000	Hard	(Chinese Taipei) Hsieh Su-wei	2–6, 2–6
Win	4–5	Oct 2011	ITF Grapevine, US	50,000	Hard	(Kazakhstan) Sesil Karatantcheva	1–6, 6–0, 6–3
Win	5–5	Jul 2013	ITF Portland, US	50,000	Clay	(United States) Alison Riske	3–6, 6–3, 6–3
Loss	5–6	Feb 2018	Rancho Santa Fe Open, US	25,000	Hard	(United States) Asia Muhammad	4–6, 6–2, 6–7^{(3)}
Win	6–6	May 2018	Kangaroo Cup, Japan	80,000	Hard	(Japan) Moyuka Uchijima	6–2, 7–6^{(4)}
Win	7–6	Jun 2022	ITF Changwon, South Korea	25,000	Hard	(South Korea) Han Na-lae	6–3, 6–1

=== Doubles: 7 (3 titles, 4 runner-ups) ===
Result	W–L	Date	Tournament	Tier	Surface	Partner	Opponents	Score
Win	1–0	May 2008	Kangaroo Cup, Japan	50,000	Carpet	(Japan) Kimiko Date	(United Kingdom) Melanie South (Netherlands) Nicole Thyssen	6–1, 6–7^{(8)}, [10–7]
Win	2–0	Jul 2008	ITF Miyazaki, Japan	25,000	Carpet	(Japan) Misaki Doi	(Japan) Kimiko Date (Japan) Tomoko Yonemura	4–6, 6–3, [10–7]
Loss	2–1	May 2009	Kangaroo Cup, Japan	50,000	Carpet	(Japan) Misaki Doi	(Australia) Sophie Ferguson (Japan) Aiko Nakamura	2–6, 1–6
Loss	2–2	Aug 2009	ITF Obihiro, Japan	25,000	Carpet	(Japan) Rika Fujiwara	(Japan) Natsumi Hamamura (Japan) Ayumi Oka	6–3, 1–6, [5–10]
Win	3–2	Sep 2009	ITF Makinohara, Japan	25,000	Carpet	(Japan) Erika Sema	(Japan) Mari Tanaka (Japan) Tomoko Yonemura	6–0, 6–0
Loss	3–3	May 2013	Open Saint-Gaudens, France	50,000	Clay	(Canada) Stéphanie Dubois	(Israel) Julia Glushko (Argentina) Paula Ormaechea	5–7, 6–7^{(11)}
Loss	3–4	Nov 2015	Tokyo Open, Japan	100,000	Hard	(Japan) Eri Hozumi	(Japan) Shuko Aoyama (Japan) Makoto Ninomiya	6–3, 2–6, [7–10]

== Head to head ==
=== Wins over top-10 players ===
#	Player	Rank	Event	Surface	Round	Score
2017
1.	(Russia) Svetlana Kuznetsova	No. 8	US Open	Hard	2R	6–3, 3–6, 6–3
