= Ellen Barry (tennis) =

New Zealand tennis player

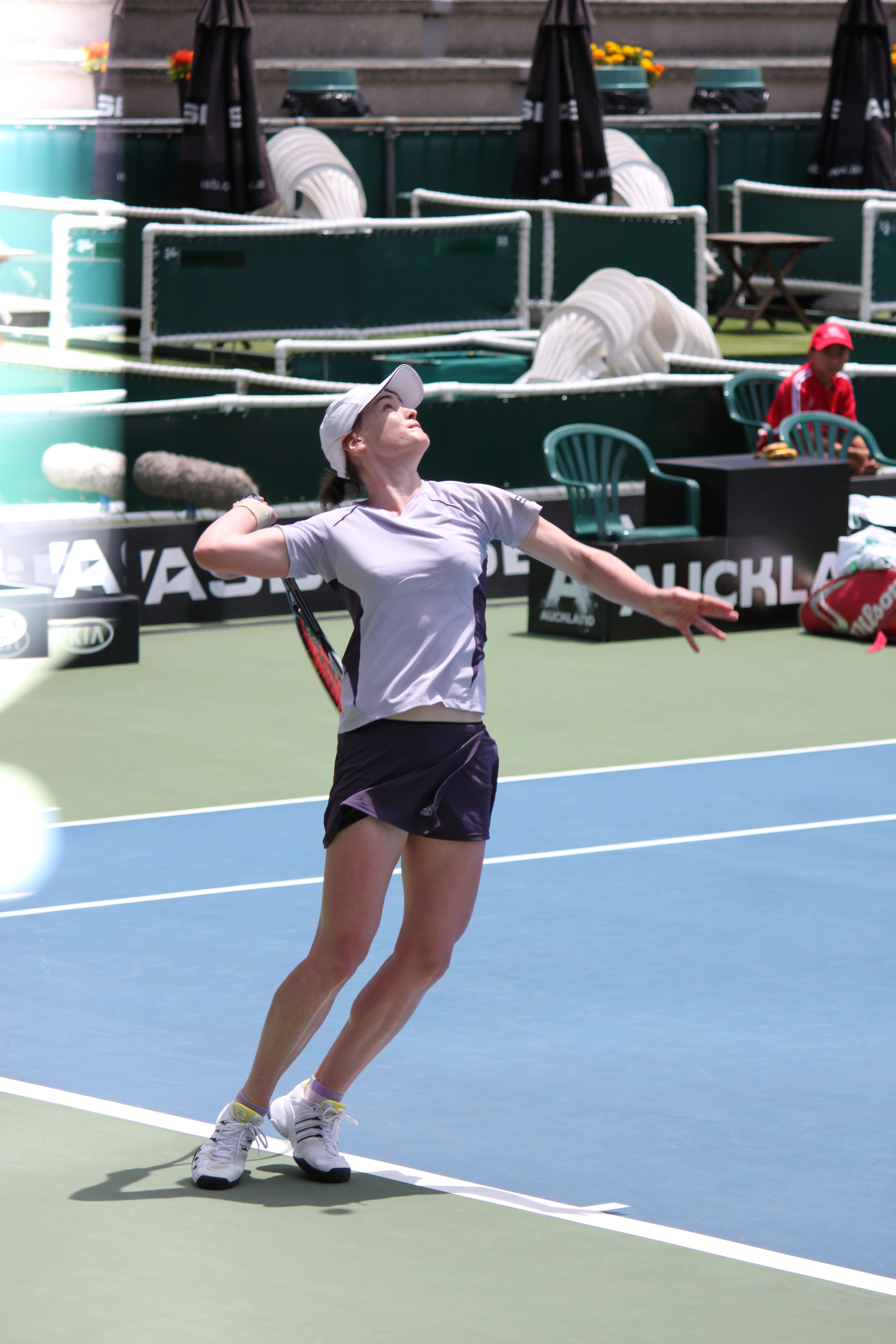
- Country (sports): New Zealand
- Residence: Christchurch, New Zealand
- Born: 12 February 1989 (age 36); Christchurch
- Height: 1.73 m (5 ft 8 in)
- Plays: Right (two-handed backhand)
- Prize money: $31,047

Singles
- Career record: 96–64
- Career titles: 0 WTA, 1 ITF
- Highest ranking: No. 253 (26 May 2008)

Doubles
- Career record: 16–18
- Career titles: 0
- Highest ranking: No. 467 (23 June 2008)

Team competitions
- Fed Cup: 3–2

Ellen Barry (born 12 February 1989 in Christchurch) is a New Zealand former professional tennis player.

Her career-high WTA singles ranking is 253, which she reached on 26 May 2008, best doubles ranking is 467, achieved on 23 June 2008. Barry won one singles title on the ITF Women's Circuit.

== ITF Circuit finals ==
$25,000 tournaments
$10,000 tournaments

=== Singles (1–2) ===
Result	Date	Location	Surface	Opponent	Score
Win	9 March 2008	Hamilton, New Zealand	Hard	(Australia) Anna Wishink	6–7^{(1–7)}, 6–1, 6–4
Loss	16 March 2008	Kalgoorlie, Australia	Hard	(China) Zhou Yimiao	5–7, 2–6
Loss	16 August 2010	Innsbruck, Austria	Clay	(Switzerland) Amra Sadiković	4–6, 2–6

=== Doubles (0–1) ===
Result	Date	Location	Surface	Partnering	Opponents	Score
Loss	12 February 2006	Wellington, New Zealand	Hard	(New Zealand) Leanne Baker	(New Zealand) Paula Marama (New Zealand) Kairangi Vano	3–6, 1–6
