= Nicole Thyssen =

Dutch tennis player

- Country (sports): Netherlands
- Born: 5 June 1988 (age 38) Delft, Netherlands
- Turned pro: 2005
- Retired: 2010
- Plays: Right-handed (two-handed both sides)
- Prize money: $56,062

Singles
- Career record: 108–74
- Career titles: 5 ITF
- Highest ranking: No. 219 (29 September 2008)

Doubles
- Career record: 112–33
- Career titles: 18 ITF
- Highest ranking: No. 153 (27 October 2008)

Team competitions
- Fed Cup: 10–6

Nicole Thyssen (Dutch: Thijssen; born 5 June 1988) is a Dutch retired tennis player.

In her career, Thyssen won five singles titles and 18 doubles titles on the ITF Women's Circuit. She reached her best singles ranking of world No. 219 in September 2008. Her career-high ranking in doubles is 153, reached in October 2008.

Thyssen made her WTA Tour main-draw debut at the 2008 Rosmalen Open, in the doubles event partnering Arantxa Rus.

== ITF Circuit finals ==
=== Singles: 6 (5 titles, 1 runner-up) ===
$100,000 tournaments $75,000 tournaments $50,000 tournaments $25,000 tournaments $10,000 tournaments	Finals by surface Hard (3–1) Clay (0–0) Grass (1–0) Carpet (1–0)

Result	No.	Date	Tournament	Surface	Opponent	Score
Win	1.	Oct 2005	ITF Porto Santo, Portugal	Hard	(Germany) Justine Ozga	7–6^{(7–4)}, 6–4
Loss	1.	Apr 2006	ITF Bath, United Kingdom	Hard (i)	(United Kingdom) Amanda Keen	3–6, 0–6
Win	2.	Nov 2006	ITF Ramat Hasharon, İsrael	Hard	(Portugal) Neuza Silva	6–2, 6–4
Win	3.	May 2007	ITF Fuerteventura, Spain	Carpet	(Portugal) Neuza Silva	6–2, 6–4
Win	4.	Aug 2008	ITF Coimbra, Portugal	Hard	(United Kingdom) Georgie Gent	6–4, 6–4
Win	5.	Nov 2008	ITF Muzaffarnagar, India	Grass	(India) Sanaa Bhambri	7–6^{(7–3)}, 6–3

=== Doubles: 23 (18 titles, 5 runner-ups) ===
$100,000 tournaments $75,000 tournaments $50,000 tournaments $25,000 tournaments $10,000 tournaments	Finals by surface Hard (12–2) Clay (4–2) Grass (0–0) Carpet (2–1)

Result	No.	Date	Tournament	Surface	Partner	Opponents	Score
Loss	1.	3 July 2005	ITF Heerhugowaard, Netherlands	Clay	(Netherlands) Marrit Boonstra	(Ukraine) Kristina Antoniychuk (Serbia and Montenegro) Ana Veselinović	6–1, 2–6, 5–7
Loss	2.	6 September 2005	ITF Enschede, Netherlands	Clay	(Netherlands) Daniëlle Harmsen	(Netherlands) Kelly De Beer (Netherlands) Eva Pera	4–6, 4–6
Loss	3.	27 September 2005	ITF Benevento, Italy	Hard	(Netherlands) Marrit Boonstra	(Poland) Dorota Hibental (Russia) Alexandra Karavaeva	w/o
Win	1.	26 November 2005	ITF Ashkelon, Israel	Hard	(Netherlands) Marrit Boonstra	(Austria) Verena Amesbauer (Germany) Mariella Greschik	6–3, 6–2
Win	2.	3 December 2005	ITF Ramat HaSharon, Israel	Hard	(Netherlands) Marrit Boonstra	(Spain) Gabriela Velasco Andreu (Turkey) Pemra Özgen	6–2, 6–3
Win	3.	10 December 2005	ITF Raanana, Israel	Hard	(Netherlands) Marrit Boonstra	(Russia) Aleksandra Kulikova (Russia) Natalia Orlova	7–5, 6–3
Win	4.	25 November 2006	ITF Ramat Hasharon, Israel	Hard	(Netherlands) Marlot Meddens	(Russia) Anastasia Poltoratskaya (Russia) Yulia Solonitskaya	6–3, 6–1
Win	5.	18 February 2007	ITF Montechoro, Portugal	Hard	(Netherlands) Marrit Boonstra	(United States) Jessica Lehnhoff (United States) Robin Stephenson	6–3, 3–6, 6–2
Win	6.	25 February 2007	ITF Portimão, Portugal	Hard	(Portugal) Neuza Silva	(United States) Jessica Lehnhoff (United States) Robin Stephenson	6–4, 6–2
Win	7.	26 March 2007	ITF Athens, Greece	Hard	(Portugal) Neuza Silva	(Greece) Anna Koumantou (Turkey) Pemra Özgen	6–2, 6–4
Win	8.	26 May 2007	ITF Fuerteventura, Spain	Carpet	(Portugal) Neuza Silva	(Colombia) Mariana Duque Marino (Brazil) Roxane Vaisemberg	6–1, 6–2
Win	9.	27 October 2007	ITF Mexico City, Mexico	Hard	(Netherlands) Arantxa Rus	(Croatia) Ivana Abramović (Croatia) Maria Abramović	6–0, 6–1
Loss	4.	26 February 2008	ITF Fort Walton Beach, United States	Hard	(Netherlands) Pauline Wong	(United Kingdom) Anna Fitzpatrick (Serbia) Ana Veselinović	6–3, 6–7^{(4–7)}
Loss	5.	4 May 2008	Kangaroo Cup Gifu, Japan	Carpet	(United Kingdom) Melanie South	(Japan) Kimiko Date-Krumm (Japan) Kurumi Nara	1–6, 7–6^{(10–8)}, [7–10]
Win	10.	11 May 2008	Fukuoka International, Japan	Carpet	(United Kingdom) Melanie South	(Japan) Maya Kato (Australia) Julia Moriarty	4–6, 6–3, [14–12]
Win	11.	5 July 2008	ITF Bastad, Sweden	Clay	(Slovakia) Klaudia Boczová	(Germany) Anne Schäfer (Hong Kong) Zhang Ling	6–2, 6–1
Win	12.	27 July 2008	ITF La Coruña, Spain	Hard	(Portugal) Neuza Silva	(Colombia) Karen Castiblanco (Colombia) Paula Zabala	6–2, 6–2
Win	13.	3 August 2008	ITF Vigo, Spain	Hard	(Portugal) Neuza Silva	(Russia) Nina Bratchikova (Portugal) Frederica Piedade	6–2, 6–4
Win	14.	9 August 2009	ITF Rebecq, Belgium	Clay	(Netherlands) Kiki Bertens	(Romania) Patricia Chirea (Italy) Valentina Sulpizio	6–2, 7–5
Win	15.	6 September 2009	ITF Almere, Netherlands	Clay	(Netherlands) Kiki Bertens	(Netherlands) Daniëlle Harmsen (Netherlands) Kim Kilsdonk	4–6, 6–2, [10–4]
Win	16.	30 October 2009	ITF Monastir, Tunisia	Hard	(Netherlands) Elise Tamaëla	(Tunisia) Ons Jabeur (Tunisia) Nour Abbès	6–1, 5–7, [10–4]
Win	17.	6 November 2009	ITF El Menzah, Tunisia	Hard	(Netherlands) Elise Tamaëla	(Poland) Barbara Sobaszkiewicz (Poland) Sylwia Zagórska	6–4, 6–1
Win	18.	11 April 2010	ITF Hvar, Croatia	Clay	(Netherlands) Marlot Meddens	(Netherlands) Leonie Mekel (Liechtenstein) Stephanie Vogt	6–4, 6–1
