= 2017 Empire Slovak Open =

- Date: 15–21 May
- Edition: 9th
- Category: ITF Women's Circuit
- Prize money: $100,000
- Surface: Clay
- Location: Trnava, Slovakia

Champions

Singles
- (Czech Republic) Markéta Vondroušová

Doubles
- (United Kingdom) Naomi Broady / (United Kingdom) Heather Watson
← 2016 ·	Empire Slovak Open	· 2018 →

The 2017 Empire Slovak Open was a professional tennis tournament played on outdoor clay courts. It was the ninth edition of the tournament and part of the 2017 ITF Women's Circuit, offering a total of $100,000 in prize money. It took place in Trnava, Slovakia, from 15–21 May 2017.

== Point distribution ==
Event	W	F	SF	QF	Round of 16	Round of 32	Q	Q2	Q3
Singles	140	85	50	25	13	1	6	4	1
Doubles	140	85	50	25	1	—	—	—	—

== Singles main draw entrants ==
=== Seeds ===
Country	Player	Rank^{1}	Seed
BEL	Yanina Wickmayer	73	1
RUS	Evgeniya Rodina	76	2
RUS	Ekaterina Alexandrova	88	3
JPN	Kurumi Nara	93	4
PAR	Verónica Cepede Royg	103	5
CZE	Markéta Vondroušová	107	6
GBR	Heather Watson	108	7
MNE	Danka Kovinić	109	8

- ^{1} Rankings as of 8 May 2017

=== Other entrants ===
The following players received wildcards into the singles main draw:

- (Slovakia) Vivien Juhászová
- (Slovakia) Viktória Kužmová
- (Slovakia) Tereza Mihalíková
- (Slovakia) Anna Karolína Schmiedlová

The following players received entry into the singles main draw by a protected ranking:

- (United States) Alexa Glatch

The following players received entry into the singles main draw by a junior exempt:

- (Russia) Anastasia Potapova

The following players received entry from the qualifying draw:

- (Russia) Viktoria Kamenskaya
- (Czech Republic) Monika Kilnarová
- (Germany) Antonia Lottner
- (United States) Nicole Melichar

== Champions ==
=== Singles ===
- (Czech Republic) Markéta Vondroušová def. (Paraguay) Verónica Cepede Royg, 7–5, 7–6^{(7–3)}

=== Doubles ===
- (United Kingdom) Naomi Broady / (United Kingdom) Heather Watson def. (Chinese Taipei) Chuang Chia-jung / (Czech Republic) Renata Voráčová, 6–3, 6–2
