= 2023 Empire Slovak Open =

Tennis tournament

- Date: 8–14 May 2023
- Edition: 12th
- Category: ITF Women's World Tennis Tour
- Prize money: $100,000
- Surface: Clay / Outdoor
- Location: Trnava, Slovakia

Champions

Singles
- (Belgium) Yanina Wickmayer

Doubles
- Amina Anshba / (Czech Republic) Anastasia Dețiuc
← 2019 ·	Empire Slovak Open	· 2024 →

The 2023 Empire Slovak Open was a professional tennis tournament played on outdoor clay courts. It was the twelfth edition of the tournament, which was part of the 2023 ITF Women's World Tennis Tour. It took place in Trnava, Slovakia, between 8 and 14 May 2023.

== Champions ==
=== Singles ===
- (Belgium) Yanina Wickmayer def. (Belgium) Greet Minnen, 6–0, 6–3

=== Doubles ===
- Amina Anshba / (Czech Republic) Anastasia Dețiuc def. (France) Estelle Cascino / (Netherlands) Suzan Lamens, 6–3, 4–6, [10–4]

== Singles main draw entrants ==
=== Seeds ===
Country	Player	Rank	Seed
SVK	Anna Karolína Schmiedlová	96	1
SUI	Viktorija Golubic	108	2
CHN	Yuan Yue	116	3
BEL	Greet Minnen	173	4
JPN	Mai Hontama	180	5
SRB	Natalija Stevanović	186	6
BEL	Yanina Wickmayer	188	7
FRA	Chloé Paquet	192	8

- Rankings are as of 1 May 2023.

=== Other entrants ===
The following players received wildcards into the singles main draw:

- Amina Anshba
- (Slovakia) Kristína Kučová
- (Slovakia) Ela Pláteníková
- (Slovakia) Radka Zelníčková

The following player received entry from a junior exempt:

- (Czech Republic) Lucie Havlíčková

The following players received entry from the qualifying draw:

- (Romania) Ilona Georgiana Ghioroaie
- (Czech Republic) Aneta Kučmová
- Ksenia Laskutova
- (Slovakia) Eszter Méri
- (Switzerland) Conny Perrin
- (Czech Republic) Ivana Šebestová
- (Czech Republic) Anna Sisková
- (Czech Republic) Tereza Smitková

The following players received entry as lucky losers:

- (Slovakia) Irina Balus
- (Slovakia) Sofia Milatová
