= 2017 Empire Slovak Open – Doubles =

Doubles
- 2017 Empire Slovak Open

Final
- Champion: (United Kingdom) Naomi Broady (United Kingdom) Heather Watson
- Runner-up: (Chinese Taipei) Chuang Chia-jung (Czech Republic) Renata Voráčová
- Score: 6–3, 6–2

Events
Singles	Doubles
← 2016 ·	Empire Slovak Open	· 2018 →

Anna Kalinskaya and Tereza Mihalíková were the defending champions, but Kalinskaya chose to participate in Saint-Gaudens instead. Mihalíková partnered with Chantal Škamlová, but they lost in the first round to Chuang Chia-jung and Renata Voráčová.

Naomi Broady and Heather Watson won the title, defeating Chuang and Voráčová in the final, 6–3, 6–2.

== Seeds ==
1. (Switzerland) Xenia Knoll / (United States) Asia Muhammad (quarterfinals)
2. (Serbia) Aleksandra Krunić / (Serbia) Nina Stojanović (quarterfinals)
3. (Chinese Taipei) Chuang Chia-jung / (Czech Republic) Renata Voráčová (final)
4. (United Kingdom) Naomi Broady / (United Kingdom) Heather Watson (champions)

== Draw ==
=== Key ===
- Q = Qualifier
- WC = Wild card
- LL = Lucky loser
- Alt = Alternate
- ITF = ITF entry
- PR = Protected ranking
- SR = Special ranking
- SE = Special exempt
- JE = Junior exempt
- JR = Junior Accelerator Programme entrant
- CO = College Accelerator Programme entrant
- NG = Next Gen Accelerator Program entrant
- w/o = Walkover
- r = Retired
- d = Defaulted

First round
1	(Switzerland) X Knoll (United States) A Muhammad	6	6
(Italy) C Giovine (Slovakia) R Šramková	1	2
(Argentina) M Irigoyen (Belgium) Y Wickmayer	6	6
(Ukraine) L Kichenok (India) P Thombare	0	4
3	(Chinese Taipei) C-j Chuang (Czech Republic) R Voráčová	7^{7}	2	[10]
(Slovakia) T Mihalíková (Slovakia) C Škamlová	6^{4}	6	[5]
WC	(Tunisia) O Jabeur (Ukraine) K Kozlova	6	6
WC	(Slovakia) V Kužmová (Slovakia) AK Schmiedlová	1	0
(United States) N Melichar (United Kingdom) A Smith	6	4	[10]
Alt	(Slovakia) S Jamrichová (Slovakia) L Juríková	2	6	[4]
(Slovakia) M Hončová (Slovakia) V Juhászová	2	0
4	(United Kingdom) N Broady (United Kingdom) H Watson	6	6
(Ukraine) A Fomina (Russia) E Yashina	6	7
(Czech Republic) K Kramperová (Netherlands) R van der Hoek	2	5
WC	(Czech Republic) E Hrdinová (Czech Republic) L Kunčíková	1	4
2	(Serbia) A Krunić (Serbia) N Stojanović	6	6

Quarterfinals
1	(Switzerland) X Knoll (United States) A Muhammad	4	0
(Argentina) M Irigoyen (Belgium) Y Wickmayer	6	6
3	(Chinese Taipei) C-j Chuang (Czech Republic) R Voráčová	3	6	[10]
WC	(Tunisia) O Jabeur (Ukraine) K Kozlova	6	1	[5]
(United States) N Melichar (United Kingdom) A Smith	4	2
4	(United Kingdom) N Broady (United Kingdom) H Watson	6	6
(Ukraine) A Fomina (Russia) E Yashina	6	1	[10]
2	(Serbia) A Krunić (Serbia) N Stojanović	3	6	[8]

Semifinals
(Argentina) M Irigoyen (Belgium) Y Wickmayer	2	2
3	(Chinese Taipei) C-j Chuang (Czech Republic) R Voráčová	6	6
4	(United Kingdom) N Broady (United Kingdom) H Watson	6^{3}	6	[10]
(Ukraine) A Fomina (Russia) E Yashina	7^{7}	3	[3]

Final
3	(Chinese Taipei) C-j Chuang (Czech Republic) R Voráčová	3	2
4	(United Kingdom) N Broady (United Kingdom) H Watson	6	6
