= 2018 Empire Slovak Open – Doubles =

Doubles
- 2018 Empire Slovak Open

Final
- Champions: (Australia) Jessica Moore (Kazakhstan) Galina Voskoboeva
- Runners-up: (Switzerland) Xenia Knoll (United Kingdom) Anna Smith
- Score: 0–6, 6–3, [10–7]

Events
Singles	Doubles
← 2017 ·	Empire Slovak Open	· 2019 →

Naomi Broady and Heather Watson were the defending champions, however Watson chose not to participate, while Broady chose to compete at the 2018 Kurume U.S.E Cup.

Jessica Moore and Galina Voskoboeva won the title after defeating Xenia Knoll and Anna Smith 0–6, 6–3, [10–7] in the final.

== Seeds ==
1. (Switzerland) Xenia Knoll / (United Kingdom) Anna Smith (final)
2. (Switzerland) Viktorija Golubic / (Belgium) Yanina Wickmayer (withdrew)
3. (Croatia) Darija Jurak / (Sweden) Cornelia Lister (first round)
4. (United States) Kaitlyn Christian / (United States) Sabrina Santamaria (quarterfinals)

== Draw ==
=== Key ===
- Q = Qualifier
- WC = Wild card
- LL = Lucky loser
- Alt = Alternate
- SE = Special exempt
- PR = Protected ranking
- ITF = ITF entry
- JE = Junior exempt
- w/o = Walkover
- r = Retired
- d = Defaulted
- SR = Special ranking

=== Draw ===
First round
1	(Switzerland) X Knoll (United Kingdom) A Smith	3	7^{7}	[11]
(United States) I Falconi (Slovakia) M Hončová	6	6^{5}	[9]
(Romania) N Dascălu (Romania) C Dinu	0	5
(Hungary) D Gálfi (Russia) A Potapova	6	7
4	(United States) K Christian (United States) S Santamaria	7^{12}	6
(Hungary) Á Bukta (Slovakia) V Juhászová	6^{10}	1
(Georgia (country)) O Kalashnikova (Montenegro) D Kovinić	6	6
WC	(Slovakia) L Maluniaková (United States) E Siska	4	0
(United States) M Brengle (India) P Thombare	1	1
(Australia) J Moore (Kazakhstan) G Voskoboeva	6	6
WC	(Slovakia) V Kužmová (Slovakia) T Mihalíková	7	3	[16]
3	(Croatia) D Jurak (Sweden) C Lister	5	6	[14]
(Russia) A Fomina (Russia) E Yashina	6	6
WC	(Russia) K Bekker (Netherlands) E Vogelsang	2	3
(Uzbekistan) A Khabibulina (Ukraine) A Vasylyeva	w/o
2	(Switzerland) V Golubic (Belgium) Y Wickmayer

Quarterfinals
1	(Switzerland) X Knoll (United Kingdom) A Smith	5	7^{8}	[10]
(Hungary) D Gálfi (Russia) A Potapova	7	6^{6}	[5]
4	(United States) K Christian (United States) S Santamaria	4	1
(Georgia (country)) O Kalashnikova (Montenegro) D Kovinić	6	6
(Australia) J Moore (Kazakhstan) G Voskoboeva	4	6	[10]
WC	(Slovakia) V Kužmová (Slovakia) T Mihalíková	6	4	[3]
(Russia) A Fomina (Russia) E Yashina	6	6
(Uzbekistan) A Khabibulina (Ukraine) A Vasylyeva	3	2

Semifinals
1	(Switzerland) X Knoll (United Kingdom) A Smith	6	4	[11]
(Georgia (country)) O Kalashnikova (Montenegro) D Kovinić	3	6	[9]
(Australia) J Moore (Kazakhstan) G Voskoboeva	6	6
(Russia) A Fomina (Russia) E Yashina	1	4

Final
1	(Switzerland) X Knoll (United Kingdom) A Smith	6	3	[7]
(Australia) J Moore (Kazakhstan) G Voskoboeva	0	6	[10]
