= 2018 Empire Slovak Open =

- Date: 14–20 May
- Edition: 10th
- Category: ITF Women's Circuit
- Prize money: $100,000
- Surface: Clay
- Location: Trnava, Slovakia

Champions

Singles
- (Slovakia) Viktória Kužmová

Doubles
- (Australia) Jessica Moore / (Kazakhstan) Galina Voskoboeva
← 2017 ·	Empire Slovak Open	· 2019 →

The 2018 Empire Slovak Open was a professional tennis tournament played on outdoor clay courts. It was the tenth edition of the tournament and was part of the 2018 ITF Women's Circuit. It took place in Trnava, Slovakia, on 14–20 May 2018.

== Singles main draw entrants ==
=== Seeds ===
Country	Player	Rank^{1}	Seed
SWE	Johanna Larsson	79	1
SVK	Anna Karolína Schmiedlová	84	2
PAR	Verónica Cepede Royg	88	3
JPN	Kurumi Nara	91	4
USA	Madison Brengle	99	5
SUI	Stefanie Vögele	100	6
BEL	Yanina Wickmayer	101	7
RUS	Ekaterina Alexandrova	102	8

- ^{1} Rankings as of 7 May 2018.

=== Other entrants ===
The following players received a wildcard into the singles main draw:

- (Slovakia) Tereza Mihalíková
- (Slovakia) Lenka Stará
- (Slovakia) Rebecca Šramková
- (Russia) Vera Zvonareva

The following players received entry from the qualifying draw:

- (Poland) Maja Chwalińska
- (Slovakia) Vivien Juhászová
- (Czech Republic) Tereza Martincová
- (Russia) Anastasia Potapova

The following player received entry as a lucky loser:

- (United States) Irina Falconi
- (United States) Claire Liu

== Champions ==
=== Singles ===
- (Slovakia) Viktória Kužmová def. (Paraguay) Verónica Cepede Royg, 6–4, 1–6, 6–1

=== Doubles ===
- (Australia) Jessica Moore / (Kazakhstan) Galina Voskoboeva def. (Switzerland) Xenia Knoll / (United Kingdom) Anna Smith, 0–6, 6–3, [10–7]
