= 2024 Empire Slovak Open – Singles =

Singles
- 2024 Empire Slovak Open

Final
- Champion: (Japan) Moyuka Uchijima
- Runner-up: (Germany) Mona Barthel
- Score: 7–6^{(7–3)}, 6–3

Events
Singles	Doubles
← 2023 ·	Empire Slovak Open	· 2025 →

Yanina Wickmayer was the defending champion but chose not to participate.

Moyuka Uchijima won the title, defeating Mona Barthel in the final, 7–6^{(7–3)}, 6–3.

== Seeds ==
1. (Japan) Mai Hontama (second round)
2. (Japan) Moyuka Uchijima (champion)
3. (Slovenia) Tamara Zidanšek (quarterfinals)
4. (Slovakia) Viktória Hrunčáková (withdrew)
5. (Turkey) Zeynep Sönmez (first round)
6. (Argentina) Martina Capurro Taborda (first round)
7. (Romania) Irina Bara (first round)
8. (Slovenia) Veronika Erjavec (semifinals)

== Draw ==
=== Key ===
- Q = Qualifier
- WC = Wild card
- LL = Lucky loser
- Alt = Alternate
- SE = Special exempt
- PR = Protected ranking
- ITF = ITF entry
- JE = Junior exempt
- w/o = Walkover
- r = Retired
- d = Defaulted
- SR = Special ranking

=== Finals ===
Semifinals
8	(Slovenia) Veronika Erjavec	6	3	4
(Germany) Mona Barthel	4	6	6
Q	(Czech Republic) Julie Štruplová	4	0
2	(Japan) Moyuka Uchijima	6	6

Final
(Germany) Mona Barthel	6^{3}	3
2	(Japan) Moyuka Uchijima	7^{7}	6

=== Top half ===
First round
1	(Japan) M Hontama	6	6
WC	(Slovakia) R Zelníčková	1	2
(North Macedonia) L Gjorcheska	6	6
P Kudermetova	4	4
(China) X Gao	6	6
(Croatia) L Ćirić Bagarić	3	4
(Cyprus) R Șerban	2	6^{3}
8	(Slovenia) V Erjavec	6	7^{7}
LL	(Slovakia) S Drugdová	0	6	2
WC	(Slovakia) N Kročková	6	2	6
Q	(Poland) W Falkowska	6	4	5
WC	(Slovakia) R Jamrichová	4	6	7
(Germany) M Barthel	6	6
WC	(Czech Republic) L Havlíčková	3	4
J Avdeeva	6	6
6	(Argentina) M Capurro Taborda	4	2

Second round
1	(Japan) M Hontama	3	1
(North Macedonia) L Gjorcheska	6	6
(China) X Gao	2	2
8	(Slovenia) V Erjavec	6	6
WC	(Slovakia) N Kročková	7^{7}	3	0
WC	(Slovakia) R Jamrichová	6^{5}	6	6
(Germany) M Barthel	6	6
J Avdeeva	4	0

Quarterfinals
(North Macedonia) L Gjorcheska	3	4
8	(Slovenia) V Erjavec	6	6
WC	(Slovakia) R Jamrichová	3	2
(Germany) M Barthel	6	6

Semifinals
8	(Slovenia) V Erjavec	6	3	4
(Germany) M Barthel	4	6	6

=== Bottom half ===
First round
5	(Turkey) Z Sönmez	6	6^{6}	6^{5}
Q	(Czech Republic) J Štruplová	4	7^{8}	7^{7}
Q	(Czech Republic) V Valdmannová	0	0^{r}
Q	T Prozorova	6	1
(Slovenia) D Jakupović	6	0	5
(Austria) S Kraus	0	6	7
(Romania) C Dinu	4	1
3	(Slovenia) T Zidanšek	6	6
7	(Romania) I Bara	3	4
Q	(Ukraine) A Soboleva	6	6
Q	(Australia) K McPhee	7	0	6^{8}
(Croatia) T Lukas	5	6	7^{10}
Q	(Slovakia) E Méri	6^{5}	6	7
Q	(Croatia) I Primorac	7^{7}	3	5
(Croatia) A Ružić	4	1
2	(Japan) M Uchijima	6	6

Second round
Q	(Czech Republic) J Štruplová	6^{5}	6	6
Q	T Prozorova	7^{7}	4	3
(Austria) S Kraus	3	5
3	(Slovenia) T Zidanšek	6	7
Q	(Ukraine) A Soboleva	6	3	7
(Croatia) T Lukas	4	6	5
Q	(Slovakia) E Méri	4	2
2	(Japan) M Uchijima	6	6

Quarterfinals
Q	(Czech Republic) J Štruplová	6	6^{5}	7
3	(Slovenia) T Zidanšek	4	7^{7}	5
Q	(Ukraine) A Soboleva	6	2	5
2	(Japan) M Uchijima	3	6	7

Semifinals
Q	(Czech Republic) J Štruplová	4	0
2	(Japan) M Uchijima	6	6
