= 2023 Empire Slovak Open – Singles =

Singles
- 2023 Empire Slovak Open

Final
- Champion: (Belgium) Yanina Wickmayer
- Runner-up: (Belgium) Greet Minnen
- Score: 6–0, 6–3

Events
Singles	Doubles
← 2019 ·	Empire Slovak Open	· 2024 →

Bernarda Pera was the defending champion but chose not to participate.

Yanina Wickmayer won the title, defeating Greet Minnen in the final, 6–0, 6–3.

== Seeds ==
1. (Slovakia) Anna Karolína Schmiedlová (second round)
2. (Switzerland) Viktorija Golubic (quarterfinals, retired)
3. (China) Yuan Yue (second round)
4. (Belgium) Greet Minnen (final)
5. (Japan) Mai Hontama (second round)
6. (Serbia) Natalija Stevanović (first round)
7. (Belgium) Yanina Wickmayer (champion)
8. (France) Chloé Paquet (semifinals)

== Draw ==
=== Key ===
- Q = Qualifier
- WC = Wild card
- LL = Lucky loser
- Alt = Alternate
- SE = Special exempt
- PR = Protected ranking
- ITF = ITF entry
- JE = Junior exempt
- w/o = Walkover
- r = Retired
- d = Defaulted
- SR = Special ranking

=== Finals ===
Semifinals
JE	(Czech Republic) Lucie Havlíčková	4	4
4	(Belgium) Greet Minnen	6	6
8	(France) Chloé Paquet	2	6	4
7	(Belgium) Yanina Wickmayer	6	4	6

Final
4	(Belgium) Greet Minnen	0	3
7	(Belgium) Yanina Wickmayer	6	6

=== Top half ===
First round
1	(Slovakia) AK Schmiedlová	6	6
WC	(Slovakia) E Pláteníková	0	1
Q	(Romania) IG Ghioroaie	3	4
JE	(Czech Republic) L Havlíčková	6	6
(Slovakia) R Šramková	2	2
(Ukraine) K Zavatska	6	6
S Lansere	3	7^{7}	1
5	(Japan) M Hontama	6	6^{0}	6
4	(Belgium) G Minnen	6	6
Q	(Czech Republic) A Kučmová	4	4
I Shymanovich	5	7^{7}	7
Q	(Czech Republic) T Smitková	7	6^{1}	5
T Prozorova	2	2
(United States) E Kalieva	6	6
(Netherlands) S Lamens	4	7^{7}	6
6	(Serbia) N Stevanović	6	6^{3}	0

Second round
1	(Slovakia) AK Schmiedlová	5	2
JE	(Czech Republic) L Havlíčková	7	6
(Ukraine) K Zavatska	6	6
5	(Japan) M Hontama	2	2
4	(Belgium) G Minnen	6	0	6
I Shymanovich	4	6	3
(United States) E Kalieva	4	0
(Netherlands) S Lamens	6	6

Quarterfinals
JE	(Czech Republic) L Havlíčková	4	6	6
(Ukraine) K Zavatska	6	3	4
4	(Belgium) G Minnen	6	6
(Netherlands) S Lamens	4	0

Semifinals
JE	(Czech Republic) L Havlíčková	4	4
4	(Belgium) G Minnen	6	6

=== Bottom half ===
First round
8	(France) C Paquet	6	6
WC	(Slovakia) R Zelníčková	4	2
Q	(Czech Republic) I Šebestová	6	6
WC	A Anshba	4	3
K Dmitruk	6	6
LL	(Slovakia) S Milatová	2	1
Q	(Slovakia) E Méri	3	4
3	(China) Y Yuan	6	6
7	(Belgium) Y Wickmayer	6	5	6
Q	(Switzerland) C Perrin	1	7	4
WC	(Slovakia) K Kučová	6	7^{7}
LL	(Slovakia) I Balus	4	6^{3}
Q	(Czech Republic) A Sisková	6	2	6
K Laskutova	1	6	3
(Czech Republic) B Palicová	3	2
2	(Switzerland) V Golubic	6	6

Second round
8	(France) C Paquet	4	6	6
Q	(Czech Republic) I Šebestová	6	3	2
K Dmitruk	6	6
3	(China) Y Yuan	3	1
7	(Belgium) Y Wickmayer	1	6	4
WC	(Slovakia) K Kučová	6	0	0^{r}
Q	(Czech Republic) A Sisková	6^{5}	2
2	(Switzerland) V Golubic	7^{7}	6

Quarterfinals
8	(France) C Paquet	6	6
K Dmitruk	4	4
7	(Belgium) Y Wickmayer	4	6	3
2	(Switzerland) V Golubic	6	3	1^{r}

Semifinals
8	(France) C Paquet	2	6	4
7	(Belgium) Y Wickmayer	6	4	6
