= 2023 Empire Slovak Open – Doubles =

Doubles
- 2023 Empire Slovak Open

Final
- Champions: Amina Anshba (Czech Republic) Anastasia Dețiuc
- Runners-up: (France) Estelle Cascino (Netherlands) Suzan Lamens
- Score: 6–3, 4–6, [10–4]

Events
Singles	Doubles
← 2019 ·	Empire Slovak Open	· 2024 →

Anna Blinkova and Xenia Knoll were the defending champions but chose not to participate.

Amina Anshba and Anastasia Dețiuc won the title, defeating Estelle Cascino and Suzan Lamens in the final, 6–3, 4–6, [10–4].

== Seeds ==
1. (Brazil) Ingrid Gamarra Martins / Iryna Shymanovich (quarterfinals)
2. Amina Anshba / (Czech Republic) Anastasia Dețiuc (champions)
3. (United Kingdom) Freya Christie / (United Kingdom) Ali Collins (semifinals)
4. Alena Fomina-Klotz / (Netherlands) Bibiane Schoofs (first round)

== Draw ==
=== Key ===
- Q = Qualifier
- WC = Wild card
- LL = Lucky loser
- Alt = Alternate
- SE = Special exempt
- PR = Protected ranking
- ITF = ITF entry
- JE = Junior exempt
- w/o = Walkover
- r = Retired
- d = Defaulted
- SR = Special ranking

First round
1	(Brazil) I Gamarra Martins; I Shymanovich	6	6
S Lansere (Slovakia) R Šramková	4	2
(France) E Cascino (Netherlands) S Lamens	6	6
(Japan) M Hontama (Japan) E Hozumi	4	3
3	(United Kingdom) F Christie (United Kingdom) A Collins	6	1	[10]
(Czech Republic) L Havlíčková (Czech Republic) R Voráčová	4	6	[7]
WC	(Slovakia) L Cíleková (Slovakia) E Pláteníková	1	2
(United Kingdom) E Appleton (Germany) J Lohoff	6	6
WC	(Czech Republic) B Palicová (Slovakia) R Zelníčková	6	6^{4}	[10]
WC	(Slovakia) Z Feltsan Kučová (Slovakia) K Kučová	4	7^{7}	[5]
(Belgium) Y Wickmayer (Ukraine) K Zavatska	6	7
4	A Fomina-Klotz (Netherlands) B Schoofs	4	5
(Colombia) Y Lizarazo (India) P Thombare	6	3	[0]
(Romania) IG Ghioroaie (Serbia) N Stevanović	1	6	[10]
(Switzerland) C Perrin (Czech Republic) A Sisková	7^{7}	2	[10]
2	A Anshba (Czech Republic) A Dețiuc	6^{4}	6	[12]

Quarterfinals
1	(Brazil) I Gamarra Martins; I Shymanovich	6^{4}	2
(France) E Cascino (Netherlands) S Lamens	7^{7}	6
3	(United Kingdom) F Christie (United Kingdom) A Collins	w/o
(United Kingdom) E Appleton (Germany) J Lohoff
WC	(Czech Republic) B Palicová (Slovakia) R Zelníčková	0	3
(Belgium) Y Wickmayer (Ukraine) K Zavatska	6	6
(Romania) IG Ghioroaie (Serbia) N Stevanović	6^{4}	2
2	A Anshba (Czech Republic) A Dețiuc	7^{7}	6

Semifinals
(France) E Cascino (Netherlands) S Lamens	6	1	[10]
3	(United Kingdom) F Christie (United Kingdom) A Collins	2	6	[7]
(Belgium) Y Wickmayer (Ukraine) K Zavatska	3	2
2	A Anshba (Czech Republic) A Dețiuc	6	6

Final
(France) E Cascino (Netherlands) S Lamens	3	6	[4]
2	A Anshba (Czech Republic) A Dețiuc	6	4	[10]
