= 2017 Empire Slovak Open – Singles =

Singles
- 2017 Empire Slovak Open

Final
- Champion: (Czech Republic) Markéta Vondroušová
- Runner-up: (Paraguay) Verónica Cepede Royg
- Score: 7–5, 7–6^{(7–3)}

Events
Singles	Doubles
← 2016 ·	Empire Slovak Open	· 2018 →

Kateřina Siniaková was the defending champion, but chose to participate at the 2017 Internazionali BNL d'Italia instead.

Markéta Vondroušová won the title, defeating Verónica Cepede Royg in the final, 7–5, 7–6^{(7–3)}.

== Seeds ==
1. (Belgium) Yanina Wickmayer (quarterfinals)
2. (Russia) Evgeniya Rodina (second round; withdrew)
3. (Russia) Ekaterina Alexandrova (semifinals; retired)
4. (Japan) Kurumi Nara (quarterfinals)
5. (Paraguay) Verónica Cepede Royg (final)
6. (Czech Republic) Markéta Vondroušová (champion)
7. (United Kingdom) Heather Watson (quarterfinals)
8. (Montenegro) Danka Kovinić (first round; retired)

== Draw ==
=== Key ===
- Q = Qualifier
- WC = Wild card
- LL = Lucky loser
- Alt = Alternate
- SE = Special exempt
- PR = Protected ranking
- ITF = ITF entry
- JE = Junior exempt
- w/o = Walkover
- r = Retired
- d = Defaulted
- SR = Special ranking

=== Finals ===
Semifinals
6	(Czech Republic) Markéta Vondroušová	6	2
3	(Russia) Ekaterina Alexandrova	0	1^{r}
5	(Paraguay) Verónica Cepede Royg	6	6^{4}	7
JE	(Russia) Anastasia Potapova	2	7^{7}	5

Final
6	(Czech Republic) Markéta Vondroušová	7	7^{7}
5	(Paraguay) Verónica Cepede Royg	5	6^{3}

=== Top half ===
First round
1	(Belgium) Y Wickmayer	6	7
Q	(Czech Republic) M Kilnarová	4	5
(Germany) T Korpatsch	7^{7}	7
(Austria) B Haas	6^{4}	5
(Belgium) A Van Uytvanck	6	6
(Czech Republic) T Martincová	4	0
WC	(Slovakia) T Mihalíková	0	1
6	(Czech Republic) M Vondroušová	6	6
3	(Russia) E Alexandrova	6	1	6
WC	(Slovakia) AK Schmiedlová	3	6	2
Q	(Germany) A Lottner	6^{4}	3
(Tunisia) O Jabeur	7^{7}	6
(United States) A Muhammad	3	6	6^{2}
WC	(Slovakia) V Kužmová	6	3	7^{7}
(Bulgaria) V Tomova	1	3
7	(United Kingdom) H Watson	6	6

Second round
1	(Belgium) Y Wickmayer	6	3	6
(Germany) T Korpatsch	4	6	1
(Belgium) A Van Uytvanck	4	3
6	(Czech Republic) M Vondroušová	6	6
3	(Russia) E Alexandrova	6	4	7
(Tunisia) O Jabeur	2	6	5
WC	(Slovakia) V Kužmová	6	5	3
7	(United Kingdom) H Watson	4	7	6

Quarterfinals
1	(Belgium) Y Wickmayer	2	2
6	(Czech Republic) M Vondroušová	6	6
3	(Russia) E Alexandrova	6	4	6
7	(United Kingdom) H Watson	4	6	2

Semifinals
6	(Czech Republic) M Vondroušová	6	2
3	(Russia) E Alexandrova	0	1^{r}

=== Bottom half ===
First round
5	(Paraguay) V Cepede Royg	6	6
(Slovakia) R Šramková	2	4
Q	(Russia) V Kamenskaya	6	6
(United States) N Gibbs	2	4
Q	(United States) N Melichar	3	4
PR	(United States) A Glatch	6	6
WC	(Slovakia) V Juhászová	1	0
4	(Japan) K Nara	6	6
8	(Montenegro) D Kovinić	1	0^{r}
(Ukraine) K Kozlova	6	3
(United Kingdom) N Broady	2	6	7^{11}
(Serbia) N Stojanović	6	1	6^{9}
(Belarus) O Govortsova	6	3	4
JE	(Russia) A Potapova	2	6	6
(Serbia) A Krunić	2	1
2	(Russia) E Rodina	6	6

Second round
5	(Paraguay) V Cepede Royg	6	6
Q	(Russia) V Kamenskaya	2	4
PR	(United States) A Glatch	3	2
4	(Japan) K Nara	6	6
(Ukraine) K Kozlova	6	2	7^{7}
(United Kingdom) N Broady	2	6	6^{5}
JE	(Russia) A Potapova	w/o
2	(Russia) E Rodina

Quarterfinals
5	(Paraguay) V Cepede Royg	7	6
4	(Japan) K Nara	5	4
(Ukraine) K Kozlova	1	2
JE	(Russia) A Potapova	6	6

Semifinals
5	(Paraguay) V Cepede Royg	6	6^{4}	7
JE	(Russia) A Potapova	2	7^{7}	5
