= 2024 Empire Slovak Open =

Tennis tournament

- Date: 6–12 May 2024
- Edition: 13th
- Category: ITF Women's World Tennis Tour
- Prize money: $60,000
- Surface: Clay / Outdoor
- Location: Trnava, Slovakia

Champions

Singles
- (Japan) Moyuka Uchijima

Doubles
- (Slovenia) Veronika Erjavec / (Slovenia) Tamara Zidanšek
← 2023 ·	Empire Slovak Open	· 2025 →

The 2024 Empire Slovak Open was a professional tennis tournament played on outdoor clay courts. It was the thirteenth edition of the tournament, which was part of the 2024 ITF Women's World Tennis Tour. It took place in Trnava, Slovakia, between 6 and 12 May 2024.

== Champions ==
=== Singles ===
- (Japan) Moyuka Uchijima def. (Germany) Mona Barthel, 7–6^{(7–3)}, 6–3

=== Doubles ===
- (Slovenia) Veronika Erjavec / (Slovenia) Tamara Zidanšek def. (Slovenia) Dalila Jakupović / (United States) Sabrina Santamaria, 6–4, 6–4

== Singles main draw entrants ==
=== Seeds ===
Country	Player	Rank	Seed
JPN	Mai Hontama	118	1
JPN	Moyuka Uchijima	130	2
SLO	Tamara Zidanšek	135	3
~~SVK~~	~~Viktória Hrunčáková~~	~~145~~	~~4~~
TUR	Zeynep Sönmez	161	5
ARG	Martina Capurro Taborda	162	6
ROU	Irina Bara	168	7
SLO	Veronika Erjavec	169	8

- Rankings are as of 22 April 2024.

=== Other entrants ===
The following players received wildcards into the singles main draw:

- (Czech Republic) Lucie Havlíčková
- (Slovakia) Renáta Jamrichová
- (Slovakia) Natália Kročková
- (Slovakia) Radka Zelníčková

The following players received entry from the qualifying draw:

- (Poland) Weronika Falkowska
- (Australia) Kaylah McPhee
- (Slovakia) Eszter Méri
- (Croatia) Iva Primorac
- Tatiana Prozorova
- (Ukraine) Anastasiya Soboleva
- (Czech Republic) Julie Štruplová
- (Czech Republic) Vendula Valdmannová

The following player received entry as a lucky loser:

- (Slovakia) Salma Drugdová
