= 2019 Empire Slovak Open =

- Date: 13–19 May 2019
- Edition: 11th
- Category: ITF Women's World Tennis Tour
- Prize money: $100,000
- Surface: Clay
- Location: Trnava, Slovakia

Champions

Singles
- (United States) Bernarda Pera

Doubles
- (Russia) Anna Blinkova / (Switzerland) Xenia Knoll
← 2018 ·	Empire Slovak Open	· 2023 →

The 2019 Empire Slovak Open was a professional tennis tournament played on outdoor clay courts. It was the eleventh edition of the tournament which was part of the 2019 ITF Women's World Tennis Tour. It took place in Trnava, Slovakia between 13 and 19 May 2019.

== Singles main-draw entrants ==
=== Seeds ===
Country	Player	Rank^{1}	Seed
RUS	Evgeniya Rodina	67	1
USA	Bernarda Pera	84	2
SWE	Johanna Larsson	99	3
SLO	Dalila Jakupović	110	4
GER	Laura Siegemund	111	5
JPN	Misaki Doi	112	6
RUS	Natalia Vikhlyantseva	114	7
JPN	Nao Hibino	118	8

- ^{1} Rankings are as of 6 May 2019.

=== Other entrants ===
The following players received wildcards into the singles main draw:

- (Hungary) Tímea Babos
- (Slovakia) Jana Čepelová
- (Slovakia) Tereza Mihalíková
- (Slovakia) Lenka Stará

The following players received entry from the qualifying draw:

- (Czech Republic) Denisa Allertová
- (Turkey) Başak Eraydın
- (Hungary) Réka Luca Jani
- (Sweden) Cornelia Lister
- (Romania) Laura-Ioana Paar
- (Australia) Ellen Perez
- (Brazil) Luisa Stefani
- (Belgium) Kimberley Zimmermann

== Champions ==
=== Singles ===
- (United States) Bernarda Pera def. (Russia) Anna Blinkova, 7–5, 7–5

=== Doubles ===
- (Russia) Anna Blinkova / (Switzerland) Xenia Knoll def. (Sweden) Cornelia Lister / (Czech Republic) Renata Voráčová, 7–5, 7–5
