= 2018 Empire Slovak Open – Singles =

Singles
- 2018 Empire Slovak Open

Final
- Champion: (Slovakia) Viktória Kužmová
- Runner-up: (Paraguay) Verónica Cepede Royg
- Score: 6–4, 1–6, 6–1

Events
Singles	Doubles
← 2017 ·	Empire Slovak Open	· 2019 →

Markéta Vondroušová was the defending champion, but chose not to participate.

Viktória Kužmová won the title after defeating Verónica Cepede Royg 6–4, 1–6, 6–1 in the final.

== Seeds ==
1. (Sweden) Johanna Larsson (quarterfinals)
2. (Slovakia) Anna Karolína Schmiedlová (first round)
3. (Paraguay) Verónica Cepede Royg (final)
4. (Japan) Kurumi Nara (quarterfinals)
5. (United States) Madison Brengle (second round)
6. (Switzerland) Stefanie Vögele (second round)
7. (Belgium) Yanina Wickmayer (first round)
8. (Russia) Ekaterina Alexandrova (semifinals)

== Draw ==
=== Key ===
- Q = Qualifier
- WC = Wild card
- LL = Lucky loser
- Alt = Alternate
- SE = Special exempt
- PR = Protected ranking
- ITF = ITF entry
- JE = Junior exempt
- w/o = Walkover
- r = Retired
- d = Defaulted
- SR = Special ranking

=== Finals ===
Semifinals
(Slovakia) Viktória Kužmová	7	5	6
8	(Russia) Ekaterina Alexandrova	5	7	4
3	(Paraguay) Verónica Cepede Royg	6	6
(Russia) Anna Blinkova	3	0

Final
(Slovakia) Viktória Kužmová	6	1	6
3	(Paraguay) Verónica Cepede Royg	4	6	1

=== Top half ===
First round
1	(Sweden) J Larsson	7^{7}	4	6
LL	(United States) C Liu	6^{5}	6	2
Q	(Slovakia) V Juhászová	2	6^{6}
(Switzerland) V Golubic	6	7^{8}
(Slovakia) V Kužmová	6	6
(Tunisia) O Jabeur	1	2
(Russia) E Rodina	6	3	4
5	(United States) M Brengle	3	6	6
4	(Japan) K Nara	7	6
WC	(Slovakia) T Mihalíková	5	3
(Germany) A Petkovic	6	6
(Montenegro) D Kovinić	4	1
(Croatia) J Fett	6	6^{2}	2
(United States) N Gibbs	3	7^{7}	6
WC	(Slovakia) L Stará	6^{0}	2
8	(Russia) E Alexandrova	7^{7}	6

Second round
1	(Sweden) J Larsson	7^{7}	6
(Switzerland) V Golubic	6^{4}	2
(Slovakia) V Kužmová	6	7^{7}
5	(United States) M Brengle	4	6^{1}
4	(Japan) K Nara	6	6
(Germany) A Petkovic	3	2
(United States) N Gibbs	4	4
8	(Russia) E Alexandrova	6	6

Quarterfinals
1	(Sweden) J Larsson	0	6^{4}
(Slovakia) V Kužmová	6	7^{7}
4	(Japan) K Nara	6^{2}	6^{3}
8	(Russia) E Alexandrova	7^{7}	7^{7}

Semifinals
(Slovakia) V Kužmová	7	5	6
8	(Russia) E Alexandrova	5	7	4

=== Bottom half ===
First round
6	(Switzerland) S Vögele	4	6	6
(Germany) T Korpatsch	6	4	1
Q	(Czech Republic) T Martincová	6	4
(Germany) A Lottner	3	0^{r}
Q	(Poland) M Chwalińska	6	6
LL	(United States) I Falconi	1	3
(United States) K Ahn	7	4	1
3	(Paraguay) V Cepede Royg	5	6	6
7	(Belgium) Y Wickmayer	2	4
(Canada) F Abanda	6	6
(Russia) A Blinkova	7^{7}	7
Q	(Russia) A Potapova	6^{3}	5
WC	(Russia) V Zvonareva	4	6	2
(Ukraine) A Kalinina	6	4	6
WC	(Slovakia) R Šramková	7^{7}	7^{7}
2	(Slovakia) AK Schmiedlová	6^{5}	6^{5}

Second round
6	(Switzerland) S Vögele	6	3	4
Q	(Czech Republic) T Martincová	4	6	6
Q	(Poland) M Chwalińska	6^{4}	0
3	(Paraguay) V Cepede Royg	7^{7}	6
(Canada) F Abanda	1	1^{r}
(Russia) A Blinkova	6	3
(Ukraine) A Kalinina	6	6
WC	(Slovakia) R Šramková	2	4

Quarterfinals
Q	(Czech Republic) T Martincová	1	0^{r}
3	(Paraguay) V Cepede Royg	6	3
(Russia) A Blinkova	6^{9}	6	7^{12}
(Ukraine) A Kalinina	7^{11}	3	6^{10}

Semifinals
3	(Paraguay) V Cepede Royg	6	6
(Russia) A Blinkova	3	0
