= 2019 Empire Slovak Open – Singles =

Singles
- 2019 Empire Slovak Open

Final
- Champion: (United States) Bernarda Pera
- Runner-up: (Russia) Anna Blinkova
- Score: 7–5, 7–5

Events
Singles	Doubles
← 2018 ·	Empire Slovak Open	· 2023 →

Viktória Kužmová was the defending champion, but chose to participate at the 2019 Italian Open.

Bernarda Pera won the title, defeating Anna Blinkova in the final, 7–5, 7–5.

== Seeds ==
1. (Russia) Evgeniya Rodina (first round)
2. (United States) Bernarda Pera (champion)
3. (Sweden) Johanna Larsson (first round)
4. (Slovenia) Dalila Jakupović (second round)
5. (Germany) Laura Siegemund (quarterfinals)
6. (Japan) Misaki Doi (first round)
7. (Russia) Natalia Vikhlyantseva (second round)
8. (Japan) Nao Hibino (second round)

== Draw ==
=== Key ===
- Q = Qualifier
- WC = Wild card
- LL = Lucky loser
- Alt = Alternate
- SE = Special exempt
- PR = Protected ranking
- ITF = ITF entry
- JE = Junior exempt
- w/o = Walkover
- r = Retired
- d = Defaulted
- SR = Special ranking

=== Finals ===
Semifinals
(United States) Christina McHale	3	6	3
(Russia) Anna Blinkova	6	4	6
(Paraguay) Verónica Cepede Royg	2	0
2	(United States) Bernarda Pera	6	6

Final
(Russia) Anna Blinkova	5	5
2	(United States) Bernarda Pera	7	7

=== Top half ===
First round
1	(Russia) E Rodina	4	5
(Belgium) G Minnen	6	7
(China) S Peng	6	3	3
(Germany) A Lottner	2	6	6
(United States) C McHale	5	6	7^{10}
Q	(Brazil) L Stefani	7	3	6^{8}
Q	(Czech Republic) D Allertová	7^{7}	6
6	(Japan) M Doi	6^{4}	4
3	(Sweden) J Larsson	3	6	3
Q	(Australia) E Perez	6	0	6
(Poland) M Fręch	6	6^{2}	6
(Slovakia) R Šramková	2	7^{7}	2
(Russia) A Blinkova	7^{7}	6
(Germany) T Korpatsch	6^{3}	2
Q	(Turkey) B Eraydın	3	3
7	(Russia) N Vikhlyantseva	6	6

Second round
(Belgium) G Minnen	4	4
(Germany) A Lottner	6	6
(United States) C McHale	6	0	7
Q	(Czech Republic) D Allertová	2	6	5
Q	(Australia) E Perez	3	3
(Poland) M Fręch	6	6
(Russia) A Blinkova	6	5	6
7	(Russia) N Vikhlyantseva	3	7	3

Quarterfinals
(Germany) A Lottner	2	0^{r}
(United States) C McHale	6	3
(Poland) M Fręch	4	6	5
(Russia) A Blinkova	6	4	7

Semifinals
(United States) C McHale	3	6	3
(Russia) A Blinkova	6	4	6

=== Bottom half ===
First round
8	(Japan) N Hibino	3	6	6
(Czech Republic) T Smitková	6	0	3
Q	(Hungary) RL Jani	1	6	2
(Paraguay) V Cepede Royg	6	2	6
(Hungary) A Bondár	6	6
WC	(Slovakia) T Mihalíková	3	4
Q	(Belgium) K Zimmermann	5	4
4	(Slovenia) D Jakupović	7	6
5	(Germany) L Siegemund	7^{7}	6
Q	(Romania) L-I Paar	6^{3}	3
WC	(Slovakia) L Stará	0	2
WC	(Hungary) T Babos	6	6
(Croatia) T Mrdeža	7	4	6^{3}
WC	(Slovakia) J Čepelová	5	6	7^{7}
Q	(Sweden) C Lister	3	2
2	(United States) B Pera	6	6

Second round
8	(Japan) N Hibino	1	2
(Paraguay) V Cepede Royg	6	6
(Hungary) A Bondár	4	7	6
4	(Slovenia) D Jakupović	6	5	4
5	(Germany) L Siegemund	7	6
WC	(Hungary) T Babos	5	4
WC	(Slovakia) J Čepelová	0	1
2	(United States) B Pera	6	6

Quarterfinals
(Paraguay) V Cepede Royg	6	6
(Hungary) A Bondár	4	2
5	(Germany) L Siegemund	6^{4}	4
2	(United States) B Pera	7^{7}	6

Semifinals
(Paraguay) V Cepede Royg	2	0
2	(United States) B Pera	6	6
