= 2024 Empire Slovak Open – Doubles =

Doubles
- 2024 Empire Slovak Open

Final
- Champions: (Slovenia) Veronika Erjavec (Slovenia) Tamara Zidanšek
- Runners-up: (Slovenia) Dalila Jakupović (United States) Sabrina Santamaria
- Score: 6–4, 6–4

Events
Singles	Doubles
← 2023 ·	Empire Slovak Open	· 2025 →

Amina Anshba and Anastasia Dețiuc were the defending champions but chose to compete in Prague instead.

Veronika Erjavec and Tamara Zidanšek won the title, defeating Dalila Jakupović and Sabrina Santamaria in the final, 6–4, 6–4.

== Seeds ==
1. (Slovenia) Dalila Jakupović / (United States) Sabrina Santamaria (final)
2. (Poland) Weronika Falkowska / (Ukraine) Valeriya Strakhova (semifinals)
3. (Kazakhstan) Zhibek Kulambayeva / (Greece) Sapfo Sakellaridi (semifinals)
4. (Slovenia) Veronika Erjavec / (Slovenia) Tamara Zidanšek (champions)

== Draw ==
=== Key ===
- Q = Qualifier
- WC = Wild card
- LL = Lucky loser
- Alt = Alternate
- SE = Special exempt
- PR = Protected ranking
- ITF = ITF entry
- JE = Junior exempt
- w/o = Walkover
- r = Retired
- d = Defaulted
- SR = Special ranking

First round
1	(Slovenia) D Jakupović (United States) S Santamaria	6	6
(Slovakia) A Polakovičová (Austria) Z Sopkova	1	1
(Slovakia) V Hrunčáková (Slovakia) R Jamrichová	5	4
(Germany) M Barthel (Austria) S Kraus	7	6
3	(Kazakhstan) Z Kulambayeva (Greece) S Sakellaridi	6	6
(Slovakia) L Cíleková (Slovakia) L Svatíková	1	4
(New Zealand) M Barry (Australia) K McPhee	4	6^{6}
(Hungary) RL Jani (Hungary) A Nagy	6	7^{8}
J Avdeeva; P Kudermetova	6	2	[5]
(Slovakia) S Drugdová (Slovakia) K Strešnáková	2	6	[10]
(Ukraine) A Baranovska (Czech Republic) V Valdmannová
4	(Slovenia) V Erjavec (Slovenia) T Zidanšek	w/o
(Czech Republic) L Havlíčková (Slovakia) N Kročková	7^{7}	5	[5]
(Finland) L Hietaranta; T Prozorova	6^{4}	7	[10]
(Romania) C Dinu (Slovakia) R Zelníčková	6^{4}	2
2	(Poland) W Falkowska (Ukraine) V Strakhova	7^{7}	6

Quarterfinals
1	(Slovenia) D Jakupović (United States) S Santamaria	2
(Germany) M Barthel (Austria) S Kraus	0^{r}
3	(Kazakhstan) Z Kulambayeva (Greece) S Sakellaridi	6	4	[10]
(Hungary) RL Jani (Hungary) A Nagy	3	6	[8]
(Slovakia) S Drugdová (Slovakia) K Strešnáková	1	1
4	(Slovenia) V Erjavec (Slovenia) T Zidanšek	6	6
(Finland) L Hietaranta; T Prozorova	6	0	[4]
2	(Poland) W Falkowska (Ukraine) V Strakhova	4	6	[10]

Semifinals
1	(Slovenia) D Jakupović (United States) S Santamaria	6	6
3	(Kazakhstan) Z Kulambayeva (Greece) S Sakellaridi	4	4
4	(Slovenia) V Erjavec (Slovenia) T Zidanšek	3	6	[10]
2	(Poland) W Falkowska (Ukraine) V Strakhova	6	3	[7]

Final
1	(Slovenia) D Jakupović (United States) S Santamaria	4	4
4	(Slovenia) V Erjavec (Slovenia) T Zidanšek	6	6
