= 2019 Empire Slovak Open – Doubles =

Doubles
- 2019 Empire Slovak Open

Final
- Champions: (Russia) Anna Blinkova (Switzerland) Xenia Knoll
- Runners-up: (Sweden) Cornelia Lister (Czech Republic) Renata Voráčová
- Score: 7–5, 7–5

Events
Singles	Doubles
← 2018 ·	Empire Slovak Open	· 2023 →

Jessica Moore and Galina Voskoboeva were the defending champions, but both players chose not to participate.

Anna Blinkova and Xenia Knoll won the title, defeating Cornelia Lister and Renata Voráčová in the final, 7–5, 7–5.

== Seeds ==
1. (Sweden) Cornelia Lister / (Czech Republic) Renata Voráčová (final)
2. (Russia) Anna Blinkova / (Switzerland) Xenia Knoll (champions)
3. (Japan) Nao Hibino / (Australia) Ellen Perez (semifinals)
4. (United States) Sabrina Santamaria / (Brazil) Luisa Stefani (first round)

== Draw ==
=== Key ===
- Q = Qualifier
- WC = Wild card
- LL = Lucky loser
- Alt = Alternate
- ITF = ITF entry
- PR = Protected ranking
- SR = Special ranking
- SE = Special exempt
- JE = Junior exempt
- JR = Junior Accelerator Programme entrant
- CO = College Accelerator Programme entrant
- NG = Next Gen Accelerator Program entrant
- w/o = Walkover
- r = Retired
- d = Defaulted

=== Draw ===
First round
1	(Sweden) C Lister (Czech Republic) R Voráčová	7	2	[10]
(Slovakia) M Hončová (Slovakia) C Škamlová	5	6	[4]
WC	(Slovakia) L Maluniaková (Slovakia) L Stará	4	7^{7}	[5]
WC	(Romania) A Cadanțu (Slovakia) V Juhászová	6	6^{1}	[10]
3	(Japan) N Hibino (Australia) E Perez	7	7^{7}
(Russia) A Fomina (Russia) E Yashina	5	6^{3}
(Romania) L-I Paar (Czech Republic) T Smitková	6	3	[10]
(Romania) E Bogdan (Romania) C Dinu	3	6	[4]
(Hungary) A Bondár (Hungary) P Udvardy	2	2
(Hungary) T Babos (Slovakia) T Mihalíková	6	6
(Canada) S Fichman (Hungary) RL Jani	6	6
4	(United States) S Santamaria (Brazil) L Stefani	2	4
WC	(Hungary) Á Bukta (Russia) E Vishnevskaya	w/o
(Brazil) C Alves (United States) E Halbauer
(Uzbekistan) A Khabibulina (Kyrgyzstan) K Palkina	6	0	[5]
2	(Russia) A Blinkova (Switzerland) X Knoll	2	6	[10]

Quarterfinals
1	(Sweden) C Lister (Czech Republic) R Voráčová	6	6
WC	(Romania) A Cadanțu (Slovakia) V Juhászová	1	2
3	(Japan) N Hibino (Australia) E Perez	7	3	[11]
(Romania) L-I Paar (Czech Republic) T Smitková	5	6	[9]
(Hungary) T Babos (Slovakia) T Mihalíková	3	6^{3}
(Canada) S Fichman (Hungary) RL Jani	6	7^{7}
WC	(Hungary) Á Bukta (Russia) E Vishnevskaya
2	(Russia) A Blinkova (Switzerland) X Knoll	w/o

Semifinals
1	(Sweden) C Lister (Czech Republic) R Voráčová	6	7
3	(Japan) N Hibino (Australia) E Perez	3	5
(Canada) S Fichman (Hungary) RL Jani	2	6	[6]
2	(Russia) A Blinkova (Switzerland) X Knoll	6	4	[10]

Final
1	(Sweden) C Lister (Czech Republic) R Voráčová	5	5
2	(Russia) A Blinkova (Switzerland) X Knoll	7	7
