= Yanina Wickmayer =

Belgian tennis player (born 1989)

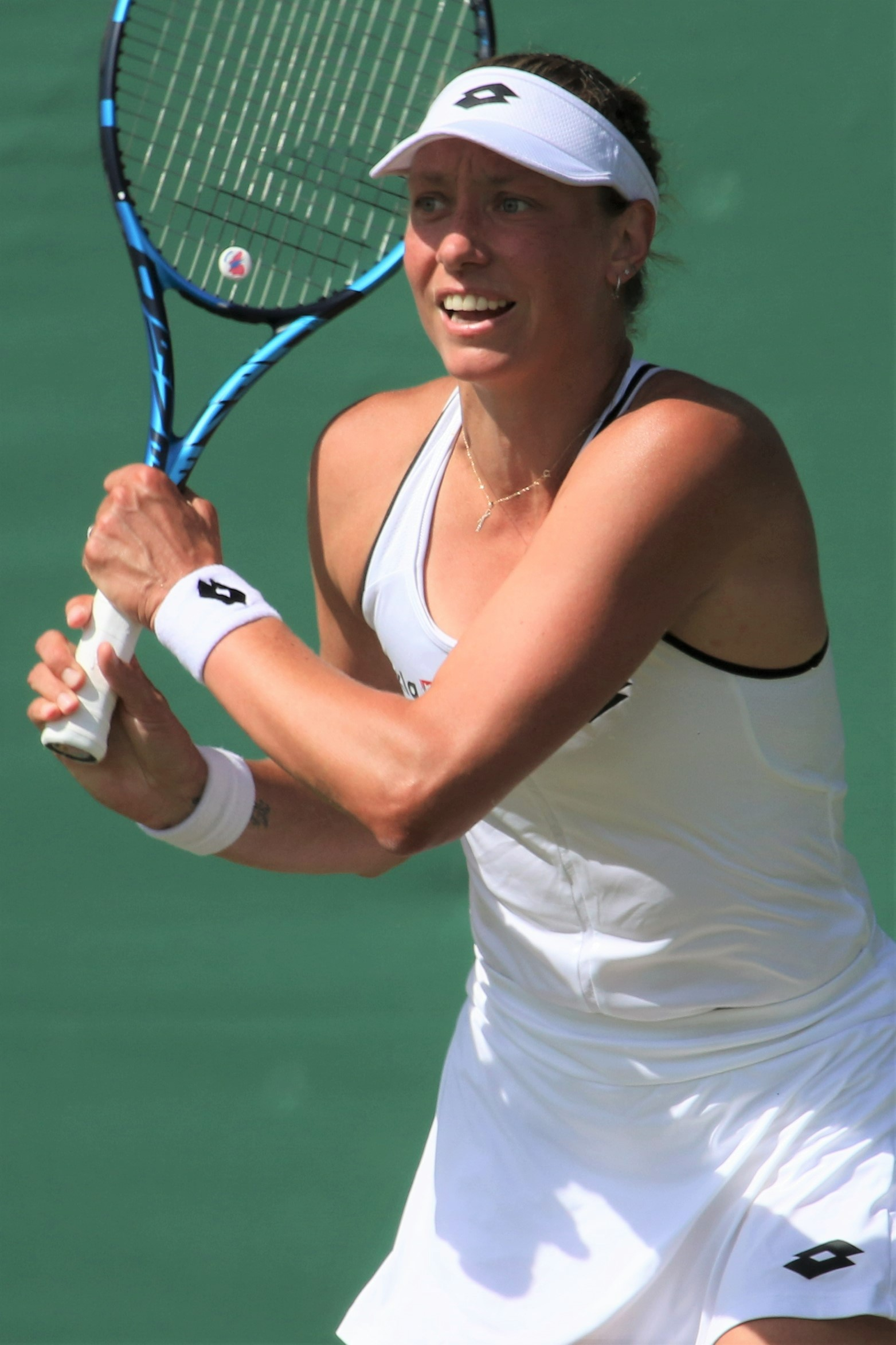
- Wickmayer at the 2022 Wimbledon Championships
- Country (sports): Belgium
- Residence: Hasselt, Belgium
- Born: 20 October 1989 (age 37) Lier, Belgium
- Height: 1.82 m (6 ft 0 in)
- Turned pro: 2004
- Retired: 2 July 2025
- Plays: Right-handed (two-handed backhand)
- Coach: Germain Gigounon
- Prize money: $6,211,775

Singles
- Career record: 535–372
- Career titles: 5
- Highest ranking: No. 12 (19 April 2010)

Grand Slam singles results
- Australian Open: 4R (2010, 2015)
- French Open: 3R (2010, 2011, 2016)
- Wimbledon: 4R (2011)
- US Open: SF (2009)

Other tournaments
- Olympic Games: 2R (2012)

Doubles
- Career record: 198–137
- Career titles: 4
- Highest ranking: No. 61 (11 September 2023)

Grand Slam doubles results
- Australian Open: 2R (2010)
- French Open: QF (2025)
- Wimbledon: 2R (2009, 2013)
- US Open: 2R (2023)

Team competitions
- Fed Cup: 28–14

Yanina Wickmayer (born 20 October 1989) is a Belgian former professional tennis player. She reached the semifinals at the 2009 US Open, and a career-high ranking of world No. 12, on 19 April 2010. In doubles, she achieved a career-high of world No. 61, on 11 September 2023. She was awarded "Most Improved Player" by the WTA in 2009. Time magazine named her one of the "30 Legends of Women's Tennis: Past, Present and Future" in June 2011.

== Personal life ==
Wickmayer was born on 20 October 1989, to Marc Wickmayer and Daniella Dannevoye. She was introduced to tennis at the age of nine by friends at local courts. Her mother died at an early age shortly thereafter. She is named after Diego Maradona's youngest daughter Gianinna. The surname 'Wickmayer' traces back to Austria through her father Marc. Wickmayer, who fluently speaks Dutch, English, and French, most admires former Belgian tennis player Kim Clijsters. In 2017, she announced that Clijsters would be working with her during the 2017 Wimbledon Championships. On 16 July 2017, Wickmayer married long-time boyfriend and former professional football player Jérôme van der Zijl. In April 2021, she gave birth to a daughter.

== Career ==
=== 2006-07: First ITF titles ===
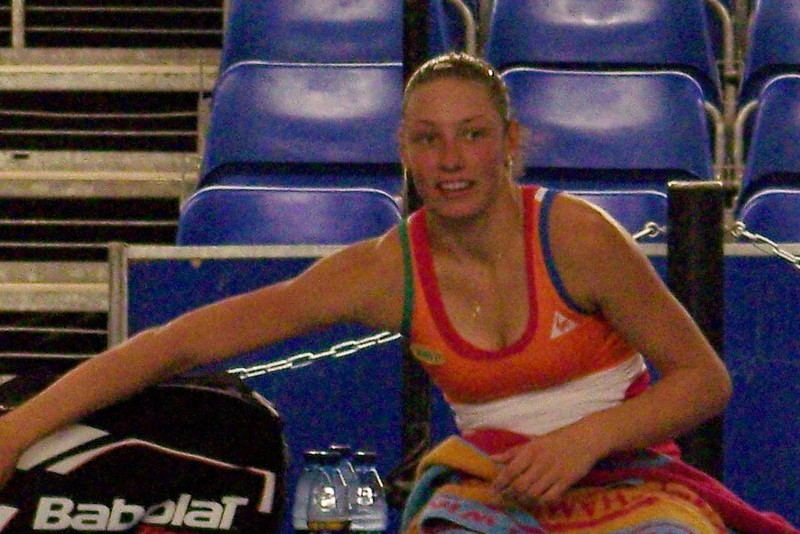
Yanina Wickmayer in 2007

In 2006, Wickmayer recorded her first wins: three singles titles and two doubles titles on the ITF Women's Circuit.

In 2007, she continued her success on the ITF Circuit by winning several tournaments in Asia during the fall season (see external links). It was around this time that Wickmayer surpassed Caroline Maes as the No. 2 female Belgian player. At the start of the year, she was No. 534 in the world, but by November 2007, was around No. 170. Wickmayer had won eight singles and seven doubles titles on the circuit. She was also selected by team captain Sabine Appelmans to represent the Belgium in Fed Cup. She lost to Venus Williams, 1–6, 2–6, in her World Group match, before winning one rubber and losing the other against Chinese opposition.

=== 2008: First WTA Tour final ===
In the 2008 Fed Cup tie versus Ukraine, Wickmayer sprang a surprise victory over reigning Australian Open women's doubles champion Kateryna Bondarenko. Wickmayer qualified in singles for the French Open, but lost in the first round to Akgul Amanmuradova. She reached the final of the Birmingham Classic, but lost to Kateryna Bondarenko in a close three-setter.

At Wimbledon, Wickmayer lost in the first round to Ai Sugiyama, in straight sets.

=== 2009: US Open semifinal ===
She started the new year with first-round losses in both Brisbane and the Australian Open. She won her first WTA Tour match of the year at Indian Wells, defeating Magdaléna Rybáriková in straight sets, before she lost to Daniela Hantuchová in the second round, despite holding two match points. She then lost her first-round matches in Miami and Charleston.

Wickmayer won her first WTA Tour singles title in Estoril. She beat third seed Sorana Cîrstea in three sets en route to the final, where she defeated Ekaterina Makarova. At the French Open, she was beaten by Samantha Stosur in the second round.

Wickmayer lost to a newly returned Maria Sharapova in the quarterfinals at the Birmingham Classic. At the Rosmalen Open, Wickmayer reached both the singles final and the doubles final, losing to Tamarine Tanasugarn in the singles final. The doubles final was a close contest, in which she lost in three sets to an Italian pairing. At Wimbledon, she lost in the first round to Elena Vesnina.

During the summer hardcourt season, Wickmayer reached the third round in Los Angeles, losing to Vera Zvonareva. She was defeated in the early rounds of her three other summer tournaments. At the US Open, she reached semifinals, losing to Caroline Wozniacki, in straight sets.

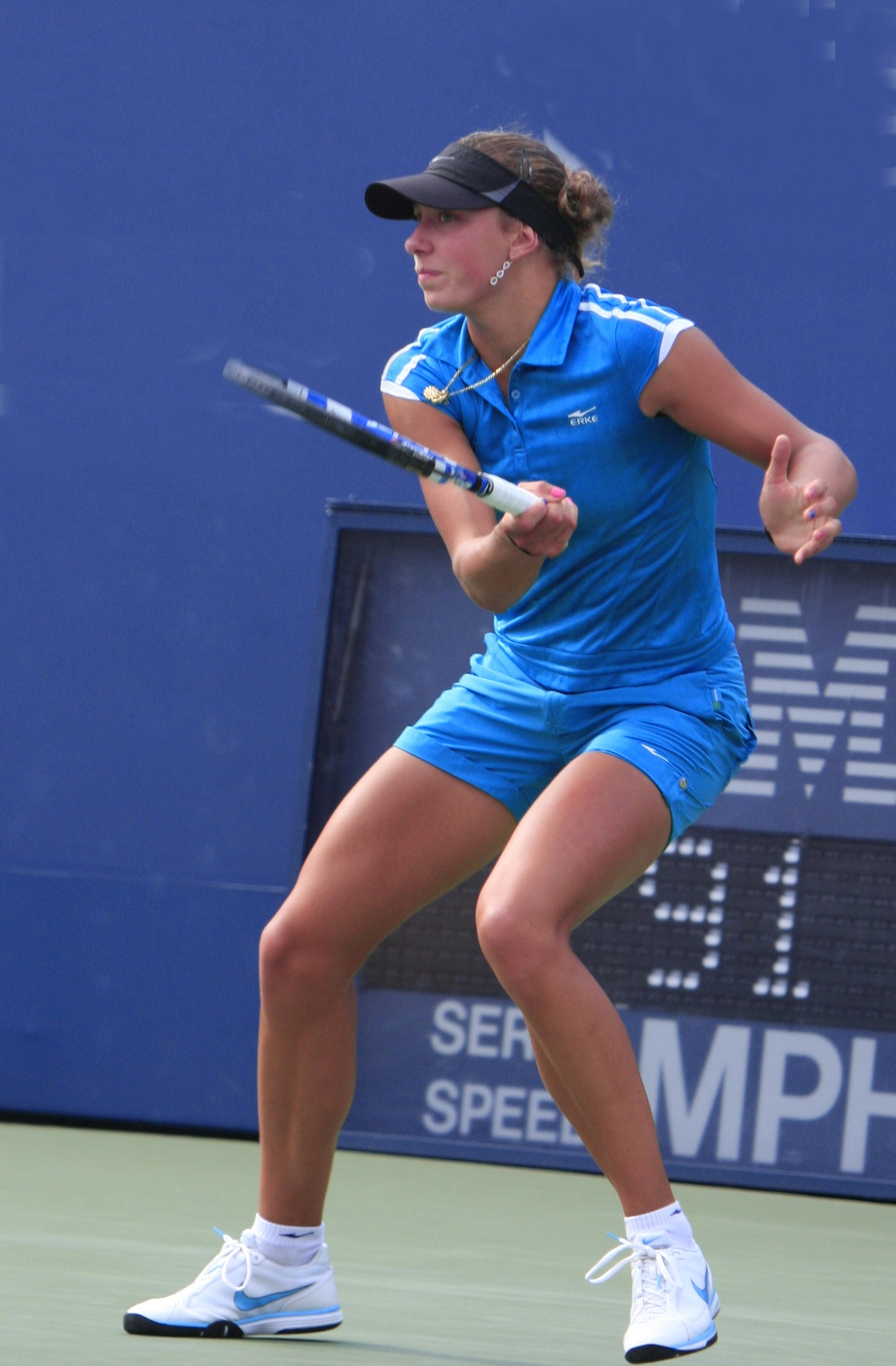
Yanina Wickmayer at the 2009 US Open

Wickmayer fell in the first round in Beijing to Alisa Kleybanova but qualified for the Tournament of Champions. Her next tournament was in Linz. She won through to the semifinals, where she upset top seed Flavia Pennetta for her biggest career win. She beat Petra Kvitová in the final, and as a result made it into the top 20 for the first time. One week later at the Luxembourg Open, she reached the semifinals where she was edged by Timea Bacsinszky, in three sets.

At her last tournament of the year in Bali, she was drawn into Group C. Wickmayer defeated Kimiko Date-Krumm in her first match in straight sets. As she was supposed to face Anabel Medina Garrigues next, she was disqualified from the tournament due to doping allegations.

On 1 October 2009, it was announced that Wickmayer and fellow Belgian tennis professional Xavier Malisse were to defend themselves before the Flemish anti-doping tribunal for failing to properly fill out their whereabouts. Wickmayer replied in a press release that the failure to follow procedure was due to her not being able to log on to the relevant website, not being able to contact the right people when needed, and not being in the country when written admonitions arrived by mail from the Flemish anti-doping authorities. At the tribunal on 22 October 2009, the prosecution did not ask for a ban, but rather for a "principal restraint" of the facts that they were being accused of, and as such it was expected that this would not cause any problems for either athlete. However, on 5 November 2009, the decision of the tribunal was announced: an effective one-year ban for both players. Wickmayer, as well as Malisse, appealed this decision (in Brussels), which was initially overturned on 16 December 2009, after the appeal was granted.

=== 2010: Top 15 ranking ===
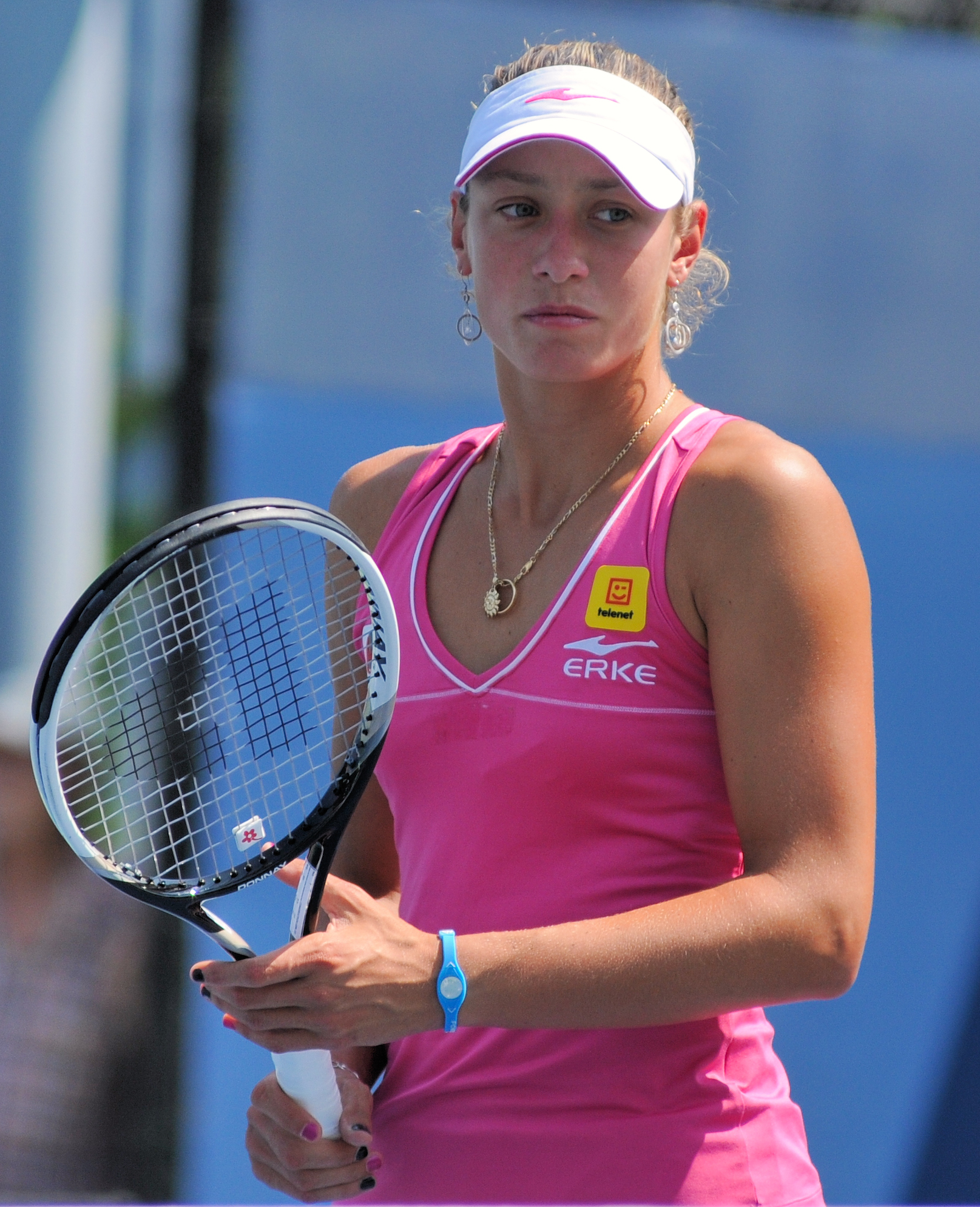
Wickmayer at the 2010 US Open

Wickmayer accepted a wildcard into the first tournament of the year, the Auckland Open. Seeded third, she reached the final defeating Julia Görges, Raluca Olaru, wildcard Kimiko Date-Krumm, and Shahar Pe'er. In the final, Wickmayer easily defeated top seed Flavia Pennetta. Wickmayer won the tournament without dropping a set. This title was her first title of the year and third of her career. Due to Wickmayer's suspensions being lifted after the deadline for the Australian Open, she was forced to enter the qualifying draw. After a nervous first-round qualifying, she easily won through to the main draw. Being a dangerous floater, she drew Alexandra Dulgheru in the first round. In a match that included numerous rain delays, she prevailed in the third set tiebreaker. In the second round, she defeated 12th seed Flavia Pennetta. In the third round, she beat Sara Errani in three sets. In the fourth round, Wickmayer lost in three sets to compatriot and former world No. 1, Justine Henin. Despite the loss she moved up to a career-high of No. 15.

Wickmayer was selected to represent Belgium at the World Group II Fed Cup tie against Poland. She won both her rubbers against Marta Domachowska and Agnieszka Radwańska, thus allowing Kirsten Flipkens to secure the tie for Belgium with a win against Domachowska, to advance to the World Group playoff. In her next two tournaments, the Open GdF Suez tournament in Paris and the Tennis Championships in Dubai, Wickmayer lost in first-round matches, in Paris to Petra Martić; and in Dubai to Shahar Pe'er. She fared better at the Indian Wells Open, when she won two matches, before losing in the round of 16 to María José Martínez Sánchez. She then traveled to Key Biscayne for the Miami Open. Seeded 12th, Wickmayer reached the quarterfinals after wins over qualifier Elena Baltacha, wildcard Petra Martić, and Timea Bacsinszky. She was defeated in the quarterfinals by 13th seed Marion Bartoli. Despite her loss to Bartoli, her strong performance brought her to a new career-high ranking of world No. 13, moving to 12 without playing the next week.

Wickmayer was again selected to represent Belgium at the Fed Cup World Group playoff tie against Estonia. When Clijsters and Wickmayer won their singles rubbers on Saturday, Belgium was in a comfortable lead. However, Clijsters had injured her foot and had to be replaced by Justine Henin, who herself had been injured earlier that week. Henin lost her rubber, so it fell on Wickmayer to bring home the tie during the fourth, which she did. At the Porsche Tennis Grand Prix held in Stuttgart, Wickmayer moved to the second round, before falling for the second consecutive time to fellow Belgian Justine Henin, 3–6, 5–7. Her next tournament was the Italian Open in Rome, where she was the 11th seed. She defeated Karolina Šprem and Aravane Rezaï in the first two rounds, before losing to seventh seed and eventual finalist Jelena Janković in the third round, 2–6, 0–6. Wickmayer pulled out of the Madrid Open citing a right elbow injury, and underwent surgery. Though the French Open was only two weeks later, she managed to be fit in time and played there as 16th seed. She defeated Sandra Záhlavová in the first round 6–1, 6–1. In the second round, she beat Sybille Bammer in three sets. Wickmayer fell in the third round to 23rd seed Daniela Hantuchová. Despite her recent injury, this was her best French Open performance to date.

Wickmayer started her grass-court season at the Birmingham Classic. As the third seed, she reached the quarterfinals defeating qualifier Laura Robson and 14th seed Tamarine Tanasugarn. She was stunned in the quarterfinals by qualifier Alison Riske in three sets. The next week, she had 200 ranking points to defend from her reaching the Rosmalen Open final last year. However, Wickmayer decided to play at the Eastbourne International. She was not seeded due to the strong players field. In the first round, Wickmayer lost easily to fifth seed Clijsters, 1–6, 1–6. Wickmayer finished off her grass-court season by competing at the Wimbledon Championships. Seeded 15th in the main draw, Wickmayer beat wild card Alison Riske in the first round. This win marked her first main-draw win at Wimbledon. In the second round, she beat her doubles partner Kirsten Flipkens. In the third round, Wickmayer was defeated by 21st seed and eventual finalist Vera Zvonareva, 6–4, 6–2. The day before their second round match, Flipkens and Wickmayer played doubles together, which they lost in the first round to 13th seed Vera Dushevina/Ekaterina Makarova. Wickmayer also played mixed doubles with her compatriot Dick Norman. They lost in the first round to British wildcards Jonathan Marray/Anna Smith. After Wimbledon, she rose to world No. 16 once again, the third Belgian after Kim Clijsters and Justine Henin.

After Wimbledon, Wickmayer moved on to the US Open Series by playing at the Stanford Classic. As the seventh seed, Wickmayer made it to the quarterfinals beating Chan Yung-jan and Dominika Cibulková. In the quarterfinals, she lost in a close match to top seed Sam Stosur. Wickmayer was seeded eighth at the San Diego Open, but fell in the first round to Svetlana Kuznetsova. Seeded 12th at the Cincinnati Open, Wickmayer reached the quarterfinals defeating qualifier Gréta Arn, Gisela Dulko, and eighth seed Li Na. In the quarterfinals, she was defeated by Anastasia Pavlyuchenkova. Seeded 13th at the Rogers Cup, Wickmayer lost in the second round to Ágnes Szávay. Seeded fifth at New Haven, Wickmayer was defeated in the first round by Timea Bacsinszky, 6–3, 6–1. Wickmayer was seeded 15th at the US Open, with semifinal ranking points to defend. Beating Alla Kudryavtseva, Julia Görges, and Patty Schnyder, she reached the fourth round where she lost to 31st seed Kaia Kanepi. As a result, Wickmayer failed to defend her semifinalist points from last year.

Turning to the Asian events, Wickmayer competed at the Pan Pacific Open. She lost in the first round to 11th seed Marion Bartoli.

=== 2011: Continued success ===
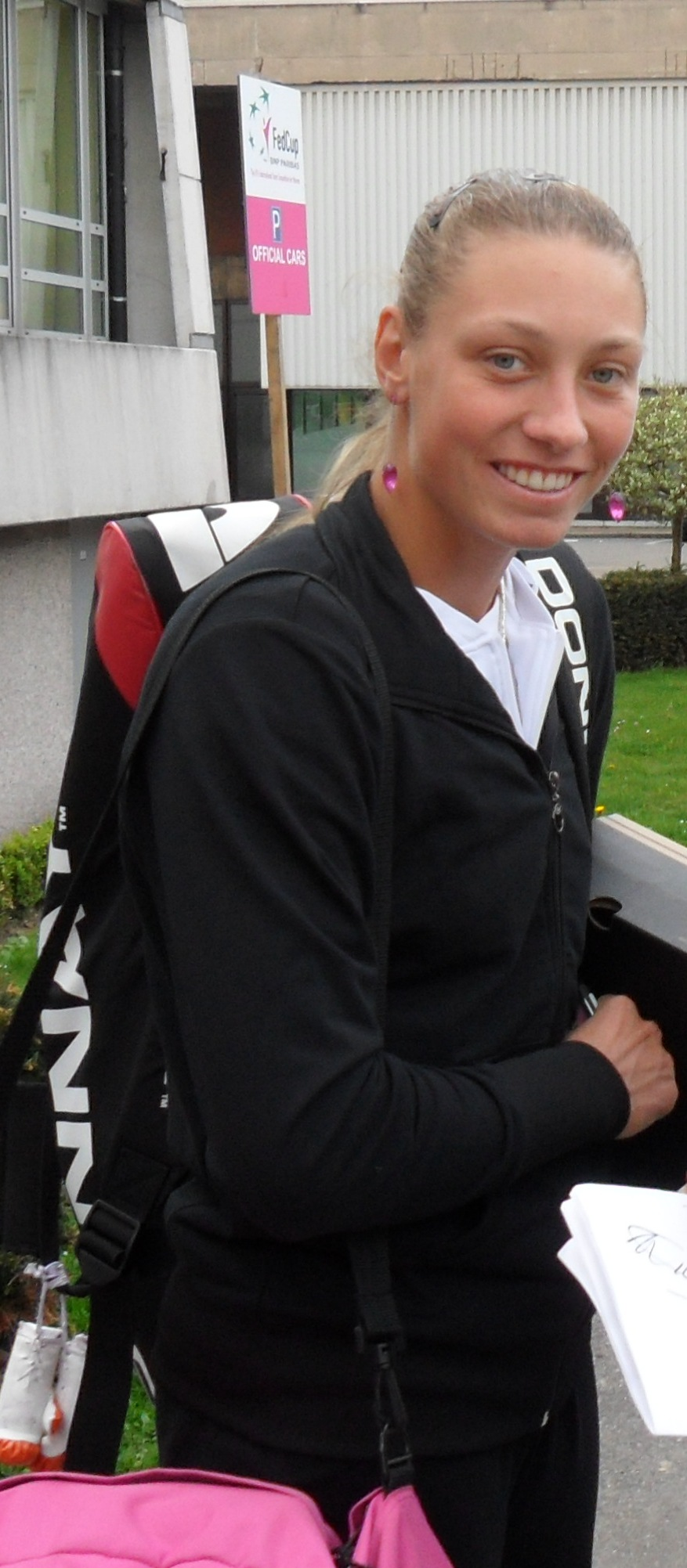
Wickmayer during the 2011 Fed Cup semifinals

Wickmayer returned to Auckland to defend her 2010 championship. Seeded second, she reached the final once again defeating Dinara Safina, qualifier Sabine Lisicki, Simona Halep, and Peng Shuai. In the final, Wickmayer lost to Gréta Arn. At the Sydney International, Wickmayer was defeated in the first round by fourth seed Samantha Stosur. Seeded 21st at the Australian Open, Wickmayer lost in the second round to Latvian Anastasija Sevastova, 4–6, 2–6.

After the Australian Open, Wickmayer played in the Fed Cup tie versus the United States. Wickmayer won both of her rubbers beating Bethanie Mattek-Sands, and Melanie Oudin. Belgium beat the United States 4–1. Next, Belgium will face the Czech Republic in the semifinals. Seeded seventh at the Open GdF Suez, Wickmayer made it to the quarterfinals by beating Elena Vesnina and Klára Zakopalová. Her quarterfinal match she lost to fourth seed and eventual champion Petra Kvitová, 7–5, 3–6, 6–7. Wickmayer had a 5–3 lead in the third set, but Kvitová rallied to get the win. At the Dubai Tennis Championships, Wickmayer beat wildcard Bojana Jovanovski in the first round, in three sets. In the second round, she stunned fifth seed Li Na. In the match, Li Na wasted four match points; she led 6–2 in the second-set tiebreaker before Wickmayer reeled off the next six points to level the match and ultimately, win the match. In the third round, Wickmayer lost to ninth seed Shahar Pe'er. Wickmayer's next event was the Indian Wells Open. As the 23rd seed, she reached semifinals after beating Melanie Oudin, 14th seed Kaia Kanepi, 25th seed Dominika Cibulková, and tenth seed Shahar Pe'er. In the semifinal, she lost to 15th seed Marion Bartoli, 1–6, 3–6. This was her first semifinal ever in Indian Wells. At the Miami Open, Wickmayer was the 23rd seed. After a first-round bye, she was defeated in the second round by Elena Vesnina.

Wickmayer began her clay-court season at the Family Circle Cup. As the sixth seed, she reached the quarterfinals beating Zheng Jie and qualifier Anna Tatishvili. In the quarterfinals, she was defeated by top seed and eventual champion Caroline Wozniacki, 4–6, 6–4, 6–4. After playing in Charleston, Wickmayer returned home to play in the Fed Cup semifinal tie versus the Czech Republic. Wickmayer won her first rubber over Barbora Záhlavová-Strýcová. In her final rubber, she lost to Petra Kvitová. In the end, the Czech moved on to the Fed Cup final after beating Belgium 3–2. At the Madrid Open, Wickmayer lost in the first round to world No. 39, Ekaterina Makarova. Ranked 24 at the Italian Open, she reached the third round after wins over Angelique Kerber and 13th seed Ana Ivanovic. In the third round, she was defeated by top seed Caroline Wozniacki, 6–1, 7–6. Wickmayer played her final tournament before the French Open at the Brussels Open. As the sixth seed, she reached the quarterfinals defeating qualifier Kaia Kanepi and qualifier Alison Van Uytvanck. In the quarterfinals, she was up against top seed Caroline Wozniacki. Wozniacki led 2–0 in the first set when Wickmayer retired due to a back injury. As the 21st seed at the French Open, Wickmayer had a good run to the third round beating Monica Niculescu, 6–0, 6–3, and Ayumi Morita, 6–4, 7–5. In the third round, she lost to 12th seed Agnieszka Radwańska, 4–6, 4–6.

Wickmayer played only one grass-court tournament in preparation for Wimbledon. Seeded third at the Rosmalen Open, she made it to the quarterfinals where she lost to seventh seed and eventual champion, Roberta Vinci. At Wimbledon, Wickmayer was the 19th seed. She made it to the fourth round beating Varvara Lepchenko, Anna Tatishvili, and 12th seed Svetlana Kuznetsova. In the fourth round, Wickmayer was defeated by eighth seed and eventual champion Petra Kvitová, 6–0, 6–2.

During the summer, Wickmayer took part in the Rogers Cup, where she lost in the first round again to Roberta Vinci. She then played Cincinnati Open as the 17th seed. Wickmayer lost in the second round to qualifier Petra Martić. Seeded fourth at the Texas Tennis Open, she retired in the first round against Sofia Arvidsson with a back injury. Seeded 20th at the US Open, she won her first match against Sorana Cîrstea. Wickmayer then withdrew in the second round against Alla Kudryavtseva due to the same back injury. She then sat out the fall Asian tour.

Wickmayer ended the year ranked 26.

=== 2012: Steady ranking ===
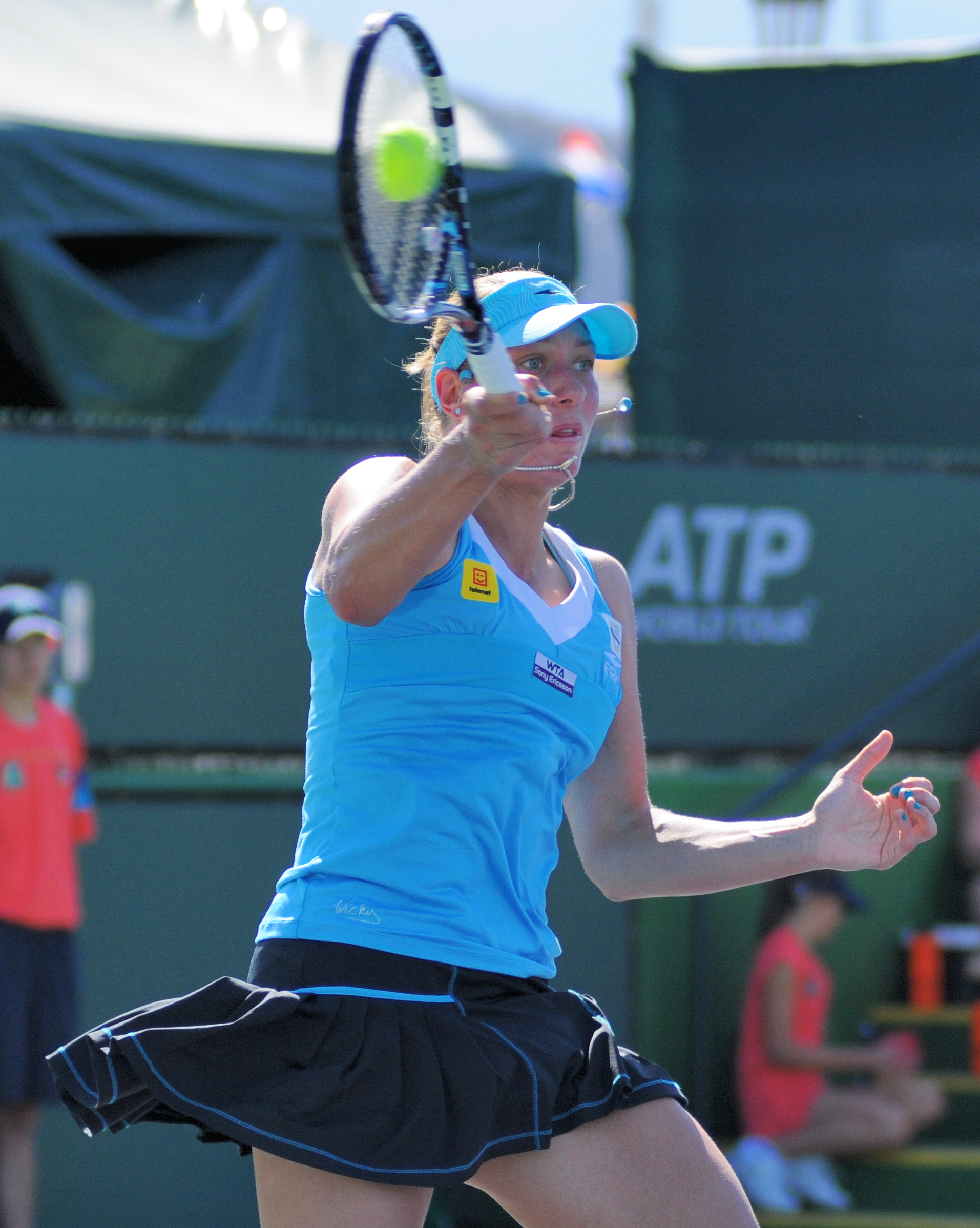
Wickmayer hitting a forehand at the 2012 Indian Wells Open

Wickmayer began her 2012 season by competing at the Auckland Open. Seeded seventh, she lost in the second round to Sara Errani. As the top seed at the Hobart International, Wickmayer reached the final beating Marina Erakovic, Australian wildcard Casey Dellacqua, Simona Halep, and sixth seed Shahar Pe'er. In the final, she was defeated by qualifier Mona Barthel. Seeded 28th at the Australian Open, the first major of the season, Wickmayer lost in the first round to Galina Voskoboeva.

Representing Belgium in the Fed Cup tie versus Serbia, Wickmayer won both of her rubbers over Bojana Jovanovski and Aleksandra Krunić. Despite both of her victories, Serbia beat Belgium 3–2. Her next tournament was at the Paris indoor event. In the first round, she faced lucky loser Jill Craybas. Wickmayer won the first set 6–1, after which the American withdrew with a back injury, and was forced to retire. In the second round, she faced another American, Christina McHale, and she won 6–2, 7–5. In the quarterfinals, Wickmayer got past Mona Barthel to reach the semifinals. In the semifinals, she lost to ninth seed and eventual champion Angelique Kerber in three sets. Wickmayer then went on to play in Doha at the Qatar Open where she reached the quarterfinals defeating Ayumi Morita, seventh seed Francesca Schiavone, and Ksenia Pervak. She then lost in the quarterfinals to world No. 1 and eventual champion, Victoria Azarenka, in straight sets. She then went to Indian Wells with a lot of points to defend, after reaching semifinals the year before. As the 22nd seed, she lost in the second round to Jarmila Gajdošová in three sets. She plummeted from No. 24 to No. 33 the week after. At Miami, she reached the round of 16 after defeating Marina Erakovic in the second round and Kim Clijsters in the third round. Wickmayer lost in the fourth round to fourth seed Caroline Wozniacki.

Wickmayer began her clay-court season at the Family Circle Cup. As the 12th seed, she was defeated in the second round by qualifier Yaroslava Shvedova. As the fourth seed at the Rabat Grand Prix, Wickmayer lost in the first round to Patricia Mayr-Achleitner. At the Madrid Open, Wickmayer fell in the second round to Roberta Vinci 1–6, 2–6. Competing at the Italian Open, Wickmayer was defeated in the first round by Iveta Benešová in a narrow three-setter. In her final tournament before the French Open, the Brussels Open, she lost in the second round to fourth seed Dominika Cibulková. At the French Open, Wickmayer was defeated in the first round by Tsvetana Pironkova.

After the French Open, Wickmayer played at the Gastein Ladies, a clay-court event. As the second seed, she reached the final beating Mariana Duque-Mariño, Patricia Mayr-Achleitner, Yvonne Meusburger, and Mandy Minella. In the final, Wickmayer lost to seventh seed Alizé Cornet. This was her second WTA final of 2012.

Wickmayer played only one grass-court tournament before Wimbledon. At the Rosmalen Open, Wickmayer lost in the first round to qualifier Daria Gavrilova, 1–6, 2–6. At the Wimbledon Championships, Wickmayer defeated 32nd seed Svetlana Kuznetsova in the first round, in straight sets. In the second round, she won a tight match against Galina Voskoboeva. In the third round, she lost to Tamira Paszek, in three sets.

Wickmayer started her US Open Series at the Stanford Classic. Seeded fifth, she won her first-round match over Chang Kai-chen. Wickmayer then beat Heather Watson in her second-round match, and in the quarterfinals upset second seed and last year finalist Marion Bartoli. In the semifinals, Wickmayer lost to American lucky loser and eventual finalist, CoCo Vandeweghe. Seeded seventh at the San Diego Open, Wickmayer faced qualifier Chan Yung-jan in the first round. Chan won the first set 7–6. The match did not continue any further because Wickmayer retired due to a lower back injury. Representing Belgium at the 2012 Summer Olympics, Wickmayer defeated Anabel Medina Garrigues in the first round. In the second, she lost to eighth seed Caroline Wozniacki. At the Rogers Cup, Wickmayer lost in the first round to Roberta Vinci. Wickmayer had a 5–2 lead in the third set before Vinci made a comeback to win the match. At the Western & Southern Open, Wickmayer was defeated in the first round by Sorana Cîrstea, in three sets. As the fourth seed at the Texas Tennis Open, she made it to the second round where she lost to qualifier Casey Dellacqua, 4–6, 3–6. Seeded 25th at the US Open, she beat qualifier Julia Glushko in the first round. In the second round, Wickmayer was defeated by world No. 90, Pauline Parmentier.

Competing at the Challenge Bell as the second seed, Wickmayer reached the second round losing to qualifier Lauren Davis, 1–6, 1–6. Playing at the Pan Pacific Open in Tokyo, she was defeated in the first round by world No. 24, Jelena Janković. Her final tournament of the year was at the China Open. In the first round, she lost to Peng Shuai.

Wickmayer ended the year ranked 23.

=== 2013: Struggles with form ===
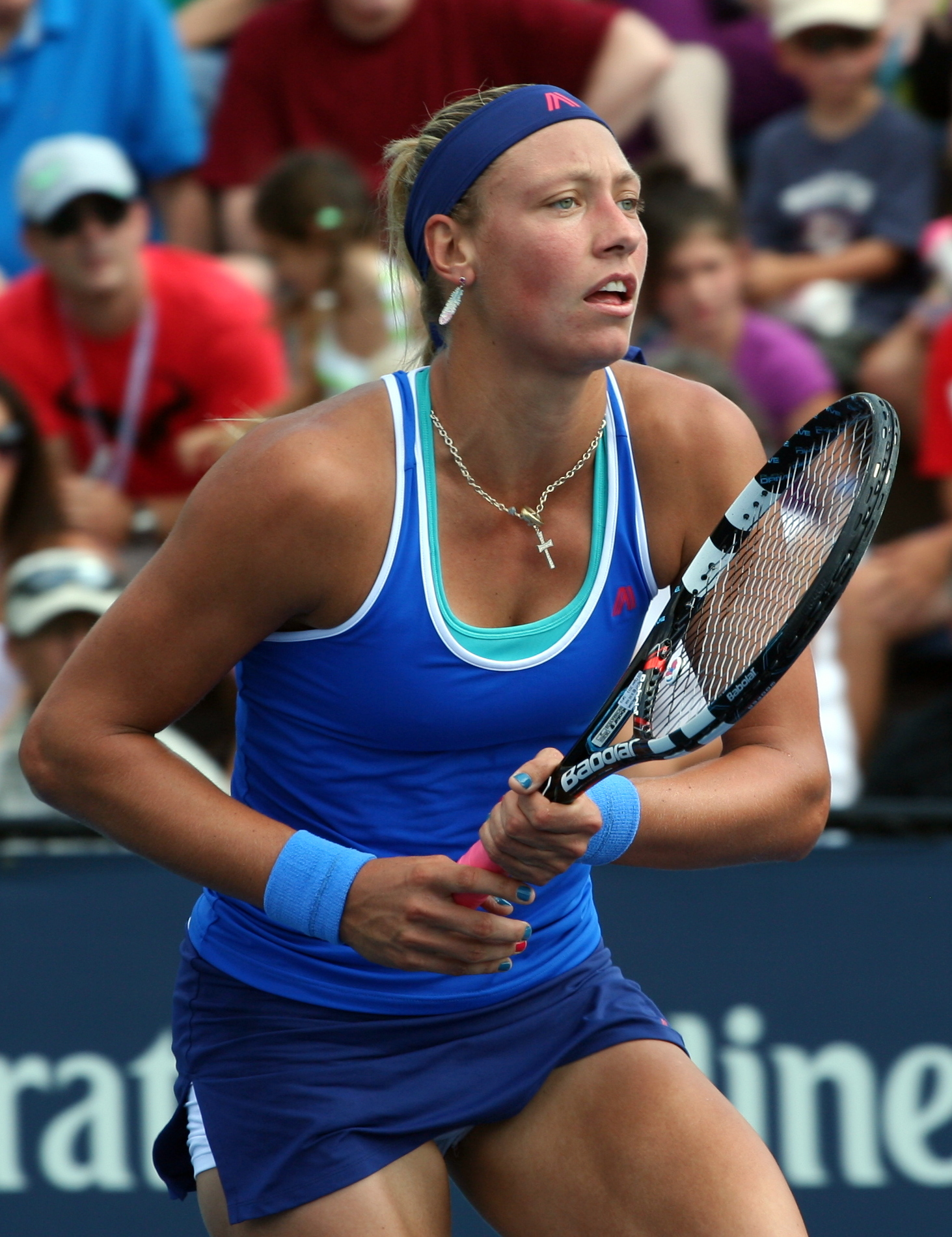
Wickmayer at the 2013 US Open

Wickmayer played her first tournament of the season at Auckland where she was seeded third and, reached the final but lost to top seed Agnieszka Radwańska. In Sydney, she was defeated in the first round by qualifier Galina Voskoboeva. Seeded 20th at the Australian Open, she made it to the third round where she lost to 14th seed Maria Kirilenko.

Competing at the Open GdF Suez, Wickmayer was defeated in the second round by French wildcard Kristina Mladenovic. Playing in the Fed Cup tie versus Switzerland, she beat Stefanie Vögele in her first rubber. In her final rubber, she lost to Romina Oprandi. Switzerland won the Fed Cup tie over Belgium 4–1. At the Qatar Ladies Open, she retired due to a low back injury during her first-round match versus 15th seed Roberta Vinci. Seeded 30th at Indian Wells, she reached the third round where she was defeated by fourth seed Angelique Kerber. Seeded 31st at the Miami Open, she lost in the second round to Ayumi Morita. Seeded sixth at the Monterrey Open, she was defeated in the second round by Monica Niculescu.

Wickmayer began her clay-court season at the Porsche Tennis Grand Prix. She lost in the first round to qualifier Bethanie Mattek-Sands. Competing in Portugal, she was defeated in the second round by fourth seed and eventual finalist, Carla Suárez Navarro. At the Madrid Open, she lost in the first round to eighth seed Petra Kvitová. In Rome, she was defeated in the second round by lucky loser Lourdes Domínguez Lino. Playing in her final tournament before the French Open at the Brussels Open, she lost in the first round to Jamie Hampton. At the French Open, she was defeated in the first round by qualifier Anna Karolína Schmiedlová.

Wickmayer began her grass-court campaign at the Birmingham Classic. As the ninth seed, she lost in the second round to Mirjana Lučić-Baroni. Wickmayer played her final tournament before Wimbledon at the Eastbourne International. She upset fourth seed Petra Kvitová in the second round and sixth seed Maria Kirilenko in the quarterfinals. She lost in her semifinal match to Elena Vesnina. At Wimbledon, she was defeated in the first round by Vesna Dolonc.

Wickmayer started her US Open Series at the Stanford Classic where she lost in the first round to Daniela Hantuchová. In Washington D.C., she was defeated in the first round by fourth seed Alizé Cornet. Playing at the Rogers Cup, she lost in the second round to third seed Agnieszka Radwańska. At the Cincinnati Open, she lost in the first round to lucky loser Monica Niculescu. Playing her final tournament before the US Open at the New Haven Open, she was defeated in the final round of qualifying by Alison Riske. At the US Open, she lost in the first round to 14th seed Maria Kirilenko.

In October, Wickmayer competed at the Linz Open where she lost in the first round to third seed and eventual finalist, Ana Ivanovic. At the Luxembourg Open, she was defeated in the second round by qualifier Katarzyna Piter. However, in doubles, she and Stephanie Vogt won the title beating Kristina Barrois/Laura Thorpe in the final. This was Wickmayer's first WTA doubles title. Wickmayer had great results at the last two tournaments she played in 2013. Seeded second at the Nanjing Open, she reached the semifinals defeating Yaroslava Shvedova, wildcard Wang Yafan, and Anna-Lena Friedsam. She ended losing her semifinal match to third seed Zhang Shuai. Wickmayer's final tournament of the year was the Taipei Open. As the second seed, she reached the final after beating qualifier Chan Chin-wei, Olga Govortsova, Zheng Saisai, and Luksika Kumkhum. In the final, Wickmayer was defeated by compatriot Alison Van Uytvanck. Nevertheless, this was Wickmayer's best result of the year.

Wickmayer ended the year ranked 59.

=== 2014: Diagnosed with Lyme disease ===
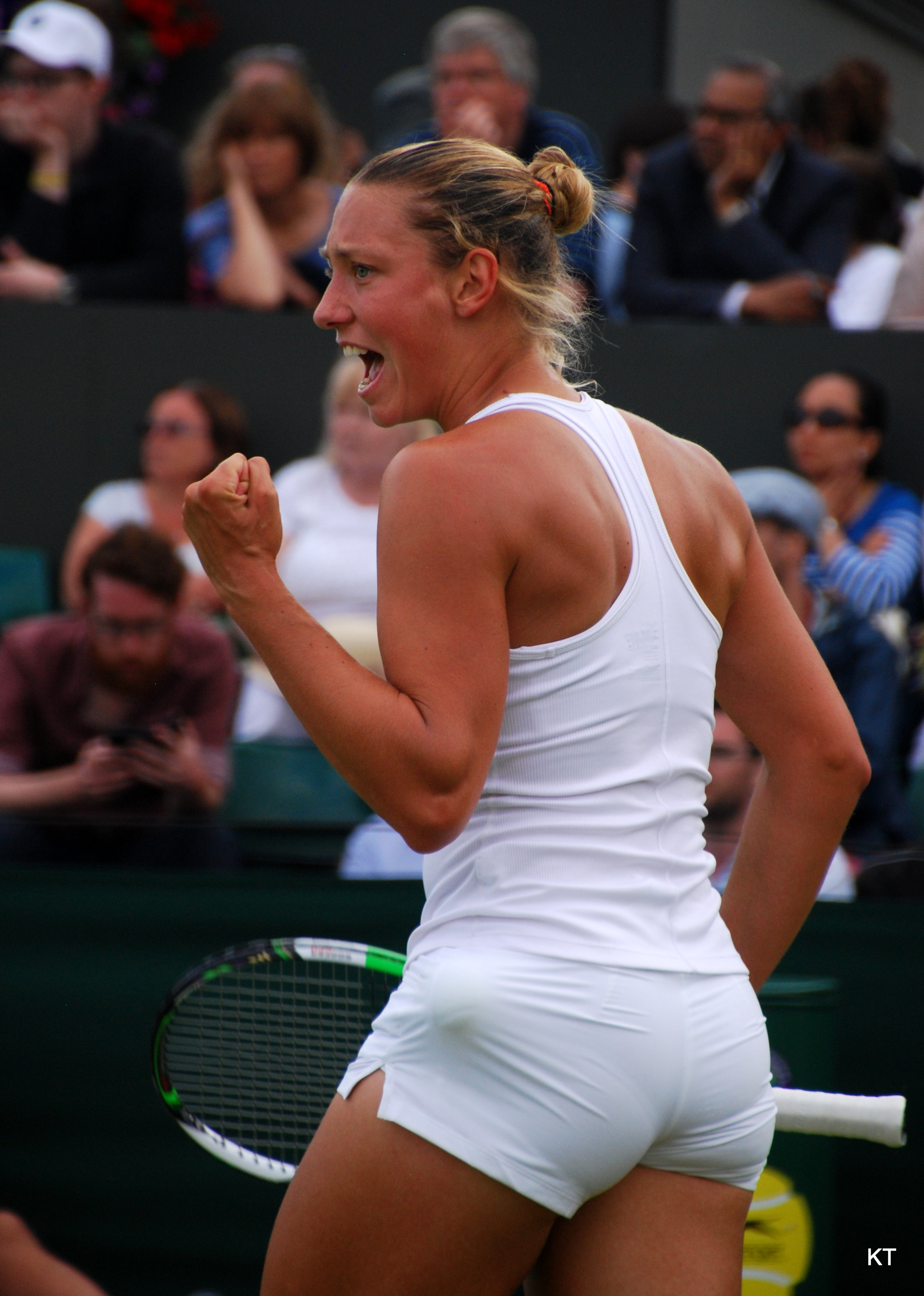
Wickmayer during day 3 of the 2014 Wimbledon Championships

Wickmayer began the 2014 season at the Auckland Open. Although she had reached the previous year's final, she lost in the first round to qualifier Kristýna Plíšková. Next, she played at the Hobart International. In the first round, she faced Laura Robson, who retired due to a left wrist injury. In the second round, she played qualifier Garbiñe Muguruza. Muguruza was leading 4–1 in the first set when Wickmayer retired due to illness. Ranked 63 at the Australian Open, Wickmayer beat Dinah Pfizenmaier in the first round. In the second round, she lost to Alison Riske.

At the Qatar Ladies Open, Wickmayer reached the quarterfinals, beating Andrea Petkovic, eighth seed Caroline Wozniacki, and Jana Čepelová. She lost in her quarterfinal match to second seed Agnieszka Radwańska. Competing at the Abierto Mexicano, Wickmayer was defeated in the second round by top seed and eventual champion Dominika Cibulková. At the Indian Wells Open, Wickmayer lost in the second round to 26th seed Lucie Šafářová. Playing at the Sony Open, Wickmayer was defeated in the first round by Varvara Lepchenko. In Poland at the Katowice Open, Wickmayer lost in the first round to Alexandra Cadanţu.

Starting her clay-court season at the Portugal Open, Wickmayer was defeated in the second round by fourth seed Roberta Vinci. Seeded No. 1 at the Open de Cagnes-sur-Mer, she was stunned in the first round by qualifier Richèl Hogenkamp. Seeded fourth at the Sparta Prague Open, Wickmayer was defeated in the first round by qualifier Madison Brengle. Ranked 64 at the French Open, Wickmayer upset 13th seed Caroline Wozniacki in the first round. In the second round, she lost to Sílvia Soler Espinosa.

Wickmayer began grass-court season at the Birmingham Classic and upset tenth seed Bojana Jovanovski in the first round. In the second round, she lost to CoCo Vandeweghe. In the Netherlands at the Rosmalen Open, Wickmayer was defeated in the first round by fifth seed Andrea Petkovic. Ranked 69 at Wimbledons, Wickmayer upset 17th seed Sam Stosur, before she lost to qualifier Ana Konjuh in round two.

Wickmayer started her preparation for the US Open at the Stanford Classic. In the first round, she faced qualifier Carol Zhao. Zhao won the first set 6–4; she was leading 1–0 in the second set when Wickmayer retired due to viral illness. Wickmayer qualified for the main draw at the Rogers Cup beating Verónica Cepede Royg and Kristina Mladenovic. In the first round, she was defeated by lucky loser Karolína Plíšková. Wickmayer qualified for the San Diego Open defeating Alison Van Uytvanck and Julia Görges. In the first round, she lost to fourteenth seed Sara Errani. At the Connecticut Open, she lost in the second round of qualifying to Timea Bacsinszky. Ranked 64 at the US Open, Wickmayer was defeated in the first round by Belinda Bencic.

Wickmayer competed at the first edition of the Hong Kong Open. As the sixth seed, she defeated qualifier Elizaveta Kulichkova in the first round. In the second round, Wickmayer lost to Zheng Saisai. In the Korea Open, Wickmayer was defeated in the second round by fourth seed Magdaléna Rybáriková.

Late into the season, Wickmayer was diagnosed with lyme disease, having been experiencing symptoms for around five months. She had previously thought that she had an allergic infection. Plans to participate in more tournaments in Asia were cancelled. She ended the season recuperating and taking medication.

Wickmayer ended the year ranked 67.

=== 2015: Fourth career title ===
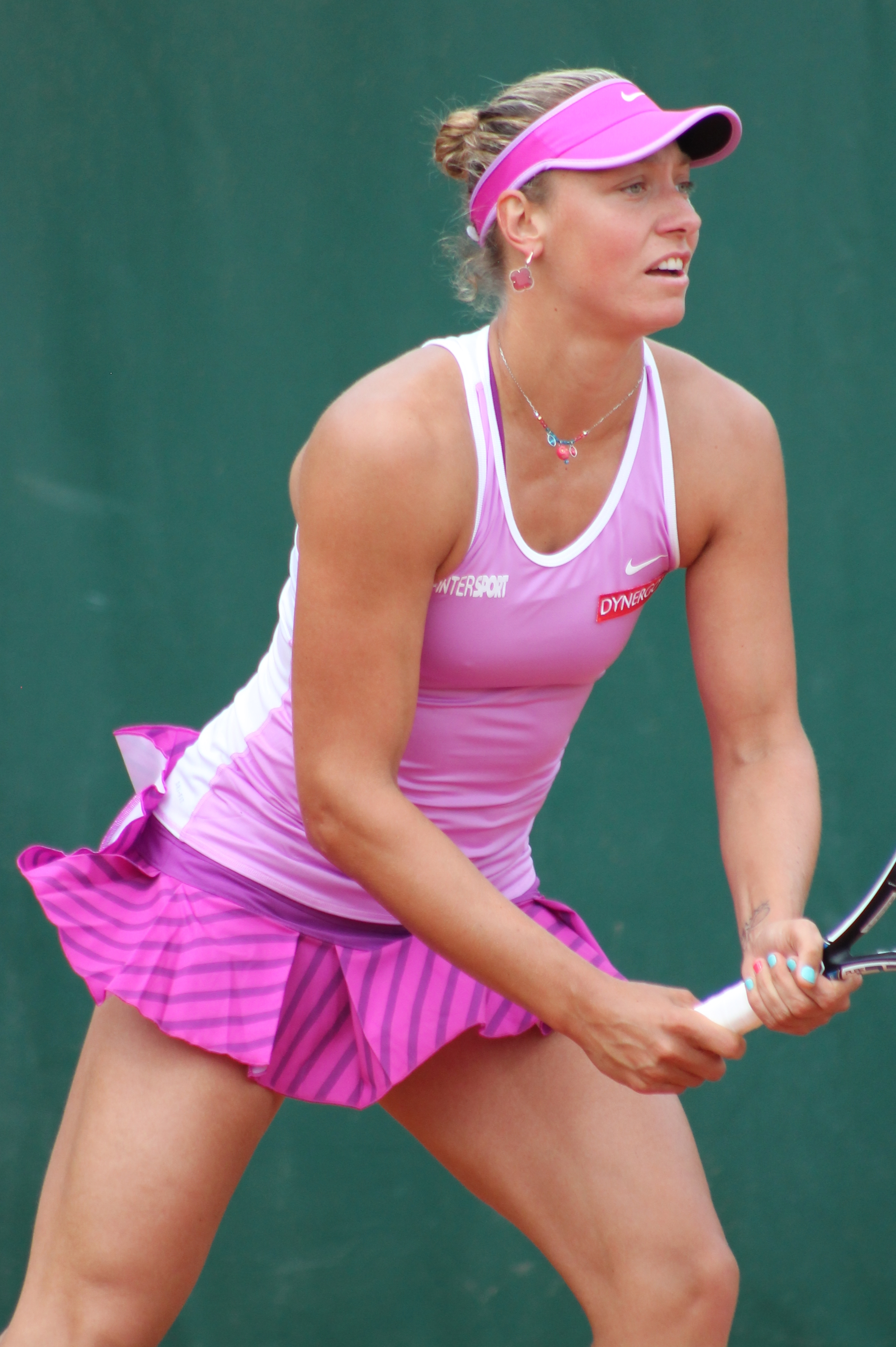
Wickmayer at the 2015 French Open

Wickmayer started the year at Auckland where she lost in the first round to wildcard Taylor Townsend. Playing in Sydney at the Sydney International, Wickmayer lost in the first round of qualifying to Tímea Babos. In Melbourne at the Australian Open, Wickmayer upset 23rd seed Anastasia Pavlyuchenkova in the first round and beat Lara Arruabarrena in the second. In round three, she upset 14th seed Sara Errani to reach the fourth round for the first time since 2010. In the fourth round, she lost to third seed Simona Halep.

As a wildcard at the Diamond Games, Wickmayer was defeated in the first round by Barbora Záhlavová-Strýcová. In Mexico at the Monterrey Open, Wickmayer lost in the first round to fourth seed and eventual champion, Timea Bacsinszky. At the Indian Wells Open, Wickmayer lost in the second round to second seed Maria Sharapova. At Miami, she was defeated in the first round by Sloane Stephens. Competing in Poland at the Katowice Open, she lost in the first round to top seed and home crowd favorite Agnieszka Radwańska.

Wickmayer began clay-court season at the Prague Open with wins over eighth seed Camila Giorgi, Aleksandra Krunić, and qualifier Danka Kovinić. Wickmayer then fell in her semifinal match to top seed Karolína Plíšková. Seeded sixth at the Empire Slovak Open, she was defeated in the second round by Jeļena Ostapenko. In Germany at the Nürnberger Versicherungscup, Wickmayer lost in the first round to Evgeniya Rodina. At the French Open, she lost in the first round to 19th seed Elina Svitolina.

Wickmayer began grass-court season by competing at the first edition of the Nottingham Open. In the first round, she beat fourth seed Karin Knapp. In the second round, she defeated Bojana Jovanovski. In the quarterfinals, Wickmayer faced fifth seed Alison Riske. Riske led 6–2, 2–0 before Wickmayer had to retire due to illness. Wickmayer lost in the final round of qualifying at Birmingham to Kateryna Bondarenko. In Eastbourne, she was defeated in the first round of qualifying by 15th seed Christina McHale. In Wimbledon, she lost her first-round match to Elizaveta Kulichkova.

After Wimbledon, Wickmayer competed at the İstanbul Cup where she was defeated in the first round by fourth seed Alizé Cornet.

Wickmayer started her US Open Series at the Rogers Cup where she advanced to the main draw with wins over Donna Vekić and eighth seed Julia Görges. In the first round, she was defeated by fellow qualifier Lesia Tsurenko. Seeded fourth at the Vancouver Open, Wickmayer reached the semifinals with wins over Canadian wildcard Gabriela Dabrowski, qualifier Julia Glushko, and Nao Hibino. In her semifinal match, she lost to seventh seed and eventual champion Johanna Konta. Ranked 92 at the US Open, Wickmayer beat 2010 French Open champion, Francesca Schiavone, in the first round. In the second round, she lost to 20th seed Victoria Azarenka.

Wickmayer competed at the Japan Women's Open and reached the final, after defeating Kateřina Siniaková, fifth seed Johanna Larsson, Kateryna Bondarenko, and seventh seed Ajla Tomljanović. In the final, Wickmayer beat Magda Linette. This was her first WTA singles title win since 2010. Wickmayer continued her good form at the Guangzhou International Open. She advanced to the semifinals beating Magda Linette, Monica Puig, and sixth seed and defending champion Monica Niculescu. Wickmayer was defeated in the semifinals by fourth seed Jelena Janković. Wickmayer lost in the first round of qualifying at the Ladies Linz to Jana Čepelová. In the Luxembourg Open, Wickmayer was defeated in the first round by seventh seed Barbora Strýcová. Her final tournament of the year was the Carlsbad Classic, which was a new tournament added to the WTA 125 series. As the top seed, Wickmayer reached the final defeating Julia Boserup, Kristie Ahn, CiCi Bellis, and Maria Sakkari. In the final, she beat fifth seed Nicole Gibbs to win her first WTA Challenger title.

Wickmayer ended the year ranked 49.

=== 2016: Fifth career title ===
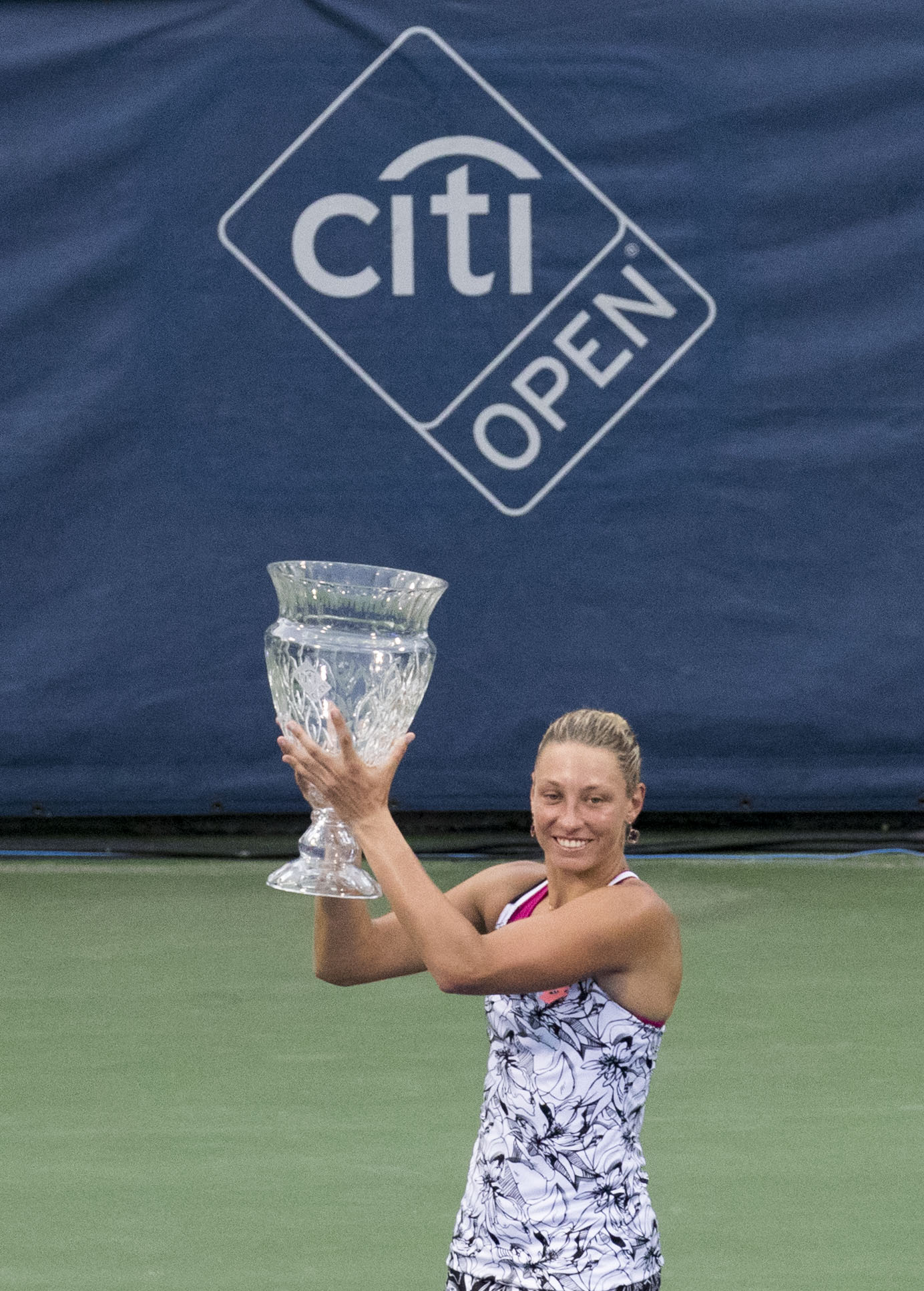
Wickmayer holding the trophy after winning the 2016 Washington Open, her fifth WTA title

Wickmayer began the year at Brisbane International. In the first round, she lost to Dominika Cibulková. Playing at the Sydney International, Wickmayer was defeated in the second round of qualifying by Lauren Davis. Ranked 41 at the Australian Open, Wickmayer was defeated in the first round by Magdaléna Rybáriková.

In February, Wickmayer competed at the St. Petersburg Ladies' Trophy and beat Jeļena Ostapenko in the first round. She fell in the next round to second seed and eventual champion, Roberta Vinci. Seeded eighth at the Abierto Mexicano, Wickmayer reached the semifinals where she lost to second seed Sloane Stephens. At the Monterrey Open, Wickmayer was defeated in the second round by fourth seed Johanna Konta. Competing at the Indian Wells Open, Wickmayer lost in the second round to 26th seed Sam Stosur. After Indian Wells, Wickmayer played at the San Antonio Open, one of the WTA 125 tournaments. Seeded fourth, she lost in the first round to Lauren Davis. In Miami, Wickmayer won her first-round match over Karin Knapp. In the second round, she upset 11th seed Lucie Šafářová. In the third round, she was defeated by wildcard Heather Watson.

Wickmayer began her clay-court season at the İstanbul Cup. Seeded second, she lost in the first round to Andreea Mitu. Seeded eighth at the Prague Open, Wickmayer lost in the first round to Camila Giorgi. At the Madrid Open, Wickmayer was defeated in the first round by 12th seed Elina Svitolina. In her final stop before Roland Garros at the Italian Open, she was defeated in the first round by 11th seed Timea Bacsinszky. Wickmayer had a great run at the French Open. In the first round, she beat Alexandra Dulgheru and upset 27th seed Ekaterina Makarova in the second. In round three, she lost to fourth seed and eventual champion, Garbiñe Muguruza.

Wickmayer began her grass-court season at the Nottingham Open. Seeded fifth, she was defeated in the first round by lucky loser Andrea Hlaváčková. Wickmayer played at the Birmingham Classic where she defeated Caroline Wozniacki in the first round. In the second, she upset ninth seed Johanna Konta. In the quarterfinals, she lost to CoCo Vandeweghe. At the Eastbourne International, Wickmayer was defeated in the first round by Kristina Mladenovic. Ranked 46 in Wimbledon, she lost in the first round to 15th seed Karolína Plíšková.

Wickmayer started on the US Open Series at the Washington Open. As the seventh seed, she reached the final after wins over Madison Brengle, Zhang Shuai, fourth seed Kristina Mladenovic, and sixth seed Yulia Putintseva, and she won the tournament defeating Lauren Davis in straight sets. This was Wickmayer's fifth career singles title. In doubles, partnering with Monica Niculescu, she and Niculescu both won the 2016 Washington Open doubles title defeating Shuko Aoyama/Risa Ozaki in the final. Ranked 36 at the Rogers Cup, Wickmayer lost in the first round to qualifier Kristína Kučová. Representing Belgium at the Rio Olympics, Wickmayer was defeated in the first round by Barbora Strýcová. In doubles, she teamed with Flipkens. They reached the second round losing to fourth seeds Muguruza/Suárez Navarro. Ranked 38 at the US Open, Wickmayer lost in the first round to Julia Görges.

In the Asian swing, she first played at the Japan Women's Open, where she was the second seed and the defending champion. Wickmayer lost her first-round match to Viktorija Golubic. As a result, she failed to defend her title. Her ranking fell from 39 to 51. In Tokyo at the Pan Pacific Open, she was defeated in the first round by qualifier Aliaksandra Sasnovich. After Tokyo, Wickmayer competed at the Wuhan Open. She lost in the second round to seventh seed Suárez Navarro. In Beijing at the China Open, Wickmayer was defeated in the second round by fourth seed Simona Halep. Wickmayer's final tournament of the year was the Luxembourg Open where she lost in the first round to Anna Karolína Schmiedlová.

Wickmayer ended the year ranked 51.

=== 2017: Out of the top 100 ===
Wickmayer began the year at Auckland where she beat Johanna Larsson in the first round. In the second round, she lost to eighth seed and eventual finalist Ana Konjuh. At the Australian Open, Wickmayer was defeated in the first round by Lucie Šafářová. Šafářová saved a total of nine match points to defeat Wickmayer.

In February, she played for Belgium in the Fed Cup tie versus Romania. Wickmayer only played one rubber, and she won, beating Sorana Cîrstea. In the end, Belgium defeated Romania 3–1. Seeded fifth at the Hungarian Ladies Open, Wickmayer reached the quarterfinals where she lost to third seed Julia Görges. The week after the tournament in Budapest, Wickmayer played at the Abierto Mexicano Telcel, where she was defeated in the first round by wildcard Daniela Hantuchová. In March, Wickmayer played at Indian Wells where she won her first-round match over Laura Siegemund. She lost in the second round to 24th seed Daria Gavrilova. Wickmayer was defeated in the first round at the Miami Open by Lucie Šafářová.

Competing at the Rabat Grand Prix, her first clay-court season tournament of the year, Wickmayer was defeated in the first round by Ekaterina Makarova. Seeded second at Cagnes-sur-Mer, she lost in the first round to qualifier Katarina Zavatska. As the top seed at the Empire Slovak Open, Wickmayer made it to the quarterfinals where she was defeated by sixth seed and eventual champion, Markéta Vondroušová. Wickmayer played her final tournament before the French Open at the Nürnberger Versicherungscup. There, she lost in the second round to second seed Yulia Putintseva. Ranked 69 at the French Open, Wickmayer was defeated in the first round by 26th seed Daria Kasatkina.

Wickmayer began her grass-court season at the Nottingham Open. In the first round, she beat qualifier Elizaveta Kulichkova. In the second round, she lost to top seed and eventual finalist Johanna Konta. At the Mallorca Open, Wickmayer lost in the final round of qualifying to Ons Jabeur. Ranked 96 at Wimbledon, she beat Kateryna Bondarenko in the first round. In the second round, she lost to 14th seed and eventual champion Garbiñe Muguruza.

At the Vancouver Open, Wickmayer lost in the second round to Canadian wildcard Carol Zhao despite bageling her in the first set. Ranked No. 129 at the US Open, she was defeated in the second round by qualifier Kaia Kanepi.

Wickmayer had her best tournament result of the season at the Guangzhou Open. She made it all the way to the semifinals beating qualifier Lesley Kerkhove, top seed Peng Shuai, and sixth seed Alizé Cornet. She was stopped in her semifinal match by Aleksandra Krunić. At the Upper Austria Ladies Linz, Wickmayer lost in the second round of qualifying to Sofya Zhuk. Wickmayer qualified for the Luxembourg Open defeating Eléonora Molinaro, Alexandra Cadanțu, and Antonia Lottner. In the first round, she lost to Heather Watson. In Poitiers at the Internationaux Féminins de la Vienne, Wickmayer was defeated in the quarterfinals by Belinda Bencic. Seeded fifth at the Hua Hin Championships, she won her first-round match over Vera Zvonareva. She lost in the second round to Luksika Kumkhum. Seeded fifth at the Taipei Challenger, Wickmayer was defeated in the first round by qualifier Vitalia Diatchenko. Wickmayer's final tournament of the year was at the Mumbai Open. Seeded third, she lost in the quarterfinals to Sabina Sharipova.

Wickmayer ended the year ranked 112.

=== 2018: Continued struggles with form, injury ===
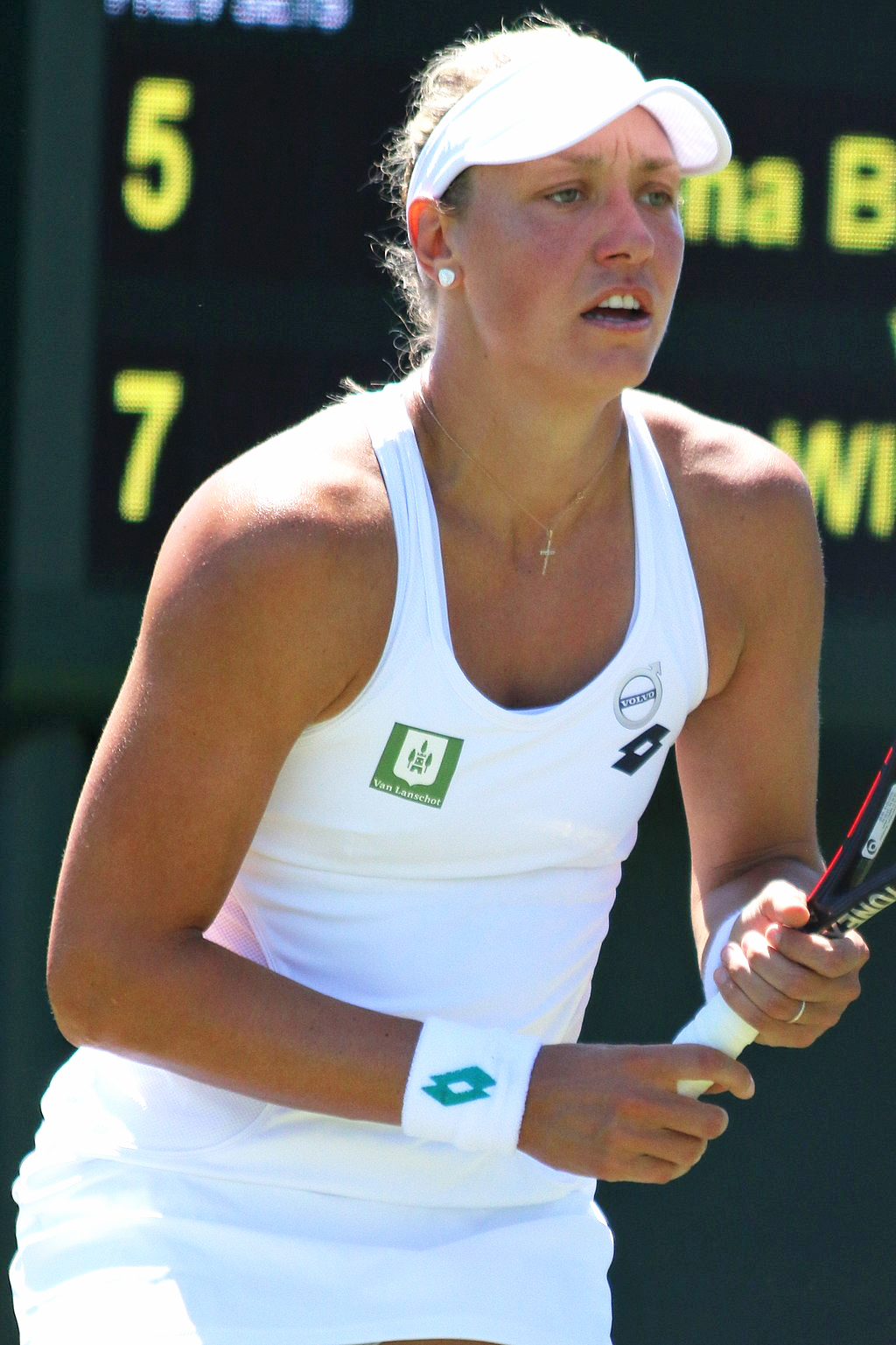
Wickmayer at the 2018 Wimbledon Championships

Wickmayer began at the Australian Open where she lost in the second round of qualifying to Australian wildcard Priscilla Hon.

After the Australian Open, Wickmayer competed at the first edition of the Newport Beach Challenger in California where she was defeated in the first round by seventh seed Ajla Tomljanović. Seeded second at the $25k tournament in Surprise, Wickmayer won the title defeating Ann Li, Ashley Kratzer, eighth seed Julia Boserup, seventh seed Marie Bouzková, and Ana Sofía Sánchez. Seeded fifth at the $25k tournament in Rancho Santa Fe, Wickmayer was defeated in the first round by Danielle Lao. At the Indian Wells Challenger, she beat sixth seed Francesca Schiavone and Sofia Kenin to advance to the quarterfinals. She lost her quarterfinal match to the fourth seed and eventual finalist Kateryna Bondarenko. Wickmayer qualified for the Indian Wells Open defeating 24th seed Viktorija Golubic and Jil Teichmann. She won her first WTA Tour match of the season by beating American wildcard Kayla Day in the first round. She lost in the second round to 26th seed Daria Gavrilova. Wickmayer was defeated in the final round of qualifying at the Miami Open by Monica Niculescu.

Seeded sixth at the Zhengzhou Open, Wickmayer reached the semifinals after wins over Vera Zvonareva, wildcard Wang Xiyu, and qualifier Mai Minokoshi. She lost in her semifinal match to fourth seed Wang Yafan. Seeded fourth at the Industrial Bank Cup, Wickmayer advanced to the quarterfinals where she was defeated by fifth seed Naomi Broady. Seeded third at the Kunming Open, she won her first two rounds over qualifier Natalija Kostić and Sabina Sharipova. She lost in the quarterfinals to eventual champion Irina Khromacheva. Seeded seventh at the Empire Slovak Open, she was defeated in the first round by Françoise Abanda. Ranked 105 at the French Open, Wickmayer lost in the first round to Sam Stosur.

Seeded fourth at the Surbiton Trophy, her first grass-court tournament of the year, Wickmayer beat both Bojana Jovanovski Petrović and qualifier Victoria Duval to reach the quarterfinals where Harriet Dart defeated her. At the Nottingham Open, Wickmayer suffered a first-round loss at the hands of British wildcard Katie Boulter. Ranked 101 at the Wimbledon Championships, Wickmayer had two comfortable victories over Germans Mona Barthel and Andrea Petkovic. However, she lost her third-round match to Donna Vekić.

In Montreal at the Rogers Cup, Wickmayer was defeated in the first round of qualifying by American Caroline Dolehide. Seeded second at the Vancouver Open, Wickmayer lost in the second round to Rebecca Marino. At the US Open, Wickmayer was defeated in the first round by fifth seed Petra Kvitová.

Wickmayer ended her 2018 season before the start of the Asian swing due to injuries. She ended the season ranked 113.

=== 2019: Two WTA 125 doubles finals ===
Wickmayer began her season at the Brisbane International. She lost in the first round of qualifying to Australian wildcard Zoe Hives. At the Australian Open, Wickmayer was defeated in the first round of qualifying by Kaja Juvan.

Seeded 11th at the Newport Beach Challenger, she suffered a second-round loss at the hands of Allie Kiick. Seeded sixth at the Midland Tennis Classic, Wickmayer beat both Lu Jiajing and qualifier Ann Li to reach the quarterfinals. She was defeated in her quarterfinal match by qualifier Robin Anderson.

As the top seed at Shrewsbury, Wickmayer reached the final after wins over Lesley Kerkhove, qualifier Jessika Ponchet, British wildcard and defending champion Maia Lumsden, and Harmony Tan. She lost in the final to second seed Vitalia Diatchenko. At the Indian Wells Challenger, Wickmayer lost in the second round to second seed Alison Riske. Wickmayer was defeated in the final round of qualifying at the Indian Wells Open to Misaki Doi. Playing at the first edition of the Abierto Zapopan, she was defeated in the second round by seventh seed Kristýna Plíšková.

In Miami, Wickmayer qualified for the main draw beating Veronika Kudermetova and Kristýna Plíšková. She won her first-round match over Sachia Vickery. In the second round, Wickmayer pushed top seed Naomi Osaka to three sets, but she ended losing the match.

=== 2020: Loss of form, hiatus ===
Wickmayer kicked off her 2020 season at the Auckland Open where she lost in the first round of qualifying to Nao Hibino. At the Australian Open, Wickmayer was defeated in the second round of qualifying by Ann Li.

Seeded 12th at the Newport Beach Challenger, she retired during her third-round match against fifth seed Madison Brengle due to a lower back injury. Seeded fifth at the Midland Classic, Wickmayer reached the quarterfinal round where she lost to American wildcard Irina Falconi. Competing at the first edition of the Kentucky Open in Nicholasville, she fell in the quarterfinal round to third seed Madison Brengle. As the top seed at the Shoebacca Women's Open in Rancho Santa Fe, California, she made it to the semifinals where she was defeated by fifth seed Rebecca Šramková. Playing at the Indian Wells Challenger, Wickmayer lost in the quarterfinal round to 13th seed and eventual finalist Misaki Doi.

At the US Open, she lost in the first round to second seed Sofia Kenin. She ended her season early after the postponed 2020 French Open.

=== 2022–23: Comeback, Wimbledon second round, third doubles title ===
She qualified for the 2022 Wimbledon Championships after an absence of two years in a major main draw (since the US Open 2020) to make her 13th appearance at this major. She made the second round defeating Zhu Lin.

She won the doubles title, partnering with Kristina Mladenovic, at the Korea Open defeating top seeds Asia Muhammad and Sabrina Santamaria from the United States. It was her first title since 2016.

In 2023, she qualified for Wimbledon with a win over Laura Siegemund in the last round of qualifying to make her 14th main-draw appearance.

=== 2025: First doubles major quarterfinal, retirement ===
In May 2025, Wickmayer announced her plans to retire from the sport after that year's Wimbledon Championships. In June 2025, Wickmayer participated in the French Open with a protected ranking but was eliminated in the first round by Victoria Azarenka who scored a double bagel in 48 minutes. She partnered with Irina-Camelia Begu and made the quarterfinals of the doubles event.

At Wimbledon, Wickmayer lost in the first round to Renata Zarazúa in what was the final singles match of her career. She lost in the first round of doubles competition a day later partnering Anastasija Sevastova.

== Career statistics ==
=== Grand Slam performance ===
Key
W	F	SF	QF	#R	RR	Q#	DNQ	A	NH

(W) winner; (F) finalist; (SF) semifinalist; (QF) quarterfinalist; (#R) rounds 4, 3, 2, 1; (RR) round-robin stage; (Q#) qualification round; (DNQ) did not qualify; (A) absent; (NH) not held; (SR) strike rate (events won / competed); (W–L) win–loss record.
To avoid confusion and double counting, these charts are updated at the conclusion of a tournament or when the player's participation has ended.

==== Singles ====
Tournament	2008	2009	2010	2011	2012	2013	2014	2015	2016	2017	2018	2019	2020	2021	2022	2023	2024	2025	W–L	Win%
Australian Open	Q2	1R	4R	2R	1R	3R	2R	4R	1R	1R	Q2	Q1	Q2	A	A	A	1R	A	10–10	50%
French Open	1R	2R	3R	3R	1R	1R	2R	1R	3R	1R	1R	Q1	Q1	A	A	Q2	A	1R	8–12	40%
Wimbledon	1R	1R	3R	4R	3R	1R	2R	1R	1R	2R	3R	2R	NH	A	2R	1R	A	1R	13–15	46%
US Open	1R	SF	4R	2R	2R	1R	1R	2R	1R	2R	1R	Q2	1R	A	Q2	2R	A	A	13–13	50%
Win–loss	0–3	6–4	10–4	7–4	3–4	2–4	3–4	4–4	2–4	2–4	2–3	1–1	0–1	0–0	1–1	1–2	0–1	0–2	44–50	47%

==== Doubles ====
Tournament	2008	2009	2010	2011	2012	2013	2014	2015	2016	2017	...	2020	2021	...	2025	W–L
Australian Open	A	1R	2R	1R	A	2R	1R	1R	1R	1R		A	A		A	2–8
French Open	1R	1R	A	A	1R	A	1R	1R	1R	2R		1R	A		QF	4–9
Wimbledon	A	2R	1R	A	1R	2R	2R	A	2R	A		NH	A		1R	4–7
US Open	1R	1R	1R	A	A	1R	1R	A	1R	A		A	A		A	0–6
Win–loss	0–2	1–4	1–3	0–1	0–2	2–3	1–4	0–2	1–4	1–2		0–1	0–0		3–2	10–30

Awards
Preceded by (Russia) Dinara Safina	WTA Most Improved Player; 2009	Succeeded by (Italy) Francesca Schiavone
