= 2011 Empire Trnava Cup =

- Date: 1 – 7 August
- Edition: 3rd
- Location: Trnava, Slovakia

Champions

Singles
- (Austria) Yvonne Meusburger

Doubles
- (Slovakia) Janette Husárová / (Czech Republic) Renata Voráčová
| ← 2010 · | Empire Trnava Cup | · 2012 → |

The 2011 Empire Trnava Cup was a professional tennis tournament played on clay courts. It was the third edition of the tournament, part of the 2011 ITF Women's Circuit, and featured a prize fund of 50,000 US Dollars. It took place in Trnava, Slovakia between 1 and 7 August 2011.

== WTA entrants ==
=== Seeds ===
| Country | Player | Rank^{1} | Seed |
|---|---|---|---|
| CZE | Sandra Záhlavová | 126 | 1 |
| CZE | Renata Voráčová | 127 | 2 |
| AUT | Yvonne Meusburger | 139 | 3 |
| ROU | Alexandra Cadanţu | 151 | 4 |
| RUS | Ekaterina Ivanova | 174 | 5 |
| POL | Magda Linette | 175 | 6 |
| BUL | Elitsa Kostova | 176 | 7 |
| SVK | Kristína Kučová | 178 | 8 |

- ^{1} Rankings are as of July 25, 2011.

=== Other entrants ===
The following players received wildcards into the singles main draw:

- (Czech Republic) Klára Fabíková
- (Germany) Michaela Frlicka
- (Czech Republic) Veronika Kolářová
- (Slovakia) Nikola Vajdová

The following players received entry from the qualifying draw:

- (Croatia) Dijana Banoveć
- (Switzerland) Viktorija Golubic
- (Slovakia) Anna Karolína Schmiedlová
- (Slovakia) Romana Tabak

== Champions ==
=== Singles ===
(Austria) Yvonne Meusburger def. (Bulgaria) Elitsa Kostova, 0–6, 6–2, 6–0

=== Doubles ===
(Slovakia) Janette Husárová / (Czech Republic) Renata Voráčová def. (Slovakia) Jana Čepelová / (Slovakia) Lenka Wienerová, 7–6^{(7–2)}, 6–1
