= 2013 Empire Slovak Open =

- Date: 6–12 May
- Edition: 5th
- Location: Trnava, Slovakia

Champions

Singles
- (Czech Republic) Barbora Záhlavová-Strýcová

Doubles
- (Bosnia and Herzegovina) Mervana Jugić-Salkić / (Czech Republic) Renata Voráčová
← 2012 ·	Empire Slovak Open	· 2014 →

The 2013 Empire Slovak Open was a professional tennis tournament played on outdoor clay courts. It was the fifth edition of the tournament which was part of the 2013 ITF Women's Circuit, offering a total of $75,000 in prize money. It took place in Trnava, Slovakia, on 6–12 May 2013.

== WTA entrants ==
=== Seeds ===
Country	Player	Rank^{1}	Seed
SVK	Jana Čepelová	83	1
ITA	Karin Knapp	90	2
SRB	Vesna Dolonc	100	3
HUN	Melinda Czink	103	4
CZE	Kristýna Plíšková	105	5
USA	Alexa Glatch	116	6
FRA	Stéphanie Foretz Gacon	120	7
GRE	Eleni Daniilidou	124	8

- ^{1} Rankings as of 29 April 2013

=== Other entrants ===
The following players received wildcards into the singles main draw:

- (Hungary) Dalma Gálfi
- (Czech Republic) Kateřina Siniaková
- (Slovakia) Petra Uberalová
- (Slovakia) Natália Vajdová

The following players received entry from the qualifying draw:

- (Poland) Katarzyna Kawa
- (Czech Republic) Petra Krejsová
- (Slovakia) Kristína Kučová
- (Czech Republic) Renata Voráčová

The following player received entry into the singles main draw as a lucky loser:

- (Slovakia) Vivien Juhászová

The following player received entry by a Protected Ranking:

- (Croatia) Ajla Tomljanović

== Champions ==
=== Singles ===
- (Czech Republic) Barbora Záhlavová-Strýcová def. (Italy) Karin Knapp 6–2, 6–4

=== Doubles ===
- (Bosnia and Herzegovina) Mervana Jugić-Salkić / (Czech Republic) Renata Voráčová def. (Slovakia) Jana Čepelová / (Slovakia) Anna Karolína Schmiedlová 6–1, 6–1
