= 2011 Empire Trnava Cup – Singles =

Singles
- 2011 Empire Trnava Cup

Final
- Champions: (Austria) Yvonne Meusburger
- Runners-up: (Bulgaria) Elitsa Kostova
- Score: 0–6, 6–2, 6–0

Events
Singles	Doubles
← 2010 ·	Empire Trnava Cup	· 2012 →

Sandra Záhlavová was the defending champion, but lost in the Quarterfinals to Magda Linette.

Yvonne Meusburger won the title, defeating Elitsa Kostova in the final, 0–6, 6–2, 6–0.

== Seeds ==
1. (Czech Republic) Sandra Záhlavová (quarterfinals)
2. (Czech Republic) Renata Voráčová (semifinals)
3. (Austria) Yvonne Meusburger (champion)
4. (Romania) Alexandra Cadanţu (quarterfinals)
5. (Russia) Ekaterina Ivanova (second round)
6. (Poland) Magda Linette (semifinals)
7. (Bulgaria) Elitsa Kostova (final)
8. (Slovakia) Kristína Kučová (quarterfinals)

== Main draw ==
=== Key ===
- Q = Qualifier
- WC = Wild card
- LL = Lucky loser
- Alt = Alternate
- SE = Special exempt
- PR = Protected ranking
- ITF = ITF entry
- JE = Junior exempt
- w/o = Walkover
- r = Retired
- d = Defaulted
- SR = Special ranking

=== Finals ===
Semifinals
6	(Poland) Magda Linette	6	4	3
7	(Bulgaria) Elitsa Kostova	1	6	6
3	(Austria) Yvonne Meusburger	6	6
2	(Czech Republic) Renata Voráčová	0	4

Final
7	(Bulgaria) Elitsa Kostova	6	2	0
3	(Austria) Yvonne Meusburger	0	6	6

=== Top half ===
First round
1	(Czech Republic) S Záhlavová	7^{7}	6
(Slovakia) J Čepelová	6^{3}	3
(Slovakia) L Wienerová	6	6
(Bulgaria) D Evtimova	4	2
(Switzerland) C Perrin	6	7
(Liechtenstein) S Vogt	4	5
Q	(Switzerland) V Golubic	2	1
6	(Poland) M Linette	6	6
4	(Romania) A Cadanţu	6	6
WC	(Czech Republic) K Fabíková	4	3
(Bosnia and Herzegovina) J Tinjić	3^{r}
(Ukraine) L Kichenok	2
(Netherlands) B Schoofs	6	6^{1}	6
Q	(Croatia) D Banoveć	3	7^{7}	2
(Serbia) A Krunić	4	3
7	(Bulgaria) E Kostova	6	6

Second round
1	(Czech Republic) S Záhlavová	6	6
(Slovakia) L Wienerová	2	2
(Switzerland) C Perrin	6	2	3
6	(Poland) M Linette	3	6	6
4	(Romania) A Cadanţu	6	7
(Ukraine) L Kichenok	3	5
(Netherlands) B Schoofs	3	6	3
7	(Bulgaria) E Kostova	6	4	6

Quarterfinals
1	(Czech Republic) S Záhlavová	3	2
6	(Poland) M Linette	6	6
4	(Romania) A Cadanţu	7^{8}	3	6^{3}
7	(Bulgaria) E Kostova	6^{6}	6	7^{7}

Semifinals
6	(Poland) M Linette	6	4	3
7	(Bulgaria) E Kostova	1	6	6

=== Bottom half ===
First round
8	(Slovakia) K Kučová	6	6
(Poland) P Kania	2	2
WC	(Germany) M Frlicka	2	2
Q	(Slovakia) R Tabak	6	6
(Spain) E Fernández-Brugués	6	7
(Slovakia) M Hončová	3	5
Q	(Slovakia) AK Schmiedlová	0	7	4
3	(Austria) Y Meusburger	6	5	6
5	(Russia) E Ivanova	6	6
(Spain) L Costas	4	2
WC	(Czech Republic) V Kolářová	4	1
(Slovakia) L Juríková	6	6
(Slovakia) M Pochabová	6	6
WC	(Slovakia) N Vajdová	3	1
(Croatia) A Mijačika	2	5
2	(Czech Republic) R Voráčová	6	7

Second round
8	(Slovakia) K Kučová	6	6
Q	(Slovakia) R Tabak	2	3
(Spain) E Fernández-Brugués	3	2
3	(Austria) Y Meusburger	6	6
5	(Russia) E Ivanova	6^{5}	5
(Slovakia) L Juríková	7^{7}	7
(Slovakia) M Pochabová	3	2
2	(Czech Republic) R Voráčová	6	6

Quarterfinals
8	(Slovakia) K Kučová	7^{7}	3	4
3	(Austria) Y Meusburger	6^{5}	6	6
(Slovakia) L Juríková	3	4
2	(Czech Republic) R Voráčová	6	6

Semifinals
3	(Austria) Y Meusburger	6	6
2	(Czech Republic) R Voráčová	0	4
