= 2016 Empire Slovak Open =

- Date: 9–15 May
- Edition: 8th
- Category: ITF Women's Circuit
- Prize money: $100,000
- Surface: Clay
- Location: Trnava, Slovakia

Champions

Singles
- (Czech Republic) Kateřina Siniaková

Doubles
- (Russia) Anna Kalinskaya / (Slovakia) Tereza Mihalíková
← 2015 ·	Empire Slovak Open	· 2017 →

The 2016 Empire Slovak Open was a professional tennis tournament played on outdoor clay courts. It was the eighth edition of the tournament and part of the 2016 ITF Women's Circuit, offering a total of $100,000 in prize money. It took place in Trnava, Slovakia, on 9–15 May 2016.

== Singles main draw entrants ==
=== Seeds ===
Country	Player	Rank^{1}	Seed
SVK	Magdaléna Rybáriková	72	1
TUR	Çağla Büyükakçay	83	2
LAT	Anastasija Sevastova	86	3
KAZ	Zarina Diyas	94	4
CZE	Kristýna Plíšková	100	5
POL	Magda Linette	102	6
~~SUI~~	~~Stefanie Vögele~~	~~105~~	~~7~~
ROU	Andreea Mitu	110	8

- ^{1} Rankings as of 2 May 2016.

=== Other entrants ===
The following players received wildcards into the singles main draw:

- (Russia) Anna Blinkova
- (Slovakia) Viktória Kužmová
- (Slovakia) Tereza Mihalíková
- (Slovakia) Rebecca Šramková

The following players received entry from the qualifying draw:

- (Romania) Nicoleta Dascălu
- (Slovakia) Lenka Juríková
- (Czech Republic) Markéta Vondroušová
- (Ukraine) Dayana Yastremska

The following players received entry by lucky loser spots:

- (Netherlands) Arantxa Rus
- (Bulgaria) Viktoriya Tomova

The following player received entry by a protected ranking:

- (Ukraine) Yuliya Beygelzimer

== Champions ==
=== Singles ===
- (Czech Republic) Kateřina Siniaková def. (Latvia) Anastasija Sevastova, 7–6^{(7–4)}, 5–7, 6–0

=== Doubles ===
- (Russia) Anna Kalinskaya / (Slovakia) Tereza Mihalíková def. (Russia) Evgeniya Rodina / (Latvia) Anastasija Sevastova, 6–1, 7–6^{(7–4)}
