= 2014 Empire Slovak Open =

- Date: 5–11 May
- Edition: 6th
- Category: ITF Women's Circuit
- Prize money: $75,000
- Surface: Clay
- Location: Trnava, Slovakia

Champions

Singles
- (Slovakia) Anna Karolína Schmiedlová

Doubles
- (Liechtenstein) Stephanie Vogt / (China) Zheng Saisai
← 2013 ·	Empire Slovak Open	· 2015 →

The 2014 Empire Slovak Open was a professional tennis tournament played on outdoor clay courts. It was the sixth edition of the tournament and part of the 2014 ITF Women's Circuit, offering a total of $75,000 in prize money. It took place in Trnava, Slovakia, on 5–11 May 2014.

== Singles main draw entrants ==
=== Seeds ===
Country	Player	Rank^{1}	Seed
CZE	Barbora Záhlavová-Strýcová	56	1
SVK	Anna Karolína Schmiedlová	69	2
ISR	Julia Glushko	96	3
CRO	Petra Martić	105	4
GER	Anna-Lena Friedsam	108	5
SRB	Jovana Jakšić	112	6
~~CZE~~	~~Andrea Hlaváčková~~	~~113~~	~~7~~
SRB	Vesna Dolonc	115	8

- ^{1} Rankings as of 28 April 2014

=== Other entrants ===
The following players received wildcards into the singles main draw:

- (Hungary) Dalma Gálfi
- (Slovakia) Viktória Kužmová
- (Slovakia) Kristína Schmiedlová
- (Czech Republic) Tereza Smitková

The following players received entry from the qualifying draw:

- (Czech Republic) Denisa Allertová
- (Russia) Margarita Gasparyan
- (Romania) Andreea Mitu
- (Czech Republic) Renata Voráčová

The following player received entry by a protected ranking:

- (Russia) Evgeniya Rodina

The following player received entry into the singles main draw as a lucky loser:

- (Czech Republic) Barbora Krejčíková

== Champions ==
=== Singles ===
- (Slovakia) Anna Karolína Schmiedlová def. (Czech Republic) Barbora Záhlavová-Strýcová 6–4, 6–2

=== Doubles ===
- (Liechtenstein) Stephanie Vogt / (China) Zheng Saisai def. (Russia) Margarita Gasparyan / (Russia) Evgeniya Rodina 6–4, 6–2
