= 2016 Empire Slovak Open – Singles =

Singles
- 2016 Empire Slovak Open

Final
- Champion: (Czech Republic) Kateřina Siniaková
- Runner-up: (Latvia) Anastasija Sevastova
- Score: 7–6^{(7–4)}, 5–7, 6–0

Events
Singles	Doubles
← 2015 ·	Empire Slovak Open	· 2017 →

Danka Kovinić was the defending champion, but chose to participate in Rome instead.

Kateřina Siniaková won the title, defeating Anastasija Sevastova in the final, 7–6^{(7–4)}, 5–7, 6–0.

== Seeds ==
1. (Slovakia) Magdaléna Rybáriková (first round, retired)
2. (Turkey) Çağla Büyükakçay (second round)
3. (Latvia) Anastasija Sevastova (final)
4. (Kazakhstan) Zarina Diyas (semifinals)
5. (Czech Republic) Kristýna Plíšková (quarterfinals)
6. (Poland) Magda Linette (second round)
7. (Switzerland) Stefanie Vögele (withdrew)
8. (Romania) Andreea Mitu (first round)

== Main draw ==
=== Key ===
- Q = Qualifier
- WC = Wild card
- LL = Lucky loser
- Alt = Alternate
- SE = Special exempt
- PR = Protected ranking
- ITF = ITF entry
- JE = Junior exempt
- w/o = Walkover
- r = Retired
- d = Defaulted
- SR = Special ranking

=== Finals ===
Semifinals
WC	(Slovakia) Rebecca Šramková	1	3
3	(Latvia) Anastasija Sevastova	6	6
4	(Kazakhstan) Zarina Diyas	3	6	4
(Czech Republic) Kateřina Siniaková	6	0	6

Final
3	(Latvia) Anastasija Sevastova	6^{4}	7	0
(Czech Republic) Kateřina Siniaková	7^{7}	5	6

=== Top half ===
First round
1	(Slovakia) M Rybáriková	2^{r}
WC	(Slovakia) V Kužmová	4
Q	(Czech Republic) M Vondroušová	7	4	6
(United States) A Tatishvili	5	6	3
WC	(Slovakia) R Šramková	4	7^{8}	6
(Czech Republic) B Krejčíková	6	6^{6}	4
(Slovakia) J Čepelová	4	6	6
8	(Romania) A Mitu	6	4	4
3	(Latvia) A Sevastova	6	6
WC	(Slovakia) T Mihalíková	2	4
Q	(Ukraine) D Yastremska	3	5
Q	(Romania) N Dascălu	6	7
(Czech Republic) B Štefková	3	2
(Japan) M Eguchi	6	6
(Russia) E Rodina	2	0
LL	(Bulgaria) V Tomova	6	6

Second round
WC	(Slovakia) V Kužmová	4	6	7^{7}
Q	(Czech Republic) M Vondroušová	6	3	6^{3}
WC	(Slovakia) R Šramková	7	4	6
(Slovakia) J Čepelová	5	6	3
3	(Latvia) A Sevastova	4	6	6
Q	(Romania) N Dascălu	6	3	1
(Japan) M Eguchi	6	6
LL	(Bulgaria) V Tomova	3	2

Quarterfinals
WC	(Slovakia) V Kužmová	3	4
WC	(Slovakia) R Šramková	6	6
3	(Latvia) A Sevastova	6	6
(Japan) M Eguchi	0	3

Semifinals
WC	(Slovakia) R Šramková	1	3
3	(Latvia) A Sevastova	6	6

=== Bottom half ===
First round
6	(Poland) M Linette	6^{1}	7^{7}	6
(Bulgaria) E Kostova	7^{7}	6^{5}	2
(New Zealand) M Erakovic	4	2
(Poland) P Kania	6	6
LL	(Netherlands) A Rus	6	6
PR	(Ukraine) Y Beygelzimer	1	2
WC	(Russia) A Blinkova	1	1
4	(Kazakhstan) Z Diyas	6	6
5	(Czech Republic) Kr Plíšková	6	6
(Spain) S Soler Espinosa	2	1
Q	(Slovakia) L Juríková	3	6	6
(United States) L Chirico	6	2	2
(Russia) P Leykina	4	1
(Czech Republic) K Siniaková	6	6
(Ukraine) O Fridman	4	4
2	(Turkey) Ç Büyükakçay	6	6

Second round
6	(Poland) M Linette	5	6	6^{5}
(Poland) P Kania	7	2	7^{7}
LL	(Netherlands) A Rus	2	3
4	(Kazakhstan) Z Diyas	6	6
5	(Czech Republic) Kr Plíšková	6	6
Q	(Slovakia) L Juríková	4	2
(Czech Republic) K Siniaková	6	6
2	(Turkey) Ç Büyükakçay	3	2

Quarterfinals
(Poland) P Kania	1	1
4	(Kazakhstan) Z Diyas	6	6
5	(Czech Republic) Kr Plíšková	1	7	6^{3}
(Czech Republic) K Siniaková	6	5	7^{7}

Semifinals
4	(Kazakhstan) Z Diyas	3	6	4
(Czech Republic) K Siniaková	6	0	6
