= 2012 Empire Trnava Cup – Singles =

Singles
- 2012 Empire Trnava Cup

Final
- Champion: (Latvia) Anastasija Sevastova
- Runner-up: (Croatia) Ana Savić
- Score: Walkover

Events
Singles	Doubles
← 2011 ·	Empire Trnava Cup	· 2013 →

Yvonne Meusburger was the defending champion, but lost in the second round to Bianca Botto.

Anastasija Sevastova won the title defeating Ana Savić in the final by walkover.

== Seeds ==
1. (Germany) Dinah Pfizenmaier (second round)
2. (Russia) Valeria Savinykh (semifinals)
3. (Italy) Nastassja Burnett (semifinals)
4. (Austria) Yvonne Meusburger (second round)
5. (Ukraine) Yuliya Beygelzimer (second round)
6. (Netherlands) Bibiane Schoofs (quarterfinals)
7. (Latvia) Anastasija Sevastova (champion)
8. (Bulgaria) Elitsa Kostova (quarterfinals)

== Draw ==
=== Key ===
- Q = Qualifier
- WC = Wild card
- LL = Lucky loser
- Alt = Alternate
- SE = Special exempt
- PR = Protected ranking
- ITF = ITF entry
- JE = Junior exempt
- w/o = Walkover
- r = Retired
- d = Defaulted
- SR = Special ranking

=== Finals ===
Semifinals
7	(Latvia) Anastasija Sevastova	7^{7}	6
3	(Italy) Nastassja Burnett	6^{4}	4
Q	(Croatia) Ana Savić	6	6
2	(Russia) Valeria Savinykh	4	1

Final
7	(Latvia) Anastasija Sevastova	w/o
Q	(Croatia) Ana Savić

=== Top half ===
First round
1	(Germany) D Pfizenmaier	6	6
SR	(Czech Republic) Z Ondrášková	2	0
(Hungary) R-L Jani	4	6	3
(Bulgaria) D Evtimova	6	1	6
(Russia) E Bovina	6^{2}	6	6
(Poland) K Kawa	7^{7}	2	2
(Croatia) I Akiki	0	4
7	(Latvia) A Sevastova	6	6
3	(Italy) N Burnett	7^{7}	5	6
(Croatia) A Vrljić	6^{3}	7	2
(Romania) C Mitu	6	6
WC	(Latvia) L Gulbe	1	1
(Romania) E Bogdan	6	7
WC	(Czech Republic) G Pantůčková	2	5
WC	(Slovakia) N Vajdová	2	2
6	(Netherlands) B Schoofs	6	6

Second round
1	(Germany) D Pfizenmaier	1	5
(Bulgaria) D Evtimova	6	7
(Russia) E Bovina	0	3
7	(Latvia) A Sevastova	6	6
3	(Italy) N Burnett	6	6
(Romania) C Mitu	1	4
(Romania) E Bogdan	4	5
6	(Netherlands) B Schoofs	6	7

Quarterfinals
(Bulgaria) D Evtimova	0	1
7	(Latvia) A Sevastova	6	6
3	(Italy) N Burnett	3	6	6
6	(Netherlands) B Schoofs	6	4	2

Semifinals
7	(Latvia) A Sevastova	7^{7}	6
3	(Italy) N Burnett	6^{4}	4

=== Bottom half ===
First round
5	(Ukraine) Y Beygelzimer	6	6
Q	(Czech Republic) M Borecká	0	1
Q	(Croatia) A Savić	7	6
Q	(Sweden) H Melander	5	2
(Italy) A Bona	2	2
(Peru) B Botto	6	6
(Poland) M Domachowska	3	5
4	(Austria) Y Meusburger	6	7
8	(Bulgaria) E Kostova	6	7^{9}
(Slovakia) M Hončová	2	6^{7}
WC	(Germany) M Frlicka	5	3
Q	(Austria) I Khanna	7	6
(Slovakia) R Tabak	4	3
(Austria) M Klaffner	6	6
(Czech Republic) R Voráčová	4	6	6^{4}
2	(Russia) V Savinykh	6	4	7^{7}

Second round
5	(Ukraine) Y Beygelzimer	4	5
Q	(Croatia) A Savić	6	7
(Peru) B Botto	6	7^{7}
4	(Austria) Y Meusburger	2	6^{5}
8	(Bulgaria) E Kostova	6	6
Q	(Austria) I Khanna	2	3
(Austria) M Klaffner	0	7^{7}	4
2	(Russia) V Savinykh	6	6^{1}	6

Quarterfinals
Q	(Croatia) A Savić	6	0
(Peru) B Botto	1	0^{r}
8	(Bulgaria) E Kostova	2	6	1
2	(Russia) V Savinykh	6	4	6

Semifinals
Q	(Croatia) A Savić	6	6
2	(Russia) V Savinykh	4	1
