= 2015 Empire Slovak Open – Singles =

Singles
- 2015 Empire Slovak Open

Final
- Champion: (Montenegro) Danka Kovinić
- Runner-up: (Russia) Margarita Gasparyan
- Score: 7–5, 6–3

Events
Singles	Doubles
← 2014 ·	Empire Slovak Open	· 2016 →

Anna Karolína Schmiedlová was the defending champion, but she chose not to participate.

Danka Kovinić won the title, defeating Margarita Gasparyan in the final, 7–5, 6–3.

== Seeds ==
1. (Czech Republic) Tereza Smitková (quarterfinals)
2. (Serbia) Aleksandra Krunić (quarterfinals)
3. (Czech Republic) Klára Koukalová (first round)
4. (Hungary) Tímea Babos (first round)
5. (Russia) Evgeniya Rodina (first round)
6. (Belgium) Yanina Wickmayer (second round)
7. (China) Zhang Shuai (first round)
8. (Germany) Anna-Lena Friedsam (first round)

== Main draw ==
=== Key ===
- Q = Qualifier
- WC = Wild card
- LL = Lucky loser
- Alt = Alternate
- SE = Special exempt
- PR = Protected ranking
- ITF = ITF entry
- JE = Junior exempt
- w/o = Walkover
- r = Retired
- d = Defaulted
- SR = Special ranking

=== Finals ===
Semifinals
(Latvia) Jeļena Ostapenko	2	6	4
(Montenegro) Danka Kovinić	6	2	6
(Russia) Margarita Gasparyan	7	6
(Czech Republic) Denisa Allertová	5	2

Final
(Montenegro) Danka Kovinić	7	6
(Russia) Margarita Gasparyan	5	3

=== Top half ===
First round
1	(Czech Republic) T Smitková	6	6
(Slovakia) J Čepelová	2	3
(Ukraine) Y Beygelzimer	7^{8}	6
Q	(Croatia) A Lekaj	6^{6}	1
(Latvia) J Ostapenko	6	6
(Russia) D Kasatkina	3	1
(Liechtenstein) S Vogt	2	6^{4}
6	(Belgium) Y Wickmayer	6	7^{7}
3	(Czech Republic) K Koukalová	1	4
(Montenegro) D Kovinić	6	6
(Paraguay) V Cepede Royg	4	4
WC	(Ukraine) A Kalinina	6	6
(Croatia) P Martić	6	6
WC	(Slovakia) T Mihalíková	4	4
(Poland) U Radwańska	6	6
7	(China) S Zhang	4	2

Second round
1	(Czech Republic) T Smitková	6	4	6
(Ukraine) Y Beygelzimer	2	6	1
(Latvia) J Ostapenko	6	6
6	(Belgium) Y Wickmayer	2	4
(Montenegro) D Kovinić	6	7
WC	(Ukraine) A Kalinina	0	5
(Croatia) P Martić	6	6
(Poland) U Radwańska	2	1

Quarterfinals
1	(Czech Republic) T Smitková	6	3	3
(Latvia) J Ostapenko	4	6	6
(Montenegro) D Kovinić	7^{7}	6
(Croatia) P Martić	6^{3}	4

Semifinals
(Latvia) J Ostapenko	2	6	4
(Montenegro) D Kovinić	6	2	6

=== Bottom half ===
First round
8	(Germany) A-L Friedsam	0	1
PR	(Russia) V Kan	6	6
WC	(Slovakia) K Schmiedlová	3	4
(Czech Republic) B Krejčíková	6	6
WC	(Slovakia) N Vajdová	1	2
(Russia) M Gasparyan	6	6
Q	(Croatia) J Fett	6	5	6
4	(Hungary) T Babos	4	7	4
5	(Russia) E Rodina	4	3
Q	(Slovakia) R Šramková	6	6
(Israel) S Pe'er	0	6	1
(Czech Republic) D Allertová	6	3	6
Q	(Slovakia) L Juríková	3	6	0
(Czech Republic) K Vaňková	6	3	6
(Czech Republic) R Voráčová	5	0
2	(Serbia) A Krunić	7	6

Second round
PR	(Russia) V Kan	5	7	7^{7}
(Czech Republic) B Krejčíková	7	5	6^{4}
(Russia) M Gasparyan	7	6
Q	(Croatia) J Fett	5	2
Q	(Slovakia) R Šramková	7	3	4
(Czech Republic) D Allertová	5	6	6
(Czech Republic) K Vaňková	6^{6}	0
2	(Serbia) A Krunić	7^{8}	6

Quarterfinals
PR	(Russia) V Kan	2	2
(Russia) M Gasparyan	6	6
(Czech Republic) D Allertová	6	6
2	(Serbia) A Krunić	3	1

Semifinals
(Russia) M Gasparyan	7	6
(Czech Republic) D Allertová	5	2
