= 2015 Empire Slovak Open – Doubles =

Doubles
- 2015 Empire Slovak Open

Final
- Champions: (Ukraine) Yuliya Beygelzimer (Russia) Margarita Gasparyan
- Runners-up: (Serbia) Aleksandra Krunić (Croatia) Petra Martić
- Score: 6–3, 6–2

Events
| Singles | Doubles |
| ← 2014 · | Empire Slovak Open | · 2016 → |

Stephanie Vogt and Zheng Saisai were the defending champions, however Zheng chose to participate at the 2015 China International Challenger instead. Vogt partnered Verónica Cepede Royg, but they lost in the quarterfinals.

Yuliya Beygelzimer and Margarita Gasparyan won the title, defeating Aleksandra Krunić and Petra Martić in the final, 6–3, 6–2.

== Seeds ==
1. (Czech Republic) Barbora Krejčíková / (Czech Republic) Renata Voráčová (quarterfinals)
2. (Paraguay) Verónica Cepede Royg / (Liechtenstein) Stephanie Vogt (quarterfinals)
3. (Ukraine) Yuliya Beygelzimer / (Russia) Margarita Gasparyan (champions)
4. (Serbia) Aleksandra Krunić / (Croatia) 'Petra Martić (final)

== Draw ==
=== Key ===
- Q = Qualifier
- WC = Wild card
- LL = Lucky loser
- Alt = Alternate
- SE = Special exempt
- PR = Protected ranking
- ITF = ITF entry
- JE = Junior exempt
- w/o = Walkover
- r = Retired
- d = Defaulted
- SR = Special ranking

First round
1 | (Czech Republic) B Krejčíková (Czech Republic) R Voráčová | 6 | 7^{7}
(Ukraine) A Kalinina (Latvia) J Ostapenko | 4 | 6^{4}
(Croatia) J Fett (Croatia) A Lekaj | 6 | 4 | [8]
WC | (Slovakia) T Mihalíková (Slovakia) K Schmiedlová | 2 | 6 | [10]
4 | (Serbia) A Krunić (Croatia) P Martić | 7^{7} | 4 | [10]
(Russia) N Dzalamidze (Belarus) S Pirazhenka | 6^{2} | 6 | [4]
(Czech Republic) P Krejsová (Germany) A Lottner | 4 | 3
WC | (Hungary) D Gálfi (Russia) D Kasatkina | 6 | 6
(Slovakia) J Čepelová (Slovakia) C Škamlová | 6 | 1 | [10]
(Georgia (country)) O Kalashnikova (Russia) E Rodina | 4 | 6 | [4]
(Romania) E Bogdan (Montenegro) D Kovinić | 4 | 2
3 | (Ukraine) Y Beygelzimer (Russia) M Gasparyan | 6 | 6
(Czech Republic) L Kunčíková (Czech Republic) K Stuchlá | 2 | 0
WC | (Germany) A-L Friedsam (Slovakia) L Juríková | 6 | 6
(Georgia (country)) E Gorgodze (Czech Republic) K Vaňková | 4 | 5
2 | (Paraguay) V Cepede Royg (Liechtenstein) S Vogt | 6 | 7

Quarterfinals
1 | (Czech Republic) B Krejčíková (Czech Republic) R Voráčová | 2 | 6 | [6]
WC | (Slovakia) T Mihalíková (Slovakia) K Schmiedlová | 6 | 1 | [10]
4 | (Serbia) A Krunić (Croatia) P Martić | 4 | 6 | [10]
WC | (Hungary) D Gálfi (Russia) D Kasatkina | 6 | 3 | [1]
(Slovakia) J Čepelová (Slovakia) C Škamlová | 2 | 7 | [8]
3 | (Ukraine) Y Beygelzimer (Russia) M Gasparyan | 6 | 5 | [10]
WC | (Germany) A-L Friedsam (Slovakia) L Juríková | 6 | 6
2 | (Paraguay) V Cepede Royg (Liechtenstein) S Vogt | 2 | 3

Semifinals
WC | (Slovakia) T Mihalíková (Slovakia) K Schmiedlová | 2 | 6^{2}
4 | (Serbia) A Krunić (Croatia) P Martić | 6 | 7^{7}
3 | (Ukraine) Y Beygelzimer (Russia) M Gasparyan | 6 | 6
WC | (Germany) A-L Friedsam (Slovakia) L Juríková | 3 | 2

Final
4 | (Serbia) A Krunić (Croatia) P Martić | 3 | 2
3 | (Ukraine) Y Beygelzimer (Russia) M Gasparyan | 6 | 6
