= 2012 Empire Trnava Cup – Doubles =

Doubles
- 2012 Empire Trnava Cup

Final
- Champions: (Romania) Elena Bogdan (Czech Republic) Renata Voráčová
- Runners-up: (Poland) Marta Domachowska (Austria) Sandra Klemenschits
- Score: 7–6^{(7–2)}, 6–4

Events
| Singles | Doubles |
| ← 2011 · | Empire Trnava Cup | · 2013 → |

Janette Husárová and Renata Voráčová were the defending champions, but Husárová chose not to participate. Therefore, Voráčová partnered with Elena Bogdan and successfully defended her title defeating Marta Domachowska and Sandra Klemenschits in the final 7–6^{(7–2)}, 6–4.

== Seeds ==
1. (Romania) Elena Bogdan / (Czech Republic) Renata Voráčová (champions)
2. (Russia) Elena Bovina / (Russia) Valeria Savinykh (semifinals)
3. (Italy) Nicole Clerico / (Croatia) Ana Vrljić (quarterfinals)
4. (Poland) Marta Domachowska / (Austria) Sandra Klemenschits (final)

== Draw ==
=== Key ===
- Q = Qualifier
- WC = Wild card
- LL = Lucky loser
- Alt = Alternate
- SE = Special exempt
- PR = Protected ranking
- ITF = ITF entry
- JE = Junior exempt
- w/o = Walkover
- r = Retired
- d = Defaulted
- SR = Special ranking

=== Draw ===
First round
1 | (Romania) E Bogdan (Czech Republic) R Voráčová | 6 | 6
WC | (Ukraine) Y Beygelzimer (Latvia) L Gulbe | 1 | 2
(Czech Republic) N Fraňková (Hungary) R-L Jani | 6 | 6
(Turkey) H Esen (Turkey) L Esen | 3 | 3
3 | (Italy) N Clerico (Croatia) A Vrljić | 6 | 6
WC | (Germany) M Frlicka (Sweden) H Melander | 1 | 3
(Peru) B Botto (Switzerland) V Golubic | 6 | 6
(Slovakia) M Hončová (Slovakia) Z Luknárová | 3 | 1
(Czech Republic) M Borecká (Czech Republic) M Kubičíková | 3 | 6 | [10]
(Croatia) I Akiki (Slovakia) V Juhászová | 6 | 1 | [8]
(Romania) D Marcu (Romania) C Mitu | 4 | 1
4 | (Poland) M Domachowska (Austria) S Klemenschits | 6 | 6
(Russia) M Kondratieva (France) S Lefèvre | 6 | 2 | [10]
(Czech Republic) S Dobrá (Czech Republic) Lucie Kriegsmannová | 1 | 6 | [6]
WC | (Slovakia) L Butkovská (Slovakia) N Vajdová | 1 | 1
2 | (Russia) E Bovina (Russia) V Savinykh | 6 | 6

Quarterfinals
1 | (Romania) E Bogdan (Czech Republic) R Voráčová | 6 | 6
(Czech Republic) N Fraňková (Hungary) R-L Jani | 3 | 4
3 | (Italy) N Clerico (Croatia) A Vrljić | 3 | 6^{7}
(Peru) B Botto (Switzerland) V Golubic | 6 | 7^{9}
(Czech Republic) M Borecká (Czech Republic) M Kubičíková | 3 | 4
4 | (Poland) M Domachowska (Austria) S Klemenschits | 6 | 6
(Russia) M Kondratieva (France) S Lefèvre | 3 | 3
2 | (Russia) E Bovina (Russia) V Savinykh | 6 | 6

Semifinals
1 | (Romania) E Bogdan (Czech Republic) R Voráčová | 6 | 6
(Peru) B Botto (Switzerland) V Golubic | 1 | 0
4 | (Poland) M Domachowska (Austria) S Klemenschits | 6 | 4 | [10]
2 | (Russia) E Bovina (Russia) V Savinykh | 2 | 6 | [8]

Finals
1 | (Romania) E Bogdan (Czech Republic) R Voráčová | 7^{7} | 6
4 | (Poland) M Domachowska (Austria) S Klemenschits | 6^{2} | 4
