= 2013 Empire Slovak Open – Singles =

Singles
- 2013 Empire Slovak Open

Final
- Champion: (Czech Republic) Barbora Záhlavová-Strýcová
- Runner-up: (Italy) Karin Knapp
- Score: 6–2, 6–4

Events
Singles	Doubles
← 2012 ·	Empire Slovak Open	· 2014 →

Anastasija Sevastova was the defending champion, having won the event in 2012, but chose not to defend her title.

Barbora Záhlavová-Strýcová won the title, defeating Karin Knapp in the final, 6–2, 6–4.

== Seeds ==
1. (Slovakia) Jana Čepelová (first round)
2. (Italy) Karin Knapp (final)
3. (Serbia) Vesna Dolonc (second round)
4. (Hungary) Melinda Czink (first round)
5. (Czech Republic) Kristýna Plíšková (second round)
6. (United States) Alexa Glatch (first round)
7. (France) Stéphanie Foretz Gacon (first round)
8. (Greece) Eleni Daniilidou (second round; retired)

== Main draw ==
=== Key ===
- Q = Qualifier
- WC = Wild card
- LL = Lucky loser
- Alt = Alternate
- SE = Special exempt
- PR = Protected ranking
- ITF = ITF entry
- JE = Junior exempt
- w/o = Walkover
- r = Retired
- d = Defaulted
- SR = Special ranking

=== Finals ===
Semifinals
(Serbia) Aleksandra Krunić	6^{3}	2
(Czech Republic) Barbora Záhlavová-Strýcová	7^{7}	6
(Argentina) Paula Ormaechea	3	0
2	(Italy) Karin Knapp	6	6

Final
(Czech Republic) Barbora Záhlavová-Strýcová	6	6
2	(Italy) Karin Knapp	2	4

=== Top half ===
First round
1	(Slovakia) J Čepelová	4	3
(Serbia) A Krunić	6	6
WC	(Hungary) D Gálfi	7^{7}	3	5
(Russia) D Gavrilova	6^{4}	6	7
(Australia) O Rogowska	4	4
(Croatia) T Mrdeža	6	6
(Turkey) Ç Büyükakçay	6	3	5
8	(Greece) E Daniilidou	3	6	7
3	(Serbia) V Dolonc	6	6
LL	(Slovakia) V Juhászová	2	3
(Czech Republic) B Záhlavová-Strýcová	6	3	7^{7}
Q	(Poland) K Kawa	0	6	6^{4}
(Germany) D Pfizenmaier	6^{5}	3
WC	(Czech Republic) K Siniaková	7^{7}	6
WC	(Slovakia) N Vajdová	5	3
5	(Czech Republic) Kr Plíšková	7	6

Second round
(Serbia) A Krunić	7	7^{7}
(Russia) D Gavrilova	5	6^{3}
(Croatia) T Mrdeža	4	6	3
8	(Greece) E Daniilidou	6	3	1^{r}
3	(Serbia) V Dolonc	2	3
(Czech Republic) B Záhlavová-Strýcová	6	6
WC	(Czech Republic) K Siniaková	6^{5}	6	7^{8}
5	(Czech Republic) Kr Plíšková	7^{7}	3	6^{6}

Quarterfinals
(Serbia) A Krunić	6	6
(Croatia) T Mrdeža	4	4
(Czech Republic) B Záhlavová-Strýcová	6	6
WC	(Czech Republic) K Siniaková	2	2

Semifinals
(Serbia) A Krunić	6^{3}	2
(Czech Republic) B Záhlavová-Strýcová	7^{7}	6

=== Bottom half ===
First round
6	(United States) A Glatch	4	0
PR	(Croatia) A Tomljanović	6	6
WC	(Slovakia) P Uberalová	6^{6}	4
Q	(Slovakia) K Kučová	7^{8}	6
(Canada) S Dubois	4	6	6
Q	(Czech Republic) P Krejsová	6	4	3
(Argentina) P Ormaechea	1	6	6
4	(Hungary) M Czink	6	1	2
7	(France) S Foretz Gacon	2	1
(Slovakia) AK Schmiedlová	6	6
Q	(Czech Republic) R Voráčová	2	3
(Japan) K Nara	6	6
(Italy) N Burnett	6	6
(Czech Republic) E Birnerová	1	1
(Belgium) A Van Uytvanck	6^{4}	6^{5}
2	(Italy) K Knapp	7^{7}	7^{7}

Second round
PR	(Croatia) A Tomljanović	3	4
Q	(Slovakia) K Kučová	6	6
(Canada) S Dubois	4	2
(Argentina) P Ormaechea	6	6
(Slovakia) AK Schmiedlová	7^{7}	7^{7}
(Japan) K Nara	6^{5}	6^{5}
(Italy) N Burnett	1	2
2	(Italy) K Knapp	6	6

Quarterfinals
Q	(Slovakia) K Kučová	3	5
(Argentina) P Ormaechea	6	7
(Slovakia) AK Schmiedlová	1	4
2	(Italy) K Knapp	6	6

Semifinals
(Argentina) P Ormaechea	3	0
2	(Italy) K Knapp	6	6
