= 2012 Empire Trnava Cup =

- Date: 28 July – 5 August
- Edition: 4th
- Surface: Clay (outdoor)
- Location: Trnava, Slovakia

Champions

Singles
- (Latvia) Anastasija Sevastova

Doubles
- (Romania) Elena Bogdan / (Czech Republic) Renata Voráčová
← 2011 ·	Empire Trnava Cup	· 2013 →

The 2012 Empire Trnava Cup was a professional tennis tournament played on outdoor clay courts. It was the fourth edition of the tournament which was part of the 2012 ITF Women's Circuit. It took place in Trnava, Slovakia, on 28 July – 5 August 2012.

== WTA entrants ==
=== Seeds ===
Country	Player	Rank^{1}	Seed
GER	Dinah Pfizenmaier	128	1
RUS	Valeria Savinykh	133	2
ITA	Nastassja Burnett	137	3
AUT	Yvonne Meusburger	139	4
UKR	Yuliya Beygelzimer	160	5
NED	Bibiane Schoofs	161	6
LAT	Anastasija Sevastova	166	7
BUL	Elitsa Kostova	167	8

- ^{1} Rankings as of 23 July 2012

=== Other entrants ===
The following players received wildcards into the singles main draw:

- (Germany) Michaela Frlicka
- (Latvia) Laura Gulbe
- (Czech Republic) Gabriela Pantůčková
- (Slovakia) Nikola Vajdová

The following players received entry from the qualifying draw:

- (Czech Republic) Martina Borecká
- (Austria) Iris Khanna
- (Sweden) Hilda Melander
- (Croatia) Ana Savić

== Champions ==
=== Singles ===
- (Latvia) Anastasija Sevastova def. (Croatia) Ana Savić (walkover)

=== Doubles ===
- (Romania) Elena Bogdan / (Czech Republic) Renata Voráčová def. (Poland) Marta Domachowska / (Austria) Sandra Klemenschits 7–6^{(7–2)}, 6–4
