= 2016 Empire Slovak Open – Doubles =

Doubles
- 2016 Empire Slovak Open

Final
- Champions: (Russia) Anna Kalinskaya (Slovakia) Tereza Mihalíková
- Runners-up: (Russia) Evgeniya Rodina (Latvia) Anastasija Sevastova
- Score: 6–1, 7–6^{(7–4)}

Events
| Singles | Doubles |
| ← 2015 · | Empire Slovak Open | · 2017 → |

Yuliya Beygelzimer and Margarita Gasparyan were the defending champions, but Gasparyan chose to participate in Rome instead. Beygelzimer partnered Misa Eguchi, but lost in the first round.

Anna Kalinskaya and Tereza Mihalíková won the title, defeating Evgeniya Rodina and Anastasija Sevastova in the final, 6–1, 7–6^{(7–4)}.

== Seeds ==
1. (Germany) Carolin Daniels / (Belarus) Lidziya Marozava (first round)
2. (Czech Republic) Lenka Kunčíková / (Czech Republic) Karolína Stuchlá (semifinals)
3. (Russia) Evgeniya Rodina / (Latvia) Anastasija Sevastova (final)
4. (France) Irina Ramialison / (France) Constance Sibille (first round)

== Draw ==
=== Key ===
- Q = Qualifier
- WC = Wild card
- LL = Lucky loser
- Alt = Alternate
- SE = Special exempt
- PR = Protected ranking
- ITF = ITF entry
- JE = Junior exempt
- w/o = Walkover
- r = Retired
- d = Defaulted
- SR = Special ranking

First round
1 | (Germany) C Daniels (Belarus) L Marozava | 4 | 0
(Hungary) Á Bukta (Slovakia) L Juríková | 6 | 6
WC | (Slovakia) V Juhászová (Austria) S Klemenschits | 0 | 3
(Russia) A Blinkova (Slovakia) R Šramková | 6 | 6
3 | (Russia) E Rodina (Latvia) A Sevastova | 4 | 6 | [10]
(Ukraine) Y Beygelzimer (Japan) M Eguchi | 6 | 2 | [7]
(Netherlands) R Husak (Turkey) D Yurtkuran | 3 | 0
(Czech Republic) S Machalová (Czech Republic) D Šumová | 6 | 6
(Russia) P Leykina (Czech Republic) B Štefková | 3 | 6 | [8]
(Romania) N Dascălu (Bulgaria) V Tomova | 6 | 4 | [10]
(Russia) A Kalinskaya (Slovakia) T Mihalíková | 7 | 6
4 | (France) I Ramialison (France) C Sibille | 5 | 2
(Slovakia) J Čepelová (Slovakia) M Rybáriková | 6 | 6
(Slovakia) M Hončová (Slovakia) V Kužmová | 3 | 4
(Russia) A Golubeva (Slovakia) S Jamrichová | 0 | 3
2 | (Czech Republic) L Kunčíková (Czech Republic) K Stuchlá | 6 | 6

Quarterfinals
(Hungary) Á Bukta (Slovakia) L Juríková | 1 | 2
(Russia) A Blinkova (Slovakia) R Šramková | 6 | 6
3 | (Russia) E Rodina (Latvia) A Sevastova | 4 | 6 | [10]
(Czech Republic) S Machalová (Czech Republic) D Šumová | 6 | 2 | [7]
(Romania) N Dascălu (Bulgaria) V Tomova | 6 | 4 | [4]
(Russia) A Kalinskaya (Slovakia) T Mihalíková | 3 | 6 | [10]
(Slovakia) J Čepelová (Slovakia) M Rybáriková
2 | (Czech Republic) L Kunčíková (Czech Republic) K Stuchlá | w/o

Semifinals
(Russia) A Blinkova (Slovakia) R Šramková | 6 | 3 | [7]
3 | (Russia) E Rodina (Latvia) A Sevastova | 2 | 6 | [10]
(Russia) A Kalinskaya (Slovakia) T Mihalíková | 6 | 6
2 | (Czech Republic) L Kunčíková (Czech Republic) K Stuchlá | 4 | 2

Final
3 | (Russia) E Rodina (Latvia) A Sevastova | 1 | 6^{4}
(Russia) A Kalinskaya (Slovakia) T Mihalíková | 6 | 7^{7}
