= 2014 Empire Slovak Open – Doubles =

Doubles
- 2014 Empire Slovak Open

Final
- Champions: (Liechtenstein) Stephanie Vogt (China) Zheng Saisai
- Runners-up: (Russia) Margarita Gasparyan (Russia) Evgeniya Rodina
- Score: 6–4, 6–2

Events
Singles	Doubles
← 2013 ·	Empire Slovak Open	· 2015 →

Mervana Jugić-Salkić and Renata Voráčová were the defending champions, having won the event in 2013, however Jugić-Salkić retired from professional tennis earlier in 2014. Voráčová partnered with Yuliya Beygelzimer as the first seeds, but lost in the semifinals.

Stephanie Vogt and Zheng Saisai won the title, defeating Margarita Gasparyan and Evgeniya Rodina in the final, 6–4, 6–2.

== Seeds ==
1. (Ukraine) Yuliya Beygelzimer / (Czech Republic) Renata Voráčová (semifinals)
2. (Liechtenstein) Stephanie Vogt / (China) Zheng Saisai (champions)
3. (Romania) Raluca Olaru / (Australia) Olivia Rogowska (first round)
4. (Serbia) Vesna Dolonc / (Serbia) Aleksandra Krunić (quarterfinals)

== Draw ==
=== Key ===
- Q = Qualifier
- WC = Wild card
- LL = Lucky loser
- Alt = Alternate
- SE = Special exempt
- PR = Protected ranking
- ITF = ITF entry
- JE = Junior exempt
- w/o = Walkover
- r = Retired
- d = Defaulted
- SR = Special ranking

First round
1	(Ukraine) Y Beygelzimer (Czech Republic) R Voráčová	3
(Czech Republic) D Allertová (Czech Republic) P Krejsová	0^{r}
WC	(Slovakia) AK Schmiedlová (Slovakia) P Uberalová	4	4
(Hungary) R-L Jani (Ukraine) V Kapshay	6	6
3	(Romania) R Olaru (Australia) O Rogowska	6	6^{6}	[4]
(Russia) M Gasparyan (Russia) E Rodina	4	7^{8}	[10]
WC	(Slovakia) V Kužmová (Slovakia) K Schmiedlová	3	4
(Germany) A-L Friedsam (Slovenia) T Majerič	6	6
(Turkey) Ç Büyükakçay (Ukraine) A Vasylyeva	4	3
(Montenegro) D Kovinić (Belarus) A Sasnovich	6	6
(Switzerland) V Golubic (Ukraine) V Ivakhnenko	2	3
4	(Serbia) V Dolonc (Serbia) A Krunić	6	6
(Czech Republic) N Fraňková (Czech Republic) K Siniaková	6	5	[12]
(Slovakia) V Juhászová (Czech Republic) B Krejčíková	2	7	[10]
WC	(Slovakia) L Juríková (Slovakia) K Morgošová	5	0
2	(Liechtenstein) S Vogt (China) S Zheng	7	6

Quarterfinals
1	(Ukraine) Y Beygelzimer (Czech Republic) R Voráčová	6	4	[10]
(Hungary) R-L Jani (Ukraine) V Kapshay	2	6	[7]
(Russia) M Gasparyan (Russia) E Rodina	7	6
(Germany) A-L Friedsam (Slovenia) T Majerič	5	3
(Montenegro) D Kovinić (Belarus) A Sasnovich	6	7
4	(Serbia) V Dolonc (Serbia) A Krunić	4	5
(Czech Republic) N Fraňková (Czech Republic) K Siniaková	7	0	[9]
2	(Liechtenstein) S Vogt (China) S Zheng	5	6	[11]

Semifinals
1	(Ukraine) Y Beygelzimer (Czech Republic) R Voráčová	4	2
(Russia) M Gasparyan (Russia) E Rodina	6	6
(Montenegro) D Kovinić (Belarus) A Sasnovich	2	5
2	(Liechtenstein) S Vogt (China) S Zheng	6	7

Final
(Russia) M Gasparyan (Russia) E Rodina	4	2
2	(Liechtenstein) S Vogt (China) S Zheng	6	6
