= 2014 Empire Slovak Open – Singles =

Singles
- 2014 Empire Slovak Open

Final
- Champion: (Slovakia) Anna Karolína Schmiedlová
- Runner-up: (Czech Republic) Barbora Záhlavová-Strýcová
- Score: 6–4, 6–2

Events
| Singles | Doubles |
| ← 2013 · | Empire Slovak Open | · 2015 → |

Barbora Záhlavová-Strýcová was the defending champion, but lost to Anna Karolína Schmiedlová in the final, 6–4, 6–2.

== Seeds ==
1. (Czech Republic) Barbora Záhlavová-Strýcová (final)
2. (Slovakia) Anna Karolína Schmiedlová (champion)
3. (Israel) Julia Glushko (first round)
4. (Croatia) Petra Martić (second round)
5. (Germany) Anna-Lena Friedsam (second round)
6. (Serbia) Jovana Jakšić (first round)
7. (Czech Republic) ~~Andrea Hlaváčková~~ (withdrew)
8. (Serbia) Vesna Dolonc (first round)

== Main draw ==
=== Key ===
- Q = Qualifier
- WC = Wild card
- LL = Lucky loser
- Alt = Alternate
- SE = Special exempt
- PR = Protected ranking
- ITF = ITF entry
- JE = Junior exempt
- w/o = Walkover
- r = Retired
- d = Defaulted
- SR = Special ranking

=== Finals ===
Semifinals
1 | (Czech Republic) Barbora Záhlavová-Strýcová | 4 | 6 | 6
(Serbia) Aleksandra Krunić | 6 | 2 | 3
(Ukraine) Lesia Tsurenko | 6^{1} | 6^{5}
2 | (Slovakia) Anna Karolína Schmiedlová | 7^{7} | 7^{7}

Final
1 | (Czech Republic) Barbora Záhlavová-Strýcová | 4 | 2
2 | (Slovakia) Anna Karolína Schmiedlová | 6 | 6

=== Top half ===
First round
1 | (Czech Republic) B Záhlavová-Strýcová | 4 | 6 | 7
(Turkey) Ç Büyükakçay | 6 | 4 | 5
(Czech Republic) L Hradecká | 6 | 6
WC | (Hungary) D Gálfi | 2 | 3
(United States) M Brengle | 6 | 7
(Switzerland) V Golubic | 3 | 5
Q | (Romania) A Mitu | 7^{7} | 5 | 7^{7}
LL | (Czech Republic) B Krejčíková | 6^{4} | 7 | 6^{5}
3 | (Israel) J Glushko | 6^{3} | 1
(Slovenia) T Majerič | 7^{7} | 6
(Australia) O Rogowska | 6 | 6
WC | (Slovakia) K Schmiedlová | 4 | 0
Q | (Czech Republic) D Allertová | 6 | 6
WC | (Slovakia) V Kužmová | 1 | 1
(Serbia) A Krunić | 6 | 6
8 | (Serbia) V Dolonc | 3 | 3

Second round
1 | (Czech Republic) B Záhlavová-Strýcová | 6 | 3 | 6
(Czech Republic) L Hradecká | 3 | 6 | 0
(United States) M Brengle | 3 | 6 | 6
Q | (Romania) A Mitu | 6 | 2 | 2
(Slovenia) T Majerič | 3 | 2
(Australia) O Rogowska | 6 | 6
Q | (Czech Republic) D Allertová
(Serbia) A Krunić | w/o

Quarterfinals
1 | (Czech Republic) B Záhlavová-Strýcová | 7^{7} | 7^{7}
(United States) M Brengle | 6^{4} | 6^{3}
(Australia) O Rogowska | 2 | 1
(Serbia) A Krunić | 6 | 6

Semifinals
1 | (Czech Republic) B Záhlavová-Strýcová | 4 | 6 | 6
(Serbia) A Krunić | 6 | 2 | 3

=== Bottom half ===
First round
6 | (Serbia) J Jakšić | 6 | 4 | 5
(Ukraine) L Tsurenko | 2 | 6 | 7
(China) S Zheng | 6 | 6
(Slovakia) K Kučová | 2 | 1
(Montenegro) D Kovinić | 6 | 6
WC | (Czech Republic) T Smitková | 2 | 4
(Belarus) A Sasnovich | 1 | 5
4 | (Croatia) P Martić | 6 | 7
5 | (Germany) A-L Friedsam | 6 | 6
(Czech Republic) E Birnerová | 2 | 1
(Liechtenstein) S Vogt | 6 | 4 | 5
(Czech Republic) K Siniaková | 4 | 6 | 7
PR | (Russia) E Rodina | 4 | 7^{7} | 3
Q | (Russia) M Gasparyan | 6 | 6^{4} | 6
Q | (Czech Republic) R Voráčová | 6 | 5 | 0
2 | (Slovakia) AK Schmiedlová | 2 | 7 | 6

Second round
(Ukraine) L Tsurenko | 6 | 6
(China) S Zheng | 3 | 3
(Montenegro) D Kovinić | 6 | 6
4 | (Croatia) P Martić | 3 | 2
5 | (Germany) A-L Friedsam | 3 | 6 | 2
(Czech Republic) K Siniaková | 6 | 2 | 6
Q | (Russia) M Gasparyan | 5 | 3
2 | (Slovakia) AK Schmiedlová | 7 | 6

Quarterfinals
(Ukraine) L Tsurenko | 2 | 7^{7} | 6
(Montenegro) D Kovinić | 6 | 6^{2} | 3
(Czech Republic) K Siniaková | 3 | 1
2 | (Slovakia) AK Schmiedlová | 6 | 6

Semifinals
(Ukraine) L Tsurenko | 6^{1} | 6^{5}
2 | (Slovakia) AK Schmiedlová | 7^{7} | 7^{7}
