= 2011 Empire Trnava Cup – Doubles =

Doubles
- 2011 Empire Trnava Cup

Final
- Champions: (Slovakia) Janette Husárová (Czech Republic) Renata Voráčová
- Runners-up: (Slovakia) Jana Čepelová (Slovakia) Lenka Wienerová
- Score: 7–6^{(7–2)}, 6–1

Events
Singles	Doubles
← 2010 ·	Empire Trnava Cup	· 2012 →

Iveta Gerlová and Lucie Kriegsmannová were the defending champions, but both players chose not to participate.

Janette Husárová and Renata Voráčová won the tournament by defeating Jana Čepelová and Lenka Wienerová in the final, 7–6^{(7–2)}, 6–1.

== Seeds ==
1. (Poland) Magda Linette / (Poland) Barbara Sobaszkiewicz (quarterfinals)
2. (Slovakia) Jana Čepelová / (Slovakia) Lenka Wienerová (final)
3. (Poland) Paula Kania / (Poland) Katarzyna Kawa (quarterfinals)
4. (Romania) Camelia Hristea / (Czech Republic) Martina Kubičíková (semifinals)

== Draw ==
=== Key ===
- Q = Qualifier
- WC = Wild card
- LL = Lucky loser
- Alt = Alternate
- SE = Special exempt
- PR = Protected ranking
- ITF = ITF entry
- JE = Junior exempt
- w/o = Walkover
- r = Retired
- d = Defaulted
- SR = Special ranking

First round
(Ukraine) L Kichenok (Serbia) A Krunić	6	6
(Slovakia) R Tabak (Japan) C Takayama	3	4
(Slovakia) L Juríková (Slovakia) K Kučová	1	4
(Slovakia) J Husárová (Czech Republic) R Voráčová	6	6
(Slovakia) Na Vajdová (Slovakia) Ni Vajdová	3	3
(Slovakia) M Hončová (Slovakia) K Morgošová	6	6
(Germany) M Frlicka (Czech Republic) V Kolářová	w/o
(Switzerland) V Golubic (Bosnia and Herzegovina) J Tinjić

Quarterfinals
1	(Poland) M Linette (Poland) B Sobaszkiewicz	2	2
(Ukraine) L Kichenok (Serbia) A Krunić	6	6
3	(Poland) P Kania (Poland) K Kawa	6	5	[8]
(Slovakia) J Husárová (Czech Republic) R Voráčová	1	7	[10]
(Slovakia) M Hončová (Slovakia) K Morgošová	3	7^{7}	[9]
4	(Romania) C Hristea (Czech Republic) M Kubičíková	6	6^{5}	[11]
(Germany) M Frlicka (Czech Republic) V Kolářová	0	4
2	(Slovakia) J Čepelová (Slovakia) L Wienerová	6	6

Semifinals
(Ukraine) L Kichenok (Serbia) A Krunić	6	4	[2]
(Slovakia) J Husárová (Czech Republic) R Voráčová	2	6	[10]
4	(Romania) C Hristea (Czech Republic) M Kubičíková	3	1
2	(Slovakia) J Čepelová (Slovakia) L Wienerová	6	6

Final
(Slovakia) J Husárová (Czech Republic) R Voráčová	7^{7}	6
2	(Slovakia) J Čepelová (Slovakia) L Wienerová	6^{2}	1
