= 2013 Empire Slovak Open – Doubles =

Doubles
- 2013 Empire Slovak Open

Final
- Champions: (Bosnia and Herzegovina) Mervana Jugić-Salkić (Czech Republic) Renata Voráčová
- Runners-up: (Slovakia) Jana Čepelová (Slovakia) Anna Karolína Schmiedlová
- Score: 6–1, 6–1

Events
Singles	Doubles
← 2012 ·	Empire Slovak Open	· 2014 →

Elena Bogdan and Renata Voráčová were the defending champions, having won the event in 2012. In 2013, both players decided to defend their titles, but with different partners. Bogdan paired up with Jill Craybas but they lost in the quarterfinals while Voráčová paired up with Mervana Jugić-Salkić.

Jugić-Salkić and Voráčová won the title, defeating Jana Čepelová and Anna Karolína Schmiedlová in the final, 6–1, 6–1.

== Seeds ==
1. (Bosnia and Herzegovina) Mervana Jugić-Salkić / (Czech Republic) Renata Voráčová (champions)
2. (Czech Republic) Eva Birnerová / (Czech Republic) Kristýna Plíšková (first round)
3. (Serbia) Vesna Dolonc / (France) Stéphanie Foretz Gacon (semifinals)
4. (Romania) Elena Bogdan / (United States) Jill Craybas (quarterfinals)

== Draw ==
=== Key ===
- Q = Qualifier
- WC = Wild card
- LL = Lucky loser
- Alt = Alternate
- SE = Special exempt
- PR = Protected ranking
- ITF = ITF entry
- JE = Junior exempt
- w/o = Walkover
- r = Retired
- d = Defaulted
- SR = Special ranking

First round
1	(Bosnia and Herzegovina) M Jugić-Salkić (Czech Republic) R Voráčová	6	6
(Italy) N Clerico (Switzerland) C Perrin	1	3
(Ukraine) V Ivakhnenko (Ukraine) K Kozlova	6	7
(Hungary) M Czink (Hungary) R-L Jani	2	5
3	(Serbia) V Dolonc (France) S Foretz Gacon	1	7	[10]
(Canada) S Dubois (Australia) O Rogowska	6	5	[3]
WC	(Slovakia) P Uberalová (Slovakia) N Vajdová	5	4
(Canada) G Dabrowski (Russia) A Kudryavtseva	7	6
WC	(Hungary) D Gálfi (Slovakia) B Kötelesová	6^{1}	2
(Slovakia) J Čepelová (Slovakia) AK Schmiedlová	7^{7}	6
WC	(Slovakia) M Hončová (Slovakia) L Juríková	6	4	[2]
4	(Romania) E Bogdan (United States) J Craybas	3	6	[10]
(Greece) E Daniilidou (Italy) K Knapp	5	7	[10]
(Ukraine) Y Beygelzimer (Turkey) Ç Büyükakçay	7	5	[6]
(United States) A Glatch (Argentina) P Ormaechea	6	6
2	(Czech Republic) E Birnerová (Czech Republic) Kr Plíšková	2	1

Quarterfinals
1	(Bosnia and Herzegovina) M Jugić-Salkić (Czech Republic) R Voráčová	7	3	[10]
(Ukraine) V Ivakhnenko (Ukraine) K Kozlova	5	6	[8]
3	(Serbia) V Dolonc (France) S Foretz Gacon	4	6	[10]
(Canada) G Dabrowski (Russia) A Kudryavtseva	6	3	[6]
(Slovakia) J Čepelová (Slovakia) AK Schmiedlová	6	6
4	(Romania) E Bogdan (United States) J Craybas	1	1
(Greece) E Daniilidou (Italy) K Knapp
(United States) A Glatch (Argentina) P Ormaechea	w/o

Semifinals
1	(Bosnia and Herzegovina) M Jugić-Salkić (Czech Republic) R Voráčová	6	6^{3}	[11]
3	(Serbia) V Dolonc (France) S Foretz Gacon	4	7^{7}	[9]
(Slovakia) J Čepelová (Slovakia) AK Schmiedlová	4	6	[10]
(United States) A Glatch (Argentina) P Ormaechea	6	2	[8]

Final
1	(Bosnia and Herzegovina) M Jugić-Salkić (Czech Republic) R Voráčová	6	6
(Slovakia) J Čepelová (Slovakia) AK Schmiedlová	1	1
