= 2015 Empire Slovak Open =

- Date: 4–10 May
- Edition: 7th
- Category: ITF Women's Circuit
- Prize money: $100,000
- Surface: Clay
- Location: Trnava, Slovakia

Champions

Singles
- (Montenegro) Danka Kovinić

Doubles
- (Ukraine) Yuliya Beygelzimer / (Russia) Margarita Gasparyan
- Empire Slovak Open

The 2015 Empire Slovak Open was a professional tennis tournament played on outdoor clay courts. It was the seventh edition of the tournament and part of the 2015 ITF Women's Circuit, offering a total of $100,000 in prize money. It took place in Trnava, Slovakia, on 4–10 May 2015.

== Singles main draw entrants ==
=== Seeds ===
Country	Player	Rank^{1}	Seed
CZE	Tereza Smitková	65	1
SRB	Aleksandra Krunić	77	2
CZE	Klára Koukalová	84	3
HUN	Tímea Babos	86	4
RUS	Evgeniya Rodina	90	5
BEL	Yanina Wickmayer	92	6
CHN	Zhang Shuai	98	7
GER	Anna-Lena Friedsam	102	8

- ^{1} Rankings as of 27 April 2015

=== Other entrants ===
The following players received wildcards into the singles main draw:

- (Ukraine) Anhelina Kalinina
- (Slovakia) Tereza Mihalíková
- (Slovakia) Kristína Schmiedlová
- (Slovakia) Natália Vajdová

The following players received entry from the qualifying draw:

- (Croatia) Jana Fett
- (Slovakia) Lenka Juríková
- (Croatia) Adrijana Lekaj
- (Slovakia) Rebecca Šramková

The following player received entry from a protected ranking:

- (Russia) Victoria Kan

== Champions ==
=== Singles ===
- (Montenegro) Danka Kovinić def. (Russia) Margarita Gasparyan, 7–5, 6–3

=== Doubles ===
- (Ukraine) Yuliya Beygelzimer / (Russia) Margarita Gasparyan def. (Serbia) Aleksandra Krunić / (Croatia) Petra Martić, 6–3, 6–2
