= Anna Karolína Schmiedlová =

Slovak tennis player (born 1994)

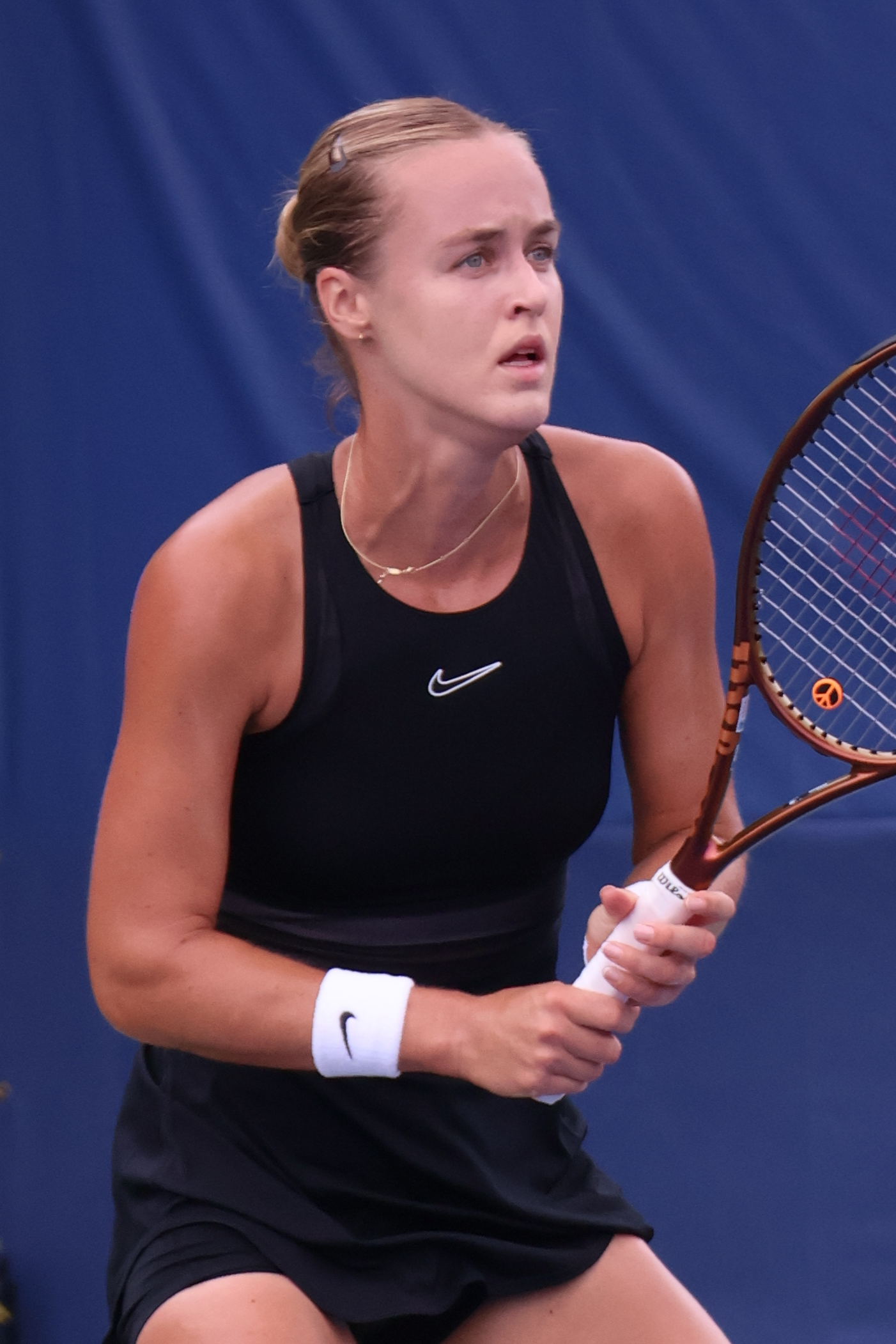
- Schmiedlová at the 2023 US Open
- Country (sports): Slovakia
- Born: 13 September 1994 (age 32) Košice, Slovakia
- Height: 1.76 m (5 ft 9 in)
- Turned pro: 2011
- Plays: Right-handed (two-handed backhand)
- Coach: Laco Simon
- Prize money: US$ 4,816,799

Singles
- Career record: 432–316
- Career titles: 3
- Highest ranking: No. 26 (12 October 2015)

Grand Slam singles results
- Australian Open: 2R (2014, 2015, 2021, 2023)
- French Open: 4R (2023)
- Wimbledon: 2R (2022)
- US Open: 3R (2015, 2023)

Other tournaments
- Olympic Games: SF - 4th (2024)

Doubles
- Career record: 39–65
- Career titles: 0
- Highest ranking: No. 213 (15 June 2015)

Grand Slam doubles results
- Australian Open: 1R (2015, 2016, 2022, 2024)
- French Open: 2R (2015)
- Wimbledon: 1R (2014, 2016, 2023)
- US Open: 2R (2014)

Team competitions
- Fed Cup: F (2024), record 13–14

Anna Karolína Schmiedlová (Slovak pronunciation: [ˈanna ˈkarɔliːna ˈʂmiːdlɔʋaː]; born 13 September 1994) is a Slovak inactive tennis player. On 12 October 2015, she reached her best singles ranking of world No. 26. She has won three singles titles on the WTA Tour, two singles titles on the WTA Challenger Tour as well as 12 singles titles on the ITF Circuit.

== Early life ==
Schmiedlová was born in Košice to father Juraj and mother Martina. Her father played hockey for HC Košice, while her mother was a Czechoslovak national champion in water skiing. Her younger sister, Kristína Schmiedlová, was also a tennis player, but ended her career at the age of 21 to study medicine.

== Career ==
=== 2013: Major and top 100 debuts ===
Schmiedlová qualified for her first Grand Slam tournament at the French Open. After Wimbledon, she reached the final of the $100k Open de Biarritz, and lost to Stephanie Vogt, in three sets.

She reached the top 100 for the first time with a ranking of world No. 97.

=== 2014: French Open third round ===
In May, Schmiedlová won the Empire Slovak Open in Trnava when she defeated defending champion Barbora Záhlavová-Strýcová in the final. The following week, she reached the final of the Prague Open, losing to Heather Watson in straight sets.

At the French Open, Schmiedlová defeated Zheng Jie in the first round and surprised former world No. 1, Venus Williams, with a victory in three sets in round two. In the third round, she lost in straight sets to Garbiñe Muguruza.

=== 2015: Breakthrough and first WTA Tour title ===
In February, she reached her first WTA Tour final at the Rio Open, losing to Sara Errani in straight sets. In April, she won her first WTA career title at the Katowice Open, where she defeated Camila Giorgi in the final. She won her second career title at the Bucharest Open, where she this time defeated Errani in the final.

At the Wuhan Open, Schmiedlová scored her first top-10 victory, and hence the biggest win of her career, by upsetting former world No. 1, Caroline Wozniacki, in three sets in the second round.

=== 2016: Loss of form, out of top 100 ===
Schmiedlová commenced season at the Brisbane International and lost in the first round to Varvara Lepchenko. Schmiedlová won her first match of the season at the Sydney International beating sixth seed Timea Bacsinszky in the first round. She was heavily defeated in the second round by qualifier Monica Puig. Seeded 27th at the Australian Open, Schmiedlová lost in round one to Daria Kasatkina.

=== 2018–2019: Third career title ===
Ranked No. 132 in the world, Schmiedlová won her third career title at the Copa Colsanitas in Bogotá, Colombia, where she beat Lara Arruabarrena in the final. It was her first title since 2015 and resulted in her return to the top 100.

=== 2020: First third-round appearance at the French Open in six years ===
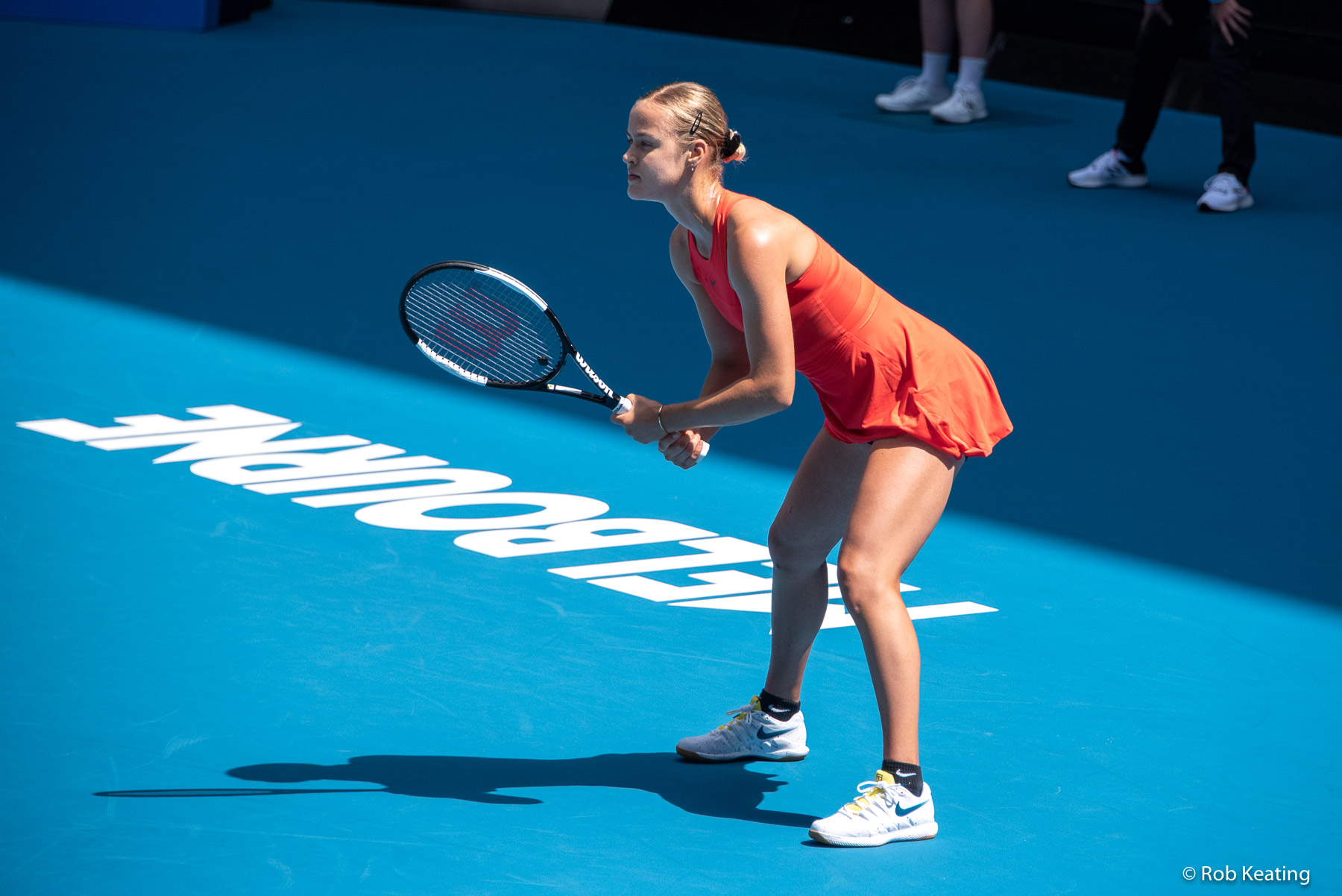
Schmiedlová at the 2020 Australian Open

Schmiedlová kicked off her season at the Brisbane International where she lost to Marta Kostyuk in the second round of qualifying. At Hobart, she was defeated in the first round of qualifying by Nina Stojanović. At the Australian Open, she lost her first-round match to sixth seed Belinda Bencic.

Playing in the Fed Cup tie versus Great Britain, Schmiedlová helped Slovakia win 3–1 by beating Heather Watson and Harriet Dart. Playing at the Mexican Open, Schmiedlová was defeated in the first round by Anastasia Potapova. Coming through qualifying at the Monterrey Open, Schmiedlová beat Venus Williams in the first round. She then lost in the second round to ninth seed and eventual finalist, Marie Bouzková. A week later, competing at a $25k tournament in Irapuato, Mexico she was defeated in the first round by eighth seed Renata Zarazúa.

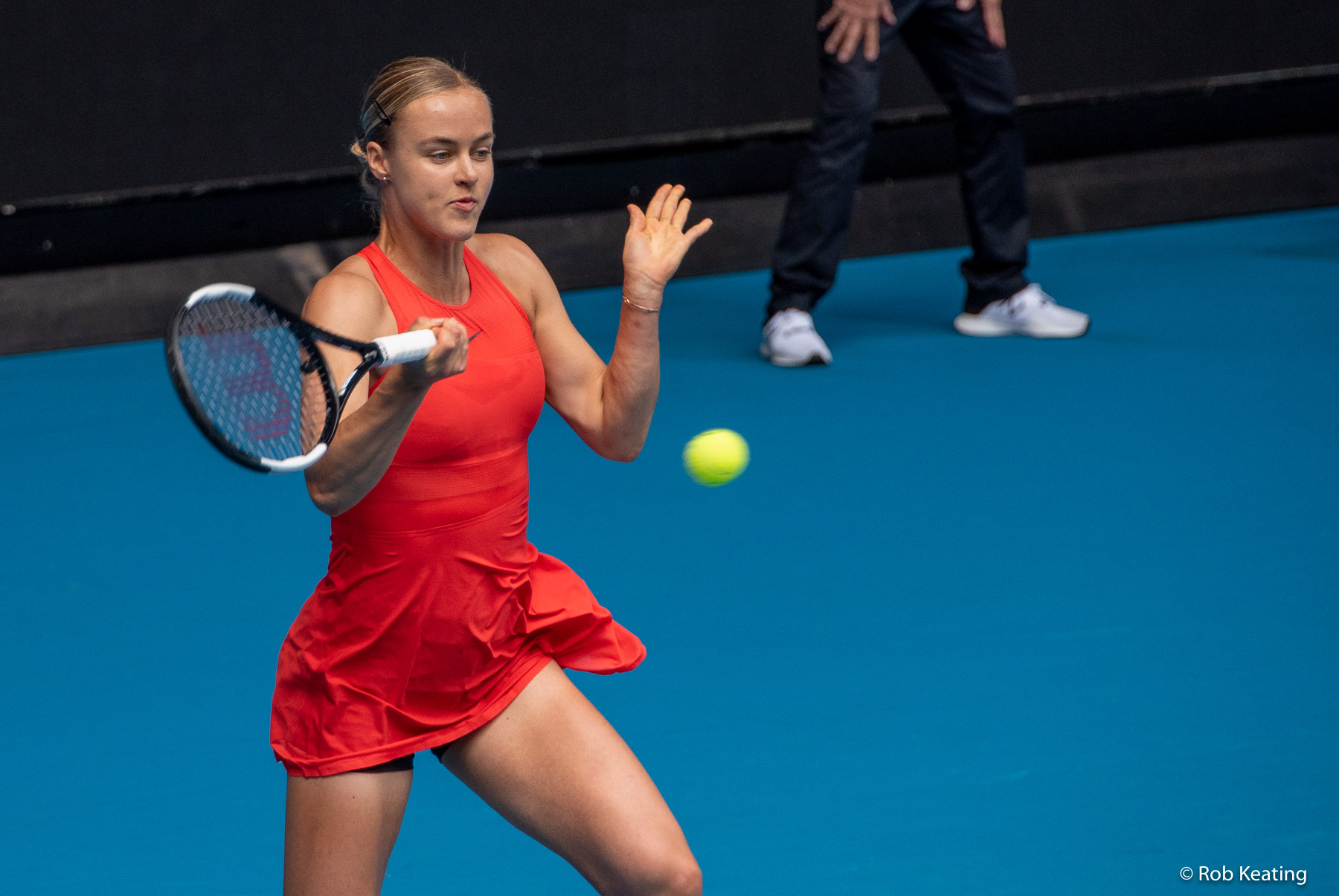
Schmiedlová at the 2020 Australian Open

In August, Schmiedlová competed at the Sparta Prague Open. Seeded 24th, she reached the quarterfinals where she lost to second seed and eventual finalist, Elisabetta Cocciaretto. In the leadup to the French Open, Schmiedlová played the İstanbul Cup and made it to the second round before she was defeated in three sets by Aliaksandra Sasnovich.

At the French Open, Schmiedlová beat 2002 finalist and former world No. 1, Venus Williams, in straight sets in the first round. She then upset tenth seed and former world No. 1, Victoria Azarenka, to reach the third round for the first time since 2014. But her run ended there with a straight-sets loss to qualifier and eventual semifinalist, Nadia Podoroska.

=== 2023: French Open fourth round ===
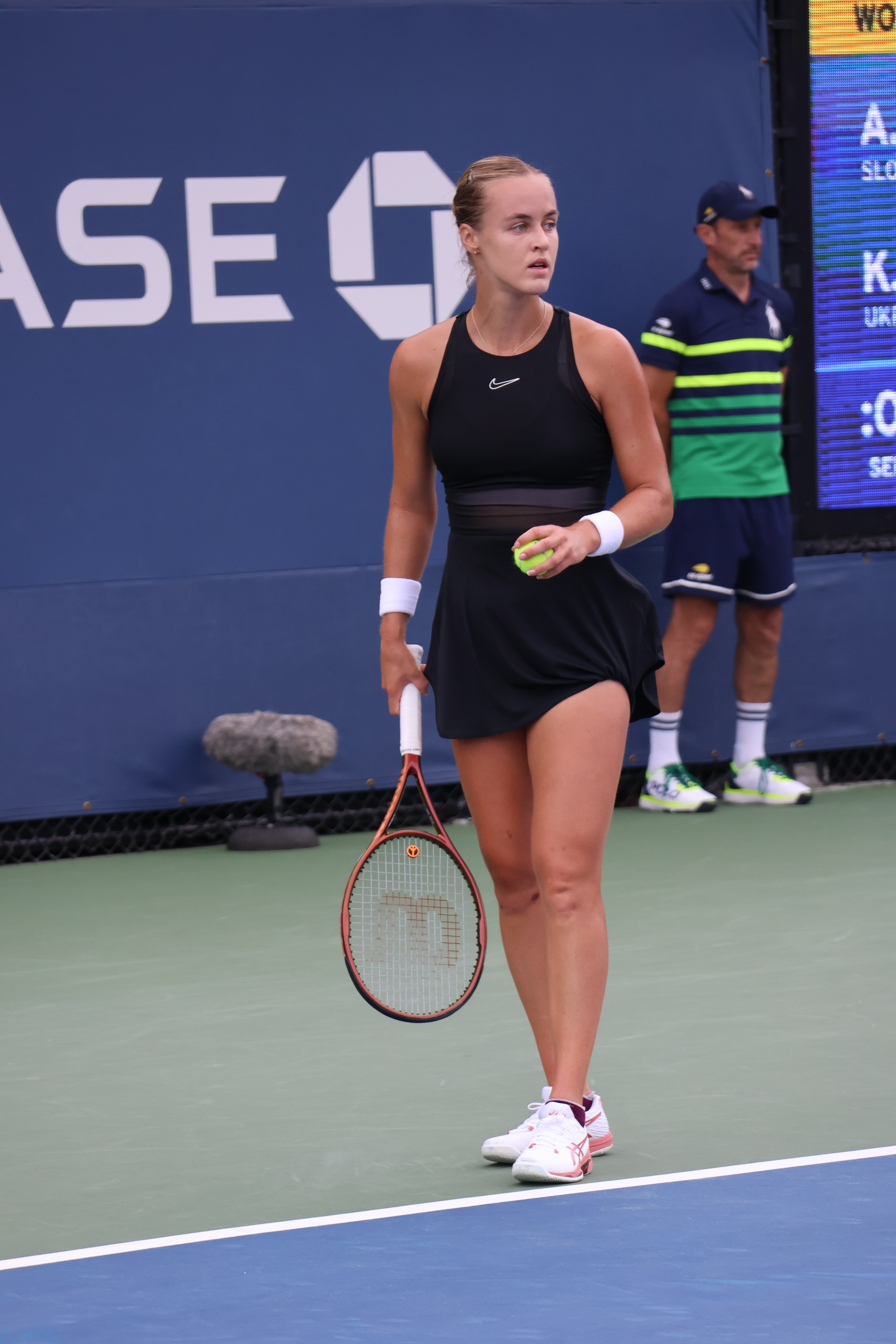
Schmiedlová at the 2023 US Open

Ranked No. 100, she reached the fourth round of the French Open for the first time at a major event in her career, defeating 11th seed Veronika Kudermetova, lucky loser Aliona Bolsova, and qualifier Kayla Day. Schmiedlová was the first Slovak to reach the second week at a major since Magdaléna Rybáriková at the 2018 Australian Open, and the first to do so at Roland Garros since Dominika Cibulková's 2012 quarterfinal run. In the fourth round, however, she lost to Coco Gauff.

In September, Schmiedlová reached the final of the WTA 125 tournament in Parma and lost to Ana Bogdan.

=== 2024: Olympics fourth place ===
At the Australian Open, Schmiedlová lost to Coco Gauff in the first round. In Austin, she was beaten in her semifinal match by the eventual winner, Yuan Yue.

In May, Schmiedlová won the WTA 125 tournament in Parma, defeating Mayar Sherif in the final. At the French Open, she lost in the first round to qualifier Sara Errani.

At the Budapest Grand Prix in July, Schmiedlová made the semifinals with successive deciding set wins over Kamilla Rakhimova, fourth seed Sara Sorribes Tormo, and Elina Avanesyan, before losing to Aliaksandra Sasnovich with the match again going to three sets.

On her second appearance at the Summer Olympics, she reached the semifinals in Paris defeating Katie Boulter, 14th seed Beatriz Haddad Maia and fourth seed Jasmine Paolini and world No. 10 and reigning Wimbledon champion, Barbora Krejčíková. She was the first Slovak woman to reach the medal stage at the Games. but lost in the semifinal to Donna Vekić and the bronze medal match to Iga Świątek.

As the top seed at the Guadalajara 125 Open, Schmiedlová beat wildcard Julia García Ruiz, qualifier Kimberly Birrell, and sixth seed Emina Bektas, before losing to fourth seeded Tatjana Maria.

== Personal life ==
Schmiedlová is in a relationship with fellow professional tennis player Lukáš Klein and in May 2025 the couple announced she was pregnant with their first child. Schmiedlová married Klein on 2 August 2025.

== Performance timelines ==
Key
W	F	SF	QF	#R	RR	Q#	DNQ	A	NH

(W) winner; (F) finalist; (SF) semifinalist; (QF) quarterfinalist; (#R) rounds 4, 3, 2, 1; (RR) round-robin stage; (Q#) qualification round; (DNQ) did not qualify; (A) absent; (NH) not held; (SR) strike rate (events won / competed); (W–L) win–loss record.
To avoid confusion and double counting, these charts are updated at the conclusion of a tournament or when the player's participation has ended.

Only main-draw results in WTA Tour, Grand Slam tournaments, Billie Jean King Cup, United Cup, Hopman Cup and Olympic Games are included in win–loss records.

=== Singles ===
Current through the 2023 Tunis Open.

Tournament	2013	2014	2015	2016	2017	2018	2019	2020	2021	2022	2023	2024	SR	W–L	Win%
Grand Slam tournaments
Australian Open	Q1	2R	2R	1R	A	1R	1R	1R	2R	1R	2R	1R	0 / 10	4–10	29%
French Open	2R	3R	1R	1R	A	1R	1R	3R	1R	2R	4R	1R	0 / 11	9–11	45%
Wimbledon	1R	1R	1R	1R	A	1R	1R	NH	Q2	2R	1R	1R	0 / 9	1–9	10%
US Open	2R	1R	3R	1R	Q3	1R	A	A	2R	2R	3R	1R	0 / 9	7–9	44%
Win–loss	2–3	3–4	3–4	0–4	0–0	0–4	0–3	2–2	2–3	3–4	6–4	0–4	0 / 39	21–39	35%
Year-end championships
WTA Elite Trophy (Note: Tournament of Champions was held from 2009 until 2014, when Elite Trophy replaced it.)	DNQ		RR	DNQ				NH			DNQ	NH	0 / 1	1–0	100%
National representation
Summer Olympics	NH			2R	NH				A	NH		4th	0 / 2	5–3	63%
Billie Jean King Cup (Note: Formerly known as Fed Cup until 2020.)	A	A	WG2	WG2	PO	PO	WG2	RR (Note: Edition is split into two years due to COVID-19.)		RR	QR	F	0 / 2	9–9	50%
WTA 1000
Dubai / Qatar Open (Note: The first Premier 5 event of the year has switched back and forth between the Dubai Tennis Championships and the Qatar Ladies Open since 2009. Dubai was classified as a Premier 5 event from 2009 to 2011 before being succeeded by Doha for the 2012–2014 period. In 2015, Dubai regained its Premier 5 status while Doha was demoted to Premier status. The Premier 5 tournaments were reclassified as WTA 1000 tournaments in 2021.)	A	A	A	1R	A	A	A	A	A	A	A	A	0 / 1	0–1	0%
Indian Wells Open	A	1R	1R	2R	Q1	A	1R	NH	1R	A	1R	1R	0 / 7	0–7	0%
Miami Open	A	2R	2R	2R	A	A	1R	NH	Q2	A	1R	1R	0 / 6	2–6	25%
Madrid Open	A	A	A	1R	A	1R	2R	NH	Q2	1R	1R	2R	0 / 6	2–6	25%
Italian Open	A	A	1R	1R	A	A	A	A	A	A	A	1R	0 / 3	0–3	0%
Canadian Open	A	A	A	A	A	A	A	NH	A	A	A	A	0 / 0	0–0	–
Cincinnati Open	A	Q1	QF	1R	A	Q1	A	A	A	A	A	A	0 / 2	3–2	60%
Guadalajara Open	NH									A	A	NMS	0 / 0	0–0	–
Pan Pacific / Wuhan Open (Note: In 2014, the Pan Pacific Open was downgraded to a Premier event and replaced by the Wuhan Open. The Premier 5 tournaments were reclassified as WTA 1000 tournaments in 2021.)	A	Q2	QF	A	A	A	A	NH				A	0 / 1	3–1	75%
China Open	Q2	A	1R	A	A	A	A	NH			A	A	0 / 1	0–1	0%
Win–loss	0–0	1–2	7–6	0–6	0–0	0–1	1–3	0–0	0–1	0–1	0–3		0 / 23	9–23	28%
Career statistics
	2013	2014	2015	2016	2017	2018	2019	2020	2021	2022	2023	2024	SR	W–L	Win%
Tournaments	7	17	24	23	0 (Note: During the season, she did not play in the main draw of any tour-level tournaments. However, she played at the Billie Jean King Cup, which is not counted as a played tournament but matches counted.)	15	12	5	14	17	14		Career total: 148		
Titles	0	0	2	0	0	1	0	0	0	0	0		Career total: 3		
Finals	0	0	3	0	0	1	1	0	0	0	0		Career total: 5		
Hard win–loss	1–3	3–10	21–12	5–15	0–0	5–9	4–6	1–3	9–10	4–8	7–10		1 / 81	60–86	41%
Clay win–loss	2–3	2–5	18–7	2–7	0–1	7–5	3–6	5–2	5–6	3–9	5–4		2 / 55	52–55	49%
Grass win–loss	0–1	0–2	1–3	0–2	0–0	0–1	0–1	NH	NH	1–1	0–1		0 / 12	2–12	14%
Overall win–loss	3–7	5–17	40–22	7–24	0–1	12–15	7–13	6–5	14–16	8–18	12–15		3 / 148	114–153	43%
Win (%)	30%	23%	65%	23%	0%	44%	35%	55%	47%	31%	44%		Career total: 43%		
Year-end ranking (Note: 2011: WTA ranking–634, 2012: WTA ranking–212.)	74	73	26	227	133	77	138	139	84	100	71	110	$4,205,447		

=== Doubles ===
Tournament	2014	2015	2016	...	2020	2021	2022	2023	2024	SR	W–L	Win%
Australian Open	A	1R	1R		A	A	1R	A	1R	0 / 4	0–4	0%
French Open	1R	2R	1R		1R	A	A	A	1R	0 / 5	1–5	17%
Wimbledon	1R	A	1R		NH	A	A	1R	A	0 / 3	0–3	0%
US Open	2R	1R	1R		A	A	A	A	1R	0 / 4	1–4	20%
Win–loss	1–3	1–3	0–4		0–1	0–0	0–1	0–1	0–3	0 / 16	2–16	11%

== Significant finals ==
=== Olympic Games ===
==== Bronze medal match ====
Result	Year	Tournament	Surface	Opponent	Score
4th place	2024	Paris Summer Olympics	Clay	(Poland) Iga Świątek	2–6, 1–6

== WTA Tour finals ==
=== Singles: 5 (3 titles, 2 runner-ups) ===
Legend WTA 500 WTA 250 (3–2)	Finals by surface Hard (1–1) Clay (2–1)

Result	W–L	Date	Tournament	Tier	Surface	Opponent	Score
Loss	0–1	Feb 2015	Rio Open, Brazil	International (Note: The WTA International tournaments were reclassified as WTA 250 tournaments in 2021.)	Clay	(Italy) Sara Errani	6–7^{(2–7)}, 1–6
Win	1–1	Apr 2015	Katowice Open, Poland	International	Hard (i)	(Italy) Camila Giorgi	6–4, 6–3
Win	2–1	Jul 2015	Bucharest Open, Romania	International	Clay	(Italy) Sara Errani	7–6^{(7–3)}, 6–3
Win	3–1	Apr 2018	Copa Colsanitas, Colombia	International	Clay	(Spain) Lara Arruabarrena	6–2, 6–4
Loss	3–2	Jan 2019	Hobart International, Australia	International	Hard	(United States) Sofia Kenin	3–6, 0–6

== WTA 125 finals ==
=== Singles: 3 (2 titles, 1 runner-up) ===
Result	W–L	Date	Tournament	Surface	Opponent	Score
Win	1–0	Jul 2021	Belgrade Challenger, Serbia	Clay	(Netherlands) Arantxa Rus	6–3, 6–3
Loss	1–1	Sep 2023	Parma Ladies Open, Italy	Clay	(Romania) Ana Bogdan	5–7, 1–6
Win	2–1	May 2024	Parma Ladies Open, Italy	Clay	(Egypt) Mayar Sherif	7–5, 2–6, 6–4

== ITF Circuit finals ==
=== Singles: 18 (12 titles, 6 runner-ups) ===
Legend $100,000 tournaments (0–2) $75/80,000 tournaments (2–0) $50/60,000 tournaments (1–1) $25,000 tournaments (5–3) $10,000 tournaments (4–0)	Finals by surface Hard (3–2) Clay (9–3) Carpet (0–1)

Result	W–L	Date	Tournament	Tier	Surface	Opponent	Score
Win	1–0	Oct 2011	ITF Yerevan, Armenia	10,000	Clay	(Georgia (country)) Tatia Mikadze	6–4, 6–3
Win	2–0	Mar 2012	ITF Antalya, Turkey	10,000	Clay	(Germany) Anna-Lena Friedsam	7–6^{(5)}, 6–4
Win	3–0	Apr 2012	ITF Antalya, Turkey	10,000	Hard	(Germany) Anna-Lena Friedsam	7–5, 6–2
Win	4–0	May 2012	ITF Bad Saarow, Germany	10,000	Clay	(Czech Republic) Kateřina Vaňková	6–1, 6–3
Win	5–0	May 2012	Internazionali di Brescia, Italy	25,000	Clay	(Spain) Beatriz García Vidagany	6–3, 6–2
Loss	5–1	Jul 2012	ITF Darmstadt, Germany	25,000	Clay	(Germany) Laura Siegemund	6–7^{(7)}, 3–6
Win	6–1	Oct 2012	ITF Netanya, Israel	25,000	Hard	(Liechtenstein) Stephanie Vogt	0–6, 6–3, 6–4
Loss	6–2	Nov 2012	ITF Helsinki, Finland	25,000	Carpet (i)	(Switzerland) Amra Sadiković	4–6, 0–6
Win	7–2	Apr 2013	ITF Civitavecchia, Italy	25,000	Clay	(Poland) Magda Linette	6–0, 6–1
Loss	7–3	Jul 2013	Open de Biarritz, France	100,000	Clay	(Liechtenstein) Stephanie Vogt	6–1, 3–6, 2–6
Win	8–3	Mar 2014	Osprey Challenger, United States	50,000	Clay	(New Zealand) Marina Erakovic	6–2, 6–3
Win	9–3	May 2014	Empire Slovak Open, Slovakia	75,000	Clay	(Czech Republic) Barbora Strýcová	6–4, 6–2
Loss	9–4	May 2014	Prague Open, Czech Republic	100,000	Clay	(United Kingdom) Heather Watson	6–7^{(5)}, 0–6
Win	10–4	Jun 2017	Grado Tennis Cup, Italy	25,000	Clay	(Italy) Martina Trevisan	2–6, 6–2, 6–4
Win	11–4	Jun 2017	Macha Lake Open, Czech Republic	25,000	Clay	(Belarus) Vera Lapko	6–4, 7–5
Loss	11–5	Aug 2017	Landisville Tennis Challenge, United States	25,000	Hard	(Belarus) Vera Lapko	6–4, 4–6, 6–7^{(4)}
Win	12–5	Oct 2017	Tennis Classic of Macon, United States	80,000	Hard	(United States) Victoria Duval	6–4, 6–1
Loss	12–6	Oct 2022	Trnava Indoor, Slovakia	60,000	Hard (i)	(Germany) Eva Lys	2–6, 6–4, 2–6

=== Doubles: 4 (4 runner-ups) ===
Legend $80,000 tournaments (0–1) $25,000 tournaments (0–1) $10,000 tournaments (0–2)	Finals by surface Hard (0–1) Clay (0–3)

Result	W–L	Date	Tournament	Tier	Surface	Partner	Opponents	Score
Loss	0–1	Jun 2011	ITF Izmir, Turkey	10,000	Clay	(Bulgaria) Aleksandrina Naydenova	(Russia) Tatiana Kotelnikova (Russia) Eugeniya Pashkova	4–6, 0–6
Loss	0–2	Mar 2012	ITF Antalya, Turkey	10,000	Clay	(Slovakia) Chantal Škamlová	(United States) Anamika Bhargava (United States) Sylvia Krywacz	6–4, 4–6, [3–10]
Loss	0–3	Oct 2012	ITF Netanya, Israel	25.000	Hard	(Slovakia) Zuzana Luknárová	(Ukraine) Lyudmyla Kichenok (Ukraine) Nadiia Kichenok	1–6, 4–6
Loss	0–4	May 2013	Empire Slovak Open, Slovakia	80,000	Clay	(Slovakia) Jana Čepelová	(Bosnia and Herzegovina) Mervana Jugić-Salkić (Czech Republic) Renata Voráčová	1–6, 1–6

== Junior Grand Slam tournament finals ==
=== Girls' singles: 1 (runner–up) ===
Result	Year	Tournament	Surface	Opponent	Score
Loss	2012	French Open	Clay	(Germany) Annika Beck	6–3, 5–7, 3–6

== Wins over top-10 players ==
#	Player	Rank	Event	Surface	Rd	Score	ASR
2016
1.	(Italy) Roberta Vinci	No. 8	Rio Summer Olympics	Hard	1R	6–4, 7–5	No. 59
2024
2.	(Italy) Jasmine Paolini	No. 5	Paris Summer Olympics	Clay	3R	7–5, 3–6, 7–5	No. 67
3.	(Czech Republic) Barbora Krejčíková	No. 10	Paris Summer Olympics	Clay	QF	6–4, 6–2	No. 67
