= Empire Slovak Open =

- 2024 Empire Slovak Open

ITF Women's Tour
- Event name: Trnava
- Location: Trnava, Slovakia
- Venue: TC EMPIRE Academy
- Category: ITF Women's Circuit
- Surface: Clay
- Draw: 32S/32Q/16D
- Prize money: $100,000
- Website: Official website

The Empire Slovak Open (previously known as the Empire Trnava Cup) is a tournament for professional female tennis players played on outdoor clay courts. The event is classified as a $100,000 ITF Women's Circuit tournament and has been held in Trnava, Slovakia, since 2009.

== Past finals ==
=== Singles ===
Year	Champion	Runner-up	Score
2026	(United States) Claire Liu	(Czech Republic) Anna Sisková	6–7^{(0–7)}, 7–6^{(7–4)}, 7–6^{(7–5)}
2025	(Germany) Tamara Korpatsch	(Japan) Mai Hontama	1–6, 6–4, 6–4
2024	(Japan) Moyuka Uchijima	(Germany) Mona Barthel	7–6^{(7–3)}, 6–3
2023	(Belgium) Yanina Wickmayer	(Belgium) Greet Minnen	6–0, 6–3
2020–22	Tournament cancelled due to the COVID-19 pandemic		
2019	(United States) Bernarda Pera	(Russia) Anna Blinkova	7–5, 7–5
2018	(Slovakia) Viktória Kužmová	(Paraguay) Verónica Cepede Royg	6–4, 1–6, 6–1
2017	(Czech Republic) Markéta Vondroušová	(Paraguay) Verónica Cepede Royg	7–5, 7–6^{(7–3)}
2016	(Czech Republic) Kateřina Siniaková	(Latvia) Anastasija Sevastova	7–6^{(7–4)}, 5–7, 6–0
2015	(Montenegro) Danka Kovinić	(Russia) Margarita Gasparyan	7–5, 6–3
2014	(Slovakia) Anna Karolína Schmiedlová	(Czech Republic) Barbora Záhlavová-Strýcová	6–4, 6–2
2013	(Czech Republic) Barbora Záhlavová-Strýcová	(Italy) Karin Knapp	6–2, 6–4
2012	(Latvia) Anastasija Sevastova	(Croatia) Ana Savić	w/o
2011	(Austria) Yvonne Meusburger	(Bulgaria) Elitsa Kostova	0–6, 6–2, 6–0
2010	(Czech Republic) Sandra Záhlavová	(Slovakia) Lenka Juríková	2–6, 6–3, 6–1
2009	(Austria) Yvonne Meusburger	(Czech Republic) Sandra Záhlavová	7–6^{(7–0)}, 7–5

=== Doubles ===
Year	Champions	Runners-up	Score
2026	(Finland) Laura Hietaranta (Slovakia) Nina Vargová	(Spain) María Martínez Vaquero (Spain) Alba Rey García	6–2, 6–3
2025	(France) Estelle Cascino (France) Carole Monnet	(Netherlands) Arianne Hartono (India) Prarthana Thombare	6–2, 6–2
2024	(Slovenia) Veronika Erjavec (Slovenia) Tamara Zidanšek	(Slovenia) Dalila Jakupović (United States) Sabrina Santamaria	6–4, 6–4
2023	Amina Anshba (Czech Republic) Anastasia Dețiuc	(France) Estelle Cascino (Netherlands) Suzan Lamens	6–3, 4–6, [10–4]
2020–22	Tournament cancelled due to the COVID-19 pandemic		
2019	(Russia) Anna Blinkova (Switzerland) Xenia Knoll	(Sweden) Cornelia Lister (Czech Republic) Renata Voráčová	7–5, 7–5
2018	(Australia) Jessica Moore (Kazakhstan) Galina Voskoboeva	(Switzerland) Xenia Knoll (United Kingdom) Anna Smith	0–6, 6–3, [10–7]
2017	(United Kingdom) Naomi Broady (United Kingdom) Heather Watson	(Chinese Taipei) Chuang Chia-jung (Czech Republic) Renata Voráčová	6–3, 6–2
2016	(Russia) Anna Kalinskaya (Slovakia) Tereza Mihalíková	(Russia) Evgeniya Rodina (Latvia) Anastasija Sevastova	6–1, 7–6^{(7–4)}
2015	(Ukraine) Yuliya Beygelzimer (Russia) Margarita Gasparyan	(Serbia) Aleksandra Krunić (Croatia) Petra Martić	6–3, 6–2
2014	(Liechtenstein) Stephanie Vogt (China) Zheng Saisai	(Russia) Margarita Gasparyan (Russia) Evgeniya Rodina	6–4, 6–2
2013	(Bosnia and Herzegovina) Mervana Jugić-Salkić (Czech Republic) Renata Voráčová	(Slovakia) Jana Čepelová (Slovakia) Anna Karolína Schmiedlová	6–1, 6–1
2012	(Romania) Elena Bogdan (Czech Republic) Renata Voráčová	(Poland) Marta Domachowska (Austria) Sandra Klemenschits	7–6^{(7–2)}, 6–4
2011	(Slovakia) Janette Husárová (Czech Republic) Renata Voráčová	(Slovakia) Jana Čepelová (Slovakia) Lenka Wienerová	7–6^{(7–2)}, 6–1
2010	(Czech Republic) Iveta Gerlová (Czech Republic) Lucie Kriegsmannová	(Slovakia) Michaela Hončová (Slovakia) Lenka Wienerová	6–2, 6–1
2009	(Austria) Sandra Klemenschits (Czech Republic) Vladimíra Uhlířová	(Czech Republic) Michaela Paštiková (Czech Republic) Darina Šeděnková	6–4, 6–2
