= Jana Čepelová =

Slovak tennis player (born 1993)

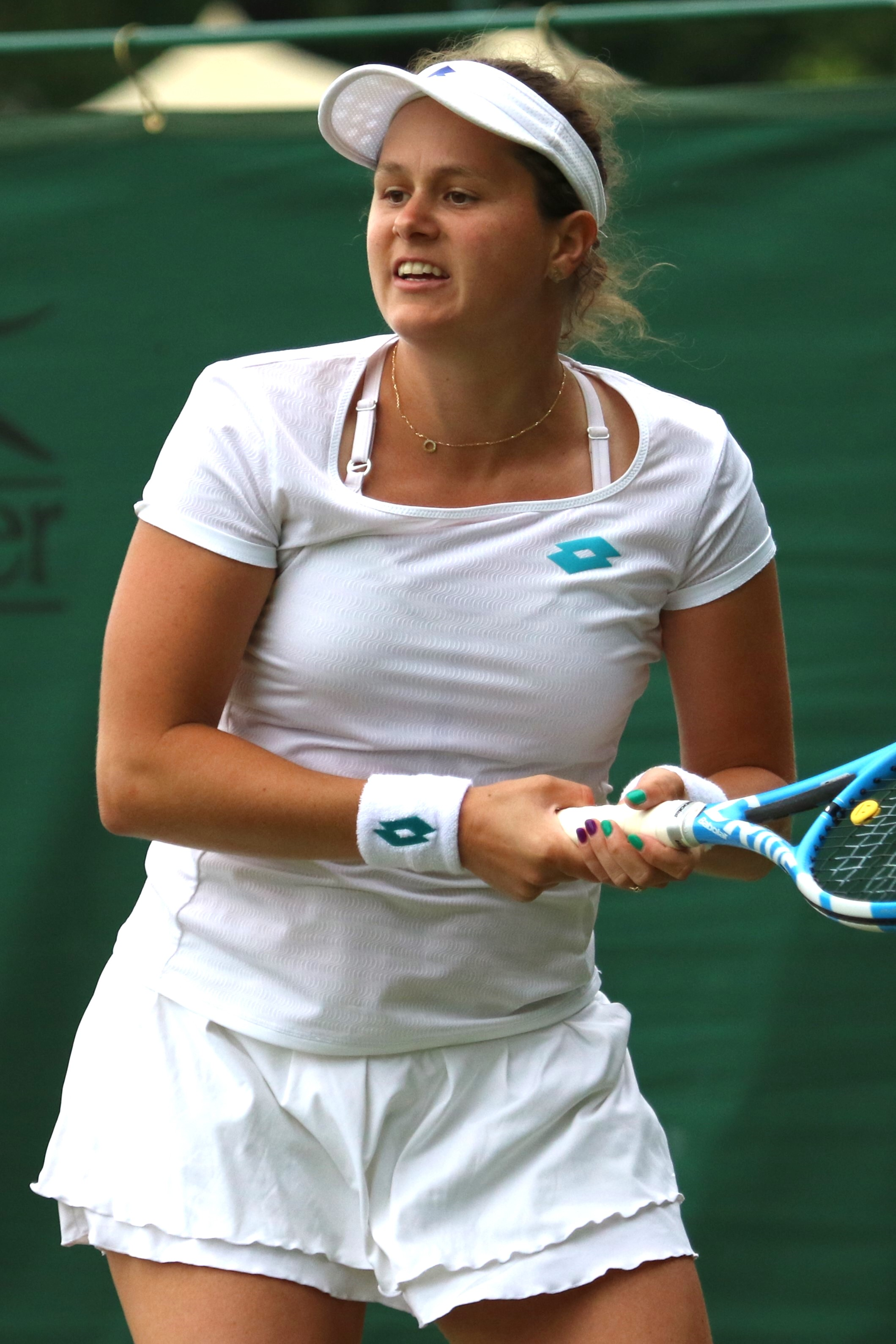
- Čepelová at the 2023 Wimbledon Championships
- Country (sports): Slovakia
- Residence: Košice, Slovakia
- Born: 29 May 1993 (age 33) Košice
- Height: 1.68 m (5 ft 6 in)
- Turned pro: 2012
- Retired: 2023
- Plays: Right (two-handed backhand)
- Coach: Martin Zathurecký
- Prize money: US$ 1,851,210

Singles
- Career record: 322–235
- Career titles: 7 ITF
- Highest ranking: No. 50 (12 May 2014)

Grand Slam singles results
- Australian Open: 2R (2013)
- French Open: 2R (2013)
- Wimbledon: 3R (2012, 2016)
- US Open: 2R (2014)

Doubles
- Career record: 61–53
- Career titles: 3 ITF
- Highest ranking: No. 158 (18 May 2015)

Grand Slam doubles results
- French Open: 2R (2014, 2017)
- Wimbledon: 2R (2013)
- US Open: 2R (2017)

Team competitions
- Fed Cup: SF (2013), record 8–10

Jana Čepelová (Slovak pronunciation: [ˈjana ˈtʂepelɔʋaː]; born 29 May 1993) is a Slovak former professional tennis player.

Čepelová won seven singles and three doubles titles on the ITF Women's Circuit. On 12 May 2014, she reached her best singles ranking of world No. 50. On 18 May 2015, she peaked at No. 158 in the doubles rankings.

Her best result at a major event was the third round of the 2012 and 2016 Wimbledon Championships. As a junior, she won the girls' doubles at the 2010 Australian Open with Chantal Škamlová.

Following the birth of the daughter in 2020, Čepelová took a break from her tennis career. In 2023, she made a "quick comeback, just to say good bye and play the final Grand Slam tournaments".

== Personal life ==
Čepelová was born in Košice to Peter and Jarmila and was coached by Martin Zathurecký.

== Career ==
=== Junior career ===
Jana Čepelová and Chantal Škamlová won the girls' doubles at 2010 Australian Open. They also won silver medals in doubles at 2010 Summer Youth Olympics. At the same event, Čepelová won the bronze medal in singles.

=== 2012: Coming onto the WTA Tour ===
Čepelová spent most of her 2012-year on the ITF Circuit. Her best achievement on the WTA Tour was at the Wimbledon Championships. She qualified for the main draw by defeating Alla Kudryavtseva, Chanel Simmonds and Ekaterina Bychkova. In round one, she beat fellow qualifier Kristina Mladenovic in three sets. In the second round, she upset 26th seed Anabel Medina Garrigues before she lost to world No. 2, Victoria Azarenka.

=== 2014: First WTA Tour final ===
At the Family Circle Cup in Charleston, Čepelová scored the biggest win of her career, defeating world No. 1 Serena Williams in the second round. Čepelová would go on to reach her first WTA tournament final with victories over Elena Vesnina, Daniela Hantuchová, and Belinda Bencic. Her run ended there as she lost to Andrea Petkovic.

=== 2015 ===
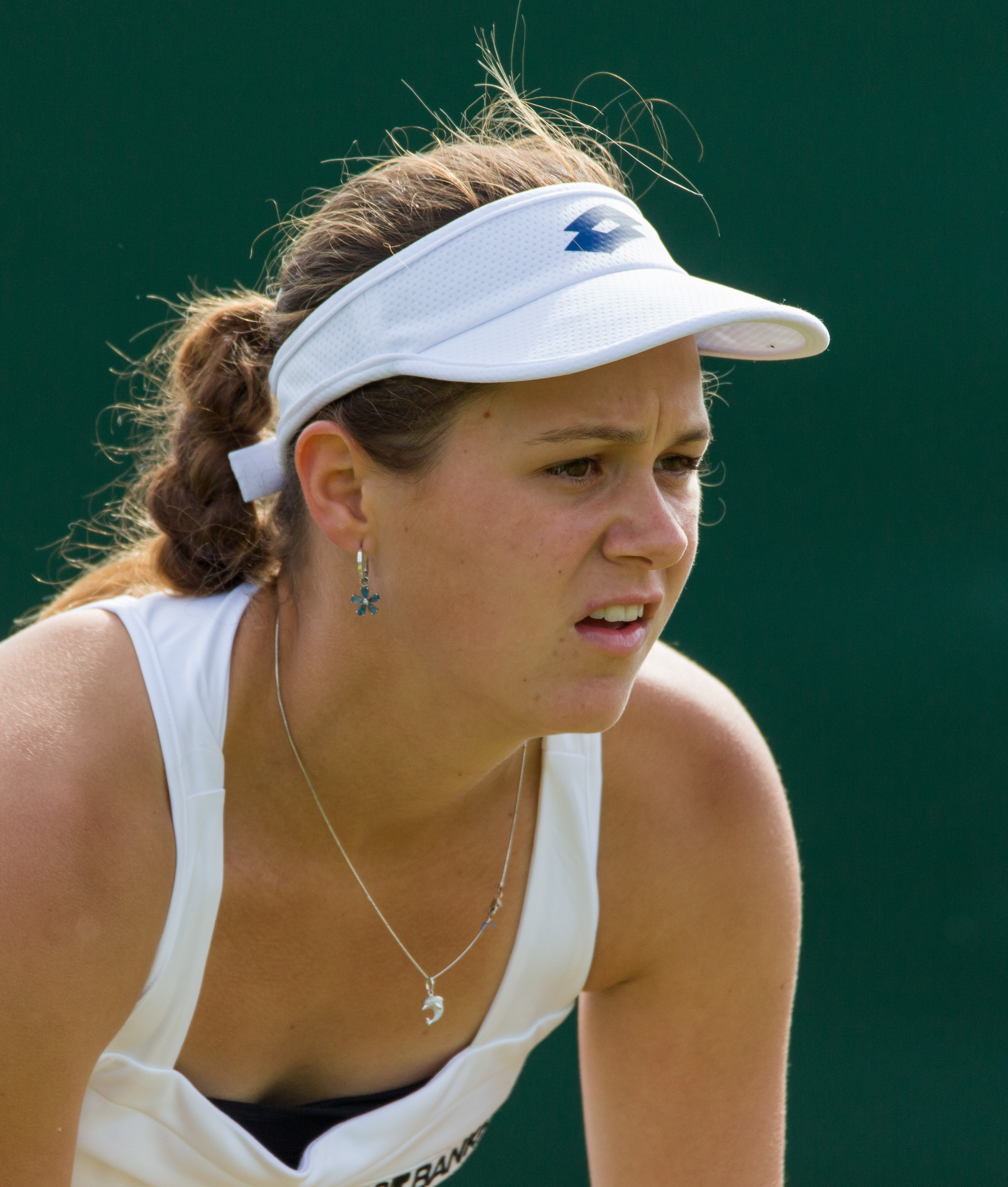
Čepelová at the 2015 Wimbledon Championships

Čepelová started the year at the Auckland Open. She lost in the first round to third seed, last year finalist, and eventual champion Venus Williams. At the Hobart International, Čepelová was defeated in the first round by Annika Beck.

Playing at the Indian Wells Open, Čepelová lost in the first round to qualifier Lucie Hradecká. At Miami, she was defeated in the first round by Julia Görges. Seeded second at The Oaks Club Challenger in Florida, Čepelová fell in the first round to Laura Siegemund.

Last year finalist at the Family Circle Cup, Čepelová lost in the second round to fourth seed Sara Errani. At the Prague Open, she was defeated in the first round by Elena Vesnina. Competing at the Slovak Open, Čepelová lost in the first round to Tereza Smitková. Seeded eighth at the Open Saint-Gaudens, she reached the final where she was defeated by María Teresa Torró Flor. At the French Open, Čepelová lost in the second round of qualifying to Kateryna Bondarenko. At the Open Féminin de Marseille, she was defeated in the second round by sixth seed Denisa Allertová.

At the Nottingham Open, Čepelová's first grass-court tournament of the season, she lost in the first round of qualifying to Donna Vekić. At the Birmingham Classic, she was defeated in the first round of qualifying by Mariana Duque Mariño. Coming into Wimbledon ranked 106 in the world, Čepelová upset third seed Simona Halep in the first round. She lost in the second round to Monica Niculescu.

=== 2016 ===
At Wimbledon in 2016, Čepelová defeated Garbiñe Muguruza in the second round, her third top-three win, before losing to Lucie Šafářová in an epic three-set match.

=== 2020 ===
Beginning the season at the Australian Open, Čepelová withdrew from her first round of qualifying match against Kurumi Nara.

At the Qatar Ladies Open, she lost in the final round of qualifying to Jil Teichmann. Playing at the first edition of the Lyon Open, Čepelová was defeated in the first round of qualifying by Margot Yerolymos.

=== 2023: Comeback and retirement ===
In June 2023, Čepelová announced her retirement from professional tour, with her last tournament being the 2023 US Open.

== Grand Slam performance timeline ==
Key
W	F	SF	QF	#R	RR	Q#	P#	DNQ	A	Z#	PO	G	S	B	NMS	NTI	P	NH

(W) winner; (F) finalist; (SF) semifinalist; (QF) quarterfinalist; (#R) rounds 4, 3, 2, 1; (RR) round-robin stage; (Q#) qualification round; (P#) preliminary round; (DNQ) did not qualify; (A) absent; (Z#) Davis/Fed Cup Zonal Group (with number indication) or (PO) play-off; (G) gold, (S) silver or (B) bronze Olympic/Paralympic medal; (NMS) not a Masters tournament; (NTI) not a Tier I tournament; (P) postponed; (NH) not held; (SR) strike rate (events won / competed); (W–L) win–loss record.
To avoid confusion and double counting, these charts are updated at the conclusion of a tournament or when the player's participation has ended.

=== Singles ===
Tournament	2012	2013	2014	2015	2016	2017	2018	2019	2020	2021	SR	W–L	!Win %
Australian Open	Q1	2R	1R	A	Q2	1R	1R	Q1	Q1	A	0 / 4	1–4	20%
French Open	Q1	2R	1R	Q2	Q2	1R	A	A	Q1	A	0 / 3	1–3	25%
Wimbledon	3R	2R	1R	2R	3R	1R	Q1	Q3	NH	A	0 / 6	6–6	50%
US Open	Q3	1R	2R	Q2	Q3	1R	A	1R	A	A	0 / 4	1–4	20%
Win–loss	2–1	3–4	1–4	1–1	2–1	0–4	0–1	0–1	0–0	0–0	0 / 17	9–17	35%
WTA 1000
Dubai / Qatar Open (Note: The first Premier 5 event of the year has switched back and forth between the Dubai Tennis Championships and the Qatar Ladies Open since 2009. Dubai was classified as a Premier 5 event from 2009 to 2011 before being succeeded by Doha for the 2012–2014 period. In 2015, Dubai regained its Premier 5 status while Doha was demoted to Premier status. The two tournaments have since alternated status every year.)	A	A	3R	A	1R	A	A	A	Q2	A	0 / 2	2–2	50%
Indian Wells Open	A	Q1	1R	1R	Q2	A	Q2	A	NH		0 / 2	0–2	0%
Miami Open	A	1R	2R	1R	1R	3R	Q2	A	NH	A	0 / 5	2–5	29%
Madrid Open	A	A	Q2	A	A	A	A	A	NH	A	0 / 0	0–0	–
Italian Open	A	A	Q1	A	A	Q1	A	A	A	A	0 / 0	0–0	–
Canadian Open	2R	1R	A	A	A	Q1	A	Q1	NH		0 / 2	1–2	33%
Cincinnati Open	Q1	1R	A	Q2	A	A	A	A	A		0 / 1	0–1	0%
China Open	A	A	A	A	Q1	A	A	A	NH		0 / 0	0–0	–
Win–loss	1–1	0–3	2–3	0–2	0–2	2–1	0–0	0–0	0–0	0–0	0 / 12	5–12	29%

== WTA Tour finals ==
=== Singles: 1 (runner–up) ===
Legend Grand Slam tournaments Premier M & Premier 5 Premier (0–1) International	Finals by surface Hard (0–0) Clay (0–1) Grass (0–0) Carpet (0–0)

Result	W–L	Date	Tournament	Tier	Surface	Opponent	Score
Loss	0–1	Apr 2014	Charleston Open, United States	Premier	Clay (green)	(Germany) Andrea Petkovic	5–7, 2–6

== ITF Circuit finals ==
=== Singles: 13 (7 titles, 6 runner–ups) ===
Legend $100,000 tournaments (1–1) $75,000 tournaments (1–0) $50,000 tournaments (0–1) $25,000 tournaments (3–2) $10,000 tournaments (2–2)	Finals by surface Hard (3–4) Clay (4–2)

Result	W–L	Date	Tournament	Tier	Surface	Opponent	Score
Loss	0–1	Feb 2010	ITF Eilat, Israel	10,000	Hard	(Austria) Janina Toljan	1–6, 2–6
Loss	0–2	Oct 2010	ITF Monastir, Tunisia	10,000	Hard	(Czech Republic) Martina Borecká	5–7, 1–6
Win	1–2	Oct 2010	ITF Monastir, Tunisia	10,000	Hard	(Latvia) Diāna Marcinkēviča	6–2, 6–2
Win	2–2	Jan 2011	ITF Stuttgart, Germany	10,000	Hard (i)	(Germany) Nina Zander	6–4, 6–4
Win	3–2	Jue 2011	ITF Kristinehamn, Sweden	25,000	Clay	(Romania) Alexandra Cadanțu	6–4, 3–6, 6–4
Loss	3–3	Jun 2011	ITF Ystad, Sweden	25,000	Clay	(Bulgaria) Dia Evtimova	3–6, 4–6
Win	4–3	Aug 2011	ITF Prague-Neride, Czech Republic	25,000	Clay	(Netherlands) Bibiane Schoofs	7–6^{(6)}, 6–4
Loss	4–4	Nov 2011	ITF Helsinki, Finland	25,000	Hard (i)	(Hungary) Tímea Babos	3–6, 1–6
Win	5–4	Nov 2013	Dubai Tennis Challenge, UAE	75,000	Hard	(Italy) Maria Elena Camerin	6–1, 6–2
Loss	5–5	May 2015	Open Saint-Gaudens, France	50,000	Clay	(Spain) María Teresa Torró Flor	1–6, 0–6
Win	6–5	Jul 2017	Budapest Ladies Open, Hungary	100,000	Clay	(Montenegro) Danka Kovinić	6–4, 6–3
Loss	6–6	Oct 2018	Suzhou Ladies Open, China	100,000	Hard	(China) Zheng Saisai	5–7, 1–6
Win	7–6	Sep 2020	ITF Prague, Czech Republic	25,000	Clay	(Mexico) Renata Zarazúa	6–4, 7–6^{(4)}

=== Doubles: 8 (3 titles, 5 runner–ups) ===
Legend $100,000 tournaments (0–1) $75,000 tournaments (0–1) $50,000 tournaments (0–1) $25,000 tournaments (3–1) $10,000 tournaments (0–1)	Finals by surface Hard (1–1) Clay (2–4)

Result	W–L	Date	Tournament	Tier	Surface	Partner	Opponents	Score
Loss	0–1	Jan 2011	ITF Stuttgart, Germany	10,000	Hard (i)	(Slovakia) Michaela Pochabová	(Netherlands) Daniëlle Harmsen (Russia) Marina Melnikova	6–3, 4–6, [12–14]
Loss	0–2	Aug 2011	Empire Slovak Open, Slovakia	50,000	Clay	(Slovakia) Lenka Wienerová	(Slovakia) Janette Husárová (Czech Republic) Renata Voráčová	6–7^{(2)}, 1–6
Loss	0–3	Aug 2011	ITF Prague-Neride, Czech Republic	25,000	Clay	(Poland) Katarzyna Piter	(Czech Republic) Iveta Gerlová (Czech Republic) Lucie Kriegsmannová	7–6^{(8)}, 1–6, [8–10]
Win	1–3	Oct 2011	ITF Sant Cugat del Vallès, Spain	25,000	Clay	(Poland) Katarzyna Piter	(Spain) Leticia Costas (Spain) Inés Ferrer Suárez	6–3, 2–6, [10–6]
Win	2–3	Feb 2012	ITF Rabat, Morocco	25,000	Clay	(Hungary) Réka Luca Jani	(Italy) Anastasia Grymalska (Belarus) Ilona Kremen	6–7^{(4)}, 6–1, [10–4]
Win	3–3	Mar 2012	ITF Poza Rica, Mexico	25,000	Hard	(Slovakia) Lenka Wienerová	(Italy) Maria Elena Camerin (Ukraine) Mariya Koryttseva	7–5, 2–6, [10–3]
Loss	3–4	May 2013	Empire Slovak Open, Slovakia	75,000	Clay	(Slovakia) Anna Karolína Schmiedlová	(Bosnia and Herzegovina) Mervana Jugić-Salkić (Czech Republic) Renata Voráčová	1–6, 1–6
Loss	3–5	May 2016	Open de Marseille, France	100,000	Clay	(Spain) Lourdes Domínguez Lino	(Chinese Taipei) Hsieh Su-wei (United States) Nicole Melichar	6–1, 3–6, [3–10]

== Junior Grand Slam tournament finals ==
=== Girls' doubles: 1 (title) ===
Result	Year	Tournament	Surface	Partner	Opponents	Score
Win	2010	Australian Open	Hard	(Slovakia) Chantal Škamlová	(Hungary) Tímea Babos (Canada) Gabriela Dabrowski	7–6^{(1)}, 6–2

== Head-to-head record ==
=== No. 1 wins ===
#	Player	Event	Surface	Rd	Score	Result
1.	(United States) Serena Williams	2014 Family Circle Cup, United States	Clay	2R	6–4, 6–4	Final

=== Top 10 wins ===
#	Player	Rank	Event	Surface	Rd	Score
2014
1.	(United States) Serena Williams	No. 1	Family Circle Cup, United States	Clay	2R	6–4, 6–4
2015
2.	(Romania) Simona Halep	No. 3	Wimbledon, United Kingdom	Grass	1R	5–7, 6–4, 6–3
2016
3.	(Spain) Garbiñe Muguruza	No. 2	Wimbledon, United Kingdom	Grass	2R	6–3, 6–2
