= 2022 Billie Jean King Cup Asia/Oceania Zone =

Subsection of tennis competition

The Asia/Oceania Zone is one of three zones of regional competition in the 2022 Billie Jean King Cup.

== Group I ==
- Venue: Megasaray Tennis Academy, Antalya, Turkey (clay)
- Date: 12–16 April 2022

The six teams were placed into one pool of six teams. The nations finishing 1st and 2nd advanced to the 2022 Billie Jean King Cup play-offs. The nations finishing fifth and last were relegated to Group II for 2023.

=== Seeding ===
Pot	Nation	Rank^{1}	Seed
1	Japan	18	1
1	China	22	2
1	South Korea	28	3
1	India	30	4
1	Indonesia	32	5
1	New Zealand	35	6

- ^{1}Billie Jean King Cup Rankings as of 8 November 2021

=== Pools ===
	Pool A	JPN	CHN	IND	KOR	NZL	INA
1	Japan (5–0)		2–1	3–0	2–1	3–0	3–0
2	China (4–1)	1–2		3–0	2–1	3–0	3–0
3	India (3–2)	0–3	0–3		2–1	2–1	2–1
4	South Korea (2–3)	1–2	1–2	1–2		3–0	3–0
5	New Zealand (1–4)	0–3	0–3	1–2	0–3		2–1
6	Indonesia (0–5)	0–3	0–3	1–2	0–3	1–2	

- China and Japan were promoted to the 2022 Billie Jean King Cup play-offs.
- Indonesia and New Zealand were relegated to Asia/Oceania Zone Group II in 2023.

== Group II ==
- Venue 1: National Tennis Center, Kuala Lumpur, Malaysia (hard)
- Venue 2: Central Stadium Frunze, Dushanbe, Tajikistan (hard)
- Dates: 8–13 August 2022 (Kuala Lumpur) / 22–27 August 2022 (Dushanbe)

Eighteen nations competed in Group II of the Asia/Oceania Zone in two venues. In Kuala Lumpur, ten nations were split into two groups of 5, with the top finishing nations competing in a promotion play-off to advance to Group I in 2023. In Dushanbe, eight nations were split into two groups of 4, with the top finishing nations competing in a promotion play-off to advance to Group I in 2023.

=== Seeding ===
Kuala Lumpur

Pot	Nation	Rank^{1}	Seed
1	Chinese Taipei	58	1
1	Singapore	61	2
2	Thailand	64	3
2	Hong Kong	81	4
3	Malaysia	84	5
3	Iran	85	6
4	Pacific Oceania	91	7
4	Vietnam	98	8
5	Laos	NR	–
5	Maldives	NR	–

- ^{1}Billie Jean King Cup Rankings as of 19 April 2022

Dushanbe

Pot	Nation	Rank^{1}	Seed
1	Uzbekistan	57	1
1	Pakistan	63	2
2	Turkmenistan	73	3
2	Sri Lanka	74	4
3	Guam	88	5
3	Mongolia	93	6
4	Tajikistan	99	7
4	Brunei	NR	–

- ^{1}Billie Jean King Cup Rankings as of 19 April 2022

=== Pools ===
	Pool A (Kuala Lumpur)	HKG	TPE	VIE	IRI	LAO
1	Hong Kong (4–0)		2–1	3–0	3–0	3–0
2	Chinese Taipei (3–1)	1–2		2–1	3–0	3–0
3	Vietnam (2–2)	0–3	1–2		2–1	3–0
4	Iran (1–3)	0–3	0–3	1–2		3–0
5	Laos (0–4)	0–3	0–3	0–3	0–3	

	Pool B (Kuala Lumpur)	THA	POC	MAS	SGP	MDV
1	Thailand (4–0)		3–0	3–0	3–0	3–0
2	Pacific Oceania (3–1)	0–3		2–1	3–0	3–0
3	Malaysia (2–2)	0–3	1–2		2–1	3–0
4	Singapore (1–3)	0–3	0–3	1–2		3–0
5	Maldives (0–4)	0–3	0–3	0–3	0–3	

	Pool A (Dushanbe)	UZB	SRI	GUM	BRU
1	Uzbekistan (3–0)		2–1	3–0	3–0
2	Sri Lanka (2–1)	1–2		3–0	3–0
3	Guam (1–2)	0–3	0–3		3–0
4	Brunei (0–3)	0–3	0–3	0–3	

	Pool B (Dushanbe)	MGL	PAK	TKM	TJK
1	Mongolia (3–0)		3–0	3–0	3–0
2	Pakistan (2–1)	0–3		2–1	3–0
3	Turkmenistan (1–2)	0–3	1–2		3–0
4	Tajikistan (0–3)	0–3	0–3	0–3	

=== Play-offs ===
Placing (Kuala Lumpur)	A Team	Score	B Team
Promotional	Hong Kong	0–2	Thailand
3rd–4th	Chinese Taipei	2–1	Pacific Oceania
5th–6th	Vietnam	1–2	Malaysia
7th–8th	Iran	0–2	Singapore
9th–10th	Laos	2–1	Maldives

Placing (Dushanbe)	A Team	Score	B Team
Promotional	Uzbekistan	2–1	Mongolia
3rd–4th	Sri Lanka	3–0	Pakistan
5th–6th	Guam	2–1	Turkmenistan
7th–8th	Brunei	1–2	Tajikistan

=== Final placements ===
Placing	Teams	
Promoted/First	Thailand	Uzbekistan
Second	Hong Kong	Mongolia
Third	Chinese Taipei	Sri Lanka
Fourth	Pacific Oceania	Pakistan
Fifth	Malaysia	Guam
Sixth	Vietnam	Turkmenistan
Seventh	Singapore	Tajikistan
Eighth	Iran	Brunei
Ninth	Laos	
Tenth	Maldives	

- Thailand and Uzbekistan were promoted to Asia/Oceania Zone Group I in 2023.
