= 2022 Billie Jean King Cup Asia/Oceania Zone Group II – play-offs =

Subsection of tennis competition

The play-offs of the 2022 Billie Jean King Cup Asia/Oceania Zone Group II were the final stages of the Group II zonal competition involving teams from Asia/Oceania. Using the positions determined in their pools, the eighteen teams faced off to determine their placing in the 2022 Billie Jean King Cup Asia/Oceania Zone Group II. The top two teams advanced to Billie Jean King Cup Asia/Oceania Zone Group I.

| Placing | Pool A (Kuala Lumpur) | Pool B (Kuala Lumpur) | Pool A (Dushanbe) | Pool B (Dushanbe) |
|---|---|---|---|---|
| 1 | Hong Kong | Thailand | Uzbekistan | Mongolia |
| 2 | Chinese Taipei | Pacific Oceania | Sri Lanka | Pakistan |
| 3 | Vietnam | Malaysia | Guam | Turkmenistan |
| 4 | Iran | Singapore | Brunei | Tajikistan |
| 5 | Laos | Maldives | — | |

== Promotional play-offs ==
The first placed teams of each pool were drawn in head-to-head round. The winners advanced to Group I in 2023.

=== Hong Kong vs. Thailand ===
Hong Kong
0
National Tennis Center, Kuala Lumpur, Malaysia
13 August 2022
Hard

Thailand
2

| | | | 1 | 2 | 3 |
|---|---|---|---|---|---|---|
| 1 | (Hong Kong) (Thailand) | Wu Ho-ching; Anchisa Chanta | 4; 6 | 1; 6 |
| 2 | (Hong Kong) (Thailand) | Eudice Chong; Patcharin Cheapchandej | 3; 6 | 2; 6 |
| 3 | (Hong Kong) (Thailand) | Eudice Chong / Maggie Ng; Punnin Kovapitukted / Lanlana Tararudee | | | | not played |

=== Uzbekistan vs. Mongolia ===
Uzbekistan
2
Central Stadium Frunze, Dushanbe, Tajikistan
27 August 2022
Hard

Mongolia
1

| | | | 1 | 2 | 3 |
|---|---|---|---|---|---|
| 1 | (Uzbekistan) (Mongolia) | Ominahon Valihanova; Martaa Chogsomjav | 5; 7 | 2; 6 |
| 2 | (Uzbekistan) (Mongolia) | Akgul Amanmuradova; Maralgoo Chogsomjav | 6; 2 | 6; 1 |
| 3 | (Uzbekistan) (Mongolia) | Akgul Amanmuradova / Ominahon Valihanova; Maralgoo Chogsomjav / Martaa Chogsomjav | 6; 2 | 6; 3 |

== 3rd to 4th play-offs ==
The second placed teams of each pool were drawn in head-to-head rounds to find the 3rd placed teams.

=== Chinese Taipei vs. Pacific Oceania ===
Chinese Taipei
2
National Tennis Center, Kuala Lumpur, Malaysia
13 August 2022
Hard

Pacific Oceania
1

| | | | 1 | 2 | 3 |
|---|---|---|---|---|---|---|
| 1 | (Chinese Taipei) (Pacific Oceania) | Lee Ya-hsin; Kalani Soli | 7; 5 | 3; 0 | | retired |
| 2 | (Chinese Taipei) (Pacific Oceania) | Yang Ya-yi; Violet Apisah | 3; 6 | 6^{7} 7^{9} |
| 3 | (Chinese Taipei) (Pacific Oceania) | Hsu Chieh-yu / Lee Pei-chi; Violet Apisah / Kalani Soli | 5; 7 | 6; 1 | 6; 4 |

=== Sri Lanka vs. Pakistan ===
Sri Lanka
3
Central Stadium Frunze, Dushanbe, Tajikistan
26 August 2022
Hard

Pakistan
0

| | | | 1 | 2 | 3 |
|---|---|---|---|---|---|
| 1 | (Sri Lanka) (Pakistan) | Anjalika Kurera; Ushna Suhail | 4; 6 | 6; 3 | 7; 5 |
| 2 | (Sri Lanka) (Pakistan) | Rukshika Wijesooriya; Sarah Mahboob Khan | 6; 0 | 6; 1 |
| 3 | (Sri Lanka) (Pakistan) | Hasali Gajaba / Neyara Weerawansa; Meheq Khokhar / Noor Malik | 6; 1 | 6; 2 |

== 5th to 6th play-offs ==
The third placed teams of each pool were drawn in head-to-head rounds to find the 5th placed teams.

=== Vietnam vs. Malaysia ===
Vietnam
1
National Tennis Center, Kuala Lumpur, Malaysia
13 August 2022
Hard

Malaysia
2

| | | | 1 | 2 | 3 |
|---|---|---|---|---|---|
| 1 | (Vietnam) (Malaysia) | Sophia Huỳnh Trần Ngọc Nhi; Lim Sze-xuan | 2; 6 | 3; 6 |
| 2 | (Vietnam) (Malaysia) | Savanna Lý-Nguyễn; Iman Syuhada Abdullah | 6; 1 | 6; 1 |
| 3 | (Vietnam) (Malaysia) | Đào Minh Trang / Savanna Lý-Nguyễn; Jawairiah Noordin / Hannah Seen Ean Yip | 5; 7 | 3; 6 |

=== Guam vs. Turkmenistan ===
Guam
2
Central Stadium Frunze, Dushanbe, Tajikistan
26 August 2022
Hard

Turkmenistan
1

| | | | 1 | 2 | 3 |
|---|---|---|---|---|---|---|
| 1 | (Guam) (Turkmenistan) | Sydney Packbier; Aisha Bikbulatova | 3; 6 | 2; 6 |
| 2 | (Guam) (Turkmenistan) | Fremont Gibson; Anastasiya Azimbayeva | 6; 3 | 1; 0 | | retired |
| 3 | (Guam) (Turkmenistan) | Fremont Gibson / Sydney Packbier; Aisha Bikbulatova / Meryem Muhammedova | 6; 2 | 6; 4 |

== 7th to 8th play-offs ==
The fourth placed teams of each pool were drawn in head-to-head rounds to find the 7th placed teams.

=== Iran vs. Singapore ===
Iran
0
National Tennis Center, Kuala Lumpur, Malaysia
13 August 2022
Hard

Singapore
2

| | | | 1 | 2 | 3 |
|---|---|---|---|---|---|---|
| 1 | (Iran) (Singapore) | Nili Atfi; Michelle Yeo | 5; 7 | 4; 6 |
| 2 | (Iran) (Singapore) | Mehraneh Zohourian; Sue Yan Tan | 0; 6 | 0; 6 |
| 3 | (Iran) (Singapore) | Nili Atfi / Mehraneh Zohourian; Alexis Lara Chua / Audrey Tong | | | | not played |

=== Brunei vs. Tajikistan ===
Brunei
1
Central Stadium Frunze, Dushanbe, Tajikistan
26 August 2022
Hard

Tajikistan
2

| | | | 1 | 2 | 3 |
|---|---|---|---|---|---|
| 1 | (Brunei) (Tajikistan) | Chong Ming-rui; Sumaya Tukhtaeva | 6; 4 | 3; 6 | 6; 4 |
| 2 | (Brunei) (Tajikistan) | Tan Jia-hui; Anastasiya Tursunova | 1; 6 | 0; 6 |
| 3 | (Brunei) (Tajikistan) | Chong Ming-rui / Tan Jia-hui; Sumaya Tukhtaeva / Anastasiya Tursunova | 2; 6 | 2; 6 |

== 9th to 10th play-offs ==
The fifth placed teams of each pool were drawn in head-to-head rounds to find the 9th placed team.

=== Laos vs. Maldives ===
Laos
2
National Tennis Center, Kuala Lumpur, Malaysia
13 August 2022
Hard

Maldives
1

| | | | 1 | 2 | 3 |
|---|---|---|---|---|---|
| 1 | (Laos) (Maldives) | Thirada Phommachack; Sarah Akram | 5; 7 | 6; 3 | 6; 1 |
| 2 | (Laos) (Maldives) | Phonesamai Champamanivong; Aaara Aasaal Azim | 0; 6 | 0; 6 |
| 3 | (Laos) (Maldives) | Phonesamai Champamanivong / Thirada Phommachack; Aaara Aasaal Azim / Nayara Usama Ali | 6; 4 | 6; 1 |

== Final placements ==
| Placing | Teams | |
| Promoted/First | Thailand | Uzbekistan |
| Second | Hong Kong | Mongolia |
| Third | Chinese Taipei | Sri Lanka |
| Fourth | Pacific Oceania | Pakistan |
| Fifth | Malaysia | Guam |
| Sixth | Vietnam | Turkmenistan |
| Seventh | Singapore | Tajikistan |
| Eighth | Iran | Brunei |
| Ninth | Laos | |
| Tenth | Maldives | |

- Thailand and Uzbekistan were promoted to Asia/Oceania Zone Group I in 2023.
