= 2024 Billie Jean King Cup Asia/Oceania Zone =

Subsection of tennis competition

The Asia/Oceania Zone is one of three zones of regional competition in the 2024 Billie Jean King Cup.

== Group I ==
- Venue: Moon Island Clay Park, Changsha, China (Clay)
- Date: 8–13 April 2024

The six teams were placed into one pool of six teams. The nations finishing 1st and 2nd advanced to the 2024 Billie Jean King Cup play-offs. The nations finishing fifth and last were relegated to Group II for 2025.

=== Participating teams ===
Souce:

- China

Zheng Qinwen, Wang Xinyu, Wang Xiyu, Zhu Lin, Guo Hanyu, Liu Feng (captain)

- South Korea

Jang Su-jeong, Park So-hyun, Ku Yeon-woo, Kim Da-bin

- India

Ankita Raina, Sahaja Yamalapalli, Rutuja Bhosale, Shrivalli Bhamidipaty, Prarthana Thombare, Shalini Thakar (captain)

- New Zealand

Lulu Sun, Monique Barry, Erin Routliffe, Valentina Ivanov, Paige Hourigan

- Chinese Taipei

Ya Yi Yang, En Shuo Liang, Joanna Garland, Su-Wei Hsieh, Hao-Ching Chan, Chih-Jen Ho (captain)

- Pacific Oceania

Saoirse Breen, Tarani Kamoe, Ruby Coffin, Eleanor Schuster, Mehetia Boosie, Gilles De Gouy (captain)

=== Round robin ===
#	Team	P	W	L	Matches W/L
1	China	5	5	0	13–2
2	South Korea	5	3	2	11–4
3	India	5	3	2	8–7
4	New Zealand	5	3	2	7–8
5	Chinese Taipei	5	1	4	5–9
6	Pacific Oceania	5	0	5	0–14

==== India vs. Pacific Oceania ====
India
3
Moon Island Clay Park, Changsha, China
9 April 2024
Clay

Pacific Oceania
0

			1	2	3
1	(India) (Pacific Oceania)	Rutuja Bhosale; Tarani Kamoe	6; 0	6; 0
2	(India) (Pacific Oceania)	Ankita Raina; Saoirse Breen	6; 1	6; 3
3	(India) (Pacific Oceania)	Shrivalli Rashmikaa Bhamidipaty / Prarthana Thombare; Mehetia Boosie / Ruby Coffin	6; 0	6; 1

==== South Korea vs. New Zealand ====
South Korea
3
Moon Island Clay Park, Changsha, China
9 April 2024
Clay

New Zealand
0

			1	2	3
1	(South Korea) (New Zealand)	Ku Yeon-woo; Valentina Ivanov	6; 4	6; 4
2	(South Korea) (New Zealand)	Jang Su-jeong; Lulu Sun	6; 4	6; 0
3	(South Korea) (New Zealand)	Kim Da-bin / Park So-hyun; Paige Hourigan / Erin Routliffe	6; 3	1; 6	10; 7

==== China vs. Chinese Taipei ====
China
2
Moon Island Clay Park, Changsha, China
9 April 2024
Clay

Chinese Taipei
1

			1	2	3
1	(China) (Chinese Taipei)	Wang Xinyu; Joanna Garland	7; 5	7^{7} 6^{4}
2	(China) (Chinese Taipei)	Zheng Qinwen; Yang Ya-yi	6; 0	6; 1
3	(China) (Chinese Taipei)	Guo Hanyu / Zhu Lin; Chan Hao-ching / Liang En-shuo	4; 6	2; 6

==== New Zealand vs. Pacific Oceania ====
New Zealand
3
Moon Island Clay Park, Changsha, China
10 April 2024
Clay

Pacific Oceania
0

			1	2	3
1	(New Zealand) (Pacific Oceania)	Monique Barry; Mehetia Boosie	6; 0	6; 0
2	(New Zealand) (Pacific Oceania)	Lulu Sun; Ruby Coffin	6; 0	6; 0
3	(New Zealand) (Pacific Oceania)	Paige Hourigan / Valentina Ivanov; Mehetia Boosie / Ruby Coffin	6; 0	6; 1

==== South Korea vs. Chinese Taipei ====
South Korea
3
Moon Island Clay Park, Changsha, China
10 April 2024
Clay

Chinese Taipei
0

			1	2	3
1	(South Korea) (Chinese Taipei)	Ku Yeon-woo; Liang En-shuo	6; 4	4; 6	6; 4
2	(South Korea) (Chinese Taipei)	Jang Su-jeong; Yang Ya-yi	6; 0	6; 1
3	(South Korea) (Chinese Taipei)	Kim Da-bin / Park So-hyun; Hsieh Su-wei / Yang Ya-yi	6; 3	6; 4

==== China vs. India ====
China
3
Moon Island Clay Park, Changsha, China
10 April 2024
Clay

India
0

			1	2	3
1	(China) (India)	Wang Xinyu; Sahaja Yamalapalli	6; 2	6; 3
2	(China) (India)	Zheng Qinwen; Ankita Raina	6; 0	6; 0
3	(China) (India)	Guo Hanyu / Wang Xiyu; Rutuja Bhosale / Prarthana Thombare	6; 1	6; 1

==== South Korea vs. Pacific Oceania ====
South Korea
3
Moon Island Clay Park, Changsha, China
11 April 2024
Clay

Pacific Oceania
0

			1	2	3
1	(South Korea) (Pacific Oceania)	Kim Da-bin; Mehetia Boosie	6; 0	6; 1
2	(South Korea) (Pacific Oceania)	Park So-hyun; Ruby Coffin	6; 0	6; 0
3	(South Korea) (Pacific Oceania)	Kim Da-bin / Park So-hyun; Tarani Kamoe / Eleanor Schuster	6; 2	6; 1

==== China vs. New Zealand ====
China
3
Moon Island Clay Park, Changsha, China
11 April 2024
Clay

New Zealand
0

			1	2	3
1	(China) (New Zealand)	Zhu Lin; Valentina Ivanov	6; 0	6; 1
2	(China) (New Zealand)	Wang Xiyu; Lulu Sun	6; 4	6; 0
3	(China) (New Zealand)	Guo Hanyu / Wang Xinyu; Erin Routliffe / Lulu Sun	6; 4	4; 6	14; 12

==== India vs. Chinese Taipei ====
India
2
Moon Island Clay Park, Changsha, China
11 April 2024
Clay

Chinese Taipei
1

			1	2	3
1	(India) (Chinese Taipei)	Rutuja Bhosale; Chan Hao-ching	6; 3	6; 2
2	(India) (Chinese Taipei)	Ankita Raina; Liang En-shuo	6; 2	4; 6	4; 6
3	(India) (Chinese Taipei)	Ankita Raina / Prarthana Thombare; Chan Hao-ching / Liang En-shuo	4; 6	6; 1	15; 13

==== China vs. Pacific Oceania ====
China
3
Moon Island Clay Park, Changsha, China
12 April 2024
Clay

Pacific Oceania
0

			1	2	3
1	(China) (Pacific Oceania)	Guo Hanyu; Mehetia Boosie	6; 0	6; 2
2	(China) (Pacific Oceania)	Zhu Lin; Eleanor Schuster	6; 0	6; 2
3	(China) (Pacific Oceania)	Guo Hanyu / Zhu Lin; Mehetia Boosie / Eleanor Schuster	6; 1	6; 2

==== Chinese Taipei vs. New Zealand ====
Chinese Taipei
1
Moon Island Clay Park, Changsha, China
12 April 2024
Clay

New Zealand
2

			1	2	3
1	(Chinese Taipei) (New Zealand)	Joanna Garland; Valentina Ivanov	7; 5	6; 2
2	(Chinese Taipei) (New Zealand)	Yang Ya-yi; Lulu Sun	1; 6	2; 6
3	(Chinese Taipei) (New Zealand)	Chan Hao-ching / Liang En-shuo; Paige Hourigan / Erin Routliffe	1; 6	1; 6

==== South Korea vs. India ====
South Korea
1
Moon Island Clay Park, Changsha, China
12 April 2024
Clay

India
2

			1	2	3
1	(South Korea) (India)	Park So-hyun; Rutuja Bhosale	2; 6	2; 6
2	(South Korea) (India)	Jang Su-jeong; Ankita Raina	6; 2	6; 3
3	(South Korea) (India)	Kim Da-bin / Park So-hyun; Ankita Raina / Prarthana Thombare	4; 6	4; 6

==== Chinese Taipei vs. Pacific Oceania ====
Chinese Taipei
2
Moon Island Clay Park, Changsha, China
13 April 2024
Clay

Pacific Oceania
0

			1	2	3
1	(Chinese Taipei) (Pacific Oceania)	Joanna Garland; Mehetia Boosie	6; 0	6; 0
2	(Chinese Taipei) (Pacific Oceania)	Yang Ya-yi; Eleanor Schuster	6; 2	6; 2
3	(Chinese Taipei) (Pacific Oceania)

==== China vs. South Korea ====
China
2
Moon Island Clay Park, Changsha, China
13 April 2024
Clay

South Korea
1

			1	2	3
1	(China) (South Korea)	Zhu Lin; Kim Da-bin	6; 2	6; 3
2	(China) (South Korea)	Wang Xiyu; Park So-hyun	6; 4	2; 3		retired
3	(China) (South Korea)	Guo Hanyu / Wang Xinyu; Kim Da-bin / Park So-hyun	6; 0	6; 0

==== India vs. New Zealand ====
India
1
Moon Island Clay Park, Changsha, China
13 April 2024
Clay

New Zealand
2

			1	2	3
1	(India) (New Zealand)	Rutuja Bhosale; Monique Barry	6; 2	7^{7} 6^{5}
2	(India) (New Zealand)	Ankita Raina; Lulu Sun	2; 6	0; 6
3	(India) (New Zealand)	Ankita Raina / Prarthana Thombare; Paige Hourigan / Erin Routliffe	1; 6	5; 7

=== Promotions/relegations ===
- China and South Korea were promoted to the 2024 Billie Jean King Cup play-offs.
- Chinese Taipei and Pacific Oceania were relegated to Asia/Oceania Zone Group II in 2025.

== Group II ==
- Venue: National Tennis Centre, Kuala Lumpur, Malaysia (Hard)
- Date: 15–20 July 2024

=== Participating teams ===
- Hong Kong

Eudice Chong, Hong Yi Cody Wong, Ho Ching Wu, Man Ying Maggie Ng, Justine Leong, Ling Zhang (captain)

- Indonesia

Jessy Rompies, Cylova Zuleyka Hukmasabiyya, Beatrice Gumulya, Fitriani Sabatini, Mischka Sinclaire Goenadi, Sandy Gumulya (captain)

- Iran

Meshkatolzahra Safi, Yasaman Yazdani, Mandegar Farzami, Kimia Sagheb Tehrani, Hana Soltani

- Kyrgyzstan

Vladislava Andreevskaya, Arina Solomatina, Safina Khabibrakhmanova

- Malaysia

Elsa Wan, Jo-Leen Saw, Hannah Seen Ean Yip, Hui Yii Soo, Iman Syuhada Abdullah, Jamal Mulyadi (captain)

- Mongolia

Maralgoo Chogsomjav, Martaa Chogsomjav, Sonomyanzum Enkhjargal, Ujin Batsukh, Altangerel Batjargal (captain)

- Pakistan

Ushna Suhail, Amna Ali Qayum, Soha Ali, Meheq Khokhar, Mahboob Khan (captain)

- Singapore

Sue Yan Tan, Deanne Choo Audrey Tong, Erin Lee, Sophie Ashley Chua, Daniel Heryanta Dewandaka (captain)

- Sri Lanka

Rukshika Wijesooriya, Hasali Gajaba, Dinara De Silva, Saajida Razick, Tuvini De Alwis, Dineshkanthan Thangarajah (captain)

- Thailand

Mananchaya Sawangkaew, Thasaporn Naklo, Peangtarn Plipuech, Patcharin Cheapchandej, Luksika Kumkhum, Pracharapol Khamsaman (captain)

- Uzbekistan

Daria Shubina, Sabrina Olimjanova, Maftunabonu Kahramonova, Shahnoza Marimova, Zlata Chinnova, Akgul Amanmuradova (captain)

=== Promotions/relegations ===
- Hong Kong and Thailand were promoted to the Asia/Oceania Zone Group I in 2025.
- Pakistan and Sri Lanka were relegated to Asia/Oceania Zone Group II in 2025.

== Group III ==
- Venue: Bahrain Tennis Club, Manama, Bahrain
- Date: 25–30 November 2024

Asia/Oceania Group III is split into four pools. The top team in each pool advanced to the promotional play-off round. The two winners of the two promotional play-off rounds advanced to the Asia/Oceania Zone Group II for 2025.

=== Participating teams ===
- Bahrain

Haneen Alnajjar, Jennifer Heaton, Hajar Zaidan, Amina Abdulqader, AbdulKareem Abduredha (captain)

- Bhutan

Tandin Dorji, Tsheden Tshokey, Tenzin Wangsel Lhaden, Tandin Bidha

- Brunei

Jia Hui Tan, Eunice Ying Ci Lo, Danielle Lim, Areesha Zain, Aiman Abdullah (captain)

- Guam

Fremont Gibson, Charlayne Espinosa, Leila Mercado, Amelie Helene Perez-Terlaje

- Iraq

Noora Adil, Shogher Tomasian, Lara Hasan, Zafal Khalil

- Laos

Malaylack Delilah Pathummakuronen, Phonesamai Champamanivong, Souvananh Hacnolath, Loung Heuchennekhamvongsa

- Macau

Jamie Lau, Weng Si Leong, Si Nok Ho

- Maldives

Aaraa Aasaal Azim, Layan Mohamed Shamin, Manha Mohamed Ali, Nayara Ali

- Myanmar

Htet Wai, Htay Htay Myint, Nilar Win, Thiri Zoun, Han Thu Htet

- Nepal

Abhilasha Bista, Sunira Thapa, Swastika Bista, Prakriti Shrestha, Prajna Manandhar

- Northern Mariana Islands

Carol Young Suh Lee, Maria Isabel Gvan Heras, Asia Raulerson, Hye Jin Elliott

- Philippines

Alexandra Eala, Marian Jade Capadocia, Khim Iglupas, Shaira Hope Rivera, Denise Dy (captain)

- Qatar

Mubaraka Al-Naimi, Hind Al-Mudahka, Khadija Gassama, Dana Khalifa

- Saudi Arabia

Lara Bukary, Maissane Ben Hassine, Naya El-Farouki, Daniya Alzuhair, Areej Fareh (captain)

- Tajikistan

Anisa Yakhyaeva, Saiyora Rajabalieva, Diora Akhmedova, Samira Sharipova, Anisa Urunova, Abdurasul Mukhidinov (captain)

- Turkmenistan

Ilima Guseynova, Aisha Bikbulatova, Rozhan Karajayeva, Sabrin Rahmanova, Jennet Charyyeva, Yuriy Rogusskiy (captain)

- Vietnam

Sophia Tran Ngoc Nhi Huynh, Bao Ngan Ngo, Hanh Hong Ngo, Thi Mai Linh Nguyen, Dai-Nghia Tran (captain)

=== Round-robin ===
==== Pool A ====
#	Team	P	W	L	Matches W/L
1	Northern Mariana Islands	3	3	0	8–1
2	Vietnam	3	2	1	6–3
3	Macau	3	1	2	4–5
4	Brunei	3	0	3	0–9

===== Vietnam vs. Northern Mariana Islands =====
Vietnam
1
Bahrain Tennis Club, Manama, Bahrain
26 November 2024
TBC

Northern Mariana Islands
2

			1	2	3
1	(Vietnam) (Northern Mariana Islands)	Thi Mai Linh Nguyen; Maria Isabel Gvan Heras	6; 4	7; 5
2	(Vietnam) (Northern Mariana Islands)	Sophia Tran Ngoc Nhi Huynh; Carol Young Suh Lee	0; 6	1; 6
3	(Vietnam) (Northern Mariana Islands)	Sophia Tran Ngoc Nhi Huynh / Hanh Hong Ngo; Maria Isabel Gvan Heras / Carol Young Suh Lee	4; 6	6^{2} 7^{7}

===== Brunei vs. Macau =====
Brunei
0
Bahrain Tennis Club, Manama, Bahrain
26 November 2024
TBC

Macau
3

			1	2	3
1	(Brunei) (Macau)	Eunice Ying Ci Lo; Weng Si Leong	3; 6	1; 6
2	(Brunei) (Macau)	Jia Hui Tan; Jamie Lau	2; 6	0; 6
3	(Brunei) (Macau)	Danielle Lim / Areesha Zain; Si Nok Ho / Jamie Lau	0; 6	1; 6

===== Vietnam vs. Macau =====
Vietnam
2
Bahrain Tennis Club, Manama, Bahrain
27 November 2024
TBC

Macau
1

			1	2	3
1	(Vietnam) (Macau)	Thi Mai Linh Nguyen; Weng Si Leong	6; 0	6; 1
2	(Vietnam) (Macau)	Bao Ngan Ngo; Jamie Lau	6; 2	2; 6	2; 6
3	(Vietnam) (Macau)	Sophia Tran Ngoc Nhi Huynh / Hanh Hong Ngo; Jamie Lau / Weng Si Leong	6; 3	6; 1

===== Brunei vs. Northern Mariana Islands =====
Brunei
0
Bahrain Tennis Club, Manama, Bahrain
27 November 2024
TBC

Northern Mariana Islands
3

			1	2	3
1	(Brunei) (Northern Mariana Islands)	Danielle Lim; Maria Isabel Gvan Heras	1; 6	2; 6
2	(Brunei) (Northern Mariana Islands)	Jia Hui Tan; Carol Young Suh Lee	0; 6	1; 6
3	(Brunei) (Northern Mariana Islands)	Eunice Ying Ci Lo / Areesha Zain; Hye Jin Elliott / Asia Raulerson	1; 6	2; 6

===== Vietnam vs. Brunei =====
Vietnam
3
Bahrain Tennis Club, Manama, Bahrain
29 November 2024
TBC

Brunei
0

			1	2	3
1	(Vietnam) (Brunei)	Thi Mai Linh Nguyen; Danielle Lim	6; 0	6; 1
2	(Vietnam) (Brunei)	Bao Ngan Ngo; Eunice Ying Ci Lo	6; 1	6; 1
3	(Vietnam) (Brunei)	Sophia Tran Ngoc Nhi Huynh / Hanh Hong Ngo; Jia Hui Tan / Areesha Zain	6; 0	6; 0

===== Macau vs. Northern Mariana Islands =====
Macau
0
Bahrain Tennis Club, Manama, Bahrain
29 November 2024
TBC

Northern Mariana Islands
3

			1	2	3
1	(Macau) (Northern Mariana Islands)	Weng Si Leong; Maria Isabel Gvan Heras	4; 6	6^{6} 7^{8}
2	(Macau) (Northern Mariana Islands)	Jamie Lau; Carol Young Suh Lee	1; 6	3; 6
3	(Macau) (Northern Mariana Islands)	Si Nok Ho / Jamie Lau; Hye Jin Elliott / Asia Raulerson	5; 7	4; 6

==== Pool B ====
#	Team	P	W	L	Matches W/L
1	Philippines	3	3	0	9–0
2	Nepal	3	2	1	5–4
3	Qatar	3	1	2	3–6
4	Guam	3	0	3	1–8

===== Guam vs. Philippines =====
Guam
0
Bahrain Tennis Club, Manama, Bahrain
25 November 2024
TBC

Philippines
3

			1	2	3
1	(Guam) (Philippines)	Leila Mercado; Marian Jade Capadocia	0; 6	0; 6
2	(Guam) (Philippines)	Fremont Gibson; Alexandra Eala	0; 6	0; 6
3	(Guam) (Philippines)	Charlayne Espinosa / Fremont Gibson; Khim Iglupas / Shaira Hope Rivera	0; 6	1; 6

===== Qatar vs. Nepal =====
Qatar
1
Bahrain Tennis Club, Manama, Bahrain
25 November 2024
TBC

Nepal
2

			1	2	3
1	(Qatar) (Nepal)	Hind Al-Midahka; Sunira Thapa	1; 6	2; 6
2	(Qatar) (Nepal)	Mubaraka Al-Naimi; Abhilasha Bista	6; 3	6; 2
3	(Qatar) (Nepal)	Hind Al-Mudahka / Mubaraka Al-Naimi; Abhilasha Bista / Sunira Thapa	3; 6	2; 6

===== Guam vs. Nepal =====
Guam
0
Bahrain Tennis Club, Manama, Bahrain
26 November 2024
TBC

Nepal
3

			1	2	3
1	(Guam) (Nepal)	Amelie Helene Perez-Terlaje; Sunira Thapa	0; 6	0; 6
2	(Guam) (Nepal)	Fremont Gibson; Abhilasha Bista	7^{7} 6^{3}	5; 7	2; 6
3	(Guam) (Nepal)	Charlayne Espinosa / Fremont Gibson; Swastika Bista / Prakriti Shrestha	1; 6	1; 6

===== Qatar vs. Philippines =====
Qatar
0
Bahrain Tennis Club, Manama, Bahrain
26 November 2024
TBC

Philippines
3

			1	2	3
1	(Qatar) (Philippines)	Hind Al-Mudahka; Shaira Hope Rivera	2; 6	2; 6
2	(Qatar) (Philippines)	Mubaraka Al-Naimi; Alexandra Eala	0; 6	0; 6
3	(Qatar) (Philippines)	Khadija Gassama / Dana Khalifa; Marian Jade Capadocia / Khim Iglupas	3; 6	0; 6

===== Guam vs. Qatar =====
Guam
1
Bahrain Tennis Club, Manama, Bahrain
28 November 2024
TBC

Qatar
2

			1	2	3
1	(Guam) (Qatar)	Amelie Helene Perez-Terlaje; Dana Khalifa	6^{3} 7^{7}	0; 6
2	(Guam) (Qatar)	Fremont Gibson; Hind Al-Mudahka	6; 1	6; 1
3	(Guam) (Qatar)	Fremont Gibson / Amelie Helene Perez-Terlaje; Mubaraka Al-Naimi / Khadija Gassama	1; 6	6; 3	6; 10

===== Nepal vs. Philippines =====
Nepal
0
Bahrain Tennis Club, Manama, Bahrain
28 November 2024
TBC

Philippines
3

			1	2	3
1	(Nepal) (Philippines)	Sunira Thapa; Marian Jade Capadocia	0; 6	0; 6
2	(Nepal) (Philippines)	Abhilasha Bista; Alexandra Eala	0; 6	0; 6
3	(Nepal) (Philippines)	Swastika Bista / Prajna Manandhar; Khim Iglupas / Shaira Hope Rivera	0; 6	0; 6

==== Pool C ====
#	Team	P	W	L	Matches W/L
1	Laos	3	3	0	6–3
2	Turkmenistan	3	2	1	6–3
3	Saudi Arabia	3	1	2	5–4
4	Bahrain	3	0	3	1–8

===== Laos vs. Bahrain =====
Laos
2
Bahrain Tennis Club, Manama, Bahrain
25 November 2024
TBC

Bahrain
1

			1	2	3
1	(Laos) (Bahrain)	Phonesamai Champamanivong; Hajar Zaidan	2; 6	0; 6
2	(Laos) (Bahrain)	Malaylack Delilah Pathummakuronen; Haneen Alnajjar	6; 0	6; 1
3	(Laos) (Bahrain)	Phonesamai Champamanivong / Malaylack Delilah Pathummakuronen; Jennifer Heaton / Hajar Zaidan	6; 1	6; 2

===== Turkmenistan vs. Saudi Arabia =====
Turkmenistan
2
Bahrain Tennis Club, Manama, Bahrain
25 November 2024
TBC

Saudi Arabia
1

			1	2	3
1	(Turkmenistan) (Saudi Arabia)	Aisha Bukbulatova; Daniya Alzuhair	6; 4	6; 4
2	(Turkmenistan) (Saudi Arabia)	Ilima Guseynova; Naya El-Farouki	6; 0	6; 4
3	(Turkmenistan) (Saudi Arabia)	Rozhan Karajayeva / Sabrin Rahmanova; Daniya Alzuhair / Lara Bukary	2; 6	6; 4	6; 10

===== Laos vs. Turkmenistan =====
Laos
2
Bahrain Tennis Club, Manama, Bahrain
27 November 2024
TBC

Turkmenistan
1

			1	2	3
1	(Laos) (Turkmenistan)	Souvananh Hacnolath; Aisha Bikbulatova	0; 6	0; 6
2	(Laos) (Turkmenistan)	Malaylack Delilah Pathummakuronen; Ilima Guseynova	6; 2	6; 4
3	(Laos) (Turkmenistan)	Phonesamai Champamanivong / Malaylack Delilah Pathummakuronen; Aisha Bikbulatova / Ilima Guseynova	6; 2	3; 6	10; 6

===== Saudi Arabia vs. Bahrain =====
Saudi Arabia
3
Bahrain Tennis Club, Manama, Bahrain
27 November 2024
TBC

Bahrain
0

			1	2	3
1	(Saudi Arabia) (Bahrain)	Daniya Alzuhair; Hajar Zaidan	6; 1	6; 2
2	(Saudi Arabia) (Bahrain)	Lara Bukary; Haneen Alnajjar	7^{7} 6^{1}	6; 3
3	(Saudi Arabia) (Bahrain)	Daniya Alzuhair / Naya El-Farouki; Jennifer Heaton / Hajar Zaidan	6; 3	6; 4

===== Laos vs. Saudi Arabia =====
Laos
2
Bahrain Tennis Club, Manama, Bahrain
28 November 2024
TBC

Saudi Arabia
1

			1	2	3
1	(Laos) (Saudi Arabia)	Loung Heuchennekhamvongsa; Daniya Alzuhair	0; 6	0; 6
2	(Laos) (Saudi Arabia)	Malaylack Delilah Pathummakuronen; Naya El-Farouki	6; 4	6; 2
3	(Laos) (Saudi Arabia)	Phonesamai Champamanivong / Malaylack Delilah Pathummakuronen; Daniya Alzuhair / Naya El-Farouki	6; 4	6; 4

===== Turkmenistan vs. Saudi Arabia =====
Turkmenistan
3
Bahrain Tennis Club, Manama, Bahrain
28 November 2024
TBC

Bahrain
0

			1	2	3
1	(Turkmenistan) (Bahrain)	Aisha Bukbulatova; Amina Abdulqader	6; 0	6; 0
2	(Turkmenistan) (Bahrain)	Ilima Guseynova; Hajar Zaidan	7; 5	6; 2
3	(Turkmenistan) (Bahrain)	Aisha Bikbulatova / Rozhan Karajayeva; Haneen Alnajjar / Hajar Zaidan	6; 1	6; 0

==== Pool D ====
#	Team	P	W	L	Matches W/L
1	Myanmar	4	4	0	11–1
2	Maldives	4	3	1	9–3
3	Tajikistan	4	2	2	5–7
4	Iraq	4	1	3	3–9
5	Bhutan	4	0	4	2–10

===== Maldives vs. Myanmar =====
Maldives
1
Bahrain Tennis Club, Manama, Bahrain
25 November 2024
TBC

Myanmar
2

			1	2	3
1	(Maldives) (Myanmar)	Layan Mohamed Shamin; Nilar Win	6^{1} 7^{7}	1; 6
2	(Maldives) (Myanmar)	Aaraa Aasaal Azim; Htay Htay Myint	5; 7	6; 2	6; 1
3	(Maldives) (Myanmar)	Aaraa Aasaal Azim / Layan Mohamed Shamin; Nilar Win / Thiri Zoun	4; 6	1; 6

===== Tajikistan vs. Iraq =====
Tajikistan
2
Bahrain Tennis Club, Manama, Bahrain
25 November 2024
TBC

Iraq
1

			1	2	3
1	(Tajikistan) (Iraq)	Saiyora Rajabalieva; Shogher Tomasian	6; 3	6; 3
2	(Tajikistan) (Iraq)	Anisa Yakhyaeva; Noora Adil	6; 2	6; 0
3	(Tajikistan) (Iraq)	Diora Akhmedova / Samira Sharipova; Lara Hasan / Zafal Khalil	2; 6	3; 6

===== Maldives vs. Iraq =====
Maldives
3
Bahrain Tennis Club, Manama, Bahrain
26 November 2024
TBC

Iraq
0

			1	2	3
1	(Maldives) (Iraq)	Layan Mohamed Shamin; Zafal Khalil	6; 0	6; 3
2	(Maldives) (Iraq)	Aaraa Aasaal Azim; Shogher Tomasian	6; 2	6; 1
3	(Maldives) (Iraq)	Nayara Ali / Aaraa Aasaal Azim; Lara Hasan / Zafal Khalil	6; 2	6; 0

===== Tajikistan vs. Bhutan =====
Tajikistan
2
Bahrain Tennis Club, Manama, Bahrain
26 November 2024
TBC

Bhutan
1

			1	2	3
1	(Tajikistan) (Bhutan)	Saiyora Rajabalieva; Tsheden Tshokey	6; 2	7^{7} 6^{2}
2	(Tajikistan) (Bhutan)	Anisa Yakhyaeva; Tandin Dorji	6; 2	6; 0
3	(Tajikistan) (Bhutan)	Samira Sharipova / Anisa Urunova; Tandin Bidha / Tenzin Wangsel Lhaden	1; 6	0; 6

===== Maldives vs. Bhutan =====
Maldives
3
Bahrain Tennis Club, Manama, Bahrain
27 November 2024
TBC

Bhutan
0

			1	2	3
1	(Maldives) (Bhutan)	Layan Mohamed Shamin; Tsheden Tshokey	6; 2	6; 1
2	(Maldives) (Bhutan)	Aaraa Aasaal Azim; Tandin Dorji	6; 3	6; 0
3	(Maldives) (Bhutan)	Nayara Ali / Manha Mohamed Ali; Tandin Dorji / Tsheden Tshokey	7; 5	6; 2

===== Iraq vs. Myanmar =====
Iraq
0
Bahrain Tennis Club, Manama, Bahrain
27 November 2024
TBC

Myanmar
3

			1	2	3
1	(Iraq) (Myanmar)	Zafal Khalil; Nilar Win	0; 6	1; 6
2	(Iraq) (Myanmar)	Shogher Tomasian; Htay Htay Myint	1; 6	1; 6
3	(Iraq) (Myanmar)	Zafal Khalil / Shogher Tomasian; Htet Wai / Thiri Zoun	0; 6	0; 6

===== Maldives vs. Tajikistan =====
Maldives
2
Bahrain Tennis Club, Manama, Bahrain
28 November 2024
TBC

Tajikistan
1

			1	2	3
1	(Maldives) (Tajikistan)	Layan Mohamed Shamin; Saiyora Rajabalieva	3; 6	6; 2	4; 6
2	(Maldives) (Tajikistan)	Aaraa Aasaal Azim; Anisa Yakhyaeva	6; 1	6; 0
3	(Maldives) (Tajikistan)	Nayara Ali / Aaraa Aasaal Azim; Saiyora Rajabalieva / Anisa Yakhyaeva	6; 3	6; 1

===== Bhutan vs. Myanmar =====
Bhutan
0
Bahrain Tennis Club, Manama, Bahrain
28 November 2024
TBC

Myanmar
3

			1	2	3
1	(Bhutan) (Myanmar)	Tsheden Tshokey; Nilar Win	0; 6	0; 6
2	(Bhutan) (Myanmar)	Tandin Dorji; Htet Wai	3; 6	0; 6
3	(Bhutan) (Myanmar)	Tandin Bidha / Tenzin Wangsel Lhaden; Han Thu Htet / Htay Htay Myint	0; 6	0; 6

===== Tajikistan vs. Myanmar =====
Tajikistan
0
Bahrain Tennis Club, Manama, Bahrain
29 November 2024
TBC

Myanmar
3

			1	2	3
1	(Tajikistan) (Myanmar)	Anisa Urunova; Nilar Win	0; 6	0; 6
2	(Tajikistan) (Myanmar)	Samira Sharipova; Htay Htay Myint	1; 6	1; 6
3	(Tajikistan) (Myanmar)	Samira Sharipova / Anisa Urunova; Han Thu Htet / Htet Wai	0; 6	0; 6

===== Bhutan vs. Iraq =====
Bhutan
1
Bahrain Tennis Club, Manama, Bahrain
29 November 2024
TBC

Iraq
2

			1	2	3
1	(Bhutan) (Iraq)	Tenzin Wangsel Lhaden; Zafal Khalil	5; 7	0; 6
2	(Bhutan) (Iraq)	Tandin Dorji; Shogher Tomasian	6; 4	6; 2
3	(Bhutan) (Iraq)	Tandin Bidha / Tsheden Tshokey; Lara Hasan / Zafal Khalil	6; 4	3; 6	7; 10

=== Promotion Play-offs ===
==== Northern Mariana Islands vs. Myanmar ====
Northern Mariana Islands
2
Bahrain Tennis Club, Manama, Bahrain
30 November 2024
TBC

Myanmar
1

			1	2	3
1	(Northern Mariana Islands) (Myanmar)	Maria Isabel Gvan Heras; Nilar Win	3; 6	2; 6
2	(Northern Mariana Islands) (Myanmar)	Carol Young Suh Lee; Htay Htay Myint	6; 0	6; 0
3	(Northern Mariana Islands) (Myanmar)	Maria Isabel Gvan Heras / Carol Young Suh Lee; Nilar Win / Thiri Zoun	6; 1	6; 3

==== Philippines vs. Laos ====
Philippines
2
Bahrain Tennis Club, Manama, Bahrain
30 November 2024
TBC

Laos
0

			1	2	3
1	(Philippines) (Laos)	Marian Jade Capadocia; Phonesamai Champamanivong	6; 0	6; 0
2	(Philippines) (Laos)	Alexandra Eala; Malaylack Delilah Pathummakuronen	6; 1	6; 1
3	(Philippines) (Laos)	Khim Iglupas / Shaira Hope Rivera; Phonesamai Champamanivong / Malaylack Delilah Pathummakuronen				not played

=== 5th to 6th Play-off ===
==== Vietnam vs. Maldives ====
Vietnam
2
Bahrain Tennis Club, Manama, Bahrain
30 November 2024
TBC

Maldives
1

			1	2	3
1	(Vietnam) (Maldives)	Thi Mai Linh Nguyen; Nayara Ali	6; 0	6; 2
2	(Vietnam) (Maldives)	Hanh Hong Ngo; Aaraa Aasaal Azim	3; 6	3; 6
3	(Vietnam) (Maldives)	Sophia Tran Ngoc Nhi Huynh / Hanh Hong Ngo; Nayara Ali / Aaraa Aasaal Azim	6; 2	6; 1

=== 7th to 8th Play-off ===
==== Nepal vs. Turkmenistan ====
Nepal
2
Bahrain Tennis Club, Manama, Bahrain
30 November 2024
TBC

Turkmenistan
1

			1	2	3
1	(Nepal) (Turkmenistan)	Sunira Thapa; Sabrin Rahmanova	6; 0	6; 2
2	(Nepal) (Turkmenistan)	Abhilasha Bista; Aisha Bikbulatova	6^{2} 7^{7}	2; 6
3	(Nepal) (Turkmenistan)	Abhilasha Bista / Sunira Thapa; Aisha Bikbulatova / Rozhan Karajayeva	7^{7} 6^{4}	6; 2

=== 9th to 10th Play-off ===
==== Qatar vs. Saudi Arabia ====
Qatar
1
Bahrain Tennis Club, Manama, Bahrain
29 November 2024
TBC

Saudi Arabia
2

			1	2	3
1	(Qatar) (Saudi Arabia)	Dana Khalifa; Naya El-Farouki	6^{5} 7^{7}	6; 0	2; 6
2	(Qatar) (Saudi Arabia)	Khadija Gassama; Lara Bukary	6; 0	6; 0
3	(Qatar) (Saudi Arabia)	Hind Al-Mudahka / Khadija Gassama; Daniya Alzuhair / Naya El-Farouki	3; 6	3; 6

=== 11th to 12th Play-off ===
==== Macau vs Tajikistan ====
Macau 0	Bahrain Tennis Club, Manama, Bahrain; 30 November 2024	Tajikistan 0
not played

=== 13th to 14th Play-off ===
==== Bahrain vs. Guam ====
Bahrain
0
Bahrain Tennis Club, Manama, Bahrain
29 November 2024
TBC

Guam
3

			1	2	3
1	(Bahrain) (Guam)	Amina Abdulqader; Amelie Helene Perez-Terlaje	1; 6	0; 6
2	(Bahrain) (Guam)	Hajar Zaidan; Fremont Gibson	2; 6	1; 6
3	(Bahrain) (Guam)	Haneen Alnajjar / Jennifer Heaton; Charlayne Espinosa / Amelie Helene Perez-Terlaje	4; 6	4; 6

=== 15th to 16th Play-off ===
==== Brunei vs. Iraq ====
Brunei 0	Bahrain Tennis Club, Manama, Bahrain; 30 November 2024	Iraq 0
not played

=== Promotions ===
- Philippines and Northern Mariana Islands were promoted to Asia/Oceania Zone Group II in 2025.
