= 2026 Billie Jean King Cup Asia/Oceania Zone =

Subsection of tennis competition

The Asia/Oceania Zone is one of three zones of regional competition in the 2026 Billie Jean King Cup.

== Group I ==
- Date: 7–11 April 2026
- Venue: DLTA Stadium, New Delhi, India
- Surface: Hard

One single round robin - top two nations promoted to 2026 Billie Jean King Cup Play-offs in November, while the bottom two was relegated to Asia/Oceania Group II in 2027.

=== Participating teams ===
#: Nations Ranking as of 17 November 2025.

- India (#28)
- Indonesia (#41)
- Mongolia (#45)
- New Zealand (#31)
- South Korea (#35)
- Thailand (#32)

=== Main draw ===
Pos.	Country	Ties W–L	Matches W–L	Sets W–L
1	Thailand	4–1	10–5	20–12
2	Indonesia	4–1	11–4	24–9
3	India	3–2	9–6	20–12
4	South Korea	3–2	11–4	22–10
5	New Zealand	1–4	4–11	10–23
6	Mongolia	0–5	0–15	0–30

==== India vs Thailand ====
India
1
DLTA Stadium, New Delhi, India
7–8 April 2026
Hard

Thailand
2

			1	2	3
1	(India) (Thailand)	Vaishnavi Adkar; Anchisa Chanta	1; 6	3; 6
2	(India) (Thailand)	Sahaja Yamalapalli; Patcharin Cheapchandej	4; 6	6; 1	4; 6
3	(India) (Thailand)	Rutuja Bhosale / Ankita Raina; Thasaporn Naklo / Peangtarn Plipuech	6; 3	6; 4

==== New Zealand vs Indonesia ====
New Zealand
1
DLTA Stadium, New Delhi, India
7–8 April 2026
Hard

Indonesia
2

			1	2	3
1	(New Zealand) (Indonesia)	Aishi Das; Priska Madelyn Nugroho	4; 6	1; 6
2	(New Zealand) (Indonesia)	Monique Barry; Janice Tjen	3; 6	1; 6
3	(New Zealand) (Indonesia)	Monique Barry / Valentina Ivanov; Anjali Kirana Junarto / Aldila Sutjiadi	4; 6	6; 0	10; 6

==== South Korea vs Mongolia ====
South Korea
3
DLTA Stadium, New Delhi, India
7 April 2026
Hard

Mongolia
0

			1	2	3
1	(South Korea) (Mongolia)	Back Da-yeon; Khongorzul Aldarkhishig	6; 0	6; 0
2	(South Korea) (Mongolia)	Park So-hyun; Jargal Altansarnai	6; 0	6; 0
3	(South Korea) (Mongolia)	Jeong Bo-young / Lee Eun-hye; Khongorzul Aldarkhishig / Anu-Vjin Gantor	6; 0	6; 0

==== India vs New Zealand ====
India
3
DLTA Stadium, New Delhi, India
8 April 2026
Hard

New Zealand
0

			1	2	3
1	(India) (New Zealand)	Vaishnavi Adkar; Aishi Das	6; 2	6; 4
2	(India) (New Zealand)	Sahaja Yamalapalli; Valentina Ivanov	6; 1	6; 3
3	(India) (New Zealand)	Rutuja Bhosale / Ankita Raina; Monique Barry / Erin Routliffe	6; 4	6; 2

==== Thailand vs South Korea ====
Thailand
0
DLTA Stadium, New Delhi, India
8 April 2026
Hard

South Korea
3

			1	2	3
1	(Thailand) (South Korea)	Anchisa Chanta; Back Da-yeon	3; 6	4; 6
2	(Thailand) (South Korea)	Patcharin Cheapchandej; Park So-hyun	4; 6	1; 6
3	(Thailand) (South Korea)	Thasaporn Naklo / Kamonwan Yodpetch; Back Da-yeon / Lee Eun-hye	4; 6	6^{4} 7^{7}

==== Indonesia vs Mongolia ====
Indonesia
3
DLTA Stadium, New Delhi, India
8 April 2026
Hard

Mongolia
0

			1	2	3
1	(Indonesia) (Mongolia)	Aldila Sutjiadi; Anu-Vjin Gantor	6; 0	6; 0
2	(Indonesia) (Mongolia)	Anjali Kirana Junarto; Khongorzul Aldarkhishig	6; 2	6; 0
3	(Indonesia) (Mongolia)	Anjali Kirana Junarto / Meydiana Laviola Reinnamah; Jargal Altansarnai / Oyungerel Khasbaatar	6; 0	6; 0

==== India vs Indonesia ====
India
0
DLTA Stadium, New Delhi, India
9 April 2026
Hard

Indonesia
3

			1	2	3
1	(India) (Indonesia)	Vaishnavi Adkar; Priska Madelyn Nugroho	7^{7} 6^{3}	6^{3} 7^{7}	3; 6
2	(India) (Indonesia)	Sahaja Yamalapalli; Janice Tjen	2; 6	1; 6
3	(India) (Indonesia)	Rutuja Bhosale / Ankita Raina; Aldila Sutjiadi / Janice Tjen	3; 6	6^{4} 7^{7}

==== New Zealand vs South Korea ====
New Zealand
0
DLTA Stadium, New Delhi, India
9 April 2026
Hard

South Korea
3

			1	2	3
1	(New Zealand) (South Korea)	Valentina Ivanov; Back Da-yeon	5; 7	3; 6
2	(New Zealand) (South Korea)	Monique Barry; Park So-hyun	0; 6	1; 6
3	(New Zealand) (South Korea)	Aishi Das / Valentina Ivanov; Back Da-yeon / Lee Eun-hye	3; 6	6; 3	8; 10

==== Thailand vs Mongolia ====
Thailand
3
DLTA Stadium, New Delhi, India
9 April 2026
Hard

Mongolia
0

			1	2	3
1	(Thailand) (Mongolia)	Thasaporn Naklo; Anu-Vjin Gantor	6; 1	6; 0
2	(Thailand) (Mongolia)	Patcharin Cheapchandej; Khongorzul Aldarkhishig	6; 1	6; 0
3	(Thailand) (Mongolia)	Peangtarn Plipuech / Kamonwan Yodpetch; Jargal Altansarnai / Oyungerel Khasbaatar	6; 0	6; 0

==== India vs Mongolia ====
India
3
DLTA Stadium, New Delhi, India
10 April 2026
Hard

Mongolia
0

			1	2	3
1	(India) (Mongolia)	Zeel Desai; Anu-Vjin Gantor	6; 0	6; 0
2	(India) (Mongolia)	Sahaja Yamalapalli; Jargal Altansarnai	6; 0	6; 0
3	(India) (Mongolia)	Vaishnavi Adkar / Rutuja Bhosale; Khongorzul Aldarkhishig / Jargal Altansarnai	6; 1	6; 0

==== New Zealand vs Thailand ====
New Zealand
0
DLTA Stadium, New Delhi, India
10 April 2026
Hard

Thailand
3

			1	2	3
1	(New Zealand) (Thailand)	Aishi Das; Anchisa Chanta	2; 6	3; 6
2	(New Zealand) (Thailand)	Valentina Ivanov; Patcharin Cheapchandej	2; 6	6; 3	5; 7
3	(New Zealand) (Thailand)	Monique Barry / Aishi Das; Thasaporn Naklo / Kamonwan Yodpetch	4; 6	1; 6

==== South Korea vs Indonesia ====
South Korea
1
DLTA Stadium, New Delhi, India
10 April 2026
Hard

Indonesia
2

			1	2	3
1	(South Korea) (Indonesia)	Back Da-yeon; Priska Madelyn Nugroho	7; 5	3; 6	6; 2
2	(South Korea) (Indonesia)	Lee Eun-hye; Janice Tjen	2; 6	2; 6
3	(South Korea) (Indonesia)	Jeong Bo-young / Lee Eun-hye; Aldila Sutjiadi / Janice Tjen	4; 6	3; 6

==== India vs South Korea ====
India
2
DLTA Stadium, New Delhi, India
11 April 2026
Hard

South Korea
1

			1	2	3
1	(India) (South Korea)	Ankita Raina; Back Da-yeon	1; 6	5; 7
2	(India) (South Korea)	Vaishnavi Adkar; Park So-hyun	7^{7} 6^{2}	7^{7} 6^{5}
3	(India) (South Korea)	Rutuja Bhosale / Ankita Raina; Back Da-yeon / Lee Eun-hye	6; 2	6; 2

==== New Zealand vs Mongolia ====
New Zealand
3
DLTA Stadium, New Delhi, India
11 April 2026
Hard

Mongolia
0

			1	2	3
1	(New Zealand) (Mongolia)	Aishi Das; Khongorzul Aldarkhishigr	6; 0	6; 1
2	(New Zealand) (Mongolia)	Monique Barry; Jargal Altansarnai	6; 1	6; 2
3	(New Zealand) (Mongolia)	Aishi Das / Erin Routliffe; Jargal Altansarnai / Anu-Vjin Gantor	6; 1	6; 2

==== Thailand vs Indonesia ====
Thailand
2
DLTA Stadium, New Delhi, India
11 April 2026
Hard

Indonesia
1

			1	2	3
1	(Thailand) (Indonesia)	Thasaporn Naklo; Priska Madelyn Nugroho	2; 3			retired
2	(Thailand) (Indonesia)	Anchisa Chanta; Janice Tjen	2; 6	4; 6
3	(Thailand) (Indonesia)	Anchisa Chanta / Patcharin Cheapchandej; Anjali Kirana Junarto / Meydiana Laviola Reinnamah	6; 2	6; 4

=== Promotions/Relegations ===
- Indonesia and Thailand advanced to the 2026 Billie Jean King Cup play-offs.
- Mongolia and New Zealand were relegated to Asia/Oceania Zone Group II in 2027.

== Group II ==
Date: 15–20 June 2026
Venue: National Tennis Centre, Kuala Lumpur, Malaysia

Participating teams

- Chinese Taipei
- Hong Kong
- Kyrgyzstan
- Laos
- Malaysia
- Pacific Oceania
- Philippines
- Singapore
- Sri Lanka
- Uzbekistan

=== Promotions/Relegations ===
- Hong Kong and Philippines were promoted to Asia/Oceania Zone Group I in 2027.
- Kyrgyzstan and Laos were relegated to Asia/Oceania Zone Group III in 2027.

== Group III ==
Date:
Venue:

Participating teams

- Bahrain
- Brunei
- Guam
- Iran
- Jordan
- Maldives
- Myanmar
- Nepal
- Northern Mariana Islands
- Pakistan
- Qatar
- Tajikistan
- Turkmenistan
- Vietnam

Inactive teams

- Bangladesh
- Bhutan
- Iraq
- Lebanon
- Macau
- Oman
- Saudi Arabia
- Syria

=== Promotions ===
- To Be Determined and To Be Determined were promoted to Asia/Oceania Zone Group II in 2027.
