= 2025 Billie Jean King Cup Asia/Oceania Zone =

Subsection of tennis competition

The Asia/Oceania Zone is one of three zones of regional competition in the 2025 Billie Jean King Cup.

== Group I ==
- Date: 8–12 April 2025
- Venue: MSLTA School of Tennis, Pune, India (Hard)

One round-robin pool of six teams, with the top two teams promoted to the Play-offs in November 2025, while the bottom two teams are relegated to Asia/Oceania Group II in 2026.

=== Participating teams ===
- Chinese Taipei

Joanna Garland, Lee Ya-hsuan, Cho Yi-tsen, Lin Fang-an, Wu Fang-hsien, Lin Yu-chou (captain)

- Hong Kong

Cody Wong, Eudice Chong, Wu Ho-ching, Maggie Ng, Justine Leong, Zhang Ling (captain)

- India

Ankita Raina, Sahaja Yamalapalli, Shrivalli Bhamidipaty, Vaidehi Chaudhari, Prarthana Thombare, Vishal Uppal (captain)

- New Zealand

Lulu Sun, Monique Barry, Aishi Das, Sasha Situe, Renee Zhang, Matt Hair (captain)

- South Korea

Park So-hyun, Back Da-yeon, Lee Eun-hye, Kim Da-bin, Jeong Bo-young, Cho Yoon-jeong (captain)

- Thailand

Mananchaya Sawangkaew, Lanlana Tararudee, Thasaporn Naklo, Patcharin Cheapchandej, Peangtarn Plipuech, Patcharapol Khamsaman (captain)

=== Main Draw ===
| # | Team | P | W | L | Matches W-L | Sets W-L |
|---|---|---|---|---|---|---|
| 1 | New Zealand | 5 | 4 | 1 | 9–6 | 18–17 |
| 2 | India | 5 | 4 | 1 | 9–6 | 21–16 |
| 3 | Thailand | 5 | 3 | 2 | 9–6 | 22–15 |
| 4 | South Korea | 5 | 2 | 3 | 9–6 | 21–15 |
| 5 | Hong Kong | 5 | 2 | 3 | 5–10 | 13–22 |
| 6 | Chinese Taipei | 5 | 0 | 5 | 4–11 | 14–24 |

==== India vs New Zealand ====
India
1
MSLTA School of Tennis, Pune, India
8 April 2025
Hard

New Zealand
2

| | | | 1 | 2 | 3 |
|---|---|---|---|---|---|
| 1 | (India) (New Zealand) | Shrivalli Bhamidipaty; Aishi Das | 6; 1 | 6; 1 |
| 2 | (India) (New Zealand) | Sahaja Yamalapalli; Lulu Sun | 3; 6 | 3; 6 |
| 3 | (India) (New Zealand) | Ankita Raina / Prarthana Thombare; Monique Barry / Lulu Sun | 3; 6 | 4; 6 |

==== Thailand vs Hong Kong ====
Thailand
3
MSLTA School of Tennis, Pune, India
8 April 2025
Hard

Hong Kong
0

| | | | 1 | 2 | 3 |
|---|---|---|---|---|---|
| 1 | (Thailand) (Hong Kong) | Lanlana Tararudee; Wu Ho-ching | 6; 1 | 6; 4 |
| 2 | (Thailand) (Hong Kong) | Mananchaya Sawangkaew; Cody Wong | 3; 6 | 6; 2 | 6; 1 |
| 3 | (Thailand) (Hong Kong) | Patcharin Cheapchandej / Peangtarn Plipuech; Maggie Ng / Cody Wong | 6; 3 | 6; 4 |

==== South Korea vs Chinese Taipei ====
South Korea
3
MSLTA School of Tennis, Pune, India
8 April 2025
Hard

Chinese Taipei
0

| | | | 1 | 2 | 3 |
|---|---|---|---|---|---|
| 1 | (South Korea) (Chinese Taipei) | Park So-hyun; Lee Ya-hsuan | 6; 1 | 6; 3 |
| 2 | (South Korea) (Chinese Taipei) | Back Da-yeon; Joanna Garland | 6; 4 | 2; 6 | 6; 4 |
| 3 | (South Korea) (Chinese Taipei) | Kim Da-bin / Lee Eun-hye; Wu Fang-hsien / Cho Yi-tsen | 7^{7} 6^{3} | 3; 6 | 10; 8 |

==== India vs Thailand ====
India
2
MSLTA School of Tennis, Pune, India
9 April 2025
Hard

Thailand
1

| | | | 1 | 2 | 3 |
|---|---|---|---|---|---|---|
| 1 | (India) (Thailand) | Shrivalli Bhamidipaty; Lanlana Tararudee | 6; 2 | 6; 4 |
| 2 | (India) (Thailand) | Sahaja Yamalapalli; Mananchaya Sawangkaew | 3; 6 | 7^{7} 6^{3} | 0; 1 | retired |
| 3 | (India) (Thailand) | Ankita Raina / Prarthana Thombare; Patcharin Cheapchandej / Peangtarn Plipuech | 7^{7} 6^{3} | 3; 6 | 10; 3 |

==== South Korea vs New Zealand ====
South Korea
1
MSLTA School of Tennis, Pune, India
9 April 2025
Hard

New Zealand
2

| | | | 1 | 2 | 3 |
|---|---|---|---|---|---|
| 1 | (South Korea) (New Zealand) | Park So-hyun; Renee Zhang | 6; 1 | 6; 0 |
| 2 | (South Korea) (New Zealand) | Back Da-yeon; Lulu Sun | 4; 6 | 1; 6 |
| 3 | (South Korea) (New Zealand) | Kim Da-bin / Lee Eun-hye; Monique Barry / Lulu Sun | 3; 6 | 6; 4 | 8; 10 |

==== Chinese Taipei vs Hong Kong ====
Chinese Taipei
1
MSLTA School of Tennis, Pune, India
9 April 2025
Hard

Hong Kong
2

| | | | 1 | 2 | 3 |
|---|---|---|---|---|---|
| 1 | (Chinese Taipei) (Hong Kong) | Lee Ya-hsuan; Wu Ho-ching | 5; 7 | 3; 6 |
| 2 | (Chinese Taipei) (Hong Kong) | Joanna Garland; Cody Wong | 6; 4 | 6; 3 |
| 3 | (Chinese Taipei) (Hong Kong) | Wu Fang-hsien / Cho Yi-tsen; Eudice Chong / Cody Wong | 7^{7} 6^{5} | 6^{6} 7^{8} | 7; 10 |

==== India vs Hong Kong ====
India
2
MSLTA School of Tennis, Pune, India
10 April 2025
Hard

Hong Kong
1

| | | | 1 | 2 | 3 |
|---|---|---|---|---|---|
| 1 | (India) (Hong Kong) | Vaidehi Chaudhari; Wu Ho-ching | 7^{10} 6^{8} | 6; 1 |
| 2 | (India) (Hong Kong) | Shrivalli Bhamidipaty; Cody Wong | 7^{8} 6^{6} | 2; 6 | 6; 3 |
| 3 | (India) (Hong Kong) | Ankita Raina / Prarthana Thombare; Eudice Chong / Cody Wong | 7^{7} 6^{2} | 3; 6 | 11; 13 |

==== South Korea vs Thailand ====
South Korea
1
MSLTA School of Tennis, Pune, India
10 April 2025
Hard

Thailand
2

| | | | 1 | 2 | 3 |
|---|---|---|---|---|---|
| 1 | (South Korea) (Thailand) | Park So-hyun; Lanlana Tararudee | 6; 4 | 1; 6 | 7; 5 |
| 2 | (South Korea) (Thailand) | Back Da-yeon; Mananchaya Sawangkaew | 4; 6 | 2; 6 |
| 3 | (South Korea) (Thailand) | Kim Da-bin / Lee Eun-hye; Patcharin Cheapchandej / Peangtarn Plipuech | 2; 6 | 6; 2 | 7; 10 |

==== New Zealand vs Chinese Taipei ====
New Zealand
2
MSLTA School of Tennis, Pune, India
10 April 2025
Hard

Chinese Taipei
1

| | | | 1 | 2 | 3 |
|---|---|---|---|---|---|
| 1 | (New Zealand) (Chinese Taipei) | Monique Barry; Lin Fang-an | 5; 7 | 7^{7} 6^{5} | 7^{7} 6^{2} |
| 2 | (New Zealand) (Chinese Taipei) | Lulu Sun; Joanna Garland | 3; 6 | 6; 3 | 6; 4 |
| 3 | (New Zealand) (Chinese Taipei) | Aishi Das / Sasha Situe; Wu Fang-hsien / Cho Yi-tsen | 0; 6 | 1; 6 |

==== India vs Chinese Taipei ====
India
2
MSLTA School of Tennis, Pune, India
11 April 2025
Hard

Chinese Taipei
1

| | | | 1 | 2 | 3 |
|---|---|---|---|---|---|
| 1 | (India) (Chinese Taipei) | Vaidehi Chaudhari; Lin Fang-an | 6; 2 | 5; 7 | 6; 4 |
| 2 | (India) (Chinese Taipei) | Shrivalli Bhamidipaty; Joanna Garland | 6; 2 | 7^{7} 6^{3} |
| 3 | (India) (Chinese Taipei) | Ankita Raina / Prarthana Thombare; Wu Fang-hsien / Cho Yi-tsen | 2; 6 | 6; 4 | 6; 10 |

==== Thailand vs New Zealand ====
Thailand
1
MSLTA School of Tennis, Pune, India
11 April 2025
Hard

New Zealand
2

| | | | 1 | 2 | 3 |
|---|---|---|---|---|---|
| 1 | (Thailand) (New Zealand) | Patcharin Cheapchandej; Monique Barry | 5; 7 | 2; 6 |
| 2 | (Thailand) (New Zealand) | Mananchaya Sawangkaew; Lulu Sun | 4; 6 | 6; 3 | 3; 6 |
| 3 | (Thailand) (New Zealand) | Thasaporn Naklo / Peangtarn Plipuech; Renee Zhang / Sasha Situe | 6; 3 | 6; 3 |

==== South Korea vs Hong Kong ====
South Korea
3
MSLTA School of Tennis, Pune, India
11 April 2025
Hard

Hong Kong
0

| | | | 1 | 2 | 3 |
|---|---|---|---|---|---|
| 1 | (South Korea) (Hong Kong) | Park So-hyun; Wu Ho-ching | 6; 1 | 6; 1 |
| 2 | (South Korea) (Hong Kong) | Back Da-yeon; Cody Wong | 6; 3 | 7; 5 |
| 3 | (South Korea) (Hong Kong) | Kim Da-bin / Park So-hyun; Eudice Chong / Maggie Ng | 6; 4 | 6; 1 |

==== India vs South Korea ====
India
2
MSLTA School of Tennis, Pune, India
12 April 2025
Hard

South Korea
1

| | | | 1 | 2 | 3 |
|---|---|---|---|---|---|
| 1 | (India) (South Korea) | Shrivalli Bhamidipaty; Park So-hyun | 5; 7 | 6; 3 | 7^{7} 6^{5} |
| 2 | (India) (South Korea) | Sahaja Yamalapalli; Back Da-yeon | 3; 6 | 4; 6 |
| 3 | (India) (South Korea) | Ankita Raina / Prarthana Thombare; Park So-hyun / Kim Da-bin | 6; 4 | 6; 3 |

==== Thailand vs Chinese Taipei ====
Thailand
2
MSLTA School of Tennis, Pune, India
12 April 2025
Hard

Chinese Taipei
1

| | | | 1 | 2 | 3 |
|---|---|---|---|---|---|
| 1 | (Thailand) (Chinese Taipei) | Lanlana Tararudee; Lin Fang-an | 6; 3 | 6; 3 |
| 2 | (Thailand) (Chinese Taipei) | Mananchaya Sawangkaew; Joanna Garland | 6; 4 | 5; 7 | 2; 6 |
| 3 | (Thailand) (Chinese Taipei) | Patcharin Cheapchandej / Peangtarn Plipuech; Cho Yi-tsen / Lin Fang-an | 6; 1 | 6; 2 |

==== New Zealand vs Hong Kong ====
New Zealand
1
MSLTA School of Tennis, Pune, India
12 April 2025
Hard

Hong Kong
2

| | | | 1 | 2 | 3 |
|---|---|---|---|---|---|
| 1 | (New Zealand) (Hong Kong) | Sasha Situe; Maggie Ng | 2; 6 | 3; 6 |
| 2 | (New Zealand) (Hong Kong) | Aishi Das; Eudice Chong | 2; 6 | 6; 0 | 6; 4 |
| 3 | (New Zealand) (Hong Kong) | Monique Barry / Aishi Das; Eudice Chong / Cody Wong | 0; 6 | 2; 6 |

=== Promotions/Relegations ===
- India and New Zealand were promoted to the 2025 Billie Jean King Cup play-offs.
- Chinese Taipei and Hong Kong were relegated to Asia/Oceania Zone Group II in 2026.

== Group II ==
- Date: 16–22 June 2025
- Venue: National Tennis Centre, Kuala Lumpur, Malaysia (Hard)

Two round-robin pools of five (Pool A, Pool B), followed by the top two nations in each pool facing each other in the promotional play-offs (A1 v B2, B1 v A2). The two winners of those play-offs will be promoted to Asia/Oceania Group I in 2026.

The bottom nation in each group (A5, B5) will be relegated to Asia/Oceania Group III next year.

=== Participating teams ===
- Indonesia

Cylova Zuleyka Hukmasabiyya, Mischka Sinclaire Goenadi, Anjali Kirana Junarto, Meydiana Laviola Reinnamah, Andi Rivali (captain)

- Iran

Meshkatolzahra Safi, Kimia Sagheb Tehrani, Mandegar Farzami, Yasaman Yazdani, Mona Noorian (captain)

- Kyrgyzstan

Safina Khabibrakhmanova, Sezim Sagynbaeva, Erica Ismailova, Vladislava Andreevskaya (captain)

- Malaysia

Jo-Leen Saw, Elsa Wan, Zan Ning Lim, Iman Syuhada Abdullah, Hannah Seen Ean Yip, Hao Sheng (captain)

- Mongolia

Maralgoo Chogsomjav, Martaa Chogsomjav, Ujin Batsukh, Sonomyanzum Enkhjargal, Yesugen Ganbaatar, Altangerel Batjargal (captain)

- Northern Mariana Islands

Anne Lee, Irin Chung, Hannah Chae, Serin Chung, Jeff Race (captain)

- Pacific Oceania

Carolann Delaunay, Violet Apisah, Patricia Apisah, Litia Godinet, Cyril Jacobe (captain)

- Philippines

Alexa Joy Milliam, Shaira Hope Rivera, Tennielle Madis, Stefi Marithe Aludo, Denise Dy (captain)

- Singapore

Eva Marie Desvignes, Audrey Tong, Sophie Ashley Chua, Erin Lee, Kai Ning Chanya Ng, Daniel Heryanta (captain)

- Uzbekistan

Nigina Abduraimova, Sabrina Olimjanova, Daria Shubina, Zlata Chinnova, Nigina Alimova, Akgul Amanmuradova (captain)

=== Pool A ===
| # | Team | P | W | L | Matches W-L | Sets W-L |
|---|---|---|---|---|---|---|
| 1 | Mongolia | 4 | 3 | 1 | 10–2 | 21–7 |
| 2 | Malaysia | 4 | 3 | 1 | 8–4 | 17–8 |
| 3 | Kyrgyzstan | 4 | 3 | 1 | 8–4 | 17–9 |
| 4 | Singapore | 4 | 1 | 3 | 4–8 | 9–16 |
| 5 | Northern Mariana Islands | 4 | 0 | 4 | 0–12 | 0–24 |

==== Mongolia vs Northern Mariana Islands ====
Mongolia
3
National Tennis Centre, Kuala Lumpur, Malaysia
16 June 2025
Hard

Northern Mariana Islands
0

| | | | 1 | 2 | 3 |
|---|---|---|---|---|---|
| 1 | (Mongolia) (Northern Mariana Islands) | Martaa Chogsomjav; Irin Chung | 6; 1 | 6; 0 |
| 2 | (Mongolia) (Northern Mariana Islands) | Maralgoo Chogsomjav; Anne Lee | 6; 0 | 6; 0 |
| 3 | (Mongolia) (Northern Mariana Islands) | Ujin Batsukh / Martaa Chogsomjav; Hannah Chae / Serin Chung | 6; 0 | 6; 0 |

==== Malaysia vs Kyrgyzstan ====
Malaysia
2
National Tennis Centre, Kuala Lumpur, Malaysia
16 June 2025
Hard

Kyrgyzstan
1

| | | | 1 | 2 | 3 |
|---|---|---|---|---|---|
| 1 | (Malaysia) (Kyrgyzstan) | Elsa Wan; Safina Khabibrakhmanova | 6; 3 | 6; 2 |
| 2 | (Malaysia) (Kyrgyzstan) | Jo-Leen Saw; Vladislava Andreevskaya | 2; 6 | 4; 6 |
| 3 | (Malaysia) (Kyrgyzstan) | Zan Ning Lim / Elsa Wan; Vladislava Andreevskaya / Safina Khabibrakhmanova | 7; 5 | 6; 4 |

==== Mongolia vs Singapore ====
Mongolia
3
National Tennis Centre, Kuala Lumpur, Malaysia
17 June 2025
Hard

Singapore
0

| | | | 1 | 2 | 3 |
|---|---|---|---|---|---|
| 1 | (Mongolia) (Singapore) | Martaa Chogsomjav; Audrey Tong | 6; 1 | 6; 1 |
| 2 | (Mongolia) (Singapore) | Maralgoo Chogsomjav; Eva Marie Desvignes | 4; 6 | 6; 1 | 7; 5 |
| 3 | (Mongolia) (Singapore) | Maralgoo Chogsomjav / Martaa Chogsomjav; Sophie Ashley Chua / Audrey Tong | 6; 1 | 6; 1 |

==== Kyrgyzstan vs Northern Mariana Islands ====
Kyrgyzstan
3
National Tennis Centre, Kuala Lumpur, Malaysia
17 June 2025
Hard

Northern Mariana Islands
0

| | | | 1 | 2 | 3 |
|---|---|---|---|---|---|
| 1 | (Kyrgyzstan) (Northern Mariana Islands) | Safina Khabibrakhmanova; Irin Chung | 6; 0 | 6; 0 |
| 2 | (Kyrgyzstan) (Northern Mariana Islands) | Vladislava Andreevskaya; Anne Lee | 6; 1 | 6; 1 |
| 3 | (Kyrgyzstan) (Northern Mariana Islands) | Vladislava Andreevskaya / Sezim Sagynbaeva; Hannah Chae / Serin Chung | 6; 0 | 6; 1 |

==== Mongolia vs Malaysia ====
Mongolia
3
National Tennis Centre, Kuala Lumpur, Malaysia
18 June 2025
Hard

Malaysia
0

| | | | 1 | 2 | 3 |
|---|---|---|---|---|---|
| 1 | (Mongolia) (Malaysia) | Martaa Chogsomjav; Zan Ning Lim | 7^{7} 6^{4} | 4; 6 | 6; 0 |
| 2 | (Mongolia) (Malaysia) | Maralgoo Chogsomjav; Elsa Wan | 6; 2 | 7; 5 |
| 3 | (Mongolia) (Malaysia) | Maralgoo Chogsomjav / Martaa Chogsomjav; Jo-Leen Saw / Hannah Seen Ean Yip | 7; 5 | 7; 5 |

==== Singapore vs Northern Mariana Islands ====
Singapore
3
National Tennis Centre, Kuala Lumpur, Malaysia
18 June 2025
Hard

Northern Mariana Islands
0

| | | | 1 | 2 | 3 |
|---|---|---|---|---|---|
| 1 | (Singapore) (Northern Mariana Islands) | Sophie Ashley Chua; Serin Chung | 6; 0 | 6; 0 |
| 2 | (Singapore) (Northern Mariana Islands) | Eva Marie Desvignes; Anne Lee | 6; 0 | 6; 0 |
| 3 | (Singapore) (Northern Mariana Islands) | Eva Marie Desvignes / Audrey Tong; Irin Chung / Anne Lee | 6; 1 | 6; 3 |

==== Malaysia vs Northern Mariana Islands ====
Malaysia
3
National Tennis Centre, Kuala Lumpur, Malaysia
19 June 2025
Hard

Northern Mariana Islands
0

| | | | 1 | 2 | 3 |
|---|---|---|---|---|---|
| 1 | (Malaysia) (Northern Mariana Islands) | Zan Ning Lim; Irin Chung | 6; 0 | 6; 1 |
| 2 | (Malaysia) (Northern Mariana Islands) | Jo-Leen Saw; Anne Lee | 6; 0 | 6; 1 |
| 3 | (Malaysia) (Northern Mariana Islands) | Elsa Wan / Hannah Seen Ean Yip; Hannah Chae / Serin Chung | 6; 1 | 6; 0 |

==== Singapore vs Kyrgyzstan ====
Singapore
1
National Tennis Centre, Kuala Lumpur, Malaysia
19 June 2025
Hard

Kyrgyzstan
2

| | | | 1 | 2 | 3 |
|---|---|---|---|---|---|
| 1 | (Singapore) (Kyrgyzstan) | Audrey Tong; Safina Khabibrakhmanova | 1; 6 | 1; 6 |
| 2 | (Singapore) (Kyrgyzstan) | Eva Marie Desvignes; Vladislava Andreevskaya | 7^{7} 6^{2} | 6; 4 |
| 3 | (Singapore) (Kyrgyzstan) | Sophie Ashley Chua / Eva Marie Desvignes; Vladislava Andreevskaya / Safina Khabibrakhmanova | 5; 7 | 3; 6 |

==== Mongolia vs Kyrgyzstan ====
Mongolia
1
National Tennis Centre, Kuala Lumpur, Malaysia
20 June 2025
Hard

Kyrgyzstan
2

| | | | 1 | 2 | 3 |
|---|---|---|---|---|---|---|
| 1 | (Mongolia) (Kyrgyzstan) | Martaa Chogsomjav; Safina Khabibrakhmanova | 6; 0 | 4; 6 | 6; 0 |
| 2 | (Mongolia) (Kyrgyzstan) | Maralgoo Chogsomjav; Vladislava Andreevskaya | 6; 3 | 2; 5 | | retired |
| 3 | (Mongolia) (Kyrgyzstan) | Ujin Batsukh / Sonomyanzum Enkhjarga; Vladislava Andreevskaya / Safina Khabibrakhmanova | 1; 6 | 4; 6 |

==== Malaysia vs Singapore ====
Malaysia
3
National Tennis Centre, Kuala Lumpur, Malaysia
20 June 2025
Hard

Singapore
0

| | | | 1 | 2 | 3 |
|---|---|---|---|---|---|
| 1 | (Malaysia) (Singapore) | Elsa Wan; Sophie Ashley Chua | 6; 0 | 6; 2 |
| 2 | (Malaysia) (Singapore) | Jo-Leen Saw; Eva Marie Desvignes | 7; 5 | 7^{7} 6^{1} |
| 3 | (Malaysia) (Singapore) | Elsa Wan / Hannah Seen Ean Yip; Erin Lee / Audrey Tong | 6; 2 | 6; 0 |

=== Pool B ===
| # | Team | P | W | L | Matches W-L | Sets W-L |
|---|---|---|---|---|---|---|
| 1 | Indonesia | 4 | 4 | 0 | 9–3 | 19–9 |
| 2 | Philippines | 4 | 3 | 1 | 7–5 | 17–15 |
| 3 | Pacific Oceania | 4 | 2 | 2 | 6–6 | 16–13 |
| 4 | Uzbekistan | 4 | 1 | 3 | 5–7 | 14–15 |
| 5 | Iran | 4 | 0 | 4 | 3–9 | 7–21 |

=== Promotion Play-Offs ===
==== Mongolia vs Philippines ====
Mongolia
2
National Tennis Centre, Kuala Lumpur, Malaysia
21 June 2025
Hard

Philippines
0

| | | | 1 | 2 | 3 |
|---|---|---|---|---|---|---|
| 1 | (Mongolia) (Philippines) | Martaa Chogsomjav; Tennielle Madis | 4; 6 | 6; 0 | 6; 4 |
| 2 | (Mongolia) (Philippines) | Maralgoo Chogsomjav; Alexa Joy Milliam | 6; 4 | 6; 1 |
| 3 | (Mongolia) (Philippines) | Maralgoo Chogsomjav / Martaa Chogsomjav; Tennielle Madis / Shaira Hope Rivera | | | | not played |

==== Indonesia vs Malaysia ====
Indonesia
2
National Tennis Centre, Kuala Lumpur, Malaysia
21 June 2025
Hard

Malaysia
0

| | | | 1 | 2 | 3 |
|---|---|---|---|---|---|---|
| 1 | (Indonesia) (Malaysia) | Anjali Kirana Junarto; Elsa Wan | 6; 2 | 6; 2 |
| 2 | (Indonesia) (Malaysia) | Mischka Sinclaire Goenadi; Jo-Leen Saw | 6^{6} 7^{8} | 6; 1 | 6; 4 |
| 3 | (Indonesia) (Malaysia) | Cylova Zuleyka Hukmasabiyya / Meydiana Laviola Reinnamah; Elsa Wan / Hannah Seen Ean Yip | | | | not played |

=== 5th to 6th Play-Off ===
==== Kyrgyzstan vs Pacific Oceania ====
Kyrgyzstan
2
National Tennis Centre, Kuala Lumpur, Malaysia
21 June 2025
Hard

Pacific Oceania
1

| | | | 1 | 2 | 3 |
|---|---|---|---|---|---|
| 1 | (Kyrgyzstan) (Pacific Oceania) | Safina Khabibrakhmanova; Litia Godinet | 6; 1 | 6; 0 |
| 2 | (Kyrgyzstan) (Pacific Oceania) | Vladislava Andreevskaya; Carolann Delaunay | 6; 1 | 2; 6 | 6; 4 |
| 3 | (Kyrgyzstan) (Pacific Oceania) | Vladislava Andreevskaya / Sezim Sagynbaeva; Patricia Apisah / Litia Godinet | 3; 6 | 3; 6 |

=== 7th to 8th Play-Off ===
==== Singapore vs Uzbekistan ====
Singapore
0
National Tennis Centre, Kuala Lumpur, Malaysia
21 June 2025
Hard

Uzbekistan
2

| | | | 1 | 2 | 3 |
|---|---|---|---|---|---|---|
| 1 | (Singapore) (Uzbekistan) | Audrey Tong; Nigina Alimova | 0; 6 | 0; 6 |
| 2 | (Singapore) (Uzbekistan) | Eva Marie Desvignes; Sabrina Olimjanova | 6^{4} 7^{7} | 0; 6 |
| 3 | (Singapore) (Uzbekistan) | Sophie Ashley Chua / Eva Marie Desvignes; Nigina Alimova / Zlata Chinnova | | | | not played |

=== 9th to 10th Play-Off ===
==== Northern Mariana Islands vs Iran ====
Northern Mariana Islands
0
National Tennis Centre, Kuala Lumpur, Malaysia
21 June 2025
Hard

Iran
2

| | | | 1 | 2 | 3 |
|---|---|---|---|---|---|---|
| 1 | (Northern Mariana Islands) (Iran) | Hannah Chae; Kimia Sagheb Tehrani | 0; 6 | 0; 6 |
| 2 | (Northern Mariana Islands) (Iran) | Anne Lee; Yasaman Yazdani | 2; 6 | 0; 6 |
| 3 | (Northern Mariana Islands) (Iran) | Irin Chung / Serin Chung; Kimia Sagheb Tehrani / Yasaman Yazdani | | | | not played |

=== Promotions/Relegations ===
- Indonesia and Mongolia were promoted to Asia/Oceania Zone Group I in 2026.
- Iran and Northern Mariana Islands were relegated to Asia/Oceania Zone Group III in 2026.

== Group III ==
- Date: Event A: 16–21 June 2025; Event B: 10–15 November 2025
- Venue: Event A: Colombo, Sri Lanka; Event B: NovaWorld Tennis Gardens, Phan Thiet, Vietnam

Asia/Oceania Group III is split into two Events (Event A, Event B) with two pools each.

Both events were supposed to take place at the same time; however, Event B had to be moved back due to geopolitical developments around Jordan.

Each Event will host a two-stage round robin, with Event A having one pool of four nations and one pool of five nations, while Event B sees two pools of five nations.

The teams finishing top of each pool will then face off in a promotional play-off against the corresponding pool winner within their Event to determine who advances to Asia/Oceania Group II in 2026, while no nations will be relegated.

=== Participating teams ===
==== Event A ====
- Myanmar

Htay Htay Myint, Nilar Win, Thiri Zoun, Ei Phyu, Kyi Mya Zaw (captain)

- Nepal

Abhilasha Bista, Shivali Gurung, Sunira Thapa, Swastika Bista, Krishna Raj Ghale (captain)

- Pakistan

Ushna Suhail, Amna Ali Qayum, Meheq Khokhar, Sajid Sheeza, Sara Mansoor (captain)

- Qatar

Hind Al-Mudahka, Dana Khalifa, Mubaraka Al-Naimi (captain)

- Sri Lanka

Dinara de Silva, Akeesha Silva Diyunuge, Oneli Samarawickrama, Inuki Jayaweera, Tuvini Seyara de Alwis, Thangarajah Dineshkanthan (captain)

- Tajikistan

Saiyora Rajabalieva, Anisa Yakhyaeva, Sumaya Tukhtaeva, Anastasiia Tashlintseva, Dalerjon Qurbonov (captain)

- Turkmenistan

Ilima Guseýnova, Aýnur Movlýamova, Leýli Esenova, Jennet Orazaliýeva, Gurbanberdi Gurbanberdiýev (captain)

==== Event B ====
- Bahrain

Hajar Zaidan, Eman Alzaimoor, Salma Faragallah, Haneen Alnajjar, Naila Almeer (captain)

- Brunei

Megan Lee Yit May, Ariana Sim, Chong Ming Rui, Eunice Lo Ying Ci, Aiman Abdullah (captain)

- Guam

Fremont Gibson, Charlotte Oh, Leila Mercado, Leah San Agustin, Torgun Smith (captain)

- Jordan

Sulaf Abu Latif, Hajar Al Louzi, Noor Sayej, Anna Abu Al Haj, Rama Bagaeen (captain)

- Laos

Malaylack Delilah Pathummakuronen, Siana MacDonald, Aliya Vongdala, Phonesamai Champamanivong (captain)

- Maldives

Naba Nishan, Aaraa Aasaal Azim, Nayara Usama Ali, Aishath Karin Saizan, Aminath Irufa Mahir (captain)

- Vietnam

Vũ Khánh Phương, Đặng Thị Hạnh, Phan Diễm Huỳnh, Nguyễn Thái Mai Linh, Ngô Hồng Hạnh, Đại Nghĩa Trần (captain)

Withdrawn

- Bhutan
- Iraq
- Macau
- Saudi Arabia

Inactive teams

- Bangladesh
- Lebanon
- Oman
- Syria

=== Event A ===
==== Pool A ====
| # | Team | P | W | L | Matches W-L | Sets W-L |
|---|---|---|---|---|---|---|
| 1 | Turkmenistan | 2 | 2 | 0 | 5–1 | 10–3 |
| 2 | Pakistan | 2 | 1 | 1 | 3–3 | 7–6 |
| 3 | Tajikistan | 2 | 0 | 2 | 1–5 | 3–11 |

==== Pool B ====
| # | Team | P | W | L | Matches W-L | Sets W-L |
|---|---|---|---|---|---|---|
| 1 | Sri Lanka | 3 | 2 | 1 | 7–2 | 15–5 |
| 2 | Myanmar | 3 | 2 | 1 | 6–3 | 12–8 |
| 3 | Nepal | 3 | 2 | 1 | 5–4 | 12–9 |
| 4 | Qatar | 3 | 0 | 3 | 0–9 | 1–18 |

=== Event B ===
==== Pool A ====
| # | Team | P | W | L | Matches W-L | Sets W-L |
|---|---|---|---|---|---|---|
| 1 | Maldives | 2 | 2 | 0 | 12–3 | 6–0 |
| 2 | Vietnam | 2 | 1 | 1 | 9–6 | 3–3 |
| 3 | Bahrain | 2 | 0 | 2 | 0–12 | 0–6 |

==== Pool B ====
| # | Team | P | W | L | Matches W-L | Sets W-L |
|---|---|---|---|---|---|---|
| 1 | Laos | 3 | 3 | 0 | 18–2 | 9–0 |
| 2 | Jordan | 3 | 2 | 1 | 9–11 | 4–5 |
| 3 | Guam | 3 | 1 | 2 | 9–13 | 3–6 |
| 4 | Brunei | 3 | 0 | 3 | 5–15 | 2–7 |

=== Promotion Play-Offs ===
==== Turkmenistan vs Sri Lanka ====
Turkmenistan
0
Colombo, Sri Lanka
20 June 2025
Clay

Sri Lanka
2

| | | | 1 | 2 | 3 |
|---|---|---|---|---|---|---|
| 1 | (Turkmenistan) (Sri Lanka) | Aýnur Movlýamova; Akeesha Silva Diyunuge | 0; 6 | 2; 6 |
| 2 | (Turkmenistan) (Sri Lanka) | Ilima Guseýnova; Dinara de Silva | 2; 6 | 0; 6 |
| 3 | (Turkmenistan) (Sri Lanka) | Aýnur Movlýamova / Ilima Guseýnova; Dinara de Silva / Inuki Jayaweera | | | | not played |

==== Maldives vs Laos ====
Maldives
1
Phan Thiet, Vietnam
15 November 2025
Hard

Laos
2

| | | | 1 | 2 | 3 |
|---|---|---|---|---|---|
| 1 | (Maldives) (Laos) | Naba Nishan; Siana MacDonald | 2; 6 | 7^{7} 6^{5} | 7^{7} 6^{5} |
| 2 | (Maldives) (Laos) | Aaraa Aasaal Azim; Malaylack Delilah Pathummakuronen | 2; 6 | 3; 6 |
| 3 | (Maldives) (Laos) | Aaraa Aasaal Azim / Naba Nishan; Siana MacDonald / Malaylack Delilah Pathummakuronen | 0; 6 | 1; 6 |

=== Promotions ===
- Sri Lanka and Laos were promoted to Asia/Oceania Zone Group II in 2026.
