= Philippines Billie Jean King Cup team =

Tennis team of the Philippines

Philippines
- Captain: Denise Dy
- Coach: Bobie Angelo
- Nations Ranking: 58 ▲10 (September 28, 2026)
- Colors: blue & white
- First year: 1974
- Years played: 43
- Ties played (W–L): 151 (77–74)
- Years in World Group: 6 (1–6)
- Most total wins: Marian Jade Capadocia (31–4)
- Most singles wins: Marian Jade Capadocia (16–3)
- Most doubles wins: Anna Clarice Patrimonio (17–6)
- Best doubles team: Marian Capadocia / Anna Clarice Patrimonio (8–1)
- Most ties played: Anna Clarice Patrimonio (34)
- Most years played: Dyan Castillejo (10)

The Philippines Billie Jean King Cup team is a tennis team that represents the Philippines in Billie Jean King Cup (formerly the Fed Cup) competition. They are governed by the Philippine Tennis Association.

== History ==
The Philippines competed in its first Fed Cup in 1974. Their best result was reaching the 16th round in 1982. The team was set to participate at the 1979 Fed Cup, with their first game against the United States at the first round but withdrew from the tournament due to "administrative reasons". The Philippines competed in Asia/Oceania Zone Group II in the 2011 Fed Cup.

The country was banned for two years by the International Tennis Federation due to "long-standing governance failings" within the Philippine Tennis Association. This meant that the Philippines was barred from the Billie Jean King Cup starting from the 2021 season. Philta's suspension was lifted in January 2024 after a new set of officers were elected in an ITF-ordered vote in December 2023.

The Philippines returned to the Billie Jean King Cup in 2024 Asia/Oceania Zone Group III. They won a promotion back to Group II after winning over Laos. They earned a promotion again to Group I after topping 2026 Asia/Oceania Zone Group II.

== Teams ==
Year	Members					Ref.
1992	Jennifer Saret	Francesca La'O	—	—	—	
1993	Jean Marie Lozano	Francesca La'O	Evangeline Olivarez	—	—	
1994	Francesca La'O	Maricris Gentz	—	—	—	
1995	Francesca La'O	Marisue Jacutin	—	—	—	
1996	Marisue Jacutin	Cristina Bengzon	—	—	—	
1997	Jennifer Saret	Marisue Jacutin	Pamela Floro	—	—	
1998	Jennifer Saret	Marisue Jacutin	Pamela Floro	—	—	
2000	Maricris Gentz	Czarina Mae Arevalo	Vida Lina Alpuerto	—	—	
2001	Vida Lina Alpuerto	Jennifer Saret	Czarina Mae Arevalo	—	—	
2002	Czarina Mae Arevalo	Charise Godoy	Anna Patricia Santos	—	—	
2003	Francesca La'O	Czarina Mae Arevalo	Anna Patricia Santos	Chris Cuarto (c)	—	
2004	Czarina Mae Arevalo	Anna Patricia Santos	Alyssa Ann Labay	Chris Cuarto (c)	—	
2005	Czarina Mae Arevalo	Anja Vanessa Peter	Denise Dy	Chris Cuarto (c)	—	
2006	Czarina Mae Arevalo	Anja Vanessa Peter	Denise Dy	Chris Cuarto (c)	—	
2008	Czarina Mae Arevalo	Denise Dy	Dianne Matias	—	—	
2010	Anna Christine Patrimonio	Michelle Pang	Marinel Rudas	Maricris Gentz	—	
2011	Anna Christine Patrimonio	Anna Clarice Patrimonio	Marinel Rudas	Tamitha Nguyen	Chris Cuarto (c)	
2012	Anna Christine Patrimonio	Anna Clarice Patrimonio	Tamitha Nguyen	Maika Jae Tanpoco	Karl Santamaria (c)	
2013	Marinel Rudas	Anna Clarice Patrimonio	Marian Jade Capadocia	Karl Santamaria (c)	—	
2014	Marian Jade Capadocia	Anna Clarice Patrimonio	Czarina Mae Arevalo (c)	—	—	
2015	Katharina Lehnert	Anna Clarice Patrimonio	Edilyn Balanga	Chris Cuarto (c)	—	
2016	Katharina Lehnert	Anna Clarice Patrimonio	Khim Iglupas	Chris Cuarto (c)	—	
2017	Katharina Lehnert	Anna Clarice Patrimonio	Khim Iglupas	Czarina Mae Arevalo (c)	—	
2018	Katharina Lehnert	Anna Clarice Patrimonio	Khim Iglupas	Marian Jade Capadocia	Czarina Mae Arevalo (c)	
2019	Marian Jade Capadocia	Khim Iglupas	Katharina Lehnert	Patrick John Tierro (c)	—	
2020–21	Marian Jade Capadocia	Anna Clarice Patrimonio	Shaira Hope Rivera	Czarina Mae Arevalo (c)	—	
2024	Alexandra Eala	Marian Jade Capadocia	Khim Iglupas	Shaira Hope Rivera	Denise Dy (c)	
2025	Alexa Joy Milliam	Shaira Hope Rivera	Tennielle Madis	Stefi Marithe Aludo	Denise Dy (c)	
2026	Shaira Rivera	Alexa Joy Milliam	Tennielle Madis	Stefi Marithe Aludo	Denise Dy (c)	

== Results ==
=== 2020–2029 ===
Year	Competition	Date	Location	Opponent	Score	Result	Report
2020–21	Asia/Oceania Group II, Round Robin	4 February 2020	Wellington (NZL)	Guam	3–0	Won	Report
2020–21	Asia/Oceania Group II, Round Robin	6 February 2020	Wellington (NZL)	Thailand	2–1	Won	Report
2020–21	Asia/Oceania Group II, Round Robin	7 February 2020	Wellington (NZL)	Turkmenistan	3–0	Won	Report
2020–21	Asia/Oceania Group II, Finals	8 February 2020	Wellington (NZL)	New Zealand	1–2	Lost	Report
2024	Asia/Oceania Group III, Round Robin	25 November 2024	Manama (BHR)	Guam	3–0	Won	Report
2024	Asia/Oceania Group III, Round Robin	26 November 2024	Manama (BHR)	Qatar	3–0	Won	Report
2024	Asia/Oceania Group III, Round Robin	28 November 2024	Manama (BHR)	Nepal	3–0	Won	Report
2024	Asia/Oceania Group III, Semifinals	30 November 2024	Manama (BHR)	Laos	3–0	Won	Report
2025	Asia/Oceania Group II, Round Robin	16 June 2025	Kuala Lumpur (MAS)	Indonesia	0–3	Lost	Report
2025	Asia/Oceania Group II, Round Robin	17 June 2025	Kuala Lumpur (MAS)	Uzbekistan	2–1	Won	Report
2025	Asia/Oceania Group II, Round Robin	18 June 2025	Kuala Lumpur (MAS)	Iran	3–0	Won	Report
2025	Asia/Oceania Group II, Round Robin	20 June 2025	Kuala Lumpur (MAS)	Pacific Oceania	2–1	Won	Report
2025	Asia/Oceania Group II, Semifinals	21 June 2025	Kuala Lumpur (MAS)	Mongolia	0–2	Lost	Report
2026	Asia/Oceania Group II, Round Robin	15 June 2026	Kuala Lumpur (MAS)	Hong Kong	2–1	Won	Report
2026	Asia/Oceania Group II, Round Robin	16 June 2026	Kuala Lumpur (MAS)	Singapore	2–1	Won	Report
2026	Asia/Oceania Group II, Round Robin	18 June 2026	Kuala Lumpur (MAS)	Pacific Oceania	1–2	Lost	Report
2026	Asia/Oceania Group II, Round Robin	19 June 2026	Kuala Lumpur (MAS)	Kyrgyzstan	3–0	Won	Report
2026	Asia/Oceania Group II, Semifinals	20 June 2026	Kuala Lumpur (MAS)	Uzbekistan	2–1	Won	Report

== See also ==
- Billie Jean King Cup
- Philippines Davis Cup team
