= 2020 Billie Jean King Cup Asia/Oceania Zone Group II – Pool A (Wellington) =

Subsection of tennis competition

Pool A (Wellington) of the 2020–21 Billie Jean King Cup Asia/Oceania Zone Group II was one of four pools in the Asia/Oceania zone of the 2020–21 Billie Jean King Cup. Four teams competed in a round robin competition, with the top team and the bottom teams proceeding to their respective sections of the play-offs: the top team played for advancement to Group I.

== Standings ==
		NZL	PAK	MGL	SGP	RR; W–L	Set; W–L	Game; W–L	Standings
3	New Zealand		3–0	3–0	3–0	9–0	18–0 (100%)	108–13 (89%)	1
5	Pakistan	0–3		2–1	2–1	4–5	8–10 (44%)	60–71 (46%)	2
8	Mongolia	0–3	1–2		2–1	3–6	6–13 (32%)	59–94 (39%)	3
1	Singapore	0–3	1–2	1–2		2–7	5–14 (26%)	48–97 (33%)	4

Standings are determined by: 1. number of wins; 2. number of matches; 3. in two-team ties, head-to-head records; 4. in three-team ties, (a) percentage of matches won (head-to-head records if two teams remain tied), then (b) percentage of sets won (head-to-head records if two teams remain tied), then (c) percentage of games won (head-to-head records if two teams remain tied), then (d) Billie Jean King Cup rankings.

== Round-robin ==
=== Pakistan vs. Mongolia ===
Pakistan
2
Renouf Tennis Centre, Wellington, New Zealand
4 February 2020
Hard

Mongolia
1

			1	2	3
1	(Pakistan) (Mongolia)	Mahin Qureshi; Erdenesuren Erdenebat	3; 6	1; 6
2	(Pakistan) (Mongolia)	Ushna Suhail; Jargal Altansarnai	6; 3	6; 0
3	(Pakistan) (Mongolia)	Mahin Qureshi / Ushna Suhail; Shinejargal Battur / Bolor Enkhbayar	6; 3	6; 3

=== Singapore vs. Pakistan ===
Singapore
1
Renouf Tennis Centre, Wellington, New Zealand
5 February 2020
Hard

Pakistan
2

			1	2	3
1	(Singapore) (Pakistan)	Sarah Pang; Ushna Suhail	0; 6	0; 6
2	(Singapore) (Pakistan)	Izabella Tan Hui-xin; Sarah Mahboob Khan	6; 2	6; 1
3	(Singapore) (Pakistan)	Tammy Tan / Izabella Tan Hui-xin; Mahin Qureshi / Ushna Suhail	1; 6	1; 6

=== New Zealand vs. Mongolia ===
New Zealand
3
Renouf Tennis Centre, Wellington, New Zealand
5 February 2020
Hard

Mongolia
0

			1	2	3
1	(New Zealand) (Mongolia)	Valentina Ivanov; Bolor Enkhbayar	6; 0	6; 0
2	(New Zealand) (Mongolia)	Emily Fanning; Erdenesuren Erdenebat	6; 1	6; 0
3	(New Zealand) (Mongolia)	Erin Routliffe / Kelly Southwood; Jargal Altansarnai / Bolor Enkhbayar	6; 2	6; 1

=== Singapore vs. Mongolia ===
Singapore
1
Renouf Tennis Centre, Wellington, New Zealand
6 February 2020
Hard

Mongolia
2

			1	2	3
1	(Singapore) (Mongolia)	Izabella Tan Hui-xin; Erdenesuren Erdenebat	6; 1	7; 5
2	(Singapore) (Mongolia)	Tammy Tan; Jargal Altansarnai	2; 6	2; 6
3	(Singapore) (Mongolia)	Sarah Pang / Izabella Tan Hui-xin; Bolor Enkhbayar / Erdenesuren Erdenebat	1; 6	6; 3	6^{4} 7^{7}

=== New Zealand vs. Pakistan ===
New Zealand
3
Renouf Tennis Centre, Wellington, New Zealand
6 February 2020
Hard

Pakistan
0

			1	2	3
1	(New Zealand) (Pakistan)	Emily Fanning; Mahin Qureshi	6; 0	6; 2
2	(New Zealand) (Pakistan)	Paige Hourigan; Sarah Mahboob Khan	6; 2	6; 0
3	(New Zealand) (Pakistan)	Valentina Ivanov / Erin Routliffe; Mahin Qureshi / Ushna Suhail	6; 1	6; 0

=== Singapore vs. New Zealand ===
Singapore
0
Renouf Tennis Centre, Wellington, New Zealand
7 February 2020
Hard

New Zealand
3

			1	2	3
1	(Singapore) (New Zealand)	Sarah Pang; Valentina Ivanov	1; 6	1; 6
2	(Singapore) (New Zealand)	Izabella Tan Hui-xin; Paige Hourigan	1; 6	1; 6
3	(Singapore) (New Zealand)	Sarah Pang / Tammy Tan; Emily Fanning / Erin Routliffe	0; 6	0; 6
