= 2022 Billie Jean King Cup Asia/Oceania Zone Group II – Pool A (Dushanbe) =

Subsection of tennis competition

Pool A (Dushanbe) of the 2022 Billie Jean King Cup Asia/Oceania Zone Group II was one of four pools in the Asia/Oceania zone of the 2022 Billie Jean King Cup. Four teams competed in a round robin competition, with each team proceeding to their respective sections of the play-offs: the top team played for advancement to Group I in 2023.

== Standings ==
		UZB	SRI	GUM	BRU	RR; W–L	Set; W–L	Game; W–L	Standings
1	Uzbekistan		2–1	3–0	3–0	3–0	16–2 (89%)	104–33 (76%)	1
4	Sri Lanka	1–2		3–0	3–0	2–1	14–4 (78%)	92–39 (70%)	2
5	Guam	0–3	0–3		3–0	1–2	6–12 (33%)	47–86 (35%)	3
–	Brunei	0–3	0–3	0–3		0–3	0–18 (0%)	24–109 (18%)	4

Standings are determined by: 1. number of wins; 2. number of matches; 3. in two-team ties, head-to-head records; 4. in three-team ties, (a) percentage of matches won (head-to-head records if two teams remain tied), then (b) percentage of sets won (head-to-head records if two teams remain tied), then (c) percentage of games won (head-to-head records if two teams remain tied), then (d) Billie Jean King Cup rankings.

== Round-robin ==
=== Sri Lanka vs. Brunei ===
Sri Lanka
3
Central Stadium Frunze, Dushanbe, Tajikistan
22 August 2022
Hard

Brunei
0

			1	2	3
1	(Sri Lanka) (Brunei)	Rukshika Wijesooriya; Chong Ming-rui	6; 0	6; 1
2	(Sri Lanka) (Brunei)	Hasali Gajaba; Tan Jia-hui	6; 0	6; 0
3	(Sri Lanka) (Brunei)	Janali Manamperi / Rukshika Wijesooriya; Chong Ming-rui / Tan Jia-hui	6; 1	6; 1

=== Uzbekistan vs. Guam ===
Uzbekistan
3
Central Stadium Frunze, Dushanbe, Tajikistan
23 August 2022
Hard

Guam
0

			1	2	3
1	(Uzbekistan) (Guam)	Ominahon Valihanova; Sydney Packbier	6; 2	6; 0
2	(Uzbekistan) (Guam)	Akgul Amanmuradova; Fremont Gibson	6; 0	6; 0
3	(Uzbekistan) (Guam)	Nasiba Espolova / Aliya Musabekova; Fremont Gibson / Sydney Packbier	6; 1	6; 3

=== Uzbekistan vs. Brunei ===
Uzbekistan
3
Central Stadium Frunze, Dushanbe, Tajikistan
24 August 2022
Hard

Brunei
0

			1	2	3
1	(Uzbekistan) (Brunei)	Maftunabonu Kahramonova; Chong Ming-rui	6; 1	6; 2
2	(Uzbekistan) (Brunei)	Ominahon Valihanova; Tan Jia-hui	6; 1	6; 0
3	(Uzbekistan) (Brunei)	Nasiba Espolova / Aliya Musabekova; Chong Ming-rui / Tan Jia-hui	6; 1	6; 2

=== Sri Lanka vs. Guam ===
Sri Lanka
3
Central Stadium Frunze, Dushanbe, Tajikistan
24 August 2022
Hard

Guam
0

			1	2	3
1	(Sri Lanka) (Guam)	Anjalika Kurera; Sydney Packbier	6; 0	6; 1
2	(Sri Lanka) (Guam)	Rukshika Wijesooriya; Fremont Gibson	6; 0	6; 2
3	(Sri Lanka) (Guam)	Janali Manamperi / Rukshika Wijesooriya; Fremont Gibson / Sydney Packbier	6; 1	6; 0

=== Uzbekistan vs. Sri Lanka ===
Uzbekistan
2
Central Stadium Frunze, Dushanbe, Tajikistan
25 August 2022
Hard

Sri Lanka
1

			1	2	3
1	(Uzbekistan) (Sri Lanka)	Ominahon Valihanova; Anjalika Kurera	6; 2	6; 1
2	(Uzbekistan) (Sri Lanka)	Akgul Amanmuradova; Rukshika Wijesooriya	6; 3	6; 2
3	(Uzbekistan) (Sri Lanka)	Nasiba Espolova / Maftunabonu Kahramonova; Janali Manamperi / Rukshika Wijesooriya	4; 6	4; 6

=== Guam vs. Brunei ===
Guam
3
Central Stadium Frunze, Dushanbe, Tajikistan
25 August 2022
Hard

Brunei
0

			1	2	3
1	(Guam) (Brunei)	Sydney Packbier; Chong Ming-rui	6; 4	6; 2
2	(Guam) (Brunei)	Fremont Gibson; Tan Jia-hui	6; 1	6; 2
3	(Guam) (Brunei)	Fremont Gibson / Sydney Packbier; Chong Ming-rui / Tan Jia-hui	7; 5	6; 0
