= 2022 Billie Jean King Cup Asia/Oceania Zone Group II – Pool B (Dushanbe) =

Subsection of tennis competition

Pool B (Dushanbe) of the 2022 Billie Jean King Cup Asia/Oceania Zone Group II was one of four pools in the Asia/Oceania zone of the 2022 Billie Jean King Cup. Four teams competed in a round robin competition, with each team proceeding to their respective sections of the play-offs: the top team played for advancement to Group I in 2023.

== Standings ==
		MGL	PAK	TKM	TJK	RR; W–L	Set; W–L	Game; W–L	Standings
6	Mongolia		3–0	3–0	3–0	3–0	18–1 (95%)	113–19 (86%)	1
2	Pakistan	0–3		2–1	3–0	2–1	11–9 (55%)	85–75 (53%)	2
3	Turkmenistan	0–3	1–2		3–0	1–2	9–10 (47%)	62–79 (44%)	3
7	Tajikistan	0–3	0–3	0–3		0–2	0–18 (0%)	22–109 (17%)	4

Standings are determined by: 1. number of wins; 2. number of matches; 3. in two-team ties, head-to-head records; 4. in three-team ties, (a) percentage of matches won (head-to-head records if two teams remain tied), then (b) percentage of sets won (head-to-head records if two teams remain tied), then (c) percentage of games won (head-to-head records if two teams remain tied), then (d) Billie Jean King Cup rankings.

== Round-robin ==
=== Pakistan vs. Mongolia ===
Pakistan
0
Central Stadium Frunze, Dushanbe, Tajikistan
22 August 2022
Hard

Mongolia
3

			1	2	3
1	(Pakistan) (Mongolia)	Ushna Suhail; Martaa Chogsomjav	0; 6	3; 6
2	(Pakistan) (Mongolia)	Sarah Mahboob Khan; Maralgoo Chogsomjav	2; 6	0; 6
3	(Pakistan) (Mongolia)	Sarah Mahboob Khan / Ushna Suhail; Jargal Altansarnai / Maralgoo Chogsomjav	3; 6	7; 5	1; 6

=== Turkmenistan vs. Tajikistan ===
Turkmenistan
3
Central Stadium Frunze, Dushanbe, Tajikistan
22 August 2022
Hard

Tajikistan
0

			1	2	3
1	(Turkmenistan) (Tajikistan)	Meryem Muhammedova; Gulnozakhon Yakhyaeva	6; 0	6; 0
2	(Turkmenistan) (Tajikistan)	Anastasiya Azimbayeva; Anastasiya Tursunova	6; 3	7^{8} 6^{6}
3	(Turkmenistan) (Tajikistan)	Aisha Bikbulatova / Rozhan Karajayeva; Malika Rakhimova / Sumaya Tukhtaeva	6; 0	6; 1

=== Pakistan vs. Tajikistan ===
Pakistan
3
Central Stadium Frunze, Dushanbe, Tajikistan
23 August 2022
Hard

Tajikistan
0

			1	2	3
1	(Pakistan) (Tajikistan)	Ushna Suhail; Sumaya Tukhtaeva	6; 1	6; 1
2	(Pakistan) (Tajikistan)	Sarah Mahboob Khan; Anastasiya Tursunova	6; 4	6; 4
3	(Pakistan) (Tajikistan)	Meheq Khokhar / Noor Malik; Nakkhat Holova / Gulnozakhon Yakhyaeva	6; 0	6; 1

=== Turkmenistan vs. Mongolia ===
Turkmenistan
0
Central Stadium Frunze, Dushanbe, Tajikistan
23 August 2022
Hard

Mongolia
3

			1	2	3
1	(Turkmenistan) (Mongolia)	Bahar Toymyradova; Martaa Chogsomjav	0; 6	0; 6
2	(Turkmenistan) (Mongolia)	Anastasiya Azimbayeva; Maralgoo Chogsomjav	0; 6	2; 6
3	(Turkmenistan) (Mongolia)	Aisha Bikbulatova / Meryem Muhammedova; Maralgoo Chogsomjav / Martaa Chogsomjav	0; 6	0; 6

=== Mongolia vs. Tajikistan ===
Mongolia
3
Central Stadium Frunze, Dushanbe, Tajikistan
24 August 2022
Hard

Tajikistan
0

			1	2	3
1	(Mongolia) (Tajikistan)	Maralgoo Chogsomjav; Gulnozakhon Yakhyaeva	6; 0	6; 0
2	(Mongolia) (Tajikistan)	Jargal Altansarnai; Anastasiya Tursunova	6; 0	6; 1
3	(Mongolia) (Tajikistan)	Maralgoo Chogsomjav / Martaa Chogsomjav; Malika Rakhimova / Sumaya Tukhtaeva	6; 0	6; 0

=== Pakistan vs. Turkmenistan ===
Pakistan
2
Central Stadium Frunze, Dushanbe, Tajikistan
25 August 2022
Hard

Turkmenistan
1

			1	2	3
1	(Pakistan) (Turkmenistan)	Ushna Suhail; Aisha Bikbulatova	6; 0	2; 6	6; 3
2	(Pakistan) (Turkmenistan)	Sarah Mahboob Khan; Anastasiya Azimbayeva	3; 6	4; 6
3	(Pakistan) (Turkmenistan)	Sarah Mahboob Khan / Ushna Suhail; Anastasiya Azimbayeva / Bahar Toymyradova	6; 1	6; 1
