= Tennielle Madis =

Filipino tennis player (born 2007)

- Full name: Tennielle Bedua Madis
- Country (sports): Philippines
- Born: August 27, 2007 (age 19)
- Coach: Robert Angelo
Medal record
Women's tennis
SEA Games
Bronze medal – third place	2025 Thailand	Doubles
Bronze medal – third place	2025 Thailand	Team

Tennielle Bedua Madis (born August 27, 2007) is a Filipino professional tennis player.

== Early life and education ==
Tennielle Bedua Madis was born on August 27, 2007, and hails from M'lang, Cotabato. She took up tennis at five years old. Her sister, Jazelle also grew up to be a tennis player. She attended the Southern Baptist College but later underwent home schooling. She is grade 12 as of 2025–2026 academic year. She plans to start attending the University of Hawaiʻi at Mānoa (UH Mānoa) in late 2026.

== Career ==
Madis has been training under coach Robert Angelo at the Philippine Tennis Academy. She has represented the Philippines internationally.

She has been competing locally as early as 2016 such as at the Palawan Pawnshop-Palawan Express Pera Padala age group tournaments.

In 2023, Madis reached the finals in her debut at the Philippine Columbian Association (PCA) Open losing to Marian Capadocia in the final.

In 2025, Madis won her first Gentry Open women's singles title and her first PCA Open title in October. She also became part of the Philippines Billie Jean King Cup team playing at the 2025 Asia/Oceania Zone Group II

At the 2025 SEA Games in Thailand, Madis won two bronze medals in the women's doubles and team events.

Madis transitioned from the junior to the senior level in 2026. Madis participated in her first WTA 125 event, the 2026 Philippine Women's Open through a wild card. At the time she is Philippines' ranked no. 2 behind Alexandra Eala. However she lost to Thai player Mananchaya Sawangkaew in the first round of the singles event.

Madis is set to play for the Hawaii Rainbow Wahine tennis team in the NCAA Division I after signing with UH Mānoa in February 2026.
