= 2022 Billie Jean King Cup Asia/Oceania Zone Group II – Pool A (Kuala Lumpur) =

Subsection of tennis competition

Pool A (Kuala Lumpur) of the 2022 Billie Jean King Cup Asia/Oceania Zone Group II was one of four pools in the Asia/Oceania zone of the 2022 Billie Jean King Cup. Five teams competed in a round robin competition, with each team proceeding to their respective sections of the play-offs: the top team played for advancement to Group I in 2023.

== Standings ==
		HKG	TPE	VIE	IRI	LAO	RR; W–L	Set; W–L	Game; W–L	Standings
4	Hong Kong		2–1	3–0	3–0	3–0	4–0	22–4 (85%)	138–48 (74%)	1
1	Chinese Taipei	1–2		2–1	3–0	3–0	3–1	18–6 (75%)	123–50 (71%)	2
8	Vietnam	0–3	1–2		2–1	3–0	2–2	15–12 (56%)	115–93 (55%)	3
6	Iran	0–3	0–3	1–2		3–0	1–3	8–17 (32%)	65–111 (37%)	4
–	Laos	0–3	0–3	0–3	0–3		0–4	0–24 (0%)	5–144 (3%)	5

Standings are determined by: 1. number of wins; 2. number of matches; 3. in two-team ties, head-to-head records; 4. in three-team ties, (a) percentage of matches won (head-to-head records if two teams remain tied), then (b) percentage of sets won (head-to-head records if two teams remain tied), then (c) percentage of games won (head-to-head records if two teams remain tied), then (d) Billie Jean King Cup rankings.

== Round-robin ==
=== Chinese Taipei vs. Iran ===
Chinese Taipei
3
National Tennis Center, Kuala Lumpur, Malaysia
8 August 2022
Hard

Iran
0

			1	2	3
1	(Chinese Taipei) (Iran)	Yang Ya-yi; Mehraneh Zohourian	6; 0	6; 0
2	(Chinese Taipei) (Iran)	Lee Pei-chi; Fatemeh Alsadat Zanjani	6; 0	6; 1
3	(Chinese Taipei) (Iran)	Hsu Chieh-yu / Li Yu-yun; Nili Atfi / Yasaman Yazdani	6; 0	6; 2

=== Hong Kong vs. Vietnam ===
Hong Kong
3
National Tennis Center, Kuala Lumpur, Malaysia
8 August 2022
Hard

Vietnam
0

			1	2	3
1	(Hong Kong) (Vietnam)	Wu Ho-ching; Sophia Huỳnh Trần Ngọc Nhi	6; 0	6; 1
2	(Hong Kong) (Vietnam)	Eudice Chong; Savanna Lý-Nguyễn	6; 4	2; 6	6; 2
3	(Hong Kong) (Vietnam)	Maggie Ng / Wu Ho-ching; Đào Minh Trang / Savanna Lý-Nguyễn	2; 6	6; 3	6; 2

=== Chinese Taipei vs. Laos ===
Chinese Taipei
3
National Tennis Center, Kuala Lumpur, Malaysia
9 August 2022
Hard

Laos
0

			1	2	3
1	(Chinese Taipei) (Laos)	Lee Ya-hsin; Thirada Phommachack	6; 0	6; 1
2	(Chinese Taipei) (Laos)	Hsu Chieh-yu; Phonesamai Champamanivong	6; 0	6; 0
3	(Chinese Taipei) (Laos)	Li Yu-yun / Yang Ya-yi; Phonesamai Champamanivong / Thirada Phommachack	6; 0	6; 0

=== Hong Kong vs. Iran ===
Hong Kong
3
National Tennis Center, Kuala Lumpur, Malaysia
9 August 2022
Hard

Iran
0

			1	2	3
1	(Hong Kong) (Iran)	Wu Ho-ching; Yasaman Yazdani	6; 1	6; 0
2	(Hong Kong) (Iran)	Eudice Chong; Fatemeh Alsadat Zanjani	6; 0	6; 0
3	(Hong Kong) (Iran)	Maggie Ng / Wu Ho-ching; Nili Atfi / Mehraneh Zohourian	6; 1	6; 0

=== Chinese Taipei vs. Hong Kong ===
Chinese Taipei
1
National Tennis Center, Kuala Lumpur, Malaysia
10 August 2022
Hard

Hong Kong
2

			1	2	3
1	(Chinese Taipei) (Hong Kong)	Yang Ya-yi; Wu Ho-ching	6; 1	6; 1
2	(Chinese Taipei) (Hong Kong)	Lee Pei-chi; Eudice Chong	0; 6	4; 6
3	(Chinese Taipei) (Hong Kong)	Li Yu-yun / Yang Ya-yi; Eudice Chong / Maggie Ng	2; 6	4; 6

=== Vietnam vs. Laos ===
Vietnam
3
National Tennis Center, Kuala Lumpur, Malaysia
10 August 2022
Hard

Laos
0

			1	2	3
1	(Vietnam) (Laos)	Đào Minh Trang; Thirada Phommachack	6; 0	6; 0
2	(Vietnam) (Laos)	Savanna Lý-Nguyễn; Phonesamai Champamanivong	6; 0	6; 0
3	(Vietnam) (Laos)	Sophia Huỳnh Trần Ngọc Nhi / Savanna Lý-Nguyễn; Thirada Phommachack / Vanvilay Xaiphengthong	6; 0	6; 0

=== Chinese Taipei vs. Vietnam ===
Chinese Taipei
2
National Tennis Center, Kuala Lumpur, Malaysia
11 August 2022
Hard

Vietnam
1

			1	2	3
1	(Chinese Taipei) (Vietnam)	Li Yu-yun; Sophia Huỳnh Trần Ngọc Nhi	6; 4	6; 1
2	(Chinese Taipei) (Vietnam)	Hsu Chieh-yu; Savanna Lý-Nguyễn	3; 6	2; 6
3	(Chinese Taipei) (Vietnam)	Lee Pei-chi / Lee Ya-hsin; Đào Minh Trang / Savanna Lý-Nguyễn	6; 2	6; 1

=== Iran vs. Laos ===
Iran
3
National Tennis Center, Kuala Lumpur, Malaysia
11 August 2022
Hard

Laos
0

			1	2	3
1	(Iran) (Laos)	Yasaman Yazdani; Thirada Phommachack	6; 0	6; 1
2	(Iran) (Laos)	Fatemeh Alsadat Zanjani; Phonesamai Champamanivong	6; 0	6; 0
3	(Iran) (Laos)	Yasaman Yazdani / Mehraneh Zohourian; Phonesamai Champamanivong / Thirada Phommachack	6; 1	6; 2

=== Hong Kong vs. Laos ===
Hong Kong
3
National Tennis Center, Kuala Lumpur, Malaysia
12 August 2022
Hard

Laos
0

			1	2	3
1	(Hong Kong) (Laos)	Wu Ho-ching; Thirada Phommachack	6; 0	6; 0
2	(Hong Kong) (Laos)	Eudice Chong; Phonesamai Champamanivong	6; 0	6; 0
3	(Hong Kong) (Laos)	Maggie Ng / Wu Ho-ching; Phonesamai Champamanivong / Vanvilay Xaiphengthong	6; 0	6; 0

=== Iran vs. Vietnam ===
Iran
1
National Tennis Center, Kuala Lumpur, Malaysia
12 August 2022
Hard

Vietnam
2

			1	2	3
1	(Iran) (Vietnam)	Yasaman Yazdani; Đào Minh Trang	4; 6	6; 1	6; 4
2	(Iran) (Vietnam)	Fatemeh Alsadat Zanjani; Savanna Lý-Nguyễn	0; 6	0; 6
3	(Iran) (Vietnam)	Yasaman Yazdani / Mehraneh Zohourian; Sophia Huỳnh Trần Ngọc Nhi / Savanna Lý-Nguyễn	4; 6	4; 6
