= Valentina Ivanov =

New Zealand tennis player (born 2001)

- Country (sports): New Zealand
- Residence: Sydney, Australia
- Born: 27 March 2001 (age 25) Christchurch, New Zealand
- Height: 1.72 m (5 ft 8 in)
- Plays: Right (two-handed backhand)
- Prize money: $29,827

Singles
- Career record: 76–71
- Career titles: 1 ITF
- Highest ranking: No. 738 (28 January 2019)
- Current ranking: No. 914 (6 April 2026)

Doubles
- Career record: 65–37
- Career titles: 7 ITF
- Highest ranking: No. 447 (2 March 2026)
- Current ranking: No. 451 (23 March 2026)

Team competitions
- Fed Cup: 13–8 (singles 7–7, doubles 6–1)
- Last updated on: 23 March 2026.

Valentina Ivanov (born 27 March 2001) is a New Zealand tennis player, although she has lived in Sydney since she was two years old.

Ivanov's mother Oksana was a member of the Uzbekistan Fed Cup team in 1995 and 1997, being joined in the latter by her younger sister Irina. The Uzbekistan team captain that year was Oksana's future husband (and Valentina's father), Sergey Ivanov. Valentina was coached by both parents until she was 12.

On the ITF Junior Circuit, Ivanov has a career-high combined ranking of 85, achieved on 2 April 2018.

== Tennis career ==
=== Junior highlights ===
Ivanov won two Grade-4 singles titles in 2017, and five junior doubles titles in 2017 and 2018, four with Australian Amber Marshall and one, the Grade-2 2017 Lee Duk Hee Cup Chuncheon International Junior Tennis Championships, with Supapitch Kuearum.

=== 2019 ===
Ivanov made her WTA Tour main-draw debut as a wildcard, with fellow New Zealand junior Elys Ventura, in the ASB Classic in Auckland. They lost in the first round of doubles to the eventual runners-up, Paige Hourigan and Taylor Townsend, after Ivanov had defeated Hourigan in the first round of singles qualifying, repeating the result of the New Zealand Championships final. She lost in the second qualifying round to Bibiane Schoofs. She then came through qualifying to reach the first round of the girls' singles draw at the Australian Open, where she lost to the fifth seed Mananchaya Sawangkaew. She also lost in the first round of doubles.

Ivanov's first senior title came in Port Pirie, South Australia, in February, when she and Marshall defeated the top seeds Jennifer Elie and Alicia Smith in the semifinals before beating Patricia Böntgen and Lisa Mays in the doubles final. A poor run of form in qualifying for singles main draws was only slightly alleviated by reaching the doubles semifinal at a tournament in Heraklion. However, she made her Fed Cup debut for New Zealand in June in the best possible manner, defeating Meheq Khokhar of Pakistan, 6–0, 6–0. She won two singles and three doubles matches as New Zealand finished a disappointing fourth in the tournament.

Although she and Mylène Halemai reached the doubles semifinal of her first tournament when back in Europe, at Alkmaar, she got past the first round of doubles only once more in the season, whilst also getting to the singles main draw only once more in Europe. It took until her last event for the year, in Tucson, Arizona, before she got any further, making it to the quarter-finals but having to default through injury.

In August, Ivanov enrolled at the University of California, Berkeley.

=== 2020 ===
Ivanov began the year at the Auckland Open where her original wildcard into qualifying was upgraded to one in the main draw. Ranked 1,014 at the time of entry, she lost in straight sets to 63rd ranked Jil Teichmann.

She was unbeaten in three singles matches when New Zealand hosted one pool in the 2020 Fed Cup Asia/Oceania Zone Group II in Wellington, before heading back to UC Berkeley to continue her studies. She did not play again before international play was suspended in early March because of the COVID-19 pandemic, and soon afterwards returned to Sydney. Her only subsequent competitive matches were in UTR tournaments in her home city reaching one final, after beating Destanee Aiava in a round-robin match.

== ITF Circuit finals ==
=== Singles: 4 (2 titles, 2 runner-ups) ===
Legend W35 tournaments (0–2) W15 tournaments (2–0)	Finals by surface Hard (1–1) Clay (1–1)

Result	W–L	Date	Tournament	Tier	Surface	Opponent	Score
Win	1–0	Apr 2026	ITF Singapore, Singapore	W15	Hard (i)	(Hong Kong) Cody Wong	6–4, 6–2
Loss	1–1	May 2026	ITF Bol, Croatia	W35	Clay	(Italy) Aurora Zantedeschi	3–6, 2–6
Win	2–1	Jun 2026	ITF Kamen, Germany	W15	Clay	(Germany) Josy Daems	3–6, 6–1, 7–6^{(6)}
Loss	2–2	Sep 2026	ITF Baza, Spain	W35	Hard	(Spain) Charo Esquiva Bañuls	0–6, 2–6

=== Doubles: 9 (7 titles, 2 runner-ups) ===
Legend W35 tournaments (0–1) W15 tournaments (7–1)	Finals by surface Hard (3–1) Clay (4–1)

Result	W–L	Date	Tournament	Tier	Surface	Partner	Opponents	Score
Win	1–0	Feb 2019	ITF Port Pirie, Australia	W15	Hard	(Australia) Amber Marshall	(Germany) Patricia Böntgen (Australia) Lisa Mays	7–5, 6–2
Win	2–0	Jul 2022	ITF Monastir, Tunisia	W15	Hard	(Australia) Lisa Mays	(Chinese Taipei) Cho I-hsuan (China) Yao Xinxin	6–4, 6–7^{(2)}, [10–8]
Win	3–0	Jul 2022	ITF Vejle, Denmark	W15	Clay	(Denmark) Hannah Viller Møller	(Lithuania) Klaudija Bubelyte (Lithuania) Patricija Paukstyte	6–2, 7–6^{(4)}
Loss	3–1	Jun 2024	ITF Alkmaar, Netherlands	W15	Clay	(Denmark) Rebecca Munk Mortensen	(Netherlands) Michaëlla Krajicek (Netherlands) Sarah van Emst	4–6, 4–6
Win	4–1	Jul 2024	ITF Kuršumlijska Banja, Serbia	W15	Clay	(Sweden) Lisa Zaar	(Czech Republic) Michaela Bayerlová (Australia) Jelena Cvijanovic	6–4, 6–7^{(1)}, [10–8]
Win	5–1	Jun 2025	ITF Gdańsk, Poland	W15	Clay	(Denmark) Johanne Svendsen	(Poland) Nadia Affelt (Poland) Inka Wawrzkiewicz	7–5, 3–6, [12–10]
Win	6–1	Jul 2025	ITF Kuršumlijska Banja, Serbia	W15	Clay	(Denmark) Rebecca Munk Mortensen	(Belgium) Lisa Claeys; Milana Zhabrailova	6–1, 6–2
Loss	6–2	Feb 2026	ITF The Hague, Netherlands	W35	Hard (i)	(Denmark) Rebecca Munk Mortensen	(Canada) Ariana Arseneault (Canada) Raphaëlle Lacasse	4–6, 6–3, [5–10]
Win	7–2	Mar 2026	ITF Monastir, Tunisia	W15	Hard	(New Zealand) Elyse Tse	(Germany) Josy Daems; Milana Zhabrailova	6–3, 7–5

== Fed Cup/Billie Jean King Cup results ==
=== Singles (7–10) ===
Result	W–L	Date	Tournament	Surface	Opponent	Score
Win	1–0	2019	Asia/Oceania Group II Kuala Lumpur, Malaysia	Hard	(Pakistan) Meheq Khokhar	6–0, 6–0
Loss	1–1	2019	Asia/Oceania Group II Play-off Kuala Lumpur, Malaysia	Hard	(Malaysia) Sara Nayar	5–7, 5–7
Win	2–1	2020	Asia/Oceania Group II Wellington, New Zealand	Hard	(Mongolia) Bolor Enkhbayar	6–0, 6–0
Win	3–1	2020	Asia/Oceania Group II, Wellington, New Zealand	Hard	(Singapore) Sarah Pang	6–1, 6–1
Win	4–1	2020	Asia/Oceania Group II play-off Wellington, New Zealand	Hard	(Philippines) Shaira Hope Rivera	7–5, 6–1
Loss	4–2	2022	Asia/Oceania Group I Antalya, Turkey	Clay	(South Korea) Jang Su-jeong	3–6, 2–6
Loss	4–3	2022	Asia/Oceania Group I Antalya, Turkey	Clay	(Japan) Yuki Naito	1–6, 2–6
Loss	4–4	2022	Asia/Oceania Group I Antalya, Turkey	Clay	(India) Rutuja Bhosale	1–6, 6–7^{(3)}
Win	5–4	2023	Asia/Oceania Group II Kuala Lumpur, Malaysia	Hard	(Turkmenistan) Aisha Bikbulatova	6–1, 6–1
Win	6–4	2023	Asia/Oceania Group II Kuala Lumpur, Malaysia	Hard	(Indonesia) Fitriana Sabrina	6–1, 6–3
Win	7–4	2023	Asia/Oceania Group II Kuala Lumpur, Malaysia	Hard	(Sri Lanka) Dinethya Dharmaratne	6–0, 6–0
Loss	7–5	2024	Asia/Oceania Group I Changsha, China	Clay	(South Korea) Ku Yeon-woo	4–6, 4–6
Loss	7–6	2024	Asia/Oceania Group I Changsha, China	Clay	(China) Zhu Lin	0–6, 1–6
Loss	7–7	2024	Asia/Oceania Group I Changsha, China	Clay	(Chinese Taipei) Joanna Garland	5–7, 2–6
Loss	7–8	2026	Asia/Oceania Group I New Delhi, India	Hard	(India) Sahaja Yamalapalli	1–6, 3–6
Loss	7–9	2026	Asia/Oceania Group I New Delhi, India	Hard	(South Korea) Back Da-yeon	5–7, 3–6
Loss	7–10	2026	Asia/Oceania Group I New Delhi, India	Hard	(Thailand) Patcharin Cheapchandej	2–6, 6–3, 5–7

=== Doubles (7–2) ===
Result	W–L	Date	Tournament	Surface	Partner	Opponents	Score
Win	1–0	2019	Asia/Oceania Group II Kuala Lumpur, Malaysia	Hard	(New Zealand) Erin Routliffe	(Pakistan) Meheq Khokhar (Pakistan) Noor Malik	6–0, 6–1
Win	2–0	2019	Asia/Oceania Group II Kuala Lumpur, Malaysia	Hard	(New Zealand) Erin Routliffe	(Hong Kong) Ng Kwan-yau (Hong Kong) Wu Ho-ching	6–2, 6–2
Win	3–0	2019	Asia/Oceania Group II Play-off Kuala Lumpur, Malaysia	Hard	(New Zealand) Erin Routliffe	(Malaysia) Sara Nayar (Malaysia) Jawairiah Noordin	6–3, 4–6, 6–3
Win	4–0	2020	Asia/Oceania Group II Wellington, New Zealand	Hard	(New Zealand) Erin Routliffe	(Pakistan) Mahin Qureshi (Pakistan) Ushna Suhail	6–1, 6–0
Loss	4–1	2022	Asia/Oceania Group I Antalya, Turkey	Clay	(New Zealand) Erin Routliffe	(China) Xu Yifan (China) Yang Zhaoxuan	3–6, 1–6
Win	5–1	2023	Asia/Oceania Group II Kuala Lumpur, Malaysia	Hard	(New Zealand) Jade Otway	(Mongolia) Sonomyanzum Enkhjargal (Mongolia) Ninjin Sanchir	6–1, 6–0
Win	6–1	2024	Asia/Oceania Group I Changsha, China	Clay	(New Zealand) Paige Hourigan	(French Polynesia) Mehetia Boosie (Fiji) Ruby Coffin	6–0, 6–1
Win	7–1	2026	Asia/Oceania Group I New Delhi, India	Hard	(New Zealand) Aishi Das	(Indonesia) Anjali Kirana Junarto (Indonesia) Aldila Sutjiadi	4–6, 6–0, [10–6]
Loss	7–2	2026	Asia/Oceania Group I New Delhi, India	Hard	(New Zealand) Aishi Das	(South Korea) Back Da-yeon (South Korea) Lee Eun-hye	3-6, 6–3, [8-10]
