= 2022 Billie Jean King Cup Asia/Oceania Zone Group II – Pool B (Kuala Lumpur) =

Subsection of tennis competition

Pool B (Kuala Lumpur) of the 2022 Billie Jean King Cup Asia/Oceania Zone Group II was one of four pools in the Asia/Oceania zone of the 2022 Billie Jean King Cup. Five teams competed in a round robin competition, with each team proceeding to their respective sections of the play-offs: the top team played for advancement to Group I in 2023.

== Standings ==
		THA	POC	MAS	SGP	MDV	RR; W–L	Set; W–L	Game; W–L	Standings
3	Thailand		3–0	3–0	3–0	3–0	4–0	24–1 (96%)	148–25 (86%)	1
7	Pacific Oceania	0–3		2–1	3–0	3–0	3–1	17–8 (68%)	113–74 (60%)	2
5	Malaysia	0–3	1–2		2–1	3–0	2–2	13–12 (52%)	100–95 (51%)	3
2	Singapore	0–3	0–3	1–2		3–0	1–3	8–17 (32%)	85–119 (42%)	4
–	Maldives	0–3	0–3	0–3	0–3		0–4	0–24 (0%)	11–144 (7%)	5

Standings are determined by: 1. number of wins; 2. number of matches; 3. in two-team ties, head-to-head records; 4. in three-team ties, (a) percentage of matches won (head-to-head records if two teams remain tied), then (b) percentage of sets won (head-to-head records if two teams remain tied), then (c) percentage of games won (head-to-head records if two teams remain tied), then (d) Billie Jean King Cup rankings.

== Round-robin ==
=== Singapore vs. Malaysia ===
Singapore
1
National Tennis Center, Kuala Lumpur, Malaysia
8 August 2022
Hard

Malaysia
2

			1	2	3
1	(Singapore) (Malaysia)	Michelle Yeo; Lim Sze-xuan	2; 6	2; 6
2	(Singapore) (Malaysia)	Sue Yan Tan; Saw Jo-Leen	7; 5	4; 6	6; 4
3	(Singapore) (Malaysia)	Sue Yan Tan / Audrey Tong; Jawairiah Noordin / Hannah Seen Ean Yip	5; 7	2; 6

=== Thailand vs. Pacific Oceania ===
Thailand
3
National Tennis Center, Kuala Lumpur, Malaysia
8 August 2022
Hard

Pacific Oceania
0

			1	2	3
1	(Thailand) (Pacific Oceania)	Anchisa Chanta; Kalani Soli	6; 0	6; 0
2	(Thailand) (Pacific Oceania)	Patcharin Cheapchandej; Violet Apisah	6; 3	6; 2
3	(Thailand) (Pacific Oceania)	Punnin Kovapitukted / Lanlana Tararudee; Kalani Soli / Abigail Tere-Apisah	4; 6	5; 2		retired

=== Singapore vs. Maldives ===
Singapore
3
National Tennis Center, Kuala Lumpur, Malaysia
9 August 2022
Hard

Maldives
0

			1	2	3
1	(Singapore) (Maldives)	Audrey Tong; Nayara Usama Ali	6; 1	6; 0
2	(Singapore) (Maldives)	Sue Yan Tan; Aaraa Aasaal Azim	6; 1	6; 3
3	(Singapore) (Maldives)	Alexis Lara Chua / Michelle Yeo; Sarah Akram / Aaraa Aasaal Azim	6; 0	6; 0

=== Thailand vs. Malaysia ===
Thailand
3
National Tennis Center, Kuala Lumpur, Malaysia
9 August 2022
Hard

Malaysia
0

			1	2	3
1	(Thailand) (Malaysia)	Anchisa Chanta; Saw Jo-Leen	6; 1	6; 1
2	(Thailand) (Malaysia)	Patcharin Cheapchandej; Iman Syuhada Abdullah	6; 0	6; 0
3	(Thailand) (Malaysia)	Chompoothip Jundakate / Punnin Kovapitukted; Jawairiah Noordin / Hannah Seen Ean Yip	6; 2	6; 1

=== Singapore vs. Thailand ===
Singapore
0
National Tennis Center, Kuala Lumpur, Malaysia
10 August 2022
Hard

Thailand
3

			1	2	3
1	(Singapore) (Thailand)	Michelle Yeo; Anchisa Chanta	2; 6	1; 6
2	(Singapore) (Thailand)	Sue Yan Tan; Punnin Kovapitukted	1; 6	1; 6
3	(Singapore) (Thailand)	Sue Yan Tan / Audrey Tong; Chompoothip Jundakate / Lanlana Tararudee	0; 6	1; 6

=== Pacific Oceania vs. Maldives ===
Pacific Oceania
3
National Tennis Center, Kuala Lumpur, Malaysia
10 August 2022
Hard

Maldives
0

			1	2	3
1	(Pacific Oceania) (Maldives)	Kalani Soli; Nayara Usama Ali	6; 0	6; 0
2	(Pacific Oceania) (Maldives)	Violet Apisah; Aaraa Aasaal Azim	6; 0	6; 0
3	(Pacific Oceania) (Maldives)	Patricia Apisah / Violet Apisah; Aaraa Aasaal Azim / Nayara Usama Ali	6; 0	6; 0

=== Singapore vs. Pacific Oceania ===
Singapore
0
National Tennis Center, Kuala Lumpur, Malaysia
11 August 2022
Hard

Pacific Oceania
3

			1	2	3
1	(Singapore) (Pacific Oceania)	Audrey Tong; Kalani Soli	5; 7	5; 7
2	(Singapore) (Pacific Oceania)	Sue Yan Tan; Violet Apisah	0; 6	3; 6
3	(Singapore) (Pacific Oceania)	Alexis Lara Chua / Michelle Yeo; Violet Apisah / Kalani Soli	0; 6	2; 6

=== Malaysia vs. Maldives ===
Malaysia
3
National Tennis Center, Kuala Lumpur, Malaysia
11 August 2022
Hard

Maldives
0

			1	2	3
1	(Malaysia) (Maldives)	Lim Sze-xuan; Nayara Usama Ali	6; 1	6; 0
2	(Malaysia) (Maldives)	Saw Jo-Leen; Aaraa Aasaal Azim	6; 1	6; 0
3	(Malaysia) (Maldives)	Iman Syuhada Abdullah / Hannah Seen Ean Yip; Sarah Akram / Aaraa Aasaal Azim	6; 3	6; 0

=== Thailand vs. Maldives ===
Thailand
3
National Tennis Center, Kuala Lumpur, Malaysia
12 August 2022
Hard

Maldives
0

			1	2	3
1	(Thailand) (Maldives)	Chompoothip Jundakate; Nayara Usama Ali	6; 0	6; 0
2	(Thailand) (Maldives)	Patcharin Cheapchandej; Aaraa Aasaal Azim	6; 0	6; 1
3	(Thailand) (Maldives)	Chompoothip Jundakate / Lanlana Tararudee; Sarah Akram / Aaraa Aasaal Azim	6; 0	6; 0

=== Malaysia vs. Pacific Oceania ===
Malaysia
1
National Tennis Center, Kuala Lumpur, Malaysia
12 August 2022
Hard

Pacific Oceania
2

			1	2	3
1	(Malaysia) (Pacific Oceania)	Lim Sze-xuan; Patricia Apisah	6; 2	6; 0
2	(Malaysia) (Pacific Oceania)	Saw Jo-Leen; Violet Apisah	1; 6	1; 2		retired
3	(Malaysia) (Pacific Oceania)	Jawairiah Noordin / Hannah Seen Ean Yip; Violet Apisah / Kalani Soli	2; 6	3; 6
