= Savanna Ly-Nguyen =

Vietnamese tennis player (born 2000)

- Native name: Savanna Lý Nguyễn
- Country (sports): Vietnam
- Born: 25 August 2000 (age 26) Brampton, Ontario, Canada
- Height: 1.52 m (5 ft 0 in)
- Turned pro: 2017
- Plays: Right-handed (one-handed backhand)
- College: Washington State University

Singles
- Career titles: 0
- Highest ranking: No. 808 (24 July 2023)

Doubles
- Career titles: 0 (1 ITF)
- Highest ranking: No. 874 (9 December 2024)
Medal record
Southeast Asian Games
| Silver medal – second place | 2019 Manila | Women's singles |
| Silver medal – second place | 2021 Hanoi | Women's team |
| Bronze medal – third place | 2023 Phnom Penh | Women's singles |
| Bronze medal – third place | 2023 Phnom Penh | Women's team |

Savanna Ly-Nguyen (Vietnamese: Savanna Lý Nguyễn; born 25 August 2000) is a Vietnamese tennis player. Born in Brampton, Ontario, Canada, to Vietnamese parents, she obtained Vietnamese citizenship in 2017 and represents Vietnam in international competition. She reached career-high WTA rankings of world No. 808 in singles on 24 July 2023 and No. 874 in doubles on 9 December 2024. In 2024, she won her first ITF Women's World Tennis Tour title, capturing the doubles event at an ITF W15 tournament in Monastir, Tunisia, with Japan's Michika Ozeki.

Representing Vietnam at the Southeast Asian Games, Ly-Nguyen has won four medals. She earned the women's singles silver medal at the 2019 SEA Games, after reaching the final against Indonesia's Aldila Sutjiadi, and won women's-team silver at the 2021 SEA Games. At the 2023 SEA Games, she added bronze medals in the women's singles and women's team events. She has also represented Vietnam at the Asian Games and in the Billie Jean King Cup.

From 2018 to 2022, Ly-Nguyen played college tennis for the Washington State Cougars women's team. She finished with a 73–35 singles record and a 29–17 doubles record, received All-Pac-12 honorable mention in 2022, and was selected as a 2021 Arthur Ashe Jr. Sports Scholar.
