= Brunei Billie Jean King Cup team =

Bruneian women's tennis team

The Brunei Fed Cup team represents Brunei in Billie Jean King Cup tennis competition and are governed by the Brunei Darussalam Tennis Association. They have not competed since 1996.

== History ==
Brunei competed in its first (and thus far, only) Billie Jean King Cup/Fed Cup in 1996, losing all three of its Group II ties.

== See also ==
- Billie Jean King Cup
- Brunei Davis Cup team
