= Tajikistan Billie Jean King Cup team =

Tajikistan
- Nations Ranking: NR (14 November 2016)
- First year: 1998
- Years played: 3
- Ties played (W–L): 14 (9–5)
- Best finish: Zonal Group II RR
- Most total wins: Eugenia Silantieva (10–2)
- Most singles wins: Eugenia Silantieva (5–2)
- Most doubles wins: Eugenia Silantieva (5–0); Youliya Dimitrova (5–0)
- Best doubles team: Eugenia Silantieva / Youliya Dimitrova (5–0)
- Most ties played: Zihaida Shantalova (8); Shahlio Ibadullaeva (8)
- Most years played: Eugenia Silantieva (2); Youliya Dimitrova (2); Zihaida Shantalova (2)

The Tajikistan Fed Cup team represents Tajikistan in Fed Cup tennis competition and are governed by the National Tennis Federation of the Republic of Tajikistan. They have not competed since 2017.

== History ==
Tajikistan competed in its first Fed Cup in 1998. Their best result was finishing third in Group II on three occasions.

== Players ==
Name	Years	First	Ties	Win – Loss		
Name	Years	First	Ties	Singles	Doubles	Total
Roxana Abdurakhmonova	1	2000	5	0–1	3–1	3–2
Takhmina Burkhanova	1	2017	4	2–2	0–1	2–3
Shahlio Ibadullaeva	2	1999	8	3–3	2–2	5–5
Diana Ivanikhina	1	2019	2	0–2	0–2	0–4
Kamila Mulloeva	1	2017	3	0–0	0–2	0–2
Ramina Mulloeva	1	2019	1	0–0	0–1	0–1
Youliya Dimitrova	2	1998	8	4–3	5–0	9–3
Zihaida Shantalova	2	1999	8	3–2	3–3	6–5
Tamanno Sharipova	1	2019	2	0–0	0–2	0–2
Eugenia Silantieva	2	1998	8	5–2	5–0	10–2
Anastasiya Tursunova	2	2017	7	4–3	0–2	4–5
Nargizakhon Yakhyaeva	2	2017	4	0–1	0–2	0–3

== See also ==
- Billie Jean King Cup
- Tajikistan Davis Cup team
