= Guam Billie Jean King Cup team =

Guamanian women's tennis team

Guam
- Captain: Samuel Lai
- Nations Ranking: NR (4 February 2019)
- First year: 2020
- Years played: 1
- Ties played (W–L): 1 (0–1)

The Guam Billie Jean King Cup team represents Guam in Billie Jean King Cup tennis competition and are governed by the Guam National Tennis Federation. They took part in the Fed Cup for the first time in 2020, competing in the Asia/Oceania Zone Group II. They lost their first Fed Cup match against the Philippines with their first win being their 3-0 victory over Turkmenistan in their second Fed Cup game. Prior to their Fed Cup debut in 2020, Guam was previously affiliated with the Pacific Oceania team.

== Players ==
Year	Team		
2020	Nadine Del Carmen	Katrina Lai	Charlayne Espinosa

== See also ==
- Billie Jean King Cup
- Guam Davis Cup team
