= Mongolia Billie Jean King Cup team =

Mongolia
- Captain: Z Enkhbold
- ITF ranking: 55
- First year: 2021
- Years played: 3
- Ties played (W–L): 14 (9–5)
- Most total wins: Maralgoo Chogsomjav (15–3)
- Most singles wins: Maralgoo Chogsomjav (9–1)
- Most doubles wins: Maralgoo Chogsomjav (6–2)
- Most ties played: Maralgoo Chogsomjav (6–2)
- Most years played: Jargal Altansarnai (2)

The Mongolia Fed Cup team represents Mongolia in Fed Cup tennis competition and are governed by the Mongolian Tennis Association. They took part in the Billie Jean King Cup for the first time in 2020-21, competing in the Asia/Oceania Zone Group II. They currently compete in the Africa Zone of Group III.

== Players ==
Year	Team			
2020-21	Jargal Altansarnai	Erdenesuren Erdenebat	Bolor Enkhbayar	Shinejargal Battur
2022	Jargal Altansarnai	Maralgoo Chogsomjav	Martaa Chogsomjav	
2023	Maralgoo Chogsomjav	Martaa Chogsomjav	Sonomyanzum Enkhjargal	Ninjin Sanchir

== See also ==
- Billie Jean King Cup
- Mongolia Davis Cup team
