= Bermet Duvanaeva =

Kyrgyzstani tennis player

Bermet Duvanaeva Бермет Дуванаева
- Country (sports): Kyrgyzstan
- Born: 28 January 1988 (age 38) Frunze, Kirghiz SSR, Soviet Union
- Plays: Right-handed (two-handed backhand)
- Prize money: $19,871

Singles
- Career record: 81–71
- Career titles: 1 ITF
- Highest ranking: No. 449 (30 July 2012)

Doubles
- Career record: 15–29
- Highest ranking: No. 820 (13 September 2010)

Team competitions
- Fed Cup: 16–8

Bermet Duvanaeva (Kyrgyz: Бермет Дуванаева; born 28 January 1988) is a former tennis player from Kyrgyzstan.

In her career, Duvanaeva won one singles title on the ITF Women's Circuit. On 30 July 2012, she reached her best singles ranking of world No. 449. On 13 September 2010, she peaked at No. 820 in the doubles rankings.

Playing for Kyrgyzstan in the Fed Cup, Duvanaeva has a win–loss record of 16–8.

== ITF Circuit finals ==
=== Singles: 3 (1 title, 2 runner-ups) ===
Legend $50,000 tournaments $25,000 tournaments $10,000 tournaments	Finals by surface Hard (0–2) Clay (1–0)

Result	W–L	Date	Tournament	Tier	Surface	Opponent	Score
Win	1–0	Aug 2011	ITF Charleroi, Belgium	10,000	Clay	(Bulgaria) Martina Gledacheva	2–6, 7–5, 6–1
Loss	1–1	Oct 2011	ITF Almaty, Kazakhstan	10,000	Hard (i)	(Russia) Alexandra Artamonova	4–6, 6–2, 3–6
Loss	1–2	Jul 2012	ITF İzmir, Turkey	10,000	Hard	(Russia) Yuliya Kalabina	6–4, 2–6, 3–6

== Fed Cup participation ==
=== Singles (11–4) ===
Edition	Stage	Date	Location	Against	Surface	Opponent	W/L	Score
2010 Fed Cup; Asia/Oceania Zone Group II	R/R	3 February 2010	Kuala Lumpur, Malaysia	(Philippines) Philippines	Hard	(Philippines) Michelle Pang	W	6–2, 6–1
2010 Fed Cup; Asia/Oceania Zone Group II	R/R	4 February 2010	Kuala Lumpur, Malaysia	Syria	Hard	(Syria) Kim Sadi	W	6–1, 6–1
2010 Fed Cup; Asia/Oceania Zone Group II	R/R	5 February 2010	Kuala Lumpur, Malaysia	Hong Kong	Hard	(Hong Kong) Yang Zi-jun	L	1–6, 7–5, 1–6
2010 Fed Cup; Asia/Oceania Zone Group II	P/O	6 February 2010	Kuala Lumpur, Malaysia	India	Hard	(India) Rushmi Chakravarthi	L	4–6, 6–1, 3–6
2012 Fed Cup; Asia/Oceania Zone Group II	R/R	30 January 2012	Shenzhen, China	(Pakistan) Pakistan	Hard	(Pakistan) Saba Aziz	W	6–1, 6–1
2012 Fed Cup; Asia/Oceania Zone Group II	R/R	1 February 2012	Shenzhen, China	(Singapore) Singapore	Hard	(Singapore) Geraldine Ang	W	6–0, 6–1
2012 Fed Cup; Asia/Oceania Zone Group II	R/R	2 February 2012	Shenzhen, China	(Sri Lanka) Sri Lanka	Hard	(Sri Lanka) Thisuri Molligoda	W	6–0, 6–3
2012 Fed Cup; Asia/Oceania Zone Group II	R/R	3 February 2012	Shenzhen, China	(Hong Kong) Hong Kong	Hard	(Hong Kong) Zhang Ling	W	6–3, 4–6, 6–1
2012 Fed Cup; Asia/Oceania Zone Group II	P/O	4 February 2012	Shenzhen, China	Philippines	Hard	(Philippines) Tamitha Nguyen	W	6–4, 6–3
2013 Fed Cup; Asia/Oceania Zone Group II	R/R	4 February 2013	Astana, Kazakhstan	(Pakistan) Pakistan	Hard (i)	(Pakistan) Ushna Suhail	W	6–1, 6–1
2013 Fed Cup; Asia/Oceania Zone Group II	R/R	5 February 2013	Astana, Kazakhstan	(Malaysia) Malaysia	Hard (i)	(Malaysia) Theiviya Selvarajoo	W	6–1, 6–1
2013 Fed Cup; Asia/Oceania Zone Group II	R/R	6 February 2013	Astana, Kazakhstan	(Indonesia) Indonesia	Hard (i)	(Indonesia) Ayu-Fani Damayanti	L	6–3, 3–6, 4–6
2013 Fed Cup; Asia/Oceania Zone Group II	R/R	7 February 2013	Astana, Kazakhstan	(Iran) Iran	Hard (i)	(Iran) Ghazaleh Torkaman	W	6–1, 6–4
2013 Fed Cup; Asia/Oceania Zone Group II	R/R	8 February 2013	Astana, Kazakhstan	(Philippines) Philippines	Hard (i)	(Philippines) Anna Clarice Patrimonio	W	6–2, 6–3
2013 Fed Cup; Asia/Oceania Zone Group II	P/O	9 February 2013	Astana, Kazakhstan	Turkmenistan	Hard (i)	(Turkmenistan) Anastasiya Prenko	L	3–6, 6–3, 0–6

=== Doubles (5–4) ===
Edition	Stage	Date	Location	Against	Surface	Partner	Opponents	W/L	Score
2010 Fed Cup; Asia/Oceania Zone Group II	R/R	3 February 2010	Kuala Lumpur, Malaysia	Philippines	Hard	(Kyrgyzstan) Ksenia Palkina	(Philippines) Anna Christine Patrimonio (Philippines) Marinel Rudas	W	6–2, 6–1
2010 Fed Cup; Asia/Oceania Zone Group II	R/R	5 February 2010	Kuala Lumpur, Malaysia	Hong Kong	Hard	(Kyrgyzstan) Ksenia Palkina	(Hong Kong) Yang Zi-jun (Hong Kong) Zhang Ling	W	7–5, 7–5
2010 Fed Cup; Asia/Oceania Zone Group II	P/O	6 February 2010	Kuala Lumpur, Malaysia	India	Hard	(Kyrgyzstan) Nelli Buyuklianova	(India) Sanaa Bhambri (India) Rushmi Chakravarthi	L	0–6, 0–1 ret.
2012 Fed Cup; Asia/Oceania Zone Group II	R/R	30 January 2012	Shenzhen, China	Pakistan	Hard	(Kyrgyzstan) Inna Volkovich	(Pakistan) Sara Mansoor (Pakistan) Ushna Suhail	W	7–5, 6–0
2012 Fed Cup; Asia/Oceania Zone Group II	R/R	2 February 2012	Shenzhen, China	Sri Lanka	Hard	(Kyrgyzstan) Zhamilia Duisheeva	(Sri Lanka) Nilushi Fernando (Sri Lanka) Roshenka Fernando	W	6–0, 6–3
2012 Fed Cup; Asia/Oceania Zone Group II	R/R	3 February 2012	Shenzhen, China	Hong Kong	Hard	(Kyrgyzstan) Inna Volkovich	(Hong Kong) Yang Zi-jung (Hong Kong) Zhang Ling	L	1–6, 1–6
2013 Fed Cup; Asia/Oceania Zone Group II	R/R	4 February 2013	Astana, Kazakhstan	Pakistan	Hard (i)	(Kyrgyzstan) Arina Beliaeva	(Pakistan) Iman Qureshi (Pakistan) Ushna Suhail	W	6–0, 6–2
2013 Fed Cup; Asia/Oceania Zone Group II	R/R	5 February 2013	Astana, Kazakhstan	Malaysia	Hard (i)	(Kyrgyzstan) Arina Beliaeva	(Malaysia) Aslina Chua (Malaysia) Theiviya Selvarajoo	L	6–2, 4–6, 2–6
2013 Fed Cup; Asia/Oceania Zone Group II	R/R	8 February 2013	Astana, Kazakhstan	Philippines	Hard (i)	(Kyrgyzstan) Arina Beliaeva	(Philippines) Marian Jade Capadocia (Philippines) Anna Clarice Patrimonio	L	5–7, 5–7
