= 2012 Fed Cup Asia/Oceania Group II – Pool A =

Group A of the 2012 Fed Cup Asia/Oceania Zone Group II was one of two pools in the Asia/Oceania zone of the 2012 Fed Cup. Five teams competed in a round robin competition, with the teams proceeding to their respective sections of the play-offs: the top team played for advancement to the 2013 Group I.

		(Hong Kong) HKG	(Singapore) SIN	(Kyrgyzstan) KGZ	(Pakistan) PAK	(Sri Lanka) SRI	RR; W–L	Set; W–L	Game; W–L	Standings
51	Hong Kong		3–0	2–1	3–0	3–0	4–0	23–2	143–26	1
64	Singapore	0–3		1–2	1–2	2–1	1–3	9–18	84–136	3
68	Kyrgyzstan	1–2	2–1		3–0	3–0	3–1	19–8	132–90	2
78	Pakistan	0–3	2–1	0–3		1–2	2–2	7–18	91–131	4
91	Sri Lanka	0–3	1–2	0–3	2–1		0–4	6–18	44–161	5

== Singapore vs. Sri Lanka ==
Singapore
2
Shenzhen Luohu Tennis Centre, Shenzhen, China
January 30, 2012
Hard (outdoors)

Sri Lanka
1

			1	2	3
1	(Singapore) (Sri Lanka)	Hannah En Zin Chew; Roshenko Fernando	6; 4	6; 3
2	(Singapore) (Sri Lanka)	Geraldine Ang; Thisuri Molligoda	1; 6	3; 6
3	(Singapore) (Sri Lanka)	Geraldine Ang / Olivia Koh Ee Yi; Nilushi Fernando / Roshenko Fernando	6; 4	6; 4

== Kyrgyzstan vs. Pakistan ==
Kyrgyzstan
3
Shenzhen Luohu Tennis Centre, Shenzhen, China
January 30, 2012
Hard (outdoors)

Pakistan
0

			1	2	3
1	(Kyrgyzstan) (Pakistan)	Inna Volkovich; Ushna Suhail	6; 4	6; 3
2	(Kyrgyzstan) (Pakistan)	Bermet Duvanaeva; Saba Aziz	6; 1	6; 1
3	(Kyrgyzstan) (Pakistan)	Bermet Duvanaeva / Inna Volkovich; Sara Mansoor / Ushna Suhail	7; 5	6; 0

== Hong Kong vs. Sri Lanka ==
Hong Kong
3
Shenzhen Luohu Tennis Centre, Shenzhen, China
January 31, 2012
Hard (outdoors)

Sri Lanka
0

			1	2	3
1	(Hong Kong) (Sri Lanka)	Chan Wing-yau; Nilushi Fernando	6; 1	6; 0
2	(Hong Kong) (Sri Lanka)	Zhang Ling; Roshenko Fernando	6; 0	6; 1
3	(Hong Kong) (Sri Lanka)	Eudice Chong / Yang Zi-Jun; Nilushi Fernando / Thisuri Molligoda	6; 1	6; 0

== Singapore vs. Pakistan ==
Singapore
1
Shenzhen Luohu Tennis Centre, Shenzhen, China
January 31, 2012
Hard (outdoors)

Pakistan
2

			1	2	3
1	(Singapore) (Pakistan)	Hannah En Zin Chew; Ushna Suhail	1; 6	4; 6
2	(Singapore) (Pakistan)	Geraldine Ang; Saba Aziz	4; 6	6; 0	6; 2
3	(Singapore) (Pakistan)	Geraldine Ang / Olivia Koh Ee Yi; Sara Mansoor / Ushna Suhail	3; 6	4; 6

== Hong Kong vs. Pakistan ==
Hong Kong
3
Shenzhen Luohu Tennis Centre, Shenzhen, China
February 1, 2012
Hard (outdoors)

Pakistan
0

			1	2	3
1	(Hong Kong) (Pakistan)	Chan Wing-yau; Ushna Suhail	6; 1	6; 2
2	(Hong Kong) (Pakistan)	Zhang Ling; Saba Aziz	6; 0	6; 0
3	(Hong Kong) (Pakistan)	Yang Zi-Jun / Ling Zhang; Sara Mansoor / Ushna Suhail	6; 1	6; 1

== Singapore vs. Kyrgyzstan ==
Singapore
1
Shenzhen Luohu Tennis Centre, Shenzhen, China
February 1, 2012
Hard (outdoors)

Kyrgyzstan
2

			1	2	3
1	(Singapore) (Kyrgyzstan)	Hannah En Zin Chew; Inna Volkovich	2; 6	7^{7} 6^{4}	3; 6
2	(Singapore) (Kyrgyzstan)	Geraldine Ang; Bermet Duvanaeva	0; 6	1; 6
3	(Singapore) (Kyrgyzstan)	Rehmat Johal / Olivia Koh Ee Yi; Zhamilia Duisheeva / Emilia Tenizbaeva	6; 1	2; 6	6; 4

== Hong Kong vs. Singapore ==
Hong Kong
3
Shenzhen Luohu Tennis Centre, Shenzhen, China
February 2, 2012
Hard (outdoors)

Singapore
0

			1	2	3
1	(Hong Kong) (Singapore)	Chan Wing-yau; Hannah En Zin Chew	6; 0	6; 0
2	(Hong Kong) (Singapore)	Zhang Ling; Geraldine Ang	6; 0	6; 0
3	(Hong Kong) (Singapore)	Eudice Chong / Yang Zi-Jun; Rehmat Johal / Olivia Koh Ee Yi	6; 1	6; 0

== Kyrgyzstan vs. Sri Lanka ==
Kyrgyzstan
3
Shenzhen Luohu Tennis Centre, Shenzhen, China
February 2, 2012
Hard (outdoors)

Sri Lanka
0

			1	2	3
1	(Kyrgyzstan) (Sri Lanka)	Inna Volkovich; Nilushi Fernando	6; 4	7; 5
2	(Kyrgyzstan) (Sri Lanka)	Bermet Duvanaeva; Thisuri Molligoda	6; 0	6; 3
3	(Kyrgyzstan) (Sri Lanka)	Zhamilia Duisheeva / Bermet Duvanaeva; Nilushi Fernando / Roshenko Fernando	6; 2	6; 0

== Hong Kong vs. Kyrgyzstan ==
Hong Kong
2
Shenzhen Luohu Tennis Centre, Shenzhen, China
February 3, 2012
Hard (outdoors)

Kyrgyzstan
1

			1	2	3
1	(Hong Kong) (Kyrgyzstan)	Chan Wing-yau; Inna Volkovich	6; 0	6; 0
2	(Hong Kong) (Kyrgyzstan)	Zhang Ling; Bermet Duvanaeva	6; 3	4; 6	1; 6
3	(Hong Kong) (Kyrgyzstan)	Yang Zi-Jun / Zhang Ling; Bermet Duvanaeva / Inna Volkovich	6; 1	6; 1

== Pakistan vs. Sri Lanka ==
Pakistan
1
Shenzhen Luohu Tennis Centre, Shenzhen, China
February 3, 2012
Hard (outdoors)

Sri Lanka
2

			1	2	3
1	(Pakistan) (Sri Lanka)	Ushna Suhail; Roshenko Fernando	6; 3	6; 1
2	(Pakistan) (Sri Lanka)	Saba Aziz; Thisuri Molligoda	4; 6	5; 7
3	(Pakistan) (Sri Lanka)	Sara Mansoor / Ushna Suhail; Nilushi Fernando / Thisuri Molligoda	4; 6	5; 7
