= Clarice Patrimonio =

Filipino tennis player (born 1993)

Personal information
- National team: Philippines
- Born: Anna Clarice Conwi Patrimonio; November 25, 1993 (age 32) Manila, Philippines
- Home town: Cainta, Rizal
- Years active: Until 2023 (tennis); 2023–present (pickleball)
- Children: 1
- Parent: Alvin Patrimonio (father)
- Relative: Christine (sister)
- Tennis career
- Country (sports): Philippines
- Retired: 2023
- Plays: Right-handed (two-handed backhand)
- University: National University
- Prize money: $441

Singles
- Career record: 2–2

Doubles
- Career record: 1–1

Team competitions
- Fed Cup: 30–19
- Last updated on: February 08, 2020.

Sport
- Sport: Tennis; Pickleball
Achievements and titles
Women's Tennis
Representing Philippines
Southeast Asian Games
Silver medal – second place	2015 Singapore	Team
Silver medal – second place	2017 Kuala Lumpur	Singles
Bronze medal – third place	2011 Palembang	Singles
Bronze medal – third place	2011 Palembang	Team

Anna Clarice Conwi Patrimonio (born November 25, 1993, in Manila) is a Filipina pickleball player and a former tennis player.

== Early life ==
Clarice Patrimonio was born on November 25, 1993 in Manila, Philippines to basketball player Alvin Patrimonio and Cindy Conwi. She has a brother and a sister. She took up tennis at around five years old.

== Career ==
=== Tennis ===
Patrimonio started representing the Philippines in international competitions in 2011. She played for the Philippine Fed Cup Team at the 2011 Fed Cup, Patrimonio has a win–loss record of 30–19.

She has played at the SEA Games, representing her country in the 2011 edition in Jakarta and Palembang, Indonesia, the 2017 edition in Kuala Lumpur, and the 2019 edition in the Philippines.

At the collegiate level, Patrimonio has played for the NU Lady Bulldogs in the University Athletic Association of the Philippines (UAAP). She has played alongside her sister Tin.

The COVID-19 pandemic disrupted her career. Patrimonio competed in her last tennis tournament at the Philippine Columbian Association (PCA) in 2023.

=== Pickleball ===
Patrimonio later shifted from tennis to pickleball, playing a first game of the latter also at the PCA in 2023. As part of the Makati Pickleball Club, Patrimonio competed at the 2023 World Pickleball Championship in Bali, Indonesia and won a bronze medal.

This was followed by a gold and three bronzes in the 2024 edition and a women's singles gold in the 2025 edition.

At the Philippine Pickleball League Open, Patrimonio finished as the champion in the women's singles and women's doubles of the 2026 edition.

=== Pageantry ===
Representing Cainta, Rizal, Patrimonio joined the Mutya ng Pilipinas 2018 pageant. She was named one of the five Ambassadors of Air Travel and Tours.

== Personal life ==
Clarice Patrimonio is a mother giving birth to her daughter in 2020.

== Fed Cup Result: (30–19) ==
=== Singles: (13–13) ===
Outcome	No.	Edition	Date	Against	Surface	Opponent	Score
Runner-up	1.	2011 Fed Cup; Asia/Oceania Zone II	February 2011	Indonesia	Hard	(Indonesia) Ayu-Fani Damayanti	4–6, 2–6
Winner	2.	2011 Fed Cup; Asia/Oceania Zone II	February 2011	Kyrgyzstan	Hard	(Kyrgyzstan) Zhamilia Duisheeva	6–1, 6–1
Winner	3.	2011 Fed Cup; Asia/Oceania Zone II	February 2011	Pakistan	Hard	(Pakistan) Sarah Mahboob Khan	6–4, 6–0
Winner	4.	2011 Fed Cup; Asia/Oceania Zone II	February 2011	Singapore	Hard	(Singapore) Clare Fong	6–1, 6–1
Runner-up	5.	2012 Fed Cup; Asia/Oceania Zone II	February 2012	Oman	Hard	(Oman) Fatma Al Nabhani	6–1, 4–6, 3–6
Runner-up	6.	2012 Fed Cup; Asia/Oceania Zone II	February 2012	Turkmenistan	Hard	(Turkmenistan) Anastasiya Prenko	5–7, 6–1, 2–6
Winner	7.	2012 Fed Cup; Asia/Oceania Zone II	February 2012	India	Hard	(India) Prerna Bhambri	3–6, 6–4, 6–2
Runner-up	8.	2013 Fed Cup; Asia/Oceania Zone II	February 2013	Indonesia	Hard (i)	(Indonesia) Lavinia Tananta	3–6, 1–6
Winner	9.	2013 Fed Cup; Asia/Oceania Zone II	February 2013	Malaysia	Hard (i)	(Malaysia) Theiviya Selvarajoo	6–2, 6–3
Winner	10.	2013 Fed Cup; Asia/Oceania Zone II	February 2013	Pakistan	Hard (i)	(Pakistan) Saba Aziz	6–2, 6–1
Runner-up	11.	2013 Fed Cup; Asia/Oceania Zone II	February 2013	Kyrgyzstan	Hard (i)	(Kyrgyzstan) Bermet Duvanaeva	2–6, 3–6
Runner-up	12.	2013 Fed Cup; Asia/Oceania Zone II	February 2013	New Zealand	Hard (i)	(New Zealand) Abigail Guthrie	0–6, 3–6
Winner	13.	2014 Fed Cup; Asia/Oceania Zone II	February 2014	Singapore	Hard (i)	(Singapore) Geraldine Ang	6–3, 6–0
Winner	14.	2014 Fed Cup; Asia/Oceania Zone II	February 2014	Sri Lanka	Hard (i)	(Sri Lanka) Medhira Samarasinghe	6–1, 6–0
Winner	15.	2014 Fed Cup; Asia/Oceania Zone II	February 2014	Turkmenistan	Hard (i)	(Turkmenistan) Jahana Bayramova	6–2, 6–0
Runner-up	16.	2014 Fed Cup; Asia/Oceania Zone II	February 2014	Hong Kong	Hard (i)	(Hong Kong) Eudice Chong	4–6, 1–6
Winner	17.	2015 Fed Cup; Asia/Oceania Zone II	April 2015	Singapore	Hard	(Singapore) Angeline Devi Devanthiran	7–6^{(5)}, 7–5
Runner-up	18.	2015 Fed Cup; Asia/Oceania Zone II	April 2015	Indonesia	Hard	(Indonesia) Lavinia Tananta	3–6, 1–6
Runner-up	19.	2015 Fed Cup; Asia/Oceania Zone II	April 2015	India	Hard	(India) Prarthana Thombare	3–6, 1–6
Runner-up	20.	2016 Fed Cup; Asia/Oceania Zone II	April 2016	Pacific Oceania	Hard	(Papua New Guinea) Abigail Tere-Apisah	1–6, 0–6
Winner	21.	2016 Fed Cup; Asia/Oceania Zone II	April 2016	Bahrain	Hard	(Bahrain) Maram Mohamed Sharif	6–0, 6–0
Runner-up	22.	2017 Fed Cup; Asia/Oceania Zone I	February 2017	China	Hard (i)	(China) Zhang Kailin	2–6, 2–6
Runner-up	23.	2018 Fed Cup; Asia/Oceania Zone II	February 2018	Singapore	Hard (i)	(Singapore) Charmaine Shi Yi Seah	3–6, 7–6, 1–6
Winner	24.	2020 Fed Cup; Asia/Oceania Zone II	February 2020	Guam	Hard (i)	(Guam) Katrina Lai	6–3, 6–2
Runner-up	25.	2020 Fed Cup; Asia/Oceania Zone II	February 2020	Thailand	Hard (i)	(Thailand) Anchisa Chanta	1–6, 4–6
Winner	26.	2020 Fed Cup; Asia/Oceania Zone II	February 2020	Turkmenistan	Hard (i)	(Turkmenistan) Arzuv Klycheva	6–1, 6–2

=== Doubles: (17–6) ===
Outcome	No.	Edition	Date	Against	Surface	Partner	Opponents	Score
Runner-up	1.	2011 Fed Cup; Asia/Oceania Zone II	February 2011	Indonesia	Hard	(Philippines) Tamitha Nguyen	(Indonesia) Yayuk Basuki (Indonesia) Jessy Rompies	1–6, 2–6
Winner	2.	2011 Fed Cup; Asia/Oceania Zone II	February 2011	Singapore	Hard	(Philippines) Tamitha Nguyen	(Singapore) Clare Fong (Singapore) Stefanie Tan	6–2, 6–2
Winner	3.	2012 Fed Cup; Asia/Oceania Zone II	February 2012	Iran	Hard	(Philippines) Tamitha Nguyen	(Iran) Madona Najarian (Iran) Ghazaleh Torkaman	6–0, 6–1
Winner	4.	2012 Fed Cup; Asia/Oceania Zone II	February 2012	Oman	Hard	(Philippines) Marian Jade Capadocia	(Oman) Fatma Al Nabhani (Oman) Maliha Al Awaidy	6–0, 6–3
Winner	5.	2012 Fed Cup; Asia/Oceania Zone II	February 2012	Turkmenistan	Hard	(Philippines) Tamitha Nguyen	(Turkmenistan) Jenneta Halliyeva (Turkmenistan) Anastasiya Prenko	6–1, 6–1
Runner-up	6.	2012 Fed Cup; Asia/Oceania Zone II	February 2012	India	Hard	(Philippines) Tamitha Nguyen	(India) Isha Lakhani (India) Sania Mirza	0–6, 1–6
Winner	7.	2012 Fed Cup; Asia/Oceania Zone II	February 2012	Kyrgyzstan	Hard	(Philippines) Marian Jade Capadocia	(Kyrgyzstan) Zhamilia Duisheeva (Kyrgyzstan) Emilia Tenizbaeva	6–1, 6–1
Runner-up	8.	2013 Fed Cup; Asia/Oceania Zone II	February 2013	Indonesia	Hard (i)	(Philippines) Marian Jade Capadocia	(Indonesia) Aldila Sutjiadi (Indonesia) Lavinia Tananta	2–6, 0–6
Winner	9.	2013 Fed Cup; Asia/Oceania Zone II	February 2013	Iran	Hard (i)	(Philippines) Marinel Rudas	(Iran) Sahar Najaei (Iran) Ghazaleh Torkaman	6–0, 6–0
Winner	10.	2013 Fed Cup; Asia/Oceania Zone II	February 2013	Pakistan	Hard (i)	(Philippines) Marian Jade Capadocia	(Pakistan) Sara Mansoor (Pakistan) Iman Qureshi	6–2, 6–3
Winner	11.	2013 Fed Cup; Asia/Oceania Zone II	February 2013	Kyrgyzstan	Hard (i)	(Philippines) Marian Jade Capadocia	(Kyrgyzstan) Arina Beliaeva (Kyrgyzstan) Bermet Duvanaeva	7–5, 7–5
Winner	12.	2014 Fed Cup; Asia/Oceania Zone II	February 2014	Singapore	Hard (i)	(Philippines) Marian Jade Capadocia	(Singapore) Rheeya Doshi (Singapore) Geraldine Ang	6–1, 6–1
Winner	13.	2014 Fed Cup; Asia/Oceania Zone II	February 2014	Sri Lanka	Hard (i)	(Philippines) Marian Jade Capadocia	(Sri Lanka) Kemalie Herath (Sri Lanka) Amreetha Muttiah	6–1, 6–1
Winner	14.	2014 Fed Cup; Asia/Oceania Zone II	February 2014	Turkmenistan	Hard (i)	(Philippines) Marian Jade Capadocia	(Turkmenistan) Jahana Bayramova (Turkmenistan) Guljahan Kadyrova	6–1, 6–1
Winner	15.	2014 Fed Cup; Asia/Oceania Zone II	February 2014	Hong Kong	Hard (i)	(Philippines) Marian Jade Capadocia	(Hong Kong) Ng Kwan-yau (Hong Kong) Wu Ho-ching	7–5, 6–3
Winner	16.	2015 Fed Cup; Asia/Oceania Zone II	April 2015	Singapore	Hard (i)	(Philippines) Katharina Lehnert	(Singapore) Angeline Devi Devanthiran (Singapore) Sarah Pang	6–1, 6–2
Winner	17.	2015 Fed Cup; Asia/Oceania Zone II	April 2015	Indonesia	Hard (i)	(Philippines) Katharina Lehnert	(Indonesia) Ayu Fani Damayanti (Indonesia) Lavinia Tananta	6–7^{(12)}, 6–4, 6–2
Runner-up	18.	2015 Fed Cup; Asia/Oceania Zone II	April 2015	India	Hard (i)	(Philippines) Katharina Lehnert	(India) Sania Mirza (India) Prarthana Thombare	3–6, 3–6
Winner	19.	2016 Fed Cup; Asia/Oceania Zone II	April 2016	Iran	Hard	(Philippines) Khim Iglupas	(Iran) Sara Amiri (Iran) Sadaf Sadeghvaziri	6–1, 6–4
Runner-up	20.	2016 Fed Cup; Asia/Oceania Zone II	April 2016	Hong Kong	Hard	(Philippines) Khim Iglupas	(Hong Kong) Ng Man-ying (Hong Kong) Sher Chun-wing	4–6, 5–7
Runner-up	21.	2017 Fed Cup; Asia/Oceania Zone I	February 2017	Japan	Hard (i)	(Philippines) Khim Iglupas	(Japan) Shuko Aoyama (Japan) Eri Hozumi	2–6, 1–6
Winner	22.	2018 Fed Cup; Asia/Oceania Zone II	February 2018	Kyrgyzstan	Hard	(Philippines) Katharina Lehnert	(Kyrgyzstan) Kanykey Koichumanova (Kyrgyzstan) Ksenia Palkina	6–4, 6–3
Winner	23.	2018 Fed Cup; Asia/Oceania Zone II	February 2018	Oman	Hard	(Philippines) Katharina Lehnert	(Oman) Maryam Al Balushi (Oman) Aisha Al Suleimani	6–1, 6–0
