= Sara Mansoor =

Pakistani tennis player (born 1988)

Sara Mansoor سارہ منصور
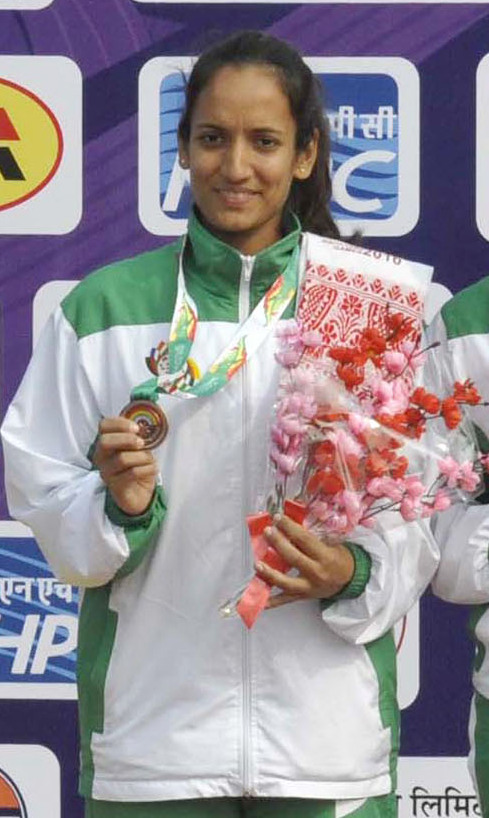
- Country (sports): Pakistan
- Born: 31 January 1988 (age 38) Rawalpindi, Pakistan
- Plays: Right-handed (two-handed backhand)

Singles
- Career record: 1–7

Doubles
- Career record: 2–14
Medal record
Representing Pakistan
South Asian Games
Bronze medal – third place	2016 Guwahati	Singles

Sara Mansoor (Urdu: سارہ منصور; born 30 January 1985 in Rawalpindi) is a Pakistani tennis player.

Playing for Pakistan at the Fed Cup, Mansoor has a win–loss record of 6–23.

== Early life ==
Mansoor was born in Rawalpindi and started playing tennis aged 13. Favourite Surface Clay.

== Career ==
In 2011, she along with Sarah Mahboob Khan, Ushna Suhail and Saba Aziz made history as Pakistan re-entered the Fed Cup competition after a decade of absence.

Mansoor ın 2016, Guwahati won South Asian Games Bronze Medalist in singles.

== Fed Cup participation ==
=== Singles ===
Edition	Date	Location	Against	Surface	Opponent	W/L	Score
2013 Fed Cup; Asia/Oceania Zone II	4 February 2013	Astana, Kazakhstan	(Kyrgyzstan) Kyrgyzstan	Hard	(Kyrgyzstan) Sabina Korsunova	W	7–6^{(7–2)}, 6–1
2013 Fed Cup; Asia/Oceania Zone II	5 February 2013	Astana, Kazakhstan	Indonesia	Hard	(Indonesia) Aldila Sutjiadi	L	0–6, 1–6
2013 Fed Cup; Asia/Oceania Zone II	9 February 2013	Astana, Kazakhstan	Singapore	Hard	(Singapore) Geraldine Ang	L	4–6, 1–6
2014 Fed Cup; Asia/Oceania Zone II	4 February 2014	Astana, Kazakhstan	(New Zealand) New Zealand	Hard	(New Zealand) Marina Erakovic	L	0–6, 1–6
2014 Fed Cup; Asia/Oceania Zone II	5 February 2014	Astana, Kazakhstan	India	Hard	(India) Ankita Raina	L	1–6, 2–6
2014 Fed Cup; Asia/Oceania Zone II	6 February 2014	Astana, Kazakhstan	Iran	Hard	(Iran) Sara Amini	L	3–6, 1–6
2015 Fed Cup; Asia/Oceania Zone II	15 April 2015	Hyderabad, India	India	Hard	(India) Prarthana Thombare	L	1–6, 0–6
2016 Fed Cup; Asia/Oceania Zone II	12 April 2016	Hua Hin, Thailand	(Malaysia) Malaysia	Hard	(Malaysia) Nurin Nabilah Roslan	L	3–6, 4–6
2016 Fed Cup; Asia/Oceania Zone II	13 April 2016	Hua Hin, Thailand	Kyrgyzstan	Hard	(Kyrgyzstan) Alina Lazareva	W	6–4, ret.
2016 Fed Cup; Asia/Oceania Zone II	14 April 2016	Hua Hin, Thailand	Indonesia	Hard	(Indonesia) Lavinia Tananta	L	0–6, 0–6
2016 Fed Cup; Asia/Oceania Zone II	15 April 2016	Hua Hin, Thailand	(Sri Lanka) Sri Lanka	Hard	(Sri Lanka) Amreetha Muttiah	L	3–6, 0–6

=== Doubles ===
Edition	Date	Location	Against	Surface	Partner	Opponents	W/L	Score
2011 Fed Cup; Asia/Oceania Zone II	2 February 2011	Nonthaburi, Thailand	(Indonesia) Indonesia	Hard	(Pakistan) Saba Aziz	(Indonesia) Yayuk Basuki (Indonesia) Jessy Rompies	L	0–6, 0–6
2011 Fed Cup; Asia/Oceania Zone II	4 February 2011	Nonthaburi, Thailand	Philippines	Hard	(Pakistan) Saba Aziz	(Philippines) Anna Christine Patrimonio (Philippines) Marinel Rudas	L	0–6, 1–6
2012 Fed Cup; Asia/Oceania Zone II	30 January 2012	Shenzhen, China	(Kyrgyzstan) Kyrgyzstan	Hard	(Pakistan) Ushna Suhail	(Kyrgyzstan) Bermet Duvanaeva (Kyrgyzstan) Inna Volkovich	L	5–7, 0–6
2012 Fed Cup; Asia/Oceania Zone II	31 January 2012	Shenzhen, China	Singapore	Hard	(Pakistan) Ushna Suhail	(Singapore) Geraldine Ang (Singapore) Olivia Koh Ee Yi	W	6–3, 6–4
2012 Fed Cup; Asia/Oceania Zone II	1 February 2012	Shenzhen, China	Hong Kong	Hard	(Pakistan) Ushna Suhail	(Hong Kong) Yang Zi-Jun (Hong Kong) Zhang Ling	L	1–6, 1–6
2012 Fed Cup; Asia/Oceania Zone II	3 February 2012	Shenzhen, China	Sri Lanka	Hard	(Pakistan) Ushna Suhail	(Sri Lanka) Nilushi Fernando (Sri Lanka) Thisuri Molligoda	L	4–6, 5–7
2012 Fed Cup; Asia/Oceania Zone II	4 February 2012	Shenzhen, China	Oman	Hard	(Pakistan) Ushna Suhail	(Oman) Sarah Al Balushi (Oman) Fatma Al Nabhani	L	2–6, 6–7^{(7–9)}
2013 Fed Cup; Asia/Oceania Zone II	5 February 2013	Astana, Kazakhstan	(Indonesia) Indonesia	Hard	(Pakistan) Iman Qureshi	(Indonesia) Ayu Fani Damayanti (Indonesia) Lavinia Tananta	L	0–6, 1–6
2013 Fed Cup; Asia/Oceania Zone II	6 February 2013	Astana, Kazakhstan	Iran	Hard	(Pakistan) Iman Qureshi	(Iran) Sahar Najaei (Iran) Arezou Youlghouni	W	6–0, 6–0
2013 Fed Cup; Asia/Oceania Zone II	7 February 2013	Astana, Kazakhstan	Philippines	Hard	(Pakistan) Iman Qureshi	(Philippines) Marian Jade Capadocia (Philippines) Anna Clarice Patrimonio	L	2–6, 3–6
2013 Fed Cup; Asia/Oceania Zone II	8 February 2013	Astana, Kazakhstan	Malaysia	Hard	(Pakistan) Ushna Suhail	(Malaysia) Alyssa Boey (Malaysia) Theiviya Selvarajoo	L	2–6, 6–3, 3–6
2013 Fed Cup; Asia/Oceania Zone II	9 February 2013	Astana, Kazakhstan	(Singapore) Singapore	Hard	(Pakistan) Saba Aziz	(Singapore) Rheeya Doshi (Singapore) Wee Khee-yen	L	6–3, 2–6, 6–7^{(2–7)}
2014 Fed Cup; Asia/Oceania Zone II	5 February 2014	Astana, Kazakhstan	(India) India	Hard	(Pakistan) Ushna Suhail	(India) Sania Mirza (India) Prarthana Thombare	L	2–6, 1–6
2014 Fed Cup; Asia/Oceania Zone II	6 February 2014	Astana, Kazakhstan	Iran	Hard	(Pakistan) Ushna Suhail	(Iran) Sahar Amini Hajibashi (Iran) Ghazal Pakbaten	L	6–7^{(8–10)}, 6–3, 5–7
2015 Fed Cup; Asia/Oceania Zone II	14 April 2015	Hyderabad, India	(Malaysia) Malaysia	Hard	(Pakistan) Ushna Suhail	(Malaysia) Jawairiah Noordin (Malaysia) Yus Syazlin Nabila Binti Yusri	L	0–6, 2–6
2016 Fed Cup; Asia/Oceania Zone II	11 April 2016	Hua Hin, Thailand	(Singapore) Singapore	Hard	(Pakistan) Ushna Suhail	(Singapore) Goh Yee-loon (Singapore) Ashley Kei Yim	W	6–1, 4–6, 7–6^{(7–2)}
2016 Fed Cup; Asia/Oceania Zone II	14 April 2016	Hua Hin, Thailand	(Indonesia) Indonesia	Hard	(Pakistan) Ushna Suhail	(Indonesia) Beatrice Gumulya (Indonesia) Jessy Rompies	L	1–6, 1–6
2016 Fed Cup; Asia/Oceania Zone II	16 April 2015	Hua Hin, Thailand	Bahrain	Hard	(Pakistan) Ushna Suhail	(Bahrain) Malak Jasim Fardan (Bahrain) Nazli Nader Redha	W	6–0, 6–0
