= 2013 Fed Cup Asia/Oceania Zone Group II – Pool B =

Group B of the 2013 Fed Cup Asia/Oceania Zone Group II was one of two pools in the Asia/Oceania zone of the 2013 Fed Cup. Five teams competed in a round robin competition, with the teams proceeding to their respective sections of the play-offs: the top team played for advancement to the 2014 Group I.

== Standings ==
| | | (Philippines) PHI | (Indonesia) INA | (Kyrgyzstan) KGZ | (Pakistan) PAK | (Malaysia) MAS | (Iran) IRI | RR; W–L | Match; W–L | Set; W–L | Game; W–L |
| 53 | Philippines | | 0–3 | 2–1 | 3–0 | 3–0 | 3–0 | 11–4 | 22–9 | 140–101 | 2 |
| 56 | Indonesia | 3–0 | | 3–0 | 3–0 | 3–0 | 3–0 | 15–0 | 30–1 | 167–26 | 1 |
| 63 | Kyrgyzstan | 1–2 | 0–3 | | 2–1 | 1–2 | 3–0 | 7–8 | 16–17 | 138–130 | 4 |
| 75 | Pakistan | 0–3 | 0–3 | 1–2 | | 0–3 | 3–0 | 4–11 | 8–23 | 93–168 | 5 |
| 82 | Malaysia | 0–3 | 0–3 | 2–1 | 3–0 | | 3–0 | 8–7 | 16–16 | 124–128 | 3 |
| 94 | Iran | 0–3 | 0–3 | 0–3 | 0–3 | 0–3 | | 0–15 | 2–30 | 47–188 | 6 |

== Round robin ==
=== Philippines vs. Indonesia ===
Philippines
0
National Tennis Centre, Astana, Kazakhstan
February 4, 2013
RuKortHard Tournament F Hard (indoors)

Indonesia
3

| | | | 1 | 2 | 3 |
|---|---|---|---|---|---|
| 1 | (Philippines) (Indonesia) | Anna Clarice Patrimonio; Lavinia Tananta | 3; 6 | 1; 6 |
| 2 | (Philippines) (Indonesia) | Marinel Rudas; Ayu Fani Damayanti | 0; 6 | 0; 6 |
| 3 | (Philippines) (Indonesia) | Marian Jade Capadocia / Anna Clarice Patrimonio; Aldila Sutjiadi / Lavinia Tananta | 2; 6 | 0; 6 |

=== Kyrgyzstan vs. Pakistan ===
Kyrgyzstan
2
National Tennis Centre, Astana, Kazakhstan
February 4, 2013
RuKortHard Tournament F Hard (indoors)

Pakistan
1

| | | | 1 | 2 | 3 |
|---|---|---|---|---|---|
| 1 | (Kyrgyzstan) (Pakistan) | Sabina Korsunova; Sara Mansoor | 6^{2} 7^{7} | 1; 6 |
| 2 | (Kyrgyzstan) (Pakistan) | Bermet Duvanaeva; Ushna Suhail | 6; 1 | 6; 1 |
| 3 | (Kyrgyzstan) (Pakistan) | Arina Beliaeva / Bermet Duvanaeva; Iman Qureshi / Ushna Suhail | 6; 0 | 6; 2 |

=== Malaysia vs. Iran ===
Malaysia
3
National Tennis Centre, Astana, Kazakhstan
February 4, 2013
RuKortHard Tournament F Hard (indoors)

Iran
0

| | | | 1 | 2 | 3 |
|---|---|---|---|---|---|
| 1 | (Malaysia) (Iran) | Aslina Chua; Arezou Youlghouni | 6; 0 | 6; 0 |
| 2 | (Malaysia) (Iran) | Theiviya Selvarajoo; Ghazaleh Torkaman | 6; 2 | 6; 1 |
| 3 | (Malaysia) (Iran) | Alyssa Boey / Nurin Nabilah Roslan; Maryam Mazaheri / Sahar Najaei | 6; 1 | 6; 1 |

=== Philippines vs. Iran ===
Philippines
3
National Tennis Centre, Astana, Kazakhstan
February 5, 2013
RuKortHard Tournament F Hard (indoors)

Iran
0

| | | | 1 | 2 | 3 |
|---|---|---|---|---|---|
| 1 | (Philippines) (Iran) | Marian Jade Capadocia; Sahar Najaei | 6; 2 | 6; 2 |
| 2 | (Philippines) (Iran) | Marinel Rudas; Ghazaleh Torkaman | 6; 2 | 6; 1 |
| 3 | (Philippines) (Iran) | Anna Clarice Patrimonio / Marinel Rudas; Sahar Najaei / Ghazaleh Torkaman | 6; 0 | 6; 0 |

=== Indonesia vs. Pakistan ===
Indonesia
3
National Tennis Centre, Astana, Kazakhstan
February 5, 2013
RuKortHard Tournament F Hard (indoors)

Pakistan
0

| | | | 1 | 2 | 3 |
|---|---|---|---|---|---|
| 1 | (Indonesia) (Pakistan) | Aldila Sutjiadi; Sara Mansoor | 6; 0 | 6; 1 |
| 2 | (Indonesia) (Pakistan) | Ayu Fani Damayanti; Ushna Suhail | 6; 0 | 6; 0 |
| 3 | (Indonesia) (Pakistan) | Ayu Fani Damayanti / Lavinia Tananta; Sara Mansoor / Iman Qureshi | 6; 0 | 6; 1 |

=== Kyrgyzstan vs. Malaysia ===
Kyrgyzstan
1
National Tennis Centre, Astana, Kazakhstan
February 5, 2013
RuKortHard Tournament F Hard (indoors)

Malaysia
2

| | | | 1 | 2 | 3 |
|---|---|---|---|---|---|
| 1 | (Kyrgyzstan) (Malaysia) | Arina Beliaeva; Aslina Chua | 0; 6 | 2; 6 |
| 2 | (Kyrgyzstan) (Malaysia) | Bermet Duvanaeva; Theiviya Selvarajoo | 6; 1 | 6; 1 |
| 3 | (Kyrgyzstan) (Malaysia) | Arina Beliaeva / Bermet Duvanaeva; Aslina Chua / Theiviya Selvarajoo | 6; 2 | 4; 6 | 2; 6 |

=== Philippines vs. Malaysia ===
Philippines
3
National Tennis Centre, Astana, Kazakhstan
February 6, 2013
RuKortHard Tournament F Hard (indoors)

Malaysia
0

| | | | 1 | 2 | 3 |
|---|---|---|---|---|---|
| 1 | (Philippines) (Malaysia) | Marian Jade Capadocia; Aslina Chua | 7; 5 | 6; 4 |
| 2 | (Philippines) (Malaysia) | Anna Clarice Patrimonio; Theiviya Selvarajoo | 6; 2 | 6; 3 |
| 3 | (Philippines) (Malaysia) | Marian Jade Capadocia / Marinel Rudas; Alyssa Boey / Nurin Nabilah Roslan | 6; 0 | 6; 1 |

=== Indonesia vs. Kyrgyzstan ===
Indonesia
3
National Tennis Centre, Astana, Kazakhstan
February 6, 2013
RuKortHard Tournament F Hard (indoors)

Kyrgyzstan
0

| | | | 1 | 2 | 3 |
|---|---|---|---|---|---|
| 1 | (Indonesia) (Kyrgyzstan) | Lavinia Tananta; Sabina Korsunova | 6; 0 | 6; 0 |
| 2 | (Indonesia) (Kyrgyzstan) | Ayu Fani Damayanti; Bermet Duvanaeva | 3; 6 | 6; 3 | 6; 4 |
| 3 | (Indonesia) (Kyrgyzstan) | Aldila Sutjiadi / Lavinia Tananta; Arina Beliaeva / Sabina Korsunova | 6; 1 | 6; 0 |

=== Pakistan vs. Iran ===
Pakistan
3
National Tennis Centre, Astana, Kazakhstan
February 6, 2013
RuKortHard Tournament F Hard (indoors)

Iran
0

| | | | 1 | 2 | 3 |
|---|---|---|---|---|---|
| 1 | (Pakistan) (Iran) | Saba Aziz; Maryam Mazaheri | 7; 5 | 6; 0 |
| 2 | (Pakistan) (Iran) | Ushna Suhail; Ghazaleh Torkaman | 6^{5} 7^{7} | 6; 3 | 7; 5 |
| 3 | (Pakistan) (Iran) | Sara Mansoor / Iman Qureshi; Sahar Najaei / Arezou Youlghouni | 6; 0 | 6; 0 |

=== Philippines vs. Pakistan ===
Philippines
3
National Tennis Centre, Astana, Kazakhstan
February 7, 2013
RuKortHard Tournament F Hard (indoors)

Pakistan
0

| | | | 1 | 2 | 3 |
|---|---|---|---|---|---|
| 1 | (Philippines) (Pakistan) | Anna Clarice Patrimonio; Saba Aziz | 6; 2 | 6; 1 |
| 2 | (Philippines) (Pakistan) | Marinel Rudas; Ushna Suhail | 4; 6 | 6; 4 | 6; 0 |
| 3 | (Philippines) (Pakistan) | Marian Jade Capadocia / Anna Clarice Patrimonio; Sara Mansoor / Iman Qureshi | 6; 2 | 6; 3 |

=== Indonesia vs. Malaysia ===
Indonesia
3
National Tennis Centre, Astana, Kazakhstan
February 7, 2013
RuKortHard Tournament F Hard (indoors)

Malaysia
0

| | | | 1 | 2 | 3 |
|---|---|---|---|---|---|
| 1 | (Indonesia) (Malaysia) | Aldila Sutjiadi; Aslina Chua | 6; 2 | 6; 0 |
| 2 | (Indonesia) (Malaysia) | Ayu Fani Damayanti; Theiviya Selvarajoo | 6; 1 | 6; 0 |
| 3 | (Indonesia) (Malaysia) | Ayu Fani Damayanti / Lavinia Tananta; Alyssa Boey / Nurin Nabilah Roslan | 6; 0 | 6; 1 |

=== Kyrgyzstan vs. Iran ===
Kyrgyzstan
3
National Tennis Centre, Astana, Kazakhstan
February 7, 2013
RuKortHard Tournament F Hard (indoors)

Iran
0

| | | | 1 | 2 | 3 |
|---|---|---|---|---|---|
| 1 | (Kyrgyzstan) (Iran) | Arina Beliaeva; Sahar Najaei | 6; 1 | 6; 0 |
| 2 | (Kyrgyzstan) (Iran) | Bermet Duvanaeva; Ghazaleh Torkaman | 6; 1 | 6; 4 |
| 3 | (Kyrgyzstan) (Iran) | Arina Beliaeva / Bermet Duvanaeva; Sahar Najaei / Ghazaleh Torkaman | 6; 0 | 6^{4} 7^{7} | 6; 2 |

=== Philippines vs. Kyrgyzstan ===
Philippines
2
National Tennis Centre, Astana, Kazakhstan
February 8, 2013
RuKortHard Tournament F Hard (indoors)

Kyrgyzstan
1

| | | | 1 | 2 | 3 |
|---|---|---|---|---|---|
| 1 | (Philippines) (Kyrgyzstan) | Marian Jade Capadocia; Arina Beliaeva | 6; 2 | 6; 1 |
| 2 | (Philippines) (Kyrgyzstan) | Anna Clarice Patrimonio; Bermet Duvanaeva | 2; 6 | 3; 6 |
| 3 | (Philippines) (Kyrgyzstan) | Marian Jade Capadocia / Anna Clarice Patrimonio; Arina Beliaeva / Bermet Duvanaeva | 7; 5 | 7; 5 |

=== Indonesia vs. Iran ===
Indonesia
3
National Tennis Centre, Astana, Kazakhstan
February 8, 2013
RuKortHard Tournament F Hard (indoors)

Iran
0

| | | | 1 | 2 | 3 |
|---|---|---|---|---|---|
| 1 | (Indonesia) (Iran) | Aldila Sutjiadi; Arezou Youlghouni | 6; 0 | 6; 0 |
| 2 | (Indonesia) (Iran) | Lavinia Tananta; Maryam Mazaheri | 6; 0 | 6; 0 |
| 3 | (Indonesia) (Iran) | Ayu Fani Damayanti / Aldila Sutjiadi; Sahar Najaei / Maryam Mazaheri | 6; 0 | 6; 0 |

=== Pakistan vs. Malaysia ===
Pakistan
0
National Tennis Centre, Astana, Kazakhstan
February 8, 2013
RuKortHard Tournament F Hard (indoors)

Malaysia
3

| | | | 1 | 2 | 3 |
|---|---|---|---|---|---|
| 1 | (Pakistan) (Malaysia) | Iman Qureshi; Aslina Chua | 6^{7} 7^{9} | 5; 7 |
| 2 | (Pakistan) (Malaysia) | Ushna Suhail; Theiviya Selvarajoo | 2; 6 | 0; 6 |
| 3 | (Pakistan) (Malaysia) | Sara Mansoor / Ushna Suhail; Alyssa Boey / Theiviya Selvarajoo | 2; 6 | 6; 3 | 3; 6 |
