= Ushna Suhail =

Pakistani tennis player

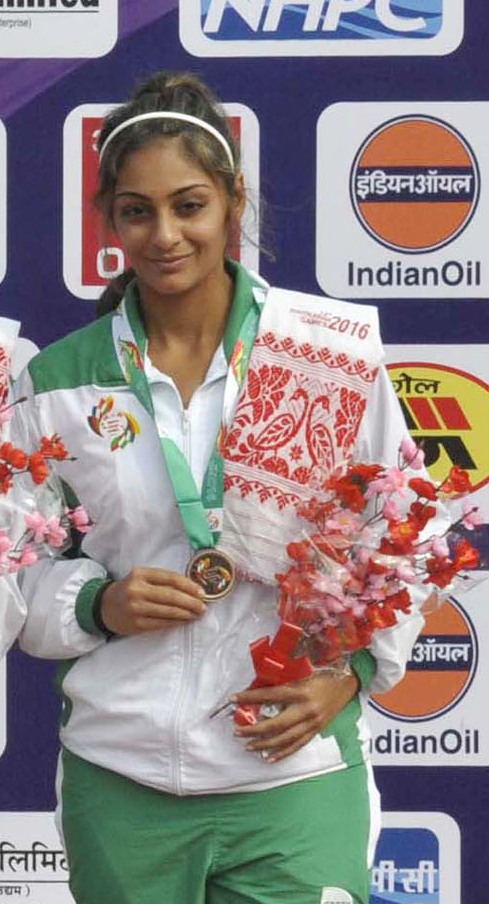
- Country (sports): Pakistan
- Born: 26 June 1993 (age 33) Lahore, Pakistan
- Turned pro: 2011
- Plays: Right Handed (Double Handed Backhand)
- Prize money: US$ 7,966

Singles
- Career record: 14 - 47
- Career titles: 0
- Highest ranking: No. 943 (12 December 2016)

Doubles
- Career record: 15 - 48
- Highest ranking: No. 864 (11 July 2016)
Medal record
Representing Pakistan
South Asian Games
Bronze medal – third place	2016 Guwahati	Singles
Bronze medal – third place	2016 Guwahati	Mixed

Ushna Suhail TI (born 26 June 1993 in Lahore) is a female tennis player from Pakistan. She is Pakistan's highest-ranked female player and the country's only woman to achieve a WTA ranking, conferred with the Tamgha-e-Imtiaz in 2023 and the first Pakistani to receive the ITF Billie Jean King Cup Commitment Award. In October 2026, she partnered with Mahin Aftab Qureshi to become part of the first Pakistani pair to win a doubles match at a World Tennis Women's Futures tournament, defeating their opponents 6-0, 6-0.

On 11 July 2016, she peaked at world number 864 in the doubles rankings.

Playing for Pakistan at the Fed Cup, Suhail has a win–loss of 24–42.

Suhail is a cousin of Aisam-ul-Haq Qureshi.

== Career ==
Suhail represents Pakistan and competes on the ITF Pro Circuit tour. South Asian Games Double Bronze Medalist in singles and mixed doubles, Pakistan's first world-ranked female tennis player in singles and doubles.

=== 2014 ===
In September 2014, Suhail along with Sara Mansoor became the first women tennis players from Pakistan to participate at the Asian Games when they competed at the Asian Games being held in Incheon, South Korea. 2015 she made to the semi-finals of three tournaments at Sharm el-Sheikh futures.

== Fed Cup participation ==
=== Singles: (12-22) ===
Outcome	No.	Date	Edition	Surface	Against	Opponent	Score
Winner	1.	February 2011	2011 Fed Cup; Asia/Oceania Zone II	Hard	Kyrgyzstan	(Kyrgyzstan) Emilia Tenizbaeva	6–1, 6–1
Runner-up	2.	February 2011	2011 Fed Cup; Asia/Oceania Zone II	Hard	Indonesia	(Indonesia) Ayu-Fani Damayanti	1–6, 0–6
Runner-up	3.	February 2011	2011 Fed Cup; Asia/Oceania Zone II	Hard	Philippines	(Philippines) Tamitha Nguyen	7–5, 3–6, 3-6
Winner	4.	February 2011	2011 Fed Cup; Asia/Oceania Zone II	Hard	Turkmenistan	(Turkmenistan) Amangul Mollayeva	6–1, 6–0
Runner-up	5.	January 2012	2012 Fed Cup; Asia/Oceania Zone II	Hard	Kyrgyzstan	(Kyrgyzstan) Inna Volkovich	4–6, 3–6
Winner	6.	January 2012	2012 Fed Cup; Asia/Oceania Zone II	Hard	Singapore	(Singapore) Hannah En Xin Chew	6–1, 6–4
Runner-up	7.	February 2012	2012 Fed Cup; Asia/Oceania Zone II	Hard	Hong Kong	(Hong Kong) Venise Chan	1–6, 2–6
Winner	8.	February 2012	2012 Fed Cup; Asia/Oceania Zone II	Hard	Sri Lanka	(Sri Lanka) Roshenko Fernando	6–3, 6–1
Winner	9.	February 2012	2012 Fed Cup; Asia/Oceania Zone II	Hard	Oman	(Oman) Sarah Al Balushi	6–0, 6–0
Runner-up	10.	February 2013	2013 Fed Cup; Asia/Oceania Zone II	Hard	Kyrgyzstan	(Kyrgyzstan) Bermet Duvanaeva	1–6, 1–6
Runner-up	11.	February 2013	2013 Fed Cup; Asia/Oceania Zone II	Hard	Indonesia	(Indonesia) Ayu-Fani Damayanti	0–6, 0–6
Winner	12.	February 2013	2013 Fed Cup; Asia/Oceania Zone II	Hard	Iran	(Iran) Ghazaleh Torkaman	6-7^{(5)}, 6–3, 7-5
Runner-up	13.	February 2013	2013 Fed Cup; Asia/Oceania Zone II	Hard	Philippines	(Philippines) Marinel Rudas	6–4, 4–6, 0–6
Runner-up	14.	February 2013	2013 Fed Cup; Asia/Oceania Zone II	Hard	Malaysia	(Malaysia) Theiviya Selvarajoo	2–6, 0–6
Runner-up	15.	February 2013	2013 Fed Cup; Asia/Oceania Zone II	Hard	Singapore	(Singapore) Rheeya Doshi	2–6, 6–4, 4-6
Runner-up	16.	February 2014	2014 Fed Cup; Asia/Oceania Zone II	Hard	New Zealand	(New Zealand) Dianne Hollands	1–6, 0–6
Runner-up	17.	February 2014	2014 Fed Cup; Asia/Oceania Zone II	Hard	India	(India) Prarthana Thombare	0–6, 1–6
Winner	18.	February 2014	2014 Fed Cup; Asia/Oceania Zone II	Hard	Iran	(Iran) Ghazaleh Torkaman	6–3, 6–2
Runner-up	19.	April 2015	2015 Fed Cup; Asia/Oceania Zone II	Hard	Malaysia	(Malaysia) Jawairiah Noordin	2–6, 0–6
Runner-up	20.	April 2015	2015 Fed Cup; Asia/Oceania Zone II	Hard	India	(India) Ankita Raina	0–6, 1–6
Winner	21.	April 2015	2015 Fed Cup; Asia/Oceania Zone II	Hard	Kyrgyzstan	(Kyrgyzstan) Eliza Askarova	3–6, 6–0, 6-1
Runner-up	22.	April 2016	2016 Fed Cup; Asia/Oceania Zone II	Hard	Singapore	(Singapore) Stefanie Tan	0–6, 3–6
Runner-up	23.	April 2016	2016 Fed Cup; Asia/Oceania Zone II	Hard	Malaysia	(Malaysia) Jawairiah Noordin	1–6, 2–6
Winner	24.	April 2016	2016 Fed Cup; Asia/Oceania Zone II	Hard	Kyrgyzstan	(Kyrgyzstan) Nelli Buyuklianova	6–1, 6–0
Runner-up	25.	April 2016	2016 Fed Cup; Asia/Oceania Zone II	Hard	Sri Lanka	(Sri Lanka) Nethmi Himashi Waduge	0–6, 2–6
Winner	26.	April 2016	2016 Fed Cup; Asia/Oceania Zone II	Hard	Bahrain	(Bahrain) Maram Mohamed Sharif	6–0, 6–0
Runner-up	27.	July 2017	2017 Fed Cup; Asia/Oceania Zone II	Hard	Malaysia	(Malaysia) Theiviya Selvarajoo	1–6, 6–2, 4-6
Runner-up	28.	July 2017	2017 Fed Cup; Asia/Oceania Zone II	Hard	Singapore	(Singapore) Nicole Y-kit Tan	6-2, 3–6, 5-7
Runner-up	29.	July 2017	2017 Fed Cup; Asia/Oceania Zone II	Hard	Iran	(Iran) Ghazal Pakbaten	4–6, 2–6
Runner-up	30.	February 2018	2018 Fed Cup; Asia/Oceania Zone II	Hard	Sri Lanka	(Sri Lanka) Anika Seneviratne	3-6, 6–4, 3-6
Runner-up	31.	February 2018	2018 Fed Cup; Asia/Oceania Zone II	Hard	Indonesia	(Indonesia) Beatrice Gumulya	2–6, 0–6
Runner-up	32.	February 2018	2018 Fed Cup; Asia/Oceania Zone II	Hard	New Zealand	(New Zealand) Erin Routliffe	3–6, 1–6
Winner	33.	February 2020	2020 Fed Cup; Asia/Oceania Zone II	Hard	Mongolia	(Mongolia) Jargal Altansarnai	6-3, 6-0
Winner	34.	February 2020	2020 Fed Cup; Asia/Oceania Zone II	Hard	Singapore	(Singapore) Sarah Pang	6–0, 6–0

=== Doubles: (10-16) ===
Outcome	No.	Date	Edition	Against	Surface	Partner	Opponents	Score
Winner	1.	February 2011	2011 Fed Cup; Asia/Oceania Zone II	Kyrgyzstan	Hard	(Pakistan) Sarah Mahboob Khan	(Kyrgyzstan) Zhamilia Duisheeva (Kyrgyzstan) Emilia Tenizbaeva	6–4, 6–2
Runner-up	2.	February 2011	2011 Fed Cup; Asia/Oceania Zone II	Turkmenistan	Hard	(Pakistan) Sarah Mahboob Khan	(Turkmenistan) Jenneta Halliyeva (Turkmenistan) Anastasiya Prenko	2–6, 2–6
Runner-up	3.	January 2012	2012 Fed Cup; Asia/Oceania Zone II	Kyrgyzstan	Hard	(Pakistan) Sara Mansoor	(Kyrgyzstan) Bermet Duvanaeva (Kyrgyzstan) Inna Volkovich	5–7, 0–6
Winner	4.	January 2012	2012 Fed Cup; Asia/Oceania Zone II	Singapore	Hard	(Pakistan) Sara Mansoor	(Singapore) Geraldine Ang (Singapore) Olivia Koh Ee Yi	6–3, 6–4
Runner-up	5.	February 2012	2012 Fed Cup; Asia/Oceania Zone II	Hong Kong	Hard	(Pakistan) Sara Mansoor	(Hong Kong) Yang Zi-Jun (Hong Kong) Zhang Ling	1–6, 1–6
Runner-up	6.	February 2012	2012 Fed Cup; Asia/Oceania Zone II	Sri Lanka	Hard	(Pakistan) Sara Mansoor	(Sri Lanka) Nilushi Fernando (Sri Lanka) Thisuri Molligoda	4–6, 5–7
Runner-up	7.	February 2012	2012 Fed Cup; Asia/Oceania Zone II	Oman	Hard	(Pakistan) Sara Mansoor	(Oman) Sarah Al Balushi (Oman) Fatma Al Nabhani	2–6, 6–7^{(9)}
Runner-up	8.	February 2013	2013 Fed Cup; Asia/Oceania Zone II	Kyrgyzstan	Hard	(Pakistan) Iman Qureshi	(Kyrgyzstan) Arina Beliaeva (Kyrgyzstan) Bermet Duvanaeva	0–6, 2–6
Runner-up	9.	February 2013	2013 Fed Cup; Asia/Oceania Zone II	Malaysia	Hard	(Pakistan) Sara Mansoor	(Malaysia) Alyssa Boey (Malaysia) Theiviya Selvarajoo	2–6, 6–3, 3-6
Runner-up	10.	February 2014	2014 Fed Cup; Asia/Oceania Zone II	India	Hard	(Pakistan) Sara Mansoor	(India) Sania Mirza (India) Prarthana Thombare	2–6, 1–6
Runner-up	11.	February 2014	2014 Fed Cup; Asia/Oceania Zone II	Iran	Hard	(Pakistan) Sara Mansoor	(Iran) Sahar Amini Hajibashi (Iran) Ghazal Pakbaten	6-7^{(10)}, 6–3, 5-7
Runner-up	12.	April 2015	2015 Fed Cup; Asia/Oceania Zone II	Malaysia	Hard	(Pakistan) Sara Mansoor	(Malaysia) Jawairiah Noordin (Malaysia) Yus Syazlin Nabila Binti Yusri	0–6, 2–6
Runner-up	13.	April 2015	2015 Fed Cup; Asia/Oceania Zone II	India	Hard	(Pakistan) Iman Qureshi	(India) Natasha Palha (India) Prarthana Thombare	0–6, 4–6
Winner	14.	April 2016	2016 Fed Cup; Asia/Oceania Zone II	Singapore	Hard	(Pakistan) Sara Mansoor	(Singapore) Goh Yee-loon (Singapore) Ashley Kei Yim	6–1, 4–6, 7-6^{(2)}
Runner-up	15.	April 2016	2016 Fed Cup; Asia/Oceania Zone II	Malaysia	Hard	(Pakistan) Sarah Mahboob Khan	(Malaysia) Jawairiah Noordin (Malaysia) Theiviya Selvarajoo	3–6, 0–6
Winner	16.	April 2016	2016 Fed Cup; Asia/Oceania Zone II	Kyrgyzstan	Hard	(Pakistan) Sarah Mahboob Khan	(Kyrgyzstan) Nelli Buyuklianova (Kyrgyzstan) Alina Lazareva	w/o
Runner-up	17.	April 2016	2016 Fed Cup; Asia/Oceania Zone II	Indonesia	Hard	(Pakistan) Sara Mansoor	(Indonesia) Beatrice Gumulya (Indonesia) Jessy Rompies	1–6, 1–6
Winner	18.	April 2016	2016 Fed Cup; Asia/Oceania Zone II	Bahrain	Hard	(Pakistan) Sara Mansoor	(Bahrain) Malak Jasim Fardan (Bahrain) Nazli Nader Redha	6–0, 6–0
Runner-up	19.	July 2017	2017 Fed Cup; Asia/Oceania Zone II	Singapore	Hard	(Pakistan) Mahin Qureshi	(Singapore) Angela Shan Min Lim (Singapore) Charmaine Shi Yi Seah	3–6, 7–5, 6-7^{(2)}
Winner	20.	July 2017	2017 Fed Cup; Asia/Oceania Zone II	Iran	Hard	(Pakistan) Sarah Mahboob Khan	(Iran) Sara Amiri (Iran) Ghazal Pakbaten	6–3, 7–5
Winner	21.	February 2018	2018 Fed Cup; Asia/Oceania Zone II	Sri Lanka	Hard	(Pakistan) Mahin Qureshi	(Sri Lanka) Anika Seneviratne (Sri Lanka) Nethmi Himashi Waduge	6–1, 6-4
Runner-up	22.	February 2018	2018 Fed Cup; Asia/Oceania Zone II	Indonesia	Hard	(Pakistan) Mahin Qureshi	(Indonesia) Deria Nur Haliza (Indonesia) Jessy Rompies	1–6, 0–6
Winner	23.	February 2018	2018 Fed Cup; Asia/Oceania Zone II	Bahrain	Hard	(Pakistan) Sara Mansoor	(Bahrain) Faten Husain (Bahrain) Nazli Nader Redha	6–0, 6–0
Winner	24.	February 2020	2020 Fed Cup; Asia/Oceania Zone II	Mongolia	Hard	(Pakistan) Mahin Qureshi	(Mongolia) Jargal Altansarnai (Mongolia) Erdenesuren Erdenebat	6–3, 6-3
Winner	25.	February 2020	2020 Fed Cup; Asia/Oceania Zone II	Singapore	Hard	(Pakistan) Mahin Qureshi	(Singapore) Tammy Tan (Singapore) Izabella Tan Hui Xin	6–1, 6–1
Runner-up	26.	February 2020	2020 Fed Cup; Asia/Oceania Zone II	New Zealand	Hard	(Pakistan) Mahin Qureshi	(New Zealand) Valentina Ivanov (New Zealand) Erin Routliffe	1–6, 0–6
