= 2012 Fed Cup Asia/Oceania Zone Group II – play-offs =

The play-offs of the 2012 Fed Cup Asia/Oceania Zone Group II were the final stages of the Group II Zonal Competition involving teams from Asia and Oceania. Using the positions determined in their pools, the ten teams faced off to determine their placing in the 2012 Fed Cup Asia/Oceania Zone Group II. The top team advanced to 2013 Asia/Oceania Zone Group I.

Placing	Pool A	Pool B
1	Hong Kong	India
2	Kyrgyzstan	Philippines
3	Singapore	Turkmenistan
4	Pakistan	Oman
5	Sri Lanka	Iran

== Promotional Round ==
The first placed teams of each pool played in a head-to-head round. The winner advanced to the Group I for 2013.

=== Hong Kong vs. India ===
Hong Kong
1
Shenzhen Luohu Tennis Centre, Shenzhen, China
February 4, 2012
Hard (outdoors)

India
2

			1	2	3
1	(Hong Kong) (India)	Chan Wing-yau; Rutuja Bhosale	6; 4	6; 1
2	(Hong Kong) (India)	Zhang Ling; Sania Mirza	7; 5	0; 6	1; 6
3	(Hong Kong) (India)	Chan Wing-yau / Zhang Ling; Isha Lakhani / Sania Mirza	7^{9} 6^{7}	1; 6	5; 7

== 3rd to 4th play-off ==
The second placed teams of each pool played in a head-to-head round to find the third and fourth placed teams.

=== Kyrgyzstan vs. Philippines ===
Kyrgyzstan
1
Shenzhen Luohu Tennis Centre, Shenzhen, China
February 4, 2012
Hard (outdoors)

Philippines
2

			1	2	3
1	(Kyrgyzstan) (Philippines)	Inna Volkovich; Maika Jae Tanpoco	4; 6	3; 6
2	(Kyrgyzstan) (Philippines)	Berment Duvanaeva; Tamitha Nguyen	6; 4	6; 3
3	(Kyrgyzstan) (Philippines)	Zhamilia Duisheeva / Emilia Tenizbaeva; Marian Jade Capadocia / Anna Clarice Patrimonio	1; 6	1; 6

== 5th to 6th play-off ==
The third placed teams of each pool played in a head-to-head round to find the fifth and sixth placed teams.

=== Singapore vs. Turkmenistan ===
Singapore
0
Shenzhen Luohu Tennis Centre, Shenzhen, China
February 4, 2012
Hard (outdoors)

Turkmenistan
3

			1	2	3
1	(Singapore) (Turkmenistan)	Hannah En Zin Chew; Jenneta Halliyeva	3; 6	3; 6
2	(Singapore) (Turkmenistan)	Geraldine Ang; Anastasiya Prenko	1; 6	1; 6
3	(Singapore) (Turkmenistan)	Olivia Koh Ee Yi / Rehmat Johal; Ummarahmat Hummetova / Anastasiya Prenko	3; 6	1; 6

== 7th to 8th play-off ==
The fourth placed teams of each pool played in a head-to-head round to find the seventh and eighth placed teams.

=== Pakistan vs. Oman ===
Pakistan
1
Shenzhen Luohu Tennis Centre, Shenzhen, China
February 4, 2012
Hard (outdoors)

Oman
2

			1	2	3
1	(Pakistan) (Oman)	Ushna Suhail; Sarah Al Balushi	6; 0	6; 0
2	(Pakistan) (Oman)	Saba Aziz; Fatma Al Nabhani	0; 6	2; 6
3	(Pakistan) (Oman)	Sara Mansoor / Ushna Suhail; Nilushi Fernando / Sarah Al Balushi	2; 6	6^{7} 7^{9}

== 9th to 10th play-off ==
The fifth placed teams of each pool played in a head-to-head round to find the ninth and tenth placed teams.

=== Sri Lanka vs. Iran ===
Sri Lanka
3
Shenzhen Luohu Tennis Centre, Shenzhen, China
February 4, 2012
Hard (outdoors)

Iran
0

			1	2	3
1	(Sri Lanka) (Iran)	Nilushi Fernando; Madona Najarian	6; 1	6; 3
2	(Sri Lanka) (Iran)	Thisuri Molligoda; Ghazaleh Torkaman	6; 1	6; 4
3	(Sri Lanka) (Iran)	Nilushi Fernando / Thisuri Molligoda; Madona Najarian / Ghazaleh Torkaman	2; 1			retired

== Final Placements ==
Placing	Teams
Promoted	India
Second	Hong Kong
Third	Philippines
Fourth	Kyrgyzstan
Fifth	Turkmenistan
Sixth	Singapore
Seventh	Oman
Eighth	Pakistan
Ninth	Sri Lanka
Tenth	Iran

- India advanced to the Fed Cup Asia/Oceania Zone Group I for 2013.

== See also ==
- Fed Cup structure
