= 2010 Fed Cup Asia/Oceania Zone Group II – play-offs =

The play-offs of the 2010 Fed Cup Asia/Oceania Zone Group II were the final stages of the Group II Zonal Competition involving teams from Asia and Oceania. Using the positions determined in their pools, the nine teams faced off to determine their placing in the 2010 Fed Cup Asia/Oceania Zone Group II. The top team advanced to Group I for the next year.

| Placing | Pool A | Pool B |
|---|---|---|
| 1 | India | Kyrgyzstan |
| 2 | Malaysia | Hong Kong |
| 3 | Singapore | Philippines |
| 4 | | Syria |

== Promotion play-offs ==
The first placed teams of each pool were placed against each other in a head-to-head round. The winner of the round advanced to Group I for 2011.

=== India vs. Kyrgyzstan ===
India
3
National Tennis Centre, Kuala Lumpur, Malaysia
6 February 2010
Synpave (outdoors)

Kyrgyzstan
0

| | | | 1 | 2 | 3 |
|---|---|---|---|---|---|---|
| 1 | (India) (Kyrgyzstan) | Rushmi Chakravarthi; Bermet Duvanaeva | 6; 4 | 1; 6 | 6; 3 |
| 2 | (India) (Kyrgyzstan) | Sania Mirza; Ksenia Palkina | 6; 0 | 6; 2 |
| 3 | (India) (Kyrgyzstan) | Sanaa Bhambri / Rushmi Chakravarthi; Nelli Buyuklianova / Bermet Duvanaeva | 6; 0 | 1; 0 | | retired |

== Third to Fourth play-offs ==
The second-placed teams from each pool were drawn in head-to-head rounds to find the third and fourth placed teams.

=== Malaysia vs. Hong Kong ===
Malaysia
1
National Tennis Centre, Kuala Lumpur, Malaysia
6 February 2010
Synpave (outdoors)

Hong Kong
2

| | | | 1 | 2 | 3 |
|---|---|---|---|---|---|
| 1 | (Malaysia) (Hong Kong) | Neesha Thirumalaichelvam; Lam Po Kuen | 0; 6 | 1; 6 |
| 2 | (Malaysia) (Hong Kong) | Jawairiah Noordin; Zhang Ling | 1; 6 | 1; 6 |
| 3 | (Malaysia) (Hong Kong) | Khoo Chin-bee / Jawairiah Noordin; Wu Ho-ching / Yang Zi-Jun | 6; 1 | 6; 3 |

== Fifth to Sixth play-offs ==
The third-placed teams from each pool were drawn in head-to-head rounds to find the fifth and sixth placed teams.

=== Singapore vs. Philippines ===
Singapore
2
National Tennis Centre, Kuala Lumpur, Malaysia
6 February 2010
Synpave (outdoors)

Philippines
1

| | | | 1 | 2 | 3 |
|---|---|---|---|---|---|
| 1 | (Singapore) (Philippines) | Khee Yen Wee; Michelle Pang | 2; 6 | 4; 6 |
| 2 | (Singapore) (Philippines) | Stefanie Tan; Anna Christine Patrimonio | 2; 6 | 6; 3 | 6; 2 |
| 3 | (Singapore) (Philippines) | Clare Fong / Stefanie Tan; Anna Christine Patrimonio / Marinel Rudas | 6; 4 | 7; 5 |

== Seventh ==
As there was only three teams from Pool A as opposed to the four from Pool B, the last-placed team from Pool B (Syria) had no equivalent to play against. Thus the Syrians were automatically allocated seventh place.

== Final Placements ==
| Placing | Teams |
| Promoted | India |
| Second | Kyrgyzstan |
| Third | Hong Kong |
| Fourth | Malaysia |
| Fifth | Singapore |
| Sixth | Philippines |
| Seventh | Syria |

- India advanced to the 2011 Fed Cup Asia/Oceania Zone Group I, where they placed last overall and thus was relegated back to Group II for 2012.

== See also ==
- Fed Cup structure
