= 2013 Fed Cup Asia/Oceania Zone =

Subsection of tennis competition

The Asia/Oceania Zone was one of three zones of regional competition in the 2013 Fed Cup.

== Group I ==
- Venue: National Tennis Centre, Astana, Kazakhstan (indoor hard)
- Dates: 6–9 February

The seven teams were divided into one pool of three and one pool of four teams. The two pool winners took part in play-offs to determine the nation advanced to the World Group II play-offs. The nations finishing last in their pools took part in relegation play-offs, with the losing nation was relegated to Group II for 2014.

=== Pools ===
	Pool A	KAZ	THA	IND
1	Kazakhstan (2–0)		2–1	3–0
2	Thailand (1–1)	1–2		3–0
3	India (0–2)	0–3	0–3	

	Pool B	UZB	CHN	TPE	KOR
1	Uzbekistan (3–0)		2–1	2–1	2–1
2	China (2–1)	1–2		3–0	2–1
3	Chinese Taipei (1–2)	1–2	0–3		3–0
4	South Korea (0–3)	1–2	1–2	0–3	

=== Play-offs ===
Placing	A Team	Score	B Team
Promotion	Kazakhstan	2–1	Uzbekistan
3rd–4th	Thailand	2–1	China
5th	N/A	–	Chinese Taipei
Relegation	India	0–3	South Korea

- Kazakhstan advanced to World Group II play-offs.
- India was relegated to Asia/Oceania Group II in 2014.

== Group II ==
- Venue: National Tennis Centre, Astana, Kazakhstan (indoor hard)
- Dates: 4–10 February

The eleven teams were divided into one pool of five and one pool of six teams. The winners of each pool played off against each other to determine which one team advanced to Asia/Oceania Zone Group I in 2014. All the other nations competed in the same manner for the positional play-offs.

=== Pools ===
	Pool A	HKG	NZL	VIE	TKM	SIN
1	Hong Kong (4–0)		2–1	3–0	3–0	3–0
2	New Zealand (3–1)	1–2		3–0	3–0	3–0
3	Vietnam (2–2)	0–3	0–3		3–0	3–0
4	Turkmenistan (1–3)	0–3	0–3	0–3		2–1
5	Singapore (0–4)	0–3	0–3	0–3	1–2	

	Pool B	INA	PHI	MAS	KGZ	PAK	IRI
1	Indonesia (5–0)		3–0	3–0	3–0	3–0	3–0
2	Philippines (4–1)	0–3		3–0	3–0	3–0	3–0
3	Malaysia (3–2)	0–3	0–3		2–1	3–0	3–0
4	Kyrgyzstan (2–3)	0–3	0–3	1–2		2–1	3–0
5	Pakistan (1–4)	0–3	0–3	0–3	1–2		3–0
6	Iran (0–5)	0–3	0–3	0–3	0–3	0–3	

=== Play-offs ===
Placing	A Team	Score	B Team
Promotion	Hong Kong	0–2	Indonesia
3rd–4th	New Zealand	2–0	Philippines
5th–6th	Vietnam	3–0	Malaysia
7th–8th	Turkmenistan	3–0	Kyrgyzstan
9th–10th	Singapore	3–0	Pakistan
11th	N/A	–	Iran

- Indonesia was promoted to Asia/Oceania Group I in 2014.

== See also ==
- Fed Cup structure
