= Iran Billie Jean King Cup team =

Women's national tennis team

Iran
- Captain: Farnaz Fasihi
- ITF ranking: 81
- Colors: red & white
- First year: 1972
- Years played: 12 (2023)
- Ties played (W–L): 30 (4–26)
- Years in World Group: 1 (0–1)
- Best finish: World Group 1R (1972)
- Most total wins: Sadigheh Sadeghvaziri (4-12)
- Most singles wins: Sadigheh Sadeghvaziri (3-7)
- Most doubles wins: Ghazal Pakbaten (2-6)
- Best doubles team: Sara Amini / Ghazal Pakbaten (1–0); Ghazal Pakbaten / Ghazaleh Torkaman (1–2)
- Most ties played: Ghazaleh Torkaman (18)
- Most years played: Ghazaleh Torkaman (6)

The Iran Fed Cup team represents Iran in Fed Cup tennis competition and are governed by the Tennis Federation of Iran. They currently compete in the Asia/Oceania Zone of Group II.

== History ==
Iran competed in its first Fed Cup in 1972.

== Current team ==
- Farnaz Fasihi (Captain)
- Sadaf Sadeghvaziri
- Ghazal Pakbaten
- Yasmin Mansouri
- Sarah Amiri

== Tournaments ==
Year	Zone	Notes
1972	Consolation Round	1st Round, Consolation
2009	Asia/Oceania Zone Group II	Pool Stage
2012	Asia/Oceania Zone Group II	Pool Stage, Playoffs
2013	Asia/Oceania Zone Group II	Pool Stage
2014	Asia/Oceania Zone Group II	Pool Stage, Playoffs
2015	Asia/Oceania Zone Group II	Pool Stage, Playoffs
2016	Asia/Oceania Zone Group II	Pool Stage, Playoffs
2017	Asia/Oceania Zone Group II	Pool Stage, Playoffs

=== Results ===
#	Year	M	W	L	GF	GA
X	1963-1971	DNE (9)				
1	1972	1	0	1	0	3
X	1973-2008	DNE (36)				
2	2009	3	0	3	0	9
X	2010-2011	DNE (2)				
3	2012	5	0	5	1	14
4	2013	5	0	5	0	15
5	2014	4	1	3	2	10
6	2015	3	1	2	3	5
7	2016	5	1	4	4	10
8	2017	3	1	2	2	7
9	2018	3	0	3	1	8
10	2019	3	1	2	3	6
X	2020	Cancelled				
X	2021	DNE (1)				
11	2022	5	1	4	4	10
12	2023	TBC				
Total	12/60	40	6	34	20	97

== Statistics ==
Since 1972(Last updated 30 August 2017)

Record

- Champion: none
- Runner-up: none
- Lost in Semifinals: none
- Lost in Quarterfinals: none
- Lost in First Round: n times

Home and away record (all NN match-ups)

- Performance at home (NN match-ups): NN–NN (NN.N%)
- Performance away (NN match-ups): NN–NN (NN.N%)
- Total: NN–NN (NN.N%)

Head-to-head record (1972–)

Asia and Oceania

- Bahrain 1-0
- Hong Kong 0-3
- India 0-2
- Japan 0-1
- Kazakhstan 0-1
- Kyrgyzstan 1-1
- Malaysia 0-1
- New Zealand 0-1
- Oman 1-0
- Pakistan 1-1
- Philippines 0-3
- Pacific Oceania 0-2
- Singapore 0-1
- Sri Lanka 0-2
- Turkmenistan 0-2
- Vietnam 0-1

Americas

- Ecuador 0-1

== Results ==
Year	Competition	Date	Surface	Location	Opponent	Score	Result
1972	Federation Cup First Round	20 Mar	Hard	Johannesburg, South Africa	Ecuador	0 : 3	Lost
2009	Asia/Oceania Zone Group II Pool	4 Feb	Hard	Perth, Australia	Kazakhstan	0 : 3	Lost
2009	Asia/Oceania Zone Group II Pool	5 Feb	Hard	Perth, Australia	Hong Kong	0 : 3	Lost
2009	Asia/Oceania Zone Group II Pool	6 Feb	Hard	Perth, Australia	Singapore	0 : 3	Lost
2012	Asia/Oceania Zone Group II Pool B	30 Jan	Hard	Shenzhen, China	India	0 : 3	Lost
2012	Asia/Oceania Zone Group II Pool B	31 Jan	Hard	Shenzhen, China	Philippines	0 : 3	Lost
2012	Asia/Oceania Zone Group II Pool B	1 Feb	Hard	Shenzhen, China	Turkmenistan	0 : 3	Lost
2012	Asia/Oceania Zone Group II Pool B	2 Feb	Hard	Shenzhen, China	Oman	1 : 2	Lost
2012	Asia/Oceania Zone Group II Playoffs	4 Feb	Hard	Shenzhen, China	Sri Lanka	0 : 3	Lost
2013	Asia/Oceania Zone Group II Pool B	4 Feb	Hard (i)	Astana, Kazakhstan	Malaysia	0 : 3	Lost
2013	Asia/Oceania Zone Group II Pool B	5 Feb	Hard (i)	Astana, Kazakhstan	Philippines	0 : 3	Lost
2013	Asia/Oceania Zone Group II Pool B	6 Feb	Hard (i)	Astana, Kazakhstan	Pakistan	0 : 3	Lost
2013	Asia/Oceania Zone Group II Pool B	7 Feb	Hard (i)	Astana, Kazakhstan	Kyrgyzstan	0 : 3	Lost
2013	Asia/Oceania Zone Group II Pool B	8 Feb	Hard (i)	Astana, Kazakhstan	Indonesia	0 : 3	Lost

== See also ==
- Billie Jean King Cup
- Iran Davis Cup team
