= 2010 Fed Cup Asia/Oceania Zone Group II – Pool B =

Group B of the 2010 Fed Cup Asia/Oceania Zone Group II was one of two pools in the Asia/Oceania Zone Group II of the 2010 Fed Cup. Three teams competed in a round robin competition, with the teams proceeding to their respective sections of the play-offs: the top team played for advancement to the 2011 Group I.

		(Hong Kong) HKG	(Philippines) PHI	(Syria) SYR	(Kyrgyzstan) KGZ	RR; W–L	Set; W–L	Game; W–L	Standings
44	Hong Kong		3–0	3–0	1–2	2–1	14–6	114–52	2
74	Philippines	0–3		3–0	0–3	1–2	7–14	63–94	3
93	Syria	0–3	0–3		0–3	0–3	2–18	27–113	4
	Kyrgyzstan	2–1	3–0	3–0		3–0	17–2	109–55	1

== Hong Kong vs. Syria ==
Hong Kong
3
National Tennis Centre, Kuala Lumpur, Malaysia
3 February 2010
Synpave (outdoors)

Syria
0

			1	2	3
1	(Hong Kong) (Syria)	Yang Zi-Jun; Kim Sadi	6; 0	6; 1
2	(Hong Kong) (Syria)	Zhang Ling; Diala Jamaleddine	6; 0	6; 1
3	(Hong Kong) (Syria)	Lam Po Kuen / Ho Ching Wu; Diana Makki / Kett Sadi	6; 0	6; 2

== Philippines vs. Kyrgyzstan ==
Philippines
0
National Tennis Centre, Kuala Lumpur, Malaysia
3 February 2010
Synpave (outdoors)

Kyrgyzstan
3

			1	2	3
1	(Philippines) (Kyrgyzstan)	Michelle Pang; Bermet Duvanaeva	2; 6	1; 6
2	(Philippines) (Kyrgyzstan)	Anna Christine Patrimonio; Ksenia Palkina	2; 6	3; 6
3	(Philippines) (Kyrgyzstan)	Anna Christine Patrimonio / Marinel Rudas; Bermet Duvanaeva / Ksenia Palkina	2; 6	1; 6

== Hong Kong vs. Philippines ==
Hong Kong
3
National Tennis Centre, Kuala Lumpur, Malaysia
4 February 2010
Synpave (outdoors)

Philippines
0

			1	2	3
1	(Hong Kong) (Philippines)	Yang Zi-Jun; Michelle Pang	4; 6	6; 0	6; 1
2	(Hong Kong) (Philippines)	Zhang Ling; Anna Christine Patrimonio	6; 2	6; 0
3	(Hong Kong) (Philippines)	Yang Zi-Jun / Zhang Ling; Michelle Pang / Marinel Rudas	6; 0	6; 2

== Syria vs. Kyrgyzstan ==
Syria
0
National Tennis Centre, Kuala Lumpur, Malaysia
4 February 2010
Synpave (outdoors)

Kyrgyzstan
3

			1	2	3
1	(Syria) (Kyrgyzstan)	Kim Sadi; Bermet Duvanaeva	1; 6	1; 6
2	(Syria) (Kyrgyzstan)	Kett Sadi; Ksenia Palkina	0; 6	0; 6
3	(Syria) (Kyrgyzstan)	Diala Jamaleddine / Kim Sadi; Nelli Buyuklianova / Ksenia Palkina	0; 6	4; 6

== Hong Kong vs. Kyrgyzstan ==
Hong Kong
1
National Tennis Centre, Kuala Lumpur, Malaysia
5 February 2010
Synpave (outdoors)

Kyrgyzstan
2

			1	2	3
1	(Hong Kong) (Kyrgyzstan)	Yang Zi-Jun; Bermet Duvanaeva	6; 1	5; 7	6; 1
2	(Hong Kong) (Kyrgyzstan)	Zhang Ling; Ksenia Palkina	5; 7	6^{3} 7^{7}
3	(Hong Kong) (Kyrgyzstan)	Yang Zi-Jun / Zhang Ling; Bermet Duvanaeva / Ksenia Palkina	5; 7	5; 7

== Philippines vs. Syria ==
Philippines
3
National Tennis Centre, Kuala Lumpur, Malaysia
5 February 2010
Synpave (outdoors)

Syria
0

			1	2	3
1	(Philippines) (Syria)	Michelle Pang; Kim Sadi	4; 6	6; 1	6; 2
2	(Philippines) (Syria)	Anna Christine Patrimonio; Kett Sadi	6; 0	6; 0
3	(Philippines) (Syria)	Anna Christine Patrimonio / Marinel Rudas; Diala Jamaleddine / Diana Makki	6; 3	1; 6	6; 0

== See also ==
- Fed Cup structure
