= Pakistan women's national tennis team =

The Pakistan women's national tennis team represents Pakistan in international tennis competitions. It is administered by the Pakistan Tennis Federation (PTF). Members of the team compete in singles, doubles, mixed doubles and team events at competitions including continental and regional games (Asian and South Asian Games). It also has a team which competes at the Billie Jean King Cup.

== Members ==
The following is a list of women who have competed internationally for Pakistan (including in the Fed Cup/Billie Jean King Cup):

Current Members
Name	Competitions	Events
Maheen Aftab	South Asian Games: 2019	Singles (2019), Doubles (2019)
Mahin Qureshi	Fed Cup	
Meheq Khokhar	Fed Cup	
Sara Mansoor	Fed Cup; South Asian Games: 2016, 2019	Singles (2016), Mixed doubles (2019)
Sarah Mahboob Khan	Fed Cup; South Asian Games: 2019	Doubles (2019)
Ushna Suhail	Fed Cup; South Asian Games: 2016, 2019	Singles (2016, 2019), Mixed doubles (2016, 2019)

Former Members
Name	Competitions	Events
Saba Aziz	Fed Cup	
Haleema Rahim	Fed Cup	
Iman Qureshi	Fed Cup	
Maheen Dada	Fed Cup	
Mariam Rahim	Fed Cup	
Mehvish Chistie	Fed Cup	
Nida Waseem	Fed Cup	
Noor Malik	Fed Cup	
Nosheen Ehtesham	Fed Cup	
Sara Haider	Fed Cup	
Rida Khalid	Fed Cup	

== Results ==
=== Billie Jean King Cup (formerly Fed Cup) ===
Year	Zone	Group	Final Standing
1997	Asia/Oceania Zone	II	7th
1998	Asia/Oceania Zone	II	
1999	Asia/Oceania Zone	II	3rd
2000	Asia/Oceania Zone	II	
2001	Did not participate		
2002	Did not participate		
2003	Did not participate		
2004	Did not participate		
2005	Did not participate		
2006	Did not participate		
2007	Did not participate		
2008	Did not participate		
2009	Did not participate		
2010	Did not participate		
2011	Asia/Oceania Zone	II	6th
2012	Asia/Oceania Zone	II	8th
2013	Asia/Oceania Zone	II	10th
2014	Asia/Oceania Zone	II	
2015	Asia/Oceania Zone	II	
2016	Asia/Oceania Zone	II	9th
2017	Asia/Oceania Zone	II	
2018	Asia/Oceania Zone	II	
2019	Asia/Oceania Zone	II	6th
2020	Asia/Oceania Zone	II	4th

=== South Asian Games ===
Year	Result (singles)	Position	Result (doubles)	Position	Result (mixed)	Position	Result (team)	Position
(India) Guwahati 2016	Semi-Finalist Semi-Finalist	3rd3rd			Semi-Finalist	3rd		
(Nepal) Kathmandu 2019	Quarter-Finalists (2)		Quarter-Finalists		Semi-Finalist	3rd	Semi-Finalist	3rd

== Medals ==
South Asian Games
Games	Gold	Silver	Bronze	Total
(India) Guwahati (2016)	0	0	3	3
(Nepal) Kathmandu (2019)	0	0	2	2
Total	0	0	5	5
