= 2011 Fed Cup =

International women's tennis competition

Details
- Duration: 5 February– 6 November
- Edition: 49th

Achievements (singles)

The 2011 Fed Cup (also known as the 2011 Fed Cup by BNP Paribas for sponsorship purposes) was the 49th edition of the tournament between national teams in women's tennis.

The final took place at the Olympic Stadium in Moscow, Russia, on 5–6 November. Czech Republic defeated the home team, Russia, to win their sixth title and first as an independent nation.

== World Group ==
Participating teams
Australia	Belgium	Czech Republic	France
Italy	Russia	Slovakia	United States

=== Draw ===
Quarterfinals; 5–6 February
Hobart, Australia (Outdoor hard)
1	Italy	4
Australia	1
Moscow, Russia (Indoor hard)
France	2
3	Russia	3
Bratislava, Slovakia (Indoor hard)
4	Czech Republic	3
Slovakia	2
Antwerp, Belgium (Indoor hard)
Belgium	4
2	United States	1

Semifinals; 16–17 April
Moscow, Russia (Indoor hard)
1	Italy	0
3	Russia	5
Charleroi, Belgium (Indoor hard)
4	Czech Republic	3
Belgium	2

Final; 5–6 November
Moscow, Russia (Indoor hard)
3	Russia	2
4	Czech Republic	3

== World Group play-offs ==
The four losing teams in the World Group first round ties (Australia, France, Slovakia and United States), and four winners of the World Group II ties (Spain, Germany, Serbia and Ukraine) entered the draw for the World Group play-offs. Four seeded teams, based on the latest Fed Cup ranking, were drawn against four unseeded teams.

Date: 16–17 April

Venue	Surface	Home team	Score	Visiting team
Porsche Arena, Stuttgart, Germany	Indoor clay	Germany	5–0	United States (1)
Club de Tenis Lleida, Lleida, Spain	Outdoor clay	Spain (2)	4–1	France
Sibamac Arena, Bratislava, Slovakia	Indoor clay	Slovakia (3)	2–3	Serbia
Glen Iris Valley Recreational Club, Melbourne, Australia	Outdoor clay	Australia (4)	2–3	Ukraine

== World Group II ==
The World Group II was the second highest level of Fed Cup competition in 2011. The winners advanced to the World Group play-offs, and the loser playing in the World Group II play-offs.

Date: 5–6 February

Venue	Surface	Home team	Score	Visiting team
Tere Tennis Club, Tallinn, Estonia	Indoor hard	Estonia	1–4	Spain (1)
Ljudski vrt Sports Hall, Maribor, Slovenia	Indoor clay	Slovenia	1–4	Germany (4)
Spens Sports Center, Novi Sad, Serbia	Indoor hard	Serbia (3)	3–2	Canada
Idrottens Hus, Helsingborg, Sweden	Indoor hard	Sweden	2–3	Ukraine (2)

== World Group II play-offs ==
The four losing teams from World Group II (Estonia, Slovenia, Canada and Sweden) played off against qualifiers from Zonal Group I. Two teams qualified from Europe/Africa Zone (Belarus and Switzerland), one team from the Asia/Oceania Zone (Japan), and one team from the Americas Zone (Argentina).

Date: 16–17 April

Venue	Surface	Home team	Score	Visiting team
Minsk Sports Palace, Minsk, Belarus	Indoor hard	Belarus	5–0	Estonia (1)
Bourbon Beans Dome, Kobe, Japan	Indoor hard	Japan	4–0	Argentina (2)
Teniski Klub Koper, Koper, Slovenia	Outdoor clay	Slovenia	3–2	Canada (3)
TC Lido Lugano, Lugano, Switzerland	Outdoor clay	Switzerland (4)	4–1	Sweden

== Americas Zone ==
- Nations in **bold** advanced to the higher level of competition.
- Nations in italics were relegated down to a lower level of competition.

=== Group I ===
Venue: Tenis Club Argentino, Buenos Aires, Argentina (outdoor clay)

Dates: February 2–5

Participating teams

- **Argentina**
- Brazil
- Bolivia
- Chile
- Colombia
- Mexico
- Paraguay
- Peru

=== Group II ===
Venue: Centro Nacional de Tenis, Santo Domingo, Dominican Republic (outdoor hard)

Dates: May 16–22

Participating teams

- **Bahamas**
- Costa Rica
- Dominican Republic
- Ecuador
- Guatemala
- Panama
- Puerto Rico
- Trinidad and Tobago
- Uruguay
- **Venezuela**

== Asia/Oceania Zone ==
- Nations in **bold** advanced to the higher level of competition.
- Nations in italics were relegated down to a lower level of competition.

=== Group I ===
Venue: National Tennis Centre, Nonthaburi, Thailand (outdoor hard)

Dates: February 2–5

Participating teams

- China
- Chinese Taipei
- India
- **Japan**
- Kazakhstan
- South Korea
- Thailand
- Uzbekistan

=== Group II ===
Venue: National Tennis Centre, Nonthaburi, Thailand (outdoor hard)

Dates: February 2–5

Participating teams

- Hong Kong
- **Indonesia**
- Kyrgyzstan
- Oman
- Pakistan
- Philippines
- Singapore
- Turkmenistan

== Europe/Africa Zone ==
- Nations in **bold** advanced to the higher level of competition.
- Nations in italics were relegated down to a lower level of competition.

=== Group I ===
Venue: Municipal Tennis Club, Eilat, Israel (outdoor hard)

Dates: February 2–5

Participating teams

- Austria
- **Belarus**
- Bulgaria
- Croatia
- Denmark
- Great Britain
- Greece
- Hungary
- Israel
- Latvia
- Luxembourg
- Netherlands
- Poland
- Romania
- **Switzerland**

=== Group II ===
Venue: Smash Tennis Academy, Cairo, Egypt (outdoor clay)

Dates: May 4–7

Participating teams

- Armenia
- **Bosnia and Herzegovina**
- Finland
- Georgia
- Morocco
- **Portugal**
- Turkey

=== Group III ===
Venue: Smash Tennis Academy, Cairo, Egypt (outdoor clay)

Dates: May 2–7

Participating teams

- Algeria
- Egypt
- Ireland
- Lithuania
- Moldova
- **Montenegro**
- Norway
- **South Africa**
- Tunisia

== Rankings ==
The rankings were measured after the three points during the year that play took place, and were collated by combining points earned from the previous four years.

7 February
Rank	Nation	Points	Move
1	Italy	37,092.5	Steady
2	Russia	21,055.0	▲1
3	United States	17,002.5	▼1
4	Czech Republic	10,827.5	Steady
5	Belgium	8,845.0	▲3
6	Spain	7,345.0	▼1
7	Slovakia	5,037.5	▼1
8	Australia	4,987.5	▼1
9	France	4,800.0	Steady
10	Serbia	4,785.0	▲1

18 April
Rank	Nation	Points	Move
1	Italy	31,927.5	Steady
2	Russia	24,165.0	Steady
3	Czech Republic	16,470.0	▲1
4	United States	13,912.5	▼1
5	Belgium	7,775.0	Steady
6	Spain	7,157.5	Steady
7	Serbia	6,115.0	▲3
8	Ukraine	6,070.0	▲3
9	Germany	5,655.0	▲3
10	Australia	4,175.0	▼2

7 November
Rank	Nation	Points	Move
1	Italy	31,927.5	Steady
2	Czech Republic	24,650.0	▲1
3	Russia	20,120.0	▼1
4	United States	13,912.5	Steady
5	Belgium	7,775.0	Steady
6	Spain	7,157.5	Steady
7	Serbia	6,115.0	Steady
8	Ukraine	6,070.0	Steady
9	Germany	5,655.0	Steady
10	Australia	4,175.0	Steady

== See also ==
- 2012 Fed Cup
