= 2012 Fed Cup =

International women's tennis competition

Details
- Duration: 4 February– 4 November
- Edition: 50th

Achievements (singles)

The 2012 Fed Cup (also known as the 2012 Fed Cup by BNP Paribas for sponsorship purposes) was the 50th edition of the most important tournament between national teams in women's tennis. The draw took place on 17 July 2011 in Kobe, Japan.

The final took place at the O2 Arena in Prague, Czech Republic on 3–4 November. The home and defending champions Czech Republic defeated the first-finalists Serbia, to win their seventh title and equal the record for second-most titles won by a country since the competition's beginning.

Czech Republic was the only country except United States and Australia to hold both Davis Cup and Fed Cup at the same time – the Czechs did the same in 2012. Petra Kvitová and Tomáš Berdych also scored Hopman Cup victory at the same year, making their nation the first ever to clinch all of the Davis, Fed and Hopman Cup titles in the same calendar year.

== World Group ==
Participating teams
Belgium	Czech Republic	Germany	Italy
Russia	Serbia	Spain	Ukraine

=== Draw ===
Quarterfinals; 4–5 February
Moscow, Russia (Indoor hard)
1	Russia	3
Spain	2
Charleroi, Belgium (Indoor hard)
Serbia	3
4	Belgium	2
Biella, Italy (Indoor clay)
3	Italy	3
Ukraine	2
Stuttgart, Germany (Indoor hard)
Germany	1
2	Czech Republic	4

Semifinals; 21–22 April
Moscow, Russia (Indoor clay)
1	Russia	2
Serbia	3
Ostrava, Czech Republic (Indoor hard)
3	Italy	1
2	Czech Republic	4

Final; 3–4 November
Prague, Czech Republic (Indoor hard)
Serbia	1
2	Czech Republic	3

== World Group play-offs ==
The four losing teams in the World Group first round ties, and four winners of the World Group II ties entered the draw for the World Group play-offs. Four seeded teams, based on the latest Fed Cup ranking, were drawn against four unseeded teams. The United States, Japan, Slovakia and Australia played in the 2013 Fed Cup World Group while Ukraine, Belgium, Spain and Germany played in World Group II.

Date: 21–22 April

Venue	Surface	Home team	Score	Visiting team
Superior Golf & Spa Resort, Kharkiv, Ukraine	Outdoor clay	Ukraine	0–5	United States (1)
Ariake Coliseum, Tokyo, Japan	Indoor hard	Japan	4–1	Belgium (2)
Club de Tenis Puente Romano, Marbella, Spain	Outdoor clay	Spain (3)	2–3	Slovakia
Porsche Arena, Stuttgart, Germany	Indoor clay	Germany	2–3	Australia (4)

== World Group II ==
The World Group II was the second highest level of Fed Cup competition in 2012. The winners advanced to the World Group play-offs, while the losers continued in the World Group II play-offs.

Date: 4–5 February

Venue	Surface	Home team	Score	Visiting team
DCU Center, Worcester, Massachusetts, United States	Indoor hard	United States (1)	5–0	Belarus
Ariake Coliseum, Tokyo, Japan	Indoor hard	Japan (4)	5–0	Slovenia
Sibamac Center, Bratislava, Slovakia	Indoor hard	Slovakia (3)	3–2	France
Forum Fribourg, Granges-Paccot, Switzerland	Indoor clay	Switzerland	1–4	Australia (2)

== World Group II play-offs ==
The four losing teams from World Group II played off against qualifiers from Zonal Group I. Two teams qualified from Europe/Africa Zone, one team from the Asia/Oceania Zone, and one team from the Americas Zone.

Date: 21–22 April

Venue	Surface	Home team	Score	Visiting team
Palais des Sports, Besançon, France	Indoor hard	France (1)	5–0	Slovenia
Complexe Sportive des Iles Avenue des trois lacs, Yverdon-les-Bains, Switzerland	Indoor hard	Switzerland (2)	4–1	Belarus
Boråshallen, Borås, Sweden	Indoor hard	Sweden (3)	4–1	Great Britain
Parque Roca, Buenos Aires, Argentina	Outdoor clay	Argentina (4)	4–1	China

== Americas Zone ==
- Nations in **bold** advanced to the higher level of competition.
- Nations in italics were relegated down to a lower level of competition.

=== Group I ===
Venue: Graciosa Country Club, Curitiba, Brazil (outdoor clay)

Dates: January 30 – February 5

Participating teams

- **Argentina**
- Bahamas
- Brazil
- Bolivia
- Canada
- Colombia
- Paraguay
- Peru
- Venezuela

=== Group II ===
Venue: Guadalajara, Mexico

Dates: Week commencing 16 April

Participating teams

- **Chile**
- Costa Rica
- Dominican Republic
- Ecuador
- Guatemala
- **Mexico**
- Puerto Rico
- Trinidad and Tobago
- Uruguay

== Asia/Oceania Zone ==
- Nations in **bold** advanced to the higher level of competition.
- Nations in italics were relegated down to a lower level of competition.

=== Group I ===
Venue: Shenzhen Luohu Tennis Centre, Shenzhen, China (outdoor hard)

Dates: January 30 – February 5

Participating teams

- **China**
- Chinese Taipei
- Indonesia
- Kazakhstan
- South Korea
- Thailand
- Uzbekistan

=== Group II ===
Venue: Shenzhen Luohu Tennis Centre, Shenzhen, China (outdoor hard)

Dates: January 30 – February 5

Participating teams

- Hong Kong
- **India**
- Iran
- Kyrgyzstan
- Oman
- Pakistan
- Philippines
- Singapore
- Sri Lanka
- Turkmenistan

== Europe/Africa Zone ==
- Nations in **bold** advanced to the higher level of competition.
- Nations in italics were relegated down to a lower level of competition.

=== Group I ===
Venue: Municipal Tennis Club, Eilat, Israel (outdoor hard)

Dates: January 30 – February 5

Participating teams

- Austria
- Bosnia and Herzegovina
- Bulgaria
- Croatia
- Estonia
- **Great Britain**
- Greece
- Hungary
- Israel
- Luxembourg
- Netherlands
- Poland
- Portugal
- Romania
- **Sweden**

=== Group II ===
Venue: Gizera Sporting Club, Cairo, Egypt

Dates: Week commencing 16 April

Participating teams

- Denmark
- Finland
- **Georgia**
- Latvia
- Montenegro
- Norway
- South Africa
- **Turkey**

=== Group III ===
Venue: Gizera Sporting Club, Cairo, Egypt

Dates: Week commencing 16 April

Participating teams

- Armenia
- Cyprus
- Egypt
- Ireland
- Kenya
- **Lithuania**
- Malta
- Moldova
- Morocco
- Namibia
- **Tunisia**

== Rankings ==
The rankings were measured after the three points during the year that play took place, and were collated by combining points earned from the previous four years.

6 February
Rank	Nation	Points	Move
1	Italy	28,867.5	Steady
2	Czech Republic	25,280.0	Steady
3	Russia	20,120.0	Steady
4	United States	12,412.5	Steady
5	Serbia	9,295.0	▲2
6	Belgium	6,330.0	▼1
7	Spain	5,712.5	▼1
8	Australia	4,915.0	▲2
9	Germany	4,855.0	Steady
10	Ukraine	4,837.5	▼2

23 April
Rank	Nation	Points	Move
1	Czech Republic	29,397.5	▲1
2	Italy	25,247.5	▼1
3	Russia	17,025.0	Steady
4	Serbia	14,117.5	▲1
5	United States	11,572.5	▼1
6	Japan	6,382.5	▲6
7	Australia	6,252.5	▲1
8	Slovakia	6,062.5	▲3
9	Belgium	5,260.0	▼3
10	Germany	3,772.5	▼1

5 November
Rank	Nation	Points	Move
1	Czech Republic	35,532.5	Steady
2	Italy	21,157.5	Steady
3	Russia	15,025.0	Steady
4	Serbia	14,117.5	Steady
5	United States	11,472.5	Steady
6	Australia	6,252.5	▲1
7	Japan	6,112.5	▼1
8	Slovakia	6,062.5	Steady
9	Belgium	5,260.0	Steady
10	Germany	3,772.5	Steady
