= 2013 Fed Cup =

International women's tennis competition

Details
- Duration: 9 February– 3 November
- Edition: 51st

Achievements (singles)

The 2013 Fed Cup (also known as the 2013 Fed Cup by BNP Paribas for sponsorship purposes) was the 51st edition of the most important tournament between national teams in women's tennis.

The draw took place on 6 June 2012 in Paris, France.

The final took place at the Tennis Club Cagliari in Cagliari, Italy on 1–2 November. The home and three time champions Italy defeated the fourth-seeded Russia, to win their fourth title.

Vietnam made its first appearance in the tournament.

== World Group ==
=== Participating teams ===
- Australia
- Czech Republic
- Italy
- Japan
- Russia
- Serbia
- Slovakia
- United States

=== Draw ===
Quarterfinals; 9–10 February
Ostrava, Czech Republic (Indoor hard)
1	Czech Republic	4
Australia	0
Rimini, Italy (Indoor clay)
United States	2
3	Italy	3
Moscow, Russia (Indoor hard)
4	Russia	3
Japan	2
Niš, Serbia (Indoor hard)
Slovakia	3
2	Serbia	2

Semifinals; 20–21 April
Palermo, Italy (Outdoor clay)
1	Czech Republic	1
3	Italy	3
Moscow, Russia (Indoor clay)
4	Russia	3
Slovakia	2

Final; 2–3 November
Cagliari, Italy (Outdoor clay)
3	Italy	4
4	Russia	0

== World Group II ==
The World Group II was the second highest level of Fed Cup competition in 2013. Winners advanced to the World Group play-offs, and the losers played in the World Group II play-offs.

Date: 9–10 February

Venue	Surface	Home team	Score	Visiting team
Sporthalle Wankdorf, Bern, Switzerland	Indoor hard	Switzerland	4–1	Belgium (1)
Estadio Mary Terán de Weiss, Buenos Aires, Argentina	Outdoor clay	Argentina	2–3	Sweden (4)
Club Atlético Montemar, Alicante, Spain	Outdoor clay	Spain	3–1	Ukraine (3)
Palais des Sports de Beaublanc, Limoges, France	Indoor clay	France	1–3	Germany (2)

== World Group play-offs ==
The four losing teams in the World Group first round ties, and four winners of the World Group II ties entered the draw for the World Group play-offs. Four seeded teams, based on the latest Fed Cup ranking, were drawn against four unseeded teams.

Date: 20–21 April

Venue	Surface	Home team	Score	Visiting team
Porsche Arena, Stuttgart, Germany	Indoor clay	Germany	3–2	Serbia (1)
Tennis Club Chiasso, Chiasso, Switzerland	Outdoor clay	Switzerland	1–3	Australia (3)
Real Club de Polo, Barcelona, Spain	Outdoor clay	Spain	4–0	Japan (4)
Delray Beach Tennis Center, Delray Beach, United States	Outdoor hard	United States (2)	3–2	Sweden

== World Group II play-offs ==
The four losing teams from World Group II played off against qualifiers from Zonal Group I. Two teams qualified from Europe/Africa Zone, one team from the Asia/Oceania Zone, and one team from the Americas Zone.

Date: 20–21 April

Venue	Surface	Home team	Score	Visiting team
Tennisclub Koksijde, Koksijde, Belgium	Indoor hard	Belgium (1)	1–4	Poland
Palais des Sports de Besançon, Besançon, France	Indoor hard	France (3)	4–1	Kazakhstan
Estadio Mary Terán de Weiss, Buenos Aires, Argentina	Outdoor clay	Argentina	3–1	Great Britain (4)
Sport Club Meridian, Kiev, Ukraine	Indoor clay	Ukraine (2)	2–3	Canada

== Americas Zone ==
- Nations in **bold** advanced to the higher level of competition.
- Nations in italics were relegated down to a lower level of competition.

=== Group I ===
Venue: Country Club de Ejecutivos, Medellín, Colombia (outdoor clay)

Dates: 6–9 February

==== Participating teams ====
- Brazil
- **Canada**
- Chile
- Colombia
- Mexico
- Paraguay
- Peru
- Venezuela

=== Group II ===
Venue: Maya Country Club, Santa Tecla, El Salvador

Dates: 17–20 July

==== Participating teams ====
- **Bahamas**
- Bolivia
- Costa Rica
- Dominican Republic
- **Ecuador**
- El Salvador
- Guatemala
- Honduras
- Puerto Rico
- Trinidad and Tobago
- Uruguay

== Asia/Oceania Zone ==
- Nations in **bold** advanced to the higher level of competition.
- Nations in italics were relegated down to a lower level of competition.

=== Group I ===
Venue: National Tennis Centre, Astana, Kazakhstan (indoor hard)

Dates: 6–9 February

==== Participating teams ====
- China
- Chinese Taipei
- India
- **Kazakhstan**
- South Korea
- Thailand
- Uzbekistan

=== Group II ===
Venue: National Tennis Centre, Astana, Kazakhstan (indoor hard)

Dates: 4–9 February

==== Participating teams ====
- Hong Kong
- **Indonesia**
- Iran
- Kyrgyzstan
- Malaysia
- New Zealand
- Pakistan
- Philippines
- Singapore
- Turkmenistan
- Vietnam

== Europe/Africa Zone ==
- Nations in **bold** advanced to the higher level of competition.
- Nations in italics were relegated down to a lower level of competition.

=== Group I ===
Venue: Municipal Tennis Club, Eilat, Israel (outdoor hard)

Dates: 6–10 February

==== Participating teams ====
- Austria
- Belarus
- Bosnia and Herzegovina
- Bulgaria
- Croatia
- Georgia
- **Great Britain**
- Hungary
- Israel
- Luxembourg
- Netherlands
- **Poland**
- Portugal
- Romania
- Slovenia
- Turkey

=== Pools ===
	**Pool A**	CRO	BLR	AUT	GEO
1	Croatia (3–0)		3–0	2–1	3–0
2	Belarus (2–1)	0–3		2–1	3–0
3	Austria (1–2)	1–2	1–2		3–0
4	Georgia (0–3)	0–3	0–3	0–3	

	**Pool B**	GBR	HUN	POR	BIH
1	Great Britain (3–0)		2–1	2–1	3–0
2	Hungary (2–1)	1–2		3–0	3–0
3	Portugal (1–2)	1–2	0–3		2–1
4	Bosnia and Herzegovina (0–3)	0–3	0–3	1–2	

	**Pool C**	POL	ISR	ROU	TUR
1	Poland (3–0)		2–1	2–1	3–0
2	Israel (1–2)	1–2		1–2	2–1
3	Romania (1–2)	1–2	2–1		1–2
4	Turkey (1–2)	0–3	1–2	2–1	

	**Pool D**	BUL	NED	SLO	LUX
1	Bulgaria (3–0)		3–0	3–0	3–0
2	Netherlands (2–1)	3–0		0–3	3–0
3	Slovenia (1–2)	0–3	0–3		2–1
4	Luxembourg (0–3)	1–2	0–3	0–3	

=== Play-offs ===
Placing	A Team	Score	C Team
Promotional	Croatia	1–2	**Poland**
5th–8th	Belarus	0–2	**Israel**
9th–12th	**Austria**	2–1	Romania
Relegation	Georgia	1–2	**Turkey**

Placing	B Team	Score	D Team
Promotional	**Great Britain**	2–0	Bulgaria
5th–8th	**Hungary**	2–0	Netherlands
9th–12th	**Portugal**	W/O	Slovenia
Relegation	Bosnia and Herzegovina	0–2	**Luxembourg**

- **Poland** and **Great Britain** advanced to World Group II play-offs.
- Georgia and Bosnia and Herzegovina were relegated to Europe/Africa Group II in 2014.

=== Group II ===
Venue: Bellevue Club, Ulcinj, Montenegro (outdoor clay)

Dates: 17–20 April

==== Participating teams ====
- Estonia
- Finland
- Greece
- **Latvia**
- Lithuania
- Montenegro
- South Africa
- **Tunisia**

=== Group III ===
Venue: Terraten Club, Chișinău, Moldova (outdoor clay)

Dates: 8–11 May

==== Participating teams ====
- Armenia
- Cyprus
- Denmark
- **Egypt**
- Ireland
- Kenya
- **Liechtenstein**
- Madagascar
- Malta
- Moldova
- Morocco
- Namibia
- Norway

== Rankings ==
The rankings were measured after the three points during the year that play took place, and were collated by combining points earned from the previous four years.

11 February
Rank	Nation	Points	Move
1	Czech Republic	35,525.0	Steady
2	Italy	21,180.0	Steady
3	Russia	15,025.0	Steady
4	Serbia	12,272.5	Steady
5	Slovakia	9,017.5	▲3
6	United States	9,010.0	▼1
7	Australia	5,120.0	▼1
8	Japan	5,090.0	▼1
9	Germany	4,572.5	▲1
10	Spain	4,562.5	▲3

22 April
Rank	Nation	Points	Move
1	Czech Republic	32,430.0	Steady
2	Italy	24,285.0	Steady
3	Russia	19,655.0	Steady
4	Serbia	9,645.0	Steady
5	Slovakia	7,942.5	Steady
6	United States	7,482.5	Steady
7	Spain	5,900.0	▲3
8	Australia	5,870.0	▼1
9	Germany	5,670.0	Steady
10	Japan	4,552.5	▼2

4 November
Rank	Nation	Points	Move
1	Italy	28,375.0	▲1
2	Czech Republic	28,340.0	▼1
3	Russia	19,655.0	Steady
4	Serbia	9,645.0	Steady
5	Slovakia	7,942.5	Steady
6	United States	7,482.5	Steady
7	Spain	5,900.0	Steady
8	Australia	5,870.0	Steady
9	Germany	5,670.0	Steady
10	Japan	4,282.5	Steady

== See also ==
- 2013 Davis Cup
