= Alyssa Boey =

Malaysian tennis player (born 1996)

- Full name: Alyssa Chia Pheng Boey
- Country (sports): Malaysia
- Born: August 10, 1996 (age 29) Petaling Jaya, Malaysia
- Height: 1.65 m (5 ft 5 in)
- Plays: Right-handed (two-handed backhand)
- Prize money: $2,616

Singles
- Career record: 0–1
- Career titles: 0
- Highest ranking: —

Doubles
- Career record: 0–1
- Career titles: 0
- Highest ranking: —

Team competitions
- Fed Cup: 4–5
- Last updated on: 2 March 2015.

Alyssa Chia Pheng Boey (born 10 August 1996 in Petaling Jaya) is a Malaysian tennis player.

Boey made her WTA tour debut at the 2014 Malaysian Open, having received a wildcard with Yang Zi into the doubles tournament.

Playing for Malaysia at the Fed Cup, Boey has a win-loss record of 4–5.
