= Tin Patrimonio =

Filipina tennis player, model, actress and former reality show contestant

- Born: Anna Christine Conwi Patrimonio; December 29, 1991 (age 34); Cainta, Philippines
- Occupations: Actress, Singer, VJ, Dancer, athlete
- Years active: 2011–present
- Agent: Star Magic (2011–2012)
- Father: Alvin Patrimonio
- Relatives: Clarice (sister)
- Tennis career
- Country (sports): Philippines
- Height: 176 cm (5 ft 9 1/2 in)
- Plays: Right-handed (two-handed backhand)
- University: National University

Singles
- Career record: 1–5
- Career titles: 1

Doubles
- Career record: 3–2

Anna Christine "Tin" Conwi Patrimonio (born December 29, 1991) is a Filipino tennis player, model, actress and a former reality show contestant. She played for the National University Lady Bulldogs college varsity tennis team.

== Early life ==
Tin is the second child of Purefoods TJ Hotdogs basketball superstar Alvin Patrimonio and Cindy Conwi, with her older brother Angelo and younger siblings Clarice and Asher. Growing up, they were homeschooled. Instead of following in her father's footsteps whose sport was basketball, Tin chose the sport of tennis and started playing tennis aged 8. In 2005, Tin and Clarice trained in Valencia, Spain.

== Career ==
Patrimonio qualified for her first ITF-sanctioned tournament in 2008, making the main draw of the ITF Circuit Two. She then competed in the SEA Games in 2009. She made it to the finals of the Philippine Columbian Association (PCA) Open Tennis Championships in 2010, where she lost to Desirae Krawczyk.

Patrimonio led the Lady Bulldogs to 3 consecutive UAAP Tennis Championships from 2013 to 2015. She was named MVP in UAAP Season 76 and in the UAAP Season 78 women's lawn tennis tournament.

After her college career, Patrimonio competed in several more tournaments such as the PCA Open. She then transitioned to padel. She was on the team that competed at the Asia-Africa qualifiers for the World Padel Championship in 2024.

== Off the court ==
=== Personal life ===
Patrimonio and her partner Raymond Ronquillo, a businessman, have a daughter, Amariah. She was previously dating Kyle Dandan, a former pro tennis player as well. Her younger sister Clarice is a former tennis player who won two International Tennis Federation (ITF) juniors singles championships from 2010 to 2011. She took up AB English while at National University.

=== Modeling and endorsements ===
Patrimonio has been an model and spokesperson for several brands including Keds and Zalora. In 2020, she was the muse for the NorthPort Batang Pier during the opening of the PBA's 45th season.

=== Television and film appearances ===
Patrimonio participated in Pinoy Big Brother: Unlimited. She became the second athlete to enter the Bahay ni Kuya after Tricia Santos (a Palarong Pambansa veteran) in Teen Clash 2010. She didn't make it to the Big 4, as she was evicted just before the finale. After her eviction from the PBB house, she mentioned her openness to portray daring roles. She then portrayed Gabriela Silang in the indie film Gabriela in 2013 with Carlo Aquino as Diego Silang.

In 2021, Patrimonio and other female national SEA Games athletes participated in a "Bawal Judgmental" segment on Eat Bulaga!

== Filmography ==
=== Movies ===
Year	Title	Role	Ref.
2009	Dalaw	Kristy	
2012	Kimmy Dora and the Temple of Kiyeme		
2013	Gabriela	Gabriela Silang	

=== Television ===
Year	Title	Role	Notes	Ref.
2011–2012	Pinoy Big Brother: Unlimited	Housemate	Evicted before finale	
2020	Eat Bulaga!	Participant	Bawal Judgmental segment	

== Awards ==
=== UAAP ===
- UAAP Tennis tournament Most Valuable Player (Season 76, 78)
