= Yang Zi-Jun =

Hong Kong tennis player (born 1990)

- Country (sports): Hong Kong
- Residence: Hong Kong
- Born: 8 February 1990 (age 35) Hong Kong
- Turned pro: 2006
- Plays: Right-handed
- Prize money: $12,279

Singles
- Career record: 44–42
- Career titles: 1 ITF
- Highest ranking: No. 418 (30 November 2009)

Doubles
- Career record: 21–25
- Career titles: 1 ITF
- Highest ranking: No. 746 (26 July 2010)

Yang Zi-jun, also known as Jessica Yang (Chinese: 楊子君; Jyutping: joeng^{4} zi^{2} gwan^{1}, born February 8, 1990), is a former professional tennis player from Hong Kong and former member of the Hong Kong Fed Cup team (last match in 2012). She has a career-high ranking of No. 22 in the world in juniors.

== Tennis career ==
=== Juniors ===
She has reached the latter stages of many junior tournaments; she won the 2007 Girls Under-18 Toyota Open in Bangkok, Thailand, beating Khunpak Issara in straight sets.

In the 2008 Wimbledon girls' singles, where she just missed out on being seeded, she beat Anna Orlik of Belarus, 6–2, 6–1. Her run was halted in the second round when she was beaten by junior world No. 3, Arantxa Rus, 6–3, 6–0.

=== Professional ===
Her best performance in a professional tournament is reaching the second round of various tournaments; the Bangkok tournament in 2006, where she lost to Thassha Vitayaviroj; at another tournament in Bangkok in 2006, as a qualifier, she lost to Lee Jin-a; in Jakarta in 2006 where she lost to Lavinia Tananta, and the 2008 tournament in Bulungan where she lost in round two to second seed Liang Chen. All the tournaments are $10,000 tier tournaments, the lowest category of the ITF Women's Circuit.

== ITF Circuit finals ==
=== Singles (1–0) ===
| Result | Date | Location | Surface | Opponent | Score |
|---|---|---|---|---|---|
| Win | 10 May 2009 | Tarakan, Indonesia | Hard | (China) Yang Yi | 7–5, 6–1 |

=== Doubles (1–3) ===
| Result | W–L | Date | Location | Surface | Partner | Opponents | Score |
|---|---|---|---|---|---|---|---|
| Loss | 0–1 | 6 August 2006 | Bangkok, Thailand | Hard | (Thailand) Uthumporn Pudtra | (South Korea) Lee Jin-a (Thailand) Pichittra Thongdach | 2–6, 1–6 |
| Loss | 0–2 | 5 May 2008 | Tarakan, Indonesia | Hard | (Australia) Tiffany Welford | (Indonesia) Ayu Fani Damayanti (Indonesia) Liza Andriyani | 2–6, 3–6 |
| Win | 1–2 | 24 August 2009 | Nonthaburi, Thailand | Hard | (Hong Kong) Zhang Ling | (Indonesia) Beatrice Gumulya (Indonesia) Lavinia Tananta | 6–4, 6–3 |
| Loss | 1–3 | 11 April 2010 | Ningbo, China | Hard | (China) Lu Jiaxiang | (China) Wang Yafan (China) Yang Zhaoxuan | 6–1, 2–6, [4–10] |
