= Theiviya Selvarajoo =

Malaysian tennis player

- Country (sports): Malaysia
- Born: 20 June 1994 (age 32)
- Plays: Right (two-handed backhand)
- Prize money: $6,863

Singles
- Career record: 19–37
- Career titles: 0

Doubles
- Career record: 14–28
- Career titles: 1 ITF
- Highest ranking: No. 837 (17 April 2017)

Team competitions
- Fed Cup: 17–12
Medal record
Women's Tennis
Representing Malaysia
Islamic Solidarity Games
Bronze medal – third place	2017 Baku	Doubles
Southeast Asian Games
Bronze medal – third place	2015 Singapore	Team
Bronze medal – third place	2017 Kuala Lumpur	Doubles

Theiviya Selvarajoo (born 20 June 1994) is a Malaysian former tennis player.

Selvarajoo made her WTA Tour debut at the 2013 Malaysian Open, having received a wildcard with Yus Syazlin Nabila Binti Yusri into the doubles tournament. At the 2015 Malaysian Open, Selvarajoo received a wildcard into the doubles main draw with Jawairiah Noordin.

Playing for Malaysia at the Fed Cup, Selvarajoo has a win–loss record of 17–12.

== ITF Circuit finals ==
=== Doubles: 2 (1–1) ===
Legend $10,000 tournaments	Finals by surface Hard (1–1)

Result	No.	Date	Tournament	Surface	Partner	Opponents	Score
Win	1.	6 August 2016	Sharm el-Sheikh, Egypt	Hard	(Malaysia) Jawairiah Noordin	(Russia) Ksenia Laskutova (Ukraine) Kateryna Sliusar	7–5, 4–6, [12–10]
Loss	1.	1 October 2016	Sharm el-Sheikh, Egypt	Hard	(United Kingdom) Suzy Larkin	(Egypt) Ola Abou Zekry (India) Zeel Desai	5–7, 4–6
