= Sri Lanka Billie Jean King Cup team =

National tennis team

Sri Lanka
- Captain: Guyanga Weerasekera
- Nations Ranking: 76 (16 November 2015)
- Colors: yellow & blue
- First year: 1990
- Years played: 14
- Ties played (W–L): 52 (18–34)
- Best finish: Zonal Group II RR
- Most total wins: Lihini Weerasuriya (12–12)
- Most singles wins: Lihini Weerasuriya (8–7)
- Most doubles wins: Medhira Samarasinghe (5–2)
- Best doubles team: Amreetha Muttiah / Medhira Samarasinghe (4–2)
- Most ties played: Lihini Weerasuriya (15)
- Most years played: Lihini Weerasuriya (5)

The Sri Lanka Fed Cup team represents Sri Lanka in Fed Cup tennis competition and are governed by the Sri Lanka Tennis Association. They have not competed since 2001 with the exception of the 2008 tournament.

== History ==
Sri Lanka competed in its first Fed Cup in 1990. Their best result was reaching the final qualifying round in 1992 and 1993. In 2007, Sri Lanka were scheduled to compete in the Asia/Oceania Zone Group II in Christchurch, New Zealand, but, together with Syria, withdrew because of a terrorist threat. After competing in 2008, Sri Lanka were listed for the 2009 Asia/Oceania Zone Group II, but did not take part.

== See also ==
- Billie Jean King Cup
- Sri Lanka Davis Cup team
