= Indonesia Billie Jean King Cup team =

National tennis team

Indonesia
- ITF ranking: 41 ▲16
- Colors: Red & White
- First year: 1969
- Years played: 54
- Ties played (W–L): 198 (112–86)
- Years in World Group: 22 (11–22)
- Best finish: World Group QF (1973, 1991)
- Most total wins: Yayuk Basuki (62–28)
- Most singles wins: Wynne Prakusya (31–18)
- Most doubles wins: Yayuk Basuki (33–7)
- Best doubles team: Wynne Prakusya and Angelique Widjaja (16–0)
- Most ties played: Yayuk Basuki (59)
- Most years played: Yayuk Basuki (16)

The Indonesia Billie Jean King Cup team represents Indonesia in Billie Jean King Cup tennis competition and are governed by the Indonesian Tennis Association. They have not competed in the World Groups since 2006.

== History ==
Indonesia competed in its first Fed Cup in 1969. Their best result was reaching the quarterfinals in 1991.

In 2006, Indonesia qualified for World Group II, but refused to play Israel and forfeited their play-off match against the Israel Fed Cup team in Tel Aviv, and hence was relegated. Israel thus won by forfeit, and advanced to the 2007 Fed Cup World Group II. It was reported that the Indonesian Tennis Association was instructed to forfeit by the Indonesian government.

The International Tennis Federation's President Francesco Ricci Bitti said the Federation was saddened by the decision. The ITF fined the Indonesian Tennis Association $31,600, and banned it from 2007's tournament. The fine consisted of $20,000 to host Israel, $6,600 to compensate the ITF`s spending on preparations for the Israel Fed Cup, and $5,000 for pulling out of the match. Indonesia had been in the World Group II playoffs in 2007, but the sanction relegated Indonesia to Group II of the Asia/Oceanic Zone in 2008.

== Results ==
From 2008 to 2016, Indonesia largely alternated between Asia/Oceania Zone Group II and Group I. In the 2016 Fed Cup, was not able to achieve promotion to Group I, and hence will again start the 2017 campaign in Group II. Sri Utaminingsih was the Indonesian coach in 2016.

Year	Competition	Rank	Result	Players	Opponent	Score
2008	Asia/Oceania Zone Group I	5th	Remained in Group I	Sandy Gumulya; Ayu Fani Damayanti; Lavinia Tananta; Vivien Silfany Tony	Thailand	2–1
2009	Asia/Oceania Zone Group I	4th	Remained in Group I	Sandy Gumulya; Ayu Fani Damayanti; Lavinia Tananta; Jessy Rompies; Suzanna Anggarkusuma (Captain)	Thailand	0–3
2010	Asia/Oceania Zone Group I	8th	Relegated to Group II	Yayuk Basuki; Ayu Fani Damayanti; Lavinia Tananta; Jessy Rompies; Surya Wijaya Budi (Captain)	Uzbekistan	0–3
2011	Asia/Oceania Zone Group II	1st	Promoted to Group I	Ayu Fani Damayanti; Lavinia Tananta; Jessy Rompies; Yayuk Basuki	Hong Kong	2–1
2012	Asia/Oceania Zone Group I	7th	Relegated to Group II		Uzbekistan	0–3
2013	Asia/Oceania Zone Group II	1st	Promoted to Group I		Hong Kong	2–0
2014	Asia/Oceania Zone Group I	7th	Relegated to Group II	Vita Mediana, Tami Grende, Lavinia Tananta, Deria Nur Haliza	Chinese Taipei	2–0
2015	Asia/Oceania Zone Group II	3rd	Remained in Group II	Ayu Fani Damayanti, Lavinia Tananta, Deria Nur Haliza	Philippines	1–2
2016	Asia/Oceania Zone Group II	5th	Remained in Group II	Lavinia Tananta, Jessy Rompies, Deria Nur Haliza, Beatrice Gumulya	Pacific Oceania	2–0
2017	Asia/Oceania Zone Group II	3rd	Remained in Group II	Aldila Sutjiadi, Beatrice Gumulya, Jessy Rompies, Lavinia Tananta	Uzbekistan	1–2
2018	Asia/Oceania Zone Group II	1st	Promoted to Group I	Aldila Sutjiadi, Beatrice Gumulya, Deria Nur Haliza, Jessy Rompies	Uzbekistan	3–0
2019	Asia/Oceania Zone Group II	5th	Remained in Group I	Aldila Sutjiadi, Beatrice Gumulya, Jessy Rompies	Thailand	2–1

== See also ==
- Billie Jean King Cup
- Indonesia Davis Cup team
- Boycotts of Israel in individual sports
