= Tennis national team rankings =

The Nations Rankings are the current rankings of national teams by World Tennis in both men's and women's tennis. World Tennis produces the Davis Cup Nations Ranking for male national teams and the Billie Jean King Cup Nations Ranking for female national teams. Both measure the success of all nations participating in both competitions.

The Davis Cup Nations Ranking was launched at the end of 2001 and the Billie Jean King Cup Nations Ranking was introduced a year later. Both rankings are updated following every World Group round and are used for seeding the highest ranked teams in the draws for each group in the competitions' structures.

== Ranking method ==
The Davis Cup and Billie Jean King Cup rankings are based in a rolling four year cumulative system. However, the points total for each nation is calculated following a weighted sum formula, in which recent results are weighted more heavily. After each World Group round, the ranking period adjusts, and points earned in the last year period have a weighting factor of 100% in the points total. At the same time, the weighting factor for the points earned until the same round in the previous three years is reduced to 75% (for points earned one to two years ago), 50% (for points earned two to three years ago) and 25% (for points earned three to four years ago).

Ranking points are awarded only to the winning nation of a competition tie at every round. Victories in World Group rounds are worth more points than those in Zone Groups, and ties at the later rounds of the competition are progressively worth more points. Bonus points are also awarded for a nation that defeats a higher-ranked nation, but only if the latter nation is ranked in the top 64 for the Davis Cup, or in the top 75 for the Fed Cup. Unique to the Davis Cup, there is an additional bonus for a nation that wins a tie in the opponent's home ground: a 25% bonus is added to the total of round points and ranking bonus points (if any). At the Fed Cup only, nations that win by walkover are awarded round points but no bonus points, and no points are awarded for consolation events.

=== Men ===
The current ranking points and bonus points distribution tables for the Davis Cup are shown below:

Group	Round	Last year		1 to 2 years		2 to 3 years		3 to 4 years	
Group	Round	Away	Home	Away	Home	Away	Home	Away	Home
World Group	Final	10000	8000	7500	6000	5000	4000	2500	2000
World Group	Semifinals	7500	6000	5625	4500	3750	3000	1875	1500
World Group	Quarterfinals	5000	4000	3750	3000	2500	2000	1250	1000
World Group	1st Round	2500	2000	1875	1500	1250	1000	625	500
World Group	Play-offs	1250	1000	937.5	750	625	500	312,5	250
Group I	2nd Round	750	600^{3}	562.5	450	375	300	187.5	150
Group I	1st Round	500	400^{3}	375	300	250	200	125	100
Group I	Play-offs	400	320	300	240	200	160	100	80
Group II	3rd Round	250	200	187.5	150	125	100	62.5	50
Group II	2nd Round	150	120	112.5	90	75	60	37.5	30
Group II	1st Round	100	80	75	60	50	40	25	20
Group II	Play-offs	50	40	37.5	30	25	20	12.5	10
Group III^{2}	Round-robin & Play-offs (per win)	5		3.75		2.5		1.25	
Group IV^{2}	Round-robin & Play-offs (per win)	2		1.5		1		0.5	

Opponent Nation Ranking^{1}	Bonus Points	
Opponent Nation Ranking^{1}	Away	Home
1 to 2	125	100
3 to 4	112.5	90
5 to 8	93.75	75
9 to 16	62.5	50
17 to 32	50	40
33 to 64	31.25	25

Notes

^{1} Bonus points, as shown above, for defeating higher ranked nations will be added when appropriate to each tie in World Group, Group I and Group II.

^{2} Bonus points do not apply in Groups III and IV.

^{3} If the number of teams in Europe/Africa Groups I and II exceeds 16 or the number of teams in Asia/Oceania and Americas Groups I and II exceeds eight, then 200 points will be awarded for a first round win, 400 for a second round win and 600 for a third round win.

=== Women ===
The current ranking points and bonus points distribution tables for the Billie Jean King Cup are shown below:

Group	Round	Last year	1 to 2 years	2 to 3 years	3 to 4 years
World Group I	Final	8000	6000	4000	2000
World Group I	Semifinals	6000	4500	3000	1500
World Group I	1st Round	4000	3000	2000	1000
World Group I	Play-offs	2000	1500	1000	500
World Group II	1st Round	1500	1125	750	375
World Group II	Play-offs	1000	750	500	250
Group I	Round-robin & Play-offs	1000 points maximum^{2}			
Group II	Round-robin & Play-offs	400 points maximum^{2}			
Group III	Round-robin & Play-offs	160 points maximum^{2}			

Opponent Nation Ranking^{1}	Bonus Points
1	200
2 to 5	180
6 to 10	150
11 to 20	100
21 to 30	80
31 to 50	50
51 to 75	30

Notes

^{1} Bonus points, as shown above, for defeating higher ranked nations will be added when appropriate to each tie in World Group, Group I and Group II.

^{2} In the Groups I, II and III a nation's points are determined by its overall finishing position. Formats vary according to the numbers of nations playing each year so the value of each win alters too. However the maximum points a nation can win at each level remains constant.

== Current rankings ==
=== Men ===
Davis Cup Nations Ranking, as of 21 September 2026
Rank	Nation	Points	Move^{†}
1	Italy	584.5	Steady
2	Spain	476	Steady
3	Germany	459.25	Steady
4	Belgium	422.25	Steady
5	Czech Republic	418.75	▲2
6	Austria	409.5	▲3
7	United States	404.75	▼2
8	Canada	397.25	▲4
9	Australia	396	▼1
10	France	395.25	▼4
11	Great Britain	390	▲2
12	Argentina	382.25	▼2
13	Netherlands	380	▼2
14	South Korea	363.5	▲2
15	Hungary	352.25	▲2
16	Chile	350.5	▼2
17	Croatia	348.75	▼2
18	Brazil	342.25	Steady
19	Japan	337.75	▲6
20	Denmark	336.75	▲1

^{†}Change since previous ranking update

=== Women ===
Billie Jean King Cup Nations Ranking, as of 13 April 2026
#	Nation	Points	Move^{†}
1	Italy	1,252.50	Steady
2	Great Britain	1,178.75	▲1
3	Ukraine	1,066.25	▲5
4	Spain	1,061.25	▲1
5	Czech Republic	1,037.50	▲1
6	United States	1,021.25	▼4
7	Kazakhstan	988.75	▲2
8	Canada	921.25	▼4
9	Poland	887.50	▼2
10	Japan	868.75	Steady
11	Slovakia	848.75	Steady
12	Belgium	841.25	▲5
13	China	820.50	▲6
14	Australia	803.75	▼2
15	Netherlands	759.00	▼1
16	Switzerland	727.50	▼3
17	Romania	721.25	▼2
18	Slovenia	708.75	Steady
19	Brazil	701.25	▲1
20	Germany	662.50	▼4

^{†}Change since previous ranking update

== Number 1 ranked nations ==
=== Men ===
Key
*	Current number 1 nation as of February 03, 2025
^{↑}	Ranking record

No.	Nation	Start date	End date	WG rounds as No. 1	Total
1	Australia	December 3, 2001	February 10, 2002	1	1
2	France	February 11, 2002	November 30, 2003	7	7
	Australia (2)	December 1, 2003	April 11, 2004	2	3
	France (2)	April 12, 2004	September 26, 2004	1	8
3	Spain	September 27, 2004	December 4, 2005	5	5
4	Croatia	December 5, 2005	December 3, 2006	4	4
5	Russia	December 4, 2006	July 12, 2009	10	10
	Spain (2)	July 13, 2009	April 7, 2013	16	21
6	Czech Republic	April 8, 2013	November 29, 2015	10	10
7	Great Britain	November 30, 2015	November 27, 2016	4	4
8	Argentina	November 28, 2016	November 26, 2017	4	4
	France (3)	November 27, 2017	December 5, 2021	17 ^{↑}	25 ^{↑}
	Croatia (2)	December 6, 2021	February 5, 2023	6	10
9	Canada	February 6, 2023	November 26, 2023	3	3
10	Italy *	November 27, 2023	Present	8	8
No.	Nation	Start date	End date	WG rounds as No. 1	Total

=== Women ===
Key
*	Current number 1 nation as of April 17, 2023
^{↑}	Ranking record

No.	Nation	Start date	End date	WG rounds as No. 1	Total
1	Slovakia	November 4, 2002	November 23, 2003	4	4
2	France	November 24, 2003	September 18, 2005	7	7
3	Russia	September 19, 2005	November 8, 2009	12	12
4	Italy	November 9, 2009	April 22, 2012	8	8
5	Czech Republic	April 23, 2012	November 3, 2013	4	4
	Italy (2)	November 4, 2013	April 20, 2014	2	10
	Czech Republic (2)	April 21, 2014	November 10, 2019	16 ^{↑}	20 ^{↑}
	France (2)	November 11, 2019	November 7, 2021	8	15
6	Australia	November 8, 2021	April 16, 2023	4	4
7	Switzerland *	April 17, 2023	November 12, 2023	1	1
8	Canada	November 13, 2023	November 20, 2024	4	4
4	Italy (3) *	November 21, 2024	Present	6	16
No.	Nation	Start date	End date	WG rounds as No. 1	Total
