= Pakistan Billie Jean King Cup team =

Pakistan
- Captain: Mehboob Khan
- ITF ranking: 91 ▼ (11 April 2025)
- Colors: green & white
- First year: 1997
- Years played: 17
- Ties played (W–L): 74 (22–52)
- Best finish: Zonal Group II RR
- Most total wins: Ushna Suhail (27–48)
- Most singles wins: Ushna Suhail (16–30)
- Most doubles wins: Ushna Suhail (11–18)
- Best doubles team: Nosheen Ehtesham; Mariam Rahim (3-0) / Sara Mansoor; Ushna Suhail (3–9)
- Most ties played: Ushna Suhail (49)
- Most years played: Ushna Suhail (12)
- Last updated on: 11 April 2025.

The Pakistan Billie Jean King/Fed Cup team represents Pakistan in Billie Jean King Cup (formerly known as the Fed Cup) tennis competition, and is governed by the Pakistan Tennis Federation.

== History ==
Pakistan competed in its first Fed Cup in 1997. Their best result was finishing third in Group II in 1999.

== Fed Cup 2011 ==
Pakistan re-entered the Fed Cup in 2011 for the first time since 2000. It finished sixth in the Asia/Oceania Zone Group II and was represented in 2011 by its top players Sara Mahboob, Saba Aziz, Sara Mansoor, and Ushna Suhail.

== Fed Cup 2012 ==
In 2012, Pakistan competed in Asia/Oceania Zone Group II played in Shenzhen, China from 30 January to 4 February. Pakistan was represented by their non-playing captain and coach Muhammad Khalid, national number one player Saba Aziz, Ushna Suhail, and Sara Mansoor.

== Players ==
Name	Years	First	Ties	Win – Loss		
Name	Years	First	Ties	Singles	Doubles	Total
Saba Aziz	3	2011	10	1–6	0–3	1–9
Mehvish Chishtie	4	1997	11	2–7	1–3	3–10
Maheen Dada	1	2014	1	0–0	0–1	0–1
Nosheen Ehtesham	3	1997	10	0–1	6–3	6–4
Sara Haider	1	1997	1	0–0	0–1	0–1
Rida Khalid	1	2014	1	0–0	0–1	0–1
Meheq Khokhar	2	2019	4	0–1	1–3	1–4
Sarah Mahboob Khan	6	2011	21	3–13	2–6	5–19
Noor Malik	1	2019	2	0–0	1–1	1–1
Sara Mansoor	9	2011	30	5–10	5–16	10–26
Iman Qureshi	2	2013	8	1–2	1–4	2–6
Mahin Qureshi	3	2017	10	1–6	3–5	4–11
Haleema Rahim	3	1998	11	3–8	1–2	4–10
Mariam Rahim	2	1998	5	2–0	4–1	6–1
Ushna Suhail	9	2011	38	12–23	9–16	21–39
Nida Waseem	3	1997	13	4–9	4–6	8–15

== See also ==
- Billie Jean King Cup
- Pakistan Davis Cup team
