= Malaysia Billie Jean King Cup team =

National tennis team

Malaysia
- Captain: Koay Hao Sheng
- Nations Ranking: 61 (14 April 2025)
- Colors: yellow & black
- First year: 1989
- Years played: 18
- Ties played (W–L): 67 (31–36)
- Best finish: Zonal Group I RR
- Most total wins: Khoo Chin-bee (25–17)
- Most singles wins: Khoo Chin-bee (14–11)
- Most doubles wins: Khoo Chin-bee (11–6)
- Best doubles team: Khoo Chin-bee / Tan Lynn-Yin (4–3)
- Most ties played: Khoo Chin-bee (26)
- Most years played: Khoo Chin-bee (7)

The Malaysia Fed Cup team represents Malaysia in Fed Cup tennis competition and are governed by the Lawn Tennis Association of Malaysia. They did not compete during 2003 to 2012. In 2013 they made their return to Fed Cup finishing 6th in the Asia/Oceania Zone Group II.

== History ==
Malaysia competed in its first Fed Cup in 1989. Their best result was finishing seventh in Group I Asia/Oceania zone in 1996.

== Current team ==
- Elsa Wan
- Saw Jo-Leen
- Lim Zan Ning
- Hannah Yip

== See also ==
- Billie Jean King Cup
- Malaysia Davis Cup team
