= Singapore Billie Jean King Cup team =

National tennis team

Singapore
- Captain: Daniel Heryanta Dewandaka
- Nations Ranking: 56 (14 November 2016)
- First year: 1989
- Years played: 24
- Ties played (W–L): 90 (32–58)
- Best finish: Zonal Group I RR
- Most total wins: Wong Rui-Jing (20–6)
- Most singles wins: Wong Rui-Jing (12–3)
- Most doubles wins: Wong Rui-Jing (8–3)
- Best doubles team: Leong Jil-Lin / Wong Rui-Jing (5–2)
- Most ties played: Stefanie Tan (21)
- Most years played: Stefanie Tan (6)

The Singapore Fed Cup team represents Singapore in Fed Cup tennis competition and are governed by the Singapore Tennis Association. They currently compete in the Group II Asia/Oceania Zone.

== History ==
Singapore competed in its first Fed Cup in 1989. Their best result was 9th in Asia/Oceania Group I in 2007.

== Players ==
Name	Years	First	Ties	Win – Loss		
Name	Years	First	Ties	Singles	Doubles	Total
Geraldine Ang	3	2012	13	4–8	2–5	6–13
Vanessa Boey	2	2006	6	1–4	2–0	3–4
Hannah En Zin Chew	1	2012	5	1–4	0–0	1–4
Chew I-Jin	1	1997	2	0–0	2–0	2–0
Ming Ming Joy Chia	1	2011	1	0–0	0–1	0–1
Angeline Devi Devanthiran	1	2015	2	0–2	0–1	0–3
Rheeya Doshi	2	2013	8	3–5	1–2	4–7
Clare Fong	2	2010	7	2–2	2–4	4–6
Celina Goetti	2	2007	5	1–2	1–2	2–4
Goh Yee-loon	1	2016	4	0–1	0–4	0–5
Tina Jacob	3	2000	12	0–5	1–7	1–12
Rehmat Johal	2	2012	6	0–0	2–4	2–4
Julienne Si Ying Keong	2	2009	4	0–2	1–1	1–3
Beier Ko	1	2007	5	3–2	0–3	3–5
Olivia Koh Ee Yi	1	2012	5	0–0	2–3	2–3
Joanne Koh	2	2014	3	0–0	0–3	0–3
Sonya Kumar	2	2001	7	1–3	1–5	2–8
Lai Wei-Yen	1	1996	3	0–1	1–1	1–2
Lee King-See	1	1999	1	0–0	0–1	0–1
Lee Wei-ping	4	2004	15	7–7	1–7	8–14
Leong Jil-Lin	5	1995	17	7–9	6–5	13–14
Leong Shieh-Yen	1	1996	3	1–1	1–2	2–3
Leow Yik-Hui	3	1999	11	1–8	0–6	1–14
Angela Shan Min Lim	1	2017	2	0–0	1–1	1–1
Dionne Lim	3	1993	8	0–6	1–5	1–11
Laura Lim	1	2008	1	0–0	0–1	0–1
Lynelle En Tong Lim	3	2017	7	1–4	0–2	1–6
Carolyn Ann Lim Hui	2	2008	4	0–1	1–2	1–3
Agustine Limanto	2	2001	7	2–4	0–1	2–5
Simin Liu (tennis)	1	2000	4	0–1	0–2	0–3
Nozelina Lukeman	2	1989	3	0–0	0–3	0–3
Ng Yun-Ling	3	2004	10	0–4	0–6	0–10
Ong Shao-Fang	1	2005	4	0–3	0–1	0–4
Sarah Pang	2	2015	6	1–2	0–4	1–6
Charmaine Shi Yi Seah	4	2016	14	9–3	3–3	12–6
Stefanie Tan	7	2007	24	13–9	6–6	19–15
Tammy Tan	2	2018	6	0–1	0–4	0–5
Valerie Tan	1	1989	2	0–2	0–1	0–3
Tan Yee-Hong	1	1998	2	1–0	1–1	2–1
Y-kit Nicole Tan	1	2017	3	1–2	0–1	1–3
Izabella Tan Hui-xin	2	2019	6	3–1	1–2	4–3
Lynette Tay	1	1994	2	0–0	0–2	0–2
Tong Pei-Ling	1	2004	3	0–1	0–2	0–3
Khee Yen Wee	4	2010	9	0–4	1–4	1–8
Wong Rui-Jing	4	1997	16	12–3	8–3	20–6
Ashley Kei Yim	2	2016	7	1–0	2–4	3–4
Caroline Young	1	1989	1	0–0	0–1	0–1
Lena Zainal	3	1989	8	1–7	1–4	2–11
Norzahara Zainal	1	1993	3	0–3	0–1	0–4

== See also ==
- Billie Jean King Cup
- Singapore Davis Cup team
