= Kyrgyzstan Billie Jean King Cup team =

Tennis team representing Kyrgyzstan

Kyrgyzstan
- Captain: Marat Tenizbaev
- Nations Ranking: 78 (16 November 2015)
- Colors: red & white
- First year: 2002
- Years played: 7
- Ties played (W–L): 28 (9–19)
- Best finish: Zonal Group II Promotional Play-off (2010)
- Most total wins: Bermet Duvanaeva (16–8)
- Most singles wins: Bermet Duvanaeva (11–4)
- Most doubles wins: Bermet Duvanaeva (5–4)
- Best doubles team: Bermet Duvanaeva / Ksenia Palkina (2–0)
- Most ties played: Bermet Duvanaeva (15)
- Most years played: Bermet Duvanaeva (3)

The Kyrgyzstan Fed Cup team represents Kyrgyzstan in Fed Cup tennis competition and is governed by the Kyrgyzstan Tennis Federation.

Kyrgyzstan competed in Asia/Oceania Zone Group II in 2011.

== History ==
Kyrgyzstan competed in its first Fed Cup in 2003. Their best result was finishing runner-up in the Asia/Oceania Zone Group II in 2010, beating Philippines, Syria and Hong Kong, before losing to India in the promotion play-off. Prior to 1993, Kyrgyzstan players represented the Soviet Union.

== See also ==
- Billie Jean King Cup
- Kyrgyzstan Davis Cup team
