= Hong Kong Billie Jean King Cup team =

National tennis team

Hong Kong
- Captain: Karan Rastogi
- ITF ranking: 41 ▲10 (14 April 2025)
- Colors: red & White
- First year: 1981
- Years played: 31
- Ties played (W–L): 121 (59–58)
- Years in World Group: 5 (2–5)
- Best finish: World Group 2R (1982, 1990)
- Most total wins: Ling Zhang (37–26)
- Most singles wins: Ling Zhang (28–15)
- Most doubles wins: Ling Zhang (9–11)
- Best doubles team: Patricia Hy / Paulette Moreno (6–3)
- Most ties played: Ling Zhang (44)
- Most years played: Ling Zhang (11)

The Hong Kong Billie Jean King Cup team represents Hong Kong in the Billie Jean King Cup tennis competition and are governed by the Hong Kong Tennis Association. They will compete in the Asia/Oceania Zone Group II in 2022.

== Team members ==
2015 Fed Cup Asia/Oceania Zone Group I – Pool A ties:

- Ling Zhang
- Sher Chun-wing
- Wu Ho-ching
- Ng Man-ying

2022 Fed Cup Asia/Oceania Zone Group II – Pool A ties:

- Eudice Chong
- Adithya Karunaratne
- Cody Wong
- Wu Ho-ching
- Ng Man-ying

== History ==
Hong Kong competed in its first Fed Cup in 1981. Their best result was reaching the round of 16 in 1982 and 1990.

== See also ==
- Billie Jean King Cup
- Hong Kong Davis Cup team
