= 2013 Fed Cup Asia/Oceania Zone Group II – play-offs =

Women's tennis matches

The play-offs of the 2013 Fed Cup Asia/Oceania Zone Group II were the final stages of the Group II Zonal Competition involving teams from Asia and Oceania. Using the positions determined in their pools, the eleven teams faced off to determine their placing in the 2013 Fed Cup Asia/Oceania Zone Group II. The top team advanced to 2014 Asia/Oceania Zone Group I.

Placing	Pool A	Pool B
1	Hong Kong	Indonesia
2	New Zealand	Philippines
3	Vietnam	Malaysia
4	Turkmenistan	Kyrgyzstan
5	Singapore	Pakistan
6	–	Iran

== Promotional Round ==
The first placed teams of each pool played in a head-to-head round. The winner advanced to the Group I for 2014.

=== Hong Kong vs. Indonesia ===
Hong Kong
0
National Tennis Centre, Astana, Kazakhstan
February 9, 2013
RuKortHard Tournament F Hard (indoors)

Indonesia
2

			1	2	3
1	(Hong Kong) (Indonesia)	Katherine Ip; Lavinia Tananta	1; 6	6; 4	6^{4} 7^{7}
2	(Hong Kong) (Indonesia)	Venise Chan; Ayu Fani Damayanti	2; 6	3; 6
3	(Hong Kong) (Indonesia)	Venise Chan / Katherine Ip; Ayu Fani Damayanti / Aldila Sutjiadi				not played

== 3rd to 4th play-off ==
The second placed teams of each pool played in a head-to-head round to find the third and fourth placed teams.

=== New Zealand vs. Philippines ===
New Zealand
2
National Tennis Centre, Astana, Kazakhstan
February 9, 2013
RuKortHard Tournament F Hard (indoors)

Philippines
0

			1	2	3
1	(New Zealand) (Philippines)	Abigail Guthrie; Anna Clarice Patrimonio	6; 0	6; 3
2	(New Zealand) (Philippines)	Emily Fanning; Marinel Rudas	6; 4	6; 3
3	(New Zealand) (Philippines)	Abigail Guthrie / Emma Hayman; Marian Jade Capadocia / Anna Clarice Patrimonio				not played

== 5th to 6th play-off ==
The third placed teams of each pool played in a head-to-head round to find the fifth and sixth placed teams.

=== Vietnam vs. Malaysia ===
Vietnam
3
National Tennis Centre, Astana, Kazakhstan
February 9, 2013
RuKortHard Tournament F Hard (indoors)

Malaysia
0

			1	2	3
1	(Vietnam) (Malaysia)	Trần Thị Tâm Hảo; Theiviya Selvarajoo	6; 3	3; 6	6; 3
2	(Vietnam) (Malaysia)	Huỳnh Phương Đài Trang; Alyssa Boey	6; 1	6; 0
3	(Vietnam) (Malaysia)	Phi Khánh Huỳnh / Nguyễn Ái Ngọc Vân; Aslina Chua / Nurin Nabilah Roslan	7^{7} 6^{5}	6; 2

== 7th to 8th play-off ==
The fourth placed teams of each pool played in a head-to-head round to find the seventh and eighth placed teams.

=== Turkmenistan vs. Kyrgyzstan ===
Turkmenistan
3
National Tennis Centre, Astana, Kazakhstan
February 9, 2013
RuKortHard Tournament F Hard (indoors)

Kyrgyzstan
0

			1	2	3
1	(Turkmenistan) (Kyrgyzstan)	Jahana Bayramova; Arina Beliaeva	4; 6	6; 0	6; 4
2	(Turkmenistan) (Kyrgyzstan)	Anastasiya Prenko; Bermet Duvanaeva	6; 3	3; 6	6; 0
3	(Turkmenistan) (Kyrgyzstan)	Jahana Bayramova / Anastasiya Prenko; Arina Beliaeva / Sabina Korsunova	6; 1	6; 1

== 9th to 10th play-off ==
The fifth placed teams of each pool played in a head-to-head round to find the ninth and tenth placed teams.

=== Singapore vs. Pakistan ===
Singapore
3
National Tennis Centre, Astana, Kazakhstan
February 9, 2013
RuKortHard Tournament F Hard (indoors)

Pakistan
0

			1	2	3
1	(Singapore) (Pakistan)	Geraldine Ang; Sara Mansoor	6; 4	6; 1
2	(Singapore) (Pakistan)	Rheeya Doshi; Ushna Suhail	6; 2	4; 6	6; 4
3	(Singapore) (Pakistan)	Rheeya Doshi / Wee Khee-yen; Saba Aziz / Sara Mansoor	3; 6	6; 2	7^{7} 6^{2}

== Final Placements ==
Placing	Teams
Promoted	Indonesia
Second	Hong Kong
Third	New Zealand
Fourth	Philippines
Fifth	Vietnam
Sixth	Malaysia
Seventh	Turkmenistan
Eighth	Kyrgyzstan
Ninth	Singapore
Tenth	Pakistan
Eleventh	Iran

- Indonesia advanced to the Fed Cup Asia/Oceania Zone Group I for 2014, but they placed last in their pool and thus was sent to the relegation play-offs. They lost, and therefore was relegated back to Group II for 2015.

== See also ==
- Fed Cup structure
