= 2014 Fed Cup Asia/Oceania Zone Group II – play-offs =

The play-offs of the 2014 Fed Cup Asia/Oceania Zone Group II were the final stages of the Group II Zonal Competition involving teams from Asia and Oceania. Using the positions determined in their pools, the thirteen teams faced off to determine their placing in the 2014 Fed Cup Asia/Oceania Zone Group II. The top team advanced to Asia/Oceania Group I in 2015.

== Pool results ==
Placing	Pool A	Pool B	Pool C	Pool D
1	Hong Kong	Philippines	Turkmenistan	India
2	Malaysia	Singapore	Kyrgyzstan	New Zealand
3	Vietnam	Sri Lanka	Iraq	Iran
4	N/A	N/A	N/A	Pakistan

== 1st to 4th play-offs ==
The first placed teams of the pools were drawn in head-to-head rounds.

=== Hong Kong vs. India ===
Hong Kong
2
National Tennis Centre, Astana, Kazakhstan
7 February 2014
Hard (indoors)

India
1

			1	2	3
1	(Hong Kong) (India)	Eudice Chong; Prarthana Thombare	6; 2	6; 1
2	(Hong Kong) (India)	Zhang Ling; Ankita Raina	6; 3	6; 4
3	(Hong Kong) (India)	Ng Kwan-yau / Wu Ho-ching; Ankita Raina / Rishika Sunkara	2; 6	1; 6

=== Philippines vs. Turkmenistan ===
Philippines
3
National Tennis Centre, Astana, Kazakhstan
7 February 2014
Hard (indoors)

Turkmenistan
0

			1	2	3
1	(Philippines) (Turkmenistan)	Anna Clarice Patrimonio; Jahana Bayramova	6; 2	6; 0
2	(Philippines) (Turkmenistan)	Marian Jade Capadocia; Anastasiya Prenko	4; 6	6; 4	6; 0
3	(Philippines) (Turkmenistan)	Marian Jade Capadocia / Anna Clarice Patrimonio; Jahana Bayramova / Guljahan Kadyrova	6; 1	6; 1

== Promotion play-off ==
The winners of the 1st to 4th play-offs then played against each other for promotion. The winner advances to the Asia/Oceania Group I in 2015.

=== Hong Kong vs. Philippines ===
Hong Kong
2
National Tennis Centre, Astana, Kazakhstan
8 February 2014
Hard (indoors)

Philippines
1

			1	2	3
1	(Hong Kong) (Philippines)	Eudice Chong; Anna Clarice Patrimonio	6; 4	6; 1
2	(Hong Kong) (Philippines)	Zhang Ling; Marian Jade Capadocia	6; 1	6; 4
3	(Hong Kong) (Philippines)	Ng Kwan-yau / Wu Ho-ching; Marian Jade Capadocia / Anna Clarice Patrimonio	5; 7	3; 6

== 5th to 8th play-offs ==
The second placed teams of the pools were drawn in head-to-head rounds to find the fifth to eighth placed teams.

=== Malaysia vs. New Zealand ===
Malaysia
0
National Tennis Centre, Astana, Kazakhstan
7 February 2014
Hard (indoors)

New Zealand
3

			1	2	3
1	(Malaysia) (New Zealand)	Aslina Chua An Ping; Emma Hayman	2; 6	3; 6
2	(Malaysia) (New Zealand)	Alyssa Boey; Marina Erakovic	2; 6	0; 6
3	(Malaysia) (New Zealand)	Michelle Li Sha Khoo / Yus Syazlin Nabila Binti Yusri; Abigail Guthrie / Dianne Hollands	1; 6	0; 6

=== Singapore vs. Kyrgyzstan ===
Singapore
2
National Tennis Centre, Astana, Kazakhstan
7 February 2014
Hard (indoors)

Kyrgyzstan
1

			1	2	3
1	(Singapore) (Kyrgyzstan)	Geraldine Ang; Inna Volkovich	2; 6	6^{2} 7^{7}
2	(Singapore) (Kyrgyzstan)	Rheeya Doshi; Alina Lazareva	6; 1	6; 1
3	(Singapore) (Kyrgyzstan)	Geraldine Ang / Rheeya Doshi; Alina Lazareva / Inna Volkovich	6; 1	6; 2

== 9th to 12th play-offs ==
The third placed teams of the two pools were drawn in head-to-head rounds to find the 9th to 12th placed teams.

=== Vietnam vs. Iran ===
Vietnam
3
National Tennis Centre, Astana, Kazakhstan
7 February 2014
Hard (indoors)

Iran
0

			1	2	3
1	(Vietnam) (Iran)	Trần Thị Tâm Hảo; Ghazal Pakbaten	6; 1	6; 0
2	(Vietnam) (Iran)	Huỳnh Phi Khanh; Sahar Amini Hajibashi	7^{7} 6^{5}	4; 6	7; 5
3	(Vietnam) (Iran)	Đào Minh Trang / Phan Thị Thanh Bình; Ghazal Pakbaten / Sahar Amini Hajibashi	1; 6	6; 2	6; 2

=== Sri Lanka vs. Iraq ===
Sri Lanka
3
National Tennis Centre, Astana, Kazakhstan
7 February 2014
Hard (indoors)

Iraq
0

			1	2	3
1	(Sri Lanka) (Iraq)	Nethmi Himashi Waduge; Halla Alajeely	6; 3	6; 2
2	(Sri Lanka) (Iraq)	Amreetha Muttiah; Ghada Alajeely	6; 0	6; 1
3	(Sri Lanka) (Iraq)	Kemalie Herath / Medhira Samarasinghe; Ghada Alajeely / Halla Alajeely	6; 3	6; 1

== Final placements ==
Placing	Teams
Promoted	Hong Kong
Second	Philippines
Third	India / Turkmenistan
Fifth	New Zealand / Singapore
Seventh	Malaysia / Kyrgyzstan
Ninth	Vietnam / Sri Lanka
Eleventh	Iran / Iraq
Thirteenth	Pakistan

- Hong Kong advanced to Asia/Oceania Zone Group I in 2015.

== See also ==
- Fed Cup structure
