= Wu Ho-ching =

Hong Kong tennis player

Wu Ho-ching 胡可澄
- Residence: Hong Kong
- Born: 30 August 1991 (age 34) Hong Kong
- Plays: Right-handed (two-handed backhand)
- Prize money: $99,071

Singles
- Career record: 263–250
- Career titles: 4 ITF
- Highest ranking: No. 536 (2 March 2020)
- Current ranking: No. 757 (7 April 2025)

Doubles
- Career record: 98–183
- Career titles: 2 ITF
- Highest ranking: No. 517 (23 September 2024)
- Current ranking: No. 621 (4 March 2024)

Team competitions
- Fed Cup: 23–20
- Last updated on: 4 March 2024.

Wu Ho-ching (Chinese: 胡可澄; Jyutping: Wu4 Ho2cing4; Cantonese pronunciation: [wu˩ hɔ˧˥ tsʰɪŋ˩]; born 30 August 1991) is a Hong Kong–based tennis player.

== Career ==
On 2 March 2020, she reached her best singles ranking of world No. 536. She also has a career-high WTA doubles ranking of 566.

Wu made her WTA Tour debut at the 2014 Hong Kong Tennis Open, having received a wildcard with Venise Chan in the doubles tournament, but lost to Karolína and Kristýna Plíšková in the first round.

Playing for Hong Kong Fed Cup team, Wu has a win–loss record of 20–16 in Fed Cup competition and has played in 33 ties, being the second most Hong Kong player behind Zhang Ling.

== ITF Circuit finals ==
=== Singles: 8 (4 titles, 4 runner-ups) ===
Legend
W15 tournaments

Result	W–L	Date	Tournament	Tier	Surface	Opponent	Score
Win	1–0	Jun 2018	ITF Sangju, South Korea	W15	Hard (i)	(Chinese Taipei) Lee Ya-hsuan	7–5, 6–3
Win	2–0	Jul 2018	ITF Taipei, Taiwan	W15	Hard	(Chinese Taipei) Lee Pei-Chi	3–6, 5–4 ret.
Loss	2–1	May 2022	ITF Cancún, Mexico	W15	Hard	(United States) Dasha Ivanova	6–0, 3–6, 4–6
Loss	2–2	Feb 2023	ITF Sharm El Sheikh, Egypt	W15	Hard	Darya Shauha	6–4, 3–6, 3–6
Loss	2–3	Mar 2023	ITF Sharm El Sheikh, Egypt	W15	Hard	(Slovakia) Katarina Kuzmova	2–6, 6–7^{(0)}
Win	3–3	Apr 2023	ITF Singapore, Singapore	W15	Hard	(China) Ren Yufei	1–6, 6–1, 6–1
Win	4–3	Feb 2024	ITF Ipoh, Malaysia	W15	Hard	(Japan) Lisa-Marie Rioux	6–2, 6–3
Loss	4–4	May 2024	ITF Toyama, Japan	W15	Hard	(Japan) Kayo Nishimura	4–6, 5–7

=== Doubles: 7 (3 titles, 4 runner-ups) ===
Legend
W15 tournaments

Result	W–L	Date	Tournament	Tier	Surface	Partner	Opponent	Score
Win	1–0	Jul 2018	ITF Hong Kong	W15	Hard	(Hong Kong) Ng Kwan-yau	(India) Zeel Desai (Japan) Akari Inoue	6–4, 6–4
Loss	1–1	Oct 2021	ITF Sharm El Sheikh, Egypt	W15	Hard	(Japan) Eri Shimizu	(Hong Kong) Eudice Chong (Hong Kong) Cody Wong	2–6, 0–6
Loss	1–2	Apr 2022	ITF Chiang Rai, Thailand	W15	Hard	(Hong Kong) Maggie Ng	(China) Gao Xinyu (China) Xun Fangying	3–6, 6–7^{(4)}
Loss	1–3	Feb 2023	ITF Sharm El Sheikh, Egypt	W15	Hard	(Turkey) Doğa Türkmen	(Italy) Giuliana Bestetti (Italy) Beatrice Stagno	5–7, 2–6
Win	2–3	Mar 2023	ITF Sharm El Sheikh, Egypt	W15	Hard	(Japan) Mei Hasegawa	(Russia) Aglaya Fedorova (Slovakia) Katarína Kužmová	w/o
Loss	2–4	Mar 2023	ITF Sharm El Sheikh, Egypt	W15	Hard	(Japan) Mei Hasegawa	(Canada) Louise Kwong (United States) Anna Ulyashchenko	6–3, 1–6, [5–10]
Win	3–4	May 2025	ITF Maanshan, China	W15	Hard (i)	(China) Yang Yidi	(China) Aitiyaguli Aixirefu (China) Zhu Chenting	5–7, 6–4, [10–7]

== Fed Cup participation ==
=== Singles (3–0) ===
Edition	Stage	Date	Location	Against	Surface	Opponent	W/L	Score
2011	Z2 R/R	Feb 2011	Nonthaburi, Thailand	(Oman) Oman	Hard	Sarah Al-Balushi	W	6–0, 6–1
2013	Z2 R/R	Feb 2013	Astana, Kazakhstan	Turkmenistan	Hard (i)	Jahana Bayramova	W	6–0, 6–0
2014	Z2 R/R	Feb 2014	Astana, Kazakhstan	Vietnam	Hard (i)	Trần Thị Tâm Hảo	W	6–3, 6–2

=== Doubles (6–5) ===
Edition	Stage	Date	Location	Against	Surface	Partner	Opponents	W/L	Score
2009	Z2 R/R	Feb 2009	Perth, Australia	Iran	Hard	Sher Pui-wing	Madona Najarian; Shadi Tabatabai	W	6–2, 7–5
2010	Z2 R/R	Feb 2010	Kuala Lumpur, Malaysia	Syria	Hard	Lam Ko-puen	Diana Makki; Kett Sadi	W	6–0, 6–2
2010	Z2 P/O	Feb 2010	Kuala Lumpur, Malaysia	Malaysia	Hard	Yang Zi-jun	Khoo Chin-bee; Jawairiah Noordin	L	1–6, 3–6
2011	Z2 R/R	Feb 2011	Nonthaburi, Thailand	Turkmenistan	Hard	Zhang Ling	Jenneta Haliyeva; Anastasiya Prenko	W	6–0, 6–3
2011	Z2 R/R	Feb 2011	Nonthaburi, Thailand	Singapore	Hard	Zhang Ling	Clare Fong; Wee Khee-yen	W	6–0, 6–0
2011	Z2 P/O	Feb 2011	Nonthaburi, Thailand	Indonesia	Hard	Zhang Ling	Yayuk Basuki; Jessy Rompies	L	1–6, 6–4, 4–6
2013	Z2 R/R	Feb 2013	Astana, Kazakhstan	Singapore	Hard (i)	Venise Chan	Rehmat Johal; Wee Khee-yen	W	6–0, 6–1
2013	Z2 R/R	Feb 2013	Astana, Kazakhstan	New Zealand	Hard (i)	Venise Chan	Abigail Guthrie; Emma Hayman	L	6–7^{(5–7)}, 4–6
2014	Z2 R/R	Feb 2014	Astana, Kazakhstan	Malaysia	Hard (i)	Ng Kwan-yau	Yus Syazlin Nabila Binti Yusri; Michelle Li Sha Khoo	W	6–1, 6–2
2014	Z2 P/O	Feb 2014	Astana, Kazakhstan	India	Hard (i)	Ng Kwan-yau	Ankita Raina; Rishika Sunkara	L	2–6, 1–6
2014	Z2 P/O	Feb 2014	Astana, Kazakhstan	Philippines	Hard (i)	Ng Kwan-yau	Marian Jade Capadocia; Anna Clarice Patrimonio	L	5–7, 3–6
