= 2013 Fed Cup Asia/Oceania Zone Group II – Pool A =

Group A of the 2013 Fed Cup Asia/Oceania Zone Group II was one of two pools in the Asia/Oceania zone of the 2013 Fed Cup. Five teams competed in a round robin competition, with the teams proceeding to their respective sections of the play-offs: the top team played for advancement to the 2014 Group I.

== Standings ==
		(Hong Kong) HKG	(New Zealand) NZL	(Turkmenistan) TKM	(Singapore) SIN	(Vietnam) VIE	RR; W–L	Match; W–L	Set; W–L	Game; W–L
47	Hong Kong		2–1	3–0	3–0	3–0	11–1	22–4	148–57	1
59	New Zealand	1–2		3–0	3–0	3–0	13–2	21–6	142–72	2
64	Turkmenistan	0–3	0–3		2–1	0–3	2–10	5–21	82–139	4
71	Singapore	0–3	0–3	1–2		0–3	1–11	3–22	43–145	5
	Vietnam	0–3	0–3	3–0	3–0		6–6	14–15	112–117	3

== Round robin ==
=== Hong Kong vs. Turkmenistan ===
Hong Kong
3
National Tennis Centre, Astana, Kazakhstan
February 4, 2013
RuKortHard Tournament F Hard (indoors)

Turkmenistan
0

			1	2	3
1	(Hong Kong) (Turkmenistan)	Wu Ho-ching; Jahana Bayramova	6; 0	6; 0
2	(Hong Kong) (Turkmenistan)	Venise Chan; Anastasiya Prenko	2; 6	6; 3	7; 5
3	(Hong Kong) (Turkmenistan)	Eudice Chong / Katherine Ip; Jahana Bayramova / Jenneta Halliyeva	6; 0	6; 0

=== Singapore vs. Vietnam ===
Singapore
0
National Tennis Centre, Astana, Kazakhstan
February 4, 2013
RuKortHard Tournament F Hard (indoors)

Vietnam
3

			1	2	3
1	(Singapore) (Vietnam)	Geraldine Ang; Trần Thị Tâm Hảo	0; 6	3; 6
2	(Singapore) (Vietnam)	Rheeya Doshi; Huỳnh Phương Đài Trang	3; 6	0; 6
3	(Singapore) (Vietnam)	Rheeya Doshi / Wee Khee-yen; Nguyễn Ái Ngọc Vân / Huỳnh Phi Khanh	1; 6	3; 6

=== Hong Kong vs. Singapore ===
Hong Kong
3
National Tennis Centre, Astana, Kazakhstan
February 5, 2013
RuKortHard Tournament F Hard (indoors)

Singapore
0

			1	2	3
1	(Hong Kong) (Singapore)	Eudice Chong; Geraldine Ang	6; 2	6; 2
2	(Hong Kong) (Singapore)	Katherine Ip; Rheeya Doshi	6; 3	6; 0
3	(Hong Kong) (Singapore)	Venise Chan / Wu Ho-ching; Rehmat Johal / Wee Khee-yen	6; 0	6; 1

=== New Zealand vs. Vietnam ===
New Zealand
3
National Tennis Centre, Astana, Kazakhstan
February 5, 2013
RuKortHard Tournament F Hard (indoors)

Vietnam
0

			1	2	3
1	(New Zealand) (Vietnam)	Emily Fanning; Trần Thị Tâm Hảo	4; 6	7^{7} 6^{2}	6; 0
2	(New Zealand) (Vietnam)	Marina Erakovic; Huỳnh Phương Đài Trang	6; 0	6; 2
3	(New Zealand) (Vietnam)	Abigail Guthrie / Emma Hayman; Huỳnh Phương Đài Trang / Trần Thị Tâm Hảo	4; 6	6; 3	6; 4

=== Hong Kong vs. New Zealand ===
Hong Kong
2
National Tennis Centre, Astana, Kazakhstan
February 6, 2013
RuKortHard Tournament F Hard (indoors)

New Zealand
1

			1	2	3
1	(Hong Kong) (New Zealand)	Katherine Ip; Emma Hayman	6; 2	6; 2
2	(Hong Kong) (New Zealand)	Venise Chan; Emily Fanning	6; 1	3; 6	6; 1
3	(Hong Kong) (New Zealand)	Venise Chan / Katherine Ip; Abigail Guthrie / Emma Hayman	6^{5} 7^{7}	4; 6

=== Turkmenistan vs. Singapore ===
Turkmenistan
2
National Tennis Centre, Astana, Kazakhstan
February 6, 2013
RuKortHard Tournament F Hard (indoors)

Singapore
1

			1	2	3
1	(Turkmenistan) (Singapore)	Jahana Bayramova; Geraldine Ang	3; 6	6^{8} 7^{10}
2	(Turkmenistan) (Singapore)	Anastasiya Prenko; Rheeya Doshi	6; 1	6; 2
3	(Turkmenistan) (Singapore)	Anastasiya Prenko / Guljahan Kadyrova; Geraldine Ang / Rheeya Doshi	6; 3	4; 6	6; 2

=== New Zealand vs. Turkmenistan ===
New Zealand
3
National Tennis Centre, Astana, Kazakhstan
February 7, 2013
RuKortHard Tournament F Hard (indoors)

Turkmenistan
0

			1	2	3
1	(New Zealand) (Turkmenistan)	Emma Hayman; Guljahan Kadyrova	6; 0	6; 0
2	(New Zealand) (Turkmenistan)	Emily Fanning; Jahana Bayramova	6; 0	6; 0
3	(New Zealand) (Turkmenistan)	Abigail Guthrie / Emma Hayman; Jenneta Halliyeva / Anastasiya Prenko	6; 4	6; 1

=== Hong Kong vs. Vietnam ===
Hong Kong
3
National Tennis Centre, Astana, Kazakhstan
February 7, 2013
RuKortHard Tournament F Hard (indoors)

Vietnam
0

			1	2	3
1	(Hong Kong) (Vietnam)	Katherine Ip; Trần Thị Tâm Hảo	6; 2	6; 1
2	(Hong Kong) (Vietnam)	Venise Chan; Huỳnh Phương Đài Trang	6; 2	6; 4
3	(Hong Kong) (Vietnam)	Eudice Chong / Katherine Ip; Huỳnh Phương Đài Trang / Nguyễn Ái Ngọc Vân	6; 0	6; 1

=== New Zealand vs. Singapore ===
New Zealand
3
National Tennis Centre, Astana, Kazakhstan
February 8, 2013
RuKortHard Tournament F Hard (indoors)

Singapore
0

			1	2	3
1	(New Zealand) (Singapore)	Emma Hayman; Wee Khee-yen	6; 0	6; 1
2	(New Zealand) (Singapore)	Emily Fanning; Rheeya Doshi	6; 1	6; 0
3	(New Zealand) (Singapore)	Abigail Guthrie / Emma Hayman; Geraldine Ang / Rehmat Johal	6; 0	6; 1

=== Turkmenistan vs. Vietnam ===
Turkmenistan
0
National Tennis Centre, Astana, Kazakhstan
February 8, 2013
RuKortHard Tournament F Hard (indoors)

Vietnam
3

			1	2	3
1	(Turkmenistan) (Vietnam)	Jahana Bayramova; Trần Thị Tâm Hảo	4; 6	3; 6
2	(Turkmenistan) (Vietnam)	Anastasiya Prenko; Huỳnh Phương Đài Trang	5; 7	4; 6
3	(Turkmenistan) (Vietnam)	Jenneta Halliyeva / Anastasiya Prenko; Huỳnh Phương Đài Trang / Nguyễn Ái Ngọc Vân	2; 6	6; 2	2; 6
