= 2017 Fed Cup Asia/Oceania Zone Group II – play-offs =

Subsection of tennis competition

The play-offs of the 2017 Fed Cup Asia/Oceania Zone Group II were the final stages of the Group II Zonal Competition involving teams from Asia and Oceania. Using the positions determined in their pools, the thirteen teams faced off to determine their placing in the 2017 Fed Cup Asia/Oceania Zone Group II. The top team advanced to Asia/Oceania Group I in 2018.

== Pool results ==
Placing	Pool A	Pool B	Pool C	Pool D
1	Uzbekistan	Hong Kong	Malaysia	Indonesia
2	New Zealand	Pacific Oceania	Singapore	Sri Lanka
3	Turkmenistan	Iran	Pakistan	Tajikistan
4	—N/a			Kyrgyzstan

== 1st to 4th play-offs ==
The first placed teams of the pools were drawn in head-to-head rounds.

=== Uzbekistan vs. Indonesia ===
Uzbekistan
2
Pamir Stadium, Dushanbe, Tajikistan
21 July 2017
Hard

Indonesia
1

			1	2	3
1	(Uzbekistan) (Indonesia)	Nigina Abduraimova; Lavinia Tananta	4; 6	3; 6
2	(Uzbekistan) (Indonesia)	Sabina Sharipova; Beatrice Gumulya	6; 4	6; 1
3	(Uzbekistan) (Indonesia)	Nigina Abduraimova / Akgul Amanmuradova; Jessy Rompies / Aldila Sutjiadi	6; 4	6; 2

=== Hong Kong vs. Malaysia ===
Hong Kong
3
Pamir Stadium, Dushanbe, Tajikistan
21 July 2017
Hard

Malaysia
0

			1	2	3
1	(Hong Kong) (Malaysia)	Eudice Chong; Aslina Chua	6; 1	6; 0
2	(Hong Kong) (Malaysia)	Zhang Ling; Theiviya Selvarajoo	6; 0	6; 1
3	(Hong Kong) (Malaysia)	Katherine Ip / Ng Kwan-yau; Aslina Chua / Uma Nayar	6; 3	6; 3

== Promotion play-off ==
The winners of the 1st to 4th play-offs then played against each other for promotion. The winner advanced to the Asia/Oceania Group I in 2018.

=== Uzbekistan vs. Hong Kong ===
Uzbekistan
1
Pamir Stadium, Dushanbe, Tajikistan
22 July 2017
Hard

Hong Kong
2

			1	2	3
1	(Uzbekistan) (Hong Kong)	Akgul Amanmuradova; Eudice Chong	6; 2	6; 4
2	(Uzbekistan) (Hong Kong)	Sabina Sharipova; Zhang Ling	4; 6	1; 6
3	(Uzbekistan) (Hong Kong)	Nigina Abduraimova / Akgul Amanmuradova; Eudice Chong / Katherine Ip	7^{7} 6^{1}	3; 6	3; 6

== 5th to 8th play-offs ==
The second placed teams of the pools were drawn in head-to-head rounds to find the fifth to eighth placed teams.

=== New Zealand vs. Sri Lanka ===
New Zealand
2
Pamir Stadium, Dushanbe, Tajikistan
21 July 2017
Hard

Sri Lanka
0

			1	2	3
1	(New Zealand) (Sri Lanka)	Paige Mary Hourigan; Roshenka Fernando	6; 0	6; 1
2	(New Zealand) (Sri Lanka)	Erin Routliffe; Nethmi Himashi Waduge	6; 2	6; 0
3	(New Zealand) (Sri Lanka)	Paige Mary Hourigan / Erin Routliffe; Medhira Samarasinghe / Nethmi Himashi Waduge				not played

=== Pacific Oceania vs. Singapore ===
Pacific Oceania
3
Pamir Stadium, Dushanbe, Tajikistan
21 July 2017
Hard

Singapore
0

			1	2	3
1	(Pacific Oceania) (Singapore)	Carol Young Suh Lee; Lynelle En Tong Lim	6; 0	6; 4
2	(Pacific Oceania) (Singapore)	Abigail Tere-Apisah; Y-kit Nicole Tan	6^{5} 7^{7}	6; 0	6; 0
3	(Pacific Oceania) (Singapore)	Carol Young Suh Lee / Mayka Zima; Angela Shan Min Lim / Charmaine Shi Yi Seah	6; 1	5; 7	6; 0

== 9th to 12th play-offs ==
The third placed teams of the pools were drawn in a head-to-head round to find the ninth to twelfth placed teams.

=== Turkmenistan vs. Tajikistan ===
Turkmenistan
0
Pamir Stadium, Dushanbe, Tajikistan
21 July 2017
Hard

Tajikistan
2

			1	2	3
1	(Turkmenistan) (Tajikistan)	Jahana Bayramova; Takhmina Burkhanova	3; 6	0; 6
2	(Turkmenistan) (Tajikistan)	Guljan Mammetkuliyeva; Anastasiya Tursunova	0; 6	4; 6
3	(Turkmenistan) (Tajikistan)	Jahana Bayramova / Guljan Mammetkuliyeva; Kamila Mulloeva / Nargizakhon Yakhyaeva				not played

=== Iran vs. Pakistan ===
Iran
2
Pamir Stadium, Dushanbe, Tajikistan
21 July 2017
Hard

Pakistan
1

			1	2	3
1	(Iran) (Pakistan)	Sadaf Sadeghvaziri; Mahin Qureshi	6; 4	6; 2
2	(Iran) (Pakistan)	Ghazal Pakbaten; Ushna Suhail	6; 4	6; 2
3	(Iran) (Pakistan)	Sara Amiri / Ghazal Pakbaten; Sarah Mahboob Khan / Ushna Suhail	3; 6	5; 7

== Final placements ==
Placing	Teams	
Promoted	Hong Kong	
Second	Uzbekistan	
Third	Indonesia	Malaysia
Fifth	New Zealand	Pacific Oceania
Seventh	Sri Lanka	Singapore
Ninth	Tajikistan	Iran
Eleventh	Turkmenistan	Pakistan
Thirteenth	Kyrgyzstan	

- Hong Kong advanced to Asia/Oceania Zone Group I in 2018.

== See also ==
- Fed Cup structure
