= 2017 Fed Cup Asia/Oceania Zone =

Subsection of tennis competition

The Asia/Oceania Zone was one of three zones of regional competition in the 2017 Fed Cup.

== Group I ==
- Venue: Daulet National Tennis Centre, Astana, Kazakhstan (indoor hard)
- Date: 8–11 February

The seven teams were divided into two pools of three and four teams. The two pool winners took part in a play-off to determine the nation advancing to the World Group II play-offs. The nations finishing last in their pools took part in a relegation play-off, with the losing nation being relegated to Group II for 2018.

Seeding: The seeding was based on the Fed Cup Rankings of 14 November 2016 (shown in parentheses below).

Pot 1	Pot 2	Pot 3
1. Thailand (25); 2. China (26)	3. Kazakhstan (27); 4. Japan (28)	5. India (35); 6. Philippines (37); 7. South Korea (40)

=== Pools ===
	Pool A	KAZ	KOR	THA
1	Kazakhstan (2–0)		2–1	3–0
2	South Korea (1–1)	1–2		3–0
3	Thailand (0–2)	0–3	0–3	

	Pool B	JPN	CHN	IND	PHI
1	Japan (3–0)		3–0	3–0	3–0
2	China (2–1)	0–3		3–0	3–0
3	India (1–2)	0–3	0–3		2–1
4	Philippines (0–3)	0–3	0–3	1–2	

=== Play-offs ===
Placing	A Team	Score	B Team
Promotional	Kazakhstan	2–1	Japan
3rd–4th	South Korea	0–2	China
5th	—		India
Relegation	Thailand	2–0	Philippines

=== Final placements ===
Placing	Team
Promoted/First	Kazakhstan
Second	Japan
Third	China
Fourth	South Korea
Fifth	India
Sixth	Thailand
Relegated/Seventh	Philippines

- Kazakhstan was promoted to the 2017 Fed Cup World Group II Play-offs.
- Philippines was relegated to Asia/Oceania Zone Group II in 2018.

== Group II ==
- Venue: Pamir Stadium, Dushanbe, Tajikistan (outdoor hard)
- Date: 18–23 July

The thirteen teams were divided into three pools of three teams and one pool of four teams. The four pool winners took part in a play-off to determine the nation advancing to Group I in 2018.

Seeding: The seeding was based on the Fed Cup Rankings of 24 April 2017 (shown in parentheses below).

Pot 1	Pot 2	Pot 3
1. Uzbekistan (50); 2. Hong Kong (57); 3. Singapore (60); 4. Indonesia (61)	5. Malaysia (63); 6. Turkmenistan (69); 7. Pacific Oceania (71); 8. Sri Lanka (76)	9. Iran (78); 10. Pakistan (79); 11. Kyrgyzstan (85); 12. New Zealand (87); 13. Tajikistan (-)

=== Pools ===
	Pool A	UZB	NZL	TKM
1	Uzbekistan (2–0)		3–0	3–0
2	New Zealand (1–1)	0–3		3–0
3	Turkmenistan (0–2)	0–3	0–3	

	Pool B	HKG	POC	IRI
1	Hong Kong (2–0)		3–0	3–0
2	Pacific Oceania (1–1)	0–3		3–0
3	Iran (0–2)	0–3	0–3	

	Pool C	MAS	SGP	PAK
1	Malaysia (2–0)		3–0	3–0
2	Singapore (1–1)	0–3		3–0
3	Pakistan (0–2)	0–3	0–3	

	Pool D	INA	SRI	TJK	KGZ
1	Indonesia (3–0)		3–0	3–0	3–0
2	Sri Lanka (2–1)	0–3		2–1	3–0
3	Tajikistan (1–2)	0–3	1–2		2–1
4	Kyrgyzstan (0–3)	0–3	0–3	1–2	

=== Play-offs ===
==== 1st to 4th playoffs ====
Semifinals; 21 July
A	Uzbekistan	2
D	Indonesia	1
B	Hong Kong	3
C	Malaysia	0

Final; 22 July
A	Uzbekistan	1
B	Hong Kong	2

==== 5th to 13th playoffs ====
Placing	A Team	Score	D Team
5th–8th	New Zealand	2–0	Sri Lanka
9th–12th	Turkmenistan	0–2	Tajikistan
13th	—		Kyrgyzstan

Placing	B Team	Score	C Team
5th–8th	Pacific Oceania	3–0	Singapore
9th–12th	Iran	2–1	Pakistan

=== Final placements ===
Placing	Teams	
Promoted	Hong Kong	
Second	Uzbekistan	
Third	Indonesia	Malaysia
Fifth	New Zealand	Pacific Oceania
Seventh	Sri Lanka	Singapore
Ninth	Tajikistan	Iran
Eleventh	Turkmenistan	Pakistan
Thirteenth	Kyrgyzstan	

- Hong Kong advanced to Asia/Oceania Zone Group I in 2018.
