= Rheeya Doshi =

Singaporean tennis player

- Country (sports): Singapore
- Born: 24 April 1996 (age 29) Singapore
- Plays: Right-handed (two-handed backhand)
- Prize money: $0

Rheeya Doshi (Tamil: ரியா தோஷி; born 24 April 1996) is a female former tennis player from Singapore.

Doshi attended Northwestern University from 2014 to 2019, having signed with the Wildcats tennis team in 2013.

Representing Northwestern, Doshi holds a win/loss record of 63–52 in singles and 80–44 in doubles.

== Fed Cup participation ==
=== Singles ===
Edition	Stage	Date	Location	Against	Surface	Opponent	W/L	Score
2013 Fed Cup; Asia/Oceania Zone Group II	R/R	4 February 2013	Astana, Kazakhstan	(Vietnam) Vietnam	Hard (i)	(Vietnam) Huỳnh Phương Đài Trang	L	3–6, 0–6
2013 Fed Cup; Asia/Oceania Zone Group II	R/R	5 February 2013	Astana, Kazakhstan	Hong Kong	Hard (i)	(Hong Kong) Katherine Ip	L	3–6, 0–6
2013 Fed Cup; Asia/Oceania Zone Group II	R/R	6 February 2013	Astana, Kazakhstan	Turkmenistan	Hard (i)	(Turkmenistan) Anastasiya Prenko	L	1–6, 2–6
2013 Fed Cup; Asia/Oceania Zone Group II	R/R	8 February 2013	Astana, Kazakhstan	New Zealand	Hard (i)	(New Zealand) Emily Fanning	L	1–6, 0–6
2013 Fed Cup; Asia/Oceania Zone Group II	P/O	9 February 2013	Astana, Kazakhstan	Pakistan	Hard (i)	(Pakistan) Ushna Suhail	W	6–2, 4–6, 6–4
2014 Fed Cup; Asia/Oceania Zone Group II	R/R	4 February 2014	Astana, Kazakhstan	(Philippines) Philippines	Hard (i)	(Philippines) Marian Capadocia	L	4–6, 1–6
2014 Fed Cup; Asia/Oceania Zone Group II	R/R	5 February 2014	Astana, Kazakhstan	Sri Lanka	Hard (i)	(Sri Lanka) Amreetha Muttiah	W	6–1, 6–3
2014 Fed Cup; Asia/Oceania Zone Group II	P/O	7 February 2014	Astana, Kazakhstan	Kyrgyzstan	Hard (i)	(Kyrgyzstan) Alina Lazareva	W	6–1, 6–1

=== Doubles ===
Edition	Stage	Date	Location	Against	Surface	Partner	Opponents	W/L	Score
2013 Fed Cup; Asia/Oceania Zone Group II	R/R	4 February 2013	Astana, Kazakhstan	Vietnam	Hard (i)	(Singapore) Wee Khee-yen	(Vietnam) Nguyễn Ái Ngọc Vân (Vietnam) Phi Khánh Huỳnh	L	1–6, 3–6
2013 Fed Cup; Asia/Oceania Zone Group II	R/R	6 February 2013	Astana, Kazakhstan	Turkmenistan	Hard (i)	(Singapore) Geraldine Ang	(Turkmenistan) Anastasiya Prenko (Turkmenistan) Guljahan Kadyrova	L	3–6, 6–4, 2–6
2014 Fed Cup; Asia/Oceania Zone Group II	P/O	7 February 2014	Astana, Kazakhstan	Kyrgyzstan	Hard (i)	(Singapore) Geraldine Ang	(Kyrgyzstan) Alina Lazareva (Kyrgyzstan) Inna Volkovich	W	6–1, 6–2
