= Emma Hayman =

New Zealand tennis player

- Country (sports): New Zealand
- Born: 24 February 1988 (age 38) Durban, South Africa
- Prize money: $8,132

Singles
- Career record: 29–24
- Career titles: 0
- Highest ranking: 686 (4 November 2013)

Doubles
- Career record: 21–30
- Career titles: 1 ITF
- Highest ranking: 751 (7 July 2014)

Team competitions
- Fed Cup: 8–1

Emma Hayman (born 24 February 1988) is a New Zealand tennis player.

Hayman has won one doubles title on the ITF tour in her career. On 4 November 2013, she reached her best singles ranking of world number 686. On 7 July 2014, she peaked at world number 751 in the doubles rankings.

Hayman made her WTA tour debut at the 2013 ASB Classic.

Playing for New Zealand at the Fed Cup, Hayman has a win–loss record of 8–1.

== ITF finals (1–0) ==
=== Doubles (1–0) ===
Legend $100,000 tournaments $75,000 tournaments $50,000 tournaments $25,000 tournaments $15,000 tournaments $10,000 tournaments	Finals by surface Hard (0–0) Clay (1–0) Grass (0–0) Carpet (0–0)

Outcome	No.	Date	Tournament	Surface	Partner	Opponents	Score
Winner	1.	23 July 2012	Horb am Neckar, Germany	Clay	(Netherlands) Jade Schoelink	(Germany) Carolin Daniels (Germany) Dejana Raickovic	2–6, 6–3, [10–8]

== Fed Cup participation ==
=== Singles ===
Edition	Stage	Date	Location	Against	Surface	Opponent	W/L	Score
2013 Fed Cup; Asia/Oceania Zone Group II	R/R	6 February 2013	Astana, Kazakhstan	Hong Kong	Hard (i)	(Hong Kong) Katherine Ip	L	2–6, 2–6
2013 Fed Cup; Asia/Oceania Zone Group II	R/R	7 February 2013	Astana, Kazakhstan	Turkmenistan	Hard (i)	(Turkmenistan) Guljahan Kadyrova	W	6–0, 6–0
2014 Fed Cup; Asia/Oceania Zone Group II	R/R	5 February 2014	Astana, Kazakhstan	Iran	Hard (i)	(Iran) Sahar Amini Hajibashi	W	6–1, 6–2
2014 Fed Cup; Asia/Oceania Zone Group II	P/O	7 February 2014	Astana, Kazakhstan	Malaysia	Hard (i)	(Malaysia) Aslina Chua	W	6–2, 6–3

=== Doubles ===
Edition	Stage	Date	Location	Against	Surface	Partner	Opponents	W/L	Score
2013 Fed Cup; Asia/Oceania Zone Group II	R/R	5 February 2013	Astana, Kazakhstan	Vietnam	Hard (i)	(New Zealand) Abigail Guthrie	(Vietnam) Huỳnh Phương Đài Trang (Vietnam) Trần Thị Tâm Hảo	W	4–6, 6–3, 6–4
2013 Fed Cup; Asia/Oceania Zone Group II	R/R	6 February 2013	Astana, Kazakhstan	Hong Kong	Hard (i)	(New Zealand) Abigail Guthrie	(Hong Kong) Venise Chan (Hong Kong) Katherine Ip	W	7–6^{(7–5)}, 6–4
2013 Fed Cup; Asia/Oceania Zone Group II	R/R	7 February 2013	Astana, Kazakhstan	Turkmenistan	Hard (i)	(New Zealand) Abigail Guthrie	(Turkmenistan) Jenneta Halliyeva (Turkmenistan) Anastasiya Prenko	W	6–4, 6–1
2013 Fed Cup; Asia/Oceania Zone Group II	R/R	8 February 2013	Astana, Kazakhstan	Singapore	Hard (i)	(New Zealand) Abigail Guthrie	(Singapore) Geraldine Ang (Singapore) Rehmat Johal	W	6–0, 6–1
2014 Fed Cup; Asia/Oceania Zone Group II	R/R	4 February 2014	Astana, Kazakhstan	Pakistan	Hard (i)	(New Zealand) Abigail Guthrie	(Pakistan) Maheen Dada (Pakistan) Rida Khalid	W	6–0, 6–1
