= Ng Kwan-yau =

Hong Kong tennis player

Ng Kwan-yau 吳筠柔
- Country (sports): Hong Kong
- Born: 19 February 1997 (age 29)
- Plays: Right-handed (two-handed backhand)
- Prize money: US$ 39,507

Singles
- Career record: 48–135
- Career titles: 0
- Highest ranking: No. 724 (10 June 2019)

Doubles
- Career record: 60–104
- Career titles: 1 ITF
- Highest ranking: No. 452 (17 February 2020)
- Current ranking: No. 570 (5 December 2022)

Team competitions
- Fed Cup: 6–5
- Last updated on: 16 May 2022.

Ng Kwan-yau (Chinese: 吳筠柔; Jyutping: Ng4 Gwan1jau4; Cantonese pronunciation: [ŋ̭̍ kʷɐ́n jɐ̏u] born 19 February 1997) is a Hong Kong female tennis player.

== Career ==
As a professional tennis player, she has a career-high doubles ranking by the Women's Tennis Association (WTA) of 452, achieved February 2020.

Playing for Hong Kong Fed Cup team, she has a career win–loss record of 6–5.

Ng made her WTA Tour main-draw debut at the 2016 Guangzhou International Open, where she lost to Sabine Lisicki in the first round.

== ITF Circuit finals ==
=== Doubles (1–1) ===
Legend
$50,000 tournaments
$25,000 tournaments
$10,000 tournaments

Result	W–L	Date	Tournament	Surface	Partner	Opponents	Score
Win	1-0	15 July 2018	ITF Hong Kong	Hard	(Hong Kong) Wu Ho Ching	(India) Zeel Desai (Japan) Akari Inoue	6–4, 6–4
Loss	1-1	17 November 2019	ITF Hua Hin, Thailand	Hard	(China) Zheng Saisai	(Netherlands) Lesley Pattinama Kerkhove (Thailand) Tamarine Tanasugarn	2–6, 6–7^{(5)}

== Fed Cup participation ==
=== Doubles (6–4) ===
Edition	Stage	Date	Location	Against	Surface	Partner	Opponents	W/L	Score
2014 Fed Cup; Asia/Oceania Zone Group II	R/R	6 February 2014	Astana, Kazakhstan	Malaysia	Hard	(Hong Kong) Wu Ho-ching	(Malaysia) Yus Syazlin Nabila Binti Yusri (Malaysia) Michelle Li Sha Khoo	W	6–1, 6–2
2014 Fed Cup; Asia/Oceania Zone Group II	P/O	7 February 2014	Astana, Kazakhstan	India	Hard	(Hong Kong) Wu Ho-ching	(India) Ankita Raina (India) Rishika Sunkara	L	2–6, 1–6
2014 Fed Cup; Asia/Oceania Zone Group II	P/O	8 February 2014	Astana, Kazakhstan	Philippines	Hard	(Hong Kong) Wu Ho-ching	(Philippines) Marian Jade Capadocia (Philippines) Anna Clarice Patrimonio	L	5–7, 3–6
2017 Fed Cup; Asia/Oceania Zone Group II	R/R	18 July 2017	Dushanbe, Tajikistan	Iran	Hard	(Hong Kong) Katherine Ip	(Iran) Sara Amiri (Iran) Yasmin Mansouri	W	6–1, 6–3
2017 Fed Cup; Asia/Oceania Zone Group II	R/R	20 July 2017	Dushanbe, Tajikistan	Pacific Oceania	Hard	(Hong Kong) Katherine Ip	(Northern Mariana Islands) Carol Young Suh Lee (New Caledonia) Mayka Zima	W	6–4, 6–4
2017 Fed Cup; Asia/Oceania Zone Group II	P/O	21 July 2017	Dushanbe, Tajikistan	Malaysia	Hard	(Hong Kong) Katherine Ip	(Malaysia) Aslina Chua (Malaysia) Uma Nayar	W	6–3, 6–3
2018 Fed Cup; Asia/Oceania Zone Group I	R/R	9 February 2018	New Delhi, India	India	Hard	(Hong Kong) Wu Ho-ching	(India) Prarthana Thombare (India) Pranjala Yadlapalli	L	2–6, 4–6
2019 Fed Cup; Asia/Oceania Zone Group II	R/R	19 July 2019	Kuala Lumpur, Malaysia	Pakistan	Hard	(Hong Kong) Hong Yi Cody Wong	(Pakistan) Meheq Khokhar (Pakistan) Sarah Mahboob Khan	W	6–0, 6–1
2019 Fed Cup; Asia/Oceania Zone Group II	R/R	20 July 2019	Kuala Lumpur, Malaysia	Bangladesh	Hard	(Hong Kong) Hong Yi Cody Wong	(Bangladesh) Eshita Afrose (Bangladesh) Jarin Sultana Jolly	W	6–2, 6–1
2019 Fed Cup; Asia/Oceania Zone Group II	R/R	21 July 2019	Kuala Lumpur, Malaysia	New Zealand	Hard	(Hong Kong) Wu Ho-ching	(New Zealand) Valentina Ivanov (New Zealand) Erin Routliffe	L	2–6, 2–6
