= 2014 Fed Cup Asia/Oceania Zone =

Subsection of tennis competition

The Asia/Oceania Zone was one of three zones of regional competition in the 2014 Fed Cup.

== Group I ==
- Venue: National Tennis Centre, Astana, Kazakhstan (indoor hard)
- Dates: 5–8 February

The seven teams were divided into one pool of three and one pool of four teams. The two pool winners took part in play-offs to determine the nation advancing to the World Group II play-offs. The nations finishing last in their pools took part in relegation play-offs, with the losing nation being relegated to Group II for 2015.

=== Pools ===
	Pool A	KAZ	INA	THA
1	Kazakhstan (1–1)		3–0	1–2
2	Indonesia (0–2)	0–3		0–3
3	Thailand (2–0)	2–1	3–0	

	Pool B	CHN	UZB	KOR	TPE
1	China (2–1)		1–2	3–0	3–0
2	Uzbekistan (3–0)	2–1		2–0	3–0
3	South Korea (1–2)	0–3	0–2		3–0
4	Chinese Taipei (0–3)	0–3	0–3	0–3	

=== Play-offs ===
Placing	A Team	Score	B Team
Promotion	Thailand	2–1	Uzbekistan
3rd–4th	Kazakhstan	2–0	China
5th	N/A	-	South Korea
Relegation	Indonesia	0–2	Chinese Taipei

- Thailand was promoted to World Group II play-offs
- Indonesia was relegated to Asia/Oceania Zone Group II

== Group II ==
- Venue: National Tennis Centre, Astana, Kazakhstan (indoor hard)
- Dates: 4–8 February

The thirteen teams were divided into one pool of four and three pools of three teams. The winners of each pool played off against each other to determine which one team advanced to Asia/Oceania Zone Group I in 2014. All the other nations competed in the same manner for the positional play-offs.

=== Pools ===
	Pool A	HKG	MAS	VIE
1	Hong Kong (2–0)		3–0	3–0
2	Malaysia (1–1)	0–3		2–1
3	Vietnam (0–2)	0–3	1–2	

	Pool B	PHI	SIN	SRI
1	Philippines (2–0)		3–0	3–0
2	Singapore (1–1)	0–3		2–1
3	Sri Lanka (0–2)	0–3	1–2	

	Pool C	TKM	KGZ	IRQ
1	Turkmenistan (2–0)		3–0	2–1
2	Kyrgyzstan (1–1)	0–3		2–1
3	Iraq (0–2)	1–2	1–2	

	Pool D	IND	IRI	NZL	PAK
1	India (3–0)		3–0	2–1	3–0
2	Iran (1–2)	0–3		0–3	2–1
3	New Zealand (2–1)	1–2	3–0		3–0
4	Pakistan (0–3)	0–3	1–2	0–3	

=== Play-offs ===
==== 1st to 4th playoffs ====
Semifinals; 7 February
A	Hong Kong	2
D	India	1
B	Philippines	3
C	Turkmenistan	0

Final; 8 February
A	Hong Kong	2
B	Philippines	1

==== 5th to 13th playoff ====
Placing	A Team	Score	D Team
5th–8th	Malaysia	0–3	New Zealand
9th–12th	Vietnam	3–0	Iran
13th	—		Pakistan

Placing	B Team	Score	C Team
5th–8th	Singapore	2–1	Kyrgyzstan
9th–12th	Sri Lanka	3–0	Iraq

=== Final placements ===
Placing	Teams	
Promoted	Hong Kong	
Second	Philippines	
Third	Turkmenistan	India
Fifth	New Zealand	Singapore
Seventh	Kyrgyzstan	Malaysia
Ninth	Vietnam	Sri Lanka
Eleventh	Iran	Iraq
Thirteenth	Pakistan	

- Hong Kong advanced to Asia/Oceania Zone Group I.
