= 2012 Fed Cup Asia/Oceania Zone Group II – Pool B =

Tennis tournament

Group B of the 2012 Fed Cup Asia/Oceania Zone Group II was one of two pools in the Asia/Oceania zone of the 2012 Fed Cup. Five teams competed in a round robin competition, with the teams proceeding to their respective sections of the play-offs: the top team played for advancement to the 2013 Group I.

		(Philippines) PHI	(India) IND	(Turkmenistan) TKM	(Oman) OMA	(Iran) IRI	RR; W–L	Set; W–L	Game; W–L	Standings
59	Philippines		1–2	2–1	2–1	3–0	3–1	18–9	131–69	2
61	India	2–1		3–0	3–0	3–0	4–0	21–3	114–45	1
74	Turkmenistan	1–2	0–3		2–1	3–0	2–2	12–14	91–103	3
82	Oman	1–2	0–3	0–3		2–1	1–3	10–15	85–111	4
91	Iran	0–3	0–3	0–3	1–2		0–4	2–22	24–137	5

== India vs. Iran ==
India
3
Shenzhen Luohu Tennis Centre, Shenzhen, China
January 30, 2012
Hard (outdoors)

Iran
0

			1	2	3
1	(India) (Iran)	Rutuja Bhosale; Madona Najarian	6; 0	6; 0
2	(India) (Iran)	Prerna Bhambri; Ghazaleh Torkaman	6; 0	6; 1
3	(India) (Iran)	Rutuja Bhosale / Isha Lakhani; Madona Najarian / Ghazaleh Torkaman	6; 1	6; 0

== Turkmenistan vs. Oman ==
Turkmenistan
2
Shenzhen Luohu Tennis Centre, Shenzhen, China
January 30, 2012
Hard (outdoors)

Oman
1

			1	2	3
1	(Turkmenistan) (Oman)	Jenneta Halliyeva; Sarah Al Balushi	6; 2	6; 1
2	(Turkmenistan) (Oman)	Anastasiya Prenko; Fatma Al Nabhani	2; 6	2; 6
3	(Turkmenistan) (Oman)	Jenneta Halliyeva / Anastasiya Prenko; Sarah Al Balushi / Fatma Al Nabhani	5; 7	6; 1	6; 1

== Philippines vs. Iran ==
Philippines
3
Shenzhen Luohu Tennis Centre, Shenzhen, China
January 31, 2012
Hard (outdoors)

Iran
0

			1	2	3
1	(Philippines) (Iran)	Maika Jae Tanpoco; Sahar Najaei	6; 0	6; 0
2	(Philippines) (Iran)	Marian Jade Capadocia; Seyedeh Saadat	6; 0	6; 0
3	(Philippines) (Iran)	Tamitha Nguyen / Anna Clarice Patrimonio; Madona Najarian / Ghazaleh Torkaman	6; 0	6; 1

== India vs. Oman ==
India
3
Shenzhen Luohu Tennis Centre, Shenzhen, China
January 31, 2012
Hard (outdoors)

Oman
0

			1	2	3
1	(India) (Oman)	Rutuja Bhosale; Maliha Al Awaidy	6; 1	6; 0
2	(India) (Oman)	Rutuja Bhosale; Fatma Al Nabhani	1; 6	7; 5	6; 4
3	(India) (Oman)	Prerna Bhambri / Isha Lakhani; Sarah Al Balushi / Maliha Al Awaidy				w/o

== Philippines vs. Oman ==
Philippines
2
Shenzhen Luohu Tennis Centre, Shenzhen, China
February 1, 2012
Hard (outdoors)

Oman
1

			1	2	3
1	(Philippines) (Oman)	Tamitha Nguyen; Maliha Al Awaidy	6; 0	6; 0
2	(Philippines) (Oman)	Anna Clarice Patrimonio; Fatma Al Nabhani	6; 1	4; 6	3; 6
3	(Philippines) (Oman)	Marian Jade Capadocia / Anna Clarice Patrimonio; Fatma Al Nabhani / Maliha Al Awaidy	6; 0	6; 3

== India vs. Turkmenistan ==
India
3
Shenzhen Luohu Tennis Centre, Shenzhen, China
February 1, 2012
Hard (outdoors)

Turkmenistan
0

			1	2	3
1	(India) (Turkmenistan)	Rutuja Bhosale; Ummarahmat Hummetova	6; 2	6; 0
2	(India) (Turkmenistan)	Prerna Bhambri; Anastasiya Prenko	6; 1	6; 3
3	(India) (Turkmenistan)	Prerna Bhambri / Isha Lakhani; Jenneta Halliyeva / Guljan Muhammetkuliyeva	6; 0	6; 0

== Philippines vs. Turkmenistan ==
Philippines
2
Shenzhen Luohu Tennis Centre, Shenzhen, China
February 2, 2012
Hard (outdoors)

Turkmenistan
1

			1	2	3
1	(Philippines) (Turkmenistan)	Tamitha Nguyen; Ummarahmat Hummetova	6; 0	6; 0
2	(Philippines) (Turkmenistan)	Anna Clarice Patrimonio; Anastasiya Prenko	5; 7	6; 1	2; 6
3	(Philippines) (Turkmenistan)	Tamitha Nguyen / Anna Clarice Patrimonio; Jenneta Halliyeva / Anastasiya Prenko	6; 1	6; 1

== Oman vs. Iran ==
Oman
2
Shenzhen Luohu Tennis Centre, Shenzhen, China
February 2, 2012
Hard (outdoors)

Iran
1

			1	2	3
1	(Oman) (Iran)	Maliha Al Awaidy; Madona Najarian	5; 7	2; 6
2	(Oman) (Iran)	Fatma Al Nabhani; Ghazaleh Torkaman	6; 1	6; 0
3	(Oman) (Iran)	Sarah Al Balushi / Fatma Al Nabhani; Madona Najarian / Ghazaleh Torkaman	6; 0	6; 1

== Philippines vs. India ==
Philippines
1
Shenzhen Luohu Tennis Centre, Shenzhen, China
February 3, 2012
Hard (outdoors)

India
2

			1	2	3
1	(Philippines) (India)	Tamitha Nguyen; Rutuja Bhosale	2; 6	3; 6
2	(Philippines) (India)	Anna Clarice Patrimonio; Prerna Bhambri	3; 6	6; 4	6; 2
3	(Philippines) (India)	Tamitha Nguyen / Anna Clarice Patrimonio; Isha Lakhani / Sania Mirza	0; 6	1; 6

== Turkmenistan vs. Iran ==
Turkmenistan
3
Shenzhen Luohu Tennis Centre, Shenzhen, China
February 3, 2012
Hard (outdoors)

Iran
0

			1	2	3
1	(Turkmenistan) (Iran)	Jenneta Halliyeva; Seyedeh Saadat	6; 2	6; 0
2	(Turkmenistan) (Iran)	Anastasiya Prenko; Ghazaleh Torkaman	6; 2	6; 2
3	(Turkmenistan) (Iran)	Ummarahmat Hummetova / Anastasiya Prenko; Sahar Najaei / Madona Najarian	6; 0	6; 0
