= Huỳnh Phương Đài Trang =

Vietnamese tennis player (born 1993)

Huỳnh Trang
- Full name: Huỳnh Phương Đài Trang
- Country (sports): Vietnam
- Residence: Ho Chi Minh City, Vietnam
- Born: 1 August 1993 (age 32) Bà Rịa–Vũng Tàu, Vietnam
- Height: 165 cm (5 ft 5 in)
- Retired: March 2015
- Plays: Right-handed (two-handed backhand)
- Prize money: $15,810

Singles
- Career record: 31–64
- Career titles: 0
- Highest ranking: No. 876 (12 April 2010)

Doubles
- Career record: 56–63
- Career titles: 3 ITF
- Highest ranking: No. 380 (23 July 2012)

Team competitions
- Fed Cup: 4–3
Medal record
Women's Tennis
Representing Vietnam
Southeast Asian Games
Bronze medal – third place	2011 Jakarta-Palembang	Doubles
Bronze medal – third place	2011 Jakarta-Palembang	Team

Huỳnh Phương Đài Trang (born 1 August 1993) is a Vietnamese former tennis player.

Trang has career-high WTA rankings of 876 in singles, reached in April 2010, and 380 in doubles, achieved on 23 July 2012. In her career, she won three $10k doubles titles on the ITF Women's Circuit and reached another two $25k doubles finals.

Playing for Vietnam Fed Cup team, Trang has a win–loss record of 4–3.

She made her WTA Tour main-draw debut at the 2010 Malaysian Open, where she was given a wildcard into the doubles event with Jawairiah Noordin of Malaysia. The pair lost in the first round to Vitalia Diatchenko and Chanelle Scheepers, 4–6, 2–6.

Trang has participated for Vietnam at the Asian Games and the Southeast Asian Games. At the 2011 Southeast Asian Games she won two bronze medals, in the doubles and the team events.

== ITF finals ==
=== Doubles: 7 (3–4) ===
Legend $100,000 tournaments $75,000 tournaments $50,000 tournaments $25,000 tournaments $10,000 tournaments	Finals by surface Hard (1–3) Clay (2–0) Grass (0–0) Carpet (0–1)

Result	No.	Date	Tournament	Surface	Partner	Opponents	Score
Loss	1.	23 October 2010	ITF Khon Kaen, Thailand	Hard	(Japan) Maya Kato	(Thailand) Luksika Kumkhum (Thailand) Varatchaya Wongteanchai	4–6, 5–7
Win	1.	7 August 2011	ITF Iława, Poland	Clay	(Poland) Magdalena Kiszczyńska	(Poland) Karolina Kosińska (Poland) Aleksandra Rosolska	2–6, 6–3, [10–7]
Win	2.	28 August 2011	ITF Braunschweig, Germany	Clay	(Denmark) Karen Barbat	(Germany) Sabrina Baumgarten (Germany) Katharina Lehnert	6–2, 6–4
Loss	2.	28 October 2011	ITF Hamanako, Japan	Carpet	(Thailand) Varatchaya Wongteanchai	(Japan) Natsumi Hamamura (Japan) Ayumi Oka	3–6, 3–6
Loss	3.	12 May 2012	ITF Tarakan, Indonesia	Hard	(South Korea) Lee So-ra	(Japan) Chiaki Okadaue (Japan) Yurika Sema	4–6, 6–7^{(4–7)}
Win	3.	7 October 2012	ITF Kalamata, Greece	Hard	(Israel) Keren Shlomo	(Germany) Stefanie Stemmer (Liechtenstein) Kathinka von Deichmann	3–6, 6–2, [12–10]
Loss	4.	14 December 2012	ITF Bangkok, Thailand	Hard	(China) Li Yihong	(China) Wang Yafan (China) Wen Xin	0–6, 3–6

== Fed Cup participation ==
=== Singles ===
Edition	Round	Date	Location	Against	Surface	Opponent	W/L	Score
2013 Fed Cup	Asia/Oceania Zone	4 February 2013	Astana, Kazakhstan	Singapore	Hard (i)	(Singapore) Rheeya Doshi	W	6–3, 6–0
2013 Fed Cup	Asia/Oceania Zone	5 February 2013	Astana, Kazakhstan	New Zealand	Hard (i)	(New Zealand) Marina Erakovic	L	0–6, 2–6
2013 Fed Cup	Asia/Oceania Zone	7 February 2013	Astana, Kazakhstan	Hong Kong	Hard (i)	(Hong Kong) Venise Chan	L	2–6, 4–6
2013 Fed Cup	Asia/Oceania Zone	8 February 2013	Astana, Kazakhstan	Turkmenistan	Hard (i)	(Turkmenistan) Anastasiya Prenko	W	7–5, 6–4
2013 Fed Cup	Asia/Oceania Zone	9 February 2013	Astana, Kazakhstan	Malaysia	Hard (i)	(Malaysia) Alyssa Boey	W	6–1, 6–0

=== Doubles ===
Edition	Round	Date	Location	Against	Surface	Partner	Opponents	W/L	Score
2013 Fed Cup	Asia/ Oceania Zone	5 February 2013	Astana, Kazakhstan	New Zealand	Hard (i)	Trần Thị Tâm Hảo	(New Zealand) Abigail Guthrie (New Zealand) Emma Hayman	L	6–4, 3–6, 4–6
2013 Fed Cup	Asia/ Oceania Zone	8 February 2013	Astana, Kazakhstan	Turkmenistan	Hard (i)	Nguyễn Ái Ngọc Vân	(Turkmenistan) Jahana Bayramova (Turkmenistan) Anastasiya Prenko	W	6–4, 2–6, 6–2
