= 2011 Fed Cup Asia/Oceania Zone Group II – Pool B =

Group B of the 2011 Fed Cup Asia/Oceania Zone Group II was one of two pools in the Asia/Oceania zone of the 2011 Fed Cup. Four teams competed in a round robin competition, with the teams proceeding to their respective sections of the play-offs: the top team played for advancement to the 2012 Group I.

		(Hong Kong) HKG	(Singapore) SIN	(Turkmenistan) TKM	(Oman) OMA	RR; W–L	Set; W–L	Game; W–L	Standings
50	Hong Kong		3–0	3–0	3–0	3–0	18–1	109–19	1
67	Singapore	0–3		2–1	2–1	2–1	8–11	67–83	2
81	Turkmenistan	0–3	1–2		3–0	1–2	8–11	64–88	3
	Oman	0–3	1–2	0–3		0–3	5–16	60–110	4

== Hong Kong vs. Turkmenistan ==
Hong Kong
3
National Tennis Centre, Nonthaburi, Thailand
February 2, 2011
Hard (outdoors)

Turkmenistan
0

			1	2	3
1	(Hong Kong) (Turkmenistan)	Katherine Ip; Amangul Mollayeva	6; 0	6; 0
2	(Hong Kong) (Turkmenistan)	Zhang Ling; Anastasiya Prenko	6; 0	6; 0
3	(Hong Kong) (Turkmenistan)	Ho Ching Wu / Zhang Ling; Jenneta Halliyeva / Anastasiya Prenko	6; 0	6; 3

== Singapore vs. Oman ==
Singapore
2
National Tennis Centre, Nonthaburi, Thailand
February 2, 2011
Hard (outdoors)

Oman
1

			1	2	3
1	(Singapore) (Oman)	Clare Fong; Maliha Al-Awaidy	6; 0	6; 2
2	(Singapore) (Oman)	Stefanie Tan; Fatma Al Nabhani	0; 6	4; 6
3	(Singapore) (Oman)	Clare Fong / Stefanie Tan; Sarah Al Balushi / Fatma Al Nabhani	3; 6	7; 5	6; 2

== Hong Kong vs. Singapore ==
Hong Kong
3
National Tennis Centre, Nonthaburi, Thailand
February 3, 2011
Hard (outdoors)

Singapore
0

			1	2	3
1	(Hong Kong) (Singapore)	Katherine Ip; Clare Fong	6; 0	6; 0
2	(Hong Kong) (Singapore)	Zhang Ling; Stefanie Tan	6; 3	6; 2
3	(Hong Kong) (Singapore)	Ho Ching Wu / Zhang Ling; Clare Fong / Khee Yen Wee	6; 0	6; 0

== Turkmenistan vs. Oman ==
Turkmenistan
3
National Tennis Centre, Nonthaburi, Thailand
February 3, 2011
Hard (outdoors)

Oman
0

			1	2	3
1	(Turkmenistan) (Oman)	Jenneta Halliyeva; Maliha Al-Awaidy	6; 1	6; 0
2	(Turkmenistan) (Oman)	Anastasiya Prenko; Fatma Al Nabhani	4; 6	7^{12} 6^{10}	6; 4
3	(Turkmenistan) (Oman)	Ayna Ereshova / Amangul Mollayeva; Sarah Al Balushi / Maliha Al-Awaidy	6; 2	6; 3

== Hong Kong vs. Oman ==
Hong Kong
3
National Tennis Centre, Nonthaburi, Thailand
February 4, 2011
Hard (outdoors)

Oman
0

			1	2	3
1	(Hong Kong) (Oman)	Ho Ching Wu; Sarah Al Balushi	6; 0	6; 1
2	(Hong Kong) (Oman)	Zhang Ling; Fatma Al Nabhani	6; 2	1; 6	6; 1
3	(Hong Kong) (Oman)	Katherine Ip / Yan-Tung Ki; Sarah Al Balushi / Maliha Al-Awaidy	6; 0	6; 1

== Singapore vs. Turkmenistan ==
Singapore
2
National Tennis Centre, Nonthaburi, Thailand
February 4, 2011
Hard (outdoors)

Turkmenistan
1

			1	2	3
1	(Singapore) (Turkmenistan)	Clare Fong; Amangul Mollayeva	6; 2	6; 1
2	(Singapore) (Turkmenistan)	Stefanie Tan; Anastasiya Prenko	6; 3	6; 2
3	(Singapore) (Turkmenistan)	Ming Ming Joy Chia / Khee Yen Wee; Jenneta Halliyeva / Anastasiya Prenko	2; 6	4; 6

== See also ==
- Fed Cup structure
