= 2014 Fed Cup Asia/Oceania Zone Group II – Pool C =

Pool C of the 2014 Fed Cup Asia/Oceania Group II was one of four pools in the Asia/Oceania Group II of the 2014 Fed Cup. Three teams competed in a round robin competition, with the top team and the bottom two teams proceeding to their respective sections of the play-offs: the top team played for advancement to Group I.

== Standings ==
		(Turkmenistan) TKM	(Kyrgyzstan) KGZ	(Iraq) IRQ	RR; W–L	Set; W–L	Game; W–L	Standings
57	Turkmenistan		3–0	2–1	5–1	10–3	66–31	1
67	Kyrgyzstan	0–3		2–1	2–4	6–8	48–65	2
NR	Iraq	1–2	1–2		2–4	4–9	47–65	3

== Round-robin ==
=== Turkmenistan vs. Iraq ===
Turkmenistan
2
National Tennis Centre, Astana, Kazakhstan
4 February 2014
Hard (indoors)

Iraq
1

			1	2	3
1	(Turkmenistan) (Iraq)	Jahana Bayramova; Halla Alajeely	6; 0	7^{7} 6^{1}
2	(Turkmenistan) (Iraq)	Anastasiya Prenko; Ghada Alajeely	6; 1	6; 0
3	(Turkmenistan) (Iraq)	Jahana Bayramova / Guljahan Kadyrova; Ghada Alajeely / Halla Alajeely	2; 6	2; 6

=== Kyrgyzstan vs. Iraq ===
Kyrgyzstan
2
National Tennis Centre, Astana, Kazakhstan
5 February 2014
Hard (indoors)

Iraq
1

			1	2	3
1	(Kyrgyzstan) (Iraq)	Inna Volkovich; Halla Alajeely	6; 3	6; 1
2	(Kyrgyzstan) (Iraq)	Alina Lazareva; Ghada Alajeely	7; 5	5; 7	0; 6
3	(Kyrgyzstan) (Iraq)	Alina Lazareva / Inna Volkovich; Ghada Alajeely / Halla Alajeely	6; 2	6; 4

=== Turkmenistan vs. Kyrgyzstan ===
Turkmenistan
3
National Tennis Centre, Astana, Kazakhstan
6 February 2014
Hard (indoors)

Kyrgyzstan
0

			1	2	3
1	(Turkmenistan) (Kyrgyzstan)	Jahana Bayramova; Inna Volkovich	6; 1	1; 6	6; 3
2	(Turkmenistan) (Kyrgyzstan)	Anastasiya Prenko; Alina Lazareva	6; 0	6; 0
3	(Turkmenistan) (Kyrgyzstan)	Jenneta Halliyeva / Anastasiya Prenko; Erika Botalieva / Alina Lazareva	6; 1	6; 1
