= 2017 Fed Cup Asia/Oceania Zone Group II – Pool A =

Subsection of tennis competition

Pool A of the 2017 Fed Cup Asia/Oceania Group II was one of four pools in the Asia/Oceania Group II of the 2017 Fed Cup. Three teams competed in a round robin competition, with the top team and bottom teams proceeding to their respective sections of the play-offs: the top team played for advancement to Group I.

== Standings ==
		UZB	NZL	TKM	RR; W–L	Set; W–L	Game; W–L	Standings
50	Uzbekistan		3–0	3–0	2–0	12–1 (92%)	78–33 (70%)	1
87	New Zealand	0–3		3–0	1–1	7–6 (54%)	64–46 (58%)	2
69	Turkmenistan	0–3	0–3		0–2	0–12 (0%)	9–72 (11%)	3

Standings are determined by: 1. number of wins; 2. number of matches; 3. in two-team ties, head-to-head records; 4. in three-team ties, (a) percentage of sets won (head-to-head records if two teams remain tied), then (b) percentage of games won (head-to-head records if two teams remain tied), then (c) Fed Cup rankings.

== Round-robin ==
=== Turkmenistan vs. New Zealand ===
Turkmenistan
0
Pamir Stadium, Dushanbe, Tajikistan
18 July 2017
Hard

New Zealand
3

			1	2	3
1	(Turkmenistan) (New Zealand)	Jahana Bayramova; Paige Mary Hourigan	0; 6	0; 6
2	(Turkmenistan) (New Zealand)	Guljan Muhammetkuliyeva; Erin Routliffe	1; 6	0; 6
3	(Turkmenistan) (New Zealand)	Jahana Bayramova / Guljan Muhammetkuliyeva; Joanna Carswell / Erin Routliffe	2; 6	1; 6

=== Uzbekistan vs. Turkmenistan ===
Uzbekistan
3
Pamir Stadium, Dushanbe, Tajikistan
19 July 2017
Hard

Turkmenistan
0

			1	2	3
1	(Uzbekistan) (Turkmenistan)	Komola Umarova; Jahana Bayramova	6; 2	6; 0
2	(Uzbekistan) (Turkmenistan)	Sabina Sharipova; Guljan Muhammetkuliyeva	6; 1	6; 0
3	(Uzbekistan) (Turkmenistan)	Nigina Abduraimova / Akgul Amanmuradova; Jahana Bayramova / Guljan Muhammetkuliyeva	6; 0	6; 2

=== Uzbekistan vs. New Zealand ===
Uzbekistan
3
Pamir Stadium, Dushanbe, Tajikistan
20 July 2017
Hard

New Zealand
0

			1	2	3
1	(Uzbekistan) (New Zealand)	Nigina Abduraimova; Paige Mary Hourigan	7; 5	4; 6	7^{7} 6^{3}
2	(Uzbekistan) (New Zealand)	Sabina Sharipova; Erin Routliffe	6; 3	6; 1
3	(Uzbekistan) (New Zealand)	Akgul Amanmuradova / Komola Umarova; Joanna Carswell / Erin Routliffe	6; 3	6; 4

== See also ==
- Fed Cup structure
