= 2014 Fed Cup Asia/Oceania Zone Group II – Pool D =

Pool D of the 2014 Fed Cup Asia/Oceania Group II was one of four pools in the Asia/Oceania Group II of the 2014 Fed Cup. Four teams competed in a round robin competition, with the top team and the teams placed 2nd and 3rd proceeding to their respective sections of the play-offs: the top team played for advancement to Group I.

== Standings ==
		(India) IND	(Iran) IRI	(New Zealand) NZL	(Pakistan) PAK	RR; W–L	Set; W–L	Game; W–L	Standings	
58	India		3–0	2–1	3–0	3–0	8–1	16–2	101–37	1
97	Iran	0–3		0–3	2–1	1–2	1–8	3–16	44–106	3
62	New Zealand	1–2	3–0		3–0	2–1	7–2	14–4	95–34	2
76	Pakistan	0–3	1–2	0–3		0–3	1–8	3–16	43–106	4

== Round-robin ==
=== India vs. Iran ===
India
3
National Tennis Centre, Astana, Kazakhstan
4 February 2014
Hard (indoors)

Iran
0

			1	2	3
1	(India) (Iran)	Rishika Sunkara; Ghazaleh Torkaman	6; 0	6; 0
2	(India) (Iran)	Prarthana Thombare; Sahar Amini Hajibashi	7^{7} 6^{2}	6; 0
3	(India) (Iran)	Ankita Raina / Sania Mirza; Sadaf Sadeghvaziri / Ghazal Pakbaten	6; 0	6; 1

=== New Zealand vs. Pakistan ===
New Zealand
3
National Tennis Centre, Astana, Kazakhstan
4 February 2014
Hard (indoors)

Pakistan
0

			1	2	3
1	(New Zealand) (Pakistan)	Dianne Hollands; Ushna Suhail	6; 1	6; 0
2	(New Zealand) (Pakistan)	Marina Erakovic; Sara Mansoor	6; 0	6; 1
3	(New Zealand) (Pakistan)	Abigail Guthrie / Emma Hayman; Maheen Dada / Rida Khalid	6; 0	6; 1

=== India vs. Pakistan ===
India
3
National Tennis Centre, Astana, Kazakhstan
5 February 2014
Hard (indoors)

Pakistan
0

			1	2	3
1	(India) (Pakistan)	Prarthana Thombare; Ushna Suhail	6; 0	6; 1
2	(India) (Pakistan)	Ankita Raina; Sara Mansoor	6; 1	6; 2
3	(India) (Pakistan)	Rishika Sunkara / Prarthana Thombare; Sara Mansoor / Ushna Suhail	6; 2	6; 1

=== Iran vs. New Zealand ===
Iran
0
National Tennis Centre, Astana, Kazakhstan
5 February 2014
Hard (indoors)

New Zealand
3

			1	2	3
1	(Iran) (New Zealand)	Sahar Amini Hajibashi; Emma Hayman	1; 6	2; 6
2	(Iran) (New Zealand)	Sadaf Sadeghvaziri; Marina Erakovic	0; 6	0; 6
3	(Iran) (New Zealand)	Ghazal Pakbaten / Ghazaleh Torkaman; Abigail Guthrie / Dianne Hollands	0; 6	0; 6

=== India vs. New Zealand ===
India
2
National Tennis Centre, Astana, Kazakhstan
6 February 2014
Hard (indoors)

New Zealand
1

			1	2	3
1	(India) (New Zealand)	Prarthana Thombare; Dianne Hollands	6; 1	6; 4
2	(India) (New Zealand)	Ankita Raina; Marina Erakovic	1; 6	2; 6
3	(India) (New Zealand)	Sania Mirza / Prarthana Thombare; Marina Erakovic / Abigail Guthrie	7; 5	6; 1

=== Iran vs. Pakistan ===
Iran
2
National Tennis Centre, Astana, Kazakhstan
6 February 2014
Hard (indoors)

Pakistan
1

			1	2	3
1	(Iran) (Pakistan)	Ghazaleh Torkaman; Ushna Suhail	3; 6	2; 6
2	(Iran) (Pakistan)	Sahar Amini Hajibashi; Sara Mansoor	6; 3	6; 1
3	(Iran) (Pakistan)	Sahar Amini Hajibashi / Ghazal Pakbaten; Sara Mansoor / Ushna Suhail	7^{10} 6^{8}	3; 6	7; 5
