= 2017 Fed Cup Asia/Oceania Zone Group II – Pool B =

Subsection of tennis competition

Pool B of the 2017 Fed Cup Asia/Oceania Group II was one of four pools in the Asia/Oceania Group II of the 2017 Fed Cup. Three teams competed in a round robin competition, with the top team and bottom teams proceeding to their respective sections of the play-offs: the top team played for advancement to Group I.

== Standings ==
		HKG	POC	IRI	RR; W–L	Set; W–L	Game; W–L	Standings
57	Hong Kong		3–0	3–0	2–0	12–0 (100%)	73–32 (70%)	1
71	Pacific Oceania	0–3		3–0	1–1	6–7 (46%)	62–57 (48%)	2
78	Iran	0–3	0–3		0–2	1–12 (8%)	28–74 (27%)	3

Standings are determined by: 1. number of wins; 2. number of matches; 3. in two-team ties, head-to-head records; 4. in three-team ties, (a) percentage of sets won (head-to-head records if two teams remain tied), then (b) percentage of games won (head-to-head records if two teams remain tied), then (c) Fed Cup rankings.

== Round-robin ==
=== Hong Kong vs. Iran ===
Hong Kong
3
Pamir Stadium, Dushanbe, Tajikistan
18 July 2017
Hard

Iran
0

			1	2	3
1	(Hong Kong) (Iran)	Eudice Chong; Sadaf Sadeghvaziri	6; 1	6; 1
2	(Hong Kong) (Iran)	Zhang Ling; Ghazal Pakbaten	6; 0	6; 2
3	(Hong Kong) (Iran)	Katherine Ip / Ng Kwan-yau; Sara Amiri / Yasmin Mansouri	6; 1	6; 3

=== Pacific Oceania vs. Iran ===
Pacific Oceania
3
Pamir Stadium, Dushanbe, Tajikistan
19 July 2017
Hard

Iran
0

			1	2	3
1	(Pacific Oceania) (Iran)	Steffi Carruthers; Yasmin Mansouri	6; 4	6; 2
2	(Pacific Oceania) (Iran)	Abigail Tere-Apisah; Sara Amiri	6; 3	6; 0
3	(Pacific Oceania) (Iran)	Carol Young Suh Lee / Mayka Zima; Ghazal Pakbaten / Sadaf Sadeghvaziri	2; 6	6; 3	6; 2

=== Hong Kong vs. Pacific Oceania ===
Hong Kong
3
Pamir Stadium, Dushanbe, Tajikistan
20 July 2017
Hard

Pacific Oceania
0

			1	2	3
1	(Hong Kong) (Pacific Oceania)	Eudice Chong; Steffi Carruthers	7; 5	6; 3
2	(Hong Kong) (Pacific Oceania)	Zhang Ling; Abigail Tere-Apisah	6; 4	6; 4
3	(Hong Kong) (Pacific Oceania)	Katherine Ip / Ng Kwan-yau; Carol Young Suh Lee / Mayka Zima	6; 4	6; 4

== See also ==
- Fed Cup structure
