= 2014 Fed Cup Asia/Oceania Zone Group II – Pool B =

Pool B of the 2014 Fed Cup Asia/Oceania Group II was one of four pools in the Asia/Oceania Group II of the 2014 Fed Cup. Three teams competed in a round robin competition, with the top team and the bottom two teams proceeding to their respective sections of the play-offs: the top team played for advancement to Group I.

== Standings ==
		(Philippines) PHI	(Singapore) SIN	(Sri Lanka) SRI	RR; W–L	Set; W–L	Game; W–L	Standings
49	Philippines		3–0	3–0	6–0	12–0	72–16	1
72	Singapore	0–3		2–1	2–4	4–8	39–61	2
84	Sri Lanka	0–3	1–2		1–5	2–10	31–65	3

== Round-robin ==
=== Philippines vs. Singapore ===
Philippines
3
National Tennis Centre, Astana, Kazakhstan
4 February 2014
Hard (indoors)

Singapore
0

			1	2	3
1	(Philippines) (Singapore)	Anna Clarice Patrimonio; Geraldine Ang	6; 3	6; 0
2	(Philippines) (Singapore)	Marian Jade Capadocia; Rheeya Doshi	6; 4	6; 1
3	(Philippines) (Singapore)	Marian Jade Capadocia / Anna Clarice Patrimonio; Joanne Koh / Geraldine Ang	6; 1	6; 1

=== Singapore vs. Sri Lanka ===
Singapore
2
National Tennis Centre, Astana, Kazakhstan
5 February 2014
Hard (indoors)

Sri Lanka
1

			1	2	3
1	(Singapore) (Sri Lanka)	Geraldine Ang; Nethmi Himashi Waduge	7^{7} 6^{5}	6; 3
2	(Singapore) (Sri Lanka)	Rheeya Doshi; Amreetha Muttiah	6; 1	6; 3
3	(Singapore) (Sri Lanka)	Geraldine Ang / Joanne Koh; Amreetha Muttiah / Medhira Samarasinghe	1; 6	3; 6

=== Philippines v Sri Lanka ===
Philippines
3
National Tennis Centre, Astana, Kazakhstan
6 February 2014
Hard (indoors)

Sri Lanka
0

			1	2	3
1	(Philippines) (Sri Lanka)	Anna Clarice Patrimonio; Medhira Samarasinghe	6; 1	6; 0
2	(Philippines) (Sri Lanka)	Marian Jade Capadocia; Nethmi Himashi Waduge	6; 3	6; 0
3	(Philippines) (Sri Lanka)	Marian Jade Capadocia / Anna Clarice Patrimonio; Kemalie Herath / Amreetha Muttiah	6; 1	6; 1

== See also ==
- Fed Cup structure
