= 2014 Fed Cup Asia/Oceania Zone Group II – Pool A =

Pool A of the 2014 Fed Cup Asia/Oceania Group II was one of four pools in the Asia/Oceania Group II of the 2014 Fed Cup. Three teams competed in a round robin competition, with the top team and the bottom two teams proceeding to their respective sections of the play-offs: the top team played for advancement to Group I.

== Standings ==
		(Hong Kong) HKG	(Malaysia) MAS	(Vietnam) VIE	RR; W–L	Set; W–L	Game; W–L	Standings
44	Hong Kong		3–0	3–0	6–0	12–0	72–15	1
71	Malaysia	0–3		2–1	2–4	4–8	43–62	2
78	Vietnam	0–3	1–2		1–5	2–10	31–69	3

== Round-robin ==
=== Malaysia vs. Vietnam ===
Malaysia
2
National Tennis Centre, Astana, Kazakhstan
4 February 2014
Hard (indoors)

Vietnam
1

			1	2	3
1	(Malaysia) (Vietnam)	Aslina Chua An Ping; Trần Thị Tâm Hảo	3; 6	5; 7
2	(Malaysia) (Vietnam)	Alyssa Boey; Huỳnh Phi Khanh	6; 3	6; 2
3	(Malaysia) (Vietnam)	Alyssa Boey / Aslina Chua An Ping; Huỳnh Phi Khanh / Trần Thị Tâm Hảo	6; 3	7; 5

=== Hong Kong vs. Vietnam ===
Hong Kong
3
National Tennis Centre, Astana, Kazakhstan
5 February 2014
Hard (indoors)

Vietnam
0

			1	2	3
1	(Hong Kong) (Vietnam)	Wu Ho-ching; Trần Thị Tâm Hảo	6; 3	6; 2
2	(Hong Kong) (Vietnam)	Zhang Ling; Huỳnh Phi Khanh	6; 0	6; 0
3	(Hong Kong) (Vietnam)	Eudice Chong / Zhang Ling; Đào Minh Trang / Phan Thị Thanh Bình	6; 0	6; 0

=== Hong Kong vs. Malaysia ===
Hong Kong
3
National Tennis Centre, Astana, Kazakhstan
6 February 2014
Hard (indoors)

Malaysia
0

			1	2	3
1	(Hong Kong) (Malaysia)	Eudice Chong; Aslina Chua An Ping	6; 3	6; 4
2	(Hong Kong) (Malaysia)	Zhang Ling; Alyssa Boey	6; 0	6; 0
3	(Hong Kong) (Malaysia)	Ng Kwan-yau / Wu Ho-ching; Yus Syazlin Nabila Binti Yusri / Michelle Li Sha Khoo	6; 1	6; 2

== See also ==
- Fed Cup structure
