= 2017 Fed Cup Asia/Oceania Zone Group II – Pool C =

Subsection of tennis competition

Pool C of the 2017 Fed Cup Asia/Oceania Group II was one of four pools in the Asia/Oceania Group II of the 2017 Fed Cup. Three teams competed in a round robin competition, with the top team and bottom teams proceeding to their respective sections of the play-offs: the top team played for advancement to Group I.

== Standings ==
		MAS	SGP	PAK	RR; W–L	Set; W–L	Game; W–L	Standings
63	Malaysia		3–0	3–0	2–0	12–1 (92%)	78–47 (62%)	1
60	Singapore	0–3		3–0	1–1	6–9 (40%)	70–80 (47%)	2
79	Pakistan	0–3	0–3		0–2	4–12 (25%)	69–90 (43%)	3

Standings are determined by: 1. number of wins; 2. number of matches; 3. in two-team ties, head-to-head records; 4. in three-team ties, (a) percentage of sets won (head-to-head records if two teams remain tied), then (b) percentage of games won (head-to-head records if two teams remain tied), then (c) Fed Cup rankings.

== Round-robin ==
=== Singapore vs. Malaysia ===
Singapore
0
Pamir Stadium, Dushanbe, Tajikistan
18 July 2017
Hard

Malaysia
3

			1	2	3
1	(Singapore) (Malaysia)	Lynelle En Tong Lim; Aslina Chua	3; 6	1; 6
2	(Singapore) (Malaysia)	Y-kit Nicole Tan; Theiviya Selvarajoo	2; 6	3; 6
3	(Singapore) (Malaysia)	Charmaine Shi Yi Seah / Y-kit Nicole Tan; Uma Nayar / Theiviya Selvarajoo	6^{5} 7^{7}	5; 7

=== Singapore vs. Pakistan ===
Singapore
3
Pamir Stadium, Dushanbe, Tajikistan
19 July 2017
Hard

Pakistan
0

			1	2	3
1	(Singapore) (Pakistan)	Charmaine Shi Yi Seah; Mahin Qureshi	5; 7	6; 2	6; 3
2	(Singapore) (Pakistan)	Y-kit Nicole Tan; Ushna Suhail	2; 6	6; 3	7; 5
3	(Singapore) (Pakistan)	Angela Shan Min Lim / Charmaine Shi Yi Seah; Mahin Qureshi / Ushna Suhail	6; 3	5; 7	7^{11} 6^{9}

=== Malaysia vs. Pakistan ===
Malaysia
3
Pamir Stadium, Dushanbe, Tajikistan
20 July 2017
Hard

Pakistan
0

			1	2	3
1	(Malaysia) (Pakistan)	Aslina Chua; Sarah Mahboob Khan	7^{7} 6^{3}	7; 5
2	(Malaysia) (Pakistan)	Theiviya Selvarajoo; Ushna Suhail	6; 1	2; 6	6; 4
3	(Malaysia) (Pakistan)	Aslina Chua / Uma Nayar; Sarah Mahboob Khan / Mahin Qureshi	6; 3	6; 2

== See also ==
- Fed Cup structure
