= 2017 Fed Cup Asia/Oceania Zone Group II – Pool D =

Subsection of tennis competition

Pool D of the 2017 Fed Cup Asia/Oceania Group II was one of four pools in the Asia/Oceania Group II of the 2017 Fed Cup. Four teams competed in a round robin competition, with the top team and bottom teams proceeding to their respective sections of the play-offs: the top team played for advancement to Group I.

== Standings ==
		INA	SRI	TJK	KGZ	RR; W–L	Set; W–L	Game; W–L	Standings
61	Indonesia		3–0	3–0	3–0	3–0	18–0 (100%)	108–21 (84%)	1
76	Sri Lanka	0–3		2–1	3–0	2–1	9–9 (50%)	95–73 (57%)	2
NR	Tajikistan	0–3	1–2		2–1	1–2	6–11 (35%)	58–95 (38%)	3
85	Kyrgyzstan	0–3	0–3	1–2		0–3	3–16 (16%)	34–106 (24%)	4

Standings are determined by: 1. number of wins; 2. number of matches; 3. in two-team ties, head-to-head records; 4. in three-team ties, (a) percentage of sets won (head-to-head records if two teams remain tied), then (b) percentage of games won (head-to-head records if two teams remain tied), then (c) Fed Cup rankings.

== Round-robin ==
=== Indonesia vs. Kyrgyzstan ===
Indonesia
3
Pamir Stadium, Dushanbe, Tajikistan
18 July 2017
Hard

Kyrgyzstan
0

			1	2	3
1	(Indonesia) (Kyrgyzstan)	Lavinia Tananta; Alina Lazareva	6; 0	6; 0
2	(Indonesia) (Kyrgyzstan)	Beatrice Gumulya; Myrzaiym Sherikulova	6; 0	6; 2
3	(Indonesia) (Kyrgyzstan)	Jessy Rompies / Aldila Sutjiadi; Aigerim Akzhol Kyzy / Alina Lazareva	6; 0	6; 0

=== Sri Lanka vs. Tajikistan ===
Sri Lanka
2
Pamir Stadium, Dushanbe, Tajikistan
18 July 2017
Hard

Tajikistan
1

			1	2	3
1	(Sri Lanka) (Tajikistan)	Thisuri Molligoda; Takhmina Burkhanova	6; 2	6; 2
2	(Sri Lanka) (Tajikistan)	Nethmi Himashi Waduge; Anastasiya Tursunova	7; 5	5; 7	4; 6
3	(Sri Lanka) (Tajikistan)	Thisuri Molligoda / Medhira Samarasinghe; Takhmina Burkhanova / Anastasiya Tursunova	6; 1	6; 1

=== Indonesia vs. Tajikistan ===
Indonesia
3
Pamir Stadium, Dushanbe, Tajikistan
19 July 2017
Hard

Tajikistan
0

			1	2	3
1	(Indonesia) (Tajikistan)	Aldila Sutjiadi; Takhmina Burkhanova	6; 3	6; 1
2	(Indonesia) (Tajikistan)	Lavinia Tananta; Anastasiya Tursunova	6; 0	6; 2
3	(Indonesia) (Tajikistan)	Beatrice Gumulya / Jessy Rompies; Kamila Mulloeva / Nargizakhon Yakhyaeva	6; 0	6; 0

=== Sri Lanka vs. Kyrgyzstan ===
Sri Lanka
3
Pamir Stadium, Dushanbe, Tajikistan
19 July 2017
Hard

Kyrgyzstan
0

			1	2	3
1	(Sri Lanka) (Kyrgyzstan)	Medhira Samarasinghe; Aigerim Akzhol Kyzy	6; 1	6; 0
2	(Sri Lanka) (Kyrgyzstan)	Thisuri Molligoda; Alina Lazareva	6; 1	6; 0
3	(Sri Lanka) (Kyrgyzstan)	Roshenka Fernando / Medhira Samarasinghe; Alina Lazareva / Myrzaiym Sherikulova	6^{5} 7^{7}	6; 0	6; 4

=== Indonesia vs. Sri Lanka ===
Indonesia
3
Pamir Stadium, Dushanbe, Tajikistan
20 July 2017
Hard

Sri Lanka
0

			1	2	3
1	(Indonesia) (Sri Lanka)	Aldila Sutjiadi; Thisuri Molligoda	6; 2	6; 3
2	(Indonesia) (Sri Lanka)	Beatrice Gumulya; Nethmi Himashi Waduge	6; 4	6; 2
3	(Indonesia) (Sri Lanka)	Jessy Rompies / Lavinia Tananta; Thisuri Molligoda / Medhira Samarasinghe	6; 0	6; 2

=== Kyrgyzstan vs. Tajikistan ===
Kyrgyzstan
1
Pamir Stadium, Dushanbe, Tajikistan
20 July 2017
Hard

Tajikistan
2

			1	2	3
1	(Kyrgyzstan) (Tajikistan)	Aigerim Akzhol Kyzy; Takhmina Burkhanova	2; 6	1; 6
2	(Kyrgyzstan) (Tajikistan)	Myrzaiym Sherikulova; Anastasiya Tursunova	2; 6	2; 6
3	(Kyrgyzstan) (Tajikistan)	Alina Lazareva / Myrzaiym Sherikulova; Kamila Mulloeva / Nargizakhon Yakhyaeva	6; 2	6; 2

== See also ==
- Fed Cup structure
