= Turkmenistan Billie Jean King Cup team =

National women's tennis team

Turkmenistan
- Captain: Marina Bander
- Nations Ranking: 47 ▼2 (16 November 2015)
- Highest ranking: 53 (22 April 2013)
- Lowest ranking: 92 (11 July 2005)
- Colors: green & white
- First year: 2004
- Years played: 8
- Ties played (W–L): 31 (14–17)
- Best finish: Zonal Group II RR
- Most total wins: Anastasiya Prenko (24–15)
- Most singles wins: Anastasiya Prenko (14–9)
- Most doubles wins: Anastasiya Prenko (10–6)
- Best doubles team: Jenneta Halliyeva / Anastasiya Prenko (6–3)
- Most ties played: Anastasiya Prenko (24)
- Most years played: Jenneta Halliyeva (6); Anastasiya Prenko (6)

The Turkmenistan Fed Cup team represents Turkmenistan in international women's tennis and is directed by the Turkmenistan Tennis Association. The team played in the first ever tournament in 2004, and five occasions since. Prior to 1993, Turkmenistani players competed for the Soviet Union.

The team has achieved very few feats in competition, particularly in their early history. During their first two years, they only won two rubbers in seven ties. In recent times, they have been more successful, winning at least two ties per year since 2011. Nevertheless, they still compete in Asia/Oceania Group II, the lowest level of competition for teams from the Asian Tennis Federation. As of 2013 they have a 9–16 win–loss ratio.

Nelli Voynich is their captain, having been in that position since 2013. Anastasiya Prenko holds the record for most singles wins, doubles wins, and total wins, while sharing the record with Jenneta Halliyeva for most ties partaken in. As of April 2013, the team is ranked No. 53 in women's team tennis by the International Tennis Federation, their highest ranking since initiation.

== Current team ==
Name	DOB	First	Last	Ties	Win/Loss			Ranks (Note: Most recent Year-End ranks (2012). An asterisk indicates combined junior ranks. See)	
Name	DOB	First	Last	Ties	Sin	Dou	Tot	Sin	Dou
Jahana Bayramova	November 5, 1997	2013	2013	5	1–4	1–1	2–5	1341=*	
Guljan Muhammetkuliyeva	September 17, 1997	2012	2012	1	0–0	0–1	0–1	1776=*	
Anastasiya Prenko	March 12, 1993	2008	2013	18	10–7	9–6	19–13	N/A	984=

== History ==
=== Early history ===
Tennis began in Turkmenistan when it was a member of the Soviet Union, but it failed to grow due to its expensive and individual nature, meaning it was neglected financially by the government in favor of team sports. However, after the break-up of the Soviet Union, Turkmenistan began developing its tennis players and, although many of their best players ended up emigrating and changing citizenship, the sport continued to grow in the country with support of the government and it became a full member of the International Tennis Federation in 1993. Ten years later, the first ITF tournament held in Turkmenistan was played as a Grade 5 junior event on during September 2003. The girls' singles edition consisted entirely of Turkmenistani players, and was won by seventeen-year-old Ummarahmat Hummetova, who defeated Almira Hallyeva in the final. Following this event, Hummetova ascended to the top seven-hundred junior singles rankings to become Turkmenistan's highest-ranked women's tennis player, and Hallyeva, who won the doubles edition of the event, became the top doubles player alongside her partner Veronika Babayan.

One year later, Turkmenistan entered its first ever Fed Cup tournament as a team from the country partook in Group II of the 2004 Asia/Oceania Zone. Their team consisted of Hummetova, Hallyeva, Babayan and Jenneta Halliyeva, who served as their playing captain. They played in one single pool alongside Pacific Oceania, ranked No. 67, Kazakhstan, No. 72, Singapore, No. 77, and Syria, No. 95. However, the team was ultimately unsuccessful, not winning a single set in their first three matches against Singapore, Pacific Oceania, and Kazakhstan. Although they won a match against Syria, with Hummetova and Babayan defeating Nivin Kezbari and Hazar Sidki in doubles, they still finished last in the pool and came into the rankings as equal No. 90 and finished the year ranked equal No. 91, only higher on the rankings than Eastern Caribbean and Kenya.

Hummetova and Hallyeva then competed for Turkmenistan again the next year alongside fourteen-year-old Inna Gavrilenko, with Halliyeva this time acting as a non-playing captain. This time they played in a group comprising four teams: Uzbekistan (No. 53), Philippines (No. 64) and Syria (No. 79). Although the team started well, managing their first singles win as Hummetova defeated Sidki in straight sets, they once again ended up performing poorly, losing to the Syrians 1–2 and only managing to win four and two games respectively against Philippines and Uzbekistan. This led to the team finishing the year ranked No. 92, lower than every other team in the ITF.

=== 2006–2012: Break in competition and Group II gains ===
Turkmenistan did not return to Fed Cup competition in 2006 or 2007, but it was during this period that Anastasiya Prenko, Marina Lidiya and Ayna Ereshova all played in their first tournaments in the ITF junior circuit. Prenko in particular achieved significant success, reaching quarterfinals of Grade 4 tournaments in Kyrgyzstan and Uzbekistan in both singles and doubles, and in early 2008 managing a quarterfinal finish at a Grade 3 singles tournament in India.

Following these good results, Prenko was picked for the Turkmenistan Fed Cup team, which had selected to partake in competition in 2008. Joining her in the team was Lidiya, Ummarahmat Hummetova and Jenneta Halliyeva, with Ashgabat tennis tournament director and captain of the Turkmenistan Davis Cup Gulcha Byashimov to act as the team's captain. They were placed in Group II, Pool B alongside Kazakhstan (No. 50), Singapore (No. 60) and the unranked Sri Lanka. Although they began competition poorly, losing to the Kazakhs 0–3 and Prenko and Hummetova sustaining a double bagel loss in doubles, they won a rubber in a 1–2 loss against Singapore after Prenko defeated Carolyn Ann Lim Hui, 6–1, 6–2, and they defeated Sri Lanka 2–1 after Prenko achieved another straight sets singles win over Amreetha Muttiah and a doubles win over Jithmie Jayawickrema and Mahesha Seneviratne alongside Halliyeva. This led them to progress to the play-off for fifth place in the Group alongside Pool A's third-place finisher Syria. Lidiya lost the first rubber to Kim Sadi, but Prenko delivered again for the team by beating Line al-Ghannam in singles and Lara Alsamman and Ranim Mkahal in doubles once again with Halliyeva. This led to a fifth-place finish for the Turkmens, the first time they placed above last place in Group II, and caused their ranking to ascend over twenty places to No. 69.

Following this and other successes, Prenko was recognised by various publications of Turkmenistan's biggest tennis star. However, despite the recent achievements of the Fed Cup team, and the fact that they were originally selected to play, the team took another break from competition in 2009 and 2010. During this period, Amangul Mollayeva and Guljahan Kadyrova both joined the junior circuit and Prenko reached her highest pro circuit singles ranking of No. 536.

However, Turkmenistan returned to Fed Cup in 2011, ranked No. 81, with Prenko, the WTA single No. 765, leading the team with Halliyeva, Mollayeva and Ereshova also competing and Byashimov acting once again as captain. The team was placed in Pool B in the ground, alongside Hong Kong (No. 50), Singapore (No. 67) and Fed Cup first-timers Oman. They played against Hong Kong in their opening tie, and were soundly defeated winning no games across the two singles rubbers and three games in the doubles rubber. Nevertheless, the team managed a clear win over Oman, Halliyeva easily defeating Maliha Al-Awaidy, Prenko made a comeback to upset Fatma Al Nabhani, despite being ranked three hundred places below her on the pro circuit, and Ereshova and Mollayeva finished off the tie by winning the doubles rubber. The Turkmens then lost to Singapore, 1–2, by losing both singles matches, but their performance was still enough for them to qualify for the fifth-place play-off, with their Pool A equivalent Pakistan. Mollayeva lost the first match against the Pakistani Ushna Suhail, but Prenko delivered for the Turkmens once more by defeating Sarah Mahboob Khan in singles, and with Suhail in doubles alongside Halliyeva. This allowed another fifth-place finish for Turkmenistan, and caused their rank to ascend to No. 73, their highest at the time since initiation.

Turkmenistan then returned to Fed Cup in 2012, where they were placed in Pool B alongside Philippines (No. 59), India (No. 61), Oman (No. 82) and Iran (No. 91) Following their previous successes, they were ranked No. 72 at the time of competition and thus were the middle-ranked team of the pool. Prenko returned to competition, alongside Halliyeva, Hummetova and junior newcomer Guljan Muhammetkuliyeva. Byashimov also returned as captain.

The team was drawn to play the Omani in the first day, in which Halliyeva easily defeated Al-Awaidy, Prenko was handily defeated by Al Nabhani, and Halliyeva and Prenko came back from a set down to win the deciding doubles rubber. Turkmenistan was then handily defeated by India, winning only six games across the three rubbers, and narrowly fell to Philippines 1–2 with Hummetova suffering a double bagel to Tamitha Nguyen and Prenko and Halliyeva losing in doubles, despite Prenko managing to win against Anna Clarice Patrimonio in three sets. Turkmenistan then finished their pool strongly, managing their easiest Fed Cup win since initiation by defeating the Iranians whilst only dropping six games. This caused Turkmenistan to place third in their pool, and be drawn against Singapore for their fifth-place play-off. Despite losing their previous three meetings with the Singaporeans, they won their tie fairly easily, winning all three rubbers in straight sets, to once again claim fifth place in the Group. These good results were, relative to the number of ties, Turkmenistan's best ever in a year since initiation, and caused their ranking to ascend once again to No. 63.

=== 2013–present ===
Turkmenistan selected to play Fed Cup again in 2013, the first time they competed in women's team tennis for three consecutive years. Prenko and Halliyeva were selected once again for competition, with Maya Mammetguykyyeva and ITF junior circuit newcomer and promising young player Jahana Bayramova both making a debut. Mammetguykyyeva, however, was later replaced by Guljahan Kadryova. Gulchan Byashimov did not return this year as captain; he was replaced with veteran coach Nelli Voynich. They were placed in Pool A with Hong Kong (No. 47), New Zealand (No. 59), Singapore (No. 71) and first-timers Vietnam.

The team started horribly against Hong Kong, Bayramova losing in a double bagel singles rubber to Wu Ho-ching and Eudice Chong and Katherine Ip in doubles with Halliyeva. Prenko, the only player to put up any resistance to the Hong Kongers, also fell to Venise Chan despite winning the first set. Bayramova continued her poor run by losing to Singapore's Geraldine Ang, though Prenko performed to allow Turkmenistan to win the tie by beating Rheeya Doshi in singles and clenching the doubles rubber. Those two rubbers would be last that Turkmenistan would win in the pool, however, as they went down disastrously to New Zealand despite the Kiwis missing their top player due to injury, with Kadyrova and Bayramova not being able to win a game in singles over Emma Hayman and Emily Fanning, and the team suffering a defeat by the Vietnamese after Trần Thị Tâm Hảo and Huỳnh Phương Đài Trang beat Bayramova and Prenko in singles. This led to Turkmenistan coming in fourth in the pool, the first time they had placed so low since 2005. Nevertheless, they reclaimed some glory in the seventh-place play-off by winning over Kyrgyzstan, 3–0, with Bayramova claiming her first Fed Cup singles win over Arina Beliaeva, Prenko defeating Bermet Duvanaeva, and the two coming together to easily win the doubles rubber, 6–1, 6–1. Despite only making seventh place in the Group this year, they still ascended the rankings once again coming in at No. 57.

== Players ==
Twelve players have represented Fed Cup for Turkmenistan since its inception in 2004. Anastasiya Prenko and Jenneta Halliyeva share the record for most ties played, having appeared in eighteen ties during their respective four and five-year career. Halliyeva, with five years, also holds the record for most years played in the Turkmenistani Fed Cup team. Ummarahmat Hummetova is third for most ties played, at thirteen, and is also equal second for number of years at four. With these statistics, Hummetova is the only player aside from Prenko and Halliyeva to have played in more than five ties and two years. Prenko holds the record for most matches in a year, with eight, having gained the record in 2013. She also shares the record with Jahana Bayramova for most ties in a year at five.

Prenko holds the record for most singles wins at nineteen. She acquired her first win over Singapore's Carolyn Ann Lim Hui in 2008. in what was in fact the team's first singles win after Hummetova defeated Hazar Sidki of Syria in 2005. Prenko is also the team's most prolific singles player holding a 10–7 win–loss ratio from four years of competition, and the youngest person to win a singles match for Turkmenistan having defeated Lim Hui aged 14 years, 10 months; six months younger than her closest contender Bayramova.

In addition to her singles accomplishments, Prenko is also Turkmenistan's most efficacious doubles player, having accumulated the most doubles wins at nine (four more than the second, Halliyeva) and also holding the best doubles win–loss ratio at 9–6. She had her first doubles win, and setting of the record of youngest doubles winner for Turkmenistan's Fed Cup team, alongside Halliyeva having defeated Sri Lanka's Jithmie Jayawickrema and Mahesha Seneviratne in straight sets. Prenko and Halliyeva also hold the record for most doubles wins for Turkmenistan as a pair, with five. Hummetova and Veronika Babayan won the team's first doubles win over Hazar Sidki and Nivin Kezbari in 2004.

The youngest person to play for Turkmenistan in Fed Cup was Inna Gavrilenko, who played one singles match in which she was defeated by Denise Dy in 2005. Halliyeva is the oldest woman to play for team, at thirty years, and the oldest person to win a match for the team, defeating Hannah En Xin Chew five days after her twenty-ninth birthday.

Name	Years	First	Ties	Win – Loss		
Name	Years	First	Ties	Singles	Doubles	Total
Anastasiya Azimbayeva	1	2019	3	0–2	1–0	1–2
Veronika Babayan	1	2004	3	0–1	1–2	1–3
Jahana Bayramova	4	2013	14	5–9	3–6	8–15
Ayna Ereshova	1	2011	1	0–0	1–0	1–0
Inna Gavrilenko	1	2005	1	0–1	0–0	0–1
Jenneta Halliyeva	6	2004	18	4–5	6–5	10–10
Almira Hallyeva	2	2004	4	0–4	0–4	0–8
Ummarahmat Hummetova	4	2004	13	1–7	3–8	4–15
Guljahan Kadyrova	2	2013	4	0–1	1–2	1–3
Rozhan Karajayeva	2	2019	5	0–1	0–3	0–4
Arzuv Klycheva	2	2019	7	0–5	0–5	0–10
Marina Lidiya	1	2008	1	0–1	0–0	0–1
Amangul Mollayeva	1	2011	4	0–3	1–0	1–3
Guljan Muhammetkuliyeva	4	2012	10	1–5	3–3	4–8
Anastasiya Prenko	6	2008	24	14–9	10–6	24–15
Bahar Toymyradova	2	2019	5	0–3	0–2	0–5

=== Ranks ===
Of the twelve players to play for the Turkmenistan Fed Cup team, eleven achieved junior rankings and one an ITF pro circuit ranking. Anatasiya Prenko holds the record for the highest ranking in both instances, achieving a top two hundred junior ranking, and top six hundred pro circuit ranking in both singles and doubles after achieving good results in the 2010 and 2011 ITF Women's Circuits. Of the other players, three achieved a top thousand junior ranking: Ummarahmat Hummetova, Almira Hallyeva and Veronika Babayan.

==== Pro Circuit ====
**Player**	**Rank Highs**		**Record**	**W%**	**Hardcourt**	**Clay**	**Grass**	**Carpet**
**Player**	**Sin**	**Dou**	**Record**	**W%**	**Hardcourt**	**Clay**	**Grass**	**Carpet**
**Anastasiya Prenko**	536	529	19–13	59.4%	19–13	0–0	0–0	0–0

==== Junior Circuit ====
**Player**	**Rank Highs**			**Record**	**W%**	**Hardcourt**	**Clay**	**Grass**	**Carpet**
**Player**	**Sin**	**Dou**	**Com**	**Record**	**W%**	**Hardcourt**	**Clay**	**Grass**	**Carpet**
**Anastasiya Prenko**			152	19–13	59.4%	19–13	0–0	0–0	0–0
Ummarahmat Hummetova	687=	935=		4–15	21.1%	4–15	0–0	0–0	0–0
Almira Hallyeva	860=	810=	705=	0–8	0%	0–8	0–0	0–0	0–0
Veronika Babayan	986=	810=	780=	1–3	25%	1–3	0–0	0–0	0–0
Inna Gavrilenko			1005=	0–1	0%	0–1	0–0	0–0	0–0
**Jahana Bayramova**			1084=	2–5	28.6%	2–5	0–0	0–0	0–0
Ayna Ereshova			1391=	1–0	100%	1–0	0–0	0–0	0–0
Amangul Mollayeva			1399=	1–3	25%	1–3	0–0	0–0	0–0
**Guljan Muhammetkuliyeva**			1539=	0–1	0%	0–1	0–0	0–0	0–0
Guljahan Kadyrova			1556=	1–1	50%	1–1	0–0	0–0	0–0
Marina Lidiya			1690=	0–1	0%	0–1	0–0	0–0	0–0

*Active players in bold, statistics as of 30 April 2013.

== Captains ==
Tennis coach Nelli Voynich is the current captain of the Turkmenistani Fed Cup team. She had previously coached the country's top player Anastasiya Prenko and upcoming junior Jahana Bayramova.

- Jenneta Halliyeva was the first captain of the Fed Cup team, and also incidentally served as playing captain during her first year. While her team did not win any ties during her entire length as team, she did oversee the team's first victories in singles and doubles and, after she stood down as captain for Turkmenistan's return to competition in 2008, she became a regular player.
- Gulcha Byashimov took over as captain after the team returned in 2008. Prior to this, he had directed tournaments in Ashgabat, was the country's ITF junior tennis initiative coordinator, and had captained the Turkmenistan Davis Cup team. His period as captain saw Turkmenistan claim its first victories when, in 2008, they defeated Sri Lanka and Syria to claim a surprise fifth placing. His team achieved similar success in 2011 and 2012, with at least two tie wins being made each year. These victories saw Byashimov's team ascend thirty ranking places during his time as captain, coming from No. 91 to a high of No. 63. However, despite 2012 being the team's best year to date, he did not return as captain for 2013.
- Nelli Voynich took over as captain in 2013, and she continued the team's streak of at least two tie wins per year since 2008. However, despite the team only managing seventh place during her first and only outing as captain, she did see the team achieve their highest ranking so far of No. 53.

=== Statistical summary ===
Name	Career	Ties	W	L	%	Best Achievement	Best Player
Jenneta Halliyeva	2004–2005	7	0	7	0.00	2005 – 4th	Ummarahmat Hummetova
Gulcha Byashimov	2008–2012	13	7	6	53.85	2012 – 5th	Anastasiya Prenko
Nelli Voynich	2013–	5	2	3	40.00	2013 – 7th	Anastasiya Prenko

== Results ==
Tournament	2004	2005	2006	2007	2008	2009	2010	2011	2012	2013	2014	W–L
Fed Cup
Asia/Oceania Zone Group II	5th	4th	A	A	5th	A	A	5th	5th	7th		9–16
Win–loss	0–4	0–3			2–2			2–2	3–2	2–3		9–16
Year End Ranking	91=	92	91=	91=	75	76	81	74	64			

=== Records ===
The longest rubber involving a Turkmen player in terms of both time and number of games was Anastasiya Prenko's 2011, 4–6, 7–6^{(10–8)}, 6–4, defeat of Fatma Al Nabhani, which took two and a half hours and went over thirty-three games. The tie involving the rubber also holds the Turkmenistan Fed Cup record for longest tie in terms of time, at four and a half hours. The longest tie in terms of games, however, was a 2013 tie against Vietnam which involved sixty-seven games.

The Turkmenistan record for longest tiebreak was set in 2004, when then-captain Jenneta Halliyeva was defeated by Pacific Oceania's then-captain Gurianna Korinihona, 3–6, 6–7^{(14–16)}.

The largest margin of victory that Turkmenistan achieved was in a 2012 win over Iran, where the team won while only dropping six games across the three rubbers. However, Turkmenistan's largest margin of defeat occurred when the team lost to Uzbekistan after only winning two games.

The longest winning streak of the Turkmenistan Fed Cup team occurred when the team had two consecutive wins. This appeared twice in the team's history with both occasions featuring wins from the 2012 competition.

==== Longest winning streaks ====
Year	Competition	Date	Location	Opponent	Score	Result
2011	Asia/Oceania Zone, Group II, 5th–6th Play-off	5 February	Nonthaburi (THA)	Pakistan	2–1	Won
2012	Asia/Oceania Zone, Group II, Pool B	30 January	Shenzhen (CHN)	Oman	2–1	Won
2012	Asia/Oceania Zone, Group II, Pool B	1 February	Shenzhen (CHN)	India	0–3	Lost
2012	Asia/Oceania Zone, Group II, Pool B	3 February	Shenzhen (CHN)	Iran	3–0	Won
2012	Asia/Oceania Zone, Group II, 5th–6th Play-off	4 February	Shenzhen (CHN)	Singapore	3–0	Won
2013	Asia/Oceania Zone, Group II, Pool A	4 February	Astana (KAZ)	Hong Kong	0–3	Lost

=== Head-to-head record ===
Player	Record	W%	Hard	Clay	Grass	Carpet
Oman	2–0	100%	2–0	0–0	0–0	0–0
Singapore	2–3	40%	2–3	0–0	0–0	0–0
Iran	1–0	100%	1–0	0–0	0–0	0–0
Pakistan	1–0	100%	1–0	0–0	0–0	0–0
Sri Lanka	1–0	100%	1–0	0–0	0–0	0–0
Kazakhstan	1–1	50%	1–1	0–0	0–0	0–0
Syria	1–2	33.33%	1–2	0–0	0–0	0–0
India	0–1	0%	0–1	0–0	0–0	0–0

Player	Record	W%	Hard	Clay	Grass	Carpet
Kyrgyzstan	0–1	0%	0–1	0–0	0–0	0–0
New Zealand	0–1	0%	0–1	0–0	0–0	0–0
Pacific Oceania	0–1	0%	0–1	0–0	0–0	0–0
Uzbekistan	0–1	0%	0–1	0–0	0–0	0–0
Vietnam	0–1	0%	0–1	0–0	0–0	0–0
Hong Kong	0–2	0%	0–2	0–0	0–0	0–0
Philippines	0–2	0%	0–2	0–0	0–0	0–0

*Statistics as of 23 April 2013.

== See also ==
- Billie Jean King Cup
- Turkmenistan Davis Cup team
