= Oman Billie Jean King Cup team =

Omani tennis team

Oman
- ITF ranking: 95 ▼1 (16 November 2015)
- First year: 2011
- Years played: 2
- Ties played (W–L): 9 (3-6)
- Titles: 0
- Runners-up: 0
- Most total wins: Fatma Al Nabhani (9-6)
- Most singles wins: Fatma Al Nabhani (6-3)
- Most doubles wins: Fatma Al Nabhani (3-3)
- Best doubles team: Sarah Al Balushi & Fatma Al Nabhani (3-2)
- Most ties played: Fatma Al Nabhani (9)
- Most years played: Fatma Al Nabhani (2)

The Oman Fed Cup team represent Oman in Fed Cup tennis competition and are governed by the Oman Tennis Association. They have not competed since 2018.

== History ==
Oman competed in its first Fed Cup in 2011. Their best result have been the Asia / Oceania Group II 7th-8th Playoffs.

== See also ==
- Billie Jean King Cup
- Oman Davis Cup team
