= Abigail Guthrie =

New Zealand tennis player

- Country (sports): New Zealand
- Born: New Zealand
- Height: 1.70 m (5 ft 7 in)
- Plays: Right (two-handed backhand)
- Prize money: $5,464

Singles
- Career record: 6–7
- Career titles: 0
- Highest ranking: No. 1173 (12 August 2013)

Doubles
- Career record: 25–11
- Career titles: 2 ITF
- Highest ranking: No. 220 (11 August 2014)

Abigail "Abbey" Guthrie is a New Zealand former tennis player. On the Junior Circuit, she peaked at No. 360 in 2008. She and partner Kristi Boxx won two doubles titles on the ITF Women's Circuit in 2013.

== Career ==
Guthrie competed at the Auckland Open in the summer of 2012/2013. She also made her debut for the New Zealand Fed Cup team in 2013. She holds a 9–1 record in competition after the 2014 Asia/Oceania Group Round Robin Tournament in Astana, Kazakhstan. In 2014, again as a wildcard, she and partner Sacha Jones defeated second seeds Marina Erakovic and Cara Black in the first round.

== ITF Circuit finals ==
=== Doubles (2–3) ===
| Legend $25,000 tournaments $10,000 tournaments | Finals by surface Hard (2–2) Clay (0–1) |

| Result | No. | Date | Tournament | Surface | Partner | Opponents | Score |
|---|---|---|---|---|---|---|---|
| Win | 1. | 14 July 2013 | Sharm El Sheikh, Egypt | Hard | (United States) Kristi Boxx | (Russia) Anna Morgina (Hungary) Naomi Totka | 6–1, 6–2 |
| Loss | 1. | 10 August 2013 | İzmir, Turkey | Hard | (United States) Kristi Boxx | (Serbia) Aleksandra Krunić (Poland) Katarzyna Piter | 2–6, 2–6 |
| Loss | 2. | 5 October 2013 | Hilton Head, United States | Clay | (United States) Kristi Boxx | (United States) Alexandra Mueller (Canada) Jillian O'Neill | 4–6, 1–6 |
| Win | 2. | 13 October 2013 | Macon, United States | Hard | (United States) Kristi Boxx | (United States) Emily Harman (United States) Elizabeth Lumpkin | 3–6, 7–6^{(7–4)}, [10–4] |
| Loss | 3. | 27 October 2013 | Florence, United States | Hard | (United States) Kristi Boxx | (United States) Anamika Bhargava (United States) Madison Brengle | 5–7, 5–7 |
