= Vietnam Billie Jean King Cup team =

Vietnam
- Nations Ranking: 92 ▼3 (18 April 2016)
- Colors: red & white
- First year: 2013
- Years played: 5
- Ties played (W–L): 20 (10–10)
- Years in World Group: 0
- Best finish: Asia/Oceania Group II (2013, 2014)
- Most total wins: Sophia Tran Ngoc Nhi Huynh (8–7)
- Most singles wins: Trần Thị Tâm Hảo (5–3)
- Most doubles wins: Sophia Tran Ngoc Nhi Huynh (6-2)
- Best doubles team: Huỳnh Phi Khanh / Nguyễn Ái Ngọc Vân (2–1)
- Most ties played: Sophia Tran Ngoc Nhi Huynh (12)
- Most years played: Sophia Tran Ngoc Nhi Huynh (3)

The Vietnam Billie Jean King Cup team represents Vietnam in Billie Jean King Cup tennis competition and are governed by the Vietnam Tennis Federation.

== History ==
Vietnam competed in its first Fed Cup in 2013. They finished 5th in the Asia/Oceania Zone Group II round-robin and managed to secure a place in the group after beating Malaysia in the play-off match. The team continued to finish last in the Asia/Oceania Zone Group II group stage and defeated Iran in the play-offs.

== Players (2025) ==
- Thi Phuong Nguyen
- Thi Mai Linh Nguyen
- Hanh Hong Ngo
- Bao Ngan Ngo

== See also ==
- Billie Jean King Cup
- Vietnam Davis Cup team
