= Marian Capadocia =

Filipino tennis player (born 1995)

- Country (sports): Philippines
- Residence: Manila, Philippines
- Born: September 17, 1995 (age 31) San Jose de Buenavista, Antique, Philippines
- Plays: Right-handed (two-handed backhand)

Singles
- Career record: 16–17

Doubles
- Career record: 8–8
- Career titles: 1 ITF
Medal record
Women's Tennis
Representing Philippines
Southeast Asian Games
Bronze medal – third place	2011 Jakarta-Palembang	Team
Bronze medal – third place	2021 Vietnam	Team
- Last updated on: May 15, 2022.

Marian Jade Saldajeno Capadocia (born September 17, 1995) is a tennis and padel player from the Philippines.

== Early life and education ==
Marian Capadocia was born to Joenito and Charito Capadocia who were former tennis players. Capadocia graduated high school from the Mabini campus of the Arellano University. She put her studies on hold for three years later attending college at the Arellano University.

== Career ==
Capadocia is a nine-time PCA Open women's single champion from 2011 to 2014, 2017 to 2019, and 2023 to 2024. She also won a women's doubles title in 2012.

Trained at the Amstelpark Tennis Academy in the Netherlands, Capadocia also competes internationally for the Philippines and is a professional tennis player.

She has played in the SEA Games; winning two bronze medals in the women's team tennis event in the 2011 and 2021 editions. She along with Omani player Fatma Al-Nabhani, won the women's double event of the Bahrain ITF Futures Tournament in 2018.

Capadocia represented the Philippines at the 2017 Summer Universiade in Taipei. Though her participation was not recognized by the Philippine Tennis Association.

She was part of the Arellano Chiefs women's tennis team that finished as runners-up in 2017 at the NCAA tennis championships.

In late 2024, Capadocia took up padel and participated in the Asia Pacific Padel Tour (APPT) Grand Slam. While she clarified she has not retired from tennis yet she admitted to receiving lack of support as a tennis player. She took part in the 2025 APPT.

Capadocia returned to tennis in April 2026, taking part at the Philta Women's National Open after giving birth to a child.

== ITF finals ==
=== Doubles (1–0) ===
Legend $100,000 tournaments $75,000 tournaments $50,000 tournaments $25,000 tournaments $15,000 tournaments $10,000 tournaments	Finals by surface Hard (1–0) Clay (0–0) Grass (0–0) Carpet (0–0)

Result	No.	Date	Tournament	Surface	Partner	Opponents	Score
Winner	1.	24 March 2018	Manama, Bahrain	Hard	(Oman) Fatma Al-Nabhani	(Zimbabwe) Valeria Bhunu (United Kingdom) Emily Webley-Smith	7–5, 6–2
