= Aslina Chua =

Malaysian tennis player (born 1996)

- Full name: Aslina An Ping Chua
- Country (sports): Malaysia
- Born: 26 January 1996 (age 30) Kuching, Malaysia
- Plays: Right-handed (two-handed backhand)
- Prize money: $3,061

Singles
- Career record: 5–9
- Career titles: 0

Doubles
- Career record: 0–2
- Career titles: 0

Team competitions
- Fed Cup: 5–6

Aslina An Ping Chua (born 26 January 1996) is a Malaysian former tennis player.

Chua made her WTA Tour debut at the 2013 Malaysian Open, having received a wildcard into the main draw of the singles competition. She lost in the first round to Zhang Shuai, 0–6, 1–6. Chua also received a wildcard into the doubles event, partnering Yang Zi. However, they lost to the fourth seeds, Rika Fujiwara and Zheng Saisai in the first round, 5–7, 6–3, [4–10].

Playing for Malaysia at the Fed Cup, Chua has a win–loss record of 5–6.
