= Jahana Bayramova =

Turkmen tennis player

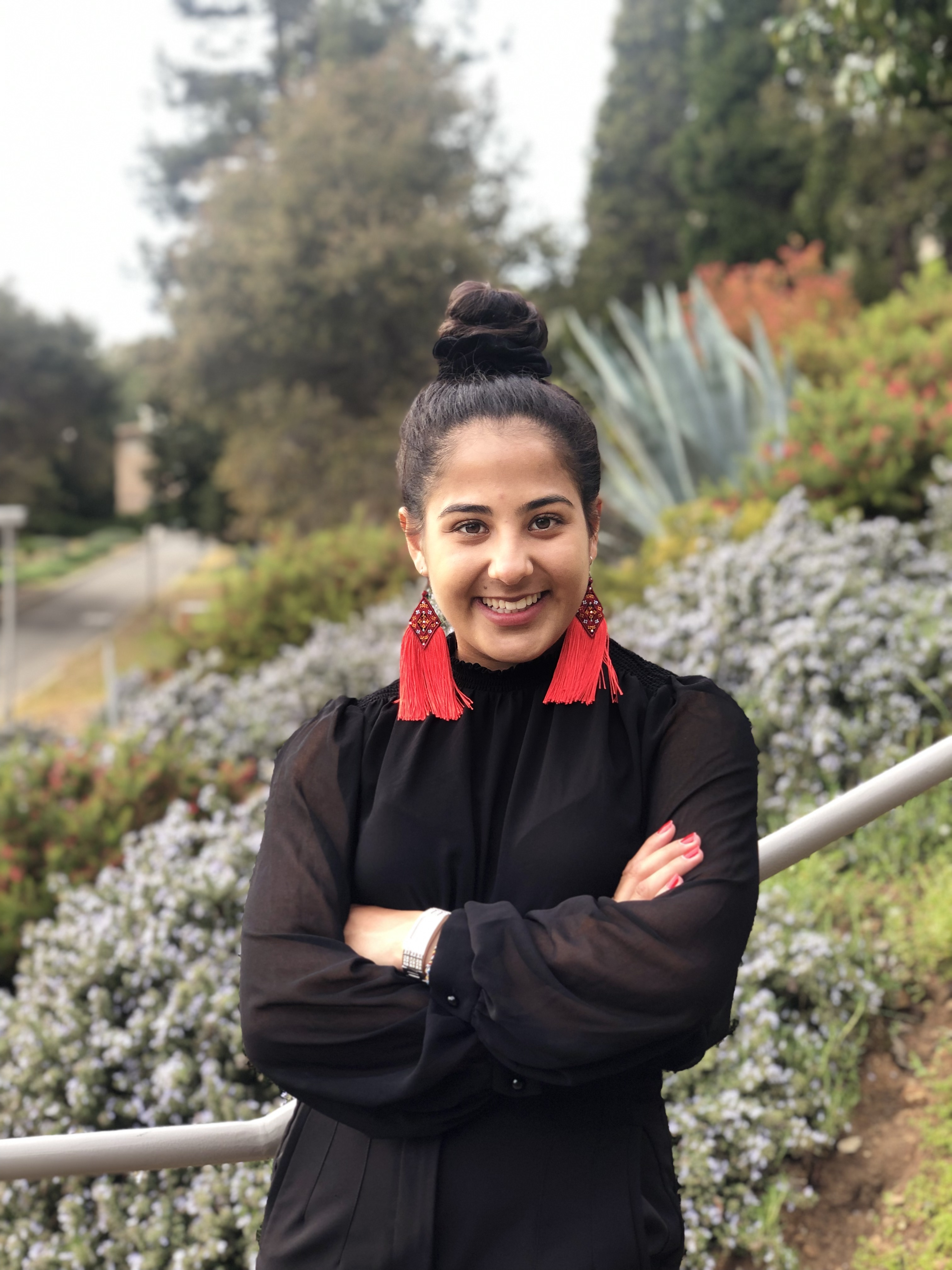
- Country (sports): Turkmenistan
- Residence: Dubai, UAE
- Born: 5 November 1997 (age 28) Ashgabat, Turkmenistan
- Height: 1.59 m (5 ft 3 in)
- Turned pro: 2013
- Plays: Right-handed (two-handed backhand)

Singles
- Career record: 5-8
- Career titles: 0
- Highest ranking: 568 ITF Juniors

Team competitions
- Fed Cup: 8–14
Medal record
Representing Turkmenistan
Islamic Games
Bronze medal – third place	2017 Baku	Team

Jahana Bayramova (Turkmen: Джахан Байрамова, Jahan Baÿramowa; pronounced [jahɘn bɘyramowa] born 5 November 1997 in Ashgabat) is a Turkmen female tennis player. Honoured Master of Sports of Turkmenistan since 2014.

Bayramova has captured one doubles title on the ITF tour in her junior career. She reached her best ITF world junior singles ranking of number 568 on 31 March 2014 and is currently ranked number 1 in Turkmenistan. She was also the former number 5 in Dubai, UAE in 2011. Bayramova was the winner of "Valencia Promesas" on October 10, 2011, in Spain. She also plays for Turkmenistan at the Fed Cup, and has debuted her first year in 2013. Bayramova has a total win–loss record of 8–14. She has also played for Turkmenistan at Asian Games in Incheon, South Korea from 19 September – 4 October 2014.

Bayramova represented Turkmenistan at 2017 Asian Indoor and Martial Arts Games, which is also counted as the 5th Asian Indoor Games, that was held in Ashgabat, Turkmenistan in 2017.

== Personal life ==
Bayramova was born on 5 November 1997 in Ashgabat, Turkmenistan and is the second child in the family. She developed her love for the sport from an early age and began playing tennis at the age of 8. She started her journey by joining the Olympic Stadium of Turkmenistan, where she was coached by Olga Babayan. Bayramova's inspiration has been her family. She is the only granddaughter of an Honored Artist of Turkmenistan Durdy Bayramov, who died in 2014 from cancer. Since then, Bayramova dedicates all her games to her grandfather.

At the age of 12, Bayramova moved to Villena, Spain, to attend JC Ferrero Equelite Sport Academy where she has been gaining experience until 2015. In January 2016, Bayramova has been admitted to the Holy Names University in Oakland, California.

Bayramova graduated from the Holy Names University in December 2019, with a Bachelors of Arts in Sports Management and Minor in Psychology. She played on the Holy Names University women's tennis team from 2016 to 2019.

Upon graduation, Bayramova moved to Toronto, Canada.

She currently resides in Dubai, UAE where Bayramova started working as a high- performance tennis coach at Zayed Abbas Tennis Academy located at the Emirates Golf Club.

== Career ==
Bayramova achieved her best career result by bringing Turkmenistan a bronze medal in the team competition at the 4th Islamic Solidarity Games in Baku, Azerbaijan in 2017 by defeating Umayra Hashimova by dropping only three games with the final score 6/2 6/1.

== College career ==
Bayramova attended and played tennis for Holy Names University in California. In 2016, Bayramova missed a year due to L5, S1 back injury. Upon returning to the court, she confidently performed on the Hawks Team. In March 2017, Bayramova was ranked No. 15 Division 2 by the Intercollegiate Tennis Association (ITA) West Region.

Bayramova ended her 2016–17 sophomore season with a 6–9 record, playing no. 1 singles. Bayramova was the first female athlete in the history of Holy Names University to receive PacWest postseason athletic honors. That same year, Bayramova was named the HNU's Female Student-Athlete of the Year as well as received Academic All-PacWest. She received the Third Team All-PacWest Singles award along with other awards.

Bayramova ended her 2017–18 junior season with a 7–13 in singles and 7–18 in doubles record, playing no. 1 singles and doubles. She received the Team Leadership Award, Intercollegiate Tennis Association (ITA) Scholar-Athlete Award as well as the Academic All-PacWest award.

She ended her 2018–19 senior season with a 10–9 in singles and 14–13 in doubles record, mostly playing no. 1 singles and doubles. She received Intercollegiate Tennis Association (ITA) Scholar-Athlete Award as well as the Academic All-PacWest award. Bayramova was recognized as West Region Arthur Ashe Leadership & Sportsmanship Award for her accomplishments on and off the court.

== Awards and recognition ==
- Honoured Master of Sports of Turkmenistan (2014)
- Third Team All-PacWest Singles (2017)
- ITA Scholar Athlete Award (2017–2018)
- Academic All-PacWest (2018–2019)
- ITA West Region Arthur Ashe Leadership and Sportsmanship Award (2018)
- Kappa Gamma Pi Graduate Honor (2020)

== ITF Junior Finals ==
Grand Slam
Category GA
Category G1
Category G2
Category G3
Category G4
Category G5

=== Singles Finals (0–1) ===
Outcome	No.	Date	Tournament	Surface	Opponent	Score
Runner-up	1.	21 September 2013	Ashgabat, Turkmenistan	Hard	(Russia) Anastasia Gasanova	3–6, 4–6

=== Doubles finals (1–2) ===
Outcome	No.	Date	Tournament	Surface	Partner	Opponents in the final	Score in the final
Runner-up	1.	23 June 2013	Carthage, Tunisia	Clay	(Czech Republic) Natálie Novotná	(Belgium) Juliette Bastin (United States) Megan Horn	6–7^{(5)}, 4–6
Winner	2.	21 September 2013	Ashgabat, Turkmenistan	Hard	(Turkey) Berfu Cengiz	(Russia) Anastasia Gasanova (Russia) Melissa Ifidzhen	6–2, 6–2
Runner-up	3.	28 September 2013	Ashgabat, Turkmenistan	Hard	(Russia) Melissa Ifidzhen	(Russia) Anastasia Gasanova (Russia) Sofiya Esterman	0–6, 3–6
