= Katherine Ip =

Hong Kong tennis player

- Country (sports): Hong Kong
- Born: 17 September 1995 (age 30) San Francisco, California, U.S.
- Prize money: $16,885

Singles
- Career record: 56–42
- Career titles: 2 ITF
- Highest ranking: 662 (4 November 2013)

Grand Slam singles results
- Australian Open Junior: 2R (2013)
- French Open Junior: 1R (2013)
- Wimbledon Junior: 2R (2013)
- US Open Junior: 1R (2013)

Doubles
- Career record: 23–30
- Career titles: 2 ITF
- Highest ranking: 543 (16 October 2017)

Grand Slam doubles results
- Australian Open Junior: 2R (2013)
- French Open Junior: 1R (2013)
- Wimbledon Junior: 1R (2013)
- US Open Junior: 2R (2013)

Team competitions
- Fed Cup: 11–2

Katherine Cheng Ip (Chinese: 葉澄; born 17 September 1995) is an American-born former Hong Kong tennis player.

== Early career and education ==
Ip was ranked as high as 35 in the world in juniors and is one of the few tennis players in Hong Kong to have participated in all four junior Grand Slam tournaments. She won two singles titles and two doubles titles on the ITF Circuit. In November 2013, she reached her highest WTA singles ranking of 662. In October 2017, she reached her best doubles ranking of world No. 543.

Ip had graduated from Rice University in Houston, Texas (class of 2017) with a 4.0 GPA. At Rice, she played tennis for the Owls. Ip was the third player in program's history to earn an All-American status when she won a pair of matches at the NCAA Division 1 Tennis Championship. She is an external vice president for the Hong Kong Students' Association. She organizes events and maintains the budget of the Hong Kong Student Association.

Playing for Hong Kong in Fed Cup, Ip has a win–loss record of 11–2.

She made her WTA Tour main-draw debut at the 2016 Hong Kong Open in doubles, partnering Eudice Chong.

== ITF Circuit finals ==
=== Singles: 3 (2 titles, 1 runner-up) ===
Legend $100,000 tournaments $75,000 tournaments $50,000 tournaments $25,000 tournaments $10,000 tournaments	Finals by surface Hard (2–1) Clay (0–0) Grass (0–0) Carpet (0–0)

Result	No.	Date	Tournament	Surface	Opponent	Score
Win	1.	1 December 2012	ITF Kolkata, India	Hard	(India) Rishika Sunkara	2–6, 6–3, 6–3
Win	2.	19 August 2013	ITF New Delhi, India	Hard	(India) Shweta Rana	6–3, 6–3
Loss	3.	27 July 2014	ITF New Delhi	Hard	(South Korea) Kim Da-bin	1–6, 3–6

=== Doubles: 4 (2 titles, 2 runner-ups) ===
Legend $100,000 tournaments $75,000 tournaments $50,000 tournaments $25,000 tournaments $15,000 tournaments $10,000 tournaments	Finals by surface Hard (2–2) Clay (0–0) Grass (0–0) Carpet (0–0)

Result	No.	Date	Tournament	Surface	Partner	Opponents	Score
Loss	1.	25 July 2015	ITF Hong Kong, China S.A.R.	Hard	(Hong Kong) Eudice Chong	(South Korea) Choi Ji-hee (South Korea) Lee So-ra	2–6, 2–6
Win	1.	10 July 2016	ITF Gimcheon, South Korea	Hard	(Indonesia) Jessy Rompies	(South Korea) Kim Hae-sung (South Korea) Kim Mi-ok	6–3, 6–3
Win	2.	15 July 2016	ITF Hong Kong	Hard	(Hong Kong) Eudice Chong	(Australia) Alexandra Bozovic (Australia) Kaylah McPhee	6–2, 6–2
Loss	2.	24 June 2017	ITF Taipei, Taiwan	Hard	(Hong Kong) Eudice Chong	(Chinese Taipei) Cho I-hsuan (Chinese Taipei) Cho Yi-tsen	2–6, 3–6
