= Anastasiya Prenko =

Turkmen tennis player

- Country (sports): Turkmenistan
- Born: 12 March 1993 (age 33) Ashgabat, Turkmenistan
- Height: 1.79 m (5 ft 10 in)
- Prize money: $9,955

Singles
- Career record: 31–37
- Career titles: 0
- Highest ranking: No. 536 (3 May 2010)

Doubles
- Career record: 22–23
- Career titles: 1 ITF
- Highest ranking: No. 529 (24 October 2011)

Team competitions
- Fed Cup: 24–15
Medal record
Women's tennis
Representing Turkmenistan
Islamic Solidarity Games
Bronze medal – third place	2017 Baku	Women's Team

Anastasiya Prenko (born 12 March 1993) is a former professional tennis player from Turkmenistan. She is the former Turkmenistan No. 1.

Prenko has won one doubles title on the ITF Circuit. On 3 May 2010, she achieved her career-high singles ranking of world No. 536. On 24 October 2011, she peaked at No. 529 in the doubles rankings.

Prenko won bronze medal at the 2017 Islamic Solidarity Games at the women's team event.

Playing for Turkmenistan in Fed Cup, Prenko has a win–loss record of 24–15.

== ITF finals ==
=== Doubles: 4 (1 title, 3 runner-ups) ===
Legend $100,000 tournaments $75,000 tournaments $50,000 tournaments $25,000 tournaments $10,000 tournaments	Finals by surface Hard (1–2) Clay (0–1) Grass (0–0) Carpet (0–0)

Result	W–L	Date	Tournament	Tier	Surface	Partner	Opponents	Score
Loss	0–1	Apr 2010	ITF Almaty, Kazakhstan	10,000	Hard (i)	(Kyrgyzstan) Ksenia Palkina	(Russia) Eugeniya Pashkova (Russia) Maria Zharkova	6–3, 6–7^{(9)}, [7–10]
Win	1–1	Mar 2011	ITF Astana, Kazakhstan	10,000	Hard (i)	(Russia) Ekaterina Yashina	(Russia) Nadezda Gorbachkova (Russia) Ekaterina Pushkareva	6–4, 7–5
Loss	1–2	Jul 2011	ITF Fergana, Uzbekistan	25,000	Hard	(United States) Elizaveta Nemchinov	(Uzbekistan) Nigina Abduraimova (Uzbekistan) Albina Khabibulina	3–6, 3–6
Loss	1–3	Sep 2011	ITF Tbilisi, Georgia	10,000	Clay	(Belarus) Viktoria Yemialyanava	(Georgia (country)) Sofia Kvatsabaia (Georgia (country)) Tatia Mikadze	1–6, 3–6
