= New Zealand Billie Jean King Cup team =

New Zealand national women's tennis team

New Zealand
- Captain: Matt Hair
- ITF ranking: 80 ▼5 (18 April 2016)
- Colors: white & black
- First year: 1965
- Years played: 42
- Ties played (W–L): 133 (58–75)
- Years in World Group: 23 (10–23)
- Best finish: World Group QF (1965, 1971)
- Most total wins: Leanne Baker (34–32)
- Most singles wins: Marina Erakovic (18–7)
- Most doubles wins: Leanne Baker (23–15)
- Best doubles team: Julie Richardson / Belinda Cordwell (7–4)
- Most ties played: Leanne Baker (48)
- Most years played: Leanne Baker (12)

The New Zealand Billie Jean King Cup team represents New Zealand in the Billie Jean King Cup tennis competition. It is governed by Tennis New Zealand.

== History ==
A New Zealand team first competed in the Fed Cup in 1965. Its best results have been World Group quarter-finals in 1965 and 1971.

Due to a late withdrawal from a competition in 2011, New Zealand were banned from competing in the 2012 Fed Cup.

New Zealand chose to not enter a team in the 2015 and 2016 Fed Cups because they feared their team wouldn't be competitive.

== Current team (2024) ==
- Monique Barry
- Paige Hourigan
- Valentina Ivanov
- Erin Routliffe
- Lulu Sun

Captain Matt Hair (AUS)

== Past teams (2023) ==
- Erin Routliffe
- Monique Barry
- Jade Otway
- Vivian Yang

Captain Matt Hair (AUS)

== See also ==
- Billie Jean King Cup
- New Zealand Davis Cup team
- New Zealand at the Hopman Cup
- Tennis New Zealand
