= Zarina Diyas =

Kazakh tennis player (born 1993)

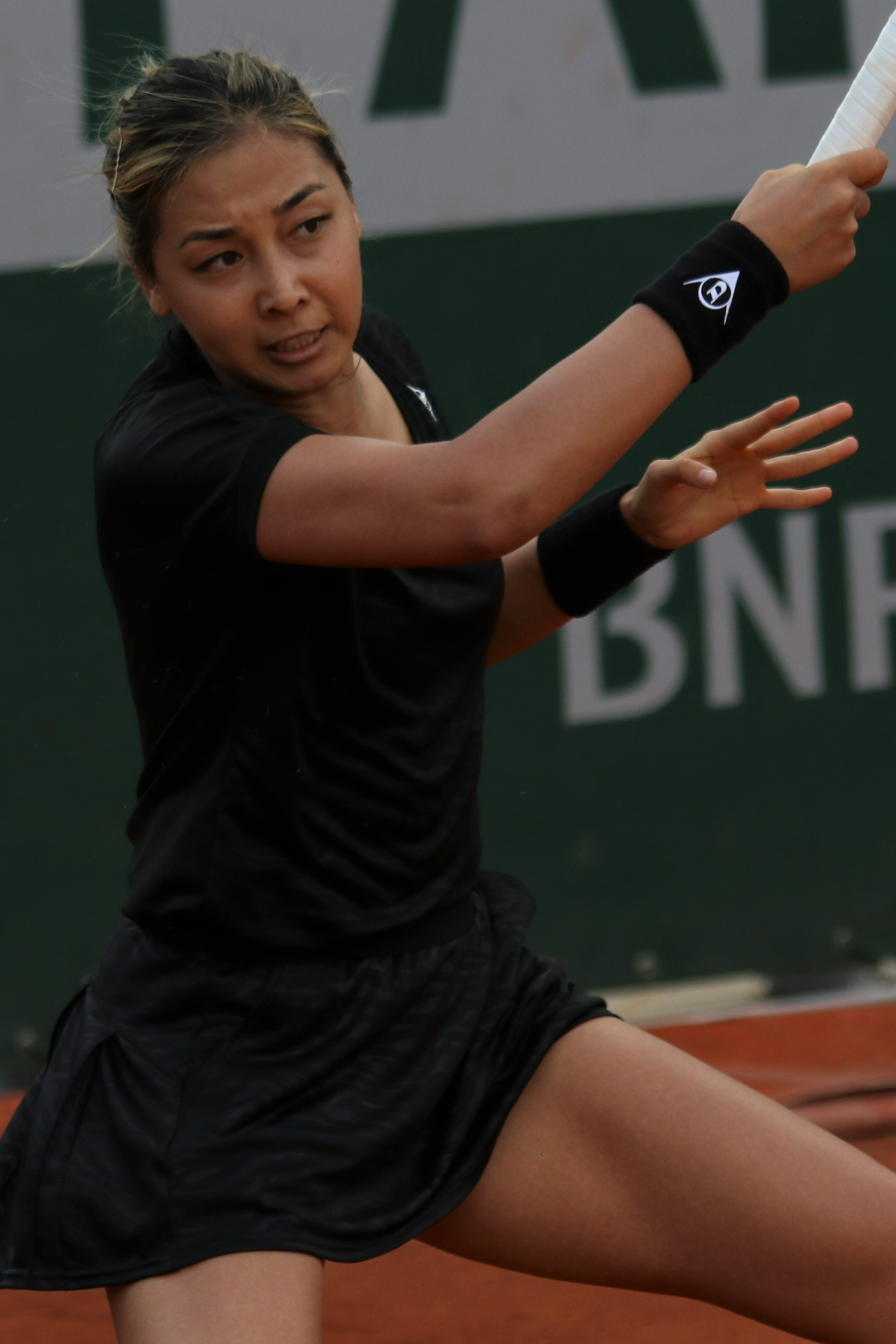
- Diyas at the 2022 French Open
- Native name: Зарина Диас
- Country (sports): Kazakhstan
- Residence: Almaty, Kazakhstan
- Born: 18 October 1993 (age 33) Almaty
- Height: 1.72 m (5 ft 8 in)
- Turned pro: 2007
- Retired: 2026
- Plays: Right (two-handed backhand)
- Coach: Ernest Zurabyan, Roberto Antonini, Carlo Bilardo (2016-2020)
- Prize money: $3,917,584

Singles
- Career record: 386–273
- Career titles: 1
- Highest ranking: No. 31 (12 January 2015)

Grand Slam singles results
- Australian Open: 3R (2014, 2015, 2020, 2021)
- French Open: 2R (2015, 2016, 2018, 2019, 2021)
- Wimbledon: 4R (2014, 2015)
- US Open: 3R (2014)

Other tournaments
- Olympic Games: 1R (2021)

Doubles
- Career record: 32–44
- Career titles: 0
- Highest ranking: No. 89 (8 June 2015)

Grand Slam doubles results
- Australian Open: 2R (2015, 2018)
- French Open: 2R (2015, 2021)
- Wimbledon: 2R (2014, 2021)
- US Open: QF (2014)

Team competitions
- Fed Cup: 20–8

Zarina Diyas (Kazakh: Зарина Диас; Russian: Зари́на Ди́яс; born 18 October 1993) is a Kazakh former tennis player. She reached a career-high of 31 in the singles rankings by the WTA. Diyas won one singles title on the WTA Tour, at the Japan Women's Open, along with 12 singles titles on the ITF Women's Circuit.

Diyas mostly played on the ITF Circuit until 2014, her breakthrough season. Having started the year outside the top 150, she progressed into the top 40 by September, allowing her to enter tournaments on the WTA Tour more consistently, although she still plays ITF tournaments. She is one of the most successful female tennis players representing Kazakhstan, along with Elena Rybakina and Yulia Putintseva.

Diyas became a member of the Kazakhstan Fed Cup team in 2011 and has played for eleven years, second only to Yulia Putintseva.

== Early life ==
Zarina Diyas (Kazakh: Зари́на Ди́ас, romanized: Zarina Dīas) was born on 18 October 1993 in Almaty. Her mother is Aida Aulbekova, and she has a sister named Alissa. During her childhood, Diyas spent many years in the Czech Republic, having moved there with her mother and sister when she was five years old. Her mother introduced her to tennis at age six. Around 2010, she played as a member of a tennis club in Prague. She had a chance to acquire Czech citizenship but decided to continue playing for Kazakhstan. She lived in the Czech Republic until she was 12 years old, before moving to Guangzhou, China for much of her tennis training. She later started studying psychology at university, remotely.

== Juniors ==
Diyas reached a career-high ranking of No. 17 as a junior. She began playing on the ITF Junior Circuit in January 2007 at the age of 13. In July of that same year, she won a low-level Grade-4 title at the Safina Cup in the singles event, defeating Petra Krejsová in the final. She made her doubles debut at the same tournament, losing in the second round alongside Yuliana Umanets. She then continued to have good performances, reaching one semi-final and one final by the end of the year. The next year, she started with a strong result, winning the Grade 1 tournament Czech International Junior Indoor Championships, at her first event of the year. In March 2008, she won her first doubles title at Grade 2 level Luxembourg Indoor Junior Open, partnering with Ksenia Lykina.

In June 2008, she made her debut at the French Open, recording her first match-win at a Grand Slam tournament over Irina-Camelia Begu, before she was defeated by Lykina in the second round. She also made her doubles major debut there, losing in the first round. Diyas then reached the second round at Wimbledon. On her debut at the 2008 US Open and the 2009 Australian Open, she was eliminated in the first round. In June 2009, she played the French Open, her final junior tournament in both singles and doubles, where she reached the third round in singles, and lost in the first round in doubles.

== Professional ==
=== 2007–09: First steps ===
Diyas began playing on the ITF Women's Circuit in 2007 at the age of 14. Her first attempt to play in a main draw of a professional tournament was at a $100k event in Bratislava, where she lost in the first round of qualifying. In April 2008, she received a wildcard for playing in qualification at the Prague Open but failed to qualify after a first-round loss to Klaudia Jans. She then made her main-draw debut at the $25k event in Astana where she also won her first title.

At her first two appearances in 2009, she reached a quarterfinal, before winning another ITF title at the $25k event in Stuttgart. She then made her WTA Tour singles debut at Prague as a wildcard player, where she marked her first WTA Tour win and first quarterfinal. She defeated qualifier Kristina Mladenovic and sixth seed Petra Kvitová but later was eliminated by third-seeded Iveta Benešová. The year of 2009 was important for Diyas, as she made her first appearance at a major tournament in qualifying at the US Open, although she lost to Chang Kai-chen in the first round of qualifying.

=== 2010: First top 10 win, top 200 ===
In 2010, she continued to rise up the rankings, debuting in the top 200 in July. Following mixed results for the first half of the year, she reached the final at the $25k event in Rome, losing to Patricia Mayr-Achleitner. In October 2010, she left a mark at the Premier-level Kremlin Cup in Moscow qualifying into the main draw and defeating world No. 49, Gisela Dulko, in the first round. In the second, she achieved the biggest win of her career by defeating top seed and world No. 7, Jelena Janković, before losing by wide margin to Maria Kirilenko in the quarterfinal match.

=== 2011–12: Fall in rankings, shoulder surgery ===
During 2011, Diyas had mostly modest results, and did not progress significantly. Her most notable finish was a final at the $25k Kunming event which she lost to Iryna Brémond. She then reached semifinals at the $50k event in Wenshan but did not advance to another quarterfinal for the remainder of the year. On the WTA Tour, she won only one match, defeating Sun Shengnan in the first round of the Guangzhou International Open; before losing in the following round to Petra Martić.

In late 2011, Diyas underwent shoulder surgery and did not play tennis for the next seven months, causing her to fall in the rankings to outside the top 300. In May of the following year, she made her return on the ITF Circuit at the Kangaroo Cup where she failed to qualify for the main draw. A month later, she won her third ITF title at the $25k event in Bukhara, without dropping a set during the entire tournament. Later that year, she was advanced to the final of a $25k event in Taipei, where she lost to Zheng Saisai. The next week, she participated in a new WTA Challenger event, also in Taipei. In the first round, she defeated the world No. 40 and top seed, Peng Shuai, in straight sets. Then, in the following round, she recorded a lopsided win over Varatchaya Wongteanchai, losing just one game. However, in the following round, she lost to Kurumi Nara, marking her last quarterfinal of the season.

=== 2013: Back in the top 200 ===
Diyas started season primarily playing in qualifying draws for WTA tournaments. She began the year ranked world No. 264 and finished more than 100 spots higher. In February, she recorded her first win on the WTA Tour in 2013, prevailing over Kristýna Plíšková in the first round of the Malaysian Open. In the second round, she was eliminated by Ashleigh Barty. She then returned to the ITF Circuit, achieving mostly modest results. Her only ITF title of the year came in October at the $25k event in Makinohara, where she defeated rising Swiss junior and future top-ten player Belinda Bencic to clinch victory. She then advanced to another ITF Circuit final at the Caesar & Imperial Cup in Taipei but lost to Paula Kania in straight sets.

=== 2014: Breakthrough and top 50 ===
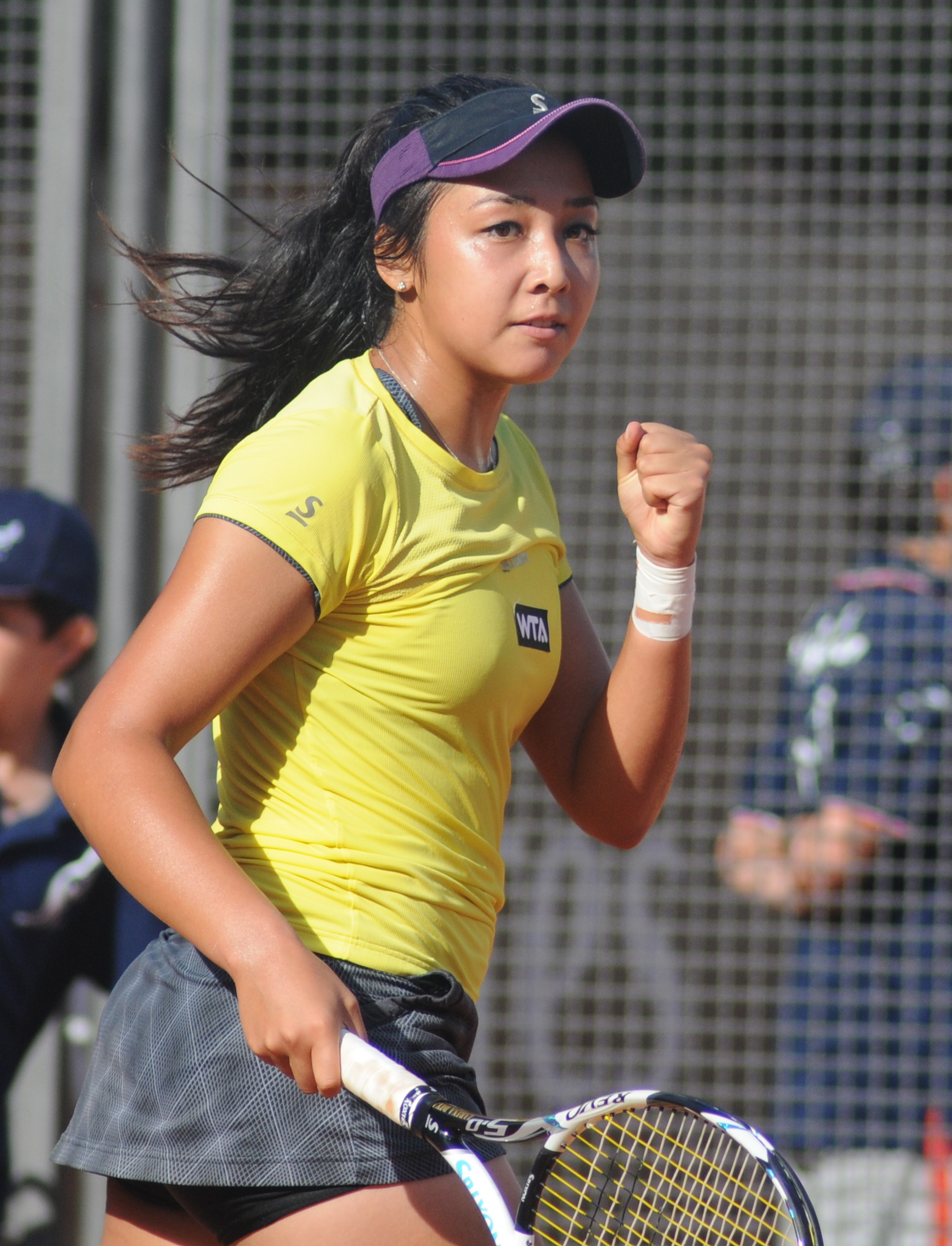
Diyas at the 2014 Italian Open

The 2014 season was Diyas's breakthrough year. First, she played at the $25k event in Hong Kong, reaching the final, in which she lost to Elizaveta Kulichkova. Then, she entered Australian Open qualifying, registering a close three-set win over Aleksandra Krunić in the first round. She then defeated Andreea Mitu, and Canadian Stéphanie Dubois, resulting in her first Grand Slam championship main-draw entry. In the first round, she then beat fellow qualifier Kateřina Siniaková, before she breezed past world No. 52, Marina Erakovic, to book her place in the third round, where she was defeated by world No. 11, Simona Halep, in straight sets. Nevertheless, her two early-round wins helped boost her ranking to a then-career-high No. 112. Following the Australian Open, Diyas lost qualifying matches at the Pattaya Open and the Qatar Ladies Open, before bouncing back to win a $50k event in Quanzhou.

She then traveled to the United States to compete at the Miami Open, qualifying for the main draw and getting past Alexandra Cadanțu in the first round before losing to Sloane Stephens in the second round. Although she failed to qualify for the Charleston Open, she played at the Malaysian Open and advanced to the quarterfinals – her first WTA Tour quarterfinal since the 2010 Kremlin Cup. Diyas then went to Europe but lost early in the first two tournaments contested. At Strasbourg, she returned to form with a first-round win over world No. 22, Kirsten Flipkens. She followed it up by dispatching Ajla Tomljanović before having to retire in her quarterfinal match against Christina McHale during the second set. Holding a world ranking of No. 86, Diyas was granted a spot in the main draw of the French Open but a difficult draw saw her knocked out by fourth seed Petra Kvitová in the first round. At the ITF grass-court tournament Nottingham Trophy, she advanced to the final but was narrowly beaten by Kristýna Plíšková. She played one more grass-court event at the before entering Wimbledon, at the Birmingham Classic, where she was eliminated by CoCo Vandeweghe in the first round. She record her first ever Wimbledon victory by defeating Kristina Mladenovic in a rain-delayed straight-sets match. Diyas then recorded three-set wins against 15th seed Carla Suárez Navarro and 2010 Wimbledon finalist Vera Zvonareva, before losing in straight sets to third seed Simona Halep in the fourth round.

In late July, she returned to the United States to compete at the Washington Open, where she reached the second round. Then, at the Cincinnati Open, she advanced to another second round, losing there to Lucie Šafářová.

Then, in her best result at the US Open to date, the unseeded Diyas advanced to the women's singles third round where she lost in straight sets to 17th seed Ekaterina Makarova, earning $105,090. There, she also played in the doubles event, where reached her first major quarterfinal alongside Xu Yifan.

In Asia, she reached the second round of the Wuhan Open and the China Open, losing to Angelique Kerber in both matches. After that, Diyas reached her first WTA Tour final at the Japan Women's Open where she lost to Samantha Stosur in straight sets. Her results helped her rise into the top 50, and she finished year as world No. 34.

=== 2015: Great start, second-half slump ===
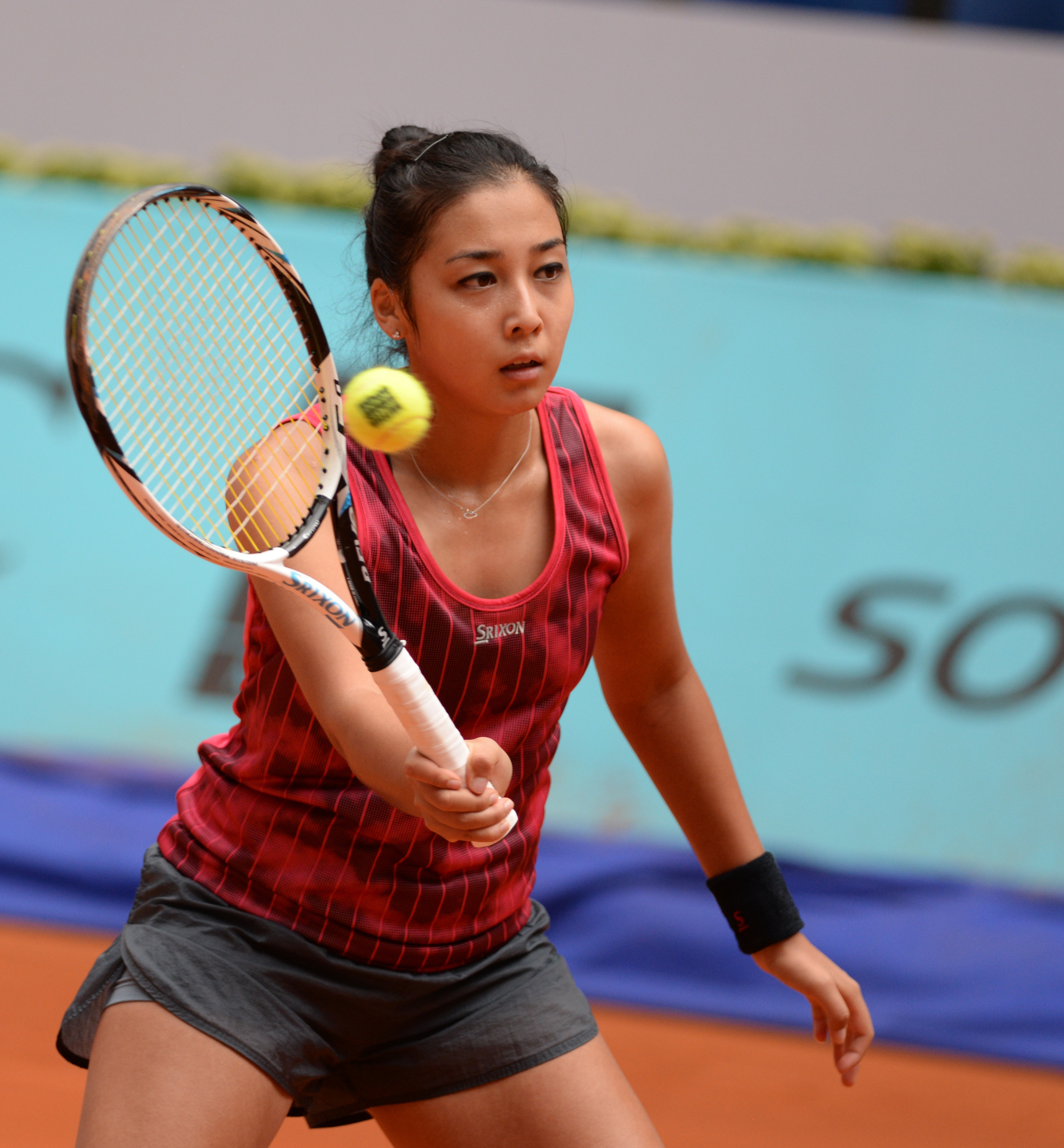
Diyas in 2015

Diyas came to the Shenzhen Open as part of Australian Open warm-up, where she got to the quarterfinal, losing to Zheng Saisai. Next week, she made another quarterfinal at the Hobart International, where Alison Riske stopped her from progressing further. Diyas was seeded 31st in singles at the Australian Open. She beat qualifier Urszula Radwańska of Poland in three sets in the first round and then unseeded Slovak Anna Karolína Schmiedlová in the second round in three sets, but she lost her third-round match against No. 2 seed and eventual finalist Maria Sharapova, in straight sets. Diyas also played doubles with South African Chanelle Scheepers, and they advanced to the second round, before losing to the 16th-seeded German team of Julia Görges and Anna-Lena Grönefeld, in straight sets.

In February, she traveled to Asia, playing at first in Pattaya at the Thailand Open, where she lost at the beginning of the tournament. At the Dubai Tennis Championships, a Premier 5 tournament, she won against two German players, Annika Beck and Andrea Petkovic, before she lost to Ekaterina Makarova in the next round. At the Qatar Ladies Open, she defeated Ons Jabeur in the first round, but Petkovic avenged her early Dubai exit by beating Diyas in the second round. At the Indian Wells Open, she got a bye in the first round for being seed No. 28. In the next round, she beat Donna Vekić before losing to Serena Williams. At the Miami Open, she also got a bye but lost in the second round to CiCi Bellis.

At the beginning of the clay-court season, she lost in round one of the Charleston Open. Diyas followed up this performance by making double-bagel against Sabine Lisicki in the first round of the Premier-level Stuttgart Open but later did not make it to the quarterfinal, losing to Sara Errani. At the Premier Mandatory Madrid Open, she lost in round one to Carla Suárez Navarro. At the Italian Open she beat Tsvetana Pironkova, before losing to No. 6 seed Eugenie Bouchard. She finished clay season with playing at the French Open as 32nd seed and defeated qualifier Dinah Pfizenmaier in the first round in straight sets, but lost to Alison Van Uytvanck in the following round.

Prior to Wimbledon, Diyas was defeated by lower-ranked players in two warm-up tournaments, losing to 129th-ranked Sachia Vickery at the Nottingham Open and to 146th-ranked Johanna Konta at the Eastbourne International. Diyas, however, reached the round of 16 at Birmingham by defeating Kateryna Bondarenko in straight sets and through the withdrawal of Victoria Azarenka. Diyas subsequently lost to 12th-ranked Karolína Plíšková. Despite the slow start on grass that left her unseeded at Wimbledon, Diyas managed to advance to the fourth round for the second consecutive year. She beat 24th seed Flavia Pennetta, qualifier Aliaksandra Sasnovich and 14th seed Andrea Petkovic. However, her stealthy run at Wimbledon was ended by the fourth seed Sharapova.

On her hardcourt season, Diyas failed to win in all her pre-US Open tournaments. At Washington, she had to retire against Lauren Davis, after trailing a set and 2–1 down. She lost to lucky loser Julia Görges at the Canadian Open, to Venus Williams at the Cincinnati Open and to Irina-Camelia Begu at the Connecticut Open – all in the first round. In the first round of the US Open, Diyas was defeated by Polona Hercog, so she failed to repeat her third-round appearance from the previous year.

At the Japan Women's Open, she defeated Kiki Bertens in the first round, her last win of the 2015 season. In the second round, she lost to Magda Linette. In her next three tournaments, she suffered first-round losses, to Madison Brengle at the Pan Pacific Open, to Irina-Camelia Begu at the Wuhan Open and to Monica Puig at the China Open. Diyas finished the year ranked No. 52.

=== 2016: Wrist injury ===
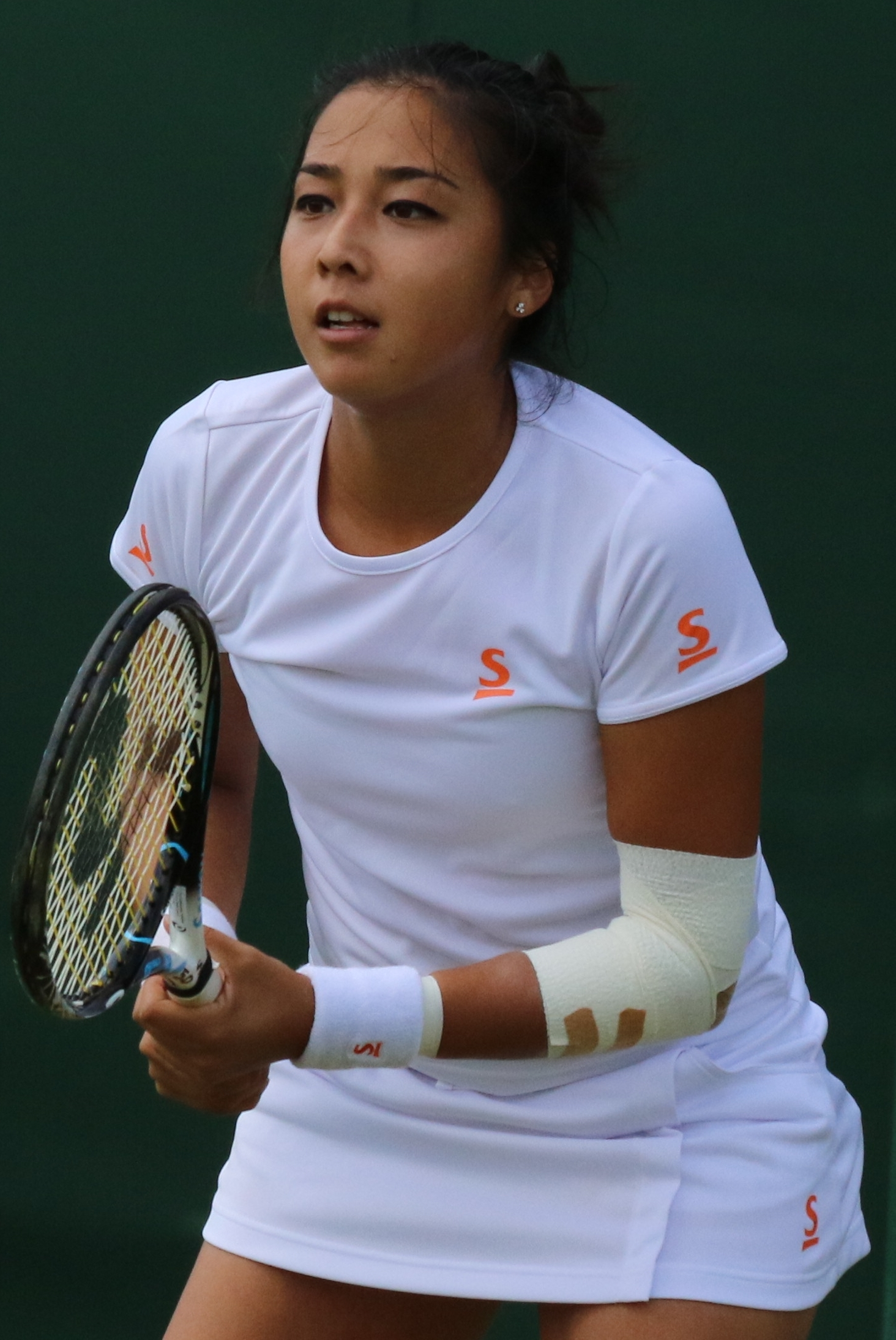
Diyas at the 2016 Wimbledon Championships

Diyas started the year playing at the Shenzhen Open, where she recorded her first win of the season against qualifier Zhang Kailin. In the second round, she was eliminated by Kateřina Siniaková. In her next two tournaments, she lost in the first round, at the Hobart International to Camila Giorgi and at the Australian Open to Madison Keys. At Doha, she was eliminated by Jeļena Ostapenko.

In March, she traveled to the United States, where her first event was the Indian Wells Open. She beat Jamie Loeb but could not beat Azarenka in the second round. At Miami, she defeated Olga Govortsova and Daria Gavrilova and went one round further, where Serena Williams eliminated her from the tournament. On clay, she reached two second rounds: the Internationaux de Strasbourg, where she lost to Alla Kudryavtseva, and the French Open, where she lost to Simona Halep.

Diyas suffered a wrist injury in round one of Wimbledon losing to Anna-Lena Friedsam. Later she underwent surgery. She did not play in any tournaments in 2016 after that. As a result, she fell out of the top 100.

=== 2017: Return & first WTA Tour title ===
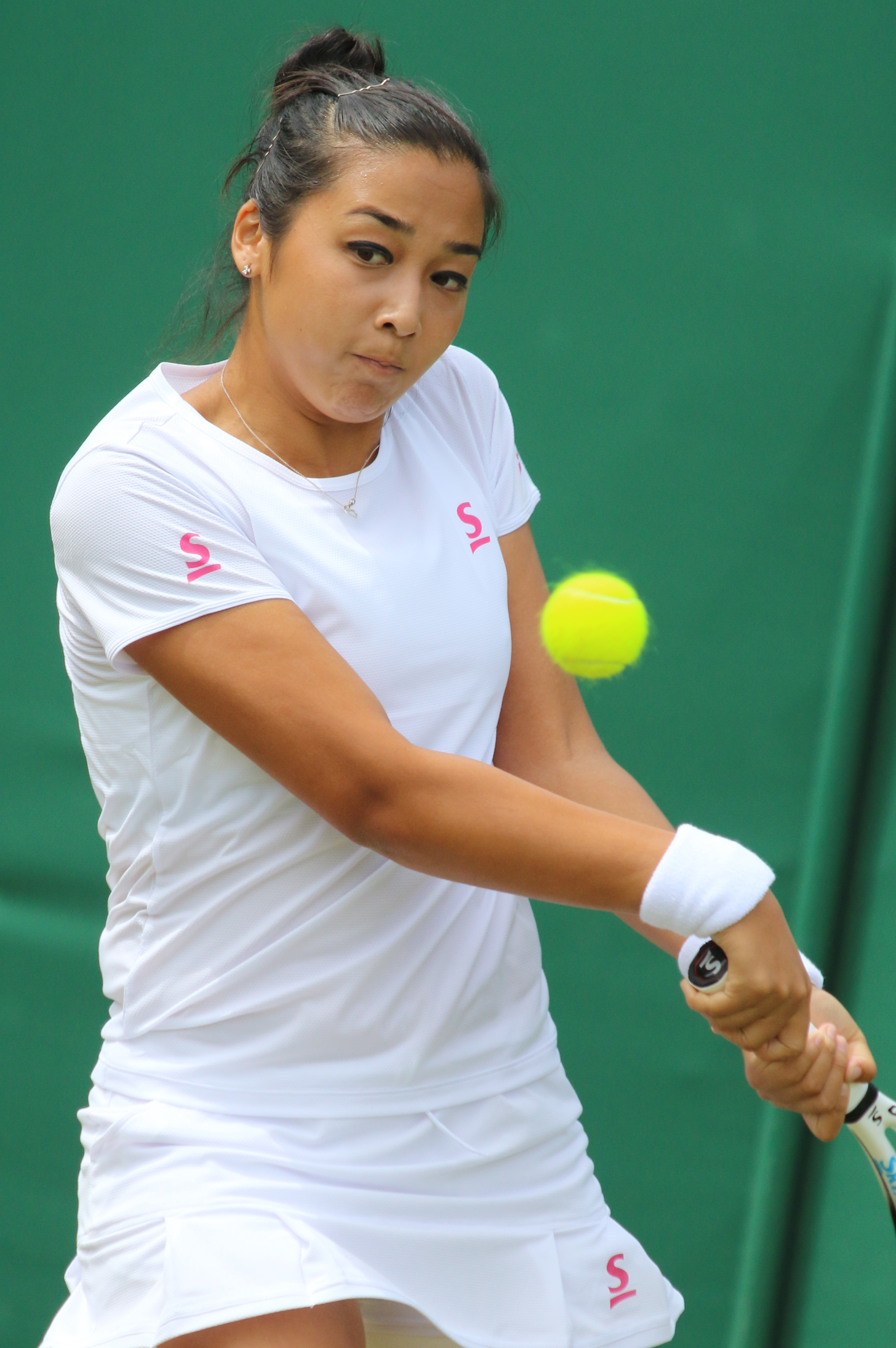
Diyas at the 2017 Wimbledon

Her attempt to return from her injury started with a series of losses. She lost in the opening rounds of her first four tournaments of the season before scoring her first wins at the Blossom Cup in Quanzhou, reaching the quarterfinals and losing to Zheng. Then, she won her first ITF title since June 2014 at a $25k tournament in Nanning. The following week, she managed to reach the quarterfinals of the WTA 125 Zhengzhou Open but then lost to the top seed Peng Shuai. Her next stop was the $100k tournament, the Kunming Open in Anning, where she reached the final but lost to Zheng again. She then came to Japan to play at the $80k Kangaroo Cup in Gifu but did not do well, losing to Luksika Kumkhum in the first round. Things get better in the following week, when she was advanced to the semifinals of the $60k Fukuoka International but lost to Magdaléna Rybáriková. Diyas then failed to qualify for the main draw of the French Open as she lost to Bethanie Mattek-Sands, after defeating Sachia Vickery and Polona Hercog in the first two qualifying rounds.

Diyas started grass-court season with a first-round loss at the Surbiton Trophy but then following week won the $100k Manchester Trophy, scoring victories against Emily Webley-Smith, Arina Rodionova, Magdalena Fręch, Naomi Broady and Aleksandra Krunić without dropping a set. At Wimbledon, Diyas was given a wildcard into the main draw. She won her first two matches against Han Xinyun and Arina Rodionova but lost to another returning player, Petra Martić, in the third round.

At the Japan Women's Open, Diyas won all her qualifying matches to reach the main draw. She went on to score victories against several higher-ranked players, namely local favourite Misaki Doi, top 30 player Zhang Shuai, compatriot Yulia Putintseva and defending champion Christina McHale. In the final, she beat fellow qualifier Miyu Kato to win her first ever WTA title.

=== 2018: Back in the top 100 and another injury ===
Diyas chose Shenzhen Open as her Australian Open warm-up tournament. There she recorded two wins before she lost to Sharapova in the quarterfinal. Diyas was ranked well inside the top 100 on New Year's Day of 2018 at No. 66, and thus was directly accepted into the main draw of a Grand Slam tournament at the Australian Open for the first time since the 2016 Wimbledon Championships. However, she lost in the first round to Sorana Cîrstea in three sets. In March, Diyas reached the fourth round of a Premier Mandatory event at the Miami Open but had to retire while a set down in her match against Karolína Plíšková.

In May, she reached the quarterfinals of a WTA Tour clay-court event for the first time in her career at Strasbourg, losing in straight sets to the eventual champion Anastasia Pavlyuchenkova. Subsequently, she won her opening match at the French Open, before losing in the second round to Naomi Osaka. In her first-round match against Sam Stosur at the Nottingham Open, Diyas suffered a serious knee injury that saw her miss the entire grass-court season. She returned for the US Open but lost in the first round to Karolína Plíšková. Diyas was also unsuccessful in defending her title at the Japan Women's Open, losing in the quarterfinals to No. 1 seed, Zhang Shuai.

=== 2019–22: Australian Open third round, struggles and injury ===
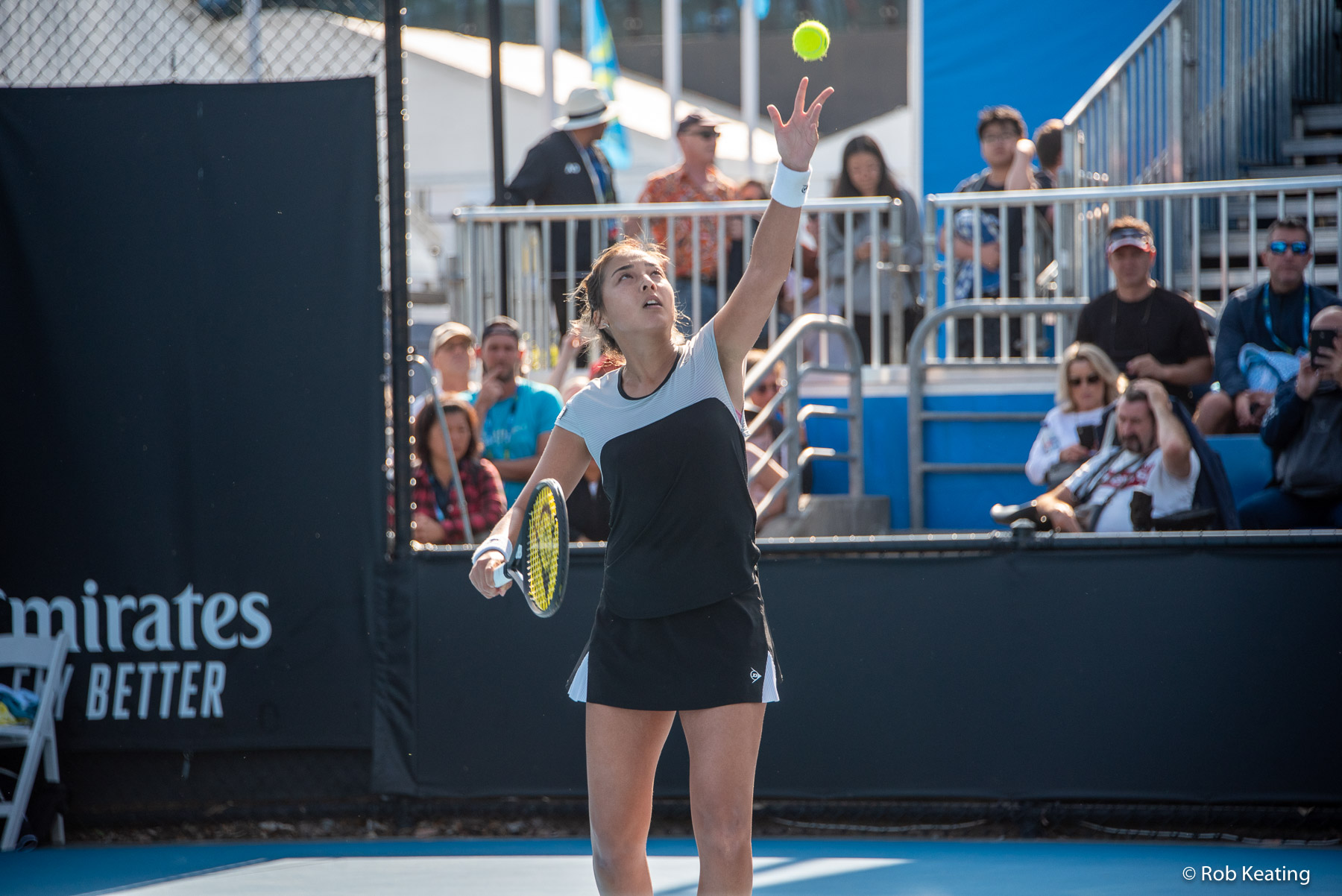
Diyas prepares for the serve at the 2020 Australian Open

At the start of 2019, Diyas lost in the first round of the Australian Open to Aleksandra Krunić. First-round losses followed at Dubai and Indian Wells, and her failure to qualify for the Miami Open saw her once again drop out of the top 100. However, in May, she won her eighth career ITF singles title at the Kangaroo Cup, which was enough to edge her back into the top 100.

Diyas began the 2020 season at the Shenzhen Open, losing in the quarterfinals to Garbiñe Muguruza. She played at the Australian Open, facing No. 10, Kiki Bertens, in the third round but losing and missing a chance for her best finish at that tournament.

At the Cincinnati Open, she failed to qualify for the main draw. At the US Open, she lost in the first round to Bernarda Pera. Just like in her previous Premier-5 appearance, she failed to qualify for the main draw at the Italian Open. At her last event of 2020, she lost at the French Open in the first round to Ons Jabeur.

Diyas recorded wins against Tamara Zidanšek and Bernarda Pera to reach the third round of the 2021 Australian Open, where she lost to Garbiñe Muguruza. At the French Open, she eliminated Heather Watson before being defeated by Mertens in the second round. At the next major event, she lost to Anastasija Sevastova in the first round in Wimbledon. She withdrew mid-match in the first round of the women's singles at the 2020 Summer Olympics due to heat exhaustion. In the US Open, Diyas lost to Amanda Anisimova in the first round. Her season concluded at the $80k Macon tournament in October, where she finished runner-up to Madison Brengle. She finished the season ranked 100th.

Diyas lost in the first round at both the 2022 Australian Open and French Open, then ended season in June due to injury. She was ranked No. 1042 at the season's end.

=== 2024–26: Comeback after hiatus, Australian Open wildcard, retirement ===
In June 2024, following a two-year hiatus, Diyas returned to Wimbledon, where she reached the last round of qualifying losing to Zhuoxuan Bai. At the 2024 China Open, she entered her first WTA Tour main draw, after qualifying, since the 2022 Australian Open and returned to the top 500 in the singles rankings, moving 80 positions up. Diyas lost to fellow qualifier Mananchaya Sawangkaew. She received a main-draw wildcard for the 2026 Australian Open, losing to Paula Badosa in the first round.

Diyas announced her retirement from the professional tour in April 2026.

== National representation ==
=== Billie Jean King Cup ===
Diyas made her senior Billie Jean King Cup debut for Kazakhstan in 2009, representing the team from 2009 to 2011, 2015 through 2016, and 2018 through 2019. The team competition was known as Fed Cup up until 2020. Diyas has played in 19 ties, compiling an overall record of 18–8 split between 14–5 in singles and 4–3 in doubles. When Diyas debuted for Kazakhstan, they were in Asia/Oceania Zone Group II. To be promoted to the group I for 2010 Fed Cup, Kazakhstan needed to win their round-robin group, which also consisted of Iran, Singapore and Hong Kong. They first played against Singapore, winning with a 3–0 score. After that, with the same score, they defeated Iran, when Diyas debuted, winning in doubles alongside Galina Voskoboeva with a double bagel. Kazakhstan were promoted to Zone Group I for 2010 after winning all matches against Singapore, Iran and Hong Kong. The following year, they came second in a group where they beat Thailand and Uzbekistan both by a 2–1 score, but lost to Chinese Taipei. That sent them to the playoff, where they defeated South Korea. Again, Diyas only played in doubles. Although she lost that match while partnering with Sesil Karatantcheva, Kazakhstan won another two singles matches and stayed in group I for 2011. Being in group I in 2011, Kazakhstan had another chance to advance out of the Zone Group and play in the World Group II playoff, but they failed, coming second in their round-robin group. In a play-off of the Zone Group, they lost to Thailand and stayed in group I for 2012.

Diyas did not play any match for Kazakhstan from 2012 to 2014. During that time, Kazakhstan remained in Zone Group I. They had a chance to be promoted to World Group II in 2014 but lost the World Group II play-off in 2013 to France. On her return in 2015, Diyas won all of her three singles matches. That was enough for Kazakhstan to win their round-robin group; however, they later lost to Japan in the playoff, missing another chance to get to the World Group II playoff. The next year, Diyas only played singles matches and was victorious in both of them, but it was not enough for Kazakhstan to win their round-robin group. Later they played against India for 5th place in Zone Group I, but didn not win the tie. After one year of absence, Diyas not only returned to play at Fed Cup, but also played her first doubles match there since her debut in 2009. Kazakhstan was the winner of their round-robin group, where Diyas won all her five matches, three in singles and two in doubles. Nonetheless, in the playoff of Zone Group, they lost against Japan and missed their chance to play in the World Group II playoff to potentially get to the World Group II in 2019.

The 2019 Fed Cup was important for Diyas, being the first year when Kazakhstan advanced out of the Zone Group with Diyas as part of the team. In the World Group II playoff, Kazakhstan faced Great Britain. Diyas lost both of her singles matches, against Johanna Konta and Katie Boulter, despite winning the first set of both matches. In 2020, format of the Fed Cup changed, allowing Kazakhstan to be a part of the 2020 Fed Cup qualifying round. Kazakhstan played against Belgium for their place in the Finals round but lost 1–3. Diyas had two singles match losses against Kirsten Flipkens and Elise Mertens. Due to the COVID-19 pandemic, the 2020 Fed Cup was forced to be split into two years, so that the 2020 Fed Cup Finals round was postponed to 2021, when it was renamed the Billie Jean King Cup.

== Playing style ==
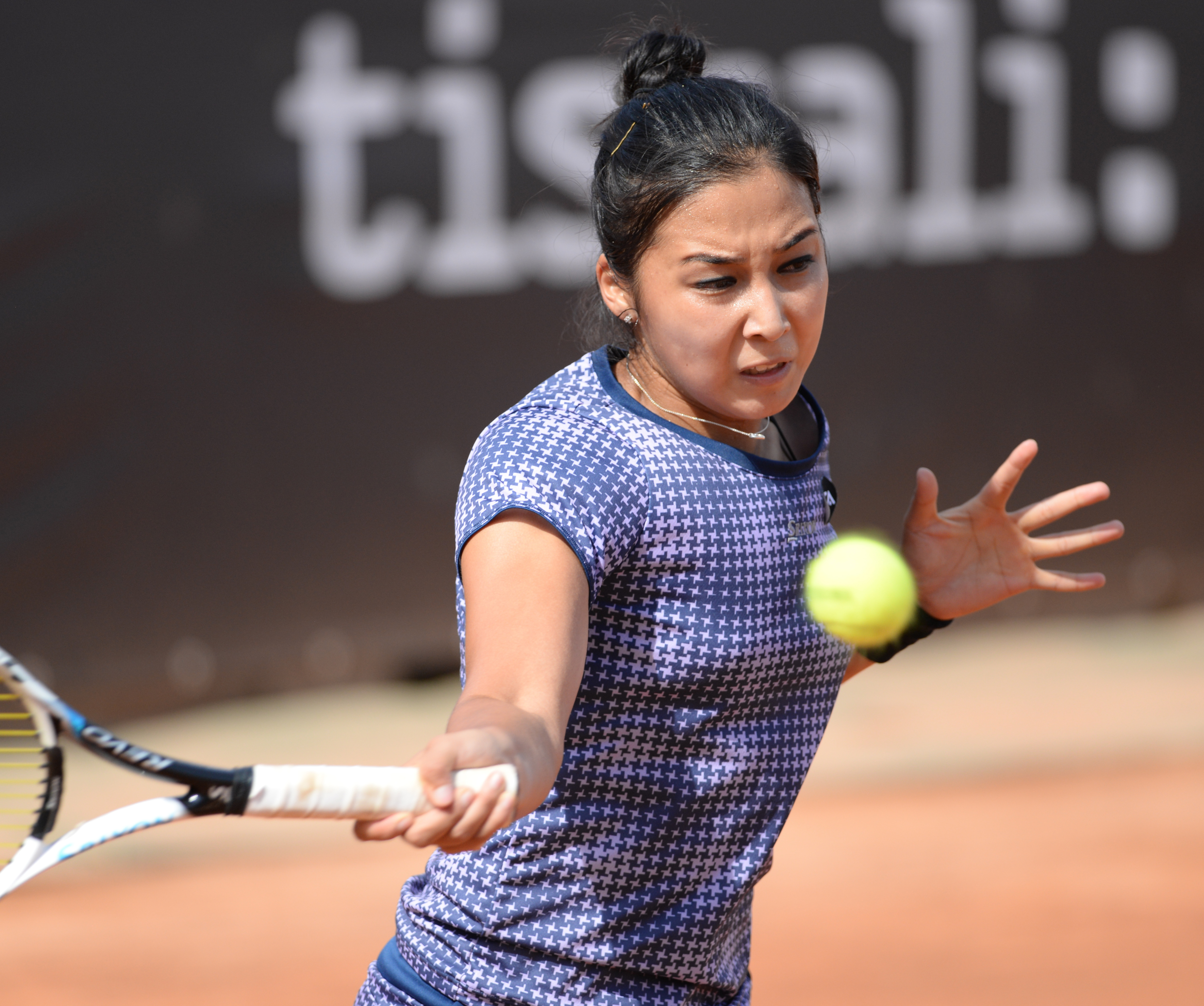
Diyas preparing for a forehand shot

Diyas is primarily an aggressive baseliner whose game is centered around powerful and accurate groundstrokes. Her forehand, which generates a considerable amount of pace, is often used to move her opponents around the court and out of position, which therefore allows her to dominate and win points from or around the back of the court. Her serve, while not necessarily a weapon in her arsenal, is quite effective when placed properly and she employs a tactic of a delayed service motion, which often prevents her opponents from appropriately timing a return. While not a great mover on court, she is able to partly compensate for that with her tenacious fighting qualities.

As a junior, Diyas was coached by Jaroslav Jandus when she was 17 years old. After undergoing shoulder surgery in late 2011, she started working with Alan Ma in Guangzhou. In 2018, she split with Ma and started a collaboration with two Italians, Roberto Antonini as her coach and Carlo Bilardo as her athletic trainer. Dunlop sponsors Diyas, providing her racquets, clothing and shoes. She uses the Dunlop Srixon Revo CV 3.0 Tennis Racquet.

== Personal life ==
She has named Justine Henin, Martina Hingis, and Serena Williams as her tennis idols. Diyas is fluent in Russian, Czech, and English. In an interview with Tennis Prose, Diyas stated that her favourite tournament is Wimbledon, which she loves for its tradition and history.

In 2019, she won the Fed Cup Heart Award for the Asia/Oceania Zone Group I. She is the third player from Kazakhstan to win that award, and hers was the fourth won by a Kazakhstan national. In 2014, she was nominated for Newcomer of the Year but lost to Belinda Bencic.

== Performance timelines ==
Key
W	F	SF	QF	#R	RR	Q#	P#	DNQ	A	Z#	PO	G	S	B	NMS	NTI	P	NH

(W) winner; (F) finalist; (SF) semifinalist; (QF) quarterfinalist; (#R) rounds 4, 3, 2, 1; (RR) round-robin stage; (Q#) qualification round; (P#) preliminary round; (DNQ) did not qualify; (A) absent; (Z#) Davis/Fed Cup Zonal Group (with number indication) or (PO) play-off; (G) gold, (S) silver or (B) bronze Olympic/Paralympic medal; (NMS) not a Masters tournament; (NTI) not a Tier I tournament; (P) postponed; (NH) not held; (SR) strike rate (events won / competed); (W–L) win–loss record.
To avoid confusion and double counting, these charts are updated at the conclusion of a tournament or when the player's participation has ended.

Only main-draw results in WTA Tour, Grand Slam tournaments, Fed Cup/Billie Jean King Cup and Olympic Games are included in win–loss records.

=== Singles ===
Tournament	2009	2010	2011	2012	2013	2014	2015	2016	2017	2018	2019	2020	2021	2022	2023	2024	2025	2026	SR	W–L	Win %
Grand Slam tournaments
Australian Open	A	A	Q3	A	Q1	3R	3R	1R	A	1R	1R	3R	3R	1R	A	A	A	1R	0 / 9	8–9	47%
French Open	A	Q2	Q1	A	Q1	1R	2R	2R	Q3	2R	2R	1R	2R	Q1	A	A	A	-	0 / 7	5–7	42%
Wimbledon	A	A	A	A	A	4R	4R	1R	3R	A	1R	NH	1R	A	A	Q3	A	-	0 / 6	8–6	57%
US Open	Q1	A	Q2	A	Q2	3R	1R	A	Q1	1R	1R	1R	1R	A	A	Q1	A	-	0 / 6	2–6	25%
Win–loss	0–0	0–0	0–0	0–0	0–0	7–4	6–4	1–3	2–1	1–3	1–4	2–3	3–4	0–1	0–0	0–0	0–0	0–1	0 / 28	23–28	45%
WTA 1000
Dubai / Qatar Open (Note: The first Premier 5 event of the year has switched back and forth between the Dubai Tennis Championships and the Qatar Ladies Open since 2009. Dubai was classified as a Premier 5 event from 2009 to 2011 before being succeeded by Doha for the 2012–2014 period. In 2015, Dubai regained its Premier 5 status while Doha was demoted to Premier status. The Premier 5 tournaments were reclassified as WTA 1000 tournaments in 2021.)	A	A	A	A	Q2	Q1	3R	1R	A	A	1R	A	A	A		A	A	-	0 / 3	2–3	40%
Indian Wells	A	A	A	A	A	A	3R	2R	A	1R	1R	NH	2R	A		A	A	-	0 / 5	3–5	38%
Miami Open	A	A	A	A	A	2R	2R	3R	A	4R	Q1	NH	2R	A		A	A	-	0 / 5	7–5	58%
Madrid Open	A	A	A	A	A	A	1R	A	A	1R	A	NH	Q2	A		A	A	-	0 / 2	0–2	0%
Italian Open	A	A	A	A	A	A	2R	A	A	1R	A	Q1	A	A		A	A	-	0 / 2	1–2	33%
Canadian Open	A	A	A	A	A	A	1R	A	A	A	A	NH	A	A		A	A	-	0 / 1	0–1	0%
Cincinnati Open	A	A	A	A	A	2R	1R	A	Q2	Q2	2R	Q1	A	A		A	A	-	0 / 3	2–3	40%
Wuhan Open (Note: In 2014, the Pan Pacific Open was downgraded to a Premier event and replaced by the Wuhan Open. The Premier 5 tournaments were reclassified as WTA 1000 tournaments in 2021.)	A	A	Q2	A	A	2R	1R	A	A	A	Q2	NH		A		A	A	-	0 / 2	1–2	33%
China Open	A	Q1	A	A	A	2R	1R	A	Q2	1R	Q2	NH		A		1R	Q1	-	0 / 4	1–4	20%
Career statistics
Tournaments	1	4	4	2	1	14	27	12	5	19	13	6	17	1	0	1	0	1	Total: 128		
Titles	0	0	0	0	0	0	0	0	1	0	0	0	0	0	0	0	0	0	Total: 1		
Finals	0	0	0	0	0	1	0	0	1	0	0	0	0	0	0	0	0	0	Total: 2		
Overall win–loss	2–1	2–4	1–4	0–2	1–1	20–14	19–27	8–12	7–4	13–19	8–15	5–8	13–17	0–1	0–0	0–1	0–0	0–1	1 / 128	99–131	43%
Year-end ranking	206	173	223	265	163	34	52	148	66	91	78	79	100	1042	-	383	301		$3,754,277		

=== Doubles ===
Tournament	2014	2015	2016	2017	2018	2019	2020	2021	2022	SR	W–L	Win%
Australian Open	A	2R	1R	A	2R	2R	2R	1R	A	0 / 6	4–6	40%
French Open	A	2R	A	A	1R	A	1R	2R	A	0 / 4	2–4	33%
Wimbledon	2R	1R	A	A	A	A	NH	2R	A	0 / 3	2–3	40%
US Open	QF	1R	A	A	1R	A	A	2R	A	0 / 4	4–4	50%
Win–loss	4–2	2–4	0–1	0–0	1–3	1–1	1–2	3–4	0–0	0 / 17	12–17	41%

== WTA Tour finals ==
=== Singles: 2 (1 title, 1 runner-up) ===
Legend WTA 250 (1–1)	Finals by surface Hard (1–1)	Finals by setting Outdoor (1–1)

Result	W–L	Date	Tournament	Tier	Surface	Opponent	Score
Loss	0–1	Oct 2014	Japan Women's Open, Japan	International (Note: The WTA International tournaments were reclassified as WTA 250 tournaments in 2021.)	Hard	(Australia) Samantha Stosur	6–7^{(7–9)}, 3–6
Win	1–1	Sep 2017	Japan Women's Open, Japan	International	Hard	(Japan) Miyu Kato	6–2, 7–5

== ITF Circuit finals ==
=== Singles: 21 (12 titles, 9 runner-ups) ===
Legend $100,000 tournaments (1–2) $75,000 tournaments (1–1) $50/60,000 tournaments (1–2) W50 tournaments (2–0) W25/35 tournaments (7–4)	Finals by surface Hard (8–4) Clay (1–2) Grass (2–2) Carpet (1–1)

Result	W–L	Date	Tournament	Tier	Surface	Opponent	Score
Win	1–0	Nov 2008	ITF Astana, Kazakhstan	25k	Hard (i)	(Ukraine) Tetyana Arefyeva	7–5, 6–4
Win	2–0	Jul 2009	ITF Stuttgart, Germany	25k	Clay	(Hungary) Katalin Marosi	6–1, 6–2
Loss	2–1	Jun 2010	ITF Rome, Italy	25k	Clay	(Austria) Patricia Mayr	6–7^{(2)}, 4–6
Loss	2–2	Mar 2011	ITF Kunming, China	25k	Hard	(France) Iryna Brémond	6–1, 2–6, 3–6
Win	3–2	Jun 2012	ITF Bukhara, Uzbekistan	25k	Hard	(Ukraine) Lyudmyla Kichenok	6–0, 6–0
Loss	3–3	Oct 2012	ITF Taipei, Taiwan	25k	Hard	(China) Zheng Saisai	4–6, 1–6
Win	4–3	Oct 2013	ITF Makinohara, Japan	25k	Grass	(Switzerland) Belinda Bencic	6–3, 6–4
Loss	4–4	Nov 2013	Taipei Cup, Taiwan	50k	Hard	(Poland) Paula Kania	1–6, 3–6
Loss	4–5	Jan 2014	ITF Hong Kong, China SAR	25k	Hard	(Russia) Elizaveta Kulichkova	2–6, 2–6
Win	5–5	Mar 2014	Blossom Cup, China	50k	Hard	(Thailand) Noppawan Lertcheewakarn	6–1, 6–1
Loss	5–6	Jun 2014	Nottingham Trophy, United Kingdom	75k	Grass	(Czech Republic) Kristýna Plíšková	2–6, 6–3, 4–6
Win	6–6	Apr 2017	ITF Nanning, China	25k	Hard	(Chinese Taipei) Lee Ya-hsuan	6–2, 6–3
Loss	6–7	Apr 2017	Kunming Open, China	100k+H	Clay	(China) Zheng Saisai	5–7, 4–6
Win	7–7	Jun 2017	Manchester Trophy, United Kingdom	100k	Grass	(Serbia) Aleksandra Krunić	6–4, 6–4
Win	8–7	May 2019	Kangaroo Cup, Japan	W80	Hard	(Chinese Taipei) Liang En-shuo	6–0, 6–2
Loss	8–8	May 2019	Fukuoka International, Japan	W60	Carpet	(United Kingdom) Heather Watson	6–7^{(1)}, 6–7^{(4)}
Loss	8–9	Jun 2019	Manchester Trophy, United Kingdom	W100	Grass	(Poland) Magda Linette	6–7^{(1)}, 6–2, 3–6
Win	9–9	Jan 2020	ITF Hong Kong	W25	Hard	(China) Zhu Lin	6–4, 7–5
Win	10–9	Oct 2024	ITF Kayseri, Turkey	W50	Hard	Aliona Falei	0–6, 6–4, 6–3
Win	11–9	May 2025	Kurume Cup, Japan	W50+H	Carpet	(Japan) Ayano Shimizu	6–4, 6–3
Win	12–9	Jun 2025	ITF Tauste, Spain	W35	Hard	(Italy) Diletta Cherubini	6–1, 6–7^{(4)}, 6–1

=== Doubles: 1 (runner–up) ===
Legend $25,000 tournaments	Finals by surface Hard (0–1)

Result	Date	Tournament	Tier	Surface	Partner	Opponents	Score
Loss	Jan 2014	ITF Hong Kong, China SAR	25,000	Hard	(Hong Kong) Zhang Ling	(Japan) Misa Eguchi (Japan) Eri Hozumi	4–6, 2–6

== Team competition ==
=== Fed Cup/Billie Jean King Cup ===
Legend
World Group 2 Play-off (0–2)
Zone Group round robin / playoff (16–3)

==== Singles (14–3) ====
Edition	Stage	Date	Location	Against	Surface	Opponent	W/L	Score
2011	Z1 R/R	2 February 2011	Nonthaburi (THA)	(Japan) Japan	Hard	Misaki Doi	W	6–7^{(5)}, 6–4, 4–3 ret.
2011	Z1 R/R	3 February 2011	Nonthaburi (THA)	Chinese Taipei	Hard	Juan Ting-fei	W	6–0, 6–2
2011	Z1 R/R	4 February 2011	Nonthaburi (THA)	South Korea	Hard	Lee Ye-ra	W	6–2, 6–1
2015	Z1 R/R	4 February 2015	Guangzhou (CHN)	China	Hard	Zhang Shuai	W	7–5, 6–0
2015	Z1 R/R	5 February 2015	Guangzhou (CHN)	Chinese Taipei	Hard	Hsieh Su-wei	W	6–4, 2–6, 7–5
2015	Z1 R/R	6 February 2015	Guangzhou (CHN)	Thailand	Hard	Nicha Lertpitaksinchai	W	6–0, 6–0
2016	Z1 R/R	3 February 2016	Hua Hin (THA)	South Korea	Hard	Jang Su-jeong	W	6–1, 6–3
2016	Z1 R/R	4 February 2016	Hua Hin (THA)	Chinese Taipei	Hard	Hsieh Su-wei	W	6–3, 6–1
2018	Z1 R/R	7 February 2018	New Delhi (IND)	Hong Kong	Hard	Wu Ho-ching	W	6–3, 6–1
2018	Z1 R/R	8 February 2018	New Delhi (IND)	India	Hard	Karman Thandi	W	6–3, 6–2
2018	Z1 R/R	9 February 2018	New Delhi (IND)	China	Hard	Yang Zhaoxuan	W	7–5, 6–2
2018	Z1 P/O	10 February 2018	New Delhi (IND)	Japan	Hard	Kurumi Nara	L	5–7, 4–6
2019	Z1 R/R	6 February 2019	Astana (KAZ)	Thailand	Hard (i)	Mananchaya Sawangkaew	W	6–1, 6–3
2019	Z1 R/R	8 February 2019	Astana (KAZ)	India	Hard (i)	Karman Thandi	W	6–3, 6–2
2019	Z1 P/O	9 February 2019	Astana (KAZ)	China	Hard (i)	Zheng Saisai	W	6–3, 6–2
2019	WG2 P/O	20 April 2019	London (GBR)	(United Kingdom) Great Britain	Hard (i)	Johanna Konta	L	6–4, 3–6, 2–6
2019	WG2 P/O	21 April 2019	London (GBR)	(United Kingdom) Great Britain	Hard (i)	Katie Boulter	L	7–6^{(1)}, 4–6, 1–6

==== Doubles (2–2) ====
Edition	Stage	Date	Location	Against	Surface	Partner	Opponents	W/L	Score
2009	Z2 R/R	5 February 2009	Perth (AUS)	Iran	Hard	(Kazakhstan) Galina; Voskoboeva	Madona Najarian; Ghazaleh Torkaman	W	6–0, 6–0
2010	Z1 P/O	6 February 2010	Kuala Lumpur (MAL)	South Korea	Hard	(Kazakhstan) Sesil; Karatantcheva	Kim So-jung; Lee Jin-a	L	6–1, 1–6, 5–7
2011	Z1 R/R	2 February 2011	Nonthaburi (THA)	Japan	Hard	(Kazakhstan) Galina; Voskoboeva	Rika Fujiwara; Ayumi Morita	L	4–6, 3–6
2011	Z1 R/R	4 February 2011	Nonthaburi (THA)	South Korea	Hard	(Kazakhstan) Galina; Voskoboeva	Kim Na-ri; Kim So-jung	W	6–4, 6–0

== Wins against top 10 players ==
- Diyas's victories against players who were, at the time the match was played, ranked in the top 10.

Season	2010	...	2015	Total
Wins	1		1	2

#	Player	Rank	Event	Surface	Rd	Score
2010
1.	(Serbia) Jelena Janković	No. 7	Kremlin Cup, Russia	Hard (i)	2R	6–1, 6–2
2015
2.	(Germany) Andrea Petkovic	No. 10	Dubai Championships, UAE	Hard	2R	7–5, 6–3
