= 2011 Fed Cup Asia/Oceania Zone Group II – play-offs =

The play-offs of the 2011 Fed Cup Asia/Oceania Zone Group II were the final stages of the Group II Zonal Competition involving teams from Asia and Oceania. Using the positions determined in their pools, the eight teams faced off to determine their placing in the 2011 Fed Cup Asia/Oceania Zone Group II. The top team advanced to 2012 Fed Cup Asia/Oceania Zone Group I.

Placing	Pool A	Pool B
1	Indonesia	Hong Kong
2	Philippines	Singapore
3	Pakistan	Turkmenistan
4	Kyrgyzstan	Oman

== Promotional Round ==
The first placed teams of each pool played in a head-to-head round. The winner advanced to the 2011 Fed Cup Asia/Oceania Zone Group I for 2012.

=== Indonesia vs. Hong Kong ===
Indonesia
2
National Tennis Centre, Nonthaburi, Thailand
February 5, 2011
Hard (outdoors)

Hong Kong
1

			1	2	3
1	(Indonesia) (Hong Kong)	Ayu-Fani Damayanti; Katherine Ip	6; 1	6; 1
2	(Indonesia) (Hong Kong)	Lavinia Tananta; Zhang Ling	6; 3	2; 6	5; 7
3	(Indonesia) (Hong Kong)	Yayuk Basuki / Jessy Rompies; Ho Ching Wu / Zhang Ling	6; 1	4; 6	6; 4

== 3rd to 4th play-off ==
The second placed teams of each pool played in a head-to-head round to find the third and fourth placed teams.

=== Philippines vs. Singapore ===
Philippines
2
National Tennis Centre, Nonthaburi, Thailand
February 5, 2011
Hard (outdoors)

Singapore
1

			1	2	3
1	(Philippines) (Singapore)	Anna Clarice Patrimonio; Clare Fong	6; 1	6; 1
2	(Philippines) (Singapore)	Anna Christine Patrimonio; Stefanie Tan	6^{4} 7^{7}	6; 2	6^{5} 7^{7}
3	(Philippines) (Singapore)	Tamitha Nguyen / Anna Clarice Patrimonio; Clare Fong / Stefanie Tan	6; 2	6; 2

== 5th to 6th play-off ==
The third placed teams of each pool played in a head-to-head round to find the fifth and sixth placed teams.

=== Pakistan vs. Turkmenistan ===
Pakistan
1
National Tennis Centre, Nonthaburi, Thailand
February 5, 2011
Hard (outdoors)

Turkmenistan
2

			1	2	3
1	(Pakistan) (Turkmenistan)	Ushna Suhail; Amangul Mollayeva	6; 1	6; 0
2	(Pakistan) (Turkmenistan)	Sarah Mahboob Khan; Anastasiya Prenko	1; 6	1; 6
3	(Pakistan) (Turkmenistan)	Sarah Mahboob Khan / Ushna Suhail; Jenneta Halliyeva / Anastasiya Prenko	2; 6	2; 6

== 7th to 8th play-off ==
The last placed teams of each pool played in a head-to-head round to find the seventh and eighth placed teams.

=== Kyrgyzstan vs. Oman ===
Kyrgyzstan
0
National Tennis Centre, Nonthaburi, Thailand
February 5, 2011
Hard (outdoors)

Oman
3

			1	2	3
1	(Kyrgyzstan) (Oman)	Alena Panfilova; Sarah Al Balushi	1; 6	1; 6
2	(Kyrgyzstan) (Oman)	Emilia Tenizbaeva; Fatma Al Nabhani	1; 6	0; 6
3	(Kyrgyzstan) (Oman)	Alena Panfilova / Emilia Tenizbaeva; Sarah Al Balushi / Fatma Al Nabhani	0; 6	0; 6

== Final Placements ==
Placing	Teams
Promoted	Indonesia
Second	Hong Kong
Third	Philippines
Fourth	Singapore
Fifth	Turkmenistan
Sixth	Pakistan
Seventh	Oman
Eighth	Kyrgyzstan

- Indonesia advanced to the Fed Cup Asia/Oceania Zone Group I for 2012, but they placed last in their pool and thus was sent to the relegation play-offs. They lost, and therefore was relegated back to Group II for 2013.

== See also ==
- Fed Cup structure
