= 2010 Fed Cup Asia/Oceania Zone Group I – play-offs =

International tennis competition play-offs

The play-offs of the 2010 Fed Cup Asia/Oceania Zone Group I were the final stages of the Group I Zonal Competition involving teams from Asia and Oceania. Using the positions determined in their pools, the eight teams faced off to determine their placing in the 2010 Fed Cup Asia/Oceania Zone Group I. The top team advanced to the World Group II, and the bottom team was relegated down to the Group II for the next year.

Placing	Pool A	Pool B
1	Japan	Chinese Taipei
2	South Korea	Kazakhstan
3	New Zealand	Thailand
4	Indonesia	Uzbekistan

== Promotion play-offs ==
The first placed teams of each pool were placed against each other in a head-to-head round. The winner of the rounds advanced to the World Group II play-offs, where they would get a chance to advance to the World Group II for next year.

=== Japan vs. Chinese Taipei ===
Japan
2
National Tennis Centre, Kuala Lumpur, Malaysia
6 February 2010
Synpave (outdoors)

Chinese Taipei
1

			1	2	3
1	(Japan) (Chinese Taipei)	Ayumi Morita; Chang Kai-chen	6^{2} 7^{7}	4; 6
2	(Japan) (Chinese Taipei)	Kimiko Date-Krumm; Chan Yung-jan	7; 5	7; 5
3	(Japan) (Chinese Taipei)	Rika Fujiwara / Ayumi Morita; Chuang Chia-jung / Hsieh Su-wei	6; 3	6; 3

== Third to Fourth play-offs ==
The second-placed teams from each pool were drawn in head-to-head rounds to find the third and fourth placed teams.

=== South Korea vs. Kazakhstan ===
South Korea
1
National Tennis Centre, Kuala Lumpur, Malaysia
6 February 2010
Synpave (outdoors)

Kazakhstan
2

			1	2	3
1	(South Korea) (Kazakhstan)	Yu Min-hwa; Galina Voskoboeva	2; 6	2; 6
2	(South Korea) (Kazakhstan)	Kim Na-ri; Yaroslava Shvedova	3; 6	3; 6
3	(South Korea) (Kazakhstan)	Kim So-jung / Lee Jin-a; Zarina Diyas / Sesil Karatantcheva	1; 6	6; 1	7; 5

== Fifth to Sixth play-off ==
The third placed teams of each pool were placed against each other in a ties. The winner of the tie was allocated fifth place in the Group while the loser was allocated sixth.

=== New Zealand vs. Thailand ===
New Zealand
2
National Tennis Centre, Kuala Lumpur, Malaysia
6 February 2010
Synpave (outdoors)

Thailand
1

			1	2	3
1	(New Zealand) (Thailand)	Ellen Barry; Nudnida Luangnam	6; 4	6; 4
2	(New Zealand) (Thailand)	Sacha Jones; Suchanun Viratprasert	6; 4	6; 3
3	(New Zealand) (Thailand)	Ellen Barry / Sacha Jones; Nudnida Luangnam / Varatchaya Wongteanchai	0; 2			retired

== Relegation play-offs ==
The last placed teams of each pool were placed against each other in a head-to-head round. The losing team was relegated to Group II for next year.

=== Indonesia vs. Uzbekistan ===
Indonesia
0
National Tennis Centre, Kuala Lumpur, Malaysia
6 February 2010
Synpave (outdoors)

Uzbekistan
3

			1	2	3
1	(Indonesia) (Uzbekistan)	Lavinia Tananta; Nigina Abduraimova	3; 6	1; 6
2	(Indonesia) (Uzbekistan)	Ayu-Fani Damayanti; Akgul Amanmuradova	0; 5			retired
3	(Indonesia) (Uzbekistan)	Sandy Gumulya / Jessy Rompies; Nigina Abduraimova / Albina Khabibulina	4; 6	5; 7

== Final Placements ==
Placing	Teams
Promoted	Japan
Second	Chinese Taipei
Third	Kazakhstan
Fourth	South Korea
Fifth	New Zealand
Sixth	Thailand
Seventh	Uzbekistan
Relegated	Indonesia

- Japan advanced to the World Group II play-offs, and were drawn against Slovenia. They lost 1–4, and thus was relegated back to Group I for 2011.
- Indonesia was relegated down to Asia/Oceania Zone Group II for the next year, where they placed first overall and thus achieved advancement back to Group I for 2012.

== See also ==
- Fed Cup structure
