= 2011 Fed Cup Asia/Oceania Zone Group I – play-offs =

The play-offs of the 2011 Fed Cup Asia/Oceania Zone Group I were the final stages of the Group I Zonal Competition involving teams from Asia and Oceania. Using the positions determined in their pools, the seven teams faced off to determine their placing in the 2011 Fed Cup Asia/Oceania Zone Group I. The top team advanced to the World Group II, and the bottom team was relegated down to the Group II for the next year.

Placing	Pool A	Pool B
1	Uzbekistan	Japan
2	Thailand	Kazakhstan
3	China	South Korea
4	India	Chinese Taipei

== Promotional round ==
The first placed teams of each pool played in a head-to-head round. The winner advanced to the World Group II play-offs, where they'd get a chance to advance to World Group II.

=== Uzbekistan vs. Japan ===
Uzbekistan
0
National Tennis Centre, Nonthaburi, Thailand
February 5, 2011
Hard (outdoors)

Japan
3

			1	2	3
1	(Uzbekistan) (Japan)	Sabina Sharipova; Junri Namigata	4; 6	5; 7
2	(Uzbekistan) (Japan)	Nigina Abduraimova; Ayumi Morita	4; 6	1; 6
3	(Uzbekistan) (Japan)	Nigina Abduraimova / Albina Khabibulina; Rika Fujiwara / Ayumi Morita	1; 2			retired

== 3rd to 4th play-off ==
The second placed teams of each pool played in a head-to-head round to find the third and fourth placed teams.

=== Thailand vs. Kazakhstan ===
Thailand
3
National Tennis Centre, Nonthaburi, Thailand
February 5, 2011
Hard (outdoors)

Kazakhstan
0

			1	2	3
1	(Thailand) (Kazakhstan)	Nicha Lertpitaksinchai; Galina Voskoboeva	5; 7	7^{7} 6^{5}	6; 1
2	(Thailand) (Kazakhstan)	Noppawan Lertcheewakarn; Sesil Karatantcheva	6; 3	6; 3
3	(Thailand) (Kazakhstan)	Noppawan Lertcheewakarn / Nungnadda Wannasuk; Sesil Karatantcheva / Galina Voskoboeva	6; 2			retired

== 5th to 6th play-off ==
The third placed teams of each pool played in a head-to-head round to find the fifth and sixth placed teams.

=== China vs. South Korea ===
China
1
National Tennis Centre, Nonthaburi, Thailand
February 5, 2011
Hard (outdoors)

South Korea
2

			1	2	3
1	(China) (South Korea)	Tang Haochen; Hong Hyun-hui	6; 2	6; 0
2	(China) (South Korea)	Tian Ran; Kim So-jung	3; 6	3; 6
3	(China) (South Korea)	Tang Haochen / Tian Ran; Kim So-jung / Lee Ye-ra	2; 6	3; 6

== Relegation play-off ==
The last placed teams of each pool played in a head-to-head round. The loser of was relegated down to Asia/Oceania Zone Group II in 2012.

=== India vs. Chinese Taipei ===
India
1
National Tennis Centre, Nonthaburi, Thailand
February 5, 2011
Hard (outdoors)

Chinese Taipei
2

			1	2	3
1	(India) (Chinese Taipei)	Ashvarya Shrivastava; Juan Ting-fei	3; 6	3; 6
2	(India) (Chinese Taipei)	Poojashree Venkatesha; Chan Chin-wei	5; 7	1; 6
3	(India) (Chinese Taipei)	Rushmi Chakravarthi / Ashvarya Shrivastava; Juan Ting-fei / Miao Yui-lynn	1; 6	6; 3	7^{7} 6^{5}

== Final Placements ==
Placing	Teams
Promoted	Japan
Second	Uzbekistan
Third	Thailand
Fourth	Kazakhstan
Fifth	South Korea
Sixth	China
Seventh	Chinese Taipei
Relegated	India

- Japan advanced to the World Group II play-offs, where they were drawn against Argentina. They won 4-0, and as such were promoted to the World Group II.
- India were relegated down to Group II for 2012, where they placed first in their pool and won their promotional play-off. They thus advanced back to Group I for 2013.

== See also ==
- Fed Cup structure
