= 2011 Fed Cup Asia/Oceania Zone Group II – Pool A =

Group A of the 2011 Fed Cup Asia/Oceania Zone Group II was one of two pools in the Asia/Oceania zone of the 2011 Fed Cup. Four teams competed in a round robin competition, with the teams proceeding to their respective sections of the play-offs: the top team played for advancement to the 2012 Group I.

		(Indonesia) INA	(Kyrgyzstan) KGZ	(Philippines) PHI	(Pakistan) PAK	RR; W–L	Set; W–L	Game; W–L	Standings
41	Indonesia		3–0	3–0	3–0	3–0	18–0	108–15	1
62	Kyrgyzstan	0–3		0–3	1–2	0–3	2–16	24–100	4
72	Philippines	0–3	3–0		3–0	2–1	12–7	88–56	2
	Pakistan	0–3	2–1	0–3		1–2	5–14	48–97	3

== Indonesia vs. Philippines ==
Indonesia
3
National Tennis Centre, Nonthaburi, Thailand
February 2, 2011
Hard (outdoors)

Philippines
0

			1	2	3
1	(Indonesia) (Philippines)	Ayu-Fani Damayanti; Anna Clarice Patrimonio	6; 4	6; 2
2	(Indonesia) (Philippines)	Lavinia Tananta; Anna Christine Patrimonio	6; 2	6; 0
3	(Indonesia) (Philippines)	Yayuk Basuki / Jessy Rompies; Tamitha Nguyen / Anna Clarice Patrimonio	6; 1	6; 2

== Kyrgyzstan vs. Pakistan ==
Kyrgyzstan
1
National Tennis Centre, Nonthaburi, Thailand
February 2, 2011
Hard (outdoors)

Pakistan
2

			1	2	3
1	(Kyrgyzstan) (Pakistan)	Emilia Tenizbaeva; Ushna Suhail	1; 6	1; 6
2	(Kyrgyzstan) (Pakistan)	Zhamilia Duisheeva; Sarah Mahboob Khan	6; 0	6; 4
3	(Kyrgyzstan) (Pakistan)	Zhamilia Duisheeva / Emilia Tenizbaeva; Sarah Mahboob Khan / Ushna Suhail	4; 6	2; 6

== Indonesia vs. Pakistan ==
Indonesia
3
National Tennis Centre, Nonthaburi, Thailand
February 3, 2011
Hard (outdoors)

Pakistan
0

			1	2	3
1	(Indonesia) (Pakistan)	Ayu-Fani Damayanti; Ushna Suhail	6; 1	6; 0
2	(Indonesia) (Pakistan)	Lavinia Tananta; Sarah Mahboob Khan	6; 0	6; 1
3	(Indonesia) (Pakistan)	Yayuk Basuki / Jessy Rompies; Saba Aziz / Sara Mansoor	6; 0	6; 0

== Kyrgyzstan vs. Philippines ==
Kyrgyzstan
0
National Tennis Centre, Nonthaburi, Thailand
February 3, 2011
Hard (outdoors)

Philippines
3

			1	2	3
1	(Kyrgyzstan) (Philippines)	Alena Panfilova; Tamitha Nguyen	0; 6	0; 6
2	(Kyrgyzstan) (Philippines)	Zhamilia Duisheeva; Anna Clarice Patrimonio	1; 6	1; 6
3	(Kyrgyzstan) (Philippines)	Alena Panfilova / Emilia Tenizbaeva; Anna Christine Patrimonio / Marinel Rudas	0; 6	0; 6

== Indonesia vs. Kyrgyzstan ==
Indonesia
3
National Tennis Centre, Nonthaburi, Thailand
February 4, 2011
Hard (outdoors)

Kyrgyzstan
0

			1	2	3
1	(Indonesia) (Kyrgyzstan)	Ayu-Fani Damayanti; Emilia Tenizbaeva	6; 0	6; 0
2	(Indonesia) (Kyrgyzstan)	Lavinia Tananta; Zhamilia Duisheeva	6; 2	6; 0
3	(Indonesia) (Kyrgyzstan)	Yayuk Basuki / Jessy Rompies; Zhamilia Duisheeva / Alena Panfilova	6; 0	6; 0

== Philippines vs. Pakistan ==
Philippines
3
National Tennis Centre, Nonthaburi, Thailand
February 4, 2011
Hard (outdoors)

Pakistan
0

			1	2	3
1	(Philippines) (Pakistan)	Tamitha Nguyen; Ushna Suhail	5; 7	6; 3	6; 3
2	(Philippines) (Pakistan)	Anna Clarice Patrimonio; Sarah Mahboob Khan	6; 4	6; 0
3	(Philippines) (Pakistan)	Anna Christine Patrimonio / Marinel Rudas; Saba Aziz / Sara Mansoor	6; 0	6; 1

== See also ==
- Fed Cup structure
