= 2011 Fed Cup Asia/Oceania Zone Group I – Pool A =

Group A of the 2011 Fed Cup Asia/Oceania Zone Group I was one of two pools in the Asia/Oceania zone of the 2011 Fed Cup. Four teams competed in a round robin competition, with the top team and the bottom team proceeding to their respective sections of the play-offs: the top team played for advancement to the World Group II Play-offs, while the bottom team faced potential relegation to Group II.

		(China) CHN	(Uzbekistan) UZB	(Thailand) THA	(India) IND	RR; W–L	Set; W–L	Game; W–L	Standings
16	China		0–3	2–1	2–1	2–1	10–12	91–106	3
33	Uzbekistan	3–0		1–2	2–1	2–1	14–7	102–88	1
35	Thailand	1–2	2–1		2–1	2–1	11–9	101–88	2
45	India	1–2	1–2	1–2		0–3	5–13	80–90	4

== Thailand vs. Uzbekistan ==
Thailand
2
National Tennis Centre, Nonthaburi, Thailand
February 2, 2011
Hard (outdoors)

Uzbekistan
1

			1	2	3
1	(Thailand) (Uzbekistan)	Nicha Lertpitaksinchai; Sabina Sharipova	3; 6	5; 7
2	(Thailand) (Uzbekistan)	Noppawan Lertcheewakarn; Nigina Abduraimova	6; 3	6; 2
3	(Thailand) (Uzbekistan)	Noppawan Lertcheewakarn / Nungnadda Wannasuk; Nigina Abduraimova / Albina Khabibulina	7^{7} 6^{4}	7^{7} 6^{4}

== China vs. India ==
China
2
National Tennis Centre, Nonthaburi, Thailand
February 2, 2011
Hard (outdoors)

India
1

			1	2	3
1	(China) (India)	Tang Haochen; Poojashree Venkatesha	6; 2	6; 3
2	(China) (India)	Lu Jing-jing; Sania Mirza	6; 1	0; 6	6; 4
3	(China) (India)	Lu Jing-jing / Tian Ran; Rushmi Chakravarthi / Poojashree Venkatesha	3; 6	2; 6

== Thailand vs. China ==
Thailand
1
National Tennis Centre, Nonthaburi, Thailand
February 3, 2011
Hard (outdoors)

China
2

			1	2	3
1	(Thailand) (China)	Nungnadda Wannasuk; Tang Haochen	7^{7} 6^{5}	5; 6		retired
2	(Thailand) (China)	Noppawan Lertcheewakarn; Lu Jing-jing	6; 3	4; 6	6; 1
3	(Thailand) (China)	Noppawan Lertcheewakarn / Nicha Lertpitaksinchai; Lu Jing-jing / Tang Haochen	6^{5} 7^{7}	3; 6

== Uzbekistan vs. India ==
Uzbekistan
2
National Tennis Centre, Nonthaburi, Thailand
February 3, 2011
Hard (outdoors)

India
1

			1	2	3
1	(Uzbekistan) (India)	Sabina Sharipova; Poojashree Venkatesha	6; 1	6; 2
2	(Uzbekistan) (India)	Nigina Abduraimova; Sania Mirza	4; 6	1; 6
3	(Uzbekistan) (India)	Nigina Abduraimova / Albina Khabibulina; Rushmi Chakravarthi / Sania Mirza	2; 6	6; 3	6; 3

== China vs. Uzbekistan ==
China
0
National Tennis Centre, Nonthaburi, Thailand
February 4, 2011
Hard (outdoors)

Uzbekistan
3

			1	2	3
1	(China) (Uzbekistan)	Tang Haochen; Sabina Sharipova	3; 6	2; 6
2	(China) (Uzbekistan)	Lu Jing-jing; Nigina Abduraimova	6; 4	1; 6	1; 6
3	(China) (Uzbekistan)	Lu Jing-jing / Tang Haochen; Nigina Abduraimova / Albina Khabibulina	6^{8} 7^{10}	6; 0	2; 6

== Thailand vs. India ==
Thailand
2
National Tennis Centre, Nonthaburi, Thailand
February 4, 2011
Hard (outdoors)

India
1

			1	2	3
1	(Thailand) (India)	Nicha Lertpitaksinchai; Ashvarya Shrivastava	6; 2	6; 0
2	(Thailand) (India)	Noppawan Lertcheewakarn; Sania Mirza	2; 6	0; 6
3	(Thailand) (India)	Noppawan Lertcheewakarn / Nungnadda Wannasuk; Rushmi Chakravarthi / Sania Mirza	3; 6	6; 0	7; 5

== See also ==
- Fed Cup structure
