= 2012 Fed Cup Asia/Oceania Zone Group I – play-offs =

The play-offs of the 2012 Fed Cup Asia/Oceania Zone Group I were the final stages of the Group I Zonal Competition involving teams from Asia and Oceania. Using the positions determined in their pools, the seven teams faced off to determine their placing in the 2012 Fed Cup Asia/Oceania Zone Group I. The top team advanced to the World Group II, and the bottom team was relegated down to the Group II for the next year.

Placing	Pool A	Pool B
1	China	Kazakhstan
2	Chinese Taipei	Thailand
3		South Korea
4	Uzbekistan	Indonesia

== Promotion play-offs ==
The first placed teams of each pool were drawn in a head-to-head round. The winner of the round advanced to the World Group II play-offs, where they'd get a chance to advanced to World Group II.

=== China vs. Kazakhstan ===
China
2
Shenzhen Luohu Tennis Centre, Shenzhen, China
February 4, 2012
Hard (outdoors)

Kazakhstan
0

			1	2	3
1	(China) (Kazakhstan)	Peng Shuai; Yaroslava Shvedova	6; 3	3; 6	6; 1
2	(China) (Kazakhstan)	Li Na; Galina Voskoboeva	6; 1	3; 6	6; 1
3	(China) (Kazakhstan)	Zhang Shuai / Zheng Jie; Sesil Karatantcheva / Yaroslava Shvedova				not played

== 3rd to 4th play-offs ==
The second placed teams of each pool were drawn in head-to-head rounds to find the third and fourth placed teams.

=== Chinese Taipei vs. Thailand ===
Chinese Taipei
2
Shenzhen Luohu Tennis Centre, Shenzhen, China
February 4, 2012
Hard (outdoors)

Thailand
1

			1	2	3
1	(Chinese Taipei) (Thailand)	Hsieh Su-wei; Varatchaya Wongteanchai	7; 5	6; 3
2	(Chinese Taipei) (Thailand)	Chang Kai-chen; Tamarine Tanasugarn	6; 3	6; 4
3	(Chinese Taipei) (Thailand)	Chan Yung-jan / Chuang Chia-jung; Noppawan Lertcheewakarn / Nungnadda Wannasuk	6; 3	6^{6} 7^{8}	5; 7

== Relegation play-offs ==
The last placed teams of each pool were drawn in a head-to-head round. The loser of each round was relegated down to Asia/Oceania Zone Group II in 2012.

=== Uzbekistan vs. Indonesia ===
Uzbekistan
3
Shenzhen Luohu Tennis Centre, Shenzhen, China
February 4, 2012
Hard (outdoors)

Indonesia
0

			1	2	3
1	(Uzbekistan) (Indonesia)	Nigina Abduraimova; Jessy Rompies	6; 4	5; 7	6; 4
2	(Uzbekistan) (Indonesia)	Akgul Amanmuradova; Ayu Fani Damayanti	6; 2	6; 1
3	(Uzbekistan) (Indonesia)	Nigina Abduraimova / Iroda Tulyaganova; Ayu Fani Damayanti / Lavinia Tananta	6; 1	6; 3

== Final Placements ==
Placing	Team
Promoted	China
Second	Kazakhstan
Third	Chinese Taipei
Fourth	Thailand
Fifth	South Korea
Sixth	Uzbekistan
Relegated	Indonesia

- China advanced to the World Group II play-offs, and were drawn against Argentina. They lost 1–4, and thus was relegated back to Group I for 2011.
- Indonesia was relegated down to 2013 Fed Cup Asia/Oceania Zone Group II.

== See also ==
- Fed Cup structure
