= 2010 Fed Cup Asia/Oceania Zone =

Subsection of tennis competition

The Asia/Oceania Zone was one of three zones of regional competition in the 2010 Fed Cup.

== Group I ==
- Venue: National Tennis Centre, Kuala Lumpur, Malaysia (outdoor hard)
- Dates: 3–6 February

The eight teams were divided into two pools of four teams. The teams that finished first in the pools played-off to determine which team would partake in the World Group II Play-offs. The two nations coming last in the pools also played-off to determine which would be relegated to Group II for 2011.

=== Pools ===
	Pool A	JPN	KOR	NZL	INA
1	Japan (3–0)		3–0	3–0	3–0
2	South Korea (2–1)	0–3		2–1	2–1
3	New Zealand (1–2)	0–3	1–2		3–0
4	Indonesia (0–3)	0–3	1–2	0–3	

	Pool B	TPE	KAZ	THA	UZB
1	Chinese Taipei (3–0)		2–1	2–1	2–1
2	Kazakhstan (2–1)	1–2		2–1	2–1
3	Thailand (1–2)	1–2	1–2		3–0
4	Uzbekistan (0–3)	1–2	1–2	0–3	

=== Play-offs ===
Placing	A Team	Score	B Team
Promotion	Japan	2–1	Chinese Taipei
3rd–4th	South Korea	1–2	Kazakhstan
5th–6th	New Zealand	2–1	Thailand
Relegation	Indonesia	0–3	Uzbekistan

- Japan advanced to 2010 World Group II Play-offs.
- Indonesia was relegated to Group II for 2011.

== Group II ==
- Venue: National Tennis Centre, Kuala Lumpur, Malaysia (outdoor hard)
- Dates: 3–6 February

The seven teams were divided into one pool of three teams and one pool of four. The top team of each pool played-off against each other to decide which nation progress to the Group I.

=== Pools ===
	Pool A	IND	MAS	SIN
1	India (2–0)		3–0	3–0
2	Malaysia (1–1)	0–3		2–1
3	Singapore (0–2)	0–3	1–2	

	Pool B	KGZ	HKG	PHI	SYR
1	Kyrgyzstan (3–0)		2–1	3–0	3–0
2	Hong Kong (2–1)	1–2		3–0	3–0
3	Philippines (1–2)	0–3	0–3		3–0
4	Syria (0–3)	0–3	0–3	0–3	

=== Play-offs ===
Placing	A Team	Score	B Team
Promotion	India	3–0	Kyrgyzstan
3rd–4th	Malaysia	1–2	Hong Kong
5th–6th	Singapore	2–1	Philippines
7th	N/A	–	Syria

- India advanced to Group I for 2011.

== See also ==
- Fed Cup structure
