= 2009 Fed Cup Asia/Oceania Zone Group II – Pool =

The Pool of the 2009 Fed Cup Asia/Oceania Zone Group II composed of four teams competing in a round robin competition. The top two teams qualifying for Group I next year.

		(Hong Kong) HKG	(Kazakhstan) KAZ	(Singapore) SIN	(Iran) IRI	RR; W–L	Set; W–L	Game; W–L	Standings
43	Hong Kong		0–3	3–0	3–0	2–1	13–6	98–50	2
47	Kazakhstan	3–0		3–0	3–0	3–0	18–1	111–29	1
58	Singapore	0–3	0–3		3–0	1–2	6–12	44–80	3
	Iran	0–3	0–3	0–3		0–3	0–18	15–109	4

== Hong Kong vs. Iran ==
Hong Kong
3
State Tennis Centre, Perth, Australia
4 February 2009
Plexicushion (outdoors)

Iran
0

			1	2	3
1	(Hong Kong) (Iran)	Yang Zi-Jun; Shadi Tabatabai	6; 2	6; 1
2	(Hong Kong) (Iran)	Zhang Ling; Ghazaleh Torkaman	6; 0	6; 1
3	(Hong Kong) (Iran)	Sher Pui-Wing / Ho Ching Wu; Madona Najarian / Shadi Tabatabai	6; 0	6; 0

== Kazakhstan vs. Singapore ==
Kazakhstan
3
State Tennis Centre, Perth, Australia
4 February 2009
Plexicushion (outdoors)

Singapore
0

			1	2	3
1	(Kazakhstan) (Singapore)	Galina Voskoboeva; Celina Goetti	6; 0	6; 2
2	(Kazakhstan) (Singapore)	Yaroslava Shvedova; Stefanie Tan	6; 0	6; 0
3	(Kazakhstan) (Singapore)	Yaroslava Shvedova / Galina Voskoboeva; Celina Goetti / Stefanie Tan	6; 1	6; 1

== Hong Kong vs. Singapore ==
Hong Kong
3
State Tennis Centre, Perth, Australia
5 February 2009
Plexicushion (outdoors)

Singapore
0

			1	2	3
1	(Hong Kong) (Singapore)	Yang Zi-Jun; Celina Goetti	6; 2	6; 1
2	(Hong Kong) (Singapore)	Zhang Ling; Stefanie Tan	6; 0	6; 1
3	(Hong Kong) (Singapore)	Yang Zi-Jun / Zhang Ling; Julienne Si Ying Keong / Carolyn Ann Lim Hui	6; 0	6; 0

== Kazakhstan vs. Iran ==
Kazakhstan
3
State Tennis Centre, Perth, Australia
5 February 2009
Plexicushion (outdoors)

Iran
0

			1	2	3
1	(Kazakhstan) (Iran)	Galina Voskoboeva; Madona Najarian	6; 0	6; 0
2	(Kazakhstan) (Iran)	Yaroslava Shvedova; Ghazaleh Torkaman	6; 0	6; 0
3	(Kazakhstan) (Iran)	Zarina Diyas / Galina Voskoboeva; Madona Najarian / Ghazaleh Torkaman	6; 0	6; 0

== Hong Kong vs. Kazakhstan ==
Hong Kong
0
State Tennis Centre, Perth, Australia
6 February 2009
Plexicushion (outdoors)

Kazakhstan
3

			1	2	3
1	(Hong Kong) (Kazakhstan)	Yang Zi-Jun; Galina Voskoboeva	0; 6	6^{2} 7^{7}
2	(Hong Kong) (Kazakhstan)	Zhang Ling; Yaroslava Shvedova	2; 6	3; 6
3	(Hong Kong) (Kazakhstan)	Yang Zi-Jun / Zhang Ling; Valentina Starkova / Galina Voskoboeva	4; 6	6; 2	4; 6

== Singapore vs. Iran ==
Singapore
3
State Tennis Centre, Perth, Australia
6 February 2009
Plexicushion (outdoors)

Iran
0

			1	2	3
1	(Singapore) (Iran)	Yang Zi-Jun; Ghazaleh Torkaman	6; 2	6; 1
2	(Singapore) (Iran)	Zhang Ling; Shadi Tabatabai	6; 0	6; 0
3	(Singapore) (Iran)	Sher Pui-Wing / Ho Ching Wu; Madona Najarian / Ani Nazari	6; 2	6; 3

- Kazakhstan advanced to Group I for 2010, where they placed third overall.

== See also ==
- Fed Cup structure
