= 2010 Fed Cup Asia/Oceania Zone Group I – Pool A =

Group A of the 2010 Fed Cup Asia/Oceania Zone Group I was one of two pools in the Asia/Oceania Zone Group I of the 2010 Fed Cup. Four teams competed in a round robin competition, with the top team and the bottom two teams proceeding to their respective sections of the play-offs: the top teams played for advancement to the World Group II Play-offs, while the bottom teams faced potential relegation to Group II.

		(Japan) JPN	(New Zealand) NZL	(Indonesia) INA	(South Korea) KOR	RR; W–L	Set; W–L	Game; W–L	Standings
18	Japan		3–0	3–0	3–0	3–0	18–1	111–48	1
25	New Zealand	0–3		3–0	1–2	1–2	8–10	74–91	3
32	Indonesia	0–3	0–3		1–2	0–3	2–15	54–95	4
38	South Korea	0–3	2–1	2–1		2–1	8–10	73–78	2

== Japan vs. Indonesia ==
Japan
3
National Tennis Centre, Kuala Lumpur, Malaysia
3 February 2010
Synpave (outdoors)

Indonesia
0

			1	2	3
1	(Japan) (Indonesia)	Ayumi Morita; Lavinia Tananta	6; 1	6; 2
2	(Japan) (Indonesia)	Kimiko Date-Krumm; Ayu-Fani Damayanti	6; 2	6; 0
3	(Japan) (Indonesia)	Rika Fujiwara / Yurika Sema; Sandy Gumulya / Jessy Rompies	6; 2	6; 2

== New Zealand vs. South Korea ==
New Zealand
1
National Tennis Centre, Kuala Lumpur, Malaysia
3 February 2010
Synpave (outdoors)

South Korea
2

			1	2	3
1	(New Zealand) (South Korea)	Marina Erakovic; Lee Jin-a	1; 6	3; 6
2	(New Zealand) (South Korea)	Sacha Jones; Kim So-jung	1; 6	0; 6
3	(New Zealand) (South Korea)	Marina Erakovic / Sacha Jones; Kim Na-ri / Yu Min-hwa	6; 4	6; 4

== Japan vs. New Zealand ==
Japan
3
National Tennis Centre, Kuala Lumpur, Malaysia
4 February 2010
Synpave (outdoors)

New Zealand
0

			1	2	3
1	(Japan) (New Zealand)	Ayumi Morita; Marina Erakovic	2; 6	7^{7} 6^{5}	6; 1
2	(Japan) (New Zealand)	Kimiko Date-Krumm; Sacha Jones	6; 2	6; 4
3	(Japan) (New Zealand)	Rika Fujiwara / Yurika Sema; Marina Erakovic / Sacha Jones	6; 3	6; 4

== Indonesia vs. South Korea ==
Indonesia
1
National Tennis Centre, Kuala Lumpur, Malaysia
4 February 2010
Synpave (outdoors)

South Korea
2

			1	2	3
1	(Indonesia) (South Korea)	Sandy Gumulya; Lee Jin-a	3; 6	3; 6
2	(Indonesia) (South Korea)	Ayu-Fani Damayanti; Kim So-jung	6; 2	6; 1
3	(Indonesia) (South Korea)	Ayu-Fani Damayanti / Sandy Gumulya; Kim So-jung / Lee Jin-a	5; 7	2; 6

== Japan vs. South Korea ==
Japan
3
National Tennis Centre, Kuala Lumpur, Malaysia
5 February 2010
Synpave (outdoors)

South Korea
0

			1	2	3
1	(Japan) (South Korea)	Ayumi Morita; Lee Jin-a	6; 0	6; 2
2	(Japan) (South Korea)	Kimiko Date-Krumm; Kim So-jung	6; 4	6; 2
3	(Japan) (South Korea)	Rika Fujiwara / Yurika Sema; Kim Na-ri / Yu Min-hwa	6; 3	6; 2

== New Zealand vs. Indonesia ==
New Zealand
3
National Tennis Centre, Kuala Lumpur, Malaysia
5 February 2010
Synpave (outdoors)

Indonesia
0

			1	2	3
1	(New Zealand) (Indonesia)	Marina Erakovic; Lavinia Tananta	6; 4	6; 2
2	(New Zealand) (Indonesia)	Sacha Jones; Ayu-Fani Damayanti	6; 4			retired
3	(New Zealand) (Indonesia)	Ellen Barry / Sacha Jones; Sandy Gumulya / Jessy Rompies	6; 4	7^{7} 6^{5}

== See also ==
- Fed Cup structure
