= 2011 Fed Cup Asia/Oceania Zone Group I – Pool B =

Group B of the 2011 Fed Cup Asia/Oceania Zone Group II was one of two pools in the Asia/Oceania zone of the 2011 Fed Cup. Four teams competed in a round robin competition, with the top team and the bottom team proceeding to their respective sections of the play-offs: the top team played for advancement to the World Group II Play-offs, while the bottom team faced potential relegation to Group II.

		(Japan) JPN	(Chinese Taipei) TPE	(Kazakhstan) KAZ	(South Korea) KOR	RR; W–L	Set; W–L	Game; W–L	Standings
20	Japan		3–0	2–1	3–0	3–0	17–2	119–69	1
24	Chinese Taipei	0–3		0–3	0–3	0–3	2–16	50–113	4
34	Kazakhstan	1–2	3–0		2–1	2–1	11–7	103–72	2
37	South Korea	0–3	3–0	1–2		1–2	6–11	68–95	3

== Japan vs. Kazakhstan ==
Japan
2
National Tennis Centre, Nonthaburi, Thailand
February 2, 2011
Hard (outdoors)

Kazakhstan
1

			1	2	3
1	(Japan) (Kazakhstan)	Misaki Doi; Zarina Diyas	7^{7} 6^{5}	4; 6	3; 4	retired
2	(Japan) (Kazakhstan)	Ayumi Morita; Sesil Karatantcheva	6; 4	7^{7} 6^{5}
3	(Japan) (Kazakhstan)	Rika Fujiwara / Ayumi Morita; Zarina Diyas / Galina Voskoboeva	6; 4	6; 3

== Chinese Taipei vs. South Korea ==
Chinese Taipei
1
National Tennis Centre, Nonthaburi, Thailand
February 2, 2011
Hard (outdoors)

South Korea
2

			1	2	3
1	(Chinese Taipei) (South Korea)	Chen Yi; Kim Na-ri	1; 6	5; 7
2	(Chinese Taipei) (South Korea)	Chan Chin-wei; Lee Ye-ra	6^{8} 7^{10}	3; 2		retired
3	(Chinese Taipei) (South Korea)	Chan Chin-wei / Chen Yi; Kim Na-ri / Kim So-jung	1; 6	6; 3	0; 3	retired

== Chinese Taipei vs. Kazakhstan ==
Chinese Taipei
0
National Tennis Centre, Nonthaburi, Thailand
February 3, 2011
Hard (outdoors)

Kazakhstan
3

			1	2	3
1	(Chinese Taipei) (Kazakhstan)	Juan Ting-fei; Zarina Diyas	0; 6	2; 6
2	(Chinese Taipei) (Kazakhstan)	Chan Chin-wei; Sesil Karatantcheva	6^{8} 7^{10}	2; 6
3	(Chinese Taipei) (Kazakhstan)	Juan Ting-fei / Miao Tui-lynn; Sesil Karatantcheva / Galina Voskoboeva	2; 6	1; 6

== Japan vs. South Korea ==
Japan
3
National Tennis Centre, Nonthaburi, Thailand
February 3, 2011
Hard (outdoors)

South Korea
0

			1	2	3
1	(Japan) (South Korea)	Junri Namigata; Hong Hyun-hui	6; 2	6; 4
2	(Japan) (South Korea)	Ayumi Morita; Kim Na-ri	7; 5	6; 1
3	(Japan) (South Korea)	Rika Fujiwara / Junri Namigata; Hong Hyun-hui / Kim So-jung	7; 5	6; 4

== Japan vs. Chinese Taipei ==
Japan
3
National Tennis Centre, Nonthaburi, Thailand
February 4, 2011
Hard (outdoors)

Chinese Taipei
0

			1	2	3
1	(Japan) (Chinese Taipei)	Rika Fujiwara; Miao Yui-lynn	6; 0	6; 1
2	(Japan) (Chinese Taipei)	Junri Namigata; Juan Ting-fei	6^{6} 7^{8}	6; 3	6; 1
3	(Japan) (Chinese Taipei)	Misaki Doi / Junri Namigata; Chan Chin-wei / Miao Yui-lynn	6; 1	6; 2

== Kazakhstan vs. South Korea ==
Kazakhstan
2
National Tennis Centre, Nonthaburi, Thailand
February 4, 2011
Hard (outdoors)

South Korea
1

			1	2	3
1	(Kazakhstan) (South Korea)	Zarina Diyas; Lee Ye-ra	6; 2	6; 1
2	(Kazakhstan) (South Korea)	Sesil Karatantcheva; Kim So-jung	4; 6	5; 7
3	(Kazakhstan) (South Korea)	Zarina Diyas / Galina Voskoboeva; Kim Na-ri / Kim So-jung	6; 4	6; 0

== See also ==
- Fed Cup structure
