= 2012 Fed Cup Asia/Oceania Zone Group I – Pool B =

Group B of the 2012 Fed Cup Asia/Oceania Zone Group I was one of four pools in the Asia/Oceania zone of the 2012 Fed Cup. Three teams competed in a round robin competition, with the top team and the bottom team proceeding to their respective sections of the play-offs: the top team played for advancement to the World Group II Play-offs, while the bottom team faced potential relegation to Group II.

| | | (Thailand) THA | (Kazakhstan) KAZ | (South Korea) KOR | (Indonesia) INA | RR; W–L | Set; W–L | Game; W–L | Standings |
| 29 | Thailand | | 1–2 | 3–0 | 3–0 | 2–1 | 14–7 | 110–87 | 2 |
| 30 | Kazakhstan | 2–1 | | 3–0 | 3–0 | 3–0 | 17–2 | 112–47 | 1 |
| 32 | South Korea | 0–3 | 0–3 | | 2–1 | 1–2 | 6–15 | 74–109 | 3 |
| 38 | Indonesia | 0–3 | 0–3 | 1–2 | | 0–3 | 3–15 | 60–113 | 4 |

== Thailand vs. Indonesia ==
Thailand
3
Shenzhen Luohu Tennis Centre, Shenzhen, China
February 1, 2012
Hard (outdoors)

Indonesia
0

| | | | 1 | 2 | 3 |
|---|---|---|---|---|---|
| 1 | (Thailand) (Indonesia) | Noppawan Lertcheewakarn; Jessy Rompies | 7^{7} 6^{4} | 6; 1 |
| 2 | (Thailand) (Indonesia) | Tamarine Tanasugarn; Ayu Fani Damayanti | 6; 2 | 6; 1 |
| 3 | (Thailand) (Indonesia) | Nungnadda Wannasuk / Varatchaya Wongteanchai; Ayu Fani Damayanti / Jessy Rompies | 6; 3 | 7; 5 |

== Kazakhstan vs. South Korea ==
Kazakhstan
3
Shenzhen Luohu Tennis Centre, Shenzhen, China
February 1, 2012
Hard (outdoors)

South Korea
0

| | | | 1 | 2 | 3 |
|---|---|---|---|---|---|
| 1 | (Kazakhstan) (South Korea) | Yaroslava Shvedova; Lee Ye-ra | 6; 2 | 6; 1 |
| 2 | (Kazakhstan) (South Korea) | Galina Voskoboeva; Han Sung-hee | 6; 1 | 6; 0 |
| 3 | (Kazakhstan) (South Korea) | Yaroslava Shvedova / Galina Voskoboeva; Kim So-jung / Yoo Mi | 6; 1 | 6; 1 |

== Kazakhstan vs. Indonesia ==
Kazakhstan
3
Shenzhen Luohu Tennis Centre, Shenzhen, China
February 2, 2012
Hard (outdoors)

Indonesia
0

| | | | 1 | 2 | 3 |
|---|---|---|---|---|---|
| 1 | (Kazakhstan) (Indonesia) | Yaroslava Shvedova; Jessy Rompies | 6; 0 | 6; 2 |
| 2 | (Kazakhstan) (Indonesia) | Sesil Karatantcheva; Ayu Fani Damayanti | 6; 1 | 6; 1 |
| 3 | (Kazakhstan) (Indonesia) | Sesil Karatantcheva / Galina Voskoboeva; Jessy Rompies / Lavinia Tananta | 6; 1 | 7^{7} 6^{3} |

== Thailand vs. South Korea ==
Thailand
3
Shenzhen Luohu Tennis Centre, Shenzhen, China
February 2, 2012
Hard (outdoors)

South Korea
0

| | | | 1 | 2 | 3 |
|---|---|---|---|---|---|
| 1 | (Thailand) (South Korea) | Noppawan Lertcheewakarn; Han Sung-hee | 7; 5 | 6; 1 |
| 2 | (Thailand) (South Korea) | Tamarine Tanasugarn; Kim So-jung | 2; 6 | 6; 3 | 6; 4 |
| 3 | (Thailand) (South Korea) | Nungnadda Wannasuk / Varatchaya Wongteanchai; Lee Ye-ra / Yoo Mi | 3; 6 | 6; 3 | 6; 1 |

== Thailand vs. Kazakhstan ==
Thailand
1
Shenzhen Luohu Tennis Centre, Shenzhen, China
February 3, 2012
Hard (outdoors)

Kazakhstan
2

| | | | 1 | 2 | 3 |
|---|---|---|---|---|---|
| 1 | (Thailand) (Kazakhstan) | Noppawan Lertcheewakarn; Yaroslava Shvedova | 3; 6 | 6^{6} 7^{8} |
| 2 | (Thailand) (Kazakhstan) | Tamarine Tanasugarn; Galina Voskoboeva | 3; 6 | 3; 6 |
| 3 | (Thailand) (Kazakhstan) | Nungnadda Wannasuk / Varatchaya Wongteanchai; Sesil Karatantcheva / Yaroslava Shvedova | 6; 4 | 3; 6 | 6; 4 |

== South Korea vs. Indonesia ==
South Korea
2
Shenzhen Luohu Tennis Centre, Shenzhen, China
February 3, 2012
Hard (outdoors)

Indonesia
1

| | | | 1 | 2 | 3 |
|---|---|---|---|---|---|
| 1 | (South Korea) (Indonesia) | Han Sung-hee; Jessy Rompies | 6; 4 | 6; 1 |
| 2 | (South Korea) (Indonesia) | Kim So-jung; Ayu Fani Damayanti | 2; 6 | 6^{6} 7^{8} |
| 3 | (South Korea) (Indonesia) | Han Sung-hee / Yoo Mi; Ayu Fani Damayanti / Jessy Rompies | 6^{3} 7^{7} | 6; 3 | 6; 4 |
