= 2012 Fed Cup Asia/Oceania Zone Group I – Pool A =

Group A of the 2012 Fed Cup Asia/Oceania Zone Group I was one of four pools in the Asia/Oceania zone of the 2012 Fed Cup. Three teams competed in a round robin competition, with the top team and the bottom team proceeding to their respective sections of the play-offs: the top team played for advancement to the World Group II Play-offs, while the bottom team faced potential relegation to Group II.

		(China) CHN	(Uzbekistan) UZB	(Chinese Taipei) TPE	RR; W–L	Set; W–L	Game; W–L	Standings
25	China		3–0	3–0	2–0	12–2	83–43	1
31	Uzbekistan	0–3		0–3	0–2	2–12	53–81	3
35	Chinese Taipei	0–3	3–0		1–1	7–7	59–71	2

== Uzbekistan vs. Chinese Taipei ==
Uzbekistan
0
Shenzhen Luohu Tennis Centre, Shenzhen, China
February 1, 2012
Hard (outdoors)

Chinese Taipei
3

			1	2	3
1	(Uzbekistan) (Chinese Taipei)	Sabina Sharipova; Hsieh Su-wei	3; 6	1; 6
2	(Uzbekistan) (Chinese Taipei)	Nigina Abduraimova; Chang Kai-chen	6; 0	4; 6	5; 7
3	(Uzbekistan) (Chinese Taipei)	Akgul Amanmuradova / Iroda Tulyaganova; Chan Yung-jan / Chuang Chia-jung	5; 7	6^{4} 7^{7}

== China vs. Chinese Taipei ==
China
3
Shenzhen Luohu Tennis Centre, Shenzhen, China
February 2, 2012
Hard (outdoors)

Chinese Taipei
0

			1	2	3
1	(China) (Chinese Taipei)	Zheng Jie; Hsieh Su-wei	6; 2	6; 3
2	(China) (Chinese Taipei)	Li Na; Chang Kai-chen	6; 2	6; 0
3	(China) (Chinese Taipei)	Peng Shuai / Zhang Shuai; Chan Yung-jan / Hsieh Su-wei	7; 5	4; 6	6; 2

== China vs. Uzbekistan ==
China
3
Shenzhen Luohu Tennis Centre, Shenzhen, China
February 3, 2012
Hard (outdoors)

Uzbekistan
0

			1	2	3
1	(China) (Uzbekistan)	Zhang Shuai; Sabina Sharipova	6^{5} 7^{7}	6; 3	6; 1
2	(China) (Uzbekistan)	Li Na; Nigina Abduraimova	6; 2	6; 3
3	(China) (Uzbekistan)	Peng Shuai / Zheng Jie; Akgul Amanmuradova / Iroda Tulyaganova	6; 3	6; 4
