= 2010 Fed Cup Asia/Oceania Zone Group I – Pool B =

Group B of the 2010 Fed Cup Asia/Oceania Zone Group I was one of two pools in the Asia/Oceania Zone Group I of the 2010 Fed Cup. Four teams competed in a round robin competition, with the top team and the bottom two teams proceeding to their respective sections of the play-offs: the top teams played for advancement to the World Group II Play-offs, while the bottom teams faced potential relegation to Group II.

		(Uzbekistan) UZB	(Chinese Taipei) TPE	(Thailand) THA	(Kazakhstan) KAZ	RR; W–L	Set; W–L	Game; W–L	Standings
21	Uzbekistan		1–2	0–3	1–2	0–3	5–14	69–102	4
26	Chinese Taipei	2–1		2–1	2–1	3–0	12–7	89–74	1
31	Thailand	3–0	1–2		1–2	1–2	10–9	86–79	3
41	Kazakhstan	2–1	1–2	2–1		2–1	11–9	96–85	2

== Uzbekistan vs. Thailand ==
Uzbekistan
0
National Tennis Centre, Kuala Lumpur, Malaysia
3 February 2010
Synpave (outdoors)

Thailand
3

			1	2	3
1	(Uzbekistan) (Thailand)	Sabina Sharipova; Suchanun Viratprasert	2; 6	2; 6
2	(Uzbekistan) (Thailand)	Akgul Amanmuradova; Tamarine Tanasugarn	5; 7	1; 6
3	(Uzbekistan) (Thailand)	Nigina Abduraimova / Albina Khabibulina; Nudnida Luangnam / Varatchaya Wongteanchai	3; 6	7; 5	2; 6

== Chinese Taipei vs. Kazakhstan ==
Chinese Taipei
2
National Tennis Centre, Kuala Lumpur, Malaysia
3 February 2010
Synpave (outdoors)

Kazakhstan
1

			1	2	3
1	(Chinese Taipei) (Kazakhstan)	Chang Kai-chen; Sesil Karatantcheva	4; 6	3; 6
2	(Chinese Taipei) (Kazakhstan)	Chan Yung-jan; Yaroslava Shvedova	6; 3	6; 4
3	(Chinese Taipei) (Kazakhstan)	Chuang Chia-jung / Hsieh Su-wei; Yaroslava Shvedova / Galina Voskoboeva	6; 3	2; 6	7^{8} 6^{6}

== Uzbekistan vs. Chinese Taipei ==
Uzbekistan
1
National Tennis Centre, Kuala Lumpur, Malaysia
4 February 2010
Synpave (outdoors)

Chinese Taipei
2

			1	2	3
1	(Uzbekistan) (Chinese Taipei)	Albina Khabibulina; Chang Kai-chen	2; 6	2; 6
2	(Uzbekistan) (Chinese Taipei)	Akgul Amanmuradova; Chan Yung-jan	6; 2	6; 2
3	(Uzbekistan) (Chinese Taipei)	Akgul Amanmuradova / Albina Khabibulina; Chuang Chia-jung / Hsieh Su-wei	3; 6	2; 6

== Thailand vs. Kazakhstan ==
Thailand
2
National Tennis Centre, Kuala Lumpur, Malaysia
4 February 2010
Synpave (outdoors)

Kazakhstan
1

			1	2	3
1	(Thailand) (Kazakhstan)	Suchanun Viratprasert; Sesil Karatantcheva	4; 6	3; 6
2	(Thailand) (Kazakhstan)	Tamarine Tanasugarn; Yaroslava Shvedova	6; 3	6; 4
3	(Thailand) (Kazakhstan)	Tamarine Tanasugarn / Varatchaya Wongteanchai; Yaroslava Shvedova / Galina Voskoboeva	6; 3	2; 6	7^{8} 6^{6}

== Uzbekistan vs. Kazakhstan ==
Uzbekistan
1
National Tennis Centre, Kuala Lumpur, Malaysia
5 February 2010
Synpave (outdoors)

Kazakhstan
2

			1	2	3
1	(Uzbekistan) (Kazakhstan)	Nigina Abduraimova; Sesil Karatantcheva	2; 6	2; 6
2	(Uzbekistan) (Kazakhstan)	Akgul Amanmuradova; Galina Voskoboeva	6; 3	6; 4
3	(Uzbekistan) (Kazakhstan)	Akgul Amanmuradova / Albina Khabibulina; Yaroslava Shvedova / Galina Voskoboeva	4; 6	6^{4} 7^{7}

== Chinese Taipei vs. Thailand ==
Chinese Taipei
2
National Tennis Centre, Kuala Lumpur, Malaysia
5 February 2010
Synpave (outdoors)

Thailand
1

			1	2	3
1	(Chinese Taipei) (Thailand)	Chang Kai-chen; Suchanun Viratprasert	6; 1	6; 0
2	(Chinese Taipei) (Thailand)	Chan Yung-jan; Tamarine Tanasugarn	0; 6	2; 6
3	(Chinese Taipei) (Thailand)	Chuang Chia-jung / Hsieh Su-wei; Tamarine Tanasugarn / Varatchaya Wongteanchai	6; 0	7^{7} 6^{2}

== See also ==
- Fed Cup structure
