= 2010 Fed Cup Asia/Oceania Zone Group II – Pool A =

Group A of the 2010 Fed Cup Asia/Oceania Zone Group II was one of two pools in the Asia/Oceania Zone Group II of the 2010 Fed Cup. Three teams competed in a round robin competition, with the teams proceeding to their respective sections of the play-offs: the top team played for advancement to the 2011 Group I.

		(India) IND	(Singapore) SIN	(Malaysia) MAS	RR; W–L	Set; W–L	Game; W–L	Standings
43	India		2–1	3–0	2–0	12–0	73–20	1
61	Singapore	0–3		1–2	0–2	2–10	28–65	3
	Malaysia	0–3	2–1		1–1	4–8	40–56	2

== Singapore vs. Malaysia ==
Singapore
1
National Tennis Centre, Kuala Lumpur, Malaysia
3 February 2010
Synpave (outdoors)

Malaysia
2

			1	2	3
1	(Singapore) (Malaysia)	Julienne Si Ying Keong; Khoo Chin-bee	1; 6	0; 6
2	(Singapore) (Malaysia)	Stefanie Tan; Jawairiah Noordin	6; 2	6; 3
3	(Singapore) (Malaysia)	Clare Fong / Stefanie Tan; Khoo Chin-bee / Jawairiah Noordin	4; 6	2; 6

== India vs. Singapore ==
India
3
National Tennis Centre, Kuala Lumpur, Malaysia
4 February 2010
Synpave (outdoors)

Singapore
0

			1	2	3
1	(India) (Singapore)	Poojashree Venkatesha; Julienne Si Ying Keong	6; 1	6; 1
2	(India) (Singapore)	Sania Mirza; Stefanie Tan	6; 2	6; 3
3	(India) (Singapore)	Sanaa Bhambri / Rushmi Chakravarthi; Clare Fong / Stefanie Tan	6; 0	6; 2

== India vs. Malaysia ==
India
3
National Tennis Centre, Kuala Lumpur, Malaysia
5 February 2010
Synpave (outdoors)

Malaysia
0

			1	2	3
1	(India) (Malaysia)	Poojashree Venkatesha; Khoo Chin-bee	6; 1	6; 1
2	(India) (Malaysia)	Sania Mirza; Jawairiah Noordin	6; 1	6; 0
3	(India) (Malaysia)	Sanaa Bhambri / Poojashree Venkatesha; Khoo Chin-bee / Jawairiah Noordin	7^{7} 6^{4}	6; 2

== See also ==
- Fed Cup structure
