= Saba Aziz =

Pakistani tennis player (born 1988)

- Country (sports): Pakistan
- Born: 26 November 1988 (age 37) Lahore, Pakistan
- Turned pro: 2008
- Plays: Right Handed (Double Handed Backhand)

Saba Aziz (born 26 November 1988) is a former Pakistan number one women's tennis player. She represented Pakistan in Fed Cup from 2011-2013.

In 2011, she along with Sarah Mahboob Khan, Ushna Suhail and Sara Mansoor made history as Pakistan re-entered the Fed Cup competition after a decade of absence.

Saba became the first Pakistani female tennis player to win an ITF Futures main draw match and earn a ranking point in 2008. On the ITF junior circuit, she was ranked as high as 457 in the world.

Winner of multiple national titles, Saba was the ladies singles champion at the National Shalimar Women Ranking Tennis Tournament (Rawalpindi May '13), ladies singles champion at the IC Open National Ranking Tennis Championship (Karachi Feb. '12), ladies singles and mixed doubles champion at the UBL International Hard Court Tennis Championship (Karachi Dec’11); ladies singles champion at the 10th National Bank Subh-e-Nau Ladies & Juniors Tennis Championship (Karachi Oct ’11); ladies singles champion at the 27th Federal Cup National Ranking Tennis Championships (Islamabad Oct ’11); ladies singles champion at the 1st Aisam-ul-Haq Masters Tennis Championship (Islamabad July ’11) and the ladies singles champion at the Pakistan Open Tennis Championship (Karachi July ’09);.

Saba also won the ladies singles title at the QTF-Intercontinental Tennis Open (Doha, Qatar Nov.'12) and the ladies doubles title at the Smash Tennis Academy Championship (Doha, Qatar May '15).

In 2012, Saba was listed in Newsweek Pakistan's list of 100 women who matter.

In 2018, she was selected among the 150 leading women of the University of London since women gained access to higher education in the UK, the only Pakistani woman on the list.

Saba was also a Fulbright Scholar 2013 at Boston University.
