= 2012 Fed Cup Asia/Oceania Zone =

Subsection of tennis competition

The Asia/Oceania Zone was one of three zones of regional competition in the 2012 Fed Cup.

== Group I ==
- Venue: Shenzhen Luohu Tennis Centre, Shenzhen, China (outdoor hard)
- Date: Week of 30 January (ties played 1–4 February)

The seven teams were divided into two pools of three and four teams. The winners of both pools played off to decide which nation progresses to World Group II play-offs. Nations finished last in each pool play-off to determine which nation was relegated to Asia/Oceania Zone Group II for 2013.

=== Pools ===
	Pool A	CHN	TPE	UZB
1	China (2–0)		3–0	3–0
2	Chinese Taipei (1–1)	0–3		3–0
3	Uzbekistan (0–2)	0–3	0–3	

	Pool B	KAZ	THA	KOR	INA
1	Kazakhstan (3–0)		2–1	3–0	3–0
2	Thailand (2–1)	1–2		3–0	3–0
3	South Korea (1–2)	0–3	0–3		2–1
4	Indonesia (0–3)	0–3	0–3	1–2	

=== Play-offs ===
Placing	A Team	Score	B Team
Promotion	China	2–0	Kazakhstan
3rd–4th	Chinese Taipei	2–1	Thailand
5th–6th	N/A	–	South Korea
Relegation	Uzbekistan	3–0	Indonesia

- China advanced to World Group II play-offs.
- Indonesia was relegated to Asia/Oceania Group II in 2013.

== Group II ==
- Venue: Shenzhen Luohu Tennis Centre, Shenzhen, China (outdoor hard)
- Date: Week of 30 January

The ten teams were divided into two pools of five teams. The winners of both pools played off to decide which nation was promoted to the Asia/Oceania Zone Group I for 2013.

=== Pools ===
	Pool A	HKG	KGZ	SIN	PAK	SRI
1	Hong Kong (4–0)		2–1	3–0	3–0	3–0
2	Kyrgyzstan (3–1)	1–2		2–1	2–1	3–0
3	Singapore (1–3)	0–3	1–2		1–2	2–1
4	Pakistan (1–3)	0–3	1–2	2–1		1–2
5	Sri Lanka (1–3)	0–3	0–3	1–2	2–1	

	Pool B	IND	PHI	TKM	OMA	IRI
1	India (4–0)		2–1	2–1	2–1	3–0
2	Philippines (3–1)	1–2		3–0	3–0	3–0
3	Turkmenistan (2–2)	1–2	0–3		2–1	3–0
4	Oman (1–3)	1–2	0–3	1–2		2–1
5	Iran (0–4)	0–3	0–3	0–3	1–2	

=== Play-offs ===
Placing	A Team	Score	B Team
Promotion	Hong Kong	1–2	India
3rd–4th	Kyrgyzstan	1–2	Philippines
5th–6th	Singapore	0–3	Turkmenistan
7th–8th	Pakistan	1–2	Oman
9th–10th	Sri Lanka	3–0	Iran

- India promoted to Asia/Oceania Group I in 2013.

== See also ==
- Fed Cup structure
