= 2011 Fed Cup Asia/Oceania Zone =

Subsection of tennis competition

The Asia/Oceania Zone was one of three zones of regional competition in the 2011 Fed Cup.

== Group I ==
- Venue: National Tennis Centre, Nonthaburi, Thailand (hard, outdoors)
- Date: Week of 31 January (ties played 2–4 February)

The eight teams were divided into two pools of four teams. The winners of both pools played off to decide which nation progresses to World Group II play-offs. Nations finished fourth in each pool play-off to determine which nation was relegated to Asia/Oceania Zone Group II for 2012

=== Pools ===
	Pool A	UZB	THA	CHN	IND
1	Uzbekistan (2–1)		1–2	3–0	2–1
2	Thailand (2–1)	2–1		1–2	2–1
3	China (2–1)	0–3	2–1		2–1
4	India (0–3)	1–2	1–2	1–2	

	Pool B	JPN	KAZ	KOR	TPE
1	Japan (3–0)		2–1	3–0	3–0
2	Kazakhstan (2–1)	1–2		2–1	3–0
3	South Korea (1–2)	0–3	1–2		2–1
4	Chinese Taipei (0–3)	0–3	0–3	1–2	

=== Play-offs ===
Placing	A Team	Score	B Team
Promotion	Japan	3–0	Uzbekistan
3rd–4th	Thailand	3–0	Kazakhstan
5th–6th	China	1–2	South Korea
Relegation	India	1–2	Chinese Taipei

- Japan advanced to World Group II play-offs.
- India relegated to Asia/Oceania Group II in 2012.

== Group II ==
- Venue: National Tennis Centre, Nonthaburi, Thailand (hard, outdoors)
- Date: Week of 31 January (ties played 2–5 February)

The eight teams were divided into two pools of four teams. The winners of both pools played off to decide which nation was promoted to the Asia/Oceania Zone Group I for 2012.

=== Pools ===
	Pool A	INA	PHI	PAK	KGZ
1	Indonesia (3–0)		3–0	3–0	3–0
2	Philippines (2–1)	0–3		3–0	3–0
3	Pakistan (1–2)	0–3	0–3		2–1
4	Kyrgyzstan (0–3)	0–3	0–3	1–2	

	Pool B	HKG	SIN	TKM	OMA
1	Hong Kong (3–0)		3–0	3–0	3–0
2	Singapore (2–1)	0–3		2–1	2–1
3	Turkmenistan (1–2)	0–3	1–2		3–0
4	Oman (0–3)	0–3	1–2	0–3	

=== Play-offs ===
Placing	A Team	Score	B Team
Promotion	Indonesia	2–1	Hong Kong
3rd–4th	Philippines	2–1	Singapore
5th–6th	Pakistan	1–2	Turkmenistan
7th–8th	Kyrgyzstan	0–3	Oman

- Indonesia promoted to Asia/Oceania Group I in 2012.

== See also ==
- Fed Cup structure
