= 2012 Fed Cup World Group II play-offs =

Part of tennis tournament

The 2012 World Group II play-offs were four ties which involved the losing nations of the World Group II and four nations from the three Zonal Group I competitions. Nations that won their play-off ties entered the 2013 World Group II, while losing nations joined their respective zonal groups.

== France vs. Slovenia ==
France
5
Palais des Sports, Besançon, France
21–22 April 2012
Hard (indoors)

Slovenia
0

			1	2	3
1	(France) (Slovenia)	Virginie Razzano; Petra Rampre	2; 6	6; 4	6; 4
2	(France) (Slovenia)	Pauline Parmentier; Nastja Kolar	6; 2	6; 3
3	(France) (Slovenia)	Pauline Parmentier; Petra Rampre	6; 4	3; 6	8; 6
4	(France) (Slovenia)	Stéphanie Foretz Gacon; Nastja Kolar	7^{8} 6^{6}	7^{7} 6^{1}
5	(France) (Slovenia)	Kristina Mladenovic / Stéphanie Foretz Gacon; Petra Rampre / Katarina Srebotnik	6; 3	6; 4

== Switzerland vs. Belarus ==
Switzerland
4
Complexe Sportive des Iles Avenue des trois lacs, Yverdon-les-Bains, Switzerland
21–22 April 2012
Hard (indoors)

Belarus
1

			1	2	3
1	(Switzerland) (Belarus)	Timea Bacsinszky; Olga Govortsova	4; 6	4; 6
2	(Switzerland) (Belarus)	Stefanie Vögele; Aliaksandra Sasnovich	6; 0	5; 7	6; 3
3	(Switzerland) (Belarus)	Stefanie Vögele; Olga Govortsova	6; 1	6; 1
4	(Switzerland) (Belarus)	Timea Bacsinszky; Aliaksandra Sasnovich	6; 2	3; 6	6; 1
5	(Switzerland) (Belarus)	Belinda Bencic / Amra Sadiković; Darya Lebesheva / Aliaksandra Sasnovich	6^{5} 7^{7}	7^{9} 6^{7}	7; 5

== Sweden vs. Great Britain ==
Sweden
4
Borashallen, Borås, Sweden
21–22 April 2012
Hard (indoors)

Great Britain
1

			1	2	3
1	(Sweden) (United Kingdom)	Johanna Larsson; Elena Baltacha	6; 1	7; 5
2	(Sweden) (United Kingdom)	Sofia Arvidsson; Anne Keothavong	6; 1	6; 4
3	(Sweden) (United Kingdom)	Sofia Arvidsson; Laura Robson	6; 4	1; 6	6; 3
4	(Sweden) (United Kingdom)	Johanna Larsson; Anne Keothavong	7^{8} 6^{6}	3; 6	6; 4
5	(Sweden) (United Kingdom)	Ellen Allgurin / Hilda Melander; Elena Baltacha / Heather Watson	6^{3} 7^{7}	1; 6

== Argentina vs. China ==
Argentina
4
Parque Roca, Buenos Aires, Argentina
21–22 April 2012
Clay (outdoors)

China
1

			1	2	3
1	(Argentina) (China)	Paula Ormaechea; Zhou Yimiao	6; 2	6; 2
2	(Argentina) (China)	Florencia Molinero; Wang Qiang	6; 3	6; 4
3	(Argentina) (China)	Paula Ormaechea; Wang Qiang	6; 4	6; 2
4	(Argentina) (China)	Florencia Molinero; Zhou Yimiao	6^{1} 7^{7}	6; 2	3; 6
5	(Argentina) (China)	Mailen Auroux / María Irigoyen; Liang Chen / Liu Wanting	6; 3	6; 4

== See also ==
- Fed Cup structure
