= 2011 Fed Cup World Group II play-offs =

Part of tennis tournament

The 2011 World Group II play-offs were four ties which involved the losing nations of the World Group II and four nations from the three Zonal Group I competitions. Nations that won their play-off ties entered the 2012 World Group II, while losing nations joined their respective zonal groups.

== Belarus vs. Estonia ==
Belarus
5
Minsk Sports Palace, Minsk, Belarus
16–17 April 2011
Acrylic hard (indoors)

Estonia
0

			1	2	3
1	(Belarus) (Estonia)	Victoria Azarenka; Anett Kontaveit	6; 2	6; 0
2	(Belarus) (Estonia)	Olga Govortsova; Margit Rüütel	6; 0	6; 0
3	(Belarus) (Estonia)	Darya Kustova; Maret Ani	6; 3	6; 1
4	(Belarus) (Estonia)	Olga Govortsova; Anett Kontaveit	6; 0	6; 2
5	(Belarus) (Estonia)	Darya Kustova / Tatiana Poutchek; Maret Ani / Anett Kontaveit	6; 2	6; 3

- Note: This match broke the Fed Cup record for the most decisive win, with Estonia winning only thirteen games.

== Japan vs. Argentina ==
Japan
4
Bourbon Beans Dome, Kobe, Japan
16–17 July 2011
Decoturf (indoors)

Argentina
0

			1	2	3
1	(Japan) (Argentina)	Misaki Doi; María Irigoyen	6; 0	6; 0
2	(Japan) (Argentina)	Ayumi Morita; Mailen Auroux	6; 2	6; 3
3	(Japan) (Argentina)	Ayumi Morita; Aranza Salut	6; 2	6; 1
4	(Japan) (Argentina)	Misaki Doi; Mailen Auroux				not played
5	(Japan) (Argentina)	Rika Fujiwara / Kurumi Nara; Mailen Auroux / María Irigoyen	6; 1	6; 3

- Note: This tie was scheduled to be played 16 April and 17 April 2011, but was postponed due to the 2011 Tōhoku earthquake and tsunami

== Slovenia vs. Canada ==
Slovenia
3
Teniski Klub Koper, Koper, Slovenia
16–17 April 2011
Red clay (outdoors)

Canada
2

			1	2	3
1	(Slovenia) (Canada)	Maša Zec Peškirič; Rebecca Marino	3; 6	5; 7
2	(Slovenia) (Canada)	Polona Hercog; Eugenie Bouchard	6; 0	6; 4
3	(Slovenia) (Canada)	Polona Hercog; Rebecca Marino	5; 7	6; 2	8; 6
4	(Slovenia) (Canada)	Maša Zec Peškirič; Eugenie Bouchard	4; 6	1; 6
5	(Slovenia) (Canada)	Polona Hercog / Katarina Srebotnik; Rebecca Marino / Sharon Fichman	7^{7} 6^{5}	6; 2

== Switzerland vs. Sweden ==
Switzerland
4
TC Lido Lugano, Lugano, Switzerland
16–17 April 2011
Clay (outdoors)

Sweden
1

			1	2	3
1	(Switzerland) (Sweden)	Timea Bacsinszky; Johanna Larsson	7^{7} 6^{2}	6; 1
2	(Switzerland) (Sweden)	Patty Schnyder; Sofia Arvidsson	6; 1	6; 0
3	(Switzerland) (Sweden)	Patty Schnyder; Johanna Larsson	3; 6	7; 5	6; 2
4	(Switzerland) (Sweden)	Timea Bacsinszky; Sofia Arvidsson	6; 3	6; 1
5	(Switzerland) (Sweden)	Stefanie Vögele / Amra Sadiković; Anna Brazhnikova / Sandra Roma	5; 7	4; 6

== See also ==
- Fed Cup structure
