= 2011 Toray Pan Pacific Open – Singles qualifying =

This article displays the women singles qualifying draw of the 2011 Toray Pan Pacific Open.

== Players ==
=== Seeds ===
1. (Germany) Angelique Kerber (qualified)
2. (United States) CoCo Vandeweghe (qualified)
3. (Poland) Urszula Radwańska (qualified)
4. (France) Aravane Rezaï (qualifying competition)
5. (United States) Jill Craybas (qualified)
6. (China) Zhang Shuai (moved to the main draw)
7. (Australia) Anastasia Rodionova (qualified)
8. (Japan) Erika Sema (qualified)
9. (Ukraine) Tetiana Luzhanska (withdrew due to right thigh strain)
10. (Chinese Taipei) Chang Kai-chen (qualifying competition)
11. (Luxembourg) Mandy Minella (qualified)
12. (Romania) Mădălina Gojnea (first round)
13. (Kazakhstan) Zarina Diyas (qualifying competition)
14. (Czech Republic) Karolína Plíšková (qualified)
15. (Japan) Junri Namigata (first round)
16. (Japan) Rika Fujiwara (qualifying competition)
17. (Japan) Yurika Sema (first round)
18. (Japan) Kumiko Iijima (qualifying competition)

=== Qualifiers ===
1. (Germany) Angelique Kerber
2. (United States) CoCo Vandeweghe
3. (Poland) Urszula Radwańska
4. (Luxembourg) Mandy Minella
5. (United States) Jill Craybas
6. (Czech Republic) Karolína Plíšková
7. (Australia) Anastasia Rodionova
8. (Japan) Erika Sema

== Qualifying draw ==
=== First qualifier ===
First round
1	(Germany) Angelique Kerber	6	6
(Japan) Erika Takao	2	3
WC	(Japan) Remi Tezuka	6	6^{2}	1
10	(Chinese Taipei) Chang Kai-chen	3	7^{7}	6

Qualifying competition
1	(Germany) Angelique Kerber	6	7
10	(Chinese Taipei) Chang Kai-chen	1	5

=== Second qualifier ===
First round
2	(United States) CoCo Vandeweghe	6	6
(Japan) Aiko Nakamura	3	2
(United States) Abigail Spears	7	0	6
12	(Romania) Mădălina Gojnea	5	6	2

Qualifying competition
2	(United States) CoCo Vandeweghe	4	6	6
(United States) Abigail Spears	6	4	3

=== Third qualifier ===
First round
3	(Poland) Urszula Radwańska	6	6
WC	(Japan) Riko Sawayanagi	4	4
WC	(Japan) Natsumi Hamamura	2	2
16	(Japan) Rika Fujiwara	6	6

Qualifying competition
3	(Poland) Urszula Radwańska	4	6	6
16	(Japan) Rika Fujiwara	6	2	1

=== Fourth qualifier ===
First round
4	(France) Aravane Rezaï	6	2	6
WC	(Japan) Miyu Kato	1	6	4
WC	(Japan) Risa Ozaki	2	6^{4}
11	(Luxembourg) Mandy Minella	6	7^{7}

Qualifying competition
4	(France) Aravane Rezaï	7	5	3
11	(Luxembourg) Mandy Minella	5	7	6

=== Fifth qualifier ===
First round
5	(United States) Jill Craybas	7	6
(Japan) Sachie Ishizu	5	0
(Japan) Ryōko Fuda	6	6
15	(Japan) Junri Namigata	4	4

Qualifying competition
5	(United States) Jill Craybas	6	7
(Japan) Ryōko Fuda	1	5

=== Sixth qualifier ===
First round
18	(Japan) Kumiko Iijima	6	6
WC	(Japan) Akiko Yonemura	1	1
WC	(Japan) Shuko Aoyama	2	2
14	(Czech Republic) Karolína Plíšková	6	6

Qualifying competition
18	(Japan) Kumiko Iijima	2	1
14	(Czech Republic) Karolína Plíšková	6	6

=== Seventh qualifier ===
First round
7	(Australia) Anastasia Rodionova	6	6
WC	(Japan) Ayumi Oka	2	0
WC	(Japan) Akari Inoue	2	3
13	(Kazakhstan) Zarina Diyas	6	6

Qualifying competition
7	(Australia) Anastasia Rodionova	6	6
13	(Kazakhstan) Zarina Diyas	1	0

=== Eighth qualifier ===
First round
8	(Japan) Erika Sema	6	6
(Japan) Misa Eguchi	4	1
WC	(United States) Raquel Kops-Jones	6	6
17	(Japan) Yurika Sema	1	3

Qualifying competition
8	(Japan) Erika Sema	1	6	6
WC	(United States) Raquel Kops-Jones	6	1	4
