= 2003 Toray Pan Pacific Open – Singles =

Singles
- 2003 Toray Pan Pacific Open

Final
- Champion: (United States) Lindsay Davenport
- Runner-up: (United States) Monica Seles
- Score: 6–7^{(6–8)}, 6–1, 6–2

Details
- Draw: 28 (4 Q / 3 WC )
- Seeds: 8

Events
Singles	Doubles
← 2002 ·	Pan Pacific Open	· 2004 →

Lindsay Davenport defeated Monica Seles in the final, 6–7^{(6–8)}, 6–1, 6–2 to win the singles tennis title at the 2003 Pan Pacific Open. It was her first title of the season, and the 38th of her career.

Martina Hingis was the reigning champion, but did not compete this year. Hingis would retire from professional tennis one month later.

== Seeds ==
The first four seeds received a bye into the second round.

1. (United States) Monica Seles (final)
2. (Federal Republic of Yugoslavia) Jelena Dokic (quarterfinals)
3. (United States) Lindsay Davenport (champion)
4. (United States) Chanda Rubin (semifinals)
5. (Bulgaria) Magdalena Maleeva (second round)
6. (Italy) Silvia Farina Elia (second round)
7. (Israel) Anna Pistolesi (first round)
8. (Russia) Elena Dementieva (quarterfinals)

== Draw ==
=== Key ===
- Q = Qualifier
- WC = Wild card
- LL = Lucky loser
- Alt = Alternate
- ITF = ITF entry
- PR = Protected ranking
- SR = Special ranking
- SE = Special exempt
- JE = Junior exempt
- JR = Junior Accelerator Programme entrant
- CO = College Accelerator Programme entrant
- NG = Next Gen Accelerator Program entrant
- w/o = Walkover
- r = Retired
- d = Defaulted

=== Finals ===
Semifinals
1	(United States) Monica Seles	4	6	6
4	(United States) Chanda Rubin	6	4	2
3	(United States) Lindsay Davenport	3	6	6
(United States) Lisa Raymond	6	1	4

Final
1	(United States) Monica Seles	7^{8}	1	2
3	(United States) Lindsay Davenport	6^{6}	6	6

=== Top half ===
First round
Q	(Italy) R Grande	1	6	2
(Japan) A Sugiyama	6	4	6
PR	(Russia) N Petrova	6	3	3
Q	(Russia) L Krasnoroutskaya	3	6	6
(Russia) E Bovina	6	3	6
7	(Israel) A Pistolesi	2	6	3
(South Africa) A Coetzer	4	5
(Slovenia) K Srebotnik	6	7
(Russia) T Panova	0	3
Q	(France) S Cohen-Aloro	6	6
(United States) M Shaughnessy	5	2
8	(Russia) E Dementieva	7	6

Second round
1	(United States) M Seles	7	5	6
(Japan) A Sugiyama	5	7	1
Q	(Russia) L Krasnoroutskaya	6^{10}	7^{9}	6
(Russia) E Bovina	7^{12}	6^{7}	2
4	(United States) C Rubin	6	6
(Slovenia) K Srebotnik	4	0
Q	(France) S Cohen-Aloro	2	2
8	(Russia) E Dementieva	6	6

Quarterfinals
1	(United States) M Seles	6	6
Q	(Russia) L Krasnoroutskaya	4	4
4	(United States) C Rubin	3	6	6
8	(Russia) E Dementieva	6	1	3

Semifinals
1	(United States) M Seles	4	6	6
4	(United States) C Rubin	6	4	2

=== Bottom half ===
First round
6	(Italy) S Farina Elia	3	6	6
WC	(France) M Pierce	6	1	0
(Argentina) C Fernández	6^{1}	2
(Thailand) T Tanasugarn	7^{7}	6
(United States) A Stevenson	3	3
(Croatia) I Majoli	6	6
5	(Bulgaria) M Maleeva	6	6
WC	(Japan) S Obata	3	3
(Argentina) P Suárez	1	6	5
(United States) L Raymond	6	4	7
WC	(Indonesia) A Widjaja	6	6
Q	(South Korea) M-r Jeon	3	3

Second round
6	(Italy) S Farina Elia	7^{7}	5	1
(Thailand) T Tanasugarn	6^{4}	7	6
(Croatia) I Majoli	4	4
3	(United States) L Davenport	6	6
5	(Bulgaria) M Maleeva	6	6^{7}	2
(United States) L Raymond	2	7^{9}	6
WC	(Indonesia) A Widjaja	6^{4}	4
2	(Federal Republic of Yugoslavia) J Dokic	7^{7}	6

Quarterfinals
(Thailand) T Tanasugarn	5	6^{3}
3	(United States) L Davenport	7	7^{7}
(United States) L Raymond	6	6
2	(Federal Republic of Yugoslavia) J Dokic	4	2

Semifinals
3	(United States) L Davenport	3	6	6
(United States) L Raymond	6	1	4

== Qualifying ==
=== Qualifying seeds ===
1. (Russia) Elena Likhovtseva (second round)
2. (Czech Republic) Dája Bedáňová (second round)
3. (United States) Laura Granville (second round)
4. (Italy) Rita Grande (qualified)
5. (United States) Jill Craybas (first round)
6. (Zimbabwe) Cara Black (first round)
7. (South Korea) Cho Yoon-jeong (qualifying competition)
8. (Belgium) Els Callens (qualifying competition)

=== Qualifiers ===
1. (South Korea) Jeon Mi-ra
2. (Russia) Lina Krasnoroutskaya
3. (France) Stéphanie Cohen-Aloro
4. (Italy) Rita Grande

=== Qualifying draw ===
==== First qualifier ====
First round
1	(Russia) Elena Likhovtseva	6	6
(Japan) Rika Fujiwara	4	1
WC	(Japan) Haruka Inoue	2	0
(Netherlands) Kristie Boogert	6	6
(South Korea) Jeon Mi-ra	6	7
(Japan) Akiko Kinebuchi	4	5
(Kazakhstan) Irina Selyutina	6	7
5	(United States) Jill Craybas	3	5

Second round
1	(Russia) Elena Likhovtseva	2	6	3
(Netherlands) Kristie Boogert	6	1	6
(South Korea) Jeon Mi-ra	7	6
(Kazakhstan) Irina Selyutina	5	2

Qualifying competition
(Netherlands) Kristie Boogert	6	3	5
(South Korea) Jeon Mi-ra	2	6	7

==== Second qualifier ====
First round
2	(Czech Republic) Dája Bedáňová	6	7^{12}
(Venezuela) María Vento-Kabchi	4	6^{10}
(Japan) Remi Tezuka	2	1
(Russia) Lina Krasnoroutskaya	6	6
(Indonesia) Wynne Prakusya	3	3
(United States) Sarah Taylor	6	6
(Japan) Akiko Morigami	6	6
6	(Zimbabwe) Cara Black	4	4

Second round
2	(Czech Republic) Dája Bedáňová	1	3
(Russia) Lina Krasnoroutskaya	6	6
(United States) Sarah Taylor	6	6
(Japan) Akiko Morigami	2	4

Qualifying competition
(Russia) Lina Krasnoroutskaya	6	6
(United States) Sarah Taylor	0	3

==== Third qualifier ====
First round
3	(United States) Laura Granville	7	6
(Japan) Aiko Nakamura	5	2
(Japan) Shiho Hisamatsu	3	2
(France) Stéphanie Cohen-Aloro	6	6
WC	(Japan) Shizu Katsumi	1	2
(Japan) Seiko Okamoto	6	6
WC	(Japan) Maika Ozaki	2	2
8	(Belgium) Els Callens	6	6

Second round
3	(United States) Laura Granville	6^{1}	4
(France) Stéphanie Cohen-Aloro	7^{7}	6
(Japan) Seiko Okamoto	3	1
8	(Belgium) Els Callens	6	6

Qualifying competition
(France) Stéphanie Cohen-Aloro	7	6
8	(Belgium) Els Callens	5	4

==== Fourth qualifier ====
First round
4	(Italy) Rita Grande	6	6
(Chinese Taipei) Janet Lee	3	3
(United States) Diana Ospina	2	6	6
WC	(Japan) Maiko Inoue	6	4	2
(South Korea) Kim Jin-hee	6	4	6
(Japan) Chisayo Ito	1	6	1
(Hungary) Katalin Marosi	3	7^{7}	2
7	(South Korea) Cho Yoon-jeong	6	6^{3}	6

Second round
4	(Italy) Rita Grande	6	6
(United States) Diana Ospina	1	3
(South Korea) Kim Jin-hee	0	2
7	(South Korea) Cho Yoon-jeong	6	6

Qualifying competition
4	(Italy) Rita Grande	6	6
7	(South Korea) Cho Yoon-jeong	4	3
