= 2003 Toray Pan Pacific Open – Doubles =

Doubles
- 2003 Toray Pan Pacific Open

Final
- Champions: (Russia) Elena Bovina (Australia) Rennae Stubbs
- Runners-up: (United States) Lindsay Davenport (United States) Lisa Raymond
- Score: 6–3, 6–4

Details
- Draw: 16 (2WC/1Q)
- Seeds: 4

Events
Singles	Doubles
← 2002 ·	Pan Pacific Open	· 2004 →

Lisa Raymond and Rennae Stubbs were the defending champions and both players played in the final, but with different partners.

Stubbs (partnering Elena Bovina) won the title by defeating Raymond (partnering Lindsay Davenport) 6–3, 6–4 in the final. It was the 7th title for Bovina and the 40th title for Stubbs in their respective doubles careers.

== Seeds ==
1. (Zimbabwe) Cara Black / (Russia) Elena Likhovtseva (quarterfinals)
2. (United States) Meghann Shaughnessy / (Japan) Ai Sugiyama (semifinals)
3. (Russia) Elena Bovina / (Australia) Rennae Stubbs (champions)
4. (Federal Republic of Yugoslavia) Jelena Dokic / (Russia) Nadia Petrova (quarterfinals)

== Draw ==
=== Key ===
- Q = Qualifier
- WC = Wild card
- LL = Lucky loser
- Alt = Alternate
- ITF = ITF entry
- PR = Protected ranking
- SR = Special ranking
- SE = Special exempt
- JE = Junior exempt
- JR = Junior Accelerator Programme entrant
- CO = College Accelerator Programme entrant
- NG = Next Gen Accelerator Program entrant
- w/o = Walkover
- r = Retired
- d = Defaulted

=== Draw ===
First round
1	(Zimbabwe) C Black (Russia) E Likhovtseva	6	6
Q	(Argentina) C Fernández (Hungary) K Marosi	3	3
(Kazakhstan) I Selyutina (Indonesia) A Widjaja	0	2
(United States) L Davenport (United States) L Raymond	6	6
4	(Federal Republic of Yugoslavia) J Dokic (Russia) N Petrova	6	6
(Russia) E Dementieva (Italy) S Farina Elia	2	2
(Slovenia) T Križan (Slovenia) K Srebotnik	7^{7}	6
(Belgium) E Callens (Japan) R Fujiwara	6^{1}	3
(Russia) L Krasnoroutskaya (Russia) T Panova	7	3	6^{4}
(Chinese Taipei) J Lee (Indonesia) W Prakusya	5	6	7^{7}
WC	(Croatia) I Majoli (United States) M Seles	6	1	6^{3}
3	(Russia) E Bovina (Australia) R Stubbs	3	6	7^{7}
(Italy) R Grande (Venezuela) M Vento-Kabchi	3
(Czech Republic) D Bedáňová (Bulgaria) M Maleeva	2	r
WC	(Japan) A Morigami (Japan) S Obata	1	6^{5}
2	(United States) M Shaughnessy (Japan) A Sugiyama	6	7^{7}

Quarterfinals
1	(Zimbabwe) C Black (Russia) E Likhovtseva	3	2
(United States) L Davenport (United States) L Raymond	6	6
4	(Federal Republic of Yugoslavia) J Dokic (Russia) N Petrova	6^{5}	6^{5}
(Slovenia) T Križan (Slovenia) K Srebotnik	7^{7}	7^{7}
(Chinese Taipei) J Lee (Indonesia) W Prakusya	0	6	2
3	(Russia) E Bovina (Australia) R Stubbs	6	1	6
(Italy) R Grande (Venezuela) M Vento-Kabchi	3	3
2	(United States) M Shaughnessy (Japan) A Sugiyama	6	6

Semifinals
(United States) L Davenport (United States) L Raymond	6	6
(Slovenia) T Križan (Slovenia) K Srebotnik	3	3
3	(Russia) E Bovina (Australia) R Stubbs	6	6
2	(United States) M Shaughnessy (Japan) A Sugiyama	2	3

Final
(United States) L Davenport (United States) L Raymond	3	4
3	(Russia) E Bovina (Australia) R Stubbs	6	6

== Qualifying ==
=== Qualifying seeds ===
1. (Argentina) Clarisa Fernández / (Hungary) Katalin Marosi (qualified)
2. (Japan) Seiko Okamoto / (Japan) Ayami Takase (qualifying competition)

=== Qualifiers ===
1. (Argentina) Clarisa Fernández / (Hungary) Katalin Marosi

=== Qualifying draw ===
First round			Qualifying competition
			1	(Argentina) Clarisa Fernández (Hungary) Katalin Marosi	6	6
			2	(Japan) Seiko Okamoto (Japan) Ayami Takase	1	2
	(Japan) Haruka Inoue (Japan) Maiko Inoue	6	2	(Japan) Seiko Okamoto (Japan) Ayami Takase	1	2
2	(Japan) Seiko Okamoto (Japan) Ayami Takase	8
