= Yonemura =

Yonemura (written: 米村 lit. "rice plant village") is a Japanese surname. Notable people with the surname include:

- Akiko Yonemura (born 1984), Japanese tennis player
- Shoji Yonemura (米村 正二), Japanese writer
- Tomoko Yonemura (米村 知子) (born 1982), Japanese tennis player
