= Keiko Taguchi =

Japanese tennis player (born 1979)

- Country (sports): Japan
- Born: 26 February 1979 (age 46)
- Prize money: $40,467

Singles
- Highest ranking: No. 438 (24 July 2006)

Doubles
- Career titles: 12 ITF
- Highest ranking: No. 242 (18 December 2006)

Keiko Taguchi (born 26 February 1979) is a Japanese former professional tennis player.

Taguchi, who won 12 ITF doubles titles, made her only WTA Tour main draw appearance at the 2006 Japan Open, where she partnered with Ayami Takase in the doubles.

== ITF finals ==
$25,000 tournaments
$10,000 tournaments

=== Singles: 1 (0–1) ===
Outcome	No.	Date	Tournament	Surface	Opponent	Score
Runner-up	1.	20 November 2000	Kōfu, Japan	Carpet	(Japan) Seiko Okamoto	1–4, 3–1, 1–4, 3–5

=== Doubles: 19 (12–7) ===
Outcome	No.	Date	Tournament	Surface	Partner	Opponents	Score
Runner-up	1.	23 November 1998	Nagasaki, Japan	Grass	(Japan) Seiko Okamoto	(Japan) Akiko Gunji (Japan) Keiko Ishida	2–6, 2–6
Winner	1.	6 June 1999	Little Rock, United States	Hard	(Japan) Seiko Okamoto	(South Korea) Chang Kyung-mi (South Korea) Chae Kyung-yee	7–5, 6–2
Winner	2.	28 November 1999	Kōfu, Japan	Carpet	(Japan) Seiko Okamoto	(Japan) Remi Tezuka (Japan) Maki Arai	7–6, 0–6, 7–5
Winner	3.	13 November 2000	Haibara, Japan	Clay	(Japan) Seiko Okamoto	(Japan) Akiko Gunji (Japan) Keiko Ishida	2–4, 4–0, 5–3, 3–5, 4–2
Winner	4.	20 November 2000	Kōfu, Japan	Carpet	(Japan) Seiko Okamoto	(Japan) Kumiko Iijima (Japan) Maki Arai	3–5, 4–1, 5–4, 4–1
Runner-up	2.	1 September 2002	Ibaraki, Japan	Hard	(Japan) Yumiko Kitamura	(Japan) Kaori Aoyama (Japan) Maki Arai	6–4, 1–6, 2–6
Runner-up	3.	10 September 2002	Hiroshima, Japan	Clay	(Japan) Maiko Inoue	(Sweden) Helena Ejeson (Denmark) Andrea Munch-Hermansen	6–3, 3–6, 2–6
Runner-up	4.	21 October 2002	Tokyo, Japan	Hard	(Japan) Nami Urabe	(Japan) Haruka Inoue (Japan) Maiko Inoue	1–6, 2–6
Winner	5.	1 September 2003	Ibaraki, Japan	Hard	(Japan) Shizu Katsumi	(South Korea) Chang Kyung-mi (Japan) Ryoko Takemura	1–6, 7–6^{(3)}, 6–2
Winner	6.	12 April 2004	Yamaguchi, Japan	Clay	(Japan) Chie Nagano	(Japan) Hiroko Komori (Japan) Tomoko Sugano	6–4, 6–1
Winner	7.	20 April 2004	Hamanako, Japan	Carpet	(South Korea) Kim Hea-mi	(Chinese Taipei) Chen Yi (Chinese Taipei) Chan Chin-wei	6–1, 6–1
Winner	8.	5 September 2004	Saitama, Japan	Hard	(South Korea) Kim Hea-mi	(Japan) Tomoko Taira (Japan) Akiko Yonemura	6–4, 6–0
Winner	9.	21 September 2004	Hiroshima, Japan	Grass	(South Korea) Kim Hea-mi	(Japan) Tomoko Dokei (Japan) Yukiko Yabe	6–4, 6–2
Winner	10.	28 February 2005	Warrnambool, Australia	Grass	(South Korea) Kim Hea-mi	(Australia) Lucia Gonzalez (Australia) Christina Horiatopoulos	7–6^{(7)}, 7–5
Runner-up	5.	29 May 2005	Nagano, Japan	Carpet	(South Korea) Kim Hea-mi	(Japan) Ryoko Takemura (Japan) Tomoko Yonemura	1–6, 6–7^{(5)}
Winner	11.	7 September 2005	Kyoto, Japan	Carpet	(South Korea) Kim Hea-mi	(Japan) Eriko Mizuno (Japan) Tomoyo Takagishi	4–6, 6–0, 6–1
Winner	12.	6 June 2006	Tokyo, Japan	Hard	(Japan) Shizu Katsumi	(Japan) Reina Ishihara (Japan) Atsumi Koga	6–4, 6–2
Runner-up	6.	22 October 2006	Makinohara, Japan	Carpet	(South Korea) Kim Hea-mi	(Chinese Taipei) Hsieh Su-wei (Japan) Kumiko Iijima	3–6, 6–4, 0–6
Runner-up	7.	7 November 2006	Jakarta, Indonesia	Hard	(South Korea) Kim Hea-mi	(Indonesia) Romana Tedjakusuma (Indonesia) Angelique Widjaja	w/o
