= Haibara =

Haibara may refer to:

- Haibara, Nara
- Haibara, Shizuoka
- Haibara District, Shizuoka
