= Keiko Ishida =

Japanese tennis player (born 1973)

- Country (sports): Japan
- Born: 3 April 1973 (age 52)
- Prize money: $38,500

Singles
- Highest ranking: No. 349 (20 July 1998)

Doubles
- Career titles: 13 ITF
- Highest ranking: No. 138 (27 July 1998)

Keiko Ishida (born 3 April 1973) is a Japanese former professional tennis player.

Ishida reached a best singles ranking of 349 on the professional tour and featured in the main draw of the WTA Tour tournament at Nagoya in 1995. As a doubles player she had a best ranking of 138 in the world and won 13 ITF events.

== ITF finals ==
$25,000 tournaments
$10,000 tournaments

=== Singles: 3 (0–3) ===
Outcome	No.	Date	Tournament	Surface	Opponent	Score
Runner-up	1.	13 October 1997	Haibara, Japan	Grass	(Japan) Ryoko Takemura	6–3, 4–6, 4–6
Runner-up	2.	16 November 1998	Haibara, Japan	Clay	(Japan) Maiko Inoue	4–6, 3–6
Runner-up	3.	13 November 2000	Haibara, Japan	Clay	(Japan) Sachie Umehara	2–4, 0–4, 3–5

=== Doubles: 22 (13–9) ===
Outcome	No.	Date	Tournament	Surface	Partner	Opponents	Score
Runner-up	1.	10 August 1992	Taipei, Taiwan	Hard	(Japan) Nao Akahori	(Chinese Taipei) Lin Ya-hui (Chinese Taipei) Weng Tzu-ting	4–6, 1–6
Winner	1.	11 October 1993	Kuroshio, Japan	Hard	(Japan) Fumiko Yamazaki	(Japan) Keiko Nagatomi (Japan) Madoka Kuki	6–2, 6–0
Runner-up	2.	14 February 1994	Faro, Portugal	Hard	(Japan) Yoriko Yamagishi	(Bulgaria) Antoaneta Pandjerova (Bulgaria) Teodora Nedeva	1–6, 3–6
Runner-up	3.	12 December 1994	Manila, Philippines	Hard	(South Korea) Park In-sook	(South Korea) Choi Ju-yeon (South Korea) Kim Eun-ha	3–6, 4–6
Runner-up	4.	19 December 1994	Manila, Philippines	Hard	(South Korea) Park In-sook	(China) Chen Li-Ling (China) Yi Jing-Qian	2–6, 5–7
Runner-up	5.	8 May 1995	Seoul, South Korea	Clay	(Japan) Mami Donoshiro	(South Korea) Kim Eun-ha (South Korea) Choi Ju-yeon	3–6, 3–6
Winner	2.	18 March 1996	Bandar Seri Begawan, Brunei	Hard	(Japan) Nao Akahori	(South Korea) Choi Young-ja (South Korea) Im Kum-ok	7–5, 6–1
Runner-up	6.	1 April 1996	Jakarta, Indonesia	Hard	(Japan) Nao Akahori	(Japan) Kiyoko Yazawa (Japan) Mami Donoshiro	2–6, 7–6^{(4)}, 4–6
Winner	3.	27 May 1996	Taipei, Taiwan	Hard	(Japan) Miyako Ataka	(Chinese Taipei) Julie Huang (Thailand) Benjamas Sangaram	7–6^{(2)}, 6–3
Runner-up	7.	30 September 1996	Ibaraki, Japan	Hard	(Japan) Kiyoko Yazawa	(Japan) Keiko Nagatomi (Japan) Yuka Tanaka	6–3, 3–6, 5–7
Winner	4.	28 July 1997	Bandung, Indonesia	Hard	(Thailand) Benjamas Sangaram	(Japan) Tomoe Hotta (Japan) Yoriko Yamagishi	6–2, 3–6, 6–4
Runner-up	8.	13 October 1997	Haibara, Japan	Grass	(South Korea) Won Kyung-joo	(Japan) Nao Akahori (Japan) Ryoko Takemura	6–3, 4–6, 4–6
Winner	5.	3 November 1997	Beijing, China	Hard	(Japan) Keiko Nagatomi	(China) Chen Jingjing (China) Yi Jing-Qian	7–6^{(4)}, 1–6, 6–3
Winner	6.	16 March 1998	Noda, Japan	Hard	(Japan) Keiko Nagatomi	(Japan) Kyōko Nagatsuka (Japan) Saori Obata	3–6, 6–2, 6–3
Winner	7.	18 May 1998	Spartanburg, United States	Clay	(Japan) Keiko Nagatomi	(Canada) Renata Kolbovic (South Africa) Jessica Steck	6–3, 7–5
Winner	8.	25 May 1998	El Paso, United States	Hard	(Japan) Keiko Nagatomi	(United States) Kaysie Smashey (United States) Sara Walker	6–2, 6–3
Winner	9.	1 June 1998	Little Rock, United States	Hard	(Japan) Keiko Nagatomi	(China) Li Li (China) Li Ting	7–5, 6–1
Winner	10.	16 November 1998	Haibara Japan	Clay	(Japan) Tomoko Ishida	(Japan) Maiko Inoue (Japan) Yasuko Nishimata	5–7, 7–6^{(7)}, 6–3
Winner	11.	23 November 1998	Nagasaki, Japan	Grass	(Japan) Akiko Gunji	(Japan) Seiko Okamoto (Japan) Keiko Taguchi	6–2, 6–2
Winner	12.	27 September 1999	Kyoto, Japan	Carpet	(Japan) Nami Urabe	(Japan) Yuki Fujii (Japan) Yumiko Kitamura	6–1, 6–3
Runner-up	9.	13 November 2000	Haibara, Japan	Clay	(Japan) Akiko Gunji	(Japan) Seiko Okamoto (Japan) Keiko Taguchi	4–2, 0–4, 3–5, 5–3, 2–4
Winner	13.	18 November 2001	Haibara, Japan	Carpet	(Japan) Tomoko Taira	(Japan) Kumiko Iijima (Japan) Satoko Kurioka	6–2, 6–4
