= Mari Tanaka =

Japanese tennis player (born 1987)

Mari Tanaka 田中 真梨
- Country (sports): Japan
- Residence: Tokyo
- Born: 11 January 1987 (age 39) Tokyo
- Plays: Right (two-handed backhand)
- Prize money: $122,968

Singles
- Career record: 228–204
- Career titles: 4 ITF
- Highest ranking: No. 287 (12 August 2013)

Doubles
- Career record: 183–121
- Career titles: 18 ITF
- Highest ranking: No. 189 (12 May 2014)

Mari Tanaka (田中 真梨, Tanaka Mari; born January 11, 1987) is a Japanese former professional tennis player.

== Career ==
In her career, she won four singles titles and 18 doubles titles on the ITF Women's Circuit. In August 2013, she achieved a career-high singles ranking of world No. 287. On 12 May 2014, she peaked at No. 189 in the doubles rankings by the Women's Tennis Association (WTA).

== ITF finals ==
Legend
$50,000 tournaments
$25,000 tournaments
$10,000 tournaments

=== Singles: 10 (4 titles, 6 runner-ups) ===
Result	No.	Date	Tournament	Surface	Opponent	Score
Win	1.	24 May 2005	ITF León, Mexico	Hard (i)	(Argentina) Micaela Moran	6–4, 6–1
Loss	1.	6 June 2005	ITF Tokyo, Japan	Hard	(Japan) Kanae Hisami	3–6, 3–6
Loss	2.	29 August 2005	ITF Saitama, Japan	Hard	(Australia) Beti Sekulovski	6–3, 4–6, 3–6
Loss	3.	19 August 2007	ITF Tokyo, Japan	Hard	(Hong Kong) Zhang Ling	6–4, 5–7, 2–6
Loss	4.	28 August 2007	ITF Saitama, Japan	Hard	(China) Zhao Yijing	4–6, 3–6
Loss	5.	11 July 2010	ITF Tokyo, Japan	Carpet	(Japan) Kaori Onishi	6–4, 4–6, 1–6
Win	2.	29 January 2011	ITF Kolkata, India	Clay	(Slovenia) Dalila Jakupović	6–4, 6–3
Loss	6.	17 June 2012	ITF Tokyo, Japan	Hard	(Japan) Nao Hibino	0–6, 2–6
Win	3.	19 August 2012	ITF Istanbul, Turkey	Hard	(Japan) Yuuki Tanaka	6–0, 6–2
Win	4.	9 August 2014	ITF Nottingham, United Kingdom	Hard	(Japan) Mai Minokoshi	6–3, 6–4

=== Doubles: 33 (18–15) ===
Outcome	No.	Date	Tournament	Surface	Partner	Opponents	Score
Runner-up	1.	24 May 2005	ITF León, Mexico	Hard (i)	(United States) Elizabeth Kaufman	(Argentina) Andrea Benítez (Mexico) Daniela Múñoz Gallegos	4–6, 6–1, 1–6
Winner	1.	29 August 2005	ITF Saitama, Japan	Hard	(United States) Elizabeth Kaufman	(South Korea) Kim Hea-mi (Japan) Eriko Mizuno	6–4, 6–3
Runner-up	2.	29 September 2006	ITF Tokyo, Japan	Hard	(Japan) Yurika Sema	(Latvia) Līga Dekmeijere (Japan) Ayami Takase	6–7^{(3)}, 3–6
Runner-up	3.	31 October 2006	ITF Sutama, Japan	Clay	(Japan) Ryoko Takemura	(Japan) Maki Arai (Japan) Seiko Okamoto	2–6, 3–6
Winner	2.	27 February 2007	ITF Wellington, New Zealand	Hard	(China) Song Shanshan	(Japan) Tomoko Dokei (Japan) Etsuko Kitazaki	6–2, 6–0
Winner	3.	6 March 2007	ITF Hamilton, New Zealand	Hard	(South Korea) Lee Ye-ra	(Australia) Emelyn Starr (Australia) Jenny Swift	6–2, 6–4
Runner-up	4.	27 May 2007	ITF Nagano, Japan	Carpet	(Japan) Akiko Yonemura	(Japan) Natsumi Hamamura (Japan) Ayaka Maekawa	6–7^{(2)}, 3–6
Winner	4.	9 June 2007	ITF Tokyo, Japan	Hard	(Japan) Ayumi Oka	(Japan) Etsuko Kitazaki (Japan) Tomoko Taira	3–6, 6–1, 6–4
Runner-up	5.	30 June 2007	ITF Noto, Japan	Carpet	(Japan) Natsumi Hamamura	(Australia) Sophie Ferguson (United States) Anne Yelsey	6–7^{(8)}, 1–6
Winner	5.	4 August 2008	ITF Obihiro, Japan	Hard	(Japan) Shiho Hisamatsu	(Japan) Miki Miyamura (Japan) Tomoyo Takagishi	6–4, 6–2
Winner	6.	30 May 2009	ITF Gunma, Japan	Carpet	(Chinese Taipei) Hsu Wen-hsin	(Japan) Erika Sema (Japan) Yurika Sema	6–3, 1–6, [10–7]
Winner	7.	13 June 2009	ITF Tokyo, Japan	Hard	(Japan) Ayumi Oka	(Japan) Maki Arai (Japan) Yurina Koshino	7–6^{(6)}, 6–0
Winner	8.	11 July 2009	ITF Tokyo, Japan	Hard	(Japan) Maki Arai	(Japan) Kazusa Ito (Japan) Tomoko Taira	7–5, 3–6, [13–11]
Winner	9.	29 August 2009	ITF Saitama, Japan	Hard	(Japan) Maki Arai	(Japan) Airi Hagimoto (Japan) Maiko Inoue	6–2, 6–4
Runner-up	6.	4 September 2009	ITF Tsukuba, Japan	Hard	(Chinese Taipei) Hsu Wen-hsin	(Bolivia) María Fernanda Álvarez Terán (United Kingdom) Jade Curtis	6–1, 2–6, [2–10]
Runner-up	7.	26 September 2009	ITF Miyazaki, Japan	Carpet	(Japan) Tomoko Yonemura	(Japan) Kurumi Nara (Japan) Erika Sema	0–6, 0–6
Runner-up	8.	8 May 2010	ITF Tarakan, Indonesia	Hard	(China) Liu Wanting	(Indonesia) Ayu-Fani Damayanti (Indonesia) Lavinia Tananta	4–6, 5–7
Runner-up	9.	21 January 2011	ITF Muzaffarnagar, India	Grass	(Japan) Miki Miyamura	(India) Rushmi Chakravarthi (India) Poojashree Venkatesha	6–3, 4–6, 4–6
Runner-up	10.	1 April 2011	ITF Ipswich, Australia	Clay	(Japan) Miki Miyamura	(Australia) Casey Dellacqua (Australia) Olivia Rogowska	4–6, 4–6
Winner	10.	20 August 2011	ITF Taipei, Taiwan	Hard	(Japan) Miyabi Inoue	(South Korea) Chae Kyung-yee (South Korea) Kim Hae-sung	7–5, 2–6, [10–7]
Winner	11.	6 July 2012	ITF Pattaya, Thailand	Hard	(Japan) Eri Hozumi	(Australia) Tyra Calderwood (New Zealand) Dianne Hollands	4–6, 6–4, [12–10]
Winner	12.	21 July 2012	ITF Istanbul, Turkey	Hard	(Japan) Yurina Koshino	(Japan) Akari Inoue (Japan) Kaori Onishi	7–5, 6–7^{(2)}, [10–8]
Runner-up	11.	1 September 2012	ITF Tsukuba, Japan	Hard	(Japan) Yurina Koshino	(Thailand) Luksika Kumkhum (Thailand) Varatchaya Wongteanchai	2–6, 2–6
Runner-up	12.	8 September 2012	ITF Noto, Japan	Grass	(Japan) Miki Miyamura	(Japan) Kumiko Iijima (Japan) Akiko Yonemura	1–6, 6–4, [5–10]
Winner	13.	3 March 2013	ITF Sydney, Australia	Hard	(Japan) Misa Eguchi	(Serbia) Tamara Čurović (China) Wang Yafan	4–6, 7–5, [10–8]
Winner	14.	19 May 2013	Kurume Cup, Japan	Grass	(Japan) Kanae Hisami	(Japan) Rika Fujiwara (Japan) Akiko Omae	6–4, 7–6^{(2)}
Runner-up	13.	20 July 2013	ITF Woking, UK	Hard	(Japan) Kanae Hisami	(United Kingdom) Tara Moore (Russia) Marta Sirotkina	6–4, 1–6, [7–10]
Winner	15.	26 July 2013	ITF Wrexham, UK	Hard	(Japan) Kanae Hisami	(United Kingdom) Anna Smith (United Kingdom) Melanie South	6–3, 7–6^{(2)}
Winner	16.	14 June 2014	Fergana Challenger, Uzbekistan	Hard	(Japan) Hiroko Kuwata	(Japan) Nao Hibino (India) Prarthana Thombare	6–1, 6–4
Winner	17.	8 August 2014	ITF Nottingham, UK	Hard	(Australia) Alison Bai	(United Kingdom) Katie Boulter (United Kingdom) Freya Christie	6–4, 6–3
Winner	18.	16 August 2014	ITF Woking, UK	Hard	(Japan) Yumi Miyazaki	(Italy) Alice Matteucci (Greece) Despina Papamichail	6–2, 7–5
Runner-up	14.	18 October 2014	ITF Makinohara, Japan	Grass	(Japan) Makoto Ninomiya	(Germany) Tatjana Maria (Japan) Miki Miyamura	3–6, 1–6
Runner-up	15.	25 October 2014	ITF Hamamatsu, Japan	Carpet	(Japan) Makoto Ninomiya	(Germany) Tatjana Maria (Japan) Miki Miyamura	7–5, 2–6, [5–10]
