= Ryoko Takemura =

Japanese tennis player (born 1976)

- Country (sports): Japan
- Born: 2 June 1976 (age 50)
- Prize money: $76,054

Singles
- Career record: 139–148
- Career titles: 3 ITF
- Highest ranking: No. 325 (21 June 2004)

Doubles
- Career record: 141–115
- Career titles: 9 ITF
- Highest ranking: No. 165 (3 October 2005)

Grand Slam doubles results
- Australian Open: 1R (2004)
Medal record
Representing Japan
Summer Universiade
Bronze medal – third place	1999 Palma de Mallorca	Women's doubles

Ryoko Takemura (born 2 June 1976) is a Japanese former professional tennis player. She competed predominantly on the ITF Women's Circuit, winning three singles and nine doubles titles.

In 1999 she won a Universiade bronze medal for Japan in the women's doubles with Seiko Okamoto.

At the 2004 Australian Open, Takemura and Seiko Okamoto were given a wildcard into the doubles main draw, where they were beaten in the opening round by second seeds Martina Navratilova and Lisa Raymond.

In 2005, she teamed up with Tomoko Yonemura to win three $25k tournaments, and reached her best doubles ranking of 165 in the world.

== ITF finals ==
Legend
$50,000 tournaments
$25,000 tournaments
$10,000 tournaments

=== Singles: 6 (3–3) ===
Outcome	No.	Date	Location	Surface	Opponent	Score
Winner	1.	28 September 1997	ITF Tokyo, Japan	Hard	(Australia) Amanda Grahame	6–3, 5–7, 6–4
Winner	2.	13 October 1997	ITF Haibara, Japan	Grass	(Japan) Keiko Ishida	3–6, 6–4, 6–4
Runner-up	1.	16 August 1998	ITF Alghero, Italy	Hard	(Italy) Laura Dell'Angelo	2–6, 5–7
Runner-up	2.	14 April 2003	ITF Yamaguchi, Japan	Clay	(Croatia) Sanda Mamić	2–6, 2–6
Runner-up	3.	31 August 2003	ITF Saitama, Japan	Hard	(Chinese Taipei) Hsieh Su-wei	3–6, 2–6
Winner	3.	7 September 2003	ITF Ibaraki, Japan	Hard	(Japan) Tomoyo Takagishi	6–4, 6–3

=== Doubles: 19 (9–10) ===
Outcome	No.	Date	Tournament	Surface	Partner	Opponents	Score
Winner	1.	13 October 1997	ITF Haibara, Japan	Grass	(Japan) Nao Akahori	(Japan) Keiko Ishida (South Korea) Won Kyung-joo	3–6, 6–4, 6–4
Winner	2.	24 August 1998	Milan, Italy	Grass	(Japan) Hiroko Mochizuki	(Croatia) Marijana Kovačević (Italy) Giulia Casoni	4–6, 7–6^{(5)}, 6–4
Runner-up	1.	6 September 1998	Spoleto, Italy	Clay	(Japan) Hiroko Mochizuki	(Croatia) Jelena Kostanić Tošić (Czech Republic) Michaela Paštiková	3–6, 4–6
Runner-up	2.	6 March 2000	Haikou, China	Hard	(South Korea) Chae Kyung-yee	(Hungary) Gréta Arn (United Kingdom) Julie Pullin	5–7, 4–6
Runner-up	3.	26 March 2000	Nanjing, China	Hard	(South Korea) Chae Kyung-yee	(China) Li Na (China) Li Ting	6–7^{(4)}, 1–6
Winner	3.	17 July 2000	Baltimore, United States	Hard	(Japan) Tomoe Hotta	(United States) Courtenay Chapman (Chinese Taipei) Weng Tzu-ting	6–3, 6–2
Winner	4.	24 July 2000	Evansville, United States	Hard	(Japan) Tomoe Hotta	(Japan) Rika Fujiwara (United States) Anne Plessinger	6–4, 6–1
Runner-up	4.	8 July 2001	Los Gatos, United States	Hard	(Japan) Yuka Yoshida	(United States) Dawn Buth (Canada) Vanessa Webb	2–6, 6–7
Runner-up	5.	7 July 2002	Los Gatos, United States	Hard	(Japan) Yuka Yoshida	(United States) Teryn Ashley (Canada) Vanessa Webb	3–6, 4–6
Runner-up	6.	10 March 2003	Benalla, Australia	Grass	(India) Rushmi Chakravarthi	(Australia) Nicole Sewell (Netherlands) Andrea van den Hurk	3–6, 6–4, 2–6
Runner-up	7.	10 August 2003	Nonthaburi, Thailand	Hard	(South Korea) Kim Jin-hee	(Chinese Taipei) Chan Chin-wei (Chinese Taipei) Chuang Chia-jung	2–6, 5–7
Winner	5.	25 August 2003	Saitama, Japan	Hard	(South Korea) Chang Kyung-mi	(Chinese Taipei) Hsieh Su-wei (Japan) Mari Inoue	6–2, 6–2
Runner-up	8.	1 September 2003	Saitama, Japan	Hard	(South Korea) Chang Kyung-mi	(Japan) Shizu Katsumi (Japan) Keiko Taguchi	6–1, 6–7^{(3)}, 2–6
Winner	6.	15 September 2003	Kyoto, Japan	Carpet (i)	(South Korea) Chang Kyung-mi	(Chinese Taipei) Hsieh Su-wei (Japan) Mari Inoue	7–5, 7–5
Winner	7.	29 May 2005	Nagano, Japan	Carpet	(Japan) Tomoko Yonemura	(South Korea) Kim Hea-mi (Japan) Keiko Taguchi	6–1, 7–6^{(5)}
Winner	8.	24 September 2005	Ibaraki, Japan	Hard	(Japan) Tomoko Yonemura	(South Korea) Jeon Mi-ra (Japan) Ayami Takase	6–2, 6–4
Winner	9.	23 October 2005	Makinohara, Japan	Carpet	(Japan) Tomoko Yonemura	(Japan) Seiko Okamoto (Japan) Ayami Takase	6–4, 6–3
Runner-up	9.	4 June 2006	Gunma, Japan	Carpet	(Japan) Akiko Yonemura	(Australia) Christina Horiatopoulos (Australia) Trudi Musgrave	1–6, 7–5, 2–6
Runner-up	10.	31 October 2006	ITF Sutama, Japan	Clay	(Japan) Mari Tanaka	(Japan) Maki Arai (Japan) Seiko Okamoto	2–6, 3–6
