= Maki Arai =

Japanese tennis player (born 1982)

- Country (sports): Japan
- Born: 23 December 1982 (age 43) Tachikawa Japan
- Turned pro: 2000
- Retired: 2010
- Plays: Right-handed (two-handed backhand)
- Prize money: $63,372

Singles
- Career record: 124–174
- Career titles: 0
- Highest ranking: No. 425 (14 June 2004)

Doubles
- Career record: 249–125
- Career titles: 27 ITF
- Highest ranking: No. 185 (12 September 2005)

Maki Arai (新井 麻葵, Arai Maki; born 23 December 1982) is a former professional Japanese tennis player.

Her career-high singles rank is No. 425, which she reached in June 2004. Her high doubles ranking is world No. 185, which she achieved in September 2005. Arai retired from professional tour 2010.

== ITF Circuit finals ==
Legend
$100,000 tournaments
$75,000 tournaments
$50,000 tournaments
$25,000 tournaments
$10,000 tournaments

=== Singles: 3 (0–3) ===
Result	No.	Date	Tournament	Surface	Opponent	Score
Loss	1.	6 May 2001	ITF Hatfield, United Kingdom	Clay	(France) Marion Bartoli	0–6, 2–6
Loss	2.	26 October 2003	ITF Tokyo, Japan	Hard	(Japan) Ryōko Fuda	7–5, 3–6, 2–6
Loss	3.	22 June 2008	ITF Sutama, Japan	Clay	(Japan) Miki Miyamura	3–6, 3–6

=== Doubles: 47 (27–20) ===
Result	No.	Date	Tournament	Surface	Partner	Opponents	Score
Loss	1.	26 September 1999	ITF Tokyo, Japan	Hard	(Japan) Kumiko Iijima	(China) Li Na (China) Li Ting	2–6, 1–6
Win	2.	21 November 1999	ITF Haibara, Japan	Carpet	(Japan) Kumiko Iijima	(South Korea) Choi Young-ja (South Korea) Kim Eun-sook	6–2, 6–0
Loss	3.	28 November 1999	ITF Kofu, Japan	Carpet	(Japan) Remi Tezuka	(Japan) Seiko Okamoto (Japan) Keiko Taguchi	6–7, 6–0, 5–7
Loss	4.	20 November 2000	Kofu Open, Japan	Carpet	(Japan) Kumiko Iijima	(Japan) Seiko Okamoto (Japan) Keiko Taguchi	5–3, 1–4, 4–5, 1–4
Win	5.	29 April 2001	ITF Bournemouth, England	Clay	(United Kingdom) Julia Smith	(Austria) Daniela Klemenschits (Austria) Sandra Klemenschits	6–7^{(4)}, 6–3, 6–3
Win	6.	24 June 2001	ITF Montréal, Canada	Hard	(Japan) Kaori Aoyama	(Japan) Ayano Takeuchi (Japan) Tomoko Yonemura	6–1, 6–3
Win	7.	8 July 2001	ITF Kaohsiung, Taiwan	Hard	(Japan) Kumiko Iijima	(Malaysia) Khoo Chin-bee (Chinese Taipei) Weng Tzu-ting	w/o
Win	8.	10 February 2002	ITF Faro, Portugal	Hard	(Japan) Remi Tezuka	(Japan) Satomi Kinjo (Japan) Seiko Okamoto	7–5, 6–7^{(5)}, 6–2
Win	9.	17 February 2002	ITF Vilamoura, Portugal	Hard	(Japan) Remi Tezuka	(Romania) Liana Ungur (Spain) Marta Fraga	6–2, 7–5
Win	10.	21 July 2002	ITF Seoul, South Korea	Hard	(Japan) Seiko Okamoto	(South Korea) Chae Kyung-yee (South Korea) Chang Kyung-mi	6–3, 5–7, 6–4
Win	11.	1 September 2002	ITF Ibaraki, Japan	Hard	(Japan) Kaori Aoyama	(Japan) Yumiko Kitamura (Japan) Keiko Taguchi	4–6, 6–1, 6–2
Loss	12.	15 September 2002	ITF Kyoto, Japan	Hard (i)	(Japan) Kaori Aoyama	(Japan) Shiho Hisamatsu (Japan) Maiko Inoue	5–7, 5–7
Loss	13.	23 February 2003	ITF Bangalore, India	Hard	(Belarus) Natallia Dziamidzenka	(India) Rushmi Chakravarthi (India) Sai Jayalakshmy Jayaram	6–7^{(5)}, 6–7^{(4)}
Loss	14.	20 April 2003	ITF Yamaguchi, Japan	Clay	(Japan) Ryoko Fuda	(Japan) Akiko Kinebuchi (Japan) Tomoko Taira	6–3, 6–7^{(7)}, 4–6
Loss	15.	18 May 2003	ITF Nagano, Japan	Grass	(Japan) Aiko Nakamura	(Japan) Tomoko Taira (Japan) Tomoko Yonemura	3–6, 1–6
Loss	16.	25 May 2003	ITF Gunma, Japan	Grass	(Japan) Aiko Nakamura	(Japan) Kumiko Iijima (Thailand) Suchanun Viratprasert	6–4, 5–7, 4–6
Win	17.	21 June 2003	ITF Incheon, South Korea	Hard	(Chinese Taipei) Wang I-ting	(South Korea) Kim Ye-on (South Korea) Lee Joo-hee	6–1, 1–6, 6–2
Win	18.	26 October 2003	ITF Tokyo, Japan	Hard	(Japan) Ryoko Fuda	(Japan) Shizu Katsumi (South Korea) Kim Hea-mi	6–2, 6–3
Loss	19.	3 July 2004	ITF Incheon, South Korea	Hard	(Japan) Remi Tezuka	(South Korea) Lee Jin-a (South Korea) Yoo Soo-mi	2–6, 6–4, 4–6
Win	20.	7 September 2004	ITF Ibaraki, Japan	Hard	(Japan) Remi Tezuka	(Japan) Rika Fujiwara (Japan) Shiho Hisamatsu	6–1, 5–7, 6–2
Loss	21.	19 September 2004	ITF Kyoto, Japan	Carpet	(Japan) Satomi Kinjo	(Australia) Natasha Kersten (Japan) Eriko Mizuno	4–6, 6–4, 4–6
Loss	22.	31 October 2004	ITF Tokyo, Japan	Hard	(Japan) Akiko Yonemura	(Japan) Kumiko Iijima (Japan) Junri Namigata	3–6, 1–6
Win	23.	5 February 2005	ITF Wellington, New Zealand	Hard	(South Korea) Chang Kyung-mi	(Australia) Beti Sekulovski (Sweden) Aleksandra Srndovic	3–6, 6–4, 6–4
Win	24.	13 February 2005	ITF Blenheim, New Zealand	Hard	(South Korea) Chang Kyung-mi	(Australia) Beti Sekulovski (Sweden) Aleksandra Srndovic	6–4, 7–6
Win	25.	13 February 2005	ITF Yamaguchi, Japan	Clay	(Japan) Kumiko Iijima	(Australia) Lisa D'Amelio (Australia) Christina Horiatopoulos	6–3, 7–6
Loss	26.	11 June 2005	ITF Seoul, South Korea	Hard	(South Korea) Lee Eun-jeong	(Chinese Taipei) Chan Chin-wei (Chinese Taipei) Hsieh Su-wei	2–6, 1–6
Win	27.	11 September 2005	ITF Beijing, China	Hard	(South Korea) Kim So-jung	(Chinese Taipei) Chan Yung-jan (Chinese Taipei) Hwang I-hsuan	6–4, 6–0
Win	28.	30 October 2005	ITF Tokyo, Japan	Hard	(South Korea) Kim Hea-mi	(Australia) Lauren Breadmore (Germany) Annette Kolb	6–4, 7–6
Win	29.	6 November 2005	ITF Sutama, Japan	Clay	(Japan) Kumiko Iijima	(Japan) Tomoko Dokei (Japan) Yukiko Yabe	6–1, 6–2
Win	30.	16 July 2006	ITF Miyazaki, Japan	Carpet	(Japan) Kumiko Iijima	(Japan) Seiko Okamoto (Japan) Ayami Takase	6–2, 6–3
Loss	31.	10 September 2006	ITF Kyoto, Japan	Carpet	(Japan) Yukiko Yabe	(Japan) Natsumi Hamamura (Japan) Ayaka Maekawa	4–6, 2–6
Loss	32.	17 September 2006	ITF Hiroshima, Japan	Carpet	(Thailand) Montinee Tangphong	(Japan) Yuka Kuroda (Japan) Eriko Mizuno	1–6, 4–6
Loss	33.	28 October 2006	ITF Hamanako, Japan	Carpet	(Japan) Seiko Okamoto	(Chinese Taipei) Chuang Chia-jung (Chinese Taipei) Hsieh Su-wei	6–7^{(2)}, 5–7
Win	34.	5 November 2006	ITF Sutama, Japan	Clay	(Japan) Seiko Okamoto	(Japan) Ryoko Takemura (Japan) Mari Tanaka	6–2, 6–3
Win	35.	4 November 2007	ITF Kofu, Japan	Hard	(South Korea) Chang Kyung-mi	(Japan) Ayaka Maekawa (Thailand) Varatchaya Wongteanchai	5–7, 6–2, [10–7]
Win	36.	8 March 2008	ITF Hamilton, New Zealand	Hard	(Japan) Yurina Koshino	(Australia) Alison Bai (Australia) Emelyn Starr	7–6^{(3)}, 7–6^{(2)}
Loss	37.	6 September 2008	ITF Tsukuba, Japan	Hard	(Japan) Yurika Sema	(Chinese Taipei) Chan Chin-wei (Chinese Taipei) Hwang I-hsuan	0–6, 4–6
Loss	38.	20 September 2008	ITF Kyoto, Japan	Carpet	(Japan) Yurina Koshino	(Japan) Ayumi Oka (Thailand) Varatchaya Wongteanchai	7–5, 2–6, [2–10]
Loss	39.	27 March 2009	ITF Kofu, Japan	Hard	(Japan) Miki Miyamura	(Japan) Shuko Aoyama (Japan) Akari Inoue	5–7, 6–3, [8–10]
Win	40.	1 May 2009	ITF Bundaberg, Australia	Clay	(Switzerland) Nicole Riner	(Australia) Isabella Holland (Australia) Sally Peers	1–6, 6–4, 11–9
Win	41.	1 May 2009	ITF Ipswich, Australia	Clay	(Australia) Olivia Rogowska	(Australia) Tyra Calderwood (Australia) Shannon Golds	6–3, 6–2
Loss	42.	14 June 2009	ITF Tokyo, Japan	Hard	(Japan) Yurina Koshino	(Japan) Ayumi Oka (Japan) Mari Tanaka	6–7^{(6)}, 0–6
Win	43.	11 July 2009	ITF Tokyo, Japan	Carpet	(Japan) Mari Tanaka	(Japan) Kazusa Ito (Japan) Tomoko Taira	7–5, 3–6, [13–11]
Loss	44.	8 August 2009	ITF Niigata, Japan	Carpet	(Japan) Etsuko Kitazaki	(Japan) Airi Hagimoto (Japan) Maiko Inoue	2–6, 2–6
Win	45.	29 August 2009	ITF Saitama, Japan	Hard	(Japan) Mari Tanaka	(Japan) Airi Hagimoto (Japan) Maiko Inoue	6–2, 6–4
Win	46.	26 March 2010	ITF Kofu, Japan	Hard	(Japan) Seiko Okamoto	(Japan) Shiho Hisamatsu (Japan) Maiko Inoue	6–4, 6–4
Win	47.	11 July 2010	ITF Tokyo, Japan	Carpet	(Japan) Maiko Inoue	(Japan) Airi Hagimoto (Japan) Kaori Onishi	6–2, 7–5
