= Ayaka Maekawa =

Japanese tennis player (born 1983)

- Country (sports): Japan
- Born: 23 August 1983 (age 42)
- Prize money: $61,791

Singles
- Career record: 134–120
- Career titles: 3 ITF
- Highest ranking: No. 315 (31 August 2009)

Doubles
- Career record: 125–88
- Career titles: 8 ITF
- Highest ranking: No. 210 (22 November 2010)

Ayaka Maekawa (前川 綾香, Maekawa Ayaka; born 23 August 1983) is a Japanese former professional tennis player.

Maekawa reached a best singles ranking of 315 and won three titles on the ITF Circuit. As a doubles player, she won eight ITF titles and featured in WTA Tour main draws, with her best performance a quarterfinal appearance at the 2010 Japan Open in Osaka.

== ITF Circuit finals ==
Legend
$50,000 tournaments
$25,000 tournaments
$10,000 tournaments

=== Singles (3–0) ===
Result	No.	Date	Tournament	Surface	Opponent	Score
Win	1.	29 October 2007	ITF Kōfu, Japan	Hard	(Japan) Mayumi Yamamoto	6–4, 7–6^{(6)}
Win	2.	1 September 2008	ITF Goyang, South Korea	Hard	(South Korea) Kim Jooh-young	6–4, 6–3
Win	3.	20 September 2008	ITF Kyoto, Japan	Carpet	(Chinese Taipei) Hsu Wen-hsin	7–5, 6–4

=== Doubles (8–11) ===
Result	No.	Date	Tournament	Surface	Partner	Opponents	Score
Win	1.	10 September 2006	ITF Kyoto, Japan	Carpet	(Japan) Natsumi Hamamura	(Japan) Maki Arai (Japan) Yukiko Yabe	6–4, 6–2
Loss	1.	23 September 2006	ITF Ibaraki, Japan	Hard	(Japan) Natsumi Hamamura	(Japan) Kumiko Iijima (Japan) Junri Namigata	7–6^{(4)}, 3–6, 2–6
Win	2.	27 May 2007	ITF Nagano, Japan	Carpet	(Japan) Natsumi Hamamura	(Japan) Mari Tanaka (Japan) Akiko Yonemura	7–6^{(2)}, 6–3
Loss	2.	10 July 2007	ITF Miyazaki, Japan	Carpet	(Japan) Natsumi Hamamura	(China) Zhang Shuai (China) Zhao Yijing	4–6, 4–6
Loss	3.	22 September 2007	ITF Tsukuba, Japan	Hard	(Japan) Natsumi Hamamura	(Japan) Ayumi Oka (Japan) Tomoko Sugano	2–6, 3–6
Loss	4.	4 November 2007	ITF Kofu, Japan	Hard	(Thailand) Varatchaya Wongteanchai	(Japan) Maki Arai (South Korea) Chang Kyung-mi	7–5, 2–6, [7–10]
Win	3.	28 March 2008	ITF Wellington, New Zealand	Hard	(Thailand) Varatchaya Wongteanchai	(Japan) Tomoko Dokei (Japan) Etsuko Kitazaki	6–1, 6–3
Runner-up	5.	24 May 2008	ITF Nagano, Japan	Carpet	(Chinese Taipei) Hwang I-hsuan	(Japan) Erika Sema (Japan) Yurika Sema	3–6, 6–2, [7–10]
Win	4.	22 June 2008	ITF Sutama, Japan	Clay	(Japan) Ayumi Oka	(Japan) Kazusa Ito (Japan) Tomoko Taira	6–3, 6–4
Win	5.	18 August 2008	ITF Gimhae, South Korea	Hard	(South Korea) Kim So-jung	(South Korea) Cho Jeong-a (South Korea) Kim Ji-young	2–6, 6–3, [10–4]
Loss	6.	1 September 2008	ITF Goyang, South Korea	Hard	(South Korea) Kim So-jung	(South Korea) Chae Kyung-yee (South Korea) Chang Kyung-mi	5–7, 6–3, [5–10]
Win	6.	9 March 2009	ITF North Shore, New Zealand	Hard	(South Korea) Kim So-jung	(Australia) Alison Bai (Australia) Renee Binnie	7–5, 7–6
Win	7.	16 March 2009	ITF Hamilton, New Zealand	Hard	(South Korea) Kim So-jung	(Indonesia) Jessy Rompies (Thailand) Varatchaya Wongteanchai	7–5, 6–3
Win	8.	23 March 2009	ITF Wellington, New Zealand	Hard	(South Korea) Kim So-jung	(South Korea) Chae Kyung-yee (South Korea) Kim Hae-sung	6–4, 6–4
Loss	7.	10 May 2009	Fukuoka International, Japan	Grass	(Japan) Junri Namigata	(Japan) Akiko Yonemura (Japan) Tomoko Yonemura	2–6, 7–6^{(3)}, [3–10]
Loss	8.	17 May 2009	Kurume Cup, Japan	Grass	(Chinese Taipei) Chang Kai-chen	(China) Lu Jingjing (China) Sun Shengnan	3–6, 2–6
Loss	9.	30 May 2010	ITF Kusatsu, Japan	Carpet	(Japan) Maya Kato	(Japan) Kumiko Iijima (Japan) Tomoko Yonemura	7–6^{(5)}, 4–6, [8–10]
Loss	10.	28 September 2010	ITF Hamanako, Japan	Clay	(Chinese Taipei) Kao Shao-yuan	(Japan) Erika Sema (Japan) Kumiko Iijima	2–6, 1–6
Loss	11.	9 July 2010	ITF Fuzhou, China	Hard	(Chinese Taipei) Kao Shao-yuan	(China) Liu Shaozhuo (China) Xu Yifan	6–3, 1–6, [2–10]
