= Nami Urabe =

Japanese tennis player (born 1978)

- Country (sports): Japan
- Born: 29 August 1978 (age 46); Saitama, Japan
- Plays: Right-handed
- Prize money: $30,693

Singles
- Career titles: 0
- Highest ranking: No. 399 (4 May 1998)

Doubles
- Career titles: 8 ITF
- Highest ranking: No. 176 (24 November 1997)

Nami Urabe (born 29 August 1978) is a Japanese former professional tennis player.

Born in Saitama, Urabe was one of Japan's top players in junior tennis, reaching the girls' doubles final of the 1995 Australian Open with partner Saori Obata.

Her best performance on the WTA Tour was a quarterfinal appearance in the doubles draw at the 1995 Japan Women's Open and she won eight doubles titles on the ITF Women's Circuit.

== ITF finals ==
$25,000 tournaments
$10,000 tournaments

=== Doubles: 15 (8–7) ===
Outcome	No.	Date	Tournament	Surface	Partner	Opponents	Score
Runner-up	1.	2 October 1995	Ibaraki, Japan	Hard	(Australia) Trudi Musgrave	(Japan) Yoshiko Sasano (Japan) Keiko Nagatomi	0–6, 6–7^{(5)}
Winner	1.	23 October 1995	Kyoto, Japan	Hard	(Australia) Trudi Musgrave	(Japan) Tomoe Hotta (Japan) Eiko Toba	3–6, 6–2, 6–3
Runner-up	2.	8 January 1996	San Antonio, United States	Hard	(Japan) Saori Obata	(United States) Pam Nelson (Hungary) Nóra Köves	6–2, 4–6, 1–6
Winner	2.	25 March 1996	Bandung, Indonesia	Hard	(Japan) Saori Obata	(China) Chen Jingjing (China) Li Li	6–3, 6–3
Runner-up	3.	30 June 1997	Mont-de-Marsan, France	Hard	(Japan) Saori Obata	(Hungary) Katalin Marosi (Argentina) Veronica Stele	4–6, 3–6
Winner	3.	15 September 1997	Ibaraki 1, Japan	Hard	(South Africa) Surina De Beer	(Japan) Riei Kawamata (Japan) Yoshiko Sasano	6–2, 6–3
Winner	4.	22 September 1997	Ibaraki 2, Japan	Hard	(South Africa) Surina De Beer	(Japan) Shizu Katsumi (Japan) Kyoko Kojima	6–3, 6–3
Winner	5.	5 October 1997	Kyoto, Japan	Carpet	(South Africa) Surina De Beer	(Japan) Yumiko Kitamura (Japan) Natsumi Yuki	6–2, 6–3
Runner-up	4.	10 October 1997	Saga, Japan	Grass	(South Africa) Surina De Beer	(Australia) Danielle Jones (Japan) Saori Obata	3–6, 4–6
Runner-up	5.	23 February 1998	Mumbai, India	Hard	(Japan) Yoriko Yamagishi	(China) Chen Jingjing (China) Yang Qin	6–7^{(5)}, 2–6
Winner	6.	27 September 1999	Kyoto, Japan	Carpet	(Japan) Keiko Ishida	(Japan) Yuki Fujii (Japan) Yumiko Kitamura	6–1, 6–3
Winner	7.	3 September 2001	Kugayama, Japan	Hard	(Japan) Seiko Okamoto	(Australia) Melissa Dowse (Australia) Samantha Stosur	6–4, 2–6, 6–1
Runner-up	6.	26 September 2001	Kyoto, Japan	Hard	(Japan) Seiko Okamoto	(Australia) Melissa Dowse (Australia) Samantha Stosur	3–6, 6–3, 2–6
Runner-up	7.	21 October 2002	Tokyo, Japan	Hard	(Japan) Keiko Taguchi	(Japan) Haruka Inoue (Japan) Maiko Inoue	1–6, 2–6
Winner	8.	23 September 2003	Hiroshima, Japan	Grass	(Japan) Tomoko Taira	(Japan) Satomi Kinjo (Japan) Akiko Yonemura	6–3, 6–3
