= Christina Horiatopoulos =

Australian tennis player

- Country (sports): Australia
- Born: 19 November 1983 (age 42) Sydney, Australia
- Retired: 2008
- Plays: Right (two-handed backhand)
- Prize money: $56,704

Singles
- Career record: 78–102
- Career titles: 0
- Highest ranking: No. 326 (25 November 2002)

Grand Slam singles results
- Australian Open: Q1 (2004, 2006)

Doubles
- Career record: 96–72
- Career titles: 8 ITF
- Highest ranking: No. 126 (26 February 2007)

Grand Slam doubles results
- Australian Open: 2R (2006)

Christina Horiatopoulos (born 19 November 1983) is an Australian former tennis player.

Horiatopoulos reached a career-high doubles ranking of world No. 126 on 26 February 2007 and her highest singles ranking of 326 on 25 November 2002.

Her favourite surface in tennis is grass. She started playing at the age of five. Horiatopoulos retired from professional tennis 2008.

She also is the Director of the Christina Horiatopoulos Professional Tennis Academy.

== ITF Circuit finals ==
=== Singles (0–1) ===
Legend $10,000 tournaments	Finals by surface Hard (0–1)

Result	Date	Tournament	Surface	Opponent	Score
Loss	9 June 2002	ITF Toronto, Canada	Hard	(Canada) Beier Ko	2–6, 2–6

=== Doubles (8–8) ===
Legend $75,000 tournaments $50,000 tournaments $25,000 tournaments $10,000 tournaments	Finals by surface Hard (3–3) Clay (4–2) Grass (0–2) Carpet (1–1)

Result	No.	Date	Tournament	Surface	Partner	Opponents	Score
Win	1.	16 June 2002	ITF Toronto, Canada	Hard	(Australia) Lauren Cheung	(Canada) Diana Srebrovic (Canada) Aleksandra Wozniak	6–3, 6–1
Win	2.	1 July 2002	ITF Amsterdam, Netherlands	Clay	(United States) Amanda Augustus	(Czech Republic) Lenka Šnajdrová (Croatia) Ivana Višić	7–6^{(7–4)}, 6–4
Loss	1.	8 July 2002	ITF Felixstowe, United Kingdom	Grass	(Australia) Sarah Stone	(United States) Amanda Augustus (Australia) Nicole Sewell	6–7^{(5–7)}, 4–6
Loss	2.	28 February 2005	ITF Warrnambool, Australia	Grass	(Australia) Lucia Gonzalez	(South Korea) Kim Hea-mi (Japan) Keiko Taguchi	6–7^{(7–9)}, 5–7
Loss	3.	18 April 2005	ITF Yamaguchi, Japan	Clay	(Australia) Lisa D'Amelio	(Japan) Maki Arai (Japan) Kumiko Iijima	3–6, 6–7^{(6–8)}
Loss	4.	13 November 2005	ITF Port Pirie, Australia	Hard	(Australia) Monique Adamczak	(Germany) Gréta Arn (United States) Sunitha Rao	4–6, 6–3, 2–6
Win	3.	17 March 2006	ITF Canberra, Australia	Clay	(Australia) Monique Adamczak	(New Zealand) Leanne Baker (Australia) Nicole Kriz	7–6^{(7–4)}, 6–1
Win	4.	16 April 2006	ITF Patras, Greece	Hard	(Australia) Jarmila Gajdošová	(Bosnia and Herzegovina) Mervana Jugić-Salkić (Ukraine) Yana Levchenko	6–1, 6–4
Win	5.	23 April 2006	ITF Bol, Croatia	Clay	(Germany) Sarah Raab	(Croatia) Josipa Bek (Croatia) Ani Mijačika	5–7, 7–6^{(7–5)}, 7–5
Loss	5.	30 April 2006	ITF Cavtat, Croatia	Clay	(Belgium) Caroline Maes	(Slovenia) Tina Obrež (Slovenia) Anja Prislan	w/o
Loss	6.	14 May 2006	Fukuoka International, Japan	Carpet	(New Zealand) Leanne Baker	(Chinese Taipei) Chan Yung-jan (Chinese Taipei) Chuang Chia-jung	1–6, 2–6
Win	6.	4 June 2006	ITF Gunma, Japan	Carpet	(Australia) Trudi Musgrave	(Japan) Ryoko Takemura (Japan) Akiko Yonemura	6–1, 5–7, 6–2
Win	7.	10 Jul 2006	ITF Le Touquet, France	Clay	(France) Charlène Vanneste	(Luxembourg) Lynn Blau (France) Constance Sibille	6–0, 6–0
Loss	7.	29 July 2006	ITF Les Contamines, France	Hard	(Belgium) Caroline Maes	(Portugal) Catarina Ferreira (Germany) Laura Siegemund	4–6, 6–2, 5–7
Win	8.	8 October 2006	ITF Traralgon, Australia	Hard	(United States) Raquel Kops-Jones	(Australia) Casey Dellacqua (United States) Sunitha Rao	6–2, 7–6^{(7–5)}
Loss	8.	19 November 2006	ITF Port Pirie, Australia	Hard	(Australia) Nicole Kriz	(South Africa) Natalie Grandin (United States) Raquel Kops-Jones	2–6, 1–6
