= 2003 Toray Pan Pacific Open =

- Date: January 28 – February 2
- Edition: 20th
- Category: Tier I
- Draw: 28S / 16D
- Prize money: $1,300,000
- Surface: Carpet / indoor
- Location: Tokyo, Japan
- Venue: Tokyo Metropolitan Gymnasium

Champions

Singles
- (United States) Lindsay Davenport

Doubles
- (Russia) Elena Bovina / (Australia) Rennae Stubbs
- Pan Pacific Open

The 2003 Toray Pan Pacific Open was a women's tennis tournament played on indoor carpet courts. It was the 20th edition of the Toray Pan Pacific Open, and was part of the Tier I Series of the 2003 WTA Tour. It took place at the Tokyo Metropolitan Gymnasium in Tokyo, Japan, from January 28 through February 2, 2003. Third-seeded Lindsay Davenport won the singles title.

== Finals ==
=== Singles ===
(United States) Lindsay Davenport defeated (United States) Monica Seles, 6–7^{(6–8)}, 6–1, 6–2

- It was Davenport's first singles title of the year and the 38th of her career.

=== Doubles ===
(Russia) Elena Bovina / (Australia) Rennae Stubbs defeated (United States) Lindsay Davenport / (United States) Lisa Raymond, 6–3, 6–4
