= Kumiko Iijima =

Japanese tennis player (born 1982)

- Country (sports): Japan
- Residence: Tokyo, Japan
- Born: 22 October 1982 (age 43) Gunma, Japan
- Height: 1.62 m (5 ft 4 in)
- Turned pro: 1998
- Plays: Right (two-handed both sides)
- Prize money: $191,314

Singles
- Career record: 234–243
- Career titles: 4 ITF
- Highest ranking: No. 182 (9 May 2011)

Grand Slam singles results
- Australian Open: Q1 (2008, 2009, 2011)
- French Open: Q1 (2008, 2011)
- Wimbledon: Q3 (2008)
- US Open: Q1 (2007, 2008, 2011)

Doubles
- Career record: 225–149
- Career titles: 20 ITF
- Highest ranking: No. 151 (9 July 2007)

Kumiko Iijima (飯島 久美子, Iijima Kumiko; born 22 October 1982) is a Japanese former tennis player.

She preferred playing on the ITF Women's Circuit where she won four singles and 20 doubles titles. In May 2011, Iijima reached her highest WTA singles ranking of 182. On 9 July 2007, she peaked at No. 151 in the WTA doubles rankings. She was coached by Kimiyo Hatanaka.

== ITF Circuit finals ==
Legend
$50,000 tournaments
$25,000 tournaments
$10,000 tournaments

=== Singles: 10 (4–6) ===
Outcome	No.	Date	Location	Surface	Opponent	Score
Runner-up	1.	21 November 1999	Haibara, Japan	Carpet	(South Korea) Choi Young-ja	3–6, 4–6
Winner	2.	3 June 2007	Gunma, Japan	Carpet	(Japan) Natsumi Hamamura	3–6, 6–3, 7–6^{(7–3)}
Winner	3.	23 September 2007	Tsukuba, Japan	Hard	(United States) Anne Yelsey	6–4, 6–0
Runner-up	4.	14 October 2007	Beijing, China	Hard	(China) Zhou Yimiao	1–6, 2–6
Runner-up	5.	3 June 2008	Gunma, Japan	Carpet	(Japan) Tomoko Yonemura	0–6, 3–6
Runner-up	6.	14 September 2008	Noto, Japan	Carpet	(Thailand) Suchanun Viratprasert	4–6, 4–6
Winner	7.	25 September 2010	Makinohara, Japan	Carpet	(Japan) Shiho Akita	6–1, 6–2
Winner	8.	3 October 2010	Hamanako, Japan	Carpet	(Japan) Erika Sema	6–7^{(4–7)}, 6–2, 6–4
Runner-up	9.	11 December 2010	Bangalore, India	Hard	(Thailand) Nicha Lertpitaksinchai	4–6, 3–6
Runner-up	10.	1 April 2012	Nishitama, Japan	Hard	(Japan) Akiko Yonemura	1–1 ret.

=== Doubles: 36 (20–16) ===
Result	No.	Date	Tournament	Surface	Partner	Opponents	Score
Loss	1.	26 September 1999	ITF Tokyo, Japan	Hard	(Japan) Maki Arai	(China) Li Na (China) Li Ting	2–6, 1–6
Win	2.	21 November 1999	ITF Haibara, Japan	Carpet	(Japan) Maki Arai	(South Korea) Choi Young-ja (South Korea) Kim Eun-sook	6–2, 6–0
Loss	3.	10 July 2000	ITF Brussels, Belgium	Clay	(Japan) Kaori Aoyama	(Russia) Ekaterina Kozhokina (Belgium) Caroline Maes	1–6, 4–6
Loss	4.	20 November 2000	ITF Kofu, Japan	Carpet	(Japan) Maki Arai	(Japan) Seiko Okamoto (Japan) Keiko Taguchi	5–3, 1–4, 4–5, 1–4
Win	5.	8 July 2001	ITF Kaohsiung, Taiwan	Hard	(Japan) Maki Arai	(Malaysia) Khoo Chin-bee (Chinese Taipei) Weng Tzu-ting	w/o
Loss	6.	18 November 2001	ITF Haibara, Japan	Carpet	(Japan) Satoko Kurioka	(Japan) Keiko Ishida (Japan) Tomoko Taira	2–6, 4–6
Loss	7.	21 April 2002	ITF Gunma, Japan	Carpet	(Japan) Mari Inoue	(Chinese Taipei) Chan Chin-wei (Chinese Taipei) Hsieh Su-wei	0–6, 1–6
Win	8.	25 May 2003	ITF Gunma, Japan	Grass	(Thailand) Suchanun Viratprasert	(Japan) Aiko Nakamura (Japan) Maki Arai	4–6, 7–5, 6–4
Loss	9.	2 May 2004	ITF Jakarta, Indonesia	Hard	(Japan) Mari Inoue	(Indonesia) Septi Mende (Indonesia) Wukirasih Sawondari	2–6, 3–6
Win	10.	31 October 2004	ITF Tokyo, Japan	Hard	(Japan) Junri Namigata	(Japan) Maki Arai (Japan) Akiko Yonemura	6–3, 6–1
Win	11.	13 February 2005	ITF Yamaguchi, Japan	Clay	(Japan) Maki Arai	(Australia) Lisa d'Amelio (Australia) Christina Horiatopoulos	6–3, 7–6
Win	12.	17 July 2005	ITF Hamilton, Canada	Clay	(Japan) Junri Namigata	(United States) Lauren Barnikow (Australia) Lauren Breadmore	6–7^{(4–7)}, 6–2, 6–2
Loss	13.	31 July 2005	Lexington Challenger, US	Hard	(Japan) Junri Namigata	(Puerto Rico) Vilmarie Castellvi (United States) Samantha Reeves	2–6, 1–6
Win	14.	6 November 2005	ITF Sutama, Japan	Clay	(Japan) Maki Arai	(Japan) Tomoko Dokei (Japan) Yukiko Yabe	6–1, 6–2
Win	15.	28 May 2006	ITF Nagano, Japan	Carpet	(Japan) Junri Namigata	(Japan) Remi Tezuka (Japan) Tomoko Yonemura	6–3, 7–6^{(7–3)}
Win	16.	16 July 2006	ITF Miyazaki, Japan	Carpet	(Japan) Maki Arai	(Japan) Seiko Okamoto (Japan) Ayami Takase	6–2, 6–3
Win	17.	6 August 2006	ITF Tokachi, Japan	Carpet	(Japan) Junri Namigata	(Japan) Shiho Hisamatsu (Japan) Remi Tezuka	7–5, 6–4
Win	18.	23 September 2006	ITF Ibaraki, Japan	Hard	(Japan) Junri Namigata	(Japan) Natsumi Hamamura (Japan) Ayaka Maekawa	6–7^{(4–7)}, 6–3, 6–2
Win	19.	22 October 2006	ITF Makinohara, Japan	Carpet	(Chinese Taipei) Hsieh Su-wei	(Japan) Keiko Taguchi (Japan) Kim Hea-mi	6–3, 4–6, 6–0
Loss	20.	9 April 2007	ITF Ho Chi Minh City, Vietnam	Hard	(Japan) Seiko Okamoto	(China) Han Xinyun (China) Hao Jie	2–6, 6–1, 3–6
Loss	21.	6 May 2007	Kangaroo Cup, Japan	Carpet	(Japan) Seiko Okamoto	(Japan) Ayumi Morita (Japan) Ai Sugiyama	1–6, 6–3, 0–6
Win	22.	3 June 2007	ITF Gunma, Japan	Carpet	(Japan) Akiko Yonemura	(Chinese Taipei) Chen Yi (South Korea) Yoo Mi	6–4, 6–4
Loss	23.	8 June 2007	ITF Changsha, China	Hard	(Chinese Taipei) Chan Chin-wei	(China) Huang Lei (China) Xu Yifan	3–6, 4–6
Win	24.	7 July 2007	ITF Obihiro, Japan	Carpet	(Japan) Junri Namigata	(Japan) Ayumi Morita (Japan) Akiko Yonemura	7–6^{(7–3)}, 6–0
Loss	25.	13 September 2007	ITF Tokyo, Japan	Hard	(Japan) Akiko Yonemura	(Japan) Junri Namigata (Japan) Rika Fujiwara	6–3, 6–7^{(4–7)}, [5–10]
Win	26.	30 May 2010	ITF Kusatsu, Japan	Carpet	(Japan) Tomoko Yonemura	(Japan) Maya Kato (Japan) Ayaka Maekawa	6–7^{(5–7)}, 6–4, [10–8]
Loss	27.	29 August 2010	ITF Saitama, Japan	Hard	(Japan) Akiko Yonemura	(Japan) Akari Inoue (Japan) Kotomi Takahata	3–6, 3–6
Win	28.	5 September 2010	ITF Tsukuba, Japan	Hard	(Japan) Akiko Yonemura	(Chinese Taipei) Chan Chin-wei (Chinese Taipei) Chen Yi	4–6, 7–6^{(8–6)}, [10–7]
Win	29.	19 September 2010	ITF Darwin, Australia	Hard	(Japan) Yurika Sema	(Australia) Alenka Hubacek (Australia) Tammi Patterson	6–4, 6–1
Win	30.	28 September 2010	ITF Hamanako, Japan	Clay	(Japan) Erika Sema	(Chinese Taipei) Kao Shao-yuan (Japan) Ayaka Maekawa	6–2, 6–1
Loss	31.	12 December 2010	ITF Bangalore, India	Hard	(Chinese Taipei) Chen Yi	(Thailand) Luksika Kumkhum (Thailand) Nungnadda Wannasuk	6–7, 7–5, [8–10]
Loss	32.	25 February 2011	ITF Mildura, Australia	Grass	(Japan) Rika Fujiwara	(Australia) Casey Dellacqua (Australia) Olivia Rogowska	6–4, 6–7^{(6–8)}, [4–10]
Loss	33.	4 March 2011	ITF Sydney, Australia	Hard	(Japan) Rika Fujiwara	(Australia) Casey Dellacqua (Australia) Olivia Rogowska	6–3, 6–7^{(3–7)} [4–10]
Win	34.	21 May 2012	ITF Karuizawa, Japan	Grass	(Chinese Taipei) Hsieh Shu-ying	(United Kingdom) Samantha Murray (United Kingdom) Emily Webley-Smith	3–6, 7–6, [10–1]
Win	35.	9 September 2012	ITF Noto, Japan	Grass	(Japan) Akiko Yonemura	(Japan) Miki Miyamura (Japan) Mari Tanaka	6–1, 4–6 [10–5]
Loss	36.	23 June 2013	ITF Tokyo, Japan	Hard	(Japan) Akiko Yonemura	(Japan) Makoto Ninomiya (Japan) Yuka Mori	4–6, 3–6
