= Rika Fujiwara =

Japanese tennis player (born 1981)

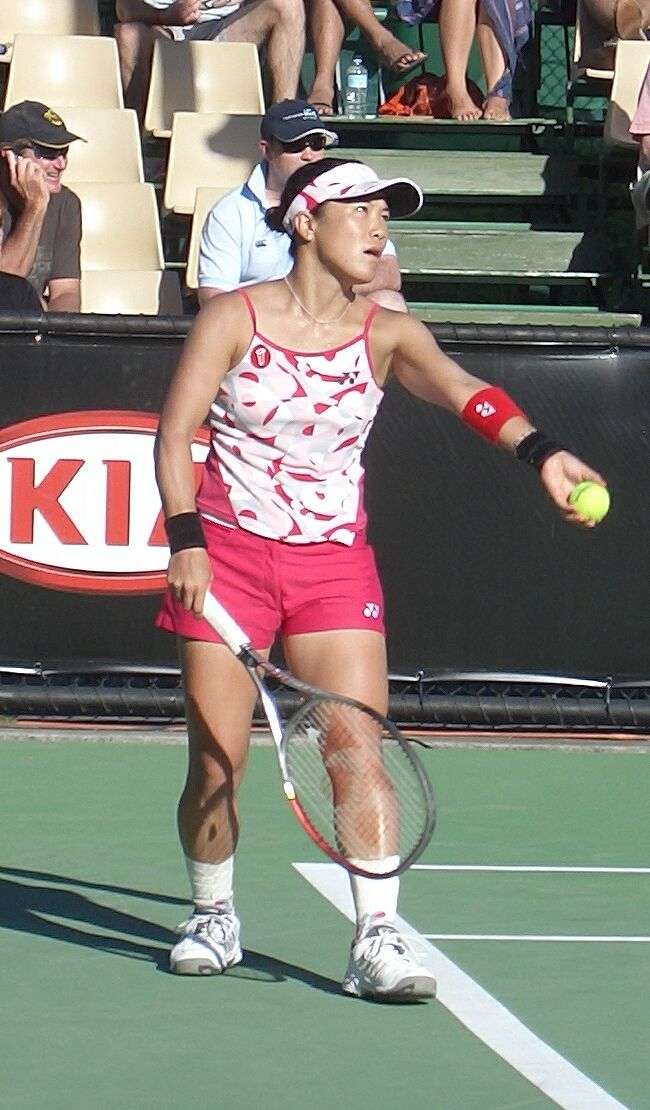
- Fujiwara at the 2006 Australian Open
- Country (sports): Japan
- Born: 19 September 1981 (age 44) Tokyo
- Height: 1.55 m (5 ft 1 in)
- Turned pro: 1999
- Retired: 2020
- Prize money: $882,018

Singles
- Career record: 482–373
- Career titles: 9 ITF
- Highest ranking: No. 84 (22 August 2005)

Grand Slam singles results
- Australian Open: 1R (2006)
- French Open: 1R (2005)
- Wimbledon: 1R (2005, 2008)
- US Open: 1R (2005)

Doubles
- Career record: 394–235
- Career titles: 1 WTA, 36 ITF
- Highest ranking: No. 13 (11 November 2002)

Grand Slam doubles results
- Australian Open: QF (2002)
- French Open: SF (2002)
- Wimbledon: 3R (2002)
- US Open: 3R (2005)

Other doubles tournaments
- Tour Finals: SF (2002)

Grand Slam mixed doubles results
- Australian Open: 1R (2003)
- Wimbledon: 3R (2002)

Team competitions
- Fed Cup: 23–5

Rika Fujiwara (藤原 里華, Fujiwara Rika; born 19 September 1981) is a Japanese former tennis player.

On 22 August 2005, Fujiwara reached her best singles ranking of world No. 84. On 11 November 2002, she peaked at No. 13 in the WTA doubles rankings.

At the 2002 Australian Open, Fujiwara partnered with Shinobu Asagoe and advanced to the quarterfinals, where they lost against eventual champions Martina Hingis and Anna Kournikova. The same year, Fujiwara and Ai Sugiyama reached the French Open doubles semifinals, losing to Lisa Raymond and Rennae Stubbs in three sets.

Playing for Japan Fed Cup team, Fujiwara has a win–loss record of 23–5.

== WTA Tour finals ==
=== Doubles: 6 (1 title, 5 runner-ups) ===
Legend Tier I / Premier M & Premier 5 (0–1) Tier II / Premier (0–1) Tier III, IV & V / International (1–3)	Finals by surface Hard (1–4) Carpet (0–1)

Result	No.	Date	Tournament	Surface	Partner	Opponents	Score
Loss	1.	12 August 2002	Rogers Cup, Canada	Hard	(Japan) Ai Sugiyama	(Spain) Virginia Ruano Pascual (Argentina) Paola Suárez	4–6, 6–7^{(4–7)}
Loss	2.	9 September 2002	China Open, China	Hard	(Japan) Ai Sugiyama	(Russia) Anna Kournikova (Chinese Taipei) Janet Lee	5–7, 3–6
Loss	3.	21 October 2002	Linz Open, Austria	Carpet (i)	(Japan) Ai Sugiyama	(Australia) Jelena Dokić (Russia) Nadia Petrova	3–6, 2–6
Loss	4.	11 October 2010	Japan Women's Open	Hard	(Japan) Shuko Aoyama	(Chinese Taipei) Chang Kai-chen (United States) Lilia Osterloh	0–6, 3–6
Loss	5.	27 February 2012	Malaysian Open, Malaysia	Hard	(Chinese Taipei) Chan Hao-ching	(Chinese Taipei) Chang Kai-chen (Chinese Taipei) Chuang Chia-jung	5–7, 4–6
Win	1.	9 April 2012	Danish Open, Denmark	Hard (i)	(Japan) Kimiko Date-Krumm	(Sweden) Sofia Arvidsson (Estonia) Kaia Kanepi	6–2, 4–6, [10–5]

== ITF Circuit finals ==
$100,000 tournaments
$75/80,000 tournaments
$50,000 tournaments
$25,000 tournaments
$10,000 tournaments

=== Singles (9–8) ===
Result	No.	Date	Tournament	Surface	Opponent	Score
Loss	1.	23 November 1998	ITF Nagasaki, Japan	Grass	(Japan) Maiko Inoue	1–6, 6–3, 6–7^{(3–7)}
Loss	2.	23 July 2000	ITF Baltimore, United States	Hard	(India) Manisha Malhotra	6–7^{(5–7)}, 7–6^{(7–4)}, 2–6
Loss	3.	25 September 2000	ITF Saga, Japan	Grass	(Czech Republic) Eva Krejčová	6–7^{(3–7)}, 2–6
Loss	4.	5 March 2001	ITF Hangzhou, China	Hard	(China) Liu Nannan	6–7^{(2–7)}, 6–3, 5–7
Win	5.	4 June 2001	Surbiton Trophy, UK	Grass	(Puerto Rico) Kristina Brandi	6–3, 6–3
Loss	6.	6 August 2002	ITF Beijing, China	Hard	(China) Sun Tiantian	3–6, 0–6
Win	7.	12 May 2003	ITF Nagano, Japan	Grass	(Japan) Ayami Takase	7–5, 6–0
Win	8.	12 July 2004	ITF Gunma, Japan	Carpet	(Japan) Ayami Takase	6–1, 6–2
Win	9.	12 September 2004	ITF Ibaraki, Japan	Hard	(Japan) Shiho Hisamatsu	4–6, 7–5, 6–0
Win	10.	21 May 2007	ITF Nagano, Japan	Carpet	(Japan) Natsumi Hamamura	7–5, 6–2
Win	11.	21 January 2008	ITF Waikoloa, United States	Hard	(Germany) Sandra Klösel	3–6, 6–3, 6–2
Loss	12.	22 March 2009	ITF Redding, United States	Hard	(United States) Laura Granville	2–6, 6–2, 4–6
Win	13.	16 November 2009	Pune Open, India	Hard	(Serbia) Bojana Jovanovski	5–7, 6–4, 6–3
Loss	14.	6 March 2011	ITF Sydney, Australia	Hard	(Japan) Yurika Sema	4–6, 7–5, 6–7^{(2–7)}
Win	15.	9 May 2011	Kurume Cup, Japan	Grass	(Australia) Monique Adamczak	6–3, 6–1
Loss	16.	16 May 2011	ITF Karuizawa, Japan	Carpet (i)	(Japan) Misa Eguchi	3–6, 3–6
Win	17.	9 December 2013	ITF Navi Mumbai, India	Hard	(Poland) Magda Linette	2–6, 7–6^{(7–5)}, 7–6^{(7–4)}

=== Doubles (36–25) ===
Result	No.	Date	Tournament	Surface	Partner	Opponents	Score
Loss	1.	2 August 1999	ITF Périgueux, France	Clay	(Finland) Hanna-Katri Aalto	(Tunisia) Selima Sfar (United Kingdom) Jo Ward	4–6, 3–6
Loss	2.	24 July 2000	ITF Evansville, United States	Hard	(United States) Anne Plessinger	(Japan) Tomoe Hotta (Japan) Ryoko Takemura	4–6, 1–6
Win	3.	31 July 2000	ITF Harrisonburg, United States	Clay	(Australia) Cindy Watson	(United States) Lauren Kalvaria (United States) Gabriela Lastra	6–4, 5–7, 7–5
Win	4.	26 March 2001	ITF Stone Mountain, United States	Hard	(South Korea) Jeon Mi-ra	(Australia) Alicia Molik (Australia) Bryanne Stewart	7–5, 6–3
Win	5.	13 August 2001	Bronx Open, United States	Hard	(Argentina) Clarisa Fernández	(Netherlands) Kristie Boogert (Belgium) Els Callens	2–6, 7–6^{(7–3)}, 6–4
Win	6.	23 April 2002	Dothan Classic, United States	Clay	(Croatia) Maja Palaveršić	(United States) Samantha Reeves (South Africa) Jessica Steck	6–3, 6–0
Loss	7.	1 May 2002	Kangaroo Cup, Japan	Grass	(Japan) Shinobu Asagoe	(South Korea) Cho Yoon-jeong (Australia) Evie Dominikovic	2–6, 2–6
Win	8.	27 April 2003	Kangaroo Cup, Japan	Grass	(Japan) Saori Obata	(Japan) Shinobu Asagoe (Japan) Nana Smith	1–6, 7–5, 6–3
Loss	9.	6 May 2003	Fukuoka International, Japan	Carpet	(Japan) Saori Obata	(Latvia) Līga Dekmeijere (Japan) Nana Smith	2–6, 6–2, 4–6
Loss	10.	13 July 2003	ITF Modena, Italy	Clay	(Australia) Trudi Musgrave	(China) Li Ting (China) Sun Tiantian	6–3, 5–7, 5–7
Win	11.	18 April 2004	ITF Ho Chi Minh City, Vietnam	Hard	(Japan) Aiko Nakamura	(Ukraine) Olena Antypina (Russia) Goulnara Fattakhetdinova	6–3, 6–3
Win	12.	9 May 2004	Fukuoka International, Japan	Carpet	(Japan) Saori Obata	(Australia) Monique Adamczak (Australia) Nicole Kriz	6–2, 6–4
Win	13.	10 May 2004	ITF Karuizawa, Japan	Carpet	(South Korea) Jeon Mi-ra	(Japan) Ryōko Fuda (Japan) Seiko Okamoto	6–2, 2–6, 7–6^{(7–1)}
Loss	14.	7 September 2004	ITF Ibaraki, Japan	Hard	(Japan) Shiho Hisamatsu	(Japan) Maki Arai (Japan) Remi Tezuka	1–6, 7–5, 2–6
Win	15.	7 November 2004	Shenzhen Open, China	Hard	(Ukraine) Elena Tatarkova	(China) Yan Zi (China) Zheng Jie	6–4, 1–6, 6–1
Loss	16.	14 February 2005	ITF Bromma, Sweden	Hard (i)	(Japan) Ryōko Fuda	(Netherlands) Michelle Gerards (Netherlands) Anousjka van Exel	w/o
Loss	17.	3 April 2005	ITF Augusta, United States	Hard	(Japan) Saori Obata	(Australia) Anastasia Rodionova (Belarus) Tatiana Poutchek	6–7^{(3–7)}, 0–6
Win	18.	8 May 2005	Kangaroo Cup, Japan	Carpet	(Japan) Saori Obata	(Japan) Ryōko Fuda (Japan) Seiko Okamoto	6–1, 6–2
Win	19.	31 May 2005	Surbiton Trophy, UK	Grass	(Japan) Saori Obata	(United States) Jennifer Hopkins (United States) Mashona Washington	4–6, 6–4, 6–2
Loss	20.	13 May 2007	Fukuoka International, Japan	Carpet	(Japan) Junri Namigata	(Japan) Ayumi Morita (Japan) Akiko Yonemura	2–6, 2–6
Win	21.	13 September 2007	ITF Tokyo, Japan	Hard	(Japan) Junri Namigata	(Japan) Kumiko Iijima (Japan) Akiko Yonemura	3–6, 7–6^{(7–4)}, [10–5]
Loss	22.	4 February 2008	Midland Tennis Classic, United States	Hard (i)	(South Africa) Surina De Beer	(United States) Ashley Harkleroad (United States) Shenay Perry	6–3, 4–6, [6–10]
Win	23.	7 April 2008	ITF Monzón, Spain	Hard	(Switzerland) Emmanuelle Gagliardi	(Spain) María José Martínez Sánchez (Spain) Arantxa Parra Santonja	1–6, 7–6^{(7–5)}, [10–8]
Win	24.	27 October 2008	ITF Tokyo, Japan	Hard	(Japan) Kimiko Date-Krumm	(Chinese Taipei) Chan Chin-wei (Chinese Taipei) Chen Yi	7–5, 6–3
Win	25.	9 February 2009	Midland Tennis Classic, United States	Hard (i)	(Chinese Taipei) Chen Yi	(United States) Lindsay Lee-Waters (Hungary) Melinda Czink	7–5, 7–6^{(7–5)}
Win	26.	17 May 2009	Open Saint-Gaudens, France	Clay	(South Africa) Chanelle Scheepers	(Japan) Kimiko Date-Krumm (China) Sun Tiantian	7–5, 6–4
Loss	27.	5 June 2009	Nottingham Trophy, UK	Grass	(Greece) Eleni Daniilidou	(United States) Alexa Glatch (South Africa) Natalie Grandin	3–6, 6–2, [7–10]
Loss	28.	2 August 2009	ITF Obihiro, Japan	Carpet	(Japan) Kurumi Nara	(Japan) Natsumi Hamamura (Japan) Ayumi Oka	6–3, 1–6, [5–10]
Loss	29.	10 October 2009	ITF Tokyo Open, Japan	Hard	(Japan) Kimiko Date-Krumm	(Chinese Taipei) Chan Yung-jan (Japan) Ayumi Morita	2–6, 4–6
Win	30.	6 September 2010	ITF Noto, Japan	Carpet	(Thailand) Tamarine Tanasugarn	(Japan) Shuko Aoyama (Japan) Akari Inoue	6–3, 6–3
Win	31.	28 November 2010	Toyota World Challenge, Japan	Carpet (i)	(Japan) Shuko Aoyama	(Romania) Irina-Camelia Begu (Romania) Mădălina Gojnea	1–6, 6–3, [11–9]
Win	32.	16 January 2011	ITF Pingguo, China	Hard (i)	(Japan) Shuko Aoyama	(China) Liu Wanting (China) Sun Shengnan	6–4, 6–3
Loss	33.	25 February 2011	Mildura International, Australia	Grass	(Japan) Kumiko Iijima	(Australia) Casey Dellacqua (Australia) Olivia Rogowska	6–4, 6–7^{(6–8)}, [4–10]
Loss	34.	4 March 2011	ITF Sydney, Australia	Hard	(Japan) Kumiko Iijima	(Australia) Casey Dellacqua (Australia) Olivia Rogowska	6–3, 6–7^{(3–7)}, [4–10]
Loss	35.	20 March 2011	ITF Sanya, China	Hard	(Chinese Taipei) Hsu Wen-hsin	(France) Iryna Brémond (Croatia) Ani Mijačika	6–3, 5–7, [10–12]
Win	36.	27 March 2011	Kunming Open, China	Clay	(Japan) Shuko Aoyama	(Ukraine) Irina Buryachok (Ukraine) Veronika Kapshay	6–3, 6–2
Win	37.	3 April 2011	ITF Wenshan, China	Hard	(Japan) Shuko Aoyama	(China) Liang Chen (China) Tian Ran	6–4, 6–0
Win	38.	8 May 2011	Fukuoka International, Japan	Carpet	(Japan) Shuko Aoyama	(Japan) Aiko Nakamura (Japan) Junri Namigata	7–6^{(7–3)}, 6–0
Loss	39.	15 May 2011	Kurume Cup, Japan	Grass	(Thailand) Tamarine Tanasugarn	(Japan) Ayumi Oka (Japan) Akiko Yonemura	3–6, 7–5, [8–10]
Win	40.	22 May 2011	ITF Karuizawa, Japan	Carpet (i)	(Japan) Shuko Aoyama	(Japan) Natsumi Hamamura (Japan) Ayumi Oka	6–4, 6–4
Win	41.	6 January 2012	ITF Quanzhou, China	Hard	(Japan) Chan Hao-ching	(Japan) Kimiko Date-Krumm (China) Zhang Shuai	4–6, 6–4, [10–7]
Loss	42.	28 April 2013	ITF Wenshan, China	Hard	(Japan) Junri Namigata	(Japan) Miki Miyamura (Thailand) Varatchaya Wongteanchai	5–7, 3–6
Loss	43.	12 May 2013	Fukuoka International, Japan	Carpet	(Japan) Akiko Omae	(Japan) Junri Namigata (Japan) Erika Sema	5–7, 6–3, [7–10]
Loss	44.	12 May 2013	Kurume Cup, Japan	Grass	(Japan) Akiko Omae	(Japan) Kanae Hisami (Japan) Mari Tanaka	4–6, 6–7^{(2–7)}
Win	45.	24 March 2014	ITF Osprey, United States	Clay	(Chinese Taipei) Hsieh Shu-ying	(United States) Irina Falconi (Czech Republic) Eva Hrdinová	6–3, 6–7^{(5–7)}, [10–4]
Win	46.	7 July 2014	ITF Aschaffenburg, Germany	Clay	(Japan) Yuuki Tanaka	(Netherlands) Lesley Kerkhove (Switzerland) Xenia Knoll	6–1, 6–4
Loss	47.	16 March 2015	ITF Kōfu, Japan	Hard	(Japan) Akari Inoue	(Japan) Haruka Kaji (Japan) Aiko Yoshitomi	2–6, 3–6
Win	48.	18 May 2015	ITF Karuizawa, Japan	Grass	(Japan) Miyu Kato	(Japan) Mana Ayukawa (Japan) Makoto Ninomiya	6–2, 6–0
Win	49.	28 May 2016	ITF Karuizawa, Japan	Grass	(Japan) Kotomi Takahata	(Japan) Mana Ayukawa (Japan) Yuuki Tanaka	6–1, 6–4
Win	50.	3 September 2016	ITF Noto, Japan	Carpet	(Japan) Ayaka Okuno	(Japan) Akari Inoue (Japan) Miki Miyamura	6–4, 1–6, [10–6]
Win	51.	5 September 2016	ITF Kyoto, Japan	Hard (i)	(Japan) Miki Miyamura	(Japan) Risa Hasegawa (Japan) Midori Yamamoto	6–1, 6–2
Loss	52.	15 October 2016	ITF Makinohara, Japan	Carpet	(Japan) Erika Sema	(Russia) Ksenia Lykina (Japan) Riko Sawayanagi	4–6, 1–6
Win	53.	12 November 2016	ITF Tokyo Open, Japan	Hard (i)	(Japan) Yuki Naito	(United States) Jamie Loeb (Belgium) An-Sophie Mestach	6–4, 6–7^{(12–14)}, [10–8]
Loss	54.	19 November 2016	Toyota World Challenge, Japan	Carpet (i)	(Japan) Ayaka Okuno	(Russia) Ksenia Lykina (Japan) Akiko Omae	7–6^{(7–4)}, 2–6, [5–10]
Win	55.	10 June 2017	ITF Tokyo, Japan	Hard	(Japan) Kyōka Okamura	(Japan) Momoko Kobori (Japan) Kotomi Takahata	6–2, 6–0
Win	56.	17 June 2017	Kōfu International, Japan	Hard	(Japan) Kyōka Okamura	(Japan) Hiroko Kuwata (Japan) Riko Sawayanagi	7–6^{(7–4)}, 6–3
Win	57.	22 October 2017	ITF Hamamatsu, Japan	Carpet	(Japan) Kyōka Okamura	(China) Lu Jiajing (Japan) Ayaka Okuno	6–2, 6–4
Win	58.	11 November 2017	ITF Tokyo Open, Japan	Hard (i)	(Japan) Yuki Naito	(Japan) Eri Hozumi (Japan) Junri Namigata	6–1, 6–3
Loss	59.	17 March 2018	ITF Toyota, Japan	Hard (i)	(Hungary) Dalma Gálfi	(South Korea) Choi Ji-hee (South Korea) Kim Na-ri	2–6, 3–6
Win	60.	5 May 2018	Kangaroo Cup, Japan	Hard	(Japan) Yuki Naito	(Russia) Ksenia Lykina (United Kingdom) Emily Webley-Smith	7–5, 6–4
Loss	61.	1 June 2018	Grado Tennis Cup, Italy	Clay	(Australia) Naiktha Bains	(Italy) Giorgia Marchetti (Italy) Alice Matteucci	0–6, 4–6

== Performance timelines ==
Key
W	F	SF	QF	#R	RR	Q#	DNQ	A	NH

(W) winner; (F) finalist; (SF) semifinalist; (QF) quarterfinalist; (#R) rounds 4, 3, 2, 1; (RR) round-robin stage; (Q#) qualification round; (DNQ) did not qualify; (A) absent; (NH) not held; (SR) strike rate (events won / competed); (W–L) win–loss record.

=== Singles ===
Tournament	2001	2002	2003	2004	2005	2006	2007	2008	2009	2010	2011	2012	2013-2014	SR	W–L	Win %
Grand Slam tournaments
Australian Open	A	Q2	Q1	A	Q1	1R	A	Q1	Q1	Q1	A	Q1	A	0 / 1	0–1	0%
French Open	Q3	Q3	A	Q1	1R	A	A	Q1	Q2	A	A	Q1	A	0 / 1	0–1	0%
Wimbledon	Q1	Q2	A	A	1R	A	A	1R	Q1	Q1	A	A	A	0 / 2	0–2	0%
US Open	Q3	Q2	Q1	Q3	1R	A	Q1	Q3	Q1	Q1	Q3	A	A	0 / 1	0–1	0%
Win–loss	0–0	0–0	0–0	0–0	0–3	0–1	0–0	0–1	0–0	0–0	0–0	0–0	0–0	0 / 5	0–5	0%
WTA 1000
Dubai / Qatar Open (Note: The first Premier 5 event of the year has switched back and forth between the Dubai Tennis Championships and the Qatar Ladies Open since 2009. Dubai was classified as a Premier 5 event from 2009 to 2011 before being succeeded by Doha for the 2012–2014 period. In 2015, Dubai regained its Premier 5 status while Doha was demoted to Premier status. The two tournaments have since alternated status every year.)	Not Tier I							A	A	A	A	A	A	0 / 0	0–0	–
Indian Wells Open	A	A	A	A	4R	Q2	A	Q2	A	A	A	A	A	0 / 1	3–1	75%
Miami Open	A	A	A	A	A	Q1	A	A	A	A	A	A	A	0 / 0	0–0	–
Madrid Open	Not Held								A	A	A	A	A	0 / 0	0–0	–
Italian Open	A	Q1	A	A	A	A	A	A	A	A	A	A	A	0 / 0	0–0	–
Canadian Open	A	A	A	A	2R	A	A	A	A	A	A	A	A	0 / 1	1–1	50%
Charleston Open	A	1R	A	A	Q1	A	A	A	A	A	A	A	A	0 / 1	0–1	0%
Pan Pacific / Wuhan Open (Note: In 2014, the Pan Pacific Open was downgraded to a Premier event and replaced by the Wuhan Open.)	Not Tier I	1R	Q1	Q1	A	1R	A	Q2	A	A	A	A	A	0 / 2	0–2	0%
China Open	NH	Not Tier I							A	A	A	A	A	0 / 0	0–0	–
Win–loss	0–0	0–2	0–0	0–0	4–2	0–1	0–0	0–0	0–0	0–0	0–0	0–0	0–0	0 / 5	4–5	44%

=== Doubles ===
Tournament	2002	2003	2004	2005	2006	2007	2008	2009	2010	2011	2012	2013	2014	SR	W–L	Win%
Australian Open	QF	1R	A	3R	1R	A	A	A	A	A	3R	1R	A	0 / 6	7–6	54%
French Open	SF	1R	3R	1R	A	A	A	A	A	A	1R	A	A	0 / 5	6–5	55%
Wimbledon	3R	1R	2R	1R	A	A	A	1R	A	1R	1R	A	A	0 / 7	3–7	30%
US Open	A	1R	1R	3R	A	2R	1R	A	A	A	A	A	A	0 / 5	3–5	38%
Win–loss	9–3	0–4	3–3	4–4	0–1	1–1	0–1	0–1	0–0	0–1	2–3	0–1	0–0	0 / 23	19–23	45%
WTA 1000
Dubai / Qatar Open	Not Tier I							A	A	A	2R	A	A	0 / 1	1–1	50%
Indian Wells Open	A	A	A	1R	QF	A	1R	A	A	A	A	A	A	0 / 3	2–3	40%
Miami Open	A	A	A	A	A	A	A	A	A	A	A	A	A	0 / 0	0–0	–
Madrid Open	Not Held								A	A	A	A	A	0 / 0	0–0	–
Italian Open	QF	A	A	A	A	A	A	A	A	A	A	A	A	0 / 1	2–1	67%
Canadian Open	F	A	A	1R	A	A	A	A	A	A	A	A	A	0 / 2	4–2	50%
Charleston Open	QF	1R	A	A	A	A	A	A	A	A	A	A	A	0 / 2	2–2	50%
Pan Pacific / Wuhan Open	Q2	1R	A	A	A	A	1R	A	A	1R	A	A	1R	0 / 4	0–4	0%
China Open	Not Tier I							A	A	A	A	A	A	0 / 0	0–0	–
Win–loss	8–3	0–2	0–0	0–2	2–1	0–0	0–2	0–0	0–0	0–1	1–1	0–0	0–1	0 / 13	11–13	46%
