= Akiko Yonemura =

Japanese tennis player (born 1984)

- Country (sports): Japan
- Born: 25 January 1984 (age 41); Kumamoto, Japan
- Prize money: $160,615

Singles
- Career record: 246–221
- Career titles: 3 ITF
- Highest ranking: No. 208 (12 May 2008)

Grand Slam singles results
- Australian Open: Q1 (2008)
- French Open: Q2 (2008)
- Wimbledon: Q1 (2008)
- US Open: Q1 (2007, 2008)

Doubles
- Career record: 189–140
- Career titles: 15 ITF
- Highest ranking: No. 137 (28 April 2008)

Akiko Yonemura (米村明子, Yonemura Akiko, born 25 January 1984) is a Japanese former professional tennis player.

On 12 May 2008, she reached her career-high singles ranking of world No. 208. In April 2008, she reached her best doubles ranking of No. 137.

In her career, she won three singles and 15 doubles titles on the ITF Women's Circuit. Akiko is the sister of Tomoko Yonemura.

== ITF Circuit finals ==
$100,000 tournaments
$75,000 tournaments
$50,000 tournaments
$25,000 tournaments
$10,000 tournaments

=== Singles: 12 (3–9) ===
Result	No.	Date	Tournament	Surface	Opponent	Score
Loss	1.	23 October 2005	ITF Makinohara, Japan	Carpet	(Russia) Alisa Kleybanova	0–6, 1–6
Loss	2.	4 June 2006	Gunma, Japan	Carpet	(United States) Abigail Spears	3–6, 6–2, 6–7^{(6)}
Loss	3.	24 September 2006	Ibaraki, Japan	Hard	(Japan) Shiho Hisamatsu	2–6, 6–3, 5–7
Win	1.	21 October 2007	Makinohara, Japan	Carpet	(Japan) Seiko Okamoto	6–3, 6–4
Loss	4.	19 October 2008	Makinohara, Japan	Carpet	(Chinese Taipei) Hsieh Su-wei	1–6, 6–3, 3–6
Loss	5.	20 September 2009	Kyoto, Japan	Carpet (i)	(Thailand) Nungnadda Wannasuk	6–1, 3–6, 4–6
Loss	6.	27 March 2010	Kofu, Japan	Hard	(Japan) Sachie Ishizu	6–1, 1–6, 0–6
Win	2.	30 May 2010	Kusatsu, Japan	Carpet	(Japan) Junri Namigata	6–4, 7–6^{(4)}
Loss	7.	17 September 2011	Kyoto, Japan	Carpet (i)	(Japan) Kazusa Ito	3–6, 6–3, 4–6
Win	3.	1 April 2012	Nishitama, Japan	Hard	(Japan) Kumiko Iijima	1–1 ret.
Loss	8.	23 June 2013	Tokyo, Japan	Hard	(Japan) Shiho Akita	4–6, 4–6
Loss	9.	14 September 2013	ITF Kyoto, Japan	Carpet (i)	(Japan) Hiroko Kuwata	1–6, 2–6

=== Doubles: 30 (15–15) ===
Result	No.	Date	Tournament	Surface	Partner	Opponents	Score
Loss	1.	23 September 2003	ITF Hiroshima, Japan	Grass	(Japan) Satomi Kinjo	(Japan) Tomoko Taira (Japan) Nami Urabe	3–6, 3–6
Loss	2.	5 September 2004	Saitama, Japan	Hard	(Japan) Tomoko Taira	(South Korea) Kim Hea-mi (Japan) Keiko Taguchi	4–6, 0–6
Loss	3.	31 October 2004	Tokyo, Japan	Hard	(Japan) Maki Arai	(Japan) Kumiko Iijima (Japan) Junri Namigata	3–6, 1–6
Loss	4.	21 August 2005	Nanjing, China	Hard	(Japan) Tomoko Sugano	(Russia) Julia Efremova (China) Xie Yanze	4–6, 3–6
Loss	5.	4 June 2006	Gunma, Japan	Carpet	(Japan) Ryoko Takemura	(Australia) Christina Horiatopoulos (Australia) Trudi Musgrave	1–6, 7–5, 2–6
Win	1.	13 May 2007	Fukuoka International, Japan	Carpet	(Japan) Ayumi Morita	(Japan) Rika Fujiwara (Japan) Junri Namigata	6–2, 6–2
Loss	6.	27 May 2007	Nagano, Japan	Carpet	(Japan) Mari Tanaka	(Japan) Natsumi Hamamura (Japan) Ayaka Maekawa	6–7^{(2)}, 3–6
Win	2.	3 June 2007	Gunma, Japan	Carpet	(Japan) Kumiko Iijima	(Chinese Taipei) Chen Yi (South Korea) Yoo Mi	6–4, 6–4
Win	3.	8 July 2007	Nagoya, Japan	Hard	(Japan) Junri Namigata	(South Korea) Chang Kyung-mi (South Korea) Kim Jin-hee	6–2, 3–6, 6–4
Loss	7.	5 August 2007	Obihiro, Japan	Carpet	(Japan) Ayumi Morita	(Japan) Kumiko Iijima (Japan) Junri Namigata	6–7^{(3)}, 0–6
Loss	8.	13 September 2007	Tokyo, Japan	Hard	(Japan) Kumiko Iijima	(Japan) Junri Namigata (Japan) Rika Fujiwara	6–3, 6–7^{(4)}, [5–10]
Win	4.	6 July 2008	Waterloo, Canada	Clay	(Japan) Tomoko Yonemura	(United States) Lauren Albanese (United States) Alexandra Mueller	6–1, 4–6, [10–3]
Loss	9.	25 October 2008	Hamanako, Japan	Carpet	(Japan) Junri Namigata	(Japan) Kanae Hisami (Japan) Yurina Koshino	5–7, 4–6
Win	5.	10 May 2009	Fukuoka International, Japan	Grass	(Japan) Tomoko Yonemura	(Japan) Ayaka Maekawa (Japan) Junri Namigata	6–2, 6–7^{(3)}, [10–3]
Win	6.	24 May 2009	Nagano, Japan	Carpet	(Japan) Junri Namigata	(Japan) Tomoyo Takagishi (Thailand) Varatchaya Wongteanchai	6–1, 6–4
Loss	10.	29 November 2009	Toyota World Challenge, Japan	Carpet (i)	(Japan) Akari Inoue	(New Zealand) Marina Erakovic (Thailand) Tamarine Tanasugarn	1–6, 4–6
Win	7.	23 May 2010	ITF Karuizawa, Japan	Carpet	(Japan) Ayumi Oka	(China) Sun Shengnan (China) Xu Yifan	7–6^{(1)}, 6–3
Win	8.	4 July 2010	ITF Pozoblanco, Spain	Hard	(Japan) Tomoko Yonemura	(Ukraine) Valentyna Ivakhnenko (Ukraine) Kateryna Kozlova	6–4, 3–6, [10–4]
Win	9.	24 July 2010	ITF Nonthaburi, Thailand	Hard	(Japan) Tomoko Yonemura	(South Korea) Kim So-jung (Japan) Remi Tezuka	6–2, 6–4
Loss	11.	29 August 2010	ITF Saitama, Japan	Hard	(Japan) Kumiko Iijima	(Japan) Akari Inoue (Japan) Kotomi Takahata	3–6, 3–6
Win	10.	5 September 2010	ITF Tsukuba, Japan	Hard	(Japan) Kumiko Iijima	(Chinese Taipei) Chan Chin-wei (Chinese Taipei) Chen Yi	4–6, 7–6 ^{(6)}, [10–7]
Win	11.	15 May 2011	Kurume Cup, Japan	Grass	(Japan) Ayumi Oka	(Japan) Rika Fujiwara (Thailand) Tamarine Tanasugarn	6–3, 5–7, [10–8]
Loss	12.	8 October 2011	Kōfu International Open, Japan	Hard	(Japan) Remi Tezuka	(Chinese Taipei) Chan Chin-wei (Chinese Taipei) Hsu Wen-hsin	3–6, 4–6
Loss	13.	22 October 2011	ITF Makinohara, Japan	Carpet	(Japan) Junri Namigata	(Japan) Shuko Aoyama (Japan) Kotomi Takahata	2–6, 5–7
Win	12.	9 September 2012	ITF Noto, Japan	Grass	(Japan) Kumiko Iijima	(Japan) Miki Miyamura (Japan) Mari Tanaka	6–1, 4–6, [10–5]
Loss	14.	23 June 2013	ITF Tokyo, Japan	Hard	(Japan) Kumiko Iijima	(Japan) Makoto Ninomiya (Japan) Yuka Mori	4–6, 3–6
Win	13.	24 March 2014	ITF Nishitama, Japan	Hard	(Japan) Junri Namigata	(South Korea) Choi Ji-hee (Japan) Akari Inoue	6–2, 6–4
Loss	15.	13 May 2014	Kurume Cup, Japan	Grass	(Japan) Junri Namigata	(Australia) Jarmila Gajdošová (Australia) Arina Rodionova	4–6, 2–6
Win	14.	20 May 2014	ITF Karuizawa, Japan	Hard	(Japan) Junri Namigata	(Japan) Kanae Hisami (Japan) Chiaki Okadaue	6–2, 7–5
Win	15.	24 March 2015	ITF Nishitama, Japan	Hard	(Japan) Kyōka Okamura	(Japan) Kanae Hisami (Japan) Kotomi Takahata	2–6, 6–2, [10–5]
