= Maiko Inoue =

Japanese tennis player (born 1979)

- Full name: Maiko Inoue Sato
- Country (sports): Japan
- Born: 5 February 1979 (age 46); Okinawa, Japan
- Plays: Right-handed
- Prize money: $73,982

Singles
- Career titles: 2 ITF
- Highest ranking: No. 299 (29 September 1997)

Doubles
- Career titles: 9 ITF
- Highest ranking: No. 139 (9 July 2001)

Maiko Inoue Sato (井上 摩衣子, Inoue Maiko, born 5 February 1979) is a Japanese former tennis player. She is a younger sister of Haruka Inoue.

A right-handed player, Inoue began competing on the professional tour in the late 1990s. She left the tour in 2003, before returning in 2007 and featuring as a doubles specialist.

During her career she was most successful in doubles, with a best ranking of 139. She made several WTA Tour main-draw appearances in doubles and won nine doubles titles on the ITF Women's Circuit. As a singles player, she was ranked as high as 299 in the world, winning two ITF titles.

Inoue, who retired in 2012, is married to former tennis player Bumpei Sato.

== ITF finals ==
$25,000 tournaments
$10,000 tournaments

=== Singles (2–2) ===
Result	No.	Date	Tournament	Surface	Opponent	Score
Loss	1.	30 September 1996	Ibaraki, Japan	Hard	(Japan) Keiko Nagatomi	4–6, 4–6
Win	1.	22 November 1998	Haibara, Japan	Clay	(Japan) Keiko Ishida	6–4, 6–3
Win	2.	29 November 1998	Nagasaki, Japan	Grass	(Japan) Rika Fujiwara	6–1, 3–6, 7–6^{(3)}
Loss	2.	18 September 2002	Kyoto, Japan	Hard (i)	(Japan) Tomoko Yonemura	3–6, 3–6

=== Doubles (9–11) ===
Result	No.	Date	Tournament	Surface	Partner	Opponents	Score
Win	1.	17 February 1997	Faro, Portugal	Hard	(Japan) Riei Kawamata	(France) Sylvie Sallaberry (Switzerland) Aliénor Tricerri	6–3, 6–2
Loss	1.	16 November 1998	Haibara Japan	Clay	(Japan) Yasuko Nishimata	(Japan) Keiko Ishida (Japan) Tomoko Ishida	7–5, 6–7^{(7)}, 3–6
Win	2.	30 August 1999	Kuroshio, Japan	Hard	(Australia) Kerry-Anne Guse	(South Africa) Mareze Joubert (United Kingdom) Kate Warne Holland	6–4, 7–6^{(3)}
Loss	2.	12 December 1999	Manila, Philippines	Hard	(Japan) Haruka Inoue	(China) Li Ting (China) Li Na	3–6, 2–6
Win	3.	10 January 2000	Boca Raton, United States	Hard	(China) Li Ting	(Czech Republic) Olga Blahotová (Czech Republic) Gabriela Chmelinová	4–6, 6–2, 6–3
Loss	3.	26 March 2000	Stone Mountain, United States	Hard	(Japan) Haruka Inoue	(Australia) Trudi Musgrave (Australia) Bryanne Stewart	4–6, 6–2, 6–7
Loss	4.	14 October 2001	Saga, Japan	Grass	(Japan) Shiho Hisamatsu	(Japan) Rika Hiraki (Japan) Nana Smith	0–6, 1–6
Loss	5.	8 September 2002	Kyoto, Japan	Hard (i)	(Japan) Shiho Hisamatsu	(Japan) Shizu Katsumi (Japan) Akiko Kinebuchi	4–6, 6–2, 2–6
Loss	6.	15 September 2002	Hiroshima, Japan	Clay	(Japan) Keiko Taguchi	(Sweden) Helena Ejeson (Denmark) Andrea Munch-Hermansen	6–3, 3–6, 2–6
Win	4.	22 September 2002	Kyoto, Japan	Hard (i)	(Japan) Shiho Hisamatsu	(Japan) Maki Arai (Japan) Kaori Aoyama	7–5, 7–5
Loss	7.	20 October 2002	Haibara, Japan	Carpet	(Japan) Haruka Inoue	(Japan) Remi Tezuka (Japan) Yuka Yoshida	0–6, 2–6
Win	5.	27 October 2002	Tokyo, Japan	Hard	(Japan) Haruka Inoue	(Japan) Keiko Taguchi (Japan) Nami Urabe	6–1, 6–2
Loss	8.	19 August 2007	Tokyo, Japan	Carpet	(Japan) Mari Inoue	(China) Zhao Yijing (China) Song Shanshan	3–6, 1–6
Win	6.	2 September 2007	Saitama, Japan	Hard	(Japan) Mayumi Yamamoto	(Japan) Tomoko Dokei (Japan) Yukiko Yabe	6–4, 7–5
Loss	9.	31 August 2008	Saitama, Japan	Hard	(Japan) Airi Hagimoto	(Chinese Taipei) Hsu Wen-hsin (Chinese Taipei) Hwang I-hsuan	4–6, 3–6
Win	7.	8 August 2009	Niigata, Japan	Carpet	(Japan) Airi Hagimoto	(Japan) Maki Arai (Japan) Etsuko Kitazaki	6–2, 6–2
Loss	10.	29 August 2009	Saitama, Japan	Hard	(Japan) Airi Hagimoto	(Japan) Maki Arai (Japan) Mari Tanaka	2–6, 4–6
Loss	11.	26 March 2010	Kofu, Japan	Hard	(Japan) Shiho Hisamatsu	(Japan) Maki Arai (Japan) Seiko Okamoto	4–6, 4–6
Win	8.	11 July 2010	Tokyo, Japan	Carpet	(Japan) Maki Arai	(Japan) Airi Hagimoto (Japan) Kaori Onishi	6–2, 7–5
Win	9.	17 June 2012	Tokyo, Japan	Hard	(Japan) Kaori Onishi	(Japan) Akari Inoue (Japan) Hiroko Kuwata	5–7, 7–5, [10–7]
