= Tomoko Yonemura =

Japanese tennis player (born 1982)

- Country (sports): Japan
- Born: 7 January 1982 (age 44) Kumamoto, Japan
- Turned pro: 1998
- Retired: 2015
- Prize money: $185,225

Singles
- Career record: 218–194
- Career titles: 7 ITF
- Highest ranking: 148 (4 May 2009)

Grand Slam singles results
- Australian Open: Q1 (2009, 2010)
- French Open: Q1 (2009, 2010)
- Wimbledon: Q2 (2009)
- US Open: Q2 (2008)

Doubles
- Career record: 140–120
- Career titles: 11 ITF
- Highest ranking: 144 (11 April 2005)

Tomoko Yonemura (米村知子, Yonemura Tomoko; born 7 January 1982) is a Japanese former tennis player.

On 4 May 2009, she achieved her career-high singles ranking of world No. 148. On 11 April 2005, she peaked at No. 144 in the doubles rankings.

Tomoko, the sister of Akiko Yonemura, won seven singles and eleven doubles titles on the ITF Women's Circuit.

Last match played in 2011, Yonemura retired from professional tennis 2015.

== ITF Circuit finals ==
Legend
$60,000 tournaments
$25,000 tournaments
$10,000 tournaments

=== Singles: 10 (7 titles, 3 runner-ups) ===
Result	No.	Date	Tournament	Surface	Opponent	Score
Win	1.	18 September 2002	ITF Kyoto, Japan	Hard (i)	(Japan) Maiko Inoue	6–3, 6–3
Win	2.	28 September 2003	ITF Hiroshima, Japan	Grass	(Japan) Tomoyo Takagishi	6–4, 6–1
Win	3.	5 September 2004	ITF Saitama, Japan	Hard	(Japan) Maya Kato	6–3, 6–3
Win	4.	28 May 2006	ITF Nagano, Japan	Carpet	(United Kingdom) Sarah Borwell	7–5, ret.
Loss	5.	16 July 2006	ITF Miyazaki, Japan	Carpet	(Japan) Erika Takao	5–7, 3–6
Win	6.	11 May 2008	Fukuoka International, Japan	Carpet	(Thailand) Tamarine Tanasugarn	6–1, 2–6, 7–6^{(10–8)}
Win	7.	31 May 2008	ITF Gunma, Japan	Carpet	(Japan) Kumiko Iijima	6–0, 6–3
Loss	8.	3 May 2009	Kangaroo Cup, Japan	Carpet	(Japan) Aiko Nakamura	1–6, 4–6
Win	9.	4 October 2009	ITF Hamanako, Japan	Carpet	(Japan) Misaki Doi	6–4, 7–6^{(7–3)}
Loss	10.	24 July 2010	ITF Nonthaburi, Thailand	Hard	(Thailand) Nudnida Luangnam	6–2, 5–7, 1–6

=== Doubles: 21 (11 titles, 10 runner-ups) ===
Result	No.	Date	Tournament	Surface	Partner	Opponent	Score
Loss	1.	24 June 2001	ITF Montréal, Canada	Hard	(Japan) Ayano Takeuchi	(Japan) Kaori Aoyama (Japan) Maki Arai	1–6, 3–6
Loss	2.	1 July 2001	ITF Lachine, Canada	Hard	(Japan) Ayano Takeuchi	(United States) Adria Engel (Switzerland) Aliénor Tricerri	2–6, 1–6
Win	3.	18 May 2003	ITF Nagano, Japan	Grass	(Japan) Tomoko Taira	(Japan) Maki Arai (Japan) Aiko Nakamura	6–3, 6–1
Loss	4.	8 June 2003	ITF Seoul, South Korea	Hard	(Malaysia) Khoo Chin-bee	(Japan) Shiho Hisamatsu (South Korea) Jeon Mi-ra	3–6, 1–6
Loss	5.	19 October 2003	ITF Haibara, Japan	Carpet	(Japan) Ayami Takase	(Japan) Shiho Hisamatsu (South Korea) Jeon Mi-ra	2–6, 7–5, 3–6
Loss	6.	6 June 2004	ITF Changwon, South Korea	Hard	(Japan) Ayami Takase	(South Korea) Chang Kyung-mi (South Korea) Kim Jin-hee	5–7, 4–6
Win	7.	17 July 2004	ITF Gunma, Japan	Carpet	(Japan) Mayumi Yamamoto	(Japan) Kaori Aoyama (Japan) Ayami Takase	6–4, 4–6, 6–3
Loss	8.	27 March 2005	ITF San Luis Potosí, Mexico	Clay	(Brazil) Joana Cortez	(Spain) Lourdes Domínguez Lino (Argentina) Clarisa Fernández	2–6, 2–6
Win	9.	29 May 2005	ITF Nagano, Japan	Carpet	(Japan) Ryoko Takemura	(South Korea) Kim Hea-mi (Japan) Keiko Taguchi	6–1, 7–6^{(7–5)}
Win	10.	24 September 2005	ITF Ibaraki, Japan	Hard	(Japan) Ryoko Takemura	(South Korea) Jeon Mi-ra (Japan) Ayami Takase	6–2, 6–4
Win	11.	23 October 2005	ITF Makinohara, Japan	Carpet	(Japan) Ryoko Takemura	(Japan) Seiko Okamoto (Japan) Ayami Takase	6–4, 6–3
Loss	12.	28 May 2006	ITF Nagano, Japan	Carpet	(Japan) Remi Tezuka	(Japan) Kumiko Iijima (Japan) Junri Namigata	3–6, 6–7^{(3–7)}
Win	13.	6 July 2008	ITF Waterloo, Canada	Clay	(Japan) Akiko Yonemura	(United States) Lauren Albanese (United States) Alexandra Mueller	6–1, 4–6, [10–3]
Loss	14.	20 July 2008	ITF Miyazaki, Japan	Carpet	(Japan) Kimiko Date-Krumm	(Japan) Misaki Doi (Japan) Kurumi Nara	6–4, 3–6, [7–10]
Loss	15.	22 March 2009	ITF Redding, United States	Hard	(Russia) Alexandra Panova	(Belarus) Anna Orlik (Slovenia) Maša Zec-Peškirič	6–7^{(4–7)}, 4–6
Win	16.	10 May 2009	Fukuoka International, Japan	Grass	(Japan) Akiko Yonemura	(Japan) Ayaka Maekawa (Japan) Junri Namigata	6–2, 6–7^{(3–7)}, [10–3]
Loss	17.	26 September 2009	ITF Miyazaki, Japan	Carpet	(Japan) Mari Tanaka	(Japan) Kurumi Nara (Japan) Erika Sema	0–6, 0–6
Win	18.	2 May 2010	Kangaroo Cup, Japan	Hard	(Japan) Erika Sema	(Russia) Ksenia Lykina (United Kingdom) Melanie South	6–3, 2–6, [10–7]
Win	19.	30 May 2010	ITF Kusatsu, Japan	Carpet	(Japan) Kumiko Iijima	(Japan) Maya Kato (Japan) Ayaka Maekawa	6–7^{(5–7)}, 6–4, [10–8]
Win	20.	4 July 2010	ITF Pozoblanco, Spain	Hard	(Japan) Akiko Yonemura	(Ukraine) Valentyna Ivakhnenko (Ukraine) Kateryna Kozlova	6–4, 3–6, [10–4]
Win	21.	24 July 2010	ITF Nonthaburi, Thailand	Hard	(Japan) Akiko Yonemura	(South Korea) Kim So-jung (Japan) Remi Tezuka	6–2, 6–4
