= Seiko Okamoto =

Japanese tennis player (born 1978)

Seiko Okamoto 岡本 聖子
- Country (sports): Japan
- Born: 14 March 1978 (age 48) Tokyo, Japan
- Turned pro: 2000
- Retired: 2010
- Plays: Right-handed
- Prize money: $207,531

Singles
- Career record: 264–264
- Career titles: 2 ITF
- Highest ranking: No. 178 (16 January 2006)

Grand Slam singles results
- Australian Open: Q2 (2008)
- French Open: Q1 (2006)
- Wimbledon: Q3 (2005)
- US Open: Q2 (2005)

Doubles
- Career record: 223–166
- Career titles: 1 WTA, 15 ITF
- Highest ranking: No. 123 (1 November 2004)

Grand Slam doubles results
- Australian Open: 1R (2004, 2005)
Medal record
Representing Japan
Summer Universiade
| Bronze medal – third place | 1997 Catania | Women's doubles |
| Bronze medal – third place | 1999 Palma de Mallorca | Women's doubles |
| Bronze medal – third place | 1999 Palma de Mallorca | Mixed doubles |

Seiko Okamoto (岡本 聖子, Okamoto Seiko) (born 14 March 1978) is a Japanese former professional tennis player.

Okamoto took part in the 2006 Bangalore Open but lost in the first round of singles qualifying, and the first round of doubles, alongside Ryōko Fuda. She has stated that her favorite surface to play on is hardcourt.

In her career, Okamoto won one doubles title on the WTA Tour, as well as two singles and 15 doubles titles on the ITF Women's Circuit.

== WTA career finals ==
=== Doubles: 1 (1 title) ===
| Result | Date | Tournament | Tier | Surface | Partner | Opponents | Score |
|---|---|---|---|---|---|---|---|
| Win | Jan 2004 | Hobart International, Australia | Tier V | Hard | (Japan) Shinobu Asagoe | (Belgium) Els Callens (Austria) Barbara Schett | 2–6, 6–4, 6–3 |

== ITF Circuit finals ==
$50,000 tournaments
$25,000 tournaments
$10,000 tournaments

=== Singles: 10 (2–8) ===
| Result | No. | Date | Tournament | Surface | Opponent | Score |
|---|---|---|---|---|---|---|
| Win | 1. | 20 November 2000 | Kōfu Open, Japan | Carpet | (Japan) Keiko Taguchi | 4–1, 1–3, 4–1 |
| Loss | 2. | 22 July 2002 | ITF Incheon, South Korea | Hard | (South Korea) Kim Mi-ok | 6–4, 3–6, 4–6 |
| Loss | 3. | 19 October 2003 | ITF Haibara, Japan | Hard | (Japan) Yuka Yoshida | 1–6, 4–6 |
| Loss | 4. | 13 May 2004 | ITF Beijing, China | Hard | (China) Li Na | 4–6, 4–6 |
| Loss | 5. | 27 February 2005 | ITF Taipei, Taiwan | Hard | (Chinese Taipei) Latisha Chan | 3–6, 2–6 |
| Loss | 6. | 28 May 2005 | ITF Nagano, Japan | Carpet | (Japan) Mayumi Yamamoto | 2–6, 2–6 |
| Loss | 7. | 5 June 2005 | ITF Gunma, Japan | Carpet | (Chinese Taipei) Hsieh Su-wei | 1–6, 2–6 |
| Loss | 8. | 29 October 2006 | ITF Hamanako, Japan | Carpet | (Japan) Shiho Hisamatsu | 2–6, 4–6 |
| Win | 9. | 15 April 2007 | ITF Ho Chi Minh City, Vietnam | Hard | (Japan) Erika Takao | 6–1, 6–2 |
| Loss | 10. | 21 October 2007 | ITF Makinohara, Japan | Carpet | (Japan) Akiko Yonemura | 3–6, 4–6 |

=== Doubles: 33 (15–18) ===
| Result | No. | Date | Tournament | Surface | Partner | Opponents | Score |
|---|---|---|---|---|---|---|---|
| Loss | 1. | 23 November 1998 | ITF Nagasaki, Japan | Grass | (Japan) Keiko Taguchi | (Japan) Akiko Gunji (Japan) Keiko Ishida | 2–6, 2–6 |
| Win | 2. | 6 June 1999 | ITF Little Rock, United States | Hard | (Japan) Keiko Taguchi | (South Korea) Chang Kyung-mi (South Korea) Chae Kyung-yee | 7–5, 6–2 |
| Win | 3. | 28 November 1999 | ITF Kōfu, Japan | Carpet | (Japan) Keiko Taguchi | (Japan) Remi Tezuka (Japan) Maki Arai | 7–6, 0–6, 7–5 |
| Win | 4. | 13 November 2000 | ITF Haibara, Japan | Clay | (Japan) Keiko Taguchi | (Japan) Akiko Gunji (Japan) Keiko Ishida | 2–4, 4–0, 5–3, 3–5, 4–2 |
| Win | 5. | 20 November 2000 | ITF Kōfu, Japan | Carpet | (Japan) Keiko Taguchi | (Japan) Kumiko Iijima (Japan) Maki Arai | 3–5, 4–1, 5–4, 4–1 |
| Win | 6. | 3 September 2001 | ITF Kugayama, Japan | Hard | (Japan) Nami Urabe | (Australia) Melissa Dowse (Australia) Samantha Stosur | 6–4, 2–6, 6–1 |
| Loss | 7. | 26 September 2001 | ITF Kyoto, Japan | Hard | (Japan) Nami Urabe | (Australia) Melissa Dowse (Australia) Samantha Stosur | 3–6, 6–3, 2–6 |
| Loss | 8. | 10 February 2002 | ITF Faro, Portugal | Hard | (Japan) Satomi Kinjo | (Japan) Remi Tezuka (Japan) Maki Arai | 5–7, 7–6, 2–6 |
| Win | 9. | 30 June 2002 | ITF Lachine, Canada | Hard | (Japan) Shizu Katsumi | (United States) Adria Engel (United States) Kristina Kraszewski | w/o |
| Win | 10. | 21 July 2002 | ITF Seoul, South Korea | Hard | (Japan) Maki Arai | (South Korea) Chang Kyung-mi (South Korea) Chae Kyung-yee | 6–3, 5–7, 6–4 |
| Loss | 11. | 20 April 2003 | ITF Ho Chi Minh City, Vietnam | Hard | (Japan) Shiho Hisamatsu | (South Korea) Choi Jin-young (South Korea) Kim Mi-ok | 1–6, 2–6 |
| Win | 12. | 1 June 2003 | ITF Houston, United States | Hard (i) | (Japan) Remi Tezuka | (Republic of Ireland) Yvonne Doyle (South Africa) Nicole Rencken | 5–7, 6–4, 6–3 |
| Loss | 13. | 2 November 2003 | ITF Beijing, China | Hard | (South Korea) Jeon Mi-ra | (China) Yang Shujing (China) Yu Ying | 4–6, 2–6 |
| Loss | 14. | 10 May 2004 | ITF Karuizawa, Japan | Carpet | (Japan) Ryōko Fuda | (Japan) Rika Fujiwara (South Korea) Jeon Mi-ra | 2–6, 6–2, 6–7 |
| Win | 15. | 11 July 2004 | ITF College Park, United States | Hard | (Japan) Shiho Hisamatsu | (Belarus) Natallia Dziamidzenka (United States) Kaysie Smashey | 7–6^{(5)}, 6–2 |
| Loss | 16. | 21 February 2005 | ITF Taipei, Taiwan | Hard | (Japan) Ryōko Fuda | (Chinese Taipei) Chuang Chia-jung (Chinese Taipei) Hsieh Su-wei | 3–6, 2–6 |
| Win | 17. | 1 May 2005 | ITF Hamanako, Japan | Hard | (Japan) Ryōko Fuda | (Japan) Shiho Hisamatsu (Japan) Ayami Takase | 7–5, 6–4 |
| Loss | 18. | 8 May 2005 | Kangaroo Cup, Japan | Carpet | (Japan) Ryōko Fuda | (Japan) Rika Fujiwara (Japan) Saori Obata | 1–6, 2–6 |
| Win | 19. | 14 May 2005 | Fukuoka International, Japan | Carpet | (Japan) Ryōko Fuda | (Chinese Taipei) Latisha Chan (Chinese Taipei) Chuang Chia-jung | 6–2, 7–6 |
| Win | 20. | 22 May 2005 | ITF Changwon, South Korea | Hard | (Chinese Taipei) Chuang Chia-jung | (Chinese Taipei) Chan Chin-wei (Chinese Taipei) Hsieh Su-wei | 6–2, 7–5 |
| Loss | 21. | 23 October 2005 | ITF Makinohara, Japan | Carpet | (Japan) Ayami Takase | (Japan) Ryoko Takemura (Japan) Tomoko Yonemura | 4–6, 3–6 |
| Loss | 22. | 6 November 2005 | ITF Busan, Korea | Hard | (Japan) Ayami Takase | (Russia) Julia Efremova (Indonesia) Wynne Prakusya | 4–6, 7–6^{(6)}, 1–6 |
| Loss | 23. | 11 April 2006 | ITF Jackson, United States | Clay | (Japan) Ayami Takase | (Russia) Maria Kondratieva (France) Sophie Lefèvre | 0–6, 3–6 |
| Loss | 24. | 9 July 2006 | ITF Nagoya, Japan | Hard | (Japan) Ayami Takase | (Chinese Taipei) Chuang Chia-jung (Japan) Shiho Hisamatsu | 2–6, 3–6 |
| Loss | 25. | 16 July 2006 | ITF Miyazaki, Japan | Hard | (Japan) Ayami Takase | (Japan) Maki Arai (Japan) Kumiko Iijima | 2–6, 3–6 |
| Loss | 26. | 23 July 2006 | Kurume Cup, Japan | Carpet | (Japan) Ayami Takase | (Chinese Taipei) Latisha Chan (Chinese Taipei) Chuang Chia-jung | w/o |
| Loss | 27. | 28 October 2006 | ITF Hamanako, Japan | Carpet | (Japan) Maki Arai | (Chinese Taipei) Chuang Chia-jung (Chinese Taipei) Hsieh Su-wei | 6–7^{(2)}, 5–7 |
| Win | 28. | 5 November 2006 | ITF Sutama, Japan | Clay | (Japan) Maki Arai | (Japan) Ryoko Takemura (Japan) Mari Tanaka | 6–2, 6–3 |
| Win | 29. | 19 February 2007 | ITF Clearwater, United States | Hard | (Japan) Ryōko Fuda | (Bosnia and Herzegovina) Mervana Jugić-Salkić (Italy) Antonella Serra Zanetti | 5–7, 6–3, 6–4 |
| Loss | 30. | 9 April 2007 | ITF Ho Chi Minh City, Vietnam | Hard | (Japan) Kumiko Iijima | (China) Han Xinyun (China) Hao Jie | 2–6, 6–1, 3–6 |
| Loss | 31. | 6 May 2007 | ITF Gifu, Japan | Carpet | (Japan) Kumiko Iijima | (Japan) Ayumi Morita (Japan) Ai Sugiyama | 1–6, 6–3, 0–6 |
| Loss | 32. | 18 February 2008 | ITF Clearwater, United States | Hard | (Chinese Taipei) Chan Chin-wei | (United Kingdom) Anna Fitzpatrick (Montenegro) Ana Veselinović | 2–6, 6–3, [6–10] |
| Win | 33. | 26 March 2010 | ITF Kōfu, Japan | Hard | (Japan) Maki Arai | (Japan) Shiho Hisamatsu (Japan) Maiko Inoue | 6–4, 6–4 |
