= Tomoyo Takagishi =

Japanese tennis player (born 1984)

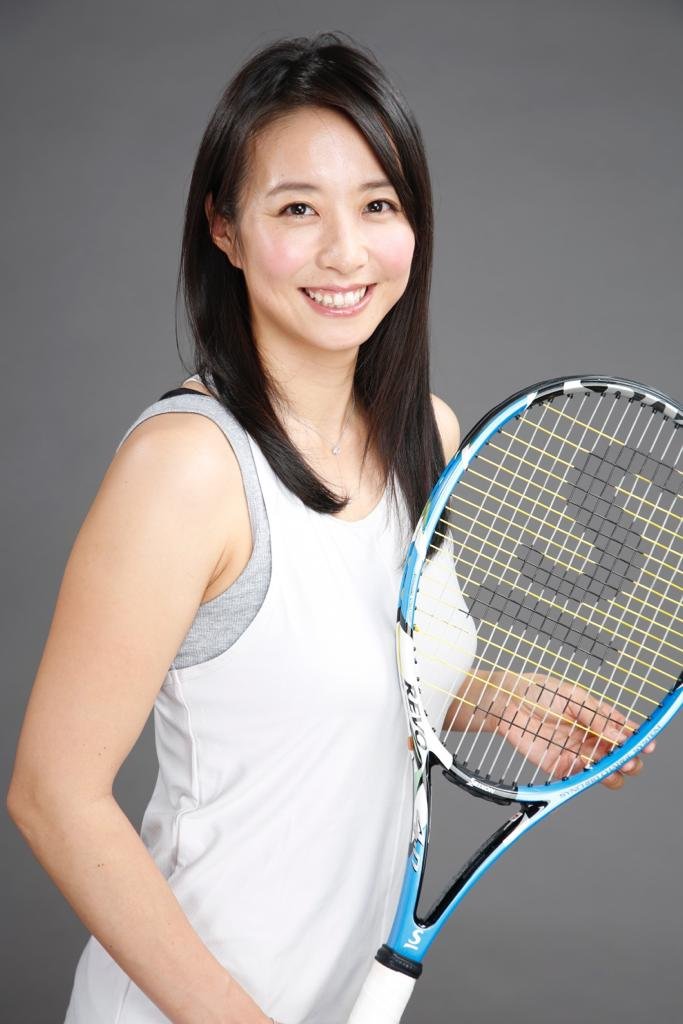
- Native name: 高岸知代
- Country (sports): Japan
- Born: July 16, 1984 (age 42) Toyama City, Toyama Prefecture, Japan
- Height: 1.67 m (5 ft 5 1/2 in)
- Turned pro: 2003
- Retired: 2009
- Plays: Right-handed (two-handed backhand)
- Coach: Yasuki Kasahara
- Prize money: $51,554

Singles
- Highest ranking: No. 396

Doubles
- Highest ranking: No. 307 (11 August 2008)

Tomoyo Takagishi (高岸知代, Takagishi Tomoyo born July 16, 1984) is a former Japanese female professional tennis player from Toyama City, Toyama Prefecture. She won 2 ITF Women circuit tournaments, was runner-up at All Japan indoor championships and in November 2009 she retired from tennis. Her highest WTA ranking was 396th in singles, and 307th in doubles.

== Junior career ==
She entered the national elementary school tennis championship in singles and reached the semifinal. Takagishi won the Nakamuta Cup All Japan national juniors U-15 in 1999. She was the runner-up at All Japan Juniors under 18 in 2002 and ranked No.3 on the ranklist of Japan Tennis Association.

== Professional career ==
She won her first professional title at Hiroshima International Women's Singles (ITF) in September, 2005 where she defeated Kanae Hisami in the final. Takagishi claimed her second tour win at the GS Yuasa Open (ITF Women Circuit) in September, 2006 where she did not lose a set and beat Mayumi Yamamoto in the final. In 2007, she was runner-up at the Shimadzu All Japan Indoor Championship (JTT). In 2008, she played in doubles with Kimiko Date in Kuruma at ITF tournament where they reached the semifinal after beating Wan-Ting Liu/Yi-Jing Zhao in the quarterfinal. Finally she retired from tennis at the 2009 All Japan Tennis Championships (JTT).

== Playing style ==
She was a baseline player who had powerful strokes, countershots.

== Personal life ==
Takagishi was born in Toyama City in Toyama Prefecture, Japan. Her father was a skier. There was a tennis court in front of her parents' house. Her parents enjoyed playing tennis as a hobby on that court. Takagishi often watched Grand Slams such as the French Open and Wimbledon on TV. At that time, her parents liked Steffi Graf, so naturally she also liked it. When she was 7 years old (1st grade), she tried playing tennis. Then due to the influence of Steffi Graf, she started playing tennis at the Isobe Green Tennis Club at the age of 6, and at the age of 10, she was impressed by Shinobu Asagoe playing at the local Inter-High School Championships and she wanted to become a professional player thus she was in search of an environment where she could play tennis in earnest. She joined Ebara SSC in Kanagawa Prefecture and she lived in a female student condominium for college students and spend her days immersed in tennis. She won many titles in age-specific competition. Besides tennis, Takagishi was an excellent long-distance runner. She participated in the 3 km marathon for elementary school students in Toyama City and won the championship. When she was in the 6th grade, she competed in the 1000m race as a school representative and also won the championship. After graduating from high school, she went to Shonan Institute of Technology High School and turned professional in 2003 after graduation. In 2010, she was married to professional tennis player Toshihide Matsui.
