= Haibara, Shizuoka =

Haibara 榛原町
- Former municipality
- Flag Emblem

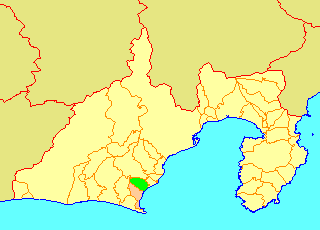
- Location of Haibara in Shizuoka Prefecture

- Location in Japan
- Coordinates: 34.7596°N 138.2222°E
- Country: Japan
- Region: Chūbu (Tōkai)
- Prefecture: Shizuoka Prefecture
- District: Haibara
- Merged: October 11, 2005 (now part of Makinohara)

Area
  - Total: 53.36 km^{2} (20.60 sq mi)

Population (April 1, 2005)
  - Total: 24,989
  - Density: 468.3/km^{2} (1,213/sq mi)
- Time zone: UTC+09:00 (JST)
- Symbols
- Flower: Camellia
- Tree: Osmanthus

Haibara (榛原町, Haibara-chō) was a town located in Haibara District, Shizuoka Prefecture, Japan.

As of April 1, 2005, the town had an estimated population of 24,989 and a density of 468.3 persons per km^{2}. The total area was 53.36 km^{2}.

On October 11, 2005, Haibara, along with town of Sagara (also from Haibara District), was merged to create the city of Makinohara, and thus no longer exists as an independent municipality.
