= 2016 Kurume Best Amenity Cup – Singles =

Singles
- 2016 Kurume Best Amenity Cup

Final
- Champion: (Japan) Kyōka Okamura
- Runner-up: (Uzbekistan) Nigina Abduraimova
- Score: 7–6^{(12–10)}, 1–6, 7–5

Events
Singles	Doubles
← 2015 ·	Kurume Best Amenity Cup	· 2017 →

Nao Hibino was the defending champion, but chose to participate in Nürnberg instead.

Kyōka Okamura won the title, defeating Nigina Abduraimova in the final, 7–6^{(12–10)}, 1–6, 7–5.

== Seeds ==
1. (Belgium) An-Sophie Mestach (semifinals)
2. (Uzbekistan) Nigina Abduraimova (final)
3. (Japan) Erika Sema (second round)
4. (China) Xu Shilin (first round)
5. (Japan) Ayaka Okuno (quarterfinals)
6. (Netherlands) Indy de Vroome (quarterfinals)
7. (Japan) Makoto Ninomiya (second round)
8. (Russia) Ksenia Lykina (semifinals)

== Main draw ==
=== Key ===
- Q = Qualifier
- WC = Wild card
- LL = Lucky loser
- Alt = Alternate
- SE = Special exempt
- PR = Protected ranking
- ITF = ITF entry
- JE = Junior exempt
- w/o = Walkover
- r = Retired
- d = Defaulted
- SR = Special ranking

=== Finals ===
Semifinals
1	(Belgium) An-Sophie Mestach	5	5
(Japan) Kyōka Okamura	7	7
8	(Russia) Ksenia Lykina	1	3
2	(Uzbekistan) Nigina Abduraimova	6	6

Final
(Japan) Kyōka Okamura	7^{12}	1	7
2	(Uzbekistan) Nigina Abduraimova	6^{10}	6	5

=== Top half ===
First round
1	(Belgium) A-S Mestach	6	6
(Japan) Y Tanaka	4	4
WC	(Japan) S Baba	1	3
(Japan) M Miyamura	6	6
WC	(Japan) S Oshino	6	2
(Japan) M Imanishi	2	0^{r}
(Greece) D Papamichail	3	2
5	(Japan) A Okuno	6	6
3	(Japan) E Sema	6	6
WC	(Japan) K Sakata	1	3
Q	(Japan) A Omae	3	2
(Japan) K Okamura	6	6
Q	(Japan) M Minokoshi	6^{4}	4
(Australia) S Sanders	7^{7}	6
Q	(United States) Y Chiang	6	1	4
6	(Netherlands) I de Vroome	4	6	6

Second round
1	(Belgium) A-S Mestach	6	6
(Japan) M Miyamura	4	1
WC	(Japan) S Oshino	4	4
5	(Japan) A Okuno	6	6
3	(Japan) E Sema	2	1
(Japan) K Okamura	6	6
(Australia) S Sanders	2	1
6	(Netherlands) I de Vroome	6	6

Quarterfinals
1	(Belgium) A-S Mestach	7^{7}	6
5	(Japan) A Okuno	6^{3}	2
(Japan) K Okamura	4	6	7
6	(Netherlands) I de Vroome	6	3	5

Semifinals
1	(Belgium) A-S Mestach	5	5
(Japan) K Okamura	7	7

=== Bottom half ===
First round
8	(Russia) K Lykina	6	6
(Australia) O Tjandramulia	1	1
(Japan) A Inoue	2	1^{r}
(Japan) S Akita	6	1
(Hungary) D Gálfi	7	6
(United States) T Kinard	5	4
(Chinese Taipei) C-w Hsu	7^{7}	1	7^{11}
4	(China) S Xu	6^{2}	6	6^{9}
7	(Japan) M Ninomiya	6	4	6
Q	(Japan) M Ayukawa	2	6	4
(Japan) M Inoue	5	2
(United Kingdom) K Dunne	7	6
(Japan) J Namigata	5	1
WC	(Japan) K Hisami	7	6
(France) J Boualem	4	6^{4}
2	(Uzbekistan) N Abduraimova	6	7^{7}

Second round
8	(Russia) K Lykina	6	6
(Japan) S Akita	2	4
(Hungary) D Gálfi	6	6
(Chinese Taipei) C-w Hsu	4	3
7	(Japan) M Ninomiya	3	5
(United Kingdom) K Dunne	6	7
WC	(Japan) K Hisami	6	3	1
2	(Uzbekistan) N Abduraimova	4	6	6

Quarterfinals
8	(Russia) K Lykina	6	7^{7}
(Hungary) D Gálfi	4	6^{5}
(United Kingdom) K Dunne	4	3
2	(Uzbekistan) N Abduraimova	6	6

Semifinals
8	(Russia) K Lykina	1	3
2	(Uzbekistan) N Abduraimova	6	6
