= 2015 Kurume Best Amenity Cup – Doubles =

Doubles
- 2015 Kurume Best Amenity Cup

Final
- Champions: (Japan) Makoto Ninomiya (Japan) Riko Sawayanagi
- Runners-up: (Japan) Eri Hozumi (Japan) Junri Namigata
- Score: 7–6^{(12–10)}, 6–3

Events
Singles	Doubles
← 2014 ·	Kurume Best Amenity Cup	· 2016 →

Jarmila Gajdošová and Arina Rodionova were the defending champions, but both players chose to participate at the 2015 Internazionali BNL d'Italia.

Makoto Ninomiya and Riko Sawayanagi won the title, defeating Eri Hozumi and Junri Namigata in the final, 7–6^{(12–10)}, 6–3.

== Seeds ==
1. (Japan) Eri Hozumi / (Japan) Junri Namigata (final)
2. (Belgium) An-Sophie Mestach / (United Kingdom) Emily Webley-Smith (first round)
3. (Japan) Miki Miyamura / (Thailand) Varatchaya Wongteanchai (semifinals)
4. (Thailand) Nicha Lertpitaksinchai / (Thailand) Peangtarn Plipuech (first round)

== Draw ==
=== Key ===
- Q = Qualifier
- WC = Wild card
- LL = Lucky loser
- Alt = Alternate
- SE = Special exempt
- PR = Protected ranking
- ITF = ITF entry
- JE = Junior exempt
- w/o = Walkover
- r = Retired
- d = Defaulted
- SR = Special ranking

First round
1	(Japan) E Hozumi (Japan) J Namigata	7^{7}	6
(Japan) M Inoue (Japan) A Omae	6^{4}	1
(Japan) E Sema (Japan) Y Sema	4	6	[11]
WC	(Japan) R Fujiwara (Japan) A Inoue	6	4	[9]
4	(Thailand) N Lertpitaksinchai (Thailand) Pe Plipuech	3	4
(Japan) C Okadaue (Japan) Y Tanaka	6	6
Q	(Japan) K Hisami (Japan) K Takahata	2	6	[10]
Q	(Australia) A Bai (Japan) K Okamura	6	4	[7]
(South Korea) S-j Jang (Australia) A Myers	6	6
WC	(Japan) Y Koshino (Japan) A Yonemura	4	4
(Japan) N Hibino (Japan) M Kato	4	1
3	(Japan) M Miyamura (Thailand) Vara Wongteanchai	6	6
(Russia) A Morgina (Japan) A Okuno	6	7
WC	(Japan) Y Kawasaki (Japan) Y Nakano	4	5
(Japan) M Ninomiya (Japan) R Sawayanagi	7^{7}	6
2	(Belgium) A-S Mestach (United Kingdom) E Webley-Smith	6^{5}	0

Quarterfinals
1	(Japan) E Hozumi (Japan) J Namigata	7^{7}	6
(Japan) E Sema (Japan) Y Sema	6^{2}	4
(Japan) C Okadaue (Japan) Y Tanaka	3	3
Q	(Japan) K Hisami (Japan) K Takahata	6	6
(South Korea) S-j Jang (Australia) A Myers	4	6	[5]
3	(Japan) M Miyamura (Thailand) Vara Wongteanchai	6	3	[10]
(Russia) A Morgina (Japan) A Okuno	6^{7}	6	[1]
(Japan) M Ninomiya (Japan) R Sawayanagi	7^{9}	1	[10]

Semifinals
1	(Japan) E Hozumi (Japan) J Namigata	6	6
Q	(Japan) K Hisami (Japan) K Takahata	0	3
3	(Japan) M Miyamura (Thailand) Vara Wongteanchai	3	2
(Japan) M Ninomiya (Japan) R Sawayanagi	6	6

Final
1	(Japan) E Hozumi (Japan) J Namigata	6^{10}	3
(Japan) M Ninomiya (Japan) R Sawayanagi	7^{12}	6
