= 2013 Kurume Best Amenity Cup – Singles =

Singles
- 2013 Kurume Best Amenity Cup

Final
- Champion: (Tunisia) Ons Jabeur
- Runner-up: (Belgium) An-Sophie Mestach
- Score: 6–0, 6–2

Events
Singles	Doubles
← 2012 ·	Kurume Best Amenity Cup	· 2014 →

Zheng Saisai was the defending champion, but she lost to An-Sophie Mestach in the quarterfinals.

Ons Jabeur won the title, defeating Mestach in the final, 6–0, 6–2.

== Seeds ==
1. (China) Zheng Saisai (quarterfinals)
2. (Kazakhstan) Zarina Diyas (semifinals)
3. (Switzerland) Amra Sadiković (quarterfinals)
4. (Japan) Junri Namigata (semifinals)
5. (Croatia) Ana Savić (first round)
6. (Belgium) An-Sophie Mestach (final)
7. (Tunisia) Ons Jabeur (champion)
8. (Japan) Sachie Ishizu (quarterfinals)

== Main draw ==
=== Key ===
- Q = Qualifier
- WC = Wild card
- LL = Lucky loser
- Alt = Alternate
- SE = Special exempt
- PR = Protected ranking
- ITF = ITF entry
- JE = Junior exempt
- w/o = Walkover
- r = Retired
- d = Defaulted
- SR = Special ranking

=== Finals ===
Semifinals
6	(Belgium) An-Sophie Mestach	6	6^{7}	6
4	(Japan) Junri Namigata	4	7^{9}	4
7	(Tunisia) Ons Jabeur	6	3	7
2	(Kazakhstan) Zarina Diyas	4	6	5

Final
6	(Belgium) An-Sophie Mestach	0	2
7	(Tunisia) Ons Jabeur	6	6

=== Top half ===
First round
1	(China) S Zheng	7	6
(Japan) M Imanishi	5	3
Q	(Japan) Y Tanaka	1	7	6
(United States) C-y Hsu	6	5	1
(Japan) M Eguchi	6	6^{5}	1^{r}
Q	(Japan) M Miyamura	3	7^{7}	5
(Ukraine) T Arefyeva	3	0
6	(Belgium) A-S Mestach	6	6
4	(Japan) J Namigata	6	7^{7}
(Japan) A Omae	3	6^{2}
WC	(Japan) Y Nakano	4	6	0
Q	(Japan) Y Higuchi	6	4	6
(China) S Sun	3	6	7
(Japan) R Ozaki	6	4	5
(Australia) B Bobusic	5	1
8	(Japan) S Ishizu	7	6

Second round
1	(China) S Zheng	6	7^{7}
Q	(Japan) Y Tanaka	1	6^{5}
Q	(Japan) M Miyamura	7^{7}	2	1
6	(Belgium) A-S Mestach	6^{3}	6	6
4	(Japan) J Namigata	4	6	6
Q	(Japan) Y Higuchi	6	1	4
(China) S Sun	6^{7}	4
8	(Japan) S Ishizu	7^{9}	6

Quarterfinals
1	(China) S Zheng	4	1
6	(Belgium) A-S Mestach	6	6
4	(Japan) J Namigata	6	4	6
8	(Japan) S Ishizu	4	6	1

Semifinals
6	(Belgium) A-S Mestach	6	6^{7}	6
4	(Japan) J Namigata	4	7^{9}	4

=== Bottom half ===
First round
7	(Tunisia) O Jabeur	6	6
WC	(Japan) M Kato	0	3
WC	(Japan) A Yonemura	1	5
(Bosnia and Herzegovina) J Tinjić	6	7
(Australia) S Sanders	6	7^{7}
Q	(Japan) K Hisami	3	6^{3}
WC	(Japan) Y Miyazaki	1	0
3	(Switzerland) A Sadiković	6	6
5	(Croatia) A Savić	4	6	2
(Uzbekistan) N Abduraimova	6	4	6
(Japan) M Tanaka	6	6
(Japan) E Hozumi	4	1
(Japan) R Fujiwara	6	6
(Japan) C Okadaue	1	3
(Japan) M Ninomiya	1	2
2	(Kazakhstan) Z Diyas	6	6

Second round
7	(Tunisia) O Jabeur	1	6	6
(Bosnia and Herzegovina) J Tinjić	6	4	2
(Australia) S Sanders	6^{4}	3
3	(Switzerland) A Sadiković	7^{7}	6
(Uzbekistan) N Abduraimova	4	3
(Japan) M Tanaka	6	6
(Japan) R Fujiwara	7	6^{0}	0
2	(Kazakhstan) Z Diyas	5	7^{7}	6

Quarterfinals
7	(Tunisia) O Jabeur	7	6
3	(Switzerland) A Sadiković	5	1
(Japan) M Tanaka	2	1
2	(Kazakhstan) Z Diyas	6	6

Semifinals
7	(Tunisia) O Jabeur	6	3	7
2	(Kazakhstan) Z Diyas	4	6	5
