= 2013 Kurume Best Amenity Cup – Doubles =

Doubles
- 2013 Kurume Best Amenity Cup

Final
- Champions: (Japan) Kanae Hisami (Japan) Mari Tanaka
- Runners-up: (Japan) Rika Fujiwara (Japan) Akiko Omae
- Score: 6–4, 7–6^{(7–2)}

Events
Singles	Doubles
← 2012 ·	Kurume Best Amenity Cup	· 2014 →

Han Xinyun and Sun Shengnan were the defending champions, having won the event in 2012, but Han chose not to defend her title. Sun partnered up with Hsu Chieh-yu, but withdrew in the semifinals.

Kanae Hisami and Mari Tanaka won the title, defeating Rika Fujiwara and Akiko Omae in the final, 6–4, 7–6^{(7–2)}.

== Seeds ==
1. (United States) Hsu Chieh-yu / (China) Sun Shengnan (semifinals; withdrew)
2. (Japan) Rika Fujiwara / (Japan) Akiko Omae (final)
3. (Ukraine) Tetyana Arefyeva / (Switzerland) Amra Sadiković (withdrew)
4. (Japan) Eri Hozumi / (Japan) Makoto Ninomiya (quarterfinals)

== Draw ==
=== Key ===
- Q = Qualifier
- WC = Wild card
- LL = Lucky loser
- Alt = Alternate
- SE = Special exempt
- PR = Protected ranking
- ITF = ITF entry
- JE = Junior exempt
- w/o = Walkover
- r = Retired
- d = Defaulted
- SR = Special ranking

First round
1	(United States) C-y Hsu (China) S Sun	w/o
(Japan) M Eguchi (Japan) M Kato
(Chinese Taipei) S-y Hsieh (Japan) K Onishi	5	4
Q	(Japan) Y Koshino (Japan) Y Miyazaki	7	6
3	(Ukraine) T Arefyeva (Switzerland) A Sadiković
(Japan) K Hisami (Japan) M Tanaka	w/o
(Japan) S Ishizu (Japan) J Namigata	6	6
(Uzbekistan) N Abduraimova (Bosnia and Herzegovina) J Tinjić	2	4
WC	(Japan) N Hibino (Japan) R Ozaki	4	6	[6]
(Kazakhstan) Z Diyas (Japan) M Miyamura	6	3	[10]
WC	(Japan) Y Kawasaki (Japan) Y Nakano	0	4
4	(Japan) E Hozumi (Japan) M Ninomiya	6	6
(Japan) K Ito (Japan) A Yonemura	6^{6}	6	[10]
(Australia) B Bobusic (Australia) S Sanders	7^{8}	3	[5]
Q	(Japan) M Imanishi (Japan) Y Tanaka	2	3
2	(Japan) R Fujiwara (Japan) A Omae	6	6

Quarterfinals
1	(United States) C-y Hsu (China) S Sun	6	4	[10]
Q	(Japan) Y Koshino (Japan) Y Miyazaki	4	6	[7]
(Japan) K Hisami (Japan) M Tanaka	6	6
(Japan) S Ishizu (Japan) J Namigata	4	2
(Kazakhstan) Z Diyas (Japan) M Miyamura	6	5	[10]
4	(Japan) E Hozumi (Japan) M Ninomiya	2	7	[4]
(Japan) K Ito (Japan) A Yonemura	4	3
2	(Japan) R Fujiwara (Japan) A Omae	6	6

Semifinals
1	(United States) C-y Hsu (China) S Sun
(Japan) K Hisami (Japan) M Tanaka	w/o
(Kazakhstan) Z Diyas (Japan) M Miyamura	5	1
2	(Japan) R Fujiwara (Japan) A Omae	7	6

Final
(Japan) K Hisami (Japan) M Tanaka	6	7^{7}
2	(Japan) R Fujiwara (Japan) A Omae	4	6^{2}
