= 2016 Kurume Best Amenity Cup – Doubles =

Doubles
- 2016 Kurume Best Amenity Cup

Final
- Champion: (Chinese Taipei) Hsu Ching-wen (Russia) Ksenia Lykina
- Runner-up: (Hungary) Dalma Gálfi (China) Xu Shilin
- Score: 7–6^{(7–5)}, 6–2

Events
Singles	Doubles
← 2015 ·	Kurume Best Amenity Cup	· 2017 →

Makoto Ninomiya and Riko Sawayanagi were the defending champions, but Sawayanagi chose not to participate. Ninomiya partnered Robu Kajitani, but lost in the quarterfinals.

Hsu Ching-wen and Ksenia Lykina won the title, defeating Dalma Gálfi and Xu Shilin in the final, 7–6^{(7–5)}, 6–2.

== Seeds ==
1. (Belgium) An-Sophie Mestach / (Australia) Storm Sanders (first round)
2. (Japan) Kanae Hisami / (Japan) Kotomi Takahata (first round)
3. (Chinese Taipei) Hsu Ching-wen / (Russia) Ksenia Lykina (champions)
4. (Japan) Akiko Omae / (Japan) Erika Sema (quarterfinals)

== Draw ==
=== Key ===
- Q = Qualifier
- WC = Wild card
- LL = Lucky loser
- Alt = Alternate
- SE = Special exempt
- PR = Protected ranking
- ITF = ITF entry
- JE = Junior exempt
- w/o = Walkover
- r = Retired
- d = Defaulted
- SR = Special ranking

First round
1	(Belgium) A-S Mestach (Australia) S Sanders	4	4
(Hungary) D Gálfi (China) S Xu	6	6
(Japan) R Fujiwara (Japan) A Okuno	6	6
Q	(Australia) L Cabrera (Japan) A Yoshitomi	1	2
4	(Japan) A Omae (Japan) E Sema	6	6
WC	(Japan) N Fujioka (Japan) H Ogata	0	1
(Japan) M Miyamura (Japan) J Namigata	6	6
(United States) Y Chiang (Japan) Y Saigo	3	2
WC	(Japan) S Baba (Japan) R Hasegawa	0	3
Q	(Japan) R Kajitani (Japan) M Ninomiya	6	6
WC	(Japan) A Sonoda (Japan) R Takahashi	1	2
3	(Chinese Taipei) C-w Hsu (Russia) K Lykina	6	6
(Japan) M Ayukawa (Japan) Y Tanaka	0	2
(United Kingdom) K Dunne (Greece) D Papamichail	6	6
(Netherlands) I de Vroome (Japan) M Inoue	6	7
2	(Japan) K Hisami (Japan) K Takahata	3	5

Quarterfinals
(Hungary) D Gálfi (China) S Xu	4	6	[10]
(Japan) R Fujiwara (Japan) A Okuno	6	2	[7]
4	(Japan) A Omae (Japan) E Sema	6	3	[1]
(Japan) M Miyamura (Japan) J Namigata	1	6	[10]
Q	(Japan) R Kajitani (Japan) M Ninomiya	1	5
3	(Chinese Taipei) C-w Hsu (Russia) K Lykina	6	7
(United Kingdom) K Dunne (Greece) D Papamichail	5	2
(Netherlands) I de Vroome (Japan) M Inoue	7	6

Semifinals
(Hungary) D Gálfi (China) S Xu	1	6	[10]
(Japan) M Miyamura (Japan) J Namigata	6	3	[6]
3	(Chinese Taipei) C-w Hsu (Russia) K Lykina	6	7
(Netherlands) I de Vroome (Japan) M Inoue	2	5

Final
(Hungary) D Gálfi (China) S Xu	6^{5}	2
3	(Chinese Taipei) C-w Hsu (Russia) K Lykina	7^{7}	6
