= 2017 Kurume U.S.E Cup – Singles =

Singles
- 2017 Kurume U.S.E Cup

Final
- Champion: (United Kingdom) Laura Robson
- Runner-up: (United Kingdom) Katie Boulter
- Score: 6–3, 6–4

Events
Singles	Doubles
← 2016 ·	Kurume Cup	· 2018 →

Kyōka Okamura was the defending champion, but lost in the second round to Miharu Imanishi.

Laura Robson won the title, defeating Katie Boulter in an all-British final, 6–3, 6–4.

== Seeds ==
1. (Russia) Ksenia Lykina (quarterfinals)
2. (Japan) Riko Sawayanagi (quarterfinals)
3. (Japan) Shiho Akita (first round)
4. (United Kingdom) Laura Robson (champion)
5. (Japan) Junri Namigata (quarterfinals; retired)
6. (Japan) Kyōka Okamura (second round)
7. (Japan) Hiroko Kuwata (first round)
8. (United Kingdom) Katy Dunne (second round)

== Draw ==
=== Key ===
- Q = Qualifier
- WC = Wild card
- LL = Lucky loser
- Alt = Alternate
- SE = Special exempt
- PR = Protected ranking
- ITF = ITF entry
- JE = Junior exempt
- w/o = Walkover
- r = Retired
- d = Defaulted
- SR = Special ranking

=== Finals ===
Semifinals
(United Kingdom) Katie Boulter	4	6	6
(Japan) Ayano Shimizu	6	3	4
4	(United Kingdom) Laura Robson	7	7^{7}
Q	(Japan) Erina Hayashi	5	6^{2}

Final
(United Kingdom) Katie Boulter	3	4
4	(United Kingdom) Laura Robson	6	6

=== Top half ===
First round
1	(Russia) K Lykina	6	6
(Japan) M Ayukawa	1	2
(Japan) M Ozeki	3	3
(Japan) R Ushijima	6	6
(United Kingdom) K Boulter	6	6
WC	(Japan) H Ogata	2	4
(Japan) Y Tanaka	5	1
8	(United Kingdom) K Dunne	7	6
3	(Japan) S Akita	7	6^{3}	3
(Japan) A Shimizu	5	7^{7}	6
(Japan) H Arakawa	6	0	2
Q	(Japan) N Hanatani	4	6	6
Q	(Japan) A Miyamoto	6	6
WC	(Japan) S Oshino	0	0
(Australia) T Patterson	4	3
5	(Japan) J Namigata	6	6

Second round
1	(Russia) K Lykina	6	6
(Japan) R Ushijima	2	4
(United Kingdom) K Boulter	5	6	6
8	(United Kingdom) K Dunne	7	3	1
(Japan) A Shimizu	6	6
Q	(Japan) N Hanatani	2	1
Q	(Japan) A Miyamoto	2	3
5	(Japan) J Namigata	6	6

Quarterfinals
1	(Russia) K Lykina	6	2	4
(United Kingdom) K Boulter	1	6	6
(Japan) A Shimizu	6	0
5	(Japan) J Namigata	2	0^{r}

Semifinals
(United Kingdom) K Boulter	4	6	6
(Japan) A Shimizu	6	3	4

=== Bottom half ===
First round
6	(Japan) K Okamura	6	6
PR	(Australia) K Birrell	4	1
(France) J Boualem	6	0	3
(Japan) M Imanishi	2	6	6
(Japan) M Minokoshi	2	5
Q	(Japan) R Fujiwara	6	7
(Japan) M Kobori	3	5
4	(United Kingdom) L Robson	6	7
7	(Japan) H Kuwata	6	4	1
WC	(Japan) S Baba	2	6	6
(Japan) A Okuno	6^{2}	0
Q	(Japan) E Hayashi	7^{7}	6
(Japan) E Sema	2	7	1
(Australia) O Tjandramulia	6	5	6
WC	(Japan) M Miyahara	3	3
2	(Japan) R Sawayanagi	6	6

Second round
6	(Japan) K Okamura	3	2
(Japan) M Imanishi	6	6
Q	(Japan) R Fujiwara	1	3
4	(United Kingdom) L Robson	6	6
WC	(Japan) S Baba	6	4	4
Q	(Japan) E Hayashi	2	6	6
(Australia) O Tjandramulia	6	0	3
2	(Japan) R Sawayanagi	4	6	6

Quarterfinals
(Japan) M Imanishi	6	0	5
4	(United Kingdom) L Robson	4	6	7
Q	(Japan) E Hayashi	6	1	6
2	(Japan) R Sawayanagi	1	6	3

Semifinals
4	(United Kingdom) L Robson	7	7^{7}
Q	(Japan) E Hayashi	5	6^{2}
