= 2016 Kurume Best Amenity Cup =

- Date: 16–22 May
- Edition: 12th
- Category: ITF Women's Circuit
- Prize money: $50,000
- Surface: Grass
- Location: Kurume, Japan

Champions

Singles
- (Japan) Kyōka Okamura

Doubles
- (Chinese Taipei) Hsu Ching-wen / (Russia) Ksenia Lykina
← 2015 ·	Kurume Best Amenity Cup	· 2017 →

The 2016 Kurume Best Amenity Cup was a professional tennis tournament played on outdoor grass courts. It was the twelfth edition of the tournament and part of the 2016 ITF Women's Circuit, offering a total of $50,000 in prize money. It took place in Kurume, Japan, on 16–22 May 2016.

== Singles main draw entrants ==
=== Seeds ===
Country	Player	Rank^{1}	Seed
BEL	An-Sophie Mestach	168	1
UZB	Nigina Abduraimova	221	2
JPN	Erika Sema	254	3
CHN	Xu Shilin	259	4
JPN	Ayaka Okuno	269	5
NED	Indy de Vroome	305	6
JPN	Makoto Ninomiya	312	7
RUS	Ksenia Lykina	315	8

- ^{1} Rankings as of 9 May 2016.

=== Other entrants ===
The following players received wildcards into the singles main draw:

- (Japan) Sari Baba
- (Japan) Kanae Hisami
- (Japan) Suzuho Oshino
- (Japan) Kimika Sakata

The following players received entry from the qualifying draw:

- (Japan) Mana Ayukawa
- (United States) Yuki Chiang
- (Japan) Mai Minokoshi
- (Japan) Akiko Omae

== Champions ==
=== Singles ===
- (Japan) Kyōka Okamura def. (Uzbekistan) Nigina Abduraimova, 7–6^{(12–10)}, 1–6, 7–5

=== Doubles ===
- (Chinese Taipei) Hsu Ching-wen / (Russia) Ksenia Lykina def. (Hungary) Dalma Gálfi / (China) Xu Shilin, 7–6^{(7–5)}, 6–2
