= 2015 Kurume Best Amenity Cup – Singles =

Singles
- 2015 Kurume Best Amenity Cup

Final
- Champion: (Japan) Nao Hibino
- Runner-up: (Japan) Eri Hozumi
- Score: 6–3, 6–1

Events
| Singles | Doubles |
| ← 2014 · | Kurume Best Amenity Cup | · 2016 → |

Wang Qiang was the defending champion, but chose not to participate.

Nao Hibino won the title, defeating Eri Hozumi in an all-Japanese final, 6–3, 6–1.

== Seeds ==
1. (Belgium) An-Sophie Mestach (quarterfinals)
2. (Czech Republic) Kristýna Plíšková (semifinals)
3. (Japan) Eri Hozumi (final)
4. (Japan) Junri Namigata (first round)
5. (United Kingdom) Naomi Broady (second round)
6. (Russia) Ekaterina Bychkova (semifinals)
7. (Japan) Nao Hibino (champion)
8. (Japan) Miharu Imanishi (quarterfinals)

== Main draw ==
=== Key ===
- Q = Qualifier
- WC = Wild card
- LL = Lucky loser
- Alt = Alternate
- SE = Special exempt
- PR = Protected ranking
- ITF = ITF entry
- JE = Junior exempt
- w/o = Walkover
- r = Retired
- d = Defaulted
- SR = Special ranking

=== Finals ===
Semifinals
7 | (Japan) Nao Hibino | 1 | 6 | 7
6 | (Russia) Ekaterina Bychkova | 6 | 4 | 5
3 | (Japan) Eri Hozumi | 7^{7} | 6
2 | (Czech Republic) Kristýna Plíšková | 6^{5} | 3

Final
7 | (Japan) Nao Hibino | 6 | 6
3 | (Japan) Eri Hozumi | 3 | 1

=== Top half ===
First round
1 | (Belgium) A-S Mestach | 6 | 6
(United Kingdom) K Dunne | 3 | 4
WC | (Japan) K Okamura | 6 | 6
WC | (Japan) A Yonemura | 0 | 1
(Australia) A Bai | 6 | 0 | 7^{7}
(Japan) E Sema | 4 | 6 | 6^{3}
(Japan) R Sawayanagi | 3 | 2
7 | (Japan) N Hibino | 6 | 6
4 | (Japan) J Namigata | 6 | 1 | 3
(Russia) A Morgina | 3 | 6 | 6
Q | (Japan) M Ninomiya | 6 | 4 | 3
(South Korea) S-j Jang | 2 | 6 | 6
(Bulgaria) A Naydenova | 3 | 6 | 6
(United Kingdom) H Dart | 6 | 3 | 3
(Netherlands) I de Vroome | 4 | 5
6 | (Russia) E Bychkova | 6 | 7

Second round
1 | (Belgium) A-S Mestach | 6 | 6
WC | (Japan) K Okamura | 3 | 2
(Australia) A Bai | 3 | 5
7 | (Japan) N Hibino | 6 | 7
(Russia) A Morgina | 4 | 0
(South Korea) S-j Jang | 6 | 6
(Bulgaria) A Naydenova | 2 | 4
6 | (Russia) E Bychkova | 6 | 6

Quarterfinals
1 | (Belgium) A-S Mestach | 2 | 2
7 | (Japan) N Hibino | 6 | 6
(South Korea) S-j Jang | 6 | 3 | 3
6 | (Russia) E Bychkova | 3 | 6 | 6

Semifinals
7 | (Japan) N Hibino | 1 | 6 | 7
6 | (Russia) E Bychkova | 6 | 4 | 5

=== Bottom half ===
First round
5 | (United Kingdom) N Broady | 5 | 6 | 6
(Sweden) S Celik | 7 | 2 | 3
Q | (Japan) C Okadaue | 7^{7} | 3 | 4
(Japan) M Inoue | 6^{3} | 6 | 6
Q | (Ukraine) M Zakarlyuk | 6 | 6
WC | (Japan) M Minokoshi | 3 | 2
(United Kingdom) E Webley-Smith | 6^{11} | 3
3 | (Japan) E Hozumi | 7^{13} | 6
8 | (Japan) M Imanishi | 6 | 2 | 6
Q | (Japan) M Kato | 1 | 6 | 2
WC | (Japan) A Inoue | 4 | 1
(Japan) M Hibi | 6 | 6
(Thailand) V Wongteanchai | 5 | 2
(Slovenia) D Jakupović | 7 | 6
(Japan) A Okuno | 4 | 3
2 | (Czech Republic) Kr Plíšková | 6 | 6

Second round
5 | (United Kingdom) N Broady | 2 | 6 | 3
(Japan) M Inoue | 6 | 3 | 6
Q | (Ukraine) M Zakarlyuk | 6^{3} | 5
3 | (Japan) E Hozumi | 7^{7} | 7
8 | (Japan) M Imanishi | 7 | 6
(Japan) M Hibi | 5 | 2
(Slovenia) D Jakupović | 2 | 1
2 | (Czech Republic) Kr Plíšková | 6 | 6

Quarterfinals
(Japan) M Inoue | 5 | 1
3 | (Japan) E Hozumi | 7 | 6
8 | (Japan) M Imanishi | 0 | 1
2 | (Czech Republic) Kr Plíšková | 6 | 6

Semifinals
3 | (Japan) E Hozumi | 7^{7} | 6
2 | (Czech Republic) Kr Plíšková | 6^{5} | 3
