= 2014 Kurume Best Amenity Cup – Doubles =

Doubles
- 2014 Kurume Best Amenity Cup

Final
- Champions: (Australia) Jarmila Gajdošová (Australia) Arina Rodionova
- Runners-up: (Japan) Junri Namigata (Japan) Akiko Yonemura
- Score: 6–4, 6–2

Events
Singles	Doubles
← 2013 ·	Kurume Best Amenity Cup	· 2015 →

Kanae Hisami and Mari Tanaka were the defending champions, having won the event in 2013, however both players chose to participate with different partners. Hisami partnered with Sachie Ishizu, but the team withdrew before their first round was played, whilst Tanaka partnered Makoto Ninomiya, but lost in the first round.

Jarmila Gajdošová and Arina Rodionova won the title, defeating Junri Namigata and Akiko Yonemura in the final, 6–4, 6–2.

== Seeds ==
1. (Australia) Jarmila Gajdošová / (Australia) Arina Rodionova (champions)
2. (United Kingdom) Jocelyn Rae / (United Kingdom) Anna Smith (quarterfinals)
3. (Japan) Makoto Ninomiya / (Japan) Mari Tanaka (first round)
4. (Australia) Jessica Moore / (Bulgaria) Aleksandrina Naydenova (first round)

== Draw ==
=== Key ===
- Q = Qualifier
- WC = Wild card
- LL = Lucky loser
- Alt = Alternate
- SE = Special exempt
- PR = Protected ranking
- ITF = ITF entry
- JE = Junior exempt
- w/o = Walkover
- r = Retired
- d = Defaulted
- SR = Special ranking

First round
1	(Australia) J Gajdošová (Australia) Ar Rodionova	6	6
(Japan) M Kato (Japan) R Sawayanagi	4	4
WC	(Japan) S Hisamitsu (Japan) Y Yasuda	3	5
(United Kingdom) S Murray (India) A Raina	6	7
3	(Japan) M Ninomiya (Japan) M Tanaka	6^{4}	2
(Japan) A Inoue (Japan) M Miyamura	7^{7}	6
(Belgium) Y Bonaventure (Russia) E Yashina	6	6
WC	(Japan) Y Kawasaki (Japan) Y Nakano	3	3
LL	(Japan) M Inoue (Japan) H Kuwata	6	5	[10]
(United Kingdom) T Moore (Australia) T Patterson	1	7	[7]
(South Korea) S-j Jang (Poland) J Jegiołka	6	6
4	(Australia) J Moore (Bulgaria) A Naydenova	0	1
WC	(Japan) Y Koshino (Japan) Y Miyazaki	4	2
Q	(Japan) J Namigata (Japan) A Yonemura	6	6
Q	(Montenegro) A Veselinović (United Kingdom) E Webley-Smith	6	1	[9]
2	(United Kingdom) J Rae (United Kingdom) A Smith	4	6	[11]

Quarterfinals
1	(Australia) J Gajdošová (Australia) Ar Rodionova	6	6
(United Kingdom) S Murray (India) A Raina	4	3
(Japan) A Inoue (Japan) M Miyamura	6	6
(Belgium) Y Bonaventure (Russia) E Yashina	4	3
LL	(Japan) M Inoue (Japan) H Kuwata	6	6
(South Korea) S-j Jang (Poland) J Jegiołka	0	2
Q	(Japan) J Namigata (Japan) A Yonemura	3	7^{8}	[10]
2	(United Kingdom) J Rae (United Kingdom) A Smith	6	6^{6}	[6]

Semifinals
1	(Australia) J Gajdošová (Australia) Ar Rodionova	7^{7}	6
(Japan) A Inoue (Japan) M Miyamura	6^{3}	0
LL	(Japan) M Inoue (Japan) H Kuwata	3	3
Q	(Japan) J Namigata (Japan) A Yonemura	6	6

Final
1	(Australia) J Gajdošová (Australia) Ar Rodionova	6	6
Q	(Japan) J Namigata (Japan) A Yonemura	4	2
