= 2013 Kurume Best Amenity Cup =

- Date: 13–19 May
- Edition: 9th
- Location: Kurume, Japan

Champions

Singles
- (Tunisia) Ons Jabeur

Doubles
- (Japan) Kanae Hisami / (Japan) Mari Tanaka
← 2012 ·	Kurume Best Amenity Cup	· 2014 →

The 2013 Kurume Best Amenity Cup was a professional tennis tournament played on outdoor grass courts. It was the ninth edition of the tournament which was part of the 2013 ITF Women's Circuit, offering a total of $50,000 in prize money. It took place in Kurume, Japan, on 13–19 May 2013.

== WTA entrants ==
=== Seeds ===
Country	Player	Rank^{1}	Seed
CHN	Zheng Saisai	155	1
KAZ	Zarina Diyas	205	2
SUI	Amra Sadiković	233	3
JPN	Junri Namigata	236	4
CRO	Ana Savić	244	5
BEL	An-Sophie Mestach	248	6
TUN	Ons Jabeur	255	7
JPN	Sachie Ishizu	257	8

- ^{1} Rankings as of 6 May 2013

=== Other entrants ===
The following players received wildcards into the singles main draw:

- (Japan) Miyu Kato
- (Japan) Yumi Miyazaki
- (Japan) Yumi Nakano
- (Japan) Akiko Yonemura

The following players received entry from the qualifying draw:

- (Japan) Yuka Higuchi
- (Japan) Kanae Hisami
- (Japan) Miki Miyamura
- (Japan) Yuuki Tanaka

== Champions ==
=== Singles ===
- (Tunisia) Ons Jabeur def. (Belgium) An-Sophie Mestach 6–0, 6–2

=== Doubles ===
- (Japan) Kanae Hisami / (Japan) Mari Tanaka def. (Japan) Rika Fujiwara / (Japan) Akiko Omae 6–4, 7–6^{(7–2)}
