= 2014 Kurume Best Amenity Cup =

- Date: 12–18 May
- Edition: 10th
- Category: ITF Women's Circuit
- Prize money: $50,000
- Surface: Grass
- Location: Kurume, Fukuoka, Japan

Champions

Singles
- (China) Wang Qiang

Doubles
- (Australia) Jarmila Gajdošová / (Australia) Arina Rodionova
← 2013 ·	Kurume Best Amenity Cup	· 2015 →

The 2014 Kurume Best Amenity Cup is a professional tennis tournament played on outdoor grass courts. It is the tenth edition of the tournament and part of the 2014 ITF Women's Circuit, offering a total of $50,000 in prize money. It takes place in Kurume, Fukuoka, Japan, on 12–18 May 2014.

== Singles main draw entrants ==
=== Seeds ===
Country	Player	Rank^{1}	Seed
JPN	Eri Hozumi	167	1
GBR	Naomi Broady	194	2
JPN	Sachie Ishizu	202	3
GBR	Samantha Murray	227	4
JPN	Miharu Imanishi	229	5
JPN	Hiroko Kuwata	247	6
AUS	Arina Rodionova	248	7
GBR	Tara Moore	252	8

- ^{1} Rankings as of 5 May 2014

=== Other entrants ===
The following players received wildcards into the singles main draw:

- (Japan) Miyu Kato
- (Japan) Yumi Miyazaki
- (Japan) Yumi Nakano
- (Japan) Chihiro Nunome

The following players received entry from the qualifying draw:

- (United States) Tori Kinard
- (Japan) Mai Minokoshi
- (Japan) Chiaki Okadaue
- (Thailand) Tamarine Tanasugarn

== Champions ==
=== Singles ===
- (China) Wang Qiang def. (Japan) Eri Hozumi, 6–3, 6–1

=== Doubles ===
- (Australia) Jarmila Gajdošová / (Australia) Arina Rodionova def. (Japan) Junri Namigata / (Japan) Akiko Yonemura, 6–4, 6–2
