= 2015 Kurume Best Amenity Cup =

- Date: 11–17 May
- Edition: 11th
- Category: ITF Women's Circuit
- Prize money: $50,000
- Surface: Grass
- Location: Kurume, Japan

Champions

Singles
- (Japan) Nao Hibino

Doubles
- (Japan) Makoto Ninomiya / (Japan) Riko Sawayanagi
← 2014 ·	Kurume Best Amenity Cup	· 2016 →

The 2015 Kurume Best Amenity Cup was a professional tennis tournament played on outdoor grass courts. It was the eleventh edition of the tournament and part of the 2015 ITF Women's Circuit, offering a total of $50,000 in prize money. It took place in Kurume, Fukuoka, Japan, on 11–17 May 2015.

== Singles main draw entrants ==
=== Seeds ===
Country	Player	Rank^{1}	Seed
BEL	An-Sophie Mestach	115	1
CZE	Kristýna Plíšková	121	2
JPN	Eri Hozumi	157	3
JPN	Junri Namigata	177	4
GBR	Naomi Broady	186	5
RUS	Ekaterina Bychkova	200	6
JPN	Nao Hibino	210	7
JPN	Miharu Imanishi	214	8

- ^{1} Rankings as of 4 May 2015

=== Other entrants ===
The following players received wildcards into the singles main draw:

- (Japan) Akari Inoue
- (Japan) Mai Minokoshi
- (Japan) Ayumi Morita
- (Japan) Akiko Yonemura

The following players received entry from the qualifying draw:

- (Japan) Miyu Kato
- (Japan) Makoto Ninomiya
- (Japan) Chiaki Okadaue
- (Ukraine) Marianna Zakarlyuk

== Champions ==
=== Singles ===
- (Japan) Nao Hibino def. (Japan) Eri Hozumi, 6–3, 6–1

=== Doubles ===
- (Japan) Makoto Ninomiya / (Japan) Riko Sawayanagi def. (Japan) Eri Hozumi / (Japan) Junri Namigata, 7–6^{(12–10)}, 6–3
