= 2014 Kurume Best Amenity Cup – Singles =

Singles
- 2014 Kurume Best Amenity Cup

Final
- Champion: (China) Wang Qiang
- Runner-up: (Japan) Eri Hozumi
- Score: 6–3, 6–1

Events
Singles	Doubles
← 2013 ·	Kurume Best Amenity Cup	· 2015 →

Ons Jabeur was the defending champion, having won the event in 2013, but chose not to participate.

Wang Qiang won the title, defeating Eri Hozumi in the final, 6–3, 6–1.

== Seeds ==
1. (Japan) Eri Hozumi (final)
2. (United Kingdom) Naomi Broady (second round)
3. (Japan) ~~Sachie Ishizu~~ (withdrew)
4. (United Kingdom) Samantha Murray (second round)
5. (Japan) Miharu Imanishi (quarterfinals)
6. (Japan) Hiroko Kuwata (second round)
7. (Australia) Arina Rodionova (semifinals)
8. (United Kingdom) Tara Moore (second round)

== Main draw ==
=== Key ===
- Q = Qualifier
- WC = Wild card
- LL = Lucky loser
- Alt = Alternate
- SE = Special exempt
- PR = Protected ranking
- ITF = ITF entry
- JE = Junior exempt
- w/o = Walkover
- r = Retired
- d = Defaulted
- SR = Special ranking

=== Finals ===
Semifinals
1	(Japan) Eri Hozumi	6	7^{7}
7	(Australia) Arina Rodionova	0	6^{5}
(Japan) Nao Hibino	5	2
(China) Wang Qiang	7	6

Final
1	(Japan) Eri Hozumi	3	1
(China) Wang Qiang	6	6

=== Top half ===
First round
1	(Japan) E Hozumi	6	6
(Japan) R Fujiwara	2	3
(Greece) E Daniilidou	6	1	6
(Japan) S Aoyama	2	6	2
(Japan) J Namigata	2	7	2
(South Korea) S-j Jang	6	5	6
WC	(Japan) M Kato	4	2
5	(Japan) M Imanishi	6	6
4	(United Kingdom) S Murray	6	6
WC	(Japan) Y Nakano	2	2
(Japan) M Tanaka	6	3	6
WC	(Japan) Y Miyazaki	2	6	3
Q	(Japan) C Okadaue	5	6	7^{7}
Q	(United States) T Kinard	7	2	6^{4}
Q	(Japan) M Minokoshi	4	6	0
7	(Australia) Ar Rodionova	6	4	6

Second round
1	(Japan) E Hozumi	3	6	6
(Greece) E Daniilidou	6	1	4
(South Korea) S-j Jang	4	2
5	(Japan) M Imanishi	6	6
4	(United Kingdom) S Murray	2	1
(Japan) M Tanaka	6	6
Q	(Japan) C Okadaue	6^{3}	2
7	(Australia) Ar Rodionova	7^{7}	6

Quarterfinals
1	(Japan) E Hozumi	6	7
5	(Japan) M Imanishi	1	5
(Japan) M Tanaka	5	4
7	(Australia) Ar Rodionova	7	6

Semifinals
1	(Japan) E Hozumi	6	7^{7}
7	(Australia) Ar Rodionova	0	6^{5}

=== Bottom half ===
First round
6	(Japan) H Kuwata	6	6
(Japan) M Inoue	3	3
(Belgium) Y Bonaventure	4	6	2
(Japan) N Hibino	6	3	6
(Japan) M Miyamura	3	2
(Japan) N Osaka	6	6
WC	(Japan) C Nunome	6	4	3
LL	(Montenegro) A Veselinović	2	6	6
8	(United Kingdom) T Moore	6	4	7
(Poland) J Jegiołka	3	6	5
(Australia) J Gajdošová	6	6
(Australia) T Patterson	3	2
(China) Q Wang	6	4	7
(India) A Raina	2	6	5
Q	(Thailand) T Tanasugarn	0	1
2	(United Kingdom) N Broady	6	6

Second round
6	(Japan) H Kuwata	1	1
(Japan) N Hibino	6	6
(Japan) N Osaka	7^{7}	0	6
LL	(Montenegro) A Veselinović	6^{3}	6	2
8	(United Kingdom) T Moore	4	3
(Australia) J Gajdošová	6	6
(China) Q Wang	6	6
2	(United Kingdom) N Broady	4	2

Quarterfinals
(Japan) N Hibino	6	6
(Japan) N Osaka	1	0
(Australia) J Gajdošová	3	7	4
(China) Q Wang	6	5	6

Semifinals
(Japan) N Hibino	5	2
(China) Q Wang	7	6
