= 2017 Kurume U.S.E Cup – Doubles =

Doubles
- 2017 Kurume U.S.E Cup

Final
- Champion: (United Kingdom) Katy Dunne (Australia) Tammi Patterson
- Runner-up: (Japan) Erina Hayashi (Japan) Robu Kajitani
- Score: 6–7^{(3–7)}, 6–2, [10–4]

Events
Singles	Doubles
← 2016 ·	Kurume Cup	· 2018 →

Hsu Ching-wen and Ksenia Lykina were the defending champions, but both players chose not to participate.

Katy Dunne and Tammi Patterson won the title after defeating Erina Hayashi and Robu Kajitani 6–7^{(3–7)}, 6–2, [10–4] in the final.

== Seeds ==
1. (Japan) Rika Fujiwara / (Japan) Ayaka Okuno (semifinals)
2. (Japan) Junri Namigata / (Japan) Kotomi Takahata (quarterfinals)
3. (Japan) Miharu Imanishi / (Japan) Erika Sema (semifinals)
4. (United Kingdom) Katy Dunne / (Australia) Tammi Patterson (champions)

== Draw ==
=== Key ===
- Q = Qualifier
- WC = Wild card
- LL = Lucky loser
- Alt = Alternate
- SE = Special exempt
- PR = Protected ranking
- ITF = ITF entry
- JE = Junior exempt
- w/o = Walkover
- r = Retired
- d = Defaulted
- SR = Special ranking

First round
1	(Japan) R Fujiwara (Japan) A Okuno	6	6
(Japan) M Minokoshi (Japan) A Shimizu	2	4
(Japan) M Kobori (Japan) Y Saigo	6^{5}	3
Q	(Japan) H Arakawa (Japan) M Nishimoto	7^{7}	6
4	(United Kingdom) K Dunne (Australia) T Patterson	6	6
WC	(Japan) S Baba (Japan) H Ogata	3	0
(Japan) N Hanatani (Japan) M Ozeki	6	7^{7}
WC	(Japan) M Matsuda (Japan) R Takahashi	1	6^{5}
(Japan) M Ayukawa (Japan) K Okamura	6	6
(Japan) Y Tanaka (Japan) A Yoshitomi	3	0
(Australia) K Birrell (Australia) O Tjandramulia	2	6	[4]
3	(Japan) M Imanishi (Japan) E Sema	6	3	[10]
(Japan) E Hayashi (Japan) R Kajitani	6	6
WC	(Japan) M Miyahara (Japan) S Oshino	2	3
Q	(Japan) K Kato (Japan) M Uchijima	0	6^{3}
2	(Japan) J Namigata (Japan) K Takahata	6	7^{7}

Quarterfinals
1	(Japan) R Fujiwara (Japan) A Okuno	6	6
Q	(Japan) H Arakawa (Japan) M Nishimoto	3	2
4	(United Kingdom) K Dunne (Australia) T Patterson	6	6
(Japan) N Hanatani (Japan) M Ozeki	1	2
(Japan) M Ayukawa (Japan) K Okamura	5	4
3	(Japan) M Imanishi (Japan) E Sema	7	6
(Japan) E Hayashi (Japan) R Kajitani	6	7^{7}
2	(Japan) J Namigata (Japan) K Takahata	2	6^{1}

Semifinals
1	(Japan) R Fujiwara (Japan) A Okuno	6	2	[6]
4	(United Kingdom) K Dunne (Australia) T Patterson	3	6	[10]
3	(Japan) M Imanishi (Japan) E Sema	4	6	[8]
(Japan) E Hayashi (Japan) R Kajitani	6	1	[10]

Final
4	(United Kingdom) K Dunne (Australia) T Patterson	6^{3}	6	[10]
(Japan) E Hayashi (Japan) R Kajitani	7^{7}	2	[4]
