= 2017 Kurume U.S.E Cup =

- Date: 15–21 May
- Edition: 13th
- Category: ITF Women's Circuit
- Prize money: $60,000
- Surface: Carpet
- Location: Kurume, Japan

Champions

Singles
- (United Kingdom) Laura Robson

Doubles
- (United Kingdom) Katy Dunne / (Australia) Tammi Patterson
← 2016 ·	Kurume Cup	· 2018 →

The 2017 Kurume U.S.E Cup was a professional tennis tournament played on outdoor carpet courts. It was the thirteenth edition of the tournament and part of the 2017 ITF Women's Circuit, offering a total of $60,000 in prize money. It took place in Kurume, Japan, from 15–21 May 2017.

== Point distribution ==
Event	W	F	SF	QF	Round of 16	Round of 32	Q	Q2	Q3
Singles	80	48	29	15	8	1	5	3	1
Doubles	80	48	29	15	1	—	—	—	—

== Singles main draw entrants ==
=== Seeds ===
Country	Player	Rank^{1}	Seed
RUS	Ksenia Lykina	185	1
JPN	Riko Sawayanagi	217	2
JPN	Shiho Akita	221	3
GBR	Laura Robson	225	4
JPN	Junri Namigata	243	5
JPN	Kyōka Okamura	252	6
JPN	Hiroko Kuwata	260	7
GBR	Katy Dunne	291	8

- ^{1} Rankings as of 8 May 2017

=== Other entrants ===
The following players received wildcards into the singles main draw:

- (Japan) Sari Baba
- (Japan) Mihoki Miyahara
- (Japan) Haine Ogata
- (Japan) Suzuho Oshino

The following players received entry into the singles main draw by a protected ranking:

- (Australia) Kimberly Birrell

The following players received entry from the qualifying draw:

- (Japan) Rika Fujiwara
- (Japan) Erina Hayashi
- (Japan) Ayumi Miyamoto
- (Japan) Nagi Hanatani

== Champions ==
=== Singles ===
- (United Kingdom) Laura Robson def. (United Kingdom) Katie Boulter, 6–3, 6–4

=== Doubles ===
- (United Kingdom) Katy Dunne / (Australia) Tammi Patterson def. (Japan) Erina Hayashi / (Japan) Robu Kajitani, 6–7^{(3–7)}, 6–2, [10–4]
