= Shiho Akita =

Japanese tennis player (born 1990)

Shiho Akita 秋田 史帆
- Country (sports): Japan
- Born: 18 January 1990 (age 36) Aichi Prefecture, Japan
- Height: 1.55 m (5 ft 1 in)
- Turned pro: 2007
- Retired: 2026
- Plays: Right (two-handed backhand)
- Prize money: $176,449

Singles
- Career record: 426–314
- Career titles: 7 ITF
- Highest ranking: No. 221 (8 May 2017)

Doubles
- Career record: 99–117
- Career titles: 4 ITF
- Highest ranking: No. 369 (12 September 2016)

Shiho Akita (秋田 史帆, Akita Shiho; born 18 January 1990) is a Japanese former professional tennis player.

Akita has career-high WTA rankings of 221 in singles and 369 in doubles. She has won seven singles and four doubles titles on the ITF Women's Circuit.

In 2012, she made her main-draw debut on the WTA Tour in the doubles event of Pattaya Open, partnering with Nicole Rottmann. The pair reached the quarterfinals, losing to second seeds Eleni Daniilidou and Tamarine Tanasugarn.

Akita announced her retirement in March 2026.

== ITF Circuit finals ==
=== Singles: 18 (7 titles, 11 runner-ups) ===
Legend W25/35 tournaments W10/15 tournaments	Finals by surface Hard (5–9) Carpet (2–2)

Result	W–L	Date	Tournament	Tier	Surface	Opponent	Score
Loss	0–1	Jun 2008	ITF Tokyo, Japan	10k	Hard	(Japan) Kimiko Date-Krumm	3–6, 2–6
Loss	0–2	Jul 2009	ITF Miyazaki, Japan	10k	Carpet	(Japan) Junri Namigata	6–7^{(6)}, 2–6
Win	1–2	Aug 2009	ITF Niigata, Japan	10k	Carpet	(Japan) Remi Tezuka	6–4, 6–4
Loss	1–3	Aug 2009	ITF Saitama, Japan	10k	Hard	(Japan) Sachie Ishizu	3–6, 4–6
Win	2–3	Jul 2010	ITF Pattaya, Thailand	10k	Hard	(Thailand) Nudnida Luangnam	6–3, 6–4
Loss	2–4	Sep 2010	ITF Tsukuba, Japan	25k	Hard	(Thailand) Noppawan Lertcheewakarn	4–6, 1–6
Loss	2–5	Jun 2017	ITF Makinohara, Japan	25k	Carpet	(Japan) Kumiko Iijima	1–6, 2–6
Win	3–5	Jun 2013	ITF Tokyo, Japan	10k	Hard	(Japan) Akiko Yonemura	6–4, 6–4
Win	4–5	Sep 2016	ITF Noto, Japan	25k	Carpet	(Japan) Ayano Shimizu	6–4, 6–4
Loss	4–6	Sep 2016	ITF Hua Hin, Thailand	25k	Hard	(China) Gao Xinyu	2–6, 6–1, 5–7
Loss	4–7	Mar 2017	ITF Nishitama, Japan	15k	Hard	(Germany) Sarah-Rebecca Sekulic	4–6, 5–7
Win	5–7	Nov 2019	ITF Antalya, Turkey	W15	Hard	(Czech Republic) Magdaléna Pantůčková	6–2, 6–4
Win	6–7	Mar 2020	ITF Perth, Australia	W25	Hard	(France) Irina Ramialison	6–3, 6–3
Loss	6–8	May 2024	ITF Fukui, Japan	W15	Hard	(Japan) Mio Mushika	5–7, 4–6
Loss	6–9	May 2024	ITF Tokyo, Japan	W15	Hard	(Japan) Rina Saigo	6–4, 6–7^{(6)}, 5–7
Win	7–9	Jul 2024	ITF Sapporo, Japan	W15	Hard	(South Korea) Lee Eun-hye	3–6, 7–6^{(4)}, 6–1
Loss	7–10	Dec 2024	ITF Wellington, New Zealand	W15	Hard	(Indonesia) Janice Tjen	4–6, 4–6
Loss	7–11	Sep 2025	ITF Darwin, Australia	W35	Hard	(Australia) Taylah Preston	6–7^{(3)}, 3–6

=== Doubles: 9 (4 titles, 5 runner-ups) ===
Legend W25/35 tournaments W10/15 tournaments	Finals by surface Hard (3–5) Grass (1–0)

Result	W–L	Date	Tournament	Tier	Surface	Partner	Opponents	Score
Win	1–0	May 2013	ITF Karuizawa, Japan	25k	Grass	(Japan) Sachie Ishizu	(Japan) Miki Miyamura (Japan) Erika Takao	7–5, 7–6^{(8)}
Loss	1–1	Jun 2013	ITF Bangkok, Thailand	10k	Hard	(Japan) Akari Inoue	(Indonesia) Ayu-Fani Damayanti (Indonesia) Lavinia Tananta	6–1, 4–6, [6–10]
Win	2–1	Jan 2015	ITF Sharm El Sheik, Egypt	10k	Hard	(Japan) Yuuki Tanaka	(Sweden) Kajsa Rinaldo Persson (Norway) Caroline Rohde-Moe	6–2, 7–6^{(3)}
Loss	2–2	Aug 2016	ITF Tsukuba, Japan	25k	Hard	(Japan) Miki Miyamura	(China) Lu Jiajing (Japan) Akiko Omae	3–6, 6–4, [6–10]
Loss	2–3	Mar 2017	ITF Nishitama, Japan	15k	Hard	(Japan) Erika Sema	(Japan) Momoko Kobori (Japan) Kotomi Takahata	1–6, 2–6
Loss	2–4	Jun 2018	ITF Daegu, South Korea	25k	Hard	(Japan) Misaki Doi	(Chinese Taipei) Chang Kai-chen (Chinese Taipei) Hsu Ching-wen	1–2 ret.
Win	3–4	Jul 2024	ITF Sapporo, Japan	W15	Hard	(South Korea) Choi Ji-hee	(Japan) Ayumi Miyamoto (Japan) Anri Nagata	7–6^{(5)}, 6–7^{(5)}, [10–8]
Loss	3–5	Dec 2024	ITF Wellington, New Zealand	W15	Hard	(Japan) Nanari Katsumi	(New Zealand) Monique Barry (Netherlands) Merel Hoedt	3–6, 3–6
Win	4–5	Dec 2024	ITF Tauranga, New Zealand	W35	Hard	(Japan) Hiromi Abe	(Austria) Julia Grabher (New Zealand) Elyse Tse	6–2, 6–2
