= Eri Hozumi =

Japanese tennis player (born 1994)

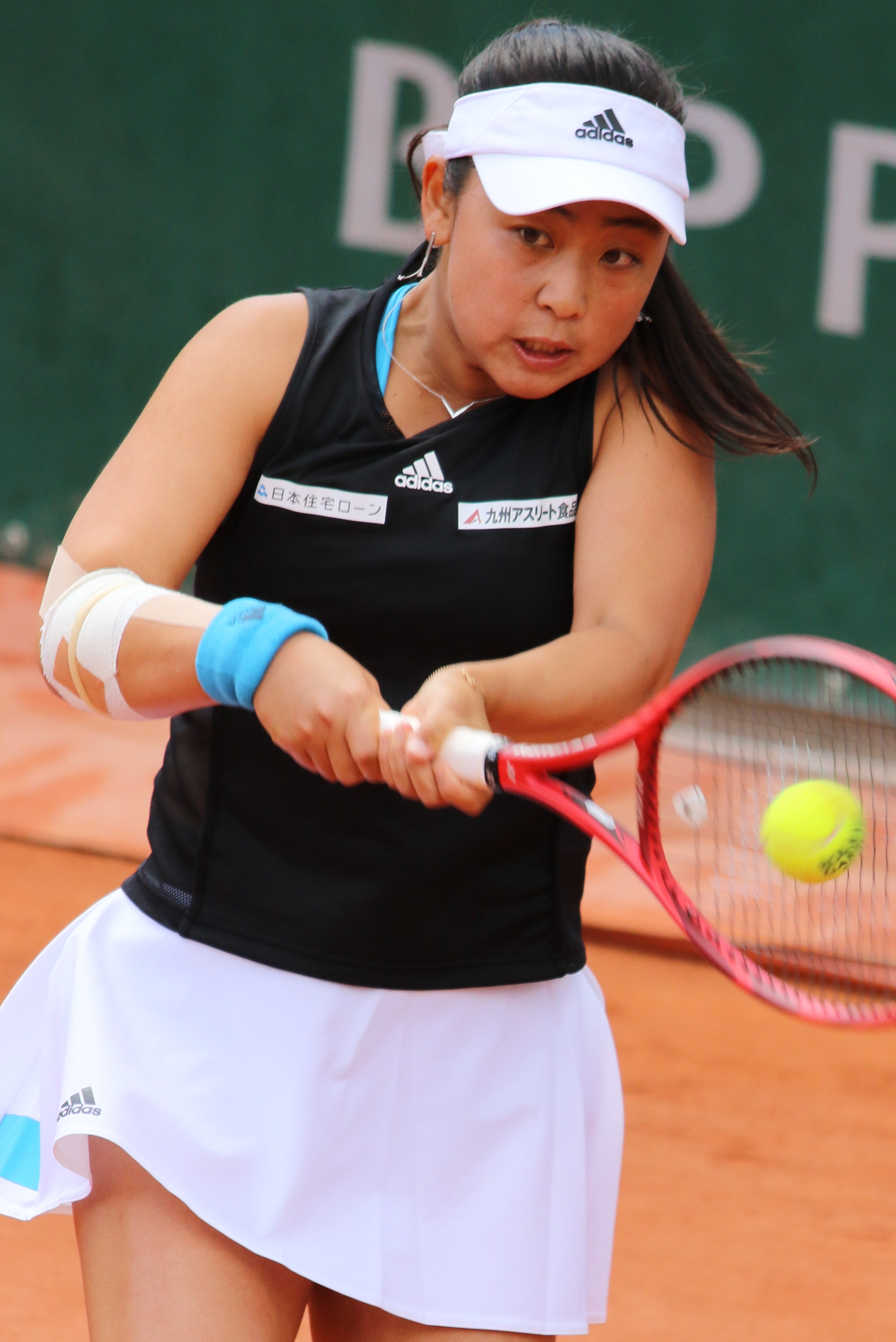
- Hozumi at the 2019 French Open
- Country (sports): Japan
- Born: 17 February 1994 (age 32) Hiratsuka, Japan
- Height: 1.68 m (5 ft 6 in)
- Plays: Right (two-handed backhand)
- Prize money: US$ 1,854,007

Singles
- Career record: 292–263
- Career titles: 5 ITF
- Highest ranking: No. 144 (10 November 2014)

Grand Slam singles results
- Australian Open: 1R (2017)
- French Open: Q2 (2014)
- Wimbledon: Q2 (2014, 2015)
- US Open: Q3 (2016)

Doubles
- Career record: 411–293
- Career titles: 6 WTA, 3 WTA Challengers
- Highest ranking: No. 27 (6 October 2025)
- Current ranking: No. 66 (20 July 2026)

Grand Slam doubles results
- Australian Open: SF (2017)
- French Open: F (2018)
- Wimbledon: 2R (2016, 2023, 2025)
- US Open: 3R (2016, 2026)

Grand Slam mixed doubles results
- Wimbledon: 3R (2018)

Team competitions
- Fed Cup: 19–5
Medal record
Representing Japan
Women's tennis
Asian Games
| Bronze medal – third place | 2014 Incheon | Singles |
| Bronze medal – third place | 2014 Incheon | Team event |
- Last updated on: 20 July 2026.

Eri Hozumi (穂積 絵莉, Hozumi Eri; born 17 February 1994) is a Japanese tennis player.

On 10 November 2014, she reached a career-high singles ranking of world No. 144. On 6 October 2025, she peaked at No. 27 in the WTA doubles rankings. Partnering with Makoto Ninomiya, she finished runner-up in the doubles draw of the 2018 French Open.

== Career ==
Hozumi won her first WTA Tour doubles title in 2016, at the Katowice Open alongside Miyu Kato. With Kato she also reached the semifinals of the 2017 Australian Open.

She reached her biggest final at the 2018 French Open with partner Makoto Ninomiya, losing to sixth seeds Barbora Krejčíková and Kateřina Siniaková.

Alongside Jang Su-jeong, Hozumi was runner-up in the doubles at the 2023 Swedish Open, losing to Misaki Doi and Rebecca Peterson in the final. Back playing with Makoto Ninomiya she reached the final of the 2023 Jiangxi Open where they lost to second seeds Laura Siegemund and Vera Zvonareva.

Partnering with Shuko Aoyama, Hozumi won the doubles title at the 2024 Pan Pacific Open, defeating Ena Shibahara and Laura Siegemund in the final. The pair were runners-up at the 2024 Hong Kong Open, losing to Ulrikke Eikeri and Makoto Ninomiya in the final which went to a deciding champions tiebreak.

== Performance timelines ==
Key
| W | F | SF | QF | #R | RR | Q# | DNQ | A | NH |

(W) winner; (F) finalist; (SF) semifinalist; (QF) quarterfinalist; (#R) rounds 4, 3, 2, 1; (RR) round-robin stage; (Q#) qualification round; (DNQ) did not qualify; (A) absent; (NH) not held; (SR) strike rate (events won / competed); (W–L) win–loss record.
To avoid confusion and double counting, these charts are updated at the conclusion of a tournament or when the player's participation has ended.

Only main-draw results in WTA Tour, Grand Slam tournaments, Fed Cup/Billie Jean King Cup and Olympic Games are included in win–loss records and career statistics.

=== Singles ===
Current through the 2023 French Open.

| Tournament | 2014 | 2015 | 2016 | 2017 | 2018 | 2019 | ... | 2023 | SR | W–L |
|---|---|---|---|---|---|---|---|---|---|---|
Grand Slam tournaments
| Australian Open | Q2 | Q2 | Q1 | 1R | Q1 | A | | A | 0 / 1 | 0–1 |
| French Open | Q2 | Q1 | Q1 | A | A | A | | A | 0 / 0 | 0–0 |
| Wimbledon | Q2 | Q2 | A | A | A | A | | A | 0 / 0 | 0–0 |
| US Open | Q1 | Q2 | Q3 | Q1 | A | A | | A | 0 / 0 | 0–0 |
| Win–loss | 0–0 | 0–0 | 0–0 | 0–1 | 0–0 | 0–0 | | 0–0 | 0 / 1 | 0–1 |
National representation
| Billie Jean King Cup | A | PO | Z1 | Z1 | A | WG2 | | PO | 0 / 0 | 3–1 |
WTA 1000
| Canadian Open | A | A | Q1 | Q1 | A | A | | | 0 / 0 | 0–0 |
Career statistics
| Tournaments | 2 | 0 (Note: During the season, she did not play in the main draw of any tour-level tournaments. However, she played in the Billie Jean King Cup, which is not counted as a played tournament but matches count.) | 2 | 2 | 1 | 0 | | 0 | Career total: 7 | |
| Overall win-loss | 1–2 | 2–0 | 1–3 | 1–2 | 1–1 | 0–0 | | 0–0 | 0 / 7 | 6–8 |
| Year-end ranking (Note: 2012: WTA ranking - 403, 2013: WTA ranking - 218, ... 2020: WTA ranking - 373, 2021: WTA ranking - 402, 2022: WTA ranking - 572.) | 170 | 193 | 215 | 172 | 293 | 361 | | 660 | $1,128,428 | |

=== Doubles ===
| Tournament | 2014 | 2015 | 2016 | 2017 | 2018 | 2019 | 2020 | 2021 | 2022 | 2023 | 2024 | 2025 | SR | W–L | Win% |
|---|---|---|---|---|---|---|---|---|---|---|---|---|---|---|---|
Grand Slam tournaments
| Australian Open | A | A | A | SF | 2R | 2R | A | A | 2R | 1R | 2R | | 0 / 6 | 8–6 | 57% |
| French Open | A | A | 2R | 2R | F | 1R | A | A | 1R | 2R | 2R | | 0 / 7 | 9–7 | 56% |
| Wimbledon | A | A | 2R | 1R | 1R | A | NH | A | A | 2R | 1R | | 0 / 5 | 2–5 | 29% |
| US Open | A | A | 3R | 2R | 1R | 1R | A | 2R | 1R | 1R | 1R | | 0 / 8 | 4–8 | 33% |
| Win–loss | 0–0 | 0–0 | 4–3 | 6–4 | 6–4 | 1–3 | 0–0 | 1–1 | 1–3 | 2–4 | 2–4 | | 0 / 26 | 23–26 | 47% |
National representation
| Summer Olympics | NH | | 2R | NH | | | | A | NH | | 0 / 1 | 1–1 | 50% | | |
WTA 1000
| Dubai / Qatar Open (Note: The first Premier 5 event of the year has switched back and forth between the Dubai Tennis Championships and the Qatar Ladies Open since 2009. Dubai was classified as a Premier 5 event from 2009 to 2011 before being succeeded by Doha for the 2012–2014 period. In 2015, Dubai regained its Premier 5 status while Doha was demoted to Premier status. The Premier 5 tournaments were reclassified as WTA 1000 tournaments in 2021.) | A | A | A | A | A | A | A | A | 1R | A | 2R | | 0 / 2 | 1–2 | 33% |
| Indian Wells Open | A | A | A | A | A | A | NH | A | 2R | 1R | 2R | | 0 / 3 | 2–3 | 40% |
| Miami Open | A | A | A | A | A | A | NH | A | 2R | 1R | 1R | | 0 / 3 | 1–3 | 25% |
| Madrid Open | A | A | A | A | A | A | NH | A | 1R | A | 1R | | 0 / 2 | 0–2 | 0% |
| Italian Open | A | A | A | 2R | A | A | A | A | 2R | A | 2R | | 0 / 3 | 3–3 | 50% |
| Canadian Open | A | A | 1R | 1R | A | 2R | NH | A | 1R | A | 1R | | 0 / 5 | 1–5 | 17% |
| Cincinnati Open | A | A | 2R | A | A | A | A | A | 1R | A | 1R | | 0 / 3 | 1–3 | 25% |
| Guadalajara Open | NH | | | | | | | | 2R | A | | | 0 / 1 | 1–1 | 50% |
Career statistics
| Tournaments | 4 | 5 | 14 | 11 | 8 | 10 | 1 | 11 | 25 | 5 | | | Career total: 88 | | |
| Titles | 0 | 0 | 1 | 0 | 1 | 0 | 0 | 0 | 3 | 0 | | | Career total: 5 | | |
| Finals | 0 | 0 | 2 | 0 | 3 | 1 | 0 | 1 | 3 | 0 | | | Career total: 10 | | |
| Overall win-loss | 1–4 | 7–5 | 21–14 | 15–12 | 14–7 | 11–10 | 0–1 | 16–10 | 19-23 | 3–4 | | | 5 / 91 | 107–90 | 54% |
| Year-end ranking | 142 | 83 | 54 | 43 | 31 | 83 | 144 | 67 | 37 | 48 | 45 | 47 | $913,031 | | |

== Grand Slam tournament finals ==
=== Doubles: 1 (runner-up) ===
| Result | Year | Tournament | Surface | Partner | Opponents | Score |
|---|---|---|---|---|---|---|
| Loss | 2018 | French Open | Clay | (Japan) Makoto Ninomiya | (Czech Republic) Barbora Krejčíková (Czech Republic) Kateřina Siniaková | 3–6, 3–6 |

== WTA Tour finals ==
=== Doubles: 16 (6 titles, 10 runner-ups) ===
Legend
Grand Slam (0–1)
WTA 500 (1–1)
WTA 250 (5–8)

| Result | W–L | Date | Tournament | Tier | Surface | Partner | Opponents | Score |
|---|---|---|---|---|---|---|---|---|
| Loss | 0–1 | Feb 2016 | Taipei Open, Taiwan | International (Note: The WTA International tournaments were reclassified as WTA 250 tournaments in 2021.) | Hard | (Japan) Miyu Kato | (Chinese Taipei) Chan Hao-ching (Chinese Taipei) Chan Yung-jan | 4–6, 3–6 |
| Win | 1–1 | Apr 2016 | Katowice Open, Poland | International | Hard (i) | (Japan) Miyu Kato | (Russia) Valentyna Ivakhnenko (Russia) Marina Melnikova | 3–6, 7–5, [10–8] |
| Loss | 1–2 | Jan 2018 | Auckland Classic, New Zealand | International | Hard | (Japan) Miyu Kato | (Italy) Sara Errani (Netherlands) Bibiane Schoofs | 5–7, 1–6 |
| Loss | 1–3 | Jun 2018 | French Open, France | Grand Slam | Clay | (Japan) Makoto Ninomiya | (Czech Republic) Barbora Krejčíková (Czech Republic) Kateřina Siniaková | 3–6, 3–6 |
| Win | 2–3 | Sep 2018 | Japan Women's Open, Japan | International | Hard | (China) Zhang Shuai | (Japan) Miyu Kato (Japan) Makoto Ninomiya | 6–2, 6–4 |
| Loss | 2–4 | Jan 2019 | Sydney International, Australia | Premier (Note: The WTA Premier tournaments were reclassified as WTA 500 tournaments in 2021.) | Hard | (Poland) Alicja Rosolska | (Serbia) Aleksandra Krunić (Czech Republic) Kateřina Siniaková | 1–6, 6–7^{(3)} |
| Loss | 2–5 | Oct 2021 | Courmayeur Open, Italy | WTA 250 | Hard (i) | (China) Zhang Shuai | (China) Wang Xinyu (China) Zheng Saisai | 4–6, 6–3, [5–10] |
| Win | 3–5 | Jan 2022 | Adelaide International, Australia | WTA 250 | Hard | (Japan) Makoto Ninomiya | (Czech Republic) Tereza Martincová (Czech Republic) Markéta Vondroušová | 1–6, 7–6^{(7–4)}, [10–7] |
| Win | 4–5 | May 2022 | Rabat Grand Prix, Morocco | WTA 250 | Clay | (Japan) Makoto Ninomiya | (Romania) Monica Niculescu; Alexandra Panova | 6–7^{(7–9)}, 6–3, [10–8] |
| Win | 5–5 | Jun 2022 | Bad Homburg Open, Germany | WTA 250 | Grass | (Japan) Makoto Ninomiya | (Poland) Alicja Rosolska (New Zealand) Erin Routliffe | 6–4, 6–7^{(5–7)}, [10–5] |
| Loss | 5–6 | Jun 2023 | Bad Homburg Open, Germany | WTA 250 | Grass | (Romania) Monica Niculescu | (Brazil) Ingrid Martins (Belarus) Lidziya Marozava | 0–6, 6–7^{(3–7)} |
| Loss | 5–7 | Sep 2023 | Guangzhou Open, China | WTA 250 | Hard | (Japan) Makoto Ninomiya | (China) Guo Hanyu (China) Jiang Xinyu | 3–6, 6–7^{(4–7)} |
| Loss | 5–8 | Oct 2023 | Jiangxi Open, China | WTA 250 | Hard | (Japan) Makoto Ninomiya | (Germany) Laura Siegemund (Russia) Vera Zvonareva | 4–6, 2–6 |
| Loss | 5–9 | Aug 2024 | Tennis in Cleveland, United States | WTA 250 | Hard | (Japan) Shuko Aoyama | (Spain) Cristina Bucșa (China) Xu Yifan | 6–3, 3–6, [6–10] |
| Win | 6–9 | Oct 2024 | Pan Pacific Open, Japan | WTA 500 | Hard | (Japan) Shuko Aoyama | (Japan) Ena Shibahara (Germany) Laura Siegemund | 6-4, 7-6^{(4–7)} |
| Loss | 6–10 | Oct 2024 | Hong Kong Open, China SAR | WTA 250 | Hard | (Japan) Shuko Aoyama | (Norway) Ulrikke Eikeri (Japan) Makoto Ninomiya | 4–6, 6–4, [9–11] |

== WTA 125 finals ==
=== Doubles: 8 (3 titles, 5 runner-ups) ===
| Result | W–L | Date | Tournament | Surface | Partner | Opponents | Score |
|---|---|---|---|---|---|---|---|
| Loss | 0–1 | Aug 2013 | Suzhou Ladies Open, China | Hard | (China) Han Xinyun | (Hungary) Tímea Babos (Netherlands) Michaëlla Krajicek | 2–6, 2–6 |
| Loss | 0–2 | Sep 2014 | Suzhou Ladies Open, China | Hard | (Japan) Misa Eguchi | (Chinese Taipei) Chan Chin-wei (Chinese Taipei) Chuang Chia-jung | 1–6, 6–3, [7–10] |
| Win | 1–2 | Nov 2016 | Hawaii Open, United States | Hard | (Japan) Miyu Kato | (United States) Nicole Gibbs (United States) Asia Muhammad | 6–7^{(3–7)}, 6–3, [10–8] |
| Loss | 1–3 | Nov 2017 | Hawaii Open, United States | Hard | (United States) Asia Muhammad | (Chinese Taipei) Hsieh Su-wei (Chinese Taipei) Hsieh Shu-ying | 1–6, 6–7^{(3–7)} |
| Win | 2–3 | Aug 2021 | Chicago Challenger, US | Hard | (Thailand) Peangtarn Plipuech | (Germany) Mona Barthel (Chinese Taipei) Hsieh Yu-chieh | 7–5, 6–2 |
| Win | 3–3 | May 2022 | Open de Saint-Malo, France | Clay | (Japan) Makoto Ninomiya | (France) Estelle Cascino (France) Jessika Ponchet | 7–6^{(7–1)}, 6–1 |
| Loss | 3–4 | May 2023 | Open de Saint-Malo, France | Clay | (Norway) Ulrikke Eikeri | (Belgium) Greet Minnen (Netherlands) Bibiane Schoofs | 6–7^{(7–9)}, 6–7^{(3–7)} |
| Loss | 3–5 | Jul 2023 | Bastad Open, Sweden | Clay | (South Korea) Jang Su-jeong | (Russia) Irina Khromacheva (Hungary) Panna Udvardy | 6–4, 3–6, [5–10] |

== ITF Circuit finals ==
=== Singles: 12 (5 titles, 7 runner-ups) ===
Legend
$50/60,000 tournaments (1–4)
$25,000 tournaments (4–2)
$15,000 tournaments (0–1)

| Result | W–L | Date | Tournament | Tier | Surface | Opponent | Score |
|---|---|---|---|---|---|---|---|
| Win | 1–0 | May 2013 | ITF Karuizawa, Japan | 25,000 | Grass | (Japan) Junri Namigata | 7–6^{(5)}, 6–3 |
| Loss | 1–1 | Sep 2013 | ITF Noto, Japan | 25,000 | Grass | (Serbia) Doroteja Erić | 0–6, 3–6 |
| Loss | 1–2 | Oct 2013 | ITF Hamamatsu, Japan | 25,000 | Carpet | (Japan) Shuko Aoyama | 6–7^{(4)}, 1–6 |
| Loss | 1–3 | May 2014 | Kurume Cup, Japan | 50,000 | Grass | (China) Wang Qiang | 3–6, 1–6 |
| Win | 2–3 | Nov 2014 | Bendigo International, Australia | 50,000 | Hard | (Japan) Risa Ozaki | 7–6^{(5)}, 5–7, 6–2 |
| Loss | 2–4 | May 2015 | Kurume Cup, Japan | 50,000 | Grass | (Japan) Nao Hibino | 3–6, 1–6 |
| Loss | 2–5 | Nov 2015 | Canberra International, Australia | 50,000 | Hard | (United States) Asia Muhammad | 4–6, 3–6 |
| Win | 3–5 | Mar 2016 | Clay Court International, Australia | 25,000 | Clay | (Australia) Destanee Aiava | 6–3, 3–6, 7–6^{(3)} |
| Loss | 3–6 | Jun 2017 | Ízmir Cup, Turkey | 60,000 | Hard | (Romania) Mihaela Buzărnescu | 1–6, 0–6 |
| Win | 4–6 | Oct 2017 | ITF Toowoomba, Australia | 25,000 | Hard | (Australia) Astra Sharma | 7–5, 6–2 |
| Win | 5–6 | Oct 2019 | ITF Hamamatsu, Japan | 25,000 | Carpet | (Spain) Paula Badosa | 7–6^{(1)}, 4–5 ret. |
| Loss | 5–7 | Mar 2021 | ITF Sharm El Sheikh, Egypt | 15,000 | Hard | (Japan) Sakura Hosogi | 5–7, 2–6 |

=== Doubles: 44 (23 titles, 21 runner-ups) ===
Legend
$100,000 tournaments (3–4)
$75/80,000 tournaments (3–1)
$50/60,000 tournaments (5–8)
$25,000 tournaments (10–4)
$10,000 tournaments (2–4)

| Result | W–L | Date | Tournament | Tier | Surface | Partner | Opponents | Score |
|---|---|---|---|---|---|---|---|---|
| Loss | 0–1 | Mar 2012 | ITF Kofu, Japan | 10,000 | Hard | (Japan) Remi Tezuka | (Japan) Ayumi Oka (Japan) Kotomi Takahata | 4–6, 7–5, [3–10] |
| Win | 1–1 | Mar 2012 | ITF Nishitama, Japan | 10,000 | Hard | (Japan) Remi Tezuka | (Japan) Kazusa Ito (Japan) Yuka Mori | 6–4, 6–7, [7–10] |
| Win | 2–1 | Jul 2012 | ITF Pattaya, Thailand | 10,000 | Hard | (Japan) Mari Tanaka | (New Zealand) Dianne Hollands (Australia) Tyra Calderwood | 4–6, 6–4, [12–10] |
| Loss | 2–2 | Aug 2012 | Bronx Open, United States | 50,000 | Hard | (Japan) Miki Miyamura | (Japan) Shuko Aoyama (Japan) Erika Sema | 4–6, 6–7^{(4)} |
| Win | 3–2 | Oct 2012 | ITF Makinohara, Japan | 25,000 | Grass | (Japan) Miyu Kato | (Australia) Monique Adamczak (France) Caroline Garcia | 7–6^{(6)}, 6–3 |
| Loss | 3–3 | Jan 2013 | ITF Hong Kong, China SAR | 10,000 | Hard | (Japan) Miyu Kato | (China) Tian Ran (China) Tang Haochen | 2–6, 1–6 |
| Loss | 3–4 | Jan 2013 | ITF Hong Kong, China SAR | 10,000 | Hard | (Japan) Miyu Kato | (China) Xin Wen (China) Li Yihong | 6–4, 1–6, [10–12] |
| Loss | 3–5 | Mar 2013 | ITF Nishitama, Japan | 10,000 | Hard | (Japan) Makoto Ninomiya | (South Korea) Han Na-lae (South Korea) Kang Seo-kyung | 4–6, 7–6^{(4)}, [6–10] |
| Win | 4–5 | Jun 2013 | ITF Bukhara, Uzbekistan | 25,000 | Hard | (Japan) Makoto Ninomiya | (Russia) Angelina Gabueva (Ukraine) Veronika Kapshay | 3–6, 7–5, [10–8] |
| Loss | 4–6 | Jul 2013 | ITF Waterloo, Canada | 50,000 | Clay | (Japan) Misa Eguchi | (Canada) Gabriela Dabrowski (Canada) Sharon Fichman | 6–7^{(6)}, 3–6 |
| Win | 5–6 | Sep 2013 | ITF Noto, Japan | 25,000 | Grass | (Japan) Makoto Ninomiya | (Japan) Kazusa Ito (Japan) Yuka Mori | 6–4, 6–4 |
| Win | 6–6 | Oct 2013 | ITF Makinohara, Japan | 25,000 | Grass | (Japan) Makoto Ninomiya | (Thailand) Nicha Lertpitaksinchai (Thailand) Peangtarn Plipuech | 6–1, 6–2 |
| Loss | 6–7 | Nov 2013 | Toyota World Challenge, Japan | 75,000 | Carpet (i) | (Japan) Makoto Ninomiya | (Japan) Shuko Aoyama (Japan) Misaki Doi | 6–7^{(1)}, 6–2, [9–11] |
| Win | 7–7 | Jan 2014 | ITF Hong Kong, China SAR | 25,000 | Hard | (Japan) Misa Eguchi | (Kazakhstan) Zarina Diyas (Hong Kong) Zhang Ling | 6–4, 6–2 |
| Loss | 7–8 | Jan 2014 | Burnie International, Australia | 50,000 | Hard | (Japan) Miki Miyamura | (Australia) Jarmila Gajdošová (Australia) Storm Sanders | 4–6, 4–6 |
| Win | 8–8 | Feb 2014 | ITF Surprise, United States | 25,000 | Hard (i) | (Japan) Shuko Aoyama | (United States) Sanaz Marand (United States) Ashley Weinhold | 6–3, 7–5 |
| Win | 9–8 | May 2014 | Fukuoka International, Japan | 50,000 | Carpet | (Japan) Shuko Aoyama | (United Kingdom) Naomi Broady (Greece) Eleni Daniilidou | 6–3, 6–4 |
| Win | 10–8 | Nov 2014 | Toyota World Challenge, Japan | 75,000 | Carpet (i) | (Japan) Makoto Ninomiya | (Japan) Shuko Aoyama (Japan) Junri Namigata | 6–3, 7–5 |
| Win | 11–8 | Mar 2015 | Blossom Cup, China | 50,000 | Hard | (Japan) Makoto Ninomiya | (Japan) Hiroko Kuwata (Japan) Junri Namigata | 6–3, 6–7^{(2)}, [10–2] |
| Loss | 11–9 | May 2015 | Fukuoka International, Japan | 50,000 | Carpet | (Japan) Junri Namigata | (United Kingdom) Naomi Broady (Czech Republic) Kristýna Plíšková | 3–6, 4–6 |
| Loss | 11–10 | May 2015 | Kurume Cup, Japan | 50,000 | Grass | (Japan) Junri Namigata | (Japan) Makoto Ninomiya (Japan) Riko Sawayanagi | 6–7^{(10)}, 3–6 |
| Win | 12–10 | Oct 2015 | ITF Toowoomba, Australia | 25,000 | Hard | (Japan) Misa Eguchi | (United States) Veronica Corning (United States) Jessica Wacnik | 4–6, 7–5, [10–5] |
| Win | 13–10 | Oct 2015 | Nanjing Ladies Open, China | 100,000 | Hard | (Japan) Shuko Aoyama | (Chinese Taipei) Chan Chin-wei (China) Zhang Kailin | 7–5, 6–7^{(7)}, [10–7] |
| Win | 14–10 | Nov 2015 | Canberra International, Australia | 50,000 | Hard | (Japan) Misa Eguchi | (United States) Lauren Embree (United States) Asia Muhammad | 7–6^{(13)}, 1–6, [14–12] |
| Loss | 14–11 | Nov 2015 | Tokyo Open, Japan | 100,000 | Hard | (Japan) Kurumi Nara | (Japan) Shuko Aoyama (Japan) Makoto Ninomiya | 6–3, 2–6, [7–10] |
| Loss | 14–12 | Mar 2016 | Clay Court International, Australia | 25,000 | Clay | (Japan) Miyu Kato | (Australia) Ashleigh Barty (Australia) Arina Rodionova | 7–5, 3–6, [7–10] |
| Win | 15–12 | May 2016 | Kangaroo Cup Gifu, Japan | 75,000 | Hard | (Japan) Miyu Kato | (Japan) Hiroko Kuwata (Japan) Ayaka Okuno | 6–1, 6–2 |
| Loss | 15–13 | Mar 2017 | Pingshan Open, China | 60,000 | Hard | (Russia) Valeria Savinykh | (Ukraine) Lyudmyla Kichenok (Ukraine) Nadiia Kichenok | 4–6, 4–6 |
| Win | 16–13 | May 2017 | Kangaroo Cup Gifu, Japan (2) | 80,000 | Hard | (Japan) Miyu Kato | (United Kingdom) Katy Dunne (Israel) Julia Glushko | 6–4, 6–2 |
| Win | 17–13 | May 2017 | ITF Rome, Italy | 25,000 | Clay | (Japan) Miyu Kato | (Georgia (country)) Ekaterine Gorgodze (Norway) Melanie Stokke | 6–1, 6–4 |
| Loss | 17–14 | Oct 2017 | Suzhou Ladies Open, China | 60,000 | Hard | (Japan) Miyu Kato | (United States) Jacqueline Cako (Serbia) Nina Stojanović | 6–2, 5–7, [2–10] |
| Loss | 17–15 | Nov 2017 | Tokyo Open, Japan | 100,000 | Hard | (Japan) Junri Namigata | (Japan) Yuki Naito (Japan) Rika Fujiwara | 1–6, 3–6 |
| Loss | 17–16 | Oct 2018 | Bendigo International, Australia | 60,000 | Hard | (Japan) Risa Ozaki | (Australia) Ellen Perez (Australia) Arina Rodionova | 5–7, 1–6 |
| Loss | 17–17 | Feb 2019 | ITF Jodhpur, India | 25,000 | Hard | (Japan) Miyabi Inoue | (Japan) Mana Ayukawa (Japan) Haruka Kaji | 6–7^{(4)}, 6–4, [5–10] |
| Win | 18–17 | Feb 2019 | Indoor Championships, Japan | 60,000 | Hard (i) | (Japan) Moyuka Uchijima | (Chinese Taipei) Chen Pei-hsuan (Chinese Taipei) Wu Fang-hsien | 6–4, 6–3 |
| Win | 19–17 | Oct 2019 | ITF Pula, Italy | 25,000 | Clay | (Japan) Yuki Naito | (Russia) Amina Anshba (Czech Republic) Anastasia Dețiuc | 6–4, 7–6^{(1)} |
| Loss | 19–18 | May 2021 | ITF Charleston Pro, United States | W100 | Clay | (Japan) Miyu Kato | (United States) Caty McNally (Australia) Storm Sanders | 5–7, 6–4, [6–10] |
| Loss | 19–19 | May 2021 | Bonita Springs Championship, US | W100 | Clay | (Japan) Miyu Kato | (New Zealand) Erin Routliffe (Indonesia) Aldila Sutjiadi | 3–6, 6–4, [6–10] |
| Loss | 19–20 | Jun 2021 | ITF Montemor-o-Novo, Portugal | W25 | Hard | (Japan) Akiko Omae | (Norway) Ulrikke Eikeri (Greece) Valentini Grammatikopoulou | 1–6, 0–6 |
| Win | 20–20 | Jul 2021 | ITF Palma del Río, Spain | W25 | Hard | (Russia) Valeria Savinykh | (Japan) Himari Sato (Switzerland) Lulu Sun | 7–6^{(6)}, 6–3 |
| Win | 21–20 | Feb 2023 | Burnie International, Australia | W60 | Hard | (Japan) Mai Hontama | (Japan) Ena Shibahara (Australia) Arina Rodionova | 4–6, 6–3, [10–6] |
| Loss | 21–21 | Apr 2023 | ITF Kofu, Japan | W25 | Hard | (Spain) Georgina Garcia-Perez | (South Korea) Han Na-lae (South Korea) Jang Su-jeong | 0–6, 4–6 |
| Win | 22–21 | Apr 2023 | Oeiras Ladies Open, Portugal | W100 | Clay | (Norway) Ulrikke Eikeri | (Portugal) Francisca Jorge (Portugal) Matilde Jorge | 4–6, 6–4, [10–5] |
| Win | 23–21 | May 2023 | Open Villa de Madrid, Spain | W100 | Clay | (Japan) Mai Hontama | (Greece) Eleni Christofi (Greece) Despina Papamichail | 6–0, 7–5 |
