= Kurume Cup =

- 2026 Kurume International

ITF Women's Tour
- Event name: Kurume U.S.E Cup (2017–); Kurume Best Amenity Cup (2005–2016)
- Location: Kurume, Japan
- Venue: Shin-Houman-Gawa Tennis Court
- Category: ITF Women's Circuit
- Surface: Carpet (outdoor)
- Draw: 32S/32Q/16D
- Prize money: $60,000
- Website: www.itf-kurume.jp/

The Kurume Cup is a tennis tournament held in Kurume, Japan. Held since 2005, this ITF Circuit event is a $60,000 tournament played on outdoor carpet courts. It started off being a $25k event in 2005 on grass courts (until 2016) and went up to $50k in 2008.

== Past finals ==
=== Singles ===
Year	Champion	Runner-up	Score
2026	(United Kingdom) Katie Swan	(Japan) Kyōka Okamura	7–5, 6–1
2025	(Kazakhstan) Zarina Diyas	(Japan) Ayano Shimizu	6–4, 6–3
2024	(United States) Emina Bektas	(Australia) Arina Rodionova	7–6^{(7–1)}, 3–6, 6–3
2023	(United States) Emina Bektas	(China) Ma Yexin	7–5, 5–7, 6–1
2020–22	tournament cancelled due to the COVID-19 pandemic		
2019	(Canada) Rebecca Marino	(Japan) Yuki Naito	6–4, 7–6^{(7–0)}
2018	(Japan) Ayano Shimizu	(Australia) Abbie Myers	6–3, 7–5
2017	(United Kingdom) Laura Robson	(United Kingdom) Katie Boulter	6–3, 6–4
2016	(Japan) Kyōka Okamura	(Uzbekistan) Nigina Abduraimova	7–6^{(12–10)}, 1–6, 7–5
2015	(Japan) Nao Hibino	(Japan) Eri Hozumi	6–3, 6–1
2014	(China) Wang Qiang	(Japan) Eri Hozumi	6–3, 6–1
2013	(Tunisia) Ons Jabeur	(Belgium) An-Sophie Mestach	6–0, 6–2
2012	(China) Zheng Saisai	(Australia) Monique Adamczak	7–5, 6–2
2011	(Japan) Rika Fujiwara	(Australia) Monique Adamczak	6–3, 6–1
2010	(Czech Republic) Kristýna Plíšková	(Czech Republic) Karolína Plíšková	5–7, 6–2, 6–0
2009	(Russia) Ksenia Lykina	(Russia) Elena Chalova	7–5, 6–3
2008	(Chinese Taipei) Chang Kai-chen	(Russia) Alexandra Panova	7–5, 6–3
2007	(Japan) Ayumi Morita	(Japan) Erika Takao	6–1, 3–1 retired
2006	(Chinese Taipei) Chan Yung-jan	(Chinese Taipei) Chuang Chia-jung	5–7, 6–4, 6–2
2005	(Chinese Taipei) Hsieh Su-wei	(Japan) Erika Takao	6–2, 6–3

=== Doubles ===
Year	Champions	Runners-up	Score
2026	(Chinese Taipei) Lee Ya-hsin (China) Ye Qiuyu	(Australia) Gabriella Da Silva-Fick (Australia) Tenika McGiffin	6–3, 6–2
2025	(Japan) Momoko Kobori (Japan) Ayano Shimizu	(China) Ma Yexin (China) Wang Meiling	6–1, 5–7, [10–5]
2024	(United Kingdom) Madeleine Brooks (United Kingdom) Sarah Beth Grey	(Japan) Momoko Kobori (Japan) Ayano Shimizu	6–4, 6–0
2023	(Australia) Talia Gibson (China) Wang Yafan	(Japan) Funa Kozaki (Japan) Junri Namigata	6–3, 6–3
2020–22	tournament cancelled due to the COVID-19 pandemic		
2019	(Japan) Hiroko Kuwata (United States) Ena Shibahara	(Japan) Erina Hayashi (Japan) Moyuka Uchijima	0–6, 6–4, [10–5]
2018	(United Kingdom) Naomi Broady (United States) Asia Muhammad	(United Kingdom) Katy Dunne (Papua New Guinea) Abigail Tere-Apisah	6–2, 6–4
2017	(United Kingdom) Katy Dunne (Australia) Tammi Patterson	(Japan) Erina Hayashi (Japan) Robu Kajitani	6–7^{(3–7)}, 6–2, [10–4]
2016	(Chinese Taipei) Hsu Ching-wen (Russia) Ksenia Lykina	(Hungary) Dalma Gálfi (China) Xu Shilin	7–6^{(7–5)}, 6–2
2015	(Japan) Makoto Ninomiya (Japan) Riko Sawayanagi	(Japan) Eri Hozumi (Japan) Junri Namigata	7–6^{(12–10)}, 6–3
2014	(Australia) Jarmila Gajdošová (Australia) Arina Rodionova	(Japan) Junri Namigata (Japan) Akiko Yonemura	6–4, 6–2
2013	(Japan) Kanae Hisami (Japan) Mari Tanaka	(Japan) Rika Fujiwara (Japan) Akiko Omae	6–4, 7–6^{(7–2)}
2012	(China) Han Xinyun (China) Sun Shengnan	(Russia) Ksenia Lykina (United Kingdom) Melanie South	6–1, 6–0
2011	(Japan) Ayumi Oka (Japan) Akiko Yonemura	(Japan) Rika Fujiwara (Thailand) Tamarine Tanasugarn	6–3, 5–7, [10–8]
2010	(China) Sun Shengnan (China) Xu Yifan	(Czech Republic) Karolína Plíšková (Czech Republic) Kristýna Plíšková	6–0, 6–3
2009	(China) Lu Jingjing (China) Sun Shengnan	(Chinese Taipei) Chang Kai-chen (Japan) Ayaka Maekawa	6–3, 6–2
2008	(Chinese Taipei) Chang Kai-chen (Chinese Taipei) Hwang I-hsuan	(Japan) Erika Sema (Japan) Yurika Sema	6–3, 2–6, [10–6]
2007	(Japan) Ayumi Oka (Japan) Tomoko Sugano	(China) Liu Wanting (China) Song Shanshan	6–4, 6–1
2006	(Chinese Taipei) Chan Yung-jan (Chinese Taipei) Chuang Chia-jung	(Japan) Seiko Okamoto (Japan) Ayami Takase	6–0, 6–2
2005	(Chinese Taipei) Chan Chin-wei (Chinese Taipei) Hsieh Su-wei	(Japan) Ayumi Morita (Japan) Erika Sema	6–4, 6–3
