= Miyabi Inoue =

Japanese tennis player

Miyabi Inoue 井上 雅
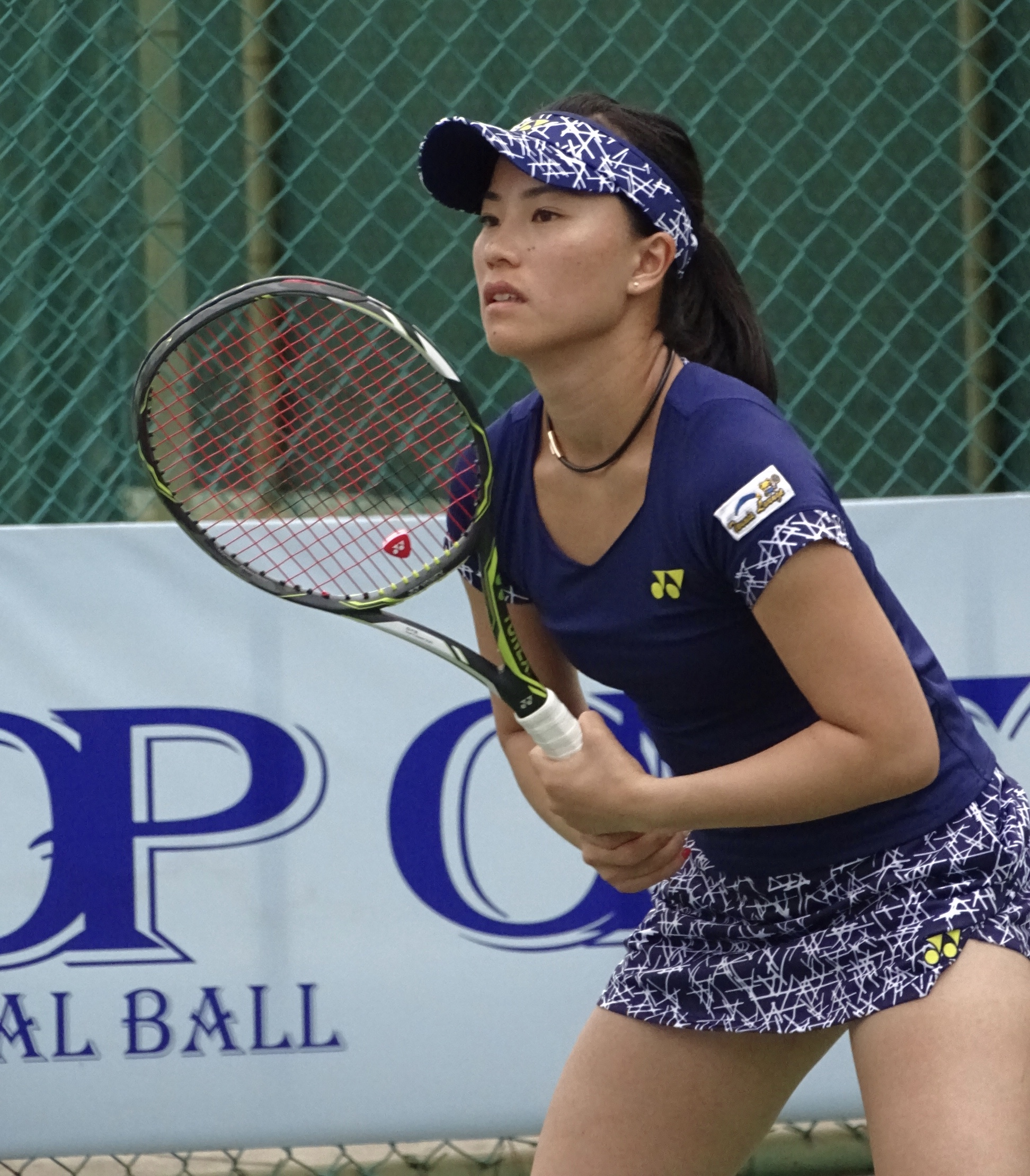
- 2017 in Nonthaburi
- Country (sports): Japan
- Residence: Nagoya
- Born: 19 November 1991 (age 34) Kasugai, Aichi
- Plays: Right (two-handed backhand)
- Prize money: $140,174

Singles
- Career record: 252–249
- Career titles: 5 ITF
- Highest ranking: No. 275 (28 September 2015)

Grand Slam singles results
- Australian Open Junior: 3R (2009)
- French Open Junior: 1R (2008)
- Wimbledon Junior: SF (2009)
- US Open Junior: 1R (2009)

Doubles
- Career record: 184–164
- Career titles: 9 ITF
- Highest ranking: No. 199 (27 July 2015)

Grand Slam doubles results
- Australian Open Junior: 2R (2009)
- French Open Junior: 1R (2008)
- Wimbledon Junior: QF (2009)
- US Open Junior: QF (2009)

Miyabi Inoue (井上 雅, Inoue Miyabi; born 19 November 1991) is a former tennis player from Japan.

== Career ==
Inoue reached the semifinals of the 2009 Wimbledon girls' singles tournament.

On 28 September 2015, she achieved her career-high WTA singles ranking of No. 275.

Inoue made her main-draw debut on the WTA Tour in doubles competition at the 2015 Pan Pacific Open, partnering Kyōka Okamura.

== ITF Circuit finals ==
=== Singles: 12 (5 titles, 7 runner-ups) ===
Legend $25,000 tournaments $15,000 tournaments $10,000 tournaments	Finals by surface Hard (5–5) Clay (0–1) Carpet (0–1)

Outcome	No.	Date	Tournament	Surface	Opponent	Score
Runner-up	1.	6 June 2010	ITF Komoro, Japan	Clay	(Japan) Sachie Ishizu	0–6, 1–6
Winner	1.	6 July 2012	ITF New Delhi, India	Hard	(India) Ankita Raina	6–2, 6–2
Winner	2.	28 July 2012	ITF İzmir, Turkey	Hard	(Slovakia) Zuzana Zlochová	0–6, 7–5, 7–5
Runner-up	2.	17 June 2013	ITF İstanbul, Turkey	Hard	(Belarus) Darya Lebesheva	6–7^{(1–7)}, 4–6
Winner	3.	30 June 2013	ITF İstanbul, Turkey	Hard	(Greece) Agni Stefanou	6–3, 6–4
Winner	4.	4 August 2013	ITF Nottingham, UK	Hard	(Japan) Yuka Higuchi	7–6^{(7–5)}, 6–2
Winner	5.	30 March 2014	ITF Nishitama, Japan	Hard	(Thailand) Nudnida Luangnam	1–6, 7–5, 6–1
Runner-up	3.	2 June 2014	ITF Tokyo, Japan	Hard	(Japan) Mana Ayukawa	6–2, 0–6, 3–6
Runner-up	4.	28 March 2015	ITF Bangkok, Thailand	Hard	(South Korea) Jang Su-jeong	2–6, 4–6
Runner-up	5.	5 April 2015	ITF Bangkok, Thailand	Hard	(South Africa) Chanel Simmonds	6–7^{(4–7)}, 3–6
Runner-up	6.	22 October 2017	ITF Hamamatsu, Japan	Hard	(China) Lu Jiajing	3–6, 3–6
Runner-up	7.	27 May 2018	ITF Karuizawa, Japan	Carpet	(Japan) Momoko Kobori	0–6, 2–6

=== Doubles: 20 (9 titles, 11 runner-ups) ===
Legend $25,000 tournaments $15,000 tournaments $10,000 tournaments	Finals by surface Hard (7–8) Clay (0–1) Carpet (2–2)

Outcome	No.	Date	Tournament	Surface	Partner	Opponents	Score
Runner-up	1.	19 April 2010	ITF Mie, Japan	Carpet	(Japan) Aiko Yoshitomi	(Japan) Yurina Koshino (Japan) Miki Miyamura	4–6, 6–7^{(7)}
Runner-up	2.	6 June 2011	ITF Tokyo, Japan	Hard	(Japan) Sakiko Shimizu	(Japan) Yuka Higuchi (Japan) Hirono Watanabe	2–6, 3–6
Winner	1.	20 August 2011	ITF Taipei, Taiwan	Hard	(Japan) Mari Tanaka	(South Korea) Chae Kyung-yee (South Korea) Kim Hae-sung	7–5, 2–6, 6–4
Winner	2.	5 July 2012	ITF New Delhi, India	Hard	(Japan) Risa Hasegawa	(India) Shweta Rana (India) Prarthana Thombare	1–6, 7–5, [10–1]
Winner	3.	12 October 2012	ITF Margaret River, Australia	Hard	(Japan) Mai Minokoshi	(Thailand) Nicha Lertpitaksinchai (Thailand) Peangtarn Plipuech	6–7^{(8)}, 7–6^{(3)}, [14–12]
Runner-up	3.	2 March 2014	ITF Port Pirie, Australia	Hard	(Japan) Hiroko Kuwata	(Australia) Jessica Moore (Bulgaria) Aleksandrina Naydenova	4–6, 3–6
Winner	4.	6 September 2014	ITF Noto, Japan	Carpet	(Japan) Riko Sawayanagi	(Japan) Miki Miyamura (Japan) Chihiro Nunome	6–3, 7–6^{(2)}
Winner	5.	31 October 2014	ITF Margaret River, Australia	Hard	(Thailand) Varatchaya Wongteanchai	(Germany) Carolin Daniels (Germany) Laura Schaeder	4–6, 6–4, [10–3]
Runner-up	4.	15 December 2014	ITF Navi Mumbai, India	Hard	(Japan) Miki Miyamura	(Greece) Despina Papamichail (Serbia) Nina Stojanović	6–7^{(5)}, 2–6
Runner-up	5.	30 March 2015	ITF Bangkok, Thailand	Clay	(Japan) Akiko Omae	(Japan) Nao Hibino (Japan) Miyu Kato	4–6, 2–6
Runner-up	6.	6 August 2016	ITF Nonthaburi, Thailand	Hard	(Japan) Akiko Omae	(Russia) Olga Doroshina (Russia) Yana Sizikova	6–4, 3–6, [9–11]
Winner	6.	17 February 2017	ITF Wirral, United Kingdom	Hard (i)	(Poland) Maja Chwalińska	(United States) Emina Bektas (United States) Ronit Yurovsky	6–4, 6–4
Runner-up	7.	3 September 2017	ITF Nanao, Japan	Carpet	(Japan) Akari Inoue	(Chinese Taipei) Hsu Chieh-yu (Japan) Miharu Imanishi	6–7^{(7)}, 2–6
Winner	7.	14 October 2017	ITF Makinohara, Japan	Carpet	(Japan) Kotomi Takahata	(Japan) Yukina Saigo (Japan) Ayano Shimizu	6–3, 7–5
Runner-up	8.	8 June 2018	ITF Singapore	Hard	(Japan) Junri Namigata	(Australia) Zoe Hives (Australia) Olivia Tjandramulia	4–6, 6–4, [6–10]
Winner	8.	7 December 2018	ITF Solapur, India	Hard	(China) Lu Jiajing	(United Kingdom) Sarah Beth Grey (Russia) Ekaterina Yashina	6–3, 6–3
Runner-up	9.	2 February 2019	ITF Jodhpur, India	Hard	(Japan) Eri Hozumi	(Japan) Mana Ayukawa (Japan) Haruka Kaji	6–7^{(4)}, 6–4, [5–10]
Runner-up	10.	January 2020	ITF Nonthaburi, Thailand	Hard	(China) Kang Jiaqi	(Netherlands) Bibiane Schoofs (India) Ankita Raina	2–6, 6–3, [7–10]
Winner	9.	February 2020	ITF Jodhpur, India	Hard	(India) Rutuja Bhosale	(India) Snehal Mane (India) Ankita Raina	4–6, 6–4, [10–8]
Runner-up	11.	February 2021	ITF Sharm El Sheikh, Egypt	Hard	(Chinese Taipei) Liang En-shuo	(Japan) Erika Sema (Belarus) Shalimar Talbi	6–2, 0–6, [12–14]
