= Ayaka Okuno =

Japanese tennis player (born 1995)

Ayaka Okuno 奥野 彩加
- Country (sports): Japan
- Residence: Santa Clara, California, U.S.
- Born: 21 June 1995 (age 31) Osaka Prefecture, Japan
- Height: 1.70 m (5 ft 7 in)
- Plays: Right (two-handed backhand)
- Prize money: $109,946

Singles
- Career record: 179–226
- Career titles: 2 ITF
- Highest ranking: No. 263 (22 February 2016)

Doubles
- Career record: 233–194
- Career titles: 13 ITF
- Highest ranking: No. 147 (10 April 2017)

Ayaka Okuno (奥野 彩加, Okuno Ayaka; born 21 June 1995) is a Japanese former professional tennis player.

Okuno was born in Osaka Prefecture. She attended the University of Georgia in the United States. In her career, she won two singles titles and 13 doubles titles on the ITF Women's Circuit. On 22 February 2016, she reached her best singles ranking of world No. 263. On 10 April 2017, she peaked at No. 147 in the doubles rankings.

Okuno made her WTA Tour singles debut at the 2016 Taiwan Open, where she qualified for the main draw.

Okuno lives in California.

== ITF Circuit finals ==
=== Singles: 3 (2–1) ===
Legend $15,000 tournaments	Finals by surface Hard (2–1)

Result	No.	Date	Tournament	Surface	Opponent	Score
Win	1.	6 October 2014	ITF Cairns, Australia	Hard	(Sweden) Ellen Allgurin	6–1, 7–5
Win	2.	20 July 2015	ITF Hong Kong, China SAR	Hard	(India) Prerna Bhambri	6–4, 6–0
Loss	1.	18 February 2017	ITF Nanjing, China	Hard	(China) Xun Fangying	4–6, 4–6

=== Doubles: 29 (13–16) ===
Legend $75,000 tournaments $50,000 tournaments $25,000 tournaments $15,000 tournaments $10,000 tournaments	Finals by surface Hard (7–12) Clay (4–1) Carpet (2–3)

Result	No.	Date	Tournament	Surface	Partner	Opponents	Score
Loss	1.	21 April 2014	ITF Bangkok, Thailand	Hard	(Australia) Ashling Sumner	(Japan) Yurina Koshino (Japan) Chihiro Nunome	4–6, 2–6
Win	1.	2 June 2014	ITF Pachuca, Mexico	Hard	(Russia) Vera Aleshcheva	(Mexico) Giovanna Manifacio (Mexico) Yadira Rubio	7–6^{(5)}, 3–6, [10–7]
Loss	2.	8 August 2014	ITF Caracas, Venezuela	Hard	(France) Clothilde de Bernardi	(Argentina) Vanesa Furlanetto (Argentina) Florencia Molinero	0–6, 0–6
Loss	3.	25 August 2014	ITF San Luis Potosí, Mexico	Hard	(United States) Erin Clark	(Mexico) Victoria Rodríguez (Mexico) Marcela Zacarías	1–6, 7–5, [8–10]
Loss	4.	13 September 2014	ITF Kyoto, Japan	Hard (i)	(Japan) Michika Ozeki	(Japan) Makoto Ninomiya (Japan) Kyōka Okamura	3–6, 3–6
Loss	5.	8 October 2014	ITF Cairns, Australia	Hard	(Australia) Alison Bai	(Australia) Jessica Moore (Australia) Abbie Myers	2–6, 2–6
Win	2.	24 January 2015	ITF Saint Martin, France	Hard	(United States) Alexa Guarachi	(United States) Lena Litvak (Canada) Sonja Molnar	7–5, 6–3
Loss	6.	22 March 2015	ITF Irapuato, Mexico	Hard	(Mexico) Ana Sofía Sánchez	(Mexico) Marcela Zacarías (Mexico) Victoria Rodríguez	1–6, 5–7
Loss	7.	28 March 2015	ITF Mornington, Australia	Clay	(Japan) Mana Ayukawa	(Australia) Priscilla Hon (Australia) Tammi Patterson	4–6, 6–7^{(4)}
Win	3.	25 September 2015	ITF Bangkok, Thailand	Hard	(Japan) Hiroko Kuwata	(Japan) Mana Ayukawa (Japan) Yuuki Tanaka	2–6, 6–1, [10–6]
Win	4.	30 October 2015	ITF Bangkok, Thailand	Hard	(Ukraine) Valeriya Strakhova	(Thailand) Chompoothip Jandakate (Thailand) Peangtarn Plipuech	6–2, 7–6^{(2)}
Loss	8.	7 May 2016	Kangaroo Cup, Japan	Hard	(Japan) Hiroko Kuwata	(Japan) Eri Hozumi (Japan) Miyu Kato	1–6, 2–6
Win	5.	4 September 2016	ITF Noto, Japan	Carpet	(Japan) Rika Fujiwara	(Japan) Akari Inoue (Japan) Miki Miyamura	6–4, 1–6, [10–6]
Win	6.	22 October 2016	ITF Hamamatsu, Japan	Carpet	(Croatia) Jana Fett	(Chinese Taipei) Hsu Chieh-yu (Poland) Justyna Jegiołka	4–6, 7–6^{(5)}, [12–10]
Loss	9.	19 November 2016	Toyota World Challenge, Japan	Carpet (i)	(Japan) Rika Fujiwara	(Russia) Ksenia Lykina (Japan) Akiko Omae	7–6^{(4)}, 2–6, [5–10]
Win	7.	21 January 2017	ITF Cairo, Egypt	Clay	(Slovakia) Chantal Škamlová	(Oman) Fatma Al-Nabhani (Egypt) Sandra Samir	4–6, 6–4, [10–6]
Win	8.	28 January 2017	ITF Cairo, Egypt	Clay	(Slovakia) Chantal Škamlová	(Oman) Fatma Al-Nabhani (Egypt) Sandra Samir	6–3, 6–1
Win	9.	11 March 2017	ITF Yokohama, Japan	Hard	(Japan) Erika Sema	(Japan) Kanako Morisaki (Japan) Minori Yonehara	6–4, 6–4
Loss	10.	27 May 2017	ITF Karuizawa, Japan	Carpet	(Australia) Tammi Patterson	(Japan) Chisa Hosonuma (Japan) Kanako Morisaki	5–7, 3–6
Loss	11.	5 August 2017	ITF Fort Worth, US	Hard	(Japan) Miharu Imanishi	(Mexico) Giuliana Olmos (Australia) Ellen Perez	4–6, 3–6
Loss	12.	9 September 2017	ITF Kyoto, Japan	Hard (i)	(Sweden) Kajsa Rinaldo Persson	(Japan) Akari Inoue (Japan) Michika Ozeki	6–4, 3–6, [8–10]
Loss	13.	22 October 2017	ITF Hamamatsu, Japan	Carpet	(China) Lu Jiajing	(Japan) Rika Fujiwara (Japan) Kyōka Okamura	2–6, 4–6
Win	10.	7 April 2018	ITF Kashiwa, Japan	Hard	(Japan) Kyōka Okamura	(South Korea) Han Na-lae (Japan) Robu Kajitani	6–2, 6–2
Win	11.	13 July 2018	ITF Solo, Indonesia	Hard	(Indonesia) Rifanty Kahfiani	(Indonesia) Fitriani Sabatini (Indonesia) Fitriana Sabrina	6–4, 6–0
Loss	14.	4 August 2018	ITF Fort Worth, US	Hard	(Australia) Olivia Tjandramulia	(Chinese Taipei) Hsu Chieh-yu (Mexico) Marcela Zacarías	6–3, 6–7^{(6)}, [6–10]
Loss	15.	30 November 2018	ITF Hua Hin, Thailand	Hard	(Indonesia) Aldila Sutjiadi	(Thailand) Nudnida Luangnam (Thailand) Bunyawi Thamchaiwat	4–6, 2–6
Win	12.	19 January 2019	ITF Antalya, Turkey	Clay	(Japan) Kanako Morisaki	(Israel) Vlada Ekshibarova (Bulgaria) Julia Stamatova	6–2, 6–2
Win	13.	4 February 2019	ITF Antalya, Turkey	Clay	(Japan) Kanako Morisaki	(Japan) Haruna Arakawa (Turkey) Doga Turkmen	7–5, 6–3
Loss	16.	26 February 2023	ITF Kuala Lumpur, Malaysia	Hard	(Thailand) Anchisa Chanta	(China) Guo Hanyu (Chinese Taipei) Li Yu-yun	0–6, 6–2, [2–10]
