= Miki Miyamura =

Japanese tennis player (born 1985)

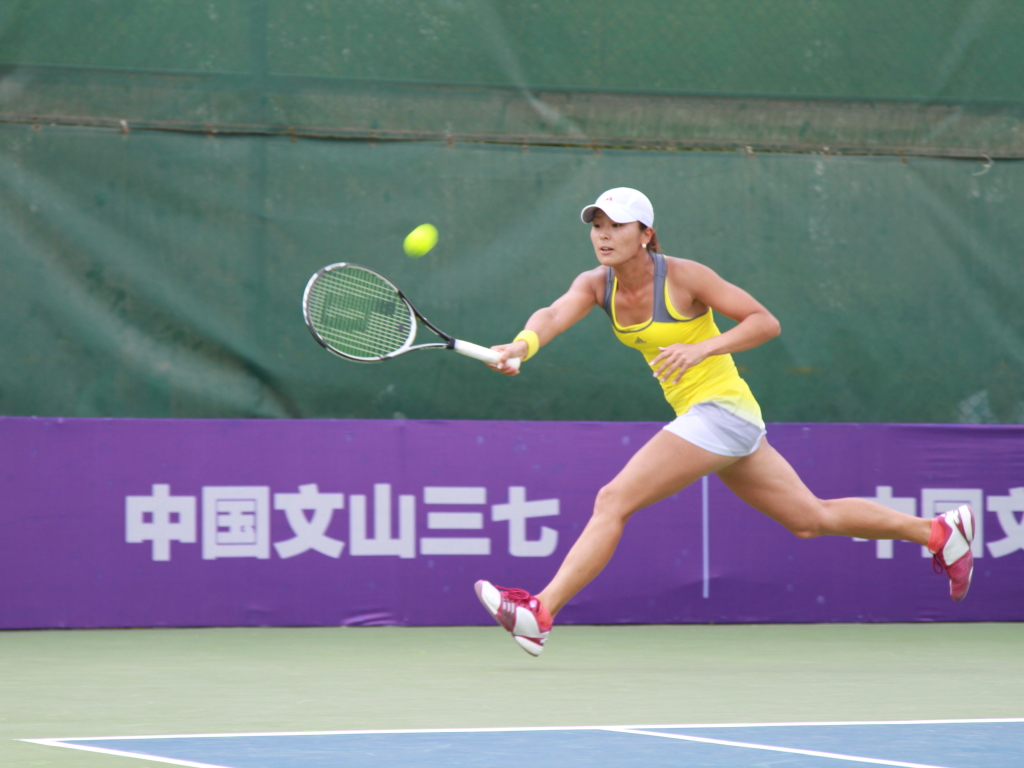
- Miyamura at the 2013 ITF Wenshan
- Country (sports): Japan
- Born: 4 November 1985 (age 40) Kodaira, Japan
- Height: 1.67 m (5 ft 6 in)
- Plays: Right (one-handed backhand)
- Prize money: $128,268

Singles
- Career record: 223–200
- Career titles: 4 ITF
- Highest ranking: No. 310 (21 April 2014)

Doubles
- Career record: 254–160
- Career titles: 20 ITF
- Highest ranking: No. 110 (21 October 2013)

Grand Slam doubles results
- Australian Open: 1R (2014)

Miki Miyamura (宮村 美紀, Miyamura Miki; born 4 November 1985) is a Japanese former tennis player.

Miyamura won four singles titles and 20 doubles titles on the ITF Women's Circuit in her career. On 21 April 2014, she reached her best singles ranking of world No. 310. On 21 October 2013, she peaked at No. 110 in the doubles rankings.

In April 2013, Miyamura won her biggest doubles titles, partnering Varatchaya Wongteanchai at the 2013 ITF Wenshan, a $50k event.

== ITF Circuit finals ==
=== Singles: 7 (4 titles, 3 runner-ups) ===
Legend $25,000 tournaments $10,000 tournaments	Finals by surface Hard (3–1) Clay (1–2)

Result	No.	Date	Tier	Tournament	Surface	Opponent	Score
Loss	1.	Apr 2006	10,000	ITF Chennai, India	Clay	(Thailand) Nudnida Luangnam	3–6, 0–6
Loss	2.	Aug 2006	10,000	ITF Tokyo, Japan	Hard	(Japan) Kanae Hisami	4–6, 2–6
Loss	3.	May 2008	10,000	ITF Thiruvananthapuram, India	Clay	(India) Isha Lakhani	7–6^{(2)}, 2–6, 4–6
Win	1.	Jun 2008	10,000	ITF Sutama, Japan	Clay	(Japan) Maki Arai	6–3, 6–3
Win	2.	Oct 2009	10,000	ITF Pune, India	Hard	(France) Élodie Rogge-Dietrich	6–3, 6–3
Win	3.	Mar 2015	10,000	ITF Kōfu, Japan	Hard	(Japan) Aiko Yoshitomi	6–4, 6–2
Win	4.	Sep 2016	10,000	ITF Kyoto, Japan	Hard (i)	(Japan) Haruna Arakawa	6–1, 6–4

=== Doubles: 28 (20 titles, 18 runner-ups) ===
Legend $75,000 tournaments $50,000 tournaments $25,000 tournaments $15,000 tournaments $10,000 tournaments	Finals by surface Hard (13–8) Clay (3–2) Grass (2–3) Carpet (2–5)

Result	No.	Date	Tier	Tournament	Surface	Partner	Opponents	Score
Win	1.	28 August 2006	10,000	ITF Saitama, Japan	Hard	(South Korea) Cho Eun-hye	(Japan) Reina Ishihara (Japan) Kana Okawa	6–1, 1–6, 7–6^{(6)}
Win	2.	31 March 2008	10,000	ITF Obregón, Mexico	Hard	(United States) Anne Yelsey	(Brazil) Ana Clara Duarte (Brazil) Fernanda Hermenegildo	6–0, 6–1
Win	3.	5 May 2008	10,000	ITF Thiruvananthapuram, India	Clay	(South Korea) Yu Min-hwa	(Georgia (country)) Magda Okruashvili (India) Poojashree Venkatesha	7–6^{(6)}, 6–2
Win	4.	9 June 2008	10,000	ITF Tokyo, Japan	Hard	(Japan) Maya Kato	(China) Liu Wanting (China) Zhao Yijing	6–4, 6–2
Loss	1.	28 July 2008	25,000	ITF Obihiro, Japan	Carpet	(Japan) Tomoyo Takagishi	(Japan) Mari Tanaka (Japan) Shiho Hisamatsu	4–6, 2–6
Loss	2.	13 October 2008	25,000	ITF Mount Gambier, Australia	Hard	(Japan) Yurika Sema	(South Africa) Natalie Grandin (United States) Robin Stephenson	4–6, 2–6
Loss	3.	23 March 2009	10,000	ITF Kōfu, Japan	Hard	(Japan) Maki Arai	(Japan) Shuko Aoyama (Japan) Akari Inoue	5–7, 6–3, [8–10]
Win	5.	14 September 2009	10,000	ITF New Delhi, India	Hard	(Japan) Moe Kawatoko	(South Korea) Chae Kyung-yee (South Korea) Shin Jung-yoon	2–6, 6–2, [10–6]
Win	6.	21 September 2009	10,000	ITF Dehradun, India	Hard	(Japan) Moe Kawatoko	(Israel) Keren Shlomo (India) Poojashree Venkatesha	6–1, 6–3
Win	7.	5 October 2009	10,000	ITF Noida, India	Hard	(Japan) Moe Kawatoko	(India) Sanaa Bhambri (India) Poojashree Venkatesha	6–1, 4–6, [10–5]
Win	8.	12 October 2009	10,000	ITF Pune, India	Hard	(Japan) Moe Kawatoko	(India) Sanaa Bhambri (India) Rushmi Chakravarthi	6–0, 6–3
Win	9.	19 April 2010	10,000	ITF Mie, Japan	Carpet	(Japan) Yurina Koshino	(Japan) Miyabi Inoue (Japan) Aiko Yoshitomi	6–4, 7–6^{(7)}
Win	10.	26 April 2010	25,000	ITF Ipswich, Australia	Clay	(Japan) Moe Kawatoko	(Australia) Isabella Holland (Australia) Sally Peers	6–4, 4–6, [10–5]
Loss	4.	2 August 2010	10,000	ITF Niigata, Japan	Carpet	(Japan) Ayumi Oka	(Japan) Akari Inoue (Japan) Kotomi Takahata	1–6, 4–6
Loss	5.	17 January 2011	25,000	ITF Muzaffarnagar, India	Grass	(Japan) Mari Tanaka	(India) Rushmi Chakravarthi (India) Poojashree Venkatesha	6–3, 4–6, [12–14]
Loss	6.	28 March 2011	25,000	ITF Ipswich, Australia	Clay	(Japan) Mari Tanaka	(Australia) Casey Dellacqua (Australia) Olivia Rogowska	4–6, 4–6
Win	11.	20 June 2011	10,000	ITF Tarakan, Indonesia	Hard (i)	(Japan) Moe Kawatoko	(Indonesia) Jessy Rompies (Indonesia) Grace Sari Ysidora	6–2, 7–5
Loss	7.	16 July 2012	25,000	Challenger de Granby, Canada	Hard	(Japan) Shuko Aoyama	(Canada) Sharon Fichman (Canada) Marie-Ève Pelletier	6–4, 5–7, [4–10]
Loss	8.	6 August 2012	50,000	Bronx Open, United States	Hard	(Japan) Eri Hozumi	(Japan) Shuko Aoyama (Japan) Erika Sema	4–6, 6–7^{(4)}
Loss	9.	3 September 2012	25,000	ITF Noto, Japan	Grass	(Japan) Mari Tanaka	(Japan) Kumiko Iijima (Japan) Akiko Yonemura	1–6, 6–4, [5–10]
Win	12.	22 October 2012	25,000	ITF Hamamatsu, Japan	Grass	(Japan) Shuko Aoyama	(Australia) Monique Adamczak (United States) Alexa Glatch	3–6, 6–4, [10–6]
Loss	10.	19 November 2012	75,000+H	Toyota World Challenge, Japan	Carpet (i)	(Thailand) Varatchaya Wongteanchai	(Australia) Ashleigh Barty (Australia) Casey Dellacqua	1–6, 2–6
Loss	11.	25 March 2013	25,000	ITF Bundaberg, Australia	Clay	(Thailand) Varatchaya Wongteanchai	(South Korea) Jang Su-jeong (South Korea) Lee So-ra	6–7^{(4)}, 6–4, [8–10]
Win	13.	22 April 2013	50,000	ITF Wenshan, China	Hard	(Thailand) Varatchaya Wongteanchai	(Japan) Rika Fujiwara (Japan) Junri Namigata	7–5, 6–3
Loss	12.	20 May 2013	25,000	ITF Karuizawa, Japan	Grass	(Japan) Erika Takao	(Japan) Shiho Akita (Japan) Sachie Ishizu	5–7, 6–7^{(80)}
Loss	13.	8 July 2013	75,000	Beijing Challenger, China	Hard	(Japan) Misaki Doi	(China) Liu Chang (China) Zhou Yimiao	6–7^{(1)}, 4–6
Win	14.	9 September 2013	25,000	ITF Incheon, South Korea	Hard	(Japan) Akiko Omae	(Thailand) Nicha Lertpitaksinchai (Thailand) Peangtarn Plipuech	6–4, 6–7^{(6)}, [11–9]
Loss	14.	27 January 2014	50,000	Burnie International, Australia	Hard	(Japan) Eri Hozumi	(Australia) Jarmila Gajdošová (Australia) Storm Sanders	4–6, 4–6
Win	15.	17 February 2014	15,000	ITF Salisbury, Australia	Hard	(Japan) Misa Eguchi	(South Korea) Jang Su-jeong (South Korea) Lee So-ra	6–2, 6–2
Loss	15.	1 September 2014	25,000	ITF Noto, Japan	Carpet	(Japan) Chihiro Nunome	(Japan) Miyabi Inoue (Japan) Riko Sawayanagi	3–6, 6–7^{(2)}
Win	16.	13 October 2014	25,000	ITF Makinohara, Japan	Grass	(Germany) Tatjana Maria	(Japan) Makoto Ninomiya (Japan) Mari Tanaka	6–3, 6–1
Win	17.	20 October 2014	25,000	ITF Hamamatsu, Japan	Carpet	(Germany) Tatjana Maria	(Japan) Makoto Ninomiya (Japan) Mari Tanaka	5–7, 6–2, [10–5]
Loss	16.	15 December 2014	25,000	ITF Navi Mumbai, India	Hard	(Japan) Miyabi Inoue	(Greece) Despina Papamichail (Serbia) Nina Stojanović	6–7^{(5)}, 2–6
Win	18.	2 February 2015	10,000	ITF Antalya, Turkey	Clay	(Japan) Aiko Yoshitomi	(Hungary) Vanda Lukács (Hungary) Rebeka Stolmár	6–1, 7–6^{(4)}
Win	19.	7 September 2015	10,000	ITF Kyoto, Japan	Hard (i)	(Japan) Akari Inoue	(Chinese Taipei) Hsu Ching-wen (Chinese Taipei) Lee Pei-chi	6–3, 6–0
Loss	17.	22 August 2016	25,000	ITF Tsukuba, Japan	Hard	(Japan) Shiho Akita	(China) Lu Jiajing (Japan) Akiko Omae	3–6, 6–4, [6–10]
Loss	18.	29 August 2016	25,000	ITF Noto, Japan	Carpet	(Japan) Akari Inoue	(Japan) Rika Fujiwara (Japan) Ayaka Okuno	4–6, 6–1, [6–10]
Win	20.	5 September 2016	10,000	ITF Kyoto, Japan	Hard (i)	(Japan) Rika Fujiwara	(Japan) Risa Hasegawa (Japan) Midori Yamamoto	6–1, 6–2
