= Kanae Hisami =

Japanese tennis player (born 1987)

Kanae Hisami 久見 香奈恵
- Country (sports): Japan
- Residence: Japan
- Born: 28 January 1987 (age 38); Kyoto, Japan
- Plays: Right (two-handed backhand)
- Prize money: $87,605

Singles
- Career record: 227–184
- Career titles: 3 ITF
- Highest ranking: No. 393 (7 November 2011)

Doubles
- Career record: 146–125
- Career titles: 1 WTA 125, 10 ITF
- Highest ranking: No. 139 (10 October 2016)

Kanae Hisami (久見 香奈恵, Hisami Kanae, born 12 October 1987) is a former professional tennis player from Japan, mainly competing on the ITF Women's Circuit.

On 7 November 2011, she reached her highest singles ranking by the Women's Tennis Association (WTA) of 393. On 10 October 2016, she peaked at No. 139 of the WTA doubles rankings.

== WTA Challenger finals ==
=== Doubles: 1 (title) ===
Result	Date	Tournament	Surface	Partner	Opponents	Score
Win	Nov 2015	Taipei Open, Taiwan	Carpet (i)	(Japan) Kotomi Takahata	(Russia) Marina Melnikova (Belgium) Elise Mertens	6–1, 6–2

== ITF Circuit finals ==
=== Singles: 5 (3–2) ===
Legend $25,000 tournaments $10,000 tournaments	Finals by surface Hard (2–1) Carpet (1–1)

Result	No.	Date	Tournament	Surface	Opponent	Score
Win	1.	6 June 2005	ITF Tokyo, Japan	Hard	(Japan) Mari Tanaka	6–3, 6–3
Loss	1.	18 September 2005	ITF Hiroshima, Japan	Carpet	(Japan) Tomoyo Takagishi	3–6, 6–7^{(4)}
Win	2.	14 August 2006	ITF Tokyo, Japan	Hard	(Japan) Miki Miyamura	6–4, 6–2
Win	3.	20 March 2011	ITF Miyazaki, Japan	Carpet	(Japan) Emi Mutaguchi	6–3, 6–1
Loss	2.	9 January 2013	ITF Taipei, Taiwan	Hard	(Chinese Taipei) Lee Ya-hsuan	7–6^{(6)}, 2–6, 4–6

=== Doubles: 21 (10–11) ===
Legend $100,000 tournaments $75,000 tournaments $50,000 tournaments $25,000 tournaments $10,000 tournaments	Finals by surface Hard (6–5) Clay (0–2) Grass (2–3) Carpet (2–1)

Result	No.	Date	Tournament	Surface	Partner	Opponents	Score
Win	1.	25 October 2008	ITF Hamanako, Japan	Carpet	(Japan) Yurina Koshino	(Japan) Junri Namigata (Japan) Akiko Yonemura	7–5, 6–4
Loss	1.	20 November 2010	ITF Hyogo, Japan	Carpet	(Japan) Yurina Koshino	(Japan) Chinami Ogi (Japan) Shiho Otake	5–7, 2–6
Win	2.	21 February 2011	ITF Mumbai, India	Hard	(China) Li Ting	(South Korea) Han Sung-hee (Thailand) Varatchaya Wongteanchai	6–1, 7–5
Win	3.	19 June 2011	ITF Balikpapan, Indonesia	Hard	(Thailand) Varatchaya Wongteanchai	(Japan) Yurika Sema (Japan) Natsumi Hamamura	6–3, 6–2
Win	4.	11 September 2011	ITF Nato, Japan	Carpet	(Thailand) Varatchaya Wongteanchai	(Japan) Ayumi Oka (Japan) Natsumi Hamamura	1–6, 7–6^{(4)}, [14–12]
Loss	2.	18 March 2012	ITF Miyazaki, Japan	Grass	(Japan) Yumi Miyazaki	(Japan) Hiroko Kuwata (Japan) Akari Inoue	3–6, 0–6
Win	5.	25 February 2013	Kurume Cup, Japan	Grass	(Japan) Mari Tanaka	(Japan) Rika Fujiwara (Japan) Akiko Omae	6–4, 7–6
Loss	3.	15 July 2013	ITF Woking, United Kingdom	Hard	(Japan) Mari Tanaka	(United Kingdom) Tara Moore (Russia) Marta Sirotkina	6–4, 1–6, [7–10]
Win	6.	22 July 2013	ITF Wrexham, UK	Hard	(Japan) Mari Tanaka	(United Kingdom) Melanie South (United Kingdom) Anna Smith	6–3, 7–6
Loss	4.	19 May 2014	ITF Karuizawa, Japan	Grass	(Japan) Chiaki Okadaue	(Japan) Junri Namigata (Japan) Akiko Yonemura	2–6, 5–7
Loss	5.	29 March 2015	ITF Nishitama, Japan	Hard	(Japan) Kotomi Takahata	(Japan) Kyōka Okamura (Japan) Akiko Yonemura	6–2, 2–6, [5–10]
Win	7.	1 June 2015	ITF Ariake, Japan	Hard	(Japan) Kotomi Takahata	(United States) Yuki Kristina Chiang (Japan) Nozomi Fujioka	6–4, 6–4
Loss	6.	6 July 2015	ITF Bangkok, Thailand	Hard	(Japan) Kotomi Takahata	(China) Han Xinyun (China) Zhang Kailin	3–6, 4–6
Loss	7.	18 July 2015	ITF Bangkok, Thailand	Hard	(Japan) Kotomi Takahata	(Japan) Akiko Omae (Japan) Erika Sema	6–4, 3–6, [9–11]
Win	8.	17 October 2015	ITF Makinohara, Japan	Grass	(Japan) Kotomi Takahata	(Japan) Yukina Saigo (United States) Ena Shibahara	6–4, 6–1
Loss	8.	24 October 2015	ITF Hamamatsu, Japan	Grass	(Japan) Kotomi Takahata	(Japan) Mana Ayukawa (Japan) Makoto Ninomiya	6–0, 3–6, [4–10]
Loss	9.	20 March 2016	Clay Court International, Australia	Clay	(Thailand) Varatchaya Wongteanchai	(Australia) Ashleigh Barty (Australia) Arina Rodionova	4–6, 2–6
Loss	10.	2 April 2016	Kōfu International Open, Japan	Hard	(Japan) Kotomi Takahata	(Japan) Shuko Aoyama (Japan) Erina Hayashi	5–7, 5–7
Win	9.	12 June 2016	ITF Tokyo, Japan	Hard	(Japan) Kotomi Takahata	(Australia) Lizette Cabrera (Japan) Miharu Imanishi	6–1, 6–4
Loss	11.	10 July 2016	Reinert Open, Germany	Clay	(Japan) Kotomi Takahata	(Russia) Natela Dzalamidze (Ukraine) Valeriya Strakhova	2–6, 1–6
Win	10.	2 October 2016	ITF Iizuka, Japan	Hard	(Japan) Kotomi Takahata	(Japan) Miharu Imanishi (Japan) Akiko Omae	6–2, 3–6, [10–4]
