= Miharu Imanishi =

Japanese tennis player (born 1992)

Miharu Imanishi 今西 美晴
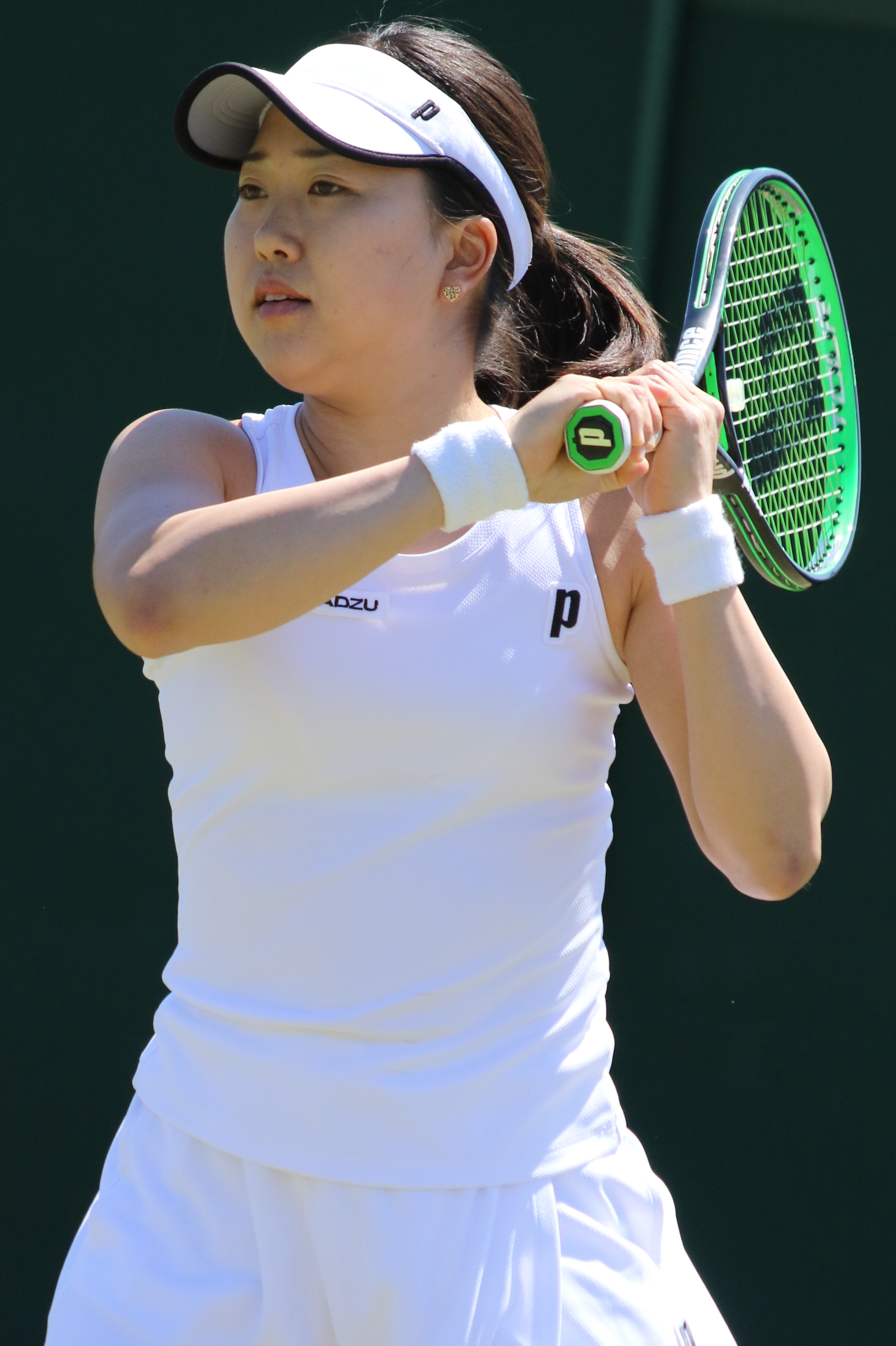
- Imanishi at the 2018 Wimbledon qualifying
- Country (sports): Japan
- Born: 20 May 1992 (age 34) Kyoto, Japan
- Height: 1.62 m (5 ft 4 in)
- Turned pro: 2013
- Retired: 2022
- Plays: Right (two-handed backhand)
- Prize money: $211,252

Singles
- Career record: 288–242
- Career titles: 6 ITF
- Highest ranking: No. 187 (28 May 2018)

Doubles
- Career record: 93–113
- Career titles: 6 ITF
- Highest ranking: No. 251 (9 September 2019)

Miharu Imanishi (今西 美晴, Imanishi Miharu; born 20 May 1992) is a former tennis player from Japan.

On 28 May 2018, she reached her highest WTA singles ranking of 187. On 9 September 2019, she peaked at No. 251 in the doubles rankings. In her career, she won six singles and six doubles titles on the ITF Women's Circuit.

Imanishi made her WTA Tour main-draw debut at the 2014 Japan Women's Open, in the singles event.

== Grand Slam singles performance timeline ==
Key
W	F	SF	QF	#R	RR	Q#	DNQ	A	NH

(W) winner; (F) finalist; (SF) semifinalist; (QF) quarterfinalist; (#R) rounds 4, 3, 2, 1; (RR) round-robin stage; (Q#) qualification round; (DNQ) did not qualify; (A) absent; (NH) not held; (SR) strike rate (events won / competed); (W–L) win–loss record.
To avoid confusion and double counting, these charts are updated at the conclusion of a tournament or when the player's participation has ended.

Tournament	2014	2015	2016	2017	2018	...	2022	W–L
Australian Open	A	Q1	A	A	Q2		A	0–0
French Open	A	A	A	A	Q1			0–0
Wimbledon	A	A	A	A	Q1		A	0–0
US Open	Q1	A	Q1	A	A		A	0–0
Win–loss	0–0	0–0	0–0	0–0	0–0		0–0	0–0

== ITF Circuit finals ==
Legend
$25,000 tournaments
$10/15,000 tournaments

=== Singles: 7 (6 titles, 1 runner-up) ===
Result	W–L	Date	Tournament	Tier	Surface	Opponent	Score
Win	1–0	Jun 2011	ITF Mie, Japan	10k	Carpet	(Japan) Riko Sawayanagi	6–4, 6–3
Win	2–0	Jun 2013	ITF Bukhara, Uzbekistan	25k	Hard	(Uzbekistan) Nigina Abduraimova	7–5, 7–5
Win	3–0	Jul 2014	Challenger de Granby, Canada	25k	Hard	(France) Stéphanie Foretz	6–4, 6–4
Win	4–0	Jul 2017	ITF Auburn, United States	25k	Hard	(United States) Nicole Gibbs	6–3, 6–2
Win	5–0	Feb 2019	ITF Jodhpur, India	W25	Hard	(United Kingdom) Jodie Burrage	6–3, 3–6, 6–3
Win	6–0	Jun 2021	ITF Monastir, Tunisia	W15	Hard	(United States) Jenna De Falco	6–0, 6–4
Loss	6–1	Feb 2022	ITF Cancún, Mexico	W15	Hard	(France) Julie Belgraver	6–1, 3–6, 5–7

=== Doubles: 12 (6 titles, 6 runner-ups) ===
Result	W–L	Date	Tournament	Tier	Surface	Partner	Opponents	Score
Loss	0–1	Jun 2016	ITF Tokyo, Japan	25k	Hard	(Australia) Lizette Cabrera	(Japan) Kanae Hisami (Japan) Kotomi Takahata	1–6, 4–6
Loss	0–2	Oct 2016	ITF Iizuka, Japan	25k	Hard	(Japan) Akiko Omae	(Japan) Kanae Hisami (Japan) Kotomi Takahata	2–6, 6–3, [4–10]
Loss	0–3	Aug 2017	ITF Fort Worth, US	25k	Hard	(Japan) Ayaka Okuno	(Mexico) Giuliana Olmos (Australia) Ellen Perez	4–6, 3–6
Win	1–3	Aug 2017	ITF Tsukuba, Japan	25k	Hard	(Japan) Akiko Omae	(Australia) Naiktha Bains (Chinese Taipei) Hsu Chieh-yu	6–4, 6–4
Win	2–3	Sep 2017	ITF Nanao, Japan	25k	Carpet	(Chinese Taipei) Hsu Chieh-yu	(Japan) Akari Inoue (Japan) Miyabi Inoue	7–6^{(7)}, 6–2
Win	3–3	Oct 2018	ITF Hamamatsu, Japan	25k	Carpet	(Japan) Erina Hayashi	(Japan) Momoko Kobori (Japan) Ayano Shimizu	7–5, 6–4
Loss	3–4	Aug 2019	ITF Nanao, Japan	W25	Carpet	(Japan) Erina Hayashi	(Japan) Kanako Morisaki (Japan) Minori Yonehara	1–6, 3–6
Loss	3–5	Feb 2021	ITF Sharm El Sheikh, Egypt	W15	Hard	(Lithuania) Justina Mikulskytė	(Czech Republic) Kristýna Lavičková (Czech Republic) Anna Sisková	6–7^{(0)}, 4–6
Win	4–5	Jun 2021	ITF Monastir, Tunisia	W15	Hard	(Japan) Haine Ogata	(United States) Dalayna Hewitt (United States) Kariann Pierre-Louis	7–5, 7–6^{(0)}
Win	5–5	Jan 2022	ITF Cancún, Mexico	W15	Hard	(Japan) Haine Ogata	(France) Julie Belgraver (France) Jade Bornay	6–2, 6–3
Loss	5–6	May 2022	ITF Villach, Austria	W25	Clay	(Japan) Kanako Morisaki	(Croatia) Lea Bošković (Slovenia) Veronika Erjavec	6–3, 3–6, [9–11]
Win	6–6	May 2022	ITF Annenheim, Austria	W15	Clay	(Japan) Kanako Morisaki	(Switzerland) Sebastianna Scilipoti (Slovakia) Ingrid Vojčináková	6–2, 6–4
