= 1996 Fed Cup Asia/Oceania Zone Group I – Knockout Stage =

Final stage of Zonal Competition involving teams from Asia and Oceania

The Knockout Stage of the 1996 Fed Cup Asia/Oceania Zone Group I was the final stage of the Zonal Competition involving teams from Asia and Oceania. Those that qualified for this stage placed first and second in their respective pools.

Placing	Pool A	Pool B
1	South Korea	China
2	India	Thailand
3	Hong Kong	Kazakhstan
4	Malaysia	Philippines

The four teams were then randomly drawn into a two-stage knockout tournament, with the winner advancing to the World Group II Play-offs.

== Draw ==
Semifinals; 23 February
South Korea	3
Thailand	0
India	0
China	3

Final; 24 February
South Korea	2
China	1

=== Semifinals ===
==== South Korea vs. Thailand ====
South Korea
3
700 Years Anniversary Complex, Chiang Mai, Thailand
23 February 1996
Hard (outdoors)

Thailand
0

			1	2	3
1	(South Korea) (Thailand)	Kim Eun-ha; Sawitre Naree	6; 1	6; 0
2	(South Korea) (Thailand)	Park Sung-hee; Phorhathai Suksamran	6; 2	6; 3
3	(South Korea) (Thailand)	Choi Ju-yeon / Kim Eun-ha; Busrin Boontemleaw / Sawitre Naree	6; 1	6; 1

==== India vs. China ====
India
0
700 Years Anniversary Complex, Chiang Mai, Thailand
23 February 1996
Hard (outdoors)

China
3

			1	2	3
1	(India) (China)	Manisha Malhotra; Chen Jingjing	4; 6	1; 6
2	(India) (China)	Nirupama Vaidyanathan; Li Li	6; 3	4; 6	2; 6
3	(India) (China)	Manisha Malhotra / Arati Ponnappa; Chen Jingjing / Li Ting	3; 6	3; 6

=== Final ===
==== South Korea vs. China ====
South Korea
2
700 Years Anniversary Complex, Chiang Mai, Thailand
24 February 1996
Hard (outdoors)

China
1

			1	2	3
1	(South Korea) (China)	Kim Eun-ha; Chen Jingjing	6; 3	7^{7} 6^{4}
2	(South Korea) (China)	Park Sung-hee; Li Li	2; 6	5; 7
3	(South Korea) (China)	Choi Ju-yeon / Kim Eun-ha; Chen Jingjing / Li Li	1; 6	6; 2	6; 3

- South Korea advanced to the World Group II Play-offs, where they were drawn against Bulgaria. They won 4–1, and thus advanced to the 1997 World Group II.

== See also ==
- Fed Cup structure
