= 1996 Fed Cup Asia/Oceania Zone Group I – Pool B =

International tennis competition

Group A of the 1996 Fed Cup Asia/Oceania Zone Group I was one of two pools in the Asia/Oceania Zone Group I of the 1996 Fed Cup. Four teams competed in a round robin competition, with the top two teams advancing to the knockout stage and the bottom team being relegated down to Group II for 1997.

	(China) CHN	(Thailand) THA	(Kazakhstan) KAZ	(Philippines) PHI	RR; W–L	Set; W–L	Game; W–L	Standings
China		3–0	3–0	3–0	3–0	18–0	108–22	1
Thailand	0–3		2–0	3–0	2–1	10–6	69–71	2
Kazakhstan	0–3	0–2		2–1	1–2	4–12	56–80	3
Philippines	0–3	0–3	1–2		0–3	2–16	45–104	4

== China vs. Philippines ==
China
3
700 Years Anniversary Complex, Chiang Mai, Thailand
21 February 1996
Hard (outdoors)

Philippines
0

			1	2	3
1	(China) (Philippines)	Chen Jingjing; Cristina Bengzon	6; 0	6; 0
2	(China) (Philippines)	Li Li; Marisue Jacutin	6; 2	6; 2
3	(China) (Philippines)	Li Li / Wen Yuan; Cristina Bengzon / Marisue Jacutin	6; 1	6; 1

== Thailand vs. Kazakhstan ==
Thailand
3
700 Years Anniversary Complex, Chiang Mai, Thailand
21 February 1996
Hard (outdoors)

Kazakhstan
0

			1	2	3
1	(Thailand) (Kazakhstan)	Busrin Boontemleaw; Alissa Velts	7^{8} 6^{6}	6; 3
2	(Thailand) (Kazakhstan)	Phorhathai Suksamran; Tatiana Babina	6; 4	6; 2
3	(Thailand) (Kazakhstan)					not played

== China vs. Kazakhstan ==
China
3
700 Years Anniversary Complex, Chiang Mai, Thailand
22 February 1996
Hard (outdoors)

Kazakhstan
0

			1	2	3
1	(China) (Kazakhstan)	Li Ting; Alissa Velts	6; 2	6; 3
2	(China) (Kazakhstan)	Li Li; Tatiana Babina	6; 3	6; 2
3	(China) (Kazakhstan)	Chen Jingjing / Li Li; Evgenia Tarasova / Alissa Velts	6; 0	6; 0

== China vs. Thailand ==
China
3
700 Years Anniversary Complex, Chiang Mai, Thailand
22 February 1996
Hard (outdoors)

Thailand
0

			1	2	3
1	(China) (Thailand)	Chen Jingjing; Busrin Boontemleaw	6; 0	6; 2
2	(China) (Thailand)	Li Li; Phorhathai Suksamran	6; 1	6; 0
3	(China) (Thailand)	Chen Jingjing / Wen Yuan; Busrin Boontemleaw / Sawitre Naree	6; 3	6; 0

== Thailand vs. Philippines ==
Thailand
3
700 Years Anniversary Complex, Chiang Mai, Thailand
22 February 1996
Hard (outdoors)

Philippines
0

			1	2	3
1	(Thailand) (Philippines)	Busrin Boontemleaw; Cristina Bengzon	6; 3	6; 3
2	(Thailand) (Philippines)	Phorhathai Suksamran; Marisue Jacutin	6; 2	7; 5
3	(Thailand) (Philippines)	Busrin Boontemleaw / Sawitre Naree; Cristina Bengzon / Marisue Jacutin	6; 3	6; 4

== Kazakhstan vs. Philippines ==
Kazakhstan
2
700 Years Anniversary Complex, Chiang Mai, Thailand
22 February 1996
Hard (outdoors)

Philippines
1

			1	2	3
1	(Kazakhstan) (Philippines)	Alissa Velts; Cristina Bengzon	6; 0	6; 2
2	(Kazakhstan) (Philippines)	Tatiana Babina; Marisue Jacutin	1; 6	6^{6} 7^{8}
3	(Kazakhstan) (Philippines)	Tatiana Babina / Alissa Velts; Cristina Bengzon / Marisue Jacutin	6; 1	6; 3

- Philippines placed last in the pool, and thus was relegated to Group II in 1997, where they achieved advancement back into Group I for 1998.

== See also ==
- Fed Cup structure
