= 1996 Fed Cup Asia/Oceania Zone Group I – Pool A =

Group A of the 1996 Fed Cup Asia/Oceania Zone Group I was one of two pools in the Asia/Oceania Zone Group I of the 1996 Fed Cup. Four teams competed in a round robin competition, with the top two teams advancing to the knockout stage and the bottom team being relegated down to Group II for 1997.

	(South Korea) KOR	(India) IND	(Hong Kong) HKG	(Malaysia) MAS	RR; W–L	Set; W–L	Game; W–L	Standings
South Korea		3–0	3–0	3–0	3–0	18–0	109–36	1
India	0–3		2–1	3–0	2–1	10–9	82–72	2
Hong Kong	0–3	1–2		3–0	1–2	9–10	74–90	3
Malaysia	0–3	0–3	0–3		0–3	0–18	43–110	4

== South Korea vs. India ==
South Korea
3
700 Years Anniversary Complex, Chiang Mai, Thailand
22 February 1996
Hard (outdoors)

India
0

			1	2	3
1	(South Korea) (India)	Kim Eun-ha; Manisha Malhotra	6; 4	6; 1
2	(South Korea) (India)	Park Sung-hee; Nirupama Vaidyanathan	6; 2	6; 4
3	(South Korea) (India)	Choi Ju-yeon / Kim Eun-ha; Sai Jayalakshmy Jayaram / Arati Ponnappa	6; 0	6; 1

== South Korea vs. Hong Kong ==
South Korea
3
700 Years Anniversary Complex, Chiang Mai, Thailand
22 February 1996
Hard (outdoors)

Hong Kong
0

			1	2	3
1	(South Korea) (Hong Kong)	Jeon Mi-ra; Fu Yun-Ning	6; 2	6; 1
2	(South Korea) (Hong Kong)	Park Sung-hee; Chan Lee	6; 4	6; 4
3	(South Korea) (Hong Kong)	Choi Ju-yeon / Kim Eun-ha; Fu Yun-Ning / Tong Ka-po	6; 1	6; 1

== South Korea vs. Malaysia ==
South Korea
3
700 Years Anniversary Complex, Chiang Mai, Thailand
22 February 1996
Hard (outdoors)

Malaysia
0

			1	2	3
1	(South Korea) (Malaysia)	Kim Eun-ha; Tan Lynn-Yin	6; 0	6; 0
2	(South Korea) (Malaysia)	Choi Ju-yeon; Khoo Chin-bee	6; 1	7^{10} 6^{8}
3	(South Korea) (Malaysia)	Choi Ju-yeon / Kim Eun-ha; Khoo Chin-bee / Tan Lynn-Yin	6; 2	6; 2

== India vs. Hong Kong ==
India
3
700 Years Anniversary Complex, Chiang Mai, Thailand
22 February 1996
Hard (outdoors)

Hong Kong
0

			1	2	3
1	(India) (Hong Kong)	Manisha Malhotra; Fu Yun-Ning	6; 0	6; 1
2	(India) (Hong Kong)	Nirupama Vaidyanathan; Chan Lee	6; 2	4; 6	6; 3
3	(India) (Hong Kong)	Sai Jayalakshmy Jayaram / Arati Ponnappa; Fu Yun-Ning / Tong Ka-po	4; 6	2; 6

== India vs. Malaysia ==
India
3
700 Years Anniversary Complex, Chiang Mai, Thailand
22 February 1996
Hard (outdoors)

Malaysia
0

			1	2	3
1	(India) (Malaysia)	Manisha Malhotra; Tan Lynn-Yin	6; 2	6; 2
2	(India) (Malaysia)	Nirupama Vaidyanathan; Khoo Chin-bee	6; 1	6; 2
3	(India) (Malaysia)	Sai Jayalakshmy Jayaram / Arati Ponnappa; Ling Si-Yiah / Tan Lynn-Yin	6; 2	6; 3

== Hong Kong vs. Malaysia ==
Hong Kong
3
700 Years Anniversary Complex, Chiang Mai, Thailand
22 February 1996
Hard (outdoors)

Malaysia
0

			1	2	3
1	(Hong Kong) (Malaysia)	Fu Yun-Ning; Tan Lynn-Yin	6; 4	7; 5
2	(Hong Kong) (Malaysia)	Chan Lee; Khoo Chin-bee	6; 2	6; 3
3	(Hong Kong) (Malaysia)	Chan Lee / Tong Ka-po; Khoo Chin-bee / Tan Lynn-Yin	6; 4	6; 2

- Malaysia placed last in the pool, and thus was relegated to Group II in 1997, where they placed third overall.

== See also ==
- Fed Cup structure
