= List of China Fed Cup team representatives =

This is a list of tennis players who have represented the China Fed Cup team in an official Fed Cup match. China have taken part in the competition since 1981.

== Players ==
Player	W-L (Total)	W-L (Singles)	W-L (Doubles)	Ties	Debut
Bi Ying	3 – 2	1 – 1	2 – 1	4	1993
Chen Jingjing	6 – 2	3 – 1	3 – 1	5	1996
Chen Li-Ling	7 – 14	4 – 10	3 – 4	17	1989
Chen Yan	4 – 1	0 – 1	4 – 0	4	1997
Ding Ding	2 – 2	2 – 1	0 – 1	3	1999
Duan Li-Lan	4 – 5	1 – 2	3 – 3	7	1984
Duan Yingying	0 – 1	-	0 – 1	1	2017
Gong Qing-Qing	0 – 1	-	0 – 1	1	1983
Han Xinyun	2 – 1	1 – 1	1 – 0	2	2010
Hao Jie	3 – 1	2 – 1	1 – 0	4	2004
Hua Wei	1 – 2	-	1 – 2	3	1988
Ji Chunmei	1 – 0	-	1 – 0	1	2007
Li Fang	20 – 13	11 – 4	9 – 9	25	1989
Li Li	17 – 4	9 – 1	8 – 3	13	1995
Li Na	35 – 10	27 – 4	8 – 6	31	1999
Li Ting	15 – 6	3 – 0	12 – 6	21	1996
Li Xinyi	7 – 8	4 – 3	3 – 5	13	1981
Li Yan-Ling	0 – 1	-	0 – 1	1	1989
Liang Chen	3 – 2	-	3 – 2	5	2012
Lin Ya-Ming	1 – 0	1 – 0	-	1	1999
Liu Fangzhou	1 – 3	1 – 2	0 – 1	3	2014
Liu Nannan	4 – 0	3 – 0	1 – 0	4	2002
Liu Wanting	0 – 1	-	0 – 1	1	2012
Liu Wei-Juan	0 – 2	0 – 2	-	2	2004
Lu Jingjing	3 – 4	1 – 2	2 – 2	4	2010
Hu Na	5 – 2	2 – 0	3 – 2	5	1981
Peng Shuai	14 – 8	10 – 5	4 – 3	15	2001
Pu Xin-Fen	2 – 4	-	2 – 4	6	1985
Sun Shengnan	1 – 1	-	1 – 1	2	2007
Sun Tiantian	16 – 10	8 – 6	8 – 4	19	2001
Sun Yan	1 – 1	1 – 1	-	2	1987
Tang Haochen	7 – 7	4 – 3	3 – 4	8	2011
Tang Min	14 – 13	8 – 7	6 – 6	17	1988
Tian Ran	0 – 3	0 – 1	0 – 2	2	2011
Wang Ping	3 – 8	3 – 6	0 – 2	9	1981
Wang Qiang	14 – 10	12 – 6	2 – 4	17	2012
Wang Yafan	8 – 2	3 – 2	5 – 0	8	2016
Wen Yuan	5 – 0	2 – 0	3 – 0	5	1996
Weng Qin-Di	0 – 3	-	0 – 3	3	1985
Xiang Zhen-Zhen	0 – 1	-	0 – 1	1	1983
Yan Zi	4 – 6	1 – 4	3 – 2	7	2002
Yang Li-Hua	1 – 3	0 – 2	1 – 1	4	1988
Yang Shujing	4 – 2	2 – 1	2 – 1	4	2004
Yang Zhaoxuan	6 – 2	2 – 1	4 – 1	8	2017
Yi Jing-Qian	27 – 9	16 – 6	11 – 3	25	1991
Yu Li-Qiao	5 – 7	5 – 4	0 – 3	9	1981
Yu Ying	3 – 1	-	3 – 1	4	2004
Zhang Kailin	4 – 1	2 – 1	2 – 0	4	2017
Zhang Shuai	6 – 8	2 – 7	4 – 1	11	2007
Zheng Jie	22 – 9	16 – 7	6 – 2	25	2002
Zheng Saisai	4 – 4	3 – 2	1 – 2	6	2015
Zhong Ni	6 – 8	5 – 5	1 – 3	11	1984
Zhou Yimiao	4 – 2	2 – 1	2 – 1	5	2010
Zhu Lin	4 – 3	4 – 3	-	7	2017
Zhu Xiao-Yu	0 – 1	-	0 – 1	1	1984
Zhu Yu-Yu	0 – 2	0 – 2	-	2	1988
