= Saori Obata =

Japanese tennis player (born 1978)

Saori Obata 小畑沙織
- Country (sports): Japan
- Residence: Tokyo
- Born: 23 April 1978 (age 48) Tokyo
- Height: 1.65 m (5 ft 5 in)
- Turned pro: April 1996
- Retired: June 2006
- Plays: Left (two-handed backhand)
- Prize money: $652,031

Singles
- Career record: 281–222
- Career titles: 0 WTA, 6 ITF
- Highest ranking: No. 39 (9 February 2004)

Grand Slam singles results
- Australian Open: 3R (2004)
- French Open: 1R (2002, 2003, 2004)
- Wimbledon: 2R (2002, 2004)
- US Open: 3R (2003)

Doubles
- Career record: 118–102
- Career titles: 1 WTA, 2 ITF
- Highest ranking: No. 98 (9 February 2004)

Grand Slam doubles results
- Australian Open: 2R (2004)
- Wimbledon: 1R (2003, 2005)
- US Open: 1R (2003)

Saori Obata (Japanese: 小畑沙織, Obata Saori; born 23 April 1978) is a former tennis player from Japan. She turned professional in April 1996, and in February 2004, she achieved a career-high singles ranking of 39, and on the same day, she reached her best doubles ranking of 98.

== Biography ==
She did not win a singles title on WTA Tour in her career, however did reach one final in Tashkent in 2003 where she lost in two sets to Virginia Ruano Pascual. In the same year, she reached the semifinals of the WTA Tour event in Bali, Indonesia, before losing to Chanda Rubin.

== Tennis career ==
=== Early years ===
Having had moderate success on the ITF Junior Circuit – reaching a career high ranking of 55 – Obata made her WTA Tour-level professional debut in 1996, at the age of 18, at the Tier IV event at Surabaya, where she lost to Hila Rosen in qualifying, in straight sets. However, she subsequently qualified for Tier IV events in Beijing and Pattaya, and played a number of Asian WTA Tour events in the subsequent two years. However, her first big breakthrough tournament came in 2000, when she reached the quarterfinals of the Tier IV tournament in Shanghai as a qualifier, with wins over Lilia Osterloh and Yuka Yoshida, before falling to Meghann Shaughnessy. She ended 2000 ranked inside the top 200, at No. 161.

=== 2001 ===
Her first full season of regular tour-level tennis started at the Tier V tournament in Hobart, where she qualified for the main draw, before losing to Anna Smashnova in two close sets. She then attempted to qualify for the Australian Open, beating Alena Vašková and Angelika Rösch, before falling in the final qualifying round to Laurence Andretto in three sets.

Obata then had a breakthrough tournament in the highest-tier Pan Pacific Open in Tokyo, winning through qualifying by beating top seed Kristie Boogert, wildcard Kumiko Iijima and Janette Husárová. She then beat fellow qualifier Katarina Srebotnik in the first round, before finally falling to third seed Anna Kournikova in a close three-setter.

She struggled in the next three tournaments, losing in the first round in Acapulco, Indian Wells and Key Biscayne, before dropping back down to ITF-level at the $25k event in Stone Mountain. As seventh seed, she won one round against wildcard Erin Burdette before losing to Marion Maruska. In Japan's Fed Cup tie against Argentina, Obata played two singles matches – losing in straight sets to María Emilia Salerni, before beating Clarisa Fernández by retirement.

Saori returned to winning ways in May, participating in two Japanese $50k events. In Gifu, she beat Christina Wheeler, compatriot Akiko Morigami and Annabel Ellwood before losing to second seed Alicia Molik in three sets in the semifinals. She then reached the final of Fukuoka, beating Bryanne Stewart, Haruka Inoue, Adriana Barna, and Lenka Dlhopolcova, before losing again to Molik in the final, in straight sets.

She lost in straight sets in the second round of qualifying at the French Open to Canadian Marie-Ève Pelletier.

The grass-court season saw her struggle to win consistently, reaching the second round of the $25k event in Surbiton with a win over Brit Lucie Ahl before a third successive loss to Molik, while at the Birmingham Classic she beat Dragana Zarić in qualifying before losing to Eleni Daniilidou. She entered the main draw as a lucky loser, but lost in straight sets to 15th seed Anne-Gaëlle Sidot. At Wimbledon, she again reached the final round of qualifying by beating two British wildcards, Alice Barnes and Helen Crook, before again losing in straight sets to Daniilidou.

In the North American hardcourt swing, Obata again struggled to string wins together. She lost early in qualifying for San Diego to Jennifer Hopkins, before an impressive win over Anastasia Myskina in the opening qualifying round of the Tier II event at Manhattan Beach Open Tennis Tournament, before falling to Alexandra Stevenson. She then moved on to the $50k Bronx Open, again defeating Boogert in the opening round before losing to Martina Müller. As the qualifying 16th seed at the US Open, she beat Mashona Washington in the opening round before exiting to Samantha Reeves.

After a first round exit at the Tier IV event in Waikoloa to Lisa Raymond, Obata received a wildcard into the Toyota Princess Cup in Tokyo, beating qualifier Shiho Hisamatsu in the opening round. She then lost to fourth seed Sandrine Testud, in three sets. She got another wildcard into the Japan Open, beating Alexandra Fusai and Marlene Weingärtner, before losing heavily to second seed Tamarine Tanasugarn in the quarter-finals. In the Tier IV event in Shanghai, she lost to Monica Seles in the second round having dispatched a young Li Na in the opener.

A further second-round loss in Pattaya saw Obata decide to finish the season at challenger level with two $25k tournaments in Port Pirie and Nuriootpa, South Australia. As the top seed, she won the tournament in Port Pirie, beating Yuliya Beygelzimer, Amanda Grahame, Christina Wheeler, Jaslyn Hewitt and Pavlina Nola. She also won, as second seed, her final tournament of the year in Nuriootpa, beating qualifier Anouk Sterk, Samantha Stosur, Wheeler again, Bryanne Stewart, and Cho Yoon-jeong in the final.

These two tournament wins meant Obata finished the year ranked just outside the top 100 at 116, but had cracked the top 100 for the first time during the year at 94.

=== 2002 ===
Obata started the year with a warm-up tournament in Australia in Canberra, where she qualified for the main draw, defeating Miho Saeki, Maureen Drake and Lucie Ahl, before falling in the opening round to Anna Smashnova, 1–6, 3–6. She then made her debut in the main draw of a Grand Slam tournament at the Australian Open as a direct entrant. She lost in straight sets to Maria Elena Camerin.

She then qualified for the Tier I Pan Pacific Open in Tokyo, beating Jill Craybas, Jennifer Hopkins and Alicia Molik to reach the main draw. She then fell in straight sets to the seventh seed Elena Dementieva. Obata then entered the Tier III event in Memphis, but lost 6–7(6), 4–6 in the first round to Japanese number one, Ai Sugiyama. She then lost to Evelyn Fauth in the opening round of a $50k event in Minneapolis. Obata then played singles and doubles matches in the Fed Cup Asia–Oceania Group B, winning three of her four matches to help seal promotion to the World Group.

After an early loss in Miami, Obata dropped down to challenger level to gain some confidence and wins. She reached the quarter finals of the $25k event in Lawrenceville as top seed, by defeating Laura Granville and Dessislava Topalova, before a defeat to qualifier Teryn Ashley. She then lost to Ashley again in a $50k event at Naples in the first round.

Obata then went back to Japan to play two more Challenger events in Gifu and Fukuoka. She defeated Hannah Collin and Ayami Takase to reach the quarterfinals of the former – losing to Jeon Mi-ra – and reached the second round in the latter with another win over Takase, before close three-set loss to Nana Miyagi. At Roland Garros, where she made her main draw debut, Obata lost 6–0, 2–6, 0–6 to Alina Jidkova.

The grass-court season started badly for Obata, with first-round losses in the Surbiton challenger to Tara Snyder, and in the first round in Birmingham to Dája Bedáňová. Despite a win over Stéphanie Foretz Gacon in the first round of Eastbourne qualifying, she fell to a surprising defeat to Wynne Prakusya in the next round. However, she achieved her first main draw Grand Slam win at Wimbledon with a comprehensive 6–1, 6–3 over former semifinalist Alexandra Stevenson. She lost 2–6, 2–6 to Eleni Daniilidou in the second round.

After her Slam breakthrough, Obata followed up by reaching the final of the $50k event in Louisville, before losing to top seed Alina Jidkova. However, she then lost in the first round of the next $50k event in Lexington to Lindsay Lee-Waters. She qualified for the Tier I event in Montreal, defeating Marie-Gaïané Mikaelian and Jidkova, before losing to Anna Kournikova in straight sets. Her final US Open warm-up event was in New Haven, where she lost in straight sets in the first round of qualifying to Émilie Loit. In the US Open main draw, she was drawn against 12th seed Elena Dementieva, but lost 2–6, 4–6.

Obata then moved on to the Asian swing for her final tournaments of 2002, but lost to Sugiyama in the first round of the Tier IV event in Shanghai, and in three sets to Patricia Wartusch in the opening round of the Toyota Princess Cup. She got back to winning ways in the Tier III event in Bali, with straight sets wins over Jill Craybas and Emmanuelle Gagliardi, before a three-set loss to Arantxa Sánchez Vicario in the quarterfinals. She finished her year with two straight sets, first-round losses at the Japan Open to Jelena Kostanić Tošić and in Pattaya to Adriana Serra Zanetti.

She ended the year ranked just outside the top 100 at 108.

=== 2003 ===
Obata started the year with by qualifying for the Tier V WTA event in Canberra, defeating Claudine Schaul, top seed Dally Randriantefy and Tatiana Poutchek to reach the main draw. She then defeated Virginia Ruano Pascual in the first round, before losing to unseeded Italian Adriana Serra Zanetti. She then failed to qualify for the Australian Open main draw, losing in the final round of qualifying to María Emilia Salerni, in straight sets.

After the Australian Open, she lost in the first round of the Pan Pacific Open to Magdalena Maleeva, before gaining revenge against Adriana Serra Zanetti for her Canberra defeat in the opening round of the Hyderabad Open, in straight sets. She then lost to fifth seed Iroda Tulyaganova. Obata then reached the quarterfinals of the Memphis Tier III tournament, defeating Canadian Vanessa Webb and fourth seed Alexandra Stevenson, before losing to Cho Yoon-jeong. It was at this tournament that she won her sole WTA Tour doubles title, together with Akiko Morigami. After withdrawing from Scottsdale before playing, she lost in qualifying at the Indian Wells Open to 11th seed Maureen Drake, after defeating Olga Barabanschikova in the opening round. She then lost in qualifying at tournaments in Key Biscayne, Sarasota and Charleston.

Obata played two singles matches in Japan's Fed Cup Asia-Oceania qualifying group matches against New Zealand and Hong Kong, winning both her singles matches.

Saori then had two very successful ITF events in Japan, reaching the final of the $50k grass-court event in Gifu as second seed, defeating Julie Pullin, Tomoko Yonemura, Maria Elena Camerin, and Rika Fujiwara, before losing to top seed and rival Shinobu Asagoe. She then, as top seed. won the $50k tournament in Fukuoka on carpet, defeating Seiko Okamoto, Nana Miyagi, Jarmila Gajdošová, Zi Yan and then Maria Elena Camerin in the final.

At the French Open, she lost in the first round to American Ashley Harkleroad 6–4, 6–2.

She made a further breakthrough in the grass-court season. Despite first-round losses at the Surbiton Trophy and Birmingham Classic tournaments, she won through qualifying at the Tier II Eastbourne tournament. She then achieved a notable scalp in the opening round, when she defeated Jelena Dokić in straight sets when Dokić was ranked 11th in the world. She then lost in a final-set tiebreak in the second round to Anna Smashnova. She then made her debut appearance on No. 1 Court at Wimbledon in the first round, where she held three match points against 21st seed Elena Bovina before losing 6–7(5), 6–2, 6–8.

The North American hardcourt season brought mixed fortunes – with Obata reaching the main draw at San Diego (as a lucky loser) but losing to Lina Krasnoroutskaya, before winning a round as a wildcard in Los Angeles against Virginie Razzano, before losing to compatriot and fourth seed Ai Sugiyama. At the Tier I tournament in Toronto, Obata qualified and defeated compatriot Shinobu Asagoe in the first round, before falling to seventh seed Amanda Coetzer. Her final tournament before the US Open was at New Haven, where she lost in the final round in qualifying, but was selected as a lucky loser. She lost to former Wimbledon champion Conchita Martínez.

However, she subsequently achieved her best Grand Slam performance to date, reaching the US Open third round, defeating qualifier Sun Tiantian 6–2, 7–5 in the first round, and then overcoming Marie-Gaïané Mikaelian 7–5, 6–4 in the second. She was then defeated 6–1, 6–2 by second seed Justine Henin.

After her US Open success, Obata saw her best success to date in WTA tournaments as a singles player. She reached the semifinals of the Tier III tournament in Bali, defeating Ashley Harkleroad, Barbara Schett and Angelique Widjaja, before finally falling to Chanda Rubin in straight sets. After losing in the first round of the Japan Open to Jill Craybas, she then reached her only WTA singles final at Tashkent Open. She achieved wins against Tatiana Poutchek, Zheng Jie, Jelena Kostanić Tošić and Emmanuelle Gagliardi. She faced Virginia Ruano Pascual in the final, but fell short 2–6, 6–7(2).

She ended her season at the Tier V tournament in Pattaya, winning two rounds before falling to Slovak Ľubomíra Kurhajcová, ensuring her highest-ever year-end ranking of 49.

=== 2004 ===
Following her most successful season to date, Obata entered Canberra again as her first tournament of 2004, but suffered a disappointing loss (3–6, 0–6) to Zuzana Ondrášková.

However, she made another breakthrough at the Australian Open, reaching the third round. After edging out Swiss player Myriam Casanova in the opening round in three sets, she achieved the best ranking win of her career when she defeated Ai Sugiyama, in the second round, when ranked No. 55. This was her only win over a top-ten player as Sugiyama was ranked No. 9 at the time. She lost in straight sets in the third round to Nathalie Dechy. As a result, her ranking reached its career high of 39, and she would be Japanese No. 2 behind Sugiyama.

She followed up her Australian Open success with a win at the Tier I Pan Pacific Open, over Julia Vakulenko, before exiting with a spirited performance against Venus Williams in the second round. Shortly after this tournament, Obata achieved her career-high ranking of 39.

Obata struggled in the next few tournaments, never gaining more than one win over the next six tournaments before the French Open, including three first round losses. This included a 0–6, 0–6 loss to qualifier Ana Ivanovic in the second round of the Fukuoka International. She then had another first-round exit at the French Open, losing in three sets to Vera Dushevina.

After disappointment over the clay season, Obata recovered some form during the grass season. She won three matches at Birmingham, over Camerin, Kelly McCain and Shenay Perry, before falling in the quarter final to Patty Schnyder. She followed this up with two qualifying wins at Eastbourne, before losing to Elena Likhovtseva. She then got her first ever main draw win at Wimbledon, edging out Eva Birnerová 7–5 in the final set. She lost 1–6, 4–6 in the second round to 12th seed Vera Zvonareva.

After Wimbledon, Obata then experienced the least successful period of her career – not winning another match in 2004. She retired from her Fed Cup singles match against Dessislava Topalova of Bulgaria, then lost in first rounds at the remaining nine tournaments she played, including her first and only appearance representing Japan in the Olympics, where she was shocked by Maja Matevžič, who had been plagued by an elbow injury for most of the previous year. Matevzic subsequently lost 0–6, 0–6 to Venus Williams in the next round.

Obata's run of losses were:

- Los Angeles, Lilia Osterloh-Q – 7–5, 7–5
- San Diego, María Sánchez Lorenzo – 4–6, 7–5, 7–5
- Montreal, Jelena Janković – 7–6(3), 6–4
- Olympic Games, Maja Matevžič – 7–6(3), 7–5
- US Open, Shikha Uberoi-Q – 6–3, 3–6, 7–5
- Bali, Kristina Brandi – 6–1, 6–2
- Beijing, Anabel Medina Garrigues – 7–5, 6–1
- Seoul, Yuka Yoshida – 5–7, 6–3, 2–0 ret
- Japan Open, Rika Fujiwara-WC – 6–4, 6–4

This run meant Obata dropped to a year-end ranking outside the top 100, at 107.

=== 2005 ===
Following her disastrous end to 2004, Obata played qualifying in her usual Australian warm-up tournament in Canberra. She extended her losing streak to 12 in all competitions, losing in three sets to Maret Ani. Her streak then extended to 13 with a first-round loss in the Australian Open in straight sets to Mariana Díaz Oliva.

Obata finally ended her losing run with a win over wild card Miho Saeki at the Pan Pacific Open in Tokyo, earning a second round meeting with top seed Lindsay Davenport, where she put in a creditable performance in a 3–6, 4–6 loss.

Having seen her ranking drop yet further, Obata entered the $50k event at Saint Paul, Minnesota, winning more than one match in a tournament for the first time in nearly nine months. After defeating Teryn Ashley, Simona Matei and Sandra Klösel, she exited in the semifinal to Laura Granville. She then lost easily in first round of qualifying for Indian Wells to Shikha Uberoi, before deciding to drop back down to the ITF Circuit.

In the $50k tournament in Orange, California, she failed to qualify – losing to Lenka Němečková 2–6, 0–6 in the final round. She then fell to a disappointing loss in the second round of the $25k event in Redding, California, falling in a final set tiebreak to Julie Ditty.

Despite her relatively poor results and subdued ranking, Obata hit a rich vein of form in two challenger in events in Augusta, Georgia, and Gifu. The $25k event in Augusta saw her win the title as sixth seed, without dropping a set. She defeated compatriot Seiko Okamoto in the first round 6–2, 6–4, then overcame Ivana Lisjak 6–2, 6–1. In the quarterfinals, she eased past Varvara Lepchenko 6–2, 6–2 and then won a closer match against Anastasia Rodionova, winning out 7–6(5), 6–1. In the final, Obata overcame a young Victoria Azarenka with ease, winning 6–2, 6–2.

In the $50k event in Gifu, Obata was seeded fourth and again won the title. In the first four rounds, she didn't drop a set – defeating Casey Dellacqua 6–1, 6–1, then New Zealand qualifier Marina Erakovic 6–2, 6–4, before winning against fellow Japanese player Ayumi Morita 6–0, 6–4. Obata then reached her second successive final with a 6–4, 6–3 win over top seed Aiko Nakamura. She dropped her only set of the week in the final against countrywoman Shiho Hisamatsu, but won her second title in a row.

Despite her improved form, Obata lost in the first round of qualifying (as 23rd seed) on the clay of Roland Garros, defeated by Maria Fernanda Alves 4–6, 6–2, 6–3.

Going on to grass, Saori lost a tight opening round at the $25k event in Surbiton to South African qualifier Surina De Beer, losing in three sets. But she picked up a couple of wins to make the main draw of the Tier III event in Birmingham, beating wildcard Katie O'Brien in the first qualifying round, and then beat Sofia Arvidsson in three sets to qualify. She then lost a tight three-set match to María Vento-Kabchi in the opening round, losing 5–7 in the final set. At Wimbledon, Obata beat Hana Šromová, Jessica Kirkland and Eva Birnerová to reach the main draw, before losing to American Marissa Irvin in round one.

With a ranking still too low to reach the main draw of the US Open, Obata went into the North American hard court swing needing wins to make it into the top 100. At the Tier I event at San Diego, she beat Varvara Lepchenko and Alexandra Stevenson to reach the main draw but lost a tough three-set match to Gisela Dulko in the opening round. She then lost in the final round of qualifying of the Los Angeles Tier II event, but lost to Kateryna Bondarenko. She made the main draw as a lucky loser, but lost to qualifier Tathiana Garbin. In the final warm-up tournament before the US Open, she beat Tatiana Panova in the first round of qualifying for the Tier I event in Toronto, but lost to Lucie Šafářová in the final qualifying round. Obata then rounded off a disappointing North American swing with a loss in the first round of qualifying at the US Open to sixth seed Hana Šromová whom she had beaten two months previously at the same stage of Wimbledon.

Obata started the Asian swing with a disappointing loss in the second round of qualifying in the Tier II tournament in Beijing, before making it through three rounds of qualifying in Seoul. She then beat María Vento-Kabchi in the first round, before going out to eighth seed Marion Bartoli. She then received a wildcard into the Tier III Japan Open, and won her opening round against Martina Suchá, before losing 1–6, 4–6 to third seed Tatiana Golovin. She moved on to the Tier III event in Bangkok, winning through qualifying with wins over Carly Gullickson, Natalie Grandin and top seed Shenay Perry. She also won her opening round against Mashona Washington 6–2, 6–3, before falling to top seed Nadia Petrova 3–6, 2–6. Obata then suffered a disappointing first-round loss as top seed to Kim Jin-hee in the first round of the $50k event in Busan. Her final Asian event of the year was in Shenzhen for a $50k event, where she reached the semifinals, beating Sisi Qiu, Sun Shengnan and Tomoko Yonemura before losing to Tamarine Tanasugarn in straight sets. Her final event of the year, in December, was a first round loss in the $50k event in Palm Beach Gardens to Alisa Kleybanova.

After a mixed year, Obata ended the year ranked 108 – placing her on the cusp of automatic entry to the Australian Open.

=== 2006 ===
Obata's ranking was enough to give her entry to the main draw of the Australian Open, and she started her year with her regular warm-up tournament in Canberra. As third seed in qualifying, she suffered a surprising loss to Tatiana Poutchek, 4–6, 4–6 in the opening round. At the Australian Open, she lost a three set match to 17th seed to Daniela Hantuchová. This would prove to be her final Grand Slam match.

Saori entered qualifying for the Tier I event at the Pan Pacific Open, where she'd had success before. She beat wildcards Angelique Widjaja (6–2, 6–2) and Brenda Schultz-McCarthy (6–3, 7–5), before sealing qualification by beating Shiho Hisamatsu 6-2, 6–2. In the main draw, she easily defeated Květa Peschke 6–2, 6–1 in the opening round, before losing 4–6, 4–6 to fifth seed Nicole Vaidišová. This tournament meant she re-entered the top 100 rankings at 99. Obata then moved on to the Tier IV event in Pattaya where she lost in the first round of qualifying to Hsieh Su-wei.

In March, Saori entered the $75k event in Las Vegas where, as sixth seed, she defeated Varvara Lepchenko in the opening round, before a 6–3, 6–2 over Swede Hanna Nooni. This would be her final win on tour, as she fell to Angela Haynes in the quarterfinal.

Obata's final tournament and match was at Indian Wells on 19 March, where she was drawn against qualifier Camille Pin and lost 2–6, 2–6.

In late May 2006, Obata confirmed she had retired from tennis due to a foot injury she had picked up at Indian Wells. She said her best memories from tennis were her first Wimbledon and being on the final at Tashkent.

=== Career achievements ===
She won a doubles title at WTA-level (Memphis 2003, with Akiko Morigami), and five ITF-level singles titles. Her final Grand Slam appearance was at the 2006 Australian Open where she lost in the opening round, having qualified, to Daniela Hantuchová in three sets. She retired from professional tennis in June 2006 because of injury.

== WTA Tour finals ==
=== Singles: 1 (runner-up) ===
Result	Date	Tournament	Surface	Opponent	Score
Loss	Oct 2003	Tashkent, Uzbekistan	Hard	(Spain) Virginia Ruano Pascual	2–6, 6–7^{(2–7)}

=== Doubles: 1 (title) ===
Result	Date	Tournament	Surface	Partner	Opponent	Score
Win	Feb 2003	Memphis Cup, US	Hard (i)	(Japan) Akiko Morigami	(Russia) Alina Jidkova; (Australia) Bryanne Stewart	6–1, 6–1

== ITF Circuit finals ==
=== Singles (6–4) ===
Result	No.	Date	Location	Surface	Opponent	Score
Win	1.	7 April 1996	Jakarta, Indonesia	Hard	(South Korea) Choi Young-ja	6–2, 6–2
Loss	2.	25 June 2000	Mont-de-Marsan, France	Clay	(France) Edith Nunes	2–6, 4–6
Loss	3.	13 May 2001	Fukuoka International, Japan	Grass	(Australia) Alicia Molik	5–7, 3–6
Win	4.	18 November 2001	Port Pirie, Australia	Hard	(New Zealand) Pavlina Nola	6–1, 6–2
Win	5.	25 November 2001	Nuriootpa, Australia	Hard	(South Korea) Cho Yoon-jeong	6–4, 6–1
Loss	6.	23 July 2002	Louisville, United States	Hard	(Russia) Alina Jidkova	3–6, 4–6
Loss	7.	5 May 2003	Kangaroo Cup, Japan	Hard	(Japan) Shinobu Asagoe	4–6, 1–6
Win	8.	11 May 2003	Fukuoka International, Japan	Carpet	(Italy) Maria Elena Camerin	2–6, 6–3, 6–3
Win	9.	3 April 2005	Augusta, United States	Hard	(Belarus) Victoria Azarenka	6–2, 6–2
Win	10.	8 May 2005	Kangaroo Cup, Japan	Carpet	(Japan) Shiho Hisamatsu	6–1, 2–6, 6–4

=== Doubles (12–5) ===
Result	No.	Date	Tournament	Surface	Partner	Opponents	Score
Loss	1.	8 January 1996	San Antonio, United States	Hard	(Japan) Nami Urabe	(United States) Pam Nelson (Hungary) Nóra Köves	6–2, 4–6, 1–6
Win	2.	25 March 1996	Bandung, Indonesia	Hard	(Japan) Nami Urabe	(China) Chen Jingjing (China) Li Li	6–3, 6–3
Win	3.	4 May 1997	Kangaroo Cup, Japan	Grass	(Japan) Kaoru Shibata	(Japan) Shinobu Asagoe (Japan) Yasuko Nishimata	6–3, 7–5
Loss	4.	30 June 1997	Mont-de-Marsan, France	Hard	(Japan) Nami Urabe	(Hungary) Katalin Marosi; (Argentina) Veronica Stele	4–6, 3–6
Win	5.	10 October 1997	Saga, Japan	Grass	(Australia) Danielle Jones	(South Africa) Surina De Beer (Japan) Nami Urabe	6–3, 6–4
Loss	6.	16 March 1998	Noda, Japan	Hard	(Japan) Kyōko Nagatsuka	(Japan) Keiko Ishida (Japan) Keiko Nagatomi	6–3, 2–6, 3–6
Win	7.	8 June 1998	Sochi, Russia	Hard	(Japan) Kaoru Shibata	(Georgia (country)) Nino Louarsabishvili (Ukraine) Elena Tatarkova	3–6, 6–4, 6–2
Win	8.	14 May 2000	Seoul, South Korea	Clay	(Japan) Shinobu Asagoe	(China) Li Na (China) Li Ting	6–1, 6–3
Win	9.	28 May 2000	Ho Chi Minh City, Vietnam	Hard	(South Korea) Cho Yoon-jeong	(China) Li Na (China) Li Ting	6–1, 6–2
Win	10.	4 June 2000	Shenzhen, China	Hard	(South Korea) Kim Eun-ha	(China) Li Na (China) Li Ting	6–1, 6–3
Win	11.	26 May 2002	Tallinn, Estonia	Clay	(Japan) Akiko Morigami	(United States) Teryn Ashley (United States) Kristen Schlukebir	7–5, 7–6^{(2)}
Win	12.	27 April 2003	Kangaroo Cup, Japan	Hard	(Japan) Rika Fujiwara	(Japan) Shinobu Asagoe (Japan) Nana Smith	1–6, 7–5, 6–3
Loss	13.	6 May 2003	Fukuoka International, Japan	Grass	(Japan) Rika Fujiwara	(Latvia) Līga Dekmeijere (Japan) Nana Smith	2–6, 6–2, 4–6
Win	14.	9 May 2004	Fukuoka International, Japan	Grass	(Japan) Rika Fujiwara	(Australia) Monique Adamczak (Australia) Nicole Kriz	6–2, 6–4
Loss	15.	3 April 2005	Augusta, United States	Hard	(Japan) Rika Fujiwara	(Australia) Anastasia Rodionova (Belarus) Tatiana Poutchek	6–7^{(3)}, 0–6
Win	16.	8 May 2005	Kangaroo Cup, Japan	Carpet	(Japan) Rika Fujiwara	(Japan) Ryōko Fuda (Japan) Seiko Okamoto	6–1, 6–2
Win	17.	31 May 2005	Surbiton Trophy, England	Grass	(Japan) Rika Fujiwara	(United States) Jennifer Hopkins (United States) Mashona Washington	4–6, 6–4, 6–2
