= Bi Ying =

Chinese tennis player

- Country (sports): China
- Born: 11 February 1970 (age 55)
- Prize money: $6,870

Singles
- Career record: 16–21
- Highest ranking: No. 592 (31 Oct 1994)

Doubles
- Career record: 26–19
- Career titles: 3 ITF
- Highest ranking: No. 202 (31 Oct 1994)

Bi Ying (born 11 February 1970) is a Chinese former professional tennis player.

Bi played on the professional circuit in the 1990s and had a best singles ranking of 592, with the highlight a WTA Tour main draw appearance at the China Open in 1994. As a doubles player she had a career-high ranking of 202 and won three ITF titles. During her career, she represented China at both the Federation Cup and Asian Games.

All of Bi's four Federation Cup ties came in 1993, which included two in the World Group. In the World Group first round against Peru, she won in the singles against Pilar Vásquez, then partnered with Li Fang to win the deciding doubles rubber. Beaten by the United States in the second round, Bi lost in the singles to Lindsay Davenport in straight sets.

At the 1994 Asian Games in Hiroshima, Bi won a bronze medal as an unused substitute in the women's team event.

== ITF finals ==
=== Doubles: 3 (3–0) ===
| Outcome | No. | Date | Tournament | Surface | Partner | Opponents | Score |
|---|---|---|---|---|---|---|---|
| Winner | 1. | 23 May 1994 | Beijing, China | Hard | (China) Li Li | (South Korea) Choi Ju-yeon (South Korea) Choi Young-ja | 7–6, 6–7, 6–4 |
| Winner | 2. | 15 May 1995 | Beijing, China | Hard | (China) Liu Li | (China) Li Yan-Ling (China) Jody Yin | 6–2, 6–3 |
| Winner | 3. | 5 June 1995 | Seoul, South Korea | Hard | (China) Liu Li | (South Korea) Sohn Hyun-hee (South Korea) Shin Hyun-a | 7–5, 6–2 |

== See also ==
- List of China Fed Cup team representatives
