= Trudi Musgrave =

Australian tennis player

- Country (sports): Australia
- Residence: Newcastle, New South Wales
- Born: 10 September 1977 (age 48) Newcastle
- Height: 170 cm (5 ft 7 in)
- Turned pro: 1994
- Retired: 2011
- Plays: Left-handed (two-handed backhand)
- Prize money: $384,221

Singles
- Career record: 262–272
- Career titles: 3 ITF
- Highest ranking: No. 207 (20 December 2006)

Grand Slam singles results
- Australian Open: 1R (1996, 1998, 2004)
- Wimbledon: Q2 (2000)
- US Open: Q2 (1999)

Doubles
- Career record: 406–272
- Career titles: 41 ITF
- Highest ranking: No. 62 (26 May 2003)

Grand Slam doubles results
- Australian Open: 3R (2000)
- French Open: QF (2002)
- Wimbledon: 2R (2002, 2003, 2005)
- US Open: 3R (2003)

Trudi Musgrave (born 10 September 1977) is an Australian former tennis player.

== Biography ==
Musgrave was born in Newcastle, New South Wales. Although she won the Junior Australian Open singles title in 1994 (the same year that Martina Hingis won the French and Wimbledon junior titles), Trudi is a doubles specialist, having been a finalist at the Wimbledon girls' doubles in 1995. Her highest ranking in doubles was 62 (in 2003).

At the peak of her career, in 2004, Trudi suffered a catastrophic knee injury while on the court during a doubles final. Most doctors thought she would not recover. A full knee reconstruction and intense physiotherapy meant that she was able to resume her career at the Australian Open in January 2005. Despite having access to a 'special ranking' that allowed her to enter major tournaments using her ranking at the time of her injury, she was unable to immediately return to the level she was before her injury. However, she has begun to regain some of her momentum and won two ITF doubles titles in 2006 with a 20–10 win–loss record for the year.

Because Trudi is based in Newcastle (a city where there no major tournaments are played), she spends up to 40 weeks a year living out of a suitcase on the circuit. When she is away from home, to make the most of her time she usually plays in a tournament every week with only an occasional rest break. Because of this, most years Trudi has played the most, or has been among those who have played the most tournaments of any of the women on the ITF Circuit in a 12-month period.

Musgrave coached for one year at the Cessnock tennis club in the Hunter Valley, NSW but did not return for the 2009 season. She retired from professional tour 2011.

During her career, she won 41 doubles and three singles titles on the ITF Women's Circuit.

== WTA Tour finals ==
=== Doubles: 1 (runner-up) ===
Legend Grand Slam Tier I Tier II Tier III, IV & V (0–1)	Finals by surface Hard (0–1) Grass (0–0) Clay (0–0) Carpet (0–0)

Result	W-L	Date	Tournament	Surface	Partner	Opponents	Score
Loss	0–1	Sep 2006	Bali Classic, Indonesia	Hard	(South Africa) Natalie Grandin	(United States) Lindsay Davenport (United States) Corina Morariu	3–6, 4–6

== ITF Circuit finals ==
Legend
$50,000 tournaments
$25,000 tournaments
$10,000 tournaments

=== Singles: 9 (3–6) ===
Result	No.	Date	Tournament	Surface	Opponent	Score
Loss	1.	10 July 1995	ITF Felixstowe, United Kingdom	Grass	(Australia) Shannon Peters	6–7, 6–3, 3–6
Loss	2.	22 October 1995	ITF Kugayama, Japan	Hard	(United States) Jane Chi	5–7, 1–6
Loss	3.	14 March 1999	ITF Wodonga, Australia	Grass	(Australia) Kerry-Anne Guse	4–6, 1–6
Win	1.	22 March 1999	ITF Coffs Harbour, Australia	Grass	(Australia) Rochelle Rosenfield	6–1, 6–2
Win	2.	29 March 1999	ITF Wodonga, Australia	Grass	(Australia) Kerry-Anne Guse	6–3, 6–1
Loss	4.	28 November 1999	ITF Nuriootpa, Australia	Hard	(Australia) Rachel McQuillan	4–6, 2–6
Loss	5.	13 October 2003	ITF Mackay, Australia	Hard	(United States) Abigail Spears	2–5 ret.
Win	3.	16 November 2003	ITF Port Pirie, Australia	Hard	(Netherlands) Anousjka van Exel	6–4, 6–0
Loss	6.	11 July 2006	ITF Felixstowe, United Kingdom	Grass	(Russia) Olga Puchkova	2–6, 1–6

=== Doubles: 69 (41–28) ===
Result	No	Date	Tournament	Surface	Partner	Opponents	Score
Win	1.	17 October 1994	ITF Kugayama, Japan	Hard	(Australia) Annabel Ellwood	(South Korea) Kim Il-soon (South Korea) Park In-sook	6–4, 6–0
Win	2.	24 October 1994	ITF Kyoto, Japan	Hard	(Australia) Annabel Ellwood	(China) Chen Jingjing (China) Li Li	4–6, 7–6, 6–3
Win	3.	12 March 1995	ITF Wodonga, Australia	Hard	(Australia) Jane Taylor	(Australia) Gail Biggs (Australia) Nicole Oomens	6–3, 6–2
Loss	1.	5 March 1995	ITF Warrnambool, Australia	Hard	(Australia) Jane Taylor	(Australia) Gail Biggs (Australia) Nicole Oomens	1–6, 5–7
Win	4.	19 March 1995	ITF Canberra, Australia	Hard	(Australia) Jane Taylor	(Australia) Gail Biggs (Australia) Nicole Oomens	6–3, 6–2
Loss	2.	26 March 1995	ITF Bendigo, Australia	Hard	(Australia) Jane Taylor	(Australia) Gail Biggs (Australia) Nicole Oomens	6–7, 5–7
Loss	3.	2 October 1995	ITF Ibaraki, Japan	Hard	(Japan) Nami Urabe	(Japan) Yoshiko Sasano (Japan) Keiko Nagatomi	0–6, 6–7^{(5)}
Win	5.	23 October 1995	ITF Kyoto, Japan	Hard	(Japan) Nami Urabe	(Japan) Tomoe Hotta (Japan) Eiko Toba	3–6, 6–2, 6–3
Win	6.	11 March 1996	ITF Canberra, Australia	Grass	(Australia) Jane Taylor	(Australia) Joanne Limmer (Australia) Lisa McShea	6–4, 5–7, 6–4
Win	7.	25 March 1996	ITF Albury, Australia	Grass	(Australia) Jane Taylor	(Australia) Joanne Limmer (Australia) Lisa McShea	6–0, 6–3
Win	8.	4 April 1997	ITF Corowa, Australia	Grass	(Australia) Jane Taylor	(South Africa) Nannie de Villiers (United Kingdom) Shirli-Ann Siddall	6–4, 4–6, 6–2
Win	9.	14 April 1997	ITF Warwick, Australia	Grass	(Australia) Bryanne Stewart	(Australia) Kylie Moulds (Australia) Sarah Stanley	6–4, 6–0
Win	10.	28 July 1997	Ilkley Trophy, United Kingdom	Grass	(Australia) Cindy Watson	(Australia) Gail Biggs (Russia) Julia Lutrova	6–1, 6–1
Loss	4.	8 September 1997	ITF Fano, Italy	Clay	(Australia) Jenny-Ann Fetch	(Italy) Federica Fortuni (Romania) Andreea Ehritt-Vanc	1–6, 4–6
Win	11.	1 March 1998	ITF Bushey, UK	Carpet (i)	(United Kingdom) Shirli-Ann Siddall	(France) Noëlle van Lottum (Germany) Kirstin Freye	7–6, 4–6, 6–2
Win	12.	10 May 1998	ITF Midlothian, United States	Clay	(United States) Brie Rippner	(Canada) Maureen Drake (Canada) Renata Kolbovic	6–3, 6–3
Win	13.	11 July 1998	ITF Felixstowe, UK	Grass	(Australia) Lisa McShea	(United Kingdom) Lucie Ahl (United Kingdom) Amanda Wainwright	6–4, 7–6^{(4)}
Loss	5.	26 July 1998	ITF Dublin, Ireland	Carpet	(Australia) Lisa McShea	(Germany) Kirstin Freye (Spain) Alicia Ortuño	w/o
Win	14.	11 October 1998	ITF Dalby, Australia	Hard	(Australia) Lisa McShea	(United States) Dawn Buth (Australia) Kylie Hunt	4–6, 7–5, 6–4
Win	15.	18 October 1998	ITF Kooralbyn, Australia	Hard	(Australia) Lisa McShea	(Australia) Gail Biggs (New Zealand) Shelley Stephens	6–3, 7–6^{(5)}
Loss	6.	25 October 1998	ITF Gold Coast, Australia	Hard	(Australia) Lisa McShea	(Australia) Catherine Barclay (Australia) Kerry-Anne Guse	4–6, 2–6
Win	16.	22 November 1998	ITF Port Pirie, Australia	Hard	(Australia) Catherine Barclay	(Australia) Amanda Grahame (Australia) Bryanne Stewart	5–7, 7–5, 6–2
Loss	7.	29 November 1998	ITF Nuriootpa, Australia	Hard	(Australia) Catherine Barclay	(Australia) Danielle Jones (Canada) Vanessa Webb	3–6, 5–7
Loss	8.	22 February 1999	Bendigo International, Australia	Hard	(Australia) Cindy Watson	(Australia) Kerry-Anne Guse (Australia) Lisa McShea	4–6, 1–6
Win	17.	1 March 1999	ITF Warrnambool, Australia	Grass	(Australia) Kerry-Anne Guse	(South Africa) Mareze Joubert (United Kingdom) Kate Warne Holland	6–4, 6–4
Win	18.	7 March 1999	ITF Wodonga, Australia	Grass	(Australia) Kerry-Anne Guse	(South Africa) Natalie Grandin (South Africa) Alicia Pillay	6–3, 6–2
Win	19.	15 March 1999	ITF Albury, Australia	Grass	(Australia) Kerry-Anne Guse	(South Africa) Mareze Joubert (United Kingdom) Kate Warne Holland	7–6, 6–3
Win	20.	22 March 1999	ITF Corowa, Australia	Grass	(Australia) Kerry-Anne Guse	(South Africa) Mareze Joubert (United Kingdom) Kate Warne Holland	6–2, 1–6, 6–3
Win	21.	25 April 1999	ITF Gelos, France	Clay	(Australia) Bryanne Stewart	(France) Sophie Georges (Belarus) Tatiana Poutchek	1–6, 6–4, 6–3
Loss	9.	31 July 1999	ITF Edinburgh, UK	Clay	(United Kingdom) Lorna Woodroffe	(Romania) Magda Mihalache (Hungary) Petra Mandula	6–3, 4–6, 3–6
Loss	10.	24 October 1999	ITF Gold Coast, Australia	Hard	(Japan) Rika Hiraki	(Australia) Kerry-Anne Guse (Australia) Lisa McShea	2–6, 3–6
Win	22.	21 November 1999	Bendigo International, Australia	Hard	(Australia) Rachel McQuillan	(United States) Amanda Augustus (United States) Julie Thu	6–4, 7–5
Loss	11.	28 November 1999	ITF Nuriootpa, Australia	Hard	(Australia) Rachel McQuillan	(Australia) Louise Pleming (Kazakhstan) Irina Selyutina	4–6, 4–6
Loss	12.	28 February 2000	Bendigo International, Australia	Hard	(Australia) Bryanne Stewart	(Australia) Evie Dominikovic (Australia) Amanda Grahame	4–6, 1–6
Win	23.	26 March 2000	ITF Stone Mountain, U.S.	Hard	(Australia) Bryanne Stewart	(Japan) Haruka Inoue (Japan) Maiko Inoue	6–4, 2–6, 7–6
Win	24.	11 June 2000	Surbiton Trophy, UK	Gras	(Australia) Bryanne Stewart	(Italy) Caroline Dhenin (Italy) Francesca Lubiani	3–6, 6–3, 6–1
Win	25.	16 July 2000	ITF Felixstowe, UK	Grass	(Australia) Lorna Woodroffe	(United Kingdom) Lucie Ahl (Russia) Natalia Egorova	6–4, 3–6, 6–4
Win	26.	10 July 2001	ITF Felixstowe, UK	Grass	(United Kingdom) Julie Pullin	(South Africa) Natalie Grandin (South Africa) Kim Grant	7–5, 6–4
Loss	13.	17 July 2000	ITF Valladolid, Spain	Clay	(United Kingdom) Lorna Woodroffe	(Spain) María José Martínez Sánchez (Spain) Alicia Ortuño	2–6, 4–6
Loss	14.	30 July 2000	ITF Dublin, Ireland	Carpet	(United Kingdom) Lorna Woodroffe	(Australia) Catherine Barclay (Netherlands) Andrea van den Hurk	4–6, 5–7
Loss	15.	29 July 2001	ITF Pamplona, Spain	Clay	(United Kingdom) Julie Pullin	(Italy) Giulia Casoni (Italy) Roberta Vinci	6–7^{(2)}, 4–6
Win	27.	5 August 2001	ITF Alghero, Italy	Hard	(United Kingdom) Julie Pullin	(Estonia) Maret Ani (Brazil) Joana Cortez	6–4, 7–5
Loss	16.	16 September 2001	ITF Peachtree, U.S.	Hard	(United Kingdom) Julie Pullin	(United States) Allison Bradshaw (United States) Jennifer Russell	6–7^{(1)}, 2–6
Win	28.	15 October 2001	ITF Cairns, Australia	Hard	(Australia) Lisa McShea	(Netherlands) Mariëlle Hoogland (Slovakia) Zuzana Váleková	6–4, 6–3
Win	29.	28 October 2001	ITF Home Hill, Australia	Hard	(Australia) Lisa McShea	(Australia) Beti Sekulovski (Australia) Nicole Sewell	7–5, 6–4
Win	30.	29 October 2001	ITF Mackay, Australia	Hard	(Australia) Lisa McShea	(Netherlands) Mariëlle Hoogland (Slovakia) Zuzana Váleková	6–2, 6–3
Win	31.	18 November 2001	ITF Port Pirie, Australia	Hard	(Australia) Lisa McShea	(South Korea) Jeon Mi-ra (South Korea) Kim Eun-ha	7–5, 6–4
Loss	17.	25 February 2002	Bendigo International, Australia	Hard	(Australia) Cindy Watson	(Australia) Sarah Stone (Australia) Samantha Stosur	4–6, 3–6
Win	32.	17 November 2002	ITF Port Pirie, Australia	Hard	(United Kingdom) Julie Pullin	(United States) Amanda Augustus (United States) Gabriela Lastra	7–6^{(1)}, 6–2
DNP	–	11 March 2003	ITF Fountain Hills, U.S.	Hard	(Australia) Alicia Molik	(China) Yan Zi (China) Zheng Jie	—N/a
Loss	18.	13 July 2003	ITF Modena, Italy	Clay	(Japan) Rika Fujiwara	(China) Li Ting (China) Sun Tiantian	6–3, 5–7, 5–7
Loss	19.	13 October 2003	ITF Mackay, Australia	Clay	(United States) Abigail Spears	(Australia) Evie Dominikovic (Australia) Bryanne Stewart	w/o
Win	33.	26 October 2003	ITF Rockhampton, Australia	Hard	(United States) Abigail Spears	(United Kingdom) Natalie Grandin (Germany) Martina Müller	6–1, 7–5
Win	34.	16 November 2003	ITF Port Pirie, Australia	Hard	(United States) Abigail Spears	(New Zealand) Ilke Gers (Thailand) Napaporn Tongsalee	6–2, 6–2
Win	35.	23 November 2003	ITF Nuriootpa, Australia	Hard	(Australia) Lisa McShea	(Australia) Bryanne Stewart (Australia) Samantha Stosur	4–6, 6–3, 7–5
Loss	20.	28 February 2004	ITF St. Paul, United States	Hard (i)	(United States) Jessica Lehnhoff	(New Zealand) Leanne Baker (Italy) Francesca Lubiani	7–6^{(3)}, 3–2 ret.
Loss	21.	30 March 2005	GB Pro-Series Bath, UK	Hard (i)	(Russia) Ekaterina Kozhokina	(South Africa) Surina De Beer (United Kingdom) Melanie South	2–6, 5–7
Loss	22.	19 November 2005	ITF Nuriootpa, Australia	Hard	(Australia) Casey Dellacqua	(Hungary) Gréta Arn (Australia) Anastasia Rodionova	4–6, 6–1, 5–7
Loss	23.	21 May 2006	ITF Ho Chi Minh City, Vietnam	Hard	(Latvia) Līga Dekmeijere	(Chinese Taipei) Chuang Chia-jung (Thailand) Napaporn Tongsalee	6–4, 1–6, 0–6
Loss	24.	27 November 2006	ITF Nuriootpa, Australia	Hard	(Australia) Christina Wheeler	(South Africa) Natalie Grandin (United States) Raquel Kops-Jones	2–6, 6–7^{(3)}
Win	36.	4 June 2006	ITF Gunma, Japan	Carpet	(Australia) Christina Horiatopoulos	(Japan) Ryoko Takemura (Japan) Akiko Yonemura	6–1, 5–7, 6–2
Win	37.	9 June 2006	Surbiton Trophy, United Kingdom	Grass	(Australia) Casey Dellacqua	(Thailand) Tamarine Tanasugarn (Chinese Taipei) Hsieh Su-wei	6–3, 6–3
Win	38.	10 July 2006	ITF Felixstowe, UK	Grass	(Australia) Christina Wheeler	(United Kingdom) Sarah Borwell (United Kingdom) Jane O'Donoghue	6–2, 6–4
Win	39.	26 February 2007	Bendigo International, Australia	Hard	(Australia) Casey Dellacqua	(Australia) Beti Sekulovski (Australia) Cindy Watson	6–4, 7–6
Loss	25.	16 March 2007	ITF Perth, Australia	Hard	(Australia) Christina Wheeler	(Australia) Casey Dellacqua (Australia) Emily Hewson	4–6, 6–4, 2–6
Loss	26.	16 November 2007	ITF Nuriootpa, Australia	Hard	(Australia) Sophie Ferguson	(South Africa) Natalie Grandin (United States) Robin Stephenson	4–6, 5–7
Loss	27.	23 November 2007	ITF Mount Gambier, Australia	Hard	(Australia) Sophie Ferguson	(Germany) Antonia Matic (Romania) Monica Niculescu	7–5, 3–6, [8–10]
Win	40.	6 June 2009	ITF Brno, Czech Republic	Clay	(Australia) Sophie Ferguson	(Slovakia) Karin Morgošová (Slovakia) Romana Tabak	6–4, 6–1
Loss	28.	5 March 2010	ITF Sydney, Australia	Hard	(Australia) Sophie Ferguson	(Australia) Casey Dellacqua (Australia) Jessica Moore	w/o
Win	41.	25 June 2010	ITF Rome, Italy	Clay	(Australia) Sophie Ferguson	(Italy) Claudia Giovine (Italy) Valentina Sulpizio	6–0, 6–3
