= Keiko Nagatomi =

Japanese tennis player (born 1974)

- Country (sports): Japan
- Born: 22 November 1974 (age 50)
- Prize money: $56,571

Singles
- Career record: 104–100
- Career titles: 4 ITF
- Highest ranking: No. 271 (12 May 1997)

Doubles
- Career record: 104–63
- Career titles: 12 ITF
- Highest ranking: No. 143 (16 November 1998)

Grand Slam doubles results
- Wimbledon: Q1 (1997)

Keiko Nagatomi (born 22 November 1974) is a Japanese former professional tennis player.

Nagatomi, who had a highest singles ranking of 271, won four ITF titles and had her best WTA Tour performance at the 1999 Tashkent Open, where she made the second round. As a doubles player, she won a further 12 ITF titles and featured in the qualifying draw for the 1997 Wimbledon Championships.

== ITF Circuit finals ==
$25,000 tournaments
$10,000 tournaments

=== Singles: 5 (4 titles, 1 runner-up) ===
Outcome	No.	Date	Tournament	Surface	Opponent	Score
Winner	1.	25 July 1994	ITF Roanoke, United States	Hard	(Puerto Rico) Kristina Brandi	7–6, 6–3
Winner	2.	13 May 1996	ITF Beijing, China	Hard	(China) Wen Yuan	2–6, 6–1, 6–3
Winner	3.	30 September 1996	ITF Ibaraki 1, Japan	Hard	(Japan) Maiko Inoue	6–4, 6–4
Winner	4.	7 October 1996	ITF Ibaraki 2, Japan	Hard	(Australia) Jenny Anne Fetch	6–2, 6–4
Runner-up	1.	21 October 1996	ITF Kyoto, Japan	Hard	(Japan) Shinobu Asagoe	2–6, 4–6

=== Doubles: 15 (12 titles, 3 runner-ups) ===
Outcome	No.	Date	Tournament	Surface	Partner	Opponents	Score
Winner	1.	28 June 1993	ITF Columbia, United States	Hard	(Japan) Mika Todo	(Japan) Yuko Hosoki (Japan) Naoko Kijimuta	7–5, 6–4
Runner-up	1.	11 October 1993	ITF Kuroshio, Japan	Hard	(Japan) Madoka Kuki	(Japan) Keiko Ishida (Japan) Fumiko Yamazaki	2–6, 0–6
Winner	2.	9 May 1994	ITF Bandar Seri Begawan, Brunei	Hard	(Japan) Anori Fukuda	(Indonesia) Irawati Moerid (Thailand) Benjamas Sangaram	7–6^{(5)}, 6–3
Winner	3.	2 October 1995	ITF Ibaraki 1, Japan	Hard	(Japan) Yoshiko Sasano	(Australia) Trudi Musgrave (Japan) Nami Urabe	6–0, 7–6^{(5)}
Winner	4.	9 October 1995	ITF Ibaraki 2, Japan	Hard	(Japan) Yoshiko Sasano	(United States) Jane Chi (United States) Mindy Weiner	6–2, 6–2
Winner	5.	30 September 1996	ITF Ibaraki 1, Japan	Hard	(Japan) Yuka Tanaka	(Japan) Keiko Ishida (Japan) Kiyoko Yazawa	3–6, 6–3, 7–5
Runner-up	2.	13 October 1996	ITF Ibaraki 2, Japan	Hard	(Japan) Yuka Tanaka	(Australia) Gail Biggs (Australia) Lisa McShea	7–5, 3–6, 3–6
Runner-up	3.	20 October 1996	ITF Kugayama, Japan	Hard	(Japan) Kiyoko Yazawa	(Australia) Gail Biggs (Australia) Lisa McShea	0–6, 2–6
Winner	6.	27 October 1996	ITF Kyoto, Japan	Carpet	(Japan) Yuka Tanaka	(Australia) Gail Biggs (Australia) Lisa McShea	7–6^{(4)}, 2–6, 6–2
Winner	7.	17 March 1997	ITF Noda, Japan	Hard	(Japan) Yuko Hosoki	(South Korea) Choi Young-ja (South Korea) Jeon Mi-ra	6–2, 6–2
Winner	8.	3 November 1997	ITF Beijing, China	Hard	(Japan) Keiko Ishida	(China) Chen Jingjing (China) Yi Jing-Qian	7–6^{(4)}, 1–6, 6–3
Winner	9.	16 March 1998	ITF Noda, Japan	Hard	(Japan) Keiko Ishida	(Japan) Kyōko Nagatsuka (Japan) Saori Obata	3–6, 6–2, 6–3
Winner	10.	18 May 1998	ITF Spartanburg, United States	Clay	(Japan) Keiko Ishida	(Canada) Renata Kolbovic (South Africa) Jessica Steck	3–6, 5–7
Winner	11.	25 May 1998	ITF El Paso, United States	Hard	(Japan) Keiko Ishida	(United States) Kaysie Smashey (United States) Sara Walker	6–2, 6–3
Winner	12.	1 June 1998	ITF Little Rock, United States	Hard	(Japan) Keiko Ishida	(China) Li Li (China) Li Ting	7–5, 6–1
