= Tomoe Hotta =

Japanese tennis player (born 1975)

- Country (sports): Japan
- Born: 16 April 1975 (age 50)
- Prize money: $57,662

Singles
- Career record: 123–108
- Career titles: 2 ITF
- Highest ranking: No. 240 (17 August 1998)

Doubles
- Career record: 103–78
- Career titles: 8 ITF
- Highest ranking: No. 175 (3 November 1997)

Tomoe Hotta (born 16 April 1975) is a Japanese former professional tennis player.

Hotta reached a best singles ranking of 240 in the world, with two ITF title wins. She featured in the doubles main draw in three editions of the Japan Open and won eight ITF doubles tournaments.

== ITF finals ==
$25,000 tournaments
$10,000 tournaments

=== Singles: 8 (2–6) ===
Result	No.	Date	Tournament	Surface	Opponent	Score
Loss	1.	14 March 1994	Mexico City, Mexico	Clay	(Chile) Paula Cabezas	3–6, 6–4, 2–6
Loss	2.	16 May 1994	Beijing, China	Hard	(South Korea) Choi Ju-yeon	3–6, 2–6
Win	1.	2 October 1995	Ibaraki, Japan	Hard	(Japan) Haruka Inoue	6–3, 6–3
Loss	3.	27 May 1996	Taipei, Taiwan	Hard	(Japan) Shinobu Asagoe	3–6, 0–6
Loss	4.	3 June 1996	Taichung, Taiwan	Hard	(Japan) Sachie Umehara	3–6, 4–6
Loss	5.	8 July 1996	Amersfoort, Netherlands	Clay	(Czech Republic) Zdeňka Málková	2–6, 3–6
Win	2.	16 June 1997	Rome, Italy	Clay	(Russia) Maria Goloviznina	6–4, 6–4
Loss	6.	21 June 1999	Montreal, Canada	Hard	(Slovenia) Petra Rampre	4–6, 5–7

=== Doubles: 18 (8–10) ===
Result	No.	Date	Tournament	Surface	Partner	Opponents	Score
Win	1.	14 March 1994	Mexico City, Mexico	Clay	(Japan) Rurika Maruse	(United States) Julie Cass (Croatia) Thea Ivanisevic	6–2, 7–6^{(6)}
Loss	1.	23 October 1995	Kyoto, Japan	Hard	(Japan) Eiko Toba	(Japan) Nami Urabe (Australia) Trudi Musgrave	6–3, 2–6, 3–6
Loss	2.	31 March 1996	Albury, Australia	Grass	(Australia) Angie Marik	(South Africa) Nannie de Villiers (Australia) Danielle Jones	6–7, 3–6
Loss	3.	3 June 1996	Taichung, Taiwan	Hard	(Japan) Sachie Umehara	(Japan) Yuka Tanaka (Japan) Shinobu Asagoe	0–6, 1–6
Win	2.	24 June 1996	Orbetello, Italy	Clay	(Japan) Yoriko Yamagishi	(Italy) Cristina Salvi (Romania) Andreea Ehritt-Vanc	3–6, 7–5, 6–2
Win	3.	14 July 1996	Amersfoort, Netherlands	Clay	(Denmark) Sandra Olsen	(Netherlands) Debby Haak (Netherlands) Marielle Bruens	6–3, 6–4
Win	4.	6 April 1997	Bandung 1, Indonesia	Hard	(Japan) Yoriko Yamagishi	(Indonesia) Wynne Prakusya (Indonesia) Eny Sulistyowati	2–6, 7–6, 7–5
Win	5.	23 June 1997	Milan, Italy	Grass	(Japan) Yoriko Yamagishi	(Russia) Anna Linkova (Russia) Maria Goloviznina	6–3, 5–7, 6–4
Loss	4.	21 July 1997	Jakarta, Indonesia	Clay	(Japan) Yoriko Yamagishi	(Chinese Taipei) Hsu Hsueh-li (Chinese Taipei) Wang Shi-ting	4–6, 4–6
Loss	5.	28 July 1997	Bandung 2, Indonesia	Hard	(Japan) Yoriko Yamagishi	(Japan) Keiko Ishida (Thailand) Benjamas Sangaram	2–6, 6–3, 4–6
Loss	6.	23 March 1998	Corowa, Australia	Grass	(Czech Republic) Monika Maštalířová	(Australia) Lisa McShea (Australia) Alicia Molik	0–6, 0–6
Loss	7.	26 April 1998	Shenzhen, China	Hard	(Australia) Gail Biggs	(Australia) Catherine Barclay (South Korea) Kim Eun-ha	3–6, 2–6
Loss	8.	6 July 1998	Fiumicino, Italy	Clay	(Hungary) Adrienn Hegedűs	(Italy) Alessia Lombardi (Romania) Andreea Ehritt-Vanc	2–6, 4–6
Loss	9.	18 July 1998	Getxo, Spain	Clay	(Slovenia) Petra Rampre	(Spain) Lourdes Domínguez Lino (Brazil) Vanessa Menga	6–3, 4–6, 5–7
Loss	10.	15 March 1999	Seoul, South Korea	Clay	(Japan) Hiroko Mochizuki	(South Korea) Young-Ja Choi (South Korea) Kim Eun-sook	4–6, 5–7
Win	6.	21 June 1999	Montreal, Canada	Hard	(Japan) Hiroko Mochizuki	(Australia) Kylie Hunt (Japan) Riei Kawamata	6–2, 6–3
Win	7.	17 July 2000	Baltimore, United States	Hard	(Japan) Ryoko Takemura	(United States) Courtenay Chapman (Chinese Taipei) Weng Tzu-ting	6–3, 6–2
Win	8.	24 July 2000	Evansville, United States	Hard	(Japan) Ryoko Takemura	(Japan) Rika Fujiwara (United States) Anne Plessinger	6–4, 6–1
