= Shannon Peters =

Australian tennis player (born 1969)

- Peters at Sydney International 1995
- Country (sports): Australia
- Residence: Sydney, Australia
- Born: 8 May 1969 (age 57) Sydney
- Turned pro: 1991
- Plays: Right-handed (one-handed backhand)
- Prize money: US$ 31,407

Singles
- Career record: 71–57
- Career titles: 3 ITF
- Highest ranking: 294 (30 January 1995)

Grand Slam singles results
- Australian Open: Q2 (1996)

Doubles
- Career record: 69–51
- Career titles: 5 ITF
- Highest ranking: 186 (28 November 1994)

Shannon Peters (born 8 May 1969) is a former professional Australian tennis player.

She turned professional in 1991 and retired in January 1996. Her career-high WTA singles ranking is 294, which she reached on 30 January 1995. Her highest doubles ranking is 186, set on 28 November 1994.

== ITF finals ==
=== Singles (3–0) ===
$75,000 tournaments
$50,000 tournaments
$25,000 tournaments
$10,000 tournaments

Result	No.	Date	Tournament	Surface	Opponent	Score
Win	1.	7 March 1994	ITF Mildura, Australia	Grass	(Australia) Mireille Dittmann	6–1, 6–2
Win	2.	18 April 1994	ITF Nottingham, United Kingdom	Hard	(Germany) Miriam Schnitzer	6–0, 6–0
Win	3.	10 July 1995	ITF Felixstowe, United Kingdom	Grass	(Australia) Trudi Musgrave	7–6, 3–6, 6–3

=== Doubles (5–5) ===
Result	No.	Date	Tournament	Surface	Partner	Opponents	Score
Loss	1.	28 July 1991	ITF Roanoke, United States	Hard	(United States) Jeri Ingram	(Philippines) Jean Lozano (United States) Stephanie Reece	6–3, 2–6, 3–6
Loss	2.	24 May 1993	ITF Barcelona, Spain	Clay	(Australia) Robyn Mawdsley	(Latvia) Agnese Gustmane (Poland) Katarzyna Teodorowicz	6–7^{(2)}, 2–6
Win	1.	28 June 1993	ITF Ronneby, Sweden	Clay	(Sweden) Catarina Bernstein	(Sweden) Åsa Svensson (Sweden) Marielle Wallin	2–6, 7–6^{(5)}, 7–6^{(5)}
Win	2.	7 March 1994	ITF Mildura, Australia	Grass	(Australia) Nicole Oomens	(Australia) Karen Anderson (Australia) Natalie Frawley	6–3, 6–1
Win	3.	13 March 1994	ITF Warrnambool, Australia	Hard	(Australia) Nicole Oomens	(Australia) Kate McDonald (Australia) Jane Taylor	w/o
Loss	3.	27 March 1994	ITF Bendigo, Australia	Grass	(Australia) Nicole Oomens	(Japan) Atsuko Shintani (Japan) Haruko Shigekawa	6–2, 5–7, 4–6
Win	3.	24 April 1994	ITF Nottingham, United Kingdom	Hard	(Australia) Nicole Oomens	(Namibia) Elizma Nortje (Netherlands) Caroline Stassen	7–5, 6–2
Loss	4.	25 April 1994	ITF Woking, United Kingdom	Hard	(Netherlands) Caroline Stassen	(Australia) Annabel Ellwood (Australia) Lisa McShea	6–3, 4–6, 0–6
Win	5.	10 July 1995	ITF Felixstowe, United Kingdom	Grass	(Australia) Robyn Mawdsley	(United Kingdom) Helen Crook (United Kingdom) Victoria Davies	6–1, 6–1
Loss	5.	17 July 1995	ITF Frinton-on-Sea, United Kingdom	Grass	(Australia) Robyn Mawdsley	(Russia) Natalia Egorova (Russia) Julia Lutrova	6–7^{(2)}, 6–1, 4–6
