= Weng Tzu-ting =

Taiwanese tennis player

- Country (sports): Chinese Taipei
- Born: 1 July 1978 (age 46)
- Height: 1.73 m (5 ft 8 in)
- Retired: 2002
- Prize money: $42,438

Singles
- Career record: 108–118
- Career titles: 3 ITF
- Highest ranking: No. 232 (21 October 1996)

Doubles
- Career record: 73–70
- Career titles: 5 ITF
- Highest ranking: No. 235 (13 November 1995)

Team competitions
- Fed Cup: 8–14
Medal record
Women's tennis
Asian Games
Gold medal – first place	1998 Bangkok	Women's team
Bronze medal – third place	1994 Hiroshima	Women's team
Universiade
Bronze medal – third place	2001 Beijing	Women's doubles

Weng Tzu-ting (Chinese: 翁子婷; born 1 July 1978), also known as Judy Weng, is a Taiwanese former professional tennis player.

== Biography ==
Weng appeared in a total of 19 Fed Cup ties for the Chinese Taipei team and represented her country in several multi-sport competitions. She won a Gold medal at the 1998 Asian Games in the team event. At the 2000 Summer Olympics, she and Janet Lee represented Chinese Taipei in the doubles, where they were beaten in the first round by Ukraine's pairing. They also partnered together at the 2001 Summer Universiade to win a Bronze medal.

On the WTA Tour, Weng had a best singles ranking of No. 232 in the world.

She played her last Fed Cup tie in 2002, which was her final year on tour.

== ITF Circuit finals ==
Legend
$25,000 tournaments
$10,000 tournaments

=== Singles: 4 (3 titles, 1 runner-up) ===
Result	No.	Date	Tournament	Surface	Opponent	Score
Loss	1.	12 September 1993	ITF Taipei, Taiwan	Hard	(South Korea) Jeon Mi-ra	6–1, 3–6, 5–7
Win	2.	17 March 1996	ITF Taipei, Taiwan	Hard	(South Korea) Choi Young-ja	6–1, 3–6, 6–4
Win	3.	12 July 1998	ITF Easton, United States	Hard	(United States) Julie Thu	6–0, 4–6, 7–6
Win	4.	8 July 2001	ITF Kaohsiung, Taiwan	Hard	(Japan) Kaori Aoyama	6–4, 7–5

=== Doubles: 11 (5 titles, 6 runner-ups) ===
Result	No.	Date	Tournament	Surface	Partner	Opponents	Score
Win	1.	16 August 1992	ITF Taipei, Taiwan	Hard	(Chinese Taipei) Lin Ya-hui	(Japan) Nao Akahori (Japan) Keiko Ishida	6–4, 6–1
Win	2.	21 November 1993	ITF Nonthaburi, Thailand	Hard	(Japan) Miho Saeki	(South Korea) Choi Ju-yeon (South Korea) Yoo Kyung-sook	3–6, 6–3, 6–3
Winn	3.	8 August 1994	ITF Jakarta, Indonesia	Hard	(Hong Kong) Tang Min	(Indonesia) Natalia Soetrisno (Indonesia) Suzanna Wibowo	6–3, 6–1
Loss	4.	22 May 1995	ITF Beijing, China	Hard	(Philippines) Francesca La'O	(South Korea) Kim Ih-sook (South Korea) Kim Eun-ha	2–6, 3–6
Loss	5.	11 March 1996	ITF Taipei, Taiwan	Hard	(Chinese Taipei) Hsu Hsueh-li	(Japan) Kazue Takuma (Japan) Yoriko Yamagishi	5–7, 7–6^{(5)}, 6–7^{(4)}
Loss	6.	10 November 1997	ITF Manila, Philippines	Hard	(Malaysia) Khoo Chin-bee	(China) Ding Ding (China) Li Ting	5–7, 3–6
Loss	7.	17 July 2000	ITF Baltimore, United States	Hard	(United States) Courtenay Chapman	(Japan) Tomoe Hotta (Japan) Ryoko Takemura	3–6, 2–6
Loss	8.	8 July 2001	ITF Kaohsiung, Taiwan	Hard	(Malaysia) Khoo Chin-bee	(Japan) Maki Arai (Japan) Kumiko Iijima	w/o
Win	9.	28 October 2001	ITF Manila, Philippines	Hard	(Chinese Taipei) Chuang Chia-jung	(Chinese Taipei) Chao Hsiao-han (Malaysia) Khoo Chin-bee	6–4, 6–4
Win	10.	11 November 2001	ITF Manila, Philippines	Hard	(Chinese Taipei) Chuang Chia-jung	(South Korea) Ha Ji-sun (South Korea) Shin Mi-ran	6–0, 6–3
Loss	11.	25 November 2001	ITF Kofu, Japan	Clay	(Chinese Taipei) Kim Jin-hee	(Japan) Etsuko Kitazaki (Japan) Eriko Mizuno	6–4, 6–7^{(5–7)}, ret.
