= Benjamas Sangaram =

Thai tennis player (born 1975)

- Full name: Benjamas Sangaram
- Country (sports): Thailand
- Born: 11 January 1975 (age 51) Chiang Mai, Thailand
- Height: 164 cm (5 ft 5 in)
- Retired: 2000
- Prize money: $69,223

Singles
- Career record: 92-146
- Career titles: 0 WTA, 1 ITF
- Highest ranking: No. 298 (16 September 1996)

Doubles
- Career record: 122-122
- Career titles: 0 WTA, 9 ITF
- Highest ranking: No. 134 (29 September 1997)

Benjamas Sangaram (born 11 January 1975) is a former professional tennis player from Thailand. She represented Thailand at three Olympic Games, in 1992, 1996 and 2000.

== Biography ==
Born in Chiang Mai, Sangaram first played for the Thailand Fed Cup team as a 16-year old in 1991. She appeared in a total of 21 ties during her Fed Cup career, mostly as a doubles player.

She debuted on the WTA Tour in 1992 at her home event, the Thailand Open, which she competed in regularly throughout her career. Most of her main draw singles appearances were at the Thailand Open but she also made the second round at Surabaya in 1995. It was in doubles that she had the most success, reaching a best ranking of 134 in the world.

Partnering Tamarine Tanasugarn, Sangaram made the women's doubles quarter-finals at both the 1996 and 2000 Summer Olympics. At the 2000 Olympics in Sydney the pair upset Japanese fourth seeds Nana Miyagi and Ai Sugiyama from Japan, then in the quarter-finals held a match point, before losing to eventual silver medalists Kristie Boogert and Miriam Oremans from the Netherlands.

== ITF finals ==
Legend
$50,000 tournaments
$25,000 tournaments
$10,000 tournaments

=== Singles (1–0) ===
Result	No.	Date	Tournament	Surface	Opponent	Score
Win	1.	17 October 1999	Jakarta, Indonesia	Hard	(Japan) Satomi Kinjo	6-4, 6-3

=== Doubles (9–7) ===
Result	No.	Date	Tournament	Surface	Partner	Opponents	Score
Loss	1.	2 September 1991	Bangkok, Thailand	Hard	(Thailand) Suvimol Duangchan	(China) Li Fang (China) Tang Min	4–6, 2–6
Win	2.	15 November 1992	Manila, Philippines	Hard	(Thailand) Suvimol Duangchan	(Philippines) Mia Fernandez (Philippines) Evangelina Olivarez	6–1, 6–3
Win	3.	22 November 1992	Nonthaburi, Thailand	Hard	(Thailand) Suvimol Duangchan	(Japan) Seiko Ichioka (United States) Sandy Sureephong	6-4, 6-7, 6-3
Loss	4.	9 May 1994	Bandar Seri Begawan, Brunei	Hard	(Indonesia) Irawati Iskandar	(Japan) Anori Fukuda (Japan) Keiko Nagatomi	6–7, 3–6
Win	5.	2 April 1995	Jakarta, Indonesia	Hard	(China) Lisa Tang	(Japan) Yuko Hosoki (South Korea) Park In-sook	5-7, 7-5, 6-3
Win	6.	18 September 1995	Samut Prakan, Thailand	Hard	(Thailand) Tamarine Tanasugarn	(Indonesia) Agustine Limanto (Indonesia) Veronica Widyadharma	7-5, 1-6, 6-4
Loss	7.	5 May 1996	Seoul, South Korea	Hard	(South Korea) Choi Young-ja	(Australia) Catherine Barclay (Australia) Kerry-Anne Guse	1-6, 2-6
Loss	8.	2 June 1996	Taipei, Chinese Taipei	Hard	(Chinese Taipei) Julie Huang	(Japan) Miyako Ataka (Japan) Keiko Ishida	6-7, 3-6
Loss	9.	11 August 1996	Tarakan, Indonesia	Hard	(South Korea) Jeon Mi-ra	(Australia) Annabel Ellwood (Australia) Kerry-Anne Guse	3-6, 2-6
Win	10.	17 May 1997	Caboolture, Australia	Clay	(Japan) Shinobu Asagoe	(South Africa) Nannie de Villiers (Australia) Lisa McShea	6–4, 7–5
Win	11.	24 May 1997	Gympie, Australia	Clay	(Japan) Shinobu Asagoe	(South Africa) Nannie de Villiers (Australia) Lisa McShea	5-7, 6-3, 6-3
Loss	12.	31 May 1997	Bundaberg, Australia	Clay	(Japan) Shinobu Asagoe	(South Africa) Nannie de Villiers (Australia) Lisa McShea	6-4, 1-6, 1-6
Loss	13.	7 June 1997	Ipswich, Australia	Clay	(Japan) Shinobu Asagoe	(South Africa) Nannie de Villiers (Australia) Lisa McShea	4-6, 6-3, 5-7
Win	14.	3 August 1997	Bandung, Indonesia	Hard	(Japan) Keiko Ishida	(Japan) Tomoe Hotta (Japan) Yoriko Yamagishi	6-2, 3-6, 6-4
Win	15.	6 April 1998	Dubai, United Arab Emirates	Hard	(Indonesia) Wynne Prakusya	(Hungary) Petra Gáspár (San Marino) Ludmila Varmužová	7–6^{(1)}, 1–6, 6–3
Win	16.	18 October 1999	Jakarta, Indonesia	Hard	(Indonesia) Liza Andriyani	(India) Rushmi Chakravarthi (India) Sai Jayalakshmy Jayaram	6–0, 6–3
