= Suzanna Wibowo =

Indonesian tennis player

- Country (sports): Indonesia
- Born: 25 November 1963 (age 62) Tanjung Pandan, Indonesia
- Turned pro: 1990
- Prize money: $47,687

Singles
- Career record: 60–49
- Career titles: 3 ITF
- Highest ranking: No. 195 (14 January 1991)

Grand Slam singles results
- Australian Open: Q2 (1991)

Doubles
- Career record: 140–64
- Career titles: 1 WTA, 22 ITF
- Highest ranking: No. 90 (29 April 1991)

Grand Slam doubles results
- Australian Open: 1R (1991)
- French Open: 1R (1991)
- Wimbledon: 1R (1991)

Grand Slam mixed doubles results
- Wimbledon: 1R (1991)

Suzanna Wibowo
Medal record

Women's Tennis

Representing Indonesia

Asian Games
| Gold medal – first place | 1986 Seoul | Women's Doubles |
| Bronze medal – third place | 1986 Seoul | Mixed Doubles |
| Gold medal – first place | 1990 Beijing | Women's Doubles |
| Bronze medal – third place | 1990 Beijing | Mixed Doubles |

Suzanna Wibowo (born 25 November 1963) is a former professional tennis player from Indonesia. She is sometimes known by her maiden name Suzanna Anggarkusuma.

She first represented Indonesia in the Fed Cup in 1981. She made her debut as a professional in July 1986, aged 22, in the doubles competition of an ITF tournament in Brindisi, Italy, which she and partner Yayuk Basuki won. She played her last professional tournament in June 2006 in New Delhi at the age of 43.

She was part of Indonesia's Fed Cup team in 1981, 1982, 1983, 1984, 1985, 1986, 1987, 1988, 1989, 1990, 1991, 1992, 1993 and 2003.

Wibowo won the gold medal in the women's doubles at the 1986 Asian Games and 1990 Asian Games, partnered both times with Yayuk Basuki. She also won the bronze medal in the mixed doubles at both of those tournaments.

Through 1991, she qualified for the main draw in the women's doubles at the Australian Open and French Open, and both the women's doubles and mixed doubles at Wimbledon, but did not proceed past the first round in any of these competitions.

Wibowo represented Indonesia at the 1992 Summer Olympics at Barcelona.

She is married to fellow former professional tennis player Tintus Wibowo. Together they won the bronze medal in mixed doubles at the 1986 Asian Games. Both now are professional tennis coaches. They are the parents of Ayrton Wibowo, who is a professional player and part of Indonesia's 2008 Davis Cup team.

== WTA career finals ==
=== Doubles: 1 (1 title) ===
Legend
| Tier I | 0 |
| Tier II | 0 |
| Tier III | 0 |
| Tier IV & V | 1 |

Titles by surface
| Hard | 1 |
| Clay | 0 |
| Grass | 0 |
| Carpet | 0 |

| Result | W/L | Date | Tournament | Surface | Partner | Opponents | Score |
|---|---|---|---|---|---|---|---|
| Win | 1–0 | Apr 1991 | Pattaya Open, Thailand | Hard | (Japan) Nana Miyagi | (Japan) Rika Hiraki (Japan) Akemi Nishiya | 6–1, 6–4 |

== ITF Circuit finals ==
$50,000 tournaments
$25,000 tournaments
$10,000 tournaments

=== Singles: 7 (3–4) ===
| Result | No. | Date | Tournament | Surface | Opponent | Score |
|---|---|---|---|---|---|---|
| Loss | 1. | 24 November 1986 | ITF Kyoto, Japan | Hard | (France) Isabelle Crudo | 5–7, 6–7 |
| Loss | 2. | 12 July 1987 | ITF Paliano, Italy | Clay | (Italy) Laura Lapi | 6–4, 1–6, 4–6 |
| Win | 3. | 10 November 1987 | ITF Matsuyama, Japan | Hard | (Japan) Maya Kidowaki | 6–3, 6–3 |
| Win | 4. | 26 March 1989 | ITF Jakarta, Indonesia | Hard | (Thailand) Orawan Thampensri | 6–3, 4–6, 6–1 |
| Loss | 5. | 6 August 1989 | ITF Jakarta, Indonesia | Hard | (Indonesia) Yayuk Basuki | 6–7^{(5–7)}, 6–1, 4–6 |
| Loss | 6. | 12 August 1990 | ITF Tarakan, Indonesia | Hard | (Indonesia) Yayuk Basuki | 7–5, 4–6, 3–6 |
| Win | 7. | 18 November 1990 | ITF Nuriootpa, Australia | Hard | (Australia) Michelle Jaggard-Lai | 6–4, 6–2 |

=== Doubles: 29 (22–7) ===
| Result | No. | Date | Location | Surface | Partner | Opponents | Score |
|---|---|---|---|---|---|---|---|
| Win | 1. | 6 July 1986 | ITF Brindisi, Italy | Clay | (Indonesia) Yayuk Basuki | (China) Li Xinyi (China) Zhong Ni | 6–4, 4–6, 6–2 |
| Win | 2. | 27 October 1986 | ITF Saga, Japan | Grass | (Indonesia) Yayuk Basuki | (Netherlands) Marianne van der Torre (Brazil) Themis Zambrzycki | 6–2, 6–3 |
| Win | 3. | 10 November 1986 | ITF Matsuyama, Japan | Hard | (Indonesia) Yayuk Basuki | (New Zealand) Belinda Cordwell (United States) Wendy Wood | 0–6, 6–4, 6–2 |
| Win | 4. | 24 November 1986 | ITF Kyoto, Japan | Hard | (Indonesia) Yayuk Basuki | (Japan) Kazuko Ito (Japan) Junko Kimura | 6–3, 6–3 |
| Win | 5. | 12 July 1987 | ITF Paliano, Italy | Clay | (Indonesia) Yayuk Basuki | (Italy) Laura Lapi (Italy) Barbara Romanò | 6–4, 2–6, 6–0 |
| Win | 6. | 19 July 1987 | ITF Subiaco, Italy | Clay | (Indonesia) Yayuk Basuki | (Netherlands) Ilonka Leyten (Netherlands) Brigette Pardoel | 7–5, 7–5 |
| Win | 7. | 25 October 1987 | ITF Ibaraki, Japan | Hard | (Indonesia) Yayuk Basuki | (Australia) Alison Scott (United States) Stephanie Savides | 6–2, 4–6, 6–0 |
| Win | 8. | 1 November 1987 | ITF Matsuyama, Japan | Hard | (Indonesia) Yayuk Basuki | (United States) Jennifer Fuchs (United States) Jill Smoller | 6–4, 3–6, 6–1 |
| Win | 9. | 26 March 1989 | Jakarta, Indonesia | Hard | (Indonesia) Waya Walalangi | (Indonesia) Lukky Tedjamukti (Indonesia) Agustina Wibisono | 6–2, 2–6, 6–1 |
| Win | 10. | 11 June 1989 | Milan, Italy | Clay | (Indonesia) Yayuk Basuki | (New Zealand) Claudine Toleafoa (New Zealand) Ruth Seeman | 5–7, 6–4, 6–2 |
| Win | 11. | 6 August 1989 | Jakarta, Indonesia | Hard | (Indonesia) Yayuk Basuki | (Indonesia) Patricia Budiono (Indonesia) Lukky Tedjamukti | 4–6, 6–0, 6–3 |
| Win | 12. | 12 November 1989 | Nuriootpa, Australia | Hard | (Indonesia) Yayuk Basuki | (Australia) Justine Hodder (Australia) Kelli-Ann Johnston | 6–3, 6–4 |
| Win | 13. | 21 January 1990 | Jakarta, Indonesia | Hard | (Indonesia) Yayuk Basuki | (United Kingdom) Alexandra Niepel (United Kingdom) Caroline Billingham | w/o |
| Loss | 14. | 15 April 1990 | Bari, Italy | Clay | (Indonesia) Yayuk Basuki | (Soviet Union) Agnese Blumberga (West Germany) Barbara Rittner | 4–6, 6–4, 2–6 |
| Win | 15. | 22 April 1990 | Turin, Italy | Clay | (Japan) Ei Iida | (Italy) Federica Bonsignori (Hungary) Andrea Noszály | 7–5, 3–6, 6–4 |
| Loss | 16. | 10 June 1990 | Mantua, Italy | Clay | (Indonesia) Yayuk Basuki | (Czechoslovakia) Ivana Jankovská (Czechoslovakia) Eva Melicharová | 3–6, 5–7 |
| Win | 17. | 12 August 1990 | Jakarta, Indonesia | Hard | (Indonesia) Yayuk Basuki | (Indonesia) Irawati Moerid (Indonesia) Justi Kuswara | 7–5, 6–3 |
| Win | 18. | 28 October 1990 | Nagasaki, Japan | Hard | (Indonesia) Yayuk Basuki | (Australia) Kerry-Anne Guse (Australia) Kristine Kunce | 6–2, 7–6^{(10–8)} |
| Win | 19. | 4 November 1990 | Saga, Japan | Grass | (Indonesia) Yayuk Basuki | (Australia) Kerry-Anne Guse (Australia) Kristine Kunce | 6–3, 6–2 |
| Win | 20. | 18 November 1990 | Nuriootpa, Australia | Hard | (Indonesia) Yayuk Basuki | (Netherlands) Ingelise Driehuis (Australia) Louise Pleming | 7–6, 6–1 |
| Loss | 21. | 1 June 1992 | ITF Seoul, South Korea | Clay | (Indonesia) Romana Tedjakusuma | (South Korea) Kim Il-soon (South Korea) Lee Jeong-myung | 3–6, 3–6 |
| Loss | 22. | 8 June 1992 | ITF Seoul, South Korea | Hard | (Indonesia) Romana Tedjakusuma | (South Korea) Kim Il-soon (South Korea) Lee Jeong-myung | 3–6, 4–6 |
| Win | 23. | 1 February 1993 | ITF Bandar, Brunei | Hard | (Indonesia) Romana Tedjakusuma | (United States) Varalee Sureephong (Thailand) Tamarine Tanasugarn | 6–3, 6–1 |
| Win | 24. | 29 March 1993 | ITF Bangkok, Thailand | Hard | (Australia) Nicole Pratt | (Indonesia) Mimma Chernovita (Indonesia) Irawati Iskandar | w/o |
| Win | 25. | 12 December 1993 | ITF Manila, Philippines | Hard | (Indonesia) Natalia Soetrisno | (South Korea) Kim Hye-jeong (South Korea) Seo Hye-jin | 6–4, 7–5 |
| Loss | 26. | 24 January 1994 | ITF Surakarta, Indonesia | Hard | (Indonesia) Natalia Soetrisno | (South Korea) Kim Il-soon (South Korea) Choi Ju-yeon | 0–6, 6–2, 4–6 |
| Loss | 27. | 8 August 1994 | ITF Jakarta, Indonesia | Hard | (Indonesia) Natalia Soetrisno | (Hong Kong) Tang Min (Chinese Taipei) Weng Tzu-ting | 3–6, 1–6 |
| Win | 28. | 28 August 1994 | ITF İstanbul, Turkey | Hard | (Indonesia) Natalia Soetrisno | (Netherlands) Amanda Hopmans (Romania) Maria Popescu | 7–6, 6–4 |
| Loss | 29. | 11 November 1996 | ITF Manila, Philippines | Hard | (Indonesia) Marieke Gunawan | (Malaysia) Khoo Chin-bee (South Korea) Won Kyung-joo | 1–6, 3–6 |
