= Natalia Soetrisno =

Indonesian tennis player

- Country (sports): Indonesia
- Born: 9 January 1976 (age 50)
- Turned pro: 1989
- Retired: 1998
- Prize money: US$18,781

Singles
- Career record: 33-42
- Career titles: 0 WTA, 0 ITF
- Highest ranking: No. 284 (24 October 1994)

Doubles
- Career record: 36-34
- Career titles: 0 WTA, 3 ITF
- Highest ranking: No. 265 (7 November 1994)

Natalia Soetrisno (born 9 January 1976) is a former Indonesian professional tennis player.

She made her debut as a professional in August 1989, at the age of 13, at an ITF tournament in Jakarta, Indonesia. She won three ITF doubles titles during her career.

She was part of Indonesia's Fed Cup team in 1994.

== ITF finals ==
=== Singles (0–1) ===
Result	No.	Date	Tournament	Surface	Opponent	Scorel
Loss	1.	31 January 1994	Jakarta, Indonesia	Clay	(South Korea) Choi Ju-yeon	3–6, 3–6

=== Doubles (3–5) ===
Result	No.	Date	Tournament	Surface	Partner	Opponents	Score
Loss	1.	24 February 1992	Solo, Indonesia	Hard	(Indonesia) Mimma Chernovita	(China) Yi Jing-Qian (China) Chen Li	2–6, 2–6
Loss	2.	8 February 1993	Solo, Indonesia	Hard	(Indonesia) Romana Tedjakusuma	(South Korea) Kim Il-soon (South Korea) Kim Soon-mi	3–6, 2–6
Win	3.	15 February 1993	Bandung, Indonesia	Hard	(Indonesia) Romana Tedjakusuma	(South Korea) Park Ka-young (South Korea) Seo Hye-jin	6–2, 6–1
Loss	4.	5 December 1993	Singapore	Hard	(Indonesia) Romana Tedjakusuma	(Philippines) Francesca La'O (Philippines) Evangelina Olivarez	W/O
Win	5.	12 December 1993	Manila, Philippines	Hard	(Indonesia) Suzanna Wibowo	(South Korea) Kim Hye-jeong (South Korea) Seo Hye-jin	6–4, 7–5
Loss	6.	24 January 1994	Surakarta, Indonesia	Hard	(Indonesia) Suzanna Wibowo	(South Korea) Kim Il-soon (South Korea) Choi Ju-yeon	0–6, 6–2, 4–6
Loss	7.	8 August 1994	Jakarta, Indonesia	Hard	(Indonesia) Suzanna Wibowo	(Hong Kong) Tang Min (Chinese Taipei) Weng Tzu-ting	3–6, 1–6
Win	8.	28 August 1994	Istanbul, Turkey	Hard	(Indonesia) Suzanna Wibowo	(Netherlands) Amanda Hopmans (Romania) Maria Popescu	7-6, 6-4
