= Yi Jingqian =

Chinese tennis player

- Country (sports): China
- Born: 28 February 1974 (age 52) Nanjing, China
- Height: 1.68 m (5 ft 6 in)
- Turned pro: 1994
- Retired: 2001
- Prize money: $262,189

Singles
- Career record: 243–134
- Career titles: 13 ITF
- Highest ranking: No. 69 (22 July 1996)

Grand Slam singles results
- Australian Open: 3R (2000)
- French Open: 2R (1996)
- Wimbledon: 2R (2000)
- US Open: 1R (2000)

Doubles
- Career record: 71–64
- Career titles: 6 ITF
- Highest ranking: No. 206 (26 October 1998)
Medal record
Asian Games
| Silver medal – second place | 1998 Bangkok | Team |
| Bronze medal – third place | 1994 Hiroshima | Team |
| Bronze medal – third place | 1998 Bangkok | Singles |
| Bronze medal – third place | 1998 Bangkok | Doubles |
Summer Universiade
| Gold medal – first place | 1993 Buffalo | Singles |
| Gold medal – first place | 1993 Buffalo | Doubles |

Yi Jingqian (Chinese: 易景茜; pinyin: Yὶ Jῐngqiὰn; born 28 February 1974, in Nanjing) is a former tennis player from China. Yi first played in the China Fed Cup team in 1991, and turned professional in 1994. In her career, she won 13 singles titles and six doubles titles on the ITF Women's Circuit. Yi appeared in the finals of two WTA Tour tournaments in 1995, those at Surabaya and Pattaya. She appeared in the main draw in several major tournaments as a singles player from 1996 to 2001. The furthest she progressed in a major was when she reached the third round of the 2000 Australian Open.

Yi was part of the Chinese Federation Cup team in 1991, 1993, 1995, 1997, 1998, and 2000. She represented China at the Summer Olympics 1996 and 2000. Over the course of her career, she won four medals (three bronze, one silver) at the Asian Games. She retired from professional tennis in 2001.

== WTA Tour finals ==
=== Singles: 2 (2 runner-ups) ===
| Result | Date | Tournament | Surface | Opponent | Score |
|---|---|---|---|---|---|
| Loss | 2 October 1995 | Surabaya, Indonesia | Hard | (Chinese Taipei) Wang Shi-ting | 1–6, 1–6 |
| Loss | 13 November 1995 | Pattaya, Thailand | Hard | (Austria) Barbara Paulus | 4–6, 3–6 |

== ITF finals ==
$75,000 tournaments
$50,000 tournaments
$25,000 tournaments
$10,000 tournaments

=== Singles (13–9) ===
| Result | No. | Date | Tournament | Surface | Opponent | Score |
|---|---|---|---|---|---|---|
| Win | 1. | 10 February 1992 | Bangkok, Thailand | Hard | (China) Chen Li | 6–7, 6–3, 6–0 |
| Win | 2. | 24 February 1992 | Solo, Indonesia | Hard | (China) Chen Li | 6–3, 6–4 |
| Win | 3. | 14 June 1993 | Beijing, China | Hard | (Hong Kong) Tang Min | 6–0, 6–4 |
| Loss | 4. | 21 June 1993 | Tianjin, China | Hard | (China) Chen Li | 5–7, 6–2, 5–7 |
| Win | 5. | 20 March 1994 | Zaragoza, Spain | Clay | (Spain) Rosa Maria Llaneras | 7–5, 6–1 |
| Win | 6. | 28 March 1994 | Alicante, Spain | Clay | (Spain) Gala León García | 7–6^{(2)}, 6–7^{(7)}, 6–2 |
| Loss | 7. | 19 December 1994 | Manila, Philippines | Hard | (South Korea) Kim Eun-ha | 1–6, 4–6 |
| Win | 8. | 24 July 1995 | Salisbury, United States | Hard | (Canada) Vanessa Webb | 7–5, 4–6, 7–6^{(4)} |
| Loss | 9. | 31 July 1995 | Austin, United States | Hard | (China) Chen Li | 1–6, 6–2, 4–6 |
| Win | 10. | 4 September 1995 | Tianjin, China | Hard | (China) Li Li | 6–1, 6–4 |
| Win | 11. | 3 November 1997 | Beijing, China | Hard | (South Korea) Kim Eun-ha | 6–3, 7–5 |
| Loss | 12. | 26 April 1998 | Shenzhen, China | Hard | (South Korea) Kim Eun-ha | 3–6, 1–6 |
| Loss | 13. | 10 May 1998 | Seoul, South Korea | Clay | (South Korea) Choi Ju-yeon | 3–6, 5–7 |
| Win | 14. | 19 July 1998 | Qing Dao, China | Hard | (China) Ding Ding | 6–2, 6–3 |
| Loss | 15. | 28 March 1998 | Atlanta, United States | Hard | (United States) Jolene Watanabe | 1–6, 4–6 |
| Loss | 16. | 26 September 1999 | Kirkland, United States | Hard | (China) Li Fang | 3–6, 6–2, 1–6 |
| Win | 17. | 17 October 1999 | Brisbane, Australia | Hard | (Austria) Sybille Bammer | 6–4, 6–1 |
| Win | 18. | 5 March 2000 | Chengdu, China | Hard | (Russia) Elena Bovina | 6–1, 6–2 |
| Win | 19. | 6 March 2000 | Haikou, China | Hard | (Hungary) Katalin Marosi | 4–6, 6–0, 6–1 |
| Win | 20. | 10 April 2000 | La Cañada, United States | Clay | (Paraguay) Rossana de los Ríos | 3–6, 7–5, 6–3 |
| Loss | 21. | 20 August 2000 | Bronx, United States | Hard | (Slovakia) Daniela Hantuchová | 4–6, 4–6 |
| Loss | 22. | 29 April 2001 | Seoul, South Korea | Hard | (South Korea) Kim Eun-ha | 4–6, 2–6 |

=== Doubles (6–5) ===
| Result | No. | Date | Tournament | Surface | Partner | Opponents | Score |
|---|---|---|---|---|---|---|---|
| Loss | 1. | 7 October 1991 | Matsuyama, Japan | Hard | (Philippines) Jennifer Saret | (Hong Kong) Paulette Moreno (Australia) Jenny Byrne | 6–1, 4–6, 4–6 |
| Win | 2. | 17 February 1992 | Bandung, Indonesia | Hard | (China) Chen Li | (Japan) Mami Donoshiro (Japan) Ai Sugiyama | 4–6, 6–3, 6–4 |
| Win | 3. | 24 February 1992 | Solo, Indonesia | Hard | (China) Chen Li | (Indonesia) Mimma Chernovita (Indonesia) Natalia Soetrisno | 6–2, 6–2 |
| Win | 4. | 14 June 1993 | Beijing, China | Hard | (China) Chen Li | (South Korea) Kim Yeon-sook (South Korea) Kim Ih-sook | 6–4, 6–1 |
| Loss | 5. | 21 June 1993 | Tianjin, China | Hard | (China) Chen Li | (South Korea) Kim Hye-jeong (South Korea) Seo Hye-jin | 2–6, 2–6 |
| Win | 6. | 19 December 1994 | Manila, Philippines | Hard | (China) Chen Li | (Japan) Keiko Ishida (South Korea) Park In-sook | 6–2, 7–5 |
| Loss | 7. | 2 September 1996 | Beijing, China | Hard | (China) Chen Li | (China) Chen Jingjing (China) Li Li | 6–2, 5–7, ret. |
| Loss | 8. | 3 November 1997 | Beijing, China | Hard | (China) Chen Jingjing | (Japan) Keiko Ishida (Japan) Keiko Nagatomi | 6–7^{(4)}, 6–1, 3–6 |
| Win | 9. | 19 July 1998 | Qing Dao, China | Hard | (China) Li Li | (Malaysia) Khoo Chin-bee (Japan) Satoko Kurioka | 6–4, 6–2 |
| Loss | 10. | 3 August 1998 | Lexington, US | Hard | (India) Nirupama Sanjeev | (Australia) Amanda Grahame (Australia) Bryanne Stewart | 4–6, 6–1, 3–6 |
| Win | 11. | 31 January 2000 | Clearwater, US | Hard | (South Korea) Cho Yoon-jeong | (United States) Sandra Cacic (United States) Lindsay Lee-Waters | 6–4, 7–6^{(7)} |
