= Tang Min =

Chinese tennis player

- Full name: Tang Min
- Country (sports): China; Hong Kong
- Born: 26 January 1971 (age 54)
- Height: 172 cm (5 ft 8 in)
- Prize money: $71,433

Singles
- Highest ranking: No. 112 (24 July 1995)

Grand Slam singles results
- Australian Open: 1R (1996)
- French Open: 1R (1995)
- US Open: 1R (1995)

Doubles
- Highest ranking: No. 210 (17 August 1992)

Tang Min (born 26 January 1971) is a Chinese former professional tennis player and Olympian. Tang represented both China and Hong Kong in the Fed Cup.

== Early life ==
On 26 January 1971, Tang was born. Tang is originally from Hunan, China.

== Career ==
Tang appeared in 17 Fed Cup ties for the Chinese team from 1988 to 1992. Tang was a member of China's bronze medal-winning women's team at the 1990 Asian Games. At the 1992 Summer Olympics in Barcelona she represented China in the women's doubles, with Li Fang. The pair had a first round win over Greek qualifiers, before losing in the second round to Argentina.

By 1994, Tang was based in Hong Kong and under the guidance of Australian tennis coach Des Tyson. Tang had her best year on tour in 1995, reaching a career high ranking of 112 in the world. She was a semi-finalist at the 1995 Japan Open playing as a qualifier and later that year made the quarter-finals of the Thailand Open. It wasn't until 1997 that she debuted for the Hong Kong Fed Cup team. She played in a total of eight ties, across 1997 and 1998, while also serving as team captain.

== ITF finals ==
=== Singles (6–4) ===
Legend
$25,000 tournaments
$10,000 tournaments

Result	No.	Date	Tournament	Surface	Opponent	Score
Loss	1.	24 September 1989	Bangkok, Thailand	Hard	(Indonesia) Yayuk Basuki	3–6, 3–6
Win	2.	5 March 1990	Valencia, Spain	Clay	(Italy) Flora Perfetti	6–2, 0–6, 6–4
Win	3.	7 May 1990	Manila, Philippines	Hard	(China) Chen Li-Ling	7–6^{(5)}, 6–0
Loss	4.	2 September 1991	Bangkok, Thailand	Hard	(China) Li Fang	5–7, 2–6
Loss	5.	9 September 1991	Bangkok, Thailand	Hard	(China) Li Fang	0–6, 6–7
Loss	6.	14 June 1993	Beijing, China	Hard	(China) Yi Jing-Qian	0–6, 4–6
Win	7.	14 March 1994	Canberra, Australia	Grass	(Australia) Angie Woolcock	6–3, 6–0
Win	8.	21 March 1994	Newcastle, Australia	Grass	(Australia) Angie Marik	6–4, 6–2
Win	9.	16 May 1994	Tortosa, Spain	Clay	(Argentina) Cintia Tortorella	7–6^{(5)}, 6–3
Win	10.	13 March 1995	Canberra, Australia	Grass	(Australia) Gail Biggs	6–2, 6–0

=== Doubles (6–5) ===
Result	No.	Date	Tournament	Surface	Partner	Opponents	Score
Loss	1.	7 May 1990	Manila, Philippines	Hard	(China) Lin Ning	(China) Chen Li-Ling (China) Li Fang	3–6, 0–6
Win	2.	29 April 1991	Kuala Lumpur, Malaysia	Hard	(China) Li Fang	(Indonesia) Tanti Trayono (Indonesia) Agustina Wibisono	7–5, 6–3
Win	3.	6 May 1991	Manila, Philippines	Hard	(China) Li Fang	(Indonesia) Irawati Moerid (Indonesia) Lukky Tedjamukti	7–6^{(4)}, 6–7^{(5)}, 7–6^{(3)}
Win	4.	5 August 1991	Nicolosi, Italy	Hard	(China) Li Fang	(Italy) Gabriella Boschiero (United States) Kylie Johnson	6–0, 7–6^{(3)}
Win	5.	2 September 1991	Bangkok, Thailand	Hard	(China) Li Fang	(Thailand) Suvimol Duangchan (Thailand) Benjamas Sangaram	6–4, 6–2
Loss	6.	9 September 1991	Bangkok, Thailand	Hard	(China) Li Fang	(Indonesia) Irawati Moerid (Indonesia) Lukky Tedjamukti	6–4, 5–7, 4–6
Loss	7.	23 September 1991	Kuroshio, Japan	Hard	(China) Li Fang	(Japan) Naoko Kinoshita (Japan) Emiko Takahashi	7–5, 3–6, 4–6
Loss	8.	30 September 1991	Hokkaido, Japan	Hard	(China) Li Fang	(Japan) Yukie Koizumi (Japan) Miki Mizokuchi	1–6, 6–3, 3–6
Win	9.	14 October 1991	Kyoto, Japan	Hard	(China) Li Fang	(United States) Diana Gardner (Hong Kong) Paulette Moreno	6–4, 7–5
Loss	10.	30 September 1991	Saga, Japan	Grass	(China) Li Fang	(Mexico) Lupita Novelo (Australia) Kristine Kunce	7–5, 2–6, 5–7
Win	11.	8 August 1994	Jakarta, Indonesia	Hard	(Chinese Taipei) Weng Tzu-ting	(Indonesia) Natalia Soetrisno (Indonesia) Suzanna Wibowo	6–3, 6–1
