= Annabel Ellwood =

Australian tennis player (born 1978)

- Country (sports): Australia
- Born: 2 February 1978 (age 47) Canberra, Australia
- Height: 165 cm (5 ft 5 in)
- Plays: Right-handed
- Prize money: US$ 519,219

Singles
- Career record: 233–198
- Career titles: 9 ITF
- Highest ranking: No. 57 (21 April 1997)

Grand Slam singles results
- Australian Open: 3R (1998)
- French Open: 1R (1997, 1998)
- Wimbledon: 1R (1996, 1997)
- US Open: 2R (1996)

Doubles
- Career record: 168–161
- Career titles: 14 ITF
- Highest ranking: No. 60 (27 October 1997)

Grand Slam doubles results
- Australian Open: 3R (2000)
- French Open: 3R (2001)
- Wimbledon: 3R (2000)
- US Open: 3R (1997)

Grand Slam mixed doubles results
- Australian Open: 2R (2001, 2002)
- French Open: 1R (1997, 1999)
- Wimbledon: 3R (1996)

Annabel Ellwood (born 2 February 1978) is a former professional tennis player from Australia. She is the sister of former ATP Tour professional Ben Ellwood.

Ellwood, a right-handed player, born in Canberra, competed at seven Australian Open tournaments from 1995 to 2001. At the 1998 Australian Open, she was beaten by Amanda Coetzer in the third round, her best singles result at a Grand Slam event.

== WTA career finals ==
=== Doubles: 1 (runner-up) ===
| Result | Date | Tournament | Surface | Partner | Opponents | Score |
|---|---|---|---|---|---|---|
| Loss | 13 January 2001 | Canberra International, Australia | Hard | (South Africa) Nannie de Villiers | (United States) Nicole Arendt (Japan) Ai Sugiyama | 4–6, 6–7^{(2)} |

== ITF finals ==
$75,000 tournaments
$50,000 tournaments
$25,000 tournaments
$10,000 tournaments

=== Singles (9–9) ===
| Outcome | No. | Date | Tournament | Surface | Opponent | Score |
|---|---|---|---|---|---|---|
| Runner-up | 1. | 3 October 1994 | ITF Ibaraki, Japan | Hard | (South Korea) Kim Il-soon | 5–7, 6–7^{(5)} |
| Winner | 1. | 16 October 1994 | Tokyo, Japan | Hard | (Australia) Siobhan Drake-Brockman | 2–6, 6–3, 6–4 |
| Winner | 2. | 24 October 1994 | Kyoto, Japan | Hard | (South Korea) Kim Il-soon | 6–4, 7–6^{(2)} |
| Runner-up | 2. | 6 November 1994 | Saga, Japan | Grass | (Australia) Catherine Barclay | 2–6, 5–7 |
| Runner-up | 3. | 27 November 1994 | Bendigo, Australia | Hard | (Australia) Nicole Bradtke | 4–6, 7–6, 2–6 |
| Winner | 3. | 20 August 1995 | Fayetteville, United States | Hard | (Italy) Francesca Lubiani | 7–6^{(2)}, 3–6, 6–1 |
| Runner-up | 4. | 27 November 1995 | Bendigo, Australia | Hard | (Australia) Nicole Pratt | 4–6, 6–3, 2–6 |
| Runner-up | 5. | 10 December 1995 | Port Pirie, Australia | Hard | (Australia) Nicole Pratt | 6–4, 0–6, 4–6 |
| Winner | 4. | 10 November 1996 | Bendigo, Australia | Hard | (Australia) Jane Taylor | 6–3, 6–4 |
| Winner | 5. | 17 November 1996 | Port Pirie, Australia | Hard | (South Korea) Choi Ju-yeon | 6–3, 6–4 |
| Winner | 6. | 9 December 1996 | Sanctuary Cove, Australia | Hard | (Australia) Evie Dominikovic | 6–3, 6–3 |
| Winner | 7. | 11 April 1999 | Fresno, United States | Hard | (Australia) Alicia Molik | 3–6, 6–4, 6–2 |
| Runner-up | 6. | 10 May 1999 | Midlothian, United States | Clay | (United States) Erika deLone | 3–6, 4–6 |
| Runner-up | 7. | 8 August 1999 | Lexington, United States | Hard | (Argentina) Florencia Labat | 2–6, 7–5, 1–6 |
| Winner | 8. | 10 October 1999 | Dalby, Australia | Hard | (Indonesia) Wynne Prakusya | 7–6^{(4)}, 7–6^{(6)} |
| Runner-up | 8. | 24 October 1999 | Gold Coast, Australia | Hard | (Australia) Alicia Molik | 4–6, 3–6 |
| Runner-up | 9. | 6 February 2000 | Clearwater, United States | Hard | (United States) Marissa Irvin | 4–6, 3–6 |
| Winner | 9. | 26 February 2001 | ITF Bendigo, Australia | Hard | (Australia) Christina Wheeler | 3–6, 6–2, 6–4 |

=== Doubles (14–5) ===
| Outcome | No. | Date | Tournament | Surface | Partner | Opponents | Score |
|---|---|---|---|---|---|---|---|
| Winner | 1. | 25 April 1994 | ITF Woking, United Kingdom | Hard | (Australia) Lisa McShea | (Australia) Shannon Peters (Netherlands) Caroline Stassen | 3–6, 6–4, 6–0 |
| Winner | 2. | 17 October 1994 | Kugayama, Japan | Hard | (Australia) Trudi Musgrave | (South Korea) Kim Il-soon (South Korea) Park In-sook | 6–4, 6–0 |
| Winner | 3. | 24 October 1994 | Kyoto, Japan | Hard | (Australia) Trudi Musgrave | (China) Chen Jingjing (China) Li Li | 4–6, 7–6, 6–3 |
| Winner | 4. | 27 November 1995 | Mount Gambier, Australia | Hard | (Australia) Kirrily Sharpe | (Croatia) Maja Murić (France) Catherine Tanvier | 6–4, 6–1 |
| Winner | 5. | 11 December 1995 | Nuriootpa, Australia | Hard | (Australia) Kirrily Sharpe | (Croatia) Maja Murić (Australia) Louise Pleming | 6–4, 5–7, 6–4 |
| Winner | 6. | 11 August 1996 | Tarakan, Indonesia | Hard | (Australia) Kerry-Anne Guse | (South Korea) Jeon Mi-ra (Thailand) Benjamas Sangaram | 6–3, 6–2 |
| Runner-up | 1. | 20 October 1996 | Hayward, United States | Hard | (Argentina) Mercedes Paz | (Canada) Jill Hetherington (United States) Kathy Rinaldi | 5–7, 2–6 |
| Winner | 7. | 5 April 1999 | Fresno, United States | Hard | (United States) Erika deLone | (South Africa) Kim Grant (Sweden) Kristina Triska | 7–5, 7–5 |
| Winner | 8. | 18 April 1999 | Las Vegas, United States | Hard | (United States) Erika deLone | (Japan) Rika Hiraki (Australia) Lisa McShea | 7–6^{(4)}, 6–2 |
| Winner | 9. | 3 May 1999 | Sarasota, United States | Clay | (Australia) Lisa McShea | (Canada) Renata Kolbovic (United States) Karin Miller | 7–5, 7–6^{(3)} |
| Runner-up | 2. | 16 May 1999 | Midlothian, United States | Clay | (United States) Erika deLone | (South Africa) Nannie de Villiers (South Africa) Jessica Steck | 4–6, 0–6 |
| Runner-up | 3. | 25 July 1999 | Peachtree City, United States | Hard | (Australia) Bryanne Stewart | (Japan) Rika Hiraki (Japan) Nana Smith | 4–6, 1–6 |
| Runner-up | 4. | 1 August 1999 | Salt Lake City, United States | Hard | (Canada) Sonya Jeyaseelan | (Australia) Rachel McQuillan (Australia) Lisa McShea | 3–6, 6–4, 3–6 |
| Runner-up | 5. | 7 February 2000 | Rockford, United States | Hard | (South Africa) Jessica Steck | (United States) Dawn Buth (United States) Rebecca Jensen | 6–7^{(4)}, 5–7 |
| Winner | 10. | 21 February 2000 | Bushey, United Kingdom | Carpet (i) | (Belarus) Nadejda Ostrovskaya | (United Kingdom) Julie Pullin (United Kingdom) Lorna Woodroffe | 6–1, 6–1 |
| Winner | 11. | 20 October 2000 | Brisbane, Australia | Hard | (South Africa) Nannie de Villiers | (Australia) Kerry-Anne Guse (Australia) Rachel McQuillan | 3–5, 4–2, 5–3, 4–1 |
| Winner | 12. | 26 November 2000 | Nuriootpa, Australia | Hard | (South Africa) Nannie de Villiers | (Australia) Rachel McQuillan (Australia) Lisa McShea | 7–6^{(1)}, 6–3 |
| Winner | 13. | 3 December 2000 | Mount Gambier, Australia | Hard | (South Africa) Nannie de Villiers | (Australia) Evie Dominikovic (Australia) Amanda Grahame | 6–2, 6–2 |
| Winner | 14. | 10 December 2000 | ITF Port Pirie, Australia | Hard | (South Africa) Nannie de Villiers | (Australia) Evie Dominikovic (Australia) Amanda Grahame | 3–6, 6–2, 6–4 |
