= Kim Eun-ha =

South Korean tennis player

Kim Eun-ha (김은하)
- Country (sports): South Korea
- Born: 8 March 1975 (age 51) Goseong County, South Gyeongsang, South Korea
- Height: 1.73 m (5 ft 8 in)
- Retired: 2003
- Plays: Right-handed
- Prize money: $182,957

Singles
- Career record: 171–139
- Career titles: 8 ITF
- Highest ranking: No. 141 (26 October 1998)

Doubles
- Career record: 127–94
- Career titles: 15 ITF
- Highest ranking: No. 84 (27 July 1998)

Grand Slam doubles results
- Australian Open: 2R (1998)
- French Open: 1R (1998, 1999)
- Wimbledon: 2R (1998)
- US Open: 2R (1998)
Medal record
Representing South Korea
Summer Universiade
Gold medal – first place	1999 Palma de Mallorca	Mixed doubles
Silver medal – second place	2001 Beijing	Women's doubles
Bronze medal – third place	2001 Beijing	Mixed doubles

Kim Eun-ha (Korean: 김은하; born 8 March 1975) is a former professional tennis player from South Korea. A right-handed player, Kim had a serve-and-volley game and was best on hardcourts.

== Biography ==
=== Early life ===
Kim was born in 1975, one of three daughters of fisherman Young-soo and housewife Chung In-ja. She began playing tennis while at school at the age of 10 and graduated in 1994, after which she joined the professional tour.

=== Professional tour ===
Kim made the singles quarterfinals of the 1997 Danamon Open in Jakarta as a qualifier. Her performances in 1997 brought her ranking into the top 200 and she peaked at No. 141 in 1998. She won ITF singles titles in Seoul and Shenzhen during her career.

It was in doubles that she had the most success. After winning four ITF doubles events in 1997, Kim appeared in the main draw of all four Grand Slam events in the 1998 season and reached 84 in the world that year. One of those Grand Slam tournaments was the US Open where she and Virág Csurgó beat the American pairing of Jennifer Capriati and Alexandra Stevenson. On the WTA Tour she twice made doubles semifinals, with Émilie Loit at the 1998 Skoda Czech Open and Jeon Mi-ra in 2001 at the Pattaya Open.

=== Representative ===
Kim made her first appearances for the South Korea Fed Cup team in 1995 and was a regular fixture in the side throughout the campaign.

At the 1996 Summer Olympics in Atlanta, Kim was a member of the South Korean squad and featured in the women's doubles draw, with Park Sung-hee. The pair were beaten in the first round by South Africa's Amanda Coetzer and Mariaan de Swardt.

In 1997, South Korea competed in the Fed Cup World Group, having qualified for the first time by beating Bulgaria in the 1996 play-off. Her win over Bulgaria's Antoaneta Pandjerova in the fourth rubber of the play-off had the distinction of securing the World Group spot for South Korea. Their 1997 World Group tie was against Argentina in Seoul and they were beaten 4-1, with Kim losing both a singles and doubles match in three sets.

Her appearances in international competition for South Korea include the 1998 Asian Games and 2001 Summer Universiade. At the Universiade, which was held in Beijing, she won two medals, a silver in the women's doubles and a bronze in the mixed doubles.

== ITF Circuit finals ==
$50,000 tournaments
$25,000 tournaments
$10,000 tournaments

=== Singles (8–4) ===
Outcome	No.	Date	Location	Surface	Opponent	Score
Winner	1.	6 June 1994	Seoul, South Korea	Hard	(South Korea) Choi Young-ja	6–3, 7–5
Winner	2.	19 December 1994	Manila, Philippines	Hard	(China) Yi Jingqian	6–1, 6–4
Runner-up	3.	8 May 1995	Seoul, South Korea	Clay	(South Korea) Choi Ju-yeon	4–6, 5–7
Winner	4.	29 May 1995	Seoul, South Korea	Hard	(South Korea) Choi Young-ja	6–2, 6–2
Winner	5.	5 June 1995	Seoul, South Korea	Hard	(Japan) Madoka Kuki	6–2, 6–1
Winner	6.	6 May 1996	Seoul, South Korea	Clay	(South Korea) Choi Young-ja	2–6, 6–2, 6–3
Runner-up	7.	3 November 1997	Beijing, China	Hard	(China) Yi Jingqian	3–6, 5–7
Winner	8.	26 April 1998	Shenzhen, China	Hard	(China) Yi Jingqian	6–3, 6–1
Runner-up	9.	18 October 1998	Indian Wells, United States	Hard	(Bulgaria) Pavlina Nola	3–6, 4–6
Runner-up	10.	14 May 2000	Seoul, South Korea	Clay	(China) Li Na	3–6, 6–7^{(1–7)}
Winner	11.	4 June 2000	Shenzhen, China	Hard	(China) Sun Tiantian	6–4, 6–3
Winner	12.	29 April 2001	Seoul, South Korea	Hard	(China) Yi Jingqian	6–4, 6–2

=== Doubles (15–7) ===
Outcome	No.	Date	Tournament	Surface	Partner	Opponents	Score
Winner	1.	12 December 1994	Manila, Philippines	Hard	(South Korea) Choi Ju-yeon	(Japan) Keiko Ishida (South Korea) Park In-sook	6–3, 6–4
Winner	2.	20 March 1995	Bandar, Brunei	Hard	(South Korea) Choi Ju-yeon	(South Korea) Kim Soon-nam (South Korea) Kim Ih-sook	6–4, 6–0
Winner	3.	8 May 1995	Seoul, South Korea	Clay	(South Korea) Choi Ju-yeon	(Japan) Keiko Ishida (Japan) Mami Donoshiro	6–3, 6–3
Winner	4.	22 May 1995	Beijing, China	Hard	(South Korea) Kim Ih-sook	(Philippines) Francesca La'O (Chinese Taipei) Weng Tzu-ting	6–2, 6–3
Winner	5.	29 May 1995	Seoul, South Korea	Clay	(South Korea) Kim Ih-sook	(South Korea) Choi Jin (South Korea) Choi Young-ja	6–4, 7–5
Winner	6.	5 May 1997	Seoul, South Korea	Clay	(South Korea) Cho Yoon-jeong	(South Korea) Choi Young-ja (South Korea) Park Sung-hee	6–3, 7–6^{(8–6)}
Winner	7.	4 August 1997	Jakarta, Indonesia	Clay	(South Korea) Choi Young-ja	(Australia) Kerry-Anne Guse (Australia) Kristine Kunce	6–3, 6–4
Winner	8.	15 September 1997	Taipei, Taiwan	Hard	(South Korea) Choi Young-ja	(Australia) Kerry-Anne Guse (Australia) Catherine Barclay	1–6, 6–4, 6–3
Winner	9.	10 November 1997	Mount Gambier, Australia	Hard	(Australia) Catherine Barclay	(Australia) Renee Reid (Hungary) Réka Vidáts	6–3, 6–2
Winner	10.	26 April 1998	Shenzhen, China	Hard	(Australia) Catherine Barclay	(Australia) Gail Biggs (Japan) Tomoe Hotta	6–3, 6–2
Runner-up	11.	25 October 1998	Houston, United States	Hard	(Japan) Rika Hiraki	(United States) Nana Smith (Japan) Miho Saeki	1–6, 6–4, 1–6
Runner-up	12.	9 August 1999	Lexington Challenger, United States	Hard	(United Kingdom) Julie Pullin	(France) Alexandra Fusai (Argentina) Florencia Labat	4–6, 1–6
Winner	13.	3 October 1999	Seoul, South Korea	Hard	(Australia) Catherine Barclay	(Thailand) Tamarine Tanasugarn (South Korea) Park Sung-hee	4–6, 6–4, 6–2
Runner-up	14.	4 October 1999	Saga, Japan	Grass	(Slovenia) Petra Rampre	(Australia) Catherine Barclay (Canada) Vanessa Webb	7–6, 3–6, 2–6
Winner	15.	4 June 2000	Shenzhen, China	Hard	(Japan) Saori Obata	(China) Li Na (China) Li Ting	6–1, 6–3
Runner-up	16.	25 March 2001	La Cañada, United States	Hard	(Japan) Rika Hiraki	(United Kingdom) Julie Pullin (United Kingdom) Lorna Woodroffe	2–6, 4–6
Winner	17.	29 April 2001	Seoul, South Korea	Hard	(Indonesia) Wynne Prakusya	(Germany) Angelika Bachmann (Hungary) Adrienn Hegedűs	6–3, 6–2
Winner	18.	6 May 2001	Kangaroo Cup, Japan	Carpet	(Indonesia) Wynne Prakusya	(United Kingdom) Julie Pullin (United Kingdom) Lorna Woodroffe	1–6, 6–4, 7–6^{(7–2)}
Runner-up	19.	16 September 2001	Seoul, South Korea	Hard	(Japan) Rika Hiraki	(South Korea) Choi Young-ja (South Korea) Kim Eun-sook	3–6, 3–6
Runner-up	20.	18 November 2001	Port Pirie, Australia	Hard	(South Korea) Jeon Mi-ra	(Australia) Lisa McShea (Australia) Trudi Musgrave	5–7, 4–6
Winner	21.	25 February 2002	New Delhi, India	Hard	(South Korea) Choi Young-ja	(Czech Republic) Eva Birnerová (Czech Republic) Jana Hlaváčková	6–7^{(4–7)}, 6–4, 6–3
Runner-up	22.	16 November 2003	Manila, Philippines	Hard	(South Korea) Kim Ji-young	(Indonesia) Wynne Prakusya (Indonesia) Maya Rosa	6–2, 0–6, 4–6
