= Choi Ju-yeon =

South Korean tennis player

- Country (sports): South Korea
- Born: 19 November 1975 (age 50) Busan, South Korea
- Prize money: $59,713

Singles
- Career record: 125–40
- Career titles: 12 ITF
- Highest ranking: No. 176 (22 May 1995)

Grand Slam singles results
- Australian Open: Q1 (1996)

Doubles
- Career record: 62–31
- Career titles: 7 ITF
- Highest ranking: No. 179 (22 May 1995)

Team competitions
- Fed Cup: 14–4

Choi Ju-yeon (born 19 November 1975) is a South Korean former tennis player, who competed on the professional tour in the 1990s.

== Biography ==
Born in Busan, she reached a career-high of 176 in the world for singles, winning 12 ITF titles. She made the main draw of the WTA Tour tournament at Beijing in 1995, where she was beaten in the first round by Tessa Price, in three sets.

As a doubles player, she won three medals for South Korea in the Asian Games. At the 1994 Asian Games in Hiroshima, she won bronze medals in both the women's doubles and mixed doubles events. In Bangkok four years later, she was a silver medalist in the mixed doubles, partnering Kim Dong-hyun.

Choi represented South Korea in 14 Fed Cup ties, which included a World Group fixture against France in 1994.

== ITF finals ==
$25,000 tournaments
$10,000 tournaments

=== Singles (12–5) ===
Outcome	No.	Date	Tournament	Surface	Opponent	Score
Winner	1.	15 November 1993	Bangkok, Thailand	Hard	(South Korea) Yoo Kyung-sook	3–6, 6–4, 6–2
Runner-up	2.	6 December 1993	Manila, Philippines	Hard	(Thailand) Tamarine Tanasugarn	2–6, 3–6
Winner	3.	13 December 1993	Manila, Philippines	Hard	(South Korea) Jeon Mi-ra	6–2, 6–4
Winner	4.	31 January 1994	Jakarta, Indonesia	Clay	(Indonesia) Natalia Soetrisno	6–3, 6–3
Winner	5.	16 May 1994	Beijing, China	Hard	(Japan) Tomoe Hotta	6–3, 6–2
Winner	6.	30 May 1994	Daegu, South Korea	Hard	(South Korea) Kim Ih-sook	6–3, 6–1
Runner-up	7.	12 December 1994	Manila, Philippines	Hard	(China) Chen Li	1–6, 4–6
Winner	8.	20 March 1995	Bandar, Brunei	Hard	(South Korea) Jeon Mi-ra	6–4, 6–4
Winner	9.	27 March 1995	Jakarta, Indonesia	Hard	(Japan) Mami Donoshiro	6–1, 6–7^{(2)}, 6–2
Winner	10.	8 May 1995	Seoul, South Korea	Clay	(South Korea) Kim Eun-ha	6–4, 7–5
Winner	11.	4 August 1996	Horb, Germany	Clay	(Bulgaria) Pavlina Nola	6–3, 6–1
Runner-up	12.	17 November 1996	Port Pirie, Australia	Hard	(Australia) Annabel Ellwood	3–6, 4–6
Winner	13.	16 November 1997	Manila, Philippines	Hard	(Indonesia) Wynne Prakusya	0–6, 6–1, 6–4
Winner	14.	10 May 1998	Seoul, South Korea	Clay	(China) Yi Jingqian	6–3, 7–5
Runner-up	15.	7 June 1998	Little Rock, United States	Hard	(Australia) Cindy Watson	7–5, 4–6, 3–6
Winner	16.	18 October 1998	Seoul, South Korea	Hard	(South Korea) Park Sung-hee	6–4, 6–3
Runner-up	17.	25 July 1999	Valladolid, Spain	Hard	(Spain) María José Martínez Sánchez	6–7, 2–6

=== Doubles (7–4) ===
Outcome	No.	Date	Tournament	Surface	Partnering	Opponents	Score
Runner-up	1.	15 November 1993	Bangkok, Thailand	Hard	(South Korea) Yoo Kyung-sook	(Japan) Miho Saeki (Chinese Taipei) Weng Tzu-ting	6–3, 3–6, 3–6
Winner	2.	22 November 1993	Bangkok, Thailand	Hard	(South Korea) Yoo Kyung-sook	(Japan) Nao Akahori (Japan) Seiko Ichioka	6–2, 6–4
Runner-up	3.	13 December 1993	Manila, Philippines	Hard	(South Korea) Jeon Mi-ra	(Japan) Atsuko Shintani (Japan) Haruko Shigekawa	4–6, 2–6
Winner	4.	24 January 1994	Surakarta, Indonesia	Hard	(South Korea) Kim Il-soon	(Indonesia) Natalia Soetrisno (Indonesia) Suzanna Wibowo	6–0, 2–6, 6–4
Winner	5.	16 May 1994	Beijing, China	Hard	(South Korea) Choi Young-ja	(South Korea) Jeon Mi-ra (South Korea) Yoo Kyung-sook	6–2, 6–3
Runner-up	6.	23 May 1994	Beijing, China	Hard	(South Korea) Choi Young-ja	(China) Li Li (China) Bi Ying	6–7, 7–6, 4–6
Winner	7.	11 July 1994	Darmstadt, Germany	Clay	(South Korea) Park Sung-hee	(Argentina) Bettina Fulco (Argentina) Patricia Tarabini	6–4, 6–3
Winner	8.	12 December 1994	Manila, Philippines	Hard	(South Korea) Kim Eun-ha	(Japan) Keiko Ishida (South Korea) Park In-sook	6–3, 6–4
Winner	9.	20 March 1995	Bandar, Brunei	Hard	(South Korea) Kim Eun-ha	(South Korea) Kim Soon-nam (South Korea) Kim Ih-sook	6–4, 6–0
Winner	10.	8 May 1995	Seoul, South Korea	Clay	(South Korea) Kim Eun-ha	(Japan) Keiko Ishida (Japan) Mami Donoshiro	6–3, 6–3
Runner-up	11.	23 November 1997	Manila, Philippines	Hard	(South Korea) Eun Young-ha	(China) Chen Jingjing (China) Yang Qin	7–6, 3–6, 1–6
