= Li Li (tennis) =

Chinese tennis player

- Country (sports): China
- Born: 15 November 1976 (age 48)
- Prize money: $24,541

Singles
- Career record: 64–48
- Career titles: 1 ITF
- Highest ranking: No. 245 (13 May 1996)

Doubles
- Career record: 50–40
- Career titles: 3 ITF
- Highest ranking: No. 226 (10 October 1994)
Medal record
Asian Games
Silver medal – second place	1998 Bangkok	Women's team
Bronze medal – third place	1998 Bangkok	Women's doubles

Li Li (born 15 November 1976) is a Chinese former professional tennis player.

Li competed on the professional circuit in the 1990s and featured in a total of 13 ties for the China Fed Cup team. In Fed Cup tennis she had a 17–4 overall win–loss record, with wins in nine of her ten singles rubbers.

On the WTA Tour, Li twice made the second round of the China Open, in both 1995 and 1996.

At the 1998 Asian Games in Bangkok, she was a member of the silver medal-winning Chinese team and won a women's doubles bronze medal with Yi Jing-Qian.

== ITF finals ==
$25,000 tournaments
$10,000 tournaments

=== Singles (1–1) ===
Outcome	No.	Date	Location	Surface	Opponent	Score
Winner	1.	22 May 1995	Beijing, China	Hard	(South Korea) Choi Young-ja	6–2, 6–3
Runner-up	2.	4 September 1995	Tianjin, China	Hard	(China) Yi Jingqian	1–6, 4–6

=== Doubles (3–3) ===
Outcome	No.	Date	Location	Surface	Partnering	Opponents	Score
Winner	1.	23 May 1994	Beijing, China	Hard	(China) Bi Ying	(South Korea) Choi Ju-yeon (South Korea) Choi Young-ja	7–6, 6–7, 6–4
Runner-up	2.	24 October 1994	Kyoto, Japan	Hard	(China) Chen Jingjing	(Australia) Annabel Ellwood (Australia) Trudi Musgrave	6–4, 6–7, 3–6
Runner-up	3.	25 March 1996	Bandung, Indonesia	Hard	(China) Chen Jingjing	(Japan) Saori Obata (Japan) Nami Urabe	3–6, 3–6
Winner	4.	8 September 1996	Beijing, China	Hard	(China) Chen Jingjing	(China) Chen Li (China) Yi Jingqian	2–6, 7–5 ret.
Runner-up	5.	7 June 1998	Little Rock, United States	Hard	(China) Li Ting	(Japan) Keiko Ishida (Japan) Keiko Nagatomi	5–7, 1–6
Winner	6.	19 July 1998	Qing Dao, China	Hard	(China) Yi Jingqian	(Malaysia) Khoo Chin-bee (Japan) Satoko Kurioka	6–4, 6–2

== See also ==
- List of China Fed Cup team representatives
