= Chen Jingjing =

Chinese tennis player

- Country (sports): China
- Born: 19 August 1975 (age 50)
- Prize money: US$ 18,961

Singles
- Highest ranking: No. 244 (23 September 1996)

Doubles
- Highest ranking: No. 290 (19 October 1998)

Chen Jingjing (born 19 August 1975) is a former professional tennis player from China.

Chen, who had a career high ranking of 244, had her best performance on the WTA Tour at the 1995 Nokia Open in Beijing, where she beat fourth seed Karin Kschwendt to make the round of 16.

In 1996 she appeared in five Fed Cup ties for China, for a 6/2 record, winning three matches in both singles and doubles.

== ITF finals ==
$25,000 tournaments
$10,000 tournaments

=== Singles (1–1) ===
Outcome	No.	Date	Tournament	Surface	Opponent	Score
Runner-up	1.	2 September 1996	Beijing, China	Hard	(China) Chen Li	6–7, 6–4, 1–6
Winner	2.	17 November 1997	Manila, Philippines	Hard	(Malaysia) Khoo Chin-bee	6–1, 7–6^{(2)}

=== Doubles (3–3) ===
Outcome	No.	Date	Tournament	Surface	Partner	Opponents	Score
Runner-up	1.	24 October 1994	Kyoto, Japan	Hard	(China) Li Li	(Australia) Annabel Ellwood (Australia) Trudi Musgrave	6–4, 6–7^{(3)}, 3–6
Runner-up	2.	25 March 1996	Bandung, Indonesia	Hard	(China) Li Li	(Japan) Saori Obata (Japan) Nami Urabe	3–6, 3–6
Winner	1.	8 September 1996	Beijing, China	Hard	(China) Li Li	(China) Chen Li (China) Yi Jing-Qian	2–6, 7–5 ret.
Runner-up	3.	3 November 1997	Beijing, China	Hard	(China) Yi Jing-Qian	(Japan) Keiko Ishida (Japan) Keiko Nagatomi	6–7^{(4)}, 6–1, 3–6
Winner	2.	23 November 1997	Manila, Philippines	Hard	(China) Yang Qin	(South Korea) Choi Ju-yeon (South Korea) Eun Young-ha	6–7^{(6)}, 6–3, 6–1
Winner	3.	23 February 1998	Mumbai, India	Hard	(China) Yang Qin	(Japan) Nami Urabe (Japan) Yoriko Yamagishi	7–6^{(5)}, 6–2

== See also ==
- List of China Fed Cup team representatives
