= 2011 Fukuoka International Women's Cup – Doubles =

Doubles
- 2011 Fukuoka International Women's Cup

Final
- Champion: (Japan) Shuko Aoyama (Japan) Rika Fujiwara
- Runner-up: (Japan) Aiko Nakamura (Japan) Junri Namigata
- Score: 7–6(3), 6–0

Events
Singles	Doubles
← 2010 ·	Fukuoka International Women's Cup	· 2012 →

Misaki Doi and Kotomi Takahata were the defending champions but both chose not to participate.
Shuko Aoyama and Rika Fujiwara defeated Aiko Nakamura and Junri Namigata in the final 7–6(3), 6–0.

== Seeds ==
1. (Japan) Shuko Aoyama / (Japan) Rika Fujiwara (champions)
2. (Chinese Taipei) Chan Hao-ching / (Chinese Taipei) Chan Yung-jan (quarterfinals)
3. (Japan) Kumiko Iijima / (Thailand) Tamarine Tanasugarn (quarterfinals)
4. (Russia) Ksenia Lykina / (Japan) Remi Tezuka (semifinals)

== Draw ==
=== Key ===
- Q = Qualifier
- WC = Wild card
- LL = Lucky loser
- Alt = Alternate
- SE = Special exempt
- PR = Protected ranking
- ITF = ITF entry
- JE = Junior exempt
- w/o = Walkover
- r = Retired
- d = Defaulted
- SR = Special ranking

=== Draw ===
First round
1	(Japan) S Aoyama (Japan) R Fujiwara	6	6
Q	(Chinese Taipei) W-h Hsu (Japan) E Takao	0	4
SR	(Australia) M Adamczak (United Kingdom) E Webley-Smith	7	6
(South Korea) S-j Kim (South Korea) J-a Lee	5	4
4	(Russia) K Lykina (Japan) R Tezuka	6	6
WC	(Japan) E Hozumi (Japan) M Kato	4	1
Q	(Australia) S Letcher (United Kingdom) K O'Brien	6	6
(Chinese Taipei) S-y Kao (Thailand) V Wongteanchai	2	4
WC	(Japan) A Nakamura (Japan) J Namigata	4	6	[10]
(Japan) M Miyamura (Japan) M Tanaka	6	3	[6]
(Australia) A Bai (Japan) C Ogi	4	3
3	(Japan) K Iijima (Thailand) T Tanasugarn	6	6
WC	(Japan) A Omae (Japan) R Ozaki	6	5	[5]
(Japan) A Oka (Japan) A Yonemura	3	7	[10]
(Japan) N Hamamura (Japan) E Sema	4	3
2	(Chinese Taipei) H-c Chan (Chinese Taipei) Y-j Chan	6	6

Quarterfinals
1	(Japan) S Aoyama (Japan) R Fujiwara	6	6
SR	(Australia) M Adamczak (United Kingdom) E Webley-Smith	1	0
4	(Russia) K Lykina (Japan) R Tezuka	6	6
Q	(Australia) S Letcher (United Kingdom) K O'Brien	3	3
WC	(Japan) A Nakamura (Japan) J Namigata	6	4	[10]
3	(Japan) K Iijima (Thailand) T Tanasugarn	3	4	[1]
(Japan) A Oka (Japan) A Yonemura	3	6	[16]
2	(Chinese Taipei) H-c Chan (Chinese Taipei) Y-j Chan	6	1	[14]

Semifinals
1	(Japan) S Aoyama (Japan) R Fujiwara	6	6
4	(Russia) K Lykina (Japan) R Tezuka	1	4
WC	(Japan) A Nakamura (Japan) J Namigata	6	4	[10]
(Japan) A Oka (Japan) A Yonemura	4	6	[5]

Final
1	(Japan) S Aoyama (Japan) R Fujiwara	7	6
WC	(Japan) A Nakamura (Japan) J Namigata	6^{3}	0
