= 2011 Kōfu International Open – Singles =

Singles
- 2011 Kōfu International Open

Final
- Champion: (Chinese Taipei) Chang Kai-chen
- Runner-up: (Luxembourg) Mandy Minella
- Score: 6–4, 1–6, 6–4

Events
Singles	Doubles
← 2010 ·	Kōfu International Open	· 2012 →

Sachie Ishizu was the defending champion, but lost to Tamarine Tanasugarn in the second round.
Chang Kai-chen won the title, defeating Mandy Minella 6–4, 1–6, 6–4 in the final.

== Seeds ==
1. (Thailand) Tamarine Tanasugarn (semifinals)
2. (Japan) Erika Sema (semifinals)
3. (Thailand) Noppawan Lertcheewakarn (first round)
4. (Chinese Taipei) Chang Kai-chen (champion)
5. (Luxembourg) Mandy Minella (final)
6. (Japan) Yurika Sema (quarterfinals)
7. (Japan) Junri Namigata (quarterfinals)
8. (Japan) Aiko Nakamura (first round)

== Main draw ==
=== Key ===
- Q = Qualifier
- WC = Wild card
- LL = Lucky loser
- Alt = Alternate
- SE = Special exempt
- PR = Protected ranking
- ITF = ITF entry
- JE = Junior exempt
- w/o = Walkover
- r = Retired
- d = Defaulted
- SR = Special ranking

=== Finals ===
Semifinals
1	(Thailand) Tamarine Tanasugarn	3	2
5	(Luxembourg) Mandy Minella	6	6
4	(Chinese Taipei) Chang Kai-chen	6	4	6
2	(Japan) Erika Sema	4	6	4

Final
5	(Luxembourg) Mandy Minella	4	6	4
4	(Chinese Taipei) Chang Kai-chen	6	1	6

=== Top half ===
First round
1	(Thailand) T Tanasugarn	6	6
WC	(Japan) R Ozaki	3	4
(Japan) S Ishizu	6	6
Q	(Japan) Y Miyazaki	2	4
(Japan) C Ogi	1	2
(Japan) A Omae	6	6
WC	(Japan) R Sawayanagi	1	6	6
8	(Japan) A Nakamura	6	4	3
3	(Thailand) N Lertcheewakarn	6	0	2
(Japan) C Takayama	4	6	6
(Japan) E Takao	7^{7}	4	2
(Japan) M Eguchi	6^{2}	6	6
(Japan) H Watanabe	7^{10}	3	6^{4}
Q	(Japan) Y Sakai	6^{8}	6	7^{7}
(Japan) K Hisami	1	2
5	(Luxembourg) M Minella	6	6

Second round
1	(Thailand) T Tanasugarn	6	6
(Japan) S Ishizu	1	3
(Japan) A Omae	7	6^{6}	7^{7}
WC	(Japan) R Sawayanagi	5	7^{8}	6^{2}
(Japan) C Takayama	6^{5}	6	6
(Japan) M Eguchi	7^{7}	1	2
Q	(Japan) Y Sakai	1	0
5	(Luxembourg) M Minella	6	6

Quarterfinals
1	(Thailand) T Tanasugarn	6	6
(Japan) A Omae	3	4
(Japan) C Takayama	0	6	2
5	(Luxembourg) M Minella	6	4	6

Semifinals
1	(Thailand) T Tanasugarn	3	2
5	(Luxembourg) M Minella	6	6

=== Bottom half ===
First round
7	(Japan) J Namigata	6	6
WC	(Japan) M Minokoshi	0	1
(Japan) N Hamamura	7^{7}	1	1
(Chinese Taipei) W-h Hsu	6^{5}	6	6
(Japan) A Oka	6	5	5
(Japan) A Yonemura	2	7	7
(Chinese Taipei) C-w Chan	3	2
4	(Chinese Taipei) K-c Chang	6	6
6	(Japan) Y Sema	6	6
(Japan) Y Koshino	4	4
WC	(Japan) Y Tanaka	4	6	6
Q	(Japan) M Ayukawa	6	0	2
Q	(Japan) A Yamasoto	5	6	3
(Japan) R Tezuka	7	4	6
(Japan) M Tanaka	0	2
2	(Japan) E Sema	6	6

Second round
7	(Japan) J Namigata	6	5	7
(Chinese Taipei) W-h Hsu	2	7	5
(Japan) A Yonemura	3	1
4	(Chinese Taipei) K-c Chang	6	6
6	(Japan) Y Sema	6	6
WC	(Japan) Y Tanaka	1	1
(Japan) R Tezuka	2	0
2	(Japan) E Sema	6	6

Quarterfinals
7	(Japan) J Namigata	6	3	4
4	(Chinese Taipei) K-c Chang	2	6	6
6	(Japan) Y Sema	0	6	3
2	(Japan) E Sema	6	4	6

Semifinals
4	(Chinese Taipei) K-c Chang	6	4	6
2	(Japan) E Sema	4	6	4
