= 2012 Kurume Best Amenity International Women's Tennis – Doubles =

Doubles
- 2012 Kurume Best Amenity International Women's Tennis

Final
- Champions: (China) Han Xinyun (China) Sun Shengnan
- Runners-up: (Russia) Ksenia Lykina (United Kingdom) Melanie South
- Score: 6–1, 6–0

Events
Singles	Doubles
← 2011 ·	Kurume Best Amenity International Women's Tennis	· 2013 →

Ayumi Oka and Akiko Yonemura were the defending champions, but Oka chose not to participate. Yonemura partnered up with Maria Abramović, but lost in the first round to Ksenia Lykina and Melanie South 7–5, 4–6, [9–11].

Han Xinyun and Sun Shengnan won the title defeating Ksenia Lykina and Melanie South in the final 6–1, 6–0.

== Seeds ==
1. (United States) Jessica Pegula / (China) Zheng Saisai (semifinals)
2. (China) Han Xinyun / (China) Sun Shengnan (champions)
3. (China) Liu Wanting / (China) Xu Yifan (first round)
4. (Chinese Taipei) Chan Chin-wei / (Chinese Taipei) Hsu Wen-hsin (first round)

== Draw ==
=== Key ===
- Q = Qualifier
- WC = Wild card
- LL = Lucky loser
- Alt = Alternate
- SE = Special exempt
- PR = Protected ranking
- ITF = ITF entry
- JE = Junior exempt
- w/o = Walkover
- r = Retired
- d = Defaulted
- SR = Special ranking

First round
1	(United States) J Pegula (China) S Zheng	6	6
(Japan) K Hisami (Thailand) V Wongteanchai	3	1
WC	(Japan) M Inoue (Japan) Y Miyazaki	6	6
Q	(Japan) S Hisamitsu (Japan) Y Sakai	0	1
4	(Chinese Taipei) C-w Chan (Chinese Taipei) W-h Hsu	6	4	[7]
WC	(Japan) K Ito (Japan) Y Nakano	1	6	[10]
(Russia) K Lykina (United Kingdom) M South	5	6	[11]
(Croatia) M Abramović (Japan) A Yonemura	7	4	[9]
WC	(Japan) M Kato (Japan) R Sawayanagi	6	5	[8]
Q	(Chinese Taipei) S-y Hsieh (Chinese Taipei) S-y Kao	1	7	[10]
(Ukraine) T Arefyeva (Russia) M Sirotkina	6	6
3	(China) W Liu (China) Y Xu	3	3
(Australia) M Adamczak (Australia) S Bengson	6^{4}	6	[6]
(Japan) A Omae (Japan) R Tezuka	7^{7}	1	[10]
(Japan) S Aoyama (Japan) J Namigata	6^{3}	6	[8]
2	(China) X Han (China) S Sun	7^{7}	2	[10]

Quarterfinals
1	(United States) J Pegula (China) S Zheng	7	6
WC	(Japan) M Inoue (Japan) Y Miyazaki	5	1
WC	(Japan) K Ito (Japan) Y Nakano	6^{2}	1
(Russia) K Lykina (United Kingdom) M South	7^{7}	6
Q	(Chinese Taipei) S-y Hsieh (Chinese Taipei) S-y Kao	7^{8}	2	[7]
(Ukraine) T Arefyeva (Russia) M Sirotkina	6^{6}	6	[10]
(Japan) A Omae (Japan) R Tezuka	6	3	[4]
2	(China) X Han (China) S Sun	0	6	[10]

Semifinals
1	(United States) J Pegula (China) S Zheng	3	2
(Russia) K Lykina (United Kingdom) M South	6	6
(Ukraine) T Arefyeva (Russia) M Sirotkina	3	1
2	(China) X Han (China) S Sun	6	6

Finals
(Russia) K Lykina (United Kingdom) M South	1	0
2	(China) X Han (China) S Sun	6	6
