= 2011 Fukuoka International Women's Cup – Singles =

Singles
- 2011 Fukuoka International Women's Cup

Final
- Champion: (Thailand) Tamarine Tanasugarn
- Runner-up: (Chinese Taipei) Chan Yung-jan
- Score: 6–4, 5–7, 7–5

Events
Singles	Doubles
← 2010 ·	Fukuoka International Women's Cup	· 2012 →

Junri Namigata was the defending champion but lost in the second round to Aiko Nakamura.
Tamarine Tanasugarn defeated Chan Yung-jan in the final 6–4, 5–7, 7–5.

== Seeds ==
1. (Japan) Junri Namigata (second round)
2. (Thailand) Tamarine Tanasugarn (champion)
3. (Chinese Taipei) Chan Yung-jan (final)
4. (South Korea) Lee Jin-a (first round)
5. (Japan) Erika Sema (quarterfinals)
6. (Japan) Kumiko Iijima (semifinals)
7. (South Korea) Kim So-jung (first round)
8. (United Kingdom) Katie O'Brien (second round)

== Draw ==
=== Key ===
- Q = Qualifier
- WC = Wild card
- LL = Lucky loser
- Alt = Alternate
- SE = Special exempt
- PR = Protected ranking
- ITF = ITF entry
- JE = Junior exempt
- w/o = Walkover
- r = Retired
- d = Defaulted
- SR = Special ranking

=== Finals ===
Semifinals
WC	(Japan) Aiko Nakamura	1	3
3	(Chinese Taipei) Chan Yung-jan	6	6
6	(Japan) Kumiko Iijima	6^{3}	6	2
2	(Thailand) Tamarine Tanasugarn	7	4	6

Final
3	(Chinese Taipei) Chan Yung-jan	4	7	5
2	(Thailand) Tamarine Tanasugarn	6	5	7

=== Top half ===
First round
1	(Japan) J Namigata	7	6
(Japan) R Tezuka	6^{4}	4
(Thailand) N Luangnam	2	0
WC	(Japan) A Nakamura	6	6
(Japan) N Hamamura	7	7
Q	(Japan) M Miyamura	5	6^{2}
(New Zealand) S Jones	6	6
7	(South Korea) S-j Kim	3	2
3	(Chinese Taipei) Y-j Chan	6	6
(Japan) S Aoyama	4	4
(China) Q Wang	6	6
(Japan) R Fujiwara	4	4
Q	(Japan) E Takao	6	6
Q	(Japan) K Ito	2	4
(South Korea) Y-r Lee	3	4
8	(United Kingdom) K O'Brien	6	6

Second round
1	(Japan) J Namigata	4	2
WC	(Japan) A Nakamura	6	6
(Japan) N Hamamura	6	6
(New Zealand) S Jones	4	4
3	(Chinese Taipei) Y-j Chan	6	6
(China) Q Wang	1	1
Q	(Japan) E Takao	7	7
8	(United Kingdom) K O'Brien	6^{1}	5

Quarterfinals
WC	(Japan) A Nakamura	2	6	7
(Japan) N Hamamura	6	2	5
3	(Chinese Taipei) Y-j Chan	6	6
Q	(Japan) E Takao	4	6^{4}

Semifinals
WC	(Japan) A Nakamura	1	3
3	(Chinese Taipei) Y-j Chan	6	6

=== Bottom half ===
First round
6	(Japan) K Iijima	6	6
WC	(Japan) Y Nakano	1	2
WC	(Japan) A Yonemura	6	2
(Japan) C Okadaue	1	1	r
SE	(United Kingdom) E Webley-Smith	4	6	6
(Chinese Taipei) W-h Hsu	6	2	0
WC	(Japan) M Kato	6	6
4	(South Korea) J-a Lee	3	1
5	(Japan) E Sema	6	7
Q	(Japan) M Inoue	4	6^{5}
(Japan) R Fuda	7	6
SR	(Australia) M Adamczak	5	2
(Japan) S Akita	1	6^{3}
(Japan) S Ishizu	6	7
(China) S Zheng	4	0
2	(Thailand) T Tanasugarn	6	6

Second round
6	(Japan) K Iijima	6	6
WC	(Japan) A Yonemura	3	5
SR	(United Kingdom) E Webley-Smith	6	6^{6}	6
WC	(Japan) M Kato	2	7	2
5	(Japan) E Sema	1	6	7
(Japan) R Fuda	6	4	6^{1}
(Japan) S Ishizu	6	0	3
2	(Thailand) T Tanasugarn	4	6	6

Quarterfinals
6	(Japan) K Iijima	6	6^{4}	6
SR	(United Kingdom) E Webley-Smith	2	7	2
5	(Japan) E Sema	2	3
2	(Thailand) T Tanasugarn	6	6

Semifinals
6	(Japan) K Iijima	6^{3}	6	2
2	(Thailand) T Tanasugarn	7	4	6
