= 2011 Kurume Best Amenity International Women's Tennis – Doubles =

Doubles
- 2011 Kurume Best Amenity International Women's Tennis

Final
- Champion: (Japan) Ayumi Oka (Japan) Akiko Yonemura
- Runner-up: (Japan) Rika Fujiwara (Thailand) Tamarine Tanasugarn
- Score: 6–3, 5–7, [10–8]

Events
Singles	Doubles
- Kurume Best Amenity International Women's Tennis

Sun Shengnan and Xu Yifan were the defending champions, but both chose not to participate.
Ayumi Oka and Akiko Yonemura defeated Rika Fujiwara and Tamarine Tanasugarn in the final 6–3, 5–7, [10–8].

== Seeds ==
1. (Japan) Rika Fujiwara / (Thailand) Tamarine Tanasugarn (final)
2. (Australia) Alison Bai / (Chinese Taipei) Kao Shao-yuan (quarterfinals)
3. (Japan) Erika Takao / (Japan) Remi Tezuka (quarterfinals)
4. (South Korea) Kim So-jung / (South Korea) Lee Jin-a (first round)

== Draw ==
Key

- Q = Qualifier
- WC = Wild card
- LL = Lucky loser
- Alt = Alternate
- ITF = ITF entry
- PR = Protected ranking
- SR = Special ranking
- SE = Special exempt
- JE = Junior exempt
- JR = Junior Accelerator Programme entrant
- CO = College Accelerator Programme entrant
- NG = Next Gen Accelerator Program entrant
- w/o = Walkover
- r = Retired
- d = Defaulted

=== Draw ===
First round
1	(Japan) R Fujiwara (Thailand) T Tanasugarn	6	6
(Japan) K Hisami (Japan) Y Miyazaki	1	1
(Australia) S Letcher (United Kingdom) K O'Brien	7	6
(Japan) N Hamamura (Japan) A Inoue	6^{6}	2
3	(Japan) E Takao (Japan) R Tezuka	6	6
WC	(Japan) H Inoue (Japan) M Inoue	3	6^{1}
(Japan) S Aoyama (Japan) S Ishizu	6	6
(Japan) C Ogi (Thailand) V Wongteanchai	2	4
(Australia) M Adamczak (United Kingdom) E Webley-Smith	6	6
Q	(United Kingdom) N George (Japan) M Inoue	2	3
Q	(Chinese Taipei) W-h Hsu (China) S Zheng	3	6	[10]
4	(South Korea) S-j Kim (South Korea) J-a Lee	6	3	[6]
(Japan) A Oka (Japan) A Yonemura	7	6
WC	(Russia) K Lykina (Russia) O Puchkova	6^{3}	3
WC	(Japan) E Mutaguchi (Japan) A Omae	3	4
2	(Australia) A Bai (Chinese Taipei) S-y Kao	6	6

Quarterfinals
1	(Japan) R Fujiwara (Thailand) T Tanasugarn	6	6
(Australia) S Letcher (United Kingdom) K O'Brien	4	0
3	(Japan) E Takao (Japan) R Tezuka	3	3
(Japan) S Aoyama (Japan) S Ishizu	6	6
(Australia) M Adamczak (United Kingdom) E Webley-Smith	1	2
Q	(Chinese Taipei) W-h Hsu (China) S Zheng	6	6
(Japan) A Oka (Japan) A Yonemura	6	6
2	(Australia) A Bai (Chinese Taipei) S-y Kao	3	3

Semifinals
1	(Japan) R Fujiwara (Thailand) T Tanasugarn	7	6
(Japan) S Aoyama (Japan) S Ishizu	5	2
Q	(Chinese Taipei) W-h Hsu (China) S Zheng	4	4
(Japan) A Oka (Japan) A Yonemura	6	6

Final
1	(Japan) R Fujiwara (Thailand) T Tanasugarn	3	7	[8]
(Japan) A Oka (Japan) A Yonemura	6	5	[10]
