= 2011 Kurume Best Amenity International Women's Tennis – Singles =

Singles
- 2011 Kurume Best Amenity International Women's Tennis

Final
- Champions: (Japan) Rika Fujiwara
- Runners-up: (Australia) Monique Adamczak
- Score: 6–3, 6–1

Events
Singles	Doubles
← 2010 ·	Kurume Best Amenity International Women's Tennis	· 2012 →

Kristýna Plíšková was the defending champion, but chose to participate at the 2011 Sparta Prague Open instead.
Rika Fujiwara defeated Monique Adamczak in the final 6–3, 6–1.

== Seeds ==
1. (Japan) Junri Namigata (withdrew)
2. (Thailand) Tamarine Tanasugarn (second round)
3. (Japan) Erika Sema (quarterfinals)
4. (South Korea) Lee Jin-a (second round)
5. (Thailand) Nudnida Luangnam (first round)
6. (United Kingdom) Katie O'Brien (first round)
7. (New Zealand) Sacha Jones (first round)
8. (South Korea) Kim So-jung (first round)

== Draw ==
=== Key ===
- Q = Qualifier
- WC = Wild card
- LL = Lucky loser
- Alt = Alternate
- SE = Special exempt
- PR = Protected ranking
- ITF = ITF entry
- JE = Junior exempt
- w/o = Walkover
- r = Retired
- d = Defaulted
- SR = Special ranking

=== Finals ===
Semifinals
(China) Zheng Saisai	0	6^{4}
(Japan) Rika Fujiwara	6	7
(Japan) Shiho Akita	5	6	3
SR	(Australia) Monique Adamczak	7	2	6

Final
(Japan) Rika Fujiwara	6	6
SR	(Australia) Monique Adamczak	3	1

=== Top half ===
First round
LL	(Japan) H Watanabe	6	6
WC	(Japan) E Mutaguchi	1	1
WC	(Japan) Y Miyazaki	2	6^{1}
(China) S Zheng	6	7
(Russia) O Puchkova	5	6	3
Q	(Japan) A Omae	7	2	6
LL	(Japan) A Inoue	4	6	7
5	(Thailand) N Luangnam	6	4	6^{1}
3	(Japan) E Sema	6	7
(China) Q Wang	3	5
(Japan) R Tezuka	2	4
Q	(Japan) A Yonemura	6	6
(Japan) E Takao	6	6
WC	(Japan) Y Nakano	4	1
(Japan) R Fujiwara	6	0	6
6	(United Kingdom) K O'Brien	4	6	4

Second round
LL	(Japan) H Watanabe	6^{3}	3
(China) S Zheng	7	6
Q	(Japan) A Omae	6	6
LL	(Japan) A Inoue	2	2
3	(Japan) E Sema	6	6
Q	(Japan) A Yonemura	1	2
(Japan) E Takao	2	2
(Japan) R Fujiwara	6	6

Quarterfinals
(China) S Zheng	3	6	6
Q	(Japan) A Omae	6	2	3
3	(Japan) E Sema	4	1
(Japan) R Fujiwara	6	6

Semifinals
(China) S Zheng	0	6^{4}
(Japan) R Fujiwara	6	7

=== Bottom half ===
First round
7	(New Zealand) S Jones	3	6	0
(Chinese Taipei) W-h Hsu	6	4	6
(Japan) S Aoyama	1	6	6^{6}
(United Kingdom) E Webley-Smith	6	4	7
Q	(Thailand) V Wongteanchai	5	5
(Japan) S Akita	7	7
Q	(Japan) C Ogi	3	3
4	(South Korea) J-a Lee	6	6
8	(South Korea) S-j Kim	4	4
WC	(Japan) A Nakamura	6	6
(Japan) N Hamamura	2	2
(Japan) S Ishizu	6	6
SR	(Australia) M Adamczak	6	6
(South Korea) Y-r Lee	0	2
(Australia) S Letcher	2	6	5
2	(Thailand) T Tanasugarn	6	3	7

Second round
(Chinese Taipei) W-h Hsu	1	6	6
(United Kingdom) E Webley-Smith	6	4	2
(Japan) S Akita	6	6^{5}	6
4	(South Korea) J-a Lee	2	7	3
WC	(Japan) A Nakamura	4	2
(Japan) S Ishizu	6	6
SR	(Australia) M Adamczak	6	6
2	(Thailand) T Tanasugarn	4	3

Quarterfinals
(Chinese Taipei) W-h Hsu	7	4	5
(Japan) S Akita	6^{2}	6	7
(Japan) S Ishizu	6	4	1
SR	(Australia) M Adamczak	4	6	6

Semifinals
(Japan) S Akita	5	6	3
SR	(Australia) M Adamczak	7	2	6
