= 2011 Kōfu International Open – Doubles =

Doubles
- 2011 Kōfu International Open

Final
- Champions: (Chinese Taipei) Chan Chin-wei (Chinese Taipei) Hsu Wen-hsin
- Runners-up: (Japan) Remi Tezuka (Japan) Akiko Yonemura
- Score: 6–3, 6–4

Events
Singles	Doubles
← 2010 ·	Kōfu International Open	· 2012 →

Seiko Okamoto and Maki Arai were the defending champions, but both players chose not to participate.
Chan Chin-wei and Hsu Wen-hsin won the title, defeating Remi Tezuka and Akiko Yonemura 6–3, 6–4 in the final.

== Seeds ==
1. (Luxembourg) Mandy Minella / (Thailand) Tamarine Tanasugarn (quarterfinals, withdrew)
2. (Chinese Taipei) Chan Chin-wei / (Chinese Taipei) Hsu Wen-hsin (champions)
3. (Japan) Erika Sema / (Japan) Yurika Sema (first round)
4. (Chinese Taipei) Chen Yi / (China) Liu Wanting (first round)

== Draw ==
=== Key ===
- Q = Qualifier
- WC = Wild card
- LL = Lucky loser
- Alt = Alternate
- SE = Special exempt
- PR = Protected ranking
- ITF = ITF entry
- JE = Junior exempt
- w/o = Walkover
- r = Retired
- d = Defaulted
- SR = Special ranking

=== Draw ===
First round
1	(Luxembourg) M Minella (Thailand) T Tanasugarn	6	7
WC	(Japan) M Ninomiya (Japan) R Sawayanagi	2	5
(Japan) N Hamamura (Japan) A Oka	6	2	[8]
(South Korea) H-s Kim (Japan) C Ogi	0	6	[10]
4	(Chinese Taipei) Y Chen (China) W Liu	3	4
(Japan) K Takahata (Japan) M Tanaka	6	6
(Japan) R Tezuka (Japan) A Yonemura	6	7
Q	(Japan) M Imanishi (Japan) M Minokoshi	2	5
(Japan) K Hisami (Japan) Y Koshino	6	6
WC	(Japan) Y Kawasaki (Japan) M Tamura	3	1
(Chinese Taipei) K-c Chang (Chinese Taipei) S-y Hsieh	7^{7}	6
3	(Japan) E Sema (Japan) Y Sema	6^{4}	4
Q	(Japan) A Omae (Japan) H Watanabe	7^{7}	7
(Japan) E Takao (Japan) C Takayama	6^{5}	5
WC	(Japan) Y Koizumi (Japan) Y Nakashima	0	1
2	(Chinese Taipei) C-w Chan (Chinese Taipei) W-h Hsu	6	6

Quarterfinals
1	(Luxembourg) M Minella (Thailand) T Tanasugarn
(South Korea) H-s Kim (Japan) C Ogi	w/o
(Japan) K Takahata (Japan) M Tanaka	4	2
(Japan) R Tezuka (Japan) A Yonemura	6	6
(Japan) K Hisami (Japan) Y Koshino	2^{r}
(Chinese Taipei) K-c Chang (Chinese Taipei) S-y Hsieh	5
Q	(Japan) A Omae (Japan) H Watanabe	2	2
2	(Chinese Taipei) C-w Chan (Chinese Taipei) W-h Hsu	6	6

Semifinals
(South Korea) H-s Kim (Japan) C Ogi	4	3
(Japan) R Tezuka (Japan) A Yonemura	6	6
(Chinese Taipei) K-c Chang (Chinese Taipei) S-y Hsieh	6	4	[9]
2	(Chinese Taipei) C-w Chan (Chinese Taipei) W-h Hsu	1	6	[11]

Finals
(Japan) R Tezuka (Japan) A Yonemura	3	4
2	(Chinese Taipei) C-w Chan (Chinese Taipei) W-h Hsu	6	6
