= 2012 Fukuoka International Women's Cup – Doubles =

Doubles
- 2012 Fukuoka International Women's Cup

Final
- Champions: (Australia) Monique Adamczak (Australia) Stephanie Bengson
- Runners-up: (Japan) Misa Eguchi (Japan) Akiko Omae
- Score: 6–4, 6–4

Events
Singles	Doubles
← 2011 ·	Fukuoka International Women's Cup	· 2013 →

Shuko Aoyama and Rika Fujiwara were the defending champions, but Fujiwara chose not to participate. Aoyama paired up with Junri Namigata but lost in the first round to Chan Chin-wei and Hsu Wen-hsin.

Monique Adamczak and Stephanie Bengson won the title, defeating Misa Eguchi and Akiko Omae in the final, 6–4, 6–4.

== Seeds ==
1. (Chinese Taipei) Chan Yung-jan / (Thailand) Tamarine Tanasugarn (withdrew)
2. (United States) Jessica Pegula / (China) Zheng Saisai (quarterfinals)
3. (China) Han Xinyun / (China) Sun Shengnan (quarterfinals)
4. (China) Liu Wanting / (China) Xu Yifan (quarterfinals)

== Draw ==
=== Key ===
- Q = Qualifier
- WC = Wild card
- LL = Lucky loser
- Alt = Alternate
- SE = Special exempt
- PR = Protected ranking
- ITF = ITF entry
- JE = Junior exempt
- w/o = Walkover
- r = Retired
- d = Defaulted
- SR = Special ranking

First round
LL	(Japan) A Inoue (Japan) A Yonemura	6	6
(Ukraine) T Arefyeva (Poland) J Jegiołka	4	4
(Japan) S Aoyama (Japan) J Namigata	6	6^{7}	[10]
(Chinese Taipei) C-w Chan (Chinese Taipei) W-h Hsu	2	7^{9}	[12]
4	(China) X Han (China) S Sun	6	4	[11]
(Russia) K Lykina (United Kingdom) M South	2	6	[9]
(Australia) M Adamczak (Australia) S Bengson	6	6
Q	(Japan) Y Koshino (Japan) M Tanaka	4	4
(United Kingdom) S Murray (United Kingdom) E Webley-Smith	3	7	[8]
(Croatia) M Abramović (Japan) R Tezuka	6	5	[10]
Q	(Japan) S Enmoto (Japan) S Hisamitsu	0	0
4	(China) W Liu (China) Y Xu	6	6
WC	(Japan) M Ninomiya (Japan) R Sawayanagi	5	4
WC	(Japan) M Eguchi (Japan) A Omae	7	6
WC	(Japan) M Miyahara (Japan) H Ogata	1	1
2	(United States) J Pegula (China) S Zheng	6	6

Quarterfinals
LL	(Japan) A Inoue (Japan) A Yonemura	6	2	[10]
(Chinese Taipei) C-w Chan (Chinese Taipei) W-h Hsu	3	6	[9]
4	(China) X Han (China) S Sun	6	3	[4]
(Australia) M Adamczak (Australia) S Bengson	3	6	[10]
(Croatia) M Abramović (Japan) R Tezuka	3	6	[10]
4	(China) W Liu (China) Y Xu	6	1	[2]
WC	(Japan) M Eguchi (Japan) A Omae	7^{7}	3	[10]
2	(United States) J Pegula (China) S Zheng	6^{5}	6	[5]

Semifinals
LL	(Japan) A Inoue (Japan) A Yonemura	1	6	[8]
(Australia) M Adamczak (Australia) S Bengson	6	1	[10]
(Croatia) M Abramović (Japan) R Tezuka	6^{3}	6	[6]
WC	(Japan) M Eguchi (Japan) A Omae	7^{7}	4	[10]

Finals
(Australia) M Adamczak (Australia) S Bengson	6	6
WC	(Japan) M Eguchi (Japan) A Omae	4	4
