= 2012 Fukuoka International Women's Cup – Singles =

Singles
- 2012 Fukuoka International Women's Cup

Final
- Champion: (Australia) Casey Dellacqua
- Runner-up: (Australia) Monique Adamczak
- Score: 6–4, 6–1

Events
Singles	Doubles
← 2011 ·	Fukuoka International Women's Cup	· 2013 →

Tamarine Tanasugarn was the defending champion, but withdrew before the event started.

Casey Dellacqua won the title, defeating Monique Adamczak in the final, 6–4, 6–1.

== Seeds ==
1. (Thailand) Tamarine Tanasugarn (withdrew)
2. (Australia) Casey Dellacqua (champion)
3. (Japan) Kurumi Nara (withdrew)
4. (Chinese Taipei) Chan Yung-jan (second round; retired)
5. (Russia) Marta Sirotkina (first round)
6. (Japan) Misa Eguchi (first round)
7. (China) Wang Qiang (first round)
8. (Japan) Akiko Omae (second round)

== Main draw ==
=== Key ===
- Q = Qualifier
- WC = Wild card
- LL = Lucky loser
- Alt = Alternate
- SE = Special exempt
- PR = Protected ranking
- ITF = ITF entry
- JE = Junior exempt
- w/o = Walkover
- r = Retired
- d = Defaulted
- SR = Special ranking

=== Finals ===
Semifinals
(Australia) Monique Adamczak	6	6
(United Kingdom) Melanie South	3	4
(China) Zheng Saisai	6^{3}	4
2	(Australia) Casey Dellacqua	7^{7}	6

Final
(Australia) Monique Adamczak	4	1
2	(Australia) Casey Dellacqua	6	6

=== Top half ===
First round
LL	(Japan) R Tezuka	0	2
(Australia) M Adamczak	6	6
(China) Y Xu	6	4	6
WC	(Japan) M Kato	2	6	2
(Japan) A Nakamura	6	6
Q	(Japan) K Ito	3	4
(Japan) J Namigata	6	6
7	(China) Q Wang	4	4
LL	(Russia) K Lykina	6	6
(Ukraine) T Arefyeva	3	3
Q	(Kazakhstan) Z Diyas	6	7^{7}
(Hong Kong) L Zhang	3	6^{0}
Q	(China) S Sun	6	6
(United States) J Pegula	0	4
(United Kingdom) M South	7^{7}	2	6
6	(Japan) M Eguchi	6^{4}	6	3

Second round
(Australia) M Adamczak	6	6
(China) Y Xu	0	1
(Japan) A Nakamura	3	4
(Japan) J Namigata	6	6
LL	(Russia) K Lykina	6	6
Q	(Kazakhstan) Z Diyas	2	3
Q	(China) S Sun	2	4
(United Kingdom) M South	6	6

Quarterfinals
(Australia) M Adamczak	6	6
(Japan) J Namigata	4	1
LL	(Russia) K Lykina	6^{4}	4
(United Kingdom) M South	7^{7}	6

Semifinals
(Australia) M Adamczak	6	6
(United Kingdom) M South	3	4

=== Bottom half ===
First round
8	(Japan) A Omae	4	6	6
(South Korea) S-j Kim	6	4	4
(China) S Zheng	5	6	6
(China) X Han	7	2	2
(Japan) E Takao	6	7
Q	(Japan) S Akita	3	5
(United Kingdom) E Webley-Smith	3	3
4	(Chinese Taipei) Y-j Chan	6	6
5	(Russia) M Sirotkina	4	3
WC	(Japan) M Ninomiya	6	6
(Austria) N Hofmanova	7	1	6
(Croatia) M Abramović	5	6	4
(United Kingdom) T Moore	4	6	6^{7}
WC	(Japan) R Ozaki	6	4	7^{9}
WC	(Japan) A Yonemura	7	2	2
2	(Australia) C Dellacqua	5	6	6

Second round
8	(Japan) A Omae	4	4
(China) S Zheng	6	6
(Japan) E Takao	5
4	(Chinese Taipei) Y-j Chan	3^{r}
WC	(Japan) M Ninomiya	3	2
(Austria) N Hofmanova	6	6
WC	(Japan) R Ozaki	3	6	0
2	(Australia) C Dellacqua	6	3	6

Quarterfinals
(China) S Zheng	6	6
(Japan) E Takao	2	2
(Austria) N Hofmanova	4	4
2	(Australia) C Dellacqua	6	6

Semifinals
(China) S Zheng	6^{3}	4
2	(Australia) C Dellacqua	7^{7}	6
