= 2011 HP Open – Singles qualifying =

This article displays the qualifying draw of the 2011 HP Open.

== Players ==
=== Seeds ===
1. (Japan) Erika Sema (qualified)
2. (United Kingdom) Laura Robson (first round)
3. (Kazakhstan) Zarina Diyas (first round)
4. (Thailand) Noppawan Lertcheewakarn (qualified)
5. (Japan) Rika Fujiwara (qualifying competition)
6. (France) Kristina Mladenovic (first round)
7. (Czech Republic) Kristýna Plíšková (qualifying competition)
8. (Czech Republic) Karolína Plíšková (qualifying competition)

=== Qualifiers ===
1. (Japan) Erika Sema
2. (Kazakhstan) Yaroslava Shvedova
3. (Japan) Shuko Aoyama
4. (Thailand) Noppawan Lertcheewakarn

== Qualifying draw ==
=== First qualifier ===
First round
1	(Japan) Erika Sema	6	6
WC	(Japan) Yoshimi Kawasaki	0	0
(Japan) Misa Eguchi	6^{6}	3
(Japan) Yurika Sema	7^{8}	6
(Japan) Chinami Ogi	1	0
(Turkey) Çağla Büyükakçay	6	6
(Japan) Ryoko Fuda	6	4	0
5	(Japan) Rika Fujiwara	2	6	6

Second round
1	(Japan) Erika Sema	5	6	6
(Japan) Yurika Sema	7	0	3
(Turkey) Çağla Büyükakçay	2	6	3
5	(Japan) Rika Fujiwara	6	2	6

Qualifying competition
1	(Japan) Erika Sema	6	6
5	(Japan) Rika Fujiwara	3	4

=== Second qualifier ===
First round
2	(United Kingdom) Laura Robson	6^{4}	4
(Chinese Taipei) Hsieh Su-wei	7^{7}	6
(Japan) Natsumi Hamamura	6	6
(Japan) Shiho Akita	4	3
WC	(Japan) Risa Ozaki	6	6
(Japan) Ayumi Oka	4	3
(Kazakhstan) Yaroslava Shvedova	4	6	6
6	(France) Kristina Mladenovic	6	1	2

Second round
(Chinese Taipei) Hsieh Su-wei	6	6
(Japan) Natsumi Hamamura	1	2
WC	(Japan) Risa Ozaki	0	2
(Kazakhstan) Yaroslava Shvedova	6	6

Qualifying competition
(Chinese Taipei) Hsieh Su-wei	2	4
(Kazakhstan) Yaroslava Shvedova	6	6

=== Third qualifier ===
First round
3	(Kazakhstan) Zarina Diyas	6^{7}	4
(Japan) Junri Namigata	7^{9}	6
(Japan) Shuko Aoyama	6	2	6
(China) Wang Qiang	4	6	1
(United States) Lindsay Lee-Waters	0	4
(United States) Abigail Spears	6	6
WC	(Japan) Kanami Tsuji	0	1
8	(Czech Republic) Karolína Plíšková	6	6

Second round
(Japan) Junri Namigata	4	6	5
(Japan) Shuko Aoyama	6	2	7
(United States) Abigail Spears	4	4
8	(Czech Republic) Karolína Plíšková	6	6

Qualifying competition
(Japan) Shuko Aoyama	6	3	7^{7}
8	(Czech Republic) Karolína Plíšková	0	6	6^{1}

=== Fourth qualifier ===
First round
4	(Thailand) Noppawan Lertcheewakarn	3	6	6
(China) Han Xinyun	6	1	2
(China) Sun Shengnan	2	6	7^{9}
(Japan) Erika Takao	6	2	6^{7}
WC	(Japan) Kotomi Takahata	4	2
(Japan) Chiaki Okadaue	6	6
(Japan) Akiko Omae	2	6^{6}
7	(Czech Republic) Kristýna Plíšková	6	7^{8}

Second round
4	(Thailand) Noppawan Lertcheewakarn	6	6
(China) Sun Shengnan	1	2
(Japan) Chiaki Okadaue	3	6	1
7	(Czech Republic) Kristýna Plíšková	6	3	6

Qualifying competition
4	(Thailand) Noppawan Lertcheewakarn	7	4	6
7	(Czech Republic) Kristýna Plíšková	6^{5}	6	4
