= 2011 Kōfu International Open =

- Date: 3–9 October
- Edition: 4th
- Location: Kōfu, Yamanashi, Japan

Champions

Singles
- (Chinese Taipei) Chang Kai-chen

Doubles
- (Chinese Taipei) Chan Chin-wei / (Chinese Taipei) Hsu Wen-hsin
← 2010 ·	Kōfu International Open	· 2012 →

The 2011 Kōfu International Open was a professional tennis tournament played on hard courts. It was the fourth edition of the tournament which was part of the 2011 ITF Women's Circuit. It took place in Kōfu, Yamanashi, Japan between 3 and 9 October 2011.

== WTA entrants ==
=== Seeds ===
Country	Player	Rank^{1}	Seed
THA	Tamarine Tanasugarn	93	1
JPN	Erika Sema	124	2
THA	Noppawan Lertcheewakarn	149	3
TPE	Chang Kai-chen	150	4
LUX	Mandy Minella	155	5
JPN	Yurika Sema	189	6
JPN	Junri Namigata	198	7
JPN	Aiko Nakamura	224	8

- ^{1} Rankings are as of September 26, 2011.

=== Other entrants ===
The following players received wildcards into the singles main draw:

- (Japan) Mai Minokoshi
- (Japan) Risa Ozaki
- (Japan) Riko Sawayanagi
- (Japan) Yuuki Tanaka

The following players received entry from the qualifying draw:

- (Japan) Mana Ayukawa
- (Japan) Yumi Miyazaki
- (Japan) Yuriko Sakai
- (Japan) Aki Yamasoto

== Champions ==
=== Singles ===
(Chinese Taipei) Chang Kai-chen def. (Luxembourg) Mandy Minella, 6–4, 1–6, 6–4

=== Doubles ===
(Chinese Taipei) Chan Chin-wei / (Chinese Taipei) Hsu Wen-hsin def. (Japan) Remi Tezuka / (Japan) Akiko Yonemura, 6–3, 6–4
