= 2011 Fukuoka International Women's Cup =

- Date: 2–8 May
- Edition: 10th
- Location: Fukuoka, Japan

Champions

Singles
- (Thailand) Tamarine Tanasugarn

Doubles
- (Japan) Shuko Aoyama / (Japan) Rika Fujiwara
← 2010 ·	Fukuoka International Women's Cup	· 2012 →

The 2011 Fukuoka International Women's Cup was a professional tennis tournament played on carpet courts. It was part of the 2011 ITF Women's Circuit. It took place in Fukuoka, Japan between 2 and 9 May 2011.

== Singles entrants ==
=== Seeds ===
Country	Player	Rank^{1}	Seed
JPN	Junri Namigata	111	1
THA	Tamarine Tanasugarn	131	2
TPE	Chan Yung-jan	138	3
KOR	Lee Jin-a	171	4
JPN	Erika Sema	185	5
JPN	Kumiko Iijima	208	6
KOR	Kim So-jung	216	7
GBR	Katie O'Brien	221	8

- Rankings are as of April 25, 2010.

=== Other entrants ===
The following players received wildcards into the singles main draw:

- (Japan) Miyu Kato
- (Japan) Aiko Nakamura
- (Japan) Yumi Nakano
- (Japan) Akiko Yonemura

The following players received entry from the qualifying draw:

- (Japan) Miyabi Inoue
- (Japan) Kazusa Ito
- (Japan) Miki Miyamura
- (Japan) Erika Takao

== Champions ==
=== Singles ===
(Thailand) Tamarine Tanasugarn def. (Chinese Taipei) Chan Yung-jan, 6–4, 5–7, 7–5

=== Doubles ===
(Japan) Shuko Aoyama / (Japan) Rika Fujiwara def. (Japan) Aiko Nakamura / (Japan) Junri Namigata, 7–6(3), 6–0
