= 2012 Kurume Best Amenity International Women's Tennis – Singles =

Sports championship

Singles
- 2012 Kurume Best Amenity International Women's Tennis

Final
- Champion: (China) Zheng Saisai
- Runner-up: (Australia) Monique Adamczak
- Score: 7–5, 6–2

Events
Singles	Doubles
← 2011 ·	Kurume Best Amenity International Women's Tennis	· 2013 →

Rika Fujiwara was the defending champion, but chose not to participate.

Zheng Saisai won the title, defeating Monique Adamczak in the final, 7–5, 6–2.

== Seeds ==
1. (Russia) Marta Sirotkina (second round)
2. (Thailand) Varatchaya Wongteanchai (first round)
3. (China) Wang Qiang (quarterfinals)
4. (Japan) Akiko Omae (first round)
5. (Australia) Monique Adamczak (final)
6. (Japan) Junri Namigata (semifinals)
7. (China) Zheng Saisai (champion)
8. (Japan) Aiko Nakamura (quarterfinals)

== Main draw ==
=== Key ===
- Q = Qualifier
- WC = Wild card
- LL = Lucky loser
- Alt = Alternate
- SE = Special exempt
- PR = Protected ranking
- ITF = ITF entry
- JE = Junior exempt
- w/o = Walkover
- r = Retired
- d = Defaulted
- SR = Special ranking

=== Finals ===
Semifinals
7	(China) Zheng Saisai	6	6
(Croatia) Maria Abramović	3	2
5	(Australia) Monique Adamczak	2	6	6
6	(Japan) Junri Namigata	6	4	4

Final
7	(China) Zheng Saisai	7	6
5	(Australia) Monique Adamczak	5	2

=== Top half ===
First round
1	(Russia) M Sirotkina	7^{8}	6
(Russia) K Lykina	6^{6}	4
Q	(South Korea) S-j Kim	6	5	2
(Kazakhstan) Z Diyas	1	7	6
(United Kingdom) M South	6	6
(Japan) S Aoyama	1	2
Q	(Poland) J Jegiołka	3	3
7	(China) S Zheng	6	6
4	(Japan) A Omae	0	6	3
WC	(Japan) R Sawayanagi	6	4	6
(Croatia) M Abramović	4	6	6
WC	(Japan) A Yonemura	6	1	4
Q	(Japan) M Ninomiya	7	6
(Hong Kong) L Zhang	5	4
Q	(Japan) K Ito	0	2
8	(Japan) A Nakamura	6	6

Second round
1	(Russia) M Sirotkina	6^{6}	2
(Kazakhstan) Z Diyas	7^{8}	6
(United Kingdom) M South	3	5
7	(China) S Zheng	6	7
WC	(Japan) R Sawayanagi	2	0
(Croatia) M Abramović	6	6
Q	(Japan) M Ninomiya	7^{7}	1	1
8	(Japan) A Nakamura	6^{4}	6	6

Quarterfinals
(Kazakhstan) Z Diyas	6	0	4
7	(China) S Zheng	3	6	6
(Croatia) M Abramović	7^{7}	4	6
8	(Japan) A Nakamura	6^{5}	6	4

Semifinals
7	(China) S Zheng	6	6
(Croatia) M Abramović	3	2

=== Bottom half ===
First round
5	(Australia) M Adamczak	6	6
(Ukraine) T Arefyeva	2	4
(Japan) E Takao	6	6
(China) Y Xu	1	0
(United Kingdom) E Webley-Smith	6	6
(United Kingdom) T Moore	2	4
(China) X Han	3	2
3	(China) Q Wang	6	6
6	(Japan) J Namigata	6	6
WC	(Japan) Y Miyazaki	2	3
(United Kingdom) S Murray	4	3
(United States) J Pegula	6	6
(Austria) N Hofmanova	6	5	6
WC	(Japan) Y Nakano	1	7	3
(China) S Sun	6	6
2	(Thailand) V Wongteanchai	2	3

Second round
5	(Australia) M Adamczak	6	6
(Japan) E Takao	2	2
(United Kingdom) E Webley-Smith	3	4
3	(China) Q Wang	6	6
6	(Japan) J Namigata	5	6	7^{8}
(United States) J Pegula	7	4	6^{6}
(Austria) N Hofmanova	2	6	7
(China) S Sun	6	4	5

Quarterfinals
5	(Australia) M Adamczak	6	6
3	(China) Q Wang	3	3
6	(Japan) J Namigata	6	6
(Austria) N Hofmanova	2	2

Semifinals
5	(Australia) M Adamczak	2	6	6
6	(Japan) J Namigata	6	4	4
