= 2011 Kurume Best Amenity International Women's Tennis =

- Date: 7–15 May
- Edition: 7th
- Location: Kurume, Japan

Champions

Singles
- (Japan) Rika Fujiwara

Doubles
- (Japan) Ayumi Oka / (Japan) Akiko Yonemura
| ← 2010 · | Kurume Best Amenity International Women's Tennis | · 2012 → |

The 2011 Kurume Best Amenity International Women's Tennis is a professional tennis tournament played on carpet courts. It is part of the 2011 ITF Women's Circuit. It took place in Kurume, Japan in 9 and 15 May 2011.

== Singles entrants ==
=== Seeds ===
| Country | Player | Rank^{1} | Seed |
|---|---|---|---|
| JPN | Junri Namigata | 109 | 1 |
| THA | Tamarine Tanasugarn | 130 | 2 |
| JPN | Erika Sema | 179 | 3 |
| KOR | Lee Jin-a | 191 | 4 |
| THA | Nudnida Luangnam | 218 | 5 |
| GBR | Katie O'Brien | 225 | 6 |
| NZL | Sacha Jones | 228 | 7 |
| KOR | Kim So-jung | 237 | 8 |

- Rankings are as of May 2, 2010.

=== Other entrants ===
The following players received wildcards into the singles main draw:

- (Japan) Yumi Miyazaki
- (Japan) Emi Mutaguchi
- (Japan) Aiko Nakamura
- (Japan) Yumi Nakano

The following players received entry from the qualifying draw:

- (Japan) Chinami Ogi
- (Japan) Akiko Omae
- (Thailand) Varatchaya Wongteanchai
- (Japan) Akiko Yonemura

The following players received entry by a lucky loser spot:

- (Japan) Akari Inoue
- (Japan) Hirono Watanabe

== Champions ==
=== Singles ===
(Japan) Rika Fujiwara def. (Australia) Monique Adamczak, 6–3, 6–1

=== Doubles ===
(Japan) Ayumi Oka / (Japan) Akiko Yonemura def. (Japan) Rika Fujiwara / (Thailand) Tamarine Tanasugarn 6–3, 5–7, [10–8]
