= 2012 Fukuoka International Women's Cup =

- Date: 7–13 May
- Edition: 12th
- Surface: Grass
- Location: Fukuoka, Japan

Champions

Singles
- (Australia) Casey Dellacqua

Doubles
- (Australia) Monique Adamczak / (Australia) Stephanie Bengson
← 2011 ·	Fukuoka International Women's Cup	· 2013 →

The 2012 Fukuoka International Women's Cup was a professional tennis tournament played on grass courts. It was the twelfth edition of the tournament which was part of the 2012 ITF Women's Circuit. It took place in Fukuoka, Japan, on 7–13 May 2012.

== WTA entrants ==
=== Seeds ===
Country	Player	Rank^{1}	Seed
THA	Tamarine Tanasugarn	84	1
AUS	Casey Dellacqua	109	2
JPN	Kurumi Nara	138	3
TPE	Chan Yung-jan	141	4
RUS	Marta Sirotkina	202	5
JPN	Misa Eguchi	217	6
CHN	Wang Qiang	222	7
JPN	Akiko Omae	225	8

- ^{1} Rankings as of 30 April 2012

=== Other entrants ===
The following players received wildcards into the singles main draw:

- (Japan) Miyu Kato
- (Japan) Makoto Ninomiya
- (Japan) Risa Ozaki
- (Japan) Akiko Yonemura

The following players received entry from the qualifying draw:

- (Japan) Shiho Akita
- (Kazakhstan) Zarina Diyas
- (Japan) Kazusa Ito
- (China) Sun Shengnan

The following players received entry as lucky losers:

- (Russia) Ksenia Lykina
- (Japan) Remi Tezuka

== Champions ==
=== Singles ===
- (Australia) Casey Dellacqua def. (Australia) Monique Adamczak 6–4, 6–1

=== Doubles ===
- (Australia) Monique Adamczak / (Australia) Stephanie Bengson def. (Japan) Misa Eguchi / (Japan) Akiko Omae 6–4, 6–4
