= Kōfu International Open =

Tournament information
- Event name: Kōfu International Open
- Location: Kōfu, Japan
- Venue: Yamanashi Gakuin Yokone Tennis Center
- Surface: Hard
- Website: kofuopen.estclub.co.jp
ATP Tour
- Category: ITF Men's Circuit
- Draw: 32S / 32Q / 16D
- Prize money: $15,000
WTA Tour
- Category: ITF Women's Circuit
- Draw: 32S / 32Q / 16D
- Prize money: $40,000

The Kōfu International Open is a tournament for professional female tennis players on outdoor hardcourts. The event is classified as a $40,000 ITF Women's Circuit. It had been held in Kōfu, Japan, since 2003. In 2011, it was a $50k women's event.

== Past finals ==
=== Women's singles ===
Year	Champion	Runner-up	Score
2026	(Belgium) Sofia Costoulas	(China) Ma Yexin	7–5, 6–3
2025	(Japan) Haruka Kaji	(Japan) Himeno Sakatsume	7–6^{(7–2)}, 6–3
2024	(United States) Catherine Harrison	(Chinese Taipei) Lee Ya-hsuan	6–7^{(8–10)}, 6–1, 6–1
2023	(South Korea) Jang Su-jeong	(South Korea) Han Na-lae	2–6, 6–3, 6–2
2020–22	cancelled due to the COVID-19 pandemic		
2019	(Chinese Taipei) Lee Hua-chen	(Germany) Stephanie Wagner	6–7^{(4–7)}, 6–3, 6–4
2018	(Thailand) Luksika Kumkhum	(Canada) Bianca Andreescu	6–3, 6–3
2017	(Japan) Mayo Hibi	(South Korea) Han Na-lae	5–7, 6–3, 6–2
2016	(Sweden) Susanne Celik	(China) Zhu Lin	7–6^{(7–3)}, 6–3
2015	(Japan) Miki Miyamura	(Japan) Aiko Yoshitomi	6–4, 6–2
2014	(Japan) Chiaki Okadaue	(Japan) Mana Ayukawa	3–6, 7–6^{(9–7)}, 6–2
2013	(Japan) Yuuki Tanaka	(Japan) Hiroko Kuwata	6–3, 6–1
2012	(Japan) Hiroko Kuwata	(China) Liu Fangzhou	6–4, 4–6, 7–6^{(9–7)}
2011	(Chinese Taipei) Chang Kai-chen	(Luxembourg) Mandy Minella	6–4, 1–6, 6–4
2010	(Japan) Sachie Ishizu	(Japan) Akiko Yonemura	1–6, 6–1, 6–0
2009	(Japan) Misaki Doi	(Japan) Erika Sema	7–5, 6–2

=== Women's doubles ===
Year	Champions	Runners-up	Score
2026	(Japan) Momoko Kobori (Japan) Ayano Shimizu	(China) Dang Yiming (China) You Xiaodi	6–4, 6–4
2025	(Japan) Momoko Kobori (Japan) Ayano Shimizu	(Japan) Akiko Omae (Japan) Eri Shimizu	6–1, 6–4
2024	(Japan) Erina Hayashi (Japan) Saki Imamura	(India) Rutuja Bhosale (India) Ankita Raina	6–3, 7–5
2023	(South Korea) Han Na-lae (South Korea) Jang Su-jeong	(Spain) Georgina García Pérez (Japan) Eri Hozumi	6–0, 6–4
2020–22	cancelled due to the COVID-19 pandemic		
2019	(Chinese Taipei) Chang Kai-chen (Chinese Taipei) Hsu Ching-wen	(United States) Emina Bektas (United Kingdom) Tara Moore	6–1, 6–3
2018	(China) Gao Xinyu (Thailand) Luksika Kumkhum	(Japan) Erina Hayashi (Japan) Momoko Kobori	6–0, 2–6, [10–4]
2017	(South Korea) Han Na-lae (Thailand) Luksika Kumkhum	(Japan) Erina Hayashi (Japan) Robu Kajitani	6–3, 6–0
2016	(Japan) Shuko Aoyama (Japan) Erina Hayashi	(Japan) Kanae Hisami (Japan) Kotomi Takahata	7–5, 7–5
2015	(Japan) Haruka Kaji (Japan) Aiko Yoshitomi	(Japan) Rika Fujiwara (Japan) Akari Inoue	6–2, 6–3
2014	(Japan) Nagi Hanatani (Japan) Hikari Yamamoto	(Japan) Riko Fujioka (Japan) Hayaka Murase	3–6, 6–2, [10–7]
2013	(Japan) Akari Inoue (Japan) Hiroko Kuwata	(South Korea) Han Na-lae (China) Yang Zi	3–6, 7–5, [10–7]
2012	(Japan) Ayumi Oka (Japan) Kotomi Takahata	(Japan) Eri Hozumi (Japan) Remi Tezuka	6–4, 5–7, [10–3]
2011	(Chinese Taipei) Chan Chin-wei (Chinese Taipei) Hsu Wen-hsin	(Japan) Remi Tezuka (Japan) Akiko Yonemura	6–3, 6–4
2010	(Japan) Maki Arai (Japan) Seiko Okamoto	(Japan) Shiho Hisamatsu (Japan) Maiko Inoue	6–4, 6–4
2009	(Japan) Shuko Aoyama (Japan) Akari Inoue	(Japan) Maki Arai (Japan) Miki Miyamura	7–5, 3–6, [10–8]

=== Men's singles ===
Year	Champion	Runner-up	Score
2020	cancelled due to the COVID-19 pandemic		
2019	(Japan) Jumpei Yamasaki	(Japan) Sho Shimabukuro	7–6^{(7–5)}, 6–3
2018	(South Korea) Hong Seong-chan	(Japan) Makoto Ochi	7–6^{(7–2)}, 6–1
2017	(Japan) Takuto Niki	(United States) Shane Vinsant	6–4, 4–0 ret.
2016	(South Korea) Lee Duck-hee	(Japan) Yuya Kibi	6–2, 6–3
2015	(South Korea) Lim Yong-kyu	(Japan) Yasutaka Uchiyama	7–6^{(8–6)}, 6–3
2014	(Japan) Takuto Niki	(Japan) Yusuke Watanuki	6–4, 6–2
2013	(China) Chang Yu	(South Korea) Nam Hyun-woo	6–2, 6–1
2012	(Japan) Hiroki Moriya	(Japan) Yasutaka Uchiyama	6–1, 6–4
2011	Not held		
2010	(Japan) Go Soeda	(Chinese Taipei) Yi Chu-huan	6–3, 6–4
2009	(South Korea) An Jae-sung	(Japan) Yūchi Sugita	5–7, 6–4, 7–6^{(7–5)}
2008	(Japan) Yaoki Ishii	(New Zealand) Daniel King-Turner	6–7^{(2–7)}, 6–3, 6–4
2007	(South Korea) Kwon Hyung-tae	(South Korea) An Jae-sung	7–5, 6–1
2006	(South Korea) Jun Woong-sun	(Japan) Tetsuya Chaen	7–6^{(7–4)}, 7–5
2005	(Japan) Satoshi Iwabuchi	(South Korea) Im Kyu-tae	6–2, 7–6^{(8–6)}
2004	(Japan) Michihisa Onoda	(Japan) Kentaro Masuda	6–3, 7–5
2003	(Japan) Takahiro Terachi	(Japan) Kentaro Masuda	6–2, 6–2

=== Men's doubles ===
Year	Champions	Runners-up	Score
2020	cancelled due to the COVID-19 pandemic		
2019	(Japan) Hiroyasu Ehara (Japan) Sho Katayama	(Australia) Blake Ellis (Australia) Michael Look	6–2, 6–4
2018	(Japan) Hiroyasu Ehara (Japan) Sho Katayama	(South Korea) Seol Jae-min (South Korea) Song Min-kyu	7–5, 7–6^{(7–5)}
2017	(Japan) Katsuki Nagao (Japan) Hiromasa Oku	(Japan) Yuichi Ito (Japan) Jumpei Yamasaki	6–4, 6–7^{(4–7)}, [10–3]
2016	(Japan) Shintaro Imai (Japan) Takuto Niki	(Japan) Yuya Kibi (Japan) Toshihide Matsui	6–1, 6–2
2015	(China) Gao Xin (China) Li Zhe	(Japan) Takashi Saito (Japan) Yusuke Watanuki	6–0, 6–7^{(4–7)}, [10–1]
2014	(Japan) Takuto Niki (Japan) Arata Onozawa	(Japan) Toshihide Matsui (Thailand) Danai Udomchoke	6–4, 6–2
2013	(Japan) Hiroki Kondo (Japan) Kento Takeuchi	(China) Chang Yu (South Korea) Kim Cheong-eui	6–1, 3–6, [10–7]
2012	(Chinese Taipei) Peng Hsien-yin (Japan) Bumpei Sato	(China) Chang Yu (China) Gao Xin	6–3, 5–7, [10–6]
2011	Not held		
2010	(Japan) Tasuku Iwami (Japan) Hiroki Kondo	(New Zealand) Mikal Statham (United States) Maciek Sykut	6–2, 6–3
2009	(Chinese Taipei) Yang Tsung-hua (Chinese Taipei) Yi Chu-huan	(Japan) Yuya Kibi (Japan) Tomohiro Shinokawa	6–1, 6–0
2008	(China) Gong Maoxin (China) Li Zhe	(New Zealand) G.D. Jones (New Zealand) Daniel King-Turner	6–1, 7–5
2007	(Japan) Akito Higa (Japan) Tomohiro Shinokawa	(South Korea) An Jae-sung (South Korea) Daniel Yoo	3–6, 6–4, 6–4
2006	(South Korea) Jun Woong-sun (South Korea) Kim Sun-yong	(United States) Minh Le (Japan) Hiroyasu Sato	6–2, 7–6^{(7–4)}
2005	(South Korea) Im Kyu-tae (South Korea) Kwon Oh-hee	(New Zealand) Mark Nielsen (Japan) Hiroyasu Sato	4–6, 7–6^{(7–3)}, 6–3
2004	(United States) Scott Lipsky (United States) David Martin	(New Zealand) Mark Nielsen (Japan) Michihisa Onoda	2–6, 7–5, 7–6^{(8–6)}
2003	(New Zealand) Robert Cheyne (New Zealand) Mark Nielsen	(Japan) Katsushi Fukuda (Sweden) Michael Ryderstedt	4–6, 6–4, 6–3
