= Vivien Silfany-Tony =

Indonesian tennis player

- Country (sports): Indonesia
- Born: 22 August 1989 (age 35); Palembang, Indonesia
- Turned pro: 2004
- Prize money: $9,885

Singles
- Career record: 17–26
- Career titles: 0
- Highest ranking: No. 723 (23 July 2007)

Doubles
- Career record: 42–28
- Career titles: 0 WTA, 2 ITF
- Highest ranking: No. 309 (30 July 2007)

Team competitions
- Fed Cup: 0–3

Vivien Silfany-Tony (born 22 August 1989) is an Indonesian former professional tennis player.

She made her debut as a professional in December 2004, aged 15, at an ITF tournament in Jakarta. She won two ITF doubles titles in 2007.

Silfany-Tony was part of the Indonesia Fed Cup team in 2008. Playing for Indonesia in Fed Cup, she has a win–loss record of 0–3.

== Career statistics ==
=== ITF finals ===
==== Doubles (2–4) ====
$50,000 tournaments
$25,000 tournaments
$10,000 tournaments

Result	Date	Tournament	Surface	Partner	Opponents	Score
Loss	20 September 2005	Jakarta, Indonesia	Hard	(Indonesia) Lutfiana-Aris Budiharto	(Chinese Taipei) Chen Yi (Chinese Taipei) Kao Shao-yuan	3–6, 0–6
Loss	20 March 2007	Kalgoorlie, Australia	Hard	(Indonesia) Lavinia Tananta	(Australia) Emily Hewson (Australia) Christina Wheeler	4–6, 3–6
Loss	30 April 2007	Jakarta, Indonesia	Hard	(Indonesia) Lavinia Tananta	(Philippines) Denise Dy (Indonesia) Jessy Rompies	0–6, 2–6
Win	8 May 2007	Tarakan, Indonesia	Hard	(Indonesia) Lavinia Tananta	(Japan) Tomoko Dokei (Japan) Tomoko Taira	6–2, 7–6^{(7–3)}
Loss	16 May 2007	Balikpapan, Indonesia	Hard	(Indonesia) Lavinia Tananta	(Indonesia) Septi Mende (Indonesia) Wukirasih Sawondari	6–3, 3–6, 4–6
Win	16 July 2007	Khon Kaen, Thailand	Hard	(Indonesia) Jessy Rompies	(South Korea) Kim Sun-jung (South Korea) Lee Cho-won	3–6, 6–1, 6–4
