= Lutfiana-Aris Budiharto =

Indonesian tennis player

- Country (sports): Indonesia
- Born: 31 August 1990 (age 34)
- Turned pro: 2004
- Prize money: $8,326

Singles
- Career record: 22–25
- Career titles: 0
- Highest ranking: No. 725 (13 August 2007)

Doubles
- Career record: 15–22
- Career titles: 0 WTA, 1 ITF
- Highest ranking: No. 734 (28 May 2007)

Lutfiana-Aris Budiharto (born 31 August 1990) is an Indonesian professional tennis player. She made her debut as a professional in 2004, at the age of 14, at an ITF tournament in Jakarta. Her first, and as yet only, tournament win came in 2008, when she and partner Beatrice Gumulya won an ITF tournament at Bulungan.

== ITF Circuit finals ==
=== Doubles (1–1) ===
$25,000 tournaments
$10,000 tournaments

Result	No.	Date	Tournament	Surface	Partner	Opponents	Score
Loss	1.	20 September 2005	Jakarta, Indonesia	Hard	(Indonesia) Vivien Silfany-Tony	(Chinese Taipei) Chen Yi (Chinese Taipei) Kao Shao-yuan	3–6, 0–6
Win	2.	12 May 2008	Bulungan, Indonesia	Hard	(Indonesia) Beatrice Gumulya	(Indonesia) Lavinia Tananta (China) Hao Jie	7–5, 4–6, [11–9]
