= 2012 Kurume Best Amenity International Women's Tennis =

- Date: 14–20 May
- Edition: 10th
- Surface: Grass
- Location: Kurume, Fukuoka, Japan

Champions

Singles
- (China) Zheng Saisai

Doubles
- (China) Han Xinyun / (China) Sun Shengnan
- Kurume Best Amenity International Women's Tennis

The 2012 Kurume Best Amenity International Women's Tennis was a professional tennis tournament played on grass courts. It was the tenth edition of the tournament which was part of the 2012 ITF Women's Circuit. It took place in Kurume, Fukuoka, Japan between 14 and 20 May 2012.

== WTA entrants ==
=== Seeds ===
Country	Player	Rank^{1}	Seed
RUS	Marta Sirotkina	198	1
THA	Varatchaya Wongteanchai	221	2
CHN	Wang Qiang	225	3
JPN	Akiko Omae	226	4
AUS	Monique Adamczak	232	5
JPN	Junri Namigata	236	6
CHN	Zheng Saisai	244	7
JPN	Aiko Nakamura	247	8

- ^{1} Rankings are as of May 7, 2012.

=== Other entrants ===
The following players received wildcards into the singles main draw:

- (Japan) Yumi Miyazaki
- (Japan) Yumi Nakano
- (Japan) Riko Sawayanagi
- (Japan) Akiko Yonemura

The following players received entry from the qualifying draw:

- (Japan) Kazusa Ito
- (Poland) Justyna Jegiołka
- (South Korea) Kim So-jung
- (Japan) Makoto Ninomiya

== Champions ==
=== Singles ===
- (China) Zheng Saisai def. (Australia) Monique Adamczak, 7–5, 6–2

=== Doubles ===
- (China) Han Xinyun / (China) Sun Shengnan def. (Russia) Ksenia Lykina / (United Kingdom) Melanie South, 6–1, 6–0
