= Chen Yi (tennis) =

Taiwanese tennis player

- Country (sports): Chinese Taipei
- Residence: Taipei, Taiwan
- Born: 12 November 1986 (age 39) Taipei
- Plays: Right (two-handed backhand)
- Prize money: $78,287

Singles
- Career record: 164–155
- Career titles: 0
- Highest ranking: No. 377 (16 April 2007)

Doubles
- Career record: 208–148
- Career titles: 18 ITF
- Highest ranking: No. 116 (19 October 2009)

Chen Yi
- Traditional Chinese: 陳宜
- Simplified Chinese: 陈宜
Transcriptions
Standard Mandarin
- Hanyu Pinyin: Chén Yí

Chen Yi (Chinese: 陳宜; born November 12, 1986) is a former professional Taiwanese tennis player.

On 16 April 2007, she reached a career-high ranking of 377 in singles. On 19 October 2009, she peaked at No. 116 in the doubles rankings.

In her career, she won 18 doubles titles on the ITF Circuit, her biggest at the Ningbo Challenger which was classified as $100k+H event.

She has played at WTA Tour level, before including a 4–6, 2–6 loss to eventual winners Serena and Venus Williams at the 2009 Silicon Valley Classic, partnering with Mashona Washington.

== ITF Circuit finals ==
Legend
$100,000 tournaments
$75,000 tournaments
$50,000 tournaments
$25,000 tournaments
$10,000 tournaments

=== Singles: 3 (0–3) ===
Outcome	No.	Date	Tournament	Surface	Opponent	Score
Runner-up	1.	2 May 2006	Jakarta, Indonesia	Hard	(Indonesia) Ayu Fani Damayanti	3–6, 3–6
Runner-up	2.	10 May 2006	Tarakan, Indonesia	Hard (i)	(China) Huang Lei	5–7, 4–6
Runner-up	3.	20 July 2007	Khon Kaen, Thailand	Hard	(Thailand) Nungnadda Wannasuk	3–6, 0–6

=== Doubles: 32 (18–14) ===
Outcome	No.	Date	Tournament	Surface	Partner	Opponents	Score
Runner-up	1.	20 April 2004	Hamanako, Japan	Carpet	(Chinese Taipei) Chan Chin-wei	(South Korea) Kim Hea-mi (South Korea) Keiko Taguchi	1–6, 1–6
Runner-up	2.	5 July 2004	Seoul, South Korea	Hard	(Chinese Taipei) Chan Chin-wei	(South Korea) Kim Mi-ok (South Korea) Lee Jin-a	4–6, 4–6
Winner	3.	20 September 2005	Jakarta, Indonesia	Hard	(Chinese Taipei) Kao Shao-yuan	(Indonesia) Lutfiana-Aris Budiharto (Indonesia) Vivien Silfany-Tony	6–3, 6–0
Winner	4.	26 September 2005	Balikpapan, Indonesia	Hard	(Chinese Taipei) Kao Shao-yuan	(Chinese Taipei) Hsu Wen-hsin (Chinese Taipei) Hwang I-hsuan	6–3, 7–5
Winner	5.	8 November 2005	Manila, Philippines	Hard	(Chinese Taipei) Kao Shao-yuan	(South Korea) Lim Sae-mi (South Korea) Lee Jin-a	6–4, 6–1
Runner-up	6.	15 November 2005	Manila, Philippines	Hard	(Chinese Taipei) Kao Shao-yuan	(Philippines) Denise Dy (United States) Riza Zalameda	2–6, 3–6
Winner	7.	15 May 2006	Taipei, Taiwan	Hard	(Chinese Taipei) Kao Shao-yuan	(Chinese Taipei) Lin Yu-ting (Chinese Taipei) Lu Yen-hua	6–2, 6–1
Runner-up	8.	30 May 2006	Tianjin, China	Hard	(Chinese Taipei) Chan Chin-wei	(China) Ji Chunmei (China) Sun Shengnan	6–3, 6–7^{(7)}, 1–6
Winner	9.	26 March 2007	Hyderabad, İndia	Hard	(China) Liu Wanting	(South Korea) Jeong A-cho (South Korea) Kim Ji-young	6–4, 6–1
Runner-up	10.	30 May 2007	Gunma, Japan	Carpet	(South Korea) Yoo Mi	(Japan) Kumiko Iijima (Japan) Akiko Yonemura	4–6, 4–6
Winner	11.	12 November 2007	Manila, Philippines	Hard	(Chinese Taipei) Kao Shao-yuan	(Indonesia) Ayu Fani Damayanti (Indonesia) Septi Mende	6–3, 7–5
Winner	12.	19 November 2007	Manila, Philippines	Hard	(Chinese Taipei) Kao Shao-yuan	(Japan) Ayumi Oka (Japan) Kei Sekine	7–6, 6–1
Runner-up	13.	11 April 2008	San Severo, Italy	Clay	(Romania) Laura-Ioana Andrei	(Italy) Benedetta Davato (Switzerland) Lisa Sabino	3–6, 6–7
Winner	14.	28 July 2008	Surakarta, Indonesia	Hard	(South Korea) Kim Jin-hee	(Indonesia) Sandy Gumulya (Indonesia) Lavinia Tananta	6–2, 6–4
Runner-up	15.	4 Aug 2008	Jakarta, Indonesia	Hard	(South Korea) Kim Jin-hee	(Indonesia) Liza Andriyani (Indonesia) Angelique Widjaja	3–6, 1–6
Winner	16.	11 August 2008	Chiang Mai, Thailand	Hard	(China) Chen Yanchong	(Thailand) Sophia Mulsap (Thailand) Varatchaya Wongteanchai	7–5, 6–3
Winner	17.	8 September 2008	Nato, Japan	Carpet	(Chinese Taipei) Chan Chin-wei	(Japan) Tomoko Dokei (Japan) Yuko Kurata	6–3, 6–2
Runner-up	18.	27 October 2008	Tokyo, Japan	Hard	(Chinese Taipei) Chan Chin-wei	(Japan) Kimiko Date-Krumm (Japan) Rika Fujiwara	5–7, 3–6
Winner	19.	9 February 2009	Midland, United States	Hard (i)	(Japan) Rika Fujiwara	(United States) Lindsay Lee-Waters (Hungary) Melinda Czink	7–5, 7–6
Winner	20.	10 April 2009	Monzón, Spain	Hard	(Serbia) Vesna Dolonc	(Italy) Alberta Brianti (Georgia (country)) Margalita Chakhnashvili	2–6, 6–4, [10–8]
Winner	21.	20 April 2009	Changwon, South Korea	Hard	(Chinese Taipei) Chang Kai-chen	(United Kingdom) Elena Baltacha (United Kingdom) Amanda Elliott	6–4, 6–1
Winner	22.	27 April 2009	Gimcheon, South Korea	Hard	(Chinese Taipei) Chang Kai-chen	(South Korea) Chang Kyung-mi (South Korea) Lee Jin-a	6–1, 7–5
Winner	23.	28 June 2010	Nonthaburi, Thailand	Hard	(Thailand) Varatchaya Wongteanchai	(South Korea) Kim Kun-hee (South Korea) Yu Min-hwa	6–2, 6–2
Winner	24.	5 July 2010	Pattaya, Thailand	Hard	(Japan) Sakiko Shimizu	(Indonesia) Jessy Rompies (Thailand) Varatchaya Wongteanchai	6–3, 7–6^{(2)}
Runner-up	25.	30 August 2010	Tsukuba, Japan	Hard	(Chinese Taipei) Chan Chin-wei	(Japan) Kumiko Iijima (Japan) Akiko Yonemura	6–4, 6–7^{(6)}, [7–10]
Winner	26.	27 September 2010	Ningbo, China	Hard	(Chinese Taipei) Chan Chin-wei	(United States) Jill Craybas (Ukraine) Olga Savchuk	6–3, 3–6, [10–8]
Runner-up	27.	4 October 2010	Nonthaburi, Thailand	Hard	(Thailand) Varatchaya Wongteanchai	(Thailand) Peangtarn Plipuech (Thailand) Nungnadda Wannasuk	5–7, 7–6^{(4)}, [9–11]
Winner	28.	11 October 2010	Pattaya, Thailand	Hard	(Thailand) Varatchaya Wongteanchai	(Chinese Taipei) Juan Ting-fei (China) Zhu Lin	7–5, 6–2
Runner-up	29.	12 December 2010	Bangalore, India	Hard	(Japan) Kumiko Iijima	(Thailand) Luksika Kumkhum (Thailand) Nungnadda Wannasuk	6–7^{(7)}, 7–5, [8–10]
Runner-up	30.	13 August 2011	Taipei, Taiwan	Hard	(Chinese Taipei) Chan Hao-ching	(Chinese Taipei) Kao Shao-yuan (Thailand) Peangtarn Plipuech	3–6, 4–6
Runner-up	31.	13 May 2013	Balikpapan, Indonesia	Hard	(China) Xu Yifan	(United Kingdom) Naomi Broady (Serbia) Teodora Mirčić	3–6, 3–6
Runner-up	32.	3 November 2013	Taipei, Taiwan	Hard	(Thailand) Luksika Kumkhum	(Netherlands) Lesley Kerkhove (Netherlands) Arantxa Rus	4–6, 6–2, [12–14]
