= Stephanie Bengson =

Australian tennis player

- Country (sports): Australia
- Born: 31 January 1987 (age 39) Wollongong, Australia
- Height: 1.80 m (5 ft 11 in)
- Turned pro: 8 January 2012
- Plays: Right-handed (two-handed backhand)
- Prize money: $37,245
- Official website: stephaniebengson.com

Singles
- Career record: 36–46
- Career titles: 0
- Highest ranking: No. 541 (8 October 2012)

Doubles
- Career record: 56–48
- Career titles: 4 ITF
- Highest ranking: No. 154 (11 June 2012)

Grand Slam doubles results
- Australian Open: 1R (2012, 2013)

Stephanie Bengson (born 31 January 1987) is an Australian former tennis player. Her career has developed more in doubles than singles. Her highest singles ranking is No. 541, achieved in October 2012. Her highest doubles ranking is No. 154, achieved in June 2012.

== Career ==
=== 2005–2008 ===
Bengson played collegiate D1 tennis at Long Beach State. She was the Big West Conference Freshman of the Year in 2005 and first team All-Big West honoree three times. A member of four League Championship and NCAA post-season teams, Bengson earned a collegiate career-high No. 31 in doubles and No. 115 national ranking. She was a key part of the 2008 team that achieved Long Beach's highest ever team ranking at No. 18 in the ITA rankings.

=== 2011 ===
Bengson won three doubles titles on tournaments of the ITF Women's Circuit in 2011.

=== 2012 ===
Bengson started her year playing at the Premier-level tournament in Sydney. She and Tyra Calderwood fell in the first round to Maria Kirilenko and Nadia Petrova. She and Calderwood then received a wildcard into the Australian Open, but they also fell in the first round to Eva Birnerová and Alberta Brianti. This was Stephanie's first Grand Slam performance.

In May, Bengson went back to the ITF Circuit, competing in a string of Japanese Challengers. She won her biggest title yet at the $50k-level tournament in Fukuoka in May, winning the doubles event with fellow Australian, Monique Adamczak. She then went to compete in the WTA International event, a week before Roland Garros in Strasbourg. She played alongside Adamczak in the doubles event and reached her first ever WTA Tour quarterfinal. The pair defeated Slovak duo Lenka Juríková and Kristína Kučová in the first round, and fell in the quarterfinals to Alexandra Cadanțu and Anne Keothavong.

=== Before the tour ===
Bengson played from 2005 to 2008 at nationally ranked Long Beach State. She was twice named first team all conference in both singles and doubles while earning career-high national rankings of No. 31 in doubles and 115 in singles during her senior season. Her team won the Big West Conference title and advanced to the NCAA's all four seasons she played at Long Beach State, including a No. 18 team-ranking during 2006. She graduated in 2008.

== ITF Circuit finals ==
=== Doubles (4–7) ===
$50,000 tournaments
$25,000 tournaments
$10,000 tournaments

| Outcome | No. | Date | Tournament | Surface | Partner | Opponents | Score |
|---|---|---|---|---|---|---|---|
| Runner-up | 1. | 15 August 2011 | ITF Todi, Italy | Clay | (United States) Kirsten Flower | (Italy) Federica Di Sarra (Italy) Angelica Moratelli | 6–7, 5–7 |
| Runner-up | 2. | 22 August 2011 | ITF Bagnatica, Italy | Clay | (United States) Kirsten Flower | (Italy) Alice Balducci (Italy) Benedetta Davato | 4–6, 7–6^{(8)}, [10–12] |
| Runner-up | 3. | 19 September 2011 | ITF Darwin, Australia | Hard | (Australia) Tyra Calderwood | (Brazil) Maria Fernanda Alves (United Kingdom) Samantha Murray | 4–6, 2–6 |
| Winner | 4. | 31 October 2011 | ITF Mount Gambier, Australia | Hard | (Australia) Tyra Calderwood | (Australia) Isabella Holland (Australia) Sally Peers | w/o |
| Winner | 5. | 14 November 2011 | ITF Traralgon, Australia | Hard | (Australia) Tyra Calderwood | (Australia) Monique Adamczak (Australia) Bojana Bobusic | 6–7^{(2)}, 6–1, [10–8] |
| Winner | 6. | 21 November 2011 | Bendigo International, Australia | Hard | (Australia) Tyra Calderwood | (Australia) Storm Sanders (United Kingdom) Samantha Murray | 2–6, 6–1, [10–5] |
| Runner-up | 7. | 4 February 2012 | Burnie International, Australia | Hard | (Australia) Tyra Calderwood | (Australia) Arina Rodionova (United Kingdom) Melanie South | 2–6, 2–6 |
| Runner-up | 8. | 20 February 2012 | ITF Mildura, Australia | Grass | (Australia) Tyra Calderwood | (Bosnia and Herzegovina) Mervana Jugić-Salkić (Russia) Ksenia Lykina | 7–5, 5–7, [7–10] |
| Winner | 9. | 7 May 2012 | Fukuoka International, Japan | Carpet | (Australia) Monique Adamczak | (Japan) Misa Eguchi (Japan) Akiko Omae | 6–4, 6–4 |
| Runner-up | 10. | 23 September 2012 | ITF Port Pirie, Australia | Hard | (South Africa) Chanel Simmonds | (Australia) Sacha Jones (Australia) Sally Peers | 4–6, 2–6 |
| Runner-up | 11. | 2 November 2013 | Bendigo International, Australia | Hard | (Australia) Sally Peers | (Australia) Monique Adamczak (Australia) Olivia Rogowska | 3–6, 6–2, [9–11] |
