= Kao Shao-yuan =

Taiwanese tennis player

Kao Shao-yuan 高紹媛
- Country (sports): Chinese Taipei
- Born: 11 June 1988 (age 37); Taipei, Taiwan
- Retired: 2014
- Plays: Right (two-handed backhand)
- Prize money: $33,908

Singles
- Career record: 42–80
- Highest ranking: No. 630 (4 December 2006)

Doubles
- Career record: 174–111
- Career titles: 18 ITF
- Highest ranking: No. 213 (6 June 2011)

Kao Shao-yuan
- Traditional Chinese: 高紹媛
- Simplified Chinese: 高绍媛
Transcriptions
Standard Mandarin
- Hanyu Pinyin: Gāo Shàoyuàn

Kao Shao-yuan (Chinese: 高紹媛; born 11 June 1988) is a former professional Taiwanese tennis player.

In her career, she won 18 doubles titles on the ITF Women's Circuit. Kao has a career-high doubles ranking by the Women's Tennis Association (WTA) of 213, achieved on 6 June 2011. She also has a career-high WTA singles ranking of 630.

In 2014, she played her last match on the pro circuit.

== ITF finals ==
Legend
$50,000 tournaments
$25,000 tournaments
$10,000 tournaments

=== Singles (0–1) ===
Outcome	No.	Date	Tournament	Surface	Opponent	Score
Runner-up	1.	19 November 2006	ITF Manila, Philippines	Hard	(United States) Maureen Diaz	0–6, 0–6

=== Doubles (18–12) ===
Outcome	No.	Date	Tournament	Surface	Partner	Opponents	Score
Winner	1.	20 September 2005	ITF Jakarta, Indonesia	Hard	(Chinese Taipei) Chen Yi	(Indonesia) Lutfiana-Aris Budiharto (Indonesia) Vivien Silfany-Tony	6–3, 6–0
Winner	2.	26 September 2005	ITF Balikpapan, Indonesia	Hard	(Chinese Taipei) Chen Yi	(Chinese Taipei) Hsu Wen-hsin (Chinese Taipei) Hwang I-hsuan	6–3, 7–5
Winner	3.	8 November 2005	ITF Manila, Philippines	Hard	(Chinese Taipei) Chen Yi	(South Korea) Lim Sae-mi (South Korea) Lee Jin-a	6–4, 6–1
Runner-up	4.	15 November 2005	Manila, Philippines	Hard	(Chinese Taipei) Chen Yi	(Philippines) Denise Dy (United States) Riza Zalameda	2–6, 3–6
Winner	5.	15 May 2006	Taipei, Taiwan	Hard	(Chinese Taipei) Chen Yi	(Chinese Taipei) Lin Yu-ting (Chinese Taipei) Lu Yen-hua	6–2, 6–1
Winner	6.	12 November 2006	Manila, Philippines	Hard	(Thailand) Thassha Vitayaviroj	(South Korea) Kim Jung-eun (South Korea) Lim Sae-mi	6–2, 7–5
Runner-up	7.	19 November 2006	Manila, Philippines	Hard	(Thailand) Thassha Vitayaviroj	(Thailand) Noppawan Lertcheewakarn (Thailand) Varatchaya Wongteanchai	6–3, 3–6, 6–7^{(2)}
Winner	8.	20 May 2007	Changwon, South Korea	Hard	(Chinese Taipei) Chan Chin-wei	(Indonesia) Romana Tedjakusuma (Thailand) Napaporn Tongsalee	6–4, 6–4
Winner	9.	12 November 2007	Manila, Philippines	Hard	(Chinese Taipei) Chen Yi	(Indonesia) Ayu Fani Damayanti (Indonesia) Septi Mende	6–3, 7–5
Winner	10.	19 November 2007	Manila, Philippines	Hard	(Chinese Taipei) Chen Yi	(Japan) Ayumi Oka (Japan) Kei Sekine	7–6, 6–1
Runner-up	11.	17 November 2008	Manila, Philippines	Hard	(China) Zheng Junyi	(Indonesia) Jessy Rompies (Indonesia) Lavinia Tananta	1–6, 7–5, [8–10]
Winner	12.	9 February 2009	Jiangmen, China	Hard	(China) Hao Jie	(China) Zhang Shuai (China) Xie Yanze	6–0, 7–5
Runner-up	13.	5 July 2009	Xiamen, China	Hard	(China) Han Xinyun	(China) Lu Jingjing (China) Sun Shengnan	2–6, 4–6
Winner	14.	16 August 2009	Guanzhou, China	Hard	(China) Han Xinyun	(China) Hao Jie (China) Sun Tiantian	1–6, 6–2, [10–6]
Runner-up	15.	9 July 2010	Fuzhou, China	Hard	(Japan) Ayaka Maekawa	(China) Liu Shaozhuo (China) Xu Yifan	6–3, 1–6, [2–10]
Runner-up	16.	7 August 2010	Balikpapan, Indonesia	Hard	(Chinese Taipei) Chan Hao-ching	(Indonesia) Ayu-Fani Damayanti (Indonesia) Lavinia Tananta	4–6, 5–7
Runner-up	17.	26 September 2010	Makinohara, Japan	Carpet	(China) Wang Qiang	(China) Lu Jiajing (China) Lu Jiaxiang	5–7, 6–1, [9–11]
Runner-up	18.	28 September 2010	Hamanako, Japan	Clay	(Japan) Ayaka Maekawa	(Japan) Erika Sema (Japan) Kumiko Iijima	2–6, 1–6
Winner	19.	31 October 2010	Taipei, Taiwan	Hard (i)	(Chinese Taipei) Wang Qiang	(Chinese Taipei) Juan Ting-fei (China) Zheng Saisai	6–3, 7–6^{(2)}
Runner-up	20.	11 April 2011	Incheon, South Korea	Hard	(Thailand) Varatchaya Wongteanchai	(South Korea) Han Sung-hee (South Korea) Hong Hyun-hui	3–6, 6–7^{(3)}
Winner	21.	10 June 2011	Taipei, Taiwan	Hard	(Chinese Taipei) Chan Chin-wei	(Chinese Taipei) Tsao Fang-chi (Chinese Taipei) Yang Chia-hsien	6–3, 6–2
Winner	22.	17 June 2011	Taipei, Taiwan	Hard	(Chinese Taipei) Chan Chin-wei	(Chinese Taipei) Hsieh Shu-ying (Chinese Taipei) Juan Ting-fei	6–1, 7–5
Winner	23.	14 August 2011	Taipei, Taiwan	Hard	(Thailand) Peangtarn Plipuech	(Chinese Taipei) Chan Hao-ching (Chinese Taipei) Chen Yi	6–3, 6–4
Runner-up	24.	2 October 2011	Jakarta, Indonesia	Hard	(China) Zhao Yijing	(Thailand) Nicha Lertpitaksinchai (Thailand) Nungnadda Wannasuk	4–6, 4–6
Winner	25.	14 January 2012	Pingguo, China	Hard	(China) Zhao Yijing	(China) Liang Chen (China) Tian Ran	3–6, 7–6^{(3)}, [10–7]
Winner	26.	9 June 2012	Taipei, Taiwan	Hard	(Chinese Taipei) Lee Hua-chen	(Chinese Taipei) Lee Ya-hsuan (Chinese Taipei) Hsu Ching-wen	6–3, 6–3
Runner-up	27.	27 October 2012	Taipei, Taiwan	Hard	(Chinese Taipei) Lee Hua-chen	(Chinese Taipei) Chan Chin-wei (France) Caroline Garcia	6–4, 4–6, [6–10]
Runner-up	28.	14 April 2013	Pelham, United States	Hard	(Chinese Taipei) Lee Hua-chen	(Australia) Ashleigh Barty (Australia) Arina Rodionova	4–6, 2–6
Winner	29.	9 June 2013	Taipei, Taiwan	Hard	(Chinese Taipei) Lee Hua-chen	(Chinese Taipei) Hsu Wen-hsin (Chinese Taipei) Chan Chin-wei	4–6, 6–3, [10–7]
Winner	30.	22 June 2014	Taipei, Taiwan	Hard	(Chinese Taipei) Lee Pei-chi	(Japan) Mai Minokoshi (Japan) Akiko Omae	6–1, 6–4
