= Natsumi Hamamura =

Japanese tennis player (born 1984)

Natsumi Hamamura 浜村 夏美
- Country (sports): Japan
- Born: 29 June 1984 (age 41) Kagoshima Prefecture
- Turned pro: 2002
- Plays: Right (two-handed both sides)
- Prize money: $98,866

Singles
- Career record: 144–151
- Career titles: 3 ITF
- Highest ranking: No. 203 (25 February 2008)

Grand Slam singles results
- Australian Open: Q1 (2008)
- French Open: Q1 (2008)
- Wimbledon: Q1 (2008)

Doubles
- Career record: 128–98
- Career titles: 9 ITF
- Highest ranking: No. 194 (20 August 2007)

Natsumi Hamamura (浜村 夏美, Hanamura Natsumi; born 29 June 1984) is a Japanese former professional tennis player.

Hamamura has a career-high singles ranking of world No. 203, achieved on 25 February 2008. On 20 August 2007, she peaked at No. 194 in the WTA doubles rankings. In her career, she won three singles titles and nine doubles titles on the ITF Women's Circuit.

Hamamura made her WTA Tour main-draw debut at the 2010 Japan Women's Open, in the doubles event partnering Miki Miyamura.

== ITF finals ==
=== Singles (3–3) ===
Legend $50,000 tournaments $25,000 tournaments $10,000 tournaments	Finals by surface Hard (1–1) Clay (2–0) Carpet (0–2)

Outcome	No.	Date	Location	Surface	Opponent	Score
Winner	1.	7 November 2004	Sutama, Japan	Clay	(France) Florence Haring	3–6, 6–3, 7–5
Runner-up	1.	5 February 2006	Taupō, New Zealand	Hard	(New Zealand) Leanne Baker	1–6, 2–6
Runner-up	2.	21 May 2007	Nagano, Japan	Carpet	(Japan) Rika Fujiwara	5–7, 2–6
Runner-up	3.	3 June 2007	Gunma, Japan	Carpet	(Japan) Kumiko Iijima	6–3, 3–6, 6–7^{(3–7)}
Winner	2.	3 May 2010	Bundaberg, Australia	Hard	(Australia) Sally Peers	6–0, 6–4
Winner	3.	23 May 2010	Karuizawa, Japan	Clay	(China) Xu Yifan	6–1, 6–2

=== Doubles (9–9) ===
Legend $50,000 tournaments $25,000 tournaments $10,000 tournaments	Finals by surface Hard (4–4) Clay (0–1) Carpet (5–4)

Outcome	No.	Date	Tournament	Surface	Partner	Opponents	Score
Winner	1.	10 September 2006	Kyoto, Japan	Carpet	(Japan) Ayaka Maekawa	(Japan) Maki Arai (Japan) Yukiko Yabe	6–4, 6–2
Runner-up	1.	23 September 2006	Ibaraki, Japan	Hard	(Japan) Ayaka Maekawa	(Japan) Kumiko Iijima (Japan) Junri Namigata	7–6^{(7–4)}, 3–6, 2–6
Runner-up	2.	16 February 2007	Melbourne, Australia	Clay	(Japan) Ayumi Morita	(Chinese Taipei) Hwang I-hsuan (South Korea) Lee Ye-ra	2–6, 1–6
Winner	2.	6 May 2007	Chengdu, China	Hard	(China) Song Shanshan	(China) Chen Yanchong (China) Liu Wanting	7–5, 4–6, 6–2
Winner	3.	27 May 2007	Nagano, Japan	Carpet	(Japan) Ayaka Maekawa	(Japan) Mari Tanaka (Japan) Akiko Yonemura	7–6^{(7–2)}, 6–3
Runner-up	3.	19 June 2007	Noto, Japan	Carpet	(Japan) Mari Tanaka	(United States) Anne Yelsey (Australia) Sophie Ferguson	6–7^{(8–10)}, 1–6
Runner-up	4.	10 July 2007	Miyazaki, Japan	Carpet	(Japan) Ayaka Maekawa	(China) Zhang Shuai (China) Zhao Yijing	4–6, 4–6
Runner-up	5.	22 September 2007	Tsukuba, Japan	Hard	(Japan) Ayaka Maekawa	(Japan) Ayumi Oka (Japan) Tomoko Sugano	2–6, 3–6
Runner-up	6.	10 March 2008	Kalgoorlie, Australia	Hard	(Japan) Remi Tezuka	(China) Li Ting (China) Zhou Yimiao	1–6, 6–4, [8–10]
Winner	4.	23 June 2008	Qianshan, China	Hard	(Japan) Remi Tezuka	(Japan) Yuka Kuroda (Japan) Tomoko Sugano	6–4, 6–0
Winner	5.	19 October 2008	Makinohara, Japan	Carpet	(Japan) Junri Namigata	(South Korea) Chae Kyung-yee (China) Han Xinyun	7–5, 7–6^{(7–4)}
Winner	6.	2 August 2009	Obihiro, Japan	Carpet	(Japan) Ayumi Oka	(Japan) Rika Fujiwara (Japan) Kurumi Nara	3–6, 6–1, [10–5]
Winner	7.	4 February 2011	Burnie International, Australia	Hard	(Japan) Erika Takao	(Australia) Olivia Rogowska (Australia) Sally Peers	6–2, 3–6, [10–7]
Runner-up	7.	22 May 2011	Karuizawa, Japan	Carpet (i)	(Japan) Ayumi Oka	(Japan) Rika Fujiwara (Japan) Shuko Aoyama	4–6, 4–6
Winner	8.	24 May 2011	Niigata, Japan	Hard	(Japan) Erika Sema	(Japan) Akari Inoue (Japan) Ayumi Oka	6–1, 6–2
Runner-up	8.	19 June 2011	Balikpapan, Indonesia	Hard	(Japan) Yurika Sema	(Japan) Kanae Hisami (Thailand) Varatchaya Wongteanchai	3–6, 2–6
Runner-up	9.	11 September 2011	Noto, Japan	Carpet	(Japan) Ayumi Oka	(Japan) Kanae Hisami (Thailand) Varatchaya Wongteanchai	6–1, 6–7^{(4–7)}, [12–14]
Winner	9.	30 October 2011	Hamanako, Japan	Carpet	(Japan) Ayumi Oka	(Vietnam) Huỳnh Phương Đài Trang (Thailand) Varatchaya Wongteanchai	6–3, 6–3
