= Hsu Wen-hsin =

Taiwanese tennis player

Hsu Wen-hsin 許文馨
- Country (sports): Chinese Taipei
- Born: 13 June 1988 (age 38) Taipei
- Plays: Right-handed (two-handed backhand)
- Prize money: $102,995

Singles
- Career record: 193–145
- Career titles: 2 ITF
- Highest ranking: No. 221 (15 May 2006)

Doubles
- Career record: 123–101
- Career titles: 6 ITF
- Highest ranking: No. 180 (7 May 2012)

Hsu Wen-hsin
- Traditional Chinese: 許文馨
- Simplified Chinese: 许文馨
Transcriptions
Standard Mandarin
- Hanyu Pinyin: Xǔ Wénxīn

Hsu Wen-hsin (Chinese: 許文馨; born 13 April 1988) is a Taiwanese former tennis player.

Hsu won two singles titles and six doubles titles on the ITF Women's Circuit. On 15 May 2006, she reached her best singles ranking of world No. 221. On 7 May 2012, she peaked at No. 180 in the WTA doubles rankings.

Hsu won her first $50k title at the 2011 Kōfu International Open, partnering with Chan Chin-wei to defeat Remi Tezuka and Akiko Yonemura in the final.

Playing for Taiwan in the Fed Cup, Hsu reached a win–loss record of 5–1.

== ITF finals ==
=== Singles (2–6) ===
Legend $50,000 tournaments $25,000 tournaments $10,000 tournaments	Finals by surface Hard (2–3) Clay (0–1) Carpet (0–2)

Result	No.	Date	Tournament	Surface	Opponent	Score
Loss	1.	22 November 2003	ITF Tainan, Taiwan	Clay	(Chinese Taipei) Chan Chin-wei	7–5, 4–6, 4–6
Loss	2.	30 October 2004	ITF Taipei, Taiwan	Hard	(Chinese Taipei) Chan Yung-jan	5–7, 3–6
Loss	3.	22 May 2005	ITF Ho Chi Minh City, Vietnam	Hard	(Indonesia) Wynne Prakusya	4–6, 1–6
Loss	4.	21 August 2005	ITF Nanjing, China	Hard	(Japan) Miho Saeki	2–6, 2–6
Win	1.	2 October 2005	ITF Balikpapan, Indonesia	Hard	(Chinese Taipei) Hwang I-hsuan	6–3, 7–6^{4}
Loss	5.	20 September 2008	ITF Kyoto, Japan	Carpet (i)	(Japan) Ayaka Maekawa	5–7, 4–6
Loss	6.	31 May 2009	ITF Gunma, Japan	Carpet	(Japan) Junri Namigata	1–6, 1–6
Win	2.	29 August 2010	ITF Saitama, Japan	Hard	(China) Duan Yingying	1–6, 6–1, 3–6

=== Doubles (6–8) ===
Legend $100,000 tournaments $75,000 tournaments $50,000 tournaments $25,000 tournaments $10,000 tournaments	Finals by surface Hard (4–6) Clay (0–1) Grass (0–0) Carpet (2–1)

Result	No.	Date	Tournament	Surface	Partner	Opponents	Score
Loss	1.	2 October 2005	ITF Balikpapan, Indonesia	Clay	(Chinese Taipei) Hwang I-hsuan	(Chinese Taipei) Chen Yi (Chinese Taipei) Kao Shao-yuan	3–6, 5–7
Loss	2.	13 November 2005	ITF Shenzhen, China	Hard	(Chinese Taipei) Chan Chin-wei	(Chinese Taipei) Hsieh Su-wei (China) Yan Zi	0–6, 2–6
Loss	3.	15 January 2006	ITF Tampa, United States	Hard	(Chinese Taipei) Chan Chin-wei	(South Africa) Chanelle Scheepers (United States) Aleke Tsoubanos	6–3, 6–7^{4}, 3–6
Win	1.	31 August 2008	ITF Saitama, Japan	Hard	(Chinese Taipei) Hwang I-hsuan	(Japan) Airi Hagimoto (Japan) Miyabi Inoue	6–4, 6–3
Loss	4.	26 October 2008	Taipei Open, Taiwan	Carpet (i)	(Chinese Taipei) Hwang I-hsuan	(Chinese Taipei) Chuang Chia-jung (Chinese Taipei) Hsieh Su-wei	3–6, 3–6
Win	2.	31 May 2009	ITF Gunma, Japan	Carpet	(Japan) Mari Tanaka	(Japan) Erika Sema (Japan) Yurika Sema	6–3, 1–6, [10–7]
Loss	5.	6 September 2009	ITF Tsukuba, Japan	Hard	(Japan) Mari Tanaka	(Bolivia) María Fernanda Álvarez Terán (United Kingdom) Jade Curtis	6–1, 2–6, [2–10]
Win	3.	13 September 2009	ITF Noto, Japan	Carpet	(Chinese Taipei) Hwang I-hsuan	(China) Han Xinyun (South Korea) Kim So-jung	6–3, 1–6, [11–9]
Loss	6.	20 March 2011	ITF Sanya, China	Hard	(Japan) Rika Fujiwara	(France) Iryna Brémond (Croatia) Ani Mijačika	6–3, 5–7, [10–12]
Win	4.	4 September 2011	ITF Tsukuba, Japan	Hard	(Chinese Taipei) Chan Chin-wei	(South Korea) Kim So-jung (Japan) Erika Takao	6–1, 6–1
Win	5.	8 October 2011	Kōfu International Open, Japan	Hard	(Chinese Taipei) Chan Chin-wei	(Japan) Remi Tezuka (Japan) Akiko Yonemura	6–3, 6–4
Loss	7.	6 May 2012	Kangaroo Cup, Japan	Hard	(Chinese Taipei) Chan Chin-wei	(United States) Jessica Pegula (China) Zheng Saisai	4–6, 6–3, [4–10]
Loss	8.	9 June 2013	ITF Taipei, Taiwan	Hard	(Chinese Taipei) Chan Chin-wei	(Chinese Taipei) Kao Shao-yuan (Chinese Taipei) Lee Hua-chen	6–4, 3–6, [7–10]
Win	6.	1 September 2013	ITF Tsukuba, Japan	Hard	(Chinese Taipei) Chan Chin-wei	(Chinese Taipei) Lee Ya-hsuan (Japan) Yumi Miyazaki	6–2, 6–1
