= Ayumi Oka (tennis) =

Japanese tennis player (born 1986)

- Country (sports): Japan
- Born: 13 March 1986 (age 40) Hyogo, Japan
- Plays: Right (two-handed backhand)
- Prize money: $89,103

Singles
- Career record: 154–144
- Career titles: 2 ITF
- Highest ranking: No. 297 (15 June 2009)

Doubles
- Career record: 148–114
- Career titles: 13 ITF
- Highest ranking: No. 219 (7 July 2010)

Ayumi Oka (岡あゆみ, Oka Ayumi; born 13 March 1986) is a Japanese former professional tennis player. Most time of her career, she played on the ITF Women's Circuit.

In June 2009, she reached her highest singles ranking of 297 by the Women's Tennis Association (WTA). In July 2010, she reached her best WTA doubles ranking of 219.

== ITF Circuit finals ==
$100,000 tournaments
$75,000 tournaments
$50,000 tournaments
$25,000 tournaments
$10,000 tournaments

=== Singles (2–0) ===
Outcome	No.	Date	Tournament	Surface	Opponent	Score
Winner	1.	9 September 2007	ITF Kyoto, Japan	Carpet (i)	(Japan) Haruka Fujishiro	6–1, 4–6, 6–3
Winner	2.	22 August 2011	ITF Saitama, Japan	Hard	(China) Duan Yingying	6–3, 6–4

=== Doubles (13–10) ===
Outcome	No.	Date	Tournament	Surface	Partner	Opponents	Score
Winner	1.	12 June 2005	ITF Tokyo, Japan	Hard	(Japan) Natsuko Kurita	(Japan) Nozomi Aiba (Japan) Kana Okawa	6–3, 6–4
Winner	2.	4 June 2007	ITF Tokyo, Japan	Hard	(Japan) Mari Tanaka	(Japan) Tomoko Taira (Japan) Etsuko Kitazaki	3–6, 6–1, 6–4
Winner	3.	22 July 2007	Kurume Cup, Japan	Grass	(Japan) Tomoko Sugano	(China) Liu Wanting (China) Song Shanshan	6–4, 6–1
Winner	4.	22 September 2007	Tsukuba, Japan	Hard	(Japan) Tomoko Sugano	(Japan) Natsumi Hamamura (Japan) Ayaka Maekawa	6–2, 6–3
Runner-up	5.	19 November 2007	Manila, Philippines	Hard	(Japan) Kei Sekine	(Chinese Taipei) Chen Yi (Chinese Taipei) Kao Shao-yuan	6–7^{(5–7)}, 1–6
Runner-up	6.	3 May 2008	Balikpapan, Indonesia	Hard	(Japan) Tomoko Sugano	(Indonesia) Sandy Gumulya (Indonesia) Lavinia Tananta	3–6, 6–4, [7–10]
Winner	7.	22 June 2008	Sutama, Japan	Clay	(Japan) Ayaka Maekawa	(Japan) Kazusa Ito (Japan) Tomoko Taira	6–3, 6–4
Runner-up	8.	13 July 2008	Tokyo, Japan	Carpet	(Thailand) Varatchaya Wongteanchai	(South Korea) Chang Kyung-mi (South Korea) Chae Kyung-yee	6–3, 2–6, [7–10]
Winner	9.	20 September 2008	Kyoto, Japan	Carpet (i)	(Thailand) Varatchaya Wongteanchai	(Japan) Maki Arai (Japan) Yurina Koshino	5–7, 6–2, [10–2]
Runner-up	10.	1 June 2009	Komoro, Japan	Clay	(Thailand) Varatchaya Wongteanchai	(China) Zhang Shuai (China) Xu Yifan	2–6, 1–6
Winner	11.	8 June 2009	Tokyo, Japan	Hard	(Japan) Mari Tanaka	(Japan) Maki Arai (Japan) Yurina Koshino	7–6, 6–0
Winner	12.	2 August 2009	Obihiro, Japan	Carpet	(Japan) Natsumi Hamamura	(Japan) Rika Fujiwara (Japan) Kurumi Nara	3–6, 6–1, [10–5]
Winner	13.	23 May 2010	Karuizawa, Japan	Carpet	(Japan) Akiko Yonemura	(China) Sun Shengnan (China) Xu Yifan	7–6 ^{(7–1)}, 6–3
Runner-up	14.	2 August 2010	Niigata, Japan	Carpet	(Japan) Miki Miyamura	(Japan) Akari Inoue (Japan) Kotomi Takahata	1–6, 4–6
Runner-up	15.	19 September 2010	Kyoto, Japan	Carpet (i)	(Japan) Kaori Onishi	(Japan) Kazusa Ito (Japan) Tomoko Taira	3–6, 6–7^{(5–7)}
Winner	16.	20 March 2011	Miyazaki, Japan	Carpet	(Japan) Mari Inoue	(Japan) Chinami Ogi (Japan) Yuuki Tanaka	5–7, 6–2, [10–8]
Winner	17.	15 May 2011	Kurume Cup, Japan	Grass	(Japan) Akiko Yonemura	(Japan) Rika Fujiwara (Thailand) Tamarine Tanasugarn	6–3, 5–7, [10–8]
Runner-up	18.	22 May 2011	Karuizawa, Japan	Carpet (i)	(Japan) Natsumi Hamamura	(Japan) Rika Fujiwara (Japan) Shuko Aoyama	4–6, 4–6
Runner-up	19.	14 May 2011	Niigata, Japan	Hard	(Japan) Akari Inoue	(Japan) Natsumi Hamamura (Japan) Erika Sema	1–6, 2–6
Runner-up	20.	22 August 2011	Saitama, Japan	Hard	(Japan) Akari Inoue	(China) Liu Wanting (China) Liang Chen	3–6, 7–5, [9–11]
Runner-up	21.	11 September 2011	Nato, Japan	Carpet	(Japan) Natsumi Hamamura	(Japan) Kanae Hisami (Thailand) Varatchaya Wongteanchai	6–1, 6–7^{(4–7)}, [12–14]
Winner	22.	30 October 2011	Hamanako, Japan	Carpet	(Japan) Natsumi Hamamura	(Vietnam) Huỳnh Phương Đài Trang (Thailand) Varatchaya Wongteanchai	6–3, 6–3
Winner	23.	23 March 2012	ITF Kofu, Japan	Hard	(Japan) Kotomi Takahata	(Japan) Eri Hozumi (Japan) Remi Tezuka	6–4, 5–7, [10–3]
