= Aiko Nakamura =

Japanese tennis player (born 1983)

Aiko Nakamura 中村藍子
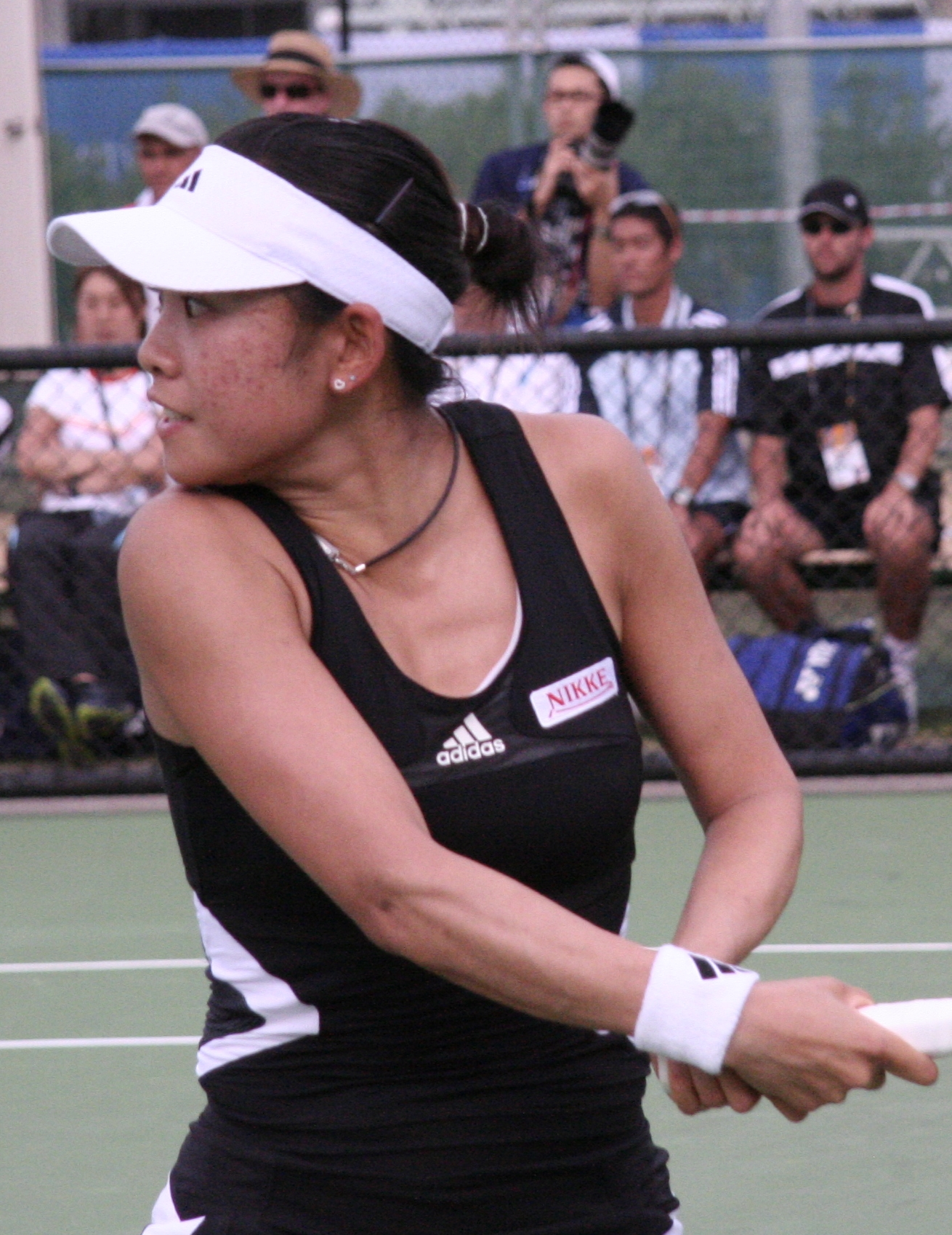
- Country (sports): Japan
- Born: 28 December 1983 (age 41) Osaka
- Height: 1.63 m (5 ft 4 in)
- Turned pro: 1999
- Retired: 2012
- Plays: Right-handed (two-handed both sides)
- Prize money: $861,081

Singles
- Career record: 268–237
- Career titles: 4 ITF
- Highest ranking: No. 47 (6 August 2007)

Grand Slam singles results
- Australian Open: 3R (2006, 2007)
- French Open: 1R (2005–2008)
- Wimbledon: 2R (2005, 2007)
- US Open: 2R (2005, 2006)

Doubles
- Career record: 80–113
- Career titles: 3 ITF
- Highest ranking: No. 64 (3 March 2008)

Grand Slam doubles results
- Australian Open: 2R (2008)
- French Open: 1R (2006–2008)
- Wimbledon: 2R (2005, 2007, 2008)
- US Open: 2R (2007)

Team competitions
- Fed Cup: 6–4

Aiko Nakamura (中村藍子, Nakamura Aiko) (born 28 December 1983), is a Japanese former professional tennis player. In July 2008, she was the second highest WTA-ranked Japanese singles tennis player, at No. 107, after Ai Sugiyama.

Nakamura was born in Tennōji-ku, Osaka. Like her role-model Monica Seles, she had a double-handed forehand and backhand, but served right-handed. She won four singles and three doubles titles on the ITF Circuit. In 2006, she reached the final of the Japan Open in Tokyo, where she lost to Marion Bartoli in three sets.

Nakamura also played for the Japan Fed Cup team. She retired from professional tennis in 2012.

== WTA Tour finals ==
=== Singles: 1 (runner-up) ===
Legend
Grand Slam (0–0)
Tier I (0–0)
Tier II (0–0)
Tier III, IV & V (0–1)

Result	Date	Tournament	Surface	Opponent	Score
Loss	Oct 2006	Tokyo, Japan	Hard	(France) Marion Bartoli	6–2, 2–6, 2–6

=== Doubles: 1 (runner-up) ===
Legend
Grand Slam (0–0)
Tier I (0–0)
Tier II (0–0)
Tier III, IV & V (0–1)

Result	Date	Tournament	Surface	Partner	Opponents	Score
Loss	Sep 2008	Tokyo, Japan	Hard	(Japan) Ayumi Morita	(United States) Jill Craybas (New Zealand) Marina Erakovic	6–4, 5–7, [6–10]

== ITF Circuit finals ==
$100,000 tournaments
$75,000 tournaments
$50,000 tournaments
$25,000 tournaments
$10,000 tournaments

=== Singles: 10 (4–6) ===
Outcome	No.	Date	Tournament	Surface	Opponent	Score
Runner-up	1.	21 April 2002	ITF Gunma, Japan	Carpet	(Russia) Maria Sharapova	4–6, 1–6
Runner-up	2.	21 July 2002	ITF Baltimore, United States	Hard	(United States) Tory Zawacki	4–6, 5–7
Runner-up	3.	20 October 2002	ITF Haibara, Japan	Carpet	(Japan) Shinobu Asagoe	4–6, 5–7
Runner-up	4.	27 October 2002	ITF Tokyo, Japan	Hard	(Japan) Haruka Inoue	2–6, 2–6
Runner-up	5.	23 November 2003	ITF Nuriootpa, Australia	Hard	(United States) Jessica Lehnhoff	6–7^{(2)}, 6–7^{(2)}
Winner	6.	8 August 2004	ITF Louisville, United States	Hard	(Puerto Rico) Vilmarie Castellvi	6–4, 6–2
Winner	7.	24 October 2004	ITF Haibara, Japan	Carpet	(Japan) Yuka Yoshida	6–1, 6–4
Runner-up	8.	7 May 2006	Kangaroo Cup, Japan	Carpet	(Japan) Erika Takao	1–6, 7–5, 1–6
Winner	9.	3 May 2009	Kangaroo Cup, Japan	Carpet	(Japan) Tomoko Yonemura	6–1, 6–4
Winner	10.	29 August 2011	ITF Tsukuba, Japan	Hard	(Chinese Taipei) Chan Chin-wei	6–3, 2–6, 6–3

=== Doubles: 6 (3–3) ===
Outcome	No.	Date	Tournament	Surface	Partner	Opponents	Score
Winner	1.	28 July 2002	ITF Evansville, United States	Hard	(South Korea) Kim Jin-hee	(Australia) Gabrielle Baker (Australia) Deanna Roberts	6–4, 6–0
Runner-up	2.	18 May 2003	ITF Nagano, Japan	Grass	(Japan) Maki Arai	(Japan) Tomoko Taira (Japan) Tomoko Yonemura	3–6, 1–6
Runner-up	3.	25 May 2003	ITF Gunma, Japan	Grass	(Japan) Maki Arai	(Japan) Kumiko Iijima (Thailand) Suchanun Viratprasert	6–4, 5–7, 4–6
Winner	4.	18 April 2004	ITF Ho Chi Minh City, Vietnam	Hard	(Japan) Rika Fujiwara	(Ukraine) Olena Antypina (Russia) Goulnara Fattakhetdinova	6–3, 6–3
Winner	5.	3 May 2009	Kangaroo Cup, Japan	Carpet	(Australia) Sophie Ferguson	(Japan) Misaki Doi (Japan) Kurumi Nara	6–2, 6–1
Runner-up	6.	2 May 2011	Fukuoka International, Japan	Carpet	(Japan) Junri Namigata	(Japan) Shuko Aoyama (Japan) Rika Fujiwara	6–7^{(3)}, 0–6
