= Erika Takao =

Japanese tennis player (born 1987)

- Country (sports): Japan
- Residence: Japan
- Born: 12 October 1987 (age 39) Narashino
- Retired: 2013
- Plays: Right-handed (double-handed backhand)
- Prize money: $147,913

Singles
- Career record: 230–165
- Career titles: 4 ITF
- Highest ranking: No. 128 (6 November 2006)

Grand Slam singles results
- Australian Open: Q1 (2007)
- French Open: Q1 (2007)
- Wimbledon: Q2 (2007)
- US Open: Q1 (2007)

Doubles
- Career record: 55–57
- Career titles: 2 ITF
- Highest ranking: No. 270 (31 October 2011)

Erika Takao (高雄恵利加, Takao Erika; born 12 October 1987) is a retired Japanese tennis player.

On 6 November 2006, she reached her career-high WTA singles ranking of No. 128. On 31 October 2011, she also reached her highest doubles ranking of No. 270.

In 2013, after Japanese national championships, and after ten years playing on the ITF Women's Circuit, Takao announced her retirement.

== ITF Circuit finals ==
$50,000 tournaments
$25,000 tournaments
$10,000 tournaments

=== Singles (4–11) ===
Result	No.	Date	Tournament	Surface	Opponent	Score
Loss	1.	31 October 2004	Tokyo, Japan	Hard	(Japan) Yurika Sema	6–3, 6–7^{(4–7)}, 0–6
Loss	2.	24 April 2005	Yamaguchi, Japan	Clay	(Australia) Lauren Breadmore	3–6, 2–6
Loss	3.	24 July 2005	Kurume, Japan	Grass	(Chinese Taipei) Hsieh Su-wei	2–6, 3–6
Loss	4.	25 September 2005	Ibaraki, Japan	Hard	(Czech Republic) Petra Cetkovská	6–2, 5–7, 3–6
Win	1.	7 May 2006	Gifu, Japan	Carpet	(Japan) Aiko Nakamura	6–1, 5–7, 6–1
Win	2.	9 July 2006	Nagoya, Japan	Hard	(Japan) Shiho Hisamatsu	4–6, 6–2, 6–0
Win	3.	16 July 2006	Miyazaki, Japan	Carpet	(Japan) Tomoko Yonemura	7–5, 6–3
Loss	5.	6 August 2006	Tokachi, Japan	Carpet	(Japan) Ayumi Morita	3–6, 6–4, 6–7^{(6–8)}
Loss	6.	22 October 2006	Makinohara, Japan	Carpet	(Chinese Taipei) Chuang Chia-jung	0–6, 4–6
Loss	7.	15 April 2007	Ho Chi Minh City, Vietnam	Hard	(Japan) Seiko Okamoto	1–6, 2–6
Loss	8.	22 July 2007	Kurume, Japan	Grass	(Japan) Ayumi Morita	1–6, 1–3 ret.
Win	4.	25 May 2008	Nagano, Japan	Carpet	(South Korea) Lee Jin-a	6–4, 6–1
Loss	9.	14 June 2009	Tokyo, Japan	Hard	(Japan) Erika Sema	4–6, 0–6
Loss	10.	13 June 2010	Tokyo, Japan	Hard	(Japan) Shuko Aoyama	6–7^{(3–7)}, 3–6
Loss	11.	15 January 2012	Pingguo, China	Hard	(China) Zhao Yijing	2–6, 4–6

=== Doubles (2–4) ===
Outcome	No.	Date	Tournament	Surface	Partner	Opponents	Score
Winner	1.	4 February 2011	Burnie, Australia	Hard	(Japan) Natsumi Hamamura	(Australia) Olivia Rogowska (Australia) Sally Peers	6–2, 3–6, [10–7]
Runner-up	1.	28 May 2011	Changwon, Korea	Hard	(Japan) Yurika Sema	(Chinese Taipei) Chan Hao-ching (China) Zheng Saisai	2–6, 6–4, [9–11]
Runner-up	2.	3 September 2011	Tsukuba, Japan	Hard	(South Korea) Kim So-jung	(Chinese Taipei) Chan Chin-wei (Chinese Taipei) Hsu Wen-hsin	1–6, 1–6
Runner-up	3.	10 August 2012	Bursa, Turkey	Clay	(Japan) Remi Tezuka	(Austria) Melanie Klaffner (Romania) Laura Ioana Andrei	2–6, 2–6
Winner	2.	18 August 2012	Istanbul, Turkey	Hard	(Japan) Remi Tezuka	(Thailand) Nicha Lertpitaksinchai (Thailand) Peangtarn Plipuech	2–6, 7–6, [10–3]
Runner-up	4.	25 May 2013	Karuizawa, Japan	Grass	(Japan) Miki Miyamura	(Japan) Shiho Akita (Japan) Sachie Ishizu	5–7, 6–7^{(8–10)}
