= Remi Tezuka =

Japanese tennis player (born 1980)

- Country (sports): Japan
- Born: 9 June 1980 (age 44); Tokyo, Japan
- Plays: Right-handed
- Prize money: $142,605

Singles
- Career titles: 0
- Highest ranking: No. 292 (20 September 2010)

Doubles
- Career record: 246–211
- Career titles: 15 ITF
- Highest ranking: No. 186 (29 September 2003)

Remi Tezuka (手塚 玲美, Tezuka Remi, born 9 June 1980) is a former tennis player from Japan.

Born in Tokyo, Tezuka spent most of her career competing on the ITF Women's Circuit, where she was successful in doubles, with a total of 15 titles.

Tezuka, a right-handed player, made the occasional main draw appearance in doubles on the WTA Tour, including a quarterfinal appearance at the Japan Open in 2004.

She retired from professional tennis after the 2012 season.

== ITF Circuit finals ==
$50,000 tournaments
$25,000 tournaments
$10,000 tournaments

=== Singles (0–3) ===
Result	No.	Date	Tournament	Surface	Opponent	Score
Loss	1.	2 July 2000	ITF Lachine, Canada	Clay	(Republic of Ireland) Kelly Liggan	5–7, 0–6
Loss	2.	3 September 2006	ITF Saitama, Japan	Hard	(Japan) Mayumi Yamamoto	5–7, 7–6, 6–7
Loss	3.	9 August 2009	ITF Niigata, Japan	Carpet	(Japan) Shiho Akita	4–6, 4–6

=== Doubles (15–19) ===
Result	No.	Date	Tournament	Surface	Partner	Opponents	Score
Win	1.	15 August 1999	ITF Bucharest, Romania	Clay	(Japan) Satomi Kinjo	(Federal Republic of Yugoslavia) Marina Petković (Italy) Veronica Sartini	4–6, 7–5, 7–6
Loss	1.	28 November 1999	ITF Kōfu, Japan	Carpet	(Japan) Maki Arai	(Japan) Seiko Okamoto (Japan) Keiko Taguchi	6–7, 6–0, 5–7
Win	2.	23 July 2000	ITF Vancouver, Canada	Hard	(Japan) Satomi Kinjo	(Canada) Nicole Havlicek (Australia) Michelle Summerside	2–6, 7–6, 6–4
Loss	2.	25 September 2000	GB Pro-Series Glasgow, UK	Hard (i)	(United Kingdom) Julia Smith	(United Kingdom) Anna Hawkins (United Kingdom) Abigail Tordoff	2–6, 2–6
Loss	3.	10 March 2001	ITF Hangzhou, China	Hard	(Slovakia) Lenka Dlhopolcová	(China) Li Na (China) Shen Luili	3–6, 3–6
Loss	4.	2 July 2001	ITF Amsterdam, Netherlands	Clay	(Indonesia) Romana Tedjakusuma	(South Africa) Mareze Joubert (Netherlands) Andrea van den Hurk	2–6, 2–6
Win	3.	10 February 2002	ITF Faro, Portugal	Hard	(Japan) Maki Arai	(Japan) Satomi Kinjo (Japan) Seiko Okamoto	7–5, 6–7^{(5)}, 6–2
Win	4.	17 February 2002	ITF Vilamoura, Portugal	Hard	(Japan) Maki Arai	(Romania) Liana Ungur (Spain) Marta Fraga	6–2, 7–5
Loss	5.	14 April 2002	ITF Ho Chi Minh City, Vietnam	Hard	(Japan) Ayami Takase	(China) Yan Zi (China) Zheng Jie	1–6, 6–1, 2–6
Loss	6.	23 June 2002	ITF Montreal, Canada	Hard	(Japan) Kaori Aoyama	(Canada) Mélanie Marois (United States) Michelle Faucher	3–6, 6–3, 1–6
Win	5.	20 October 2002	ITF Haibara, Japan	Carpet	(Japan) Yuka Yoshida	(Japan) Haruka Inoue (Japan) Maiko Inoue	6–0, 6–2
Win	6.	1 December 2002	ITF Nonthaburi, Thailand	Hard	(Croatia) Ivana Abramović	(United States) Amanda Augustus (Netherlands) Debby Haak	6–2, 6–1
Win	7.	1 June 2003	ITF Houston, United States	Hard (i)	(Japan) Seiko Okamoto	(Republic of Ireland) Yvonne Doyle (South Africa) Nicole Rencken	5–7, 6–4, 6–3
Loss	7.	30 May 2004	ITF Seoul, South Korea	Hard	(Japan) Shiho Hisamatsu	(South Korea) Choi Jin-young (South Korea) Kim Mi-ok	6–4, 1–6, 1–6
Loss	8.	3 July 2004	ITF Inchon, South Korea	Hard	(Japan) Maki Arai	(South Korea) Lee Jin-a (South Korea) Yoo Soo-mi	2–6, 6–4, 4–6
Win	8.	7 September 2004	ITF Ibaraki, Japan	Hard	(Japan) Maki Arai	(Japan) Rika Fujiwara (Japan) Shiho Hisamatsu	6–1, 5–7, 6–2
Win	9.	29 May 2005	ITF Shanghai, China	Hard	(Chinese Taipei) Chuang Chia-jung	(China) Liu Wanting (China) Sun Shengnan	4–6, 6–4, 6–1
Loss	9.	28 May 2006	ITF Nagano, Japan	Carpet	(Japan) Tomoko Yonemura	(Japan) Kumiko Iijima (Japan) Junri Namigata	3–6, 6–7^{(3)}
Loss	10.	6 August 2006	ITF Tokachi, Japan	Carpet	(Japan) Shiho Hisamatsu	(Japan) Kumiko Iijima (Japan) Junri Namigata	5–7, 4–6
Loss	11.	10 March 2008	ITF Kalgoorlie, Australia	Hard	(Japan) Natsumi Hamamura	(China) Li Ting (China) Zhou Yimiao	1–6, 6–4, [8–10]
Loss	12.	31 March 2008	ITF Pelham, United States	Clay	(South Korea) Lee Ye-ra	(Czech Republic) Michaela Paštiková (United States) Ahsha Rolle	5–7, 2–6
Win	10.	23 June 2008	ITF Qianshan, China	Hard	(Japan) Natsumi Hamamura	(Japan) Yuka Kuroda (Japan) Tomoko Sugano	6–4, 6–0
Win	11.	12 September 2008	ITF Rockhampton, Australia	Hard	(China) Zhou Yimiao	(Sweden) Michaela Johansson (Australia) Jarmila Gajdošová	7–6^{(2)}, 6–4
Loss	13.	19 July 2010	ITF Nonthaburi, Thailand	Hard	(South Korea) Kim So-jung	(Japan) Akiko Yonemura (Japan) Tomoko Yonemura	2–6, 4–6
Loss	14.	26 October 2010	ITF Port Pirie, Australia	Clay	(United Kingdom) Melanie South	(Australia) Bojana Bobusic (Australia) Alenka Hubacek	3–6, 2–6
Loss	15.	12 November 2010	ITF Esperance, Australia	Hard	(Japan) Chiaki Okadaue	(Australia) Jessica Moore (Australia) Daniella Jeflea	6–7^{(5)}, 3–6
Loss	16.	6 February 2011	ITF Rancho Santa Fe, United States	Hard	(Japan) Shuko Aoyama	(United States) Julie Ditty (Bosnia and Herzegovina) Mervana Jugić-Salkić	0–6, 2–6
Win	12.	20 February 2011	ITF Surprise, United States	Hard	(Japan) Shuko Aoyama	(Bosnia and Herzegovina) Mervana Jugić-Salkić (United States) Tetiana Luzhanska	6–3, 6–1
Win	13.	4 June 2011	ITF Gimcheon, South Korea	Hard	(Chinese Taipei) Chan Hao-ching	(South Korea) Kim Ji-young (South Korea) Yoo Mi	7–5, 6–4
Loss	17.	8 October 2011	Kōfu International Open, Japan	Hard	(Japan) Akiko Yonemura	(Chinese Taipei) Chan Chin-wei (Chinese Taipei) Hsu Wen-hsin	3–6, 4–6
Loss	18.	25 March 2012	ITF Kofu, Japan	Hard	(Japan) Eri Hozumi	(Japan) Ayumi Oka (Japan) Kotomi Takahata	4–6, 7–5, [3–10]
Win	14.	1 April 2012	ITF Nishitama, Japan	Hard	(Japan) Eri Hozumi	(Japan) Kazusa Ito (Japan) Yuka Mori	6–4, 6–7, [10–7]
Loss	19.	10 August 2012	Bursa Cup, Turkey	Clay	(Japan) Erika Takao	(Austria) Melanie Klaffner (Romania) Laura Ioana Paar	2–6, 2–6
Win	15.	18 August 2012	ITF İstanbul, Turkey	Hard	(Japan) Erika Takao	(Thailand) Nicha Lertpitaksinchai (Thailand) Peangtarn Plipuech	2–6, 7–6, [10–3]
