= 2004 Fed Cup Asia/Oceania Zone Group I – play-offs =

International tennis competition play-offs

The play-offs of the 2004 Fed Cup Asia/Oceania Zone Group I were the final stages of the Group I Zonal Competition involving teams from Asia and Oceania. Using the positions determined in their pools, the nine teams faced off to determine their placing in the 2004 Fed Cup Asia/Oceania Zone Group I, the top two countries of each pool played for first to fourth placings, while the bottom two of each pool competed for sixth to ninth. The teams that ended up placing first overall advanced to World Group play-offs, whilst those coming in eighth were relegated down to Group II for the next year.

Placing	Pool A	Pool B
1	Thailand	Indonesia
2	New Zealand	India
3		South Korea
4	China	Chinese Taipei
5	Philippines	Uzbekistan

== Promotion play-offs ==
The first and second placed teams of each pool were placed against each other in two head-to-head rounds. The winner of the rounds advanced to the World Group play-offs, where they would get a chance to advance to the World Group for next year.

=== Thailand vs. India ===
Thailand
2
R.K. Khanna Tennis Complex, New Delhi, India
24 April 2004
Decoturf II (outdoors)

India
0

			1	2	3
1	(Thailand) (India)	Suchanun Viratprasert; Sania Mirza	7^{7} 6^{3}	6; 1
2	(Thailand) (India)	Tamarine Tanasugarn; Rushmi Chakravarthi	6; 0	6; 1
3	(Thailand) (India)	Montinee Tangphong / Napaporn Tongsalee; Manisha Malhotra / Sania Mirza				not played

=== New Zealand vs. Indonesia ===
New Zealand
1
R.K. Khanna Tennis Complex, New Delhi, India
24 April 2004
Decoturf II (outdoors)

Indonesia
2

			1	2	3
1	(New Zealand) (Indonesia)	Marina Erakovic; Wynne Prakusya	6; 2	6; 1
2	(New Zealand) (Indonesia)	Shelley Stephens; Angelique Widjaja	0; 6	3; 6
3	(New Zealand) (Indonesia)	Eden Marama / Paula Marama; Wynne Prakusya / Angelique Widjaja	6; 4	6^{5} 7^{7}	1; 6

== Fifth ==
As there was only four teams from Pool A as opposed to the five from Pool B, the third-placed team from Pool B (South Korea) had no equivalent to play against. Thus the South Koreans were automatically allocated fifth place.

== Relegation play-offs ==
The last and second-to-last placed teams of each pool were placed against each other in two head-to-head rounds. The losing team of the rounds were relegated to Group II for next year.

=== China vs. Uzbekistan ===
China
2
R.K. Khanna Tennis Complex, New Delhi, India
24 April 2004
Decoturf II (outdoors)

Uzbekistan
1

			1	2	3
1	(China) (Uzbekistan)	Yang Shujing; Vlada Ekshibarova	3; 6	6; 3	6; 0
2	(China) (Uzbekistan)	Hao Jie; Ivanna Israilova	0; 6	3; 6
3	(China) (Uzbekistan)	Yang Shujing / Yu Ying; Akgul Amanmuradova / Ivanna Israilova	7; 5	6; 3

=== Philippines vs. Chinese Taipei ===
Philippines
1
R.K. Khanna Tennis Complex, New Delhi, India
24 April 2004
Decoturf II (outdoors)

Chinese Taipei
2

			1	2	3
1	(Philippines) (Chinese Taipei)	Anna-Patricia Santos; Hwang I-hsuan	3; 6	3; 6
2	(Philippines) (Chinese Taipei)	Czarina-Mae Arévalo; Wang I-ting	6; 3	7^{7} 6^{4}
3	(Philippines) (Chinese Taipei)	Czarina-Mae Arévalo / Anna-Patricia Santos; Hwang I-hsuan / Wang I-ting	6; 2	6^{1} 7^{7}	10; 12

== Final Placements ==
Placing	Teams
Promoted	Thailand
Promoted	Indonesia
Third	India
Third	New Zealand
Fifth	South Korea
Sixth	China
Sixth	Chinese Taipei
Relegated	Uzbekistan
Relegated	Philippines

- Thailand and Indonesia advanced to the World Group play-offs. The Thai were drawn against Australia, and they won 3–2. The Indonesians were drawn against Slovenia, and they also were victorious 4–1. Both teams thus competed in the 2005 World Group.
- Uzbekistan and Philippines were relegated down to Asia/Oceania Zone Group II for the next year, where they respectively placed second and first overall. Thus, they both achieved advancement back to Group I for 2006.

== See also ==
- Fed Cup structure
