= 2004 Fed Cup Asia/Oceania Zone Group I – Pool B =

Group B of the 2004 Fed Cup Asia/Oceania Zone Group I was one of two pools in the Asia/Oceania Zone Group I of the 2004 Fed Cup. Four teams competed in a round robin competition, with the top two teams and the bottom two teams proceeding to their respective sections of the play-offs: the top teams play for advancement to the World Group play-offs, while the bottom teams face potential relegation to Group II.

		(Indonesia) INA	(Chinese Taipei) TPE	(South Korea) KOR	(Uzbekistan) UZB	(India) IND	RR; W–L	Set; W–L	Game; W–L	Standings
18	Indonesia		3–0	2–1	2–1	2–1	4–0	19–8	144–113	1
26	Chinese Taipei	0–3		0–3	2–1	0–3	1–3	6–21	99–149	4
33	South Korea	1–2	3–0		2–1	1–2	2–2	17–10	142–117	3
37	Uzbekistan	1–2	1–2	1–2		1–2	0–4	9–19	121–153	5
43	India	1–2	3–0	2–1	2–1		3–1	16–9	137–111	2

== Indonesia vs. Uzbekistan ==
Indonesia
2
R.K. Khanna Tennis Complex, New Delhi, India
19 April 2004
Decoturf II (outdoors)

Uzbekistan
1

			1	2	3
1	(Indonesia) (Uzbekistan)	Sandy Gumulya; Ivanna Israilova	3; 6	6; 4	1; 6
2	(Indonesia) (Uzbekistan)	Wynne Prakusya; Akgul Amanmuradova	7; 5	6; 0
3	(Indonesia) (Uzbekistan)	Wynne Prakusya / Angelique Widjaja; Akgul Amanmuradova / Ivanna Israilova	6; 3	7^{7} 6^{5}

== Chinese Taipei vs. India ==
Chinese Taipei
0
R.K. Khanna Tennis Complex, New Delhi, India
19 April 2004
Decoturf II (outdoors)

India
3

			1	2	3
1	(Chinese Taipei) (India)	Wang I-ting; Ankita Bhambri	3; 6	1; 6
2	(Chinese Taipei) (India)	Chuang Chia-jung; Sania Mirza	4; 6	6^{3} 7^{7}
3	(Chinese Taipei) (India)	Hwang I-hsuan / Wang Ting-wen; Manisha Malhotra / Sania Mirza	5; 7	1; 6

== Chinese Taipei vs. Uzbekistan ==
Chinese Taipei
2
R.K. Khanna Tennis Complex, New Delhi, India
20 April 2004
Decoturf II (outdoors)

Uzbekistan
1

			1	2	3
1	(Chinese Taipei) (Uzbekistan)	Hwang I-hsuan; Ivanna Israilova	6; 4	3; 6	5; 7
2	(Chinese Taipei) (Uzbekistan)	Chuang Chia-jung; Akgul Amanmuradova	5; 7	6; 2	10; 8
3	(Chinese Taipei) (Uzbekistan)	Chuang Chia-jung / Wang I-ting; Elina Arutyunova / Ivanna Israilova	6; 0	6; 2

== South Korea vs. India ==
South Korea
1
R.K. Khanna Tennis Complex, New Delhi, India
20 April 2004
Decoturf II (outdoors)

India
2

			1	2	3
1	(South Korea) (India)	Chang Kyung-mi; Ankita Bhambri	1; 6	6; 4	2; 6
2	(South Korea) (India)	Jeon Mi-ra; Sania Mirza	6; 4	6; 2
3	(South Korea) (India)	Cho Yoon-jeong / Jeon Mi-ra; Manisha Malhotra / Sania Mirza	6^{2} 7^{7}	5; 7

== Indonesia vs. Chinese Taipei ==
Indonesia
3
R.K. Khanna Tennis Complex, New Delhi, India
21 April 2004
Decoturf II (outdoors)

Chinese Taipei
0

			1	2	3
1	(Indonesia) (Chinese Taipei)	Sandy Gumulya; Hwang I-hsuan	2; 6	6; 3	6; 2
2	(Indonesia) (Chinese Taipei)	Wynne Prakusya; Chuang Chia-jung	6; 1	6; 1
3	(Indonesia) (Chinese Taipei)	Wynne Prakusya / Angelique Widjaja; Wang I-ting / Wang Ting-wen	6; 4	6; 0

== South Korea vs. Uzbekistan ==
South Korea
2
R.K. Khanna Tennis Complex, New Delhi, India
21 April 2004
Decoturf II (outdoors)

Uzbekistan
1

			1	2	3
1	(South Korea) (Uzbekistan)	Kim Jin-hee; Vlada Ekshibarova	6; 2	6; 4
2	(South Korea) (Uzbekistan)	Jeon Mi-ra; Ivanna Israilova	3; 6	6; 4	4; 6
3	(South Korea) (Uzbekistan)	Chang Kyung-mi / Cho Yoon-jeong; Akgul Amanmuradova / Ivanna Israilova	6; 4	6; 4

== Indonesia vs. India ==
Indonesia
2
R.K. Khanna Tennis Complex, New Delhi, India
22 April 2004
Decoturf II (outdoors)

India
1

			1	2	3
1	(Indonesia) (India)	Sandy Gumulya; Ankita Bhambri	4; 6	4; 6
2	(Indonesia) (India)	Wynne Prakusya; Sania Mirza	7; 5	6; 4
3	(Indonesia) (India)	Wynne Prakusya / Angelique Widjaja; Manisha Malhotra / Sania Mirza	7^{7} 6^{2}	6; 3

== Chinese Taipei vs. South Korea ==
Chinese Taipei
0
R.K. Khanna Tennis Complex, New Delhi, India
22 April 2004
Decoturf II (outdoors)

South Korea
3

			1	2	3
1	(Chinese Taipei) (South Korea)	Hwang I-hsuan; Kim Jin-hee	2; 6	0; 6
2	(Chinese Taipei) (South Korea)	Wang I-ting; Jeon Mi-ra	2; 6	2; 6
3	(Chinese Taipei) (South Korea)	Hwang I-hsuan / Wang I-ting; Chang Kyung-mi / Cho Yoon-jeong	3; 6	6^{2} 7^{7}

== Indonesia vs. South Korea ==
Indonesia
2
R.K. Khanna Tennis Complex, New Delhi, India
23 April 2004
Decoturf II (outdoors)

South Korea
1

			1	2	3
1	(Indonesia) (South Korea)	Sandy Gumulya; Kim Jin-hee	3; 6	1; 6
2	(Indonesia) (South Korea)	Wynne Prakusya; Jeon Mi-ra	7; 5	6^{2} 7^{7}	6; 4
3	(Indonesia) (South Korea)	Wynne Prakusya / Angelique Widjaja; Chang Kyung-mi / Cho Yoon-jeong	6; 3	7; 5

== Uzbekistan vs. India ==
Uzbekistan
1
R.K. Khanna Tennis Complex, New Delhi, India
23 April 2004
Decoturf II (outdoors)

India
2

			1	2	3
1	(Uzbekistan) (India)	Ivanna Israilova; Ankita Bhambri	6; 4	6; 4
2	(Uzbekistan) (India)	Akgul Amanmuradova; Sania Mirza	4; 6	2; 6
3	(Uzbekistan) (India)	Vlada Ekshibarova / Ivanna Israilova; Manisha Malhotra / Sania Mirza	6^{19} 7^{21}	1; 6

== See also ==
- Fed Cup structure
