= Ivanna Israilova =

Uzbek-born Russian tennis player

- Country (sports): Uzbekistan (2001–2006); Russia (2006–2012)
- Born: 4 February 1986 (age 39) Tashkent, Uzbek SSR, Soviet Union
- Turned pro: 2001
- Retired: 2012
- Plays: Right-handed (two-handed backhand)
- Prize money: $26,971

Singles
- Career record: 69–64
- Career titles: 0
- Highest ranking: No. 417 (7 June 2004)

Doubles
- Career record: 51–49
- Career titles: 0 WTA, 2 ITF
- Highest ranking: No. 313 (9 February 2004)

Team competitions
- Fed Cup: 12–14

Ivanna Israilova (Russian: Иванна Исраилова; born 4 February 1986) is an Uzbekistani-born Russian retired tennis player.

In her career, Israilova won two doubles titles on the ITF Women's Circuit. On 7 June 2004, she reached her best singles ranking of world number 417. On 9 February 2004, she peaked at number 313 in the WTA doubles rankings. Playing for Uzbekistan at the Fed Cup, she has a win–loss record of 12–14. Israilova retirement from tennis 2012.

== ITF Circuit finals ==
$50,000 tournaments
$25,000 tournaments
$10,000 tournaments

=== Singles (0–3) ===
Outcome	Date	Category	Location	Surface	Opponent	Score
Runner-up	8 June 2003	10,000	Seoul, South Korea	Hard	(Chinese Taipei) Chuang Chia-jung	2–6, 2–6
Runner-up	24 January 2005	10,000	Hull, Great Britain	Hard (i)	(United Kingdom) Katie O'Brien	4–6, 4–6
Runner-up	26 June 2006	10,000	Amarante, Portugal	Hard	(Russia) Natalia Orlova	4–6, ret.

=== Doubles (2-2) ===
Outcome	Date	Category	Location	Surface	Partner	Opponents	Score
Winner	9 February 2003	10,000	Chennai, India	Hard	(Uzbekistan) Akgul Amanmuradova	(India) Rushmi Chakravarthi (India) Sai Jayalakshmy Jayaram	6–4, 6–1
Runner-up	10 August 2003	10,000	Vigo, Spain	Hard	(Russia) Raissa Gourevitch	(Spain) Marta Fraga (Spain) María Pilar Sánchez Alayeto	w/o
Runner-up	31 July 2005	10,000	Horb, Germany	Clay	(Russia) Elena Chalova	(Czech Republic) Lucie Kriegsmannová (Czech Republic) Zuzana Zálabská	4–6, 3–6
Winner	2 August 2005	10,000	Bad Saulgau, Germany	Clay	(Russia) Elena Chalova	(Bosnia and Herzegovina) Sandra Martinović (Croatia) Darija Jurak	6–4, 4–6, 6–4

== Fed Cup participation ==
=== Singles ===
Edition	Date	Location	Against	Surface	Opponent	W/L	Score
2002 Fed Cup; Asia/Oceania Zone I	4 March 2002	Guangzhou, China	(Hong Kong) Hong Kong	Hard	(Hong Kong) Tong Ka-po	L	1–6, 3–6
2002 Fed Cup; Asia/Oceania Zone I	5 March 2002	Guangzhou, China	Philippines	Hard	(Philippines) Czarina Arevalo	W	7–5, 6–2
2002 Fed Cup; Asia/Oceania Zone I	6 March 2002	Guangzhou, China	Japan	Hard	(Japan) Saori Obata	L	1–6, 1–6
2002 Fed Cup; Asia/Oceania Zone I	7 March 2002	Guangzhou, China	China	Hard	(China) Li Na	L	1–6, 4–6
2002 Fed Cup; Asia/Oceania Zone I	8 March 2002	Guangzhou, China	Thailand	Hard	(Thailand) Napaporn Tongsalee	L	1–6, 7–6^{(1)}, 4–6
2003 Fed Cup; Asia/Oceania Zone I	21 April 2003	Tokyo, Japan	(Thailand) Thailand	Hard	(Thailand) Suchanun Viratprasert	W	6–2, 6–7^{(6)}, 6–2
2003 Fed Cup; Asia/Oceania Zone I	23 April 2003	Tokyo, Japan	Malaysia	Hard	(Malaysia) Liaw Chen-Yee	W	6–0, 6–4
2003 Fed Cup; Asia/Oceania Zone I	24 April 2003	Tokyo, Japan	Indonesia	Hard	(Indonesia) Wynne Prakusya	L	6–4, 1–6, 3–6
2003 Fed Cup; Asia/Oceania Zone I	25 April 2003	Tokyo, Japan	Kazakhstan	Hard	(Kazakhstan) Marina Spakova	W	6–3, 6–7^{(5)}, 6–3
2004 Fed Cup; Asia/Oceania Zone I	19 April 2004	New Delhi, India	(Indonesia) Indonesia	Hard	(Indonesia) Sandy Gumulya	W	6–3, 4–6, 6–1
2004 Fed Cup; Asia/Oceania Zone I	20 April 2004	New Delhi, India	Chinese Taipei	Hard	(Chinese Taipei) Hwang I-hsuan	W	4–6, 6–3, 7–5
2004 Fed Cup; Asia/Oceania Zone I	21 April 2004	New Delhi, India	South Korea	Hard	(South Korea) Jeon Mi-ra	W	6–3, 4–6, 6–4
2004 Fed Cup; Asia/Oceania Zone I	23 April 2004	New Delhi, India	India	Hard	(India) Ankita Bhambri	W	6–4, 6–4
2004 Fed Cup; Asia/Oceania Zone I	24 April 2004	New Delhi, India	(China) China	Hard	(China) Hao Jie	W	6–0, 6–3
2005 Fed Cup; Asia/Oceania Zone II	19 April 2005	New Delhi, India	(Philippines) Philippines	Hard	(Philippines) Anja-Vanessa Peter	W	4–6, 6–2, 7–5

=== Doubles ===
Edition	Date	Location	Against	Surface	Partner	Opponents	W/L	Score
2002 Fed Cup; Asia/Oceania Zone I	4 March 2002	Guangzhou, China	(Hong Kong) Hong Kong	Hard	(Uzbekistan) Akgul Amanmuradova	(Hong Kong) Lin Su-Chen (Hong Kong) Tong Ka-po	W	6–2, 4–6, 6–3
2002 Fed Cup; Asia/Oceania Zone I	7 March 2002	Guangzhou, China	China	Hard	(Uzbekistan) Akgul Amanmuradova	(China) Li Ting (China) Zheng Jie	L	2–6, 2–6
2002 Fed Cup; Asia/Oceania Zone I	8 March 2002	Guangzhou, China	Thailand	Hard	(Uzbekistan) Akgul Amanmuradova	(Thailand) Pichaya Laosirichon (Thailand) Napaporn Tongsalee	L	2–6, 4–6
2003 Fed Cup; Asia/Oceania Zone I	21 April 2003	Tokyo, Japan	(Thailand) Thailand	Hard	(Uzbekistan) Iroda Tulyaganova	(Thailand) Napaporn Tongsalee (Thailand) Tamarine Tanasugarn	L	2–6, 1–6
2003 Fed Cup; Asia/Oceania Zone I	23 April 2003	Tokyo, Japan	Malaysia	Hard	(Uzbekistan) Akgul Amanmuradova	(Malaysia) Liaw Chen-Yee (Malaysia) Norzafira Taufik	W	6–0, 6–2
2003 Fed Cup; Asia/Oceania Zone I	24 April 2003	Tokyo, Japan	Indonesia	Hard	(Uzbekistan) Akgul Amanmuradova	(Indonesia) Wynne Prakusya (Indonesia) Angelique Widjaja	L	2–6, 1–6
2004 Fed Cup; Asia/Oceania Zone I	19 April 2004	New Delhi, India	(Indonesia) Indonesia	Hard	(Uzbekistan) Akgul Amanmuradova	(Indonesia) Wynne Prakusya (Indonesia) Angelique Widjaja	L	3–6, 6–7^{(5–7)}
2004 Fed Cup; Asia/Oceania Zone I	20 April 2004	New Delhi, India	Chinese Taipei	Hard	(Uzbekistan) Elina Arutyunova	(Chinese Taipei) Chuang Chia-jung (Chinese Taipei) Wang I-ting	L	0–6, 2–6
2004 Fed Cup; Asia/Oceania Zone I	21 April 2004	New Delhi, India	South Korea	Hard	(Uzbekistan) Akgul Amanmuradova	(South Korea) Chang Kyung-mi (South Korea) Cho Yoon-jeong	L	4–6, 4–6
2004 Fed Cup; Asia/Oceania Zone I	23 April 2004	New Delhi, India	India	Hard	(Uzbekistan) Vlada Ekshibarova	(India) Manisha Malhotra (India) Sania Mirza	L	6–7^{(19–21)}, 1–6
2004 Fed Cup; Asia/Oceania Zone I	24 April 2004	New Delhi, India	(China) China	Hard	(Uzbekistan) Akgul Amanmuradova	(China) Yang Shujing (China) Yu Ying	L	5–7, 3–6
