= 2004 Fed Cup Asia/Oceania Zone Group I – Pool A =

Group A of the 2004 Fed Cup Asia/Oceania Zone Group I was one of two pools in the Asia/Oceania Zone Group I of the 2004 Fed Cup. Four teams competed in a round robin competition, with the top two teams and the bottom two teams proceeding to their respective sections of the play-offs: the top teams play for advancement to the World Group play-offs, while the bottom teams face potential relegation to Group II.

		(China) CHN	(Thailand) THA	(New Zealand) NZL	(Philippines) PHI	RR; W–L	Set; W–L	Game; W–L	Standings
20	China		1–2	1–2	3–0	1–2	11–7	86–72	3
29	Thailand	2–1		2–1	3–0	3–0	13–6	137–94	1
52	New Zealand	2–1	1–2		3–0	2–1	13–8	79–57	2
55	Philippines	0–3	0–3	0–3		0–3	2–18	37–116	4

== China vs. Thailand ==
China
1
R.K. Khanna Tennis Complex, New Delhi, India
20 April 2004
Decoturf II (outdoors)

Thailand
2

			1	2	3
1	(China) (Thailand)	Yang Shujing; Suchanun Viratprasert	4; 6	6; 3	2; 3	retired
2	(China) (Thailand)	Liu Wei-juan; Tamarine Tanasugarn	2; 6	0; 6
3	(China) (Thailand)	Hao Jie / Yu Ying; Montinee Tangphong / Napaporn Tongsalee	6; 1	6; 2

== New Zealand vs. Philippines ==
New Zealand
3
R.K. Khanna Tennis Complex, New Delhi, India
20 April 2004
Decoturf II (outdoors)

Philippines
0

			1	2	3
1	(New Zealand) (Philippines)	Shelley Stephens; Anna-Patricia Santos	6; 1	6; 0
2	(New Zealand) (Philippines)	Eden Marama; Czarina-Mae Arévalo	3; 6	7; 5	6; 0
3	(New Zealand) (Philippines)	Marina Erakovic / Paula Marama; Czarina-Mae Arévalo / Anna-Patricia Santos	3; 6	6; 0	6; 1

== China vs. New Zealand ==
China
1
R.K. Khanna Tennis Complex, New Delhi, India
21 April 2004
Decoturf II (outdoors)

New Zealand
2

			1	2	3
1	(China) (New Zealand)	Liu Wei-juan; Marina Erakovic	4; 6	1; 6
2	(China) (New Zealand)	Hao Jie; Shelley Stephens	7^{8} 6^{6}	7^{7} 6^{3}
3	(China) (New Zealand)	Yang Shujing / Yu Ying; Eden Marama / Paula Marama	4; 6	0; 6

== Thailand vs. Philippines ==
Thailand
3
R.K. Khanna Tennis Complex, New Delhi, India
21 April 2004
Decoturf II (outdoors)

Philippines
0

			1	2	3
1	(Thailand) (Philippines)	Napaporn Tongsalee; Anna-Patricia Santos	6; 1	6; 1
2	(Thailand) (Philippines)	Tamarine Tanasugarn; Czarina-Mae Arévalo	6; 2	6; 1
3	(Thailand) (Philippines)	Montinee Tangphong / Suchanun Viratprasert; Czarina-Mae Arévalo / Anna-Patricia Santos	6; 0	6; 4

== China vs. Philippines ==
China
3
R.K. Khanna Tennis Complex, New Delhi, India
22 April 2004
Decoturf II (outdoors)

Philippines
0

			1	2	3
1	(China) (Philippines)	Yang Shujing; Alyssa-Ann Labay	6; 0	6; 0
2	(China) (Philippines)	Hao Jie; Czarina-Mae Arévalo	6; 1	7; 5
3	(China) (Philippines)	Yang Shujing / Yu Ying; Czarina-Mae Arévalo / Anna-Patricia Santos	6; 2	6; 1

== Thailand vs. New Zealand ==
Thailand
2
R.K. Khanna Tennis Complex, New Delhi, India
22 April 2004
Decoturf II (outdoors)

New Zealand
1

			1	2	3
1	(Thailand) (New Zealand)	Suchanun Viratprasert; Marina Erakovic	7; 5	3; 6	9; 7
2	(Thailand) (New Zealand)	Tamarine Tanasugarn; Eden Marama	6; 3	6; 3
3	(Thailand) (New Zealand)	Montinee Tangphong / Napaporn Tongsalee; Paula Marama / Shelley Stephens	4; 6	3; 6

== See also ==
- Fed Cup structure
