= 2004 Fed Cup Asia/Oceania Zone =

Subsection of tennis competition

The Asia/Oceania Zone was one of three zones of regional competition in the 2004 Fed Cup.

== Group I ==
- Venue: R.K. Khanna Tennis Complex, New Delhi, India (outdoor hard)
- Date: 19–24 April

The nine teams were divided into two pools of four and five teams. The teams that finished first and second in the pools played-off to determine which team would partake in the World Group play-offs. The two nations coming second-last and last in the pools also played-off to determine which two would be relegated to Group II for 2005.

=== Pools ===
	Pool A	THA	NZL	CHN	PHI
1	Thailand (3–0)		2–1	2–1	3–0
2	New Zealand (2–1)	1–2		2–1	3–0
3	China (1–2)	1–2	1–2		3–0
4	Philippines (0–3)	0–3	0–3	0–3	

	Pool B	INA	IND	KOR	TPE	UZB
1	Indonesia (4–0)		2–1	2–1	3–0	2–1
2	India (3–1)	1–2		2–1	3–0	2–1
3	South Korea (2–2)	1–2	1–2		3–0	2–1
4	Chinese Taipei (1–3)	0–3	0–3	0–3		2–1
5	Uzbekistan (0–4)	1–2	1–2	1–2	1–2	

=== Play-offs ===
Placing	A Team	Score	B Team
Promotion	Thailand	2–0	India
Promotion	New Zealand	1–2	Indonesia
5th	N/A		South Korea
Relegation	China	2–1	Uzbekistan
Relegation	Philippines	1–2	Chinese Taipei

- Thailand and Indonesia advanced to 2004 World Group play-offs.
- Uzbekistan and Philippines was relegated to Group II for 2005.

== Group II ==
- Venue: R.K. Khanna Tennis Complex, New Delhi, India (outdoor hard)
- Date: 19–24 April

The five teams played in one pool of five, with the two teams placing first and second in the pool advancing to Group I for 2005.

=== Pool ===
	Pool	KAZ	SIN	POC	SYR	TKM
1	Kazakhstan (4–0)		3–0	3–0	3–0	3–0
2	Singapore (3–1)	0–3		2–1	2–1	3–0
3	Pacific Oceania (2–2)	0–3	1–2		3–0	3–0
4	Syria (1–3)	0–3	1–2	0–3		2–1
5	Turkmenistan (0–4)	0–3	0–3	0–3	1–2	

- Kazakhstan and Singapore advanced to Group I for 2005.

== See also ==
- Fed Cup structure
