= 2003 Fed Cup Asia/Oceania Zone =

Subsection of tennis competition

The Asia/Oceania Zone was one of three zones of regional competition in the 2003 Fed Cup.

== Group I ==
- Venue: Tokyo, Japan (outdoor hard)
- Date: 21–25 April

The eleven teams were divided into two pools of five and six teams. The teams that finished first and second in the pools played-off to determine which team would partake in the World Group play-offs. The two nations coming last in the pools were relegated to Group II for 2004.

=== Pools ===
	Pool A	JPN	CHN	KOR	NZL	HKG
1	Japan (4–0)		2–0	2–1	3–0	2–0
2	China (3–1)	0–2		2–0	3–0	3–0
3	South Korea (2–2)	1–2	0–2		2–0	3–0
4	New Zealand (1–3)	0–3	0–3	0–2		3–0
5	Hong Kong (0–4)	0–2	0–3	0–3	0–3	

	Pool B	INA	THA	TPE	UZB	MAS	KAZ
1	Indonesia (4–1)		1–2	3–0	3–0	3–0	3–0
2	Thailand (4–1)	2–1		1–2	2–1	3–0	3–0
3	Chinese Taipei (4–1)	0–3	2–1		2–1	2–1	2–0
4	Uzbekistan (2–3)	0–3	1–2	1–2		3–0	2–0
5	Malaysia (1–4)	0–3	0–3	1–2	0–3		2–1
6	Kazakhstan (0–5)	0–3	0–3	0–2	0–2	1–2	

=== Play-offs ===
A Team	Score	B Team
Japan	3–0	Thailand
China	1–2	Indonesia

- Japan and Indonesia advanced to 2003 World Group play-offs.
- Hong Kong and Kazakhstan relegated to Group II in 2004.

== Group II ==
- Venue: Tokyo, Japan (outdoor hard)
- Date: 21–24 April

The four teams played in one pool of four, with the two teams placing first and second in the pool advancing to Group I for 2004.

=== Pool ===
	Pool	IND	PHI	POC	KGZ
1	India (3–0)		3–0	2–0	3–0
2	Philippines (2–1)	0–3		3–0	3–0
3	Pacific Oceania (1–2)	0–2	0–3		3–0
4	Kyrgyzstan (0–3)	0–3	0–3	0–3	

- India and Philippines advanced to Group I for 2004.

== See also ==
- Fed Cup structure
