= Hwang I-hsuan =

Taiwanese tennis player (born 1988)

Hwang I-hsuan 黃怡萱
- Country (sports): Chinese Taipei
- Born: 21 September 1988 (age 37) Tainan, Taiwan
- Turned pro: 2003
- Retired: 2015
- Plays: Right (two-handed backhand)
- Prize money: $79,283

Singles
- Career record: 120–115
- Highest ranking: No. 266 (11 February 2008)

Grand Slam singles results
- Australian Open: Q2 (2008)

Doubles
- Career record: 128–85
- Career titles: 10 ITF
- Highest ranking: No. 137 (23 March 2009)

Team competitions
- Fed Cup: 6–10

Hwang I-hsuan (Chinese: 黃怡萱; born 21 September 1988) is a retired Taiwanese tennis player.

Hwang won ten doubles titles on the ITF Women's Circuit in her career. On 11 February 2008, she reached her best singles ranking of world No. 266. On 23 March 2009, she peaked at No. 137 in the WTA doubles rankings.

Playing for Taiwan in Fed Cup, Hwang has a win–loss record of 6–10.

Hwang made her WTA Tour main-draw debut at the 2007 Korea Open, in the doubles event partnering Yoo Mi.

Hwang also played in the doubles events of the 2008 Hobart International partnering Lee Ye-ra, and the 2009 HP Open partnering Chan Chin-wei.

Hwang retired from professional tennis 2015.

== ITF Circuit finals ==
=== Singles (0–6) ===
Legend $25,000 tournaments $10,000 tournaments	Finals by surface Hard (0–6)

Result	No.	Date	Tournament	Surface	Opponent	Score
Loss	1.	2 October 2005	ITF Balikpapan, Indonesia	Hard	(Chinese Taipei) Hsu Wen-hsin	3–6, 6–7^{(4)}
Loss	2.	12 June 2006	ITF Incheon, South Korea	Hard	(Chinese Taipei) Chan Chin-wei	1–6, 4–6
Loss	3.	5 November 2007	ITF Port Pirie, Australia	Hard	(Romania) Monica Niculescu	1–6, 2–6
Loss	4.	31 August 2008	ITF Saitama, Japan	Hard	(Japan) Sachie Ishizu	1–6, 2–6
Loss	5.	15 March 2009	ITF North Shore City, New Zealand	Hard	(Hong Kong) Zhang Ling	1–6, 0–6
Loss	6.	15 June 2009	ITF Pattaya, Thailand	Hard	(Indonesia) Ayu Fani Damayanti	6–7^{(3)}, 4–6

=== Doubles (10–9) ===
Legend $100,000 tournaments $50,000 tournaments $25,000 tournaments $10,000 tournaments	Finals by surface Hard (6–4) Clay (2–2) Carpet (2–3)

Result	No.	Date	Tournament	Surface	Partner	Opponents	Score
Win	1.	4 May 2003	ITF Jakarta, Indonesia	Clay	(Chinese Taipei) Chuang Chia-jung	(Indonesia) Sandy Gumulya (Indonesia) Septi Mende	6–4, 6–3
Loss	1.	17 August 2003	ITF Colombo, Sri Lanka	Clay	(Thailand) Varanya Vijuksanaboon	(India) Rushmi Chakravarthi (India) Sai Jayalakshmy Jayaram	0–6, 0–6
Loss	2.	4 December 2004	ITF Bangkok, Thailand	Hard	(Thailand) Nudnida Luangnam	(Uzbekistan) Akgul Amanmuradova (Thailand) Napaporn Tongsalee	4–6, 4–6
Loss	3.	11 September 2005	ITF Beijing, China	Hard	(Chinese Taipei) Chan Yung-jan	(Japan) Maki Arai (South Korea) Kim So-jung	4–6, 0–6
Loss	4.	2 October 2005	ITF Balikpapan, Indonesia	Clay	(Chinese Taipei) Hsu Wen-hsin	(Chinese Taipei) Chen Yi (Chinese Taipei) Kao Shao-yuan	3–6, 5–7
Win	2.	13 February 2007	ITF Melbourne, Australia	Clay	(South Korea) Lee Ye-ra	(Japan) Natsumi Hamamura (Japan) Ayumi Morita	6–2, 6–1
Loss	5.	21 March 2008	ITF Sorrento, Australia	Hard	(Chinese Taipei) Chang Kai-chen	(Australia) Monique Adamczak (United Kingdom) Melanie South	2–6, 4–6
Win	3.	18 May 2008	ITF Kurume, Japan	Carpet	(Chinese Taipei) Chang Kai-chen	(Japan) Erika Sema (Japan) Yurika Sema	6–3, 2–6, [10–6]
Loss	6.	31 May 2008	ITF Gunma, Japan	Carpet	(Chinese Taipei) Chang Kai-chen	(Japan) Erika Sema (Japan) Yurika Sema	3–6, 6–2, [7–10]
Win	4.	31 August 2008	ITF Saitama, Japan	Hard	(Chinese Taipei) Hsu Wen-hsin	(Japan) Airi Hagimoto (Japan) Maiko Inoue	6–4, 6–3
Win	5.	6 September 2008	ITF Tsukuba, Japan	Hard	(Chinese Taipei) Chan Chin-wei	(Japan) Maki Arai (Japan) Yurika Sema	6–0, 6–4
Loss	7.	26 October 2008	ITF Taipei, Taiwan	Carpet (i)	(Chinese Taipei) Hsu Wen-hsin	(Chinese Taipei) Chuang Chia-jung (Chinese Taipei) Hsieh Su-wei	3–6, 3–6
Win	6.	15 November 2008	ITF Pune, India	Hard	(Chinese Taipei) Chang Kai-chen	(Romania) Elora Dabija (Serbia) Bojana Jovanovski	5–7, 6–2, [10–7]
Loss	8.	24 November 2008	ITF Perth, Australia	Hard	(United Kingdom) Jade Curtis	(United States) Alexis Prousis (United States) Robin Stephenson	6–7^{(3)}, 6–7^{(4)}
Win	7.	22 December 2008	ITF Delhi, India	Hard	(Hong Kong) Zhang Ling	(United Kingdom) Emily Webley-Smith (United States) Megan Moulton-Levy	6–3, 7–6^{(4)}
Win	8.	15 June 2009	ITF Pattaya, Thailand	Hard	(Chinese Taipei) Juan Ting-fei	(Indonesia) Ayu Fani Damayanti (Indonesia) Lavinia Tananta	6–4, 6–2
Win	9.	21 August 2009	ITF Pingguo, China	Hard	(Chinese Taipei) Chan Chin-Wei	(China) Lu Jingjing (China) Sun Shengnan	3–6, 7–5 [10–7]
Win	10.	13 September 2009	ITF Noto, Japan	Carpet	(Chinese Taipei) Hsu Wen-hsin	(China) Han Xinyun (South Korea) Kim So-jung	6–3, 1–6, [11–9]
Loss	9.	28 September 2009	ITF Hamanako, Japan	Carpet	(Indonesia) Yayuk Basuki	(United States) Carly Gullickson (Australia) Nicole Kriz	6–4, 6–7^{(2)}, [5–10]

== Fed Cup participation ==
=== Singles ===
Edition	Round	Date	Location	Against	Surface	Opponent	W/L	Score
2004 Fed Cup	Asia/Oceania Zone	20 April 2004	New Delhi, India	Uzbekistan	Hard	Ivanna Israilova	L	6–4, 3–6, 5–7
2004 Fed Cup	Asia/Oceania Zone	21 April 2004	New Delhi, India	Indonesia	Hard	Sandy Gumulya	L	6–2, 3–6, 2–6
2004 Fed Cup	Asia/Oceania Zone	22 April 2004	New Delhi, India	South Korea	Hard	Kim Jin-hee	L	2–6, 0–6
2004 Fed Cup	Asia/Oceania Zone	24 April 2004	New Delhi, India	Philippines	Hard	Anna-Patricia Santos	W	6–3, 6–3
2009 Fed Cup	Asia/Oceania Zone	4 February 2009	Perth, Australia	Thailand	Hard	Suchanun Viratprasert	L	6–7^{(3)}, 1–6
2009 Fed Cup	Asia/Oceania Zone	5 February 2009	Perth, Australia	South Korea	Hard	Lee Jin-a	L	3–6, 6–4, 5–7
2009 Fed Cup	Asia/Oceania Zone	6 February 2009	Perth, Australia	Australia	Hard	Casey Dellacqua	L	1–6, 1–6
2009 Fed Cup	Asia/Oceania Zone	7 February 2009	Perth, Australia	India	Hard	Rushmi Chakravarthi	W	6–2, 7–5

=== Doubles ===
Edition	Round	Date	Location	Against	Surface	Partner	Opponents	W/L	Score
2004 Fed Cup	Asia/Oceania Zone	19 April 2004	New Delhi, India	India	Hard	Wang Ting-wen	Manisha Malhotra; Sania Mirza	L	5–7, 1–6
2004 Fed Cup	Asia/Oceania Zone	22 April 2004	New Delhi, India	South Korea	Hard	Wang I-ting	Chang Kyung-mi; Cho Yoon-jeong	L	3–6, 6–7^{(2)}
2004 Fed Cup	Asia/Oceania Zone	24 April 2004	New Delhi, India	Philippines	Hard	Wang I-ting	Czarina Arevalo; Anna-Patricia Santos	W	2–6, 7–6^{(1)}, [12–10]
2007 Fed Cup	Asia/Oceania Zone	18 April 2007	Christchurch, New Zealand	Jordan	Hard	Hsu Wen-hsin	Sahar Al Disi; Leen Irani	W	6–0, 6–0
2007 Fed Cup	Asia/Oceania Zone	19 April 2007	Christchurch, New Zealand	New Zealand	Hard	Hsu Wen-hsin	Leanne Baker; Dianne Hollands	L	6–4, 6–7^{(5)}, 1–6
2007 Fed Cup	Asia/Oceania Zone	20 April 2007	Christchurch, New Zealand	India	Hard	Hsu Wen-hsin	Ankita Bhambri; Tara Iyer	W	6–4, 6–0
2007 Fed Cup	Asia/Oceania Zone	21 April 2007	Christchurch, New Zealand	Thailand	Hard	Hsu Wen-hsin	Montinee Tangphong; Nungnadda Wannasuk	W	7–6^{(2)}, 6–2
2009 Fed Cup	Asia/Oceania Zone	4 February 2009	Perth, Australia	Thailand	Hard	Chuang Chia-jung	Noppawan Lertcheewakarn; Tamarine Tanasugarn	L	1–6, 7–6^{(5)}, 1–6
