= 2003 Fed Cup Asia/Oceania Zone Group I – play-offs =

International tennis competition play-offs

The play-offs of the 2003 Fed Cup Asia/Oceania Zone Group I were the final stages of the Group I Zonal Competition involving teams from Asia and Oceania. Those that qualified for this stage placed first and second in their respective pools.

Placing	Pool A	Pool B
1	Japan	Indonesia
2	China	Thailand
3	South Korea	Chinese Taipei
4	New Zealand	Uzbekistan
5	Hong Kong	Malaysia
6		Kazakhstan

The four teams were then paired up the team from a different placing of the other group for a play-off tie, with the winners being promoted to the World Group play-offs.

== Japan vs. Thailand ==
Japan
3
Tokyo, Japan
26 April 2003
Hard (outdoors)

Thailand
0

			1	2	3
1	(Japan) (Thailand)	Shinobu Asagoe; Suchanun Viratprasert	1; 6	6; 0	6; 4
2	(Japan) (Thailand)	Ai Sugiyama; Tamarine Tanasugarn	4; 6	6; 3	6; 4
3	(Japan) (Thailand)	Rika Fujiwara / Saori Obata; Prariyawan Ratanakrong / Napaporn Tongsalee	6; 1	6; 4

- Japan advanced to the World Group play-offs, where they were drawn against Sweden. They won 4–1, and plus qualified for the 2004 World Group.

== China vs. Indonesia ==
China
1
Tokyo, Japan
26 April 2003
Hard (outdoors)

Indonesia
2

			1	2	3
1	(China) (Indonesia)	Sun Tiantian; Wynne Prakusya	6; 0	6^{7} 7^{9}	7; 5
2	(China) (Indonesia)	Zheng Jie; Angelique Widjaja	3; 6	3; 6
3	(China) (Indonesia)	Li Ting / Sun Tiantian; Wynne Prakusya / Angelique Widjaja	7; 5	4; 6	3; 6

- Indonesia advanced to the World Group play-offs, where they were drawn against Germany. They lost 2–3, and were relegated to Group I for 2004.

== See also ==
- Fed Cup structure
