= 2003 Fed Cup Asia/Oceania Zone Group I – Pool B =

International tennis competition

Group B of the 2003 Fed Cup Asia/Oceania Zone Group I was one of two pools in the Asia/Oceania zone of the 2003 Fed Cup. Six teams competed in a round robin competition, with the top two teams advancing to the play-offs and the bottom team being relegated to Group II for the following year.

		(Indonesia) INA	(Chinese Taipei) TPE	(Thailand) THA	(Uzbekistan) UZB	(Malaysia) MAS	(Kazakhstan) KAZ	Match; W–L	Set; W–L	Game; W–L	Standings
19	Indonesia		3–0	1–2	3–0	3–0	3–0	4–1	27–6	182–83	1
22	Chinese Taipei	0–3		2–1	2–1	2–1	2–0	4–1	17–13	138–121	3
37	Thailand	2–1	1–2		2–1	3–0	3–0	4–1	24–9	170–108	2
38	Uzbekistan	0–3	1–2	1–2		3–0	2–0	2–3	16–17	150–142	4
51	Malaysia	0–3	1–2	0–3	0–3		2–1	1–4	6–25	74–166	5
60	Kazakhstan	0–3	0–2	0–3	0–2	1–2		0–5	4–24	65–159	6

== Indonesia vs. Chinese Taipei ==
Indonesia
3
Tokyo, Japan
21 April 2003
Hard (outdoors)

Chinese Taipei
0

			1	2	3
1	(Indonesia) (Chinese Taipei)	Wynne Prakusya; Chuang Chia-jung	6; 3	6; 2
2	(Indonesia) (Chinese Taipei)	Angelique Widjaja; Hsieh Su-wei	6; 0	6; 4
3	(Indonesia) (Chinese Taipei)	Wynne Prakusya / Angelique Widjaja; Chan Chin-wei / Wang I-ting	6; 2	6; 4

== Thailand vs. Uzbekistan ==
Thailand
2
Tokyo, Japan
21 April 2003
Hard (outdoors)

Uzbekistan
1

			1	2	3
1	(Thailand) (Uzbekistan)	Suchanun Viratprasert; Ivanna Israilova	2; 6	7^{8} 6^{6}	2; 6
2	(Thailand) (Uzbekistan)	Tamarine Tanasugarn; Iroda Tulyaganova	7; 5	7; 5
3	(Thailand) (Uzbekistan)	Tamarine Tanasugarn / Napaporn Tongsalee; Ivanna Israilova / Iroda Tulyaganova	6; 2	6; 1

== Malaysia vs. Kazakhstan ==
Malaysia
2
Tokyo, Japan
21 April 2003
Hard (outdoors)

Kazakhstan
1

			1	2	3
1	(Malaysia) (Kazakhstan)	Liaw Chen-Yee; Marina Spakova	3; 6	0; 6
2	(Malaysia) (Kazakhstan)	Khoo Chin-bee; Karina Jarlkaganova	6; 0	6; 1
3	(Malaysia) (Kazakhstan)	Khoo Chin-bee / Liaw Chen-Yee; Marina Spakova / Elvira Yussupova	6; 2	6^{6} 7^{8}	6; 2

== Indonesia vs. Kazakhstan ==
Indonesia
3
Tokyo, Japan
22 April 2003
Hard (outdoors)

Kazakhstan
0

			1	2	3
1	(Indonesia) (Kazakhstan)	Wynne Prakusya; Marina Spakova	6; 1	6; 0
2	(Indonesia) (Kazakhstan)	Angelique Widjaja; Karina Jarlkaganova	6; 0	6; 0
3	(Indonesia) (Kazakhstan)	Wynne Prakusya / Angelique Widjaja; Karina Jarlkaganova / Marina Spakova	6; 2	6; 1

== Chinese Taipei vs. Uzbekistan ==
Chinese Taipei
2
Tokyo, Japan
22 April 2003
Hard (outdoors)

Uzbekistan
1

			1	2	3
1	(Chinese Taipei) (Uzbekistan)	Chuang Chia-jung; Akgul Amanmuradova	7^{7} 6^{4}	6; 2
2	(Chinese Taipei) (Uzbekistan)	Hsieh Su-wei; Iroda Tulyaganova	0; 6	6; 2	4; 6
3	(Chinese Taipei) (Uzbekistan)	Chuang Chia-jung / Hsieh Su-wei; Akgul Amanmuradova / Iroda Tulyaganova	6; 2	7^{7} 6^{4}

== Thailand vs. Malaysia ==
Thailand
2
Tokyo, Japan
22 April 2003
Hard (outdoors)

Malaysia
1

			1	2	3
1	(Thailand) (Malaysia)	Suchanun Viratprasert; Norzafira Taufik	6; 0	6; 1
2	(Thailand) (Malaysia)	Tamarine Tanasugarn; Liaw Chen-Yee	6; 1	6; 2
3	(Thailand) (Malaysia)	Prariyawan Ratanakrong / Napaporn Tongsalee; Liaw Chen-Yee / Norzafira Taufik	6; 0	6; 0

== Indonesia vs. Thailand ==
Indonesia
1
Tokyo, Japan
23 April 2003
Hard (outdoors)

Thailand
2

			1	2	3
1	(Indonesia) (Thailand)	Wynne Prakusya; Suchanun Viratprasert	2; 6	6; 1	1; 6
2	(Indonesia) (Thailand)	Angelique Widjaja; Tamarine Tanasugarn	3; 6	6^{2} 7^{7}
3	(Indonesia) (Thailand)	Wynne Prakusya / Angelique Widjaja; Prariyawan Ratanakrong / Napaporn Tongsalee	6; 2	7; 5

== Chinese Taipei vs. Kazakhstan ==
Chinese Taipei
2
Tokyo, Japan
23 April 2003
Hard (outdoors)

Kazakhstan
0

			1	2	3
1	(Chinese Taipei) (Kazakhstan)	Wang I-ting; Marina Spakova	6; 2	6; 1
2	(Chinese Taipei) (Kazakhstan)	Chuang Chia-jung; Karina Jarlkaganova	6; 3	6; 3
3	(Chinese Taipei) (Kazakhstan)	Chan Chin-wei / Hsieh Su-wei; Karina Jarlkaganova / Marina Spakova				not played

== Uzbekistan vs. Malaysia ==
Uzbekistan
2
Tokyo, Japan
23 April 2003
Hard (outdoors)

Malaysia
1

			1	2	3
1	(Uzbekistan) (Malaysia)	Ivanna Israilova; Liaw Chen-Yee	6; 0	6; 4
2	(Uzbekistan) (Malaysia)	Iroda Tulyaganova; Khoo Chin-bee	6; 1	6; 4
3	(Uzbekistan) (Malaysia)	Akgul Amanmuradova / Ivanna Israilova; Liaw Chen-Yee / Norzafira Taufik	6; 0	6; 2

== Indonesia vs. Uzbekistan ==
Indonesia
3
Tokyo, Japan
24 April 2003
Hard (outdoors)

Uzbekistan
0

			1	2	3
1	(Indonesia) (Uzbekistan)	Wynne Prakusya; Ivanna Israilova	4; 6	6; 1	6; 3
2	(Indonesia) (Uzbekistan)	Angelique Widjaja; Iroda Tulyaganova	3; 6	6; 1	6; 3
3	(Indonesia) (Uzbekistan)	Wynne Prakusya / Angelique Widjaja; Akgul Amanmuradova / Ivanna Israilova	6; 2	6; 1

== Chinese Taipei vs. Malaysia ==
Chinese Taipei
2
Tokyo, Japan
24 April 2003
Hard (outdoors)

Malaysia
1

			1	2	3
1	(Chinese Taipei) (Malaysia)	Chan Chin-wei; Liaw Chen-Yee	6; 1	6; 1
2	(Chinese Taipei) (Malaysia)	Hsieh Su-wei; Khoo Chin-bee	5; 7	5; 7
3	(Chinese Taipei) (Malaysia)	Chan Chin-wei / Chuang Chia-jung; Khoo Chin-bee / Liaw Chen-Yee	6; 1	6; 1

== Thailand vs. Kazakhstan ==
Thailand
2
Tokyo, Japan
24 April 2003
Hard (outdoors)

Kazakhstan
1

			1	2	3
1	(Thailand) (Kazakhstan)	Napaporn Tongsalee; Marina Spakova	6; 2	6; 3
2	(Thailand) (Kazakhstan)	Suchanun Viratprasert; Karina Jarlkaganova	6; 2	6; 0
3	(Thailand) (Kazakhstan)	Prariyawan Ratanakrong / Napaporn Tongsalee; Karina Jarlkaganova / Marina Spakova	6; 2	6; 4

== Indonesia vs. Malaysia ==
Indonesia
3
Tokyo, Japan
25 April 2003
Hard (outdoors)

Malaysia
0

			1	2	3
1	(Indonesia) (Malaysia)	Wynne Prakusya; Liaw Chen-Yee	6; 1	6; 2
2	(Indonesia) (Malaysia)	Angelique Widjaja; Khoo Chin-bee	6; 3	6; 0
3	(Indonesia) (Malaysia)	Suzanna Anggarkusuma / Sandy Gumulya; Liaw Chen-Yee / Norzafira Taufik	6; 1	6; 1

== Chinese Taipei vs. Thailand ==
Chinese Taipei
2
Tokyo, Japan
25 April 2003
Hard (outdoors)

Thailand
1

			1	2	3
1	(Chinese Taipei) (Thailand)	Chuang Chia-jung; Suchanun Viratprasert	4; 6	6; 2	6; 0
2	(Chinese Taipei) (Thailand)	Hsieh Su-wei; Tamarine Tanasugarn	0; 6	0; 6
3	(Chinese Taipei) (Thailand)	Chuang Chia-jung / Hsieh Su-wei; Tamarine Tanasugarn / Napaporn Tongsalee	6; 2	7^{7} 6^{3}

== Uzbekistan vs. Kazakhstan ==
Uzbekistan
2
Tokyo, Japan
25 April 2003
Hard (outdoors)

Kazakhstan
0

			1	2	3
1	(Uzbekistan) (Kazakhstan)	Ivanna Israilova; Marina Spakova	6; 3	6^{5} 7^{7}	6; 3
2	(Uzbekistan) (Kazakhstan)	Akgul Amanmuradova; Karina Jarlkaganova	6; 2	6; 0
3	(Uzbekistan) (Kazakhstan)	Akgul Amanmuradova / Ivanna Israilova; Karina Jarlkaganova / Marina Spakova				not played

- Kazakhstan failed to win any ties in the pool, and thus was relegated to Group II in 2004, where they finished first overall and thus advanced back to Group I for 2005.

== See also ==
- Fed Cup structure
