= 2007 Fed Cup Asia/Oceania Zone =

Subsection of tennis competition

The Asia/Oceania Zone was one of three zones of regional competition in the 2007 Fed Cup.

== Group I ==
- Venue: Scenic Circles Hotel Tennis Centre, Christchurch, New Zealand (outdoor hard)
- Date: 16–21 April

The ten teams were divided into two pools of five teams. The top teams of each pool played-off against each other to decide which nation progresses to the World Group II Play-offs.

=== Pools ===
	Pool A	THA	UZB	HKG	KOR	SIN
1	Thailand (3–1)		1–2	3–0	2–1	2–1
2	Uzbekistan (3–1)	2–1		1–2	2–1	3–0
3	Hong Kong (3–1)	0–3	2–1		2–1	3–0
4	South Korea (1–3)	1–2	1–2	1–2		2–1
5	Singapore (0–4)	1–2	0–3	0–3	1–2	

	Pool B	TPE	IND	NZL	KAZ	JOR
1	Chinese Taipei (4–0)		3–0	2–1	3–0	3–0
2	India (3–1)	0–3		2–1	3–0	3–0
3	New Zealand (2–2)	1–2	1–2		3–0	3–0
4	Kazakhstan (1–3)	0–3	0–3	0–3		3–0
5	Jordan (0–4)	0–3	0–3	0–3	0–3	

=== Play-offs ===
Placing	A Team	Score	B Team
Promotion	Thailand	0–3	Chinese Taipei
3rd–4th	Uzbekistan	3–0	India
5th–6th	Hong Kong	1–2	New Zealand
7th–8th	South Korea	3–0	Kazakhstan
9th–10th	Singapore	3–0	Jordan

- Chinese Taipei advanced to the World Group II Play-offs.

== Withdrawals ==
Sri Lanka and Syria were scheduled to compete, but withdrew because of a terrorist threat.

== See also ==
- Fed Cup structure
