= 2005 Fed Cup Asia/Oceania Zone =

Regional zone of tennis competition

The Asia/Oceania Zone was one of three zones of regional competition in the 2005 Fed Cup.

== Group I ==
- Venue: R.K. Khanna Tennis Complex, New Delhi, India (outdoor hard)
- Date: 20–23 April

The eight teams were divided into two pools of four teams. The teams that finished first and second in the pools played-off to determine which team would partake in the World Group play-offs. The two nations coming second-last and last in the pools also played-off to determine which two would be relegated to Group II for 2005.

=== Pools ===
	Pool A	CHN	IND	KAZ	SIN
1	China (3–0)		3–0	3–0	3–0
2	India (2–1)	0–3		3–0	3–0
3	Kazakhstan (1–2)	0–3	0–3		2–1
4	Singapore (0–3)	0–3	0–3	1–2	

	Pool B	AUS	KOR	NZL	TPE
1	Australia (3–0)		2–1	3–0	3–0
2	South Korea (2–1)	1–2		2–1	3–0
3	New Zealand (1–2)	0–3	1–2		3–0
4	Chinese Taipei (0–3)	0–3	0–3	0–3	

=== Play-offs ===
Placing	A Team	Score	B Team
Promotion	China	2–0	Australia
3rd–4th	India	2–1	South Korea
Relegation	Kazakhstan	0–2	Chinese Taipei
Relegation	Singapore	0–2	New Zealand

- China advanced to 2005 World Group II play-offs.
- Kazakhstan and Singapore was relegated to Group II for 2006.

== Group II ==
- Venue: R.K. Khanna Tennis Complex, New Delhi, India (outdoor hard)
- Date: 19–21 April

The four teams played in one pool of four, with the two teams placing first and second in the pool advancing to Group I for 2006.

=== Pool ===
	Pool	UZB	PHI	SYR	TKM
1	Uzbekistan (3–0)		3–0	3–0	3–0
2	Philippines (2–1)	0–3		3–0	3–0
3	Syria (1–2)	0–3	0–3		2–1
4	Turkmenistan (0–3)	0–3	0–3	1–2	

- Uzbekistan and Philippines advanced to Group I for 2006.

== See also ==
- Fed Cup structure
