= 2009 Fed Cup Asia/Oceania Zone =

Subsection of tennis competition

The Asia/Oceania Zone was one of three zones of regional competition in the 2009 Fed Cup.

== Group I ==
- Venue: State Tennis Centre, Perth, Western Australia (outdoor hard)
- Dates: 4–7 February

The eight teams were divided into two pools of four teams. The teams that finished first in the pools played-off to determine which team would partake in the World Group II Play-offs. The two nations coming last in the pools also played-off to determine which would be relegated to Group II for 2010.

=== Pools ===
	Pool A	NZL	INA	UZB	IND
1	New Zealand (3–0)		2–1	2–1	3–0
2	Indonesia (2–1)	1–2		2–1	3–0
3	Uzbekistan (1–2)	1–2	1–2		3–0
4	India (0–3)	0–3	0–3	0–3	

	Pool B	AUS	THA	KOR	TPE
1	Australia (3–0)		3–0	3–0	3–0
2	Thailand (2–1)	0–3		3–0	3–0
3	South Korea (1–2)	0–3	0–3		2–1
4	Chinese Taipei (0–3)	0–3	0–3	1–2	

=== Play-offs ===
Placing	A Team	Score	B Team
Promotion	New Zealand	0–3	Australia
3rd–4th	Indonesia	0–3	Thailand
5th–6th	Uzbekistan	2–1	South Korea
Relegation	India	0–3	Chinese Taipei

- Australia advanced to 2009 World Group II Play-offs.
- India was relegated to Group II for 2010.

== Group II ==
- Venue: State Tennis Center, Perth, Western Australia (hard - outdoors)
- Date: 4–6 February

The four teams played in one pool of four, with the team placing first advancing to Group I for 2010.

=== Pool ===
	Pool	KAZ	HKG	SIN	IRI
1	Kazakhstan (3–0)		3–0	3–0	3–0
2	Hong Kong (2–1)	0–3		3–0	3–0
3	Singapore (1–2)	0–3	0–3		3–0
4	Iran (0–3)	0–3	0–3	0–3	

- Kazakhstan advanced to Group I for 2010.

Previously, Pacific Oceania, Philippines, Sri Lanka, Syria and Turkmenistan had also been listed to compete.

== See also ==
- Fed Cup structure
