= Japan Billie Jean King Cup team =

Japanese national women's tennis team

Japan
- Captain: Ai Sugiyama
- ITF ranking: 14 ▲ (03 December 2024)
- Colors: Red & White
- First year: 1964
- Years played: 56
- Ties played (W–L): 177 (109–68)
- Years in World Group: 30 (12–27)
- Best finish: World Group SF (1996)
- Most total wins: Kazuko Sawamatsu (44–10)
- Most singles wins: Kazuko Sawamatsu (25–5)
- Most doubles wins: Shuko Aoyama (25–6)
- Best doubles team: Shuko Aoyama / Eri Hozumi (15–3)
- Most ties played: Shuko Aoyama (31)
- Most years played: Ai Sugiyama (12)

The Japan women's national tennis team represents Japan in Fed Cup tennis competition and are governed by the Japan Tennis Association. Most recently, in 2024, they qualified for the finals by beating Kazakhstan in April, and then reached the quarter-finals of the competition with a win over Romania in November.

== History ==
Japan competed in its first Federation Cup in 1964, the second year of the competition after it was launched in 1963. This inaugural team consisted of Kazuko Kuromatsu, Reiko Miyagi, and Yohko Obata.

The best result for the Japanese team was reaching the semifinals in 1996.

== Current Players ==
=== Most recent squad ===
Team representing Japan in 2024 Billie Jean King Cup finals
Name	Born	First Tie	Last Tie		Ties	Win/Loss		
Name	Born	First Tie	Year	Opponent	Ties	Sin	Dou	Tot
Shuko Aoyama	19 December 1987 (age 38)	2013	2024	Italy	31	0–0	25–6	25–6
Nao Hibino	28 November 1994 (age 31)	2016	2024	Romania	13	9–7	0–0	9–7
Eri Hozumi	17 February 1994 (age 31)	2015	2024	Italy	18	3–1	15–3	18–4
Ena Shibahara	12 February 1998 (age 27)	2021	2024	Italy	11	2–0	8–1	10–1
Moyuka Uchijima	11 August 2001 (age 24)	2022	2024	Italy	9	6–4	0–0	6–4

=== Other recent players ===
The following players have been in team squads in the last two years
Name	Born	First Tie	Last Tie		Ties	Win/Loss		
Name	Born	First Tie	Year	Opponent	Ties	Sin	Dou	Tot
Misaki Doi	29 April 1991 (age 34)	2011	2022	Ukraine	20	10–10	1–2	11–12
Mai Hontama	30 August 1999 (age 26)	2022	2023	Colombia	9	8–2	0–0	8–2
Yuki Naito	16 February 2001 (age 24)	2021	2022	China	4	2–3	0–0	2–3
Naomi Osaka	16 October 1997 (age 28)	2017	2024	Kazakhstan	7	6–2	0–0	6–2
Himeno Sakatsume	3 August 2001 (age 24)	2023	2023	China	2	2–0	0–0	2–0

== Results ==
Year	Competition	Date	Location	Opponent	Score	Result
2003	Group I, Asia/Oceania Pool A Round Robin, 1st Round	21 April	Ariake Tennis Park and Colosseum, Tokyo, Japan	South Korea	2–1	Won
2003	Group I, Asia/Oceania Pool A Round Robin, 1st Round	22 April	Tokyo, Japan	New Zealand	3–0	Won
2003	Group I, Asia/Oceania Pool A Round Robin, 1st Round	23 April	Tokyo, Japan	China	2–0	Won
2003	Group I, Asia/Oceania Pool A Round Robin, 1st Round	25 April	Tokyo, Japan	Hong Kong	2–0	Won
2003	Group I, Asia/Oceania Play-offs	26 April	Tokyo, Japan	Thailand	3–0	Won
2003	World Group Play-Offs	19–20 July	Gifu, Japan	Sweden	4–1	Won
2004	World Group	24–25 April	Buenos Aires, Argentina	Argentina	2–3	Loss
2004	World Group Play-Offs	10–11 July	Plovdiv, Bulgaria	Bulgaria	3–2	Won
2005	World Group II, 1st Round	23–24 April	Prague, Czech Republic	Czech Republic	2–3	Loss
2005	World Group II, Playoffs	9–10 July	Tokyo, Japan	Bulgaria	4–1	Won
2006	World Group II, 1st Round	22–23 April	Tokyo, Japan	Switzerland	4–1	Won
2006	World Group I, Playoffs	15–16 July	Tokyo, Japan	Austria	5–0	Won
2007	World Group I, 1st Round	21–22 April	Limoges, France	France	0–5	Loss
2007	World Group I, Playoffs	14–15 July	Toyota, Japan	Germany	2–3	Loss
2008	World Group II, 1st Round	2–3 February	Miki-shi, Japan	Croatia	4–1	Won
2008	World Group I, Playoffs	26–27 April	Tokyo, Japan	France	1–4	Loss
2009	World Group II, 1st Round	7–8 February	Belgrade, Serbia	Serbia	1–4	Loss
2009	World Group II, Playoffs	25–26 April	Gdynia, Poland	Poland	2–3	Loss
2010	Group I, Asia/Oceania, Group A Round Robin, 1st Round	3 February	National Tennis Centre, Kuala Lumpur, Malaysia	India	3–0	Won
2010	Group I, Asia/Oceania, Group A Round Robin, 1st Round	4 February	Kuala Lumpur, Malaysia	New Zealand	3–0	Won
2010	Group I, Asia/Oceania, Group A Round Robin, 1st Round	5 February	Kuala Lumpur, Malaysia	South Korea	3–0	Won
2010	Group I, Asia/Oceania, Promotional Play-off	6 February	Kuala Lumpur, Malaysia	Chinese Taipei	2–1	Won
2010	World Group II, Playoff	24–25 April	Maribor, Slovenia	Slovenia	1–4	Loss
2011	Group I, Asia/Oceania, Group B Round Robin, 1st Round	2 February	National Tennis Centre, Nonthaburi, Thailand	Kazakhstan	2–1	Won
2011	Group I, Asia/Oceania, Group B Round Robin, 1st Round	3 February	Nonthaburi, Thailand	South Korea	3–0	Won
2011	Group I, Asia/Oceania, Group B Round Robin, 1st Round	4 February	Nonthaburi, Thailand	Chinese Taipei	3–0	Won
2011	Group I, Asia/Oceania, Promotional Play-off	5 February	Nonthaburi, Thailand	Uzbekistan	3–0	Won
2011	World Group II, Play-off	16–17 July	Bourbon Beans Dome, Miki, Hyogo, Japan	Argentina	4–0	Won
2012	World Group II, 1st Round	4–5 February	Bourbon Beans Dome, Miki, Hyogo, Japan	Slovenia	5–0	Won
2012	World Group II, Play-off	21–22 April	Ariake Coliseum, Tokyo, Japan	Belgium	4–1	Won
2013	World Group I, 1st Round	9–10 February	Olympic (Indoor) Stadium, Moscow, Russia	Russia	2–3	Loss
2013	World Group I, Play-off	20–21 April	Real Club de Polo, Barcelona, Spain	Spain	0–4	Loss
2014	World Group II, 1st Round	8–9 February	Pilara Tennis Club, Pilar, Buenos Aires Province, Argentina	Argentina	1–3	Loss
2014	World Group II, Play-off	19–20 April	Maaspoort Sports and Events Arena, 's-Hertogenbosch, Netherlands	Netherlands	2–3	Loss
2015	Group I, Asia/Oceania, Group B Round Robin, 1st Round	4 February	Guangdong Olympic Tennis Centre, Guangzhou, China	South Korea	3–0	Won
2015	Group I, Asia/Oceania, Group B Round Robin, 1st Round	5 February	Guangzhou, China	Hong Kong	3–0	Won
2015	Group I, Asia/Oceania, Group B Round Robin, 1st Round	6 February	Guangzhou, China	Uzbekistan	3–0	Won
2015	Group I, Asia/Oceania, Promotional Play-off	7 February	Guangzhou, China	Kazakhstan	2–0	Won
2015	World Group II, Play-off	18–19 April	Ariake Coliseum, Tokyo, Japan	Belarus	2–3	Loss
2016	Group I, Asia/Oceania, Pool A Round Robin, 1st round	3 February	True Arena Hua Hin, Hua Hin, Thailand	Uzbekistan	1–2	Loss
2016	Group I, Asia/Oceania, Pool A Round Robin, 1st round	4 February	Hua Hin, Thailand	India	2–1	Won
2016	Group I, Asia/Oceania, Pool A Round Robin, 1st round	5 February	Hua Hin, Thailand	Thailand	2–1	Won
2016	Group I, Asia/Oceania, Promotional Play-off	6 February	Hua Hin, Thailand	Chinese Taipei	1–2	Loss
2017	Group I, Asia/Oceania, Pool B Round Robin, 1st round	8 February	National Tennis Centre, Astana, Kazakhstan	India	3–0	Won
2017	Group I, Asia/Oceania, Pool B Round Robin, 1st round	9 February	Astana, Kazakhstan	Philippines	3–0	Won
2017	Group I, Asia/Oceania, Pool B Round Robin, 1st round	10 February	Astana, Kazakhstan	China	3–0	Won
2017	Group I, Asia/Oceania, Promotional Play-off	11 February	Astana, Kazakhstan	Kazakhstan	1–2	Loss
2018	Group I, Asia/Oceania, Pool B Round Robin, 1st round	7 February	R.K. Khanna Tennis Complex, New Delhi, India	Thailand	3–0	Won
2018	Group I, Asia/Oceania, Pool B Round Robin, 1st round	8 February	New Delhi, India	South Korea	3–0	Won
2018	Group I, Asia/Oceania, Pool B Round Robin, 1st round	9 February	New Delhi, India	Chinese Taipei	3–0	Won
2018	Group I, Asia/Oceania, Promotional Play-off	10 February	New Delhi, India	Kazakhstan	2–1	Won
2018	World Group II, Play-off	21–22 April	Bourbon Beans Dome, Miki, Hyogo, Japan	Great Britain	3–2	Won
2019	World Group II, 1st Round	9–10 February	Kitakyushu Sogo Gymnastic Hall, Kitakyushu, Fukuoka, Japan	Spain	2–3	Loss
2019	World Group II, Play-off	20–21 April	Utsubo Tennis Center, Osaka, Japan	Netherlands	4–0	Won
2020-21	Qualifying Round	7–8 February 2020	Centro de Tenis la Manga Club, Cartagena, Spain	Spain	1–3	Loss
2020-21	Playoffs	16–17 April 2021	Elite Tennis Club, Chornomorsk, Ukraine	Ukraine	0–4	Loss
2022	Asia/Oceania Group I Round Robin	12 April	Megasaray Tennis Academy, Antalya, Turkey	India	3–0	Won
2022	Asia/Oceania Group I Round Robin	13 April	Megasaray Tennis Academy, Antalya, Turkey	Indonesia	3–0	Won
2022	Asia/Oceania Group I Round Robin	14 April	Megasaray Tennis Academy, Antalya, Turkey	New Zealand	3–0	Won
2022	Asia/Oceania Group I Round Robin	15 April	Megasaray Tennis Academy, Antalya, Turkey	South Korea	2–1	Won
2022	Asia/Oceania Group I Round Robin	16 April	Megasaray Tennis Academy, Antalya, Turkey	China	2–1	Won
2022	Play-offs	11–12 November	Ariake Coliseum, Tokyo, Japan	Ukraine	1–3	Loss
2023	Asia/Oceania Group I Round Robin	11 April	Olympic Tennis School, Tashkent, Uzbekistan	South Korea	3–0	Won
2023	Asia/Oceania Group I Round Robin	12 April	Olympic Tennis School, Tashkent, Uzbekistan	Thailand	2–1	Won
2023	Asia/Oceania Group I Round Robin	13 April	Olympic Tennis School, Tashkent, Uzbekistan	Uzbekistan	3–0	Won
2023	Asia/Oceania Group I Round Robin	14 April	Olympic Tennis School, Tashkent, Uzbekistan	India	3–0	Won
2023	Asia/Oceania Group I Round Robin	15 April	Olympic Tennis School, Tashkent, Uzbekistan	China	2–0	Won
2023	Play-offs	10–11 November	Ariake Coliseum, Tokyo, Japan	Colombia	3–2	Won
2024	Qualifiers	12–13 April	Ariake Coliseum, Tokyo, Japan	Kazakhstan	3–1	Won
2024	Finals (Round 1)	14 November	Martín Carpena Arena, Malaga, Spain	Romania	2–1	Won
2024	Finals (Quarter Final)	16 November	Martín Carpena Arena, Malaga, Spain	Italy	1–2	Loss

== See also ==
- Billie Jean King Cup
- Japan Davis Cup team
- Japan at the Hopman Cup
- Japan Tennis Association
