= Padmapriya Ramesh =

Indian junior tennis player

Padmapriya Ramesh (born 30 May 2012) is an Indian professional junior tennis player who plays for the national team.

== Early life and education ==
Padmapriya is from Mysore. Her father Ramesh Kumar and mother Malathi Priya are conservators of forest in Mysore. She is studying Class 8 at Excel Public School, Koorgalli, Mysore. In Class 1 she started with badminton in Ballari but soon shifted to tennis. She coaches under Raghuveer Ponnuswamy in Mysuru.

== Career ==
In 2025, Padmapriya won the Singles title at the U-14 National Series Tournament. She won the singles at the Asian U-14 tournament at Malancha Niwas, Agartala. She also won the doubles Junior ranking tennis tournament 2025 at Bahrain. In June 2024, she won both the singles and doubles in the Under 12 National series tennis tournament at the Sania Mirza Tennis Academy in Hyderabad. In December 2025, she won the U-16 Girls Singles title at AITA National Series tournament at Ash Tennis Academy, Shamirpet, Telangana. In October 2025, she partnered with Shazfa SK and defeated Aniha Gavinolla and Zoha Qureshi 6–3, 6–2 to win the title in the girls U14 doubles category and came second in the singles in the 30th Fenesta Open National Tennis Championship 2025 at the DLTA Complex in New Delhi. She In January 2026, she paired with Shazfa and entered the semifinals of the ATF 14 Under Category A tournament in Bahrain where players from 17 countries competed.

In November 2023, she came runners up along with Parinitha in the doubles AITA-OTA National Series U14 tennis tournament at Kalinga Stadium in Bhubaneswar.
