= India Billie Jean King Cup team =

Indian tennis team

India
- Captain: Vishal Uppal
- Coach: Zeeshan Ali
- ITF ranking: 29 (14 May 2026)
- Colors: blue & white
- First year: 1991
- Years played: 34
- Ties played (W–L): 140 (76–64)
- Best finish: World Group play-offs (2020-21)
- Most total wins: Ankita Raina (38–35)
- Most singles wins: Ankita Raina (21–22)
- Most doubles wins: Ankita Raina (17–3)
- Best doubles team: Manisha Malhotra / Nirupama Vaidyanathan (6–0)
- Most ties played: Ankita Raina (56)
- Most years played: Ankita Raina (13)
- Last updated on: 15 May 2026.

The India Billie Jean King Cup team represents India in the WTA & ITF Billie Jean King Cup professional tennis competition and are governed by the All India Tennis Association.

India competed in its first Fed Cup in 1977, but did not compete again until 1991. Since 1991, India has been competing annually (except 1993). India's best result was reaching the Asia/Oceania Group I final in 2006.

In 2004, Manisha Malhotra and Sania Mirza broke the record for playing the longest tiebreak (21–19) in their doubles match against Uzbekistan pair Vlada Ekshibarova and Ivanna Israilova.

== Current team ==
2025 Billie Jean King Cup
Player	Win–loss			Years played	Ties	Ranking	
Player	Singles	Doubles	Totals	Years played	Ties	Singles	Doubles
Sahaja Yamalapalli	0–4	0–1	0–5	3	5	320	501
Shrivalli Bhamidipaty	5–0	2–1	7–1	3	8	344	305
Ankita Raina	21–21	13–11	34–32	13	50	306	207
Prarthana Thombare	7–2	11–11	18–13	7	27	—N/a	2150
Maaya Rajeshwaran	—N/a	—N/a	—N/a	—	—N/a	—N/a	—N/a
Vaidehi Chaudhari	2–1	1–2	3–3	2	6	361	351

== Players ==
Name	Years	First	Ties	Win/Loss		
Name	Years	First	Ties	Singles	Doubles	Total
Sowjanya Bavisetti	1	2020	2	0–0	1–1	1–1
Ankita Bhambri	5	2004	18	6–7	2–7	8–14
Prerna Bhambri	2	2012	7	4–2	1–1	5–3
Sanaa Bhambri	2	2009	7	0–2	3–2	3–4
Riya Bhatia	3	2017	4	0–0	1–3	1–3
Rutuja Bhosale	3	2012	13	7–5	1–1	8–6
Rushmi Chakravarthi	9	1994	26	3–7	11–11	14–18
Shruti Dhawan	1	1999	2	0–0	0–2	0–2
Sheethal Goutham	1	2002	2	0–0	1–1	1–1
Tara Iyer	1	2007	4	1–1	1–2	2–3
Mahak Jain	1	2019	1	0–1	0–0	0–1
Sai Jayalakshmy Jayaram	4	1996	13	3–1	3–6	6–7
Uzma Khan	3	1997	11	9–1	0–1	9–2
Janaki Krishnamoorthy	3	1991	6	2–4	2–2	4–6
Sohini Kumari	3	1991	5	0–0	2–3	2–3
Isha Lakhani	4	2003	13	3–2	6–2	9–4
Manisha Malhotra	7	1995	27	7–11	10–4	17–15
Divya Merchant	1	1991	2	0–2	0–1	0–3
Sania Mirza	11	2003	29	13–5	14–5	27–10
Natasha Palha	1	2015	3	0–0	2–0	2–0
Jahnavi Parekh	1	1997	4	0–2	0–4	0–6
Sonal Phadke	1	2002	2	0–1	0–1	0–2
Arati Ponnappa	4	1994	14	0–6	4–7	4–13
Ankita Raina	8	2013	29	15–11	8–6	23–17
Sunitha Rao	2	2007	8	2–4	3–2	5–6
Aradhana Reddy	2	1991	6	1–3	0–1	1–5
Snehadevi Reddy	1	2017	1	0–0	0–1	0–1
Ashvarya Shrivastava	1	2011	2	0–2	1–0	1–2
Kyra Shroff	1	2013	3	0–2	0–1	0–3
Rishika Sunkara	2	2013	5	1–2	1–2	2–4
Karman Thandi	3	2017	9	3–6	2–1	5–7
Prarthana Thombare	5	2014	17	7–2	6–6	13–8
Radhika Tulpule	1	2000	1	0–0	1–0	1–0
Shikha Uberoi	4	2005	15	9–3	5–4	14–7
Nirupama Vaidyanathan	8	1992	31	20–8	9–6	29–14
Meghha Vakaria	1	2003	3	0–0	2–0	2–0
Poojashree Venkatesha	2	2010	5	2–3	2–0	4–3
Pranjala Yadlapalli	1	2018	1	0–0	1–0	1–0

== Results ==
=== 1970s ===
Year	Competition	Date	Location	Surface	Opponent	Score	Result
1977	1st Round	13–18 Jun 1977	(United Kingdom) Eastbourne	Grass	Israel	0–0	Lost

=== 1990s ===
Year	Competition	Date	Location	Surface	Opponent	Score	Result
1991	World Group Qualifying	19 Jul 1991	(United Kingdom) Nottingham	Hard	Cuba	0–3	Lost
1991	World Group, Consolation Rounds	20 Jul 1991	(United Kingdom) Nottingham	Hard	Thailand	0–3	Lost
1992	Asia/Oceania Pool A	4 May 1992	(Sri Lanka) Colombo	Clay	Malaysia	3–0	Won
1992	Asia/Oceania Pool A	5 May 1992	(Sri Lanka) Colombo	Clay	Philippines	0–3	Lost
1992	Asia/Oceania Pool A	6 May 1992	(Sri Lanka) Colombo	Clay	South Korea	0–3	Lost
1992	Asia/Oceania Zone, Knockout Stage	7 May 1992	(Greece) Athens	Clay	Chinese Taipei	0–3	Lost
1994	Asia/Oceania Pool A	2 May 1994	(India) New Delhi	Clay	Chinese Taipei	1–2	Lost
1994	Asia/Oceania Pool A	3 May 1994	(India) New Delhi	Clay	Philippines	1–2	Lost
1994	Asia/Oceania Pool A	4 May 1994	(India) New Delhi	Clay	Syria	3–0	Won
1995	Asia/Oceania Group II	4 May 1995	(India) Mumbai	Clay	Malaysia	2–1	Won
1995	Asia/Oceania Group II	5 May 1995	(India) Mumbai	Clay	Sri Lanka	2–1	Won
1995	Asia/Oceania Group II	6 May 1995	(India) Mumbai	Clay	Pacific Oceania	3–0	Won
1995	Asia/Oceania Zone, play-offs	7 May 1995	(India) Mumbai	Clay	Singapore	3–0	Won
1996	Asia/Oceania Group I	20–22 Feb 1996	(Thailand) Chiang Mai	Hard	Malaysia	3–0	Won
1996	Asia/Oceania Group I	22 Feb 1996	(Thailand) Chiang Mai	Hard	South Korea	0–3	Lost
1996	Asia/Oceania Group I	22 Feb 1996	(Thailand) Chiang Mai	Hard	Hong Kong	2–1	Won
1996	Asia/Oceania Zone, play-offs	23 Feb 1996	(Thailand) Chiang Mai	Hard	China	0–3	Lost
1997	Asia/Oceania Group I	11 Mar 1997	(New Zealand) Wellington	Hard	Chinese Taipei	0–3	Lost
1997	Asia/Oceania Group I	12 Mar 1997	(New Zealand) Wellington	Hard	Indonesia	0–3	Lost
1997	Asia/Oceania Group I	13 Mar 1997	(New Zealand) Wellington	Hard	New Zealand	1–2	Lost
1997	Asia/Oceania Zone, play-offs	14 Mar 1997	(New Zealand) Wellington	Hard	Thailand	1–2	Lost
1997	Asia/Oceania Zone, play-offs	15 Mar 1997	(New Zealand) Wellington	Hard	Kazakhstan	0–0	Won
1998	Asia/Oceania Group II	16 Feb 1998	(Thailand) Samutpakam	Hard	Pakistan	3–0	Won
1998	Asia/Oceania Group II	17 Feb 1998	(Thailand) Samutpakam	Hard	Iraq	3–0	Won
1998	Asia/Oceania Group II	19 Feb 1998	(Thailand) Samutpakam	Hard	Tajikistan	2–1	Won
1998	Asia/Oceania Group II	20 Feb 1998	(Thailand) Samutpakam	Hard	Pacific Oceania	2–0	Won
1999	Asia/Oceania Group I	22 Feb 1999	(Thailand) Samutpakam	Hard	Uzbekistan	2–1	Won
1999	Asia/Oceania Group I	23 Feb 1999	(Thailand) Samutpakam	Hard	Chinese Taipei	0–3	Lost
1999	Asia/Oceania Group I	25 Feb 1999	(Thailand) Samutpakam	Hard	Indonesia	3–0	Won
1999	Asia/Oceania Group I	26 Feb 1999	(Thailand) Samutpakam	Hard	Thailand	2–1	Won

=== 2000s ===
Year	Competition	Date	Location	Surface	Opponent	Score	Result
2000	Asia/Oceania Group I	25 Apr 2000	(Japan) Osaka	Hard	Thailand	2–1	Won
2000	Asia/Oceania Group I	26 Apr 2000	(Japan) Osaka	Hard	Japan	0–2	Lost
2000	Asia/Oceania Group I	27 Apr 2000	(Japan) Osaka	Hard	Kazakhstan	3–0	Won
2000	Asia/Oceania Group I	29 Apr 2000	(Japan) Osaka	Hard	Hong Kong	3–0	Won
2001	Asia/Oceania Group I	10 Apr 2001	(Chinese Taipei) Kaohsiung	Hard	Pacific Oceania	3–0	Won
2001	Asia/Oceania Group I	11 Apr 2001	(Chinese Taipei) Kaohsiung	Hard	New Zealand	1–2	Lost
2001	Asia/Oceania Group I	12 Apr 2001	(Chinese Taipei) Kaohsiung	Hard	Indonesia	0–3	Lost
2001	Asia/Oceania Group I	13 Apr 2001	(Chinese Taipei) Kaohsiung	Hard	South Korea	2–1	Won
2002	Asia/Oceania Group I	4 Mar 2002	(China) Guangzhou	Hard	Chinese Taipei	0–3	Lost
2002	Asia/Oceania Group I	5 Mar 2002	(China) Guangzhou	Hard	New Zealand	1–2	Lost
2002	Asia/Oceania Group I	6 Mar 2002	(China) Guangzhou	Hard	South Korea	0–3	Lost
2002	Asia/Oceania Group I	8 Mar 2002	(China) Guangzhou	Hard	Indonesia	0–3	Lost
2003	Asia/Oceania Group II	21 Apr 2003	(Japan) Tokyo	Hard	Philippines	3–0	Won
2003	Asia/Oceania Group II	22 Apr 2003	(Japan) Tokyo	Hard	Kyrgyzstan	3–0	Won
2003	Asia/Oceania Group II	23 Apr 2003	(Japan) Tokyo	Hard	Pacific Oceania	2–0	Won
2004	Asia/Oceania Group I	19 Apr 2004	(India) New Delhi	Hard	Chinese Taipei	3–0	Won
2004	Asia/Oceania Group I	20 Apr 2004	(India) New Delhi	Hard	South Korea	2–1	Won
2004	Asia/Oceania Group I	22 Apr 2004	(India) New Delhi	Hard	Indonesia	1–2	Lost
2004	Asia/Oceania Group I	23 Apr 2004	(India) New Delhi	Hard	Uzbekistan	2–1	Won
2004	Asia/Oceania Group I, Play-offs	24 Apr 2004	(India) New Delhi	Hard	Thailand	0–2	Lost
2005	Asia/Oceania Group I	20 Apr 2005	(India) New Delhi	Hard	Singapore	3–0	Won
2005	Asia/Oceania Group I	21 Apr 2005	(India) New Delhi	Hard	Kazakhstan	3–0	Won
2005	Asia/Oceania Group I	22 Apr 2005	(India) New Delhi	Hard	China	0–3	Lost
2005	Asia/Oceania Group I, Play-offs	23 Apr 2005	(India) New Delhi	Hard	South Korea	2–1	Won
2006	Asia/Oceania Group I	20 Apr 2006	(South Korea) Seoul	Hard	Philippines	2–0	Won
2006	Asia/Oceania Group I	20 Apr 2006	(South Korea) Seoul	Hard	Chinese Taipei	2–0	Won
2006	Asia/Oceania Group I	21 Apr 2006	(South Korea) Seoul	Hard	New Zealand	2–1	Won
2006	Asia/Oceania Group I, Play-offs	22 Apr 2006	(South Korea) Seoul	Hard	Australia	1–2	Lost
2007	Asia/Oceania Group I	16 Apr 2007	(New Zealand) Christchurch	Hard	Kazakhstan	3–0	Won
2007	Asia/Oceania Group I	17 Apr 2007	(New Zealand) Christchurch	Hard	Jordan	3–0	Won
2007	Asia/Oceania Group I	18 Apr 2007	(New Zealand) Christchurch	Hard	New Zealand	2–1	Won
2007	Asia/Oceania Group I	20 Apr 2007	(New Zealand) Christchurch	Hard	Chinese Taipei	0–3	Lost
2007	Asia/Oceania Group I, Play-offs	21 Apr 2007	(New Zealand) Christchurch	Hard	Uzbekistan	0–3	Lost
2008	Asia/Oceania Group I	30 Jan 2008	(Thailand) Bangkok	Hard	Indonesia	1–2	Lost
2008	Asia/Oceania Group I	31 Jan 2008	(Thailand) Bangkok	Hard	New Zealand	1–2	Lost
2008	Asia/Oceania Group I	1 Feb 2008	(Thailand) Bangkok	Hard	Australia	0–3	Lost
2008	Asia/Oceania Group I, Play-offs	2 Feb 2008	(Thailand) Bangkok	Hard	Hong Kong	2–1	Won
2009	Asia/Oceania Group I	4 Feb 2009	(Australia) Perth	Hard	New Zealand	0–3	Lost
2009	Asia/Oceania Group I	5 Feb 2009	(Australia) Perth	Hard	Indonesia	0–3	Lost
2009	Asia/Oceania Group I	6 Feb 2009	(Australia) Perth	Hard	Uzbekistan	0–3	Lost
2009	Asia/Oceania Group I, Play-offs	7 Feb 2009	(Australia) Perth	Hard	Chinese Taipei	0–3	Lost

=== 2010s ===
Year	Competition	Date	Location	Surface	Opponent	Score	Result
2010	Asia/Oceania Group II	4 Feb 2010	(Malaysia) Kuala Lumpur	Hard	Singapore	3–0	Won
2010	Asia/Oceania Group II	5 Feb 2010	(Malaysia) Kuala Lumpur	Hard	Malaysia	3–0	Won
2010	Asia/Oceania Group II, Play-offs	6 Feb 2010	(Malaysia) Kuala Lumpur	Hard	Kyrgyzstan	3–0	Won
2011	Asia/Oceania Group I	2 Feb 2011	(Thailand) Nonthaburi	Hard	China	1–2	Lost
2011	Asia/Oceania Group I	3 Feb 2011	(Thailand) Nonthaburi	Hard	Uzbekistan	1–2	Lost
2011	Asia/Oceania Group I	4 Feb 2011	(Thailand) Nonthaburi	Hard	Thailand	1–2	Lost
2011	Asia/Oceania Group I, Play-offs	5 Feb 2011	(Thailand) Nonthaburi	Hard	Chinese Taipei	1–2	Lost
2012	Asia/Oceania Group II	30 Jan 2012	(China) Shenzhen	Hard	Iran	3–0	Won
2012	Asia/Oceania Group II	31 Jan 2012	(China) Shenzhen	Hard	Oman	3–0	Won
2012	Asia/Oceania Group II	1 Feb 2012	(China) Shenzhen	Hard	Turkey	3–0	Won
2012	Asia/Oceania Group II	3 Feb 2012	(China) Shenzhen	Hard	Philippines	2–1	Won
2012	Asia/Oceania Group II, Play-offs	4 Feb 2012	(China) Shenzhen	Hard	Hong Kong	2–1	Won
2013	Asia/Oceania Group I	6 Feb 2013	(Kazakhstan) Astana	Hard(i)	Kazakhstan	0–3	Lost
2013	Asia/Oceania Group I	8 Feb 2013	(Kazakhstan) Astana	Hard(i)	Thailand	0–3	Lost
2013	Asia/Oceania Group I, Play-offs	9 Feb 2013	(Kazakhstan) Astana	Hard(i)	South Korea	0–3	Lost
2014	Asia/Oceania Group II	4 Feb 2014	(Kazakhstan) Astana	Hard(i)	Iran	3–0	Won
2014	Asia/Oceania Group II	5 Feb 2014	(Kazakhstan) Astana	Hard(i)	Pakistan	3–0	Won
2014	Asia/Oceania Group II	6 Feb 2014	(Kazakhstan) Astana	Hard(i)	New Zealand	2–1	Won
2014	Asia/Oceania Group II, Play-offs	7 Feb 2014	(Kazakhstan) Astana	Hard(i)	Hong Kong	1–2	Lost
2015	Asia/Oceania Group II	15 Apr 2015	(India) Hyderabad	Hard(i)	Pakistan	3–0	Won
2015	Asia/Oceania Group II	16 Apr 2015	(India) Hyderabad	Hard(i)	Malaysia	3–0	Won
2015	Asia/Oceania Group II, Play-offs	17 Apr 2015	(India) Hyderabad	Hard(i)	Turkmenistan	2–0	Won
2015	Asia/Oceania Group II, Play-offs	18 Apr 2015	(India) Hyderabad	Hard(i)	Philippines	2–1	Won
2016	Asia/Oceania Group I	3 Feb 2016	(Thailand) Hua Hin	Hard	Thailand	0–3	Lost
2016	Asia/Oceania Group I	4 Feb 2016	(Thailand) Hua Hin	Hard	Japan	1–2	Lost
2016	Asia/Oceania Group I	5 Feb 2016	(Thailand) Hua Hin	Hard	Uzbekistan	3–0	Won
2016	Asia/Oceania Group I, Play-offs	6 Feb 2016	(Thailand) Hua Hin	Hard	Kazakhstan	3–0	Won
2017	Asia/Oceania Group I	8 Feb 2017	(Kazakhstan) Astana	Hard(i)	Philippines	2–1	Won
2017	Asia/Oceania Group I	9 Feb 2017	(Kazakhstan) Astana	Hard(i)	Japan	0–3	Lost
2017	Asia/Oceania Group I	10 Feb 2017	(Kazakhstan) Astana	Hard(i)	China	0–3	Lost
2018	Asia/Oceania Group I	7 Feb 2018	(India) New Delhi	Hard	China	1–2	Lost
2018	Asia/Oceania Group I	8 Feb 2018	(India) New Delhi	Hard	Kazakhstan	1–2	Lost
2018	Asia/Oceania Group I	9 Feb 2018	(India) New Delhi	Hard	Hong Kong	3–0	Won
2018	Asia/Oceania Group I, Play-offs	10 Feb 2018	(India) New Delhi	Hard	Chinese Taipei	2–0	Won
2019	Asia/Oceania Group I	7 Feb 2019	(Kazakhstan) Astana	Hard(i)	Thailand	2–1	Won
2019	Asia/Oceania Group I	8 Feb 2019	(Kazakhstan) Astana	Hard(i)	Kazakhstan	0–3	Lost
2019	Asia/Oceania Group I, Play-offs	9 Feb 2019	(Kazakhstan) Astana	Hard(i)	South Korea	1–2	Lost

=== 2020s ===
Year	Competition	Date	Location	Surface	Opponent	Score	Result
2020–21	Asia/Oceania Group I	3 Mar 2020	(United Arab Emirates) Dubai	Hard	China	0–3	Lost
2020–21	Asia/Oceania Group I	4 Mar 2020	(United Arab Emirates) Dubai	Hard	Uzbekistan	3–0	Won
2020–21	Asia/Oceania Group I	5 Mar 2020	(United Arab Emirates) Dubai	Hard	South Korea	2–1	Won
2020–21	Asia/Oceania Group I	6 Mar 2020	(United Arab Emirates) Dubai	Hard	Chinese Taipei	2–1	Won
2020–21	Asia/Oceania Group I	7 Mar 2020	(United Arab Emirates) Dubai	Hard	Indonesia	2–1	Won
2020–21	Play-offs	16 Apr 2021	(Latvia) Jūrmala	Hard (i)	Latvia	1–3	Lost
2022	Asia/Oceania Group I	12 Apr 2022	(Turkey) Antalya	Clay	Japan	0–3	Lost
2022	Asia/Oceania Group I	13 Apr 2022	(Turkey) Antalya	Clay	China	0–3	Lost
2022	Asia/Oceania Group I	14 Apr 2022	(Turkey) Antalya	Clay	Indonesia	2–1	Won
2022	Asia/Oceania Group I	15 Apr 2022	(Turkey) Antalya	Clay	New Zealand	2–1	Won
2022	Asia/Oceania Group I	16 Apr 2022	(Turkey) Antalya	Clay	South Korea	2–1	Won
2023	Asia/Oceania Group I	11 Apr 2023	(Uzbekistan) Tashkent	Hard	Thailand	2–1	Won
2023	Asia/Oceania Group I	12 Apr 2023	(Uzbekistan) Tashkent	Hard	Uzbekistan	3–0	Won
2023	Asia/Oceania Group I	13 Apr 2023	(Uzbekistan) Tashkent	Hard	South Korea	1–2	Lost
2023	Asia/Oceania Group I	14 Apr 2023	(Uzbekistan) Tashkent	Hard	China	0–3	Lost
2023	Asia/Oceania Group I	15 Apr 2023	(Uzbekistan) Tashkent	Hard	Japan	0–3	Lost
2024	Asia/Oceania Group I	9 Apr 2024	(China) Changsha	Hard	Pacific Oceania	3–0	Won
2024	Asia/Oceania Group I	10 Apr 2024	(China) Changsha	Hard	China	0–3	Lost
2024	Asia/Oceania Group I	11 Apr 2024	(China) Changsha	Hard	Chinese Taipei	2–1	Won
2024	Asia/Oceania Group I	12 Apr 2024	(China) Changsha	Hard	South Korea	2–1	Won
2024	Asia/Oceania Group I	13 Apr 2024	(China) Changsha	Hard	New Zealand	1–2	Lost
2025	Asia/Oceania Group I	8 Apr 2025	(India) Pune	Hard	New Zealand	1–2	Lost
2025	Asia/Oceania Group I	9 Apr 2025	(India) Pune	Hard	Thailand	2–1	Won
2025	Asia/Oceania Group I	10 Apr 2025	(India) Pune	Hard	Hong Kong	2–1	Won
2025	Asia/Oceania Group I	11 Apr 2025	(India) Pune	Hard	Chinese Taipei	2–1	Won
2025	Asia/Oceania Group I	12 Apr 2025	(India) Pune	Hard	South Korea	2–1	Won
2025	Play-offs	15 Nov 2025	(India) Bengaluru	Hard	Slovenia	1–2	Lost
2025	Play-offs	16 Nov 2025	(India) Bengaluru	Hard	Netherlands	0–3	Lost
2026	Asia/Oceania Group I	7 Apr 2026	(India) New Delhi	Hard	(New Zealand) Thailand	1–2	Lost
2026	Asia/Oceania Group I	8 Apr 2026	(India) New Delhi	Hard	(Thailand) New Zealand	3–0	Won
2026	Asia/Oceania Group I	9 Apr 2026	(India) New Delhi	Hard	Indonesia	0–3	Lost
2026	Asia/Oceania Group I	10 Apr 2026	(India) New Delhi	Hard	Mongolia	3–0	Won
2026	Asia/Oceania Group I	11 Apr 2026	(India) New Delhi	Hard	South Korea	2–1	Won

== See also ==
- Billie Jean King Cup
- India Davis Cup team
- India at the Hopman Cup
