= Japan Tennis Association =

- Sport: Tennis
- Abbreviation: (JTA)
- Founded: 1922
- Affiliation: International Tennis Federation
- Affiliation date: March 12, 1923
- Regional affiliation: Asian Tennis Federation
- Headquarters: National Federations
- Location: 1-1-1 Jinnan, Shibuya-ku 150-8050 Tokyo
- President: Suzuki Hiroshi
- Chairman: Morita Masaaki
- CEO: Watanabe Yasuzi

Official website
- jta-tennis.or.jp
- (Japan)

Japan Tennis Association (JTA; Japanese: 日本テニス協会) is the governing body for professional and amateur tennis in Japan. Founded in 1922 and recognized by International Lawn Tennis Federation (now International Tennis Federation) in 1923, it is one of the oldest organized sport organizations in Asia.

Japan Tennis Association operates all of the Japanese national representative tennis sides, including the Japan Davis Cup team, the Japan Fed Cup team, the Japan Hopman Cup team and youth sides as well. JTA is also responsible for organizing and hosting tennis tournaments within Japan and scheduling the home international fixtures.

== History ==
Japan Tennis Association was established as a voluntary organization in the year 1922 as Japanese Tennis Association. In 1980, it was renamed to Japan Tennis Association . In 1923, International Lawn Tennis Federation (the then international governing body of tennis) recognized the Japanese Tennis Association. The United States Lawn Tennis Association (now United States Tennis Association) played a major role in the formation of JTA, Julian Myrick the then president of the USTA and tennis promoter backed the membership of Japanese Tennis Association in the International Lawn Tennis Federation.

== Affiliate Members ==
Japan Tennis Association serve as national affiliation body of tennis in Japan, it affiliates the following tennis governing bodies in Japan.

- Hokkaidou Tennis Association
- Hokushinetsu Tennis Association
- Toukai Tennis Association
- Tyuugoku Tennis Association
- Kyuusyuu Tennis Association
- Kita Azuma Tennis Association
- Kantou Tennis Association
- Kansai Tennis Association
- Shikoku Tennis Association
