= 2004 Fed Cup =

2004 edition of the Fed Cup

Details
- Duration: 24 April – 28 November
- Edition: 42nd

Achievements (singles)

The 2004 Fed Cup was the 42nd edition of the most important competition between national teams in women's tennis.

The final was held at the Ice Palace Krylatskoye in Moscow, Russia, on 27–28 November. The home team Russia defeated the defending champion France to win their first title after five final appearances.

== World Group ==
Participating teams
| Argentina | Australia | Austria | Belgium |
| Croatia | Czech Republic | France | Germany |
| Japan | Italy | Russia | Slovakia |
| Slovenia | Spain | Switzerland | United States |

=== Draw ===
First round 24–25 April
Amiens, France (Indoor clay)
1 | France | 5
Germany | 0
Lecce, Italy (Outdoor clay)
Czech Republic | 1
7 | Italy | 3
Los Belones, Murcia, Spain (Outdoor clay)
6 | Spain | 3
Switzerland | 2
Bree, Belgium (Indoor clay)
Croatia | 2
3 | Belgium | 3
Moscow, Russia (Indoor carpet)
4 | Russia | 4
Australia | 1
Buenos Aires, Argentina (Outdoor clay)
Argentina | 4
8 | Japan | 1
Sankt Pölten, Austria (Outdoor clay)
5 | Slovakia | 2
Austria | 3
Portorož, Slovenia (Outdoor clay)
Slovenia | 1
2 | United States | 4

Quarterfinals; 10–11 July
Rimini, Italy (Outdoor clay)
1 | France | 3
7 | Italy | 2
Jerez, Spain (Outdoor clay)
5 | Spain | 3
3 | Belgium | 2
Buenos Aires, Argentina (Outdoor clay)
4 | Russia | 4
Argentina | 1
Innsbruck, Austria (Outdoor hard)
Austria | 4
2 | United States | 1

Semifinals; 24–25 November
Moscow, Russia (Indoor carpet)
1 | France | 5
5 | Spain | 0
Moscow, Russia (Indoor carpet)
4 | Russia | 5
Austria | 0

Final; 27–28 November
Moscow, Russia (Indoor carpet)
1 | France | 2
4 | Russia | 3

== World Group play-offs ==
Date: 10–11 July

The eight losing teams in the World Group first round ties and eight winners of the Zonal Group I sections competed in the World Group play-offs for spots in the 2005 World Group II.

| Venue | Surface | Home team | Score | Visiting team |
|---|---|---|---|---|
| Bang Kapi, Thailand | Indoor hard | Thailand | 3–2 | Australia |
| São Paulo, Brazil | Outdoor clay | Brazil | 1–4 | Croatia |
| Tallinn, Estonia | Outdoor clay | Estonia | 2–3 | Czech Republic |
| Illichivsk, Ukraine | Outdoor clay | Ukraine | 2–3 | Germany |
| Plovdiv, Bulgaria | Outdoor clay | Bulgaria | 2–3 | Japan |
| Bratislava, Slovakia | Outdoor clay | Slovakia | 4–0 | Belarus |
| Jakarta, Indonesia | Outdoor hard | Indonesia | 4–1 | Slovenia |
| Dorval, Canada | Outdoor clay | Canada | 2–3 | Switzerland |

== Americas Zone ==
- Nations in **bold** advanced to the higher level of competition.
- Nations in italics were relegated down to a lower level of competition.

=== Group I ===
Venue: Porto Seguro, Bahia, Brazil (outdoor clay)

Dates: 19–24 April

Participating teams

- **Brazil**
- **Canada**
- Chile
- Colombia
- Cuba
- El Salvador
- Mexico
- Puerto Rico
- Uruguay

=== Group II ===
Venue: Porto Seguro, Bahia, Brazil (outdoor clay)

Dates: 19–24 April

Participating teams

- **Bolivia**
- Dominican Republic
- Ecuador
- Guatemala
- Jamaica
- **Paraguay**
- Venezuela

== Asia/Oceania Zone ==
- Nations in **bold** advanced to the higher level of competition.
- Nations in italics were relegated down to a lower level of competition.

=== Group I ===
Venue: New Delhi, India (outdoor hard)

Dates: 19–24 April

Participating teams

- China
- Chinese Taipei
- India
- **Indonesia**
- New Zealand
- Philippines
- South Korea
- **Thailand**
- Uzbekistan

=== Group II ===
Venue: New Delhi, India (outdoor hard)

Dates: 19–24 April

Participating teams

- **Kazakhstan**
- Pacific Oceania
- **Singapore**
- Syria
- Turkmenistan

== Europe/Africa Zone ==
=== Group I ===
Venue: Athens, Greece (outdoor clay)

Dates: 19–24 April

Participating teams

- **Belarus**
- **Bulgaria**
- Denmark
- **Estonia**
- Greece
- Israel
- Hungary
- Lithuania
- Netherlands
- Poland
- Serbia and Montenegro
- South Africa
- Sweden
- **Ukraine**

=== Group II ===
Venue: Marsa, Malta (outdoor hard)

Dates: 26 April – 1 May

Participating teams

- Egypt
- Finland
- Georgia
- **Great Britain**
- Ireland
- Latvia
- **Luxembourg**
- Romania
- Turkey

=== Group III ===
Venue: Marsa, Malta (outdoor hard)

Dates: 26 April – 1 May

Participating teams

- Algeria
- Bosnia and Herzegovina
- Botswana
- Kenya
- Malta
- Namibia
- **Norway**
- **Tunisia**

== Rankings ==
The rankings were measured after the three points during the year that play took place, and were collated by combining points earned from the previous four years.

26 April
| Rank | Nation | Points | Move |
|---|---|---|---|
| 1 | France | 27,265.0 | Steady |
| 2 | United States | 18,255.0 | ▲2 |
| 3 | Belgium | 17,412.5 | Steady |
| 4 | Spain | 16,675.0 | ▲1 |
| 5 | Slovakia | 16,487.5 | ▼3 |
| 6 | Russia | 14,075.0 | Steady |
| 7 | Italy | 8,050.0 | Steady |
| 8 | Austria | 7,780.0 | Steady |
| 9 | Argentina | 6,825.0 | Steady |
| 10 | Germany | 3,600.0 | Steady |

12 July
| Rank | Nation | Points | Move |
|---|---|---|---|
| 1 | France | 29,870.0 | Steady |
| 2 | Spain | 19,855.0 | ▲2 |
| 3 | United States | 16,967.5 | ▼1 |
| 4 | Slovakia | 16,567.5 | ▲1 |
| 5 | Russia | 16,437.5 | ▲1 |
| 6 | Belgium | 16,362.5 | ▼3 |
| 7 | Austria | 10,435.0 | ▲1 |
| 8 | Italy | 7,050.0 | ▼1 |
| 9 | Argentina | 5,800.0 | Steady |
| 10 | Germany | 4,425.0 | Steady |

29 November
| Rank | Nation | Points | Move |
|---|---|---|---|
| 1 | France | 30,960.0 | Steady |
| 2 | Russia | 28,537.5 | ▲3 |
| 3 | Spain | 15,355.0 | ▼1 |
| 4 | Slovakia | 13,067.5 | Steady |
| 5 | Belgium | 12,112.5 | ▲1 |
| 6 | United States | 11,922.5 | ▼3 |
| 7 | Austria | 10,435.0 | Steady |
| 8 | Italy | 7,050.0 | Steady |
| 9 | Argentina | 5,050.0 | Steady |
| 10 | Indonesia | 3,869.5 | ▲2 |
