= Yang Shujing =

Chinese tennis player

- Country (sports): China
- Born: 5 October 1984 (age 41)
- Prize money: $17,852

Singles
- Career record: 36–36
- Career titles: 0
- Highest ranking: No. 462 (8 November 2004)

Doubles
- Career record: 51–25
- Career titles: 6 ITF
- Highest ranking: No. 154 (1 November 2004)

Team competitions
- Fed Cup: 4–2

Yang Shujing (born 5 October 1984) is a former professional tennis player from China.

== Tennis career ==
Shujing played four Fed Cup ties for China and won four of her six matches, two each in singles and doubles, all in the 2004 Fed Cup competition.

On the professional tour, she had a top ranking of 462 in singles and 154 in doubles. She won six ITF doubles titles and was runner-up in the doubles at the Guangzhou International Open in 2004, on her WTA Tour main-draw debut. Teaming up with Yu Ying, the pair beat top seeds Nicole Pratt and Tamarine Tanasugarn en route to the final, which they lost to another Chinese combination, Li Ting and Sun Tiantian.

== WTA Tour finals ==
=== Doubles: 1 (runner-up) ===
Result	W/L	Date	Tournament	Tier	Surface	Partner	Opponents	Score
Loss	0–1	Oct 2004	Guangzhou International Open, China	Tier III	Hard	(China) Yu Ying	(China) Li Ting (China) Sun Tiantian	4–6, 1–6

== ITF Circuit finals ==
=== Doubles (6–3) ===
Legend
$25,000 tournaments
$10,000 tournaments

Result	No.	Date	Tournament	Surface	Partner	Opponents	Score
Win	1.	4 August 2002	ITF Tongliao, China	Hard	(China) Yu Ying	(China) Dong Yanhua (China) Yue Qing	6–1, 6–3
Win	2.	2 November 2003	ITF Beijing, China	Hard	(China) Yu Ying	(South Korea) Jeon Mi-ra (Japan) Seiko Okamoto	6–4, 6–2
Loss	1.	9 November 2003	ITF Taizhou, China	Hard	(China) Yu Ying	(China) Peng Shuai (China) Xie Yanze	3–6, 6–4, 2–6
Win	3.	3 April 2004	ITF Mumbai, India	Hard	(China) Yu Ying	(China) Hao Jie (China) Dong Yanhua	6–2, 6–2
Win	4.	11 April 2004	ITF New Delhi, India	Hard	(China) Yu Ying	(Chinese Taipei) Chuang Chia-jung (Malaysia) Khoo Chin-bee	7–6, 2–1 ret.
Win	5.	19 September 2004	ITF Beijing, China	Hard	(China) Yu Ying	(China) Li Shanshan (China) Zheng Jie	6–4, 6–3
Loss	2.	27 February 2005	ITF Melilla, Spain	Hard	(China) Sun Shengnan	(Italy) Sara Errani (Spain) María José Martínez Sánchez	7–6^{(2)}, 0–6, 5–7
Win	6.	12 April 2005	ITF Changsha, China	Hard	(China) Yu Ying	(Indonesia) Ayu Fani Damayanti (Indonesia) Septi Mende	6–1, 6–7^{(5)}, 6–2
Loss	3.	13 February 2006	ITF Shenzhen, China	Hard	(China) Hao Jie	(China) Liang Chen (China) Song Shanshan	5–7, 1–6

== See also ==
- List of China Fed Cup team representatives
