= 2004 Fed Cup World Group play-offs =

Part of tennis tournament

The 2004 World Group play-offs decided which nations featured in World Group in the 2005 Fed Cup. The play-off winners went on to feature in World Group in 2005, while the losing nations joined Zonal Competition for 2005.

== Thailand vs. Australia ==
Thailand
3
Hua Mark Indoor Stadium, Bangkok, Thailand
10–11 July 2004
Rebound Ace (indoors)

Australia
2

			1	2	3
1	(Thailand) (Australia)	Suchanun Viratprasert; Nicole Pratt	6; 2	1; 6	6; 1
2	(Thailand) (Australia)	Tamarine Tanasugarn; Samantha Stosur	5; 7	6; 2	8; 6
3	(Thailand) (Australia)	Tamarine Tanasugarn; Nicole Pratt	1; 6	6; 4	6; 1
4	(Thailand) (Australia)	Napaporn Tongsalee; Samantha Stosur	6; 4	0; 6	0; 6
5	(Thailand) (Australia)	Montinee Tangphong / Napaporn Tongsalee; Lisa McShea / Christina Wheeler	6; 4	3; 6	5; 7

== Brazil vs. Croatia ==
Brazil
1
Clube Paineiras do Morumby, São Paulo, Brazil
10–11 July 2004
Red clay (outdoors)

Croatia
4

			1	2	3
1	(Brazil) (Croatia)	Maria Fernanda Alves; Ivana Abramović	6; 3	6; 0
2	(Brazil) (Croatia)	Bruna Colósio; Jelena Kostanić	0; 6	1; 6
3	(Brazil) (Croatia)	Maria Fernanda Alves; Jelena Kostanić	4; 6	1; 6
4	(Brazil) (Croatia)	Bruna Colósio; Darija Jurak	2; 6	7; 5	5; 7
5	(Brazil) (Croatia)	Carla Tiene / Bruna Colósio; Ivana Abramović / Ivana Lisjak	4; 6	2; 6

== Estonia vs. Czech Republic ==
Estonia
2
Kadrioru Stadium, Tallinn, Estonia
10–11 July 2004
Red clay (outdoors)

Czech Republic
3

			1	2	3
1	(Estonia) (Czech Republic)	Margit Rüütel; Klára Koukalová	7; 5	5; 7	6; 2
2	(Estonia) (Czech Republic)	Maret Ani; Barbora Strýcová	6^{3} 7^{7}	7; 5	6; 8
3	(Estonia) (Czech Republic)	Maret Ani; Klára Koukalová	5; 7	4; 6
4	(Estonia) (Czech Republic)	Margit Rüütel; Barbora Strýcová	4; 6	4; 6
5	(Estonia) (Czech Republic)	Maret Ani / Margit Rüütel; Michaela Paštiková / Lucie Šafářová	6; 2	6; 4

== Ukraine vs. Germany ==
Ukraine
2
Elite Tennis Club, Illichivsk, Ukraine
10–11 July 2004
Red clay (indoors)

Germany
3

			1	2	3
1	(Ukraine) (Germany)	Tatiana Perebiynis; Barbara Rittner	7; 5	2; 6	4; 6
2	(Ukraine) (Germany)	Yuliana Fedak; Anna-Lena Grönefeld	2; 6	6; 2	6; 2
3	(Ukraine) (Germany)	Tatiana Perebiynis; Anna-Lena Grönefeld	4; 6	6; 4	11; 9
4	(Ukraine) (Germany)	Yuliana Fedak; Barbara Rittner	3; 6	6; 4	4; 6
5	(Ukraine) (Germany)	Yuliana Fedak / Tatiana Perebiynis; Barbara Rittner / Jasmin Wöhr	6; 3	4; 6	3; 6

== Bulgaria vs. Japan ==
Bulgaria
2
TC Locomotiv, Plovdiv, Bulgaria
10–11 July 2004
Red clay (outdoors)

Japan
3

			1	2	3
1	(Bulgaria) (Japan)	Tsvetana Pironkova; Shinobu Asagoe	6^{6} 7^{8}	6; 3	4; 6
2	(Bulgaria) (Japan)	Desislava Topalova; Saori Obata	7; 5	3; 0		retired
3	(Bulgaria) (Japan)	Desislava Topalova; Shinobu Asagoe	1; 6	7^{7} 6^{3}	4; 6
4	(Bulgaria) (Japan)	Tsvetana Pironkova; Yuka Yoshida	6; 1	6; 3
5	(Bulgaria) (Japan)	Maria Geznenge / Svetlana Krivencheva; Shinobu Asagoe / Rika Fujiwara	3; 6	2; 6

== Slovakia vs. Belarus ==
Slovakia
4
TK Slavia STU Agrofert, Bratislava, Slovakia
10–11 July 2004
Clay (outdoors)

Belarus
0

			1	2	3
1	(Slovakia) (Belarus)	Ľubomíra Kurhajcová; Tatsiana Uvarova	6; 2	6; 1
2	(Slovakia) (Belarus)	Martina Suchá; Anastasiya Yakimova	6; 0	6; 2
3	(Slovakia) (Belarus)	Ľubomíra Kurhajcová; Tatiana Poutchek	6; 0	6; 1
4	(Slovakia) (Belarus)	Henrieta Nagyová; Darya Kustova	6; 1	7; 5
5	(Slovakia) (Belarus)	Ľubomíra Kurhajcová / Martina Suchá; Darya Kustova / Tatiana Poutchek				not played

== Indonesia vs. Slovenia ==
Indonesia
4
Gelora Bung Karno Tennis Stadium, Jakarta, Indonesia
10–11 July 2004
Hard (outdoors)

Slovenia
1

			1	2	3
1	(Indonesia) (Slovenia)	Angelique Widjaja; Katarina Srebotnik	6; 4	6; 3
2	(Indonesia) (Slovenia)	Wynne Prakusya; Tina Pisnik	6; 1	6; 4
3	(Indonesia) (Slovenia)	Angelique Widjaja; Tina Pisnik	6; 4	5; 7	6; 1
4	(Indonesia) (Slovenia)	Liza Andriyani; Andreja Klepač	6^{2} 7^{7}	2; 6
5	(Indonesia) (Slovenia)	Wynne Prakusya / Angelique Widjaja; Andreja Klepač / Tina Križan	6; 2	6; 2

== Canada vs. Switzerland ==
Canada
2
Dorval Tennis Club, Dorval, Canada
10–11 July 2004
Clay (outdoors)

Switzerland
3

			1	2	3
1	(Canada) (Switzerland)	Stéphanie Dubois; Myriam Casanova	0; 6	3; 6
2	(Canada) (Switzerland)	Marie-Ève Pelletier; Timea Bacsinszky	3; 6	4; 6
3	(Canada) (Switzerland)	Marie-Ève Pelletier; Myriam Casanova	2; 6	3; 6
4	(Canada) (Switzerland)	Aleksandra Wozniak; Timea Bacsinszky	6; 0	6; 4
5	(Canada) (Switzerland)	Mélanie Marois / Marie-Ève Pelletier; Timea Bacsinszky / Martina Lautenschläger	7^{8} 6^{6}	7^{10} 6^{8}

== See also ==
- Fed Cup structure
