= China Billie Jean King Cup team =

Chinese national women's tennis team

China
- Other names: People's Republic of China
- Captain: Yang Wei-Guang
- ITF ranking: 20 ▲2 (19 April 2022)
- Colors: red & white
- First year: 1981
- Years played: 41
- Ties played (W–L): 156 (99–56)
- Years in World Group: 20 (8–18)
- Best finish: World Group SF (2008)
- Most total wins: Li Na (35–10)
- Most singles wins: Li Na (27–4)
- Most doubles wins: Li Ting (12–6)
- Best doubles team: Yi Jingqian / Li Li (5–1); Li Ting / Sun Tiantian (5–1)
- Most ties played: Li Na (31)
- Most years played: Peng Shuai (9)

The China women's national tennis team represents China (officially the People's Republic of China) in Billie Jean King Cup tennis competition and is governed by the Chinese Tennis Association.

== History ==
China competed in its first Fed Cup in 1981.

China competed at the World Group level in 2007 through 2009.

China enjoyed their best Billie Jean King Cup performance in 2008 when they reached the semi-finals.

== Current team (2022) ==
- Zhu Lin
- Wang Qiang
- Yuan Yue
- Zheng Qinwen
- Wang Xinyu

== Recent results ==
Year	Competition	Date	Location	Opponent	Score	Result
2015	Group I, Asia/Oceania, Group B Round Robin, 1st Round	4 February	Guangdong Olympic Tennis Centre, Guangzhou, China	Kazakhstan	1-2	Loss
2015	Group I, Asia/Oceania, Group B Round Robin, 1st Round	5 February	Guangzhou, China	Thailand	2-1	Won
2015	Group I, Asia/Oceania, Group B Round Robin, 1st Round	6 February	Guangzhou, China	Chinese Taipei	2-1	Won
2015	Group I, Asia/Oceania, 3rd/4th Play-off	7 February	Guangzhou, China	South Korea	1-2	Loss
2016	Group I, Asia/Oceania, Group B Round Robin, 1st Round	3 February	Hua Hin Centennial Sports Club, Hua Hin, Thailand	Chinese Taipei	1-2	Loss
2016	Group I, Asia/Oceania, Group B Round Robin, 1st Round	4 February	Hua Hin, Thailand	South Korea	2-1	Won
2016	Group I, Asia/Oceania, Group B Round Robin, 1st Round	5 February	Hua Hin, Thailand	Kazakhstan	3-0	Won
2016	Group I, Asia/Oceania, 3rd/4th Play-off	6 February	Hua Hin, Thailand	Thailand	2-1	Won
2017	Group I, Asia/Oceania, Group B Round Robin, 1st Round	8 February	Daulet National Tennis Centre, Astana, Kazakhstan	Philippines	3-0	Won
2017	Group I, Asia/Oceania, Group B Round Robin, 1st Round	9 February	Astana, Kazakhstan	India	3-0	Won
2017	Group I, Asia/Oceania, Group B Round Robin, 1st Round	10 February	Astana, Kazakhstan	Japan	0-3	Loss
2017	Group I, Asia/Oceania, 3rd/4th Play-off	11 February	Astana, Kazakhstan	South Korea	2-0	Won
2018	Group I, Asia/Oceania, Group A Round Robin, 1st Round	7 February	R.K. Khanna Tennis Complex, New Delhi, India	India	2-1	Won
2018	Group I, Asia/Oceania, Group A Round Robin, 1st Round	8 February	New Delhi, India	Hong Kong	2-1	Won
2018	Group I, Asia/Oceania, Group A Round Robin, 1st Round	9 February	New Delhi, India	Kazakhstan	0-3	Loss
2018	Group I, Asia/Oceania, 3rd/4th Play-off	10 February	New Delhi, India	South Korea	2-0	Won
2019	Group I, Asia/Oceania, Group B Round Robin, 1st Round	6 February	Daulet National Tennis Centre, Astana, Kazakhstan	Pacific Oceania	3-0	Won
2019	Group I, Asia/Oceania, Group B Round Robin, 1st Round	7 February	Astana, Kazakhstan	South Korea	3-0	Won
2019	Group I, Asia/Oceania, Group B Round Robin, 1st Round	8 February	Astana, Kazakhstan	Indonesia	3-0	Won
2019	Group I, Asia/Oceania, Promotional Play-off Final	9 February	Astana, Kazakhstan	Kazakhstan	1-2	Loss
2020-21	Group I, Asia/Oceania, Group A Round Robin, 1st Round	3 March	Aviation Club Tennis Centre, Dubai, United Arab Emirates	India	3-0	Won
2020-21	Group I, Asia/Oceania, Group A Round Robin, 1st Round	4 March	Dubai, United Arab Emirates	Indonesia	3-0	Won
2020-21	Group I, Asia/Oceania, Group A Round Robin, 1st Round	5 March	Dubai, United Arab Emirates	Chinese Taipei	3-0	Won
2020-21	Group I, Asia/Oceania, Group A Round Robin, 1st Round	6 March	Dubai, United Arab Emirates	Uzbekistan	2-1	Won
2020-21	Group I, Asia/Oceania, Group A Round Robin, 1st Round	7 March	Dubai, United Arab Emirates	South Korea	3-0	Won
2020-21	Play Offs, Worlds, Finals, 1st Round	16-17 April	's-Hertogenbosch, Worlds, Netherlands	Netherlands	2-3	Loss
2022	Group I, Asia/Oceania, Group A Round Robin, 1st Round	12 April	Megasaray Tennis Academy, Antalya, Turkey	New Zealand	3-0	Won
2022	Group I, Asia/Oceania, Group A Round Robin, 1st Round	13 April	Antalya, Turkey	India	3-0	Won
2022	Group I, Asia/Oceania, Group A Round Robin, 1st Round	14 April	Antalya, Turkey	South Korea	2-1	Won
2022	Group I, Asia/Oceania, Group A Round Robin, 1st Round	15 April	Antalya, Turkey	Indonesia	3-0	Won
2022	Group I, Asia/Oceania, Group A Round Robin, 1st Round	16 April	Antalya, Turkey	Japan	1-2	Loss
2022	Play Offs, Worlds, Finals, 1st Round	11-12 November	Velenje, Sloevenia	Slovenia	1-3	Loss

== See also ==
- Billie Jean King Cup
- China Davis Cup team
- China at the Hopman Cup
- Tennis in China
