= Yu Ying =

Chinese tennis player

- Country (sports): China
- Born: 16 February 1982 (age 43); Hunan, China
- Plays: Right-handed (two-handed backhand)
- Prize money: $19,314

Singles
- Career record: 58–36
- Career titles: 1 ITF
- Highest ranking: No. 462 (16 September 2002)

Doubles
- Career record: 41–19
- Career titles: 5 ITF
- Highest ranking: No. 155 (1 November 2004)

Team competitions
- Fed Cup: 3–1

Yu Ying (born 16 February 1982) is a former professional tennis player from China.

== Biography ==
A right-handed player from Hunan, Yu made her WTA Tour main draw debut at the Shanghai Open in 2002. After winning her way through qualifying, she was beaten in the first round by Antonella Serra Zanetti. As a doubles player she reached a top ranking of 155 in the world and was runner-up at the Guangzhou International Women's Open in 2004, partnering Yang Shujing.

Yu played in the doubles rubber of four Fed Cup ties for China in 2004, of which she won three.

== WTA Tour career finals ==
=== Doubles (0–1) ===
Result	W/L	Date	Tournament	Tier	Surface	Partner	Opponents	Score
Loss	0–1	Oct 2004	Guangzhou, China	Tier III	Hard	(China) Yang Shujing	(China) Li Ting (China) Sun Tiantian	4–6, 1–6

== ITF finals ==
$25,000 tournaments
$10,000 tournaments

=== Singles (1–1) ===
Outcome	No.	Date	Tournament	Surface	Opponent	Score
Winner	1.	28 July 2002	Chifeng, China	Clay	(China) Liu Jingjing	6–4, 6–4
Runner-up	1.	17 April 2005	Changsha, China	Hard	(China) Xie Yanze	1–6, 1–6

=== Doubles (6–2) ===
Outcome	No.	Date	Tournament	Surface	Partner	Opponents	Score
Runner-up	1.	28 July 2002	Chifeng, China	Clay	(China) Liu Jingjing	(China) He Chunyan (China) Liu Weijuan	6–3, 2–6, 6–7
Winner	1.	4 August 2002	Tongliao, China	Hard	(China) Yang Shujing	(China) Dong Yanhua (China) Yue Qing	6–1, 6–3
Winner	2.	2 November 2003	Beijing, China	Hard	(China) Yang Shujing	(South Korea) Jeon Mi-ra (Japan) Seiko Okamoto	6–4, 6–2
Runner-up	2.	9 November 2003	Taizhou, China	Hard	(China) Yang Shujing	(China) Peng Shuai (China) Xie Yanze	3–6, 6–4, 2–6
Winner	3.	3 April 2004	Mumbai, India	Hard	(China) Yang Shujing	(China) Hao Jie (China) Dong Yanhua	6–2, 6–2
Winner	4.	11 April 2004	New Delhi, India	Hard	(China) Yang Shujing	(Chinese Taipei) Chuang Chia-jung (Malaysia) Khoo Chin-bee	7–6, 2–1 ret.
Winner	5.	19 September 2004	Beijing, China	Hard	(China) Yang Shujing	(China) Li Shanshan (China) Zheng Jie	6–4, 6–3
Winner	6.	12 April 2005	Changsha, China	Hard	(China) Yang Shujing	(Indonesia) Ayu Fani Damayanti (Indonesia) Septi Mende	6–1, 6–7^{(5)}, 6–2

== See also ==
- List of China Fed Cup team representatives
