= Wang I-ting =

Taiwanese tennis player

- Country (sports): Chinese Taipei
- Born: 21 November 1981 (age 44)
- Prize money: $24,540

Singles
- Highest ranking: No. 438 (13 Nov 2000)

Doubles
- Career titles: 1 ITF
- Highest ranking: No. 356 (27 May 2002)

Team competitions
- Fed Cup: 5–6 (doubles: 4–3)

Wang I-ting (born 21 November 1981) is a Taiwanese former professional tennis player.

Wang, who reached a career-high singles ranking of world No. 438, was a playing member of the Chinese Taipei Fed Cup team between 2001 and 2004. She featured in a total of nine ties, winning one singles and four doubles rubbers.

== ITF finals ==
=== Singles (0–1) ===
Outcome	No.	Date	Tournament	Surface	Opponent	Score
Runner-up	1.	Nov 2002	ITF Manila, Philippines	Hard	(India) Sania Mirza	6–2, 4–6, 5–7

=== Doubles (1–3) ===
Outcome	No.	Date	Tournament	Surface	Partner	Opponents	Score
Runner-up	1.	Aug 1999	ITF Harrisonburg, United States	Hard	(United States) Julie Ditty	(United States) Amanda Augustus (Australia) Amy Jensen	7–5, 3–6, 2–6
Runner-up	2.	Sep 2000	ITF New Delhi, India	Hard	(Thailand) Orawan Wongkamalasai	(India) Rushmi Chakravarthi (India) Sai Jayalakshmy Jayaram	3–6, 2–6
Winner	1.	Jun 2003	ITF Inchon, South Korea	Hard	(Japan) Maki Arai	(South Korea) Kim Ye-on (South Korea) Lee Joo-hee	6–1, 1–6, 6–2
Runner-up	3.	Nov 2003	ITF Tainan, Taiwan	Clay	(Japan) Satomi Kinjo	(Chinese Taipei) Chan Chin-wei (Chinese Taipei) Chuang Chia-jung	3–6, 1–6
