= R. K. Khanna Tennis Complex =

Tennis complex in New Delhi, India

R.K. Khanna Tennis Complex आर.के. खन्ना टेनिस अखाड़ा (Hindi)
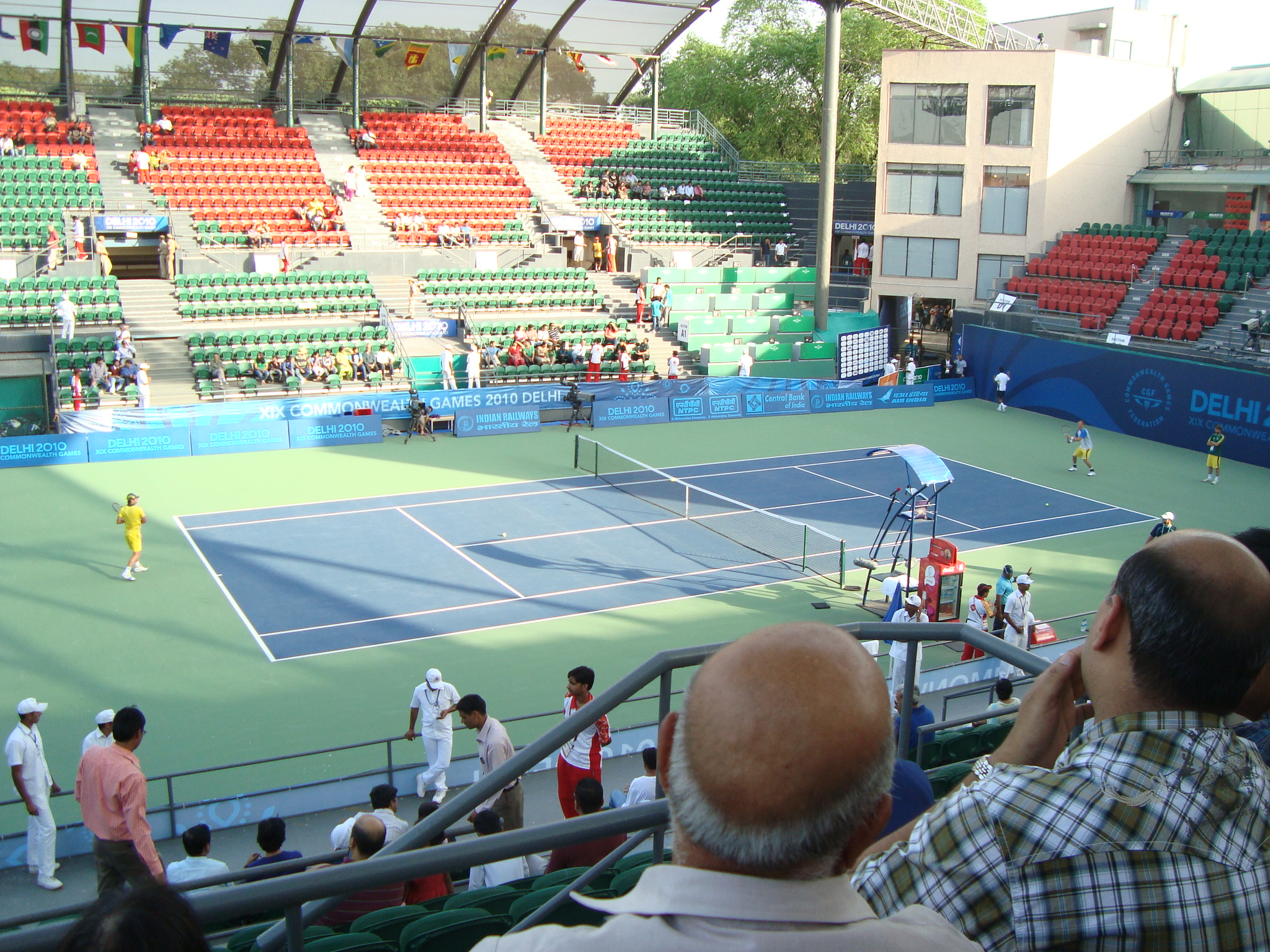
- Centre court of R K Khanna Tennis Complex
- Interactive map of R.K. Khanna Tennis Complex आर.के. खन्ना टेनिस अखाड़ा (Hindi)
- Location: Africa Avenue, Delhi; India
- Coordinates: 28°33′36″N 77°11′19″E
- Operator: Delhi Lawn Tennis Association (DLTA)
- Capacity: 5,015
- Surface: Hard / Outdoor

Construction
- Opened: 1982
- Renovated: 2009

Tenants
- Davis Cup; Delhi Open (2014 – present)

R. K. Khanna Tennis Complex is a tennis stadium in New Delhi, India. It has a centre court, six match courts and six warm-up courts. It has a capacity of 5,015.

== About ==
The stadium was opened in 1982, and was renovated in 2009.

The arena was named after Raj Kumar Khanna, a former president of the All India Tennis Association (AITA) and a former non-playing captain of the India Davis Cup team.

It was a venue for the tennis events at the 1982 Asian Games and 2010 Commonwealth Games. It is also used sometimes for India's Fed Cup and Davis Cup matches.

From 2014 it is annually hosting the Delhi Open, a ATP Challenger Tour.

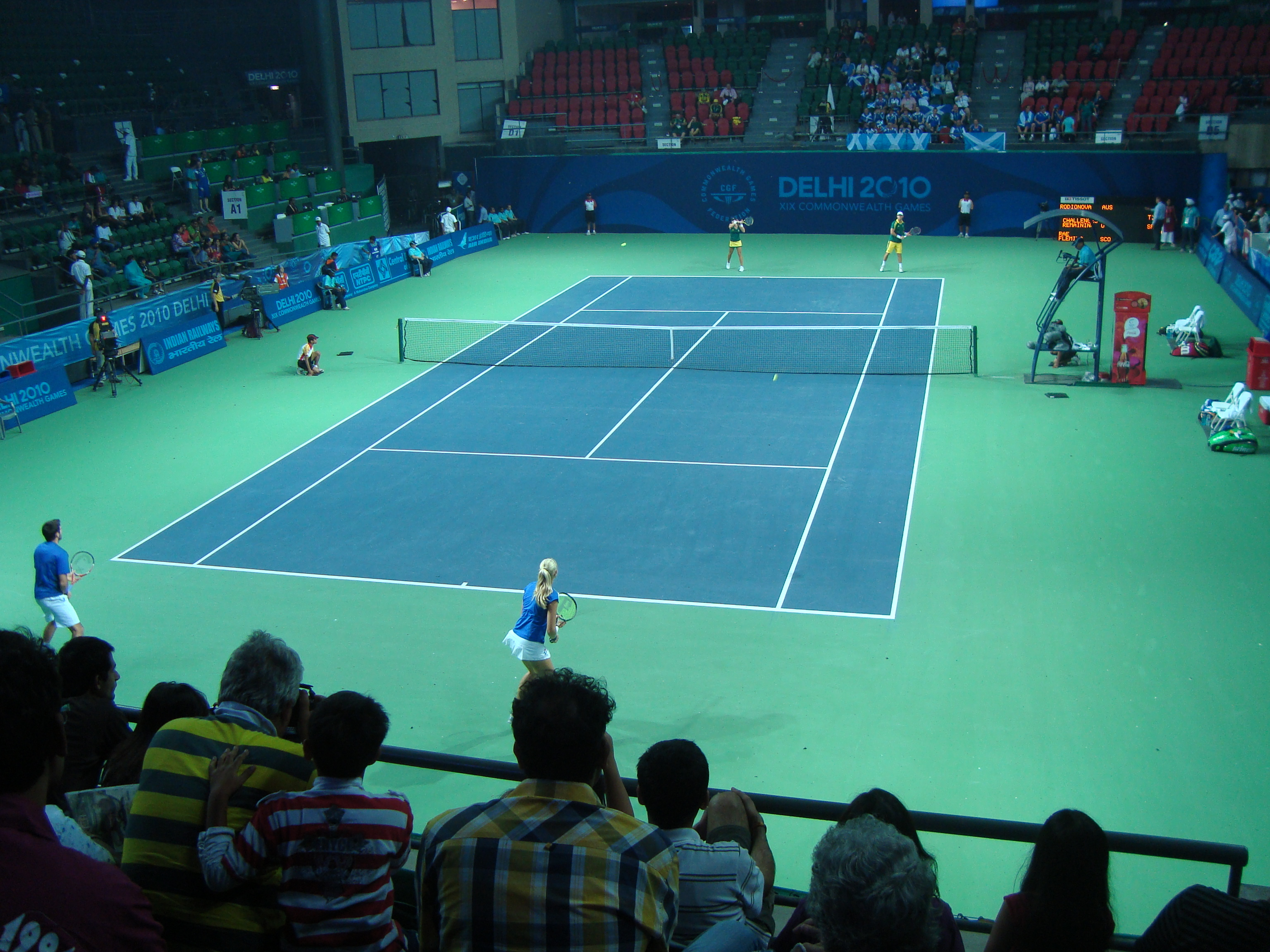
Centre Court at night at the 2010 Commonwealth Games Mixed Doubles Final between Scotland and Australia.
