= South Korea Billie Jean King Cup team =

Team that represents South Korea in the Fed Cup tennis competition

Korea, Republic of
- Other names: South Korea
- Captain: Cho Yoon-jeong
- Nations Ranking: 32 (16 November 2015)
- Colors: blue & white
- First year: 1973
- Years played: 41
- Ties played (W–L): 161 (90–71)
- Years in World Group: 19 (5–19)
- Best finish: World Group 2R (1973, 1977, 1986, 1987, 1992); World Group II (1997)
- Most total wins: Park Sung-hee (30–14)
- Most singles wins: Park Sung-hee (24–12)
- Most doubles wins: Lee Jeong-Myung (14–5); Kim Il-soon (14–6)
- Best doubles team: Kim Il-soon / Lee Jeong-Myung (12–5)
- Most ties played: Park Sung-hee (34)
- Most years played: Park Sung-hee (9)

The South Korea women's national tennis team represents South Korea (officially the Republic of Korea) in Billie Jean King Cup tennis competition and are governed by the Korea Tennis Association. They currently compete in the Asia/Oceania Zone of Group I.

== History ==
South Korea competed in its first Fed Cup in 1973. Their best result was qualifying for World Group II in 1997, and reaching the round of 16 on five occasions.

== Current team (2017) ==
- Jang Su-jeong
- Han Na-lae
- Kim Na-ri
- Choi Ji-hee

== Players ==
Last Updated: 27 August 2019

Player	W–L (Total)	W–L (Singles)	W–L (Doubles)	Ties	Debut
Cha Eun-jeong	0 – 1	-	0 – 1	1	1978
Chae Kyung-yee	7 – 6	3 – 3	4 – 3	9	2000
Chang Kyung-mi	7 – 8	2 – 2	5 – 6	15	2004
Cho Eun-hye	2 – 1	1 – 1	1 – 0	3	2007
Cho Eun-ok	0 – 1	0 – 1	-	1	1987
Cho Yoon-jeong	18 – 8	8 – 5	10 – 3	24	1997
Choi Jeom-sang	1 – 0	-	1 – 0	1	1985
Choi Jeong-ok	2 – 2	-	2 – 2	4	1985
Choi Ji-hee	2 – 1	1 – 1	1 – 0	3	2015
Choi Jin-young	3 – 4	3 – 3	0 – 1	7	2000
Choi Ju-yeon	14 – 4	3 – 2	11 – 2	14	1993
Choi Kyeong-mi	2 – 4	2 – 2	0 – 2	4	1977
Choi Young-ja	14 – 4	3 – 3	11 – 1	18	1995
Chung Yang-jin	14 – 4	8 – 1	6 – 3	15	1998
Han Eun-sook	7 – 4	1 – 0	6 – 4	10	1981
Han Na-lae	13 – 15	8 – 8	5 – 7	21	2014
Han Sung-hee	3 – 5	2 – 5	1 – 0	7	2012
Han Yoon-ja	0 – 1	0 – 1	-	1	1978
Hong Da-jung	3 – 1	3 – 0	0 – 1	3	2003
Hong Hyun-hui	0 – 3	0 – 2	0 – 1	2	2011
Im Sook-ja	2 – 3	2 – 2	0 – 1	4	1989
Jang Su-jeong	10 – 9	7 – 7	3 – 2	16	2014
Jeon Mi-ra	8 – 5	6 – 3	2 – 2	10	1996
Jeong Su-nam	3 – 3	2 – 3	1 – 0	6	2018
Kang Seo-kyung	2 – 2	-	2 – 2	4	2013
Kim Eun-ha	20 – 9	9 – 7	11 – 2	15	1995
Kim Il-soon	21 – 15	7 – 9	14 – 6	23	1986
Kim Jin-hee	5 – 3	4 – 3	1 – 0	7	2004
Kim Mi-ok	6 – 4	1 – 2	5 – 2	11	2002
Kim Na-ri	10 – 8	3 – 2	7 – 6	17	2010
Kim Nam-sook	6 – 4	4 – 2	2 – 2	7	1977
Kim So-jung	8 – 8	3 – 4	5 – 4	14	2006
Kim So-jung	1 – 1	-	1 – 1	2	2008
Kim Soo-ok	19 – 14	11 – 6	8 – 8	22	1980
Kim Yeon-sook	4 – 4	4 – 4	-	8	1991
Lee Duk-hee	21 – 20	12 – 12	9 – 8	24	1973
Lee Jeong-myung	16 – 7	2 – 2	14 – 5	19	1987
Lee Jeong-soon	9 – 7	7 – 2	2 – 5	12	1984
Lee Jin-a	11 – 7	6 – 4	5 – 3	16	2005
Lee Mi-ok	3 – 2	1 – 1	2 – 1	3	1973
Lee Soon-oh	2 – 4	-	2 – 4	6	1973
Lee So-ra	5 – 9	2 – 6	3 – 3	14	2013
Lee Ye-ra	12 – 11	9 – 8	3 – 3	21	2005
Helen Park	3 – 4	1 – 2	2 – 2	7	1976
Park Jeom-re	2 – 1	1 – 0	1 – 1	3	1986
Park Mal-sim	4 – 3	4 – 3	-	7	1988
Park Sung-hee	30 – 14	24 – 12	6 – 2	34	1991
Pyo Hye-jeong	1 – 2	-	1 – 2	3	1991
Seol Min-kyung	5 – 8	5 – 8	-	12	1981
Shin Soon-ho	5 – 4	2 – 1	3 – 3	8	1982
Sohn Mi-ae	3 – 2	-	3 – 2	5	1988
Yang Jeong-soon	10 – 6	7 – 3	3 – 3	11	1973
Yoo Mi	11 – 10	5 – 3	6 – 7	18	2006
Yu Min-hwa	2 – 6	1 – 1	1 – 5	8	2008

== See also ==
- Billie Jean King Cup
- South Korea Davis Cup team
