= Uzbekistan Billie Jean King Cup team =

Uzbekistani national women's tennis team

Uzbekistan
- Captain: Akgul Amanmuradova
- Nations Ranking: 62 ▲1 (16 November 2025)
- Colors: light blue & white
- First year: 1995
- Years played: 30
- Ties played (W–L): 124 (61–63)
- Best finish: World Group II Play-offs (2008)
- Most total wins: Akgul Amanmuradova (49–42)
- Most singles wins: Akgul Amanmuradova (28–19)
- Most doubles wins: Akgul Amanmuradova (21–23)
- Best doubles team: Akgul Amanmuradova / Iroda Tulyaganova (6–3)
- Most ties played: Akgul Amanmuradova (91)
- Most years played: Akgul Amanmuradova (22)

The Uzbekistan Billie Jean King Cup team represents Uzbekistan in Billie Jean King Cup tennis competition and are governed by the Uzbekistan Tennis Federation. They currently compete in the Asia/Oceania Zone of Group I. Current Uzbek Team consists of Kamilla Rakhimova (WTA ranking 44), Maria Timofeeva (WTA ranking 63), Polina Kudermetova (WTA ranking 91) and Sevil Yuldasheva ( WTA doubles ranking 513)

== History ==
Uzbekistan competed in its first Fed Cup in 1995. Their best result was 2nd in Asia/Oceania Group I in 2011, losing the decisive promotion play off to Japan. In 2016, Uzbekistan lost the relegation play-off against South Korea and was relegated to Asia/Oceania Zone II in 2017. In Zone II, Uzbekistan reached the promotional play-offs on each occasion 2017, 2018, and 2019, the year which they won the promotional play-offs.

== Players ==
Name	Years	First	Ties	Win/Loss		
Name	Years	First	Ties	Singles	Doubles	Total
Nigina Abduraimova	11	2010	38	13–17	12–12	25–29
Alina Abdurakhimova	1	2014	1	–	0–1	0–1
Akgul Amanmuradova	18	2001	66	25–19	20–23	45–42
Olesya Artemeva	1	1996	1	1–0	–	1–0
Elina Arutyunova	1	2004	1	–	0–1	0–1
Lilia Biktyakova	3	1996	11	2–8	2–6	4–14
Luiza Biktyakova	2	1998	8	5–0	2–4	7–4
Kamila Dadakhodjaeva	3	1999	8	1–4	1–5	2–9
Vlada Ekshibarova	3	2004	9	0–5	1–4	1–9
Arina Folts	4	2013	10	0–2	2–5	2–7
Ivanna Israilova	4	2012	15	10–5	2–9	12–14
Yasmina Karimjanova	2	2018	6	1–1	2–3	3–4
Albina Khabibulina	5	2007	19	4–3	7–10	11–13
Alexandra Kolesnichenko	1	2009	2	–	2–0	2–0
Milana Maslenkova	1	2019	1	1–0	1–0	2–0
Natalia Nikitina	5	1995	15	2–7	7–6	9–13
Setora Normurodova	1	2021	4	0–1	1–2	1–3
Dilyara Saidkhodjayeva	2	2005	7	4–1	6–0	10–1
Sabina Sharipova	11	2010	35	18–13	2–4	20–17
Anna Shchupak	2	2000	5	1–0	3–2	4–2
Svetlana Sinitsyna	1	1995	3	2–1	1–0	3–1
Iroda Tulyaganova	10	1996	35	16–11	9–9	25–20
Komola Umarova	1	2017	2	1–0	1–0	2–0
Irina Yarikova	1	1997	4	4–0	3–0	7–0
Oksana Yarikova	2	1995	4	1–1	2–1	3–2
Sevil Yuldasheva	1	2019	1	–	1–0	1–0
Svetlana Zakharchenko	1	1995	2	1–0	0–1	1–1

== See also ==
- Billie Jean King Cup
- Uzbekistan Davis Cup team
- Uzbekistan at the Hopman Cup
