= Thailand Billie Jean King Cup team =

Billie Jean King Cup team representing Thailand

Thailand
- Captain: Pracharapol Khamsaman
- Nations Ranking: 24 (16 November 2015)
- Colors: red & white
- First year: 1976
- Years played: 33
- Ties played (W–L): 116 (55–61)
- Years in World Group: 4 (0–4)
- Best finish: World Group II (2005, 2006)
- Most total wins: Tamarine Tanasugarn (50–26)
- Most singles wins: Tamarine Tanasugarn (38–16)
- Most doubles wins: Tamarine Tanasugarn (12–10)
- Best doubles team: Suvimol Duangchan / Benjamas Sangaram (4–2)
- Most ties played: Tamarine Tanasugarn (57)
- Most years played: Tamarine Tanasugarn (15)

The Thailand Fed Cup team represents Thailand in Fed Cup tennis competition and are governed by the Lawn Tennis Association of Thailand. They currently compete in the Asia/Oceania Zone of Group I.

== History ==
Thailand competed in its first Fed Cup in 1976. Their best result was reaching World Group II in 2005 and 2006.

== Current team (2017) ==
- Luksika Kumkhum
- Peangtarn Plipuech
- Nicha Lertpitaksinchai
- Kamonwan Buayam

== See also ==
- Billie Jean King Cup
- Thailand Davis Cup team
- Thailand at the Hopman Cup
- Lawn Tennis Association of Thailand
