= Chinese Taipei Billie Jean King Cup team =

Taiwanese women's tennis team

Chinese Taipei
- Captain: Wang Yi-Ning
- ITF ranking: 52 (17 November 2025)
- Colors: Blue & White
- First year: 1972
- Years played: 49
- Ties played (W–L): 182 (88 – 94)
- Years in World Group: 10 (1 – 9)
- Best finish: World Group II (2017)
- Most total wins: Wang Shi-Ting (51 – 25)
- Most singles wins: Wang Shi-Ting (33 – 12)
- Most doubles wins: Chuang Chia-Jung (19 – 5)
- Best doubles team: Chan Hao-Ching / Latisha Chan (9 – 1)
- Most ties played: Wang Shi-Ting (49)
- Most years played: Wang Shi-Ting (11); Chuang Chia-Jung (11); Chan Chin-Wei (11)

The Chinese Taipei Billie Jean King Cup team represents Taiwan in Billie Jean King Cup tennis competition and are governed by the Chinese Taipei Tennis Association. They will compete in the Asia/Oceania Group II in 2025.

== History ==
Chinese Taipei competed in its first Fed Cup in 1972. They reached the round of 16 in 1981 and the World Group II play-offs in 1999, 2007, 2016, 2017.

== 2025 ==
- Joanna Garland (Singles – WTA #203; Doubles – )
- Lee Ya-Hsuan (Singles – WTA #828; Doubles – )
- Cho Yi-Tsen (Singles – WTA #950; Doubles – WTA #185)
- Lin Fang-An (Singles – WTA #943; Doubles – WTA #328)
- Wu Fang-Hsien (Singles – ; Doubles – WTA #30)

- Yang Ya-Ying (Singles – WTA #209; Doubles – WTA #514)
- Joanna Garland (Singles – WTA #305; Doubles – )
- Liang En-Shou (Singles – WTA #295; Doubles – WTA #180)
- Hsieh Su-Wei (Singles – WTA #60.5; Doubles – WTA #1)
- Chan Hao-Ching (Singles – WTA #1073; Doubles – WTA #26)
- Ho Chih-Jen (Singles –; Doubles –)

== 2024 ==
- Yang Ya-Ying (Singles – WTA #209; Doubles – WTA #514)
- Joanna Garland (Singles – WTA #305; Doubles – )
- Liang En-Shou (Singles – WTA #295; Doubles – WTA #180)
- Hsieh Su-Wei (Singles – WTA #60.5; Doubles – WTA #1)
- Chan Hao-Ching (Singles – WTA #1073; Doubles – WTA #26)
- Ho Chih-Jen (Singles –; Doubles –)

== 2023 ==
- Chan Hao-Ching (Singles –; Doubles – WTA #24)
- Latisha Chan (Singles –; Doubles – WTA #36)
- Hsieh Su-Wei (Singles – WTA #685; Doubles – WTA #11)
- Hsu Yu Hsiou (Singles –; Doubles –)
- Madeline Jessup (Singles – WTA #1230; Doubles –)
- Lee Pei-Chi (Singles – WTA #458; Doubles – WTA #253)
- Tseng Chun-Hsin (Singles –; Doubles –)

== 2022 ==
- Lee Ya-Hsin (Singles – WTA #1202; Doubles – WTA #638)
- Yang Ya-Yi (Singles – WTA #521; Doubles – WTA #434)
- Li Yu-Yun (Singles – WTA #1072)
- Hsu Chieh-Yu (Singles – WTA #673; Doubles – WTA #290)
- Lee Pei-Chi (Singles – WTA #488; Doubles – WTA #257)

== 2021 ==
- Hsieh Su-Wei (Singles – WTA #93; Doubles – WTA #4)
- Liang En-Shuo (Singles – WTA #228; Doubles – WTA #243)
- Yang Ya-Yi (Singles – WTA #978)
- Chan Yung-Jan (Doubles – WTA #24)
- Chan Hao-Ching (Doubles – WTA #24)

== 2019 ==
- Liang En-Shuo (Singles – WTA #228; Doubles – WTA #243)
- Lee Ya-Hsuan (Singles – WTA #359; Doubles – WTA #216)
- Hsu Chieh-Yu (Singles – WTA #620; Doubles – WTA #228)
- Chan Yung-Jan (Doubles – WTA #24)
- Chan Hao-Ching (Doubles – WTA #24)

== 2018 ==
- Hsu Chieh-Yu (Singles – WTA #620; Doubles – WTA #228)
- Lee Ya-Hsuan (Singles – WTA #359; Doubles – WTA #216)
- Lee Pei-Chi (Singles – WTA #678; Doubles – WTA #469)
- Hsu Ching-Wen (Doubles – WTA #620)

== 2017 ==
=== WG II Quarter Final ===
- Chang Kai-Chen (Singles – WTA #964; Doubles – WTA #746)
- Lee Ya-Hsuan (Singles – WTA #359; Doubles – WTA #216)
- Hsu Ching-Wen (Doubles – WTA #620)
- Chan Chin-Wei

=== WG II play-offs ===
- Lee Ya-Hsuan (Singles – WTA #359; Doubles – WTA #216)
- Hsu Chieh-Yu (Singles – WTA #620; Doubles – WTA #228)
- Hsu Ching-Wen (Doubles – WTA #620)
- Chuang Chia-Jung

== 2016 ==
=== Zone Group I ===
- Chan Hao-Ching (Doubles – WTA #6)
- Chang Kai-Chen (Singles – WTA #142; Doubles – WTA #163)
- Chan Yung-Jan (Singles – WTA #564; Doubles – WTA #5)
- Hsieh Su-Wei (Singles – WTA #81; Doubles – WTA #34)

=== WG II play-offs ===
- Lee Ya-Hsuan (Singles – WTA #199; Doubles – WTA #157)
- Hsu Ching-Wen (Singles – WTA #337; Doubles – WTA #201)
- Chuang Chia-Jung (Doubles – WTA #34)
- Chan Chin-Wei (Doubles – WTA #83)

== 2015 ==
- Chan Hao-Ching (Singles – WTA #1198; Doubles – WTA #37)
- Chan Yung-Jan (Singles – WTA #180; Doubles – WTA #23)
- Hsieh Su-Wei (Singles – WTA #152; Doubles – WTA #5)
- Lee Ya-Hsuan (Singles – WTA #393; Doubles – WTA #386)

== 2014 ==
- Chan Chin-Wei (Singles – WTA #431)
- Juan Ting-Fei (Singles – WTA #0)
- Lee Ya-Hsuan (Singles – WTA #372)
- Yang Chia-Hsien (Singles – WTA #1135)

== 2013 ==
- Chan Chin-Wei (Singles – WTA #262)
- Chang Kai-Chen (Singles – WTA #114)
- Lee Hua-Chen (Singles – WTA #460)

== 2012 ==
- Chang Kai-Chen (Singles – WTA #86)
- Chan Yung-Jan (Singles – WTA #118)
- Chuang Chia-Jung (Singles – WTA #117)
- Hsieh Su-Wei (Singles – WTA #27)

== See also ==
- Billie Jean King Cup
- Chinese Taipei Davis Cup team
- Chinese Taipei at the Hopman Cup
