= 1991 Federation Cup World Group Qualifying =

The Qualifying Round for the 1991 Federation Cup was held from 18 to 21 July at the Nottingham Tennis Centre in Nottingham, United Kingdom, on hard courts.

Thirty-two teams participated in the first round. Those who lost went on to play in the Consolation rounds; while those that won went on to play-off again, with the eight winners advancing to the World Group.

== Draw ==
First Round
Paraguay	3
Jamaica	0
Philippines	1
Chile	2
Trinidad and Tobago	0
Malta	3
Ireland	1
Greece	2
Malaysia	0
Mexico	3
Sri Lanka	0
Denmark	3
Portugal	3
Bahamas	0
Chinese Taipei	3
Dominican Republic	0

Qualifying Round
Paraguay	2
Chile	1
Malta	1
Greece	2
Mexico	0
Denmark	3
Portugal	2
Chinese Taipei	1

First Round
Romania	2
Thailand	1
Cuba	3
India	0
Luxembourg	3
Bolivia	0
Norway	1
China	2
Israel	2
South Korea	1
Hong Kong	0
Venezuela	3
Uruguay	3
Turkey	0
Kenya	0
Poland	3

Qualifying Round
Romania	3
Cuba	0
Luxembourg	1
China	2
Israel	3
Venezuela	0
Uruguay	0
Poland	3

== First round ==
=== Paraguay vs. Jamaica ===
Paraguay
3
Nottingham Tennis Centre, Nottingham, United Kingdom
18 July 1991
Hard

Jamaica
0

			1	2	3
1	(Paraguay) (Jamaica)	Larissa Schaerer; Henrietta Harris	6; 2	6; 3
2	(Paraguay) (Jamaica)	Rossana de los Ríos; Iwalani McCalla	6; 3	7^{10} 6^{8}
3	(Paraguay) (Jamaica)	Rossana de los Ríos / Larissa Schaerer; Iwalani McCalla / Joni Van Ryck De Groot	6; 4	7; 5

=== Philippines vs. Chile ===
Philippines
1
Nottingham Tennis Centre, Nottingham, United Kingdom
18 July 1991
Hard

Chile
2

			1	2	3
1	(Philippines) (Chile)	Francesca La'O; Paula Cabezas	4; 6	7; 5	1; 6
2	(Philippines) (Chile)	Jennifer Saret; Macarena Miranda	6; 3	7; 5
3	(Philippines) (Chile)	Francesca La'O / Jennifer Saret; Paula Cabezas / Carolina Espinoza	4; 6	6^{5} 7^{7}

=== Trinidad and Tobago vs. Malta ===
Trinidad and Tobago
0
Nottingham Tennis Centre, Nottingham, United Kingdom
18 July 1991
Hard

Malta
3

			1	2	3
1	(Trinidad and Tobago) (Malta)	Marianne Ward; Helen Asciak	0; 6	2; 6
2	(Trinidad and Tobago) (Malta)	Beverly Corbie; Carol Cassar-Torreggiani	6; 2	4; 6	4; 6
3	(Trinidad and Tobago) (Malta)	Jacinta Ayers / Beverly Corbie; Helen Asciak / Carol Cassar-Torreggiani	2; 6	1; 6

=== Ireland vs. Greece ===
Ireland
1
Nottingham Tennis Centre, Nottingham, United Kingdom
18 July 1991
Hard

Greece
2

			1	2	3
1	(Republic of Ireland) (Greece)	Gina Niland; Christína Papadáki	4; 6	4; 6
2	(Republic of Ireland) (Greece)	Siobhán Nicholson; Angeliki Kanellopoulou	4; 6	2; 6
3	(Republic of Ireland) (Greece)	Siobhán Nicholson / Gina Niland; Christína Papadáki / Lidia Soulti	6; 2	6; 4

=== Malaysia vs. Mexico ===
Malaysia
0
Nottingham Tennis Centre, Nottingham, United Kingdom
18 July 1991
Hard

Mexico
3

			1	2	3
1	(Malaysia) (Mexico)	Chiew Chern-yi; Isabela Petrov	1; 6	3; 6
2	(Malaysia) (Mexico)	Ng Su-peng; Lupita Novelo	2; 6	2; 6
3	(Malaysia) (Mexico)	Lee Tze-may / Wan Su-haiza; Aránzazu Gallardo / Lupita Novelo	1; 6	0; 6

=== Sri Lanka vs. Denmark ===
Sri Lanka
0
Nottingham Tennis Centre, Nottingham, United Kingdom
18 July 1991
Hard

Denmark
3

			1	2	3
1	(Sri Lanka) (Denmark)	Vajira Premaratne; Karin Ptaszek	1; 6	0; 6
2	(Sri Lanka) (Denmark)	Lihini Weerasuriya; Sofie Albinus	2; 6	3; 6
3	(Sri Lanka) (Denmark)	Dilshani Manawadu / Lihini Weerasuriya; Sofie Albinus / Karin Ptaszek	1; 6	0; 6

=== Portugal vs. Bahamas ===
Portugal
3
Nottingham Tennis Centre, Nottingham, United Kingdom
18 July 1991
Hard

Bahamas
0

			1	2	3
1	(Portugal) (The Bahamas)	Tânia Couto; Lori Feingold	6; 0	6; 1
2	(Portugal) (The Bahamas)	Sofia Prazeres; Kim Cartwright	6; 3	6; 3
3	(Portugal) (The Bahamas)	Tânia Couto / Sofia Prazeres; Robyn Farrington / Kim Cartwright	6; 3	6; 4

=== Chinese Taipei vs. Dominican Republic ===
Chinese Taipei
3
Nottingham Tennis Centre, Nottingham, United Kingdom
18 July 1991
Hard

Dominican Republic
0

			1	2	3
1	(Chinese Taipei) (Dominican Republic)	Lin Ya-hui; Patricia Rodríguez	6; 0	6; 0
2	(Chinese Taipei) (Dominican Republic)	Wang Shi-ting; Joelle Schad	6; 2	7^{7} 6^{4}
3	(Chinese Taipei) (Dominican Republic)	Lai Su-lin / Wang Shi-ting; Patricia Rodríguez / Joelle Schad	6; 2	6; 4

=== Romania vs. Thailand ===
Romania
2
Nottingham Tennis Centre, Nottingham, United Kingdom
19 July 1991
Hard

Thailand
1

			1	2	3
1	(Romania) (Thailand)	Loredana Bujor; Benjamas Sangaram	6; 2	6; 2
2	(Romania) (Thailand)	Irina Spîrlea; Suvimol Duangchan	2; 6	4; 6
3	(Romania) (Thailand)	Ruxandra Dragomir / Irina Spîrlea; Krisna Summa / Tossaporn Summa	6; 2	4; 6	6; 0

=== Cuba vs. India ===
Cuba
3
Nottingham Tennis Centre, Nottingham, United Kingdom
19 July 1991
Hard

India
0

			1	2	3
1	(Cuba) (India)	Belkis Rodríguez; Aradhana Reddy	7; 5	6; 3
2	(Cuba) (India)	Rita Pichardo; Divya Merchant	7; 5	6; 1
3	(Cuba) (India)	Rita Pichardo / Belkis Rodríguez; Sohini Kumari / Divya Merchant	6; 3	7; 5

=== Luxembourg vs. Bolivia ===
Luxembourg
3
Nottingham Tennis Centre, Nottingham, United Kingdom
19 July 1991
Hard

Bolivia
0

			1	2	3
1	(Luxembourg) (Bolivia)	Anne Kremer; Cecilia Ampuero	4; 6	7; 5	7; 5
2	(Luxembourg) (Bolivia)	Marie-Christine Goy; Natasha Villarroel	6; 4	6; 2
3	(Luxembourg) (Bolivia)	Marie-Christine Goy / Rosabel Moyen; Patricia Sandagorda / Natasha Villarroel	6; 2	6; 2

=== Norway vs. China ===
Norway
1
Nottingham Tennis Centre, Nottingham, United Kingdom
19 July 1991
Hard

China
2

			1	2	3
1	(Norway) (China)	Cathrine Instebø; Tang Min	2; 6	6; 3	3; 6
2	(Norway) (China)	Amy Jönsson Raaholt; Li Fang	6; 2	6; 2
3	(Norway) (China)	Amy Jönsson Raaholt / Astrid Sunde; Li Fang / Tang Min	3; 6	4; 6

=== Israel vs. South Korea ===
Israel
2
Nottingham Tennis Centre, Nottingham, United Kingdom
19 July 1991
Hard

South Korea
1

			1	2	3
1	(Israel) (South Korea)	Ilana Berger; Park Sung-hee	2; 6	5; 7
2	(Israel) (South Korea)	Yael Segal; Kim Yeon-sook	7; 5	6; 3
3	(Israel) (South Korea)	Ilana Berger / Limor Zaltz; Pyo Hye-jeong / Sohn Mi-ae	6; 3	6; 2

=== Hong Kong vs. Venezuela ===
Hong Kong
0
Nottingham Tennis Centre, Nottingham, United Kingdom
19 July 1991
Hard

Venezuela
3

			1	2	3
1	(Hong Kong) (Venezuela)	Chan Lee; Ninfa Marra	3; 6	2; 6
2	(Hong Kong) (Venezuela)	Ellinore Lightbody; Melissa Mazzotta	4; 6	4; 6
3	(Hong Kong) (Venezuela)	Chan Lee / Ellinore Lightbody; María Virginia Francesa / Melissa Mazzotta	6; 4	0; 6	0; 6

=== Uruguay vs. Turkey ===
Uruguay
3
Nottingham Tennis Centre, Nottingham, United Kingdom
19 July 1991
Hard

Turkey
0

			1	2	3
1	(Uruguay) (Turkey)	Laura Olave; İsmet Duygu Akşit Oal	7; 5	7^{8} 6^{6}
2	(Uruguay) (Turkey)	Patricia Miller; Esra Bayburt	6; 2	6; 0
3	(Uruguay) (Turkey)	Claudia Brause / Patricia Miller; İsmet Duygu Akşit Oal / Gülberk Gültekin	2; 6	6; 1	6; 1

=== Kenya vs. Poland ===
Kenya
0
Nottingham Tennis Centre, Nottingham, United Kingdom
19 July 1991
Hard

Poland
3

			1	2	3
1	(Kenya) (Poland)	Louise Wekesa; Magdalena Feistel	0; 6	0; 6
2	(Kenya) (Poland)	Anita Aggarwal; Katarzyna Nowak	0; 6	0; 6
3	(Kenya) (Poland)	Kathryn Katibi / Louise Wekesa; Magdalena Feistel / Katarzyna Teodorowicz-Lisowska	0; 6	0; 6

== Qualifying round ==
=== Paraguay vs. Chile ===
Paraguay
2
Nottingham Tennis Centre, Nottingham, United Kingdom
20 July 1991
Hard

Chile
1

			1	2	3
1	(Paraguay) (Chile)	Larissa Schaerer; Paula Cabezas	6; 1	7; 5
2	(Paraguay) (Chile)	Rossana de los Ríos; Macarena Miranda	6; 2	6; 3
3	(Paraguay) (Chile)	Rossana de los Ríos / Larissa Schaerer; Paula Cabezas / Macarena Miranda	3; 6	3; 6

=== Malta vs. Greece ===
Malta
1
Nottingham Tennis Centre, Nottingham, United Kingdom
20 July 1991
Hard

Greece
2

			1	2	3
1	(Malta) (Greece)	Helen Asciak; Christína Papadáki	4; 6	2; 6
2	(Malta) (Greece)	Carol Cassar-Torreggiani; Angeliki Kanellopoulou	2; 6	4; 6
3	(Malta) (Greece)	Helen Asciak / Carol Cassar-Torreggiani; Christína Papadáki / Lidia Soulti	0; 6	6; 4	6; 2

=== Mexico vs. Denmark ===
Mexico
0
Nottingham Tennis Centre, Nottingham, United Kingdom
20 July 1991
Hard

Denmark
3

			1	2	3
1	(Mexico) (Denmark)	Isabela Petrov; Karin Ptaszek	7; 5	2; 6	3; 6
2	(Mexico) (Denmark)	Lupita Novelo; Sofie Albinus	2; 6	3; 6
3	(Mexico) (Denmark)	Aránzazu Gallardo / Lupita Novelo; Sofie Albinus / Karin Ptaszek	6^{6} 7^{8}	3; 6

=== Portugal vs. Chinese Taipei ===
Portugal
2
Nottingham Tennis Centre, Nottingham, United Kingdom
20 July 1991
Hard

Chinese Taipei
1

			1	2	3
1	(Portugal) (Chinese Taipei)	Tânia Couto; Lin Ya-hui	6; 0	6; 1
2	(Portugal) (Chinese Taipei)	Sofia Prazeres; Wang Shi-ting	4; 6	3; 6
3	(Portugal) (Chinese Taipei)	Tânia Couto / Sofia Prazeres; Lai Su-lin / Wang Shi-ting	6; 4	3; 6	6; 4

=== Romania vs. Cuba ===
Romania
3
Nottingham Tennis Centre, Nottingham, United Kingdom
21 July 1991
Hard

Cuba
0

			1	2	3
1	(Romania) (Cuba)	Ruxandra Dragomir; Belkis Rodríguez	6; 1	6; 4
2	(Romania) (Cuba)	Irina Spîrlea; Rita Pichardo	6; 3	4; 6	6; 3
3	(Romania) (Cuba)	Loredana Bujor / Irina Spîrlea; Iluminada Concepción / Belkis Rodríguez	6; 2	6; 4

=== Luxembourg vs. China ===
Luxembourg
1
Nottingham Tennis Centre, Nottingham, United Kingdom
21 July 1991
Hard

China
2

			1	2	3
1	(Luxembourg) (China)	Anne Kremer; Yang Li-Hua	7; 5	7; 5
2	(Luxembourg) (China)	Marie-Christine Goy; Tang Min	6; 1	4; 6	3; 6
3	(Luxembourg) (China)	Marie-Christine Goy / Rosabel Moyen; Li Fang / Tang Min	3; 6	2; 6

=== Israel vs. Venezuela ===
Israel
3
Nottingham Tennis Centre, Nottingham, United Kingdom
21 July 1991
Hard

Venezuela
0

			1	2	3
1	(Israel) (Venezuela)	Ilana Berger; Ninfa Marra	6; 4	6; 1
2	(Israel) (Venezuela)	Yael Segal; Melissa Mazzotta	6; 4	6; 4
3	(Israel) (Venezuela)	Ilana Berger / Limor Zaltz; María Virginia Francesa / Melissa Mazzotta	7^{7} 6^{4}	6; 3

=== Uruguay vs. Poland ===
Uruguay
0
Nottingham Tennis Centre, Nottingham, United Kingdom
21 July 1991
Hard

Poland
3

			1	2	3
1	(Uruguay) (Poland)	Laura Olave; Magdalena Feistel	6^{3} 7^{7}	1; 6
2	(Uruguay) (Poland)	Patricia Miller; Katarzyna Nowak	0; 6	0; 6
3	(Uruguay) (Poland)	Claudia Brause / Patricia Miller; Magdalena Feistel / Katarzyna Teodorowicz-Lisowska	3; 6	2; 6
