= 1991 Federation Cup Consolation Rounds =

The Consolation Rounds for the 1991 Federation Cup was held from 19 to 23 July at the Nottingham Tennis Centre in Nottingham, United Kingdom, on hard courts.

The sixteen teams that were defeated in the first round of qualifying participated in the four-round knockout competition.

== Participating teams ==
Participating teams
Bahamas	Bolivia	Dominican Republic	Hong Kong
India	Ireland	Jamaica	Kenya
Malaysia	Norway	Philippines	South Korea
Sri Lanka	Thailand	Trinidad and Tobago	Turkey

== Draw ==
First Round; 19–20 July
South Korea	3
Hong Kong	0
Bolivia	1
Norway	2
Thailand	3
India	0
Turkey	3
Kenya	0
Jamaica	1
Philippines	2
Malaysia	0
Sri Lanka	3
Bahamas	1
Dominican Republic	2
Trinidad and Tobago	0
Ireland	3

Quarterfinals; 21 July
South Korea	1
Norway	2
Thailand	3
Turkey	0
Philippines	2
Sri Lanka	1
Dominican Republic	1
Ireland	2

Semifinals; 22 July
Norway	3
Thailand	0
Philippines	1
Ireland	2

Final; 23 July
Norway	2
Ireland	1

== First round ==
=== South Korea vs. Hong Kong ===
South Korea
3
Nottingham Tennis Centre, Nottingham, United Kingdom
20 July 1991
Hard

Hong Kong
0

			1	2	3
1	(South Korea) (Hong Kong)	Park Sung-hee; Chan Lee	6; 4	6; 1
2	(South Korea) (Hong Kong)	Kim Yeon-sook; Ellinore Lightbody	6; 3	6; 4
3	(South Korea) (Hong Kong)	Pyo Hye-jeong / Sohn Mi-ae; Chan Lee / Ellinore Lightbody	6; 4	6; 2

=== Bolivia vs. Norway ===
Bolivia
1
Nottingham Tennis Centre, Nottingham, United Kingdom
20 July 1991
Hard

Norway
2

			1	2	3
1	(Bolivia) (Norway)	Cecilia Ampuero; Cathrine Instebø	6; 4	6; 1
2	(Bolivia) (Norway)	Natasha Villarroel; Amy Jonsson-Råholt	1; 6	2; 6
3	(Bolivia) (Norway)	Cecilia Ampuero / Natasha Villarroel; Amy Jonsson-Råholt / Astrid Sunde	1; 6	3; 6

=== Thailand vs. India ===
Thailand
3
Nottingham Tennis Centre, Nottingham, United Kingdom
20 July 1991
Hard

India
0

			1	2	3
1	(Thailand) (India)	Benjamas Sangaram; Janaki Krishnamoorthy	6; 0	6; 3
2	(Thailand) (India)	Suvimol Duangchan; Divya Merchant	3; 6	6; 2	11; 9
3	(Thailand) (India)	Krisna Summa / Tossaporn Summa; Sohini Kumari / Aradhana Reddy	3; 6	7; 5	6; 1

=== Turkey vs. Kenya ===
Turkey
3
Nottingham Tennis Centre, Nottingham, United Kingdom
20 July 1991
Hard

Kenya
0

			1	2	3
1	(Turkey) (Kenya)	Duygu Akşit Oal; Louise Wekesa	6; 0	6; 1
2	(Turkey) (Kenya)	Esra Bayburt; Anita Aggarwal	6; 1	6; 0
3	(Turkey) (Kenya)	Esra Bayburt / Yasmin Kaya; Anita Aggarwal / Kathryn Katibi	6; 1	6; 2

=== Jamaica vs. Philippines ===
Jamaica
1
Nottingham Tennis Centre, Nottingham, United Kingdom
19 July 1991
Hard

Philippines
2

			1	2	3
1	(Jamaica) (Philippines)	Henrietta Harris; Francesca La'O	5; 7	4; 6
2	(Jamaica) (Philippines)	Iwalani McCalla; Jennifer Saret	6; 4	7; 5
3	(Jamaica) (Philippines)	Iwalani McCalla / Joni Van Ryck De Groot; Francesca La'O / Jennifer Saret	6; 3	1; 6	4; 6

=== Malaysia vs. Sri Lanka ===
Malaysia
0
Nottingham Tennis Centre, Nottingham, United Kingdom
19 July 1991
Hard

Sri Lanka
3

			1	2	3
1	(Malaysia) (Sri Lanka)	Chiew Chern-yi; Vajira Premaratne	7^{7} 6^{2}	6^{7} 7^{9}	3; 6
2	(Malaysia) (Sri Lanka)	Ng Su-peng; Lihini Weerasuriya	1; 6	0; 6
3	(Malaysia) (Sri Lanka)	Chiew Chern-yi / Ng Su-peng; Vajira Premaratne / Lihini Weerasuriya	3; 6	2; 6

=== Bahamas vs. Dominican Republic ===
Bahamas
1
Nottingham Tennis Centre, Nottingham, United Kingdom
19 July 1991
Hard

Dominican Republic
2

			1	2	3
1	(The Bahamas) (Dominican Republic)	Robyn Farrington; Patricia Rodríguez	7; 5	6; 3
2	(The Bahamas) (Dominican Republic)	Kim Cartwright; Joelle Schad	0; 6	2; 6
3	(The Bahamas) (Dominican Republic)	Robyn Farrington / Kim Cartwright; Patricia Rodríguez / Joelle Schad	6; 2	6^{4} 7^{7}	4; 6

=== Trinidad and Tobago vs. Ireland ===
Trinidad and Tobago
0
Nottingham Tennis Centre, Nottingham, United Kingdom
19 July 1991
Hard

Ireland
3

			1	2	3
1	(Trinidad and Tobago) (Republic of Ireland)	Marianne Ward; Gina Niland	1; 6	0; 6
2	(Trinidad and Tobago) (Republic of Ireland)	Beverly Corbie; Siobhán Nicholson	2; 6	2; 6
3	(Trinidad and Tobago) (Republic of Ireland)	Jacinta Ayers / Beverly Corbie; Fiona Long / Siobhán Nicholson	4; 6	1; 6

== Quarterfinals ==
=== South Korea vs. Norway ===
South Korea
1
Nottingham Tennis Centre, Nottingham, United Kingdom
21 July 1991
Hard

Norway
2

			1	2	3
1	(South Korea) (Norway)	Park Sung-hee; Cathrine Instebø	6; 4	6; 2
2	(South Korea) (Norway)	Kim Yeon-sook; Amy Jonsson-Råholt	1; 6	0; 6
3	(South Korea) (Norway)	Pyo Hye-jeong / Sohn Mi-ae; Amy Jonsson-Råholt / Astrid Sunde	2; 6	3; 6

=== Thailand vs. Turkey ===
Thailand
3
Nottingham Tennis Centre, Nottingham, United Kingdom
21 July 1991
Hard

Turkey
0

			1	2	3
1	(Thailand) (Turkey)	Suvimol Duangchan; Gülberk Gültekin	6; 2	1; 6	6; 1
2	(Thailand) (Turkey)	Krisna Summa; Duygu Akşit Oal	6; 3	7; 5
3	(Thailand) (Turkey)	Suvimol Duangchan / Benjamas Sangaram; Esra Bayburt / Gülberk Gültekin	6; 0	6; 2

=== Philippines vs. Sri Lanka ===
Philippines
2
Nottingham Tennis Centre, Nottingham, United Kingdom
21 July 1991
Hard

Sri Lanka
1

			1	2	3
1	(Philippines) (Sri Lanka)	Francesca La'O; Vajira Premaratne	6; 0	6; 4
2	(Philippines) (Sri Lanka)	Jennifer Saret; Lihini Weerasuriya	4; 6	2; 6
3	(Philippines) (Sri Lanka)	Francesca La'O / Jennifer Saret; Vajira Premaratne / Lihini Weerasuriya	2; 6	6; 1	6; 1

=== Dominican Republic vs. Ireland ===
Dominican Republic
1
Nottingham Tennis Centre, Nottingham, United Kingdom
21 July 1991
Hard

Ireland
2

			1	2	3
1	(Dominican Republic) (Republic of Ireland)	Patricia Rodríguez; Gina Niland	0; 6	0; 6
2	(Dominican Republic) (Republic of Ireland)	Joelle Schad; Siobhán Nicholson	6; 2	3; 6	6; 1
3	(Dominican Republic) (Republic of Ireland)	Patricia Rodríguez / Joelle Schad; Siobhán Nicholson / Gina Niland	2; 6	0; 6

== Semifinals ==
=== Norway vs. Thailand ===
Norway
3
Nottingham Tennis Centre, Nottingham, United Kingdom
22 July 1991
Hard

Thailand
0

			1	2	3
1	(Norway) (Thailand)	Cathrine Instebø; Suvimol Duangchan	6; 1	6; 2
2	(Norway) (Thailand)	Amy Jonsson-Råholt; Krisna Summa	6; 1	6; 3
3	(Norway) (Thailand)	Amy Jonsson-Råholt / Astrid Sunde; Suvimol Duangchan / Krisna Summa	6; 4	3; 6	6; 4

=== Philippines vs. Ireland ===
Philippines
1
Nottingham Tennis Centre, Nottingham, United Kingdom
22 July 1991
Hard

Ireland
2

			1	2	3
1	(Philippines) (Republic of Ireland)	Francesca La'O; Gina Niland	4; 6	0; 6
2	(Philippines) (Republic of Ireland)	Jennifer Saret; Siobhán Nicholson	6; 1	6; 4
3	(Philippines) (Republic of Ireland)	Francesca La'O / Jennifer Saret; Siobhán Nicholson / Gina Niland	6; 1	3; 6	1; 6

== Final ==
=== Norway vs. Ireland ===
Norway
2
Nottingham Tennis Centre, Nottingham, United Kingdom
23 July 1991
Hard

Ireland
1

			1	2	3
1	(Norway) (Republic of Ireland)	Cathrine Instebø; Gina Niland	1; 6	3; 6
2	(Norway) (Republic of Ireland)	Amy Jonsson-Råholt; Siobhán Nicholson	6; 4	6; 3
3	(Norway) (Republic of Ireland)	Amy Jonsson-Råholt / Astrid Sunde; Siobhán Nicholson / Gina Niland	6; 3	3; 6	6; 1
