= 1990 Federation Cup (tennis) =

International women's tennis competition

Details
- Duration: 21–29 July
- Edition: 28th

Champion
- Winning nation: United States

The 1990 Federation Cup was the 28th edition of the most important competition between national teams in women's tennis. The tournament was held at the Peachtree World of Tennis in Peachtree Corners (then unincorporated Gwinnett County), GA, United States, from 21 to 29 July. The United States defeated the Soviet Union in the final, giving the USA their 14th and 2nd consecutive title.

== Qualifying rounds ==
All ties were played at the Peachtree World of Tennis in Peachtree Corners, GA, United States, on hard courts.

=== Pre-qualifying ===
Winning team	Score	Losing team
Chinese Taipei	3–0	Bahamas
Malta	3–0	Sri Lanka
Philippines	2–1	Trinidad and Tobago

Winning nations advance to Main Qualifying, losing nations play in Consolation Qualifying round.

==== Chinese Taipei vs. Bahamas ====
Chinese Taipei
3
Peachtree World of Tennis, Norcross, Georgia, United States
July 1990
Hard (outdoors)

Bahamas
0

			1	2	3
1	(Chinese Taipei) (The Bahamas)	Lai Su-lin; Robyn Farrington	6; 0	6; 1
2	(Chinese Taipei) (The Bahamas)	Wang Shi-ting; Kim Cartwright	6; 2	6; 1
3	(Chinese Taipei) (The Bahamas)	Lai Su-lin / Wang Shi-ting; Robyn Farrington / Kim Cartwright	6; 2	6; 3

==== Malta vs. Sri Lanka ====
Malta
3
Peachtree World of Tennis, Norcross, Georgia, United States
July 1990
Hard (outdoors)

Sri Lanka
0

			1	2	3
1	(Malta) (Sri Lanka)	Katherine Camilleri; Vajira Premaratne	6; 3	5; 7	6; 3
2	(Malta) (Sri Lanka)	Carol Cassar-Torreggiani; Lihini Weerasuriya	6; 1	6; 4
3	(Malta) (Sri Lanka)	Katherine Camilleri / Carol Cassar-Torreggiani; Sobhini De Silva / Vajira Premaratne	6; 1	6; 0

==== Philippines vs. Trinidad and Tobago ====
Philippines
2
Peachtree World of Tennis, Norcross, Georgia, United States
July 1990
Hard (outdoors)

Trinidad and Tobago
1

			1	2	3
1	(Philippines) (Trinidad and Tobago)	Jennifer Saret; Marianne Ward	6; 1	6; 1
2	(Philippines) (Trinidad and Tobago)	Sarah Castillejo; Beverly Corbie	4; 6	3; 6
3	(Philippines) (Trinidad and Tobago)	Dyan Castillejo / Yvette Castillejo; Beverly Corbie / Donna Millington	6; 1	6; 3

=== Main Qualifying ===
Winning team	Score	Losing team
Chinese Taipei	2–1	Venezuela
South Korea	2–1	Luxembourg
Dominican Republic	2–0	Thailand
China	2–1	Mexico
Hong Kong	3–0	Malaysia
Israel	2–0	Ireland

Winning team	Score	Losing team
Indonesia	2–1	Yugoslavia
Finland	3–0	Jamaica
Denmark	2–0	Norway
Poland	2–1	Uruguay
Greece	3–0	Malta
Bulgaria	3–0	Philippines

Winning nations advance to Main Draw, losing nations play in Consolation Qualifying round.

==== Chinese Taipei vs. Venezuela ====
Chinese Taipei
2
Peachtree World of Tennis, Norcross, Georgia, United States
July 1990
Hard (outdoors)

Venezuela
1

			1	2	3
1	(Chinese Taipei) (Venezuela)	Lai Su-lin; Emily Leonardi	0; 6	1; 6
2	(Chinese Taipei) (Venezuela)	Wang Shi-ting; María Vento	7; 5	6; 3
3	(Chinese Taipei) (Venezuela)	Lai Su-lin / Wang Shi-ting; Emily Leonardi / María Vento	5; 7	6; 2	6; 4

==== South Korea vs. Luxembourg ====
South Korea
2
Peachtree World of Tennis, Norcross, Georgia, United States
July 1990
Hard (outdoors)

Luxembourg
1

			1	2	3
1	(South Korea) (Luxembourg)	Park Mal-sim; Marie-Christine Goy	6; 1	6; 0
2	(South Korea) (Luxembourg)	Kim Il-soon; Karin Kschwendt	2; 6	2; 6
3	(South Korea) (Luxembourg)	Kim Il-soon / Lee Jeong-myung; Marie-Christine Goy / Karin Kschwendt	7; 5	6^{2} 7^{7}	6; 4

==== Dominican Republic vs. Thailand ====
Dominican Republic
2
Peachtree World of Tennis, Norcross, Georgia, United States
July 1990
Hard (outdoors)

Thailand
0

			1	2	3
1	(Dominican Republic) (Thailand)	Joelle Schad; Tossaporn Summa	6; 1	7^{7} 6^{3}
2	(Dominican Republic) (Thailand)	Madeleine Sánchez; Orawan Thampensri	6; 3	6; 3
3	(Dominican Republic) (Thailand)					not played

==== China vs. Mexico ====
China
2
Peachtree World of Tennis, Norcross, Georgia, United States
July 1990
Hard (outdoors)

Mexico
1

			1	2	3
1	(China) (Mexico)	Li Fang; Aránzazu Gallardo	6; 4	6; 1
2	(China) (Mexico)	Tang Min; Angélica Gavaldón	1; 6	4; 6
3	(China) (Mexico)	Li Fang / Tang Min; Angélica Gavaldón / Lupita Novelo	6; 4	4; 6	6; 4

==== Hong Kong vs. Malaysia ====
Hong Kong
3
Peachtree World of Tennis, Norcross, Georgia, United States
July 1990
Hard (outdoors)

Malaysia
0

			1	2	3
1	(Hong Kong) (Malaysia)	Ellinore Lightbody; Lee Tze-may	6; 0	6; 0
2	(Hong Kong) (Malaysia)	Paulette Moreno; Ng Su-peng	6; 2	6; 0
3	(Hong Kong) (Malaysia)	Ellinore Lightbody / Pang Sheung; Kerry Anne Lim / Leena Singarajah	6; 1	6; 1

==== Israel vs. Ireland ====
Israel
2
Peachtree World of Tennis, Norcross, Georgia, United States
July 1990
Hard (outdoors)

Ireland
0

			1	2	3
1	(Israel) (Republic of Ireland)	Ilana Berger; Jennifer Thornton	6; 2	6; 2
2	(Israel) (Republic of Ireland)	Yael Segal; Lesley O'Halloran	6; 1	6; 3
3	(Israel) (Republic of Ireland)					not played

==== Indonesia vs. Yugoslavia ====
Indonesia
2
Peachtree World of Tennis, Norcross, Georgia, United States
July 1990
Hard (outdoors)

Yugoslavia
1

			1	2	3
1	(Indonesia) (Socialist Federal Republic of Yugoslavia)	Suzanna Anggarkusuma; Gorana Matić	4; 6	4; 6
2	(Indonesia) (Socialist Federal Republic of Yugoslavia)	Yayuk Basuki; Nadin Ercegović	6; 0	6^{3} 7^{7}	8; 6
3	(Indonesia) (Socialist Federal Republic of Yugoslavia)	Irawati Moerid / Suzanna Anggarkusuma; Sabrina Goleš / Gorana Matić	6; 4	6; 3

==== Finland vs. Jamaica ====
Finland
3
Peachtree World of Tennis, Norcross, Georgia, United States
July 1990
Hard (outdoors)

Jamaica
0

			1	2	3
1	(Finland) (Jamaica)	Petra Thorén; Henrietta Harris	6; 1	6; 1
2	(Finland) (Jamaica)	Nanne Dahlman; Joni Van Ryck De Groot	6; 1	6; 1
3	(Finland) (Jamaica)	Nanne Dahlman / Petra Thorén; Henrietta Harris / Joni Van Ryck De Groot	6; 1	6; 2

==== Denmark vs. Norway ====
Denmark
2
Peachtree World of Tennis, Norcross, Georgia, United States
July 1990
Hard (outdoors)

Norway
0

			1	2	3
1	(Denmark) (Norway)	Sofie Albinus; Cathrine Instebø	6; 3	6; 2
2	(Denmark) (Norway)	Tine Scheuer-Larsen; Amy Jönsson Raaholt	3; 6	6; 4	6; 3
3	(Denmark) (Norway)					not played

==== Poland vs. Uruguay ====
Poland
2
Peachtree World of Tennis, Norcross, Georgia, United States
July 1990
Hard (outdoors)

Uruguay
1

			1	2	3
1	(Poland) (Uruguay)	Magdalena Feistel; Claudia Brause	6; 2	6; 1
2	(Poland) (Uruguay)	Katarzyna Nowak; Patricia Miller	6; 2	4; 6	0; 2	retired
3	(Poland) (Uruguay)	Magdalena Feistel / Renata Skrzypczyńska; Claudia Brause / Patricia Miller	6; 2	6; 4

==== Greece vs. Malta ====
Greece
3
Peachtree World of Tennis, Norcross, Georgia, United States
July 1990
Hard (outdoors)

Malta
0

			1	2	3
1	(Greece) (Malta)	Olga Tsarbopoulou; Katherine Camilleri	6; 1	6; 2
2	(Greece) (Malta)	Angeliki Kanellopoulou; Carol Cassar-Torreggiani	6; 3	6; 3
3	(Greece) (Malta)	Angeliki Kanellopoulou / Olga Tsarbopoulou; Katherine Camilleri / Carol Cassar-Torreggiani	6; 4	6; 0

==== Bulgaria vs. Philippines ====
Bulgaria
3
Peachtree World of Tennis, Norcross, Georgia, United States
July 1990
Hard (outdoors)

Philippines
0

			1	2	3
1	(Bulgaria) (Philippines)	Dora Rangelova; Jennifer Saret	6; 2	6; 3
2	(Bulgaria) (Philippines)	Elena Pampoulova; Sarah Castillejo	6; 2	6; 0
3	(Bulgaria) (Philippines)	Galia Angelova / Dora Rangelova; Dyan Castillejo / Yvette Castillejo	3; 6	6; 1	7; 5

== Main draw ==
Participating Teams
Argentina	Australia	Austria	Belgium	Brazil	Bulgaria	Canada	China
Chinese Taipei	Czechoslovakia	Denmark	Dominican Republic	Finland	France	Germany	Great Britain
Greece	Hong Kong	Hungary	Indonesia	Israel	Italy	Japan	Netherlands
New Zealand	Poland	South Korea	Soviet Union	Spain	Sweden	Switzerland	United States

First Round
United States	3
Q	Poland	0
Sweden	1
Belgium	2
Australia	2
Q	Indonesia	0
Q	South Korea	0
Czechoslovakia	3
Italy	3
Q	Finland	0
Q	Dominican Republic	0
Great Britain	3
Japan	3
Q	China	0
Q	Bulgaria	0
Austria	3
Germany	2
Argentina	1
Netherlands	2
Switzerland	1
Q	Hong Kong	2
Hungary	1
Brazil	0
Soviet Union	3
New Zealand	3
Q	Greece	0
France	3
Q	Chinese Taipei	0
Q	Israel	2
Q	Denmark	1
Canada	1
Spain	2

Second Round
United States	3
Belgium	0
Australia	1
Czechoslovakia	2
Italy	1
Great Britain	2
Japan	1
Austria	2
Germany	1
Netherlands	2
Q	Hong Kong	0
Soviet Union	3
New Zealand	0
France	3
Q	Israel	0
Spain	3

Quarterfinals
United States	2
Czechoslovakia	1
Great Britain	1
Austria	2
Netherlands	1
Soviet Union	2
France	0
Spain	3

Semifinals
United States	3
Austria	0
Soviet Union	2
Spain	1

Final
United States	2
Soviet Union	1

1st Round losing teams play in Consolation Rounds

=== First round ===
==== United States vs. Poland ====
United States
3
Peachtree World of Tennis, Norcross, Georgia, United States
July 1990
Hard (outdoors)

Poland
0

			1	2	3
1	(United States) (Poland)	Jennifer Capriati; Magdalena Feistel	6; 3	6; 1
2	(United States) (Poland)	Zina Garrison-Jackson; Katarzyna Nowak	6; 0	6; 1
3	(United States) (Poland)	Gigi Fernández / Zina Garrison-Jackson; Magdalena Feistel / Renata Skrzypczyńska	6; 0	6; 0

==== Sweden vs. Belgium ====
Sweden
1
Peachtree World of Tennis, Norcross, Georgia, United States
July 1990
Hard (outdoors)

Belgium
2

			1	2	3
1	(Sweden) (Belgium)	Maria Strandlund; Sandra Wasserman	4; 6	4; 6
2	(Sweden) (Belgium)	Catarina Lindqvist; Sabine Appelmans	7; 5	7; 5
3	(Sweden) (Belgium)	Catarina Lindqvist / Maria Strandlund; Sabine Appelmans / Sandra Wasserman	2; 6	2; 6

==== Australia vs. Indonesia ====
Australia
2
Peachtree World of Tennis, Norcross, Georgia, United States
July 1990
Hard (outdoors)

Indonesia
0

			1	2	3
1	(Australia) (Indonesia)	Elizabeth Smylie; Suzanna Anggarkusuma	5; 7	6; 4	6; 0
2	(Australia) (Indonesia)	Rachel McQuillan; Yayuk Basuki	6; 3	3; 6	6; 3
3	(Australia) (Indonesia)					not played

==== South Korea vs. Czechoslovakia ====
South Korea
0
Peachtree World of Tennis, Norcross, Georgia, United States
July 1990
Hard (outdoors)

Czechoslovakia
3

			1	2	3
1	(South Korea) (Czechoslovakia)	Park Mal-sim; Regina Rajchrtová	4; 6	1; 6
2	(South Korea) (Czechoslovakia)	Im Sook-ja; Jana Novotná	1; 6	0; 6
3	(South Korea) (Czechoslovakia)	Kim Il-soon / Lee Jeong-myung; Regina Rajchrtová / Eva Švíglerová	2; 6	3; 6

==== Italy vs. Finland ====
Italy
3
Peachtree World of Tennis, Norcross, Georgia, United States
July 1990
Hard (outdoors)

Finland
0

			1	2	3
1	(Italy) (Finland)	Cathy Caverzasio; Petra Thorén	6; 2	6; 3
2	(Italy) (Finland)	Raffaella Reggi; Nanne Dahlman	6; 2	6; 2
3	(Italy) (Finland)	Laura Golarsa / Raffaella Reggi; Anne Aallonen / Petra Thorén	6; 2	6; 3

==== Dominican Republic vs. Great Britain ====
Dominican Republic
0
Peachtree World of Tennis, Norcross, Georgia, United States
July 1990
Hard (outdoors)

Great Britain
3

			1	2	3
1	(Dominican Republic) (United Kingdom)	Joelle Schad; Monique Javer	2; 6	3; 6
2	(Dominican Republic) (United Kingdom)	Madeleine Sánchez; Sarah Loosemore	2; 6	1; 6
3	(Dominican Republic) (United Kingdom)	Madeleine Sánchez / Joelle Schad; Jo Durie / Clare Wood	2; 6	0; 6

==== Japan vs. China ====
Japan
3
Peachtree World of Tennis, Norcross, Georgia, United States
July 1990
Hard (outdoors)

China
0

			1	2	3
1	(Japan) (China)	Kimiko Date; Li Fang	6; 3	6; 0
2	(Japan) (China)	Naoko Sawamatsu; Tang Min	6; 2	6; 0
3	(Japan) (China)	Maya Kidowaki / Nana Miyagi; Li Fang / Tang Min	6; 1	6; 1

==== Bulgaria vs. Austria ====
Bulgaria
0
Peachtree World of Tennis, Norcross, Georgia, United States
July 1990
Hard (outdoors)

Austria
3

			1	2	3
1	(Bulgaria) (Austria)	Dora Rangelova; Barbara Paulus	2; 6	3; 6
2	(Bulgaria) (Austria)	Elena Pampoulova; Judith Wiesner	0; 6	0; 6
3	(Bulgaria) (Austria)	Galia Angelova / Dora Rangelova; Barbara Paulus / Judith Wiesner	0; 6	2; 6

==== Germany vs. Argentina ====
Germany
2
Peachtree World of Tennis, Norcross, Georgia, United States
July 1990
Hard (outdoors)

Argentina
1

			1	2	3
1	(Germany) (Argentina)	Anke Huber; Bettina Fulco	6; 1	6; 2
2	(Germany) (Argentina)	Claudia Porwik; Florencia Labat	6; 0	6; 3
3	(Germany) (Argentina)	Isabel Cueto / Wiltrud Probst; Bettina Fulco / Florencia Labat	4; 6	2; 6

==== Netherlands vs. Switzerland ====
Netherlands
2
Peachtree World of Tennis, Norcross, Georgia, United States
July 1990
Hard (outdoors)

Switzerland
1

			1	2	3
1	(Netherlands) (Switzerland)	Brenda Schultz; Csilla Cserépy	7^{7} 6^{4}	6; 0
2	(Netherlands) (Switzerland)	Manon Bollegraf; Emanuela Zardo	7^{7} 6^{5}	5; 7	2; 6
3	(Netherlands) (Switzerland)	Manon Bollegraf / Brenda Schultz; Céline Cohen / Eva Krapl	6; 0	6; 1

==== Hong Kong vs. Hungary ====
Hong Kong
2
Peachtree World of Tennis, Norcross, Georgia, United States
July 1990
Hard (outdoors)

Hungary
1

			1	2	3
1	(Hong Kong) (Hungary)	Ellinore Lightbody; Andrea Noszály	7^{7} 6^{4}	7; 5
2	(Hong Kong) (Hungary)	Paulette Moreno; Andrea Temesvári	6; 0	6; 1
3	(Hong Kong) (Hungary)	Ellinore Lightbody / Pang Sheung; Andrea Noszály / Réka Szikszay	2; 6	4; 6

==== Brazil vs. Soviet Union ====
Brazil
0
Peachtree World of Tennis, Norcross, Georgia, United States
July 1990
Hard (outdoors)

Soviet Union
3

			1	2	3
1	(Brazil) (Soviet Union)	Andrea Vieira; Leila Meskhi	7^{7} 6^{4}	1; 6	2; 6
2	(Brazil) (Soviet Union)	Cláudia Chabalgoity; Natasha Zvereva	0; 6	1; 6
3	(Brazil) (Soviet Union)	Cláudia Chabalgoity / Luciana Corsato; Larisa Neiland / Natasha Zvereva	2; 6	1; 6

==== New Zealand vs. Greece ====
New Zealand
3
Peachtree World of Tennis, Norcross, Georgia, United States
July 1990
Hard (outdoors)

Greece
0

			1	2	3
1	(New Zealand) (Greece)	Claudine Toleafoa; Olga Tsarbopoulou	6; 3	7^{7} 6^{5}
2	(New Zealand) (Greece)	Belinda Cordwell; Angeliki Kanellopoulou	7; 5	6; 3
3	(New Zealand) (Greece)	Belinda Cordwell / Julie Richardson; Angeliki Kanellopoulou / Olga Tsarbopoulou	6; 1	6; 0

==== France vs. Chinese Taipei ====
France
3
Peachtree World of Tennis, Norcross, Georgia, United States
July 1990
Hard (outdoors)

Chinese Taipei
0

			1	2	3
1	(France) (Chinese Taipei)	Julie Halard; Lai Su-lin	6; 2	6; 1
2	(France) (Chinese Taipei)	Nathalie Tauziat; Wang Shi-ting	6; 3	6; 2
3	(France) (Chinese Taipei)	Isabelle Demongeot / Mary Pierce; Lai Su-lin / Lin Ya-hui	6; 2	6; 2

==== Israel vs. Denmark ====
Israel
2
Peachtree World of Tennis, Norcross, Georgia, United States
July 1990
Hard (outdoors)

Denmark
1

			1	2	3
1	(Israel) (Denmark)	Ilana Berger; Sofie Albinus	6; 3	6; 3
2	(Israel) (Denmark)	Yael Segal; Tine Scheuer-Larsen	2; 6	6; 4	5; 7
3	(Israel) (Denmark)	Ilana Berger / Limor Zaltz; Sofie Albinus / Tine Scheuer-Larsen	6; 3	6; 2

==== Canada vs. Spain ====
Canada
1
Peachtree World of Tennis, Norcross, Georgia, United States
July 1990
Hard (outdoors)

Spain
2

			1	2	3
1	(Canada) (Spain)	Jill Hetherington; Conchita Martínez	1; 6	4; 6
2	(Canada) (Spain)	Helen Kelesi; Arantxa Sánchez Vicario	3; 6	2; 6
3	(Canada) (Spain)	Jill Hetherington / Rene Simpson; Conchita Martínez / Pilar Pérez	5; 7	6; 2	6; 2

=== Second round ===
==== United States vs. Belgium ====
United States
3
Peachtree World of Tennis, Norcross, Georgia, United States
July 1990
Hard (outdoors)

Belgium
0

			1	2	3
1	(United States) (Belgium)	Jennifer Capriati; Sandra Wasserman	6; 0	7^{13} 6^{11}
2	(United States) (Belgium)	Zina Garrison-Jackson; Sabine Appelmans	6; 4	6; 1
3	(United States) (Belgium)	Gigi Fernández / Zina Garrison-Jackson; Sabine Appelmans / Sandra Wasserman	6; 1	6; 3

==== Australia vs. Czechoslovakia ====
Australia
1
Peachtree World of Tennis, Norcross, Georgia, United States
July 1990
Hard (outdoors)

Czechoslovakia
2

			1	2	3
1	(Australia) (Czechoslovakia)	Elizabeth Smylie; Regina Rajchrtová	4; 6	4; 6
2	(Australia) (Czechoslovakia)	Rachel McQuillan; Jana Novotná	4; 6	4; 6
3	(Australia) (Czechoslovakia)	Kristin Godridge / Janine Tremelling; Regina Rajchrtová / Eva Švíglerová	6; 2	6; 3

==== Italy vs. Great Britain ====
Italy
1
Peachtree World of Tennis, Norcross, Georgia, United States
July 1990
Hard (outdoors)

Great Britain
2

			1	2	3
1	(Italy) (United Kingdom)	Laura Golarsa; Monique Javer	6; 2	6; 2
2	(Italy) (United Kingdom)	Raffaella Reggi; Sarah Loosemore	6; 2	5; 7	5; 7
3	(Italy) (United Kingdom)	Laura Golarsa / Raffaella Reggi; Jo Durie / Clare Wood	4; 6	1; 6

==== Japan vs. Austria ====
Japan
1
Peachtree World of Tennis, Norcross, Georgia, United States
July 1990
Hard (outdoors)

Austria
2

			1	2	3
1	(Japan) (Austria)	Kimiko Date; Barbara Paulus	3; 6	6^{5} 7^{7}
2	(Japan) (Austria)	Naoko Sawamatsu; Judith Wiesner	2; 6	6^{2} 7^{7}
3	(Japan) (Austria)	Maya Kidowaki / Nana Miyagi; Barbara Paulus / Beate Reinstadler	6; 0	6; 0

==== Germany vs. Netherlands ====
Germany
1
Peachtree World of Tennis, Norcross, Georgia, United States
July 1990
Hard (outdoors)

Netherlands
2

			1	2	3
1	(Germany) (Netherlands)	Anke Huber; Brenda Schultz	3; 6	2; 6
2	(Germany) (Netherlands)	Claudia Porwik; Manon Bollegraf	6; 2	6; 4
3	(Germany) (Netherlands)	Claudia Porwik / Wiltrud Probst; Manon Bollegraf / Brenda Schultz	6^{5} 7^{7}	6^{2} 7^{7}

==== Hong Kong vs. Soviet Union ====
Hong Kong
0
Peachtree World of Tennis, Norcross, Georgia, United States
July 1990
Hard (outdoors)

Soviet Union
3

			1	2	3
1	(Hong Kong) (Soviet Union)	Ellinore Lightbody; Larisa Neiland	3; 6	1; 6
2	(Hong Kong) (Soviet Union)	Paulette Moreno; Natasha Zvereva	3; 6	6^{1} 7^{7}
3	(Hong Kong) (Soviet Union)	Paulette Moreno / Pang Sheung; Larisa Neiland / Natasha Zvereva	3; 6	0; 6

==== New Zealand vs. France ====
New Zealand
0
Peachtree World of Tennis, Norcross, Georgia, United States
July 1990
Hard (outdoors)

France
3

			1	2	3
1	(New Zealand) (France)	Claudine Toleafoa; Julie Halard	2; 6	5; 7
2	(New Zealand) (France)	Belinda Cordwell; Nathalie Tauziat	1; 6	2; 6
3	(New Zealand) (France)	Belinda Cordwell / Julie Richardson; Isabelle Demongeot / Mary Pierce	3; 6	4; 6

==== Israel vs. Spain ====
Israel
0
Peachtree World of Tennis, Norcross, Georgia, United States
July 1990
Hard (outdoors)

Spain
3

			1	2	3
1	(Israel) (Spain)	Ilana Berger; Conchita Martínez	3; 6	2; 6
2	(Israel) (Spain)	Yael Segal; Arantxa Sánchez Vicario	0; 6	0; 6
3	(Israel) (Spain)	Ilana Berger / Limor Zaltz; Conchita Martínez / Arantxa Sánchez Vicario	3; 6	4; 6

=== Quarterfinals ===
==== United States vs. Czechoslovakia ====
United States
2
Peachtree World of Tennis, Norcross, Georgia, United States
July 1990
Hard (outdoors)

Czechoslovakia
1

			1	2	3
1	(United States) (Czechoslovakia)	Jennifer Capriati; Regina Rajchrtová	6; 2	7^{7} 6^{4}
2	(United States) (Czechoslovakia)	Zina Garrison-Jackson; Jana Novotná	3; 6	3; 6
3	(United States) (Czechoslovakia)	Gigi Fernández / Zina Garrison-Jackson; Jana Novotná / Regina Rajchrtová	7^{10} 6^{8}	6; 4

==== Great Britain vs. Austria ====
Great Britain
1
Peachtree World of Tennis, Norcross, Georgia, United States
July 1990
Hard (outdoors)

Austria
2

			1	2	3
1	(United Kingdom) (Austria)	Jo Durie; Barbara Paulus	6^{3} 7^{7}	7; 5	4; 6
2	(United Kingdom) (Austria)	Sarah Loosemore; Judith Wiesner	6^{4} 7^{7}	6; 2	6; 8
3	(United Kingdom) (Austria)	Jo Durie / Clare Wood; Barbara Paulus / Beate Reinstadler	5; 2			retired

==== Netherlands vs. Soviet Union ====
Netherlands
1
Peachtree World of Tennis, Norcross, Georgia, United States
July 1990
Hard (outdoors)

Soviet Union
2

			1	2	3
1	(Netherlands) (Soviet Union)	Brenda Schultz; Leila Meskhi	6^{1} 7^{7}	6; 4	6; 3
2	(Netherlands) (Soviet Union)	Manon Bollegraf; Natasha Zvereva	1; 6	3; 6
3	(Netherlands) (Soviet Union)	Manon Bollegraf / Brenda Schultz; Larisa Neiland / Natasha Zvereva	6^{7} 7^{9}	3; 6

==== France vs. Spain ====
France
0
Peachtree World of Tennis, Norcross, Georgia, United States
July 1990
Hard (outdoors)

Spain
3

			1	2	3
1	(France) (Spain)	Julie Halard; Conchita Martínez	0; 6	3; 6
2	(France) (Spain)	Nathalie Tauziat; Arantxa Sánchez Vicario	6^{9} 7^{11}	1; 6
3	(France) (Spain)	Isabelle Demongeot / Mary Pierce; Conchita Martínez / Arantxa Sánchez Vicario	4; 6	4; 6

=== Semifinals ===
==== United States vs. Austria ====
United States
3
Peachtree World of Tennis, Norcross, Georgia, United States
July 1990
Hard (outdoors)

Austria
0

			1	2	3
1	(United States) (Austria)	Jennifer Capriati; Barbara Paulus	6; 3	6; 4
2	(United States) (Austria)	Zina Garrison-Jackson; Judith Wiesner	6; 3	6; 4
3	(United States) (Austria)	Patty Fendick / Zina Garrison-Jackson; Barbara Paulus / Judith Wiesner	6; 1	7^{7} 6^{5}

==== Soviet Union vs. Spain ====
Soviet Union
2
Peachtree World of Tennis, Norcross, Georgia, United States
July 1990
Hard (outdoors)

Spain
1

			1	2	3
1	(Soviet Union) (Spain)	Leila Meskhi; Conchita Martínez	3; 6	5; 7
2	(Soviet Union) (Spain)	Natasha Zvereva; Arantxa Sánchez Vicario	6; 4	2; 0		retired
3	(Soviet Union) (Spain)	Larisa Neiland / Natasha Zvereva; Conchita Martínez / Pilar Pérez	6; 2	6; 3

=== Final ===
==== United States vs. Soviet Union ====
United States
2
Peachtree World of Tennis, Norcross, Georgia, United States
29 July 1990
Hard (outdoors)

Soviet Union
1

			1	2	3
1	(United States) (Soviet Union)	Jennifer Capriati; Leila Meskhi	7^{7} 6^{3}	6; 2
2	(United States) (Soviet Union)	Zina Garrison-Jackson; Natasha Zvereva	6; 4	3; 6	3; 6
3	(United States) (Soviet Union)	Gigi Fernández / Zina Garrison-Jackson; Larisa Neiland / Natasha Zvereva	6; 4	6; 3

1990 Federation Cup Champions
(United States)
United States
Fourteenth title

== Consolation ==
=== Qualifying round ===
Winning team	Score	Losing team
Uruguay	2–1	Thailand
Philippines	3–0	Jamaica
Norway	3–0	Malta
Luxembourg	3–0	Sri Lanka
Mexico	3–0	Trinidad and Tobago
Ireland	2–0	Malaysia
Yugoslavia	3–0	Bahamas

Winning teams advance to Consolation Main Draw

==== Uruguay vs. Thailand ====
Uruguay
2
Peachtree World of Tennis, Norcross, Georgia, United States
July 1990
Hard (outdoors)

Thailand
1

			1	2	3
1	(Uruguay) (Thailand)	Laura Olave; Roongnapha Surachet	7^{7} 6^{4}	6; 2
2	(Uruguay) (Thailand)	Patricia Miller; Chanrisa Rareang	6; 3	6; 3
3	(Uruguay) (Thailand)	Claudia Brause / Helga Grille; Tossaporn Summa / Orawan Thampensri	6; 3	4; 6	1; 6

==== Philippines vs. Jamaica ====
Philippines
3
Peachtree World of Tennis, Norcross, Georgia, United States
July 1990
Hard (outdoors)

Jamaica
0

			1	2	3
1	(Philippines) (Jamaica)	Jennifer Saret; Camille Walter	7^{7} 6^{2}	6; 0
2	(Philippines) (Jamaica)	Sarah Castillejo; Joni Van Ryck De Groot	7; 5	1; 6	6; 2
3	(Philippines) (Jamaica)	Dyan Castillejo / Jennifer Saret; Henrietta Harris / Joni Van Ryck De Groot	6; 1	6; 1

==== Norway vs. Malta ====
Norway
3
Peachtree World of Tennis, Norcross, Georgia, United States
July 1990
Hard (outdoors)

Malta
0

			1	2	3
1	(Norway) (Malta)	Cathrine Instebø; Elexia Stivala	6; 0	6; 1
2	(Norway) (Malta)	Amy Jönsson Raaholt; Carol Cassar-Torreggiani	6; 0	6; 2
3	(Norway) (Malta)	Amy Jönsson Raaholt / Astrid Sunde; Katherine Camilleri / Carol Cassar-Torreggiani	6; 2	6; 3

==== Luxembourg vs. Sri Lanka ====
Luxembourg
3
Peachtree World of Tennis, Norcross, Georgia, United States
July 1990
Hard (outdoors)

Sri Lanka
0

			1	2	3
1	(Luxembourg) (Sri Lanka)	Marie-Christine Goy; Vajira Premaratne	6; 1	6; 1
2	(Luxembourg) (Sri Lanka)	Karin Kschwendt; Lihini Weerasuriya	6; 0	6; 0
3	(Luxembourg) (Sri Lanka)	Marie-Christine Goy / Pascale Welter; Sobhini De Silva / Lihini Weerasuriya	6; 1	6; 4

==== Mexico vs. Trinidad and Tobago ====
Mexico
3
Peachtree World of Tennis, Norcross, Georgia, United States
July 1990
Hard (outdoors)

Trinidad and Tobago
0

			1	2	3
1	(Mexico) (Trinidad and Tobago)	Claudia Hernández; Marianne Ward	6; 1	6; 1
2	(Mexico) (Trinidad and Tobago)	Angélica Gavaldón; Beverly Corbie	4; 1	3; 1
3	(Mexico) (Trinidad and Tobago)	Angélica Gavaldón / Lupita Novelo; Beverly Corbie / Donna Millington	6; 0	6; 1

==== Ireland vs. Malaysia ====
Ireland
2
Peachtree World of Tennis, Norcross, Georgia, United States
July 1990
Hard (outdoors)

Malaysia
0

			1	2	3
1	(Republic of Ireland) (Malaysia)	Siobhán Nicholson; Leena Singarajah	6; 0	6; 0
2	(Republic of Ireland) (Malaysia)	Lesley O'Halloran; Kerry Anne Lim	6; 0	6; 2
3	(Republic of Ireland) (Malaysia)					not played

==== Yugoslavia vs. Bahamas ====
Yugoslavia
3
Peachtree World of Tennis, Norcross, Georgia, United States
July 1990
Hard (outdoors)

Bahamas
0

			1	2	3
1	(Socialist Federal Republic of Yugoslavia) (The Bahamas)	Gorana Matić; Robyn Farrington	6; 0	6; 0
2	(Socialist Federal Republic of Yugoslavia) (The Bahamas)	Nadin Ercegović; Kim Cartwright	6; 2	6; 2
3	(Socialist Federal Republic of Yugoslavia) (The Bahamas)	Nadin Ercegović / Gorana Matić; Robyn Farrington / Kim Cartwright	6; 2	6; 1

=== Main draw ===
Consolation First Round
South Korea	1
Indonesia	2
Q	Philippines	0
Venezuela	3
Greece	0
Q	Yugoslavia	2
Q	Norway	0
Bulgaria	3
Q	Ireland	1
Chinese Taipei	2
Dominican Republic	1
Poland	2
Q	Uruguay	0
China	2
Denmark	1
Q	Luxembourg	2

Consolation Second Round
Canada	1
Indonesia	2
Q	Mexico	3
Venezuela	0
Switzerland	3
Q	Yugoslavia	0
Brazil	2
Bulgaria	1
Chinese Taipei	1
Finland	2
Poland	0
Argentina	3
China	1
Hungary	2
Q	Luxembourg	2
Sweden	1

Consolation Quarterfinals
Indonesia	2
Q	Mexico	1
Switzerland	3
Brazil	0
Finland	0
Argentina	3
Hungary	2
Q	Luxembourg	1

Consolation Semifinals
Indonesia	2
Switzerland	1
Argentina	1
Hungary	2

Consolation Final
Indonesia	2
Hungary	1

=== First round ===
==== South Korea vs. Indonesia ====
South Korea
1
Peachtree World of Tennis, Norcross, Georgia, United States
July 1990
Hard (outdoors)

Indonesia
2

			1	2	3
1	(South Korea) (Indonesia)	Park Mal-sim; Suzanna Anggarkusuma	6; 3	3; 6	6; 0
2	(South Korea) (Indonesia)	Kim Il-soon; Yayuk Basuki	2; 6	6^{3} 7^{7}
3	(South Korea) (Indonesia)	Kim Il-soon / Lee Jeong-myung; Yayuk Basuki / Suzanna Anggarkusuma	7; 5	3; 6	0; 6

==== Philippines vs. Venezuela ====
Philippines
3
Peachtree World of Tennis, Norcross, Georgia, United States
July 1990
Hard (outdoors)

Venezuela
0

			1	2	3
1	(Philippines) (Venezuela)	Jennifer Saret; Emily Leonardi	0; 6	0; 6
2	(Philippines) (Venezuela)	Sarah Castillejo; Eleonora Vegliante	2; 6	4; 6
3	(Philippines) (Venezuela)	Dyan Castillejo / Jennifer Saret; Emily Leonardi / María Vento	4; 6	3; 6

==== Greece vs. Yugoslavia ====
Greece
2
Peachtree World of Tennis, Norcross, Georgia, United States
July 1990
Hard (outdoors)

Yugoslavia
1

			1	2	3
1	(Greece) (Socialist Federal Republic of Yugoslavia)	Christina Zachariadou; Gorana Matić	3; 6	3; 6
2	(Greece) (Socialist Federal Republic of Yugoslavia)	Olga Tsarbopoulou; Nadin Ercegović	1; 6	5; 7
3	(Greece) (Socialist Federal Republic of Yugoslavia)					not played

==== Norway vs. Bulgaria ====
Norway
0
Peachtree World of Tennis, Norcross, Georgia, United States
July 1990
Hard (outdoors)

Bulgaria
3

			1	2	3
1	(Norway) (Bulgaria)	Cathrine Instebø; Galia Angelova	2; 6	6; 2	2; 6
2	(Norway) (Bulgaria)	Amy Jönsson Raaholt; Elena Pampoulova	4; 6	3; 6
3	(Norway) (Bulgaria)	Amy Jönsson Raaholt / Astrid Sunde; Elena Pampoulova / Dora Rangelova	6; 4	2; 6	3; 6

==== Ireland vs. Chinese Taipei ====
Ireland
1
Peachtree World of Tennis, Norcross, Georgia, United States
July 1990
Hard (outdoors)

Chinese Taipei
2

			1	2	3
1	(Republic of Ireland) (Chinese Taipei)	Jennifer Thornton; Lai Su-lin	5; 7	6; 3	6; 1
2	(Republic of Ireland) (Chinese Taipei)	Siobhán Nicholson; Wang Shi-ting	5; 7	4; 6
3	(Republic of Ireland) (Chinese Taipei)	Siobhán Nicholson / Lesley O'Halloran; Lai Su-lin / Wang Shi-ting	2; 6	0; 6

==== Dominican Republic vs. Poland ====
Dominican Republic
1
Peachtree World of Tennis, Norcross, Georgia, United States
July 1990
Hard (outdoors)

Poland
2

			1	2	3
1	(Dominican Republic) (Poland)	Joelle Schad; Magdalena Feistel	6; 3	7^{7} 6^{4}
2	(Dominican Republic) (Poland)	Madeleine Sánchez; Katarzyna Nowak	2; 6	5; 7
3	(Dominican Republic) (Poland)	Madeleine Sánchez / Joelle Schad; Magdalena Feistel / Renata Skrzypczyńska	3; 6	4; 6

==== Uruguay vs. China ====
Uruguay
0
Peachtree World of Tennis, Norcross, Georgia, United States
July 1990
Hard (outdoors)

China
2

			1	2	3
1	(Uruguay) (China)	Laura Olave; Li Fang	3; 6	0; 6
2	(Uruguay) (China)	Patricia Miller; Tang Min	6^{7} 7^{9}	0; 6
3	(Uruguay) (China)					not played

==== Denmark vs. Luxembourg ====
Denmark
1
Peachtree World of Tennis, Norcross, Georgia, United States
July 1990
Hard (outdoors)

Luxembourg
2

			1	2	3
1	(Denmark) (Luxembourg)	Karin Ptaszek; Marie-Christine Goy	6; 3	1; 6	6; 2
2	(Denmark) (Luxembourg)	Tine Scheuer-Larsen; Karin Kschwendt	2; 6	0; 1		retired
3	(Denmark) (Luxembourg)	Sofie Albinus / Merete Balling-Stockmann; Marie-Christine Goy / Karin Kschwendt	1; 6	3; 6

=== Second round ===
==== Canada vs. Indonesia ====
Canada
1
Peachtree World of Tennis, Norcross, Georgia, United States
July 1990
Hard (outdoors)

Indonesia
2

			1	2	3
1	(Canada) (Indonesia)	Jill Hetherington; Suzanna Anggarkusuma	3; 6	7^{7} 6^{2}	2; 6
2	(Canada) (Indonesia)	Rene Simpson; Yayuk Basuki	7; 5	6; 1
3	(Canada) (Indonesia)	Jill Hetherington / Rene Simpson; Yayuk Basuki / Suzanna Anggarkusuma	4; 6	2; 6

==== Mexico vs. Venezuela ====
Mexico
3
Peachtree World of Tennis, Norcross, Georgia, United States
July 1990
Hard (outdoors)

Venezuela
0

			1	2	3
1	(Mexico) (Venezuela)	Claudia Hernández; Emily Leonardi	6; 4	6; 4
2	(Mexico) (Venezuela)	Angélica Gavaldón; Eleonora Vegliante	6; 1	6; 1
3	(Mexico) (Venezuela)	Angélica Gavaldón / Claudia Hernández; Eleonora Vegliante / María Vento	6; 3	6; 3

==== Switzerland vs. Yugoslavia ====
Switzerland
3
Peachtree World of Tennis, Norcross, Georgia, United States
July 1990
Hard (outdoors)

Yugoslavia
0

			1	2	3
1	(Switzerland) (Socialist Federal Republic of Yugoslavia)	Csilla Cserépy; Gorana Matić	6; 2	6; 4
2	(Switzerland) (Socialist Federal Republic of Yugoslavia)	Emanuela Zardo; Nadin Ercegović	6; 0	6; 0
3	(Switzerland) (Socialist Federal Republic of Yugoslavia)	Eva Krapl / Emanuela Zardo; Nadin Ercegović / Gorana Matić	6; 0	6; 4

==== Brazil vs. Bulgaria ====
Brazil
2
Peachtree World of Tennis, Norcross, Georgia, United States
July 1990
Hard (outdoors)

Bulgaria
1

			1	2	3
1	(Brazil) (Bulgaria)	Andrea Vieira; Dora Rangelova	7; 5	6; 1
2	(Brazil) (Bulgaria)	Cláudia Chabalgoity; Elena Pampoulova	6; 2	2; 6	6; 4
3	(Brazil) (Bulgaria)	Luciana Corsato / Andrea Vieira; Galia Angelova / Dora Rangelova	5; 7	4; 6

==== Chinese Taipei vs. Finland ====
Chinese Taipei
1
Peachtree World of Tennis, Norcross, Georgia, United States
July 1990
Hard (outdoors)

Finland
2

			1	2	3
1	(Chinese Taipei) (Finland)	Lai Su-lin; Petra Thorén	0; 6	0; 6
2	(Chinese Taipei) (Finland)	Wang Shi-ting; Nanne Dahlman	6; 2	7; 5
3	(Chinese Taipei) (Finland)	Lai Su-lin / Wang Shi-ting; Anne Aallonen / Nanne Dahlman	5; 7	1; 6

==== Poland vs. Argentina ====
Poland
0
Peachtree World of Tennis, Norcross, Georgia, United States
July 1990
Hard (outdoors)

Argentina
3

			1	2	3
1	(Poland) (Argentina)	Magdalena Feistel; Bettina Fulco	0; 6	2; 6
2	(Poland) (Argentina)	Katarzyna Nowak; Florencia Labat	2; 6	7; 5	0; 6
3	(Poland) (Argentina)	Magdalena Feistel / Renata Skrzypczyńska; Bettina Fulco / Inés Gorrochategui	3; 6	2; 6

==== China vs. Hungary ====
China
1
Peachtree World of Tennis, Norcross, Georgia, United States
July 1990
Hard (outdoors)

Hungary
2

			1	2	3
1	(China) (Hungary)	Li Fang; Réka Szikszay	1; 6	6; 4	6; 2
2	(China) (Hungary)	Tang Min; Andrea Temesvári	4; 6	2; 6
3	(China) (Hungary)	Li Fang / Tang Min; Réka Szikszay / Andrea Temesvári	2; 6	7; 5	1; 6

==== Luxembourg vs. Sweden ====
Luxembourg
2
Peachtree World of Tennis, Norcross, Georgia, United States
July 1990
Hard (outdoors)

Sweden
1

			1	2	3
1	(Luxembourg) (Sweden)	Marie-Christine Goy; Cecilia Dahlman	3; 6	1; 6
2	(Luxembourg) (Sweden)	Karin Kschwendt; Catarina Lindqvist	6; 4	6; 4
3	(Luxembourg) (Sweden)	Marie-Christine Goy / Karin Kschwendt; Cecilia Dahlman / Maria Strandlund	6; 2	1; 6	6; 3

=== Quarterfinals ===
==== Indonesia vs. Mexico ====
Indonesia
2
Peachtree World of Tennis, Norcross, Georgia, United States
July 1990
Hard (outdoors)

Mexico
1

			1	2	3
1	(Indonesia) (Mexico)	Suzanna Anggarkusuma; Claudia Hernández	6; 1	6; 3
2	(Indonesia) (Mexico)	Yayuk Basuki; Angélica Gavaldón	6; 4	7^{7} 6^{5}
3	(Indonesia) (Mexico)	Irawati Moerid / Lukky Tedjamukti; Aránzazu Gallardo / Lupita Novelo	3; 6	4; 6

==== Switzerland vs. Brazil ====
Switzerland
3
Peachtree World of Tennis, Norcross, Georgia, United States
July 1990
Hard (outdoors)

Brazil
0

			1	2	3
1	(Switzerland) (Brazil)	Csilla Cserépy; Andrea Vieira	6; 3	6; 4
2	(Switzerland) (Brazil)	Emanuela Zardo; Cláudia Chabalgoity	6; 1	6; 0
3	(Switzerland) (Brazil)	Eva Krapl / Emanuela Zardo; Cláudia Chabalgoity / Luciana Corsato	5; 7	7; 5	6; 2

==== Finland vs. Argentina ====
Finland
0
Peachtree World of Tennis, Norcross, Georgia, United States
July 1990
Hard (outdoors)

Argentina
3

			1	2	3
1	(Finland) (Argentina)	Petra Thorén; Bettina Fulco	2; 6	5; 7
2	(Finland) (Argentina)	Anne Aallonen; Florencia Labat	6; 4	1; 6	4; 6
3	(Finland) (Argentina)	Nanne Dahlman / Katja Kokko; Inés Gorrochategui / Florencia Labat	5; 7	4; 6

==== Hungary vs. Luxembourg ====
Hungary
2
Peachtree World of Tennis, Norcross, Georgia, United States
July 1990
Hard (outdoors)

Luxembourg
1

			1	2	3
1	(Hungary) (Luxembourg)	Réka Szikszay; Marie-Christine Goy	6; 2	6^{2} 7^{7}	6; 1
2	(Hungary) (Luxembourg)	Andrea Temesvári; Karin Kschwendt	3; 6	2; 6
3	(Hungary) (Luxembourg)	Réka Szikszay / Andrea Temesvári; Marie-Christine Goy / Karin Kschwendt	6; 3	6; 2

=== Semifinals ===
==== Indonesia vs. Switzerland ====
Indonesia
2
Peachtree World of Tennis, Norcross, Georgia, United States
July 1990
Hard (outdoors)

Switzerland
1

			1	2	3
1	(Indonesia) (Switzerland)	Suzanna Anggarkusuma; Csilla Cserépy	4; 6	4; 6
2	(Indonesia) (Switzerland)	Yayuk Basuki; Emanuela Zardo	6; 2	6; 4
3	(Indonesia) (Switzerland)	Yayuk Basuki / Suzanna Anggarkusuma; Csilla Cserépy / Eva Krapl	6; 3	6; 2

==== Argentina vs. Hungary ====
Argentina
1
Peachtree World of Tennis, Norcross, Georgia, United States
July 1990
Hard (outdoors)

Hungary
2

			1	2	3
1	(Argentina) (Hungary)	Bettina Fulco; Réka Szikszay	6; 4	7; 5
2	(Argentina) (Hungary)	Florencia Labat; Andrea Temesvári	7^{8} 6^{6}	2; 6	3; 6
3	(Argentina) (Hungary)	Bettina Fulco / Inés Gorrochategui; Réka Szikszay / Andrea Temesvári	4; 6	1; 6

=== Final ===
==== Indonesia vs. Hungary ====
Indonesia
2
Peachtree World of Tennis, Norcross, Georgia, United States
July 1990
Hard (outdoors)

Hungary
1

			1	2	3
1	(Indonesia) (Hungary)	Suzanna Anggarkusuma; Réka Szikszay	6; 3	6; 1
2	(Indonesia) (Hungary)	Yayuk Basuki; Andrea Temesvári	6; 3	7^{7} 6^{5}
3	(Indonesia) (Hungary)	Irawati Moerid / Lukky Tedjamukti; Réka Szikszay / Andrea Temesvári	2; 6	1; 6
