= 1995 Fed Cup Asia/Oceania Zone =

Subsection of tennis competition

The Asia/Oceania Zone was one of three zones of regional competition in the 1995 Fed Cup.

== Group I ==
- Venue: Jang Choong Tennis Centre, Jung-gu, South Korea (outdoor clay)
- Date: 18–22 April

The eight teams were divided into two pools of four teams. The top two teams of each pool play-off in a two-round knockout stage to decide which nation progresses to World Group II play-offs. Nations finishing in the bottom place in each pool were relegated to Asia/Oceania Zone Group II for 1996.

=== Pools ===
	Pool A	KOR	THA	KAZ	NZL
1	South Korea (3–0)		3–0	3–0	3–0
2	Thailand (2–1)	0–3		3–0	2–1
3	Kazakhstan (1–2)	0–3	0–3		3–0
4	New Zealand (0–3)	0–3	1–2	0–3	

	Pool B	CHN	HKG	PHI	TPE
1	China (3–0)		3–0	3–0	3–0
2	Hong Kong (2–1)	0–3		2–1	2–1
3	Philippines (1–2)	0–3	1–2		2–1
4	Chinese Taipei (0–3)	0–3	1–2	1–2	

=== Knockout stage ===
Semifinals; 21 April
South Korea	3
Hong Kong	0
Thailand	1
China	2

Final; 22 April
South Korea	3
China	0

- South Korea advanced to World Group II Play-offs.
- New Zealand and Chinese Taipei relegated to Group II in 1996.

== Group II ==
- Venue: Maharashtra L.T.A., Mumbai, India (outdoor clay)
- Date: 8–11 March

The seven teams were divided into two pools of three and four. The top two teams from each pool then moved on to the play-off stage of the competition. The two teams that won one match from the play-off stage would advance to Group I for 1996.

=== Pools ===
	Pool A	UZB	SIN	SYR
1	Uzbekistan (2–0)		3–0	3–0
2	Singapore (1–1)	0–3		3–0
3	Syria (0–2)	0–3	0–3	

	Pool B	IND	MAS	SRI	POC
1	India (3–0)		2–1	2–1	3–0
2	Malaysia (2–1)	1–2		3–0	3–0
3	Sri Lanka (1–2)	1–2	0–3		3–0
4	Pacific Oceania (0–3)	0–3	0–3	0–3	

=== Play-offs ===
Winning team	Score	Losing team
Malaysia	3–0	Uzbekistan
India	3–0	Singapore

- Malaysia and India promoted to Asia/Oceania Group I in 1996.

== See also ==
- Fed Cup structure
