= 1995 Fed Cup Asia/Oceania Zone Group II – play-offs =

The play-offs of the 1995 Fed Cup Asia/Oceania Zone Group II were the final stages of the Group II Zonal Competition involving teams from Asia and Oceania. Those that qualified for this stage placed first and second in their respective pools.

Placing	Pool A	Pool B
1	Uzbekistan	India
2	Singapore	Malaysia
3	Syria	Sri Lanka
4		Pacific Oceania

The four teams were then paired up the team from a different placing of the other group for a play-off tie, with the winners being promoted to Group I in 1996.

== Uzbekistan vs. Malaysia ==
Uzbekistan
0
Maharashtra LTA, Mumbai, India
11 March 1995
Clay (outdoors)

Malaysia
3

			1	2	3
1	(Uzbekistan) (Malaysia)	Oksana Yarikova; Chiew Chern-Yi	1; 6	3; 6
2	(Uzbekistan) (Malaysia)	Svetlana Sinitsyna; Khoo Chin-Bee	6; 3	1; 6	3; 6
3	(Uzbekistan) (Malaysia)	Natalia Nikitina / Svetlana Zakharchenko; Chiew Chern-Yi / Liew Meang	6; 3	3; 6	3; 6

- Malaysia advanced to Group I in 1996, where they placed last in their pool of four and as such were relegated back to Group II for 1997.

== India vs. Singapore ==
India
3
Maharashtra LTA, Mumbai, India
11 March 1995
Clay (outdoors)

Singapore
0

			1	2	3
1	(India) (Singapore)	Manisha Malhotra; Leong Jil-Lin	6; 0	7^{7} 6^{2}
2	(India) (Singapore)	Nirupama Vaidyanathan; Lela Zainal	6; 0	6; 1
3	(India) (Singapore)	Manisha Malhotra / Nirupama Vaidyanathan; Dionne Lim / Lela Zainal	6; 1	6; 0

- India advanced to Group I in 1996, where they placed second in their pool of four.

== See also ==
- Fed Cup structure
