= 1994 Federation Cup Asia/Oceania Zone – Knockout Stage =

The Knockout Stage of the 1994 Federation Cup Asia/Oceania Zone was the final stage of the Zonal Competition involving teams from Asia and Oceania. Those that qualified for this stage placed first and second in their respective pools.

Placing	Pool A	Pool B
1	Philippines	Thailand
2	Chinese Taipei	New Zealand
3	India	Sri Lanka
4	Syria	Singapore

The four teams were then randomly drawn into a two-stage knockout tournament, with the winner qualifying for the World Group.

== Draw ==
Semifinals; 5 May
Philippines	1
New Zealand	2
Thailand	0
Chinese Taipei	3

Final; 6 May
New Zealand	1
Chinese Taipei	2

=== Semifinals ===
==== Philippines vs. New Zealand ====
Philippines
1
Delhi LTA Complex, New Delhi, India
5 May 1994
Clay (outdoors)

New Zealand
2

			1	2	3
1	(Philippines) (New Zealand)	Maricris Gentz; Amanda Trail	6; 1	6; 2
2	(Philippines) (New Zealand)	Francesca La'O; Claudine Toleafoa	3; 6	4; 6
3	(Philippines) (New Zealand)	Maricris Gentz / Francesca La'O; Claudine Toleafoa / Amanda Trail	6; 4	3; 6	5; 7

==== Thailand vs. Chinese Taipei ====
Thailand
0
Delhi LTA Complex, New Delhi, India
5 May 1994
Clay (outdoors)

Chinese Taipei
3

			1	2	3
1	(Thailand) (Chinese Taipei)	Suvimol Duangchan; Weng Tzu-ting	1; 6	1; 6
2	(Thailand) (Chinese Taipei)	Tamarine Tanasugarn; Wang Shi-ting	0; 6	6^{1} 7^{7}
3	(Thailand) (Chinese Taipei)	Pimpisamai Kansuthi / Benjamas Sangaram; Lin Ya-hui / Weng Tzu-ting	6^{2} 7^{7}	7; 5	3; 6

=== Final ===
==== New Zealand vs. Chinese Taipei ====
New Zealand
1
Delhi LTA Complex, New Delhi, India
6 May 1994
Clay (outdoors)

Chinese Taipei
2

			1	2	3
1	(New Zealand) (Chinese Taipei)	Amanda Trail; Weng Tzu-ting	1; 6	1; 6
2	(New Zealand) (Chinese Taipei)	Claudine Toleafoa; Wang Shi-ting	2; 6	1; 6
3	(New Zealand) (Chinese Taipei)	Claudine Toleafoa / Amanda Trail; Ho Chiu-mei / Lin Ya-hui	6; 2	7; 5

- Chinese Taipei advanced to the World Group, where they were defeated in the first round by Indonesia.

== See also ==
- Fed Cup structure
