= 1994 Federation Cup Asia/Oceania Zone =

The Asia/Oceania Zone was one of three zones of regional Federation Cup qualifying competition in 1994. All ties were played at the Delhi LTA Complex in New Delhi, India on clay courts.

The eight teams were divided into two pools of four to compete in round-robin matches. After each of the ties had been played, the teams that finished first and second in each of the respective pools would then move on to the knockout stage of the competition. The team that won both matches of the knockout stage would go on to advance to the World Group.

== Pool Stage ==
- Date: 2–4 May

	Pool A	PHI	TPE	IND	SYR
1	Philippines (3–0)		2–1	2–1	3–0
2	Chinese Taipei (2–1)	1–2		2–1	3–0
3	India (1–2)	1–2	1–2		3–0
4	Syria (0–3)	0–3	0–3	0–3	

	Pool B	THA	NZL	SRI	SIN
1	Thailand (3–0)		2–1	3–0	3–0
2	New Zealand (2–1)	1–2		2–1	3–0
3	Sri Lanka (1–2)	0–3	1–2		3–0
4	Singapore (0–3)	0–3	0–3	0–3	

- Teams finishing third and fourth in their group help form Asia/Oceania Zone Group II in 1995.

== Knockout stage ==
Semifinals; 5 May
Philippines	1
New Zealand	2
Thailand	0
Chinese Taipei	3

Final; 6 May
New Zealand	1
Chinese Taipei	2

- Chinese Taipei advanced to World Group.

== See also ==
- Fed Cup structure
