= 1995 Fed Cup Asia/Oceania Zone Group I – Pool A =

International tennis competition

Group A of the 1995 Fed Cup Asia/Oceania Zone Group I was one of two pools in the Asia/Oceania Zone Group I of the 1995 Fed Cup. Four teams competed in a round robin competition, with the top two teams advancing to the knockout stage and the bottom team being relegated down to Group II for 1996.

	(South Korea) KOR	(Thailand) THA	(Kazakhstan) KAZ	(New Zealand) NZL	RR; W–L	Set; W–L	Game; W–L	Standings
South Korea		3–0	3–0	3–0	3–0	18–1	112–38	1
Thailand	0–3		3–0	2–1	2–1	11–9	94–83	2
Kazakhstan	0–3	0–3		3–0	1–2	7–13	66–105	3
New Zealand	0–3	1–2	0–3		0–3	4–17	73–119	4

== South Korea vs. Thailand ==
South Korea
3
Jang Choong Tennis Centre, Jung-gu, South Korea
18 April 1995
Clay (outdoors)

Thailand
0

			1	2	3
1	(South Korea) (Thailand)	Choi Young-ja; Suvimol Duangchan	6; 0	6; 4
2	(South Korea) (Thailand)	Park Sung-hee; Tamarine Tanasugarn	6; 3	6; 1
3	(South Korea) (Thailand)	Choi Ju-yeon / Kim Eun-ha; Pimpisamai Kansuthi / Benjamas Sangaram	6; 1	6; 3

== Kazakhstan vs. New Zealand ==
Kazakhstan
3
Jang Choong Tennis Centre, Jung-gu, South Korea
18 April 1995
Clay (outdoors)

New Zealand
0

			1	2	3
1	(Kazakhstan) (New Zealand)	Irina Selyutina; Rachel Clark	6; 2	6; 0
2	(Kazakhstan) (New Zealand)	Tatiana Babina; Claudine Toleafoa	1; 6	7^{7} 6^{3}	7^{7} 6^{4}
3	(Kazakhstan) (New Zealand)	Tatiana Babina / Irina Selyutina; Rachel Clark / Shelley Stephens	6; 3	6; 4

== South Korea vs. Kazakhstan ==
South Korea
3
Jang Choong Tennis Centre, Jung-gu, South Korea
19 April 1995
Clay (outdoors)

Kazakhstan
0

			1	2	3
1	(South Korea) (Kazakhstan)	Choi Ju-yeon; Irina Selyutina	7; 5	6; 1
2	(South Korea) (Kazakhstan)	Park Sung-hee; Tatiana Babina	6; 0	6; 0
3	(South Korea) (Kazakhstan)	Choi Ju-yeon / Kim Eun-ha; Tatiana Babina / Irina Selyutina	6; 2	6; 2

== Thailand vs. New Zealand ==
Thailand
2
Jang Choong Tennis Centre, Jung-gu, South Korea
19 April 1995
Clay (outdoors)

New Zealand
1

			1	2	3
1	(Thailand) (New Zealand)	Suvimol Duangchan; Shelley Stephens	6; 4	6; 0
2	(Thailand) (New Zealand)	Tamarine Tanasugarn; Claudine Toleafoa	7^{10} 6^{8}	6; 1
3	(Thailand) (New Zealand)	Pimpisamai Kansuthi / Benjamas Sangaram; Rachel Clark / Shelley Stephens	4; 6	7^{8} 6^{6}	5; 7

== South Korea vs. New Zealand ==
South Korea
3
Jang Choong Tennis Centre, Jung-gu, South Korea
20 April 1995
Clay (outdoors)

New Zealand
0

			1	2	3
1	(South Korea) (New Zealand)	Kim Eun-ha; Shelley Stephens	6; 0	6; 0
2	(South Korea) (New Zealand)	Choi Ju-yeon; Claudine Toleafoa	3; 6	6; 4	6; 3
3	(South Korea) (New Zealand)	Choi Ju-yeon / Kim Eun-ha; Rachel Clark / Claudine Toleafoa	6; 3	6; 0

== Thailand vs. Kazakhstan ==
Thailand
3
Jang Choong Tennis Centre, Jung-gu, South Korea
20 April 1995
Clay (outdoors)

Kazakhstan
0

			1	2	3
1	(Thailand) (Kazakhstan)	Suvimol Duangchan; Irina Selyutina	6; 0	6; 2
2	(Thailand) (Kazakhstan)	Tamarine Tanasugarn; Tatiana Babina	5; 7	6; 1	6; 1
3	(Thailand) (Kazakhstan)	Suvimol Duangchan / Pimpisamai Kansuthi; Tatiana Babina / Irina Selyutina	6; 3	6; 3

- New Zealand placed last in the pool, and thus was relegated to Group II in 1996, where they achieved advancement back into Group I for 1997.

== See also ==
- Fed Cup structure
