= Iwalani McCalla =

Jamaican-American tennis player

- Country (sports): Jamaica
- Born: June 17, 1971 (age 54)
- Retired: 2002
- College: UCLA Bruins
- Prize money: $19,956

Singles
- Career record: 35–41
- Career titles: 0
- Highest ranking: No. 347 (21 August 1995)

Doubles
- Career record: 15–16
- Career titles: 1 ITF
- Highest ranking: No. 329 (24 July 1995)

Grand Slam doubles results
- US Open: 1R (1992)

Team competitions
- Fed Cup: 1–3

Iwalani McCalla (born June 17, 1971) is a Jamaican former professional tennis player.

McCalla has career-high WTA rankings of 347 in singles, achieved on 21 August 1995, and 329 in doubles, set on 24 July 1995. She has won 1 doubles titles on the ITF Women's Circuit. She played college tennis for the UCLA Bruins and partnered with Mamie Ceniza to win the NCAA doubles championship in her senior year in 1992. The pair received wildcards to the main draw of the 1992 US Open.

Playing for Jamaica at the Fed Cup, McCalla has accumulated a win–loss record of 1–3.

== ITF finals ==
$25,000 tournaments
$10,000 tournaments

=== Doubles: 2 (1–1) ===
Outcome	No.	Date	Tournament	Surface	Partner	Opponents	Score
Runner-up	1.	16 October 1994	Saltillo, Mexico	Hard	(Costa Rica) Paula Umaña	(United States) Laxmi Poruri (United States) Eleni Rossides	1–6, 1–6
Winner	1.	30 October 1995	Freeport, Bahamas	Hard	(United States) Rebecca Jensen	(United States) Claire Sessions Bailey (South Africa) Kim Grant	6–2, 6–4

== Fed Cup participation ==
=== Singles ===
Edition	Stage	Date	Location	Against	Surface	Opponent	W/L	Score
1991 Federation Cup	W/G	18 July 1991	Nottingham, United Kingdom	(Paraguay) Paraguay	Hard	(Paraguay) Rossana de los Ríos	L	3–6, 6–7
1991 Federation Cup	C/R	19 July 1991	Nottingham, United Kingdom	(Philippines) Philippines	Hard	(Philippines) Jennifer Saret	W	6–4, 7–5

=== Doubles ===
Edition	Stage	Date	Location	Against	Surface	Partner	Opponents	W/L	Score
1991 Federation Cup	W/G	18 July 1991	Nottingham, United Kingdom	(Paraguay) Paraguay	Hard	(Jamaica) Joni Van Ryck De Groot	(Paraguay) Rossana de los Ríos (Paraguay) Larissa Schaerer	L	4–6, 5–7
1991 Federation Cup	C/R	19 July 1991	Nottingham, United Kingdom	(Philippines) Philippines	Hard	(Jamaica) Joni Van Ryck De Groot	(Philippines) Francesca La'O (Philippines) Jennifer Saret	L	6–3, 1–6, 4–6
