= 1995 Fed Cup Asia/Oceania Zone Group I – Pool B =

International tennis competition

Group B of the 1995 Fed Cup Asia/Oceania Zone Group I was one of two pools in the Asia/Oceania Zone Group I of the 1995 Fed Cup. Four teams competed in a round robin competition, with the top two teams advancing to the knockout stage and the bottom team being relegated down to Group II for 1996.

| | (China) CHN | (Hong Kong) HKG | (Philippines) PHI | (Chinese Taipei) TPE | RR; W–L | Set; W–L | Game; W–L | Standings |
| China | | 3–0 | 3–0 | 3–0 | 3–0 | 18–0 | 108–18 | 1 |
| Hong Kong | 0–3 | | 2–1 | 2–1 | 2–1 | 8–10 | 75–90 | 2 |
| Philippines | 0–3 | 1–2 | | 2–1 | 1–2 | 6–13 | 82–102 | 3 |
| Chinese Taipei | 0–3 | 1–2 | 1–2 | | 0–3 | 5–14 | 72–110 | 4 |

== China vs. Philippines ==
China
3
Jang Choong Tennis Centre, Jung-gu, South Korea
18 April 1995
Clay (outdoors)

Philippines
0

| | | | 1 | 2 | 3 |
|---|---|---|---|---|---|
| 1 | (China) (Philippines) | Chen Li-Ling; Marisue Jacutin | 6; 2 | 6; 1 |
| 2 | (China) (Philippines) | Yi Jing-Qian; Francesca La'O | 6; 2 | 6; 1 |
| 3 | (China) (Philippines) | Chen Li-Ling / Yi Jing-Qian; Marisue Jacutin / Francesca La'O | 6; 2 | 6; 1 |

== Hong Kong vs. Chinese Taipei ==
Hong Kong
2
Jang Choong Tennis Centre, Jung-gu, South Korea
18 April 1995
Clay (outdoors)

Chinese Taipei
1

| | | | 1 | 2 | 3 |
|---|---|---|---|---|---|---|
| 1 | (Hong Kong) (Chinese Taipei) | Paulette Moreno; Fan-Chiang Yu-Min | 6; 4 | 2; 6 | 3; 6 |
| 2 | (Hong Kong) (Chinese Taipei) | Chan Lee; Julie Huang | 6; 4 | 5; 0 | | retired |
| 3 | (Hong Kong) (Chinese Taipei) | Chan Lee / Paulette Moreno; Fan-Chiang Yu-Min / Wu Yi-Ching | 6; 0 | 6; 1 |

== China vs. Hong Kong ==
China
3
Jang Choong Tennis Centre, Jung-gu, South Korea
19 April 1995
Clay (outdoors)

Hong Kong
0

| | | | 1 | 2 | 3 |
|---|---|---|---|---|---|
| 1 | (China) (Hong Kong) | Chen Li-Ling; Paulette Moreno | 6; 2 | 6; 2 |
| 2 | (China) (Hong Kong) | Yi Jing-Qian; Chan Lee | 6; 1 | 6; 1 |
| 3 | (China) (Hong Kong) | Li Li / Yi Jing-Qian; Fu Yun-Ning / Paulette Moreno | 6; 1 | 6; 2 |

== Philippines vs. Chinese Taipei ==
Philippines
2
Jang Choong Tennis Centre, Jung-gu, South Korea
19 April 1995
Clay (outdoors)

Chinese Taipei
1

| | | | 1 | 2 | 3 |
|---|---|---|---|---|---|
| 1 | (Philippines) (Chinese Taipei) | Marisue Jacutin; Wu Yi-Ching | 3; 6 | 6^{5} 7^{7} |
| 2 | (Philippines) (Chinese Taipei) | Francesca La'O; Fan-Chiang Yu-Min | 7; 5 | 7; 5 |
| 3 | (Philippines) (Chinese Taipei) | Marisue Jacutin / Francesca La'O; Fan-Chiang Yu-Min / Wu Yi-Ching | 5; 7 | 6; 3 | 6; 1 |

== China vs. Chinese Taipei ==
China
3
Jang Choong Tennis Centre, Jung-gu, South Korea
20 April 1995
Clay (outdoors)

Chinese Taipei
0

| | | | 1 | 2 | 3 |
|---|---|---|---|---|---|
| 1 | (China) (Chinese Taipei) | Li Li; Wu Yi-Ching | 7; 5 | 6; 3 |
| 2 | (China) (Chinese Taipei) | Yi Jing-Qian; Fan-Chiang Yu-Min | 6; 3 | 6; 2 |
| 3 | (China) (Chinese Taipei) | Chen Li-Ling / Li Li; Fan-Chiang Yu-Min / Wu Yi-Ching | 6; 2 | 6; 2 |

== Hong Kong vs. Philippines ==
Hong Kong
2
Jang Choong Tennis Centre, Jung-gu, South Korea
20 April 1995
Clay (outdoors)

Philippines
1

| | | | 1 | 2 | 3 |
|---|---|---|---|---|---|
| 1 | (Hong Kong) (Philippines) | Paulette Moreno; Marisue Jacutin | 7; 5 | 7; 5 |
| 2 | (Hong Kong) (Philippines) | Chan Lee; Francesca La'O | 7; 5 | 7^{7} 6^{4} |
| 3 | (Hong Kong) (Philippines) | Fu Yun-Ning / Paulette Moreno; Marisue Jacutin / Francesca La'O | 3; 6 | 1; 6 |

- Chinese Taipei placed last in the pool, and thus was relegated to Group II in 1996, where they achieved advancement back into Group I for 1997.

== See also ==
- Fed Cup structure
