= 1994 Federation Cup Asia/Oceania Zone – Pool B =

Group B of the 1994 Federation Cup Asia/Oceania Zone was one of four pools in the Asia/Oceania zone of the 1994 Federation Cup. Four teams competed in a round robin competition, with the top two teams advancing to the knockout stage.

| | (Thailand) THA | (New Zealand) NZL | (Sri Lanka) SRI | (Singapore) SIN | RR; W–L | Set; W–L | Game; W–L | Standings |
| Thailand | | 2–1 | 3–0 | 3–0 | 3–0 | 14–3 | 99–55 | 1 |
| New Zealand | 1–2 | | 2–1 | 3–0 | 2–1 | 14–6 | 105–71 | 2 |
| Sri Lanka | 0–3 | 1–2 | | 3–0 | 1–2 | 8–9 | 80–74 | 3 |
| Singapore | 0–3 | 0–3 | 0–3 | | 0–3 | 0–18 | 24–108 | 4 |

== Thailand vs. New Zealand ==
Thailand
2
Delhi LTA Complex, New Delhi, India
2 May 1994
Clay (outdoors)

New Zealand
1

| | | | 1 | 2 | 3 |
|---|---|---|---|---|---|
| 1 | (Thailand) (New Zealand) | Suvimol Duangchan; Amanda Trail | 6; 3 | 6; 3 |
| 2 | (Thailand) (New Zealand) | Tamarine Tanasugarn; Claudine Toleafoa | 6; 3 | 4; 6 | 6; 3 |
| 3 | (Thailand) (New Zealand) | Suvimol Duangchan / Benjamas Sangaram; Gaye McManus / Amanda Trail | 5; 7 | 0; 6 |

== Sri Lanka vs. Singapore ==
Sri Lanka
3
Delhi LTA Complex, New Delhi, India
2 May 1994
Clay (outdoors)

Singapore
0

| | | | 1 | 2 | 3 |
|---|---|---|---|---|---|
| 1 | (Sri Lanka) (Singapore) | Saranga Sangakkara; Dionne Lim | 6; 0 | 6; 3 |
| 2 | (Sri Lanka) (Singapore) | Lihini Weerasuriya; Lela Zainal | 6; 3 | 6; 0 |
| 3 | (Sri Lanka) (Singapore) | Saranga Sangakkara / Lihini Weerasuriya; Dionne Lim / Lynette Tay | 6; 0 | 6; 0 |

== Thailand vs. Singapore ==
Thailand
3
Delhi LTA Complex, New Delhi, India
3 May 1994
Clay (outdoors)

Singapore
0

| | | | 1 | 2 | 3 |
|---|---|---|---|---|---|
| 1 | (Thailand) (Singapore) | Pimpisamai Kansuthi; Dionne Lim | 6; 0 | 6; 2 |
| 2 | (Thailand) (Singapore) | Tamarine Tanasugarn; Lela Zainal | 6; 4 | 6; 2 |
| 3 | (Thailand) (Singapore) | Suvimol Duangchan / Benjamas Sangaram; Dionne Lim / Lynette Tay | 6; 1 | 6; 0 |

== New Zealand vs. Sri Lanka ==
New Zealand
2
Delhi LTA Complex, New Delhi, India
3 May 1994
Clay (outdoors)

Sri Lanka
1

| | | | 1 | 2 | 3 |
|---|---|---|---|---|---|
| 1 | (New Zealand) (Sri Lanka) | Amanda Trail; Saranga Sangakkara | 2; 6 | 6; 1 | 4; 6 |
| 2 | (New Zealand) (Sri Lanka) | Claudine Toleafoa; Lihini Weerasuriya | 7^{7} 6^{4} | 7^{7} 6^{3} |
| 3 | (New Zealand) (Sri Lanka) | Claudine Toleafoa / Amanda Trail; Saranga Sangakkara / Lihini Weerasuriya | 6; 2 | 6; 2 |

== Thailand vs. Sri Lanka ==
Thailand
3
Delhi LTA Complex, New Delhi, India
4 May 1994
Clay (outdoors)

Sri Lanka
0

| | | | 1 | 2 | 3 |
|---|---|---|---|---|---|---|
| 1 | (Thailand) (Sri Lanka) | Suvimol Duangchan; Saranga Sangakkara | 7^{7} 6^{2} | 6; 3 |
| 2 | (Thailand) (Sri Lanka) | Tamarine Tanasugarn; Lihini Weerasuriya | 5; 2 | | | retired |
| 3 | (Thailand) (Sri Lanka) | Pimpisamai Kansuthi / Benjamas Sangaram; Anouschka Boralessa / Saranga Sangakkara | 6; 1 | 6; 3 |

== New Zealand vs. Singapore ==
New Zealand
3
Delhi LTA Complex, New Delhi, India
4 May 1994
Clay (outdoors)

Singapore
0

| | | | 1 | 2 | 3 |
|---|---|---|---|---|---|
| 1 | (New Zealand) (Singapore) | Amanda Trail; Dionne Lim | 6; 0 | 6; 1 |
| 2 | (New Zealand) (Singapore) | Claudine Toleafoa; Lela Zainal | 6; 4 | 6; 0 |
| 3 | (New Zealand) (Singapore) | Claudine Toleafoa / Amanda Trail; Dionne Lim / Lela Zainal | 6; 1 | 6; 3 |

== See also ==
- Fed Cup structure
