= Pablo Goncálvez =

Uruguayan serial killer

- Born: Pablo Goncálvez Gallareta; March 6, 1970 (age 56); Bilbao, Spain
- Conviction: Murder
- Penalty: 30 years in prison; released 2016

Details
- Victims: 3
- Span of crimes: January – September 1992
- Country: Uruguay
- States: Canelones, Montevideo

Pablo Goncálvez Gallareta (born March 6, 1970) is a Spanish-born Uruguayan serial killer, the first one in the country's history. He was tried for three homicides and sentenced to thirty years in prison, and as of 2016 is free.

== Biography ==
The son of diplomat Hamlet Goncálvez (died on July 16, 1992), who fulfilled functions representing Uruguay in Spain. At nine years old, Pablo settled in Uruguay, in the Carrasco neighbourhood. There he attended primary school at the Stella Maris College and completed his high school studies in a public high school. A member of the Montevideo high society, he entered as a student of economic sciences, in the Faculty of the Economic Sciences of the University of the Republic.

== Sentence ==
The first homicide victim was Ana Luisa Miller Sichero, which took place in the early hours of the morning of January 1, 1992. The victim was 26 years old, had a degree in history and a practicing teacher, and was the sister of the well-known tennis player Patricia Miller. The autopsy revealed that the young woman was suffocated and then thrown out at 8 AM on January 1, 1992, on the beach of Solymar. At the time of her death, she maintained a relationship with engineer Hugo Sapelli, who was the initial suspect, but took the polygraph test, passed it without incident and left the authorities with no evidence to incriminate him.

The second murder was that of 15-year old Andrea Castro, who was also suffocated to death on September 20, 1992, after leaving the England disco in Montevideo. This crime was perpetrated by manual suffocation and the peculiarity that, as a kind of signature, the criminal left a tie tied to his belongings to the neck of the deceased. When a series of similar ties were found in the hands of Goncálvez, the prosecution counted it as one of the most incriminating pieces of evidence.

The third victim, 22-year old María Victoria Williams, died of asphyxiation inside of Goncálvez's home. In this case, the murderer tricked his victim, who was his neighbor, into believing that Goncálvez's elderly grandmother with whom he lived had suffered a heart attack, and he alone could not revive her. Once inside the farm, Goncálvez strangled Williams and to make sure of her death he placed a nylon bag over her head, enjoying the victim's agony.

He then traveled to Porto Alegre, where his two half-brothers lived. Goncálves was caught in Brazil and taken to the Montevideo Headquarters. In Judicial Headquarters he was sentenced to 30 years in jail for being the sole perpetrator of the murders, although he pleaded not guilty to all charges.

On March 6, 1999, he was attacked by two inmates and sustained 26 stab wounds, but on March 19 he left the Maciel Hospital and was transferred to Central Prison. But before the closing of the Central Prison, he was moved to a Campanero jail in Lavalleja Department.

On July 7, 2005, he married a woman named Alejandra, and the ceremony took place in the premises of the Central Prison, located within the Police Headquarters of Montevideo, but the couple later divorced in 2015.

In 2012, the defense requested early release, which was denied judicially. He continued to serve his sentence behind bars in a minimum security penitentiary located near the city of Minas, but enjoyed temporary leaves.

According to experts, Goncalvez had the same modus operandi in all three of the murders: that of Miller, Williams and Castro. Despite the abundant amount of evidence in the case, Goncalvez continuously denied his guilt.

=== Freedom ===
Goncálvez was released on Thursday, June 23, 2016, at the age of 46, after having fully completed his sentence for the three homicides. He was favored under the count of two or one, only for a reduction of condemnation given to all prisoners who work or study. The day of his release and the days before were characterized by a large media coverage at a national level, revealing the great interest of public opinion on the murders, and who appears to be the first condemned and identified serial killer in Uruguay. The media information disclosed consistent of brief reports from the Campanero penitentiary in Lavalleja (Goncálvez's last place of imprisonment), as well as extensive interviews with criminologists, psychiatrists, criminal lawyers, etc. In 2017 he was arrested in Paraguay and is currently detained on charges of carrying an unregistered weapon and a quantity of cocaine.

== See also ==
- Pablo García Cejas
- List of serial killers by country
