= 1996 Fed Cup Asia/Oceania Zone Group II – play-offs =

Tennis competition play-offs

The play-offs of the 1996 Fed Cup Asia/Oceania Zone Group II were the final stages of the Group II Zonal Competition involving teams from Asia and Oceania. Those that qualified for this stage placed first and second in their respective pools.

Placing	Pool A	Pool B
1	New Zealand	Chinese Taipei
2	Singapore	Uzbekistan
3	Syria	Pacific Oceania
4		Brunei

The four teams were then paired up the team from a different placing of the other group for a play-off tie, with the winners being promoted to Group I in 1997.

== New Zealand vs. Uzbekistan ==
New Zealand
3
700 Years Anniversary Complex, Chiang Mai, Thailand
23 February 1996
Hard (outdoors)

Uzbekistan
0

			1	2	3
1	(New Zealand) (Uzbekistan)	Gaye McManus; Iroda Tulyaganova	6; 2	6; 3
2	(New Zealand) (Uzbekistan)	Claudine Toleafoa; Lilia Biktyakova	6; 1	7^{7} 6^{3}
3	(New Zealand) (Uzbekistan)	Leanne Baker / Tracey King; Natalia Nikitina / Iroda Tulyaganova	6; 3	6; 1

- New Zealand advanced to Group I in 1997, where they placed fifth overall.

== Chinese Taipei vs. Singapore ==
Chinese Taipei
3
700 Years Anniversary Complex, Chiang Mai, Thailand
23 February 1996
Hard (outdoors)

Singapore
0

			1	2	3
1	(Chinese Taipei) (Singapore)	Hsu Hsueh-li; Leong Shieh-Yen	6; 3	6; 0
2	(Chinese Taipei) (Singapore)	Wang Shi-ting; Leong Jil-Lin	6; 1	6; 1
3	(Chinese Taipei) (Singapore)	Fan-Chiang Yu-Min / Hsu Hsueh-li; Lai Wei-Yen / Leong Shieh-Yen	6; 0	6; 1

- Chinese Taipei advanced to Group I in 1997, where they placed second overall.

== See also ==
- Fed Cup structure
