= 1995 Fed Cup Asia/Oceania Zone Group II – Pool A =

International tennis competition

Group A of the 1995 Fed Cup Asia/Oceania Zone Group II was one of two pools in the Asia/Oceania Zone Group I of the 1995 Fed Cup. Four teams competed in a round robin competition, with the top two teams advancing to the knockout stage and the bottom team being relegated down to Group II for 1996.

	(Uzbekistan) UZB	(Singapore) SIN	(Syria) SYR	RR; W–L	Set; W–L	Game; W–L	Standings
Uzbekistan		3–0	3–0	2–0	12–0	72–27	1
Singapore	0–3		3–0	1–1	6–6	51–51	2
Syria	0–3	0–3		0–2	0–12	27–72	3

== Singapore vs. Syria ==
Singapore
3
Maharashtra LTA, Mumbai, India
8 March 1995
Clay (outdoors)

Syria
0

			1	2	3
1	(Singapore) (Syria)	Leong Jil-Lin; Sara Taweel	6; 3	6; 3
2	(Singapore) (Syria)	Lela Zainal; Farah Dayoub	6; 2	6; 4
3	(Singapore) (Syria)	Dionne Lim / Lela Zainal; Rima Taki / Sara Taweel	6; 0	6; 3

== Uzbekistan vs. Singapore ==
Uzbekistan
3
Maharashtra LTA, Mumbai, India
9 March 1995
Clay (outdoors)

Singapore
0

			1	2	3
1	(Uzbekistan) (Singapore)	Oksana Yarikova; Leong Jil-Lin	7; 5	6; 0
2	(Uzbekistan) (Singapore)	Svetlana Sinitsyna; Lela Zainal	7; 5	6; 2
3	(Uzbekistan) (Singapore)	Svetlana Sinitsyna / Oksana Yarikova; Leong Jil-Lin / Lela Zainal	6; 1	6; 2

== Uzbekistan vs. Syria ==
Uzbekistan
3
Maharashtra LTA, Mumbai, India
10 March 1995
Clay (outdoors)

Syria
0

			1	2	3
1	(Uzbekistan) (Syria)	Svetlana Zakharchenko; Farah Dayoub	6; 4	6; 0
2	(Uzbekistan) (Syria)	Svetlana Sinitsyna; Sara Taweel	6; 1	6; 3
3	(Uzbekistan) (Syria)	Natalia Nikitina / Oksana Yarikova; Farah Dayoub / Sara Taweel	6; 1	6; 3

== See also ==
- Fed Cup structure
