= 1994 Federation Cup Asia/Oceania Zone – Pool A =

Group A of the 1994 Federation Cup Asia/Oceania Zone

Group A of the 1994 Federation Cup Asia/Oceania Zone was one of four pools in the Asia/Oceania zone of the 1994 Federation Cup. Four teams competed in a round robin competition, with the top two teams advancing to the knockout stage.

	(Philippines) PHI	(Chinese Taipei) TPE	(India) IND	(Syria) SYR	RR; W–L	Set; W–L	Game; W–L	Standings
Philippines		2–1	2–1	3–0	3–0	15–7	114–76	1
Chinese Taipei	1–2		2–1	3–0	2–1	14–6	104–59	2
India	1–2	1–2		3–0	1–2	12–10	98–81	3
Syria	0–3	0–3	0–3		0–3	0–18	8–108	4

== Philippines vs. Syria ==
Philippines
3
Delhi LTA Complex, New Delhi, India
2 May 1994
Clay (outdoors)

Syria
0

			1	2	3
1	(Philippines) (Syria)	Maricris Gentz; Sara Taweel	6; 0	6; 0
2	(Philippines) (Syria)	Francesca La'O; Farah Dayoub	6; 0	6; 1
3	(Philippines) (Syria)	Maricris Gentz / Francesca La'O; Rima Taki / Sara Taweel	6; 0	6; 0

== Chinese Taipei vs. India ==
Chinese Taipei
2
Delhi LTA Complex, New Delhi, India
2 May 1994
Clay (outdoors)

India
1

			1	2	3
1	(Chinese Taipei) (India)	Weng Tzu-ting; Arati Ponnappa	6; 2	6; 2
2	(Chinese Taipei) (India)	Wang Shi-ting; Nirupama Vaidyanathan	6; 1	6; 2
3	(Chinese Taipei) (India)	Ho Chiu-mei / Weng Tzu-ting; Sohini Kumari / Nirupama Vaidyanathan	1; 6	6; 4	1; 6

== Philippines vs. India ==
Philippines
2
Delhi LTA Complex, New Delhi, India
3 May 1994
Clay (outdoors)

India
1

			1	2	3
1	(Philippines) (India)	Maricris Gentz; Arati Ponnappa	7; 5	3; 6	6; 0
2	(Philippines) (India)	Francesca La'O; Nirupama Vaidyanathan	7; 5	4; 6	4; 6
3	(Philippines) (India)	Maricris Gentz / Francesca La'O; Sohini Kumari / Nirupama Vaidyanathan	6; 4	3; 6	6; 1

== Chinese Taipei vs. Syria ==
Chinese Taipei
3
Delhi LTA Complex, New Delhi, India
3 May 1994
Clay (outdoors)

Syria
0

			1	2	3
1	(Chinese Taipei) (Syria)	Weng Tzu-ting; Rima Taki	6; 1	6; 1
2	(Chinese Taipei) (Syria)	Wang Shi-ting; Farah Dayoub	6; 0	6; 1
3	(Chinese Taipei) (Syria)	Ho Chiu-mei / Lin Ya-hui; Farah Dayoub / Sara Taweel	6; 1	6; 0

== Philippines vs. Chinese Taipei ==
Philippines
2
Delhi LTA Complex, New Delhi, India
4 May 1994
Clay (outdoors)

Chinese Taipei
1

			1	2	3
1	(Philippines) (Chinese Taipei)	Maricris Gentz; Weng Tzu-ting	4; 6	6; 4	7; 5
2	(Philippines) (Chinese Taipei)	Francesca La'O; Wang Shi-ting	1; 6	1; 6
3	(Philippines) (Chinese Taipei)	Maricris Gentz / Francesca La'O; Lin Ya-hui / Weng Tzu-ting	6; 3	7^{7} 6^{3}

== India vs. Syria ==
India
3
Delhi LTA Complex, New Delhi, India
4 May 1994
Clay (outdoors)

Syria
0

			1	2	3
1	(India) (Syria)	Rushmi Chakravarthi; Rima Taki	6; 1	6; 0
2	(India) (Syria)	Nirupama Vaidyanathan; Farah Dayoub	6; 1	6; 0
3	(India) (Syria)	Rushmi Chakravarthi / Arati Ponnappa; Farah Dayoub / Sara Taweel	6; 1	6; 0

== See also ==
- Fed Cup structure
