= Pablo García Cejas =

Convicted Uruguayan serial killer

- Born: Pablo José García Cejas; 1982 (age 43–44); Maldonado, Uruguay
- Other name: "The Maldonado Murderer"
- Conviction: Murder x3
- Penalty: 30 years imprisonment

Details
- Victims: 3
- Span of crimes: April – June 2015
- Country: Uruguay
- State: Maldonado
- Date apprehended: June 15, 2015
- Imprisoned at: Libertad Prison, San José Department

Pablo José García Cejas (born 1982), known as The Maldonado Murderer, is a Uruguayan serial killer who killed three acquaintances in the Maldonado Department within two months in 2015. He was convicted of all three murders and sentenced to 30 years imprisonment, the maximum penalty available under national law.

== Murders ==
In January 2015, Pablo García was visiting a chalet in Punta del Este named "Los Picaflores", where he met 56-year-old Claudia von Graevenitz. She gave him her phone number, telling her new acquaintance that they had something important to discuss. After they met, Von Graevenitz offered him 90,000 pesos and a job in exchange for killing her brother, 58-year-old Alejandro von Graevenitz, a felon with previous convictions, so she could acquire the family home. At first, García refused to accept, but was allowed to think about it, with Von Graevenitz telling him to contact her in person again. On April 2, García travelled to the Von Graevenitz residence to bring Alejandro some items belonging a friend of his. He was invited in, and at the moment when Alejandro turned his back to wash some dishes in the sink, García remembered Claudia's offer. Deciding that he would kill him then and there, he grabbed an iron bar he found lying nearby and began beating Alejandro on the head repeatedly, leaving him seriously injured. He later discarded the iron bar in a landfill, which was later found by the authorities. When found, Alejandro von Graevenitz was still breathing, but died shortly after he was transported to the Pan de Azúcar Hospital. A few days after the killing, Claudia gave the promised sum to García and took him on as an employee at Los Picaflores.

On June 12, the Maldonado Police Department received a call from Marianella González, informing them that her daughter, 19-year-old prostitute Koni Silva, with whom she regularly kept in contact, was missing for more than a week. Later that same day, the owner of a cabin complex situated in Punta del Diablo called the police, informing them that there had been a foul stench emanating from one of the cabins. When authorities entered the cabin, they found the decomposing, naked body of Silva, which had been lousily covered with some white sheets. An autopsy confirmed that the cause of death was two blows to the head, done with a stone from the fireplace, likely a week prior. Further investigation proved that she was last seen with Pablo García Cejas, whom had repeatedly visited to use her services and had even invited her to stay at Los Picaflores, where they smoked marijuana together. According to García's later confession, he had told her about the Von Graevenitz murder, after which Silva threatened to tell the authorities if he didn't give her money. Fearing that he would be jailed, García then grabbed a stone from the fireplace and hit her two times on the head, killing her instantly. After covering up the body, he took Silva's phone and her rented Chevrolet Meriva, throwing away the cabin keys in a garbage container. Over the following week, he kept making up excuses as to why he was unable to return the keys, before returning to the cabin complex on June 11, claiming that he had lost the original keys and needed copies. The employee, Guillermo Martínez, later confirmed to authorities that García was indeed the man last seen with Silva, who left for good after collecting his belongings, which he had left behind in the cabin.

After being identified as a person of interest in Silva's murder, García was spotted driving her truck on the streets of Maldonado. A high-speed chase ensued, with shots fired by police at the vehicle, causing him to crash it Los Ceibos. Despite this, García managed to escape into the hills, evading capture. After walking several kilometers, he arrived in front of a distributing company and begged the watchman to call a taxi, claiming that he had been robbed. After offering the taxi driver his phone number so he could give him the money the following day, he was driven back to Los Picaflores, where he took a bath and ate. On the next day, Claudia von Graevenitz arrived at the chalet, and after learning that a piece of furniture had been sold without her permission, she began arguing with García. During their argument, she slapped him in the face, prompting him to go upstairs to one of the bedrooms, grabbing a knife. While Von Graevenitz attempted to fight back, hitting him with a lamp, García proceeded to stab her numerous times, killing her. After this, he locked all doors and got into an old white Nissan, intending to drive down to Chihuahua, where his parents lived. On June 15, the police conducted a search in Los Picaflores, finding that the entire place had been locked up. After Mrs. von Graevenitz failed to respond to any calls, the authorities entered by force, finding her lifeless body in one of the bedrooms. Immediately realizing that it was likely García who had committed the killing, the search intensified even further, resulting in his subsequent arrest at his parents' house the following day.

== Trial and imprisonment ==
After García's arrest, the murders sparked outrage in the community, with the media calling it one of the most impactful criminal cases in the department's history. In an interview with Noticias de Maldonado, Police Chief Erode Ruíz expressed his disappointment that they couldn't catch the killer earlier, saying that the officers lacked the necessary information to prevent further casualties. At his later trial, Pablo García Cejas was convicted of all three murders and sentenced to 30 years imprisonment, which he's serving at the Libertad Prison. Criminal profiler Adriana Savio Corvino would later provide a psychological analysis of the offender in an interview with Noticias de Maldonado.

A year after the murders, Marianella González, Koni Silva's mother, appeared in the news again after the company from which she had bought life insurance for her daughter, MAPFRE, refused to pay her. It's unknown whether the issue was resolved later on.

== See also ==
- Pablo Goncálvez
- List of serial killers by country
