= Marissa Niroj =

Thai tennis player

- Country (sports): Thailand
- Born: 26 April 1979 (age 46)
- Prize money: $8,090

Singles
- Highest ranking: No. 506 (15 Sep 1997)

Doubles
- Highest ranking: No. 375 (15 Sep 1997)
Medal record
Southeast Asian Games
Silver medal – second place	1997 Jakarta	Women's team
Bronze medal – third place	1997 Jakarta	Women's doubles

Marissa Niroj (born 26 April 1979) is a Thai former professional tennis player. She is now known as Marissa Kroon.

Niroj, a world top-100 junior, made her only WTA Tour main draw appearance at the 1997 Pattaya Open. She reached a career high singles ranking of 506 while competing on the professional tour.

At the 1997 Southeast Asian Games in Jakarta, Niroj won a silver medal for Thailand in the team event and partnered with Suvimol Duangchan for a bronze medal in the women's doubles.

In 1999 she was a member of the Thailand Fed Cup team and appeared in a total of four ties, winning one singles and two doubles rubbers.

== ITF finals ==
=== Singles: 1 (0–1) ===
Outcome	No.	Date	Tournament	Surface	Opponent	Score
Runner-up	1.	Sep 1996	Samutprakan, Thailand	Hard	(Thailand) Suvimol Duangchan	5–7, 4–6

=== Doubles: 2 (0–2) ===
Outcome	No.	Date	Tournament	Surface	Partner	Opponents	Score
Runner-up	1.	Sep 1996	Samutprakan, Thailand	Hard	(Thailand) Pirada Witoonpanich	(Thailand) Suvimol Duangchan (Thailand) Phorhathai Suksamran	4–6, 4–6
Runner-up	2.	May 1998	Maryborough, Australia	Clay	(Thailand) Suvimol Duangchan	(Australia) Lisa McShea (Czech Republic) Monika Maštalířová	4–6, 0–6
