= 1995 Fed Cup Asia/Oceania Zone Group II – Pool B =

International tennis competition

Group B of the 1995 Fed Cup Asia/Oceania Zone Group II was one of two pools in the Asia/Oceania Zone Group I of the 1995 Fed Cup. Four teams competed in a round robin competition, with the top two teams advancing to the knockout stage and the bottom team being relegated down to Group II for 1996.

	(India) IND	(Malaysia) MAS	(Sri Lanka) SRI	POC	RR; W–L	Set; W–L	Game; W–L	Standings
India		2–1	2–1	3–0	3–0	15–4	108–55	1
Malaysia	1–2		3–0	3–0	2–1	14–7	115–72	2
Sri Lanka	1–2	0–3		3–0	1–2	9–10	68–85	3
Pacific Oceania	0–3	0–3	0–3		0–3	1–18	42–111	4

== India vs. Malaysia ==
India
2
Maharashtra LTA, Mumbai, India
8 March 1995
Clay (outdoors)

Malaysia
1

			1	2	3
1	(India) (Malaysia)	Manisha Malhotra; Chiew Chern-Yi	6; 4	4; 6	6; 8
2	(India) (Malaysia)	Nirupama Vaidyanathan; Khoo Chin-bee	6; 3	6; 3
3	(India) (Malaysia)	Manisha Malhotra / Nirupama Vaidyanathan; Chiew Chern-Yi / Khoo Chin-bee	6; 2	6; 1

== Pacific Oceania vs. Sri Lanka ==
Pacific Oceania
0
Maharashtra LTA, Mumbai, India
8 March 1995
Clay (outdoors)

Sri Lanka
3

			1	2	3
1	(Pacific Oceania) (Sri Lanka)	Adriana Thaggard; Saranga Sangakkara	2; 6	1; 6
2	(Pacific Oceania) (Sri Lanka)	Tagifano So'Onalole; Upeka Wijeratne	1; 6	6^{5} 7^{7}
3	(Pacific Oceania) (Sri Lanka)	Tagifano So'Onalole / Adriana Thaggard; Saranga Sangakkara / Upeka Wijeratne	4; 6	2; 6

== India vs. Sri Lanka ==
India
2
Maharashtra LTA, Mumbai, India
9 March 1995
Clay (outdoors)

Sri Lanka
1

			1	2	3
1	(India) (Sri Lanka)	Manisha Malhotra; Saranga Sangakkara	3; 6	4; 6
2	(India) (Sri Lanka)	Nirupama Vaidyanathan; Upeka Wijeratne	6; 0	6; 0
3	(India) (Sri Lanka)	Manisha Malhotra / Nirupama Vaidyanathan; Shalini Perera / Upeka Wijeratne	6; 0	6; 0

== Pacific Oceania vs. Malaysia ==
Pacific Oceania
0
Maharashtra LTA, Mumbai, India
9 March 1995
Clay (outdoors)

Malaysia
3

			1	2	3
1	(Pacific Oceania) (Malaysia)	Adriana Thaggard; Chiew Chern-Yi	0; 6	0; 6
2	(Pacific Oceania) (Malaysia)	Tagifano So'Onalole; Khoo Chin-bee	1; 6	6; 1	2; 6
3	(Pacific Oceania) (Malaysia)	Sylvia Lokollo / Tagifano So'Onalole; Chiew Chern-Yi / Khoo Chin-bee	1; 6	3; 6

== Pacific Oceania vs. India ==
Pacific Oceania
0
Maharashtra LTA, Mumbai, India
10 March 1995
Clay (outdoors)

India
3

			1	2	3
1	(Pacific Oceania) (India)	Adriana Thaggard; Janaki Krishnamoorthy	1; 6	2; 6
2	(Pacific Oceania) (India)	Tagifano So'Onalole; Nirupama Vaidyanathan	1; 6	1; 6
3	(Pacific Oceania) (India)	Sylvia Lokollo / Tagifano So'Onalole; Janaki Krishnamoorthy / Sohini Kumari	5; 7	3; 6

== Malaysia vs. Sri Lanka ==
Malaysia
3
Maharashtra LTA, Mumbai, India
10 March 1995
Clay (outdoors)

Sri Lanka
0

			1	2	3
1	(Malaysia) (Sri Lanka)	Chiew Chern-Yi; Saranga Sangakkara	4; 6	7; 5	6; 3
2	(Malaysia) (Sri Lanka)	Khoo Chin-bee; Upeka Wijeratne	6; 0	6; 2
3	(Malaysia) (Sri Lanka)	Khoo Chin-bee / Liew Meang; Shalini Perera / Upeka Wijeratne	6; 1	6; 2

== See also ==
- Fed Cup structure
