= Loredana Bujor =

Romanian tennis player

- Country (sports): Romania
- Born: 23 June 1972 (age 53); Socialist Republic of Romania
- Retired: 1992
- Prize money: US$65.162

Singles
- Career record: 22–30
- Career titles: 0 WTA, 0 ITF
- Highest ranking: No.299 (10 December 1990)

Doubles
- Career record: 20–24
- Career titles: 0 WTA, 0 ITF
- Highest ranking: No. 366 (1 April 1991)

Loredana Bujor-van Egmond (born 23 June 1972) is a professional Romanian retired tennis player who played for the Romania Fed Cup team. On 10 December 1990, she reached her highest WTA singles ranking of 299 whilst her best doubles ranking was 366 on 1 April 1991.
