= 1995 Fed Cup Asia/Oceania Zone Group I – Knockout Stage =

The Knockout Stage of the 1995 Fed Cup Asia/Oceania Zone Group I was the final stage of the Zonal Competition involving teams from Asia and Oceania. Those that qualified for this stage placed first and second in their respective pools.

Placing	Pool A	Pool B
1	South Korea	China
2	Thailand	Hong Kong
3	Kazakhstan	Philippines
4	New Zealand	Chinese Taipei

The four teams were then randomly drawn into a two-stage knockout tournament, with the winner advancing to the World Group II Play-offs.

== Draw ==
Semifinals; 21 April
South Korea	3
Hong Kong	0
Thailand	1
China	2

Final; 22 April
South Korea	3
China	0

=== Semifinals ===
==== South Korea vs. Hong Kong ====
South Korea
3
Jang Choong Tennis Centre, Jung-gu, South Korea
21 April 1995
Clay (outdoors)

Hong Kong
0

			1	2	3
1	(South Korea) (Hong Kong)	Kim Eun-ha; Paulette Moreno	6; 2	6; 1
2	(South Korea) (Hong Kong)	Park Sung-hee; Chan Lee	6; 2	6; 0
3	(South Korea) (Hong Kong)	Choi Ju-yeon / Kim Eun-ha; Chan Lee / Fu Yun-Ning	6; 0	6; 0

==== China vs. Thailand ====
China
3
Jang Choong Tennis Centre, Jung-gu, South Korea
21 April 1995
Clay (outdoors)

Thailand
0

			1	2	3
1	(China) (Thailand)	Chen Li-Ling; Suvimol Duangchan	6; 2	3; 6	2; 6
2	(China) (Thailand)	Yi Jing-Qian; Tamarine Tanasugarn	6; 3	6; 4
3	(China) (Thailand)	Li Li / Yi Jing-Qian; Suvimol Duangchan / Tamarine Tanasugarn	6; 3	6; 3

=== Final ===
==== South Korea vs. China ====
South Korea
3
Jang Choong Tennis Centre, Jung-gu, South Korea
22 April 1995
Clay (outdoors)

China
0

			1	2	3
1	(South Korea) (China)	Kim Eun-ha; Chen Li-Ling	3; 6	7; 5	6; 2
2	(South Korea) (China)	Park Sung-hee; Yi Jing-Qian	4; 6	6; 3	8; 6
3	(South Korea) (China)	Choi Ju-yeon / Kim Eun-ha; Chen Li-Ling / Li Li	6; 3	1; 6	6; 3

- South Korea advanced to the World Group II Play-offs, where they were drawn against Belgium. However, they lost 2–3, and thus returned to the Asia/Oceania Zone Group I in 1996.

== See also ==
- Fed Cup structure
