= 1996 Fed Cup Asia/Oceania Zone Group II – Pool A =

International tennis competition

Group A of the 1996 Fed Cup Asia/Oceania Zone Group II was one of two pools in the Asia/Oceania Zone Group II of the 1996 Fed Cup. Four teams competed in a round robin competition, with the top two teams advancing to the play-offs.

	(New Zealand) NZL	(Singapore) SIN	(Syria) SYR	RR; W–L	Set; W–L	Game; W–L	Standings
New Zealand		3–0	3–0	2–0	12–0	72–11	1
Singapore	0–3		3–0	1–1	6–8	50–38	2
Syria	0–3	0–3		0–2	2–12	30–44	3

== New Zealand vs. Syria ==
New Zealand
3
700 Years Anniversary Complex, Chiang Mai, Thailand
22 February 1996
Hard (outdoors)

Syria
0

			1	2	3
1	(New Zealand) (Syria)	Gaye McManus; Lara Arnaout	6; 1	6; 1
2	(New Zealand) (Syria)	Claudine Toleafoa; Sara Taweel	6; 0	6; 0
3	(New Zealand) (Syria)	Leanne Baker / Tracey King; Farah Dayoub / Sara Taweel	6; 3	6; 2

== New Zealand vs. Singapore ==
New Zealand
3
700 Years Anniversary Complex, Chiang Mai, Thailand
22 February 1996
Hard (outdoors)

Singapore
0

			1	2	3
1	(New Zealand) (Singapore)	Gaye McManus; Lai Wei-Yen	6; 0	6; 1
2	(New Zealand) (Singapore)	Claudine Toleafoa; Leong Jil-Lin	6; 0	6; 1
3	(New Zealand) (Singapore)	Leanne Baker / Tracey King; Leong Jil-Lin / Leong Shieh-Yen	6; 1	6; 1

== Singapore vs. Syria ==
Singapore
3
700 Years Anniversary Complex, Chiang Mai, Thailand
22 February 1996
Hard (outdoors)

Syria
0

			1	2	3
1	(Singapore) (Syria)	Leong Shieh-Yen; Sara Taweel	6; 4	5; 7	6; 4
2	(Singapore) (Syria)	Leong Jil-Lin; Farah Dayoub	6; 2	6; 2
3	(Singapore) (Syria)	Lai Wei-Yen / Leong Shieh-Yen; Lara Arnaout / Sara Taweel	6; 3	3; 6	6; 2

== See also ==
- Fed Cup structure
