= 1996 Fed Cup Asia/Oceania Zone Group II – Pool B =

International tennis competition

Group B of the 1996 Fed Cup Asia/Oceania Zone Group II was one of two pools in the Asia/Oceania Zone Group II of the 1996 Fed Cup. Four teams competed in a round robin competition, with the top two teams advancing to the play-offs.

	(Chinese Taipei) TPE	(Uzbekistan) UZB	(Pacific Oceania) POC	(Brunei) BRU	RR; W–L	Set; W–L	Game; W–L	Standings
Chinese Taipei		2–1	2–1	3–0	3–0	15–3	96–29	1
Uzbekistan	1–2		3–0	3–0	2–1	14–5	90–56	2
Pacific Oceania	1–2	0–3		3–0	1–2	8–12	73–78	3
Brunei	0–3	0–3	0–3		0–3	0–18	12–108	4

== Chinese Taipei vs. Brunei ==
Chinese Taipei
3
700 Years Anniversary Complex, Chiang Mai, Thailand
21 February 1996
Hard (outdoors)

Brunei
0

			1	2	3
1	(Chinese Taipei) (Brunei)	Hsu Hsueh-li; Pauline Chan	6; 1	6; 0
2	(Chinese Taipei) (Brunei)	Wang Shi-ting; Fiona Keasberry	6; 0	6; 0
3	(Chinese Taipei) (Brunei)	Fan-Chiang Yu-Min / Wu Yi-ching; Fiona Keasberry / Kwong Teng-Lian	6; 1	6; 1

== Chinese Taipei vs. Uzbekistan ==
Chinese Taipei
2
700 Years Anniversary Complex, Chiang Mai, Thailand
22 February 1996
Hard (outdoors)

Uzbekistan
1

			1	2	3
1	(Chinese Taipei) (Uzbekistan)	Hsu Hsueh-li; Iroda Tulyaganova	0; 6	2; 6
2	(Chinese Taipei) (Uzbekistan)	Wang Shi-ting; Natalia Nikitina	6; 1	6; 0
3	(Chinese Taipei) (Uzbekistan)	Hsu Hsueh-li / Wang Shi-ting; Natalia Nikitina / Iroda Tulyaganova	6; 0	6; 0

== Pacific Oceania vs. Chinese Taipei ==
Pacific Oceania
1
700 Years Anniversary Complex, Chiang Mai, Thailand
22 February 1996
Hard (outdoors)

Chinese Taipei
2

			1	2	3
1	(Pacific Oceania) (Chinese Taipei)	Simone Wichman; Hsu Hsueh-li	1; 6	2; 6
2	(Pacific Oceania) (Chinese Taipei)	Tagifano So'Onalole; Wang Shi-ting	1; 6	2; 6
3	(Pacific Oceania) (Chinese Taipei)	Sylvia Lokollo / Tagifano So'Onalole; Fan-Chiang Yu-Min / Wu Yi-ching	3; 6	6; 1	0; 1	retired

== Pacific Oceania vs. Uzbekistan ==
Pacific Oceania
0
700 Years Anniversary Complex, Chiang Mai, Thailand
22 February 1996
Hard (outdoors)

Uzbekistan
3

			1	2	3
1	(Pacific Oceania) (Uzbekistan)	Simone Wichman; Natalia Nikitina	3; 6	1; 6
2	(Pacific Oceania) (Uzbekistan)	Tagifano So'Onalole; Lilia Biktyakova	4; 6	7; 5	3; 6
3	(Pacific Oceania) (Uzbekistan)	Tagifano So'Onalole / Simone Wichman; Natalia Nikitina / Iroda Tulyaganova	4; 6	2; 6

== Uzbekistan vs. Brunei ==
Uzbekistan
3
700 Years Anniversary Complex, Chiang Mai, Thailand
22 February 1996
Hard (outdoors)

Brunei
0

			1	2	3
1	(Uzbekistan) (Brunei)	Olesya Artemeva; Pauline Chan	6; 2	6; 0
2	(Uzbekistan) (Brunei)	Iroda Tulyaganova; Fiona Keasberry	6; 1	6; 1
3	(Uzbekistan) (Brunei)	Lilia Biktyakova / Natalia Nikitina; Fiona Keasberry / Kwong Teng-Lian	6; 2	6; 0

== Pacific Oceania vs. Brunei ==
Pacific Oceania
3
700 Years Anniversary Complex, Chiang Mai, Thailand
22 February 1996
Hard (outdoors)

Brunei
0

			1	2	3
1	(Pacific Oceania) (Brunei)	Simone Wichman; Pauline Chan	6; 0	6; 0
2	(Pacific Oceania) (Brunei)	Tagifano So'Onalole; Fiona Keasberry	6; 0	6; 0
3	(Pacific Oceania) (Brunei)	Sylvia Lokollo / Tagifano So'Onalole; Fiona Keasberry / Kwong Teng-Lian	6; 0	6; 3

== See also ==
- Fed Cup structure
