= Patricia Miller (tennis) =

Uruguayan tennis player

- Full name: Patricia Miller Sichero
- Country (sports): Uruguay
- Born: 31 January 1972 (age 54)
- Plays: Left-handed
- Prize money: $21,579

Singles
- Career record: 61–52
- Career titles: 0
- Highest ranking: No. 218 (30 January 1989)

Doubles
- Career record: 40–29
- Career titles: 4 ITF
- Highest ranking: No. 194 (10 June 1991)
Medal record
Women's tennis
Pan American Games
| Bronze medal – third place | 1987 Indianapolis | Women's Singles |

Patricia Miller Sichero (born 31 January 1972) is a former professional tennis player from Uruguay.

== Biography ==
Miller grew up in the Uruguayan capital, attending the British Schools of Montevideo.

A left handed player, she was a singles bronze medalist at the 1987 Pan American Games as a 15-year old.

From 1988 to 1991, she featured in the main draw of several WTA Tour events, and in the early 1990s played in 11 Fed Cup ties for Uruguay with a win–loss record of 8–8.

Her sister, Ana Luisa, was the first victim of Uruguayan serial killer Pablo Goncálvez, who suffocated the 26-year old to death in 1992.

== ITF finals ==
$25,000 tournaments
$10,000 tournaments

=== Singles (0–1) ===
| Result | No. | Date | Tournament | Surface | Opponent | Score |
|---|---|---|---|---|---|---|
| Loss | 1. | 5 November 1990 | ITF Asunción, Paraguay | Clay | (United States) Jolene Watanabe | 2–6, 1–6 |

=== Doubles (4–4) ===
| Result | No. | Date | Tournament | Surface | Partner | Opponents | Score |
|---|---|---|---|---|---|---|---|
| Win | 1. | 28 September 1987 | ITF Santiago, Chile | Clay | (Switzerland) Michèle Strebel | (Chile) Macarena Miranda (Argentina) Andrea Tiezzi | 6–4, 6–2 |
| Loss | 1. | 28 September 1988 | ITF Detroit, United States | Hard | (Argentina) Cristina Tessi | (United States) Jennifer Fuchs (Australia) Robyn Lamb | 1–6, 6–7 |
| Win | 2. | 26 March 1990 | ITF Madrid, Spain | Clay | (Luxembourg) Karin Kschwendt | (Soviet Union) Natalia Biletskaya (Soviet Union) Svetlana Komleva | 4–6, 7–5, 6–3 |
| Loss | 2. | 17 September 1990 | ITF Napoli, Italy | Hard | (Spain) Marta Alastrue | (Czechoslovakia) Lucie Ludvigová (Czechoslovakia) Helena Vildová | 6–3, 1–6, 0–6 |
| Win | 3. | 22 October 1990 | ITF Santiago, Chile | Clay | (Argentina) Inés Gorrochategui | (Chile) Paula Cabezas (Paraguay) Sandra Ugarriza | 3–6, 6–1, 7–5 |
| Loss | 3. | 5 November 1990 | ITF Asunción, Paraguay | Clay | (Argentina) María José Gaidano | (Paraguay) Viviana Valdovinos (United States) Jolene Watanabe | 6–3, 4–6, 6–7 |
| Win | 4. | 29 May 1991 | ITF Brindisi, Italy | Clay | (Argentina) Inés Gorrochategui | (Czechoslovakia) Katarína Studeníková (Romania) Irina Spîrlea | 6–1, 7–6 |
| Loss | 4. | 1 July 1991 | ITF Stuttgart, Germany | Clay | (Germany) Henrike Kadzidroga | (United States) Lisa Seemann (Austria) Heidi Sprung | 6–7, 1–6 |
