= Ellinore Lightbody =

British tennis coach and player

- Country (sports): United Kingdom; Hong Kong
- Born: 16 February 1959 (age 66); Greenock, Scotland

Singles

Grand Slam singles results
- French Open: Q1 (1982, 1983)
- Wimbledon: 2R (1982)
- US Open: Q2 (1982)

Doubles

Grand Slam doubles results
- Wimbledon: 1R (1983)

Ellinore Lightbody (born 16 February 1959) is a British tennis coach and former professional player.

Scottish-born, Lightbody is the daughter of Wales tennis executive Jim Lightbody and grew up in Swansea.

Lightbody featured in the singles main draw of the 1982 Wimbledon Championships and later coached in Hong Kong, where she made Federation Cup appearances for the British territory in 1990 and 1991.

As a coach in the United Kingdom she has previously served as the national coaches of both Wales and Scotland.
