= Pimpisamai Kansuthi =

Thai tennis player

- Country (sports): Thailand
- Born: 27 November 1977 (age 48)

Singles
- Career record: 1–1 (Fed Cup & WTA Tour)
- Highest ranking: No. 609 (7 Nov 1994)

Doubles
- Career record: 2–3 (Fed Cup)
- Career titles: 1 ITF
- Highest ranking: No. 461 (17 Oct 1994)

Pimpisamai Kansuthi (born 27 November 1977), also known as Jean Kansuthi, is a Thai former professional tennis player. Her daughter Mai and son Tanapatt, both world top-100 juniors, compete on the professional tour.

Kansuthi, a native of Chonburi, was active on tour in the early 1990s. She reached a best singles world ranking of 609 and made a WTA Tour main draw appearance at the 1994 Pattaya Open. A Thai representative at the 1994 Asian Games, she also featured in ties for the Thailand Fed Cup team across 1994 and 1995. She left tennis to further her education but played at collegiate level for Eastern Michigan University and was a two-time MAC Player of the Year.

== ITF finals ==
=== Singles: 1 (0–1) ===
Outcome	Date	Tournament	Surface	Opponent	Score
Runner-up	Sep 1994	ITF Khon Kaen, Thailand	Hard	(Thailand) Suvimol Duangchan	6–4, 6–7, 1–6

=== Doubles: 1 (1–0) ===
Outcome	Date	Tournament	Surface	Partner	Opponents	Score
Winner	Sep 1994	ITF Hat Yai, Thailand	Hard	(Thailand) Suvimol Duangchan	(Thailand) Sasitorn Tangthienkul (Thailand) Tamarine Tanasugarn	6–3, 7–5
