= Cathrine Instebø =

Norwegian tennis player

- Country (sports): Norway
- Born: 28 November 1973 (age 51)
- Height: 5 ft 8 in (173 cm)

Singles
- Career record: 0–1 (WTA Tour)
- Highest ranking: No. 632 (27 Apr 1992)

Doubles
- Highest ranking: No. 579 (31 Aug 1992)

Cathrine Instebø (born 28 November 1973) is a Norwegian former professional tennis player.

Instebø, the first professional tennis player to come from Bergen, reached career best world rankings of 632 in singles and 579 in doubles. A five-time national singles champion, she competed for the Norway Federation Cup team from 1990 to 1993. She later played collegiate tennis for the University of Florida.
