= 1996 Fed Cup Asia/Oceania Zone =

Subsection of tennis competition

The Asia/Oceania Zone was one of three zones of regional competition in the 1996 Fed Cup. The 1996 Fed Cup Asia/Oceania Zone was a tennis competition held as part of the Fed Cup tournament, which is the premier international team competition in women's tennis. The Asia/Oceania Zone is one of the regional zones in the Fed Cup competition, and teams from this zone compete for the opportunity to advance to the higher stages of the tournament.

== Group I ==
- Venue: 700 Years Anniversary Complex, Chiang Mai, Thailand (outdoor hard)
- Date: 21–24 February

The eight teams were divided into two pools of four teams. The top two teams of each pool play-off in a two-round knockout stage to decide which nation progresses to World Group II play-offs. Nations finishing in the bottom place in each pool were relegated to Asia/Oceania Zone Group II for 1997.

=== Pools ===
	Pool A	KOR	IND	HKG	MAS
1	South Korea (3–0)		3–0	3–0	3–0
2	India (2–1)	0–3		2–1	3–0
3	Hong Kong (1–2)	0–3	1–2		3–0
4	Malaysia (0–3)	0–3	0–3	0–3	

	Pool B	CHN	THA	KAZ	PHI
1	China (3–0)		3–0	3–0	3–0
2	Thailand (2–1)	0–3		2–0	3–0
3	Kazakhstan (1–2)	0–3	0–2		2–1
4	Philippines (0–3)	0–3	0–3	1–2	

=== Knockout stage ===
Semifinals; 23 February
South Korea	3
Thailand	0
India	0
China	3

Final; 24 February
South Korea	2
China	1

- South Korea advanced to World Group II Play-offs.
- Malaysia and Philippines relegated to Group II in 1997.

== Group II ==
- Venue: 700 Years Anniversary Complex, Chiang Mai, Thailand (outdoor hard)
- Date: 19–24 January

The seven teams were divided into two pools of three and four. The top two teams from each pool then moved on to the play-off stage of the competition. The two teams that won a match from the play-off stage would advance to Group I for 1997.

=== Pools ===
	Pool A	NZL	SIN	SYR
1	New Zealand (2–0)		3–0	3–0
2	Singapore (1–1)	0–3		3–0
3	Syria (0–2)	0–3	0–3	

	Pool B	TPE	UZB	POC	BRU
1	Chinese Taipei (3–0)		2–1	2–1	3–0
2	Uzbekistan (2–1)	1–2		3–0	3–0
3	Pacific Oceania (1–2)	1–2	0–3		3–0
4	Brunei (0–3)	0–3	0–3	0–3	

=== Play-offs ===
Winning team	Score	Losing team
New Zealand	3–0	Uzbekistan
Chinese Taipei	3–0	Singapore

- New Zealand and Chinese Taipei advanced to Group I in 1997.

== See also ==
- Fed Cup structure
