= Jennifer Saret =

Filipino tennis player (born 1974)

- Country (sports): Philippines
- Residence: Metro Manila, Philippines
- Born: 12 December 1974 (age 51)
- Height: 5 ft 7 in (170 cm)

Singles
- Highest ranking: No. 639 (24 August 1992)

Doubles
- Highest ranking: No. 454 (11 November 1991)
Medal record
Women's tennis
Representing Philippines
Southeast Asian Games
| Silver medal – second place | 1991 Manila | Team |
| Silver medal – second place | 1993 Singapore | Mixed Doubles |
| Silver medal – second place | 1993 Singapore | Team |
| Bronze medal – third place | 1989 Kuala Lumpur | Team |
| Bronze medal – third place | 1991 Manila | Doubles |
| Bronze medal – third place | 1991 Manila | Mixed Doubles |
| Bronze medal – third place | 1993 Singapore | Doubles |
| Bronze medal – third place | 1995 Chang Mai | Doubles |
| Bronze medal – third place | 1995 Chang Mai | Team |
| Bronze medal – third place | 1997 Jakarta | Team |
| Bronze medal – third place | 2001 Kuala Lumpur | Team |

Jennifer Saret (born 12 December 1974) is a Filipino former tennis player.

== Tennis career ==
Saret featured in a total of 24 ties for the Philippines Fed Cup team and was a regular medalist for her country at the Southeast Asian Games, debuting in the regional competition as a 14 year old in 1989. Locally, she made her mark by winning four successive PCA Open championships from 1989 to 1992. She was a junior doubles semi-finalist at the 1991 Wimbledon Championships.

From 1992 to 1996 she took up a sports scholarship to attend Brigham Young University (BYU) in the United States, where she played varsity tennis. She was the Western Athletic Conference Player of the Year in 1995.

Her Fed Cup career was put on hold while she was at BYU but she returned to the national team in 1997 and made her last appearance in 2001. She retired from Fed Cup tennis with a Philippines record 26 wins, 15 of which came in singles.

== ITF finals ==
=== Doubles: 1 (0–1) ===
| Result | Date | Tournament | Surface | Partner | Opponents | Score |
|---|---|---|---|---|---|---|
| Loss | 7 October 1991 | Matsuyama, Japan | Hard | (China) Yi Jing-Qian | (Hong Kong) Paulette Moreno (Australia) Jenny Byrne | 6–1, 4–6, 4–6 |
