= Francesca La'O =

Filipina tennis player (born 1976)

- Full name: Francesca Maria La'O
- Country (sports): Philippines
- Born: 7 May 1976 (age 49)
- Prize money: $ 8,303

Singles
- Career titles: 0
- Highest ranking: No. 386 (7 November 1994)

Doubles
- Career titles: 1 ITF
- Highest ranking: No. 251 (24 July 1995)
Medal record
Southeast Asian Games
Gold medal – first place	1993 Singapore	Women's doubles
Silver medal – second place	1991 Manila	Women's team
Silver medal – second place	1993 Singapore	Women's team

Francesca Maria La'O (born 7 May 1976) is a Filipina former professional tennis player.

La'o, who was highest ever ranked Filipino singles player on the WTA Tour for a time with a WTA rank of 386, was a Southeast Asian Games doubles gold medalist and featured in 19 Fed Cup ties for the Philippines, with her first stint in the team from 1991 to 1995.

Between 1996 and 1999, La'O played collegiate tennis with UC Berkeley and earned NCAA All-American honors.

In 2003, she came back for one final Fed Cup season, before retiring with eight singles and nine doubles wins.

== ITF finals ==
=== Doubles (1–2) ===
Result	Date	Tournament	Surface	Partner	Opponents	Score
Win	Nov 1992	ITF Manila, Philippines	Hard	(Philippines) Evangelina Olivarez	(Philippines) Rocio Matute (Philippines) Dorothy-Jane Suarez	6–2, 6–0
Loss	Dec 1993	ITF Singapore	Hard	(Philippines) Evangelina Olivarez	(Indonesia) Natalia Soetrisno (Indonesia) Romana Tedjakusuma	w/o
Loss	May 1995	ITF Beijing, China	Hard	(Chinese Taipei) Weng Tzu-ting	(South Korea) Kim Ih-sook (South Korea) Kim Eun-ha	2–6, 3–6
