= Suvimol Duangchan =

Thai tennis player

- Country (sports): Thailand
- Born: 10 April 1974 (age 51) Chiang Mai, Thailand
- Height: 162 cm (5 ft 4 in)
- Retired: 1998
- Prize money: $29,855

Singles
- Career record: 71-66
- Career titles: 0 WTA, 5 ITF
- Highest ranking: No. 346 (10 May 1993)

Doubles
- Career record: 59-52
- Career titles: 0 WTA, 5 ITF
- Highest ranking: No. 322 (25 October 1993)

Suvimol Duangchan (born 10 April 1974) is a Thai former professional tennis player.

Born in Chiang Mai, Duangchan played on tour in the 1990s and featured in a total of 27 Fed Cup ties for Thailand. She had a 21/19 overall win–loss record, which included a singles win over Romania's Irina Spîrlea.

Duangchan won a gold medal for Thailand at the 1991 Southeast Asian Games in Manila and represented her country in the doubles at the 1992 Barcelona Olympics, partnering Benjamas Sangaram.

== ITF finals ==
=== Singles (5–4) ===
Result	No.	Date	Tournament	Surface	Opponent	Score
Win	1.	15 November 1992	Manila, Philippines	Hard	(Philippines) Evangelina Olivarez	6–2, 7–6
Loss	2.	22 November 1992	Nonthaburi, Thailand	Hard	(Poland) Isabela Listowska	6–7, 3-6
Loss	3.	1 February 1993	Bandar, Brunei	Hard	(Indonesia) Romana Tedjakusuma	1–6, 2–6
Loss	4.	5 April 1993	Bangkok, Thailand	Hard	(Ukraine) Irina Sukhova	3–6, 1–6
Win	5.	25 September 1994	Khon Kaen, Thailand	Hard	(Thailand) Pimpisamai Kansuthi	4–6, 7–6, 6-1
Win	6.	17 September 1995	Khon Kaen, Thailand	Hard	(Thailand) Sasitorn Tangthienkul	6–2, 6-1
Win	7.	24 September 1995	Samutprakan, Thailand	Hard	(India) Jahnavi Parekh	6–0, 6-0
Win	8.	22 September 1996	Samutprakan, Thailand	Hard	(Thailand) Marissa Niroj	7–5, 6-4
Loss	9.	24 August 1997	Samut Prakan, Thailand	Hard	(Hungary) Adrienn Hegedűs	4–6, 4–6

=== Doubles (5–3) ===
Result	No.	Date	Tournament	Surface	Partner	Opponents	Score
Loss	1.	2 September 1991	Bangkok, Thailand	Hard	(Thailand) Benjamas Sangaram	(China) Li Fang (China) Tang Min	4–6, 2–6
Win	2.	15 November 1992	Manila, Philippines	Hard	(Thailand) Benjamas Sangaram	(Philippines) Mia Fernandez (Philippines) Evangelina Olivarez	6–1, 6–3
Win	3.	22 November 1992	Nonthaburi, Thailand	Hard	(Thailand) Benjamas Sangaram	(Japan) Seiko Ichioka (United States) Sandy Sureephong	6–4, 6–7, 6-3
Win	4.	5 April 1993	Bangkok, Thailand	Hard	(Ukraine) Irina Sukhova	(United States) Amy deLone (Australia) Kate McDonald	6–3, 6–2
Win	5.	19 September 1994	Hat Yai, Thailand	Hard	(Thailand) Pimpisamai Kansuthi	(Thailand) Sasitorn Tangthienkul (Thailand) Tamarine Tanasugarn	6–3, 7-5
Loss	6.	17 September 1995	Khon Kaen, Thailand	Hard	(Thailand) Sasitorn Tangthienkul	(Australia) Nicole Kenneally (Australia) Lana Scardigno	3–6, 1-6
Win	7.	22 September 1996	Samutprakan, Thailand	Hard	(Thailand) Phorhathai Suksamran	(Thailand) Marissa Niroj (Thailand) Pirada Witoonpanich	6–4, 6-4
Loss	8.	10 May 1998	Maryborough, Australia	Clay	(Thailand) Marissa Niroj	(Australia) Lisa McShea (Czech Republic) Monika Maštalířová	4–6, 0–6
