= 2008 Fed Cup Asia/Oceania Zone Group I – play-offs =

International tennis competition play-offs

The play-offs of the 2008 Fed Cup Asia/Oceania Zone Group I were the final stages of the Group I Zonal Competition involving teams from Asia and Oceania. Using the positions determined in their pools, the eight teams faced off to determine their placing in the 2008 Fed Cup Asia/Oceania Zone Group I. The top team advanced to the World Group II, and the bottom team was relegated down to the Group II for the next year.

Placing	Pool A	Pool B
1	New Zealand	Uzbekistan
2	Australia	Chinese Taipei
3	Indonesia	Thailand
4	India	Hong Kong

== Promotion play-offs ==
The first placed teams of each pool were placed against each other in a head-to-head round. The winner of the rounds advanced to the World Group II play-offs, where they would get a chance to advance to the World Group II for next year.

=== New Zealand vs. Uzbekistan ===
New Zealand
1
National Tennis Development Centre, Bangkok, Thailand
2 February 2008
Plexipave (outdoors)

Uzbekistan
2

			1	2	3
1	(New Zealand) (Uzbekistan)	Sacha Jones; Iroda Tulyaganova	6; 4	1; 6	2; 6
2	(New Zealand) (Uzbekistan)	Marina Erakovic; Akgul Amanmuradova	6; 4	7^{7} 6^{3}
3	(New Zealand) (Uzbekistan)	Leanne Baker / Marina Erakovic; Akgul Amanmuradova / Iroda Tulyaganova	6; 4	2; 6	6^{7} 7^{9}

== Third to Fourth play-off ==
Chinese Taipei placed third overall while Australia placed fourth.

== Fifth to Sixth play-off ==
The third placed teams of each pool were placed against each other in a ties. The winner of the tie was allocated fifth place in the Group while the loser was allocated sixth.

=== Indonesia vs. Thailand ===
Indonesia
2
National Tennis Development Centre, Bangkok, Thailand
2 February 2008
Plexipave (outdoors)

Thailand
1

			1	2	3
1	(Indonesia) (Thailand)	Vivien Silfany-Tony; Suchanun Viratprasert	6^{5} 7^{7}			retired
2	(Indonesia) (Thailand)	Lavinia Tananta; Nudnida Luangnam	6; 4			retired
3	(Indonesia) (Thailand)	Ayu-Fani Damayanti / Sandy Gumulya; Nudnida Luangnam / Suchanun Viratprasert				w/o

== Relegation play-offs ==
The last placed teams of each pool were placed against each other in a head-to-head round. The losing team was relegated to Group II for next year.

=== India vs. Hong Kong ===
India
2
National Tennis Development Centre, Bangkok, Thailand
2 February 2008
Plexipave (outdoors)

Hong Kong
1

			1	2	3
1	(India) (Hong Kong)	Shikha Uberoi; Yang Zi-Jun	6; 1	7^{7} 6^{5}
2	(India) (Hong Kong)	Isha Lakhani; Zhang Ling	5; 7	3; 6
3	(India) (Hong Kong)	Sania Mirza / Sunitha Rao; Yang Zi-Jun / Zhang Ling	7^{8} 6^{6}	6; 2

== Final Placements ==
Placing	Teams
Promoted	Uzbekistan
Second	New Zealand
Third	Chinese Taipei
Fourth	Australia
Fifth	Indonesia
Sixth	Thailand
Seventh	India
Relegated	Hong Kong

- Uzbekistan advanced to the World Group II play-offs, and were drawn against Slovakia. They lost 0–5, and thus they were relegated back to Group I for 2009.
- Hong Kong was relegated down to Asia/Oceania Zone Group II for the next year, where they placed second overall.

== See also ==
- Fed Cup structure
