= 2008 Fed Cup Asia/Oceania Zone =

Subsection of tennis competition

The Asia/Oceania Zone was one of three zones of regional competition in the 2008 Fed Cup.

== Group I ==
- Venue: National Tennis Development Centre, Bangkok, Thailand (outdoor hard)
- Date: 30 January – 2 February

The eight teams were divided into two pools of four teams. The teams that finished first in the pools played-off to determine which team would partake in the World Group II Play-offs. The two nations coming last in the pools also played-off to determine which would be relegated to Group II for 2009.

=== Pools ===
	Pool A	NZL	AUS	INA	IND
1	New Zealand (2–1)		1–2	3–0	2–1
2	Australia (2–1)	2–1		1–2	3–0
3	Indonesia (2–1)	0–3	2–1		2–1
4	India (0–3)	1–2	0–3	1–2	

	Pool B	UZB	TPE	THA	HKG
1	Uzbekistan (3–0)		2–1	2–1	2–1
2	Chinese Taipei (2–1)	1–2		3–0	2–1
3	Thailand (1–2)	1–2	0–3		3–0
4	Hong Kong (0–3)	1–2	1–2	0–3	

=== Play-offs ===
Placing	A Team	Score	B Team
Promotion	New Zealand	1–2	Uzbekistan
3rd–4th	Australia	w/o	Chinese Taipei
5th–6th	Indonesia	2–1	Thailand
Relegation	India	2–1	Hong Kong

- Uzbekistan advanced to 2008 World Group II Play-offs.
- Hong Kong was relegated to Group II for 2009.

== Group II ==
- Venue: National Tennis Development Centre, Bangkok, Thailand (outdoor hard)
- Date: 30 January – 2 February

The seven teams were divided into one pool of three teams and one pool of four. The top team of each pool played-off against each other to decide which nation progress to the Group I.

=== Pools ===
	Pool A	KOR	PHI	SYR
1	South Korea (2–0)		2–1	3–0
2	Philippines (1–1)	1–2		3–0
3	Syria (0–2)	0–3	0–3	

	Pool B	KAZ	SIN	TKM	SRI
1	Kazakhstan (3–0)		3–0	3–0	3–0
2	Singapore (2–1)	0–3		2–1	2–1
3	Turkmenistan (1–2)	0–3	1–2		2–1
4	Sri Lanka (0–3)	0–3	1–2	1–2	

=== Play-offs ===
Placing	A Team	Score	B Team
Promotion	South Korea	2–0	Kazakhstan
3rd–4th	Philippines	2–1	Singapore
5th–6th	Syria	1–2	Turkmenistan
7th		N/A	Sri Lanka

- South Korea advanced to Group I for 2009.

== See also ==
- Fed Cup structure
