= 2024 Milano P1 =

Padel championships

- Date: 30 November – 8 December
- Edition: 3rd
- Category: P1
- Prize money: €470.000
- Location: Milan, Italy
- Venue: Allianz Cloud Arena

Champions
- Men's doubles: (Argentina) Agustín Tapia (Spain) Arturo Coello
- Women's doubles: (Spain) Claudia Fernández (Spain) Gemma Triay

Chronology

The 2024 Milan P1 (officially 2024 Milano Premier Padel P1) was the twenty-third tournament of the third season organized by Premier Padel, promoted by the International Padel Federation, and with the financial backing of Nasser Al-Khelaïfi's Qatar Sports Investments, now serving as the premier padel circuit.

In the women's category, the FIP's second and third-ranked pairs met in the finals for the fourth time this season. Despite winning the first set and the match heading toward a third, Bea González and Delfina Brea were forced to retire due to an injury sustained by González, handing Claudia Fernández and Gemma Triay their second consecutive title and their sixth of 2024.

In the men's category, Alejandro Galán and Federico Chingotto improved their performance from the previous two tournaments to reach the finals, where they faced the number 1 seeds Agustín Tapia and Arturo Coello in a final for the 14th time. Coello and Tapia defeated the number 2 seeds and claimed their thirteenth title of the season.

== Relevant Data ==
=== Ari/Paula and Bea González absent from Milan ===
Having already secured the number 1 ranking, Ariana Sánchez and Paula Josemaría, the world number ones decided to take a break and sit out the Italy P1 due to an issue with Paula Josemaría's right knee, opting to rest and ensure she is in top shape for the season's final tournament, the Premier Padel Finals.

The number ones absence altered the entire draw and potential matchups in the final rounds, with Bea González and Delfina Brea entering as the number 2 seeds, meaning they could no longer face Fernández and Gemma Triay in a potential semifinal. After withdrawing from the Milano P1 final, Bea González announced she would will miss the Premier Padel Finals due to a pectoral injury. With Bea's injury, Tamara Icardo who had finished 17th in the Race rankings following the Milan tournament, would make her the first finals appearance.

By missing the last tournament, this would mark Bea and Delfina last game as a pair, as the Argentine would embark on a new project for 2025.

=== Sanyo out of the Premier Padel Finals ===
With his loss against Pablo Cardona and Paquito Navarro in the round of 16, for the first time in his career, Sanyo Gutiérrez would not be qualified for the season-ending tournament. The victory would also give Cardona a spot in the last tournament, held in Barcelona.

=== Belasteguín last match ===
The Round of 16 match against Javi Garrido and Lucas Bergamini would be the last of Fernando Belasteguín's illustrious career. Belasteguín retired holding several records, including the longest reign as world number one with 16 consecutive years and the most titles in the history of the World Padel Tour (WPT). Throughout his career, he won 260 titles.

=== The number ones win another title ===
By defeating Alejandro Galán and Federico Chingotto in the finals, Agustín Tapia and Arturo Coello claimed their ninth consecutive title, and fourteenth overall, marking a season with just six losses in 99 matches. Following the summer break, Coello and Tapia won nine straight tournaments (seven of them against the number two pair) and amassed a 45-match winning streak.

In total, the year's top-ranked pair won 14 of the 20 Premier Padel tournaments they entered, missing the final only in Seville, and finishing the season with a record of 93 wins out of 99 matches. This marks their second season as the sport's best, with only three pairs having dominated for longer: Juan Martín Díaz and Fernando Belasteguín (13 seasons), Fernando Belasteguín and Pablo Lima (three), and Alejandro Galán and Juan Lebrón (three).

== Seeds ==
Male

Rnk.	Team	FIP Ranking Points
1	(Argentina) Agustín Tapia (Spain) Arturo Coello	33138
2	(Spain) Alejandro Galán (Argentina) Federico Chingotto	23993
3	(Spain) Juan Lebrón (Argentina) Martin Di Nenno	14600
4	(Argentina) Franco Stupaczuk (Spain) Miguel Yanguas	13945
5	(Spain) Pablo Cardona (Spain) Paquito Navarro	8230
6	(Spain) Coki Nieto (Spain) Jon Sanz	8045
7	(Spain) Javi Garrido (Brazil) Lucas Bergamini	7589
8	(Spain) Eduardo Alonso (Spain) Momo Gonzalez	7465
9	(Spain) Alejandro Arroyo (Spain) Alejandro Ruiz	5813
10	(Spain) Jose Garcia Diestro (Argentina) Sanyo Gutiérrez	4323
11	(Argentina) Lucho Capra (Argentina) Maxi Sanchéz	3996
12	(Spain) Francisco Guerrero (Spain) Jairo Bautista	3952
13	(Argentina) Fernando Belasteguín (Argentina) Valentino Libaak	3944
14	(United Arab Emirates) Inigo Jofre (Argentina) Juan Tello	3657
15	(Spain) Javier Leal (Brazil) Lucas Campagnolo	3536
16	(Argentina) Alex Chozas (Argentina) Leandro Augsburguer	3444

Female

Rnk.	Team	FIP Ranking Points
1	(Spain) Ariana Sánchez (Spain) Paula Josemaria	29982
2	(Spain) Claudia Fernandez (Spain) Gemma Triay	19811
3	(Spain) Beatriz Gonzalez (Argentina) Delfina Brea	16069
4	(Spain) Marta Ortega (Portugal) Sofia Araújo	11892
5	(Spain) Lucia Sainz (Spain) Patricia Llaguno	10390
6	(Spain) Alejandra Salazar (Spain) Jessica Castello	10346
7	(Argentina) Claudia Jensen (Spain) Tamara Icardo	8537
8	(Argentina) Aranzazu Osoro (Spain) Veronica Virseda	8059
9	(Spain) Alejandra Alonso (Spain) Andrea Ustero	7971
10	(Spain) Marta Borrero (Argentina) Virginia Riera	4462
11	(Spain) Beatriz Caldera (Spain) Lorena Rufo	4164
12	(Spain) Marina Guinart (Spain) Victoria Iglesias	3411
13	(Spain) Carmen Goenaga (Spain) Sara Ruiz	3395
14	(Italy) Carolina Orsi (Spain) Nuria Rodriguez	3360
15	(Spain) Carla Mesa (Spain) Lucia Martinez Gomez	3228
16	(Russia) Ksenia Sharifova (Spain) Marta Marrero	3082

== Head-to-head record between teams ranked in the top 4 during the season ==
=== Man's ===
Record	Coello–Tapia	Galán–Chingotto	Lebrón–Di Nenno	Stupaczuk–Yanguas	Former Pairs	Galán–Lebrón	Paquito–Sanyo	Lebrón–Paquito	Di Nenno–Stupaczuk
Coello–Tapia	—	10–5	4–0	3–0		1–1	2–0	4–0	1–0
Galán–Chingotto	5–10	—	2–0	2–2		—	—	1–0	7–0
Lebrón–Di Nenno	0–4	0–2	—	—		—	—	—	—
Stupaczuk–Yanguas	0–3	2–2	—	—		—	—	—	—
Former Pairs									
Galán–Lebrón	1–1	—	—	—		—	—	—	2–0
Paquito–Sanyo	0–2	—	—	—		—	—	—	—
Lebrón–Paquito	0–4	0–1	—	—		—	—	—	0–1
Di Nenno–Stupaczuk	0–1	0–7	—	—		0–2	—	1–0	—

=== Women's ===
Record	Ariana–Paula	Fernandez–Triay	Gonzalez–D. Brea	Araújo–Ortega	Former Pairs	Icardo–Salazar	Ortega–Triay	Ortega–Virseda
Ariana–Paula	—	6–5	3–1	3–2		1–0	—	1–0
Fernandez–Triay	5–6	—	5–3	1–0		0–1	—	1–0
B. Gonzalez–D. Brea	1–3	3–5	—	2–0		3–0	—	—
Araújo–Ortega	2–3	0–1	0–2	—		—	—	—
Former Pairs								
Icardo–Salazar	0–1	1–0	0–3	—		—	—	—
Ortega–Triay	—	—	—	—		—	—	—
Ortega–Virseda	0–1	0–1	—	—		—	—	—

Matchups involving Andrea Ustero and Delfina Brea, and subsequently Delfina Brea and Lucia Sainz, are not included, as these were merely temporary pairings that lasted for a total of three tournaments while Bea González was recovering from an injury.

== Draws ==
=== Men's Bracket ===
Round of 32
1	(Spain) Coello / (Argentina) Tapia	6	6
Q	(Spain) A. Sans / (Spain) M. Ortega	0	1
Q	(Spain) C. Marti / (Spain) P. Amaya	1	2
11	(Argentina) L. Capra / (Argentina) Maxi	6	6
10	(Spain) J.G. Diestro / (Argentina) Sanyo	7	6
WC	(Italy) L. Di Giovanni / (Italy) R. Sinicropi	6	4
34	(Italy) F. Dominguez / (Argentina) I. Piotto	3	0
5	(Spain) Paquito / (Spain) P. Cardona	6	6
8	(Spain) E. Alonso / (Spain) Momo	6	6
36	(Spain) D.G. Sanchez / (Spain) J. Munoz	2	4
29	(Italy) F. Dominguez / (Spain) E. Chamero	4	6
9	(Spain) A. Arroyo / (Spain) A. Ruiz	6	7
12	(Spain) F. Guerrero / (Spain) J. Bautista	6	7
20	(Spain) J. Rico / (Spain) L.H. Quesada	3	6
21	(Spain) J. Barahona / (Spain) T. Zapata	3	2
4	(Argentina) Stupaczuk / (Spain) Yanguas	6	6
3	(Argentina) Di Nenno / (Spain) Lebrón	6	6
Q	(Spain) D. Sastre / (Argentina) Lamperti	4	1
26	(Spain) J.J. Casas / (Spain) P. Fernandez	3	3
14	(United Arab Emirates) I. Jofre / (Argentina) J. Tello	6	6
16	(Argentina) A. Chozas / (Argentina) L. Augsburger	6	6
19	(Spain) G. Rubio / (Spain) P. Lijó	3	3
37	(Argentina) E. Torre / (Argentina) J.C. Belluati	6	5	1
6	(Spain) Coki / (Spain) J. Sanz	4	7	6
7	(Spain) J. Garrido / (Brazil) L. Bergamini	7	4	6
21	(Spain) J. Barahona / (Spain) T. Zapata	5	6	1
Q	(Portugal) M. Deus / (Portugal) N. Deus	4	4
13	(Argentina) Belasteguín / (Argentina) V. Libaak	6	6
15	(Spain) J. Leal / (Brazil) L. Campagnolo	6	4	6
Q	(Spain) P.H. Alvarez / (Argentina) R. Valenzuela	4	6	7
25	(Spain) A. Cepero / (Spain) M. Benitez	1	2
2	(Spain) Galán / (Argentina) Chingotto	6	6

Round of 16
1	(Spain) Coello / (Argentina) Tapia	6	7
11	(Argentina) L. Capra / (Argentina) Maxi	2	6
10	(Spain) J.G. Diestro / (Argentina) Sanyo	2	4
5	(Spain) Paquito / (Spain) P. Cardona	6	6
8	(Spain) E. Alonso / (Spain) Momo	6	6
9	(Spain) A. Arroyo / (Spain) A. Ruiz	2	4
12	(Spain) F. Guerrero / (Spain) J. Bautista	1	3
4	(Argentina) Stupaczuk / (Spain) Yanguas	6	6
3	(Argentina) Di Nenno / (Spain) Lebrón	6	6
14	(United Arab Emirates) I. Jofre / (Argentina) J. Tello	3	2
16	(Argentina) A. Chozas / (Argentina) L. Augsburger	3	4
6	(Spain) Coki / (Spain) J. Sanz	6	6
7	(Spain) J. Garrido / (Brazil) L. Bergamini	6	6
13	(Argentina) Belasteguín / (Argentina) V. Libaak	3	4
Q	(Spain) P.H. Alvarez / (Argentina) R. Valenzuela	6	5
2	(Spain) Galán / (Argentina) Chingotto	7	7

Quarter-Final
1	(Spain) Coello / (Argentina) Tapia	7	4	6
5	(Spain) Paquito / (Spain) P. Cardona	5	6	3
8	(Spain) E. Alonso / (Spain) Momo	3	6	3
4	(Argentina) Stupaczuk / (Spain) Yanguas	6	3	1
3	(Argentina) Di Nenno / (Spain) Lebrón	6	4
6	(Spain) Coki / (Spain) J. Sanz	1	1
7	(Spain) J. Garrido / (Brazil) L. Bergamini	4	0
2	(Spain) Galán / (Argentina) Chingotto	6	6

Semi-Finals
1	(Spain) Coello / (Argentina) Tapia	6	6
6	(Spain) E. Alonso / (Spain) Momo	3	3
3	(Argentina) Di Nenno / (Spain) Lebrón	1	4
2	(Spain) Galán / (Argentina) Chingotto	6	6

Finals
1	(Spain) Coello / (Argentina) Tapia	6	7
2	(Spain) Galán / (Argentina) Chingotto	4	5

=== Women's Bracket ===
Round of 32
2	(Spain) C. Fernandez / (Spain) G. Triay	6	4	6
Q	(Argentina) M. Goyeneche / (Spain) R. Barrera	3	6	0
10	(Spain) M. Borrero / (Argentina) V. Riera	7	3	6
22	(Spain) M. Lobo / (Spain) S. Saiz	6	6	7
26	(Spain) N. Aguilar / (Spain) T. Navarro	6	6
WC	(Italy) C. Pappacena / (Italy) M. Parmigiani	4	3
20	(Spain) J. Velasco / (Spain) N. Canovas	1	6
6	(Spain) A. Salazar / (Spain) J. Castello	6	7
7	(Argentina) C. Jensen / (Spain) T. Icardo	6	6
12	(Spain) M. Guinart / (Spain) V. Iglesias	2	2
25	(Spain) M. Barrera / (Spain) M. Caparros	6	6
24	(Spain) A. Cañellas / (Spain) M. Merino	2	3
27	(Italy) G. Marchetti / (France) L. Godallier	6	3
11	(Spain) B. Caldera / (Spain) L. Rufo	7	6
21	(Spain) A. Perez / (Spain) P. Martinez	1	2
4	(Spain) M. Ortega / (Portugal) S. Araújo	6	6
5	(Spain) L. Sainz / (Spain) P. Llaguno	6	6
18	(Argentina) J. Bidahorria / (Spain) M. Talavan	3	3
Q	(Spain) A. Soriano / (Spain) L. Manquillo	2	6	6
Q	(Italy) C. Baldi / (Italy) G. Dal Pozzo	6	4	7
15	(Spain) C. Mesa / (Spain) L. Martinez	6	6
16	(Russia) K. Sharifova / (Spain) M. Marrero	3	2
17	(France) A. Collombon / (Spain) A. Martinez	1	0
9	(Spain) A. Alonso / (Spain) A. Ustero	6	6
8	(Argentina) A. Osoro / (Spain) V. Virseda	7	6
13	(Spain) C. Goenaga / (Spain) S. Ruiz	5	1
14	(Italy) C. Orsi / (Spain) N. Rodriguez	7	6
23	(Spain) B. Las Heras / (Spain) S. Bellver	6	3
LL	(Spain) J. Bautista / (Spain) L. Arruabarrena	6	6
Q	(Spain) A.D. Gracia / (France) C. Touly	3	3
19	(Portugal) A. Nogueira / (Spain) M.R. Abajo	2	0
3	(Spain) B. Gonzalez / (Argentina) D. Brea	6	6

Round of 16
2	(Spain) C. Fernandez / (Spain) G. Triay	6	6
22	(Spain) M. Lobo / (Spain) S. Saiz	3	3
26	(Spain) N. Aguilar / (Spain) T. Navarro	2	1
6	(Spain) A. Salazar / (Spain) J. Castello	6	6
7	(Argentina) C. Jensen / (Spain) T. Icardo	6	6
25	(Spain) M. Barrera / (Spain) M. Caparro	3	4
11	(Spain) B. Caldera / (Spain) L. Rufo	1	3
4	(Spain) M. Ortega / (Portugal) S. Araújo	6	6
5	(Spain) L. Sainz / (Spain) P. Llaguno	6	6
Q	(Italy) C. Baldi / (Italy) G. Dal Pozzo	2	2
15	(Spain) C. Mesa / (Spain) L. Martinez	5	5
9	(Spain) A. Alonso / (Spain) A. Ustero	7	7
8	(Argentina) A. Osoro / (Spain) V. Virseda	6	6
14	(Italy) C. Orsi / (Spain) N. Rodriguez	0	1
LL	(Spain) J. Bautista / (Spain) L. Arruabarrena	1	3
3	(Spain) B. Gonzalez / (Argentina) D. Brea	6	6

Quarter-Final
2	(Spain) C. Fernandez / (Spain) G. Triay	6	6
6	(Spain) A. Salazar / (Spain) J. Castello	0	3
7	(Argentina) C. Jensen / (Spain) T. Icardo	6	4	6
4	(Spain) M. Ortega / (Portugal) S. Araújo	4	6	4
5	(Spain) L. Sainz / (Spain) P. Llaguno	5	6	1
9	(Spain) A. Alonso / (Spain) A. Ustero	7	4	6
8	(Argentina) A. Osoro / (Spain) V. Virseda	6	1
3	(Spain) B. Gonzalez / (Argentina) D. Brea	7	6

Semi-Finals
2	(Spain) C. Fernandez / (Spain) G. Triay	6	6
7	(Argentina) C. Jensen / (Spain) T. Icardo	3	2
9	(Spain) A. Alonso / (Spain) A. Ustero	0	2
3	(Spain) B. Gonzalez / (Argentina) D. Brea	6	6

Finals
2	(Spain) C. Fernandez / (Spain) G. Triay	6	5	*
3	(Spain) B. Gonzalez / (Argentina) D. Brea	7	2

== Results ==
=== First Round ===
Men's

Date	Winners	Score	Opponent	Refs.
2/12/2024	(Spain) Anton Sans Riola (Spain) Ivan Ramirez	2–6 / 6–2 / 6–2	(Spain) Jose Solano Marmolejo (Spain) Victor Mena Gil	
2/12/2024	(Spain) Carlos Marti (Spain) Pedro Melendez Amaya	6–3 / 6–3	(Spain) Francisco Gil Morales (Spain) Juanlu Esbri	
2/12/2024	(Italy) Lorenzo Di Giovanni (Italy) Riccardo Sinicropi	2–6 / 7–5 / 6–4	(Italy) Marco Cassetta (Spain) Miguel Angel Solbes	
2/12/2024	(Italy) Facundo Dominguez (Argentina) Ignacio Piotto	7–5 / 6–4	(Spain) Álvaro Melendez Amaya (Argentina) Cristian German Gutiérrez	
2/12/2024	(Spain) David Gala Sanchez (Spain) Jaime Muñoz	6–1 / 6–4	(Spain) Ignacio Vilariño (Spain) Mario Del Castillo	
2/12/2024	(Spain) Emilio Sanchez Chamero (Chile) Javier Valdes	7–5 / 6–1	(Spain) Jaime Fermosell (Italy) Simone Cremona	
2/12/2024	(Spain) Luis Hernandez Quesada (Spain) Javier Rico	6–3 / 6–4	(Italy) Aris Patiniotis (Spain) Jesus Moya	
2/12/2024	(Spain) Enrique Goenaga (Spain) Teodoro Zapata	7–5 / 6–1	(Spain) Guillermo Collado (Spain) Javier Martinez Vazquez	
2/12/2024	(Spain) Daniel Santigosa (Argentina) Miguel Lamperti	6–3 / 6–4	(Spain) Javi Ruiz (Spain) Victor Ruiz	
2/12/2024	(Spain) José Jimenez Casas (Spain) Pincho Fernandez	6–1 / 6–0	(Argentina) Agustin Gutiérrez (Spain) José Rico	
2/12/2024	(Spain) Gonzalo Rubio (Spain) Pablo Lijó	6–4 / 6–2	(Spain) Ignacio Sager (Spain) Salvador Oria	
2/12/2024	(Argentina) Eduardo Agustin Torre (Argentina) Juan Cruz Belluati	7–6 / 6–4	(Spain) Fran Ramirez (Spain) Mario Huete	
2/12/2024	(Spain) Javier García Mora (Spain) Javier Gonzalez Barahona	6–2 / 6–3	(Spain) Diego Gil Batista (Spain) Rafael Mendéz	
2/12/2024	(Portugal) Miguel Deus (Portugal) Nuno Deus	6–2 / 6–3	(Argentina) Federico Mouriño (Spain) Marc Quilez	
2/12/2024	(Spain) Pol Hernandez (Argentina) Ramiro Valenzuela	6–4 / 6–1	(Spain) Gerard Arnaldos (Spain) Jose Sanchez Serrano	
2/12/2024	(Spain) Alvero Cepero (Spain) Miguel Benítez	6–3 / 7–6	(Italy) Denis Perino (Spain) Jorge Ruiz Gutiérrez	

=== Round of 32 ===
Men's

Date	Winners	Score	Opponent	Refs.
4/12/2024	(Argentina) Agustín Tapia (Spain) Arturo Coello	6–0 / 6–1	(Spain) Anton Sans Riola (Spain) Ivan Ramirez	
3/12/2024	(Argentina) Lucho Capra (Argentina) Maxi Sánchez	6–1 / 6–2	(Spain) Carlos Marti (Spain) Pedro Melendez Amaya	
3/12/2024	(Spain) Jose García Diestro (Argentina) Sanyo Gutiérrez	7–6 / 6–4	(Italy) Lorenzo Di Giovanni (Italy) Riccardo Sinicropi	
4/12/2024	(Spain) Pablo Cardona (Spain) Paquito Navarro	6–3 / 6–0	(Italy) Facundo Dominguez (Argentina) Ignacio Piotto	
4/12/2024	(Spain) Eduardo Alonso (Spain) Momo Gonzalez	6–2 / 6–4	(Spain) David Gala Sanchez (Spain) Jaime Muñoz	
3/12/2024	(Spain) Alex Arroyo (Spain) Alex Ruiz	6–4 / 7–6	(Spain) Emilio Sanchez Chamero (Chile) Javier Valdes	
3/12/2024	(Spain) Francisco Guerrero (Spain) Jairo Bautista	6–3 / 7–6	(Spain) Luis Hernandez Quesada (Spain) Javier Rico	
4/12/2024	(Argentina) Franco Stupaczuk (Spain) Mike Yanguas	6–3 / 6–2	(Spain) Enrique Goenaga (Spain) Teodoro Zapata	
4/12/2024	(Spain) Juan Lebrón (Argentina) Martin Di Nenno	6–4 / 6–1	(Spain) Daniel Santigosa (Argentina) Miguel Lamperti	
3/12/2024	(United Arab Emirates) Iñigo Jofre (Argentina) Juan Tello	6–3 / 6–3	(Spain) José Jimenez Casas (Spain) Pincho Fernandez	
3/12/2024	(Argentina) Alex Chozas (Argentina) Leandro Augsburger	6–3 / 6–3	(Spain) Gonzalo Rubio (Spain) Pablo Lijó	
4/12/2024	(Spain) Coki Nieto (Spain) Jon Sanz	4–6 / 7–5 / 6–1	(Argentina) Eduardo Agustin Torre (Argentina) Juan Cruz Belluati	
3/12/2024	(Spain) Javi Garrido (Brazil) Lucas Bergamini	7–5 / 4–6 / 6–1	(Spain) Javier García Mora (Spain) Javier Gonzalez Barahona	
4/12/2024	(Argentina) Fernando Belasteguín (Argentina) Valentino Libaak	6–4 / 6–4	(Portugal) Miguel Deus (Portugal) Nuno Deus	
3/12/2024	(Spain) Pol Hernandez (Argentina) Ramiro Valenzuela	4–6 / 6–4 / 7–6	(Spain) Javi Leal (Brazil) Lucas Campagnolo	
4/12/2024	(Spain) Alejandro Galán (Argentina) Federico Chingotto	6–1 / 6–2	(Spain) Alvero Cepero (Spain) Miguel Benítez	

Women's

Date	Winners	Score	Opponent	Refs.
4/12/2024	(Spain) Claudia Fernandéz; Gemma Triay	6–3 / 4–6 / 6–0	(Argentina) Martina Fassio Goyeneche (Spain) Raquel Eugenio Barrera	
3/12/2024	(Spain) Marina Martinez Lobo (Spain) Sofía Saiz Vallejo	6–7 / 6–3 / 7–6	(Spain) Marta Borrero (Argentina) Virginia Riera	
3/12/2024	(Spain) Noemi Aguilar (Spain) Teresa Navarro	6–4 / 6–3	(Italy) Chiara Pappacena (Italy) Martina Parmigiani	
4/12/2024	(Spain) Alejandra Salazar (Spain) Jessica Castelló	6–1 / 7–6	(Spain) Jimena Velasco (Spain) Noa Canovas	
4/12/2024	(Argentina) Claudia Jensen (Spain) Tamara Icardo	6–2 / 6–2	(Spain) Marina Guinart (Spain) Victoria Iglesias	
3/12/2024	(Spain) Marta Barrera (Spain) Marta Caparrós	6–2 / 6–3	(Spain) Ariadna Cañellas (Spain) Melania Merino	
3/12/2024	(Spain) Beatriz Caldera (Spain) Lorena Rufo	7–6 / 6–3	(Italy) Giorgia Marchetti (France) Lea Godallier	
4/12/2024	(Spain) Marta Ortega (Portugal) Sofia Araújo	6–1 / 6–2	(Spain) Agueda Perez (Spain) Patricia Martínez	
4/12/2024	(Spain) Lucia Sainz (Spain) Patricia Llaguno	6–3 / 6–3	(Argentina) Julieta Bidahorria (Spain) Marta Talavan	
3/12/2024	(Italy) Caterina Baldi (Italy) Giulia Dal Pozzo	6–2 / 4–6 / 7–6	(Spain) Arantxa Soriano (Spain) Letizia María Manquillo	
3/12/2024	(Spain) Carla Mesa (Spain) Lucía Martínez Gomez	6–3 / 6–2	(Russia) Ksenia Sharifova (Spain) Marta Marrero	
4/12/2024	(Spain) Alejandra Alonso (Spain) Andrea Ustero	6–1 / 6–0	(France) Alix Collombon (Spain) Araceli Martinez	
4/12/2024	(Argentina) Aranzazu Osoro (Spain) Veronica Virseda	7–5 / 6–1	(Spain) Carmen Goenaga (Spain) Sara Ruiz Soto	
3/12/2024	(Italy) Carolina Orsi (Spain) Nuria Rodriguez	7–6 / 6–3	(Spain) Barbara Las Heras (Spain) Sandra Bellver	
3/12/2024	(Spain) Julia Polo Bautista (Spain) Lara Arruabarrena	6–3 / 6–3	(Spain) Ana Dominguez Gracia (France) Carla Touly	
4/12/2024	(Spain) Bea González (Argentina) Delfina Brea	6–2 / 6–0	(Portugal) Ana Catarina Nogueira (Spain) Laia Rodriguez Abajo	

=== Round of 16 ===
Men's

Date	Winners	Score	Opponent	Refs.
5/12/2024	(Argentina) Agustín Tapia (Spain) Arturo Coello	6–2 / 7–6	(Argentina) Lucho Capra (Argentina) Maxi Sánchez	
5/12/2024	(Spain) Pablo Cardona (Spain) Paquito Navarro	6–2 / 6–4	(Spain) Jose García Diestro (Argentina) Sanyo Gutiérrez	
5/12/2024	(Spain) Eduardo Alonso (Spain) Momo Gonzalez	6–2 / 6–4	(Spain) Alex Arroyo (Spain) Alex Ruiz	
5/12/2024	(Argentina) Franco Stupaczuk (Spain) Mike Yanguas	6–1 / 6–3	(Spain) Francisco Guerrero (Spain) Jairo Bautista	
5/12/2024	(Spain) Juan Lebrón (Argentina) Martin Di Nenno	6–3 / 6–2	(United Arab Emirates) Iñigo Jofre (Argentina) Juan Tello	
5/12/2024	(Spain) Coki Nieto (Spain) Jon Sanz	6–3 / 6–4	(Argentina) Alex Chozas (Argentina) Leandro Augsburger	
5/12/2024	(Spain) Javi Garrido (Brazil) Lucas Bergamini	6–3 / 6–4	(Argentina) Fernando Belasteguín (Argentina) Valentino Libaak	
5/12/2024	(Spain) Alejandro Galán (Argentina) Federico Chingotto	7–6 / 7–5	(Spain) Pol Hernandez (Argentina) Ramiro Valenzuela	

Women's

Date	Winners	Score	Opponent	Refs.
5/12/2024	(Spain) Claudia Fernandéz; Gemma Triay	6–3 / 6–3	(Spain) Marina Martinez Lobo (Spain) Sofía Saiz Vallejo	
5/12/2024	(Spain) Alejandra Salazar (Spain) Jessica Castelló	6–2 / 6–1	(Spain) Noemi Aguilar (Spain) Teresa Navarro	
5/12/2024	(Argentina) Claudia Jensen (Spain) Tamara Icardo	6–3 / 6–4	(Spain) Marta Barrera (Spain) Marta Caparrós	
5/12/2024	(Spain) Marta Ortega (Portugal) Sofia Araújo	6–1 / 6–3	(Spain) Beatriz Caldera (Spain) Lorena Rufo	
5/12/2024	(Spain) Lucia Sainz (Spain) Patricia Llaguno	6–2 / 6–2	(Italy) Caterina Baldi (Italy) Giulia Dal Pozzo	
5/12/2024	(Spain) Alejandra Alonso (Spain) Andrea Ustero	7–5 / 7–5	(Spain) Carla Mesa (Spain) Lucía Martínez Gomez	
5/12/2024	(Argentina) Aranzazu Osoro (Spain) Veronica Virseda	6–0 / 6–1	(Italy) Carolina Orsi (Spain) Nuria Rodriguez	
5/12/2024	(Spain) Bea González (Argentina) Delfina Brea	6–1 / 6–3	(Spain) Julia Polo Bautista (Spain) Lara Arruabarrena	

=== Quarter-Finals ===
Men's

Date	Winners	Score	Opponent	Refs.
6/12/2024	(Argentina) Agustín Tapia (Spain) Arturo Coello	7–5 / 4–6 / 6–3	(Spain) Pablo Cardona (Spain) Paquito Navarro	
6/12/2024	(Spain) Eduardo Alonso (Spain) Momo Gonzalez	3–6 / 6–3 / 3–1 / W.O.	(Argentina) Franco Stupaczuk (Spain) Mike Yanguas	
6/12/2024	(Spain) Juan Lebrón (Argentina) Martin Di Nenno	6–1 / 4–1 / W.O.	(Spain) Coki Nieto (Spain) Jon Sanz	
6/12/2024	(Spain) Alejandro Galán (Argentina) Federico Chingotto	6–4 / 6–0	(Spain) Javi Garrido (Brazil) Lucas Bergamini	

Women's

Date	Winners	Score	Opponent	Refs.
6/12/2024	(Spain) Claudia Fernandéz; Gemma Triay	6–0 / 6–3	(Spain) Alejandra Salazar (Spain) Jessica Castelló	
6/12/2024	(Argentina) Claudia Jensen (Spain) Tamara Icardo	6–4 / 4–6 / 6–4	(Spain) Marta Ortega (Portugal) Sofia Araújo	
6/12/2024	(Spain) Alejandra Alonso (Spain) Andrea Ustero	7–5 / 4–6 / 6–1	(Spain) Lucia Sainz (Spain) Patricia Llaguno	
6/12/2024	(Spain) Bea González (Argentina) Delfina Brea	7–6 / 6–1	(Argentina) Aranzazu Osoro (Spain) Veronica Virseda	

=== Semi-Finals ===
Men's

Date	Winners	Score	Opponent	Refs.
7/12/2024	(Argentina) Agustín Tapia (Spain) Arturo Coello	6–3 / 6–3	(Spain) Eduardo Alonso (Spain) Momo Gonzalez	
7/12/2024	(Spain) Alejandro Galán (Argentina) Federico Chingotto	6–1 / 6–4	(Spain) Juan Lebrón (Argentina) Martin Di Nenno	

Women's

Date	Winners	Score	Opponent	Refs.
7/12/2024	(Spain) Claudia Fernandéz; Gemma Triay	6–3 / 6–2	(Argentina) Claudia Jensen (Spain) Tamara Icardo	
7/12/2024	(Spain) Bea González (Argentina) Delfina Brea	6–0 / 6–2	(Spain) Alejandra Alonso (Spain) Andrea Ustero	

=== Finals ===
Men's

Date	Winners	Score	Opponent	Refs.
8/12/2024	(Argentina) Agustín Tapia (Spain) Arturo Coello	6–4 / 7–5	(Spain) Alejandro Galán (Argentina) Federico Chingotto	

Women's

Date	Winners	Score	Opponent	Refs.
8/12/2024	(Spain) Claudia Fernandéz; Gemma Triay	6–7 / 5–2 / W.O.	(Spain) Bea González (Argentina) Delfina Brea	
