= 2024 Brussels P2 =

Padel championships

- Date: 20 April – 28 April
- Edition: 1st
- Category: P2
- Prize money: €235.000
- Location: Brussels, Belgium
- Venue: Gare Maritime

Champions
- Men's doubles: (Spain) Alejandro Galán (Argentina) Federico Chingotto
- Women's doubles: (Spain) Bea Gonzalez (Argentina) Delfina Brea

Chronology

The 2024 Brussels P2 (officially 2024 Lotto Brussels Premier Padel P2 Presented By Belfius) was the fifth tournament of the third season organized by Premier Padel, promoted by the International Padel Federation, and with the financial backing of Nasser Al-Khelaïfi's Qatar Sports Investments, now serving as the premier padel circuit.

In the women's division, the second and third ranked pairs met in the finals, wit Bea Gonzalez and Delfina Brea (No. 2) defeating Claudia Fernandez and Gemma Triay, winning their second consecutive title of the season.

In the men's division, Alejandro Galán and Federico Chingotto, reached the finals again in their second tournament as a team, and defeated the No. 1 FIP ranked team, Agustín Tapia and Arturo Coello, to claim their first title as a pair. This win allowed them to cut the distance to the second ranking spot.

== Relevant Data ==
After playing with Momo González in the Puerto Cabello P2, Juan Lebrón opted to reform the partnership with Paquito Navarro. Lebrón and Paquito had played together through 2019, playing 17 tournaments together, reaching 10 finals, winning 5 titles and finishing the year as the No. 1 ranked team. Together they started as the second seeded team.

With Lebrón and Paquito renewing their partnership, Paquito's former partner, Sanyo Gutiérrez, also opted to revive a successful pairing by joining forces with Maxi Sánchez. Maxi and Sanyo had already enjoyed success together, particularly between 2018 and 2019, dethroning Fernando Belasteguín and Pablo Lima in 2018 to become the first non-Belasteguín team to be ranked as the world number one pair since 2002. Across those two years they played 34 tournaments togehter, reaching 19 finals and winning 13 titles.

Álex Ruiz and Momo González also reformed their partnership, after Ruiz partner Juan Tello joined forces with Fernando Belasteguín in his last year as a professional player.

== Seeds ==
Male

Rnk.	Team	FIP Ranking Points
1	(Argentina) Agustín Tapia (Spain) Arturo Coello	24198
2	(Argentina) Juan Lebrón (Spain) Paquito Navarro	18667
3	(Spain) Alejandro Galán (Argentina) Federico Chingotto	17979
4	(Argentina) Franco Stupaczuk (Argentina) Martin Di Nenno	17946
5	(Spain) Javi Garrido (Argentina) Miguel Yanguas	7344
6	(Argentina) Aléx Ruiz (Spain) Momo Gonzalez	6993
7	(Argentina) Maxi Sanchéz (Argentina) Sanyo Gutiérrez	6704
8	(Spain) Coki Jorge (Spain) Jon Sanz	5987
9	(Brazil) Lucas Bergamini (Spain) Victor Ruiz	5285
10	(Argentina) Juan Tello (Spain) Miguel Semmler	4589
11	(Spain) Alejandro Arroyo (Spain) Eduardo Alonso	3660
12	(Spain) Francisco Gil Morales (Argentina) Ramiro Moyano	3397
13	(Argentina) Alex Chozas (Argentina) Lucho Capra	3186
14	(Spain) Javier Leal (Brazil) Lucas Campagnolo	2858
15	(Spain) Javier Rico (Spain) Juanlu Esbri	2811
16	(Argentina) Gonzalo Rubio (Spain) Jairo Bautista	2700

Female

Rnk.	Team	FIP Ranking Points
1	(Spain) Ariana Sanchez (Spain) Paula Josemaria	25274
2	(Spain) Beatriz Gonzalez (Argentina) Delfina Brea	17493
3	(Spain) Gemma Triay (Spain) Claudia Fernandez	11865
4	(Spain) Alejandra Salazar (Spain) Tamara Icardo	10564
5	(Spain) Marta Ortega (Spain) Veronica Virseda	10527
6	(Argentina) Claudia Jensen (Spain) Jessica Castello	9286
7	(Portugal) Sofia Araújo (Argentina) Virginia Riera	8781
8	(Argentina) Lucia Sainz (Spain) Patty Llaguno	5672
9	(Spain) Barbara Las Heras (Spain) Victoria Iglesias	5660
10	(Argentina) Aranzazu Osoro (Spain) Carmen Goenaga	5169
11	(Spain) Alejandra Alonso (Spain) Andrea Ustero	2785
12	(Spain) Beatriz Caldera (Spain) Lorena Rufo	2762
13	(Portugal) Ana Catarina Nogueira (Spain) Marta Talavan	2748
14	(France) Alix Collombon (Argentina) Julieta Bidahorria	2670
15	(Italy) Carolina Orsi (Sweden) Carolina Navarro	2589
16	(Russia) Ksenia Sharifova (Spain) Lucia Martinez	2447

== Head-to-head record between teams ranked in the top 4 during the season ==
=== Man's ===
Event	Coello–Tapia	Galán–Chingotto	Lebrón–Paquito	Di Nenno–Stupaczuk	Former Pairs	Galán–Lebrón	Paquito–Sanyo
Coello–Tapia	—	1–1	—	—		1–1	2–0
Galán–Chingotto	1–1	—	—	1–0		—	—
Lebrón–Paquito	—	—	—	—		—	—
Di Nenno–Stupaczuk	—	0–1	—	—		0–2	—
Former Pairs							
Galán–Lebrón	1–1	—	—	2–0		—	—
Paquito–Sanyo	0–2	—	—	—		—	—

=== Women's ===
Event	Ariana–Paula	Gonzalez–D. Brea	Fernandez–Triay	Icardo–Salazar	Former Pairs	Ortega–Triay	Ortega–Virseda
Ariana–Paula	—	1–0	1–1	1–0		—	1–0
B. Gonzalez–D. Brea	0–1	—	1–0	2–0		—	—
Fernandez–Triay	1–1	0–1	—	0–1		—	—
Icardo–Salazar	0–1	0–2	1–0	—		—	—
Former Pairs							
Ortega–Triay	—	—	—	—		—	—
Ortega–Virseda	0–1	—	—	—		—	—

== Draws ==
=== Men's Bracket ===
Round of 32
1	(Spain) Coello / (Argentina) Tapia	6	6
Q	(Spain) J.J. Casas / (Spain) M. Del Castillo	4	4
LL	(Spain) A. Luque / (Spain) J.L. Gonzalez	6	4	4
13	(Argentina) A. Chozas / (Argentina) L. Capra	3	6	6
19	(Argentina) J.C. Belluati / (Argentina) M. Lamperti	6	6
21	(Spain) I. Sager / (Spain) S. Oria	4	4
10	(Argentina) J. Tello / (Spain) M. Semmler	6	3
6	(Spain) A. Ruiz / (Spain) Momo	7	6
5	(Spain) J. Garrido / (Spain) Yanguas	6	7
Q	(Spain) A. Cepero / (Spain) M. Benitez	3	5
25	(Spain) A. Ayats / (Spain) F. Guerrero	4	7	3
14	(Spain) J. Leal / (Brazil) L. Campagnolo	6	6	6
12	(Spain) F. Gil / (Argentina) R. Moyano	6	6
22	(Spain) E. Goenaga / (Spain) T. Zapata	4	4
18	(Argentina) A. Gutiérrez / (Spain) J. Rico	3	3
4	(Argentina) F. Stupaczuk / (Argentina) Di Nenno	6	6
3	(Spain) Galán / (Argentina) F. Chingotto	6	6
11	(Spain) A. Arroyo / (Spain) E. Alonso	3	4
23	(Spain) J.G. Barahona / (Spain) P. Fernandez	1	3
16	(Spain) G. Rubio / (Spain) J. Bautista	6	6
20	(Spain) J.G. Diestro / (Spain) P. Lijó	4	2
26	(Spain) E. Chamero / (Spain) P.G. Rodrigo	6	6
WC	(Belgium) C. Geens / (Belgium) M. Deloyer	2	3
7	(Argentina) Maxi / (Argentina) Sanyo	6	6
8	(Spain) Coki / (Spain) J. Sanz	7	6
15	(Spain) J. Rico / (Spain) J. Esbri	5	2
Q	(Sweden) D. Windahl / (Spain) J. Marmolejo	7	7
Q	(Spain) D. Gil / (Argentina) C.G. Gutiérrez	5	5
17	(Spain) J. Ruiz / (Spain) P. Cardona	6	6
WC	(Belgium) B. Coene / (Belgium) J. De Weerdt	2	2
24	(Spain) J. Munoz / (Spain) J. Garcia	6	5	1
2	(Spain) Lebrón / (Spain) Paquito	3	7	6

Round of 16
1	(Spain) Coello / (Argentina) Tapia	6	5	6
13	(Argentina) A. Chozas / (Argentina) L. Capra	3	7	4
19	(Argentina) J.C. Belluati / (Argentina) M. Lamperti	7	6	7
6	(Spain) A. Ruiz / (Spain) Momo	6	7	6
5	(Spain) J. Garrido / (Spain) Yanguas	6	3	6
14	(Spain) J. Leal / (Brazil) L. Campagnolo	3	6	2
12	(Spain) F. Gil / (Argentina) R. Moyano	0	4
4	(Argentina) F. Stupaczuk / (Argentina) Di Nenno	6	6
3	(Spain) Galán / (Argentina) F. Chingotto	6	6
16	(Spain) G. Rubio / (Spain) J. Bautista	0	3
26	(Spain) E. Chamero / (Spain) P.G. Rodrigo	7	7
7	(Argentina) Maxi / (Argentina) Sanyo	6	6
8	(Spain) Coki / (Spain) J. Sanz	4	6	6
Q	(Sweden) D. Windahl / (Spain) J. Marmolejo	6	1	4
17	(Spain) J. Ruiz / (Spain) P. Cardona	2	3
2	(Spain) Lebrón / (Spain) Paquito	6	6

Quarter-Final
1	(Spain) Coello / (Argentina) Tapia	4	6	7
19	(Argentina) J.C. Belluati / (Argentina) M. Lamperti	6	3	5
5	(Spain) J. Garrido / (Spain) Yanguas	1	6	6
4	(Argentina) F. Stupaczuk / (Argentina) Di Nenno	6	3	4
3	(Spain) Galán / (Argentina) F. Chingotto	6	6
26	(Spain) E. Chamero / (Spain) P.G. Rodrigo	3	3
8	(Spain) Coki / (Spain) J. Sanz	6	4	7
2	(Spain) Lebrón / (Spain) Paquito	3	6	5

Semi-Finals
1	(Spain) Coello / (Argentina) Tapia	6	6
5	(Spain) J. Garrido / (Spain) Yanguas	3	4
3	(Spain) Galán / (Argentina) F. Chingotto	7	6
8	(Spain) Coki / (Spain) J. Sanz	6	0

Finals
1	(Spain) Coello / (Argentina) Tapia	4	7	2
3	(Spain) Galán / (Argentina) F. Chingotto	6	6	6

=== Women's Bracket ===
Round of 32
1	(Spain) A. Sanchez / (Spain) P. Josemaria
Bye
15	(Sweden) C. Navarro / (Italy) C. Orsi	6	4	4
Q	(Spain) A. Cañellas / (Spain) T. Navarro	3	6	6
Q	(Spain) A. Soriano / (Spain) M. Goyenche	3	6	4
10	(Argentina) A. Osoro / (Spain) C. Goenaga	6	2	6
17	(Spain) E. Carnicero / (Spain) M. Lobo	2	4
6	(Argentina) C. Jensen / (Spain) J. Castello	6	6
8	(Spain) L. Sainz / (Spain) P. Llaguno	6	6
23	(Spain) M. Barrera / (Spain) M. Caparros	4	1
Q	(Spain) M. Borrero / (Spain) S. Bellver	3	5
18	(Spain) M.R. Abajo / (Spain) N. Rodriguez	6	7
12	(Spain) B. Caldera / (Spain) L. Rufo	1	6	2
11	(Spain) A. Alonso / (Spain) A. Ustero	6	4	6
Bye
3	(Spain) C. Fernandez / (Spain) G. Triay
4	(Spain) A. Salazar / (Spain) T. Icardo
Bye
9	(Spain) B. Las Heras / (Spain) V. Iglesias	7	2	6
13	(Portugal) A. Nogueira / (Spain) M. Talavan	5	6	7
22	(Spain) M. Merino / (Spain) S. Saiz	3	1
21	(Spain) J. Velasco / (Spain) N. Canovas	6	6
16	(Russia) K. Sharifova / (Spain) L. Martinez	2	5
7	(Portugal) S. Araújo / (Argentina) V. Riera	6	7
5	(Spain) M. Ortega / (Spain) V. Virseda	6	6
20	(Spain) Carla Mesa / (Spain) Sara Ruiz	3	1
19	(Spain) A. Martinez / (Spain) M. Guinart	6	7
Q	(Spain) A. Perez / (Spain) P. Martinez	2	6
14	(France) A. Collombon / (Argentina) J. Bidahorria	6	6
WC	(Belgium) A. Mestach / (Belgium) H. Wyckaert	2	3
Bye
2	(Spain) B. González / (Argentina) D. Brea

Round of 16
1	(Spain) A. Sanchez / (Spain) P. Josemaria	6	6
Q	(Spain) A. Cañellas / (Spain) T. Navarro	2	2
10	(Argentina) A. Osoro / (Spain) C. Goenaga
6	(Argentina) C. Jensen / (Spain) J. Castello	*
8	(Spain) L. Sainz / (Spain) P. Llaguno	6	6
18	(Spain) M.R. Abajo / (Spain) N. Rodriguez	2	3
11	(Spain) A. Alonso / (Spain) A. Ustero	0	7	3
3	(Spain) C. Fernandez / (Spain) G. Triay	6	5	6
4	(Spain) A. Salazar / (Spain) T. Icardo	6	6
13	(Portugal) A. Nogueira / (Spain) M. Talavan	3	2
21	(Spain) J. Velasco / (Spain) N. Canovas	2	5
7	(Portugal) S. Araújo / (Argentina) V. Riera	6	7
5	(Spain) M. Ortega / (Spain) V. Virseda	3	6	6
19	(Spain) A. Martinez / (Spain) M. Guinart
14	(France) A. Collombon / (Argentina) J. Bidahorria	2	0
2	(Spain) B. González / (Argentina) D. Brea	6	6

Quarter-Final
1	(Spain) A. Sanchez / (Spain) P. Josemaria	6	6
6	(Argentina) C. Jensen / (Spain) J. Castello	2	2
8	(Spain) L. Sainz / (Spain) P. Llaguno	3	6	0
3	(Spain) C. Fernandez / (Spain) G. Triay	6	4	6
4	(Spain) A. Salazar / (Spain) T. Icardo	6	6
7	(Portugal) S. Araújo / (Argentina) V. Riera	2	0
5	(Spain) M. Ortega / (Spain) V. Virseda	3	3
2	(Spain) B. González / (Argentina) D. Brea	6	6

Semi-Finals
1	(Spain) A. Sanchez / (Spain) P. Josemari	7	4	4
3	(Spain) C. Fernandez / (Spain) G. Triay	5	6	6
4	(Spain) A. Salazar / (Spain) T. Icardo	6	6	0
2	(Spain) B. González / (Argentina) D. Brea	3	7	6

Finals
3	(Spain) C. Fernandez / (Spain) G. Triay	4	4
2	(Spain) B. González / (Argentina) D. Brea	6	6

== Results ==
=== Round of 32 ===
Men's

Date	Winners	Score	Opponent	Refs.
23/4/2024	(Argentina) Agustín Tapia (Spain) Arturo Coello	6–4 / 6–4	(Spain) Jose Jimenez Casas (Spain) Mario Del Castillo	
24/4/2024	(Argentina) Alex Chozas (Argentina) Lucho Capra	3–6 / 6–4 / 6–4	(Spain) Antonio Luquezbr> (Spain) Jose Luis Gonzalez	
23/4/2024	(Spain) Juan Cruz Belluati (Argentina) Miguel Lamperti	6–4 / 6–4	(Spain) Ignacio Sager (Spain) Salvador Oria	
24/4/2024	(Spain) Alex Ruiz (Spain) Momo Gonzalez	7–6 / 6–3	(Argentina) Juan Tello (Spain) Miguel Semmler	
24/4/2024	(Spain) Javier Garridoz (Spain) Mike Yanguas	6–3 / 7–5	(Spain) Alvaro Cépero (Spain) Miguel Benítez	
24/4/2024	(Spain) Javi Leal (Brazil) Lucas Campagnolo	6–4 / 6–7 / 6–3	(Spain) Arnau Ayats (Spain) Francisco Guerrero	
23/4/2024	(Spain) Francisco Gil Morales (Argentina) Ramiro Moyano	6–4 / 6–4	(Spain) Enrique Goenaga (Spain) Teodorp Zapata	
23/4/2024	(Argentina) Franco Stupaczuk (Argentina) Martin Di Nenno	6–3 / 6–3	(Argentina) Agustin Gutiérrez (Spain) José Rico	
24/4/2024	(Spain) Alejandro Galán (Argentina) Federico Chingotto	6–3 / 6–4	(Spain) Alejandro Arroyo (Spain) Eduardo Alonso	
23/4/2024	(Spain) Gonzalo Rubio (Spain) Jairo Bautista	6–1 / 6–3	(Spain) Javier Gonzalez Barahona (Spain) Pincho Fernandez	
24/4/2024	(Spain) Emilio Sanchez Chamero (Spain) Pablo García Rodrigo	6–4 / 6–2	(Spain) Jose García Diestro (Spain) Pablo Lijó	
24/4/2024	(Argentina) Maxi Sánchez (Argentina) Sanyo Gutiérrez	6–2 / 6–3	(Belgium) Clément Geens (Belgium) Maxime Deloyer	
24/4/2024	(Spain) Coki Nieto (Spain) Jon Sanz	7–5 / 6–2	(Spain) Javi Rico (Spain) Juanlu Esbri	
24/4/2024	(Sweden) Daniel Windahl (Spain) Jose Solano Marmolejo	7–5 / 7–5	(Argentina) Cristian German Gutiérrez (Spain) Jorge Ruiz Gutiérrez	
23/4/2024	(Spain) Javi Ruiz (Spain) Pablo Cardona	6–2 / 6–2	(Belgium) Bram Coene (Belgium) Joris De Weerdt	
24/4/2024	(Spain) Juan Lebrón (Spain) Paquito Navarro	3–6 / 7–5 / 6–1	(Spain) Javier García Mora (Spain) Jaime Muñoz	

Women's

Date	Winners	Score	Opponent	Refs.
23/4/2024	(Spain) Ariadna Cañellas (Spain) Teresa Navarro	3–6 / 6–4 / 6–4	(Sweden) Carolina Navarro (Italy) Carolina Orsi	
23/4/2024	(Argentina) Aranzazu Osoro (Spain) Carmen Goenaga	6–3 / 2–6 / 6–4	(Spain) Arantxa Soriano (Spain) Martina Fassio	
23/4/2024	(Argentina) Claudia Jensen (Spain) Jessica Castelló	6–2 / 6–4	(Spain) Esther Carnicero (Spain) Marina Martinez Lobo	
24/4/2024	(Spain) Lucia Sainz (Spain) Patty Llaguno	6–4 / 6–1	(Spain) Marta Barrera (Spain) Marta Caparrós	
24/4/2024	(Spain) Marta Borrero (Spain) Nuria Rodriguez	6–3 / 7–5	(Spain) Laia Rodriguez Abajo (Spain) Sandra Bellver	
23/4/2024	(Spain) Alejandra Alonso (Spain) Andrea Ustero Prieto	6–1 / 4–6 / 6–2	(Spain) Beatriz Caldera (Spain) Lorena Rufo	
24/4/2024	(Portugal) Ana Catarina Nogueira (Spain) Marta Talavan	5–7 / 6–2 / 7–6	(Spain) Barbara Las Heras (Spain) Victoria Iglesias	
24/4/2024	(Spain) Noa Canovas (Spain) Jimena Velasco	6–3 / 6–1	(Spain) Melania Merino (Spain) Sofía Saiz	
24/4/2024	(Portugal) Sofia Araújo (Argentina) Virginia Riera	6–2 / 7–5	(Russia) Ksenia Sharifova (Spain) Lucía Martínez	
24/4/2024	(Spain) Marta Ortega (Spain) Verónica Virseda	6–3 / 6–1	(Spain) Carla Mesa (Spain) Sara Ruiz	
24/4/2024	(Spain) Araceli Martinez (Spain) Marina Guinart	6–2 / 7–6	(Spain) Agueda Perez (Spain) Patricia Martínez	
24/4/2024	(France) Alix Collombon (Argentina) Julieta Bidahorria	6–2 / 6–3	(Belgium) An-Sophie Mestach (Belgium) Helena Wyckaert	

=== Round of 16 ===
Men's

Date	Winners	Score	Opponent	Refs.
25/4/2024	(Argentina) Agustín Tapia (Spain) Arturo Coello	6–3 / 5–7 / 6–4	(Argentina) Alex Chozas (Argentina) Lucho Capra	
25/4/2024	(Spain) Juan Cruz Belluati (Argentina) Miguel Lamperti	7–6 / 6–7 / 7–6	(Spain) Alex Ruiz (Spain) Momo Gonzalez	
25/4/2024	(Spain) Javier Garridoz (Spain) Mike Yanguas	6–3 / 3–6 / 6–2	(Spain) Javi Leal (Brazil) Lucas Campagnolo	
25/4/2024	(Argentina) Franco Stupaczuk (Argentina) Martin Di Nenno	6–0 / 6–4	(Spain) Francisco Gil Morales (Argentina) Ramiro Moyano	
25/4/2024	(Spain) Alejandro Galán (Argentina) Federico Chingotto	6–0 / 6–3	(Spain) Gonzalo Rubio (Spain) Jairo Bautista	
25/4/2024	(Spain) Emilio Sanchez Chamero (Spain) Pablo García Rodrigo	7–6 / 7–6	(Argentina) Maxi Sánchez (Argentina) Sanyo Gutiérrez	
25/4/2024	(Spain) Coki Nieto (Spain) Jon Sanz	4–6 / 6–1 / 6–4	(Sweden) Daniel Windahl (Spain) Jose Solano Marmolejo	
25/4/2024	(Spain) Juan Lebrón (Spain) Paquito Navarro	6–2 / 6–3	(Spain) Javi Ruiz (Spain) Pablo Cardona	

Women's

Date	Winners	Score	Opponent	Refs.
25/4/2024	(Spain) Ariana Sánchez (Spain) Paula Josemaria	6–2 / 6–2	(Spain) Ariadna Cañellas (Spain) Teresa Navarro	
25/4/2024	(Argentina) Claudia Jensen (Spain) Jessica Castelló	W.O.	(Argentina) Aranzazu Osoro (Spain) Carmen Goenaga	
25/4/2024	(Spain) Lucia Sainz (Spain) Patty Llaguno	6–2 / 6–3	(Spain) Marta Borrero (Spain) Nuria Rodriguez	
25/4/2024	(Spain) Claudia Fernandez (Spain) Gemma Triay	6–0 / 5–7 / 6–3	(Spain) Alejandra Alonso (Spain) Andrea Ustero Prieto	
25/4/2024	(Spain) Alejandra Salazar (Spain) Tamara Icardo	6–3 / 6–2	(Portugal) Ana Catarina Nogueira (Spain) Marta Talavan	
25/4/2024	(Portugal) Sofia Araújo (Argentina) Virginia Riera	6–2 / 7–5	(Spain) Noa Canovas (Spain) Jimena Velasco	
25/4/2024	(Spain) Marta Ortega (Spain) Verónica Virseda	3–6 / 6–4 / 6–2	(Spain) Araceli Martinez (Spain) Marina Guinart	
25/4/2024	(Spain) Bea González (Argentina) Delfina Brea	6–2 / 6–0	(France) Alix Collombon (Argentina) Julieta Bidahorria	

=== Quarter-Finals ===
Men's

Date	Winners	Score	Opponent	Refs.
26/4/2024	(Argentina) Agustín Tapia (Spain) Arturo Coello	4–6 / 6–3 / 7–5	(Spain) Juan Cruz Belluati (Argentina) Miguel Lamperti	
26/4/2024	(Spain) Javier Garridoz (Spain) Mike Yanguas	1–6 / 6–3 / 6–4	(Argentina) Franco Stupaczuk (Argentina) Martin Di Nenno	
26/4/2024	(Spain) Alejandro Galán (Argentina) Federico Chingotto	6–3 / 6–3	(Spain) Emilio Sanchez Chamero (Spain) Pablo García Rodrigo	
26/4/2024	(Spain) Coki Nieto (Spain) Jon Sanz	6–3 / 4–6 / 7–5	(Spain) Juan Lebrón (Spain) Paquito Navarro	

Women's

Date	Winners	Score	Opponent	Refs.
26/4/2024	(Spain) Ariana Sánchez (Spain) Paula Josemaria	6–2 / 6–2	(Argentina) Claudia Jensen (Spain) Jessica Castelló	
26/4/2024	(Spain) Claudia Fernandez (Spain) Gemma Triay	6–3 / 4–6 / 6–0	(Spain) Lucia Sainz (Spain) Patty Llaguno	
26/4/2024	(Spain) Alejandra Salazar (Spain) Tamara Icardo	6–2 / 6–0	(Portugal) Sofia Araújo (Argentina) Virginia Riera	
26/4/2024	(Spain) Bea González (Argentina) Delfina Brea	6–3 / 6–3	(Spain) Marta Ortega (Spain) Verónica Virseda	

=== Semi-Finals ===
Men's

Date	Winners	Score	Opponent	Refs.
27/4/2024	(Argentina) Agustín Tapia (Spain) Arturo Coello	6–3 / 6–4	(Spain) Javier Garridoz (Spain) Mike Yanguas	
27/4/2024	(Spain) Alejandro Galán (Argentina) Federico Chingotto	7–6 / 6–0	(Spain) Coki Nieto (Spain) Jon Sanz	

Women's

Date	Winners	Score	Opponent	Refs.
27/4/2024	(Spain) Claudia Fernandez (Spain) Gemma Triay	5–7 / 6–4 / 6–4	(Spain) Ariana Sánchez (Spain) Paula Josemaria	
27/4/2024	(Spain) Bea González (Argentina) Delfina Brea	3–6 / 7–6 / 6–0	(Spain) Alejandra Salazar (Spain) Tamara Icardo	

=== Finals ===
Men's

Date	Winners	Score	Opponent	Refs.
28/4/2024	(Spain) Alejandro Galán (Argentina) Federico Chingotto	6–4 / 6–7 / 6–2	(Argentina) Agustín Tapia (Spain) Arturo Coello	

Women's

Date	Winners	Score	Opponent	Refs.
28/4/2024	(Spain) Bea González (Argentina) Delfina Brea	6–4 / 6–4	(Spain) Claudia Fernandez (Spain) Gemma Triay	
