= 2008 Fed Cup Asia/Oceania Zone Group II – play-offs =

The play-offs of the 2008 Fed Cup Asia/Oceania Zone Group II were the final stage matches of the Group II Zonal Competition involving teams from Asia and Oceania. Using the positions determined in their pools, the nine teams faced off to determine their placing in the 2008 Fed Cup Asia/Oceania Zone Group II. The top team advanced to Group I for the next year.

Placing	Pool A	Pool B
1	South Korea	Kazakhstan
2	Philippines	Singapore
3	Syria	Turkmenistan
4		Sri Lanka

== Promotion play-offs ==
The first placed teams of each pool were placed against each other in a head-to-head round. The winner of the round advanced to Group I for 2009.

=== South Korea vs. Kazakhstan ===
South Korea
2
National Tennis Development Centre, Bangkok, Thailand
2 February 2008
Plexipave (outdoors)

Kazakhstan
0

			1	2	3
1	(South Korea) (Kazakhstan)	Lee Jin-a; Madina Rakhim	6; 4	4; 1		retired
2	(South Korea) (Kazakhstan)	Lee Ye-ra; Amina Rakhim	3; 6	6; 2	7^{7} 6^{4}
3	(South Korea) (Kazakhstan)					not played

== Third to Fourth play-offs ==
The second-placed teams from each pool were drawn in head-to-head rounds to find the third and fourth placed teams.

=== Philippines vs. Singapore ===
Philippines
2
National Tennis Development Centre, Bangkok, Thailand
2 February 2008
Plexipave (outdoors)

Singapore
0

			1	2	3
1	(Philippines) (Singapore)	Dianne Matias; Vanessa Boey	6; 0	6; 0
2	(Philippines) (Singapore)	Denise Dy; Stefanie Tan	6; 2	6; 1
3	(Philippines) (Singapore)					not played

== Fifth to Sixth play-offs ==
The third-placed teams from each pool were drawn in head-to-head rounds to find the fifth and sixth placed teams.

=== Syria vs. Turkmenistan ===
Syria
1
National Tennis Development Centre, Bangkok, Thailand
2 February 2008
Plexipave (outdoors)

Turkmenistan
2

			1	2	3
1	(Syria) (Turkmenistan)	Kim Sadi; Marina Lidiya	6; 4	6; 0
2	(Syria) (Turkmenistan)	Line al-Ghannam; Anastasiya Prenko	0; 6	3; 6
3	(Syria) (Turkmenistan)	Lara Alsamman / Ranim Mkahal; Jenneta Halliyeva / Anastasiya Prenko	2; 6	2; 6

== Seventh ==
As there was only three teams from Pool A as opposed to the four from Pool B, the last-placed team from Pool B (Sri Lanka) had no equivalent to play against. Thus the Sri Lankans were automatically allocated seventh place.

== Final Placements ==
Placing	Teams
Promoted	South Korea
Second	Kazakhstan
Third	Philippines
Fourth	Singapore
Fifth	Turkmenistan
Sixth	Syria
Seventh	Sri Lanka

- South Korea advanced to the 2009 Fed Cup Asia/Oceania Zone Group I, where they placed sixth.

== See also ==
- Fed Cup structure
