= 2008 Fed Cup Asia/Oceania Zone Group I – Pool A =

Group A of the 2008 Fed Cup Asia/Oceania Zone Group I was one of two pools in the Asia/Oceania Zone Group I of the 2008 Fed Cup. Four teams competed in a round robin competition, with the top team and the bottom two teams proceeding to their respective sections of the play-offs: the top teams played for advancement to the World Group II Play-offs, while the bottom teams faced potential relegation to Group II.

		(Australia) AUS	(India) IND	(New Zealand) NZL	(Indonesia) INA	RR; W–L	Set; W–L	Game; W–L	Standings
18	Australia		3–0	2–1	1–2	2–1	11–6	105–78	2
21	India	0–3		1–2	1–2	0–3	7–15	86–116	4
35	New Zealand	1–2	2–1		3–0	2–1	12–5	98–76	1
39	Indonesia	2–1	2–1	0–3		0–3	8–12	82–101	3

== Australia vs. New Zealand ==
Australia
2
National Tennis Development Centre, Bangkok, Thailand
30 January 2008
Plexipave (outdoors)

New Zealand
1

			1	2	3
1	(Australia) (New Zealand)	Casey Dellacqua; Sacha Jones	4; 6	6; 4	4; 1	retired
2	(Australia) (New Zealand)	Alicia Molik; Marina Erakovic	6; 6			retired
3	(Australia) (New Zealand)	Casey Dellacqua / Rennae Stubbs; Leanne Baker / Marina Erakovic	7; 5	6; 2

== India vs. Indonesia ==
India
1
National Tennis Development Centre, Bangkok, Thailand
30 January 2008
Plexipave (outdoors)

Indonesia
2

			1	2	3
1	(India) (Indonesia)	Shikha Uberoi; Ayu-Fani Damayanti	6; 4	6; 1
2	(India) (Indonesia)	Sunitha Rao; Sandy Gumulya	1; 6	6; 3	3; 6
3	(India) (Indonesia)	Sunitha Rao / Shikha Uberoi; Ayu-Fani Damayanti / Sandy Gumulya	7^{7} 6^{5}	1; 6	3; 6

== Australia vs. Indonesia ==
Australia
1
National Tennis Development Centre, Bangkok, Thailand
31 January 2008
Plexipave (outdoors)

Indonesia
2

			1	2	3
1	(Australia) (Indonesia)	Jessica Moore; Ayu-Fani Damayanti	3; 6	4; 6
2	(Australia) (Indonesia)	Casey Dellacqua; Sandy Gumulya	6^{5} 7^{7}	6^{5} 7^{7}
3	(Australia) (Indonesia)	Casey Dellacqua / Rennae Stubbs; Vivien Silfany-Tony / Lavinia Tananta	6; 2	6; 1

== India vs. New Zealand ==
India
1
National Tennis Development Centre, Bangkok, Thailand
31 January 2008
Plexipave (outdoors)

New Zealand
2

			1	2	3
1	(India) (New Zealand)	Isha Lakhani; Sacha Jones	6^{7} 7^{9}	6; 1	6; 4
2	(India) (New Zealand)	Sunitha Rao; Marina Erakovic	0; 6	6^{7} 7^{9}
3	(India) (New Zealand)	Isha Lakhani / Shikha Uberoi; Leanne Baker / Marina Erakovic	2; 6	2; 6

== Australia vs. India ==
Australia
3
National Tennis Development Centre, Bangkok, Thailand
1 February 2008
Plexipave (outdoors)

India
0

			1	2	3
1	(Australia) (India)	Jessica Moore; Isha Lakhani	3; 6	6; 4	6; 1
2	(Australia) (India)	Casey Dellacqua; Sunitha Rao	6; 3	7; 5
3	(Australia) (India)	Casey Dellacqua / Rennae Stubbs; Sunitha Rao / Shikha Uberoi	7^{7} 6^{2}	6; 2

== New Zealand vs. Indonesia ==
New Zealand
3
National Tennis Development Centre, Bangkok, Thailand
1 February 2008
Plexipave (outdoors)

Indonesia
0

			1	2	3
1	(New Zealand) (Indonesia)	Sacha Jones; Ayu-Fani Damayanti	6; 4	7; 5
2	(New Zealand) (Indonesia)	Marina Erakovic; Sandy Gumulya	6; 3	6; 1
3	(New Zealand) (Indonesia)	Leanne Baker / Marina Erakovic; Vivien Silfany-Tony / Lavinia Tananta	6; 2	6; 0

== See also ==
- Fed Cup structure
