= 2008 Fed Cup Asia/Oceania Zone Group I – Pool B =

Group B of the 2008 Fed Cup Asia/Oceania Zone Group I was one of two pools in the Asia/Oceania Zone Group I of the 2008 Fed Cup. Four teams competed in a round robin competition, with the top team and the bottom two teams proceeding to their respective sections of the play-offs: the top teams played for advancement to the World Group II Play-offs, while the bottom teams faced potential relegation to Group II.

		(Chinese Taipei) TPE	(Thailand) THA	(Uzbekistan) UZB	(Hong Kong) HKG	RR; W–L	Set; W–L	Game; W–L	Standings
20	Chinese Taipei		3–0	1–2	2–1	2–1	13–8	98–80	2
22	Thailand	0–3		1–2	3–0	1–2	12–10	95–101	3
27	Uzbekistan	2–1	2–1		2–1	3–0	12–9	106–75	1
40	Hong Kong	1–2	0–3	1–2		0–3	4–14	56–99	4

== Chinese Taipei vs. Uzbekistan ==
Chinese Taipei
1
National Tennis Development Centre, Bangkok, Thailand
30 January 2008
Plexipave (outdoors)

Uzbekistan
2

			1	2	3
1	(Chinese Taipei) (Uzbekistan)	Hsieh Su-wei; Iroda Tulyaganova	7^{7} 6^{5}	3; 6	3; 6
2	(Chinese Taipei) (Uzbekistan)	Chan Yung-jan; Akgul Amanmuradova	0; 6	2; 6
3	(Chinese Taipei) (Uzbekistan)	Chan Yung-jan / Chuang Chia-jung; Vlada Ekshibarova / Albina Khabibulina	6; 1	7; 5

== Thailand vs. Hong Kong ==
Thailand
3
National Tennis Development Centre, Bangkok, Thailand
30 January 2008
Plexipave (outdoors)

Hong Kong
0

			1	2	3
1	(Thailand) (Hong Kong)	Nudnida Luangnam; Yang Zi-Jun	6; 4	7; 5
2	(Thailand) (Hong Kong)	Tamarine Tanasugarn; Zhang Ling	6; 3	6; 1
3	(Thailand) (Hong Kong)	Napaporn Tongsalee / Suchanun Viratprasert; Lam Po Kuen / Zhang Ling	7; 5	6; 4

== Chinese Taipei vs. Hong Kong ==
Chinese Taipei
2
National Tennis Development Centre, Bangkok, Thailand
31 January 2008
Plexipave (outdoors)

Hong Kong
1

			1	2	3
1	(Chinese Taipei) (Hong Kong)	Chan Chin-wei; Yang Zi-Jun	2; 6	4; 6
2	(Chinese Taipei) (Hong Kong)	Chan Yung-jan; Zhang Ling	6; 0	6; 1
3	(Chinese Taipei) (Hong Kong)	Chan Yung-jan / Chuang Chia-jung; Yang Zi-Jun / Zhang Ling	6; 3	6; 2

== Thailand vs. Uzbekistan ==
Thailand
1
National Tennis Development Centre, Bangkok, Thailand
31 January 2008
Plexipave (outdoors)

Uzbekistan
2

			1	2	3
1	(Thailand) (Uzbekistan)	Suchanun Viratprasert; Iroda Tulyaganova	6; 2	1; 6	0; 6
2	(Thailand) (Uzbekistan)	Tamarine Tanasugarn; Akgul Amanmuradova	3; 6	6; 4	2; 6
3	(Thailand) (Uzbekistan)	Tamarine Tanasugarn / Napaporn Tongsalee; Vlada Ekshibarova / Albina Khabibulina	7; 5	6; 4

== Chinese Taipei vs. Thailand ==
Chinese Taipei
3
National Tennis Development Centre, Bangkok, Thailand
1 February 2008
Plexipave (outdoors)

Thailand
0

			1	2	3
1	(Chinese Taipei) (Thailand)	Hsieh Su-wei; Nudnida Luangnam	6; 4	2; 6	6; 2
2	(Chinese Taipei) (Thailand)	Chan Chin-wei; Tamarine Tanasugarn	6; 4	2; 6	6; 1
3	(Chinese Taipei) (Thailand)	Chan Yung-jan / Chuang Chia-jung; Napaporn Tongsalee / Suchanun Viratprasert	6; 3	6; 0

== Uzbekistan vs. Hong Kong ==
Uzbekistan
2
National Tennis Development Centre, Bangkok, Thailand
1 February 2008
Plexipave (outdoors)

Hong Kong
1

			1	2	3
1	(Uzbekistan) (Hong Kong)	Albina Khabibulina; Lam Po Kuen	6; 0	6; 2
2	(Uzbekistan) (Hong Kong)	Vlada Ekshibarova; Zhang Ling	3; 6	4; 6
3	(Uzbekistan) (Hong Kong)	Akgul Amanmuradova / Iroda Tulyaganova; Yang Zi-Jun / Zhang Ling	6; 2	6; 0

== See also ==
- Fed Cup structure
