= Qatar Sports Investments =

Government-operated Qatari shareholding organization

Qatar Sports Investments (QSI)
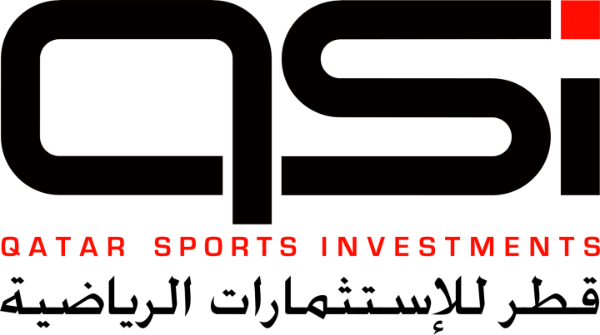
- Industry: Investment
- Founded: 2004
- Headquarters: Doha, Qatar
- Key people: Nasser Al-Khelaifi (chairman); Mohammed Al-Emadi (CEO); Adel Mustafawi (vice-chairman)
- Parent: State of Qatar
- Website: qsi.com.qa

Qatar Sports Investments (QSi) or Oryx QSi is a Qatari-government operated shareholding organization founded in 2004 and based in Doha, Qatar. Revenues from QSi ventures are reinvested into Qatar's sport, leisure, and entertainment sectors. QSi is led by Chairman Nasser Al-Khelaifi, Vice Chairman Adel Mohammed Tayyeb Mustafawi, CEO Mohammed Al-Emadi, and its board of directors has three additional members. According to Una Galani from Reuters, QSi "is thought to be owned by the Ministry of Finance of Qatar and the Qatar Olympic Committee." QSi is one of Qatar's major investment institutions, alongside the sovereign-wealth fund Qatar Investment Authority (QIA), and the Qatar Foundation.

== Board of directors ==
Nasser Al-Khelaifi has served as chairman of QSi since 2011, and is well known for his business ventures and various leadership roles in Qatar. He is currently chairman and chief executive officer of beIN Media Group in Qatar and president of Paris Saint-Germain Football Club (PSG) in France. As a former professional tennis player, he serves as president of the Qatar Tennis Federation (QTF) and vice president of the Asian Tennis Federation for West Asia (ATF).

Adel Mohammed Tayyeb Mustafawi serves as Vice Chairman of QSi and holds various other leadership positions within the Qatari banking industry. The additional three other board members include Yousif Mohammed Al-Obaidli, Mohammad Abdulaziz Al-Subaie, and Sophie Jordan, who are also member of beIN Media Group's board of directors.

== Portfolio ==
QSi has become increasingly involved in international sports and in the entertainment sector, especially as a key player in the French sports market with the completed acquisition of Paris Saint-Germain and its affiliates in 2011. QSi’s portfolio also includes Burrda, a Qatari sports brand and sports and leisure apparel supplier specialized in development and customization of actions established in 2007, and NextStep Marketing, a company specialized in client representations, direct merchandising, and event management among other things. On 10 October 2022, QSi bought 21.67% of the shares of S.C. Braga for €80 million. On 10 January 2023, QSi had enquired about the pre-purchase of West Ham United for April 2023.

== Investment projects ==
=== PSG takeover ===
In June 2011, Tamim bin Hamad Al Thani, the Emir of Qatar, bought 70% of the PSG's shares through state-run shareholding organization Qatar Sports Investments (QSI). QSI then became the club's sole owner in March 2012.

=== Deal with SC Braga ===
Qatar Sports Investments, a state-backed fund, will pay about €19mn for a 22 per cent stake in SC Braga, who sit third in Portugal’s top division. In October 2022, the Qatari investment fund that owns Paris Saint-Germain has bought a stake in a top-tier Portuguese football team, marking its first foray into multi-club ownership.

=== KAS Eupen takeover ===
In December 2025, Qatar Sports Investments announce its intention to acquire K.A.S. Eupen from the Qatari-owned Aspire Zone Foundation.

=== Padel ===
In 2023, Qatar Sports Investments acquired the World Padel Tour to create a new global circuit for padel, starting in 2024.
