= 2008 Fed Cup Asia/Oceania Zone Group II – Pool B =

Group B of the 2008 Fed Cup Asia/Oceania Zone Group II was one of two pools in the Asia/Oceania Zone Group II of the 2008 Fed Cup. Four teams competed in a round robin competition, with the teams proceeding to their respective sections of the play-offs: the top team played for advancement to the 2009 Group I.

		(Kazakhstan) KAZ	(Singapore) SIN	(Turkmenistan) TKM	(Sri Lanka) SRI	RR; W–L	Set; W–L	Game; W–L	Standings
50	Kazakhstan		3–0	3–0	3–0	3–0	18–1	114–28	1
60	Singapore	0–3		2–1	2–1	2–1	8–10	65–88	2
91	Turkmenistan	0–3	1–2		2–1	1–2	7–12	66–91	3
	Sri Lanka	0–3	1–2	1–2		0–3	4–14	56–94	4

== Kazakhstan vs. Turkmenistan ==
Kazakhstan
3
National Tennis Development Centre, Bangkok, Thailand
30 January 2008
Plexipave (outdoors)

Turkmenistan
0

			1	2	3
1	(Kazakhstan) (Turkmenistan)	Amina Rakhim; Anastasiya Prenko	6; 1	6; 3
2	(Kazakhstan) (Turkmenistan)	Valentina Starkova; Jenneta Halliyeva	6; 3	6^{3} 7^{7}	6; 2
3	(Kazakhstan) (Turkmenistan)	Amina Rakhim / Madina Rakhim; Ummarahmat Hummetova / Anastasiya Prenko	6; 0	6; 0

== Singapore vs. Sri Lanka ==
Singapore
2
National Tennis Development Centre, Bangkok, Thailand
30 January 2008
Plexipave (outdoors)

Sri Lanka
1

			1	2	3
1	(Singapore) (Sri Lanka)	Vanessa Boey; Nilupul Goonasekera	2; 6	4; 6
2	(Singapore) (Sri Lanka)	Stefanie Tan; Amreetha Muttiah	6; 4	7^{7} 6^{2}
3	(Singapore) (Sri Lanka)	Vanessa Boey / Stefanie Tan; Amreetha Muttiah / Mahesha Seneviratne	7; 5	6; 1

== Kazakhstan vs. Sri Lanka ==
Kazakhstan
3
National Tennis Development Centre, Bangkok, Thailand
31 January 2008
Plexipave (outdoors)

Sri Lanka
0

			1	2	3
1	(Kazakhstan) (Sri Lanka)	Tatyana Ignatchenko; Nilupul Goonasekera	6; 0	6; 3
2	(Kazakhstan) (Sri Lanka)	Amina Rakhim; Amreetha Muttiah	6; 1	6; 0
3	(Kazakhstan) (Sri Lanka)	Amina Rakhim / Madina Rakhim; Jithmie Jayawickrema / Mahesha Seneviratne	6; 0	6; 2

== Singapore vs. Turkmenistan ==
Singapore
2
National Tennis Development Centre, Bangkok, Thailand
31 January 2008
Plexipave (outdoors)

Turkmenistan
1

			1	2	3
1	(Singapore) (Turkmenistan)	Carolyn Ann Lim Hui; Anastasiya Prenko	1; 6	2; 6
2	(Singapore) (Turkmenistan)	Stefanie Tan; Jenneta Halliyeva	6; 2	6; 4
3	(Singapore) (Turkmenistan)	Vanessa Boey / Stefanie Tan; Ummarahmat Hummetova / Anastasiya Prenko	6; 2	6; 4

== Kazakhstan vs. Singapore ==
Kazakhstan
3
National Tennis Development Centre, Bangkok, Thailand
1 February 2008
Plexipave (outdoors)

Singapore
0

			1	2	3
1	(Kazakhstan) (Singapore)	Madina Rakhim; Vanessa Boey	6; 0	6; 1
2	(Kazakhstan) (Singapore)	Amina Rakhim; Stefanie Tan	6; 2	6; 1
3	(Kazakhstan) (Singapore)	Tatyana Ignatchenko / Valentina Starkova; Carolyn Ann Lim Hui / Laura Lim	6; 0	6; 2

== Turkmenistan vs. Sri Lanka ==
Turkmenistan
2
National Tennis Development Centre, Bangkok, Thailand
1 February 2008
Plexipave (outdoors)

Sri Lanka
1

			1	2	3
1	(Turkmenistan) (Sri Lanka)	Ummarahmat Hummetova; Jithmie Jayawickrema	0; 6	2; 6
2	(Turkmenistan) (Sri Lanka)	Anastasiya Prenko; Amreetha Muttiah	6; 0	6; 4
3	(Turkmenistan) (Sri Lanka)	Jenneta Halliyeva / Anastasiya Prenko; Jithmie Jayawickrema / Mahesha Seneviratne	6; 2	6; 4

== See also ==
- Fed Cup structure
