= Indonesian Tennis Association =

Governing body of tennis in Indonesia

Persatuan Lawn Tennis Indonesia
- Abbreviation: PELTI
- Formation: 26 December 1935
- Type: National Sport Association
- Headquarters: Jakarta
- General Chairman: Nurdin Halid
- Affiliations: ATF, ITF
- Website: www.pelti.org

The Indonesian Tennis Association is the governing body of tennis in Indonesia. It is known in Indonesian as PELTI (Persatuan Lawn Tennis Indonesia).

Founded on 26 December 1935, PELTI's roles include promotion of the game, providing funding for player development, organising junior and professional tournaments, and administering Indonesia's Billie Jean King Cup and Davis Cup teams.

In 2006, the Indonesia Fed Cup team qualified for World Group II, but refused to play Israel and forfeited their play-off match against the Israel Fed Cup team in Tel Aviv, and hence was relegated. Israel thus won by forfeit, and advanced to the 2007 Fed Cup World Group II. It was reported that the Indonesian Tennis Association was instructed to forfeit by the Indonesian government.

The International Tennis Federation's President Francesco Ricci Bitti said the Federation was saddened by the decision. The ITF fined the Indonesian Tennis Association $31,600, and banned it from 2007's tournament. The fine consisted of $20,000 to host Israel, $6,600 to compensate the ITF`s spending on preparations for the Israel Fed Cup, and $5,000 for pulling out of the match. Indonesia had been in the World Group II playoffs in 2007, but the sanction relegated Indonesia to Group II of the Asia/Oceanic Zone in 2008.

The current chairman is Nurdin Halid.
