= Turkmenistan Tennis Federation =

- Sport: Tennis
- Jurisdiction: National
- Abbreviation: TTF
- Founded: 1993
- Affiliation: International Tennis Federation
- Regional affiliation: Asian Tennis Federation
- Headquarters: Ankara str. 99
- Location: Ashgabat, Turkmenistan
- President: Azat Muradov
- Secretary: Eziz Dovletov

Official website
- www.ttf.gov.tm
- (Turkmenistan)

Turkmenistan Tennis Federation (TTF) (Turkmen: Türkmenistanyň Tennis Federasiýasy) is the governing body for professional and amateur tennis in Turkmenistan, was founded in 1993. It was originally accepted as member at the ITF in 2003. In 2004 became the full member of Asian Tennis Federation.

Turkmenistan Tennis Federation operates all of the Turkmenistan national representative tennis sides, including the Turkmenistan Davis Cup team, the Turkmenistan Fed Cup team and youth sides as well. TTF is also responsible for organizing and hosting all types of tennis tournaments in the Turkmenistan.
