= 2008 Fed Cup Asia/Oceania Zone Group II – Pool A =

Group A of the 2008 Fed Cup Asia/Oceania Zone Group II was one of two pools in the Asia/Oceania Zone Group II of the 2008 Fed Cup. Three teams competed in a round robin competition, with the teams proceeding to their respective sections of the play-offs: the top team played for advancement to the 2009 Group I.

		(South Korea) KOR	(Philippines) PHI	(Syria) SYR	RR; W–L	Set; W–L	Game; W–L	Standings
33	South Korea		2–1	3–0	2–0	10–2	64–23	1
72	Philippines	1–2		3–0	1–1	8–4	56–34	2
77	Syria	0–3	0–3		0–2	0–12	9–72	3

== South Korea vs. Syria ==
South Korea
3
National Tennis Development Centre, Bangkok, Thailand
30 January 2008
Plexipave (outdoors)

Syria
0

			1	2	3
1	(South Korea) (Syria)	Lee Jin-a; Ranim Mkahal	6; 1	6; 0
2	(South Korea) (Syria)	Lee Ye-ra; Line al-Ghannam	6; 1	6; 0
3	(South Korea) (Syria)	Kim So-jung / Yu Min-hwa; Lara Alsamman / Kim Sadi	6; 1	6; 0

== Philippines vs. Syria ==
Philippines
3
National Tennis Development Centre, Bangkok, Thailand
31 January 2008
Plexipave (outdoors)

Syria
0

			1	2	3
1	(Philippines) (Syria)	Czarina-Mae Arévalo; Ranim Mkahal	6; 1	6; 0
2	(Philippines) (Syria)	Denise Dy; Line al-Ghannam	6; 0	6; 2
3	(Philippines) (Syria)	Denise Dy / Dianne Matias; Lara Alsamman / Kim Sadi	6; 1	6; 2

== South Korea vs. Philippines ==
South Korea
2
National Tennis Development Centre, Bangkok, Thailand
1 February 2008
Plexipave (outdoors)

Philippines
1

			1	2	3
1	(South Korea) (Philippines)	Lee Jin-a; Czarina-Mae Arévalo	6; 3	6; 0
2	(South Korea) (Philippines)	Lee Ye-ra; Denise Dy	6; 3	6; 2
3	(South Korea) (Philippines)	Kim So-jung / Yu Min-hwa; Denise Dy / Dianne Matias	1; 6	3; 6

== See also ==
- Fed Cup structure
