= Uzbekistan Tennis Federation =

Sports governing body in Uzbekistan

- Sport: Tennis
- Jurisdiction: National
- Abbreviation: (UTF)
- Founded: April 15, 2002
- Affiliation: International Tennis Federation
- Affiliation date: 1993
- Regional affiliation: Asian Tennis Federation
- Headquarters: 1 Asaka Pereulok, House 14
- Location: Tashkent
- President: Rustam Inoyatov
- Secretary: Igor Shepelev

Official website
- www.tennis.uz
- (Uzbekistan)

Uzbekistan Tennis Federation (UTF) (Uzbek: O'zbekiston Tennis Federatsiyasi) is the governing body for professional and amateur tennis in Uzbekistan. It was originally accepted as associative member at the ITF in 1992. In 1993 UTF became the full member of ITF.

Uzbekistan Tennis Federation operates all of the Uzbekistan national representative tennis sides, including the Uzbekistan Davis Cup team, the Uzbekistan Fed Cup team and youth sides as well. UTF is also responsible for organizing and hosting all types of tennis tournaments in the Uzbekistan. Head of Alisher Mirsoatov.
