= Asian Tennis Federation =

Regional federation of national tennis organizations in Asia

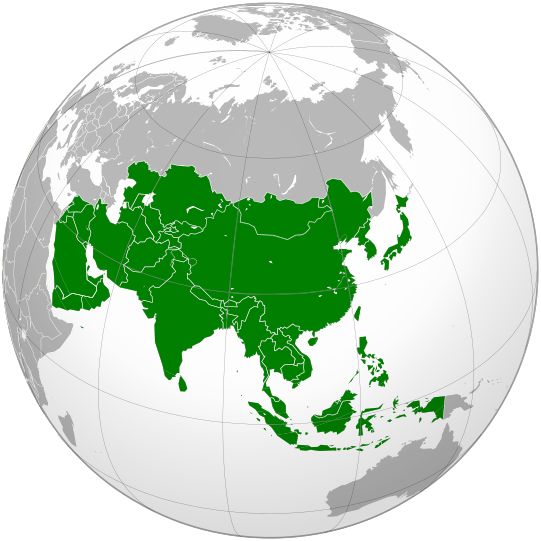
- Members of ATF
- Formation: 1958
- Type: Sport Association
- Headquarters: Continental Federations
- Location: 169, Electric Road 12/F Manulife Tower, North Point, Hong Kong, China
- Region served: Asia
- Members: 45 Asian nations
- President: Yuriy Polskiy
- Website: asiantennis.com

The Asian Tennis Federation (ATF) is a non-profit organization affiliated with the International Tennis Federation and was founded in 1958. It is a continental body of national tennis associations of Asian countries. The ATF's main objectives are to raise the quality standard of Asian tennis and to popularize tennis sport among the peoples of Asia. As of May 2024, the federation has 45 member associations who represents their respective nations. The ATF works closely with the International Tennis Federation (ITF) and supports its member associations through the implementation of a wide range of programs.

== Member Associations ==
The member associations of the ATF are

Region (members)	Area of Jurisdiction	Member Associations
East Asia ( 8 )	China; Hong Kong; Japan; South Korea; Macau; Mongolia; North Korea; Chinese Taipei	Chinese Tennis Association; Hong Kong, China Tennis Association; Japan Tennis Association; Korea Tennis Association; Macau Tennis Association; Mongolian Tennis Association; Tennis Association of the Democratic People's Republic of Korea; Chinese Taipei Tennis Association
Southeast Asia ( 11 )	Brunei; Cambodia; Indonesia; Laos; Malaysia; Myanmar; Philippines; Singapore; Thailand; Vietnam; Timor Leste	Brunei Darussalam Tennis Association; Cambodia Tennis Federation; Indonesian Tennis Association; Lao Tennis Federation; Lawn Tennis Association of Malaysia; Tennis Federation of Myanmar; Philippine Tennis Association; Singapore Tennis Association; Lawn Tennis Association of Thailand; Vietnam Tennis Federation
South Asia ( 8 )	Afghanistan; Bangladesh; Bhutan; India; Maldives; Nepal; Pakistan; Sri Lanka	Afghanistan Tennis Federation; Bangladesh Tennis Federation; Bhutan Tennis Federation; All India Tennis Association; Tennis Association of the Maldives; Nepal Tennis Association; Pakistan Tennis Federation; Sri Lanka Tennis Association
West Asia ( 13 )	Bahrain; Iran; Iraq; Jordan; Kuwait; Lebanon; Oman; Palestine; Qatar; Saudi Arabia; Syria; United Arab Emirates; Yemen	Bahrain Tennis Federation; Tennis Federation of Islamic Republic of Iran; Iraqi Tennis Federation; Jordan Tennis Federation; Kuwait Tennis Federation; Federation Lebanese De Tennis; Oman Tennis Association; Palestinian Tennis Association; Qatar Tennis Federation; Saudi Arabian Tennis Federation; Syrian Arab Tennis Federation; United Arab Emirates Tennis Association; Yemen Tennis Federation
Central Asia (5 )	Kazakhstan; Kyrgyzstan; Tajikistan; Turkmenistan; Uzbekistan	Kazakhstan Tennis Federation; Kyrgyzstan Tennis Federation; National Tennis Federation Of the Republic of Tajikistan; Turkmenistan Tennis Federation; Uzbekistan Tennis Federation

== Board of directors ==
The board of directors is the elected group of members from national tennis bodies of Asian nations. As of May 2024 the current list of members is:

Name	Designation
Yuriy Polskiy (Kazakhstan)	President
Iroda Tulyaganova (Uzbekistan)	Vice President Development
Jianbin Won (China)	Vice President East Asia
Tep Rithivit (Cambodia)	Vice President Southeast Asia
Salim Saifullah Khan (Pakistan)	Vice President South Asia
Tareq Darwish Zainal (Qatar)	Vice President West Asia
Eziz Dovletov (Turkmenistan)	Vice President Central Asia
Naser Al Marzooqi (UAE)	Treasurer
Anil Jain (India)	Member
Arij Almutabagani (Saudi Arabia)	Member
Cheon Jin Choi (Korea)	Member
Mirzan Mahathir (Malaysia)	Member
Ng Mui Soon Gilbert (Singapore)	Member
Philip Mok (Hong Kong, China)	Member
Sohaib Ismail (Jordan)	Member

== Challenges ==
Asia is the most populous continent but tennis still remains a sport under development. Besides a couple of Asian nations like India, China and Japan who have produced some successful players, tennis has historically had a smaller competitive presence. The only Asians to ever win a single tennis grand slam are Li Na from China ( French Open 2011 and Australian Open 2014), Naomi Osaka from Japan (Australian Open 2019 and 2021, US Opens 2018 and 2021), and Elena Rybakina from Kazakhstan (Wimbledon 2022). The only 2 nations that ever qualified for a Davis cup final are India(3) and Japan. No Asian nation has ever won the Davis Cup (excluding the Junior Davis Cups, 2 of which are won by Japan in 2011 and 2019).

Li Na grew up playing badminton and only switched over to tennis because a coach saw her potential for the sport. However, the poor quality of Chinese tennis coaching she received in her early days actually turned her against the sport. Eventually, Li Na quit for two years, only to come back when China's tennis authorities allowed her to take the reins and hire a coach of her liking without regards to the costs. "After Li Na had won the two grandslam tournaments, everyone start to know tennis in China. Especially in a country like China interest in the tennis sport is very much at the lead level compared to other Asian countries. If you weren't a lead level player, maybe you are wasting your time, taking away from study or education. But we've really seen in the last couple of years that mindset changing, in China in particular", said Ben Slack, Tennis Australia's head of international business.

The Women's Tennis Association announced in 2017 that it has signed a ten-year deal to move its finals tournament to Shenzhen, a city in southern China, starting the following year. The deal will also see the total prize money on offer double to a whopping US$14 million.

There are currently 289 futures and challengers in a year in Europe, while Asia by comparison only has 61 of these tournaments. South America, despite geographical challenges, has 81 ATP recognized tournaments The number of tournaments in Asia is increasing and with it the level of the sport.

== Events ==
=== Types ===
1. Asia Pacific Elite Trophy (U14)
2. ITF & ATF Development Activities - U18 (Asia Oceania Closed B1 ITF WTT Juniors) - U16 (Junior Davis and Fed Cup + Roland Garros Junior Series Tournament) - U14 (World Junior Tennis Competition + ITF ASIA 14 & UNDER DEVELOPMENT CHAMPIONSHIPS 2025 - Regional Qualifying Event + ITF Asia 14&U Development Championships - Finals + ATF 14&U Tournament - Grade A by Regions + GSPDP/ITF/ATF 14&U Team to Europe + 14&U Championships + GSPDP Asian 14U Junior Championships) - U12 (ATF 12&U Team Competition by Regions + ATF 12&Under Team Competition - Finals + ATF 12U Intercontinental Team Competition)
3. ATF 14&Under (Ind Tours)
4. ATF 16&Under (Ind Tours)
5. ATP Challenger
6. ATP Tour
7. Beach Tennis (Deactive)
8. ITF World Tennis Tour (Juniors)

=== Championships ===
1. Tennis at the Asian Games
2. Asian Tennis Championships (Deactive)
3. Asian Junior Tour (U18)
4. Asian U16/U14/U12 Championships Individuals
5. Asian U16/U14 Championships Team (Qualification for Junior Davis Cup and Junior Billie Jean King Cup and es:Copa Mundial de Tenis Juvenil)
6. Regional U12/U14/U16 Championships
7. Wheelchair Tennis (Qualification for World Team Wheelchair Tennis Cup)

ITF ASIA 14 & UNDER DEVELOPMENT CHAMPIONSHIPS 2025 - Regional Qualifying Event (WA & CA)

ITF ASIA 14 & UNDER DEVELOPMENT CHAMPIONSHIPS 2025 - Regional Qualifying Event (SA, SEA & EA)

ASIA PACIFIC ELITE 14U TROPHY 2025

ATF 14&U Series 1, Negeri Sembilan.

World Junior Tennis Competition - Girls 14&Under

World Junior Tennis Competition - Boys 14&Under

Junior Billie Jean King Cup A/O Pre Qualifying Event

Junior Davis Cup - A/O Pre Qualifying Event

ATF 16&Under

ATF 14&Under

Junior Billie Jean King Cup A/O Final Qualifying Events

Junior Davis Cup A/O Final Qualifying Events

ATF 12&U Team Competition - South Asia

ATF 14&U Tournament

GSPDP/ITF/ATF 14&U Team to Europe

GSPDP Asian 14U Junior Championships 2025

ATF 12U Intercontinental Team Competition

Asian Closed B1 ITF WTT Juniors

=== Junior Tour ===
==== Ind Events ====
16&Under

14&Under

12&Under

Asian Junior Championships

==== Team Events ====
12&Under Team Competition

12&Under Intercontinental Team Competition

=== U16 ===
The Asian U16 Tennis Championship is a junior tennis tournament for players under the age of 16, organized by the Asian Tennis Federation (ATF). The Asian Tennis Federation is a non-profit organization affiliated with the International Tennis Federation. The championship aims to provide a platform for young Asian tennis players to compete and develop their skills.

Organization: The championship is organized by the ATF.

Eligibility: It is open to players under the age of 16.

Purpose: It aims to provide a competitive environment for young Asian tennis players to develop their skills and talent.

Format: The championship typically includes various singles and doubles events for both boys and girls.

Venue: The championship is usually held in different locations across Asia.

== Sponsors of ATF ==
This is a list of official sponsors of ATF:

- Wilson
- California Products – Official Supplier of Court Surfaces
- Yonex – Official Racket of the Asian Tennis Federation
- Rebound Ace
- All India Tennis Association
- Lawn Tennis Association of Thailand
- Sri Lanka Tennis Association
- Qatar Tennis Federation
- Uzbekistan Tennis Federation

== See also ==
- West Asian Tennis Federation
- Junior Davis Cup and Junior Billie Jean King Cup
- Davis Cup
- Fed Cup
- ATP Cup
- World Team Cup
- es:Copa Mundial de Tenis Juvenil (U14)
- es:Campeonato Sudamericano de Tenis (U12/U14/U16)
- es:Copa Davis Juvenil
- es:Copa Fed Juvenil
