= Palestinian Tennis Association =

Governing body of tennis in Palestine

The Palestinian Tennis Association is located in Beit Sahour. The Palestinian Tennis Federation is located in Gaza Strip, The president of the Federation is Dr. Damen El Wahidi.
