= Nasser Al-Khelaifi =

Qatari businessman (born 1973)

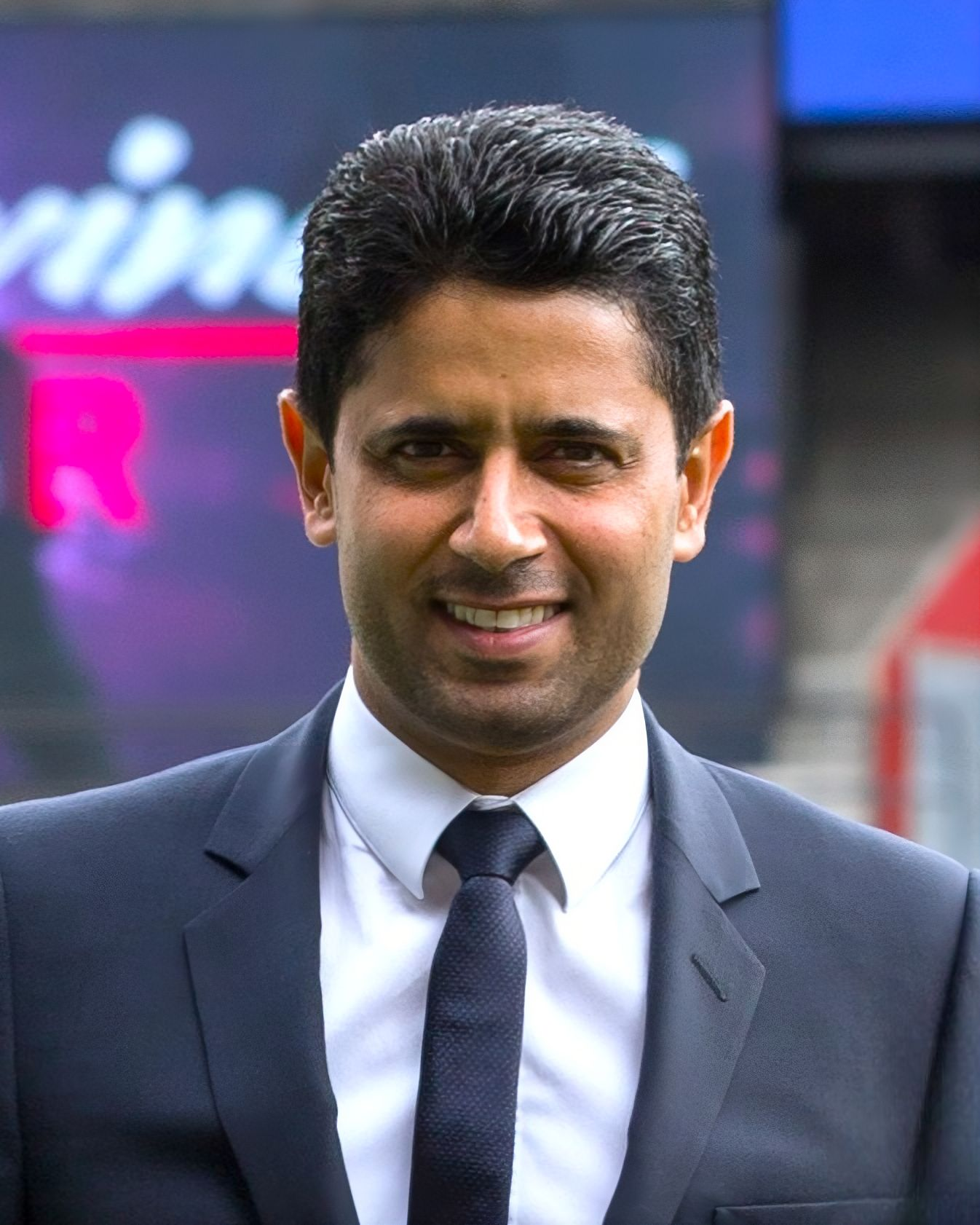
- Al-Khelaifi in 2017
- Full name: Nasser bin Ghanim Al-Khelaifi
- Native name: ناصر بن غانم الخليفي
- Country (sports): Qatar
- Born: 12 November 1973 (age 52) Doha, Qatar
- Turned pro: 1993
- Retired: 2004
- Plays: Right Handed

Singles
- Career record: 0–2 (at ATP Tour level, Grand Slam level, and in Davis Cup)
- Career titles: 0
- Highest ranking: No. 995 (4 November 2002)

Doubles
- Career record: 0–2 (at ATP Tour level, Grand Slam level, and in Davis Cup)
- Career titles: 0
- Highest ranking: No. 1040 (8 February 1993)
- Last updated on: 20 May 2013.

Nasser bin Ghanim Al-Khelaifi (Arabic: ناصر بن غانم الخليفي; born 12 November 1973) is a Qatari government official, businessman, and former professional tennis player. He is the chairman of beIN Media Group and Qatar Sports Investments, which are owned by the Qatari state, and the president of Paris Saint-Germain FC and the Qatar Tennis Federation.

Al-Khelaifi was also a member of the organizing committee for the FIFA Club World Cup, and has been a member of the UEFA Executive Committee since 2019. He was elected as the chairman of European Football Clubs (EFC) in 2021, and has been its representative on the FIFA Council since 2025.

Al-Khelaifi was recognised by ESPN as the seventh most influential individual in the realm of world football in 2015. His influence was further solidified in May 2020 when a France Football ranking positioned him as the most influential personality in the sport.

== Early life and education ==
Al-Khelaifi was born in Doha to an Arab family. He graduated with an Economics Degree from Qatar University and got his master's degree from the University of Piraeus.

Khelaifi befriended the current Emir of Qatar, Tamim bin Hamad Al Thani, when they were 14 and eight years old respectively, through tennis, which the two used to play together.

== Tennis career ==
=== Playing career ===
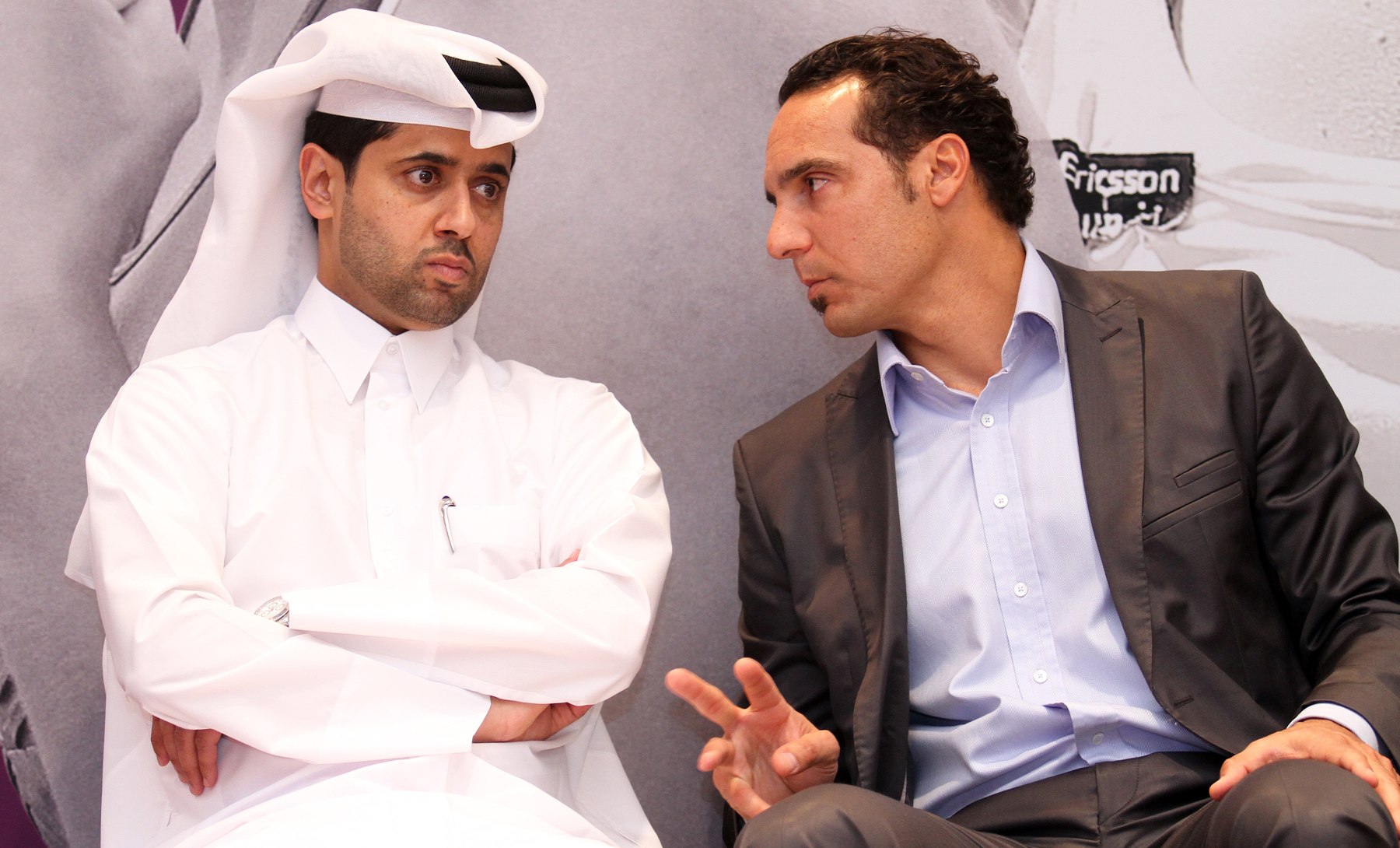
Al-Khelaifi and Karim Alami spectating the 2012 Qatar Open

As a tennis professional, Al-Khelaifi was the second most successful member of the Qatar Davis Cup team after Sultan Khalfan, playing 43 times between 1992 and 2002 and compiling a 12–31 record in singles, 12–16 in doubles. Al-Khelaifi appeared twice on the Association of Tennis Professionals (ATP) main tour, losing each time in his first round matches in St. Pölten in 1996 (where he lost to former French Open Champion Thomas Muster) and in Doha in 2002. He reached a career-high singles ranking of No. 995 in late 2002. He also won the GCC Team Tournament.

=== Post-playing career ===
Nasser Al-Khelaifi has been president of the Qatar Tennis Federation (QTF) since November 2008.

In 2011, he was elected vice-president of the Asian Tennis Federation (ATF) for West Asia.

== Business career ==
=== Qatar Sports Investments ===
Nasser Al-Khelaifi has been chairman of Qatar Sports Investments (QSi) since June 2011. QSi is a sovereign wealth fund dedicated to investments in the sport and leisure industry on a national and international level.

Following the QSi acquisition of Paris Saint-Germain F.C. (PSG) in June 2011, Nasser Al-Khelaifi became the chairman of the board of PSG and also CEO of the club, reinforcing Qatari interest in French football.

QSi has several other high-profile partnerships. QSi also owns the Burrda sportswear brand.

==== Paris Saint-Germain ====
Nasser Al-Khelaifi became the new president and chief executive officer of Paris Saint-Germain on 7 October 2011. Shortly after being named president, he presented a five-year plan to take Paris Saint-Germain to the top in France and abroad. As part of the long-term plan for the club, Al-Khelaifi brought in former footballer Leonardo as the new director of football.

Although Al-Khelaifi initially demanded a major trophy haul for the 2011–12 season, PSG were soon eliminated from the UEFA Europa League and both domestic cups, leaving the team only able to spend $130 million on players. PSG failed to dominate, and lost out to eventual winners Montpellier, though they qualified for the UEFA Champions League by finishing second.

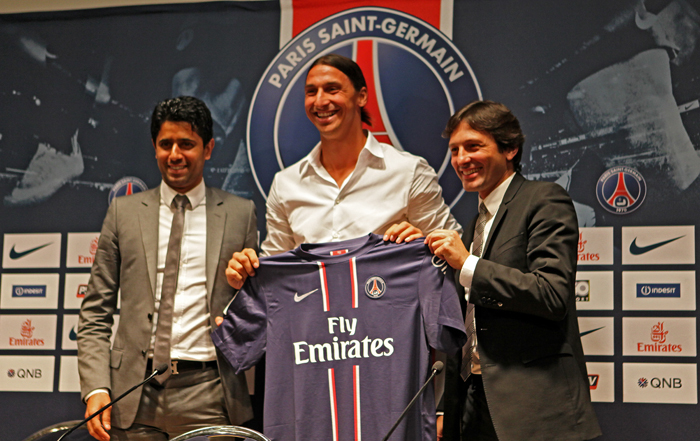
Zlatan Ibrahimović unveiled by Paris Saint-Germain sporting director Leonardo (right) and President Nasser Al-Khelaifi (left)

In the 2012–13 season, PSG won the Ligue 1 title and also made it to the quarter-finals of the UEFA Champions League, partly thanks to the goalscoring of newly signed striker Zlatan Ibrahimović. They eventually lost in a two-legged tie to FC Barcelona on away goals.

In the 2013–14 season, PSG again finished top of Ligue 1 with a record total of 89 points. They reached the quarter-finals of the UEFA Champions League where they lost to Chelsea 3–3 on aggregate, again going out only on the away goals rule.

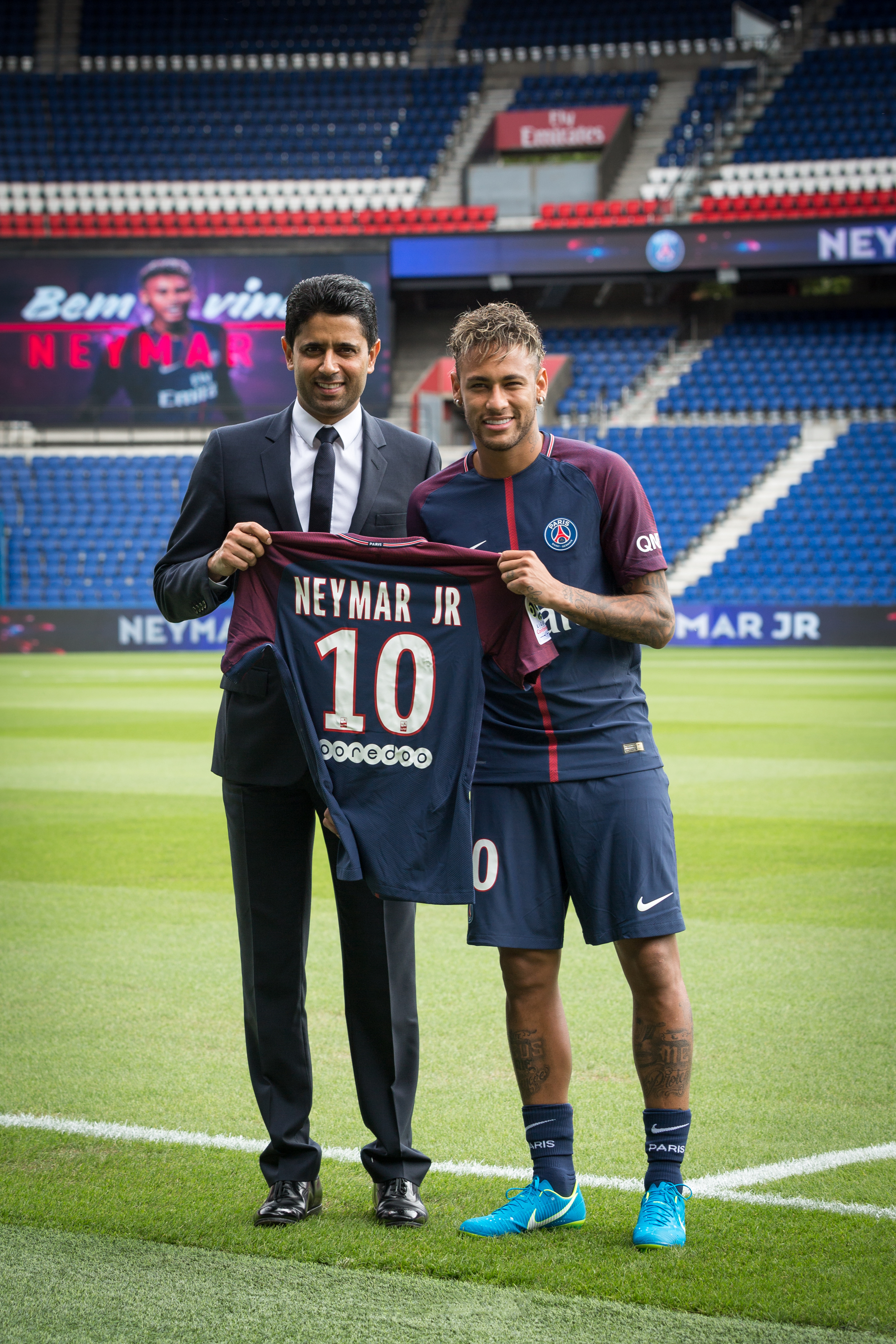
Nasser Al-Khelaifi (left) with Neymar in August 2017 in the Parc des Princes

In the 2018–19 UEFA Champions League knockout phase, they lost to Manchester United at home after leading with two goals at Old Trafford in the first leg. PSG lost at home 1–3 (3–3 on aggregate) and were knocked out by the away-goal rule.

In June 2025, after PSG won their first-ever UEFA Champions League title on June 1, marking a historic achievement for the club, Al-Khelaifi announced that he is considering moving the club from the Parc des Princes to a larger stadium outside Paris, such as Massy or Poissy, following the city's refusal to sell the Parc. The move aims to boost revenue with a bigger venue but risks alienating fans and weakening PSG's historic identity, especially as rivals like Paris FC gain momentum in the capital.

In June 2012, QSi acquired the Paris Handball Club and merged it with the PSG sport franchise. Since 2012, Paris Saint-Germain Handball has won the LNH Division 1 five times, while reaching the EHF Champions League final in 2016–17 and the semi-finals in 2015–16 and 2017–18.

=== BEIN Media Group ===
On 31 December 2013, Al Jazeera Sport's global operations were spun out of Al Jazeera Media Network (AJMN) and rebranded as beIN Sports. A few months later, beIN Media Group was incorporated and became the official owner of beIN Sports branded networks as well as all other non-news and current affairs assets originally belonging to AJMN. BeIN Sports has 22 channels, including 17 HD channels, and broadcasts across the Middle East, North Africa, Europe, North America, Australia, and Asia. The strategy, aside from building the BeIN premium sports network, is to develop the group's ambitions in sports and entertainment in production, distribution, and digital media sectors.

In October 2017, the Swiss courts opened an investigation against him for suspicion of private corruption in the allocation of television rights for the World Cups 2026 and 2030 for the Middle East and North Africa international media market.

On 30 October 2020, Nasser Al-Khelaifi was cleared of charges of aggravated criminal mismanagement for his alleged part in a corruption trial involving former FIFA general secretary Jerome Valcke. However, he was found guilty of forging documents related to television rights for the World Cup and fined 24,000 Swiss francs ($26,500). According to the Swiss attorney general's office, Valcke exploited his FIFA role between 2013 and 2015 to favour media partners he preferred by providing the media rights for various World Cup and Confederations Cup tournaments.

=== Executive and governance roles in international football ===
Al-Khelaifi was a member of the organizing committee for the FIFA Club World Cup.

He has been a member of the UEFA executive committee since 2019, becoming the first Arab to hold an UEFA position. In April 2021, he was appointed as chairman of European Football Clubs (EFC) by the executive board. In October 2025, he became its representative on the FIFA Council.

== Political career ==
In November 2013, Al-Khelaifi was made minister without portfolio in the Qatari government by the Emir of Qatar, Sheikh Tamim.

== Controversies ==
Al-Khelaifi was charged by Swiss federal prosecutors in connection with a wider bribery investigation linked to World Cup television rights in February 2020. However, Khelaifi stated that he was cleared of all suspicions and the case was dismissed.

On 9 March 2022, after Paris Saint-Germain's 1–3 away loss (2–3 aggregate score) to Real Madrid in the 2021–22 UEFA Champions League round of 16, Al-Khelaifi allegedly assaulted a linesman, broke his flag, and threatened a Madrid employee with murder. Following an investigation, UEFA found PSG guilty of “violating the basic rules of decent conduct” and “unsporting conduct”, but did not assign any punishment to Al-Khelaifi. UEFA did not explain why Al-Khelafi was not cited in the disciplinary statement.

In February 2025, Al-Khelaifi was indicted by a French court on charges of 'complicity in abuse of power', in a case related to a 2018 dispute within Lagardère Group involving the Qatar Investment Authority. Al-Khelaifi denied the accusations, and filed a complaint. According to sources speaking with RMC Sport, in response to these legal proceedings Qatari senior officials threatened to withdraw their investments in France, including from both PSG and BeIN Sports.

In September 2026, prosecutors in Paris said that al-Khelaifi is under investigation on suspicion of an illegal conflict of interest, in connection with his leadership roles in both PSG and BeIn Media Group, and the latter's €100 million offer to broadcast Ligue 1 matches. Al-Khelaifi's lawyer rejected the allegations.

=== Tayeb Benabderrahmane case ===
In February 2023, three investigative judges of the Paris tribunal were appointed to examine accusations of “kidnapping, unlawful detention and acts of torture” made by Franco-Algerian lobbyist Tayeb Benabderrahmane, notably targeting Nasser al-Khelaifi. In July 2023, a search was carried out at Al-Khelaifi's Paris residence as part of the investigation. Nasser al-Khelaifi denied any involvement, denounced the allegations as “lies,” and stated that he was the target of an attempted blackmail, for which he himself filed a complaint in Paris.

In October 2022, lawyer Olivier Pardo, then counsel for Benabderrahmane, claimed that his client possessed recordings relating to the private life of Nasser al-Khelaifi and had considered using them to obtain “several tens of millions”. These statements, disputed by Al-Khelaifi, were included in the judicial case file in Paris, within the framework of which Pardo's law office was searched by the Central Office for the Fight against Organized Crime. Relations between Olivier Pardo and Benabderrahmane had already deteriorated in a dispute over allegedly excessive fees: Pardo had demanded €150,000, including an €84,000 advance, before the Paris Bar ultimately set the amount due at €44,000. Pardo's credibility was subsequently called into question, as he was referred to the criminal court on charges of fraud and corruption in another, unrelated case involving TotalEnergies.

In parallel, in 2022 Benabderrahmane filed an arbitration claim against the State of Qatar before the International Centre for Settlement of Investment Disputes (case ARB/22/23).

On 31 May 2023, the Doha criminal court sentenced Benabderrahmane to death in absentia for “intelligence with a foreign power”; two other Franco-Algerian nationals were also targeted by the same judgment. The existence of this conviction was brought to the attention of the French authorities in July 2023 through an official letter from the Qatari authorities, which became public in late September 2023.

On 20 December 2023, in a provisional measures order, the ICSID tribunal directed the State of Qatar not to take any steps to enforce the conviction pronounced on 31 May 2023, specifying that this prohibition covered in particular any Interpol Red Notice request or extradition request.

On 7 July 2025, the United Nations Working Group on Arbitrary Detention delivered Opinion No. 28/2025, concluding that Benabderrahmane's deprivation of liberty in Qatar in 2020 was arbitrary, identifying serious violations of due process guarantees (categories I, II and III). The opinion also mentioned allegations of ill-treatment and torture, and recommended remedial measures, including compensation and an independent investigation.

== Awards and honors ==
In February 2012, he won a French 'Sport Business' award, receiving the most votes out of 1,500 and finishing ahead of nine people.

His growing influence in the sport was recognised in 2015 when he was voted 'favourite Ligue 1 president' in a poll conducted by France Football, with 35% of the votes cast.

In 2016, the French daily sport newspaper L'Équipe named him the 'most powerful man in French football' in a 30-man list, ahead of such notable individuals as Didier Deschamps and Zinedine Zidane.

In 2020, he was named the most influential person in football by France Football.

In March 2020, Al-Khelaifi was praised by World Health Organization Director-General Tedros Adhanom Ghebreyesus after offering to help in the global fight against the COVID-19 pandemic by using his players and club to send health advice messages to the public.

== Personal life ==
He is close to the Emir, Sheikh Tamim, head of sovereign wealth fund Qatar Investment Authority.

He is married, and has four children who reside in Qatar.
