= Qatar Tennis Federation =

Tennis organization in Qatar

- Sport: Tennis
- Abbreviation: (QTF)
- Affiliation: International Tennis Federation
- Affiliation date: 9 April 1984; 41 years ago
- Regional affiliation: Asian Tennis Federation
- Headquarters: Khalifa International Tennis and Squash Complex
- Location: Doha
- President: Nasser Al-Khelaifi
- Secretary: Tareq Darwish Zainal

Official website
- www.qatartennis.org
- (Qatar)

Qatar Tennis Federation (QTF) (Arabic: الاتحاد القطري للتنس) is the governing body for professional and amateur Tennis in Qatar. The mission of QTF is to provide young Qatari tennis players the best resources and opportunities available to reach their maximum potential and compete in renowned tennis tournaments locally, regionally and internationally. In addition the Qatar Tennis Federation (QTF) is fully committed to elevate the level of tennis in the country and to turn tennis into the preferred sport among the community of Qatar.

Qatar Tennis Federation operates all of the Qatar national representative tennis sides, including the Qatar national men's team, the Qatar national women's tennis team and youth sides as well. QTF is also responsible for organizing and hosting the all types of tennis tournaments in Qatar.

== History ==
The Qatar Tennis Federation was established on 9 April 1984, and Issa Ghanem Al-Kuwari became the first president of the Federation, appointing Yehya El Baz as first technical secretary of the federation, being the first Egyptian to officiate at tier 1 in Wimbledon and the ITF. Under the guidance of Al-Kuwari, he led the introduction of grass roots sports development in the State of Qatar with the introduction in 1987 of tennis programmes into the major sporting clubs of Qatar. During this period, tennis was established as both a sporting interest for the state but also served as a mechanism for promoting the interests of the country on the political and sporting circuits with the first-ever demonstration matches in the region showcasing Vijay Amritraj, Mansour Bahrami, and others.

In 1991, facilities at the Qatar Tennis Federation had increased, including the number of tennis courts and, on 16 December 1992, the modern Khalifa International Tennis and Squash Complex in Doha was inaugurated by Hamad bin Khalifa Al Thani, the emir of Qatar. The first ATP Qatar Open for men took place in January 1993. Due to the major development in the sport for women in the country, the Qatar Tennis Federation took a major steps for the development of women tennis in Qatar and organized the first women tennis championship to be held in the Middle East. Starting in 2001, the Qatar Open attracted notable women players from the WTA Tour including; Martina Hingis, Mary Pierce, Sandrine Testud, Arantxa Sánchez Vicario among many others. From 2008 to 2010 the Sony Ericsson Championships were held in Qatar.

== Tennis in Qatar ==
All the progress and development of tennis in the nation has brought as a result the increase of Qatari players, their participation in tennis tournaments and the opportunity to come in contact with international professional players. But still tennis is not as popular as football, still at professional level there are not so much players from Qatar. QTF inaugurated the Tennis School for the young tennis aspirants of age group 5 to 15 in 2006 to provide the most advance and professional tennis skills.

== Tournaments ==
QTF annually organizes two international tournaments for men and women, which attracts world's top players.

- Qatar Open - ATP Tournament for men.
- Qatar Ladies Open - WTA Tournament for women.

QTF has also organized WTA Tour Championships three times in 2008, 2009 and 2010.

== Board of directors ==
This is a list of current board of directors of Qatar Tennis Federation.

| Name | Position |
|---|---|
| Nasser Ghanim Al Khelaifi | President |
| Tareq Zainal | General Secretary |
| Abdallah Al Subaie | Board Member |
| Yousif Al Obaidly | Board Member |
| Mohammed Al Suabaie | Board Member |
| Khalid Ghanim Al–Khelaifi | Board Member |
| Karim Alami | Board Member |

== See also ==
- Qatar ExxonMobil Open
- Qatar Total Open Open
