= 2008 Fed Cup World Group II =

Part of tennis tournament

The World Group II was the second highest level of Fed Cup competition in 2008. Winning nations advanced to the World Group play-offs, and the losing nations were demoted to the World Group II play-offs.

== Ukraine vs. Belgium ==
Ukraine
3
Lokomotiv Palace of Sports, Kharkiv, Ukraine
2–3 February 2008
Red clay (indoors)

Belgium
2

			1	2	3
1	(Ukraine) (Belgium)	Alona Bondarenko; Kirsten Flipkens	6; 1	6; 2
2	(Ukraine) (Belgium)	Kateryna Bondarenko; Yanina Wickmayer	6^{5} 7^{7}	1; 6
3	(Ukraine) (Belgium)	Alona Bondarenko; Yanina Wickmayer	3; 6	4; 6
4	(Ukraine) (Belgium)	Kateryna Bondarenko; Tamaryn Hendler	4; 6	6; 4	6; 1
5	(Ukraine) (Belgium)	Alona Bondarenko / Kateryna Bondarenko; Caroline Maes / Yanina Wickmayer	6; 2	6; 3

== Japan vs. Croatia ==
Japan
4
Beans Dome, Miki-shi, Japan
2–3 February 2008
Decoturf (indoors)

Croatia
1

			1	2	3
1	(Japan) (Croatia)	Akiko Morigami; Nika Ožegović	2; 6	7; 5	6; 1
2	(Japan) (Croatia)	Aiko Nakamura; Jelena Kostanić Tošić	3; 6	6; 3	3; 6
3	(Japan) (Croatia)	Akiko Morigami; Jelena Kostanić Tošić	6; 1	6; 2
4	(Japan) (Croatia)	Aiko Nakamura; Nika Ožegović	6; 0	4; 6	6; 2
5	(Japan) (Croatia)	Rika Fujiwara / Ayumi Morita; Petra Martić / Ana Vrljić	6; 2	6; 3

== Czech Republic vs. Slovakia ==
Czech Republic
3
Brno Exhibition Center, Brno, Czech Republic
2–3 February 2008
Supreme carpet (indoors)

Slovakia
2

			1	2	3
1	(Czech Republic) (Slovakia)	Petra Cetkovská; Dominika Cibulková	5; 7	3; 6
2	(Czech Republic) (Slovakia)	Nicole Vaidišová; Magdaléna Rybáriková	7; 5	6; 4
3	(Czech Republic) (Slovakia)	Nicole Vaidišová; Dominika Cibulková	3; 6	6; 3	6; 1
4	(Czech Republic) (Slovakia)	Petra Cetkovská; Magdaléna Rybáriková	4; 6	3; 6
5	(Czech Republic) (Slovakia)	Nicole Vaidišová / Květa Peschke; Dominika Cibulková / Janette Husárová	6; 1	2; 6	6; 4

== Argentina vs. Austria ==
Argentina
4
Estadio Parque Roca, Buenos Aires, Argentina
2–3 February 2008
Red clay (outdoors)

Austria
1

			1	2	3
1	(Argentina) (Austria)	Jorgelina Cravero; Yvonne Meusburger	7^{7} 6^{4}	6; 3
2	(Argentina) (Austria)	María Emilia Salerni; Melanie Klaffner	6; 2	3; 6	5; 7
3	(Argentina) (Austria)	María Emilia Salerni; Patricia Mayr	7; 5	3; 6	6; 2
4	(Argentina) (Austria)	Jorgelina Cravero; Melanie Klaffner	6; 4	6; 4
5	(Argentina) (Austria)	María Irigoyen / Betina Jozami; Yvonne Meusburger / Barbara Schwartz	6; 1	4; 6	6; 3

== See also ==
- Fed Cup structure
