= 2008 Fed Cup World Group II play-offs =

Part of tennis tournament

The 2008 World Group II play-offs were four ties which involved the losing nations of the World Group II and four nations from the three Zonal Group I competitions. Nations that won their play-off ties entered the 2009 World Group II, while losing nations joined their respective zonal groups.

== Croatia vs. Serbia ==
Croatia
2
Dom Sportova, Zagreb, Croatia
26–27 April 2008
RuKortHard (indoors)

Serbia
3

			1	2	3
1	(Croatia) (Serbia)	Jelena Kostanić Tošić; Ana Jovanović	4; 6	5; 7
2	(Croatia) (Serbia)	Nika Ožegović; Jelena Janković	1; 6	2; 6
3	(Croatia) (Serbia)	Nika Ožegović; Ana Ivanovic	5; 7	1; 6
4	(Croatia) (Serbia)	Ana Vrljić; Teodora Mirčić	6; 4	7; 5
5	(Croatia) (Serbia)	Jelena Kostanić Tošić / Ana Vrljić; Ana Jovanović / Teodora Mirčić	4; 1			retired

== Slovakia vs. Uzbekistan ==
Slovakia
5
Sibamac Arena, Bratislava, Slovakia
26–27 April 2008
Red clay (indoors)

Uzbekistan
0

			1	2	3
1	(Slovakia) (Uzbekistan)	Magdaléna Rybáriková; Akgul Amanmuradova	7^{7} 6^{4}	6; 2
2	(Slovakia) (Uzbekistan)	Dominika Cibulková; Iroda Tulyaganova	7^{7} 6^{4}	7; 5
3	(Slovakia) (Uzbekistan)	Dominika Cibulková; Akgul Amanmuradova	7^{11} 6^{9}	6; 4
4	(Slovakia) (Uzbekistan)	Kristína Kučová; Vlada Ekshibarova	6; 1	2; 6	6; 4
5	(Slovakia) (Uzbekistan)	Janette Husárová / Magdaléna Rybáriková; Vlada Ekshibarova / Albina Khabibulina	6; 0	6; 2

== Belgium vs. Colombia ==
Belgium
5
Mons Expo, Mons, Belgium
26–27 April 2008
Greenset hard (indoors)

Colombia
0

			1	2	3
1	(Belgium) (Colombia)	Kirsten Flipkens; Catalina Castaño	6; 1	6; 0
2	(Belgium) (Colombia)	Yanina Wickmayer; Mariana Duque Mariño	6; 4	6; 3
3	(Belgium) (Colombia)	Yanina Wickmayer; Yuliana Lizarazo	6; 0	6; 0
4	(Belgium) (Colombia)	Kirsten Flipkens; Mariana Duque Mariño	6; 4	6; 3
5	(Belgium) (Colombia)	Debbrich Feys / Caroline Maes; Yuliana Lizarazo / Alexandra Moreno-Kaste	6; 2	6; 3

== Austria vs. Switzerland ==
Austria
2
Messestadion, Dornbirn, Austria
26–27 April 2008
Opticourt hard (indoors)

Switzerland
3

			1	2	3
1	(Austria) (Switzerland)	Sybille Bammer; Emmanuelle Gagliardi	7; 5	6; 3
2	(Austria) (Switzerland)	Tamira Paszek; Patty Schnyder	7^{7} 6^{5}	2; 6	1; 6
3	(Austria) (Switzerland)	Sybille Bammer; Patty Schnyder	6; 4	6; 0
4	(Austria) (Switzerland)	Tamira Paszek; Stefanie Vögele	6; 4	1; 6	5; 7
5	(Austria) (Switzerland)	Melanie Klaffner / Yvonne Meusburger; Patty Schnyder / Emmanuelle Gagliardi	0; 6	1; 6

== See also ==
- Fed Cup structure
