= Lawn Tennis Association of Thailand =

Tennis organization in Thailand

- Sport: Tennis
- Jurisdiction: National
- Abbreviation: (LTAT)
- Founded: April 15, 1927
- Affiliation: International Tennis Federation
- Regional affiliation: Asian Tennis Federation
- Headquarters: Tambol Bangpood, Muang Thong Thani, Chang-Wattana road
- Location: Pak Kret, Nonthaburi
- President: Suwat Liptapanlop
- Chairman: Admiral Banawit Kengrian

Official website
- www.ltat.org
- (Thailand)

The Lawn Tennis Association of Thailand (LTAT) (Thai: ลอนเทนนิสสมาคมแห่งประเทศไทย) is the national governing body of tennis in Thailand, formed in 1926 it is one of the oldest organised sports governing body in Thailand. The main aims of the organisation is to develop international level tennis players, improve the infrastructure for tennis and to popularise it in Thailand.

== History ==
Tennis was introduced in Thailand by Europeans. First Thai who played this game were students came back from Europe after their study. Royal family of Thailand played the major role in the starting development of tennis in Thailand. In 1926 king Prajadhipok founded the Lawn Tennis Association of Thailand at Saralom Garden. Official regulation of organisation was started from April 15, 1927 after the meeting of 12 association- Amusement association, railways association Lampang association, Silom association, Warrant association, Chiengmai Gyms association, Songkla association, Military association and Phuket association. The decision was made to settle the regulation of Lawn Tennis Association of Thailand as supreme governing body of tennis in Thailand.

== Venue ==
The association's main venue and headquarters since 2007 is also known as the National Tennis Development Centre, and is located within the Muang Thong Thani neighbourhood in Pak Kret district, Nonthaburi province. It comprises eleven hard courts, including one seated stadium.
