= 1988 Federation Cup (tennis) =

International women's tennis competition

Details
- Duration: 4–11 December
- Edition: 26th

Champion
- Winning nation: Czechoslovakia

The 1988 Federation Cup was the 26th edition of the most important competition between national teams in women's tennis. The tournament was held at Flinders Park in Melbourne, Australia, from 4–11 December. Czechoslovakia defeated the Soviet Union in the final (in what was the first time the Soviet Union reached the semifinals since 1979), giving Czechoslovakia their 5th title, and 4th in six years.

== Qualifying round ==
All ties were played at Flinders Park in Melbourne, Australia, on hard courts.

Winning team	Score	Losing team
China	2–1	Malta
Luxembourg	2–1	Chinese Taipei
South Korea	3–0	Ireland
Bulgaria	3–0	Philippines

Winning nations advance to Main Draw, losing nations play in consolation rounds.

=== China vs. Malta ===
China
2
Flinders Park, Melbourne, Australia
December 1988
Hard

Malta
1

			1	2	3
1	(China) (Malta)	Yang Li-Hua; Helen Asciak	2; 6	1; 6
2	(China) (Malta)	Tang Min; Carol Cassar-Torreggiani	7^{7} 6^{4}	6; 2
3	(China) (Malta)	Hua Wei / Tang Min; Carol Cassar-Torreggiani / Alexia Gera	6; 4	6^{5} 7^{7}	6; 2

=== Luxembourg vs. Chinese Taipei ===
Luxembourg
2
Flinders Park, Melbourne, Australia
December 1988
Hard

Chinese Taipei
1

			1	2	3
1	(Luxembourg) (Chinese Taipei)	Ginette Huberty; Lai Su-lin	2; 6	6; 1	2; 6
2	(Luxembourg) (Chinese Taipei)	Karin Kschwendt; Wang Shi-ting	4; 6	6; 4	6; 1
3	(Luxembourg) (Chinese Taipei)	Ginette Huberty / Karin Kschwendt; Lai Su-lin / Wang Shi-ting	6; 1	6; 0

=== South Korea vs. Ireland ===
South Korea
3
Flinders Park, Melbourne, Australia
December 1988
Hard

Ireland
0

			1	2	3
1	(South Korea) (Republic of Ireland)	Kim Il-soon; Jo Griffiths	6; 1	6; 0
2	(South Korea) (Republic of Ireland)	Park Mal-sim; Siobhán Nicholson	6; 3	6; 1
3	(South Korea) (Republic of Ireland)	Lee Jeong-soon / Sohn Mi-ae; Siobhán Nicholson / Lesley O'Halloran	6; 2	5; 7	6; 2

=== Bulgaria vs. Philippines ===
Bulgaria
3
Flinders Park, Melbourne, Australia
December 1988
Hard

Philippines
0

			1	2	3
1	(Bulgaria) (Philippines)	Galia Angelova; Dyan Castillejo	7; 5	3; 6	6; 1
2	(Bulgaria) (Philippines)	Elena Pampoulova; Sarah Rafael	6; 3	6; 2
3	(Bulgaria) (Philippines)	Galia Angelova / Svetlana Krivencheva; Dyan Castillejo / Jennifer Saberon	6^{7} 7^{9}	7^{7} 6^{3}	6; 4

== Main draw ==
Participating Teams
Argentina	Australia	Austria	Belgium	Brazil	Bulgaria	Canada	China
Czechoslovakia	Denmark	Finland	France	Great Britain	Greece	Hungary	Indonesia
Israel	Italy	Japan	Luxembourg	Mexico	Netherlands	New Zealand	Poland
South Korea	Soviet Union	Spain	Sweden	Switzerland	United States	West Germany	Yugoslavia

First Round
West Germany	3
Mexico	0
Japan	0
France	3
Italy	2
Poland	1
Israel	0
Australia	3
Soviet Union	3
Yugoslavia	0
Belgium	1
Austria	2
Netherlands	0
Spain	3
Indonesia	2
Great Britain	1
Czechoslovakia	3
Brazil	0
Q	China	0
New Zealand	3
Denmark	3
Q	Luxembourg	0
Greece	0
Argentina	3
Canada	2
Q	South Korea	1
Finland	2
Hungary	1
Q	Bulgaria	0
Sweden	3
Switzerland	0
United States	3

Second Round
West Germany	3
France	0
Italy	0
Australia	3
Soviet Union	2
Austria	1
Spain	3
Indonesia	0
Czechoslovakia	3
New Zealand	0
Denmark	2
Argentina	1
Canada	3
Finland	0
Sweden	2
United States	1

Quarterfinals
West Germany	2
Australia	1
Soviet Union	2
Spain	1
Czechoslovakia	3
Denmark	0
Canada	3
Sweden	0

Semifinals
West Germany	1
Soviet Union	2
Czechoslovakia	3
Canada	0

Final
Soviet Union	1
Czechoslovakia	2

1st Round losing teams play in consolation rounds

=== First round ===
==== West Germany vs. Mexico ====
West Germany
3
Flinders Park, Melbourne, Australia
December 1988
Hard

Mexico
0

			1	2	3
1	(West Germany) (Mexico)	Sylvia Hanika; Xóchitl Escobedo	6; 3	6; 2
2	(West Germany) (Mexico)	Claudia Kohde-Kilsch; Claudia Hernández	6; 2	6; 0
3	(West Germany) (Mexico)	Isabel Cueto / Eva Pfaff; Lucila Becerra / Claudia Hernández	7^{7} 6^{5}	6; 2

==== Japan vs. France ====
Japan
0
Flinders Park, Melbourne, Australia
December 1988
Hard

France
3

			1	2	3
1	(Japan) (France)	Akiko Kijimuta; Karine Quentrec	4; 6	4; 6
2	(Japan) (France)	Etsuko Inoue; Catherine Tanvier	3; 6	3; 6
3	(Japan) (France)	Etsuko Inoue / Akiko Kijimuta; Catherine Suire / Catherine Tanvier	4; 6	6^{4} 7^{7}

==== Italy vs. Poland ====
Italy
2
Flinders Park, Melbourne, Australia
December 1988
Hard

Poland
1

			1	2	3
1	(Italy) (Poland)	Laura Lapi; Magdalena Feistel	6; 1	7^{7} 6^{2}
2	(Italy) (Poland)	Laura Garrone; Katarzyna Nowak	6; 0	4; 6	3; 6
3	(Italy) (Poland)	Cathy Caverzasio / Laura Garrone; Katarzyna Nowak / Ewa Zerdecka	2; 6	7^{7} 6^{3}	6; 2

==== Israel vs. Australia ====
Israel
0
Flinders Park, Melbourne, Australia
December 1988
Hard

Australia
3

			1	2	3
1	(Israel) (Australia)	Yael Segal; Nicole Provis	6; 4	3; 6	4; 6
2	(Israel) (Australia)	Ilana Berger; Anne Minter	2; 6	2; 6
3	(Israel) (Australia)	Ilana Berger / Hagit Ohayon; Elizabeth Smylie / Wendy Turnbull	2; 6	1; 6

==== Soviet Union vs. Yugoslavia ====
Soviet Union
3
Flinders Park, Melbourne, Australia
December 1988
Hard

Yugoslavia
0

			1	2	3
1	(Soviet Union) (Socialist Federal Republic of Yugoslavia)	Larisa Savchenko; Tanja Černe	6; 2	6; 1
2	(Soviet Union) (Socialist Federal Republic of Yugoslavia)	Natasha Zvereva; Karmen Škulj	6; 1	6; 4
3	(Soviet Union) (Socialist Federal Republic of Yugoslavia)	Larisa Savchenko / Natasha Zvereva; Mima Jaušovec / Karmen Škulj	6; 1	6; 3

==== Belgium vs. Austria ====
Belgium
1
Flinders Park, Melbourne, Australia
December 1988
Hard

Austria
2

			1	2	3
1	(Belgium) (Austria)	Sabine Appelmans; Petra Schwarz	6; 4	4; 2		retired
2	(Belgium) (Austria)	Ann Devries; Judith Wiesner	1; 6	1; 6
3	(Belgium) (Austria)	Sabine Appelmans / Ann Devries; Heidi Sprung / Judith Wiesner	4; 6	6^{3} 7^{7}

==== Netherlands vs. Spain ====
Netherlands
0
Flinders Park, Melbourne, Australia
December 1988
Hard

Spain
3

			1	2	3
1	(Netherlands) (Spain)	Manon Bollegraf; Conchita Martínez	2; 6	4; 6
2	(Netherlands) (Spain)	Brenda Schultz; Arantxa Sánchez Vicario	2; 6	6^{5} 7^{7}
3	(Netherlands) (Spain)	Manon Bollegraf / Caroline Vis; Conchita Martínez / Arantxa Sánchez Vicario	7; 5	4; 6	4; 6

==== Indonesia vs. Great Britain ====
Indonesia
2
Flinders Park, Melbourne, Australia
December 1988
Hard

Great Britain
1

			1	2	3
1	(Indonesia) (United Kingdom)	Waya Walalangi; Clare Wood	2; 6	3; 6
2	(Indonesia) (United Kingdom)	Yayuk Basuki; Sara Gomer	6; 2	7^{8} 6^{6}
3	(Indonesia) (United Kingdom)	Suzanna Anggarkusuma / Yayuk Basuki; Julie Salmon / Clare Wood	7; 5	6; 3

==== Czechoslovakia vs. Brazil ====
Czechoslovakia
3
Flinders Park, Melbourne, Australia
December 1988
Hard

Brazil
0

			1	2	3
1	(Czechoslovakia) (Brazil)	Radka Zrubáková; Patricia Medrado	6; 0	6; 3
2	(Czechoslovakia) (Brazil)	Helena Suková; Niege Dias	6; 1	6; 3
3	(Czechoslovakia) (Brazil)	Jana Novotná / Jana Pospíšilová; Niege Dias / Luciana Tella	6; 3	6; 2

==== China vs. New Zealand ====
China
0
Flinders Park, Melbourne, Australia
December 1988
Hard

New Zealand
3

			1	2	3
1	(China) (New Zealand)	Yang Li-Hua; Julie Richardson	0; 6	2; 6
2	(China) (New Zealand)	Tang Min; Belinda Cordwell	4; 6	1; 6
3	(China) (New Zealand)	Hua Wei / Tang Min; Belinda Cordwell / Julie Richardson	1; 6	6^{3} 7^{7}

==== Denmark vs. Luxembourg ====
Denmark
3
Flinders Park, Melbourne, Australia
December 1988
Hard

Luxembourg
0

			1	2	3
1	(Denmark) (Luxembourg)	Karin Ptaszek; Ginette Huberty	6; 3	7^{7} 6^{3}
2	(Denmark) (Luxembourg)	Tine Scheuer-Larsen; Karin Kschwendt	6; 3	6; 4
3	(Denmark) (Luxembourg)	Henriette Kjær Nielsen / Tine Scheuer-Larsen; Ginette Huberty / Karin Kschwendt	2; 6	6; 4	6; 3

==== Greece vs. Argentina ====
Greece
0
Flinders Park, Melbourne, Australia
December 1988
Hard

Argentina
3

			1	2	3
1	(Greece) (Argentina)	Olga Tsarbopoulou; Mercedes Paz	1; 6	1; 6
2	(Greece) (Argentina)	Angeliki Kanellopoulou; Bettina Fulco	6; 1	5; 7	3; 6
3	(Greece) (Argentina)	Christína Papadáki / Olga Tsarbopoulou; Mercedes Paz / Cristina Tessi	1; 6	2; 6

==== Canada vs. South Korea ====
Canada
2
Flinders Park, Melbourne, Australia
December 1988
Hard

South Korea
1

			1	2	3
1	(Canada) (South Korea)	Jill Hetherington; Kim Il-soon	3; 6	6; 2	6; 3
2	(Canada) (South Korea)	Helen Kelesi; Park Mal-sim	6; 1	6; 2
3	(Canada) (South Korea)	Helen Kelesi / Rene Simpson; Kim Il-soon / Lee Jeong-myung	4; 6	6^{5} 7^{7}

==== Finland vs. Hungary ====
Finland
2
Flinders Park, Melbourne, Australia
December 1988
Hard

Hungary
1

			1	2	3
1	(Finland) (Hungary)	Anne Aallonen; Petra Schmitt	2; 6	7^{7} 6^{2}	6; 1
2	(Finland) (Hungary)	Petra Thorén; Réka Szikszay	6; 3	6; 3
3	(Finland) (Hungary)	Anne Aallonen / Nanne Dahlman; Virág Csurgó / Réka Szikszay	6; 4	4; 6	4; 6

==== Bulgaria vs. Sweden ====
Bulgaria
0
Flinders Park, Melbourne, Australia
December 1988
Hard

Sweden
3

			1	2	3
1	(Bulgaria) (Sweden)	Galia Angelova; Maria Strandlund	4; 6	7; 5	3; 6
2	(Bulgaria) (Sweden)	Elena Pampoulova; Catarina Lindqvist	5; 7	3; 6
3	(Bulgaria) (Sweden)	Galia Angelova / Elena Pampoulova; Jonna Jonerup / Maria Lindström	6; 2	6^{5} 7^{7}	1; 6

==== Switzerland vs. United States ====
Switzerland
0
Flinders Park, Melbourne, Australia
December 1988
Hard

United States
3

			1	2	3
1	(Switzerland) (United States)	Sandrine Jaquet; Lori McNeil	0; 6	1; 6
2	(Switzerland) (United States)	Eva Krapl; Barbara Potter	2; 6	4; 6
3	(Switzerland) (United States)	Sandrine Jaquet / Emanuela Zardo; Patty Fendick / Gigi Fernández	0; 6	0; 6

=== Second round ===
==== West Germany vs. France ====
West Germany
3
Flinders Park, Melbourne, Australia
December 1988
Hard

France
0

			1	2	3
1	(West Germany) (France)	Sylvia Hanika; Karine Quentrec	6; 4	6; 4
2	(West Germany) (France)	Claudia Kohde-Kilsch; Catherine Tanvier	7; 5	6; 4
3	(West Germany) (France)	Isabel Cueto / Eva Pfaff; Maïder Laval / Catherine Suire	6; 4	4; 6	6; 1

==== Italy vs. Australia ====
Italy
0
Flinders Park, Melbourne, Australia
December 1988
Hard

Australia
3

			1	2	3
1	(Italy) (Australia)	Laura Lapi; Nicole Provis	3; 6	6; 1	3; 6
2	(Italy) (Australia)	Laura Garrone; Anne Minter	6^{0} 7^{7}	3; 6
3	(Italy) (Australia)	Cathy Caverzasio / Laura Garrone; Elizabeth Smylie / Wendy Turnbull	4; 6	2; 6

==== Soviet Union vs. Austria ====
Soviet Union
2
Flinders Park, Melbourne, Australia
December 1988
Hard

Austria
1

			1	2	3
1	(Soviet Union) (Austria)	Larisa Savchenko; Heidi Sprung	6; 2	4; 6	4; 6
2	(Soviet Union) (Austria)	Natasha Zvereva; Judith Wiesner	6; 3	6; 3
3	(Soviet Union) (Austria)	Larisa Savchenko / Natasha Zvereva; Heidi Sprung / Judith Wiesner	6; 1	6; 1

==== Spain vs. Indonesia ====
Spain
3
Flinders Park, Melbourne, Australia
December 1988
Hard

Indonesia
0

			1	2	3
1	(Spain) (Indonesia)	Conchita Martínez; Waya Walalangi	6; 0	6; 1
2	(Spain) (Indonesia)	Arantxa Sánchez Vicario; Yayuk Basuki	6; 1	6; 1
3	(Spain) (Indonesia)	Conchita Martínez / Arantxa Sánchez Vicario; Suzanna Anggarkusuma / Yayuk Basuki	6; 0	5; 7	6; 2

==== Czechoslovakia vs. New Zealand ====
Czechoslovakia
3
Flinders Park, Melbourne, Australia
December 1988
Hard

New Zealand
0

			1	2	3
1	(Czechoslovakia) (New Zealand)	Radka Zrubáková; Julie Richardson	6; 1	6; 1
2	(Czechoslovakia) (New Zealand)	Helena Suková; Belinda Cordwell	6; 4	6; 3
3	(Czechoslovakia) (New Zealand)	Jana Novotná / Jana Pospíšilová; Belinda Cordwell / Julie Richardson	7^{7} 6^{1}	7^{7} 6^{4}

==== Denmark vs. Argentina ====
Denmark
2
Flinders Park, Melbourne, Australia
December 1988
Hard

Argentina
1

			1	2	3
1	(Denmark) (Argentina)	Karin Ptaszek; Mercedes Paz	1; 6	2; 6
2	(Denmark) (Argentina)	Tine Scheuer-Larsen; Bettina Fulco	6; 3	6; 2
3	(Denmark) (Argentina)	Henriette Kjær Nielsen / Tine Scheuer-Larsen; Bettina Fulco / Mercedes Paz	4; 6	7^{8} 6^{6}	6; 4

==== Canada vs. Finland ====
Canada
3
Flinders Park, Melbourne, Australia
December 1988
Hard

Finland
0

			1	2	3
1	(Canada) (Finland)	Jill Hetherington; Anne Aallonen	6; 1	7^{8} 6^{6}
2	(Canada) (Finland)	Helen Kelesi; Petra Thorén	6; 4	6; 1
3	(Canada) (Finland)	Jill Hetherington / Helen Kelesi; Anne Aallonen / Nanne Dahlman	6; 1	6; 1

==== Sweden vs. United States ====
Sweden
2
Flinders Park, Melbourne, Australia
December 1988
Hard

United States
1

			1	2	3
1	(Sweden) (United States)	Maria Strandlund; Patty Fendick	6; 2	7^{7} 6^{3}
2	(Sweden) (United States)	Catarina Lindqvist; Lori McNeil	6; 4	7; 5
3	(Sweden) (United States)	Catarina Lindqvist / Maria Lindström; Gigi Fernández / Lori McNeil	5; 7	1; 6

=== Quarterfinals ===
==== West Germany vs. Australia ====
West Germany
2
Flinders Park, Melbourne, Australia
December 1988
Hard

Australia
1

			1	2	3
1	(West Germany) (Australia)	Sylvia Hanika; Nicole Provis	6; 1	6; 2
2	(West Germany) (Australia)	Claudia Kohde-Kilsch; Anne Minter	1; 6	6; 4	6; 3
3	(West Germany) (Australia)	Sylvia Hanika / Claudia Kohde-Kilsch; Elizabeth Smylie / Wendy Turnbull	6; 2	0; 6	2; 6

==== Soviet Union vs. Spain ====
Soviet Union
2
Flinders Park, Melbourne, Australia
December 1988
Hard

Spain
1

			1	2	3
1	(Soviet Union) (Spain)	Larisa Savchenko; Conchita Martínez	7^{7} 6^{4}	6; 2
2	(Soviet Union) (Spain)	Natasha Zvereva; Arantxa Sánchez Vicario	6^{3} 7^{7}	1; 6
3	(Soviet Union) (Spain)	Larisa Savchenko / Natasha Zvereva; Conchita Martínez / Arantxa Sánchez Vicario	4; 6	6; 4	6; 4

==== Czechoslovakia vs. Denmark ====
Czechoslovakia
3
Flinders Park, Melbourne, Australia
December 1988
Hard

Denmark
0

			1	2	3
1	(Czechoslovakia) (Denmark)	Radka Zrubáková; Karin Ptaszek	6; 1	6; 2
2	(Czechoslovakia) (Denmark)	Helena Suková; Tine Scheuer-Larsen	6; 4	6; 4
3	(Czechoslovakia) (Denmark)	Jana Novotná / Jana Pospíšilová; Henriette Kjær Nielsen / Tine Scheuer-Larsen	6; 3	6; 2

==== Canada vs. Sweden ====
Canada
3
Flinders Park, Melbourne, Australia
December 1988
Hard

Sweden
0

			1	2	3
1	(Canada) (Sweden)	Jill Hetherington; Maria Strandlund	6; 3	7^{9} 6^{7}
2	(Canada) (Sweden)	Helen Kelesi; Catarina Lindqvist	6; 4	6; 4
3	(Canada) (Sweden)	Jill Hetherington / Helen Kelesi; Catarina Lindqvist / Maria Lindström	6; 3	6; 0

=== Semifinals ===
==== West Germany vs. Soviet Union ====
West Germany
1
Flinders Park, Melbourne, Australia
December 1988
Hard

Soviet Union
2

			1	2	3
1	(West Germany) (Soviet Union)	Sylvia Hanika; Larisa Savchenko	7; 5	6^{5} 7^{7}	3; 6
2	(West Germany) (Soviet Union)	Claudia Kohde-Kilsch; Natasha Zvereva	7; 5	6; 1
3	(West Germany) (Soviet Union)	Sylvia Hanika / Claudia Kohde-Kilsch; Larisa Savchenko / Natasha Zvereva	6; 1	1; 6	5; 7

==== Czechoslovakia vs. Canada ====
Czechoslovakia
3
Flinders Park, Melbourne, Australia
December 1988
Hard

Canada
0

			1	2	3
1	(Czechoslovakia) (Canada)	Radka Zrubáková; Jill Hetherington	7^{7} 6^{3}	3; 6	6; 3
2	(Czechoslovakia) (Canada)	Helena Suková; Helen Kelesi	6; 0	6; 1
3	(Czechoslovakia) (Canada)	Jana Novotná / Jana Pospíšilová; Helen Kelesi / Rene Simpson	7^{7} 6^{3}	6; 3

=== Final ===
==== Soviet Union vs. Czechoslovakia ====
Soviet Union
1
Flinders Park, Melbourne, Australia
11 December 1988
Hard

Czechoslovakia
2

			1	2	3
1	(Soviet Union) (Czechoslovakia)	Larisa Savchenko; Radka Zrubáková	1; 6	6^{2} 7^{7}
2	(Soviet Union) (Czechoslovakia)	Natasha Zvereva; Helena Suková	3; 6	4; 6
3	(Soviet Union) (Czechoslovakia)	Larisa Savchenko / Natasha Zvereva; Jana Pospíšilová / Jana Novotná	7^{7} 6^{5}	7; 5

1988 Federation Cup Champions
(Czechoslovakia)
Czechoslovakia
Fifth title

== Consolation rounds ==
=== Draw ===
Consolation first round
Philippines	1
Ireland	2
Bulgaria	2
Malta	1
Luxembourg	1
South Korea	2
China	0
Chinese Taipei	3

Consolation second round
Brazil	3
Hungary	0
Poland	0
Israel	3
Yugoslavia	2
Ireland	1
Netherlands	2
Bulgaria	0
South Korea	2
Japan	1
Greece	0
Belgium	3
Chinese Taipei	2
Mexico	1
Switzerland	1
Great Britain	2

Consolation quarterfinals
Brazil	3
Israel	0
Yugoslavia	0
Netherlands	3
South Korea	1
Belgium	2
Chinese Taipei	0
Great Britain	3

Consolation semifinals
Brazil	0
Netherlands	3
Belgium	1
Great Britain	2

Consolation final
Netherlands	2
Great Britain	1

=== First round ===
==== Philippines vs. Ireland ====
Philippines
1
Flinders Park, Melbourne, Australia
December 1988
Hard

Ireland
2

			1	2	3
1	(Philippines) (Republic of Ireland)	Dyan Castillejo; Jo Griffiths	2; 6	6; 3	7; 5
2	(Philippines) (Republic of Ireland)	Sarah Rafael; Siobhán Nicholson	2; 6	2; 6
3	(Philippines) (Republic of Ireland)	Dyan Castillejo / Jennifer Saberon; Siobhán Nicholson / Lesley O'Halloran	2; 6	4; 6

==== Bulgaria vs. Malta ====
Bulgaria
2
Flinders Park, Melbourne, Australia
December 1988
Hard

Malta
1

			1	2	3
1	(Bulgaria) (Malta)	Galia Angelova; Alexia Gera	6; 2	6; 0
2	(Bulgaria) (Malta)	Elena Pampoulova; Carol Cassar-Torreggiani	7^{7} 6^{5}	6; 3
3	(Bulgaria) (Malta)	Galia Angelova / Svetlana Krivencheva; Helen Asciak / Carol Cassar-Torreggiani	4; 6	7; 5	1; 6

==== Luxembourg vs. South Korea ====
Luxembourg
1
Flinders Park, Melbourne, Australia
December 1988
Hard

South Korea
2

			1	2	3
1	(Luxembourg) (South Korea)	Ginette Huberty; Lee Jeong-soon	0; 6	3; 6
2	(Luxembourg) (South Korea)	Karin Kschwendt; Kim Il-soon	7; 5	6; 3
3	(Luxembourg) (South Korea)	Ginette Huberty / Karin Kschwendt; Kim Il-soon / Lee Jeong-soon	1; 6	2; 6

==== China vs. Chinese Taipei ====
China
0
Flinders Park, Melbourne, Australia
December 1988
Hard

Chinese Taipei
3

			1	2	3
1	(China) (Chinese Taipei)	Zhu Yu-Yu; Lai Su-lin	6; 2	5; 7	2; 6
2	(China) (Chinese Taipei)	Tang Min; Wang Shi-ting	6; 3	3; 6	3; 6
3	(China) (Chinese Taipei)	Hua Wei / Yang Li-Hua; Lai Su-lin / Lin Ya-hui	6^{3} 7^{7}	2; 6

=== Second round ===
==== Brazil vs. Hungary ====
Brazil
3
Flinders Park, Melbourne, Australia
December 1988
Hard

Hungary
0

			1	2	3
1	(Brazil) (Hungary)	Patricia Medrado; Virág Csurgó	6; 3	6; 4
2	(Brazil) (Hungary)	Niege Dias; Réka Szikszay	6; 2	6; 0
3	(Brazil) (Hungary)	Niege Dias / Luciana Tella; Virág Csurgó / Réka Szikszay	6; 2	7^{9} 6^{7}

==== Poland vs. Israel ====
Poland
0
Flinders Park, Melbourne, Australia
December 1988
Hard

Israel
3

			1	2	3
1	(Poland) (Israel)	Magdalena Feistel; Yael Segal	2; 6	2; 6
2	(Poland) (Israel)	Ewa Zerdecka; Ilana Berger	5; 7	3; 6
3	(Poland) (Israel)	Magdalena Feistel / Ewa Zerdecka; Ilana Berger / Hagit Ohayon	2; 6	4; 6

==== Yugoslavia vs. Ireland ====
Yugoslavia
2
Flinders Park, Melbourne, Australia
December 1988
Hard

Ireland
1

			1	2	3
1	(Socialist Federal Republic of Yugoslavia) (Republic of Ireland)	Tanja Černe; Jo Griffiths	6; 4	5; 7	1; 6
2	(Socialist Federal Republic of Yugoslavia) (Republic of Ireland)	Karmen Škulj; Lesley O'Halloran	6; 3	6; 2
3	(Socialist Federal Republic of Yugoslavia) (Republic of Ireland)	Mima Jaušovec / Karmen Škulj; Jo Griffiths / Lesley O'Halloran	6; 4	6; 1

==== Netherlands vs. Bulgaria ====
Netherlands
2
Flinders Park, Melbourne, Australia
December 1988
Hard

Bulgaria
0

			1	2	3
1	(Netherlands) (Bulgaria)	Manon Bollegraf; Galia Angelova	6; 3	6; 3
2	(Netherlands) (Bulgaria)	Brenda Schultz; Elena Pampoulova	4; 6	7^{7} 6^{5}	7; 5
3	(Netherlands) (Bulgaria)	Carin Bakkum / Brenda Schultz; Galia Angelova / Svetlana Krivencheva				not played

==== South Korea vs. Japan ====
South Korea
2
Flinders Park, Melbourne, Australia
December 1988
Hard

Japan
1

			1	2	3
1	(South Korea) (Japan)	Lee Jeong-soon; Naoko Sawamatsu	5; 7	4; 6
2	(South Korea) (Japan)	Park Mal-sim; Etsuko Inoue	6; 4	2; 6	6; 4
3	(South Korea) (Japan)	Kim Il-soon / Lee Jeong-soon; Akiko Kijimuta / Kumiko Okamoto	4; 6	6; 1	8; 6

==== Greece vs. Belgium ====
Greece
1
Flinders Park, Melbourne, Australia
December 1988
Hard

Belgium
2

			1	2	3
1	(Greece) (Belgium)	Olga Tsarbopoulou; Sabine Appelmans	2; 6	2; 6
2	(Greece) (Belgium)	Angeliki Kanellopoulou; Ann Devries	6; 3	3; 6	2; 6
3	(Greece) (Belgium)	Christína Papadáki / Olga Tsarbopoulou; Ann Devries / Caroline van Renterghem	2; 6	2; 6

==== Chinese Taipei vs. Mexico ====
Chinese Taipei
0
Flinders Park, Melbourne, Australia
December 1988
Hard

Mexico
3

			1	2	3
1	(Chinese Taipei) (Mexico)	Lai Su-lin; Xóchitl Escobedo	3; 6	4; 6
2	(Chinese Taipei) (Mexico)	Wang Shi-ting; Claudia Hernández	5; 7	6; 3	6; 1
3	(Chinese Taipei) (Mexico)	Lai Su-lin / Wang Shi-ting; Lucila Becerra / Xóchitl Escobedo	6; 2	6; 4

==== Switzerland vs. Great Britain ====
Switzerland
1
Flinders Park, Melbourne, Australia
December 1988
Hard

Great Britain
2

			1	2	3
1	(Switzerland) (United Kingdom)	Emanuela Zardo; Clare Wood	2; 6	6; 4	6; 1
2	(Switzerland) (United Kingdom)	Eva Krapl; Sara Gomer	6; 4	5; 7	2; 6
3	(Switzerland) (United Kingdom)	Sandrine Jaquet / Eva Krapl; Sara Gomer / Julie Salmon	3; 6	0; 6

=== Quarterfinals ===
==== Brazil vs. Israel ====
Brazil
3
Flinders Park, Melbourne, Australia
December 1988
Hard

Israel
0

			1	2	3
1	(Brazil) (Israel)	Patricia Medrado; Yael Segal	7^{7} 6^{4}	1; 0		retired
2	(Brazil) (Israel)	Niege Dias; Ilana Berger	6; 2	7; 5
3	(Brazil) (Israel)	Niege Dias / Luciana Tella; Ilana Berger / Hagit Ohayon	6; 4	7; 5

==== Yugoslavia vs. Netherlands ====
Yugoslavia
0
Flinders Park, Melbourne, Australia
December 1988
Hard

Netherlands
3

			1	2	3
1	(Socialist Federal Republic of Yugoslavia) (Netherlands)	Tanja Černe; Manon Bollegraf	4; 6	4; 6
2	(Socialist Federal Republic of Yugoslavia) (Netherlands)	Karmen Škulj; Brenda Schultz	2; 6	2; 6
3	(Socialist Federal Republic of Yugoslavia) (Netherlands)	Tanja Černe / Karmen Škulj; Carin Bakkum / Brenda Schultz	0; 6	7; 5	2; 6

==== South Korea vs. Belgium ====
South Korea
1
Flinders Park, Melbourne, Australia
December 1988
Hard

Belgium
2

			1	2	3
1	(South Korea) (Belgium)	Kim Il-soon; Sabine Appelmans	2; 6	1; 6
2	(South Korea) (Belgium)	Park Mal-sim; Ann Devries	6; 3	6^{10} 7^{12}	1; 6
3	(South Korea) (Belgium)	Lee Jeong-soon / Sohn Mi-ae; Sabine Appelmans / Caroline van Renterghem	7; 5	3; 6	6; 4

==== Chinese Taipei vs. Great Britain ====
Chinese Taipei
0
Flinders Park, Melbourne, Australia
December 1988
Hard

Great Britain
3

			1	2	3
1	(Chinese Taipei) (United Kingdom)	Lai Su-lin; Clare Wood	6; 4	4; 6	1; 6
2	(Chinese Taipei) (United Kingdom)	Wang Shi-ting; Sara Gomer	4; 6	2; 6
3	(Chinese Taipei) (United Kingdom)	Lai Su-lin / Wang Shi-ting; Sara Gomer / Julie Salmon	1; 6	1; 6

=== Semifinals ===
==== Brazil vs. Netherlands ====
Brazil
0
Flinders Park, Melbourne, Australia
December 1988
Hard

Netherlands
3

			1	2	3
1	(Brazil) (Netherlands)	Patricia Medrado; Manon Bollegraf	6^{1} 7^{7}	2; 6
2	(Brazil) (Netherlands)	Niege Dias; Brenda Schultz	2; 6	1; 6
3	(Brazil) (Netherlands)	Niege Dias / Luciana Tella; Manon Bollegraf / Caroline Vis	3; 6	4; 6

==== Belgium vs. Great Britain ====
Belgium
1
Flinders Park, Melbourne, Australia
December 1988
Hard

Great Britain
2

			1	2	3
1	(Belgium) (United Kingdom)	Sabine Appelmans; Clare Wood	7; 5	3; 6	6; 2
2	(Belgium) (United Kingdom)	Ann Devries; Sara Gomer	7^{7} 6^{4}	2; 6	4; 6
3	(Belgium) (United Kingdom)	Ann Devries / Caroline van Renterghem; Sara Gomer / Julie Salmon	1; 6	2; 6

=== Final ===
==== Netherlands vs. Great Britain ====
Netherlands
2
Flinders Park, Melbourne, Australia
December 1988
Hard

Great Britain
1

			1	2	3
1	(Netherlands) (United Kingdom)	Manon Bollegraf; Clare Wood	2; 6	1; 6
2	(Netherlands) (United Kingdom)	Brenda Schultz; Sara Gomer	3; 6	5; 4		retired
3	(Netherlands) (United Kingdom)	Manon Bollegraf / Caroline Vis; Julie Salmon / Clare Wood	6; 4	6; 1
