= 1992 Federation Cup Asia/Oceania Zone – Knockout Stage =

The Knockout Stage of the 1992 Federation Cup Asia/Oceania Zone was the final stage of the Zonal Competition involving teams from Asia and Oceania. Those that qualified for this stage placed first and second in their respective pools, with the exception of the third-placing India, who qualified due to the withdrawing of Philippines.

Placing	Pool A	Pool B
1	South Korea	Sri Lanka
2	Philippines	Chinese Taipei
3	India	Thailand
4	Malaysia	Hong Kong

The four teams were then randomly drawn into a two-stage knockout tournament, with the winner qualifying for the World Group.

== Draw ==
Semifinals; 7 May
Chinese Taipei	3
Alt	India	0
Sri Lanka	0
South Korea	3

Final; 8 May
Chinese Taipei	0
South Korea	2

=== Semifinals ===
==== Chinese Taipei vs. India ====
Chinese Taipei
3
Olympic T.C., Athens, Greece
7 May 1992
Clay (outdoors)

India
0

			1	2	3
1	(Chinese Taipei) (India)	Lin Ya-hui; Aradhana Reddy	5; 7	7^{7} 6^{3}	6; 1
2	(Chinese Taipei) (India)	Wang Shi-ting; Janaki Krishnamoorthy	6; 1	6; 3
3	(Chinese Taipei) (India)	Ho Chiu-mei / Wang Shi-ting; Janaki Krishnamoorthy / Nirupama Vaidyanathan	6; 1	6; 1

==== Sri Lanka vs. South Korea ====
Sri Lanka
0
National Tennis Centre, Colombo, Sri Lanka
7 May 1992
Clay (outdoors)

South Korea
3

			1	2	3
1	(Sri Lanka) (South Korea)	Vajira Premaratne; Kim Il-soon	1; 6	0; 6
2	(Sri Lanka) (South Korea)	Lihini Weerasuriya; Park Sung-hee	6^{4} 7^{7}	7; 5	5; 7
3	(Sri Lanka) (South Korea)	Vajira Premaratne / Saranga Sangakkara; Kim Il-soon / Lee Jeong-myung	1; 6	1; 6

=== Final ===
==== Chinese Taipei vs. South Korea ====
Chinese Taipei
0
National Tennis Centre, Colombo, Sri Lanka
8 May 1992
Clay (outdoors)

South Korea
2

			1	2	3
1	(Chinese Taipei) (South Korea)	Lin Ya-hui; Kim Il-soon	2; 6	1; 6
2	(Chinese Taipei) (South Korea)	Wang Shi-ting; Park Sung-hee	6; 3	3; 6	3; 6
3	(Chinese Taipei) (South Korea)					not played

- South Korea advanced to the World Group. They defeated Italy in the first round, 2–1, but were defeated in the second round by Czechoslovakia, 3–0.

== See also ==
- Fed Cup structure
