= 1992 Federation Cup Asia/Oceania Zone =

The Asia/Oceania Zone was one of three zones of regional Federation Cup qualifying competition in 1992. All ties were played at the National Tennis Centre in Colombo, Sri Lanka on clay courts.

The eight teams were divided into two pools of four to compete in round-robin matches. After each of the ties had been played, the four teams that finished first and second in each of the respective pools would then move on to the two-round knockout stage of the competition. The team that won the knockout stage would go on to advance to the World Group.

== Pool Stage ==
Date: 4–6 May

	Pool A	KOR	PHI	IND	MAS
1	South Korea (3–0)		3–0	3–0	3–0
2	Philippines (2–1)	0–3		3–0	2–0
3	India (1–2)	0–3	0–3		3–0
4	Malaysia (0–3)	0–3	0–2	0–3	

	Pool B	SRI	TPE	THA	HKG
1	Sri Lanka (3–0)		3–0	2–1	3–0
2	Chinese Taipei (2–1)	0–3		3–0	2–1
3	Thailand (1–2)	1–2	0–3		2–1
4	Hong Kong (0–3)	0–3	1–2	1–2	

== Knockout stage ==
Semifinals; 7 May
Chinese Taipei	3
Alt	India	0
Sri Lanka	0
South Korea	3

Final; 8 May
Chinese Taipei	0
South Korea	2

- South Korea advanced to World Group.

== See also ==
- Fed Cup structure
