= 1992 Federation Cup World Group =

Part of tennis tournament

- Date: 13-19 July
- Edition: 2nd

Champions
- Germany
- Fed Cup

The World Group was the highest level of Federation Cup women's team tennis competition in 1992. Thirty-two nations competed in a five-round knockout competition from 13 to 19 July. Spain was the defending champion, but Germany defeated them in the final to claim their second title and first since the reunification.

== Participating teams ==
Participating teams
Argentina	Australia	Austria	Belgium	Bulgaria	Canada	Chile	China
CIS	Czechoslovakia	Denmark	Finland	France	Germany	Great Britain	Hungary
Indonesia	Israel	Italy	Japan	Mexico	Netherlands	New Zealand	Paraguay
Poland	Romania	South Africa	South Korea	Spain	Sweden	Switzerland	United States

== Draw ==
First Round; 13–14 July
Spain	2
Belgium	1
Canada	2
Q	South Africa	1
Argentina	3
Q	Mexico	0
Japan	2
Indonesia	1
Austria	2
Romania	1
Bulgaria	1
Australia	2
Q	South Korea	2
Italy	1
Hungary	0
Czechoslovakia	3
Germany	3
New Zealand	0
Paraguay	1
Netherlands	2
Poland	3
Israel	0
Sweden	2
Switzerland	1
CIS	2
Finland	1
France	2
China	1
Denmark	2
Q	Chile	1
Great Britain	0
United States	3

Second Round; 15 July
Spain	2
Canada	1
Argentina	2
Japan	1
Austria	1
Australia	2
Q	South Korea	0
Czechoslovakia	3
Germany	2
Netherlands	1
Poland	2
Sweden	1
CIS	0
France	3
Denmark	0
United States	3

Quarterfinals; 16–17 July
Spain	2
Argentina	1
Australia	2
Czechoslovakia	1
Germany	3
Poland	0
France	1
United States	2

Semifinals; 18 July
Spain	3
Australia	0
Germany	2
United States	1

Final; 19 July
Spain	1
Germany	2

== First round ==
=== Spain vs. Belgium ===
Spain
2
Waldstadion T.C., Frankfurt, Germany
14 July 1992
Clay (outdoors)

Belgium
1

			1	2	3
1	(Spain) (Belgium)	Conchita Martínez; Dominique Monami	6; 1	6; 4
2	(Spain) (Belgium)	Arantxa Sánchez Vicario; Sabine Appelmans	6; 1	6; 2
3	(Spain) (Belgium)	Noelia Pérez Peñate / Arantxa Sánchez Vicario; Dominique Monami / Sandra Wasserman	5; 7	4; 6

=== Canada vs. South Africa ===
Canada
2
Waldstadion T.C., Frankfurt, Germany
14 July 1992
Clay (outdoors)

South Africa
1

			1	2	3
1	(Canada) (South Africa)	Rene Simpson; Mariaan de Swardt	2; 6	6; 2	6; 2
2	(Canada) (South Africa)	Patricia Hy; Amanda Coetzer	2; 6	6; 2	6; 2
3	(Canada) (South Africa)	Jill Hetherington / Helen Kelesi; Mariaan de Swardt / Elna Reinach	4; 6	3; 6

=== Argentina vs. Mexico ===
Argentina
3
Waldstadion T.C., Frankfurt, Germany
14 July 1992
Clay (outdoors)

Mexico
0

			1	2	3
1	(Argentina) (Mexico)	Florencia Labat; Lupita Novelo	6; 2	6; 1
2	(Argentina) (Mexico)	Mercedes Paz; Angélica Gavaldón	6; 3	5; 7	6; 2
3	(Argentina) (Mexico)	Mercedes Paz / Patricia Tarabini; Angélica Gavaldón / Lupita Novelo	4; 6	6; 4	6; 1

=== Japan vs. Indonesia ===
Japan
2
Waldstadion T.C., Frankfurt, Germany
14 July 1992
Clay (outdoors)

Indonesia
1

			1	2	3
1	(Japan) (Indonesia)	Mana Endo; Romana Tedjakusuma	6; 2	7^{8} 6^{6}
2	(Japan) (Indonesia)	Kimiko Date; Yayuk Basuki	7^{7} 6^{2}	5; 7	6; 3
3	(Japan) (Indonesia)	Mana Endo / Maya Kidowaki; Yayuk Basuki / Suzanna Anggarkusuma	1; 6	1; 6

=== Austria vs. Romania ===
Austria
2
Waldstadion T.C., Frankfurt, Germany
14 July 1992
Clay (outdoors)

Romania
1

			1	2	3
1	(Austria) (Romania)	Petra Schwarz; Ruxandra Dragomir	4; 6	1; 6
2	(Austria) (Romania)	Judith Wiesner; Irina Spîrlea	6; 0	6; 3
3	(Austria) (Romania)	Petra Schwarz / Judith Wiesner; Ruxandra Dragomir / Irina Spîrlea	7; 5	6; 3

=== Bulgaria vs. Australia ===
Bulgaria
1
Waldstadion T.C., Frankfurt, Germany
14 July 1992
Clay (outdoors)

Australia
2

			1	2	3
1	(Bulgaria) (Australia)	Magdalena Maleeva; Rachel McQuillan	7^{7} 6^{4}	6; 2
2	(Bulgaria) (Australia)	Katerina Maleeva; Nicole Provis	6; 3	4; 6	0; 6
3	(Bulgaria) (Australia)	Katerina Maleeva / Magdalena Maleeva; Nicole Provis / Rennae Stubbs	2; 6	1; 6

=== South Korea vs. Italy ===
South Korea
2
Waldstadion T.C., Frankfurt, Germany
14 July 1992
Clay (outdoors)

Italy
1

			1	2	3
1	(South Korea) (Italy)	Kim Il-soon; Linda Ferrando	4; 6	6; 3	6; 4
2	(South Korea) (Italy)	Park Sung-hee; Sandra Cecchini	4; 6	0; 6
3	(South Korea) (Italy)	Kim Il-soon / Lee Jeong-myung; Sandra Cecchini / Linda Ferrando	2; 6	7^{9} 6^{7}	6; 3

=== Hungary vs. Czechoslovakia ===
Hungary
0
Waldstadion T.C., Frankfurt, Germany
14 July 1992
Clay (outdoors)

Czechoslovakia
3

			1	2	3
1	(Hungary) (Czechoslovakia)	Anna Földényi; Radka Zrubáková	7; 5	2; 6	1; 6
2	(Hungary) (Czechoslovakia)	Andrea Temesvári; Jana Novotná	2; 6	1; 6
3	(Hungary) (Czechoslovakia)	Virág Csurgó / Andrea Temesvári; Jana Novotná / Andrea Strnadová	6; 1	5; 7	5; 7

=== Germany vs. New Zealand ===
Germany
3
Waldstadion T.C., Frankfurt, Germany
13 July 1992
Clay (outdoors)

New Zealand
0

			1	2	3
1	(Germany) (New Zealand)	Anke Huber; Hana Guy	6; 1	6; 0
2	(Germany) (New Zealand)	Steffi Graf; Claudine Toleafoa	6; 2	6; 1
3	(Germany) (New Zealand)	Sabine Hack / Barbara Rittner; Julie Richardson / Amanda Trail	5; 7	6; 3	6; 2

=== Paraguay vs. Netherlands ===
Paraguay
1
Waldstadion T.C., Frankfurt, Germany
13 July 1992
Clay (outdoors)

Netherlands
2

			1	2	3
1	(Paraguay) (Netherlands)	Larissa Schaerer; Nicole Krijger-Jagerman	1; 6	6; 4	6; 2
2	(Paraguay) (Netherlands)	Rossana de los Ríos; Manon Bollegraf	2; 6	2; 6
3	(Paraguay) (Netherlands)	Rossana de los Ríos / Larissa Schaerer; Manon Bollegraf / Nicole Krijger-Jagerman	1; 6	5; 7

=== Poland vs. Israel ===
Poland
3
Waldstadion T.C., Frankfurt, Germany
13 July 1992
Clay (outdoors)

Israel
0

			1	2	3
1	(Poland) (Israel)	Magdalena Feistel; Yael Segal	4; 6	6; 0	6; 2
2	(Poland) (Israel)	Katarzyna Nowak; Anna Smashnova	6; 2	6^{7} 7^{9}	6; 1
3	(Poland) (Israel)	Magdalena Feistel / Katarzyna Teodorowicz-Lisowska; Anna Smashnova / Limor Zaltz	6; 3	6; 2

=== Sweden vs. Switzerland ===
Sweden
2
Waldstadion T.C., Frankfurt, Germany
13 July 1992
Clay (outdoors)

Switzerland
1

			1	2	3
1	(Sweden) (Switzerland)	Cecilia Dahlman; Emanuela Zardo	6; 2	6; 3
2	(Sweden) (Switzerland)	Catarina Lindqvist; Manuela Maleeva-Fragniere	0; 6	2; 6
3	(Sweden) (Switzerland)	Maria Lindström / Maria Strandlund; Manuela Maleeva-Fragniere / Michèle Strebel	6; 4	5; 7	6; 4

=== CIS vs. Finland ===
CIS
2
Waldstadion T.C., Frankfurt, Germany
13 July 1992
Clay (outdoors)

Finland
1

			1	2	3
1	(Commonwealth of Independent States) (Finland)	Elena Makarova; Nanne Dahlman	7^{7} 6^{2}	6; 4
2	(Commonwealth of Independent States) (Finland)	Eugenia Maniokova; Petra Thorén	7; 5	4; 6	5; 7
3	(Commonwealth of Independent States) (Finland)	Elena Makarova / Eugenia Maniokova; Nanne Dahlman / Petra Thorén	6; 3	6; 2

=== France vs. China ===
France
2
Waldstadion T.C., Frankfurt, Germany
13 July 1992
Clay (outdoors)

China
1

			1	2	3
1	(France) (China)	Mary Pierce; Chen Li-Ling	6; 2	6; 2
2	(France) (China)	Nathalie Tauziat; Li Fang	1; 6	7^{7} 6^{5}	3; 6
3	(France) (China)	Isabelle Demongeot / Nathalie Tauziat; Li Fang / Tang Min	6; 3	7^{7} 6^{4}

=== Denmark vs. Chile ===
Denmark
2
Waldstadion T.C., Frankfurt, Germany
13 July 1992
Clay (outdoors)

Chile
1

			1	2	3
1	(Denmark) (Chile)	Karin Ptaszek; Paulina Sepúlveda	6; 1	6; 0
2	(Denmark) (Chile)	Sofie Albinus; Paula Cabezas	3; 6	6; 0	0; 6
3	(Denmark) (Chile)	Henriette Kjær Nielsen / Karin Ptaszek; Paula Cabezas / Macarena Miranda	6; 3	6; 2

=== Great Britain vs. United States ===
Great Britain
0
Waldstadion T.C., Frankfurt, Germany
13 July 1992
Clay (outdoors)

United States
3

			1	2	3
1	(United Kingdom) (United States)	Monique Javer; Gigi Fernández	4; 6	1; 6
2	(United Kingdom) (United States)	Jo Durie; Lori McNeil	5; 7	3; 6
3	(United Kingdom) (United States)	Jo Durie / Clare Wood; Debbie Graham / Pam Shriver	4; 6	6^{6} 7^{8}

== Second round ==
=== Spain vs. Canada ===
Spain
2
Waldstadion T.C., Frankfurt, Germany
15 July 1992
Clay (outdoors)

Canada
1

			1	2	3
1	(Spain) (Canada)	Conchita Martínez; Helen Kelesi	6^{4} 7^{7}	2; 6
2	(Spain) (Canada)	Arantxa Sánchez Vicario; Patricia Hy	6; 4	6; 2
3	(Spain) (Canada)	Conchita Martínez / Arantxa Sánchez Vicario; Jill Hetherington / Patricia Hy	6; 4	6; 0

=== Argentina vs. Japan ===
Argentina
2
Waldstadion T.C., Frankfurt, Germany
15 July 1992
Clay (outdoors)

Japan
1

			1	2	3
1	(Argentina) (Japan)	Florencia Labat; Mana Endo	6; 1	6; 1
2	(Argentina) (Japan)	Mercedes Paz; Kimiko Date	6; 4	1; 6	3; 6
3	(Argentina) (Japan)	Florencia Labat / Patricia Tarabini; Kimiko Date / Maya Kidowaki	7; 5	6; 3

=== Austria vs. Australia ===
Austria
1
Waldstadion T.C., Frankfurt, Germany
15 July 1992
Clay (outdoors)

Australia
2

			1	2	3
1	(Austria) (Australia)	Petra Schwarz; Rachel McQuillan	6; 4	2; 6	0; 6
2	(Austria) (Australia)	Judith Wiesner; Nicole Provis	5; 7	6; 3	6; 4
3	(Austria) (Australia)	Petra Schwarz / Judith Wiesner; Nicole Provis / Rennae Stubbs	2; 6	0; 6

=== South Korea vs. Czechoslovakia ===
South Korea
0
Waldstadion T.C., Frankfurt, Germany
15 July 1992
Clay (outdoors)

Czechoslovakia
3

			1	2	3
1	(South Korea) (Czechoslovakia)	Kim Yeon-sook; Helena Suková	1; 6	6^{3} 7^{7}
2	(South Korea) (Czechoslovakia)	Park Sung-hee; Jana Novotná	6; 4	2; 6	3; 6
3	(South Korea) (Czechoslovakia)	Kim Il-soon / Lee Jeong-myung; Jana Novotná / Andrea Strnadová	3; 6	3; 6

=== Germany vs. Netherlands ===
Germany
2
Waldstadion T.C., Frankfurt, Germany
15 July 1992
Clay (outdoors)

Netherlands
1

			1	2	3
1	(Germany) (Netherlands)	Anke Huber; Nicole Krijger-Jagerman	7; 5	3; 6	6; 1
2	(Germany) (Netherlands)	Steffi Graf; Brenda Schultz	6; 3	7^{8} 6^{6}
3	(Germany) (Netherlands)	Sabine Hack / Barbara Rittner; Nicole Krijger-Jagerman / Manon Bollegraf	6; 2	5; 7	4; 6

=== Poland vs. Sweden ===
Poland
2
Waldstadion T.C., Frankfurt, Germany
15 July 1992
Clay (outdoors)

Sweden
1

			1	2	3
1	(Poland) (Sweden)	Magdalena Feistel; Cecilia Dahlman	2; 6	1; 6
2	(Poland) (Sweden)	Katarzyna Nowak; Catarina Lindqvist	7^{7} 6^{4}	6^{4} 7^{7}	6; 3
3	(Poland) (Sweden)	Magdalena Feistel / Katarzyna Teodorowicz-Lisowska; Maria Lindström / Maria Strandlund	6; 3	6; 2

=== CIS vs. France ===
CIS
0
Waldstadion T.C., Frankfurt, Germany
15 July 1992
Clay (outdoors)

France
3

			1	2	3
1	(Commonwealth of Independent States) (France)	Elena Makarova; Mary Pierce	1; 6	2; 6
2	(Commonwealth of Independent States) (France)	Eugenia Maniokova; Nathalie Tauziat	1; 6	3; 6
3	(Commonwealth of Independent States) (France)	Elena Makarova / Elena Pogorelova; Isabelle Demongeot / Nathalie Tauziat	3; 6	3; 6

=== Denmark vs. United States ===
Denmark
0
Waldstadion T.C., Frankfurt, Germany
15 July 1992
Clay (outdoors)

United States
3

			1	2	3
1	(Denmark) (United States)	Karin Ptaszek; Gigi Fernández	6; 4	3; 6	0; 6
2	(Denmark) (United States)	Sofie Albinus; Lori McNeil	5; 7	0; 6
3	(Denmark) (United States)	Henriette Kjær Nielsen / Karin Ptaszek; Debbie Graham / Pam Shriver	4; 6	2; 6

== Quarterfinals ==
=== Spain vs. Argentina ===
Spain
2
Waldstadion T.C., Frankfurt, Germany
17 July 1992
Clay (outdoors)

Argentina
1

			1	2	3
1	(Spain) (Argentina)	Conchita Martínez; Florencia Labat	6; 0	6; 1
2	(Spain) (Argentina)	Arantxa Sánchez Vicario; Mercedes Paz	6; 2	6; 1
3	(Spain) (Argentina)	Noelia Pérez Peñate / Virginia Ruano Pascual; Mercedes Paz / Patricia Tarabini	4; 6	6^{7} 7^{9}

=== Australia vs. Czechoslovakia ===
Australia
2
Waldstadion T.C., Frankfurt, Germany
17 July 1992
Clay (outdoors)

Czechoslovakia
1

			1	2	3
1	(Australia) (Czechoslovakia)	Rachel McQuillan; Helena Suková	6^{6} 7^{8}	6; 4	1; 6
2	(Australia) (Czechoslovakia)	Nicole Provis; Jana Novotná	7; 5	6; 0
3	(Australia) (Czechoslovakia)	Nicole Provis / Rennae Stubbs; Jana Novotná / Andrea Strnadová	6; 3	6; 3

=== Germany vs. Poland ===
Germany
3
Waldstadion T.C., Frankfurt, Germany
16 July 1992
Clay (outdoors)

Poland
0

			1	2	3
1	(Germany) (Poland)	Anke Huber; Magdalena Feistel	6; 0	6; 3
2	(Germany) (Poland)	Steffi Graf; Katarzyna Nowak	6; 0	6; 0
3	(Germany) (Poland)	Steffi Graf / Anke Huber; Magdalena Feistel / Katarzyna Teodorowicz-Lisowska	6; 4	7; 5

=== France vs. United States ===
France
1
Waldstadion T.C., Frankfurt, Germany
16 July 1992
Clay (outdoors)

United States
2

			1	2	3
1	(France) (United States)	Mary Pierce; Gigi Fernández	1; 6	4; 6
2	(France) (United States)	Nathalie Tauziat; Lori McNeil	6; 4	7; 5
3	(France) (United States)	Isabelle Demongeot / Nathalie Tauziat; Gigi Fernández / Pam Shriver	4; 6	2; 6

== Semifinals ==
=== Spain vs. Australia ===
Spain
3
Waldstadion T.C., Frankfurt, Germany
18 July 1992
Clay (outdoors)

Australia
0

			1	2	3
1	(Spain) (Australia)	Conchita Martínez; Rachel McQuillan	6; 1	6; 4
2	(Spain) (Australia)	Arantxa Sánchez Vicario; Nicole Provis	6; 2	6; 0
3	(Spain) (Australia)	Virginia Ruano Pascual / Arantxa Sánchez Vicario; Jenny Byrne / Rennae Stubbs	6; 3	6; 3

=== Germany vs. United States ===
Germany
2
Waldstadion T.C., Frankfurt, Germany
18 July 1992
Clay (outdoors)

United States
1

			1	2	3
1	(Germany) (United States)	Anke Huber; Gigi Fernández	7; 5	6; 3
2	(Germany) (United States)	Steffi Graf; Lori McNeil	6; 0	6; 3
3	(Germany) (United States)	Sabine Hack / Barbara Rittner; Debbie Graham / Pam Shriver	2; 6	2; 6

== Final ==
=== Spain vs. Germany ===
Spain
1
Waldstadion T.C., Frankfurt, Germany
19 July 1992
Clay (outdoors)

Germany
2

			1	2	3
1	(Spain) (Germany)	Conchita Martínez; Anke Huber	3; 6	7^{7} 6^{0}	1; 6
2	(Spain) (Germany)	Arantxa Sánchez Vicario; Steffi Graf	4; 6	2; 6
3	(Spain) (Germany)	Conchita Martínez / Arantxa Sánchez Vicario; Anke Huber / Barbara Rittner	6; 1	6; 2

1992 Federation Cup Champions
(Germany)
Germany
Second title
