= 1992 Federation Cup Asia/Oceania Zone – Pool A =

Group A of the 1992 Federation Cup Asia/Oceania Zone was one of two pools in the Asia/Oceania zone of the 1992 Federation Cup. Four teams competed in a round robin competition, with the top two teams advancing to the knockout stage.

	(South Korea) KOR	(Philippines) PHI	(India) IND	(Malaysia) MAS	RR; W–L	Set; W–L	Game; W–L	Standings
South Korea		3–0	3–0	3–0	3–0	18–0	108–21	1
Philippines	0–3		3–0	2–0	2–1	8–6	65–63	2
India	0–3	0–3		3–0	1–2	6–12	67–79	3
Malaysia	0–3	0–2	0–3		0–3	0–14	12–89	4

== South Korea vs. Philippines ==
South Korea
3
National Tennis Centre, Colombo, Sri Lanka
4 May 1992
Clay (outdoors)

Philippines
0

			1	2	3
1	(South Korea) (Philippines)	Kim Il-soon; Francesca La'O	6; 0	6; 0
2	(South Korea) (Philippines)	Park Sung-hee; Jennifer Saret	6; 2	6; 3
3	(South Korea) (Philippines)	Kim Il-soon / Lee Jeong-myung; Francesca La'O / Jennifer Saret	6; 2	6; 3

== India vs. Malaysia ==
India
3
National Tennis Centre, Colombo, Sri Lanka
4 May 1992
Clay (outdoors)

Malaysia
0

			1	2	3
1	(India) (Malaysia)	Aradhana Reddy; Kim Cheah-sui	6; 2	6; 1
2	(India) (Malaysia)	Janaki Krishnamoorthy; Lee Tze-may	6; 1	6; 1
3	(India) (Malaysia)	Janaki Krishnamoorthy / Nirupama Vaidyanathan; Shak Ku-maizan / Kim Cheah-sui	6; 0	6; 0

== South Korea vs. Malaysia ==
South Korea
3
National Tennis Centre, Colombo, Sri Lanka
5 May 1992
Clay (outdoors)

Malaysia
0

			1	2	3
1	(South Korea) (Malaysia)	Kim Yeon-sook; Lee Tze-may	6; 0	6; 0
2	(South Korea) (Malaysia)	Park Sung-hee; Kim Cheah-sui	6; 2	6; 0
3	(South Korea) (Malaysia)	Kim Il-soon / Lee Jeong-myung; Shak Ku-maizan / Kim Cheah-sui	6; 0	6; 0

== Philippines vs. India ==
Philippines
3
National Tennis Centre, Colombo, Sri Lanka
5 May 1992
Clay (outdoors)

India
0

			1	2	3
1	(Philippines) (India)	Francesca La'O; Janaki Krishnamoorthy	6; 3	7^{10} 6^{8}
2	(Philippines) (India)	Jennifer Saret; Nirupama Vaidyanathan	7^{7} 6^{4}	6; 0
3	(Philippines) (India)	Francesca La'O / Jennifer Saret; Aradhana Reddy / Nirupama Vaidyanathan	6; 3	6; 4

== South Korea vs. India ==
South Korea
3
National Tennis Centre, Colombo, Sri Lanka
6 May 1992
Clay (outdoors)

India
0

			1	2	3
1	(South Korea) (India)	Kim Yeon-sook; Aradhana Reddy	6; 3	6; 2
2	(South Korea) (India)	Park Sung-hee; Janaki Krishnamoorthy	6; 0	6; 1
3	(South Korea) (India)	Kim Il-soon / Lee Jeong-myung; Janaki Krishnamoorthy / Nirupama Vaidyanathan	6; 3	6; 0

== Philippines vs. Malaysia ==
Philippines
2
National Tennis Centre, Colombo, Sri Lanka
6 May 1992
Clay (outdoors)

Malaysia
0

			1	2	3
1	(Philippines) (Malaysia)	Francesca La'O; Shak Ku-maizan	6; 1	6; 2
2	(Philippines) (Malaysia)	Jennifer Saret; Kim Cheah-sui	5; 2			retired
3	(Philippines) (Malaysia)					not played

== See also ==
- Fed Cup structure
