= Suzanne Italiano =

Canadian tennis player

Suzanne Italiano (born 19 March 1973) is a former professional tennis player from Canada.

She has career-high WTA rankings of 265 in singles, achieved on 10 February 1992, and 356 in doubles, reached on 6 May 1991.

She made her WTA Tour main-draw debut at the 1990 Canadian Open.

== ITF finals ==
$25,000 tournaments
$10,000 tournaments

=== Singles (2–1) ===
Result	No.	Date	Tournament	Surface	Opponent	Score
Win	1.	14 May 1990	Guadalajara, Mexico	Clay	(Venezuela) María Vento-Kabchi	6–7, 6–4, 6–3
Win	2.	3 June 1990	San Luis Potosí, Mexico	Hard	(Philippines) Jean Lozano	6–7, 6–0, 6–2
Loss	1.	8 December 1991	San Luis Potosí, Mexico	Hard	(Mexico) Angélica Gavaldón	2–6, 2–6

=== Doubles (0–3) ===
Result	No.	Date	Tournament	Surface	Partner	Opponents	Score
Loss	1.	21 May 1990	Aguascalientes, Mexico	Hard	(Cuba) Belkis Rodríguez	(Philippines) Jean Lozano (Mexico) Lupita Novelo	1–6, 1–6
Loss	2.	21 April 1991	Athens, Greece	Clay	(Greece) Christina Zachariadou	(Sweden) Catarina Bernstein (Sweden) Annika Narbe	7–5, 5–7, 5–7
Loss	3.	3 November 1996	Tampico Mexico	Clay	(United States) Susie Starrett	(United States) Amy Chiminello (United States) Tracee Lee	3–6, 4–6
