= Jean Lozano =

Filipino-American tennis player

- Full name: Jean Marie Lozano
- Country (sports): Philippines
- Born: 22 October 1967 (age 58)

Singles
- Highest ranking: No. 433 (26 Nov 1990)

Doubles
- Career titles: 4 ITF
- Highest ranking: No. 227 (1 April 1991)
Medal record
Southeast Asian Games
Gold medal – first place	1993 Singapore	Mixed doubles
Silver medal – second place	1993 Singapore	Women's team
Bronze medal – third place	1993 Singapore	Women's doubles

Jean Marie Lozano (born 22 October 1967) is a Filipino-American former professional tennis player.

Lozano, a three-time NCAA All-American at UC Berkeley, competed on the WTA Tour and ITF circuit during the late 1980s and early 1990s. She had best rankings of 433 for singles and 227 for doubles.

Originally from the Philippines, Lozano played Federation Cup tennis for her native country in 1993, appearing in ties against Thailand and Indonesia. She was a mixed doubles gold medalist at the 1993 Southeast Asian Games.

== ITF finals ==
=== Singles: 3 (0–3) ===
Outcome	No.	Date	Tournament	Surface	Opponent	Score
Runner-up	1.	May 1990	Aguascalientes, Mexico	Clay	(Venezuela) María Vento	6–3, 6–3
Runner-up	2.	Jun 1990	San Luis Potosí, Mexico	Hard	(Canada) Suzanne Italiano	6–7, 6–0, 6–2
Runner-up	3.	Oct 1991	Freeport, Bahamas	Hard	(United States) Jeri Ingram	0–6, 4–6

=== Doubles: 9 (4–5) ===
Outcome	No.	Date	Tournament	Surface	Partner	Opponents	Score
Winner	1.	May 1990	Aguascalientes, Mexico	Hard	(Mexico) Lupita Novelo	(Canada) Suzanne Italiano (Cuba) Belkis Rodríguez	6–1, 6–1
Winner	2.	Jun 1990	San Luis Potosí, Mexico	Hard	(Mexico) Lupita Novelo	(Mexico) Lucila Becerra (Brazil) Themis Zambrzycki	6–3, 4–6, 6–1
Runner-up	1.	Jul 1990	Mobile, United States	Hard	(Mexico) Lupita Novelo	(South Korea) Kim Il-soon (South Korea) Lee Jeong-myung	1–6, 0–6
Runner-up	2.	Jul 1990	Fayetteville, United States	Hard	(Mexico) Lupita Novelo	(South Korea) Kim Il-soon (South Korea) Lee Jeong-myung	6–4, 6–7^{(3)}, 3–6
Runner-up	3.	Jul 1990	Evansville, United States	Hard	(United States) Debbie Graham	(United States) Lea Antonoplis (South Africa) Robyn Field	6–3, 2–6, 3–6
Winner	3.	Jul 1991	Roanoke, United States	Hard	(United States) Stephanie Reece	(United States) Jeri Ingram (Australia) Shannon Peters	3–6, 6–2, 6–3
Runner-up	4.	Nov 1991	Kingston, Jamaica	Hard	(Puerto Rico) Emilie Viqueira	(Canada) Jillian Alexander (Netherlands) Claire Wegink	3–6, 1–6
Runner-up	5.	Dec 1991	San Luis Potosí, Mexico	Hard	(Germany) Cornelia Grunes	(Mexico) Xóchitl Escobedo (Mexico) Angélica Gavaldón	2–6, 6–7^{(7)}
Winner	4.	Nov 1992	Freeport, Bahamas	Hard	(United States) Lisa Albano	(Puerto Rico) Emilie Viqueira (Netherlands) Caroline Stassen	6–4, 6–4
