= Lupita Novelo =

Mexican tennis player

- Full name: Guadelupe Novelo Osuna
- Country (sports): Mexico
- Born: 5 May 1967 (age 58)
- Prize money: $72,441

Singles
- Career record: 77–56
- Highest ranking: No. 250 (16 November 1992)

Doubles
- Career record: 77–56
- Highest ranking: No. 92 (11 October 1993)

Grand Slam doubles results
- Australian Open: 1R (1992, 1993)
- French Open: 2R (1991)
- Wimbledon: 3R (1992)
- US Open: 2R (1993)

Guadelupe "Lupita" Novelo Osuna (born 5 May 1967) is a former professional tennis player from Mexico.

== Biography ==
Novelo comes from Ensenada in the Mexican state of Baja California, one of six children of Don Antonio and Ana María.

Moving to the United States, she attended the University of Southern California (USC) for four years on a scholarship, then in the early 1990s competed on the WTA Tour as well as in representative matches for Mexico.

She won three gold medals at the 1990 Central American and Caribbean Games and in the same year debuted for the Mexico Fed Cup team. Over three years she featured in a total of 14 Fed Cup ties. At the 1992 Summer Olympics in Barcelona she made it into the singles draw as a lucky loser, replacing Helen Kelesi who had become ill. She lost in the first round to number one seed Steffi Graf.

On the professional tour she was most successful in doubles, with a top ranking of 92 in the world. As a doubles player she featured in the main draw of all grand slam tournaments, with her best performance coming at the 1992 Wimbledon Championships, where she and Kristine Radford made the round of 16. She reached a career best singles ranking of 250 and had a win over Chanda Rubin at the 1992 European Open.

Following a period of time coaching in the United States, Novelo returned to her hometown of Ensenada, where she runs the family business, a hotel called Las Rosas Hotel & Spa.

== ITF finals ==
$25,000 tournaments
$10,000 tournaments

=== Doubles (8–6) ===
Result	No.	Date	Tournament	Surface	Partner	Opponents	Score
Win	1.	16 October 1989	Kuroshio, Japan	Hard	(United States) Lynn Nabors	(Japan) Ayako Hirose (Japan) Miki Mizokuchi	7–6^{(5)}, 6–4
Loss	1.	30 October 1989	Saga, Japan	Grass	(United States) Lynn Nabors	(Japan) Ei Iida (Japan) Naoko Sato	6–7^{(3)}, 6–4, 3–6
Loss	2.	6 November 1989	Matsuyama, Japan	Hard	(United States) Lynn Nabors	(South Korea) Kim Il-soon (South Korea) Lee Jeong-myung	1–6, 4–6
Win	2.	21 May 1990	Aguascalientes, Mexico	Hard	(Philippines) Jean Lozano	(Canada) Suzanne Italiano (Cuba) Belkis Rodríguez	6–1, 6–1
Win	3.	3 June 1990	San Luis Potosí, Mexico	Hard	(Philippines) Jean Lozano	(Mexico) Lucila Becerra (Brazil) Themis Zambrzycki	6–3, 4–6, 6–1
Loss	3.	2 July 1990	Mobile, United States	Hard	(Philippines) Jean Lozano	(South Korea) Kim Il-soon (South Korea) Lee Jeong-myung	1–6, 0–6
Loss	4.	9 July 1990	Fayetteville, United States	Hard	(Philippines) Jean Lozano	(South Korea) Kim Il-soon (South Korea) Lee Jeong-myung	6–4, 6–7^{(3)}, 3–6
Loss	5.	17 February 1991	Mildura, Australia	Grass	(United States) Betsy Somerville	(Australia) Kristine Kunce (Australia) Clare Thompson	6–7, 2–6
Win	4.	25 February 1991	Canberra, Australia	Grass	(United States) Betsy Somerville	(Australia) Tracey Rodgers (Australia) Alison Scott	7–5, 3–6, 6–4
Win	5.	4 March 1991	Broadmeadows, Australia	Grass	(United States) Betsy Somerville	(Australia) Kristine Kunce (Australia) Clare Thompson	6–2, 7–5
Win	6.	21 October 1991	Ōita, Japan	Hard	(Australia) Kristine Kunce	(Sweden) Maria Ekstrand (Germany) Sabine Lohmann	6–1, 7–5
Win	7.	30 September 1991	Saga, Japan	Grass	(Australia) Kristine Kunce	(Hong Kong) Tang Min (China) Li Fang	5–7, 6–2, 7–5
Win	8.	4 November 1991	Chiba, Japan	Hard	(Australia) Kristine Kunce	(Japan) Ayako Hirose (Japan) Yone Kamio	6–4, 5–7, 6–4
Loss	6.	24 November 1991	Nuriootpa, Australia	Hard	(United States) Terri O'Reilly	(Australia) Jo-Anne Faull (Australia) Rennae Stubbs	4–6, 5–7
