= Lee Jeong-soon =

South Korean tennis player

- Country (sports): South Korea
- Born: 23 February 1961 (age 64)
- Retired: 1989

Singles
- Career titles: 3 ITF
- Highest ranking: No. 359 (15 March 1987)

Doubles
- Career titles: 4 ITF
- Highest ranking: No. 284 (2 February 1987)
Medal record
Asian Games
Gold medal – first place	1986 Seoul	Mixed Doubles
Silver medal – second place	1986 Seoul	Women's Singles
Silver medal – second place	1986 Seoul	Women's Doubles
Silver medal – second place	1986 Seoul	Women's Team

Lee Jeong-soon (born 23 February 1961) is a South Korean former professional tennis player.

== Biography ==
Lee competed on the professional tour in the 1980s, which included a main draw appearance at the 1984 Santista Textile Open, a Virginia Slim tournament held in Rio de Janeiro. She made it through to the second round, where she was beaten by a 14-year old Gabriela Sabatini.

From 1984 to 1986 she featured in 12 ties for the South Korea Federation Cup team. During her Federation Cup career she registered seven singles wins, including victories over Argentina's Mercedes Paz and Brazil's Patricia Medrado.

At the 1986 Asian Games in Seoul, Lee won a total of four medals for South Korea, one of them a mixed doubles gold partnering Yoo Jin-sun.

== ITF finals ==
=== Singles (3–2) ===
Result	No.	Date	Tournament	Surface	Opponent	Score
Loss	1.	5 June 1984	Gwangju, South Korea	Clay	(South Korea) Kim Soo-ok	2–6, 6–3, 1–6
Loss	2.	1 June 1986	St. Simons, United States	Clay	(Canada) Marjorie Blackwood	1–6, 2–6
Win	1.	22 June 1986	Fayetteville, United States	Hard	(Poland) Renata Baranski	6–4, 4–6, 6–2
Win	2.	18 June 1989	Incheon, South Korea	Clay	(South Korea) Park Mal-sim	6–2, 6–4
Win	3.	25 June 1989	Gwangju, South Korea	Clay	(South Korea) Park Mal-sim	6–4, 6–3

=== Doubles (4–2) ===
Result	No.	Date	Tournament	Surface	Partner	Opponents	Score
Win	1.	28 May 1984	Incheon, South Korea	Clay	(South Korea) Kim Soo-ok	(South Korea) Seol Min-kyung (South Korea) Shin Soon-ho	6–4, 6–2
Win	2.	5 June 1984	Gwangju, South Korea	Clay	(South Korea) Kim Soo-ok	(South Korea) Seol Min-kyung (South Korea) Shin Soon-ho	4–6, 6–3, 6–2
Loss	1.	1 June 1986	St. Simons, United States	Clay	(South Korea) Park Jun-re	(United States) Alissa Finerman (United States) Anna Ivan	1–6, 3–6
Win	3.	8 June 1986	Miramar, United States	Hard	(South Korea) Park Jun-re	(Canada) Marjorie Blackwood (Australia) Susan Leo	4–6, 7–5, 6–3
Win	4.	18 June 1989	Incheon, South Korea	Clay	(South Korea) Park Mal-sim	(South Korea) Park Yang-ja (South Korea) Han Eun-ju	6–3, 6–1
Loss	2.	25 June 1989	Gwangju, South Korea	Clay	(South Korea) Park Mal-sim	(South Korea) Park Yang-ja (South Korea) Han Eun-ju	4–6, 1–6
