= Angélica Gavaldón =

Mexican tennis player (born 1973)

- Full name: Angélica Gavaldón Loaiza
- Country (sports): Mexico
- Born: 3 October 1973 (age 52) El Centro, California, U.S.
- Retired: 2000
- Plays: Right-handed
- Prize money: $504,376

Singles
- Career record: 184-162
- Career titles: 0 WTA, 3 ITF
- Highest ranking: No. 34 (1 January 1996)

Grand Slam singles results
- Australian Open: QF (1990, 1995)
- French Open: 2R (1994)
- Wimbledon: 3R (1990, 1995)
- US Open: 3R (1995)

Doubles
- Career record: 10–7
- Career titles: 0 WTA, 1 ITF
- Highest ranking: No. 236 (11 March 1991)

Angélica Gavaldón Loaiza (born 3 October 1973) is a Mexican retired tennis player.

Gavaldón has dual nationality, was born in the United States and comes from a Mexican family, and turned pro in 1990. That same year, she qualified for the quarterfinals in the 1990 Australian Open, from which she was eliminated in a match against Claudia Porwik. Her greatest career achievement is widely considered to be the 1995 Australian Open, when she again came through the qualifying tournament to reach the quarter-finals; this helped raise her year-end ranking for 1995 to 36th in the world and marked the peak of her Grand Slam. Her one tournament win came in Tashkent in June 1997. She played for Mexico in the Federation Cup from 1990 to 1997, and at the Olympic Games in 1992 and 1996.

Since retiring in 2000, Gavaldon has become a coach to other tennis players, and she released her own clothing label Angalo Activewear in 2007.

== ITF finals ==
=== Singles: 4 (3-1) ===
$100,000 tournaments
$75,000 tournaments
$50,000 tournaments
$25,000 tournaments
$10,000 tournaments

Result	No.	Date	Tournament	Surface	Opponent	Score
Win	1.	8 December 1991	San Luis Potosí, Mexico	Hard	(Canada) Suzanne Italiano	6–2, 6–2
Win	2.	25 October 1992	San Luis Potosí, Mexico	Hard	(Canada) Maureen Drake	6–1, 6–4
Loss	3.	27 April 1997	Monterrey, Mexico	Clay	(United States) Sandra Cacic	3–6, 2–6
Win	4.	2 June 1997	Tashkent, Uzbekistan	Hard	(Israel) Anna Smashnova	6–3, 6–2

=== Doubles: 1 (1-0) ===
Result	No.	Date	Tournament	Surface	Partner	Opponents	Score
Win	1.	8 December 1991	San Luis Potosí, Mexico	Hard	(Mexico) Xóchitl Escobedo	(Germany) Cornelia Grünes (Philippines) Jean Lozano	6–2, 7–6^{(9–7)}
