= 1992 Federation Cup Asia/Oceania Zone – Pool B =

Group B of the 1992 Federation Cup Asia/Oceania Zone was one of two pools in the Asia/Oceania zone of the 1992 Federation Cup. Four teams competed in a round robin competition, with the top two teams advancing to the knockout stage.

| | (Sri Lanka) SRI | (Chinese Taipei) TPE | (Thailand) THA | (Hong Kong) HKG | RR; W–L | Set; W–L | Game; W–L | Standings |
| Sri Lanka | | 3–0 | 2–1 | 3–0 | 3–0 | 15–4 | 112–73 | 1 |
| Chinese Taipei | 0–3 | | 3–0 | 2–1 | 2–1 | 11–9 | 94–84 | 2 |
| Thailand | 1–2 | 0–3 | | 2–1 | 1–2 | 8–11 | 77–89 | 3 |
| Hong Kong | 0–3 | 1–2 | 1–2 | | 0–3 | 4–14 | 59–96 | 4 |

== Sri Lanka vs. Chinese Taipei ==
Sri Lanka
3
National Tennis Centre, Colombo, Sri Lanka
4 May 1992
Clay (outdoors)

Chinese Taipei
0

| | | | 1 | 2 | 3 |
|---|---|---|---|---|---|
| 1 | (Sri Lanka) (Chinese Taipei) | Saranga Sangakkara; Lin Ya-hui | 6; 4 | 6^{4} 7^{7} | 6; 3 |
| 2 | (Sri Lanka) (Chinese Taipei) | Lihini Weerasuriya; Wang Shi-ting | 6; 2 | 6; 1 |
| 3 | (Sri Lanka) (Chinese Taipei) | Vajira Premaratne / Lihini Weerasuriya; Ho Chiu-mei / Wang Shi-ting | 6; 4 | 6; 3 |

== Thailand vs. Hong Kong ==
Thailand
2
National Tennis Centre, Colombo, Sri Lanka
4 May 1992
Clay (outdoors)

Hong Kong
1

| | | | 1 | 2 | 3 |
|---|---|---|---|---|---|
| 1 | (Thailand) (Hong Kong) | Benjamas Sangaram; Alexandra Kleffel | 6; 2 | 6; 1 |
| 2 | (Thailand) (Hong Kong) | Suvimol Duangchan; Chan Lee | 6; 1 | 6; 2 |
| 3 | (Thailand) (Hong Kong) | Suvimol Duangchan / Nipada Kaewborisut; Chan Lee / Paulette Moreno | 3; 6 | 0; 6 |

== Sri Lanka vs. Hong Kong ==
Sri Lanka
3
National Tennis Centre, Colombo, Sri Lanka
5 May 1992
Clay (outdoors)

Hong Kong
0

| | | | 1 | 2 | 3 |
|---|---|---|---|---|---|
| 1 | (Sri Lanka) (Hong Kong) | Vajira Premaratne; Chan Lee | 7; 5 | 6; 1 |
| 2 | (Sri Lanka) (Hong Kong) | Lihini Weerasuriya; Paulette Moreno | 6; 1 | 7; 5 |
| 3 | (Sri Lanka) (Hong Kong) | Sobhini de Silva / Vajira Premaratne; Chan Lee / Paulette Moreno | 6; 3 | 7^{7} 6^{3} |

== Chinese Taipei vs. Thailand ==
Chinese Taipei
2
National Tennis Centre, Colombo, Sri Lanka
5 May 1992
Clay (outdoors)

Thailand
1

| | | | 1 | 2 | 3 |
|---|---|---|---|---|---|
| 1 | (Chinese Taipei) (Thailand) | Ho Chiu-mei; Benjamas Sangaram | 6; 3 | 3; 6 | 6; 3 |
| 2 | (Chinese Taipei) (Thailand) | Wang Shi-ting; Suvimol Duangchan | 6; 2 | 6; 2 |
| 3 | (Chinese Taipei) (Thailand) | Ho Chiu-mei / Wang Shi-ting; Nipada Kaewborisut / Benjamas Sangaram | 6; 1 | 7; 5 |

== Sri Lanka vs. Thailand ==
Sri Lanka
2
National Tennis Centre, Colombo, Sri Lanka
6 May 1992
Clay (outdoors)

Thailand
1

| | | | 1 | 2 | 3 |
|---|---|---|---|---|---|---|
| 1 | (Sri Lanka) (Thailand) | Saranga Sangakkara; Benjamas Sangaram | 6; 2 | 4; 6 | 2; 6 |
| 2 | (Sri Lanka) (Thailand) | Lihini Weerasuriya; Suvimol Duangchan | 7^{7} 6^{5} | 6^{4} 7^{7} | 6; 1 |
| 3 | (Sri Lanka) (Thailand) | Vajira Premaratne / Lihini Weerasuriya; Nipada Kaewborisut / Benjamas Sangaram | | | | w/o |

== Chinese Taipei vs. Hong Kong ==
Chinese Taipei
2
National Tennis Centre, Colombo, Sri Lanka
6 May 1992
Clay (outdoors)

Hong Kong
1

| | | | 1 | 2 | 3 |
|---|---|---|---|---|---|
| 1 | (Chinese Taipei) (Hong Kong) | Ho Chiu-mei; Chan Lee | 4; 6 | 2; 6 |
| 2 | (Chinese Taipei) (Hong Kong) | Wang Shi-ting; Paulette Moreno | 6; 3 | 6; 0 |
| 3 | (Chinese Taipei) (Hong Kong) | Ho Chiu-mei / Wang Shi-ting; Chan Lee / Paulette Moreno | 6; 3 | 6; 2 |

== See also ==
- Fed Cup structure
