= Park Mal-sim =

South Korean tennis player

- Country (sports): South Korea
- Born: 15 July 1965 (age 59)
- Retired: 1993
- Prize money: $11,916

Singles
- Career record: 45-24
- Career titles: 4 ITF
- Highest ranking: No. 386 (28 October 1991)

Doubles
- Career record: 8-7
- Career titles: 2 ITF
- Highest ranking: No. 604 (21 June 1993)
Medal record
Asian Games
| Bronze medal – third place | 1990 Beijing | Women's Singles |
| Bronze medal – third place | 1990 Beijing | Women's Team |

Park Mal-sim (born 15 July 1965) is a South Korean former professional tennis player.

Park appeared in seven ties for South Korea in the Federation Cup, four in 1988 and three in 1990. All of her matches were in singles and she won four rubbers, which included a win over Japan's top player Etsuko Inoue.

On the professional tour, Park reached a best singles ranking of 386 and won four ITF titles.

At the 1990 Asian Games in Beijing she won a singles bronze medal for South Korea and was also a member of the bronze medal winners in the team event.

== ITF finals ==
=== Singles (4–2) ===
| Outcome | No. | Date | Tournament | Surface | Opponent | Score |
|---|---|---|---|---|---|---|
| Winner | 1. | 19 June 1988 | Birmingham, United States | Clay | (United States) Anna Ivan | 6–3, 0–6, 6–2 |
| Runner-up | 1. | 18 June 1989 | Incheon, South Korea | Clay | (South Korea) Lee Jeong-soon | 2–6, 4–6 |
| Runner-up | 2. | 25 June 1989 | Gwangju, South Korea | Clay | (South Korea) Lee Jeong-soon | 4–6, 3–6 |
| Winner | 2. | 17 June 1990 | Incheon, South Korea | Clay | (South Korea) Choi Jeom-sang | 6–2, 6–0 |
| Winner | 3. | 9 June 1991 | Gwangju, South Korea | Clay | (South Korea) Kim Yeon-sook | 7–5, 6–3 |
| Winner | 4. | 16 June 1991 | Incheon, South Korea | Clay | (South Korea) Lee Jeong-myung | 6–4, 6–1 |

=== Doubles (2–1) ===
| Outcome | No. | Date | Tournament | Surface | Partner | Opponents | Score |
|---|---|---|---|---|---|---|---|
| Winner | 1. | 18 June 1989 | Incheon, South Korea | Clay | (South Korea) Lee Jeong-soon | (South Korea) Park Yang-ja (South Korea) Han Eun-ju | 6–3, 6–1 |
| Runner-up | 1. | 25 June 1989 | Gwangju, South Korea | Clay | (South Korea) Lee Jeong-soon | (South Korea) Park Yang-ja (South Korea) Han Eun-ju | 4–6, 1–6 |
| Winner | 2. | 17 June 1990 | Incheon, South Korea | Clay | (South Korea) Sohn Mi-ae | (South Korea) Choi Eul-seon (South Korea) Han Eun-ju | 6–1, 6–2 |
