= Kim Il-soon =

South Korean tennis player (born 1969)

- Country (sports): South Korea
- Born: 24 January 1969 (age 56); South Korea
- Retired: 2000
- Plays: Right-handed
- Prize money: $45,782

Singles
- Career record: 116-51
- Career titles: 6 ITF
- Highest ranking: No. 201 (14 January 1991)

Doubles
- Career record: 120-31
- Career titles: 21 ITF
- Highest ranking: No. 157 (24 April 1995)

Kim Il-soon (Korean: 김일순; born January 24, 1969) is a retired female tennis player from South Korea, who twice represented her native country at the Summer Olympics: in 1988 and 1992.

== ITF finals ==
Legend
$25,000 tournaments
$10,000 tournaments

=== Singles (6–4) ===
Result	No.	Date	Tournament	Surface	Opponent	Score
Win	1.	14 August 1989	ITF Chatham, United States	Hard	(United States) Reka Monoki	6–3, 6–2
Loss	2.	18 June 1990	ITF St. Simons, United States	Clay	(United States) Debbie Graham	6–7, 1–6
Win	3.	2 July 1990	ITF Mobile, United States	Hard	(United States) Paloma Collantes	6–4, 6–4
Loss	4.	5 August 1991	ITF Taipei, Taiwan	Hard	(Chinese Taipei) Wang Shi-ting	6–4, 4–6, 4–6
Loss	5.	19 August 1991	ITF Taipei, Taiwan	Clay	(Chinese Taipei) Wang Shi-ting	2–6, 6–2, 2–6
Win	6.	8 June 1992	ITF Seoul, South Korea	Hard	(South Korea) Park Sung-hee	6–4, 6–3
Win	7.	8 February 1993	ITF Surakarta, Indonesia	Hard	(South Korea) Kim Soon-mi	6–4, 6–2
Win	8.	3 October 1994	ITF Ibaraki, Japan	Hard	(Australia) Annabel Ellwood	7–5, 7–6^{(5)}
Win	9.	17 October 1994	ITF Kugayama, Japan	Hard	(Japan) Miho Saeki	6–4, 6–0
Loss	10.	24 October 1994	ITF Kyoto, Japan	Hard	(Australia) Annabel Ellwood	4–6, 6–7

=== Doubles (21–2) ===
Result	No.	Date	Tournament	Surface	Partner	Opponents	Score
Win	1.	13 June 1988	ITF Birmingham, Great Britain	Clay	(South Korea) Lee Jeong-myung	(United States) Alissa Finerman (United States) Kay Louthian	6–1, 6–3
Win	2.	20 June 1988	ITF Mobile, United States	Hard	(South Korea) Lee Jeong-myung	(United States) Renata Baranski (Australia) Robyn Lamb	7–5, 6–2
Win	3.	27 June 1988	ITF Augusta, United States	Hard	(South Korea) Lee Jeong-myung	(France) Sophie Amiach (United States) Lisa Bobby	6–1, 6–2
Win	4.	6 February 1989	Midland, United States	Hard (i)	(South Korea) Lee Jeong-myung	(United States) Meredith McGrath (United States) Shaun Stafford	2–6, 6–2, 6–4
Win	5.	6 November 1989	Matsuyama, Japan	Hard	(South Korea) Lee Jeong-myung	(United States) Lynn Nabors (Mexico) Lupita Novelo	6–1, 6–4
Loss	6.	30 April 1990	Bangkok, Thailand	Hard	(South Korea) Lee Jeong-myung	(New Zealand) Julie Richardson (United States) Jane Thomas	4–6, 4–6
Win	7.	18 June 1990	St. Simons, United States	Clay	(South Korea) Lee Jeong-myung	(United States) Shannan McCarthy (United States) Stacey Schefflin	6–2, 2–6, 6–4
Win	8.	2 July 1990	Mobile, United States	Hard	(South Korea) Lee Jeong-myung	(Philippines) Jean Lozano (Mexico) Lupita Novelo	6–1, 6–0
Win	9.	9 July 1990	Fayetteville, United States	Hard	(South Korea) Lee Jeong-myung	(Philippines) Jean Lozano (Mexico) Lupita Novelo	4–6, 7–6^{(3)}, 6–3
Win	10.	3 June 1991	Gwangju, South Korea	Clay	(South Korea) Lee Jeong-myung	(South Korea) Choi Eul-seon (South Korea) Han Eun-ju	6–1, 6–3
Win	11.	10 June 1991	Seoul, South Korea	Clay	(South Korea) Lee Jeong-myung	(South Korea) Choi Eul-seon (South Korea) Han Eun-ju	6–2, 4–6, 7–5
Win	12.	5 August 1991	Taipei, Taiwan	Clay	(South Korea) Sohn Mi-ae	(South Korea) Jeung Hwa-ju (South Korea) Lee Jeong-myung	7–5, 6–2
Win	13.	19 August 1991	Taipei, Taiwan	Clay	(South Korea) Sohn Mi-ae	(South Korea) Jeung Hwa-ju (South Korea) Lee Jeong-myung	6–0, 7–6^{(3)}
Win	14.	26 August 1991	Taipei, Taiwan	Clay	(South Korea) Sohn Mi-ae	(South Korea) Park Sung-hee (South Korea) Pyo Hye-jeong	7–5, 6–4
Win	15.	1 June 1992	Seoul, South Korea	Clay	(South Korea) Lee Jeong-myung	(Indonesia) Romana Tedjakusuma (Indonesia) Suzanna Wibowo	6–3, 6–3
Win	16.	8 June 1992	Seoul, South Korea	Hard	(South Korea) Lee Jeong-myung	(Indonesia) Romana Tedjakusuma (Indonesia) Suzanna Wibowo	6–3, 6–4
Win	17.	8 February 1993	Surakarta, Indonesia	Hard	(South Korea) Kim Soon-mi	(Indonesia) Romana Tedjakusuma (Indonesia) Natalia Soetrisno	6–3, 6–2
Win	18.	24 January 1994	Surakarta, Indonesia	Hard	(South Korea) Choi Ju-yeon	(Indonesia) Natalia Soetrisno (Indonesia) Suzanna Wibowo	6–0, 2–6, 6–4
Win	19.	30 May 1994	Daegu, South Korea	Clay	(South Korea) Park Sung-hee	(South Korea) Kim Soon-mi (South Korea) Pyo Hye-jeong	6–7^{(1)}, 6–1, 6–4
Win	20.	6 June 1994	Seoul, South Korea	Hard	(South Korea) Kim Yeon-sook	(South Korea) Lee Eun-jeong (South Korea) Shin Bo-kyung	6–7^{(2)}, 6–1, 6–0
Win	21.	3 October 1994	ITF Ibaraki, Japan	Hard	(Japan) Yoriko Yamagishi	(Japan) Shinobu Asagoe (Japan) Haruka Inoue	6–2, 6–1
Win	22.	10 October 1994	ITF Kuroshio, Japan	Hard	(Japan) Yuka Tanaka	(South Korea) Park In-sook (Japan) Yoshiko Sasano	6–1, 6–1
Loss	23.	17 October 1994	ITF Kugayama, Japan	Hard	(South Korea) Park In-sook	(Australia) Annabel Ellwood (Australia) Trudi Musgrave	4–6, 0–6
