= Lee Jeong-myung =

South Korean tennis player

- Country (sports): South Korea
- Born: 8 September 1967 Anyang, South Korea
- Died: 12 January 2016 (aged 48)
- Retired: 1992
- Plays: Right-handed
- Prize money: $13,851

Singles
- Career record: 36-22
- Highest ranking: No. 421 (30 July 1990)

Doubles
- Career record: 75-18
- Career titles: 0 WTA, 12 ITF
- Highest ranking: No. 183 (6 August 1990)
Medal record
Representing South Korea
Asian Games
Silver medal – second place	1990 Beijing	Doubles
Bronze medal – third place	1990 Beijing	Team
Summer Universiade
Gold medal – first place	1991 Sheffield	Doubles
Bronze medal – third place	1987 Zagreb	Singles

Lee Jeong-myung (Korean: 이정명, 8 September 1967 – 12 January 2016) was a tennis player from South Korea, who represented her native country at the 1988 Summer Olympics in Seoul, South Korea.

== ITF finals ==
Legend
$25,000 tournaments
$10,000 tournaments

=== Singles (0–1) ===
Result	No.	Date	Tournament	Surface	Opponent	Score
Loss	1.	16 June 1991	Incheon, South Korea	Hard	(South Korea) Park Mal-sim	4-6, 1-6

=== Doubles (12–3) ===
Result	No.	Date	Tournament	Surface	Partner	Opponents	Score
Win	1.	13 June 1988	Birmingham, Great Britain	Clay	(South Korea) Kim Il-soon	(United States) Alissa Finerman (United States) Kay Louthian	6–1, 6–3
Win	2.	20 June 1988	Mobile, United States	Hard	(South Korea) Kim Il-soon	(United States) Renata Baranski (Australia) Robyn Lamb	7–5, 6–2
Win	3.	27 June 1988	Augusta, United States	Hard	(South Korea) Kim Il-soon	(France) Sophie Amiach (United States) Lisa Bobby	6–1, 6–2
Win	4.	6 February 1989	Midland, United States	Hard (i)	(South Korea) Kim Il-soon	(United States) Meredith McGrath (United States) Shaun Stafford	2–6, 6–2, 6–4
Win	5.	6 November 1989	Matsuyama, Japan	Hard	(South Korea) Kim Il-soon	(United States) Lynn Nabors (Mexico) Lupita Novelo	6–1, 6–4
Loss	6.	30 April 1990	Bangkok, Thailand	Hard	(South Korea) Kim Il-soon	(New Zealand) Julie Richardson (United States) Jane Thomas	4–6, 4–6
Win	7.	18 June 1990	St. Simons, United States	Clay	(South Korea) Kim Il-soon	(United States) Shannan McCarthy (United States) Stacey Schefflin	6–2, 2–6, 6–4
Win	8.	2 July 1990	Mobile, United States	Hard	(South Korea) Kim Il-soon	(Philippines) Jean Lozano (Mexico) Lupita Novelo	6–1, 6–0
Win	9.	9 July 1990	Fayetteville, United States	Hard	(South Korea) Kim Il-soon	(Philippines) Jean Lozano (Mexico) Lupita Novelo	4–6, 7–6^{(3)}, 6–3
Win	10.	3 June 1991	Gwangju, South Korea	Clay	(South Korea) Kim Il-soon	(South Korea) Choi Eul-seon (South Korea) Han Eun-ju	6–1, 6–3
Win	11.	10 June 1991	Seoul, South Korea	Clay	(South Korea) Kim Il-soon	(South Korea) Choi Eul-seon (South Korea) Han Eun-ju	6–2, 4–6, 7–5
Loss	12.	5 August 1991	Taipei, Taiwan	Clay	(South Korea) Jeung Hwa-ju	(South Korea) Kim Il-soon (South Korea) Sohn Mi-ae	5–7, 2–6
Loss	13.	19 August 1991	Taipei, Taiwan	Clay	(South Korea) Jeung Hwa-ju	(South Korea) Kim Il-soon (South Korea) Sohn Mi-ae	0–6, 6–7^{(3)}
Win	14.	1 June 1992	Seoul, South Korea	Clay	(South Korea) Kim Il-soon	(Indonesia) Romana Tedjakusuma (Indonesia) Suzanna Wibowo	6–3, 6–3
Win	15.	8 June 1992	Seoul, South Korea	Hard	(South Korea) Kim Il-soon	(Indonesia) Romana Tedjakusuma (Indonesia) Suzanna Wibowo	6–3, 6–4
