= Choi Young-ja =

South Korean tennis player

- Country (sports): South Korea
- Born: 30 May 1975 (age 50); Seoul, South Korea
- Height: 1.70 m (5 ft 7 in)
- Retired: 2006
- Plays: Right-handed
- Prize money: $95,879

Singles
- Career record: 213-105
- Career titles: 8 ITF
- Highest ranking: No. 178 (20 May 1996)

Doubles
- Career record: 131-85
- Career titles: 12 ITF
- Highest ranking: No. 136 (27 July 1998)

- Choi Young-ja
- Hangul: 최영자
- Hanja: 崔榮子
- RR: Choe Yeongja
- MR: Ch'oe Yŏngja

Choi Young-ja (born 30 May 1975) is a former professional tennis player from South Korea.

== Biography ==
A right-handed player from Seoul, Choi began playing tennis at the age of 10. She won her first ITF tournament at Bangkok in 1993 and began touring professionally after graduating from high school in 1994.

At the 1996 Summer Olympics in Atlanta she made the second round of the singles competition, with a win over South Africa's Joannette Kruger, before she was eliminated by 11th seed Brenda Schultz-McCarthy of the Netherlands.

Choi represented the South Korea Fed Cup team in a total of 16 ties. She was most successful in Fed Cup tennis as a doubles player, losing only one of her 12 matches. In singles she won three rubbers, one of which was against Li Na in 1999.

She won the women's doubles gold medal at the 2002 Asian Games and was also a bronze medalist in the team competition.

== ITF finals ==
=== Singles (8-12) ===
Legend
$50,000 tournaments
$25,000 tournaments
$10,000 tournaments

| Result | No. | Date | Tournament | Surface | Opponent | Score |
|---|---|---|---|---|---|---|
| Win | 1. | 28 November 1993 | Bangkok, Thailand | Hard | (South Korea) Jeon Mi-ra | 2-6, 6-4, 6-3 |
| Win | 2. | 30 January 1994 | Bandung, Indonesia | Hard | (South Korea) Kim Soon-mi | 7-6, 6-1 |
| Win | 3. | 29 May 1994 | Nanjing, China | Hard | (China) Li Yan-ling | 6-4, 1-6, 6-1 |
| Loss | 4. | 6 June 1994 | Seoul, South Korea | Hard | (South Korea) Kim Eun-ha | 3–6, 5–7 |
| Loss | 5. | 21 May 1995 | Beijing, China | Hard | (China) Wen Yuan | 6-4, 6-4 |
| Loss | 6. | 28 May 1995 | Beijing, China | Hard | (China) Li Li | 2–6, 3–6 |
| Loss | 7. | 4 June 1995 | Seoul, South Korea | Hard | (South Korea) Kim Eun-ha | 2–6, 2–6 |
| Loss | 8. | 17 March 1996 | Taipei, Chinese Taipei | Hard | (Chinese Taipei) Weng Tzu-ting | 1-6, 6-3, 4-6 |
| Win | 9. | 24 March 1996 | Bandar Seri Begawan, Brunei | Hard | (Germany) Christiane Hofmann | 1–6, 6–1, 6–3 |
| Win | 10. | 31 March 1996 | Jakarta, Indonesia | Hard | (South Korea) Cho Yoon-jeong | 6–2, 6–1 |
| Loss | 11. | 1 April 1996 | Jakarta, Indonesia | Hard | (Japan) Saori Obata | 2-6, 2-6 |
| Loss | 12. | 6 May 1996 | Seoul, South Korea | Clay | (South Korea) Kim Eun-ha | 6–2, 2–6, 3–6 |
| Loss | 13. | 23 March 1997 | Noda, Japan | Hard | (Australia) Kerry-Anne Guse | 6-0, 4-6, 2-6 |
| Loss | 14. | 6 April 1997 | Jakarta, Indonesia | Hard | (South Korea) Cho Yoon-jeong | 4-6, 1-6 |
| Win | 15. | 13 April 1997 | Jakarta, Indonesia | Hard | (South Korea) Cho Yoon-jeong | 6-1, 7-5 |
| Loss | 16. | 28 March 1999 | Seoul, South Korea | Clay | (South Korea) Choi Jin-young | 6–4, 4–6, 1–6 |
| Win | 17. | 21 November 1999 | Haibara, Japan | Carpet | (Japan) Kumiko Iijima | 6–3, 6–4 |
| Loss | 18. | 27 February 2000 | Jakarta, Indonesia | Hard | (South Korea) Chae Kyung-yee | 6–1, 3–6, 1–6 |
| Win | 19. | 11 June 2000 | Incheon, South Korea | Hard | (South Korea) Chung Yang-jin | 6-1, 6-2 |
| Loss | 20. | 13 August 2000 | Nonthaburi, Thailand | Hard | (South Korea) Jeon Mi-ra | 1-6, 3-6 |

=== Doubles (12-12) ===
| Result | No. | Date | Tournament | Surface | Partner | Opponent | Score |
|---|---|---|---|---|---|---|---|
| Loss | 1. | 23 May 1994 | Beijing, China | Hard | (South Korea) Choi Ju-yeon | (China) Bi Ying (China) Li Li | 6-7, 7-6, 4-6 |
| Win | 2. | 29 May 1994 | Nanjing, China | Hard | (South Korea) Choi Ju-yeon | (South Korea) Jeon Mi-ra (South Korea) Yoo Kyung-sook | 6-2, 6-3 |
| Loss | 3. | 29 May 1995 | Seoul, South Korea | Hard | (South Korea) Choi Jin | (South Korea) Kim Ih-sook (South Korea) Kim Eun-ha | 4-6, 5-7 |
| Win | 4. | 18 March 1996 | Bandar Seri Begawan, Brunei | Hard | (South Korea) Kum Ok-im | (Japan) Nao Akahori (Japan) Keiko Ishida | 5-7, 1-6 |
| Loss | 5. | 5 May 1996 | Seoul, South Korea | Hard | (Thailand) Benjamas Sangaram | (Australia) Catherine Barclay (Australia) Kerry-Anne Guse | 1-6, 2-6 |
| Loss | 6. | 23 March 1997 | Noda, Japan | Hard | (South Korea) Jeon Mi-ra | (Japan) Yuko Hosoki (Japan) Keiko Nagatomi | 2-6, 2-6 |
| Loss | 7. | 5 May 1997 | Seoul, South Korea | Clay | (South Korea) Park Sung-hee | (South Korea) Cho Yoon-jeong (South Korea) Kim Eun-ha | 3–6, 6–7^{(6)} |
| Win | 8. | 4 August 1997 | Jakarta, Indonesia | Clay | (South Korea) Kim Eun-ha | (Australia) Kerry-Anne Guse (Australia) Kristine Kunce | 6–3, 6–4 |
| Win | 9. | 15 September 1997 | Taipei, Taiwan | Hard | (South Korea) Kim Eun-ha | (Australia) Kerry-Anne Guse (Australia) Catherine Barclay | 1–6, 6–4, 6–3 |
| Loss | 10. | 18 October 1998 | Seoul, South Korea | Clay | (Australia) Catherine Barclay | (Japan) Shinobu Asagoe (Germany) Kirstin Freye | 2-6, 6-7 |
| Win | 11. | 28 March 1999 | Seoul, South Korea | Clay | (South Korea) Kim Eun-sook | (Japan) Tomoe Hotta (Japan) Hiroko Mochizuki | 6-4, 7-5 |
| Loss | 12. | 9 May 1999 | Seoul, South Korea | Clay | (South Korea) Kim Eun-sook | (France) Samantha Schoeffel (Uzbekistan) Iroda Tulyaganova | 3–6, 6–4, 4–6 |
| Loss | 13. | 21 November 1999 | Haibara, Japan | Carpet | (South Korea) Kim Eun-sook | (Japan) Maki Arai (Japan) Kumiko Iijima | 2-6, 0-6 |
| Loss | 14. | 20 February 2000 | Jakarta, Indonesia | Hard | (South Korea) Kim Eun-sook | (Indonesia) Yayuk Basuki (Indonesia) Irawati Iskandar | 5–7, 5–7 |
| Win | 15. | 18 June 2000 | Seoul, South Korea | Hard | (South Korea) Kim Eun-sook | (South Korea) Chae Kyung-yee (South Korea) Chang Kyung-mi | 6–0, 6–0 |
| Loss | 16. | 13 August 2000 | Nonthabuiri, Thailand | Hard | (South Korea) Kim Eun-sook | (South Korea) Jeon Mi-ra (South Korea) Chae Kyung-yee | 3–6, 2–6 |
| Win | 17. | 20 August 2000 | Nonthabuiri, Thailand | Hard | (South Korea) Kim Eun-sook | (South Korea) Jeon Mi-ra (South Korea) Chae Kyung-yee | 1–6, 6–1, 6–1 |
| Loss | 18. | 10 June 2001 | Hilton Head, United States | Hard | (South Korea) Jeon Mi-ra | (United States) Kristy Blumberg (United States) Karin Miller | 4–6, 6–7^{(1)} |
| Win | 19. | 17 June 2001 | Mount Pleasant, United States | Hard | (South Korea) Jeon Mi-ra | (United States) Jane Chi (Russia) Lioudmila Skavronskaia | 6–7^{(2)}, 6–2, 6–2 |
| Win | 20. | 24 June 2001 | Easton, United States | Hard | (South Korea) Jeon Mi-ra | (United States) Kristy Blumberg (United States) Karin Miller | 6-1, 6-1 |
| Win | 21. | 16 September 2001 | Seoul, South Korea | Hard | (South Korea) Kim Eun-sook | (Japan) Rika Hiraki (South Korea) Kim Eun-ha | 6–3, 6–3 |
| Winner | 22. | 25 February 2002 | New Delhi, India | Hard | (South Korea) Kim Eun-ha | (Czech Republic) Eva Birnerová (Czech Republic) Jana Hlaváčková | 6–7^{(4)}, 6–4, 6–3 |
| Loss | 23. | 2 June 2002 | Tianjin, China | Hard (i) | (South Korea) Choi Jin-young | (Chinese Taipei) Chan Chin-wei (Hong Kong) Tong Ka-po | 3–6, 6–3, 1–6 |
| Win | 24. | 22 July 2002 | Incheon, South Korea | Hard | (South Korea) Kim Mi-ok | (South Korea) Kim Eun-sook (South Korea) Cho Eun-hye | 6–2, 6–4 |
