= Tong Ka-po =

Hong Kong tennis player

- Country (sports): Hong Kong
- Born: 17 March 1981 (age 45) Hong Kong
- Prize money: $44,746

Singles
- Career record: 131–90
- Career titles: 3 ITF
- Highest ranking: No. 236 (20 August 2001)

Doubles
- Career record: 72–71
- Career titles: 6 ITF
- Highest ranking: No. 154 (28 May 2001)

Team competitions
- Fed Cup: 23–20

Tong Ka-po (Chinese: 湯嘉寶, born 17 March 1981) is a female tennis coach and former professional tennis player from Hong Kong.

== Career ==
On 17 March 1981, Tong was born in Hong Kong.

By age 12, she was ranked number one in Hong Kong and ranked fifth in the world.

Tong featured in 32 ties for the Hong Kong Fed Cup team and represented her nation twice at the Asian Games.

As a singles player on the professional tour, Tong reached a best ranking of 236 and won three singles titles on the ITF Women's Circuit.

All of her main-draw appearances on the WTA Tour came in doubles, including quarterfinal appearances at the 2000 China Open and the 2001 Qatar Open. She had a career-high WTA doubles ranking of 154 and took part in the women's doubles qualifying draw at the 2001 Wimbledon Championships.

Tong now is a tennis coach and director at Modern Tennis Academy in Hong Kong.

== ITF finals ==
=== Singles (3–0) ===
Legend
$50,000 tournaments
$25,000 tournaments
$10,000 tournaments

Result	No.	Date	Tournament	Surface	Opponent	Score
Win	1.	29 November 1998	Manila, Philippines	Hard	(South Africa) Lara van Rooyen	6–3, 6–1
Win	2.	3 September 2000	Kugayama, Japan	Hard	(South Korea) Chang Kyung-mi	7–6^{(3)}, 7–5
Win	3.	2 June 2002	Tianjin, China	Hard (i)	(China) Liu Weijuan	6–3, 6–4

=== Doubles (6–2) ===
Result	No.	Date	Tournament	Surface	Partner	Opponents	Score
Win	1.	20 December 1999	Lucknow, India	Grass	(India) Manisha Malhotra	(Slovenia) Maša Vesenjak (Slovenia) Urška Vesenjak	6–3, 5–7, 6–1
Loss	2.	6 February 2000	Wellington, New Zealand	Hard	(Australia) Jenny Belobrajdic	(Australia) Mireille Dittmann (Australia) Kristen van Elden	6–7^{(6)}, 4–6
Loss	3.	16 July 2000	Winnipeg, Canada	Clay	(Germany) Kirstin Freye	(Canada) Renata Kolbovic (Canada) Vanessa Webb	1–6, 4–6
Win	4.	6 August 2000	Alghero, Italy	Clay	(Japan) Ayami Takase	(Italy) Alice Canepa (Italy) Valentina Sassi	3–6, 6–3, 6–1
Win	5.	14 August 2000	Istanbul, Turkey	Hard	(Romania) Magda Mihalache	(Russia) Maria Goloviznina (Russia) Evgenia Kulikovskaya	6–1, 6–2
Win	6.	3 September 2000	Kugayama, Japan	Hard	(Chinese Taipei) Chen Yu-an	(South Korea) Chang Kyung-mi (South Korea) Chae Kyung-yee	6–3, 6–1
Win	7.	29 July 2001	Guangzhou, China	Hard	(China) Li Ting	(China) Chen Yan (China) Sun Tiantian	7–5, 6–3
Win	8.	2 June 2002	Tianjin, China	Hard (i)	(Chinese Taipei) Chan Chin-wei	(South Korea) Choi Jin-young (South Korea) Choi Young-ja	6–3, 3–6, 6–1
