= Chang Kyung-mi =

South Korean tennis player

- Country (sports): South Korea
- Born: 25 February 1982 (age 43)
- Prize money: $96,372

Singles
- Career record: 229–160
- Career titles: 5 ITF
- Highest ranking: No. 254 (29 January 2001)

Doubles
- Career record: 203–117
- Career titles: 20 ITF
- Highest ranking: No. 195 (5 July 2004)

Team competitions
- Fed Cup: 7–8

Chang Kyung-mi (born 25 February 1982) is a former professional tennis player from South Korea.

== Biography ==
Chang represented South Korea between 2004 and 2009, appearing in a total of 15 Fed Cup ties with a win–loss record of 7–8.

On the professional tour, she reached a best singles ranking of 254 in the world. She competed in the singles main draw of the Japan Open as a qualifier in 2002 and Korea Open as a wildcard player in 2005.

As a doubles player, Chang had a top WTA ranking of 195 and won 20 ITF titles.

== ITF Circuit finals ==
Legend
$25,000 tournaments
$15,000 tournaments

=== Singles: 17 (5–12) ===
Outcome	No.	Date	Tournament	Surface	Opponent	Score
Runner-up	1.	2 July 2000	ITF Springfield, United States	Hard	(United States) Adria Engel	2–6, 3–6
Runner-up	2.	9 July 2000	ITF Edmond, United States	Hard	(United States) Abigail Spears	6–1, 4–6, 3–6
Winner	3.	23 July 2000	ITF Vancouver, Canada	Hard	(Canada) Alison Nash	6–1, 2–6, 6–0
Runner-up	4.	3 September 2000	ITF Kugayama, Japan	Hard	(Hong Kong) Tong Ka-po	6–7^{(3)}, 5–7
Runner-up	5.	10 September 2000	ITF Ibaraki, Japan	Hard	(Japan) Shiho Hisamatsu	5–7, 7–6^{(3)}, 2–6
Runner-up	6.	17 September 2000	ITF Osaka, Japan	Hard	(South Korea) Jeon Mi-ra	6–7^{(4)}, 1–6
Winner	7.	24 September 2000	ITF Kyoto, Japan	Carpet (i)	(Japan) Shiho Hisamatsu	6–2, 5–7, 6–2
Runner-up	8.	7 July 2002	ITF Waco, United States	Hard	(United States) Milangela Morales	6–2, 1–6, 3–6
Winner	9.	21 July 2002	ITF Seoul, South Korea	Hard	(South Korea) Chae Kyung-yee	4–6, 6–3, 6–1
Runner-up	10.	29 June 2003	ITF Edmond, United States	Hard	(United States) Kelly McCain	5–7, 2–6
Runner-up	11.	27 July 2003	ITF Changwon, South Korea	Hard	(South Korea) Kim Jin-hee	w/o
Runner-up	12.	8 September 2003	ITF Saitama, Japan	Hard	(Japan) Mayumi Yamamoto	2–6, 0–6
Runner-up	13.	15 September 2003	ITF Kyoto, Japan	Carpet (i)	(Japan) Chisayo Ito	3–6, 5–7
Winner	14.	13 February 2005	ITF Blenheim, New Zealand	Hard	(Australia) Mireille Dittmann	5–7, 6–3, 7–6^{(2)}
Runner-up	15.	3 June 2007	ITF Gimhae, South Korea	Clay	(South Korea) Lee Jin-a	3–6, 3–6
Winner	16.	24 August 2008	ITF Gimhae, South Korea	Clay	(South Korea) Kim Sun-jung	6–4, 6–2
Runner-up	17.	28 June 2009	ITF Gimcheon, South Korea	Hard	(South Korea) Kim Na-ri	4–6, 7–6^{(5)}, 2–6

=== Doubles: 39 (20–19) ===
Outcome	No.	Date	Tournament	Surface	Partner	Opponent	Score
Winner	1.	29 November 1998	ITF Manila, Philippines	Hard	(South Korea) Kim Jin-hee	(Indonesia) Liza Andriyani (Indonesia) Irawati Iskandar	6–3, 7–6
Runner-up	2.	4 April 1999	ITF Incheon, South Korea	Clay	(South Korea) Kim Jin-hee	(South Korea) Lee Eun-jeong (South Korea) Park Seon-young	3–6, 2–6
Runner-up	3.	6 June 1999	ITF Little Rock, United States	Hard	(South Korea) Chae Kyung-yee	(Japan) Seiko Okamoto (Japan) Keiko Taguchi	5–7, 2–6
Runner-up	4.	23 April 2000	ITF Dalian, China	Hard	(Japan) Satoko Kurioka	(China) Ding Ding (China) Li Na	5–7, 3–6
Winner	5.	11 June 2000	ITF Incheon, South Korea	Hard	(South Korea) Chae Kyung-yee	(South Korea) Chung Yang-jin (South Korea) Lee Eun-jeong	6–3, 4–6, 7–5
Runner-up	6.	18 June 2000	ITF Seoul, South Korea	Hard	(South Korea) Chae Kyung-yee	(South Korea) Choi Young-ja (South Korea) Kim Eun-sook	0–6, 0–6
Winner	7.	9 July 2000	ITF Edmond, United States	Hard	(Malaysia) Khoo Chin-bee	(United States) Jacqueline Trail (Australia) Cindy Watson	6–4, 6–4
Runner-up	8.	30 July 2000	ITF Vancouver, Canada	Hard	(Germany) Antonia Matic	(United States) Annica Cooper (United States) Brandi Freudenberg	4–6, 2–6
Runner-up	9.	3 September 2000	ITF Kugayama, Japan	Hard	(South Korea) Chae Kyung-yee	(Chinese Taipei) Chen Yu-an (Hong Kong) Tong Ka-po	3–6, 1–6
Runner-up	10.	10 September 2000	ITF Ibaraki, Japan	Hard	(South Korea) Chae Kyung-yee	(Japan) Shiho Hisamatsu (South Korea) Jeon Mi-ra	3–6, 3–6
Runner-up	11.	24 September 2000	ITF Kyoto, Japan	Hard	(South Korea) Chae Kyung-yee	(Japan) Shiho Hisamatsu (South Korea) Jeon Mi-ra	6–7^{(4)}, 5–7
Runner-up	12.	21 July 2002	ITF Seoul, South Korea	Hard	(South Korea) Chae Kyung-yee	(Japan) Maki Arai (Japan) Seiko Okamoto	3–6, 7–5, 4–6
Winner	13.	25 August 2003	ITF Saitama, Japan	Hard	(Japan) Ryoko Takemura	(Chinese Taipei) Hsieh Su-wei (Japan) Mari Inoue	6–2, 6–2
Runner-up	14.	1 September 2003	ITF Saitama, Japan	Hard	(Japan) Ryoko Takemura	(Japan) Shizu Katsumi (Japan) Keiko Taguchi	6–1, 6–7^{(3)}, 2–6
Winner	15.	15 September 2003	ITF Kyoto, Japan	Carpet (i)	(Japan) Ryoko Takemura	(Chinese Taipei) Hsieh Su-wei (Japan) Mari Inoue	7–5, 7–5
Winner	16.	6 June 2004	ITF Changwon, South Korea	Hard	(South Korea) Kim Jin-hee	(Japan) Ayami Takase (Japan) Tomoko Yonemura	7–5, 6–4
Runner-up	17.	13 December 2004	ITF Jakarta, Indonesia	Hard	(South Korea) Lee Ye-ra	(South Korea) Yoo Mi (Russia) Julia Efremova	3–6, 3–6
Winner	18.	5 February 2005	ITF Wellington, New Zealand	Hard	(Japan) Maki Arai	(Australia) Beti Sekulovski (Sweden) Aleksandra Srndovic	3–6, 6–4, 6–4
Winner	19.	13 February 2005	ITF Blenheim, New Zealand	Hard	(Japan) Maki Arai	(Australia) Beti Sekulovski (Sweden) Aleksandra Srndovic	6–4, 7–6
Runner-up	20.	17 July 2005	ITF Seogwipo, South Korea	Hard	(South Korea) Kim Mi-ok	(South Korea) Yoo Mi (South Korea) Chae Kyung-yee	2–6, 1–6
Runner-up	21.	21 May 2006	ITF Daegu, South Korea	Hard	(South Korea) Kim Mi-ok	(South Korea) Yoo Mi (South Korea) Lee Jin-a	6–4, 4–6, 2–6
Winner	22.	25 June 2006	ITF Changwon, South Korea	Hard	(South Korea) Kim Mi-ok	(China) Chen Yanchong (China) Liu Wanting	7–5, 6–1
Winner	23.	27 May 2007	ITF Gimhae, South Korea	Clay	(South Korea) Lee Jin-a	(Japan) Yuka Kuroda (Japan) Eriko Mizuno	6–1, 6–4
Winner	24.	3 June 2007	ITF Gimhae, South Korea	Clay	(South Korea) Lee Jin-a	(South Korea) Kim Sun-jung (South Korea) Lee Cho-won	6–4, 6–1
Runner-up	25.	7 July 2007	ITF Nagoya, Japan	Hard	(South Korea) Kim Jin-hee	(Japan) Junri Namigata (Japan) Akiko Yonemura	2–6, 6–3, 4–6
Winner	26.	4 November 2007	ITF Kofu, Japan	Hard	(Japan) Maki Arai	(Japan) Ayaka Maekawa (Thailand) Varatchaya Wongteanchai	5–7, 6–2, [10–7]
Runner-up	27.	27 April 2008	ITF Incheon, South Korea	Hard	(South Korea) Lee Jin-a	(Chinese Taipei) Chan Chin-wei (Australia) Jarmila Gajdošová	6–1, 1–6, [5–10]
Winner	28.	11 May 2008	ITF Changwon, South Korea	Hard	(South Korea) Lee Jin-a	(South Korea) Cho Yoon-jeong (South Korea) Kim Jin-hee	7–5, 6–2
Winner	29.	13 July 2008	ITF Tokyo, Japan	Carpet	(South Korea) Chae Kyung-yee	(Japan) Ayumi Oka (Thailand) Varatchaya Wongteanchai	3–6, 6–2, [10–7]
Winner	30.	6 September 2008	ITF Go Yang, South Korea	Hard	(South Korea) Chae Kyung-yee	(South Korea) Kim So-jung (Japan) Ayaka Maekawa	7–5, 3–6, [10–5]
Winner	31.	13 September 2008	ITF Go Yang, South Korea	Hard	(South Korea) Chae Kyung-yee	(South Korea) Cho Jeong-a (South Korea) Kim Ji-young	6–3, 4–6, [10–8]
Runner-up	32.	3 May 2009	ITF Gimcheon, South Korea	Hard	(South Korea) Lee Jin-a	(Chinese Taipei) Chang Kai-chen (Chinese Taipei) Chen Yi	1–6, 5–7
Winner	33.	4 July 2009	ITF Gimcheon, South Korea	Hard	(South Korea) Lee Jin-a	(South Korea) Kim Kun-hee (South Korea) Yu Min-hwa	6–1, 6–2
Winner	34.	17 April 2010	ITF Gimhae, South Korea	Hard	(South Korea) Lee Jin-a	(Japan) Misaki Doi (Japan) Junri Namigata	1–6, 6–4, [10–8]
Winner	35.	24 April 2010	ITF Changwon, South Korea	Hard	(South Korea) Lee Jin-a	(Japan) Misaki Doi (Japan) Junri Namigata	5–7, 6–3, [10–8]
Winner	36.	1 May 2010	ITF Gimcheon, South Korea	Hard	(South Korea) Lee Jin-a	(South Korea) Kim Kun-hee (South Korea) Yu Min-hwa	7–5, 6–3
Runner-up	37.	17 May 2010	ITF Sunchang, South Korea	Hard	(South Korea) Lee Ye-ra	(South Korea) Kim Kun-hee (South Korea) Yu Min-hwa	7–6, 4–6, 4–6
Runner-up	38.	29 May 2010	ITF Goyang, South Korea	Hard	(South Korea) Lee Jin-a	(South Korea) Kim Kun-hee (South Korea) Yu Min-hwa	4–6, 4–6
Runner-up	39.	13 June 2010	ITF Tokyo, Japan	Hard	(South Korea) Yoo Mi	(Japan) Shuko Aoyama (Japan) Akari Inoue	6–7^{(3)}, 0–6
