= Cho Yoon-jeong =

South Korean tennis player (born 1979)

- Country (sports): South Korea
- Residence: Seoul, Korea
- Born: 2 April 1979 (age 47) Andong, Korea
- Height: 1.67 m (5 ft 6 in)
- Turned pro: 1996
- Retired: 2008
- Plays: Right (two-handed backhand)
- Prize money: $603,590

Singles
- Career record: 255–180
- Career titles: 5 ITF
- Highest ranking: No. 45 (14 July 2003)

Grand Slam singles results
- Australian Open: 2R (2003)
- French Open: 1R (2002, 2003, 2005)
- Wimbledon: 2R (2003, 2005)
- US Open: 3R (2002, 2005)

Doubles
- Career record: 116–84
- Career titles: 1 WTA, 10 ITF
- Highest ranking: No. 98 (22 September 2003)

Grand Slam doubles results
- Australian Open: 1R (1999, 2006)
- French Open: 1R (2005)
- Wimbledon: 1R (1998, 2004)
- US Open: 2R (2003)

Cho Yoon-jeong (Korean: 조윤정, born 2 April 1979) is a South Korean former tennis player.

In her career, she won one doubles title on the WTA Tour, at Seoul in 2004. Her best Grand Slam performance came when she made the third round of the 2005 US Open by defeating Arantxa Parra Santonja in three sets in the first round, and upsetting the 27th seed Gisela Dulko in the second, before she fell to No. 7, Justine Henin. She reached career-high WTA rankings of No. 45 in singles (in July 2003), and No. 98 in doubles (September 2003).

Yoon-jeong retired from professional tennis in 2008.

== Grand Slam tournaments Performance timeline ==
Key
W	F	SF	QF	#R	RR	Q#	DNQ	A	NH

(W) winner; (F) finalist; (SF) semifinalist; (QF) quarterfinalist; (#R) rounds 4, 3, 2, 1; (RR) round-robin stage; (Q#) qualification round; (DNQ) did not qualify; (A) absent; (NH) not held; (SR) strike rate (events won / competed); (W–L) win–loss record.

=== Singles ===
Tournament	1999	2000	2001	2002	2003	2004	2005	2006	2007	W–L
Grand Slam tournaments
Australian Open	Q1	Q1	Q1	1R	2R	A				1–2
French Open			Q1	1R	1R	A	1R			0–3
Wimbledon		Q2	Q2	Q3	2R	Q2	2R			2–2
US Open			1R	3R	1R	A	3R	A	1R	4–5
Win–loss			0–1	2–3	2–4	0–0	3–3		0–1	7–12

== WTA Tour finals ==
=== Singles: 3 (3 runner-ups) ===
Legend
Tier I (0–0)
Tier II (0–0)
Tier III (0–0)
Tier IV & V (0–3)

Result	Date	Tournament	Surface	Opponent	Score
Loss	Nov 2002	Pattaya Open, Thailand	Hard	(Indonesia) Angelique Widjaja	2–6, 4–6
Loss	Jan 2003	Auckland Open, New Zealand	Hard	(Greece) Eleni Daniilidou	4–6, 6–4, 6–7^{(2–7)}
Loss	Jan 2006	Canberra International, Australia	Hard	(Spain) Anabel Medina Garrigues	4–6, 6–0, 4–6

=== Doubles: 2 (1 title, 1 runner-up) ===
Result	Date	Tournament	Surface	Partner	Opponents	Score
Loss	Jul 2003	Stanford Classic, United States	Hard	(Italy) Francesca Schiavone	(Zimbabwe) Cara Black (United States) Lisa Raymond	6–7^{(5–7)}, 1–6
Win	Oct 2004	Seoul Open, South Korea	Hard	(South Korea) Jeon Mi-ra	(Chinese Taipei) Chuang Chia-jung (Chinese Taipei) Hsieh Su-wei	6–3, 1–6, 7–5

== ITF Circuit finals ==
=== Singles: 13 (5–8) ===
Legend
$100,000 tournaments
$75,000 tournaments
$50,000 tournaments
$25,000 tournaments
$10,000 tournaments

Outcome	No.	Date	Tournament	Surface	Opponent	Score
Runner-up	1.	31 March 1996	ITF Jakarta, Indonesia	Hard	(South Korea) Choi Young-ja	2–6, 1–6
Winner	2.	6 April 1997	ITF Jakarta	Hard	(South Korea) Choi Young-ja	6–4, 6–1
Runner-up	3.	13 April 1997	ITF Jakarta	Hard	(South Korea) Choi Young-ja	1–6, 5–7
Winner	4.	18 February 2001	ITF Midland, United States	Hard	(United States) Tara Snyder	6–3, 6–1
Runner-up	5.	18 February 2001	ITF Seoul, South Korea	Hard	(Japan) Miho Saeki	3–6, 0–6
Runner-up	6.	25 November 2001	ITF Nuriootpa, Australia	Hard	(Japan) Saori Obata	4–6, 1–6
Winner	7.	21 July 2002	ITF Oyster Bay, United States	Hard	(Kazakhstan) Irina Selyutina	7–6^{(5)}, 6–4
Winner	8.	24 November 2002	ITF Nuriootpa	Hard	(Australia) Alicia Molik	6–4, 6–1
Runner-up	9.	8 June 2003	ITF Surbiton, United Kingdom	Grass	(Puerto Rico) Kristina Brandi	1–6, 3–6
Runner-up	10.	21 November 2004	ITF Nuriootpa	Hard	(Australia) Evie Dominikovic	4–6, 7–5, 4–6
Runner-up	11.	28 November 2004	ITF Mount Gambier, Australia	Hard	(Australia) Evie Dominikovic	5–7, 3–6
Runner-up	12.	13 February 2005	ITF Midland	Hard	(United States) Laura Granville	3–6, 6–3, 6–7^{(6)}
Winner	13.	20 March 2005	ITF Orange, United States	Hard	(Germany) Julia Schruff	7–6^{(3)}, 6–1

=== Doubles: 16 (10–6) ===
Outcome	No.	Date	Tournament	Surface	Partner	Opponents	Score
Runner-up	1.	13 April 1997	ITF Jakarta, Indonesia	Hard	(South Korea) Won Kyung-joo	(United Kingdom) Jasmine Choudhury (United Kingdom) Lizzie Jelfs	4–6, 6–7
Winner	2.	5 May 1997	ITF Seoul	Clay	(South Korea) Kim Eun-ha	(South Korea) Choi Young-ja (South Korea) Park Sung-hee	6–3, 7–6^{(6)}
Runner-up	3.	3 May 1998	ITF Gifu, Japan	Grass	(South Korea) Park Sung-hee	(Australia) Catherine Barclay (Australia) Kerry-Anne Guse	6–7^{(3)}, 4–6
Winner	4.	10 May 1998	ITF Seoul	Clay	(South Korea) Park Sung-hee	(China) Ding Ding (China) Li Ting	6–1, 3–6, 6–2
Winner	5.	21 March 1999	ITF Noda, Japan	Hard	(South Korea) Park Sung-hee	(Japan) Shinobu Asagoe (Japan) Yuka Yoshida	6–3, 6–3
Winner	6.	2 May 1999	ITF Gifu	Carpet	(South Korea) Chae Kyung-yee	(Japan) Shiho Hisamatsu (Japan) Nana Miyagi	6–2, 4–6, 6–2
Runner-up	7.	24 May 1999	ITF Warsaw, Poland	Clay	(South Korea) Park Sung-hee	(Romania) Magda Mihalache (Croatia) Jelena Kostanić Tošić	1–6, 3–6
Winner	8.	31 January 2000	ITF Clearwater, United States	Hard	(China) Yi Jing-Qian	(United States) Sandra Cacic (United States) Lindsay Lee-Waters	6–4, 7–6^{(7)}
Winner	9.	28 May 2000	ITF Ho Chi Minh City, Vietnam	Hard	(Japan) Saori Obata	(China) Li Na (China) Li Ting	6–1, 6–2
Runner-up	10.	28 October 2000	ITF Seoul	Hard	(South Korea) Jeon Mi-ra	(South Africa) Surina De Beer (Germany) Marlene Weingärtner	2–4, 1–4, 4–1
Winner	11.	1 May 2002	ITF Gifu	Grass	(Australia) Evie Dominikovic	(Japan) Shinobu Asagoe (Japan) Rika Fujiwara	6–2, 6–2
Winner	12.	12 May 2002	ITF Fukuoka, Japan	Hard	(Japan) Shinobu Asagoe	(United Kingdom) Julie Pullin (United Kingdom) Lorna Woodroffe	6–2, 6–4
Winner	13.	2 May 2004	ITF Gifu	Carpet	(South Korea) Jeon Mi-ra	(Chinese Taipei) Chuang Chia-jung (Indonesia) Wynne Prakusya	7–6^{(4)}, 6–2
Winner	14.	15 November 2004	ITF Nuriootpa	Hard	(South Korea) Kim Jin-hee	(Australia) Evie Dominikovic (Australia) Daniella Jeflea	7–5, 6–2
Runner-up	15.	4 May 2008	ITF Gimcheon, South Korea	Hard	(South Korea) Kim Jin-hee	(Chinese Taipei) Chan Chin-wei (Australia) Jarmila Gajdošová	2–6, 0–6
Runner-up	16.	11 May 2008	ITF Changwon, South Korea	Hard	(South Korea) Kim Jin-hee	(South Korea) Chang Kyung-mi (South Korea) Lee Jin-a	5–7, 2–6
