= Tennis at the 2001 Summer Universiade =

Tennis events at the 2001 Summer Universiade were held at the Muxiyuan Tennis Center in Beijing, China.

== Medal summary ==
Event	Gold	Silver	Bronze
Men's Singles	Lee Seung-hoon (KOR)	Philipp Mukhometov (RUS)	Matthieu Amgwerd (SUI)
Men's Singles	Lee Seung-hoon (KOR)	Philipp Mukhometov (RUS)	Lu Yen-hsun (TPE)
Men's Doubles	Juan Carlos Arredondo and Carlos Alberto Lozano (MEX)	Pavel Kudrnáč and Tomáš Macharáček (CZE)	Li Si and Yang Jingzhu (CHN)
Men's Doubles	Juan Carlos Arredondo and Carlos Alberto Lozano (MEX)	Pavel Kudrnáč and Tomáš Macharáček (CZE)	Kim Dong-hyun and Lee Seung-hoon (KOR)
Women's Singles	Li Na (CHN)	Janet Lee (TPE)	Chung Yang-jin (KOR)
Women's Singles	Li Na (CHN)	Janet Lee (TPE)	Amanda Janes (GBR)
Women's Doubles	Li Na and Li Ting (CHN)	Kim Eun-ha and Kim Mi-ok (KOR)	Julie Coin and Emilie Scribot (FRA)
Women's Doubles	Li Na and Li Ting (CHN)	Kim Eun-ha and Kim Mi-ok (KOR)	Janet Lee and Weng Tzu-ting (TPE)
Mixed Doubles	Li Na and Zhu Benqiang (CHN)	Susi Bensch and Jan Boruszewski (GER)	Linda Faltynková and Tomáš Macharek (CZE)
Mixed Doubles	Li Na and Zhu Benqiang (CHN)	Susi Bensch and Jan Boruszewski (GER)	Kim Eun-ha and Kim Dong-hyun (KOR)

== Medal table ==
Rank	Nation	Gold	Silver	Bronze	Total
1	China (CHN)	3	0	1	4
2	South Korea (KOR)	1	1	3	5
3	Mexico (MEX)	1	0	0	1
4	Chinese Taipei (TPE)	0	1	2	3
5	Czech Republic (CZE)	0	1	1	2
6	Germany (GER)	0	1	0	1
6	Russia (RUS)	0	1	0	1
8	France (FRA)	0	0	1	1
8	Great Britain (GBR)	0	0	1	1
8	Switzerland (SUI)	0	0	1	1
Totals (10 entries)		5	5	10	20

== See also ==
- Tennis at the Summer Universiade
