= Chung Yang-jin =

South Korean tennis player

- Country (sports): South Korea
- Born: 6 November 1978 (age 46) Jochiwon, South Korea
- Retired: 2002
- Plays: Right-handed
- Prize money: $20,597

Singles
- Career record: 62-28
- Career titles: 0 WTA / 2 ITF
- Highest ranking: No. 362 (12 July 1999)

Doubles
- Career record: 26-20
- Career titles: 0 WTA / 1 ITF
- Highest ranking: No. 457 (26 June 2000)
Medal record
Universiade
Bronze medal – third place	2001 Beijing	Women's Singles
Asian Games
Bronze medal – third place	2002 Busan	Women's Team

Chung Yang-jin (born 6 November 1978) is a South Korean former professional tennis player.

== Biography ==
A right-handed player born in Jochiwon, Chung reached a best singles ranking on the professional tour of 362 in the world and featured in a total of 15 Fed Cup ties for South Korea.

In 2000 she won ITF titles in Jakarta and Seoul.

Chung was a singles bronze medalist for South Korea at the 2001 Summer Universiade in Beijing.

At the 2002 Asian Games in Busan, Chung was a member of the bronze medal winning South Korean team.

== ITF Finals ==
$10,000 tournaments

=== Singles (2–5) ===
Outcome	No.	Date	Tournament	Surface	Opponent	Score
Runner-up	1.	4 April 1999	Inchon, South Korea	Clay	(South Korea) Choi Jin-young	7–6, 2–6, 1–6
Runner-up	2.	13 June 1999	Shenzhen, China	Hard	(China) Li Na	2–6, 3–6
Runner-up	3.	20 June 1999	Shenzhen, China	Hard	(China) Li Na	0–6, 0–6
Winner	4.	2 February 2000	Jakarta, Indonesia	Hard	(South Africa) Lara van Rooyen	7-6, 7-5
Runner-up	5.	11 June 2000	Incheon, South Korea	Hard	(South Korea) Choi Young-ja	1-6, 2-6
Winner	6.	18 June 2000	Seoul, South Korea	Hard	(South Korea) Lee Eun-jeong	6-4, 6-2
Runner-up	7.	24 June 2001	Incheon, South Korea	Hard	(China) Sun Tiantian	4-6, 3-6

=== Doubles (1–3) ===
Outcome	No.	Date	Tournament	Surface	Partnering	Opponents	Score
Winner	1.	31 August 1997	Nonthaburi, Thailand	Hard	(South Korea) Kim Eun-kyung	(Thailand) Sawitre Naree (Thailand) Orawan Wongkamalasai	6-2, 6-2
Runner-up	2.	21 June 1999	Shenzhen, China	Hard	(South Korea) Lee Eun-jeong	(China) Li Na (China) Li Ting	3–6, 1–6
Runner-up	3.	11 June 2000	Inchon, South Korea	Hard	(South Korea) Lee Eun-jeong	(South Korea) Chang Kyung-mi (South Korea) Chae Kyung-yee	3–6, 6–4, 5–7
Runner-up	4.	17 June 2001	Seoul, South Korea	Hard	(South Korea) Lee Eun-jeong	(South Korea) Choi Jin-young (South Korea) Kim Mi-ok	0–6, 1–6
