= Junri Namigata =

Japanese tennis player (born 1982)

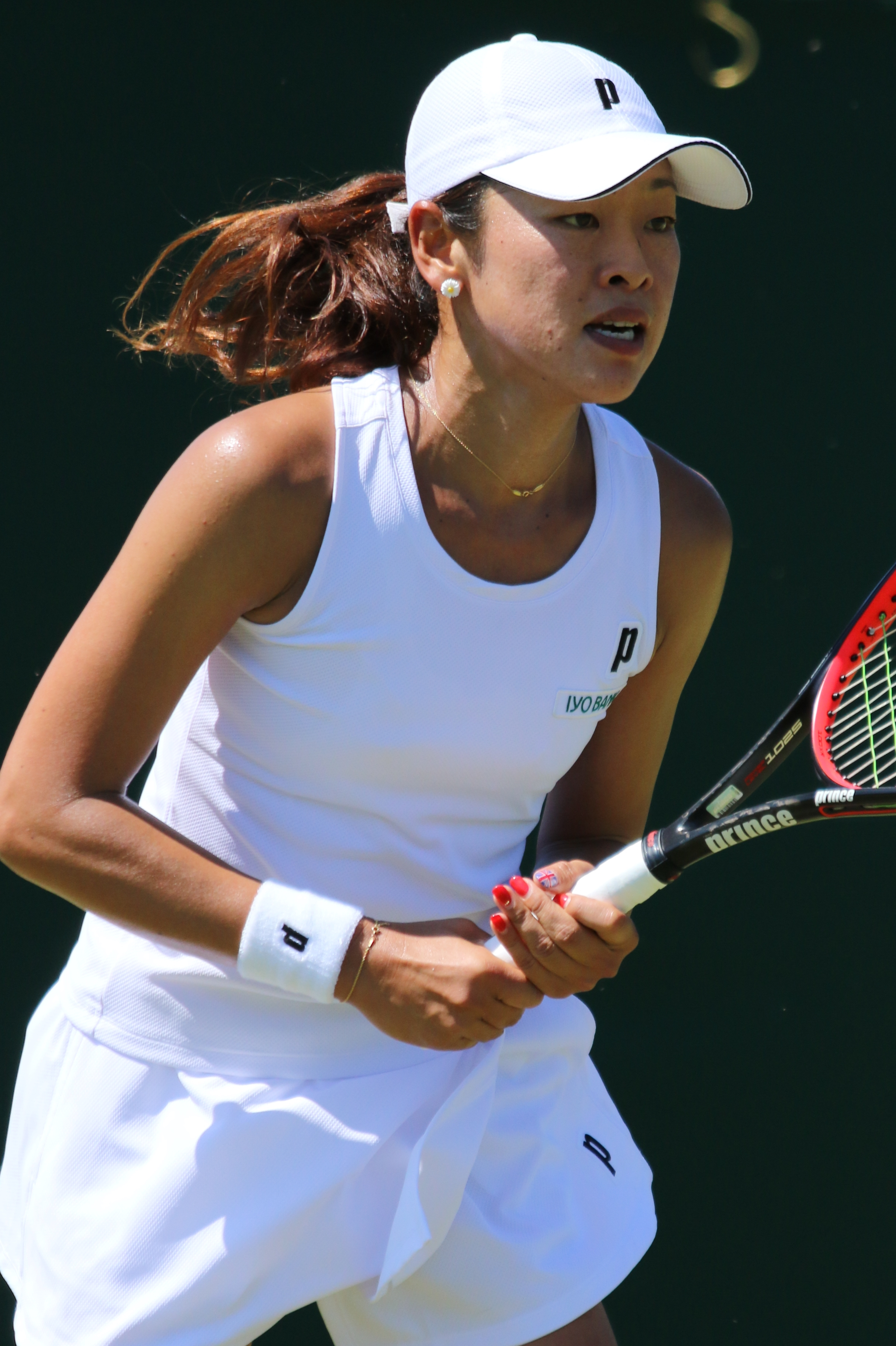
- Namigata at the 2018 Wimbledon Championships
- Native name: 波形純理
- Country (sports): Japan
- Residence: Saitama, Japan
- Born: 5 July 1982 (age 44) Koshigaya, Japan
- Height: 1.70 m (5 ft 7 in)
- Turned pro: 2005
- Plays: Right (two-handed backhand)
- College: Waseda University
- Coach: Toshihisa Tsuchihashi
- Prize money: US$ 639,251

Singles
- Career record: 495–411
- Career titles: 7 ITF
- Highest ranking: No. 105 (28 February 2011)

Grand Slam singles results
- Australian Open: 1R (2011)
- French Open: 1R (2011)
- Wimbledon: Q3 (2010, 2011)
- US Open: Q3 (2006, 2010)

Doubles
- Career record: 336–231
- Career titles: 1 WTA Challenger, 25 ITF
- Highest ranking: No. 101 (25 May 2015)

Grand Slam doubles results
- Australian Open: 1R (2017)
- Wimbledon: 1R (2008)

Team competitions
- Fed Cup: 5–0

Junri Namigata (波形 純理, Namigata Junri; born 5 July 1982) is a Japanese tennis player. Her career-high WTA singles ranking is 105, which she reached in February 2011. Her career-high doubles ranking is 101, achieved May 2015.

== Early life and amateur career ==
Namigata was born in Koshigaya, Saitama Prefecture and started playing tennis when she was six years old. She completed elementary school at a school in Koshigaya and won a regional tournament when in the third grade. She attended Fujimura Girls' Junior High School and Horikoshi High School in Tokyo. In September 1997, when still in junior high school, she made her first appearance in an ITF doubles tournament. In her first year of high school, she reached the round of 16 at the All Japan Tennis Championship and won the All Japan Junior Championship title in her final year of high school. She enrolled in the School of Social Sciences at Waseda University and in 2001 won the intercollegiate doubles title, was runner-up in the singles title, and was a member of the Waseda team that took out the team event. In 2004, she won the intercollegiate singles title and also won her first ITF doubles titles in October.

== Professional career ==
Namigata turned professional in August 2005, after graduating from Waseda in April of the same year. Her goal was to finish her first year as a professional ranked in the top 200; she finished 2006 ranked 162 in singles. The first of her six singles titles came in July 2007.

In July 2014, Namigata won her first WTA event, the doubles tournament of the inaugural Jiangxi International Open, partnering with Chuang Chia-jung. 2014 was the most successful year of her career thus far, winning three doubles titles and her first singles title on the ITF Circuit since 2010. She finished the year ranked 196 in singles and 145 in doubles, returning to the top 200 in each category for the first time since 2011.

=== Grand Slam appearances ===
In singles, Namigata has qualified for two major tournaments. At the 2011 Australian Open, she lost to Canadian Rebecca Marino in the first round. Later in the year, at the French Open, she lost in the first round to Aleksandra Wozniak.

In doubles, she qualified for the 2008 Wimbledon Championships with fellow Japanese player Ayumi Morita, losing in the first round to Ekaterina Makarova and Selima Sfar.

In 2017, Namigata and Chan Chin-wei received wildcard entry into the Australian Open, losing in the first round to Tatjana Maria and Pauline Parmentier.

=== Fed Cup ===
Namigata represented Japan in the Asia/Oceania group of the 2011 Fed Cup.

== WTA Tour finals ==
=== Doubles: 1 (runner–up) ===
Legend
Grand Slam
WTA 1000
WTA 500
WTA 250 (0–1)

Result	W–L	Date	Tournament	Tier	Surface	Partner	Opponents	Score
Loss	0–1	Oct 2007	Bangkok Open, Thailand	Tier III (Note: The WTA Tier III tournaments, WTA Tier IV tournaments and WTA Tier V tournaments were reclassified as WTA International tournaments in 2009 and later as WTA 250 tournaments in 2021.)	Hard	(Japan) Ayumi Morita	(China) Sun Tiantian (China) Yan Zi	w/o

== WTA Challenger finals ==
=== Doubles: 1 (title) ===
Result	W–L	Date	Tournament	Surface	Partner	Opponents	Score
Win	1–0	Jul 2014	Jiangxi International, China	Hard	(Chinese Taipei) Chuang Chia-jung	(Chinese Taipei) Chan Chin-wei (China) Xu Yifan	7–6^{(7–4)}, 6–3

== ITF Circuit finals ==
=== Singles: 23 (7 titles, 16 runner–ups) ===
Legend
$75,000 tournaments
$50,000 tournaments
$25,000 tournaments
$10,000 tournaments

Result	W–L	Date	Tournament	Tier	Surface	Opponent	Score
Loss	0–1	Jul 2004	ITF Inchon, South Korea	10,000	Hard	(South Korea) Lee Eun-jeong	0–6, 6–3, 0–6
Loss	0–2	May 2006	ITF Ho Chi Minh City, Vietnam	25,000	Hard	(Slovakia) Katarína Kachlíková	4–6, 4–6
Win	1–2	Jul 2007	ITF Miyazaki, Japan	25,000	Carpet	(China) Zhang Shuai	6–4, 6–2
Loss	1–3	Oct 2007	ITF Hamanako, Japan	25,000	Carpet	(Belgium) Yanina Wickmayer	6–4, 4–6, 2–6
Loss	1–4	Apr 2009	ITF Changwon, South Korea	25,000	Hard	(United Kingdom) Elena Baltacha	3–6, 1–6
Win	2–4	May 2009	ITF Gunma, Japan	25,000	Carpet	(Chinese Taipei) Hsu Wen-hsin	6–1, 6–1
Win	3–4	Jul 2009	ITF Miyazaki, Japan	10,000	Carpet	(Japan) Shiho Akita	7–6^{(6)}, 6–2
Loss	3–5	Aug 2009	ITF Obihiro, Japan	25,000	Carpet	(Japan) Kurumi Nara	6–7^{(4)}, 6–4, 4–6
Win	4–5	May 2010	Fukuoka International, Japan	50,000	Grass	(Austria) Nikola Hofmanova	6–1, 6–2
Loss	4–6	May 2010	ITF Kusatsu, Japan	25,000	Carpet	(Japan) Akiko Yonemura	4–6, 6–7^{(4)}
Win	5–6	Aug 2010	Beijing Challenger, China	75,000	Hard	(China) Zhang Shuai	7–6^{(3)}, 6–2
Loss	5–6	Nov 2010	Toyota World Challenge, Japan	75,000	Carpet (i)	(Japan) Misaki Doi	7–5, 6–2
Loss	5–8	Oct 2011	ITF Hamanako, Japan	25,000	Carpet	(Czech Republic) Karolína Plíšková	2–6, 6–7^{(4)}
Loss	5–9	May 2012	ITF Karuizawa, Japan	25,000	Grass	(Russia) Marta Sirotkina	4–6, 6–2, 4–6
Loss	5–10	May 2013	ITF Karuizawa, Japan	25,000	Grass	(Japan) Eri Hozumi	6–7^{(5)}, 3–6
Loss	5–11	Jun 2014	ITF Changwon, South Korea	25,000	Hard	(South Korea) Hong Hyun-hui	6–2, 4–6, 3–6
Loss	5–12	Jun 2014	ITF Kashiwa, Japan	10,000	Hard	(Japan) Riko Sawayanagi	4–6, 6–7^{(5)}
Win	6–12	Aug 2014	ITF Tsukuba, Japan	25,000	Hard	(Chinese Taipei) Chang Kai-chen	6–0, 7–6^{(3)}
Loss	6–13	Oct 2014	ITF Hamamatsu, Japan	25,000	Carpet	(Japan) Riko Sawayanagi	6–2, 2–6, 3–6
Loss	6–14	May 2017	ITF Karuizawa, Japan	25,000	Carpet	(Japan) Ayano Shimizu	6–0, 4–6, 4–6
Loss	6–15	Sep 2017	ITF Nanao, Japan	25,000	Carpet	(Canada) Carol Zhao	3–6, 2–6
Loss	6–16	Oct 2018	ITF Makinohara, Japan	25,000	Carpet	(Japan) Momoko Kobori	2–6, 3–6
Win	7–16	Sep 2019	ITF Nanao, Japan	25,000	Carpet	(Japan) Ayano Shimizu	7–6^{(5)}, 4–6, 6–2

=== Doubles: 52 (25 titles, 27 runner–ups) ===
Legend
$100,000 tournaments
$75/80,000 tournaments
$50/60,000 tournaments
$25,000 tournaments
$10/15,000 tournaments

Result	W–L	Date	Tournament	Tier	Surface	Partner	Opponents	Score
Win	1–0	Oct 2004	ITF Tokyo, Japan	10,000	Hard	(Japan) Kumiko Iijima	(Japan) Maki Arai (Japan) Akiko Yonemura	6–3, 6–1
Win	2–0	Jul 2005	ITF Hamilton, Canada	25,000	Clay	(Japan) Kumiko Iijima	(United States) Lauren Barnikow (Australia) Lauren Breadmore	6–7^{(4)}, 6–2, 6–2
Loss	2–1	Jul 2005	Lexington Challenger, United States	50,000	Hard	(Japan) Kumiko Iijima	(Puerto Rico) Vilmarie Castellvi (United States) Samantha Reeves	2–6, 1–6
Loss	2–2	Feb 2006	ITF Sydney, Australia	25,000	Hard	(Japan) Ayumi Morita	(Chinese Taipei) Chan Yung-jan (Chinese Taipei) Chuang Chia-jung	2–6, 1–6
Win	3–2	May 2006	ITF Nagano, Japan	25,000	Carpet	(Japan) Kumiko Iijima	(Japan) Remi Tezuka (Japan) Tomoko Yonemura	6–3, 7–6^{(3)}
Win	4–2	Aug 2006	ITF Tokachi, Japan	25,000	Carpet	(Japan) Kumiko Iijima	(Japan) Shiho Hisamatsu (Japan) Remi Tezuka	7–5, 6–4
Win	5–2	Sep 2006	ITF Ibaraki, Japan	25,000	Hard	(Japan) Kumiko Iijima	(Japan) Natsumi Hamamura (Japan) Ayaka Maekawa	6–7^{(4)}, 6–3, 6–2
Loss	5–3	Apr 2007	ITF Jackson, United States	25,000	Clay	(Japan) Yurika Sema	(Czech Republic) Eva Hrdinová (Czech Republic) Michaela Paštíková	6–7^{(5)}, 6–7^{(3)}
Loss	5–4	May 2007	Fukuoka International, Japan	50,000	Carpet	(Japan) Rika Fujiwara	(Japan) Ayumi Morita (Japan) Akiko Yonemura	2–6, 2–6
Win	6–4	Jul 2007	ITF Nagoya, Japan	25,000	Hard	(Japan) Akiko Yonemura	(South Korea) Chang Kyung-mi (South Korea) Kim Jin-hee	6–2, 3–6, 6–4
Win	7–4	Aug 2007	ITF Obihiro, Japan	25,000	Carpet	(Japan) Kumiko Iijima	(Japan) Ayumi Morita (Japan) Akiko Yonemura	7–6^{(3)}, 6–0
Win	8–4	Sep 2007	ITF Tokyo, Japan	50,000	Hard	(Japan) Rika Fujiwara	(Japan) Kumiko Iijima (Japan) Akiko Yonemura	3–6, 7–6^{(4)}, [10–5]
Loss	8–5	Aug 2008	Vancouver Open, Canada	50,000	Hard	(United States) Christina Fusano	(United States) Carly Gullickson (Australia) Nicole Kriz	7–6^{(4)}, 1–6, [5–10]
Win	9–5	Oct 2008	ITF Makinohara, Japan	25,000	Carpet	(Japan) Natsumi Hamamura	(South Korea) Chae Kyung-yee (China) Han Xinyun	7–5, 7–6^{(4)}
Loss	9–6	Oct 2008	ITF Hamanako, Japan	25,000	Carpet	(Japan) Akiko Yonemura	(Japan) Kanae Hisami (Japan) Yurina Koshino	5–7, 4–6
Loss	9–7	May 2009	Fukuoka International, Japan	50,000	Grass	(Japan) Ayaka Maekawa	(Japan) Akiko Yonemura (Japan) Tomoko Yonemura	2–6, 7–6^{(3)}, [3–10]
Win	10–7	May 2009	ITF Nagano, Japan	25,000	Carpet	(Japan) Akiko Yonemura	(Japan) Tomoyo Takagishi (Thailand) Varatchaya Wongteanchai	6–1, 6–4
Loss	10–8	Apr 2010	ITF Incheon, South Korea	25,000	Hard	(Japan) Misaki Doi	(Romania) Irina-Camelia Begu (Japan) Erika Sema	0–6, 6–7^{(8)}
Loss	10–9	Apr 2010	ITF Gimhae, South Korea	25,000	Hard	(Japan) Misaki Doi	(South Korea) Chang Kyung-mi (South Korea) Lee Jin-a	6–1, 4–6, [8–10]
Loss	10–10	Apr 2010	ITF Changwon, South Korea	25,000	Hard	(Japan) Misaki Doi	(South Korea) Chang Kyung-mi (South Korea) Lee Jin-a	7–5, 3–6, [8–10]
Loss	10–11	May 2011	Fukuoka International, Japan	50,000	Grass	(Japan) Aiko Nakamura	(Japan) Shuko Aoyama (Japan) Rika Fujiwara	6–7^{(3)}, 0–6
Loss	10–12	Oct 2011	ITF Makinohara, Japan	25,000	Carpet	(Japan) Akiko Yonemura	(Japan) Shuko Aoyama (Japan) Kotomi Takahata	2–6, 5–7
Loss	10–13	Mar 2012	ITF Ipswich, Australia	25,000	Clay	(Japan) Shuko Aoyama	(Australia) Monique Adamczak (Poland) Sandra Zaniewska	5–7, 4–6
Win	11–13	Apr 2012	ITF Bundaberg, Australia	25,000	Clay	(Japan) Shuko Aoyama	(Australia) Sacha Jones (Australia) Sally Peers	6–1, 7–5
Win	12–13	Jul 2012	ITF Middelburg, Netherlands	25,000	Clay	(Japan) Yurika Sema	(Netherlands) Bernice van de Velde (Netherlands) Angelique van der Meet	6–3, 6–1
Loss	12–14	Apr 2013	ITF Wenshan, China	50,000	Hard	(Japan) Rika Fujiwara	(Japan) Miki Miyamura (Thailand) Varatchaya Wongteanchai	5–7, 3–6
Win	13–14	May 2013	Fukuoka International, Japan	50,000	Grass	(Japan) Erika Sema	(Japan) Rika Fujiwara (Japan) Akiko Omae	7–5, 3–6, [10–7]
Win	14–14	Oct 2013	ITF Hamamatsu, Japan	25,000	Grass	(Japan) Shuko Aoyama	(Switzerland) Belinda Bencic (Georgia (country)) Sofia Shapatava	6–4, 6–3
Win	15–14	Mar 2014	ITF Nishitama, Japan	10,000	Hard	(Japan) Akiko Yonemura	(South Korea) Choi Ji-hee (Japan) Akari Inoue	6–2, 6–4
Loss	15–15	May 2014	Kurume Cup, Japan	50,000	Grass	(Japan) Akiko Yonemura	(Australia) Jarmila Gajdošová (Australia) Arina Rodionova	4–6, 2–6
Win	16–15	May 2014	ITF Karuizawa, Japan	25,000	Grass	(Japan) Akiko Yonemura	(Japan) Kanae Hisami (Japan) Chiaki Okadaue	6–2, 7–5
Win	17–15	May 2014	ITF Changwon, Korea	25,000	Hard	(Chinese Taipei) Chuang Chia-jung	(South Korea) Lee Ye-ra (South Korea) Kim So-jung	7–6^{(5)}, 6–0
Loss	17–16	Nov 2014	Toyota World Challenge, Japan	75,000	Carpet (i)	(Japan) Shuko Aoyama	(Japan) Eri Hozumi (Japan) Makoto Ninomiya	3–6, 5–7
Loss	17–17	Feb 2015	Burnie International, Australia	50,000	Hard	(China) Han Xinyun	(United States) Irina Falconi (Croatia) Petra Martić	2–6, 4–6
Win	18–17	Feb 2015	Launceston International, Australia	50,000	Hard	(China) Han Xinyun	(China) Wang Yafan (China) Yang Zhaoxuan	6–4, 3–6, [10–6]
Loss	18–18	Mar 2015	Blossom Cup, China	50,000	Hard	(Japan) Hiroko Kuwata	(Japan) Eri Hozumi (Japan) Makoto Ninomiya	3–6, 7–6^{(2)}, [2–10]
Loss	18–19	May 2015	Fukuoka International, Japan	50,000	Grass	(Japan) Eri Hozumi	(United Kingdom) Naomi Broady (Czech Republic) Kristýna Plíšková	3–6, 4–6
Loss	18–20	May 2015	Kurume Cup, Japan	50,000	Grass	(Japan) Eri Hozumi	(Japan) Makoto Ninomiya (Japan) Riko Sawayanagi	6–7^{(10)}, 3–6
Win	19–20	Feb 2017	ITF Perth, Australia	25,000	Hard	(Japan) Riko Sawayanagi	(Romania) Irina Bara (India) Prarthana Thombare	7–6^{(5)}, 4–6, [11–9]
Win	20–20	Feb 2017	ITF Perth, Australia	25,000	Hard	(Japan) Riko Sawayanagi	(Australia) Tammi Patterson (Australia) Olivia Rogowska	4–6, 7–5, [10–6]
Win	21–20	May 2017	Fukuoka International, Japan	60,000	Carpet	(Japan) Kotomi Takahata	(Japan) Erina Hayashi (Japan) Robu Kajitani	6–0, 6–7^{(3)}, [10–7]
Loss	21–21	Nov 2017	ITF Tokyo Open, Japan	100,000	Hard	(Japan) Eri Hozumi	(Japan) Yuki Naito (Japan) Rika Fujiwara	1–6, 3–6
Win	22–21	Nov 2017	Toyota World Challenge, Japan	60,000	Carpet (i)	(Russia) Ksenia Lykina	(Thailand) Nicha Lertpitaksinchai (Thailand) Peangtarn Plipuech	3–6, 6–3, [10–4]
Loss	22–22	Jan 2018	Playford International, Australia	25,000	Hard	(Japan) Erika Sema	(Slovenia) Dalila Jakupović (Russia) Irina Khromacheva	6–2, 5–7, [5–10]
Loss	22–23	June 2018	ITF Singapore	25,000	Hard	(Japan) Miyabi Inoue	(Australia) Zoe Hives (Australia) Olivia Tjandramulia	4–6, 6–4, [6–10]
Win	23–23	Jun 2019	ITF Hong Kong	25,000	Hard	(Papua New Guinea) Abigail Tere-Apisah	(Japan) Erina Hayashi (Japan) Momoko Kobori	6–3, 2–6, [10–6]
Win	24–23	Jun 2019	ITF Jakarta, Indonesia	25,000	Hard	(Japan) Haruka Kaji	(Indonesia) Beatrice Gumulya (Indonesia) Jessy Rompies	6–2, 4–6, [10–7]
Win	25–23	Jul 2019	Challenger de Granby, Canada	80,000	Hard	(Japan) Haruka Kaji	(United States) Quinn Gleason (United States) Ingrid Neel	7–6^{(5)}, 5–7, [10–8]
Loss	25–24	Nov 2019	ITF Tokyo Open, Japan	100,000	Hard	(Japan) Haruka Kaji	(South Korea) Choi Ji-hee (South Korea) Han Na-lae	3–6, 3–6
Loss	25–25	Sep 2022	ITF Yeongwol, South Korea	15,000	Hard	(Japan) Riko Sawayanagi	(South Korea) Back Da-yeon (South Korea) Lee Eun-hye	5–7, 6–3, [11–13]
Loss	25–26	Nov 2022	ITF Tokyo Open, Japan	60,000	Hard (i)	(Japan) Mai Hontama	(Chinese Taipei) Hsieh Yu-chieh (Indonesia) Jessy Rompies	4–6, 3–6
Loss	25–27	May 2023	Kurume Cup, Japan	60,000	Grass	(Japan) Funa Kozaki	(Australia) Talia Gibson (China) Wang Yafan	3–6, 3–6
