= Kim Mi-ok =

South Korean tennis player

- Country (sports): South Korea
- Born: 1 October 1978 (age 46)
- Plays: Right-handed
- Prize money: $26,421

Singles
- Career record: 56–39
- Career titles: 3 ITF
- Highest ranking: No. 451 (11 October 2004)

Doubles
- Career record: 92–32
- Career titles: 13 ITF
- Highest ranking: No. 257 (19 Jul 2004)

Team competitions
- Fed Cup: 6–4
Medal record
Asian Games
Gold medal – first place	2002 Busan	Women's doubles
Summer Universiade
Silver medal – second place	2001 Beijing	Women's doubles

Kim Mi-ok (born 1 October 1978) is a South Korean former professional tennis player.

== Tennis career ==
A right-handed player, Kim was a gold medalist for South Korea at the 2002 Asian Games, partnering Choi Young-ja in the women's doubles. The pair, who were unseeded, won the gold medal with a win in the final over the tournament's top seeds, Indonesians Wynne Prakusya and Angelique Widjaja.

Between 2002 and 2006, she represented South Korea in a total of nine ties. Her only singles win came against Hong Kong's Kristin Godridge and she won five doubles rubbers.

Kim has featured mostly in ITF level events during her professional career, with three singles and thirteen doubles titles to her name. She made a WTA Tour main-draw appearance in the doubles at the Korea Open in 2005, reaching the quarter-finals. They defeated Marion Bartoli and Tamarine Tanasugarn in the first round.

Initially retiring in 2006, Kim has played in the occasional ITF tournament in her home country since 2016 and won two $25k doubles titles in 2018.

== ITF finals ==
$25,000 tournaments
$15,000 tournaments
$10,000 tournaments

=== Singles: 5 (3–2) ===
Outcome	No.	Date	Tournament	Surface	Opponent	Score
Winner	1.	22 July 2002	Incheon, South Korea	Hard	(Japan) Seiko Okamoto	4–6, 6–3, 6–4
Runner-up	1.	31 May 2004	Changwon, South Korea	Hard	(South Korea) Lee Eun-jeong	7–6^{(1)}, 3–6, 4–6
Winner	2.	5 July 2005	Daegu, South Korea	Hard	(South Korea) Lee Eun-jeong	6–2, 6–0
Runner-up	2.	17 July 2005	Seogwipo, South Korea	Hard	(South Korea) Yoo Mi	2–6, 3–6
Winner	3.	16 May 2006	Daegu, South Korea	Hard	(South Korea) Lim Sae-mi	4–6, 6–4, 6–3

=== Doubles: 18 (13–5) ===
Outcome	No.	Date	Tournament	Surface	Partner	Opponents	Score
Winner	1.	3 June 2001	Baotou, China	Hard	(South Korea) Choi Jin-young	(China) Ma Enyue (China) Xie Yanze	6–3, 6–3
Winner	2.	17 June 2001	Seoul, South Korea	Hard	(South Korea) Choi Jin-young	(South Korea) Chung Yang-jin (South Korea) Lee Eun-jeong	6–0, 6–1
Winner	3.	25 June 2001	Incheon, South Korea	Hard	(South Korea) Choi Jin-young	(China) Liu Jingjing (China) Chen Yan	6–1, 6–3
Winner	4.	21 April 2002	Seoul, South Korea	Hard	(South Korea) Choi Jin-young	(Chinese Taipei) Chan Chin-wei (Chinese Taipei) Hsieh Su-wei	6–2, 7–6^{(4)}
Winner	5.	22 July 2002	Incheon, South Korea	Hard	(South Korea) Choi Young-ja	(South Korea) Kim Eun-sook (South Korea) Cho Eun-hye	6–2, 6–4
Winner	6.	20 April 2003	Ho Chi Minh City, Vietnam	Hard	(South Korea) Choi Jin-young	(Japan) Shiho Hisamatsu (Japan) Seiko Okamoto	6–1, 6–2
Winner	7.	15 June 2003	Seoul, South Korea	Hard	(South Korea) Choi Jin-young	(Chinese Taipei) Chan Chin-wei (Chinese Taipei) Chuang Chia-jung	6–2, 4–6, 7–5
Winner	8.	27 July 2003	Changwon, South Korea	Hard	(South Korea) Choi Jin-young	(Japan) Shizu Katsumi (Japan) Akiko Kinebuchi	6–3, 6–4
Winner	9.	30 May 2004	Seoul, South Korea	Hard	(South Korea) Choi Jin-young	(Japan) Shiho Hisamatsu (Japan) Remi Tezuka	4–6, 6–1, 6–1
Runner-up	1.	26 June 2004	Incheon, South Korea	Hard	(South Korea) Choi Jin-young	(Chinese Taipei) Chan Chin-wei (Chinese Taipei) Hsieh Su-wei	2–6, 0–6
Winner	10.	11 July 2004	Seoul, South Korea	Hard	(South Korea) Lee Jin-a	(Chinese Taipei) Chan Chin-wei (Chinese Taipei) Chen Yi	6–4, 6–4
Runner-up	2.	17 July 2005	Seogwipo, South Korea	Hard	(South Korea) Chang Kyung-mi	(South Korea) Yoo Mi (South Korea) Chae Kyung-yee	2–6, 1–6
Runner-up	3.	21 May 2006	Daegu, South Korea	Hard	(South Korea) Chang Kyung-mi	(South Korea) Yoo Mi (South Korea) Lee Jin-a	6–4, 4–6, 2–6
Winner	11.	25 June 2006	Changwon, South Korea	Hard	(South Korea) Chang Kyung-mi	(China) Chen Yanchong (China) Liu Wanting	7–5, 6–1
Runner-up	4.	9 July 2016	Gimcheon, South Korea	Hard	(South Korea) Kim Hae-sung	(Hong Kong) Katherine Ip (Indonesia) Jessy Rompies	3–6, 3–6
Runner-up	5.	4 September 2016	Yeongwol, South Korea	Hard	(South Korea) Kim Ju-eun	(South Korea) Jung So-hee (South Korea) Park Sang-hee	7–5, 4–6, [2–10]
Winner	12.	12 June 2018	Gyeongsan, South Korea	Hard	(South Korea) Yu Min-hwa	(South Korea) Jung So-hee (South Korea) Park Sang-hee	6–2, 1–6, [10–5]
Winner	13.	21 August 2018	Gimcheon, South Korea	Hard	(South Korea) Jung So-hee	(United Kingdom) Emily Appleton (Chinese Taipei) Joanna Garland	6–7^{(5)}, 7–6^{(5)}, [14–12]
