= Chan Chin-wei =

Taiwanese tennis player

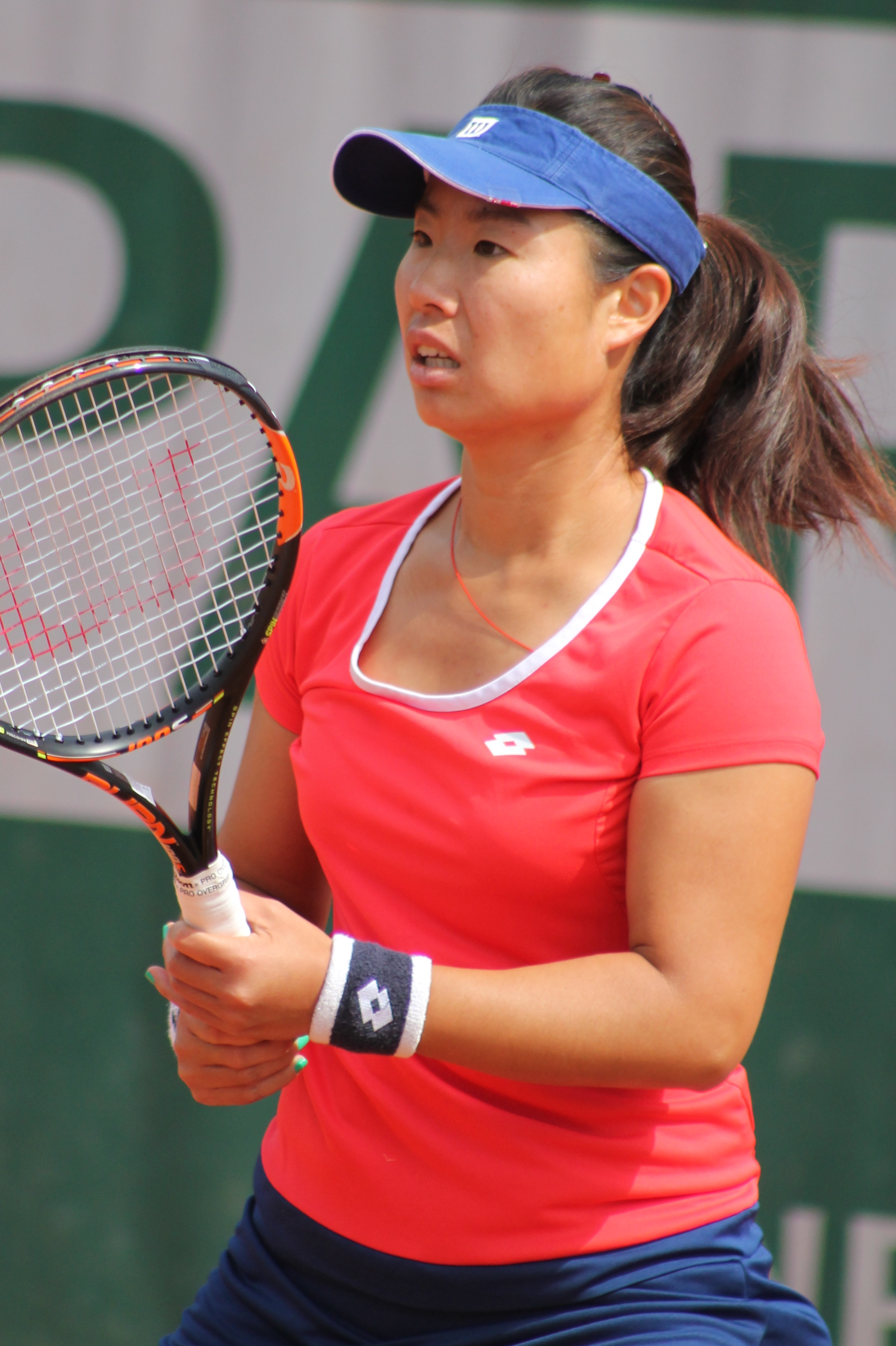
- Chan Chin-wei at the 2015 French Open
- Country (sports): Chinese Taipei
- Residence: Kaohsiung, Taiwan
- Born: 8 January 1985 (age 41) Kaohsiung
- Height: 1.69 m (5 ft 7 in)
- Turned pro: 2003
- Plays: Right (two-handed backhand)
- Prize money: $423,041

Singles
- Career record: 378–290
- Career titles: 6 ITF
- Highest ranking: No. 152 (2 October 2006)

Grand Slam singles results
- Australian Open: Q3 (2007)
- French Open: Q2 (2006)
- Wimbledon: Q2 (2006)
- US Open: Q2 (2008)

Doubles
- Career record: 485–270
- Career titles: 1 WTA, 1 WTA Challenger
- Highest ranking: No. 74 (3 August 2015)

Grand Slam doubles results
- Australian Open: 1R (2016, 2017)
- French Open: 1R (2015)
- Wimbledon: 1R (2006, 2015, 2016)
- US Open: 1R (2015)

Team competitions
- Fed Cup: 21–19
Medal record
Representing Chinese Taipei
Women's tennis
Asian Games
Gold medal – first place	2014 Incheon	Team
Silver medal – second place	2014 Incheon	Women's doubles
Gold medal – first place	2006 Doha	Team
Bronze medal – third place	2002 Busan	Team
Universiade
Gold medal – first place	2011 Shenzhen	Mixed doubles
Gold medal – first place	2007 Bangkok	Women's doubles
Bronze medal – third place	2007 Bangkok	Women's singles
Bronze medal – third place	2005 Izmir	Women's singles
Gold medal – first place	2003 Daegu	Women's doubles

Chan Chin-wei
- Traditional Chinese: 詹謹瑋
- Simplified Chinese: 詹谨玮
Transcriptions
Standard Mandarin
- Hanyu Pinyin: Zhān Jǐnwěi

Chan Chin-wei (Chinese: 詹謹瑋, born 8 January 1985) is a former professional tennis player from Taiwan.

She won one doubles title on the WTA Tour, along with six singles and 49 doubles titles on the ITF Women's Circuit. She reached her best singles ranking of world No. 152 in October 2006. On 3 August 2015, she peaked at No. 74 in the WTA doubles rankings.

== Career ==
Chan started playing tennis at the age of ten. In 2002, she played for Taiwan's Fed Cup team for the first time. Her coach was Chan Fu-chen.

In 2013, she won the doubles competition of the Korea Open in Seoul, her first title on the WTA Tour. She also won three $25k events (in Changwon, Huzhu and Tsukuba) on the ITF Circuit.

In September 2014, Chan won the doubles competition at the Suzhou Ladies Open, her first doubles title on WTA 125 tournaments. In that year, she also won two $50k events (in Quanzhou and Seoul).

In July 2018, she played her last matches on the pro circuit.

== WTA Tour finals ==
=== Doubles: 3 (1 title, 2 runner-ups) ===
Legend Premier International (1–2)	Finals by surface Hard (1–2) Grass (0–0)

Result	Date	Tournament	Surface	Partner	Opponents	Score
Loss	Aug 2007	Nordic Light Open, Sweden	Hard	(Ukraine) Tetiana Luzhanska	(Spain) Anabel Medina Garrigues (Spain) Virginia Ruano Pascual	1–6, 5–7, [6–10]
Loss	Sep 2011	Guangzhou Open, China	Hard	(China) Han Xinyun	(Chinese Taipei) Hsieh Su-wei (China) Zheng Saisai	2–6, 1–6
Win	Sep 2013	Korea Open, South Korea	Hard	(China) Xu Yifan	(United States) Raquel Kops-Jones (United States) Abigail Spears	7–5, 6–3

== WTA 125 finals ==
=== Doubles: 4 (1 title, 3 runner-ups) ===
Result	Date	Tournament	Surface	Partner	Opponents	Score
Loss	Jul 2014	Jiangxi Open, China	Hard	(China) Xu Yifan	(Japan) Junri Namigata (Chinese Taipei) Chuang Chia-jung	6–7^{(4)}, 3–6
Win	Sep 2014	Suzhou Ladies Open, China	Hard	(Chinese Taipei) Chuang Chia-jung	(Japan) Misa Eguchi (Japan) Eri Hozumi	6–1, 3–6, [10–7]
Loss	Jul 2015	Jiangxi Open, China	Hard	(China) Wang Yafan	(Chinese Taipei) Chang Kai-chen (China) Zheng Saisai	3–6, 6–4, [3–10]
Loss	Sep 2015	Dalian Open, China	Hard	(Croatia) Darija Jurak	(China) Zhang Kailin (China) Zheng Saisai	3–6, 4–6

== ITF Circuit finals ==
Legend
$100,000 tournaments
$75,000 tournaments
$50,000 tournaments
$25,000 tournaments
$15,000 tournaments
$10,000 tournaments

=== Singles: 18 (6–12) ===
Result	No.	Date	Tournament	Surface	Opponent	Score
Loss	1.	23 March 2003	ITF Yarrawonga, Australia	Grass	(Australia) Monique Adamczak	3–6, 6–7^{(4)}
Win	1.	22 November 2003	ITF Tainan, Taiwan	Clay	(Chinese Taipei) Hsu Wen-hsin	5–7, 6–4, 6–4
Loss	2.	12 April 2004	ITF Yamaguchi, Japan	Clay	(South Korea) Kim So-jung	6–7^{(7)}, 2–6
Loss	3.	20 April 2004	ITF Hamanako, Japan	Carpet	(United States) Tiffany Dabek	2–6, 3–6
Win	2.	9 April 2005	ITF Mumbai, India	Hard	(Thailand) Montinee Tangphong	6–2, 6–3
Win	3.	16 April 2005	ITF Mumbai, India	Hard	(India) Rushmi Chakravarthi	6–4, 6–2
Win	4.	12 June 2006	Incheon Open, South Korea	Hard	(Chinese Taipei) Hwang I-hsuan	6–1, 6–4
Loss	4.	7 May 2007	ITF Gimcheon, South Korea	Hard	(Chinese Taipei) Hsieh Su-wei	2–6, 4–6
Loss	5.	20 May 2007	ITF Changwon, South Korea	Hard	(Russia) Regina Kulikova	3–6, 6–4, 2–6
Loss	6.	16 July 2007	ITF Rome, Italy	Clay	(Bosnia and Herzegovina) Mervana Jugić-Salkić	3–6, 4–6
Loss	7.	22 June 2008	ITF Houston, United States	Hard (i)	(United States) Kristie Ahn	6–7^{(7)}, 6–0, 6–7^{(2)}
Loss	8.	6 July 2008	ITF Boston, United States	Hard	(Georgia (country)) Anna Tatishvili	6–2, 1–6, 3–6
Loss	9.	13 June 2011	ITF Taipei, Taiwan	Hard	(United States) Hsu Chieh-yu	1–6, 4–6
Loss	10.	4 September 2011	ITF Tsukuba, Japan	Hard	(Japan) Aiko Nakamura	3–6, 6–2, 3–6
Loss	11.	10 June 2012	ITF Taipei, Taiwan	Hard	(Thailand) Nungnadda Wannasuk	4–6, 6–7^{(3)}
Win	5.	1 July 2012	Incheon Open, South Korea	Hard	(Hong Kong) Zhang Ling	3–6, 6–2, 6–1
Loss	12.	24 June 2013	ITF Huzhu, China	Hard	(Serbia) Barbara Bonić	2–6, 4–6
Win	6.	24 March 2014	ITF Shenzhen, China	Hard	(China) Liu Fangzhou	2–6, 6–3, 6–3

=== Doubles: 81 (49–32) ===
Result	No.	Date	Tournament	Surface	Partner	Opponents	Score
Win	1.	5 August 2001	ITF Bangkok, Thailand	Hard	(Chinese Taipei) Hsieh Su-wei	(South Korea) Chae Kyung-yee (South Korea) Kim Jin-hee	6–1, 6–3
Win	2.	3 February 2002	ITF Wellington, New Zealand	Hard	(Chinese Taipei) Chuang Chia-jung	(Australia) Nicole Kriz (Australia) Sarah Stone	4–6, 7–6^{(3)}, 6–2
Win	3.	21 April 2002	ITF Gunma, Japan	Carpet	(Chinese Taipei) Hsieh Su-wei	(Japan) Kumiko Iijima (Japan) Mari Inoue	6–0, 6–1
Loss	1.	21 April 2002	ITF Seoul, South Korea	Hard	(Chinese Taipei) Hsieh Su-wei	(South Korea) Choi Jin-young (South Korea) Kim Mi-ok	2–6, 6–7^{(4)}
Loss	2.	26 May 2002	ITF Tianjin, China	Hard (i)	(Chinese Taipei) Chuang Chia-jung	(China) Yan Zi (China) Zheng Jie	0–6, 4–6
Win	4.	2 June 2002	ITF Tianjin, China	Hard (i)	(Hong Kong) Tong Ka-po	(South Korea) Choi Jin-young (South Korea) Choi Young-ja	6–3, 3–6, 6–1
Loss	3.	15 June 2003	ITF Seoul, South Korea	Hard	(Chinese Taipei) Chuang Chia-jung	(South Korea) Choi Jin-young (South Korea) Kim Mi-ok	2–6, 6–4, 5–7
Win	5.	10 August 2003	ITF Nonthaburi, Thailand	Hard	(Chinese Taipei) Chuang Chia-jung	(South Korea) Kim Jin-hee (Japan) Ryoko Takemura	6–2, 7–5
Win	6.	17 August 2003	ITF Nakhon Ratchasima, Thailand	Hard	(Chinese Taipei) Chuang Chia-jung	(China) Dong Yanhua (China) Zhang Yao	6–4, 6–1
Win	7.	22 November 2003	ITF Tainan, Taiwan	Clay	(Chinese Taipei) Chuang Chia-jung	(Japan) Satomi Kinjo (Chinese Taipei) Wang I-ting	6–3, 6–1
Loss	4.	20 April 2004	ITF Hamanako, Japan	Carpet	(Chinese Taipei) Chen Yi	(South Korea) Kim Hea-mi (Japan) Keiko Taguchi	1–6, 1–6
Win	8.	21 June 2004	Incheon Open, South Korea	Hard	(Chinese Taipei) Hsieh Su-wei	(South Korea) Choi Jin-young (South Korea) Kim Mi-ok	6–2, 6–0
Loss	5.	5 July 2004	ITF Seoul, South Korea	Hard	(Chinese Taipei) Chen Yi	(South Korea) Kim Mi-ok (South Korea) Lee Jin-a	4–6, 4–6
Win	9.	19 October 2004	ITF Haibara, Japan	Carpet	(Chinese Taipei) Chan Yung-jan	(Chinese Taipei) Chuang Chia-jung (Chinese Taipei) Hsieh Su-wei	7–6^{(5)}, 4–6, 7–6^{(3)}
Win	10.	22 November 2004	ITF Mount Gambier, Australia	Hard	(Chinese Taipei) Chan Yung-jan	(Japan) Ryōko Fuda (Chinese Taipei) Hsieh Su-wei	6–3, 5–7, 7–5
Win	11.	9 April 2005	ITF Mumbai, India	Hard	(Russia) Julia Efremova	(India) Sanaa Bhambri (Romania) Mihaela Buzărnescu	6–2, 6–1
Loss	6.	16 May 2005	ITF Changwon, South Korea	Hard	(Chinese Taipei) Hsieh Su-wei	(Chinese Taipei) Chuang Chia-jung (Japan) Seiko Okamoto	2–6, 5–7
Win	12.	31 May 2005	ITF Gunma, Japan	Hard	(Chinese Taipei) Hsieh Su-wei	(Japan) Ayami Takase (Japan) Mayumi Yamamoto	6–2, 1–1 ret.
Win	13.	6 June 2005	ITF Seoul, South Korea	Hard	(Chinese Taipei) Hsieh Su-wei	(Japan) Maki Arai (South Korea) Lee Eun-jeong	6–2, 6–1
Win	14.	13 June 2005	Incheon Open, South Korea	Hard	(Chinese Taipei) Hsieh Su-wei	(South Korea) Choi Jin-young (South Korea) Lee Ye-ra	6–2, 7–6^{(4)}
Win	15.	19 July 2005	Kurume Cup, Japan	Grass	(Chinese Taipei) Hsieh Su-wei	(Japan) Ayumi Morita (Japan) Erika Sema	6–4, 6–3
Loss	7.	13 November 2005	ITF Shenzhen, China	Hard	(Chinese Taipei) Hsu Wen-hsin	(Chinese Taipei) Hsieh Su-wei (China) Yan Zi	0–6, 2–6
Win	16.	29 November 2005	ITF Palm Beach Gardens, United States	Clay	(Chinese Taipei) Hsieh Su-wei	(Czech Republic) Olga Vymetálková (Czech Republic) Kateřina Böhmová	7–6^{(2)}, 7–5
Loss	8.	15 January 2006	ITF Tampa, United States	Hard	(Chinese Taipei) Hsu Wen-hsin	(South Africa) Chanelle Scheepers (United States) Aleke Tsoubanos	6–3, 6–7^{(4)}, 3–6
Win	17.	29 January 2006	Waikoloa Challenger, United States	Hard	(Canada) Marie-Ève Pelletier	(United States) Julie Ditty (United States) Lilia Osterloh	7–5, 4–6, 6–2
Win	18.	2 April 2006	ITF Hammond, United States	Hard	(Ukraine) Tetiana Luzhanska	(Uzbekistan) Akgul Amanmuradova (Indonesia) Romana Tedjakusuma	6–1, 6–3
Win	19.	2 May 2006	Kangaroo Cup, Japan	Carpet	(Chinese Taipei) Hsieh Su-wei	(Chinese Taipei) Chan Yung-jan (Chinese Taipei) Chuang Chia-jung	7–6^{(5)}, 3–6, 7–5
Loss	9.	30 May 2006	ITF Tianjin, China	Hard	(Chinese Taipei) Chen Yi	(China) Ji Chunmei (China) Sun Shengnan	6–3, 6–7^{(7)}, 1–6
Loss	10.	9 July 2006	ITF College Park, United States	Hard	(South Africa) Natalie Grandin	(United States) Lindsay Nelson (United States) Anne Yelsey	1–6, 3–6
Win	20.	25 July 2006	Lexington Challenger, United States	Hard	Abigail Spears	(Uzbekistan) Akgul Amanmuradova (United States) Varvara Lepchenko	6–1, 6–1
Win	21.	6 August 2006	ITF Washington, United States	Hard	(Ukraine) Tetiana Luzhanska	(Uzbekistan) Akgul Amanmuradova (United States) Varvara Lepchenko	6–2, 1–6, 6–0
Loss	11.	14 November 2006	ITF Kaohsiung, Taiwan	Hard	(Chinese Taipei) Hsieh Su-wei	(Chinese Taipei) Chan Yung-jan (Chinese Taipei) Chuang Chia-jung	6–7^{(1)}, 1–6
Loss	12.	13 March 2007	ITF Orange, United States	Hard	(Ukraine) Tetiana Luzhanska	(Argentina) Jorgelina Cravero (Chinese Taipei) Hsieh Su-wei	3–6, 1–6
Win	22.	20 March 2007	ITF Redding, United States	Hard	(United States) Julie Ditty	(Argentina) Jorgelina Cravero (Chinese Taipei) Hsieh Su-wei	6–3, 6–2
Win	23.	1 April 2007	ITF Hammond, United States	Hard	(Ukraine) Tetiana Luzhanska	(Serbia) Teodora Mirčić (Canada) Marie-Ève Pelletier	6–1, 7–6^{(3)}
Win	24.	7 May 2007	ITF Gimcheon, South Korea	Hard	(Chinese Taipei) Hsieh Su-wei	(Ukraine) Tetiana Luzhanska (Indonesia) Romana Tedjakusuma	7–5, 6–4
Win	25.	20 May 2007	ITF Changwon, South Korea	Hard	(Chinese Taipei) Kao Shao-yuan	(Indonesia) Romana Tedjakusuma (Thailand) Napaporn Tongsalee	6–4, 6–4
Loss	13.	8 June 2007	ITF Changsha, China	Hard	(Japan) Kumiko Iijima	(China) Huang Lei (China) Xu Yifan	3–6, 4–6
Win	26.	16 July 2007	ITF Rome, Italy	Clay	(Ukraine) Tetiana Luzhanska	(Ukraine) Irina Buryachok (Austria) Patricia Mayr-Achleitner	7–6^{(7)}, 6–4
Loss	14.	18 February 2008	ITF Clearwater, United States	Hard	(Japan) Seiko Okamoto	(United Kingdom) Anna Fitzpatrick (Montenegro) Ana Veselinović	2–6, 6–3, [6–10]
Loss	15.	3 March 2008	Las Vegas Open, United States	Hard	(Ukraine) Tetiana Luzhanska	(Hungary) Melinda Czink (Czech Republic) Renata Voráčová	3–6, 2–6
Loss	16.	17 March 2008	ITF Redding, United States	Hard	(Ukraine) Tetiana Luzhanska	(United States) Angela Haynes (United States) Abigail Spears	4–6, 3–6
Win	27.	27 April 2008	Incheon Open, South Korea	Hard	(Australia) Jarmila Wolfe	(South Korea) Chang Kyung-mi (South Korea) Lee Jin-a	1–6, 6–1, [10–5]
Win	28.	4 May 2008	ITF Gimcheon, South Korea	Hard	(Australia) Jarmila Wolfe	(South Korea) Cho Yoon-jeong (South Korea) Kim Jin-hee	6–2, 6–0
Win	29.	6 July 2008	ITF Boston, United States	Hard	(South Africa) Natalie Grandin	(France) Yulia Fedossova (United States) Varvara Lepchenko	6–4, 6–3
Loss	17.	13 July 2008	ITF Allentown, United States	Hard	(South Africa) Natalie Grandin	(United States) Carly Gullickson (Australia) Nicole Kriz	2–6, 3–6
Win	30.	27 July 2008	Lexington Challenger, United States	Hard	Kimberly Couts	(United States) Lindsay Lee-Waters (United States) Melanie Oudin	2–6, 6–3, [10–8]
Win	31.	6 September 2008	ITF Tsukuba, Japan	Hard	(Chinese Taipei) Hwang I-hsuan	(Japan) Maki Arai (Japan) Yurika Sema	6–0, 6–4
Win	32.	8 September 2008	ITF Nato, Japan	Carpet	(Chinese Taipei) Chen Yi	(Japan) Tomoko Dokei (Japan) Yuko Kurata	6–3, 6–2
Loss	18.	27 October 2008	ITF Tokyo, Japan	Hard	(Chinese Taipei) Chen Yi	(Japan) Kimiko Date-Krumm (Japan) Rika Fujiwara	5–7, 3–6
Loss	19.	23 March 2009	ITF Hammond, United States	Hard	(Ukraine) Tetiana Luzhanska	(South Africa) Surina De Beer (United States) Lilia Osterloh	4–6, 3–6
Win	33.	21 August 2009	ITF Pingguo, China	Hard	(Chinese Taipei) Hwang I-hsuan	(China) Lu Jingjing (China) Sun Shengnan	3–6, 7–5, [10–7]
Win	34.	15 January 2010	ITF Pingguo, China	Hard	(China) Xu Yifan	(China) Ji Chunmei (China) Liu Wanting	6–3, 6–1
Loss	20.	3 April 2010	ITF Pelham, United States	Clay	(Australia) Nicole Kriz	(United States) Mallory Cecil (United States) Jamie Hampton	4–6, 3–6
Loss	21.	30 August 2010	ITF Tsukuba, Japan	Hard	(Chinese Taipei) Chen Yi	(Japan) Kumiko Iijima (Japan) Akiko Yonemura	6–4, 6–7, 4–6
Win	35.	27 September 2010	Ningbo International Open, China	Hard	(Chinese Taipei) Chen Yi	(United States) Jill Craybas (Ukraine) Olga Savchuk	6–3, 3–6, 6–4
Win	36.	10 June 2011	ITF Taipei, Taiwan	Hard	(Chinese Taipei) Kao Shao-yuan	(Chinese Taipei) Tsao Fang-chi (Chinese Taipei) Yang Chia-hsien	6–3, 6–2
Win	37.	17 June 2011	ITF Taipei, Taiwan	Hard	(Chinese Taipei) Kao Shao-yuan	(Chinese Taipei) Hsieh Shu-ying (Chinese Taipei) Juan Ting-fei	6–1, 7–5
Win	38.	4 September 2011	ITF Tsukuba, Japan	Hard	(Chinese Taipei) Hsu Wen-hsi	(South Korea) Kim So-jung (Japan) Erika Takao	6–1, 6–1
Loss	22.	12 September 2011	Ningbo International Open, China	Hard	(China) Han Xinyun	(Ukraine) Tetiana Luzhanska (China) Zheng Saisai	6–4, 5–7, [4–10]
Win	39.	8 October 2011	Kōfu International Open, Japan	Hard	(Chinese Taipei) Hsu Wen-hsin	(Japan) Remi Tezuka (Japan) Akiko Yonemura	6–3, 6–4
Loss	23.	24 March 2012	ITF Phuket, Thailand	Hard	(China) Zheng Saisai	(Russia) Natela Dzalamidze (Russia) Marta Sirotkina	4–6, 1–6
Loss	24.	6 May 2012	Kangaroo Cup, Japan	Hard	(Chinese Taipei) Hsu Wen-hsin	(United States) Jessica Pegula (China) Zheng Saisai	4–6, 6–3, [4–10]
Loss	25.	30 July 2012	ITF Beijing, China	Hard	(China) Han Xinyun	(China) Liu Wanting (China) Sun Shengnan	7–5, 0–6, [7–10]
Win	40.	27 October 2012	ITF Taipei, Taiwan	Hard	(France) Caroline Garcia	(Chinese Taipei) Kao Shao-yuan (Chinese Taipei) Lee Hua-chen	4–6, 6–4, [10–6]
Loss	26.	29 April 2013	ITF Seoul, South Korea	Hard	(China) Zhang Nannan	(China) Liu Wanting (China) Yang Zhaoxuan	2–6, 2–6
Loss	27.	12 May 2013	ITF Seoul, South Korea	Hard	(China) Zhang Nannan	(China) Han Xinyun (China) Ye Qiuyu	6–7^{(3)}, 6–4, [4–10]
Win	41.	27 May 2013	ITF Changwon, South Korea	Hard	(China) Liu Chang	(South Korea) Kim Ju-eun (South Korea) Han Sung-hee	6–0, 6–2
Loss	28.	9 June 2013	ITF Taipei, Taiwan	Hard	(Chinese Taipei) Hsu Wen-hsin	(Chinese Taipei) Kao Shao-yua (Chinese Taipei) Lee Hua-chen	6–4, 3–6, [7–10]
Win	42.	24 June 2013	ITF Huzhu, China	Hard	(China) Sun Shengnan	(China) Liu Chang (China) Zhou Yimiao	6–4, 6–3
Win	43.	1 September 2013	ITF Tsukuba, Japan	Hard	(Chinese Taipei) Hsu Wen-hsin	(Chinese Taipei) Lee Ya-hsuan (Japan) Yumi Miyazaki	6–2, 6–1
Win	44.	3 March 2014	Blossom Cup, China	Hard	(China) Xu Yifan	(China) Sun Ziyue (China) Xu Shilin	7–6^{(4)}, 6–1
Loss	29.	17 March 2014	ITF Shenzhen, China	Hard	(China) Liu Chang	(China) Han Xinyun (China) Zhang Kailin	3–6, 6–2, [11–13]
Win	45.	27 April 2014	ITF Seoul, South Korea	Hard	(Chinese Taipei) Chuang Chia-jung	(France) Irena Pavlovic (Czech Republic) Kristýna Plíšková	6–4, 6–3
Win	46.	26 May 2014	ITF Zhengzhou, China	Hard	(China) Liang Chen	(China) Han Xinyun (China) Zhang Kailin	6–3, 6–3
Win	47.	18 May 2015	ITF Seoul, South Korea	Hard	(Chinese Taipei) Lee Ya-hsuan	(South Korea) Hong Seung-yeon (South Korea) Kang Seo-kyung	6–2, 6–1
Loss	30.	26 October 2015	ITF Nanjing, China	Hard	(China) Zhang Kailin	(Japan) Shuko Aoyama (Japan) Eri Hozumi	5–7, 7–6^{(7)}, [7–10]
Win	48.	18 August 2017	ITF Nonthaburi, India	Hard	(South Korea) Choi Ji-hee	(Thailand) Varatchaya Wongteanchai (Thailand) Varunya Wongteanchai	2–6, 6–1, [13–11]
Win	49.	13 October 2017	ITF Nonthaburi, India	Hard	(Chinese Taipei) Liang En-shuo	(Thailand) Nudnida Luangnam (Thailand) Varunya Wongteanchai	6–1, 6–4
Loss	31.	29 December 2017	ITF Hong Kong, China	Hard	(China) Lu Jiaxi	(Chinese Taipei) Chen Pei-hsuan (Chinese Taipei) Wu Fang-hsien	1–6, 0–6
Loss	32.	28 July 2018	ITF Taipei, Taiwan	Hard	(Japan) Kotomi Takahata	(Chinese Taipei) Joanna Garland (Chinese Taipei) Lee Hua-chen	1–6, 6–3, [1–10]
