= Kim Jin-hee (tennis) =

South Korean tennis player

- Country (sports): South Korea
- Born: 14 June 1981 (age 44)
- Turned pro: 1998
- Plays: Right (two-handed backhand)
- Prize money: $88,458

Singles
- Career record: 173–156
- Career titles: 4 ITF
- Highest ranking: No. 235 (8 September 2003)

Doubles
- Career record: 147–130
- Career titles: 9 ITF
- Highest ranking: No. 191 (26 July 2004)

Kim Jin-hee (born 14 June 1981) is a South Korean former professional tennis player.

== Career ==
Jin-hee attempted to qualify for a number of WTA Tour events, but has failed to qualify in most of them. She lost to Liza Andriyani in the first round of qualifying in Bali, 2002. However, she qualified for the 2002 Japan Open, where she lost in the first round. In 2003, she lost in the second round of qualifying at the Pan Pacific Open, before she took part in the Hyderabad Open where she lost in the qualifying round to Manisha Malhotra.

However, she also failed to qualify for the Japan Open before gaining entry into the main draw as a lucky loser and losing to Maria Sharapova. In 2004, she played at the Korea Open losing in the first round.

== ITF Circuit finals ==
$25,000 tournaments
$10,000 tournaments

=== Singles: 8 (4–4) ===
Outcome	No.	Date	Tournament	Surface	Opponent	Score
Runner-up	1.	30 September 2001	ITF Kyoto, Japan	Carpet (i)	(Australia) Samantha Stosur	1–6, 5–7
Winner	2.	25 November 2001	ITF Kofu, Japan	Clay	(Japan) Sachie Umehara	6–1, 4–6, 7–6^{(4)}
Winner	3.	27 July 2003	ITF Changwon, South Korea	Hard	(South Korea) Chang Kyung-mi	w/o
Runner-up	4.	14 August 2003	ITF Nakhon Ratchasima, Thailand	Hard	(India) Isha Lakhani	4–6, 2–6
Winner	5.	30 May 2004	ITF Seoul, South Korea	Hard	(Chinese Taipei) Hsieh Su-wei	6–2, 6–4
Winner	6.	22 May 2005	ITF Changwon, South Korea	Hard	(Chinese Taipei) Chuang Chia-jung	4–6, 6–3, 6–4
Runner-up	7.	11 June 2005	ITF Seoul, South Korea	Hard	(Chinese Taipei) Hsieh Su-wei	2–6, 6–2, 3–6
Runner-up	8.	3 August 2008	ITF Surakarta, Indonesia	Hard	(Indonesia) Sandy Gumulya	7–6^{(5)}, 1–6, 2–6

=== Doubles: 23 (9–14) ===
Outcome	No.	Date	Tournament	Surface	Partner	Opponents	Score
Winner	1.	29 November 1998	ITF Manila, Philippines	Hard	(South Korea) Chang Kyung-mi	(Indonesia) Liza Andriyani (Indonesia) Irawati Iskandar	6–3, 7–6
Runner-up	2.	4 April 1999	ITF Incheon, South Korea	Clay	(South Korea) Chang Kyung-mi	(South Korea) Lee Eun-jeong (South Korea) Park Seon-young	3–6, 2–6
Runner-up	3.	5 November 2000	ITF Jakarta, Indonesia	Hard	(South Korea) Chae Kyung-yee	(Indonesia) Liza Andriyani (Indonesia) Angelique Widjaja	4–2, 3–5, 2–4, 4–0, 0–4
Winner	4.	19 November 2000	ITF Manila, Philippines	Hard	(South Korea) Chae Kyung-yee	(Germany) Catherine Turinsky (Netherlands) Andrea van den Hurk	4–2, 4–2, 4–0
Runner-up	5.	18 March 2001	ITF Kaohsiung, Taiwan	Hard	(South Korea) Chae Kyung-yee	(Indonesia) Dea Sumantri (Indonesia) Angelique Widjaja	3–6, 2–6
Runner-up	6.	22 July 2001	ITF Baltimore, United States	Hard	(Japan) Sachie Umehara	(United States) Celena McCoury (United States) Sarah Riske	3–6, 6–4, 2–6
Runner-up	7.	12 August 2001	ITF Bangkok, Thailand	Hard	(South Korea) Chae Kyung-yee	(Chinese Taipei) Chan Chin-wei (Chinese Taipei) Hsieh Su-wei	1–6, 3–6
Runner-up	8.	19 August 2001	ITF Bangkok, Thailand	Hard	(South Korea) Chae Kyung-yee	(Indonesia) Romana Tedjakusuma (Indonesia) Angelique Widjaja	6–4, 3–6, 5–7
Runner-up	9.	25 November 2001	ITF Kofu, Japan	Clay	(Chinese Taipei) Weng Tzu-ting	(Japan) Etsuko Kitazaki (Japan) Eriko Mizuno	6–4, 6–7^{(5)}, ret.
Winner	10.	3 December 2001	ITF Nonthaburi, Thailand	Hard	(Croatia) Ivana Abramović	(South Korea) Jeon Mi-ra (India) Manisha Malhotra	6–1, 7–5
Runner-up	11.	21 July 2002	ITF Baltimore, United States	Hard	(Belarus) Natallia Dziamidzenka	(Puerto Rico) Vilmarie Castellvi (United States) Agnes Wiski	1–6, 6–3, 3–6
Winner	12.	28 July 2002	ITF Evansville, United States	Hard	(Japan) Aiko Nakamura	(Australia) Gabrielle Baker (Australia) Deanna Roberts	6–4, 6–0
Runner-up	13.	10 August 2003	ITF Nonthaburi, Thailand	Hard	(Japan) Ryoko Takemura	(Chinese Taipei) Chan Chin-wei (Chinese Taipei) Chuang Chia-jung	2–6, 5–7
Winner	14.	6 June 2004	ITF Changwon, South Korea	Hard	(South Korea) Chang Kyung-mi	(Japan) Ayami Takase (Japan) Tomoko Yonemura	7–5, 6–4
Winner	15.	15 November 2004	ITF Nuriootpa, Australia	Hard	(South Korea) Cho Yoon-jeong	(Australia) Evie Dominikovic (Australia) Daniella Jeflea	7–5, 6–2
Runner-up	16.	7 July 2007	ITF Nagoya, Japan	Hard	(South Korea) Chang Kyung-mi	(Japan) Junri Namigata (Japan) Akiko Yonemura	2–6, 6–3, 4–6
Runner-up	17.	4 May 2008	ITF Gimcheon, South Korea	Hard	(South Korea) Cho Yoon-jeong	(Chinese Taipei) Chan Chin-wei (Australia) Jarmila Gajdošová	2–6, 0–6
Runner-up	18.	11 May 2008	ITF Changwon, South Korea	Hard	(South Korea) Cho Yoon-jeong	(South Korea) Chang Kyung-mi (South Korea) Lee Jin-a	5–7, 2–6
Winner	19.	28 July 2008	ITF Surakarta, Indonesia	Hard	(Chinese Taipei) Chen Yi	(Indonesia) Sandy Gumulya (Indonesia) Lavinia Tananta	6–2, 6–4
Runner-up	20.	4 August 2008	ITF Jakarta, Indonesia	Hard	(Chinese Taipei) Chen Yi	(Indonesia) Liza Andriyani (Indonesia) Angelique Widjaja	3–6, 1–6
Winner	21.	30 August 2008	ITF Gimhae, South Korea	Hard	(South Korea) Hong Da-jung	(South Korea) Kim Sun-jung (South Korea) Lee Cho-won	6–4, 6–2
Runner-up	22.	1 November 2010	ITF Manila, Philippines	Hard	(South Korea) Kim Ji-young	(China) Yang Zhaoxuan (China) Zhu Lin	4–6, 7–6^{(5)}, [7–10]
Winner	23.	11 September 2011	ITF Yeongwol, South Korea	Hard	(South Korea) Kim Ji-young	(Chinese Taipei) Lee Hua-chen (Chinese Taipei) Lee Pei-chi	6–1, 6–1
