= Lee Eun-jeong (tennis) =

South Korean tennis player

- Country (sports): South Korea
- Born: 27 October 1976 (age 48)
- Prize money: $24,754

Singles
- Career record: 81–40
- Career titles: 3 ITF
- Highest ranking: No. 316 (19 Jul 2004)

Doubles
- Career record: 1 ITF
- Highest ranking: No. 417 (6 Mar 2000)

Lee Eun-jeong (born 27 October 1976) is a South Korean former professional tennis player.

Lee began competing in professional tournaments in the 1990s and reached a best singles world ranking of 316 during her career. She won three singles titles on the ITF Women's Circuit in 2004, including the $25,000 Changwon Challenger. Her husband Kim Yong-seung was also a tennis player.

== ITF Circuit finals ==
Legend
$25,000 tournaments
$10,000 tournaments

=== Singles: 6 (3–3) ===
Outcome	No.	Date	Tournament	Surface	Opponent	Score
Runner-up	1.	Jun 2000	ITF Seoul, South Korea	Hard	(South Korea) Chung Yang-jin	4–6, 2–6
Winner	1.	Jun 2004	ITF Changwon, South Korea	Hard	(South Korea) Kim Mi-ok	6–7^{(1)}, 6–3, 6–4
Runner-up	2.	Jun 2004	ITF Incheon, South Korea	Hard	(Chinese Taipei) Chuang Chia-jung	3–6, 2–6
Winner	2.	Jul 2004	ITF Inchon, South Korea	Hard	(Japan) Junri Namigata	6–0, 3–6, 6–0
Winner	3.	Jul 2004	ITF Seoul, South Korea	Hard	(China) Hao Jie	6–4, 6–1
Runner-up	3.	Jul 2005	ITF Daegu, South Korea	Hard	(South Korea) Kim Mi-ok	2–6, 0–6

=== Doubles: 7 (1–6) ===
Outcome	No.	Date	Tournament	Surface	Partner	Opponents	Score
Runner-up	1.	Jun 1994	ITF Seoul, South Korea	Hard	(South Korea) Shin Bo-kyung	(South Korea) Kim Il-soon (South Korea) Kim Yeon-sook	7–6^{(2)}, 1–6, 0–6
Runner-up	2.	Aug 1997	ITF Samutprakarn, Thailand	Hard	(South Korea) Park Seon-young	(Indonesia) Wukirasih Sawondari (Indonesia) Wynne Prakusya	4–6, 5–7
Winner	1.	Apr 1999	ITF Incheon, South Korea	Clay	(South Korea) Park Seon-young	(South Korea) Kim Jin-hee (South Korea) Chang Kyung-mi	6–3, 6–2
Runner-up	3.	Jun 1999	ITF Shenzhen, China	Hard	(South Korea) Chung Yang-jin	(China) Li Na (China) Li Ting	3–6, 1–6
Runner-up	4.	Jun 2000	ITF Inchon, South Korea	Hard	(South Korea) Chung Yang-jin	(South Korea) Chang Kyung-mi (South Korea) Chae Kyung-yee	3–6, 6–4, 5–7
Runner-up	5.	Jun 2001	ITF Seoul, South Korea	Hard	(South Korea) Chung Yang-jin	(South Korea) Choi Jin-young (South Korea) Kim Mi-ok	0–6, 1–6
Runner-up	6.	Jun 2005	ITF Seoul, South Korea	Hard	(Japan) Maki Arai	(Chinese Taipei) Chan Chin-wei (Chinese Taipei) Hsieh Su-wei	2–6, 1–6
