= Choi Jin-young (tennis) =

South Korean tennis player

- Country (sports): South Korea
- Born: 24 August 1979 (age 45)
- Prize money: $27,308

Singles
- Highest ranking: No. 378 (6 May 2002)

Doubles
- Highest ranking: No. 266 (7 June 2004)

Choi Jin-young (born 24 August 1979) is a South Korean former professional tennis player.

Choi represented South Korea at the 2002 Asian Games and played in seven Fed Cup ties for her country.

As a professional player, Choi spent her career on the ITF Women's Circuit, where she won three singles and eight doubles titles. She reached a best singles ranking of 378 and was ranked as high as 266 in the world for doubles.

== ITF finals ==
$25,000 tournaments
$10,000 tournaments

=== Singles (3–2) ===
Outcome	No.	Date	Tournament	Surface	Opponent	Score
Winner	1.	28 March 1999	Seoul, South Korea	Clay	(South Korea) Choi Young-ja	4–6, 6–4, 6–1
Winner	2.	4 April 1999	Inchon, South Korea	Clay	(South Korea) Chung Yang-jin	6–7, 6–2, 6–1
Winner	3.	16 July 2000	Jakarta, Indonesia	Hard	(South Korea) Chae Kyung-yee	w/o
Runner-up	4.	3 June 2001	Baotou, China	Hard	(China) Peng Shuai	3–6, 4–6
Runner-up	5.	17 June 2001	Seoul, South Korea	Hard	(China) Sun Tiantian	6–3, 3–6, 1–6

=== Doubles (8-4) ===
Outcome	No.	Date	Tournament	Surface	Partner	Opponents	Score'
Runner-up	1.	23 July 2000	Jakarta, Indonesia	Hard	(Japan) Akiko Kinebuchi	(South Korea) Jeon Mi-ra (Indonesia) Wukirasih Sawondari	6–3, 5–7, 6–7^{(4)}
Winner	2.	3 June 2001	Baotou, China	Hard	(South Korea) Kim Mi-ok	(China) Ma Enyue (China) Xie Yanze	6–3, 6–3
Winner	3.	17 June 2001	Seoul, South Korea	Hard	(South Korea) Kim Mi-ok	(South Korea) Chung Yang-jin (South Korea) Lee Eun-jeong	6–0, 6–1
Winner	4.	25 June 2001	Inchon, South Korea	Hard	(South Korea) Kim Mi-ok	(China) Liu Jing-jing (China) Chen Yan	6–1, 6–3
Winner	5.	21 April 2002	Seoul, South Korea	Hard	(South Korea) Kim Mi-ok	(Chinese Taipei) Chan Chin-wei (Chinese Taipei) Hsieh Su-wei	6–2, 7–6^{(4)}
Runner-up	6.	2 June 2002	Tianjin, China	Hard (i)	(South Korea) Choi Young-ja	(Chinese Taipei) Chan Chin-wei (Hong Kong) Tong Ka-po	3–6, 6–3, 1–6
Winner	7.	20 April 2003	Ho Chi Minh City, Vietnam	Hard	(South Korea) Kim Mi-ok	(Japan) Shiho Hisamatsu (Japan) Seiko Okamoto	6–1, 6–2
Winner	8.	15 June 2003	Seoul, South Korea	Hard	(South Korea) Kim Mi-ok	(Chinese Taipei) Chan Chin-wei (Chinese Taipei) Chuang Chia-jung	6–2, 4–6, 7–5
Winner	9.	27 July 2003	Changwon, South Korea	Hard	(South Korea) Kim Mi-ok	(Japan) Shizu Katsumi (Japan) Akiko Kinebuchi	6–3, 6–4
Winner	10.	30 May 2004	Seoul, South Korea	Hard	(South Korea) Kim Mi-ok	(Japan) Shiho Hisamatsu (Japan) Remi Tezuka	4–6, 6–1, 6–1
Runner-up	11.	26 June 2004	Inchon, South Korea	Hard	(South Korea) Kim Mi-ok	(Chinese Taipei) Chan Chin-wei (Chinese Taipei) Hsieh Su-wei	2–6, 0–6
Runner-up	12.	19 June 2005	Inchon, South Korea	Hard	(South Korea) Lee Ye-ra	(Chinese Taipei) Chan Chin-wei (Chinese Taipei) Hsieh Su-wei	2–6, 6–7^{(4)}
