= Jeon Mi-ra =

South Korean tennis player

Jeon Mi-ra 전미라
- Country (sports): South Korea
- Residence: Seoul, South Korea
- Born: 6 February 1978 (age 48) Gunsan, North Jeolla Province
- Height: 1.74 m (5 ft 8 1/2 in)
- Turned pro: 1993
- Retired: 2005
- Plays: Right (two-handed backhand)
- Prize money: $234,166

Singles
- Career record: 283–198
- Career titles: 0 WTA, 7 ITF
- Highest ranking: No. 129 (3 February 2003)

Grand Slam singles results
- Australian Open: Q2 (2004)
- French Open: Q1 (1998, 2003, 2005)
- Wimbledon: Q3 (1997, 2002, 2004)
- US Open: 1R (2002)

Doubles
- Career record: 176–114
- Career titles: 1 WTA, 12 ITF
- Highest ranking: No. 120 (18 October 2004)

Grand Slam doubles results
- Wimbledon: 1R (2004)

Team competitions
- Fed Cup: 8–5
Medal record
Representing South Korea
Summer Universiade
| Gold medal – first place | 1997 Catania | Mixed doubles |
| Bronze medal – third place | 1997 Catania | Women's singles |
Asian Games
| Bronze medal – third place | 2002 Busan | Team |

Jeon Mi-ra (Korean: 전미라, born 6 February 1978) is a South Korean former professional tennis player.

== Career ==
She was the runner-up in the 1994 Wimbledon Championships girls' singles tournament, losing to Martina Hingis, 5–7, 4–6. As a professional, she won one WTA Tour doubles title, and reached a career-high doubles ranking of No. 120, in October 2004. Her husband is Yoon Jong-shin.

Playing for South Korea in the Fed Cup, she has a win–loss record of 8–5 (6–3 in singles).

== Grand Slam performance timeline ==
Key
| W | F | SF | QF | #R | RR | Q# | DNQ | A | NH |

(W) winner; (F) finalist; (SF) semifinalist; (QF) quarterfinalist; (#R) rounds 4, 3, 2, 1; (RR) round-robin stage; (Q#) qualification round; (DNQ) did not qualify; (A) absent; (NH) not held; (SR) strike rate (events won / competed); (W–L) win–loss record.

=== Singles ===
| Tournament | 1997 | 1998 | ... | 2002 | 2003 | 2004 | 2005 | W–L |
|---|---|---|---|---|---|---|---|---|
| Australian Open | A | A | A | A | Q1 | Q2 | A | 0–0 |
| French Open | A | Q1 | A | A | Q1 | A | Q1 | 0–0 |
| Wimbledon | Q3 | A | A | Q3 | Q1 | Q3 | A | 0–0 |
| US Open | A | Q1 | A | 1R | Q1 | Q1 | A | 0–1 |
| Win–loss | 0–0 | 0–0 | 0–0 | 0–1 | 0–0 | 0–0 | 0–0 | 0–1 |

== WTA Tour finals ==
=== Doubles: 1 (title) ===
Legend
Tier I, II (0–0)
Tier III, IV & V (1–0)

| Result | Date | Tournament | Surface | Partner | Opponents | Score |
|---|---|---|---|---|---|---|
| Win | 3 October 2004 | Korea Open, South Korea | Hard | (South Korea) Cho Yoon-jeong | (Chinese Taipei) Chuang Chia-jung (Chinese Taipei) Hsieh Su-wei | 6–3, 1–6, 7–5 |

== ITF Circuit finals ==
=== Singles: 19 (7 titles, 12 runner-ups) ===
Legend
$50,000 tournaments
$25,000 tournaments
$10,000 tournaments

| Result | No. | Date | Tournament | Surface | Opponent | Score |
|---|---|---|---|---|---|---|
| Win | 1. | 13 June 1993 | ITF Seoul, South Korea | Hard | (South Korea) Kim Yeon-sook | 6–3, 1–6, 7–5 |
| Win | 2. | 12 September 1993 | ITF Taipei, Taiwan | Hard | (Chinese Taipei) Weng Tzu-ting | 1–6, 6–3, 7–5 |
| Loss | 3. | 28 November 1993 | ITF Bangkok, Thailand | Hard | (South Korea) Choi Young-ja | 6–2, 4–6, 3–6 |
| Loss | 4. | 13 December 1993 | ITF Manila, Philippines | Hard | (South Korea) Choi Ju-yeon | 2–6, 4–6 |
| Loss | 5. | 20 March 1995 | ITF Bandar, Brunei | Hard | (South Korea) Choi Ju-yeon | 4–6, 4–6 |
| Loss | 6. | 4 May 1997 | Kangaroo Cup, Japan | Grass | (Australia) Kerry-Anne Guse | 5–7, 5–7 |
| Win | 7. | 13 August 2000 | ITF Nonthaburi, Thailand | Hard | (South Korea) Choi Young-ja | 6–1, 6–3 |
| Loss | 8. | 20 August 2000 | ITF Nonthaburi, Thailand | Hard | (Thailand) Suchanun Viratprasert | 5–7, 6–1, 1–6 |
| Win | 9. | 17 September 2000 | ITF Osaka, Japan | Hard | (South Korea) Chang Kyung-mi | 7–6^{(4)}, 6–1 |
| Loss | 10. | 14 January 2001 | ITF Tallahassee, United States | Hard | (United States) Jacqueline Trail | 4–6, 4–6 |
| Win | 11. | 10 June 2001 | ITF Hilton Head, United States | Hard | (United States) Ansley Cargill | 7–6^{(4)}, 6–1 |
| Win | 12. | 24 June 2001 | ITF Easton, United States | Hard | (United States) Julie Ditty | 6–4, 7–6^{(4)} |
| Loss | 13. | 14 April 2002 | ITF Ho Chi Minh City, Vietnam | Hard | (China) Sun Tiantian | 3–6, 4–6 |
| Win | 14. | 30 July 2001 | ITF Seoul, South Korea | Clay | (Italy) Flavia Pennetta | 4–6, 6-4, 6-1 |
| Loss | 15. | 8 May 2002 | Fukuoka International, Japan | Grass | (Canada) Vanessa Webb | 0–6, 4–6 |
| Loss | 16. | 8 June 2003 | ITF Seoul, South Korea | Hard | (China) Xie Yanze | 3–6, 4–6 |
| Loss | 17. | 30 November 2003 | ITF Mount Gambier, Australia | Hard | (Netherlands) Elise Tamaëla | 7–5, 6–7^{(4)}, 1–6 |
| Loss | 18. | 2 May 2004 | Kangaroo Cup, Japan | Carpet | (Serbia) Ana Ivanovic | 4–6, 6–2, 5–7 |
| Loss | 19. | 1 August 2004 | Lexington Challenger, United States | Hard | (France) Camille Pin | 5–7, 3–6 |

=== Doubles: 26 (12 titles, 14 runner-ups) ===
| Result | No. | Date | Tournament | Surface | Partner | Opponents | Score |
|---|---|---|---|---|---|---|---|
| Loss | 1. | 12 September 1993 | Taipei, Taiwan | Hard | (South Korea) Paek Jeong-hee | (South Korea) Chang Dong-mi (South Korea) Kim Hye-jeong | 3–6, 5–7 |
| Loss | 2. | 13 December 1993 | Manila, Philippines | Hard | (South Korea) Choi Ju-yeon | (Japan) Atsuko Shintani (Japan) Haruko Shigekawa | 4–6, 2–6 |
| Loss | 3. | 16 May 1994 | Beijing, China | Hard | (South Korea) Yoo Kyung-sook | (South Korea) Choi Young-ja (South Korea) Choi Ju-yeon | 2–6, 3–6 |
| Loss | 4. | 11 August 1996 | Tarakan, Indonesia | Hard | (Thailand) Benjamas Sangaram | (Australia) Annabel Ellwood (Australia) Kerry-Anne Guse | 3–6, 2–6 |
| Loss | 5. | 23 March 1997 | Noda, Japan | Hard | (South Korea) Choi Young-ja | (Japan) Yuko Hosoki (Japan) Keiko Nagatomi | 2–6, 2–6 |
| Loss | 6. | 16 July 2000 | Jakarta, Indonesia | Hard | (South Korea) Chae Kyung-yee | (Indonesia) Irawati Iskandar (Indonesia) Wukirasih Sawondari | w/o |
| Win | 7. | 16 July 2000 | Jakarta, Indonesia | Hard | (Indonesia) Wukirasih Sawondari | (South Korea) Choi Jin-young (Japan) Akiko Kinebuchi | 3–6, 7–5, 7–6^{(4)} |
| Win | 8. | 13 August 2000 | Nonthabuiri, Thailand | Hard | (South Korea) Chae Kyung-yee | (South Korea) Choi Young-ja (South Korea) Kim Eun-sook | 6–3, 6–2 |
| Loss | 9. | 20 August 2000 | Nonthabuiri, Thailand | Hard | (South Korea) Chae Kyung-yee | (South Korea) Choi Young-ja (South Korea) Kim Eun-sook | 6–1, 1–6, 1–6 |
| Win | 10. | 10 September 2000 | Ibaraki, Japan | Hard | (Japan) Shiho Hisamatsu | (South Korea) Chang Kyung-mi (South Korea) Chae Kyung-yee | 6–3, 6–3 |
| Loss | 11. | 17 September 2000 | Osaka, Japan | Hard | (Japan) Shiho Hisamatsu | (United States) Amanda Augustus (Australia) Amy Jensen | 3–6, 2–6 |
| Win | 12. | 24 September 2000 | Kyoto, Japan | Carpet (i) | (South Korea) Shiho Hisamatsu | (South Korea) Chang Kyung-mi (South Korea) Chae Kyung-yee | 7–6^{(4)}, 7–5 |
| Loss | 13. | 28 October 2000 | Seoul, South Korea | Hard | (South Korea) Cho Yoon-jeong | (South Africa) Surina De Beer (Germany) Marlene Weingärtner | 2–4, 1–4, 4–1 |
| Win | 14. | 26 March 2001 | Stone Mountain, United States | Hard | (Japan) Rika Fujiwara | (Australia) Alicia Molik (Australia) Bryanne Stewart | 7–5, 6–3 |
| Loss | 15. | 10 June 2001 | Hilton Head, United States | Hard | (South Korea) Choi Young-ja | (United States) Kristy Blumberg (United States) Karin Miller | 4–6, 6–7^{(1)} |
| Win | 16. | 17 June 2001 | Mount Pleasant, United States | Hard | (South Korea) Choi Young-ja | (United States) Jane Chi (Russia) Lioudmila Skavronskaia | 6–7^{(2)}, 6–2, 6–2 |
| Win | 17. | 24 June 2001 | Easton, United States | Hard | (South Korea) Choi Young-ja | (United States) Kristy Blumberg (United States) Karin Miller | 6–1, 6–1 |
| Loss | 18. | 18 November 2001 | Port Pirie, Australia | Hard | (South Korea) Kim Eun-ha | (Australia) Lisa McShea (Australia) Trudi Musgrave | 5–7, 4–6 |
| Loss | 19. | 3 December 2001 | Nonthaburi, Thailand | Hard | (India) Manisha Malhotra | (Croatia) Ivana Abramović (South Korea) Kim Jin-hee | 1–6, 5–7 |
| Win | 20. | 8 June 2003 | Seoul, South Korea | Hard | (Japan) Shiho Hisamatsu | (Malaysia) Khoo Chin-bee (Japan) Tomoko Yonemura | 6–3, 6–1 |
| Win | 21. | 19 October 2003 | Haibara, Japan | Carpet | (Japan) Shiho Hisamatsu | (Japan) Tomoko Yonemura (Japan) Ayami Takase | 6–2, 5–7, 6–3 |
| Loss | 22. | 2 November 2003 | Beijing, China | Hard | (Japan) Seiko Okamoto | (China) Yang Shujing (China) Yu Ying | 4–6, 2–6 |
| Win | 23. | 2 May 2004 | Kangaroo Cup, Japan | Carpet | (South Korea) Cho Yoon-jeong | (Chinese Taipei) Chuang Chia-jung (Indonesia) Wynne Prakusya | 7–6^{(4)}, 6–2 |
| Win | 24. | 10 May 2004 | Karuizawa, Japan | Carpet | (Japan) Rika Fujiwara | (Japan) Ryōko Fuda (Japan) Seiko Okamoto | 6–2, 2–6, 7–6^{(1)} |
| Win | 25. | 14 August 2005 | Wuxi, China | Hard | (Indonesia) Wynne Prakusya | (Australia) Casey Dellacqua (Australia) Sophie Ferguson | 6–2, 7–6^{(6)} |
| Loss | 26. | 25 September 2005 | Ibaraki, Japan | Hard | (Japan) Ayami Takase | (Japan) Ryoko Takemura (Japan) Tomoko Yonemura | 2–6, 4–6 |
