= Chae Kyung-yee =

South Korean tennis player

- Country (sports): South Korea
- Born: 2 October 1980 (age 44)
- Prize money: $73,292

Singles
- Career record: 216–157
- Career titles: 5 ITF
- Highest ranking: No. 269 (21 May 2001)

Doubles
- Career record: 158–152
- Career titles: 8 ITF
- Highest ranking: No. 211 (27 September 1999)

Chae Kyung-yee (born 2 October 1980) is a South Korean former professional tennis player.

Chae spent most her professional career competing on the ITF Circuit, reaching a best singles ranking by the WTA of 269 in the world. As a doubles player, she won eight titles on the ITF Circuit, including a $50,000 tournament in Gifu in 1999.

From 2000 to 2001, Chae played in eight Fed Cup ties for South Korea, for a 7–6 overall win–loss record.

== ITF Circuit finals ==
Legend
$50,000 tournaments
$25,000 tournaments
$10,000 tournaments

=== Singles: 13 (5–8) ===
Result	No.	Date	Tournament	Surface	Opponent	Score
Win	1.	27 February 2000	ITF Jakarta, Indonesia	Hard	(South Korea) Choi Young-ja	1–6, 6–3, 6–1
Loss	2.	16 July 2000	ITF Jakarta, Indonesia	Hard	(South Korea) Choi Jin-young	w/o
Win	3.	23 July 2000	ITF Jakarta, Indonesia	Hard	(Japan) Sachie Umehara	6–0, 6–0
Win	4.	5 November 2000	ITF Jakarta, Indonesia	Hard	(Indonesia) Romana Tedjakusuma	5–4^{(5)}, 4–1, 1–4, 4–1
Loss	5.	12 November 2000	ITF Bandung, Indonesia	Hard	(Indonesia) Romana Tedjakusuma	4–2, 3–5, 2–4, 5–4^{(4)}, 1–4
Loss	6.	20 November 2000	ITF Manila, Philippines	Clay	(Spain) Alicia Ortuño	3–5, 2–4
Loss	7.	21 July 2002	ITF Seoul, South Korea	Hard	(South Korea) Chang Kyung-mi	6–4, 3–6, 1–6
Loss	8.	1 September 2007	ITF New Delhi, India	Hard	(India) Tara Iyer	5–7, 2–6
Win	9.	13 July 2008	ITF Tokyo, Japan	Carpet	(Japan) Yumi Miyazaki	6–3, 1–6, 6–3
Loss	10.	20 July 2008	ITF Miyazaki, Japan	Carpet	(Japan) Kimiko Date	3–6, 2–6
Loss	11.	31 August 2008	ITF Gimhae, South Korea	Hard	(South Korea) Lee Jin-a	4–6, 1–6
Win	12.	13 September 2008	ITF Go Yang, South Korea	Hard	(South Korea) Lee Jin-a	6–4, 6–4
Loss	13.	29 March 2009	ITF Wellington, New Zealand	Hard	(South Korea) Kim So-jung	6–4, 3–6, 5–7

=== Doubles: 29 (8–21) ===
Result	No.	Date	Tournament	Surface	Partner	Opponents	Score
Loss	1.	18 April 1999	ITF Jakar, Indonesia	Hard	(Indonesia) Wukirasih Sawondari	(Indonesia) Liza Andriyani (Indonesia) Irawati Iskandar	4–6, 4–6
Win	2.	2 May 1999	ITF Gifu, Japan	Carpet	(South Korea) Cho Yoon-jeong	(Japan) Shiho Hisamatsu (Japan) Nana Miyagi	6–2, 4–6, 6–2
Loss	3.	6 June 1999	ITF Little Rock, United States	Hard	(South Korea) Chang Kyung-mi	(Japan) Seiko Okamoto (Japan) Keiko Taguchi	5–7, 2–6
Loss	4.	4 July 1999	ITF Springfield, United States	Hard	(United States) Jennifer Hopkins	(United States) Michelle Dasso (United States) Jennifer Hall	6–7, 1–6
Loss	5.	6 March 2000	ITF Haikou, China	Hard	(Japan) Ryoko Takemura	(Hungary) Gréta Arn (United Kingdom) Julie Pullin	5–7, 4–6
Loss	6.	26 March 2000	ITF Nanjing, China	Hard	(Japan) Ryoko Takemura	(China) Li Na (China) Li Ting	6–7^{(4)}, 1–6
Win	7.	11 June 2000	ITF Incheon, South Korea	Hard	(South Korea) Chang Kyung-mi	(South Korea) Chung Yang-jin (South Korea) Lee Eun-jeong	6–3, 4–6, 7–5
Loss	8.	18 June 2000	ITF Seoul, South Korea	Hard	(South Korea) Chang Kyung-mi	(South Korea) Choi Young-ja (South Korea) Kim Eun-sook	0–6, 0–6
Loss	9.	16 July 2000	ITF Jakarta, Indonesia	Hard	(South Korea) Jeon Mi-ra	(Indonesia) Irawati Iskandar (Indonesia) Wukirasih Sawondari	w/o
Win	10.	13 August 2000	ITF Nonthabuiri, Thailand	Hard	(South Korea) Jeon Mi-ra	(South Korea) Choi Young-ja (South Korea) Kim Eun-sook	6–3, 6–2
Loss	11.	20 August 2000	ITF Nonthabuiri, Thailand	Hard	(South Korea) Jeon Mi-ra	(South Korea) Choi Young-ja (South Korea) Kim Eun-sook	6–1, 1–6, 1–6
Loss	12.	3 September 2000	ITF Kugayama, Japan	Hard	(South Korea) Chang Kyung-mi	(Chinese Taipei) Chen Yu-an (Hong Kong) Tong Ka-po	3–6, 1–6
Loss	13.	10 September 2000	ITF Ibaraki, Japan	Hard	(South Korea) Chang Kyung-mi	(Japan) Shiho Hisamatsu (South Korea) Jeon Mi-ra	3–6, 3–6
Loss	14.	24 September 2000	ITF Kyoto, Japan	Hard	(South Korea) Chang Kyung-mi	(Japan) Shiho Hisamatsu (South Korea) Jeon Mi-ra	6–7^{(4)}, 5–7
Loss	15.	5 November 2000	ITF Jakarta, Indonesia	Hard	(South Korea) Kim Jin-hee	(Indonesia) Liza Andriyani (Indonesia) Angelique Widjaja	4–2, 3–5, 2–4, 4–0, 0–4
Win	16.	19 November 2000	ITF Manila, Philippines	Clay	(South Korea) Kim Jin-hee	(Germany) Catherine Turinsky (Netherlands) Andrea van den Hurk	4–2, 4–2, 4–0
Loss	17.	18 March 2001	ITF Kao-Hsiung, Taiwan	Hard	(South Korea) Kim Jin-hee	(Indonesia) Dea Sumantri (Indonesia) Angelique Widjaja	3–6, 2–6
Loss	18.	12 August 2001	ITF Bangkok, Thailand	Hard	(South Korea) Kim Jin-hee	(Chinese Taipei) Chan Chin-wei (Chinese Taipei) Hsieh Su-wei	1–6, 3–6
Loss	19.	19 August 2001	ITF Bangkok, Thailand	Hard	(South Korea) Kim Jin-hee	(Indonesia) Romana Tedjakusuma (Indonesia) Angelique Widjaja	6–4, 3–6, 5–7
Loss	20.	21 July 2002	ITF Seoul, South Korea	Hard	(South Korea) Chang Kyung-mi	(Japan) Maki Arai (Japan) Seiko Okamoto	3–6, 7–5, 4–6
Win	21.	17 July 2005	ITF Seogwipo, South Korea	Hard	(South Korea) Yoo Mi	(South Korea) Chang Kyung-mi (South Korea) Kim Mi-ok	6–2, 6–1
Loss	22.	27 October 2007	ITF Hamamatsu, Japan	Carpet	(Japan) Mitsuko Ise	(China) Liu Wanting (China) Lu Jingjing	1–6, 2–6
Win	23.	13 July 2008	ITF Tokyo, Japan	Carpet	(South Korea) Chang Kyung-mi	(Japan) Ayumi Oka (Thailand) Varatchaya Wongteanchai	3–6, 6–2, [10–7]
Win	24.	6 September 2008	ITF Go Yang, South Korea	Hard	(South Korea) Chang Kyung-mi	(South Korea) Kim So-jung (Japan) Ayaka Maekawa	7–5, 3–6, [10–5]
Win	25.	13 September 2008	ITF Go Yang, South Korea	Hard	(South Korea) Chang Kyung-mi	(South Korea) Cho Jeong-a (South Korea) Kim Ji-young	6–3, 4–6, [10–8]
Loss	26.	13 October 2008	ITF Makinohara, Japan	Carpet	(China) Han Xinyun	(Japan) Natsumi Hamamura (Japan) Junri Namigata	5–7, 6–7^{(4)}
Loss	27.	29 March 2009	ITF Wellington, New Zealand	Carpet	(South Korea) Kim Hae-sung	(South Korea) Kim So-jung (Japan) Ayaka Maekawa	4–6, 4–6
Loss	28.	14 September 2009	ITF New Delhi, India	Hard	(South Korea) Shin Jung-yoon	(Japan) Moe Kawatoko (Japan) Miki Miyamura	6–2, 2–6, [6–10]
Loss	29.	20 August 2011	ITF Taipei, Taiwan	Hard	(South Korea) Kim Hae-sung	(Japan) Miyabi Inoue (Japan) Mari Tanaka	5–7, 6–2, [7–10]
