= Shiho Hisamatsu =

Japanese tennis player (born 1979)

- Country (sports): Japan
- Born: 4 July 1979 (age 45); Kagoshima
- Turned pro: 1996
- Plays: Right-handed (two-handed backhand)
- Prize money: $263,689

Singles
- Career record: 363–388
- Career titles: 7 ITF
- Highest ranking: No. 143 (6 November 2006)

Grand Slam singles results
- Australian Open: Q3 (2006)
- French Open: Q1 (2005, 2006)
- Wimbledon: Q2 (2005)
- US Open: Q2 (2004, 2006)

Doubles
- Career record: 148–148
- Career titles: 9 ITF
- Highest ranking: No. 185 (7 June 2004)

Shiho Hisamatsu (Japanese: 久松志保, born 4 July 1979) is a Japanese former tennis player.

Hisamatsu won seven singles titles and nine doubles titles on the ITF Circuit. She reached career-high rankings by the WTA of 143 in singles and 185 in doubles.

In 2019, Hisamatsu only played six matches (five in singles, one win) on the pro circuit. Since December 2019, she has not been playing any more.

== ITF Circuit finals ==
Legend
$100,000 tournaments
$75,000 tournaments
$50,000 tournaments
$25,000 tournaments
$10,000 tournaments

=== Singles: 16 (7 titles, 9 runner-ups) ===
Result	No.	Date	Tournament	Surface	Opponent	Score
Loss	1.	9 May 1999	ITF Seoul, South Korea	Clay	(Uzbekistan) Iroda Tulyaganova	2–6, 2–6
Win	1.	10 September 2000	ITF Ibaraki, Japan	Hard	(South Korea) Chang Kyung-mi	7–5, 6–7^{(3–7)}, 6–2
Loss	2.	24 September 2000	ITF Kyoto, Japan	Carpet (i)	(South Korea) Chang Kyung-mi	2–6, 7–5, 2–6
Win	2.	9 September 2001	ITF Kugayama, Japan	Hard	(Australia) Samantha Stosur	7–6^{(7–4)}, 6–3
Win	3.	25 August 2002	ITF Kyoto, Japan	Hard (i)	(Japan) Maika Ozaki	3–6, 6–1, 6–3
Win	4.	15 September 2002	ITF Kyoto, Japan	Hard (i)	(Australia) Adriana Szili	2–6, 6–3, 6–3
Win	5.	22 September 2002	ITF Kyoto, Japan	Hard (i)	(Australia) Adriana Szili	7–5, 7–5
Loss	3.	20 April 2003	ITF Ho Chi Minh City, Vietnam	Hard	(Japan) Yuka Yoshida	3–6, 7–5, 2–6
Loss	4.	7 September 2002	ITF Ibaraki, Japan	Hard	(Japan) Rika Fujiwara	6–4, 5–7, 0–6
Loss	5.	10 April 2005	ITF Coatzacoalcos, Mexico	Hard	(Austria) Yvonne Meusburger	6–3, 4–6, 3–6
Loss	6.	8 May 2005	ITF Gifu, Japan	Hard	(Japan) Saori Obata	1–6, 6–2, 4–6
Loss	7.	6 November 2005	ITF Sutama, Japan	Clay	(Russia) Alisa Kleybanova	3–6, 5–7
Loss	8.	9 July 2006	ITF Nagoya, Japan	Hard	(Japan) Erika Takao	6–4, 2–6, 0–6
Win	6.	24 September 2006	ITF Ibaraki, Japan	Hard	(Japan) Akiko Yonemura	6–2, 3–6, 7–5
Win	7.	29 October 2006	ITF Hamanako, Japan	Carpet	(Japan) Seiko Okamoto	6–2, 6–4
Loss	9.	13 September 2009	ITF Noto, Japan	Carpet	(Czech Republic) Karolína Plíšková	6–3, 6–7^{(2–7)}, 6–7^{(9–11)}

=== Doubles: 20 (9 titles, 11 runner-ups) ===
Result	No.	Date	Tournament	Surface	Partner	Opponents	Score
Loss	1.	5 October 1997	ITF Kyoto, Japan	Carpet (i)	(Australia) Amanda Grahame	(Japan) Saori Honda (Japan) Aiko Matsuda	6–2, 1–6, 3–6
Loss	2.	2 May 1999	ITF Gifu, Japan	Carpet	(Japan) Nana Smith	(South Korea) Chae Kyung-yee (South Korea) Cho Yoon-jeong	2–6, 6–4, 2–6
Win	1.	10 September 2000	ITF Ibaraki, Japan	Hard	(South Korea) Jeon Mi-ra	(South Korea) Chae Kyung-yee (South Korea) Chang Kyung-mi	6–3, 6–3
Loss	3.	17 September 2000	ITF Osaka, Japan	Hard	(South Korea) Jeon Mi-ra	(United States) Amanda Augustus (Australia) Amy Jensen	3–6, 2–6
Win	2.	24 September 2000	ITF Kyoto, Japan	Carpet (i)	(South Korea) Jeon Mi-ra	(South Korea) Chae Kyung-yee (South Korea) Chang Kyung-mi	7–6^{(7–4)}, 7–5
Loss	4.	14 October 2001	ITF Saga, Japan	Grass	(Japan) Maiko Inoue	(Japan) Rika Hiraki (Japan) Nana Smith	0–6, 1–6
Win	3.	15 September 2002	ITF Kyoto, Japan	Hard (i)	(Japan) Maiko Inoue	(Japan) Maki Arai (Japan) Kaori Aoyama	7–5, 7–5
Loss	5.	22 September 2002	ITF Kyoto, Japan	Hard (i)	(Japan) Maiko Inoue	(Japan) Shizu Katsumi (Japan) Akiko Kinebuchi	4–6, 6–2, 2–6
Loss	6.	20 April 2003	ITF Ho Chi Minh City, Vietnam	Hard	(Japan) Seiko Okamoto	(South Korea) Choi Jin-young (South Korea) Kim Mi-ok	1–6, 2–6
Win	4.	8 June 2003	ITF Seoul, South Korea	Hard	(South Korea) Jeon Mi-ra	(Malaysia) Khoo Chin-bee (Japan) Tomoko Yonemura	6–3, 6–1
Win	5.	6 July 2003	ITF Los Gatos, United States	Hard	(Japan) Yuka Yoshida	(United States) Tanner Cochran (United States) Shenay Perry	6–4, 3–6, 6–2
Win	6.	19 October 2003	ITF Haibara, Japan	Carpet	(South Korea) Jeon Mi-ra	(Japan) Tomoko Yonemura (Japan) Ayami Takase	6–2, 5–7, 6–3
Loss	7.	30 May 2004	ITF Seoul, South Korea	Hard	(Japan) Remi Tezuka	(South Korea) Choi Jin-young (South Korea) Kim Mi-ok	6–4, 1–6, 1–6
Win	7.	11 July 2004	ITF College Park, United States	Hard	(Japan) Seiko Okamoto	(Belarus) Natallia Dziamidzenka (United States) Kaysie Smashey	7–6^{(7–5)}, 6–2
Loss	8.	7 September 2002	ITF Ibaraki, Japan	Hard	(Japan) Rika Fujiwara	(Japan) Remi Tezuka (Japan) Maki Arai	1–6, 7–5, 2–6
Loss	9.	1 May 2005	ITF Hamanako, Japan	Hard	(Japan) Ayami Takase	(Japan) Ryōko Fuda (Japan) Seiko Okamoto	5–7, 4–6
Win	8.	9 July 2006	ITF Nagoya, Japan	Hard	(Chinese Taipei) Chuang Chia-jung	(Japan) Ayami Takase (Japan) Seiko Okamoto	6–2, 6–3
Loss	10.	6 August 2006	ITF Tokachi, Japan	Carpet	(Japan) Remi Tezuka	(Japan) Kumiko Iijima (Japan) Junri Namigata	5–7, 4–6
Winner	9.	5 August 2008	ITF Obihiro, Japan	Hard	(Japan) Mari Tanaka	(Japan) Miki Miyamura (Japan) Tomoyo Takagishi	6–4, 6–2
Loss	11.	26 March 2010	ITF Kofu, Japan	Hard	(Japan) Maiko Inoue	(Japan) Maki Arai (Japan) Seiko Okamoto	4–6, 4–6
