= Lee Jin-a =

South Korean tennis player

- Country (sports): South Korea
- Residence: Cheolwon, South Korea
- Born: 10 March 1985 (age 40)
- Height: 1.70 m (5 ft 7 in)
- Plays: Left (two-handed backhand)
- Prize money: $93,484

Singles
- Career record: 198–85
- Career titles: 11 ITF
- Highest ranking: No. 158 (13 December 2010)

Grand Slam singles results
- Australian Open: Q1 (2011)
- French Open: Q1 (2011)
- US Open: Q1 (2010)

Doubles
- Career record: 113–54
- Career titles: 15 ITF
- Highest ranking: No. 197 (28 February 2011)

- Lee Jin-a
- Hangul: 이진아
- RR: I Jina
- MR: I China

Lee Jin-a (born 10 March 1985) is a South Korean former professional tennis player.

In December 2010, she reached a career-high singles ranking of world No. 158. On 28 February 2011, she peaked at No. 197 in the WTA doubles rankings.

Lee started playing tennis at the age of 11. In her career, she won 11 singles titles and 15 doubles titles on the ITF Women's Circuit.

Playing for South Korea Fed Cup team, Lee has a win–loss record of 11–7.

== ITF Circuit finals ==
Legend
$25,000 tournaments
$10,000 tournaments

=== Singles: 20 (11 titles, 9 runner-ups) ===
Result	No.	Date	Tournament	Surface	Opponent	Score
Loss	1.	28 May 2006	ITF Seogwipo, South Korea	Hard	(South Korea) Yoo Mi	5–7, 2–6
Win	1.	6 August 2006	ITF Bangkok, Thailand	Hard	(Netherlands) Selma Andrade	6–3, 6–3
Win	2.	27 May 2007	ITF Gimhae, South Korea	Clay	(South Korea) Lee Cho-won	6–2, 6–1
Win	3.	3 June 2007	ITF Gimhae, South Korea	Clay	(South Korea) Chang Kyung-mi	6–3, 6–3
Loss	2.	25 May 2008	ITF Nagano, Japan	Carpet	(Japan) Erika Takao	4–6, 1–6
Win	4.	31 August 2008	ITF Gimhae, South Korea	Hard	(South Korea) Chae Kyung-yee	6–4, 6–1
Loss	3.	13 September 2008	ITF Goyang, South Korea	Hard	(South Korea) Chae Kyung-yee	6–4, 6–1
Win	5.	3 May 2009	ITF Gimcheon, South Korea	Hard	(South Korea) Kim So-jung	6–4, 7–5
Loss	4.	31 May 2009	ITF Goyang, South Korea	Hard	(China) Han Xinyun	5–7, 4–6
Win	6.	5 July 2009	ITF Gimcheon, South Korea	Hard	(South Korea) Kim Ji-sun	6–2, 6–0
Loss	5.	12 July 2009	ITF Sunchang, South Korea	Hard	(South Korea) Kim Na-ri	7–6^{(6)}, 5–7, ret.
Win	7.	11 April 2010	Incheon Open, South Korea	Hard	(Romania) Irina-Camelia Begu	6–4, 6–2
Win	8.	25 April 2010	ITF Changwon, South Korea	Hard	(China) Xu Yifan	3–6, 6–4, 6–2
Loss	6.	30 May 2010	ITF Goyang, South Korea	Hard	(South Korea) Kim Na-ri	4–6, 4–6
Win	9.	12 June 2010	ITF Qarshi, Uzbekistan	Hard	(Uzbekistan) Sabina Sharipova	6–2, 1–6, 6–4
Loss	7.	11 July 2010	ITF Fuzhou, China	Hard	(Chinese Taipei) Chan Yung-jan	2–6, 4–6
Loss	8.	17 April 2011	Incheon Open, South Korea	Hard	(South Korea) Kim So-jung	6–2, 3–6, 1–6
Win	10.	3 February 2013	ITF Antalya, Turkey	Clay	(Russia) Yana Buchina	7–5, 6–3
Loss	9.	31 March 2013	ITF Nishitama, Japan	Hard	(South Korea) Yoo Mi	6–1, 1–6, 2–6
Win	11.	7 September 2014	ITF Yeongwol, South Korea	Hard	(Australia) Olivia Tjandramulia	6–2, 6–2

=== Doubles: 21 (15 titles, 6 runner-ups) ===
Outcome	No.	Date	Tournament	Surface	Partner	Opponents	Score
Winner	1.	3 July 2004	ITF Inchon, South Korea	Hard	(South Korea) Yoo Soo-mi	(Japan) Maki Arai (Japan) Remi Tezuka	6–2, 4–6, 6–4
Winner	2.	11 July 2004	ITF Seoul, South Korea	Hard	(South Korea) Kim Mi-ok	(Chinese Taipei) Chan Chin-wei (Chinese Taipei) Chen Yi	6–4, 6–4
Runner-up	1.	13 November 2005	ITF Manila, Philippines	Hard	(South Korea) Lim Sae-mi	(Chinese Taipei) Chen Yi (Chinese Taipei) Kao Shao-yuan	4–6, 1–6
Winner	3.	28 May 2006	ITF Daegu, South Korea	Hard	(South Korea) Yoo Mi	(South Korea) Chang Kyung-mi (South Korea) Kim Mi-ok	4–6, 6–4, 6–2
Winner	4.	28 May 2006	ITF Seogwipo, South Korea	Hard	(South Korea) Yoo Mi	(South Korea) Cho Jeong-a (South Korea) Kim Ji-young	6–3, 6–2
Runner-up	2.	18 June 2006	Incheon Open, South Korea	Hard	(South Korea) Yoo Mi	(Chinese Taipei) Chuang Chia-jung (Thailand) Napaporn Tongsalee	2–6, 4–6
Winner	5.	6 August 2006	ITF Bangkok, Thailand	Hard	(Thailand) Pichittra Thongdach	(Thailand) Uthumporn Pudtra (Hong Kong) Yang Zi-jun	6–2, 6–1
Runner-up	3.	5 May 2007	Incheon Open, South Korea	Hard	(South Korea) Yoo Mi	(United States) Tetiana Luzhanska (Indonesia) Romana Tedjakusuma	1–6, 4–6
Winner	6.	27 May 2007	ITF Gimhae, South Korea	Clay	(South Korea) Chang Kyung-mi	(Japan) Yuka Kuroda (Japan) Eriko Mizuno	6–1, 6–4
Winner	7.	3 June 2007	ITF Gimhae, South Korea	Clay	(South Korea) Chang Kyung-mi	(South Korea) Kim Sun-jung (South Korea) Lee Cho-won	6–4, 6–1
Runner-up	4.	27 April 2008	Incheon Open, South Korea	Hard	(South Korea) Chang Kyung-mi	(Chinese Taipei) Chan Chin-wei (Australia) Jarmila Gajdošová	6–1, 1–6, [5–10]
Winner	8.	11 May 2008	ITF Changwon, South Korea	Hard	(South Korea) Chang Kyung-mi	(South Korea) Cho Yoon-jeong (South Korea) Kim Jin-hee	7–5, 6–2
Runner-up	5.	3 May 2009	ITF Gimcheon, South Korea	Hard	(South Korea) Chang Kyung-mi	(Chinese Taipei) Chang Kai-chen (Chinese Taipei) Chen Yi	1–6, 5–7
Winner	9.	4 July 2009	ITF Gimcheon, South Korea	Hard	(South Korea) Chang Kyung-mi	(South Korea) Kim Kun-hee (South Korea) Yu Min-hwa	6–1, 6–2
Winner	10.	17 April 2010	ITF Gimhae, South Korea	Hard	(South Korea) Chang Kyung-mi	(Japan) Misaki Doi (Japan) Junri Namigata	1–6, 6–4, [10–8]
Winner	11.	24 April 2010	ITF Changwon, South Korea	Hard	(South Korea) Chang Kyung-mi	(Japan) Misaki Doi (Japan) Junri Namigata	5–7, 6–3, [10–8]
Winner	12.	1 May 2010	ITF Gimcheon, South Korea	Hard	(South Korea) Chang Kyung-mi	(South Korea) Kim Kun-hee (South Korea) Yu Min-hwa	7–5, 6–3
Runner-up	6.	29 May 2010	ITF Goyang, South Korea	Hard	(South Korea) Chang Kyung-mi	(South Korea) Kim Kun-hee (South Korea) Yu Min-hwa	4–6, 4–6
Winner	13.	19 January 2013	ITF Antalya, Turkey	Clay	(South Korea) Yoo Mi	(Belgium) Elyne Boeykens (Netherlands) Kelly Versteeg	6–3, 6–4
Winner	14.	26 January 2013	ITF Antalya, Turkey	Clay	(South Korea) Yoo Mi	(Serbia) Natalija Kostić (Italy) Gaia Sanesi	6–3, 6–1
Winner	15.	2 February 2013	ITF Antalya, Turkey	Clay	(South Korea) Han Na-lae	(Spain) Eva Fernández Brugués (Bulgaria) Isabella Shinikova	6–3, 6–3
