= 2001 Fed Cup Asia/Oceania Zone Group II – play-offs =

International tennis competition play-offs

The play-offs of the 2001 Fed Cup Asia/Oceania Zone Group II were the final stages of the Group II Zonal Competition involving teams from Asia and Oceania. Using the positions determined in their pools, the eight teams faced off to determine their overall placing in the 2001 Fed Cup Asia/Oceania Zone Group II. The top two teams advanced to Group I for 2002.

Placing	Pool A	Pool B
1	Hong Kong	Philippines
2	Singapore	Malaysia
3	Fiji	Sri Lanka
4		Syria

== Draw ==
Play-offs
Malaysia	3
Singapore	0

First round
Hong Kong	2
Malaysia	1
Singapore	0
Philippines	3

Second round
Hong Kong	0
Philippines	3

Play-offs
Fiji	1
Syria	2

First round
Fiji	1
Sri Lanka	2

=== First round ===
==== Hong Kong vs. Malaysia ====
Hong Kong
2
Kaohsiung, Taiwan
12 April 2001
Rebound Ace (outdoors)

Malaysia
1

			1	2	3
1	(Hong Kong) (Malaysia)	Lam Po Kuen; Lai Shareen-Rena	6; 3	6^{5} 7^{7}	6; 2
2	(Hong Kong) (Malaysia)	Tong Ka-po; Liaw Chen-Yee	6; 0	6; 0
3	(Hong Kong) (Malaysia)	Lam Po Kuen / Lin Su-Chen; Lai Shareen-Rena / Liaw Chen-Yee	1; 4			retired

==== Singapore vs. Philippines ====
Singapore
0
Kaohsiung, Taiwan
12 April 2001
Rebound Ace (outdoors)

Philippines
3

			1	2	3
1	(Singapore) (Philippines)	Agustine Limanto; Czarina-Mae Arévalo	6; 4	6^{8} 7^{10}	1; 6
2	(Singapore) (Philippines)	Leow Yik-Hui; Jennifer Saret	1; 6	4; 6
3	(Singapore) (Philippines)	Tina Jacob / Sonya Kumar; Vida Lina Alpuerto / Czarina-Mae Arévalo	6; 4	3; 6	3; 6

==== Fiji vs. Sri Lanka ====
Fiji
1
Kaohsiung, Taiwan
12 April 2001
Rebound Ace (outdoors)

Sri Lanka
2

			1	2	3
1	(Fiji) (Sri Lanka)	Adriana Thaggard; Shalini Perera	4; 6	6; 1	2; 6
2	(Fiji) (Sri Lanka)	Archana Reddy; Mahesha Seneviratne	7; 5	6; 3
3	(Fiji) (Sri Lanka)	Archana Reddy / Adriana Thaggard; Sobhini De Silva / Shalini Perera	6; 4	1; 6	5; 7

=== Repechage Round ===
==== Malaysia vs. Singapore ====
Malaysia
3
Kaohsiung, Taiwan
13 April 2001
Rebound Ace (outdoors)

Singapore
0

			1	2	3
1	(Malaysia) (Singapore)	Lai Shareen-Rena; Sonya Kumar	6; 0	6; 2
2	(Malaysia) (Singapore)	Liaw Chen-Yee; Tina Jacob	6; 0	6; 0
3	(Malaysia) (Singapore)	Lai Shareen-Rena / Liaw Chen-Yee; Leow Yik-Hui / Agustine Limanto	6; 2	5; 7	6; 4

==== Fiji vs. Syria ====
Fiji
1
Kaohsiung, Taiwan
13 April 2001
Rebound Ace (outdoors)

Syria
2

			1	2	3
1	(Fiji) (Syria)	Petroena Fong; Shaza Tinawi	3; 6	6; 4	2; 6
2	(Fiji) (Syria)	Adriana Thaggard; Farah Dayoub	6; 3	6; 4
3	(Fiji) (Syria)	Hamidan Bibi / Adriana Thaggard; Farah Dayoub / Shaza Tinawi	0; 6	0; 6

=== Second round ===
==== Hong Kong vs. Philippines ====
Hong Kong
0
Kaohsiung, Taiwan
13 April 2001
Rebound Ace (outdoors)

Philippines
3

			1	2	3
1	(Hong Kong) (Philippines)	Lin Su-Chen; Czarina-Mae Arévalo	6^{4} 7^{7}	6; 4	2; 6
2	(Hong Kong) (Philippines)	Lam Po Kuen; Jennifer Saret	6; 4	1; 6	3; 6
3	(Hong Kong) (Philippines)	Lam Po Kuen / Lin Su-Chen; Czarina-Mae Arévalo / Jennifer Saret	0; 6	0; 6

== Final Placements ==
Placing	Teams
First	Philippines
Second	Hong Kong
Third	Malaysia
Fourth	Philippines
Fifth	Sri Lanka
Sixth	Syria
Seventh	Fiji

- Philippines and Hong Kong advanced to Group I for next year, where they respectively placed last and fourth in the same pool of six. Philippines, thus, was relegated back down to Group II for 2003.

== See also ==
- Fed Cup structure
