= 1999 Fed Cup Asia/Oceania Zone =

Subsection of tennis competition

The Asia/Oceania Zone was one of three zones of regional competition in the 1999 Fed Cup.

== Group I ==
- Venue: Thana City Golf Club, Samutpakarn, Thailand (outdoor hard)
- Date: 22–27 February

The ten teams were randomly divided into two pools of five teams to compete in round-robin competitions. The teams that finished first in the pools would play-off to determine which team would partake in the World Group II Play-offs, while the teams that finished last in the pools would be relegated to Group II for 2000.

=== Pools ===
	Pool A	TPE	IND	INA	THA	UZB
1	Chinese Taipei (4–0)		3–0	2–1	3–0	3–0
2	India (3–1)	0–3		3–0	2–1	2–1
3	Indonesia (2–2)	1–2	0–3		2–1	3–0
4	Thailand (1–3)	0–3	1–2	1–2		3–0
5	Uzbekistan (0–4)	0–3	1–2	0–3	0–3	

	Pool B	KOR	NZL	CHN	HKG	POC
1	South Korea (4–0)		2–1	2–1	3–0	3–0
2	New Zealand (3–1)	1–2		2–1	2–1	3–0
3	China (2–2)	1–2	1–2		3–0	3–0
4	Hong Kong (1–3)	0–3	1–2	0–3		3–0
5	Pacific Oceania (0–4)	0–3	0–3	0–3	0–3	

=== Play-off ===
Chinese Taipei
2
Thana City Golf Club, Samutpakarn, Thailand
27 February 1999
Hard (outdoors)

South Korea
1

			1	2	3
1	(Chinese Taipei) (South Korea)	Janet Lee; Cho Yoon-jeong	6; 3	6; 3
2	(Chinese Taipei) (South Korea)	Wang Shi-ting; Park Sung-hee	6; 1	6; 0
3	(Chinese Taipei) (South Korea)	Weng Tzu-ting / Hsu Hsueh-li; Choi Young-ja / Chung Yang-jin	1; 6	5; 7

- Chinese Taipei advanced to World Group II Play-offs.
- Uzbekistan and Pacific Oceania relegated to Group II in 2000.

== Group II ==
- Venue: Thana City Golf Club, Samutpakarn, Thailand (outdoor hard)
- Date: 22–26 February

The seven teams were divided into two pools of three and four. The top two teams from each pool then moved on to the play-off stage of the competition. The two teams that won a match from the play-off stage would advance to Group I for 2000.

=== Pools ===
	Pool A	SIN	KAZ	MAS
1	Singapore (2–0)		2–1	2–1
2	Kazakhstan (1–1)	1–2		3–0
3	Malaysia (0–2)	1–2	0–3	

	Pool B	TJK	PAK	FIJ	SYR
1	Tajikistan (3–0)		2–1	3–0	3–0
2	Pakistan (2–1)	1–2		3–0	3–0
3	Fiji (1–2)	0–3	0–3		2–1
4	Syria (0–3)	0–3	0–3	1–2	

=== Play-offs ===
A Team	Score	B Team
Singapore	2–1	Pakistan
Kazakhstan	3–0	Tajikistan

- Singapore and Kazakhstan advanced to Group I in 2000.

== See also ==
- Fed Cup structure
