= 2004 Fed Cup Asia/Oceania Zone Group II – Pool =

The Pool of the 2004 Fed Cup Asia/Oceania Zone Group II composed of five teams competing in a round robin competition. The top two teams qualified for Group I next year.

		(Pacific Oceania) POC	(Kazakhstan) KAZ	(Singapore) SIN	(Syria) SYR	(Turkmenistan) TKM	RR; W–L	Set; W–L	Game; W–L	Standings
67	Pacific Oceania		0–3	1–2	3–0	3–0	2–2	16–10	100–87	3
72	Kazakhstan	3–0		3–0	3–0	3–0	4–0	24–1	149–26	1
77	Singapore	2–1	0–3		2–1	3–0	3–1	15–10	110–83	2
95	Syria	0–3	0–3	1–2		2–1	1–3	4–14	67–132	4
	Turkmenistan	0–3	0–3	0–3	1–2		0–4	2–22	57–145	5

== Pacific Oceania vs. Kazakhstan ==
Pacific Oceania
0
R.K. Khanna Tennis Complex, New Delhi, India
20 April 2004
Decoturf II (outdoors)

Kazakhstan
3

			1	2	3
1	(Pacific Oceania) (Kazakhstan)	Irene George; Amina Rakhim	0; 6	1; 6
2	(Pacific Oceania) (Kazakhstan)	Gurianna Korinihona; Madina Rakhim	2; 6	0; 6
3	(Pacific Oceania) (Kazakhstan)	Angelita Detudamo / Gurianna Korinihona; Yekaterina Morozova / Madina Rakhim	1; 6	2; 6

== Singapore vs. Turkmenistan ==
Singapore
3
R.K. Khanna Tennis Complex, New Delhi, India
20 April 2004
Decoturf II (outdoors)

Turkmenistan
0

			1	2	3
1	(Singapore) (Turkmenistan)	Lee Wei-ping; Ummarahmat Hummetova	6; 1	6; 2
2	(Singapore) (Turkmenistan)	Wong Rui-Jing; Jenneta Halliyeva	6; 0	6; 3
3	(Singapore) (Turkmenistan)	Lee Wei-ping / Wong Rui-Jing; Ummarahmat Hummetova / Jenneta Halliyeva	6; 0	6; 0

== Pacific Oceania vs. Turkmenistan ==
Pacific Oceania
3
R.K. Khanna Tennis Complex, New Delhi, India
21 April 2004
Decoturf II (outdoors)

Turkmenistan
0

			1	2	3
1	(Pacific Oceania) (Turkmenistan)	Irene George; Almira Hallyeva	6; 3	7^{12} 6^{10}
2	(Pacific Oceania) (Turkmenistan)	Gurianna Korinihona; Jenneta Halliyeva	6; 3	7^{16} 6^{14}
3	(Pacific Oceania) (Turkmenistan)	Angelita Detudamo / Irene George; Veronika Babayan / Almira Hallyeva	6; 1	6; 2

== Singapore vs. Syria ==
Singapore
2
R.K. Khanna Tennis Complex, New Delhi, India
21 April 2004
Decoturf II (outdoors)

Syria
1

			1	2	3
1	(Singapore) (Syria)	Lee Wei-ping; Hazar Sidki	6; 2	6; 0
2	(Singapore) (Syria)	Wong Rui-Jing; Lara Alsamman	6; 0	7; 1
3	(Singapore) (Syria)	Ng Yun-Ling / Tong Pei-Ling; Nivin Kezbari / Hazar Sidki	6^{5} 7^{7}	4; 6

== Pacific Oceania vs. Syria ==
Pacific Oceania
3
R.K. Khanna Tennis Complex, New Delhi, India
22 April 2004
Decoturf II (outdoors)

Syria
0

			1	2	3
1	(Pacific Oceania) (Syria)	Irene George; Hazar Sidki	6; 3	6; 3
2	(Pacific Oceania) (Syria)	Gurianna Korinihona; Lara Alsamman	6; 0	6; 1
3	(Pacific Oceania) (Syria)	Angelita Detudamo / Gurianna Korinihona; Nivin Kezbari / Lara Alsamman	6; 2	6; 4

== Kazakhstan vs. Turkmenistan ==
Kazakhstan
3
R.K. Khanna Tennis Complex, New Delhi, India
22 April 2004
Decoturf II (outdoors)

Turkmenistan
0

			1	2	3
1	(Kazakhstan) (Turkmenistan)	Yekaterina Morozova; Ummarahmat Hummetova	6; 1	6; 0
2	(Kazakhstan) (Turkmenistan)	Amina Rakhim; Veronika Babayan	6; 2	6; 1
3	(Kazakhstan) (Turkmenistan)	Amina Rakhim / Madina Rakhim; Ummarahmat Hummetova / Veronika Babayan	6; 0	6; 0

== Pacific Oceania vs. Singapore ==
Pacific Oceania
1
R.K. Khanna Tennis Complex, New Delhi, India
23 April 2004
Decoturf II (outdoors)

Singapore
2

			1	2	3
1	(Pacific Oceania) (Singapore)	Irene George; Lee Wei-ping	3; 6	3; 6
2	(Pacific Oceania) (Singapore)	Gurianna Korinihona; Wong Rui-Jing	2; 6	0; 6
3	(Pacific Oceania) (Singapore)	Irene George / Gurianna Korinihona; Ng Yun-Ling / Tong Pei-Ling	6; 3	6; 0

== Kazakhstan vs. Syria ==
Kazakhstan
3
R.K. Khanna Tennis Complex, New Delhi, India
23 April 2004
Decoturf II (outdoors)

Syria
0

			1	2	3
1	(Kazakhstan) (Syria)	Yekaterina Morozova; Nivin Kezbari	6; 3	6; 0
2	(Kazakhstan) (Syria)	Madina Rakhi; Lara Alsamman	6; 0	7; 0
3	(Kazakhstan) (Syria)	Yekaterina Morozova / Amina Rakhim; Nivin Kezbari / Hazar Sidki	6; 7	6; 0

== Kazakhstan vs. Singapore ==
Kazakhstan
3
R.K. Khanna Tennis Complex, New Delhi, India
24 April 2004
Decoturf II (outdoors)

Singapore
0

			1	2	3
1	(Kazakhstan) (Singapore)	Yekaterina Morozova; Tong Pei-Ling	6; 0	6; 3
2	(Kazakhstan) (Singapore)	Amina Rakhim; Ng Yun-Ling	6; 1	7; 0
3	(Kazakhstan) (Singapore)	Amina Rakhim / Madina Rakhim; Lee Wei-ping / Wong Rui-Jing	5; 7	6; 1	6; 1

== Syria vs. Turkmenistan ==
Syria
2
R.K. Khanna Tennis Complex, New Delhi, India
24 April 2004
Decoturf II (outdoors)

Turkmenistan
1

			1	2	3
1	(Syria) (Turkmenistan)	Hazar Sidki; Ummarahmat Hummetova	6; 1	6; 4
2	(Syria) (Turkmenistan)	Lara Alsamman; Jenneta Halliyeva	6; 2	7^{7} 6^{5}
3	(Syria) (Turkmenistan)	Nivin Kezbari / Hazar Sidki; Ummarahmat Hummetova / Veronika Babayan	6^{0} 7^{7}	4; 6

- Kazakhstan and Singapore advanced to Group I for next year, where they both placed equal last. Thus both teams were relegated back to Group II for 2006.

== See also ==
- Fed Cup structure
