= 2002 Fed Cup Asia/Oceania Zone Group II – Pool =

International tennis competition

The Pool of the 2002 Fed Cup Asia/Oceania Zone Group II composed of five teams competing in a round robin competition. The top two teams qualified for Group I next year.

== Matchups ==
| | (Malaysia) MAS | (Kazakhstan) KAZ | (Pacific Oceania) POC | (Singapore) SIN | (Syria) SYR | RR; W–L | Set; W–L | Game; W–L | Standings |
| Malaysia | | 2–1 | 2–1 | 3–0 | 3–0 | 4–0 | 14–6 | 103–66 | 1 |
| Kazakhstan | 1–2 | | 3–0 | 3–0 | 3–0 | 3–1 | 15–4 | 97–54 | 2 |
| Pacific Oceania | 1–2 | 0–3 | | 3–0 | 3–0 | 2–2 | 15–10 | 116–90 | 3 |
| Singapore | 0–3 | 0–3 | 0–3 | | 3–0 | 1–3 | 6–12 | 53–64 | 4 |
| Syria | 0–3 | 0–3 | 0–3 | 0–3 | | 0–4 | 0–18 | 16–108 | 5 |

=== Malaysia vs. Singapore ===
Malaysia
3
Guangzhou, China
4 March 2002
Plexipave (outdoors)

Singapore
0

| | | | 1 | 2 | 3 |
|---|---|---|---|---|---|
| 1 | (Malaysia) (Singapore) | Liaw Chen-Yee; Sonya Kumar | 6; 1 | 6; 0 |
| 2 | (Malaysia) (Singapore) | Khoo Chin-bee; Agustine Limanto | 7^{7} 6^{5} | 6; 4 |
| 3 | (Malaysia) (Singapore) | Khoo Chin-bee / Liaw Chen-Yee; Tina Jacob / Sonya Kumar | 6; 1 | 6; 1 |

=== Pacific Oceania vs. Syria ===
Pacific Oceania
3
Guangzhou, China
4 March 2002
Plexipave (outdoors)

Syria
0

| | | | 1 | 2 | 3 |
|---|---|---|---|---|---|
| 1 | (Pacific Oceania) (Syria) | Gurianna Korinihona; Shaza Tinawi | 6; 1 | 6; 0 |
| 2 | (Pacific Oceania) (Syria) | Davilyn Godinet; Lara Alsamman | 6; 1 | 6; 1 |
| 3 | (Pacific Oceania) (Syria) | Davilyn Godinet / Gurianna Korinihona; Lara Alsamman / Shaza Tinawi | 6; 0 | 6; 1 |

=== Pacific Oceania vs. Kazakhstan ===
Pacific Oceania
0
Guangzhou, China
5 March 2002
Plexipave (outdoors)

Kazakhstan
3

| | | | 1 | 2 | 3 |
|---|---|---|---|---|---|
| 1 | (Pacific Oceania) (Kazakhstan) | Gurianna Korinihona; Valeria Khazova | 3; 6 | 4; 6 |
| 2 | (Pacific Oceania) (Kazakhstan) | Davilyn Godinet; Olga Dzuba | 2; 6 | 1; 6 |
| 3 | (Pacific Oceania) (Kazakhstan) | Davilyn Godinet / Irene Mani; Olga Dzuba / Alissa Velts | 2; 6 | 4; 6 |

=== Singapore vs. Syria ===
Singapore
3
Guangzhou, China
5 March 2002
Plexipave (outdoors)

Syria
0

| | | | 1 | 2 | 3 |
|---|---|---|---|---|---|
| 1 | (Singapore) (Syria) | Sonya Kumar; Shaza Tinawi | 6; 1 | 6; 2 |
| 2 | (Singapore) (Syria) | Agustine Limanto; Lara Alsamman | 6; 1 | 6; 0 |
| 3 | (Singapore) (Syria) | Tina Jacob / Sonya Kumar; Lara Alsamman / Hazar Sidki | 6; 3 | 6; 1 |

=== Malaysia vs. Syria ===
Malaysia
3
Guangzhou, China
6 March 2002
Plexipave (outdoors)

Syria
0

| | | 1 | 2 | 3 |
|---|---|---|---|---|
| 1 | (Malaysia) (Syria) |
| 2 | (Malaysia) (Syria) |
| 3 | (Malaysia) (Syria) |

=== Kazakhstan vs. Singapore ===
Kazakhstan
3
Guangzhou, China
6 March 2002
Plexipave (outdoors)

Singapore
0

| | | 1 | 2 | 3 |
|---|---|---|---|---|
| 1 | (Kazakhstan) (Singapore) |
| 2 | (Kazakhstan) (Singapore) |
| 3 | (Kazakhstan) (Singapore) |

=== Pacific Oceania vs. Malaysia ===
Pacific Oceania
1
Guangzhou, China
7 March 2002
Plexipave (outdoors)

Malaysia
2

| | | | 1 | 2 | 3 |
|---|---|---|---|---|---|
| 1 | (Pacific Oceania) (Malaysia) | Gurianna Korinihona; Liaw Chen-Yee | 2; 6 | 6; 1 | 6; 8 |
| 2 | (Pacific Oceania) (Malaysia) | Davilyn Godinet; Khoo Chin-bee | 2; 6 | 0; 6 |
| 3 | (Pacific Oceania) (Malaysia) | Davilyn Godinet / Gurianna Korinihona; Liaw Chen-Yee / Krishna Logeswari | 6; 2 | 6; 4 |

=== Kazakhstan vs. Syria ===
Kazakhstan
3
Guangzhou, China
7 March 2002
Plexipave (outdoors)

Syria
0

| | | | 1 | 2 | 3 |
|---|---|---|---|---|---|
| 1 | (Kazakhstan) (Syria) | Valeria Khazova; Shaza Tinawi | 6; 1 | 6; 1 |
| 2 | (Kazakhstan) (Syria) | Alissa Velts; Lara Alsamman | 6; 0 | 6; 0 |
| 3 | (Kazakhstan) (Syria) | Valeria Khazova / Alissa Velts; Lara Alsamman / Hazar Sidki | 6; 0 | 6; 2 |

=== Malaysia vs. Kazakhstan ===
Malaysia
2
Guangzhou, China
8 March 2002
Plexipave (outdoors)

Kazakhstan
1

| | | | 1 | 2 | 3 |
|---|---|---|---|---|---|
| 1 | (Malaysia) (Kazakhstan) | Liaw Chen-Yee; Alissa Velts | 6^{5} 7^{7} | 0; 6 |
| 2 | (Malaysia) (Kazakhstan) | Khoo Chin-bee; Olga Dzuba | 6; 1 | 6; 2 |
| 3 | (Malaysia) (Kazakhstan) | Khoo Chin-bee / Liaw Chen-Yee; Olga Dzuba / Valeria Khazova | 4; 6 | 6; 1 | 6; 2 |

=== Pacific Oceania vs. Singapore ===
Pacific Oceania
3
Guangzhou, China
8 March 2002
Plexipave (outdoors)

Singapore
0

| | | | 1 | 2 | 3 |
|---|---|---|---|---|---|
| 1 | (Pacific Oceania) (Singapore) | Gurianna Korinihona; Sonya Kumar | 6; 3 | 6; 2 |
| 2 | (Pacific Oceania) (Singapore) | Davilyn Godinet; Agustine Limanto | 6; 4 | 6; 1 |
| 3 | (Pacific Oceania) (Singapore) | Gurianna Korinihona / Irene Mani; Tina Jacob / Sonya Kumar | 6; 3 | 6; 4 |

- Malaysia and Kazakhstan advanced to Group I for next year, where they respectively placed fifth and last in the same pool of six. Kazakhstan, thus, was relegated back down to Group II for 2004.

== See also ==
- Fed Cup structure
- 2002 Fed Cup Asia/Oceania Zone
- 2002 Fed Cup Asia/Oceania Zone Group I – Pool A
- 2002 Fed Cup Asia/Oceania Zone Group I – Pool B
