= 2000 Fed Cup Asia/Oceania Zone Group II – play-offs =

The play-offs of the 2000 Fed Cup Asia/Oceania Zone Group II were the final stages of the Group II Zonal Competition involving teams from Asia and Oceania. Those that qualified for this stage placed first and second in their respective pools.

Placing	Pool A	Pool B
1	Uzbekistan	Philippines
2	Pacific Oceania	Tajikistan
3	Malaysia	Sri Lanka
4	Fiji	Jordan
5	Iraq	Pakistan
6		Syria

The four teams were then paired up the team from a different placing of the other group for a play-off tie, with the winners being promoted to Group I in 2001.

== Uzbekistan vs. Tajikistan ==
Uzbekistan
2
Utsubo Tennis Center, Osaka, Japan
30 April 2000
Decoturf (outdoors)

Tajikistan
0

			1	2	3
1	(Uzbekistan) (Tajikistan)	Luiza Biktyakova; Zihaida Shantalova	4; 6	7; 5	7; 5
2	(Uzbekistan) (Tajikistan)	Iroda Tulyaganova; Shahlio Ibadullaeva	6; 1	6; 1
3	(Uzbekistan) (Tajikistan)	Luiza Biktyakova / Iroda Tulyaganova; Shahlio Ibadullaeva / Zihaida Shantalova				not played

- Uzbekistan advanced to Group I in 2001, where they placed third in their pool of five.

== Pacific Oceania vs. Philippines ==
Pacific Oceania
2
Utsubo Tennis Center, Osaka, Japan
30 April 2000
Decoturf (outdoors)

Philippines
0

			1	2	3
1	(Pacific Oceania) (Philippines)	Davilyn Godinet; Czarina-Mae Arévalo	0; 6	7^{8} 6^{6}	6; 4
2	(Pacific Oceania) (Philippines)	Tagifano So'Onalole; Maricris Gentz	6; 1	7^{7} 6^{4}
3	(Pacific Oceania) (Philippines)	Davilyn Godinet; Czarina-Mae Arévalo				not played

- Pacific Oceania advanced to Group I in 2001, where they placed last in their pool of five and was thus relegated down to Group II for 2002.

== See also ==
- Fed Cup structure
