= 2003 Fed Cup Asia/Oceania Zone Group II – Pool =

The Pool of the 2003 Fed Cup Asia/Oceania Zone Group II composed of four teams competing in a round robin competition. The top two teams qualified for Group I next year.

		(India) IND	(Philippines) PHI	(Pacific Oceania) POC	(Kyrgyzstan) KGZ	RR; W–L	Set; W–L	Game; W–L	Standings
42	India		3–0	2–0	3–0	3–0	16–2	101–42	1
62	Philippines	0–3		3–0	3–0	2–1	13–8	107–73	2
73	Pacific Oceania	0–2	0–3		3–0	1–2	7–10	65–83	3
98	Kyrgyzstan	0–3	0–3	0–3		0–3	2–18	44–119	4

== India vs. Philippines ==
India
3
Tokyo, Japan
21 April 2003
Hard (outdoors)

Philippines
0

			1	2	3
1	(India) (Philippines)	Sania Mirza; Francesca La'O	6; 2	6; 3
2	(India) (Philippines)	Manisha Malhotra; Czarina-Mae Arévalo	1; 6	6; 2	6; 3
3	(India) (Philippines)	Isha Lakhani / Meghha Vakaria; Czarina-Mae Arévalo / Francesca La'O	7; 5	6; 2

== Pacific Oceania vs. Kyrgyzstan ==
Pacific Oceania
3
Tokyo, Japan
21 April 2003
Hard (outdoors)

Kyrgyzstan
0

			1	2	3
1	(Pacific Oceania) (Kyrgyzstan)	Gurianna Korinihona; Yulia Klimchenko	7; 5	6; 0
2	(Pacific Oceania) (Kyrgyzstan)	Maylani Ah Hoy; Kunykei Koichumananova	7; 5	6; 3
3	(Pacific Oceania) (Kyrgyzstan)	Maylani Ah Hoy / Gurianna Korinihona; Yulia Klimchenko / Kunykei Koichumananova	6; 3	6; 1

== India vs. Kyrgyzstan ==
India
3
Tokyo, Japan
22 April 2003
Hard (outdoors)

Kyrgyzstan
0

			1	2	3
1	(India) (Kyrgyzstan)	Sania Mirza; Yulia Klimchenko	6; 0	6; 0
2	(India) (Kyrgyzstan)	Manisha Malhotra; Kunykei Koichumananova	6; 1	3; 6	6; 2
3	(India) (Kyrgyzstan)	Isha Lakhani / Meghha Vakaria; Olga Alexeeva / Kunykei Koichumananova	6; 0	6; 3

== Pacific Oceania vs. Philippines ==
Pacific Oceania
0
Tokyo, Japan
22 April 2003
Hard (outdoors)

Philippines
3

			1	2	3
1	(Pacific Oceania) (Philippines)	Gurianna Korinihona; Francesca La'O	7^{7} 6^{3}	2; 6	2; 6
2	(Pacific Oceania) (Philippines)	Maylani Ah Hoy; Czarina-Mae Arévalo	2; 6	4; 6
3	(Pacific Oceania) (Philippines)	Maylani Ah Hoy / Gurianna Korinihona; Czarina-Mae Arévalo / Anna-Patricia Santos	3; 6	0; 6

== Pacific Oceania vs. India ==
Pacific Oceania
0
Tokyo, Japan
23 April 2003
Hard (outdoors)

India
2

			1	2	3
1	(Pacific Oceania) (India)	Gurianna Korinihona; Sania Mirza	2; 6	0; 6
2	(Pacific Oceania) (India)	Maylani Ah Hoy; Manisha Malhotra	2; 6	4; 6
3	(Pacific Oceania) (India)	Irene George / Gurianna Korinihona; Isha Lakhani / Meghha Vakaria				not played

== Philippines vs. Kyrgyzstan ==
Philippines
3
Tokyo, Japan
24 April 2003
Hard (outdoors)

Kyrgyzstan
0

			1	2	3
1	(Philippines) (Kyrgyzstan)	Francesca La'O; Yulia Klimchenko	6; 1	6; 2
2	(Philippines) (Kyrgyzstan)	Czarina-Mae Arévalo; Kunykei Koichumananova	6^{3} 7^{7}	6; 4	6; 0
3	(Philippines) (Kyrgyzstan)	Francesca La'O / Anna-Patricia Santos; Olga Alexeeva / Yulia Klimchenko	6; 1	6; 0

- India and Philippines advanced to Group I for next year, where they respectively placed third and eighth overall. Philippines was thus relegated down to Group II for 2005.

== See also ==
- Fed Cup structure
