= 2001 Fed Cup Asia/Oceania Zone =

Subsection of tennis competition

The Asia/Oceania Zone was one of three zones of regional competition in the 2001 Fed Cup.

== Group I ==
- Venue: Kaohsiung, Taiwan (outdoor hard)
- Date: 9–14 April

The ten teams were divided into two pools of five teams. The teams that finished first in the pools played-off to determine which team would partake in the World Group play-offs. The two nations coming last in the pools were relegated to Group II for 2002.

=== Pools ===
| | Pool A | INA | KOR | IND | NZL | POC |
| 1 | Indonesia (4–0) | | 2–1 | 3–0 | 3–0 | 3–0 |
| 2 | South Korea (2–2) | 1–2 | | 1–2 | 2–1 | 3–0 |
| 3 | India (2–2) | 0–3 | 2–1 | | 1–2 | 3–0 |
| 4 | New Zealand (2–2) | 0–3 | 1–2 | 2–1 | | 3–0 |
| 5 | Pacific Oceania (0–4) | 0–3 | 0–3 | 0–3 | 0–3 | |

| | Pool B | TPE | CHN | UZB | THA | KAZ |
| 1 | Chinese Taipei (4–0) | | 2–1 | 3–0 | 3–0 | 3–0 |
| 2 | China (3–1) | 1–2 | | 3–0 | 3–0 | 3–0 |
| 3 | Uzbekistan (2–2) | 0–3 | 0–3 | | 2–1 | 3–0 |
| 4 | Thailand (1–3) | 0–3 | 0–3 | 1–2 | | 3–0 |
| 5 | Kazakhstan (0–4) | 0–3 | 0–3 | 0–3 | 0–3 | |

=== Play-off ===
Indonesia
2
Kaohsiung, Taiwan
14 April 2001
Rebound Ace (outdoors)

Chinese Taipei
1

| | | | 1 | 2 | 3 |
|---|---|---|---|---|---|
| 1 | (Indonesia) (Chinese Taipei) | Romana Tedjakusuma; Chuang Chia-jung | 6; 4 | 6^{6} 7^{8} | 6; 3 |
| 2 | (Indonesia) (Chinese Taipei) | Wynne Prakusya; Janet Lee | 4; 6 | 1; 6 |
| 3 | (Indonesia) (Chinese Taipei) | Yayuk Basuki / Wynne Prakusya; Chuang Chia-jung / Janet Lee | 7; 5 | 3; 6 | 6; 1 |

- Indonesia advanced to 2001 World Group play-offs.
- Pacific Oceania and Kazakhstan relegated to Group II in 2002.

== Group II ==
- Venue: Kaohsiung, Taiwan (outdoor hard)
- Date: 9–14 April

The seven teams were divided into two pools of three and four. The top two teams from each pool then moved on to the play-off stage of the competition. The two teams that won a match from the play-off stage would advance to Group I for 2000.

| | Pool A | HKG | SIN | FIJ |
| 1 | Hong Kong (2–0) | | 3–0 | 3–0 |
| 2 | Singapore (1–1) | 0–3 | | 2–1 |
| 3 | Fiji (0–2) | 0–3 | 1–2 | |

| | Pool B | PHI | MAS | SRI | SYR |
| 1 | Philippines (3–0) | | 2–1 | 3–0 | 3–0 |
| 2 | Malaysia (2–1) | 1–2 | | 3–0 | 3–0 |
| 3 | Sri Lanka (1–2) | 0–3 | 0–3 | | 3–0 |
| 4 | Syria (0–3) | 0–3 | 0–3 | 0–3 | |

=== Play-offs ===
Play-offs
Malaysia | 3
Singapore | 0

First round
Hong Kong | 2
Malaysia | 1
Singapore | 0
Philippines | 3

Second round
Hong Kong | 0
Philippines | 3

Play-off
Fiji | 1
Syria | 2

First round
Fiji | 1
Sri Lanka | 2

- Philippines and Hong Kong advanced to Group I in 2002.

== See also ==
- Fed Cup structure
