= 1999 Fed Cup Asia/Oceania Zone Group II – Pool B =

International tennis competition

Group B of the 1999 Fed Cup Asia/Oceania Zone Group II was one of two pools in the Asia/Oceania Zone Group II of the 1999 Fed Cup. Three teams competed in a round robin competition, with the top two teams qualifying for the play-offs.

	(Tajikistan) TJK	(Pakistan) PAK	(Fiji) FIJ	(Syria) SYR	RR; W–L	Set; W–L	Game; W–L	Standings
Tajikistan		2–1	3–0	3–0	3–0	17–2	111–41	1
Pakistan	1–2		3–0	3–0	2–1	14–6	103–87	2
Fiji	3–0	0–3		2–1	1–2	5–15	72–108	3
Syria	0–3	0–3	1–2		0–3	4–16	64–114	4

== Tajikistan vs. Pakistan ==
Tajikistan
2
Thana City Golf Club, Samutpakarn, Thailand
22 February 1999
Hard (outdoors)

Pakistan
1

			1	2	3
1	(Tajikistan) (Pakistan)	Eugenia Silantieva; Mehvish Chishtie	6; 0	6; 0
2	(Tajikistan) (Pakistan)	Youliya Dimitrova; Haleema Rahim	6; 0	6; 1
3	(Tajikistan) (Pakistan)	Shahlio Ibadullaeva / Zihaida Shantalova; Nosheen Ehtesham / Mariam Rahim	7^{7} 6^{4}	3; 6	4; 6

== Fiji vs. Syria ==
Fiji
2
Thana City Golf Club, Samutpakarn, Thailand
22 February 1999
Hard (outdoors)

Syria
1

			1	2	3
1	(Fiji) (Syria)	Archana Reddy; Shaza Tinawi	6; 1	4; 6	6; 4
2	(Fiji) (Syria)	Hamidan Bibi; Farah Dayoub	3; 6	4; 6
3	(Fiji) (Syria)	Hamidan Bibi / Archana Reddy; Farah Dayoub / Shaza Tinawi	6; 3	6; 4

== Tajikistan vs. Fiji ==
Tajikistan
3
Thana City Golf Club, Samutpakarn, Thailand
24 February 1999
Hard (outdoors)

Fiji
0

			1	2	3
1	(Tajikistan) (Fiji)	Eugenia Silantieva; Archana Reddy	6; 3	6; 3
2	(Tajikistan) (Fiji)	Youliya Dimitrova; Hamidan Bibi	6; 0	6; 2
3	(Tajikistan) (Fiji)	Youliya Dimitrova / Eugenia Silantieva; Hamidan Bibi / Archana Reddy	6; 3	6; 3

== Pakistan vs. Syria ==
Pakistan
3
Thana City Golf Club, Samutpakarn, Thailand
24 February 1999
Hard (outdoors)

Syria
0

			1	2	3
1	(Pakistan) (Syria)	Mariam Rahim; Shaza Tinawi	7^{7} 6^{3}	6; 4
2	(Pakistan) (Syria)	Haleema Rahim; Farah Dayoub	6; 1	5; 7	6; 2
3	(Pakistan) (Syria)	Nosheen Ehtesham / Mariam Rahim; Meray Malouf / Shaza Tinawi	6; 2	6; 4

== Tajikistan vs. Syria ==
Tajikistan
3
Thana City Golf Club, Samutpakarn, Thailand
25 February 1999
Hard (outdoors)

Syria
0

			1	2	3
1	(Tajikistan) (Syria)	Eugenia Silantieva; Shaza Tinawi	6; 1	7; 5
2	(Tajikistan) (Syria)	Youliya Dimitrova; Farah Dayoub	6; 2	6; 0
3	(Tajikistan) (Syria)	Youliya Dimitrova / Eugenia Silantieva; Meray Malouf / Shaza Tinawi	6; 0	6; 0

== Pakistan vs. Fiji ==
Pakistan
3
Thana City Golf Club, Samutpakarn, Thailand
25 February 1999
Hard (outdoors)

Fiji
0

			1	2	3
1	(Pakistan) (Fiji)	Mariam Rahim; Archana Reddy	6; 2	6; 2
2	(Pakistan) (Fiji)	Haleema Rahim; Hamidan Bibi	6; 2	6^{5} 7^{7}	6; 2
3	(Pakistan) (Fiji)	Nosheen Ehtesham / Mariam Rahim; Archana Reddy / Walena White	6; 4	6; 4

== See also ==
- Fed Cup structure
