= 2000 Fed Cup Asia/Oceania Zone Group II – Pool A =

International tennis competition

Group A of the 2000 Fed Cup Asia/Oceania Zone Group II was one of two pools in the Asia/Oceania Zone Group II of the 2000 Fed Cup. Five teams competed in a round robin competition, with the top two teams advancing to the play-off.

	(Uzbekistan) UZB	(Pacific Oceania) POC	(Malaysia) MAS	(Fiji) FIJ	(Iraq) IRQ	RR; W–L	Set; W–L	Game; W–L	Standings
Uzbekistan		2–1	2–1	3–0	3–0	4–0	20–5	144–48	1
Pacific Oceania	1–2		2–1	2–1	3–0	3–1	18–5	122–55	2
Malaysia	1–2	1–2		3–0	3–0	2–2	10–12	85–89	3
Fiji	0–3	1–2	0–3		3–0	1–3	6–16	65–112	4
Iraq	0–3	0–3	0–3	0–3		0–4	0–22	10–132	5

== Pacific Oceania vs. Uzbekistan ==
Pacific Oceania
1
Utsubo Tennis Center, Osaka, Japan
25 April 2000
Decoturf (outdoors)

Uzbekistan
2

			1	2	3
1	(Pacific Oceania) (Uzbekistan)	Davilyn Godinet; Luiza Biktyakova	3; 6	1; 6
2	(Pacific Oceania) (Uzbekistan)	Tagifano So'Onalole; Iroda Tulyaganova	3; 6	2; 6
3	(Pacific Oceania) (Uzbekistan)	Davilyn Godinet / Tagifano So'Onalole; Luiza Biktyakova / Iroda Tulyaganova	6; 1	5; 7	6; 4

== Malaysia vs. Fiji ==
Malaysia
2
Utsubo Tennis Center, Osaka, Japan
25 April 2000
Decoturf (outdoors)

Fiji
0

			1	2	3
1	(Malaysia) (Fiji)	Keng Pei-Yuin; Hamidan Bibi	6; 2	6; 1
2	(Malaysia) (Fiji)	Liaw Chen-Yee; Archana Reddy	6; 3	6; 2
3	(Malaysia) (Fiji)	Keng Pei-Yuin / Sangaram Shangamitra; Hamidan Bibi / Archana Reddy	6; 3	6; 4

== Pacific Oceania vs. Fiji ==
Pacific Oceania
2
Utsubo Tennis Center, Osaka, Japan
26 April 2000
Decoturf (outdoors)

Fiji
0

			1	2	3
1	(Pacific Oceania) (Fiji)	Nicole Angat; Hamidan Bibi	6; 1	6; 2
2	(Pacific Oceania) (Fiji)	Davilyn Godinet; Archana Reddy	6; 1	6; 1
3	(Pacific Oceania) (Fiji)	Nicole Angat / Davilyn Godinet; Hamidan Bibi / Archana Reddy				not played

== Malaysia vs. Iraq ==
Malaysia
2
Utsubo Tennis Center, Osaka, Japan
26 April 2000
Decoturf (outdoors)

Iraq
0

			1	2	3
1	(Malaysia) (Iraq)	Keng Pei-Yuin; Maral-Khachik Awanes	6; 0	6; 0
2	(Malaysia) (Iraq)	Liaw Chen-Yee; Alaa A. A. Ali	6; 1	6; 1
3	(Malaysia) (Iraq)	Keng Pei-Yuin / Sangaram Shangamitra; Alaa A. A. Ali / Salima-Esmat Salman				not played

== Uzbekistan vs. Fiji ==
Uzbekistan
3
Utsubo Tennis Center, Osaka, Japan
27 April 2000
Decoturf (outdoors)

Fiji
0

			1	2	3
1	(Uzbekistan) (Fiji)	Luiza Biktyakova; Hamidan Bibi	6; 1	6; 0
2	(Uzbekistan) (Fiji)	Iroda Tulyaganova; Archana Reddy	6; 0	6; 1
3	(Uzbekistan) (Fiji)	Luiza Biktyakova / Anna Shchupak; Hamidan Bibi / Archana Reddy	6; 3	6; 4

== Pacific Oceania vs. Iraq ==
Pacific Oceania
3
Utsubo Tennis Center, Osaka, Japan
27 April 2000
Decoturf (outdoors)

Iraq
0

			1	2	3
1	(Pacific Oceania) (Iraq)	Davilyn Godinet; Alaa A. A. Ali	6; 1	6; 0
2	(Pacific Oceania) (Iraq)	Tagifano So'Onalole; Salima-Esmat Salman	6; 0	6; 0
3	(Pacific Oceania) (Iraq)	Nicole Angat / Davilyn Godinet; Alaa A. A. Ali / Salima-Esmat Salman	6; 0	6; 1

== Uzbekistan vs. Malaysia ==
Uzbekistan
3
Utsubo Tennis Center, Osaka, Japan
28 April 2000
Decoturf (outdoors)

Malaysia
0

			1	2	3
1	(Uzbekistan) (Malaysia)	Luiza Biktyakova; Keng Pei-Yuin	6; 3	6; 3
2	(Uzbekistan) (Malaysia)	Iroda Tulyaganova; Liaw Chen-Yee	6; 0	6; 1
3	(Uzbekistan) (Malaysia)	Luiza Biktyakova / Anna Shchupak; Keng Pei-Yuin / Liaw Chen-Yee	6; 4	6; 2

== Fiji vs. Iraq ==
Fiji
3
Utsubo Tennis Center, Osaka, Japan
28 April 2000
Decoturf (outdoors)

Iraq
0

			1	2	3
1	(Fiji) (Iraq)	Hamidan Bibi; Maral-Khachik Awanes	6; 0	6; 1
2	(Fiji) (Iraq)	Archana Reddy; Salima-Esmat Salman	6; 2	6; 1
3	(Fiji) (Iraq)	Petroena Fong / Walena White; Alaa A. A. Ali / Maral-Khachik Awanes	6; 1	6; 1

== Uzbekistan vs. Iraq ==
Uzbekistan
3
Utsubo Tennis Center, Osaka, Japan
29 April 2000
Decoturf (outdoors)

Iraq
0

			1	2	3
1	(Uzbekistan) (Iraq)	Anna Shchupak; Alaa A. A. Ali	6; 0	6; 0
2	(Uzbekistan) (Iraq)	Luiza Biktyakova; Salima-Esmat Salman	6; 0	6; 0
3	(Uzbekistan) (Iraq)	Anna Shchupak / Iroda Tulyaganova; Alaa A. A. Ali / Maral-Khachik Awanes	6; 0	6; 0

== Pacific Oceania vs. Malaysia ==
Pacific Oceania
3
Utsubo Tennis Center, Osaka, Japan
29 April 2000
Decoturf (outdoors)

Malaysia
0

			1	2	3
1	(Pacific Oceania) (Malaysia)	Davilyn Godinet; Keng Pei-Yuin	6; 4	6; 0
2	(Pacific Oceania) (Malaysia)	Tagifano So'Onalole; Liaw Chen-Yee	6; 1	6; 0
3	(Pacific Oceania) (Malaysia)	Nicole Angat / Davilyn Godinet; Keng Pei-Yuin / Sangaram Shangamitra	6; 4	6; 3

== See also ==
- Fed Cup structure
