= 1999 Fed Cup Asia/Oceania Zone Group I – Pool A =

International tennis competition

Group A of the 1999 Fed Cup Asia/Oceania Zone Group I was one of two pools in the Asia/Oceania Zone Group I of the 1999 Fed Cup. Five teams competed in a round robin competition, with the top team advancing to the Group I play-off, the winner of which would advance to World Group II Play-offs, and the bottom team being relegated down to 2000 Group II.

	(Chinese Taipei) TPE	(India) IND	(Indonesia) INA	(Thailand) THA	(Uzbekistan) UZB	RR; W–L	Set; W–L	Game; W–L	Standings
Chinese Taipei		3–0	2–1	3–0	3–0	4–0	22–4	153–58	1
India	0–3		3–0	2–1	2–1	3–1	14–10	109–101	2
Indonesia	1–2	0–3		2–1	3–0	2–2	13–13	111–99	3
Thailand	0–3	1–2	1–2		3–0	1–3	10–15	96–123	4
Uzbekistan	0–3	1–2	0–3	0–3		0–4	5–22	79–157	5

== Chinese Taipei vs. Indonesia ==
Chinese Taipei
2
Thana City Golf Club, Samutpakarn, Thailand
22 February 1999
Hard (outdoors)

Indonesia
1

			1	2	3
1	(Chinese Taipei) (Indonesia)	Janet Lee; Liza Andriyani	4; 6	6; 1	6; 2
2	(Chinese Taipei) (Indonesia)	Wang Shi-ting; Wynne Prakusya	6; 0	6; 1
3	(Chinese Taipei) (Indonesia)	Hsu Hsueh-li / Weng Tzu-ting; Irawati Iskandar / Wynne Prakusya	0; 6	2; 6

== India vs. Uzbekistan ==
India
2
Thana City Golf Club, Samutpakarn, Thailand
22 February 1999
Hard (outdoors)

Uzbekistan
1

			1	2	3
1	(India) (Uzbekistan)	Uzma Khan; Lilia Biktyakova	6; 2	7^{7} 6^{1}
2	(India) (Uzbekistan)	Nirupama Vaidyanathan; Natalia Nikitina	6; 2	6; 0
3	(India) (Uzbekistan)	Shruti Dhawan / Sai Jayalakshmy Jayaram; Lilia Biktyakova / Natalia Nikitina	4; 6	3; 6

== Chinese Taipei vs. India ==
Chinese Taipei
3
Thana City Golf Club, Samutpakarn, Thailand
23 February 1999
Hard (outdoors)

India
0

			1	2	3
1	(Chinese Taipei) (India)	Janet Lee; Uzma Khan	6; 2	6; 2
2	(Chinese Taipei) (India)	Wang Shi-ting; Nirupama Vaidyanathan	6; 0	6; 1
3	(Chinese Taipei) (India)	Janet Lee / Wang Shi-ting; Sai Jayalakshmy Jayaram / Nirupama Vaidyanathan	6; 3	6; 2

== Thailand vs. Uzbekistan ==
Thailand
3
Thana City Golf Club, Samutpakarn, Thailand
23 February 1999
Hard (outdoors)

Uzbekistan
0

			1	2	3
1	(Thailand) (Uzbekistan)	Monthika Anuchan; Lilia Biktyakova	6; 4	6; 3
2	(Thailand) (Uzbekistan)	Marissa Niroj; Natalia Nikitina	6; 0	6; 2
3	(Thailand) (Uzbekistan)	Monthika Anuchan / Marissa Niroj; Natalia Nikitina / Lilia Biktyakova	4; 6	6; 2	11; 9

== Chinese Taipei vs. Uzbekistan ==
Chinese Taipei
3
Thana City Golf Club, Samutpakarn, Thailand
24 February 1999
Hard (outdoors)

Uzbekistan
0

			1	2	3
1	(Chinese Taipei) (Uzbekistan)	Janet Lee; Lilia Biktyakova	6; 3	6; 2
2	(Chinese Taipei) (Uzbekistan)	Wang Shi-ting; Natalia Nikitina	6; 1	6; 2
3	(Chinese Taipei) (Uzbekistan)	Hsu Hsueh-li / Weng Tzu-ting; Lilia Biktyakova / Kamila Dadakhodjaeva	5; 7	6; 2	6; 0

== Indonesia vs. Thailand ==
Indonesia
2
Thana City Golf Club, Samutpakarn, Thailand
24 February 1999
Hard (outdoors)

Thailand
1

			1	2	3
1	(Indonesia) (Thailand)	Irawati Iskandar; Monthika Anuchan	3; 6	4; 6
2	(Indonesia) (Thailand)	Wynne Prakusya; Marissa Niroj	6; 1	6; 1
3	(Indonesia) (Thailand)	Irawati Iskandar / Wynne Prakusya; Monthika Anuchan / Marissa Niroj	6; 1	6; 3

== Chinese Taipei vs. Thailand ==
Chinese Taipei
3
Thana City Golf Club, Samutpakarn, Thailand
25 February 1999
Hard (outdoors)

Thailand
0

			1	2	3
1	(Chinese Taipei) (Thailand)	Janet Lee; Monthika Anuchan	6; 3	6; 1
2	(Chinese Taipei) (Thailand)	Wang Shi-ting; Marissa Niroj	6; 2	6; 0
3	(Chinese Taipei) (Thailand)	Janet Lee / Wang Shi-ting; Suvimol Duangchan / Marissa Niroj	6; 1	6; 2

== India vs. Indonesia ==
India
3
Thana City Golf Club, Samutpakarn, Thailand
25 February 1999
Hard (outdoors)

Indonesia
0

			1	2	3
1	(India) (Indonesia)	Uzma Khan; Irawati Iskandar	6; 4	6; 2
2	(India) (Indonesia)	Nirupama Vaidyanathan; Wynne Prakusya	6; 2	6; 3
3	(India) (Indonesia)	Sai Jayalakshmy Jayaram / Nirupama Vaidyanathan; Liza Andriyani / Irawati Iskandar	6; 2	7^{7} 6^{3}

== India vs. Thailand ==
India
2
Thana City Golf Club, Samutpakarn, Thailand
26 February 1999
Hard (outdoors)

Thailand
1

			1	2	3
1	(India) (Thailand)	Uzma Khan; Monthika Anuchan	6; 3	6; 3
2	(India) (Thailand)	Nirupama Vaidyanathan; Suvimol Duangchan	6; 3	6; 3
3	(India) (Thailand)	Shruti Dhawan / Sai Jayalakshmy Jayaram; Suvimol Duangchan / Marissa Niroj	2; 6	4; 6

== Indonesia vs. Uzbekistan ==
Indonesia
3
Thana City Golf Club, Samutpakarn, Thailand
26 February 1999
Hard (outdoors)

Uzbekistan
0

			1	2	3
1	(Indonesia) (Uzbekistan)	Irawati Iskandar; Lilia Biktyakova	6; 3	3; 6	6; 1
2	(Indonesia) (Uzbekistan)	Wynne Prakusya; Natalia Nikitina	6; 2	6; 0
3	(Indonesia) (Uzbekistan)	Irawati Iskandar / Wynne Prakusya; Lilia Biktyakova / Natalia Nikitina	6; 0	6; 2

- Uzbekistan placed last in the pool, and thus was relegated to Group II in 2000, where they achieved advancement back into Group I for 2001.

== See also ==
- Fed Cup structure
