= 1999 Fed Cup Asia/Oceania Zone Group II – play-offs =

International tennis competition play-offs

The play-offs of the 1999 Fed Cup Asia/Oceania Zone Group II were the final stages of the Group II Zonal Competition involving teams from Asia and Oceania. Those that qualified for this stage placed first and second in their respective pools.

Placing	Pool A	Pool B
1	Singapore	Tajikistan
2	Kazakhstan	Pakistan
3	Malaysia	Fiji
4		Syria

The four teams were then paired up the team from a different placing of the other group for a play-off tie, with the winners being promoted to Group I in 2000.

== Singapore vs. Pakistan ==
Singapore
2
Thana City Golf Club, Samutpakarn, Thailand
26 February 1999
Hard (outdoors)

Pakistan
1

			1	2	3
1	(Singapore) (Pakistan)	Leong Jil-Lin; Haleema Rahim	7; 1	6; 4
2	(Singapore) (Pakistan)	Wong Rui-Jing; Nosheen Ehtesham	6; 1	6; 0
3	(Singapore) (Pakistan)	Lee King-See / Leow Yik-Hui; Nosheen Ehtesham / Haleema Rahim	6; 2	4; 6	4; 6

- Singapore advanced to Group I in 2000, where they placed last in their pool of six and was thus relegated back down to Group II for 2001.

== Tajikistan vs. Kazakhstan ==
Tajikistan
0
Thana City Golf Club, Samutpakarn, Thailand
26 February 1999
Hard (outdoors)

Kazakhstan
3

			1	2	3
1	(Tajikistan) (Kazakhstan)	Eugenia Silantieva; Tatiana Babina	4; 6	2; 6
2	(Tajikistan) (Kazakhstan)	Youliya Dimitrova; Alissa Velts	2; 6	4; 6
3	(Tajikistan) (Kazakhstan)	Shahlio Ibadullaeva / Zihaida Shantalova; Alissa Velts / Elvira Yussupova	2; 6	0; 6

- Kazakhstan advanced to Group I in 2000, where they placed fourth in their pool of five.

== See also ==
- Fed Cup structure
