= 2001 Fed Cup Asia/Oceania Zone Group II – Pool A =

Group A of the 2001 Fed Cup Asia/Oceania Zone Group II was one of two pools in the Asia/Oceania Zone Group II of the 2001 Fed Cup. Three teams competed in a round robin competition, with the top two teams qualifying for the play-offs.

	(Hong Kong) HKG	(Singapore) SIN	(Fiji) FIJ	RR; W–L	Set; W–L	Game; W–L	Standings
Hong Kong		3–0	3–0	2–0	12–0	72–20	1
Singapore	0–3		2–1	1–1	4–9	40–60	2
Fiji	0–3	1–2		0–2	3–10	33–65	3

== Hong Kong vs. Fiji ==
Hong Kong
3
Kaohsiung, Taiwan
9 April 2001
Rebound Ace (outdoors)

Fiji
0

			1	2	3
1	(Hong Kong) (Fiji)	Lin Su-Chen; Adriana Thaggard	6; 3	6; 0
2	(Hong Kong) (Fiji)	Lam Po Kuen; Archana Reddy	6; 1	6; 3
3	(Hong Kong) (Fiji)	Lam Po Kuen / Cheung Wing-Shan; Hamidan Bibi / Petroena Fong	6; 2	6; 0

== Singapore vs. Fiji ==
Singapore
2
Kaohsiung, Taiwan
10 April 2001
Rebound Ace (outdoors)

Fiji
1

			1	2	3
1	(Singapore) (Fiji)	Agustine Limanto; Adriana Thaggard	6; 1	6; 1
2	(Singapore) (Fiji)	Leow Yik-Hui; Archana Reddy	0; 6	6; 0	6; 4
3	(Singapore) (Fiji)	Tina Jacob / Sonya Kumar; Archana Reddy / Adriana Thaggard	4; 6	1; 6

== Hong Kong vs. Singapore ==
Hong Kong
3
Kaohsiung, Taiwan
11 April 2001
Rebound Ace (outdoors)

Singapore
0

			1	2	3
1	(Hong Kong) (Singapore)	Lam Po Kuen; Agustine Limanto	6; 1	6; 4
2	(Hong Kong) (Singapore)	Tong Ka-po; Leow Yik-Hui	6; 1	6; 2
3	(Hong Kong) (Singapore)	Lin Su-Chen / Cheung Wing-Shan; Tina Jacob / Sonya Kumar	6; 3	6; 2

== See also ==
- Fed Cup structure
