= 2001 Fed Cup Asia/Oceania Zone Group I – Pool B =

Group B of the 2001 Fed Cup Asia/Oceania Zone Group I was one of two pools in the Asia/Oceania Zone Group I of the 2001 Fed Cup. Five teams competed in a round robin competition, with the top team advancing to the Group I play-off, the winner of which would advance to World Group II Play-offs, and the bottom team being relegated down to 2002 Group II.

	(Chinese Taipei) TPE	(China) CHN	(Uzbekistan) UZB	(Thailand) THA	(Kazakhstan) KAZ	RR; W–L	Set; W–L	Game; W–L	Standings
Chinese Taipei		2–1	3–0	3–0	3–0	4–0	22–2	142–67	1
China	1–2		3–0	3–0	3–0	3–1	19–4	138–76	2
Uzbekistan	0–3	0–3		2–1	3–0	2–2	10–13	101–120	3
Thailand	0–3	0–3	1–2		3–0	1–3	8–17	106–126	4
Kazakhstan	0–3	0–3	0–3	0–3		0–4	1–24	52–150	5

== Chinese Taipei vs. Thailand ==
Chinese Taipei
3
Kaohsiung, Taiwan
9 April 2001
Rebound Ace (outdoors)

Thailand
0

			1	2	3
1	(Chinese Taipei) (Thailand)	Chuang Chia-jung; Napaporn Tongsalee	6; 3	7^{7} 6^{3}
2	(Chinese Taipei) (Thailand)	Janet Lee; Suchanun Viratprasert	6; 4	6; 2
3	(Chinese Taipei) (Thailand)	Chuang Chia-jung / Janet Lee; Monthika Anuchan / Prariyawan Ratanakrong	6; 2	6; 1

== China vs. Kazakhstan ==
China
3
Kaohsiung, Taiwan
9 April 2001
Rebound Ace (outdoors)

Kazakhstan
0

			1	2	3
1	(China) (Kazakhstan)	Peng Shuai; Olga Dzuba	6; 2	6; 0
2	(China) (Kazakhstan)	Sun Tiantian; Valeria Khazova	6; 2	6; 0
3	(China) (Kazakhstan)	Li Na / Sun Tiantian; Olga Dzuba / Valeria Khazova	6; 1	6; 1

== China vs. Thailand ==
China
3
Kaohsiung, Taiwan
10 April 2001
Rebound Ace (outdoors)

Thailand
0

			1	2	3
1	(China) (Thailand)	Peng Shuai; Prariyawan Ratanakrong	6; 0	6; 2
2	(China) (Thailand)	Li Na; Suchanun Viratprasert	7; 5	7; 5
3	(China) (Thailand)	Li Na / Sun Tiantian; Monthika Anuchan / Napaporn Tongsalee	7; 5	6; 2

== Uzbekistan vs. Kazakhstan ==
Uzbekistan
3
Kaohsiung, Taiwan
10 April 2001
Rebound Ace (outdoors)

Kazakhstan
0

			1	2	3
1	(Uzbekistan) (Kazakhstan)	Kamila Dadakhodjaeva; Olga Dzuba	7; 5	7^{7} 6^{5}
2	(Uzbekistan) (Kazakhstan)	Iroda Tulyaganova; Valeria Khazova	6; 3	6; 1
3	(Uzbekistan) (Kazakhstan)	Akgul Amanmuradova / Iroda Tulyaganova; Olga Dzuba / Valeria Khazova	6; 3	6; 2

== Chinese Taipei vs. Kazakhstan ==
Chinese Taipei
3
Kaohsiung, Taiwan
11 April 2001
Rebound Ace (outdoors)

Kazakhstan
0

			1	2	3
1	(Chinese Taipei) (Kazakhstan)	Chuang Chia-jung; Olga Dzuba	6; 2	6; 1
2	(Chinese Taipei) (Kazakhstan)	Janet Lee; Valeria Khazova	6; 1	6; 0
3	(Chinese Taipei) (Kazakhstan)	Chao Hsiao-han / Wang I-ting; Olga Dzuba / Valeria Khazova	6; 2	6; 4

== China vs. Uzbekistan ==
China
3
Kaohsiung, Taiwan
11 April 2001
Rebound Ace (outdoors)

Uzbekistan
0

			1	2	3
1	(China) (Uzbekistan)	Peng Shuai; Kamila Dadakhodjaeva	7; 5	6; 2
2	(China) (Uzbekistan)	Li Na; Iroda Tulyaganova	6; 4	4; 1		retired
3	(China) (Uzbekistan)	Li Na / Sun Tiantian; Akgul Amanmuradova / Kamila Dadakhodjaeva	6; 3	6; 3

== Chinese Taipei vs. China ==
Chinese Taipei
2
Kaohsiung, Taiwan
12 April 2001
Rebound Ace (outdoors)

China
1

			1	2	3
1	(Chinese Taipei) (China)	Chuang Chia-jung; Peng Shuai	3; 6	4; 6
2	(Chinese Taipei) (China)	Janet Lee; Li Na	6; 1	6; 3
3	(Chinese Taipei) (China)	Chuang Chia-jung / Janet Lee; Li Na / Peng Shuai	7^{7} 6^{4}	7^{7} 6^{4}

== Uzbekistan vs. Thailand ==
Uzbekistan
2
Kaohsiung, Taiwan
12 April 2001
Rebound Ace (outdoors)

Thailand
1

			1	2	3
1	(Uzbekistan) (Thailand)	Akgul Amanmuradova; Napaporn Tongsalee	6; 3	6; 4
2	(Uzbekistan) (Thailand)	Kamila Dadakhodjaeva; Suchanun Viratprasert	5; 7	5; 7
3	(Uzbekistan) (Thailand)	Akgul Amanmuradova / Kamila Dadakhodjaeva; Monthika Anuchan / Napaporn Tongsalee	6; 4	6; 4

== Chinese Taipei vs. Uzbekistan ==
Chinese Taipei
3
Kaohsiung, Taiwan
13 April 2001
Rebound Ace (outdoors)

Uzbekistan
0

			1	2	3
1	(Chinese Taipei) (Uzbekistan)	Chuang Chia-jung; Akgul Amanmuradova	6; 3	6; 2
2	(Chinese Taipei) (Uzbekistan)	Janet Lee; Kamila Dadakhodjaeva	6; 0	6; 1
3	(Chinese Taipei) (Uzbekistan)	Chao Hsiao-han / Wang I-ting; Akgul Amanmuradova / Kamila Dadakhodjaeva	6; 3	6; 2

== Thailand vs. Kazakhstan ==
Thailand
3
Kaohsiung, Taiwan
13 April 2001
Rebound Ace (outdoors)

Kazakhstan
0

			1	2	3
1	(Thailand) (Kazakhstan)	Napaporn Tongsalee; Olga Dzuba	6; 3	6; 1
2	(Thailand) (Kazakhstan)	Suchanun Viratprasert; Valeria Khazova	6; 0	6; 0
3	(Thailand) (Kazakhstan)	Monthika Anuchan / Prariyawan Ratanakrong; Olga Dzuba / Elvira Yussupova	3; 6	6; 1	7; 5

- Kazakhstan failed to win any ties in the pool, and thus were relegated to Group II in 2002, where they finished second and thus advanced back to Group I for 2003.

== See also ==
- Fed Cup structure
