= 2002 Fed Cup Asia/Oceania Zone Group I – Pool B =

International tennis competition

Group B of the 2002 Fed Cup Asia/Oceania Zone Group II was one of two pools in the Asia/Oceania Zone Group I of the 2002 Fed Cup. Five teams competed in a round robin competition, with the top two teams advancing to the play-offs and the bottom team being relegated to Group II for next year.

== Matchups ==
	(China) CHN	(Japan) JPN	(Hong Kong) HKG	(Thailand) THA	(Uzbekistan) UZB	(Philippines) PHI	Match; W–L	Set; W–L	Game; W–L	Standings
China		2–1	3–0	3–0	3–0	3–0	5–0	28–3	179–59	1
Japan	1–2		3–0	3–0	3–0	3–0	4–1	27–5	175–70	2
Hong Kong	0–3	0–3		2–1	1–2	3–0	2–3	13–18	109–134	3
Thailand	0–3	0–3	1–2		2–1	3–0	2–3	13–19	104–151	4
Uzbekistan	0–3	0–3	2–1	1–2		2–1	2–3	10–22	120–153	5
Philippines	0–3	0–3	0–3	0–3	1–2		0–5	4–28	65–185	6

=== China vs. Thailand ===
China
3
Guangzhou, China
4 March 2002
Plexipave (outdoors)

Thailand
0

			1	2	3
1	(China) (Thailand)	Liu Nannan; Wilawan Choptang	6; 0	6; 0
2	(China) (Thailand)	Li Na; Napaporn Tongsalee	6; 1	6; 2
3	(China) (Thailand)	Li Ting / Zheng Jie; Pichaya Laosirichon / Napaporn Tongsalee	6; 2	6; 0

=== Japan vs. Philippines ===
Japan
3
Guangzhou, China
4 March 2002
Plexipave (outdoors)

Philippines
0

			1	2	3
1	(Japan) (Philippines)	Akiko Morigami; Anna-Patricia Santos	4; 6	6; 1	6; 2
2	(Japan) (Philippines)	Rika Fujiwara; Czarina-Mae Arévalo	6; 3	6; 0
3	(Japan) (Philippines)	Saori Obata / Yuka Yoshida; Czarina-Mae Arévalo / Anna-Patricia Santos	6; 0	6; 0

=== Hong Kong vs. Uzbekistan ===
Hong Kong
1
Guangzhou, China
4 March 2002
Plexipave (outdoors)

Uzbekistan
2

			1	2	3
1	(Hong Kong) (Uzbekistan)	Lam Po Kuen; Akgul Amanmuradova	1; 6	5; 7
2	(Hong Kong) (Uzbekistan)	Tong Ka-po; Ivanna Israilova	6; 1	6; 3
3	(Hong Kong) (Uzbekistan)	Lin Su-Chen / Tong Ka-po; Akgul Amanmuradova / Ivanna Israilova	2; 6	6; 4	3; 6

=== China vs. Hong Kong ===
China
3
Guangzhou, China
5 March 2002
Plexipave (outdoors)

Hong Kong
0

			1	2	3
1	(China) (Hong Kong)	Zheng Jie; Lam Po Kuen	6; 1	6; 2
2	(China) (Hong Kong)	Li Na; Tong Ka-po	6; 1	6; 3
3	(China) (Hong Kong)	Li Na / Li Ting; Cheung Wing-Shan / Lin Su-Chen	6; 1	6; 1

=== Japan vs. Thailand ===
Japan
3
Guangzhou, China
5 March 2002
Plexipave (outdoors)

Thailand
0

			1	2	3
1	(Japan) (Thailand)	Akiko Morigami; Pichaya Laosirichon	6; 1	6; 2
2	(Japan) (Thailand)	Saori Obata; Napaporn Tongsalee	6; 1	6; 0
3	(Japan) (Thailand)	Rika Fujiwara / Yuka Yoshida; Wilawan Choptang / Pichaya Laosirichon	6; 1	6; 3

=== Uzbekistan vs. Philippines ===
Uzbekistan
2
Guangzhou, China
5 March 2002
Plexipave (outdoors)

Philippines
1

			1	2	3
1	(Uzbekistan) (Philippines)	Akgul Amanmuradova; Anna-Patricia Santos	6; 0	6; 1
2	(Uzbekistan) (Philippines)	Ivanna Israilova; Czarina-Mae Arévalo	7; 5	6; 2
3	(Uzbekistan) (Philippines)	Kamila Dadakhodjaeva / Anna Shchupak; Czarina-Mae Arévalo / Anna-Patricia Santos	4; 6	4; 6

=== China vs. Philippines ===
China
3
Guangzhou, China
6 March 2002
Plexipave (outdoors)

Philippines
0

			1	2	3
1	(China) (Philippines)	Zheng Jie; Anna-Patricia Santos	6; 1	6; 1
2	(China) (Philippines)	Li Na; Czarina-Mae Arévalo	6; 0	6; 1
3	(China) (Philippines)	Li Ting / Liu Nannan; Czarina-Mae Arévalo / Anna-Patricia Santos	6; 0	6; 1

=== Japan vs. Uzbekistan ===
Japan
3
Guangzhou, China
6 March 2002
Plexipave (outdoors)

Uzbekistan
0

			1	2	3
1	(Japan) (Uzbekistan)	Akiko Morigami; Akgul Amanmuradova	6; 1	6; 2
2	(Japan) (Uzbekistan)	Saori Obata; Ivanna Israilova	6; 1	6; 1
3	(Japan) (Uzbekistan)	Rika Fujiwara / Yuka Yoshida; Kamila Dadakhodjaeva / Anna Shchupak	6; 2	6; 3

=== Hong Kong vs. Thailand ===
Hong Kong
2
Guangzhou, China
6 March 2002
Plexipave (outdoors)

Thailand
1

			1	2	3
1	(Hong Kong) (Thailand)	Lam Po Kuen; Pichaya Laosirichon	5; 7	1; 6
2	(Hong Kong) (Thailand)	Tong Ka-po; Napaporn Tongsalee	6; 2	6; 1
3	(Hong Kong) (Thailand)	Lam Po Kuen / Tong Ka-po; Pichaya Laosirichon / Napaporn Tongsalee	6; 0	6; 3

=== China vs. Uzbekistan ===
China
3
Guangzhou, China
7 March 2002
Plexipave (outdoors)

Uzbekistan
0

			1	2	3
1	(China) (Uzbekistan)	Liu Nannan; Akgul Amanmuradova	6; 2	6; 3
2	(China) (Uzbekistan)	Li Na; Ivanna Israilova	6; 1	6; 4
3	(China) (Uzbekistan)	Li Ting / Zheng Jie; Akgul Amanmuradova / Ivanna Israilova	6; 2	6; 2

=== Japan vs. Hong Kong ===
Japan
3
Guangzhou, China
7 March 2002
Plexipave (outdoors)

Hong Kong
0

			1	2	3
1	(Japan) (Hong Kong)	Yuka Yoshida; Cheung Wing-Shan	6; 1	6; 0
2	(Japan) (Hong Kong)	Rika Fujiwara; Lam Po Kuen	6; 0	6; 1
3	(Japan) (Hong Kong)	Akiko Morigami / Saori Obata; Cheung Wing-Shan / Lam Po Kuen	6; 1	6; 2

=== Thailand vs. Philippines ===
Thailand
3
Guangzhou, China
7 March 2002
Plexipave (outdoors)

Philippines
0

			1	2	3
1	(Thailand) (Philippines)	Pichaya Laosirichon; Anna-Patricia Santos	6; 2	6; 1
2	(Thailand) (Philippines)	Napaporn Tongsalee; Czarina-Mae Arévalo	4; 6	6; 2	6; 4
3	(Thailand) (Philippines)	Wilawan Choptang / Pichaya Laosirichon; Charise Godoy / Anna-Patricia Santos	6; 1	6; 3

=== China vs. Japan ===
China
2
Guangzhou, China
8 March 2002
Plexipave (outdoors)

Japan
1

			1	2	3
1	(China) (Japan)	Zheng Jie; Rika Fujiwara	5; 7	7^{7} 6^{4}	6; 1
2	(China) (Japan)	Liu Nannan; Saori Obata	6; 4	6; 2
3	(China) (Japan)	Li Na / Li Ting; Akiko Morigami / Yuka Yoshida	0; 6	5; 7

=== Hong Kong vs. Philippines ===
Hong Kong
3
Guangzhou, China
8 March 2002
Plexipave (outdoors)

Philippines
0

			1	2	3
1	(Hong Kong) (Philippines)	Lam Po Kuen; Anna-Patricia Santos	6; 2	6; 1
2	(Hong Kong) (Philippines)	Tong Ka-po; Czarina-Mae Arévalo	6; 2	6; 0
3	(Hong Kong) (Philippines)	Lam Po Kuen / Tong Ka-po; Czarina-Mae Arévalo / Anna-Patricia Santos	6; 2	6; 3

=== Thailand vs. Uzbekistan ===
Thailand
3
Guangzhou, China
8 March 2002
Plexipave (outdoors)

Uzbekistan
0

			1	2	3
1	(Thailand) (Uzbekistan)	Pichaya Laosirichon; Akgul Amanmuradova	0; 6	2; 6
2	(Thailand) (Uzbekistan)	Napaporn Tongsalee; Ivanna Israilova	6; 1	6^{1} 7^{7}	6; 4
3	(Thailand) (Uzbekistan)	Pichaya Laosirichon / Napaporn Tongsalee; Akgul Amanmuradova / Ivanna Israilova	6; 2	6; 4

- Philippines failed to win any ties in the pool, and thus was relegated to Group II in 2003, where they finished second overall and thus advanced back to Group I for 2004.

== See also ==
- Fed Cup structure
- 2002 Fed Cup Asia/Oceania Zone
- 2002 Fed Cup Asia/Oceania Zone Group I – Pool A
- 2002 Fed Cup Asia/Oceania Zone Group II
