= 2002 Fed Cup Asia/Oceania Zone =

Subsection of tennis competition

The Asia/Oceania Zone was one of three zones of regional competition in the 2002 Fed Cup.

== Group I ==
- Venue: Guangzhou, China (outdoor hard)
- Date: 4–9 March

The eleven teams were divided into two pools of five and six teams. The teams that finished first and second in the pools played-off to determine which team would partake in the World Group play-offs. The two nations coming last in the pools were relegated to Group II for 2002.

=== Pools ===
	Pool A	INA	KOR	TPE	NZL	IND
1	Indonesia (4–0)		2–1	3–0	3–0	3–0
2	South Korea (3–1)	1–2		3–0	3–0	3–0
3	Chinese Taipei (2–2)	0–3	0–3		3–0	3–0
4	New Zealand (1–3)	0–3	0–3	0–3		2–1
5	India (0–4)	0–3	0–3	0–3	1–2	

	Pool B	CHN	JPN	HKG	THA	UZB	PHI
1	China (5–0)		2–1	3–0	3–0	3–0	3–0
2	Japan (4–1)	1–2		3–0	3–0	3–0	3–0
3	Hong Kong (2–3)	0–3	0–3		2–1	1–2	3–0
4	Thailand (2–3)	0–3	0–3	1–2		2–1	3–0
5	Uzbekistan (2–3)	0–3	0–3	2–1	1–2		2–1
6	Philippines (0–5)	0–3	0–3	0–3	0–3	1–2	

=== Play-offs ===
A Team	Score	B Team
Indonesia	1–2	China
South Korea	0–3	Japan

- China and Japan advanced to 2002 World Group play-offs.
- India and Philippines relegated to Group II in 2003.

== Group II ==
- Venue: Guangzhou, China (outdoor hard)
- Date: 4–8 March

The five teams played in one pool of five, with the two teams placing first and second in the pool advancing to Group I for 2003.

=== Pool ===
	Pool	MAS	KAZ	POC	SIN	SYR
1	Malaysia (4–0)		2–1	2–1	3–0	3–0
2	Kazakhstan (3–1)	1–2		3–0	3–0	3–0
3	Pacific Oceania (2–2)	1–2	0–3		3–0	3–0
4	Singapore (1–3)	0–3	0–3	0–3		3–0
5	Syria (0–4)	0–3	0–3	0–3	0–3	

- Malaysia and Kazakhstan advanced to Group I for 2003.

== See also ==
- Fed Cup structure
