= 2002 Fed Cup Asia/Oceania Zone Group I – play-offs =

International tennis competition play-offs

The play-offs of the 2002 Fed Cup Asia/Oceania Zone Group I were the final stages of the Group I Zonal Competition involving teams from Asia and Oceania. Those that qualified for this stage placed first and second in their respective pools.

Placing	Pool A	Pool B
1	Indonesia	China
2	South Korea	Japan
3	Chinese Taipei	Hong Kong
4	New Zealand	Thailand
5	Indonesia	Uzbekistan
6		Philippines

The four teams were then paired up the team from a different placing of the other group for a play-off tie, with the winners being promoted to the World Group play-offs.

== Indonesia vs. China ==
Indonesia
1
Guangzhou, China
9 March 2002
Plexipave (outdoors)

China
2

			1	2	3
1	(Indonesia) (China)	Angelique Widjaja; Zheng Jie	4; 6	2; 6
2	(Indonesia) (China)	Wynne Prakusya; Li Na	6; 4	0; 6	2; 6
3	(Indonesia) (China)	Wynne Prakusya / Angelique Widjaja; Li Na / Li Ting	4; 3			retired

- China advanced to the World Group play-offs, where they were drawn against Russia. They lost 0–5, and thus were relegated back to Group I for 2003.

== South Korea vs. Japan ==
South Korea
0
Guangzhou, China
9 March 2002
Plexipave (outdoors)

Japan
3

			1	2	3
1	(South Korea) (Japan)	Jeon Mi-ra; Rika Fujiwara	4; 6	2; 6
2	(South Korea) (Japan)	Cho Yoon-jeong; Saori Obata	4; 6	7; 5	2; 6
3	(South Korea) (Japan)	Jeon Mi-ra / Kim Mi-ok; Akiko Morigami / Yuka Yoshida	6; 1	4; 6	3; 6

- Japan advanced to the World Group play-offs, where they were drawn against Colombia. However, the Japanese withdrew from their tie citing security concerns over the Colombian armed conflict. Japan was thus relegated down to Group I for 2003.

== See also ==
- Fed Cup structure
