= Gurianna Korinihona =

Solomon Islands tennis player

- Country (sports): Solomon Islands; Pacific Oceania (Fed Cup tournaments)
- Born: 4 November 1984 (age 41) Honiara, Solomon Islands
- Retired: 2010
- Plays: Right-handed (two-handed backhand)

Team competitions
- Fed Cup: 11–8
Medal record
yes
Representing Solomon Islands
Women's Tennis
Pacific Games
Bronze medal – third place	2003 Suva	Singles
Silver medal – second place	2003 Suva	Doubles
Bronze medal – third place	2003 Suva	Team

Gurianna Korinihona (born 4 November 1984) is a former Solomon Islands female tennis player.

Playing for Pacific Oceania in Fed Cup, Korinihona has a W/L record of 11–8.

Korinihona retirement from professional tennis 2010.

== Fed Cup participation ==
=== Singles ===
Edition	Date	Location	Against	Surface	Opponent	W/L	Score
2002 Fed Cup; Asia/Oceania Zone II	4 March 2002	Guangzhou, China	(Syria) Syria	Hard	(Syria) Shaza Tinawi	W	6–1, 6–0
2002 Fed Cup; Asia/Oceania Zone II	5 March 2002	Guangzhou, China	(Kazakhstan) Kazakhstan	Hard	(Kazakhstan) Valeria Khazova	L	4–6, 3–6
2002 Fed Cup; Asia/Oceania Zone II	6 March 2002	Guangzhou, China	(Malaysia) Malaysia	Hard	(Malaysia) Liaw Chen-Yee	L	2–6, 6–1, 6–8
2002 Fed Cup; Asia/Oceania Zone II	7 March 2002	Guangzhou, China	(Singapore) Singapore	Hard	(Singapore) Sonya Kumar	W	6–3, 6–2
2003 Fed Cup; Asia/Oceania Zone II	21 April 2003	Tokyo, Japan	(Kyrgyzstan) Kyrgyzstan	Hard	(Kyrgyzstan) Yulia Klimchenko	W	7–5, 6–0
2003 Fed Cup; Asia/Oceania Zone II	22 April 2003	Tokyo, Japan	(Philippines) Philippines	Hard	(Philippines) Francesca La'O	L	7–6^{(7–3)}, 2–6, 2–6
2003 Fed Cup; Asia/Oceania Zone II	23 April 2003	Tokyo, Japan	(India) India	Hard	(India) Sania Mirza	L	2–6, 0–6
2004 Fed Cup; Asia/Oceania Zone II	20 April 2004	New Delhi, India	(Kazakhstan) Kazakhstan	Hard	(Kazakhstan) Madina Rakhim	L	2–6, 0–6
2004 Fed Cup; Asia/Oceania Zone II	21 April 2004	New Delhi, India	(Turkmenistan) Turkmenistan	Hard	(Turkmenistan) Jenneta Halliyeva	W	6–3, 7–6^{(16–14)}
2004 Fed Cup; Asia/Oceania Zone II	22 April 2004	New Delhi, India	(Syria) Syria	Hard	(Syria) Lara Alsamman	W	6–0, 6–1
2004 Fed Cup; Asia/Oceania Zone II	23 April 2004	New Delhi, India	(Singapore) Singapore	Hard	(Singapore) Wong Rui-Jing	L	2–6, 0–6

=== Doubles ===
Edition	Date	Location	Against	Surface	Partner	Opponents	W/L	Score
2002 Fed Cup; Asia/Oceania Zone II	4 March 2002	Guangzhou, China	Syria	Hard	(Pacific Oceania) Davilyn Godinet	(Syria) Lara Alsamman (Syria) Shaza Tinawi	W	6–0, 6–1
2002 Fed Cup; Asia/Oceania Zone II	7 March 2002	Guangzhou, China	Malaysia	Hard	(Pacific Oceania) Davilyn Godinet	(Malaysia) Liaw Chen-Yee (Malaysia) Krishna Logeswari	W	6–2, 6–4
2002 Fed Cup; Asia/Oceania Zone II	8 March 2002	Guangzhou, China	Singapore	Hard	(Pacific Oceania) Irene Mani	(Singapore) Tina Jacob (Singapore) Sonya Kumar	W	6–3, 6–4
2003 Fed Cup; Asia/Oceania Zone II	21 April 2003	Tokyo, Japan	(Kyrgyzstan) Kyrgyzstan	Hard	(Pacific Oceania) Maylani Ah Hoy	(Kyrgyzstan) Yulia Klimchenko (Kyrgyzstan) Kunykei Koichumananova	W	6–3, 6–1
2003 Fed Cup; Asia/Oceania Zone II	22 April 2003	Tokyo, Japan	(Philippines) Philippines	Hard	(Pacific Oceania) Maylani Ah Hoy	(Philippines) Czarina Arevalo (Philippines) Anna-Patricia Santos	L	3–6, 0–6
2004 Fed Cup; Asia/Oceania Zone II	20 April 2004	New Delhi, India	(Kazakhstan) Kazakhstan	Hard	(Pacific Oceania) Angelita Detudamo	(Kazakhstan) Yekaterina Morozova (Kazakhstan) Madina Rakhim	L	1–6, 2–6
2004 Fed Cup; Asia/Oceania Zone II	22 April 2004	New Delhi, India	Syria	Hard	(Pacific Oceania) Angelita Detudamo	(Syria) Nivin Kezbari (Syria) Lara Alsamman	W	6–2, 6–4
2004 Fed Cup; Asia/Oceania Zone II	23 April 2004	New Delhi, India	Singapore	Hard	(Pacific Oceania) Irene George	(Singapore) Ng Yun-Ling (Singapore) Tong Pei-Ling	W	6–3, 6–0

== Other finals ==
=== Doubles ===
Outcome	Date	Tournament	Location	Partnered	Opponents	Score
Silver Medal	July 2003	2003 South Pacific Games	Suva, Fiji	(Solomon Islands) Irene George	(Samoa) Maylani Ah Hoy (Samoa) Tagifano So'Onalole	1–6, 3–6

== ITF junior results ==
=== Singles (0/1) ===
Junior Grand Slam
Category GA
Category G1
Category G2
Category G3
Category G4
Category G5

Outcome	No.	Date	Tournament	Location	Surface	Opponent	Score
Runner-up	1.	25 August 2001	Pacific Oceania Closed Junior Championships	Lautoka, Fiji	Hard	(Solomon Islands) Irene George	4–6, 3–6

=== Doubles (2/0) ===
Junior Grand Slam
Category GA
Category G1
Category G2
Category G3
Category G4
Category G5

Outcome	No.	Date	Tournament	Location	Surface	Partner	Opponents	Score
Winner	1.	3 September 1998	10th South Pacific Closed Junior Championships	Lautoka, Fiji	Hard	(Papua New Guinea) Nicole Angat	(American Samoa) Davilyn Godinet (American Samoa) Crystal Schwenke	7–6^{(7–5)}, 7–5
Winner	2.	25 August 2001	Pacific Oceania Closed Junior Championships	Lautoka, Fiji	Hard	(Solomon Islands) Irene George	(Fiji) Petroena Fong (Vanuatu) Cindy Thomas	6–3, 6–1
