= Tennis at the 2003 South Pacific Games =

- Location: Suva
- Dates: 30 June–6 July 2003

Tennis at the 2003 Pacific Games in Suva was held on June 30 – July 6, 2003.

== Medal summary ==
=== Medal table ===
Rank	Nation	Gold	Silver	Bronze	Total
1	New Caledonia (NCL)	4	2	3	9
2	Samoa (SAM)	3	4	1	8
3	Solomon Islands (SOL)	0	1	2	3
4	French Polynesia (TAH)	0	0	1	1
Totals (4 entries)		7	7	7	21

=== Medals events ===
Event	Gold	Silver	Bronze
Men's Singles	(New Caledonia) New Caledonia; Gabriel Ludru	(Samoa) Samoa; Juan Langton	(New Caledonia) New Caledonia; Thibault Bousquet
Women's Singles	(New Caledonia) New Caledonia; Élodie Rogge	(Samoa) Samoa; Tagifano So'Onalole	(Solomon Islands) Solomon Islands; Gurianna Korinihona
Men's Doubles	(New Caledonia) New Caledonia; Gabriel Ledru; Thibault Bousquet	(Samoa) Samoa; Juan Langton; Leon So'Onalole	(New Caledonia) New Caledonia; Christophe Godot; Nickolas N’Godrela
Women's Doubles	(Samoa) Samoa; Maylani Ah Hoy; Tagifano So'Onalole	(Solomon Islands) Solomon Islands; Irene George; Gurianna Korinihona	(New Caledonia) New Caledonia; Élodie Rogge; Stéphanie Di Luccio
Mixed Doubles	(Samoa) Samoa; Tagifano So'Onalole; Juan Langton	(New Caledonia) New Caledonia; Stéphanie Di Luccio; Nickolas N’Godrela	(Samoa) Samoa; Maylani Ah Hoy; Leon So'Onalole
Men's Team	(New Caledonia) New Caledonia; Thibault Bousquet; Christophe Godot; Gabriel Ledru; Nickolas N’Godrela	(Samoa) Samoa; Juan Langton; Reinsford Penn; Leon So'Onalole; Marvin So'Onalole	(French Polynesia) Tahiti; Patrice Cotti; Franck Martineau
Women's Team-	(Samoa) Samoa; Tagifano So'Onalole; Maylani Ah Hoy; Shantal Tavita; Vicky Leavai	(New Caledonia) New Caledonia; Élodie Rogge; Stéphanie Di Luccio	(Solomon Islands) Solomon Islands; Irene George; Gurianna Korinihona

== See also ==
- Tennis at the Pacific Games
