= 2002 Fed Cup Asia/Oceania Zone Group I – Pool A =

International tennis competition

Group A of the 2002 Fed Cup Asia/Oceania Zone Group I was one of two pools in the Asia/Oceania Zone Group I of the 2002 Fed Cup. Five teams competed in a round robin competition, with the top two teams advancing to the play-offs and the bottom team being relegated to Group II for next year.

== Matchups ==
	(Indonesia) INA	(South Korea) KOR	(Chinese Taipei) TPE	(New Zealand) NZL	(India) IND	RR; W–L	Set; W–L	Game; W–L	Standings
Indonesia		2–1	3–0	3–0	3–0	4–0	22–3	143–76	1
South Korea	1–2		3–0	3–0	3–0	3–1	20–5	135–60	2
Chinese Taipei	0–3	0–3		3–0	3–0	2–2	13–15	121–80	3
New Zealand	0–3	0–3	0–3		2–1	1–3	10–17	50–144	4
India	0–3	0–3	0–3	1–2		0–4	5–22	55–144	5

=== Indonesia vs. India ===
Indonesia
3
Guangzhou, China
4 March 2002
Plexipave (outdoors)

India
0

			1	2	3
1	(Indonesia) (India)	Angelique Widjaja; Rushmi Chakravarthi	6; 1	6; 2
2	(Indonesia) (India)	Wynne Prakusya; Manisha Malhotra	6; 2	6; 3
3	(Indonesia) (India)	Wynne Prakusya / Angelique Widjaja; Rushmi Chakravarthi / Manisha Malhotra	6; 3	6; 4

=== South Korea vs. New Zealand ===
South Korea
3
Guangzhou, China
4 March 2002
Plexipave (outdoors)

New Zealand
0

			1	2	3
1	(South Korea) (New Zealand)	Jeon Mi-ra; Tracey O'Connor	6; 0	6; 3
2	(South Korea) (New Zealand)	Cho Yoon-jeong; Ilke Gers	6; 4	6; 2
3	(South Korea) (New Zealand)	Jeon Mi-ra / Kim Mi-ok; Leanne Baker / Shelley Stephens	6; 2	6; 3

=== South Korea vs. India ===
South Korea
3
Guangzhou, China
5 March 2002
Plexipave (outdoors)

India
0

			1	2	3
1	(South Korea) (India)	Jeon Mi-ra; Rushmi Chakravarthi	6; 1	6; 0
2	(South Korea) (India)	Cho Yoon-jeong; Manisha Malhotra	6; 0	3; 6	6; 1
3	(South Korea) (India)	Chung Yang-jin / Kim Mi-ok; Sonal Phadke / Sheethal Goutham	6; 1	6; 1

=== Chinese Taipei vs. New Zealand ===
Chinese Taipei
3
Guangzhou, China
5 March 2002
Plexipave (outdoors)

New Zealand
0

			1	2	3
1	(Chinese Taipei) (New Zealand)	Chan Chin-wei; Tracey O'Connor	6; 0	3; 6	6; 0
2	(Chinese Taipei) (New Zealand)	Janet Lee; Ilke Gers	6; 4	6; 2
3	(Chinese Taipei) (New Zealand)	Chan Chin-wei / Janet Lee; Leanne Baker / Shelley Stephens	2; 6	7^{7} 6^{4}	6; 4

=== Indonesia vs. Chinese Taipei ===
Indonesia
3
Guangzhou, China
6 March 2002
Plexipave (outdoors)

Chinese Taipei
0

			1	2	3
1	(Indonesia) (Chinese Taipei)	Angelique Widjaja; Chan Chin-wei	6; 3	6; 0
2	(Indonesia) (Chinese Taipei)	Wynne Prakusya; Janet Lee	6^{4} 7^{7}	6; 3	6; 0
3	(Indonesia) (Chinese Taipei)	Wynne Prakusya / Angelique Widjaja; Janet Lee / Weng Tzu-ting	6; 2	6; 4

=== New Zealand vs. India ===
New Zealand
3
Guangzhou, China
6 March 2002
Plexipave (outdoors)

India
0

			1	2	3
1	(New Zealand) (India)	Ilke Gers; Rushmi Chakravarthi	6; 1	6; 0
2	(New Zealand) (India)	Shelley Stephens; Manisha Malhotra	6; 0	3; 6	6; 1
3	(New Zealand) (India)	Leanne Baker / Shelley Stephens; Rushmi Chakravarthi / Sheethal Goutham	6; 1	6; 1

=== Indonesia vs. New Zealand ===
Indonesia
3
Guangzhou, China
7 March 2002
Plexipave (outdoors)

New Zealand
0

			1	2	3
1	(Indonesia) (New Zealand)	Angelique Widjaja; Ilke Gers	6; 4	6; 1
2	(Indonesia) (New Zealand)	Wynne Prakusya; Shelley Stephens	6; 4	6; 4
3	(Indonesia) (New Zealand)	Wynne Prakusya / Angelique Widjaja; Leanne Baker / Shelley Stephens	6; 4	6; 3

=== South Korea vs. Chinese Taipei ===
South Korea
3
Guangzhou, China
7 March 2002
Plexipave (outdoors)

Chinese Taipei
0

			1	2	3
1	(South Korea) (Chinese Taipei)	Jeon Mi-ra; Chao Hsiao-han	7^{7} 6^{4}	6; 1
2	(South Korea) (Chinese Taipei)	Cho Yoon-jeong; Janet Lee	6; 2	6; 2
3	(South Korea) (Chinese Taipei)	Chung Yang-jin / Kim Mi-ok; Chan Chin-wei / Weng Tzu-ting	6; 4	7^{7} 6^{4}

=== Indonesia vs. South Korea ===
Indonesia
2
Guangzhou, China
8 March 2002
Plexipave (outdoors)

South Korea
1

			1	2	3
1	(Indonesia) (South Korea)	Angelique Widjaja; Kim Mi-ok	6; 2	6; 2
2	(Indonesia) (South Korea)	Wynne Prakusya; Chung Yang-jin	6; 4	6; 2
3	(Indonesia) (South Korea)	Diana Julianto / Wukirasih Sawondari; Cho Yoon-jeong / Jeon Mi-ra	1; 6	4; 6

=== Chinese Taipei vs. India ===
Chinese Taipei
3
Guangzhou, China
8 March 2002
Plexipave (outdoors)

India
0

			1	2	3
1	(Chinese Taipei) (India)	Chan Chin-wei; Sonal Phadke	6; 2	6; 0
2	(Chinese Taipei) (India)	Janet Lee; Manisha Malhotra	6; 4	6; 4
3	(Chinese Taipei) (India)	Chao Hsiao-han / Weng Tzu-ting; Rushmi Chakravarthi / Manisha Malhotra	3; 6	6; 3	6; 3

- India failed to win any ties in the pool, and thus was relegated to Group II in 2003, where they finished first overall and thus advanced back to Group I for 2004.

== See also ==
- Fed Cup structure
- 2002 Fed Cup Asia/Oceania Zone
- 2002 Fed Cup Asia/Oceania Zone Group I – Pool B
- 2002 Fed Cup Asia/Oceania Zone Group II
