= Pacific Oceania =

- Flag of Pacific Oceania
- Formation: 1995; 31 years ago
- Type: Multinational teams
- Region served: Pacific Islands
- Parent organization: Oceania Tennis Federation

Pacific Oceania (abbreviated to POC) is the name given to the group of island countries and territories in the Southern and Western Pacific Ocean that compete collectively as one country in both the Davis Cup (men) and Billie Jean King Cup (women) international tennis tournaments. Pacific Oceania is governed by the Oceania Tennis Federation.

As some Pacific Ocean countries and territories were deemed too small or too underdeveloped to have their own national teams, Pacific Oceania was established in 1995, with Pacific Oceania men's and women's teams first participating in the 1995 editions of the Davis Cup and Fed Cup, respectively.

== Nations and territories represented ==
Current representation

Map of countries represented in the Pacific Oceania teams. Former members (Guam and Northern Mariana Islands) in orange.

1. American Samoa
2. Cook Islands
3. Fiji (competed independently in the 1990s)
4. Kiribati
5. Marshall Islands
6. Federated States of Micronesia
7. New Caledonia
8. Nauru
9. Norfolk Island
10. Palau
11. Papua New Guinea
12. Samoa
13. Solomon Islands
14. Tahiti
15. Tonga
16. Tuvalu
17. Vanuatu

Former members

1. Guam
2. Northern Mariana Islands

== Teams outside Pacific Oceania ==
=== Former ===
The following teams were represented by Pacific Oceania at some point in time.

Nation	Men's team	Women's team	Competed independently since
Fiji	Davis Cup team	Fed Cup team	1999 (has not competed since 2002)
Guam	Davis Cup team	Billie Jean King Cup team	2018
Northern Mariana Islands	Davis Cup team	Billie Jean King Cup team	2024

=== Never represented ===
Oceania Tennis Federation members never represented

Nation	Men's team	Women's team
Australia	Davis Cup team	Billie Jean King Cup team
New Zealand	Davis Cup team	Billie Jean King Cup team

== See also ==
- Oceania
- Pacific Oceania Davis Cup team
- Pacific Oceania Billie Jean King Cup team
- Guam Davis Cup team
- Guam Billie Jean King Cup team
- Fiji Davis Cup team
- Fiji Billie Jean King Cup team
- International Tennis Federation
