= Irene George =

Solomon Islands tennis player

- Country (sports): Solomon Islands; Pacific Oceania (Fed Cup tournaments)
- Born: 11 October 1983 (age 42) Honiara, Solomon Islands
- Retired: 2010
- Plays: Right-handed (two-handed backhand)

Team competitions
- Fed Cup: 4–2
Medal record
yes
Representing Solomon Islands
Women's Tennis
Pacific Games
Silver medal – second place	2003 Suva	Doubles
Bronze medal – third place	2003 Suva	Team

Irena George (born 10 November 1983) is a former Solomon Islands female tennis player.

Playing for Pacific Oceania in Fed Cup, George has a W/L record of 4–2.

George retirement from professional tennis 2010.

== Fed Cup participation ==
=== Singles ===
Edition	Date	Location	Against	Surface	Opponent	W/L	Score
2004 Fed Cup; Asia/Oceania Zone II	20 April 2004	New Delhi, India	(Kazakhstan) Kazakhstan	Hard	(Kazakhstan) Amina Rakhim	L	0–6, 1–6
2004 Fed Cup; Asia/Oceania Zone II	21 April 2004	New Delhi, India	Turkmenistan	Hard	(Turkmenistan) Almira Hallyeva	W	6–3, 7–6^{(12–10)}
2004 Fed Cup; Asia/Oceania Zone II	22 April 2004	New Delhi, India	Syria	Hard	(Syria) Hazar Sidki	W	6–3, 6–3
2004 Fed Cup; Asia/Oceania Zone II	23 April 2004	New Delhi, India	Singapore	Hard	(Singapore) Lee Wei-ping	L	3–6, 3–6

=== Doubles ===
Edition	Date	Location	Against	Surface	Partner	Opponents	W/L	Score
2004 Fed Cup; Asia/Oceania Zone II	21 April 2004	New Delhi, India	Turkmenistan	Hard	(Pacific Oceania) Angelita Detudamo	(Turkmenistan) Veronika Babayan (Turkmenistan) Almira Hallyeva	W	6–1, 6–2
2004 Fed Cup; Asia/Oceania Zone II	23 April 2004	New Delhi, India	Singapore	Hard	(Pacific Oceania) Gurianna Korinihona	(Singapore) Ng Yun-Ling (Singapore) Tong Pei-Ling	W	6–3, 6–0

== Other finals ==
=== Doubles ===
Outcome	Date	Tournament	Location	Partnered	Opponents	Score
Silver Medal	July 2003	2003 South Pacific Games	Suva, Fiji	(Solomon Islands) Gurianna Korinihona	(Samoa) Maylani Ah Hoy (Samoa) Tagifano So'Onalole	1–6, 3–6

== ITF junior results ==
=== Singles (1/0) ===
Junior Grand Slam
Category GA
Category G1
Category G2
Category G3
Category G4
Category G5

Outcome	No.	Date	Tournament	Location	Surface	Opponent	Score
Winner	1.	25 August 2001	Pacific Oceania Closed Junior Championships	Lautoka, Fiji	Hard	(Solomon Islands) Gurianna Korinihona	6–4, 6–3

=== Doubles (1/0) ===
Junior Grand Slam
Category GA
Category G1
Category G2
Category G3
Category G4
Category G5

Outcome	No.	Date	Tournament	Location	Surface	Partner	Opponents	Score
Winner	1.	25 August 2001	Pacific Oceania Closed Junior Championships	Lautoka, Fiji	Hard	(Solomon Islands) Gurianna Korinihona	(Fiji) Petroena Fong (Vanuatu) Cindy Thomas	6–3, 6–1
