= 1999 Fed Cup Asia/Oceania Zone Group II – Pool A =

Group A of the 1999 Fed Cup Asia/Oceania Zone Group II was one of two pools in the Asia/Oceania Zone Group II of the 1999 Fed Cup. Three teams competed in a round robin competition, with the top two teams qualifying for the play-offs.

	(Singapore) SIN	(Kazakhstan) KAZ	(Malaysia) MAS	RR; W–L	Set; W–L	Game; W–L	Standings
Singapore		2–1	2–1	2–0	9–4	76–54	1
Kazakhstan	1–2		3–0	1–1	8–4	64–35	2
Malaysia	1–2	0–3		0–2	2–11	24–75	3

== Kazakhstan vs. Malaysia ==
Kazakhstan
3
Thana City Golf Club, Samutpakarn, Thailand
23 February 1999
Hard (outdoors)

Malaysia
0

			1	2	3
1	(Kazakhstan) (Malaysia)	Tatiana Babina; Joanna Phang	6; 2	6; 1
2	(Kazakhstan) (Malaysia)	Alissa Velts; Lo Pei-Jyue	6; 2	6; 0
3	(Kazakhstan) (Malaysia)	Tatiana Babina / Alissa Velts; Keng Pei-Yuin / Woo Xer-Li	6; 0	6; 3

== Singapore vs. Kazakhstan ==
Singapore
2
Thana City Golf Club, Samutpakarn, Thailand
24 February 1999
Hard (outdoors)

Kazakhstan
1

			1	2	3
1	(Singapore) (Kazakhstan)	Wong Rui-Jing; Tatiana Babina	7^{8} 6^{6}	6; 3
2	(Singapore) (Kazakhstan)	Leow Yik-Hui; Alissa Velts	0; 6	1; 6
3	(Singapore) (Kazakhstan)	Leong Jil-Lin / Wong Rui-Jing; Tatiana Babina / Alissa Velts	6; 2	7; 5

== Singapore vs. Malaysia ==
Singapore
2
Thana City Golf Club, Samutpakarn, Thailand
25 February 1999
Hard (outdoors)

Malaysia
1

			1	2	3
1	(Singapore) (Malaysia)	Leong Jil-Lin; Joanna Phang	5; 7	6; 0	2; 6
2	(Singapore) (Malaysia)	Wong Rui-Jing; Keng Pei-Yuin	7; 5	6; 1
3	(Singapore) (Malaysia)	Leong Jil-Lin / Wong Rui-Jing; Lo Pei-Jyue / Joanna Phang	6; 1	7^{7} 6^{4}

== See also ==
- Fed Cup structure
