= 1999 Fed Cup World Group II play-offs – Pool B =

Group B of the 1999 Fed Cup World Group II play-offs was one of two pools in the World Group II play-offs of the 1999 Fed Cup. Four teams competed in a round robin competition, with the top team advancing to the final play-off, the winner of which advancing to the 2000 World Group.

| | (Australia) AUS | (Argentina) ARG | (Romania) ROU | (Chinese Taipei) TPE | RR; W–L | Set; W–L | Game; W–L | Standings |
| Australia | | 3–0 | 2–1 | 3–0 | 3–0 | 16–4 | 119–82 | 1 |
| Argentina | 0–3 | | 2–1 | 3–0 | 2–1 | 12–10 | 109–100 | 2 |
| Romania | 1–2 | 1–2 | | 3–0 | 1–2 | 12–10 | 115–99 | 3 |
| Chinese Taipei | 0–3 | 0–3 | 0–3 | | 0–3 | 2–18 | 56–100 | 4 |

== Australia vs. Argentina ==
Australia
3
University Sports Centre, Amsterdam, Netherlands
21 July 1999
Plexipave (outdoors)

Argentina
0

| | | | 1 | 2 | 3 |
|---|---|---|---|---|---|
| 1 | (Australia) (Argentina) | Alicia Molik; Mariana Díaz Oliva | 4; 6 | 6; 2 | 7; 5 |
| 2 | (Australia) (Argentina) | Jelena Dokić; Paola Suárez | 6; 4 | 7; 5 |
| 3 | (Australia) (Argentina) | Catherine Barclay / Nicole Pratt; Laura Montalvo / Paola Suárez | 6; 4 | 6; 4 |

== Romania vs. Chinese Taipei ==
Romania
3
University Sports Centre, Amsterdam, Netherlands
21 July 1999
Plexipave (outdoors)

Chinese Taipei
0

| | | | 1 | 2 | 3 |
|---|---|---|---|---|---|
| 1 | (Romania) (Chinese Taipei) | Cătălina Cristea; Weng Tzu-ting | 6; 0 | 6; 2 |
| 2 | (Romania) (Chinese Taipei) | Ruxandra Dragomir; Wang Shi-ting | 6^{4} 7^{7} | 6; 2 | 6; 2 |
| 3 | (Romania) (Chinese Taipei) | Cătălina Cristea / Ruxandra Dragomir; Hsu Hsueh-li / Wang Shi-ting | 6; 2 | 6; 4 |

== Australia vs. Chinese Taipei ==
Australia
3
University Sports Centre, Amsterdam, Netherlands
22 July 1999
Plexipave (outdoors)

Chinese Taipei
0

| | | | 1 | 2 | 3 |
|---|---|---|---|---|---|
| 1 | (Australia) (Chinese Taipei) | Nicole Pratt; Hsu Hsueh-li | 6; 1 | 6; 2 |
| 2 | (Australia) (Chinese Taipei) | Jelena Dokić; Wang Shi-ting | 6; 4 | 6; 2 |
| 3 | (Australia) (Chinese Taipei) | Catherine Barclay / Alicia Molik; Hsu Hsueh-li / Weng Tzu-ting | 7; 5 | 6; 2 |

== Argentina vs. Romania ==
Argentina
2
University Sports Centre, Amsterdam, Netherlands
22 July 1999
Plexipave (outdoors)

Romania
1

| | | | 1 | 2 | 3 |
|---|---|---|---|---|---|
| 1 | (Argentina) (Romania) | Mariana Díaz Oliva; Raluca Sandu | 5; 7 | 6; 3 | 6; 1 |
| 2 | (Argentina) (Romania) | Paola Suárez; Ruxandra Dragomir | 1; 6 | 7; 5 | 2; 6 |
| 3 | (Argentina) (Romania) | Laura Montalvo / Paola Suárez; Cătălina Cristea / Ruxandra Dragomir | 6; 4 | 7; 5 |

== Australia vs. Romania ==
Australia
2
University Sports Centre, Amsterdam, Netherlands
23 July 1999
Plexipave (outdoors)

Romania
1

| | | | 1 | 2 | 3 |
|---|---|---|---|---|---|
| 1 | (Australia) (Romania) | Nicole Pratt; Cătălina Cristea | 6; 1 | 7; 5 |
| 2 | (Australia) (Romania) | Jelena Dokić; Ruxandra Dragomir | 3; 6 | 5; 7 |
| 3 | (Australia) (Romania) | Catherine Barclay / Alicia Molik; Cătălina Cristea / Ruxandra Dragomir | 7; 5 | 4; 6 | 8; 6 |

== Argentina vs. Chinese Taipei ==
Argentina
3
University Sports Centre, Amsterdam, Netherlands
23 July 1999
Plexipave (outdoors)

Chinese Taipei
0

| | | | 1 | 2 | 3 |
|---|---|---|---|---|---|
| 1 | (Argentina) (Chinese Taipei) | Mariana Díaz Oliva; Weng Tzu-ting | 6; 1 | 6; 2 |
| 2 | (Argentina) (Chinese Taipei) | Paola Suárez; Wang Shi-ting | 3; 6 | 6; 4 | 6; 4 |
| 3 | (Argentina) (Chinese Taipei) | Laura Montalvo / Paola Suárez; Hsu Hsueh-li / Wang Shi-ting | 6; 2 | 6; 2 |

== See also ==
- Fed Cup structure
