= 1999 Fed Cup World Group II play-offs – Pool A =

Group A of the 1999 Fed Cup World Group II play-offs was one of two pools in the World Group II play-offs of the 1999 Fed Cup. Four teams competed in a round robin competition, with the top team advancing to the final play-off, the winner of which advancing to the 2000 World Group.

	(Netherlands) NED	(Belarus) BLR	(Japan) JPN	(Slovenia) SLO	RR; W–L	Set; W–L	Game; W–L	Standings
Netherlands		3–0	2–1	1–2	2–1	14–10	128–118	1
Belarus	0–3		2–0	3–0	2–1	11–10	110–100	2
Japan	1–2	0–2		2–1	1–2	11–10	111–99	3
Slovenia	2–1	0–3	1–2		1–2	9–15	100–132	4

== Netherlands vs. Japan ==
Netherlands
2
University Sports Centre, Amsterdam, Netherlands
21 July 1999
Plexipave (outdoors)

Japan
1

			1	2	3
1	(Netherlands) (Japan)	Miriam Oremans; Miho Saeki	3; 6	4; 6
2	(Netherlands) (Japan)	Kristie Boogert; Ai Sugiyama	2; 6	6; 3	6; 2
3	(Netherlands) (Japan)	Manon Bollegraf / Caroline Vis; Shinobu Asagoe / Ai Sugiyama	4; 6	7^{7} 6^{3}	6; 3

== Belarus vs. Slovenia ==
Belarus
3
University Sports Centre, Amsterdam, Netherlands
21 July 1999
Plexipave (outdoors)

Slovenia
0

			1	2	3
1	(Belarus) (Slovenia)	Olga Barabanschikova; Tina Križan	4; 6	6; 3	6; 1
2	(Belarus) (Slovenia)	Natasha Zvereva; Katarina Srebotnik	7; 5	6; 0
3	(Belarus) (Slovenia)	Olga Barabanschikova / Natasha Zvereva; Tina Križan / Katarina Srebotnik	3; 6	6; 3	6; 1

== Netherlands vs. Belarus ==
Netherlands
2
University Sports Centre, Amsterdam, Netherlands
22 July 1999
Plexipave (outdoors)

Belarus
1

			1	2	3
1	(Netherlands) (Belarus)	Miriam Oremans; Olga Barabanschikova	6; 4	4; 6	7; 5
2	(Netherlands) (Belarus)	Kristie Boogert; Natasha Zvereva	6; 4	6; 4
3	(Netherlands) (Belarus)	Manon Bollegraf / Caroline Vis; Nadejda Ostrovskaya / Tatiana Poutchek	6; 2	6; 2

== Japan vs. Slovenia ==
Japan
2
University Sports Centre, Amsterdam, Netherlands
22 July 1999
Plexipave (outdoors)

Slovenia
1

			1	2	3
1	(Japan) (Slovenia)	Miho Saeki; Tina Pisnik	6; 2	2; 6	5; 7
2	(Japan) (Slovenia)	Ai Sugiyama; Katarina Srebotnik	6; 1	6; 2
3	(Japan) (Slovenia)	Shinobu Asagoe / Ai Sugiyama; Tina Križan / Katarina Srebotnik	6; 2	6; 2

== Netherlands vs. Slovenia ==
Netherlands
1
University Sports Centre, Amsterdam, Netherlands
23 July 1999
Plexipave (outdoors)

Slovenia
2

			1	2	3
1	(Netherlands) (Slovenia)	Miriam Oremans; Tina Pisnik	4; 6	6; 1	7; 9
2	(Netherlands) (Slovenia)	Kristie Boogert; Katarina Srebotnik	2; 6	7^{7} 6^{2}	10; 8
3	(Netherlands) (Slovenia)	Manon Bollegraf / Caroline Vis; Tina Pisnik / Katarina Srebotnik	0; 6	6; 2	7; 9

== Belarus vs. Japan ==
Belarus
2
University Sports Centre, Amsterdam, Netherlands
23 July 1999
Plexipave (outdoors)

Japan
0

			1	2	3
1	(Belarus) (Japan)	Olga Barabanschikova; Yuka Yoshida	6; 4	5; 7	10; 8
2	(Belarus) (Japan)	Natasha Zvereva; Shinobu Asagoe	5; 7	6; 3	7; 5
3	(Belarus) (Japan)

== See also ==
- Fed Cup structure
