= Veronica Widyadharma =

Indonesian tennis player

- Full name: Maria Veronica Widyadharma
- Country (sports): Indonesia
- Born: 9 November 1977 (age 48)
- Prize money: $7,870

Singles
- Career record: 13–28
- Highest ranking: No. 636 (1 May 1995)

Doubles
- Career record: 18–31
- Career titles: 1 ITF
- Highest ranking: No. 429 (20 Nov 1995)
Medal record
Asian Games
Silver medal – second place	1994 Hiroshima	Women's Team
Southeast Asian Games
Gold medal – first place	1993 Singapore	Women's Team
Gold medal – first place	1995 Chiang Mai	Women's Team
Bronze medal – third place	1993 Singapore	Women's Singles
Bronze medal – third place	1995 Chiang Mai	Women's Doubles

Maria Veronica Widyadharma (born 9 November 1977), known as Veronica Widyadharma, is an Indonesian former professional tennis player.

== Tennis career ==
While competing on the professional tour in the early 1990s, Widyadharma reached career high rankings of 636 for singles and 429 for doubles. She featured in her only WTA Tour singles main draw as a wildcard at the 1995 Wismilak Open, held in Surabaya, Indonesia.

Widyadharma didn't play Fed Cup tennis for Indonesia, but did represent her country at both the Asian Games and Southeast Asian Games (SEA Games). Her individual medals at the SEA Games include a bronze for singles in 1993 and she was also a multiple gold medalist in the team event. At the 1994 Asian Games she was a silver medalist in the team event, as an unused player.

In the late 1990s she began playing varsity tennis for the UCF Knights and was a two-time TAAC Player of the Year.

== ITF finals ==
=== Doubles: 2 (1–1) ===
Outcome	No.	Date	Tournament	Surface	Partner	Opponents	Score
Winner	1.	April 1995	Jakarta, Indonesia	Hard	(Indonesia) Agustine Limanto	(South Korea) Kim Soon-nam (South Korea) Kim Ih-sook	4–6, 6–3, 6–4
Runner-up	2.	September 1995	Samut Prakan, Thailand	Hard	(Indonesia) Agustine Limanto	(Thailand) Benjamas Sangaram (Thailand) Tamarine Tanasugarn	5–7, 6–1, 4–6
