= 2001 Fed Cup Asia/Oceania Zone Group II – Pool B =

Group B of the 2001 Fed Cup Asia/Oceania Zone Group II was one of two pools in the Asia/Oceania Zone Group II of the 2001 Fed Cup. Three teams competed in a round robin competition, with the top two teams qualifying for the play-offs.

	(Philippines) PHI	(Malaysia) MAS	(Sri Lanka) SRI	(Syria) SYR	RR; W–L	Set; W–L	Game; W–L	Standings
Philippines		2–1	3–0	3–0	3–0	17–4	112–55	1
Malaysia	1–2		3–0	3–0	2–1	15–6	109–57	2
Sri Lanka	3–0	0–3		3–0	1–2	7–12	68–96	3
Syria	0–3	0–3	0–3		0–3	1–18	31–112	4

== Philippines vs. Malaysia ==
Philippines
2
Kaohsiung, Taiwan
9 April 2001
Rebound Ace (outdoors)

Malaysia
1

			1	2	3
1	(Philippines) (Malaysia)	Czarina-Mae Arévalo; Lai Shareen-Rena	6; 3	3; 6	6; 0
2	(Philippines) (Malaysia)	Jennifer Saret; Liaw Chen-Yee	3; 6	6; 4	6; 0
3	(Philippines) (Malaysia)	Vida Lina Alpuerto / Czarina-Mae Arévalo; Lai Shareen-Rena / Sangaram Shangamitra	6; 4	0; 6	3; 6

== Sri Lanka vs. Syria ==
Sri Lanka
3
Kaohsiung, Taiwan
9 April 2001
Rebound Ace (outdoors)

Syria
0

			1	2	3
1	(Sri Lanka) (Syria)	Shalini Perera; Shaza Tinawi	3; 6	6; 1	6; 1
2	(Sri Lanka) (Syria)	Sobhini De Silva; Farah Dayoub	6; 2	6; 3
3	(Sri Lanka) (Syria)	Vindya Dayananda / Mahesha Seneviratne; Farah Dayoub / Shaza Tinawi	6; 3	7; 5

== Philippines vs. Sri Lanka ==
Philippines
3
Kaohsiung, Taiwan
10 April 2001
Rebound Ace (outdoors)

Sri Lanka
0

			1	2	3
1	(Philippines) (Sri Lanka)	Czarina-Mae Arévalo; Shalini Perera	6; 2	6; 2
2	(Philippines) (Sri Lanka)	Jennifer Saret; Sobhini De Silva	6; 1	6; 3
3	(Philippines) (Sri Lanka)	Czarina-Mae Arévalo / Jennifer Saret; Shalini Perera / Mahesha Seneviratne	7; 5	6; 2

== Malaysia vs. Syria ==
Malaysia
3
Kaohsiung, Taiwan
10 April 2001
Rebound Ace (outdoors)

Syria
0

			1	2	3
1	(Malaysia) (Syria)	Lai Shareen-Rena; Shaza Tinawi	6; 2	6; 2
2	(Malaysia) (Syria)	Liaw Chen-Yee; Farah Dayoub	6; 0	6; 0
3	(Malaysia) (Syria)	Lai Shareen-Rena / Sangaram Shangamitra; Farah Dayoub / Nivin Kezbari	6; 0	6; 1

== Philippines vs. Syria ==
Philippines
3
Kaohsiung, Taiwan
11 April 2001
Rebound Ace (outdoors)

Syria
0

			1	2	3
1	(Philippines) (Syria)	Czarina-Mae Arévalo; Shaza Tinawi	6; 3	6; 0
2	(Philippines) (Syria)	Jennifer Saret; Farah Dayoub	6; 2	6; 0
3	(Philippines) (Syria)	Vida Lina Alpuerto / Jennifer Saret; Farah Dayoub / Shaza Tinawi	6; 0	6; 0

== Malaysia vs. Sri Lanka ==
Malaysia
3
Kaohsiung, Taiwan
11 April 2001
Rebound Ace (outdoors)

Sri Lanka
0

			1	2	3
1	(Malaysia) (Sri Lanka)	Lai Shareen-Rena; Shalini Perera	4; 6	6; 0	6; 3
2	(Malaysia) (Sri Lanka)	Liaw Chen-Yee; Sobhini De Silva	6; 0	4; 1		retired
3	(Malaysia) (Sri Lanka)	Liaw Chen-Yee / Sangaram Shangamitra; Shalini Perera / Mahesha Seneviratne	6; 1	6; 2

== See also ==
- Fed Cup structure
