= Oceania Tennis Federation =

Regional federation of national tennis organizations in Oceania

- Member nations of Oceania Tennis Federation

- Sport: Tennis
- Jurisdiction: Regional
- Abbreviation: (OTF)
- Founded: 1993
- Affiliation: International Tennis Federation
- Affiliation date: 1993
- President: Cyrille MAINGUY (Vanuatu)
- Board members: Bruce Osborne (Australia), Davina Hosking (Cook Islands), Torgun Smith (Guam), Florence Wasko (American Samoa), Barbara Stubbings (Papua New Guinea), Vicky Reid (Australia), Terri-Ann Scorer (New Zealand), Gary Purcell (ITF Development Officer – Pacific Oceania)
- CEO: David Smith (New Zealand) & Richard Breen (Fiji))
- Sponsor

Official website
- www.oceaniatennis.com

Oceania Tennis Federation (OTF) is the regional governing body of tennis in Oceania. It was formed as a regional association of International Tennis Federation in 1993 with seven member nations to foster the development of tennis in the Oceania region specially main focus on small island nations (territories/dependencies) and Papua New Guinea as the structure of tennis in both Australia and New Zealand was already well developed. The organisation started with seven members now have twenty-one countries in its members list.

== Member nations ==
Oceania Tennis Federation has 20 full-time member nations and one New Caledonia associate member. This is an alphabetically ordered list of full members of OTF:

Country	Association	Headquarter
American Samoa	American Samoa Tennis Association	Pago Pago
Australia	Tennis Australia	Melbourne
Cook Islands	Cook Islands Tennis	Rarotonga
Fiji	Fiji Tennis Association	Lautoka
Guam	Guam National Tennis Federation	Agana
Kiribati	Kiribati Tennis Association	Tarawa
Federated States of Micronesia	Micronesia Tennis Association	Pohnpei
Nauru	Nauru Tennis Association	Nauru
New Caledonia	Ligue Caledonienne de Tennis (Associate member's)	Nouméa
New Zealand	Tennis New Zealand	Auckland
Norfolk Island	Norfolk Islands Tennis Association	Kingston
Northern Mariana Islands	Northern Mariana Islands Tennis Association	Saipan
Palau	Palau Tennis Federation	Koror
Papua New Guinea	Papua New Guinea Lawn Tennis Association	Port Moresby
Samoa	Samoa Tennis Association	Apia
Solomon Islands	Solomon Islands Tennis Association	Honiara
Tahiti	Tahitian Tennis Federation	Papeete
Tonga	Tonga Tennis Association	Nuku Alofa
Tuvalu	Tuvalu Tennis Association	Funafuti
Vanuatu	Vanuatu Tennis Federation	Port Vila

== ANZ Schools plan ==
In 1994 OTF President Geoff Pollard initiated a program allowing more children to play tennis at school level; OTF player development and marketing consultant Barry McMillan reached to ANZ Banking Group with this scheme for financial support. ANZ group agreed to this deal to sponsor a tennis in schools program in Pacific Island nations.

== See also ==
- Pacific Oceania Billie Jean King Cup team
- Pacific Oceania Davis Cup team
