= Madina Rakhim =

Kazakhstani tennis player

- Country (sports): Kazakhstan
- Born: 9 April 1985 (age 39); Karaganda, Kazakhstan
- Height: 5 ft 9 in (175 cm)
- Plays: Right-handed
Medal record
Universiade
| Silver medal – second place | 2007 Bangkok | Women's doubles |

Madina Rakhim (Russian: Мадина Рахим; born 9 April 1985) is a Kazakhstani former tennis player. She is an elder sister of professional player Amina.

== Biography ==
Rakhim, a right-handed player, made her debut for the Kazakhstan Fed Cup team in 2004, appearing in four ties.

From 2006 to 2007, she played college tennis in the United States for Wichita State and became only their second ever female to compete in the NCAA Division I Singles Championship.

At the 2007 Summer Universiade in Bangkok, Rakhim and sister Amina were runners-up to Chinese Taipei's Chan Yung-jan and Chuang Chia-jung in the women's doubles, to claim a silver medal for Kazakhstan.

In 2008, she featured in another four Fed Cup ties for her national team. She finished her Fed Cup career having lost only one of her four singles rubbers and in partnership with her sister was unbeaten in four doubles rubbers.

== ITF Circuit finals ==
=== Doubles: 1 (0–1) ===
| Outcome | Date | Category | Tournament | Surface | Partner | Opponents | Score |
|---|---|---|---|---|---|---|---|
| Runner-up | July 22, 2007 | $10,000 | Wichita, United States | Hard (o) | (Russia) Anna Egorova | (United States) Jennifer Elie (Croatia) Jelena Pandžić | 2–6, 6–3, 1–6 |
