= 2002 Fed Cup World Group play-offs =

Part of tennis tournament

The 2002 World Group play-offs decided which nations featured in World Group in the 2003 Fed Cup. The play-off winners went on to feature in World Group in 2003, while the losing nations joined Zonal Competition for 2003.

== Australia vs. Netherlands ==
Australia
3
WIN Sports Centre, Wollongong, Australia
20–21 July 2002
Plexipave (indoors)

Netherlands
2

			1	2	3
1	(Australia) (Netherlands)	Evie Dominikovic; Miriam Oremans	4; 6	3; 6
2	(Australia) (Netherlands)	Alicia Molik; Kristie Boogert	1; 6	6; 2	10; 8
3	(Australia) (Netherlands)	Alicia Molik; Miriam Oremans	6; 2	6; 3
4	(Australia) (Netherlands)	Evie Dominikovic; Kristie Boogert	5; 7	7; 5	1; 6
5	(Australia) (Netherlands)	Alicia Molik / Rennae Stubbs; Kristie Boogert / Miriam Oremans	7^{7} 6^{1}	7^{7} 6^{4}

== Sweden vs. Switzerland ==
Sweden
3
Malmö IP, Milan, Sweden
20–21 July 2002
Red clay (outdoors)

Switzerland
2

			1	2	3
1	(Sweden) (Switzerland)	Sofia Arvidsson; Patty Schnyder	6; 2	6; 2
2	(Sweden) (Switzerland)	Åsa Svensson; Myriam Casanova	6; 2	6; 4
3	(Sweden) (Switzerland)	Åsa Svensson; Patty Schnyder	6^{4} 7^{7}	7; 5	6; 8
4	(Sweden) (Switzerland)	Sofia Arvidsson; Myriam Casanova	0; 6	2; 6
5	(Sweden) (Switzerland)	Sofia Arvidsson / Åsa Svensson; Myriam Casanova / Patty Schnyder	3; 6	6; 3	7; 5

== Hungary vs. Argentina ==
Hungary
0
Római Teniszakadémia, Budapest, Hungary
20–21 July 2002
Red clay (outdoors)

Argentina
5

			1	2	3
1	(Hungary) (Argentina)	Petra Mandula; Mariana Díaz Oliva	5; 7	2; 6
2	(Hungary) (Argentina)	Zsófia Gubacsi; Clarisa Fernández	6; 4	5; 7	1; 6
3	(Hungary) (Argentina)	Petra Mandula; Clarisa Fernández	5; 7	6; 2	4; 6
4	(Hungary) (Argentina)	Zsófia Gubacsi; Mariana Díaz Oliva	6; 5	5; 7	3; 6
5	(Hungary) (Argentina)	Anikó Kapros / Kira Nagy; Mariana Díaz Oliva / Laura Montalvo	6; 3	4; 6	0; 6

== United States vs. Israel ==
United States
5
Cooper Tennis Complex, Springfield, MO, United States
20–21 July 2002
Hard (outdoors)

Israel
0

			1	2	3
1	(United States) (Israel)	Lindsay Davenport; Anna Smashnova	6; 3	6; 3
2	(United States) (Israel)	Monica Seles; Tzipora Obziler	6; 4	6; 2
3	(United States) (Israel)	Monica Seles; Anna Smashnova	6; 4	6; 0
4	(United States) (Israel)	Lindsay Davenport; Tzipora Obziler	2; 6	6; 1	7^{7} 6^{1}
5	(United States) (Israel)	Lisa Raymond / Meghann Shaughnessy; Tzipora Obziler / Hila Rosen	6; 3	6; 0

== Czech Republic vs. Canada ==
Czech Republic
5
TC Precolor Přerov, Přerov, Czech Republic
20–21 July 2002
Red clay (outdoors)

Canada
0

			1	2	3
1	(Czech Republic) (Canada)	Barbora Strýcová; Maureen Drake	6; 1	6; 0
2	(Czech Republic) (Canada)	Klára Koukalová; Marie-Ève Pelletier	4; 6	6; 3	6; 4
3	(Czech Republic) (Canada)	Klára Koukalová; Jana Nejedly	6; 3	6; 3
4	(Czech Republic) (Canada)	Iveta Benešová; Marie-Ève Pelletier	2; 6	6; 1	7^{7} 6^{1}
5	(Czech Republic) (Canada)	Petra Cetkovská / Barbora Strýcová; Marie-Ève Pelletier / Vanessa Webb	6; 2	6; 3

== China vs. Russia ==
China
0
Beijing International Tennis Center, Beijing, China
20–21 July 2002
Hard (indoors)

Russia
5

			1	2	3
1	(China) (Russia)	Zheng Jie; Tatiana Panova	3; 6	1; 6
2	(China) (Russia)	Sun Tiantian; Elena Dementieva	2; 6	3; 6
3	(China) (Russia)	Zheng Jie; Elena Dementieva	4; 6	0; 6
4	(China) (Russia)	Li Na; Elena Bovina	0; 6	2; 6
5	(China) (Russia)	Yan Zi / Zheng Jie; Elena Bovina / Tatiana Panova	3; 6	6^{3} 7^{7}

== Colombia vs. Japan ==
Japan was scheduled to play against Colombia on 20–21 July in Bogotá, but the Japanese withdrew from their tie citing security concerns over the Colombian armed conflict. Colombia thus progressed to the 2003 World Group, while Japan was relegated to Zonal Competition.

== Slovenia vs. Ukraine ==
Slovenia
4
SRC Marina Portorož, Portorož, Slovenia
20–21 July 2002
Red clay (outdoors)

Ukraine
1

			1	2	3
1	(Slovenia) (Ukraine)	Maja Matevžič; Tatiana Perebiynis	6; 3	6; 2
2	(Slovenia) (Ukraine)	Tina Pisnik; Yuliya Beygelzimer	6; 2	3; 6	6; 2
3	(Slovenia) (Ukraine)	Tina Pisnik; Tatiana Perebiynis	7^{7} 6^{3}	4; 6	6; 3
4	(Slovenia) (Ukraine)	Maja Matevžič; Yuliya Beygelzimer	6; 3	7^{7} 6^{2}
5	(Slovenia) (Ukraine)	Ajda Brumen / Petra Rampre; Yuliya Beygelzimer / Tatiana Perebiynis	3; 6	3; 6

== See also ==
- Fed Cup structure
