= Archana Reddy =

Fijian tennis player

- Country (sports): Fiji
- Born: 5 June 1980 (age 44); Lautoka, Fiji

Singles
- Career record: 3/8

Doubles
- Career record: 2/5

Archana Reddy (born 5 July 1980) is a former Fijian female tennis player. She made her international debut in 1999 by representing Fiji in Fed Cup at the age of 19. Reddy is considered as the best woman tennis player to play for Fiji.

She holds the record by winning the most singles, doubles for Fijian Fed Cup team.

== ITF Junior finals ==
Grand Slam
Category GA
Category G1
Category G2
Category G3
Category G4
Category G5

=== Singles (0–2) ===
Outcome	No.	Date	Tournament	Surface	Opponent	Score
Runner-up	1.	7 September 1996	Apia, Samoa	Hard	(Samoa) Tagifano So'Onalole	0–6, 1–6
Runner-up	2.	9 September 1997	Nadi, Fiji	Hard	(American Samoa) Davilyn Godinet	3–6, 1–6
