= Agustine Limanto =

Indonesian-Singaporean tennis player

- Country (sports): Indonesia; Singapore
- Born: 4 August 1978 (age 47)
- Prize money: $10,213

Singles
- Career record: 16–43
- Highest ranking: No. 580 (9 Oct 1995)

Doubles
- Career record: 15–36
- Career titles: 1 ITF
- Highest ranking: No. 429 (20 Nov 1995)

Agustine Limanto (born 4 August 1978) is an Indonesian-Singaporean former professional tennis player.

Limanto, who had a best ranking of 580 in the world, appeared in two WTA Tour singles main draws, both in her native Indonesia. She debuted as a lucky loser at the 1995 Wismilak Open and featured as a wildcard entry at the 1996 Danamon Open. Her best ranking in doubles was 429 and she won one ITF doubles title.

After being granted Singaporean permanent residency in December 2000, Limanto played Fed Cup tennis for Singapore over the next two years, competing on Asia/Oceania Zone Group II. She had a 2/5 overall career record, with both of her two wins in singles rubbers.

== ITF finals ==
=== Doubles: 2 (1–1) ===
Outcome	No.	Date	Tournament	Surface	Partner	Opponents	Score
Winner	1.	April 1995	Jakarta, Indonesia	Hard	(Indonesia) Veronica Widyadharma	(South Korea) Kim Soon-nam (South Korea) Kim Ih-sook	4–6, 6–3, 6–4
Runner-up	.	September 1995	Samut Prakan, Thailand	Hard	(Indonesia) Veronica Widyadharma	(Thailand) Benjamas Sangaram (Thailand) Tamarine Tanasugarn	5–7, 6–1, 4–6
