= Kamila Dadakhodjaeva =

Uzbekistani tennis player

- Country (sports): Uzbekistan
- Born: 6 October 1983 (age 41); Tashkent, Uzbekistan
- Plays: Right-handed
- Prize money: $1,685

Singles
- Career record: 0–3

Doubles
- Career record: 0–1

Kamila Dadakhodjaeva (born 6 October 1983) is an Uzbekistani former tennis player.

Born in Tashkent, Dadakhodjaeva was a playing member of Uzbekistan's Fed Cup side between 1999 and 2002, appearing in a total of eight ties. She featured in the singles and doubles main draws of the 2000 Tashkent Open.

Dadakhodjaeva played collegiate tennis for Auburn University at Montgomery.
