= 1999 Fed Cup =

International women's tennis competition

Details
- Duration: 17 April – 19 September
- Edition: 37th

Achievements (singles)

The 1999 Fed Cup was the 37th edition of the most important competition between national teams in women's tennis. In the finals, the United States defeated Russia at Taube Tennis Stadium in Stanford, CA, United States, on 18–19 September, giving the Americans their 16th title.

== World Group ==
=== Participating teams ===
- Croatia
- France
- Italy
- Russia
- Slovakia
- Spain
- Switzerland
- United States

=== Draw ===
Quarterfinals; 17–18 April
Reggio Calabria, Italy (Indoor carpet)
1 | Spain | 2
Italy | 3
Raleigh, NC, United States (Outdoor clay)
Croatia | 0
4 | United States | 5
Moscow, Russia (Indoor carpet)
3 | France | 2
Russia | 3
Zürich, Switzerland (Indoor carpet)
Slovakia | 5
2 | Switzerland | 0

Semifinals; 24–25 July
Ancona, Italy (Outdoor clay)
Italy | 1
4 | United States | 4
Moscow, Russia (Indoor clay)
Russia | 3
Slovakia | 2

Final; 18–19 September
Stanford, CA, United States (Outdoor hard)
4 | United States | 4
Russia | 1

== World Group II ==
The World Group II was the second highest level of Fed Cup competition in 1999. Winners advanced to the World Group for 2000, and losers played in the World Group II play-offs.

Date: 17–18 April

| Venue | Surface | Home team | Score | Visiting team |
|---|---|---|---|---|
| 's-Hertogenbosch, Netherlands | Indoor carpet | Netherlands | 0–5 | Belgium |
| Minsk, Belarus | Indoor clay | Belarus | 1–4 | Czech Republic |
| Klagenfurt, Austria | Outdoor clay | Austria | 3–2 | Australia |
| Hamburg, Germany | Outdoor clay | Germany | 3–2 | Japan |

== World Group II play-offs ==
The four losing teams from World Group II (Australia, Belarus, Japan and Netherlands) were divided into two pools of four with qualifiers from Zonal Group I. Two teams qualified from Europe/Africa Zone (Romania and Slovenia), one team from the Asia/Oceania Zone (Chinese Taipei), and one team from the Americas Zone (Argentina).

The two top teams from each pool played-off against each other, with the winner promoted to 2000 World Group. All other teams were relegated to Zonal Competition in 2000.

Venue: University Sports Centre, Amsterdam, Netherlands (outdoor hard)

Dates: 21–24 July

=== Pools ===
| | Pool A | NED | BLR | JPN | SLO |
| 1 | Netherlands (2–1) | | 3–0 | 2–1 | 1–2 |
| 2 | Belarus (2–1) | 0–3 | | 2–0 | 3–0 |
| 3 | Japan (1–2) | 1–2 | 0–2 | | 2–1 |
| 4 | Slovenia (1–2) | 2–1 | 0–3 | 1–2 | |

| | Pool B | AUS | ARG | ROU | TPE |
| 1 | Australia (3–0) | | 3–0 | 2–1 | 3–0 |
| 2 | Argentina (2–1) | 0–3 | | 2–1 | 3–0 |
| 3 | Romania (1–2) | 1–2 | 1–2 | | 3–0 |
| 4 | Chinese Taipei (0–3) | 0–3 | 0–3 | 0–3 | |

=== Play-off ===
Netherlands
0
University Sports Centre, Amsterdam, Netherlands
24 July 1999
Plexipave (outdoors)

Australia
2

| | | | 1 | 2 | 3 |
|---|---|---|---|---|---|---|
| 1 | (Netherlands) (Australia) | Miriam Oremans; Nicole Pratt | 4; 6 | 6; 3 | 8; 10 |
| 2 | (Netherlands) (Australia) | Kristie Boogert; Jelena Dokić | 5; 7 | 2; 6 |
| 3 | (Netherlands) (Australia) | | | | | not played |

== Americas Zone ==
- Nations in **bold** advanced to the higher level of competition.
- Nations in italics were relegated down to a lower level of competition.

=== Group I ===
Venue: Buenos Aires T.C., Buenos Aires, Argentina (outdoor clay)

Dates: 13–18 April

==== Participating teams ====
- **Argentina**
- Brazil
- Canada
- Chile
- Colombia
- Ecuador
- Mexico
- Paraguay
- Puerto Rico
- Venezuela

=== Group II ===
Venue: Costa Rica Country Club, San José, Costa Rica (outdoor hard)

Dates: 23–27 February

==== Participating teams ====
- Antigua and Barbuda
- Bahamas
- Barbados
- Bermuda
- Bolivia
- Costa Rica
- **Cuba**
- Dominican Republic
- El Salvador
- Guatemala
- Haiti
- Jamaica
- Panama
- Peru
- Trinidad and Tobago
- **Uruguay**

== Asia/Oceania Zone ==
- Nations in **bold** advanced to the higher level of competition.
- Nations in italics were relegated down to a lower level of competition.

=== Group I ===
Venue: Thana City Golf Club, Samutpakarn, Thailand (outdoor hard)

Dates: 22–27 February

==== Participating teams ====
- China
- **Chinese Taipei**
- Hong Kong
- India
- Indonesia
- New Zealand
- Pacific Oceania
- South Korea
- Thailand
- Uzbekistan

=== Group II ===
Venue: Thana City Golf Club, Samutpakarn, Thailand (outdoor hard)

Dates: 22–26 February

==== Participating teams ====
- Fiji
- **Kazakhstan**
- Malaysia
- Pakistan
- **Singapore**
- Syria
- Tajikistan

== Europe/Africa Zone ==
- Nations in **bold** advanced to the higher level of competition.
- Nations in italics were relegated down to a lower level of competition.

=== Group I ===
Venue: La Manga Club, Murcia, Spain (outdoor clay)

Dates: 19–23 April

==== Participating teams ====
- Bulgaria
- Denmark
- Finland
- Georgia
- Great Britain
- Greece
- Latvia
- Luxembourg
- Poland
- Portugal
- **Romania**
- **Slovenia**
- South Africa
- Sweden
- Ukraine
- Yugoslavia

=== Group II ===
Venue: La Manga Club, Murcia, Spain (outdoor clay)

Dates: 26–30 April

==== Participating teams ====
- Algeria
- Armenia
- Bosnia and Herzegovina
- Botswana
- Cyprus
- Egypt
- Estonia
- **Hungary**
- Iceland
- Ireland
- **Israel**
- Kenya
- Lithuania
- Macedonia
- Madagascar
- Malta
- Moldova
- **Morocco**
- Tunisia
- **Turkey**
