= Pacific Oceania Billie Jean King Cup team =

Pacific Oceania
- Captain: William O'Connell
- ITF ranking: 91 ▼9 (19 April 2022)
- First year: 1995
- Years played: 15
- Ties played (W–L): 57 (25–32)
- Best finish: Zonal Group I RR (1999, 2001)
- Most total wins: Tagifano So'Onalole (16–19)
- Most singles wins: Tagifano So'Onalole (11–10)
- Most doubles wins: Gurianna Korinihona (6–2)
- Best doubles team: Davilyn Godinet / Gurianna Korinihona (2–0); Nicole Angat / Davilyn Godinet (2–2); Sylvia Lokollo / Tagifano So'Onalole (2–2)
- Most ties played: Tagifano So'Onalole (22)
- Most years played: Tagifano So'Onalole (6)

The Pacific Oceania Fed Cup team represents the island nations of Oceania in Fed Cup tennis competition and are governed by the Oceania Tennis Federation. In 2015 they took part in Fed Cup competition for the first time in ten years.

== Current team ==
The 2022 Fed Cup roster for Pacific Oceania.

- (Papua New Guinea) Patricia Apisah
- (Papua New Guinea) Violet Apisah
- (American Samoa) Kalani Soli
- (Papua New Guinea) Abigail Tere-Apisah

== History ==
Pacific Oceania competed in its first Fed Cup in 1995. Their best result was reaching Group I in 1999, 2001, and 2019.

== Nations represented ==
- American Samoa
- Cook Islands
- Fiji
- Nauru
- New Caledonia
- Northern Mariana Islands (until 2023)
- Palau
- Papua New Guinea
- Samoa
- Solomon Islands

== Former squad members ==
Active players listed in bold

Player	Total W–L	Singles W–L	Doubles W–L	Number of ties	First year played	Years played
(Samoa) Maylani Ah Hoy	2–3	1–2	1–1	3	2003	1
(Papua New Guinea) Nicole Angat	2–7	1–4	2–3	7	2000	2
(Samoa) **Steffi Carruthers**	4–6	3–4	1–2	7	2015	2
(Nauru) Angelita Detudamo	2–1	0–0	2–1	3	2004	1
(Solomon Islands) Irene George	4–2	2–2	2–0	5	2003	2
(American Samoa) Davilyn Godinet	11–16	6–8	5–8	18	1998	5
(Solomon Islands) Gurianna Korinihona	11–8	5–6	6–2	11	2002	3
(Fiji) Sylvia Lokollo	2–2	0–0	2–2	4	1995	2
(Northern Mariana Islands) Irene Mani	1–3	0–0	1–3	4	2001	2
(Palau) **Ayana Rengiil**	3–0	1–0	2–0	2	2016	1
(Cook Islands) Paiao-Asinata Short	2–7	2–4	0–3	8	1998	2
(Samoa) Tagifano So'Onalole	16–19	11–10	5–9	23	1995	6
(Cook Islands) Brittany Teei	2–1	0–0	2–1	3	2015	1
(Papua New Guinea) **Abigail Tere-Apisah**	6–4	5–1	1–3	6	2015	2
(Papua New Guinea) Vera Tere	0–3	0–1	0–2	2	1997	1
(Fiji) Adriana Thaggard	1–8	0–5	1–3	7	1995	3
(Cook Islands) Simone Wichman	3–6	2–3	1–3	7	1996	3
(New Caledonia) **Mayka Zima**	3–1	1–1	2–0	3	2016	1

== See also ==
- Billie Jean King Cup
- Pacific Oceania Davis Cup team
