= Fiji Fed Cup team =

Fijian women's tennis team

Fiji
- First year: 1999
- Years played: 3
- Titles: 0

The Fiji Fed Cup team represented Fiji in Fed Cup (known as the Billie Jean King Cup since 2020) tennis competition and was governed by the Fiji Tennis Association. They last competed in 2001.

== History ==
Fiji competed in its first Fed Cup in 1999. Fiji started competing as part of the Pacific Oceania team. Their best result was finishing sixth in Group II in 1999. However they last competed in 2001.

== See also ==
- Billie Jean King Cup
