= Syria Billie Jean King Cup team =

- First year: 1994

The Syria Billie Jean King Cup team represents Syria in the Billie Jean King Cup tennis competition and are governed by the Syrian Arab Tennis Federation. They have not competed since 2010.

== History ==
Syria competed in its first Fed Cup in 1994. Their best result was third in Group II in 2005.

== See also ==
- Billie Jean King Cup
- Syria Davis Cup team
