= 2000 Fed Cup Asia/Oceania Zone Group I – Pool B =

Group B of the 2000 Fed Cup Europe/Africa Zone Group II was one of two pools in the Asia/Oceania Zone Group I of the 2000 Fed Cup. Five teams competed in a round robin competition, with the top team advancing to the Group I play-off, the winner of which would advance to World Group II Play-offs, and the bottom team being relegated down to 2000 Group II.

	(China) CHN	(Indonesia) INA	(Chinese Taipei) TPE	(South Korea) KOR	(New Zealand) NZL	(Singapore) SIN	Match; W–L	Set; W–L	Game; W–L	Standings
China		2–0	3–0	2–1	3–0	2–0	5–0	22–5	151–72	1
Indonesia	0–2		2–1	2–0	3–0	3–0	4–1	21–7	146–69	2
Chinese Taipei	0–3	1–2		2–1	2–1	3–0	3–2	19–12	129–125	3
South Korea	1–2	0–2	1–2		3–0	3–0	2–3	17–15	149–116	4
New Zealand	0–3	0–3	1–2	0–3		3–0	1–4	10–23	119–155	5
Singapore	0–2	0–3	0–3	0–3	0–3		0–5	0–28	11–168	6

== China vs. South Korea ==
China
2
Utsubo Tennis Center, Osaka, Japan
25 April 2000
Decoturf (outdoors)

South Korea
1

			1	2	3
1	(China) (South Korea)	Li Na; Choi Jin-young	6; 3	6; 3
2	(China) (South Korea)	Yi Jing-Qian; Cho Yoon-jeong	6; 3	6; 1
3	(China) (South Korea)	Li Na / Li Ting; Chae Kyung-yee / Cho Yoon-jeong	2; 6	2; 6

== Indonesia vs. New Zealand ==
Indonesia
3
Utsubo Tennis Center, Osaka, Japan
25 April 2000
Decoturf (outdoors)

New Zealand
0

			1	2	3
1	(Indonesia) (New Zealand)	Yayuk Basuki; Rewa Hudson	6; 0	6; 1
2	(Indonesia) (New Zealand)	Wynne Prakusya; Leanne Baker	6; 2	7^{9} 6^{7}
3	(Indonesia) (New Zealand)	Yayuk Basuki / Wynne Prakusya; Rewa Hudson / Shelley Stephens	6; 4	6; 2

== Chinese Taipei vs. Singapore ==
Chinese Taipei
3
Utsubo Tennis Center, Osaka, Japan
25 April 2000
Decoturf (outdoors)

Singapore
0

			1	2	3
1	(Chinese Taipei) (Singapore)	Tai Lan-lan; Tina Jacob	6; 1	6; 2
2	(Chinese Taipei) (Singapore)	Janet Lee; Leow Yik-Hui	6; 1	6; 0
3	(Chinese Taipei) (Singapore)	Janet Lee / Wang Shi-ting; Simin Liu / Leow Yik-Hui	6; 0	6; 0

== China vs. Singapore ==
China
2
Utsubo Tennis Center, Osaka, Japan
26 April 2000
Decoturf (outdoors)

Singapore
0

			1	2	3
1	(China) (Singapore)	Li Na; Tina Jacob	6; 0	6; 1
2	(China) (Singapore)	Yi Jing-Qian; Leow Yik-Hui	6; 0	6; 0
3	(China) (Singapore)	Li Na / Li Fang; Leow Yik-Hui / Simin Liu				not played

== Indonesia vs. South Korea ==
Indonesia
2
Utsubo Tennis Center, Osaka, Japan
26 April 2000
Decoturf (outdoors)

South Korea
0

			1	2	3
1	(Indonesia) (South Korea)	Yayuk Basuki; Choi Jin-young	6; 2	6; 2
2	(Indonesia) (South Korea)	Wynne Prakusya; Cho Yoon-jeong	3; 6	7^{7} 6^{4}	6; 4
3	(Indonesia) (South Korea)	Yayuk Basuki / Wynne Prakusya; Chae Kyung-yee / Cho Yoon-jeong				not played

== Chinese Taipei vs. New Zealand ==
Chinese Taipei
2
Utsubo Tennis Center, Osaka, Japan
26 April 2000
Decoturf (outdoors)

New Zealand
1

			1	2	3
1	(Chinese Taipei) (New Zealand)	Tai Lan-lan; Niki Tippins	3; 6	6; 3	4; 6
2	(Chinese Taipei) (New Zealand)	Janet Lee; Leanne Baker	6; 2	6; 4
3	(Chinese Taipei) (New Zealand)	Janet Lee / Wang Shi-ting; Leanne Baker / Shelley Stephens	7^{7} 6^{2}	6; 3

== China vs. Indonesia ==
China
2
Utsubo Tennis Center, Osaka, Japan
27 April 2000
Decoturf (outdoors)

Indonesia
0

			1	2	3
1	(China) (Indonesia)	Li Na; Yayuk Basuki	5; 7	6; 1	6; 2
2	(China) (Indonesia)	Yi Jing-Qian; Wynne Prakusya	6; 4	6; 1
3	(China) (Indonesia)	Li Fang / Li Na; Yayuk Basuki / Wynne Prakusya				not played

== Chinese Taipei vs. South Korea ==
Chinese Taipei
2
Utsubo Tennis Center, Osaka, Japan
27 April 2000
Decoturf (outdoors)

South Korea
1

			1	2	3
1	(Chinese Taipei) (South Korea)	Tai Lan-lan; Chung Yang-jin	1; 6	6; 4	1; 6
2	(Chinese Taipei) (South Korea)	Janet Lee; Chae Kyung-yee	6; 3	6; 2
3	(Chinese Taipei) (South Korea)	Janet Lee / Wang Shi-ting; Chae Kyung-yee / Cho Yoon-jeong	7; 5	6; 4

== New Zealand vs. Singapore ==
New Zealand
3
Utsubo Tennis Center, Osaka, Japan
27 April 2000
Decoturf (outdoors)

Singapore
0

			1	2	3
1	(New Zealand) (Singapore)	Niki Tippins; Simin Liu	6; 0	6; 0
2	(New Zealand) (Singapore)	Leanne Baker; Leow Yik-Hui	6; 0	6; 0
3	(New Zealand) (Singapore)	Rewa Hudson / Shelley Stephens; Tina Jacob / Leow Yik-Hui	6; 0	6; 0

== China vs. New Zealand ==
China
3
Utsubo Tennis Center, Osaka, Japan
28 April 2000
Decoturf (outdoors)

New Zealand
0

			1	2	3
1	(China) (New Zealand)	Li Na; Niki Tippins	6; 2	6; 0
2	(China) (New Zealand)	Yi Jing-Qian; Leanne Baker	6; 3	6; 3
3	(China) (New Zealand)	Li Fang / Li Na; Leanne Baker / Shelley Stephens	6; 1	3; 6	6; 3

== Indonesia vs. Chinese Taipei ==
Indonesia
2
Utsubo Tennis Center, Osaka, Japan
28 April 2000
Decoturf (outdoors)

Chinese Taipei
1

			1	2	3
1	(Indonesia) (Chinese Taipei)	Irawati Iskandar; Tsai Ya-Fang	6; 0	6; 4
2	(Indonesia) (Chinese Taipei)	Wynne Prakusya; Janet Lee	4; 6	2; 6
3	(Indonesia) (Chinese Taipei)	Yayuk Basuki / Wynne Prakusya; Janet Lee / Wang Shi-ting	6; 1	6; 2

== South Korea vs. Singapore ==
South Korea
3
Utsubo Tennis Center, Osaka, Japan
28 April 2000
Decoturf (outdoors)

Singapore
0

			1	2	3
1	(South Korea) (Singapore)	Choi Jin-young; Tina Jacob	6; 0	6; 0
2	(South Korea) (Singapore)	Chung Yang-jin; Leow Yik-Hui	6; 1	6; 0
3	(South Korea) (Singapore)	Chae Kyung-yee / Cho Yoon-jeong; Simin Liu / Leow Yik-Hui	6; 0	6; 0

== China vs. Chinese Taipei ==
China
3
Utsubo Tennis Center, Osaka, Japan
29 April 2000
Decoturf (outdoors)

Chinese Taipei
0

			1	2	3
1	(China) (Chinese Taipei)	Li Na; Tai Lan-lan	6; 2	6; 0
2	(China) (Chinese Taipei)	Yi Jing-Qian; Janet Lee	6; 4	4; 6	6; 4
3	(China) (Chinese Taipei)	Li Na / Li Fang; Tai Lan-lan / Tsai Ya-fang	3; 0			retired

== Indonesia vs. Singapore ==
Indonesia
2
Utsubo Tennis Center, Osaka, Japan
29 April 2000
Decoturf (outdoors)

Singapore
0

			1	2	3
1	(Indonesia) (Singapore)	Wukirasih Sawondari; Tina Jacob	6; 0	6; 0
2	(Indonesia) (Singapore)	Irawati Iskandar; Leow Yik-Hui	6; 1	6; 2
3	(Indonesia) (Singapore)	Irawati Iskandar / Wukirasih Sawondari; Tina Jacob / Leow Yik-Hui	6; 2	6; 0

== South Korea vs. New Zealand ==
South Korea
3
Utsubo Tennis Center, Osaka, Japan
29 April 2000
Decoturf (outdoors)

New Zealand
0

			1	2	3
1	(South Korea) (New Zealand)	Chae Kyung-yee; Niki Tippins	6; 0	6; 2
2	(South Korea) (New Zealand)	Cho Yoon-jeong; Leanne Baker	6; 2	4; 6	6; 0
3	(South Korea) (New Zealand)	Chae Kyung-yee / Cho Yoon-jeong; Leanne Baker / Shelley Stephens	6; 4	7^{7} 6^{4}

- Singapore failed to win any ties in the pool, and thus was relegated to Group II in 2001, where they finished fourth overall.

== See also ==
- Fed Cup structure
