= 2001 Fed Cup Asia/Oceania Zone Group I – Pool A =

Group A of the 2001 Fed Cup Asia/Oceania Zone Group I was one of two pools in the Asia/Oceania Zone Group I of the 2001 Fed Cup. Five teams competed in a round robin competition, with the top team advancing to the Group I play-off, the winner of which would advance to World Group II Play-offs, and the bottom team being relegated down to 2002 Group II.

	(Indonesia) INA	(South Korea) KOR	(India) IND	(New Zealand) NZL	(Pacific Oceania) POC	RR; W–L	Set; W–L	Game; W–L	Standings
Indonesia		2–1	3–0	3–0	3–0	4–0	22–3	149–70	1
South Korea	1–2		1–2	2–1	3–0	2–2	15–11	134–97	2
India	0–3	2–1		1–2	3–0	2–2	15–12	131–122	3
New Zealand	0–3	1–2	2–1		3–0	2–2	12–14	105–115	4
Pacific Oceania	0–3	0–3	0–3	0–3		0–4	0–24	29–144	5

== Pacific Oceania vs. Indonesia ==
Pacific Oceania
0
Kaohsiung, Taiwan
9 April 2001
Rebound Ace (outdoors)

Indonesia
3

			1	2	3
1	(Pacific Oceania) (Indonesia)	Nicole Angat; Romana Tedjakusuma	0; 6	0; 6
2	(Pacific Oceania) (Indonesia)	Davilyn Godinet; Wynne Prakusya	0; 6	3; 6
3	(Pacific Oceania) (Indonesia)	Nicole Angat / Davilyn Godinet; Yayuk Basuki / Wukirasih Sawondari	2; 6	2; 6

== South Korea vs. New Zealand ==
South Korea
2
Kaohsiung, Taiwan
9 April 2001
Rebound Ace (outdoors)

New Zealand
1

			1	2	3
1	(South Korea) (New Zealand)	Chung Yang-jin; Leanne Baker	6; 3	6; 0
2	(South Korea) (New Zealand)	Chae Kyung-yee; Shelley Stephens	6; 1	6; 4
3	(South Korea) (New Zealand)	Choi Jin-young / Chung Yang-jin; Leanne Baker / Ilke Gers	2; 6	7^{7} 6^{3}	3; 6

== Indonesia vs. New Zealand ==
Indonesia
3
Kaohsiung, Taiwan
10 April 2001
Rebound Ace (outdoors)

New Zealand
0

			1	2	3
1	(Indonesia) (New Zealand)	Romana Tedjakusuma; Leanne Baker	6; 1	6; 1
2	(Indonesia) (New Zealand)	Wynne Prakusya; Shelley Stephens	6; 0	6; 3
3	(Indonesia) (New Zealand)	Yayuk Basuki / Wynne Prakusya; Leanne Baker / Shelley Stephens	6; 0	6; 2

== Pacific Oceania vs. India ==
Pacific Oceania
0
Kaohsiung, Taiwan
10 April 2001
Rebound Ace (outdoors)

India
3

			1	2	3
1	(Pacific Oceania) (India)	Nicole Angat; Manisha Malhotra	1; 6	1; 6
2	(Pacific Oceania) (India)	Davilyn Godinet; Nirupama Vaidyanathan	2; 6	1; 6
3	(Pacific Oceania) (India)	Nicole Angat / Davilyn Godinet; Rushmi Chakravarthi / Sai Jayalakshmy Jayaram	1; 6	1; 6

== Indonesia vs. South Korea ==
Indonesia
2
Kaohsiung, Taiwan
11 April 2001
Rebound Ace (outdoors)

South Korea
1

			1	2	3
1	(Indonesia) (South Korea)	Romana Tedjakusuma; Chung Yang-jin	4; 6	3; 6
2	(Indonesia) (South Korea)	Wynne Prakusya; Chae Kyung-yee	7^{7} 6^{5}	6; 2
3	(Indonesia) (South Korea)	Yayuk Basuki / Wynne Prakusya; Chae Kyung-yee / Chung Yang-jin	6; 1	7^{8} 6^{6}

== India vs. New Zealand ==
India
1
Kaohsiung, Taiwan
11 April 2001
Rebound Ace (outdoors)

New Zealand
2

			1	2	3
1	(India) (New Zealand)	Manisha Malhotra; Tracey O'Connor	1; 6	6; 3	3; 6
2	(India) (New Zealand)	Nirupama Vaidyanathan; Shelley Stephens	6; 3	6; 4
3	(India) (New Zealand)	Rushmi Chakravarthi / Nirupama Vaidyanathan; Leanne Baker / Ilke Gers	6^{2} 7^{7}	6^{8} 7^{10}

== Indonesia vs. India ==
Indonesia
3
Kaohsiung, Taiwan
12 April 2001
Rebound Ace (outdoors)

India
0

			1	2	3
1	(Indonesia) (India)	Romana Tedjakusuma; Manisha Malhotra	6; 4	6; 2
2	(Indonesia) (India)	Wynne Prakusya; Nirupama Vaidyanathan	7^{10} 6^{8}	6^{7} 7^{9}	6; 4
3	(Indonesia) (India)	Yayuk Basuki / Romana Tedjakusuma; Rushmi Chakravarthi / Sai Jayalakshmy Jayaram	7; 5	6; 1

== Pacific Oceania vs. South Korea ==
Pacific Oceania
0
Kaohsiung, Taiwan
12 April 2001
Rebound Ace (outdoors)

South Korea
3

			1	2	3
1	(Pacific Oceania) (South Korea)	Nicole Angat; Choi Jin-young	1; 6	1; 6
2	(Pacific Oceania) (South Korea)	Davilyn Godinet; Chae Kyung-yee	3; 6	1; 6
3	(Pacific Oceania) (South Korea)	Nicole Angat / Irene Mani; Chae Kyung-yee / Chung Yang-jin	0; 6	0; 6

== South Korea vs. India ==
South Korea
1
Kaohsiung, Taiwan
13 April 2001
Rebound Ace (outdoors)

India
2

			1	2	3
1	(South Korea) (India)	Chung Yang-jin; Manisha Malhotra	6; 2	4; 6	6; 2
2	(South Korea) (India)	Chae Kyung-yee; Nirupama Vaidyanathan	4; 6	6^{3} 7^{7}
3	(South Korea) (India)	Chae Kyung-yee / Chung Yang-jin; Manisha Malhotra / Nirupama Vaidyanathan	4; 6	2; 6

== Pacific Oceania vs. New Zealand ==
Pacific Oceania
0
Kaohsiung, Taiwan
13 April 2001
Rebound Ace (outdoors)

New Zealand
3

			1	2	3
1	(Pacific Oceania) (New Zealand)	Nicole Angat; Tracey O'Connor	3; 6	0; 6
2	(Pacific Oceania) (New Zealand)	Davilyn Godinet; Shelley Stephens	4; 6	1; 6
3	(Pacific Oceania) (New Zealand)	Davilyn Godinet / Irene Mani; Leanne Baker / Ilke Gers	0; 6	1; 6

- Pacific Oceania failed to win any ties in the pool, and thus were relegated to Group II in 2002, where they finished third.

== See also ==
- Fed Cup structure
