= 1999 Fed Cup Asia/Oceania Zone Group I – Pool B =

Group B of the 1999 Fed Cup Asia/Oceania Zone Group I was one of two pools in the Asia/Oceania Zone Group I of the 1999 Fed Cup. Five teams competed in a round robin competition, with the top team advancing to the Group I play-off, the winner of which would advance to World Group II Play-offs, and the bottom team being relegated down to 2000 Group II.

	(South Korea) KOR	(New Zealand) NZL	(China) CHN	(Hong Kong) HKG	(Pacific Oceania) POC	RR; W–L	Set; W–L	Game; W–L	Standings
South Korea		2–1	2–1	3–0	3–0	4–0	22–6	151–83	1
New Zealand	1–2		2–1	2–1	3–0	3–1	17–9	129–88	2
China	1–2	1–2		3–0	3–0	2–2	18–10	137–107	3
Hong Kong	0–3	1–2	0–3		3–0	1–3	8–17	89–127	4
Pacific Oceania	0–3	0–3	0–3	0–3		0–4	1–24	51–152	5

== South Korea vs. New Zealand ==
South Korea
2
Thana City Golf Club, Samutpakarn, Thailand
22 February 1999
Hard (outdoors)

New Zealand
1

			1	2	3
1	(South Korea) (New Zealand)	Cho Yoon-jeong; Shelley Stephens	6; 0	6; 4
2	(South Korea) (New Zealand)	Park Sung-hee; Leanne Baker	6; 4	3; 6	4; 6
3	(South Korea) (New Zealand)	Choi Young-ja / Park Sung-hee; Leanne Baker / Rewa Hudson	6; 3	6; 4

== China vs. Hong Kong ==
China
3
Thana City Golf Club, Samutpakarn, Thailand
22 February 1999
Hard (outdoors)

Hong Kong
0

			1	2	3
1	(China) (Hong Kong)	Li Ting; Chan Lee	6; 2	6; 4
2	(China) (Hong Kong)	Ding Ding; Tong Ka-po	7^{7} 6^{0}	6; 4
3	(China) (Hong Kong)	Li Na / Li Ting; Anne Aallonen / Chan Lee	6; 1	6; 3

== South Korea vs. China ==
South Korea
2
Thana City Golf Club, Samutpakarn, Thailand
23 February 1999
Hard (outdoors)

China
1

			1	2	3
1	(South Korea) (China)	Choi Young-ja; Li Na	6; 2	3; 6	6; 2
2	(South Korea) (China)	Park Sung-hee; Ding Ding	1; 6	6; 1	6; 8
3	(South Korea) (China)	Cho Yoon-jeong / Chung Yang-jin; Ding Ding / Li Ting	6; 2	0; 6	7; 5

== Pacific Oceania vs. Hong Kong ==
Pacific Oceania
0
Thana City Golf Club, Samutpakarn, Thailand
23 February 1999
Hard (outdoors)

Hong Kong
3

			1	2	3
1	(Pacific Oceania) (Hong Kong)	Paiao-Asinata Short; Chan Lee	7^{7} 6^{4}	1; 6	3; 6
2	(Pacific Oceania) (Hong Kong)	Tagifano So'Onalole; Tong Ka-po	2; 6	3; 6
3	(Pacific Oceania) (Hong Kong)	Davilyn Godinet / Simone Wichman; Anne Aallonen / Lam Po Kuen	3; 6	4; 6

== South Korea vs. Hong Kong ==
South Korea
2
Thana City Golf Club, Samutpakarn, Thailand
24 February 1999
Hard (outdoors)

Hong Kong
1

			1	2	3
1	(South Korea) (Hong Kong)	Chung Yang-jin; Chan Lee	6; 2	6; 0
2	(South Korea) (Hong Kong)	Cho Yoon-jeong; Tong Ka-po	6; 2	6; 1
3	(South Korea) (Hong Kong)	Choi Young-ja / Park Sung-hee; Anne Aallonen / Tong Ka-po	6; 1	6; 1

== Pacific Oceania vs. New Zealand ==
Pacific Oceania
0
Thana City Golf Club, Samutpakarn, Thailand
24 February 1999
Hard (outdoors)

New Zealand
3

			1	2	3
1	(Pacific Oceania) (New Zealand)	Paiao-Asinata Short; Rewa Hudson	1; 6	2; 6
2	(Pacific Oceania) (New Zealand)	Tagifano So'Onalole; Leanne Baker	2; 6	0; 6
3	(Pacific Oceania) (New Zealand)	Davilyn Godinet / Simone Wichman; Rewa Hudson / Niki Tippins	1; 6	0; 6

== Pacific Oceania vs. South Korea ==
Pacific Oceania
0
Thana City Golf Club, Samutpakarn, Thailand
25 February 1999
Hard (outdoors)

South Korea
3

			1	2	3
1	(Pacific Oceania) (South Korea)	Paiao-Asinata Short; Chung Yang-jin	0; 6	2; 6
2	(Pacific Oceania) (South Korea)	Tagifano So'Onalole; Park Sung-hee	2; 6	6^{2} 7^{7}
3	(Pacific Oceania) (South Korea)	Davilyn Godinet / Paiao-Asinata Short; Cho Yoon-jeong / Choi Young-ja	1; 6	0; 6

== New Zealand vs. China ==
New Zealand
2
Thana City Golf Club, Samutpakarn, Thailand
25 February 1999
Hard (outdoors)

China
1

			1	2	3
1	(New Zealand) (China)	Rewa Hudson; Lin Ya-Ming	6; 0	2; 6	3; 6
2	(New Zealand) (China)	Leanne Baker; Ding Ding	6; 3	6; 3
3	(New Zealand) (China)	Leanne Baker / Shelley Stephens; Li Na / Li Ting	6; 3	6; 4

== New Zealand vs. Hong Kong ==
New Zealand
2
Thana City Golf Club, Samutpakarn, Thailand
26 February 1999
Hard (outdoors)

Hong Kong
1

			1	2	3
1	(New Zealand) (Hong Kong)	Niki Tippins; Chan Lee	6; 1	6; 3
2	(New Zealand) (Hong Kong)	Leanne Baker; Tong Ka-po	4; 6	3; 6
3	(New Zealand) (Hong Kong)	Leanne Baker / Shelley Stephens; Anne Aallonen / Tong Ka-po	6; 1	6; 3

== Pacific Oceania vs. China ==
Pacific Oceania
0
Thana City Golf Club, Samutpakarn, Thailand
26 February 1999
Hard (outdoors)

China
3

			1	2	3
1	(Pacific Oceania) (China)	Davilyn Godinet; Li Na	5; 7	3; 6
2	(Pacific Oceania) (China)	Paiao-Asinata Short; Li Ting	1; 6	0; 6
3	(Pacific Oceania) (China)	Tagifano So'Onalole / Paiao-Asinata Short; Li Na / Li Ting	0; 6	2; 6

- Pacific Oceania placed last in the pool, and thus was relegated to Group II in 2000, where they achieved advancement back into Group I for 2001.

== See also ==
- Fed Cup structure
