= 2000 Fed Cup Asia/Oceania Zone =

Subsection of tennis competition

The Asia/Oceania Zone was one of three zones of regional competition in the 2000 Fed Cup.

== Group I ==
- Venue: Utsubo Tennis Center, Osaka, Japan (outdoor hard)
- Date: 25–30 April

The eleven teams were divided into one pool of six and one pool five teams. The teams that finished first in the pools played-off to determine which team would partake in the World Group play-offs next year. The two nations coming last in the pools were relegated to Group II for 2001.

=== Pools ===
| | Pool A | JPN | IND | THA | KAZ | HKG |
| 1 | Japan (3–1) | | 2–0 | 1–2 | 3–0 | 3–0 |
| 2 | India (3–1) | 0–2 | | 2–1 | 3–0 | 3–0 |
| 3 | Thailand (3–1) | 2–1 | 1–2 | | 2–0 | 2–1 |
| 4 | Kazakhstan (1–3) | 0–3 | 0–3 | 0–2 | | 2–1 |
| 5 | Hong Kong (0–4) | 0–3 | 0–3 | 1–2 | 1–2 | |

| | Pool B | CHN | INA | TPE | KOR | NZL | SIN |
| 1 | China (5–0) | | 2–0 | 3–0 | 2–1 | 3–0 | 2–0 |
| 2 | Indonesia (4–1) | 0–2 | | 2–1 | 2–0 | 3–0 | 3–0 |
| 3 | Chinese Taipei (3–2) | 0–3 | 1–2 | | 2–1 | 2–1 | 3–0 |
| 4 | South Korea (2–3) | 1–2 | 0–2 | 1–2 | | 3–0 | 3–0 |
| 5 | New Zealand (1–4) | 0–3 | 0–3 | 1–2 | 0–3 | | 3–0 |
| 6 | Singapore (0–5) | 0–2 | 0–3 | 0–3 | 0–3 | 0–3 | |

=== Play-off ===
Japan
2
Utsubo Tennis Center, Osaka, Japan
30 April 2000
Decoturf (outdoors)

China
1

| | | | 1 | 2 | 3 |
|---|---|---|---|---|---|
| 1 | (Japan) (China) | Shinobu Asagoe; Li Na | 6^{6} 7^{8} | 2; 6 |
| 2 | (Japan) (China) | Ai Sugiyama; Yi Jing-Qian | 6; 4 | 6; 2 |
| 3 | (Japan) (China) | Nana Miyagi / Ai Sugiyama; Li Fang / Li Na | 1; 6 | 6; 4 | 6; 1 |

- Japan advanced to 2001 World Group play-offs.
- Hong Kong and Singapore relegated to Group II in 2001.

== Group II ==
- Venue: Utsubo Tennis Center, Osaka, Japan (outdoor hard)
- Date: 25–30 April

The eleven teams were divided into two pools of six and five teams. The top two teams from each pool then moved on to the play-off stage of the competition. The two teams that won a match from the play-off stage would advance to Group I for 2001.

=== Pools ===
| | Pool A | UZB | POC | MAS | FIJ | IRQ |
| 1 | Uzbekistan (4–0) | | 2–1 | 3–0 | 3–0 | 3–0 |
| 2 | Pacific Oceania (3–1) | 1–2 | | 3–0 | 2–0 | 3–0 |
| 3 | Malaysia (2–2) | 0–3 | 0–3 | | 3–0 | 2–0 |
| 4 | Fiji (1–3) | 0–3 | 0–2 | 0–3 | | 3–0 |
| 5 | Iraq (0–4) | 0–3 | 0–3 | 0–2 | 0–3 | |

| | Pool B | PHI | TJK | SRI | JOR | PAK | SYR |
| 1 | Philippines (5–0) | | 3–0 | 3–0 | 3–0 | 2–0 | 3–0 |
| 2 | Tajikistan (4–1) | 0–3 | | 2–1 | 2–1 | 3–0 | 3–0 |
| 3 | Sri Lanka (2–3) | 0–3 | 1–2 | | 1–2 | 2–1 | 2–0 |
| 4 | Jordan (2–3) | 0–3 | 1–2 | 2–1 | | 1–2 | 2–1 |
| 5 | Pakistan (2–3) | 0–2 | 0–3 | 1–2 | 2–1 | | 2–1 |
| 6 | Syria (0–5) | 0–3 | 0–3 | 0–2 | 1–2 | 1–2 | |

=== Play-offs ===
| Winning team | Score | Losing team |
|---|---|---|
| Uzbekistan | 2–0 | Tajikistan |
| Pacific Oceania | 2–0 | Philippines |

- Uzbekistan and Pacific Oceania advanced to Group I in 2001.

== See also ==
- Fed Cup structure
