= Ilke Gers =

New Zealand artist and former tennis player (born 1981)

- Country (sports): New Zealand
- Born: 26 October 1981 (age 43); New Zealand
- Turned pro: 2000
- Retired: 2004
- Plays: Right-handed (two-handed backhand)
- Prize money: $30,137
- Official website: http://www.ilkegers.info/

Singles
- Career record: 93–101
- Career titles: 0
- Highest ranking: No. 382 (13 May 2002)

Doubles
- Career record: 60–64
- Career titles: 2 ITF
- Highest ranking: No. 167 (2 February 2004)

Team competitions
- Fed Cup: 4–5

Ilke Gers (born 26 October 1981) is a visual artist and a former professional tennis player from New Zealand.

== Art career ==
Ilke Gers works with installation, performance and publications that bring movement, behaviour, social and spatial conditions into play. She studied at the Werkplaats Typografie, and was a resident at the Jan van Eyck Academie from 2014-2015. Her work has been presented at LLS Paleis, Antwerp; the Biënnale Van België, Ghent; Kunsthal Rotterdam; De Appel, Amsterdam; 019, Ghent; De Fabriek, Eindhoven; Beursschouwburg, Brussels; D21 – Kunstraum, Leipzig. She is part of Action Publishing Collective, based in Rotterdam.

== Tennis career ==
Gers won two doubles titles on the ITF Women's Circuit in her career. On 13 May 2002, she reached her best singles ranking of world No. 382. On 2 February 2004, she peaked at No. 167 in the doubles rankings.

Gers retired from tennis 2004.

Playing for New Zealand Fed Cup team, she has a win–loss record of 4–5.

== ITF finals ==
=== Singles (0–1) ===
Legend $25,000 tournaments $10,000 tournaments	Finals by surface Hard (0–1) Grass (0–0)

Result	No.	Date	Tier	Tournament	Surface	Opponent	Score
Runner-up	1.	29 January 2002	10,000	Wellington, New Zealand	Hard	(Australia) Adriana Szili	2–6, 2–6

=== Doubles (2–7) ===
Legend $25,000 tournaments $10,000 tournaments	Finals by surface Hard (1–5) Grass (1–2)

Result	No.	Date	Tier	Tournament	Surface	Partner	Opponents	Score
Runner-up	1.	1 July 2001	10,000	Edmond, United States	Hard	(New Zealand) Tracey O'Connor	(United States) Michelle Dasso (United States) Julie Ditty	4–6, 5–7
Runner-up	2.	28 January 2003	10,000	Wellington, New Zealand	Hard	(Chinese Taipei) Chuang Chia-jung	(Australia) Lauren Breadmore (Australia) Kristen van Elden	4–6, 1–6
Runner-up	3.	3 March 2003	10,000	Warrnambool, Australia	Grass	(Chinese Taipei) Chuang Chia-jung	(Australia) Monique Adamczak (Germany) Madita Suer	4–6, 4–6
Winner	1.	17 March 2003	10,000	Yarrawonga, Australia	Grass	(Chinese Taipei) Chuang Chia-jung	(United Kingdom) Sarah Borwell (Australia) Bree Calderwood	6–1, 7–5
Runner-up	4.	24 March 2003	10,000	Albury, Australia	Grass	(Chinese Taipei) Chuang Chia-jung	(Australia) Nicole Sewell (Netherlands) Andrea van den Hurk	6–2, 1–6, 4–6
Winner	2.	10 June 2003	25,000	Allentown, United States	Hard	(South Africa) Surina De Beer	(United States) Adria Engel (United States) Kelly McCain	6–7^{(4)}, 6–3, 6–3
Runner-up	5.	17 June 2003	10,000	Dallas, United States	Hard	(South Africa) Surina De Beer	(United States) Stephanie Hazlett (United States) Julia Scaringe	2–6, 1–6
Runner-up	6.	20 October 2003	25,000	Cardiff, Great Britain	Hard	(South Africa) Surina De Beer	(Republic of Ireland) Claire Curran (Turkey) İpek Şenoğlu	4–6, 6–2, 3–6
Runner-up	7.	16 November 2003	25,000	Port Pirie, Australia	Hard	(Thailand) Napaporn Tongsalee	(Australia) Trudi Musgrave (United States) Abigail Spears	2–6, 2–6

== Fed Cup participation ==
=== Singles (1–4) ===
Edition	Stage	Date	Location	Against	Surface	Opponent	W/L	Score
2002 Fed Cup; Asia/Oceania; Zone Group I	R/R	4 March 2002	Guangzhou, China	(South Korea) South Korea	Hard	(South Korea) Cho Yoon-jeong	L	4–6, 2–6
2002 Fed Cup; Asia/Oceania; Zone Group I	R/R	5 March 2002	Guangzhou, China	Chinese Taipei	Hard	(Chinese Taipei) Janet Lee	L	4–6, 2–6
2002 Fed Cup; Asia/Oceania; Zone Group I	R/R	6 March 2002	Guangzhou, China	India	Hard	(India) Rushmi Chakravarthi	W	6–1, 6–0
2002 Fed Cup; Asia/Oceania; Zone Group I	R/R	7 March 2002	Guangzhou, China	Indonesia	Hard	(Indonesia) Angelique Widjaja	L	4–6, 1–6
2003 Fed Cup; Asia/Oceania; Zone Group I	R/R	24 April 2003	Tokyo, Japan	China	Hard	(China) Sun Tiantian	L	1–6, 2–6

=== Doubles (3–1) ===
Edition	Stage	Date	Location	Against	Surface	Partner	Opponents	W/L	Score
2001 Fed Cup; Asia/Oceania; Zone Group I	R/R	9 April 2001	Kaohsiung, Taiwan	South Korea	Hard	(New Zealand) Leanne Baker	Choi Jin-young; Chung Yang-jin	W	6–2, 6–7^{(3–7)}, 6–3
2001 Fed Cup; Asia/Oceania; Zone Group I	R/R	11 April 2001	Kaohsiung, Taiwan	India	Hard	(New Zealand) Leanne Baker	Rushmi Chakravarthi; Nirupama Sanjeev	W	7–6^{(7–2)}, 7–6^{(10–8)}
2001 Fed Cup; Asia/Oceania; Zone Group I	R/R	13 April 2001	Kaohsiung, Taiwan	Pacific Oceania	Hard	(New Zealand) Leanne Baker	Davilyn Godinet; Irene Mani	W	6–0, 6–1
2003 Fed Cup; Asia/Oceania; Zone Group I	R/R	22 April 2003	Tokyo, Japan	Japan	Hard	(New Zealand) Shelley Stephens	Saori Obata; Ai Sugiyama	L	0–6, 1–6

== ITF Junior finals ==
=== Doubles (1–0) ===
Legend
Category G1
Category G2
Category G3
Category G4
Category G5

Outcome	No.	Date	Tournament	Location	Surface	Partner	Opponents	Score
Winner	1.	18 July 1999	Jetsave New Zealand 18 & Under Indoor Championships	Auckland, New Zealand	Hard (i)	(New Zealand) Tracey O'Connor	(New Zealand) Eden Marama (New Zealand) Paula Marama	6–4, 7–5
