= 2003 Fed Cup Asia/Oceania Zone Group I – Pool A =

Group A of the 2003 Fed Cup Asia/Oceania Zone Group I

Group A of the 2003 Fed Cup Asia/Oceania Zone Group I was one of two pools in the Asia/Oceania Zone Group I of the 2003 Fed Cup. Five teams competed in a round robin competition, with the top two teams advancing to the play-offs and the bottom team being relegated to Group II for next year.

		(China) CHN	(Japan) JPN	(South Korea) KOR	(New Zealand) NZL	(Hong Kong) HKG	RR; W–L	Set; W–L	Game; W–L	Standings
20	China		0–2	2–0	3–0	3–0	3–1	16–4	111–55	2
24	Japan	2–0		2–1	3–0	2–0	4–0	19–2	126–45	1
25	South Korea	0–2	1–2		2–0	3–0	2–2	12–10	96–93	3
45	New Zealand	0–3	0–3	0–2		3–0	1–3	6–14	70–111	4
53	Hong Kong	0–3	0–2	0–3	0–3		0–4	2–22	59–145	5

== Japan vs. South Korea ==
Japan
2
Tokyo, Japan
21 April 2003
Hard (outdoors)

South Korea
0

			1	2	3
1	(Japan) (South Korea)	Shinobu Asagoe; Hong Da-jung	6^{4} 7^{7}	6; 1	4; 6
2	(Japan) (South Korea)	Ai Sugiyama; Choi Young-ja	6; 0	6; 2
3	(Japan) (South Korea)	Rika Fujiwara / Ai Sugiyama; Choi Young-ja / Hong Da-jung	6; 4	6; 2

== New Zealand vs. Hong Kong ==
New Zealand
3
Tokyo, Japan
21 April 2003
Hard (outdoors)

Hong Kong
0

			1	2	3
1	(New Zealand) (Hong Kong)	Leanne Baker; Kristin Godridge	7^{7} 6^{4}	4; 6	6; 3
2	(New Zealand) (Hong Kong)	Shelley Stephens; Lam Po Kuen	7^{8} 6^{6}	7^{7} 6^{2}
3	(New Zealand) (Hong Kong)	Leanne Baker / Eden Marama; Lam Po Kuen / Kristin Godridge	6^{7} 7^{9}	6; 3	6; 2

== China vs. Hong Kong ==
China
3
Tokyo, Japan
22 April 2003
Hard (outdoors)

Hong Kong
0

			1	2	3
1	(China) (Hong Kong)	Sun Tiantian; Kristin Godridge	6; 0	6; 1
2	(China) (Hong Kong)	Zheng Jie; Lee Si-Nga	6; 0	6; 1
3	(China) (Hong Kong)	Yan Zi / Zheng Jie; Lam Po Kuen / Lee Si-Nga	6; 2	6; 0

== Japan vs. New Zealand ==
Japan
0
Tokyo, Japan
22 April 2003
Hard (outdoors)

New Zealand
2

			1	2	3
1	(Japan) (New Zealand)	Saori Obata; Eden Marama	6; 1	6; 4
2	(Japan) (New Zealand)	Shinobu Asagoe; Leanne Baker	6; 0	6; 0
3	(Japan) (New Zealand)	Saori Obata / Ai Sugiyama; Ilke Gers / Shelley Stephens	6; 0	6; 1

== China vs. Japan ==
China
0
Tokyo, Japan
23 April 2003
Hard (outdoors)

Japan
2

			1	2	3
1	(China) (Japan)	Sun Tiantian; Shinobu Asagoe	6^{5} 7^{7}	3; 6
2	(China) (Japan)	Zheng Jie; Ai Sugiyama	5; 6	1; 6
3	(China) (Japan)	Li Ting / Sun Tiantian; Rika Fujiwara / Saori Obata				not played

== South Korea vs. New Zealand ==
South Korea
2
Tokyo, Japan
24 April 2003
Hard (outdoors)

New Zealand
0

			1	2	3
1	(South Korea) (New Zealand)	Choi Jin-young; Eden Marama	6; 3	6; 2
2	(South Korea) (New Zealand)	Hong Da-jung; Shelley Stephens	4; 6	6; 1	6; 2
3	(South Korea) (New Zealand)	Choi Young-ja / Kim Mi-ok; Leanne Baker / Eden Marama				not played

== China vs. New Zealand ==
China
3
Tokyo, Japan
24 April 2003
Hard (outdoors)

New Zealand
0

			1	2	3
1	(China) (New Zealand)	Sun Tiantian; Ilke Gers	6; 1	6; 2
2	(China) (New Zealand)	Zheng Jie; Shelley Stephens	6; 3	6; 4
3	(China) (New Zealand)	Li Ting / Sun Tiantian; Leanne Baker / Eden Marama	6; 1	6; 4

== South Korea vs. Hong Kong ==
South Korea
3
Tokyo, Japan
24 April 2003
Hard (outdoors)

Hong Kong
0

			1	2	3
1	(South Korea) (Hong Kong)	Kim Mi-ok; Kristin Godridge	6; 3	6; 1
2	(South Korea) (Hong Kong)	Hong Da-jung; Lam Po Kuen	6; 3	6; 3
3	(South Korea) (Hong Kong)	Choi Jin-young / Kim Mi-ok; Lam Po Kuen / Kristin Godridge	6; 1	6; 4

== China vs. South Korea ==
China
2
Tokyo, Japan
25 April 2003
Hard (outdoors)

South Korea
0

			1	2	3
1	(China) (South Korea)	Sun Tiantian; Kim Mi-ok	6; 3	6; 3
2	(China) (South Korea)	Zheng Jie; Choi Jin-young	6; 1	6; 3
3	(China) (South Korea)	Li Ting / Sun Tiantian; Choi Young-ja / Kim Mi-ok				not played

== Japan vs. Hong Kong ==
Japan
2
Tokyo, Japan
25 April 2003
Hard (outdoors)

Hong Kong
0

			1	2	3
1	(Japan) (Hong Kong)	Saori Obata; Lee Si-Nga	6; 0	6; 0
2	(Japan) (Hong Kong)	Shinobu Asagoe; Lam Po Kuen	6; 1	6; 1
3	(Japan) (Hong Kong)	Rika Fujiwara / Saori Obata; Lam Po Kuen / Kristin Godridge				not played

- Hong Kong failed to win any ties in the pool, and thus was relegated to Group II in 2004. However, they did not compete next year.

== See also ==
- Fed Cup structure
