= Niki Tippins =

New Zealand tennis player

- Country (sports): New Zealand
- Born: 15 May 1976 (age 48); New Zealand
- Turned pro: 1997
- Retired: 2005
- Plays: Left-handed (two-handed backhand)
- Prize money: $10,376

Singles
- Career record: 32–50
- Highest ranking: No. 457 (15 May 2000)

Doubles
- Career record: 26–45
- Highest ranking: No. 413 (23 August 1999)

Team competitions
- Fed Cup: 5–2
- Last updated on: 3 April 2017.

Niki Tippins (born 15 May 1976) is a retired New Zealand female tennis player.

On 15 May 2000, Tippins reached her best singles ranking of world number 457. On 23 August 1999, she peaked at world number 413 in the doubles rankings. Tippins retired from tennis 2005.

Playing for New Zealand Fed Cup team at the Fed Cup, Tippins has a win–loss record of 5–2.

== Fed Cup participation ==
=== Singles ===
Edition	Stage	Date	Location	Against	Surface	Opponent	W/L	Score
1999 Fed Cup; Asia/Oceania Zone Group I	R/R	26 February 1999	Samut Prakan, Thailand	Hong Kong	Hard	(Hong Kong) Chan Lee	W	6–1, 6–3
2000 Fed Cup; Asia/Oceania Zone Group I	R/R	26 April 2000	Osaka, Japan	(Chinese Taipei) Chinese Taipei	Hard	(Chinese Taipei) Tai Lan-lan	W	6–3, 3–6, 6–4
2000 Fed Cup; Asia/Oceania Zone Group I	R/R	27 April 2000	Osaka, Japan	Singapore	Hard	(Singapore) Simin Liu	W	6–0, 6–0
2000 Fed Cup; Asia/Oceania Zone Group I	R/R	27 April 2000	Osaka, Japan	China	Hard	(China) Li Na	L	2–6, 0–6
2000 Fed Cup; Asia/Oceania Zone Group I	R/R	29 April 2000	Osaka, Japan	South Korea	Hard	(South Korea) Chae Kyung-yee	L	0–6, 2–6

=== Doubles ===
Edition	Stage	Date	Location	Against	Surface	Partner	Opponents	W/L	Score
1998 Fed Cup; Asia/Oceania Zone Group I	R/R	18 February 1998	Samut Prakan, Thailand	Philippines	Hard	(New Zealand) Shelley Stephens	Pamela Floro; Jennifer Saret	W	6–1, 6–2
1999 Fed Cup; Asia/Oceania Zone Group I	R/R	24 February 1999	Samut Prakan, Thailand	Pacific Oceania	Hard	(New Zealand) Rewa Hudson	Davilyn Godinet; Simone Wichman	W	6–1, 6–0
