= 2000 Fed Cup Asia/Oceania Zone Group II – Pool B =

International tennis competition

Group B of the 2000 Fed Cup Asia/Oceania Zone Group II was one of two pools in the Asia/Oceania Zone Group II of the 2000 Fed Cup. Five teams competed in a round robin competition, with the top two teams advancing to the play-off.

	(Philippines) PHI	(Tajikistan) TJK	(Sri Lanka) SRI	(Jordan) JOR	(Pakistan) PAK	(Syria) SYR	Match; W–L	Set; W–L	Game; W–L	Standings
Philippines		3–0	3–0	3–0	2–0	3–0	5–0	28–1	173–65	1
Tajikistan	0–3		2–1	2–1	3–0	3–0	4–1	20–12	151–137	2
Sri Lanka	0–3	1–2		1–2	2–1	2–0	2–3	15–17	133–138	3
Jordan	0–3	1–2	2–1		1–2	2–1	2–3	13–19	114–138	4
Pakistan	0–2	0–3	1–2	2–1		2–1	2–3	12–19	121–138	5
Syria	0–3	0–3	0–2	1–2	1–2		0–5	5–25	94–171	6

== Philippines vs. Jordan ==
Philippines
3
Utsubo Tennis Center, Osaka, Japan
25 April 2000
Decoturf (outdoors)

Jordan
0

			1	2	3
1	(Philippines) (Jordan)	Czarina-Mae Arévalo; Dina Dajani	6; 3	7; 5
2	(Philippines) (Jordan)	Maricris Gentz; Dina Naffa	6; 3	6; 2
3	(Philippines) (Jordan)	Vida Lina Alpuerto / Czarina-Mae Arévalo; Dina Dajani / Dina Naffa	6; 0	6; 3

== Tajikistan vs. Syria ==
Tajikistan
3
Utsubo Tennis Center, Osaka, Japan
25 April 2000
Decoturf (outdoors)

Syria
0

			1	2	3
1	(Tajikistan) (Syria)	Zihaida Shantalova; Shaza Tinawi	6; 2	7; 5
2	(Tajikistan) (Syria)	Shahlio Ibadullaeva; Farah Dayoub	6; 2	7^{9} 6^{7}
3	(Tajikistan) (Syria)	Roxana Abdurakhmonova / Zihaida Shantalova; Farah Dayoub / Hazar Sidki	6; 1	6; 1

== Sri Lanka vs. Pakistan ==
Sri Lanka
2
Utsubo Tennis Center, Osaka, Japan
25 April 2000
Decoturf (outdoors)

Pakistan
1

			1	2	3
1	(Sri Lanka) (Pakistan)	Vajira Premaratne; Haleema Rahim	6; 2	6; 3
2	(Sri Lanka) (Pakistan)	Sobhini De Silva; Nida Waseem	0; 6	2; 6
3	(Sri Lanka) (Pakistan)	Vajira Premaratne / Sobhini De Silva; Mehvish Chishtie / Nida Waseem	6; 1	4; 6	6; 2

== Philippines vs. Pakistan ==
Philippines
2
Utsubo Tennis Center, Osaka, Japan
26 April 2000
Decoturf (outdoors)

Pakistan
0

			1	2	3
1	(Philippines) (Pakistan)	Czarina-Mae Arévalo; Haleema Rahim	6; 0	6; 2
2	(Philippines) (Pakistan)	Maricris Gentz; Nida Waseem	6; 1	7^{11} 6^{9}
3	(Philippines) (Pakistan)	Czarina-Mae Arévalo / Maricris Gentz; Nosheen Ehtesham / Nida Waseem				not played

== Tajikistan vs. Jordan ==
Tajikistan
2
Utsubo Tennis Center, Osaka, Japan
26 April 2000
Decoturf (outdoors)

Jordan
1

			1	2	3
1	(Tajikistan) (Jordan)	Roxana Abdurakhmonova; Dina Dajani	0; 6	1; 6
2	(Tajikistan) (Jordan)	Shahlio Ibadullaeva; Dina Naffa	6; 2	6; 1
3	(Tajikistan) (Jordan)	Shahlio Ibadullaeva / Zihaida Shantalova; Dina Dajani / Dina Naffa	6; 4	6; 4

== Sri Lanka vs. Syria ==
Sri Lanka
2
Utsubo Tennis Center, Osaka, Japan
26 April 2000
Decoturf (outdoors)

Syria
0

			1	2	3
1	(Sri Lanka) (Syria)	Vajira Premaratne; Shaza Tinawi	6; 1	6; 0
2	(Sri Lanka) (Syria)	Sobhini De Silva; Farah Dayoub	6; 3	6; 1
3	(Sri Lanka) (Syria)	Manisha Abeywardene / Vajira Premaratne; Farah Dayoub / Nivin Kezbari				not played

== Philippines vs. Tajikistan ==
Philippines
3
Utsubo Tennis Center, Osaka, Japan
27 April 2000
Decoturf (outdoors)

Tajikistan
0

			1	2	3
1	(Philippines) (Tajikistan)	Czarina-Mae Arévalo; Zihaida Shantalova	6; 4	6; 3
2	(Philippines) (Tajikistan)	Maricris Gentz; Shahlio Ibadullaeva	6; 0	6; 1
3	(Philippines) (Tajikistan)	Vida Lina Alpuerto / Czarina-Mae Arévalo; Roxana Abdurakhmonova / Zihaida Shantalova	6; 4	6; 1

== Sri Lanka vs. Jordan ==
Sri Lanka
1
Utsubo Tennis Center, Osaka, Japan
27 April 2000
Decoturf (outdoors)

Jordan
2

			1	2	3
1	(Sri Lanka) (Jordan)	Vajira Premaratne; Dina Dajani	0; 6	3; 6
2	(Sri Lanka) (Jordan)	Sobhini De Silva; Dina Naffa	6; 1	6; 1
3	(Sri Lanka) (Jordan)	Sobhini De Silva / Vajira Premaratne; Dina Dajani / Dina Naffa	6; 4	4; 6	3; 6

== Pakistan vs. Syria ==
Pakistan
2
Utsubo Tennis Center, Osaka, Japan
27 April 2000
Decoturf (outdoors)

Syria
1

			1	2	3
1	(Pakistan) (Syria)	Mehvish Chishtie; Shaza Tinawi	6^{5} 7^{7}	3; 6
2	(Pakistan) (Syria)	Nida Waseem; Farah Dayoub	6; 2	6; 3
3	(Pakistan) (Syria)	Nosheen Ehtesham / Nida Waseem; Farah Dayoub / Hazar Sidki	6; 3	1; 6	6; 1

== Philippines vs. Syria ==
Philippines
3
Utsubo Tennis Center, Osaka, Japan
28 April 2000
Decoturf (outdoors)

Syria
0

			1	2	3
1	(Philippines) (Syria)	Czarina-Mae Arévalo; Nivin Kezbari	6; 0	6; 3
2	(Philippines) (Syria)	Maricris Gentz; Hazar Sidki	6; 2	6; 1
3	(Philippines) (Syria)	Vida Lina Alpuerto / Czarina-Mae Arévalo; Nivin Kezbari / Hazar Sidki	6; 2	6; 3

== Tajikistan vs. Sri Lanka ==
Tajikistan
2
Utsubo Tennis Center, Osaka, Japan
28 April 2000
Decoturf (outdoors)

Sri Lanka
1

			1	2	3
1	(Tajikistan) (Sri Lanka)	Zihaida Shantalova; Vajira Premaratne	7^{7} 6^{1}	6; 1
2	(Tajikistan) (Sri Lanka)	Shahlio Ibadullaeva; Manisha Abeywardene	4; 6	4; 6
3	(Tajikistan) (Sri Lanka)	Roxana Abdurakhmonova / Zihaida Shantalova; Manisha Abeywardene / Vajira Premaratne	6; 4	3; 6	6; 4

== Jordan vs. Pakistan ==
Jordan
1
Utsubo Tennis Center, Osaka, Japan
28 April 2000
Decoturf (outdoors)

Pakistan
2

			1	2	3
1	(Jordan) (Pakistan)	Dina Dajani; Mehvish Chishti	6; 1	6; 2
2	(Jordan) (Pakistan)	Dina Naffa; Nida Waseem	0; 6	1; 6
3	(Jordan) (Pakistan)	Dina Dajani / Dina Naffa; Nosheen Ehtesham / Nida Waseem	2; 6	1; 6

== Philippines vs. Sri Lanka ==
Philippines
3
Utsubo Tennis Center, Osaka, Japan
29 April 2000
Decoturf (outdoors)

Sri Lanka
0

			1	2	3
1	(Philippines) (Sri Lanka)	Czarina-Mae Arévalo; Samanthi Wijesekera	6; 0	6; 1
2	(Philippines) (Sri Lanka)	Maricris Gentz; Manisha Abeywardene	6; 0	6; 1
3	(Philippines) (Sri Lanka)	Vida Lina Alpuerto / Czarina-Mae Arévalo; Manisha Abeywardene / Vajira Premaratne	7; 5	2; 6	6; 3

== Tajikistan vs. Pakistan ==
Tajikistan
3
Utsubo Tennis Center, Osaka, Japan
29 April 2000
Decoturf (outdoors)

Pakistan
0

			1	2	3
1	(Tajikistan) (Pakistan)	Zihaida Shantalova; Mehvish Chishtie	6; 2	6; 2
2	(Tajikistan) (Pakistan)	Shahlio Ibadullaeva; Haleema Rahim	2; 6	6; 4	6; 3
3	(Tajikistan) (Pakistan)	Roxana Abdurakhmonova / Shahlio Ibadullaeva; Nosheen Ehtesham / Haleema Rahim	7; 5	6; 3

== Jordan vs. Syria ==
Jordan
2
Utsubo Tennis Center, Osaka, Japan
29 April 2000
Decoturf (outdoors)

Syria
1

			1	2	3
1	(Jordan) (Syria)	Dina Dajani; Shaza Tinawi	6; 1	6; 0
2	(Jordan) (Syria)	Dina Naffa; Farah Dayoub	6; 4	4; 6	5; 7
3	(Jordan) (Syria)	Dina Dajani / Dina Naffa; Farah Dayoub / Hazar Sidki	6; 1	6; 2

== See also ==
- Fed Cup structure
