= 2006 Davis Cup Asia/Oceania Zone Group II =

One of three zones of regional Davis Cup 2006

The Asia/Oceania Zone was one of the three zones of the regional Davis Cup competition in 2006.

In the Asia/Oceania Zone there were four tiers, called groups, in which teams compete against each other to advance to the upper tier. Winners in Group II advanced to the Asia/Oceania Zone Group I. Teams who lost their respective ties competed in the relegation play-offs, with winning teams remaining in Group II, whereas teams who lost their play-offs were relegated to the Asia/Oceania Zone Group III in 2007.

== Participating nations ==
- Hong Kong
- Indonesia
- Kazakhstan
- Kuwait
- Lebanon
- Malaysia
- New Zealand
- Pacific Oceania

=== Draw ===
Play-offs
Jounieh, Lebanon (clay)
Lebanon	0
3	Kuwait	5
Nouméa, New Caledonia (hard)
Pacific Oceania	3
Malaysia	2

First Round
Auckland, New Zealand (indoor hard)
1	New Zealand	5
Lebanon	0
Kuwait City, Kuwait (hard)
3	Kuwait	2
Kazakhstan	3
Hong Kong, China (hard)
Pacific Oceania	1
4	Hong Kong	4
Balikpapan, Indonesia (hard)
Malaysia	0
2	Indonesia	5

Second Round
Almaty, Kazakhstan (indoor hard)
1	New Zealand	2
Kazakhstan	3
Surabaya, Indonesia (hard)
4	Hong Kong	0
2	Indonesia	5

Third Round
Almaty, Kazakhstan (indoor hard)
Kazakhstan	3
2	Indonesia	2

- Lebanon and Malaysia relegated to Group III in 2007.
- Kazakhstan promoted to Group I in 2007.

== First round ==
=== New Zealand vs. Lebanon ===
New Zealand
5
More FM Tennis Park, Auckland, New Zealand
10–12 February 2006
Hard (indoors)

Lebanon
0

			1	2	3	4	5
1	(New Zealand) (Lebanon)	Mark Nielsen; Karim Alayli	6; 2	6; 1	6; 2
2	(New Zealand) (Lebanon)	Daniel King-Turner; Patrick Chucri	6; 3	6; 2	6; 1
3	(New Zealand) (Lebanon)	Daniel King-Turner / Mark Nielsen; Karim Alayli / Patrick Chucri	6; 2	6; 3	6; 1
4	(New Zealand) (Lebanon)	Jose Statham; Wahib Maknieh	6; 4	6; 3
5	(New Zealand) (Lebanon)	Daniel King-Turner; Karim Alayli	6; 3	6; 4

=== Kuwait vs. Kazakhstan ===
Kuwait
2
Yarmouk Sports Club, Kuwait City, Kuwait
10–12 February 2006
Hard

Kazakhstan
3

			1	2	3	4	5
1	(Kuwait) (Kazakhstan)	Mohammad Ghareeb; Dmitriy Makeyev	6; 4	6; 4	7; 5
2	(Kuwait) (Kazakhstan)	Abdullah Maqdes; Alexey Kedryuk	4; 6	1; 6	5; 7
3	(Kuwait) (Kazakhstan)	Mohammad Ghareeb / Mohammad-Khaliq Siddiq; Alexey Kedryuk / Dmitriy Makeyev	6; 4	5; 7	4; 6	6; 3	2; 6
4	(Kuwait) (Kazakhstan)	Mohammad Ghareeb; Alexey Kedryuk	6; 3	6^{5} 7^{7}	4; 6	6; 2	11; 9
5	(Kuwait) (Kazakhstan)	Abdullah Maqdes; Dmitriy Makeyev	2; 6	6^{1} 7^{7}	6; 3	0; 6

=== Hong Kong vs. Pacific Oceania ===
Hong Kong
4
Victoria Park Tennis Centre, Hong Kong, China
10–12 February 2006
Hard

Pacific Oceania
1

			1	2	3	4	5
1	(Hong Kong) (Pacific Oceania)	Wayne Wong; Michael Leong	6; 4	4; 6	6; 2	6; 4
2	(Hong Kong) (Pacific Oceania)	Yu Hiu Tung; West Nott	6^{10} 7^{12}	4; 6	4; 6
3	(Hong Kong) (Pacific Oceania)	Martin Sayer / Wayne Wong; Michael Leong / West Nott	1; 6	6; 3	6; 4	6; 2
4	(Hong Kong) (Pacific Oceania)	Yu Hiu Tung; Juan Sebastien Langton	6; 2	6; 3	6; 0
5	(Hong Kong) (Pacific Oceania)	Michael Lai; Brett Baudinet	4; 6	6; 4	6; 4

=== Indonesia vs. Malaysia ===
Indonesia
5
Family Club, Balikpapan, East Kalimantan, Indonesia
10–12 February 2006
Hard

Malaysia
0

			1	2	3	4	5
1	(Indonesia) (Malaysia)	Suwandi Suwandi; Abd-Hazli Bin Zainuddin	6; 1	6; 2	6; 2
2	(Indonesia) (Malaysia)	Prima Simpatiaji; Razlan Rawi	6; 1	6; 0	6; 1
3	(Indonesia) (Malaysia)	Faisal Aidil / Suwandi Suwandi; Muhammad-Ashaari Bin Zainal-Abidin / Abd-Hazli Bin Zainuddin	6; 0	6; 1	6; 0
4	(Indonesia) (Malaysia)	Elbert Sie; Mohammed-Faizal Bin Othman	6; 1	6; 0
5	(Indonesia) (Malaysia)	Faisal Aidil; Muhammad-Ashaari Bin Zainal-Abidin	6; 1	6; 4

== Second round ==
=== Kazakhstan vs. New Zealand ===
Kazakhstan
3
Sports Complex Baganashil, Almaty, Kazakhstan
7–9 April 2006
Hard (indoors)

New Zealand
2

			1	2	3	4	5
1	(Kazakhstan) (New Zealand)	Alexey Kedryuk; Adam Thompson	6; 2	6; 1	6; 3
2	(Kazakhstan) (New Zealand)	Dmitriy Makeyev; Daniel King-Turner	6; 4	6; 4	3; 6	6; 3
3	(Kazakhstan) (New Zealand)	Alexey Kedryuk / Dmitriy Makeyev; Alistair Hunt / Daniel King-Turner	7; 5	6; 4	6^{6} 7^{8}	7^{7} 6^{5}
4	(Kazakhstan) (New Zealand)	Igor Chaldounov; Jose Statham	1; 6	2; 6
5	(Kazakhstan) (New Zealand)	Vitaliy Pavlov; Adam Thompson	0; 6	3; 6

=== Indonesia vs. Hong Kong ===
Indonesia
5
Pores Tennis Club, Surabaya, Indonesia
7–9 April 2006
Hard

Hong Kong
0

			1	2	3	4	5
1	(Indonesia) (Hong Kong)	Prima Simpatiaji; Wayne Wong	6; 4	6; 3	2; 6	6; 3
2	(Indonesia) (Hong Kong)	Febi Widhiyanto; Yu Hiu Tung	6; 3	6; 4	6; 4
3	(Indonesia) (Hong Kong)	Suwandi Suwandi / Bonit Wiryawan; Wayne Wong / Yu Hiu Tung	1; 6	6; 3	6; 4	3; 6	6; 2
4	(Indonesia) (Hong Kong)	Prima Simpatiaji; Michael Lai	7; 5	6; 2
5	(Indonesia) (Hong Kong)	Febi Widhiyanto; Jason Sankey	6; 3	6; 0

== Relegation play-offs ==
=== Lebanon vs. Kuwait ===
Lebanon
0
ATCL Club, Jounieh, Lebanon
7–9 April 2006
Clay

Kuwait
5

			1	2	3	4	5
1	(Lebanon) (Kuwait)	Antoine Breikeh; Abdullah Maqdes	1; 6	1; 6	1; 6
2	(Lebanon) (Kuwait)	John El Khoury; Mohammad Ghareeb	3; 6	1; 6	0; 6
3	(Lebanon) (Kuwait)	Georgio Bedran / Antoine Breikeh; Mohammad Ghareeb / Mohammad-Khaliq Siddiq	1; 6	1; 6	3; 6
4	(Lebanon) (Kuwait)	Georgio Bedran; Ahmad Rabeea Muhammad	1; 6	4; 6
5	(Lebanon) (Kuwait)	Ibrahim Abou Chahine; Abdullah Maqdes	1; 6	0; 6

=== Pacific Oceania vs. Malaysia ===
Pacific Oceania
3
Ligue Caledonienne de Tennis, Nouméa, New Caledonia
7–9 April 2006
Hard

Malaysia
2

			1	2	3	4	5
1	(Pacific Oceania) (Malaysia)	West Nott; Si Yew Ming	6; 2	6; 1	2; 1			retired
2	(Pacific Oceania) (Malaysia)	Michael Leong; Selvam Veerasingam	6; 3	6; 3	6; 1
3	(Pacific Oceania) (Malaysia)	Brett Baudinet / Juan Sebastien Langton; Si Yew Ming / Selvam Veerasingam	4; 6	6^{6} 7^{8}	6; 3	6^{3} 7^{7}
4	(Pacific Oceania) (Malaysia)	Michael Leong; Si Yew Ming	6; 3	6; 2	6; 2
5	(Pacific Oceania) (Malaysia)	Juan Sebastien Langton; Selvam Veerasingam	6; 2	6; 1	4; 5			retired

== Third round ==
=== Kazakhstan vs. Indonesia ===
Kazakhstan
3
Sports Complex Baganashil, Almaty, Kazakhstan
22–24 September 2006
Hard (indoors)

Indonesia
2

			1	2	3	4	5
1	(Kazakhstan) (Indonesia)	Dmitriy Makeyev; Suwandi Suwandi	3; 6	4; 6	4; 6
2	(Kazakhstan) (Indonesia)	Alexey Kedryuk; Prima Simpatiaji	6; 3	6^{2} 7^{7}	6; 4	7^{7} 6^{3}
3	(Kazakhstan) (Indonesia)	Alexey Kedryuk / Anton Tsymbalov; Suwandi Suwandi / Bonit Wiryawan	7; 5	3; 6	3; 6	6^{7} 7^{9}
4	(Kazakhstan) (Indonesia)	Alexey Kedryuk; Elbert Sie	6; 2	6; 4	6; 2
5	(Kazakhstan) (Indonesia)	Anton Tsymbalov; Prima Simpatiaji	7^{7} 6^{2}	6; 4	3; 6	6; 3
