= 1998 Fed Cup Asia/Oceania Zone Group I – Initial Pool C =

Initial Group C of the 1998 Fed Cup Asia/Oceania Zone Group I was one of six pools in the Asia/Oceania Zone Group I of the 1998 Fed Cup. Three teams competed in a round robin competition with the team coming first advancing to Placement Pool A, the team coming second going to Placement Pool B, and the team coming last falling to Placement Pool C.

	(New Zealand) NZL	(Thailand) THA	(Philippines) PHI	RR; W–L	Set; W–L	Game; W–L	Standings
New Zealand		2–1	3–0	2–0	10–4	76–48	1
Thailand	1–2		3–0	1–1	10–4	77–55	2
Philippines	0–3	0–3		0–2	0–12	24–74	3

== New Zealand vs. Thailand ==
New Zealand
2
Thana City Golf Club, Samutpakarn, Thailand
16 February 1998
Hard (outdoors)

Thailand
1

			1	2	3
1	(New Zealand) (Thailand)	Leanne Baker; Suvimol Duangchan	4; 6	6; 3	8; 6
2	(New Zealand) (Thailand)	Rewa Hudson; Tamarine Tanasugarn	3; 6	1; 6
3	(New Zealand) (Thailand)	Leanne Baker / Rewa Hudson; Benjamas Sangaram / Tamarine Tanasugarn	6^{4} 7^{7}	6; 4	6; 1

== Thailand vs. Philippines ==
Thailand
3
Thana City Golf Club, Samutpakarn, Thailand
17 February 1998
Hard (outdoors)

Philippines
0

			1	2	3
1	(Thailand) (Philippines)	Suvimol Duangchan; Pamela Floro	7; 5	7; 5
2	(Thailand) (Philippines)	Tamarine Tanasugarn; Marisue Jacutin	6; 3	6; 2
3	(Thailand) (Philippines)	Benjamas Sangaram / Tamarine Tanasugarn; Pamela Floro / Jennifer Saret	6; 0	6; 0

== New Zealand vs. Philippines ==
New Zealand
3
Thana City Golf Club, Samutpakarn, Thailand
18 February 1998
Hard (outdoors)

Philippines
0

			1	2	3
1	(New Zealand) (Philippines)	Leanne Baker; Pamela Floro	6; 0	6; 1
2	(New Zealand) (Philippines)	Rewa Hudson; Marisue Jacutin	6; 3	6; 2
3	(New Zealand) (Philippines)	Shelley Stephens / Niki Tippins; Pamela Floro / Jennifer Saret	6; 1	6; 2

== See also ==
- Fed Cup structure
