= 2000 Fed Cup Asia/Oceania Zone Group I – Pool A =

Group A of the 2000 Fed Cup Asia/Oceania Zone Group I was one of two pools in the Asia/Oceania Zone Group I of the 2000 Fed Cup. Five teams competed in a round robin competition, with the top team advancing to the Group I play-off, the winner of which would advance to World Group II Play-offs, and the bottom team being relegated down to 2000 Group II.

	(Japan) JPN	(India) IND	(Thailand) THA	(Kazakhstan) KAZ	(Hong Kong) HKG	RR; W–L	Set; W–L	Game; W–L	Standings
Japan		2–0	1–2	3–0	3–0	4–0	19–4	129–60	1
India	0–2		2–1	3–0	3–0	3–1	16–6	114–86	2
Thailand	2–1	1–2		2–0	2–1	2–2	15–10	129–102	3
Kazakhstan	0–3	0–3	0–2		2–1	1–3	4–20	71–128	4
Hong Kong	0–3	0–3	1–2	1–2		0–4	7–21	91–158	5

== India vs. Thailand ==
India
2
Utsubo Tennis Center, Osaka, Japan
25 April 2000
Decoturf (outdoors)

Thailand
1

			1	2	3
1	(India) (Thailand)	Sai Jayalakshmy Jayaram; Napaporn Tongsalee	6; 4	6; 2
2	(India) (Thailand)	Nirupama Vaidyanathan; Tamarine Tanasugarn	3; 6	3; 6
3	(India) (Thailand)	Manisha Malhotra / Nirupama Vaidyanathan; Benjamas Sangaram / Tamarine Tanasugarn	7^{10} 6^{8}	6; 2

== Kazakhstan vs. Hong Kong ==
Kazakhstan
2
Utsubo Tennis Center, Osaka, Japan
25 April 2000
Decoturf (outdoors)

Hong Kong
1

			1	2	3
1	(Kazakhstan) (Hong Kong)	Alissa Velts; Olivia Gravereaux	6; 4	3; 6	6; 4
2	(Kazakhstan) (Hong Kong)	Valeria Khazova; Tong Ka-po	1; 6	5; 7
3	(Kazakhstan) (Hong Kong)	Valeria Khazova / Alissa Velts; Olivia Gravereaux / Tong Ka-po	4; 6	6; 3	6; 4

== Japan vs. India ==
Japan
2
Utsubo Tennis Center, Osaka, Japan
26 April 2000
Decoturf (outdoors)

India
0

			1	2	3
1	(Japan) (India)	Shinobu Asagoe; Sai Jayalakshmy Jayaram	6; 3	6; 1
2	(Japan) (India)	Ai Sugiyama; Nirupama Vaidyanathan	6; 2	6; 3
3	(Japan) (India)	Nana Miyagi / Yuka Yoshida; Manisha Malhotra / Nirupama Vaidyanathan				not played

== Thailand vs. Kazakhstan ==
Thailand
2
Utsubo Tennis Center, Osaka, Japan
26 April 2000
Decoturf (outdoors)

Kazakhstan
0

			1	2	3
1	(Thailand) (Kazakhstan)	Napaporn Tongsalee; Alissa Velts	6; 0	6; 1
2	(Thailand) (Kazakhstan)	Tamarine Tanasugarn; Valeria Khazova	6; 0	6; 0
3	(Thailand) (Kazakhstan)	Benjamas Sangaram / Tamarine Tanasugarn; Valeria Khazova / Alissa Velts				not played

== Japan vs. Hong Kong ==
Japan
3
Utsubo Tennis Center, Osaka, Japan
27 April 2000
Decoturf (outdoors)

Hong Kong
0

			1	2	3
1	(Japan) (Hong Kong)	Yuka Yoshida; Chan Lee	6; 1	6; 2
2	(Japan) (Hong Kong)	Shinobu Asagoe; Tong Ka-po	6; 1	6; 1
3	(Japan) (Hong Kong)	Nana Miyagi / Ai Sugiyama; Olivia Gravereaux / Tong Ka-po	6; 1	6; 0

== India vs. Kazakhstan ==
India
3
Utsubo Tennis Center, Osaka, Japan
27 April 2000
Decoturf (outdoors)

Kazakhstan
0

			1	2	3
1	(India) (Kazakhstan)	Sai Jayalakshmy Jayaram; Alissa Velts	6; 2	6; 3
2	(India) (Kazakhstan)	Nirupama Vaidyanathan; Valeria Khazova	6; 2	6; 2
3	(India) (Kazakhstan)	Manisha Malhotra / Radhika Tulpule; Valeria Khazova / Alissa Velts	7^{7} 6^{5}	6; 4

== Japan vs. Kazakhstan ==
Japan
3
Utsubo Tennis Center, Osaka, Japan
28 April 2000
Decoturf (outdoors)

Kazakhstan
0

			1	2	3
1	(Japan) (Kazakhstan)	Nana Miyagi; Alissa Velts	7; 5	6; 3
2	(Japan) (Kazakhstan)	Yuka Yoshida; Valeria Khazova	6; 4	6; 1
3	(Japan) (Kazakhstan)	Shinobu Asagoe / Ai Sugiyama; Valeria Khazova / Alissa Velts	6; 1	6; 0

== Thailand vs. Hong Kong ==
Thailand
2
Utsubo Tennis Center, Osaka, Japan
28 April 2000
Decoturf (outdoors)

Hong Kong
1

			1	2	3
1	(Thailand) (Hong Kong)	Napaporn Tongsalee; Olivia Gravereaux	6^{5} 7^{7}	6; 1	11; 9
2	(Thailand) (Hong Kong)	Tamarine Tanasugarn; Tong Ka-po	6; 3	6; 4
3	(Thailand) (Hong Kong)	Monthika Anuchan / Benjamas Sangaram; Chan Lee / Lam Po Kuen	6^{2} 7^{7}	6; 1	1; 6

== Japan vs. Thailand ==
Japan
1
Utsubo Tennis Center, Osaka, Japan
29 April 2000
Decoturf (outdoors)

Thailand
2

			1	2	3
1	(Japan) (Thailand)	Shinobu Asagoe; Napaporn Tongsalee	6; 1	6; 0
2	(Japan) (Thailand)	Ai Sugiyama; Tamarine Tanasugarn	1; 6	3; 6
3	(Japan) (Thailand)	Nana Miyagi / Ai Sugiyama; Benjamas Sangaram / Tamarine Tanasugarn	7; 5	4; 6	5; 7

== India vs. Hong Kong ==
India
3
Utsubo Tennis Center, Osaka, Japan
29 April 2000
Decoturf (outdoors)

Hong Kong
0

			1	2	3
1	(India) (Hong Kong)	Sai Jayalakshmy Jayaram; Chan Lee	6; 2	6; 4
2	(India) (Hong Kong)	Nirupama Vaidyanathan; Tong Ka-po	6; 1	7; 5
3	(India) (Hong Kong)	Manisha Malhotra / Nirupama Vaidyanathan; Chan Lee / Lam Po Kuen	6; 3	6; 2

- Hong Kong failed to win any ties in the pool, and thus was relegated to Group II in 2002, where they finished second overall and thus advanced back into Group I for 2002.

== See also ==
- Fed Cup structure
