= Rewa Hudson =

New Zealand tennis player

- Country (sports): New Zealand
- Born: 15 September 1980 (age 44); New Zealand
- Turned pro: 1997
- Retired: 2001
- Plays: Right-handed (two-handed backhand)
- Prize money: US$ 21,658

Singles
- Career record: 66–62
- Career titles: 0 WTA, 0 ITF
- Highest ranking: No. 318 (16 February 1998)

Grand Slam singles results
- Australian Open Junior: 3R (1998)
- French Open Junior: 1R (1998)
- Wimbledon Junior: 1R (1998)
- US Open Junior: 1R (1998)

Doubles
- Career record: 47–39
- Career titles: 0 WTA, 7 ITF
- Highest ranking: No. 293 (7 December 1998)

Grand Slam doubles results
- Australian Open Junior: F (1998)
- French Open Junior: 1R (1998)
- Wimbledon Junior: 1R (1998)
- US Open Junior: 2R (1998)

Team competitions
- Fed Cup: 8–10
- Last updated on: 3 April 2017.

Rewa Harriman (née Hudson; born 15 September 1980) is a retired New Zealand female tennis player.

Hudson has won seven doubles titles on the ITF circuit in her career. On 16 February 1998, she reached her best singles ranking of world number 318. On 7 December 1998, she peaked at world number 293 in the doubles rankings.

Rewa Hudson retired from tennis 2001.

Playing for New Zealand at the Fed Cup, Hudson has a win–loss record of 8–10.

== Junior Grand Slam finals ==
=== Doubles: 1 (0–1) ===
Result	Year	Tournament	Surface	Partner	Opponents	Score
Runner-up	1998	Australian Open	Hard	(New Zealand) Leanne Baker	(Australia) Evie Dominikovic (Australia) Alicia Molik	3–6, 6–3, 2–6

== ITF finals (7–3) ==
=== Singles (0–2) ===
Legend $100,000 tournaments $75,000 tournaments $50,000 tournaments $25,000 tournaments $10,000 tournaments	Finals by surface Hard (0–1) Clay (0–1) Grass (0–0) Carpet (0–0)

Result	Date	Category	Tournament	Surface	Opponent	Score
Runner-up	8 February 1998	$10,000	Wellington, New Zealand	Hard	(Indonesia) Wynne Prakusya	5–7, 2–6
Runner-up	5 July 1999	$10,000	Amersfoort, Netherlands	Clay	(Serbia and Montenegro) Katarina Mišić	5–7, 3–6

=== Doubles (7–1) ===
Legend $100,000 tournaments $75,000 tournaments $50,000 tournaments $25,000 tournaments $10,000 tournaments	Finals by surface Hard (1–0) Clay (5–1) Grass (0–0) Carpet (1–0)

Result	Date	Category	Tournament	Surface	Partner	Opponents	Score
Winner	6 February 1999	$10,000	Wellington, New Zealand	Hard	(New Zealand) Leanne Baker	(Australia) Gail Biggs (New Zealand) Shelley Stephens	6–1, 6–1
Winner	25 April 1999	$10,000	Hvar, Croatia	Clay	(New Zealand) Shelley Stephens	(Ukraine) Valeria Bondarenko (Ukraine) Alona Bondarenko	6–2, 4–6, 6–3
Winner	26 September 1999	$10,000	Horb, Germany	Clay	(Italy) Mara Santangelo	(Slovakia) Eva Fislová (Slovakia) Andrea Šebová	6–2, 6–2
Runner-up	16 August 1999	$10,000	Koksijde, Belgium	Clay	(New Zealand) Shelley Stephens	(China) Li Ting (China) Li Na	3–6, 2–6
Winner	30 August 1999	$10,000	Bad Saulgau, Germany	Clay	(New Zealand) Shelley Stephens	(Germany) Caroline Raba (Germany) Julia Schruff	6–7^{(7–9)}, 6–3, 6–0
Winner	27 March 2000	$10,000	Kalamata, Greece	Carpet	(New Zealand) Shelley Stephens	(Romania) Adriana Burz (Croatia) Lana Miholček	6–1, 6–0
Winner	5 June 2000	$10,000	Vaduz, Liechtenstein	Clay	(New Zealand) Shelley Stephens	(Czech Republic) Zuzana Hejdová (Czech Republic) Jana Macurová	6–2, 2–6, 6–2
Winner	30 August 1999	$10,000	Bad Saulgau, Germany	Clay	(New Zealand) Liz Finlayson	(Czech Republic) Zuzana Hejdová (Czech Republic) Petra Novotniková	6–0, 6–4

== Fed Cup participation ==
=== Singles ===
Edition	Stage	Date	Location	Against	Surface	Opponent	W/L	Score
1997 Fed Cup; Asia/Oceania Zone Group I	R/R	11 March 1997	Wellington, New Zealand	(Indonesia) Indonesia	Hard	(Indonesia) Wynne Prakusya	L	1–6, 7–6^{(11–9)}, 4–6
1997 Fed Cup; Asia/Oceania Zone Group I	R/R	12 March 1997	Wellington, New Zealand	Chinese Taipei	Hard	(Chinese Taipei) Weng Tzu-ting	L	6–7^{(4–7)}, 6–1, 3–6
1997 Fed Cup; Asia/Oceania Zone Group I	R/R	13 March 1997	Wellington, New Zealand	India	Hard	(India) Uzma Khan	L	2–6, 3–6
1997 Fed Cup; Asia/Oceania Zone Group I	P/O	14 March 1997	Wellington, New Zealand	Kazakhstan	Hard	(Kazakhstan) Tatiana Babina	W	6–2, 6–3
1998 Fed Cup; Asia/Oceania Zone Group I	R/R	16 February 1998	Samut Prakan, Thailand	(Thailand) Thailand	Hard	(Thailand) Tamarine Tanasugarn	L	3–6, 1–6
1998 Fed Cup; Asia/Oceania Zone Group I	R/R	18 February 1998	Samut Prakan, Thailand	Philippines	Hard	(Philippines) Marisue Jacutin	W	6–3, 6–2
1998 Fed Cup; Asia/Oceania Zone Group I	P/O	20 February 1998	Samut Prakan, Thailand	Chinese Taipei	Hard	(Chinese Taipei) Wang Shi-ting	L	1–6, 4–6
1998 Fed Cup; Asia/Oceania Zone Group I	P/O	20 February 1998	Samut Prakan, Thailand	South Korea	Hard	(South Korea) Park Sung-hee	L	2–6, 5–7
1999 Fed Cup; Asia/Oceania Zone Group I	R/R	24 February 1999	Samut Prakan, Thailand	(Pacific Oceania) Pacific Oceania	Hard	(Pacific Oceania) Paiao-Asinata Short	W	6–1, 6–2
1999 Fed Cup; Asia/Oceania Zone Group I	R/R	25 February 1999	Samut Prakan, Thailand	China	Hard	(China) Lin Ya-Ming	L	6–0, 2–6, 3–6
2000 Fed Cup; Asia/Oceania Zone Group I	R/R	25 April 2000	Osaka, Japan	(Indonesia) Indonesia	Hard	(Indonesia) Yayuk Basuki	L	0–6, 1–6

=== Doubles ===
Edition	Stage	Date	Location	Against	Surface	Partner	Opponents	W/L	Score
1997 Fed Cup; Asia/Oceania Zone Group I	P/O	15 March 1997	Wellington, New Zealand	Thailand	Hard	(New Zealand) Leanne Baker	Busrin Boontemleaw; Phorhathai Suksamran	W	6–1, 6–1
1998 Fed Cup; Asia/Oceania Zone Group I	R/R	16 February 1998	Samut Prakan, Thailand	(Thailand) Thailand	Hard	(New Zealand) Leanne Baker	Benjamas Sangaram; Tamarine Tanasugarn	W	6–7^{(4–7)}, 6–4, 6–1
1998 Fed Cup; Asia/Oceania Zone Group I	P/O	20 February 1998	Samut Prakan, Thailand	Chinese Taipei	Hard	(New Zealand) Leanne Baker	Janet Lee; Wang Shi-ting	W	6–4, 6–4
1999 Fed Cup; Asia/Oceania Zone Group I	R/R	22 February 1999	Samut Prakan, Thailand	(South Korea) South Korea	Hard	(New Zealand) Leanne Baker	Choi Young-ja; Park Sung-hee	L	3–6, 4–6
1999 Fed Cup; Asia/Oceania Zone Group I	R/R	24 February 1999	Samut Prakan, Thailand	Pacific Oceania	Hard	(New Zealand) Niki Tippins	Davilyn Godinet; Simone Wichman	W	6–1, 6–0
2000 Fed Cup; Asia/Oceania Zone Group I	R/R	25 April 2000	Osaka, Japan	(Indonesia) Indonesia	Hard	(New Zealand) Shelley Stephens	Yayuk Basuki; Wynne Prakusya	L	4–6, 2–6
2000 Fed Cup; Asia/Oceania Zone Group I	R/R	27 April 2000	Osaka, Japan	Singapore	Hard	(New Zealand) Shelley Stephens	Tina Jacob; Leow Yik-Hui	W	6–0, 6–0

== ITF junior results ==
=== Singles (2/1) ===
Legend
Junior Grand Slam
Category GA
Category G1
Category G2
Category G3
Category G4
Category G5

Outcome	No.	Date	Tournament	Location	Surface	Opponent	Score
Winner	1.	18 November 1996	Malaysian International Junior Championships	Kuala Lumpur, Malaysia	Hard	(New Zealand) Leanne Baker	6–4, 6–0
Winner	2.	26 October 1997	Thailand Open Junior Championships	Bang Phli, Thailand	Hard	(New Zealand) Leanne Baker	6–4, 6–2
Runner-up	1.	14 January 1998	Victorian Junior Championships	Traralgon, Australia	Hard	(Australia) Jelena Dokic	3–6, 3–6

=== Doubles (5/5) ===
Legend
Junior Grand Slam
Category GA
Category G1
Category G2
Category G3
Category G4
Category G5

Outcome	No.	Date	Tournament	Location	Surface	Partner	Opponents	Score
Winner	1.	18 November 1996	Malaysian International Junior Championships	Kuala Lumpur, Malaysia	Hard	(New Zealand) Leanne Baker	(Japan) Kaori Aoyama (Japan) Satomi Kinjo	6–2, 6–1
Runner-up	1.	5 July 1997	41st Orangina Van Keeken Tournament	Castricum, Netherlands	Clay	(New Zealand) Leanne Baker	(Slovakia) Stanislava Hrozenská (Czech Republic) Veronika Koksová	1–6, 1–6
Runner-up	2.	27 July 1997	Ex Pilsner Urguell Plzen	Plzeň, Czech Republic	Clay	(New Zealand) Leanne Baker	(Slovenia) Tina Hergold (Canada) Marie-Ève Pelletier	6–4, 3–6, 0–6
Runner-up	3.	12 October 1997	Hong Kong Open Junior Championships	Hong Kong	Hard	(New Zealand) Leanne Baker	(Indonesia) Diana Laksono (Hong Kong) Tong Ka-po	6–4, 3–6, 0–6
Winner	2.	19 October 1997	World Super Junior Championships	Tokyo, Japan	Hard	(New Zealand) Leanne Baker	(Japan) Shiho Hisamatsu (Japan) Remi Tezuka	7–5, 4–6, 6–2
Winner	3.	26 October 1997	Thailand Open Junior Championships	Bang Phli, Thailand	Hard	(New Zealand) Leanne Baker	(Thailand) Suchanun Viratprasert (Thailand) Orawan Wongkamalasai	6–3, 6–3
Winner	4.	14 January 1998	Victorian Junior Championships	Traralgon, Australia	Hard	(New Zealand) Leanne Baker	(Australia) Melanie-Ann Clayton (Australia) Nicole Sewell	6–1, 2–6, 6–4
Winner	5.	24 January 1998	Australian Hardcourt Junior Championships	Melbourne, Australia	Hard	(New Zealand) Leanne Baker	(Croatia) Jelena Kostanić Tošić (Slovenia) Katarina Srebotnik	6–4, 0–6, 6–2
Runner-up	4.	1 February 1998	Australian Open Junior Championships	Melbourne, Australia	Hard	(New Zealand) Leanne Baker	(Australia) Evie Dominikovic (Australia) Alicia Molik	3–6, 6–3, 2–6
Runner-up	5.	6 September 1998	Les Internationaux Junior Videotron Du Canada	Quebec, Canada	Hard	(New Zealand) Leanne Baker	(Belgium) Kim Clijsters (Denmark) Eva Dyrberg	6–7, 6–4, 2–6
