= Tennis at the 2005 South Pacific Mini Games =

Tennis at the 2005 South Pacific Mini Games in Koror was held on July 26, August 3, 2005.

== Medal summary ==
=== Medal table ===
Rank	Nation	Gold	Silver	Bronze	Total
1	New Caledonia (NCL)	5	1	2	8
2	Samoa (SAM)	1	4	2	7
3	Cook Islands (COK)	1	0	0	1
4	Marshall Islands (MHL)	0	1	0	1
4	Solomon Islands (SOL)	0	1	0	1
6	American Samoa (ASA)	0	0	1	1
6	Palau (PLW)	0	0	1	1
6	Papua New Guinea (PNG)	0	0	1	1
Totals (8 entries)		7	7	7	21

=== Medals events ===
Event	Gold	Silver	Bronze
Men's Singles	(Cook Islands) Cook Islands; Brett Baudinet	(Marshall Islands) Marshall Islands; West Nott	(Samoa) Samoa; Juan Langton
Women's Singles	(New Caledonia) New Caledonia; Stéphanie Di Luccio	(Samoa) Samoa; Maylani Ah Hoy	(New Caledonia) New Caledonia; Yumiko Justin
Men's Doubles	(New Caledonia) New Caledonia; Thibault Bousquet; Pierre Henri Guillaume	(Solomon Islands) Solomon Islands; Michael Leong; Junior Kari	(Samoa) Samoa; Juan Langton; Rennsford Penn
Women's Doubles	(New Caledonia) New Caledonia; Stéphanie Di Luccio; Yumiko Justin	(Samoa) Samoa; Maylani Ah Hoy; Kim Carruthers	(Papua New Guinea) Papua New Guinea; Nicole Angat; Vere Tere
Mixed Doubles	(Samoa) Samoa; Juan Langton; Maylani Ah Hoy	(New Caledonia) New Caledonia; Thibault Bousquet; Stéphanie Di Luccio	(New Caledonia) New Caledonia; Christophe Godot; Yumiko Justin
Men's Team	(New Caledonia) New Caledonia; Thibault Bousquet; Christophe Godot; Pierre Henri Guillaume; Nickolas N’Godrela	(Samoa) Samoa; Juan Langton; Reinsford Penn; Wilson Matautia	(American Samoa) American Samoa; Frankie Godinet; Muka Godinet; Chris Toli; Duncan Maetoloa
Women's Team	(New Caledonia) New Caledonia; Stéphanie Di Luccio; Yumiko Justin; Caroline Liwon; Dorianne Brehe	(Samoa) Samoa; Maylani Ah Hoy; Kim Carruthers; Rozlyn Tavita	(Palau) Palau; Kelsey Isechal; Kelly Koskelin; Akelina Tewid
