= Tennis at the 2007 South Pacific Games =

- Location: Apia
- Dates: 27 August–6 September 2007

Tennis at the 2007 Pacific Games in Apia was held on August 27 – September 6, 2007.

== Medal summary ==
=== Medal table ===
Rank	Nation	Gold	Silver	Bronze	Total
1	Samoa (SAM)	4	2	0	6
2	New Caledonia (NCL)	3	3	2	8
3	Solomon Islands (SOL)	1	0	1	2
4	Papua New Guinea (PNG)	0	1	1	2
5	French Polynesia (TAH)	0	0	2	2
6	American Samoa (ASA)	0	0	1	1
Totals (6 entries)		8	6	7	21

=== Medals events ===
Event	Gold	Silver	Bronze
Men's Singles	(Solomon Islands) Solomon Islands; Michael Leong	(Samoa) Samoa; Juan Langton	(New Caledonia) New Caledonia; Julien Couly
Women's Singles	(New Caledonia) New Caledonia; Élodie Rogge	(New Caledonia) New Caledonia; Stéphanie Di Luccio	(Papua New Guinea) Papua New Guinea; Abigail Tere-Apisah
Men's Doubles	(New Caledonia) New Caledonia; Gabriel Ledru; Nickolas N’Godrela	(Samoa) Samoa; Juan Langton; Leon So'Onalole	(French Polynesia) Tahiti; Bruno Laitame; Landry Lee Tham
Women's Doubles	(Samoa) Samoa; Maylani Ah Hoy; Tagifano So'Onalole	(Papua New Guinea) Papua New Guinea; Nicole Angat; Abigail Tere-Apisah	(American Samoa) American Samoa; Salani Lesa-Pita; Florence Wasko
Mixed Doubles	(Samoa) Samoa; Maylani Ah Hoy; Leon So'Onalole	(New Caledonia) New Caledonia; Stéphanie Di Luccio; Nickolas N’Godrela	(New Caledonia) New Caledonia; Élodie Rogge; Gabriel Ledru
Men's Team	(New Caledonia) New Caledonia; Julien Couly; Christophe Godot; Gabriel Ledru; Nickolas N’Godrela	(Samoa) Samoa; Juan Langton; Reinsford Penn; Leon So'Onalole; Marvin So'Onalole	(Solomon Islands) Solomon Islands; Michael Leong; Junior Kari; Johnson Taliki; Duncan Maetoloa
Women's Team-	(Samoa) Samoa; Tagifano So'Onalole; Maylani Ah Hoy; Shantal Tavita; Steffi Carruthers	(New Caledonia) New Caledonia; Élodie Rogge; Stéphanie Di Luccio; Anaève Pain; Dorianne Brehe	(French Polynesia) Tahiti; Catherine Yan; Ravahere Rauzy; Estelle Tehau

== See also ==
- Tennis at the Pacific Games
