= Nicole Angat =

Papua New Guinean tennis player

- Country (sports): Papua New Guinea; Pacific Oceania (Fed Cup tournaments)
- Born: 9 April 1982 (age 43) Port Moresby, Papua New Guinea
- Turned pro: 2000
- Retired: 2008
- Plays: Right-handed (two-handed backhand)

Team competitions
- Fed Cup: 3–7
Medal record
yes
Representing Papua New Guinea
Women's Tennis
Pacific Games
Silver medal – second place	2007 Apia	Doubles
South Pacific Mini Games
Bronze medal – third place	2005 Palau	Doubles

Nicole Angat (born 9 April 1982) is a retired Papua New Guinean female tennis player.

Playing for Pacific Oceania at the Fed Cup, Angat had a win–loss record of 3–7.

She won the Pacific Games Silver Medal in Women's Doubles along with Abigail Tere-Apisah.

Angat retired from tennis in 2008.

== Other finals ==
=== Doubles ===
Outcome	Date	Tournament	Location	Partnered	Opponents	Score
Silver Medal	September 2007	2007 South Pacific Games	Apia, Samoa	(Papua New Guinea) Abigail Tere-Apisah	(Samoa) Maylani Ah Hoy (Samoa) Tagifano So'Onalole	6–4, 2–6, 2–6

== Fed Cup participation ==
=== Singles ===
Edition	Date	Location	Against	Surface	Opponent	W/L	Score
2000 Fed Cup; Asia/Oceania Zone II	26 April 2000	Osaka, Japan	(Fiji) Fiji	Hard	(Fiji) Hamidan Bibi	W	6–1, 6–2
2001 Fed Cup; Asia/Oceania Zone II	9 April 2001	Kaohsiung, Taiwan	(Indonesia) Indonesia	Hard	(Indonesia) Romana Tedjakusuma	L	0–6, 0–6
2001 Fed Cup; Asia/Oceania Zone II	10 April 2001	Kaohsiung, Taiwan	India	Hard	(India) Manisha Malhotra	L	1–6, 1–6
2001 Fed Cup; Asia/Oceania Zone II	12 April 2001	Kaohsiung, Taiwan	South Korea	Hard	(South Korea) Choi Jin-young	L	1–6, 1–6
2001 Fed Cup; Asia/Oceania Zone II	13 April 2001	Kaohsiung, Taiwan	New Zealand	Hard	(New Zealand) Tracey O'Connor	L	3–6, 0–6

=== Doubles ===
Edition	Date	Location	Against	Surface	Partner	Opponents	W/L	Score
2000 Fed Cup; Asia/Oceania Zone II	27 April 2000	Osaka, Japan	(Iraq) Iraq	Hard	(Pacific Oceania) Davilyn Godinet	(Iraq) Alaa A. A. Ali (Iraq) Salima-Esmat Salman	W	6–0, 6–1
2000 Fed Cup; Asia/Oceania Zone II	29 April 2000	Osaka, Japan	Malaysia	Hard	(Pacific Oceania) Davilyn Godinet	(Malaysia) Keng Pei-Yuin (Malaysia) Sangaram Shangamitra	W	6–4, 6–3
2001 Fed Cup; Asia/Oceania Zone II	9 April 2001	Kaohsiung, Taiwan	(Indonesia) Indonesia	Hard	(Pacific Oceania) Davilyn Godinet	(Indonesia) Yayuk Basuki (Indonesia) Wukirasih Sawondari	L	2–6, 2–6
2001 Fed Cup; Asia/Oceania Zone II	10 April 2001	Kaohsiung, Taiwan	India	Hard	(Pacific Oceania) Davilyn Godinet	(India) Rushmi Chakravarthi (India) Sai Jayalakshmy Jayaram	L	1–6, 1–6
2001 Fed Cup; Asia/Oceania Zone II	12 April 2001	Kaohsiung, Taiwan	South Korea	Hard	(Pacific Oceania) Irene Mani	(South Korea) Chae Kyung-yee (South Korea) Chung Yang-jin	L	0–6, 0–6

== ITF junior results ==
=== Singles (1/2) ===
Junior Grand Slam
Category GA
Category G1
Category G2
Category G3
Category G4
Category G5

Outcome	No.	Date	Tournament	Location	Surface	Opponent	Score
Winner	1.	5 September 1998	9th South Pacific Closed Junior Championships	Tafuna, American Samoa	Hard	(American Samoa) Davilyn Godinet	6–4, 6–4
Runner-up	1.	3 September 1998	10th South Pacific Closed Junior Championships	Lautoka, Fiji	Hard	(American Samoa) Davilyn Godinet	6–7^{(5–7)}, 6–7^{(3–7)}
Runner-up	2.	7 September 2000	Pacific Oceania Junior Circuit	Apia, Samoa	Hard	(American Samoa) Davilyn Godinet	1–6, 6–7^{(4–7)}

=== Doubles (1/1) ===
Junior Grand Slam
Category GA
Category G1
Category G2
Category G3
Category G4
Category G5

Outcome	No.	Date	Tournament	Location	Surface	Partner	Opponents	Score
Winner	1.	3 September 1998	10th South Pacific Closed Junior Championships	Lautoka, Fiji	Hard	(Solomon Islands) Gurianna Korinihona	(American Samoa) Davilyn Godinet (American Samoa) Crystal Schwenke	7–6^{(7–5)}, 7–5
Runner-up	1.	7 September 2000	Pacific Oceania Junior Circuit	Apia, Samoa	Hard	(Papua New Guinea) Kali Marase	(American Samoa) Alisha Godinet (American Samoa) Davilyn Godinet	3–6, 0–6
