= Tracey O'Connor =

New Zealand tennis player

- Country (sports): New Zealand
- Born: 24 September 1982 (age 42); Tokoroa, New Zealand
- Turned pro: 1998
- Retired: 2006
- Plays: Right-handed (two-handed backhand)
- Prize money: $14,450

Singles
- Career record: 56–64
- Career titles: 0
- Highest ranking: No. 417 (8 July 2002)

Doubles
- Career record: 22–36
- Career titles: 0
- Highest ranking: No. 460 (3 December 2001)

Team competitions
- Fed Cup: 2–2
- Last updated on: 1 April 2017.

Tracey O'Connor (born 24 September 1982 in Tokoroa) is a retired New Zealand tennis player. O'Connor is New Zealand Māori, of the Ngāti Raukawa iwi (tribe).

On 8 July 2002, she reached her best singles ranking of world number 417. On 3 December 2001, she peaked at world number 460 in the doubles rankings. O'Connor retired from tennis in 2006.

Playing for New Zealand at the Fed Cup, O'Connor has a win–loss record of 2–2.

== ITF finals (0–2) ==
=== Doubles (0–2) ===
Legend $100,000 tournaments $75,000 tournaments $50,000 tournaments $25,000 tournaments $10,000 tournaments	Finals by surface Hard (0–1) Clay (0–1) Grass (0–0) Carpet (0–0)

Result	No.	Date	Category	Tournament	Surface	Partner	Opponents	Score
Runner-up	1.	1 July 2001	$10,000	Edmond, United States	Hard	(New Zealand) Ilke Gers	(United States) Michelle Dasso (United States) Julie Ditty	4–6, 5–7
Runner-up	2.	30 September 2001	$10,000	Raleigh, United States	Clay	(New Zealand) Leanne Baker	(United States) Allison Baker (Hungary) Melinda Czink	4–6, 6–1, 4–6

== Fed Cup participation ==
=== Singles ===
Edition	Stage	Date	Location	Against	Surface	Opponent	W/L	Score
2001 Fed Cup; Asia/Oceania Zone Group I	R/R	11 April 2001	Kaohsiung, Taiwan	India	Hard	(India) Manisha Malhotra	W	6–1, 3–6, 6–3
2001 Fed Cup; Asia/Oceania Zone Group I	R/R	13 April 2001	Kaohsiung, Taiwan	Pacific Oceania	Hard	(Pacific Oceania) Nicole Angat	W	6–3, 6–0
2002 Fed Cup; Asia/Oceania Zone Group I	R/R	4 March 2002	Guangzhou, China	(South Korea) South Korea	Hard	(South Korea) Jeon Mi-ra	L	0–6, 3–6
2002 Fed Cup; Asia/Oceania Zone Group I	R/R	5 March 2002	Guangzhou, China	Chinese Taipei	Hard	(Chinese Taipei) Chan Chin-wei	L	0–6, 6–3, 0–6

== ITF junior results ==
=== Singles (2/2) ===
Legend
Junior Grand Slam
Category GA
Category G1
Category G2
Category G3
Category G4
Category G5

Outcome	No.	Date	Tournament	Location	Surface	Opponent	Score
Runner-up	1.	19 July 1998	New Zealand 18 & Under Indoor Championships	Auckland, New Zealand	Hard	(Australia) Monique Adamczak	6–4, 0–6, 3–6
Winner	1.	18 July 1999	Jetsave New Zealand 18 & Under Indoor Championships	Auckland, New Zealand	Hard	(Australia) Lauren Breadmore	6–4, 6–0
Winner	2.	13 February 2000	Auckland 18 & Under Summer Championships	Auckland, New Zealand	Hard	(Australia) Asha Burns	6–0, 6–3
Runner-up	2.	16 April 2000	Japan Open Junior Championships	Nagoya, Japan	Carpet	(United Kingdom) Jane O'Donoghue	6–3, 0–6, 5–7

=== Doubles (1/1) ===
Legend
Junior Grand Slam
Category GA
Category G1
Category G2
Category G3
Category G4
Category G5

Outcome	No.	Date	Tournament	Location	Surface	Partner	Opponents	Score
Winner	1.	18 July 1999	Jetsave New Zealand 18 & Under Indoor Championships	Auckland, New Zealand	Hard	(New Zealand) Ilke Gers	(New Zealand) Eden Marama (New Zealand) Paula Marama	6–4, 7–5
Runner-up	1.	26 March 2000	Singapore International Junior Championships	Singapore	Hard	(Australia) Nicole Kriz	(Indonesia) Dea Sumantri (Indonesia) Angelique Widjaja	5–7, 6–3, 0–6
