= West Nott =

Marshallese tennis player and coach

- Born: June 8, 1982
- Education: University of Florida; Georgia Institute of Technology
- Occupation(s): Tennis player and Coach

West Nott
Medal record

Tennis

Representing Marshall Islands

South Pacific Mini Games
Silver medal – second place	2005 Palau	Singles

West Lee Nott (born June 8, 1982) is the Head Coach of the Women's Tennis Team at UTRGV, University of Texas at Rio Grande Valley.

== Personal ==
Nott is the son of Sam and Elizabeth Nott. He has one brother, Noah, who graduated from the University of Washington and one sister, Shimiko, who graduated from Princeton Theological Seminary. A right-hander, he stands 1.72m and weighs 160 pounds.

== Coaching career ==
Before accepting his current position at UTRGV, West coached the Women's Tennis Team at the USC as Women's Assistant Coach. Prior to his work at USC, he volunteered his services as Men's Assistant Coach at the University of Washington where they reached the top 10 NCAA and Sweet Sixteen at the NCAA Tournament where they beat both USC and UCLA in the Pac-10 Conference.

West began his career at USC in the summer of 2007 alongside Head Coach Richard Gallien. After 6 years, he has helped the Trojans win three Pac-12 Team Championships (2009, 2012, 2013). During the summer of 2012, he was promoted to Associate Head Coach. In 2013, he coached Sabrina Santamaria and Kaitlyn Christian to win the NCAA Doubles Championships. West has helped USC win 5 individual national titles (1 singles, 4 doubles). The doubles tandem of Christian and Santamaria are considered the greatest doubles tandem in women's college tennis history with 2 National Indoor Championships, 1 All-American Championships, and 1 NCAA Championships. Christian and Santamaria competed in the 2013 US Open Mixed Doubles Championships and have earned a wild card to the 2014 US Open Women's Doubles Championships.

During the summer of 2013, West traveled full-time with 2-time NCAA Singles Champion Nicole Gibbs of Stanford to WTA La Costa, WTA Cincinnati, and US Open.

West has coached 4 former players who reached the NCAA #1 singles ranking. The players include Maria Sanchez, Amanda Fink, Lindsey Nelson, and Sabrina Santamaria. In 2013, Maria Sanchez was the highest ranked college graduate on the WTA Tour with a career high ranking of #107 WTA. Danielle Lao has shown recent success on the tour and she has shared her college tennis experience in a book titled "The Invaluable Experience."

== Playing career ==
Nott won the 1998 U.S. National Indoor Boys 16 Championship and finishing that year ranked 10th in the national rankings. He was ranked No. 1 in the Midwest for three years in 1996-98 and a member of the U.S. Boys 16 National Team in junior tennis.

Nott transferred to Georgia Tech after playing his freshman year at the University of Florida. His notable accomplishments at Georgia Tech include reaching the ACC Team Championships finals and finishing 5th in the Georgia Tech All-Time Career Wins list in only three years. He earned a degree in Management.

West is a member of the Pacific Oceania Davis Cup team. He has competed against New Zealand, Malaysia, Hong Kong China, South Korea, Iran, and Pakistan. In 2007 he clinched the deciding match against Pakistan. In 2011 he won both of his singles matches versus Iran.

In 2006, he partnered with his mother, Elizabeth Nott, to capture the Mother-Son US National Indoor Doubles Championship.
