= Michael Leong =

Solomon Islands tennis player

- Full name: Michael Patrick Leong
- Country (sports): Solomon Islands
- Born: 18 March 1986 (age 39)
- Plays: Right-handed
- Prize money: $12,640

Singles
- Highest ranking: No. 956 (22 June 2009)

Doubles
- Highest ranking: No. 536 (10 May 2010)
Medal record
Pacific Games
Gold medal – first place	2007 Apia	Singles
Bronze medal – third place	2007 Apia	Team
Bronze medal – third place	2011 Nouméa	Singles

Michael Patrick Leong (born 18 March 1986) is a Solomon Islands former professional tennis player. He played Davis Cup tennis for the combined regional Pacific Oceania team and amassed a team record 19 singles wins.

The most successful tennis player to come out of the Solomon Islands, Leong was the first person from his country to appear at Wimbledon (juniors in 2004) and in 2008 became the only Solomon Islander to be ranked by the ATP. His best ranking was in doubles (536 in the world) and he won two ITF Futures doubles titles.

Leong won the Solomon Islands' only gold medal of the 2007 South Pacific Games, beating Samoa's Juan Langton in the singles final, then in 2010 competed at the Commonwealth Games in Kuala Lumpur, serving as the country's flag bearer in the opening ceremony.

== ITF Futures titles ==
=== Doubles: (2) ===
No.	Date	Tournament	Surface	Partner	Opponents	Score
1.	Jul 2009	Syria F1, Damascus	Hard	(Australia) Sadik Kadir	(Tunisia) Haythem Abid (Egypt) Motaz Abou El Khair	6–4, 3–6, [10–5]
2.	Mar 2010	China F2, Mengzi	Hard	(Germany) Sebastian Rieschick	(Chinese Taipei) Lee Hsin-han (Chinese Taipei) Yang Tsung-hua	6–2, 7–5
