= Jordan Billie Jean King Cup team =

The Jordan Fed Cup team represents Jordan in Fed Cup tennis competition and are governed by the Jordan Tennis Federation. They have not competed since 2007.

== History ==
Jordan competed in its first Fed Cup in 2000. Their best result was 7th in Asia/Oceania Group II final in 2000.

== See also ==
- Billie Jean King Cup
- Jordan Davis Cup team
