= Utsubo Tennis Center =

Tennis complex in Nishi-ku, Osaka, Japan

Coordinates: 34.68468°N 135.492033°E

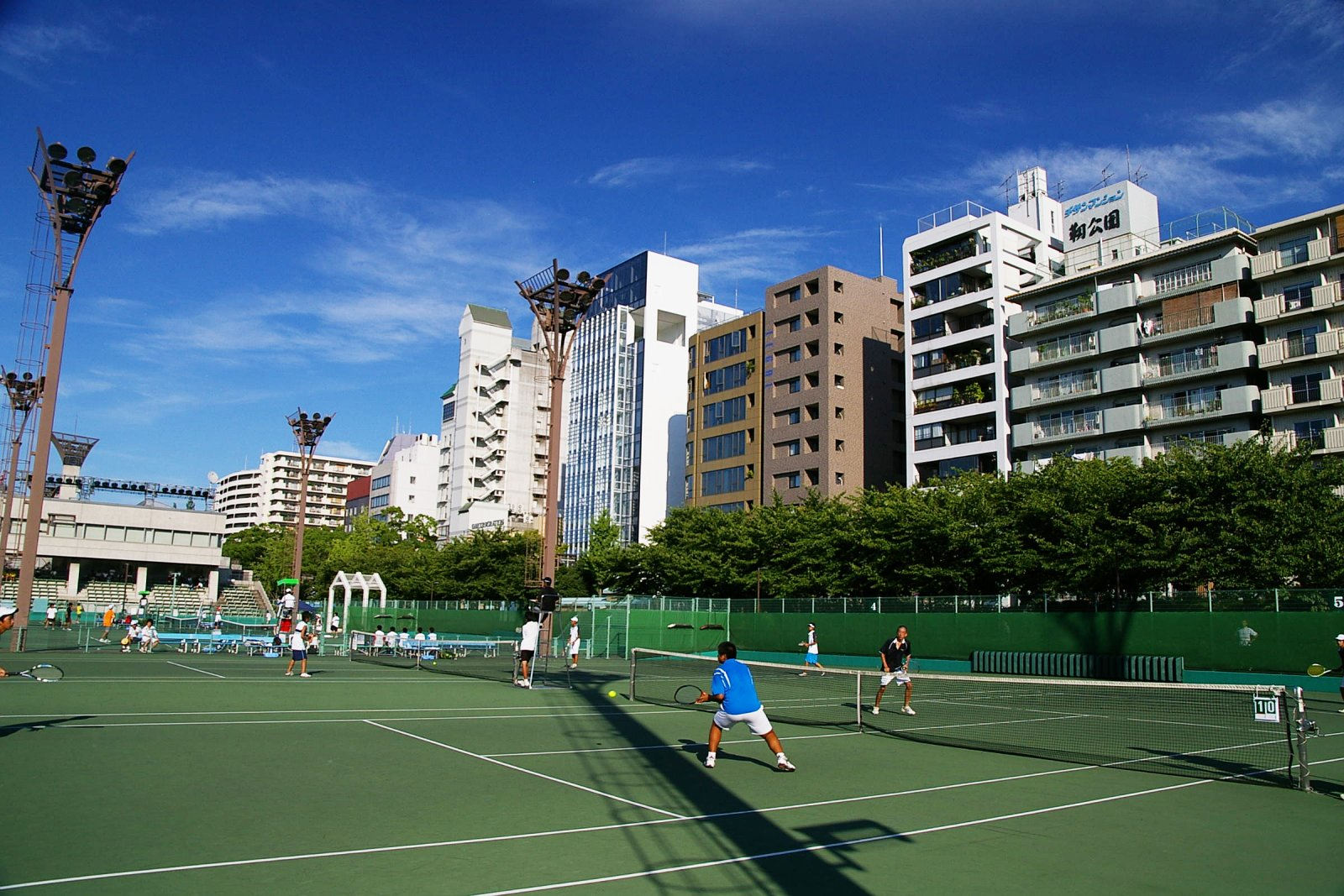
- Interactive map of Utsubo Tennis Center
- Location: Osaka, Japan
- Capacity: 5,000 (central court); 500 (Court 1)
- Surface: Hard, Outdoors

Construction
- Groundbreaking: early 1950's
- Opened: 1953
- Cost: ?
- Architect: ?

Tenants
- Osaka Mayor's Cup; HP Open

The Utsubo Tennis Center (Japanese: 靱テニスセンター) is a tennis complex situated in the Utsubo Park, Nishi-ku, Osaka, Japan. The complex was the host of the HP Open (WTA International tournaments) from 2009 through 2014. The stadium court has a capacity of 5,000 people, second court has a capacity of 500 people.
