= Leanne Baker =

New Zealand tennis player

- Country (sports): New Zealand
- Residence: Te Awamutu, New Zealand
- Born: 8 January 1981 (age 45) Hamilton, New Zealand
- Height: 1.73 m (5 ft 8 in)
- Turned pro: 1998
- Retired: 2008
- Plays: Left-handed (one-handed backhand)
- Prize money: $136,918

Singles
- Career record: 262–206
- Career titles: 7 ITF
- Highest ranking: No. 260 (26 February 2007)

Doubles
- Career record: 241–194
- Career titles: 18 ITF
- Highest ranking: No. 108 (17 January 2005)

Grand Slam doubles results
- Australian Open: 1R (2005)
- Wimbledon: 1R (2004)

Leanne Baker (born 8 January 1981) is a former New Zealand professional tennis player, and a former United States club rugby player. She is currently the head coach of the Chicago Women's Rugby Football Club.

Her tennis career-high singles ranking is world No. 260, which she reached on 26 February 2007. Her career-high doubles ranking is No. 108, set at 17 January 2005.

== WTA career finals ==
=== Doubles: 1 (0–1) ===
Legend
Grand Slam (0–0)
Tier I (0–0)
Tier II (0–0)
Tier III (0–0)
Tier IV & V (0–1)

Outcome	No.	Date	Location	Surface	Partnering	Opponents	Score
Runner-up	1.	8 January 2005	Auckland Open, New Zealand	Hard	(Italy) Francesca Lubiani	(Japan) Shinobu Asagoe (Slovenia) Katarina Srebotnik	3–6, 3–6

== ITF Circuit finals ==
$100,000 tournaments
$75,000 tournaments
$50,000 tournaments
$25,000 tournaments
$10,000 tournaments

=== Singles: 10 (7–3) ===
Outcome	No.	Date	Location	Surface	Opponent	Score
Winner	1.	2 May 1999	Coatzacoalcos, Mexico	Hard	(United States) Candice Jairala	3–6, 6–3, 7–5
Winner	2.	11 July 1999	Felixstowe, England	Grass	(Republic of Ireland) Karen Nugent	6–4, 6–4
Runner-up	1.	6 February 2000	Wellington, New Zealand	Hard	(Australia) Mireille Dittmann	6–7^{(5–7)}, 6–1, 6–7^{(5–7)}
Runner-up	2.	28 May 2000	El Paso, United States	Hard	(United States) Erin Burdette	1–6, 3–6
Runner-up	3.	14 September 2003	Spoleto, Italy	Clay	(Czech Republic) Lenka Snajdrová	4–6, 3–6
Winner	3.	6 February 2005	Wellington, New Zealand	Hard	(Australia) Mireille Dittmann	2–6, 6–1, 6–1
Winner	4.	21 August 2005	Jesi, Italy	Hard	(Germany) Vanessa Pinto	6–2, 7–6^{(8–6)}
Winner	5.	5 February 2006	Taupō, New Zealand	Hard	(Japan) Natsumi Hamamura	6–1, 6–2
Winner	6.	12 February 2006	Wellington, New Zealand	Hard	(Czech Republic) Kateřina Kramperová	6–4, 1–6, 6–0
Winner	7.	20 April 2008	Mazatlán, Mexico	Hard	(United States) Anna Lubinsky	6–2, 6–1

=== Doubles: 38 (18–20) ===
Outcome	No.	Date	Location	Surface	Partnering	Opponents	Score
Winner	1.	6 February 1999	Wellington, New Zealand	Hard	(New Zealand) Rewa Hudson	(Australia) Gail Biggs (New Zealand) Shelley Stephens	6–1, 6–1
Winner	2.	11 July 1999	Felixstowe, England	Grass	(Australia) Nicole Sewell	(United Kingdom) Victoria Davies (United Kingdom) Kate Warne-Holland	6–1, 6–4
Runner-up	1.	17 September 1999	Frinton, England	Grass	(Australia) Nicole Sewell	(South Africa) Natalie Grandin (South Africa) Nicole Rencken	2–6, 6–3, 1–6
Winner	3.	28 May 2000	El Paso, United States	Hard	(India) Manisha Malhotra	(United States) Kaysie Smashey (United States) Varalee Sureephong	6–2, 7–6
Runner-up	2.	4 June 2000	San Antonio, United States	Hard	(India) Manisha Malhotra	(Australia) Melanie Clayton (Australia) Emma Gott	6–3, 6–7^{(5–7)}, 5–7
Runner-up	3.	24 July 2000	Pamplona, Spain	Hard	(Colombia) Mariana Mesa	(Netherlands) Yvette Basting (Germany) Mia Buric	2–6, 0–6
Winner	4.	4 March 2001	Bendigo, Australia	Hard	(New Zealand) Shelley Stephens	(Netherlands) Debby Haak (Netherlands) Jolanda Mens	6–3, 6–2
Runner-up	4.	22 April 2001	Ho Chi Minh City, Vietnam	Hard	(New Zealand) Shelley Stephens	(India) Manisha Malhotra (India) Nirupama Vaidyanathan	3–6, 5–7
Winner	5.	18 June 2001	Marseille, France	Clay	(India) Manisha Malhotra	(France) Caroline Dhenin (Croatia) Maja Palaveršić	7–6^{(7–5)}, 6–2
Winner	6.	1 July 2001	Båstad, Sweden	Hard	(India) Manisha Malhotra	(Austria) Daniela Klemenschits (Austria) Sandra Klemenschits	6–3, 6–1
Runner-up	5.	30 September 2001	Raleigh, United States	Clay	(New Zealand) Tracey O'Connor	(United States) Allison Baker (Hungary) Melinda Czink	4–6, 6–1, 4–6
Runner-up	6.	21 July 2002	Valladolid, Spain	Hard	(India) Manisha Malhotra	(United Kingdom) Elena Baltacha (Madagascar) Natacha Randriantefy	2–6, 3–6
Runner-up	7.	30 March 2003	Atlanta, United States	Hard	(Italy) Francesca Lubiani	(China) Li Ting (China) Sun Tiantian	6–4, 4–6, 4–6
Winner	7.	18 May 2003	Casale Monferrato, Italy	Clay	(Belgium) Elke Clijsters	(Netherlands) Jolanda Mens (Germany) Stefanie Weis	6–1, 6–2
Winner	8.	1 June 2003	Campobasso, Italy	Clay	(Russia) Ekaterina Kozhokina	(Serbia) Ana Jovanović (Serbia) Višnja Vuletić	6–1, 6–1
Runner-up	8.	13 July 2003	Felixstowe, England	Grass	(United Kingdom) Chantal Coombs	(Republic of Ireland) Karen Nugent (Republic of Ireland) Elsa O'Riain	6–7^{(7–9)}, 6–7^{(2–7)}
Winner	9.	7 September 2003	Mestre, Italy	Clay	(Italy) Francesca Lubiani	(Australia) Monique Adamczak (New Zealand) Shelley Stephens	6–2, 4–6, 6–2
Winner	10.	14 September 2003	Spoleto, Italy	Clay	(New Zealand) Shelley Stephens	(Netherlands) Kika Hogendoorn (Austria) Bettina Pirker	6–3, 3–6, 7–5
Runner-up	9.	28 September 2003	Glasgow, Scotland	Hard	(Italy) Francesca Lubiani	(Netherlands) Kim Kilsdonk (Australia) Nicole Kriz	5–7, 2–6
Runner-up	10.	8 February 2004	Rockford, United States	Hard (i)	(Italy) Francesca Lubiani	(Argentina) Mariana Díaz Oliva (Argentina) Gisela Dulko	7–6^{(7–5)}, 3–6, 1–6
Runner-up	11.	22 February 2004	Columbus, United States	Hard (i)	(Italy) Francesca Lubiani	(Slovakia) Stanislava Hrozenská (Czech Republic) Lenka Němečková	6–7^{(3–7)}, 6–4, 3–6
Winner	11.	28 February 2004	St. Paul, United States	Hard (i)	(Italy) Francesca Lubiani	(United States) Jessica Lehnhoff (Australia) Trudi Musgrave	6–7^{(3–7)}, 2–3 ret.
Winner	12.	6 June 2004	Surbiton, England	Grass	(Australia) Nicole Sewell	(South Africa) Surina De Beer (Republic of Ireland) Karen Nugent	2–6, 7–5, 7–6^{(8–6)}
Winner	13.	5 October 2004	Glasgow, Scotland	Hard (i)	(Italy) Francesca Lubiani	(Republic of Ireland) Claire Curran (Turkey) İpek Şenoğlu	6–3, 5–7, 6–4
Runner-up	12.	20 March 2005	Orange, United States	Hard	(Italy) Francesca Lubiani	(United States) Carly Gullickson (United States) Jennifer Hopkins	3–6, 4–6
Runner-up	13.	27 March 2005	Redding, United States	Hard	(Italy) Francesca Lubiani	(Ukraine) Yuliya Beygelzimer (Canada) Stéphanie Dubois	4–6, 7–6^{(7–1)}, 3–6
Winner	14.	9 July 2005	Felixstowe, England	Grass	(Italy) Francesca Lubiani	(Australia) Jarmila Gajdošová (Russia) Alla Kudryavtseva	6–1, 4–6, 3–2 ret.
Runner-up	14.	21 August 2005	Jesi, Italy	Hard	(Italy) Francesca Lubiani	(Italy) Silvia Disderi (Italy) Giulia Gabba	2–6, 6–2, 4–6
Winner	15.	28 August 2005	Trecastagni, Italy	Hard	(Italy) Francesca Lubiani	(Russia) Regina Kulikova (Russia) Marina Shamayko	6–2, 4–6, 6–3
Runner-up	15.	5 February 2006	Taupō, New Zealand	Hard	(Italy) Francescz Lubiani	(United States) Lauren Barnikow (United States) Christina Fusano	4–6, 4–6
Runner-up	16.	12 February 2006	Wellington, New Zealand	Hard	(New Zealand) Ellen Barry	(New Zealand) Paula Marama (New Zealand) Kairangi Vano	3–6, 1–6
Runner-up	17.	17 March 2006	Canberra, Australia	Clay	(Australia) Nicole Kriz	(Australia) Monique Adamczak (Australia) Christina Horiatopoulos	6–7^{(4–7)}, 1–6
Runner-up	18.	14 May 2006	Fukuoka, Japan	Grass	(Australia) Christina Horiatopoulos	(Chinese Taipei) Chan Yung-jan (Chinese Taipei) Chuang Chia-jung	1–6, 2–6
Winner	16.	8 October 2006	Troy, United States	Hard	(Australia) Nicole Kriz	(South Africa) Chanelle Scheepers (United States) Neha Uberoi	6–7^{(1–7)}, 7–6, 6–3
Winner	17.	29 October 2006	Augusta, United States	Hard	(Australia) Nicole Kriz	(South Africa) Chanelle Scheepers (United States) Neha Uberoi	7–6^{(7–3)}, 6–1
Winner	18.	19 November 2006	Lawrenceville, United States	Hard	(United States) Julie Ditty	(United States) Christina Fusano (United States) Aleke Tsoubanos	7–6^{(7–5)}, 6–4
Runner-up	19.	4 May 2007	Catania, Italy	Clay	(Australia) Nicole Kriz	(Belgium) Debbrich Feys (Belarus) Darya Kustova	4–6, 4–6
Runner-up	20.	21 October 2007	Lawrenceville, United States	Hard	(United States) Julie Ditty	(Canada) Stéphanie Dubois (Russia) Alisa Kleybanova	2–6, 0–6
