= 2000 Fed Cup =

International women's tennis competition

Details
- Duration: 28 March – 25 November
- Edition: 38th

Achievements (singles)

The 2000 Fed Cup was the 38th edition of the most important competition between national teams in women's tennis.

Changes were made to the World Group; instead of two groups of eight teams, there was one group of thirteen. The group was divided into three round-robin pools of four, with the winner of each pool joining defending champions the United States in a knockout bracket. In the final, the United States defeated Spain at the Mandalay Bay Events Center in Las Vegas, Nevada, United States, on 24–25 November, giving the United States their 17th title.

== World Group ==
- Nations in **bold** advanced to the higher level of competition.

Pool A

1. **Spain**
2. Italy
3. Germany
4. Croatia

Pool B

1. **Czech Republic**
2. Switzerland
3. Austria
4. Slovakia

Pool C

1. **Belgium**
2. France
3. Russia
4. Australia

=== Draw ===
**Semifinals**; 21–22 November
1	**United States**	**2**
Belgium	1
Czech Republic	1
2	**Spain**	**2**

**Final**; 24–25 November
1	**United States**	**5**
2	Spain	0

== Americas Zone ==
- Nations in **bold** advanced to the higher level of competition.
- Nations in italics were relegated down to a lower level of competition.

=== Group I ===
Venue: Santinho Coast, Florianópolis, Brazil (outdoor clay)

Dates: 25–30 April

Participating teams

- **Argentina**
- Brazil
- Canada
- Chile
- Colombia
- Cuba
- Mexico
- Paraguay
- Uruguay
- Venezuela

=== Group II ===
Venue: Maya C.C., La Libertad, El Salvador (outdoor clay)

Dates: 9–13 May

Participating teams

- Antigua and Barbuda
- Bahamas
- Barbados
- Bermuda
- Bolivia
- Costa Rica
- **Dominican Republic**
- **Ecuador**
- El Salvador
- Guatemala
- Jamaica
- Panama
- Puerto Rico
- Trinidad and Tobago

== Asia/Oceania Zone ==
- Nations in **bold** advanced to the higher level of competition.
- Nations in italics were relegated down to a lower level of competition.

=== Group I ===
Venue: Utsubo Tennis Center, Osaka, Japan (outdoor hard)

Dates: 25–30 April

Participating teams

- China
- Chinese Taipei
- Hong Kong
- India
- Indonesia
- **Japan**
- Kazakhstan
- New Zealand
- Singapore
- South Korea
- Thailand

=== Group II ===
Venue: Utsubo Tennis Center, Osaka, Japan (outdoor hard)

Dates: 25–29 April

Participating teams

- Fiji
- Iraq
- Jordan
- Malaysia
- **Pacific Oceania**
- Pakistan
- Philippines
- Sri Lanka
- Syria
- Tajikistan
- **Uzbekistan**

== Europe/Africa Zone ==
- Nations in **bold** advanced to the higher level of competition.
- Nations in italics were relegated down to a lower level of competition.

=== Group I ===
Venue: La Manga Club, Murcia, Spain (outdoor clay)

Dates: 15–20 May

Participating teams

- Belarus
- Bulgaria
- Finland
- Great Britain
- Greece
- **Hungary**
- Israel
- Latvia
- Luxembourg
- Morocco
- Netherlands
- Poland
- Romania
- Slovenia
- South Africa
- Sweden
- Turkey
- Ukraine

=== Group II ===
Venue: Estoril T.C., Estoril, Portugal (outdoor clay)

Dates: 28 March – 1 April

Participating teams

- Algeria
- Armenia
- Bosnia and Herzegovina
- Botswana
- Cyprus
- **Denmark**
- Egypt
- **Estonia**
- Georgia
- Iceland
- Ireland
- Kenya
- Lesotho
- Liechtenstein
- Lithuania
- **Macedonia**
- Madagascar
- Malta
- Mauritius
- Moldova
- Portugal
- Tunisia
- **Yugoslavia**
