= Shelley Stephens =

New Zealand tennis player

- Country (sports): New Zealand
- Born: 29 July 1978 (age 47); Ōtāhuhu, New Zealand
- Turned pro: 1995
- Retired: 2009
- Plays: Right (two-handed backhand)
- Prize money: $97,801

Singles
- Career record: 193–202
- Career titles: 2 ITF
- Highest ranking: No. 249 (11 June 2001)

Doubles
- Career record: 222–160
- Career titles: 21 ITF
- Highest ranking: No. 133 (4 March 2002)

Grand Slam doubles results
- Australian Open: 1R (2002)

Team competitions
- Fed Cup: 14–22

Shelley Stephens (born 29 July 1978) is a New Zealand former professional tennis player.

She won two singles and 21 doubles titles on the ITF Circuit in her career. On 11 June 2001, she reached her best singles ranking of world No. 249. On 4 March 2002, she peaked at No. 133 in the doubles rankings.

Playing for New Zealand at the Fed Cup, Stephens has a win–loss record of 14–22. She made her WTA Tour main-draw debut at the 2001 ASB Classic in the doubles event, partnering with María Emilia Salerni.

Stephens retired from professional tennis 2009.

== ITF Circuit finals ==
$25,000 tournaments
$10,000 tournaments

=== Singles: 10 (2–8) ===
| Result | Date | Tournament | Surface | Opponent | Score |
|---|---|---|---|---|---|
| Loss | 2 August 1999 | ITF Toruń, Poland | Clay | (Czech Republic) Petra Kučová | 2–6, 4–6 |
| Loss | 25 October 1999 | ITF Kastoria, Greece | Carpet (i) | (Federal Republic of Yugoslavia) Dragana Ilić | 4–6, 4–6 |
| Loss | 5 June 2000 | ITF Vaduz, Liechtenstein | Clay | (Czech Republic) Zuzana Hejdová | 7–6^{(4)}, 2–6, 2–6 |
| Loss | 4 February 2001 | ITF Wellington, New Zealand | Hard | (Chinese Taipei) Hsieh Su-wei | 2–6, 4–6 |
| Loss | 24 June 2002 | ITF Thessaloniki, Greece | Clay | (Greece) Christina Zachariadou | 4–6, 6–3, 4–6 |
| Loss | 26 August 2002 | ITF Spoleto, Italy | Clay | (Croatia) Jelena Pandžić | 5–7, 2–6 |
| Loss | 7 October 2002 | ITF Catania, Italy | Clay | (Germany) Sabrina Jolk | 3–6, 1–6 |
| Loss | 14 October 2002 | ITF Benevento, Italy | Carpet | (Germany) Sabrina Jolk | 4–6, 1–6 |
| Win | 27 June 2004 | ITF Tlemcen, Algeria | Clay | (France) Joanne Akl | 6–4, 6–1 |
| Win | 5 July 2004 | ITF Sidi Fredj, Algeria | Clay | (France) Joanne Akl | 6–1, 6–3 |

=== Doubles: 35 (21–14) ===
| Result | Date | Tournament | Surface | Partner | Opponents | Score |
|---|---|---|---|---|---|---|
| Win | 2 February 1998 | ITF Wellington, New Zealand | Hard | (Australia) Kym Hazzard | (Singapore) Leong Jil-Lin (Indonesia) Wynne Prakusya | 6–1, 1–6, 7–6^{(4)} |
| Loss | 2 March 1998 | ITF Warrnambool, Australia | Grass | (Australia) Gail Biggs | (Australia) Lisa McShea (Australia) Alicia Molik | 3–6, 1–6 |
| Loss | 27 July 1998 | ITF Catania, Italy | Clay | (Austria) Sandra Mantler | (Italy) Alberta Brianti (Italy) Chiara Dalbon | 3–6, 4–6 |
| Loss | 12 October 1998 | ITF Kooralbyn, Australia | Hard | (Australia) Gail Biggs | (Australia) Lisa McShea (Australia) Trudi Musgrave | 3–6, 6–7^{(5)} |
| Loss | 1 February 1999 | ITF Wellington, New Zealand | Hard | (Australia) Gail Biggs | (New Zealand) Leanne Baker (New Zealand) Rewa Hudson | 1–6, 1–6 |
| Win | 25 April 1999 | Hvar, Croatia | Clay | (New Zealand) Rewa Hudson | (Ukraine) Valeria Bondarenko (Ukraine) Alona Bondarenko | 6–2, 4–6, 6–3 |
| Loss | 12 July 1999 | Sezze, Italy | Hard | (Germany) Eva Belbl | (Denmark) Charlotte Aagaard (Georgia (country)) Nino Louarsabishvili | 2–6, 2–6 |
| Loss | 16 August 1999 | Koksijde, Belgium | Clay | (New Zealand) Rewa Hudson | (China) Li Ting (China) Li Na | 3–6, 2–6 |
| Win | 30 August 1999 | Bad Saulgau, Germany | Clay | (New Zealand) Rewa Hudson | (Germany) Caroline Raba (Germany) Julia Schruff | 6–7^{(7)}, 6–3, 6–0 |
| Win | 25 October 1999 | Kastoria, Greece | Carpet (i) | (Republic of Ireland) Karen Nugent | (Greece) Asimina Kaplani (Greece) Anna Koumantou | 6–2, 6–2 |
| Win | 14 February 2000 | Faro, Portugal | Hard | (Netherlands) Natasha Galouza | (Bulgaria) Maria Geznenge (Bulgaria) Antoaneta Pandjerova | 7–6^{(5)}, 6–3 |
| Win | 27 March 2000 | Kalamata, Greece | Carpet | (New Zealand) Rewa Hudson | (Romania) Adriana Burz (Croatia) Lana Miholček | 6–1, 6–0 |
| Win | 5 June 2000 | Vaduz, Liechtenstein | Clay | (New Zealand) Rewa Hudson | (Czech Republic) Zuzana Hejdová (Czech Republic) Jana Macurová | 6–2, 2–6, 6–2 |
| Loss | 17 July 2000 | Brussels, Belgium | Clay | (Argentina) Geraldine Aizenberg | (Slovakia) Silvia Uríčková (Czech Republic) Magdalena Zděnovcová | 6–7^{(6)}, 6–3, 1–6 |
| Loss | 11 September 2000 | Sofia, Bulgaria | Clay | (Netherlands) Natasha Galouza | (Bulgaria) Antoaneta Pandjerova (Bulgaria) Desislava Topalova | 1–6, 6–7^{(4)} |
| Win | 9 October 2000 | Welwyn, United Kingdom | Hard (i) | (Serbia and Montenegro) Dragana Zarić | (Italy) Antonella Serra Zanetti (Italy) Adriana Serra Zanetti | 4–0, 5–3, 4–1 |
| Win | 6 November 2000 | Villenave-d'Ornon, France | Clay | (Belgium) Caroline Maes | (France) Diana Brunel (France) Edith Nunes-Bersot | 4–1, 1–4, 4–2, 4–0 |
| Win | 29 January 2001 | Wellington, New Zealand | Hard | (Australia) Donna Mc Intyre | (Chinese Taipei) Hsieh Su-wei (Germany) Annette Kolb | 7–5, 0–6, 6–2 |
| Win | 4 March 2001 | Bendigo International, Australia | Hard | (New Zealand) Leanne Baker | (Netherlands) Debby Haak (Netherlands) Jolanda Mens | 6–3, 6–2 |
| Loss | 22 April 2001 | Ho Chi Minh City, Vietnam | Hard | (New Zealand) Leanne Baker | (India) Manisha Malhotra (India) Nirupama Sanjeev | 3–6, 5–7 |
| Win | 21 October 2001 | Saint-Raphaël, France | Hard (i) | (France) Caroline Dhenin | (France) Anne-Laure Heitz (France) Élodie Le Bescond | 6–0, 7–5 |
| Loss | 5 August 2002 | Ladies Open Hechingen, Germany | Clay | (Germany) Lydia Steinbach | (Germany) Andrea Glass (Germany) Jasmin Wöhr | 4–6, 5–7 |
| Win | 7 October 2002 | Catania, Italy | Clay | (France) Kildine Chevalier | (Austria) Susanne Filipp (Portugal) Neuza Silva | 6–2, 6–2 |
| Loss | 1 December 2002 | Mumbai, India | Hard | (Germany) Scarlett Werner | (Israel) Tzipora Obziler (Serbia and Montenegro) Katarina Mišić | 3–6, 6–4, 5–7 |
| Win | 21 July 2003 | Horb, Germany | Clay | (Russia) Maria Kondratieva | (Belgium) Leslie Butkiewicz (Netherlands) Kim Kilsdonk | 6–3, 3–6, 6–3 |
| Loss | 7 September 2003 | Save Cup, Italy | Clay | (Australia) Monique Adamczak | (New Zealand) Leanne Baker (Italy) Francesca Lubiani | 2–6, 6–4, 2–6 |
| Win | 14 September 2003 | ITF Spoleto, Italy | Clay | (New Zealand) Leanne Baker | (Netherlands) Kika Hogendoorn (Austria) Bettina Pirker | 6–3, 3–6, 7–5 |
| Win | 6 October 2003 | ITF Bari, Italy | Clay | (Austria) Betina Pirker | (Italy) Giulia Meruzzi (France) Aurélie Védy | 6–2, 6–2 |
| Win | 3 February 2004 | ITF Wellington, New Zealand | Hard | (Australia) Kristen van Elden | (Australia) Emily Hewson (Australia) Nicole Kriz | 6–1, 3–6, 6–3 |
| Win | 27 June 2004 | ITF Tlemcen, Algeria | Clay | (France) Joanne Akl | (Norway) Karoline Borgersen (Austria) Anna-Maria Miller | 6–1, 6–0 |
| Win | 5 July 2004 | ITF Sidi Fredj, Algeria | Clay | (India) Sai Jayalakshmy Jayaram | (United States) Jennifer Elie (Sweden) Michaela Johansson | 6–3, 6–1 |
| Loss | 19 July 2004 | ITF Zwevegem, Belgium | Clay | (Belgium) Leslie Butkiewicz | (Czech Republic) Zuzana Černá (Canada) Aneta Soukup | 3–6, 2–6 |
| Win | 9 August 2004 | ITF Koksijde, Belgium | Clay | (Belgium) Leslie Butkiewicz | (Belgium) Jessie de Vries (Belgium) Debbrich Feys | 6–2, 7–5 |
| Win | 9 October 2004 | Lagos Open, Nigeria | Hard | (India) Sania Mirza | (South Africa) Surina De Beer (South Africa) Chanelle Scheepers | 6–1, 6–4 |
| Loss | 16 October 2004 | Lagos Open, Nigeria | Hard | (India) Sania Mirza | (South Africa) Surina De Beer (South Africa) Chanelle Scheepers | 0–6, 0–6 |
