= 1998 Fed Cup Asia/Oceania Zone =

Subsection of tennis competition

The Asia/Oceania Zone was one of three zones of regional competition in the 1998 Fed Cup.

== Group I ==
- Venue: Thana City Golf Club, Samutpakarn, Thailand (outdoor hard)
- Date: 16–20 February

The nine teams were first randomly divided into three pools of three teams to compete in round-robin competitions. The nine teams were then divided into three new pools based on their placing in their first pools, which would be used to determine each team's overall placing in the zonal group. The team that finished first overall would be promoted to the World Group II Play-offs, while the team that finished ninth would be relegated to Group II for 1999.

=== Initial Pools ===
	Initial Pool A	TPE	INA	UZB
1	Chinese Taipei (2–0)		2–1	3–0
2	Indonesia (1–1)	1–2		3–0
3	Uzbekistan (0–2)	0–3	0–3	

	Initial Pool B	KOR	CHN	HKG
1	South Korea (2–0)		3–0	3–0
2	China (1–1)	0–3		2–1
3	Hong Kong (0–2)	0–3	1–2	

	Initial Pool C	NZL	THA	PHI
1	New Zealand (2–0)		2–1	3–0
2	Thailand (1–1)	1–2		3–0
3	Philippines (0–2)	0–3	0–3	

=== Placement Pools ===
	Placement Pool A	KOR	TPE	NZL
1	South Korea (2–0)		2–1	2–0
2	Chinese Taipei (1–1)	1–2		2–1
3	New Zealand (0–2)	0–2	1–2	

	Placement Pool B	CHN	THA	INA
1	China (2–0)		2–1	2–1
2	Thailand (1–1)	1–2		2–1
3	Indonesia (0–2)	1–2	1–2	

	Placement Pool C	HKG	UZB	PHI
1	Hong Kong (2–0)		2–1	3–0
2	Uzbekistan (1–1)	1–2		2–1
3	Philippines (0–2)	0–3	1–2	

- South Korea advanced to World Group II Play-offs.
- Philippines relegated to Group II in 1999.

== Group II ==
- Venue: Thana City Golf Club, Samutpakarn, Thailand (outdoor hard)
- Date: 16–21 February

The nine teams were first randomly divided into three pools of three teams to compete in round-robin competitions. The nine teams were then divided into three new pools based on their placing in their first pools, which would be used to determine each team's overall placing in the zonal group. The teams that finished first and second overall would be promoted to Group I for 1999.

=== Initial Pools ===
	Initial Pool A	IND	PAK	IRQ
1	India (2–0)		3–0	3–0
2	Pakistan (1–1)	0–3		3–0
3	Iraq (0–2)	0–3	0–3	

	Initial Pool B	POC	MAS	SIN
1	Pacific Oceania (2–0)		2–1	2–1
2	Malaysia (1–1)	1–2		3–0
3	Singapore (0–2)	1–2	0–3	

	Initial Pool C	TJK	KAZ	SYR
1	Tajikistan (2–0)		2–1	3–0
2	Kazakhstan (1–1)	1–2		3–0
3	Syria (0–2)	0–3	0–3	

=== Placement Pools ===
	Placement Pool A	IND	POC	TJK
1	India (2–0)		2–0	2–1
2	Pacific Oceania (1–1)	0–2		2–0
3	Tajikistan (0–2)	1–2	0–2	

	Placement Pool B	MAS	KAZ	PAK
1	Malaysia (2–0)		2–0	3–0
2	Kazakhstan (1–1)	0–2		2–0
3	Pakistan (0–2)	0–3	0–2	

	Placement Pool C	SIN	SYR	IRQ
1	Singapore (2–0)		2–1	3–0
2	Syria (1–1)	1–2		2–0
3	Iraq (0–2)	0–3	0–2	

- India and Pacific Oceania advanced to Group I in 1999.

== See also ==
- Fed Cup structure
