= 1998 Fed Cup Americas Zone =

Subsection of tennis competition

The Americas Zone was one of three zones of regional competition in the 1998 Fed Cup.

== Group I ==
- Venue: Tennis Academy, Brasília, Brazil (outdoor clay)
- Date: 14–17 April

The nine teams were first randomly divided into three pools of three teams to compete in round-robin competitions. The nine teams were then divided into three new pools based on their placing in their first pools, which would be used to determine each team's overall placing in the zonal group. The team that finished first overall would be promoted to the World Group II Play-offs, while the teams that finished eighth and ninth would be relegated to Group II for 1999.

=== Initial Pools ===
	Initial Pool A	PAR	CAN	URU
1	Paraguay (2–0)		2–1	2–1
2	Canada (1–1)	1–2		3–0
3	Uruguay (0–2)	1–2	0–3	

	Initial Pool B	COL	BRA	CHI
1	Colombia (2–0)		2–1	2–1
2	Brazil (1–1)	1–2		2–1
3	Chile (0–2)	1–2	1–2	

	Initial Pool C	VEN	ECU	PER
1	Venezuela (2–0)		3–0	2–1
2	Ecuador (1–1)	0–3		2–1
3	Peru (0–2)	1–2	1–2	

=== Placement Pools ===
	Placement Pool A	VEN	PAR	COL
1	Venezuela (2–0)		2–1	2–1
2	Paraguay (1–1)	1–2		3–0
3	Colombia (0–2)	1–2	0–3	

	Placement Pool B	CAN	BRA	ECU
1	Canada (2–0)		3–0	3–0
2	Brazil (1–1)	0–3		2–0
3	Ecuador (0–2)	0–3	0–2	

	Placement Pool C	CHI	URU	PER
1	Chile (2–0)		3–0	2–0
2	Uruguay (1–1)	0–3		2–1
3	Peru (0–2)	0–2	1–2	

- Venezuela advanced to World Group II Play-offs.
- Uruguay and Peru relegated to Group II in 1999.

== Group II ==
- Venue: Chipinque Racquet Club, Monterrey, Mexico (outdoor hard)
- Date: 27 April – 3 May

The sixteen teams were divided into two pools of eight. The top team from each pool then moved would advance to Group I for 1999.

=== Pools ===
	Pool A	MEX	ESA	HAI	GUA	CRC	BAR	BER	ATG
1	Mexico (7–0)		3–0	3–0	3–0	3–0	3–0	3–0	3–0
2	El Salvador (6–1)	0–3		3–0	2–1	3–0	3–0	3–0	3–0
3	Haiti (4–3)	0–3	0–3		3–0	1–2	2–1	3–0	3–0
4	Guatemala (4–3)	0–3	1–2	0–3		2–1	3–0	2–1	3–0
5	Costa Rica (4–3)	0–3	0–3	2–1	1–2		3–0	3–0	3–0
6	Barbados (2–5)	0–3	0–3	1–2	0–3	0–3		2–1	3–0
7	Bermuda (1–6)	0–3	0–3	0–3	1–2	0–3	1–2		2–1
8	Antigua and Barbuda (0–7)	0–3	0–3	0–3	0–3	0–3	0–3	1–2	

	Pool B	PUR	CUB	DOM	TRI	PAN	BOL	JAM	BAH
1	Puerto Rico (7–0)		2–1	2–1	3–0	2–1	3–0	3–0	3–0
2	Cuba (6–1)	1–2		2–1	3–0	3–0	3–0	3–0	3–0
3	Dominican Republic (5–2)	1–2	1–2		2–1	2–1	2–1	3–0	2–1
4	Trinidad and Tobago (4–3)	0–3	0–3	1–2		2–1	2–1	2–1	3–0
5	Panama (3–4)	1–2	0–3	1–2	1–2		2–1	3–0	2–1
6	Bolivia (1–6)	0–3	0–3	1–2	1–2	1–2		2–1	1–2
7	Jamaica (1–6)	0–3	0–3	0–3	1–2	0–3	1–2		3–0
8	Bahamas (1–6)	0–3	0–3	1–2	0–3	1–2	2–1	0–3	

- Mexico and Puerto Rico advanced to Group I in 1999.

== See also ==
- Fed Cup structure
