= 1998 Fed Cup Asia/Oceania Zone Group II – Initial Pool A =

Initial Group A of the 1998 Fed Cup Asia/Oceania Zone Group II was one of six pools in the Asia/Oceania Zone Group II of the 1998 Fed Cup. Three teams competed in a round robin competition with the team coming first advancing to Placement Pool A, the team coming second going to Placement Pool B, and the team coming last falling to Placement Pool C.

	(India) IND	(Pakistan) PAK	(Iraq) IRQ	RR; W–L	Set; W–L	Game; W–L	Standings
India		3–0	3–0	2–0	12–1	78–12	1
Pakistan	0–3		3–0	1–1	7–6	48–55	2
Iraq	0–3	0–3		0–2	0–12	13–72	3

== India vs. Pakistan ==
India
3
Thana City Golf Club, Samutpakarn, Thailand
16 February 1998
Hard (outdoors)

Pakistan
0

			1	2	3
1	(India) (Pakistan)	Uzma Khan; Haleema Rahim	6; 1	6; 1
2	(India) (Pakistan)	Nirupama Vaidyanathan; Nida Waseem	6; 0	6; 1
3	(India) (Pakistan)	Rushmi Chakravarthi / Arati Ponnappa; Haleema Rahim / Nida Waseem	6; 1	6^{5} 7^{7}	6; 1

== India vs. Iraq ==
India
3
Thana City Golf Club, Samutpakarn, Thailand
17 February 1998
Hard (outdoors)

Iraq
0

			1	2	3
1	(India) (Iraq)	Uzma Khan; Mina Abdul-Rahman	6; 0	6; 0
2	(India) (Iraq)	Nirupama Vaidyanathan; Ishraq Salman	6; 0	6; 0
3	(India) (Iraq)	Rushmi Chakravarthi / Arati Ponnappa; Mina Abdul-Rahman / Ishraq Salman	6; 0	6; 0

== Pakistan vs. Iraq ==
Pakistan
3
Thana City Golf Club, Samutpakarn, Thailand
18 February 1998
Hard (outdoors)

Iraq
0

			1	2	3
1	(Pakistan) (Iraq)	Haleema Rahim; Mina Abdul-Rahman	6; 3	6; 3
2	(Pakistan) (Iraq)	Nida Waseem; Ishraq Salman	6; 2	6; 1
3	(Pakistan) (Iraq)	Mariam Rahim / Nida Waseem; Mina Abdul-Rahman / Ishraq Salman	6; 2	6; 2

== See also ==
- Fed Cup structure
