= 1997 Fed Cup Asia/Oceania Zone Group II – play-offs =

International tennis competition play-offs

The play-offs of the 1997 Fed Cup Asia/Oceania Zone Group II were the final stages of the Group II Zonal Competition involving teams from Asia and Oceania. Using the positions determined in their pools, the eight teams faced off to determine their overall placing in the 1997 Fed Cup Asia/Oceania Zone Group II. The top two teams advanced to Group I for 1998.

Placing	Pool A	Pool B
1	Uzbekistan	Philippines
2	Malaysia	Pacific Oceania
3	Singapore	Syria
4	Sri Lanka	Pakistan

== Draw ==
Second Round; 15 March
Pacific Oceania	1
Malaysia	2

First Round; 14 March
Uzbekistan	2
Pacific Oceania	1
Malaysia	1
Philippines	2

Play-offs
Pakistan	2
Sri Lanka	1

First round
Singapore	3
Pakistan	0
Sri Lanka	1
Syria	2

Second round
Singapore	3
Syria	0

=== First round ===
==== Pacific Oceania vs. Uzbekistan ====
Pacific Oceania
1
Renouf Centre, Wellington, New Zealand
14 March 1997
Plexipave hard (outdoors)

Uzbekistan
2

			1	2	3
1	(Pacific Oceania) (Uzbekistan)	Adriana Thaggard; Irina Yarikova	0; 6	3; 6
2	(Pacific Oceania) (Uzbekistan)	Tagifano So'Onalole; Natalia Nikitina	3; 6	7^{7} 6^{3}	6; 1
3	(Pacific Oceania) (Uzbekistan)	Tagifano So'Onalole / Adriana Thaggard; Natalia Nikitina / Irina Yarikova	4; 6	5; 7

==== Malaysia vs. Philippines ====
Malaysia
1
Renouf Centre, Wellington, New Zealand
14 March 1997
Plexipave hard (outdoors)

Philippines
2

			1	2	3
1	(Malaysia) (Philippines)	Tan Lynn-Yin; Jennifer Saret	5; 7	2; 6
2	(Malaysia) (Philippines)	Khoo Chin-bee; Marisue Jacutin	1; 6	6; 4	4; 6
3	(Malaysia) (Philippines)	Liew Sheau-Shan / Tan Lynn-Yin; Pamela Floro / Jennifer Saret	6^{6} 7^{8}	6; 2	6; 3

==== Singapore vs. Pakistan ====
Singapore
3
Renouf Centre, Wellington, New Zealand
14 March 1997
Plexipave hard (outdoors)

Pakistan
0

			1	2	3
1	(Singapore) (Pakistan)	Leong Jil-Lin; Mehvish Chishtie	6; 3	6; 1
2	(Singapore) (Pakistan)	Wong Rui-Jing; Nida Waseem	6; 1	6; 1
3	(Singapore) (Pakistan)	Chew I-Jin / Leong Jil-Lin; Mehvish Chishtie / Nida Waseem	7; 5	2; 6	6; 2

==== Sri Lanka vs. Syria ====
Sri Lanka
1
Renouf Centre, Wellington, New Zealand
14 March 1997
Plexipave hard (outdoors)

Syria
2

			1	2	3
1	(Sri Lanka) (Syria)	Anushka Rajiyah; Farah Dayoub	6; 3	6; 3
2	(Sri Lanka) (Syria)	Sobhini Wickramahewa; Sara Taweel	4; 6	4; 6
3	(Sri Lanka) (Syria)	Shalini Perera / Sobhini Wickramahewa; Farah Dayoub / Sara Taweel	5; 7	3; 6

=== Repechage Round ===
==== Pacific Oceania vs. Malaysia ====
Pacific Oceania
1
Renouf Centre, Wellington, New Zealand
15 March 1997
Plexipave hard (outdoors)

Malaysia
2

			1	2	3
1	(Pacific Oceania) (Malaysia)	Adriana Thaggard; Liew Sheau-Shan	3; 6	2; 6
2	(Pacific Oceania) (Malaysia)	Tagifano So'Onalole; Khoo Chin-bee	6; 3	3; 6	6; 3
3	(Pacific Oceania) (Malaysia)	Tagifano So'Onalole / Vera Tere; Khoo Chin-bee / Tan Lynn-Yin	4; 6	2; 6

==== Pakistan vs. Sri Lanka ====
Pakistan
2
Renouf Centre, Wellington, New Zealand
15 March 1997
Plexipave hard (outdoors)

Sri Lanka
1

			1	2	3
1	(Pakistan) (Sri Lanka)	Mehvish Chishtie; Shalini Perera	7; 5	6; 4
2	(Pakistan) (Sri Lanka)	Nida Waseem; Sobhini Wickramahewa	4; 6	4; 6
3	(Pakistan) (Sri Lanka)	Mehvish Chishtie / Nida Waseem; Shalini Perera / Sobhini Wickramahewa	6; 3	6; 2

=== Second round ===
==== Singapore vs. Syria ====
Singapore
3
Renouf Centre, Wellington, New Zealand
15 March 1997
Plexipave hard (outdoors)

Syria
0

			1	2	3
1	(Singapore) (Syria)	Leong Jil-Lin; Farah Dayoub	6; 2	6; 4
2	(Singapore) (Syria)	Wong Rui-Jing; Sara Taweel	6; 2	6; 3
3	(Singapore) (Syria)	Chew I-Jin / Wong Rui-Jing; Farah Dayoub / Shaza Tinawi	6; 1	6; 0

== Final Placements ==
Placing	Teams
Promoted	Uzbekistan
Promoted	Philippines
Third	Malaysia
Fourth	Pacific Oceania
Fifth	Singapore
Sixth	Syria
Seventh	Pakistan
Eighth	Sri Lanka

- Uzbekistan and Philippines advanced to Group I for 1998. They placed eighth and ninth overall respectively, and thus Philippines was demoted back to Group II for 1999.

== See also ==
- Fed Cup structure
