= 1998 Fed Cup Asia/Oceania Zone Group I – Initial Pool A =

Tennis tournament group

Initial Group A of the 1998 Fed Cup Asia/Oceania Zone Group I was one of six pools in the Asia/Oceania Zone Group I of the 1998 Fed Cup. Three teams competed in a round robin competition with the team coming first advancing to Placement Pool A, the team coming second going to Placement Pool B, and the team coming last falling to Placement Pool C.

	(Chinese Taipei) TPE	(Indonesia) INA	(Uzbekistan) UZB	RR; W–L	Set; W–L	Game; W–L	Standings
Chinese Taipei		2–1	3–0	2–0	11–1	73–32	1
Indonesia	1–2		3–0	1–1	6–6	61–53	2
Uzbekistan	0–3	0–3		0–2	1–11	25–73	3

== Chinese Taipei vs. Indonesia ==
Chinese Taipei
2
Thana City Golf Club, Samutpakarn, Thailand
16 February 1998
Hard (outdoors)

Indonesia
1

			1	2	3
1	(Chinese Taipei) (Indonesia)	Janet Lee; Wukirasih Sawondari	6; 3	6; 3
2	(Chinese Taipei) (Indonesia)	Wang Shi-ting; Wynne Prakusya	6; 3	6; 2
3	(Chinese Taipei) (Indonesia)	Julie Huang / Weng Tzu-ting; Wukirasih Sawondari / Eny Sulistyowati	6; 4	6^{1} 7^{7}	1; 2	retired

== Chinese Taipei vs. Uzbekistan ==
Chinese Taipei
3
Thana City Golf Club, Samutpakarn, Thailand
17 February 1998
Hard (outdoors)

Uzbekistan
0

			1	2	3
1	(Chinese Taipei) (Uzbekistan)	Janet Lee; Iroda Tulyaganova	6; 4	6; 1
2	(Chinese Taipei) (Uzbekistan)	Wang Shi-ting; Lilia Biktyakova	6; 0	6; 3
3	(Chinese Taipei) (Uzbekistan)	Julie Huang / Janet Lee; Lilia Biktyakova / Luiza Biktyakova	6; 0	6; 1

== Indonesia vs. Uzbekistan ==
Indonesia
3
Thana City Golf Club, Samutpakarn, Thailand
18 February 1998
Hard (outdoors)

Uzbekistan
0

			1	2	3
1	(Indonesia) (Uzbekistan)	Wukirasih Sawondari; Iroda Tulyaganova	6; 2	3; 1		retired
2	(Indonesia) (Uzbekistan)	Wynne Prakusya; Lilia Biktyakova	6; 1	4; 6	6; 3
3	(Indonesia) (Uzbekistan)	Wynne Prakusya / Wukirasih Sawondari; Lilia Biktyakova / Luiza Biktyakova	6; 1	6; 2

== See also ==
- Fed Cup structure
