= 1998 Fed Cup Asia/Oceania Zone Group I – Initial Pool B =

Initial Group B of the 1998 Fed Cup Asia/Oceania Zone Group I was one of six pools in the Asia/Oceania Zone Group I of the 1998 Fed Cup. Three teams competed in a round robin competition with the team coming first advancing to Placement Pool A, the team coming second going to Placement Pool B, and the team coming last falling to Placement Pool C.

	(South Korea) KOR	(China) CHN	(Hong Kong) HKG	RR; W–L	Set; W–L	Game; W–L	Standings
South Korea		3–0	3–0	2–0	12–1	76–41	1
China	0–3		2–1	1–1	6–8	62–63	2
Hong Kong	0–3	1–2		0–2	2–11	39–73	3

== South Korea vs. China ==
South Korea
3
Thana City Golf Club, Samutpakarn, Thailand
16 February 1998
Hard (outdoors)

China
0

			1	2	3
1	(South Korea) (China)	Choi Young-ja; Li Li	6; 4	6; 3
2	(South Korea) (China)	Park Sung-hee; Yi Jing-Qian	6; 3	6; 2
3	(South Korea) (China)	Cho Yoon-jeong / Chung Yang-jin; Li Li / Yi Jing-Qian	6; 4	4; 6	6; 3

== South Korea vs. Hong Kong ==
South Korea
3
Thana City Golf Club, Samutpakarn, Thailand
17 February 1998
Hard (outdoors)

Hong Kong
0

			1	2	3
1	(South Korea) (Hong Kong)	Chung Yang-jin; Lin Ning	6; 4	6; 2
2	(South Korea) (Hong Kong)	Cho Yoon-jeong; Tong Ka-po	6; 3	6; 3
3	(South Korea) (Hong Kong)	Choi Young-ja / Park Sung-hee; Karen Fisher / Tang Min	6; 1	6; 3

== China vs. Hong Kong ==
China
2
Thana City Golf Club, Samutpakarn, Thailand
18 February 1998
Hard (outdoors)

Hong Kong
1

			1	2	3
1	(China) (Hong Kong)	Li Li; Tang Min	6; 1	6; 1
2	(China) (Hong Kong)	Yi Jing-Qian; Tong Ka-po	3; 6	6; 1	3; 6
3	(China) (Hong Kong)	Li Li / Yi Jing-Qian; Tang Min / Tong Ka-po	7^{7} 6^{3}	6; 2

== See also ==
- Fed Cup structure
