= 1997 Fed Cup Asia/Oceania Zone Group I – play-offs =

The play-offs of the 1997 Fed Cup Asia/Oceania Zone Group II were the final stages of the Group II Zonal Competition involving teams from Asia and Oceania. Using the positions determined in their pools, the eight teams faced off to determine their overall placing in the 1997 Fed Cup Asia/Oceania Zone Group I. The top team advanced to World Group II play-offs, and the bottom team were relegated down to the Asia/Oceania Zone Group II.

Placing	Pool A	Pool B
1	Indonesia	China
2	Chinese Taipei	Hong Kong
3	New Zealand	Thailand
4	India	Kazakhstan

== Draw ==
Play-offs
Hong Kong	0
China	3

First round
Indonesia	3
Hong Kong	0
Chinese Taipei	2
China	1

Second round
Indonesia	3
Chinese Taipei	0

Semifinals; 14 March
New Zealand	3
Kazakhstan	0
India	1
Thailand	2

Final; 15 March
New Zealand	3
Thailand	0

=== First round ===
==== Indonesia vs. Hong Kong ====
Indonesia
3
Renouf Centre, Wellington, New Zealand
14 March 1997
Plexipave hard (outdoors)

Hong Kong
0

			1	2	3
1	(Indonesia) (Hong Kong)	Wynne Prakusya; Tong Ka-po	6; 4	6; 2
2	(Indonesia) (Hong Kong)	Yayuk Basuki; Tang Min	6; 1	6; 0
3	(Indonesia) (Hong Kong)	Mimma Chernovita / Eny Sulistyowati; Lara Howes / Lin Ning	6; 3	6; 2

==== Chinese Taipei vs. China ====
Chinese Taipei
2
Renouf Centre, Wellington, New Zealand
14 March 1997
Plexipave hard (outdoors)

China
1

			1	2	3
1	(Chinese Taipei) (China)	Weng Tzu-ting; Yi Jing-Qian	1; 6	1; 6
2	(Chinese Taipei) (China)	Wang Shi-ting; Chen Li-Ling	6; 0	6; 1
3	(Chinese Taipei) (China)	Hsu Hsueh-li / Wang Shi-ting; Yi Jing-Qian / Chen Li-Ling	4; 6	6; 4	6; 3

==== New Zealand vs. Kazakhstan ====
New Zealand
3
Renouf Centre, Wellington, New Zealand
14 March 1997
Plexipave hard (outdoors)

Kazakhstan
0

			1	2	3
1	(New Zealand) (Kazakhstan)	Rewa Hudson; Tatiana Babina	6; 2	6; 3
2	(New Zealand) (Kazakhstan)	Gaye McManus; Alissa Velts	6; 3	6; 4
3	(New Zealand) (Kazakhstan)	Leanne Baker / Shelley Stephens; Tatiana Babina / Alissa Velts	6; 2	6; 3

==== India vs. Thailand ====
India
1
Renouf Centre, Wellington, New Zealand
14 March 1997
Plexipave hard (outdoors)

Thailand
2

			1	2	3
1	(India) (Thailand)	Uzman Khan; Phorhathai Suksamran	6^{5} 7^{7}	6; 3	6; 1
2	(India) (Thailand)	Arati Ponnappa; Suvimol Duangchan	3; 6	3; 6
3	(India) (Thailand)	Jahnavi Parekh / Arati Ponnappa; Suvimol Duangchan / Phorhathai Suksamran	6; 2	3; 6	2; 6

=== Repechage Round ===
==== Hong Kong vs. China ====
Hong Kong
0
Renouf Centre, Wellington, New Zealand
15 March 1997
Plexipave hard (outdoors)

China
3

			1	2	3
1	(Hong Kong) (China)	Lin Ning; Yi Jing-Qian	1; 6	2; 6
2	(Hong Kong) (China)	Lara Howes; Chen Li-Ling	2; 6	0; 6
3	(Hong Kong) (China)	Lara Howes / Lin Ning; Chen Yan / Wen Yuan	3; 6	2; 6

=== Second round ===
==== Indonesia vs. Chinese Taipei ====
Indonesia
3
Renouf Centre, Wellington, New Zealand
15 March 1997
Plexipave hard (outdoors)

Chinese Taipei
0

			1	2	3
1	(Indonesia) (Chinese Taipei)	Wynne Prakusya; Julie Huang	6; 2	6; 4
2	(Indonesia) (Chinese Taipei)	Yayuk Basuki; Wang Shi-ting	3; 6	7^{7} 6^{0}	6; 0
3	(Indonesia) (Chinese Taipei)	Wynne Prakusya / Eny Sulistyowati; Hsu Hsueh-li / Julie Huang	6; 3	6; 2

==== New Zealand vs. Thailand ====
New Zealand
3
Renouf Centre, Wellington, New Zealand
15 March 1997
Plexipave hard (outdoors)

Thailand
0

			1	2	3
1	(New Zealand) (Thailand)	Leanne Baker; Busrin Boontemleaw	6; 0	6; 0
2	(New Zealand) (Thailand)	Gaye McManus; Phorhathai Suksamran	6; 3	6; 1
3	(New Zealand) (Thailand)	Leanne Baker / Rewa Hudson; Busrin Boontemleaw / Phorhathai Suksamran	6; 1	6; 1

== Final Placements ==
Placing	Teams
Promoted	Indonesia
Second	Chinese Taipei
Third	China
Fourth	Hong Kong
Fifth	New Zealand
Sixth	Thailand
Relegated	Kazakhstan
Relegated	India

- Indonesia advanced to the World Group II play-offs, where they were drawn against Italy. They lost 0–5, and as such were relegated back to Group I for the next year.
- Kazakhstan and India were relegated down to 1998 Fed Cup Asia/Oceania Zone Group II.

== See also ==
- Fed Cup structure
