= 1998 Fed Cup Americas Zone Group I – Initial Pool A =

Initial Group A of the 1998 Fed Cup Americas Zone Group I was one of six pools in the Americas Zone Group I of the 1998 Fed Cup. Three teams competed in a round robin competition, with the team coming first advancing to Placement Pool A, the team coming second going to Placement Pool B, and the team coming last falling to Placement Pool C.

	(Paraguay) PAR	(Canada) CAN	(Uruguay) URU	RR; W–L	Set; W–L	Game; W–L	Standings
Paraguay		2–1	2–1	2–0	8–5	71–51	1
Canada	1–2		3–0	1–1	8–4	64–55	2
Uruguay	1–2	0–3		0–2	2–9	40–34	3

== Paraguay vs. Canada ==
Paraguay
2
Tennis Academy, Brasília, Brazil
13 April 1998
Red clay (outdoors)

Canada
1

			1	2	3
1	(Paraguay) (Canada)	Laura Bernal; Jana Nejedly	4; 6	2; 6
2	(Paraguay) (Canada)	Larissa Schaerer; Sonya Jeyaseelan	6^{4} 7^{7}	7; 5	6; 1
3	(Paraguay) (Canada)	Laura Bernal / Larissa Schaerer; Patricia Hy / Rene Simpson	6; 1	6; 3

== Paraguay vs. Uruguay ==
Paraguay
2
Tennis Academy, Brasília, Brazil
14 April 1998
Red clay (outdoors)

Uruguay
1

			1	2	3
1	(Paraguay) (Uruguay)	Laura Bernal; Claudia Brause	6; 2	7; 5
2	(Paraguay) (Uruguay)	Larissa Schaerer; Daniela Olivera	6; 2	6; 0
3	(Paraguay) (Uruguay)	Mariana Quintanilla / Ana Valeria Rolón; Claudia Brause / Elena Juricich	6^{4} 7^{7}	3; 6

== Canada vs. Uruguay ==
Canada
3
Tennis Academy, Brasília, Brazil
15 April 1998
Red clay (outdoors)

Uruguay
0

			1	2	3
1	(Canada) (Uruguay)	Jana Nejedly; Daniela Olivera	6; 2	6; 1
2	(Canada) (Uruguay)	Sonya Jeyaseelan; Elena Juricich	6; 4	6; 2
3	(Canada) (Uruguay)	Sonya Jeyaseelan / Rene Simpson; Claudia Brause / Cecilia Guillenea	6; 4	5; 5		retired

== See also ==
- Fed Cup structure
