= 1998 Fed Cup Asia/Oceania Zone Group II – Initial Pool B =

Initial Group B of the 1998 Fed Cup Asia/Oceania Zone Group II was one of six pools in the Asia/Oceania Zone Group II of the 1998 Fed Cup. Three teams competed in a round robin competition with the team coming first advancing to Placement Pool A, the team coming second going to Placement Pool B, and the team coming last falling to Placement Pool C.

	(Pacific Oceania) POC	(Malaysia) MAS	(Singapore) SIN	RR; W–L	Set; W–L	Game; W–L	Standings
Pacific Oceania		2–1	2–1	2–0	8–5	66–50	1
Malaysia	1–2		3–0	1–1	8–6	65–57	2
Singapore	1–2	0–3		0–2	5–10	57–81	3

== Pacific Oceania vs. Malaysia ==
Pacific Oceania
2
Thana City Golf Club, Samutpakarn, Thailand
16 February 1998
Hard (outdoors)

Malaysia
1

			1	2	3
1	(Pacific Oceania) (Malaysia)	Paiao-Asinata Short; Tan Lynn-Yin	6; 2	6; 3
2	(Pacific Oceania) (Malaysia)	Tagifano So'Onalole; Khoo Chin-bee	6; 3	6; 0
3	(Pacific Oceania) (Malaysia)	Tagifano So'Onalole / Paiao-Asinata Short; Khoo Chin-bee / Tan Lynn-Yin	3; 6	3; 6

== Malaysia vs. Singapore ==
Malaysia
3
Thana City Golf Club, Samutpakarn, Thailand
17 February 1998
Hard (outdoors)

Singapore
0

			1	2	3
1	(Malaysia) (Singapore)	Tan Lynn-Yin; Leong Jil-Lin	6; 4	4; 6	6; 1
2	(Malaysia) (Singapore)	Khoo Chin-bee; Wong Rui-Jing	6; 0	6; 1
3	(Malaysia) (Singapore)	Liew Sheau-Shan / Tan Lynn-Yin; Leong Jil-Lin / Wong Rui-Jing	5; 7	6; 4	6; 4

== Pacific Oceania vs. Singapore ==
Pacific Oceania
2
Thana City Golf Club, Samutpakarn, Thailand
18 February 1998
Hard (outdoors)

Singapore
1

			1	2	3
1	(Pacific Oceania) (Singapore)	Paiao-Asinata Short; Leong Jil-Lin	3; 6	7^{8} 6^{6}	6; 1
2	(Pacific Oceania) (Singapore)	Tagifano So'Onalole; Wong Rui-Jing	6; 1	6; 3
3	(Pacific Oceania) (Singapore)	Davilyn Godinet / Adriana Thaggard; Leong Jil-Lin / Wong Rui-Jing	3; 6	5; 7

== See also ==
- Fed Cup structure
