= 1998 Fed Cup Americas Zone Group I – Initial Pool B =

Initial Group B of the 1998 Fed Cup Americas Zone Group I was one of six pools in the Americas Zone Group I of the 1998 Fed Cup. Three teams competed in a round robin competition, with the team coming first advancing to Placement Pool A, the team coming second going to Placement Pool B, and the team coming last falling to Placement Pool C.

| | (Colombia) COL | (Brazil) BRA | (Chile) CHI | RR; W–L | Set; W–L | Game; W–L | Standings |
| Colombia | | 2–1 | 2–1 | 2–0 | 9–5 | 69–53 | 1 |
| Brazil | 1–2 | | 2–1 | 1–1 | 7–8 | 69–65 | 2 |
| Chile | 1–2 | 1–2 | | 0–2 | 6–9 | 60–80 | 3 |

== Colombia vs. Brazil ==
Colombia
2
Tennis Academy, Brasília, Brazil
13 April 1998
Red clay (outdoors)

Brazil
1

| | | | 1 | 2 | 3 |
|---|---|---|---|---|---|
| 1 | (Colombia) (Brazil) | Mariana Mesa; Vanessa Menga | 2; 6 | 2; 6 |
| 2 | (Colombia) (Brazil) | Fabiola Zuluaga; Miriam D'Agostini | 6; 1 | 7; 5 |
| 3 | (Colombia) (Brazil) | Mariana Mesa / Fabiola Zuluaga; Miriam D'Agostini / Vanessa Menga | 6; 1 | 2; 6 | 6; 2 |

== Colombia vs. Chile ==
Colombia
2
Tennis Academy, Brasília, Brazil
14 April 1998
Red clay (outdoors)

Chile
1

| | | | 1 | 2 | 3 |
|---|---|---|---|---|---|
| 1 | (Colombia) (Chile) | Mariana Mesa; Bárbara Castro | 6; 4 | 6; 2 |
| 2 | (Colombia) (Chile) | Fabiola Zuluaga; Paula Cabezas | 6; 1 | 6; 2 |
| 3 | (Colombia) (Chile) | Mariana Mesa / Fabiola Zuluaga; Paula Cabezas / Bárbara Castro | 6; 4 | 6^{5} 7^{7} | 2; 6 |

== Brazil vs. Chile ==
Brazil
2
Tennis Academy, Brasília, Brazil
15 April 1998
Red clay (outdoors)

Chile
1

| | | | 1 | 2 | 3 |
|---|---|---|---|---|---|
| 1 | (Brazil) (Chile) | Vanessa Menga; Bárbara Castro | 6; 2 | 6; 2 |
| 2 | (Brazil) (Chile) | Miriam D'Agostini; Paula Cabezas | 2; 6 | 6; 2 | 3; 6 |
| 3 | (Brazil) (Chile) | Vanessa Menga / Miriam D'Agostini; Paula Cabezas / Bárbara Castro | 5; 7 | 6; 3 | 8; 6 |

== See also ==
- Fed Cup structure
