= 1998 Fed Cup Asia/Oceania Zone Group II – Initial Pool C =

Initial Group C of the 1998 Fed Cup Asia/Oceania Zone Group II was one of six pools in the Asia/Oceania Zone Group II of the 1998 Fed Cup. Three teams competed in a round robin competition with the team coming first advancing to Placement Pool A, the team coming second going to Placement Pool B, and the team coming last falling to Placement Pool C.

	(Tajikistan) TJK	(Kazakhstan) KAZ	(Syria) SYR	RR; W–L	Set; W–L	Game; W–L	Standings
Tajikistan		2–1	3–0	2–0	11–2	82–42	1
Kazakhstan	1–2		3–0	1–1	8–6	78–66	2
Syria	0–3	0–3		0–2	1–12	26–78	3

== Tajikistan vs. Syria ==
Tajikistan
3
Thana City Golf Club, Samutpakarn, Thailand
16 February 1998
Hard (outdoors)

Syria
0

			1	2	3
1	(Tajikistan) (Syria)	Eugenia Silantieva; Farah Dayoub	6; 1	6; 0
2	(Tajikistan) (Syria)	Youliya Dimitrova; Sara Tawil	6; 1	6; 1
3	(Tajikistan) (Syria)	Youliya Dimitrova / Eugenia Silantieva; Farah Dayoub / Sara Tawil	6; 3	6; 0

== Tajikistan vs. Kazakhstan ==
Tajikistan
2
Thana City Golf Club, Samutpakarn, Thailand
17 February 1998
Hard (outdoors)

Kazakhstan
1

			1	2	3
1	(Tajikistan) (Kazakhstan)	Eugenia Silantieva; Tatiana Babina	6; 3	6; 1
2	(Tajikistan) (Kazakhstan)	Youliya Dimitrova; Alissa Velts	6; 4	3; 6	12; 14
3	(Tajikistan) (Kazakhstan)	Youliya Dimitrova / Eugenia Silantieva; Tatiana Babina / Alissa Velts	6; 2	7; 5

== Kazakhstan vs. Syria ==
Kazakhstan
3
Thana City Golf Club, Samutpakarn, Thailand
18 February 1998
Hard (outdoors)

Syria
0

			1	2	3
1	(Kazakhstan) (Syria)	Tatiana Babina; Farah Dayoub	7^{9} 6^{7}	6; 1
2	(Kazakhstan) (Syria)	Alissa Velts; Sara Tawil	5; 7	6; 2	6; 1
3	(Kazakhstan) (Syria)	Tatiana Babina / Alissa Velts; Farah Dayoub / Sara Tawil	6; 0	6; 3

== See also ==
- Fed Cup structure
