= 1998 Fed Cup Americas Zone Group I – Initial Pool C =

Initial Group C of the 1998 Fed Cup Americas Zone Group I was one of six pools in the Americas Zone Group I of the 1998 Fed Cup. Three teams competed in a round robin competition, with the team coming first advancing to Placement Pool A, the team coming second going to Placement Pool B, and the team coming last falling to Placement Pool C.

	(Venezuela) VEN	(Ecuador) ECU	(Peru) PER	RR; W–L	Set; W–L	Game; W–L	Standings
Venezuela		3–0	2–1	2–0	10–2	69–31	1
Ecuador	0–3		2–1	1–1	5–8	49–59	2
Peru	1–2	1–2		0–2	4–9	44–72	3

== Venezuela vs. Ecuador ==
Venezuela
3
Tennis Academy, Brasília, Brazil
13 April 1998
Red clay (outdoors)

Ecuador
0

			1	2	3
1	(Venezuela) (Ecuador)	Milagros Sequera; María Dolores Campana	6; 2	6; 0
2	(Venezuela) (Ecuador)	María Vento; Alexandra Guzmán	6; 1	6; 1
3	(Venezuela) (Ecuador)	Milagros Sequera / María Vento; María Dolores Campana / Nuria Niemes	6; 2	6; 4

== Ecuador vs. Peru ==
Ecuador
2
Tennis Academy, Brasília, Brazil
14 April 1998
Red clay (outdoors)

Peru
1

			1	2	3
1	(Ecuador) (Peru)	María Dolores Campana; Carla Rodríguez	6; 0	6; 1
2	(Ecuador) (Peru)	Alexandra Guzmán; María Eugenia Rojas	7; 5	6; 4
3	(Ecuador) (Peru)	María Dolores Campana / Alexandra Guzmán; Carla Rodríguez / María Eugenia Rojas	6; 1	4; 6	4; 6

== Venezuela vs. Peru ==
Venezuela
2
Tennis Academy, Brasília, Brazil
15 April 1998
Red clay (outdoors)

Peru
1

			1	2	3
1	(Venezuela) (Peru)	Milagros Sequera; Ariana Rojas	6; 2	6; 4
2	(Venezuela) (Peru)	María Vento; María Eugenia Rojas	6; 0	6; 1
3	(Venezuela) (Peru)	Analía Longoli / Fabiana Taverna; Carla Rodríguez / María Eugenia Rojas	5; 7	4; 6

== See also ==
- Fed Cup structure
