= 1997 Fed Cup Asia/Oceania Zone =

Subsection of tennis competition

The Asia/Oceania Zone was one of three zones of regional competition in the 1997 Fed Cup.

== Group I ==
- Venue: Renouf Centre, Wellington, New Zealand (outdoor hard)
- Date: 11–15 March

The eight teams were divided into two pools of four teams.

For the first time, the play-off stage of the group was used to determine placings. The top two teams from each pool would be drawn in a knockout stage to determine final placings and which team would be promoted; while the remaining teams would play-off to determine final placings and which team would be relegated.

=== Pools ===
	Pool A	INA	TPE	NZL	IND
1	Indonesia (3–0)		2–1	2–1	3–0
2	Chinese Taipei (2–1)	1–2		2–1	3–0
3	New Zealand (1–2)	1–2	1–2		2–1
4	India (0–3)	0–3	0–3	1–2	

	Pool B	CHN	HKG	THA	KAZ
1	China (3–0)		3–0	2–1	3–0
2	Hong Kong (2–1)	0–3		3–0	2–1
3	Thailand (1–2)	1–2	0–3		2–1
4	Kazakhstan (0–3)	0–3	1–2	1–2	

=== Play-offs ===
Play-offs
Hong Kong	0
China	3

First round
Indonesia	3
Hong Kong	0
Chinese Taipei	2
China	1

Second round
Indonesia	3
Chinese Taipei	0

Semifinals; 14 March
New Zealand	3
Kazakhstan	0
India	1
Thailand	2

Final; 15 March
New Zealand	3
Thailand	0

- Indonesia advanced to World Group II Play-offs.
- Kazakhstan and India relegated to Group II in 1998.

== Group II ==
- Venue: Renouf Centre, Wellington, New Zealand (outdoor hard)
- Date: 11–15 March

The eight teams were divided into two pools of four teams to compete in round-robin competitions.

As with Group I, the play-off stage of the group was used to determine placings. The top two teams from each pool would be drawn in a knockout stage to determine which teams would be promoted and final placings; while the remaining teams would play-off to determine the other placings.

=== Pools ===
	Pool A	UZB	MAS	SIN	SRI
1	Uzbekistan (2–1)		1–2	3–0	3–0
2	Malaysia (2–1)	2–1		1–2	3–0
3	Singapore (2–1)	0–3	2–1		3–0
4	Sri Lanka (0–3)	0–3	0–3	0–3	

	Pool B	PHI	POC	SYR	PAK
1	Philippines (3–0)		2–1	3–0	3–0
2	Pacific Oceania (2–1)	1–2		3–0	2–1
3	Syria (1–2)	0–3	0–3		3–0
4	Pakistan (0–3)	0–3	1–2	0–3	

=== Play-offs ===
Second Round; 15 March
Pacific Oceania	1
Malaysia	2

First Round; 14 March
Uzbekistan	2
Pacific Oceania	1
Malaysia	1
Philippines	2

Play-offs
Pakistan	2
Sri Lanka	1

First round
Singapore	3
Pakistan	0
Sri Lanka	1
Syria	2

Second round
Singapore	3
Syria	0

- Uzbekistan and Philippines advanced to Group I in 1998.

== See also ==
- Fed Cup structure
