= 1997 Fed Cup Asia/Oceania Zone Group I – Pool A =

Group A of the 1997 Fed Cup Asia/Oceania Zone Group I was one of two pools in the Asia/Oceania Zone Group I of the 1997 Fed Cup. Four teams competed in a round robin competition, with the top two teams and the bottom two teams proceeding to their respective sections of the play-offs: the top teams played for advancement to the World Group play-offs, while the bottom teams faced potential relegation to Group II.

| | (Indonesia) INA | (Chinese Taipei) TPE | (New Zealand) NZL | (India) IND | RR; W–L | Set; W–L | Game; W–L | Standings |
| Indonesia | | 2–1 | 2–1 | 3–0 | 3–0 | 14–6 | 90–71 | 1 |
| Chinese Taipei | 1–2 | | 2–1 | 3–0 | 2–1 | 14–7 | 103–70 | 2 |
| New Zealand | 1–2 | 1–2 | | 2–1 | 1–2 | 10–11 | 100–100 | 3 |
| India | 0–3 | 0–3 | 1–2 | | 0–3 | 2–16 | 31–101 | 4 |

== Indonesia vs. New Zealand ==
Indonesia
2
Renouf Centre, Wellington, New Zealand
11 March 1997
Plexipave hard (outdoors)

New Zealand
1

| | | | 1 | 2 | 3 |
|---|---|---|---|---|---|
| 1 | (Indonesia) (New Zealand) | Wynne Prakusya; Rewa Hudson | 6; 1 | 6^{9} 7^{11} | 6; 4 |
| 2 | (Indonesia) (New Zealand) | Yayuk Basuki; Gaye McManus | 6; 1 | 6; 0 |
| 3 | (Indonesia) (New Zealand) | Mimma Chernovita / Eny Sulistyowati; Leanne Baker / Shelley Stephens | 2; 6 | 6^{4} 7^{7} |

== Chinese Taipei vs. India ==
Chinese Taipei
3
Renouf Centre, Wellington, New Zealand
11 March 1997
Plexipave hard (outdoors)

India
0

| | | | 1 | 2 | 3 |
|---|---|---|---|---|---|
| 1 | (Chinese Taipei) (India) | Julie Huang; Jahnavi Parekh | 6; 4 | 6; 2 |
| 2 | (Chinese Taipei) (India) | Wang Shi-ting; Arati Ponnappa | 6; 1 | 6; 1 |
| 3 | (Chinese Taipei) (India) | Hsu Hsueh-li / Wang Shi-ting; Jahnavi Parekh / Arati Ponnappa | 6; 0 | 6; 1 |

== Indonesia vs. India ==
Indonesia
3
Renouf Centre, Wellington, New Zealand
12 March 1997
Plexipave hard (outdoors)

India
0

| | | | 1 | 2 | 3 |
|---|---|---|---|---|---|
| 1 | (Indonesia) (India) | Wynne Prakusya; Jahnavi Parekh | 6; 1 | 6; 3 |
| 2 | (Indonesia) (India) | Yayuk Basuki; Arati Ponnappa | 6; 1 | 6; 0 |
| 3 | (Indonesia) (India) | Mimma Chernovita / Eny Sulistyowati; Uzman Khan / Jahnavi Parekh | 6; 1 | 6; 2 |

== Chinese Taipei vs. New Zealand ==
Chinese Taipei
2
Renouf Centre, Wellington, New Zealand
12 March 1997
Plexipave hard (outdoors)

New Zealand
1

| | | | 1 | 2 | 3 |
|---|---|---|---|---|---|
| 1 | (Chinese Taipei) (New Zealand) | Weng Tzu-ting; Rewa Hudson | 7^{7} 6^{4} | 1; 6 | 6; 3 |
| 2 | (Chinese Taipei) (New Zealand) | Wang Shi-ting; Gaye McManus | 6; 0 | 6; 1 |
| 3 | (Chinese Taipei) (New Zealand) | Hsu Hsueh-li / Wang Shi-ting; Leanne Baker / Shelley Stephens | 5; 7 | 6; 3 | 5; 7 |

== Indonesia vs. Chinese Taipei ==
Indonesia
2
Renouf Centre, Wellington, New Zealand
13 March 1997
Plexipave hard (outdoors)

Chinese Taipei
1

| | | | 1 | 2 | 3 |
|---|---|---|---|---|---|
| 1 | (Indonesia) (Chinese Taipei) | Mimma Chernovita; Wang Shi-ting | 0; 6 | 0; 6 |
| 2 | (Indonesia) (Chinese Taipei) | Wynne Prakusya; Julie Huang | 4; 6 | 6; 1 | 6; 2 |
| 3 | (Indonesia) (Chinese Taipei) | Yayuk Basuki / Wynne Prakusya; Wang Shi-ting / Weng Tzu-ting | 6; 2 | 6; 2 |

== New Zealand vs. India ==
New Zealand
3
Renouf Centre, Wellington, New Zealand
13 March 1997
Plexipave hard (outdoors)

India
0

| | | | 1 | 2 | 3 |
|---|---|---|---|---|---|
| 1 | (New Zealand) (India) | Rewa Hudson; Uzman Khan | 2; 6 | 3; 6 |
| 2 | (New Zealand) (India) | Gaye McManus; Arati Ponnappa | 6; 3 | 6; 3 |
| 3 | (New Zealand) (India) | Leanne Baker / Shelley Stephens; Jahnavi Parekh / Arati Ponnappa | 6; 2 | 6; 2 |

== See also ==
- Fed Cup structure
