= 1998 Fed Cup Asia/Oceania Zone Group I – Placement Pool C =

Placement Group C of the 1998 Fed Cup Asia/Oceania Zone Group II was one of six pools in the Americas Zone Group I of the 1998 Fed Cup. The three teams that placed first in the initial pools competed in a round robin competition, with the top team advancing to the World Group II Play-offs.

	(Hong Kong) HKG	(Uzbekistan) UZB	(Philippines) PHI	RR; W–L	Set; W–L	Game; W–L	Standings
Hong Kong		2–1	3–0	2–0	10–3	68–46	1
Uzbekistan	1–2		2–1	1–1	6–6	55–55	2
Philippines	0–3	1–2		0–2	3–10	47–70	3

== Hong Kong vs. Philippines ==
Hong Kong
3
Thana City Golf Club, Samutpakarn, Thailand
19 February 1998
Hard (outdoors)

Philippines
0

			1	2	3
1	(Hong Kong) (Philippines)	Lin Ning; Jennifer Saret	4; 6	6; 4	6; 1
2	(Hong Kong) (Philippines)	Tong Ka-po; Marisue Jacutin	6; 1	6; 4
3	(Hong Kong) (Philippines)	Tang Min / Tong Ka-po; Pamela Floro / Jennifer Saret	6; 1	6; 4

== Uzbekistan vs. Philippines ==
Uzbekistan
2
Thana City Golf Club, Samutpakarn, Thailand
20 February 1998
Hard (outdoors)

Philippines
1

			1	2	3
1	(Uzbekistan) (Philippines)	Iroda Tulyaganova; Pamela Floro	6; 2	6; 4
2	(Uzbekistan) (Philippines)	Lilia Biktyakova; Marisue Jacutin	6; 4	6; 4
3	(Uzbekistan) (Philippines)	Luiza Biktyakova / Natalia Nikitina; Pamela Floro / Jennifer Saret	3; 6	3; 6

== Hong Kong vs. Uzbekistan ==
Hong Kong
2
Thana City Golf Club, Samutpakarn, Thailand
21 February 1998
Hard (outdoors)

Uzbekistan
1

			1	2	3
1	(Hong Kong) (Uzbekistan)	Lin Ning; Iroda Tulyaganova	1; 6	2; 6
2	(Hong Kong) (Uzbekistan)	Tong Ka-po; Lilia Biktyakova	6; 3	6; 2
3	(Hong Kong) (Uzbekistan)	Tang Min / Tong Ka-po; Lilia Biktyakova / Iroda Tulyaganova	7; 5	6; 3

== See also ==
- Fed Cup structure
