= 1997 Fed Cup Asia/Oceania Zone Group II – Pool B =

Group B of the 1997 Fed Cup Asia/Oceania Zone Group II

Group B of the 1997 Fed Cup Asia/Oceania Zone Group II was one of two pools in the Asia/Oceania Zone Group II of the 1997 Fed Cup. Four teams competed in a round robin competition, with the top two teams and the bottom two teams proceeding to their respective sections of the play-offs.

	(Philippines) PHI	(Pacific Oceania) POC	(Syria) SYR	(Pakistan) PAK	RR; W–L	Set; W–L	Game; W–L	Standings
Philippines		2–1	3–0	3–0	3–0	16–2	104–33	1
Pacific Oceania	1–2		3–0	2–1	2–1	12–5	94–70	2
Syria	0–3	0–3		3–0	1–2	7–13	71–99	3
Pakistan	0–3	1–2	0–3		0–3	1–16	40–107	4

== Philippines vs. Pakistan ==
Philippines
3
Renouf Centre, Wellington, New Zealand
11 March 1997
Plexipave hard (outdoors)

Pakistan
0

			1	2	3
1	(Philippines) (Pakistan)	Jennifer Saret; Mehvish Chishtie	6; 0	6; 1
2	(Philippines) (Pakistan)	Marisue Jacutin; Nida Waseem	6; 0	6; 0
3	(Philippines) (Pakistan)	Pamela Floro / Jennifer Saret; Sara Haider / Nida Waseem	6; 0	6; 0

== Pacific Oceania vs. Syria ==
Pacific Oceania
3
Renouf Centre, Wellington, New Zealand
11 March 1997
Plexipave hard (outdoors)

Syria
0

			1	2	3
1	(Pacific Oceania) (Syria)	Simone Wichman; Farah Dayoub	7^{7} 6^{5}	4; 6	6; 4
2	(Pacific Oceania) (Syria)	Tagifano So'Onalole; Sara Taweel	6; 2	6; 0
3	(Pacific Oceania) (Syria)	Tagifano So'Onalole / Simone Wichman; Farah Dayoub / Sara Taweel	6; 2	6; 1

== Pacific Oceania vs. Philippines ==
Pacific Oceania
1
Renouf Centre, Wellington, New Zealand
12 March 1997
Plexipave hard (outdoors)

Philippines
2

			1	2	3
1	(Pacific Oceania) (Philippines)	Vera Tere; Jennifer Saret	1; 6	1; 6
2	(Pacific Oceania) (Philippines)	Tagifano So'Onalole; Marisue Jacutin	6; 3	7; 5
3	(Pacific Oceania) (Philippines)	Tagifano So'Onalole / Vera Tere; Pamela Floro / Jennifer Saret	4; 6	4; 6

== Syria vs. Pakistan ==
Syria
3
Renouf Centre, Wellington, New Zealand
12 March 1997
Plexipave hard (outdoors)

Pakistan
0

			1	2	3
1	(Syria) (Pakistan)	Farah Dayoub; Mehvish Chishtie	4; 6	6; 2	6; 2
2	(Syria) (Pakistan)	Sara Taweel; Nida Waseem	7; 5	6; 3
3	(Syria) (Pakistan)	Farah Dayoub / Sara Taweel; Nosheem Ehtesham / Nida Waseem	6; 0	6; 4

== Philippines vs. Syria ==
Philippines
3
Renouf Centre, Wellington, New Zealand
13 March 1997
Plexipave hard (outdoors)

Syria
0

			1	2	3
1	(Philippines) (Syria)	Jennifer Saret; Farah Dayoub	6; 1	6; 1
2	(Philippines) (Syria)	Marisue Jacutin; Sara Taweel	6; 3	6; 3
3	(Philippines) (Syria)	Pamela Floro / Jennifer Saret; Sara Taweel / Shaza Tinawi	6; 1	6; 0

== Pacific Oceania vs. Pakistan ==
Pacific Oceania
2
Renouf Centre, Wellington, New Zealand
13 March 1997
Plexipave hard (outdoors)

Pakistan
1

			1	2	3
1	(Pacific Oceania) (Pakistan)	Simone Wichman; Mehvish Chishtie	6; 5			retired
2	(Pacific Oceania) (Pakistan)	Tagifano So'Onalole; Nida Waseem	6; 4	6; 4
3	(Pacific Oceania) (Pakistan)	Tagifano So'Onalole / Adriana Thaggard; Nosheem Ehtesham / Nida Waseem	6; 1	6; 3

== See also ==
- Fed Cup structure
