= 1997 Fed Cup Asia/Oceania Zone Group I – Pool B =

Group B of the 1997 Fed Cup Asia/Oceania Zone Group I was one of two pools in the Asia/Oceania Zone Group I of the 1997 Fed Cup. Four teams competed in a round robin competition, with the top two teams and the bottom two teams proceeding to their respective sections of the play-offs: the top teams played for advancement to the World Group play-offs, while the bottom teams faced potential relegation to Group II.

	(China) CHN	(Hong Kong) HKG	(Thailand) THA	(Kazakhstan) KAZ	RR; W–L	Set; W–L	Game; W–L	Standings
China		3–0	2–1	3–0	3–0	16–4	107–60	1
Hong Kong	0–3		3–0	2–1	2–1	14–8	114–80	2
Thailand	1–2	0–3		2–1	1–2	5–14	58–101	3
Kazakhstan	0–3	1–2	1–2		0–3	6–15	70–108	4

== China vs. Kazakhstan ==
China
3
Renouf Centre, Wellington, New Zealand
11 March 1997
Plexipave hard (outdoors)

Kazakhstan
0

			1	2	3
1	(China) (Kazakhstan)	Wen Yuan; Tatiana Babina	6; 2	4; 6	6; 3
2	(China) (Kazakhstan)	Yi Jing-Qian; Alissa Velts	6; 2	6; 1
3	(China) (Kazakhstan)	Chen Yan / Yi Jing-Qian; Tatiana Babina / Alissa Velts	6; 2	6; 1

== Hong Kong vs. Thailand ==
Hong Kong
3
Renouf Centre, Wellington, New Zealand
11 March 1997
Plexipave hard (outdoors)

Thailand
0

			1	2	3
1	(Hong Kong) (Thailand)	Tong Ka-po; Phorhathai Suksamran	6; 2	6; 2
2	(Hong Kong) (Thailand)	Tang Min; Suvimol Duangchan	6; 2	6; 3
3	(Hong Kong) (Thailand)	Lara Howes / Lin Ning; Suvimol Duangchan / Phorhathai Suksamran	4; 6	6; 4	6; 2

== China vs. Hong Kong ==
China
3
Renouf Centre, Wellington, New Zealand
12 March 1997
Plexipave hard (outdoors)

Hong Kong
0

			1	2	3
1	(China) (Hong Kong)	Chen Yan; Tong Ka-po	1; 6	3; 6
2	(China) (Hong Kong)	Yi Jing-Qian; Tang Min	6; 3	1; 6	7; 5
3	(China) (Hong Kong)	Chen Yan / Yi Jing-Qian; Tang Min / Tong Ka-po	7^{7} 6^{5}	6; 4

== Thailand vs. Kazakhstan ==
Thailand
2
Renouf Centre, Wellington, New Zealand
12 March 1997
Plexipave hard (outdoors)

Kazakhstan
1

			1	2	3
1	(Thailand) (Kazakhstan)	Busrin Boontemleaw; Tatiana Babina	5; 7	0; 6
2	(Thailand) (Kazakhstan)	Suvimol Duangchan; Alissa Velts	6; 1	6; 1
3	(Thailand) (Kazakhstan)	Suvimol Duangchan / Phorhathai Suksamran; Tatiana Babina / Alissa Velts	7^{7} 6^{3}	6; 4

== China vs. Thailand ==
China
3
Renouf Centre, Wellington, New Zealand
13 March 1997
Plexipave hard (outdoors)

Thailand
0

			1	2	3
1	(China) (Thailand)	Wen Yuan; Busrin Boontemleaw	6; 0	6; 0
2	(China) (Thailand)	Yi Jing-Qian; Phorhathai Suksamran	6; 1	6; 0
3	(China) (Thailand)	Chen Li-Ling / Chen Yan; Busrin Boontemleaw / Phorhathai Suksamran	6; 2	6; 4

== Hong Kong vs. Kazakhstan ==
Hong Kong
2
Renouf Centre, Wellington, New Zealand
13 March 1997
Plexipave hard (outdoors)

Kazakhstan
1

			1	2	3
1	(Hong Kong) (Kazakhstan)	Tong Ka-po; Tatiana Babina	3; 6	6; 3	4; 6
2	(Hong Kong) (Kazakhstan)	Tang Min; Alissa Velts	6; 0	6; 1
3	(Hong Kong) (Kazakhstan)	Lara Howes / Tang Min; Tatiana Babina / Alissa Velts	6; 3	1; 6	6; 3

== See also ==
- Fed Cup structure
