= 1997 Fed Cup Asia/Oceania Zone Group II – Pool A =

Group A of the 1997 Fed Cup Asia/Oceania Zone Group II was one of two pools in the Asia/Oceania Zone Group II of the 1997 Fed Cup. Four teams competed in a round robin competition, with the top two teams and the bottom two teams proceeding to their respective sections of the play-offs.

	(Uzbekistan) UZB	(Malaysia) MAS	(Singapore) SIN	(Sri Lanka) SRI	RR; W–L	Set; W–L	Game; W–L	Standings
Uzbekistan		1–2	3–0	3–0	2–1	15–4	100–55	1
Malaysia	2–1		1–2	3–0	2–1	13–7	104–63	2
Singapore	0–3	2–1		3–0	2–1	10–9	84–89	3
Sri Lanka	0–3	0–3	0–3		0–3	0–18	27–108	4

== Uzbekistan vs. Malaysia ==
Uzbekistan
1
Renouf Centre, Wellington, New Zealand
11 March 1997
Plexipave hard (outdoors)

Malaysia
2

			1	2	3
1	(Uzbekistan) (Malaysia)	Irina Yarikova; Tan Lynn-Yin	6; 1	6; 1
2	(Uzbekistan) (Malaysia)	Natalia Nikitina; Khoo Chin-bee	6; 2	0; 6	4; 6
3	(Uzbekistan) (Malaysia)	Iroda Tulyaganova / Oksana Yarikova; Khoo Chin-bee / Tan Lynn-Yin	0; 6	5; 7

== Singapore vs. Sri Lanka ==
Singapore
3
Renouf Centre, Wellington, New Zealand
11 March 1997
Plexipave hard (outdoors)

Sri Lanka
0

			1	2	3
1	(Singapore) (Sri Lanka)	Leong Jil-Lin; Anushka Rajiyah	6; 0	6; 4
2	(Singapore) (Sri Lanka)	Wong Rui-Jing; Sobhini Wickramahewa	6; 2	6; 1
3	(Singapore) (Sri Lanka)	Leong Jil-Lin / Wong Rui-Jing; Shalini Perera / Sobhini Wickramahewa	6; 4	6; 2

== Malaysia vs. Singapore ==
Malaysia
1
Renouf Centre, Wellington, New Zealand
12 March 1997
Plexipave hard (outdoors)

Singapore
2

			1	2	3
1	(Malaysia) (Singapore)	Tan Lynn-Yin; Leong Jil-Lin	6; 1	6; 4
2	(Malaysia) (Singapore)	Khoo Chin-bee; Wong Rui-Jing	4; 6	4; 6
3	(Malaysia) (Singapore)	Khoo Chin-bee / Tan Lynn-Yin; Leong Jil-Lin / Wong Rui-Jing	6; 2	0; 6	3; 6

== Uzbekistan vs. Sri Lanka ==
Uzbekistan
3
Renouf Centre, Wellington, New Zealand
12 March 1997
Plexipave hard (outdoors)

Sri Lanka
0

			1	2	3
1	(Uzbekistan) (Sri Lanka)	Irina Yarikova; Anushka Rajiyah	6; 2	6; 3
2	(Uzbekistan) (Sri Lanka)	Iroda Tulyaganova; Sobhini Wickramahewa	6; 2	6; 2
3	(Uzbekistan) (Sri Lanka)	Natalia Nikitin / Irina Yarikova; Shalini Perera / Sobhini Wickramahewa	6; 0	6; 0

== Uzbekistan vs. Singapore ==
Uzbekistan
3
Renouf Centre, Wellington, New Zealand
13 March 1997
Plexipave hard (outdoors)

Singapore
0

			1	2	3
1	(Uzbekistan) (Singapore)	Irina Yarikova; Leong Jil-Lin	7; 5	6; 3
2	(Uzbekistan) (Singapore)	Natalia Nikitina; Wong Rui-Jing	6; 4	6; 1
3	(Uzbekistan) (Singapore)	Natalia Nikitina / Irina Yarikova; Leong Jil-Lin / Wong Rui-Jing	6; 2	6; 2

== Malaysia vs. Sri Lanka ==
Malaysia
3
Renouf Centre, Wellington, New Zealand
13 March 1997
Plexipave hard (outdoors)

Sri Lanka
0

			1	2	3
1	(Malaysia) (Sri Lanka)	Tan Lynn-Yin; Anushka Rajiyah	6; 2	6; 1
2	(Malaysia) (Sri Lanka)	Khoo Chin-bee; Sobhini Wickramahewa	6; 1	6; 1
3	(Malaysia) (Sri Lanka)	Khoo Chin-bee / Tan Lynn-Yin; Dinali De Silva / Shalini Perera	6; 0	6; 0

== See also ==
- Fed Cup structure
