= 1998 Fed Cup Asia/Oceania Zone Group I – Placement Pool A =

Placement Group A of the 1998 Fed Cup Asia/Oceania Zone Group II was one of six pools in the Americas Zone Group I of the 1998 Fed Cup. The three teams that placed first in the initial pools competed in a round robin competition, with the top team advancing to the World Group II Play-offs.

	(South Korea) KOR	(Chinese Taipei) TPE	(New Zealand) NZL	RR; W–L	Set; W–L	Game; W–L	Standings
South Korea		2–1	2–0	2–0	8–3	61–46	1
Chinese Taipei	1–2		2–1	1–1	7–7	68–70	2
New Zealand	0–2	1–2		0–2	3–8	46–59	3

== South Korea vs. Chinese Taipei ==
South Korea
2
Thana City Golf Club, Samutpakarn, Thailand
19 February 1998
Hard (outdoors)

Chinese Taipei
1

			1	2	3
1	(South Korea) (Chinese Taipei)	Choi Young-ja; Janet Lee	5; 7	3; 6
2	(South Korea) (Chinese Taipei)	Park Sung-hee; Wang Shi-ting	6; 2	6; 4
3	(South Korea) (Chinese Taipei)	Choi Young-ja / Park Sung-hee; Janet Lee / Wang Shi-ting	4; 6	7; 5	6; 3

== Chinese Taipei vs. New Zealand ==
Chinese Taipei
2
Thana City Golf Club, Samutpakarn, Thailand
20 February 1998
Hard (outdoors)

New Zealand
1

			1	2	3
1	(Chinese Taipei) (New Zealand)	Janet Lee; Leanne Baker	7^{7} 6^{4}	2; 6	6; 4
2	(Chinese Taipei) (New Zealand)	Wang Shi-ting; Rewa Hudson	6; 1	6; 4
3	(Chinese Taipei) (New Zealand)	Janet Lee / Wang Shi-ting; Leanne Baker / Rewa Hudson	4; 6	4; 6

== South Korea vs. New Zealand ==
South Korea
2
Thana City Golf Club, Samutpakarn, Thailand
21 February 1998
Hard (outdoors)

New Zealand
0

			1	2	3
1	(South Korea) (New Zealand)	Choi Young-ja; Leanne Baker	6; 2	6; 4
2	(South Korea) (New Zealand)	Park Sung-hee; Rewa Hudson	6; 2	7; 5
3	(South Korea) (New Zealand)					not played

- South Korea placed first in this pool, and thus advanced to World Group II Play-offs, where they were drawn against Japan. They lost 1–4, and were relegated down back to Group I for 1999.

== See also ==
- Fed Cup structure
