= 1998 Fed Cup World Group II =

International women's tennis competition

The World Group II was the second highest level of Fed Cup competition in 1998. Winning nations advanced to the World Group play-offs, and the losing nations were demoted to the World Group II play-offs.

== Italy vs. Austria ==
Italy
3
Sports Palace, Foligno, Italy
18–19 April 1998
Greenset Trophy carpet (indoors)

Austria
2

			1	2	3
1	(Italy) (Austria)	Francesca Lubiani; Barbara Schett	1; 6	3; 6
2	(Italy) (Austria)	Silvia Farina; Barbara Schwartz	6; 4	3; 6	9; 7
3	(Italy) (Austria)	Silvia Farina; Barbara Schett	6^{4} 7^{7}	7^{7} 6^{3}	6; 2
4	(Italy) (Austria)	Francesca Lubiani; Sylvia Plischke	7^{7} 6^{5}	1; 6	6; 1
5	(Italy) (Austria)	Laura Golarsa / Francesca Lubiani; Sylvia Plischke / Barbara Schett	6^{0} 7^{7}	5; 7

== Australia vs. Russia ==
Australia
2
Royal King's Park Tennis Club, Perth, Australia
18–19 April 1998
Grass (outdoors)

Russia
3

			1	2	3
1	(Australia) (Russia)	Kerry-Anne Guse; Tatiana Panova	6; 4	3; 6	3; 6
2	(Australia) (Russia)	Rachel McQuillan; Ekaterina Sysoeva	6; 2	4; 6	10; 12
3	(Australia) (Russia)	Rachel McQuillan; Tatiana Panova	6^{0} 7^{7}	3; 6
4	(Australia) (Russia)	Kerry-Anne Guse; Ekaterina Sysoeva	4; 6	6; 3	7; 5
5	(Australia) (Russia)	Annabel Ellwood / Rennae Stubbs; Anastasia Myskina / Tatiana Panova	6; 2	6; 2

== Croatia vs. Japan ==
Croatia
4
Dubrovnik Tennis Club, Dubrovnik, Croatia
25–26 April 1998
Red clay (outdoors)

Japan
1

			1	2	3
1	(Croatia) (Japan)	Mirjana Lučić; Naoko Sawamatsu	6; 3	7^{7} 6^{5}
2	(Croatia) (Japan)	Iva Majoli; Yuka Yoshida	6; 2	6; 2
3	(Croatia) (Japan)	Iva Majoli; Naoko Sawamatsu	6; 2	6; 3
4	(Croatia) (Japan)	Mirjana Lučić; Yuka Yoshida	6; 1	6; 2
5	(Croatia) (Japan)	Jelena Kostanić / Dora Krstulović; Rika Hiraki / Nana Miyagi	3; 6	3; 6

== Argentina vs. Slovakia ==
Argentina
1
Buenos Aires L.T.C., Buenos Aires, Argentina
18–19 April 1998
Red clay (outdoors)

Slovakia
4

			1	2	3
1	(Argentina) (Slovakia)	Mariana Díaz Oliva; Henrieta Nagyová	2; 6	2; 6
2	(Argentina) (Slovakia)	Florencia Labat; Karina Habšudová	6; 4	3; 6	6; 3
3	(Argentina) (Slovakia)	Florencia Labat; Henrieta Nagyová	5; 7	4; 6
4	(Argentina) (Slovakia)	Mariana Díaz Oliva; Karina Habšudová	6; 3	2; 6	9; 11
5	(Argentina) (Slovakia)	Florencia Labat / Mercedes Paz; Karina Habšudová / Janette Husárová	6; 3	1; 6	4; 6

== See also ==
- Fed Cup structure
