= 1998 Fed Cup Asia/Oceania Zone Group I – Placement Pool B =

Placement Group B of the 1998 Fed Cup Asia/Oceania Zone Group I was one of six pools in the Americas Zone Group I of the 1998 Fed Cup. The three teams that placed first in the initial pools competed in a round robin competition, with the top team advancing to the World Group II Play-offs.

	(China) CHN	(Thailand) THA	(Indonesia) INA	RR; W–L	Set; W–L	Game; W–L	Standings
China		2–1	2–1	2–0	9–4	66–51	1
Thailand	1–2		2–1	1–1	6–7	61–61	2
Indonesia	1–2	1–2		0–2	4–8	54–69	3

== Thailand vs. Indonesia ==
Thailand
2
Thana City Golf Club, Samutpakarn, Thailand
19 February 1998
Hard (outdoors)

Indonesia
1

			1	2	3
1	(Thailand) (Indonesia)	Suvimol Duangchan; Wukirasih Sawondari	6; 3	6; 1
2	(Thailand) (Indonesia)	Tamarine Tanasugarn; Wynne Prakusya	3; 6	4; 6
3	(Thailand) (Indonesia)	Benjamas Sangaram / Tamarine Tanasugarn; Wynne Prakusya / Wukirasih Sawondari	7^{8} 6^{6}	6; 4

== China vs. Indonesia ==
China
2
Thana City Golf Club, Samutpakarn, Thailand
20 February 1998
Hard (outdoors)

Indonesia
1

			1	2	3
1	(China) (Indonesia)	Li Li; Wukirasih Sawondari	6; 2	6; 3
2	(China) (Indonesia)	Yi Jing-Qian; Wynne Prakusya	3; 6	4; 6
3	(China) (Indonesia)	Li Li / Yi Jing-Qian; Wynne Prakusya / Wukirasih Sawondari	7^{8} 6^{6}	6; 4

== China vs. Thailand ==
China
2
Thana City Golf Club, Samutpakarn, Thailand
21 February 1998
Hard (outdoors)

Thailand
1

			1	2	3
1	(China) (Thailand)	Li Li; Suvimol Duangchan	6; 0	6; 1
2	(China) (Thailand)	Yi Jing-Qian; Tamarine Tanasugarn	7^{7} 6^{4}	2; 6	1; 6
3	(China) (Thailand)	Li Li / Yi Jing-Qian; Suvimol Duangchan / Benjamas Sangaram	6; 4	6; 1

== See also ==
- Fed Cup structure
