= 1997 Fed Cup World Group II play-offs =

International tennis competition play-offs

The 1997 World Group II play-offs were four ties which involved the losing nations of the World Group II and four nations from the three Zonal Group I competitions. Nations that won their play-off ties entered the 1998 World Group II, while losing nations joined their respective zonal groups.

== Austria vs. South Africa ==
Austria
3
Werzer Arena, Pörtschach, Austria
12–13 July 1997
Red clay (outdoors)

South Africa
2

			1	2	3
1	(Austria) (South Africa)	Barbara Paulus; Joannette Kruger	6; 4	6; 4
2	(Austria) (South Africa)	Barbara Schett; Amanda Coetzer	1; 6	6^{5} 7^{7}
3	(Austria) (South Africa)	Barbara Paulus; Amanda Coetzer	2; 6	0; 6
4	(Austria) (South Africa)	Barbara Schett; Joannette Kruger	4; 6	6; 4	6; 2
5	(Austria) (South Africa)	Barbara Schett / Judith Wiesner; Amanda Coetzer / Jessica Steck	6; 1	6; 4

== South Korea vs. Russia ==
South Korea
1
Seoul Olympic Park Tennis Center, Seoul, South Korea
12–13 July 1997
Har-Tru clay (outdoors)

Russia
4

			1	2	3
1	(South Korea) (Russia)	Park Sung-hee; Elena Makarova	4; 6	6; 4	1; 6
2	(South Korea) (Russia)	Kim Eun-ha; Tatiana Panova	3; 6	4; 6
3	(South Korea) (Russia)	Park Sung-hee; Tatiana Panova	6; 4	1; 6	1; 6
4	(South Korea) (Russia)	Kim Eun-ha; Elena Makarova	6^{7} 7^{9}	3; 6
5	(South Korea) (Russia)	Cho Yoon-jeong / Choi Young-ja; Evgenia Kulikovskaya / Ekaterina Sysoeva	6; 1	6; 3

== Indonesia vs. Italy ==
Indonesia
0
Gelora Senayan Stadium, Jakarta, Indonesia
12–13 July 1997
Red clay (outdoors)

Italy
5

			1	2	3
1	(Indonesia) (Italy)	Wukirasih Sawondari; Silvia Farina	2; 6	4; 6
2	(Indonesia) (Italy)	Wynne Prakusya; Flora Perfetti	3; 6	7^{8} 6^{6}	1; 6
3	(Indonesia) (Italy)	Wynne Prakusya; Silvia Farina	1; 6	4; 6
4	(Indonesia) (Italy)	Wukirasih Sawondari; Flora Perfetti	4; 6	1; 6
5	(Indonesia) (Italy)	Liza Andriyani / Eny Sulistyowati; Flora Perfetti / Gloria Pizzichini	1; 6	2; 6

== Slovakia vs. Canada ==
Slovakia
5
Slovan Kerametal Tennis Club, Bratislava, Slovakia
12–13 July 1997
Red clay (outdoors)

Canada
0

			1	2	3
1	(Slovakia) (Canada)	Karina Habšudová; Rene Simpson	6; 3	6; 4
2	(Slovakia) (Canada)	Henrieta Nagyová; Patricia Hy	6; 3	6; 4
3	(Slovakia) (Canada)	Karina Habšudová; Patricia Hy	6; 2	7^{8} 6^{6}
4	(Slovakia) (Canada)	Henrieta Nagyová; Rene Simpson	6; 0	7^{8} 6^{6}
5	(Slovakia) (Canada)	Karina Habšudová / Katarína Studeníková; Sonya Jeyaseelan / Rene Simpson	4; 6	2; 0		retired

== See also ==
- Fed Cup structure
