= Nida Waseem =

Pakistani former tennis player

Nida Waseem (born 1 November 1982, Karachi) is a former tennis player from Pakistan.

== Background ==
Waseem was born in Karachi. She started playing tennis when she was about 7 and continued with as she enjoyed the sport. Her parents encouraged and supported her. She earned her bachelor's degree from Boston College, Boston, United States and her law degree from the UK.

== Career ==
She was once the Pakistan's youngest national champion and was a dominant force on the national scene during her teenage years. At an International Tennis Federation (ITF) junior ranking event, held in Islamabad in 2000, she beat the Indian player, Sania Mirza. As a junior, she was in the top 10 players in Asia. She took a break while she pursued her studies though she continued playing college tennis in the USA. While at Boston College she was the captain of the tennis team.

=== National ===
Waseem represented Sindh in domestic tournaments. At the 30th National Games held at the CDGK Sports Complex in Karachi in 2007, Waseem won three golds: singles, doubles and team. In singles, she beat Army's Natasha Afridi, 6-2 and 6–4. She paired with Farah Khurshid to beat the Army pair of Sara Mahboob Khan and Natasha Afridi, 6-2 and 6–2.

=== International ===
Waseem played in her first Fed Cup match as a 14 year old against Philippines' Marisue Jacutin on 11 March 1997 in Wellington, New Zealand. She went on to lose it in 2 straight sets (0–6, 0–6).

=== Singles ===
- Ties:13
- Matches: 13
- W-L: 4–9

Outcome	No.	Date	Edition	Surface	Against	Opponent	Score
Runner-up	1.	March 1997	1997 Fed Cup; Asia/Oceania Zone II	Hard	Philippines	(Philippines) Marisue Jacutin	0-6, 0–6
Runner-up	2.	March 1997	1997 Fed Cup; Asia/Oceania Zone II	Hard	Syria	(Syria) Sara Taweel	5-7, 3–6
Runner-up	3.	March 1997	1997 Fed Cup; Asia/Oceania Zone II	Hard	Pacific Oceania	(Pacific Oceania) Tagifano So'onalole	4-6, 4–6
Runner-up	4.	March 1997	1997 Fed Cup; Asia/Oceania Zone II (Play-Off)	Hard	Singapore	(Singapore) Rui-Jing Wong	1-6, 1–6
Runner-up	5.	March 1997	1997 Fed Cup; Asia/Oceania Zone II (Play-Off)	Hard	Sri Lanka	(Sri Lanka) Sobhini Wickramahewa	4-6, 4–6
Runner-up	6.	February 1998	1998 Fed Cup; Asia/Oceania Zone II	Hard	India	(India) Nirupama Vaidyanathan	0-6, 1–6
Winner	7.	February 1998	1998 Fed Cup; Asia/Oceania Zone II	Hard	Iraq	(Iraq) Ishraq Salman	6-2, 6–1
Runner-up	8.	February 1998	1998 Fed Cup; Asia/Oceania Zone II (Play-Off)	Hard	Malaysia	(Malaysia) Chin-Bee Khoo	0-6, 1–6
Runner-up	9.	February 1998	1998 Fed Cup; Asia/Oceania Zone II (Play-Off)	Hard	Kazakhstan	(Kazakhstan) Alissa Velts	6-7, 1–6
Winner	10.	April 2000	2000 Fed Cup; Asia/Oceania Zone II	Hard	Sri Lanka	(Sri Lanka) Sobhini de Silva	6-0, 6–2
Runner-up	11.	April 2000	2000 Fed Cup; Asia/Oceania Zone II	Hard	Philippines	(Philippines) Maricris Fernandez	1-6, 6–7
Winner	12.	April 2000	2000 Fed Cup; Asia/Oceania Zone II	Hard	Syria	(Syria) Farah Dayoub	6-2, 6–3
Winner	13.	April 2000	2000 Fed Cup; Asia/Oceania Zone II	Hard	Jordan	(Jordan) Dina Naffa	6-0, 6–1

=== Doubles ===
Outcome	No.	Date	Edition	Surface	Against	Partner	Opponents	Score
Runner-up	1.	March 1997	1997 Fed Cup; Asia/Oceania Zone II	Hard	Syria	(Pakistan) Nosheen Ehtesham	(Syria) Farah Dayoub (Syria) Sara Taweel	0–6, 4–6
Runner-up	2.	March 1997	1997 Fed Cup; Asia/Oceania Zone II	Hard	Pacific Oceania	(Pakistan) Nosheen Ehtesham	(Pacific Oceania) Tagifano SO'ONALOLE (Pacific Oceania) Adriana Thaggard	1–6, 3–6
Winner	3.	April 2000	2000 Fed Cup; Asia/Oceania Zone II	Hard	Syria	(Pakistan) Nosheen Ehtesham	(Syria) Farah Dayoub (Syria) Hazar Sidki	6-3, 1–6, 6–1
Winner	4.	April 2000	2000 Fed Cup; Asia/Oceania Zone II	Hard	Jordan	(Pakistan) Nosheen Ehtesham	(Jordan) Dina Ajani (Jordan) Dina Naffa	6-2, 6–1

== Awards ==
Waseem was awarded the President's Pride of Performance medal (2008) for her services to tennis. The medal was accompanied by a cheque of Rs. 0.3 million.
