= 1998 Fed Cup Americas Zone Group I – Placement Pool A =

Placement Group A of the 1998 Fed Cup Americas Zone Group II was one of six pools in the Americas Zone Group I of the 1998 Fed Cup. The three teams that placed first in the initial pools competed in a round robin competition, with the top team advancing to the World Group II Play-offs.

| | (Venezuela) VEN | (Paraguay) PAR | (Colombia) COL | RR; W–L | Set; W–L | Game; W–L | Standings |
| Venezuela | | 2–1 | 2–1 | 2–0 | 10–4 | 72–59 | 1 |
| Paraguay | 1–2 | | 3–0 | 1–1 | 8–7 | 73–71 | 2 |
| Colombia | 1–2 | 0–3 | | 0–2 | 4–11 | 71–86 | 3 |

== Paraguay vs. Colombia ==
Paraguay
3
Tennis Academy, Brasília, Brazil
13 April 1998
Red clay (outdoors)

Colombia
0

| | | | 1 | 2 | 3 |
|---|---|---|---|---|---|
| 1 | (Paraguay) (Colombia) | Laura Bernal; Mariana Mesa | 5; 7 | 6; 3 | 9; 7 |
| 2 | (Paraguay) (Colombia) | Larissa Schaerer; Fabiola Zuluaga | 7; 5 | 6; 4 |
| 3 | (Paraguay) (Colombia) | Laura Bernal / Larissa Schaerer; Mariana Mesa / Fabiola Zuluaga | 2; 6 | 6; 3 | 6; 3 |

== Venezuela vs. Paraguay ==
Venezuela
2
Tennis Academy, Brasília, Brazil
14 April 1998
Red clay (outdoors)

Paraguay
1

| | | | 1 | 2 | 3 |
|---|---|---|---|---|---|
| 1 | (Venezuela) (Paraguay) | Milagros Sequera; Laura Bernal | 6; 0 | 6; 3 |
| 2 | (Venezuela) (Paraguay) | María Vento; Larissa Schaerer | 7^{7} 6^{3} | 1; 6 | 1; 6 |
| 3 | (Venezuela) (Paraguay) | Milagros Sequera / María Vento; Laura Bernal / Larissa Schaerer | 6; 3 | 6; 2 |

== Venezuela vs. Colombia ==
Venezuela
2
Tennis Academy, Brasília, Brazil
15 April 1998
Red clay (outdoors)

Colombia
1

| | | | 1 | 2 | 3 |
|---|---|---|---|---|---|
| 1 | (Venezuela) (Colombia) | Milagros Sequera; Mariana Mesa | 7^{8} 6^{6} | 6; 2 |
| 2 | (Venezuela) (Colombia) | María Vento; Fabiola Zuluaga | 7^{7} 6^{4} | 6^{6} 7^{8} | 1; 6 |
| 3 | (Venezuela) (Colombia) | Milagros Sequera / María Vento; Mariana Mesa / Fabiola Zuluaga | 6; 4 | 6; 2 |

- Venezuela advanced to the World Group II Play-offs, where they were drawn against Belarus. They lost 1–4, and were relegated down back to Group I for 1999.

== See also ==
- Fed Cup structure
