= 1998 Fed Cup Asia/Oceania Zone Group II – Placement Pool C =

Placement Group C of the 1998 Fed Cup Asia/Oceania Zone Group II was one of six pools in the Asia/Oceania Zone Group II of the 1998 Fed Cup. The three teams that placed third in the initial pools competed in a round robin competition, with the team placing last relegated to Group II for 1999.

	(Singapore) SIN	(Syria) SYR	(Iraq) IRQ	RR; W–L	Set; W–L	Game; W–L	Standings
Singapore		2–1	3–0	2–0	10–3	69–34	1
Syria	1–2		2–0	1–1	6–4	46–41	2
Iraq	0–3	0–2		0–2	1–10	24–64	3

== Singapore vs. Iraq ==
Singapore
3
Thana City Golf Club, Samutpakarn, Thailand
19 February 1998
Hard (outdoors)

Iraq
0

			1	2	3
1	(Singapore) (Iraq)	Tan Yee-Hong; Mina Abdul-Rahman	3; 6	6; 3	6; 1
2	(Singapore) (Iraq)	Wong Rui-Jing; Ishraq Salman	6; 0	6; 0
3	(Singapore) (Iraq)	Tan Yee-Hong / Wong Rui-Jing; Mina Abdul-Rahman / Ishraq Salman	6; 3	6; 0

== Singapore vs. Syria ==
Singapore
2
Thana City Golf Club, Samutpakarn, Thailand
20 February 1998
Hard (outdoors)

Syria
1

			1	2	3
1	(Singapore) (Syria)	Leong Jil-Lin; Farah Dayoub	6; 2	6; 3
2	(Singapore) (Syria)	Wong Rui-Jing; Sara Tawil	6; 3	6; 1
3	(Singapore) (Syria)	Leong Jil-Lin / Tan Yee-Hong; Farah Dayoub / Sara Tawil	2; 6	4; 6

== Syria vs. Iraq ==
Syria
2
Thana City Golf Club, Samutpakarn, Thailand
21 February 1998
Hard (outdoors)

Iraq
0

			1	2	3
1	(Syria) (Iraq)	Sandrella Droubi; Salima-Esmat Salman	6; 1	6; 2
2	(Syria) (Iraq)	Shaza Tinawi; Mina Abdul-Rahman	7; 5	6; 3
3	(Syria) (Iraq)	Sandrella Droubi / Shaza Tinawi; Salima-Esmat Salman / Mina Abdul-Rahman				not played

== See also ==
- Fed Cup structure
