= 1998 Fed Cup Asia/Oceania Zone Group II – Placement Pool A =

Placement Group A of the 1998 Fed Cup Asia/Oceania Zone Group II was one of six pools in the Asia/Oceania Zone Group II of the 1998 Fed Cup. The three teams that placed first in the initial pools competed in a round robin competition, with the top team advancing to the World Group II Play-offs.

	(India) IND	(Pacific Oceania) POC	(Tajikistan) TJK	RR; W–L	Set; W–L	Game; W–L	Standings
India		2–0	2–1	2–0	8–3	66–46	1
Pacific Oceania	0–2		2–0	1–1	4–4	41–36	2
Tajikistan	1–2	0–2		0–2	3–8	38–63	3

== India vs. Tajikistan ==
India
2
Thana City Golf Club, Samutpakarn, Thailand
19 February 1998
Hard (outdoors)

Tajikistan
1

			1	2	3
1	(India) (Tajikistan)	Uzma Khan; Eugenia Silantieva	4; 6	6; 0	6; 0
2	(India) (Tajikistan)	Nirupama Vaidyanathan; Youliya Dimitrova	7^{7} 6^{4}	6; 4
3	(India) (Tajikistan)	Rushmi Chakravarthi / Arati Ponnappa; Youliya Dimitrova / Eugenia Silantieva	4; 6	6^{0} 7^{7}

== Pacific Oceania vs. India ==
Pacific Oceania
0
Thana City Golf Club, Samutpakarn, Thailand
20 February 1998
Hard (outdoors)

India
2

			1	2	3
1	(Pacific Oceania) (India)	Paiao-Asinata Short; Uzma Khan	5; 7	5; 7
2	(Pacific Oceania) (India)	Tagifano So'Onalole; Nirupama Vaidyanathan	2; 6	5; 7
3	(Pacific Oceania) (India)	Tagifano So'Onalole / Paiao-Asinata Short; Uzma Khan / Nirupama Vaidyanathan				not played

== Pacific Oceania vs. Tajikistan ==
Pacific Oceania
2
Thana City Golf Club, Samutpakarn, Thailand
21 February 1998
Hard (outdoors)

Tajikistan
0

			1	2	3
1	(Pacific Oceania) (Tajikistan)	Paiao-Asinata Short; Eugenia Silantieva	6; 3	6; 1
2	(Pacific Oceania) (Tajikistan)	Tagifano So'Onalole; Youliya Dimitrova	6; 2	6; 3
3	(Pacific Oceania) (Tajikistan)	Paiao-Asinata Short / Tagifano So'Onalole; Youliya Dimitrova / Eugenia Silantieva				not played

- India and Pacific Oceania placed first and second in this pool, and thus advanced to Group I for 1999. India placed second in their pool of five, while Pacific Oceania placed last in their pool and thus were relegated back down to Group II for 2000.

== See also ==
- Fed Cup structure
