= 1998 Fed Cup Asia/Oceania Zone Group II – Placement Pool B =

Placement Group B of the 1998 Fed Cup Asia/Oceania Zone Group II was one of six pools in the Asia/Oceania Zone Group II of the 1998 Fed Cup. The three teams that placed second in the initial pools competed in a round robin competition.

	(Malaysia) MAS	(Kazakhstan) KAZ	(Pakistan) PAK	RR; W–L	Set; W–L	Game; W–L	Standings
Malaysia		2–0	3–0	2–0	10–2	67–27	1
Kazakhstan	0–2		2–0	1–1	6–4	51–40	2
Pakistan	0–3	0–2		0–2	0–10	10–61	3

== Malaysia vs. Pakistan ==
Malaysia
3
Thana City Golf Club, Samutpakarn, Thailand
19 February 1998
Hard (outdoors)

Pakistan
0

			1	2	3
1	(Malaysia) (Pakistan)	Tan Lynn-Yin; Haleema Rahim	6; 0	6; 0
2	(Malaysia) (Pakistan)	Khoo Chin-bee; Nida Waseem	6; 0	6; 1
3	(Malaysia) (Pakistan)	Liew Sheau-Shan / Tan Lynn-Yin; Mehvish Chistie / Mariam Rahim	6; 0	6; 0

== Malaysia vs. Kazakhstan ==
Malaysia
2
Thana City Golf Club, Samutpakarn, Thailand
20 February 1998
Hard (outdoors)

Kazakhstan
0

			1	2	3
1	(Malaysia) (Kazakhstan)	Tan Lynn-Yin; Tatiana Babina	6; 3	3; 6	7; 5
2	(Malaysia) (Kazakhstan)	Khoo Chin-bee; Alissa Velts	6; 3	3; 6	6; 3
3	(Malaysia) (Kazakhstan)	Tan Lynn-Yin / Khoo Chin-bee; Tatiana Babina / Alissa Velts				not played

== Kazakhstan vs. Pakistan ==
Kazakhstan
2
Thana City Golf Club, Samutpakarn, Thailand
21 February 1998
Hard (outdoors)

Pakistan
0

			1	2	3
1	(Kazakhstan) (Pakistan)	Tatiana Babina; Haleema Rahim	6; 1	6; 1
2	(Kazakhstan) (Pakistan)	Alissa Velts; Nida Waseem	7^{7} 6^{5}	6; 1
3	(Kazakhstan) (Pakistan)	Tatiana Babina / Alissa Velts; Haleema Rahim / Nida Waseem				not played

== See also ==
- Fed Cup structure
