= Natalia Nikitina =

Russian handball player

Personal information
- Full name: Natalia Viktorovna Nikitina
- Nationality: Russian
- Born: 20 January 1996 (age 30) Almaty, Kazakhstan
- Height: 1.76 m (5 ft 9 in)

Sport
- Sport: Handball
- Position: Centre back
- Current club: Chernomorochka
- Number: 55

Youth career
- Years: Team
- 2014-2015: Rostov-Don

Senior clubs
- Years: Team
- 2015-2016: Rostov-Don
- 2016-2023: Zvezda Zvenigorod
- 2023-: Chernomorochka
Medal record
World Junior Championship
Silver medal – second place	2016 Russia
European Junior Championship
Silver medal – second place	2015 Spain

Natalia Viktorovna Nikitina (Russian: Наталья Викторовна Никитина) (born 20 January 1996) is a Russian handball player who plays for Chernomorochka Novorossiysk in the Russian Super League.

She also represented Russia in the 2016 Women's Junior World Handball Championship, placing as runners-up.

== Achievements ==
- Russian Super League
  - Silver Medalist: 2016
  - Bronze Medalist: 2015
- Russian Cup:
  - Winner: 2016
  - Bronze Medalist: 2019
- World Junior Championship:
  - Silver Medalist: 2016
- European Junior Championship:
  - Silver Medalist: 2015
