= 1998 Fed Cup Americas Zone Group I – Placement Pool C =

Placement Group C of the 1998 Fed Cup Americas Zone Group II was one of six pools in the Americas Zone Group I of the 1998 Fed Cup. The three teams that placed third in the initial pools competed in a round robin competition, with the teams placing second and third relegated to Group II for 1999.

	(Chile) CHI	(Uruguay) ECU	(Peru) PER	RR; W–L	Set; W–L	Game; W–L	Standings
Chile		3–0	2–0	2–0	10–0	70–21	1
Uruguay	0–3		2–1	1–1	4–9	48–70	2
Peru	0–2	1–2		0–2	3–8	43–60	3

== Uruguay vs. Peru ==
Uruguay
2
Tennis Academy, Brasília, Brazil
16 April 1998
Red clay (outdoors)

Peru
1

			1	2	3
1	(Uruguay) (Peru)	Claudia Brause; Carla Rodríguez	4; 6	3; 6
2	(Uruguay) (Peru)	Elena Juricich; María Eugenia Rojas	7; 5	6; 3
3	(Uruguay) (Peru)	Claudia Brause / Cecilia Guillenea; Carla Rodríguez / María Eugenia Rojas	6; 4	4; 6	6; 4

== Chile vs. Uruguay ==
Chile
2
Tennis Academy, Brasília, Brazil
17 April 1998
Red clay (outdoors)

Uruguay
0

			1	2	3
1	(Chile) (Uruguay)	Bárbara Castro; Cecilia Guillenea	6; 2	6; 3
2	(Chile) (Uruguay)	Paula Cabezas; Elena Juricich	6; 3	6; 2
3	(Chile) (Uruguay)	Bárbara Castro / Karem Harboe; Cecilia Guillenea / Daniela Olivera	6; 1	6; 1

== Chile vs. Peru ==
Chile
2
Tennis Academy, Brasília, Brazil
18 April 1998
Red clay (outdoors)

Peru
0

			1	2	3
1	(Chile) (Peru)	Paula Cabezas; Ariana Rojas	6; 4	6; 2
2	(Chile) (Peru)	Valentina Castro; María Eugenia Rojas	6; 1	6; 2
3	(Chile) (Peru)	Paula Cabezas / Valentina Castro; Ariana Rojas / María Eugenia Rojas				not played

- Uruguay and Peru placed second and third in this pool, and there were relegated down to Group II for 1999. Both teams placed first in their pools of four, and thus proceeded the knockout stage. Uruguay won two matches in the knockout stage and thus advanced back to Group I for 2000, while Peru only won one match and thus remained in Group II for 2000.

== See also ==
- Fed Cup structure
