= 1998 Fed Cup Americas Zone Group I – Placement Pool B =

Placement Group B of the 1998 Fed Cup Americas Zone Group I was one of six pools in the Americas Zone Group I of the 1998 Fed Cup. The three teams that placed second in the initial pools competed in a round robin competition.

	(Canada) CAN	(Brazil) BRA	(Ecuador) ECU	RR; W–L	Set; W–L	Game; W–L	Standings
Canada		3–0	3–0	2–0	12–1	78–39	1
Brazil	0–3		2–0	1–1	4–6	45–51	2
Ecuador	0–3	0–2		0–2	1–10	23–66	3

== Brazil vs. Ecuador ==
Brazil
2
Tennis Academy, Brasília, Brazil
16 April 1998
Red clay (outdoors)

Ecuador
0

			1	2	3
1	(Brazil) (Ecuador)	Vanessa Menga; María Dolores Campana	7; 5	6; 3
2	(Brazil) (Ecuador)	Miriam D'Agostini; Alexandra Guzmán	6; 4	6; 2
3	(Brazil) (Ecuador)	Miriam D'Agostini / Vanessa Menga; María Dolores Campana / Alexandra Guzmán				not played

== Canada vs. Ecuador ==
Canada
3
Tennis Academy, Brasília, Brazil
17 April 1998
Red clay (outdoors)

Ecuador
0

			1	2	3
1	(Canada) (Ecuador)	Jana Nejedly; María Dolores Campana	6; 4	5; 7	6; 4
2	(Canada) (Ecuador)	Sonya Jeyaseelan; Alexandra Guzmán	6; 1	6; 1
3	(Canada) (Ecuador)	Sonya Jeyaseelan / Rene Simpson; Paola Guerrero / Nuria Niemes	6; 0	6; 2

== Canada vs. Brazil ==
Canada
3
Tennis Academy, Brasília, Brazil
18 April 1998
Red clay (outdoors)

Brazil
0

			1	2	3
1	(Canada) (Brazil)	Jana Nejedly; Joana Cortez	6; 4	6; 3
2	(Canada) (Brazil)	Sonya Jeyaseelan; Vanessa Menga	6; 1	6; 2
3	(Canada) (Brazil)	Sonya Jeyaseelan / Rene Simpson; Miriam D'Agostini / Vanessa Menga	6; 4	7^{8} 6^{6}

== See also ==
- Fed Cup structure
