= Iraq Billie Jean King Cup team =

The Iraq Fed Cup team represents Iraq in Fed Cup tennis competition and are governed by the Iraqi Tennis Federation. They have not competed since 2014.

== History ==
Iraq competed in its first Fed Cup in 1998. They have lost all their ties to date.

== See also ==
- Billie Jean King Cup
- Iraq Davis Cup team
