= Eny Sulistyowati =

Indonesian tennis player

- Country (sports): Indonesia
- Born: 14 January 1980 (age 45); Sukoharjo, Indonesia
- Plays: Right-handed
- Prize money: $10,446

Singles
- Career record: 20–37
- Highest ranking: No. 662 (16 January 1995)

Doubles
- Career record: 29–40
- Highest ranking: No. 445 (23 February 1998)

Eny Sulistyowati (born 14 January 1980) is an Indonesian former professional tennis player.

Born in Sukoharjo, Sulistyowati had a career high singles ranking of 662 and made two main draw appearances at the Danamon Open, a WTA Tour tournament in Jakarta. She featured as a doubles player for the Indonesia Fed Cup team across 1997 and 1998, winning four rubbers.

== ITF finals ==
=== Doubles: 2 (0–2) ===
Result	No.	Date	Tournament	Surface	Partner	Opponents	Score
Loss	1.	6 April 1997	Bandung, Indonesia	Hard	(Indonesia) Wynne Prakusya	(Japan) Tomoe Hotta (Japan) Yoriko Yamagishi	6–2, 6–7, 5–7
Loss	2.	8 May 2005	Tarakan, Indonesia	Hard	(Indonesia) Maya Rosa	(Indonesia) Wynne Prakusya (Indonesia) Romana Tedjakusuma	5–7, 2–6
