= Marisue Jacutin =

Filipino tennis player (born 1979)

- Full name: Marisue Jacutin de Mariona
- Country (sports): Philippines
- Born: 14 May 1979 (age 46)
- Height: 5 ft 0 in (152 cm)
- Plays: Right-handed

Singles
- Career record: 4–10
- Highest ranking: No. 875 (Sep 15, 1997)

Doubles
- Career record: 2–4
- Highest ranking: No. 742 (Dec 8, 1997)
Medal record
Southeast Asian Games
Silver medal – second place	1999 Bandar	Women's team
Bronze medal – third place	1997 Jakarta	Women's team

Marisue Jacutin de Mariona (born 14 May 1979) is a Filipino former professional tennis player.

Jacutin is originally from Cagayan de Oro but now lives in the United States.

Short in stature at five foot, Jacutin was a right-handed player with a double-handed forehand and appeared in 14 Fed Cup ties for the Philippines in the late 1990s. She also represented her country at the Southeast Asian Games.

In 1999 she moved to the United States and played collegiate tennis for Oklahoma City University. While in college she made the occasional appearances in professional tournaments and continued to compete briefly after graduation.

She and husband Rodrigo, a Salvadoran native, are the parents of soccer player Javier Mariona, who competes for the Oakland Roots. Her father in law is former El Salvodor international footballer Salvador Mariona.
