= 1998 Fed Cup World Group II play-offs =

The 1998 World Group II play-offs were four ties which involved the losing nations of the World Group II and four nations from the three Zonal Group I competitions. Nations that won their play-off ties entered the 1999 World Group II, while losing nations joined their respective zonal groups.

== Australia vs. Argentina ==
Australia
5
AIS Arena, Canberra, Australia
25–26 July 1998
Nuhide carpet (indoors)

Argentina
0

			1	2	3
1	(Australia) (Argentina)	Jelena Dokić; Mariana Díaz Oliva	6; 2	6; 2
2	(Australia) (Argentina)	Nicole Pratt; Celeste Contín	6; 2	6; 4
3	(Australia) (Argentina)	Nicole Pratt; Mariana Díaz Oliva	6; 3	3; 6	6; 4
4	(Australia) (Argentina)	Jelena Dokić; Laura Montalvo	6; 3	6; 2
5	(Australia) (Argentina)	Kerry-Anne Guse / Rachel McQuillan; Erica Krauth / Laura Montalvo	6; 4	6; 3

== Austria vs. Poland ==
Austria
5
Salzburg-Begheim T.C., Bergheim, Austria
25–26 July 1998
Red clay (outdoors)

Poland
0

			1	2	3
1	(Austria) (Poland)	Sylvia Plischke; Magdalena Grzybowska	6; 2	3; 6	6; 0
2	(Austria) (Poland)	Barbara Schett; Aleksandra Olsza	4; 6	6; 0	6; 3
3	(Austria) (Poland)	Barbara Schett; Magdalena Feistel	6; 0	6; 2
4	(Austria) (Poland)	Sylvia Plischke; Aleksandra Olsza	6; 0	6; 1
5	(Austria) (Poland)	Sylvia Plischke / Barbara Schett; Magdalena Feistel / Katarzyna Teodorowicz-Lisowska	6; 4	6; 0

== South Korea vs. Japan ==
South Korea
1
Jang Choong Centre, Seoul, South Korea
25–26 July 1998
Red clay (outdoors)

Japan
4

			1	2	3
1	(South Korea) (Japan)	Kim Eun-ha; Miho Saeki	6; 2	4; 6	4; 6
2	(South Korea) (Japan)	Choi Ju-yeon; Ai Sugiyama	1; 6	1; 6
3	(South Korea) (Japan)	Kim Eun-ha; Ai Sugiyama	4; 6	5; 7
4	(South Korea) (Japan)	Cho Yoon-jeong; Miho Saeki	4; 6	3; 6
5	(South Korea) (Japan)	Choi Young-ja / Kim Eun-ha; Naoko Kijimuta / Nana Miyagi	6; 2	7^{7} 6^{5}

== Belarus vs. Venezuela ==
Belarus
4
National Centre, Minsk, Belarus
25–26 July 1998
Supreme hard (indoors)

Venezuela
1

			1	2	3
1	(Belarus) (Venezuela)	Olga Barabanschikova; María Vento	6; 2	6; 2
2	(Belarus) (Venezuela)	Natasha Zvereva; Milagros Sequera	6; 1	6; 2
3	(Belarus) (Venezuela)	Natasha Zvereva; María Vento	3; 6	6; 3	4; 6
4	(Belarus) (Venezuela)	Olga Barabanschikova; Milagros Sequera	6; 3	6; 2
5	(Belarus) (Venezuela)	Olga Barabanschikova / Nadejda Ostrovskaya; Milagros Sequera / María Vento	7; 5	6; 3

== See also ==
- Fed Cup structure
