= 1998 Fed Cup =

International women's tennis competition

Details
- Duration: 18 April – 20 September
- Edition: 36th

Achievements (singles)

The 1998 Fed Cup was the 36th edition of the most important competition between national teams in women's tennis. In the final, Spain defeated Switzerland at Palexpo Hall in Geneva, Switzerland on 19–20 September, giving Spain its fifth title.

== World Group ==
Participating teams
Belgium	Czech Republic	France	Germany
Netherlands	Spain	Switzerland	United States

=== Draw ===
Quarterfinals; 18–19 April
Ghent, Belgium (Indoor hard)
1	France	3
Belgium	2
Brno, Czech Republic (Indoor carpet)
Switzerland	4
4	Czech Republic	1
Saarbrücken, Germany (Indoor carpet)
3	Spain	3
Germany	2
Kiawah Island, SC, USA (Outdoor clay)
United States	5
2	Netherlands	0

Semifinals; 25–26 July
Sion, Switzerland (Outdoor clay)
1	France	0
Switzerland	5
Madrid, Spain (Outdoor clay)
3	Spain	3
United States	2

Final; 19–20 September
Geneva, Switzerland (Indoor hard)
Switzerland	2
3	Spain	3

== World Group play-offs ==
The four losing teams in the World Group first round ties (Belgium, Czech Republic, Germany and Netherlands), and four winners of the World Group II ties (Croatia, Italy, Russia and Slovakia) entered the draw for the World Group play-offs.

Date: 25–26 July

Venue	Surface	Home team	Score	Visiting team
Bratislava, Slovakia	Outdoor clay	Slovakia	4–1	Belgium
Moscow, Russia	Indoor hard	Russia	4–1	Germany
Bol, Croatia	Outdoor clay	Croatia	3–2	Netherlands
Prague, Czech Republic	Outdoor clay	Czech Republic	1–4	Italy

== World Group II ==
The World Group II was the second highest level of Fed Cup competition in 1998. Winners advanced to the World Group play-offs, and losers played in the World Group II play-offs.

Date: 18–19 April

Venue	Surface	Home team	Score	Visiting team
Foligno, Italy	Indoor carpet	Italy	3–2	Austria
Perth, Australia	Outdoor grass	Australia	2–3	Russia
Dubrovnik, Croatia	Outdoor clay	Croatia	4–1	Japan
Buenos Aires, Argentina	Outdoor clay	Argentina	1–4	Slovakia

== World Group II play-offs ==
The four losing teams from World Group II (Argentina, Australia, Austria and Japan) played off against qualifiers from Zonal Group I. Two teams qualified from Europe/Africa Zone (Belarus and Poland), one team from the Asia/Oceania Zone (South Korea), and one team from the Americas Zone (Venezuela).

Date: 12–13 July

Venue	Surface	Home team	Score	Visiting team
Canberra, Australia	Indoor carpet	Australia	5–0	Argentina
Bergheim, Austria	Outdoor clay	Austria	5–0	Poland
Seoul, South Korea	Outdoor clay	South Korea	1–4	Japan
Minsk, Belarus	Indoor hard	Belarus	4–1	Venezuela

== Americas Zone ==
- Nations in **bold** advanced to the higher level of competition.
- Nations in italics were relegated down to a lower level of competition.

=== Group I ===
Venue: Tennis Academy, Brasília, Brazil (outdoor clay)

Dates: 14–17 April

Participating teams

- Brazil
- Canada
- Chile
- Colombia
- Ecuador
- Paraguay
- Peru
- Uruguay
- **Venezuela**

=== Group II ===
Venue: Chipinque Racquet Club, Monterrey, Mexico (outdoor clay)

Dates: 27 April – 3 May

Participating teams

- Antigua and Barbuda
- Bahamas
- Barbados
- Bermuda
- Bolivia
- Costa Rica
- Cuba
- Dominican Republic
- El Salvador
- Guatemala
- Haiti
- Jamaica
- **Mexico**
- Panama
- **Puerto Rico**
- Trinidad and Tobago

== Asia/Oceania Zone ==
- Nations in **bold** advanced to the higher level of competition.
- Nations in italics were relegated down to a lower level of competition.

=== Group I ===
Venue: Thana City Golf Club, Samutpakarn, Thailand (outdoor hard)

Dates: 16–20 February

Participating teams

- China
- Chinese Taipei
- Hong Kong
- Indonesia
- New Zealand
- Philippines
- **South Korea**
- Thailand
- Uzbekistan

=== Group II ===
Venue: Thana City Golf Club, Samutpakarn, Thailand (outdoor hard)

Dates: 16–20 February

Participating teams

- **India**
- Iraq
- Kazakhstan
- Malaysia
- **Pacific Oceania**
- Pakistan
- Singapore
- Syria
- Tajikistan

== Europe/Africa Zone ==
- Nations in **bold** advanced to the higher level of competition.
- Nations in italics were relegated down to a lower level of competition.

=== Group I ===
Venue: La Manga Club, Murcia, Spain (outdoor clay)

Dates: 14–18 April

Participating teams

- **Belarus**
- Bulgaria
- Great Britain
- Greece
- Hungary
- Israel
- Latvia
- Madagascar
- **Poland**
- Portugal
- Romania
- Slovenia
- South Africa
- Sweden
- Ukraine
- Yugoslavia

=== Group II ===
Venue: Ali Bey Club, Manavgat, Turkey (outdoor clay)

Dates: 5–9 May

Participating teams

- Algeria
- Armenia
- Bosnia and Herzegovina
- Botswana
- Cyprus
- **Denmark**
- Egypt
- Estonia
- Ethiopia
- **Finland**
- **Georgia**
- Ireland
- Iceland
- Liechtenstein
- Lithuania
- **Luxembourg**
- Macedonia
- Malta
- Moldova
- Norway
- Tunisia
- Turkey
